= 2024–25 Boston University Terriers men's ice hockey season =

Friendship Four, Champion Beanpot, Champion NCAA Tournament, Runner-Up
- Conference: 3rd Hockey East
- Home ice: Agganis Arena

Rankings
- USCHO.com: #2
- USA Hockey: #2

Record
- Overall: 24–14–2
- Conference: 14–8–2
- Home: 11–6–0
- Road: 6–6–2
- Neutral: 7–2–0

Coaches and captains
- Head coach: Jay Pandolfo
- Assistant coaches: Joe Pereira; Kim Brandvold; Brian Daccord
- Captain(s): Ryan Greene; Shane Lachance
- Alternate captain: Devin Kaplan

The 2024–25 Boston University Terriers Men's ice hockey season was the 103rd season of play for the program and 41st in Hockey East. The Terriers represented Boston University in the 2024–25 NCAA Division I men's ice hockey season, played their home games at Agganis Arena and were coached by Jay Pandolfo in his 3rd season.

== Season ==
As Boston University's season began, the team was having to content with a sizable amount of turnover. Not only did the team lose roughly half of last season's roster but they were now without two major professional prospects (Macklin Celebrini and Lane Hutson). Coach Pandolfo was able to bring in a significant number of talented prospects with the Terriers adding six players already taken in the NHL draft and another (Sascha Boumedienne) who was projected as a 1st-round pick in the upcoming draft. In all, BU possessed talented lineups in college hockey with more than half of the team already attached to NHL teams, however, the squad was full of young underclassmen, many of whom had yet to learn the Terrier's system.

=== Goaltending woes ===
BU was hoping to rely on one of the few areas of experience available to the team with Mathieu Caron returning as the starting goaltender. Early result looked promising with the Terriers going 4–1 in October with their only loss coming against a ranked North Dakota team. Unfortunately, proved to be less kind to the scarlet and white. Caron had several poor performances, leading not only to the Terriers losing three consecutive games but also costing the senior his job in goal. BU gave Max Lacroix a chance in net but he inadequate to the role and the team swiftly returned the crease to Caron. The instability in goal resulted in the team losing five matches in a seven-game stretch while allowing nearly 5 goals per game. The offense, which was still a bit of a work in progress at the time, was able to put up decent numbers but nothing near what was required to lead the team to victory. However, the brief loss of the starting job did seem to shake Caron back into at least a respectable level of play. Once he got back in goal against Maine on the 16th, he was able to limit the opposition to around three goals per game until the winter break. The significant improvement allowed BU to win five of their last six games and finish off the first half of their schedule with a decent of damaged resume.

While goaltending was the team biggest issue, the Terriers' offense had swiftly come along and was back up to full strength by Christmas. Cole Eiserman, the 2024 1st-round selection, may have been the team's top goal scorer but Boston University continued to be lest by the Hutson family. Lane's two brothers Quinn and Cole led the charge and would finish the year as the Terriers' top two scorers. Ryan Greene and Shane Lachance (the latter of who was related to BU royalty in Scott Lachance and Jack Parker) finished out the top long alongside Quinn Hutson while the rest of the team provided a consistent level of depth scoring. BU averaged 3.75 goals per game for the year, good for 4th in the nation, but was hampered not only by subpar goaltending but also a porous defense. The Terriers surrendered more than 30 shots against per game, placing them in the bottom third of D1 teams. This meant that the team as a whole did very little to alleviate their already-struggling goalies.

=== From Russia with Love ===
Knowing that the team had the makings of a title contender, Jay Pandolfo decided to alter his plans midseason and bring in another goalie to try and improve the team's circumstances. Mikhail Yegorov, a goaltender who had already committed to BU the previous February, joined the team on January 15 and arrived on campus about a week later. Within four day of the announcement, Yegorov started his first collegiate game and the lanky netminder was thrown into the fire when he had to face down the nation's #1 team, Boston College. While the Terriers fell to their hated rivals, Yegorov acquitted himself well in his first action by holding the Eagles to just a single goal on 24 shots.

From that point on, the Terriers; season began to change. Yegorov was given complete control of the goal, starting every game for the remainder of the year. While he had some growing pains in February, the team gave him time to rise to round onto form with the college level. His first big task was leading the team into their annual matches at the Beanpot. While playing before an NHL-sized crowd, Yegorov was superb and backstopped the team to a pair of victories while allowing only one goal in each. The championship was particularly gratifying for the club as the Terriers were able to topple BC in the Final, preventing the Eagles from sweeping the season-series.

Down the stretch, both Yegorov and the team were looking stronger every day but they still had to battle against an inconsistent streak that never seemed to leave the Terriers. By the start of the postseason, BU's troubles had resulted in the team finishing with a respectable record, however, since Hockey East was the top-ranked conference this season, the team was already guaranteed an NCAA tournament berth.

=== Hockey East playoffs ===
By finishing third in the standings, BU received a bye into the quarterfinal round and was able to prepare itself for the final home game of the year. Massachusetts arrived the following weekend and got off to a decent start though it was Lachance who opened the scoring with a power play goal just 5 minutes into the game. The two teams exchanged markers in the second while UMass used the third to ramp up its offense and desperately try to find the tying goal. Yegorov was bombarded by 19 shots in the period and managed to stop all but one. Despite having been on the back foot for the second half of regulation, Eiserman made the most of his opportunity off the rush and ended the game less than 3 minutes into overtime.

The Terriers then met one of the nation's hottest teams in Connecticut in the semifinals. Quinn Hutson got BU an early lead, also on the power play, but after that the momentum swung completely in favor of the Huskies. UConn scored three goals in less than 8 minutes in the second, forcing the Terriers to try and score their way back into the game. While BU was fully capable of this, the team was forced to abandon any kind of defensive structure and all than did was give Connecticut the opportunity to score twice more in the third. A late goal by Boston University narrowed the score slightly but did noting to change the outcome and knocked BU out of the tournament.

=== NCAA tournament ===
While the Terriers had already assured themselves of a #2 seed, they ended up getting slotted in the Toledo Regional and were forced to travel several hundred miles for their first round match. They were set against Ohio State in what was supposed to be a fairly even match. The Buckeyes shot out of the gate and outshot BU 15–2 in the first period. Fortunately, Yegorov was able to limit the damage to just a single goal. After their embarrassing performance in the first 20 minutes, the Terriers woke up in the second and exchanged several goals with the Buckeyes until the score was tied at 3-all going into the third. While OSU had squandered their chances in the first, BU took full advantage of their in the third. Beginning with Aiden Celebrini's second of the year, the Terriers reeled off 5 goals in the third on only 8 shots. Every score seemed to sap more and more of the Buckeye's strength, particularly when Jack Hughes netted a short-handed tally. By the end of the game OSU was a shell of its former self, having been cored out by the superior talent on BU.

In the Regional Final, BU found itself facing one its oldest rivals in Cornell for a rematch of a 2023 Regional Final. Predictably, the Big Red relied heavily on their defense but the Ivy-leaguers had already demonstrated that they could score in their win over #2 Michigan State. The game went largely to form with both sides firing several shots on the opposing goaltenders, both of whom put up sterling performances. Cornell got a lead in the first but Matt Copponi responded swiftly to tie the game. Cole Hutson put his team up with a power play marker early in the third and BU was nearly able to ride their lead to the end of regulation but a perfectly-placed shot eluded Yegorov and ended up forcing the match into overtime. Both teams had opportunities to end the game but it was Quinn Hutson who became the hero. The junior fired a shot from the point through a maze of bodies that flew right into the net, sending the Terriers to their third consecutive Frozen Four.

==== Frozen Four ====
BU met Penn State for the first time in program history and was largely in control of the game from the start. While the Terriers had a sizable advantage in terms of control, the weren't able to get on the scoresheet until the second period. Fortunately, Yegorov was again up to the task and prevented any scoring through the first 40 minutes. The Terriers held a 2-goal lead entering the third and soon found themselves ahead by just a goal when Penn State finally broke through in the third minute. The Nittany Lions threw everything they had at the BU net and, though they were able to get a good number of chances on goal, Yegorov stopped any further scoring. The Terriers were able to ride their goaltender's efforts to the victory, especially after an empty net goal by Jack Harvey restored their 2-goal advantage.

==== National Championship ====
BU returned to the championship game for the first time in 10 years and only had Western Michigan standing in the way of their 6th title. On paper, the Terriers had the more talented team, however, Western had an even better offense that the Terriers (#1 in the nation) and had a much older and more experienced team. The Broncos were able to rely on their strengths and looked like the superior team for most of the game. WMU got off to a fast start, scoring the opening goal in the first 2 minutes of the match. Eiserman's 25th of the year tied the game but BU found itself trailing once more before the end of the period. After a third goal in the early part of the second increased Western's lead, Lachance was able to close the gap with a power play marker.

At the start of the third, BU still had every chance to win the title but the Western skaters were quick to show their dominance. BU had trouble matching the speed and physicality of the Broncos and it wasn't too long before they were down by a pair for the second time. Despite turning all their efforts towards the offensive side, BU was unable to break through and saw the last vestiges of hope dissipate when the Broncos collected a fifth goal with under 4 minutes to play. Now down by 3, the Terriers had no option but to pull Yegorov early. A subsequent empty-net goal ended the scoring for the night and forced both BU and their fans to wait for another year.

== Departures ==
Player	Position	Nationality	Cause
Macklin Celebrini	Forward	Canada	Signed professional contract (San Jose Sharks)
Ty Gallagher	Forward	United States	Transferred to Colorado College
Henry Graham	Goaltender	United States	Graduate transfer to Lindenwood
Nick Howard	Goaltender	United States	Graduation (retired)
Lane Hutson	Defenseman	United States	Signed professional contract (Montreal Canadiens)
Thomas Jarman	Defenseman	United States	Graduate transfer to Lindenwood
Case McCarthy	Defenseman	United States	Graduation (signed with Hartford Wolf Pack)
Dylan Peterson	Forward	United States	Graduation (signed with St. Louis Blues)
Sam Stevens	Forward	Canada	Graduation (signed with Toronto Marlies)
Luke Tuch	Forward	United States	Graduation (signed with Montreal Canadiens)
Cade Webber	Defenseman	United States	Graduation (signed with Toronto Maple Leafs)
Jeremy Wilmer	Forward	United States	Transferred to Quinnipiac
Nicholas Zabaneh	Forward	Canada	Graduation (signed with Providence Bruins)

== Recruiting ==
Player	Position	Nationality	Age	Notes
Kamil Bednarik	Forward	United States	18	Elk Grove Village, IL; selected 61st overall in 2024
Sascha Boumedienne	Defenseman	Sweden	17	Oulu, FIN
Matt Copponi	Forward	United States	21	Mansfield, MA; transfer from Merrimack; selected 216th overall in 2023
Cole Eiserman	Forward	United States	18	Newburyport, MA; selected 20th overall in 2024
Brehdan Engum	Defenseman	United States	24	Burnsville, MN; graduate transfer from Massachusetts Lowell
Billy Girard IV	Goaltender	United States	25	Boca Raton, FL; graduate transfer from University of New England
Cole Hutson	Defenseman	United States	18	North Barrington, IL; selected 43rd overall in 2024
Nick Roukounakis	Forward	United States	21	Pembroke, MA; selected 193rd overall in 2023
Brandon Svoboda	Forward	United States	19	Level Green, PA; selected 71st overall in 2023
Mikhail Yegorov	Goaltender	Russia	18	St. Petersburg, RUS; selected 49th overall in 2024; joined mid-season
Alexander Zetterberg	Forward	Sweden	18	Sundsvall, SWE

== Roster ==
As of September 4, 2024.

No.	Nat.	Player	Class	Pos	Height	Weight	DoB	Hometown	Previous team	NHL rights
1	(United States)	Billy Girard IV	Graduate	G	6' 1" (1.85 m)	201 lb (91 kg)	1999-01-27	Boca Raton, Florida	University of New England (NEHC)	—
2	(United States)	Gavin McCarthy	Sophomore	D	6' 1" (1.85 m)	185 lb (84 kg)	2005-06-02	Clarence Center, New York	Muskegon Lumberjacks (USHL)	BUF, 86th overall 2023
3	(United States)	Tristan Amonte	Senior	F	6' 0" (1.83 m)	177 lb (80 kg)	2000-02-01	Norwell, Massachusetts	Penticton Vees (BCHL)	—
4	(United States)	Jack Hughes	Senior	F	6' 0" (1.83 m)	165 lb (75 kg)	2003-11-02	Westwood, Massachusetts	Northeastern (HEA)	LAK, 51st overall 2022
5	(Sweden)	Tom Willander	Sophomore	D	6' 1" (1.85 m)	179 lb (81 kg)	2005-02-09	Stockholm, Sweden	Rögle BK (SHL)	VAN, 11th overall 2023
7	(United States)	Nick Roukounakis	Freshman	F	6' 2" (1.88 m)	225 lb (102 kg)	2003-09-08	Pembroke, Massachusetts	Tri-City Storm (USHL)	—
8	(United States)	Brandon Svoboda	Freshman	F	6' 3" (1.91 m)	207 lb (94 kg)	2005-02-04	Level Green, Pennsylvania	Fargo Force (USHL)	SJS, 71st overall 2023
9	(Canada)	Ryan Greene (C)	Junior	F	6' 1" (1.85 m)	180 lb (82 kg)	2003-10-21	Paradise, Newfoundland and Labrador	Green Bay Gamblers (USHL)	CHI, 57th overall 2022
10	(United States)	Brehdan Engum	Graduate	D	6' 2" (1.88 m)	215 lb (98 kg)	2000-08-10	Burnsville, Minnesota	Massachusetts Lowell (HEA)	—
11	(United States)	Kamil Bednarik	Freshman	F	6' 0" (1.83 m)	185 lb (84 kg)	2006-05-26	Elk Grove Village, Illinois	USNTDP (USHL)	NYI, 61st overall 2024
12	(United States)	Jack Harvey	Sophomore	F	5' 10" (1.78 m)	176 lb (80 kg)	2003-03-31	Stacy, Minnesota	Chicago Steel (USHL)	TBL, 193rd overall 2023
14	(United States)	Mick Frechette	Sophomore	D	6' 2" (1.88 m)	205 lb (93 kg)	2003-10-27	Weston, Massachusetts	Dexter Southfield (USHS–MA)	—
15	(United States)	Matt Copponi	Senior	F	5' 11" (1.8 m)	165 lb (75 kg)	2003-06-04	Mansfield, Massachusetts	Merrimack (HEA)	EDM, 216th overall 2023
17	(United States)	Quinn Hutson	Junior	F	5' 10" (1.78 m)	170 lb (77 kg)	2002-01-01	North Barrington, Illinois	Muskegon Lumberjacks (USHL)	—
18	(United States)	Shane Lachance (C)	Sophomore	F	6' 5" (1.96 m)	218 lb (99 kg)	2003-08-30	Andover, Massachusetts	Youngstown Phantoms (USHL)	EDM, 186th overall 2021
19	(United States)	Jack Page	Senior	D	6' 4" (1.93 m)	194 lb (88 kg)	2001-11-27	West Chester, Pennsylvania	New Jersey Rockets (NCDC)	—
21	(United States)	Devin Kaplan (A)	Junior	F	6' 3" (1.91 m)	204 lb (93 kg)	2004-01-10	Bridgewater, New Jersey	USNTDP (USHL)	PHI, 69th overall 2022
22	(Canada)	Aiden Celebrini	Sophomore	F	6' 1" (1.85 m)	195 lb (88 kg)	2004-10-26	Vancouver, British Columbia	Brooks Bandits (AJHL)	VAN, 171st overall 2023
23	(United States)	Doug Grimes	Sophomore	F	6' 3" (1.91 m)	205 lb (93 kg)	2002-04-18	Brookline, Massachusetts	Lincoln Stars (USHL)	—
26	(United States)	Jack Gorton	Sophomore	F	6' 3" (1.91 m)	200 lb (91 kg)	2002-02-13	Granite Springs, New York	Victoria Grizzlies (BCHL)	—
33	(United States)	Max Lacroix	Sophomore	G	6' 0" (1.83 m)	170 lb (77 kg)	2003-12-13	Castle Pines, Colorado	Colorado Grit (NAHL)	—
34	(United States)	Cole Eiserman	Freshman	F	6' 0" (1.83 m)	196 lb (89 kg)	2006-08-29	Newburyport, Massachusetts	USNTDP (USHL)	NYI, 20th overall 2024
40	(Russia)	Mikhail Yegorov	Freshman	G	6' 5" (1.96 m)	187 lb (85 kg)	2006-03-07	St. Petersburg, Russia	Omaha Lancers (USHL)	NJD, 49th overall 2024
44	(United States)	Cole Hutson	Freshman	D	5' 10" (1.78 m)	165 lb (75 kg)	2006-06-28	North Barrington, Illinois	USNTDP (USHL)	WSH, 43rd overall 2024
61	(Sweden)	Alex Zetterberg	Freshman	F	5' 8" (1.73 m)	163 lb (74 kg)	2006-04-27	Sundsvall, Sweden	Örebro HK J20 (J20 Nationell)	—
62	(Canada)	Mathieu Caron	Senior	G	6' 0" (1.83 m)	190 lb (86 kg)	2000-03-29	Abbotsford, British Columbia	Brown (ECAC)	—
71	(Sweden)	Sascha Boumedienne	Freshman	D	6' 2" (1.88 m)	183 lb (83 kg)	2007-01-17	Oulu, Finland	Youngstown Phantoms (USHL)	—

== Standings ==
2024–25 Hockey East Standings
	Conference record										Overall record					
	GP	W	L	T	OTW	OTL	SW	PTS	GF	GA	GP	W	L	T	GF	GA
#4 Boston College †	24	18	4	2	2	0	1	55	82	40	37	27	8	2	125	65
#8 Maine *	24	13	5	6	1	1	5	50	67	45	38	24	8	6	124	75
#2 Boston University	24	14	8	2	1	1	2	46	89	65	40	24	14	2	150	119
#7 Connecticut	24	12	8	4	3	2	1	40	76	65	39	23	12	4	130	97
#13 Providence	24	11	8	5	2	2	1	39	65	67	37	21	11	5	103	96
#10 Massachusetts	24	10	9	5	0	0	2	37	69	58	40	21	14	5	133	97
Massachusetts Lowell	24	8	13	3	0	1	2	30	57	69	36	16	16	4	93	101
Merrimack	24	9	14	1	1	0	1	28	57	81	35	13	21	1	81	112
Northeastern	24	7	14	3	1	1	2	26	48	71	37	14	20	3	88	112
New Hampshire	24	5	14	5	0	2	1	23	53	73	35	13	16	6	96	100
Vermont	24	6	16	2	2	3	1	22	59	88	35	11	21	3	100	116
Championship: March 21, 2025 † indicates regular season champion * indicates conference tournament champion (Lamoriello Trophy); Rankings: USCHO Division I Men's Poll

== Schedule and results ==
Date	Time	Opponent^{#}	Rank^{#}	Site	TV	Decision	Result	Attendance	Record
Regular Season
October 5	7:00 pm	Holy Cross*	#3	Agganis Arena • Boston, Massachusetts	ESPN+	Caron	W 5–2	6,150	1–0–0
October 12	7:00 pm	Union*	#3	Agganis Arena • Boston, Massachusetts	ESPN+	Caron	W 4–1	4,954	2–0–0
October 18	7:00 pm	Connecticut	#3	Agganis Arena • Boston, Massachusetts	ESPN+, NESN	Caron	W 4–1	5,074	3–0–0 (1–0–0)
October 19	7:00 pm	Harvard*	#3	Agganis Arena • Boston, Massachusetts (Exhibition)	ESPN+	Lacroix	T 2–2 ^{OT}	5,750	
October 25	8:07 pm	at #7 North Dakota*	#3	Ralph Engelstad Arena • Grand Forks, North Dakota	Midco	Caron	L 2–7	11,696	3–1–0
October 26	7:07 pm	at #7 North Dakota*	#3	Ralph Engelstad Arena • Grand Forks, North Dakota	Midco	Caron	W 4–3	11,736	4–1–0
November 1	7:00 pm	#11 Michigan*	#5	Agganis Arena • Boston, Massachusetts	ESPN+	Caron	L 1–5	6,010	4–2–0
November 2	7:00 pm	#11 Michigan*	#5	Agganis Arena • Boston, Massachusetts	ESPN+	Caron	L 4–5 ^{OT}	6,150	4–3–0
November 8	7:00 pm	#17 Massachusetts Lowell	#9	Agganis Arena • Boston, Massachusetts	ESPN+	Caron	L 3–5	4,799	4–4–0 (1–1–0)
November 9	6:05 pm	at #17 Massachusetts Lowell	#9	Tsongas Center • Lowell, Massachusetts	ESPN+	Lacroix	W 5–2	6,259	5–4–0 (2–1–0)
November 15	7:00 pm	at #7 Maine	#11	Alfond Arena • Orono, Maine (Rivalry)	ESPN+	Lacroix	L 2–5	4,807	5–5–0 (2–2–0)
November 16	7:00 pm	at #7 Maine	#11	Alfond Arena • Orono, Maine (Rivalry)	ESPN+	Caron	T 2–2 ^{SOW}	5,043	5–5–1 (2–2–1)
November 22	7:00 pm	Merrimack	#13	Agganis Arena • Boston, Massachusetts	ESPN+	Caron	W 6–3	4,468	6–5–1 (3–2–1)
Friendship Four
November 29	9:00 am	vs. Merrimack	#13	SSE Arena Belfast • Belfast, Northern Ireland (Friendship Four Semifinal)	NESN	Caron	W 6–2	9,000	7–5–1 (4–2–1)
November 30	2:00 pm	vs. Notre Dame*	#13	SSE Arena Belfast • Belfast, Northern Ireland (Friendship Four Championship)	NESN	Caron	W 4–3	9,000	8–5–1
December 7	6:00 pm	Massachusetts	#11	Agganis Arena • Boston, Massachusetts	ESPN+	Caron	L 0–4	5,072	8–6–1 (4–3–1)
December 11	7:00 pm	at Massachusetts	#13	Mullins Center • Amherst, Massachusetts	ESPN+, NESN, TSN+	Caron	W 4–2	4,649	9–6–1 (5–3–1)
December 13	7:00 pm	USNTDP*	#13	Agganis Arena • Boston, Massachusetts (Exhibition)	ESPN+	Girard	W 7–5	4,537	
December 29	4:00 pm	at Yale*	#13	Ingalls Rink • New Haven, Connecticut	ESPN+	Lacroix	L 5–7	2,960	9–7–1
January 10	7:00 pm	Vermont	#15	Agganis Arena • Boston, Massachusetts	ESPN+	Caron	W 6–1	4,499	10–7–1 (6–3–1)
January 11	5:00 pm	Vermont	#15	Agganis Arena • Boston, Massachusetts	ESPN+	Caron	W 7–4	4,170	11–7–1 (7–3–1)
January 17	7:00 pm	at #19 New Hampshire	#11	Whittemore Center • Durham, New Hampshire	ESPN+, NESN	Caron	W 6–3	5,653	12–7–1 (8–3–1)
January 18	6:00 pm	#19 New Hampshire	#11	Agganis Arena • Boston, Massachusetts	ESPN+	Caron	W 2–1 ^{OT}	5,717	13–7–1 (9–3–1)
January 24	7:00 pm	#1 Boston College	#8	Agganis Arena • Boston, Massachusetts (Rivalry)	ESPN+, NESN	Caron	L 2–6	6,150	13–8–1 (9–4–1)
January 25	7:00 pm	at #1 Boston College	#8	Conte Forum • Chestnut Hill, Massachusetts (Rivalry)	ESPN+, NESN	Yegorov	L 0–2	7,884	13–9–1 (9–5–1)
January 31	7:00 pm	#18 New Hampshire	#10	Agganis Arena • Boston, Massachusetts	ESPN+	Yegorov	W 7–2	4,483	14–9–1 (10–5–1)
Beanpot
February 3	5:00 pm	vs. Harvard*	#8	TD Garden • Boston, Massachusetts (Beanpot Semifinal)	NESN	Yegorov	W 7–1	—	15–9–1
February 7	7:00 pm	at Merrimack	#8	J. Thom Lawler Rink • North Andover, Massachusetts	ESPN+	Yegorov	L 1–2 ^{OT}	4,989	15–10–1 (10–6–1)
February 10	7:30 pm	vs. #1 Boston College*	#9	TD Garden • Boston, Massachusetts (Beanpot Championship, Rivalry)	NESN	Yegorov	W 4–1	18,258	16–10–1
February 14	7:00 pm	at #7 Providence	#9	Schneider Arena • Providence, Rhode Island	ESPN+	Yegorov	L 3–6	2,516	16–11–1 (10–7–1)
February 15	7:00 pm	#7 Providence	#9	Agganis Arena • Boston, Massachusetts	ESPN+	Yegorov	W 3–0	5,231	17–11–1 (11–7–1)
February 21	7:00 pm	Northeastern	#9	Agganis Arena • Boston, Massachusetts	ESPN+	Yegorov	L 1–5	5,727	17–12–1 (11–8–1)
February 22	7:00 pm	at Northeastern	#9	Matthews Arena • Boston, Massachusetts	ESPN+	Yegorov	W 3–1	4,687	18–12–1 (12–8–1)
February 25	7:00 pm	at #9 Connecticut	#10	Toscano Family Ice Forum • Storrs, Connecticut	ESPN+	Yegorov	T 2–2 ^{SOW}	2,691	18–12–2 (12–8–2)
March 6	7:00 pm	#6 Providence	#10	Agganis Arena • Boston, Massachusetts	ESPN+	Yegorov	W 8–2	4,826	19–12–2 (13–8–2)
March 8	7:00 pm	at Vermont	#10	Gutterson Fieldhouse • Burlington, Vermont	ESPN+	Yegorov	W 6–1	2,674	20–12–2 (14–8–2)
Hockey East Tournament
March 15	4:30 pm	#14 Massachusetts*	#9	Agganis Arena • Boston, Massachusetts (Hockey East Quarterfinal)	ESPN+	Yegorov	W 3–2 ^{OT}	5,563	21–12–2
March 20	4:00 pm	vs. #7 Connecticut*	#8	TD Garden • Boston, Massachusetts (Hockey East Semifinal)	ESPN+, NESN+	Yegorov	L 2–5	14,313	21–13–2
NCAA Tournament
March 27	2:00 pm	vs. #9 Ohio State*	#8	Huntington Center • Toledo, Ohio (Regional Semifinal)	ESPNU	Yegorov	W 8–3	6,907	22–13–2
March 29	4:00 pm	vs. #16 Cornell*	#8	Huntington Center • Toledo, Ohio (Regional Final; Rivalry)	ESPNU	Yegorov	W 3–2 ^{OT}	6,453	23–13–2
April 10	8:30 pm	vs. #12 Penn State*	#8	Enterprise Center • St. Louis, Missouri (National Semifinal)	ESPN2	Yegorov	W 3–1		24–13–2
April 12	7:30 pm	vs. #3 Western Michigan*	#8	Enterprise Center • St. Louis, Missouri (National Championship)	ESPN2	Yegorov	L 2–6	16,953	24–14–2
*Non-conference game. ^{#}Rankings from USCHO.com Poll. All times are in Eastern Time. Source:

== NCAA tournament ==
=== Regional semifinal ===
March 27, 2025; 2:00 pm	(2) Boston University	8–3 (0–1, 3–2, 5–0)	(3) Ohio State	Huntington Center; Attendance: 6,907

Game reference

Mikhail Yegorov
Goalies
Logan Terness
Referees:
Nick Krebsbach
Brandon Schmitt
Linesmen:
Eric Frank
Chris Williams

	0–1	09:06 – Joe Dunlap (7) (Hansen-Bukata, Ja. Dunlap)
(Kaplan, Bednarik) Cole Eiserman (22) – 28:07	1–1
	1–2	32:50 – PP – Joe Dunlap (8) (Rozzi, Hansen-Bukata)
(C. Hutson, Greene) Quinn Hutson (22) – PP – 37:19	2–2
	2–3	37:49 – Max Montes (14) (Weis, Able)
(Hughes, Harvey) Matt Copponi (5) – 38:01	3–3
(Copponi, Willander) Aiden Celebrini (5) – GW – 42:18	4–3
(Greene, C. Hutson) Jack Hughes (6) – SH – 45:25	5–3
(C. Hutson) Cole Eiserman (23) – 48:07	6–3
(Hughes, Boumedienne) Jack Harvey (10) – 54:16	7–3
(unassisted) Cole Hutson (13) – SH EN – 59:30	8–3

24 min
Penalties
4 min
23
Shots
36

Game summary
The game began slowly with both teams trying to feel one another out. A few one-and-done chances were obtained but the first five minutes was dominated by turnovers from both sides. The first real chance of the game came when Riley Thompson skated through the BU defense at 4:20 but Mikhail Yegorov made the save. Ohio State was able to establish some zone time afterwards but they were kept to the outside and unable to generate a scoring chance. The game returned to being a sleepy affair until the middle of the period. After setting up in the Terriers' end the puck came to Aiden Hansen-Bukata at the point. The Buckeye defenseman fired a soft shot on goal that Yegorov stopped with his pad but the puck bounced right to the stick of Joe Dunlap who had a wide-open cage and did not miss for the game's opening goal. Less than a minute later, Quinn Hutson was whistled for a slashing call to give OSU a chance to increase their lead. Yegorov was called upon to make several stops during the kill but it was Gavin McCarthy who made the biggest save when he rescued a puck from the goal line after it had leaked through the BU goaltender. Ohio State remained in control of the action for several minutes after their man-advantage thanks in part to their early dominance on faceoffs. After Yegorov made another key save from in tight, Cole Hutson took his turn in the penalty box with a hooking minor. Ohio State moved the puck well on the power play but missed on a few of their passes. Yegorov was forced to make a few saves in the back half of the man-advantage but BU was able to get control of the rebounds and clear the puck out of danger. OSU kept the Terriers on their heels until they committed an icing and allowed the Terriers to get some breathing room. BU was finally able to get its second shot of the game shortly afterwards but by the end of the period they found themselves trailing Ohio State 2–15 in that department. The only bright spot in the entire period for BU was that OSU was called for a penalty at the end and the Terriers would begin the second with their first power play of the match.

After a slow start, Boston University was able to finally get its first real scoring chance on the power play but Logan Terness was equal to the task. Ohio State's 50th-ranked penalty kill was able to stymie the Terriers and retain their lead. However, the momentum began to shift and BU was able to finally establish some offensive zone time afterwards to try and even out the play. After another giveaway by BU around the 5-minute mark, Yegorov had to make another big save in tight, this time on Patrick Guzzo. The Terriers began to show of their offensive talent in the middle of the period but the OSU defense was able to block several shots. Right after winning an offensive draw, Cole Eiserman rifled a shot into the top corner of the net to tie the game. BU began to take over after their goal until Gunnarwolfe Fontaine broke in on the Terrier goal just after the midway point of the game. Yegorov made the save and the match began to see-saw between the two clubs. Before anything could happen, however, Devin Kaplan smacked one of the OSU players in the head with his forearm and was given a roughing minor. The bad penalty ended up costing BU as Joe Dunlap scored his second of the game off of the rush. BU got right back on the attack after the penalty but the Ohio State defense limited the Terriers to long shots on goal that Terness was able to stop. With just over 3 minutes in the period, Jake Dunlap was called for hooking. After a pretty bit of passing, the nation's #5 power play connected when a wide-open Quinn Hutson wired the puck in off of the goal post. Riding high off of their second goal, BU Gave up a 2-on-1 and allowed the Buckeyes to take a lead when Max Montes fired low-stick on Yegorov. Just 12 seconds later, Matt Copponi received a pass from behind the cage and smacked the puck past Terness to even the count once more. With the two teams doing their best to wear out the goal horn, Shane Lachance took a very ill-advised interference penalty and was nearly given a second for arguing with the referees. About a minute in, Thompson nearly made the Terriers pay a second time but couldn't get the proper angle on a deflected puck and missed a wide-open net. Just as time was expiring, Joe Dunlap scored what he believed was his third of the game but time had expired moments before the puck entered the net and the game remained tied.

After BU was able to salt away the remainder of the penalty at the start of the third, Lachance got a good chance on goal but Terness was able to stop his relatively weak shot. A few minutes later, Terness failed to stop another weak shot from Aiden Celebrini then slipped under his right arm. With their first lead of the game, BU remained on the attack but OSU countered and the two started skating up and down the ice, trying to break through the opposing defenses. By this point, the Terriers had begun to take over on the faceoff dot but the Buckeyes used their structure to take control of the puck and generate another good scoring chance. While Yegorov made the save, the Terriers took their fifth minor of the game immediately afterwards to give Ohio State a golden opportunity to tie the match once more. A few seconds into the man-advantage, the puck bounced right to the BU defenders on the blueline and Jack Hughes carried the puck up the ice on a 2-on-1. The BU forward shot the puck and it was deflected past Terness by an OSU stick to double the lead. About a minute later, Cole Hutson was almost scored on a second 2-on-1 shorthanded chance. Shortly after the penalty expired, Eiserman smacked the puck backhanded from behind the goal line. The puck hit Terness as he was hugging the post but it found a hole and dropped into the goal. With the complexion of the game completely changed, OSU had to now abandon its defensive structure in the hope of finding three goals in the final 12 minutes. This however, only served to feed into the BU offense and allowed the Terriers to continue firing the puck on the Ohio State goal. Just past the 10-minute mark, Eiserman nearly completed a hat-trick when he shot at a half-empty cage but the puck hit the right post and bounced out the other side. Afterwards, the Buckeyes began to press but Yegorov remained strong in goal and kept the puck out of the net. On a counterattack, Jack Harvey made a move around a Buckeye defender and found himself wide open in front of the net. He flipped the puck into the top corner to give BU a 4-goal lead with under 6 minutes to play. The rest of the game was a bit loose as both teams seemed to understand that the game was essentially over. The Buckeyes were a bit physical in the waning moments but it was the Terriers who were called for a penalty when Celebrini was given a minor for interference with about 2 minutes left on the clock. Devin Kaplan then received a 2- and a 10-minute for yelling at the referees. With a 2-man advantage, Terness was pulled to give the Buckeyes a fleeting chance to tie. However, with less than a minute to play, Cole Hutson got control of the puck, danced through two OSU defenders and scored into the empty net to essentially end the game.

=== Regional final ===
March 29, 2025; 4:00 pm	(2) Boston University	3–2 (OT) (1–1, 0–0, 1–1, 1–0)	(4) Cornell	Huntington Center; Attendance: 6,453

Game reference

Mikhail Yegorov
Goalies
Ian Shane
Referees:
Eric Frank
Chris Williams
Linesmen:
Bruce Vida Jr.
Nick Huff

	0–1	07:35 – Ryan Walsh (17) (Bancroft, Rego)
(C. Hutson) Matt Copponi (6) – 08:47	1–1
(Greene, Q. Hutson) Cole Hutson (14) – PP – 40:34	2–1
	2–2	54:30 – Jack O'Leary (8) (Rego, Mack)
(Greene, Lachance) Quinn Hutson (23) – GW – 66:25	3–2

8 min
Penalties
9 min
43
Shots
39

Game summary
The match began fast with both teams playing to form. Boston University went on the attack while the Cornell defense held them back. Just two minutes into the game, Brandon Svoboda was called for tripping to give the Big Red the first power play of the game. Cornell was very deliberate on their man-advantage, moving the puck slowly. This allowed BU to hold their formation and kill off the penalty with relative ease. As soon as Svoboda left the box, BU went right back on the attack and was able to draw their own power play due to a tripping by Hank Kempf. The Terriers looked much more comfortable with their man-advantage, passing and skating with aplomb, but Cornell was equally at home defending and the Big Red were able to prevent any good scoring chances. Right after the penalty, Cornell, rushed up the ice on a 3-on-2 and Dalton Bancroft threw a shot on goal. Mikhail Yegorov easily stopped it with his blocker but the puck bounced out, hit Ryan Walsh and deflected into the net. The referee immediately waved off the goal for being directed in with a glove but Mike Schafer challenged the call. After the review the call was reversed as the puck had hit Walsh in the hip instead of the hand and Cornell was awarded the first goal of the game. Undeterred, BU got back on the attack and a minute later Cole Hutson carried the puck into the Cornell end. He ended up losing control but Matt Copponi was able to snag the loose puck and put it on goal. Ian Shane made the initial save but the rubber bounced back, and Kempf accidentally kicked it into his own net. After the two quick goals, the two teams began exchanging rushes with neither able to establish much offensive zone time. As the period progresses, Cornell began to tilt the ice towards Yegorov but the Terriers collapsed down to their goal and didn't give the Big Red any shots in tight. After a potential tripping call by BU was let go by the referees, the Terriers were called for their second penalty when Jack Hughes slashed Charlie Major's stick. Cornell was aided on their second power play by failed clears but Yegorov made a couple of key save to keep the score tied. After the penalty expired, Cornell continued to press in the BU end and got a few good looks on goal. The Terriers' defense pressured the Big Red, forcing them to move the puck but they were unable to cause a turnover. Yegorov was again forced to make a save and the two sides devolved into a bit of roughhousing afterwards. During the exchange, the refs decided to pause to make an official review of the play to see if there was a penalty for grabbing the face mask. After a lengthy break, Walsh was handed a 5-minute major to give one of the best power plays in the nation a glorious opportunity. The Terriers were able to produce a few great chances but Shane was equal to the task and the score remained tied. With just seconds left in the first period, Devin Kaplan took a slashing call on Cornell's clearing attempt and gave the Big Red a 2-minute reprieve for the start of the second.

With some extra space on the ice during 4-on-4 play, neither side looked particularly comfortable with mistakes being made at both ends of the ice. After two minutes of a relatively slow pace, Cornell was able to kill off the final minute of the major and then restart their forecheck. Though the Terriers turned the puck over in their own zone, their speed enabled them to thwart the Big Red's scoring attempts. Boston University was eventually to reply in kind and Hughes had a point-black shot from the slot but he fired the puck right into Shane's glove. Cornell continued to ramp up the pressure, stealing the puck from the Terriers every chance they could get and then counterattacking up the ice. BU managed to get back in time to stop several chances while Yegorov stopped what little leaked through. After the midpoint of the game, Cole Eiserman had a shot an a wide-open net but chipped the puck over the net. At the 5-minute mark, Jacob Kraft broke in on Yegorov and bumped into the netminder after he made a save. After the whistle, Kraft was shoved to the ice by Shane Lachance but no penalty was called. Both teams were getting chances on goal but the puck was spending most of its time in the BU end. This was due to Cornell being able to pounce on seemingly every loose puck in their own end and then clearing the zone before the Terriers could force a turnover. Near the end of the period, Cornell began to exhibit some offensive talent and a brilliant pass found Ondřej Pšenička in front of the net but Yegorov was able to make the save. BU countered and long pass up ice found Jack Harvey for a breakaway his five-hole attempt was stopped by Shane. Just as the period was winding down, Bancroft gave Harvey a tug with his free hand behind the net and was called for holding. As the period expired before Cornel could touch the puck, the entire power play would occur at the start of the third.

It took just over 30 seconds for Cole Hutson to fire the puck in off the far post through a razor-thin gap for a highlight-reel goal. The action was up and down for the next several minutes but neither defense surrendered much in the way of scoring chances. With around 14 to play, a failed clear by BU allowed Cornell to get the puck to the front of the net but the Terriers were able to clear before Cornell could fins the puck. On the counterattack, Lachance and Quinn Hutson were nearly able to slide the puck past a sprawling Shane bit the Cornell goalie was able to get a quick whistle. The play continued to see-saw up and down the ice but BU was able to play a little more defense than they had earlier and prevent Cornell from setting up in the offensive zone. Just after the middle of the period, the Big Red were finally able to establish themselves in the BU end and ended up drawing a tripping call from Copponi. The BU forward argued the call afterwards but was not handed a misconduct. BU attacked the Cornell players on the power play, forcing the Big Red to constantly move the puck. Though that resulted in several miscues by Cornell, they were still able to generate several chances but none found their mark. Just after the penalty expired, Jack O'Leary was able to get the puck in the high slot and he fired it against the grain, off the post for the tying goal. 30 seconds later, a bad turnover in the Cornell end led to a tremendous chance for Hughes but Shane made a magnificent leg save to keep his team in the game. With both teams searching for the winner, the game opened up in the final 4 minutes but both defenses remained on guard. BU was able to get into the Cornell end with a few minutes to play and Cole Hutson attempted to replicate his earlier goal on a nearly-identical play but the puck was kept out. Cornell then carried the play up the ice and was able to get an offensive zone draw off of an icing. With 13 seconds left, Cornell won a pair of draws and Major was able to get hard show on goal but Yegorov made the save and the two teams headed into overtime.

Boston University was first off the hop, getting a solid scoring chance in the first 15 seconds. After Shane made the save, Cornell rushed into the BU end and got a pair of looks at Yegorov before the defenses were able to calm things down. BU was able to get an offensive attack going but tight checking from Cornell kept them to the outside and allowed the Big Red to clear the puck. A miss by Eiserman from a sharp angle careened off the glass and allowed Cornell to get a chance after a long shift. After BU get back on the attack they were able to move the puck along the wall and keep it away from Cornell long enough for Quinn Hutson to fire a shot from the point that managed to find its way through a sea of bodies and end the game.

=== National semifinal ===
April 10, 2025; 7:30 pm	(T2) Boston University	3–1 (0–0, 2–0, 1–1)	(A4) Penn State	Enterprise Center; Attendance: 16,814

Game reference

Mikhail Yegorov
Goalies
Arsenii Sergeev
Referees:
Ryan Hersey
Nathan Wieler
Linesmen:
Tyler Liffrig
Erik Contino

(Copponi) Jack Hughes (7) – 21:35	1–0
(C. Hutson, Kaplan) Cole Eiserman – 30:44	2–0
	2–1	42:15 – Nicholas DeGraves (4) (Schoen, Mack)
(Willander, Hughes) Jack Harvey – EN – 59:01	3–1

4 min min
Penalties
6 min min
33
Shots
33

Game summary

=== National Championship ===
April 12, 2024; 6:30 pm	Western Michigan	6–2 (2–1, 1–1, 3–0)	Boston University	Enterprise Center; Attendance: 16,953

Game reference
Referees: Cameron Lynch; CJ Hanafin; Linesmen: John Rey; Patrick Dapuzzo

Scoring summary
Period	Team	Goal	Assist(s)	Time	Score
1st	WMU	Wyatt Schingoethe (5)	Hakkarainen, Washe	1:38	1–0 WMU
1st	BU	Cole Eiserman (25)	Kaplan, Bednarik	7:12	1–1
1st	WMU	Cole Crusberg-Roseen (3)		25:18	2–1 WMU
2nd	WMU	Ty Henricks (8) – GW	Knuble, Szydlowski	29:42	3–1 WMU
2nd	BU	Shane Lachance (12) – PP	Greene, C. Hutson	30:42	3–2 WMU
3rd	WMU	Owen Michaels (17)	Väisänen	47:16	4–2 WMU
3rd	WMU	Iiro Hakkarainen (13)	Schingoethe, Washe	50:02	5–2 WMU
3rd	WMU	Owen Michaels (18) – EN		57:52	6–2 WMU
Penalty summary
Period	Team	Player	Penalty	Time	PIM
1st	BU	Quinn Hutson	Hooking	9:33	2:00
2nd	WMU	Brian Kramer	Holding	30:26	2:00
2nd	WMU	Ty Henricks	Slashing	35:40	2:00
2nd	BU	Devin Kaplan	Kneeing	38:14	2:00

Shots by period
Team	1	2	3	T
Western Michigan	9	9	10	28
Boston University	8	8	10	26

Goaltenders
Team	Name	Saves	Goals against	Time on ice
WMU	Hampton Slukynsky	24	2	59:26
BU	Mikhail Yegorov	22	5	58:21

Game summary

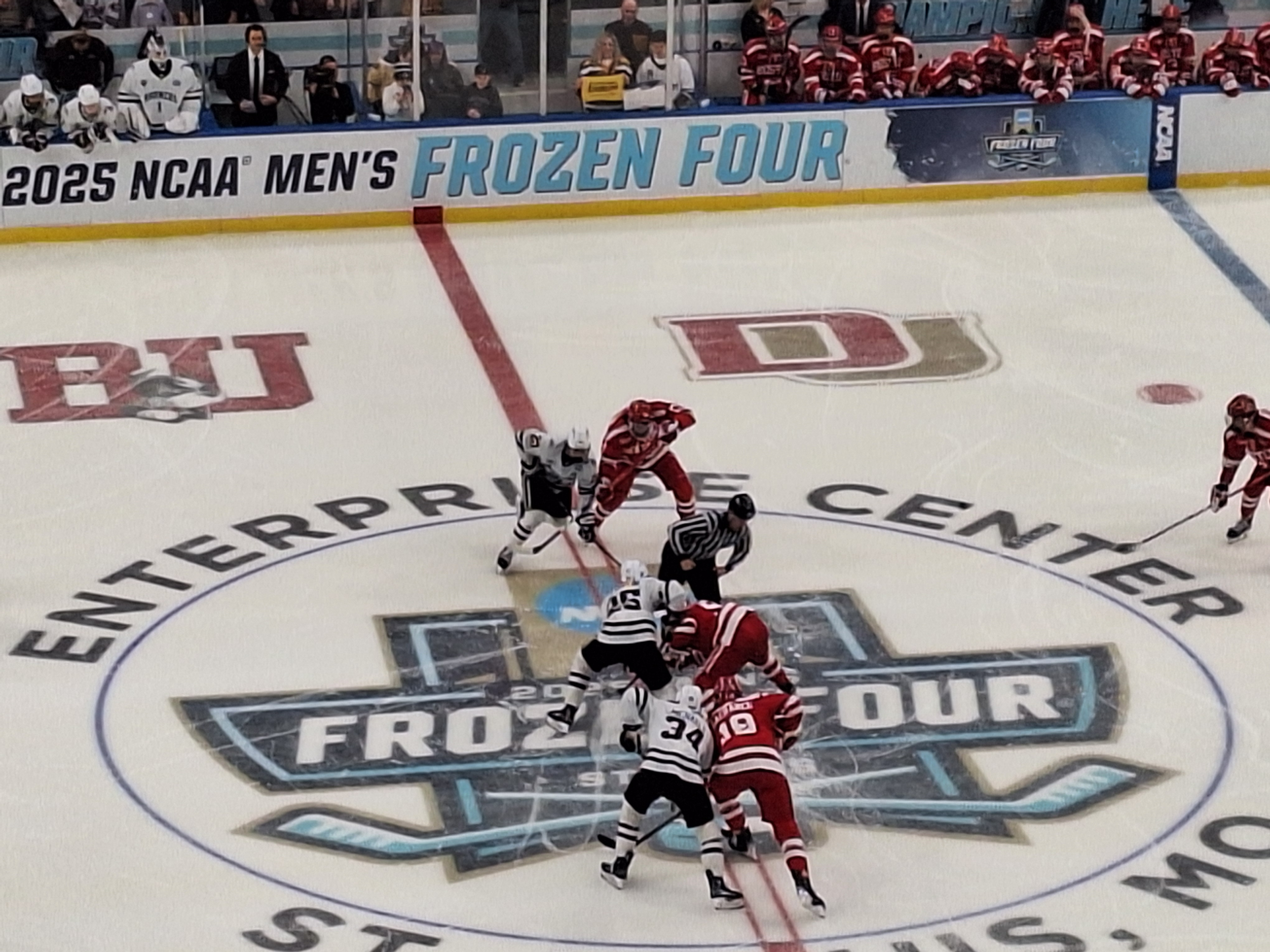
Opening face-off from the finals

== Scoring statistics ==
Name	Position	Games	Goals	Assists	Points	PIM
Quinn Hutson	RW	38	23	27	50	33
Cole Hutson	D	39	14	34	48	64
Ryan Greene	C	40	13	25	38	18
Cole Eiserman	LW	39	25	11	36	27
Shane Lachance	LW	40	12	18	30	28
Jack Harvey	F	40	11	16	27	2
Jack Hughes	C	40	7	18	25	22
Matt Copponi	C	40	6	18	24	14
Tom Willander	D	39	2	22	24	8
Kamil Bednarik	C	40	2	17	19	28
Devin Kaplan	RW	38	10	8	18	65
Gavin McCarthy	D	39	3	13	16	51
Sascha Boumedienne	D	40	3	10	13	33
Brandon Svoboda	C/RW	33	7	2	9	29
Alexander Zetterberg	C	26	5	3	8	2
Aiden Celebrini	D	31	2	6	8	14
Tristan Amonte	F	38	4	2	6	19
Nick Roukounakis	LW	21	0	5	5	12
Mathieu Caron	G	21	0	3	3	0
Jack Page	D	23	0	2	2	14
Brehdan Engum	D	30	0	2	2	8
Doug Grimes	RW	15	1	0	1	8
Mikhail Yegorov	G	18	0	1	1	0
Billy Girard	G	1	0	0	0	0
Jack Gorton	RW	3	0	0	0	0
Max Lacroix	G	4	0	0	0	0
Mick Frechette	D	25	0	0	0	8
Bench	–	–	–	–	–	14
Total			150	263	413	521

== Goaltending statistics ==
Name	Games	Minutes	Wins	Losses	Ties	Goals against	Saves	Shut outs	SV %	GAA
Mikhail Yegorov	18	1058:54	11	6	1	38	486	1	.927	2.15
Mathieu Caron	21	1139:28	12	6	1	60	532	0	.899	3.16
Max Lacroix	4	200:18	1	2	0	12	82	0	.872	3.59
Mathieu Caron	1	5:15	0	0	0	1	4	0	.800	11.43
Empty Net	-	20:02	-	-	-	8	-	-	-	-
Total	40	2423:57	24	14	2	119	1104	1	.903	2.95

== Rankings ==
Poll	Week																											
Poll	Pre	1	2	3	4	5	6	7	8	9	10	11	12	13	14	15	16	17	18	19	20	21	22	23	24	25	26	27 (Final)
USCHO.com	3	3	3	3	5	9	11	13	13	11	13	13	–	15	15	11	8	10	8	9	9	10	10	9	8	8	–	2
USA Hockey	3	3	3	3	5	9	13	16	13	11	12	13	–	14	13	11	9	10	8	9	8	8	9	7	7	8	3	2

Note: USCHO did not release a poll in week 12 or 26.
Note: USA Hockey did not release a poll in week 12.

== Awards and honors ==
Player	Award	Ref
Cole Hutson	Tim Taylor Award	
Cole Hutson	AHCA All-American East First Team	
Cole Hutson	Hockey East Rookie of the Year	
Cole Hutson	All-Hockey East First Team	
Tom Willander	All-Hockey East Second Team	
Quinn Hutson	All-Hockey East Second Team	
Ryan Greene	All-Hockey East Third Team	
Cole Hutson	Hockey East All-Rookie Team	
Cole Eiserman	Hockey East All-Rookie Team	
Cole Eiserman	NCAA All-Tournament team	

== 2025 NHL entry draft ==
Round	Pick	Player	NHL team
1	28	Sascha Boumedienne	Winnipeg Jets
2	33	Simon Wang ^{†}	San Jose Sharks
2	38	Carter Amico ^{†}	Philadelphia Flyers
2	40	Jack Murtagh ^{†}	Philadelphia Flyers
2	50	Conrad Fondrk ^{†}	New Jersey Devils
3	73	Charlton Trethewey ^{†}	Pittsburgh Penguins
3	76	Malte Vass ^{†}	Columbus Blue Jackets

† incoming freshman
