= 2024–25 Cornell Big Red men's ice hockey season =

ECAC Hockey Tournament, Champion NCAA Tournament, Regional Finals
- Conference: ECAC Hockey
- Home ice: Lynah Rink

Rankings
- USCHO: #12
- USA Hockey: #11

Record
- Overall: 19–11–6
- Conference: 10–8–4
- Home: 9–4–1
- Road: 6–6–4
- Neutral: 4–1–1

Coaches and captains
- Head coach: Mike Schafer
- Assistant coaches: Casey Jones; Sean Flanagan; Corey Leivermann
- Captain: Kyle Penney
- Alternate captain(s): Hank Kempf; Jack O'Leary; Tim Rego

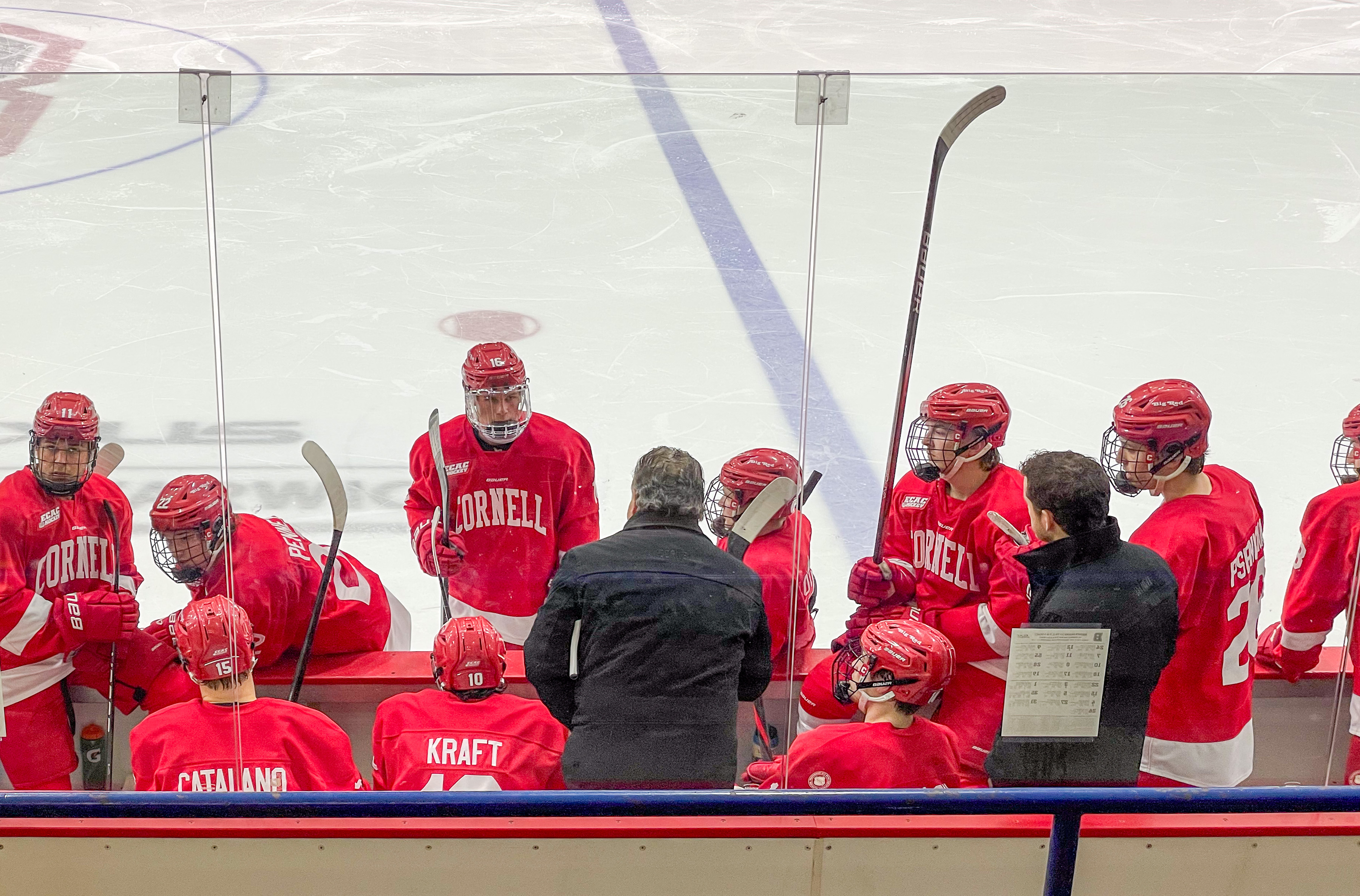
Coach Mike Schafer confers with players during his final season

The 2024–25 Cornell Big Red Men's ice hockey season was the 108th season of play for the program and 63rd in ECAC Hockey. The Big Red represented Cornell University in the 2024–25 NCAA Division I men's ice hockey season, played their home games at Lynah Rink and were coached by Mike Schafer in his 29th season.

== Season ==
During the offseason, head coach Mike Schafer announced that this would be his final season behind the bench. At the same time, Casey Jones (Cornell '90) was announced as Schafer's successor and he joined the staff as the associate head coach. Partly due to it being Schafer's final season, virtually the entire team returned from the previous year, providing Cornell with a wealth of chemistry and experience. The only losses the team suffered were the graduation of Gabriel Seger and the club's third-string goaltender. The entire defensive corps that had produced the nation's lowest goals against in 2024 and had the team within 1 goal of upsetting the eventual national champions was back and in a prime position to deliver once more. Replacing Seger, who was also the team's top scorer by quite a margin, would not be easy, however, the team hoped that the continued development of the remaining forwards, as well as the addition of two new faces, would make up for the difference.

=== Injuries ===
Cornell's season started with a bang as the Big Red swept #6 North Dakota and looked well matched against the Hawks despite their opponents having begun their season a month earlier. Cornell was able to accomplish this feat despite already being beset by injuries. George Fegaras was out and would miss the first three weeks of the campaign while Luke Devlin and Winter Wallace both had suffered season-ending injuries before even playing a game. Already missing three depth players, the injury bug took another bite out of the team when Ondřej Pšenička was felled in the second match against UND and would miss the next two weeks. After getting a decent result in the second weekend of the year, Cornell lost another two players when Sullivan Mack remained behind for their trip east, then lost Nick Wolfenberg during their game against Harvard. Even when the team managed to get players back into the lineup, the injuries kept coming and Kyle Penney was lost for nearly two months during their match with Princeton on November 23.

The constant reshuffling of the lineup led to several subpar performances by the Big Red. What was supposed to be a picturesque ride into the sunset for Schafer was quickly turning into a sloppy disaster. While the team was unable to find inconsistency simply because it couldn't ice the same group of players on consecutive nights, Ian Shane, the team's All-American goaltender, was batting through the worst stretch of his collegiate career. The senior, who had posted superb numbers in his first three years, was suddenly allowing soft goals at the worst moments. The Big Red struggled to cope with their injuries and limped into the winter break with a modest record.

=== Suspensions ===
With four weeks to recuperate, the team was hoping to field a relatively healthy squad in early January. They were able to get most of their players back the inconsistency remained. After a good result over Massachusetts, the offense sputtered against Arizona State and that trend continued for the rest of the regular season. It did not help that more players kept getting injured with Charlie Major, Sean Donaldson and Jonathan Castagna all missing chunks of time in the second half of the year. The increased playing time put a strain on the players who were not injured and both they and the team suffered as a result. During a particularly poor performance against Dartmouth, frustrations boiled over and several players got into a fight at the end of the game. Several people, including coach Schafer, were suspended and that led directly to a defeat at the hands of bottom-feeding St. Lawrence, perhaps Cornell's lowest point of the season.

The year went so poorly for Cornell that not only did they finish in the middle of the conference standings, far below where the preseason poll had them, but the team was completely out of the running for an at-large bid. The team was ranked 23rd in the PairWise rankings and, though that wasn't too far away from the bubble, the team had no path to reach the tournament without capturing the conference championship.

=== Conference tournament ===
Cornell began its postseason run in the First Round for the first time in a decade. For their final home game of the year, the Big Red took on Yale with a mostly in-tact lineup. With most of the players back up to game shape, the team looked far superior to their opponents and earned passage to the quarterfinal round. This was their second consecutive win and, unfortunately to that point, Cornell had only previously twice won consecutive game all season. With recent history going against them, the Big Red met their geographic rival Colgate and were finally able to string together a series of good games. Not only was the offense able to put up a decent number of goals but whatever problems that Shane had been facing appeared to be over. The netminder allowed just 1 goal in the two games and the team advanced to the semifinals in Lake Placid.

As the lowest-remaining seed, Cornell was set against regular season champion Quinnipiac. Castagna opened the scoring just before the end of the first period but Cornell was unable to build on that lead. Instead, the team proceeded to take four penalties in the second period and allow the Bobcats to even the count. Quinnipiac then took a lead with just over 5 minutes remaining in the third and put the team at DEFCON 1. With their season hanging in the balance, Cornell tried desperately to tie the game but, instead, Castagna got a bit over-exuberant and ended up taking the fifth minor of the match with just 1:50 left on the clock. On the ensuing faceoff, Cornell was able to gain control of the puck and somehow managed to get a 2-on-1 break. Mack was able to move the puck around the Bobcat defender and find Kyler Kovich in front of the net for a tap-in goal to tie the game. The stunned Bobcats were unable to convert on the power play and the game headed into overtime. In the later staged of the first overtime, Cornell was handed a golden opportunity when a Bobcat was sent to the box for slashing. About a minute into their advantage, a Dalton Bancroft pass found Tim Rego in the high slot and he one-timed the puck into the goal to continue the Big Red's season.

In the championship game, Cornell faced off against another team fighting to extend their year in Clarkson. The Big Red jumped on the Knights early, scoring two goals in the just over 7 minutes. The 2-goal edge allowed Cornell to bring its best weapon to bear, the defense. For the remainder of the match, Cornell held Clarkson at bay and kept the Golden Knights from getting too many chances on goal. Shane did allow one tally during the second period but that was the only blemish on the night. Ryan Walsh capped off the night with an empty-net goal and Cornell earned its way back to the NCAA tournament.

=== NCAA tournament ===
While Cornell's automatic bid gave the team entry into the national tournament, their ranking placed them second from the bottom. Cornell was forced to start their title chase against one of the championship favorites, Michigan State. Early on, the Big Red looked like they were completely outmatched as the Spartans outshot them 30–9 through the first two period. However, Cornell's experience helped to prevent the team from panicking and the Big Red were able to answer every goal that MSU scored. Michigan State's fast-paced attack appeared to lose steam in the third period and Cornell began to sure to the fore. With the Big Red applying pressure, Michigan State took its first penalty of the game with just 99 seconds left in regulation. With a very patient process, Cornell was able to move the puck around the outside and force MSU to open up their defense. After a few passes through the four-man box, they were able to get the Spartan goaltender out of position and Sullivan Mack rifled the puck into the goal. The score gave Cornell its first lead of the match with just 10 seconds to play. Michigan State was unable to mount a comeback attempt in the remaining time and the Big Red advanced to the Regional Finals after their upset victory.

The second round saw the team take on one of its oldest rivals in Boston University. Rather than sit back as they had in the Michigan State game, Cornell came out flying and weren't content to wait for their opportunities. Walsh opened the scoring with his team-leading 17th of the season but the Terriers swiftly evened the count. Both goaltenders were kept busy as the two teams nearly matched one another shot for shot throughout the entire game. Despite the high volume of chances, the score remained unchanged until the third when BU took the lead. Shane was forced to stand tall in goal and prevent the Terriers from increasing their lead while the Cornell offense tried to find the tying goal. With less than 6 minutes to play, Mack and Rego were able to force the puck through the BU defense until they found Jack O'Leary. The forward skated into the high slot and fired a hard shot back against the grain that rang off the pipe and into the cage. With the score tied, the two sides didn't relent with each probing for the winning goal. Cornell had its chances both at the end of the third and in overtime to end the game but they could not find the winning tally. Instead, the team's season was ended when a seeing-eye shot from the point found its way through a veritable forest of legs and ended the game.

While there was disappointment and a little anger at how the season ended, Cornell was able to overcome a slew of injures and give Mike Schafer a proper send-off, battling to the very end of his 30th season behind the bench.

== Departures ==
| Player | Position | Nationality | Cause |
|---|---|---|---|
| Ryan McInchak | Goaltender | United States | Graduation (retired) |
| Gabriel Seger | Forward | Sweden | Graduation (signed with Grand Rapids Griffins) |

== Recruiting ==
| Player | Position | Nationality | Age | Notes |
|---|---|---|---|---|
| Justin Katz | Goaltender | Canada | 19 | Mount Royal, QC |
| Charlie Major | Forward | United States | 20 | Skaneateles, NY |
| Parker Murray | Forward | United States | 21 | Manhattan Beach, CA |
| Nicholas Wolfenberg | Defenseman | Canada | 20 | Calgary, AB |

== Roster ==
As of August 2, 2024.

| No. | Nat. | Player | Class | Pos | Height | Weight | DoB | Hometown | Previous team | NHL rights |
|---|---|---|---|---|---|---|---|---|---|---|
| 2 | (England) | Liam Steele | Sophomore | D | 6' 4" (1.93 m) | 225 lb (102 kg) | 2004-04-21 | Cobham, England | Salmon Arm Silverbacks (BCHL) | — |
| 3 | (Canada) | Jack O'Brien | Junior | D | 6' 0" (1.83 m) | 170 lb (77 kg) | 2003-03-07 | White Rock, British Columbia | Nanaimo Clippers (BCHL) | — |
| 4 | (United States) | Hank Kempf (A) | Senior | D | 6' 2" (1.88 m) | 200 lb (91 kg) | 2002-04-15 | Wilmette, Illinois | Muskegon Lumberjacks (USHL) | NYR, 208th overall 2021 |
| 5 | (Canada) | Hoyt Stanley | Sophomore | D | 6' 3" (1.91 m) | 200 lb (91 kg) | 2005-02-04 | West Vancouver, British Columbia | Victoria (BCHL) | OTT, 108th overall 2023 |
| 6 | (Canada) | George Fegaras | Sophomore | D | 6' 2" (1.88 m) | 205 lb (93 kg) | 2004-04-26 | Richmond Hill, Ontario | Muskegon Lumberjacks (USHL) | DAL, 83rd overall 2022 |
| 7 | (United States) | Jimmy Rayhill | Senior | D | 5' 9" (1.75 m) | 175 lb (79 kg) | 2001-03-17 | New Hartford, New York | Odessa Jackalopes (NAHL) | — |
| 8 | (Canada) | Luke Devlin | Sophomore | F | 6' 3" (1.91 m) | 187 lb (85 kg) | 2004-03-12 | Toronto, Ontario | West Kelowna Warriors (BCHL) | PIT, 182nd overall 2022 |
| 9 | (United States) | Jack O'Leary (A) | Senior | F | 5' 7" (1.7 m) | 162 lb (73 kg) | 2000-03-28 | St. James, New York | Lincoln Stars (USHL) | — |
| 10 | (United States) | Jacob Kraft | Sophomore | F | 5' 8" (1.73 m) | 170 lb (77 kg) | 2003-04-26 | Churchville, New York | Cedar Rapids RoughRiders (USHL) | — |
| 11 | (Canada) | Sean Donaldson | Junior | F | 5' 11" (1.8 m) | 180 lb (82 kg) | 2001-03-28 | Vancouver, British Columbia | Nanaimo Clippers (BCHL) | — |
| 12 | (United States) | Tim Rego (A) | Senior | D | 6' 0" (1.83 m) | 172 lb (78 kg) | 2000-10-31 | Mansfield, Massachusetts | Brooks Bandits (AJHL) | — |
| 13 | (Slovakia) | Marián Moško | Sophomore | F | 5' 11" (1.8 m) | 185 lb (84 kg) | 2004-05-11 | Visolaje, Slovakia | Fargo Force (USHL) | — |
| 14 | (United States) | Ryan Walsh | Sophomore | F | 6' 1" (1.85 m) | 180 lb (82 kg) | 2003-08-25 | Rochester, New York | Cedar Rapids RoughRiders (USHL) | BOS, 188th overall 2023 |
| 15 | (United States) | Tyler Catalano | Sophomore | F | 6' 4" (1.93 m) | 225 lb (102 kg) | 2004-02-26 | St. Louis, Missouri | Youngstown Phantoms (USHL) | — |
| 16 | (United States) | Charlie Major | Freshman | F | 5' 10" (1.78 m) | 179 lb (81 kg) | 2004-09-14 | Skaneateles, New York | Chicago Steel (USHL) | — |
| 17 | (Canada) | Dalton Bancroft | Junior | F | 6' 3" (1.91 m) | 200 lb (91 kg) | 2001-02-26 | Madoc, Ontario | Trenton Golden Hawks (OJHL) | — |
| 18 | (Canada) | Kyler Kovich | Senior | F | 6' 2" (1.88 m) | 182 lb (83 kg) | 2002-01-31 | Coquitlam, British Columbia | Tri-City Storm (USHL) | — |
| 19 | (United States) | Sullivan Mack | Senior | F | 6' 1" (1.85 m) | 189 lb (86 kg) | 2000-07-05 | Anchorage, Alaska | Salmon Arm Silverbacks (BCHL) | — |
| 21 | (United States) | Ben Robertson | Sophomore | D | 5' 11" (1.8 m) | 181 lb (82 kg) | 2004-09-18 | Potomac Falls, Virginia | Waterloo Black Hawks (USHL) | — |
| 22 | (Canada) | Kyle Penney (C) | Senior | F | 6' 1" (1.85 m) | 204 lb (93 kg) | 2000-07-18 | Lawrencetown, Nova Scotia | Chilliwack (BCHL) | — |
| 23 | (United States) | Winter Wallace | Junior | F | 6' 3" (1.91 m) | 215 lb (98 kg) | 2002-01-21 | Boulder, Colorado | Youngstown Phantoms (USHL) | — |
| 24 | (Canada) | Nicholas Wolfenberg | Freshman | D | 6' 2" (1.88 m) | 201 lb (91 kg) | 2004-06-11 | Calgary, Alberta | Okotoks Oilers (BCHL) | — |
| 26 | (Czech Republic) | Ondřej Pšenička | Senior | F | 6' 6" (1.98 m) | 211 lb (96 kg) | 2001-01-07 | Prague, Czech Republic | Waterloo Black Hawks (USHL) | — |
| 27 | (United States) | Michael Suda | Senior | D | 6' 1" (1.85 m) | 180 lb (82 kg) | 2002-07-03 | Cheektowaga, New York | Fargo Force (USHL) | — |
| 28 | (United States) | Nick DeSantis | Junior | F | 5' 9" (1.75 m) | 155 lb (70 kg) | 2002-05-02 | Collegeville, Pennsylvania | Madison Capitols (USHL) | — |
| 29 | (United States) | Parker Murray | Freshman | F | 6' 4" (1.93 m) | 225 lb (102 kg) | 2003-09-26 | Manhattan Beach, California | Chilliwack Chiefs (BCHL) | — |
| 30 | (United States) | Ian Shane | Senior | G | 6' 0" (1.83 m) | 170 lb (77 kg) | 2000-09-24 | Manhattan Beach, California | Bismarck Bobcats (USHL) | — |
| 33 | (United States) | Remington Keopple | Junior | G | 6' 2" (1.88 m) | 190 lb (86 kg) | 2002-03-21 | New Richmond, Wisconsin | Des Moines Buccaneers (USHL) | — |
| 37 | (Canada) | Justin Katz | Freshman | G | 6' 2" (1.88 m) | 183 lb (83 kg) | 2004-10-28 | Mont-Royal, Quebec | Powell River Kings (BCHL) | — |
| 38 | (Canada) | Jonathan Castagna | Sophomore | F | 6' 2" (1.88 m) | 185 lb (84 kg) | 2005-04-20 | Etobicoke, Ontario | St. Andrew's College (CISAA) | UTA, 70th overall 2023 |

== Standings ==
2024–25 ECAC Hockey Standings
| | Conference record | | | | | | | | | | Overall record | | | | | |
| | GP | W | L | T | OTW | OTL | SW | PTS | GF | GA | GP | W | L | T | GF | GA |
|---|---|---|---|---|---|---|---|---|---|---|---|---|---|---|---|---|
| #15 Quinnipiac † | 22 | 16 | 5 | 1 | 2 | 3 | 0 | 50 | 79 | 42 | 38 | 24 | 12 | 2 | 135 | 83 |
| #20 Clarkson | 22 | 15 | 6 | 1 | 2 | 1 | 0 | 45 | 74 | 47 | 39 | 24 | 12 | 3 | 121 | 87 |
| Colgate | 22 | 13 | 7 | 2 | 2 | 2 | 1 | 42 | 80 | 65 | 36 | 18 | 15 | 3 | 114 | 116 |
| Union | 22 | 12 | 8 | 2 | 0 | 0 | 2 | 40 | 67 | 61 | 36 | 19 | 14 | 3 | 112 | 109 |
| Dartmouth | 22 | 12 | 9 | 1 | 0 | 2 | 0 | 39 | 70 | 52 | 33 | 18 | 13 | 2 | 110 | 84 |
| #12 Cornell * | 22 | 10 | 8 | 4 | 1 | 0 | 3 | 36 | 69 | 53 | 36 | 19 | 11 | 6 | 112 | 82 |
| Harvard | 22 | 9 | 10 | 3 | 2 | 2 | 1 | 31 | 56 | 56 | 33 | 13 | 17 | 3 | 85 | 97 |
| Brown | 22 | 9 | 11 | 2 | 3 | 0 | 2 | 28 | 53 | 63 | 32 | 14 | 15 | 3 | 79 | 85 |
| Princeton | 22 | 7 | 12 | 3 | 2 | 2 | 1 | 25 | 55 | 73 | 30 | 12 | 15 | 3 | 71 | 86 |
| Rensselaer | 22 | 7 | 15 | 0 | 0 | 2 | 0 | 23 | 57 | 82 | 35 | 12 | 21 | 2 | 101 | 131 |
| Yale | 22 | 5 | 14 | 3 | 1 | 1 | 1 | 19 | 52 | 80 | 30 | 6 | 21 | 3 | 67 | 121 |
| St. Lawrence | 22 | 5 | 15 | 2 | 1 | 1 | 1 | 18 | 43 | 81 | 35 | 9 | 24 | 2 | 71 | 121 |
Championship: March 22, 2025 † indicates conference regular season champion (Cleary Cup) * indicates conference tournament champion (Whitelaw Cup); Rankings: USCHO.com Top 20 Poll

== Schedule and results ==
| Date | Time | Opponent^{#} | Rank^{#} | Site | TV | Decision | Result | Attendance | Record |
Exhibition
| October 26 | 7:00 pm | Toronto* | #8 | Lynah Rink • Ithaca, New York (Exhibition) | ESPN+ | Shane | W 6–2 | 4,267 | |
Regular Season
| November 1 | 7:00 pm | #6 North Dakota* | #9 | Lynah Rink • Ithaca, New York | ESPN+ | Shane | W 4–1 | 4,267 | 1–0–0 |
| November 2 | 7:00 pm | #6 North Dakota* | #9 | Lynah Rink • Ithaca, New York | ESPN+ | Shane | W 5–3 | 4,091 | 2–0–0 |
| November 8 | 7:00 pm | Yale | #6 | Lynah Rink • Ithaca, New York | ESPN+ | Shane | T 2–2 ^{SOL} | 4,267 | 2–0–1 (0–0–1) |
| November 9 | 7:00 pm | Brown | #6 | Lynah Rink • Ithaca, New York | ESPN+ | Shane | W 3–1 | 4,267 | 3–0–1 (1–0–1) |
| November 15 | 7:00 pm | at #17 Dartmouth | #6 | Thompson Arena • Hanover, New Hampshire | ESPN+ | Shane | L 3–4 | 2,801 | 3–1–1 (1–1–1) |
| November 16 | 7:00 pm | at #20 Harvard | #6 | Bright-Landry Hockey Center • Boston, Massachusetts (Rivalry) | ESPN+ | Shane | T 2–2 ^{SOW} | 2,917 | 3–1–2 (1–1–2) |
| November 22 | 7:00 pm | #18 Quinnipiac | #8 | Lynah Rink • Ithaca, New York | ESPN+ | Shane | L 1–3 | 3,980 | 3–2–2 (1–2–2) |
| November 23 | 7:00 pm | Princeton | #8 | Lynah Rink • Ithaca, New York | ESPN+ | Shane | W 5–0 | 4,267 | 4–2–2 (2–2–2) |
| November 30 | 8:00 pm | vs. #18 Quinnipiac* | #11 | Madison Square Garden • New York, New York (The Frozen Apple) | ESPN+ | Shane | T 3–3 ^{OT} | 16,593 | 4–2–3 |
| December 6 | 7:00 pm | Colgate | #12 | Lynah Rink • Ithaca, New York | ESPN+ | Shane | W 3–2 ^{OT} | 4,267 | 5–2–3 (3–2–2) |
| December 7 | 7:00 pm | at Colgate | #12 | Class of 1965 Arena • Hamilton, New York | ESPN+ | Shane | L 3–6 | 2,222 | 5–3–3 (3–3–2) |
Desert Hockey Classic
| January 3 | 5:00 pm | vs. Massachusetts* | #16 | Mullett Arena • Tempe, Arizona (Desert Hockey Classic Semifinal) | | Shane | W 4–2 | 1,832 | 6–3–3 |
| January 4 | 9:00 pm | at #19 Arizona State* | #16 | Mullett Arena • Tempe, Arizona (Desert Hockey Classic Championship) | | Shane | L 0–4 | 4,340 | 6–4–3 |
| January 10 | 7:00 pm | at Sacred Heart* | #18 | Martire Family Arena • Fairfield, Connecticut | FloHockey | Shane | T 1–1 ^{OT} | 2,930 | 6–4–4 |
| January 11 | 5:00 pm | at Sacred Heart* | #18 | Martire Family Arena • Fairfield, Connecticut | FloHockey | Shane | L 2–4 | 3,266 | 6–5–4 |
| January 17 | 7:00 pm | at Princeton | | Hobey Baker Memorial Rink • Princeton, New Jersey | ESPN+, SNY | Keopple | W 6–2 | 2,432 | 7–5–4 (4–3–2) |
| January 18 | 7:00 pm | at #16 Quinnipiac | | M&T Bank Arena • Hamden, Connecticut | ESPN+ | Shane | T 2–2 ^{SOW} | 3,019 | 7–5–5 (4–3–3) |
| January 24 | 7:00 pm | Harvard | | Lynah Rink • Ithaca, New York (Rivalry) | ESPN+ | Shane | W 4–1 | 4,267 | 8–5–5 (5–3–3) |
| January 25 | 7:00 pm | Dartmouth | | Lynah Rink • Ithaca, New York | ESPN+ | Shane | L 1–6 | 4,267 | 8–6–5 (5–4–3) |
| January 31 | 7:00 pm | at St. Lawrence | | Appleton Arena • Canton, New York | ESPN+ | Shane | L 1–2 | 1,326 | 8–7–5 (5–5–3) |
| February 1 | 7:00 pm | at Clarkson | | Cheel Arena • Potsdam, New York | ESPN+ | Shane | T 3–3 ^{SOW} | 2,891 | 8–7–6 (5–5–4) |
| February 7 | 7:00 pm | Rensselaer | | Lynah Rink • Ithaca, New York | ESPN+ | Shane | W 4–2 | 3,981 | 9–7–6 (6–5–4) |
| February 8 | 7:00 pm | Union | | Lynah Rink • Ithaca, New York | ESPN+ | Shane | L 1–4 | 3,893 | 9–8–6 (6–6–4) |
| February 14 | 7:00 pm | at Brown | | Meehan Auditorium • Providence, Rhode Island | ESPN+ | Shane | W 6–1 | 1,375 | 10–8–6 (7–6–4) |
| February 15 | 7:00 pm | at Yale | | Ingalls Rink • New Haven, Connecticut | ESPN+ | Shane | W 5–3 | 2,697 | 11–8–6 (8–6–4) |
| February 21 | 7:00 pm | #19 Clarkson | | Lynah Rink • Ithaca, New York | ESPN+ | Shane | L 1–3 | 4,267 | 11–9–6 (8–7–4) |
| February 22 | 7:00 pm | St. Lawrence | | Lynah Rink • Ithaca, New York | ESPN+ | Shane | W 6–0 | 4,267 | 12–9–6 (9–7–4) |
| February 28 | 7:00 pm | at Union | | Achilles Rink • Schenectady, New York | ESPN+ | Shane | L 1–4 | 2,112 | 12–10–6 (9–8–4) |
| March 1 | 7:00 pm | at Rensselaer | | Houston Field House • Troy, New York | ESPN+ | Keopple | W 6–0 | 2,232 | 13–10–6 (10–8–4) |
ECAC Hockey Tournament
| March 8 | 7:30 pm | Yale* | | Lynah Rink • Ithaca, New York (ECAC First Round) | ESPN+ | Shane | W 5–1 | 4,121 | 14–10–6 |
| March 14 | 7:00 pm | at Colgate* | | Class of 1965 Arena • Hamilton, New York (ECAC Quarterfinal Game 1) | ESPN+ | Shane | W 4–1 | 1,100 | 15–10–6 |
| March 15 | 7:00 pm | at Colgate* | | Class of 1965 Arena • Hamilton, New York (ECAC Quarterfinal Game 2) | ESPN+ | Shane | W 3–0 | 1,029 | 16–10–6 |
| March 21 | 4:00 pm | vs. #12 Quinnipiac* | | Herb Brooks Arena • Lake Placid, New York (ECAC Semifinal) | ESPN+ | Shane | W 3–2 ^{OT} | 5,320 | 17–10–6 |
| March 22 | 5:00 pm | vs. #18 Clarkson* | | Herb Brooks Arena • Lake Placid, New York (ECAC Championship) | ESPN+ | Shane | W 3–1 | 5,965 | 18–10–6 |
NCAA Tournament
| March 27 | 5:30 pm | vs. #1 Michigan State* | #16 | Huntington Center • Toledo, Ohio (Regional Semifinal) | ESPN+ | Shane | W 4–3 | 6,937 | 19–10–6 |
| March 29 | 4:00 pm | vs. #8 Boston University* | #16 | Huntington Center • Toledo, Ohio (Regional Final; Rivalry) | ESPNU | Shane | L 2–3 ^{OT} | 6,453 | 19–11–6 |
*Non-conference game. ^{#}Rankings from USCHO.com Poll. All times are in Eastern Time. Source:

== NCAA tournament ==
=== Regional semifinal ===
| March 27, 2025; 5:30 pm | (1) Michigan State | 3–4 (2–1, 1–1, 0–2) | (4) Cornell | Huntington Center; Attendance: 6,937 |

Game reference

Trey Augustine
Goalies
Ian Shane
Referees:
Geoff Miller
Terrance Murphy
Linesmen:
Bill Kingdon
Jeff McCorkle

| (Larson, Dorwart) Gavin O'Connell (6) – 07:20 | 1–0 |
| | 1–1 | 15:02 – Ryan Walsh (15) (Robertson, Mack) |
| (Stramel, Howard) Daniel Russell (13) – PP – 19:31 | 2–1 |
| | 2–2 | 36:30 – Charlie Major (4) (Stanley) |
| (Štrbák, O'Connell) Karsen Dorwart (13) – 36:47 | 3–2 |
| | 3–3 | 52:38 – Ryan Walsh (16) (Robertson) |
| | 3–4 | 59:50 – GW PP – Sullivan Mack (17) (Major, Fegaras) |

2 min
Penalties
2 min
37
Shots
21

Game summary

=== Regional final ===
| March 29, 2025; 4:00 pm | (2) Boston University | 3–2 (OT) (1–1, 0–0, 1–1, 1–0) | (4) Cornell | Huntington Center; Attendance: 6,453 |

Game reference

Mikhail Yegorov
Goalies
Ian Shane
Referees:
Eric Frank
Chris Williams
Linesmen:
Bruce Vida Jr.
Nick Huff

| | 0–1 | 07:35 – Ryan Walsh (17) (Bancroft, Rego) |
| (C. Hutson) Matt Copponi (6) – 08:47 | 1–1 |
| (Greene, Q. Hutson) Cole Hutson (14) – PP – 40:34 | 2–1 |
| | 2–2 | 54:30 – Jack O'Leary (8) (Rego, Mack) |
| (Greene, Lachance) Quinn Hutson (23) – GW – 66:25 | 3–2 |

8 min
Penalties
9 min
43
Shots
39

Game summary
The match began fast with both teams playing to form. Boston University went on the attack while the Cornell defense held them back. Just two minutes into the game, Brandon Svoboda was called for tripping to give the Big Red the first power play of the game. Cornell was very deliberate on their man-advantage, moving the puck slowly. This allowed BU to hold their formation and kill off the penalty with relative ease. As soon as Svoboda left the box, BU went right back on the attack and was able to draw their own power play due to a tripping by Hank Kempf. The Terriers looked much more comfortable with their man-advantage, passing and skating with aplomb, but Cornell was equally at home defending and the Big Red were able to prevent any good scoring chances. Right after the penalty, Cornell, rushed up the ice on a 3-on-2 and Dalton Bancroft threw a shot on goal. Mikhail Yegorov easily stopped it with his blocker but the puck bounced out, hit Ryan Walsh and deflected into the net. The referee immediately waved off the goal for being directed in with a glove but Mike Schafer challenged the call. After the review the call was reversed as the puck had hit Walsh in the hip instead of the hand and Cornell was awarded the first goal of the game. Undeterred, BU got back on the attack and a minute later Cole Hutson carried the puck into the Cornell end. He ended up losing control but Matt Copponi was able to snag the loose puck and put it on goal. Ian Shane made the initial save but the rubber bounced back, and Kempf accidentally kicked it into his own net. After the two quick goals, the two teams began exchanging rushes with neither able to establish much offensive zone time. As the period progresses, Cornell began to tilt the ice towards Yegorov but the Terriers collapsed down to their goal and didn't give the Big Red any shots in tight. After a potential tripping call by BU was let go by the referees, the Terriers were called for their second penalty when Jack Hughes slashed Charlie Major's stick. Cornell was aided on their second power play by failed clears but Yegorov made a couple of key save to keep the score tied. After the penalty expired, Cornell continued to press in the BU end and got a few good looks on goal. The Terriers' defense pressured the Big Red, forcing them to move the puck but they were unable to cause a turnover. Yegorov was again forced to make a save and the two sides devolved into a bit of roughhousing afterwards. During the exchange, the refs decided to pause to make an official review of the play to see if there was a penalty for grabbing the face mask. After a lengthy break, Walsh was handed a 5-minute major to give one of the best power plays in the nation a glorious opportunity. The Terriers were able to produce a few great chances but Shane was equal to the task and the score remained tied. With just seconds left in the first period, Devin Kaplan took a slashing call on Cornell's clearing attempt and gave the Big Red a 2-minute reprieve for the start of the second.

With some extra space on the ice during 4-on-4 play, neither side looked particularly comfortable with mistakes being made at both ends of the ice. After two minutes of a relatively slow pace, Cornell was able to kill off the final minute of the major and then restart their forecheck. Though the Terriers turned the puck over in their own zone, their speed enabled them to thwart the Big Red's scoring attempts. Boston University was eventually to reply in kind and Hughes had a point-black shot from the slot but he fired the puck right into Shane's glove. Cornell continued to ramp up the pressure, stealing the puck from the Terriers every chance they could get and then counterattacking up the ice. BU managed to get back in time to stop several chances while Yegorov stopped what little leaked through. After the midpoint of the game, Cole Eiserman had a shot an a wide-open net but chipped the puck over the net. At the 5-minute mark, Jacob Kraft broke in on Yegorov and bumped into the netminder after he made a save. After the whistle, Kraft was shoved to the ice by Shane Lachance but no penalty was called. Both teams were getting chances on goal but the puck was spending most of its time in the BU end. This was due to Cornell being able to pounce on seemingly every loose puck in their own end and then clearing the zone before the Terriers could force a turnover. Near the end of the period, Cornell began to exhibit some offensive talent and a brilliant pass found Ondřej Pšenička in front of the net but Yegorov was able to make the save. BU countered and long pass up ice found Jack Harvey for a breakaway his five-hole attempt was stopped by Shane. Just as the period was winding down, Bancroft gave Harvey a tug with his free hand behind the net and was called for holding. As the period expired before Cornel could touch the puck, the entire power play would occur at the start of the third.

It took just over 30 seconds for Cole Hutson to fire the puck in off the far post through a razor-thin gap for a highlight-reel goal. The action was up and down for the next several minutes but neither defense surrendered much in the way of scoring chances. With around 14 to play, a failed clear by BU allowed Cornell to get the puck to the front of the net but the Terriers were able to clear before Cornell could fins the puck. On the counterattack, Lachance and Quinn Hutson were nearly able to slide the puck past a sprawling Shane bit the Cornell goalie was able to get a quick whistle. The play continued to see-saw up and down the ice but BU was able to play a little more defense than they had earlier and prevent Cornell from setting up in the offensive zone. Just after the middle of the period, the Big Red were finally able to establish themselves in the BU end and ended up drawing a tripping call from Copponi. The BU forward argued the call afterwards but was not handed a misconduct. BU attacked the Cornell players on the power play, forcing the Big Red to constantly move the puck. Though that resulted in several miscues by Cornell, they were still able to generate several chances but none found their mark. Just after the penalty expired, Jack O'Leary was able to get the puck in the high slot and he fired it against the grain, off the post for the tying goal. 30 seconds later, a bad turnover in the Cornell end led to a tremendous chance for Hughes but Shane made a magnificent leg save to keep his team in the game. With both teams searching for the winner, the game opened up in the final 4 minutes but both defenses remained on guard. BU was able to get into the Cornell end with a few minutes to play and Cole Hutson attempted to replicate his earlier goal on a nearly-identical play but the puck was kept out. Cornell then carried the play up the ice and was able to get an offensive zone draw off of an icing. With 13 seconds left, Cornell won a pair of draws and Major was able to get hard show on goal but Yegorov made the save and the two teams headed into overtime.

Boston University was first off the hop, getting a solid scoring chance in the first 15 seconds. After Shane made the save, Cornell rushed into the BU end and got a pair of looks at Yegorov before the defenses were able to calm things down. BU was able to get an offensive attack going but tight checking from Cornell kept them to the outside and allowed the Big Red to clear the puck. A miss by Eiserman from a sharp angle careened off the glass and allowed Cornell to get a chance after a long shift. After BU get back on the attack they were able to move the puck along the wall and keep it away from Cornell long enough for Quinn Hutson to fire a shot from the point that managed to find its way through a sea of bodies and end the game.

== Scoring statistics ==
| Name | Position | Games | Goals | Assists | Points | PIM |
|---|---|---|---|---|---|---|
| Ryan Walsh | C/RW | 36 | 17 | 14 | 31 | 21 |
| Dalton Bancroft | LW/RW | 36 | 15 | 12 | 27 | 48 |
| Sullivan Mack | C/LW | 32 | 9 | 15 | 24 | 19 |
| Tim Rego | D | 36 | 8 | 16 | 24 | 18 |
| Ondřej Pšenička | RW | 30 | 9 | 13 | 22 | 10 |
| Charlie Major | F | 28 | 5 | 13 | 18 | 6 |
| Jack O'Leary | F | 35 | 8 | 9 | 17 | 19 |
| Jonathan Castagna | C | 32 | 5 | 10 | 15 | 20 |
| Ben Robertson | D | 36 | 2 | 13 | 15 | 8 |
| Nick DeSantis | F | 33 | 8 | 6 | 14 | 24 |
| Kyler Kovich | LW | 36 | 5 | 9 | 14 | 25 |
| George Fegaras | D | 30 | 1 | 13 | 14 | 10 |
| Jake Kraft | C | 36 | 7 | 6 | 13 | 4 |
| Hoyt Stanley | D | 36 | 2 | 11 | 13 | 40 |
| Michael Suda | D | 36 | 0 | 11 | 11 | 24 |
| Kyle Penney | C | 25 | 6 | 1 | 7 | 15 |
| Hank Kempf | D | 36 | 2 | 5 | 7 | 18 |
| Tyler Catalano | C/RW | 36 | 2 | 4 | 6 | 26 |
| Jack O'Brien | D | 30 | 0 | 3 | 3 | 2 |
| Nicholas Wolfenberg | D | 13 | 1 | 1 | 2 | 2 |
| Remington Keopple | G | 5 | 0 | 1 | 1 | 0 |
| Jimmy Rayhill | D | 6 | 0 | 1 | 1 | 0 |
| Ian Shane | G | 34 | 0 | 1 | 1 | 2 |
| Marián Moško | D | 2 | 0 | 0 | 0 | 0 |
| Parker Murray | F | 4 | 0 | 0 | 0 | 2 |
| Sean Donaldson | LW | 16 | 0 | 0 | 0 | 19 |
| Bench | – | – | – | – | – | 0 |
| Total | | | 112 | 118 | 300 | 388 |

== Goaltending statistics ==
| Name | Games | Minutes | Wins | Losses | Ties | Goals against | Saves | Shut-outs | SV % | GAA |
|---|---|---|---|---|---|---|---|---|---|---|
| Remington Keopple | 5 | 209:37 | 2 | 0 | 0 | 3 | 68 | 1 | .958 | 0.86 |
| Ian Shane | 34 | 1978:41 | 17 | 11 | 6 | 73 | 692 | 3 | .905 | 2.21 |
| Empty Net | - | 25:44 | - | - | - | 6 | - | - | - | - |
| Total | 36 | 2214:02 | 19 | 11 | 6 | 82 | 760 | 4 | .903 | 2.22 |

== Rankings ==
| Poll | Week | | | | | | | | | | | | | | | | | | | | | | | | | | | |
| Poll | Pre | 1 | 2 | 3 | 4 | 5 | 6 | 7 | 8 | 9 | 10 | 11 | 12 | 13 | 14 | 15 | 16 | 17 | 18 | 19 | 20 | 21 | 22 | 23 | 24 | 25 | 26 | 27 (Final) |
|---|---|---|---|---|---|---|---|---|---|---|---|---|---|---|---|---|---|---|---|---|---|---|---|---|---|---|---|---|
| USCHO.com | 9 (2) | 7 (1) | 8 (1) | 8 (1) | 9 (1) | 6 (1) | 6 | 8 | 11 | 12 | 14 | 16 | – | 16 | 18 | RV | RV | RV | RV | NR | RV | RV | NR | RV | RV | 16 | – | 12 |
| USA Hockey | 9 (3) | 7 (2) | 7 (1) | 8 (1) | 8 (1) | 6 (1) | 5 | 7 | 11 | 12 | 14 | 17 | – | 16 | 20 | RV | 20 | RV | RV | NR | RV | 20 | RV | 20 | 19 | 16 | 12 | 11 |

Note: USCHO did not release a poll in week 12 or 26.
Note: USA Hockey did not release a poll in week 12.

== Awards and honors ==
| Player | Award | Ref |
|---|---|---|
| Ian Shane | ECAC Hockey Most Outstanding Player in Tournament | |
| Tim Rego | All-ECAC Hockey Third Team | |
| Ian Shane | ECAC Hockey All-Tournament Team | |
| Tim Rego | ECAC Hockey All-Tournament Team | |
| Jonathan Castagna | ECAC Hockey All-Tournament Team | |
| Nick DeSantis | ECAC Hockey All-Tournament Team | |
