= Damien Carfagna =

American ice hockey player (born 2002)

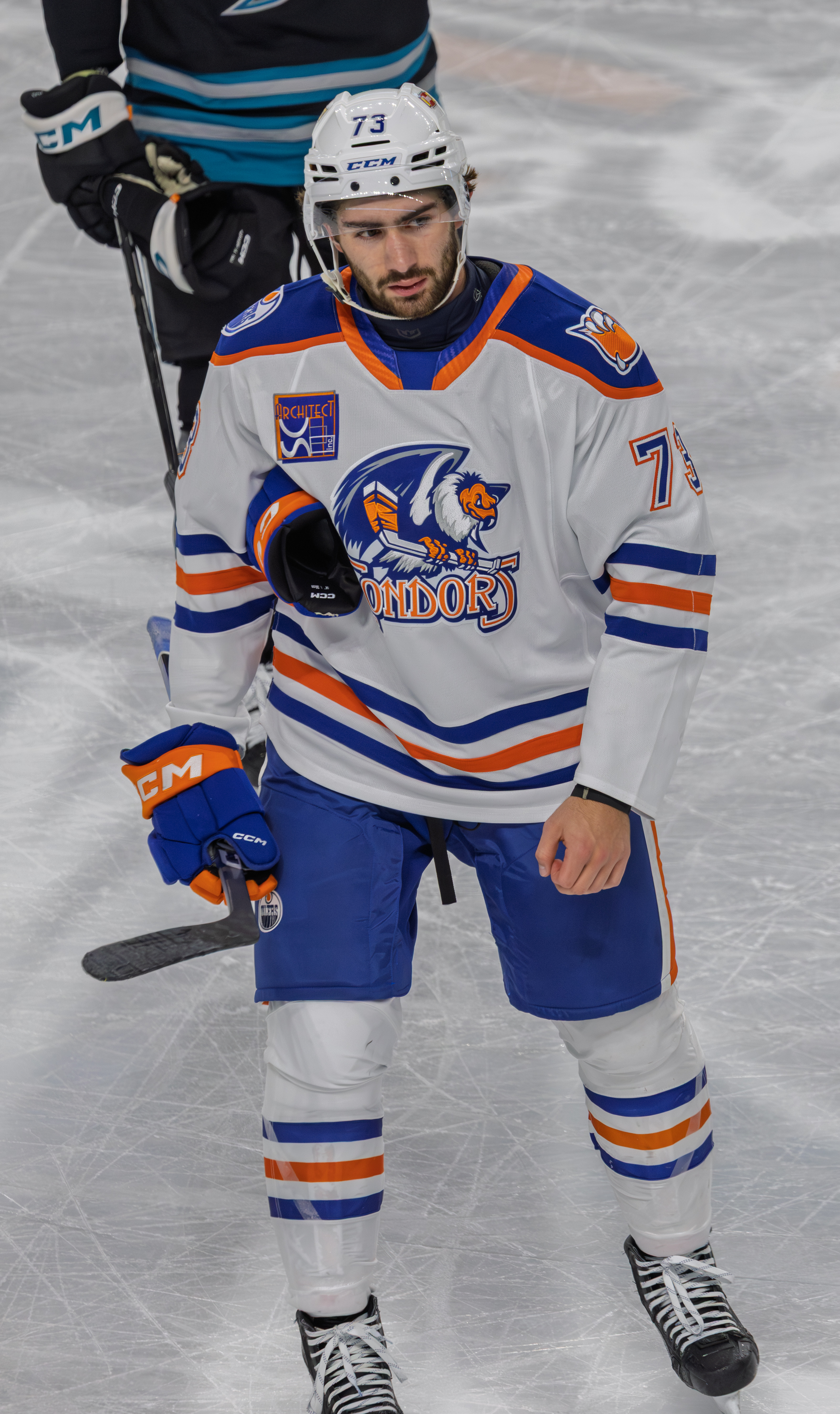
- Born: December 12, 2002 (age 23) Wood-Ridge, New Jersey, U.S.
- Height: 5 ft 11 in (180 cm)
- Weight: 190 lb (86 kg; 13 st 8 lb)
- Position: Defence
- Shoots: Left
- NHL team (P) Cur. team: Edmonton Oilers; Bakersfield Condors (AHL)
- NHL draft: Undrafted
- Playing career: 2025–present

Damien Carfagna (born December 12, 2002) is a professional ice hockey player who currently plays for the Bakersfield Condors of the American Hockey League (AHL) while under contract to the Edmonton Oilers of the National Hockey League (NHL).

== Playing career ==
After playing youth hockey, Carfagna played at the prep level at Don Bosco Preparatory High School and at Lawrence Academy. Carfagna began his college career with the New Hampshire Wildcats men's ice hockey team in the 2022-23 season; scoring 6 goals and 10 assists in 35 games.

He proceed to play the next two years at Ohio State University.

He signed his two-year entry level contract with the Edmonton Oilers on March 31, 2025. He made his AHL debut the following year on October 24, 2025.

== Career statistics ==
			Regular season					Playoffs
Season	Team	League	GP	G	A	Pts	PIM	GP	G	A	Pts	PIM
2020–21	Green Bay Gamblers	USHL	50	6	12	18	18	—	—	—	—	—
2021–22	Green Bay Gamblers	USHL	40	5	32	37	39	—	—	—	—	—
2021–22	Sioux City Musketeers	USHL	21	1	10	11	4	—	—	—	—	—
2022–23	New Hampshire University	HE	35	6	10	16	2	—	—	—	—	—
2023–24	Ohio State University	B1G	34	2	4	6	10	—	—	—	—	—
2024–25	Ohio State University	B1G	38	7	21	28	6	—	—	—	—	—
2025–26	Bakersfield Condors	AHL	66	7	15	22	24	—	—	—	—	—
AHL totals			66	7	15	22	24	—	—	—	—	—
