= Stephen Halliday (ice hockey) =

Canadian ice hockey player (born 2002)

- Halliday playing with Ohio State in March 2024
- Born: July 2, 2002 (age 24) Ajax, Ontario, Canada
- Height: 6 ft 4 in (193 cm)
- Weight: 214 lb (97 kg; 15 st 4 lb)
- Position: Forward
- Shoots: Left
- NHL team: Ottawa Senators
- NHL draft: 104th overall, 2022; Ottawa Senators
- Playing career: 2024–present

Stephen Halliday (born July 2, 2002) is a Canadian-American professional ice hockey player who is a forward for the Ottawa Senators of the National Hockey League (NHL).

== Early life ==
Halliday was born July 2, 2002, in Ajax, Ontario. He began playing ice hockey at the age of four under the encouragement of his father, a fan of the Toronto Maple Leafs of the National Hockey League (NHL). Halliday also played soccer, lacrosse, and tennis as a child. When he was 12, Halliday's family moved to Maryland for his father's job, but he soon moved back to Toronto and lived with his cousins to continue his hockey career. During the 2017–18 Greater Toronto Hockey League (GTHL) season, Halliday led the Toronto Marlboros with 36 goals and 83 points in 59 games.

== Playing career ==
=== Amateur ===
Rather than playing in the Ontario Hockey League (OHL), Halliday planned to spend two years in the United States Hockey League (USHL) before moving to college ice hockey in 2020. The Central Illinois Flying Aces selected Halliday first overall in the 2018 USHL Phase I draft. He played one season with Central Illinois recording ten goals and 34 points in 55 games. However, at the end of the season the Flying Aces folded and Halliday's rights were acquired by the Dubuque Fighting Saints in the dispersal draft. Halliday joined the Fighting Saints for the 2019–20 season in which he scored 13 goals and 38 points in 48 games. The end of the season was canceled on March 18, 2020 due to the COVID-19 pandemic. He returned to Dubuque for the 2020–21 season, making 52 appearances, scoring ten goals and 48 points, finishing second in team scoring. In two playoff games, he added one assist. In the following 2021–22 season, he set new scoring highs, recording 35 goals and 95 points in 62 games.

He originally committed to play collegiate hockey with the University of North Dakota in 2018, but on October 7, 2021, it was announced that Halliday had committed to Ohio State. He played his freshman year in the 2022–23 season, where he tallied nine goals and 41 points in 40 appearances, leading his team in scoring. Ohio State advanced to the regional final of the 2023 NCAA tournament but were eliminated by Quinnipiac. He returned for the 2023–24 season, scoring ten goals and 36 points in 38 appearances, leading his team in scoring for the second consecutive season.

=== Professional ===
Despite being eligible to be selected by National Hockey League (NHL) teams in 2020 NHL entry draft, he went undrafted. He was passed over a second time in the 2021 NHL entry draft. In his third time through the draft, Halliday was selected in the fourth round of the 2022 NHL entry draft by the Ottawa Senators. He signed an entry-level contract with Ottawa on March 22, 2024. He was assigned to Ottawa's American Hockey League (AHL) affiliate, the Belleville Senators, to finish the season, recording five assists in ten games. Belleville qualified for the 2024 Calder Cup playoffs and advanced to the second round where they were eliminated by the Cleveland Monsters. He led the team in scoring during the playoffs, recording two goals and nine points in seven playoff games. Halliday was assigned to Belleville for the 2024–25 season. In his first full AHL season, he tallied 19 goals and 51 points in 71 games.

After tallying 16 points in 15 games to start the 2025–26 season in the AHL with the Belleville Senators, Halliday made his NHL debut on November 20, 2025, replacing an injured Lars Eller, and earned his first NHL point with an assist on Shane Pinto's game-tying goal in a 3–2 win against the Anaheim Ducks. Halliday was returned to Belleville, but was called up in January 2026, and scored his first NHL goal on January 22, in a 5–3 loss to the Nashville Predators. In a split season between Ottawa and Belleville, he appeared in 30 NHL games, scoring four goals and 11 points and 29 AHL games, recording two goals and 29 points.

On May 5, it was announced that he signed a two-year, $2.15M extension with Ottawa.

== Career statistics ==
=== Regular season and playoffs ===
			Regular season					Playoffs
Season	Team	League	GP	G	A	Pts	PIM	GP	G	A	Pts	PIM
2018–19	Central Illinois Flying Aces	USHL	55	10	24	34	24	—	—	—	—	—
2019–20	Dubuque Fighting Saints	USHL	46	13	25	38	12	—	—	—	—	—
2020–21	Dubuque Fighting Saints	USHL	52	10	38	48	18	2	0	1	1	2
2021–22	Dubuque Fighting Saints	USHL	62	35	60	95	52	2	0	5	5	6
2022–23	Ohio State University	B1G	40	9	32	41	19	—	—	—	—	—
2023–24	Ohio State University	B1G	38	10	26	36	30	—	—	—	—	—
2023–24	Belleville Senators	AHL	10	0	5	5	2	7	2	7	9	0
2024–25	Belleville Senators	AHL	71	19	32	51	49	—	—	—	—	—
2025–26	Belleville Senators	AHL	29	2	27	29	16	—	—	—	—	—
2025–26	Ottawa Senators	NHL	30	4	7	11	2	—	—	—	—	—
NHL totals			30	4	7	11	2	—	—	—	—	—
