= Mitchell Miller (ice hockey) =

American ice hockey player

- Born: December 20, 2001 (age 24) Sylvania, Ohio, U.S.
- Height: 5 ft 10 in (178 cm)
- Weight: 180 lb (82 kg; 12 st 12 lb)
- Position: Defense
- Shoots: Right
- KHL team Former teams: Ak Bars Kazan; MHk 32 Liptovský Mikuláš
- NHL draft: 111th overall, 2020; Arizona Coyotes (rescinded)
- Playing career: 2023–present

Mitchell Miller (born December 20, 2001) is an American professional ice hockey defenseman for Ak Bars Kazan of the Kontinental Hockey League (KHL). He was drafted 111th overall by the Arizona Coyotes in the 2020 NHL entry draft, but the Coyotes renounced the rights to him after it emerged that he had repeatedly subjected a disabled black classmate to extreme bullying throughout multiple years of grade school. A commitment to join the University of North Dakota was also ended as a result of Miller's past conduct, and in 2021 he re-joined the Tri-City Storm. In November 2022, he signed an entry-level contract with the Boston Bruins, but the team parted ways with him after two days following intense backlash.

== Early life ==
Miller was born in Sylvania, Ohio on December 20, 2001, to John and Shelli Miller.

== Playing career ==
Starting in 2018, Miller played for the Cedar Rapids RoughRiders in the United States Hockey League (USHL). He played two games during the 2017–18 season, and stayed with the team for the entire 2018–19 season. During the season, he was called up to the United States men's national junior ice hockey team to play in the 2018 World Junior A Challenge. After the end of the 2018–19 USHL season, Miller was traded to the Tri-City Storm. Miller had committed to play for the Miami University men's ice hockey team and was expected to join the Red Hawks for the 2019–20 season. However, he de-committed, and opted to spend the 2019–20 season playing for Tri-City, where he finished the season with 33 points. He also earned an all-USHL first team selection, an honor bestowed on the best players in the league as determined by the votes of the league's general managers. He was once again called up to the United States junior team for the 2019 World Junior A Challenge where he had two goals and four assists in six games. In May 2020, Miller committed to play for the University of North Dakota men's ice hockey team.

At the 2020 NHL entry draft, the Arizona Coyotes used their first pick, in the 4th round (111th overall), to select Miller. On October 29, 2020, the Coyotes renounced the draft rights to Miller, after it emerged that he had repeatedly subjected a disabled black classmate to extreme bullying throughout multiple years of grade school. The next day, he was dropped from the University of North Dakota hockey team.

On November 4, 2022, Miller signed a three-year, entry-level contract with the Boston Bruins. The next day, NHL commissioner Gary Bettman stated that Miller was not eligible to play in the NHL, adding, "I can't tell you that he'll ever be eligible to come into the NHL."

On November 6, 2022, the Bruins parted ways with Miller following considerable pressure from fans and current Bruins players. The club stated it had severed ties with Miller, although he was still technically under contract with the Bruins at the time. As of December 23, 2022, he had earned over $116,000 from that contract.

In February 2023, the Bruins reached an agreement with Miller that permanently ended his association with the club. Miller received an undisclosed sum of money and was granted free agency, under a condition of confidentiality. The existence of the deal was not reported to the public until July 2023 in a New York Post article, which also stated that Mitchell was expected to try to play for a team in Europe.

On August 2, 2023, Miller signed with HK 32 Liptovský Mikuláš of the Slovak Extraliga. He played 19 games in Slovakia before signing with Ak Bars Kazan of the Kontinental Hockey League, where he is under contract through the 2026–27 season.

== Bullying incidents ==
In 2016, Miller and a classmate were found delinquent in an Ohio juvenile court on charges of assault and a violation of the Ohio Safe Schools Act. The pair were accused and found guilty of deceiving a developmentally disabled African American classmate, Isaiah Meyer-Crothers, into eating a piece of candy that they had wiped in a urinal, repeated bullying of Meyer-Crothers, and repeatedly calling him a nigger. Surveillance video also captured them kicking and punching Meyer-Crothers.

The bullying incidents resurfaced after The Arizona Republic published an in-depth report on Miller on October 26, 2020. The Republic exposé also revealed that Miller would frequently use the words "nigger" and "BROWNIE" to refer to Meyer-Crothers and often told him to "go pick their cotton". The Coyotes initially defended Miller, citing their desire to "be a part of the solution in a real way" and to help Miller grow from this incident and eventually become a leader against bullying and racism. Although Coyotes general manager Bill Armstrong did not draft Miller, he expressed the team's desire to provide Miller with a second chance.

According to the Republic, Miller apologized to the then 31 NHL teams (the Seattle Kraken had not formally joined the league at the time), but never to Meyer-Crothers or to his family. In a letter addressed to the Coyotes, Meyer-Crothers' mother, Joni, found Armstrong's comments demeaning to her son, stating that while Miller's classmate apologized to Meyer-Crothers, Miller himself was unwilling to show remorse. A juvenile court magistrate in Ohio concluded that Miller had absolutely no remorse for his actions against Meyer-Crothers and was merely upset that his reputation would be damaged by the situation. As a result of the exposé, the Coyotes received widespread criticism for drafting Miller. This ultimately led to the Coyotes renouncing their draft rights to Miller and cutting all ties with him. A day later, Miller was dropped from the University of North Dakota's hockey team as well. According to UND president Andrew Armacost, school officials and Miller's family mutually agreed that Miller should no longer be on the team.

More details about the bullying surfaced after The Independent published a detailed letter from the Meyer-Crothers family, reiterating that Miller has not apologized to the family, and detailing further accusations about Miller's behavior, including repeated use of the word "nigger", spitting in Meyer-Crothers' face, and smacking and punching Meyer-Crothers on the school bus starting as early as 1st grade. Miller claimed that his court-mandated apology letter was read to the Meyer-Crothers family, but the Meyer-Crothers family informed the Bruins that the apology was only made through social media.

== Career statistics ==
=== Regular season and playoffs ===
			Regular season					Playoffs
Season	Team	League	GP	G	A	Pts	PIM	GP	G	A	Pts	PIM
2017–18	Cedar Rapids RoughRiders	USHL	2	0	1	1	0	—	—	—	—	—
2018–19	Cedar Rapids RoughRiders	USHL	48	4	12	16	20	6	0	0	0	2
2019–20	Tri-City Storm	USHL	44	8	25	33	40	—	—	—	—	—
2021–22	Tri-City Storm	USHL	60	39	44	83	75	5	2	3	5	4
2023–24	MHk 32 Liptovský Mikuláš	Slovak	19	6	23	29	12	—	—	—	—	—
2023–24	Ak Bars Kazan	KHL	32	3	10	13	8	5	0	3	3	0
2024–25	Ak Bars Kazan	KHL	41	3	18	21	22	13	4	9	13	8
2025–26	Ak Bars Kazan	KHL	67	20	27	47	16	20	7	16	23	2
KHL totals			140	26	55	81	46	38	11	28	39	10

=== International ===
Year	Team	Event	GP	G	A	Pts	PIM
2018	United States	HG18	5	0	5	5	2
Junior totals			5	0	5	5	2
