= Cole O'Hara =

Canadian ice hockey player (born 2002)

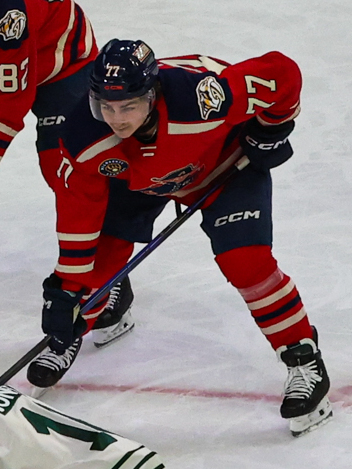
- O'Hara with the Milwaukee Admirals in 2026
- Born: June 20, 2002 (age 24) Richmond Hill, Ontario, Canada
- Height: 6 ft 0 in (183 cm)
- Weight: 189 lb (86 kg; 13 st 7 lb)
- Position: Right wing
- Shoots: Right
- NHL team (P) Cur. team: Nashville Predators; Milwaukee Admirals (AHL)
- NHL draft: 114th overall, 2022; Nashville Predators
- Playing career: 2025–present

Cole James O'Hara (born June 20, 2002) is a Canadian professional ice hockey player for the Milwaukee Admirals of the American Hockey League (AHL) as a prospect for the Nashville Predators of the National Hockey League (NHL). He played college ice hockey at UMass. He was drafted 114th overall by the Predators in the 2022 NHL entry draft.

== Playing career ==
=== Junior ===
O'Hara played two seasons for the Tri-City Storm. During the 2020–21 season, he recorded 11 goals and 17 assists in 53 games. During the 2021–22 season, he recorded 25 goals and 48 assists in 58 games.

=== College ===
O'Hara began his collegiate career for UMass during the 2022–23 season. During his freshman year he recorded four goals and 13 assists in 32 games. During the 2023–24 season, in his sophomore year, he recorded seven goals and 11 assists in 37 games.

During the 2024–25 season, in his junior year, he led his team in scoring with 22 goals and 29 assists in 40 games. His 51 points ranked tied for sixth among all NCAA players, while his 29 assists tied for the seventh-most in a single season in program history. He also tied James Marcou's program record for most points in a season with 51. On January 18, 2025, in a game against Merrimack, he recorded his first career hat-trick, and finished the game with a career-high tying four points. During conference play he recorded 13 goals and 16 assists in 24 games. He ranked in the top-five in points (tied fifth), goals (fifth), and assists (fourth). He scored at least a point in 31 of his 40 games, and posted a program-record 13-game point streak from January 18, 2025 to March 7, 2025. Following the season he was named to the All-Hockey East First Team, a New England Men's Division I All-Star, and a finalist for the Hockey East Player of the Year. He finished his collegiate career at UMass with 33 goals and 53 assists in 109 games.

=== Professional ===
On April 2, 2025, O'Hara signed a two-year, entry-level contract with the Nashville Predators, beginning during the 2025–26 season. He was assigned to the Predators' AHL affiliate, the Milwaukee Admirals, for the remainder of the 2024–25 season..

Cole made his NHL debut on the last day of the 2025–26 season on April 16, 2026 where he got his first career point, which was an assist on a Steven Stamkos goal in a 5–4 loss to the Anaheim Ducks.

== Personal life ==
O'Hara was born to Mike and Betty O'Hara, and has two siblings, Jake and Megan.

== Career statistics ==
			Regular season					Playoffs
Season	Team	League	GP	G	A	Pts	PIM	GP	G	A	Pts	PIM
2018–19	North York Rangers	OJHL	53	11	31	42	24	16	3	8	11	4
2019–20	North York Rangers	OJHL	51	21	43	64	50	5	3	5	8	11
2020–21	Tri-City Storm	USHL	49	11	17	28	20	3	1	0	1	2
2021–22	Tri-City Storm	USHL	58	25	48	73	47	5	2	6	8	0
2022–23	UMass-Amherst	HE	32	4	13	17	14	—	—	—	—	—
2023–24	UMass-Amherst	HE	37	7	11	18	18	—	—	—	—	—
2024–25	UMass-Amherst	HE	40	22	29	51	14	—	—	—	—	—
2024–25	Milwaukee Admirals	AHL	2	1	0	1	4	—	—	—	—	—
2025–26	Milwaukee Admirals	AHL	67	19	25	44	12	3	1	1	2	0
2025–26	Nashville Predators	NHL	1	0	1	1	0	—	—	—	—	—
NHL totals			1	0	1	1	0	—	—	—	—	—

== Awards and honors ==
Award	Year	Ref
College
All-Hockey East First Team	2025	
AHCA East First Team All-American	2025	
