= 2021–22 USHL season =

- League: United States Hockey League
- Sport: Ice hockey
- Duration: September 23, 2021 – May 21, 2022
- Games: 62
- Teams: 16

Draft
- Top draft pick: Justin Janicke
- Picked by: Dubuque Fighting Saints

Regular season
- Anderson Cup: Tri-City Storm
- Season MVP: Mitchell Miller (Tri-City Storm)
- Top scorer: Jeremy Wilmer (Tri-City Storm)

Clark Cup Playoffs
- Clark Cup Playoffs MVP: Alex Tracy (Musketeers)
- Finals champions: Sioux City Musketeers
- Runners-up: Madison Capitols

USHL seasons
- 2020–21 2022–23

The 2021–22 USHL season was the 43rd season of the United States Hockey League as an all-junior league.

The Cedar Rapids RoughRiders and Madison Capitols returned from their hiatus for this season. The RoughRiders' absence was due to derecho damage to ImOn Ice Arena, while the Capitols was caused by COVID-19 pandemic restrictions in Madison, Wisconsin.

The regular season ran from September 23, 2021, to April 23, 2022, with a 62-game schedule for each team. The Western Conference champions Tri-City Storm were awarded the Anderson Cup for accumulating 98 points. The Western Conference runners-up Sioux City Musketeers won the Clark Cup playoff championship.

== Regular season ==
Final standings:

=== Eastern Conference ===
Team	GP	W	L	OTL	SOL	PTS	GF	GA
z – Chicago Steel	62	39	13	9	1	88	254	196
x – Dubuque Fighting Saints	62	40	16	3	3	86	254	199
x – Muskegon Lumberjacks	62	40	16	3	3	72	256	252
x – Youngstown Phantoms	62	29	23	6	4	68	191	199
x – Madison Capitols	62	30	29	3	0	63	233	233
x – Cedar Rapids RoughRiders	62	29	29	2	2	62	187	213
Team USA	62	27	29	5	1	60	253	253
Green Bay Gamblers	62	23	24	3	2	51	195	266

=== Western Conference ===
Team	GP	W	L	OTL	SOL	PTS	GF	GA
y – Tri-City Storm	62	47	11	3	1	98	260	138
x – Sioux City Musketeers	62	41	16	4	1	87	238	169
x – Lincoln Stars	62	35	20	3	4	77	226	208
x – Omaha Lancers	62	30	26	4	2	66	172	201
x – Fargo Force	62	28	28	4	2	62	187	207
x – Waterloo Black Hawks	62	28	30	3	1	60	182	197
Sioux Falls Stampede	62	19	37	3	3	44	152	237
Des Moines Buccaneers	62	18	39	3	2	41	166	238

x = clinched playoff berth; y = clinched conference title; z = clinched regular season title

== Statistical leaders ==
=== Scoring leaders ===
Players are listed by points, then goals.

Note: GP = Games played; G = Goals; A = Assists; Pts. = Points; PIM = Penalty minutes

Player	Team	GP	G	A	Pts	PIM
Jeremy Wilmer	Tri-City Storm	60	25	73	98	82
Stephen Halliday	Dubuque Fighting Saints	62	35	60	95	52
Mitchell Miller	Tri-City Storm	60	39	44	83	75
Aidan Thompson	Lincoln Stars	57	24	58	82	52
Connor Kurth	Dubuque Fighting Saints	62	35	46	81	40
Jackson Blake	Chicago Steel	61	27	50	77	16
Adam Fantilli	Chicago Steel	54	37	37	74	93
Quinn Hutson	Muskegon Lumberjacks	59	33	40	73	83
Cole O'Hara	Tri-City Storm	58	25	48	73	47
Owen McLaughlin	Sioux City Musketeers	62	28	44	72	16
Ilya Nikolaev	Tri-City Storm	58	23	49	72	83

=== Leading goaltenders ===
Note: GP = Games played; Mins = Minutes played; W = Wins; L = Losses; OTL = Overtime losses; SOL = Shootout losses; SO = Shutouts; GAA = Goals against average; SV% = Save percentage

Player	Team	GP	Mins	W	L	OTL	SOL	SO	GAA	SV%
Arsenii Sergeev	Tri-City Storm	41	2313	30	6	1	1	6	2.08	0.918
Alex Tracy	Sioux City Musketeers	44	2427	27	10	3	0	3	2.50	0.918
Jack Williams	Waterloo Black Hawks	25	1429	11	11	0	1	3	2.60	0.908
Kevin Pasche	Omaha Lancers	43	1429	20	19	2	2	1	2.87	0.903
Philip Svedebäck	Dubuque Fighting Saints	25	1426	15	7	2	1	0	2.95	0.910

== Clark Cup playoffs ==
Final results:

First Round (Best-of-3)
E4	Youngstown	0
E5	Madison	2
E3	Muskegon	2
E6	Cedar Rapids	0
W4	Omaha	2
W5	Fargo	0
W3	Lincoln	1
W6	Waterloo	2

Conference Semifinals (Best-of-3)
E1	Chicago	1
E5	Madison	2
Eastern Conference
E2	Dubuque	0
E3	Muskegon	2
W1	Tri-City	2
W4	Omaha	0
Western Conference
W2	Sioux City	2
W6	Waterloo	1

Conference Finals (Best-of-5)
E5	Madison	3
E3	Muskegon	2
W1	Tri-City	0
W2	Sioux City	3

Clark Cup Championship (Best-of-5)
E5	Madison	1
W2	Sioux City	3

== First Round ==
=== Eastern Conference ===
==== (E4) Youngstown Phantoms vs. (E5) Madison Capitols ====
April 25	Youngstown Phantoms	2 – 3	Madison Capitols	Covelli Centre
No scoring		First period	Tyler Haskins (1) - 15:06
1:55 - William Whitelaw (1)		Second period	No scoring
14:29 - Tiernan Shoudy (1)		Third period	Jack Horbach (1) - 15:16; Jack Musa (1) - 17:06
Jacob Fowler (24 saves / 27 shots)		Goalie stats	Simon Latkoczy (18 saves / 20 shots)

April 26	Youngstown Phantoms	3 – 5	Madison Capitols	Covelli Centre
14:51 - pp - Garrett Wright (1)		First period	No scoring
No scoring		Second period	Reid Pabich (1) - 2:34
16:43 - Adam Ingram (1); 19:54 - Jaden Grant (1)		Third period	Jake Dunlap (1) - 1:13; Jack Musa (2) - 4:47; Quinn Finley (1) - en - 18:04; Jake Dunlap (2) - en - 19:04
Kyle Chauvette (26 saves / 29 shots)		Goalie stats	Simon Latkoczy (31 saves / 34 shots)

Madison wins series 2 – 0

==== (E3) Muskegon Lumberjacks vs. (E6) Cedar Rapids RoughRiders ====
April 25	Muskegon Lumberjacks	6 – 0	Cedar Rapids RoughRiders	Mercy Health Arena
14:52 - pp - Owen Mehlenbacher (1)		First period	No scoring
6:27 - Phillip Tresca (1); 13:26 - Quinn Hutson (1); 17:33 - pp - Jack Williams (1)		Second period	No scoring
9:40 - Noah Ellis (1); 14:32 - sh - Owen Mehlenbacher (2)		Third period	No scoring
Chase Clark (31 saves / 31 shots)		Goalie stats	Bruno Brūveris (23 saves / 27 shots); Connor Hasley (11 saves / 13 shots)

April 26	Muskegon Lumberjacks	6 – 1	Cedar Rapids RoughRiders	Mercy Health Arena
4:01 - pp - Jake Richard (1)		First period	No scoring
4:56 - Jacob Braccini (1); 13:09 - Nathan McBrayer (1)		Second period	No scoring
4:47 - pp - Jacob Guevin (1); 5:12 - pp - Noah Ellis (2); 7:09 - Quinn Hutson (2)		Third period	Martins Laviņš (1) - 18:36
Chase Clark (33 saves / 34 shots)		Goalie stats	Bruno Brūveris (24 saves / 29 shots); Connor Hasley (7 saves / 8 shots)

Muskegon wins series 2 – 0

=== Western Conference ===
==== (E4) Omaha Lancers vs. (E5) Fargo Force ====
April 25	Omaha Lancers	5 – 2	Fargo Force	Liberty First Credit Union Arena
3:34 - Morgan Winters (1)		First period	No scoring
18:39 - Nate Benoit (1)		Second period	No scoring
1:45 - pp - Jared Wright (1); 5:33 - pp - Cam Mitchell (1); 18:18 - en - Vincent Salice (1)		Third period	Trevor Griebel (1) - 4:53; Thomas Weis (1) - 11:08
Kevin Pasche (22 saves / 24 shots)		Goalie stats	Matej Marinov (19 saves / 23 shots)

April 26	Omaha Lancers	4 – 2	Fargo Force	Liberty First Credit Union Arena
9:40 - Alex Bump (1)		First period	Bret Link (1) - 8:39
5:59 - Evan Werner (1)		Second period	No scoring
8:54 - Evan Werner (2); 19:17 - en - Michael Cameron (1)		Third period	Kyle Smolen (1) - pp - 12:02
Kevin Pasche (22 saves / 24 shots)		Goalie stats	Louden Hogg (20 saves / 23 shots)

Omaha wins series 2 – 0

==== (W3) Lincoln Stars vs. (W6) Waterloo Black Hawks ====
April 25	Lincoln Stars	5 – 2	Waterloo Black Hawks	Ice Box
5:24 - Killian Kiecker-Olson (1); 9:11 - Lucas Wahlin (1); Henry Nelson		First period	No scoring
1:15 - Mason Marcellus (1)		Second period	Garrett Schifsky (1) - 1:04; Garrett Schifsky (2) - 15:05
19:59 - en - Lucas Wahlin (2)		Third period	No scoring
Kaidan Mbereko (30 saves / 32 shots)		Goalie stats	Emmett Croteau (33 saves / 37 shots)

April 26	Lincoln Stars	2 – 3	Waterloo Black Hawks	Ice Box
7:19 - Yu Sato (1)		First period	Garrett Schifsky (3) - 6:07; Gavin Lindberg (1) - 14:26; Tucker Ness (1) - 15:32
No scoring		Second period	No scoring
16:57 - Lucas Wahlin (3)		Third period	No scoring
Kaidan Mbereko (15 saves / 18 shots)		Goalie stats	Emmett Croteau (35 saves / 37 shots)

April 27	Lincoln Stars	4 – 5	OT	Waterloo Black Hawks	Ice Box
Killian Kiecker-Olson (2) - pp - 6:38; Noah Laba (1) - 10:54; Lucas Wahlin (4) - sh - 18:53		First period		19:48 - pp - Connor Brown (1)
No scoring		Second period		No scoring
Killian Kiecker-Olson (3) - 7:34		Third period		1:59 - Gavin Lindberg (2); 17:05 - Connor Brown (2); 18:04 - Connor Brown (3)
No scoring		First overtime period		1:21 - Connor Brown (4)
Kaidan Mbereko (28 saves / 33 shots)		Goalie stats		Emmett Croteau (22 saves / 26 shots)

Waterloo wins series 2 – 1

== Conference Semifinals ==
=== Eastern Conference ===
==== (E1) Chicago Steel vs. (E5) Madison Capitols ====
April 30	Madison Capitols	4 – 2	Chicago Steel	Bob Suter's Capitol Ice Arena
Jack Horbach (2) - 8:11		First period	No scoring
Jack Musa (3) - 10:35; Casey Severo (1) - pp - 19:18		Second period	15:27 - Lukas Gustafsson (1)
Jake Dunlap (3) - en - 19:00		Third period	18:40 - Jackson Blake (1)
Simon Latkoczy (30 saves / 32 shots)		Goalie stats	Christian Manz (31 saves / 34 shots)

May 2	Chicago Steel	2 – 0	Madison Capitols	Fox Valley Ice Arena
No scoring		First period	No scoring
5:34 - pp - Sam Lipkin (1); 8:25 - Joe Miller (1)		Second period	No scoring
No scoring		Third period	No scoring
Christian Manz (26 saves / 26 shots)		Goalie stats	Simon Latkoczy (22 saves / 24 shots)

May 3	Chicago Steel	2 – 4	Madison Capitols	Fox Valley Ice Arena
Jayden Perron (1) - 16:51		First period	No scoring
Nicholas Moldenhauer (1) - pp - 5:27		Second period	5:36 - Jake Dunlap (4); 13:26 - Jack Musa (4); 17:48 - pp - Luke Mittelstadt (1)
No scoring		Third period	19:43 - en - Jake Dunlap (5)
Christian Manz (26 saves / 29 shots)		Goalie stats	Simon Latkoczy (28 saves / 30 shots)

Madison wins series 2 – 1

==== (E2) Dubuque Fighting Saints vs. (E3) Muskegon Lumberjacks ====
April 29	Muskegon Lumberjacks	3 – 4	Dubuque Fighting Saints	Mercy Health Arena
7:10 - pp - Jacob Guevin (2); 10:02 - Quinn Hutson (3)		First period	No scoring
8:05 - Ethan Whitcomb (1)		Second period	Connor Kurth (1) - pp - 0:52; Michael Feenstra (1) - 5:07
10:38 - pp - Jack Williams (2)		Third period	Lucas Ölvestad (1) - pp - 14:56
Chase Clark (30 saves / 33 shots)		Goalie stats	Philip Svedebäck (6 saves / 8 shots); Paxton Geisel (18 saves / 20 shots)

May 1	Dubuque Fighting Saints	5 – 8	Muskegon Lumberjacks	Mystique Ice Center
No scoring		First period	Owen Mehlenbacher (3) - 1:35; Quinn Hutson (4) - 7:07; Ben Strinden (1) - pp - 19:54
0:54 - pp - Nikita Borodayenko (1); 15:46 - Ryan Beck (1)		Second period	Quinn Hutson (5) - 11:02; Tyler Hotson (1) - 14:01
4:41 - pp - Kenny Connors (1); 4:51 - Ryan Beck (2); 10:52 - pp - Connor Kurth (2)		Third period	Tyler Hotson (2) - 12:34; Quinn Hutson (6) - en - 18:01; Ben Strinden (2) - en - 18:22
Paxton Geisel (19 saves / 25 shots)		Goalie stats	Chase Clark (41 saves / 46 shots)

Muskegon wins series 2 – 0

=== Western Conference ===
==== (W1) Tri-City Storm vs. (W4) Omaha Lancers ====
April 30	Tri-City Storm	7 – 4	Omaha Lancers	Viaero Center
3:42 - Cole O'Hara (1); 4:31 - Kieran Cebrian (1)		First period	No scoring
2:39 - pp - Victor Czerneckianair (1); 4:49 - Ilya Nikolaev (1); 12:03 - Ilya Nikolaev (2)		Second period	Evan Werner (3) - pp - 11:01; Evan Werner (4) - 12:52; Alex Bump (2) - pp - 15:06
4:45 - Mitchell Miller (1); 19:06 - en - Joshua Eernisse (1)		Third period	Evan Werner (5) - 11:29
Arsenii Sergeev (19 saves / 23 shots)		Goalie stats	Kevin Pasche (34 saves / 40 shots)

May 2	Omaha Lancers	0 – 4	Tri-City Storm	Liberty First Credit Union Arena
No scoring		First period	Ilya Nikolaev (3) - 6:22
No scoring		Second period	Ilya Nikolaev (4) - 1:42; Dane Dowiak (1) - pp - 9:52
No scoring		Third period	Lleyton Roed (1) - pp - 14:36
Kevin Pasche (29 saves / 33 shots)		Goalie stats	Arsenii Sergeev (17 saves / 17 shots)

Tri-City wins series 2 – 0

==== (W2) Sioux City Musketeers vs. (W6) Waterloo Black Hawks ====
April 30	Waterloo Black Hawks	1 – 3	Sioux City Musketeers	Young Arena
No scoring		First period	4:35 - Ben Steeves (1)
No scoring		Second period	7:53 - Bennett Schimek (1)
Tyler Kostelecky (1) - 17:36		Third period	2:56 - Luke Antonacci (1)
Emmett Croteau (34 saves / 37 shots)		Goalie stats	Alex Tracy (28 saves / 29 shots)

May 1	Sioux City Musketeers	1 – 2	Waterloo Black Hawks	Tyson Events Center
1:26 - pp - Ben Steeves (2)		First period	Ray Fust (1) - 9:52
No scoring		Second period	Tucker Ness (2) - pp - 16:05
No scoring		Third period	No scoring
Alex Tracy (16 saves / 18 shots)		Goalie stats	Emmett Croteau (24 saves / 25 shots)

May 2	Sioux City Musketeers	3 – 0	Waterloo Black Hawks	Tyson Events Center
Tabor Heaslip (1) - 17:25		First period	No scoring
No scoring		Second period	No scoring
Tomi Leppänen (1) - 7:24; Ben Steeves (3) - en - 19:15		Third period	No scoring
Alex Tracy (16 saves / 16 shots)		Goalie stats	Emmett Croteau (20 saves / 22 shots)

Sioux City wins series 2 – 1

== Conference Finals ==
=== Eastern Conference ===
==== (E3) Muskegon Lumberjacks vs. (E5) Madison Capitols ====
May 6	Muskegon Lumberjacks	5 – 2	Madison Capitols	Mercy Health Arena
7:50 - Phillip Tresca (2)		First period	Jack Musa (5) - 9:16
6:50 - David Hymovitch (1); 8:20 - sh - Phillip Tresca (3); 17:52 - pp - Jacob Guevin (3)		Second period	Nick DeSantis (1) - 3:58
3:54 - Joey Larson (1)		Third period	No scoring
Chase Clark (37 saves / 39 shots)		Goalie stats	Simon Latkoczy (21 saves / 26 shots)

May 7	Muskegon Lumberjacks	3 – 4	OT	Madison Capitols	Mercy Health Arena
0:18 - Jack Williams (3); 19:53 - Jake Richard (2)		First period		Reid Pabich (2) - 3:50
3:43 - Nathan McBrayer (2)		Second period		Ben Dexheimer (1) - 14:40
No scoring		Third period		Matthew McGroarty (1) - 2:30
No scoring		First overtime period		Jake Dunlap (6) - 1:21
Chase Clark (20 saves / 24 shots)		Goalie stats		Simon Latkoczy (28 saves / 31 shots)

May 9	Madison Capitols	3 – 4	OT	Muskegon Lumberjacks	Bob Suter's Capitol Ice Arena
19:47 - Quinn Finley (2)		First period		No scoring
7:08 - Casey Severo (2)		Second period		Joey Larson (2) - 2:02; Jack Williams (4) - 15:55
0:54 - Tyler Haskins (2)		Third period		Noah Ellis (3) - 17:04
No scoring		First overtime period		Joey Larson (3) - 15:22
Simon Latkoczy (30 saves / 34 shots)		Goalie stats		Chase Clark (43 saves / 46 shots)

May 10	Madison Capitols	3 – 1	Muskegon Lumberjacks	Bob Suter's Capitol Ice Arena
No scoring		First period	No scoring
0:31 - Nick DeSantis (2); 5:24 - Ben Dexheimer (2); 18:24 - Quinn Finley (3)		Second period	No scoring
No scoring		Third period	Quinn Hutson (7) - 11:51
Simon Latkoczy (22 saves / 23 shots)		Goalie stats	Chase Clark (34 saves / 37 shots)

May 12	Muskegon Lumberjacks	4 – 8	Madison Capitols	Mercy Health Arena
8:03 - pp - Joey Larson (4)		First period	No scoring
No scoring		Second period	Tyler Haskins (3) - 1:06; D.J. Hart (1) - 2:20; Jack Musa (6) - 9:30
8:25 - Jacob Braccini (2); 12:04 - pp - Ben Strinden (3); 15:38 - pp - Owen Mehlenbacher (4)		Third period	Reid Pabich (3) - 4:08; Jack Musa (7) - 5:11; Luke Mittelstadt (2) - 7:29; Reid Pabich (4) - 12:32; Kyle Kukkonen (1) - en - 17:13
Chase Clark (33 saves / 40 shots)		Goalie stats	Simon Latkoczy (28 saves / 32 shots)

Madison wins series 3 – 2

=== Western Conference ===
==== (W1) Tri-City Storm vs. (W2) Sioux City Musketeers ====
May 6	Tri-City Storm	4 – 5	Sioux City Musketeers	Viaero Center
3:06 - Cole O'Hara (2)		First period	Ben Steeves (4) - 15:40
0:54 - sh - Gavin Brindley (1); 7:42 - Graham Gamache (1); 9:20 - Mitchell Miller (2)		Second period	Dylan James (1) - 9:41; Charlie Schoen (1) - pp - 11:08
No scoring		Third period	Nick Pierre (1) - 3:22; Bennett Schimek (2) - 19:55
Arsenii Sergeev (20 saves / 25 shots); Sebastian Wraneschitz (0 saves / 0 shots)		Goalie stats	Alex Tracy (35 saves / 39 shots)

May 7	Tri-City Storm	3 – 4	Sioux City Musketeers	Viaero Center
No scoring		First period	Nick Pierre (2) - 6:12; Dylan James (2) - 9:51; Ben Steeves (5) - 16:13; Ben Steeves (6) - pp - 19:58
16:32 - Jeremy Wilmer (1)		Second period	No scoring
3:40 - Drew Montgomery (1); 10:57 - Ilya Nikolaev (5)		Third period	No scoring
Sebastian Wraneschitz (7 saves / 11 shots); Arsenii Sergeev (10 saves / 10 shots)		Goalie stats	Alex Tracy (21 saves / 24 shots)

May 10	Sioux City Musketeers	2 – 0	Tri-City Storm	Tyson Events Center
No scoring		First period	No scoring
12:20 - Grant Slukynsky (1)		Second period	No scoring
19:59 - en - Ben Doran (1)		Third period	No scoring
Alex Tracy (31 saves / 31 shots)		Goalie stats	Arsenii Sergeev (17 saves / 18 shots)

Sioux City wins series 3 – 0

== Clark Cup Finals ==
=== (W2) Sioux City Musketeers vs. (E5) Madison Capitols ===
May 15	Sioux City Musketeers	2 – 3	Madison Capitols	Tyson Events Center
No scoring		First period	Quinn Finley (4) - 8:30; Tyler Haskins (4) - 19:12
1:24 - Dylan James (1)		Second period	Luke Mittelstadt (3) - pp - 7:43
9:54 - Samuel Deckhut (1)		Third period	No scoring
Alex Tracy (16 saves / 19 shots)		Goalie stats	Simon Latkoczy (32 saves / 34 shots)

May 16	Sioux City Musketeers	3 – 0	Madison Capitols	Tyson Events Center
19:22 - Ralfs Bergmanis (1)		First period	No scoring
No scoring		Second period	No scoring
7:05 - Bennett Schimek (3); 19:31 - en - Owen Fowler (1)		Third period	No scoring
Alex Tracy (20 saves / 20 shots)		Goalie stats	Simon Latkoczy (24 saves / 26 shots)

May 20	Madison Capitols	2 – 3	Sioux City Musketeers	Bob Suter's Capitol Ice Arena
13:38 - pp - Luke Mittelstadt (4); 18:50 - Quinn Finley (5)		First period	Dylan James (4) - 4:11
No scoring		Second period	Ben Doran (2) - 16:26
No scoring		Third period	Dylan James (5) - 16:16
Simon Latkoczy (30 saves / 33 shots)		Goalie stats	Alex Tracy (31 saves / 33 shots)

May 21	Madison Capitols	1 – 2	OT	Sioux City Musketeers	Bob Suter's Capitol Ice Arena
No scoring		First period		No scoring
No scoring		Second period		No scoring
14:01 - pp - Luke Mittelstadt (5)		Third period		Charlie Schoen (2) - 11:40
No scoring		First overtime period		Nick Pierre (3) - 5:48
Simon Latkoczy (35 saves / 37 shots)		Goalie stats		Alex Tracy (23 saves / 24 shots)

Sioux City wins series 3 – 1

== Playoff scoring leaders ==
Note: GP = Games played; G = Goals; A = Assists; Pts = Points; PIM = Penalty minutes

Player	Team	GP	G	A	Pts	PIM
Joey Larson	Muskegon Lumberjacks	9	4	13	17	6
Quinn Hutson	Muskegon Lumberjacks	9	7	9	16	8
Jake Dunlap	Madison Capitols	14	6	6	12	2
Jack Williams	Muskegon Lumberjacks	9	4	7	11	4
Reid Pabich	Madison Capitols	14	4	7	11	8
Ben Steeves	Sioux City Musketeers	10	6	4	10	4
Quinn Finley	Madison Capitols	14	5	5	10	2
Jacob Guevin	Muskegon Lumberjacks	9	3	7	10	22
Ben Dexheimer	Madison Capitols	14	2	8	10	0
Luke Mittelstadt	Madison Capitols	14	5	4	9	0

== Playoff leading goaltenders ==
Note: GP = Games played; Mins = Minutes played; W = Wins; L = Losses; GA = Goals Allowed; SO = Shutouts; SV% = Save percentage; GAA = Goals against average

Player	Team	GP	Mins	W	L	GA	SO	SV%	GAA
Alex Tracy	Sioux City Musketeers	8	603	8	2	16	3	.937	1.59
Arsenii Sergeev	Tri-City Storm	5	277	2	2	10	1	.892	2.17
Christian Manz	Chicago Steel	3	177	1	2	7	1	.922	2.37
Simon Latkoczy	Madison Capitols	14	861	8	6	37	0	.911	2.58
Emmett Croteau	Waterloo Black Hawks	6	354	3	3	16	0	.913	2.71

== Postseason awards ==
=== USHL awards ===
Award	Name	Team
Player of the Year	Mitchell Miller	Tri-City Storm
Forward of the Year	Jeremy Wilmer	Tri-City Storm
Defenseman of the Year	Mitchell Miller	Tri-City Storm
Rookie of the Year	Dylan James	Sioux City Musketeers
Goaltender of the Year	Arsenii Sergeev	Tri-City Storm
Coach of the Year	Anthony Noreen	Tri-City Storm
Student-Athlete	Keaton Peters	Lincoln Stars
Curt Hammer	Stephen Halliday	Dubuque Fighting Saints
Curt Hammer	Michael Cameron	Omaha Lancers
General Manager of the Year	Andy Johnson	Sioux City Musketeers

=== All-USHL First Team ===
Pos	Name	Team
G	Arsenii Sergeev	Tri-City
D	Mitchell Miller	Tri-City
D	Luke Mittelstadt	Madison
F	Stephen Halliday	Dubuque
F	Jeremy Wilmer	Tri-City
F	Adam Fantilli	Chicago

=== All-USHL Second Team ===
Pos	Name	Team
G	Kevin Pasche	Omaha
D	Dalton Norris	Lincoln
D	Jacob Guevin	Muskegon
F	Aidan Thompson	Lincoln
F	Quinn Hutson	Lincoln
F	Connor Kurth	Dubuque

=== All-USHL Third Team ===
Pos	Name	Team
G	Alex Tracy	Sioux City
D	Damien Carfagna	Sioux City
D	Trey Taylor	Youngstown
F	Ben Steeves	Sioux City
F	Owen McLaughlin	Sioux City
F	Jackson Blake	Chicago

=== USHL All-Rookie Team ===
Pos	Name	Team
G	Paxton Geisel	Dubuque
D	Andrew Strathmann	Tri-City
D	Antonio Fernandez	Lincoln
F	Dylan James	Sioux City
F	Adam Ingram	Youngstown
F	Cole Knuble	Fargo

=== All-Rookie Second Team ===
Pos	Name	Team
G	Jacob Fowler	Youngstown
D	Kent Anderson	Green Bay
D	Nathan McBrayer	Muskegon
F	Cameron Lund	Green Bay
F	Jayden Perron	Chicago
F	Nick Moldenhauer	Chicago
