= Ben Dexheimer =

American ice hockey player (born 2002)

- Dexheimer with Wisconsin in 2026
- Born: June 21, 2002 (age 24) Edina, Minnesota, U.S.
- Height: 5 ft 10 in (178 cm)
- Weight: 172 lb (78 kg; 12 st 4 lb)
- Position: Defense
- Shoots: Right
- NHL team (P) Cur. team: Minnesota Wild; Iowa Wild (AHL)
- NHL draft: Undrafted
- Playing career: 2026–present

Ben Dexheimer (born June 21, 2002) is an American professional ice hockey defenseman for the Iowa Wild of the American Hockey League (AHL) while under contract as a prospect to the Minnesota Wild of the National Hockey League (NHL).

== Playing career ==
=== Junior ===
Dexheimer played for the Madison Capitols during the 2021–22 season, where he recorded eight goals and 39 assists in 60 regular season games. He also scored two goals and eight assists in 18 playoff games.

=== College ===
On February 2, 2022, Dexheimer committed to play college ice hockey at the University of Wisconsin. During the 2022–23 season, in his freshman year, he appeared in all 35 games and recorded 11 assists, and 29 blocked shots. During the 2023–24 season, in his sophomore year, he appeared in all 40 games and recorded five goals and 23 assists, to lead all defensemen on the team in goals, assists and points. He scored his first career goal on November 18, 2023, against Michigan State. During the 2024–25 season, in his junior year, he recorded one goal and 16 assists in 35 games, and led the team with 58 blocked shots.

On October 1, 2025, he was named captain for the 2025–26 season. In his senior year, he recorded seven goals and 20 assists in 37 games, to lead all defensemen on the team in points. Following the season he was named to the All-Big Ten First Team, becoming the third Badgers defenseman in program history to receive the honor. During the regional finals of the 2026 NCAA Division I men's ice hockey tournament against Michigan State, he scored the game-winning overtime goal to help Wisconsin advance to the Frozen Four for the first time since 2010.

=== Professional ===
On April 15, 2026, Dexheimer signed a one-year entry-level contract with the Minnesota Wild, beginning in the 2026–27 season.

== Personal life ==
Dexheimer was born to Heather and Karl Dexheimer, and has two brothers, Finn and Barrett.

== Career statistics ==
			Regular season					Playoffs
Season	Team	League	GP	G	A	Pts	PIM	GP	G	A	Pts	PIM
2020–21	Austin Bruins	NAHL	46	6	17	23	24	—	—	—	—	—
2021–22	Madison Capitols	USHL	60	8	39	47	38	14	2	8	10	0
2022–23	University of Wisconsin	B1G	35	0	11	11	12	—	—	—	—	—
2023–24	University of Wisconsin	B1G	40	5	23	28	16	—	—	—	—	—
2024–25	University of Wisconsin	B1G	35	1	16	17	2	—	—	—	—	—
2025–26	University of Wisconsin	B1G	39	7	21	28	10	—	—	—	—	—
2025–26	Iowa Wild	AHL	2	0	0	0	0	—	—	—	—	—
AHL totals			2	0	0	0	0	—	—	—	—	—

== Awards and honors ==
Award	Year	Ref
College
All-Big Ten First Team	2026	
