= Quinn Hutson =

American ice hockey player (born 2002)

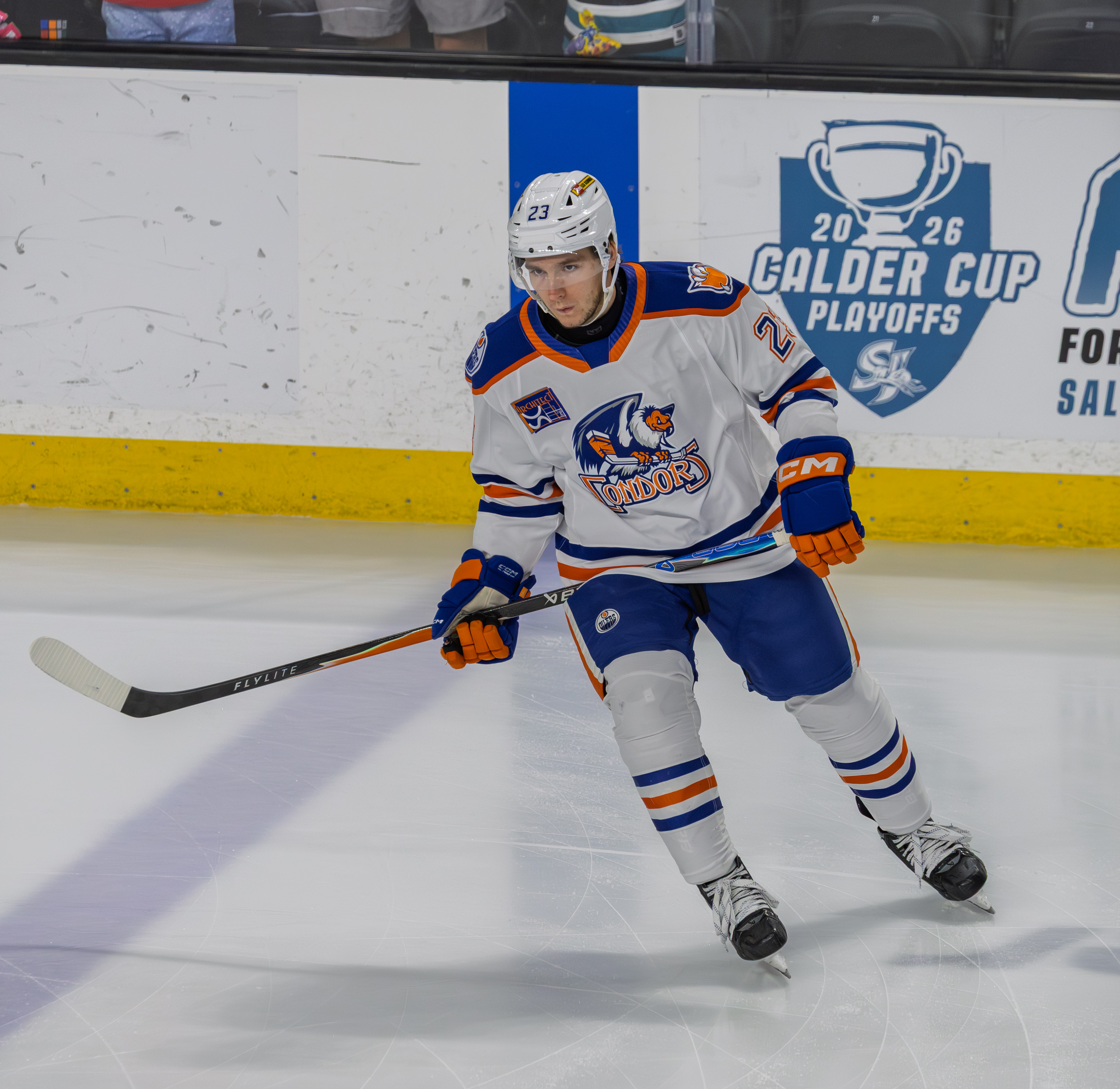
- Hutson with the Bakersfield Condors in 2026
- Born: January 1, 2002 (age 24) North Barrington, Illinois, U.S.
- Height: 5 ft 11 in (180 cm)
- Weight: 179 lb (81 kg; 12 st 11 lb)
- Position: Right wing
- Shoots: Right
- NHL team (P) Cur. team: Edmonton Oilers; Bakersfield Condors (AHL)
- NHL draft: Undrafted
- Playing career: 2025–present

Quinn Hutson (born January 1, 2002) is an American professional ice hockey player for the Bakersfield Condors in the American Hockey League (AHL) while under contract as a prospect to the Edmonton Oilers of the National Hockey League (NHL). He played college ice hockey at Boston University.

== Playing career ==
=== College ===
Hutson began his college ice hockey at Boston University during the 2022–23 season. During his freshman year, he recorded 15 goals and 13 assists in 39 games. During the 2023–24 season, in his sophomore year, he recorded 18 goals and 18 assists in 40 games. During the 2024–25 season, in his junior year, he led the team in scoring and recorded a career-high 23 goals and 27 assists in 38 games. He ranked second in the NCAA in points per game at 1.39, behind only Isaac Howard of Michigan State at 1.41. Following the season he was named to the All-Hockey East Second Team, and New England Division I All-Star team. He finished his collegiate career with 56 goals and 58 assists in 116 games.

=== Professional ===
On April 14, 2025, Hutson signed a two-year, entry-level contract with the Edmonton Oilers, starting during the 2024–25 season. He made his NHL debut later that day, in a 5–0 loss to the Los Angeles Kings.

== Personal life ==
Hutson was born to Rob and Julie Hutson and has three brothers, Lane, Cole and Lars. The former two also played college ice hockey at Boston University. Lane is a defenseman for the Montreal Canadiens of the NHL, while Cole is a defenseman for the Washington Capitals.

== Career statistics ==
			Regular season					Playoffs
Season	Team	League	GP	G	A	Pts	PIM	GP	G	A	Pts	PIM
2020–21	Muskegon Lumberjacks	USHL	46	16	26	42	49	4	0	3	3	0
2021–22	Muskegon Lumberjacks	USHL	59	33	40	73	63	9	7	9	16	8
2022–23	Boston University	HE	39	15	13	28	24	—	—	—	—	—
2023–24	Boston University	HE	40	18	18	36	35	—	—	—	—	—
2024–25	Boston University	HE	38	23	27	50	33	—	—	—	—	—
2024–25	Edmonton Oilers	NHL	2	0	0	0	2	—	—	—	—	—
2025–26	Bakersfield Condors	AHL	67	30	33	63	84	3	3	0	3	8
2025–26	Edmonton Oilers	NHL	4	1	0	1	0	—	—	—	—	—
NHL totals			6	1	0	1	2	—	—	—	—	—

== Awards and honors ==
Award	Year	Ref
College
All-Hockey East Hockey East Second Team	2025	
AHL
All-Rookie Team	2026	
