= 2025–26 ECAC Hockey men's season =

- Season: 2025–26
- Conference: ECAC Hockey
- Division: Division I
- Sport: men's ice hockey
- Duration: October 3, 2025– March 21, 2026
- Number of teams: 12
- TV partner(s): ESPN+

NHL Entry Draft

Regular Season
- Season champions: Quinnipiac
- Season MVP: Hayden Stavroff
- Top scorer: Hayden Stavroff (37)

ECAC Hockey tournament
- Tournament champions: Dartmouth
- Runners-up: Princeton
- Tournament MVP: Emmett Croteau
- Top scorer: Kai Daniells (7); David Jacobs

NCAA tournament
- Bids: 3
- Record: 1–3
- Best Finish: Regional Final
- Team(s): Quinnipiac

The 2025–26 ECAC Hockey men's season was the 65th season of play for ECAC Hockey and took place during the 2025–26 NCAA Division I men's ice hockey season. The season began on October 3, 2025, and the conference tournament concluded on March 21, 2026.

== Coaches ==
- Prior to the previous season, Mike Schafer announced that he would be retiring following the '25 campaign. The school quickly decided to hire Cornell alum Casey Jones as an associate coach with the intent of promoting him to head coach for this season.
- After finishing with a losing record in six of seven season, Rensselaer decided to move on from Dave Smith as head coach. Soon thereafter, the school hired former American International head coach Eric Lang for the position.
- Shortly before the beginning of the academic year, Keith Allain announced his retirement effective immediately. Due to short time constraints, assistant coach Joe Howe was promoted to interim head coach for this year with a national search set to begin following the season.

=== Records ===
Team	Head coach	Season at school	Record at school	ECAC Hockey record
Brown	Brendan Whittet	16	145–275–59	94–190–46
Clarkson	Jean-François Houle	2	24–12–3	15–6–1
Colgate	Mike Harder	3	34–31–7	26–14–4
Cornell	Casey Jones	1	0–0–0	124–96–35
Dartmouth	Reid Cashman	5	43–69–12	30–47–11
Harvard	Ted Donato	21	318–276–75	214–173–64
Princeton	Ben Syer	2	12–15–3	7–12–3
Quinnipiac	Rand Pecknold	31	666–359–107	253–130–54
Rensselaer	Eric Lang	1	0–0–0	0–0–0
St. Lawrence	Brent Brekke	7	61–116–23	38–71–15
Union	Josh Hauge	4	49–51–8	29–35–6
Yale	Joe Howe	1	0–0–0	0–0–0

== Standings ==
2025–26 ECAC Hockey Standings
	Conference record										Overall record					
	GP	W	L	T	OTW	OTL	SW	PTS	GF	GA	GP	W	L	T	GF	GA
#8 Quinnipiac †	22	17	4	1	2	0	0	50	102	48	40	27	10	3	162	95
#10 Dartmouth *	22	13	5	4	0	1	3	47	81	53	35	23	8	4	125	75
#12 Cornell	22	15	6	1	1	1	1	47	71	42	34	22	11	1	109	69
Princeton	22	11	9	2	0	1	1	37	63	57	34	18	13	3	103	90
Union	22	11	9	2	1	1	1	36	71	68	37	22	12	3	140	98
Harvard	22	11	10	1	0	1	0	35	61	64	34	16	16	2	92	100
Colgate	22	9	10	3	2	0	2	30	68	74	37	13	20	4	99	125
Clarkson	22	9	10	3	2	0	1	29	65	65	38	18	17	3	111	111
Rensselaer	22	8	13	1	0	1	0	26	55	70	35	11	23	1	80	115
Yale	22	7	14	1	2	2	0	22	63	80	31	8	22	1	79	115
St. Lawrence	22	6	15	1	0	0	1	20	59	99	35	7	25	3	85	151
Brown	22	4	16	2	0	2	1	17	44	83	31	5	24	2	63	119
Championship: March 21, 2026 † indicates conference regular season champion (Cleary Cup) * indicates conference tournament champion (Whitelaw Cup); Rankings: USCHO.com Top 20 Poll; updated April 15, 2026

== Non-Conference record ==
=== Regular season record ===
Team	AHA	Big Ten	CCHA	Hockey East	Independent	NCHC	Total
Brown	0–2–0	0–0–0	0–0–0	0–3–0	1–1–0	0–0–0	1–6–0
Clarkson	2–2–0	1–1–0	1–1–0	1–0–0	0–1–0	1–1–0	6–6–0
Colgate	1–3–0	0–2–0	0–0–0	2–3–1	0–0–0	0–0–0	3–8–1
Cornell	0–0–0	0–0–0	0–0–0	1–2–0	2–0–0	2–0–0	5–2–0
Dartmouth	1–0–0	0–0–0	0–0–0	2–1–0	1–0–0	1–1–0	5–2–0
Harvard	0–0–0	0–2–0	0–0–0	2–2–1	1–0–0	0–0–0	3–4–1
Princeton	0–1–1	0–0–0	0–2–0	0–0–0	3–0–0	0–0–0	3–3–1
Quinnipiac	3–0–0	1–0–0	0–0–0	4–2–1	1–1–1	0–0–0	9–3–2
Rensselaer	2–0–0	0–0–0	0–2–0	1–4–0	0–0–0	0–2–0	3–8–0
St. Lawrence	0–2–0	0–2–0	0–1–1	1–2–0	0–2–1	0–0–0	1–9–2
Union	5–0–1	0–0–0	0–0–0	2–0–0	2–0–0	0–1–0	9–1–1
Yale	0–1–0	0–0–0	0–1–0	0–2–0	0–0–0	1–2–0	1–6–0
Overall	14–11–2	2–7–0	1–7–1	16–21–3	11–5–2	5–7–0	49–58–8

== Statistics ==
=== Leading scorers ===
GP = Games played; G = Goals; A = Assists; Pts = Points; PIM = Penalty minutes

Player	Class	Team	GP	G	A	Pts	PIM
Hayden Stavroff	Sophomore	Dartmouth	22	22	15	37	22
Ethan Wyttenbach	Freshman	Quinnipiac	22	15	21	36	12
Hank Cleaves	Sophomore	Dartmouth	22	11	18	29	31
Antonin Verreault	Freshman	Quinnipiac	22	12	16	28	10
Jonathan Castagna	Junior	Cornell	22	11	14	25	21
Kai Daniells	Junior	Princeton	22	11	13	24	4
David Jacobs	Senior	Princeton	22	8	16	24	14
Simon Labelle	Senior	Colgate	22	10	13	23	23
Ryan Bottrill	Graduate	Clarkson	22	6	16	22	10
Tyler Cristall	Senior	St. Lawrence	22	7	14	21	4

=== Leading goaltenders ===
Minimum 1/3 of team's minutes played in conference games.
GP = Games played; Min = Minutes played; W = Wins; L = Losses; T = Ties; GA = Goals against; SO = Shutouts; SV% = Save percentage; GAA = Goals against average

Player	Class	Team	GP	Min	W	L	T	GA	SO	SV%	GAA
Dylan Silverstein	Sophomore	Quinnipiac	10	552:30	6	2	1	18	1	.916	1.95
Alexis Cournoyer	Freshman	Cornell	19	1102:33	13	6	0	37	0	.919	2.01
Matej Marinov	Junior	Quinnipiac	13	761:56	11	2	0	27	1	.906	2.13
Emmett Croteau	Junior	Dartmouth	15	914:10	8	3	4	36	0	.904	2.36
Brayden Gillespie	Freshman	Union	11	575:06	5	3	0	23	2	.914	2.40

== ECAC tournament ==
Teams are reseeded for the quarterfinal and semifinal rounds

First Round; March 6–7
5	Union	9
12	Brown	0
6	Harvard	4*
11	St. Lawrence	3
7	Colgate	3
10	Yale	2
8	Clarkson	2
9	Rensselaer	1

Quarterfinals; March 13–15
1	Quinnipiac	0	3	-
8	Clarkson	3	4	-
2	Dartmouth	4	4	-
7	Colgate	1	1	-
3	Cornell	1	4	5
6	Harvard	3	0	2
4	Princeton	5	5	-
5	Union	2	2	-

Semifinals; March 20
2	Dartmouth	4
8	Clarkson	0
3	Cornell	2
4	Princeton	3

Championship; March 21
2	Dartmouth	2*
4	Princeton	1

Note: * denotes overtime period(s)

== NCAA tournament ==
=== Regional semifinals ===
March 26, 2026; 5:00 pm on ESPN+	(2) Providence	2–5 (0–0, 0–3, 2–2)	(3) Quinnipiac	Denny Sanford Premier Center; Attendance: 5,114

Game reference

Jack Parsons
Goalies
Dylan Silverstein
Referees:
Andrew Bruggeman
Sean Fernandez
Linesmen:
Sam Shikowsky
Tommy George

	0–1	25:55 – Elliott Groenewold (7) (Vidicek, Marcellus)
	0–2	34:38 – Chris Pelosi (18) (Verreault, Czerneckianair)
	0–3	38:05 – GW – Antonin Verreault (16) (Borgula, Czerneckianair)
(Adams) Logan Sawyer (14) – 50:12	1–3
(Masa, Sawyer) John Mustard (17) – 54:02	2–3
	2–4	58:46 – EN – Ethan Wyttenbach (25) (Blace)
	2–5	59:25 – EN – Graham Sward (5) (unassisted)

23 min
Penalties
10 min
25
Shots
38

Game summary

March 26, 2026; 5:20 pm on ESPNU	(2) Dartmouth	1–5 (1–1, 0–0, 0–4)	(3) Wisconsin	DCU Center; Attendance: 4,018

Game reference

Emmett Croteau
Goalies
Daniel Hauser
Referees:
Brandon Schmitt
Nick Krebsbach
Linesmen:
Chris Williams
Kyle Stephens

	0–1	2:52 – PP – Simon Tassy (12) (Finley, Dexheimer)
(Grable, MacDonald) Hank Cleaves (18) – 10:05	1–1
	1–2	49:47 – GW – Jack Horbach (3) (Zelenov, Phelan)
	1–3	54:17 – Simon Tassy (13) (Botterill, Tulk)
	1–4	56:18 – EN – Christian Fitzgerald (16) (Finley)
	1–5	57:53 – EN – Quinn Finley (16) (unassisted)

4 min
Penalties
6 min
14
Shots
28

Game summary
The game began with Dartmouth getting the first rush up the ice but the Wisconsin defense was able to prevent a good shot on goal. The Badgers then began to take control and establish some offensive zone time. Just past the 2-minute mark, Joe Palodichuk put a solid shot on goal but Emmett Croteau made the save. A few seconds later, Dartmouth was called for too-many men and gave Wisconsin the first power play of the night. Off of the faceoff, Quinn Finley put a hard shot on goal that Croteau snatched with his glove. Wisconsin won the next faceoff as well and after passing the puck around the outside, put it to the front of the net. Finley's pass to Simon Tassy was partially deflected by Eric Charpentier and forced Croteau to make a desperation save with his toe. However, the netminder could not control the rebound and Tassy poked the puck beneath his leg for the opening tally. Wisconsin continued to pressure after scoring and forced several turnovers at center ice. The Big Green were eventually able to even out play and force an offensive zone faceoff but Wisconsin, who had an early edge in the dot, was swiftly able to work the puck up the ice. After the 5-minute mark, Finley nearly doubled his team's lead when he hit the crossbar from the high slot. When the game was paused for its first TV timeout around the 7-minute mark, Wisconsin was in complete control of the match and had credit for all 6 shots to that point. After the ensuing faceoff, Dartmouth finally got the puck on goal and nearly scored on a follow up attempt when Cam MacDonald's one-timer hit the post instead of a wide-open net. After turning over the puck in their own zone, Dartmouth got on an odd-man rush just after the midway point of the period and Hank Cleaves threw a shot against the grain to tie the score. Both teams probed for their chances afterwards but were unable to get a good look on goal for the next several minutes. Dartmouth appeared to have trouble staying on its skates as several players fell to the ice without any help from a Badger. Wisconsin was finally able to get some time in the Dartmouth end after an icing but even then, the Big Green defense was able to hold them to the outside. At the 15-minute mark, it was Wisconsin's turn to take an administrative penalty when Vasily Zelenov was called for a faceoff violation. On the ensuing power play, Dartmouth turned the puck over in its own end and gave a tremendous chance to Finley but Croteau stopped the shot with his blocker. After killing off the penalty, Wisconsin was able to force Dartmouth into another turnover in the Big Green's end but they could not get a good shot on goal. With less than 100 seconds to play, the Badgers' attack put the puck on goal and nearly got a lucky bounce past Croteau but the goaltender managed to get a whistle while sitting on the ice. The defenses held firm over the final moments and allowed the period to end with the score still tied.

The second began much in the way the first ended with both teams looking for their opportunities. About a minute in, Brock Cummings was charging at a loose puck near the Wisconsin cage when Palodichuk hooked him and the Big Green received its second power play of the match. Dartmouth were far better with their second man-advantage and were able to move the puck to Jack Silverberg in the slot but the puck fluttered into Daniel Hauser's belly. Wisconsin got an odd-man rush afterwards but Jack Phelan's shot went wide. Shortly after the penalty was over, Tassy got a open shot off of the rush from the right circle but Croteau's trapper captured the puck. Wisconsin continued to pressure and get looks at the Dartmouth cage but the Big Green defense did not break and several attempts were either blocked or deflected away. Wisconsin hit its second crossbar of the night when a crazy bounce from behind the goal jumped right on Grady Deering's tape but his rushed shot missed an open cage. After a TV timeout, Dartmouth upped their forecheck and were able to get a few good looks on goal. On the ensuing counterattack from the Badgers, Luke Osburn hit the post over Croteau's left shoulder for another near-miss. Moments later, Nathan Morin intercepted a blind pass behind the Wisconsin goal and was almost able to slip a wraparound through Hauser's legs but the score remained unchanged. After a faceoff shortly afterwards, Christian Fitzgerald chipped the puck into the Dartmouth end before being checked by Colin Grable. The referee ruled that the puck had been gone long enough and whistled Grable for an interference penalty. Wisconsin got several chances to score on its power play but they were unable to convert. About halfway through the man-advantage, Hauser nearly turned the puck over behind his own cage but the Badgers were able to retain possession and clear the puck out of their zone. Almost immediately after the penalty expired, a poor change resulted in a too-many men penalty for Wisconsin and Dartmouth got its turn on the power play. Despite keeping the puck in the Wisconsin end for the majority of the time they didn't get a single shot on goal. After killing off the penalty, Wisconsin went on the attack and Tassy got another wide-open chance on goal thanks to a turnover. This time, he tried to slide the puck between Croteau's legs but the Big Green goalie kept his stick on the ice and pushed the puck away. Wisconsin's final chance came as the period was expiring but another block from the Dartmouth defense prevented the puck from getting on goal. By this point the Dartmouth offense was mostly ineffectual with just 8 shots on goal, however, Wisconsin was only able to muster 17 of their own after 40 minutes.

Dartmouth jumped out to a fast start in the third and nearly got an open look at the net but a cross-crease pass went wide. A moment later, Hayden Stavroff broke in on the Wisconsin cage but Aiden Dubinsky was able to wrestle him down. Dubinsky was somehow able to escape without a penalty but the pair did end up crashing into Hauser, causing the goalie to need a moment before continuing. The two sides then exchanged attacks but both had trouble locating the net with their shots. At the 5-minute mark, Tassy got a pass from behind the net and had a clean look at the Dartmouth cage; however, Croteau came out to challenge the deflected the shot over the net. A minute later, a shot in close by Deering was absorbed by Croteau and kept Dartmouth in the game despite the wide disparity in shots. Near the middle of the period, Alex Krause was able to turn the puck over inside the Wisconsin blueline. He was able to get a good bounce off of the end boards to the far side of the net but Dartmouth failed to get a shot on goal. On the ensuing rush up the ice, Zelenov was able to find a wide-open Jack Horbach down low and the senior backhanded the puck under Croteau's blocker for Wisconsin's second lead of the game. With the Big Green now behind, they could no longer sit back and wait for their chances. Dartmouth tried to turn up the pressure but Wisconsin was not accommodating and continued to attack the Badger net. With under six minutes to play, Ryan Botterill threw a puck on goal and the shot was deflected in by Tassy. Wisconsin kept Dartmouth at bay for the next couple of minutes until they iced the puck with about 4 minutes to play. In order to give his team a rest, Mike Hastings called a timeout and Reid Cashman responded by pulling his goaltender. Just 20 seconds later, Fitzgerald was able to beat Stavroff to a loose puck in the Big Green's end and he deposited the puck into the empty net. With nothing to lose, Dartmouth pulled Croteau again and all that did was allow Finley to add another tally to the Badgers' total. The final two minutes passed without much fanfare as both sides understood that the match had already been decided and Wisconsin was able to skate away with the victory.

March 27, 2026; 6:00 pm on ESPN+	(2) Denver	5–0 (2–0, 1–0, 2–0)	(3) Cornell	Blue Arena; Attendance: 4,217

Game reference

Johnny Hicks
Goalies
Alexis Cournoyer
Referees:
Christopher Leavitt
Brendan Blanchard
Linesmen:
Patrick Philbin
Conner Foley

(Ashcroft, Burrows) Jake Fisher (8) – GW – 6:08	1–0
(Jamieson) Kieran Cebrian (5) – 15:33	2–0
(Caswell) Sam Harris (14) – 35:31	3–0
(Ashcroft, Harris) Clarke Caswell (7) – 45:06	4–0
(Reeder) Rieger Lorenz (16) – EN – 56:12	5–0

2 min
Penalties
4 min
30
Shots
24

Game summary

=== Regional finals ===
March 28, 2026; 7:00 pm on ESPN2	(1) North Dakota	5–0 (3–0, 2–0, 0–0)	(3) Quinnipiac	Denny Sanford Premier Center; Attendance: 6,209

Game reference

Jan Špunar
Goalies
Dylan Silverstein
Matej Marinov
Referees:
Andrew Bruggeman
Sean Fernandez
Linesmen:
Sam Shikowsky
Tommy George

(Zellers) Jack Kernan (10) – GW – 6:02	1–0
(Young, Wiebe) Cody Croal (10) – 8:14	2–0
(Wiebe) Jack Kernan (11) – 12:20	3–0
(Zellers, Rickwood) Dylan James (21) – 24:08	4–0
(Strinden, Swanson) Cole Reschny (6) – 31:31	5–0

6 min
Penalties
8 min
29
Shots
22

Game summary

== Ranking ==
=== USCHO ===
Team	Pre	1	2	3	4	5	6	7	8	9	10	11	13	14	15	16	17	18	19	20	21	22	23	24	25	Final
Brown	NR	NR	NR	NR	NR	NR	NR	NR	NR	NR	NR	NR	NR	NR	NR	NR	NR	NR	NR	NR	NR	NR	NR	NR	NR	NR
Clarkson	NR	NR	NR	NR	NR	NR	NR	NR	NR	NR	NR	NR	NR	NR	NR	NR	NR	NR	NR	NR	NR	NR	NR	NR	NR	NR
Colgate	NR	NR	NR	NR	NR	NR	NR	NR	NR	NR	NR	NR	NR	NR	NR	NR	NR	NR	NR	NR	NR	NR	NR	NR	NR	NR
Cornell	17	17	18	19	20	17	20	19	17	17	17	17	17	14	13	12	10	9	9	11	11	9	9	8	9	12
Dartmouth	NR	NR	NR	NR	NR	NR	19	13	13	10	8	8	9	11	10	10	14	14	12	14	14	12	12	9	8	10
Harvard	NR	NR	NR	NR	NR	NR	NR	NR	NR	NR	18	18	18	NR	NR	NR	NR	NR	NR	NR	NR	NR	NR	NR	NR	NR
Princeton	NR	NR	NR	NR	NR	NR	NR	NR	NR	NR	NR	NR	NR	20	18	NR	NR	NR	NR	NR	NR	NR	NR	NR	NR	NR
Quinnipiac	13	8	10	6	7	5	10	9	8	8	10	10	10	8	7	6	6	5	5	5	7	8	7	10	11	8
Rensselaer	NR	NR	NR	NR	NR	NR	NR	NR	NR	NR	NR	NR	NR	NR	NR	NR	NR	NR	NR	NR	NR	NR	NR	NR	NR	NR
St. Lawrence	NR	NR	NR	NR	NR	NR	NR	NR	NR	NR	NR	NR	NR	NR	NR	NR	NR	NR	NR	NR	NR	NR	NR	NR	NR	NR
Union	NR	NR	NR	NR	NR	NR	NR	20	20	NR	NR	20	20	NR	NR	NR	NR	NR	NR	NR	NR	NR	NR	NR	NR	NR
Yale	NR	NR	NR	NR	NR	NR	NR	NR	NR	NR	NR	NR	NR	NR	NR	NR	NR	NR	NR	NR	NR	NR	NR	NR	NR	NR

Note: USCHO did not release a poll in week 12 or 26.

=== USA Hockey ===
Team	Pre	1	2	3	4	5	6	7	8	9	10	11	13	14	15	16	17	18	19	20	21	22	23	24	25	26	Final
Brown	NR	NR	NR	NR	NR	NR	NR	NR	NR	NR	NR	NR	NR	NR	NR	NR	NR	NR	NR	NR	NR	NR	NR	NR	NR	NR	NR
Clarkson	20	NR	NR	NR	NR	NR	NR	NR	NR	NR	NR	NR	NR	NR	NR	NR	NR	NR	NR	NR	NR	NR	NR	NR	NR	NR	NR
Colgate	NR	NR	NR	NR	NR	NR	NR	NR	NR	NR	NR	NR	NR	NR	NR	NR	NR	NR	NR	NR	NR	NR	NR	NR	NR	NR	NR
Cornell	16	16	18	18	20	16	19	17	16	16	15	16	17	12	12	12	10	8	10	10	10	9	9	8	11	12	12
Dartmouth	NR	NR	NR	NR	NR	NR	20	13	10	10	7	7	8	10	9	10	13	14	13	12	12	12	12	9	8	10	10
Harvard	NR	NR	NR	NR	NR	NR	NR	NR	18	20	16	18	16	20	NR	NR	NR	NR	NR	NR	NR	NR	NR	NR	NR	NR	NR
Princeton	NR	NR	NR	NR	NR	NR	NR	NR	NR	NR	NR	NR	NR	19	18	NR	NR	NR	NR	NR	NR	NR	NR	20	NR	NR	NR
Quinnipiac	13	9	10	6	6	5	9	9	8	8	10	10	10	8	7	7	6	5	5	5	7	8	7	10	10	8	8
Rensselaer	NR	NR	NR	NR	NR	NR	NR	NR	NR	NR	NR	NR	NR	NR	NR	NR	NR	NR	NR	NR	NR	NR	NR	NR	NR	NR	NR
St. Lawrence	NR	NR	NR	NR	NR	NR	NR	NR	NR	NR	NR	NR	NR	NR	NR	NR	NR	NR	NR	NR	NR	NR	NR	NR	NR	NR	NR
Union	NR	NR	NR	NR	NR	NR	NR	20	NR	NR	NR	NR	NR	NR	NR	NR	NR	NR	NR	NR	20	20	20	NR	NR	NR	NR
Yale	NR	NR	NR	NR	NR	NR	NR	NR	NR	NR	NR	NR	NR	NR	NR	NR	NR	NR	NR	NR	NR	NR	NR	NR	NR	NR	NR

Note: USA Hockey did not release a poll in week 12.

=== NPI ===
Team	1	2	3	4	5	6	7	8	9	10	11	13	14	15	16	17	18	19	20	21	22	23	24	Final
Brown	–	–	–	–	–	47	57	46	53	56	55	55	56	57	57	57	58	58	59	59	59	59	59	59
Clarkson	–	–	45	–	–	38	43	50	48	42	42	35	28	29	40	42	44	44	42	42	40	39	34	34
Colgate	–	–	36	–	–	49	46	45	47	51	48	47	49	47	45	46	45	48	48	48	49	46	50	50
Cornell	–	–	–	–	–	9	4	3	12	14	14	11	9	11	9	7	8	10	10	10	9	9	9	12
Dartmouth	–	–	–	–	–	1	1	1	1	1	2	6	7	8	12	10	7	11	11	11	11	10	8	8
Harvard	–	–	–	–	–	27	12	8	15	10	9	17	20	20	19	21	25	23	31	31	33	31	32	33
Princeton	–	–	–	–	–	20	29	15	32	18	19	12	15	25	29	31	28	32	27	27	28	30	23	21
Quinnipiac	–	–	11	–	–	21	21	14	13	15	13	10	10	9	8	9	9	6	7	8	7	7	11	10
Rensselaer	–	–	55	–	–	58	59	59	56	58	57	56	55	55	55	56	56	55	54	54	54	54	54	54
St. Lawrence	–	–	53	–	–	60	60	60	61	62	62	62	62	63	62	62	62	62	60	60	60	61	61	61
Union	–	–	8	–	–	42	35	39	35	34	29	27	21	32	34	33	31	25	20	21	21	21	26	26
Yale	–	–	–	–	–	13	36	30	42	46	51	52	53	52	52	54	54	54	56	57	57	58	58	58

Note: teams ranked in the top-10 automatically qualify for the NCAA tournament. Teams ranked 11-16 can qualify based upon conference tournament results.

== Awards ==
=== NCAA ===
Award	Recipient
Spencer Penrose Award	Reid Cashman, Dartmouth
Tim Taylor Award	Ethan Wyttenbach, Quinnipiac
Derek Hines Unsung Hero Award	Kevin Anderson, Princeton
AHCA All-American Teams
East First Team	Position
Hayden Stavroff, Dartmouth	F
Ethan Wyttenbach, Quinnipiac	F
East Second Team	Position
Tyler Dunbar, Union	D

=== ECAC Hockey ===
Award		Recipient
Player of the Year		Hayden Stavroff, Dartmouth
Best Defensive Forward		Jonathan Castagna, Cornell
Best Defensive Defenseman		Elliott Groenewold, Quinnipiac
Rookie of the Year		Ethan Wyttenbach, Quinnipiac
Ken Dryden Award		Alexis Cournoyer, Cornell
Student-Athlete of the Year		David Chen, Yale
Wayne Dean Sportsmanship Award		
Tim Taylor Award		Reid Cashman, Dartmouth
Most Outstanding Player in Tournament		Emmett Croteau, Dartmouth
All-ECAC Hockey Teams
First Team	Position	Second Team
Alexis Cournoyer, Cornell	G	Emmett Croteau, Dartmouth
Elliott Groenewold, Quinnipiac	D	Xavier Veilleux, Cornell
Tyler Dunbar, Union	D	Isaiah Norlin, Colgate
Jonathan Castagna, Cornell	F	Antonin Verreault, Quinnipiac
Ethan Wyttenbach, Quinnipiac	F	Brandon Buhr, Union
Hayden Stavroff, Dartmouth	F	Hank Cleaves, Dartmouth
Third Team	Position	Rookie Team
Arthur Smith, Princeton	G	Alexis Cournoyer, Cornell
C. J. Foley, Dartmouth	D	Thomas Klassek, Rensselaer
Matthew Morden, Harvard	D	Xavier Veilleux, Cornell
Kai Daniells, Princeton	F	Ethan Wyttenbach, Quinnipiac
Mason Marcellus, Quinnipiac	F	Antonin Verreault, Quinnipiac
Ryan Bottrill, Clarkson	F	Rasmus Svartstrom, St. Lawrence
