= 2024–25 Dartmouth Big Green men's ice hockey season =

- Conference: 5th ECAC Hockey
- Home ice: Thompson Arena

Rankings
- USCHO: NR
- USA Hockey: NR

Record
- Overall: 18–13–2
- Conference: 12–9–1
- Home: 7–7–2
- Road: 11–5–0
- Neutral: 0–1–0

Coaches and captains
- Head coach: Reid Cashman
- Assistant coaches: Jason Tapp; Brian Fahey; Byron Pool
- Captain(s): Sean Chisholm; Steven Townley

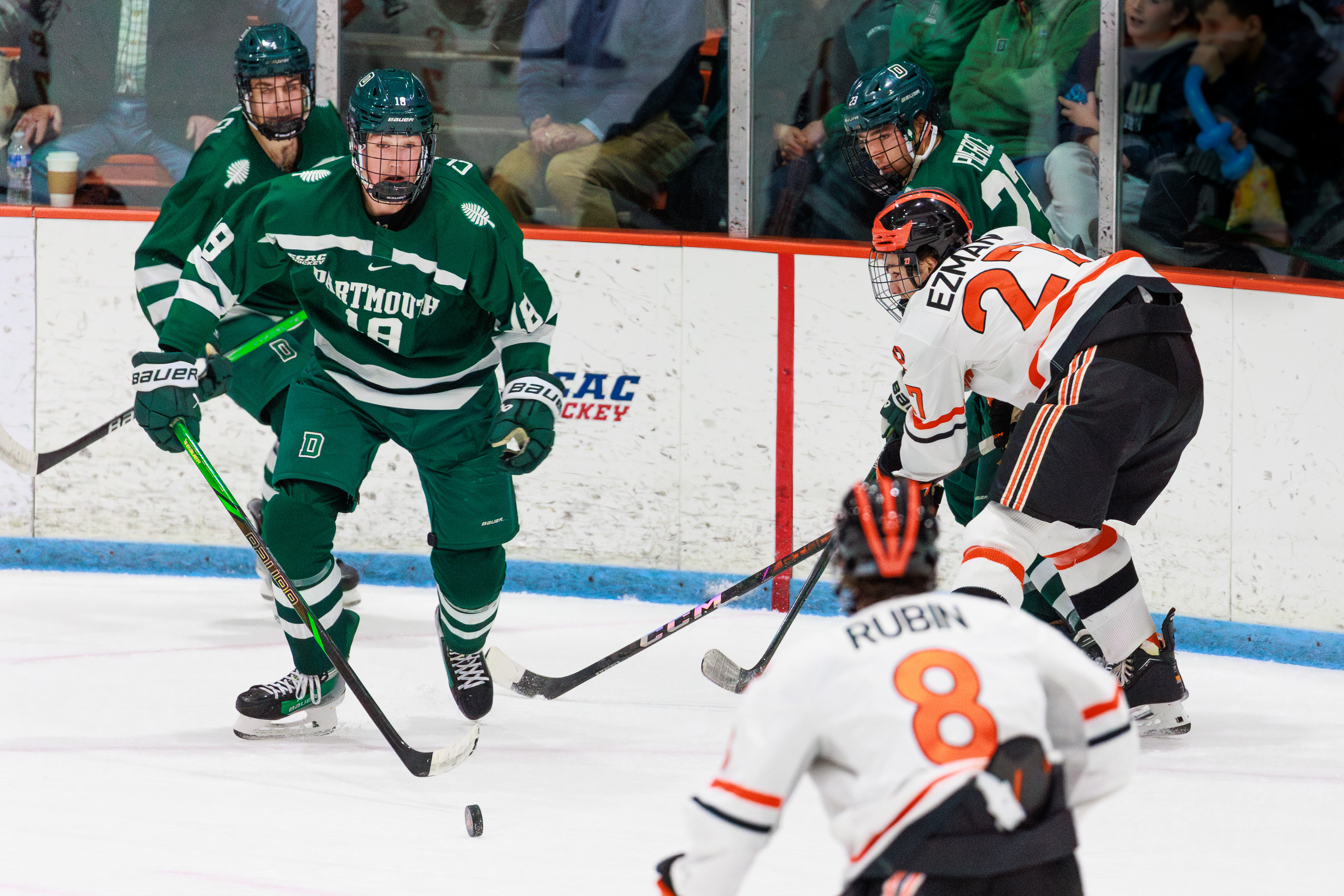
The Green beat Princeton, 5–1.

The 2024–25 Dartmouth Big Green Men's ice hockey season was the 118th season of play for the program and the 63rd in ECAC Hockey. The Big Green represented Dartmouth College, played their home games at the Thompson Arena and were coached by Reid Cashman in his 4th season.

== Season ==
Coming into the season with high expectations, Dartmouth began the season already dealing with injuries with their reigning top scorer, Luke Haymes, on the shelf with a broken hand. Despite his absence, the Big Green seemed to have no trouble finding the back of the net, averaging 4 goals per game through the first three weeks of the season. On top of that, solid goaltending from both Roan Clarke and Emmett Croteau had the team undefeated through 6 games with wins over nationally-ranked Quinnipiac and Cornell. After suffering their first loss to championship-favorite Boston College, Dartmouth had risen up to the top 15 in the polls and sat 4th in the PairWise rankings, leaving the program with a tremendous opportunity to end its 45-year NCAA tournament drought.

After dropping three very close games (one in a shootout) to finish off the first half of its schedule, Dartmouth's ranking slipped but the team was still well positioned to reach the tournament. With Haymes returning after Christmas, the Big Green were looking to make a splash at the Ledyard Bank Classic but they were let down by their goaltenders. Clarke and Croteau combined to allow 8 goals on 51 shots and Dartmouth was unable to take advantage of leads early in the two games. As the second half of their season progressed, the Big Green continued to find themselves in close games but the offense was too inconsistent to keep their playoff hopes alive. Over a 14-game stretch Dartmouth played ten 1-goal matches (excluding empty-net goals), going 3–7 in those contests. During their terrible run, Croteau ended up becoming the primary starter but it was the lack of scoring that was chiefly to blame for the losses. By late February the team had fallen down to .500 and had virtually no chance to make the tournament short of a conference championship.

The team recovered a bit at the very end of the season, with Croteau backstopping them to a 3-game winning streak as the conference tournament began. After a relatively easy victory over St. Lawrence in the first round, the defense came up big in the first game with Union. After twice getting behind by a goal, the Big Green raised their level of play, holding the Chargers to just 10 shots over the final 40 minutes. The offense was the story in the rematch with Dartmouth exploding for 7 goals with contributions from up and down the lineup. The minor upset sent the team to the semifinals where Clarke was getting his first start in over a month. Perhaps due to inaction, the netminder was not up to the task and allowed 3 goals on just 14 shots. Dartmouth's offense did him no favors, scoring their only goal with less than 5 minutes left in regulation and the Big Green's season was over. Even with the mildly disappointing finish, Dartmouth still was able to produce its best season in over a decade and made consecutive semifinal appearances for the first time since 1980.

== Departures ==
Player	Position	Nationality	Cause
Cooper Black	Goaltender	United States	Signed professional contract (Florida Panthers)
Brady MacDonald	Defenseman	Canada	Left program (retired)
Joey Musa	Forward	United States	Transferred to Massachusetts
Ryan Sorkin	Forward	United States	Left program (retired)
Josh Waters	Forward	United States	Graduation (retired)

== Recruiting ==
Player	Position	Nationality	Age	Notes
Tim Busconi	Defenseman	United States	20	Milton, MA
Hank Cleaves	Forward	United States	20	Riverside, CT
Emmett Croteau	Goaltender	Canada	20	Bonnyville, AB; transfer from Clarkson; selected 162nd overall in 2022
Colin Grable	Defenseman	United States	21	Spring Lake, NJ
Austin Salani	Forward	United States	21	Hancock, MI
Joshua Schenk	Forward	Canada	20	Whitehorse, YT
Jack Silverberg	Forward	Canada	19	Sherwood Park, AB
Hayden Stavroff	Forward	United States	20	Dublin, OH

== Roster ==
As of August 18, 2024.

No.	Nat.	Player	Class	Pos	Height	Weight	DoB	Hometown	Previous team	NHL rights
2	(United States)	Eric Charpentier	Sophomore	D	6' 3" (1.91 m)	205 lb (93 kg)	2002-06-10	Silver Spring, Maryland	New Jersey Titans (NAHL)	—
3	(United States)	John Fusco	Senior	D	5' 10" (1.78 m)	190 lb (86 kg)	2001-06-13	Westwood, Massachusetts	Harvard (ECAC)	TOR, 189th overall 2020
4	(United States)	C. J. Foley	Sophomore	D	5' 11" (1.8 m)	174 lb (79 kg)	2004-02-11	Hanover, Massachusetts	Salmon Arm Silverbacks (BCHL)	—
5	(Canada)	Tucker McRae	Junior	D	6' 0" (1.83 m)	190 lb (86 kg)	2001-04-11	Calgary, Alberta	Okotoks Oilers (AJHL)	—
6	(United States)	Matt Fusco	Sophomore	D	5' 11" (1.8 m)	195 lb (88 kg)	2003-03-07	Westwood, Massachusetts	West Kelowna Warriors (BCHL)	—
7	(Russia)	Nikita Nikora	Sophomore	F	5' 10" (1.78 m)	170 lb (77 kg)	2004-01-21	St. Petersburg, Russia	Springfield Jr. Blues (NAHL)	—
8	(United States)	Austin Salani	Freshman	F	6' 2" (1.88 m)	194 lb (88 kg)	2003-08-07	Hancock, Michigan	Austin Bruins (NAHL)	—
9	(United States)	Colin Grable	Freshman	D	6' 1" (1.85 m)	190 lb (86 kg)	2003-01-16	Spring Lake, New Jersey	Cedar Rapids RoughRiders (USHL)	—
10	(United States)	Hayden Stavroff	Freshman	F	5' 11" (1.8 m)	190 lb (86 kg)	2004-07-09	Dublin, Ohio	Alberni Valley Bulldogs (BCHL)	—
12	(United States)	Tim Busconi	Freshman	D	6' 0" (1.83 m)	154 lb (70 kg)	2004-01-03	Milton, Massachusetts	Victoria Grizzlies (BCHL)	—
13	(Canada)	Joshua Schenk	Freshman	F	6' 0" (1.83 m)	163 lb (74 kg)	2004-09-04	Whitehorse, Yukon Territory	Trail Smoke Eaters (BCHL)	—
14	(United States)	Steven Townley (C)	Senior	F	6' 2" (1.88 m)	205 lb (93 kg)	2000-06-13	Woodstock, Vermont	Jersey Hitmen (NCDC)	—
15	(Canada)	Cam MacDonald	Junior	F	5' 9" (1.75 m)	185 lb (84 kg)	2002-03-08	Surrey, British Columbia	Vernon Vipers (BCHL)	—
17	(United States)	Braiden Dorfman	Senior	F	6' 1" (1.85 m)	185 lb (84 kg)	2000-08-09	Nashville, Tennessee	Shreveport Mudbugs (NAHL)	—
18	(United States)	Hank Cleaves	Freshman	F	6' 4" (1.93 m)	201 lb (91 kg)	2003-12-25	Riverside, Connecticut	Vernon Vipers (NAHL)	—
19	(Canada)	Sean Chisholm (C)	Senior	F	6' 1" (1.85 m)	190 lb (86 kg)	2001-01-26	Caledonia, Ontario	Brooks Bandits (AJHL)	—
20	(United States)	Cooper Flinton	Junior	F	6' 2" (1.88 m)	205 lb (93 kg)	2003-08-16	Auburn, New Hampshire	Cedar Rapids RoughRiders (USHL)	TBL, 211th overall 2021
22	(Norway)	Trym Løkkeberg	Senior	F	6' 2" (1.88 m)	210 lb (95 kg)	2001-07-23	Fredrikstad, Norway	Mora J20 (J20 Nationell)	—
23	(United States)	Ian Pierce	Senior	D	5' 10" (1.78 m)	190 lb (86 kg)	2001-01-24	Edgewater, New Jersey	Dubuque Fighting Saints (USHL)	—
24	(Finland)	Oskari Vuorio	Sophomore	F	5' 9" (1.75 m)	175 lb (79 kg)	2004-05-06	Espoo, Finland	Jokerit U20 (U20 SM-sarja)	—
28	(Canada)	Luke Haymes	Junior	F	6' 1" (1.85 m)	192 lb (87 kg)	2003-07-28	Ottawa, Ontario	Cowichan Valley Capitals (BCHL)	—
31	(United States)	Mikey Roberts	Sophomore	G	6' 0" (1.83 m)	175 lb (79 kg)	2002-12-25	Wilton, Connecticut	Taft School (USHS–CT)	—
32	(Canada)	Roan Clarke	Sophomore	G	6' 3" (1.91 m)	190 lb (86 kg)	2003-08-23	Cloverdale, British Columbia	Vernon Vipers (BCHL)	—
43	(Canada)	Owen Desilets	Sophomore	D	6' 1" (1.85 m)	175 lb (79 kg)	2004-02-03	Airdrie, Alberta	Alberni Valley Bulldogs (BCHL)	—
68	(Canada)	Nate Morgan	Senior	F	5' 10" (1.78 m)	190 lb (86 kg)	2002-02-08	Calgary, Alberta	Salmon Arm Silverbacks (BCHL)	—
70	(Canada)	Emmett Croteau	Sophomore	G	6' 4" (1.93 m)	209 lb (95 kg)	2003-12-07	Bonnyville, Alberta	Clarkson (ECAC)	MTL, 162nd overall 2022
86	(Canada)	Jack Silverberg	Freshman	F	5' 9" (1.75 m)	201 lb (91 kg)	2004-12-01	Sherwood Park, Alberta	Okotoks Oilers (BCHL)	—
95	(United States)	Alex Krause	Junior	F	6' 1" (1.85 m)	190 lb (86 kg)	2001-07-22	Calabasas, California	Northeast Generals (NAHL)	—

== Standings ==
2024–25 ECAC Hockey Standings
	Conference record										Overall record					
	GP	W	L	T	OTW	OTL	SW	PTS	GF	GA	GP	W	L	T	GF	GA
#15 Quinnipiac †	22	16	5	1	2	3	0	50	79	42	38	24	12	2	135	83
#20 Clarkson	22	15	6	1	2	1	0	45	74	47	39	24	12	3	121	87
Colgate	22	13	7	2	2	2	1	42	80	65	36	18	15	3	114	116
Union	22	12	8	2	0	0	2	40	67	61	36	19	14	3	112	109
Dartmouth	22	12	9	1	0	2	0	39	70	52	33	18	13	2	110	84
#12 Cornell *	22	10	8	4	1	0	3	36	69	53	36	19	11	6	112	82
Harvard	22	9	10	3	2	2	1	31	56	56	33	13	17	3	85	97
Brown	22	9	11	2	3	0	2	28	53	63	32	14	15	3	79	85
Princeton	22	7	12	3	2	2	1	25	55	73	30	12	15	3	71	86
Rensselaer	22	7	15	0	0	2	0	23	57	82	35	12	21	2	101	131
Yale	22	5	14	3	1	1	1	19	52	80	30	6	21	3	67	121
St. Lawrence	22	5	15	2	1	1	1	18	43	81	35	9	24	2	71	121
Championship: March 22, 2025 † indicates conference regular season champion (Cleary Cup) * indicates conference tournament champion (Whitelaw Cup); Rankings: USCHO.com Top 20 Poll

== Schedule and results ==
Date	Time	Opponent^{#}	Rank^{#}	Site	TV	Decision	Result	Attendance	Record
Regular Season
November 1	7:00 p.m.	at Harvard		Bright-Landry Hockey Center • Boston, Massachusetts	ESPN+	Clarke	W 2–1	2,054	1–0–0 (1–0–0)
November 3	3:00 p.m.	Stonehill*		Thompson Arena • Hanover, New Hampshire	ESPN+	Croteau	W 5–2	1,637	2–0–0
November 8	7:00 p.m.	at #15 Quinnipiac		M&T Bank Arena • Hamden, Connecticut	ESPN+	Clarke	W 4–2	3,121	3–0–0 (2–0–0)
November 9	7:00 p.m.	at Princeton		Hobey Baker Memorial Rink • Princeton, New Jersey	ESPN+	Croteau	W 5–1	1,426	4–0–0 (3–0–0)
November 15	7:00 p.m.	#5 Cornell	#17	Thompson Arena • Hanover, New Hampshire	ESPN+	Clarke	W 4–3	2,801	5–0–0 (4–0–0)
November 16	7:00 p.m.	Colgate	#17	Thompson Arena • Hanover, New Hampshire	ESPN+	Clarke	T 4–4 ^{SOL}	2,381	5–0–1 (4–0–1)
November 29	7:00 p.m.	at #4 Boston College*	#15	Conte Forum • Chestnut Hill, Massachusetts	ESPN+	Clarke	L 3–5	7,395	5–1–1
December 1	4:00 p.m.	at Vermont*	#15	Gutterson Fieldhouse • Burlington, Vermont	ESPN+	Croteau	W 3–1	2,247	6–1–1
December 6	7:00 p.m.	St. Lawrence	#13	Thompson Arena • Hanover, New Hampshire	ESPN+	Clarke	L 2–3	2,018	6–2–1 (4–1–1)
December 7	7:00 p.m.	#20 Clarkson	#13	Thompson Arena • Hanover, New Hampshire	ESPN+	Croteau	L 2–3	1,874	6–3–1 (4–2–1)
December 13	7:00 p.m.	New Hampshire*	#17	Thompson Arena • Hanover, New Hampshire (Rivalry)	ESPN+	Clarke	T 3–3 ^{SOL}	2,768	6–3–2
Ledyard Bank Classic
December 28	7:30 p.m.	Alaska Anchorage*	#17	Thompson Arena • Hanover, New Hampshire (Ledyard Bank Semifinal)	ESPN+	Clarke	W 5–4	3,582	7–3–2
December 29	7:30 p.m.	#7 Providence*	#17	Thompson Arena • Hanover, New Hampshire (Ledyard Bank Championship)	ESPN+	Clarke	L 3–5	3,031	7–4–2
January 5	4:00 p.m.	at Merrimack*	#17	J. Thom Lawler Rink • North Andover, Massachusetts	ESPN+	Clarke	L 1–2	2,452	7–5–2
January 10	7:00 p.m.	Yale		Thompson Arena • Hanover, New Hampshire	ESPN+	Clarke	L 2–3	2,126	7–6–2 (4–3–1)
January 11	7:00 p.m.	Brown		Thompson Arena • Hanover, New Hampshire	ESPN+	Clarke	W 5–2	2,648	8–6–2 (5–3–1)
January 17	7:00 p.m.	at Union		Achilles Rink • Schenectady, New York	ESPN+	Croteau	W 4–0	1,621	9–6–2 (6–3–1)
January 18	7:00 p.m.	at Rensselaer		Houston Field House • Troy, New York	ESPN+	Croteau	W 5–3	1,709	10–6–2 (7–3–1)
January 24	7:00 p.m.	at Colgate		Class of 1965 Arena • Hamilton, New York	ESPN+	Clarke	L 2–3	1,237	10–7–2 (7–4–1)
January 25	7:00 p.m.	at Cornell		Lynah Rink • Ithaca, New York	ESPN+	Croteau	W 6–1	4,267	11–7–2 (8–4–1)
January 31	7:00 p.m.	#14 Quinnipiac		Thompson Arena • Hanover, New Hampshire	ESPN+	Croteau	L 4–5 ^{OT}	2,482	11–8–2 (8–5–1)
February 1	7:00 p.m.	Princeton		Thompson Arena • Hanover, New Hampshire	ESPN+	Clarke	L 1–3	4,667	11–9–2 (8–6–1)
February 7	7:00 p.m.	Harvard		Thompson Arena • Hanover, New Hampshire	ESPN+	Croteau	W 3–2	2,902	12–9–2 (9–6–1)
February 14	7:00 p.m.	at Clarkson		Cheel Arena • Potsdam, New York	ESPN+	Croteau	L 1–4	2,039	12–10–2 (9–7–1)
February 15	7:00 p.m.	at St. Lawrence		Appleton Arena • Canton, New York	ESPN+	Clarke	L 2–3 ^{OT}	574	12–11–2 (9–8–1)
February 21	7:00 p.m.	Rensselaer		Thompson Arena • Hanover, New Hampshire	ESPN+	Croteau	L 1–2	1,886	12–12–2 (9–9–1)
February 22	4:00 p.m.	Union		Thompson Arena • Hanover, New Hampshire	ESPN+	Croteau	W 2–1	2,500	13–12–2 (10–9–1)
February 28	7:00 p.m.	at Brown		Meehan Auditorium • Providence, Rhode Island	ESPN+	Croteau	W 4–2	987	14–12–2 (11–9–1)
March 1	7:00 p.m.	at Yale		Ingalls Rink • New Haven, Connecticut	ESPN+	Croteau	W 5–1	2,155	15–12–2 (12–9–1)
ECAC Hockey Tournament
March 8	7:00 p.m.	St. Lawrence*		Thompson Arena • Hanover, New Hampshire (ECAC First Round)	ESPN+	Croteau	W 6–2	2,248	16–12–2
March 14	7:00 p.m.	at Union*		Achilles Rink • Schenectady, New York (ECAC Quarterfinal Game 1)	ESPN+	Croteau	W 3–2	2,302	17–12–2
March 15	7:00 p.m.	at Union*		Achilles Rink • Schenectady, New York (ECAC Quarterfinal Game 2)	ESPN+	Croteau	W 7–2	2,298	18–12–2
March 21	7:00 p.m.	vs. #18 Clarkson*		Herb Brooks Arena • Lake Placid, New York (ECAC Semifinal)	ESPN+	Clarke	L 1–4	5,320	18–13–2
*Non-conference game. ^{#}Rankings from USCHO.com Poll. All times are in Eastern Time. Source:

== Scoring statistics ==
Name	Position	Games	Goals	Assists	Points	PIM
C. J. Foley	D	33	11	19	30	10
Nikita Nikora	C/W	33	4	26	30	4
Sean Chisholm	C/LW	33	15	12	27	12
Cooper Flinton	LW	32	11	13	24	8
Hayden Stavroff	F	31	10	12	22	43
John Fusco	D	32	11	10	21	39
Hank Cleaves	F	32	5	16	21	10
Luke Haymes	C	22	12	6	18	14
Braiden Dorfman	F	31	7	9	16	22
Cam MacDonald	F	33	6	10	16	10
Alex Krause	F	31	4	8	12	0
Eric Charpentier	D	33	3	8	11	26
Ian Pierce	D	24	1	8	9	13
Steven Townley	F	33	4	4	8	2
Matt Fusco	D	32	1	6	7	4
Jack Silverberg	F	29	0	5	5	15
Nate Morgan	F	17	4	0	4	0
Trym Løkkeberg	C	22	0	3	3	6
Joshua Schenk	F	19	0	2	2	2
Oskari Vuorio	C	4	1	0	1	0
Colin Grable	D	19	0	1	1	8
Tucker McRae	D	26	0	1	1	6
Austin Salani	F	1	0	0	0	2
Roan Clarke	G	17	0	0	0	0
Emmett Croteau	G	18	0	0	0	9
Tim Busconi	D	21	0	0	0	4
Bench	–	–	–	–	–	6
Total			110	179	289	295

== Goaltending statistics ==
Name	Games	Minutes	Wins	Losses	Ties	Goals against	Saves	Shut-outs	SV %	GAA
Emmett Croteau	18	1029:13	13	4	0	36	336	1	.903	2.10
Roan Clarke	17	934:22	5	9	2	42	358	0	.895	2.70
Empty Net	-	30:17	-	-	-	6	-	-	-	-
Total	33	1993:52	18	13	2	84	694	1	.892	2.53

== Rankings ==
Poll	Week																											
Poll	Pre	1	2	3	4	5	6	7	8	9	10	11	12	13	14	15	16	17	18	19	20	21	22	23	24	25	26	27 (Final)
USCHO.com	RV	NR	NR	NR	NR	NR	17	16	15	13	17	17	–	17	RV	RV	RV	RV	RV	RV	NR	NR	RV	RV	RV	RV	–	RV
USA Hockey	RV	NR	NR	NR	NR	NR	17	15	14	14	17	16	–	18	RV	RV	RV	19	RV	RV	NR	NR	RV	RV	RV	RV	RV	RV

Note: USCHO did not release a poll in week 12 or 26.
Note: USA Hockey did not release a poll in week 12.

== Awards and honors ==
Player	Award	Ref
CJ Foley	All-ECAC Hockey First Team	

== 2025 NHL entry draft ==
Round	Pick	Player	College	NHL team
7	204	Grayden Robertson-Palmer ^{†}	Detroit Red Wings	

† incoming freshman
