= 2026 ECAC Hockey men's tournament =

2026 ECAC Hockey men's ice hockey tournament
- Dates: March 6–21, 2026
- Teams: 12
- Finals site: Herb Brooks Arena; Lake Placid, New York
- Champions: Dartmouth (1st title)
- Winning coach: Reid Cashman (1st title)
- MVP: Emmett Croteau (Dartmouth)
- ECAC Hockey men's Ice Hockey Tournaments

The 2026 ECAC Hockey men's tournament is the 65th tournament in league history. It was played between March 6 and March 21, 2026. Dartmouth defeated Princeton 2–1 in overtime to receive ECAC Hockey's automatic bid to the 2026 NCAA Division I men's ice hockey tournament. It was the first ECAC tournament championship in program history.

== Format ==
The tournament features four rounds of play. The teams that finish above fifth place in the standings received a bye to the quarterfinal round. In the first round, the fifth and twelfth seeds, the sixth and eleventh seeds, the seventh and tenth seeds and the eighth and ninth seeds played a single-elimination game with the winners advancing to the quarterfinals. In the quarterfinals the one seed played the lowest remaining seed, the second seed played the second-lowest remaining seed, the third seed played the third-lowest remaining seed and the fourth seed played the fourth-lowest remaining seed each in a best-of-three series with the winners of these the series advancing to the semifinals. In the semifinals the top remaining seed played the lowest remaining seed while the two remaining teams play against each other. The winners of the semifinals play in the championship game, and no third-place game is played. All series after the quarterfinals are single-elimination games. The tournament champion receives an automatic bid to the 2026 NCAA Division I men's ice hockey tournament.

== Conference standings ==
2025–26 ECAC Hockey Standings
| | Conference record | | | | | | | | | | Overall record | | | | | |
| | GP | W | L | T | OTW | OTL | SW | PTS | GF | GA | GP | W | L | T | GF | GA |
|---|---|---|---|---|---|---|---|---|---|---|---|---|---|---|---|---|
| #8 Quinnipiac † | 22 | 17 | 4 | 1 | 2 | 0 | 0 | 50 | 102 | 48 | 40 | 27 | 10 | 3 | 162 | 95 |
| #10 Dartmouth * | 22 | 13 | 5 | 4 | 0 | 1 | 3 | 47 | 81 | 53 | 35 | 23 | 8 | 4 | 125 | 75 |
| #12 Cornell | 22 | 15 | 6 | 1 | 1 | 1 | 1 | 47 | 71 | 42 | 34 | 22 | 11 | 1 | 109 | 69 |
| Princeton | 22 | 11 | 9 | 2 | 0 | 1 | 1 | 37 | 63 | 57 | 34 | 18 | 13 | 3 | 103 | 90 |
| Union | 22 | 11 | 9 | 2 | 1 | 1 | 1 | 36 | 71 | 68 | 37 | 22 | 12 | 3 | 140 | 98 |
| Harvard | 22 | 11 | 10 | 1 | 0 | 1 | 0 | 35 | 61 | 64 | 34 | 16 | 16 | 2 | 92 | 100 |
| Colgate | 22 | 9 | 10 | 3 | 2 | 0 | 2 | 30 | 68 | 74 | 37 | 13 | 20 | 4 | 99 | 125 |
| Clarkson | 22 | 9 | 10 | 3 | 2 | 0 | 1 | 29 | 65 | 65 | 38 | 18 | 17 | 3 | 111 | 111 |
| Rensselaer | 22 | 8 | 13 | 1 | 0 | 1 | 0 | 26 | 55 | 70 | 35 | 11 | 23 | 1 | 80 | 115 |
| Yale | 22 | 7 | 14 | 1 | 2 | 2 | 0 | 22 | 63 | 80 | 31 | 8 | 22 | 1 | 79 | 115 |
| St. Lawrence | 22 | 6 | 15 | 1 | 0 | 0 | 1 | 20 | 59 | 99 | 35 | 7 | 25 | 3 | 85 | 151 |
| Brown | 22 | 4 | 16 | 2 | 0 | 2 | 1 | 17 | 44 | 83 | 31 | 5 | 24 | 2 | 63 | 119 |
Championship: March 21, 2026 † indicates conference regular season champion (Cleary Cup) * indicates conference tournament champion (Whitelaw Cup); Rankings: USCHO.com Top 20 Poll; updated April 15, 2026

== Bracket ==
Teams are reseeded for the quarterfinal and semifinal rounds

First Round; March 6–7
5 | Union | 9
12 | Brown | 0
6 | Harvard | 4*
11 | St. Lawrence | 3
7 | Colgate | 3
10 | Yale | 2
8 | Clarkson | 2
9 | Rensselaer | 1

Quarterfinals; March 13–15
1 | Quinnipiac | 0 | 3 | -
8 | Clarkson | 3 | 4 | -
2 | Dartmouth | 4 | 4 | -
7 | Colgate | 1 | 1 | -
3 | Cornell | 1 | 4 | 5
6 | Harvard | 3 | 0 | 2
4 | Princeton | 5 | 5 | -
5 | Union | 2 | 2 | -

Semifinals; March 20
2 | Dartmouth | 4
8 | Clarkson | 0
3 | Cornell | 2
4 | Princeton | 3

Championship; March 21
2 | Dartmouth | 2*
4 | Princeton | 1

Note: * denotes overtime period(s)

== Results ==
Note: All game times are local.

=== First Round ===
==== (5) Union vs. (12) Brown ====
| March 7, 2026; 5:00 pm | Union | 9–0 (1–0, 3–0, 5–0) | Brown | M&T Bank Center; Attendance: 2,499 |

Game reference

Cameron Korpi
Goalies
Tyler Shea
Referees:
Jason Williams
Ryan Sweeney
Linesmen:
Cameron Goebert
Stephen Drain

| (Dunbar, Lindauer) Lucas Buzziol (13) – 08:19 | 1–0 |
| (Rose) Parker Lindauer (8) – 28:26 | 2–0 |
| (Lessard, Buhr) Colby MacArthur (11) – PP – 33:51 | 3–0 |
| (MacArthur, Dunbar) Brandon Buhr (19) – 36:46 | 4–0 |
| (Muthersbaugh, Lessard) Colby MacArthur (12) – 40:38 | 5–0 |
| (Dunbar, Hanley) Ben Muthersbaugh (19) – PP – 51:18 | 6–0 |
| (Muthersbaugh, Hanley) Lucas Buzziol (14) – PP – 53:23 | 7–0 |
| (Jeannette, Pelton) Ethan Benz (1) – PP – 54:50 | 8–0 |
| (Lindauer, Buzziol) Riley Brueck (10) – 56:30 | 9–0 |

4 min
Penalties
14 min
59
Shots
22

==== (6) Harvard vs. (11) St. Lawrence ====
| March 6, 2026; 7:00 pm | Harvard | 4–3 (OT) (1–1, 1–1, 1–1); OT: (1–0) | St. Lawrence | Bright-Landry Hockey Center; Attendance: 809 |

Game reference

Ben Charette
Goalies
Cameron Smith
Referees:
Cameron Lynch
Charles Hanafin
Linesmen:
Ryan Knapp
Patrick Dapuzzo

| | 0–1 | 1:50 – Cooper Pierson (5) (Cristall, Brown) |
| (Gallant, Thompson) Aidan Lane (6) – PP – 10:18 | 1–1 |
| | 1–2 | 29:58 – Rasmus Svartstrom (17) (Olenginski, Westling) |
| Heikki Ruohonen (6) – SH – 33:08 | 2–2 |
| | 2–3 | 47:41 – Sam LeDrew (10) (Casey) |
| (Ruohonen, Gallant) Michael Callow (2) – 55:31 | 3–3 |
| (Severo) Mick Thompson (9) – 78:20 | 4–3 |

6 min
Penalties
6 min
40
Shots
36

==== (7) Colgate vs. (10) Yale ====
| March 7, 2026; 7:00 pm | Colgate | 3–2 (0–1, 2–1, 1–0) | Yale | Class of 1965 Arena; Attendance: 1,195 |

Game reference

Reid Dyck
Goalies
Noah Pak
Referees:
Matthew Wyld
Kevin Graber
Linesmen:
Adam Wood
Ryan Chauvin

| | 0–1 | 8:56 – Iisai Pesonen (6) (Chen, Berger) |
| | 0–2 | 26:45 – Ronan O'Donnell (12) (Chen, Andreychuk) |
| (Neumeier, Spinale) Antonio Fernandez (4) – 31:54 | 1–2 |
| (Schneider, Malboeuf) Michael Neumerier (7) – 34:44 | 2–2 |
| Simon Labelle (22) – 55:57 | 3–2 |

10 min
Penalties
6 min
40
Shots
25

==== (8) Clarkson vs. (9) Rensselaer ====
| March 6, 2026; 7:00 pm | Clarkson | 2–1 (0–0, 1–1, 1–0) | Rensselaer | Cheel Arena; Attendance: 2,730 |

Game reference

Shane Soderwall
Goalies
Nathan Krawchuk
Referees:
Matt Terreri
Joe Carusone
Linesmen:
Donovan Ott
Jason Shattie

| | 0–1 | 34:33 – Ian Scherzer (4) (VanDamme, Hilditch) |
| (Mangan, Sukovic) Tate Taylor (7) – 35:32 | 1–1 |
| (Mayich) Justin Côté (10) – 55:16 | 2–1 |

2 min
Penalties
4 min
33
Shots
22

=== Quarterfinals ===
==== (1) Quinnipiac vs. (8) Clarkson ====
| March 13, 2026; 7:00 pm | Quinnipiac | 0–3 (0–0, 0–1, 0–2) | Clarkson | M&T Bank Arena; Attendance: 2,268 |

Game reference

Dylan Silverstein
Goalies
Shane Soderwall
Referees:
Cameron Lynch
Jason Williams
Linesmen:
Stephen Drain
Dan Taggart

| 0–1 | 22:56 – Bryce Sookro (1) (Letourneau, O'Donnell) |
| 0–2 | 57:55 – EN – Tate Taylor (8) (Mayich) |
| 0–3 | 59:27 – EN – Erik Bargholtz (7) (Brassington) |

10 min
Penalties
12 min
24
Shots
35

| March 14, 2026; 4:00 pm | Quinnipiac | 3–4 (1–0, 0–1, 2–3) | Clarkson | M&T Bank Arena; Attendance: 2,441 |

Game reference

Dylan Silverstein
Goalies
Shane Soderwall
Referees:
Ryan Sweeney
Joseph Carusone
Linesmen:
Patrick Dapuzzo
Stephen Drain

| (Wyttenbach) Markus Vidicek (20) – 15:58 | 1–0 |
| | 1–1 | 27:32 – PP – Justin Côté (11) (Taylor, Brassington) |
| (Pelosi, Marcellus) Braden Blace (4) – 43:01 | 2–1 |
| (Verreault) Braden Blace (5) – 44:03 | 3–1 |
| | 3–2 | 52:20 – SH – Shawn O'Donnell (3) |
| | 3–3 | 52:58 – SH – Matthew Mayich (7) (Bargholtz, Sukovic) |
| | 3–4 | 54:21 – Erik Bargholtz (8) (Mayich, Sookro) |

18 min
Penalties
24 min
18
Shots
35

| Clarkson wins series 2–0 |

==== (2) Dartmouth vs. (7) Colgate ====
| March 13, 2026; 7:00 pm | Dartmouth | 4–1 (1–1, 1–0, 2–0) | Colgate | Thompson Arena; Attendance: 2,474 |

Game reference

Emmett Croteau
Goalies
Reid Dyck
Referees:
Matthew Wyld
William Brennan III
Linesmen:
Jason Shattie
Ryan Chauvin

| | 0–1 | 7:53 – Jake Schneider (6) (Napier, Norlin) |
| Ryan Schelling (6) – 12:10 | 1–1 |
| (Foley, Silverberg) Hank Cleaves (15) – PP – 39:11 | 2–1 |
| (Grable, MacDonald) Hayden Stavroff (28) – 41:25 | 3–1 |
| (Stavroff, Foley) Hank Cleaves (16) – 46:39 | 4–1 |

6 min
Penalties
4 min
37
Shots
21

| March 14, 2026; 7:00 pm | Dartmouth | 4–1 (1–0, 1–1, 2–0) | Colgate | Thompson Arena; Attendance: 2,787 |

Game reference

Emmett Croteau
Mikey Roberts
Goalies
Reid Dyck
Referees:
Cameron Lynch
William Brennan III
Linesmen:
Jason Shattie
Ryan Chauvin

| (Nikora, Foley) Jack Silverberg (7) – PP – 15:11 | 1–0 |
| (Busconi) Nathan Morin (8) – 24:31 | 2–0 |
| | 2–1 | 28:27 – Simon LaBelle (13) (Norlin, Doucette) |
| (Stavroff, Nikora) Hank Cleaves (17) – PP – 41:20 | 3–1 |
| (Cummings) Cam MacDonald (6) – EN – 56:31 | 4–1 |

24 min
Penalties
31 min
23
Shots
25

| Dartmouth wins series 2–0 |

==== (3) Cornell vs. (6) Harvard ====
| March 13, 2026; 7:00 pm | Cornell | 1–3 (0–1, 1–1, 0–1) | Harvard | Lynah Rink; Attendance: 4,267 |

Game reference

Alexis Cournoyer
Goalies
Ben Charette
Referees:
Kenneth Gates
Matt Terreri
Linesmen:
Donovan Ott
Cameron Goebert

| | 0-1 | 10:21 – Michael Callow (3) (Morden, Ruohonen) |
| (Fegaras, Castagna) Luke Ashton (3) – 28:11 | 1-1 |
| | 1-2 | 36:18 – GW SH – Ben MacDonald (5) (Gallant) |
| | 1-3 | 58:31 – EN – Ben MacDonald (6) (Charette) |

4 min
Penalties
2 min
31
Shots
22

| March 14, 2026; 7:00 pm | Cornell | 4–0 (2–0, 1–0, 1–0) | Harvard | Lynah Rink; Attendance: 4,267 |

Game reference

Alexis Cournoyer
Goalies
Ben Charette
Referees:
Anthony Kenney
Kenneth Gates
Linesmen:
Cameron Goebert
Adam Wood

| (O'Brien, Major) Nick DeSantis (4) – GW – 05:45 | 1-0 |
| (Ryan, Walsh) Jake Kraft (7) – 08:28 | 2-0 |
| (Walsh, Ryan) Jake Kraft (8) – 25:16 | 3-0 |
| (Major, Veilleux) Hoyt Stanley (3) – PP – 54:38 | 4-0 |

6 min
Penalties
4 min
32
Shots
16

| March 15, 2026; 4:00 pm | Cornell | 5-2 (1-1, 2-0, 2-1) | Harvard | Lynah Rink; Attendance: 4,267 |

Game reference

Alexis Cournoyer
Goalies
Ben Charette
Referees:
CJ Hanafin
Jason Williams
Linesmen:
Donovan Ott
Adam Wood

| | 0-1 | 09:34 – PP – Lucas St. Louis (1) (Callow, Ruohonen) |
| (Major, DeSantis) Reegan Hiscock (6) – 10:49 | 1-1 |
| (Veilleux, Major) Ryan Walsh (9) – PP – 30:16 | 2-1 |
| (Ryan, Walsh) Michael Fisher (1) – GW – 34:04 | 3-1 |
| | 3-2 | 47:18 – Will Hughes (4) (Solovey, Morden) |
| (Fegaras, Ashton) Jake Kraft (9) – EN – 59:02 | 4-2 |
| (Kraft) Jonathan Castagna (15) – EN – 59:40 | 5-2 |

2 min
Penalties
6 min
26
Shots
24

| Cornell wins series 2–1 |

==== (4) Princeton vs. (5) Union ====
| March 13, 2026; 7:00 pm | Princeton | 5–2 (1–0, 2–0, 2–2) | Union | Hobey Baker Memorial Rink; Attendance: 1,427 |

Game reference

Arthur Smith
Goalies
Cameron Korpi
Brayden Gillespie
Referees:
Charles Hanafin
Tom Steinel
Linesmen:
Patrick Dapuzzo
Ryan Knapp

| (Green, Anderson) Joshua Karnish (4) – 6:18 | 1–0 |
| (Pelletier, Ma) Tyler Rubin (3) – 23:58 | 2–0 |
| (Jacobs) Jake Manfre (13) – 27:58 | 3–0 |
| (Daniells, Jacobs) Jake Manfre (14) – 40:23 | 4–0 |
| | 4–1 | 55:00 – Ethan Benz (2) (Hart, Jeannette) |
| (Sison) Jaxson Ezman (10) – EN – 56:32 | 5–1 |
| | 5–2 | 58:56 – Parker Lindauer (9) (Buzziol, Brueck) |

12 min
Penalties
4 min
24
Shots
31

| March 14, 2026; 7:00 pm | Princeton | 5–2 (1–1, 0–1, 4–0) | Union | Hobey Baker Memorial Rink; Attendance: 1,680 |

Game reference

Cameron Korpi
Goalies
Arthur Smith
Referees:
Charles Hanafin
Jason Williams
Linesmen:
Ryan Knapp
Dylan Lewis

| (Jacobs) Kai Daniells (17) – 7:32 | 1–0 |
| | 1–1 | 16:14 – PP – Etienne Lessard (5) (MacArthur, Buhr) |
| | 1–2 | 31:03 – SH – Parker Lindauer (10) (MacArthur) |
| (Daniells, Jacobs) Jaxson Ezman (11) – PP – 43:00 | 2–2 |
| (Jacobs, Marciano) Kai Daniells (18) – 47:14 | 3–2 |
| (Jacobs) Jake Manfre (15) – EN – 58:19 | 4–2 |
| Kai Daniells (19) – EN – 58:38 | 5–2 |

8 min
Penalties
8 min
23
Shots
24

| Princeton wins series 2–0 |

=== Semifinals ===
==== (2) Dartmouth vs. (8) Clarkson ====
| March 20, 2026; 4:00 pm | Dartmouth | 4–0 (2–0, 0–0, 2–0) | Clarkson | Herb Brooks Arena; Attendance: 5,164 |

Game reference

Emmett Croteau
Goalies
Shane Soderwall
Referees:
Cameron Lynch
Ryan Sweeney
Linesmen:
Adam Wood
Jason Shattie

| (Krause, Busconi) Nathan Morin (9) – 12:26 | 1–0 |
| (Silverberg, Foley) Colin Grable (6) – 18:13 | 2–0 |
| (unassisted) Jack Silverberg (8) – EN – 56:22 | 3–0 |
| (unassisted) Alex Krause (5) – EN – 58:15 | 4–0 |

10 min
Penalties
8 min
26
Shots
31

==== (3) Cornell vs. (4) Princeton ====
| March 20, 2026; 7:00 pm | Cornell | 2–3 (1–0, 1–2, 0–1) | Princeton | Herb Brooks Arena; Attendance: 5,164 |

Game reference

Alexis Cournoyer
Goalies
Arthur Smith
Referees:
Jason Williams
Kenneth Gates
Linesmen:
Ryan Chauvin
Stephen Drain

| (Fisher, Walsh) George Fegaras (5) – 2:32 | 1–0 |
| | 1–1 | 22:35 – David Jacobs (10) (Devlin, Daniells) |
| | 1–2 | 26:32 – Julian Facchinelli (7) (Gorman) |
| (Stanley, Major) Ryan Walsh (10) – PP – 37:13 | 2–2 |
| | 2–3 | 52:05 – Joshua Karnish (5) (Daniells, Anderson) |

8 min
Penalties
10 min
23
Shots
24

=== Championship ===
==== (2) Dartmouth vs. (4) Princeton ====
| March 21, 2026; 5:00 pm | Dartmouth | 2–1 (OT) (1–0, 0–0, 0–1, 1–0) | Princeton | Herb Brooks Arena; Attendance: 5,454 |

Game reference

Emmett Croteau
Goalies
Arthur Smith
Referees:
Charles Hanafin
Joseph Carusone
Linesmen:
Patrick Dapuzzo
Ryan Knapp

| (Foley, Cleaves) Hayden Stavroff (29) – PP – 12:45 | 1–0 |
| | 1–1 | 48:46 – Joshua Karnish (6) (Green) |
| (unassisted)Tim Busconi (2) – 71:18 | 2–1 |

6 min
Penalties
7 min
23
Shots
26

== Tournament awards ==
=== All-Tournament Team ===
- G Emmett Croteau* (Dartmouth)
- D Tim Busconi (Dartmouth)
- D C. J. Foley (Dartmouth)
- F Kai Daniells (Princeton)
- F Joshua Karnish (Princeton)
- F Hayden Stavroff (Dartmouth)

* Most Outstanding Player(s)
