= 2024–25 Quinnipiac Bobcats men's ice hockey season =

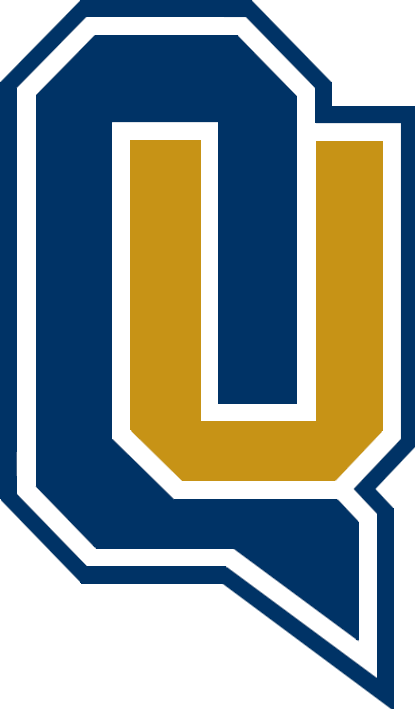

ECAC Hockey Regular Season, Champion NCAA Tournament, Regional Semifinal
- Conference: 1st ECAC Hockey
- Home ice: M&T Bank Arena

Rankings
- USCHO: #11
- USA Hockey: #12

Record
- Overall: 24–12–2
- Conference: 16–5–1
- Home: 15–5–1
- Road: 8–4–0
- Neutral: 2–2–1

Coaches and captains
- Head coach: Rand Pecknold
- Assistant coaches: Joe Dumais; Rick Bennett; Justin Eddy
- Captain: Travis Treloar
- Alternate captain(s): Noah Altman; Cooper Moore; Davis Pennington

The 2024–25 Quinnipiac Bobcats Men's ice hockey season was the 49th season of play for the program, the 27th at the Division I level and 20th in ECAC Hockey. The Bobcats represented Quinnipiac University in the 2024–25 NCAA Division I men's ice hockey season, played their home games at the M&T Bank Arena and were coached by Rand Pecknold in his 31st season.

== Season ==
As Quinnipiac entered the season, the team was having to deal with significant changes to its roster. While the number of new players was typical of the transfer portal era, the Bobcats had lost five of their top seven scorers from a year before. While the team brought in several experienced players, the Bobcats would be hard-pressed to replicate the performance that had given them the nation's #4 offense in '24. Quinnipiac's defense was an even bigger unknown as the team lost four of its top six blueliners, returning only Cooper Moore and Davis Pennington. Rand Pecknold's answer here was to swap in several NHL draft picks and a graduate transfer to try an insulate an inexperienced goaltending tandem. Dylan Silverstein transferred in from Boston College but had yet to see any action at the college level. On the other hand, Matej Marinov had looked good in the few games he played as a freshman but had yet to be tested against a formidable opponent.

The uncertainty in the lineup manifested in a rough start to the season. Quinnipiac was up and down through their first eight games and appeared like their run at the top of ECAC Hockey might finally come to an end. However, by mid-November the Bobcats were able to right the ship and began stringing wins together. Silverstein had taken possession of the Bobcat crease and was being well insulated by a solid defensive effort. Also, after struggling through some inconsistency early, the offense had rounded into a formidable force. Quinnipiac was able to call upon three lines for scoring contributions with eight forwards managing to post at least 10 goals during the campaign.

Over a two-month span, the team compiled an 11–2–2 record. The extended stretch of good performances enabled the Bobcats to place themselves firmly atop the conference standings. However, due to the relative weakness of the ECAC this season, the Bobcats were struggling to gain any ground in the PairWise rankings. After being dethroned in the Connecticut Ice tournament for the first time in four years, Quinnipiac was hovering around the tournament bubble and was in jeopardy of falling short of an at-large bid. Over the final month of the regular season, Quinnipiac managed to keep its head above water with an acceptable 6–2 run that saw it lose two overtime games to one of the few quality conference opponents (Clarkson) . During this time Marinov had begun to get more time in goal and, when the team began the postseason, he was tabbed as the starter.

=== Postseason ===
Quinnipiac's fifth consecutive Cleary Cup gave the team a bye into the quarterfinal round where they met Brown. The Bears were hopelessly outgunned and, despite equaling the Bobcats in shots, were outscored 8–1 in the two games. Quinnipiac was able to pad its scoring totals with two empty-net goals thanks to the exemplary performance in goal by Marinov. In the semifinal round, the Bobcats faced off against Cornell who were in the middle of a tremendous run of games. Quinnipiac's offense struggled to get shots on goal through the oppressive Big Red defense but were able to get their first lead of the match during the latter half of the third period. The situation began to look well in hand when Cornell was handed a penalty with 1:50 left in the game, however, Cornell won the ensuing faceoff, raced down the ice and tied the game. Quinnipiac was stunned by the turn of events and failed to convert on the power play, forcing the match into overtime. Defense continued to be the main feature of the game with scoring chances few and far between. In the back half of the period, Moore was given his second minor penalty of the match and Cornell made full use of their opportunity, scoring the winning goal about a minute later.

While the Bobcats were again stymied in the conference semifinals, the Bobcats had won just enough games to lift them up to #12 in the PairWise rankings. A few days later, when all of the automatic bids had been handed out, the Bobcats were still above the cutoff and were able to return to the NCAA tournament. The Bobcats were placed in the Allentown Regional opposite to Connecticut. Eager to avenge their earlier loss to the Huskies in Connecticut Ice, The team made a rather surprising move by starting Silverstein who hadn't seen any game action in a month. The move did not pay off as the Bobcats found themselves down by 2 goals at the end of the first period. Jeremy Wilmer cut the lead in half in the middle of the second, giving Quinnipiac a brief hope that they could mount a comeback, however, UConn was able to reestablish their 2-goal lead before the start of the third. The final 20 minutes saw a furious attack come from Bobcats but no matter how hard they tried they could not solve the Connecticut goaltender. After several near-misses, the team pulled Silverstein for an extra attacker. A lucky break saw the puck roll on edge after being cleared down the ice and curl into the Bobcat cage, effectively ending their season.

== Departures ==
Player	Position	Nationality	Cause
Vinny Duplessis	Goaltender	Canada	Graduation (signed with Utah Grizzlies)
Christophe Fillion	Forward	Canada	Graduate transfer to Miami
Collin Graf	Forward	United States	Signed professional contract (San Jose Sharks)
Timothy Heinke	Forward	United States	Transferred to Holy Cross
Jayden Lee	Defenseman	Canada	Graduation (signed with Hershey Bears)
Charles-Alexis Legault	Defenseman	Canada	Signed professional contract (Carolina Hurricanes)
Sam Lipkin	Forward	United States	Signed professional contract (Utah Hockey Club)
Jake Martin	Defenseman	United States	Left program (retired)
C. J. McGee	Defenseman	United States	Graduation (signed with Savannah Ghost Pirates)
Jacob Quillan	Forward	Canada	Signed professional contract (Toronto Maple Leafs)
Iivari Räsänen	Defenseman	Finland	Graduation (signed with KalPa)
Cristophe Tellier	Forward	Canada	Transferred to Northeastern
Zach Tupker	Forward	Canada	Graduation (signed with Greenville Swamp Rabbits)
Nicky Wallace	Defenseman	United States	Transferred to American International

== Recruiting ==
Player	Position	Nationality	Age	Notes
Nate Benoit	Defenseman	United States	21	Bow, NH; transfer from North Dakota; selected 182nd overall in 2021
Braden Blace	Defenseman	Canada	21	Duncan, BC
Aaron Bohlinger	Defenseman	United States	24	Newburgh, NY; graduate transfer from Massachusetts
Tyler Borgula	Forward	United States	18	Livonia, MI
Noah Eyre	Forward	United States	20	Vienna, VA
Elliott Groenewold	Defenseman	United States	18	Bellows Falls, VT; selected 110th overall in 2024
Drew Hockley	Defenseman	Canada	19	Kentville, NS; joined mid-season
Charlie Leddy	Defenseman	United States	20	Fairfield, CT; transfer from Boston College; selected 126th overall in 2022
Christopher Pelosi	Forward	United States	19	Sewell, NJ; selected 92nd overall in 2023
Jack Ricketts	Forward	Canada	25	Oakville, ON; graduate transfer from Holy Cross
Michael Salandra	Forward	United States	21	Pleasantville, NY
Aaron Schwartz	Forward	United States	20	Parkland, FL
Dylan Silverstein	Goaltender	United States	20	Calabasas, CA; transfer from Boston College
Ryan Smith	Forward	United States	18	Pendleton, NY
Jeremy Wilmer	Forward	United States	21	Rockville Centre, NY; transfer from Boston University

== Roster ==
As of September 10, 2024.

No.	Nat.	Player	Class	Pos	Height	Weight	DoB	Hometown	Previous team	NHL rights
2	(Canada)	Drew Hockley	Freshman	D	6' 3" (1.91 m)	190 lb (86 kg)	2005-03-03	Kentville, Nova Scotia	Victoria Grizzlies (BCHL)	—
3	(United States)	Cooper Moore (A)	Graduate	D	6' 2" (1.88 m)	187 lb (85 kg)	2001-02-16	Greenwich, Connecticut	North Dakota (NCHC)	DET, 128th overall 2019
4	(United States)	Davis Pennington (A)	Senior	D	5' 10" (1.78 m)	185 lb (84 kg)	2001-05-27	Saline, Michigan	Omaha (NCHC)	—
5	(United States)	Aaron Bohlinger	Graduate	D	5' 9" (1.75 m)	165 lb (75 kg)	2000-08-25	Walden, New York	Massachusetts (HEA)	—
6	(United States)	Charlie Leddy	Junior	D	6' 2" (1.88 m)	185 lb (84 kg)	2004-01-11	Fairfield, Connecticut	Boston College (HEA)	NJD, 126th overall 2022
7	(United States)	Elliott Groenewold	Freshman	D	6' 2" (1.88 m)	201 lb (91 kg)	2006-02-04	Bellows Falls, Vermont	Cedar Rapids RoughRiders (USHL)	BOS, 110th overall 2024
8	(United States)	Matthew McGroarty	Sophomore	F	5' 10" (1.78 m)	172 lb (78 kg)	2003-01-30	Westport, Connecticut	Madison Capitols (USHL)	—
10	(United States)	Tyler Borgula	Freshman	F	5' 9" (1.75 m)	170 lb (77 kg)	2005-10-06	Livonia, Michigan	Sioux Falls Stampede (USHL)	—
11	(United States)	Aaron Schwartz	Freshman	F	5' 11" (1.8 m)	174 lb (79 kg)	2004-03-22	Parkland, Florida	Surrey Eagles (USHL)	—
12	(United States)	Ryan Smith	Freshman	F	5' 9" (1.75 m)	179 lb (81 kg)	2005-10-03	Pendleton, New York	Tri-City Storm (USHL)	—
13	(United States)	Noah Eyre	Freshman	F	5' 11" (1.8 m)	176 lb (80 kg)	2004-06-22	Vienna, Virginia	Sioux Falls Stampede (USHL)	—
14	(United States)	Victor Czerneckianair	Junior	F	5' 11" (1.8 m)	174 lb (79 kg)	2002-02-17	Southington, Connecticut	Tri-City Storm (USHL)	—
15	(Canada)	Jack Ricketts	Graduate	F	6' 1" (1.85 m)	195 lb (88 kg)	1999-09-08	Oakville, Ontario	Holy Cross (AHA)	—
16	(United States)	Jeremy Wilmer	Junior	F	5' 8" (1.73 m)	155 lb (70 kg)	2003-08-16	Rockville Centre, New York	Boston University (HEA)	—
17	(Sweden)	Travis Treloar (C)	Graduate	F	5' 11" (1.8 m)	176 lb (80 kg)	2001-05-12	Kalmar, Sweden	Ohio State (Big Ten)	—
18	(United States)	Anthony Cipollone	Junior	F	5' 6" (1.68 m)	165 lb (75 kg)	2002-05-14	Purchase, New York	Brooks Bandits (AJHL)	—
19	(United States)	Chase Ramsay	Sophomore	D	6' 0" (1.83 m)	181 lb (82 kg)	2003-06-10	Granite Springs, New York	Des Moines Buccaneers (USHL)	—
20	(Canada)	Mason Marcellus	Sophomore	F	5' 9" (1.75 m)	165 lb (75 kg)	2002-07-19	Greely, Ontario	Lincoln Stars (USHL)	—
22	(Canada)	Braden Blace	Freshman	D	6' 3" (1.91 m)	190 lb (86 kg)	2003-09-09	Duncan, British Columbia	Alberni Valley Bulldogs (BCHL)	—
23	(United States)	Michael Salandra	Freshman	F	5' 10" (1.78 m)	187 lb (85 kg)	2003-06-13	Pleasantville, New York	West Kelowna Warriors (BCHL)	—
24	(Canada)	Alex Power	Junior	F	6' 1" (1.85 m)	185 lb (84 kg)	2002-01-04	St. John's, Newfoundland and Labrador	Bonnyville Pontiacs (AJHL)	—
25	(United States)	Nate Benoit	Sophomore	D	6' 0" (1.83 m)	183 lb (83 kg)	2002-11-26	Bow, New Hampshire	North Dakota (NCHC)	MIN, 182nd overall 2021
27	(United States)	Andon Cerbone	Sophomore	F	5' 9" (1.75 m)	163 lb (74 kg)	2004-04-13	Stamford, Connecticut	Youngstown Phantoms (USHL)	—
28	(United States)	Chris Pelosi	Freshman	F	6' 1" (1.85 m)	181 lb (82 kg)	2005-03-05	Sewell, New Jersey	Sioux Falls Stampede (USHL)	BOS, 92nd overall 2023
29	(United States)	Dylan Silverstein	Freshman (RS)	G	6' 0" (1.83 m)	179 lb (81 kg)	2004-02-07	Calabasas, California	Sioux City Musketeers (USHL)	—
31	(United States)	Noah Altman (A)	Senior	G	6' 7" (2.01 m)	209 lb (95 kg)	2000-08-16	Los Angeles, California	Bismarck Bobcats (NAHL)	—
33	(Slovakia)	Matej Marinov	Sophomore	G	6' 0" (1.83 m)	157 lb (71 kg)	2003-06-16	Nitra, Slovakia	Fargo Force (USHL)	—

== Standings ==
2024–25 ECAC Hockey Standings
	Conference record										Overall record					
	GP	W	L	T	OTW	OTL	SW	PTS	GF	GA	GP	W	L	T	GF	GA
#15 Quinnipiac †	22	16	5	1	2	3	0	50	79	42	38	24	12	2	135	83
#20 Clarkson	22	15	6	1	2	1	0	45	74	47	39	24	12	3	121	87
Colgate	22	13	7	2	2	2	1	42	80	65	36	18	15	3	114	116
Union	22	12	8	2	0	0	2	40	67	61	36	19	14	3	112	109
Dartmouth	22	12	9	1	0	2	0	39	70	52	33	18	13	2	110	84
#12 Cornell *	22	10	8	4	1	0	3	36	69	53	36	19	11	6	112	82
Harvard	22	9	10	3	2	2	1	31	56	56	33	13	17	3	85	97
Brown	22	9	11	2	3	0	2	28	53	63	32	14	15	3	79	85
Princeton	22	7	12	3	2	2	1	25	55	73	30	12	15	3	71	86
Rensselaer	22	7	15	0	0	2	0	23	57	82	35	12	21	2	101	131
Yale	22	5	14	3	1	1	1	19	52	80	30	6	21	3	67	121
St. Lawrence	22	5	15	2	1	1	1	18	43	81	35	9	24	2	71	121
Championship: March 22, 2025 † indicates conference regular season champion (Cleary Cup) * indicates conference tournament champion (Whitelaw Cup); Rankings: USCHO.com Top 20 Poll

== Schedule and results ==
Date	Time	Opponent^{#}	Rank^{#}	Site	TV	Decision	Result	Attendance	Record
Exhibition
October 6	4:00 pm	#20т Northeastern*	#8	M&T Bank Arena • Hamden, Connecticut (Exhibition)	ESPN+		L 2–4		
Regular Season
October 12	7:00 pm	Penn State*	#8	M&T Bank Arena • Hamden, Connecticut	ESPN+	Marinov	W 3–2	3,477	1–0–0
October 18	7:00 pm	at #9 Maine*	#7	Alfond Arena • Orono, Maine	ESPN+	Silverstein	L 1–2	5,043	1–1–0
October 19	7:00 pm	at #9 Maine*	#7	Alfond Arena • Orono, Maine	ESPN+	Marinov	L 5–6 ^{OT}	5,043	1–2–0
October 25	7:00 pm	New Hampshire*	#11	M&T Bank Arena • Hamden, Connecticut	ESPN+, NESN	Silverstein	W 8–2 ^{OT}	3,402	2–2–0
October 26	4:00 pm	New Hampshire*	#11	M&T Bank Arena • Hamden, Connecticut	ESPN+	Silverstein	L 2–3	3,541	2–3–0
November 2	7:00 pm	at Holy Cross*	#14	Hart Center • Worcester, Massachusetts	FloHockey, NESN	Silverstein	W 3–0	2,100	3–3–0
November 8	7:00 pm	Dartmouth	#15	M&T Bank Arena • Hamden, Connecticut	ESPN+	Silverstein	L 2–4	3,121	3–4–0 (0–1–0)
November 9	7:00 pm	Harvard	#15	M&T Bank Arena • Hamden, Connecticut	ESPN+	Marinov	L 0–3	3,429	3–5–0 (0–2–0)
November 15	7:00 pm	at Brown	#19	Meehan Auditorium • Providence, Rhode Island	ESPN+	Marinov	W 3–2	907	4–5–0 (1–2–0)
November 16	7:00 pm	at Yale	#19	Ingalls Rink • New Haven, Connecticut	ESPN+	Silverstein	W 4–1	3,126	5–5–0 (2–2–0)
November 22	7:00 pm	at #8 Cornell	#18	Lynah Rink • Ithaca, New York	ESPN+	Silverstein	W 3–1	3,980	6–5–0 (3–2–0)
November 23	7:00 pm	at Colgate	#18	Class of 1965 Arena • Hamilton, New York	ESPN+	Silverstein	L 2–3	886	6–6–0 (3–3–0)
November 30	7:00 pm	vs. #11 Cornell*	#18	Madison Square Garden • New York, New York (The Frozen Apple)	ESPN+	Silverstein	T 3–3 ^{SOL}	16,593	6–6–1
December 6	7:00 pm	Rensselaer	#18	M&T Bank Arena • Hamden, Connecticut	ESPN+	Silverstein	W 3–1	3,223	7–6–1 (4–3–0)
December 7	4:00 pm	Union	#18	M&T Bank Arena • Hamden, Connecticut	ESPN+	Silverstein	W 3–1	3,008	8–6–1 (5–3–0)
December 29	4:00 pm	American International*	#18	M&T Bank Arena • Hamden, Connecticut	ESPN+	Marinov	W 6–5	3,111	9–6–1
January 1	7:00 pm	at Harvard	#18	Bright-Landry Hockey Center • Boston, Massachusetts	ESPN+	Marinov	W 3–2 ^{OT}	—	10–6–1 (6–3–0)
January 4	4:00 pm	Northeastern*	#18	M&T Bank Arena • Hamden, Connecticut	ESPN+	Silverstein	L 1–5	3,088	10–7–1
January 6	7:00 pm	Stonehill*	#20	M&T Bank Arena • Hamden, Connecticut	ESPN+	Marinov	W 6–1	1,505	11–7–1
January 10	7:00 pm	at Princeton	#20	Hobey Baker Memorial Rink • Princeton, New Jersey	ESPN+	Silverstein	W 4–2	1,935	12–7–1 (7–3–0)
January 11	7:00 pm	Princeton	#20	M&T Bank Arena • Hamden, Connecticut	ESPN+	Marinov	W 3–0	2,995	13–7–1 (8–3–0)
January 17	7:00 pm	Colgate	#16	M&T Bank Arena • Hamden, Connecticut	ESPN+	Silverstein	W 6–3	2,734	14–7–1 (9–3–0)
January 18	7:00 pm	Cornell	#16	M&T Bank Arena • Hamden, Connecticut	ESPN+	Silverstein	T 2–2 ^{SOL}	3,019	14–7–2 (9–3–1)
Connecticut Ice
January 24	4:00 pm	vs. #13 Connecticut*	#15	Martire Family Arena • Fairfield, Connecticut (Connecticut Ice Semifinal)	SNY	Silverstein	L 1–2	2,794	14–8–2
January 25	4:00 pm	vs. Yale*	#15	Martire Family Arena • Fairfield, Connecticut (Connecticut Ice Consolation Game)	SNY	Silverstein	W 6–2	2,088	15–8–2
January 31	7:00 pm	at Dartmouth	#14	Thompson Arena • Hanover, New Hampshire	ESPN+	Silverstein	W 5–4 ^{OT}	2,482	16–8–2 (10–3–1)
February 7	7:00 pm	St. Lawrence	#14	M&T Bank Arena • Hamden, Connecticut	ESPN+	Marinov	W 6–1	3,097	17–8–2 (11–3–1)
February 8	7:00 pm	Clarkson	#14	M&T Bank Arena • Hamden, Connecticut	ESPN+	Silverstein	L 2–3 ^{OT}	2,876	17–9–2 (11–4–1)
February 14	7:00 pm	at Union	#15	Achilles Rink • Schenectady, New York	ESPN+	Silverstein	W 7–2	1,889	18–9–2 (12–4–1)
February 15	7:00 pm	at Rensselaer	#15	Houston Field House • Troy, New York	ESPN+	Marinov	W 6–2	1,762	19–9–2 (13–4–1)
February 21	7:00 pm	Yale	#14	M&T Bank Arena • Hamden, Connecticut	ESPN+	Marinov	W 4–1	3,625	20–9–2 (14–4–1)
February 22	7:00 pm	Brown	#14	M&T Bank Arena • Hamden, Connecticut	ESPN+	Silverstein	W 4–0	3,335	21–9–2 (15–4–1)
February 28	7:00 pm	at #19 Clarkson	#13	Cheel Arena • Potsdam, New York	ESPN+	Silverstein	L 3–4 ^{OT}	2,834	21–10–2 (15–5–1)
March 1	7:00 pm	at St. Lawrence	#13	Appleton Arena • Canton, New York	ESPN+	Marinov	W 4–0	1,302	22–10–2 (16–5–1)
ECAC Hockey Tournament
March 14	7:00 pm	Brown*	#13	M&T Bank Arena • Hamden, Connecticut (ECAC Quarterfinal Game 1)	ESPN+	Marinov	W 4–1	2,512	23–10–2
March 15	4:00 pm	Brown*	#13	M&T Bank Arena • Hamden, Connecticut (ECAC Quarterfinal Game 2)	ESPN+	Marinov	W 4–0	2,772	24–10–2
March 21	4:00 pm	vs. Cornell*	#12	Herb Brooks Arena • Lake Placid, New York (ECAC Semifinal)	ESPN+	Marinov	L 2–3 ^{OT}	5,320	24–11–2
NCAA Tournament
March 28	5:00 pm	vs. #7 Connecticut*	#11	PPL Center • Allentown, Pennsylvania (Regional Semifinal)	ESPNU	Silverstein	L 1–4		24–12–2
*Non-conference game. ^{#}Rankings from USCHO.com Poll. All times are in Eastern Time. Source:

== NCAA tournament ==
March 28, 2025; 5:00 pm	(2) Connecticut	4–1 (2–0, 1–1, 1–0)	(3) Quinnipiac	PPL Center; Attendance: 7,358

Game reference

Callum Tung
Goalies
Dylan Silverstein
Referees:
Brendan Blanchard
Ryan Sweeney
Linesmen:
Brendan Lewis
Joe Sherman

(Heaslip, Carabin) Hugh Larkin (3) – 08:25	1–0
(unassisted) Ethan Gardula (8) – GW – 14:32	2–0
	2–1	30:11 – Jeremy Wilmer (15) (Marcellus, Leddy)
(Percival, Spetz) Tristan Fraser (4) – 34:13	3–1
(Messineo) Joey Muldowney (28) – EN – 57:45	4–1

6 min
Penalties
4 min
22
Shots
22

Game summary
The start of the game saw Cooper Moore get crosschecked to the ice and then slide into his goal post but he was able to skate away without injury. The two teams were skating fast to start but both seemed to be trying to force the play a bit on offense and failed to connect on their opportunities. The first good chance came then Quinnipiac coughed up the puck behind their net but Dylan Silverstein was able to make the save on Tristan Fraser. The two teams skated up and down the ice for the next several minutes but produced very few shots on goal. Near the middle of the period, the Bobcats turned the puck over at their blueline and UConn was able to set up in the zone. After missing on their first chance, Hugh Larkin fired the puck top corner for Connecticut's first ever NCAA tournament goal. On the following attack, UConn was nearly able to double the lead but did end up forcing Travis Treloar into taking a slashing penalty. Quinnipiac's remade penalty kill was effective in keeping the Huskies to the outside and didn't give up a scoring chance on the disadvantage. Connecticut was able to get better chances once they were back at even strength but Silverstein was able to keep the puck out of the net. In the back half of the period, the Bobcat offense began to show signs of life but couldn't get much of a chance on the goal. Near the 5-minute mark, Quinnipiac made another mistake at its own blueline. Ethan Gardula was able to skate in alone and backhand the puck over the outstretched leg of Silverstein for the second goal of the match. After Quinnipiac was able to work the puck down low in the final minutes, Jake Richard was called for crosschecking to give the Bobcats their first power play of the game. With the #1 power play in the nation, Quinnipiac took the chance to get their first real scoring opportunity of the game but UConn's defense was able to prevent any further shots from getting on goal. Though they failed to score, the Bobcats' offense looked far better in the remaining few seconds and headed into the first intermission with momentum if nothing else.

The Huskies took control at the start of the second and Hudson Schandor had an open look right in front of the goal but Silverstein made the glove save. Kaden Shahan had another solo rush about a minute later but the puck rolled and he could only get a weak shot on goal. Quinnipiac tried to counter but they were unable to break through the UConn defense. Poor passing by the Bobcats did not help their efforts but Quinnipiac did eventually settle down and start to generate zone time in the Husky end. Connecticut battled back and kept the play mostly even until Jeremy Wilmer gloved the puck off of the faceoff and was handed a minor for the violation. It didn't take long for UConn to get a good chance at a goal but Silverstein's left toe made the stop on Richard. Just after the power play expired, UConn made a mistake just inside the Quinnipiac zone and gave up a 2-on-1 to the Bobcats Mason Marcellus made a brilliant backhand pass to Wilmer who lifted the puck over a sprawling Callum Tung to cut the lead in half. After a rush up the ice by Victor Czerneckianair, the two teams began to show some genuine dislike with some post-whistle roughhousing. While Quinnipiac looked like they had rediscovered their game, the team made a critical mistake when they turned over the puck down low. UConn fired the puck in from the point and it eventually found Fraser right in front of the goal who fired it past a helpless Silverstein to restore their lead. After the following faceoff, Quinnipiac went back on the attack and drew a penalty when John Spetz chopped down Elliott Groenewold's stick. UConn's penalty kill gave Quinnipiac fits, not only stopping the Bobcats from getting a good shot on goal but threatening to the Quinnipiac cage on more than one occasion. The Bobcats had better chances after their power play ended but they were unable to score again and ended the second still needing two goals.

Connecticut continued to press in the offensive zone from the start of the third. While they didn't get much in the way of scoring chances, their presence in the Bobcats' zone prevented Quinnipiac from getting their offense going. Eventually Jack Ricketts skated the puck up the ice and soon thereafter Wilmer briefly looked to have scored his second of the game but the puck hit the crossbar, bounced down behind Tung and was cleared by Viking Gustafsson Nyberg before it could roll into the goal. After the near-miss, Quinnipiac continued to probe away at the UConn defenses but the Huskies didn't give up any easy opportunities. Eventually, however, the constant attacking by the Bobcats resulted in Fraser taking an interference penalty. Quinnipiac's power play continued to have trouble finding a clear lane to the net and after a few turnovers again gave up the best chance to the Huskies. Just after the power play ended, Moore was tripped near the UConn net and kicked Tung in the head as he was going down. The netminder went down and was stunned momentarily but was able to continue after an injury stoppage. He was then immediately threatened after a UConn turnover but managed to made a glove save to preserve the 2-goal lead. Quinnipiac tried desperately to get something going offensively in the final 8 minutes but Connecticut refused to give an inch. With less then 4 minutes to play the Bobcats were finally able to get through to the UConn cage and nearly able to break through on a goal mouth scramble but Tung and the Husky defense held them back. Silverstein was pulled early for an extra attacker and the Bobcats were finally able to get something going when they had an additional player. With just over 2 minutes to play, Joey Muldowney cleared the puck down the ice. The disk was rolling, got on edge and curled into the Bobcat net to essentially end the match. The final seconds passed with both teams coming to that realization and it was UConn who could decisively claim the championship of the nutmeg state.

== Scoring statistics ==
Name	Position	Games	Goals	Assists	Points	PIM
Jeremy Wilmer	LW	38	15	26	41	4
Mason Marcellus	C	38	10	28	38	28
Travis Treloar	C	38	16	20	36	4
Andon Cerbone	F	38	15	20	35	16
Aaron Schwartz	F	38	12	18	30	2
Jack Ricketts	C	38	20	7	27	47
Tyler Borgula	RW	38	12	13	25	20
Christopher Pelosi	C	38	13	11	24	10
Davis Pennington	D	38	1	16	17	20
Victor Czerneckianair	C	38	7	9	16	21
Aaron Bohlinger	D	32	3	11	14	4
Cooper Moore	D	37	1	13	14	16
Elliott Groenewold	D	38	4	8	12	18
Charlie Leddy	D	37	1	10	11	12
Ryan Smith	RW	34	2	3	5	21
Alex Power	C	23	1	3	4	0
Drew Hockley	D	23	1	3	4	6
Braden Blace	D	28	1	2	3	4
Anthony Cipollone	F	38	0	3	3	9
Matthew McGroarty	F	20	0	2	2	2
Nate Benoit	D	24	0	2	2	4
Matej Marinov	G	17	0	1	1	0
Chase Ramsay	D	3	0	0	0	0
Noah Eyre	F	5	0	0	0	0
Noah Altman	G	3	0	0	0	0
Dylan Silverstein	G	24	0	0	0	0
Bench	–	–	–	–	–	10
Total			135	231	366	287

== Goaltending statistics ==
Name	Games	Minutes	Wins	Losses	Ties	Goals against	Saves	Shut outs	SV %	GAA
Noah Altman	3	7:44	0	0	0	0	2	0	1.000	0.00
Matej Marinov	17	889:19	12	3	0	26	334	3	.928	1.75
Dylan Silverstein	24	1412:06	12	9	2	53	492	2	.903	2.25
Empty Net	-	15:24	-	-	-	4	-	-	-	-
Total	38	2332:17	24	12	2	83	830	5	.909	2.14

== Rankings ==
Poll	Week																											
Poll	Pre	1	2	3	4	5	6	7	8	9	10	11	12	13	14	15	16	17	18	19	20	21	22	23	24	25	26	27 (Final)
USCHO.com	8	8	7	11	14	15	19	18	18	18	18	18	–	18	20	16	15	14	14	15	14	13	13	13	12	11	-	15
USA Hockey	7	8	8	10	13	15	RV	18	18	18	16	18	–	17	18	15	15	14	14	14	14	12	12	12	11	12	14	13

Note: USCHO did not release a poll in week 12 or 26.
Note: USA Hockey did not release a poll in week 12.

== Awards and honors ==
Player	Award	Ref
Jack Ricketts	ECAC Hockey Best Defensive Forward	
Mason Marcellus	All-ECAC Hockey Second Team	
Jack Ricketts	All-ECAC Hockey Second Team	

== 2025 NHL entry draft ==
Round	Pick	Player	NHL team
5	144	Ethan Wyttenbach ^{†}	Calgary Flames
7	207	Matthew Lansing ^{†}	Vancouver Canucks

† incoming freshman
