= 2025–26 NCAA Division I men's ice hockey season =

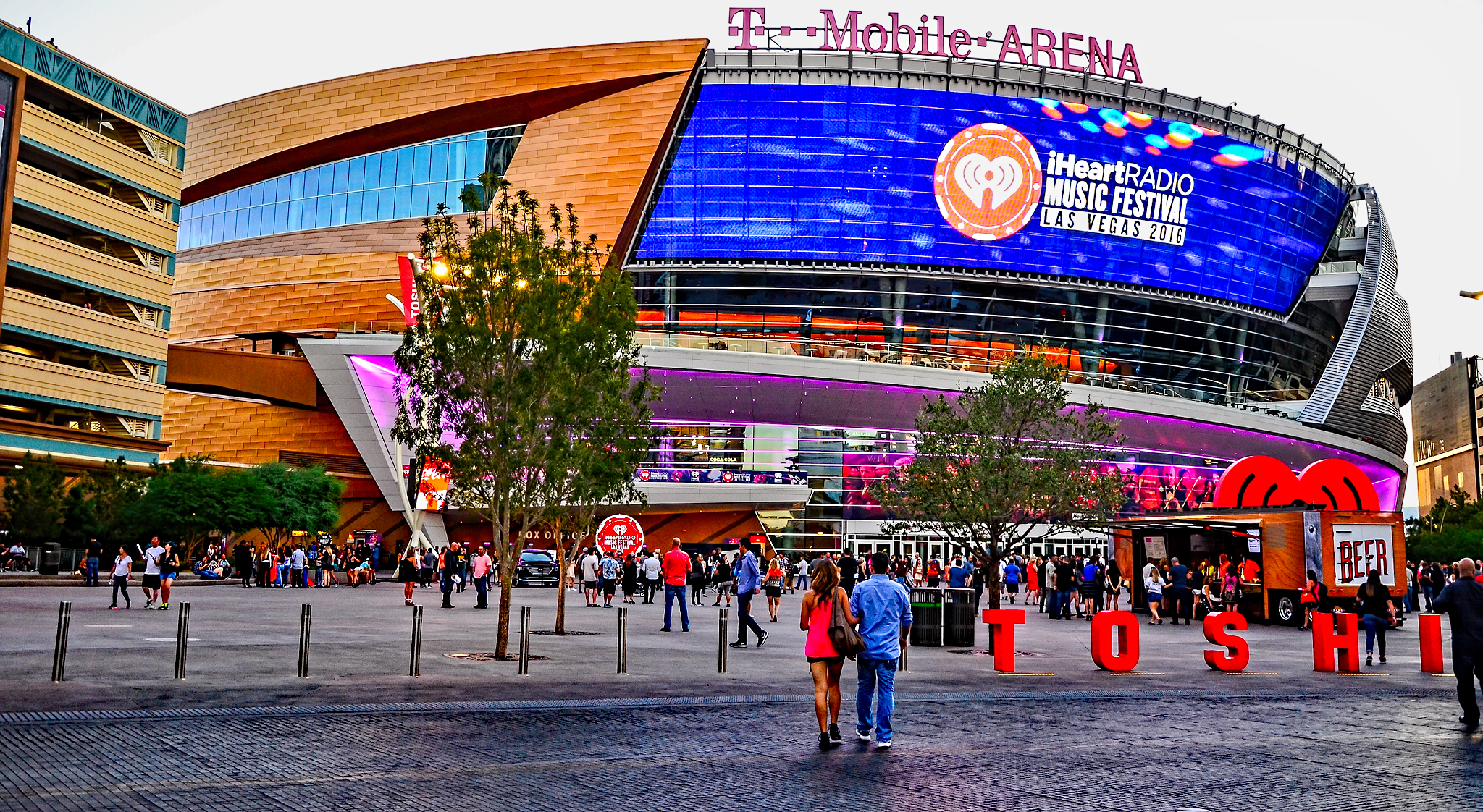
- T-Mobile Arena on the Las Vegas Strip hosted the 2026 Frozen Four.
- Duration: October 3, 2025– April 11, 2026
- NCAA tournament: 2026
- National championship: T-Mobile Arena; Las Vegas, Nevada
- NCAA champion: Denver Pioneers
- Hobey Baker Award: Max Plante (Minnesota Duluth)

The 2025–26 NCAA Division I men's ice hockey season began on October 3, 2025, and concluded with the NCAA championship on April 11, 2026. This was the 78th season in which an NCAA ice hockey championship was held and US college hockey's 132nd year overall.

This season was only the second time in history that the NCAA championship was held in the Pacific Time Zone. The first occurred in 1999 when the finals were held in Anaheim, California.

== Eligibility rules ==
In September of 2024, Arizona State received a commitment from a Canadian Hockey League player when Braxton Whitehead agreed to join the program for the 2025-26 season. Due to the new student athlete compensation rules the NCAA was forced to implement, major-junior players could no longer be excluded for having received a financial stipend during their tenure in the three CHL leagues. As a result, it took less than two months for the NCAA to remove the long-standing prohibition and allow former major-junior players to play college hockey in the United States once more.

== Program downgrade ==
During the previous season, American International announced that they would be downgrading their program to Division II beginning with this season.

== Delayed start ==
In July, Tennessee State, which had originally planned on playing their first varsity games this season, announced that they would be pushing back the start of the program until 2026–27.

== Mercyhurst ==
Three weeks after Mercyhurst was eliminated from their conference tournament, the university announced that they were terminating their men's ice hockey program effective immediately. Mercyhurst and American International had two of the worst attendance figures for Division I programs over the past several years.

== Regular season ==
=== Season tournaments ===
Names	Dates	Location	Teams	Champion	Runner-up
Ice Breaker Tournament	October 10–11, 2025	Mullett Arena (Tempe, Arizona)	4	Arizona State	Notre Dame
Adirondack Winter Invitational	November 28–29, 2025	Herb Brooks Arena (Lake Placid, New York)	4	Alaska	Clarkson
Friendship Four	November 28–29, 2025	SSE Arena Belfast (Belfast, Northern Ireland)	4	Miami	Union
Holiday Face–Off	December 27–28, 2025	Fiserv Forum (Milwaukee, Wisconsin)	4	Western Michigan	Wisconsin
Great Lakes Invitational	December 28–29, 2025	Van Andel Arena (Grand Rapids, Michigan)	4	Michigan State	Michigan Tech
Coachella Valley Cactus Cup	January 2–3, 2026	Acrisure Arena (Thousand Palms, California)	4	St. Cloud State	Massachusetts Lowell
Desert Hockey Classic	January 2–3, 2026	Mullett Arena (Tempe, Arizona)	4	Arizona State	Air Force
Connecticut Ice	January 23–24, 2026	Ingalls Rink (New Haven, Connecticut)	4	Connecticut	Quinnipiac
Beanpot	February 2, 9 2026	TD Garden (Boston, Massachusetts)	4	Boston College	Boston University

=== Standings ===
2025–26 Atlantic Hockey America Standings
	Conference record										Overall record					
	GP	W	L	T	OW	OL	SW	PTS	GF	GA	GP	W	L	T	GF	GA
#20 Bentley †*	26	16	6	4	1	0	2	53	85	56	40	23	12	5	122	94
Sacred Heart	26	15	8	3	1	0	1	48	80	61	40	23	14	3	118	96
Robert Morris	26	13	11	2	0	2	2	45	69	69	40	16	21	3	103	128
Holy Cross	26	14	10	2	1	1	1	45	81	69	38	18	18	2	113	116
RIT	26	13	11	2	2	1	2	42	69	68	36	17	17	2	93	96
Air Force	26	13	10	3	2	1	0	41	75	73	37	18	15	4	108	112
Canisius	26	12	12	2	1	0	2	39	81	74	35	17	16	2	107	105
Niagara	26	9	16	1	1	3	0	30	67	83	37	13	23	1	93	118
Army	26	7	15	4	2	3	2	28	61	75	35	12	17	6	91	96
Mercyhurst	26	5	18	3	0	0	1	19	47	87	37	6	28	3	65	143
Championship: March 21, 2026 † indicates conference regular season champion (DeGregorio Trophy) * indicates conference tournament champion (Riley Trophy); Rankings: USCHO.com Top 20 Poll; updated April 15, 2026; Source: AHA

2025–26 Big Ten ice hockey Standings
	Conference record										Overall record					
	GP	W	L	T	OTW	OTL	3/SW	PTS	GF	GA	GP	W	L	T	GF	GA
#5 Michigan State †	24	16	6	2	2	2	1	51	88	54	37	26	9	2	136	79
#3 Michigan *	24	17	6	1	4	0	1	49	96	66	40	31	8	1	181	96
#11 Penn State	24	12	10	2	1	3	1	41	86	82	37	21	14	2	136	117
#2 Wisconsin	24	14	10	0	3	0	0	39	95	84	39	24	13	2	142	115
Ohio State	24	8	15	1	1	5	0	29	78	100	37	14	21	2	119	134
Minnesota	24	7	15	2	0	2	2	27	61	79	36	11	22	3	97	125
Notre Dame	24	5	17	2	3	2	0	12	65	104	37	9	23	5	103	151
Championship: March 21, 2026 † indicates conference regular season champion * indicates conference tournament champion Rankings: USCHO.com Top 20 Poll; updated April 15, 2026

2025–26 Central Collegiate Hockey Association standings
	Conference record										Overall record					
	GP	W	L	T	OTW	OTL	SW	PTS	GF	GA	GP	W	L	T	GF	GA
#14 Minnesota State †*	26	14	7	5	1	2	3	51	71	53	40	22	11	7	111	81
#18 St. Thomas	26	15	7	4	2	1	2	50	89	67	38	21	12	5	131	109
#17 Augustana	26	14	8	4	1	2	3	50	72	49	37	22	11	4	109	74
Michigan Tech	26	16	7	3	3	1	0	49	84	59	39	23	13	3	126	106
Bowling Green	26	15	7	4	3	2	1	49	80	59	36	18	11	7	107	88
Bemidji State	26	11	11	4	5	1	3	36	69	68	36	13	19	4	98	103
Lake Superior State	26	8	16	2	1	4	2	31	57	83	36	11	22	3	92	121
Ferris State	26	6	18	2	1	2	1	22	70	100	37	8	27	2	91	138
Northern Michigan	26	3	21	2	0	2	0	13	44	98	34	3	29	2	56	132
Championship: March 20, 2026 † indicates conference regular-season champion (MacNaughton Cup) * indicates conference tournament champion (Mason Cup); Rankings: USCHO.com Top 20 Poll; updated March 22, 2026; Source: CCHA

2025–26 NCAA Division I Independent ice hockey standings
	Overall record					
	GP	W	L	T	GF	GA
Alaska*	33	15	15	3	96	99
Alaska Anchorage	33	5	27	1	57	134
Lindenwood	30	15	15	0	105	114
Long Island	33	14	18	1	105	112
Stonehill	35	10	22	3	88	118
Championship: March 7, 2026 * indicates tournament champion Rankings: USCHO.com Top 20 Poll

2025–26 ECAC Hockey Standings
	Conference record										Overall record					
	GP	W	L	T	OTW	OTL	SW	PTS	GF	GA	GP	W	L	T	GF	GA
#8 Quinnipiac †	22	17	4	1	2	0	0	50	102	48	40	27	10	3	162	95
#10 Dartmouth *	22	13	5	4	0	1	3	47	81	53	35	23	8	4	125	75
#12 Cornell	22	15	6	1	1	1	1	47	71	42	34	22	11	1	109	69
Princeton	22	11	9	2	0	1	1	37	63	57	34	18	13	3	103	90
Union	22	11	9	2	1	1	1	36	71	68	37	22	12	3	140	98
Harvard	22	11	10	1	0	1	0	35	61	64	34	16	16	2	92	100
Colgate	22	9	10	3	2	0	2	30	68	74	37	13	20	4	99	125
Clarkson	22	9	10	3	2	0	1	29	65	65	38	18	17	3	111	111
Rensselaer	22	8	13	1	0	1	0	26	55	70	35	11	23	1	80	115
Yale	22	7	14	1	2	2	0	22	63	80	31	8	22	1	79	115
St. Lawrence	22	6	15	1	0	0	1	20	59	99	35	7	25	3	85	151
Brown	22	4	16	2	0	2	1	17	44	83	31	5	24	2	63	119
Championship: March 21, 2026 † indicates conference regular season champion (Cleary Cup) * indicates conference tournament champion (Whitelaw Cup); Rankings: USCHO.com Top 20 Poll; updated April 15, 2026

2025–26 Hockey East Standings
	Conference record										Overall record					
	GP	W	L	T	OTW	OTL	SW	PTS	GF	GA	GP	W	L	T	GF	GA
#9 Providence †	24	18	5	1	2	1	0	54	86	46	36	23	11	2	120	82
#16 Massachusetts	24	14	9	1	2	1	1	43	63	53	36	22	13	1	101	83
#13 Connecticut	24	12	9	3	1	1	2	41	73	59	38	20	13	5	116	90
#19 Boston College	24	13	11	0	1	1	2	39	69	59	36	20	15	1	116	92
Maine	24	12	11	1	3	2	0	36	76	79	35	18	14	3	116	96
Boston University	24	12	12	0	3	2	0	35	69	74	36	17	17	2	105	110
Northeastern	24	11	13	0	1	3	0	35	67	62	36	17	18	1	98	91
#15 Merrimack *	24	10	12	2	0	1	1	34	68	75	39	21	16	2	121	110
Massachusetts Lowell	24	9	15	0	1	2	0	28	66	80	35	13	22	0	91	114
New Hampshire	24	8	15	1	0	0	1	26	41	73	35	14	20	1	68	105
Vermont	24	8	15	1	0	0	0	25	55	83	35	13	21	1	73	115
Championship: March 21, 2026 † indicates regular season champion * indicates conference tournament champion (Lamoriello Trophy); Rankings: USCHO Division I Men's Poll; updated April 15, 2026

2025–26 National Collegiate Hockey Conference Standings
	Conference record										Overall record					
	GP	W	L	T	OTW	OTL	SW	PTS	GF	GA	GP	W	L	T	GF	GA
#4 North Dakota †	24	17	6	1	1	4	0	55	96	58	40	29	10	1	151	90
#1 Denver *	24	17	6	1	2	1	1	52	82	51	43	29	11	3	154	90
#6 Western Michigan	24	16	7	1	3	1	1	48	89	65	39	27	11	1	140	95
#7 Minnesota Duluth	24	11	12	1	3	4	1	36	64	66	40	24	15	1	130	99
St. Cloud State	24	9	14	1	1	2	1	30	63	86	36	16	19	1	112	112
Colorado College	24	7	11	6	2	3	1	29	63	66	36	13	17	6	95	98
Miami	24	9	13	2	3	1	1	28	60	74	36	18	16	2	104	108
Omaha	24	8	16	0	0	0	0	24	57	86	36	12	24	0	95	129
Arizona State	24	7	16	1	2	1	1	22	62	94	36	14	21	1	106	132
Championship: March 21, 2026 † indicates conference regular season champion (Penrose Cup) * indicates conference tournament champion (National Cup); Rankings: USCHO.com Top 20 Poll; updated April 13, 2026

== Postseason ==
=== Main tournament ===
Regional Semifinals; March 26–27
1	Michigan (1)	5
4	Bentley	1
Albany – MVP Arena – Fri/Sun
2	Minnesota Duluth	3
3	Penn State	1
1	Western Michigan (4)	3
4	Minnesota State	1
Loveland – Blue Arena – Fri/Sun
2	Denver	5
3	Cornell	0
1	North Dakota (2)	3
4	Merrimack	0
Sioux Falls – Denny Sanford Premier Center – Thu/Sat
2	Providence	2
3	Quinnipiac	5
1	Michigan State (3)	2
4	Connecticut	1
Worcester – DCU Center – Thu/Sat
2	Dartmouth	1
3	Wisconsin	5

Regional Finals; March 28–29
1	Michigan (1)	4
2	Minnesota Duluth	3
1	Western Michigan (4)	2
2	Denver	6
1	North Dakota (2)	5
3	Quinnipiac	0
1	Michigan State (3)	3
3	Wisconsin	4*

National Semifinals; April 9
A1	Michigan (1)	3
L2	Denver	4**
SF1	North Dakota (2)	1
W3	Wisconsin	2

National Championship; April 11
L2	Denver	2
W3	Wisconsin	1

Number in parentheses denotes overall seed in the tournament.
* denotes overtime period

=== Independent tournament ===
In May 2025, the five active independent Division I teams (Alaska, Alaska Anchorage, Lindenwood, Long Island and Stonehill) came to an agreement about a hosting a postseason tournament beginning with this season. The series, which was named the "United Collegiate Hockey Cup", held its inaugural meet from March 5–7, 2026 and was hosted by Lindenwood and the Centene Community Ice Center. The series was born in part due to a few teams (notably Alaska in 2023) losing ground in the national ranking during the conference playoffs and missing out on at-large bids to the NCAA tournament. The schools also wanted a forum to showcase their programs on a larger scale which could help improve both recruiting and fundraising.

== NPI Rankings ==
During the previous season, the NCAA announced that they would stop using the PairWise rankings for determining at-large bids to the NCAA tournament in favor of the NCAA Power Index (NPI).

Just prior to the start of the season, the methodology was announced as follows:

- Win percentage / Strength of Schedule – 25%/75%
- Home-Away Win/Loss – 1.2/0.8 (regular season), 1.0/1.0 (postseason)
- Quality Win Base – 51
- Quality Win Multiplier – 0.5
- Overtime – 60/40 (regular season), 100/0 (postseason)
- Minimum Wins – 12

The final criteria, minimum wins, refers to the number of wins that must be retained in a team's ranking. According to the new system, games that are rated as being below a certain value threshold (e.g. defeating a club 40 places lower in the rankings) are removed from the calculations in order to prevent the numbers from becoming too skewed. Rather than being rewarded or punished for losing to a far stronger or defeating a far inferior opponent, the game is simply not counted in the rankings for one or both teams.

As part of the change, the NCAA selection committee eliminated several criteria that had been use by the PairWise: Ratings Points Index (a measurement of success against opponents weighted by strength of schedule), common opponents and head-to-head matches. Additionally, the committee did not retain the requirement that the teams must have at least a .500 record in order to be considered for an at-large bid.

NCAA Division I Men's Hockey NPI Rankings
Rank	Team	NPI	SOS	QWB	Conference
1	Michigan	59.193*	53.081	0.902	Big Ten
2	Denver	58.579*	52.958	0.931	NCHC
3	North Dakota	58.469*	52.108	0.634	NCHC
4	Michigan State	57.918*	52.362	0.813	Big Ten
5	Western Michigan	57.642	53.202	0.706	NCHC
6	Minnesota Duluth	56.173	53.508	0.580	NCHC
7	Wisconsin	55.958	53.565	0.810	Big Ten
8	Dartmouth	55.545	49.362	0.200	ECAC Hockey
9	Providence	55.512	51.769	0.374	Hockey East
10	Quinnipiac	55.249	50.472	0.308	ECAC Hockey
11	Penn State	55.159	52.991	0.498	Big Ten
12	Cornell	54.669	50.400	0.223	ECAC Hockey
13	Minnesota State	54.027	49.764	0.340	CCHA
14	Augustana	54.014	49.727	0.282	CCHA
15	St. Thomas	53.874	51.211	0.310	CCHA
16	Connecticut	53.741	51.649	0.337	Hockey East
17	Massachusetts	53.658	51.110	0.298	Hockey East
18	Boston College	53.231	51.718	0.235	Hockey East
19	Michigan Tech	53.000	49.749	0.229	CCHA
20	Ohio State	52.980	53.658	0.693	Big Ten
21	Princeton	52.935	50.182	0.298	ECAC Hockey
22	Merrimack	52.898	51.065	0.279	Hockey East
23	Bowling Green	52.661	50.043	0.323	CCHA
24	Maine	52.546	51.966	0.454	Hockey East
25	Bentley	52.464	49.257	0.065	AHA
26	Union	52.188	48.924	0.160	ECAC Hockey
27	St. Cloud State	52.030	53.105	0.453	NCHC
28	Northeastern	51.896	51.547	0.381	Hockey East
29	Boston University	51.815	52.182	0.329	Hockey East
30	Colorado College	51.749	53.501	0.467	NCHC
31	Sacred Heart	51.745	49.112	0.061	AHA
32	Miami	51.699	52.456	0.166	NCHC
33	Harvard	51.301	50.895	0.173	ECAC Hockey
34	Clarkson	50.763	50.706	0.407	ECAC Hockey
35	Alaska	50.599	50.011	0.221	Independent
36	Lindenwood	50.587	49.886	0.111	Independent
37	Air Force	50.533	49.814	0.183	AHA
38	Holy Cross	50.331	49.957	0.076	AHA
39	Minnesota	50.310	54.831	0.656	Big Ten
40	Arizona State	49.847	54.018	0.413	NCHC
41	New Hampshire	49.592	52.412	0.394	Hockey East
42	Omaha	49.578	54.270	0.359	NCHC
43	Long Island	49.405	48.868	0.067	Independent
44	RIT	49.041	48.870	0.048	AHA
45	Army	48.677	49.855	0.106	AHA
46	Robert Morris	48.570	49.217	0.017	AHA
47	Massachusetts Lowell	48.521	51.547	0.222	Hockey East
48	Canisius	48.335	48.080	0.000	AHA
49	Bemidji State	48.323	51.336	0.268	CCHA
50	Colgate	48.192	50.619	0.172	ECAC Hockey
51	Notre Dame	48.108	54.275	0.242	Big Ten
52	Vermont	47.735	51.463	0.189	Hockey East
53	Lake Superior State	47.513	50.259	0.135	CCHA
54	Rensselaer	46.657	50.418	0.079	ECAC Hockey
55	Ferris State	45.894	52.105	0.246	CCHA
56	Niagara	45.890	48.952	0.067	AHA
57	Stonehill	45.399	49.261	0.037	Independent
58	Yale	44.807	50.850	0.136	ECAC Hockey
59	Brown	43.857	50.653	0.133	ECAC Hockey
60	Northern Michigan	43.232^	52.050	0.113	CCHA
61	St. Lawrence	43.065	49.868	0.024	ECAC Hockey
62	Alaska Anchorage	42.864^	50.338	0.120	Independent
63	Mercyhurst	42.623^	50.285	0.013	AHA
* A team's NPI has been adjusted to remove negative effect from defeating a weak opponent^ A team's NPI has been adjusted to remove positive effects from losing to a strong opponent Note: A team's record is based only on games against other Division I hockey schools which are eligible for the NCAA Tournament; Updated April 13, 2026

== Player stats ==
=== Scoring leaders ===
Player	Class	Team	GP	G	A	Pts	PIM
Ethan Wyttenbach	Freshman	Quinnipiac	40	25	34	59	20
T. J. Hughes	Senior	Michigan	40	22	35	57	22
Max Plante	Sophomore	Minnesota Duluth	40	25	27	52	23
Michael Hage	Sophomore	Michigan	39	13	39	52	14
Zam Plante	Sophomore	Minnesota Duluth	40	20	31	51	2
Gavin McKenna	Freshman	Penn State	35	15	36	51	36
Porter Martone	Freshman	Michigan State	35	25	25	50	78
Hayden Stavroff	Sophomore	Dartmouth	35	29	19	48	34
Félix Trudeau	Senior	Sacred Heart	39	25	23	48	87
James Hagens	Sophomore	Boston College	34	23	24	47	24

As of April 9, 2026

=== Goaltending leaders ===
The following goaltenders lead the NCAA in goals against average, minimum 1/3 of team's minutes played.
GP = Games played; Min = Minutes played; W = Wins; L = Losses; T = Ties; GA = Goals against; SO = Shutouts; SV% = Save percentage; GAA = Goals against average

Player	Class	Team	GP	Min	W	L	T	GA	SO	SV%	GAA
Johnny Hicks	Freshman	Denver	21	1112:56	16	0	1	22	3	.957	1.19
Alex Tracy	Senior	Minnesota State	39	2365:05	21	11	7	71	5	.927	1.80
Jan Špunar	Freshman	North Dakota	27	1602:15	20	5	1	51	6	.919	1.91
Emmett Croteau	Junior	Dartmouth	24	1464:32	15	5	4	47	2	.922	1.93
Michael Hrabal	Junior	Massachusetts	29	1721:06	19	9	1	56	4	.937	1.95
Josh Kotai	Junior	Augustana	35	2111:36	20	11	4	70	5	.938	1.99
Jack Parsons	Freshman	Providence	19	1084:31	13	5	0	37	2	.922	2.05
Alexis Cournoyer	Freshman	Cornell	28	1636:18	18	10	0	56	1	.915	2.05
Ajeet Gundarah	Sophomore	Sacred Heart	22	1260:57	13	7	1	44	2	.928	2.09
Dylan Silverstein	Sophomore	Quinnipiac	18	975:43	10	6	1	34	2	.912	2.09

As of April 11, 2026

== Awards ==
=== NCAA ===
Award		Recipient
Hobey Baker Award		Max Plante, Minnesota Duluth
Spencer Penrose Award		Reid Cashman, Dartmouth
Tim Taylor Award		Ethan Wyttenbach, Quinnipiac
Mike Richter Award		Trey Augustine, Michigan State
Derek Hines Unsung Hero Award		Kevin Anderson, Princeton
Tournament Most Outstanding Player		Johnny Hicks, Denver
AHCA All-American Teams
East First Team	Position	West First Team
Michael Hrabal, UMass	G	Trey Augustine, Michigan State
Brandon Holt, Maine	D	Jake Livanavage, North Dakota
Cole Hutson, Boston University	D	Eric Pohlkamp, Denver
James Hagens, Boston College	F	T.J. Hughes, Michigan
Hayden Stavroff, Dartmouth	F	Porter Martone, Michigan State
Ethan Wyttenbach, Quinnipiac	F	Max Plante, Minnesota Duluth
East Second Team	Position	West Second Team
Lawton Zacher, Northeastern	G	Josh Kotai, Augustana
Tyler Dunbar, Union	D	Ty Hanson, Minnesota Duluth
Chris Hedden, Air Force	D	Evan Murr, Minnesota State
Dylan Hryckowian, Northeastern	F	Tyson Gross, St. Cloud State
Jack Musa, Massachusetts	F	Gavin McKenna, Penn State
Felix Trudeau, Sacred Heart	F	Charlie Stramel, Michigan State

=== Atlantic Hockey America ===
Award		Recipient
Player of the Year		Félix Trudeau, Sacred Heart
Forward of the Year		Félix Trudeau, Sacred Heart
Best Defenseman		Chris Hedden, Air Force
Goaltender of the Year		J. J. Cataldo, Army
Best Defensive Forward		Kellan Hjartarson, Bentley
Rookie of the Year		Zach Wigle, RIT
Individual Sportsmanship Award		Mack Oliphant, Holy Cross
Coach of the Year		Andy Jones, Bentley
Tournament Most Outstanding Player		Michael Mesic, Bentley
All-Atlantic Hockey America Teams
First Team	Position	Second Team
J. J. Cataldo, Army	G	Jakub Krbecek, RIT
Chris Hedden, Air Force	D	Mack Oliphant, Holy Cross
Mikey Adamson, Sacred Heart	D	Dominic Elliott, Robert Morris
Félix Trudeau, Sacred Heart	F	Tanner Klimpke, Robert Morris
Jack Stockfish, Holy Cross	F	Jack Ivey, Army
Jake Black, Bentley	F	Stephen Castagna, Bentley
Third Team	Position	Rookie Team
Dominik Wasik, Air Force	G	Lukas Swedin, Bentley
Jack Dalton, Bentley	D	F. J. Buteau, Canisius
Nolan Cunningham, Air Force	D	John Babcock, Robert Morris
Grant Porter, Canisius	F	Zach Wigle, RIT
Walter Zacher, Canisius	F	Evan Konyen, RIT
Killian Kiecker-Olson, Canisius	F	Maxim Muranov, Niagra

=== Big Ten ===
Award		Recipient
Player of the Year		T. J. Hughes, Michigan
Defensive Player of the Year		Matt Basgall, Michigan State
Goaltender of the Year		Trey Augustine, Michigan State
Freshman of the Year		Gavin McKenna, Penn State
Scoring Champion		Gavin McKenna, Penn State
Coach of the Year		Adam Nightingale, Michigan State
Tournament Most Outstanding Player		T. J. Hughes, Michigan
All-Big Ten Teams
First Team	Position	Second Team
Trey Augustine, Michigan State	G	Jack Ivankovic, Michigan
Matt Basgall, Michigan State	D	Tyler Duke, Michigan
Ben Dexheimer, Wisconsin	D	Jackson Smith, Penn State
T. J. Hughes, Michigan	F	Michael Hage, Michigan
Porter Martone, Michigan State	F	Brodie Ziemer, Minnesota
Charlie Stramel, Michigan State	F	Gavin McKenna, Penn State
Freshman Team	Position	
Jack Ivankovic, Michigan	G	
Jackson Smith, Penn State	D	
Luke Osburn, Wisconsin	D	
Porter Martone, Michigan State	F	
Jake Karabela, Ohio State	F	
Gavin McKenna, Penn State	F	

=== CCHA ===
Award		Recipient
Player of the Year		Josh Kotai, Augustana
Forward of the Year		Stiven Sardarian, Michigan Tech
Defenseman of the Year		Evan Murr, Minnesota State
Goaltender of the Year		Josh Kotai, Augustana
Rookie of the Year		Lucas Van Vliet, St. Thomas
Defensive Defenseman of the Year		Jack Anderson, Michigan Tech
Defensive Forward of the Year		Lucas Wahlin, St. Thomas
Coach of the Year		Luke Strand, Minnesota State
Tournament Most Valuable Player		Alex Tracy, Minnesota State
All-CCHA Teams
First Team	Position	Second Team
Josh Kotai, Augustana	G	Alex Tracy, Minnesota State
Jack Anderson, Michigan Tech	D	Chase Cheslock, St. Thomas
Evan Murr, Minnesota State	D	Breck McKinley, Bowling Green
Oliver Peer, Bemidji State	F	Max Koskipirtti, Michigan Tech
Stiven Sardarian, Michigan Tech	F	Tristan Lemyre, Minnesota State
Lucas Wahlin, St. Thomas	F	Lucas Van Vliet, St. Thomas
Rookie Team	Position	
Oliver Auyeung-Ashton, Northern Michigan	G	
Brayden Crampton, Bowling Green	D	
Hayes Hundley, St. Thomas	D	
Leo Bulgakov, Augustana	F	
Nathan Pilling, St. Thomas	F	
Lucas Van Vliet, St. Thomas	F	

=== ECAC Hockey ===
Award		Recipient
Player of the Year		Hayden Stavroff, Dartmouth
Best Defensive Forward		Jonathan Castagna, Cornell
Best Defensive Defenseman		Elliott Groenewold, Quinnipiac
Rookie of the Year		Ethan Wyttenbach, Quinnipiac
Ken Dryden Award		Alexis Cournoyer, Cornell
Student-Athlete of the Year		David Chen, Yale
Tim Taylor Award		Reid Cashman, Dartmouth
Most Outstanding Player in Tournament		Emmett Croteau, Dartmouth
All-ECAC Hockey Teams
First Team	Position	Second Team
Alexis Cournoyer, Cornell	G	Emmett Croteau, Dartmouth
Elliott Groenewold, Quinnipiac	D	Xavier Veilleux, Cornell
Tyler Dunbar, Union	D	Isaiah Norlin, Colgate
Jonathan Castagna, Cornell	F	Antonin Verreault, Quinnipiac
Ethan Wyttenbach, Quinnipiac	F	Brandon Buhr, Union
Hayden Stavroff, Dartmouth	F	Hank Cleaves, Dartmouth
Third Team	Position	Rookie Team
Arthur Smith, Princeton	G	Alexis Cournoyer, Cornell
C. J. Foley, Dartmouth	D	Thomas Klassek, Rensselaer
Matthew Morden, Harvard	D	Xavier Veilleux, Cornell
Kai Daniells, Princeton	F	Ethan Wyttenbach, Quinnipiac
Mason Marcellus, Quinnipiac	F	Antonin Verreault, Quinnipiac
Ryan Bottrill, Clarkson	F	Rasmus Svartstrom, St. Lawrence

=== Hockey East ===
Award		Recipient
Player of the Year		Michael Hrabal, Massachusetts
Best Defensive Forward		Tabor Heaslip, Connecticut
Best Defensive Defenseman		Brandon Holt, Maine
Rookie of the Year		Roger McQueen, Providence
Goaltending Champion		Michael Hrabal, Massachusetts
Len Ceglarski Award		Will Vote, Boston College
Three Stars Award		James Hagens, Boston College
Scoring Champion		James Hagens, Boston College
Charlie Holt Team Sportsmanship Award		Massachusetts
Bob Kullen Award (Coach of the Year)		Nate Leaman, Providence
William Flynn Tournament Most Valuable Player		Max Lundgren, Merrimack
All-Hockey East Teams
First Team	Position	Second Team
Michael Hrabal, Massachusetts	G	Lawton Zacher, Northeastern
Brandon Holt, Maine	D	Vinny Borgesi, Northeastern
Cole Hutson, Boston University	D	Larry Keenan, Boston University
James Hagens, Boston College	F	Joey Muldowney, Connecticut
Dylan Hryckowian, Northeastern	F	Jack Musa, Massachusetts
Josh Nadeau, Maine	F	Ryan Tattle, Connecticut
Third Team	Position	Rookie Team
Tyler Muszelik, Connecticut	G	Jack Parsons, Providence
Lukas Gustafsson, Boston College	D	Quinn Mantei, Providence
Gavin McCarthy, Boston University	D	Luka Radivojevic, Boston College
Tanner Adams, Providence	F	Justin Gill, Merrimack
Colin Kessler, Vermont	F	Parker Lalonde, Merrimack
Dean Letourneau, Boston College	F	Giacomo Martino, Northeastern
	F	Jacob Mathieu, Northeastern
	F	Roger McQueen, Providence

=== NCHC ===
Award		Recipient
Player of the Year		Max Plante, Minnesota Duluth
Forward of the Year		Max Plante, Minnesota Duluth
Goaltender of the Year		Jan Špunar, North Dakota
Rookie of the Year		Cole Reschny, North Dakota
Defensive Defenseman of the Year		Adam Kleber, Minnesota Duluth
Offensive Defenseman of the Year		Eric Pohlkamp, Denver
Defensive Forward of the Year		Tyson Gross, St. Cloud State
Scholar-Athlete of the Year		Kent Anderson, Denver
Three Stars Award		Hampton Slukynsky, Western Michigan
Sportsmanship Award		Blake Mesenburg, Miami
Herb Brooks Coach of the Year		Dane Jackson, North Dakota
Frozen Faceoff MVP		Johnny Hicks, Denver
All-NCHC Teams
First Team	Position	Second Team
Jan Špunar, North Dakota	G	Hampton Slukynsky, Western Michigan
Eric Pohlkamp, Denver	D	Abram Wiebe, North Dakota
Jake Livanavage, North Dakota	D	Ty Hanson, Minnesota Duluth
Max Plante, Minnesota Duluth	F	Bennett Schimek, Arizona State
Tyson Gross, St. Cloud State	F	Ben Strinden, North Dakota
Cruz Lucius, Arizona State	F	Austin Burnevik, St. Cloud State
Third Team	Position	Rookie Team
Matteo Drobac, Miami	G	Jan Špunar, North Dakota
Boston Buckberger, Denver	D	Keaton Verhoeff, North Dakota
Samuel Sjolund, Western Michigan	D	Eric Jamieson, Denver
Zam Plante, Minnesota Duluth	F	Cole Reschny, North Dakota
Grant Slukynsky, Western Michigan	F	Will Zellers, North Dakota
Ellis Rickwood, North Dakota	F	David Deputy, Miami

=== HCA ===
Month	Award	Recipient
October	Forward of the Month	Max Plante, Minnesota Duluth
October	Forward of the Month	JJ Wiebusch, Penn State
October	Defender of the Month	Cole Hutson, Boston University
October	Defender of the Month	Ben Robertson, Michigan
October	Goaltender of the Month	Lawton Zacher, Northeastern
October	Rookie of the Month	Gavin McKenna, Penn State
November	Forward of the Month	Will Horcoff, Michigan
November	Defender of the Month	Chris Hedden, Air Force
November	Defender of the Month	Ethan Wyttenbach, Quinnipiac
November	Goaltender of the Month	Emmett Croteau, Dartmouth
November	Rookie of the Month	Ethan Wyttenbach, Quinnipiac
December	Forward of the Month	Brett Meerman, Augustana
December	Forward of the Month	Justin Poirier, Maine
December	Defender of the Month	Jake Livanavage, North Dakota
December	Goaltender of the Month	Jack Ivankovic, Michigan
December	Rookie of the Month	Anthony Romani, Michigan State
January	Forward of the Month	Jake Black, Bentley
January	Defender of the Month	Jack Anderson, Michigan Tech
January	Goaltender of the Month	Michael Hrabal, Massachusetts
January	Rookie of the Month	Josh Fleming, Penn State
January	Rookie of the Month	Jack Parsons, Providence
February	Forward of the Month	Ethan Wyttenbach, Quinnipiac
February	Defender of the Month	Abram Wiebe, North Dakota
February	Goaltender of the Month	Michael Hrabal, Massachusetts
February	Rookie of the Month	Gavin McKenna, Penn State

== See also ==
- 2025–26 NCAA Division I women's ice hockey season
- 2025–26 NCAA Division II men's ice hockey season
- 2025–26 NCAA Division III men's ice hockey season
