= Tim Taylor Award (NCAA) =

For outstanding freshman in college ice hockey

Tim Taylor Award (National Rookie of the Year)
- Sport: Ice hockey
- Awarded for: The most outstanding freshman in NCAA Division I men's ice hockey.

History
- First award: 2006
- Most recent: Ethan Wyttenbach

The Tim Taylor Award is an award given out to the NCAA Division I player judged to be the most outstanding freshman. The annual award was first received by Andreas Nödl after the conclusion of the 2006–07 season.

Shortly after his succumbing to cancer, the NCAA renamed the 'National Rookie of the Year Award' after long-time Yale head coach Tim Taylor. Starting in 2013–14 the honor was renamed the 'Tim Taylor Award'. ECAC Hockey already confers an award with the same name, given each year to the conference Coach of the Year. It was renamed in Taylor's honor in 2007.

== Winners ==
| Year | Winner | Position | School |
|---|---|---|---|
| 2006–07 | Andreas Nödl | Right Wing | St. Cloud State |
| 2007–08 | Richard Bachman | Goaltender | Colorado College |
| 2008–09 | Kieran Millan | Goaltender | Boston University |
| 2009–10 | Stéphane Da Costa | Center | Merrimack |
| 2010–11 | T. J. Tynan | Center | Notre Dame |
| 2011–12 | Joey LaLeggia | Defenceman | Denver |
| 2012–13 | Jon Gillies | Goaltender | Providence |
| 2013–14 | Sam Anas | Center | Quinnipiac |
| 2014–15 | Jack Eichel | Center | Boston University |
| 2015–16 | Kyle Connor | Left Wing | Michigan |
| 2016–17 | Clayton Keller | Center | Boston University |
| 2017–18 | Scott Perunovich | Defenceman | Minnesota–Duluth |
| 2018–19 | Joel Farabee | Left Wing | Boston University |
| 2019–20 | Alex Newhook | Center | Boston College |
| 2020–21 | Thomas Bordeleau | Center | Michigan |
| 2021–22 | Devon Levi | Goaltender | Northeastern |
| 2022–23 | Adam Fantilli | Center | Michigan |
| 2023–24 | Macklin Celebrini | Center | Boston University |
| 2024–25 | Cole Hutson | Defenceman | Boston University |
| 2025–26 | Ethan Wyttenbach | Left Wing | Quinnipiac |

=== Winners by school ===
| School | Winners |
|---|---|
| Boston University | 6 |
| Michigan | 3 |
| Quinnipiac | 2 |
| Boston College | 1 |
| Colorado College | 1 |
| Denver | 1 |
| Merrimack | 1 |
| Minnesota–Duluth | 1 |
| Northeastern | 1 |
| Notre Dame | 1 |
| Providence | 1 |
| St. Cloud State | 1 |

=== Winners by position ===
| Position | Winners |
|---|---|
| Center | 8 |
| Goaltender | 4 |
| Left Wing | 3 |
| Defenceman | 3 |
| Right Wing | 1 |
