= Hayden Stavroff =

American ice hockey player (born 2004)

- Born: July 9, 2004 (age 21) Dublin, Ohio, U.S.
- Height: 5 ft 11 in (180 cm)
- Weight: 190 lb (86 kg; 13 st 8 lb)
- Position: Forward
- Shoots: Right
- NCAA team: Dartmouth

Hayden Stavroff (born July 9, 2004) is an American college ice hockey forward for Dartmouth of the National Collegiate Athletic Association (NCAA).

== Playing career ==
=== Junior ===
Stavroff began his career with the Salmon Arm Silverbacks of the British Columbia Hockey League (BCHL). During the 2022–23 season, he recorded 14 goals and 21 assists in 40 regular-season games. He then joined the Alberni Valley Bulldogs for the 2023–24 season, and led the BCHL in scoring with 35 goals and 20 assists in 46 regular-season games.

=== College ===
He began his college ice hockey at Dartmouth during the 2024–25 season. In his freshman year, he recorded ten goals and 12 assists in 31 games. In December 2024, he recorded three goals and two assists in six games and was named the ECAC Hockey Rookie of the Month.

During the 2025–26 season, in his sophomore year, he recorded 29 goals and 19 assists in 35 games. In 22 conference games, he averaged 1.68 points per game and led the league with 22 goals and added 15 assists. He led the NCAA in goals and ranked third in the country in points per game, behind Gavin McKenna and Ethan Wyttenbach. In 10 Ivy League games, he recorded ten goals and 11 assists. He led the Ivy League in scoring and was the only player in the league to reach at least 20 points, and was named to the All-Ivy League First Team and the Ivy League Player of the Year. Following the season he was also named to the All-ECAC First Team and the ECAC Hockey Player of the Year. He was also named a top-ten finalist for the Hobey Baker Award, and AHCA East First Team All-American, becoming the first Big Green player since David Jones in 2007 to receive this honor.

== Career statistics ==
Bold indicates led league

			Regular season					Playoffs
Season	Team	League	GP	G	A	Pts	PIM	GP	G	A	Pts	PIM
2022–23	Salmon Arm Silverbacks	BCHL	40	14	21	35	30	13	6	5	11	6
2023–24	Alberni Valley Bulldogs	BCHL	46	35	20	55	82	18	13	8	21	28
2024–25	Dartmouth College	ECAC	31	10	12	22	43	—	—	—	—	—
2025–26	Dartmouth College	ECAC	35	29	19	48	34	—	—	—	—	—
NCAA totals			66	39	31	70	77	—	—	—	—	—

== Awards and honors ==
Award	Year	Ref
College
All-Ivy League First Team	2026	
Ivy League Player of the Year	2026	
All-ECAC First Team	2026	
ECAC Player of the Year	2026	
AHCA East First Team All-American	2026	

Awards and achievements
Preceded by Ayrton Martino	ECAC Hockey Player of the Year; 2025–26	Succeeded by Incumbent
