= Ethan Wyttenbach =

American ice hockey player (born 2007)

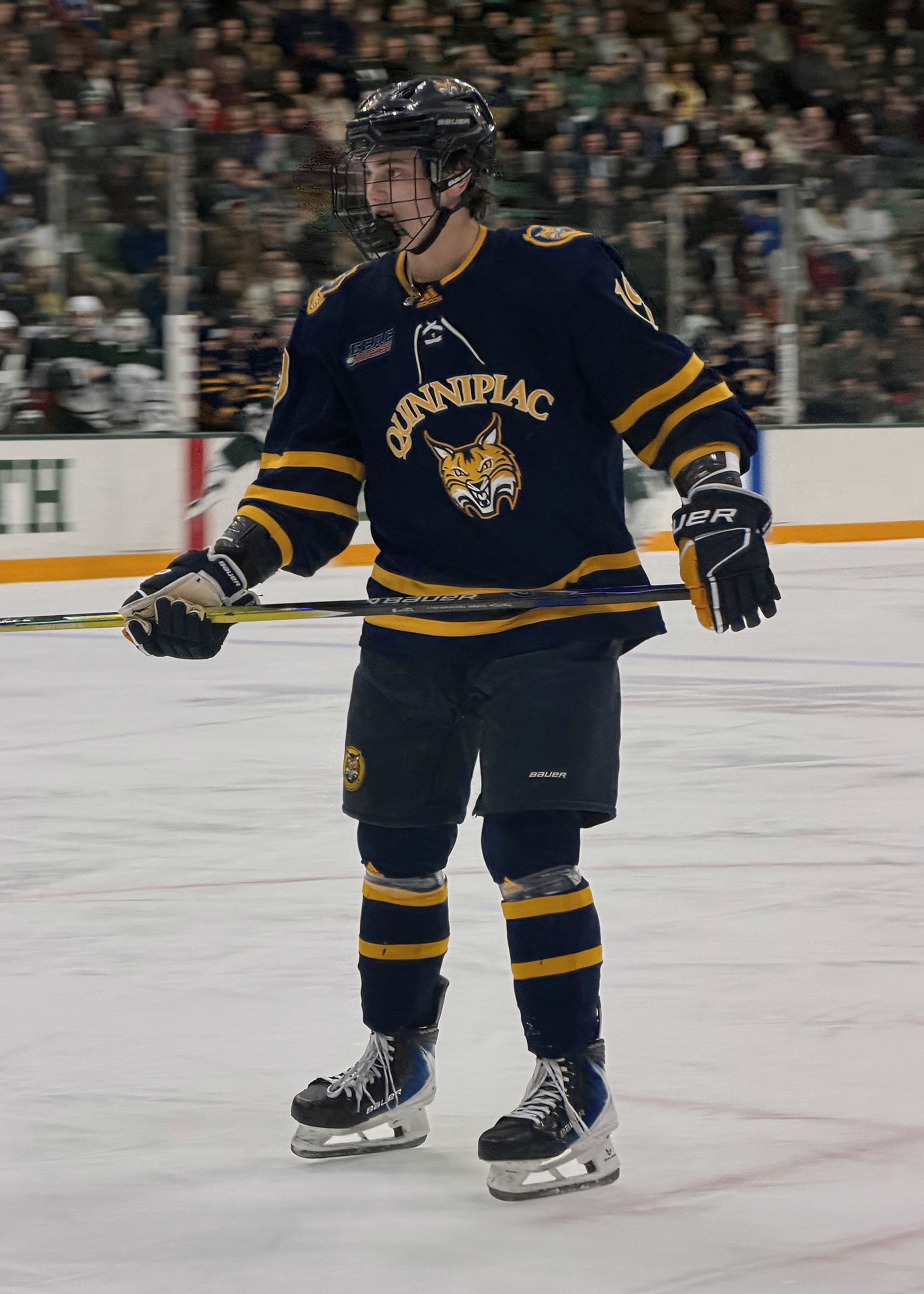
- Born: February 10, 2007 (age 19) Roslyn, New York, U.s.
- Height: 5 ft 11 in (180 cm)
- Weight: 185 lb (84 kg; 13 st 3 lb)
- Position: Forward
- Shoots: Right
- NCAA team: Quinnipiac
- NHL draft: 144th overall, 2025; Calgary Flames

Ethan Wyttenbach (born February 10, 2007) is an American college ice hockey forward for Quinnipiac of the National Collegiate Athletic Association (NCAA). Wyttenbach was drafted in the fifth round of the 2025 NHL entry draft by the Calgary Flames.

== Playing career ==
=== Junior ===
Wyttenbach played for the Sioux Falls Stampede of the United States Hockey League (USHL). During the 2024–25 season, he recorded 24 goals and 27 assists in 44 regular season games. He led the team in scoring despite missing time due to injury. He suffered a torn medial patellofemoral ligament in his knee in February 2025, and returned on March 27, 2025. He was named the inaugural winner of the Gaudreau Award, a yearly award bestowed upon the player in the USHL who best embodies the legacy of Johnny and Matthew Gaudreau.

On June 28, 2025, he was drafted in the fifth round, 144th overall, by the Calgary Flames in the 2025 NHL entry draft.

=== College ===
He began his college ice hockey at Quinnipiac during the 2025–26 season. In his freshman year, he led the NCAA in scoring with 25 goals and 34 assists in 40 games. On February 27, 2026, he scored two goals against Dartmouth, setting a new program record for freshman scoring, surpassing the previous record of 54 points set by Brian Herbert during the 1999–2000 season. His 59 points tied the Quinnipiac single-season record set by Bryan Leitch and Collin Graf. He became the fifth freshman since the 2000 season to lead the country in scoring, joining Jack Eichel, Kyle Connor, Adam Fantilli and Will Smith. Following an outstanding season, he was named a unanimous selection to both the All-ECAC Rookie team and All-ECAC first team. He was also named the ECAC Hockey Rookie of the Year and the Tim Taylor Award winner.

== Personal life ==
Wyttenbach's father, Andrew, played college ice hockey at Cornell. His grandfather, Heinz, played professional ice hockey in Switzerland before moving to the United States.

== Career statistics ==
Bold indicates led league

			Regular season					Playoffs
Season	Team	League	GP	G	A	Pts	PIM	GP	G	A	Pts	PIM
2024–25	Sioux Falls Stampede	USHL	44	24	27	51	28	4	1	3	4	2
2025–26	Quinnipiac University	ECAC	40	25	34	**59**	20	—	—	—	—	—
NCAA totals			40	25	34	59	20	—	—	—	—	—

== Awards and honors ==
Award	Year	Ref
College
All-ECAC Rookie Team	2026	
All-ECAC First Team	2026	
ECAC Rookie of the Year	2026	
Tim Taylor Award	2026	
AHCA East First Team All-American	2026	

Awards and achievements
Preceded by Cole Hutson	Tim Taylor Award; 2025–26	Succeeded by Incumbent
