= 2024–25 Harvard Crimson men's ice hockey season =

College ice hockey season

- Conference: 7th ECAC Hockey
- Home ice: Bright-Landry Hockey Center

Rankings
- USCHO: NR
- USA Hockey: NR

Record
- Overall: 13–17–3
- Conference: 9–10–3
- Home: 4–6–2
- Road: 7–9–1
- Neutral: 2–2–0

Coaches and captains
- Head coach: Ted Donato
- Assistant coaches: James Marcou; Matt Gilroy; Brian Robinson
- Captains: Jack Bar; Zakary Karpa; Ian Moore

The 2024–25 Harvard Crimson Men's ice hockey season was the 124th season of play for the program and 63rd in ECAC Hockey. The Crimson represented Harvard University in the 2024–25 NCAA Division I men's ice hockey season, played their home games at Bright-Landry Hockey Center and were coached by Ted Donato in his 20th season.

== Season ==
For virtually the entire season, Harvard was plagued by its lack of scoring. Injuries played a role in this, with Alex Gaffney missing all but 4 games, but that did not prevent the remainder of the team from being able to contribute. Though the Crimson's output increased from the previous season, it was far too inconsistent for the team to have any sustained success. The defense, too was not quite as good as expected; Harvard allowed nearly 3 goals per game for the year and, though the numbers were also improved from a year ago, the team wasn't getting the results from a squad that had seven defensemen selected in the NHL draft. One of the few positive notes during the season was the performance of the team's freshmen. Mick Thompson led the club in scoring, averaging just less than a point per game, while Ben Charette did not look out of place as a potential starting goaltender in future.

Harvard finished the regular season leading the pack of also-rans in ECAC Hockey. They had won just enough games to earn themselves a home game to start the postseason and got an advantageous match when they were pitted against one of the worst defensive teams in the nation, Rensselaer. A 5-goal output from the Crimson sent them to the quarterfinals against Clarkson, where the team finally showed a consistent winning effort. Twice in the first game, Harvard got into the lead but they were unable to hold either. The two teams looked to be heading into overtime before the Knights scored the winning tally with just 25 seconds to play. The Crimson could have crumbled in the rematch, particularly after Clarkson built a 2-goal lead early in the second. Instead, The defense held the Golden Knights off the board for the final 45 minutes and allowed the forwards to net three straight, the final in overtime, and even the series.

The deciding game saw Clarkson throw the puck on goal every chance they got and Aku Koskenvuo turned in one of his best performances all season. The junior netminder stopped 35 shots in regulation, allowing only one power play marker in 60 minutes. Harvard's offense wasn't any worse than they had been in the previous two games but they could only match the Knights' single tally and the two needed extra time once more. The teams seemed evenly matched and were testing both netminders with a bevy of shots. About 7 minutes in, Ryan Fine blocked a point shot but it took an unlucky bounce right to another Clarkson player. Koskenvuo slid out of position to prevent a shot from in tight but, after a quick pass, the Knights didn't miss their shot at an open net and won the game, ending Harvard's season.

== Departures ==
Player	Position	Nationality	Cause
Ryan Drkulec	Forward	United States	Graduation (retired)
Peter Frates	Forward	United States	Left program (retired)
Max Miller	Goaltender	United States	Graduation (retired)
Derek Mullahy	Goaltender	United States	Graduate transfer to Michigan Tech

== Recruiting ==
Player	Position	Nationality	Age	Notes
Ben Charette	Goaltender	Canada	21	Aurora, ON
William Hughes	Forward	United States	20	Andover, MA
Sean Keohane	Defenseman	United States	19	Boston, MA; selected 173rd overall in 2023
Will McDonough	Forward	United States	19	Duxbury, MA
Justin Solovey	Forward	United States	19	Holmdel, NJ
Lucas St. Louis	Defenseman	United States	19	Burlington, VT
Mick Thompson	Forward	Canada	20	Toronto, ON
Evan Zhang	Goaltender	Canada	18	Sherborn, MA

== Roster ==
As of August 12, 2024.

No.	Nat.	Player	Class	Pos	Height	Weight	DoB	Hometown	Previous team	NHL rights
1	(United States)	Evan Zhang	Freshman	G	6' 1" (1.85 m)	154 lb (70 kg)	2006-02-02	Sherborn, Massachusetts	Roxbury Latin School (US-Prep)	—
2	(United States)	Ian Moore (C)	Senior	D	6' 3" (1.91 m)	185 lb (84 kg)	2002-01-04	Concord, Massachusetts	Chicago Steel (USHL)	ANA, 67th overall 2020
5	(United States)	Sean Keohane	Freshman	D	6' 4" (1.93 m)	183 lb (83 kg)	2004-11-04	Boston, Massachusetts	West Kelowna Warriors (BCHL)	BUF, 173rd overall 2023
7	(United States)	Philip Tresca	Junior	F	6' 0" (1.83 m)	190 lb (86 kg)	2002-04-10	Newton, Massachusetts	Muskegon Lumberjacks (USHL)	—
8	(United States)	Alex Gaffney	Senior	F	5' 8" (1.73 m)	170 lb (77 kg)	2002-06-25	West Orange, New Jersey	Waterloo Black Hawks (USHL)	—
9	(United States)	Ryan Healey	Junior	D	6' 0" (1.83 m)	172 lb (78 kg)	2004-05-19	Hull, Massachusetts	Sioux Falls Stampede (USHL)	MIN, 121st overall 2022
10	(United States)	David Hejduk	Sophomore	D	6' 0" (1.83 m)	194 lb (88 kg)	2004-01-03	Parker, Colorado	Wenatchee Wild (BCHL)	—
11	(United States)	Ryan Fine	Sophomore	F	5' 9" (1.75 m)	183 lb (83 kg)	2005-03-14	Center Moriches, New York	USNTDP (USHL)	—
12	(United States)	Joe Miller	Junior	F	5' 9" (1.75 m)	160 lb (73 kg)	2002-09-15	Minneapolis, Minnesota	Chicago Steel (USHL)	TOR, 180th overall 2020
13	(United States)	Marek Hejduk	Junior	F	6' 0" (1.83 m)	184 lb (83 kg)	2004-01-03	Parker, Colorado	USNTDP (USHL)	—
14	(Canada)	Matthew Morden	Sophomore	D	6' 4" (1.93 m)	203 lb (92 kg)	2004-07-29	Hamilton, Ontario	Muskegon Lumberjacks (USHL)	UTA, 131st overall 2022
15	(United States)	Luke Khozozian	Senior	F	5' 10" (1.78 m)	180 lb (82 kg)	2001-04-21	Weston, Massachusetts	East Coast Wizards (EHL)	—
16	(United States)	William McDonough	Freshman	F	6' 2" (1.88 m)	194 lb (88 kg)	2005-06-18	Duxbury, Massachusetts	Sioux Falls Stampede (USHL)	—
17	(United States)	Will Hughes	Freshman	F	6' 2" (1.88 m)	183 lb (83 kg)	2003-09-23	Andover, Massachusetts	Green Bay Gamblers (USHL)	—
18	(United States)	Michael Callow	Sophomore	F	6' 4" (1.93 m)	181 lb (82 kg)	2004-01-15	Boston, Massachusetts	Muskegon Lumberjacks (USHL)	ANA, 154th overall 2022
19	(United States)	Ben MacDonald	Sophomore	F	6' 0" (1.83 m)	181 lb (82 kg)	2004-02-24	Weston, Massachusetts	West Kelowna Warriors (BCHL)	SEA, 91st overall 2022
20	(United States)	Tommy Lyons	Senior	F	6' 0" (1.83 m)	185 lb (84 kg)	2000-04-01	East Falmouth, Massachusetts	Chilliwack Chiefs (BCHL)	—
21	(Canada)	Cam Johnson	Sophomore	F	5' 9" (1.75 m)	146 lb (66 kg)	2004-11-28	Vancouver, British Columbia	Chicago Steel (USHL)	—
22	(United States)	Mason Langenbrunner	Junior	D	6' 3" (1.91 m)	179 lb (81 kg)	2002-09-14	Eden Prairie, Minnesota	Fargo Force (USHL)	BOS, 151st overall 2020
23	(United States)	Salvatore Guzzo	Sophomore	F	5' 11" (1.8 m)	168 lb (76 kg)	2005-04-17	Old Tappan, New Jersey	USNTDP (USHL)	—
24	(Canada)	Jack Bar (C)	Senior	D	6' 2" (1.88 m)	195 lb (88 kg)	2002-10-24	Newmarket, Ontario	Chicago Steel (USHL)	DAL, 138th overall 2021
25	(United States)	Justin Solovey	Freshman	F	6' 2" (1.88 m)	209 lb (95 kg)	2004-11-29	Holmdel, New Jersey	Muskegon Lumberjacks (USHL)	—
26	(United States)	Lucas St. Louis	Freshman	D	5' 11" (1.8 m)	170 lb (77 kg)	2005-03-30	Burlington, Vermont	Dubuque Fighting Saints (USHL)	—
27	(Canada)	Mick Thompson	Freshman	F	5' 9" (1.75 m)	170 lb (77 kg)	2004-03-01	Toronto, Ontario	Chicago Steel (USHL)	—
29	(United States)	Casey Severo	Junior	F	5' 9" (1.75 m)	177 lb (80 kg)	2001-02-01	Penfield, New York	Madison Capitols (USHL)	—
30	(Finland)	Aku Koskenvuo	Junior	G	6' 4" (1.93 m)	173 lb (78 kg)	2003-02-26	Espoo, Finland	HIFK U20 (U20 SM-sarja)	VAN, 137th overall 2021
31	(Canada)	Ben Charette	Freshman	G	6' 2" (1.88 m)	183 lb (83 kg)	2003-09-23	Aurora, Ontario	Whitecourt Wolverines (AJHL)	—
33	(Canada)	Kyle Aucoin	Senior	D	6' 0" (1.83 m)	175 lb (79 kg)	2002-07-02	Ottawa, Ontario	Muskegon Lumberjacks (USHL)	DET, 156th overall 2020
43	(United States)	Christian Jimenez	Senior	D	5' 9" (1.75 m)	195 lb (88 kg)	2002-03-15	Yorktown Heights, New York	Sioux City Musketeers (USHL)	—
59	(United States)	Zakary Karpa (C)	Senior	F	6' 2" (1.88 m)	190 lb (86 kg)	2002-03-25	Newport Beach, California	Des Moines Buccaneers (USHL)	NYR, 191st overall 2022

== Standings ==
2024–25 ECAC Hockey Standings
	Conference record										Overall record					
	GP	W	L	T	OTW	OTL	SW	PTS	GF	GA	GP	W	L	T	GF	GA
#15 Quinnipiac †	22	16	5	1	2	3	0	50	79	42	38	24	12	2	135	83
#20 Clarkson	22	15	6	1	2	1	0	45	74	47	39	24	12	3	121	87
Colgate	22	13	7	2	2	2	1	42	80	65	36	18	15	3	114	116
Union	22	12	8	2	0	0	2	40	67	61	36	19	14	3	112	109
Dartmouth	22	12	9	1	0	2	0	39	70	52	33	18	13	2	110	84
#12 Cornell *	22	10	8	4	1	0	3	36	69	53	36	19	11	6	112	82
Harvard	22	9	10	3	2	2	1	31	56	56	33	13	17	3	85	97
Brown	22	9	11	2	3	0	2	28	53	63	32	14	15	3	79	85
Princeton	22	7	12	3	2	2	1	25	55	73	30	12	15	3	71	86
Rensselaer	22	7	15	0	0	2	0	23	57	82	35	12	21	2	101	131
Yale	22	5	14	3	1	1	1	19	52	80	30	6	21	3	67	121
St. Lawrence	22	5	15	2	1	1	1	18	43	81	35	9	24	2	71	121
Championship: March 22, 2025 † indicates conference regular season champion (Cleary Cup) * indicates conference tournament champion (Whitelaw Cup); Rankings: USCHO.com Top 20 Poll

== Schedule and results ==
Date	Time	Opponent^{#}	Rank^{#}	Site	TV	Decision	Result	Attendance	Record
Exhibition
October 18	7:00 pm	USNTDP*		Bright-Landry Hockey Center • Boston, Massachusetts (Exhibition)	ESPN+	Koskenvuo	W 5–4	543	
October 19	7:00 pm	at Boston University*		Bright-Landry Hockey Center • Boston, Massachusetts (Exhibition)	ESPN+	Koskenvuo	T 2–2 ^{OT}	5,750	
Regular Season
November 1	7:00 pm	at Dartmouth		Thompson Arena • Hanover, New Hampshire	ESPN+	Koskenvuo	L 1–2	2,054	0–1–0 (0–1–0)
November 8	7:00 pm	at Princeton		Hobey Baker Memorial Rink • Princeton, New Jersey	ESPN+	Koskenvuo	W 4–3	2,352	1–1–0 (1–1–0)
November 9	7:00 pm	at #15 Quinnipiac		M&T Bank Arena • Hamden, Connecticut	ESPN+	Koskenvuo	W 3–0	3,429	2–1–0 (2–1–0)
November 15	7:00 pm	Colgate	#20	Bright-Landry Hockey Center • Boston, Massachusetts	ESPN+	Koskenvuo	L 2–4	2,238	2–2–0 (2–2–0)
November 16	7:00 pm	#5 Cornell	#20	Bright-Landry Hockey Center • Boston, Massachusetts (Rivalry)	ESPN+	Koskenvuo	T 2–2 ^{SOL}	2,917	2–2–1 (2–2–1)
November 22	7:00 pm	at #20 Massachusetts*		Mullins Center • Amherst, Massachusetts	ESPN+	Koskenvuo	L 3–5	5,126	2–3–1
Friendship Four
November 29	2:00 pm	vs. Notre Dame*		SSE Arena Belfast • Belfast, Northern Ireland (Friendship Four Semifinal)	NESN	Koskenvuo	L 2–5	9,000	2–4–1
November 30	10:00 am	vs. Merrimack*		SSE Arena Belfast • Belfast, Northern Ireland (Friendship Four Consolation Game)	NESN	Charette	W 4–3	9,000	3–4–1
December 6	7:00 pm	#20 Clarkson		Bright-Landry Hockey Center • Boston, Massachusetts	ESPN+	Charette	L 3–4	1,580	3–5–1 (2–3–1)
December 7	7:00 pm	St. Lawrence		Bright-Landry Hockey Center • Boston, Massachusetts	ESPN+	Charette	T 0–0 ^{SOW}	—	3–5–2 (2–3–2)
January 1	7:00 pm	#18 Quinnipiac		Bright-Landry Hockey Center • Boston, Massachusetts	ESPN+	Charette	L 2–3 ^{OT}	—	3–6–2 (2–4–2)
January 4	7:00 pm	Connecticut*		Bright-Landry Hockey Center • Boston, Massachusetts	ESPN+	Charette	L 3–7	—	3–7–2
January 10	7:00 pm	Brown		Bright-Landry Hockey Center • Boston, Massachusetts	ESPN+	Charette	W 3–1	1,938	4–7–2 (3–4–2)
January 11	7:00 pm	Yale		Bright-Landry Hockey Center • Boston, Massachusetts (Rivalry)	ESPN+	Koskenvuo	W 3–1	—	5–7–2 (4–4–2)
January 14	7:00 pm	at #2 Boston College*		Conte Forum • Chestnut Hill, Massachusetts	ESPN+	Charette	L 1–3	7,186	5–8–2
January 17	7:00 pm	at Rensselaer		Houston Field House • Troy, New York	ESPN+	Koskenvuo	W 5–2	1,904	6–8–2 (5–4–2)
January 18	7:00 pm	at Union		Achilles Rink • Schenectady, New York	ESPN+	Charette	L 1–4	1,973	6–9–2 (5–5–2)
January 24	7:00 pm	at Cornell		Lynah Rink • Ithaca, New York (Rivalry)	ESPN+	Koskenvuo	L 1–4	4,267	6–10–2 (5–6–2)
January 25	7:00 pm	at Colgate		Class of 1965 Arena • Hamilton, New York	ESPN+	Charette	W 4–1	1,243	7–10–2 (6–6–2)
January 31	7:00 pm	Princeton		Bright-Landry Hockey Center • Boston, Massachusetts	ESPN+	Charette	L 3–4 ^{OT}	2,603	7–11–2 (6–7–2)
Beanpot
February 3	5:00 pm	vs. #8 Boston University*		TD Garden • Boston, Massachusetts (Beanpot Semifinal)	NESN	Charette	L 1–7	—	7–12–2
February 7	7:00 pm	at Dartmouth		Thompson Arena • Hanover, New Hampshire	ESPN+	Koskenvuo	L 2–3	2,902	7–13–2 (6–8–2)
February 10	4:30 pm	vs. Northeastern*		TD Garden • Boston, Massachusetts (Beanpot Consolation Game)	NESN	Charette	W 4–3	18,258	8–13–2
February 14	7:00 pm	at St. Lawrence		Appleton Arena • Canton, New York	ESPN+	Charette	W 6–2	732	9–13–2 (7–8–2)
February 15	7:00 pm	at Clarkson		Cheel Arena • Potsdam, New York	ESPN+	Koskenvuo	L 0–6	2,586	9–14–2 (7–9–2)
February 21	7:00 pm	Union		Bright-Landry Hockey Center • Boston, Massachusetts	ESPN+	Charette	L 1–2	2,372	9–15–2 (7–10–2)
February 22	7:00 pm	Rensselaer		Bright-Landry Hockey Center • Boston, Massachusetts	ESPN+	Koskenvuo	W 3–2	—	10–15–2 (8–10–2)
February 28	7:00 pm	at Yale		Ingalls Rink • New Haven, Connecticut (Rivalry)	ESPN+	Koskenvuo	W 4–3 ^{OT}	3,340	11–15–2 (9–10–2)
March 1	7:00 pm	at Brown		Meehan Auditorium • Providence, Rhode Island	ESPN+	Charette	T 3–3 ^{SOL}	1,627	11–15–3 (9–10–3)
ECAC Hockey Tournament
March 7	7:00 pm	Rensselaer*		Bright-Landry Hockey Center • Boston, Massachusetts (ECAC First Round)	ESPN+	Koskenvuo	W 5–2	1,420	12–15–3
March 14	7:00 pm	at #18 Clarkson*		Cheel Arena • Potsdam, New York (ECAC Quarterfinal Game 1)	ESPN+	Koskenvuo	L 2–3	2,466	12–16–3
March 15	4:00 pm	at #18 Clarkson*		Cheel Arena • Potsdam, New York (ECAC Quarterfinal Game 2)	ESPN+	Koskenvuo	W 3–2 ^{OT}	2,492	13–16–3
March 16	4:00 pm	at #18 Clarkson*		Cheel Arena • Potsdam, New York (ECAC Quarterfinal Game 3)	ESPN+	Koskenvuo	L 1–2 ^{OT}	2,069	13–17–3
*Non-conference game. ^{#}Rankings from USCHO.com Poll. All times are in Eastern Time. Source:

== Scoring statistics ==
Name	Position	Games	Goals	Assists	Points	PIM
Mick Thompson	LW	33	14	18	32	2
Casey Severo	C	33	16	12	28	4
Joe Miller	C	28	5	18	23	8
Ben MacDonald	C	27	5	11	16	18
Ian Moore	D	32	3	11	14	14
Ryan Healey	D	33	4	9	13	12
Justin Solovey	F	33	5	7	12	16
Philip Tresca	C	31	4	8	12	6
Lucas St. Louis	D	33	2	9	11	12
Mason Langenbrunner	D	33	6	4	10	24
Cam Johnson	C	31	5	4	9	2
Michael Callow	RW	30	3	5	8	14
Zakary Karpa	C	31	1	6	7	8
Matthew Morden	D	31	1	5	6	6
Marek Hejduk	D	26	4	1	5	8
Ryan Fine	F	24	1	4	5	2
Kyle Aucoin	D	28	2	2	4	8
Salvatore Guzzo	F	21	3	0	3	8
Jack Bar	D	25	0	3	3	25
William Hughes	C	31	1	1	2	6
Sean Keohane	D	11	0	2	2	12
Tommy Lyons	F	13	0	2	2	0
Luke Khozozian	F	1	0	0	0	0
Evan Zhang	G	1	0	0	0	0
Alex Gaffney	C	4	0	0	0	0
Christian Jimenez	D	4	0	0	0	0
Ben Charette	G	17	0	0	0	0
Aku Koskenvuo	G	21	0	0	0	0
Bench	–	–	–	–	–	4
Total			85	142	227	219

== Goaltending statistics ==
Name	Games	Minutes	Wins	Losses	Ties	Goals against	Saves	Shut outs	SV %	GAA
Evan Zhang	1	0:13	0	0	0	0	0	0	–	0.00
Ben Charette	17	910:57	5	8	2	42	422	1	.909	2.77
Aku Koskenvuo	21	1089:14	8	9	1	51	469	1	.902	2.81
Empty Net	-	19:40	-	-	-	4	-	-	-	-
Total	33	2020:04	13	17	3	97	891	2	.902	2.88

== Rankings ==
Poll	Week																											
Poll	Pre	1	2	3	4	5	6	7	8	9	10	11	12	13	14	15	16	17	18	19	20	21	22	23	24	25	26	27 (Final)
USCHO.com	RV	RV	RV	RV	RV	RV	20	RV	RV	RV	RV	NR	–	NR	RV	NR	NR	NR	NR	NR	NR	NR	NR	NR	NR	NR	–	NR
USA Hockey	RV	RV	RV	RV	RV	RV	19	RV	RV	RV	RV	NR	–	NR	NR	NR	NR	NR	NR	NR	NR	NR	NR	NR	NR	NR	NR	NR

Note: USCHO did not release a poll in week 12 or 26.
Note: USA Hockey did not release a poll in week 12.

== Awards and honors ==
Player	Award	Ref
Ben Charette	ECAC Hockey All-Rookie Team	
Mick Thompson	ECAC Hockey All-Rookie Team	

== 2025 NHL entry draft ==
Round	Pick	Player	NHL team
4	122	Alex Huang ^{†}	Nashville Predators
6	176	Aiden Lane ^{†}	Calgary Flames
7	210	Richard Gallant ^{†}	San Jose Sharks

† incoming freshman
