= 2024–25 ECAC Hockey men's season =

- Season: 2024–25
- Conference: ECAC Hockey
- Division: Division I
- Sport: men's ice hockey
- Duration: October 4, 2024– March 29, 2025
- Number of teams: 12
- TV partner(s): ESPN+

NHL Entry Draft

Regular Season
- Season champions: Quinnipiac
- Season MVP: Ayrton Martino
- Top scorer: Ayrton Martino

ECAC Hockey tournament
- Tournament champions: Cornell
- Runners-up: Clarkson
- Tournament MVP: Ian Shane
- Top scorer: Sean Chisholm; Ayrton Martino; Nikita Nikora; Ondřej Pšenička

NCAA tournament
- Bids: 2
- Record: 1–2
- Best Finish: Reginal Final
- Team(s): Cornell; Quinnipiac

The 2024–25 ECAC Hockey men's season was the 64th season of play for ECAC Hockey and took place during the 2024–25 NCAA Division I men's ice hockey season. The season began on October 4, 2024, and concluded on March 29, 2025 when Cornell lost in the NCAA tournament Toledo regional final.

== Coaches ==
At the conclusion of the previous season, Princeton announced that Ron Fogarty would not be returning as head coach. Soon thereafter, Cornell's associate head coach, Ben Syer, was named as the Tigers' 18th head coach.

Later in the offseason, Cornell head coach Mike Schafer announced that this would be his final season behind the bench. At the same time, Casey Jones, then the head coach for Clarkson, was announced as Schafer's successor and he joined the staff as an associate head coach.

Clarkson then announced that alumnus and former assistant coach, Jean-François Houle, would leave the Laval Rocket to take over at his alma mater.

=== Records ===
Team	Head coach	Season at school	Record at school	ECAC Hockey record
Brown	Brendan Whittet	15	131–261–56	85–179–44
Clarkson	Jean-François Houle	1	0–0–0	0–0–0
Colgate	Mike Harder	2	16–16–4	13–7–2
Cornell	Mike Schafer	29	542–289–111	337–174–83
Dartmouth	Reid Cashman	4	25–56–13	18–38–10
Harvard	Ted Donato	20	305–259–72	205–163–61
Princeton	Ben Syer	1	0–0–0	0–0–0
Quinnipiac	Rand Pecknold	30	642–347–105	237–135–52
Rensselaer	Dave Smith	7	75–131–17	49–75–8
St. Lawrence	Brent Brekke	6	52–92–21	33–56–14
Union	Josh Hauge	3	30–37–5	17–23–4
Yale	Keith Allain	18	276–233–51	187–162–33

== Standings ==
2024–25 ECAC Hockey Standings
	Conference record										Overall record					
	GP	W	L	T	OTW	OTL	SW	PTS	GF	GA	GP	W	L	T	GF	GA
#15 Quinnipiac †	22	16	5	1	2	3	0	50	79	42	38	24	12	2	135	83
#20 Clarkson	22	15	6	1	2	1	0	45	74	47	39	24	12	3	121	87
Colgate	22	13	7	2	2	2	1	42	80	65	36	18	15	3	114	116
Union	22	12	8	2	0	0	2	40	67	61	36	19	14	3	112	109
Dartmouth	22	12	9	1	0	2	0	39	70	52	33	18	13	2	110	84
#12 Cornell *	22	10	8	4	1	0	3	36	69	53	36	19	11	6	112	82
Harvard	22	9	10	3	2	2	1	31	56	56	33	13	17	3	85	97
Brown	22	9	11	2	3	0	2	28	53	63	32	14	15	3	79	85
Princeton	22	7	12	3	2	2	1	25	55	73	30	12	15	3	71	86
Rensselaer	22	7	15	0	0	2	0	23	57	82	35	12	21	2	101	131
Yale	22	5	14	3	1	1	1	19	52	80	30	6	21	3	67	121
St. Lawrence	22	5	15	2	1	1	1	18	43	81	35	9	24	2	71	121
Championship: March 22, 2025 † indicates conference regular season champion (Cleary Cup) * indicates conference tournament champion (Whitelaw Cup); Rankings: USCHO.com Top 20 Poll

== Non-Conference record ==
Overall, the ECAC had an average record against non-conference opponents. The conference as a whole was able to post a winning record against most other leagues, however, member teams suffered in the PairWise rankings due to from where the majority of their wins arose. Atlantic Hockey America had the worst record in non-conference play and provided little benefit to ECAC teams despite a stellar record. Conversely, the poor performance against Hockey East did not damage the ECAC prospects as much as it could have due to that league having the best non-conference record in the country. Because of this, the ECAC had several teams finish in the top half of the rankings but most fell just shy of the tournament cut line.

=== Regular season record ===
Team	AHA	Big Ten	CCHA	Hockey East	Independent	NCHC	Total
Brown	1–0–1	0–0–0	0–0–0	1–2–0	2–0–0	0–0–0	4–2–1
Clarkson	2–1–0	0–1–0	2–0–0	1–1–1	1–1–1	0–0–0	6–4–2
Colgate	3–0–1	0–2–0	0–0–0	0–4–0	2–0–0	0–0–0	5–6–1
Cornell	0–1–1	0–0–0	0–0–0	1–0–0	0–0–0	2–1–0	3–2–1
Dartmouth	0–0–0	0–0–0	0–0–0	1–3–1	2–0–0	0–0–0	3–3–1
Harvard	0–0–0	0–1–0	0–0–0	2–4–0	0–0–0	0–0–0	2–5–0
Princeton	3–0–0	2–0–0	0–0–0	0–2–0	0–0–0	0–0–0	5–2–0
Quinnipiac	2–0–0	1–0–0	0–0–0	1–5–0	1–0–0	0–0–0	5–5–0
Rensselaer	3–1–2	0–0–0	0–0–0	0–3–0	0–0–0	2–0–0	5–4–2
St. Lawrence	3–0–0	0–3–0	1–1–0	0–3–0	0–1–0	0–0–0	4–8–0
Union	5–0–0	0–0–0	0–0–0	0–3–0	1–1–1	0–0–0	6–4–1
Yale	0–1–0	0–0–0	0–0–0	1–0–0	0–2–0	0–2–0	1–5–0
Overall	22–4–5	3–7–0	3–1–0	8–30–2	9–5–2	4–3–0	49–50–9

== Statistics ==
=== Leading scorers ===
GP = Games played; G = Goals; A = Assists; Pts = Points; PIM = Penalty minutes

Player	Class	Team	GP	G	A	Pts	PIM
Ayrton Martino	Senior	Clarkson	22	21	17	38	8
C. J. Foley	Sophomore	Dartmouth	22	9	15	24	6
Ellis Rickwood	Junior	Clarkson	22	6	18	24	8
Travis Treloar	Graduate	Quinnipiac	22	9	14	23	2
Brett Chorske	Senior	Colgate	22	10	12	22	4
Mason Marcellus	Sophomore	Quinnipiac	22	8	14	22	16
Tyler Kopff	Sophomore	Brown	22	7	15	22	8
Jeremy Wilmer	Senior	Quinnipiac	22	6	16	22	2
Mick Thompson	Freshman	Harvard	22	8	13	21	2
Dalton Bancroft	Junior	Cornell	22	12	8	20	36
Andon Cerbone	Sophomore	Quinnipiac	22	9	11	20	8

=== Leading goaltenders ===
Minimum 1/3 of team's minutes played in conference games.
GP = Games played; Min = Minutes played; W = Wins; L = Losses; T = Ties; GA = Goals against; SO = Shutouts; SV% = Save percentage; GAA = Goals against average

Player	Class	Team	GP	Min	W	L	T	GA	SO	SV%	GAA
Matej Marinov	Sophomore	Quinnipiac	9	502:16	7	1	0	13	2	.937	1.55
Dylan Silverstein	Freshman	Quinnipiac	14	828:54	9	4	1	27	0	.903	1.95
Emmett Croteau	Freshman	Dartmouth	12	704:18	8	4	0	24	1	.902	2.04
Ethan Langenegger	Graduate	Clarkson	20	1155:43	13	5	1	43	1	.913	2.23
Ben Charette	Freshman	Harvard	10	612:12	3	5	2	23	1	.926	2.25

== ECAC tournament ==
Teams are reseeded for the quarterfinal and semifinal rounds

First Round; March 7–8
5	Dartmouth	6
12	St. Lawrence	2
6	Cornell	5
11	Yale	1
7	Harvard	5
10	Rensselaer	2
8	Brown	3
9	Princeton	2

Quarterfinals; March 14–16
1	Quinnipiac	4	4	-
8	Brown	1	0	-
2	Clarkson	3	2	2*
7	Harvard	2	3*	1
3	Colgate	1	0	-
6	Cornell	4	3	-
4	Union	2	2	-
5	Dartmouth	3	7	-

Semifinals; March 21
1	Quinnipiac	2
6	Cornell	3*
2	Clarkson	4
5	Dartmouth	1

Championship; March 22
6	Cornell	3
2	Clarkson	1

Note: * denotes overtime period(s)

== NCAA tournament ==
=== Regional semifinals ===
March 27, 2025; 5:30 pm	(1) Michigan State	3–4 (2–1, 1–1, 0–2)	(4) Cornell	Huntington Center; Attendance: 6,937

Game reference

Trey Augustine
Goalies
Ian Shane
Referees:
Geoff Miller
Terrance Murphy
Linesmen:
Bill Kingdon
Jeff McCorkle

(Larson, Dorwart) Gavin O'Connell (6) – 07:20	1–0
	1–1	15:02 – Ryan Walsh (15) (Robertson, Mack)
(Stramel, Howard) Daniel Russell (13) – PP – 19:31	2–1
	2–2	36:30 – Charlie Major (4) (Stanley)
(Štrbák, O'Connell) Karsen Dorwart (13) – 36:47	3–2
	3–3	52:38 – Ryan Walsh (16) (Robertson)
	3–4	59:50 – GW PP – Sullivan Mack (17) (Major, Fegaras)

2 min
Penalties
2 min
37
Shots
21

Game summary

March 28, 2025; 5:00 pm	(2) Connecticut	4–1 (2–0, 1–1, 1–0)	(3) Quinnipiac	PPL Center; Attendance: 7,358

Game reference

Callum Tung
Goalies
Dylan Silverstein
Referees:
Brendan Blanchard
Ryan Sweeney
Linesmen:
Brendan Lewis
Joe Sherman

(Heaslip, Carabin) Hugh Larkin (3) – 08:25	1–0
(unassisted) Ethan Gardula (8) – GW – 14:32	2–0
	2–1	30:11 – Jeremy Wilmer (15) (Marcellus, Leddy)
(Percival, Spetz) Tristan Fraser (4) – 34:13	3–1
(Messineo) Joey Muldowney (28) – EN – 57:45	4–1

6 min
Penalties
4 min
22
Shots
22

Game summary
The start of the game saw Cooper Moore get crosschecked to the ice and then slide into his goal post but he was able to skate away without injury. The two teams were skating fast to start but both seemed to be trying to force the play a bit on offense and failed to connect on their opportunities. The first good chance came then Quinnipiac coughed up the puck behind their net but Dylan Silverstein was able to make the save on Tristan Fraser. The two teams skated up and down the ice for the next several minutes but produced very few shots on goal. Near the middle of the period, the Bobcats turned the puck over at their blueline and UConn was able to set up in the zone. After missing on their first chance, Hugh Larkin fired the puck top corner for Connecticut's first ever NCAA tournament goal. On the following attack, UConn was nearly able to double the lead but did end up forcing Travis Treloar into taking a slashing penalty. Quinnipiac's remade penalty kill was effective in keeping the Huskies to the outside and didn't give up a scoring chance on the disadvantage. Connecticut was able to get better chances once they were back at even strength but Silverstein was able to keep the puck out of the net. In the back half of the period, the Bobcat offense began to show signs of life but couldn't get much of a chance on the goal. Near the 5-minute mark, Quinnipiac made another mistake at its own blueline. Ethan Gardula was able to skate in alone and backhand the puck over the outstretched leg of Silverstein for the second goal of the match. After Quinnipiac was able to work the puck down low in the final minutes, Jake Richard was called for crosschecking to give the Bobcats their first power play of the game. With the #1 power play in the nation, Quinnipiac took the chance to get their first real scoring opportunity of the game but UConn's defense was able to prevent any further shots from getting on goal. Though they failed to score, the Bobcats' offense looked far better in the remaining few seconds and headed into the first intermission with momentum if nothing else.

The Huskies took control at the start of the second and Hudson Schandor had a open look right in front of the goal but Silverstein made the glove save. Kaden Shahan had another solo rush about a minute later but the puck rolled and he could only get a weak shot on goal. Quinnipiac tried to counter but they were unable to break through the UConn defense. Poor passing by the Bobcats did not help their efforts but Quinnipiac did eventually settle down and start to generate zone time in the Husky end. Connecticut battled back and kept the play mostly even until Jeremy Wilmer gloved the puck off of the faceoff and was handed a minor for the violation. It didn't take long for UConn to get a good chance at a goal but Silverstein's left toe made the stop on Richard. Just after the power play expired, UConn made a mistake just inside the Quinnipiac zone and gave up a 2-on-1 to the Bobcats Mason Marcellus made a brilliant backhand pass to Wilmer who lifted the puck over a sprawling Callum Tung to cut the lead in half. After a rush up the ice by Victor Czerneckianair, the two teams began to show some genuine dislike with some post-whistle roughhousing. While Quinnipiac looked like they had rediscovered their game, the team made a critical mistake when they turned over the puck down low. UConn fired the puck in from the point and it eventually found Fraser right in front of the goal who fired it past a helpless Silverstein to restore their lead. After the following faceoff, Quinnipiac went back on the attack and drew a penalty when John Spetz chopped down Elliott Groenewold's stick. UConn's penalty kill gave Quinnipiac fits, not only stopping the Bobcats from getting a good shot on goal but threatening to the Quinnipiac cage on more than one occasion. The Bobcats had better chances after their power play ended but they were unable to score again and ended the second still needing two goals.

Connecticut continued to press in the offensive zone from the start of the third. While they didn't get much in the way of scoring chances, their presence in the Bobcats' zone prevented Quinnipiac from getting their offense going. Eventually Jack Ricketts skated the puck up the ice and soon thereafter Wilmer briefly looked to have scored his second of the game but the puck hit the crossbar, bounced down behind Tung and was cleared by Viking Gustafsson Nyberg before it could roll into the goal. After the near-miss, Quinnipiac continued to probe away at the UConn defenses but the Huskies didn't give up any easy opportunities. Eventually, however, the constant attacking by the Bobcats resulted in Fraser taking an interference penalty. Quinnipiac's power play continued to have trouble finding a clear lane to the net and after a few turnovers again gave up the best chance to the Huskies. Just after the power play ended, Moore was tripped near the UConn net and kicked Tung in the head as he was going down. The netminder went down and was stunned momentarily but was able to continue after an injury stoppage. He was then immediately threatened after a UConn turnover but managed to made a glove save to preserve the 2-goal lead. Quinnipiac tried desperately to get something going offensively in the final 8 minutes but Connecticut refused to give an inch. With less then 4 minutes to play the Bobcats were finally able to get through to the UConn cage and nearly able to break through on a goal mouth scramble but Tung and the Husky defense held them back. Silverstein was pulled early for an extra attacker and the Bobcats were finally able to get something going when they had an additional player. With just over 2 minutes to play, Joey Muldowney cleared the puck down the ice. The disk was rolling, got on edge and curled into the Bobcat net to essentially end the match. The final seconds passed with both teams coming to that realization and it was UConn who could decisively claim the championship of the nutmeg state.

=== Regional finals ===
March 29, 2025; 4:00 pm	(2) Boston University	3–2 (OT) (1–1, 0–0, 1–1, 1–0)	(4) Cornell	Huntington Center; Attendance: 6,453

Game reference

Mikhail Yegorov
Goalies
Ian Shane
Referees:
Eric Frank
Chris Williams
Linesmen:
Bruce Vida Jr.
Nick Huff

	0–1	07:35 – Ryan Walsh (17) (Bancroft, Rego)
(C. Hutson) Matt Copponi (6) – 08:47	1–1
(Greene, Q. Hutson) Cole Hutson (14) – PP – 40:34	2–1
	2–2	54:30 – Jack O'Leary (8) (Rego, Mack)
(Greene, Lachance) Quinn Hutson (23) – GW – 66:25	3–2

8 min
Penalties
9 min
43
Shots
39

Game summary
The match began fast with both teams playing to form. Boston University went on the attack while the Cornell defense held them back. Just two minutes into the game, Brandon Svoboda was called for tripping to give the Big Red the first power play of the game. Cornell was very deliberate on their man-advantage, moving the puck slowly. This allowed BU to hold their formation and kill off the penalty with relative ease. As soon as Svoboda left the box, BU went right back on the attack and was able to draw their own power play due to a tripping by Hank Kempf. The Terriers looked much more comfortable with their man-advantage, passing and skating with aplomb, but Cornell was equally at home defending and the Big Red were able to prevent any good scoring chances. Right after the penalty, Cornell, rushed up the ice on a 3-on-2 and Dalton Bancroft threw a shot on goal. Mikhail Yegorov easily stopped it with his blocker but the puck bounced out, hit Ryan Walsh and deflected into the net. The referee immediately waved off the goal for being directed in with a glove but Mike Schafer challenged the call. After the review the call was reversed as the puck had hit Walsh in the hip instead of the hand and Cornell was awarded the first goal of the game. Undeterred, BU got back on the attack and a minute later Cole Hutson carried the puck into the Cornell end. He ended up losing control but Matt Copponi was able to snag the loose puck and put it on goal. Ian Shane made the initial save but the rubber bounced back, and Kempf accidentally kicked it into his own net. After the two quick goals, the two teams began exchanging rushes with neither able to establish much offensive zone time. As the period progresses, Cornell began to tilt the ice towards Yegorov but the Terriers collapsed down to their goal and didn't give the Big Red any shots in tight. After a potential tripping call by BU was let go by the referees, the Terriers were called for their second penalty when Jack Hughes slashed Charlie Major's stick. Cornell was aided on their second power play by failed clears but Yegorov made a couple of key save to keep the score tied. After the penalty expired, Cornell continued to press in the BU end and got a few good looks on goal. The Terriers' defense pressured the Big Red, forcing them to move the puck but they were unable to cause a turnover. Yegorov was again forced to make a save and the two sides devolved into a bit of roughhousing afterwards. During the exchange, the refs decided to pause to make an official review of the play to see if there was a penalty for grabbing the face mask. After a lengthy break, Walsh was handed a 5-minute major to give one of the best power plays in the nation a glorious opportunity. The Terriers were able to produce a few great chances but Shane was equal to the task and the score remained tied. With just seconds left in the first period, Devin Kaplan took a slashing call on Cornell's clearing attempt and gave the Big Red a 2-minute reprieve for the start of the second.

With some extra space on the ice during 4-on-4 play, neither side looked particularly comfortable with mistakes being made at both ends of the ice. After two minutes of a relatively slow pace, Cornell was able to kill off the final minute of the major and then restart their forecheck. Though the Terriers turned the puck over in their own zone, their speed enabled them to thwart the Big Red's scoring attempts. Boston University was eventually to reply in kind and Hughes had a point-black shot from the slot but he fired the puck right into Shane's glove. Cornell continued to ramp up the pressure, stealing the puck from the Terriers every chance they could get and then counterattacking up the ice. BU managed to get back in time to stop several chances while Yegorov stopped what little leaked through. After the midpoint of the game, Cole Eiserman had a shot an a wide-open net but chipped the puck over the net. At the 5-minute mark, Jacob Kraft broke in on Yegorov and bumped into the netminder after he made a save. After the whistle, Kraft was shoved to the ice by Shane Lachance but no penalty was called. Both teams were getting chances on goal but the puck was spending most of its time in the BU end. This was due to Cornell being able to pounce on seemingly every loose puck in their own end and then clearing the zone before the Terriers could force a turnover. Near the end of the period, Cornell began to exhibit some offensive talent and a brilliant pass found Ondřej Pšenička in front of the net but Yegorov was able to make the save. BU countered and long pass up ice found Jack Harvey for a breakaway his five-hole attempt was stopped by Shane. Just as the period was winding down, Bancroft gave Harvey a tug with his free hand behind the net and was called for holding. As the period expired before Cornel could touch the puck, the entire power play would occur at the start of the third.

It too just over 30 seconds for Cole Hutson to fire the puck in off the far post through a razor-thin gap for a highlight-reel goal. The action was up and down for the next several minutes but neither defense surrendered much in the way of scoring chances. With around 14 to play, a failed clear by BU allowed Cornell to get the puck to the front of the net but the Terriers were able to clear before Cornell could fins the puck. On the counterattack, Lachance and Quinn Hutson were nearly able to slide the puck past a sprawling Shane bit the Cornell goalie was able to get a quick whistle. The play continued to see-saw up and down the ice but BU was able to play a little more defense than they had earlier and prevent Cornell from setting up in the offensive zone. Just after the middle of the period, the Big Red were finally able to establish themselves in the BU end and ended up drawing a tripping call from Copponi. The BU forward argued the call afterwards but was not handed a misconduct. BU attacked the Cornell players on the power play, forcing the Big Red to constantly move the puck. Though that resulted in several miscues by Cornell, they were still able to generate several chances but none found their mark. Just after the penalty expired, Jack O'Leary was able to get the puck in the high slot and he fired it against the grain, off the post for the tying goal. 30 seconds later, a bad turnover in the Cornell end led to a tremendous chance for Hughes but Shane made a magnificent leg save to keep his team in the game. With both teams searching for the winner, the game opened up in the final 4 minutes but both defenses remained on guard. BU was able to get into the Cornell end with a few minutes to play and Cole Hutson attempted to replicate his earlier goal on a nearly-identical play but the puck was kept out. Cornell then carried the play up the ice and was able to get an offensive zone draw off of an icing. With 13 seconds left, Cornell won a pair of draws and Major was able to get hard show on goal but Yegorov made the save and the two teams headed into overtime.

Boston University was first off the hop, getting a solid scoring chance in the first 15 seconds. After Shane made the save, Cornell rushed into the BU end and got a pair of looks at Yegorov before the defenses were able to calm things down. BU was able to get an offensive attack going but tight checking from Cornell kept them to the outside and allowed the Big Red to clear the puck. An miss by Eiserman from a sharp angle careened off the glass and allowed Cornell to get a chance after a long shift. After BU get back on the attack they were able to move the puck along the wall and keep it away from Cornell long enough for Quinn Hutson to fire a shot from the point that managed to find its way through a sea of bodies and end the game.

== Ranking ==
=== USCHO ===
Team	Pre	1	2	3	4	5	6	7	8	9	10	11	13	14	15	16	17	18	19	20	21	22	23	24	25	Final
Brown	NR	NR	NR	NR	NR	NR	NR	NR	NR	NR	NR	NR	NR	NR	NR	NR	NR	NR	NR	NR	NR	NR	NR	NR	NR	NR
Clarkson	NR	NR	NR	NR	NR	NR	NR	19	20	20	20	20	20	19	20	20	NR	NR	NR	19	19	19	18	18	19	20
Colgate	NR	NR	NR	NR	NR	NR	NR	NR	NR	NR	NR	NR	NR	NR	NR	NR	NR	NR	NR	NR	NR	NR	NR	NR	NR	NR
Cornell	9	7	8	8	9	6	6	8	11	12	14	16	16	18	NR	NR	NR	NR	NR	NR	NR	NR	NR	NR	16	12
Dartmouth	NR	NR	NR	NR	NR	NR	17	16	15	13	17	17	17	NR	NR	NR	NR	NR	NR	NR	NR	NR	NR	NR	NR	NR
Harvard	NR	NR	NR	NR	NR	NR	20	NR	NR	NR	NR	NR	NR	NR	NR	NR	NR	NR	NR	NR	NR	NR	NR	NR	NR	NR
Princeton	NR	NR	NR	NR	NR	NR	NR	NR	NR	NR	NR	NR	NR	NR	NR	NR	NR	NR	NR	NR	NR	NR	NR	NR	NR	NR
Quinnipiac	8	8	7	11	14	15	19	18	18	18	18	18	18	20	16	15	14	14	15	14	13	13	13	12	11	15
Rensselaer	NR	NR	NR	NR	NR	NR	NR	NR	NR	NR	NR	NR	NR	NR	NR	NR	NR	NR	NR	NR	NR	NR	NR	NR	NR	NR
St. Lawrence	NR	NR	NR	NR	NR	NR	NR	NR	NR	NR	NR	NR	NR	NR	NR	NR	NR	NR	NR	NR	NR	NR	NR	NR	NR	NR
Union	NR	NR	NR	NR	NR	NR	NR	NR	NR	NR	NR	NR	NR	NR	NR	NR	NR	NR	NR	NR	NR	NR	NR	NR	NR	NR
Yale	NR	NR	NR	NR	NR	NR	NR	NR	NR	NR	NR	NR	NR	NR	NR	NR	NR	NR	NR	NR	NR	NR	NR	NR	NR	NR

Note: USCHO did not release a poll in week 12 or 26.

=== USA Hockey ===
Team	Pre	1	2	3	4	5	6	7	8	9	10	11	13	14	15	16	17	18	19	20	21	22	23	24	25	26	Final
Brown	NR	NR	NR	NR	NR	NR	NR	NR	NR	NR	NR	NR	NR	NR	NR	NR	NR	NR	NR	NR	NR	NR	NR	NR	NR	NR	NR
Clarkson	NR	NR	NR	NR	NR	NR	NR	19	19	20	19	20	19	19	20	NR	NR	NR	NR	19	19	19	17	18	18	19	19
Colgate	NR	NR	NR	NR	NR	NR	NR	NR	NR	NR	NR	NR	NR	NR	NR	NR	NR	NR	19	NR	NR	NR	NR	NR	NR	NR	NR
Cornell	9	7	7	8	8	6	5	7	11	12	14	17	16	20	NR	20	NR	NR	NR	NR	20	NR	20	19	16	12	11
Dartmouth	NR	NR	NR	NR	NR	NR	16	14	13	13	16	15	17	NR	NR	NR	19	NR	NR	NR	NR	NR	NR	NR	NR	NR	NR
Harvard	NR	NR	NR	NR	NR	NR	NR	NR	NR	NR	NR	NR	NR	NR	NR	NR	NR	NR	NR	NR	NR	NR	NR	NR	NR	NR	NR
Princeton	NR	NR	NR	NR	NR	NR	NR	NR	NR	NR	NR	NR	NR	NR	NR	NR	NR	NR	NR	NR	NR	NR	NR	NR	NR	NR	NR
Quinnipiac	7	8	8	10	13	15	NR	18	18	18	16	18	17	18	15	15	14	14	14	14	12	12	12	11	12	14	13
Rensselaer	NR	NR	NR	NR	NR	NR	NR	NR	NR	NR	NR	NR	NR	NR	NR	NR	NR	NR	NR	NR	NR	NR	NR	NR	NR	NR	NR
St. Lawrence	NR	NR	NR	NR	NR	NR	NR	NR	NR	NR	NR	NR	NR	NR	NR	NR	NR	NR	NR	NR	NR	NR	NR	NR	NR	NR	NR
Union	NR	NR	NR	NR	NR	20	NR	NR	NR	NR	NR	NR	NR	NR	NR	NR	NR	NR	NR	NR	NR	NR	NR	NR	NR	NR	NR
Yale	NR	NR	NR	NR	NR	NR	NR	NR	NR	NR	NR	NR	NR	NR	NR	NR	NR	NR	NR	NR	NR	NR	NR	NR	NR	NR	NR

Note: USA Hockey did not release a poll in week 12.

=== Pairwise ===
Team	1	2	3	4	5	6	7	8	9	10	11	13	14	15	16	17	18	19	20	21	22	23	24	Final
Brown	28	57	59	59	63	63	63	53	40	42	43	37	51	53	51	45	45	42	41	40	42	42	42	42
Clarkson	3	19	38	29	33	25	17	26	27	21	24	22	19	24	26	31	32	27	21	18	19	20	19	20
Colgate	28	45	53	38	47	46	29	24	38	31	32	31	34	29	26	25	21	18	25	25	21	24	29	29
Cornell	28	57	59	59	8	5	8	16	15	25	22	22	27	29	20	20	25	33	20	21	23	21	19	17
Dartmouth	28	57	59	59	2	3	4	3	4	15	16	18	24	23	20	19	23	21	28	30	24	23	21	22
Harvard	28	57	59	59	62	13	30	33	32	43	44	43	49	42	42	38	43	45	41	44	39	39	38	38
Princeton	28	57	59	59	63	48	24	47	29	26	25	20	32	40	43	42	36	39	43	44	42	42	42	42
Quinnipiac	28	16	6	24	19	32	20	19	16	17	17	15	17	15	14	13	11	15	14	13	13	13	12	12
Rensselaer	28	29	21	34	29	37	44	52	51	53	53	53	48	46	49	49	47	48	49	47	49	51	50	50
St. Lawrence	1	14	29	51	57	57	61	63	62	58	56	57	57	57	59	57	55	55	54	54	54	55	54	54
Union	19	15	14	13	13	21	30	37	28	31	40	42	34	37	41	40	40	35	34	33	34	33	37	37
Yale	28	57	59	59	59	26	52	54	53	52	52	45	53	52	53	51	54	54	54	54	56	55	56	56

Note: teams ranked in the top-10 automatically qualify for the NCAA tournament. Teams ranked 11-16 can qualify based upon conference tournament results.

== Awards ==
=== NCAA ===
AHCA All-American Teams
East First Team	Position
Ayrton Martino, Clarkson	F
East Second Team	Position
Trey Taylor, Clarkson	D

=== ECAC Hockey ===
Award		Recipient
Player of the Year		Ayrton Martino, Clarkson
Best Defensive Forward		Jack Ricketts, Quinnipiac
Best Defensive Defenseman		Trey Taylor, Clarkson
Rookie of the Year		Michael Neumeier, Colgate
Ken Dryden Award		Ethan Langenegger, Clarkson
Student-Athlete of the Year		Mason Waite, St. Lawrence
Wayne Dean Sportsmanship Award		
Tim Taylor Award		Jean-François Houle, Clarkson
Most Outstanding Player in Tournament		Ian Shane, Cornell
All-ECAC Hockey Teams
First Team	Position	Second Team
Ethan Langenegger, Clarkson	G	Lawton Zacher, Brown
CJ Foley, Dartmouth	D	Tommy Bergsland, Colgate
Trey Taylor, Clarkson	D	Tristan Sarsland, Clarkson
Brett Chorske, Colgate	F	Dalton Bancroft, Cornell
Ayrton Martino, Clarkson	F	Mason Marcellus, Quinnipiac
Ellis Rickwood, Clarkson	F	Jack Ricketts, Quinnipiac
Third Team	Position	Rookie Team
Kyle Chauvette, Union	G	Ben Charette, Harvard
John Prokop, Union	D	Michael Neumeier, Colgate
Tim Rego, Cornell	D	Tate Taylor, Clarkson
Brandon Buhr, Union	F	Ben Muthersbaugh, Union
Brendan Gorman, Princeton	F	Brian Nicholas, Brown
Tyler Kopff, Brown	F	Mick Thompson, Harvard

== 2025 NHL entry draft ==
Round	Pick	Player	College	NHL team
4	99	Trenten Bennett ^{†}	St. Lawrence	New Jersey Devils
4	122	Alex Huang ^{†}	Harvard	Nashville Predators
5	144	Ethan Wyttenbach ^{†}	Quinnipiac	Calgary Flames
5	145	Alexis Cournoyer ^{†}	Cornell	Montreal Canadiens
5	154	Jordan Charron ^{†}	St. Lawrence	Pittsburgh Penguins
6	176	Aidan Lane ^{†}	Harvard	Calgary Flames
7	204	Grayden Robertson-Palmer ^{†}	Dartmouth	Detroit Red Wings
7	207	Matthew Lansing ^{†}	Quinnipiac	Vancouver Canucks
7	210	Richard Gallant ^{†}	Harvard	San Jose Sharks

† incoming freshman in 2025 or 2026
