= 2024–25 Princeton Tigers men's ice hockey season =

- Conference: 9th ECAC Hockey
- Home ice: Hobey Baker Memorial Rink

Rankings
- USCHO: NR
- USA Hockey: NR

Record
- Overall: 12–15–3
- Conference: 7–12–3
- Home: 6–9–2
- Road: 6–6–1

Coaches and captains
- Head coach: Ben Syer
- Assistant coaches: Tommy Davis; Shane Talarico; Connor Jones
- Captain(s): Noah de la Durantaye; David Jacobs
- Alternate captain: Brendan Gorman

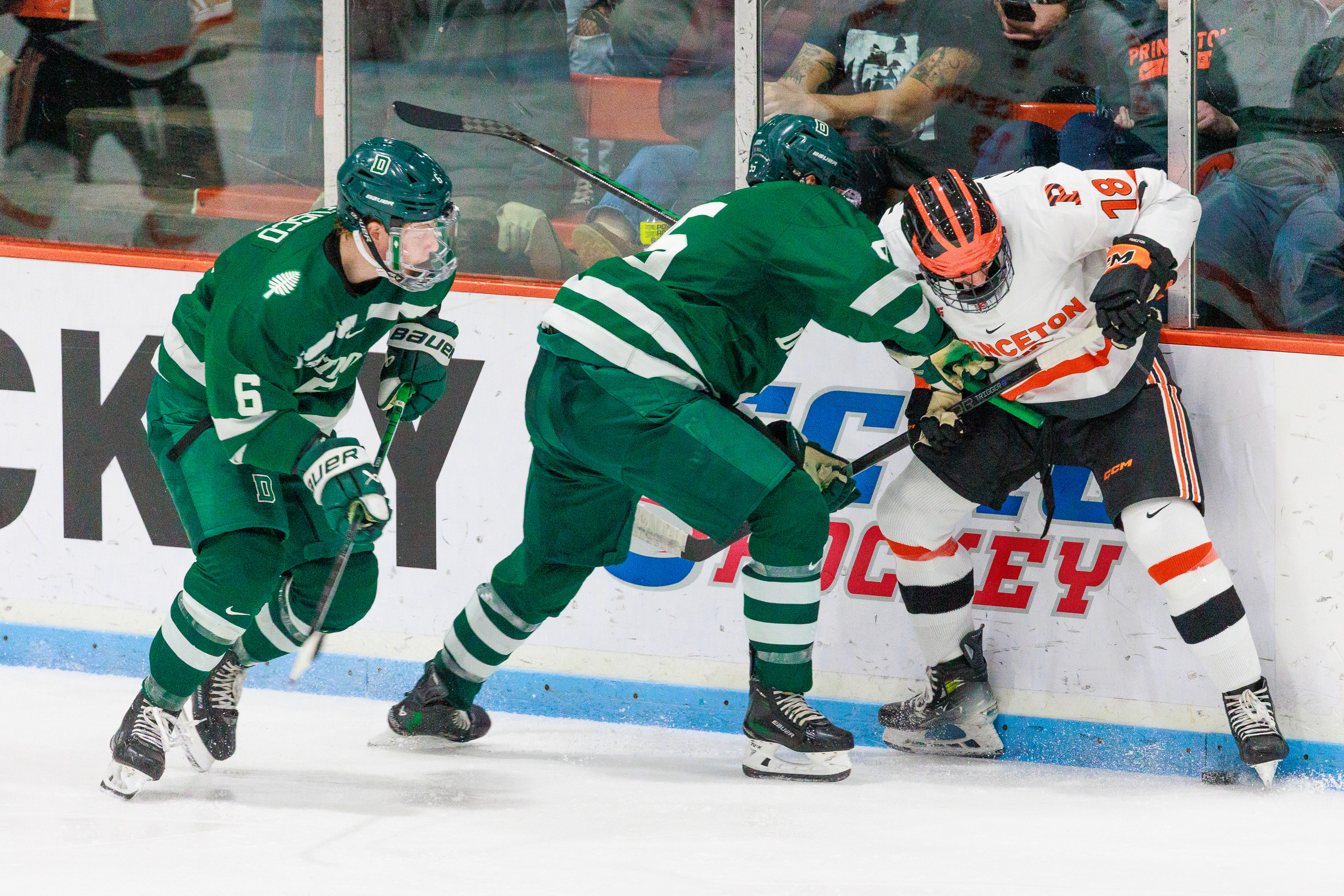
The Tigers lost to Dartmouth on November 9

The 2024–25 Princeton Tigers Men's ice hockey season was the 122nd season of play for the program and the 63rd in ECAC Hockey. The Tigers represented Princeton University in the 2024–25 NCAA Division I men's ice hockey season, played their home games at the Hobey Baker Memorial Rink and were coached by Ben Syer in his 1st season.

== Season ==
After compiling just one winning campaign in nine seasons, Princeton elected to made a head coaching change and brought in Ben Syer, who had spent the previous thirteen years as an assistant with Cornell. With relatively few changes to the roster, Syer's chief issue was installing his playing system with the new club. There was a predictable learning curve early in the year with the Tigers winning just once in their first six games. A lack of scoring and inconsistent play in goal were the primary causes but the defense was able to limit the opposition to a relatively small number of shots.

With the season shaping up to be a rebuilding year, the Tigers met tournament-hopeful Ohio State at the end of February and pulled off two improbably victories. Arthur Smith had not done well in his first start of the season but whatever issues he had appeared to have been resolved when he got his second go around. The sophomore netminder stopped 66 of 68 shots that weekend while Jake Manfre recorded 4 points to change the course of Princeton's season. The stellar netminding continued for the next month, though due the winter break only three games were played in December. The offense was also able to score at a consistent, if modest, basis during the Tiger's run. By the beginning of January Princeton was not only above .500 but they had even climbed up to #20 in the PairWise rankings, giving them a good opportunity to earn an at-large bid.

Unfortunately, once January rolled around, Smith's play came back down to earth. That, coupled with the offense drying up, caused the team to follow their 5-game winning streak with six consecutive losses. In desperation, the team turned to Ethan Pearson, who was able to right the ship for a short time and lead the team to another small streak of four victories. However, that short burst was immediately followed by another drought that sent the roller-coaster of a season careening downwards as the postseason was approaching. Princeton was able to win its final two games on their schedule but their Jekyll and Hyde performance throughout the season, there was no telling which Tiger team would show up in the playoffs.

As it turned out, the Tiger's weak second half caused them to drop to 9th in the standings and forced the team on the road for the First Round of the ECAC tournament. They were set against Brown, who had a fairly similar season to the Tigers, and those commonalities showed in their match. Both teams had low-scoring offenses that resulted in each side failing to convert on three power play opportunities in the game. Either side could only muster a single goal heading into the third period with both squads well aware that the next goal could decide the match. Brown was able to pull ahead in the first half of the third and then hold Princeton off for much of the next 10 minutes. With time winding down, Pearson was pulled for an extra attacker but all that served to do was allow the Bears to collect an empty-net goal and effectively seal the match. Princeton was able to score afterwards, but with only 4 seconds remaining on the clock it was too little too late and the Tigers' season was over.

== Departures ==
Player	Position	Nationality	Cause
Joe Berg	Forward	United States	Graduation (retired)
Nick Carabin	Defenseman	United States	Graduate transfer to Connecticut
Mike Kennedy	Defenseman	United States	Graduation (signed with Coventry Blaze)
Mackenzie Merriman	Forward	Canada	Graduation (retired)
Ian Murphy	Forward	United States	Graduate transfer to Notre Dame
Adam Robbins	Forward	United States	Graduation (signed with Tahoe Knight Monsters)
Nick Seitz	Forward	United States	Graduation (signed with Coventry Blaze)

== Recruiting ==
Player	Position	Nationality	Age	Notes
Julian Facchinelli	Forward	Canada	20	Woodbridge, ON
Drew Garzone	Forward	United States	20	Dover, MA
Kai Greaves	Defenseman	Canada	21	Cambridge, ON
Miles Gunty	Forward	United States	20	Bethesda, MD
Jake Manfre	Forward	United States	20	Smithtown, NY
Luc Pelletier	Forward	United States	21	Courtenay, BC
Patrick Reilly	Defenseman	United States	20	Avon, NJ

== Roster ==
As of September 6, 2024.

No.	Nat.	Player	Class	Pos	Height	Weight	DoB	Hometown	Previous team	NHL rights
1	(United States)	Arthur Smith	Sophomore	G	6' 4" (1.93 m)	205 lb (93 kg)	2004-04-30	Farmington, Connecticut	Lone Star Brahmas (NAHL)	—
3	(United States)	Pat Reilly	Freshman	D	6' 1" (1.85 m)	181 lb (82 kg)	2004-09-27	Avon, New Jersey	Coquitlam Express (BCHL)	—
4	(United States)	David Ma	Senior	D	5' 11" (1.8 m)	180 lb (82 kg)	2002-06-22	Yonkers, New York	Chicago Steel (USHL)	—
6	(Canada)	Ian Devlin	Sophomore	D	6' 2" (1.88 m)	210 lb (95 kg)	2002-01-07	Toronto, Ontario	Coquitlam Express (BCHL)	—
7	(Canada)	Kai Daniells	Sophomore	F	6' 0" (1.83 m)	185 lb (84 kg)	2003-03-07	Whistler, British Columbia	Nanaimo Clippers (BCHL)	—
8	(United States)	Tyler Rubin	Junior	D	5' 10" (1.78 m)	175 lb (79 kg)	2003-01-10	Natick, Massachusetts	West Kelowna Warriors (BCHL)	—
10	(United States)	Alex Konovalov	Senior	F	5' 10" (1.78 m)	180 lb (82 kg)	2000-11-12	Basking Ridge, New Jersey	Lone Star Brahmas (NAHL)	—
11	(United States)	Jayden Sison	Junior	F	5' 9" (1.75 m)	185 lb (84 kg)	2003-01-27	Paoli, Pennsylvania	Coquitlam Express (BCHL)	—
12	(United States)	Jake Manfre	Freshman	F	6' 0" (1.83 m)	201 lb (91 kg)	2004-04-22	Smithtown, New York	Coquitlam Express (BCHL)	—
13	(United States)	Drew Garzone	Freshman	F	6' 1" (1.85 m)	190 lb (86 kg)	2004-05-30	Dover, Massachusetts	Coquitlam Express (BCHL)	—
14	(Canada)	Carson Buydens	Sophomore	F	6' 3" (1.91 m)	185 lb (84 kg)	2004-03-10	Gladstone, Manitoba	North Iowa Bulls (BCHL)	—
15	(Canada)	Julian Facchinelli	Freshman	F	6' 0" (1.83 m)	181 lb (82 kg)	2004-07-04	Woodbridge, Ontario	Vernon Vipers (BCHL)	—
16	(United States)	Brendan Gorman (A)	Junior	F	6' 0" (1.83 m)	175 lb (79 kg)	2003-02-17	Arlington, Massachusetts	St. Sebastian's (USHS–MA)	—
17	(United States)	Miles Gunty	Freshman	F	5' 10" (1.78 m)	190 lb (86 kg)	2004-02-21	Bethesda, Maryland	Youngstown Phantoms (USHL)	—
18	(United States)	Joshua Karnish	Sophomore	F	5' 11" (1.8 m)	175 lb (79 kg)	2003-08-07	Marlton, New Jersey	Cedar Rapids RoughRiders (USHL)	—
19	(United States)	Jack Cronin	Senior	F	5' 11" (1.8 m)	185 lb (84 kg)	2001-03-31	South Hamilton, Massachusetts	Minnesota Magicians (NAHL)	—
20	(Canada)	Kevin Anderson	Junior	F	5' 11" (1.8 m)	175 lb (79 kg)	2003-09-15	Regina, Saskatchewan	Notre Dame Hounds (SJHL)	—
21	(United States)	Michael Young	Sophomore	F	5' 11" (1.8 m)	185 lb (84 kg)	2002-08-28	Kings Park, New York	New Jersey Jr. Titans (NAHL)	—
22	(Canada)	Noah de la Durantaye (C)	Senior	D	6' 1" (1.85 m)	205 lb (93 kg)	2000-05-27	Montreal, Quebec	Coquitlam Express (BCHL)	—
23	(Canada)	Kai Greaves	Freshman	D	6' 2" (1.88 m)	205 lb (93 kg)	2003-03-04	Cambridge, Ontario	Prince George Spruce Kings (BCHL)	—
24	(United States)	David Jacobs (C)	Junior	F	5' 10" (1.78 m)	180 lb (82 kg)	2001-09-26	Needham, Massachusetts	Cowichan Valley Capitals (BCHL)	—
25	(United States)	Nick Marciano	Junior	D	6' 1" (1.85 m)	205 lb (93 kg)	2002-05-19	Greenwich, Connecticut	Prince George Spruce Kings (BCHL)	—
26	(Canada)	Luc Pelletier	Freshman	F	6' 4" (1.93 m)	205 lb (93 kg)	2003-09-07	Courtenay, British Columbia	Victoria Grizzlies (BCHL)	—
27	(United States)	Jaxson Ezman	Junior	F	6' 1" (1.85 m)	185 lb (84 kg)	2002-12-22	Middleton, Wisconsin	Dubuque Fighting Saints (USHL)	—
28	(Canada)	Brendan Wang	Junior	D	5' 11" (1.8 m)	180 lb (82 kg)	2002-02-08	Burnaby, British Columbia	Fort McMurray Oil Barons (AJHL)	—
30	(United States)	Conor Callaghan	Sophomore	G	6' 0" (1.83 m)	185 lb (84 kg)	2003-03-02	Ho-Ho-Kus, New Jersey	Muskegon Lumberjacks (USHL)	—
31	(Canada)	Ethan Pearson	Senior	G	6' 2" (1.88 m)	190 lb (86 kg)	2002-07-30	Fredericton, New Brunswick	Mount St. Charles (USHS–RI)	—

== Standings ==
2024–25 ECAC Hockey Standings
	Conference record										Overall record					
	GP	W	L	T	OTW	OTL	SW	PTS	GF	GA	GP	W	L	T	GF	GA
#15 Quinnipiac †	22	16	5	1	2	3	0	50	79	42	38	24	12	2	135	83
#20 Clarkson	22	15	6	1	2	1	0	45	74	47	39	24	12	3	121	87
Colgate	22	13	7	2	2	2	1	42	80	65	36	18	15	3	114	116
Union	22	12	8	2	0	0	2	40	67	61	36	19	14	3	112	109
Dartmouth	22	12	9	1	0	2	0	39	70	52	33	18	13	2	110	84
#12 Cornell *	22	10	8	4	1	0	3	36	69	53	36	19	11	6	112	82
Harvard	22	9	10	3	2	2	1	31	56	56	33	13	17	3	85	97
Brown	22	9	11	2	3	0	2	28	53	63	32	14	15	3	79	85
Princeton	22	7	12	3	2	2	1	25	55	73	30	12	15	3	71	86
Rensselaer	22	7	15	0	0	2	0	23	57	82	35	12	21	2	101	131
Yale	22	5	14	3	1	1	1	19	52	80	30	6	21	3	67	121
St. Lawrence	22	5	15	2	1	1	1	18	43	81	35	9	24	2	71	121
Championship: March 22, 2025 † indicates conference regular season champion (Cleary Cup) * indicates conference tournament champion (Whitelaw Cup); Rankings: USCHO.com Top 20 Poll

== Schedule and results ==
Date	Time	Opponent^{#}	Rank^{#}	Site	TV	Decision	Result	Attendance	Record
Exhibition
October 26	7:00 pm	Waterloo*		Hobey Baker Memorial Rink • Princeton, New Jersey (Exhibition)	ESPN+	Pearson	W 6–0		
Regular Season
November 8	7:00 pm	Harvard		Hobey Baker Memorial Rink • Princeton, New Jersey	ESPN+	Pearson	L 3–4	2,352	0–1–0 (0–1–0)
November 9	7:00 pm	Dartmouth		Hobey Baker Memorial Rink • Princeton, New Jersey	ESPN+	Smith	L 1–5	1,426	0–2–0 (0–2–0)
November 15	7:00 pm	at Yale		Ingalls Rink • New Haven, Connecticut	ESPN+	Pearson	W 4–1	1,742	1–2–0 (1–2–0)
November 16	7:00 pm	at Brown		Meehan Auditorium • Providence, Rhode Island	ESPN+	Pearson	T 1–1 ^{SOL}	1,095	1–2–1 (1–2–1)
November 22	7:00 pm	at Colgate		Class of 1965 Arena • Hamilton, New York	ESPN+	Pearson	L 1–2	815	1–3–1 (1–3–1)
November 23	7:00 pm	at #8 Cornell		Lynah Rink • Ithaca, New York	ESPN+	Pearson	L 0–5	4,267	1–4–1 (1–4–1)
November 29	7:00 pm	#12 Ohio State*		Hobey Baker Memorial Rink • Princeton, New Jersey	ESPN+	Smith	W 3–1	1,366	2–4–1
November 30	7:00 pm	#12 Ohio State*		Hobey Baker Memorial Rink • Princeton, New Jersey	ESPN+	Smith	W 3–1	1,917	3–4–1
December 6	7:00 pm	Union		Hobey Baker Memorial Rink • Princeton, New Jersey	ESPN+	Smith	W 2–1	1,384	4–4–1 (2–4–1)
December 7	7:00 pm	Rensselaer		Hobey Baker Memorial Rink • Princeton, New Jersey	ESPN+	Smith	W 6–2	1,850	5–4–1 (3–4–1)
December 28	4:00 pm	at Army*		Tate Rink • West Point, New York	FloHockey	Smith	W 1–0	2,648	6–4–1
January 3	7:00 pm	New Hampshire*		Hobey Baker Memorial Rink • Princeton, New Jersey	ESPN+	Smith	L 0–3	2,020	6–5–1
January 4	4:00 pm	New Hampshire*		Hobey Baker Memorial Rink • Princeton, New Jersey	ESPN+	Pearson	L 3–4	2,057	6–6–1
January 10	7:00 pm	#20 Quinnipiac		Hobey Baker Memorial Rink • Princeton, New Jersey	ESPN+	Smith	L 2–4	1,935	6–7–1 (3–5–1)
January 11	7:00 pm	at #20 Quinnipiac		M&T Bank Arena • Hamden, Connecticut	ESPN+	Smith	L 0–3	2,995	6–8–1 (3–6–1)
January 17	7:00 pm	Cornell		Hobey Baker Memorial Rink • Princeton, New Jersey	ESPN+, SNY	Smith	L 2–6	2,432	6–9–1 (3–7–1)
January 18	7:00 pm	Colgate		Hobey Baker Memorial Rink • Princeton, New Jersey	ESPN+	Smith	L 4–6	2,050	6–10–1 (3–8–1)
January 25	7:00 pm	Bentley*		Hobey Baker Memorial Rink • Princeton, New Jersey	ESPN+	Pearson	W 3–1	1,586	7–10–1
January 26	4:00 pm	Bentley*		Hobey Baker Memorial Rink • Princeton, New Jersey	ESPN+	Pearson	W 1–0 ^{OT}	1,337	8–10–1
January 31	7:00 pm	at Harvard		Bright-Landry Hockey Center • Boston, Massachusetts	ESPN+	Pearson	W 4–3 ^{OT}	2,603	9–10–1 (4–8–1)
February 1	7:00 pm	at Dartmouth		Thompson Arena • Hanover, New Hampshire	ESPN+	Pearson	W 3–1	4,667	10–10–1 (5–8–1)
February 7	7:00 pm	Clarkson		Hobey Baker Memorial Rink • Princeton, New Jersey	ESPN+	Pearson	L 1–4	1,558	10–11–1 (5–9–1)
February 8	7:00 pm	St. Lawrence		Hobey Baker Memorial Rink • Princeton, New Jersey	ESPN+	Smith	T 4–4 ^{SOL}	1,725	10–11–2 (5–9–2)
February 14	7:00 pm	at Rensselaer		Houston Field House • Troy, New York	ESPN+	Pearson	L 1–4	1,403	10–12–2 (5–10–2)
February 15	7:00 pm	at Union		Achilles Rink • Schenectady, New York	ESPN+	Smith	L 4–7	1,625	10–13–2 (5–11–2)
February 21	7:00 pm	Brown		Hobey Baker Memorial Rink • Princeton, New Jersey	ESPN+	Pearson	L 2–3	1,648	10–14–2 (5–12–2)
February 22	7:00 pm	Yale		Hobey Baker Memorial Rink • Princeton, New Jersey	ESPN+	Pearson	T 2–2 ^{SOW}	2,111	10–14–3 (5–12–3)
February 28	7:00 pm	at St. Lawrence		Appleton Arena • Canton, New York	ESPN+	Pearson	W 4–2	1,200	11–14–3 (6–12–3)
March 1	7:00 pm	at #19 Clarkson		Cheel Arena • Potsdam, New York	ESPN+	Pearson	W 4–3 ^{OT}	2,712	12–14–3 (7–12–3)
ECAC Hockey Tournament
March 7	7:00 pm	at Brown*		Meehan Auditorium • Providence, Rhode Island (ECAC First Round)	ESPN+	Pearson	L 2–3	1,742	12–15–3
*Non-conference game. ^{#}Rankings from USCHO.com Poll. All times are in Eastern Time. Source:

== Scoring statistics ==
Name	Position	Games	Goals	Assists	Points	PIM
Brendan Gorman	C	30	12	14	26	12
Jake Manfre	F	30	8	9	17	12
Jaxson Ezman	F	30	7	8	15	28
Nick Marciano	D	30	4	10	14	4
David Jacobs	RW	26	3	11	14	0
David Ma	D	30	6	7	13	33
Alex Konovalov	F	27	3	8	11	6
Noah de la Durantaye	D	29	4	6	10	8
Miles Gunty	F	29	3	7	10	4
Kevin Anderson	F	28	5	4	9	27
Luc Pelletier	LW	29	3	5	8	35
Jayden Sison	RW	24	2	4	6	10
Tyler Rubin	D	17	2	3	5	12
Kai Daniells	F	18	2	2	4	2
Drew Garzone	C	25	1	3	4	6
Carson Buydens	C	29	1	3	4	24
Ian Devlin	D	30	1	3	4	12
Kai Greaves	D	29	2	1	3	2
Joshua Karnish	C/LW	29	1	2	3	19
Brendan Wang	D	25	1	1	2	2
Michael Young	F	11	0	2	2	0
Julian Facchinelli	RW	2	0	0	0	0
Patrick Reilly	D	9	0	0	0	2
Arthur Smith	G	13	0	0	0	0
Ethan Pearson	G	17	0	0	0	0
Bench	–	–	–	–	–	12
Total			71	113	184	272

== Goaltending statistics ==
Name	Games	Minutes	Wins	Losses	Ties	Goals against	Saves	Shut outs	SV %	GAA
Ethan Pearson	17	1031:37	7	8	2	40	418	1	.913	2.33
Arthur Smith	14	779:07	5	7	1	39	323	1	.892	3.00
Empty Net	-	14:26	-	-	-	7	-	-	-	-
Total	30	1825:10	12	15	3	86	741	2	.896	2.83

== Rankings ==
Poll	Week																											
Poll	Pre	1	2	3	4	5	6	7	8	9	10	11	12	13	14	15	16	17	18	19	20	21	22	23	24	25	26	27 (Final)
USCHO.com	NR	NR	NR	NR	NR	NR	NR	NR	NR	NR	NR	NR	–	NR	NR	NR	NR	NR	NR	NR	NR	NR	NR	NR	NR	NR	–	NR
USA Hockey	NR	NR	NR	NR	NR	NR	NR	NR	NR	NR	NR	NR	–	NR	NR	NR	NR	NR	NR	NR	NR	NR	NR	NR	NR	NR	NR	NR

Note: USCHO did not release a poll in week 12 or 26.
Note: USA Hockey did not release a poll in week 12.

== Awards and honors ==
Player	Award	Ref
Brendan Gorman	All-ECAC Hockey Third Team	
