= Ben Syer =

Canadian ice hockey coach

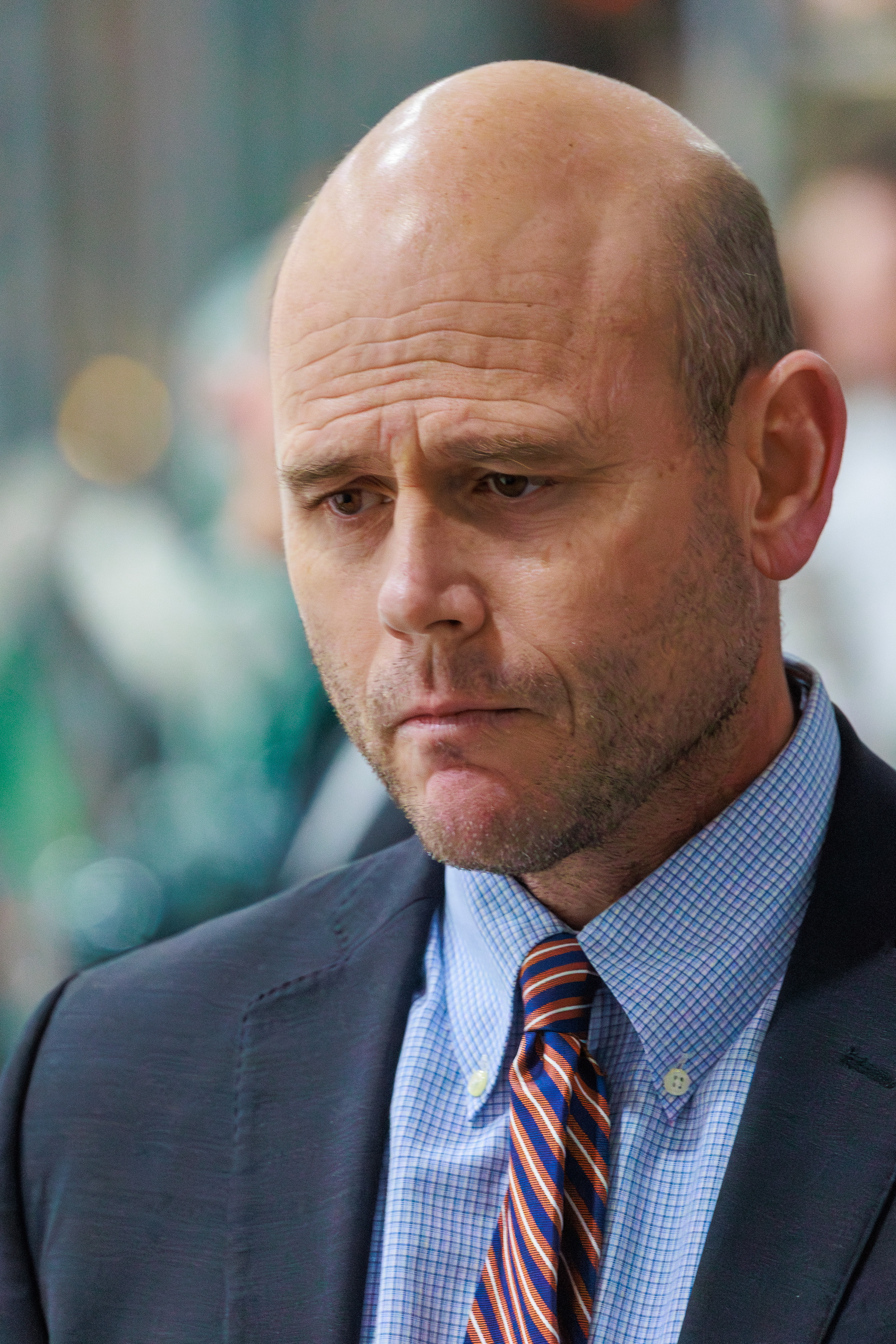

Current position
- Title: Head coach
- Team: Princeton
- Conference: ECAC Hockey

Biographical details
- Born: 1975 (age 50–51); Kitchener, Ontario, Canada
- Education: University of Western Ontario; Ohio University (MA)

Playing career
- 1993–1994: Kitchener Dutchmen
- 1994–1995: St. Thomas Stars
- Position: Left wing

Coaching career (HC unless noted)
- 1998–1999: North Middlesex Stars (asst.)
- 1999–2000: Ohio (grad. asst.)
- 2000–2011: Quinnipiac (asst.)
- 2011–2024: Cornell (asst.)
- 2024–present: Princeton

Head coaching record
- Overall: 12–15–3 (.450)

Accomplishments and honors

Awards
- 2018 Terry Flanagan Award

Ben Syer (born 1975) is a Canadian ice hockey coach and former player who is currently in charge of the program at Princeton.

== Career ==
Syer graduated from the University of Western Ontario in 1998 with an honors degree in urban development. Though he had played junior hockey, he was not a member of the team at his alma mater. He travelled south for grad school and attended Ohio University. While earning a Master's in physical education, Syer began his coaching career. He first worked for the North Middlesex Stars before joining the staff at Ohio. In 2000, Syer transitioned to Division I and joined Rand Pecknold's staff at Quinnipiac. Syer spent the next eleven years as an assistant and recruiting coordinator with the Bobcats and helped the team transition from Atlantic Hockey to ECAC Hockey. In 2011, Syer was hired by Cornell as an assistant and was given the responsibility of running the defense. Over a 13-year stretch, the Big Red possessed one of the best defensive teams in the nation and routinely finished in the top-10 for goal against. In 2018, Syer's team finished first in defensive acumen and he was named as the recipient of the Terry Flanagan Award the same year. After Cornell's second season as the best defensive team in 2024, Syer was named as the 18th head coach for Princeton, his first opportunity at running a program.

== Head coaching record ==
Record table
Season	Team	Overall	Conference	Standing	Postseason
Princeton Tigers (ECAC Hockey) (2024–present)
2024–25	Princeton	12–15–3	7–12–3	9th	ECAC First Round
Princeton:		12–15–3	7–12–3		
Total:		12–15–3			
National champion Postseason invitational champion Conference regular season champion Conference regular season and conference tournament champion Division regular season champion Division regular season and conference tournament champion Conference tournament champion

Awards and achievements
Preceded by Mike Guentzel	Terry Flanagan Award; 2017–18	Succeeded by Kevin Patrick
