= 2024–25 Colgate Raiders men's ice hockey season =

- Conference: 3rd ECAC Hockey
- Home ice: Class of 1965 Arena

Rankings
- USCHO: NR
- USA Hockey: NR

Record
- Overall: 18–15–3
- Conference: 13–7–2
- Home: 10–5–2
- Road: 8–10–1

Coaches and captains
- Head coach: Mike Harder
- Assistant coaches: Zach Badalamenti; Anthony Walsh
- Captain: Reid Irwin
- Alternate captain(s): Tommy Bergsland; Alex DiPaolo

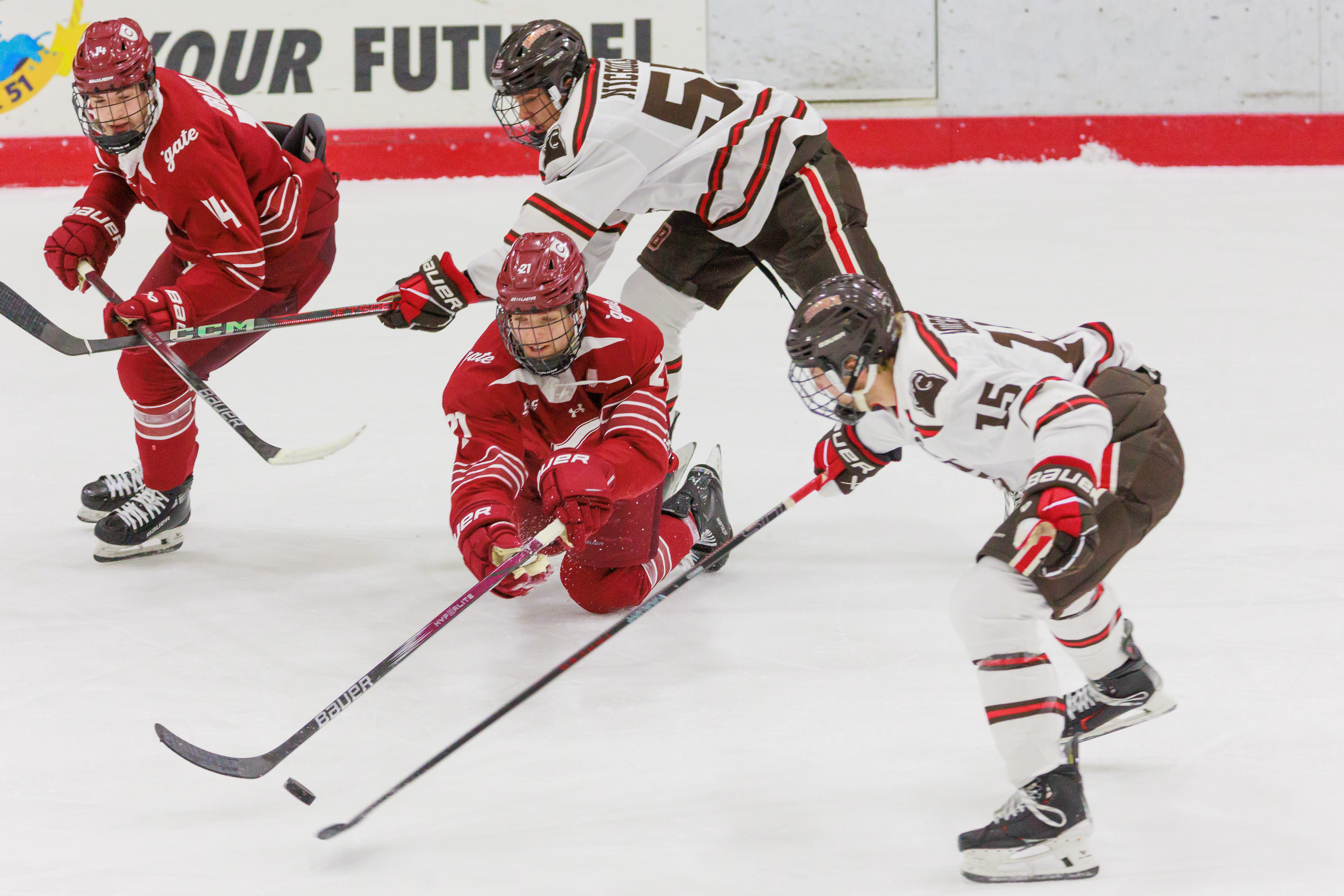
Sophomore Niko Rexine dives for the puck

The 2024–25 Colgate Raiders Men's ice hockey season was the 95th season of play for the program and the 64th in the ECAC Hockey conference. The Raiders represented Colgate University, played their home games at the Class of 1965 Arena and were coached by Mike Harder in his 2nd season.

== Season ==
Colgate's second season under Mike Harder was eerily similar to the first. With a virtually identical record in conference play the only real difference was this season they managed to defeat Long Island after having lost to the Sharks in 2024. Not only did the team finish third in ECAC Hockey again, but they also failed to take advantage of home playoff games and were swept out of the conference quarterfinals for the second year in a row. Even with several players changing between seasons, the team performed largely the same. Andrew Takacs took over as the primary starter from Carter Gylander and produced only marginally better numbers. Up front, Brett Chorske led the Raiders in scoring, finishing with totals only slightly better than Ross Mitton had the year before. For the season, the team averaged just over 3 goals per game, allowing approximately the same. While slightly worse than the year prior, there was no statical difference in the two figures.

This season demonstrated that Colgate could hold serve and retain its position as a solid program. However, one trend that continued out as the season went along was the poor attendance at Colgate's home games. Since the end of the COVID-19 pandemic, Colgate has struggled to attract crowds and routinely sees under 1,000 fans in attendance. Colgate finished the year 55th out of 64 teams in terms of average attendance and used just 48% of its seating capacity for the year.

== Departures ==
Player	Position	Nationality	Cause
Nick Anderson	Defenseman	United States	Graduate transfer to Massachusetts Lowell
Pierson Brandon	Defenseman	United States	Graduate transfer to Massachusetts Lowell
P. J. Garrett	Defenseman	United States	Graduation (retired)
Levi Glasman	Forward	Canada	Graduation (signed with Mechelen Golden Sharks)
Carter Gylander	Goaltender	Canada	Graduation (signed with Detroit Red Wings)
Ethan Manderville	Forward	United States	Graduation (signed with Indy Fuel)
Ryan McGuire	Forward	Canada	Transferred to Northeastern
Ross Mitton	Forward	United States	Graduate transfer to Maine
Sebastian Tamburro	Forward	Canada	Left program (retired)

== Recruiting ==
Player	Position	Nationality	Age	Notes
Jack Brandt	Forward	United States	20	Columbus, OH
Simone Dadiè	Forward	Italy	21	Brunico, ITA
Antonio Fernandez	Defenseman	United States	20	San Jose, CA; transfer from Colorado College
Brett Merner	Defenseman	Canada	20	Nanaimo, BC
Max Nagel	Forward	United States	20	West St. Paul, MN
Jacob Napier	Defenseman	United States	21	Lancaster, NY; transfer from Western Michigan
Michael Neumeier	Defenseman	Canada	21	Kerrobert, SK
Jack Olson	Goaltender	United States	21	St. Louis Park, MN
Ryan Spinale	Forward	United States	20	Plymouth, MA

== Roster ==
As of July 30, 2024.

No.	Nat.	Player	Class	Pos	Height	Weight	DoB	Hometown	Previous team	NHL rights
1	(United States)	Andrew Takacs	Junior	G	6' 2" (1.88 m)	190 lb (86 kg)	2001-02-27	Bowie, Maryland	New Jersey Titans (NAHL)	—
3	(Canada)	Michael Neumeier	Freshman	D	6' 2" (1.88 m)	203 lb (92 kg)	2003-02-27	Kerrobert, Saskatchewan	Bismarck Bobcats (NAHL)	—
4	(Canada)	Reid Irwin (C)	Graduate	D	6' 1" (1.85 m)	192 lb (87 kg)	1999-03-01	Victoria, British Columbia	Denver (NCHC)	—
5	(United States)	Jacob Napier	Sophomore	D	6' 2" (1.88 m)	190 lb (86 kg)	2003-03-31	Lancaster, New York	Western Michigan (NCHC)	—
6	(United States)	Bobby Metz	Junior	D	5' 9" (1.75 m)	178 lb (81 kg)	2001-08-20	Bloomfield Hills, Michigan	Minnesota Wilderness (NAHL)	—
7	(Canada)	Simon Labelle	Junior	F	5' 10" (1.78 m)	175 lb (79 kg)	2002-09-03	Ottawa, Ontario	Prince George Spruce Kings (BCHL)	—
9	(United States)	Nic Belpedio	Senior	D	5' 10" (1.78 m)	194 lb (88 kg)	2001-10-09	Skokie, Illinois	Waterloo Black Hawks (USHL)	—
10	(Italy)	Simone Dadiè	Freshman	F	6' 2" (1.88 m)	205 lb (93 kg)	2003-02-27	Brunico, Italy	Powell River Kings (BCHL)	—
11	(United States)	Antonio Fernandez	Sophomore	D	5' 8" (1.73 m)	179 lb (81 kg)	2003-10-11	San Jose, California	Colorado College (NCHC)	—
12	(Canada)	Daniel Panetta	Junior	F	5' 10" (1.78 m)	175 lb (79 kg)	2001-05-20	Belleville, Ontario	Salmon Arm Silverbacks (BCHL)	—
13	(United States)	Max Nagel	Freshman	F	5' 8" (1.73 m)	161 lb (73 kg)	2004-06-30	West St. Paul, Minnesota	Madison Capitols (USHL)	—
14	(United States)	Jack Brandt	Freshman	F	5' 10" (1.78 m)	170 lb (77 kg)	2004-06-14	Columbus, Ohio	Madison Capitols (USHL)	—
15	(United States)	Dom Foglia	Sophomore	D	6' 1" (1.85 m)	190 lb (86 kg)	2002-04-09	Tinton Falls, New Jersey	Philadelphia Rebels (NAHL)	—
16	(Canada)	Ryan Sullivan	Sophomore	F	6' 2" (1.88 m)	190 lb (86 kg)	2002-05-15	Calgary, Alberta	Camrose Kodiaks (AJHL)	—
18	(United States)	Ben Raymond	Senior	F	5' 11" (1.8 m)	180 lb (82 kg)	2001-08-22	Newton, Massachusetts	Powell River Kings (BCHL)	—
19	(United States)	Ryan Spinale	Freshman	F	6' 6" (1.98 m)	216 lb (98 kg)	2004-02-09	Plymouth, Massachusetts	Lincoln Stars (USHL)	—
21	(United States)	Niko Rexine	Sophomore	F	6' 2" (1.88 m)	195 lb (88 kg)	2002-06-20	Syracuse, New York	Muskegon Lumberjacks (USHL)	—
22	(United States)	Robby Newton	Junior	F	5' 9" (1.75 m)	190 lb (86 kg)	2001-07-16	Milwaukee, Wisconsin	Wisconsin (Big Ten)	—
23	(United States)	Owen Neuharth	Junior	F	5' 11" (1.8 m)	177 lb (80 kg)	2001-10-25	Savage, Minnesota	Fairbanks Ice Dogs (NAHL)	—
24	(United States)	Jake Schneider	Sophomore	F	5' 11" (1.8 m)	198 lb (90 kg)	2002-12-24	Plymouth, Minnesota	Prince George Spruce Kings (BCHL)	—
25	(United States)	Tommy Bergsland (A)	Senior	D	6' 3" (1.91 m)	185 lb (84 kg)	2001-03-23	Minnetrista, Minnesota	Bismarck Bobcats (NAHL)	—
27	(Canada)	Brett Merner	Freshman	D	6' 1" (1.85 m)	181 lb (82 kg)	2004-01-11	Nanaimo, British Columbia	Nanaimo Clippers (USHL)	—
28	(Canada)	Alex DiPaolo (A)	Senior	F	6' 1" (1.85 m)	188 lb (85 kg)	2000-04-28	Oakville, Ontario	Victoria Grizzlies (BCHL)	—
29	(United States)	Brett Chorske	Senior	F	6' 6" (1.98 m)	193 lb (88 kg)	2001-05-24	Edina, Minnesota	Colorado College (NCHC)	—
30	(United States)	Nick Haas	Junior	G	6' 4" (1.93 m)	195 lb (88 kg)	2001-11-11	Buffalo, New York	Chippewa Steel (NAHL)	—
35	(United States)	Jack Olson	Freshman	G	6' 1" (1.85 m)	174 lb (79 kg)	2003-03-28	St. Louis Park, Minnesota	Boston Jr. Bruins (NCDC)	—

=== Team photo ===
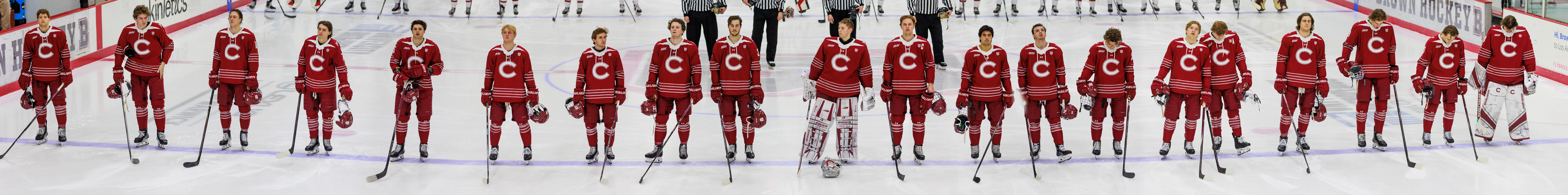
Lineup of the 2024-25 Raiders

== Standings ==
2024–25 ECAC Hockey Standings
	Conference record										Overall record					
	GP	W	L	T	OTW	OTL	SW	PTS	GF	GA	GP	W	L	T	GF	GA
#15 Quinnipiac †	22	16	5	1	2	3	0	50	79	42	38	24	12	2	135	83
#20 Clarkson	22	15	6	1	2	1	0	45	74	47	39	24	12	3	121	87
Colgate	22	13	7	2	2	2	1	42	80	65	36	18	15	3	114	116
Union	22	12	8	2	0	0	2	40	67	61	36	19	14	3	112	109
Dartmouth	22	12	9	1	0	2	0	39	70	52	33	18	13	2	110	84
#12 Cornell *	22	10	8	4	1	0	3	36	69	53	36	19	11	6	112	82
Harvard	22	9	10	3	2	2	1	31	56	56	33	13	17	3	85	97
Brown	22	9	11	2	3	0	2	28	53	63	32	14	15	3	79	85
Princeton	22	7	12	3	2	2	1	25	55	73	30	12	15	3	71	86
Rensselaer	22	7	15	0	0	2	0	23	57	82	35	12	21	2	101	131
Yale	22	5	14	3	1	1	1	19	52	80	30	6	21	3	67	121
St. Lawrence	22	5	15	2	1	1	1	18	43	81	35	9	24	2	71	121
Championship: March 22, 2025 † indicates conference regular season champion (Cleary Cup) * indicates conference tournament champion (Whitelaw Cup); Rankings: USCHO.com Top 20 Poll

== Schedule and results ==
Date	Time	Opponent^{#}	Rank^{#}	Site	TV	Decision	Result	Attendance	Record
Regular Season
October 5	7:30 pm	at Connecticut*		Toscano Family Ice Forum • Storrs, Connecticut	ESPN+	Takacs	L 2–4	2,300	0–1–0
October 6	7:30 pm	at Connecticut*		Toscano Family Ice Forum • Storrs, Connecticut	ESPN+	Haas	L 2–6	2,275	0–2–0
October 11	7:00 pm	Sacred Heart*		Class of 1965 Arena • Hamilton, New York	ESPN+	Takacs	W 6–5 ^{OT}	805	1–2–0
October 12	4:00 pm	Sacred Heart*		Class of 1965 Arena • Hamilton, New York	ESPN+	Haas	T 3–3 ^{OT}	745	1–2–1
October 18	7:00 pm	at Massachusetts Lowell*		Tsongas Center • Lowell, Massachusetts	ESPN+	Takacs	L 2–5	3,703	1–3–1
October 19	4:00 pm	at Massachusetts Lowell*		Tsongas Center • Lowell, Massachusetts	ESPN+	Haas	L 1–2	3,027	1–4–1
October 25	7:00 pm	at RIT*		Gene Polisseni Center • Henrietta, New York	FloHockey	Haas	W 5–4	3,170	2–4–1
October 26	5:00 pm	at RIT*		Gene Polisseni Center • Henrietta, New York	FloHockey	Takacs	W 4–3	2,857	3–4–1
November 8	7:00 pm	Brown		Class of 1965 Arena • Hamilton, New York	ESPN+	Takacs	W 5–3	1,234	4–4–1 (1–0–0)
November 9	7:00 pm	Yale		Class of 1965 Arena • Hamilton, New York	ESPN+	Haas	L 3–4	1,206	4–5–1 (1–1–0)
November 15	7:00 pm	at #20 Harvard		Bright-Landry Hockey Center • Boston, Massachusetts	ESPN+	Takacs	W 4–2	2,238	5–5–1 (2–1–0)
November 16	7:00 pm	at #17 Dartmouth		Thompson Arena • Hanover, New Hampshire	ESPN+	Takacs	T 4–4 ^{SOW}	2,381	5–5–2 (2–1–1)
November 22	7:00 pm	Princeton		Class of 1965 Arena • Hamilton, New York	ESPN+	Takacs	W 2–1	815	6–5–2 (3–1–1)
November 23	7:00 pm	#18 Quinnipiac		Class of 1965 Arena • Hamilton, New York	ESPN+	Takacs	W 3–2	886	7–5–2 (4–1–1)
November 26	7:00 pm	at Penn State*		Pegula Ice Arena • University Park, Pennsylvania		Takacs	L 2–3	5,165	7–6–2
November 27	7:00 pm	at Penn State*		Pegula Ice Arena • University Park, Pennsylvania		Takacs	L 1–7	5,376	7–7–2
December 6	7:00 pm	at #12 Cornell		Lynah Rink • Ithaca, New York	ESPN+, SNY	Takacs	L 2–3 ^{OT}	4,267	7–8–2 (4–2–1)
December 7	7:00 pm	#12 Cornell		Class of 1965 Arena • Hamilton, New York	ESPN+	Takacs	W 6–3	2,222	8–8–2 (5–2–1)
January 4	4:00 pm	Concordia*		Class of 1965 Arena • Hamilton, New York (Exhibition)	ESPN+	Haas	W 7–4	—	
January 10	7:00 pm	Long Island*		Class of 1965 Arena • Hamilton, New York	ESPN+	Takacs	W 2–1	903	9–8–2
January 11	4:00 pm	Long Island*		Class of 1965 Arena • Hamilton, New York	ESPN+	Takacs	W 3–1	612	10–8–2
January 17	7:00 pm	at #16 Quinnipiac		M&T Bank Arena • Hamden, Connecticut	ESPN+	Takacs	L 3–6	2,734	10–9–2 (5–3–1)
January 18	7:00 pm	at Princeton		Hobey Baker Memorial Rink • Princeton, New Jersey	ESPN+	Takacs	W 6–4	2,050	11–9–2 (6–3–1)
January 24	7:00 pm	Dartmouth		Class of 1965 Arena • Hamilton, New York	ESPN+	Takacs	W 3–2	1,237	12–9–2 (7–3–1)
January 25	7:00 pm	Harvard		Class of 1965 Arena • Hamilton, New York	ESPN+	Takacs	L 1–4	1,243	12–10–2 (7–4–1)
January 31	7:00 pm	at Clarkson		Cheel Arena • Potsdam, New York	ESPN+	Takacs	W 2–0	2,064	13–10–2 (8–4–1)
February 1	7:00 pm	at St. Lawrence		Appleton Arena • Canton, New York	ESPN+	Takacs	W 6–1	1,252	14–10–2 (9–4–1)
February 7	7:00 pm	Union		Class of 1965 Arena • Hamilton, New York	ESPN+	Takacs	T 2–2 ^{SOL}	921	14–10–3 (9–4–2)
February 8	7:00 pm	Rensselaer		Class of 1965 Arena • Hamilton, New York	ESPN+	Takacs	W 4–0	820	15–10–3 (10–4–2)
February 14	7:00 pm	at Yale		Ingalls Rink • New Haven, Connecticut	ESPN+	Takacs	L 4–5 ^{OT}	1,542	15–11–3 (10–5–2)
February 15	7:00 pm	at Brown		Meehan Auditorium • Providence, Rhode Island	ESPN+	Takacs	L 3–6 ^{OT}	877	15–12–3 (10–6–2)
February 21	7:00 pm	St. Lawrence		Class of 1965 Arena • Hamilton, New York	ESPN+	Takacs	W 5–4	974	16–12–3 (11–6–2)
February 22	7:00 pm	#19 Clarkson		Class of 1965 Arena • Hamilton, New York	ESPN+	Takacs	L 3–5	1,374	16–13–3 (11–7–2)
February 28	7:00 pm	at Rensselaer		Houston Field House • Troy, New York	ESPN+	Takacs	W 4–3	1,704	17–13–3 (12–7–2)
March 1	4:00 pm	at Union		Achilles Rink • Schenectady, New York	ESPN+	Takacs	W 5–1	2,296	18–13–3 (13–7–2)
ECAC Hockey Tournament
March 14	7:00 pm	Cornell*		Class of 1965 Arena • Hamilton, New York (ECAC Quarterfinal Game 1)	ESPN+	Takacs	L 1–4	1,100	18–14–3
March 15	7:00 pm	Cornell*		Class of 1965 Arena • Hamilton, New York (ECAC Quarterfinal Game 2)	ESPN+	Takacs	L 0–3	1,029	18–15–3
*Non-conference game. ^{#}Rankings from USCHO.com Poll. All times are in Eastern Time. Source:

== Scoring statistics ==
Name	Position	Games	Goals	Assists	Points	PIM
Brett Chorske	C/RW	36	15	19	34	23
Alex DiPaolo	LW	32	11	15	26	12
Max Nagel	F	36	6	18	24	12
Tommy Bergsland	D	36	4	20	24	10
Michael Neumeier	D	35	8	12	20	9
Ben Raymond	C/LW	36	9	9	18	21
Reid Irwin	D/C	32	6	11	17	8
Ryan Sullivan	F	23	5	10	15	20
Niko Rexine	C	33	5	10	15	12
Jake Schneider	RW	36	4	11	15	14
Antonio Fernandez	D	31	5	9	14	10
Daniel Panetta	C	25	10	3	13	12
Simon Labelle	LW	25	1	12	13	8
Robby Newton	F	25	3	6	9	8
Owen Neuharth	C	29	3	6	9	8
Nic Belpedio	D	31	3	6	9	6
Brett Merner	D	35	3	6	9	0
Simone Dadiè	F	31	5	2	7	8
Jack Brandt	F	31	2	5	7	40
Ryan Spinale	F	34	4	2	6	69
Jacob Napier	D	27	2	2	4	6
Bobby Metz	D	10	0	1	1	0
Dominic Foglia	D	16	0	1	1	4
Andrew Takacs	G	32	0	1	1	6
Nick Haas	G	7	0	0	0	0
Bench	–	–	–	–	–	10
Total			114	197	311	336

== Goaltending statistics ==
Name	Games	Minutes	Wins	Losses	Ties	Goals against	Saves	Shut outs	SV %	GAA
Andrew Takacs	32	1821:14	17	12	2	84	786	2	.903	2.77
Nick Haas	8	345:17	1	3	1	25	155	0	.861	4.34
Empty Net	-	25:15	-	-	-	7	-	-	-	-
Total	36	2191:46	18	15	3	116	941	2	.890	3.18

== Rankings ==
Poll	Week																											
Poll	Pre	1	2	3	4	5	6	7	8	9	10	11	12	13	14	15	16	17	18	19	20	21	22	23	24	25	26	27 (Final)
USCHO.com	NR	NR	NR	NR	NR	NR	NR	NR	NR	NR	NR	NR	-	NR	NR	NR	NR	NR	RV	RV	NR	NR	RV	RV	NR	NR	-	NR
USA Hockey	NR	NR	NR	NR	NR	NR	NR	NR	NR	NR	NR	NR	-	NR	NR	NR	NR	NR	RV	19	NR	NR	RV	RV	NR	NR	NR	NR

Note: USCHO did not release a poll in week 12 or 26.
Note: USA Hockey did not release a poll in week 12.

== Awards and honors ==
Player	Award	Ref
Michael Neumeier	ECAC Hockey Rookie of the Year	
Brett Chorske	All-ECAC Hockey First Team	
Tommy Bergsland	All-ECAC Hockey Second Team	
Michael Neumeier	ECAC Hockey All-Rookie Team	
