= 2025 ECAC Hockey men's tournament =

2025 ECAC Hockey men's ice hockey tournament
- Dates: March 7–22, 2025
- Teams: 12
- Finals site: Herb Brooks Arena; Lake Placid, New York
- Champions: Cornell (14th title)
- Winning coach: Mike Schafer (7th title)
- MVP: Ian Shane (Cornell)
- ECAC Hockey men's Ice Hockey Tournaments

The 2025 ECAC Hockey men's tournament was the 64th tournament in league history. It was played between March 7 and March 22, 2025. By winning the tournament, Cornell received ECAC Hockey's automatic bid to the 2025 NCAA Division I men's ice hockey tournament.

== Format ==
The tournament features four rounds of play. The teams that finish above fifth place in the standings received a bye to the quarterfinal round. In the first round, the fifth and twelfth seeds, the sixth and eleventh seeds, the seventh and tenth seeds and the eighth and ninth seeds played a single-elimination game with the winners advancing to the quarterfinals. In the quarterfinals the one seed played the lowest remaining seed, the second seed played the second-lowest remaining seed, the third seed played the third-lowest remaining seed and the fourth seed played the fourth-lowest remaining seed each in a best-of-three series with the winners of these the series advancing to the semifinals. In the semifinals the top remaining seed played the lowest remaining seed while the two remaining teams play against each other. The winners of the semifinals play in the championship game, and no third-place game is played. All series after the quarterfinals are single-elimination games. The tournament champion receives an automatic bid to the 2024 NCAA Division I men's ice hockey tournament.

== Conference standings ==
2024–25 ECAC Hockey Standings
	Conference record										Overall record					
	GP	W	L	T	OTW	OTL	SW	PTS	GF	GA	GP	W	L	T	GF	GA
#15 Quinnipiac †	22	16	5	1	2	3	0	50	79	42	38	24	12	2	135	83
#20 Clarkson	22	15	6	1	2	1	0	45	74	47	39	24	12	3	121	87
Colgate	22	13	7	2	2	2	1	42	80	65	36	18	15	3	114	116
Union	22	12	8	2	0	0	2	40	67	61	36	19	14	3	112	109
Dartmouth	22	12	9	1	0	2	0	39	70	52	33	18	13	2	110	84
#12 Cornell *	22	10	8	4	1	0	3	36	69	53	36	19	11	6	112	82
Harvard	22	9	10	3	2	2	1	31	56	56	33	13	17	3	85	97
Brown	22	9	11	2	3	0	2	28	53	63	32	14	15	3	79	85
Princeton	22	7	12	3	2	2	1	25	55	73	30	12	15	3	71	86
Rensselaer	22	7	15	0	0	2	0	23	57	82	35	12	21	2	101	131
Yale	22	5	14	3	1	1	1	19	52	80	30	6	21	3	67	121
St. Lawrence	22	5	15	2	1	1	1	18	43	81	35	9	24	2	71	121
Championship: March 22, 2025 † indicates conference regular season champion (Cleary Cup) * indicates conference tournament champion (Whitelaw Cup); Rankings: USCHO.com Top 20 Poll

== Bracket ==
Teams are reseeded for the quarterfinal and semifinal rounds

First Round; March 7–8
5	Dartmouth	6
12	St. Lawrence	2
6	Cornell	5
11	Yale	1
7	Harvard	5
10	Rensselaer	2
8	Brown	3
9	Princeton	2

Quarterfinals; March 14–16
1	Quinnipiac	4	4	-
8	Brown	1	0	-
2	Clarkson	3	2	2*
7	Harvard	2	3*	1
3	Colgate	1	0	-
6	Cornell	4	3	-
4	Union	2	2	-
5	Dartmouth	3	7	-

Semifinals; March 21
1	Quinnipiac	2
6	Cornell	3*
2	Clarkson	4
5	Dartmouth	1

Championship; March 22
6	Cornell	3
2	Clarkson	1

Note: * denotes overtime period(s)

== Results ==
Note: All game times are local.

=== First Round ===
==== (5) Dartmouth vs. (12) St. Lawrence ====
March 8, 2025; 7:00 pm	Dartmouth	6–2 (1–0, 2–2, 3–0)	St. Lawrence	Thompson Arena; Attendance: 2,248

Game reference

Emmett Croteau
Goalies
Mason Kucenski
Referees:
William Brennan III
Jason Williams
Linesmen:
Adam Wood
Brendon Wormley

(Nikora, Charpentier) Sean Chisholm (12) – 02:45	1–0
	1–1	24:01 – Greg Lapointe (11) (Cristall, Waite)
(Cleaves, Nikora) Sean Chisholm (13) – 28:48	2–1
(Charpentier, Flinton) Luke Haymes (10) – GW – 30:11	3–1
	3–2	38:58 – PP – Fēlikss Gavars (6) (Beneteau, Cristall)
(Townley, Stavroff) Braiden Dorfman (6) – 42:22	4–2
(M. Fusco, MacDonald) Eric Charpentier (3) – EN – 59:33	5–2
(Krause, Schenk) Nate Morgan (2) – EN – 59:54	6–2

6 min
Penalties
6 min
39
Shots
18

==== (6) Cornell vs. (11) Yale ====
March 8, 2025; 7:30 pm	Cornell	5–1 (1–0, 0–1, 4–0)	Yale	Lynah Rink; Attendance: 4,121

Game reference

Ian Shane
Goalies
Jack Stark
Referees:
Joe Carusone
Matt Terreri
Linesmen:
Dan Barreca
Ryan Knapp

(Robertson) Tim Rego (6) – 02:33	1–0
	1–1	36:27 – William Dineen (10) (Chen, Berger)
(Fegaras, Major) Ondřej Pšenička (8) – GW PP – 49:02	2–1
(unassisted) Hoyt Stanley (2) – 49:39	3–1
(Pšenička, Robertson) Tim Rego (7) – 56:51	4–1
(Suda) Nick DeSantis (7) – EN – 59:46	5–1

23 min
Penalties
14 min
33
Shots
19

==== (7) Harvard vs. (10) Rensselaer ====
March 7, 2025; 7:00 pm	Harvard	5–2 (1–1, 4–0, 0–1)	Rensselaer	Bright-Landry Hockey Center; Attendance: 1,420

Game reference

Aku Koskenvuo
Goalies
Noah Giesbrecht (out 35:18)
Jack Watson (in 35:18)
Referees:
Cameron Lynch
Anthony Kenney
Linesmen:
Stephen Drain
Ryan Chauvin

	0–1	11:26 – Dovar Tinling (10) (Caron, McDermott)
(Miller, Moore) Mick Thompson (11) – 17:37	1–1
(Healey, Miller) Justin Solovey (5) – 24:14	2–1
(MacDonald, Solovey) Joe Miller (5) – GW – 24:38	3–1
(Langenbrunner, St. Louis) Mick Thompson (12) – 27:50	4–1
(Moore, Thompson) Casey Severo (15) – PP – 35:18	5–1
	5–2	55:34 – Jakob Lee (13) (Goffredo)

4 min
Penalties
6 min
32
Shots
38

==== (8) Brown vs. (9) Princeton ====
March 7, 2025; 7:00 pm	Brown	3–2 (0–1, 1–0, 2–1)	Princeton	Meehan Auditorium; Attendance: 1,742

Game reference

Lawton Zacher
Goalies
Ethan Pearson
Referees:
C. J. Hanafin
Kenneth Gates
Linesmen:
Noah Merrow
Patrick Dapuzzo

	0–1	11:34 – Jayden Sison (2) (Devlin, Ezman)
(unassisted) Ryan St. Louis (10) – 20:41	1–1
(St. Louis) Tyler Kopff (8) – 46:15	2–1
(unassisted) Ryan St. Louis (11) – GW EN – 59:32	3–1
	3–2	59:56 – EA – Kevin Anderson (7) (Gunty, Buydens)

6 min
Penalties
6 min
25
Shots
22

=== Quarterfinals ===
==== (1) Quinnipiac vs. (8) Brown ====
March 14, 2025; 7:00 pm	Quinnipiac	4–1 (1–0, 1–0, 2–1)	Brown	M&T Bank Arena; Attendance: 2,512

Game reference

Matej Marinov
Goalies
Lawton Zacher
Referees:
Kenneth Gates
Douglas Place
Linesmen:
Stephen Drain
John Rey

(Moore) Victor Czerneckianair (12) – 05:23	1–0
(Treloar, Groenewold) Jeremy Wilmer (14) – GW – 24:16	2–0
(Marcellus, Moore) Andon Cerbone (14) – PP – 53:10	3–0
	3–1	54:28 – PP EA – Tyler Kopff (9) (St. Louis, Scott)
(Schwartz, Marcellus) Chris Pelosi (12) – EN – 57:49	4–1

8 min
Penalties
8 min
30
Shots
21

March 15, 2025; 4:00 pm	Quinnipiac	4–0 (0–0, 1–0, 3–0)	Brown	M&T Bank Arena; Attendance: 2,772

Game reference

Matej Marinov
Goalies
Lawton Zacher
Referees:
Kenneth Gates
Douglas Place
Linesmen:
Stephen Drain
John Rey

(Cipollone, Smith) Tyler Borgula (11) – GW – 24:30	1–0
(Ricketts, Groenewold) Mason Marcellus (10) – 42:01	2–0
(Marcellus, Cerbone) Tyler Borgula (12) – PP – 57:18	3–0
(Groenewold) Victor Czerneckianair (7) – PP EN – 59:03	4–0

4 min
Penalties
10 min
25
Shots
34

Quinnipiac wins series 2–0

==== (2) Clarkson vs. (7) Harvard ====
March 14, 2025; 7:00 pm	Clarkson	3–2 (0–1, 0–0, 3–1)	Harvard	Cheel Arena; Attendance: 2,466

Game reference

Ethan Langenegger
Goalies
Aku Koskenvuo
Referees:
Jason Williams
C. J. Hanafin
Linesmen:
Patrick Dapuzzo
Ryan Knapp

(Sukovic, Martino) Ryan Bottrill (6) – PP – 41:12	1–0
	1–1	27:44 – Mick Thompson (13) (Tresca, Severo)
	1–2	46:02 – PP – Ian Moore (6) (Healey, Miller)
(Martino, Richardson) Ellis Rickwood (10) – 46:44	2–2
(Martino, Ta. Taylor) Ryan Bottrill (7) – GW – 59:35	3–2

4 min
Penalties
4 min
28
Shots
17

March 15, 2025; 4:00 pm	Clarkson	2–3 (OT) (1–0, 1–2, 0–0, 0–1)	Harvard	Cheel Arena; Attendance: 2,492

Game reference

Ethan Langenegger
Goalies
Aku Koskenvuo
Referees:
Jason Williams
C. J. Hanafin
Linesmen:
Patrick Dapuzzo
Ryan Knapp

(Tr. Taylor, Sukovic) Erik Bargholtz (5) – 02:09	1–0
(Bottrill, Sparkes) Talon Sigurdson (10) – 20:56	2–0
	2–1	21:40 – Zakary Karpa (1) (unassisted)
	2–2	23:50 – Mason Langenbrunner (6) (Severo, St. Louis)
	2–3	66:09 – GW – Casey Severo (16) (Thompson)

4 min
Penalties
0 min
26
Shots
21

March 16, 2025; 4:00 pm	Clarkson	2–1 (OT) (0–1, 0–0, 1–0, 1–0)	Harvard	Cheel Arena; Attendance: 2,069

Game reference

Ethan Langenegger
Goalies
Aku Koskenvuo
Referees:
Jason Williams
C. J. Hanafin
Linesmen:
Patrick Dapuzzo
Ryan Knapp

	0–1	21:40 – SH – Mick Thompson (14) (unassisted)
(Tr. Taylor, Rickwood) Ayrton Martino (24) – PP – 02:09	1–1
(K. Taylor, Sigurdson) Luka Sukovic (7) – GW – 67:10	2–1

6 min
Penalties
6 min
41
Shots
26

Clarkson wins series 2–1

==== (3) Colgate vs. (6) Cornell ====
March 14, 2025; 7:00 pm	Colgate	1–4 (0–1, 1–1, 0–2)	Cornell	Class of 1965 Arena; Attendance: 1,100

Game reference

Andrew Takacs
Goalies
Ian Shane
Referees:
Anthony Kenney
Cameron Lynch
Linesmen:
Adam Wood
Brendon Wormley

	0–1	14:25 – Kyle Penney (6) (Major, Suda)
	0–2	31:07 – GW – Jack O'Leary (7) (Kovich, Stanley)
(Chorske, Irwin) Alex DiPaolo (11) – 38:16	1–2
	1–3	48:08 – Jonathan Castagna (4) (Penney, Major)
	1–4	58:49 – PP EN – Sullivan Mack (7) (Kovich)

8 min
Penalties
4 min
22
Shots
28

March 15, 2025; 7:00 pm	Colgate	0–3 (0–1, 0–0, 0–2)	Cornell	Class of 1965 Arena; Attendance: 1,029

Game reference

Andrew Takacs
Goalies
Ian Shane
Referees:
Anthony Kenney
Cameron Lynch
Linesmen:
Adam Wood
Brendon Wormley

0–1	06:37 – GW – Sullivan Mack (8) (Bancroft, Suda)
0–2	44:11 – PP – Charlie Major (7) (Pšenička, Suda)
0–3	59:32 – SH – Dalton Bancroft (15) (unassisted)

8 min
Penalties
14 min
21
Shots
22

Cornell wins series 2–0

==== (4) Union vs. (5) Dartmouth ====
March 14, 2025; 7:00 pm	Union	2–3 (1–1, 1–1, 0–1)	Dartmouth	Achilles Rink; Attendance: 2,302

Game reference

Kyle Chauvette
Goalies
Emmett Croteau
Referees:
William Brennan III
Joseph Carusone
Linesmen:
Cameron Goebert
Jason Shattie

(Brueck, Miles) Lucas Buzziol (4) – 05:54	1–0
	1–1	09:48 – Nikita Nikora (4) (Chisholm, Cleaves)
(Villegas, Miles) Josh Nixon (13) – 21:33	2–1
	2–2	37:10 – Braiden Dorfman (7) (Stavroff, M. Fusco)
	2–3	47:33 – GW – Sean Chisholm (14) (Charpentier, Nikora)

4 min
Penalties
0 min
25
Shots
19

March 15, 2025; 7:00 pm	Union	2–7 (1–1, 0–2, 1–4)	Dartmouth	Achilles Rink; Attendance: 2,298

Game reference

Kyle Chauvette
Goalies
Emmett Croteau
Referees:
William Brennan III
Joseph Carusone
Linesmen:
Cameron Goebert
Jason Shattie

(Ferguson) Lucas Buzziol (5) – 11:14	1–0
	1–1	13:58 – Luke Haymes (11) (Charpentier)
	1–2	24:29 – John Fusco (10) (M. Fusco, Cleaves)
	1–3	27:06 – GW PP – Luke Haymes (12) (Stavroff, Nikora)
	1–4	43:08 – Nate Morgan (3) (J. Fusco)
(Prokop) Josh Nixon (14) – 44:56	2–4
	2–5	46:29 – Sean Chisholm (15) (Foley, Nikora)
	2–6	50:33 – SH EN – Cooper Flinton (11) (Krause)
	2–7	59:24 – PP – Nate Morgan (4) (Krause, Grable)

23 min
Penalties
10 min
20
Shots
37

Dartmouth wins series 2–0

=== Semifinals ===
==== (1) Quinnipiac vs. (6) Cornell ====
March 21, 2025; 4:00 pm	Quinnipiac	2–3 (OT) (0–1, 1–0, 1–1, 0–1)	Cornell	Herb Brooks Arena; Attendance: 5,320

Game reference

Matej Marinov
Goalies
Ian Shane
Referees:
Kenneth Gates
Cameron Lynch
Linesmen:
Jason Shattie
Ryan Knapp

(Treloar) Andon Cerbone (15) – PP – 34:08	1–0
	1–1	19:56 – PP – Jonathan Castagna (5) (Rego, Walsh)
(Leddy, Power) Chris Pelosi (13) – 54:42	2–1
	2–2	58:21 – SH – Kyler Kovich (5) (Kraft)
	2–3	74:39 – GW PP – Tim Rego (8) (Bancroft, Walsh)

8 min
Penalties
10 min
24
Shots
22

==== (2) Clarkson vs. (5) Dartmouth ====
March 21, 2025; 7:00 pm	Clarkson	4–1 (0–0, 2–0, 2–1)	Dartmouth	Herb Brooks Arena; Attendance: 5,320

Game reference

Ethan Langenegger
Goalies
Roan Clarke
Referees:
Jason Williams
Anthony Kenney
Linesmen:
John Rey
Patrick Dapuzzo

(Tr. Taylor, Sarsland) Ryan Bottrill (8) – 21:04	1–0
(Rickwood, Martino) Tristan Sarsland (8) – GW – 25:23	2–0
(Rickwood, Richardson) Trey Taylor (9) – PP – 44:54	3–0
	3–1	55:32 – EA – John Fusco (11) (Cleaves, Chisholm)
(Richardson) Ayrton Martino (25) – EN – 58:10	4–1

4 min
Penalties
8 min
15
Shots
26

=== Championship ===
==== (2) Clarkson vs. (6) Cornell ====
March 22, 2025; 5:00 pm	Clarkson	1–3 (0–2, 1–0, 0–1)	Cornell	Herb Brooks Arena; Attendance: 6,019

Game reference

Ethan Langenegger
Goalies
Ian Shane
Referees:
Joe Carusone
C. J. Hanafin
Linesmen:
Adam Wood
Stephen Drain

	0–1	05:11 – Ondřej Pšenička (9) (Castagna, DeSantis)
	0–2	07:03 – GW – Nick DeSantis (8) (Castagna, Pšenička)
(Sukovic, Dahm) Erik Bargholtz (6) – 33:23	1–2
	1–3	58:11 – EN – Ryan Walsh (14) (Pšenička)

4 min
Penalties
6 min
31
Shots
24

== Tournament awards ==
=== All-Tournament Team ===
- G Ian Shane* (Cornell)
- D Tim Rego (Cornell)
- D Trey Taylor (Clarkson)
- F Jonathan Castagna (Cornell)
- F Nick DeSantis (Cornell)
- F Ayrton Martino (Clarkson)

* Most Outstanding Player(s)
