= 2024–25 Yale Bulldogs men's ice hockey season =

- Conference: 11th ECAC Hockey
- Home ice: Ingalls Rink

Rankings
- USCHO: NR
- USA Hockey: NR

Record
- Overall: 6–21–3
- Conference: 5–14–3
- Home: 3–11–0
- Road: 3–8–3
- Neutral: 0–2–0

Coaches and captains
- Head coach: Keith Allain
- Assistant coaches: Joe Howe; Rob O'Gara; Arlen Marshall; Bill Maniscalco
- Captain: William Dineen

The 2024–25 Yale Bulldogs Men's ice hockey season was the 129th season of play for the program and the 63rd in ECAC Hockey. The Bulldogs represented Yale University in the 2024–25 NCAA Division I men's ice hockey season, played their home games at the Ingalls Rink and were coached by Keith Allain in his 18th season.

== Season ==
From the very start of the season Yale was faced with a sizable hurdle with their goaltending. None of the team's three netminders were able to provide a suitable performance in goal. While they could, on occasion, limit the opposition to under 3 goals, the Bulldogs allowed an average of just more than 4 goals per game, the third worst in the nation. With the team already hamstrung by their porous netminding, Yale's problems were compounded by also possessing a weak offense that only averaged about two and a quarter goals per match. The stark difference in those numbers left the team with few opportunities to win throughout the season. Yale was able to rise to the occasion for brief moments, even managing to defeat a ranked Boston University squad in late December. However, the story of the season was largely one of futility and the Bulldogs wallowed near the bottom of both the standings and ranking for virtually the entire season.

There were some silver linings for Yale; the offense got considerable contributions from freshmen with Ronan O'Donnell not only leading the team with 20 points but three others finished in the top six for the Bulldogs. Also, for all the trouble with keeping the puck out of their net, the defense wasn't particularly bad and did limit opposing teams to around 30 shots per game. Unfortunately, those minor positives weren't able to change Yale's situation come playoff time and the Bulldogs were bounced out after one game.

== Departures ==
Player	Position	Nationality	Cause
Niklas Allain	Forward	United States	Graduation (signed with Brödernas/Väsby IK HK)
Ian Carpentier	Forward	United States	Graduate transfer to Massachusetts Lowell
Reilly Connors	Forward	United States	Graduate transfer to St. Lawrence
Ryan Conroy	Defenseman	Canada	Graduation (signed with Adirondack Thunder)
Nathan Reid	Goaltender	United States	Graduation (retired)
Ryan Stevens	Forward	United States	Graduation (retired)
Henry Wagner	Forward	United States	Graduation (signed with Eisbären Heilbronn)
Teddy Wooding	Forward	United States	Graduation (retired)

== Recruiting ==
Player	Position	Nationality	Age	Notes
Micah Berger	Forward	United States	20	Bethesda, MD
Joe Blackley	Defenseman	United States	21	Lockport, NY
Donovan Frias	Forward	United States	19	Hudson, MA
Julian Frias	Forward	United States	19	Hudson, MA
Hughie Hooker	Defenseman	Canada	20	Brandon, MB
Ronan O'Donnell	Forward	United States	20	Fairfield, CT
Noah Pak	Goaltender	Canada	21	Oakville, ON
Zachary Wagnon	Forward	United States	20	Red Bank, NJ

== Roster ==
As of September 24, 2024.

No.	Nat.	Player	Class	Pos	Height	Weight	DoB	Hometown	Previous team	NHL rights
1	(United States)	Jack Stark	Sophomore	G	5' 9" (1.75 m)	146 lb (66 kg)	2003-06-19	Chaska, Minnesota	Chicago Steel (USHL)	—
2	(United States)	Bayard Hall	Junior	D	6' 1" (1.85 m)	176 lb (80 kg)	2002-08-16	Oldwick, New Jersey	Youngstown Phantoms (USHL)	—
4	(United States)	Jason Marsella	Junior	D	5' 11" (1.8 m)	193 lb (88 kg)	2002-11-20	Greenwich, Connecticut	Powell River Kings (BCHL)	—
5	(United States)	Dylan Herzog	Senior	D	6' 1" (1.85 m)	200 lb (91 kg)	2001-01-09	Auburn, Washington	Dubuque Fighting Saints (USHL)	—
6	(United States)	Connor Sullivan	Senior	D	5' 11" (1.8 m)	180 lb (82 kg)	2000-09-07	Plymouth, Massachusetts	Islanders Hockey Club (NCDC)	—
7	(United States)	Tucker Hartmann	Junior	D	5' 11" (1.8 m)	174 lb (79 kg)	2002-04-04	Southborough, Massachusetts	Salmon Arm Silverbacks (BCHL)	—
8	(United States)	Ronan O'Donnell	Freshman	F	6' 2" (1.88 m)	174 lb (79 kg)	2004-02-26	Fairfield, Connecticut	Madison Capitols (USHL)	—
9	(United States)	Micah Berger	Freshman	F	5' 11" (1.8 m)	174 lb (79 kg)	2004-06-29	Bethesda, Maryland	Surrey Eagles (BCHL)	—
10	(United States)	Zach Wagnon	Freshman	F	6' 0" (1.83 m)	174 lb (79 kg)	2004-03-26	Red Bank, New Jersey	Surrey Eagles (BCHL)	—
11	(Canada)	Hughie Hooker	Freshman	D	5' 7" (1.7 m)	159 lb (72 kg)	2003-10-11	Brandon, Manitoba	Brooks Bandits (BCHL)	—
12	(United States)	Will Richter	Sophomore	F	6' 1" (1.85 m)	172 lb (78 kg)	2004-08-20	Greenwich, Connecticut	Penticton Vees (BCHL)	—
13	(Finland)	Iisai Pesonen	Sophomore	F	5' 10" (1.78 m)	150 lb (68 kg)	2004-02-20	Kuopio, Finland	KalPa U20 (U20 SM-sarja)	—
15	(Canada)	Kalen Szeto	Junior	F	5' 7" (1.7 m)	155 lb (70 kg)	2002-10-12	Vancouver, British Columbia	Victoria Grizzlies (BCHL)	—
16	(United States)	David Andreychuk	Sophomore	F	6' 1" (1.85 m)	190 lb (86 kg)	2002-04-02	Los Angeles, California	Northeast Generals (NAHL)	—
17	(United States)	William Dineen (C)	Senior	F	6' 2" (1.88 m)	195 lb (88 kg)	2000-11-17	Lake George, New York	Sioux Falls Stampede (USHL)	—
18	(Canada)	Seiya Tanaka-Campbell	Sophomore	F	5' 9" (1.75 m)	170 lb (77 kg)	2003-02-12	Mill Bay, British Columbia	Vernon Vipers (BCHL)	—
19	(Canada)	JoJo Tanaka-Campbell	Junior	F	5' 11" (1.8 m)	185 lb (84 kg)	2001-01-11	Mill Bay, British Columbia	Vernon Vipers (BCHL)	—
20	(Canada)	Owen Forester	Sophomore	D	5' 10" (1.78 m)	185 lb (84 kg)	2003-06-17	Mississauga, Ontario	Milton Menace (OJHL)	—
21	(United States)	Briggs Gammill	Senior	F	5' 10" (1.78 m)	175 lb (79 kg)	2001-05-09	New Canaan, Connecticut	Connecticut Jr. Rangers (NCDC)	—
22	(Canada)	Rhys Bentham	Sophomore	D	5' 10" (1.78 m)	172 lb (78 kg)	2002-05-15	Calgary, Alberta	Cranbrook Bucks (BCHL)	—
23	(United States)	Joe Blackley	Freshman	D	5' 11" (1.8 m)	185 lb (84 kg)	2003-09-08	Lockport, New York	Cranbrook Bucks (BCHL)	—
24	(United States)	David Chen	Junior	F	6' 0" (1.83 m)	172 lb (78 kg)	2003-04-01	Livingston, New Jersey	Cedar Rapids RoughRiders (USHL)	—
25	(Canada)	Kieran O'Hearn	Senior	D	6' 3" (1.91 m)	200 lb (91 kg)	2000-05-13	North Delta, British Columbia	Surrey Eagles (BCHL)	—
26	(Canada)	Elan Bar-Lev-Wise	Junior	F	6' 0" (1.83 m)	190 lb (86 kg)	2001-02-01	Vancouver, British Columbia	West Kelowna Warriors (BCHL)	—
27	(United States)	Donovan Frias	Freshman	F	6' 4" (1.93 m)	201 lb (91 kg)	2004-11-09	Hudson, Massachusetts	Cranbrook Bucks (BCHL)	—
28	(United States)	Julian Frias	Freshman	F	6' 4" (1.93 m)	201 lb (91 kg)	2004-11-09	Hudson, Massachusetts	Cranbrook Bucks (BCHL)	—
30	(Canada)	Luke Pearson	Senior	G	6' 2" (1.88 m)	185 lb (84 kg)	2001-01-29	Whitby, Ontario	Alberni Valley Bulldogs (BCHL)	—
31	(Canada)	Noah Pak	Freshman	G	6' 0" (1.83 m)	161 lb (73 kg)	2003-06-01	Oakville, Ontario	Collingwood Blues (OJHL)	—

== Standings ==
2024–25 ECAC Hockey Standings
	Conference record										Overall record					
	GP	W	L	T	OTW	OTL	SW	PTS	GF	GA	GP	W	L	T	GF	GA
#15 Quinnipiac †	22	16	5	1	2	3	0	50	79	42	38	24	12	2	135	83
#20 Clarkson	22	15	6	1	2	1	0	45	74	47	39	24	12	3	121	87
Colgate	22	13	7	2	2	2	1	42	80	65	36	18	15	3	114	116
Union	22	12	8	2	0	0	2	40	67	61	36	19	14	3	112	109
Dartmouth	22	12	9	1	0	2	0	39	70	52	33	18	13	2	110	84
#12 Cornell *	22	10	8	4	1	0	3	36	69	53	36	19	11	6	112	82
Harvard	22	9	10	3	2	2	1	31	56	56	33	13	17	3	85	97
Brown	22	9	11	2	3	0	2	28	53	63	32	14	15	3	79	85
Princeton	22	7	12	3	2	2	1	25	55	73	30	12	15	3	71	86
Rensselaer	22	7	15	0	0	2	0	23	57	82	35	12	21	2	101	131
Yale	22	5	14	3	1	1	1	19	52	80	30	6	21	3	67	121
St. Lawrence	22	5	15	2	1	1	1	18	43	81	35	9	24	2	71	121
Championship: March 22, 2025 † indicates conference regular season champion (Cleary Cup) * indicates conference tournament champion (Whitelaw Cup); Rankings: USCHO.com Top 20 Poll

== Schedule and results ==
Date	Time	Opponent^{#}	Rank^{#}	Site	TV	Decision	Result	Attendance	Record
Regular Season
November 1	7:00 pm	#1 Denver*		Ingalls Rink • New Haven, Connecticut	ESPN+	Stark	L 0–6	1,498	0–1–0
November 2	7:00 pm	#1 Denver*		Ingalls Rink • New Haven, Connecticut	ESPN+	Stark	L 1–5	2,162	0–2–0
November 8	7:00 pm	at #6 Cornell		Lynah Rink • Ithaca, New York	ESPN+	Stark	T 2–2 ^{SOW}	4,267	0–2–1 (0–0–1)
November 9	7:00 pm	at Colgate		Class of 1965 Arena • Hamilton, New York	ESPN+	Stark	W 4–3	1,206	1–2–1 (1–0–1)
November 15	7:00 pm	Princeton		Ingalls Rink • New Haven, Connecticut	ESPN+	Stark	L 1–4	1,742	1–3–1 (1–1–1)
November 16	7:00 pm	#19 Quinnipiac		Ingalls Rink • New Haven, Connecticut	ESPN+	Stark	L 1–4	3,126	1–4–1 (1–2–1)
November 22	7:00 pm	at St. Lawrence		Appleton Arena • Canton, New York	ESPN+	Stark	W 5–1	851	2–4–1 (2–2–1)
November 23	7:00 pm	at #19 Clarkson		Cheel Arena • Potsdam, New York	ESPN+	Pak	L 0–4	2,720	2–5–1 (2–3–1)
November 29	7:30 pm	at Long Island*		Northwell Health Ice Center • East Meadow, New York	ESPN+	Stark	L 2–3	287	2–6–1
November 30	7:30 pm	at Long Island*		Northwell Health Ice Center • East Meadow, New York	ESPN+	Pearson	L 0–3	408	2–7–1
December 29	4:00 pm	#13 Boston University*		Ingalls Rink • New Haven, Connecticut	ESPN+	Pak	W 7–5	2,960	3–7–1
January 3	7:00 pm	Rensselaer		Ingalls Rink • New Haven, Connecticut	ESPN+	Pak	L 3–5	1,408	3–8–1 (2–4–1)
January 4	7:00 pm	Union		Ingalls Rink • New Haven, Connecticut	ESPN+	Pearson	L 3–4	1,394	3–9–1 (2–5–1)
January 10	7:00 pm	at Dartmouth		Thompson Arena • Hanover, New Hampshire	ESPN+	Stark	W 3–2	2,126	4–9–1 (3–5–1)
January 11	7:00 pm	at Harvard		Bright-Landry Hockey Center • Boston, Massachusetts (Rivalry)	ESPN+	Stark	L 1–3	—	4–10–1 (3–6–1)
January 17	7:00 pm	#20 Clarkson		Ingalls Rink • New Haven, Connecticut	ESPN+	Stark	L 4–7	1,607	4–11–1 (3–7–1)
January 18	7:00 pm	St. Lawrence		Ingalls Rink • New Haven, Connecticut	ESPN+	Pak	W 3–2	1,835	5–11–1 (4–7–1)
Connecticut Ice
January 24	7:30 pm	at Sacred Heart*		Martire Family Arena • Fairfield, Connecticut (Connecticut Ice Semifinal)	SNY	Pak	L 2–8	4,002	5–12–1
January 25	4:00 pm	vs. #15 Quinnipiac*		Martire Family Arena • Fairfield, Connecticut (Connecticut Ice Consolation Game)	SNY	Stark	L 2–6	2,088	5–13–1
January 31	7:00 pm	at Union		Achilles Rink • Schenectady, New York	ESPN+	Stark	T 3–3 ^{SOL}	1,419	5–13–2 (4–7–2)
February 1	7:00 pm	at Rensselaer		Houston Field House • Troy, New York	ESPN+	Stark	L 2–5	4,546	5–14–2 (4–8–2)
February 6	7:00 pm	Brown		Ingalls Rink • New Haven, Connecticut	ESPN+	Stark	L 1–2	1,599	5–15–2 (4–9–2)
February 9	2:00 pm	at Brown		Meehan Auditorium • Providence, Rhode Island	ESPN+	Stark	L 1–5	982	5–16–2 (4–10–2)
February 14	7:00 pm	Colgate		Ingalls Rink • New Haven, Connecticut	ESPN+	Pak	W 5–4 ^{OT}	1,542	6–16–2 (5–10–2)
February 15	7:00 pm	Cornell		Ingalls Rink • New Haven, Connecticut	ESPN+	Pak	L 3–5	2,697	6–17–2 (5–11–2)
February 21	7:00 pm	at #14 Quinnipiac		M&T Bank Arena • Hamden, Connecticut	ESPN+	Stark	L 1–4	3,625	6–18–2 (5–12–2)
February 22	7:00 pm	at Princeton		Hobey Baker Memorial Rink • Princeton, New Jersey	ESPN+	Pearson	T 2–2 ^{SOL}	2,111	6–18–3 (5–12–3)
February 28	7:00 pm	Harvard		Ingalls Rink • New Haven, Connecticut (Rivalry)	ESPN+	Stark	L 3–4 ^{OT}	3,340	6–19–3 (5–13–3)
March 1	7:00 pm	Dartmouth		Ingalls Rink • New Haven, Connecticut	ESPN+	Pearson	L 1–5	2,155	6–20–3 (5–14–3)
ECAC Hockey Tournament
March 8	7:30 pm	at Cornell*		Lynah Rink • Ithaca, New York (ECAC First Round)	ESPN+	Stark	L 1–5	4,121	6–21–3
*Non-conference game. ^{#}Rankings from USCHO.com Poll. All times are in Eastern Time. Source:

== Scoring statistics ==
Name	Position	Games	Goals	Assists	Points	PIM
Ronan O'Donnell	RW	29	11	9	20	31
Will Dineen	F	30	6	12	18	24
David Chen	F	18	10	7	17	23
Micah Berger	LW	21	5	10	15	6
Zachary Wagnon	F	30	3	11	14	20
Donovan Frias	LW	30	7	5	12	20
Will Richter	F	30	5	6	11	14
Connor Sullivan	D	30	2	9	11	24
Dylan Herzog	D	30	2	9	11	33
Briggs Gammill	F	30	3	4	7	18
Kieran O'Hearn	D	29	1	6	7	18
Julian Frias	F	30	2	4	6	12
Hughie Hooker	D	26	1	5	6	10
Kalen Szeto	F	27	4	1	5	4
Rhys Bentham	D	8	1	3	4	2
David Andreychuk	C/LW	27	1	3	4	22
Bayard Hall	D	27	0	4	4	12
Iisai Pesonen	C	25	1	2	3	10
Elan Bar-Lev-Wise	C	25	1	1	2	8
Tucker Hartmann	D	16	1	0	1	2
Joe Blackley	D	9	0	1	1	0
Owen Forester	D	2	0	0	0	0
Jason Marsella	D	2	0	0	0	0
Luke Pearson	G	6	0	0	0	0
Noah Pak	G	8	0	0	0	0
JoJo Tanaka-Campbell	F	10	0	0	0	2
Jack Stark	G	20	0	0	0	0
Seiya Tanaka-Campbell	F	20	0	0	0	4
Bench	–	–	–	–	–	6
Total			67	112	179	337

== Goaltending statistics ==
Name	Games	Minutes	Wins	Losses	Ties	Goals against	Saves	Shut outs	SV %	GAA
Luke Pearson	6	295:47	0	3	1	18	126	0	.875	3.65
Jack Stark	20	1153:23	3	14	2	72	523	0	.879	3.75
Noah Pak	8	357:47	3	4	0	23	156	0	.872	3.86
Empty Net	-	11:36	-	-	-	8	-	-	-	-
Total	30	1818:33	6	21	3	121	805	0	.869	3.99

== Rankings ==
Poll	Week																											
Poll	Pre	1	2	3	4	5	6	7	8	9	10	11	12	13	14	15	16	17	18	19	20	21	22	23	24	25	26	27 (Final)
USCHO.com	NR	NR	NR	NR	NR	NR	NR	NR	NR	NR	NR	NR	–	NR	NR	NR	NR	NR	NR	NR	NR	NR	NR	NR	NR	NR	–	NR
USA Hockey	NR	NR	NR	NR	NR	NR	NR	NR	NR	NR	NR	NR	–	NR	NR	NR	NR	NR	NR	NR	NR	NR	NR	NR	NR	NR	NR	NR

Note: USCHO did not release a poll in week 12 or 26.
Note: USA Hockey did not release a poll in week 12.
