= Dave Karpa =

Canadian ice hockey player (born 1971)

- Born: May 7, 1971 (age 54) Regina, Saskatchewan, Canada
- Height: 6 ft 1 in (185 cm)
- Weight: 210 lb (95 kg; 15 st 0 lb)
- Position: Defence
- Shot: Right
- Played for: Quebec Nordiques; Mighty Ducks of Anaheim; Carolina Hurricanes; New York Rangers
- NHL draft: 68th overall, 1991; Quebec Nordiques
- Playing career: 1992–2006

David James Karpa (born May 7, 1971) is a Canadian former professional ice hockey player who played in the National Hockey League for the Quebec Nordiques, Mighty Ducks of Anaheim, Carolina Hurricanes and New York Rangers between 1993 and 2003. He was selected 68th overall by the Nordiques in the 1991 NHL entry draft from Ferris State University.

== Coaching career ==
On May 19, 2015, Karpa was named the assistant head coach for the Flint Firebirds of the Ontario Hockey League (OHL). In a highly publicized incident, he was fired a month into the season, along with head coach John Gruden. Following a successful player walkout, Karpa was reinstated as the Firebirds assistant head coach. On February 17, 2016, Karpa was again fired by the Firebirds.

On August 8, 2016, Karpa was named the head coach and general manager of the Peoria Mustangs in the Tier III junior level North American 3 Hockey League. His tenure in Peoria ended after just one season.

== Personal life ==
Karpa's son Zakary Karpa is an ice hockey center for the Hartford Wolf Pack. He played collegiate hockey for the Harvard Crimson. He was drafted by the Rangers in the 6th round of the 2022 NHL entry draft with the 191st overall pick in the draft.

== Career statistics ==
=== Regular season and playoffs ===
			Regular season					Playoffs
Season	Team	League	GP	G	A	Pts	PIM	GP	G	A	Pts	PIM
1988–89	Notre Dame Hounds	SJHL	57	15	27	42	287	—	—	—	—	—
1989–90	Notre Dame Hounds	SJHL	43	9	19	28	271	—	—	—	—	—
1990–91	Ferris State University	CCHA	41	6	19	25	109	—	—	—	—	—
1991–92	Ferris State University	CCHA	34	7	12	19	124	—	—	—	—	—
1991–92	Quebec Nordiques	NHL	4	0	0	0	14	—	—	—	—	—
1991–92	Halifax Citadels	AHL	2	0	0	0	4	—	—	—	—	—
1992–93	Quebec Nordiques	NHL	12	0	1	1	13	3	0	0	0	0
1992–93	Halifax Citadels	AHL	71	4	27	31	167	—	—	—	—	—
1993–94	Quebec Nordiques	NHL	60	5	12	17	148	—	—	—	—	—
1993–94	Cornwall Aces	AHL	1	0	0	0	0	12	2	2	4	27
1994–95	Quebec Nordiques	NHL	2	0	0	0	0	—	—	—	—	—
1994–95	Cornwall Aces	AHL	6	0	2	2	19	—	—	—	—	—
1994–95	Mighty Ducks of Anaheim	NHL	26	1	5	6	91	—	—	—	—	—
1995–96	Mighty Ducks of Anaheim	NHL	72	3	16	19	270	—	—	—	—	—
1996–97	Mighty Ducks of Anaheim	NHL	69	2	11	13	210	8	1	1	2	20
1997–98	Mighty Ducks of Anaheim	NHL	78	1	11	12	217	—	—	—	—	—
1998–99	Carolina Hurricanes	NHL	33	0	2	2	55	2	0	0	0	2
1999–00	Carolina Hurricanes	NHL	27	1	4	5	52	—	—	—	—	—
1999–00	Cincinnati Cyclones	IHL	39	1	8	9	147	—	—	—	—	—
2000–01	Carolina Hurricanes	NHL	80	4	6	10	159	6	0	0	0	17
2001–02	New York Rangers	NHL	75	1	10	11	131	—	—	—	—	—
2002–03	New York Rangers	NHL	19	0	2	2	14	—	—	—	—	—
2002–03	Hartford Wolf Pack	AHL	34	0	7	7	70	2	0	0	0	0
2003–04	Wilkes–Barre/Scranton Penguins	AHL	29	3	8	11	43	—	—	—	—	—
2003–04	Amur Khabarovsk	RSL	12	0	1	1	68	—	—	—	—	—
2004–05	Syracuse Crunch	AHL	5	0	0	0	6	—	—	—	—	—
2004–05	San Diego Gulls	ECHL	20	2	10	12	65	—	—	—	—	—
2005–06	Bridgeport Sound Tigers	AHL	22	0	4	4	44	—	—	—	—	—
NHL totals			557	18	80	98	1374	19	1	1	2	39
