= 2024–25 Clarkson Golden Knights men's ice hockey season =

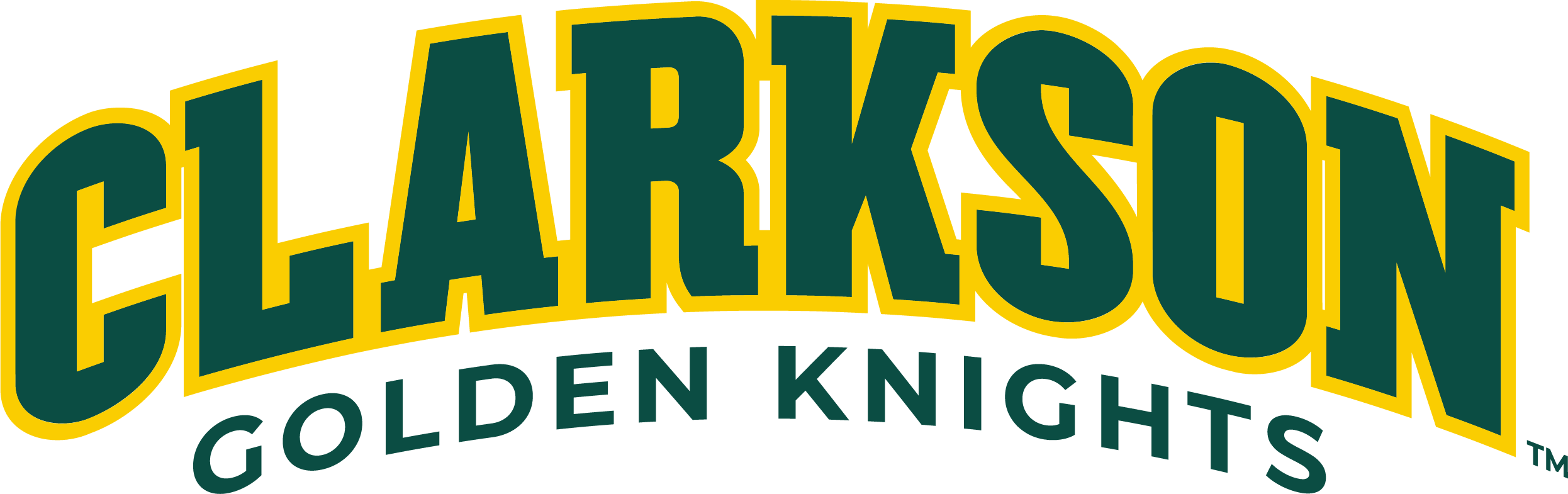
- Conference: 2nd ECAC Hockey
- Home ice: Cheel Arena

Rankings
- USCHO: #20
- USA Hockey: #19

Record
- Overall: 24–12–3
- Conference: 15–6–1
- Home: 11–9–2
- Road: 12–1–0
- Neutral: 1–2–1

Coaches and captains
- Head coach: Jean-François Houle
- Assistant coaches: Chris Brooks; Cory Schneider; Sebastian Ragno
- Captain(s): Ryan Richardson; Kaelan Taylor

The 2024–25 Clarkson Golden Knights Men's ice hockey season was the 103rd season of play for the program and 64th in ECAC Hockey. The Golden Knights represented Clarkson University in the 2024–25 NCAA Division I men's ice hockey season, played their home games at Cheel Arena and were coached by Jean-François Houle in his 1st season.

== Season ==
With Jean-François Houle's return to the program in the wake of Casey Jones' departure, a good deal of changes were afoot for the Golden Knights. Aside from the normal roster turnover, the team was now operating under a different system of play that seemed to cause some ups and downs early in the season. Graduate transfer Ethan Langenegger stepped into the void in goal and remained the primary starter for the entirety of the season. A stronger performance in goal was needed as Houle's style was not quite as oppressive on the back end, with the team allowing about 2.5 more shots against per game, however, they were still among the best teams in the nation in limiting scoring chances for their opponents.

The first five weeks of the season saw the team post a decent record in non-conference play, albeit against weak opposition, and they continued to post good results as the club started their ECAC schedule. The team took a small break after Thanksgiving to participate in the Adirondack Winter Invitational. Both of their opponents were ranked clubs from Hockey East and, though the Knights performed well in the matches, they lost both to finish third. After the disappointing result, Ayrton Martino finally grew accustomed to the new system and began scoring on a pace that hadn't been seen since Nico Sturm was on the team. Martino recorded points in eight consecutive games from late November until mid-January and helped the team post a solid 5–2–1 record during that stretch. When he failed to score in two games at the end of the month, the team's offense looked unable to cope and lost both games in spite of a strong defensive effort.

After slipping in the rankings, Martino began a second scoring streak, this time recording points in 10 consecutive games and leading the Knights on a 7-game winning streak. Even more important, Clarkson was able to bookend the stretch with two victories over league-leading Quinnipiac and lift themselves into the top-20 of the PairWise. Unfortunately, The overall weakness of ECAC Hockey prevented the team from having any real chance for an at-large bid despite ending the year 11 games over .500.

Clarkson's second-place finish gave the team a bye into the quarterfinal round and gave them an relatively easy match against Harvard. The Knights were able to limit the Crimson to just 17 shots in the first game but the visitors made the most of their opportunities by twice getting a lead. Clarkson's offense was entirely dependent on Martino once more with the senior assisting on all three of the teams goals in the third period. After the narrow win, Clarkson was able to shake off the rust and just out to a two-goal lead before their attack stalled and Harvard was able to score the next three goals, the last coming in overtime, to even the series. The deciding game proved to be a goaltending battle that Harvard led for over 35 minutes of game time. Clarkson's only goal in regulation game thanks to a power play marker from Martino but it was enough to push the match into extra time. The game went back and forth but this time it was Clarkson's turn to celebrate when Luka Sukovic scored into an empty cage thanks to a lucky bounce.

After escaping the tightly-contested series, the Knights continued their run against Dartmouth at the Herb Brooks Arena. Despite only being able to get 15 shots on goal for the game, Clarkson was able to score 4 goals and ride a strong performance from Langenegger to the win. By making their first championship appearance in 6 years, Clarkson was not just one win away from returning to the NCAA tournament. Unfortunately, they ran into Cornell in the midst of the Big Red recovering their championship form. Cornell got out to a 2-goal lead early in the first period and never looked back. Clarkson was able to find the back of the net once in the second but they could not secure the equalizer. They pulled Langenegger in desperation at the end of the third but the Big Red swiftly deposited the puck into the empty net and The Golden Knights' season came to a close.

== Departures ==
Player	Position	Nationality	Cause
Noah Beck	Defenseman	Canada	Graduate transfer to Arizona State
Eric Ciccolini	Forward	Canada	Graduation (retired)
Emmett Croteau	Goaltender	Canada	Transferred to Dartmouth
Daimon Gardner	Forward	Canada	Transferred to St. Cloud State
Mathieu Gosselin	Forward	Canada	Graduation (signed with Newfoundland Growlers)
Jack Judson	Defenseman	United States	Graduation (retired)
Dustyn McFaul	Defenseman	Canada	Graduation (signed with Florida Everblades)
Cody Monds	Forward	Canada	Transferred to Robert Morris
Austin Roden	Goaltender	Canada	Graduation (retired)
Anthony Romano	Forward	Canada	Graduation (signed with Texas Stars)
Jesse Tucker	Forward	Canada	Transferred to Northern Michigan

== Recruiting ==
Player	Position	Nationality	Age	Notes
Ryan Bottrill	Forward	United States	22	Scottsdale, AZ; transfer from Brown
Marcus Brännman	Goaltender	Sweden	21	Bromma, SWE; transfer from Providence
Ty Brassington	Defenseman	Canada	20	White Rock, BC
Garrett Dahm	Forward	United States	24	Swansea, IL; transfer from Mercyhurst
Ray Fust	Forward	Switzerland	21	Bellinzona, SUI; transfer from Omaha
Ethan Langenegger	Goaltender	Canada	24	Kamloops, BC; graduate transfer from Lake Superior State
Jared Mangan	Forward	United States	21	Charleston, SC
Shawn O'Donnell	Forward	United States	21	Pittsburgh, PA; transfer from Massachusetts Lowell
Luke Pakulak	Forward	Canada	21	Surrey, BC
Jack Sparkes	Defenseman	United States	20	Ottawa, ON; selected 180th overall in 2022
Luka Sukovic	Forward	United States	20	Lincolnshire, IL
Tate Taylor	Defenseman	Canada	20	Richmond, BC

== Roster ==
As of August 9, 2024.

No.	Nat.	Player	Class	Pos	Height	Weight	DoB	Hometown	Previous team	NHL rights
1	(Canada)	Ethan Langenegger	Graduate	G	6' 0" (1.83 m)	187 lb (85 kg)	2000-09-10	Kamloops, British Columbia	Lake Superior State (CCHA)	—
3	(United States)	Kaelan Taylor (C)	Graduate	D	6' 2" (1.88 m)	185 lb (84 kg)	1999-01-03	Oceanside, California	Dubuque Fighting Saints (USHL)	—
4	(Canada)	Trey Taylor	Junior	D	6' 2" (1.88 m)	190 lb (86 kg)	2002-02-04	Richmond, British Columbia	Youngstown Phantoms (USHL)	—
5	(United States)	Tristan Sarsland	Junior	D	6' 0" (1.83 m)	185 lb (84 kg)	2004-02-25	Wayzata, Minnesota	Benilde-St. Margaret's (USHS–MN)	—
6	(Canada)	Ryan Richardson (C)	Senior	F	6' 1" (1.85 m)	185 lb (84 kg)	2001-04-09	Stittsville, Ontario	Fargo (USHL)	—
8	(United States)	Carter Rose	Sophomore	D	6' 2" (1.88 m)	195 lb (88 kg)	2002-08-09	Brasher Falls, New York	Green Bay Gamblers (USHL)	—
9	(United States)	Erik Bargholtz	Junior	F	6' 2" (1.88 m)	195 lb (88 kg)	2001-04-12	Appleton, Wisconsin	Fargo Force (USHL)	—
10	(Canada)	Brady Egan	Junior	F	5' 10" (1.78 m)	175 lb (79 kg)	2001-10-09	Carp, Ontario	Bismarck Bobcats (NAHL)	—
11	(United States)	Luka Sukovic	Freshman	F	6' 3" (1.91 m)	201 lb (91 kg)	2003-11-06	Lincolnshire, Illinois	Bonnyville Pontiacs (AJHL)	—
12	(United States)	Caden Lewandowski	Senior	D	6' 4" (1.93 m)	205 lb (93 kg)	2000-06-02	Mars, Pennsylvania	Johnstown Tomahawks (NAHL)	—
13	(United States)	Shawn O'Donnell	Sophomore	F	5' 11" (1.8 m)	181 lb (82 kg)	2003-06-21	Pittsburgh, Pennsylvania	Massachusetts Lowell (HEA)	—
14	(United States)	Talon Sigurdson	Sophomore	F	6' 1" (1.85 m)	175 lb (79 kg)	2002-01-11	Sartell, Minnesota	Des Moines Buccaneers (USHL)	—
15	(Canada)	Ayrton Martino	Senior	F	5' 11" (1.8 m)	167 lb (76 kg)	2002-09-28	Toronto, Ontario	Omaha Lancers (USHL)	DAL, 73rd overall 2021
16	(United States)	Ryan Bottrill	Junior	F	6' 1" (1.85 m)	185 lb (84 kg)	2002-02-04	Chandler, Arizona	Brown (ECAC)	—
18	(Switzerland)	Ray Fust	Junior	F	6' 3" (1.91 m)	204 lb (93 kg)	2002-10-23	Bellinzona, Switzerland	Omaha (NCHC)	—
19	(Canada)	Ellis Rickwood	Junior	F	6' 2" (1.88 m)	200 lb (91 kg)	2002-07-02	Brantford, Ontario	Victoria Grizzlies (BCHL)	—
20	(United States)	Jared Mangan	Freshman	F	5' 10" (1.78 m)	172 lb (78 kg)	2003-04-08	Charleston, South Carolina	Lincoln Stars (USHL)	—
21	(United States)	George Grannis	Senior	F	6' 0" (1.83 m)	195 lb (88 kg)	2000-04-16	Duluth, Minnesota	Bismarck Bobcats (NAHL)	—
23	(Sweden)	Oliver Moberg	Sophomore	F	6' 3" (1.91 m)	210 lb (95 kg)	2003-02-23	Bromma, Sweden	Dubuque Fighting Saints (USHL)	—
26	(United States)	Garrett Dahm	Junior	F	6' 1" (1.85 m)	175 lb (79 kg)	2000-06-29	Belleville, Illinois	Mercyhurst (AHA)	—
27	(Canada)	Tate Taylor	Freshman	D	5' 11" (1.8 m)	174 lb (79 kg)	2004-05-03	Richmond, British Columbia	Fargo Force (USHL)	—
28	(United States)	Ryan Taylor	Junior	F	6' 3" (1.91 m)	210 lb (95 kg)	2001-03-19	St. Peters, Missouri	Bismarck Bobcats (NAHL)	—
29	(Canada)	Luke Pakulak	Freshman	F	6' 4" (1.93 m)	205 lb (93 kg)	2003-07-30	Surrey, British Columbia	Vernon Vipers (BCHL)	—
30	(Sweden)	Marcus Brännman	Sophomore	G	5' 11" (1.8 m)	166 lb (75 kg)	2003-04-06	Bromma, Sweden	Providence (HEA)	—
34	(Canada)	Brady Parker	Senior	G	5' 10" (1.78 m)	180 lb (82 kg)	2000-07-10	Calgary, Alberta	Okotoks Oilers (AJHL)	—
44	(Canada)	Ty Brassington	Freshman	D	6' 1" (1.85 m)	185 lb (84 kg)	2004-04-14	White Rock, British Columbia	Surrey Eagles (BCHL)	—
55	(Canada)	Jack Sparkes	Freshman	D	6' 8" (2.03 m)	238 lb (108 kg)	2003-10-20	Ottawa, Ontario	Chilliwack Chiefs (BCHL)	LAK, 180th overall 2022

== Standings ==
2024–25 ECAC Hockey Standings
	Conference record										Overall record					
	GP	W	L	T	OTW	OTL	SW	PTS	GF	GA	GP	W	L	T	GF	GA
#15 Quinnipiac †	22	16	5	1	2	3	0	50	79	42	38	24	12	2	135	83
#20 Clarkson	22	15	6	1	2	1	0	45	74	47	39	24	12	3	121	87
Colgate	22	13	7	2	2	2	1	42	80	65	36	18	15	3	114	116
Union	22	12	8	2	0	0	2	40	67	61	36	19	14	3	112	109
Dartmouth	22	12	9	1	0	2	0	39	70	52	33	18	13	2	110	84
#12 Cornell *	22	10	8	4	1	0	3	36	69	53	36	19	11	6	112	82
Harvard	22	9	10	3	2	2	1	31	56	56	33	13	17	3	85	97
Brown	22	9	11	2	3	0	2	28	53	63	32	14	15	3	79	85
Princeton	22	7	12	3	2	2	1	25	55	73	30	12	15	3	71	86
Rensselaer	22	7	15	0	0	2	0	23	57	82	35	12	21	2	101	131
Yale	22	5	14	3	1	1	1	19	52	80	30	6	21	3	67	121
St. Lawrence	22	5	15	2	1	1	1	18	43	81	35	9	24	2	71	121
Championship: March 22, 2025 † indicates conference regular season champion (Cleary Cup) * indicates conference tournament champion (Whitelaw Cup); Rankings: USCHO.com Top 20 Poll

== Schedule and results ==
Date	Time	Opponent^{#}	Rank^{#}	Site	TV	Decision	Result	Attendance	Record
Regular Season
October 5	7:00 pm	Canisius*		Cheel Arena • Potsdam, New York	ESPN+	Langenegger	W 2–1	3,030	1–0–0
October 6	4:00 pm	RIT*		Cheel Arena • Potsdam, New York	ESPN+	Brännman	L 2–3	2,136	1–1–0
October 11	7:00 pm	Niagara*		Cheel Arena • Potsdam, New York	ESPN+	Langenegger	W 4–2	1,891	2–1–0
October 12	7:00 pm	#20 Notre Dame*		Cheel Arena • Potsdam, New York	ESPN+	Langenegger	L 2–5	3,110	2–2–0
October 19	7:00 pm	at Vermont*		Gutterson Fieldhouse • Burlington, Vermont	ESPN+	Langenegger	W 3–1	2,954	3–2–0
October 25	7:00 pm	at Michigan Tech*		MacInnes Student Ice Arena • Houghton, Michigan	Midco Sports+	Langenegger	W 4–1	3,109	4–2–0
October 26	7:00 pm	at Michigan Tech*		MacInnes Student Ice Arena • Houghton, Michigan	Midco Sports+	Langenegger	W 2–1 ^{OT}	3,116	5–2–0
November 1	7:00 pm	Alaska*		Cheel Arena • Potsdam, New York	ESPN+	Langenegger	L 1–3	2,352	5–3–0
November 2	7:00 pm	Alaska*		Cheel Arena • Potsdam, New York	ESPN+	Brännman	T 3–3 ^{OT}	2,633	5–3–1
November 9	7:00 pm	Stonehill*		Cheel Arena • Potsdam, New York	ESPN+	Langenegger	W 6–3	2,658	6–3–1
November 15	7:00 pm	at Rensselaer		Houston Field House • Troy, New York (Rivalry)	ESPN+	Langenegger	W 3–1	2,451	7–3–1 (1–0–0)
November 16	7:00 pm	at Union		Achilles Rink • Schenectady, New York	ESPN+	Langenegger	W 4–1	2,061	8–3–1 (2–0–0)
November 22	7:00 pm	Brown	#19	Cheel Arena • Potsdam, New York	ESPN+	Langenegger	L 0–1	2,648	8–4–1 (2–1–0)
November 23	7:00 pm	Yale	#19	Cheel Arena • Potsdam, New York	ESPN+	Langenegger	W 4–0	2,720	9–4–1 (3–1–0)
Adirondack Winter Invitational
November 29	7:30 pm	vs. #10 Providence*	#20	Herb Brooks Arena • Lake Placid, New York (Winter Invitational Game 1)	ESPN+	Langenegger	L 2–3 ^{OT}	2,407	9–5–1
November 30	7:30 pm	vs. #16 Massachusetts Lowell*	#20	Herb Brooks Arena • Lake Placid, New York (Winter Invitational Game 2)	ESPN+	Langenegger	T 4–4 ^{SOL}	2,239	9–5–2
December 6	7:00 pm	at Harvard	#20	Bright-Landry Hockey Center • Boston, Massachusetts	ESPN+	Langenegger	W 4–3	1,580	10–5–2 (4–1–0)
December 7	7:00 pm	at #13 Dartmouth	#20	Thompson Arena • Hanover, New Hampshire	ESPN+	Langenegger	W 3–2	1,874	11–5–2 (5–1–0)
December 29	1:00 pm	Concordia*	#20	Cheel Arena • Potsdam, New York (Exhibition)	ESPN+	Parker	L 1–5		
January 10	7:00 pm	Union	#19	Cheel Arena • Potsdam, New York	ESPN+	Langenegger	W 5–3	2,473	12–5–2 (6–1–0)
January 11	7:00 pm	Rensselaer	#19	Cheel Arena • Potsdam, New York (Rivalry)	ESPN+	Langenegger	L 1–4	2,732	12–6–2 (6–2–0)
January 17	7:00 pm	at Yale	#20	Ingalls Rink • New Haven, Connecticut	ESPN+	Langenegger	W 7–4	1,607	13–6–2 (7–2–0)
January 18	7:00 pm	at Brown	#20	Meehan Auditorium • Providence, Rhode Island	ESPN+	Langenegger	L 2–3	1,112	13–7–2 (7–3–0)
January 24	7:00 pm	at St. Lawrence	#20	Appleton Arena • Canton, New York (Rivalry)	ESPN+	Langenegger	W 5–2	2,833	14–7–2 (8–3–0)
January 25	7:00 pm	at St. Lawrence	#20	Cheel Arena • Potsdam, New York (Rivalry)	ESPN+	Langenegger	L 1–2	3,584	14–8–2 (8–4–0)
January 31	7:00 pm	Colgate		Cheel Arena • Potsdam, New York	ESPN+	Langenegger	L 0–2	2,064	14–9–2 (8–5–0)
February 1	7:00 pm	Cornell		Cheel Arena • Potsdam, New York	ESPN+	Langenegger	T 3–3 ^{SOL}	2,891	14–9–3 (8–5–1)
February 7	7:00 pm	at Princeton		Hobey Baker Memorial Rink • Princeton, New Jersey	ESPN+	Brännman	W 4–1	1,558	15–9–3 (9–5–1)
February 8	7:00 pm	at #14 Quinnipiac		M&T Bank Arena • Hamden, Connecticut	ESPN+	Langenegger	W 3–2 ^{OT}	2,876	16–9–3 (10–5–1)
February 14	7:00 pm	Dartmouth		Cheel Arena • Potsdam, New York	ESPN+	Langenegger	W 4–1	2,039	17–9–3 (11–5–1)
February 15	7:00 pm	Harvard		Cheel Arena • Potsdam, New York	ESPN+	Brännman	W 6–0	2,586	18–9–3 (12–5–1)
February 21	7:00 pm	at Cornell	#19	Lynah Rink • Ithaca, New York	ESPN+	Langenegger	W 3–1	4,267	19–9–3 (13–5–1)
February 22	7:00 pm	at Colgate	#19	Class of 1965 Arena • Hamilton, New York	ESPN+	Langenegger	W 5–3	1,374	20–9–3 (14–5–1)
February 28	7:00 pm	#13 Quinnipiac	#19	Cheel Arena • Potsdam, New York	ESPN+	Langenegger	W 4–3 ^{OT}	2,834	21–9–3 (15–5–1)
March 1	7:00 pm	Princeton	#19	Cheel Arena • Potsdam, New York	ESPN+	Parker	L 3–4 ^{OT}	2,712	21–10–3 (15–6–1)
ECAC Hockey Tournament
March 14	7:00 pm	Harvard*	#18	Cheel Arena • Potsdam, New York (ECAC Quarterfinal Game 1)	ESPN+	Langenegger	W 3–2	2,466	22–10–3
March 15	4:00 pm	Harvard*	#18	Cheel Arena • Potsdam, New York (ECAC Quarterfinal Game 2)	ESPN+	Langenegger	L 2–3 ^{OT}	2,492	22–11–3
March 16	4:00 pm	Harvard*	#18	Cheel Arena • Potsdam, New York (ECAC Quarterfinal Game 3)	ESPN+	Langenegger	W 2–1 ^{OT}	2,069	23–11–3
March 21	7:00 pm	vs. Dartmouth*	#18	Herb Brooks Arena • Lake Placid, New York (ECAC Semifinal)	ESPN+	Langenegger	W 4–1	5,320	24–11–3
March 22	5:00 pm	vs. Cornell*	#18	Herb Brooks Arena • Lake Placid, New York (ECAC Championship)	ESPN+	Langenegger	L 1–3	5,965	24–12–3
*Non-conference game. ^{#}Rankings from USCHO.com Poll. All times are in Eastern Time. Source:

== Scoring statistics ==
Name	Position	Games	Goals	Assists	Points	PIM
Ayrton Martino	LW	39	25	26	51	8
Ellis Rickwood	C	39	10	25	35	22
Ryan Richardson	LW	38	11	19	30	16
Trey Taylor	D	35	4	13	17	27
Tristan Sarsland	D	39	8	15	23	16
Ryan Bottrill	F	39	8	11	19	26
Talon Sigurdson	F	39	10	8	18	21
Luka Sukovic	F	36	7	9	16	16
Tate Taylor	D	33	3	13	16	10
Garrett Dahm	F	38	6	8	14	12
Erik Bargholtz	F	39	6	7	13	12
Jared Mangan	C	38	6	5	11	10
Ryan Taylor	F	31	3	7	10	4
Luke Pakulak	F	30	2	5	7	10
Ty Brassington	D	38	2	5	7	2
Kaelan Taylor	D	39	1	6	7	10
Jack Sparkes	D	38	1	4	5	50
Ray Fust	LW/RW	19	2	2	4	2
Shawn O'Donnell	F	39	1	3	4	16
Brady Egan	C	9	0	2	2	4
Carter Rose	D	25	0	2	2	10
Ethan Langenegger	G	36	0	1	1	0
Brady Parker	G	1	0	0	0	0
George Grannis	F	2	0	0	0	0
Caden Lewandowski	D	2	0	0	0	0
Marcus Brännman	G	5	0	0	0	2
Oliver Moberg	RW	13	0	0	0	6
Bench	–	–	–	–	–	10
Total			121	203	324	307

== Goaltending statistics ==
Name	Games	Minutes	Wins	Losses	Ties	Goals against	Saves	Shut outs	SV %	GAA
Marcus Brännman	5	269:19	2	1	1	7	79	1	.919	1.56
Ethan Langenegger	35	2073:53	22	10	2	74	786	1	.919	2.14
Brady Parker	1	20:34	0	1	0	1	6	0	.857	2.92
Empty Net	-	19:00	-	-	-	5	-	-	-	-
Total	39	2382:46	24	12	3	87	871	2	.909	2.19

== Rankings ==
Poll	Week																											
Poll	Pre	1	2	3	4	5	6	7	8	9	10	11	12	13	14	15	16	17	18	19	20	21	22	23	24	25	26	27 (Final)
USCHO.com	RV	NR	NR	NR	NR	NR	NR	19	20	20	20	20	–	20	19	20	20	RV	RV	RV	19	19	19	18	18	19	–	20
USA Hockey	RV	NR	NR	NR	NR	NR	NR	19	19	20	19	20	–	19	19	20	RV	RV	RV	RV	19	19	19	17	18	18	19	19

Note: USCHO did not release a poll in week 12 or 26.
Note: USA Hockey did not release a poll in week 12.

== Awards and honors ==
Player	Award	Ref
Ayrton Martino	AHCA All-American East First Team	
Trey Taylor	AHCA All-American East Second Team	
Ayrton Martino	ECAC Hockey Player of the Year	
Trey Taylor	ECAC Hockey Best Defensive Defenseman	
Ethan Langenegger	Ken Dryden Award	
Jean-François Houle	Tim Taylor Award	
Ethan Langenegger	All-ECAC Hockey First Team	
Trey Taylor	All-ECAC Hockey First Team	
Ayrton Martino	All-ECAC Hockey First Team	
Ellis Rickwood	All-ECAC Hockey First Team	
Tristan Sarsland	All-ECAC Hockey Second Team	
Dalton Bancroft	All-ECAC Hockey Second Team	
Tate Taylor	ECAC Hockey All-Rookie Team	
Trey Taylor	ECAC Hockey All-Tournament Team	
Ayrton Martino	ECAC Hockey All-Tournament Team	
