= 2024–25 St. Lawrence Saints men's ice hockey season =

- Conference: 12th ECAC Hockey
- Home ice: Appleton Arena

Rankings
- USCHO: NR
- USA Hockey: NR

Record
- Overall: 9–24–2
- Conference: 5–15–2
- Home: 7–9–0
- Road: 2–13–2
- Neutral: 0–2–0

Coaches and captains
- Head coach: Brent Brekke
- Assistant coaches: Tommy Hill; Mike Aikens; Cam Doomany
- Captains: Drake Burgin; Philippe Chapleau; Ty Naaykens; Mason Waite

The 2024–25 St. Lawrence Saints Men's ice hockey season was the 85th season of play for the program and the 64th in ECAC Hockey. The Saints represented St. Lawrence University in the 2024–25 NCAA Division I men's ice hockey season, played their home games at the Appleton Arena and were coached by Brent Brekke in his 6th season.

== Season ==
St. Lawrence began the season in decent order, winning four of their first six games. Though the Saints played an array of very poor opponents, the team's offense performed well, averaging more than 3 goals per game. Mason Kucenski backed up the team with a solid start in goal, posting a save percentage of .930 through the first three weeks. Unfortunately, very little went right for the Larries afterwards. Once they began to face stiffer opposition, the offense dried up and the Saints lost nine consecutive. The team was only able to score eight goals over that span and sunk towards the bottom of the national rankings. While the scoring would pick up slightly afterwards, it remained paltry for the remainder of the year. The situating got even worse when the Saints' then-leading scorer, Tomáš Mazura, left after the fall semester and signed a professional contract. While the club brought in Caden Casey as a replacement, that couldn't stop the Larries from finishing with the worst offense in the conference and third lowest in the country.

By the beginning of December, St. Lawrence was effectively out of the running for a playoff spot but the team could still play spoiler. The Saints did just that when they ended their losing streak by downing #13 Dartmouth and later, after the winter break, defeated long-time rival Clarkson and perennial power Cornell. The three upset performances by the Larries caused each of those three teams to fall short of the tournament bubble by the end of the season, preventing either of them from earning an at-large bid.

Though the Saints were able to post a few shining moments throughout the season, the team did finish last in the standings, posing its worst record since Brekke's inaugural season behind the bench. St. Lawrence entered the postseason having lost their previous four games and would have to first fight through Dartmouth if they wanted to reach double-digit wins. Unfortunately, the Big Green were looking for revenge after losing both of the regular season matches and hammered the Larries. St. Lawrence got just 18 shots on goal all night and, although they were able to score twice, were completely dominated by Dartmouth's speedy offense. Kucenski did what he could but ended up allowing 4 goals on 37 shots while 2 empty-netters ended both the match and their season.

== Departures ==
Player	Position	Nationality	Cause
Grant Adams	Goaltender	United States	Graduate transfer to St. Norbert
Josh Boyer	Forward	United States	Graduation (signed with Atlanta Gladiators)
Cameron Buhl	Forward	United States	Graduation (signed with Utah Grizzlies)
Max Dorrington	Forward	United States	Graduate transfer to Sacred Heart
Luke Erickson	Defenseman	United States	Graduation (retired)
Ben Kraws	Goaltender	United States	Graduation (signed with Dallas Stars)
Tomáš Mazura	Forward	Czech Republic	Left program mid-season (signed with BK Mladá Boleslav)
Tucker McIntosh	Defenseman	Canada	Graduation (retired)
Anthony Mollica	Defenseman	United States	Transferred to Adrian
Reilly Moran	Forward	United States	Graduation (signed with Diables Rouges de Valenciennes)
Justin Paul	Forward	Canada	Graduate transfer to Lakehead
Logan Ritchie	Forward	United States	Graduation (retired)
Luc Salem	Defenseman	United States	Graduation (signed with Utah Grizzlies)
Nick Trela	Forward	United States	Graduate transfer to Long Island

== Recruiting ==
Player	Position	Nationality	Age	Notes
Isack Bandu	Defenseman	Canada	23	Notre-Dame-de-l'Île-Perrot, QC; transfer from Northern Michigan
Dominic Basse	Goaltender	United States	23	Alexandria, VA; graduate transfer from St. Cloud State; selected 167th overall in 2019
Spencer Bell	Forward	Canada	20	Warman, SK
Nicholas Beneteau	Defenseman	Canada	21	Windsor, ON
Jake Bernadet	Forward	United States	21	South Burlington, VT
Caden Casey	Forward	United States	19	Elk River, MN; joined mid-season
Reilly Connors	Forward	United States	24	Madison, CT; transfer from Yale
Sam Hall	Defenseman	United States	19	Far Hills, NJ
Evan Orloff	Defenseman	United States	21	Kensington, MD; transfer from Yale
Isaac Tremblay	Forward	Canada	19	Granby, QC
Gabriel Westling	Forward	Sweden	20	Mora, SWE
Jack Wieneke	Goaltender	United States	21	Plymouth, MN

== Roster ==
As of January 1, 2025.

No.	Nat.	Player	Class	Pos	Height	Weight	DoB	Hometown	Previous team	NHL rights
1	(United States)	Cameron Smith	Sophomore	G	6' 2" (1.88 m)	175 lb (79 kg)	2002-01-21	Westchester, New York	P.A.L. Jr. Islanders (NCDC)	—
3	(United States)	Evan Orloff	Freshman	D	6' 3" (1.91 m)	194 lb (88 kg)	2003-03-09	Kensington, Maryland	Maine Nordiques (NAHL)	—
4	(Canada)	Mason Waite (C)	Senior	D	6' 1" (1.85 m)	200 lb (91 kg)	2000-04-04	Winnipeg, Manitoba	Prince George Spruce Kings (BCHL)	—
7	(United States)	Sam Hall	Freshman	D	6' 2" (1.88 m)	174 lb (79 kg)	2004-12-16	Far Hills, New Jersey	Okotoks Oilers (BCHL)	—
8	(Canada)	Oak MacLeod	Senior	F	5' 10" (1.78 m)	180 lb (82 kg)	2002-04-04	Caledonia, Ontario	Jersey Hitmen (NCDC)	—
9	(Canada)	Philippe Chapleau (C)	Senior	D	5' 9" (1.75 m)	180 lb (82 kg)	2000-07-06	Longueuil, Quebec	Penticton Vees (BCHL)	—
11	(United States)	Will Arquiett	Senior	F	5' 8" (1.73 m)	170 lb (77 kg)	2000-06-25	Brasher Falls, New York	Aberdeen Wings (NAHL)	—
12	(Canada)	Greg Lapointe	Senior	F	5' 9" (1.75 m)	175 lb (79 kg)	2001-01-01	Granby, Quebec	Coquitlam Express (BCHL)	—
13	(United States)	Reilly Connors	Graduate	F	6' 1" (1.85 m)	190 lb (86 kg)	2000-03-17	Madison, Connecticut	Yale (ECAC)	—
14	(United States)	Cayden Casey	Freshman	F	6' 1" (1.85 m)	174 lb (79 kg)	2004-10-07	Elk River, Minnesota	Cedar Rapids RoughRiders (USAL)	—
15	(Canada)	Evan Mitchell	Sophomore	D	5' 11" (1.8 m)	185 lb (84 kg)	2002-02-13	Winnipeg, Manitoba	Cranbrook Bucks (BCHL)	—
16	(Canada)	Drake Burgin (C)	Senior	D	5' 11" (1.8 m)	180 lb (82 kg)	2000-10-22	Kanata, Ontario	Blackfalds Bulldogs (AJHL)	—
17	(Sweden)	Gabe Westling	Freshman	F	6' 4" (1.93 m)	203 lb (92 kg)	2003-10-18	Mora, Sweden	Nanaimo Clippers (BCHL)	—
18	(Canada)	Tyler Cristall	Junior	F	5' 9" (1.75 m)	170 lb (77 kg)	2002-05-13	Vancouver, British Columbia	West Kelowna Warriors (NAHL)	—
19	(United States)	Jacob Bernadet	Freshman	F	5' 10" (1.78 m)	161 lb (73 kg)	2003-09-12	South Burlington, Vermont	Maine Nordiques (NAHL)	—
21	(Canada)	Isack Bandu	Junior	D	6' 2" (1.88 m)	195 lb (88 kg)	2001-05-03	Montreal, Quebec	Northern Michigan (CCHA)	—
22	(Canada)	Ty Naaykens (C)	Senior	F	6' 1" (1.85 m)	185 lb (84 kg)	2001-01-27	Winnipeg, Manitoba	Fairbanks Ice Dogs (NAHL)	—
23	(United States)	Jan Olenginski	Sophomore	F	5' 9" (1.75 m)	165 lb (75 kg)	2003-03-23	Philadelphia, Pennsylvania	Madison Capitols (USHL)	—
24	(Canada)	Spencer Bell	Freshman	F	6' 0" (1.83 m)	190 lb (86 kg)	2003-10-04	Warman, Saskatchewan	Humboldt Broncos (SJHL)	—
25	(Latvia)	Fēlikss Gavars	Junior	F	5' 11" (1.8 m)	184 lb (83 kg)	2002-05-15	Riga, Latvia	Fargo Force (USHL)	—
26	(United States)	Jake Lammens	Sophomore	D	6' 1" (1.85 m)	185 lb (84 kg)	2002-10-03	Norwalk, Connecticut	Salmon Arm Silverbacks (BCHL)	—
27	(Canada)	Isaac Tremblay	Freshman	F	6' 1" (1.85 m)	170 lb (77 kg)	2004-09-24	Granby, Quebec	Vernon Vipers (BCHL)	—
28	(Canada)	Nicholas Beneteau	Freshman	F	6' 3" (1.91 m)	192 lb (87 kg)	2003-09-12	Windsor, Ontario	Alberni Valley Bulldogs (BCHL)	—
29	(United States)	Gunnar Thoreson	Sophomore	F	5' 10" (1.78 m)	185 lb (84 kg)	2002-03-19	Andover, Minnesota	Minnesota Wilderness (NAHL)	—
31	(United States)	Dominic Basse	Graduate	G	6' 6" (1.98 m)	185 lb (84 kg)	2001-04-22	Alexandria, Virginia	St. Cloud State (NCHC)	CHI, 167th overall 2019
32	(United States)	Mason Kucenski	Sophomore	G	6' 3" (1.91 m)	175 lb (79 kg)	2002-04-08	Gill, Massachusetts	Madison Capitols (USHL)	—
33	(United States)	Jack Wieneke	Freshman	G	6' 1" (1.85 m)	185 lb (84 kg)	2003-03-08	Plymouth, Minnesota	Lone Star Brahmas (NAHL)	—
34	(Slovakia)	Ján Lašák	Junior	F	6' 1" (1.85 m)	200 lb (91 kg)	2002-08-11	Šurany, Slovakia	Janesville Jets (NAHL)	—

== Standings ==
2024–25 ECAC Hockey Standings
	Conference record										Overall record					
	GP	W	L	T	OTW	OTL	SW	PTS	GF	GA	GP	W	L	T	GF	GA
#15 Quinnipiac †	22	16	5	1	2	3	0	50	79	42	38	24	12	2	135	83
#20 Clarkson	22	15	6	1	2	1	0	45	74	47	39	24	12	3	121	87
Colgate	22	13	7	2	2	2	1	42	80	65	36	18	15	3	114	116
Union	22	12	8	2	0	0	2	40	67	61	36	19	14	3	112	109
Dartmouth	22	12	9	1	0	2	0	39	70	52	33	18	13	2	110	84
#12 Cornell *	22	10	8	4	1	0	3	36	69	53	36	19	11	6	112	82
Harvard	22	9	10	3	2	2	1	31	56	56	33	13	17	3	85	97
Brown	22	9	11	2	3	0	2	28	53	63	32	14	15	3	79	85
Princeton	22	7	12	3	2	2	1	25	55	73	30	12	15	3	71	86
Rensselaer	22	7	15	0	0	2	0	23	57	82	35	12	21	2	101	131
Yale	22	5	14	3	1	1	1	19	52	80	30	6	21	3	67	121
St. Lawrence	22	5	15	2	1	1	1	18	43	81	35	9	24	2	71	121
Championship: March 22, 2025 † indicates conference regular season champion (Cleary Cup) * indicates conference tournament champion (Whitelaw Cup); Rankings: USCHO.com Top 20 Poll

== Schedule and results ==
Date	Time	Opponent^{#}	Rank^{#}	Site	TV	Decision	Result	Attendance	Record
Regular Season
October 5	7:00 pm	RIT*		Appleton Arena • Canton, New York	ESPN+	Kucenski	W 3–2 ^{OT}	1,235	1–0–0
October 6	4:00 pm	Canisius*		Appleton Arena • Canton, New York	ESPN+	Kucenski	W 5–2	1,079	2–0–0
October 11	7:00 pm	#20 Notre Dame*		Appleton Arena • Canton, New York	ESPN+	Kucenski	L 1–4	1,510	2–1–0
October 12	7:00 pm	Niagara*		Appleton Arena • Canton, New York	ESPN+	Kucenski	W 4–3	1,250	3–1–0
October 18	7:00 pm	Ferris State*		Appleton Arena • Canton, New York	ESPN+	Kucenski	L 0–1	—	3–2–0
October 19	7:00 pm	Ferris State*		Appleton Arena • Canton, New York	ESPN+	Kucenski	W 8–0	905	4–2–0
October 25	7:00 pm	at Penn State*		Pegula Ice Arena • University Park, Pennsylvania		Kucenski	L 2–3	6,292	4–3–0
October 26	4:00 pm	at Penn State*		Pegula Ice Arena • University Park, Pennsylvania		Kucenski	L 1–3	6,141	4–4–0
November 1	7:00 pm	at Stonehill*		Bridgewater Ice Arena • Bridgewater, Massachusetts	NEC Front Row	Basse	L 0–4	154	4–5–0
November 8	7:30 pm	at Simon Fraser*		Appleton Arena • Canton, New York (Exhibition)	ESPN+		W 4–0	1,005	
November 15	7:00 pm	at Union		Achilles Rink • Schenectady, New York	ESPN+	Kucenski	L 0–4	1,724	4–6–0 (0–1–0)
November 16	7:00 pm	at Rensselaer		Houston Field House • Troy, New York	ESPN+	Kucenski	L 2–3	1,885	4–7–0 (0–2–0)
November 22	7:00 pm	Yale		Appleton Arena • Canton, New York	ESPN+	Kucenski	L 1–5	851	4–8–0 (0–3–0)
November 23	7:00 pm	Brown		Appleton Arena • Canton, New York	ESPN+	Basse	L 1–2 ^{OT}	1,042	4–9–0 (0–4–0)
Adirondack Winter Invitational
November 29	4:00 pm	vs. #16 Massachusetts Lowell*		Herb Brooks Arena • Lake Placid, New York (Winter Invitational Game 1)	ESPN+	Kucenski	L 0–2	2,407	4–10–0
November 30	4:00 pm	vs. #10 Providence*		Herb Brooks Arena • Lake Placid, New York (Winter Invitational Game 2)	ESPN+	Basse	L 1–2	2,237	4–11–0
December 6	7:00 pm	at #13 Dartmouth		Thompson Arena • Hanover, New Hampshire	ESPN+	Kucenski	W 3–2	2,018	5–11–0 (1–4–0)
December 7	7:00 pm	at Harvard		Bright-Landry Hockey Center • Boston, Massachusetts	ESPN+	Kucenski	T 0–0 ^{SOL}	—	5–11–1 (1–4–1)
January 4	7:00 pm	at Vermont*		Gutterson Fieldhouse • Burlington, Vermont	ESPN+	Kucenski	L 1–8	3,325	5–12–1
January 10	7:00 pm	Rensselaer		Appleton Arena • Canton, New York	ESPN+	Basse	W 4–1	616	6–12–1 (2–4–1)
January 11	7:00 pm	Union		Appleton Arena • Canton, New York	ESPN+	Kucenski	L 4–1	1,116	6–13–1 (2–5–1)
January 17	7:00 pm	at Brown		Meehan Auditorium • Providence, Rhode Island	ESPN+	Kucenski	L 2–3	1,072	6–14–1 (2–6–1)
January 18	7:00 pm	at Yale		Ingalls Rink • New Haven, Connecticut	ESPN+	Kucenski	L 2–3	1,835	6–15–1 (2–7–1)
January 24	7:00 pm	#20 Clarkson		Appleton Arena • Canton, New York (Rivalry)	ESPN+	Kucenski	L 2–5	2,833	6–16–1 (2–8–1)
January 25	7:00 pm	at #20 Clarkson		Cheel Arena • Potsdam, New York (Rivalry)	ESPN+	Kucenski	W 2–1	3,584	7–16–1 (3–8–1)
January 31	7:00 pm	Cornell		Appleton Arena • Canton, New York	ESPN+	Kucenski	W 2–1	1,326	8–16–1 (4–8–1)
February 1	7:00 pm	Colgate		Appleton Arena • Canton, New York	ESPN+	Kucenski	L 1–6	1,252	8–17–1 (4–9–1)
February 7	7:00 pm	at #14 Quinnipiac		M&T Bank Arena • Hamden, Connecticut	ESPN+	Kucenski	L 1–6	3,097	8–18–1 (4–10–1)
February 8	7:00 pm	at Princeton		Hobey Baker Memorial Rink • Princeton, New Jersey	ESPN+	Basse	T 4–4 ^{SOW}	1,725	8–18–2 (4–10–2)
February 14	7:00 pm	Harvard		Appleton Arena • Canton, New York	ESPN+	Basse	L 2–6	732	8–19–2 (4–11–2)
February 15	7:00 pm	Dartmouth		Appleton Arena • Canton, New York	ESPN+	Kucenski	W 3–2 ^{OT}	574	9–19–2 (5–11–2)
February 21	7:00 pm	at Colgate		Class of 1965 Arena • Hamilton, New York	ESPN+	Kucenski	L 4–5	974	9–20–2 (5–12–2)
February 22	7:00 pm	at Cornell		Lynah Rink • Ithaca, New York	ESPN+	Kucenski	L 0–6	4,267	9–21–2 (5–13–2)
February 28	7:00 pm	Princeton		Appleton Arena • Canton, New York	ESPN+	Kucenski	L 2–4	1,200	9–22–2 (5–14–2)
March 1	7:00 pm	#13 Quinnipiac		Appleton Arena • Canton, New York	ESPN+	Basse	L 0–4	1,302	9–23–2 (5–15–2)
ECAC Hockey Tournament
March 8	7:00 pm	at Dartmouth*		Thompson Arena • Hanover, New Hampshire (ECAC First Round)	ESPN+	Kucenski	L 2–6	2,248	9–24–2
*Non-conference game. ^{#}Rankings from USCHO.com Poll. All times are in Eastern Time. Source:

== Scoring statistics ==
Name	Position	Games	Goals	Assists	Points	PIM
Greg Lapointe	F	34	11	8	19	18
Tyler Cristall	F	29	8	9	17	12
Mason Waite	D	35	4	12	16	6
Fēlikss Gavars	F	34	6	9	15	25
Tomáš Mazura	C	17	1	13	14	4
Isaac Tremblay	D	33	4	8	12	25
Philippe Chapleau	D	35	3	8	11	12
Ty Naaykens	F	27	5	5	10	19
Reilly Connors	RW	35	2	7	9	24
Gabriel Westling	C	30	1	8	9	6
Gunnar Thoreson	C	33	5	3	8	8
Nicholas Beneteau	D	32	2	5	7	6
Isack Bandu	D	32	2	5	7	27
Drake Burgin	D	35	2	5	7	14
Ján Lašák	RW	16	4	2	6	10
Will Arquiett	F	27	4	2	6	10
Jan Olenginski	D	30	2	4	6	10
Spencer Bell	D	32	3	1	4	20
Caden Casey	F	13	1	3	4	17
Jake Bernadet	F	27	1	1	2	2
Evan Orloff	F	20	0	2	2	10
Sam Hall	D	24	0	2	2	8
Mason Kucenski	G	28	0	2	2	0
Oak MacLeod	RW	4	0	0	0	0
Evan Mitchell	D	6	0	0	0	0
Dominic Basse	G	10	0	0	0	0
Jake Lammens	F	24	0	0	0	2
Bench	–	–	–	–	–	12
Total			71	124	195	301

== Goaltending statistics ==
Name	Games	Minutes	Wins	Losses	Ties	Goals against	Saves	Shut outs	SV %	GAA
Mason Kucenski	28	1568:54	8	19	1	78	705	2	.900	2.98
Dominic Basse	10	506:39	1	5	1	29	245	0	.894	3.43
Empty Net	-	44:30	-	-	-	14	-	-	-	-
Total	35	2120:03	9	24	2	121	950	2	.887	3.42

== Rankings ==
Poll	Week																											
Poll	Pre	1	2	3	4	5	6	7	8	9	10	11	12	13	14	15	16	17	18	19	20	21	22	23	24	25	26	27 (Final)
USCHO.com	NR	NR	NR	NR	NR	NR	NR	NR	NR	NR	NR	NR	–	NR	NR	NR	NR	NR	NR	NR	NR	NR	NR	NR	NR	NR	–	NR
USA Hockey	NR	NR	NR	NR	NR	NR	NR	NR	NR	NR	NR	NR	–	NR	NR	NR	NR	NR	NR	NR	NR	NR	NR	NR	NR	NR	NR	NR

Note: USCHO did not release a poll in week 12 or 26.
Note: USA Hockey did not release a poll in week 12.

== Awards and honors ==
Player	Award	Ref
Mason Waite	ECAC Hockey Student-Athlete of the Year	

== 2025 NHL entry draft ==
Round	Pick	Player	NHL team
3	95	Teddy Mutryn ^{†}	San Jose Sharks
5	154	Jordan Charron ^{†}	Pittsburgh Penguins

† incoming freshman
