= 2024–25 NCAA Division I men's ice hockey season =

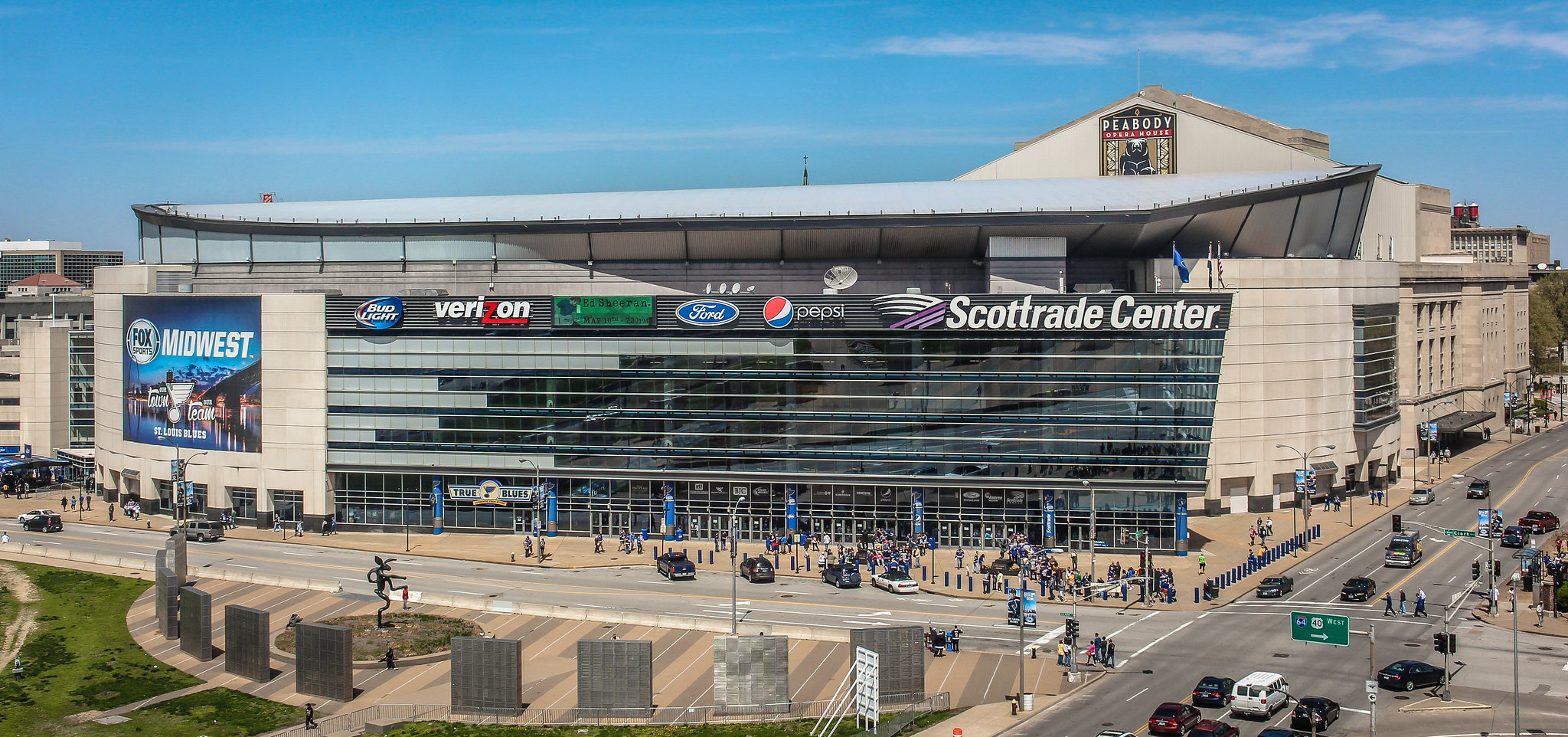
- Enterprise Center in St. Louis, Missouri hosted the 2025 Frozen Four.
- Duration: October 4, 2024– April 12, 2025
- NCAA tournament: 2025
- National championship: Enterprise Center; St. Louis, Missouri
- NCAA champion: Western Michigan
- Hobey Baker Award: Isaac Howard (Michigan State)

The 2024-25 NCAA Division I men's ice hockey season began on October 4, 2024 and concluded with the NCAA championship on April 12, 2025. This was the 77th season in which an NCAA ice hockey championship is being held and will be the US college hockey's 131st year overall.

== Conference realignment ==
Shortly after the 2023–24 season, the men's Atlantic Hockey Association and women's College Hockey America formally merged under the new name of Atlantic Hockey America, retaining the Association's AHA initialism. The merged league included all members of both predecessors.

Arizona State formally joined the NCHC, bringing the number of conference members up to nine. Initially, the league instituted a play-in game for the final quarterfinal spot in the NCHC tournament. However, due to the logistics of a play-in game prior to the quarterfinals being too complicated with travel and additional strain on student-athletes and staff, the play-in game was scrapped and only the top eight teams qualified for the NCHC tournament.

Augustana, which had joined the CCHA in 2023, had been scheduled to become a full-time member beginning with the 2025–26 season. However, despite only playing a partial conference schedule, the league decided to accelerate the Vikings assimilation into the league and made Augustana eligible for the conference tournament. Because Augustana's schedule had already been set prior to the announcement, the CCHA elected to have their conference standings decided by winning percentage of conference games. Despite this bringing the number of full conference members up to nine, the CCHA decided against expanding their conference tournament, meaning only the top eight CCHA teams qualified for the playoffs.

Shortly after the start of the season, American International College announced that its men's hockey team would leave AHA after the 2024–25 season and join the bulk of AIC's other sports in the Northeast-10 Conference, which plays the sport under NCAA Division II regulations and does not participate in the Division I championship.

== Regular season ==
=== Season tournaments ===
Tournament	Dates	Teams	Champion
Ice Breaker Tournament	October 11–12	4	Omaha
Adirondack Winter Invitational	November 29–30	4	Massachusetts Lowell
Friendship Four	November 29–30	4	Boston University
Holiday Face-Off	December 28–29	4	Wisconsin
Ledyard Bank Classic	December 28–29	4	Providence
Great Lakes Invitational	December 29–30	4	Michigan State
Coachella Valley Cactus Cup	January 3–4	4	Massachusetts Lowell
Desert Hockey Classic	January 3–4	4	Arizona State
Connecticut Ice	January 24–25	4	Connecticut
Beanpot	February 3, 10	4	Boston University

=== Standings ===
2024–25 Atlantic Hockey America Standings
	Conference record										Overall record					
	GP	W	L	T	OW	OL	SW	PTS	GF	GA	GP	W	L	T	GF	GA
Holy Cross †	26	19	5	2	4	0	1	56	92	47	40	24	14	2	130	94
Sacred Heart	26	16	7	3	1	1	2	53	80	64	39	21	13	5	118	101
#19 Bentley *	26	16	9	1	1	2	1	51	79	57	40	23	15	2	115	83
Niagara	26	15	9	2	3	3	1	48	90	70	37	18	16	3	124	109
Army	26	14	10	2	2	0	2	44	84	74	38	16	20	2	105	117
Canisius	26	11	13	2	0	3	0	38	84	79	37	12	23	2	98	120
Air Force	26	11	13	2	2	3	1	37	59	58	40	16	21	3	86	112
American International	26	9	16	1	0	3	0	31	63	77	38	13	23	2	92	117
RIT	26	9	15	2	2	0	1	28	65	102	35	10	23	2	82	133
Robert Morris	26	7	15	4	1	2	1	27	72	86	35	10	20	5	95	115
Mercyhurst	26	4	19	3	1	0	2	16	59	113	35	4	27	4	77	150
Championship: March 22, 2025 † indicates conference regular season champion (DeGregorio Trophy) * indicates conference tournament champion (Riley Trophy); Rankings: USCHO.com Top 20 Poll

2024–25 Big Ten ice hockey Standings
	Conference record										Overall record					
	GP	W	L	T	OTW	OTL	3/SW	PTS	GF	GA	GP	W	L	T	GF	GA
#6 Michigan State †*	24	15	5	4	2	1	2	50	92	60	37	26	7	4	129	77
#9 Minnesota †	24	15	6	3	1	3	0	50	87	62	40	25	11	4	154	101
#11 Ohio State	24	14	9	1	3	2	0	42	72	62	40	24	14	2	127	106
#17 Michigan	24	12	10	2	5	1	2	36	76	83	36	18	15	3	112	118
#5 Penn State	24	9	11	4	2	1	3	33	78	88	40	22	14	4	139	120
Wisconsin	24	7	16	1	1	6	0	27	64	77	37	13	21	3	108	110
Notre Dame	24	4	19	1	2	2	1	14	60	97	38	12	25	1	102	127
Championship: March 22, 2025 † indicates conference regular season champion * indicates conference tournament champion Rankings: USCHO.com Top 20 Poll

2024–25 Central Collegiate Hockey Association standings
	Conference record											Overall record					
	GP	W	L	T	OTW	OTL	SW	PTS	PCT ^	GF	GA	GP	W	L	T	GF	GA
#14 Minnesota State †*	26	18	5	3	3	1	1	56	.718	77	37	39	27	9	3	113	58
Augustana	16	9	5	2	1	1	1	30	.625	48	37	35	18	13	4	97	75
St. Thomas	26	13	9	4	1	1	1	42	.564	76	66	38	19	14	5	111	101
Bowling Green	26	12	10	4	2	3	2	43	.551	69	63	36	18	14	4	90	85
Michigan Tech	26	12	11	3	1	1	1	40	.513	75	69	36	16	17	3	95	96
Ferris State	26	12	13	1	1	0	0	36	.462	74	81	36	13	20	3	89	128
Bemidji State	26	10	12	4	3	1	4	36	.462	63	78	38	15	18	5	93	114
Lake Superior State	26	10	15	1	0	4	0	35	.449	71	76	36	12	22	2	93	115
Northern Michigan	26	4	20	2	1	1	2	16	.205	42	88	34	5	27	2	55	115
Championship: March 21, 2025 † indicates conference regular-season champion (MacNaughton Cup) * indicates conference tournament champion (Mason Cup)^ Because Augustana played a transition schedule of 16 games against conference opponents, winning percentage was used to determine conference position. Rankings: USCHO.com Top 20 Poll

2024–25 NCAA Division I Independent ice hockey standings
	Overall record					
	GP	W	L	T	GF	GA
Alaska	32	12	14	6	73	87
Alaska Anchorage	34	6	23	5	75	117
Lindenwood	32	8	22	2	65	86
Long Island	34	20	12	2	111	77
Stonehill	34	12	22	0	76	106
Rankings: USCHO.com Top 20 Poll

2024–25 ECAC Hockey Standings
	Conference record										Overall record					
	GP	W	L	T	OTW	OTL	SW	PTS	GF	GA	GP	W	L	T	GF	GA
#15 Quinnipiac †	22	16	5	1	2	3	0	50	79	42	38	24	12	2	135	83
#20 Clarkson	22	15	6	1	2	1	0	45	74	47	39	24	12	3	121	87
Colgate	22	13	7	2	2	2	1	42	80	65	36	18	15	3	114	116
Union	22	12	8	2	0	0	2	40	67	61	36	19	14	3	112	109
Dartmouth	22	12	9	1	0	2	0	39	70	52	33	18	13	2	110	84
#12 Cornell *	22	10	8	4	1	0	3	36	69	53	36	19	11	6	112	82
Harvard	22	9	10	3	2	2	1	31	56	56	33	13	17	3	85	97
Brown	22	9	11	2	3	0	2	28	53	63	32	14	15	3	79	85
Princeton	22	7	12	3	2	2	1	25	55	73	30	12	15	3	71	86
Rensselaer	22	7	15	0	0	2	0	23	57	82	35	12	21	2	101	131
Yale	22	5	14	3	1	1	1	19	52	80	30	6	21	3	67	121
St. Lawrence	22	5	15	2	1	1	1	18	43	81	35	9	24	2	71	121
Championship: March 22, 2025 † indicates conference regular season champion (Cleary Cup) * indicates conference tournament champion (Whitelaw Cup); Rankings: USCHO.com Top 20 Poll

2024–25 Hockey East Standings
	Conference record										Overall record					
	GP	W	L	T	OTW	OTL	SW	PTS	GF	GA	GP	W	L	T	GF	GA
#4 Boston College †	24	18	4	2	2	0	1	55	82	40	37	27	8	2	125	65
#8 Maine *	24	13	5	6	1	1	5	50	67	45	38	24	8	6	124	75
#2 Boston University	24	14	8	2	1	1	2	46	89	65	40	24	14	2	150	119
#7 Connecticut	24	12	8	4	3	2	1	40	76	65	39	23	12	4	130	97
#13 Providence	24	11	8	5	2	2	1	39	65	67	37	21	11	5	103	96
#10 Massachusetts	24	10	9	5	0	0	2	37	69	58	40	21	14	5	133	97
Massachusetts Lowell	24	8	13	3	0	1	2	30	57	69	36	16	16	4	93	101
Merrimack	24	9	14	1	1	0	1	28	57	81	35	13	21	1	81	112
Northeastern	24	7	14	3	1	1	2	26	48	71	37	14	20	3	88	112
New Hampshire	24	5	14	5	0	2	1	23	53	73	35	13	16	6	96	100
Vermont	24	6	16	2	2	3	1	22	59	88	35	11	21	3	100	116
Championship: March 21, 2025 † indicates regular season champion * indicates conference tournament champion (Lamoriello Trophy); Rankings: USCHO Division I Men's Poll

2024–25 National Collegiate Hockey Conference Standings
	Conference record										Overall record					
	GP	W	L	T	OTW	OTL	SW	PTS	GF	GA	GP	W	L	T	GF	GA
#1 Western Michigan †*	24	19	4	1	4	3	0	57	98	51	42	34	7	1	167	86
#16 Arizona State	24	14	9	1	2	5	1	47	91	69	37	21	14	2	136	103
#3 Denver	24	15	8	1	2	1	0	45	89	59	44	31	12	1	174	94
Omaha	24	14	9	1	1	1	1	44	82	69	36	18	17	1	105	99
#18 North Dakota	24	14	9	1	3	1	1	42	81	73	38	21	15	2	120	111
Colorado College	24	11	12	1	4	1	1	32	68	72	37	18	18	1	106	113
Minnesota Duluth	24	9	13	2	2	2	1	30	63	77	36	13	20	3	99	117
St. Cloud State	24	7	16	1	2	3	0	23	53	79	36	14	21	1	79	110
Miami	24	0	23	1	0	3	0	4	38	114	34	3	28	3	63	143
Championship: March 22, 2025 † indicates conference regular season champion (Penrose Cup) * indicates conference tournament champion (Frozen Faceoff Championship Trophy); Rankings: USCHO.com Top 20 Poll

== PairWise Rankings ==
The PairWise Rankings (PWR) are a statistical tool designed to approximate the process by which the NCAA selection committee decides which teams get at-large bids to the 16-team NCAA tournament. Although the NCAA selection committee does not use the PWR as presented by USCHO, the PWR has been accurate in predicting which teams will make the tournament field.

For Division I men, all teams are included in comparisons starting in the 2013–14 season (formerly, only teams with a Ratings Percentage Index of .500 or above, or teams under consideration, were included). The PWR method compares each team with every other such team, with the winner of each “comparison” earning one PWR point. After all comparisons are made, the points are totaled up and rankings listed accordingly.

With 64 Division I men's teams, the greatest number of PWR points any team could earn is 63, winning the comparison with every other team. Meanwhile, a team that lost all of its comparisons would have no PWR points.

Teams are then ranked by PWR point total, with ties broken by the teams’ RPI ratings, which starting in 2013–14 is weighted for home and road games and includes a quality wins bonus (QWB) for beating teams in the top 20 of the RPI (it also is weighted for home and road).

When it comes to comparing teams, the PWR uses three criteria which are combined to make a comparison: RPI, record against common opponents and head-to-head competition. Starting in 2013–14, the comparison of record against teams under consideration was dropped because all teams are now under comparison.

NCAA Division I Men's Hockey PairWise Rankings
Rank	Team	PWR	RPI	Conference
1	Boston College	63	.6080*	Hockey East
2	Michigan State	62	.6033*	Big Ten
3	Maine	61	.5896*	Hockey East
4	Western Michigan	60	.5878*	NCHC
5	Minnesota	59	.5803*	Big Ten
6	Connecticut	58	.5759*	Hockey East
7	Boston University	57	.5712	Hockey East
8	Providence	56	.5694	Hockey East
9	Denver	55	.5618*	NCHC
10	Ohio State	53	.5594	Big Ten
10	Massachusetts	53	.5564	Hockey East
12	Quinnipiac	52	.5515	ECAC Hockey
13	Penn State	51	.5514	Big Ten
14	Minnesota State	50	.4475*	CCHA
15	Michigan	49	.5466	Big Ten
16	Arizona State	48	.5425	NCHC
17	Cornell	47	.5374	ECAC Hockey
18	North Dakota	46	.5325	NCHC
19	Massachusetts Lowell	45	.5324	Hockey East
20	Clarkson	43	.5252	ECAC Hockey
21	New Hampshire	42	.5238	Hockey East
22	Bentley	41	.5228	AHA
22	Dartmouth	41	.5208	ECAC Hockey
24	Northeastern	40	.5187	Hockey East
25	Long Island	38	.5138	Independent
25	Holy Cross	38	.5124	AHA
27	Sacred Heart	37	.5113	AHA
28	Wisconsin	36	.5091	Big Ten
29	Colgate	35	.5085	ECAC Hockey
30	Omaha	34	.5046	NCHC
31	St. Thomas	32	.5006	CCHA
31	Merrimack	32	.4996	Hockey East
33	Colorado College	31	.5006	NCHC
34	Vermont	30	.4978	Hockey East
34	Augustana	30	.4966	CCHA
36	St. Cloud State	28	.4955	NCHC
37	Union	27	.4962	ECAC Hockey
38	Harvard	25	.4923	ECAC Hockey
38	Bowling Green	25	.4889	CCHA
38	Alaska	25	.4877	Independent
38	Notre Dame	25	.4875	Big Ten
42	Minnesota Duluth	22	.4846	NCHC
42	Princeton	22	.4830	ECAC Hockey
42	Brown	22	.4822	ECAC Hockey
45	Michigan Tech	19	.4806	CCHA
46	Bemidji State	18	.4784	CCHA
47	Army	16	.4671	AHA
47	Lake Superior State	16	.4651	CCHA
49	Air Force	15	.4651	AHA
50	Rensselaer	14	.4641	ECAC Hockey
51	Niagara	12	.4637	AHA
51	American International	12	.4634	AHA
53	Ferris State	11	.4516	CCHA
54	Lindenwood	9	.4447	Independent
54	St. Lawrence	9	.4320	ECAC Hockey
56	Canisius	8	.4434	AHA
56	Yale	8	.4411	ECAC Hockey
56	Robert Morris	8	.4318	AHA
59	Alaska Anchorage	4	.4280	Independent
59	RIT	4	.4240	AHA
59	Stonehill	4	.4202	Independent
62	Northern Michigan	2	.4095	CCHA
62	Miami	2	.4075	NCHC
64	Mercyhurst	0	.3806	AHA
*A team's RPI has been adjusted to remove negative effect from defeating a weak opponent Note: A team's record is based only on games against other Division I hockey schools which are eligible for the NCAA Tournament; Final

== Player stats ==
=== Scoring leaders ===
Player	Class	Team	GP	G	A	Pts	PIM
Jack Devine	Senior	Denver	44	13	44	57	32
Aidan Thompson	Junior	Denver	44	21	34	55	26
Liam McLinskey	Senior	Holy Cross	40	24	30	54	18
Aiden Fink	Sophomore	Penn State	40	23	30	53	12
Isaac Howard	Junior	Michigan State	37	26	26	52	10
Ayrton Martino	Senior	Clarkson	39	25	26	51	8
Cole O'Hara	Junior	Massachusetts	40	22	29	51	14
Jimmy Snuggerud	Junior	Minnesota	39	22	27	49	29
Quinn Hutson	Sophomore	Boston University	38	23	27	50	33
Ryan Leonard	Sophomore	Boston College	35	29	18	47	44

As of April 12, 2025.

=== Leading goaltenders ===
The following goaltenders lead the NCAA in goals against average, minimum 1/3 of team's minutes played.
GP = Games played; Min = Minutes played; W = Wins; L = Losses; T = Ties; GA = Goals against; SO = Shutouts; SV% = Save percentage; GAA = Goals against average

Player	Class	Team	GP	Min	W	L	T	GA	SO	SV%	GAA
Alex Tracy	Junior	Minnesota State	38	2317:27	26	9	3	55	5	.946	1.42
Jacob Fowler	Sophomore	Boston College	35	2065:45	25	7	2	56	7	.940	1.63
Matej Marinov	Sophomore	Quinnipiac	17	889:19	12	3	0	26	3	.928	1.75
Christian Stoever	Senior	Bowling Green	18	1092:22	12	3	3	32	3	.942	1.76
Albin Boija	Sophomore	Maine	37	2270:12	23	8	6	69	4	.928	1.82
Hampton Slukynsky	Freshman	Western Michigan	25	1578:30	19	5	1	50	1	.922	1.90
Ajeet Gundarah	Freshman	Sacred Heart	26	1578:13	16	7	3	50	3	.936	1.90
Josh Kotai	Sophomore	Augustana	31	1808:58	17	10	3	58	3	.936	1.92
Ty Outen	Junior	Long Island	14	809:35	7	5	1	26	2	.920	1.93
Connor Hasley	Junior	Bentley	34	2027:35	20	12	2	65	11	.925	1.95

As of April 12, 2025.

== Tournament bracket ==
Regional Semifinals; March 27–28
1	Boston College (1)	3
4	Bentley	1
Manchester – SNHU Arena – Fri/Sun
2	Providence	1
3	Denver	5
1	Western Michigan (4)	2**
4	Minnesota State	1
Fargo – Scheels Arena – Thu/Sat
2	Minnesota	4
3	Massachusetts	5*
1	Michigan State (2)	3
4	Cornell	4
Toledo – Huntington Center – Thu/Sat
2	Boston University	8
3	Ohio State	3
1	Maine (3)	1
4	Penn State	5
Allentown – PPL Center – Fri/Sun
2	Connecticut	4
3	Quinnipiac	1

Regional Finals; March 29–30
1	Boston College (1)	1
3	Denver	3
1	Western Michigan (4)	2
3	Massachusetts	1
4	Cornell	2
2	Boston University	3*
4	Penn State	3*
2	Connecticut	2

National Semifinals; April 10
M3	Denver	2
F1	Western Michigan (4)	3**
T2	Boston University	3
A4	Penn State	1

National Championship; April 12
F1	Western Michigan (4)	6
T2	Boston University	2

Number in parentheses denotes overall seed in the tournament
* denotes overtime period(s)

== Awards ==
=== NCAA ===
Award		Recipient
Hobey Baker Award		Isaac Howard, Michigan State
Spencer Penrose Award		Pat Ferschweiler, Western Michigan
Tim Taylor Award		Cole Hutson, Boston University
Mike Richter Award		Jacob Fowler, Boston College
Derek Hines Unsung Hero Award		Jacob Truscott, Michigan
Tournament Most Outstanding Player		Owen Michaels, Western Michigan
AHCA All-American Teams
East First Team	Position	West First Team
Jacob Fowler, Boston College	G	Trey Augustine, Michigan State
Mac Gadowsky, Army	D	Zeev Buium, Denver
Cole Hutson, Boston University	D	Sam Rinzel, Minnesota
Ryan Leonard, Boston College	F	Alex Bump, Western Michigan
Ayrton Martino, Clarkson	F	Jack Devine, Denver
Cole O'Hara, Massachusetts	F	Isaac Howard, Michigan State
East Second Team	Position	West Second Team
Albin Boija, Maine	G	Alex Tracy, Minnesota State
Eamon Powell, Boston College	D	Matt Basgall, Michigan State
Trey Taylor, Clarkson	D	Jake Livanavage, North Dakota
Liam McLinskey, Holy Cross	F	Aiden Fink, Penn State
Joey Muldowney, Connecticut	F	Artem Shlaine, Arizona State
Gabe Perreault, Boston College	F	Jimmy Snuggerud, Minnesota

=== Atlantic Hockey America ===
Award		Recipient
Player of the Year		Liam McLinskey, Holy Cross
Forward of the Year		Liam McLinskey, Holy Cross
Best Defenseman		Mac Gadowsky, Army
Goaltender of the Year		Thomas Gale, Holy Cross
Best Defensive Forward		Austin Schwartz, Air Force
Best Defensive Forward		Ethan Leyh, Bentley
Rookie of the Year		Trevor Hoskin, Niagara
Individual Sportsmanship Award		Mac Gadowsky, Army
Coach of the Year		Bill Riga, Holy Cross
Tournament Most Outstanding Player		Connor Hasley, Bentley
All-Atlantic Hockey America Teams
First Team	Position	Second Team
Thomas Gale, Holy Cross	G	Connor Hasley, Bentley
Nick Bochen, Bentley	D	Mikey Adamson, Sacred Heart
Mac Gadowsky, Army	D	Mack Oliphant, Holy Cross
Ethan Leyh, Bentley	F	Matteo Giampa, Canisius
Liam McLinskey, Holy Cross	F	Trevor Hoskin, Niagra
Matthew Wilde, RIT	F	Félix Trudeau, Sacred Heart
Third Team	Position	Rookie Team
Ajeet Gundarah, Sacred Heart	G	Ajeet Gundarah, Sacred Heart
Hunter Sansbury, Sacred Heart	D	Dominic Elliott, Robert Morris
Evan Stella, American International	D	Dominic Payne, Canisius
Jay Ahearn, Niagra	F	Trevor Hoskin, Niagra
Tyler Fukakusa, RIT	F	Jack Ivey, Army
Devin Phillips, Holy Cross	F	Matt Kursonis, Holy Cross

=== Big Ten ===
Award		Recipient
Player of the Year		Isaac Howard, Michigan State
Defensive Player of the Year		Sam Rinzel, Minnesota
Goaltender of the Year		Trey Augustine, Michigan State
Freshman of the Year		Michael Hage, Michigan
Scoring Champion		Isaac Howard, Michigan State
Coach of the Year		Steve Rohlik, Ohio State
Tournament Most Outstanding Player		Isaac Howard, Michigan State
All-Big Ten Teams
First Team	Position	Second Team
Trey Augustine, Michigan State	G	Arsenii Sergeev, Penn State
Matt Basgall, Michigan State	D	Ethan Edwards, Michigan
Sam Rinzel, Minnesota	D	Simon Mack, Penn State
Aiden Fink, Penn State	F	Quinn Finley, Wisconsin
Isaac Howard, Michigan State	F	T. J. Hughes, Michigan
Jimmy Snuggerud, Minnesota	F	Cole Knuble, Notre Dame
Freshman Team	Position	
Cameron Korpi, Michigan	G	
Cade Christenson, Penn State	D	
Logan Hensler, Wisconsin	D	
Charlie Cerrato, Penn State	F	
Michael Hage, Michigan	F	
Gavin Morrissey, Wisconsin	F	

=== CCHA ===
Award		Recipient
Player of the Year		Alex Tracy, Minnesota State
Forward of the Year		Rhett Pitlick, Minnesota State
Defenseman of the Year		Evan Murr, Minnesota State
Goaltender of the Year		Alex Tracy, Minnesota State
Rookie of the Year		Elias Jansson, Michigan Tech
Best Defensive Defenseman		Chase Pietila, Michigan Tech
Best Defensive Forward		Jackson Jutting, Bemidji State
Coach of the Year		Luke Strand, Minnesota State
Tournament Most Valuable Player		Evan Murr, Minnesota State
All-CCHA Teams
First Team	Position	Second Team
Alex Tracy, Minnesota State	G	Josh Kotai, Augustana
Evan Murr, Minnesota State	D	Travis Shoudy, Ferris State
Chase Pietila, Michigan Tech	D	Chase Foley, St. Thomas
Liam Malmquist, St. Thomas	F	Luke Mobley, Augustana
Rhett Pitlick, Minnesota State	F	Ryan O'Hara, Bowling Green
Lucas Wahlin, St. Thomas	F	Brody Waters, Bowling Green
Rookie Team	Position	
Rorke Applebee, Lake Superior State	G	
Rylan Brown, Michigan Tech	D	
Isa Parekh, Bemidji State	D	
Jakub Altrichter, Northern Michigan	F	
Elias Jansson, Michigan Tech	F	
Logan Morrell, Michigan Tech	F	

=== ECAC Hockey ===
Award		Recipient
Player of the Year		Ayrton Martino, Clarkson
Best Defensive Forward		Jack Ricketts, Quinnipiac
Best Defensive Defenseman		Trey Taylor, Clarkson
Rookie of the Year		Michael Neumeier, Colgate
Ken Dryden Award		Ethan Langenegger, Clarkson
Student-Athlete of the Year		Mason Waite, St. Lawrence
Tim Taylor Award		Jean-François Houle, Clarkson
Most Outstanding Player in Tournament		Ian Shane, Cornell
All-ECAC Hockey Teams
First Team	Position	Second Team
Ethan Langenegger, Clarkson	G	Lawton Zacher, Brown
CJ Foley, Dartmouth	D	Tommy Bergsland, Colgate
Trey Taylor, Clarkson	D	Tristan Sarsland, Clarkson
Brett Chorske, Colgate	F	Dalton Bancroft, Clarkson
Ayrton Martino, Clarkson	F	Mason Marcellus, Quinnipiac
Ellis Rickwood, Clarkson	F	Jack Ricketts, Quinnipiac
Third Team	Position	Rookie Team
Kyle Chauvette, Union	G	Ben Charette, Harvard
John Prokop, Union	D	Michael Neumeier, Colgate
Tim Rego, Cornell	D	Tate Taylor, Clarkson
Brandon Buhr, Union	F	Ben Muthersbaugh, Union
Brendan Gorman, Princeton	F	Brian Nicholas, Brown
Tyler Kopff, Brown	F	Mick Thompson, Harvard

=== Hockey East ===
Award		Recipient
Player of the Year		Ryan Leonard, Boston College
Best Defensive Forward		Hudson Schandor, Connecticut
Best Defensive Defenseman		Eamon Powell, Boston College
Rookie of the Year		Cole Hutson, Boston University
Goaltending Champion		Jacob Fowler, Boston College
Len Ceglarski Award		Hudson Schandor, Connecticut
Three Stars Award		Ryan Leonard, Boston College
Scoring Champion		Ryan Leonard, Boston College
Charlie Holt Team Sportsmanship Award		Massachusetts
Bob Kullen Award (Coach of the Year)		Mike Cavanaugh, Connecticut
William Flynn Tournament Most Valuable Player		Albin Boija, Maine
All-Hockey East Teams
First Team	Position	Second Team
Jacob Fowler, Boston College	G	Albin Boija, Maine
Cole Hutson, Boston University	D	Guillaume Richard, Providence
Eamon Powell, Boston College	D	Tom Willander, Boston University
Ryan Leonard, Boston College	F	Quinn Hutson, Boston University
Cole O'Hara, Massachusetts	F	Joey Muldowney, Connecticut
Gabe Perreault, Boston College	F	Hudson Schandor, Connecticut
Third Team	Position	Rookie Team
Michael Hrabal, Massachusetts	G	Callum Tung, Connecticut
Alex Gagne, New Hampshire	D	Cole Hutson, Boston University
Brandon Holt, Maine	D	Francesco Dell'Elce, Massachusetts
Ryan Greene, Boston University	F	James Hagens, Boston College
Cameron Lund, Northeastern	F	Teddy Stiga, Boston College
Jake Richard, Connecticut	F	Cole Eiserman, Boston University
	F	Colin Kessler, Vermont

=== NCHC ===
Award		Recipient
Player of the Year		Zeev Buium, Denver
Forward of the Year		Alex Bump, Western Michigan
Goaltender of the Year		Šimon Latkoczy, Omaha
Rookie of the Year		Sacha Boisvert, North Dakota
Defensive Defenseman of the Year		Ty Murchison, Arizona State
Offensive Defenseman of the Year		Zeev Buium, Denver
Defensive Forward of the Year		Tim Washe, Western Michigan
Scholar-Athlete of the Year		Matt Davis, Denver
Three Stars Award		Artem Shlaine, Arizona State
Sportsmanship Award		Joe Molenaar, Minnesota Duluth
Herb Brooks Coach of the Year		Pat Ferschweiler, Western Michigan
Frozen Faceoff MVP		Alex Bump, Western Michigan
All-NCHC Teams
First Team	Position	Second Team
Šimon Latkoczy, Omaha	G	Hampton Slukynsky, Western Michigan
Zeev Buium, Denver	D	Noah Beck, Arizona State
Jake Livanavage, North Dakota	D	Max Burkholder, Colorado College
Alex Bump, Western Michigan	F	Lukas Sillinger, Arizona State
Jack Devine, Denver	F	Luke Grainger, Western Michigan
Artem Shlaine, Arizona State	F	Sam Stange, Omaha
	F	Aidan Thompson, Denver
Third Team	Position	Rookie Team
Cameron Rowe, Western Michigan	G	Hampton Slukynsky, Western Michigan
Eric Pohlkamp, Denver	D	Colin Ralph, St. Cloud State
Joona Väisänen, Western Michigan	D	Joona Väisänen, Western Michigan
Sam Harris, Denver	F	Sacha Boisvert, North Dakota
Carter King, Denver	F	Austin Burnevik, St. Cloud State
Ryan Kirwan, Arizona State	F	Max Plante, Minnesota Duluth
	F	Cullen Potter, Arizona State

=== HCA ===
Month	Award	Recipient
October	Player of the Month	Jack Devine, Denver
October	Rookie of the Month	Ben Muthersbaugh, Union
October	Goaltender of the Month	Josh Kotai, Augustana
October	Goaltender of the Month	Owen Say, Notre Dame
November	Player of the Month	Ryan Leonard, Boston College
November	Rookie of the Month	Michael Hage, Michigan
November	Goaltender of the Month	Kaidan Mbereko, Colorado College
November	Goaltender of the Month	Alex Tracy, Minnesota State
December	Player of the Month	Tanner Klimpke, Robert Morris
December	Rookie of the Month	Logan Morrell, Michigan Tech
December	Rookie of the Month	Max Strand, Vermont
December	Goaltender of the Month	Kristoffer Eberly, Ohio State
January	Player of the Month	Mac Gadowsky, Army
January	Player of the Month	Ryan Kirwan, Arizona State
January	Player of the Month	Jimmy Snuggerud, Minnesota
January	Rookie of the Month	Ryan Manzella, Michigan Tech
January	Goaltender of the Month	Josh Kotai, Augustana
January	Goaltender of the Month	Tyler Muszelik, Connecticut
February	Player of the Month	Ayrton Martino, Clarkson
February	Rookie of the Month	Mick Thompson, Harvard
February	Rookie of the Month	Cole Hutson, Boston University
February	Goaltender of the Month	Alex Tracy, Minnesota State
March/April	Player of the Month	Tim Washe, Western Michigan
March/April	Rookie of the Month	Cole Hutson, Boston University
March/April	Goaltender of the Month	Matt Davis, Denver
March/April	Goaltender of the Month	Connor Hasley, Bentley
March/April	Goaltender of the Month	Alex Tracy, Minnesota State

== 2025 NHL entry draft ==
Round	Pick	Player	College	Conference	NHL team
1	6	Porter Martone ^{†}	Michigan State	Big Ten	Philadelphia Flyers
1	7	James Hagens	Boston College	Hockey East	Boston Bruins
1	10	Roger McQueen ^{†}	Providence	Hockey East	Anaheim Ducks
1	14	Jackson Smith ^{†}	Penn State	Big Ten	Columbus Blue Jackets
1	18	Cole Reschny ^{†}	North Dakota	NCHC	Calgary Flames
1	23	Logan Hensler	Wisconsin	Big Ten	Ottawa Senators
1	24	Will Horcoff	Michigan	Big Ten	Pittsburgh Penguins
1	25	Václav Nestrašil ^{†}	Massachusetts	Hockey East	Chicago Blackhawks
1	26	Ryker Lee ^{†}	Michigan State	Big Ten	Nashville Predators
1	28	Sascha Boumedienne	Boston University	Hockey East	Winnipeg Jets
1	29	Mason West ^{†}	Michigan State	Big Ten	Chicago Blackhawks
1	32	Cullen Potter	Arizona State	NCHC	Calgary Flames
2	35	Jacob Rombach ^{†}	Minnesota	Big Ten	Nashville Predators
2	38	Carter Amico ^{†}	Boston University	Hockey East	Philadelphia Flyers
2	40	Jack Murtagh ^{†}	Boston University	Hockey East	Philadelphia Flyers
2	43	Malcolm Spence ^{†}	Michigan	Big Ten	New York Rangers
2	45	Eric Nilson ^{†}	Michigan State	Big Ten	Anaheim Ducks
2	48	Shane Vansaghi	Michigan State	Big Ten	Philadelphia Flyers
2	49	Charlie Cerrato	Penn State	Big Ten	Carolina Hurricanes
2	50	Conrad Fondrk ^{†}	Boston University	Hockey East	New Jersey Devils
2	51	William Moore ^{†}	Boston College	Hockey East	Boston Bruins
2	53	Cole McKinney ^{†}	Michigan	Big Ten	San Jose Sharks
2	58	Jack Ivankovic ^{†}	Michigan	Big Ten	Nashville Predators
2	63	Ben Kevan ^{†}	Arizona State	NCHC	New Jersey Devils
3	65	Kieren Dervin ^{†}	Boston College	Hockey East	Vancouver Canucks
3	70	Sean Barnhill ^{†}	Michigan State	Big Ten	New York Rangers
3	73	Charlton Trethewey ^{†}	Boston University	Hockey East	Pittsburgh Penguins
3	76	Malte Vass ^{†}	Boston University	Hockey East	Columbus Blue Jackets
3	77	Francesco Dell'elce	Massachusetts	Hockey East	Colorado Avalanche
3	79	Cooper Simpson ^{†}	North Dakota	NCHC	Boston Bruins
3	80	Mace'o Phillips ^{†}	Minnesota	Big Ten	Calgary Flames
3	82	Arseni Radkov ^{†}	Massachusetts	Hockey East	Montreal Canadiens
3	88	Kristian Epperson ^{†}	Denver	NCHC	Los Angeles Kings
3	90	Mason Moe ^{†}	Minnesota	Big Ten	New Jersey Devils
3	91	Brady Peddle ^{†}	Michigan State	Big Ten	Pittsburgh Penguins
3	95	Teddy Mutryn ^{†}	Boston College	Hockey East	San Jose Sharks
4	99	Trenten Bennett ^{†}	St. Lawrence	ECAC Hockey	New Jersey Devils
4	101	Drew Schock ^{†}	Michigan	Big Ten	Anaheim Ducks
4	109	Brent Solomon ^{†}	Wisconsin	Big Ten	Detroit Red Wings
4	113	L. J. Mooney ^{†}	Minnesota	Big Ten	Montreal Canadiens
4	120	Caeden Herrington ^{†}	Vermont	Hockey East	Los Angeles Kings
4	122	Alex Huang ^{†}	Harvard	ECAC Hockey	Nashville Predators
4	124	Zack Sharp	Western Michigan	NCHC	San Jose Sharks
4	125	Jimmy Lombardi ^{†}	Michigan	Big Ten	Los Angeles Kings
4	128	Shea Busch ^{†}	Penn State	Big Ten	Florida Panthers
5	130	Ryan Miller ^{†}	Denver	NCHC	Pittsburgh Penguins
5	131	Asher Barnett ^{†}	Michigan	Big Ten	Edmonton Oilers
5	137	William Belle ^{†}	Notre Dame	Big Ten	Toronto Maple Leafs
5	138	Sam Laurila ^{†}	North Dakota	NCHC	New York Islanders
5	141	Justin Kipkie ^{†}	Arizona State	NCHC	Minnesota Wild
5	143	Wilson Bjorck ^{†}	Colorado College	NCHC	Vancouver Canucks
5	144	Ethan Wyttenbach ^{†}	Quinnipiac	ECAC Hockey	Calgary Flames
5	145	Alexis Cournoyer ^{†}	Cornell	ECAC Hockey	Montreal Canadiens
5	150	Max Heise ^{†}	Michigan State	Big Ten	San Jose Sharks
5	151	Everett Baldwin ^{†}	Providence	Hockey East	Tampa Bay Lightning
5	154	Jordan Charron ^{†}	St. Lawrence	ECAC Hockey	Pittsburgh Penguins
5	155	Jackson Crowder ^{†}	Ohio State	Big Ten	Washington Capitals
6	164	Nathan Quinn ^{†}	Northeastern	Hockey East	Philadelphia Flyers
6	167	Ashton Schultz ^{†}	North Dakota	NCHC	Buffalo Sabres
6	168	Anthony Allain-Samake ^{†}	Connecticut	Hockey East	Anaheim Ducks
6	169	Carter Sanderson ^{†}	North Dakota	NCHC	Pittsburgh Penguins
6	176	Aidan Lane ^{†}	Harvard	ECAC Hockey	Calgary Flames
6	181	Bruno Idžan ^{†}	Wisconsin	Big Ten	Ottawa Senators
7	193	Caleb Heil ^{†}	North Dakota	NCHC	Tampa Bay Lightning
7	196	Brendan McMorrow ^{†}	Denver	NCHC	Los Angeles Kings
7	197	Brendan Dunphy ^{†}	Connecticut	Hockey East	Florida Panthers
7	198	Jeremy Loranger ^{†}	Omaha	NCHC	Columbus Blue Jackets
7	201	Kale Dach ^{†}	Penn State	Big Ten	Pittsburgh Penguins
7	202	Jacob Kvasnicka ^{†}	Minnesota	Big Ten	New York Islanders
7	204	Grayden Robertson-Palmer ^{†}	Dartmouth	ECAC Hockey	Detroit Red Wings
7	207	Matthew Lansing ^{†}	Quinnipiac	ECAC Hockey	Vancouver Canucks
7	209	Maxon Vig ^{†}	Bemidji State	CCHA	Montreal Canadiens
7	210	Richard Gallant ^{†}	Harvard	ECAC Hockey	San Jose Sharks
7	214	Nolan Roed ^{†}	St. Cloud State	NCHC	Colorado Avalanche
7	219	Ryan Rucinski ^{†}	Ohio State	Big Ten	Buffalo Sabres
7	223	Aidan Park ^{†}	Michigan	Big Ten	Edmonton Oilers

† incoming freshman

== See also ==
- 2024–25 NCAA Division I women's ice hockey season
- 2024–25 NCAA Division II men's ice hockey season
- 2024–25 NCAA Division III men's ice hockey season
