= Jean-François Houle =

Canadian ice hockey player (born 1975)

- Born: January 14, 1975 (age 51) Charlesbourg, Quebec, Canada
- Height: 5 ft 9 in (175 cm)
- Weight: 190 lb (86 kg; 13 st 8 lb)
- Position: Left wing
- Shot: Right
- Played for: AHL; Fredericton Canadiens; Cincinnati Mighty Ducks; ECHL; New Orleans Brass; Tallahassee Tiger Sharks
- NHL draft: 99th overall, 1993; Montreal Canadiens
- Playing career: 1997–2002 Coaching career

Current position
- Title: Head coach
- Team: Clarkson
- Conference: ECAC Hockey
- Record: 35–24–4 (.587)

Biographical details
- Education: Clarkson University

Coaching career (HC unless noted)
- 2003–2010: Clarkson (asst.)
- 2010–2011: Lewiston MAINEiacs
- 2011–2014: Blainville-Boisbriand Armada
- 2014–2021: Bakersfield Condors (asst.)
- 2021–2024: Laval Rocket
- 2024–present: Clarkson

Head coaching record
- Overall: 35–24–4 (.587)

Accomplishments and honors

Awards
- Tim Taylor Award (2025)

Jean-François Houle (born January 14, 1975) is a Canadian former ice hockey player and current professional coach. He is presently the head coach of the Clarkson Golden Knights, a team competing in the ECAC Hockey conference of the National Collegiate Athletic Association (NCAA).

== Collegiate career ==
Houle was selected 99th overall in by the Montreal Canadiens in the 1993 NHL entry draft. He attended Clarkson University, where he competed at the NCAA Division I level as a member of the Clarkson Golden Knights men's ice hockey team.

== Coaching career ==
In 2002, after concluding a five-year professional playing career, Houle returned to the Clarkson Golden Knights to serve as an assistant coach. In 2010, he became the head coach of the Lewiston MAINEiacs in the Quebec Major Junior Hockey League (QMJHL), and the following season, he took on the same role with the Blainville-Boisbriand Armada.

Houle served as the head coach of the Bakersfield Condors in their final season in the ECHL. Following that, he was hired by the Edmonton Oilers as an assistant coach for their relocated AHL affiliate, which became the Bakersfield Condors in 2015. He held that position until 2021, when he transitioned to the Laval Rocket.

== Personal life ==
Houle is the son of Réjean Houle, a notable figure in hockey who spent many years as a forward with the Montreal Canadiens before transitioning into a leadership role as the team's general manager.

== Career statistics ==
=== Regular season and playoffs ===
			Regular season					Playoffs
Season	Team	League	GP	G	A	Pts	PIM	GP	G	A	Pts	PIM
1993–94	Clarkson University	ECAC	34	6	19	25	20	—	—	—	—	—
1994–95	Clarkson University	ECAC	34	8	11	19	42	—	—	—	—	—
1995–96	Clarkson University	ECAC	38	14	14	28	46	—	—	—	—	—
1996–97	Clarkson University	ECAC	37	21	37	58	40	—	—	—	—	—
1997–98	New Orleans Brass	ECHL	53	25	37	62	119	4	1	1	2	16
1997–98	Fredericton Canadiens	AHL	7	1	0	1	8	—	—	—	—	—
1998–99	Fredericton Canadiens	AHL	62	7	22	29	101	12	1	7	8	10
1999–00	Cincinnati Mighty Ducks	AHL	3	0	0	0	2	—	—	—	—	—
1999–00	Tallahassee Tiger Sharks	ECHL	55	18	30	48	71	—	—	—	—	—
2000–01	Tallahassee Tiger Sharks	ECHL	56	12	34	46	92	—	—	—	—	—
2001–02	New Orleans Brass	ECHL	52	21	25	46	106	1	0	0	0	0
AHL totals			72	8	22	30	111	12	1	7	8	10
ECHL totals			216	76	126	202	388	5	1	1	2	16
NCAA totals			143	49	81	130	148	—	—	—	—	—

== Head coaching record ==
Record table
Season	Team	Overall	Conference	Standing	Postseason
Clarkson Golden Knights (ECAC Hockey) (2024–present)
2024–25	Clarkson	24–12–3	15–6–1	2nd	ECAC Runner-up
2025–26	Clarkson	18-17-3	9-10-3	8th	ECAC Semifinalist
Clarkson:		35–24–4	20–12–2		
Total:		53–41–7			
National champion Postseason invitational champion Conference regular season champion Conference regular season and conference tournament champion Division regular season champion Division regular season and conference tournament champion Conference tournament champion

== Awards and honours ==
Award	Year	Ref
College
All-ECAC Hockey Rookie Team	1994	
ECAC Hockey All-Tournament Team	1997	
QMJHL
Ron Lapointe Trophy - QMJHL Coach of the Year	2012	

Awards and achievements
Preceded by Reid Cashman	Tim Taylor Award; 2024–25	Succeeded by Incumbent
