= ECAC Hockey Student-Athlete of the Year =

- Sport: Ice hockey
- Awarded for: The top Scholar-Athlete in ECAC Hockey

History
- First award: 2007
- Most recent: David Chen

The ECAC Hockey Student-Athlete of the Year is an annual award given out at the conclusion of the ECAC Hockey regular season to the top scholar-athlete in the conference as voted by the coaches of each ECAC team. Each team nominates a candidate based upon their academic and athletic achievements who then become eligible for the conference award.

The Student-Athlete of the Year was first awarded in 2007 and every year thereafter.

== Award winners ==
Year	Winner	Position	School
2006–07	Olivier Bouchard	Left wing	Union
2007–08	Landis Stankievech	Center	Princeton
2008–09	Matt Cook	Center	Union
2009–10	Colin Greening	Left wing	Cornell
2010–11	Stéphane Boileau	Forward	Union
2011–12	Keir Ross	Defenceman	Cornell
2012–13	Matt Zarbo	Center	Clarkson
2013–14	Andy Iles	Goaltender	Cornell
2014–15	Kyle Criscuolo	Center	Harvard
2015–16	Kyle Criscuolo	Center	Harvard
2016–17	Derek Smith	Defenceman	Quinnipiac
2017–18	Bo Pieper	Forward	Quinnipiac
2018–19	Devin Brosseau	Forward	Clarkson
2019–20	Zach Tsekos	Center	Clarkson
2020–21	Kyle Betts	Center	Cornell
2021–22	Josh Kosack	Forward	Union
2022–23	Matt Verboon	Forward	Colgate
2023–24	Gabriel Seger	Center	Cornell
2024–25	Mason Waite	Defenceman	St. Lawrence
2025–26	David Chen	Forward	Yale

=== Winners by school ===
School	Winners
Cornell	5
Union	4
Clarkson	3
Harvard	2
Quinnipiac	2
Colgate	1
Princeton	1
St. Lawrence	1
Yale	1

=== Winners by position ===
Position	Winners
Center	8
Right wing	0
Left wing	2
Forward	6
Defenceman	3
Goaltender	1

== See also ==
- ECAC Hockey Awards
