= Ayrton Martino =

Canadian ice hockey player (born 2002)

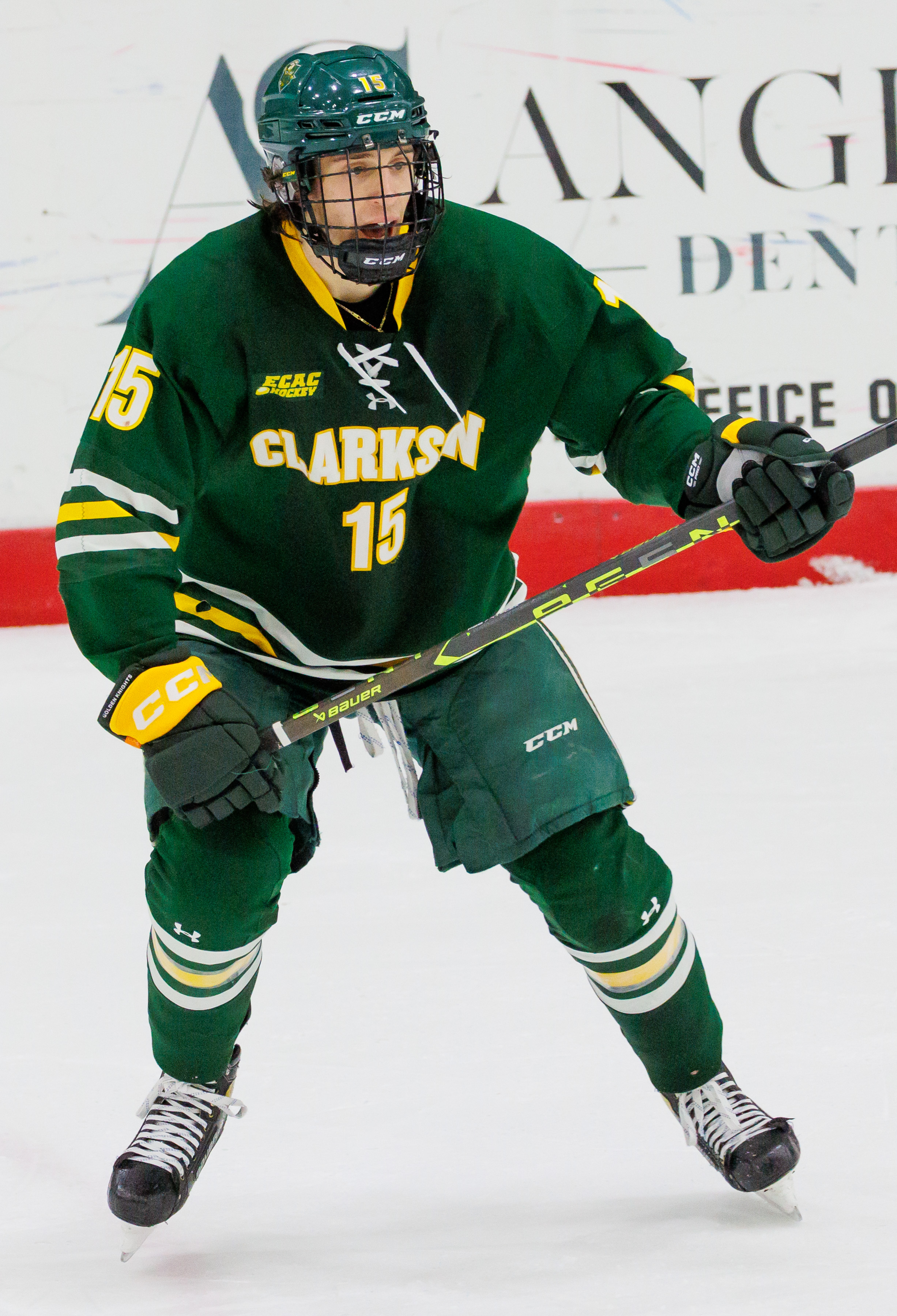
- Martino with the Clarkson Golden Knights in 2023
- Born: September 28, 2002 (age 23) Toronto, Ontario, Canada
- Height: 5 ft 11 in (180 cm)
- Weight: 186 lb (84 kg; 13 st 4 lb)
- Position: Left wing
- Shoots: Left
- NHL team (P) Cur. team: Dallas Stars; Texas Stars (AHL)
- NHL draft: 73rd overall, 2021; Dallas Stars
- Playing career: 2025–present

Ayrton Martino (born September 28, 2002) is a Canadian professional ice hockey player for the Texas Stars of the American Hockey League (AHL), while under contract to the Dallas Stars of the National Hockey League (NHL). He played college ice hockey at Clarkson.

== Playing career ==
=== College ===
Martino began his collegiate career for Clarkson during the 2021–22 season. During his freshman year he recorded seven goals and 21 assists in 37 games. Following the season he was named to the All-ECAC Rookie Team and a finalist for the ECAC Hockey Rookie of the Year. During the 2022–23 season, in his sophomore year, he recorded nine goals and 29 assists in 37 games. He led the team in assists and points (38). Following the season he was named to the All-ECAC Third Team. During the 2023–24 season, in his junior year, he recorded nine goals and 18 assists in 31 games. He again led the team in assists.

During the 2024–25 season, in his senior year, he recorded a career-high 25 goals and 26 assists in 39 games. His 51 points finished tied for fourth in the NCAA. He recorded his first career hat-trick on January 17, 2025, in a game against Yale. During conference play he recorded 21 goals and 17 assists in 22 games. He led the ECAC in goals, points (38), and points-per-game (1.73). Following the season he was named to the All-ECAC First Team and ECAC Hockey Player of the Year. He was also named a top-ten finalist for the Hobey Baker Award. He finished his collegiate career with 50 goals and 95 assists in 144 games.

=== Professional ===
On March 24, 2025, Martino signed a two-year, entry-level contract with the Dallas Stars of the NHL, beginning during the 2025–26 season. He was assigned to the Stars' AHL affiliate, the Texas Stars, for the remainder of the 2024–25 season.

== Career statistics ==
			Regular season					Playoffs
Season	Team	League	GP	G	A	Pts	PIM	GP	G	A	Pts	PIM
2018–19	St. Michael's Buzzers	OJHL	49	10	32	42	26	11	2	8	10	0
2019–20	St. Michael's Buzzers	OJHL	48	29	50	79	19	4	2	4	6	0
2020–21	Omaha Lancers	USHL	38	18	38	56	12	2	0	0	0	0
2021–22	Clarkson University	ECAC	37	7	21	28	8	—	—	—	—	—
2022–23	Clarkson University	ECAC	37	9	29	38	30	—	—	—	—	—
2023–24	Clarkson University	ECAC	31	9	18	27	8	—	—	—	—	—
2024–25	Clarkson University	ECAC	39	25	26	51	8	—	—	—	—	—
2024–25	Texas Stars	AHL	4	0	0	0	2	—	—	—	—	—
2025–26	Texas Stars	AHL	41	2	10	12	4	—	—	—	—	—
2025–26	Idaho Steelheads	ECHL	3	2	2	4	0	—	—	—	—	—
AHL totals			45	2	10	12	6	—	—	—	—	—

== Awards and honours ==
Award	Year
College
All-ECAC Rookie Team	2022
All-ECAC Third Team	2023
All-ECAC First Team	2025
ECAC Hockey Player of the Year	2025
AHCA East First Team All-American	2025

Awards and achievements
Preceded by Collin Graf	ECAC Hockey Player of the Year; 2024–25	Succeeded by Hayden Stavroff
