= Adirondack Winter Invitational =

U.S. college ice hockey tournament

Tournament information
- Sport: College ice hockey
- Location: Lake Placid, New York
- Format: Single-elimination
- Venue: Herb Brooks Arena
- Teams: 4

The Adirondack Winter Invitational is a mid-season college ice hockey tournament with the first iteration played in late December 2023.

== History ==
The inaugural tournament was announced for the 2023–24 season with a field consisting of Arizona State, Clarkson, Cornell and Massachusetts.

== Yearly Results ==
Year	Champion	Runner-up	Third place	Fourth place	Ref
2023	Arizona State	Cornell	Clarkson	Massachusetts	
2024	Massachusetts Lowell	Providence	Clarkson	St. Lawrence	
2025	Alaska	Clarkson	Massachusetts Lowell	St. Lawrence	
