= 2024–25 NCAA Division I men's ice hockey rankings =

- NCAA tournament: 2025
- NCAA champion: Western Michigan
- Preseason No. 1 (USCHO): Denver
- Preseason No. 1 (USA Hockey): Denver
- NCAA Division I men's ice hockey rankings

Two human polls made up the 2024–25 NCAA Division I men's ice hockey rankings, the USCHO.com/CBS College Sports poll and the USA Hockey/The Rink Live poll. As the 2024–25 season progressed, rankings were updated weekly.

== Legend ==
	Increase in ranking
	Decrease in ranking
	Not ranked previous week
Italics	Number of first place votes
(#-#)	Win–loss–tie record
т	Tied with team above or below also with this symbol

== USCHO ==
	Preseason Sep 23	Week 1 Oct 7	Week 2 Oct 14	Week 3 Oct 21	Week 4 Oct 28	Week 5 Nov 4	Week 6 Nov 11	Week 7 Nov 18	Week 8 Nov 25	Week 9 Dec 2	Week 10 Dec 9	Week 11 Dec 16	Week 13 Dec 30	Week 14 Jan 6	Week 15 Jan 13	Week 16 Jan 20	Week 17 Jan 27	Week 18 Feb 3	Week 19 Feb 10	Week 20 Feb 17	Week 21 Feb 24	Week 22 Mar 3	Week 23 Mar 10	Week 24 Mar 17	Week 25 Mar 24	Final Apr 14	
1.	Denver (42)	Denver (2–0–0) (43)	Denver (2–0–0) (47)	Denver (4–0–0) (48)	Denver (6–0–0) (48)	Denver (8–0–0) (48)	Denver (10–0–0) (48)	Denver (12–0–0) (50)	Michigan State (9–1–0) (38)	Michigan State (11–1–0) (43)	Minnesota (15–2–1) (38)	Michigan State (13–2–1) (31)	Michigan State (14–2–1) (41)	Michigan State (17–2–1) (43)	Michigan State (18–2–2) (48)	Boston College (16–4–1) (36)	Boston College (18–4–1) (42)	Boston College (19–4–1) (48)	Boston College (21–4–1) (50)	Michigan State (22–5–3) (23)	Boston College (24–6–1) (43)	Boston College (25–6–2) (42)	Boston College (26–6–2) (48)	Michigan State (25–6–4) (33)	Michigan State (26–6–4) (32)	Western Michigan (34-7-1) (50)	1.
2.	Boston College (6)	Boston College (0–0–0) (6)	Boston College (1–1–0) (2)	Boston College (2–1–0)	Boston College (3–1–0)	Boston College (5–1–0)	Boston College (7–1–0) (2)	Michigan State (9–1–0)	Denver (12–2–0) (7)	Denver (12–2–0) (4)	Boston College (11–3–1) (6)	Boston College (12–3–1) (15)	Boston College (12–3–1) (8)	Boston College (12–3–1) (6)	Boston College (13–4–1)	Michigan State (19–3–2) (13)	Michigan State (20–3–3) (7)	Michigan State (21–4–3) (2)	Michigan State (22–5–3)	Boston College (22–6–1) (11)	Minnesota (23–7–4) (6)	Michigan State (24–6–4) (6)	Michigan State (24–6–4) (2)	Boston College (26–7–2) (12)	Boston College (26–7–2) (13)	Boston University (24-14-2)	2.
3.	Boston University	Boston University (1–0–0)	Boston University (2–0–0)	Boston University (3–0–0)	Michigan State (5–1–0)	Minnesota (7–1–0) (1)	Minnesota (9–1–0)	Boston College (7–2–0)	Minnesota (12–2–0) (3)	Boston College (10–3–0) (2)	Michigan State (12–2–0) (4)	Minnesota (15–3–2) (3)	Minnesota (15–3–2)	Minnesota (17–3–2) (1)	Minnesota (18–4–2)	Western Michigan (15–4–1)	Western Michigan (17–4–1) (1)	Minnesota (21–6–3)	Western Michigan (20–5–1)	Western Michigan (22–5–1) (16)	Michigan State (22–6–4)	Minnesota (24–8–4) (1)	Western Michigan (26–7–1)	Western Michigan (28–7–1) (5)	Western Michigan (30–7–1) (5)	Denver (31-12-1)	3.
4.	Michigan State	Michigan State (2–0–0)	Michigan State (3–1–0)	Michigan State (3–1–0)	Minnesota (5–1–0) (1)	Michigan State (5–1–0)	Michigan State (7–1–0)	Minnesota (10–2–0)	Boston College (9–3–0) (2)	Minnesota (13–2–1) (1)	Denver (13–3–0)	Maine (12–2–2) (1)	Western Michigan (11–3–1)	Western Michigan (13–4–1)	Western Michigan (13–4–1)	Minnesota (19–5–2) (1)	Minnesota (19–6–3)	Western Michigan (18–5–1)	Minnesota (21–6–3)	Maine (19–5–5)	Western Michigan (23–6–1) (1)	Western Michigan (24–7–1) (1)	Maine (21–7–6)	Maine (22–7–6)	Maine (24–7–6)	Boston College (27-8-2)	4.
5.	North Dakota	Minnesota (0–0–0)	North Dakota (1–0–0)	Minnesota (3–1–0) (1)	Boston University (4–1–0)	Maine (6–0–1)	Michigan (7–2–1)	Maine (7–2–2)т	Maine (8–2–2)	Maine (10–2–2)	Maine (12–2–2) (2)	Denver (14–4–0)	Providence (14–3–2)	Providence (14–3–2)	Maine (15–4–2)	Denver (17–5–0)	Denver (18–6–0)	Maine (17–5–3)	Maine (18–5–4)	Minnesota (21–7–4)	Maine (19–6–5)	Maine (21–6–5)	Minnesota (25–10–4)	Minnesota (25–10–4)	Minnesota (25–10–4)	Penn State (24-14-4)	5.
6.	Minnesota	North Dakota (0–0–0)	Minnesota (1–1–0)	Maine (3–0–0)	North Dakota (3–2–0)	Cornell (2–0–0) (1)	Cornell (3–0–1)	Michigan (7–2–1)т	Michigan (9–2–1)	Michigan (10–3–1)	Western Michigan (10–3–1)	Western Michigan (10–3–1)	Denver (14–4–0) (1)	Denver (15–5–0)	Providence (15–3–2) (1)	Maine (15–5–3)	Maine (15–5–3)	Denver (19–6–1)	Denver (20–7–1)	Denver (21–8–1)	Denver (23–8–1)	Providence (20–8–5)	Denver (26–9–1)	Denver (28–10–1)	Denver (29–11–1)	Michigan State (26-7-4)	6.
7.	Michigan	Cornell (0–0–0) (1)	Quinnipiac (1–0–0)	North Dakota (2–1–0)	Maine (4–0–1)	Michigan (5–2–1)	Maine (6–2–1)	Colorado College (8–1–1)	Western Michigan (8–1–1)	Western Michigan (9–2–1)	Providence (12–3–2)	Providence (12–3–2)	Maine (12–3–2)	Maine (13–4–2)	Denver (17–5–0) (1)	Providence (15–5–2)	Providence (15–6–3)	Providence (16–6–4)	Providence (16–7–5)	Ohio State (20–8–2)	Providence (18–8–5)	Denver (24–9–1)	Providence (21–9–5)	Connecticut (21–10–4)	Connecticut (22–11–4)	Connecticut (23-12-4)	7.
8.	Quinnipiac	Quinnipiac (0–0–0)	Cornell (0–0–0) (1)	Cornell (0–0–0) (1)	Colorado College (4–0–0)	Colorado College (6–0–0)	Colorado College (8–0–0)	Cornell (3–1–2)	Colorado College (9–2–1)	Colorado College (9–2–1)	Michigan (10–5–1)	Colorado College (10–5–1)	Colorado College (10–5–1)	UMass Lowell (12–4–2)	Ohio State (15–6–1)	Boston University (13–7–1)	UMass Lowell (13–7–3)	Boston University (14–9–1)	Ohio State (18–8–2)	Providence (17–8–5)	Ohio State (20–10–2)	Connecticut (19–10–4)	Connecticut (20–10–4)	Boston University (21–12–2)	Boston University (21–13–2)	Maine (24-8-6)	8.
9.	Cornell (2)	Wisconsin (0–0–0)	Maine (1–0–0)	Colorado College (2–0–0)	Cornell (0–0–0) (1)	Boston University (4–3–0)	North Dakota (5–4–0)	Western Michigan (6–1–1)	St. Cloud State (9–4–0)	St. Cloud State (9–4–0)	St. Cloud State (10–5–0)	Michigan (11–6–1)	Michigan (11–6–1)	Michigan (12–7–1)	UMass Lowell (12–6–2)	Ohio State (15–6–1)	Connecticut (14–8–2)	Ohio State (16–8–2)	Boston University (15–10–1)	Boston University (17–11–1)	Connecticut (17–10–3)	Ohio State (21–11–2)	Boston University (20–12–2)	Ohio State (24–12–2)	Ohio State (24–13–2)	Minnesota (25-11-4)	9.
10.	Wisconsin	Michigan (1–1–0)	Michigan (2–1–1)	Michigan (3–2–1)	St. Cloud State (6–1–0)	North Dakota (3–4–0)	Providence (6–1–2)	Providence (7–2–2)	Providence (8–3–2)	Providence (10–3–2)	Colorado College (9–4–1)т	UMass Lowell (10–4–2)	UMass Lowell (10–4–2)	St. Cloud State (11–7–0)	Michigan (13–8–1)	Michigan (14–9–1)	Boston University (13–9–1)	UMass Lowell (14–8–3)	Arizona State (17–10–1)	Michigan (17–12–3)	Boston University (18–12–1)	Boston University (18–12–2)	Ohio State (23–12–2)	Providence (21–10–5)	Providence (21–10–5)	Massachusetts (21-14-5)	10.
11.	Colorado College	Maine (1–0–0)	Colorado College (2–0–0)	Quinnipiac (1–2–0)	Michigan (3–2–1)	Providence (5–1–1)	Boston University (5–4–0)	St. Cloud State (8–3–0)	Cornell (4–2–2)	Boston University (8–5–1)	UMass Lowell (10–3–2)т	Minnesota State (14–4–2)	St. Cloud State (11–7–0)	Ohio State (14–5–1)	Boston University (11–7–1)	Arizona State (13–8–1)	Ohio State (15–7–2)	Connecticut (14–9–3)	Connecticut (15–10–3)	Connecticut (16–10–3)	Michigan (17–12–3)	Michigan (18–13–3)	Penn State (20–12–4)	Arizona State (21–13–2)	Quinnipiac (24–11–2)	Ohio State (24-14-2)	11.
12.	Maine	Colorado College (0–0–0)	Omaha (2–0–0)	St. Cloud State (4–1–0)	Providence (3–1–1)	St. Cloud State (6–3–0)	St. Cloud State (8–3–0)	North Dakota (5–6–0)	Ohio State (9–2–1)	Cornell (4–2–3)	Minnesota State (12–4–2)	St. Cloud State (10–7–0)	Minnesota State (14–4–2)	Minnesota State (14–4–2)	Minnesota State (15–5–2)	UMass Lowell (12–7–2)	Arizona State (14–9–1)	Arizona State (16–9–1)	Michigan (16–12–2)	Arizona State (17–11–2)	Arizona State (18–12–2)	Arizona State (19–13–2)	Arizona State (19–13–2)	Quinnipiac (24–10–2)	Penn State (20–13–4)	Cornell (19-11-6)	12.
13.	Providence	Providence (0–0–0)	St. Cloud State (3–0–0)	Providence (2–1–0)	Western Michigan (3–1–0)	Ohio State (7–0–1)	Western Michigan (5–1–0)	Boston University (5–5–1)	Boston University (6–5–1)	Dartmouth (6–1–1)	Boston University (8–6–1)	Boston University (9–6–1)	Ohio State (13–4–1)	Colorado College (10–7–1)	Arizona State (11–8–1)	Connecticut (12–8–2)	Michigan (14–10–2)	Michigan (15–11–2)	UMass Lowell (14–10–3)	UMass Lowell (15–11–3)	Quinnipiac (21–9–2)	Quinnipiac (22–10–2)	Quinnipiac (22–10–2)	Penn State (20–13–4)	Massachusetts (20–13–5)	Providence (21-11-5)	13.
14.	Massachusetts	Massachusetts (1–0–0)	Providence (0–1–0)	Western Michigan (3–0–0)	Quinnipiac (2–3–0)	Western Michigan (3–1–0)	Ohio State (7–2–1)	Ohio State (9–2–1)	North Dakota (7–6–0)	UMass Lowell (10–3–1)	Cornell (5–3–3)	Ohio State (13–4–1)	North Dakota (11–7–1)	North Dakota (11–7–1)	North Dakota (12–8–1)	Minnesota State (16–6–2)	Quinnipiac (15–8–2)	Quinnipiac (16–8–2)	Minnesota State (20–8–2)	Quinnipiac (19–9–2)	Minnesota State (22–8–2)	Minnesota State (23–8–3)	Massachusetts (19–12–5)	Massachusetts (20–13–5)	Minnesota State (27–8–3)	Minnesota State (27-9-3)	14.
15.	Omaha	Omaha (0–0–0)	Massachusetts (2–1–0)	Massachusetts (3–2–0)	Ohio State (5–0–1)	Quinnipiac (3–3–0)	UMass Lowell (6–2–0)	UMass Lowell (8–2–0)	Dartmouth (5–0–1)	Minnesota State (10–4–2)	Ohio State (11–4–1)	North Dakota (11–7–1)	Boston University (9–7–1)	Boston University (9–7–1)	St. Cloud State (11–9–0)	Quinnipiac (14–7–2)	Minnesota State (17–7–2)	Minnesota State (18–8–2)	Quinnipiac (17–9–2)	Minnesota State (20–8–2)	Penn State (17–11–4)	Penn State (18–12–4)	Minnesota State (25–8–3)	Minnesota State (26–8–3)	Arizona State (21–14–2)	Quinnipiac (24-12-2)	15.
16.	St. Cloud State	St. Cloud State (1–0–0)	Wisconsin (1–1–0)	Omaha (2–2–0)	Minnesota State (5–3–0)	Minnesota State (6–4–0)	Minnesota State (7–4–1)	Dartmouth (5–0–1)	UMass Lowell (9–3–0)	North Dakota (7–7–1)	North Dakota (9–7–1)	Cornell (5–3–3)	Cornell (5–3–3)	Arizona State (10–7–1)	Quinnipiac (13–7–1)	North Dakota (12–10–1)	North Dakota (12–10–1)	North Dakota (13–10–2)	Massachusetts (15–11–2)	Massachusetts (16–12–2)	UMass Lowell (15–12–3)	Massachusetts (18–12–4)	Michigan (18–15–3)	Michigan (18–15–3)	Cornell (18–10–6)	Arizona State (21-14-2)	16.
17.	Western Michigan	Western Michigan (0–0–0)	Western Michigan (2–0–0)	Notre Dame (3–1–0)	Massachusetts (3–3–1)	UMass Lowell (5–1–0)	Dartmouth (4–0–0)	Minnesota State (8–4–2)	Minnesota State (10–4–2)	Ohio State (9–4–1)	Dartmouth (6–3–1)	Dartmouth (6–3–2)	Dartmouth (7–4–2)	New Hampshire (10–4–3)	Connecticut (11–8–1)	St. Cloud State (11–11–0)	Wisconsin (11–12–3)	Augustana (16–7–3)	North Dakota (14–11–2)	North Dakota (15–12–2)	Massachusetts (17–12–3)	UMass Lowell (15–13–4)	North Dakota (19–14–2)	North Dakota (21–14–2)	Michigan (18–15–3)	Michigan (18-15-3)	17.
18.	Minnesota Duluth	Northeastern (0–0–0)	Notre Dame (2–0–0)	Minnesota State (3–3–0)	Penn State (4–1–0)	Massachusetts (4–3–1)	Penn State (4–3–0)	Quinnipiac (5–5–0)	Quinnipiac (6–6–0)	Quinnipiac (6–6–1)	Quinnipiac (8–6–1)	Quinnipiac (8–6–1)	Quinnipiac (9–6–1)	Cornell (6–4–3)	Colorado College (10–9–1)	New Hampshire (10–8–3)	New Hampshire (11–9–3)	Massachusetts (14–11–2)	Penn State (14–11–3)	Penn State (16–11–3)	North Dakota (17–12–2)	North Dakota (18–13–2)	Clarkson (21–10–3)	Clarkson (23–11–3)	North Dakota (21–15–2)	North Dakota (21-15-2)	18.
19.	Notre Dame	Minnesota State (1–1–0)	Northeastern (1–0–0)	Ohio State (3–0–1)	Notre Dame (4–2–0)	Penn State (4–3–0)	Quinnipiac (3–5–0)	Clarkson (8–3–1)	Arizona State (6–7–1)	Arizona State (6–7–1)	Arizona State (8–7–1)	Arizona State (8–7–1)	Arizona State (8–7–1)	Clarkson (11–5–2)	New Hampshire (10–6–3)	Colorado College (11–10–1)	Augustana (14–7–3)	Wisconsin (11–14–3)	Colorado College (14–13–1)	Clarkson (18–9–3)	Clarkson (20–9–3)	Clarkson (21–10–3)	UMass Lowell (15–15–4)	Holy Cross (24–13–2)	Clarkson (24–12–3)	Bentley (23-15-2)	19.
20.	Arizona Stateт; Northeasternт	Notre Dame (0–0–0)	Minnesota State (2–2–0)	Wisconsin (1–3–0)	UMass Lowell (4–1–0)	Notre Dame (5–3–0)	Harvard (2–1–0)	Massachusetts (5–5–2)	Clarkson (9–4–1)	Clarkson (9–5–2)	Clarkson (11–5–2)	Clarkson (11–5–2)	Clarkson (11–5–2)	Quinnipiac (10–7–1)	Clarkson (12–6–2)	Clarkson (13–7–2)	Massachusetts (13–10–2)	Colorado College (13–12–1)	Omaha (16–11–1)	Colorado College (16–13–1)	Colorado College (17–14–1)	Colorado College (17–14–1)т Holy Cross (20–12–2)т	Omaha (18–15–1)	UMass Lowell (16–16–4)	Bentley (23–14–2)	Clarkson (24-12-3)	20.
	Preseason Sep 23	Week 1 Oct 7	Week 2 Oct 14	Week 3 Oct 21	Week 4 Oct 28	Week 5 Nov 4	Week 6 Nov 11	Week 7 Nov 18	Week 8 Nov 25	Week 9 Dec 2	Week 10 Dec 9	Week 11 Dec 16	Week 13 Dec 30	Week 14 Jan 6	Week 15 Jan 13	Week 16 Jan 20	Week 17 Jan 27	Week 18 Feb 3	Week 19 Feb 10	Week 20 Feb 17	Week 21 Feb 24	Week 22 Mar 3	Week 23 Mar 10	Week 24 Mar 17	Week 25 Mar 24	Final Apr 14	
		Dropped: Arizona State; Minnesota Duluth	None	Dropped: Northeastern	Dropped: Omaha; Wisconsin	None	Dropped: Massachusetts; Notre Dame	Dropped: Penn State; Harvard	Dropped: Massachusetts	None	None	None	None	Dropped: Dartmouth	Dropped: Cornell	None	Dropped: St. Cloud State; Colorado College; Clarkson	Dropped: New Hampshire	Dropped: Augustana; Wisconsin	Dropped: Omaha	None	None	Dropped: Colorado College; Holy Cross	Dropped: Omaha	Dropped: Holy Cross; UMass Lowell	None	

== USA Hockey ==
	Preseason Sep 30	Week 1 Oct 7	Week 2 Oct 14	Week 3 Oct 21	Week 4 Oct 28	Week 5 Nov 4	Week 6 Nov 11	Week 7 Nov 18	Week 8 Nov 25	Week 9 Dec 2	Week 10 Dec 9	Week 11 Dec 16	Week 13 Dec 30	Week 14 Jan 6	Week 15 Jan 13	Week 16 Jan 20	Week 17 Jan 27	Week 18 Feb 3	Week 19 Feb 10	Week 20 Feb 17	Week 21 Feb 24	Week 22 Mar 3	Week 23 Mar 10	Week 24 Mar 17	Week 25 Mar 24	Week 26 Mar 31	Final Apr 14	
1.	Denver (27)	Denver (2–0–0) (26)	Denver (2–0–0) (33)	Denver (4–0–0) (33)	Denver (6–0–0) (33)	Denver (8–0–0) (33)	Denver (10–0–0) (34)	Denver (12–0–0) (34)	Michigan State (9–1–0) (24)	Michigan State (11–1–0) (31)	Minnesota (15–2–1) (29)	Michigan State (13–2–1) (21)	Michigan State (14–2–1) (28)	Michigan State (17–2–1) (27)	Michigan State (18–2–2) (33)	Boston College (16–4–1) (24)	Boston College (18–4–1) (27)	Boston College (19–4–1) (33)	Boston College (21–4–1) (34)	Michigan State (22–5–3) (20)	Boston College (24–6–1) (33)	Boston College (25–6–2) (34)	Boston College (26–6–2) (34)	Michigan State (25–6–4) (23)	Michigan State (26–6–4) (20)	Western Michigan (32–7–1) (29)	Western Michigan (34–7–1) (34)	1.
2.	Boston College (4)	Boston College (0–0–0) (6)	Boston College (1–1–0)	Boston College (2–1–0)	Boston College (3–1–0)	Boston College (5–1–0)	Boston College (7–1–0)	Michigan State (9–1–0)	Denver (12–2–0) (5)	Denver (12–2–0) (2)	Michigan State (12–2–0) (2)	Boston College (12–3–1) (11)	Boston College (12–3–1) (6)	Boston College (12–3–1) (7)	Boston College (13–4–1)	Michigan State (19–3–2) (10)	Michigan State (20–3–3) (7)	Michigan State (21–4–3) (1)	Michigan State (22–5–3)	Boston College (22–6–1) (13)	Minnesota (23–7–4)	Michigan State (24–6–4)	Michigan State (24–6–4)	Boston College (26–7–2) (10)	Boston College (26–7–2) (13)	Denver (31–11–1) (4)	Boston University (24–14–2)	2.
3.	Boston University	Boston University (1–0–0)	Boston University (2–0–0)	Boston University (3–0–0)	Michigan State (5–1–0)	Michigan State (5–1–0)	Michigan State (7–1–0)т	Boston College (7–2–0)	Boston College (9–3–0) (1)	Boston College (10–3–0)	Boston College (11–3–1) (1)	Minnesota (15–3–2) (1)	Minnesota (15–3–2)	Minnesota (17–3–2)	Minnesota (18–4–2)	Minnesota (19–5–2)	Western Michigan (17–4–1)	Minnesota (21–6–3)	Minnesota (21–6–3)	Western Michigan (22–5–1) (1)	Michigan State (22–6–4)	Minnesota (24–8–4)	Western Michigan (26–7–1)	Western Michigan (28–7–1) (1)	Western Michigan (30–7–1) (1)	Boston University (23–13–2)	Denver (31–12–1)	3.
4.	Michigan State	Michigan State (2–0–0)	Michigan State (3–1–0)	Michigan State (3–1–0)	Minnesota (5–1–0)	Minnesota (7–1–0)	Minnesota (7–1–0)т	Minnesota (10–2–0)	Minnesota (12–2–0) (4)	Minnesota (13–2–1) (1)	Denver (13–3–0) (1)	Maine (12–2–2) (1)	Western Michigan (11–3–1)	Providence (14–3–2)	Providence (15–3–2)	Western Michigan (15–4–1)	Minnesota (19–6–3)	Western Michigan (18–5–1)	Western Michigan (20–5–1)	Minnesota (21–7–4)	Western Michigan (23–6–1) (1)	Maine (21–6–5)	Minnesota (25–10–4)	Maine (22–7–6)	Maine (24–7–6)	Boston College (27–8–2)	Boston College (27–8–2)	4.
5.	Minnesota	Minnesota (0–0–0)	North Dakota (1–0–0)	Minnesota (3–1–0)	Boston University (4–1–0)	Maine (6–0–1)	Cornell (3–0–1)	Michigan (7–2–1)	Maine (8–2–2)	Maine (10–2–2)	Maine (12–2–2)	Denver (14–4–0)	Providence (14–3–2)	Western Michigan (13–4–1)	Western Michigan (13–4–1)	Denver (17–5–0)	Denver (18–6–0)	Maine (17–5–3)	Maine (18–5–4)	Maine (19–5–5)	Maine (19–6–5)	Western Michigan (24–7–1)	Maine (21–7–6)	Minnesota (25–10–4)	Minnesota (25–10–4)	Penn State (22–13–4)	Penn State (22–14–4)	5.
6.	North Dakota	North Dakota (0–0–0)	Minnesota (1–1–0)	Maine (3–0–0)	Maine (4–0–1)	Cornell (2–0–0) (1)	Michigan (7–2–1)	Maine (7–2–2)	Michigan (9–2–1)	Michigan (10–3–1)	Western Michigan (10–3–1)	Western Michigan (10–3–1)	Denver (14–4–0)	Denver (15–5–0)	Denver (17–5–0)т (1)	Providence (15–5–2)	Maine (15–5–3)	Denver (19–6–1)	Denver (20–7–1)	Ohio State (20–8–2)	Denver (23–8–1)	Providence (20–8–5)	Denver (26–9–1)	Denver (26–10–1)	Denver (29–11–1)	Michigan State (26–7–4) (1)	Michigan State (26–7–4)	6.
7.	Quinnipiac	Cornell (0–0–0) (2)	Cornell (0–0–0) (1)	North Dakota (2–1–0)	North Dakota (3–2–0)	Michigan (5–2–1)	Maine (6–2–1)	Cornell (3–1–2)	Western Michigan (8–1–1)	Western Michigan (9–2–1)	Providence (12–3–2)	Providence (12–3–2)	Maine (12–3–2)	Maine (13–4–2)	Maine (15–4–2)т	Maine (15–5–3)	Providence (15–6–3)	Providence (16–6–4)	Providence (16–7–5)	Denver (21–8–1)	Providence (18–8–5)	Denver (24–9–1)	Boston University (20–12–2)	Boston University (21–12–2)	Connecticut (22–11–4)	Maine (24–8–6)	Maine (24–8–6)	7.
8.	Michigan	Quinnipiac (0–0–0)	Quinnipiac (1–0–0)	Cornell (0–0–0) (1)	Cornell (0–0–0) (1)	Colorado College (6–0–0)	Colorado College (8–0–0)	Colorado College (8–1–1)	Colorado College (9–2–1)	Colorado College (9–2–1)	Michigan (10–5–1)	Michigan (11–6–1)	Colorado College (10–5–1)	UMass Lowell (12–4–2)	Ohio State (15–6–1)	Ohio State (15–6–1)	UMass Lowell (13–7–3)	Boston University (14–9–1)	Ohio State (18–8–2)	Boston University (17–11–1)	Boston University (18–12–1)	Connecticut (19–10–4)	Providence (21–9–5)	Connecticut (21–10–4)	Boston University (21–13–2)	Connecticut (23–12–4)	Minnesota (25–11–4)	8.
9.	Cornell (3)	Wisconsin (0–0–0)	Michigan (2–1–1)	Colorado College (2–0–0)	Colorado College (4–0–0)	Boston University (4–3–0)	Providence (6–1–2)	Western Michigan (6–1–1)	St. Cloud State (9–4–0)	St. Cloud State (9–4–0)	St. Cloud State (10–5–0)	UMass Lowell (10–4–2)	Michigan (11–6–1)	Michigan (12–6–1)	UMass Lowell (12–6–2)	Boston University (13–7–1)	Connecticut (14–8–2)	UMass Lowell (14–8–3)	Boston University (15–10–1)	Providence (17–8–5)	Connecticut (17–10–3)	Boston University (18–12–2)	Connecticut (20–10–4)	Ohio State (24–12–2)	Ohio State (24–13–2)	Minnesota (25–11–4)	Connecticut (23–12–4)	9.
10.	Wisconsin	Maine (1–0–0)	Maine (1–0–0)	Quinnipiac (1–2–0)	St. Cloud State (6–1–0)	North Dakota (3–4–0)	North Dakota (5–4–0)	St. Cloud State (8–3–0)	Providence (8–3–2)	Providence (10–3–2)	UMass Lowell (10–3–2)	St. Cloud State (10–7–0)	UMass Lowell (10–4–2)	St. Cloud State (11–7–0)	Michigan (13–8–1)	Michigan (14–9–1)	Boston University (13–9–1)	Connecticut (14–9–3)	Connecticut (15–10–3)	Connecticut (16–10–3)	Ohio State (20–10–2)	Ohio State (21–11–2)	Ohio State (23–12–2)	Providence (21–10–5)	Providence (21–10–5)	Massachusetts (21–14–5)	Massachusetts (21–14–5)	10.
11.	Maine	Providence (0–0–0)	Colorado College (2–0–0)	Michigan (3–2–1)	Michigan (3–2–1)	Providence (5–1–1)	St. Cloud State (8–3–0)т	Providence (7–2–2)	Cornell (4–2–2)	Boston University (8–5–1)	Colorado College (9–4–1)	Colorado College (10–5–1)	St. Cloud State (11–7–0)	Ohio State (14–5–1)	Boston University (11–7–1)	Arizona State (13–8–1)	Ohio State (15–7–2)	Ohio State (16–8–2)	Arizona State (17–10–1)	Michigan (17–12–3)	Michigan (17–12–3)	Michigan (18–13–3)	Penn State (20–12–4)	Quinnipiac (24–10–2)	Massachusetts (20–13–5)	Ohio State (24–14–2)	Cornell (19–11–6)	11.
12.	Colorado College	Colorado College (0–0–0)	Omaha (2–0–0)	Providence (2–1–0)	Providence (3–1–1)	Ohio State (7–0–1)	Western Michigan (5–1–0)т	Ohio State (9–2–1)	Ohio State (9–2–1)	Cornell (4–2–3)	Boston University (8–6–1)	Minnesota State (14–4–2)	Minnesota State (14–4–2)	Minnesota State (14–4–2)	Minnesota State (15–5–2)	Connecticut (12–8–2)	Michigan (14–10–2)	Arizona State (16–9–1)	Michigan (16–12–2)	Arizona State (17–11–2)	Quinnipiac (21–9–2)	Quinnipiac (22–10–2)	Quinnipiac (22–10–2)	Arizona State (21–13–2)	Quinnipiac (24–11–2)	Cornell (19–11–6)	Ohio State (24–14–2)	12.
13.	Providence	Michigan (1–1–0)	St. Cloud State (3–0–0)	Western Michigan (3–0–0)	Quinnipiac (2–3–0)	Western Michigan (3–1–0)	Boston University (5–4–0)	UMass Lowell (8–2–0)	Boston University (6–5–1)	UMass Lowell (10–3–1)	Minnesota State (12–4–2)	Boston University (9–6–1)	Ohio State (13–4–1)	Boston University (9–7–1)	Arizona State (11–8–1)	UMass Lowell (12–7–2)	Arizona State (14–9–1)	Michigan (15–11–2)	UMass Lowell (14–10–3)	UMass Lowell (15–11–3)	Arizona State (18–12–2)	Arizona State (19–13–2)	Arizona State (19–13–2)	Penn State (20–13–4)	Penn State (20–13–4)	Providence (21–11–5)	Quinnipiac (24–12–2)	13.
14.	Massachusetts	Massachusetts (1–0–0)	Providence (0–1–0)	St. Cloud State (4–1–0)	Western Michigan (3–1–0)	St. Cloud State (6–3–0)	Ohio State (7–2–1)	North Dakota (5–6–0)	Dartmouth (5–0–1)	Dartmouth (6–1–1)	Cornell (5–3–3)	Ohio State (13–4–1)	Boston University (9–7–1)	Colorado College (10–7–1)	St. Cloud State (11–9–0)	Minnesota State (16–6–2)	Quinnipiac (15–8–2)	Quinnipiac (16–8–2)	Quinnipiac (17–9–2)	Quinnipiac (19–9–2)	Massachusetts (17–12–3)	Massachusetts (18–12–4)	Massachusetts (19–12–5)	Massachusetts (20–13–5)	Minnesota State (27–8–3)	Quinnipiac (24–12–2)	Providence (21–11–5)	14.
15.	Western Michigan	St. Cloud State (1–0–0)	Wisconsin (1–1–0)	Massachusetts (3–2–0)	Ohio State (5–0–1)	Quinnipiac (3–3–0)	UMass Lowell (6–2–0)	Dartmouth (5–0–1)	North Dakota (7–6–0)	Minnesota State (10–4–2)	Ohio State (11–4–1)	North Dakota (11–7–1)	North Dakota (11–7–1)	Arizona State (10–7–1)	Quinnipiac (13–7–1)	Quinnipiac (14–7–2)	Minnesota State (17–7–2)	Minnesota State (18–8–2)	Minnesota State (20–8–2)	Minnesota State (20–8–2)	UMass Lowell (15–12–3)	Penn State (18–12–4)	Michigan (18–15–3)	Minnesota State (26–8–3)	Arizona State (21–14–2)	Minnesota State (27–9–3)	Minnesota State (27–9–3)	15.
16.	St. Cloud State	Omaha (0–0–0)	Western Michigan (2–0–0)	Minnesota State (3–3–0)	Minnesota State (5–3–0)	UMass Lowell (5–1–0)	Minnesota State (7–4–1)	Boston University (5–5–1)	UMass Lowell (9–3–0)	Ohio State (9–4–1)	Quinnipiac (8–6–1)	Dartmouth (6–3–2)	Cornell (5–3–3)	New Hampshire (10–4–3)	North Dakota (12–8–1)	North Dakota (12–10–1)	New Hampshire (11–9–3)	North Dakota (13–10–2)	Massachusetts (15–11–2)	Massachusetts (16–12–2)	Penn State (17–11–4)	Minnesota State (23–8–3)	Minnesota State (25–8–3)	Michigan (18–15–3)	Cornell (18–10–6)	Arizona State (21–14–2)	Arizona State (21–14–2)	16.
17.	Omaha	Western Michigan (0–0–0)	Massachusetts (2–1–0)	Notre Dame (3–1–0)т	Massachusetts (3–3–1)	Massachusetts (4–3–1)	Dartmouth (4–0–0)	Minnesota State (8–4–2)	Minnesota State (10–4–2)	North Dakota (7–7–1)	Dartmouth (6–3–1)	Cornell (5–3–3)	Quinnipiac (9–6–1)	North Dakota (11–7–1)	Connecticut (11–8–1)	St. Cloud State (11–11–0)	North Dakota (12–10–1)	Augustana (16–7–3)	North Dakota (14–11–2)	Penn State (16–11–3)	Minnesota State (22–8–2)	UMass Lowell (15–13–4)	Clarkson (21–10–3)	North Dakota (21–14–2)	Michigan (18–15–3)	Michigan (18–15–3)	Michigan (18–15–3)	17.
18.	Minnesota Duluth	Notre Dame (0–0–0)	Notre Dame (2–0–0)	Ohio State (3–0–1)т	Penn State (4–1–0)	Minnesota State (6–4–0)	Penn State (4–3–0)	Quinnipiac (5–5–0)	Quinnipiac (6–6–0)	Quinnipiac (6–6–1)	North Dakota (9–7–1)	Quinnipiac (8–6–1)	Dartmouth (7–4–2)	Quinnipiac (10–7–1)	New Hampshire (10–6–3)	New Hampshire (10–8–3)	Wisconsin (11–12–3)	Massachusetts (14–11–2)	Penn State (14–11–3)	North Dakota (15–12–2)	North Dakota (17–12–2)	North Dakota (18–13–2)	North Dakota (19–14–2)	Clarkson (23–11–3)	Clarkson (24–12–3)	North Dakota (21–15–2)	North Dakota (21–15–2)	18.
19.	Notre Dame	Minnesota State (1–1–0)	Northeastern (1–0–0)	Omaha (2–2–0)	UMass Lowell (4–1–0)	Penn State (4–3–0)	Harvard (2–1–0)	Clarkson (8–3–1)	Clarkson (9–4–1)	Arizona State (6–7–1)	Clarkson (11–5–2)	Arizona State (8–7–1)	Clarkson (11–5–2)	Clarkson (11–5–2)	Colorado College (10–9–1)	Colorado College (11–10–1)	Dartmouth (11–7–2)	New Hampshire (11–10–3)	Colgate (15–10–3)	Clarkson (18–9–3)	Clarkson (20–9–3)	Clarkson (21–10–3)	UMass Lowell (15–15–4)	Cornell (16–10–6)	North Dakota (21–15–2)	Clarkson (24–12–3)	Clarkson (24–12–3)	19.
20.	St. Thomas	Northeastern (0–0–0)	Penn State (2–1–0)	Penn State (2–1–0)	Notre Dame (4–2–0)	Union (6–1–0)	Massachusetts (4–4–2)	Michigan Tech (6–2–0)	Arizona State (6–7–1)	Clarkson (9–5–2)	Arizona State (8–7–1)	Clarkson (11–5–2)	New Hampshire (8–4–3)	Cornell (6–4–3)	Clarkson (12–6–2)	Cornell (7–5–5)	Massachusetts (13–10–2)	Wisconsin (11–14–3)	Omaha (16–11–1)	Augustana (17–9–4)	Cornell (12–9–6)	Holy Cross (20–12–2)	Cornell (14–10–6)	UMass Lowell (16–16–4)	Bentley (23–14–2)	Bentley (23–15–2)	Bentley (23–15–2)	20.
	Preseason Sep 30	Week 1 Oct 7	Week 2 Oct 14	Week 3 Oct 21	Week 4 Oct 28	Week 5 Nov 4	Week 6 Nov 11	Week 7 Nov 18	Week 8 Nov 25	Week 9 Dec 2	Week 10 Dec 9	Week 11 Dec 16	Week 13 Dec 30	Week 14 Jan 6	Week 15 Jan 13	Week 16 Jan 20	Week 17 Jan 27	Week 18 Feb 3	Week 19 Feb 10	Week 20 Feb 17	Week 21 Feb 24	Week 22 Mar 3	Week 23 Mar 10	Week 24 Mar 17	Week 25 Mar 24	Week 26 Mar 31	Final Apr 14	
		Dropped: Minnesota Duluth; St. Thomas	Dropped: Minnesota State	Dropped: Wisconsin; Northeastern	Dropped: Omaha	Dropped: Notre Dame	Dropped: Quinnipiac; Union	Dropped: Penn State; Harvard; Massachusetts	Dropped: Michigan Tech	None	None	None	Dropped: Arizona State	Dropped: Dartmouth	Dropped: Cornell	Dropped: Clarkson	Dropped: St. Cloud State; Colorado College; Cornell	Dropped: Dartmouth	Dropped: Augustana; New Hampshire; Wisconsin	Dropped: Colgate; Omaha	Dropped: Augustana	Dropped: Cornell	Dropped: Holy Cross	None	Dropped: UMass Lowell	None	None	
