= 2025–26 Big Ten Conference ice hockey season =

- Season: 2025–26
- Conference: Big Ten Conference
- Division: Division I
- Sport: ice hockey
- Duration: October 3, 2025– March 21, 2026
- Number of teams: 7
- TV partner(s): Big Ten Network

NHL Entry Draft

Regular Season
- Season champions: Michigan State
- Top scorer: Gavin McKenna

Big Ten Tournament
- Tournament champions: Michigan
- Runners-up: Ohio State
- Tournament MVP: T. J. Hughes

NCAA Tournament

The 2025–26 Big Ten men's ice hockey season will be the 36th season of play for the Big Ten Conference's men's ice hockey division and will take place during the 2025–26 NCAA Division I men's ice hockey season. The season will begin on October 3, 2025, and the conference tournament is set to concluded on March 21, 2026.

== Head coaches ==
- After Jeff Jackson retired, Notre Dame promoted Brock Sheahan to fill the post.

=== Records ===
| Team | Head coach | Season at school | Record at school | Big Ten record |
|---|---|---|---|---|
| Michigan | Brandon Naurato | 4 | 67–42–9 | 35–31–6 |
| Michigan State | Adam Nightingale | 4 | 69–35–9 | 41–23–8 |
| Minnesota | Bob Motzko | 8 | 161–82–21 | 101–47–18 |
| Notre Dame | Brock Sheahan | 1 | 0–0–0 | 0–0–0 |
| Ohio State | Steve Rohlik | 13 | 221–177–45 | 108–114–23 |
| Penn State | Guy Gadowsky | 15 | 231–200–32 | 104–128–23 |
| Wisconsin | Mike Hastings | 3 | 39–33–5 | 23–23–2 |

== Preseason ==
Head coaches were polled prior to the season and asked to both rank member programs as well as vote for all-conference teams.

=== Preseason Big Ten poll ===
| Rank | Team |
|---|---|
| 1 | Michigan State |
| 2 | Penn State |
| 3 | Minnesota |
| 4 | Michigan |
| 5 | Wisconsin |
| 6 | Ohio State |
| 7 | Notre Dame |

=== Preseason All-Big Ten ===
| First Team | Position | Second Team |
|---|---|---|
| Trey Augustine, Michigan State | G | Kristoffer Eberly, Ohio State |
| Mac Gadowsky, Penn State | D | Paul Fischer, Notre Dame |
| Matt Basgall, Michigan State | D | Luke Mittelstadt, Minnesota |
| Cole Knuble, Notre Dame | F | Michael Hage, Michigan |
| Aiden Fink, Penn State | F | T. J. Hughes, Michigan |
| Quinn Finley, Wisconsin | F | Gavin McKenna, Penn State |

== Standings ==
2025–26 Big Ten ice hockey Standings
| | Conference record | | | | | | | | | | Overall record | | | | | |
| | GP | W | L | T | OTW | OTL | 3/SW | PTS | GF | GA | GP | W | L | T | GF | GA |
|---|---|---|---|---|---|---|---|---|---|---|---|---|---|---|---|---|
| #5 Michigan State † | 24 | 16 | 6 | 2 | 2 | 2 | 1 | 51 | 88 | 54 | 37 | 26 | 9 | 2 | 136 | 79 |
| #3 Michigan * | 24 | 17 | 6 | 1 | 4 | 0 | 1 | 49 | 96 | 66 | 40 | 31 | 8 | 1 | 181 | 96 |
| #11 Penn State | 24 | 12 | 10 | 2 | 1 | 3 | 1 | 41 | 86 | 82 | 37 | 21 | 14 | 2 | 136 | 117 |
| #2 Wisconsin | 24 | 14 | 10 | 0 | 3 | 0 | 0 | 39 | 95 | 84 | 39 | 24 | 13 | 2 | 142 | 115 |
| Ohio State | 24 | 8 | 15 | 1 | 1 | 5 | 0 | 29 | 78 | 100 | 37 | 14 | 21 | 2 | 119 | 134 |
| Minnesota | 24 | 7 | 15 | 2 | 0 | 2 | 2 | 27 | 61 | 79 | 36 | 11 | 22 | 3 | 97 | 125 |
| Notre Dame | 24 | 5 | 17 | 2 | 3 | 2 | 0 | 12 | 65 | 104 | 37 | 9 | 23 | 5 | 103 | 151 |
Championship: March 21, 2026 † indicates conference regular season champion * indicates conference tournament champion Rankings: USCHO.com Top 20 Poll; updated April 15, 2026

== Non-Conference record ==
The Big Ten finished the year with an outstanding non-conference record, with the conference as a whole having winning records against every other conference except the NCHC.

=== Regular season record ===
| Team | AHA | CCHA | ECAC Hockey | Hockey East | Independent | NCHC | Total |
|---|---|---|---|---|---|---|---|
| Michigan | 4–0–0 | 0–0–0 | 2–0–0 | 2–0–0 | 0–0–0 | 1–1–0 | 9–1–0 |
| Michigan State | 0–0–0 | 4–0–0 | 2–0–0 | 3–1–0 | 0–0–0 | 0–0–0 | 9–1–0 |
| Minnesota | 0–0–0 | 1–1–0 | 0–0–0 | 0–1–1 | 1–1–0 | 2–3–0 | 4–6–1 |
| Notre Dame | 1–0–1 | 0–0–2 | 2–1–0 | 1–1–0 | 0–0–0 | 0–3–0 | 4–5–3 |
| Ohio State | 1–1–0 | 2–1–1 | 0–0–0 | 1–1–0 | 0–0–0 | 0–2–0 | 4–5–1 |
| Penn State | 1–1–0 | 0–0–0 | 1–1–0 | 0–0–0 | 4–0–0 | 2–0–0 | 8–2–0 |
| Wisconsin | 0–0–0 | 1–0–2 | 0–0–0 | 0–0–0 | 6–0–0 | 0–1–0 | 7–1–2 |
| Overall | 7–2–1 | 8–2–5 | 7–2–0 | 7–4–1 | 11–1–0 | 5–10–0 | 45–21–7 |

== Conference tournament ==
Quarterfinals; March 11
2 | Michigan | 6
7 | Notre Dame | 1
(Teams are reseeded after the Quarterfinal round)
3 | Penn State | 6
6 | Minnesota | 2
4 | Wisconsin | 1
5 | Ohio State | 7

Semifinals; March 14
1 | Michigan State | 2
5 | Ohio State | 3*
2 | Michigan | 5
3 | Penn State | 2

Championship; March 21
5 | Ohio State | 3
2 | Michigan | 7

Note: * denotes overtime periods.

== Ranking ==
=== USCHO ===
| Team | Pre | 1 | 2 | 3 | 4 | 5 | 6 | 7 | 8 | 9 | 10 | 11 | 13 | 14 | 15 | 16 | 17 | 18 | 19 | 20 | 21 | 22 | 23 | 24 | 25 | Final |
|---|---|---|---|---|---|---|---|---|---|---|---|---|---|---|---|---|---|---|---|---|---|---|---|---|---|---|
| Michigan | 12 | 9 | 4 | 3 | 2 | 2 | 2 | 2 | 1 | 1 | 1 | 1 | 1 | 1 | 1 | 1 | 1 | 1 | 2 | 2 | 2 | 1 | 1 | 1 | 1 | – |
| Michigan State | 3 | 2 | 3 | 1 | 1 | 1 | 1 | 1 | 3 | 3 | 3 | 3 | 3 | 2 | 4 | 2 | 2 | 2 | 1 | 1 | 1 | 2 | 3 | 3 | 3 | – |
| Minnesota | 8 | 12 | 13 | 12 | 19 | NR | NR | NR | NR | NR | NR | NR | NR | NR | NR | NR | NR | NR | NR | NR | NR | NR | NR | NR | NR | – |
| Notre Dame | NR | NR | NR | NR | NR | NR | NR | NR | NR | NR | NR | NR | NR | NR | NR | NR | NR | NR | NR | NR | NR | NR | NR | NR | NR | – |
| Ohio State | 16 | 16 | 16 | 14 | 17 | 19 | NR | NR | NR | NR | NR | NR | NR | NR | NR | NR | NR | NR | NR | NR | NR | NR | NR | 19 | NR | – |
| Penn State | 5 | 4 | 6 | 5 | 4 | 3 | 5 | 5 | 9 | 9 | 9 | 9 | 8 | 9 | 8 | 8 | 5 | 6 | 6 | 6 | 5 | 6 | 10 | 10 | 10 | – |
| Wisconsin | 20 | 18 | 17 | 17 | 14 | 10 | 7 | 7 | 2 | 2 | 2 | 2 | 2 | 3 | 2 | 5 | 8 | 13 | 13 | 13 | 12 | 11 | 10 | 12 | 12 | – |

Note: USCHO did not release a poll in week 12 or 26.

=== USA Hockey ===
| Team | Pre | 1 | 2 | 3 | 4 | 5 | 6 | 7 | 8 | 9 | 10 | 11 | 13 | 14 | 15 | 16 | 17 | 18 | 19 | 20 | 21 | 22 | 23 | 24 | 25 | 26 | Final |
|---|---|---|---|---|---|---|---|---|---|---|---|---|---|---|---|---|---|---|---|---|---|---|---|---|---|---|---|
| Michigan | 12 | 7 | 3 | 3 | 2 | 2 | 2 | 2 | 1 | 1 | 1 | 1 | 1 | 1 | 1 | 1 | 1 | 1 | 2 | 2 | 2 | 1 | 1 | 1 | 1 | 1 | – |
| Michigan State | 3 | 2 | 4 | 1 | 1 | 1 | 1 | 1 | 3 | 3 | 3 | 3 | 3 | 2 | 3 | 2 | 2 | 2 | 1 | 1 | 1 | 3 | 3 | 3 | 3 | 5 | – |
| Minnesota | 7 | 12 | 14 | 12 | 18 | NR | NR | NR | NR | NR | NR | NR | NR | NR | NR | NR | NR | NR | NR | NR | NR | NR | NR | NR | NR | NR | – |
| Notre Dame | NR | NR | NR | NR | NR | NR | NR | NR | NR | NR | NR | NR | NR | NR | NR | NR | NR | NR | NR | NR | NR | NR | NR | NR | NR | NR | – |
| Ohio State | 17 | 16 | 15 | 15 | 17 | NR | NR | NR | NR | NR | NR | NR | NR | NR | NR | NR | NR | NR | NR | NR | NR | NR | NR | 19 | NR | NR | – |
| Penn State | 5 | 4 | 6 | 5 | 4 | 3 | 5 | 5 | 9 | 9 | 9 | 9 | 9 | 9 | 8 | 8 | 5 | 6 | 7 | 6 | 5 | 6 | 10 | 11 | 9 | 11 | – |
| Wisconsin | 19 | 18 | 17 | 16 | 14 | 9 | 7 | 8 | 2 | 2 | 2 | 2 | 2 | 3 | 2 | 5 | 7 | 11 | 12 | 14 | 13 | 11 | 11 | 12 | 12 | 4 | – |

Note: USA Hockey did not release a poll in week 12.

=== NPI ===
| Team | 1 | 2 | 3 | 4 | 5 | 6 | 7 | 8 | 9 | 10 | 11 | 13 | 14 | 15 | 16 | 17 | 18 | 19 | 20 | 21 | 22 | 23 | 24 | Final |
|---|---|---|---|---|---|---|---|---|---|---|---|---|---|---|---|---|---|---|---|---|---|---|---|---|
| Michigan | – | – | 5 | – | – | 6 | 6 | 4 | 2 | 2 | 1 | 1 | 1 | 1 | 1 | 1 | 2 | 2 | 2 | 1 | 1 | 1 | 1 | – |
| Michigan State | – | – | 10 | – | – | 11 | 8 | 13 | 10 | 7 | 5 | 5 | 6 | 2 | 2 | 2 | 1 | 1 | 1 | 2 | 3 | 3 | 3 | – |
| Minnesota | – | – | 31 | – | – | 40 | 41 | 42 | 36 | 27 | 28 | 32 | 36 | 37 | 41 | 32 | 38 | 41 | 34 | 37 | 38 | 39 | 38 | – |
| Notre Dame | – | – | 42 | – | – | 54 | 55 | 56 | 54 | 52 | 53 | 53 | 52 | 53 | 54 | 52 | 53 | 52 | 53 | 53 | 52 | 51 | 51 | – |
| Ohio State | – | – | 12 | – | – | 41 | 14 | 25 | 24 | 30 | 30 | 33 | 31 | 33 | 32 | 34 | 29 | 27 | 29 | 23 | 23 | 19 | 19 | – |
| Penn State | – | – | 13 | – | – | 8 | 7 | 11 | 9 | 8 | 8 | 8 | 8 | 6 | 4 | 5 | 5 | 5 | 5 | 5 | 11 | 10 | 11 | – |
| Wisconsin | – | – | 1 | – | – | 2 | 2 | 2 | 3 | 3 | 3 | 3 | 3 | 7 | 10 | 14 | 15 | 15 | 13 | 12 | 12 | 12 | 7 | – |

Note: Teams ranked in the top-10 automatically qualify for the NCAA tournament. Teams ranked 11-16 can qualify based upon conference tournament results.

== Awards ==
=== Big Ten ===
| Award | | Recipient |
|---|---|---|
| Player of the Year | | T. J. Hughes, Michigan |
| Defensive Player of the Year | | Matt Basgall, Michigan State |
| Goaltender of the Year | | Trey Augustine, Michigan State |
| Freshman of the Year | | Gavin McKenna, Penn State |
| Scoring Champion | | Gavin McKenna, Penn State |
| Coach of the Year | | Adam Nightingale, Michigan State |
| Tournament Most Outstanding Player | | T. J. Hughes, Michigan |
All-Big Ten Teams
| First Team | Position | Second Team |
| Trey Augustine, Michigan State | G | Jack Ivankovic, Michigan |
| Matt Basgall, Michigan State | D | Tyler Duke, Michigan |
| Ben Dexheimer, Wisconsin | D | Jackson Smith, Penn State |
| T. J. Hughes, Michigan | F | Michael Hage, Michigan |
| Porter Martone, Michigan State | F | Brodie Ziemer, Minnesota |
| Charlie Stramel, Michigan State | F | Gavin McKenna, Penn State |
| Freshman Team | Position | |
| Jack Ivankovic, Michigan | G | |
| Jackson Smith, Penn State | D | |
| Luke Osburn, Wisconsin | D | |
| Porter Martone, Michigan State | F | |
| Jake Karabela, Ohio State | F | |
| Gavin McKenna, Penn State | F | |
