= 2025–26 Minnesota Golden Gophers men's ice hockey season =

- Conference: Big Ten
- Home ice: 3M Arena at Mariucci

Record
- Overall: 11–22–3
- Conference: 7–15–2
- Home: 7–11–2
- Road: 3–11–1
- Neutral: 1–0–0

Coaches and captains
- Head coach: Bob Motzko
- Assistant coaches: Steve Miller; Ben Gordon; Brennan Poderzay
- Captain(s): Brody Lamb; Luke Mittelstadt; Cal Thomas

The 2025–26 Minnesota Golden Gophers men's ice hockey season is the 105th season of play for the program and 36th in the Big Ten. The Golden Gophers represent the University of Minnesota in the 2025–26 NCAA Division I men's ice hockey season, play their home games at 3M Arena at Mariucci and are coached by Bob Motzko in his eighth season.

== Departures ==
Player	Position	Nationality	Cause
Matthew Bryant	Goaltender	United States	Graduation (retired)
Ryan Chesley	Defenseman	United States	Signed professional contract (Washington Capitals)
Aaron Huglen	Forward	United States	Graduation (signed with Wilkes-Barre/Scranton Penguins)
Mike Koster	Defenseman	United States	Graduation (signed with Iowa Heartlanders)
Connor Kurth	Forward	United States	Signed professional contract (Tampa Bay Lightning)
Nick Michel	Forward	United States	Graduation (retired)
Oliver Moore	Forward	United States	Signed professional contract (Chicago Blackhawks)
Mason Nevers	Forward	United States	Graduation (signed with Idaho Steelheads)
Sam Rinzel	Defenseman	United States	Signed professional contract (Chicago Blackhawks)
Jimmy Snuggerud	Forward	United States	Signed professional contract (St. Louis Blues)
Liam Soulière	Goaltender	Canada	Graduation (signed with Toledo Walleye)
Matthew Wood	Forward	Canada	Signed professional contract (Nashville Predators)

== Recruiting ==
Player	Position	Nationality	Age	Notes
Luca Di Pasquo	Goaltender	United States	21	Livonia, MI; transfer from Michigan State
Graham Harris	Forward	United States	22	Excelsior, MN; transfer from Augsburg
Tanner Ludtke	Forward	United States	20	Elko, MN; transfer from Omaha; selected 81st overall in 2023
Finn McLaughlin	Defenseman	Canada	19	Canmore, AB
Mason Moe	Forward	United States	18	Eden Prairie, MN; selected 90th overall in 2025
L. J. Mooney	Forward	United States	18	West Mifflin, PA; selected 113th overall in 2025
Javon Moore	Forward	United States	19	Minnetonka, MN; selected 112th overall in 2024
Tate Pritchard	Forward	United States	20	Savage, MN
Jacob Rombach	Defenseman	United States	18	Blaine, MN; selected 35th overall in 2025
Teddy Townsend	Forward	United States	19	Eden Prairie, MN

== Roster ==
As of September 1, 2025.

No.	Nat.	Player	Class	Pos	Height	Weight	DoB	Hometown	Previous team	NHL rights
3	(United States)	Tate Pritchard	Freshman	F	6' 2" (1.88 m)	192 lb (87 kg)	2004-11-19	Chanhassen, Minnesota	Sioux City Musketeers (USHL)	—
4	(United States)	John Whipple	Sophomore	D	6' 1" (1.85 m)	194 lb (88 kg)	2006-01-20	Morristown, New Jersey	USNTDP (USHL)	DET, 144th overall 2024
5	(United States)	Jacob Rombach	Freshman	D	6' 6" (1.98 m)	209 lb (95 kg)	2007-04-01	Blaine, Minnesota	Lincoln Stars (USHL)	NSH, 35th overall 2025
7	(United States)	Beckett Hendrickson	Sophomore	F	6' 2" (1.88 m)	174 lb (79 kg)	2005-06-24	Minnetonka, Minnesota	Dubuque Fighting Saints (USHL)	BOS, 124th overall 2023
9	(United States)	August Falloon	Sophomore	F	6' 2" (1.88 m)	201 lb (91 kg)	2004-02-23	St. Cloud, Minnesota	Tri-City Storm (USHL)	—
11	(United States)	Tanner Ludtke	Junior	F	6' 0" (1.83 m)	180 lb (82 kg)	2004-11-27	Elko, Minnesota	Omaha (NCHC)	UTA, 81st overall 2023
15	(United States)	Max Rud	Junior	D	6' 3" (1.91 m)	185 lb (84 kg)	2003-09-17	St. Cloud, Minnesota	Sioux Falls Stampede (USHL)	—
17	(United States)	Brody Lamb (C)	Senior	F	6' 1" (1.85 m)	175 lb (79 kg)	2003-08-30	Byron, Minnesota	Green Bay Gamblers (USHL)	NYR, 104th overall 2021
18	(United States)	L. J. Mooney	Freshman	F	5' 7" (1.7 m)	157 lb (71 kg)	2007-03-08	West Mifflin, Pennsylvania	USNTDP (USHL)	MTL, 113th overall 2025
19	(United States)	John Mittelstadt	Senior	F	5' 9" (1.75 m)	175 lb (79 kg)	2001-10-27	Eden Prairie, Minnesota	Green Bay Gamblers (USHL)	—
20	(United States)	Luke Mittelstadt (C)	Senior	D	5' 11" (1.8 m)	175 lb (79 kg)	2003-01-22	Eden Prairie, Minnesota	Madison Capitols (USHL)	MTL, 197th overall 2023
22	(United States)	Cal Thomas (C)	Senior	D	6' 1" (1.85 m)	205 lb (93 kg)	2003-05-08	Maple Grove, Minnesota	Chicago Steel (USHL)	UTA, 171st overall 2021
23	(United States)	Jimmy Clark	Junior	F	6' 0" (1.83 m)	170 lb (77 kg)	2004-09-24	Edina, Minnesota	Green Bay Gamblers (USHL)	MIN, 213th overall 2023
24	(Canada)	Finn McLaughlin	Freshman	D	6' 2" (1.88 m)	207 lb (94 kg)	2006-02-28	Canmore, Alberta	Muskegon Lumberjacks (USHL)	—
27	(United States)	Javon Moore	Freshman	F	6' 4" (1.93 m)	203 lb (92 kg)	2005-12-07	Minnetonka, Minnesota	Sioux Falls Stampede (USHL)	OTT, 112th overall 2024
29	(Canada)	Nathan Airey	Junior	G	6' 3" (1.91 m)	190 lb (86 kg)	2003-04-24	Cochrane, Alberta	Cranbrook Bucks (BCHL)	—
30	(United States)	Zach Wiese	Senior	G	5' 10" (1.78 m)	210 lb (95 kg)	2002-01-02	Owatonna, Minnesota	Rochester Grizzlies (NA3HL)	—
31	(United States)	Luca Di Pasquo	Junior	G	6' 0" (1.83 m)	201 lb (91 kg)	2003-09-24	Livonia, Michigan	Michigan State (Big Ten)	—
33	(United States)	Axel Begley	Junior	D	6' 2" (1.88 m)	200 lb (91 kg)	2003-12-16	Mahtomedi, Minnesota	Wisconsin Windigo (NAHL)	—
34	(United States)	Graham Harris	Sophomore	F	6' 0" (1.83 m)	185 lb (84 kg)	2003-06-04	Excelsior, Minnesota	Augsburg (MIAC)	—
44	(United States)	Teddy Townsend	Freshman	F	5' 10" (1.78 m)	174 lb (79 kg)	2005-09-02	Eden Prairie, Minnesota	Waterloo Black Hawks (USHL)	—
55	(United States)	Leo Gruba	Sophomore	D	6' 2" (1.88 m)	209 lb (95 kg)	2003-12-14	Lake Elmo, Minnesota	Fargo Force (USHL)	—
72	(Sweden)	Erik Påhlsson	Sophomore	F	6' 1" (1.85 m)	185 lb (84 kg)	2004-04-09	Landskrona, Sweden	Dubuque Fighting Saints (USHL)	NSH, 213th overall 2024
74	(United States)	Brodie Ziemer	Sophomore	F	5' 11" (1.8 m)	196 lb (89 kg)	2006-02-22	Carver, Minnesota	USNTDP (USHL)	BUF, 71st overall 2024
79	(United States)	Mason Moe	Freshman	F	6' 2" (1.88 m)	192 lb (87 kg)	2007-03-26	Eden Prairie, Minnesota	USNTDP (USHL)	NJD, 90th overall 2025

== Standings ==
2025–26 Big Ten ice hockey Standings
	Conference record										Overall record					
	GP	W	L	T	OTW	OTL	3/SW	PTS	GF	GA	GP	W	L	T	GF	GA
#5 Michigan State †	24	16	6	2	2	2	1	51	88	54	37	26	9	2	136	79
#3 Michigan *	24	17	6	1	4	0	1	49	96	66	40	31	8	1	181	96
#11 Penn State	24	12	10	2	1	3	1	41	86	82	37	21	14	2	136	117
#2 Wisconsin	24	14	10	0	3	0	0	39	95	84	39	24	13	2	142	115
Ohio State	24	8	15	1	1	5	0	29	78	100	37	14	21	2	119	134
Minnesota	24	7	15	2	0	2	2	27	61	79	36	11	22	3	97	125
Notre Dame	24	5	17	2	3	2	0	12	65	104	37	9	23	5	103	151
Championship: March 21, 2026 † indicates conference regular season champion * indicates conference tournament champion Rankings: USCHO.com Top 20 Poll; updated April 15, 2026

== Schedule and results ==
Date	Time	Opponent^{#}	Rank^{#}	Site	TV	Decision	Result	Attendance	Record
Regular season
October 3	7:00 pm	Michigan Tech*	#8	3M Arena at Mariucci • Minneapolis, Minnesota	Fox9+	Airey	W 6–3	9,580	1–0–0
October 4	7:00 pm	Michigan Tech*	#8	3M Arena at Mariucci • Minneapolis, Minnesota	Fox9+	Di Pasquo	L 3–5	8,972	1–1–0
October 9	8:00 pm	#11 Boston College*	#12	3M Arena at Mariucci • Minneapolis, Minnesota	BTN	Airey	L 1–3	8,145	1–2–0
October 10	6:00 pm	#11 Boston College*	#12	3M Arena at Mariucci • Minneapolis, Minnesota	B1G+	Airey	T 2–2 ^{OT}	9,279	1–2–1
October 17	7:00 pm	at #8 North Dakota*	#13	Ralph Engelstad Arena • Grand Forks, North Dakota (Rivalry)	Midco	Airey	L 2–5	11,634	1–3–1
October 18	6:00 pm	at #8 North Dakota*	#13	Ralph Engelstad Arena • Grand Forks, North Dakota (Rivalry)	Midco	Di Pasquo	W 5–1	11,710	2–3–1
October 24	7:00 pm	#19 Minnesota Duluth*	#12	3M Arena at Mariucci • Minneapolis, Minnesota (Rivalry)	My9	Di Pasquo	L 0–3	9,630	2–4–1
October 25	7:00 pm	#19 Minnesota Duluth*	#12	3M Arena at Mariucci • Minneapolis, Minnesota (Rivalry)	My9	Airey	L 1–4	9,694	2–5–1
October 30	8:00 pm	at #14 Wisconsin	#19	Kohl Center • Madison, Wisconsin (Rivalry)	BTN	Di Pasquo	L 2–5	7,007	2–6–1 (0–1–0)
November 1	6:00 pm	at #14 Wisconsin	#19	Kohl Center • Madison, Wisconsin (Rivalry)	B1G+	Airey	L 0–4	10,016	2–7–1 (0–2–0)
November 7	7:00 pm	Notre Dame		3M Arena at Mariucci • Minneapolis, Minnesota	B1G+	Di Pasquo	W 3–0	9,529	3–7–1 (1–2–0)
November 8	7:00 pm	Notre Dame		3M Arena at Mariucci • Minneapolis, Minnesota	B1G+	Di Pasquo	W 4–1	8,947	4–7–1 (2–2–0)
November 14	7:30 pm	Long Island*		3M Arena at Mariucci • Minneapolis, Minnesota		Di Pasquo	L 1–5	8,708	4–8–1
November 15	5:00 pm	Long Island*		3M Arena at Mariucci • Minneapolis, Minnesota		Airey	W 6–3	8,704	5–8–1
November 21	7:00 pm	#5 Penn State		3M Arena at Mariucci • Minneapolis, Minnesota	FS1, TSN2	Airey	W 3–2	9,094	6–8–1 (3–2–0)
November 22	7:00 pm	#5 Penn State		3M Arena at Mariucci • Minneapolis, Minnesota	BTN+, Fox9+	Airey	L 1–2	9,336	6–9–1 (3–3–0)
November 29	8:00 pm	vs. #4 Denver*		Ball Arena • Denver, Colorado (US Hockey Hall of Fame Game)	Fox9+	Di Pasquo	W 6–5 ^{OT}	12,228	7–9–1
December 4	6:30 pm	at Ohio State		Value City Arena • Columbus, Ohio	BTN	Di Pasquo	W 6–3	4,297	8–9–1 (4–3–0)
December 5	5:00 pm	at Ohio State		Value City Arena • Columbus, Ohio	BTN	Airey	L 5–6 ^{OT}	4,484	8–10–1 (4–4–0)
January 2	7:00 pm	at Bemidji State		Sanford Center • Bemidji, Minnesota (Exhibition)	Midco Sports+, Fox9+	Airey	T 3–3 ^{SOL}	4,231	
January 9	5:00 pm	at #9 Penn State		Pegula Ice Arena • University Park, Pennsylvania	BTN+	Di Pasquo	L 0–3	6,192	8–11–1 (4–5–0)
January 10	5:00 pm	at #9 Penn State		Pegula Ice Arena • University Park, Pennsylvania	BTN	Airey	L 2–5	6,334	8–12–1 (4–6–0)
January 16	7:00 pm	#1 Michigan		3M Arena at Mariucci • Minneapolis, Minnesota	BTN+, Fox9	Di Pasquo	L 1–5	9,948	8–13–1 (4–7–0)
January 17	6:00 pm	#1 Michigan		3M Arena at Mariucci • Minneapolis, Minnesota	BTN+, Fox9	Di Pasquo	L 2–3 ^{OT}	9,852	8–14–1 (4–8–0)
January 23	6:00 pm	at #2 Michigan State		Munn Ice Arena • East Lansing, Michigan	BTN+	Di Pasquo	L 1–3	6,555	8–15–1 (4–9–0)
January 24	5:00 pm	at #2 Michigan State		Munn Ice Arena • East Lansing, Michigan	BTN	Di Pasquo	L 2–3	6,555	8–16–1 (4–10–0)
January 30	7:00 pm	#8 Wisconsin		3M Arena at Mariucci • Minneapolis, Minnesota (Rivalry)	BTN+, Fox9	Di Pasquo	W 4–1	10,113	9–16–1 (5–10–0)
January 31	6:00 pm	#8 Wisconsin		3M Arena at Mariucci • Minneapolis, Minnesota (Rivalry)	BTN+, Fox9	Di Pasquo	W 8–4	10,652	10–16–1 (6–10–0)
February 6	7:00 pm	Ohio State		3M Arena at Mariucci • Minneapolis, Minnesota	BTN+, Fox9	Di Pasquo	L 2–6	9,381	10–17–1 (6–11–0)
February 7	8:00 pm	Ohio State		3M Arena at Mariucci • Minneapolis, Minnesota	BTN	Di Pasquo	L 1–2	8,707	10–18–1 (6–12–0)
February 13	6:00 pm	at Notre Dame		Compton Family Ice Arena • Notre Dame, Indiana	Peacock	Di Pasquo	T 2–2 ^{SOW}	5,050	10–18–2 (6–12–1)
February 14	5:00 pm	at Notre Dame		Compton Family Ice Arena • Notre Dame, Indiana	Peacock	Di Pasquo	L 2–3	5,120	10–19–2 (6–13–1)
February 26	5:30 pm	at #2 Michigan		Yost Ice Arena • Ann Arbor, Michigan	BTN	Di Pasquo	W 4–2	5,547	11–19–2 (7–13–1)
February 27	5:00 pm	at #2 Michigan		Yost Ice Arena • Ann Arbor, Michigan	BTN	Di Pasquo	L 2–4	5,800	11–20–2 (7–14–1)
March 5	7:00 pm	#2 Michigan State		3M Arena at Mariucci • Minneapolis, Minnesota	BTN+, Fox9	Di Pasquo	L 1–7	8,916	11–21–2 (7–15–1)
March 6	7:00 pm	#2 Michigan State		3M Arena at Mariucci • Minneapolis, Minnesota	BTN+, Fox9+	Di Pasquo	T 3–3 ^{SOW}	9,265	11–21–3 (7–15–2)
Big Ten Tournament
March 11	6:00 pm	at #10т Penn State*		Pegula Ice Arena • University Park, Pennsylvania (Quarterfinal)	BTN+	Di Pasquo	L 2–6	4,938	11–22–3
*Non-conference game. ^{#}Rankings from USCHO.com Poll. All times are in Central Time. Source:

== Rankings ==
Poll	Week																											
Poll	Pre	1	2	3	4	5	6	7	8	9	10	11	12	13	14	15	16	17	18	19	20	21	22	23	24	25	26	27 (Final)
USCHO.com	8	12	13	12	19	RV	NR	NR	NR	NR	NR	NR	–	NR	NR	NR	NR	NR	NR	NR	NR	NR	NR	NR	NR	NR		
USA Hockey	7	12	14	12	18	RV	RV	NR	NR	NR	NR	NR	–	NR	NR	NR	NR	NR	NR	NR	NR	NR	NR	NR	NR	NR		

Note: USCHO did not release a poll in week 12.
Note: USA Hockey did not release a poll in week 12.
