= 2025–26 Wisconsin Badgers men's ice hockey season =

NCAA Tournament, Runner-Up
- Conference: Big Ten
- Home ice: Kohl Center

Rankings
- USCHO: #12
- USA Today: #12

Record
- Overall: 24–13–2
- Conference: 14–10–0
- Home: 10–7–2
- Road: 10–4–0
- Neutral: 4–2–0

Coaches and captains
- Head coach: Mike Hastings
- Assistant coaches: Todd Knott; Nick Oliver; Kevin Murdock
- Captain: Ben Dexheimer
- Alternate captain(s): Gavin Morrissey; Joe Palodichuk; Zach Schulz

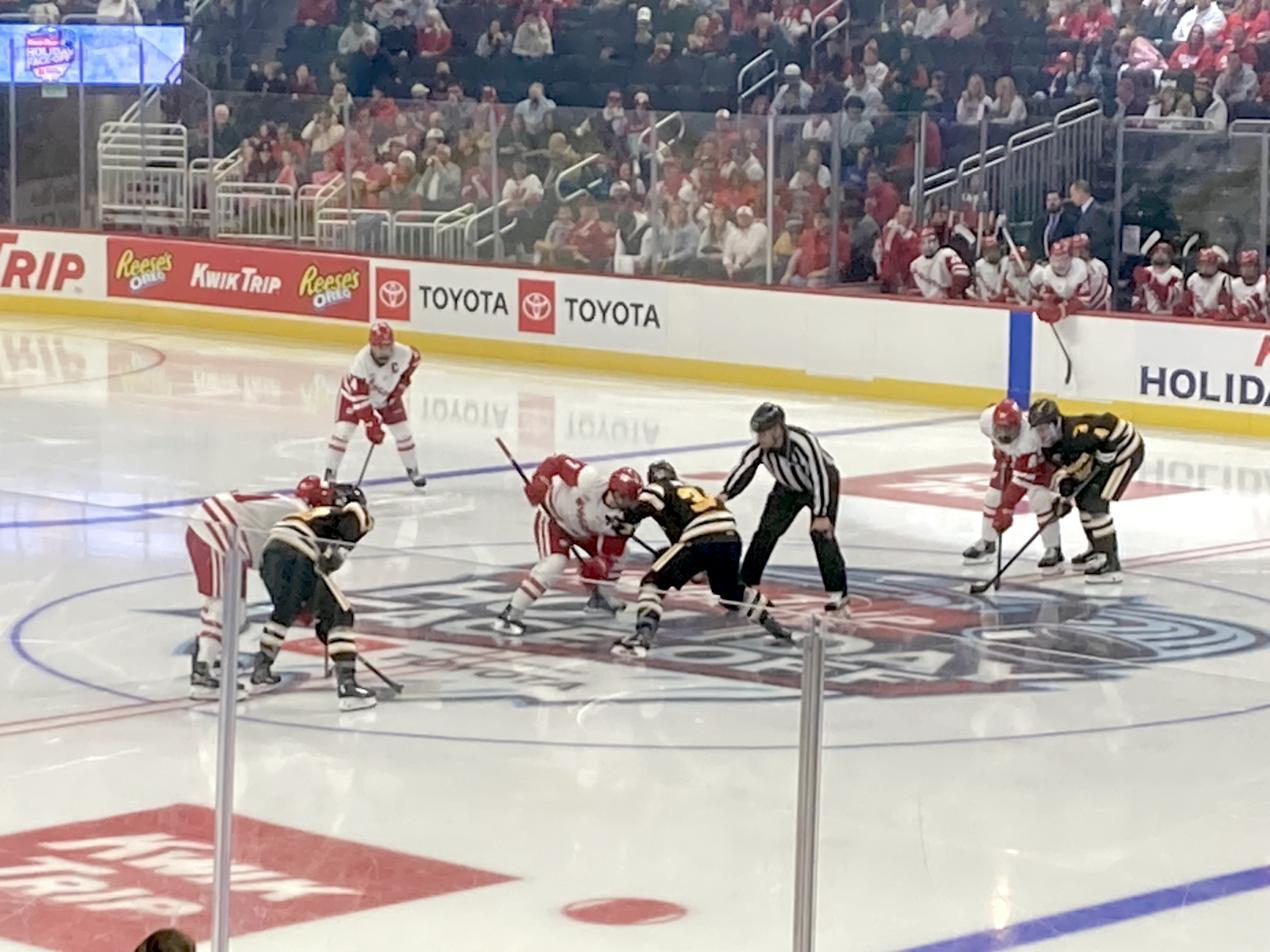
Wisconsin playing Western Michigan during the Holiday Face–Off in Milwaukee

The 2025–26 Wisconsin Badgers men's ice hockey season was the 77th season of play for the program and 25th in the Big Ten. The Badgers represent the University of Wisconsin–Madison in the 2025–26 NCAA Division I men's ice hockey season, played their home games at Kohl Center and were coached by Mike Hastings in his third season. The Badgers advanced to the national championship game for the first time since 2010, losing to Denver.

== Departures ==
Player	Position	Nationality	Cause
Luke Buss	Forward	United States	Transferred to Union
William Gramme	Goaltender	Sweden	Transferred to Northern Michigan
Anthony Kehrer	Defenseman	Canada	Graduation (signed with Springfield Thunderbirds)
Daniel Laatsch	Defenseman	United States	Graduation (signed with Pittsburgh Penguins)
Cody Laskosky	Forward	Canada	Graduation (retired)
Owen Lindmark	Forward	United States	Graduation (signed with San Diego Gulls)
Owen Mehlenbacher	Forward	Canada	Transferred to Massachusetts
Ryland Mosley	Forward	Canada	Graduation (signed with Cleveland Monsters)
Tommy Scarfone	Goaltender	Canada	Graduation (signed with Cincinnati Cyclones)
Sawyer Scholl	Forward	United States	Transferred to Minnesota State

== Recruiting ==
Player	Position	Nationality	Age	Notes
Finn Brink	Forward	United States	20	Maple Grove, MN
Grady Deering	Forward	United States	20	Des Moines, IA
Aiden Dubinsky	Defenseman	United States	21	Highland Park, IL; transfer from Minnesota Duluth
Daniel Hauser	Goaltender	Canada	21	Chestermere, AB
Bruno Idžan	Forward	Croatia	19	Zagreb, CRO; selected 181st overall in 2025
Blake Montgomery	Forward	United States	20	Annapolis, MD; selected 117th overall in 2024
Eli Pulver	Goaltender	Canada	22	Vancouver, BC; transfer from Minnesota State
Oliver Tulk	Forward	Canada	20	Gibsons, BC
Vasily Zelenov	Forward	Austria	19	Moskva, RUS; selected 204th overall in 2024

== Roster ==
As of September 2, 2025.

No.	Nat.	Player	Class	Pos	Height	Weight	DoB	Hometown	Previous team	NHL rights
2	(United States)	Luke Osburn	Freshman	D	6' 1" (1.85 m)	185 lb (84 kg)	2006-09-09	Plymouth, Michigan	Youngstown Phantoms (USHL)	BUF, 108th overall 2024
4	(United States)	Ben Dexheimer (C)	Senior	D	5' 10" (1.78 m)	172 lb (78 kg)	2002-06-21	Edina, Minnesota	Madison Capitols (USHL)	—
5	(United States)	Zach Schulz (A)	Junior	D	6' 1" (1.85 m)	185 lb (84 kg)	2005-06-14	South Lyon, Michigan	USNTDP (USHL)	NYI, 177th overall 2023
6	(United States)	Logan Hensler	Sophomore	D	6' 2" (1.88 m)	196 lb (89 kg)	2006-10-14	Woodbury, Minnesota	USNTDP (USHL)	OTT, 23rd overall 2025
7	(United States)	Gavin Morrissey (A)	Sophomore	F	5' 11" (1.8 m)	181 lb (82 kg)	2003-02-16	Rochester Hills, Michigan	Fargo Force (USHL)	—
8	(United States)	Jack Phelan	Sophomore	F	6' 3" (1.91 m)	185 lb (84 kg)	2004-05-28	Hinsdale, Illinois	Sioux Falls Stampede (USHL)	DET, 137th overall 2023
9	(United States)	Kyle Kukkonen	Senior	F	5' 10" (1.78 m)	174 lb (79 kg)	2002-11-13	Maple Grove, Minnesota	Michigan Tech (CCHA)	ANA, 162nd overall 2021
11	(Canada)	Simon Tassy	Senior	F	6' 2" (1.88 m)	190 lb (86 kg)	2001-03-21	Montreal, Quebec	Minnesota State (CCHA)	—
13	(Canada)	Christian Fitzgerald	Senior	F	6' 0" (1.83 m)	185 lb (84 kg)	2002-05-31	Coquitlam, British Columbia	Minnesota State (CCHA)	—
14	(United States)	Joe Palodichuk (A)	Junior	D	6' 0" (1.83 m)	171 lb (78 kg)	2003-02-26	Cottage Grove, Minnesota	Fargo Force (USHL)	—
16	(Canada)	Tyson Dyck	Senior	F	6' 0" (1.83 m)	170 lb (77 kg)	2004-02-06	Abbotsford, British Columbia	Massachusetts (HEA)	OTT, 206th overall 2022
17	(United States)	Grady Deering	Freshman	F	6' 2" (1.88 m)	209 lb (95 kg)	2005-06-19	Des Moines, Iowa	Waterloo Black Hawks (USHL)	—
18	(United States)	Adam Pietila	Sophomore	F	5' 11" (1.8 m)	191 lb (87 kg)	2003-01-14	Hartland, Michigan	Youngstown Phantoms (USHL)	—
19	(United States)	Quinn Finley	Junior	F	6' 0" (1.83 m)	179 lb (81 kg)	2004-08-08	Suamico, Wisconsin	Chicago Steel (USHL)	NYI, 78th overall 2022
21	(Canada)	Ryan Botterill	Sophomore	F	5' 11" (1.8 m)	176 lb (80 kg)	2003-07-23	Portage la Prairie, Manitoba	Youngstown Phantoms (USHL)	—
22	(United States)	Jack Horbach	Senior	F	5' 11" (1.8 m)	176 lb (80 kg)	2002-05-04	Naperville, Illinois	Madison Capitols (USHL)	—
26	(United States)	Weston Knox	Sophomore	D	6' 0" (1.83 m)	181 lb (82 kg)	2004-04-06	Andover, Minnesota	Minot Minotauros (NAHL)	—
27	(United States)	Finn Brink	Freshman	F	5' 10" (1.78 m)	185 lb (84 kg)	2005-04-06	Maple Grove, Minnesota	Madison Capitols (USHL)	—
28	(United States)	Aiden Dubinsky	Senior	D	6' 0" (1.83 m)	180 lb (82 kg)	2004-04-28	Highland Park, Illinois	Minnesota Duluth (NCHC)	—
30	(Canada)	Eli Pulver	Sophomore	G	6' 1" (1.85 m)	165 lb (75 kg)	2003-03-02	Vancouver, British Columbia	Minnesota State (CCHA)	—
31	(Canada)	Daniel Hauser	Freshman	G	5' 11" (1.8 m)	165 lb (75 kg)	2004-01-29	Chestermere, Alberta	Calgary Hitmen (WHL)	—
33	(United States)	Anton Castro	Sophomore	G	6' 1" (1.85 m)	181 lb (82 kg)	2003-01-23	Mendota Heights, Minnesota	Fargo Force (USHL)	—
47	(United States)	Blake Montgomery	Freshman	F	6' 4" (1.93 m)	196 lb (89 kg)	2005-05-04	Annapolis, Maryland	London Knights (OHL)	OTT, 117th overall 2024
55	(Canada)	Oliver Tulk	Freshman	F	5' 8" (1.73 m)	174 lb (79 kg)	2005-01-19	Gibsons, British Columbia	Calgary Hitmen (WHL)	—
91	(Croatia)	Bruno Idžan	Freshman	F	6' 0" (1.83 m)	194 lb (88 kg)	2006-01-16	Zagreb, Croatia	Lincoln Stars (USHL)	OTT, 181st overall 2025
94	(Austria)	Vasily Zelenov	Freshman	F	6' 0" (1.83 m)	192 lb (87 kg)	2006-02-02	Moskva, Russia	Green Bay Gamblers (USHL)	BUF, 204th overall 2024

== Standings ==
2025–26 Big Ten ice hockey Standings
	Conference record										Overall record					
	GP	W	L	T	OTW	OTL	3/SW	PTS	GF	GA	GP	W	L	T	GF	GA
#5 Michigan State †	24	16	6	2	2	2	1	51	88	54	37	26	9	2	136	79
#3 Michigan *	24	17	6	1	4	0	1	49	96	66	40	31	8	1	181	96
#11 Penn State	24	12	10	2	1	3	1	41	86	82	37	21	14	2	136	117
#2 Wisconsin	24	14	10	0	3	0	0	39	95	84	39	24	13	2	142	115
Ohio State	24	8	15	1	1	5	0	29	78	100	37	14	21	2	119	134
Minnesota	24	7	15	2	0	2	2	27	61	79	36	11	22	3	97	125
Notre Dame	24	5	17	2	3	2	0	12	65	104	37	9	23	5	103	151
Championship: March 21, 2026 † indicates conference regular season champion * indicates conference tournament champion Rankings: USCHO.com Top 20 Poll; updated April 15, 2026

== Schedule and results ==
Date	Time	Opponent^{#}	Rank^{#}	Site	TV	Decision	Result	Attendance	Record
Regular season
October 3	7:10 pm	at Lindenwood*	#20	Centene Community Ice Center • St. Charles, Missouri		Hauser	W 3–0	2,001	1–0–0
October 4	7:10 pm	at Lindenwood*	#20	Centene Community Ice Center • St. Charles, Missouri		Hauser	W 7–2	2,152	2–0–0
October 9	7:00 pm	USNTDP*	#18	Kohl Center • Madison, Wisconsin (Exhibition)	B1G+	Pulver	W 6–0	—	—
October 16	7:00 pm	#20 Minnesota State*	#17	Kohl Center • Madison, Wisconsin	B1G+	Hauser	T 1–1 ^{OT}	6,555	2–0–1
October 17	7:00 pm	#20 Minnesota State*	#17	Kohl Center • Madison, Wisconsin	B1G+	Hauser	T 2–2 ^{OT}	8,478	2–0–2
October 24	7:00 pm	Alaska*	#17	Kohl Center • Madison, Wisconsin	B1G+	Hauser	W 5–3	8,190	3–0–2
October 25	6:00 pm	Alaska*	#17	Kohl Center • Madison, Wisconsin	B1G+	Hauser	W 4–1	10,584	4–0–2
October 30	8:00 pm	#19 Minnesota	#14	Kohl Center • Madison, Wisconsin (Rivalry)	BTN	Hauser	W 5–2	7,007	5–0–2 (1–0–0)
November 1	6:00 pm	#19 Minnesota	#14	Kohl Center • Madison, Wisconsin (Rivalry)	B1G+	Hauser	W 4–0	10,016	6–0–2 (2–0–0)
November 7	6:00 pm	at #2 Michigan	#10	Yost Ice Arena • Ann Arbor, Michigan	B1G+	Hauser	L 4–7	5,800	6–1–2 (2–1–0)
November 8	6:00 pm	at #2 Michigan	#10	Yost Ice Arena • Ann Arbor, Michigan	BTN	Hauser	W 6–1	5,800	7–1–2 (3–1–0)
November 14	7:00 pm	Ohio State	#7	Kohl Center • Madison, Wisconsin	B1G+	Hauser	L 1–5	9,255	7–2–2 (3–2–0)
November 15	6:00 pm	Ohio State	#7	Kohl Center • Madison, Wisconsin	B1G+	Hauser	W 6–5 ^{OT}	10,963	8–2–2 (4–2–0)
November 21	7:30 pm	at #1 Michigan State	#7	Munn Ice Arena • East Lansing, Michigan	B1G+	Pulver	W 5–4	6,555	9–2–2 (5–2–0)
November 22	6:00 pm	at #1 Michigan State	#7	Munn Ice Arena • East Lansing, Michigan	B1G+	Pulver	W 2–1 ^{OT}	6,555	10–2–2 (6–2–0)
December 5	6:00 pm	at Notre Dame	#2	Compton Family Ice Arena • Notre Dame, Indiana	Peacock	Hauser	W 7–4	5,283	11–2–2 (7–2–0)
December 6	5:00 pm	at Notre Dame	#2	Compton Family Ice Arena • Notre Dame, Indiana	Peacock	Hauser	W 9–2	5,046	12–2–2 (8–2–0)
Holiday Face–Off
December 28	4:00 pm	vs. Lake Superior State*	#2	Fiserv Forum • Milwaukee, Wisconsin (Holiday Face–Off Semifinal)	B1G+	Hauser	W 3–2	8,277	13–2–2
December 29	7:30 pm	vs. #7 Western Michigan*	#2	Fiserv Forum • Milwaukee, Wisconsin (Holiday Face–Off Championship)	B1G+	Pulver	L 1–4	7,002	13–3–2
Regular season
January 9	7:00 pm	Alaska Anchorage*	#3	Kohl Center • Madison, Wisconsin	B1G+	Hauser	W 5–0	7,314	14–3–2
January 10	6:00 pm	Alaska Anchorage*	#3	Kohl Center • Madison, Wisconsin	B1G+	Hauser	W 3–2	9,578	15–3–2
January 15	8:00 pm	#4 Michigan State	#2	Kohl Center • Madison, Wisconsin	BTN	Hauser	L 3–4	7,677	15–4–2 (8–3–0)
January 16	7:00 pm	#4 Michigan State	#2	Kohl Center • Madison, Wisconsin	B1G+	Pulver	L 1–4	12,114	15–5–2 (8–4–0)
January 23	7:00 pm	#8 Penn State	#5	Kohl Center • Madison, Wisconsin	B1G+	Hauser	L 2–7	10,187	15–6–2 (8–5–0)
January 24	7:30 pm	#8 Penn State	#5	Kohl Center • Madison, Wisconsin	BTN	Hauser	L 1–3	13,355	15–7–2 (8–6–0)
January 30	7:00 pm	at Minnesota	#8	3M Arena at Mariucci • Minneapolis, Minnesota (Rivalry)	B1G+, Fox9	Hauser	L 1–4	10,113	15–8–2 (8–7–0)
January 31	6:00 pm	at Minnesota	#8	3M Arena at Mariucci • Minneapolis, Minnesota (Rivalry)	B1G+, Fox9	Hauser	L 4–8	10,652	15–9–2 (8–8–0)
February 6	7:00 pm	Notre Dame	#13	Kohl Center • Madison, Wisconsin	B1G+	Hauser	W 6–5 ^{OT}	10,880	16–9–2 (9–8–0)
February 7	7:00 pm	Notre Dame	#13	Kohl Center • Madison, Wisconsin	B1G+	Hauser	W 5–4	12,148	17–9–2 (10–8–0)
February 13	5:30 pm	at Ohio State	#13	Value City Arena • Columbus, Ohio	B1G+	Hauser	W 4–2	4,874	18–9–2 (11–8–0)
February 14	6:30 pm	at Ohio State	#13	Value City Arena • Columbus, Ohio	BTN	Pulver	L 2–3	5,332	18–10–2 (11–9–0)
February 20	7:00 pm	#2 Michigan	#13	Kohl Center • Madison, Wisconsin	B1G+	Pulver	W 4–1	12,633	19–10–2 (12–9–0)
February 21	6:00 pm	#2 Michigan	#13	Kohl Center • Madison, Wisconsin	B1G+	Pulver	L 1–3	15,511	19–11–2 (12–10–0)
March 5	6:00 pm	at #6 Penn State	#11	Pegula Ice Arena • University Park, Pennsylvania	B1G+	Hauser	W 7–3	6,490	20–11–2 (13–10–0)
March 6	6:00 pm	at #6 Penn State	#11	Pegula Ice Arena • University Park, Pennsylvania	B1G+	Hauser	W 5–2	6,494	21–11–2 (14–10–0)
Big Ten Tournament
March 11	7:00 pm	Ohio State*	#10т	Kohl Center • Madison, Wisconsin (Quarterfinal)	B1G+	Hauser	L 1–7	11,297	21–12–2
NCAA Tournament
March 26	4:00 pm	vs. #8 Dartmouth*	#12	DCU Center • Worcester, Massachusetts (Regional Semifinal)	ESPNU	Hauser	W 5–1	4,018	22–12–2
March 28	4:30 pm	vs. #3 Michigan State*	#12	DCU Center • Worcester, Massachusetts (Regional Final)	ESPN2	Hauser	W 4–3 ^{OT}	3,788	23–12–2
April 9	4:00 p.m.	vs. #2 North Dakota*	#12	T-Mobile Arena • Las Vegas, Nevada (National Semifinal)	ESPN2	Hauser	W 2–1	17,942	24–12–2
April 11	5:30 p.m.	vs. #4 Denver*	#12	T-Mobile Arena • Las Vegas, Nevada (National Championship)	ESPN	Hauser	L 1–2	17,849	24–13–2
*Non-conference game. ^{#}Rankings from USCHO.com Poll. All times are in Central Time. Source:

== Rankings ==
Poll	Week																											
Poll	Pre	1	2	3	4	5	6	7	8	9	10	11	12	13	14	15	16	17	18	19	20	21	22	23	24	25	26	27 (Final)
USCHO.com	20	18	17	17	14	10	7	7	2 (3)	2 (4)	2 (21)	2 (13)	–	2 (12)	3 (1)	2 (3)	5	8	13	13	13	12	11	10т	12	12	12	2
USA Hockey	19	18	17	16	14	9	7	8	2	2	2 (16)	2 (5)	–	2 (4)	3	2	5	7	11	12	14	13	11	11	12	12	4	2

Note: USCHO did not release a poll in week 12.
Note: USA Hockey did not release a poll in week 12.
