= 2025–26 Ohio State Buckeyes men's ice hockey season =

- Conference: Big Ten
- Home ice: Value City Arena

Record
- Overall: 14–21–2
- Conference: 5–14–1
- Home: 6–10–1
- Road: 8–11–1

Coaches and captains
- Head coach: Steve Rohlik
- Assistant coaches: J. B. Bittner; Paul Kirtland; Carter Krier
- Captain: Davis Burnside
- Alternate captain(s): Adam Eisele; Nathan McBrayer; Riley Thompson

The 2025–26 Ohio State Buckeyes men's ice hockey season is the 63rd season for the program and 13th season in the Big Ten Conference. The Buckeyes represent the Ohio State University in the 2025–26 NCAA Division I men's ice hockey season, play their home games at Value City Arena and are coached by Steve Rohlik in his 13th season.

== Departures ==
Player	Position	Nationality	Cause
Caden Brown	Forward	United States	Graduate transfer to Ferris State
Damien Carfagna	Defenseman	United States	Signed professional contract (Edmonton Oilers)
Joe Dunlap	Forward	United States	Graduation (signed with Laval Rocket)
Gunnarwolfe Fontaine	Forward	United States	Graduation (signed with Iowa Wild)
Dylan Godbout	Forward	United States	Transferred to St. Thomas
Patrick Guzzo	Forward	United States	Graduation (signed with Manitoba Moose)
Aiden Hansen-Bukata	Defenseman	Canada	Graduation (signed with Syracuse Crunch)
Reilly Herbst	Goaltender	United States	Graduation (retired)
Brent Johnson	Defenseman	United States	Graduation (signed with Wheeling Nailers)
John Larkin	Defenseman	United States	Left program (retired)
Logan Terness	Goaltender	Canada	Graduation (signed with Florida Everblades)
Theo Wallberg	Defenseman	Sweden	Transferred to Western Michigan

== Recruiting ==
Player	Position	Nationality	Age	Notes
Félix Caron	Forward	Canada	20	Terrebonne, QC; transfer from Rensselaer
Niall Crocker	Forward	Canada	21	Delta, BC
Adam Eisele	Forward	United States	24	Lake Elmo, MN; transfer from Minnesota State
Landen Gunderson	Forward	United States	20	Plymouth, MN
Sam Hillebrandt	Goaltender	United States	20	Port Huron, MI
Bryce Ingles	Defenseman	United States	20	Clyde, MI
Jake Karabela	Forward	Canada	21	Guelph, ON; selected 149th overall in 2022
Dawson Labre	Goaltender	Canada	21	Les Cèdres, QC; selected 193rd overall in 2022
Sam McGinley	Defenseman	Canada	22	Calgary, AB; transfer from New Brunswick
Broten Sabo	Defenseman	United States	22	Rosemount, MN; transfer from Alaska
Ethan Straky	Defenseman	United States	22	Walnut Creek, CA; transfer from Colorado College

== Roster ==
As of August 18, 2025.

No.	Nat.	Player	Class	Pos	Height	Weight	DoB	Hometown	Previous team	NHL rights
1	(Canada)	Dawson Labre	Freshman	G	6' 3" (1.91 m)	185 lb (84 kg)	2004-06-22	Les Cèdres, Quebec	West Kelowna Warriors (BCHL)	—
2	(United States)	Chris Able	Sophomore	D	6' 1" (1.85 m)	198 lb (90 kg)	2004-11-04	Libertyville, Illinois	Chicago Steel (USHL)	—
5	(United States)	Ethan Straky	Senior	F	5' 11" (1.8 m)	181 lb (82 kg)	2003-04-18	Walnut Creek, California	Colorado College (NCHC)	—
7	(United States)	Chris Romaine	Sophomore	D	6' 0" (1.83 m)	196 lb (89 kg)	2004-02-21	Boston, Massachusetts	Green Bay Gamblers (USHL)	COL, 193rd overall 2022
8	(United States)	Nathan McBrayer (A)	Junior	D	6' 0" (1.83 m)	173 lb (78 kg)	2004-05-11	Dublin, Ohio	Muskegon Lumberjacks (USHL)	—
9	(Canada)	Riley Thompson (A)	Junior	F	6' 3" (1.91 m)	190 lb (86 kg)	2002-08-17	Orleans, Ontario	Alaska Anchorage (NCAA)	—
10	(United States)	Thomas Weis	Junior	F	5' 9" (1.75 m)	170 lb (77 kg)	2002-02-08	Madison, Wisconsin	Madison Capitols (USHL)	—
11	(Canada)	Jake Rozzi	Sophomore	F	6' 0" (1.83 m)	183 lb (83 kg)	2004-01-27	Kirkland, Quebec	Tri-City Storm (USHL)	—
13	(Canada)	Félix Caron	Sophomore	F	6' 0" (1.83 m)	168 lb (76 kg)	2004-12-01	Terrebonne, Quebec	Rensselaer (ECAC)	—
15	(United States)	Adam Eisele (A)	Graduate	F	6' 1" (1.85 m)	190 lb (86 kg)	2001-07-11	Lake Elmo, Minnesota	Minnesota State (CCHA)	—
16	(United States)	Max Montes	Junior	F	5' 8" (1.73 m)	165 lb (75 kg)	2003-09-01	Hartland, Wisconsin	Dubuque Fighting Saints (USHL)	—
17	(United States)	Landen Gunderson	Freshman	F	6' 1" (1.85 m)	190 lb (86 kg)	2004-11-28	Plymouth, Minnesota	Sioux City Musketeers (USHL)	—
19	(South Korea)	James Hong	Sophomore	F	5' 9" (1.75 m)	168 lb (76 kg)	2004-07-02	Seoul, South Korea	Madison Capitols (USHL)	—
21	(United States)	Bryce Ingles	Freshman	D	5' 9" (1.75 m)	181 lb (82 kg)	2005-06-08	Clyde, Michigan	Sioux Falls Stampede (USHL)	—
23	(United States)	Davis Burnside (C)	Senior	F	6' 0" (1.83 m)	176 lb (80 kg)	2003-09-22	Scottsdale, Arizona	Dubuque Fighting Saints (USHL)	—
24	(Canada)	Niall Crocker	Freshman	F	6' 4" (1.93 m)	196 lb (89 kg)	2004-07-31	Delta, British Columbia	Prince Albert Raiders (WHL)	—
25	(United States)	Sam Deckhut	Junior	F	5' 11" (1.8 m)	186 lb (84 kg)	2002-04-02	San Diego, California	Sioux City Musketeers (USHL)	—
27	(Canada)	Sam McGinley	Junior	D	6' 3" (1.91 m)	165 lb (75 kg)	2002-12-03	Calgary, Alberta	New Brunswick (AUS)	—
28	(United States)	William Smith	Junior	D	6' 1" (1.85 m)	193 lb (88 kg)	2003-03-29	Toronto, Ontario	Omaha Lancers (USHL)	—
29	(United States)	Ryan Gordon	Junior	F	6' 0" (1.83 m)	185 lb (84 kg)	2002-05-05	Duluth, Georgia	Sioux Falls Stampede (USHL)	—
30	(United States)	Sam Hillebrandt	Freshman	G	6' 1" (1.85 m)	170 lb (77 kg)	2005-02-21	Port Huron, Michigan	Barrie Colts (OHL)	—
49	(Canada)	Jake Karabela	Freshman	F	5' 11" (1.8 m)	187 lb (85 kg)	2004-03-07	Guelph, Ontario	Guelph Storm (OHL)	WSH, 149th overall 2022
60	(United States)	Kristoffer Eberly	Junior	G	6' 4" (1.93 m)	208 lb (94 kg)	2002-12-10	Pinckney, Michigan	Green Bay Gamblers (USHL)	—
63	(United States)	Nathan Lewis	Sophomore	F	6' 6" (1.98 m)	209 lb (95 kg)	2004-07-27	Chicago, Illinois	Youngstown Phantoms (USHL)	—
73	(United States)	Broten Sabo	Junior	D	6' 2" (1.88 m)	194 lb (88 kg)	2002-08-09	Rosemount, Minnesota	Alaska (NCAA)	—
91	(United States)	Jake Dunlap	Senior	F	5' 9" (1.75 m)	175 lb (79 kg)	2001-12-05	Windham, New Hampshire	New Hampshire (HEA)	—

== Standings ==
2025–26 Big Ten ice hockey Standings
	Conference record										Overall record					
	GP	W	L	T	OTW	OTL	3/SW	PTS	GF	GA	GP	W	L	T	GF	GA
#5 Michigan State †	24	16	6	2	2	2	1	51	88	54	37	26	9	2	136	79
#3 Michigan *	24	17	6	1	4	0	1	49	96	66	40	31	8	1	181	96
#11 Penn State	24	12	10	2	1	3	1	41	86	82	37	21	14	2	136	117
#2 Wisconsin	24	14	10	0	3	0	0	39	95	84	39	24	13	2	142	115
Ohio State	24	8	15	1	1	5	0	29	78	100	37	14	21	2	119	134
Minnesota	24	7	15	2	0	2	2	27	61	79	36	11	22	3	97	125
Notre Dame	24	5	17	2	3	2	0	12	65	104	37	9	23	5	103	151
Championship: March 21, 2026 † indicates conference regular season champion * indicates conference tournament champion Rankings: USCHO.com Top 20 Poll; updated April 15, 2026

== Schedule and results ==
Date	Time	Opponent^{#}	Rank^{#}	Site	TV	Decision	Result	Attendance	Record
Regular season
October 10	6:30 pm	Northern Michigan*	#16	Value City Arena • Columbus, Ohio		Eberly	W 5–2	3,520	1–0–0
October 11	5:00 pm	Northern Michigan*	#16	Value City Arena • Columbus, Ohio		Eberly	W 3–1	2,976	2–0–0
October 17	7:00 pm	at #12 Connecticut*	#16	Toscano Family Ice Forum • Storrs, Connecticut	ESPN+	Eberly	L 2–3	2,513	2–1–0
October 18	4:00 pm	at #12 Connecticut*	#16	Toscano Family Ice Forum • Storrs, Connecticut	ESPN+	Eberly	W 4–2	5,133	3–1–0
October 24	6:30 pm	Sacred Heart*	#14	Value City Arena • Columbus, Ohio		Eberly	L 1–2 ^{OT}	3,635	3–2–0
October 25	5:00 pm	Sacred Heart*	#14	Value City Arena • Columbus, Ohio		Eberly	W 3–0	3,071	4–2–0
October 30	6:30 pm	#4 Penn State	#17	Value City Arena • Columbus, Ohio	BTN	Eberly	L 2–3	3,709	4–3–0 (0–1–0)
October 31	6:30 pm	#4 Penn State	#17	Value City Arena • Columbus, Ohio		Hillebrandt	L 3–4	4,986	4–4–0 (0–2–0)
November 14	8:00 pm	at #7 Wisconsin		Kohl Center • Madison, Wisconsin		Eberly	W 5–1	9,255	5–4–0 (1–2–0)
November 15	7:00 pm	at #7 Wisconsin		Kohl Center • Madison, Wisconsin		Eberly	L 5–6 ^{OT}	10,963	5–5–0 (1–3–0)
November 21	7:00 pm	at #2 Michigan		Yost Ice Arena • Ann Arbor, Michigan (Rivalry)		Eberly	L 2–5	5,800	5–6–0 (1–4–0)
November 22	7:00 pm	at #2 Michigan		Yost Ice Arena • Ann Arbor, Michigan (Rivalry)		Eberly	L 1–8	5,800	5–7–0 (1–5–0)
November 28	5:00 pm	at Arizona State*		Mullett Arena • Tempe, Arizona		Eberly	L 2–3 ^{OT}	4,507	5–8–0
November 29	7:00 pm	at Arizona State*		Mullett Arena • Tempe, Arizona	Fox 10	Hillebrandt	L 3–4 ^{OT}	4,867	5–9–0
December 4	7:30 pm	Minnesota		Value City Arena • Columbus, Ohio	BTN	Eberly	L 3–6	4,297	5–10–0 (1–6–0)
December 5	6:00 pm	Minnesota		Value City Arena • Columbus, Ohio	BTN	Eberly	W 6–5 ^{OT}	4,484	6–10–0 (2–6–0)
January 2	6:30 pm	Bowling Green*		Value City Arena • Columbus, Ohio	BTN+	Eberly	T 2–2 ^{OT}	5,779	6–10–1
January 3	6:07 pm	at Bowling Green*		Slater Family Ice Arena • Bowling Green, Ohio	Midco Sports+	Hillebrandt	L 3–5	5,000	6–11–1
January 9	6:30 pm	#2 Michigan State		Value City Arena • Columbus, Ohio		Eberly	L 2–6	4,627	6–12–1 (2–7–0)
January 10	5:00 pm	#2 Michigan State		Value City Arena • Columbus, Ohio		Hillebrandt	W 2–1	5,553	7–12–1 (3–7–0)
January 23	7:05 pm	at Notre Dame		Compton Family Ice Arena • Notre Dame, Indiana	Peacock	Hillebrandt	W 4–2	5,186	8–12–1 (4–7–0)
January 24	5:00 pm	at Notre Dame		Compton Family Ice Arena • Notre Dame, Indiana	Peacock	Eberly	L 1–6	5,087	8–13–1 (4–8–0)
January 30	6:30 pm	#1 Michigan		Value City Arena • Columbus, Ohio (Rivalry)		Hillebrandt	L 4–6	7,659	8–14–1 (4–9–0)
January 31	5:00 pm	#1 Michigan		Value City Arena • Columbus, Ohio (Rivalry)		Hillebrandt	L 2–3 ^{OT}	8,188	8–15–1 (4–10–0)
February 6	8:00 pm	at Minnesota		3M Arena at Mariucci • Minneapolis, Minnesota	BTN+, Fox9	Hillebrandt	W 6–2	9,381	9–15–1 (5–10–0)
February 7	9:00 pm	at Minnesota		3M Arena at Mariucci • Minneapolis, Minnesota	BTN	Hillebrandt	W 2–1	8,707	10–15–1 (6–10–0)
February 13	6:30 pm	#13 Wisconsin		Value City Arena • Columbus, Ohio		Hillebrandt	L 2–4	4,874	10–16–1 (6–11–0)
February 14	7:30 pm	#13 Wisconsin		Value City Arena • Columbus, Ohio	BTN	Eberly	W 3–2	5,332	11–16–1 (7–11–0)
February 20	8:30 pm	at #6 Penn State		Pegula Ice Arena • University Park, Pennsylvania	BTN	Hillebrandt	L 4–11	6,486	11–17–1 (7–12–0)
February 21	8:00 pm	at #6 Penn State		Pegula Ice Arena • University Park, Pennsylvania	BTN	Eberly	L 4–5 ^{OT}	6,515	11–18–1 (7–13–0)
February 27	8:30 pm	at #1 Michigan State		Munn Ice Arena • East Lansing, Michigan	BTN	Eberly	W 5–1	6,555	12–18–1 (8–13–0)
February 28	8:00 pm	at #1 Michigan State		Munn Ice Arena • East Lansing, Michigan	BTN	Eberly	T 3–3 ^{SOL}	6,555	12–18–2 (8–13–1)
March 5	6:30 pm	Notre Dame		Value City Arena • Columbus, Ohio		Eberly	L 4–5 ^{OT}	6,852	12–19–2 (8–14–1)
March 6	6:30 pm	Notre Dame		Value City Arena • Columbus, Ohio		Hillebrandt	L 3–4 ^{OT}	5,989	12–20–2 (8–15–1)
Big Ten Tournament
March 11	8:00 pm	at #10т Wisconsin*		Kohl Center • Madison, Wisconsin (Quarterfinal)	B1G+	Eberly	W 7–1	11,297	13–20–2
March 14	7:30 pm	at #3 Michigan State*		Munn Ice Arena • East Lansing, Michigan (Semifinal)	BTN	Eberly	W 3–2 ^{OT}	6,555	14–20–2
March 21	8:00 pm	at #1 Michigan	#19	Yost Ice Arena • Ann Arbor, Michigan (Championship)	BTN				
*Non-conference game. ^{#}Rankings from USCHO.com Poll. All times are in Eastern Time. Source:

== Rankings ==
Poll	Week																											
Poll	Pre	1	2	3	4	5	6	7	8	9	10	11	12	13	14	15	16	17	18	19	20	21	22	23	24	25	26	27 (Final)
USCHO.com	16	16	16	14	17	19	RV	RV	RV	NR	NR	NR	–	NR	NR	NR	NR	NR	NR	NR	NR	NR	RV	NR	19	RV		
USA Hockey	17	16т	15	15	17	RV	RV	RV	RV	RV	NR	NR	–	NR	NR	NR	NR	NR	NR	NR	NR	NR	NR	NR	19	RV		

Note: USCHO did not release a poll in week 12.
Note: USA Hockey did not release a poll in week 12.
