= 2026 Big Ten men's ice hockey tournament =

American college hockey tournament

- Dates: March 11–21, 2026
- Teams: 7
- Finals site: Yost Ice Arena; Ann Arbor, Michigan
- Champions: Michigan (4th title)
- Winning coach: Brandon Naurato (2nd title)
- MVP: T. J. Hughes (Michigan)
- Big Ten men's Ice Hockey Tournaments

The 2026 Big Ten Conference men's ice hockey tournament was the thirteenth tournament in conference history. It was played between March 11 and March 21, 2025, on-campus locations. As the tournament winner, Michigan earned the Big Ten's automatic bid to the 2026 NCAA Division I men's ice hockey tournament.

== Format ==
As announced in 2025, the tournament featured a new format with single-elimination quarterfinals, for which all games would take place on the campus of the higher-seeded team, which would have the #2, #3, and #4 seed host while the top-seeded seed had a bye the single-elimination semifinals. The second, third and fourth-seeded teams would each host a series. The highest-seeded team remaining after the semifinals would host the championship game.

== Conference standings ==
2025–26 Big Ten ice hockey Standings
	Conference record										Overall record					
	GP	W	L	T	OTW	OTL	3/SW	PTS	GF	GA	GP	W	L	T	GF	GA
#5 Michigan State †	24	16	6	2	2	2	1	51	88	54	37	26	9	2	136	79
#3 Michigan *	24	17	6	1	4	0	1	49	96	66	40	31	8	1	181	96
#11 Penn State	24	12	10	2	1	3	1	41	86	82	37	21	14	2	136	117
#2 Wisconsin	24	14	10	0	3	0	0	39	95	84	39	24	13	2	142	115
Ohio State	24	8	15	1	1	5	0	29	78	100	37	14	21	2	119	134
Minnesota	24	7	15	2	0	2	2	27	61	79	36	11	22	3	97	125
Notre Dame	24	5	17	2	3	2	0	12	65	104	37	9	23	5	103	151
Championship: March 21, 2026 † indicates conference regular season champion * indicates conference tournament champion Rankings: USCHO.com Top 20 Poll; updated April 15, 2026

== Bracket ==
Quarterfinals; March 11
2	Michigan	6
7	Notre Dame	1
(Teams are reseeded after the Quarterfinal round)
3	Penn State	6
6	Minnesota	2
4	Wisconsin	1
5	Ohio State	7

Semifinals; March 14
1	Michigan State	2
5	Ohio State	3*
2	Michigan	5
3	Penn State	2

Championship; March 21
5	Ohio State	3
2	Michigan	7

Note: * denotes overtime periods.

== Results ==
=== Quarterfinals ===
==== (2) Michigan vs. (7) Notre Dame ====
March 11	Notre Dame	1 – 6	Michigan	Yost Ice Arena	Recap
No scoring		First period	11:52 – Jayden Perron – (Michael Hage, Luca Fantilli)
No scoring		Second period	4:53 – Josh Eernisse – (Garrett Schifsky, Kienan Draper); 15:14 – pp – Jayden Perron – (Michael Hage, T. J. Hughes)
Evan Werner – (Danny Nelson) – 15:49		Third period	14:31 – pp – Will Horcoff – (Michael Hage, Malcolm Spence); 17:15 – en – Tyler Duke – (Luca Fantilli, Michael Hage); 19:13 – Kason Muscutt – (Asher Barnett, Aidan Park)
Nicholas Kempf (29 saves / 34 shots)		Goalie stats	Jack Ivankovic (23 saves / 24 shots)

==== (3) Penn State vs. (6) Minnesota ====
March 11	Minnesota	2 – 6	Penn State	Pegula Ice Arena	Recap
No scoring		First period	3:10 – Charlie Cerrato – (JJ Wiebusch, Matt DiMarsico); 13:18 – Mac Gadowsky – (Gavin McKenna, Aiden Fink)
Javon Moore – (Unassisted) – 16:34		Second period	7:56 – Matt DiMarsico – (Jarod Crespo, Jackson Smith); 9:40 – Reese Laubach – (Jarod Crespo, Aiden Fink)
Jacob Rombach – (Beckett Hendrickson, Erik Påhlsson) – 15:06		Third period	7:56 – Aiden Fink – (Gavin McKenna, Reese Laubach); 18:20 – en – Cade Christenson – (Nicholas Chin-DeGraves, Lev Katzin)
Luca Di Pasquo (34 saves / 39 shots)		Goalie stats	Joshua Fleming (27 saves / 29 shots)

==== (4) Wisconsin vs. (5) Ohio State ====
March 11	Ohio State	7 – 1	Wisconsin	Kohl Center	Recap
Nathan Lewis – (Sam Deckhut, Ethan Straky) – 5:01		First period	No scoring
Felix Caron – (Riley Thompson) – 2:06; Jake Karabela – (Davis Burnside) – 17:30		Second period	No scoring
Broten Sabo – (Jake Karabela, Riley Thompson) – pp – 0:25; Adam Eisele – (William Smith, Bryce Ingles) – 6:42; Max Montes – (Adam Eisele, William Smith) – pp – 9:38; Riley Thompson – (Broten Sabo, Davis Burnside) – pp – 10:23		Third period	12:29 – sh – Finn Brink – (Gavin Morrissey, Joe Palodichuk)
Kristoffer Eberly (33 saves / 34 shots)		Goalie stats	Daniel Hauser (12 saves / 17 shots); Eli Pulver (1 save / 3 shots)

=== Semifinals ===
==== (1) Michigan State vs. (5) Ohio State ====
March 14	Ohio State	3 – 2	OT	Michigan State	Munn Ice Arena	Recap
Riley Thompson – (Jake Karabela) – 9:03		First period		1:56 – Shane Vansaghi – (Gavin O'Connell)
Jake Karabela – (Broten Sabo, Davis Burnside) – pp – 1:33		Second period		17:29 – pp – Porter Martone – (Daniel Russell, Ryker Lee)
No scoring		Third period		No scoring
Felix Caron – (Jake Karabela, William Smith) – 2:36		First overtime period		No scoring
Kristoffer Eberly (36 saves / 38 shots)		Goalie stats		Trey Augustine (28 saves / 31 shots)

==== (2) Michigan vs. (3) Penn State ====
March 14	Penn State	2 – 5	Michigan	Yost Ice Arena	Recap
Gavin McKenna – (Luke Misa, Mac Gadowsky) – 18:59		First period	16:28 – Kienan Draper – (Garrett Schifsky, Josh Eernisse)
No scoring		Second period	6:57 – sh – Garrett Schifsky – (Nick Moldenhauer); 12:14 – Cole McKinney – (Nick Moldenhauer)
Lev Katzin – (Jackson Smith, Charlie Cerrato) – 6:09		Third period	12:02 – pp – Michael Hage – (Jayden Perron, T. J. Hughes); 19:30 – en – T. J. Hughes– (Cole McKinney)
Joshua Fleming (34 saves / 38 shots)		Goalie stats	Jack Ivankovic (27 saves / 29 shots)

=== Championship ===
==== (2) Michigan vs. (5) Ohio State ====
March 21	Ohio State	3 – 7	Michigan	Yost Ice Arena	Recap
William Smith – (Bryce Ingles, Ryan Gordon) – pp – 8:18		First period	17:49 – Garrett Schifsky – (Ben Robertson, Drew Schock)
Jake Karabela – (Felix Caron) – 9:12; Adma Eisele – (Ryan Gordon, Max Montes) – pp – 16:31		Second period	1:50 – Will Horcoff – (Michael Hage, Malcolm Spence); 19:17 – Malcolm Spence – (T. J. Hughes, Dakoda Rheaume-Mullen)
No scoring		Third period	8:19 – T. J. Hughes – (Jayden Perron); 9:44 – pp – Jayden Perron – (T. J. Hughes); 12:43 – Luca Fantilli – (Garrett Schifsky, Kienan Draper); 17:58 – en – Nick Moldenhauer – (Unassisted)
Kristoffer Eberly (22 saves / 28 shots)		Goalie stats	Jack Ivankovic (25 saves / 28 shots)

== Tournament awards ==
=== All-Tournament Team ===
- G: Jack Ivankovic (Michigan)
- D: Luca Fantilli (Michigan)
- D: William Smith (Ohio State)
- F: T. J. Hughes *(Michigan)
- F: Jake Karabela (Ohio State)
- F: Jayden Perron (Michigan)

* Most Outstanding Player
