= 2025–26 Penn State Nittany Lions men's ice hockey season =

NCAA Tournament, L 1-3 VS. UMD
- Conference: Big Ten
- Home ice: Pegula Ice Arena

Rankings
- USCHO: #10
- USA Hockey: #9

Record
- Overall: 21–14–2
- Conference: 12–10–2
- Home: 12–6–0
- Road: 9–7–2
- Neutral: 0–1–0

Coaches and captains
- Head coach: Guy Gadowsky
- Assistant coaches: Juliano Pagliero; Andrew Sturtz; Vince Pedrie
- Captain: Dane Dowiak
- Alternate captain: Jarod Crespo

The 2025–26 Penn State Nittany Lions men's ice hockey season was the 20th season of play for the program and 13th in the Big Ten Conference. The Nittany Lions represented Penn State University in the 2025–26 NCAA Division I men's ice hockey season, played their home games at Pegula Ice Arena and were coached by Guy Gadowsky in his 14th season.

== Season ==
Gavin McKenna (at center-point of photograph) in action for the Nittany Lions during January 23 game against the Wisconsin Badgers at the Kohl Center

After the program reached the Frozen Four for the first time, the Nittany Lions obtained the news that Gavin McKenna, the #1 prospect of the 2026 NHL entry draft, committed himself to Penn State University. Penn State University were the first to have a hockey player transfer from the Canadian Hockey League in over 50 years, because the NCAA allowed former Canadian major-junior players to play varsity ice hockey.

== Departures ==
Player	Position	Nationality	Cause
Jimmy Dowd Jr.	Defenseman	United States	Graduation (signed with Adirondack Thunder)
Carson Dyck	Forward	Canada	Graduation (retired)
Danny Dzhaniyev	Forward	United States	Graduation (retired)
Jason Gallucci	Defenseman	United States	Transferred to Canisius
Noah Grannan	Goaltender	United States	Left program (retired)
Dylan Lugris	Forward	United States	Graduation (signed with Jokers de Cergy-Pontoise)
Simon Mack	Defenseman	Canada	Graduation (signed with Calgary Wranglers)
Tyler Paquette	Forward	United States	Graduation (signed with Wheeling Nailers)
Arsenii Sergeev	Goaltender	Russia	Signed professional contract (Calgary Flames)

== Recruiting ==
Player	Position	Nationality	Age	Notes
Nolan Collins	Defenseman	Canada	21	Whitby, ON; selected 167th overall in 2022
Josh Fleming	Goaltender	Canada	20	Montréal, QC
Mac Gadowsky	Defenseman	United States	23	Fairbanks, AK; transfer from Army
Lev Katzin	Forward	Canada	18	Thornhill, ON
Gavin McKenna	Forward	Canada	17	Whitehorse, YT
Luke Misa	Forward	Canada	19	Oakville, ON; selected 150 overall in 2024
Kevin Reidler	Goaltender	Sweden	21	Gävle, SWE; transfer from Omaha; selected 151st overall in 2022
Jackson Smith	Defenseman	Canada	18	Calgary, AB; selected 14th overall in 2025
Shea Van Olm	Forward	Canada	21	Calgary, AB

== Roster ==
As of August 16, 2025.

No.	Nat.	Player	Class	Pos	Height	Weight	DoB	Hometown	Previous team	NHL rights
2	(United States)	Carter Schade	Senior	D	5' 11" (1.8 m)	185 lb (84 kg)	2003-03-07	Mars, Pennsylvania	Lincoln Stars (USHL)	—
3	(United States)	Casey Aman	Junior	D	6' 0" (1.83 m)	185 lb (84 kg)	2003-01-15	Johnstown, Pennsylvania	Powell River Kings (BCHL)	—
4	(United States)	Mac Gadowsky	Junior	D	6' 3" (1.91 m)	185 lb (84 kg)	2002-01-10	Fairbanks, Alaska	Army (AHA)	—
7	(Canada)	Jackson Smith	Freshman	D	6' 4" (1.93 m)	198 lb (90 kg)	2007-05-13	Calgary, Alberta	Tri-City Americans (WHL)	CBJ, 14th overall 2025
8	(United States)	Alex Servagno	Senior	F	5' 9" (1.75 m)	170 lb (77 kg)	2002-06-16	Gibsonia, Pennsylvania	Green Bay Gamblers (USHL)	—
9	(United States)	Keaton Peters	Sophomore	F	5' 10" (1.78 m)	187 lb (85 kg)	2004-05-01	Sussex, Wisconsin	Lincoln Stars (USHL)	—
10	(United States)	Nick Fascia	Sophomore	D	6' 1" (1.85 m)	183 lb (83 kg)	2005-04-28	Blackwood, New Jersey	Waterloo Black Hawks (USHL)	—
11	(Canada)	Luke Misa	Freshman	F	5' 10" (1.78 m)	180 lb (82 kg)	2005-11-25	Oakville, Ontario	Brampton Steelheads (OHL)	CGY, 150th overall 2024
12	(United States)	Ben Schoen	Senior (RS)	F	5' 8" (1.73 m)	150 lb (68 kg)	2002-05-18	Maumee, Ohio	Tri-City Storm (USHL)	—
14	(United States)	Matt DiMarsico	Junior	F	6' 0" (1.83 m)	180 lb (82 kg)	2004-01-07	Wexford, Pennsylvania	Green Bay Gamblers (USHL)	—
15	(United States)	Charlie Cerrato	Sophomore	F	6' 0" (1.83 m)	190 lb (86 kg)	2005-03-10	Fallston, Maryland	Youngstown Phantoms (USHL)	CAR, 49th overall 2025
18	(Canada)	Aiden Fink	Junior	F	5' 10" (1.78 m)	160 lb (73 kg)	2004-11-24	Calgary, Alberta	Brooks Bandits (AJHL)	NSH, 218th overall 2023
19	(United States)	Dane Dowiak (C)	Junior	F	5' 10" (1.78 m)	180 lb (82 kg)	2002-03-27	Pittsburgh, Pennsylvania	Tri-City Storm (USHL)	—
21	(United States)	Braedon Ford	Sophomore	F	5' 9" (1.75 m)	168 lb (76 kg)	2004-01-19	Pittsburgh, Pennsylvania	Des Moines Buccaneers (USHL)	—
24	(United States)	Jarod Crespo (A)	Senior	D	6' 0" (1.83 m)	190 lb (86 kg)	2002-04-30	Seven Lakes, North Carolina	Green Bay Gamblers (USHL)	—
27	(Canada)	Cade Christenson	Sophomore	D	6' 3" (1.91 m)	183 lb (83 kg)	2004-11-02	Edmonton, Alberta	Sherwood Park Crusaders (BCHL)	—
29	(United States)	Reese Laubach	Junior	F	6' 0" (1.83 m)	170 lb (77 kg)	2003-11-20	San Jose, California	Omaha Lancers (USHL)	SJS, 217th overall 2022
30	(United States)	John Seifarth	Senior	G	6' 3" (1.91 m)	195 lb (88 kg)	2003-11-13	Pittsburgh, Pennsylvania	Avonworth High School (USHS–PA)	—
33	(Canada)	Lev Katzin	Freshman	F	5' 8" (1.73 m)	176 lb (80 kg)	2007-05-13	Thornhill, Ontario	Guelph Storm (OHL)	—
34	(Canada)	Josh Fleming	Freshman	G	6' 2" (1.88 m)	172 lb (78 kg)	2004-11-10	Montréal, Quebec	Acadie-Bathurst Titan (QMJHL)	—
35	(Sweden)	Kevin Reidler	Sophomore	G	6' 6" (1.98 m)	203 lb (92 kg)	2004-09-02	Gävle, Sweden	Omaha (NCHC)	OTT, 151st overall 2022
71	(Canada)	Nic Chin-DeGraves	Sophomore	F	6' 0" (1.83 m)	172 lb (78 kg)	2003-05-19	Edmonton, Alberta	Brooks Bandits (BCHL)	—
72	(Canada)	Gavin McKenna	Freshman	F	6' 0" (1.83 m)	165 lb (75 kg)	2007-12-20	Whitehorse, Yukon	Medicine Hat Tigers (WHL)	—
77	(Canada)	Nolan Collins	Freshman	D	6' 4" (1.93 m)	216 lb (98 kg)	2004-04-28	Whitby, Ontario	Flint Firebirds (OHL)	PIT, 167th overall 2022
86	(United States)	J. J. Wiebusch	Sophomore	F	6' 0" (1.83 m)	172 lb (78 kg)	2004-02-20	River Falls, Wisconsin	Sioux Falls Stampede (USHL)	—
91	(United States)	Andrew Kuzma	Freshman (RS)	F	6' 0" (1.83 m)	194 lb (88 kg)	2005-01-29	New York, New York	Madison Capitols (USHL)	—
93	(Canada)	Shea Van Olm	Freshman	F	6' 1" (1.85 m)	198 lb (90 kg)	2004-03-05	Calgary, Alberta	Spokane Chiefs (WHL)	—

== Standings ==
2025–26 Big Ten ice hockey Standings
	Conference record										Overall record					
	GP	W	L	T	OTW	OTL	3/SW	PTS	GF	GA	GP	W	L	T	GF	GA
#5 Michigan State †	24	16	6	2	2	2	1	51	88	54	37	26	9	2	136	79
#3 Michigan *	24	17	6	1	4	0	1	49	96	66	40	31	8	1	181	96
#11 Penn State	24	12	10	2	1	3	1	41	86	82	37	21	14	2	136	117
#2 Wisconsin	24	14	10	0	3	0	0	39	95	84	39	24	13	2	142	115
Ohio State	24	8	15	1	1	5	0	29	78	100	37	14	21	2	119	134
Minnesota	24	7	15	2	0	2	2	27	61	79	36	11	22	3	97	125
Notre Dame	24	5	17	2	3	2	0	12	65	104	37	9	23	5	103	151
Championship: March 21, 2026 † indicates conference regular season champion * indicates conference tournament champion Rankings: USCHO.com Top 20 Poll; updated April 15, 2026

== Schedule and results ==
Date	Time	Opponent^{#}	Rank^{#}	Site	TV	Decision	Result	Attendance	Record
Regular season
October 3	9:00 pm	at #14 Arizona State*	#5	Mullett Arena • Tempe, Arizona	NHL Network	Reidler	W 6–3	5,270	1–0–0
October 4	7:00 pm	at #14 Arizona State*	#5	Mullett Arena • Tempe, Arizona	NHL Network	Reidler	W 4–2	5,247	2–0–0
October 9	6:30 pm	Clarkson*	#4	Pegula Ice Arena • University Park, Pennsylvania	BTN	Reidler	L 4–6	6,249	2–1–0
October 10	7:00 pm	Clarkson*	#4	Pegula Ice Arena • University Park, Pennsylvania	B1G+	Fleming	W 5–2	6,441	3–1–0
October 17	7:30 pm	Long Island*	#6	Pegula Ice Arena • University Park, Pennsylvania	B1G+	Reidler	W 5–4 ^{OT}	6,449	4–1–0
October 18	6:00 pm	Long Island*	#6	Pegula Ice Arena • University Park, Pennsylvania	B1G+	Fleming	W 3–0	6,428	5–1–0
October 24	7:00 pm	Stonehill*	#5	Pegula Ice Arena • University Park, Pennsylvania	B1G+	Fleming	W 3–2	6,206	6–1–0
October 25	6:00 pm	Stonehill*	#5	Pegula Ice Arena • University Park, Pennsylvania	B1G+	Reidler	W 4–2	6,370	7–1–0
October 30	6:30 pm	at #17 Ohio State	#4	Value City Arena • Columbus, Ohio	BTN	Reidler	W 3–2	3,709	8–1–0 (1–0–0)
October 31	6:30 pm	at #17 Ohio State	#4	Value City Arena • Columbus, Ohio	B1G+	Fleming	W 4–3	4,986	9–1–0 (2–0–0)
November 7	7:00 pm	at #1 Michigan State	#3	Munn Ice Arena • East Lansing, Michigan	B1G+	Reidler	L 1–2 ^{OT}	6,555	9–2–0 (2–1–0)
November 8	4:00 pm	at #1 Michigan State	#3	Munn Ice Arena • East Lansing, Michigan	B1G+	Fleming	L 0–5	6,555	9–3–0 (2–2–0)
November 14	7:00 pm	#2 Michigan	#5	Pegula Ice Arena • University Park, Pennsylvania	B1G+	Reidler	L 1–7	6,549	9–4–0 (2–3–0)
November 15	6:00 pm	#2 Michigan	#5	Pegula Ice Arena • University Park, Pennsylvania	B1G+	Fleming	W 4–2	6,584	10–4–0 (3–3–0)
November 21	8:00 pm	at Minnesota	#5	3M Arena at Mariucci • Minneapolis, Minnesota	FS1, TSN2	Fleming	L 2–3	9,094	10–5–0 (3–4–0)
November 22	8:00 pm	at Minnesota	#5	3M Arena at Mariucci • Minneapolis, Minnesota	B1G+, Fox9+	Reidler	W 2–1	9,336	11–5–0 (4–4–0)
January 2	7:05 pm	at RIT*	#8	Gene Polisseni Center • Henrietta, New York	FloHockey	Fleming	L 0–1	4,233	11–6–0
January 4	5:00 pm	RIT*	#8	Pegula Ice Arena • University Park, Pennsylvania	B1G+	Reidler	W 7–3	6,269	12–6–0
January 9	7:00 pm	Minnesota	#9	Pegula Ice Arena • University Park, Pennsylvania	BTN	Fleming	W 3–0	6,192	13–6–0 (5–4–0)
January 10	7:00 pm	Minnesota	#9	Pegula Ice Arena • University Park, Pennsylvania	BTN	Reidler	W 5–2	6,334	14–6–0 (6–4–0)
January 16	7:00 pm	Notre Dame	#8	Pegula Ice Arena • University Park, Pennsylvania	B1G+	Fleming	W 4–1	6,455	15–6–0 (7–4–0)
January 17	8:00 pm	Notre Dame	#8	Pegula Ice Arena • University Park, Pennsylvania	BTN	Reidler	W 6–3	6,449	16–6–0 (8–4–0)
January 23	7:00 pm	at #5 Wisconsin	#8	Kohl Center • Madison, Wisconsin	B1G+	Fleming	W 7–2	10,187	17–6–0 (9–4–0)
January 24	8:30 pm	at #5 Wisconsin	#8	Kohl Center • Madison, Wisconsin	BTN	Reidler	W 3–1	13,355	18–6–0 (10–4–0)
January 30	6:00 pm	#2 Michigan State	#5	Pegula Ice Arena • University Park, Pennsylvania	BTN	Fleming	L 3–6	6,591	18–7–0 (10–5–0)
January 31	1:00 pm	#2 Michigan State	#5	Beaver Stadium • University Park, Pennsylvania	BTN	Reidler	L 4–5 ^{OT}	74,575	18–8–0 (10–6–0)
February 13	6:30 pm	at #2 Michigan	#6	Yost Ice Arena • Ann Arbor, Michigan	B1G+	Fleming	T 4–4 ^{SOL}	5,800	18–8–1 (10–6–1)
February 14	5:00 pm	at #2 Michigan	#6	Yost Ice Arena • Ann Arbor, Michigan	BTN	Reidler	L 3–6	5,800	18–9–1 (10–7–1)
February 20	8:30 pm	Ohio State	#6	Pegula Ice Arena • University Park, Pennsylvania	BTN	Fleming	W 11–4	6,486	19–9–1 (11–7–1)
February 21	8:00 pm	Ohio State	#6	Pegula Ice Arena • University Park, Pennsylvania	BTN	Reidler	W 5–4 ^{OT}	6,515	20–9–1 (12–7–1)
February 27	7:00 pm	at Notre Dame	#5	Compton Family Ice Arena • Notre Dame, Indiana	Peacock, TSN	Fleming	T 3–3 ^{SOW}	5,192	20–9–2 (12–7–2)
February 28	6:00 pm	at Notre Dame	#5	Compton Family Ice Arena • Notre Dame, Indiana	Peacock	Reidler	L 3–4 ^{OT}	5,089	20–10–2 (12–8–2)
March 5	7:00 pm	#11 Wisconsin	#6	Pegula Ice Arena • University Park, Pennsylvania	B1G+	Fleming	L 3–7	6,490	20–11–2 (12–9–2)
March 6	7:00 pm	#11 Wisconsin	#6	Pegula Ice Arena • University Park, Pennsylvania	B1G+	Reidler	L 2–5	6,494	20–12–2 (12–10–2)
Big Ten Tournament
March 11	7:00 pm	Minnesota*	#10т	Pegula Ice Arena • University Park, Pennsylvania (Quarterfinal)	B1G+	Fleming	W 6–2	4,938	21–12–2
March 14	5:00 pm	at #1 Michigan*	#10т	Yost Ice Arena • Ann Arbor, Michigan (Semifinal)	BTN	Fleming	L 2–5	5,800	21–13–2
NCAA Tournament
March 26	9:00 pm	vs. #6 Minnesota Duluth*	#10	MVP Arena • Albany, New York (Regional Semifinal)	ESPN2	Fleming	L 1–3	5,237	21–14–2
*Non-conference game. ^{#}Rankings from USCHO.com Poll. All times are in Eastern Time. Source:

== Rankings ==
Poll	Week																											
Poll	Pre	1	2	3	4	5	6	7	8	9	10	11	12	13	14	15	16	17	18	19	20	21	22	23	24	25	26	27 (Final)
USCHO.com	5 (3)	4 (4)	6 (1)	5	4 (2)	3 (3)	5	5	9	9	9	9	–	8	9	8	8	5	6	6	6	5	6	10т	10т	10		
USA Hockey	5 (1)	4 (2)	6	5 (1)	4	3	5	5	9	9	9	9	–	9	9	8	8	5	6	7	6	5	6	10	11	9		

Note: USCHO did not release a poll in week 12.
Note: USA Hockey did not release a poll in week 12.
