= 2025–26 Michigan State Spartans men's ice hockey season =

Big Ten, Champion Great Lakes Invitational, Champion NCAA Tournament, Regional Final
- Conference: Big Ten
- Home ice: Munn Ice Arena

Rankings
- USCHO: #3
- USA Hockey: #3

Record
- Overall: 26–9–2
- Conference: 16–6–2
- Home: 9–6–1
- Road: 13–2–1
- Neutral: 4–1–0

Coaches and captains
- Head coach: Adam Nightingale
- Assistant coaches: Jared DeMichiel; Mike Towns; Brad Fast
- Captain: Matt Basgall
- Alternate captain(s): Patrick Geary; Travis Shoudy; Charlie Stramel

The 2025–26 Michigan State Spartans men's ice hockey season was the 84th season of play for the program and 35th in the Big Ten. The Spartans representeed Michigan State University in the 2025–26 NCAA Division I men's ice hockey season, played their home games at the Munn Ice Arena and were coached by Adam Nightingale in his fourth season.

On January 19, 2026, director of hockey operations for the team and former Spartan player Dan Sturges died suddenly. It was announced that the team would wear a jersey patch in his honor of the remainder of the season.

With a win over Minnesota on March 5, the Spartans secured their third straight Big Ten regular season championship. They lost their first game of the Big Ten tournament before receiving a No. 1 seed to the NCAA tournament for the second consecutive season. However, they failed to advance further, losing to Wisconsin two days later. They finished the season 26–9–2, 16–6–2 in Big Ten play.

== Offseason ==
=== Departures ===
Player	Position	Nationality	Cause
Nicklas Andrews	Defenseman	United States	Graduation (signed with Toledo Walleye)
Mikey DeAngelo	Forward	United States	Transferred to Massachusetts
Luca Di Pasquo	Goaltender	United States	Transferred to Minnesota
Karsen Dorwart	Forward	United States	Signed professional contract (Philadelphia Flyers)
David Gucciardi	Defenseman	Canada	Signed professional contract (Washington Capitals)
Isaac Howard	Forward	United States	Signed professional contract (Edmonton Oilers)
Tanner Kelly	Forward	United States	Graduation (signed with Toledo Walleye)
Joey Larson	Forward	United States	Signed professional contract (New York Islanders)
Vladislav Lukashevich	Defenseman	Russia	Transferred to Miami
Kaden Nelson	Forward	United States	Transferred to Oklahoma State
Austin Oravetz	Defenseman	United States	Transferred to Merrimack
Red Savage	Forward	United States	Graduation (signed with Rochester Americans)

=== Recruiting and incoming transfers ===
Player	Position	Nationality	Age	Notes
Austin Baker	Forward	United States	19	White Lake Township, MI; selected 203rd overall in 2024
Sean Barnhill	Defenseman	United States	18	Scottsdale, AZ; selected 70th overall in 2025
Cole Burke	Forward	United States	21	Trenton, MI
Matt Lahey	Defenseman	Canada	19	Victoria, BC; selected 200th overall in 2024
Ryker Lee	Forward	United States	18	Wilmette, IL; selected 26th overall in 2025
Cayden Lindstrom	Forward	Canada	19	Chetwynd, BC; selected 4th overall in 2024
Porter Martone	Forward	Canada	18	Peterborough, ON; selected 6th overall in 2025
Eric Nilson	Forward	Sweden	18	Calgary, AB; selected 45th overall in 2025
Colin Ralph	Defenseman	United States	19	Maple Grove, MN; transfer from St. Cloud State; selected 48th overall in 2024
Anthony Romani	Forward	Canada	20	Pickering, ON; selected 162nd overall in 2024
Travis Shoudy	Defenseman	United States	23	Marysville, MI; transfer from Ferris State
Melvin Strahl	Goaltender	Sweden	20	Sollefteå, SWE; selected 156th overall in 2023
Cole Ward	Defenseman	United States	19	Rochester Hills, MI

== Season summary ==
=== Exhibition ===
The Spartans were ranked No. 3 in the preseason polls and received several first place votes in each poll. The Spartans played an exhibition game against Windsor on October 3, 2025. . Four different MSU players scored a goal while Trey Augustine and Melvin Strahl combined to hold Windsor scoreless as the Spartans won the game easily 4–0.

=== Regular season ===
==== New Hampshire ====
MSU began the regular season welcoming New Hampshire to Munn Arena on October 9 and 10 as the consensus No. 2 team in the country. In game one against the Wildcats, the Spartans fell behind 2–1 early in the second period before Charlie Stramel tied the game with just under eight minutes remaining the period. The Wildcats retook the lead on a power play goal in the third before the Spartans tied it with a goal by Tommi Männistö with less than four minutes left in regulation. However, the Wildcats put in a rebound past Trey Augustine with 5.2 seconds left in the game to shock the Spartans 4–3. In game two, neither team scored in the first before Matt Basgall scored to give the Spartans a 1–0 lead in the second. Patrick Geary added a goal in the third as Augustine shut out the Wildcats 2–0.

==== Boston University ====
The following week, the Spartans, now ranked No. 3, travelled to face No. 1-ranked Boston University. MSU struck early taking a two-goal lead on a power play goal by Stramel and a short-handed goal two minutes later by Eric Nilson. Following a Terriers power play goal later in the first, the Spartans stretched the lead back to two with a goal with less than five minutes left in the period. Following a scoreless second, Michigan State took a three-goal lead less than two minutes into the third. A BU power play goal with a minute left narrowed the lead to 4–2, but MSU held on for the win. In game two against the Terriers, MSU again took a 2–0 lead through two periods. After BU scored less than three minutes into the third, Männistö added his second goal of the season just 39 seconds later to push the lead to 3–1. However, the Terriers mounted a furious comeback, scoring a short-handed goal with less than seven minutes left in the third and tying the game at 15:02 of the third. In overtime, Basgall notched in the winning goal after a Terrier shot was stopped by Shane Vansgahi just short of crossing the goal line to give MSU the 4–3 win.

==== Northern Michigan ====
Following the sweep of No. 1 BU, the Spartans moved to No. 1 the following week.

The Spartans travelled to face Northern Michigan on October 24 and 25. In game one, the Spartans shut out the Wildcats 4–0. Maxim Strbák had two assists in the game while four different Spartans notched a goal in the win. In game two, MSU won again, beating NMU 6–2. Tommi Männistö scored two goals in the game as the Spartans earned the sweep over Northern Michigan.

==== Penn State ====
After an off week, the Spartans, still ranked No. 1 in the country, faced No. 3-ranked Penn State at Munn Arena on November 7 and 8. In game one, Anthony Romani gave the Spartans the lead 17 minutes in. However, the Nittany Lions tied it in the second, beating Trey Augustine on a deflected shot. Going to overtime, Tiernan Shoudy scored the game winner as MSU won 2–1. In game two, the Spartans finished off the sweep, routing PSU 5–0. Augustine stopped all 36 Lion shots while Charlie Srtamel scored two goals and had two assists in the win. Daniel Russel added three assists as MSU won easily.

==== Notre Dame ====
The Spartans, now unanimously the No. 1 team in both polls, next traveled to face Notre Dame on November 14 and 15. In game one, Porter Martone scored two goals as the Spartans beat the Irish 4–1. Charlie Stramel and Daniel Russell each had two assists while Maxim Strbak and Ryker Lee also scored for the Spartans. With 54 second remaining in the game, senior goaltender Dolan Gilbert, a South Bend native and the team's third goalie, entered the game in his Spartan debut. In game two, Lee scored 90 seconds in to give MSU the early lead. Martone scored his third goal of the weekend to push the lead to 2–0. An empty net goal gave the Spartans the 3–1 win and sweep of the Irish.

==== Wisconsin ====
The Spartans returned home still the unanimous No. 1 team to face No. 7-ranked Wisconsin. In game one on November 21, the Spartans took an early 2–0 lead on goals by Daniel Russell and Porter Martone before Wisconsin scored four straight to take the lead. The Spartans narrowed the lead to 4–3 with a Ryker Lee goal, but Wisconsin added another to push the lead back to two. Despite a second goal by Martone, the Badgers held on for the 5–4 win. In game two on November 22, the Spartans trailed 1–0 in the third before Martone scored his third goal of the weekend with just 3.8 seconds remaining in regulation. The Badgers completed the sweep with a goal 2:36 into overtime to win 2–1.

==== Colgate ====
Following the sweep by Wisconsin, the now No. 3-ranked Spartans welcomed Colgate to Munn where they swept the Raiders, winning 5–2 and 4–1. Daniel Russell had two goals in the second game while Ryker Lee scored his second of the series. The wins moved the Spartans to 11–3–0 on the season.

==== Michigan ====
The Spartans, still ranked No. 3 in both polls. returned to the ice to play a home-and-home series against No. 1 ranked Michigan on December 5 and 6. In the first game in Ann Arbor, Michigan controlled the game, shutting out the Spartans 3–0. In game two back in East Lansing, the Spartans fell behind 1–0 in the first. However MSU rallied to tie the game on a goal by Anthony Romani with less than two minutes remaining in the second period. Early in the third, Romani again lit the lamp to give the Spartans the 2–1 lead. Trey Augustine held the Spartans scoreless from there and Porter Martone added an empty net goal to give MSU the 3–1 win over the top-ranked Wolverines. The win moved the Spartans to 12–4 overall and 5–3 in conference play.

==== Great Lakes Invitational ====
After three weeks off, the Spartans, still ranked No. 3, travelled to Grand Rapids, Michigan for the Great Lakes Invitational.

===== Ferris State =====
In game one of the tournament on December 28, the Spartans played Ferris State. The Spartans scored quickly, notching two goal less than nine minutes into the game. Two more goals in the second gave MSU a commanded 4–0 lead. The Bulldogs rallied for a goal late in the second and pulled within two early in the third before Charlie Stramel secured the win with a goal with 12 minutes left. The 5–2 win moved MSU to 13–4 on the season.

===== Michigan Tech =====
In the championship game of the GLI, MSU defeated Michigan Tech 4–1. Charlie Stramel scored twice, his third and fourth of the tournament, and the Spartans added an empty net goal to win the tournament championship for the second consecutive season. Stramel was named tournament MVP and was the Spartans 14th tournament title. The win moved the Spartans to 14–4 on the season.

=== Exhibition ===
The Spartans returned home to face the USA Hockey National Development Under-18 Team in an exhibition game on January 4, 2026. MSU took an early lead before the development team tied it midway through the first. Goals by Anthony Romani and Cayden Lindstrom gave MSU a 3–1 lead. A Charlie Stramel goal less than five minutes into the third pushed the lead to three. The US team pulled within three with a goal with less than three minutes remaining as MSU held on for a 5–2 win.

=== Regular season ===
==== Ohio State ====
MSU, now ranked No. 2 in the nation, will return to Big Ten action on January 9 and 10 by visiting Ohio State. In game one, the Spartans jumped on the Buckeyes, scoring four goals in the first period, two by Porter Martone. Ohio State narrowed the lead to 4–2 with a goal in the second and another early in the third. However, Charlie Stramel scored a power play goal four minutes in to the third as MSU won easily 6–2. The next day, neither team scored in the first before Ohio State took the lead 2:53 into the second. Porter Martone scored his third goal of the series to tie it at two with 10 minutes left in the period. However, OSU scored 8:01 into the third and held the Spartans off for a 2–1 win. The loss dropped MSU to 15–5 and 6–4 in conference.

==== Wisconsin ====
Dropping to No. 4 in the country, the Spartans travelled to face No. 2 Wisconsin on January 15 and 16. In the first game, Wisconsin tied it early in the second after a Ryker Lee goal had given MSU the 1–0 lead in the first. The Spartans scored three straight goals in the second to take a 4–1 lead. However, the Badgers narrowed the lead to eon with a goal near the end of the second period and si minutes into the third. MSU, however, held UW off for the 4–3 win. On January 16, MSU blew the game open in the first period, taking a 3–0 lead on a goal by Shane Vansaghi and a short-handed and power play goal by Daniel Russell. Michigan State pushed the lead to four with less than five minutes left in the second half. The Badgers finally scored with less than a minute left in the game. The 4–1 victory gave the Spartans the sweep and put MSU at 8–4 in conference and 17–5 overall.

==== Minnesota ====
The Spartans returned home to face unranked Minnesota on January 23 and 24 now ranked No. 2 in the country. Ryker Lee gave the Spartans an early 1–0 lead in the first game while MSU added two more goals to go up by three with 17 minutes left in the game. The Gophers drew within two at 13:50 of the third on a power play goal, but MSU held on for the 3–1 win. There was a minute of silence before the game in honor of Dan Sturges, director of hockey operations for the Spartans, who passed away earlier in the week. MSU players wore a jersey patch and Minnesota players also wore decals on their helmets in his honor. In game two, the Spartan fell behind early before Daniel Russell tied it with a power play goal late in the first. MSU added a goal early in the second and early in the third to take a two-goal lead. Another power play goal for the Gophers brought the score to 3–2 with seven minutes left. However, MSU held on for the win. The win moved MSU to 19–5 overall and 10–4 in conference, one point behind first-place Michigan.

==== Penn State ====
MSU, still ranked No. 2 in the country, travelled to face No. 5 Penn State on January 30 and 31. MSU jumped on the Nittany Lions early, taking a 3–0 lead in the first on two goals by Anthony Romani and a goal by Owen West. Both teams scored in the second as MSU held on to its three-goal lead. PSU drew within a goal with two goals in the first 10 minutes of the third period. However, the Spartans held on from there and added two empty net goals, including Romani's third of the game, to win 6–3. In game two, the teams played outdoors at Beaver Stadium. Daniel Russell scored the only goal of the first period to give the Spartans a 1–0 lead. Penn State tied it and took the lead in the second, but Charlie Stramel's second goal of the period knotted the game up at three entering the third. The Lions again took the lead less than five minutes into the third, but Matt Basgall tied it at 7:38 of the third. In overtime, Stramel completed the hat trick, the second consecutive game with an MSU hat trick, to give MSU the 5–4 win and series sweep.

==== Michigan ====
MSU next travelled to face No. 1 Michigan at Yost Ice Arena on February 6 and then at Little Caesars Arena on February 7. In game one, Charlie Stramel took the lead at 15:!4 of the first period, but the Wolverines tied it less than two minutes later. Goals by Shane Vansaghi and Owen West gave the Spartans a two-goal lead entering the third period. However, Michigan added two goals to tied it and force overtime. Three minutes into overtime, the Wolverines won it 4–3. In game two in Detroit, Michigan State scored the first four goals to take a commanding 4–0 lead early in the second. However, the Wolverines look to rally again, drawing within in two 5:01 into the third. However and empty net goal by Tommi Männistö secured MSU's 5–2 win. The Spartans moved to 22–6, 13–5 on the season.

==== Notre Dame ====
The Spartans, again ranked No. 1 in the country and fresh off a bye week, faced Notre Dame at Munn on February 19 and 20. In game one, the Spartans took the lead 3:07 into the game on a Maxim Strbak goal. The Irish tied it two minutes later before MSU again took the lead early in the second. A power play goal by Charlie Stramel gave MSU the 2–1 lead, but once again Notre Dame tied it two minutes later. Another power play goal, this one by Gavin O'Connell game MSU the one-goal lead again with less than two minutes remaining in the second. In the third, the Spartans held off the Irish and Porter Martone added an empty net goal to secure Spartan win. On February 20, the game was again tied after the first period. However, in the second, the Spartans scored three straight goals, including a short-handed goal by Tommi Mannisto. Notre Dame narrowed the lead to two with a goal 14:18 into the second, but the Spartans answered with four more goals to blow out the Irish 8–2. Porter Martone notched the hat trick in the game while Ryker Lee scored two. With the win, MSU moved to 24–6, 15–5 on the season.

==== Ohio State ====
On February 27, Ohio State visited Munn for two games. In game one, the Buckeyes dominated the Spartans, outshooting the Spartans 39–23 and winning easily 5–1. In game two on February 28, Ryker Lee gave MSU the early lead, but the Buckeyes again took the lead with two goals in just over a minute. Porter Martone evened the score at two with a goal at 17:13 of the first. Ohio State regained the lead with less than three minutes remaining in the second. Still trailing by on in the third, Anthony Romani notched a power play goal at 7:04 to tie the game at three. In overtime, neither team scored and the game went to a shootout. On Senior night, the shootout went 13 rounds before MSU held on for the win. The shootout win moved MSU to 24–7–1 and 15–6–1 on the season.

==== Minnesota ====
With two games remaining, the Spartans traveled to face Minnesota trailing first place Michigan by two points. The Spartans dominated game one on March 5, taking a 5–0 lead through two periods. Ryker Lee and Tiernan Shoudy each scored two goals as MSU won 7–1. The win gave the Spartans the Big Ten championship for the third consecutive season. In the season finale, the Spartans rested Trey Augustine, but still took a 3–1 lead. The Gophers tied it and forced the game to a shootout where Minnesota won the game. The loss dropped MSU to 25–7–2 and 16–6–2 in conference play.

=== Season standings ===
2025–26 Big Ten ice hockey Standings
	Conference record										Overall record					
	GP	W	L	T	OTW	OTL	3/SW	PTS	GF	GA	GP	W	L	T	GF	GA
#5 Michigan State †	24	16	6	2	2	2	1	51	88	54	37	26	9	2	136	79
#3 Michigan *	24	17	6	1	4	0	1	49	96	66	40	31	8	1	181	96
#11 Penn State	24	12	10	2	1	3	1	41	86	82	37	21	14	2	136	117
#2 Wisconsin	24	14	10	0	3	0	0	39	95	84	39	24	13	2	142	115
Ohio State	24	8	15	1	1	5	0	29	78	100	37	14	21	2	119	134
Minnesota	24	7	15	2	0	2	2	27	61	79	36	11	22	3	97	125
Notre Dame	24	5	17	2	3	2	0	12	65	104	37	9	23	5	103	151
Championship: March 21, 2026 † indicates conference regular season champion * indicates conference tournament champion Rankings: USCHO.com Top 20 Poll; updated April 15, 2026

=== Big Ten tournament ===
The Spartans clinched the top seed in the Big Ten tournament, earning a bye to the tournament semifinals. However, MSU, now ranked No. 3 in the country, was upset by Ohio State 3–2 in overtime of the semifinal game.

=== NCAA tournament ===
For the second straight season, the Spartans received a No. 1 seed in the NCAA tournament, No. 3 overall.

==== UConn ====
They played UConn in the Worcester Regional on March 26 at DCU Center. The Spartans were outshot in the game 44–22 and trailed 1–0 with four minutes left in the first period. However, Ryker Lee tied the game with a minute left in the period and Porter Malone gave the Spartans the lead with just over eight minutes left in the second. Trey Augustine made 41 saves as the Spartans held on for the 2–1 win.

==== Wisconsin ====
The Spartans next faced Big Ten rival Wisconsin. The Spartans fell behind early in the second period before Charlie Stramel exited the game with an injury that was later revealed to be a broken ankle. MSU rallied for two goals by Gavin O'Connell and Patrick Geary. Matt Basgill pushed the lead to two less than nine minutes into the third and it seemed like the Spartans would advance easily. However, with just over five minutes left in over time, the Badgers scored two coals in a 34-second span to tie the game at three. In overtime, Wisconsin sent the Spartans home when the only shot of the period beat Trey Augustine 24 seconds in to extra time. The loss ended the Spartans season.

== Roster ==
As of August 28, 2025.

No.	Nat.	Player	Class	Pos	Height	Weight	DoB	Hometown	Previous team	NHL rights
1	(United States)	Trey Augustine	Junior	G	6' 1" (1.85 m)	179 lb (81 kg)	2005-02-23	South Lyon, Michigan	USNTDP (USHL)	DET, 41st overall 2023
2	(United States)	Patrick Geary (A)	Junior	D	6' 1" (1.85 m)	185 lb (84 kg)	2004-02-18	Hamburg, New York	Waterloo Black Hawks (USHL)	BUF, 172nd overall 2024
3	(United States)	Sean Barnhill	Freshman	D	6' 6" (1.98 m)	214 lb (97 kg)	2007-01-08	Scottsdale, Arizona	Dubuque Fighting Saints (USHL)	NYR, 70th overall 2025
4	(United States)	Colin Ralph	Sophomore	D	6' 5" (1.96 m)	227 lb (103 kg)	2005-10-04	Maple Grove, Minnesota	St. Cloud State (NCHC)	STL, 48th overall 2024
5	(United States)	Travis Shoudy (A)	Senior	D	5' 9" (1.75 m)	173 lb (78 kg)	2002-03-15	Marysville, Michigan	Ferris State (CCHA)	—
6	(United States)	Cole Ward	Freshman	D	6' 6" (1.98 m)	209 lb (95 kg)	2005-11-12	Rochester Hills, Michigan	Tri-City Storm (USHL)	—
8	(Slovakia)	Maxim Štrbák	Junior	D	6' 2" (1.88 m)	205 lb (93 kg)	2005-04-13	Košice, Slovakia	Sioux Falls Stampede (USHL)	BUF, 45th overall 2023
9	(United States)	Matt Basgall (C)	Senior	D	5' 9" (1.75 m)	190 lb (86 kg)	2002-08-16	Lake Forest, Illinois	Tri-City Storm (USHL)	—
10	(Finland)	Tommi Männistö	Junior	F	6' 0" (1.83 m)	185 lb (84 kg)	2004-02-07	Riihimäki, Finland	Tappara U20 (U20 SM-sarja)	—
11	(United States)	Owen West	Sophomore	D	5' 11" (1.8 m)	179 lb (81 kg)	2004-06-01	Pittsboro, Indiana	Des Moines Buccaneers (USHL)	—
12	(United States)	Griffin Jurecki	Junior	F	5' 10" (1.78 m)	182 lb (83 kg)	2003-05-03	Grosse Ile, Michigan	Omaha Lancers (USHL)	—
13	(United States)	Tiernan Shoudy	Senior	F	5' 9" (1.75 m)	180 lb (82 kg)	2002-03-15	St. Clair, Michigan	Youngstown Phantoms (USHL)	—
14	(Canada)	Matt Lahey	Freshman	D	6' 6" (1.98 m)	203 lb (92 kg)	2006-07-17	Victoria, British Columbia	Fargo Force (USHL)	TOR, 200th overall 2024
15	(United States)	Charlie Stramel (A)	Senior	F	6' 3" (1.91 m)	215 lb (98 kg)	2004-10-15	Rosemount, Minnesota	Wisconsin (Big Ten)	MIN, 21st overall 2023
18	(United States)	Ryker Lee	Freshman	F	6' 1" (1.85 m)	185 lb (84 kg)	2006-11-08	Wilmette, Illinois	Madison Capitols (USHL)	NSH, 26th overall 2025
19	(United States)	Austin Baker	Freshman	F	6' 0" (1.83 m)	190 lb (86 kg)	2006-02-11	White Lake Township, Michigan	Sioux Falls Stampede (USHL)	DET, 203rd overall 2024
20	(United States)	Daniel Russell	Senior	F	5' 9" (1.75 m)	160 lb (73 kg)	2001-11-16	Traverse City, Michigan	Sioux Falls Stampede (USHL)	—
21	(Canada)	Anthony Romani	Freshman	F	6' 1" (1.85 m)	194 lb (88 kg)	2005-07-12	Pickering, Ontario	Barrie Colts (OHL)	VAN, 162nd overall 2024
22	(Canada)	Porter Martone	Freshman	F	6' 3" (1.91 m)	209 lb (95 kg)	2006-10-26	Peterborough, Ontario	Brampton Steelheads (OHL)	PHI, 6th overall 2025
23	(United States)	Shane Vansaghi	Sophomore	F	6' 2" (1.88 m)	207 lb (94 kg)	2006-10-11	St. Louis, Missouri	USNTDP (USHL)	PHI, 48th overall 2025
24	(Canada)	Nathan Mackie	Sophomore	F	5' 11" (1.8 m)	163 lb (74 kg)	2004-06-03	Prince George, British Columbia	Salmon Arm Silverbacks (BCHL)	—
25	(United States)	Cole Burke	Freshman	F	6' 2" (1.88 m)	181 lb (82 kg)	2004-02-18	Trenton, Michigan	Fairbanks Ice Dogs (NAHL)	—
26	(Sweden)	Eric Nilson	Freshman	F	6' 0" (1.83 m)	165 lb (75 kg)	2007-05-11	Calgary, Alberta	Djurgårdens IF U20 (J20 Nationell)	ANA, 45th overall 2025
28	(Canada)	Cayden Lindstrom	Freshman	F	6' 3" (1.91 m)	220 lb (100 kg)	2006-02-03	Chetwynd, British Columbia	Medicine Hat Tigers (WHL)	CBJ, 4th overall 2024
29	(United States)	Gavin O'Connell	Junior	F	6' 0" (1.83 m)	181 lb (82 kg)	2004-02-19	Wayzata, Minnesota	Waterloo Black Hawks (USHL)	—
30	(United States)	Dolan Gilbert	Senior	G	6' 2" (1.88 m)	174 lb (79 kg)	2001-04-25	South Bend, Indiana	Concordia (NCHA)	—
32	(Sweden)	Melvin Strahl	Freshman	G	6' 3" (1.91 m)	170 lb (77 kg)	2005-03-18	Sollefteå, Sweden	Youngstown Phantoms (USHL)	CBJ, 156th overall 2023

== Schedule and results ==
Date	Time	Opponent^{#}	Rank^{#}	Site	TV	Decision	Result	Attendance	Record
Exhibition
October 3	6:00 pm	Windsor*	#3	Munn Ice Arena • East Lansing, Michigan (Exhibition)		Augustine	W 4–0	6,555	–
Regular season
October 9	7:00 pm	New Hampshire*	#2	Munn Ice Arena • East Lansing, Michigan	B1G+	Augustine	L 3–4	6,555	0–1–0
October 10	7:30 pm	New Hampshire*	#2	Munn Ice Arena • East Lansing, Michigan	B1G+	Augustine	W 2–0	6,555	1–1–0
October 17	6:30 pm	at #1 Boston University*	#3	Agganis Arena • Boston, Massachusetts	ESPN2, TSN5	Augustine	W 4–2	6,148	2–1–0
October 18	7:00 pm	at #1 Boston University*	#3	Agganis Arena • Boston, Massachusetts	ESPN+	Augustine	W 4–3 ^{OT}	7,033	3–1–0
October 24	7:07 pm	at Northern Michigan*	#1	Berry Events Center • Marquette, Michigan	Midco Sports+	Augustine	W 4–0	3,782	4–1–0
October 25	6:07 pm	at Northern Michigan*	#1	Berry Events Center • Marquette, Michigan	Midco Sports+	Strahl	W 6–2	3,698	5–1–0
November 7	7:00 pm	#3 Penn State	#1	Munn Ice Arena • East Lansing, Michigan	B1G+	Augustine	W 2–1 ^{OT}	6,555	6–1–0 (1–0–0)
November 8	4:00 pm	#3 Penn State	#1	Munn Ice Arena • East Lansing, Michigan	B1G+	Augustine	W 5–0	6,555	7–1–0 (2–0–0)
November 14	7:00 pm	at Notre Dame	#1	Compton Family Ice Arena • Notre Dame, Indiana	Peacock	Augustine	W 4–1	5,243	8–1–0 (3–0–0)
November 15	6:00 pm	at Notre Dame	#1	Compton Family Ice Arena • Notre Dame, Indiana	Peacock	Augustine	W 3–1	4,822	9–1–0 (4–0–0)
November 21	8:30 pm	#7 Wisconsin	#1	Munn Ice Arena • East Lansing, Michigan	B1G+	Augustine	L 4–5	6,555	9–2–0 (4–1–0)
November 22	7:00 pm	#7 Wisconsin	#1	Munn Ice Arena • East Lansing, Michigan	B1G+	Augustine	L 1–2 ^{OT}	6,555	9–3–0 (4–2–0)
November 26	7:00 pm	Colgate*	#3	Munn Ice Arena • East Lansing, Michigan	B1G+	Strahl	W 5–2	6,555	10–3–0
November 28	4:00 pm	Colgate*	#3	Munn Ice Arena • East Lansing, Michigan	B1G+	Augustine	W 4–1	6,555	11–3–0
December 5	8:30 pm	#1 Michigan	#3	Munn Ice Arena • East Lansing, Michigan (Rivalry)	BTN	Augustine	L 0–3	6,555	11–4–0 (4–3–0)
December 6	7:00 pm	at #1 Michigan	#3	Yost Ice Arena • Ann Arbor, Michigan (Rivalry)	B1G+	Augustine	W 3–1	5,800	12–4–0 (5–3–0)
Great Lakes Invitational
December 28	7:00 pm	vs. Ferris State*	#3	Van Andel Arena • Grand Rapids, Michigan (Great Lakes Invitational Semifinal)	Midco Sports+	Augustine	W 5–2	7,764	13–4–0
December 29	7:00 pm	vs. Michigan Tech*	#3	Van Andel Arena • Grand Rapids, Michigan (Great Lakes Invitational Championship)	Midco Sports+	Augustine	W 4–1	5,024	14–4–0
Exhibition
January 4	8:50 am	USNTDP*	#3	Munn Ice Arena • East Lansing, Michigan (Exhibition)		Strahl	W 4–2	6,555	
Regular season
January 9	6:30 pm	at Ohio State	#2	Value City Arena • Columbus, Ohio	B1G+	Augustine	W 6–2	4,627	15–4–0 (6–3–0)
January 10	5:00 pm	at Ohio State	#2	Value City Arena • Columbus, Ohio	B1G+	Augustine	L 1–2	5,553	15–5–0 (6–4–0)
January 15	9:00 pm	at #2 Wisconsin	#4	Kohl Center • Madison, Wisconsin	BTN	Augustine	W 4–3	7,677	16–5–0 (7–4–0)
January 16	8:00 pm	at #2 Wisconsin	#4	Kohl Center • Madison, Wisconsin	B1G+	Augustine	W 4–1	12,114	17–5–0 (8–4–0)
January 23	7:00 pm	Minnesota	#2	Munn Ice Arena • East Lansing, Michigan	B1G+	Augustine	W 3–1	6,555	18–5–0 (9–4–0)
January 24	6:00 pm	Minnesota	#2	Munn Ice Arena • East Lansing, Michigan	BTN	Augustine	W 3–2	6,555	19–5–0 (10–4–0)
January 30	6:00 pm	at #5 Penn State	#2	Pegula Ice Arena • University Park, Pennsylvania	B1G+	Augustine	W 6–3	6,591	20–5–0 (11–4–0)
January 31	1:00 pm	at #5 Penn State	#2	Beaver Stadium • University Park, Pennsylvania	BTN	Augustine	W 5–4 ^{OT}	74,575	21–5–0 (12–4–0)
February 6	7:00 pm	at #1 Michigan	#2	Yost Ice Arena • Ann Arbor, Michigan (Rivalry)	FS1	Augustine	L 3–4 ^{OT}	5,800	21–6–0 (12–5–0)
February 7	6:30 pm	vs. #1 Michigan	#2	Little Caesars Arena • Detroit, Michigan (Duel in the D)	BTN	Augustine	W 5–2	19,405	22–6–0 (13–5–0)
February 19	7:30 pm	Notre Dame	#1	Munn Ice Arena • East Lansing, Michigan	BTN	Augustine	W 4–2	6,555	23–6–0 (14–5–0)
February 20	6:00 pm	Notre Dame	#1	Munn Ice Arena • East Lansing, Michigan	BTN	Augustine	W 8–2	6,555	24–6–0 (15–5–0)
February 27	8:30 pm	Ohio State	#1	Munn Ice Arena • East Lansing, Michigan	BTN	Augustine	L 1–5	6,555	24–7–0 (15–6–0)
February 28	8:00 pm	Ohio State	#1	Munn Ice Arena • East Lansing, Michigan	BTN	Augustine	T 3–3 ^{SOW}	6,555	24–7–1 (15–6–1)
March 5	8:00 pm	at Minnesota	#2	3M Arena at Mariucci • Minneapolis, Minnesota	B1G+	Augustine	W 7–1	5,442	25–7–1 (16–6–1)
March 6	8:00 pm	at Minnesota	#2	3M Arena at Mariucci • Minneapolis, Minnesota	B1G+	Strahl	T 3–3 ^{SOL}	9,265	25–7–2 (16–6–2)
Big Ten Tournament
March 14	7:30 p.m.	Ohio State	#3	Munn Ice Arena • East Lansing, Michigan (Semifinal)	BTN	Augustine	L 2–3 ^{OT}	6,555	25–8–2
NCAA Tournament
March 26	1:30 p.m.	vs. #14 UConn*	#3	DCU Center • Worcester, Massachusetts (Regional Semifinal)	ESPN2	Augustine	W 2–1	4,018	26–8–2
March 28	4:36 p.m.	vs. #12 Wisconsin*	#3	DCU Center • Worcester, Massachusetts (Regional Final)	ESPN2	Augustine	L 3–4 ^{OT}	3,788	26–9–2
*Non-conference game. ^{#}Rankings from USCHO.com Poll. All times are in Eastern Time. Source:

== Statistics ==
=== Scoring ===
Name	Position	Games	Goals	Assists	Points	PIM
Austin Baker	D	14	0	1	1	15
Sean Barnhill	D	37	0	4	4	14
Matt Basgall	D	37	4	16	20	4
Cole Burke	F	2	1	0	1	0
Patrick Geary	D	35	2	9	11	70
Griffin Jurecki	F	22	2	3	5	2
Matthew Lahey	D	19	0	5	5	4
Ryker Lee	F	35	15	15	30	26
Cayden Lindstrom	F	31	3	7	10	94
Nathan Mackie	F	11	0	0	0	4
Tommi Männistö	F	37	12	9	21	6
Porter Martone	F	35	25	25	50	78
Eric Nilson	F	35	3	8	11	41
Gavin O'Connell	F	37	6	10	16	16
Colin Ralph	D	37	1	10	11	29
Anthony Romani	F	37	14	14	28	12
Daniel Russell	F	37	11	28	39	32
Tiernan Shoudy	F	37	7	13	20	33
Travis Shoudy	D	17	0	3	3	4
Charlie Stramel	F	37	19	25	44	32
Maxim Strbak	D	37	3	15	18	10
Shane Vansaghi	F	35	4	7	11	28
Cole Ward	D	8	0	0	0	19
Owen West	D	33	4	9	13	10
Total		37	136	237	373	1293

=== Goaltending ===
(through March 25, 2026)

Name	Games	Minutes	Wins	Losses	Ties	Goals against	Saves	Shut outs	SV %	GAA
Trey Augustine	34	2048:08	24	9	1	72	947	3	.929	2.11
Dolan Gilbert	3	4:17	0	0	0	0	0	0	.000	0.00
Melvin Strahl	4	185:00	2	0	1	7	83	0	.922	2.27
Total	41	2248:05	26	9	2	79	1030	3	.2929	2.11

== Rankings ==
Poll	Week																											
Poll	Pre	1	2	3	4	5	6	7	8	9	10	11	12	13	14	15	16	17	18	19	20	21	22	23	24	25	26	27 (Final)
USCHO.com	3 (14)	2 (11)	3 (5)	1 (29)	1 (45)	1 (42)	1 (50)	1 (50)	3 (5)	3 (3)	3 (2)	3 (1)	–	3	2 (2)	4	2	2 (1)	2 (2)	1 (30)	1 (37)	1 (49)	2 (11)	3 (7)	3	3	3	5
USA Hockey	3 (6)	2 (3)	4 (1)	1 (17)	1 (32)	1 (30)	1 (34)	1 (34)	3	3	3	3	–	3	2	3	2	2	2	1 (18)	1 (25)	1 (30)	3 (1)	3 (3)	3	3	5	5

Note: USCHO did not release a poll in week 12.
Note: USA Hockey did not release a poll in week 12.
