= 2025–26 Notre Dame Fighting Irish men's ice hockey season =

- Conference: Big Ten
- Home ice: Compton Family Ice Arena

Record
- Overall: 9–23–5
- Conference: 5–17–2
- Home: 6–8–4
- Road: 3–15–1
- Neutral: 0–1–0

Coaches and captains
- Head coach: Brock Sheahan
- Assistant coaches: Andy Slaggert (until Nov. 1); Mike Garman; Andrew Oglevie; Tristan Musser (since Nov. 1)
- Captain(s): Michael Mastrodomenico; Danny Nelson
- Alternate captain(s): Paul Fischer; Cole Knuble; Axel Kumlin

The 2025–26 Notre Dame Fighting Irish men's ice hockey season was the 66th season of play for the program and 9th in the Big Ten Conference. The Fighting Irish represented the University of Notre Dame in the 2025–26 NCAA Division I men's ice hockey season, played their home games at Compton Family Ice Arena and were coached by Brock Sheahan in his first season.

== Departures ==
Player	Position	Nationality	Cause
Blake Biondi	Forward	United States	Graduation (signed with Chicago Wolves)
Tyler Carpenter	Forward	United States	Graduation (signed with Yétis du Mont-Blanc)
Ryan Helliwell	Defenseman	Canada	Graduation (retired)
Justin Janicke	Forward	United States	Graduation (signed with Coachella Valley Firebirds)
James Mooney	Goaltender	United States	Graduation (retired)
Ian Murphy	Forward	United States	Graduation (retired)
Zach Plucinski	Defenseman	United States	Graduation (retired)
Luke Robinson	Defenseman	United States	Graduation (retired)
Owen Say	Goaltender	Canada	Signed professional contract (Calgary Flames)
Grant Silianoff	Forward	United States	Graduation (retired)
Hunter Strand	Forward	United States	Graduation (retired)
Hunter Weiss	Defenseman	United States	Graduation (retired)

== Recruiting ==
Player	Position	Nationality	Age	Notes
Will Belle	Forward	United States	18	Dongguan, China; selected 137th overall in 2025
Cole Brown	Forward	Canada	20	Rocky View County, AB; selected 164th overall in 2023
Caeden Carlisle	Defenseman	Canada	21	Mississauga, ON
Pano Fimis	Forward	Canada	21	Richmond Hill, ON
Drew Mackie	Defenseman	United States	20	Anchorage, AK
Sutter Muzzatti	Forward	United States	22	Okemos, MI; transfer from Rensselaer; selected 143rd overall in 2023
Dashel Oliver	Forward	United States	20	Bloomington, IN
Charlie Pardue	Forward	United States	19	Winnetka, IL
Luke Pearson	Goaltender	Canada	24	Whitby, ON; transfer from Yale
Evan Werner	Forward	United States	22	Flower Mound, TX; transfer from Michigan

== Roster ==
As of August 16, 2025.

No.	Nat.	Player	Class	Pos	Height	Weight	DoB	Hometown	Previous team	NHL rights
2	(United States)	Jimmy Jurcev	Sophomore	D	6' 5" (1.96 m)	207 lb (94 kg)	2003-05-05	Palos Heights, Illinois	Lincoln Stars (USHL)	—
3	(United States)	Charlie Pardue	Freshman	F	5' 11" (1.8 m)	184 lb (83 kg)	2006-01-05	Winnetka, Illinois	Tri-City Storm (USHL)	—
4	(Canada)	Michael Mastrodomenico (C)	Senior	D	6' 1" (1.85 m)	205 lb (93 kg)	2004-04-19	Kirkland, Quebec	Lincoln Stars (USHL)	—
5	(Sweden)	Axel Kumlin (A)	Senior	D	6' 1" (1.85 m)	206 lb (93 kg)	2002-02-23	Stockholm, Sweden	Miami (NCHC)	—
6	(United States)	Drew Mackie	Freshman	D	6' 0" (1.83 m)	189 lb (86 kg)	2005-06-17	Anchorage, Alaska	Brooks Bandits (BCHL)	—
8	(United States)	Will Belle	Freshman	F	6' 4" (1.93 m)	235 lb (107 kg)	2007-01-14	Dongguan, China	USNTDP (USHL)	TOR, 137th overall 2025
9	(Canada)	Cole Brown	Freshman	F	6' 3" (1.91 m)	196 lb (89 kg)	2005-04-27	Rocky View County, Alberta	Brantford Bulldogs (OHL)	NJD, 164th overall 2023
11	(United States)	Danny Nelson (C)	Junior	F	6' 3" (1.91 m)	220 lb (100 kg)	2005-08-03	Maple Grove, Minnesota	USNTDP (USHL)	NYI, 49th overall 2023
12	(United States)	Henry Nelson	Junior	D	6' 2" (1.88 m)	206 lb (93 kg)	2003-03-25	Maple Grove, Minnesota	Lincoln Stars (USHL)	—
13	(United States)	Brennan Ali	Junior	F	6' 1" (1.85 m)	194 lb (88 kg)	2004-02-09	Glencoe, Illinois	Lincoln Stars (USHL)	DET, 212th overall 2023
14	(United States)	Maddox Fleming	Junior	F	5' 11" (1.8 m)	186 lb (84 kg)	2004-02-13	Rochester, Minnesota	Sioux Falls Stampede (USHL)	—
15	(Canada)	Jayden Davis	Junior	F	5' 11" (1.8 m)	194 lb (88 kg)	2003-03-02	Calgary, Alberta	Green Bay Gamblers (USHL)	—
16	(United States)	Paul Fischer (A)	Junior	D	6' 1" (1.85 m)	211 lb (96 kg)	2005-01-30	River Forest, Illinois	USNTDP (USHL)	EDM, 138th overall 2023
17	(Canada)	Pano Fimis	Freshman	F	5' 10" (1.78 m)	182 lb (83 kg)	2004-06-17	Richmond Hill, Ontario	Erie Otters (OHL)	—
18	(United States)	Jack Larrigan	Sophomore	F	5' 10" (1.78 m)	185 lb (84 kg)	2004-04-09	St. Louis, Missouri	Cedar Rapids RoughRiders (USHL)	—
19	(United States)	Evan Werner	Junior	F	5' 8" (1.73 m)	189 lb (86 kg)	2003-02-13	Flower Mound, Texas	Michigan (Big Ten)	—
20	(Canada)	Niko Jovanovic	Senior	F	6' 4" (1.93 m)	223 lb (101 kg)	2002-06-13	West Vancouver, British Columbia	Spruce Grove Saints (AJHL)	—
21	(United States)	Jaedon Kerr	Sophomore	D	6' 4" (1.93 m)	228 lb (103 kg)	2003-09-13	Elk River, Minnesota	Waterloo Black Hawks (USHL)	—
22	(United States)	Cole Knuble (A)	Junior	F	5' 10" (1.78 m)	190 lb (86 kg)	2004-07-01	Grand Rapids, Michigan	Fargo Force (USHL)	PHI, 103rd overall 2023
23	(United States)	Michael Schermerhorn	Sophomore	F	6' 0" (1.83 m)	219 lb (99 kg)	2003-10-14	Traverse City, Michigan	New Mexico Ice Wolves (NAHL)	—
24	(United States)	Dashel Oliver	Freshman	F	5' 10" (1.78 m)	189 lb (86 kg)	2005-02-24	Bloomington, Indiana	Lincoln Stars (USHL)	—
25	(United States)	Carter Slaggert	Junior	F	5' 10" (1.78 m)	175 lb (79 kg)	2005-03-04	South Bend, Indiana	USNTDP (USHL)	—
27	(Canada)	Caeden Carlisle	Freshman	D	6' 1" (1.85 m)	200 lb (91 kg)	2004-01-31	Mississauga, Ontario	Soo Greyhounds (OHL)	—
28	(United States)	Sutter Muzzatti	Graduate	F	6' 6" (1.98 m)	241 lb (109 kg)	2003-06-28	Okemos, Michigan	Renssealer (ECAC)	NSH, 143rd overall 2023
29	(United States)	Jack Williams	Senior	G	6' 3" (1.91 m)	190 lb (86 kg)	2001-06-21	St. Louis, Missouri	Waterloo Black Hawks (USHL)	—
30	(Canada)	Luke Pearson	Graduate	G	6' 2" (1.88 m)	168 lb (76 kg)	2001-01-29	Whitby, Ontario	Yale (ECAC)	—
31	(United States)	Nicholas Kempf	Sophomore	G	6' 2" (1.88 m)	196 lb (89 kg)	2006-03-01	Morton Grove, Illinois	USNTDP (USHL)	WSH, 114th overall 2024

== Standings ==
2025–26 Big Ten ice hockey Standings
	Conference record										Overall record					
	GP	W	L	T	OTW	OTL	3/SW	PTS	GF	GA	GP	W	L	T	GF	GA
#5 Michigan State †	24	16	6	2	2	2	1	51	88	54	37	26	9	2	136	79
#3 Michigan *	24	17	6	1	4	0	1	49	96	66	40	31	8	1	181	96
#11 Penn State	24	12	10	2	1	3	1	41	86	82	37	21	14	2	136	117
#2 Wisconsin	24	14	10	0	3	0	0	39	95	84	39	24	13	2	142	115
Ohio State	24	8	15	1	1	5	0	29	78	100	37	14	21	2	119	134
Minnesota	24	7	15	2	0	2	2	27	61	79	36	11	22	3	97	125
Notre Dame	24	5	17	2	3	2	0	12	65	104	37	9	23	5	103	151
Championship: March 21, 2026 † indicates conference regular season champion * indicates conference tournament champion Rankings: USCHO.com Top 20 Poll; updated April 15, 2026

== Schedule and results ==
Date	Time	Opponent^{#}	Rank^{#}	Site	TV	Decision	Result	Attendance	Record
Exhibition
October 3		at USNTDP*		USA Hockey Arena • Plymouth, Michigan (Exhibition)			W 5–2	—	—
Ice Breaker Tournament
October 10	10:00 pm	at #15 Arizona State*		Mullett Arena • Tempe, Arizona (Ice Breaker Semifinal)	Fox 10	Kempf	L 3–5	5,039	0–1–0
October 11	3:00 pm	vs. #8 Quinnipiac*		Mullett Arena • Tempe, Arizona (Ice Breaker Consolation)		Kempf	L 2–7	100	0–2–0
Regular season
October 16	7:00 pm	St. Lawrence*		Compton Family Ice Arena • Notre Dame, Indiana	Peacock	Kempf	W 8–2	4,366	1–2–0
October 17	7:00 pm	St. Lawrence*		Compton Family Ice Arena • Notre Dame, Indiana	Peacock	Kempf	W 3–0	5,077	2–2–0
October 24	7:00 pm	Robert Morris*		Compton Family Ice Arena • Notre Dame, Indiana	Peacock	Kempf	W 6–3	4,054	3–2–0
October 25	6:00 pm	Robert Morris*		Compton Family Ice Arena • Notre Dame, Indiana	Peacock	Kempf	T 2–2 ^{OT}	4,162	3–2–1
October 31	7:00 pm	#2 Michigan		Compton Family Ice Arena • Notre Dame, Indiana	Peacock	Kempf	L 3–5	4,507	3–3–1 (0–1–0)
November 1	6:00 pm	#2 Michigan		Compton Family Ice Arena • Notre Dame, Indiana	Peacock	Kempf	L 1–2 ^{OT}	5,039	3–4–1 (0–2–0)
November 7	8:00 pm	at Minnesota		3M Arena at Mariucci • Minneapolis, Minnesota		Kempf	L 0–3	9,529	3–5–1 (0–3–0)
November 8	8:00 pm	at Minnesota		3M Arena at Mariucci • Minneapolis, Minnesota		Kempf	L 1–4	8,947	3–6–1 (0–4–0)
November 14	7:00 pm	#1 Michigan State		Compton Family Ice Arena • Notre Dame, Indiana	Peacock	Kempf	L 1–4	5,243	3–7–1 (0–5–0)
November 15	6:00 pm	#1 Michigan State		Compton Family Ice Arena • Notre Dame, Indiana	Peacock	Kempf	L 1–3	4,822	3–8–1 (0–6–0)
November 26	2:00 pm	at Merrimack*		J. Thom Lawler Rink • North Andover, Massachusetts	ESPN+	Kempf	W 5–4	2,647	4–8–1
November 28	1:00 pm	at #15 Boston College*		Conte Forum • Chestnut Hill, Massachusetts (Holy War on Ice)	ESPN+, NESN	Kempf	L 3–5	7,230	4–9–1
December 5	7:00 pm	#2 Wisconsin		Compton Family Ice Arena • Notre Dame, Indiana	Peacock	Kempf	L 4–7	5,283	4–10–1 (0–7–0)
December 6	6:00 pm	#2 Wisconsin		Compton Family Ice Arena • Notre Dame, Indiana	Peacock	Kempf	L 2–9	5,046	4–11–1 (0–8–0)
January 2	7:00 pm	#7 Western Michigan*		Compton Family Ice Arena • Notre Dame, Indiana	Peacock	Williams	L 0–4	5,166	4–12–1
January 3	6:00 pm	at #7 Western Michigan*		Lawson Arena • Kalamazoo, Michigan		Pearson	L 0–4	4,047	4–13–1
January 9	7:00 pm	at #1 Michigan		Yost Ice Arena • Ann Arbor, Michigan		Kempf	L 2–5	5,800	4–14–1 (0–9–0)
January 10	7:00 pm	at #1 Michigan		Yost Ice Arena • Ann Arbor, Michigan		Kempf	L 4–7	5,800	4–15–1 (0–10–0)
January 16	7:00 pm	at #8 Penn State		Pegula Ice Arena • University Park, Pennsylvania		Kempf	L 1–4	6,455	4–16–1 (0–11–0)
January 17	8:00 pm	at #8 Penn State		Pegula Ice Arena • University Park, Pennsylvania		Kempf	L 3–6	6,449	4–17–1 (0–12–0)
January 23	7:00 pm	Ohio State		Compton Family Ice Arena • Notre Dame, Indiana	Peacock	Kempf	L 2–4	5,186	4–18–1 (0–13–0)
January 24	5:00 pm	Ohio State		Compton Family Ice Arena • Notre Dame, Indiana	Peacock	Kempf	W 6–1	5,087	5–18–1 (1–13–0)
January 30	7:00 pm	Bowling Green*		Compton Family Ice Arena • Notre Dame, Indiana	Peacock	Kempf	T 3–3 ^{OT}	5,063	5–18–2
January 31	7:07 pm	at Bowling Green*		Slater Family Ice Arena • Bowling Green, Ohio	Midco Sports+	Kempf	T 2–2 ^{OT}	5,000	5–18–3
February 6	8:00 pm	at #13 Wisconsin		Kohl Center • Madison, Wisconsin		Kempf	L 5–6 ^{OT}	10,880	5–19–3 (1–14–0)
February 7	8:00 pm	at #13 Wisconsin		Kohl Center • Madison, Wisconsin		Kempf	L 4–5	12,148	5–20–3 (1–15–0)
February 13	7:00 pm	Minnesota		Compton Family Ice Arena • Notre Dame, Indiana	Peacock	Kempf	T 2–2 ^{SOL}	5,050	5–20–4 (1–15–1)
February 14	6:00 pm	Minnesota		Compton Family Ice Arena • Notre Dame, Indiana	Peacock	Kempf	W 3–2	5,120	6–20–4 (2–15–1)
February 19	7:30 pm	at #1 Michigan State		Munn Ice Arena • East Lansing, Michigan	BTN	Pearson	L 2–4	6,555	6–21–4 (2–16–1)
February 20	6:00 pm	at #1 Michigan State		Munn Ice Arena • East Lansing, Michigan	BTN	Pearson	L 2–8	6,555	6–22–4 (2–17–1)
February 27	7:00 pm	#5 Penn State		Compton Family Ice Arena • Notre Dame, Indiana	Peacock, TSN	Kempf	T 3–3 ^{SOL}	5,192	6–22–5 (2–17–2)
February 28	6:00 pm	#5 Penn State		Compton Family Ice Arena • Notre Dame, Indiana	Peacock	Kempf	W 4–3 ^{OT}	5,089	7–22–5 (3–17–2)
March 5	6:30 pm	at Ohio State		Value City Arena • Columbus, Ohio		Kempf	W 5–4 ^{OT}	6,852	8–22–5 (4–17–2)
March 6	6:30 pm	at Ohio State		Value City Arena • Columbus, Ohio		Kempf	W 4–3 ^{OT}	5,989	9–22–5 (5–17–2)
Big Ten Tournament
March 11	7:00 pm	at #1 Michigan*		Yost Ice Arena • Ann Arbor, Michigan (Quarterfinal)	B1G+	Kempf	L 1–6	5,347	9–23–5
*Non-conference game. ^{#}Rankings from USCHO.com Poll. All times are in Eastern Time. Source:

== Rankings ==
Ranking movements Legend: ██ Increase in ranking ██ Decrease in ranking — = Not ranked RV = Received votes
	Week																											
Poll	Pre	1	2	3	4	5	6	7	8	9	10	11	12	13	14	15	16	17	18	19	20	21	22	23	24	25	26	Final
USCHO.com	RV	RV	—	—	—	—	—	—	—	—	—	—	*	—	—	—	—	—	—	—	—	—	—	—	—	—		
USA Hockey	RV	RV	—	—	—	—	—	—	—	—	—	—	*	—	—	—	—	—	—	—	—	—	—	—	—	—		

Note: USCHO did not release a poll in week 12.
Note: USA Hockey did not release a poll in week 12.
