= Brock Sheahan =

Canadian ice hockey player and coach (born 1984)

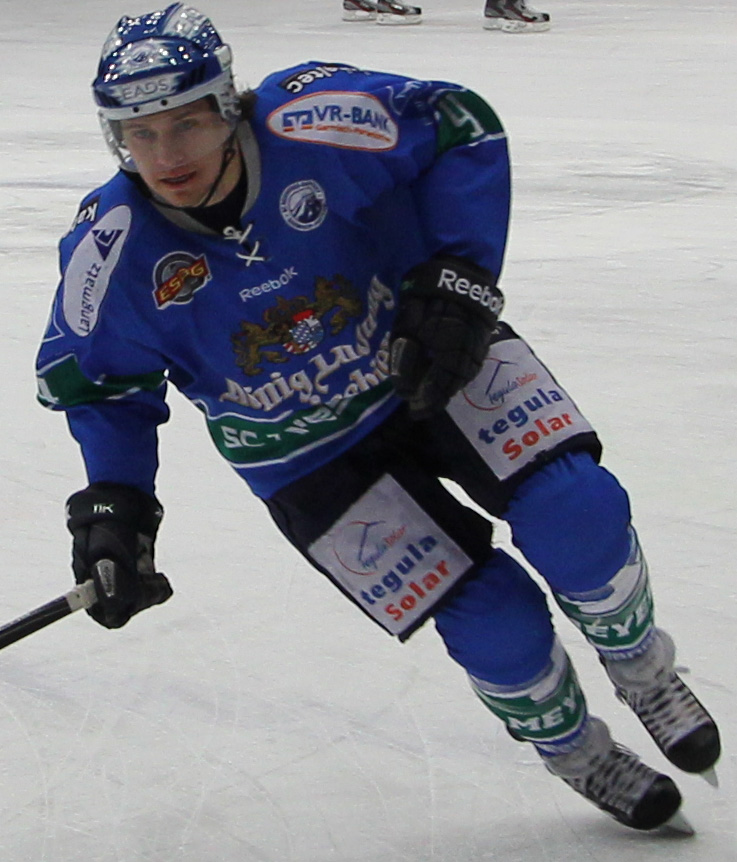

Current position
- Title: Head coach
- Team: Notre Dame
- Conference: Big Ten
- Record: 9–23–5 (.311)

Biographical details
- Born: May 6, 1984 (age 42); Lethbridge, Alberta, Canada

Playing career
- 2004–2008: Notre Dame
- 2008–2009: Wheeling Nailers
- 2009–2011: Cincinnati Cyclones
- 2011–2012: SC Riessersee
- 2012–2013: Ontario Reign
- Position: Defenceman

Coaching career (HC unless noted)
- 2014–2016: Holy Cross (asst.)
- 2016–2018: Holy Cross (asoc.)
- 2018–2020: Chicago Steel (asoc.)
- 2020–2022: Chicago Steel
- 2022–2023: Chicago Wolves
- 2023–2025: Notre Dame (asoc.)
- 2025–present: Notre Dame

Head coaching record
- Overall: 9–23–5 (.311)

Brock James Sheahan (born May 6, 1984) is a Canadian professional ice hockey coach and former defenceman who is the head coach of the Notre Dame Fighting Irish of the Big Ten Conference.

== Playing career ==
Sheahan played his college ice hockey at Notre Dame from 2004 to 2008. He recorded four goals and 29 assists in 161 games. He served as alternate captain his senior year, and helped lead the Irish to the Frozen Four for the first time in program history.

Following his collegiate career, he played four seasons in the East Coast Hockey League (ECHL), one season with the Wheeling Nailers, two seasons with the Cincinnati Cyclones and one with the Ontario Reign.

== Coaching career ==
On August 10, 2014, Sheahan was named an assistant coach for Holy Cross.

Following four years at Holy Cross, he then served as an associate head coach for the Chicago Steel of the United States Hockey League (USHL) for two years. On December 1, 2019, he was promoted to head coach of the Steel, after former head coach Greg Moore left midway through the 2019–20 season. He finished the 2019–20 with a record of 26–3–0–0, in a season that was shortened due to the COVID-19 pandemic, and led the Steel to the Anderson Cup. He again led the Steel to the Anderson Cup during the 2020–21 season, and the Clark Cup in 2021. He finished his career with the Steel as the winningest coach in program history, with a record of 108–30–12–3, including the postseason.

On August 23, 2022, he was named head coach of the Chicago Wolves of the American Hockey League (AHL). During the 2022–23 season, he led the Wolves to a 35–29–5 regular season record.

On June 20, 2023, he was named an associate head coach for Notre Dame. On June 24, 2024, he was named the head coach in waiting for Notre Dame, after longtime head coach Jeff Jackson announced he would retire following the 2024–25 season. On March 17, 2025, he was officially named the head coach for Notre Dame.

== Head coaching record ==
Record table
| Season | Team | Overall | Conference | Standing | Postseason |
|---|---|---|---|---|---|
Notre Dame Fighting Irish (Big Ten) (2025–present)
| 2025–26 | Notre Dame | 9–23–5 | 5–17–2 | | |
| Notre Dame: | | 9–23–5 | 5–17–2 | | |
| Total: | | 9–23–5 | | | |
National champion Postseason invitational champion Conference regular season champion Conference regular season and conference tournament champion Division regular season champion Division regular season and conference tournament champion Conference tournament champion

== Personal life ==
Sheahan's second cousin, Riley Sheahan, is a former professional ice hockey player.
