= 2025–26 Michigan Wolverines men's ice hockey season =

Big Ten Tournament, Champion NCAA Tournament, Frozen Four
- Conference: Big Ten
- Home ice: Yost Ice Arena

Rankings
- USCHO: #3
- USA Today: #3

Record
- Overall: 31–8–1
- Conference: 17–6–1
- Home: 16–3–1
- Road: 13–3–0
- Neutral: 2–2–0

Coaches and captains
- Head coach: Brandon Naurato
- Assistant coaches: Rob Rassey; Mathew Deschamps; Kevin Reiter
- Captain: T. J. Hughes
- Alternate captain(s): Kienan Draper; Tyler Duke; Luca Fantilli

The 2025–26 Michigan Wolverines men's hockey team was the Wolverines' 104th season of play. They represented the University of Michigan in the 2025–26 NCAA Division I men's ice hockey season. They were coached by Brandon Naurato, in his fourth year as head coach, and played their home games at Yost Ice Arena.

== Previous season ==
During the 2024–25 season, Michigan went 18–15–3, including 12–10–2 in Big Ten play. They were eliminated by Penn State in the quarterfinals of the 2025 Big Ten men's ice hockey tournament.

== Departures ==
| Player | Position | Nationality | Cause |
|---|---|---|---|
| Ethan Edwards | Defenseman | Canada | Graduation (signed with New Jersey Devils) |
| Mark Estapa | Forward | United States | Graduation (signed with Laval Rocket) |
| Jackson Hallum | Forward | United States | Signed professional contract (Vegas Golden Knights) |
| Christian Humphreys | Forward | United States | Transferred to Kitchener Rangers |
| Philippe Lapointe | Forward | United States | Graduation |
| Tim Lovell | Defenseman | United States | Graduation |
| Jacob Truscott | Defenseman | United States | Graduation (signed with Grand Rapids Griffins) |

== Recruiting ==
| Player | Position | Nationality | Age | Notes |
|---|---|---|---|---|
| Asher Barnett | Defenseman | United States | 18 | Wilmette, IL |
| Jack Ivankovic | Goaltender | Canada | 18 | Mississauga, ON |
| Matthew Mania | Defenseman | United States | 20 | Brandon, FL |
| Cole McKinney | Forward | United States | 18 | Lake Forest, IL |
| Henry Mews | Defenseman | Canada | 18 | Ottawa, ON |
| Julian Molinaro | Goaltender | Canada | 21 | Mississauga, ON; transfer from Northern Michigan |
| Ben Robertson | Defenseman | United States | 20 | Potomac Falls, VA; transfer from Cornell |
| Aidan Park | Forward | United States | 19 | Playa Vista, CA |
| Stephen Peck | Goaltender | United States | 20 | New York, NY |
| Jayden Perron | Forward | Canada | 23 | Winnipeg, MA; transfer from North Dakota |
| Drew Schock | Defenseman | United States | 18 | Green Bay, WI |
| Malcolm Spence | Forward | Canada | 18 | Mississauga, ON |
| Teddy Spitznagel | Forward | United States | 19 | Bloomfield Hills, MI |
| Adam Valentini | Forward | Canada | 17 | Toronto, ON |

== Roster ==
As of September 1, 2025.

| No. | Nat. | Player | Class | Pos | Height | Weight | DoB | Hometown | Previous team | NHL rights |
|---|---|---|---|---|---|---|---|---|---|---|
| 3 | (United States) | Hunter Hady | Sophomore | D | 6' 4" (1.93 m) | 205 lb (93 kg) | 2004-08-02 | Rochester, Minnesota | Chicago (USHL) | — |
| 4 | (United States) | Asher Barnett | Freshman | D | 6' 1" (1.85 m) | 201 lb (91 kg) | 2007-05-16 | Wilmette, Illinois | USNTDP (USHL) | EDM, 131st overall 2025 |
| 5 | (United States) | Tyler Duke (A) | Senior | D | 5' 10" (1.78 m) | 190 lb (86 kg) | 2004-07-19 | Strongsville, Ohio | Ohio State (Big Ten) | — |
| 6 | (United States) | Josh Eernisse | Senior | F | 6' 2" (1.88 m) | 215 lb (98 kg) | 2004-12-31 | Apple Valley, Minnesota | St. Thomas (CCHA) | — |
| 7 | (United States) | Dakoda Rhéaume-Mullen | Sophomore | D | 6' 1" (1.85 m) | 192 lb (87 kg) | 2006-12-18 | Northville, Michigan | USNTDP (USHL) | — |
| 8 | (United States) | Teddy Spitznagel | Freshman | F | 6' 3" (1.91 m) | 195 lb (88 kg) | 2006-04-06 | Bloomfield Hills, Michigan | Muskegon (USHL) | — |
| 9 | (Canada) | Nick Moldenhauer | Junior | F | 5' 11" (1.8 m) | 185 lb (84 kg) | 2004-05-25 | Mississauga, Ontario | Chicago (USHL) | TOR, 95th overall 2022 |
| 10 | (United States) | Drew Schock | Freshman | D | 6' 0" (1.83 m) | 182 lb (83 kg) | 2007-02-07 | Green Bay, Wisconsin | USNTDP (USHL) | ANA, 101st overall 2025 |
| 10 | (United States) | Cole McKinney | Freshman | F | 6' 0" (1.83 m) | 200 lb (91 kg) | 2007-03-16 | Lake Forest, Illinois | USNTDP (USHL) | SJS, 53rd overall 2025 |
| 13 | (Canada) | T. J. Hughes (C) | Senior | F | 6' 0" (1.83 m) | 185 lb (84 kg) | 2001-11-09 | Hamilton, Ontario | Brooks (AJHL) | — |
| 15 | (United States) | Aidan Park | Freshman | F | 6' 1" (1.85 m) | 187 lb (85 kg) | 2006-01-06 | Playa Vista, California | Green Bay (USHL) | EDM, 223rd overall 2025 |
| 17 | (United States) | Garrett Schifsky | Junior | F | 5' 9" (1.75 m) | 180 lb (82 kg) | 2003-04-08 | Andover, Minnesota | Waterloo (USHL) | — |
| 18 | (Canada) | Jayden Perron | Junior | F | 5' 9" (1.75 m) | 175 lb (79 kg) | 2005-01-11 | Winnipeg, Manitoba | North Dakota (NCHC) | CAR, 94th overall 2023 |
| 19 | (Canada) | Michael Hage | Sophomore | F | 6' 1" (1.85 m) | 190 lb (86 kg) | 2006-04-14 | Oakville, Ontario | Chicago (USHL) | MTL, 21st overall 2024 |
| 21 | (United States) | Ben Robertson | Junior | F | 5' 11" (1.8 m) | 197 lb (89 kg) | 2004-09-18 | Potomac Falls, Virginia | Cornell (ECAC) | — |
| 23 | (United States) | Miles Gust | Sophomore | D | 5' 9" (1.75 m) | 180 lb (82 kg) | 2004-03-17 | Chicago, Illinois | Muskegon (USHL) | — |
| 27 | (Canada) | Malcolm Spence | Freshman | F | 6' 2" (1.88 m) | 190 lb (86 kg) | 2006-09-22 | Mississauga, Ontario | Erie (OHL) | NYR, 43rd overall 2025 |
| 31 | (United States) | Stephen Peck | Freshman | G | 6' 3" (1.91 m) | 183 lb (83 kg) | 2005-01-18 | New York, New York | Muskegon (USHL) | — |
| 33 | (United States) | Kienan Draper (A) | Senior | F | 6' 2" (1.88 m) | 212 lb (96 kg) | 2002-02-19 | Bloomfield Hills, Michigan | Chilliwack (BCHL) | DET, 187th overall 2020 |
| 34 | (Canada) | Julian Molinaro | Sophomore | G | 5' 11" (1.8 m) | 185 lb (84 kg) | 2003-12-02 | Mississauga, Ontario | Northern Michigan (CCHA) | — |
| 44 | (United States) | Will Horcoff | Sophomore | F | 6' 5" (1.96 m) | 203 lb (92 kg) | 2007-01-23 | Birmingham, Michigan | USNTDP (USHL) | PIT, 24th overall 2025 |
| 63 | (Canada) | Luca Fantilli (A) | Senior | D | 6' 0" (1.83 m) | 187 lb (85 kg) | 2002-12-30 | Nobleton, Ontario | Chicago (USHL) | — |
| 68 | (Canada) | Josh Orrico | Junior | D | 5' 9" (1.75 m) | 180 lb (82 kg) | 2003-06-15 | Woodbridge, Ontario | Janesville (NAHL) | — |
| 72 | (Canada) | Jack Ivankovic | Freshman | G | 6' 0" (1.83 m) | 172 lb (78 kg) | 2007-05-22 | Mississauga, Ontario | Brampton (OHL) | NSH, 58th overall 2025 |
| 88 | (Canada) | Henry Mews | Freshman | D | 6' 1" (1.85 m) | 190 lb (86 kg) | 2006-03-09 | Ottawa, Ontario | Sudbury (OHL) | CGY, 74th overall 2024 |
| 92 | (Canada) | Adam Valentini | Freshman | F | 5' 11" (1.8 m) | 185 lb (84 kg) | 2008-04-11 | Toronto, Ontario | Chicago (USHL) | — |
| 93 | (United States) | Matthew Mania | Freshman | D | 6' 1" (1.85 m) | 190 lb (86 kg) | 2005-01-11 | Brandon, Florida | Flint (OHL) | — |

== Coaching staff ==
| Name | Position coached | Seasons at Michigan |
|---|---|---|
| Brandon Naurato | Head coach | 4th |
| Rob Rassey | Associate head coach | 3rd |
| Mathew Deschamps | Assistant coach | 3rd |
| Kevin Reiter | Assistant coach | 3rd |
| Evan Hall | Director of Hockey Operations | 3rd |
| Joe Maher | Head Strength and Conditioning Coach | 8th |

== Standings ==
2025–26 Big Ten ice hockey Standings
| | Conference record | | | | | | | | | | Overall record | | | | | |
| | GP | W | L | T | OTW | OTL | 3/SW | PTS | GF | GA | GP | W | L | T | GF | GA |
|---|---|---|---|---|---|---|---|---|---|---|---|---|---|---|---|---|
| #5 Michigan State † | 24 | 16 | 6 | 2 | 2 | 2 | 1 | 51 | 88 | 54 | 37 | 26 | 9 | 2 | 136 | 79 |
| #3 Michigan * | 24 | 17 | 6 | 1 | 4 | 0 | 1 | 49 | 96 | 66 | 40 | 31 | 8 | 1 | 181 | 96 |
| #11 Penn State | 24 | 12 | 10 | 2 | 1 | 3 | 1 | 41 | 86 | 82 | 37 | 21 | 14 | 2 | 136 | 117 |
| #2 Wisconsin | 24 | 14 | 10 | 0 | 3 | 0 | 0 | 39 | 95 | 84 | 39 | 24 | 13 | 2 | 142 | 115 |
| Ohio State | 24 | 8 | 15 | 1 | 1 | 5 | 0 | 29 | 78 | 100 | 37 | 14 | 21 | 2 | 119 | 134 |
| Minnesota | 24 | 7 | 15 | 2 | 0 | 2 | 2 | 27 | 61 | 79 | 36 | 11 | 22 | 3 | 97 | 125 |
| Notre Dame | 24 | 5 | 17 | 2 | 3 | 2 | 0 | 12 | 65 | 104 | 37 | 9 | 23 | 5 | 103 | 151 |
Championship: March 21, 2026 † indicates conference regular season champion * indicates conference tournament champion Rankings: USCHO.com Top 20 Poll; updated April 15, 2026

== Schedule and results ==
| Date | Time | Opponent^{#} | Rank^{#} | Site | TV | Decision | Result | Attendance | Record |
Regular season
| October 3 | 7:00 PM | Mercyhurst* | #12 | Yost Ice Arena • Ann Arbor, MI | B1G+ | Ivankovic | W 11–1 | 5,800 | 1–0–0 |
| October 4 | 7:00 PM | Mercyhurst* | #12 | Yost Ice Arena • Ann Arbor, MI | B1G+ | Ivankovic | W 7–0 | 5,015 | 2–0–0 |
| October 10 | 7:00 PM | at #7 Providence* | #9 | Schneider Arena • Providence, RI | ESPN+, NESN | Ivankovic | W 5–1 | 2,933 | 3–0–0 |
| October 11 | 7:00 PM | at #7 Providence* | #9 | Schneider Arena • Providence, RI | ESPN+ | Ivankovic | W 3–1 | 2,630 | 4–0–0 |
| October 16 | 7:00 PM | Robert Morris* | #4 | Yost Ice Arena • Ann Arbor, MI | B1G+ | Ivankovic | W 4–2 | 5,191 | 5–0–0 |
| October 17 | 7:00 PM | Robert Morris* | #4 | Yost Ice Arena • Ann Arbor, MI | B1G+ | Ivankovic | W 10–2 | 5,800 | 6–0–0 |
| October 23 | 7:00 PM | #2 Western Michigan* | #3 | Yost Ice Arena • Ann Arbor, MI | BTN | Ivankovic | W 4–0 | 5,800 | 7–0–0 |
| October 24 | 7:00 PM | at #2 Western Michigan* | #3 | Lawson Arena • Kalamazoo, MI | NCHC.tv | Ivankovic | L 2–5 | 4,441 | 7–1–0 |
| October 31 | 7:00 PM | at Notre Dame | #2 | Compton Family Ice Arena • Notre Dame, IN (Rivalry) | Peacock | Ivankovic | W 5–3 | 4,507 | 8–1–0 (1–0–0) |
| November 1 | 6:00 PM | at Notre Dame | #2 | Compton Family Ice Arena • Notre Dame, IN (Rivalry) | Peacock | Ivankovic | W 2–1 ^{OT} | 5,039 | 9–1–0 (2–0–0) |
| November 7 | 7:00 PM | #10 Wisconsin | #2 | Yost Ice Arena • Ann Arbor, MI | B1G+ | Ivankovic | W 7–4 | 5,800 | 10–1–0 (3–0–0) |
| November 8 | 7:00 PM | #10 Wisconsin | #2 | Yost Ice Arena • Ann Arbor, MI | BTN | Ivankovic | L 1–6 | 5,800 | 10–2–0 (3–1–0) |
| November 14 | 7:00 PM | at #5 Penn State | #2 | Pegula Ice Arena • University Park, PA | B1G+ | Ivankovic | W 7–1 | 6,549 | 11–2–0 (4–1–0) |
| November 15 | 6:00 PM | at #5 Penn State | #2 | Pegula Ice Arena • University Park, PA | B1G+ | Ivankovic | L 2–4 | 6,584 | 11–3–0 (4–2–0) |
| November 21 | 7:00 PM | Ohio State | #2 | Yost Ice Arena • Ann Arbor, MI (Rivalry) | B1G+ | Ivankovic | W 5–2 | 5,800 | 12–3–0 (5–2–0) |
| November 22 | 7:00 PM | Ohio State | #2 | Yost Ice Arena • Ann Arbor, MI (Rivalry) | B1G+ | Ivankovic | W 8–1 | 5,800 | 13–3–0 (6–2–0) |
| November 28 | 7:00 PM | at Harvard* | #1 | Bright-Landry Hockey Center • Boston, MA | ESPN+ | Ivankovic | W 5–1 | 2,883 | 14–3–0 |
| November 29 | 7:00 PM | at Harvard* | #1 | Bright-Landry Hockey Center • Boston, MA | ESPN+ | Ivankovic | W 4–3 ^{OT} | 3,095 | 15–3–0 |
| December 5 | 8:30 PM | at #3 Michigan State | #1 | Munn Ice Arena • East Lansing, MI (Rivalry) | BTN | Ivankovic | W 3–0 | 6,555 | 16–3–0 (7–2–0) |
| December 6 | 7:00 PM | #3 Michigan State | #1 | Yost Ice Arena • Ann Arbor, MI (Rivalry) | B1G+ | Ivankovic | L 1–3 | 5,800 | 16–4–0 (7–3–0) |
| January 3 | 7:00 PM | USNTDP* | #1 | Yost Ice Arena • Ann Arbor, MI (Exhibition) | B1G+ | Peck | W 7–5 | 5,326 | — |
| January 9 | 7:00 PM | Notre Dame | #1 | Yost Ice Arena • Ann Arbor, MI (Rivalry) | B1G+ | Ivankovic | W 5–2 | 5,800 | 17–4–0 (8–3–0) |
| January 10 | 7:00 PM | Notre Dame | #1 | Yost Ice Arena • Ann Arbor, MI (Rivalry) | B1G+ | Peck | W 7–4 | 5,800 | 18–4–0 (9–3–0) |
| January 16 | 8:00 PM | at Minnesota | #1 | 3M Arena at Mariucci • Minneapolis, MN | B1G+ | Peck | W 5–1 | 9,948 | 19–4–0 (10–3–0) |
| January 17 | 8:00 PM | at Minnesota | #1 | 3M Arena at Mariucci • Minneapolis, MN | B1G+ | Peck | W 3–2 ^{OT} | 9,852 | 20–4–0 (11–3–0) |
| January 30 | 6:30 PM | at Ohio State | #1 | Value City Arena • Columbus, OH (Rivalry) | B1G+ | Peck | W 6–4 | 7,659 | 21–4–0 (12–3–0) |
| January 31 | 5:00 PM | at Ohio State | #1 | Value City Arena • Columbus, OH (Rivalry) | B1G+ | Peck | W 3–2 ^{OT} | 8,188 | 22–4–0 (13–3–0) |
| February 6 | 7:00 PM | #2 Michigan State | #1 | Yost Ice Arena • Ann Arbor, MI (Rivalry) | FS1 | Peck | W 4–3 ^{OT} | 5,800 | 23–4–0 (14–3–0) |
| February 7 | 6:30 PM | vs. #2 Michigan State | #1 | Little Caesars Arena • Detroit, MI (Duel in the D) | BTN | Ivankovic | L 2–5 | 19,405 | 23–5–0 (14–4–0) |
| February 13 | 6:30 PM | #6 Penn State | #2 | Yost Ice Arena • Ann Arbor, MI | B1G+ | Ivankovic | T 4–4 ^{SOW} | 5,800 | 23–5–1 (14–4–1) |
| February 14 | 5:00 PM | #6 Penn State | #2 | Yost Ice Arena • Ann Arbor, MI | BTN | Ivankovic | W 6–3 | 5,800 | 24–5–1 (15–4–1) |
| February 20 | 8:00 PM | at #13 Wisconsin | #2 | Kohl Center • Madison, WI | B1G+ | Ivankovic | L 1–4 | 12,633 | 24–6–1 (15–5–1) |
| February 21 | 7:00 PM | at #13 Wisconsin | #2 | Kohl Center • Madison, WI | B1G+ | Ivankovic | W 3–1 | 15,511 | 25–6–1 (16–5–1) |
| February 26 | 6:30 PM | Minnesota | #2 | Yost Ice Arena • Ann Arbor, MI | BTN | Ivankovic | L 2–4 | 5,547 | 25–7–1 (16–6–1) |
| February 27 | 6:00 PM | Minnesota | #2 | Yost Ice Arena • Ann Arbor, MI | BTN | Ivankovic | W 4–2 | 5,800 | 26–7–1 (17–6–1) |
| March 5 | 7:00 PM | Simon Fraser* | #1 | Yost Ice Arena • Ann Arbor, MI (Exhibition) | B1G+ | Ivankovic | W 8–1 | 4,309 | — |
Big Ten Tournament
| March 11 | 7:00 PM | Notre Dame | #1 | Yost Ice Arena • Ann Arbor, Michigan (Quarterfinal) | B1G+ | Ivankovic | W 6–1 | 5,347 | 27–7–1 |
| March 14 | 5:00 PM | #10 Penn State | #1 | Yost Ice Arena • Ann Arbor, Michigan (Semifinal) | BTN | Ivankovic | W 5–2 | 5,800 | 28–7–1 |
| March 21 | 8:00 PM | #19 Ohio State | #1 | Yost Ice Arena • Ann Arbor, Michigan (Championship) | BTN | Ivankovic | W 7–3 | 5,800 | 29–7–1 |
NCAA Tournament
| March 27 | 5:30 PM | vs. #20 Bentley | #1 | MVP Arena • Albany, NY (Regional semifinal) | ESPNU | Ivankovic | W 5–1 | 5,237 | 30–7–1 |
| March 29 | 5:00 PM | vs. #6 Minnesota Duluth | #1 | MVP Arena • Albany, NY (Regional final) | ESPN | Ivankovic | W 4–3 | 5,751 | 31–7–1 |
| April 9 | 8:30 PM | vs. #4 Denver | #1 | T-Mobile Arena • Las Vegas, NV (National semifinal) | ESPN2 | Ivankovic | L 3–4 ^{2OT} | 17,942 | 31–8–1 |
*Non-conference game. ^{#}Rankings from USCHO.com Poll. All times are in Eastern Time. Source:

== Rankings ==
Ranking movements Legend: ██ Increase in ranking ██ Decrease in ranking ( ) = First-place votes
| | Week | | | | | | | | | | | | | | | | | | | | | | | | | | | |
| Poll | Pre | 1 | 2 | 3 | 4 | 5 | 6 | 7 | 8 | 9 | 10 | 11 | 12 | 13 | 14 | 15 | 16 | 17 | 18 | 19 | 20 | 21 | 22 | 23 | 24 | 25 | 26 | Final |
|---|---|---|---|---|---|---|---|---|---|---|---|---|---|---|---|---|---|---|---|---|---|---|---|---|---|---|---|---|
| USCHO.com | 12 (1) | 9 (1) | 4 (8) | 3 (11) | 2 (2) | 2 (5) | 2 | 2 | 1 (42) | 1 (42) | 1 (26) | 1 (36) | * | 1 (38) | 1 (46) | 1 (46) | 1 (46) | 1 (48) | 1 (48) | 2 (18) | 2 (10) | 2 (1) | 1 (24) | 1 (30) | 1 (50) | 1 (50) | 1 (50) | 3 |
| USA Hockey | 12 (1) | 7 (1) | 3 (9) | 3 (12) | 2 (2) | 2 (4) | 2 | 2 | 1 (34) | 1 (33) | 1 (17) | 1 (29) | * | 1 (30) | 1 (34) | 1 (34) | 1 (34) | 1 (34) | 1 (34) | 2 (15) | 2 (7) | 2 (4) | 1 (26) | 1 (21) | 1 (34) | 1 (34) | 1 (28) | 3 |

Note: USCHO did not release a poll in week 12.
Note: USA Hockey did not release a poll in week 12.

== Awards and honors ==
Weekly Awards
| Player | Award | Date Awarded | Ref. |
|---|---|---|---|
| Michael Hage | Big Ten Second Star of the Week | October 7, 2025 | |
| Jack Ivankovic | Big Ten Third Star of the Week | October 14, 2025 | |
| Will Horcoff | Big Ten Third Star of the Week | November 4, 2025 | |
| T. J. Hughes | Big Ten First Star of the Week | November 25, 2025 | |
| Will Horcoff | Big Ten First Star of the Week | December 2, 2025 | |
| Michael Hage | Big Ten Third Star of the Week | December 2, 2025 | |
| Nick Moldenhauer | Big Ten First Star of the Week | January 13, 2026 | |
| Stephen Peck | Big Ten Second Star of the Week | January 20, 2026 | |

== Players drafted into the NHL ==
Michigan had seven players drafted in the 2025 NHL entry draft, tying a program record for most players selected in an NHL Draft.

| Year | Round | Pick | Player | NHL team |
|---|---|---|---|---|
| 2025 | 1 | 24 | Will Horcoff | Pittsburgh Penguins |
| 2025 | 2 | 43 | Malcolm Spence | New York Rangers |
| 2025 | 2 | 53 | Cole McKinney | San Jose Sharks |
| 2025 | 2 | 58 | Jack Ivankovic | Nashville Predators |
| 2025 | 4 | 101 | Drew Schock | Anaheim Ducks |
| 2025 | 5 | 131 | Asher Barnett | Edmonton Oilers |
| 2025 | 7 | 223 | Aidan Park | Edmonton Oilers |
