= 2024–25 Michigan Wolverines men's ice hockey season =

- Conference: Big Ten
- Home ice: Yost Ice Arena

Rankings
- USCHO: #17
- USA Today: #17

Record
- Overall: 18–15–3
- Conference: 12–10–2
- Home: 9–6–1
- Road: 9–7–2
- Neutral: 0–2–0

Coaches and captains
- Head coach: Brandon Naurato
- Assistant coaches: Rob Rassey; Mathew Deschamps; Kevin Reiter
- Captain: Jacob Truscott
- Alternate captain(s): T. J. Hughes; Ethan Edwards

Jacob Truscott (photographed during a January 2025 game) served as the team's captain

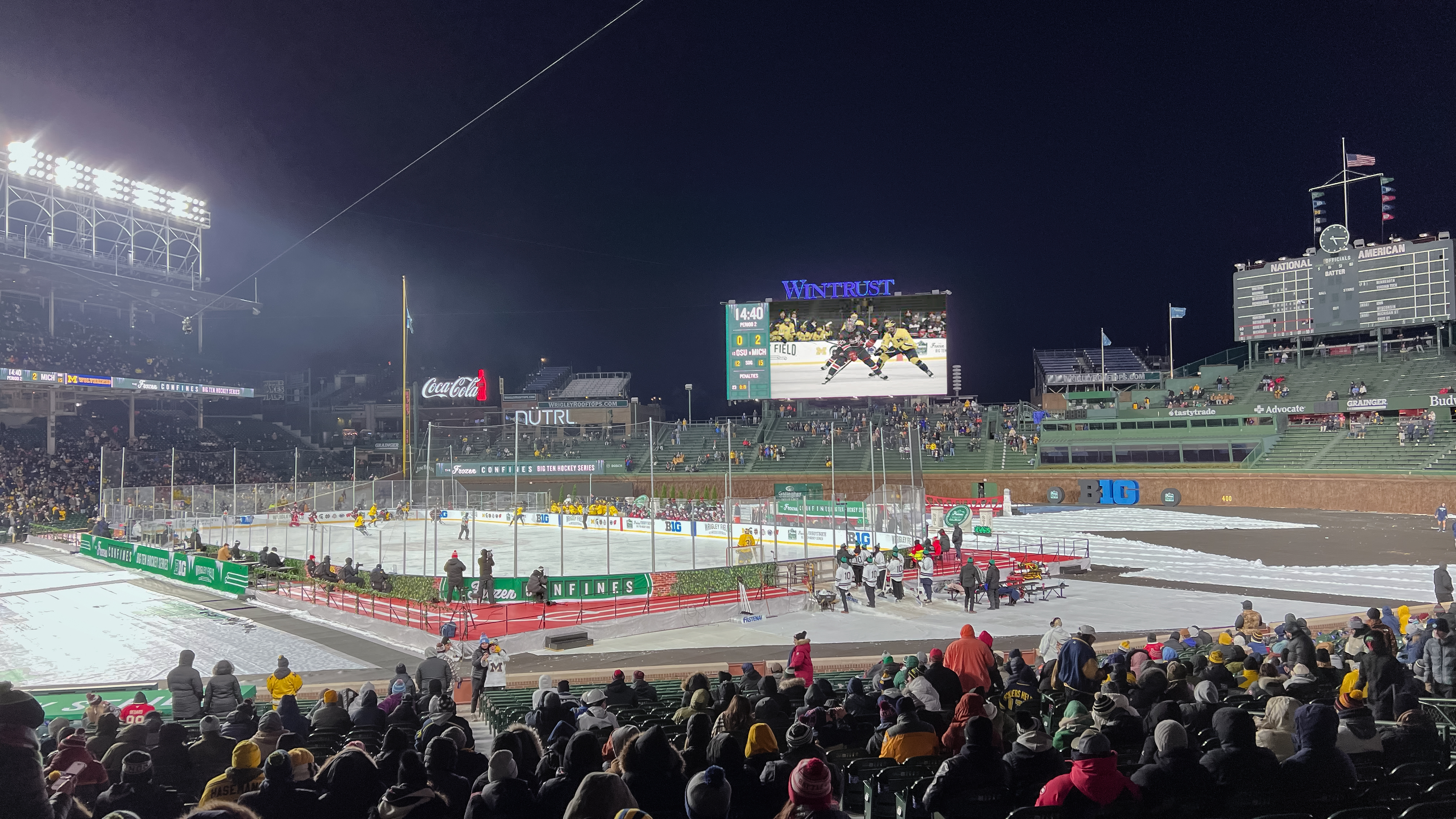
Frozen Confines game at Wrigley Field in Chicago against the Ohio State Buckeyes on January 3, 2025

The 2024–25 Michigan Wolverines men's hockey team was the Wolverines' 103nd season of play. They represented the University of Michigan in the 2024–25 NCAA Division I men's ice hockey season. They were coached by Brandon Naurato, in his third year as head coach, and played their home games at Yost Ice Arena.

== Previous season ==
During the 2023–24 season, Michigan went 23–15–3, including 11–11–2 in Big Ten play. They received an at-large bid to the 2024 NCAA Division I men's ice hockey tournament, where they reached their NCAA record 28th Frozen Four and were eliminated in the semifinals by Boston College.

== Departures ==
| Player | Position | Nationality | Cause |
|---|---|---|---|
| Jacob Barczewski | Goaltender | United States | Graduation (signed with Colorado Eagles) |
| Gavin Brindley | Forward | United States | Signed professional contract (Columbus Blue Jackets) |
| Seamus Casey | Defenseman | United States | Signed professional contract (New Jersey Devils) |
| Dylan Duke | Forward | United States | Signed professional contract (Tampa Bay Lightning) |
| Steve Holtz | Defenseman | United States | Graduation (signed with Kalamazoo Wings) |
| Rutger McGroarty | Forward | United States | Signed professional contract (Pittsburgh Penguins) |
| Frank Nazar | Forward | United States | Signed professional contract (Chicago Blackhawks) |
| Chase Pletzke | Forward | United States | Graduation |
| Marshall Warren | Defenseman | United States | Signed professional contract (New York Islanders) |
| Noah West | Goaltender | United States | Graduate transfer to Ferris State |

== Recruiting ==
| Player | Position | Nationality | Age | Notes |
|---|---|---|---|---|
| Thomas Daskas | Forward | United States | 24 | Rochester, MI; transfer from Miami (Ohio) |
| Will Felicio | Defenseman | United States | 18 | Holden, MA |
| Miles Gust | Defenseman | United States | 20 | Chicago, IL |
| Hunter Hady | Defenseman | United States | 20 | Rochester, MN |
| Michael Hage | Forward | Canada | 18 | Mississauga, ON |
| Christian Humphreys | Forward | United States | 18 | Pittsburgh, PA |
| Cameron Korpi | Goaltender | United States | 20 | South Lyon, MI |
| Tim Lovell | Defenseman | United States | 22 | Hingham, MA; transfer from Arizona State |
| Dakoda Rhéaume-Mullen | Goaltender | United States | 17 | Northville, MI |
| Logan Stein | Goaltender | United States | 23 | Suwanee, GA; transfer from Ferris State |
| Evan Werner | Goaltender | United States | 21 | Flower Mound, TX; transfer from Colorado College |
| William Whitelaw | Forward | United States | 19 | Rosemount, MN; transfer from Wisconsin |

== Roster ==
As of January 3, 2025.

| No. | Nat. | Player | Class | Pos | Height | Weight | DoB | Hometown | Previous team | NHL rights |
|---|---|---|---|---|---|---|---|---|---|---|
| 1 | (United States) | Logan Stein | Graduate | G | 6' 2" (1.88 m) | 210 lb (95 kg) | 2001-04-26 | Suwanee, Georgia | Ferris State (CCHL) | — |
| 3 | (United States) | Hunter Hady | Freshman | D | 6' 4" (1.93 m) | 205 lb (93 kg) | 2004-08-02 | Rochester, Minnesota | Chicago (USHL) | — |
| 4 | (United States) | Will Felicio | Freshman | D | 5' 10" (1.78 m) | 161 lb (73 kg) | 2006-05-19 | Holden, Massachusetts | Waterloo (USHL) | — |
| 5 | (United States) | Tyler Duke | Junior | D | 5' 9" (1.75 m) | 180 lb (82 kg) | 2004-07-19 | Strongsville, Ohio | Ohio State (Big Ten) | — |
| 6 | (United States) | Josh Eernisse | Junior | F | 6' 2" (1.88 m) | 205 lb (93 kg) | 2004-12-31 | Apple Valley, Minnesota | St. Thomas (CCHA) | — |
| 7 | (United States) | Dakoda Rheaume-Mullen | Freshman | D | 6' 0" (1.83 m) | 180 lb (82 kg) | 2006-12-18 | Northville, Michigan | USNTDP (USHL) | — |
| 8 | (United States) | William Whitelaw | Sophomore | F | 5' 9" (1.75 m) | 175 lb (79 kg) | 2005-02-05 | Rosemount, Minnesota | Wisconsin (Big Ten) | CBJ, 66th overall 2023 |
| 9 | (Canada) | Nick Moldenhauer | Sophomore | F | 5' 10" (1.78 m) | 175 lb (79 kg) | 2004-05-25 | Mississauga, Ontario | Chicago (USHL) | TOR, 95th overall 2022 |
| 10 | (United States) | Thomas Daskas | Graduate | D | 6' 2" (1.88 m) | 200 lb (91 kg) | 1999-09-03 | Rochester Hills, Michigan | Miami (Ohio) (NCHC) | — |
| 13 | (Canada) | T. J. Hughes (A) | Junior | F | 6' 0" (1.83 m) | 185 lb (84 kg) | 2001-11-09 | Hamilton, Ontario | Brooks (AJHL) | — |
| 15 | (United States) | Jacob Truscott (C) | Graduate | D | 6' 1" (1.85 m) | 185 lb (84 kg) | 2002-04-12 | Port Huron, Michigan | USNTDP (USHL) | VAN, 144th overall 2020 |
| 17 | (United States) | Garrett Schifsky | Sophomore | F | 5' 9" (1.75 m) | 174 lb (79 kg) | 2003-04-08 | Andover, Minnesota | Waterloo (USHL) | — |
| 19 | (Canada) | Michael Hage | Freshman | F | 6' 1" (1.85 m) | 190 lb (86 kg) | 2006-04-14 | Oakville, Ontario | Chicago (USHL) | MTL, 21st overall 2024 |
| 20 | (United States) | Tanner Rowe | Sophomore | F | 6' 1" (1.85 m) | 179 lb (81 kg) | 2002-08-26 | Calumet, Michigan | Omaha (USHL) | — |
| 21 | (United States) | Jackson Hallum | Junior | F | 6' 0" (1.83 m) | 183 lb (83 kg) | 2002-09-08 | Eagan, Minnesota | Dubuque (USHL) | VGK, 91st overall 2020 |
| 22 | (United States) | Philippe Lapointe | Graduate | F | 5' 11" (1.8 m) | 185 lb (84 kg) | 2000-02-29 | Novi, Michigan | Trail (BCHL) | — |
| 23 | (United States) | Miles Gust | Freshman | D | 5' 10" (1.78 m) | 175 lb (79 kg) | 2004-03-17 | Chicago, Illinois | Muskegon (USHL) | — |
| 24 | (United States) | Christian Humphreys | Freshman | D | 5' 11" (1.8 m) | 170 lb (77 kg) | 2006-02-04 | Pittsburgh, Pennsylvania | USNTDP (USHL) | COL, 215th overall 2024 |
| 27 | (United States) | Tim Lovell | Graduate | D | 5' 10" (1.78 m) | 165 lb (75 kg) | 2002-02-08 | Hingham, Massachusetts | Arizona State (NCHC) | — |
| 29 | (Canada) | Andrew Albano | Graduate | G | 6' 0" (1.83 m) | 171 lb (78 kg) | 1998-11-09 | Hamilton, Ontario | Norwich (NEHC) | — |
| 31 | (United States) | Cameron Korpi | Freshman | G | 6' 4" (1.93 m) | 172 lb (78 kg) | 2004-05-26 | South Lyon, Michigan | Tri-City (USHL) | — |
| 33 | (United States) | Kienan Draper | Junior | F | 6' 0" (1.83 m) | 183 lb (83 kg) | 2002-02-19 | Bloomfield Hills, Michigan | Chilliwack (BCHL) | DET, 187th overall 2020 |
| 44 | (United States) | Will Horcoff | Freshman | F | 6' 4" (1.93 m) | 181 lb (82 kg) | 2007-01-23 | Birmingham, Michigan | USNTDP (USHL) | — |
| 63 | (Canada) | Luca Fantilli | Junior | D | 6' 0" (1.83 m) | 183 lb (83 kg) | 2002-12-30 | Nobleton, Ontario | Chicago (USHL) | — |
| 68 | (Canada) | Josh Orrico | Sophomore | D | 5' 9" (1.75 m) | 165 lb (75 kg) | 2003-06-15 | Woodbridge, Ontario | Janesville (NAHL) | — |
| 73 | (Canada) | Ethan Edwards (A) | Senior | D | 5' 11" (1.8 m) | 190 lb (86 kg) | 2002-06-06 | St. Albert, Alberta | Sioux City (USHL) | NJD, 120th overall 2020 |
| 91 | (United States) | Evan Werner | Sophomore | F | 5' 8" (1.73 m) | 175 lb (79 kg) | 2003-02-13 | Flower Mound, Texas | Colorado College (NCHC) | — |
| 94 | (United States) | Mark Estapa | Senior | F | 6' 2" (1.88 m) | 206 lb (93 kg) | 2002-01-13 | St. Clair, Michigan | Tri-City (USHL) | — |

== Coaching staff ==
| Name | Position coached | Seasons at Michigan |
|---|---|---|
| Brandon Naurato | Head coach | 3rd |
| Rob Rassey | Associate head coach | 2nd |
| Mathew Deschamps | Assistant coach | 2nd |
| Kevin Reiter | Assistant coach | 2nd |
| Evan Hall | Director of Hockey Operations | 2nd |
| Joe Maher | Head Strength and Conditioning Coach | 7th |

== Standings ==
2024–25 Big Ten ice hockey Standings
| | Conference record | | | | | | | | | | Overall record | | | | | |
| | GP | W | L | T | OTW | OTL | 3/SW | PTS | GF | GA | GP | W | L | T | GF | GA |
|---|---|---|---|---|---|---|---|---|---|---|---|---|---|---|---|---|
| #6 Michigan State †* | 24 | 15 | 5 | 4 | 2 | 1 | 2 | 50 | 92 | 60 | 37 | 26 | 7 | 4 | 129 | 77 |
| #9 Minnesota † | 24 | 15 | 6 | 3 | 1 | 3 | 0 | 50 | 87 | 62 | 40 | 25 | 11 | 4 | 154 | 101 |
| #11 Ohio State | 24 | 14 | 9 | 1 | 3 | 2 | 0 | 42 | 72 | 62 | 40 | 24 | 14 | 2 | 127 | 106 |
| #17 Michigan | 24 | 12 | 10 | 2 | 5 | 1 | 2 | 36 | 76 | 83 | 36 | 18 | 15 | 3 | 112 | 118 |
| #5 Penn State | 24 | 9 | 11 | 4 | 2 | 1 | 3 | 33 | 78 | 88 | 40 | 22 | 14 | 4 | 139 | 120 |
| Wisconsin | 24 | 7 | 16 | 1 | 1 | 6 | 0 | 27 | 64 | 77 | 37 | 13 | 21 | 3 | 108 | 110 |
| Notre Dame | 24 | 4 | 19 | 1 | 2 | 2 | 1 | 14 | 60 | 97 | 38 | 12 | 25 | 1 | 102 | 127 |
Championship: March 22, 2025 † indicates conference regular season champion * indicates conference tournament champion Rankings: USCHO.com Top 20 Poll

== Schedule and results ==
| Date | Time | Opponent^{#} | Rank^{#} | Site | TV | Decision | Result | Attendance | Record |
Regular season
| October 4 | 7:00 PM | Minnesota State* | #7 | Yost Ice Arena • Ann Arbor, MI | B1G+ | Stein | L 2–5 | 5,274 | 0–1–0 |
| October 5 | 6:00 PM | Minnesota State* | #7 | Yost Ice Arena • Ann Arbor, MI | B1G+ | Korpi | W 4–1 | 5,207 | 1–1–0 |
| October 11 | 5:30 PM | at Arizona State* | #10 | Mullett Arena • Tempe, AZ | NCHC.tv | Stein | W 4–1 | 4,500 | 2–1–0 |
| October 12 | 7:00 PM | at Arizona State* | #10 | Mullett Arena • Tempe, AZ | NCHC.tv | Korpi | T 3–3 ^{SOL} | 5,354 | 2–1–1 |
| October 18 | 7:00 PM | #13 St. Cloud State* | #10 | Yost Ice Arena • Ann Arbor, MI | B1G+ | Stein | W 3–0 | 5,800 | 3–1–1 |
| October 19 | 7:00 PM | #13 St. Cloud State* | #10 | Yost Ice Arena • Ann Arbor, MI | B1G+ | Korpi | L 0–4 | 5,800 | 3–2–1 |
| October 25 | 7:00 PM | USNTDP* | #10 | Yost Ice Arena • Ann Arbor, MI (Exhibition) | B1G+ | Albano | W 5–4 ^{OT} | 5,800 | — |
| November 1 | 7:00 PM | at #5 Boston University* | #11 | Agganis Arena • Boston, MA | ESPN+ | Stein | W 5–1 | 6,010 | 4–2–1 |
| November 2 | 7:00 PM | at #5 Boston University* | #11 | Agganis Arena • Boston, MA | ESPN+ | Korpi | W 5–4 ^{OT} | 6,150 | 5–2–1 |
| November 8 | 6:00 PM | #20 Notre Dame | #7 | Yost Ice Arena • Ann Arbor, MI (Rivalry) | B1G+ | Stein | W 2–1 ^{OT} | 5,800 | 6–2–1 (1–0–0) |
| November 9 | 7:00 PM | #20 Notre Dame | #7 | Yost Ice Arena • Ann Arbor, MI (Rivalry) | B1G+ | Korpi | W 4–2 | 5,800 | 7–2–1 (2–0–0) |
| November 22 | 7:00 PM | at Penn State | #5 | Pegula Ice Arena • University Park, PA | B1G+ | Stein | W 6–5 | 5,592 | 8–2–1 (3–0–0) |
| November 23 | 7:30 PM | at Penn State | #5 | Pegula Ice Arena • University Park, PA | B1G+ | Stein | W 10–6 | 5,919 | 9–2–1 (4–0–0) |
| November 29 | 7:00 PM | at #7 Western Michigan* | #6 | Lawson Arena • Kalamazoo, MI | NCHC.tv | Stein | L 1–4 | 3,974 | 9–3–1 |
| November 30 | 7:00 PM | #7 Western Michigan* | #6 | Yost Ice Arena • Ann Arbor, MI | B1G+ | Korpi | W 2–1 | 5,800 | 10–3–1 |
| December 6 | 6:00 PM | at #4 Minnesota | #6 | 3M Arena at Mariucci • Minneapolis, MN | FS1 | Stein | L 0–6 | 9,198 | 10–4–1 (4–1–0) |
| December 7 | 8:00 PM | at #4 Minnesota | #6 | 3M Arena at Mariucci • Minneapolis, MN | B1G+ | Korpi | L 0–2 | 9,764 | 10–5–1 (4–2–0) |
| December 13 | 6:00 PM | Wisconsin | #8 | Yost Ice Arena • Ann Arbor, MI | BTN | Stein | L 0–4 | 5,800 | 10–6–1 (4–3–0) |
| December 14 | 7:00 PM | Wisconsin | #8 | Yost Ice Arena • Ann Arbor, MI | B1G+ | Korpi | W 3–2 ^{OT} | 5,800 | 11–6–1 (5–3–0) |
| January 3 | 4:00 PM | vs. #13 Ohio State | #9 | Wrigley Field • Chicago, IL (Frozen Confines) | BTN | Korpi | L 3–4 | — | 11–7–1 (5–4–0) |
| January 5 | 5:00 PM | #13 Ohio State | #9 | Yost Ice Arena • Ann Arbor, MI (Rivalry) | B1G+ | Stein | W 3–2 ^{OT} | 5,800 | 12–7–1 (6–4–0) |
| January 10 | 7:00 PM | at Notre Dame | #9 | Compton Family Ice Arena • Notre Dame, IN (Rivalry) | Peacock | Stein | W 5–3 | 4,683 | 13–7–1 (7–4–0) |
| January 11 | 6:00 PM | at Notre Dame | #9 | Compton Family Ice Arena • Notre Dame, IN (Rivalry) | Peacock | Korpi | L 4–7 | 4,969 | 13–8–1 (7–5–0) |
| January 17 | 7:00 PM | #1 Michigan State | #10 | Yost Ice Arena • Ann Arbor, MI (Rivalry) | B1G+ | Stein | W 3–2 ^{OT} | 5,800 | 14–8–1 (8–5–0) |
| January 18 | 6:00 PM | at #1 Michigan State | #10 | Munn Ice Arena • East Lansing, MI (Rivalry) | BTN | Stein | L 1–4 | 6,555 | 14–9–1 (8–6–0) |
| January 24 | 8:00 PM | at Wisconsin | #10 | Kohl Center • Madison, WI | B1G+ | Korpi | L 4–5 | 11,093 | 14–10–1 (8–7–0) |
| January 25 | 8:30 PM | at Wisconsin | #10 | Kohl Center • Madison, WI | BTN | Stein | T 4–4 ^{SOW} | 13,063 | 14–10–2 (8–7–1) |
| January 31 | 7:00 PM | Penn State | #13 | Yost Ice Arena • Ann Arbor, MI | B1G+ | Stein | L 4–5 | 5,800 | 14–11–2 (8–8–1) |
| February 1 | 6:00 PM | Penn State | #13 | Yost Ice Arena • Ann Arbor, MI | BTN | Korpi | W 7–3 | 5,800 | 15–11–2 (9–8–1) |
| February 7 | 7:00 PM | at #2 Michigan State | #13 | Munn Ice Arena • East Lansing, MI (Rivalry) | B1G+ | Korpi | W 2–1 | 6,555 | 16–11–2 (10–8–1) |
| February 8 | 8:00 PM | vs. #2 Michigan State | #13 | Little Caesars Arena • Detroit, MI (Duel in the D) | BTN | Korpi | L 1–6 | 19,515 | 16–12–2 (10–9–1) |
| February 14 | 7:00 PM | #4 Minnesota | #12 | Yost Ice Arena • Ann Arbor, MI | B1G+ | Korpi | W 3–2 ^{OT} | 5,800 | 17–12–2 (11–9–1) |
| February 15 | 6:00 PM | #4 Minnesota | #12 | Yost Ice Arena • Ann Arbor, MI | BTN | Stein | T 2–2 ^{SOW} | 5,800 | 17–12–3 (11–9–2) |
| February 27 | 8:00 PM | at #8 Ohio State | #11 | Value City Arena • Columbus, OH (Rivalry) | BTN | Stein | L 1–2 ^{OT} | 7,523 | 17–13–3 (11–10–2) |
| February 28 | 6:00 PM | at #8 Ohio State | #11 | Value City Arena • Columbus, OH (Rivalry) | BTN | Stein | W 4–3 | 9,225 | 18–13–3 (12–10–2) |
Big Ten Tournament
| March 7 | 7:00 PM | #15 Penn State | #11 | Yost Ice Arena • Ann Arbor, MI (Quarterfinals) | B1G+ | Stein | L 5–6 ^{OT} | 4,734 | 18–14–3 |
| March 8 | 7:00 PM | #15 Penn State | #11 | Yost Ice Arena • Ann Arbor, MI (Quarterfinals) | B1G+ | Stein | L 2–5 | 5,341 | 18–15–3 |
*Non-conference game. ^{#}Rankings from USCHO.com Poll. All times are in Eastern Time. Source:

== Rankings ==
| Poll | Week | | | | | | | | | | | | | | | | | | | | | | | | | | | |
| Poll | Pre | 1 | 2 | 3 | 4 | 5 | 6 | 7 | 8 | 9 | 10 | 11 | 12 | 13 | 14 | 15 | 16 | 17 | 18 | 19 | 20 | 21 | 22 | 23 | 24 | 25 | 26 | 27 (Final) |
|---|---|---|---|---|---|---|---|---|---|---|---|---|---|---|---|---|---|---|---|---|---|---|---|---|---|---|---|---|
| USCHO.com | 7 | 10 | 10 | 10 | 11 | 7 | 5 | 5т | 6 | 6 | 8 | 9 | – | 9 | 9 | 10 | 10 | 13 | 13 | 12 | 10 | 11 | 11 | 16 | 16 | 17 | – | 17 |
| USA Today | 8 | 13 | 9 | 11 | 11 | 7 | 6 | 5 | 6 | 6 | 8 | 8 | – | 9 | 9 | 10 | 10 | 12 | 13 | 12 | 11 | 11 | 11 | 15 | 16 | 17 | 17 | 17 |

Note: USCHO did not release a poll in week 12 or 26.
Note: USA Hockey did not release a poll in week 12.

== Awards and honors ==
Weekly Awards
| Player | Award | Date Awarded | Ref. |
|---|---|---|---|
| Evan Werner | Big Ten First Star of the Week | November 5, 2024 | |
| Jackson Hallum | Big Ten Second Star of the Week | November 5, 2024 | |
| Evan Werner | Big Ten Third Star of the Week | November 12, 2024 | |
| Michael Hage | Big Ten First Star of the Week | November 26, 2024 | |
| T. J. Hughes | Big Ten Second Star of the Week | November 26, 2024 | |
| Will Felicio | Big Ten Third Star of the Week | February 4, 2025 | |
| Logan Stein | Big Ten Third Star of the Week | February 18, 2025 | |

| Player | Award | Ref |
|---|---|---|
| Michael Hage | Big Ten Freshman of the Year | |
| Ethan Edwards | All-Big Ten Second Team | |
| T. J. Hughes | All-Big Ten Second Team | |
| Michael Hage | All-Big Ten Freshman Team | |
| Cameron Korpi | All-Big Ten Freshman Team | |

== Players drafted into the NHL ==
Michigan had two players drafted in the 2024 NHL entry draft. Michael Hage was drafted 21st overall, while Christian Humphreys was drafted 215th overall.

| Year | Round | Pick | Player | NHL team |
|---|---|---|---|---|
| 2024 | 1 | 21 | Michael Hage | Montreal Canadiens |
| 2024 | 7 | 215 | Christian Humphreys | Colorado Avalanche |
