= List of current NCAA Division I men's ice hockey coaches =

There are 64 men's college ice hockey programs competing in the National Collegiate Athletic Association's Division I. Each program employs a head coach. As of the upcoming 2025–26 season, the longest-tenured head coach is expected to be Rick Gotkin of Mercyhurst, who has been head coach since 1988.

== List of coaches ==
Conference affiliations are current for the next men's hockey season of 2026–27.

Coach	Team	Conference	First season
Frank Serratore	Air Force Falcons	AHA	1997–98
Erik Largen	Alaska Nanooks	Independent	2018–19
Eric Rud	Alaska Anchorage Seawolves	Independent	2026–27
Dave Hakstol	Arizona State Sun Devils	NCHC	2026–27
Zach McKelvie	Army Black Knights	AHA	2025–26
Garrett Raboin	Augustana Vikings	CCHA	2023–24
Tom Serratore	Bemidji State Beavers	CCHA	2001–02
Andy Jones	Bentley Falcons	AHA	2023–24
Greg Brown	Boston College Eagles	Hockey East	2022–23
Jay Pandolfo	Boston University Terriers	Hockey East	2022–23
Dennis Williams	Bowling Green Falcons	CCHA	2024–25
Tom Upton	Brown Bears	ECAC	2026–27
Trevor Large	Canisius Golden Griffins	AHA	2017–18
Jean-François Houle	Clarkson Golden Knights	ECAC	2024–25
Mike Harder	Colgate Raiders	ECAC	2023–24
Kris Mayotte	Colorado College Tigers	NCHC	2021–22
Casey Jones	Cornell Big Red	ECAC	2025–26
Reid Cashman	Dartmouth Big Green	ECAC	2020–21
David Carle	Denver Pioneers	NCHC	2018–19
Brett Riley	Ferris State Bulldogs	CCHA	2025–26
Rob Rassey	Harvard Crimson	ECAC	2026–27
Bill Riga	Holy Cross Crusaders	AHA	2021–22
Damon Whitten	Lake Superior State Lakers	CCHA	2014–15
Keith Fisher	Lindenwood Lions	Independent	2025–26
Brendan Riley	LIU Sharks	Independent	2025–26
Ben Barr	Maine Black Bears	Hockey East	2021–22
Scott Borek	Merrimack Warriors	Hockey East	2018–19
Anthony Noreen	Miami RedHawks	NCHC	2024–25
Brandon Naurato	Michigan Wolverines	Big Ten	2022–23
Adam Nightingale	Michigan State Spartans	Big Ten	2022–23
Bill Muckalt	Michigan Tech Huskies	CCHA	2025–26
Brett Larson	Minnesota Golden Gophers	Big Ten	2026–27
Scott Sandelin	Minnesota Duluth Bulldogs	NCHC	2000–01
Luke Strand	Minnesota State Mavericks	CCHA	2023–24
Michael Souza	New Hampshire Wildcats	Hockey East	2018–19
Jason Lammers	Niagara Purple Eagles	AHA	2017–18
Dane Jackson	North Dakota Fighting Hawks	NCHC	2025–26
Jerry Keefe	Northeastern Huskies	Hockey East	2021–22
Dave Shyiak	Northern Michigan Wildcats	CCHA	2024–25
Brock Sheahan	Notre Dame Fighting Irish	Big Ten	2025–26
Steve Rohlik	Ohio State Buckeyes	Big Ten	2013–14
Mike Gabinet	Omaha Mavericks	NCHC	2017–18
Guy Gadowsky	Penn State Nittany Lions	Big Ten	2012–13
Ben Syer	Princeton Tigers	ECAC	2024–25
Nate Leaman	Providence Friars	Hockey East	2011–12
Rand Pecknold	Quinnipiac Bobcats	ECAC	1994–95
Matt Thomas	RIT Tigers	AHA	2025–26
Derek Schooley	Robert Morris Colonials	AHA	2004–05
Eric Lang	RPI Engineers	ECAC	2025–26
C. J. Marottolo	Sacred Heart Pioneers	AHA	2009–10
Nick Oliver	St. Cloud State Huskies	NCHC	2026–27
Brent Brekke	St. Lawrence Saints	ECAC	2019–20
Enrico Blasi	St. Thomas Tommies	NCHC	2021–22
David Berard	Stonehill Skyhawks	Independent	2024–25
Mike Cavanaugh	UConn Huskies	Hockey East	2013–14
Greg Carvel	UMass Minutemen	Hockey East	2016–17
Norm Bazin	UMass Lowell River Hawks	Hockey East	2011–12
Josh Hauge	Union Garnet Chargers	ECAC	2022–23
Steve Wiedler	Vermont Catamounts	Hockey East	2023–24
Pat Ferschweiler	Western Michigan Broncos	NCHC	2021–22
Mike Hastings	Wisconsin Badgers	Big Ten	2023–24
Jeff Hamilton	Yale Bulldogs	ECAC	2026–27

== See also ==
- List of current NCAA Division I baseball coaches
- List of current NCAA Division I men's basketball coaches
- List of current NCAA Division I women's basketball coaches
- List of current NCAA Division I FBS football coaches
- List of current NCAA Division I FCS football coaches
- List of NCAA Division I men's soccer coaches
