= 2022–23 Michigan Wolverines men's ice hockey season =

Big Ten Tournament, Champion NCAA Tournament, National semifinal
- Conference: 2nd Big Ten
- Home ice: Yost Ice Arena

Rankings
- USCHO: #3
- USA Today: #3

Record
- Overall: 26–12–3
- Conference: 12–10–2
- Home: 14–5–2
- Road: 9–5–1
- Neutral: 2–2–0

Coaches and captains
- Head coach: Brandon Naurato
- Assistant coaches: Bill Muckalt; Rob Rassey
- Captain: Nolan Moyle
- Alternate captain(s): Keaton Pehrson; Jacob Truscott; Luke Hughes

The 2022–23 Michigan Wolverines men's hockey team was the Wolverines' 101st season of play. They represented the University of Michigan in the 2022–23 NCAA Division I men's ice hockey season. They were coached by Brandon Naurato, in his first year as head coach, and played their home games at Yost Ice Arena.

== Previous season ==
During the 2021–22 season, Michigan went 31–10–1, including 16–8–0 in Big Ten play. They won the 2022 Big Ten Men's Ice Hockey Tournament and received an automatic bid to the 2022 NCAA Division I Men's Ice Hockey Tournament, where they reached their NCAA record 26th Frozen Four and were eliminated in the semifinals by eventual national champion Denver.

== Departures ==
Player	Position	Nationality	Cause
Johnny Beecher	Forward	United States	Signed professional contract (Boston Bruins)
Matty Beniers	Forward	United States	Signed professional contract (Seattle Kraken)
Nick Blankenburg	Defenseman	United States	Graduation (signed with Columbus Blue Jackets)
Thomas Bordeleau	Forward	United States	Signed professional contract (San Jose Sharks)
Brendan Brisson	Forward	United States	Signed professional contract (Vegas Golden Knights)
Jake Gingell	Defenseman	United States	Graduation
Kent Johnson	Forward	Canada	Signed professional contract (Columbus Blue Jackets)
Jimmy Lambert	Forward	Canada	Graduation (signed with Bridgeport Islanders)
Jack Leavy	Goaltender	United States	Graduation
Luke Morgan	Forward	United States	Graduation
Michael Pastujov	Forward	United States	Graduation (signed with Idaho Steelheads)
Owen Power	Defenseman	Canada	Signed professional contract (Buffalo Sabres)
Jack Summers	Defenseman	United States	Graduation
Garrett Van Wyhe	Forward	United States	Graduation (signed with Utica Comets)

== Recruiting ==
Player	Position	Nationality	Age	Notes
Gavin Brindley	Forward	United States	17	Estero, FL
Seamus Casey	Defenseman	United States	18	Fort Myers, FL; selected 46th overall in 2022
Kienan Draper	Forward	United States	20	Bloomfield Hills, MI; selected 187th overall in 2020
Johnny Druskinis	Defenseman	United States	20	Plymouth, MI
Adam Fantilli	Forward	Canada	17	Nobleton, ON
Luca Fantilli	Defenseman	Canada	19	Nobleton, ON
Jackson Hallum	Forward	United States	19	Eagan, MN; selected 91st overall in 2020
T. J. Hughes	Forward	Canada	20	Hamilton, ON
Rutger McGroarty	Forward	United States	18	Lincoln, NE; selected 14th overall in 2022
Brendan Miles	Defenseman	United States	20	Farmington Hills, MI
Frank Nazar	Forward	United States	18	Mount Clemens, MI; selected 13th overall in 2022
Tyler Shea	Goaltender	United States	21	Stevenson Ranch, CA

== Roster ==
As of August 22, 2022.

No.	Nat.	Player	Class	Pos	Height	Weight	DoB	Hometown	Previous team	NHL rights
1		Erik Portillo	Junior	G	6' 6" (1.98 m)	225 lb (102 kg)	2000-09-03	Gothenburg, Sweden	Dubuque (USHL)	BUF, 67th overall 2019
2		Rutger McGroarty	Freshman	F	6' 1" (1.85 m)	185 lb (84 kg)	2004-03-30	Lincoln, Nebraska	USNTDP (USHL)	WPG, 14th overall 2022
4		Gavin Brindley	Freshman	F	5' 9" (1.75 m)	175 lb (79 kg)	2004-10-05	Estero, Florida	Tri-City (USHL)	—
11		Mackie Samoskevich	Sophomore	F	5' 11" (1.8 m)	190 lb (86 kg)	2002-11-15	Sandy Hook, Connecticut	Chicago (USHL)	FLA, 24th overall 2021
12		Brendan Miles	Freshman	D	6' 1" (1.85 m)	185 lb (84 kg)	2001-12-12	Farmington Hills, Michigan	Fairbanks (NAHL)	—
13		T. J. Hughes	Freshman	F	5' 11" (1.8 m)	185 lb (84 kg)	2001-11-09	Hamilton, Ontario	Brooks (AJHL)	—
15		Jacob Truscott (A)	Junior	D	6' 1" (1.85 m)	178 lb (81 kg)	2002-04-12	Port Huron, Michigan	USNTDP (USHL)	VAN, 144th overall 2020
19		Adam Fantilli	Freshman	F	6' 2" (1.88 m)	188 lb (85 kg)	2004-10-12	Nobleton, Ontario	Chicago (USHL)	—
20		Keaton Pehrson (A)	Senior	D	6' 2" (1.88 m)	194 lb (88 kg)	1998-12-10	Lakeville, Minnesota	Tri-City (USHL)	—
21		Jackson Hallum	Freshman	F	6' 0" (1.83 m)	183 lb (83 kg)	2002-09-08	Eagan, Minnesota	Dubuque (USHL)	VGK, 91st overall 2020
22		Philippe Lapointe	Junior	F	5' 11" (1.8 m)	185 lb (84 kg)	2000-02-29	Novi, Michigan	Trail (BCHL)	—
24		Steve Holtz	Junior	D	6' 4" (1.93 m)	190 lb (86 kg)	1999-04-02	White Lake, Michigan	Penticton (BCHL)	—
25		Dylan Duke	Sophomore	F	5' 10" (1.78 m)	181 lb (82 kg)	2003-03-04	Strongsville, Ohio	USNTDP (USHL)	TBL, 126th overall 2021
26		Seamus Casey	Freshman	D	5' 10" (1.78 m)	178 lb (81 kg)	2004-01-08	Fort Myers, Florida	USNTDP (USHL)	NJD, 46th overall 2022
27		Nolan Moyle (C)	Graduate	F	6' 2" (1.88 m)	185 lb (84 kg)	1999-09-13	Briarcliff Manor, New York	Green Bay (USHL)	—
31		Noah West	Junior	G	6' 2" (1.88 m)	185 lb (84 kg)	2000-11-25	Pittsboro, Indiana	Robert Morris (AHA)	—
32		Tyler Shea	Freshman	G	6' 0" (1.83 m)	165 lb (75 kg)	2001-08-03	Stevenson Ranch, California	Wenatchee (BCHL)	—
33		Kienan Draper	Freshman	F	6' 0" (1.83 m)	183 lb (83 kg)	2002-02-19	Bloomfield Hills, Michigan	Chilliwack (BCHL)	DET, 187th overall 2020
43		Luke Hughes (A)	Sophomore	D	6' 2" (1.88 m)	186 lb (84 kg)	2003-09-09	Canton, Michigan	USNTDP (USHL)	NJD, 4th overall 2021
53		Johnny Druskinis	Freshman	D	6' 1" (1.85 m)	185 lb (84 kg)	2002-04-10	Plymouth, Michigan	Tri-City (USHL)	—
63		Luca Fantilli	Freshman	D	6' 0" (1.83 m)	183 lb (83 kg)	2002-12-30	Nobleton, Ontario	Chicago (USHL)	—
71		Nick Granowicz	Senior	F	6' 1" (1.85 m)	174 lb (79 kg)	1998-03-28	Macomb, Michigan	Merritt (BCHL)	—
73		Ethan Edwards	Sophomore	D	5' 11" (1.8 m)	185 lb (84 kg)	2002-06-06	St. Albert, Alberta	Sioux City (USHL)	NJD, 120th overall 2020
90		Jay Keranen	Senior	D	5' 11" (1.8 m)	183 lb (83 kg)	1998-05-08	Brighton, Michigan	Prince George (BCHL)	—
93		Eric Ciccolini	Senior	F	6' 0" (1.83 m)	170 lb (77 kg)	2001-01-04	Vaughan, Ontario	Toronto Jr. Canadiens (OJHL)	NYR, 205th overall 2019
91		Frank Nazar III	Freshman	F	5' 9" (1.75 m)	175 lb (79 kg)	2004-01-14	Mount Clemens, Michigan	USNTDP (USHL)	CHI, 13th overall 2022
94		Mark Estapa	Sophomore	F	6' 2" (1.88 m)	197 lb (89 kg)	2002-01-13	St. Clair, Michigan	Tri-City (USHL)	—

== Coaching staff ==
Name	Position coached	Seasons at Michigan
Brandon Naurato	Interim Head Coach	2nd
Bill Muckalt	Associate head coach	6th
Rob Rassey	Assistant Coach	1st
Bryan Hogan	Volunteer assistant coach	2nd
Topher Scott	Director of Hockey Operations	1st
Joe Maher	Head strength and conditioning coach	5th

== Standings ==
2022–23 Big Ten ice hockey Standings
	Conference record										Overall record					
	GP	W	L	T	OTW	OTL	3/SW	PTS	GF	GA	GP	W	L	T	GF	GA
#2 Minnesota †	24	19	4	1	2	1	0	57	106	50	40	29	10	1	168	90
#3 Michigan *	24	12	10	2	3	3	0	38	82	79	41	26	12	3	171	128
#7 Ohio State	24	11	11	2	0	0	1	36	69	63	40	21	16	3	131	101
Notre Dame	24	10	10	4	2	0	3	35	52	60	37	16	16	5	85	97
#19 Michigan State	24	10	12	2	1	1	2	34	65	80	38	18	18	2	107	115
#8 Penn State	24	10	13	1	0	3	0	34	71	75	39	22	16	1	129	106
Wisconsin	24	6	18	0	0	0	0	18	54	92	36	13	23	0	94	126
Championship: March 18, 2023 † indicates conference regular season champion * indicates conference tournament champion Rankings: USCHO.com Top 20 Poll

== Schedule and results ==
Date	Time	Opponent^{#}	Rank^{#}	Site	TV	Decision	Result	Attendance	Record
Exhibition
October 1	7:00 PM	Windsor*	#6	Yost Ice Arena • Ann Arbor, MI (Exhibition)	BTN+	Portillo	W 8–2	5,800	—
Regular season
October 7	7:00 PM	Lindenwood*	#7	Yost Ice Arena • Ann Arbor, MI	BTN+	Portillo	W 7–4	5,062	1–0–0
October 8	7:00 PM	Lindenwood*	#7	Yost Ice Arena • Ann Arbor, MI	BTN+	Portillo	W 3–1	5,371	2–0–0
October 14	7:00 PM	#9 Boston University*	#6	Yost Ice Arena • Ann Arbor, MI	BTN+	Portillo	W 9–2	5,800	3–0–0
October 16	5:00 PM	#9 Boston University*	#6	Yost Ice Arena • Ann Arbor, MI	BTN+	Portillo	L 2–3	5,800	3–1–0
October 21	7:00 PM	at Lake Superior State*	#5	Taffy Abel Arena • Sault Ste. Marie, MI	FloHockey	Portillo	W 5–2	3,151	4–1–0
October 22	6:00 PM	at Lake Superior State*	#5	Taffy Abel Arena • Sault Ste. Marie, MI	FloHockey	Portillo	W 5–1	3,422	5–1–0
October 28	7:00 PM	#17 Western Michigan*	#4	Yost Ice Arena • Ann Arbor, MI	BTN+	Portillo	W 5–4	5,800	6–1–0
October 29	6:00 PM	at #17 Western Michigan*	#4	Lawson Arena • Kalamazoo, MI	NCHC.tv	Portillo	W 6–5 ^{OT}	4,090	7–1–0
November 4	8:00 PM	at #13 Penn State	#1	Pegula Ice Arena • University Park, PA	BTN	West	L 0–3	6,445	7–2–0 (0–1–0)
November 5	7:30 PM	at #13 Penn State	#1	Pegula Ice Arena • University Park, PA	BTN+	West	W 4–3 ^{OT}	6,361	8–2–0 (1–1–0)
November 11	7:30 PM	at #18 Notre Dame	#3	Compton Family Ice Arena • Notre Dame, IN (Rivalry)	Peacock	Portillo	W 5–1	5,103	9–2–0 (2–1–0)
November 12	6:00 PM	at #18 Notre Dame	#3	Compton Family Ice Arena • Notre Dame, IN (Rivalry)	Peacock	Portillo	L 2–3 ^{OT}	5,099	9–3–0 (2–2–0)
November 17	6:30 PM	#2 Minnesota	#3	Yost Ice Arena • Ann Arbor, MI (Rivalry)	BTN	Portillo	L 2–5	5,800	9–4–0 (2–3–0)
November 18	6:00 PM	#2 Minnesota	#3	Yost Ice Arena • Ann Arbor, MI (Rivalry)	BTN	Portillo	L 3–6	5,800	9–5–0 (2–4–0)
November 25	7:00 PM	#9 Harvard*	#5	Yost Ice Arena • Ann Arbor, MI	BTN+	West	T 4–4 ^{OT}	5,800	9–5–1
November 26	7:00 PM	#9 Harvard*	#5	Yost Ice Arena • Ann Arbor, MI	BTN+	Portillo	W 4–1	5,800	10–5–1
December 2	8:00 PM	at Wisconsin	#5	Kohl Center • Madison, WI	BSD	Portillo	L 3–6	7,464	10–6–1 (2–5–0)
December 3	5:00 PM	at Wisconsin	#5	Kohl Center • Madison, WI	BSD Extra	Portillo	W 4–2	8,619	11–6–1 (3–5–0)
December 9	6:30 PM	at #12 Michigan State	#6	Munn Ice Arena • East Lansing, MI (Rivalry)	BTN	Portillo	L 1–2	6,555	11–7–1 (3–6–0)
December 10	6:30 PM	#12 Michigan State	#6	Yost Ice Arena • Ann Arbor, MI (Rivalry)	BTN	Portillo	W 2–1	5,800	12–7–1 (4–6–0)
January 6	7:00 PM	USNTDP*	#7	Yost Ice Arena • Ann Arbor, MI (Exhibition)	BTN+	Portillo	W 7–6	5,800	—
January 13	6:30 PM	#8 Ohio State	#6	Yost Ice Arena • Ann Arbor, MI (Rivalry)	BTN+	Portillo	L 2–7	5,800	12–8–1 (4–7–0)
January 14	4:30 PM	#8 Ohio State	#6	Yost Ice Arena • Ann Arbor, MI (Rivalry)	BTN	Portillo	W 4–2	5,800	13–8–1 (5–7–0)
January 20	8:00 PM	at #2 Minnesota	#8	3M Arena at Mariucci • Minneapolis, MN	BSD	Portillo	L 3–4 ^{OT}	10,300	13–9–1 (5–8–0)
January 21	8:00 PM	at #2 Minnesota	#8	3M Arena at Mariucci • Minneapolis, MN	BTN	Portillo	W 5–4 ^{OT}	10,455	14–9–1 (6–8–0)
January 27	7:00 PM	#6 Penn State	#7	Yost Ice Arena • Ann Arbor, MI	BTN+	Portillo	W 7–3	5,800	15–9–1 (7–8–0)
January 28	7:00 PM	#6 Penn State	#7	Yost Ice Arena • Ann Arbor, MI	BTN	Portillo	W 5–4	5,800	16–9–1 (8–8–0)
February 3	7:00 PM	Wisconsin	#6	Yost Ice Arena • Ann Arbor, MI	BTN+	Portillo	W 6–2	5,800	17–9–1 (9–8–0)
February 4	7:00 PM	Wisconsin	#6	Yost Ice Arena • Ann Arbor, MI	BTN+	Portillo	W 7–4	5,800	18–9–1 (10–8–0)
February 10	7:00 PM	at #15 Michigan State	#5	Munn Ice Arena • East Lansing, MI (Rivalry)	BSD Extra	Portillo	W 4–2	6,555	19–9–1 (11–8–0)
February 11	8:00 PM	vs. #15 Michigan State	#5	Little Caesars Arena • Detroit, MI (Duel in the D)	ESPNU	Portillo	W 4–3 ^{OT}	18,325	20–9–1 (12–8–0)
February 16	7:00 PM	at #10 Ohio State	#4	Value City Arena • Columbus, OH (Rivalry)	BTN+	Portillo	T 3–3 ^{SOL}	8,593	20–9–2 (12–8–1)
February 18	4:00 PM	vs. #10 Ohio State	#4	FirstEnergy Stadium • Cleveland, OH (Faceoff on the Lake)	BTN	Portillo	L 2–4	45,523	20–10–2 (12–9–1)
February 24	7:00 PM	#20 Notre Dame	#4	Yost Ice Arena • Ann Arbor, MI (Rivalry)	BTN+	Portillo	T 3–3 ^{SOL}	5,800	20–10–3 (12–9–2)
February 25	8:00 PM	#20 Notre Dame	#4	Yost Ice Arena • Ann Arbor, MI (Rivalry)	BTN	Portillo	L 1–2 ^{OT}	5,800	20–11–3 (12–10–2)
Big Ten Tournament
March 3	7:00 PM	Wisconsin	#4	Yost Ice Arena • Ann Arbor, MI (Quarterfinals)	BTN+	Portillo	W 6–5 ^{OT}	3,704	21–11–3
March 4	6:00 PM	Wisconsin	#4	Yost Ice Arena • Ann Arbor, MI (Quarterfinals)	BTN+	Portillo	W 7–4	5,541	22–11–3
March 11	6:30 PM	#9 Ohio State	#4	Yost Ice Arena • Ann Arbor, MI (Semifinals)	BTN	Portillo	W 7–3	5,800	23–11–3
March 18	8:00 PM	at #1 Minnesota	#4	3M Arena at Mariucci • Minneapolis, MN (Championship)	BTN	Portillo	W 4–3	10,305	24–11–3
NCAA Tournament
March 24	8:30 PM	vs. #19 Colgate	#2	PPL Center • Allentown, PA (Regional semifinals)	ESPN2	Portillo	W 11–1	7,067	25–11–3
March 26	6:30 PM	vs. #11 Penn State	#2	PPL Center • Allentown, PA (Regional final)	ESPN2	Portillo	W 2–1 ^{OT}	8,375	26–11–3
April 6	8:30 PM	vs. #3 Quinnipiac	#2	Amalie Arena • Tampa, FL (National semifinals)	ESPN2	Portillo	L 2–5	19,119	26–12–3
*Non-conference game. ^{#}Rankings from USCHO.com Poll. All times are in Eastern Time. Source:

== Rankings ==
Poll	Week																											
Poll	Pre	1	2	3	4	5	6	7	8	9	10	11	12	13	14	15	16	17	18	19	20	21	22	23	24	25	26	27 (Final)
USCHO.com	6 (2)	6 (2)^	7 (1)	6 (1)	5 (1)	4 (6)	1 (22)	3 (3)	3	5	5 (2)	6	7	7^	7	6	8	7	6	5	4	4	4	4	4	2 (9)	2^	3
USA Today	6 (2)	6	6	6	5	4 (3)	1 (15)	3 (3)	3	5	6	7	8	8	7	6	7	7	6	5	4	4	4	4	4	2 (4)	2 (4)	3

Note: USCHO did not release a poll in weeks 1, 13, or 26.

== Awards and honors ==
Weekly Awards
Player	Award	Date Awarded	Ref.
Erik Portillo	Big Ten Third Star of the Week	October 18, 2022	
Adam Fantilli	Big Ten First Star of the Week	October 25, 2022	
Luke Hughes	Big Ten First Star of the Week	November 1, 2022	
Mackie Samoskevich	Big Ten Second Star of the Week	November 15, 2022	
Dylan Duke	Big Ten Third Star of the Week	November 22, 2022	
Erik Portillo	Big Ten Second Star of the Week	November 29, 2022	
Erik Portillo	Big Ten Second Star of the Week	December 12, 2022	
Luke Hughes	Big Ten First Star of the Week	January 30, 2023	
Adam Fantilli	Big Ten Third Star of the Week	January 30, 2023	
Gavin Brindley	Big Ten Second Star of the Week	February 7, 2023	
Luke Hughes	Big Ten First Star of the Week	February 14, 2023	

Player	Award	Ref
Adam Fantilli	Hobey Baker Award	
Adam Fantilli	Tim Taylor Award	
Adam Fantilli	AHCA West First Team All-American	
Luke Hughes	AHCA West First Team All-American	
Adam Fantilli	Big Ten Freshman of the Year	
Adam Fantilli	All-Big Ten First Team	
Luke Hughes	All-Big Ten First Team	
Mackie Samoskevich	All-Big Ten Second Team	
Seamus Casey	All-Big Ten Freshman Team	
Adam Fantilli	All-Big Ten Freshman Team	
Adam Fantilli	Big Ten Tournament Most Outstanding Player	
Seamus Casey	Big Ten All-Tournament Team	
Luke Hughes	Big Ten All-Tournament Team	
Adam Fantilli	Big Ten All-Tournament Team	
Rutger McGroarty	Big Ten All-Tournament Team	

== Players drafted into the NHL ==
Michigan had three players drafted in the 2022 NHL entry draft. Frank Nazar and Rutger McGroarty were selected back-to-back in the first round of the NHL Draft. Michigan had two players drafted in the 2023 NHL entry draft. Adam Fantilli was drafted in the first round, third overall, while Gavin Brindley was drafted 34th overall. Fantilli became the 33rd Wolverine to be selected in the first round of the NHL Draft, which leads all NCAA teams.

Year	Round	Pick	Player	NHL team
2023	1	3	Adam Fantilli	Columbus Blue Jackets
2022	1	13	Frank Nazar	Chicago Blackhawks
2022	1	14	Rutger McGroarty	Winnipeg Jets
2023	2	34	Gavin Brindley	Columbus Blue Jackets
2022	2	46	Seamus Casey	New Jersey Devils
