= List of NCAA coaches =

List of NCAA coaches may refer to:

- List of current NCAA Division I baseball coaches
- List of current NCAA Division I men's basketball coaches
- List of current NCAA Division I women's basketball coaches
- List of current NCAA Division I FBS football coaches
- List of current NCAA Division I men's ice hockey coaches
