= 2024–25 Minnesota Golden Gophers men's ice hockey season =

Co-Big Ten, Champion NCAA Tournament, Regional Semifinals
- Conference: T–1st Big Ten
- Home ice: 3M Arena at Mariucci

Rankings
- USCHO: #9
- USA Hockey: #8

Record
- Overall: 25–11–4
- Conference: 15–6–3
- Home: 15–4–2
- Road: 8–5–2
- Neutral: 2–2–0

Coaches and captains
- Head coach: Bob Motzko
- Assistant coaches: Steve Miller; Ben Gordon; Brennan Poderzay
- Captain(s): Ryan Chesley; Aaron Huglen; Mike Koster; Mason Nevers; Jimmy Snuggerud; Cal Thomas

The 2024–25 Minnesota Golden Gophers men's ice hockey season was the 104th season of play for the program and 35th in the Big Ten. The Golden Gophers represented the University of Minnesota in the 2024–25 NCAA Division I men's ice hockey season, played their home games at 3M Arena at Mariucci and were coached by Bob Motzko in his seventh season.

== Season ==
Minnesota entered the season as one of the favorites to compete for the national championship. The Gophers lost few players from a battle-tested group that made the national quarterfinals the year before and they were augmenting the core with slew of talented prospects. Five of Minnesota's incoming players were selected in the NHL draft with Matthew Wood having already proven himself at the collegiate level at Connecticut. While Wood would help make up for the loss of the previous season's leading scorers (Bryce Brodzinski and Rhett Pitlick), the bigger question was in goal. Justen Close, who had been the starter ever since the departure of Jack LaFontaine in 2022, had graduated and the Gophers would now need to find his replacement. Nathan Airey was already on the team, having filling in with sport work as the backup, but Minnesota didn't yet know if he was capable of serving as the full-time starter. Liam Soulière was then brought in as a graduate transfer from Penn State. While he was a much more experienced netminder with more than 80 starts in his career, his record as of late had been a bit spotty.

The team was set to begin the season in the Ice Breaker Tournament and the Gophers began by rotating their two goaltenders. While they were able to succeed in the season-opener, the offense had a bit of a hiccup in the tournament final when they were stymied by Omaha despite outshooting the Mavericks 54–18. While the team was unhappy with the loss, their early performance continued for several weeks with the Gophers' offense dominating the competition. Even when their goaltenders had an off night, Minnesota was usually able to outscore the opposition. Minnesota was so dominant in the first half of the season that they hardly suffered a loss and managed to earn the #1 ranking by mid-December. The attack was being led by Jimmy Snuggerud, who was able to score in virtually every single game. He was not alone, however and six of his teammates joined in on the party by recording double-digit goal totals for the year. The Gophers averaged nearly 4 goals a game for the year and finished as the third best scoring team in the nation.

Just before the winter break, the team was able to test out its top ranking by facing off against #3 Michigan State at home. Both teams held serve in the first game, which ended in a shootout loss for the Gophers. The second looked like Minnesota was setting up for a triumphant win when Brody Lamb's power play goal gave Minnesota a 2-goal lead early in the third. However, the Spartans took over the game in the latter part of the period and scored 3 goals in under 4 minutes to completely stun the partisan crowd. Minnesota tried to regain its footing but time was already short and they were unable to get their offense back in gear. After pulling Soulière for an extra attacker, MSU nabbed an empty-net goal, sending Minnesota into their vacation with missed opportunity.

The loss seemed to strike a nerve with the team and Minnesota was not the same juggernaut that they were during the first half of the season. After returning from the break, the Gophers were not getting the same consistency out of their goaltenders and the team started slipping from their perch. When the team had their rematch with Michigan State, Airey posted a woeful performance and surrendered 5 goals before being pulled in the second period. Soulière gave up a further 4 in the third to give Minnesota its worst outing of the season but the graduate was back in goal for the start of the rematch. Soulière recovered well for his start, holding the Spartans back long enough for the team to earn another shootout loss. That weekend was the deciding factor in Minnesota handing the starting job to Soulière for the rest of the season. That choice appeared to stabilize the position in goal and Minnesota was able to reassert itself as one of the top teams in the country. The Gophers ended the regular season tied with Michigan State atop the conference standings, however, due to MSU dominating the season series the Gophers missed out a bye into the semifinal round.

=== Postseason ===
By the start of the Big Ten tournament, Minnesota was already guaranteed a spot in the NCAA tournament. Possessing the #4 position in the PairWise, it was mathematically impossible for Minnesota to fall out of the top 10. Perhaps taking this to heart, Minnesota was less than impressive when they opened their playoff run by allowing Notre Dame to build a 2-goal lead in the first period. While Wood cut the leas in half just before intermission, the Irish regain their edge with a third goal just 78 seconds into the second period. Soulière was pulled in favor of Airey and the sophomore did everything he could to keep Minnesota in the game. The Gophers didn't surrender another goal but they found it difficult to weave their way through a staunch Notre Dame defense who was doing yeoman's work in stifling Minnesota. Sam Rinzel finally managed to break through midway through the third but that was a close as the Gophers could get and they fell in the first match.

After that rather stunning defeat, the team regrouped in the rematch and came out firing. With Airey in goal, the offense assaulted the Irish goal, trying to overpower the visitors. Notre Dame was able to weather the storm for the first half of the match but eventually the dame broke and Minnesota began pouring goals into the cage. Four of the team's top scorers found the back of the goal and allowed Minnesota to even the series. The team entered the rubber match with the same idea in mind. While they were able to outshoot Notre Dame to the tune of 39–21, the scoring never materialized. The Fighting Irish were able to get a pair past Airey in the first two periods and then put up a defensive wall much in the same way they had in the first game. Wood halved the lead on the power play but that was the only offense Minnesota could muster. Two goals in the final 10 minutes gave the Irish enough of a cushion to win the match comfortably and banish the Gophers with a massive upset.

While the loss to Notre Dame didn't hurt Minnesota's tournament hopes, it did drop the team down to No. 5 and prevent them from earning a #1 seed. The slight decrease didn't affect the Gopher's placement as the team was put in the Fargo regional, giving their fans a short drive, but it did alter the Gophers' first round matchup. Instead of facing off against #14 Minnesota State, they were set against #11 Massachusetts. The game saw Soulière return to the Minnesota crease as the starter but the game was disrupted before it even began. The match was delayed more than an hour and half due to the earlier match going into double overtime and both sides appeared unprepared for the start. However, Snuggerud took advantage of a UMass penalty to open the scoring. While the Minutemen were able to tie the game quickly Lamb restored Minnesota's lead before the end of the first. Minnesota continued their solid play into the third with Connor Kurth scoring the only goal of the period to give the Gophers a 2-goal lead. Massachusetts then turned up the pressure in the third and managed to score two goals in quick succession to tie the game. The Gophers recovered afterwards and began returning fire, turning the game into a see-saw battle. With less than 5 minutes to play, disaster struck when Jimmy Clark accidentally deflected the puck into his own net to give UMass their first lead of the game. Facing the end of its season, Minnesota's leading scorer came to the rescue and Snuggerud knotted the match at 4-all off of an offensive zone faceoff. Minnesota had several chances to score the winning goal in both regulation and overtime but their chances went for naught. Minnesota's season was ended after an apparent missed penalty resulted in a turnover at center ice that ended with a goal off of the rush. Neither the team nor the fans were happy with what they believed was a mistake by the referees but there was nothing the Gophers could do about their fate.

== Departures ==
| Player | Position | Nationality | Cause |
|---|---|---|---|
| Bryce Brodzinski | Forward | United States | Graduation (signed with Ontario Reign) |
| Justen Close | Goaltender | Canada | Graduation (signed with Jacksonville Icemen) |
| Carl Fish | Defenseman | United States | Graduate transfer to Providence |
| Jaxon Nelson | Forward | United States | Graduation (signed with Boston Bruins) |
| Garrett Pinoniemi | Forward | United States | Transferred to Omaha |
| Rhett Pitlick | Forward | United States | Transferred to Minnesota State |
| Charlie Strobel | Forward | United States | Transferred to Colorado College |

== Recruiting ==
Erik Påhlsson (photographed) was successfully recruited

| Player | Position | Nationality | Age | Notes |
|---|---|---|---|---|
| August Falloon | Forward | United States | 20 | St. Cloud, MN |
| Leo Gruba | Defenseman | United States | 20 | Lake Elmo, MN |
| Beckett Hendrickson | Forward | United States | 19 | Minnetonka, MN; selected 124th overall in 2023 |
| Erik Påhlsson | Forward | Sweden | 20 | Landskrona, SWE; selected 213th overall in 2024 |
| Liam Soulière | Goaltender | Canada | 25 | Brampton, ON; graduate transfer from Penn State |
| John Whipple | Defenseman | United States | 18 | Morristown, NJ; selected 144th overall in 2024 |
| Matthew Wood | Forward | Canada | 19 | Lethbridge, AB; transfer from Connecticut; selected 15th overall in 2023 |
| Brodie Ziemer | Forward | United States | 18 | Carver, MN; selected 71st overall in 2024 |

== Roster ==
As of September 12, 2024.

| No. | Nat. | Player | Class | Pos | Height | Weight | DoB | Hometown | Previous team | NHL rights |
|---|---|---|---|---|---|---|---|---|---|---|
| 2 | (United States) | Sam Rinzel | Sophomore | D | 6' 4" (1.93 m) | 185 lb (84 kg) | 2004-06-25 | Chanhassen, Minnesota | Waterloo Black Hawks (USHL) | CHI, 25th overall 2022 |
| 3 | (United States) | John Whipple | Freshman | D | 6' 1" (1.85 m) | 194 lb (88 kg) | 2006-01-20 | Morristown, New Jersey | USNTDP (USHL) | DET, 144th overall 2024 |
| 4 | (United States) | Mike Koster (C) | Graduate | D | 5' 10" (1.78 m) | 180 lb (82 kg) | 2001-04-13 | Chaska, Minnesota | Tri-City Storm (USHL) | TOR, 146th overall 2019 |
| 7 | (United States) | Aaron Huglen (C) | Senior | F | 6' 0" (1.83 m) | 170 lb (77 kg) | 2001-03-06 | Roseau, Minnesota | Fargo Force (USHL) | BUF, 102nd overall 2019 |
| 9 | (United States) | August Falloon | Freshman | F | 6' 2" (1.88 m) | 201 lb (91 kg) | 2004-02-23 | St. Cloud, Minnesota | Tri-City Storm (USHL) | — |
| 10 | (United States) | Connor Kurth | Junior | F | 6' 0" (1.83 m) | 210 lb (95 kg) | 2003-07-30 | Lindstrom, Minnesota | Dubuque Fighting Saints (USHL) | TBL, 190th overall 2022 |
| 11 | (United States) | Oliver Moore | Sophomore | F | 5' 11" (1.8 m) | 190 lb (86 kg) | 2005-01-22 | Mounds View, Minnesota | USNTDP (USHL) | CHI, 19th overall 2023 |
| 14 | (United States) | Beckett Hendrickson | Freshman | F | 6' 2" (1.88 m) | 174 lb (79 kg) | 2005-06-24 | Minnetonka, Minnesota | Dubuque Fighting Saints (USHL) | BOS, 124th overall 2023 |
| 15 | (United States) | Max Rud | Sophomore | D | 6' 3" (1.91 m) | 185 lb (84 kg) | 2003-09-17 | St. Cloud, Minnesota | Sioux Falls Stampede (USHL) | — |
| 17 | (United States) | Brody Lamb | Junior | F | 6' 1" (1.85 m) | 175 lb (79 kg) | 2003-08-30 | Byron, Minnesota | Green Bay Gamblers (USHL) | NYR, 104th overall 2021 |
| 18 | (United States) | Mason Nevers (C) | Graduate | F | 5' 11" (1.8 m) | 175 lb (79 kg) | 2001-04-03 | Edina, Minnesota | Des Moines Buccaneers (USHL) | — |
| 19 | (United States) | John Mittelstadt | Junior | F | 5' 9" (1.75 m) | 175 lb (79 kg) | 2001-10-27 | Eden Prairie, Minnesota | Green Bay Gamblers (USHL) | — |
| 20 | (United States) | Luke Mittelstadt | Junior | D | 5' 11" (1.8 m) | 175 lb (79 kg) | 2003-01-22 | Eden Prairie, Minnesota | Madison Capitols (USHL) | MTL, 197th overall 2023 |
| 22 | (United States) | Cal Thomas (C) | Junior | D | 6' 0" (1.83 m) | 185 lb (84 kg) | 2003-05-08 | Maple Grove, Minnesota | Chicago Steel (USHL) | ARI, 171st overall 2021 |
| 23 | (United States) | Jimmy Clark | Sophomore | F | 6' 0" (1.83 m) | 180 lb (82 kg) | 2004-09-24 | Edina, Minnesota | Green Bay Gamblers (USHL) | MIN, 213th overall 2023 |
| 27 | (United States) | Nick Michel | Graduate | F | 5' 11" (1.8 m) | 180 lb (82 kg) | 1999-03-16 | Waconia, Minnesota | Saint John's (MIAC) | — |
| 29 | (Canada) | Nathan Airey | Sophomore | G | 6' 3" (1.91 m) | 190 lb (86 kg) | 2003-04-24 | Cochrane, Alberta | Cranbrook Bucks (BCHL) | — |
| 30 | (United States) | Zach Wiese | Junior | G | 5' 10" (1.78 m) | 210 lb (95 kg) | 2002-01-02 | Owatonna, Minnesota | Rochester Grizzlies (NA3HL) | — |
| 31 | (Canada) | Liam Soulière | Graduate | G | 5' 11" (1.8 m) | 180 lb (82 kg) | 1999-03-16 | Brampton, Ontario | Penn State (Big Ten) | — |
| 33 | (United States) | Axel Begley | Sophomore | D | 6' 2" (1.88 m) | 200 lb (91 kg) | 2003-12-16 | Mahtomedi, Minnesota | Wisconsin Windigo (NAHL) | — |
| 35 | (United States) | Matt Bryant | Junior | G | 6' 2" (1.88 m) | 170 lb (77 kg) | 2003-04-15 | La Crosse, Wisconsin | Minnesota (ACHA) | — |
| 55 | (United States) | Leo Gruba | Freshman | D | 6' 2" (1.88 m) | 209 lb (95 kg) | 2003-12-14 | Lake Elmo, Minnesota | Fargo Force (USHL) | — |
| 71 | (United States) | Ryan Chesley (C) | Junior | D | 6' 0" (1.83 m) | 200 lb (91 kg) | 2004-02-27 | Mahtomedi, Minnesota | USNTDP (USHL) | WSH, 37th overall 2022 |
| 72 | (Sweden) | Erik Påhlsson | Freshman | F | 6' 1" (1.85 m) | 185 lb (84 kg) | 2004-04-09 | Landskrona, Sweden | Dubuque Fighting Saints (USHL) | NSH, 213th overall 2024 |
| 74 | (United States) | Brodie Ziemer | Freshman | F | 5' 11" (1.8 m) | 196 lb (89 kg) | 2006-02-22 | Carver, Minnesota | USNTDP (USHL) | BUF, 71st overall 2024 |
| 81 | (United States) | Jimmy Snuggerud (C) | Junior | F | 6' 1" (1.85 m) | 185 lb (84 kg) | 2004-06-01 | Chaska, Minnesota | USNTDP (USHL) | STL, 23rd overall 2022 |
| 91 | (Canada) | Matthew Wood | Sophomore | F | 6' 3" (1.91 m) | 190 lb (86 kg) | 2005-02-06 | Nanaimo, British Columbia | Connecticut (HEA) | NSH, 15th overall 2023 |

== Standings ==
2024–25 Big Ten ice hockey Standings
| | Conference record | | | | | | | | | | Overall record | | | | | |
| | GP | W | L | T | OTW | OTL | 3/SW | PTS | GF | GA | GP | W | L | T | GF | GA |
|---|---|---|---|---|---|---|---|---|---|---|---|---|---|---|---|---|
| #6 Michigan State †* | 24 | 15 | 5 | 4 | 2 | 1 | 2 | 50 | 92 | 60 | 37 | 26 | 7 | 4 | 129 | 77 |
| #9 Minnesota † | 24 | 15 | 6 | 3 | 1 | 3 | 0 | 50 | 87 | 62 | 40 | 25 | 11 | 4 | 154 | 101 |
| #11 Ohio State | 24 | 14 | 9 | 1 | 3 | 2 | 0 | 42 | 72 | 62 | 40 | 24 | 14 | 2 | 127 | 106 |
| #17 Michigan | 24 | 12 | 10 | 2 | 5 | 1 | 2 | 36 | 76 | 83 | 36 | 18 | 15 | 3 | 112 | 118 |
| #5 Penn State | 24 | 9 | 11 | 4 | 2 | 1 | 3 | 33 | 78 | 88 | 40 | 22 | 14 | 4 | 139 | 120 |
| Wisconsin | 24 | 7 | 16 | 1 | 1 | 6 | 0 | 27 | 64 | 77 | 37 | 13 | 21 | 3 | 108 | 110 |
| Notre Dame | 24 | 4 | 19 | 1 | 2 | 2 | 1 | 14 | 60 | 97 | 38 | 12 | 25 | 1 | 102 | 127 |
Championship: March 22, 2025 † indicates conference regular season champion * indicates conference tournament champion Rankings: USCHO.com Top 20 Poll

== Schedule and results ==
| Date | Time | Opponent^{#} | Rank^{#} | Site | TV | Decision | Result | Attendance | Record |
Exhibition
| October 5 | 6:00 pm | at #16 St. Cloud State* | #6 | Herb Brooks National Hockey Center • St. Cloud, Minnesota (Exhibition) | Fox 9+ | | W 5–1 | | |
Ice Breaker Tournament
| October 11 | 9:30 pm | vs. Air Force* | #5 | Orleans Arena • Las Vegas, Nevada (Ice Breaker Semifinal) | B1G+ | Airey | W 7–1 | 2,152 | 1–0–0 |
| October 12 | 9:30 pm | vs. #15 Omaha* | #5 | Orleans Arena • Las Vegas, Nevada (Ice Breaker Championship) | B1G+ | Soulière | L 1–2 ^{OT} | 1,922 | 1–1–0 |
Regular season
| October 18 | 7:00 pm | at Minnesota Duluth* | #6 | AMSOIL Arena • Duluth, Minnesota (Rivalry) | Fox 9+ | Airey | W 7–5 | 6,444 | 2–1–0 |
| October 19 | 6:00 pm | at Minnesota Duluth* | #6 | AMSOIL Arena • Duluth, Minnesota (Rivalry) | Fox 9+ | Soulière | W 5–1 | 7,066 | 3–1–0 |
| October 25 | 5:30 pm | St. Thomas* | #5 | 3M Arena at Mariucci • Minneapolis, Minnesota | Fox 9+ | Airey | W 7–1 | 9,722 | 4–1–0 |
| October 26 | 8:00 pm | vs. St. Thomas* | #5 | Xcel Energy Center • Saint Paul, Minnesota | Fox 9+ | Soulière | W 6–2 | 10,104 | 5–1–0 |
| November 1 | 7:00 pm | #18 Penn State | #4 | 3M Arena at Mariucci • Minneapolis, Minnesota | Fox 9+ | Airey | W 3–1 | 8,351 | 6–1–0 (1–0–0) |
| November 2 | 7:00 pm | #18 Penn State | #4 | 3M Arena at Mariucci • Minneapolis, Minnesota | Fox 9+ | Soulière | W 1–0 | 8,872 | 7–1–0 (2–0–0) |
| November 8 | 7:00 pm | at Wisconsin | #3 | Kohl Center • Madison, Wisconsin (Rivalry) | B1G+ | Airey | W 3–2 | 10,157 | 8–1–0 (3–0–0) |
| November 9 | 7:00 pm | at Wisconsin | #3 | Kohl Center • Madison, Wisconsin (Rivalry) | B1G+ | Soulière | W 3–2 ^{OT} | 11,694 | 9–1–0 (4–0–0) |
| November 14 | 7:00 pm | Bemidji State* | #3 | 3M Arena at Mariucci • Minneapolis, Minnesota | Fox 9+ | Airey | W 5–3 | 8,673 | 10–1–0 |
| November 16 | 6:00 pm | at Bemidji State* | #3 | Sanford Center • Bemidji, Minnesota | Fox 9+, Midco Sports+ | Soulière | L 1–3 | 3,691 | 10–2–0 |
| November 22 | 6:00 pm | at Notre Dame | #4 | Compton Family Ice Arena • Notre Dame, Indiana | Peacock | Airey | W 6–3 | 5,249 | 11–2–0 (5–0–0) |
| November 23 | 5:00 pm | at Notre Dame | #4 | Compton Family Ice Arena • Notre Dame, Indiana | Peacock | Airey | W 5–3 | 5,011 | 12–2–0 (6–0–0) |
| November 29 | 7:00 pm | Alaska* | #3 | 3M Arena at Mariucci • Minneapolis, Minnesota | Fox 9+ | Airey | T 1–1 ^{OT} | 9,580 | 12–2–1 |
| November 30 | 5:00 pm | Alaska* | #3 | 3M Arena at Mariucci • Minneapolis, Minnesota | Fox 9+ | Soulière | W 5–2 | 9,933 | 13–2–1 |
| December 6 | 7:00 pm | #6 Michigan | #4 | 3M Arena at Mariucci • Minneapolis, Minnesota (Rivalry) | FS1 | Airey | W 6–0 | 9,198 | 14–2–1 (7–0–0) |
| December 7 | 5:00 pm | #6 Michigan | #4 | 3M Arena at Mariucci • Minneapolis, Minnesota (Rivalry) | Fox 9+ | Soulière | W 2–0 | 9,764 | 15–2–1 (8–0–0) |
| December 13 | 7:30 pm | #3 Michigan State | #1 | 3M Arena at Mariucci • Minneapolis, Minnesota | BTN | Airey | T 3–3 ^{SOL} | 9,713 | 15–2–2 (8–0–1) |
| December 14 | 5:00 pm | #3 Michigan State | #1 | 3M Arena at Mariucci • Minneapolis, Minnesota | Fox 9+ | Soulière | L 3–5 | 9,922 | 15–3–2 (8–1–1) |
| January 3 | 7:00 pm | Mercyhurst* | #3 | 3M Arena at Mariucci • Minneapolis, Minnesota | Fox 9+ | Airey | W 6–2 | 10,019 | 16–3–2 |
| January 4 | 5:00 pm | Mercyhurst* | #3 | 3M Arena at Mariucci • Minneapolis, Minnesota | Fox 9+ | Soulière | W 5–2 | 10,201 | 17–3–2 |
| January 10 | 6:00 pm | at #11 Ohio State | #3 | Value City Arena • Columbus, Ohio | B1G+ | Airey | L 1–5 | 3,315 | 17–4–2 (8–2–1) |
| January 11 | 5:30 pm | at #11 Ohio State | #3 | Value City Arena • Columbus, Ohio | BTN | Soulière | W 6–1 | 5,973 | 18–4–2 (9–2–1) |
| January 17 | 7:00 pm | Notre Dame | #3 | 3M Arena at Mariucci • Minneapolis, Minnesota | Fox 9+ | Airey | W 5–2 | 10,362 | 19–4–2 (10–2–1) |
| January 18 | 5:00 pm | Notre Dame | #3 | 3M Arena at Mariucci • Minneapolis, Minnesota | Fox 9+ | Soulière | L 3–4 ^{OT} | 10,346 | 19–5–2 (10–3–1) |
| January 24 | 6:00 pm | at #2 Michigan State | #4 | Munn Ice Arena • East Lansing, Michigan | B1G+ | Airey | L 3–9 | 6,555 | 19–6–2 (10–4–1) |
| January 25 | 5:00 pm | at #2 Michigan State | #4 | Munn Ice Arena • East Lansing, Michigan | BTN | Soulière | T 3–3 ^{SOL} | 6,555 | 19–6–3 (10–4–2) |
| January 31 | 7:00 pm | #17 Wisconsin | #4 | 3M Arena at Mariucci • Minneapolis, Minnesota (Rivalry) | Fox 9+ | Soulière | W 5–2 | 10,747 | 20–6–3 (11–4–2) |
| February 1 | 5:00 pm | #17 Wisconsin | #4 | 3M Arena at Mariucci • Minneapolis, Minnesota (Rivalry) | Fox 9+ | Soulière | W 4–1 | 10,894 | 21–6–3 (12–4–2) |
| February 14 | 6:00 pm | at #12 Michigan | #4 | Yost Ice Arena • Ann Arbor, Michigan (Rivalry) | B1G+ | Soulière | L 2–3 ^{OT} | 5,800 | 21–7–3 (12–5–2) |
| February 15 | 5:00 pm | at #12 Michigan | #4 | Yost Ice Arena • Ann Arbor, Michigan (Rivalry) | BTN | Soulière | T 2–2 ^{SOL} | 5,800 | 21–7–4 (12–5–3) |
| February 21 | 7:00 pm | #7 Ohio State | #5 | 3M Arena at Mariucci • Minneapolis, Minnesota | Fox 9+ | Soulière | W 4–1 | 10,500 | 22–7–4 (13–5–3) |
| February 22 | 5:00 pm | #7 Ohio State | #5 | 3M Arena at Mariucci • Minneapolis, Minnesota | Fox 9+ | Soulière | W 6–3 | 10,565 | 23–7–4 (14–5–3) |
| February 28 | 7:30 | at #15 Penn State | #2 | Pegula Ice Arena • University Park, Pennsylvania | BTN | Soulière | L 3–4 ^{OT} | 6,577 | 23–8–4 (14–6–3) |
| March 1 | 7:00 pm | at #15 Penn State | #2 | Pegula Ice Arena • University Park, Pennsylvania | BTN | Soulière | W 5–3 | 6,570 | 24–8–4 (15–6–3) |
Big Ten Tournament
| March 7 | 8:00 pm | Notre Dame | #3 | 3M Arena at Mariucci • Minneapolis, Minnesota (Quarterfinals Game 1) | B1G+ | Soulière | L 2–3 | 5,551 | 24–9–4 |
| March 8 | 8:00 pm | Notre Dame | #3 | 3M Arena at Mariucci • Minneapolis, Minnesota (Quarterfinals Game 2) | B1G+ | Airey | W 4–2 | 6,331 | 25–9–4 |
| March 9 | 7:00 pm | Notre Dame | #3 | 3M Arena at Mariucci • Minneapolis, Minnesota (Quarterfinals Game 3) | B1G+ | Airey | L 1–4 | 4,642 | 25–10–4 |
NCAA Tournament
| March 27 | 7:30 pm | vs. #13 Massachusetts* | #5 | Scheels Arena • Fargo, North Dakota (Regional Semifinal) | ESPN2 | Soulière | L 4–5 ^{OT} | | 25–11–4 |
*Non-conference game. ^{#}Rankings from USCHO.com Poll. All times are in Central Time. Source:

== NCAA tournament ==
| March 27, 2025; 8:45 pm | (2) Minnesota | 4–5 (OT) (2–1, 1–0, 1–3, 0–1) | (3) Massachusetts | Scheels Arena; Attendance: 4,816 |

Game reference

Liam Soulière (out 48:44, in 52:07)
Nathan Airey (in 48:44, out 52:07)
Goalies
Michael Hrabal
Referees:
Joe Carusone
Jason Williams
Linesmen:
Ryan Knapp
Adam Wood

| (Rinzel, Koster) Jimmy Snuggerud (23) – PP – 14:14 | 1–0 |
| | 1–1 | 14:34 – Larry Keenan (4) (Lautenbach, Dell'Elce) |
| (unassisted) Brody Lamb (17) – 18:49 | 2–1 |
| (Clark, Wood) Connor Kurth (18) – 34:07 | 3–1 |
| | 3–2 | 47:14 – Aydar Suniev (19) (Jenčko, Ölvestad) |
| | 3–3 | 48:49 – Daniel Jenčko (6) (Murray, Ločmelis) |
| | 3–4 | 55:07 – Francesco Dell'elce (7) (Connors, Jo. Musa) |
| (Moore) Jimmy Snuggerud (24) – 56:24 | 4–4 |
| | 4–5 | 64:49 – GW – Aydar Suniev (20) (Ločmelis) |

4 min
Penalties
4 min
29
Shots
37

Game summary
With the game beginning more than an hour later than expected due to the earlier match going into double overtime, the start was a bit disjointed as the two teams had to shake off the cobwebs. While Minnesota was also having to contend with the absence of a few players due to illness, it was the Gophers who took controlled the game early. The first good chance of the night came when Jimmy Snuggerud broke in on the UMass goal but Michael Hrabal was able to make the save. The Minutemen answered with one of the own a minute later when Cole O'Hara tried to slip around behind Liam Soulière but the puck rolled off of his stick before he could shoot into an open net. The offenses bogged down in the middle of the period but Minnesota was still able to keep the puck in the Massachusetts end for long stretches. With few scoring chances being generated, the players occupied themselves with some pushing and shoving. As the speed of the game increased UMass got a few good chances on goal but Bo Cosman got a little too aggressive on the forecheck and was called for interference. On the ensuing power play, Snuggerud was able to corral the puck near the front of the net and Lucas Mercuri was forced to take a hooking minor to stop a golden scoring chance. Right off of the next faceoff, Matthew Wood was called for a trip to end revert the 2-man advantage back to just 1. With a ton of open ice, Minnesota was able to set up in the Massachusetts end and Snuggerud blasted a 50-foot shot past Hrabal for the opening goal. Just seconds later, Larry Keenan fired a puck in on Soulière who misread the trajectory and ended up deflecting it up into the top corner. The game see-sawed after the two quick goals but both defenses were able to force long-distance shots. Near the end of the period, Minnesota was able to spend some time in the Minutemen end and force an offensive zone faceoff. After Kenny Connors fumbled the draw, Brody Lamb snagged the puck and wired it into the near corner over Hrabal's shoulder. The end of the period saw a little more rough play but not enough to draw a penalty.

The Gophers picked right up where they left off and a screened point shot from Luke Mittelstadt eluded Hrabal but hit the crossbar and bounced away harmlessly. Massachusetts countered and went on the attack which included a bit of physical play as well. A few long shots reached Soulière but he didn't have too much difficulty making the saves. The two teams then went back and forth for several minutes to no real effect but, around the 12-minute mark, Minnesota generated a few scoring chances. Neither found its mark and UMass was able to get back to its game. Hrabal was forced to make another couple of saves a few minutes later when Minnesota titled the ice once more. With around 8 minutes to play, the Gophers got another good opportunity at the UMass cage. A net front scramble was halted by the Minutemen defense and Hrabal pounced on a loose puck to end the threat. Massachusetts tried to reply with a close-in shot of its own but Lautenbach's chance never fully materialized. A few minutes later Minnesota was able to get into the UMass end and, after failing on its initial chance, moved the puck to an open Connor Kurth in front. The Gopher forward pulled the puck around Hrabal and deposited a backhand into the cage. Now down by two, Massachusetts fought back and upped their forechecking game. After Jack Musa stole the puck in the Gopher end, Cal Thomas slashed him in response and was sent off for 2 minutes. UMass was able to set up their power play in the back half of the man-advantage and nearly ended up scoring on a melee in the goal crease but Soulière managed to keep the puck out and preserve Minnesota's 2-goal lead. The waning seconds passed with more jostling and jawing but, again, no further penalties.

The third began with the physical play continuing but UMass swiftly got to its offensive game. A few minutes in, the Minutemen had a pair of glorious chances; the first was stopped by Soulière's glove and the second rolled off Aydar Suniev's stick before he could get the puck around the sprawling netminder. Massachusetts had no real choice but to open up the game offensively while Minnesota did its level best to prevent any further scoring. The increased pressure eventually ended up with Suniev getting a pass from below the goal line just off to the right of the net and then shooting the puck past Soulière to the left. The Gophers were unhappy about the goal because an apparent tripping penalty down low went uncalled by the refs and led directly to Massachusetts getting its hands on the biscuit. After the fans voice their displeasure over another potential UMass penalty, Massachusetts went back on the attack. After Minnesota was forced into an icing, Soulière went over to the Gopher bench with an equipment problem and Nathan Airey was forced to take over in goal. Right after the ensuing faceoff, Daniel Jenčko deflected the puck past Airey to tie the game. The partisan crowd was silenced by the stunning turn of events and the Minutemen tried to take advantage. Minnesota was soon able to collect itself and countered with two chances from Kurth in tight. As the game stopped for a TV timeout around the 8-minute mark, Soulière returned to the Gopher crease. The teams then began to exchange chances and UMass got a great chance with about 5 minutes to play but was unable to get the shot on goal. A moment later, a pass into the slot from Francesco Dell'Elce was deflected into the top corner of the Gopher cage off of Jimmy Clark's stick. Minnesota was now forced to restart its offence with just 5 minutes to play or their season was over. It took just over a minute for Snuggerud to grab the puck off of a faceoff, skate towards the center of the ice and fire the puck past three Minutemen to tie the match. The goal revitalized the Gophers who began to pressure UMass on both ends of the ice. Massachusetts, however, was undaunted and a hit into the boards by Keenan on Mason Nevers demonstrated as much. Neither team could find another goal before time expired so overtime was needed to settle the score.

Snuggerud tried to end the match early but his hard shot missed the net. Massachusetts then had a few chances of their own that failed to connect. When possession switched back to the Gophers, a shot from Kurth hit of the top of Hrabal's mask and stunned to netminder but he soon recovered and remained in the game. About a minute later the Minnesota faithful groaned when what they believed was an obvious tripping call was let go. The play helped UMass turn over the puck which was then skated up the ice and swiftly deposited into the goal for the winning tally. An angry buzz persisted through the building after the winner but Suniev's second of the night was allowed to stand as the deciding goal. A few objects were thrown onto the ice as the two teams shook hands while Bob Motzko, Minnesota's coach, was visibly angry at the referees.

== Scoring statistics ==
| Name | Position | Games | Goals | Assists | Points | PIM |
|---|---|---|---|---|---|---|
| Jimmy Snuggerud | RW | 40 | 24 | 27 | 51 | 29 |
| Connor Kurth | F | 40 | 18 | 21 | 39 | 10 |
| Matthew Wood | C/LW | 39 | 17 | 22 | 39 | 16 |
| Oliver Moore | C | 38 | 12 | 21 | 33 | 6 |
| Sam Rinzel | D | 40 | 10 | 22 | 32 | 12 |
| Brody Lamb | RW | 39 | 17 | 9 | 26 | 12 |
| Brodie Ziemer | LW/RW | 38 | 12 | 11 | 23 | 21 |
| Jimmy Clark | C/LW | 39 | 5 | 17 | 22 | 0 |
| Ryan Chesley | D | 40 | 8 | 12 | 20 | 48 |
| Michael Koster | D | 40 | 4 | 16 | 20 | 14 |
| Aaron Huglen | C/W | 38 | 5 | 14 | 19 | 10 |
| Erik Påhlsson | C/W | 30 | 3 | 15 | 18 | 6 |
| Luke Mittelstadt | D | 40 | 2 | 16 | 18 | 8 |
| Beckett Hendrickson | C/LW | 39 | 3 | 9 | 12 | 18 |
| Mason Nevers | C | 33 | 6 | 3 | 9 | 4 |
| Cal Thomas | D | 27 | 1 | 8 | 9 | 8 |
| John Mittelstadt | F | 35 | 3 | 5 | 8 | 0 |
| August Falloon | C | 24 | 2 | 3 | 5 | 0 |
| Nick Michael | F | 10 | 1 | 3 | 4 | 17 |
| Leo Gruba | D | 40 | 1 | 2 | 3 | 10 |
| John Whipple | D | 29 | 0 | 3 | 3 | 6 |
| Nathan Airey | G | 19 | 0 | 1 | 1 | 0 |
| Liam Soulière | G | 25 | 0 | 1 | 1 | 0 |
| Axel Begley | D | 15 | 0 | 0 | 0 | 0 |
| Bench | – | – | – | – | – | 6 |
| Total | | | 154 | 261 | 415 | 261 |

== Goaltending statistics ==
| Name | Games | Minutes | Wins | Losses | Ties | Goals against | Saves | Shut outs | SV % | GAA |
|---|---|---|---|---|---|---|---|---|---|---|
| Liam Soulière | 25 | 1406:02 | 13 | 8 | 2 | 55 | 605 | 2 | .917 | 2.35 |
| Nathan Airey | 19 | 1020:50 | 12 | 3 | 2 | 42 | 379 | 1 | .900 | 2.47 |
| Empty Net | - | 12:30 | - | - | - | 3 | - | - | - | - |
| Total | 40 | 2439:22 | 25 | 11 | 4 | 101 | 984 | 3 | .907 | 2.48 |

== Rankings ==
| Poll | Week | | | | | | | | | | | | | | | | | | | | | | | | | | | |
| Poll | Pre | 1 | 2 | 3 | 4 | 5 | 6 | 7 | 8 | 9 | 10 | 11 | 12 | 13 | 14 | 15 | 16 | 17 | 18 | 19 | 20 | 21 | 22 | 23 | 24 | 25 | 26 | 27 (Final) |
|---|---|---|---|---|---|---|---|---|---|---|---|---|---|---|---|---|---|---|---|---|---|---|---|---|---|---|---|---|
| USCHO.com | 6 | 5 | 6 | 5 (1) | 4 (1) | 3 (1) | 3 | 4 | 3 (3) | 4 (1) | 1 (38) | 3 (1) | – | 3 | 3 (1) | 3 | 4 (1) | 4 | 3 | 4 | 5 | 2 (6) | 3 (1) | 5 | 5 | 5 | – | 9 |
| USA Hockey | 5 | 5 | 6 | 5 | 4 | 3т | 3т | 4 | 4 (4) | 4 (1) | 1 (29) | 3 (1) | – | 3 | 3 | 3 | 3 | 4 | 3 | 3 | 4 | 2 | 3 | 4 | 5 | 5 | 9 | 8 |

Note: USCHO did not release a poll in week 12 or 26.
Note: USA Hockey did not release a poll in week 12.

== Awards and honors ==
| Player | Award | Ref |
|---|---|---|
| Sam Rinzel | AHCA All-American West First Team | |
| Jimmy Snuggerud | AHCA All-American West Second Team | |
| Sam Rinzel | Big Ten Defensive Player of the Year | |
| Jimmy Snuggerud | All-Big Ten First Team | |
| Sam Rinzel | All-Big Ten First Team | |

== 2025 NHL entry draft ==
| Round | Pick | Player | NHL team |
|---|---|---|---|
| 2 | 35 | Jacob Rombach ^{†} | Nashville Predators |
| 3 | 80 | Maceo Phillips ^{†} | Calgary Flames |
| 3 | 90 | Mason Moe ^{†} | New Jersey Devils |
| 4 | 113 | John Mooney ^{†} | Montreal Canadiens |
| 7 | 202 | Jacob Kvasnicka ^{†} | New York Islanders |

† incoming freshman
