= Frank Nazar =

American ice hockey player (born 2004)

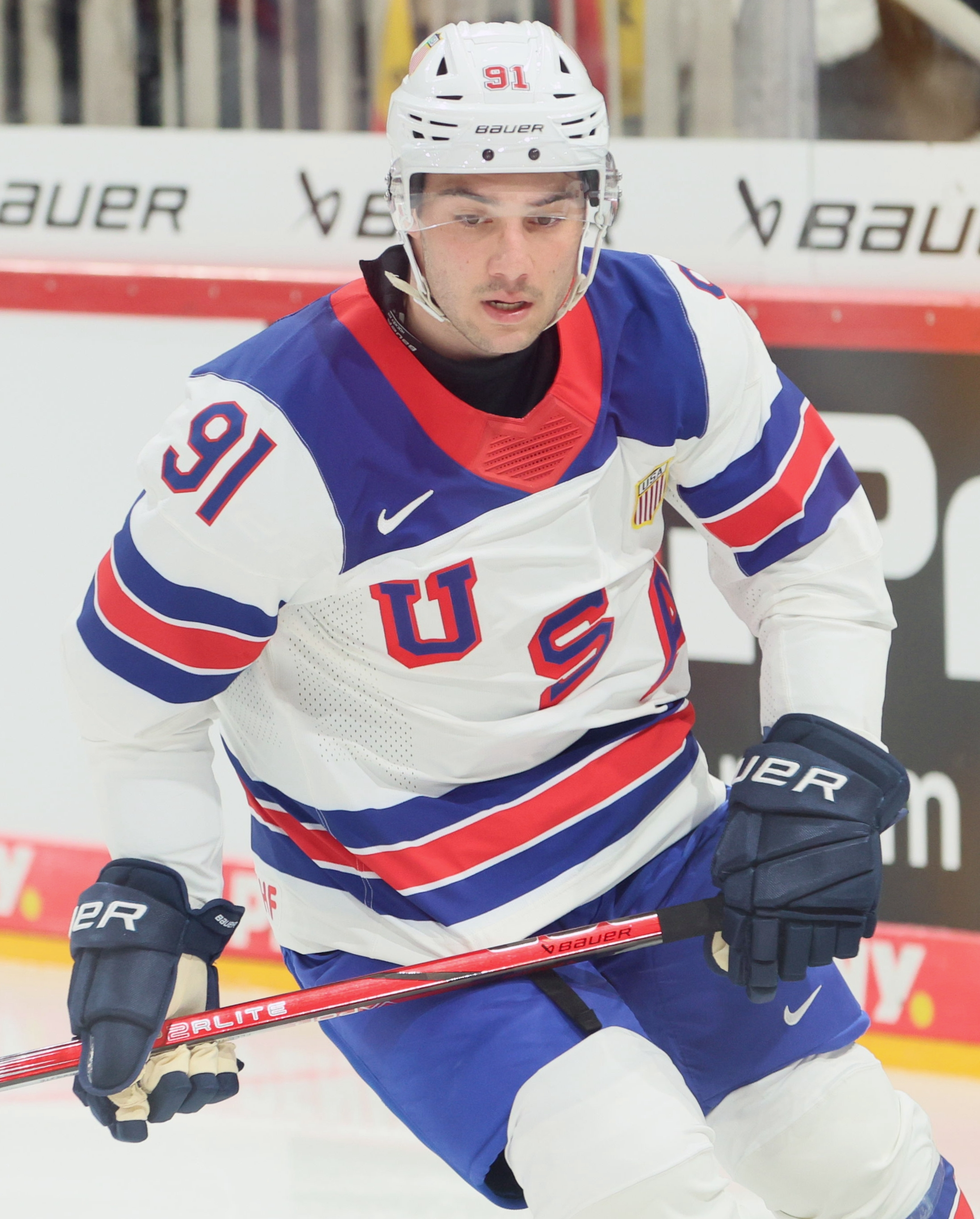
- Nazar with the United States national team in 2025
- Born: January 14, 2004 (age 22) Mount Clemens, Michigan, U.S.
- Height: 5 ft 10 in (178 cm)
- Weight: 190 lb (86 kg; 13 st 8 lb)
- Position: Center
- Shoots: Right
- NHL team: Chicago Blackhawks
- National team: United States
- NHL draft: 13th overall, 2022; Chicago Blackhawks
- Playing career: 2024–present

Frank Nazar III (born January 14, 2004) is an American professional ice hockey player who is a center for the Chicago Blackhawks of the National Hockey League (NHL). He was drafted 13th overall by the Blackhawks in the 2022 NHL entry draft. He played college ice hockey at the University of Michigan.

== Early life ==
Nazar was born January 14, 2004, in Mount Clemens, Michigan, to Frank and Gina Nazar. His grandfather owned a parking garage near Joe Louis Arena and his father became familiar with ice hockey from the Detroit Red Wings fans who parked there, introducing Nazar to the game through a skating party he attended at age 5.

== Playing career ==
Nazar spent two seasons with the USA Hockey National Team Development Program. During the 2021–22 season, he recorded 28 goals and 42 assists in 56 games and ranked third on the team with 70 points. Nazar competed at the 2022 BioSteel All-American Game.

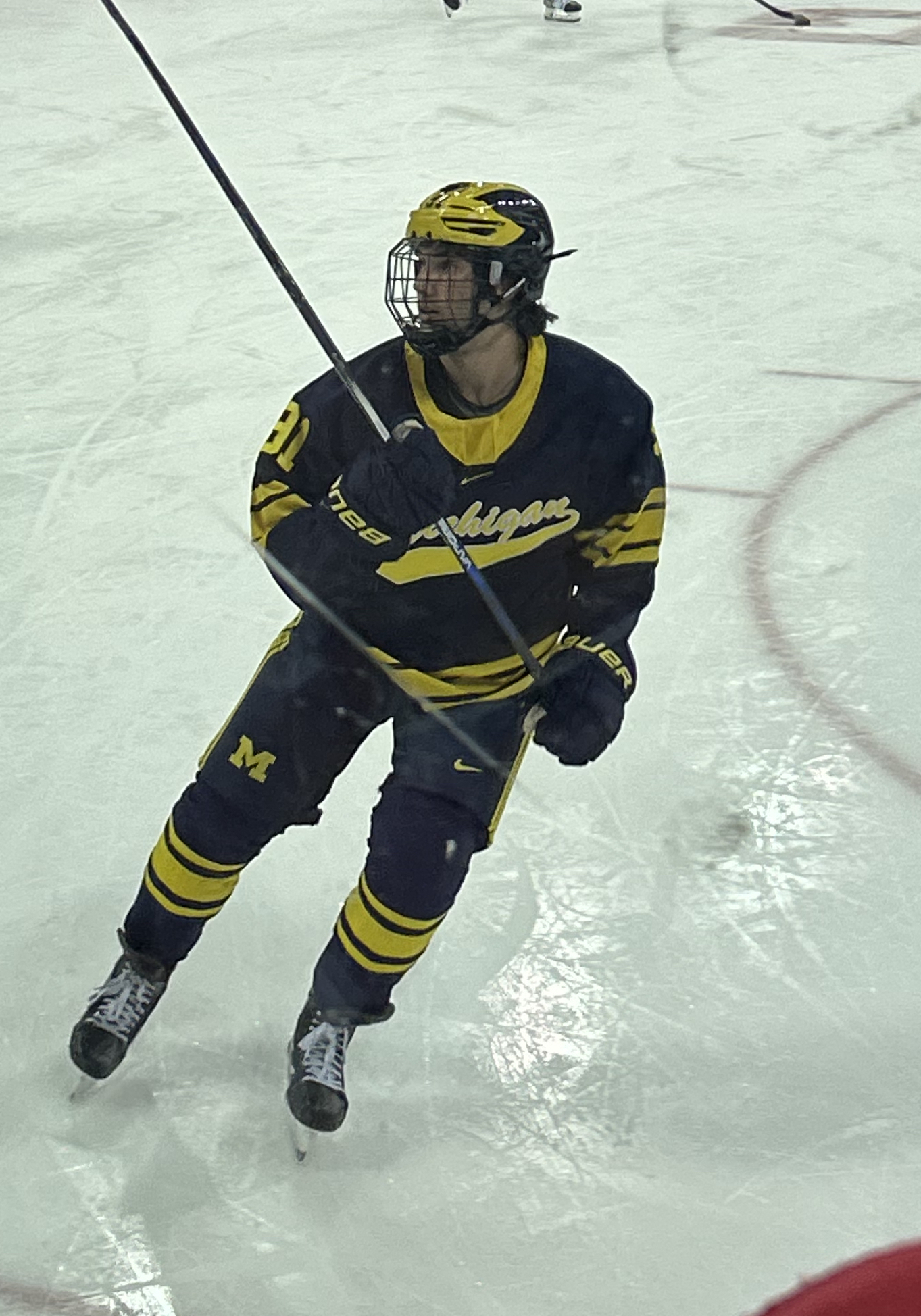
Nazar playing for Michigan during a November 2023 game at the Kohl Center

Nazar committed to play college ice hockey for the Michigan Wolverines during the 2022–23 season. In October 2022 it was announced that a lower body injury Nazar sustained in the offseason required surgery, and he would miss the majority of the season. He made his debut for the Wolverines on February 10, 2023, in a game against Michigan State. He finished his freshman season with two goals and five assists in 13 games. During the 2023–24 season, in his sophomore year, he recorded 17 goals and 24 assists in 41 games. His 17 goals ranked fourth among all Michigan players, while his 24 assists ranked fifth on the team.

Nazar was drafted 13th overall by the Chicago Blackhawks in the 2022 NHL entry draft. On April 13, 2024, he signed a three-year, entry-level contract with the Blackhawks. He made his NHL debut on April 14, 2024, in Chicago's final home game of the regular season. He scored his first career NHL goal on his first shot on goal against Pyotr Kochetkov of the Carolina Hurricanes.

On August 23, 2025, Nazar signed a seven-year, $46.13 million contract with the Blackhawks, which will begin in 2026–27.

== International play ==
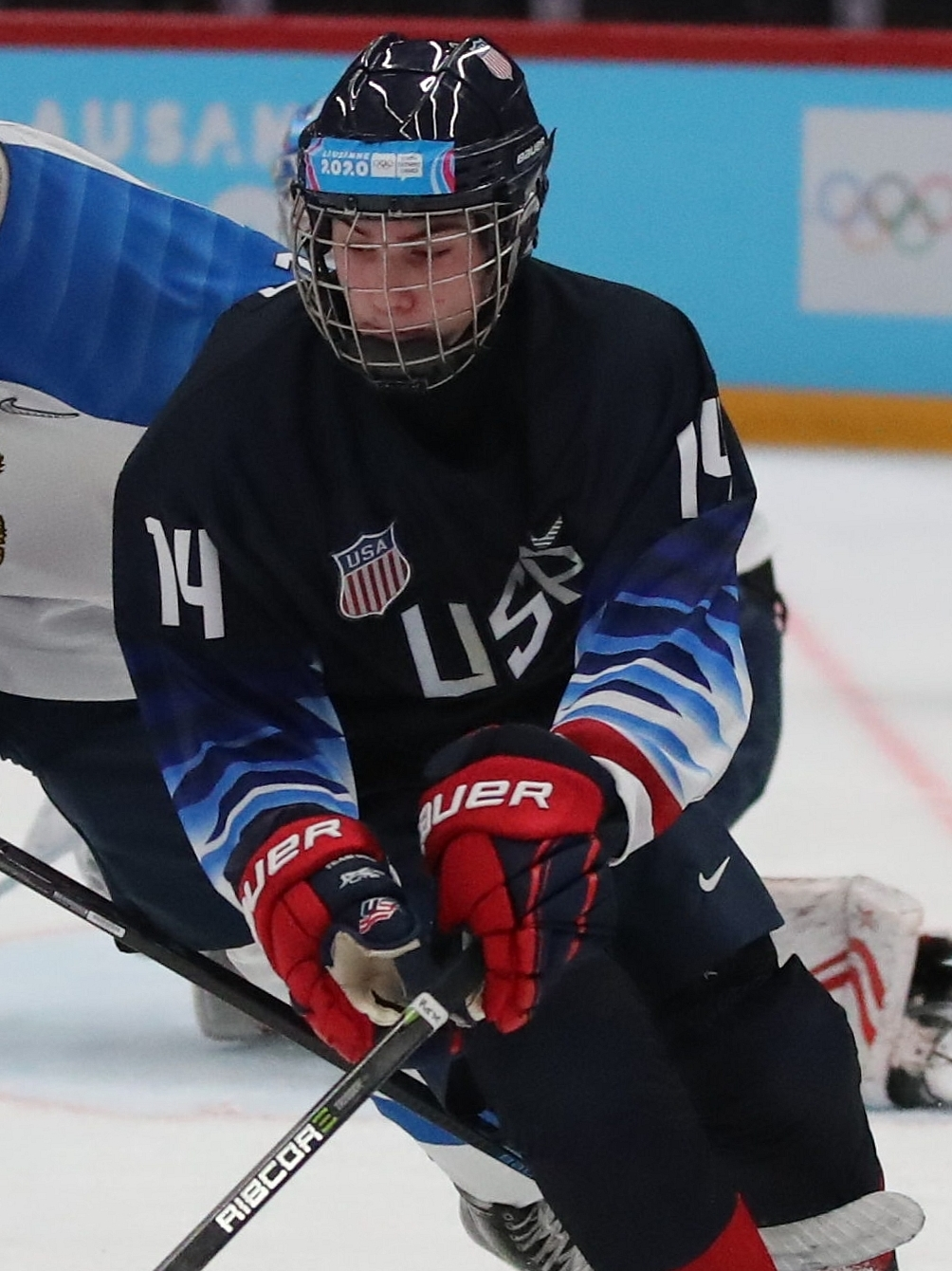
- Nazar at the 2020 Winter Youth Olympics

Medal record

Representing United States

Ice hockey

World Championships
Gold medal – first place	2025 Sweden/Denmark	

World Junior Championships
Gold medal – first place	2024 Sweden	

World U18 Championships
Silver medal – second place	2022 Germany	

Nazar represented the United States at the 2020 Winter Youth Olympics, where he recorded three goals and two assists in four games and won a silver medal.

Nazar represented the United States at the 2022 IIHF World U18 Championships, where he recorded three goals and six assists in six games and won a silver medal.

On December 16, 2023, Nazar was named to the United States' roster to compete at the 2024 World Junior Ice Hockey Championships. During the tournament he recorded eight assists in seven games and won a gold medal.

Nazar made his senior national team debut for the United States at the 2025 IIHF World Championship, where he led the team in scoring with six goals and six assists in ten games and helped Team USA win their first gold medal since 1933.

== Career statistics ==
=== Regular season and playoffs ===
			Regular season					Playoffs
Season	Team	League	GP	G	A	Pts	PIM	GP	G	A	Pts	PIM
2020–21	U.S. National Development Team	USHL	45	28	27	55	20	—	—	—	—	—
2021–22	U.S. National Development Team	USHL	56	28	42	70	20	—	—	—	—	—
2022–23	University of Michigan	B1G	13	2	5	7	0	—	—	—	—	—
2023–24	University of Michigan	B1G	41	17	24	41	18	—	—	—	—	—
2023–24	Chicago Blackhawks	NHL	3	1	0	1	0	—	—	—	—	—
2024–25	Rockford IceHogs	AHL	21	11	13	24	8	—	—	—	—	—
2024–25	Chicago Blackhawks	NHL	53	12	14	26	24	—	—	—	—	—
2025–26	Chicago Blackhawks	NHL	66	15	26	41	26	—	—	—	—	—
NHL totals			122	28	40	68	50	—	—	—	—	—

=== International ===
Year	Team	Event	Result	GP	G	A	Pts	PIM
2022	United States	U18	2nd place, silver medalist(s)	6	3	6	9	4
2024	United States	WJC	1st place, gold medalist(s)	7	0	8	8	2
2025	United States	WC	1st place, gold medalist(s)	10	6	6	12	6
Junior totals				13	3	14	17	6
Senior totals				10	6	6	12	6

Awards and achievements
Preceded by Kevin Korchinski	Chicago Blackhawks first-round draft pick 2022	Succeeded by Sam Rinzel
