= Brandon Naurato =

American ice hockey coach

Current position
- Title: Head Coach
- Team: Michigan
- Conference: Big Ten
- Record: 98–50–10 (.652)

Biographical details
- Born: January 22, 1985 (age 41); Livonia, Michigan, U.S.
- Education: University of Michigan

Playing career
- 2005–2009: Michigan
- 2008–2009: Stockton Thunder
- 2009–2010: Toledo Walleye
- 2009–2010: Port Huron Icehawks
- 2010–2011: Fort Wayne Komets
- 2010–2012: Dayton Gems
- Position: Forward

Coaching career (HC unless noted)
- 2021–2022: Michigan (assistant)
- 2022–present: Michigan

Head coaching record
- Overall: 98–50–10 (.652)
- Tournaments: 6–3 (NCAA) (.750); 10–3 (Big Ten) (.769)

Accomplishments and honors

Championships
- 2× Big Ten tournament (2023, 2026); 3× NCAA Frozen Four (2023, 2024, 2026) (Note: 3× semifinal appearances)

Brandon Naurato (born January 22, 1985) is an American ice hockey coach and former player, currently the Wolverines men's ice hockey head coach at the University of Michigan.

== Playing career ==
Naurato's college career began in the fall of 2005 when he joined the ice hockey team at Michigan. He played for legendary head coach Red Berenson during a very successful time for the program. Naurato provided depth scoring for a Wolverine team that won 109 games during his 4-year tenure, making the NCAA tournament each season. After graduating with a degree in general studies, Naurato played professional hockey for parts of 4 seasons.

== Coaching career ==
Following his playing career, Naurato worked for USA Hockey as the Director of player Development for almost eight years. Near the end of his stint with the organization, he took on additional responsibilities as a player development consultant with the Detroit Red Wings. In August 2021, Naurato joined the staff at his alma mater. During the 2022 offseason, Michigan's head coach, Mel Pearson, was accused of mistreating both players and staff during his tenure with the Wolverines. In early August, Pearson was dismissed from his position and the program scrambled to find his replacement. Because the vacancy happened so close to the start of the next season, the Wolverines were not able to perform a typical hiring search. On August 7, 2022, Michigan promoted Naurato to interim head coach for the 2022–23 season. On March 31, 2023, Naurato was promoted to permanent head coach, agreeing to a five-year contract.

== Career statistics ==
			Regular Season					Playoffs
Season	Team	League	GP	G	A	Pts	PIM	GP	G	A	Pts	PIM
2003–04	Cedar Rapids RoughRiders	USHL	44	9	7	16	18	4	0	1	1	0
2004–05	Cedar Rapids RoughRiders	USHL	49	15	10	25	42	5	0	0	0	4
2005–06	Michigan	CCHA	31	7	3	10	8	—	—	—	—	—
2006–07	Michigan	CCHA	40	12	11	23	34	—	—	—	—	—
2007–08	Michigan	CCHA	34	7	11	18	22	—	—	—	—	—
2008–09	Michigan	CCHA	25	6	7	13	32	—	—	—	—	—
2008–09	Stockton Thunder	ECHL	2	1	1	2	4	10	2	1	3	2
2009–10	Toledo Walleye	ECHL	5	0	2	2	2	—	—	—	—	—
2009–10	Port Huron Icehawks	IHL	61	25	21	46	38	7	2	4	6	6
2010–11	Fort Wayne Komets	CHL	19	2	4	6	22	—	—	—	—	—
2010–11	Dayton Gems	CHL	34	16	18	34	42	3	2	0	2	4
2011–12	Dayton Gems	CHL	59	22	18	40	40	—	—	—	—	—
NCAA totals			130	32	32	64	96	—	—	—	—	—

== Head coaching record ==
Record table
Season	Team	Overall	Conference	Standing	Postseason
Michigan Wolverines (Big Ten) (2022–present)
2022–23	Michigan	26–12–3	12–10–2	2nd	NCAA Frozen Four
2023–24	Michigan	23–15–3	11–11–2	4th	NCAA Frozen Four
2024–25	Michigan	18–15–3	12–10–2	4th	Big Ten quarterfinals
2025–26	Michigan	31–8–1	17–6–1	2nd	NCAA Frozen Four
Michigan:		98–50–10	52–37–7		
Total:		98–50–10	52–37–7		
National champion Postseason invitational champion Conference regular season champion Conference regular season and conference tournament champion Division regular season champion Division regular season and conference tournament champion Conference tournament champion
