= Tyler Duke =

American ice hockey player (born 2004)

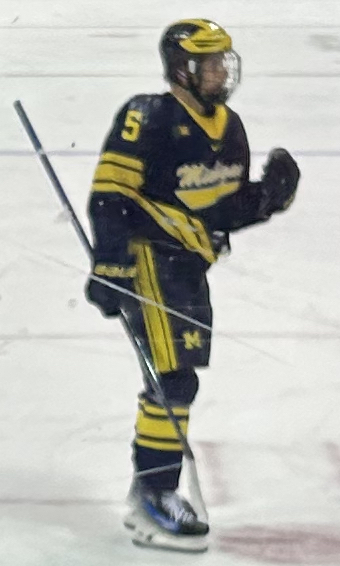
- Duke with Michigan in 2023
- Born: July 19, 2004 (age 22) Strongsville, Ohio, U.S.
- Height: 5 ft 10 in (178 cm)
- Weight: 194 lb (88 kg; 13 st 12 lb)
- Position: Defense
- Shoots: Left
- AHL team: WBS Penguins
- NHL draft: Undrafted
- Playing career: 2026–present

Tyler Duke (born July 19, 2004) is an American professional ice hockey defenseman for the Wilkes-Barre/Scranton Penguins of the American Hockey League (AHL). He is the younger brother of Dylan Duke.

== Playing career ==
=== Junior ===
Duke spent two seasons with the USA Hockey National Team Development Program. During the 2020–21 season, he recorded one goal and 11 assists in 28 games. During the 2021–22 season, he recorded two goals and nine assists in 24 games.

=== College ===
Duke began his college ice hockey at Ohio State. During the 2022–23 season, in his freshman year, he recorded four goals and eight assists in 40 games. He tied for fourth among NCAA defensemen, and tied for first in the Big Ten, with three game-winning goals. On April 22, 2023, he transferred to Michigan, where he joined his brother Dylan Duke.

During the 2023–24 season, in his sophomore year, he recorded two goals and 14 assists in 38 games. During the 2024–25 season, in his junior year, he recorded five goals and eight assists in 29 games, after suffering several injuries.

On September 29, 2025, Duke was named assistant captain for the 2025–26 season. In his senior year, he recorded two goals and 15 assists in 36 games. He ranked second in the nation in plus/minus for defensemen. He led Big Ten defensemen in expected goal differential (66 percent). He recorded the fifth-most minutes among Big Ten defensemen during the regular season and recorded 17 points along with 48 blocked shots. Following the season he was named to the All-Big Ten Second Team.

=== Professional ===
On April 16, 2026 it was announced that Duke signed an AHL contract for the 2026-2027 season with the Wilkes-Barre/Scranton Penguins.

== International play ==
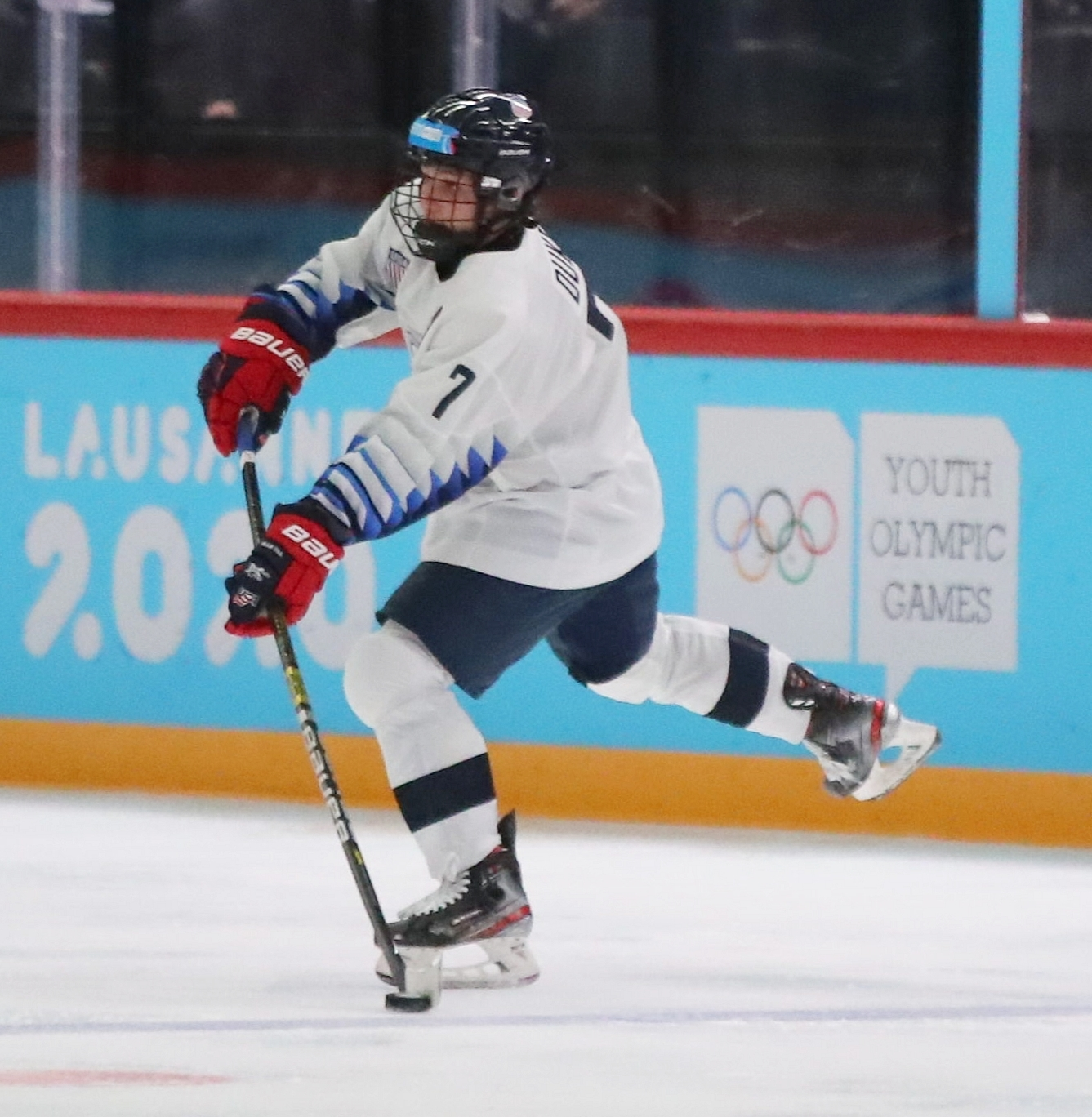
- Duke at the 2020 Winter Youth Olympics

Medal record

Representing the United States

Ice hockey

World U18 Championships
Silver medal – second place	2022 Germany	

Youth Olympic Games
Silver medal – second place	2020 Lausanne	

Duke represented the United States at the 2020 Winter Youth Olympics and won a silver medal.

Duke represented the United States at the 2022 IIHF World U18 Championships, where he recorded two assists in six games and won a silver medal.

== Personal life ==
Duke was born to Steve and Sharon Duke, and has a brother, Dylan, and sister, Alyssa. His father, Steve, played ice hockey at Western Michigan and in both the ECHL and AHL. His brother also played college ice hockey at Michigan.<

== Career statistics ==
=== Regular season and playoffs ===
			Regular season					Playoffs
Season	Team	League	GP	G	A	Pts	PIM	GP	G	A	Pts	PIM
2020–21	U.S. National Development Team	USHL	28	1	11	12	22	—	—	—	—	—
2021–22	U.S. National Development Team	USHL	24	2	9	11	56	—	—	—	—	—
2022–23	Ohio State University	B1G	40	4	8	12	45	—	—	—	—	—
2023–24	University of Michigan	B1G	38	2	14	16	50	—	—	—	—	—
2024–25	University of Michigan	B1G	29	5	8	13	33	—	—	—	—	—
2025–26	University of Michigan	B1G	40	2	16	18	83	—	—	—	—	—
NCAA totals			147	13	46	59	211	—	—	—	—	—

=== International ===
Year	Team	Event	Result	GP	G	A	Pts	PIM
2022	United States	U18	2nd place, silver medalist(s)	6	0	2	2	4
Junior totals				6	0	2	2	4

== Awards and honors ==
Award	Year	Ref
College
All-Big Ten Second Team	2026	
