= Ethan Edwards (ice hockey) =

Canadian ice hockey player (born 2002)

- Edwards with Michigan in 2025
- Born: June 6, 2002 (age 23) Grande Prairie, Alberta, Canada
- Height: 5 ft 10 in (178 cm)
- Weight: 176 lb (80 kg; 12 st 8 lb)
- Position: Defence
- Shoots: Left
- NHL team (P) Cur. team: New Jersey Devils; Utica Comets (AHL)
- NHL draft: 120th overall, 2020; New Jersey Devils
- Playing career: 2025–present

Ethan Edwards (born June 6, 2002) is a Canadian professional ice hockey player who is a defenceman for the Utica Comets of the American Hockey League (AHL), while under contract to the New Jersey Devils of the National Hockey League (NHL). He played college ice hockey at Michigan.

== Playing career ==
=== Junior ===
Edwards spent one season with the Sioux City Musketeers. During the 2020–21 season, he led the team's defencemen in scoring with six goals and 21 assists in 51 regular season game. He was drafted in the fourth round, 120th overall, by the New Jersey Devils in the 2020 NHL entry draft.

=== College ===
Edwards began his collegiate career for the Michigan Wolverines during the 2021–22 season. During his freshman year he recorded three goals and eight assists in 36 games. He scored his first career goal on November 26, 2021, in a game against Niagara. During the 2022–23 season, in his sophomore year, he recorded four goals and ten assists in 37 games, and led the team with 54 blocked shots.

He was named an alternate captain for the 2023–24 season. In his junior year, he suffered a shoulder injury, and missed the first half of the season. He made his season debut on January 12, 2024, and recorded three goals and seven assists in 21 games. During the regional finals of the 2024 NCAA Division I men's ice hockey tournament against Michigan State, he scored a goal and two assists to help Michigan advance to the Frozen Four for the third consecutive year.

During the 2024–25 season, in his senior year, he recorded five goals and 16 assists in 36 games. Following the season he was named to the All-Big Ten Second Team. He finished his collegiate career with 15 goals, 41 assists, and 164 blocked shots in 130 games.

=== Professional ===
On March 25, 2025, Edwards signed a two-year, entry-level contract with the New Jersey Devils starting during the 2025–26 season. He also signed a standard player agreement with the Devils' American Hockey League (AHL) affiliate, the Utica Comets, for the remainder of the 2024–25 season. He finished his first professional season with three assists in 10 games for the Comets. During the 2025–26 season, in his first full professional season, he led all Comets defenceman in scoring with 10 goals and 13 assists in 69 games.

== Personal life ==
Edwards was born to Lee and Tara Edwards, and has a brother, Brett, who played college ice hockey at Denver.

== Career statistics ==
			Regular season					Playoffs
Season	Team	League	GP	G	A	Pts	PIM	GP	G	A	Pts	PIM
2018–19	Spruce Grove Saints	AJHL	10	0	1	1	6	—	—	—	—	—
2019–20	Spruce Grove Saints	AJHL	50	9	24	33	83	6	0	2	2	10
2020–21	Sioux City Musketeers	USHL	51	6	21	27	96	4	1	0	1	6
2021–22	University of Michigan	B1G	36	3	8	11	16	—	—	—	—	—
2022–23	University of Michigan	B1G	37	4	10	14	69	—	—	—	—	—
2023–24	University of Michigan	B1G	21	3	7	10	20	—	—	—	—	—
2024–25	University of Michigan	B1G	36	5	16	21	40	—	—	—	—	—
2024–25	Utica Comets	AHL	10	0	3	3	8	—	—	—	—	—
2025–26	Utica Comets	AHL	69	10	13	23	69	—	—	—	—	—
AHL totals			79	10	16	26	77	—	—	—	—	—

== Awards and honours ==
Award	Year	Ref
College
All-Big Ten Second Team	2025	
