= Jacob Truscott =

American ice hockey player (born 2002)

- Truscott with Michigan in January 2025
- Born: April 12, 2002 (age 24) Port Huron, Michigan, U.S.
- Height: 6 ft 1 in (185 cm)
- Weight: 170 lb (77 kg; 12 st 2 lb)
- Position: Defense
- Shoots: Left
- AHL team (P) Cur. team: Grand Rapids Griffins; Toledo Walleye (ECHL)
- NHL draft: 144th overall, 2020; Vancouver Canucks
- Playing career: 2025–present

Jacob Truscott (born April 12, 2002) is an American professional ice hockey defenseman for the Toledo Walleye of the ECHL while under contract to the Grand Rapids Griffins of the American Hockey League (AHL). He played college ice hockey at Michigan.

== Playing career ==
=== College ===
Truscott began his collegiate career for the Michigan Wolverines during the 2020–21 season. During his freshman year he recorded one goal and four assists in 26 games. He scored his first career goal on November 28, 2020, in a game against Notre Dame. During the 2021–22 season, in his sophomore year, he recorded two goals and 15 assists in 40 games. During the 2022–23 season, in his junior year, he recorded four goals and 12 assists in 23 games. He suffered a season-ending injury on January 21, 2023, in a game against Minnesota.

On October 4, 2023, he was named captain for the 2023–24 season. In his senior year, he recorded two goals and 14 assists in 41 games. He was again named captain for the 2024–25 season. He became the ninth player in program history to captain the team in multiple years and the first since Luke Glendening during the 2010–11 and 2011–12 seasons. As a graduate student, he recorded three goals and 13 assists in 36 games. He led the team with 56 blocked shots. On November 23, 2024, he had a career-best four point game against Penn State. Following the season he won the Derek Hines Unsung Hero Award. He finished his collegiate career with 12 goals and 58 assists in 166 games, and helped lead Michigan to three Frozen Fours and two Big Ten Tournament championships.

=== Professional ===
On October 7, 2020, Truscott was drafted in the fifth round, 144th overall, by the Vancouver Canucks. He became a free agent after not being signed by the Canucks. On April 13, 2025, he signed a two-year contract with the Grand Rapids Griffins of the AHL, starting during the 2025–26 season.

== International play ==
Truscott represented the United States at the 2022 World Junior Ice Hockey Championships where he was scoreless in five games.

== Personal life ==
Truscott was born to Charles and Lori Truscott, and has two brothers, Kyle and Dakota, and one sister, Nicole.

== Career statistics ==
=== Regular season and playoffs ===
			Regular season					Playoffs
Season	Team	League	GP	G	A	Pts	PIM	GP	G	A	Pts	PIM
2018–19	U.S. National Development Team	USHL	33	2	6	8	20	2	1	1	2	0
2019–20	U.S. National Development Team	USHL	19	4	7	11	6	—	—	—	—	—
2020–21	University of Michigan	B1G	26	1	4	5	8	—	—	—	—	—
2021–22	University of Michigan	B1G	40	2	15	17	31	—	—	—	—	—
2022–23	University of Michigan	B1G	23	4	12	16	12	—	—	—	—	—
2023–24	University of Michigan	B1G	41	2	14	16	41	—	—	—	—	—
2024–25	University of Michigan	B1G	36	3	13	16	27	—	—	—	—	—
2025–26	Grand Rapids Griffins	AHL	12	0	3	3	4	—	—	—	—	—
2025–26	Toledo Walleye	ECHL	51	4	19	23	12	12	1	2	3	10
AHL totals			12	0	3	3	4	—	—	—	—	—

=== International ===
Year	Team	Event	Result	GP	G	A	Pts	PIM
2022	United States	WJC	5th	5	0	0	0	0
Junior totals				5	0	0	0	0

== Awards and honors ==
Award	Year
College
Derek Hines Unsung Hero Award	2025
