= Rob Rassey =

American ice hockey coach (born 1984)

Current position
- Title: Head coach
- Team: Harvard
- Conference: ECAC Hockey
- Record: 0–0–0

Biographical details
- Born: September 26, 1984 (age 42); Shelby Township, Michigan, U.S.
- Education: Northeastern University

Playing career
- 2002–2003: Chicago Freeze
- 2003–2005: Youngstown Phantoms
- 2005–2009: Northeastern

Coaching career (HC unless noted)
- 2011–2013: Youngstown Phantoms (Assistant)
- 2013–2019: Harvard (Assistant)
- 2022–2023: Michigan (Assistant)
- 2023–2026: Michigan (Assoc. HC)
- 2026–present: Harvard

Head coaching record
- Overall: 0–0–0 (–)

Rob Rassey (born September 26, 1984) is an American ice hockey coach, and current head coach at Harvard.

== Early life ==
Rassey played college ice hockey at Northeastern from 2006 to 2009. He graduated magna cum laude with a degree in business administration, and then earned his master's degree from Harvard University in 2019.

== Coaching career ==
Rassey began his coaching career as an assistant coach at Harvard, a position he held from 2013 to 2019. He then served as an amateur scout for the Detroit Red Wings from 2019 to 2021. He took over as head coach and general manager for the Omaha Lancers of the United States Hockey League (USHL), midway through the 2021–22 USHL season, as the team earned its first playoff appearance since 2010. On June 23, 2022, he was named head coach for the Sioux Falls Stampede of the USHL.

On August 18, 2022, he was named an assistant coach for Michigan. On July 17, 2023, he was promoted to associate head coach at Michigan. In four years, he helped lead the Wolverines to two Big Ten tournament championships and three Frozen Four appearances.

On June 23, 2026, he was named head coach for Harvard.
