= 2025 Big Ten men's ice hockey tournament =

American college hockey tournament

- Dates: March 7–22, 2025
- Teams: 7
- Finals site: Munn Ice Arena; East Lansing, Michigan
- Champions: Michigan State (2nd title)
- Winning coach: Adam Nightingale (2nd title)
- MVP: Isaac Howard (Michigan State)
- Big Ten men's Ice Hockey Tournaments

The 2025 Big Ten Conference men's ice hockey tournament was the twelfth tournament in conference history. It was played between March 7 and March 22, 2025, on-campus locations. As the tournament winner, Michigan State earned the Big Ten's automatic bid to the 2025 NCAA Division I men's ice hockey tournament.

== Format ==
The tournament featured a format with all games taking place on the campus of the higher-seeded teams. The tournament will open with three best-of-three quarterfinal series, as the second, third and fourth-seeded teams each hosting a series. The top-seeded team had a bye to the single-elimination semifinals. The highest-seeded team remaining after the semifinals hosted the championship game.

== Conference standings ==
2024–25 Big Ten ice hockey Standings
| | Conference record | | | | | | | | | | Overall record | | | | | |
| | GP | W | L | T | OTW | OTL | 3/SW | PTS | GF | GA | GP | W | L | T | GF | GA |
|---|---|---|---|---|---|---|---|---|---|---|---|---|---|---|---|---|
| #6 Michigan State †* | 24 | 15 | 5 | 4 | 2 | 1 | 2 | 50 | 92 | 60 | 37 | 26 | 7 | 4 | 129 | 77 |
| #9 Minnesota † | 24 | 15 | 6 | 3 | 1 | 3 | 0 | 50 | 87 | 62 | 40 | 25 | 11 | 4 | 154 | 101 |
| #11 Ohio State | 24 | 14 | 9 | 1 | 3 | 2 | 0 | 42 | 72 | 62 | 40 | 24 | 14 | 2 | 127 | 106 |
| #17 Michigan | 24 | 12 | 10 | 2 | 5 | 1 | 2 | 36 | 76 | 83 | 36 | 18 | 15 | 3 | 112 | 118 |
| #5 Penn State | 24 | 9 | 11 | 4 | 2 | 1 | 3 | 33 | 78 | 88 | 40 | 22 | 14 | 4 | 139 | 120 |
| Wisconsin | 24 | 7 | 16 | 1 | 1 | 6 | 0 | 27 | 64 | 77 | 37 | 13 | 21 | 3 | 108 | 110 |
| Notre Dame | 24 | 4 | 19 | 1 | 2 | 2 | 1 | 14 | 60 | 97 | 38 | 12 | 25 | 1 | 102 | 127 |
Championship: March 22, 2025 † indicates conference regular season champion * indicates conference tournament champion Rankings: USCHO.com Top 20 Poll

== Bracket ==
Quarterfinals; March 7–9
2 | Minnesota | 2 | 4 | 1
7 | Notre Dame | 3 | 2 | 4
(Teams are reseeded after the Quarterfinal round)
3 | Ohio State | 1 | 3* | 3
6 | Wisconsin | 4 | 2 | 2
4 | Michigan | 5 | 2 | —
5 | Penn State | 6* | 5 | —

Semifinals; March 15
1 | Michigan State | 1
7 | Notre Dame | 0
3 | Ohio State | 4*
5 | Penn State | 3

Championship; March 22
1 | Michigan State | 4**
3 | Ohio State | 3

Note: * denotes overtime periods.

== Results ==
=== Quarterfinals ===
==== (2) Minnesota vs. (7) Notre Dame ====
| March 7 | Notre Dame | 3 – 2 | Minnesota | 3M Arena at Mariucci | Recap |
| Axel Kumlin – (Cole Knuble) – 1:30; Michael Mastrodomenico – (Carter Slaggert, Ian Murphy) – 15:07 | | First period | 19:54 – pp – Matthew Wood – (Sam Rinzel, Jimmy Snuggerud) |
| Brennan Ali – (Unassisted) – 1:18 | | Second period | No scoring |
| No scoring | | Third period | 8:16 – Sam Rinzel – (Mason Nevers, Jimmy Snuggerud) |
| Owen Say (30 saves / 32 shots) | | Goalie stats | Liam Souliere (8 saves / 11 shots); Nathan Airey (13 saves / 13 shots) |

| March 8 | Notre Dame | 2 – 4 | Minnesota | 3M Arena at Mariucci | Recap |
| No scoring | | First period | No scoring |
| Hunter Strand – (Jack Larrigan, Paul Fischer) – 2:40 | | Second period | 12:30 – pp – Oliver Moore – (Brodie Ziemer, Jimmy Snuggerud) |
| Henry Nelson – (Carter Slaggert, Hunter Strand) – 9:42 | | Third period | 4:16 – Connor Kurth – (Jimmy Clark); 7:18 – Matthew Wood – (Connor Kurth, Ryan Chesley); 19:31 – Brodie Ziemer – (Jimmy Snuggerud, Sam Rinzel) |
| Owen Say (31 saves / 35 shots) | | Goalie stats | Nathan Airey (21 saves / 23 shots) |

| March 9 | Notre Dame | 4 – 1 | Minnesota | 3M Arena at Mariucci | Recap |
| Jayden Davis – (Jack Larrigan, Zach Plucinski) – 17:25 | | First period | No scoring |
| Grant Silianoff – (Blake Biondi, Axel Kumlin) – 3:44 | | Second period | No scoring |
| Cole Knuble – (Justin Janicke, Michael Mastrodomenico) – 12:09; Hunter Strand – (Carter Slaggert) – en – 17:40 | | Third period | 8:07 – pp – Matthew Wood – (Sam Rinzel, Oliver Moore) |
| Owen Say (38 saves / 39 shots) | | Goalie stats | Nathan Airey (17 saves / 21 shots) |

| Notre Dame won series 2–1 |

==== (3) Ohio State vs. (6) Wisconsin ====
| March 7 | Wisconsin | 4 – 1 | Ohio State | Nationwide Arena | Recap |
| Ryland Mosley – (Quinn Finley) – 18:51 | | First period | No scoring |
| Owen Mehlenbacher – (Adam Pietila, Tyon Dyck) – 3:04; Simon Tassy – (Zach Schulz, Christian Fitzgerald) – 9:09 | | Second period | No scoring |
| Kyle Kukkonen – (Christian Fitzgerald) – 18:14 | | Third period | 4:19 – Brent Johnson – (Thomas Weis) |
| Tommy Scarfone (28 saves / 29 shots) | | Goalie stats | Logan Terness (30 saves / 34 shots) |

| March 8 | Wisconsin | 2 – 3 | OT | Ohio State | Nationwide Arena | Recap |
| Joe Palodichuk – (Owen Mehlenbacher, Ben Dexheimer) – pp – 16:09 | | First period | | No scoring |
| Kyle Kukkonen – (Cody Laskosky, Joe Palodichuk) – 16:09 | | Second period | | 16:57 – Jake Rozzi – (Ryan Gordon, Sam Deckhut) |
| No scoring | | Third period | | 18:31 – Gunnarwolfe Fontaine – (Davis Burnside, Damien Carfagna) |
| No scoring | | First overtime period | | 7:30 – Riley Thompson – (Aiden Hansen-Bukata, Gunnarwolfe Fontaine) |
| Tommy Scarfone (38 saves / 41 shots) | | Goalie stats | | Logan Terness (31 saves / 33 shots) |

| March 9 | Wisconsin | 2 – 3 | Ohio State | Nationwide Arena | Recap |
| Quinn Finley – (Cody Laskosky, Gavin Morrissey) – pp – 7:01 | | First period | 6:02 – Jake Rozzi – (Ryan Gordon) |
| No scoring | | Second period | No scoring |
| Ryland Mosley – (Quinn Finley, Anthony Kehrer) – 17:18 | | Third period | 9:37 – pp – Davis Burnside – (Gunnarwolfe Fontaine, Damien Carfagna); 12:43 – Max Montes – (Unassisted) |
| Tommy Scarfone (25 saves / 28 shots) | | Goalie stats | Logan Terness (29 saves / 31 shots) |

| Ohio State won series 2–1 |

==== (4) Michigan vs. (5) Penn State ====
| March 7 | Penn State | 6 – 5 | OT | Michigan | Yost Ice Arena | Recap |
| Ben Schoen – (Danny Dzhaniyev, Aiden Fink) – 5:26; Matt DiMarsico – (Charlie Cerrato, JJ Wiebusch) – 8:05; Danny Dzhaniyev – (Ben Schoen, Aiden Fink) – 19:02 | | First period | | 5:42 – Mark Estapa – (William Whitelaw) |
| No scoring | | Second period | | 13:19 – Jackson Hallum – (Tyler Duke) |
| JJ Wiebusch – (Aiden Fink, Jimmy Dowd Jr.) – pp – 6:57; JJ Wiebusch – (Matt DiMarsico, Carter Schade) – 8:57 | | Third period | | 1:47 – pp – Will Horcoff – (T. J. Hughes, Jacob Truscott); 9:06 – Nick Moldenhauer – (Will Horcoff, Tyler Duke); 15:32 – Jackson Hallum – (Ethan Edwards, Hunter Hady) |
| JJ Wiebusch – (Charlie Cerrato, Aiden Fink) – pp – 5:00 | | First overtime period | | No scoring |
| Arsenii Sergeev (21 saves / 26 shots) | | Goalie stats | | Logan Stein (30 saves / 36 shots) |

| March 8 | Penn State | 5 – 2 | Michigan | Yost Ice Arena | Recap |
| Nicholas DeGraves – (Ben Schoen, Dylan Lugris) – 1:37; Ben Schoen – (Reese Laubach, Simon Mack) – pp – 18:07 | | First period | 1:23 – Nick Moldenhauer – (Unassisted) |
| Carson Dyck – (Nicholas DeGraves, Dylan Lugris) – 10:45; JJ Wiebusch – (Carter Schade, Charlie Cerrato) – 17:33 | | Second period | 11:42 – pp – William Whitelaw – (T. J. Hughes, Michael Hage) |
| Charlie Cerrato – (Unassisted) – pn – 17:07 | | Third period | No scoring |
| Arsenii Sergeev (31 saves / 33 shots) | | Goalie stats | Logan Stein (32 saves / 37 shots) |

| Penn State won series 2–0 |

=== Semifinals ===
==== (1) Michigan State vs. (7) Notre Dame ====
| March 15 | Notre Dame | 0 – 1 | Michigan State | Munn Ice Arena | Recap |
| No scoring | | First period | No scoring |
| No scoring | | Second period | No scoring |
| No scoring | | Third period | 0:19 – pp – Isaac Howard – (Karsen Dorwart, Matt Basgall) |
| Owen Say (45 saves / 46 shots) | | Goalie stats | Trey Augustine (18 saves / 18 shots) |

==== (3) Ohio State vs. (5) Penn State ====
| March 15 | Penn State | 3 – 4 | OT | Ohio State | Value City Arena | Recap |
| No scoring | | First period | | 10:37 – Gunnarwolfe Fontaine – (Aiden Hansen-Bukata, Damien Carfagna) |
| Ben Schoen – (Dylan Lugris) – 2:08; JJ Wiebusch – (Aiden Fink, Matt DiMarsico) – pp – 9:05 | | Second period | | No scoring |
| Matt DiMarsico – (Carter Schade, Charlie Cerrato) – 14:05 | | Third period | | 9:19 – Nathan Lewis – (Max Montes, James Hong); 11:36 – Patrick Guzzo – (Jake Dunlap, Joe Dunlap) |
| No scoring | | First overtime period | | 14:31 – Gunnarwolfe Fontaine – (Riley Thompson, Davis Burnside) |
| Arsenii Sergeev (38 saves / 42 shots) | | Goalie stats | | Logan Terness (31 saves / 34 shots) |

=== Championship ===
==== (1) Michigan State vs. (3) Ohio State ====
| March 22 | Ohio State | 3 – 4 | 2OT | Michigan State | Munn Ice Arena | Recap |
| Joe Dunlap – (Damien Carfagna, Aiden Hansen-Bukata) – 17:51 | | First period | | 7:39 – pp – Karsen Dorwart – (Isaac Howard, Nicklas Andrews); 11:41 – pp – Isaac Howard – (Karsen Dorwart) |
| No scoring | | Second period | | No scoring |
| Damien Carfagna – (Joe Dunlap, Aiden Hansen-Bukata) – 12:46; Gunnarwolfe Fontaine – (Riley Thompson, Aiden Hansen-Bukata) – 17:39 | | Third period | | 0:42 – Tanner Kelly – (Isaac Howard, David Gucciardi) |
| No scoring | | Second overtime period | | 15:09 – Isaac Howard – (Charlie Stramel, Daniel Russell) |
| Logan Terness (47 saves / 51 shots) | | Goalie stats | | Trey Augustine (38 saves / 41 shots) |

== Tournament awards ==
=== All-Tournament Team ===
- G: Trey Augustine (Michigan State)
- D: Matt Basgall (Michigan State)
- D: Damien Carfagna (Ohio State)
- F: Gunnarwolfe Fontaine (Ohio State)
- F: Isaac Howard *(Michigan State)
- F: JJ Wiebusch (Penn State)

* Most Outstanding Player
