= 2024–25 Michigan State Spartans men's ice hockey season =

Co-Big Ten, Champion Big Ten Tournament, Champion Great Lakes Invitational, Champion NCAA Tournament, Regional Semifinal
- Conference: T–1st Big Ten
- Home ice: Munn Ice Arena

Rankings
- USCHO: #6
- USA Hockey: #6

Record
- Overall: 26–7–4
- Conference: 15–5–4
- Home: 12–3–2
- Road: 10–3–2
- Neutral: 4–1–0

Coaches and captains
- Head coach: Adam Nightingale
- Assistant coaches: Jared DeMichiel; Mike Towns
- Captain: Red Savage
- Alternate captain(s): Matt Basgall; Karsen Dorwart; Tiernan Shoudy

The 2024–25 Michigan State Spartans men's ice hockey season was the 83rd season of play for the program and 34th in the Big Ten. The Spartans represented Michigan State University in the 2024–25 NCAA Division I men's ice hockey season, played their home games at the Munn Ice Arena and were coached by Adam Nightingale in his third season. The Spartans finished the season 25–10–3 and 16–6–2 in Big Ten play to earn a share of the regular season conference championship for the second year in a row. They defeated Notre Dame and Ohio State to win the Big Ten tournament championship for the second consecutive season. They received a No. 1 seed in the NCAA tournament where they were upset in the regional semifinal by Cornell.

== Offseason ==
=== Departures ===
Player	Position	Nationality	Cause
Owen Baker	Forward	United States	Transferred to Michigan Tech
Gavin Best	Forward	United States	Transferred to Ferris State
James Crossman	Defenseman	United States	Graduation (signed with Vail Yeti)
Jeremy Davidson	Forward	United States	Graduation (signed with South Carolina Stingrays)
Viktor Hurtig	Defenseman	Sweden	Transferred to Michigan Tech
Reed Lebster	Forward	United States	Graduation (signed with Florida Everblades)
Artyom Levshunov	Defenseman	Belarus	Signed professional contract (Chicago Blackhawks)
Jon Mor	Goaltender	United States	Graduation (retired)
Nicolas Müller	Forward	Switzerland	Graduation (signed with EHC Biel)
Nash Nienhuis	Defenseman	Canada	Graduation (signed with EC Red Bull Salzburg)

=== Recruiting and incoming transfers ===
Player	Position	Nationality	Age	Notes
Nicklas Andrews	Defenseman	United States	23	Canton, MI; graduate transfer from Colorado College
Mikey DeAngelo	Forward	United States	19	Itasca, IL
Dolan Gilbert	Goaltender	United States	23	South Bend, IN; transfer from Concordia
Vladislav Lukashevich	Defenseman	Russia	21	Magadan, RUS; selected 120th overall in 2021
Nathan Mackie	Forward	Canada	20	Prince George, BC
Kaden Nelson	Forward	United States	19	Duluth, MN
Charlie Stramel	Forward	United States	19	Rosemount, MN; transfer from Wisconsin; selected 21st overall in 2023
Shane Vansaghi	Forward	United States	17	St. Louis, MO
Owen West	Defenseman	United States	20	Pittsboro, IN

== Season summary ==
=== Regular season ===
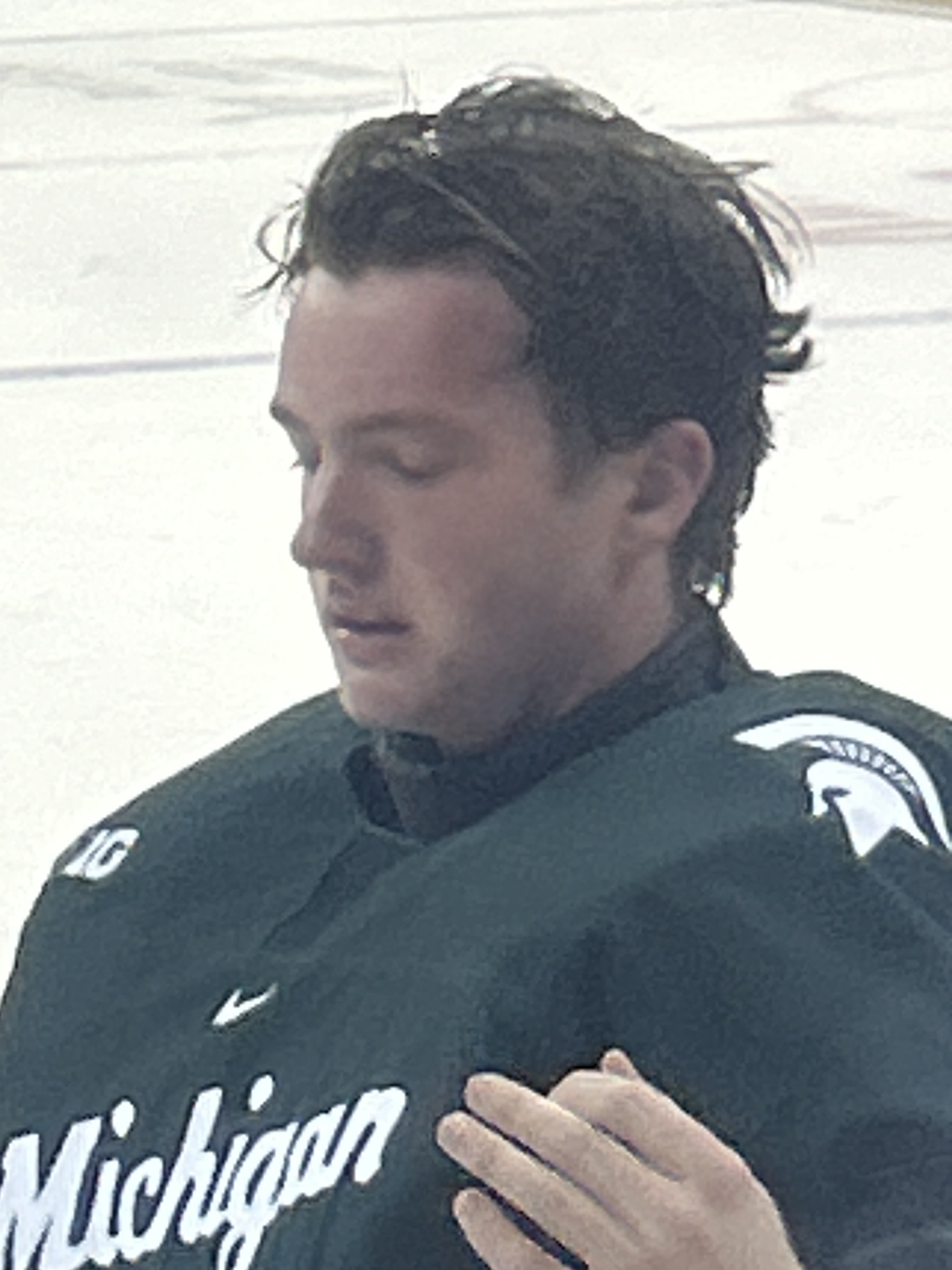
Trey Augustine in December

Fresh off of their first NCAA tournament appearance in over a decade, Michigan State sought to prove that the program was back among the national elites and not just a one-hit-wonder. While the Spartans were sad to see Artyom Levshunov depart after just one season, the team did retain two of their other major pieces; Trey Augustine was already well established as the Spartan's starting goaltender in just his sophomore season. Additionally, Isaac Howard had led the club in scoring in his first season in East Lansing and appeared primed for a breakout year. MSU also was able to add a top prospect in Charlie Stramel, who arrived after two rather pedestrian seasons in Wisconsin.

From the start of the season, Michigan State believed it had something special brewing. Augustine was nigh unbeatable on most nights with the team allowing less than 2 goals per game through the first 12 games of the season. Howard, meanwhile, led the offense as it tortured opposing netminders and rolled to victory after victory. Though the first 12 games, the team's only blemish was a split with Boston College, however, as both were consistently ranked as either #1 or #2 throughout the season, the Spartans had nothing to be ashamed of for that defeat. The first bad loss the team suffered came in early December when the entire roster had an off-night against Wisconsin. They swiftly regained their composure and finished off the first half of their schedule by downing Minnesota, who had briefly snuck up to #1 in the polls, and reclaimed their crown as the top team in the nation.

Augustine left the team during the winter break to take part in the World Junior Championships. While he would backstop Team USA to a gold medal, his participation kept him away from Michigan State for several weeks. Fortunately for the Spartans, they had a capable backup in Luca Di Pasquo, who won every game he started that season. Michigan State was able to make an even greater case for their #1 position by defeating Western Michigan at the Great Lakes Invitational, giving them victories over the best teams in both Hockey East and the NCHC that season.

Upon Augustine's return to the lineup, Michigan State began heading though a murderer's row of opponents. The Spartans would play 10 consecutive games against ranked teams and, predictably, they were not able to replicate their early-season winning streak. The team was not helped by losing team captain Red Savage to a season-sending dislocated shoulder on January 17, which put even more emphasis on Howard. MSU battled through the difficult stretch, taking everything their conference foes could bring to bear. While Michigan State did not get through unscathed, finishing with an acceptable .500 mark, they were not punished for their lack of dominance. In fact, by the end of the regular season, Michigan State was the #2 team in both the national polls as well as the PairWise rankings and was guaranteed a place in the NCAA tournament.

=== Season standings ===
2024–25 Big Ten ice hockey Standings
	Conference record										Overall record					
	GP	W	L	T	OTW	OTL	3/SW	PTS	GF	GA	GP	W	L	T	GF	GA
#6 Michigan State †*	24	15	5	4	2	1	2	50	92	60	37	26	7	4	129	77
#9 Minnesota †	24	15	6	3	1	3	0	50	87	62	40	25	11	4	154	101
#11 Ohio State	24	14	9	1	3	2	0	42	72	62	40	24	14	2	127	106
#17 Michigan	24	12	10	2	5	1	2	36	76	83	36	18	15	3	112	118
#5 Penn State	24	9	11	4	2	1	3	33	78	88	40	22	14	4	139	120
Wisconsin	24	7	16	1	1	6	0	27	64	77	37	13	21	3	108	110
Notre Dame	24	4	19	1	2	2	1	14	60	97	38	12	25	1	102	127
Championship: March 22, 2025 † indicates conference regular season champion * indicates conference tournament champion Rankings: USCHO.com Top 20 Poll

=== Big Ten tournament ===
MSU had ended the year in a tie for the Big Ten Championship. Fortunately for the Spartans, they had won their season series against Minnesota, which enabled them to receive a bye into the conference semifinals. The week off gave Michigan Stat time to rest and recuperate from their arduous schedule and kick off their postseason run against Notre Dame. While the Spartans were the heavy favorites in the match, the season had revealed a potential flaw in MSU title hopes. Howard was the driving force behind Michigan State's offense and led the conference in scoring. There was, however, a sizable gulf between him and the next best Spartan; Karsen Dorwart ended the year more than 20 points back of Howard and had half the number of goals. While MSU did not have a bad offense, it had become a bit top-heavy and could suffer if Howard was not on his game.

The vulnerability of Michigan State was demonstrated against the Irish when MSU failed to take advantage of several opportunities through the first two periods. While they had vastly outshout Notre Dame (36–14) and had been given four separate power plays, the Spartans had nothing to show for their efforts. The only saving grace for the team was that Augustine was able to keep his side of the ledger spotless. The start of the third finally saw Howard convert on the man-advantage but, again, Michigan State was unable to build on that goal. The Fighting Irish's toothless attack allowed MSU to escape with a 1–0 win but the team knew it could not afford a repeat performance. The club learn well from the experience and when Ohio State took several penalties in the first, the Spartans made them pay. MSU scored twice on the man-advantage and would need every goal they could get as the Buckeyes refused to just roll over. Augustine was stellar in goal and kept Michigan State in front through the first two periods. Tanner Kelly's marker early in the third made the score 3–1 for MSU and the team tried to close ranks and whittle away the remainder of the match. Ohio State had other ideas and ramped up their offensive pressure in the third, scoring twice over the final 8 minutes to tie the game. Michigan State held on to force overtime and the two teams fought through a back-and-forth period but to no avail. In the second overtime, OSU began to weaken in the face of the Spartan attack. MSU controlled the puck for large swathes of the fifth period, but it still took over 15 minutes for the winning goal to be scored. Howard managed to find a soft spot in front of the net and fired what looked to be a rather harmless shot through a sea of legs and into the goal. It was Howard's second goal and fourth point of the game, giving him points on all of Michigan State's five postseason goals and earning him the tournament MVP.

=== NCAA tournament ===
March 27, 2025; 5:30 pm	(1) Michigan State	3–4 (2–1, 1–1, 0–2)	(4) Cornell	Huntington Center; Attendance: 6,937

Game reference

Trey Augustine
Goalies
Ian Shane
Referees:
Geoff Miller
Terrance Murphy
Linesmen:
Bill Kingdon
Jeff McCorkle

(Larson, Dorwart) Gavin O'Connell (6) – 07:20	1–0
	1–1	15:02 – Ryan Walsh (15) (Robertson, Mack)
(Stramel, Howard) Daniel Russell (13) – PP – 19:31	2–1
	2–2	36:30 – Charlie Major (4) (Stanley)
(Štrbák, O'Connell) Karsen Dorwart (13) – 36:47	3–2
	3–3	52:38 – Ryan Walsh (16) (Robertson)
	3–4	59:50 – GW PP – Sullivan Mack (17) (Major, Fegaras)

2 min
Penalties
2 min
37
Shots
21

Game summary

Michigan State's second consecutive Big Ten championship earned them the #2 overall seed as well as a priority seeding for the Toledo Regional. The Spartans were set against Cornell, who had only made the tournament thanks to a conference championship, but did possess a good deal of experience with their veteran lineup. The start of the game went largely to form with MSU dominating for most of the first two periods. Michigan State had more than three times the number of shots as the Big Red, however, the Spartans were unable to put any distance between them. Cornell's outstanding defense prevented the Spartans from being able to extend their lead beyond a single goal and, even though they were quick to respond to both of Cornell's markers, the two were separated by just a one goal entering the third. The rope-a-dope style that Cornell employed appeared to pay dividends in the third as the Big Red were able to turn momentum in their favor by calling upon their reserves while the Spartans appeared fatigued. Cornell tied the game in the latter half of the period but, unlike before, MSU was unable to swiftly get back into the lead. As time ticked away, Michigan State slipped up and took their first penalty of the match with about 100 seconds left on the clock. The penalty kill did yeoman's work to try and bleed the clock and force overtime but, they were unable to stop Cornell from setting up in the zone. After a few chances were stopped by Augustine, the goaltender was beat by a brilliant one-timer with just 10 seconds left in the game. The team and the fans were both stunned at the shocking turn of events. On the ensuing faceoff, MSU knew they had little chance to survive and mere seconds later the final horn sounded an ending to the Spartan's season.

== Roster ==
As of August 20, 2024.

No.	Nat.	Player	Class	Pos	Height	Weight	DoB	Hometown	Previous team	NHL rights
1	(United States)	Trey Augustine	Sophomore	G	6' 1" (1.85 m)	179 lb (81 kg)	2005-02-23	South Lyon, Michigan	USNTDP (USHL)	DET, 41st overall 2023
2	(United States)	Patrick Geary	Sophomore	D	6' 1" (1.85 m)	185 lb (84 kg)	2004-02-18	Hamburg, New York	Waterloo Black Hawks (USHL)	BUF, 172nd overall 2024
6	(United States)	Austin Oravetz	Sophomore	D	5' 9" (1.75 m)	192 lb (87 kg)	2003-09-26	Canonsburg, Pennsylvania	Green Bay Gamblers (USHL)	—
7	(Canada)	David Gucciardi	Senior	D	6' 1" (1.85 m)	190 lb (86 kg)	2002-10-09	Toronto, Ontario	Waterloo Black Hawks (USHL)	WSH, 213th overall 2022
8	(Slovakia)	Maxim Štrbák	Sophomore	D	6' 2" (1.88 m)	205 lb (93 kg)	2005-04-13	Košice, Slovakia	Sioux Falls Stampede (USHL)	BUF, 45th overall 2023
9	(United States)	Matt Basgall (A)	Junior	D	5' 9" (1.75 m)	190 lb (86 kg)	2002-08-16	Lake Forest, Illinois	Tri-City Storm (USHL)	—
10	(Finland)	Tommi Männistö	Sophomore	F	6' 0" (1.83 m)	185 lb (84 kg)	2004-02-07	Riihimäki, Finland	Tappara U20 (U20 SM-sarja)	—
11	(United States)	Owen West	Freshman	D	5' 11" (1.8 m)	179 lb (81 kg)	2004-06-01	Pittsboro, Indiana	Des Moines Buccaneers (USHL)	—
12	(United States)	Griffin Jurecki	Sophomore	F	5' 10" (1.78 m)	182 lb (83 kg)	2003-05-03	Grosse Ile, Michigan	Omaha Lancers (USHL)	—
13	(United States)	Tiernan Shoudy (A)	Junior	F	5' 9" (1.75 m)	180 lb (82 kg)	2002-03-15	St. Clair, Michigan	Youngstown Phantoms (USHL)	—
15	(United States)	Charlie Stramel	Junior	F	6' 3" (1.91 m)	215 lb (98 kg)	2004-10-15	Rosemount, Minnesota	Wisconsin (Big Ten)	MIN, 21st overall 2023
16	(Russia)	Vladislav Lukashevich	Freshman	D	6' 1" (1.85 m)	172 lb (78 kg)	2003-05-23	Magadan, Russia	Tri-City Storm (USHL)	FLA, 120th overall 2021
17	(United States)	Kaden Nelson	Freshman	F	6' 0" (1.83 m)	170 lb (77 kg)	2003-05-23	Duluth, Minnesota	Oklahoma Warriors (NAHL)	—
18	(United States)	Joey Larson	Junior	F	6' 1" (1.85 m)	194 lb (88 kg)	2001-03-27	Brighton, Michigan	Northern Michigan (CCHA)	—
19	(United States)	Mikey DeAngelo	Freshman	F	5' 11" (1.8 m)	198 lb (90 kg)	2004-11-19	Itasca, Illinois	Green Bay Gamblers (USHL)	—
20	(United States)	Daniel Russell	Junior	F	5' 9" (1.75 m)	160 lb (73 kg)	2001-11-16	Traverse City, Michigan	Sioux Falls Stampede (USHL)	—
21	(United States)	Red Savage (C)	Senior	F	5' 11" (1.8 m)	185 lb (84 kg)	2003-05-15	Scottsdale, Arizona	Miami (NCHC)	DET, 114th overall 2021
22	(United States)	Isaac Howard	Junior	F	5' 11" (1.8 m)	190 lb (86 kg)	2004-03-30	Hudson, Wisconsin	Minnesota Duluth (NCHC)	TBL, 31st overall 2022
23	(United States)	Shane Vansaghi	Freshman	F	6' 2" (1.88 m)	207 lb (94 kg)	2006-10-11	St. Louis, Missouri	USNTDP (USHL)	—
24	(Canada)	Nathan Mackie	Freshman	F	5' 11" (1.8 m)	163 lb (74 kg)	2004-06-03	Prince George, British Columbia	Salmon Arm Silverbacks (BCHL)	—
26	(United States)	Tanner Kelly	Senior	F	5' 10" (1.78 m)	175 lb (79 kg)	2002-05-11	San Diego, California	Muskegon Lumberjacks (USHL)	—
27	(United States)	Nicklas Andrews	Graduate	D	5' 10" (1.78 m)	193 lb (88 kg)	2001-07-06	Canton, Michigan	Colorado College (NCHC)	—
28	(United States)	Karsen Dorwart (A)	Junior	F	6' 1" (1.85 m)	191 lb (87 kg)	2002-09-17	Sherwood, Oregon	Sioux Falls Stampede (USHL)	—
29	(United States)	Gavin O'Connell	Sophomore	F	6' 0" (1.83 m)	181 lb (82 kg)	2004-02-19	Wayzata, Minnesota	Waterloo Black Hawks (USHL)	—
30	(United States)	Dolan Gilbert	Junior	G	6' 2" (1.88 m)	174 lb (79 kg)	2001-04-25	South Bend, Indiana	Concordia (NCHA)	—
31	(United States)	Luca Di Pasquo	Sophomore	G	6' 0" (1.83 m)	201 lb (91 kg)	2003-09-24	Livonia, Michigan	Penticton Vees (BCHL)	—

== Schedule and results ==
Date	Time	Opponent^{#}	Rank^{#}	Site	TV	Decision	Result	Attendance	Record
Regular season
October 4	6:00 pm	at Lake Superior State*	#4	Taffy Abel Arena • Sault Ste. Marie, Michigan	Midco Sports+	Augustine	W 2–1 ^{OT}	2,542	1–0–0
October 5	4:00 pm	at Lake Superior State*	#4	Taffy Abel Arena • Sault Ste. Marie, Michigan	Midco Sports+	Augustine	W 5–1	1,847	2–0–0
October 11	6:00 pm	#2 Boston College*	#4	Munn Ice Arena • East Lansing, Michigan	BTN	Augustine	L 0–3	6,555	2–1–0
October 12	6:00 pm	#2 Boston College*	#4	Munn Ice Arena • East Lansing, Michigan	BTN+	Augustine	W 4–3	6,555	3–1–0
October 18	6:00 pm	Windsor*	#4	Munn Ice Arena • East Lansing, Michigan (Exhibition)	BTN+	Augustine	W 5–0	6,555	
October 25	7:00 pm	at Canisius*	#4	LECOM Harborcenter • Buffalo, New York	FloHockey	Augustine	W 3–0	1,729	4–1–0
October 26	7:00 pm	at Canisius*	#4	LECOM Harborcenter • Buffalo, New York	FloHockey	Di Pasquo	W 4–1	1,604	5–1–0
November 8	7:00 pm	#13 Ohio State	#4	Munn Ice Arena • East Lansing, Michigan	BTN+	Augustine	W 4–2	6,555	6–1–0 (1–0–0)
November 9	7:00 pm	#13 Ohio State	#4	Munn Ice Arena • East Lansing, Michigan	BTN+	Augustine	W 4–1	6,555	7–1–0 (2–0–0)
November 15	7:00 pm	Notre Dame	#4	Munn Ice Arena • East Lansing, Michigan	BTN+	Augustine	W 8–3	6,555	8–1–0 (3–0–0)
November 16	8:00 pm	Notre Dame	#4	Munn Ice Arena • East Lansing, Michigan	BTN+	Augustine	W 4–3	6,555	9–1–0 (4–0–0)
November 21	7:00 pm	at UNTDP*	#2	USA Hockey Arena • Plymouth, Michigan (Exhibition)	USAHockeyTV.Com	Augustine	W 6–2	3,819	
November 29	7:00 pm	Lindenwood*	#1	Munn Ice Arena • East Lansing, Michigan	BTN+	Augustine	W 4–0	6,555	10–1–0
December 1	4:00 pm	Lindenwood*	#1	Munn Ice Arena • East Lansing, Michigan	BTN+	Di Pasquo	W 2–0	6,555	11–1–0
December 6	8:00 pm	at Wisconsin	#1	Kohl Center • Madison, Wisconsin	BTN+	Augustine	L 0–4	9,326	11–2–0 (4–1–0)
December 7	8:00 pm	at Wisconsin	#1	Kohl Center • Madison, Wisconsin	BTN	Augustine	W 3–2 ^{OT}	11,063	12–2–0 (5–1–0)
December 13	8:30 pm	at #1 Minnesota	#3	3M Arena at Mariucci • Minneapolis, Minnesota	BTN	Augustine	T 3–3 ^{SOW}	9,713	12–2–1 (5–1–1)
December 14	6:00 pm	at #1 Minnesota	#3	3M Arena at Mariucci • Minneapolis, Minnesota	BTN+	Augustine	W 5–3	9,922	13–2–1 (6–1–1)
Great Lakes Invitational
December 29	7:00 pm	vs. Northern Michigan*	#1	Van Andel Arena • Grand Rapids, Michigan (Great Lakes Invitational Semifinal)	Midco Sports+	Di Pasquo	W 2–0	9,900	14–2–1
December 30	7:00 pm	vs. #4 Western Michigan*	#1	Van Andel Arena • Grand Rapids, Michigan (Great Lakes Invitational Championship)	Midco Sports+	Di Pasquo	W 3–1	6,857	15–2–1
Regular season
January 2	6:30 pm	Wisconsin	#1	Munn Ice Arena • East Lansing, Michigan	BTN	Di Pasquo	W 4–3	6,555	16–2–1 (7–1–1)
January 4	9:00 pm	vs. Wisconsin	#1	Wrigley Field • Chicago, Illinois (The Frozen Confines)	BTN	Di Pasquo	W 4–3 ^{OT}	24,788	17–2–1 (8–1–1)
January 10	7:00 pm	at Penn State	#1	Pegula Ice Arena • University Park, Pennsylvania	BTN+	Di Pasquo	W 6–4	5,665	18–2–1 (9–1–1)
January 11	6:00 pm	at Penn State	#1	Pegula Ice Arena • University Park, Pennsylvania	BTN+	Augustine	T 2–2 ^{SOL}	6,020	18–2–2 (9–1–2)
January 17	7:00 pm	at #10 Michigan	#1	Yost Ice Arena • Ann Arbor, Michigan (Rivalry)	BTN+	Augustine	L 2–3 ^{OT}	5,800	18–3–2 (9–2–2)
January 18	6:00 pm	#10 Michigan	#1	Munn Ice Arena • East Lansing, Michigan (Rivalry)	BTN	Augustine	W 4–1	6,555	19–3–2 (10–2–2)
January 24	7:00 pm	#4 Minnesota	#2	Munn Ice Arena • East Lansing, Michigan	BTN+	Augustine	W 9–3	6,555	20–3–2 (11–2–2)
January 25	6:00 pm	#4 Minnesota	#2	Munn Ice Arena • East Lansing, Michigan	BTN	Augustine	T 3–3 ^{SOW}	6,555	20–3–3 (11–2–3)
January 30	8:00 pm	at #11 Ohio State	#2	Value City Arena • Columbus, Ohio	BTN	Augustine	L 2–4	5,339	20–4–3 (11–3–3)
January 31	7:00 pm	at #11 Ohio State	#2	Value City Arena • Columbus, Ohio	BTN+	Augustine	W 4–1	6,617	21–4–3 (12–3–3)
February 7	7:00 pm	#13 Michigan	#2	Munn Ice Arena • East Lansing, Michigan (Rivalry)	BTN+	Augustine	L 1–2	6,555	21–5–3 (12–4–3)
February 8	8:00 pm	vs. #13 Michigan	#2	Little Caesars Arena • Detroit, Michigan (Duel in the D)	BTN	Augustine	W 6–1	19,515	22–5–3 (13–4–3)
February 21	6:00 pm	#18 Penn State	#1	Munn Ice Arena • East Lansing, Michigan	BTN	Augustine	T 2–2 ^{SOL}	6,555	22–5–4 (13–4–4)
February 22	6:00 pm	#18 Penn State	#1	Munn Ice Arena • East Lansing, Michigan	BTN	Augustine	L 2–3	6,555	22–6–4 (13–5–4)
February 28	7:00 pm	at Notre Dame	#3	Compton Family Ice Arena • Notre Dame, Indiana	Peacock	Augustine	W 5–2	5,043	23–6–4 (14–5–4)
March 1	6:00 pm	at Notre Dame	#3	Compton Family Ice Arena • Notre Dame, Indiana	Peacock	Augustine	W 5–2	5,132	24–6–4 (15–5–4)
Big Ten Tournament
March 15	6:00 pm	Notre Dame	#2	Munn Ice Arena • East Lansing, Michigan (Semifinals)	BTN	Augustine	W 1–0	6,555	25–6–4
March 22	7:30 pm	#9 Ohio State	#1	Munn Ice Arena • East Lansing, Michigan (Championship)	BTN	Augustine	W 4–3 ^{2OT}	6,555	26–6–4
NCAA Tournament
March 27	5:30 pm	vs. #16 Cornell*	#1	Huntington Center • Toledo, Ohio (Regional Semifinal)	ESPN+	Augustine	L 3–4	6,937	26–7–4
*Non-conference game. ^{#}Rankings from USCHO.com Poll. All times are in Eastern Time. Source:

== Statistics ==
=== Scoring ===
Name	Position	Games	Goals	Assists	Points	PIM
Isaac Howard	LW	37	26	26	52	10
Karsen Dorwart	C/LW	35	13	18	31	12
Charlie Stramel	C/RW	37	9	18	27	26
Matt Basgall	D	37	6	20	26	8
Daniel Russell	C	37	13	12	25	27
Joey Larson	LW/RW	37	10	14	24	22
Maxim Štrbák	D	33	3	16	19	16
Nicklas Andrews	D	37	2	16	18	14
Tanner Kelly	F	37	8	9	17	20
Tiernan Shoudy	F	37	8	9	17	24
Shane Vansaghi	RW	37	6	10	16	30
David Gucciardi	D	37	6	10	16	42
Gavin O'Connell	RW	28	6	7	13	10
Red Savage	C	20	5	6	11	6
Tommi Männistö	RW	37	3	8	11	6
Mikey DeAngelo	C	33	3	6	9	19
Vladislav Lukashevich	D	29	1	6	7	4
Patrick Geary	D	37	1	6	7	43
Austin Oravetz	D	13	0	3	3	15
Owen West	D	34	0	3	3	20
Griffin Jurecki	LW	26	0	2	2	0
Nathan Mackie	F	9	0	1	1	6
Trey Augustine	G	30	0	3	3	0
Luca Di Pasquo	G	7	0	0	0	0
Total			129	228	357	382

=== Goaltending ===
Name	Games	Minutes	Wins	Losses	Ties	Goals against	Saves	Shut outs	SV %	GAA
Luca Di Pasquo	8	424:20	7	0	0	12	167	2	.933	1.70
Trey Augustine	30	1850:27	19	7	4	64	778	3	.924	2.08
Empty Net	-	9:59	-	-	-	1	-	-	-	-
Total	37	2284:46	26	7	4	77	945	5	.924	2.02

== Rankings ==
Poll	Week																											
Poll	Pre	1	2	3	4	5	6	7	8	9	10	11	12	13	14	15	16	17	18	19	20	21	22	23	24	25	26	27 (Final)
USCHO.com	4	4	4	4	3	4	4	2	1 (38)	1 (43)	3 (4)	1 (31)	–	1 (41)	1 (43)	1 (48)	2 (13)	2 (7)	2 (2)	2	1 (23)	3	2 (6)	2 (2)	1 (33)	1 (32)	–	6
USA Hockey	4	4	4	4	3	3т	3т	2	1 (24)	1 (31)	2 (2)	1 (21)	–	1 (28)	1 (27)	1 (33)	2 (10)	2 (7)	2 (1)	2	1 (20)	3	2	2	1 (23)	1 (20)	6 (1)	6

Note: USCHO did not release a poll in week 12 or 26.
Note: USA Hockey did not release a poll in week 12.

== Awards and honors ==
Player	Award	Ref
Isaac Howard	Hobey Baker Award	
Trey Augustine	AHCA All-American West First Team	
Isaac Howard	AHCA All-American West First Team	
Matt Basgall	AHCA All-American West Second Team	
Isaac Howard	Big Ten Player of the Year	
Isaac Howard	Big Ten Scoring Champion	
Trey Augustine	Big Ten Goaltender of the Year	
Trey Augustine	All-Big Ten First Team	
Matt Basgall	All-Big Ten First Team	
Isaac Howard	All-Big Ten First Team	
Trey Augustine	Big Ten All-Tournament Team	
Matt Basgall	Big Ten All-Tournament Team	
Isaac Howard	Big Ten All-Tournament Team	

== 2025 NHL entry draft ==
Round	Pick	Player	NHL team
1	6	Porter Martone ^{†}	Philadelphia Flyers
1	26	Ryker Lee ^{†}	Nashville Predators
1	29	Mason West ^{†}	Chicago Blackhawks
2	45	Eric Nilson ^{†}	Anaheim Ducks
2	48	Shane Vansaghi	Philadelphia Flyers
3	91	Brady Peddle ^{†}	Pittsburgh Penguins
5	145	Alexis Cournoyer ^{†}	Montreal Canadiens

† incoming freshman
