= 2024–25 Notre Dame Fighting Irish men's ice hockey season =

- Conference: 7th Big Ten
- Home ice: Compton Family Ice Arena

Rankings
- USCHO: NR
- USA Hockey: NR

Record
- Overall: 12–25–1
- Conference: 4–19–1
- Home: 5–12–0
- Road: 6–12–0
- Neutral: 1–1–1

Coaches and captains
- Head coach: Jeff Jackson
- Assistant coaches: Paul Pooley; Andy Slaggert; Brock Sheahan
- Captain(s): Tyler Carpenter; Justin Janicke; Ian Murphy; Grant Silianoff

The 2024–25 Notre Dame Fighting Irish men's ice hockey season was the 65th season of play for the program and 8th in the Big Ten Conference. The Fighting Irish represented the University of Notre Dame in the 2024–25 NCAA Division I men's ice hockey season, played their home games at Compton Family Ice Arena and were coached by Jeff Jackson in his 20th and final season with the team.

== Season ==
Entering the season, Notre Dame had rather unwelcome news that this would be the final season for Jeff Jackson as coach. While he was not announcing his retirement from the game, he decided that it was time for a change. Wanting to rally around their departing coach, the Irish lost only one player outside of graduation and brought in a top goaltending prospect to replace their All-American, Ryan Bischel.

Notre Dame began the season well, posing a solid record in October. While the Irish looked like they were living up to their preseason ranking, cracks were already beginning to show. While Nicholas Kempf was ND's goalie of the future, the team wasn't ready to throw him to the wolves. Owen Say, a Mercyhurst transfer, was brought in to help shoulder the load and the two alternated starts from the beginning of the year. While this reduction in workload appeared to be succeeding in the first month, November came with a cold wind that harried the club. Notre Dame's defense began its impersonation of a colander in earnest, allowing both netminders to get bombarded by shots. The situation became so bad for Kempf that he saw his starts reduced, however, that only forced Say into the firing line more often and both he and the team suffered as a result. Say performed well in goal posting a .920 save percentage, but the Irish allowed the second most shots per game in the nation (35.2) and the junior netminder was unable to save the day all by his lonesome. The offense was able to put up respectable numbers but could rarely overcome the team's porous defense.

After winning their conference opener, the Irish didn't win another Big Ten matchup until mid-January. The scoring did pick up enough for the team to earn a few wins in the latter part of the season but those efforts were fleeting and the Irish ended the regular season well established in last place. The team opened their postseason run against one of the favorites to compete for a national title, Minnesota. Despite being the heavy underdog, ND opened with the first two goals of the game. The Gophers were able to respond but Say turned aside many chances to retain the lead for the Irish. After the surprising win in the first match, Minnesota upped their game in round two, bombarding Say with even more attempts. Used to high-volume shots by then, Say was able to hold off the Gophers for more than half the game and the two entered the third ties at 1-all. Unfortunately, Say could not withstand the Gophers' attack forever and Minnesota racked up three goals in the final period to even the series. The rubber match was much the same as the second, with Minnesota dumping an avalanche of rubber onto the Notre Dame goaltender, however, this time he did not break. Say stopped 38 of 39 shots while the offense stepped up to take advantage of a vulnerable Gopher netminder by scoring 3 goals on just 20 shots. An empty-net marker at the end sealed the game and sent Notre Dame to the semifinals.

In their match with Michigan State, Owen Say had possible the best performance of his career. He stopped 45 of 46 shots, with the only blemish coming on the fourth MSU power play of the game. Unfortunately, he received no help from the rest of his team. While the defense played its typical swiss-cheese style, the offense was also inept in that it failed to score a single goal. The loss brought Notre Dame's season to a close and ended the most successful coaching era in program history.

== Departures ==
Player	Position	Nationality	Cause
Drew Bavaro	Defenseman	United States	Graduation (signed with Boston Bruins)
Ryan Bischel	Goaltender	United States	Graduation (signed with Providence Bruins)
Brady Bjork	Forward	United States	Graduation (retired)
Jake Boltmann	Defenseman	United States	Graduate transfer to Northeastern
Josh Graziano	Goaltender	United States	Graduate transfer to Boston University
Trevor Janicke	Forward	United States	Graduation (signed with Calgary Wranglers)
Patrick Moynihan	Forward	United States	Graduation (signed with Chicago Wolves)
Brayden Napoli	Goaltender	United States	Graduation (retired)
Ryan Siedem	Defenseman	United States	Graduation (signed with Hartford Wolf Pack)
Landon Slaggert	Forward	United States	Graduation (signed with Chicago Blackhawks)
Fin Williams	Forward	Canada	Transferred to Minnesota State

== Recruiting ==
Player	Position	Nationality	Age	Notes
Blake Biondi	Forward	United States	22	Hermantown, MN; graduate transfer from Minnesota Duluth; selected 109th overall in 2020
Jimmy Jurcev	Defenseman	United States	21	Palos Heights, IL
Nicholas Kempf	Goaltender	United States	18	Morton Grove, IL; selected 114th overall in 2024
Jaedon Kerr	Defenseman	United States	21	Elk River, MN
Axel Kumlin	Defenseman	Sweden	22	Stockholm, SWE; transfer from Miami
Jack Larrigan	Forward	United States	20	St. Louis, MO
Ian Murphy	Forward	United States	25	Scituate, MA; graduate transfer from Princeton
Luke Robinson	Defenseman	United States	24	Nashville, TN; graduate transfer from Air Force
Owen Say	Goaltender	Canada	23	London, ON; transfer from Mercyhurst
Michael Schermerhorn	Forward	United States	20	Traverse City, MI

== Roster ==
As of September 3, 2024.

No.	Nat.	Player	Class	Pos	Height	Weight	DoB	Hometown	Previous team	NHL rights
2	(United States)	Jimmy Jurcev	Freshman	D	6' 5" (1.96 m)	200 lb (91 kg)	2003-05-05	Palos Heights, Illinois	Lincoln Stars (USHL)	—
3	(United States)	Hunter Weiss	Senior	D	6' 3" (1.91 m)	215 lb (98 kg)	2001-03-29	Lake Forest, Illinois	Minnesota Magicians (NAHL)	—
4	(Canada)	Michael Mastrodomenico	Junior	D	6' 0" (1.83 m)	210 lb (95 kg)	2004-04-19	Kirkland, Quebec	Lincoln Stars (USHL)	—
5	(Sweden)	Axel Kumlin	Junior	D	6' 1" (1.85 m)	196 lb (89 kg)	2002-02-23	Stockholm, Sweden	Miami (NCHC)	—
8	(United States)	Justin Janicke (C)	Senior	F	5' 11" (1.8 m)	192 lb (87 kg)	2003-06-30	Maple Grove, Minnesota	USNTDP (USHL)	SEA, 195th overall 2021
9	(United States)	Grant Silianoff (C)	Graduate	F	5' 11" (1.8 m)	180 lb (82 kg)	2001-01-04	Edina, Minnesota	Cedar Rapids RoughRiders (USHL)	—
10	(United States)	Hunter Strand	Senior	F	5' 11" (1.8 m)	190 lb (86 kg)	2002-11-13	Anchorage, Alaska	Tri-City Storm (USHL)	—
11	(United States)	Danny Nelson	Sophomore	F	6' 2" (1.88 m)	215 lb (98 kg)	2005-08-03	Maple Grove, Minnesota	USNTDP (USHL)	NYI, 49th overall 2023
12	(United States)	Henry Nelson	Sophomore	D	6' 1" (1.85 m)	197 lb (89 kg)	2003-03-25	Maple Grove, Minnesota	Lincoln Stars (USHL)	—
13	(United States)	Brennan Ali	Sophomore	F	6' 0" (1.83 m)	194 lb (88 kg)	2004-02-09	Glencoe, Illinois	Lincoln Stars (USHL)	DET, 212th overall 2023
14	(United States)	Maddox Fleming	Sophomore	F	5' 11" (1.8 m)	198 lb (90 kg)	2004-02-13	Rochester, Minnesota	Sioux Falls Stampede (USHL)	—
15	(Canada)	Jayden Davis	Sophomore	F	5' 10" (1.78 m)	190 lb (86 kg)	2003-03-02	Calgary, Alberta	Green Bay Gamblers (USHL)	—
16	(United States)	Paul Fischer	Sophomore	D	6' 0" (1.83 m)	203 lb (92 kg)	2005-01-30	River Forest, Illinois	USNTDP (USHL)	EDM, 138th overall 2023
17	(Canada)	Ryan Helliwell	Senior	D	6' 0" (1.83 m)	198 lb (90 kg)	2002-08-05	Burnaby, British Columbia	Trail Smoke Eaters (BCHL)	—
18	(United States)	Jack Larrigan	Freshman	F	5' 10" (1.78 m)	178 lb (81 kg)	2004-04-09	St. Louis, Missouri	Cedar Rapids RoughRiders (USHL)	—
20	(Canada)	Niko Jovanovic	Junior	F	6' 3" (1.91 m)	223 lb (101 kg)	2002-06-13	West Vancouver, British Columbia	Spruce Grove Saints (AJHL)	—
21	(United States)	Jaedon Kerr	Freshman	D	6' 4" (1.93 m)	218 lb (99 kg)	2003-09-13	Elk River, Minnesota	Waterloo Black Hawks (USHL)	—
22	(United States)	Cole Knuble	Sophomore	F	5' 10" (1.78 m)	191 lb (87 kg)	2004-07-01	Grand Rapids, Michigan	Fargo Force (USHL)	PHI, 103rd overall 2023
23	(United States)	Michael Schermerhorn	Freshman	F	6' 0" (1.83 m)	216 lb (98 kg)	2003-10-14	Traverse City, Michigan	New Mexico Ice Wolves (NAHL)	—
24	(United States)	Ian Murphy (C)	Graduate	F	5' 11" (1.8 m)	193 lb (88 kg)	1999-04-06	Scituate, Massachusetts	Princeton (ECAC)	—
25	(United States)	Carter Slaggert	Sophomore	F	5' 9" (1.75 m)	175 lb (79 kg)	2005-03-04	South Bend, Indiana	USNTDP (USHL)	—
26	(United States)	Zach Plucinski	Graduate	D	6' 1" (1.85 m)	202 lb (92 kg)	2000-07-26	Eagle River, Alaska	Omaha Lancers (USHL)	—
27	(United States)	Blake Biondi	Graduate	F	6' 1" (1.85 m)	215 lb (98 kg)	2002-04-24	Hermantown, Minnesota	Minnesota Duluth (NCHC)	MTL, 109th overall 2020
28	(United States)	Tyler Carpenter (C)	Senior	F	5' 11" (1.8 m)	190 lb (86 kg)	2000-08-27	Palatine, Illinois	Omaha Lancers (USHL)	—
29	(United States)	Jack Williams	Junior	G	6' 3" (1.91 m)	190 lb (86 kg)	2001-06-21	St. Louis, Missouri	Waterloo Black Hawks (USHL)	—
30	(Canada)	Owen Say	Junior	G	6' 2" (1.88 m)	181 lb (82 kg)	2001-06-05	London, Ontario	Mercyhurst (AHA)	—
31	(United States)	Nicholas Kempf	Freshman	G	6' 2" (1.88 m)	192 lb (87 kg)	2006-03-01	Morton Grove, Illinois	USNTDP (USHL)	WSH, 114th overall 2024
32	(United States)	Luke Robinson	Graduate	D	6' 3" (1.91 m)	205 lb (93 kg)	2000-02-16	Nashville, Tennessee	Air Force (AHA)	—
35	(United States)	James Mooney	Senior	G	5' 9" (1.75 m)	160 lb (73 kg)		Purchase, New York	Rye Country Day (USHS–NY)	—

== Standings ==
2024–25 Big Ten ice hockey Standings
	Conference record										Overall record					
	GP	W	L	T	OTW	OTL	3/SW	PTS	GF	GA	GP	W	L	T	GF	GA
#6 Michigan State †*	24	15	5	4	2	1	2	50	92	60	37	26	7	4	129	77
#9 Minnesota †	24	15	6	3	1	3	0	50	87	62	40	25	11	4	154	101
#11 Ohio State	24	14	9	1	3	2	0	42	72	62	40	24	14	2	127	106
#17 Michigan	24	12	10	2	5	1	2	36	76	83	36	18	15	3	112	118
#5 Penn State	24	9	11	4	2	1	3	33	78	88	40	22	14	4	139	120
Wisconsin	24	7	16	1	1	6	0	27	64	77	37	13	21	3	108	110
Notre Dame	24	4	19	1	2	2	1	14	60	97	38	12	25	1	102	127
Championship: March 22, 2025 † indicates conference regular season champion * indicates conference tournament champion Rankings: USCHO.com Top 20 Poll

== Schedule and results ==
Date	Time	Opponent^{#}	Rank^{#}	Site	TV	Decision	Result	Attendance	Record
Exhibition
October 4	7:00 pm	USNTDP*	#19	Compton Family Ice Arena • Notre Dame, Indiana (Exhibition)	Peacock	Say	W 5–2	5,054	
Regular season
October 11	7:00 pm	at St. Lawrence*	#20	Appleton Arena • Canton, New York	ESPN+	Say	W 4–1	1,510	1–0–0
October 12	7:00 pm	at Clarkson*	#20	Cheel Arena • Potsdam, New York	ESPN+	Kempf	W 5–2	3,110	2–0–0
October 18	7:00 pm	Alaska*	#18	Compton Family Ice Arena • Notre Dame, Indiana	Peacock	Say	W 4–1	4,866	3–0–0
October 19	6:00 pm	Alaska*	#18	Compton Family Ice Arena • Notre Dame, Indiana	Peacock	Kempf	L 0–1	4,396	3–1–0
October 25	7:00 pm	Long Island*	#17	Compton Family Ice Arena • Notre Dame, Indiana	Peacock	Say	W 4–1	4,194	4–1–0
October 26	6:00 pm	Long Island*	#17	Compton Family Ice Arena • Notre Dame, Indiana	Peacock	Kempf	L 2–5	4,125	4–2–0
November 1	7:00 pm	Wisconsin	#19	Compton Family Ice Arena • Notre Dame, Indiana	Peacock	Say	W 3–2 ^{OT}	4,755	5–2–0 (1–0–0)
November 2	6:00 pm	Wisconsin	#19	Compton Family Ice Arena • Notre Dame, Indiana	Peacock	Say	L 1–2	4,826	5–3–0 (1–1–0)
November 8	6:00 pm	at #7 Michigan	#20	Yost Ice Arena • Ann Arbor, Michigan (Rivalry)		Say	L 1–2 ^{OT}	5,800	5–4–0 (1–2–0)
November 9	7:00 pm	at #7 Michigan	#20	Yost Ice Arena • Ann Arbor, Michigan (Rivalry)		Say	L 2–4	5,800	5–5–0 (1–3–0)
November 15	7:00 pm	at #4 Michigan State		Munn Ice Arena • East Lansing, Michigan	BTN+	Say	L 3–8	6,555	5–6–0 (1–4–0)
November 16	8:00 pm	at #4 Michigan State		Munn Ice Arena • East Lansing, Michigan	BTN+	Kempf	L 3–4	6,555	5–7–0 (1–5–0)
November 22	7:00 pm	#4 Minnesota		Compton Family Ice Arena • Notre Dame, Indiana	Peacock	Say	L 3–6	5,249	5–8–0 (1–6–0)
November 23	6:00 pm	#4 Minnesota		Compton Family Ice Arena • Notre Dame, Indiana	Peacock	Kempf	L 3–5	5,011	5–9–0 (1–7–0)
Friendship Four
November 29	2:00 pm	vs. Harvard*		SSE Arena Belfast • Belfast, Northern Ireland (Friendship Four Semifinal)	NESN	Say	W 5–2	9,000	6–9–0
November 30	2:00 pm	vs. #13 Boston University*		SSE Arena Belfast • Belfast, Northern Ireland (Friendship Four Championship)	NESN	Say	L 3–4	9,000	6–10–0
Regular season
December 13	7:00 pm	at #15 Ohio State		Value City Arena • Columbus, Ohio		Kempf	L 1–2 ^{OT}	4,009	6–11–0 (1–8–0)
December 14	7:00 pm	at #15 Ohio State		Value City Arena • Columbus, Ohio	BTN	Say	L 1–3	4,363	6–12–0 (1–9–0)
January 3	8:30 pm	vs. Penn State		Wrigley Field • Chicago, Illinois (Frozen Confines)	BTN	Kempf	T 3–3 ^{SOW}	25,709	6–12–1 (1–9–1)
January 5	5:00 pm	Penn State		Compton Family Ice Arena • Notre Dame, Indiana	Peacock	Say	L 0–3	5,027	6–13–1 (1–10–1)
January 10	7:00 pm	#9 Michigan		Compton Family Ice Arena • Notre Dame, Indiana (Rivlary)	Peacock	Kempf	L 3–5	4,683	6–14–1 (1–11–1)
January 11	6:00 pm	#9 Michigan		Compton Family Ice Arena • Notre Dame, Indiana (Rivalry)	Peacock	Say	W 7–4	4,969	7–14–1 (2–11–1)
January 17	8:00 pm	at #3 Minnesota		3M Arena at Mariucci • Minneapolis, Minnesota	Fox 9+	Kempf	L 2–5	4,969	7–15–1 (2–12–1)
January 18	6:00 pm	at #3 Minnesota		3M Arena at Mariucci • Minneapolis, Minnesota	Fox 9+	Say	W 4–3 ^{OT}	10,346	8–15–1 (3–12–1)
January 24	7:00 pm	Lindenwood*		Compton Family Ice Arena • Notre Dame, Indiana	Peacock	Say	L 2–3	5,169	8–16–1
January 25	6:00 pm	Lindenwood*		Compton Family Ice Arena • Notre Dame, Indiana	Peacock	Kempf	W 4–2	5,125	9–16–1
February 7	7:00 pm	#9 Ohio State		Compton Family Ice Arena • Notre Dame, Indiana	Peacock	Say	L 1–5	5,165	9–17–1 (3–13–1)
February 8	6:00 pm	#9 Ohio State		Compton Family Ice Arena • Notre Dame, Indiana	Peacock	Kempf	L 1–5	5,212	9–18–1 (3–14–1)
February 14	7:00 pm	at #18 Penn State		Pegula Ice Arena • University Park, Pennsylvania		Say	L 3–5	6,606	9–19–1 (3–15–1)
February 15	5:00 pm	at #18 Penn State		Pegula Ice Arena • University Park, Pennsylvania		Say	L 2–3	6,589	9–20–1 (3–16–1)
February 21	6:30 pm	at Wisconsin		Kohl Center • Madison, Wisconsin		Kempf	L 3–7	12,463	9–21–1 (3–17–1)
February 22	6:30 pm	at Wisconsin		Kohl Center • Madison, Wisconsin		Say	W 6–1	12,959	10–21–1 (4–17–1)
February 28	7:00 pm	#3 Michigan State		Compton Family Ice Arena • Notre Dame, Indiana	Peacock	Say	L 2–5	5,043	10–22–1 (4–18–1)
March 1	6:00 pm	#3 Michigan State		Compton Family Ice Arena • Notre Dame, Indiana	Peacock	Kempf	L 2–5	5,132	10–23–1 (4–19–1)
Big Ten Tournament
March 7	8:00 pm	at #3 Minnesota		3M Arena at Mariucci • Minneapolis, Minnesota (Quarterfinals)	B1G+	Say	W 3–2	5,551	11–23–1
March 8	8:00 pm	at #3 Minnesota		3M Arena at Mariucci • Minneapolis, Minnesota (Quarterfinals)	B1G+	Say	L 2–4	6,331	11–24–1
March 9	7:00 pm	at #3 Minnesota		3M Arena at Mariucci • Minneapolis, Minnesota (Quarterfinals)	B1G+	Say	W 4–1	4,642	12–24–1
March 15	6:00 pm	at #2 Michigan State		Munn Ice Arena • East Lansing, Michigan (Semifinals)	BTN	Say	L 0–1	6,555	12–25–1
*Non-conference game. ^{#}Rankings from USCHO.com Poll. All times are in Eastern Time. Source:

== Scoring statistics ==
Name	Position	Games	Goals	Assists	Points	PIM
Cole Knuble	C/RW	34	12	27	39	12
Justin Janicke	C/LW	38	15	19	34	29
Blake Biondi	C	38	12	15	27	14
Danny Nelson	C/LW	36	13	13	26	35
Axel Kumlin	D	38	6	15	21	12
Paul Fischer	D	36	2	19	21	16
Brennan Ali	C/LW	38	7	12	19	18
Hunter Strand	C	38	8	8	16	20
Mike Mastrodomenico	D	30	4	11	15	18
Ian Murphy	C/RW	38	4	7	11	24
Carter Slaggert	LW/RW	38	4	6	10	16
Grant Silianoff	RW	38	5	3	8	18
Henry Nelson	D	30	3	5	8	32
Ryan Helliwell	D	37	1	6	7	39
Jack Larrigan	LW/RW	29	1	5	6	4
Jaedon Kerr	D	22	1	3	4	6
Jimmy Jurcev	D	31	1	3	4	10
Jayden Davis	C/LW	22	1	2	3	8
Maddox Fleming	LW/RW	22	0	3	3	10
Zachary Plucinski	D	34	0	3	3	18
Tyler Carpenter	F	38	1	1	2	0
Niko Jovanovic	C/LW	12	1	0	1	0
Michael Schermerhorn	C/LW	1	0	0	0	0
Jack Williams	G	1	0	0	0	0
Hunter Weiss	D	3	0	0	0	0
Nicholas Kempf	G	13	0	0	0	0
Owen Say	G	27	0	0	0	0
Bench	-	-	-	-	-	18
Total			101	174	275	503

== Goaltending statistics ==
Name	Games	Minutes	Wins	Losses	Ties	Goals against	Saves	Shut outs	SV %	GAA
Owen Say	27	1530:57	10	15	0	72	829	0	.920	2.82
Nicholas Kempf	13	722:03	2	10	1	45	384	0	.895	3.74
Jack Williams	1	10:26	0	0	0	1	8	0	.889	5.75
Empty Net	-	31:26	-	-	-	9	-	-	-	-
Total	38	2294:52	12	25	1	127	1221	0	.906	3.32

== Rankings ==
Poll	Week																											
Poll	Pre	1	2	3	4	5	6	7	8	9	10	11	12	13	14	15	16	17	18	19	20	21	22	23	24	25	26	27 (Final)
USCHO.com	19	20	18	17	19	20	RV	RV	RV	RV	RV	NR	–	NR	NR	NR	NR	NR	NR	NR	NR	NR	NR	NR	NR	NR	–	NR
USA Hockey	19	18	18	17т	20	RV	RV	RV	NR	NR	NR	NR	–	NR	NR	NR	NR	NR	NR	NR	NR	NR	NR	NR	NR	NR	NR	NR

Note: USCHO did not release a poll in week 12 or 26.
Note: USA Hockey did not release a poll in week 12.

== Awards and honors ==
Player	Award	Ref
Cole Knuble	Big Ten Second Team	

== 2025 NHL entry draft ==
Round	Pick	Player	NHL team
5	137	William Belle ^{†}	Toronto Maple Leafs

† incoming freshman
