= 2024–25 Wisconsin Badgers men's ice hockey season =

American college ice hockey season

Holiday Face–Off, Champion
- Conference: 6th Big Ten
- Home ice: Kohl Center

Rankings
- USCHO: NR
- USA Today: NR

Record
- Overall: 13–21–3
- Conference: 7–16–1
- Home: 6–10–3
- Road: 5–10–0
- Neutral: 2–1–0

Coaches and captains
- Head coach: Mike Hastings
- Assistant coaches: Todd Knott; Nick Oliver; Kevin Murdock
- Captain: Owen Lindmark
- Alternate captain(s): Anthony Kehrer; Daniel Laatsch

The 2024–25 Wisconsin Badgers men's ice hockey season was the 76th season of play for the program and 24th in the Big Ten. The Badgers represented the University of Wisconsin–Madison in the 2024–25 NCAA Division I men's ice hockey season, played their home games at Kohl Center and were coached by Mike Hastings in his 2nd season.

== Previous season ==
After making a splash in Mike Hastings' first year as coach, Wisconsin entered the season with high expectations and a top-10 preseason ranking. While the Badgers did see a significant portion of their roster change, the club was largely confident in its personnel. Goaltending was uncertain as Wisconsin would have to rely on an untested duo of William Gramme and Tommy Scarfone. Gramme had just 4 games to his credit while Scarfone, who had made a name for himself in Atlantic Hockey, had not yet faced a murderer's row of opponents that the Big Ten was likely to put in his path.

Wisconsin's season did not begin auspiciously as the club dropped its season-opener to lowly Lindenwood and didn't get much better for the next five weeks. The Badgers won just twice in their first 10 games and completely fell out of the polls. Thanks in part to a capable defense holding the opposition to a low number of shots, the netminding tandem performed well during this time. It turned out to be the offense that failed the Badgers. Wisconsin could only score more than 2 goals once, with the lack of firepower costing the team many winnable games. Scoring picked up in mid-November, and the Badgers could limp into the winter break with a subpar record. Fortunately for Wisconsin, they performed well in the Holiday Face–Off and could use a good mark in non-conference play to have a chance at earning an at-large position.

The second half of the season went largely like the first; Wisconsin had trouble finding its offensive game for long stretches, and Scarfone, who had taken over as the primary starter, was faced with the impossible task of holding opponents to one goal or fewer on most nights. As the losses stacked up, Wisconsin knew that their only hope of returning to the tournament lay in a conference championship.

The team began its postseason push against Ohio State and demonstrated how good they could be in the first game. Four goals from up and down the lineup allowed Scarfone to backstop the Badgers to a comfortable victory. The Badgers then built a 2-goal lead by the middle of the second game and looked like they were set to earn a trip to the semifinals. However, the Buckeyes increased their offensive pressure and shelled the UW cage. One got behind Scarfone, but resisted further attempts until the game's final few minutes. With their goaltender pulled, Ohio State tied the game with less than 90 seconds remaining and sent the match into overtime. The two sides exchanged changes in the fourth period, but OSU secured the winning goal and tied the series. Having lost a golden opportunity, Wisconsin struggled in the first part of the deciding game, managing just 15 shots through the first 40 minutes. Scarfone held the fort and allowed the team to enter the third with the score tied, but he got little help from his team. Having already killed off two Buckeye power plays, the Badgers took three minors in the first 10 minutes of the third. The first two went for naught but finally solved the Wisconsin penalty kill on their fifth man-advantage of the game. Ohio State handed the Badgers a power play a minute after taking the lead; however, Wisconsin couldn't capitalize. Instead, OSU got a lucky bounce and rushed up the ice. Just after the penalty expired, they extended their lead to 2 off a rebound and left Wisconsin stunned. After killing off a sixth Ohio State power play, the Badgers pulled Scarfone and were able to cut the lead back to 1, but they could not find the tying goal, and their season came to a close.

A few weeks later, Wisconsin got revenge when its women's team defeated Ohio State to win the National Championship.

== Departures ==
Player	Position	Nationality	Cause
Carson Bantle	Forward	United States	Graduation (signed with Grand Rapids Griffins)
Brady Cleveland	Defenseman	United States	Transferred to Colorado College
Mathieu De St. Phalle	Forward	United States	Graduation (signed with Wilkes-Barre/Scranton Penguins)
Ben Garrity	Goaltender	United States	Graduation (retired)
Tyson Jugnauth	Defenseman	Canada	Left program (signed with Portland Winterhawks)
Luke LaMaster	Defenseman	United States	Graduate Transfer to Alaska
Cruz Lucius	Forward	United States	Transferred to Arizona State
Kyle McClellan	Goaltender	United States	Graduation (signed with Iowa Wild)
David Silye	Forward	Canada	Graduation (signed with Calgary Wranglers)
Charlie Stramel	Forward	United States	Transferred to Michigan State
Sam Strange	Forward	United States	Transferred to Omaha
Mike Vorlicky	Defenseman	Canada	Graduation (signed with Idaho Steelheads)
William Whitelaw	Forward	United States	Transferred to Michigan

== Recruiting ==
Player	Position	Nationality	Age	Notes
Ryan Botterill	Forward	Canada	21	Portage la Prairie, MB
Luke Buss	Forward	United States	21	Columbus, OH
Anton Castro	Goaltender	United States	21	Mendota Heights, MN
Logan Hensler	Defenseman	United States	17	Woodbury, MN
Kyle Kukkonen	Forward	United States	21	Maple Grove, MN; transfer from Michigan Tech
Cody Laskosky	Forward	Canada	25	Camrose, AB; transfer from RIT
Gavin Morrissey	Forward	United States	21	Rochester Hills, MI
Ryland Mosley	Forward	Canada	24	Arnprior, ON; transfer from Michigan Tech
Weston Knox	Defenseman	United States	20	Andover, MN
Jack Phelan	Defenseman	United States	20	Hinsdale, IL; selected 137th overall in 2023
Adam Pietila	Forward	United States	21	Howell, MI; transfer from Northern Michigan
Tommy Scarfone	Goaltender	Canada	23	Montreal, QC; transfer from RIT

== Roster ==
As of September 23, 2024.

No.	Nat.	Player	Class	Pos	Height	Weight	DoB	Hometown	Previous team	NHL rights
2	(United States)	Daniel Laatsch (A)	Senior	D	6' 5" (1.96 m)	190 lb (86 kg)	2002-02-13	Altoona, Wisconsin	Sioux City Musketeers (USHL)	PIT, 215th overall 2021
4	(United States)	Ben Dexheimer	Junior	D	5' 10" (1.78 m)	172 lb (78 kg)	2002-06-21	Edina, Minnesota	Madison Capitols (USHL)	—
5	(United States)	Zach Schulz	Sophomore	D	6' 1" (1.85 m)	185 lb (84 kg)	2005-06-14	South Lyon, Michigan	USNTDP (USHL)	NYI, 177th overall 2023
6	(United States)	Logan Hensler	Freshman	D	6' 2" (1.88 m)	196 lb (89 kg)	2006-10-14	Woodbury, Minnesota	USNTDP (USHL)	—
7	(United States)	Gavin Morrissey	Freshman	F	5' 11" (1.8 m)	181 lb (82 kg)	2003-02-16	Rochester Hills, Michigan	Fargo Force (USHL)	—
8	(United States)	Jack Phelan	Freshman	F	6' 3" (1.91 m)	185 lb (84 kg)	2004-05-28	Hinsdale, Illinois	Sioux Falls Stampede (USHL)	DET, 137th overall 2023
9	(United States)	Kyle Kukkonen	Junior	F	5' 10" (1.78 m)	174 lb (79 kg)	2002-11-13	Maple Grove, Minnesota	Michigan Tech (CCHA)	ANA, 162nd overall 2021
11	(Canada)	Simon Tassy	Junior	F	6' 2" (1.88 m)	190 lb (86 kg)	2001-03-21	Montreal, Quebec	Minnesota State (CCHA)	—
12	(Canada)	Ryland Mosley	Graduate	F	5' 11" (1.8 m)	190 lb (86 kg)	2000-02-15	Arnprior, Ontario	Michigan Tech (CCHA)	—
13	(Canada)	Christian Fitzgerald	Junior	F	6' 0" (1.83 m)	185 lb (84 kg)	2002-05-31	Coquitlam, British Columbia	Minnesota State (CCHA)	—
14	(United States)	Joe Palodichuk	Sophomore	D	6' 0" (1.83 m)	171 lb (78 kg)	2003-02-26	Cottage Grove, Minnesota	Fargo Force (USHL)	—
15	(United States)	Luke Buss	Freshman	F	5' 10" (1.78 m)	174 lb (79 kg)	2003-02-14	Columbus, Ohio	Nanaimo Clippers (BCHL)	—
16	(Canada)	Tyson Dyck	Junior	F	6' 0" (1.83 m)	170 lb (77 kg)	2004-02-06	Abbotsford, British Columbia	Massachusetts (HEA)	OTT, 206th overall 2022
17	(Canada)	Owen Mehlenbacher	Sophomore	F	6' 2" (1.88 m)	189 lb (86 kg)	2004-01-26	Fort Erie, Ontario	Fargo Force (USHL)	DET, 201st overall 2022
18	(United States)	Owen Lindmark (C)	Graduate	F	6' 0" (1.83 m)	195 lb (88 kg)	2001-05-17	Naperville, Illinois	USNTDP (USHL)	FLA, 137th overall 2019
19	(United States)	Quinn Finley	Sophomore	F	6' 0" (1.83 m)	179 lb (81 kg)	2004-08-08	Suamico, Wisconsin	Chicago Steel (USHL)	NYI, 78th overall 2022
20	(United States)	Weston Knox	Freshman	D	6' 0" (1.83 m)	181 lb (82 kg)	2004-04-06	Andover, Minnesota	Minot Minotauros (NAHL)	—
21	(Canada)	Ryan Botterill	Freshman	F	5' 11" (1.8 m)	176 lb (80 kg)	2003-07-23	Portage la Prairie, Manitoba	Youngstown (USHL)	—
22	(United States)	Jack Horbach	Junior	F	5' 11" (1.8 m)	176 lb (80 kg)	2002-05-04	Naperville, Illinois	Madison Capitols (USHL)	—
23	(United States)	Sawyer Scholl	Sophomore	F	6' 2" (1.88 m)	190 lb (86 kg)	2002-02-14	Medford, Wisconsin	Minnesota Wilderness (NAHL)	—
24	(Canada)	Anthony Kehrer (A)	Graduate	D	5' 11" (1.8 m)	210 lb (95 kg)	2002-03-04	Winnipeg, Manitoba	Sioux City Musketeers (USHL)	—
26	(Canada)	Cody Laskosky	Graduate	F	5' 11" (1.8 m)	191 lb (87 kg)	1999-06-21	Camrose, Alberta	RIT (AHA)	—
28	(United States)	Adam Pietila	Freshman	F	5' 11" (1.8 m)	191 lb (87 kg)	2003-01-14	Hartland, Michigan	Youngstown Phantoms (USHL)	—
30	(Canada)	Tommy Scarfone	Senior	G	6' 0" (1.83 m)	174 lb (79 kg)	1999-03-18	Montreal, Quebec	RIT (AHA)	—
33	(United States)	Anton Castro	Freshman	G	6' 1" (1.85 m)	181 lb (82 kg)	2003-01-23	Mendota Heights, Minnesota	Fargo Force (USHL)	—
34	(Sweden)	William Gramme	Sophomore	G	6' 4" (1.93 m)	201 lb (91 kg)	2002-05-24	Stockholm, Sweden	Lone Star Brahmas (NAHL)	—

== Standings ==
2024–25 Big Ten ice hockey Standings
	Conference record										Overall record					
	GP	W	L	T	OTW	OTL	3/SW	PTS	GF	GA	GP	W	L	T	GF	GA
#6 Michigan State †*	24	15	5	4	2	1	2	50	92	60	37	26	7	4	129	77
#9 Minnesota †	24	15	6	3	1	3	0	50	87	62	40	25	11	4	154	101
#11 Ohio State	24	14	9	1	3	2	0	42	72	62	40	24	14	2	127	106
#17 Michigan	24	12	10	2	5	1	2	36	76	83	36	18	15	3	112	118
#5 Penn State	24	9	11	4	2	1	3	33	78	88	40	22	14	4	139	120
Wisconsin	24	7	16	1	1	6	0	27	64	77	37	13	21	3	108	110
Notre Dame	24	4	19	1	2	2	1	14	60	97	38	12	25	1	102	127
Championship: March 22, 2025 † indicates conference regular season champion * indicates conference tournament champion Rankings: USCHO.com Top 20 Poll

== Schedule and results ==
Date	Time	Opponent^{#}	Rank^{#}	Site	TV	Decision	Result	Attendance	Record
Exhibition
October 5	6:07 pm	at #15 Omaha*	#10	Baxter Arena • Omaha, Nebraska (Exhibition)		Castro	W 3–2 ^{OT}	5,456	
Regular season
October 11	7:00 pm	Lindenwood*	#9	Kohl Center • Madison, Wisconsin	BTN+	Scarfone	L 2–4	7,537	0–1–0
October 12	6:00 pm	Lindenwood*	#9	Kohl Center • Madison, Wisconsin	BTN+	Gramme	W 3–2 ^{OT}	8,857	1–1–0
October 18	7:00 pm	Ohio State	#16	Kohl Center • Madison, Wisconsin		Scarfone	L 1–2 ^{OT}	9,332	1–2–0 (0–1–0)
October 19	6:00 pm	Ohio State	#16	Kohl Center • Madison, Wisconsin		Gramme	L 1–2	11,782	1–3–0 (0–2–0)
October 25	8:00 pm	at #1 Denver*	#20	Magness Arena • Denver, Colorado		Scarfone	L 2–4	6,935	1–4–0
October 26	7:00 pm	at #1 Denver*	#20	Magness Arena • Denver, Colorado		Gramme	L 1–6	6,560	1–5–0
November 1	6:00 pm	at #19 Notre Dame		Compton Family Ice Arena • Notre Dame, Indiana	Peacock	Scarfone	L 2–3 ^{OT}	4,755	1–6–0 (0–3–0)
November 2	5:00 pm	at #19 Notre Dame		Compton Family Ice Arena • Notre Dame, Indiana	Peacock	Scarfone	W 2–1	4,826	2–6–0 (1–3–0)
November 8	7:00 pm	#3 Minnesota		Kohl Center • Madison, Wisconsin (Rivalry)	BTN+	Gramme	L 2–3	10,157	2–7–0 (1–4–0)
November 9	6:00 pm	#3 Minnesota		Kohl Center • Madison, Wisconsin (Rivalry)	BTN+	Gramme	L 2–3	11,694	2–8–0 (1–5–0)
November 15	6:00 pm	at #18 Penn State		Pegula Ice Arena • University Park, Pennsylvania		Scarfone	W 5–4 ^{OT}	6,315	3–8–0 (2–5–0)
November 16	6:00 pm	at #18 Penn State		Pegula Ice Arena • University Park, Pennsylvania		Scarfone	W 6–3	6,348	4–8–0 (3–5–0)
November 29	7:00 pm	Alaska Anchorage*		Kohl Center • Madison, Wisconsin		Scarfone	W 7–1	8,904	5–8–0
November 30	8:00 pm	Alaska Anchorage*		Kohl Center • Madison, Wisconsin		Scarfone	T 1–1 ^{OT}	9,505	5–8–1
December 6	7:00 pm	#1 Michigan State		Kohl Center • Madison, Wisconsin		Scarfone	W 4–0	9,326	6–8–1 (4–5–0)
December 7	7:00 pm	#1 Michigan State		Kohl Center • Madison, Wisconsin	BTN	Scarfone	L 2–3 ^{OT}	11,063	6–9–1 (4–6–0)
December 13	5:00 pm	at #8 Michigan		Yost Ice Arena • Ann Arbor, Michigan	BTN	Scarfone	W 4–0	5,800	7–9–1 (5–6–0)
December 14	6:00 pm	at #8 Michigan		Yost Ice Arena • Ann Arbor, Michigan		Scarfone	L 2–3 ^{OT}	5,800	7–10–1 (5–7–0)
Holiday Face–Off
December 28	5:00 pm	vs. Ferris State*		Fiserv Forum • Milwaukee, Wisconsin (Holiday Face–Off Semifinal)		Scarfone	W 8–0	6,625	8–10–1
December 29	5:00 pm	vs. Connecticut*		Fiserv Forum • Milwaukee, Wisconsin (Holiday Face–Off Championship)		Scarfone	W 4–3	4,920	9–10–1
Regular season
January 2	5:30 pm	at #1 Michigan State		Munn Ice Arena • East Lansing, Michigan	BTN	Scarfone	L 3–4	6,555	9–11–1 (5–8–0)
January 4	8:00 pm	vs. #1 Michigan State		Wrigley Field • Chicago, Illinois (Frozen Confines)	BTN	Scarfone	L 3–4 ^{OT}	24,788	9–12–1 (5–9–0)
January 17	7:00 pm	Long Island*		Kohl Center • Madison, Wisconsin		Scarfone	W 6–3	8,354	10–12–1
January 18	6:00 pm	Long Island*		Kohl Center • Madison, Wisconsin		Scarfone	T 2–2 ^{OT}	9,699	10–12–2
January 24	7:00 pm	#10 Michigan		Kohl Center • Madison, Wisconsin		Gramme	W 5–4	11,093	11–12–2 (6–9–0)
January 25	7:30 pm	#10 Michigan		Kohl Center • Madison, Wisconsin	BTN	Scarfone	T 4–4 ^{SOL}	13,063	11–12–3 (6–9–1)
January 31	7:00 pm	at #4 Minnesota	#17	3M Arena at Mariucci • Minneapolis, Minnesota (Rivalry)		Scarfone	L 2–5	10,747	11–13–3 (6–10–1)
February 1	5:00 pm	at #4 Minnesota	#17	3M Arena at Mariucci • Minneapolis, Minnesota (Rivalry)		Scarfone	L 1–4	10,894	11–14–3 (6–11–1)
February 7	7:00 pm	Penn State	#19	Kohl Center • Madison, Wisconsin		Scarfone	L 0–2	10,071	11–15–3 (6–12–1)
February 8	6:00 pm	Penn State	#19	Kohl Center • Madison, Wisconsin		Scarfone	L 2–6	12,446	11–16–3 (6–13–1)
February 14	6:00 pm	at #8 Ohio State		Value City Arena • Columbus, Ohio		Castro	L 1–4	4,947	11–17–3 (6–14–1)
February 15	7:30 pm	at #8 Ohio State		Value City Arena • Columbus, Ohio		Scarfone	L 2–4	5,489	11–18–3 (6–15–1)
February 21	7:30 pm	Notre Dame		Kohl Center • Madison, Wisconsin	BTN	Scarfone	W 7–3	12,463	12–18–3 (7–15–1)
February 22	7:30 pm	Notre Dame		Kohl Center • Madison, Wisconsin	BTN	Scarfone	L 1–6	12,959	12–19–3 (7–16–1)
March 2	6:00 pm	USNTDP*		Kohl Center • Madison, Wisconsin (Exhibition)			L 5–6		
Big Ten Tournament
March 7	7:00 pm	at #9 Ohio State		Nationwide Arena • Columbus, Ohio (Quarterfinals Game 1)	B1G+	Scarfone	W 4–1	1,747	13–19–3
March 8	7:00 pm	at #9 Ohio State		Nationwide Arena • Columbus, Ohio (Quarterfinals Game 2)	B1G+	Scarfone	L 2–3 ^{OT}	2,181	13–20–3
March 9	7:00 pm	at #9 Ohio State		Nationwide Arena • Columbus, Ohio (Quarterfinals Game 3)	B1G+	Scarfone	L 2–3	962	13–21–3
*Non-conference game. ^{#}Rankings from USCHO.com Poll. All times are in Central Time. Source:

== Scoring statistics ==
Name	Position	Games	Goals	Assists	Points	PIM
Quinn Finley	LW	37	20	20	40	31
Ryland Mosley	LW/RW	37	18	19	37	21
Gavin Morrissey	F	37	9	23	32	14
Kyle Kukkonen	C/RW	37	10	9	19	22
Christian Fitzgerald	F	37	6	11	17	24
Ben Dexheimer	D	35	1	16	17	24
Tyson Dyck	C	37	3	10	13	10
Logan Hensler	D	32	2	10	12	27
Anthony Kehrer	D	35	1	11	12	14
Cody Laskosky	C	27	7	4	11	4
Simon Tassy	F	31	6	5	11	10
Zach Schulz	D	28	2	9	11	10
Owen Lindmark	C/RW	37	5	4	9	12
Sawyer Scholl	RW	34	3	6	9	26
Jack Horbach	C/RW	35	3	6	9	21
Ryan Botterill	F	31	4	3	7	2
Owen Mehlenbacher	C	25	4	2	6	2
Daniel Laatsch	D	22	2	3	5	2
Joe Palodichuk	D	25	1	3	4	8
Jack Phelan	D	36	0	4	4	14
Adam Pietila	F	31	1	2	3	57
Weston Knox	D	11	0	3	3	4
Tommy Scarfone	G	32	0	1	1	0
Anton Castro	G	1	0	0	0	0
Luke Buss	F	5	0	0	0	0
William Gramme	G	8	0	0	0	0
Bench	–	–	–	–	–	2
Total			108	184	292	339

== Goaltending statistics ==
Name	Games	Minutes	Wins	Losses	Ties	Goals against	Saves	Shut outs	SV %	GAA
Tommy Scarfone	32	1841:24	11	16	3	80	721	3	.900	2.61
William Gramme	8	353:19	2	4	0	19	137	0	.878	3.23
Anton Castro	1	42:10	0	1	0	3	11	0	.786	4.27
Empty Net	-	33:39	-	-	-	8	-	-	-	-
Total	37	2270:32	13	21	3	110	869	3	.888	2.91

== Rankings ==
Poll	Week																											
Poll	Pre	1	2	3	4	5	6	7	8	9	10	11	12	13	14	15	16	17	18	19	20	21	22	23	24	25	26	27 (Final)
USCHO.com	10	9	16	20	RV	RV	NR	RV	NR	NR	RV	RV	–	RV	RV	RV	RV	17	19	NR	RV	RV	RV	RV	RV	RV	–	NR
USA Today	10	9	15	RV	RV	RV	NR	RV	NR	NR	NR	NR	–	RV	NR	RV	RV	18	20	NR	RV	NR	NR	NR	NR	NR	NR	NR

Note: USCHO did not release a poll in week 12 or 26.
Note: USA Hockey did not release a poll in week 12.

== Awards and honors ==
Player	Award	Ref
Quinn Finley	All-Big Ten Second Team	
Logan Hensler	All-Big Ten Freshman Team	
Gavin Morrissey	All-Big Ten Freshman Team	

== 2025 NHL entry draft ==
Round	Pick	Player	NHL team
1	23	Logan Hensler	Ottawa Senators
4	109	Brent Solomon ^{†}	Detroit Red Wings
6	181	Bruno Idzan ^{†}	Ottawa Senators

† incoming freshman
