= 2024–25 Ohio State Buckeyes men's ice hockey season =

NCAA Tournament, Regional Semifinal
- Conference: 3rd Big Ten
- Home ice: Value City Arena

Rankings
- USCHO: #11
- USA Hockey: #12

Record
- Overall: 24–14–2
- Conference: 14–9–1
- Home: 16–4–1
- Road: 7–9–1
- Neutral: 1–1–0

Coaches and captains
- Head coach: Steve Rohlik
- Assistant coaches: J. B. Bittner; Paul Kirtland; Carter Krier
- Captain(s): Davis Burnside; Patrick Guzzo
- Alternate captain(s): Joe Dunlap; Aiden Hansen-Bukata

The 2024–25 Ohio State Buckeyes men's ice hockey season was the 62nd season for the program and 12th season in the Big Ten Conference. The Buckeyes represented the Ohio State University in the 2024–25 NCAA Division I men's ice hockey season, played their home games at Value City Arena and were coached by Steve Rohlik in his 12th season.

== Season ==
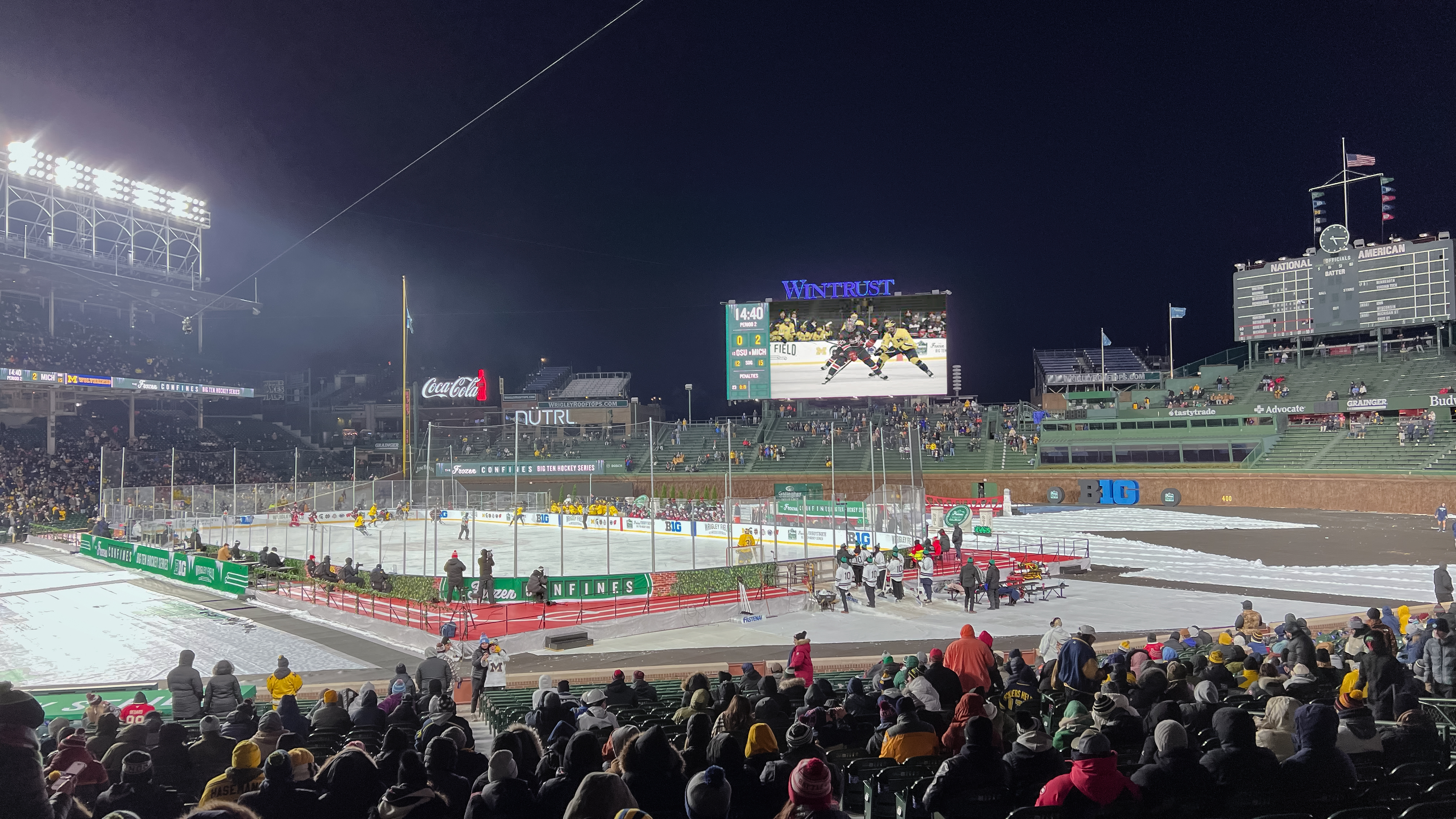
Frozen Confines game at Wrigley Field in Chicago against the Michigan Wolverines on January 3, 2025

Looking to recover from a forgettable '24, Ohio State began the season with a relatively stable lineup. While that was not necessarily a good thing from a team that finished last in the standings the year before, the Buckeyes were hoping to get a better performance from their returning players, particularly on the back end. To bolster their chances, the team brought in a pair of young NHL prospects as well as a trio of transfers. While the freshmen would not contribute much to the team this season, several other newcomers would provide a spark for Ohio State's offense.

The team began the year alternating between their two goaltenders, Kristoffer Eberly and Logan Terness. The results could not have been more encouraging as the Buckeyes averaged less than 2 goals against for the first month of the season. The solid goaltending allowed the offense time to find its footing and, by early November, Gunnarwolfe Fontaine was beginning to take over as the leader up front. The graduate was combined with Davis Burnside and fellow transfer Riley Thompson on the top line and the three provided a consistent attack that Ohio State was able to employ for the entire season. The Buckeyes went undefeated in their first eight games of the season and rocketed up the polls. Despite being swept by Michigan State in early November, Ohio State entered the Thanksgiving weekend in prime position for a return to the NCAA tournament.

After taking a week off, the team travelled to face Princeton and were stunned by the Tigers. Both the offense and defense failed, perhaps having yet to recover from their turkey dinner, and the Buckeyes limped home to nurse their wounds. In the aftermath of the losses, Eberly gained control of the net and led to the team to four consecutive wins to finish off the first half of the season. Even with the Princeton blemish, Ohio State was still 9 games above .500 by this point. While the team was not helped by the weakness of their non-conference opponents, the Buckeyes would have plenty of opportunity to demonstrate that they were worthy of a tournament bid when they ran through a gauntlet of Big Ten teams after new year's.

Ohio State kicked off the second half of its season by defeating Michigan at Wrigley Field. Unfortunately, for the entire month of January, Ohio State was unable to find any level of consistency and followed every one of their wins with a loss. While the defeats were primarily caused by the suddenly hit-or-miss offense, Eberly played poorly in a few games and convinced coach Rohlik to give Terness a turn as the No. 1 in goal. After a decent stretch against weak opposition in February, the results turned pear-shaped over the final two weeks and Ohio State limped into the playoffs. Despite effectively playing even over the second half of their schedule, Ohio State was able to rise in the polls thanks to the overall strength of the Big Ten. By the time they were getting ready to begin their postseason run, Ohio State was in the top 10 for both the polls and the PairWise rankings and it would take an utter catastrophe to miss out on the tournament.

=== Conference tournament ===
In spite of their all-but-guaranteed berth, Ohio State still needed to rectify some issues that had cropped up during the latter part of the season. With neither goaltender playing particularly well, Terness was allowed to carry the club into the playoffs. He played admirably against Wisconsin, however, it was the intermittent scoring woes that cost the club the opening game of the series. The rematch was going similarly with the Buckeyes down 1–2 in the final minutes when Terness was pulled for an extra attacker. With less than 90 seconds left in the game, Fontaine tied the match and saved the club from an ignominious upset. After trading chances with the Badgers, the three transfers, Fontaine, Aiden Hansen-Bukata and Thompson, all combined to score the winning goal and force a deciding game three. The rubber match was tightly contested through the first two periods with both teams only managing a single goal. Wisconsin got into penalty trouble in the third, handing Ohio State four separate power plays in the final frame. While the offense continued to struggle, Burnside was able to break through on the team's fifth man-advantage of the evening and the Buckeyes never looked back. The Badgers pushed hard over the final 10 minutes but Terness managed to hold on for a 3–2 victory and send the team to the semifinals.

Against a surging Penn State, Ohio State's offense returned and the team needed every bit of scoring they could get. After taking an early lead on Fontaine's 15th of the season, Ohio State surrendered a pair in the second and were trailing after 40 minutes. Two Buckeye goals in the middle of the third gave them their second lead but it didn't even last for 3 minutes before the Nittany Lions tied the game for the fourth time. Ohio State looked the better of the two in overtime, allowing just 1 shot to each Terness in more than 14 minutes of ice time. The team's outstanding checking was evident on the winning goal when they turned the puck over at center ice, giving the Buckeyes a 2-on-1 break. Thompson's pass sent Fontaine in alone and he slid the puck five-hole to send Ohio State to their first conference title game in eight years.

Facing off against the #1 team in the nation, Michigan State, the Buckeyes could have hardly started worse. Ohio State took four penalties in the first period and surrendered two power play goals to the Spartans. While the team managed to claw back with goal from Joe Dunlap, MSU regained their 2-goal lead at the beginning of the third and gave the Buckeyes no room for error. The team found it difficult to break through the strong Spartan defense but, just past half-way part of the third, Damien Carfagna was able to cut the deficit back to one. About 5 minutes later, with Terness preparing to head off for an extra attacker, Fontaine came to the rescue once more with a goal off of a broken play. The two sides played mostly even in the first overtime but both goaltenders stood strong. MSU began to take over the game in the fifth period, widely outshooting the Buckeyes. On their 51st shot of the night, MSU was finally able to get the winning goal past Terness ending the longest game in Big Ten tournament history.

=== NCAA tournament ===
The Buckeyes had little time to reflect on their lost opportunity because the team received an at-large bid for the NCAA tournament and headed to Toledo to face Boston University. While the Buckeyes were the lower seed, they looked far better than the Terriers at the start and outshout BU 15–2 in the first period. Despite the huge disparity in play, Ohio State was only able to score one goal through 20 minutes. The Terriers began to skate in the second and near the middle of the period were able to even the count. The two then began exchanging goals over the second half of the frame and by the time the period was over the score sat at 3-all. Unfortunately for the Buckeyes, the third period turned into a complete debacle. After Terness surrendered a weak shot, the wheels came off of the team and seemingly every shot from BU found its way into the goal. Even when the Terriers took a penalty, they were the ones to score and every goal seemed to sap more and more of the Buckeyes' resolve. By the end of the game, even with Ohio State on a 6-on-3 advantage, Boston University was able to get ahold of the puck and score into the empty net, handing Ohio State one of the most embarrassing losses the team had suffered in recent memory.

== Departures ==
| Player | Position | Nationality | Cause |
|---|---|---|---|
| Scooter Brickey | Defenseman | United States | Graduation (signed with Wilkes-Barre/Scranton Penguins) |
| Matt Cassidy | Forward | United States | Graduation (retired) |
| Michael Gildon | Forward | United States | Graduation (signed with Worcester Railers) |
| Stephen Halliday | Forward | Canada | Signed professional contract (Ottawa Senators) |
| Riley Hughes | Forward | United States | Graduation (signed with Iowa Heartlanders) |
| Mason Klee | Defenseman | United States | Graduation (signed with Worcester Railers) |
| Dalton Messina | Forward | United States | Graduation (signed with Toledo Walleye) |
| Noah Powell | Forward | United States | Left mid-season; returned to juniors (Oshawa Generals) |
| Cam Thiesing | Forward | United States | Signed professional contract (New York Islanders) |

== Recruiting ==
| Player | Position | Nationality | Age | Notes |
|---|---|---|---|---|
| Chris Able | Defenseman | United States | 19 | Libertyville, IL |
| Gunnarwolfe Fontaine | Forward | United States | 23 | East Greenwich, RI; graduate transfer from Northeastern; selected 202nd overall in 2020 |
| Dylan Godbout | Forward | United States | 20 | Woodbury, MN |
| Aiden Hansen-Bukata | Defenseman | Canada | 25 | Vancouver, BC; graduate transfer from RIT |
| James Hong | Forward | South Korea | 19 | Irvine, CA |
| Nathan Lewis | Forward | United States | 20 | Chicago, IL |
| Noah Powell | Forward | United States | 19 | Northbrook, IL; selected 148th overall in 2024 |
| Chris Romaine | Defenseman | United States | 20 | Boston, MA; selected 193rd overall in 2022 |
| Jake Rozzi | Forward | Canada | 20 | Kirkland, QC |
| Riley Thompson | Forward | Canada | 22 | Orleans, ON; transfer from Alaska Anchorage |

== Roster ==
As of September 2, 2024.

| No. | Nat. | Player | Class | Pos | Height | Weight | DoB | Hometown | Previous team | NHL rights |
|---|---|---|---|---|---|---|---|---|---|---|
| 1 | (Canada) | Logan Terness | Senior | G | 6' 0" (1.83 m) | 175 lb (79 kg) | 2002-09-01 | North Vancouver, British Columbia | Connecticut (HEA) | — |
| 2 | (United States) | Chris Able | Freshman | D | 6' 1" (1.85 m) | 198 lb (90 kg) | 2004-11-04 | Libertyville, Illinois | Chicago Steel (USHL) | — |
| 4 | (United States) | John Larkin | Junior | D | 6' 2" (1.88 m) | 190 lb (86 kg) | 2001-01-26 | Northville, Michigan | Austin Bruins (NAHL) | — |
| 5 | (United States) | Chris Romaine | Freshman | D | 6' 0" (1.83 m) | 196 lb (89 kg) | 2004-02-21 | Boston, Massachusetts | Green Bay Gamblers (USHL) | COL, 193rd overall 2022 |
| 7 | (United States) | Brent Johnson | Senior | D | 6' 0" (1.83 m) | 185 lb (84 kg) | 2003-03-20 | Dallas, Texas | North Dakota (NCHC) | WSH, 80th overall 2021 |
| 8 | (United States) | Nathan McBrayer | Sophomore | D | 6' 0" (1.83 m) | 173 lb (78 kg) | 2004-05-11 | Dublin, Ohio | Muskegon Lumberjacks (USHL) | — |
| 9 | (Canada) | Riley Thompson | Sophomore | F | 6' 3" (1.91 m) | 190 lb (86 kg) | 2002-08-17 | Orleans, Ontario | Alaska Anchorage (NCAA) | — |
| 10 | (United States) | Thomas Weis | Sophomore | F | 5' 9" (1.75 m) | 170 lb (77 kg) | 2002-02-08 | Madison, Wisconsin | Madison Capitols (USHL) | — |
| 11 | (Canada) | Jake Rozzi | Freshman | F | 6' 0" (1.83 m) | 183 lb (83 kg) | 2004-01-27 | Kirkland, Quebec | Tri-City Storm (USHL) | — |
| 12 | (United States) | Caden Brown | Senior | D | 5' 11" (1.8 m) | 185 lb (84 kg) | 2003-06-22 | St. Louis, Missouri | Waterloo Black Hawks (USHL) | — |
| 13 | (United States) | Gunnarwolfe Fontaine | Graduate | F | 5' 10" (1.78 m) | 175 lb (79 kg) | 2000-09-16 | East Greenwich, Rhode Island | Northeastern (HEA) | NSH, 202nd overall 2020 |
| 15 | (United States) | Noah Powell | Freshman | F | 6' 2" (1.88 m) | 201 lb (91 kg) | 2005-02-02 | Northbrook, Illinois | Dubuque Fighting Saints (USHL) | PHI, 148th overall 2024 |
| 16 | (United States) | Max Montes | Sophomore | F | 5' 8" (1.73 m) | 165 lb (75 kg) | 2003-09-01 | Hartland, Wisconsin | Dubuque Fighting Saints (USHL) | — |
| 19 | (South Korea) | James Hong | Freshman | F | 5' 9" (1.75 m) | 168 lb (76 kg) | 2004-07-02 | Irvine, California | Madison Capitols (USHL) | — |
| 20 | (Canada) | Aiden Hansen-Bukata (A) | Graduate | D | 6' 0" (1.83 m) | 179 lb (81 kg) | 1999-06-29 | Delta, British Columbia | RIT (AHA) | — |
| 21 | (United States) | Joe Dunlap (A) | Graduate | F | 6' 0" (1.83 m) | 185 lb (84 kg) | 1999-11-30 | Windham, New Hampshire | Fargo Force (USHL) | — |
| 23 | (United States) | Davis Burnside (C) | Junior | F | 6' 0" (1.83 m) | 176 lb (80 kg) | 2003-09-22 | Scottsdale, Arizona | Dubuque Fighting Saints (USHL) | — |
| 25 | (United States) | Sam Deckhut | Sophomore | F | 5' 11" (1.8 m) | 186 lb (84 kg) | 2002-04-02 | San Diego, California | Sioux City Musketeers (USHL) | — |
| 26 | (United States) | Dylan Godbout | Freshman | F | 5' 11" (1.8 m) | 185 lb (84 kg) | 2004-05-05 | Woodbury, Minnesota | Sioux City Musketeers (USHL) | — |
| 28 | (United States) | William Smith | Sophomore | D | 6' 1" (1.85 m) | 193 lb (88 kg) | 2003-03-29 | Toronto, Ontario | Omaha Lancers (USHL) | — |
| 29 | (United States) | Ryan Gordon | Sophomore | F | 6' 0" (1.83 m) | 185 lb (84 kg) | 2002-05-05 | Duluth, Georgia | Sioux Falls Stampede (USHL) | — |
| 34 | (United States) | Reilly Herbst | Senior | G | 6' 0" (1.83 m) | 185 lb (84 kg) | 2000-02-17 | Niwot, Colorado | Omaha Lancers (USHL) | — |
| 44 | (Sweden) | Theo Wallberg | Sophomore | D | 6' 5" (1.96 m) | 203 lb (92 kg) | 2003-12-04 | Stockholm, Sweden | Dubuque Fighting Saints (USHL) | OTT, 168th overall 2022 |
| 60 | (United States) | Kristoffer Eberly | Sophomore | G | 6' 4" (1.93 m) | 208 lb (94 kg) | 2002-12-10 | Pinckney, Michigan | Green Bay Gamblers (USHL) | — |
| 63 | (United States) | Nathan Lewis | Freshman | F | 6' 6" (1.98 m) | 209 lb (95 kg) | 2004-07-27 | Chicago, Illinois | Youngstown Phantoms (USHL) | — |
| 71 | (United States) | Patrick Guzzo (C) | Graduate | F | 6' 3" (1.91 m) | 198 lb (90 kg) | 2001-11-27 | Marysville, Michigan | Waterloo Black Hawks (USHL) | — |
| 91 | (United States) | Jake Dunlap | Junior | F | 5' 9" (1.75 m) | 175 lb (79 kg) | 2001-12-05 | Windham, New Hampshire | New Hampshire (HEA) | — |
| 93 | (United States) | Damien Carfagna | Junior | D | 6' 0" (1.83 m) | 185 lb (84 kg) | 2002-12-12 | Wood-Ridge, New Jersey | New Hampshire (HEA) | — |

== Standings ==
2024–25 Big Ten ice hockey Standings
| | Conference record | | | | | | | | | | Overall record | | | | | |
| | GP | W | L | T | OTW | OTL | 3/SW | PTS | GF | GA | GP | W | L | T | GF | GA |
|---|---|---|---|---|---|---|---|---|---|---|---|---|---|---|---|---|
| #6 Michigan State †* | 24 | 15 | 5 | 4 | 2 | 1 | 2 | 50 | 92 | 60 | 37 | 26 | 7 | 4 | 129 | 77 |
| #9 Minnesota † | 24 | 15 | 6 | 3 | 1 | 3 | 0 | 50 | 87 | 62 | 40 | 25 | 11 | 4 | 154 | 101 |
| #11 Ohio State | 24 | 14 | 9 | 1 | 3 | 2 | 0 | 42 | 72 | 62 | 40 | 24 | 14 | 2 | 127 | 106 |
| #17 Michigan | 24 | 12 | 10 | 2 | 5 | 1 | 2 | 36 | 76 | 83 | 36 | 18 | 15 | 3 | 112 | 118 |
| #5 Penn State | 24 | 9 | 11 | 4 | 2 | 1 | 3 | 33 | 78 | 88 | 40 | 22 | 14 | 4 | 139 | 120 |
| Wisconsin | 24 | 7 | 16 | 1 | 1 | 6 | 0 | 27 | 64 | 77 | 37 | 13 | 21 | 3 | 108 | 110 |
| Notre Dame | 24 | 4 | 19 | 1 | 2 | 2 | 1 | 14 | 60 | 97 | 38 | 12 | 25 | 1 | 102 | 127 |
Championship: March 22, 2025 † indicates conference regular season champion * indicates conference tournament champion Rankings: USCHO.com Top 20 Poll

== Schedule and results ==
| Date | Time | Opponent^{#} | Rank^{#} | Site | TV | Decision | Result | Attendance | Record |
Exhibition
| October 6 | 2:00 pm | Niagara* | | Value City Arena • Columbus, Ohio (Exhibition) | | Eberly | W 3–2 ^{OT} | | |
Regular season
| October 11 | 7:00 pm | American International* | | Value City Arena • Columbus, Ohio | | Terness | T 3–3 ^{OT} | 2,623 | 0–0–1 |
| October 12 | 5:00 pm | American International* | | Value City Arena • Columbus, Ohio | | Eberly | W 5–2 | 2,464 | 1–0–1 |
| October 18 | 8:00 pm | at #16 Wisconsin | | Kohl Center • Madison, Wisconsin | | Terness | W 2–1 ^{OT} | 9,332 | 2–0–1 (1–0–0) |
| October 19 | 7:00 pm | at #16 Wisconsin | | Kohl Center • Madison, Wisconsin | | Eberly | W 2–1 | 11,782 | 3–0–1 (2–0–0) |
| October 25 | 7:07 pm | Bowling Green* | #19 | Value City Arena • Columbus, Ohio | | Terness | W 3–1 | 3,916 | 4–0–1 |
| October 26 | 7:07 pm | at Bowling Green* | #19 | Slater Family Ice Arena • Bowling Green, Ohio | Midco Sports+ | Eberly | W 2–0 | 4,563 | 5–0–1 |
| November 1 | 7:00 pm | Lake Superior State* | #15 | Value City Arena • Columbus, Ohio | | Terness | W 9–3 | 3,312 | 6–0–1 |
| November 2 | 5:00 pm | Lake Superior State* | #15 | Value City Arena • Columbus, Ohio | | Eberly | W 6–2 | 3,961 | 7–0–1 |
| November 8 | 7:00 pm | at #4 Michigan State | #13 | Munn Ice Arena • East Lansing, Michigan | | Terness | L 2–4 | 6,555 | 7–1–1 (2–1–0) |
| November 9 | 6:00 pm | at #4 Michigan State | #13 | Munn Ice Arena • East Lansing, Michigan | | Terness | L 1–4 | 6,555 | 7–2–1 (2–2–0) |
| November 15 | 8:10 pm | at Lindenwood* | #14 | Centene Community Ice Center • St. Charles, Missouri | | Eberly | W 5–2 | 2,067 | 8–2–1 |
| November 16 | 3:10 pm | at Lindenwood* | #14 | Centene Community Ice Center • St. Charles, Missouri | | Terness | W 3–2 | 1,705 | 9–2–1 |
| November 29 | 7:00 pm | at Princeton* | #12 | Hobey Baker Memorial Rink • Princeton, New Jersey | ESPN+ | Eberly | L 1–3 | 1,366 | 9–3–1 |
| November 30 | 4:00 pm | at Princeton* | #12 | Hobey Baker Memorial Rink • Princeton, New Jersey | ESPN+ | Terness | L 1–3 | 1,917 | 9–4–1 |
| December 5 | 7:30 pm | Penn State | #17 | Value City Arena • Columbus, Ohio | BTN | Eberly | W 4–0 | 3,875 | 10–4–1 (3–2–0) |
| December 6 | 7:00 pm | Penn State | #17 | Value City Arena • Columbus, Ohio | | Eberly | W 4–2 | 4,934 | 11–4–1 (4–2–0) |
| December 13 | 7:00 pm | Notre Dame | #15 | Value City Arena • Columbus, Ohio | | Eberly | W 2–1 ^{OT} | 4,009 | 12–4–1 (5–2–0) |
| December 14 | 7:00 pm | Notre Dame | #15 | Value City Arena • Columbus, Ohio | BTN | Eberly | W 3–1 | 4,363 | 13–4–1 (6–2–0) |
| January 3 | 5:00 pm | vs. #9 Michigan | #13 | Wrigley Field • Chicago, Illinois (Frozen Confines) | BTN | Eberly | W 4–3 | 25,709 | 14–4–1 (7–2–0) |
| January 5 | 5:00 pm | at #9 Michigan | #13 | Yost Ice Arena • Ann Arbor, Michigan (Rivalry) | | Terness | L 2–3 ^{OT} | 5,800 | 14–5–1 (7–3–0) |
| January 10 | 7:00 pm | #3 Minnesota | #11 | Value City Arena • Columbus, Ohio | BTN+ | Eberly | W 5–1 | 3,315 | 15–5–1 (8–3–0) |
| January 11 | 6:30 pm | #3 Minnesota | #11 | Value City Arena • Columbus, Ohio | BTN | Eberly | L 1–6 | 5,973 | 15–6–1 (8–4–0) |
| January 24 | 7:00 pm | at Penn State | #9 | Pegula Ice Arena • University Park, Pennsylvania | | Eberly | T 6–6 ^{SOL} | 6,569 | 15–6–2 (8–4–1) |
| January 25 | 5:00 pm | at Penn State | #9 | Pegula Ice Arena • University Park, Pennsylvania | | Terness | L 2–3 ^{OT} | 6,604 | 15–7–2 (8–5–1) |
| January 30 | 8:00 pm | #2 Michigan State | #11 | Value City Arena • Columbus, Ohio | BTN | Terness | W 4–2 | 5,339 | 16–7–2 (9–5–1) |
| January 31 | 7:00 pm | #2 Michigan State | #11 | Value City Arena • Columbus, Ohio | | Eberly | L 1–4 | 6,617 | 16–8–2 (9–6–1) |
| February 7 | 7:05 pm | at Notre Dame | #9 | Compton Family Ice Arena • Notre Dame, Indiana | Peacock | Terness | W 5–1 | 5,165 | 17–8–2 (10–6–1) |
| February 8 | 6:05 pm | at Notre Dame | #9 | Compton Family Ice Arena • Notre Dame, Indiana | Peacock | Terness | W 5–1 | 5,212 | 18–8–2 (11–6–1) |
| February 14 | 7:00 pm | Wisconsin | #8 | Value City Arena • Columbus, Ohio | | Terness | W 4–1 | 4,947 | 19–8–2 (12–6–1) |
| February 15 | 8:30 pm | Wisconsin | #8 | Value City Arena • Columbus, Ohio | BTN | Eberly | W 4–2 | 5,489 | 20–8–2 (13–6–1) |
| February 21 | 8:00 pm | at #5 Minnesota | #7 | 3M Arena at Mariucci • Minneapolis, Minnesota | | Terness | L 1–4 | 10,500 | 20–9–2 (13–7–1) |
| February 22 | 6:00 pm | at #5 Minnesota | #7 | 3M Arena at Mariucci • Minneapolis | | Terness | L 3–6 | 10,565 | 20–10–2 (13–8–1) |
| February 27 | 8:00 pm | #11 Michigan | #8 | Value City Arena • Columbus, Ohio (Rivalry) | BTN | Terness | W 2–1 ^{OT} | 7,523 | 21–10–2 (14–8–1) |
| February 28 | 6:00 pm | #11 Michigan | #8 | Value City Arena • Columbus, Ohio (Rivalry) | BTN | Eberly | L 3–4 | 9,225 | 21–11–2 (14–9–1) |
Big Ten Tournament
| March 7 | 7:00 pm | Wisconsin | #9 | Nationwide Arena • Columbus, Ohio (Quarterfinals Game 1) | B1G+ | Terness | L 1–4 | 1,747 | 21–12–2 |
| March 8 | 7:00 pm | Wisconsin | #9 | Nationwide Arena • Columbus, Ohio (Quarterfinals Game 2) | B1G+ | Terness | W 3–2 ^{OT} | 2,181 | 22–12–2 |
| March 9 | 7:00 pm | Wisconsin | #9 | Nationwide Arena • Columbus, Ohio (Quarterfinals Game 3) | B1G+ | Terness | W 3–2 | 962 | 23–12–2 |
| March 15 | 8:30 pm | #11 Penn State | #10 | Value City Arena • Columbus, Ohio (Semifinals) | BTN | Terness | W 4–3 ^{OT} | 2,900 | 24–12–2 |
| March 22 | 7:30 pm | at #1 Michigan State | #9 | Munn Ice Arena • East Lansing, Michigan (Championship) | BTN | Terness | L 3–4 ^{2OT} | 6,555 | 24–13–2 |
NCAA Tournament
| March 27 | 2:00 pm | vs. #8 Boston University* | #9 | Huntington Center • Toledo, Ohio (Regional Semifinal) | ESPNU | Terness | L 3–8 | | 24–14–2 |
*Non-conference game. ^{#}Rankings from USCHO.com Poll. All times are in Eastern Time. Source:

== NCAA tournament ==
| March 27, 2025; 2:00 pm | (2) Boston University | 8–3 (0–1, 3–2, 5–0) | (3) Ohio State | Huntington Center; Attendance: 6,907 |

Game reference

Mikhail Yegorov
Goalies
Logan Terness
Referees:
Nick Krebsbach
Brandon Schmitt
Linesmen:
Eric Frank
Chris Williams

| | 0–1 | 09:06 – Joe Dunlap (7) (Hansen-Bukata, Ja. Dunlap) |
| (Kaplan, Bednarik) Cole Eiserman (22) – 28:07 | 1–1 |
| | 1–2 | 32:50 – PP – Joe Dunlap (8) (Rozzi, Hansen-Bukata) |
| (C. Hutson, Greene) Quinn Hutson (22) – PP – 37:19 | 2–2 |
| | 2–3 | 37:49 – Max Montes (14) (Weis, Able) |
| (Hughes, Harvey) Matt Copponi (5) – 38:01 | 3–3 |
| (Copponi, Willander) Aiden Celebrini (5) – GW – 42:18 | 4–3 |
| (Greene, C. Hutson) Jack Hughes (6) – SH – 45:25 | 5–3 |
| (C. Hutson) Cole Eiserman (23) – 48:07 | 6–3 |
| (Hughes, Boumedienne) Jack Harvey (10) – 54:16 | 7–3 |
| (unassisted) Cole Hutson (13) – SH EN – 59:30 | 8–3 |

24 min
Penalties
4 min
23
Shots
36

Game summary
The game began slowly with both teams trying to feel one another out. A few one-and-done chances were obtained but the first five minutes was dominated by turnovers from both sides. The first real chance of the game came when Riley Thompson skated through the BU defense at 4:20 but Mikhail Yegorov made the save. Ohio State was able to establish some zone time afterwards but they were kept to the outside and unable to generate a scoring chance. The game returned to being a sleepy affair until the middle of the period. After setting up in the Terriers' end the puck came to Aiden Hansen-Bukata at the point. The Buckeye defenseman fired a soft shot on goal that Yegorov stopped with his pad but the puck bounced right to the stick of Joe Dunlap who had a wide-open cage and did not miss for the game's opening goal. Less than a minute later, Quinn Hutson was whistled for a slashing call to give OSU a chance to increase their lead. Yegorov was called upon to make several stops during the kill but it was Gavin McCarthy who made the biggest save when he rescued a puck from the goal line after it had leaked through the BU goaltender. Ohio State remained in control of the action for several minutes after their man-advantage thanks in part to their early dominance on faceoffs. After Yegorov made another key save from in tight, Cole Hutson took his turn in the penalty box with a hooking minor. Ohio State moved the puck well on the power play but missed on a few of their passes. Yegorov was forced to make a few saves in the back half of the man-advantage but BU was able to get control of the rebounds and clear the puck out of danger. OSU kept the Terriers on their heels until they committed an icing and allowed the Terriers to get some breathing room. BU was finally able to get its second shot of the game shortly afterwards but by the end of the period they found themselves trailing Ohio State 2–15 in that department. The only bright spot in the entire period for BU was that OSU was called for a penalty at the end and the Terriers would begin the second with their first power play of the match.

After a slow start, Boston University was able to finally get its first real scoring chance on the power play but Logan Terness was equal to the task. Ohio State's 50th-ranked penalty kill was able to stymie the Terriers and retain their lead. However, the momentum began to shift and BU was able to finally establish some offensive zone time afterwards to try and even out the play. After another giveaway by BU around the 5-minute mark, Yegorov had to make another big save in tight, this time on Patrick Guzzo. The Terriers began to show of their offensive talent in the middle of the period but the OSU defense was able to block several shots. Right after winning an offensive draw, Cole Eiserman rifled a shot into the top corner of the net to tie the game. BU began to take over after their goal until Gunnarwolfe Fontaine broke in on the Terrier goal just after the midway point of the game. Yegorov made the save and the match began to see-saw between the two clubs. Before anything could happen, however, Devin Kaplan smacked one of the OSU players in the head with his forearm and was given a roughing minor. The bad penalty ended up costing BU as Joe Dunlap scored his second of the game off of the rush. BU got right back on the attack after the penalty but the Ohio State defense limited the Terriers to long shots on goal that Terness was able to stop. With just over 3 minutes in the period, Jake Dunlap was called for hooking. After a pretty bit of passing, the nation's #5 power play connected when a wide-open Quinn Hutson wired the puck in off of the goal post. Riding high off of their second goal, BU Gave up a 2-on-1 and allowed the Buckeyes to take a lead when Max Montes fired low-stick on Yegorov. Just 12 seconds later, Matt Copponi received a pass from behind the cage and smacked the puck past Terness to even the count once more. With the two teams doing their best to wear out the goal horn, Shane Lachance took a very ill-advised interference penalty and was nearly given a second for arguing with the referees. About a minute in, Thompson nearly made the Terriers pay a second time but couldn't get the proper angle on a deflected puck and missed a wide-open net. Just as time was expiring, Joe Dunlap scored what he believed was his third of the game but time had expired moments before the puck entered the net and the game remained tied.

After BU was able to salt away the remainder of the penalty at the start of the third, Lachance got a good chance on goal but Terness was able to stop his relatively weak shot. A few minutes later, Terness failed to stop another weak shot from Aiden Celebrini then slipped under his right arm. With their first lead of the game, BU remained on the attack but OSU countered and the two started skating up and down the ice, trying to break through the opposing defenses. By this point, the Terriers had begun to take over on the faceoff dot but the Buckeyes used their structure to take control of the puck and generate another good scoring chance. While Yegorov made the save, the Terriers took their fifth minor of the game immediately afterwards to give Ohio State a golden opportunity to tie the match once more. A few seconds into the man-advantage, the puck bounced right to the BU defenders on the blueline and Jack Hughes carried the puck up the ice on a 2-on-1. The BU forward shot the puck and it was deflected past Terness by an OSU stick to double the lead. About a minute later, Cole Hutson was almost scored on a second 2-on-1 shorthanded chance. Shortly after the penalty expired, Eiserman smacked the puck backhanded from behind the goal line. The puck hit Terness as he was hugging the post but it found a hole and dropped into the goal. With the complexion of the game completely changed, OSU had to now abandon its defensive structure in the hope of finding three goals in the final 12 minutes. This however, only served to feed into the BU offense and allowed the Terriers to continue firing the puck on the Ohio State goal. Just past the 10-minute mark, Eiserman nearly completed a hat-trick when he shot at a half-empty cage but the puck hit the right post and bounced out the other side. Afterwards, the Buckeyes began to press but Yegorov remained strong in goal and kept the puck out of the net. On a counterattack, Jack Harvey made a move around a Buckeye defender and found himself wide open in front of the net. He flipped the puck into the top corner to give BU a 4-goal lead with under 6 minutes to play. The rest of the game was a bit loose as both teams seemed to understand that the game was essentially over. The Buckeyes were a bit physical in the waning moments but it was the Terriers who were called for a penalty when Celebrini was given a minor for interference with about 2 minutes left on the clock. Devin Kaplan then received a 2- and a 10-minute for yelling at the referees. With a 2-man advantage, Terness was pulled to give the Buckeyes a fleeting chance to tie. However, with less than a minute to play, Cole Hutson got control of the puck, danced through two OSU defenders and scored into the empty net to essentially end the game.

== Scoring statistics ==
| Name | Position | Games | Goals | Assists | Points | PIM |
|---|---|---|---|---|---|---|
| Gunnarwolfe Fontaine | C/LW | 40 | 17 | 23 | 40 | 6 |
| Riley Thompson | F | 40 | 17 | 16 | 33 | 32 |
| Davis Burnside | F | 40 | 14 | 19 | 33 | 18 |
| Aiden Hansen-Bukata | D | 38 | 2 | 29 | 31 | 20 |
| Damien Carfagna | D | 38 | 7 | 21 | 28 | 6 |
| Max Montes | F | 40 | 14 | 12 | 26 | 16 |
| Joe Dunlap | C/RW | 39 | 8 | 14 | 22 | 22 |
| Patrick Guzzo | C | 36 | 9 | 7 | 16 | 8 |
| Sam Deckhut | C | 37 | 6 | 8 | 14 | 10 |
| Brent Johnson | D | 38 | 5 | 8 | 13 | 4 |
| Ryan Gordon | C | 39 | 5 | 8 | 13 | 27 |
| James Hong | F | 34 | 4 | 9 | 13 | 17 |
| Jake Rozzi | LW | 33 | 5 | 7 | 12 | 2 |
| Nathan McBrayer | D | 40 | 4 | 6 | 10 | 22 |
| Chris Able | D | 32 | 0 | 9 | 9 | 6 |
| Theo Wallberg | D | 27 | 0 | 8 | 8 | 10 |
| Thomas Weis | C | 35 | 2 | 5 | 7 | 19 |
| William Smith | D | 36 | 3 | 3 | 6 | 29 |
| Nathan Lewis | LW | 28 | 2 | 4 | 6 | 2 |
| Noah Powell | RW | 17 | 2 | 3 | 5 | 4 |
| Jake Dunlap | F | 21 | 0 | 4 | 4 | 2 |
| Cade Brown | C | 3 | 1 | 1 | 2 | 0 |
| Dylan Godbout | F | 14 | 0 | 1 | 1 | 2 |
| Logan Terness | G | 25 | 0 | 1 | 1 | 0 |
| John Larkin | D | 7 | 0 | 0 | 0 | 0 |
| Chris Romaine | D | 9 | 0 | 0 | 0 | 4 |
| Kristoffer Eberly | G | 17 | 0 | 0 | 0 | 0 |
| Total | | | 127 | 224 | 351 | 304 |

== Goaltending statistics ==
| Name | Games | Minutes | Wins | Losses | Ties | Goals against | Saves | Shut outs | SV % | GAA |
|---|---|---|---|---|---|---|---|---|---|---|
| Kristoffer Eberly | 18 | 974:50 | 12 | 4 | 1 | 37 | 400 | 2 | .915 | 2.28 |
| Logan Terness | 27 | 1485:01 | 12 | 10 | 1 | 61 | 678 | 0 | .917 | 2.46 |
| Empty Net | - | 19:02 | - | - | - | 8 | - | - | - | - |
| Total | 40 | 2478:53 | 24 | 14 | 2 | 106 | 1078 | 2 | .904 | 2.57 |

== Rankings ==
| Poll | Week | | | | | | | | | | | | | | | | | | | | | | | | | | | |
| Poll | Pre | 1 | 2 | 3 | 4 | 5 | 6 | 7 | 8 | 9 | 10 | 11 | 12 | 13 | 14 | 15 | 16 | 17 | 18 | 19 | 20 | 21 | 22 | 23 | 24 | 25 | 26 | 27 (Final) |
|---|---|---|---|---|---|---|---|---|---|---|---|---|---|---|---|---|---|---|---|---|---|---|---|---|---|---|---|---|
| USCHO.com | RV | RV | RV | 19 | 15 | 13 | 14 | 14 | 12 | 17 | 15 | 14 | – | 13 | 11 | 8 | 9 | 11 | 9 | 8 | 7 | 8 | 9 | 10 | 9 | 9 | - | 11 |
| USA Hockey | RV | RV | RV | 17т | 15 | 12 | 14 | 12 | 12 | 16 | 15 | 14 | – | 13 | 11 | 8 | 8 | 11 | 11 | 8 | 6 | 10 | 10 | 10 | 9 | 9 | 11 | 12 |

Note: USCHO did not release a poll in week 12 or 26.
Note: USA Hockey did not release a poll in week 12.

== Awards and honors ==
| Player | Award | Ref |
|---|---|---|
| Steve Rohlik | Big Ten Coach of the Year | |
| Damien Carfagna | Big Ten All-Tournament Team | |
| Gunnarwolfe Fontaine | Big Ten All-Tournament Team | |

== Players drafted into the NHL ==
| Round | Pick | Player | NHL team |
|---|---|---|---|
| 5 | 155 | Jackson Crowder ^{†} | Washington Capitals |
| 7 | 219 | Ryan Rucinski ^{†} | Buffalo Sabres |

† incoming freshman
