= Justin Janicke =

American ice hockey player (born 2003)

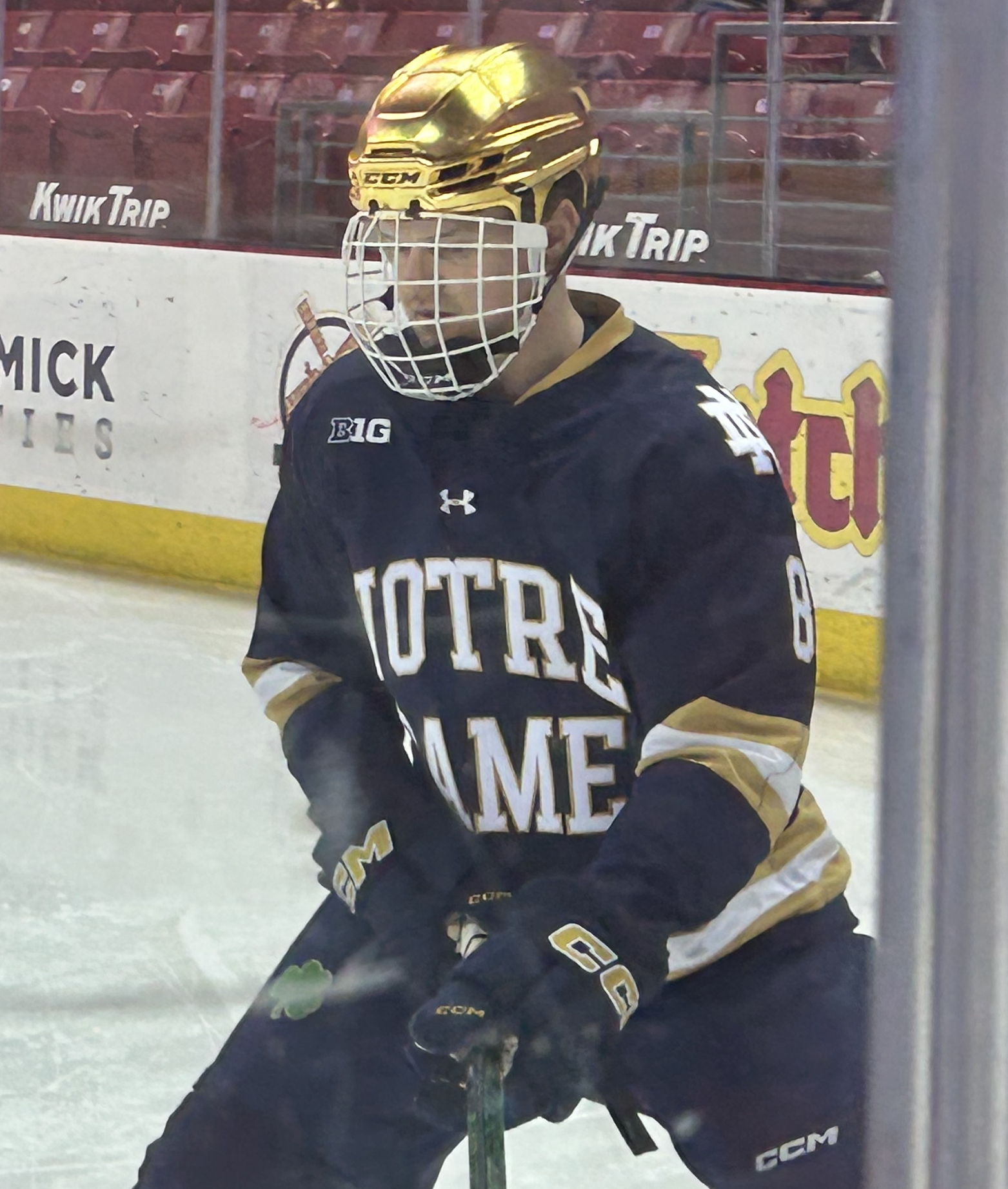
- Janicke playing with the Notre Dame Fighting Irish in February 2024
- Born: June 30, 2003 (age 23) Maple Grove, Minnesota, U.S.
- Height: 5 ft 11 in (180 cm)
- Weight: 192 lb (87 kg; 13 st 10 lb)
- Position: Forward
- Shoots: Left
- AHL team (P) Cur. team: Coachella Valley Firebirds; Kansas City Mavericks (ECHL)
- NHL draft: 195th overall, 2021; Seattle Kraken
- Playing career: 2025–present

Justin Scott Janicke (born June 30, 2003) is an American ice hockey forward who is currently for the Kansas City Mavericks in the ECHL while under contract to the Coachella Valley Firebirds in the American Hockey League (AHL). He previously played college hockey for the Notre Dame Fighting Irish in the NCAA's Big Ten Conference and is a prospect for the Seattle Kraken of the National Hockey League (NHL), who selected him 195th overall in the seventh round of the 2021 NHL entry draft.

== Playing career ==
During the 2017–18 season, Janicke played bantam-level hockey with the Great Plains team in the Minnesota Bantam Elite League. The following season, in 2018–19, he continued to develop his game by playing for Maple Grove High School, contributing significantly to the team's success while gaining valuable experience at the high school level. In addition to his high school play, Janicke also competed with the Minnesota Blades, a prestigious U16 AAA program known for producing elite hockey talent.

In the 2019–20 season, Janicke became part of the United States NTDP in the USHL, where he recorded 37 points in 45 games with the U-17 squad. He went on to play college hockey for the University of Notre Dame during the 2021–22 season. That same year, he was selected by the Seattle Kraken in the seventh round, 195th overall, of the 2021 NHL entry draft.

On March 30, 2025, Janicke signed an amateur tryout offer with the Kraken's American Hockey League (AHL) affiliate, the Coachella Valley Firebirds.

== International play ==
Janicke participated in the 2019 World U-17 Hockey Challenge, where he played a key role in helping Team USA secure a silver medal. Building on that experience, he once again donned the U.S. jersey in 2021, representing his country at the IIHF World U18 Championships.

== Career statistics ==
=== Regular season and playoffs ===
			Regular season					Playoffs
Season	Team	League	GP	G	A	Pts	PIM	GP	G	A	Pts	PIM
2017–18	Great Plains	MNBEL	15	7	3	10	0	—	—	—	—	—
2017–18	Maple Grove High School	MSHSL	24	19	30	49	26	3	1	4	5	0
2019–20	USNTDP	USHL	31	10	10	20	24	—	—	—	—	—
2019–20	USNTDP U-17 Team	USHL	45	17	20	37	34	—	—	—	—	—
2019–20	USNTDP U-18 Team	USHL	6	1	0	1	0	—	—	—	—	—
2020–21	USNTDP	USHL	18	4	6	10	8	—	—	—	—	—
2020–21	USNTDP U-17 Team	USHL	1	0	1	1	0	—	—	—	—	—
2020–21	USNTDP U-18 Team	USHL	43	12	16	28	16	—	—	—	—	—
2021–22	University of Notre Dame	B1G	33	2	8	10	31	—	—	—	—	—
2022–23	University of Notre Dame	B1G	36	7	7	14	32	—	—	—	—	—
2023–24	University of Notre Dame	B1G	36	4	12	16	47	—	—	—	—	—
2024–25	University of Notre Dame	B1G	38	15	19	34	29	—	—	—	—	—
2024–25	Coachella Valley Firebirds	AHL	1	0	1	1	0	—	—	—	—	—
2025–26	Kansas City Mavericks	ECHL	56	15	19	34	41	20	4	7	11	6
2025–26	Coachella Valley Firebirds	AHL	11	0	2	2	4	—	—	—	—	—
AHL totals			12	0	3	3	4	—	—	—	—	—

=== International ===
Year	Team	Event	Result	GP	G	A	Pts	PIM
2019	United States	U17	2nd place, silver medalist(s)	6	1	4	5	2
2021	United States	U18	5th	5	0	0	0	0
Junior totals				11	1	4	5	2
