= Karsen Dorwart =

American ice hockey player (born 2002)

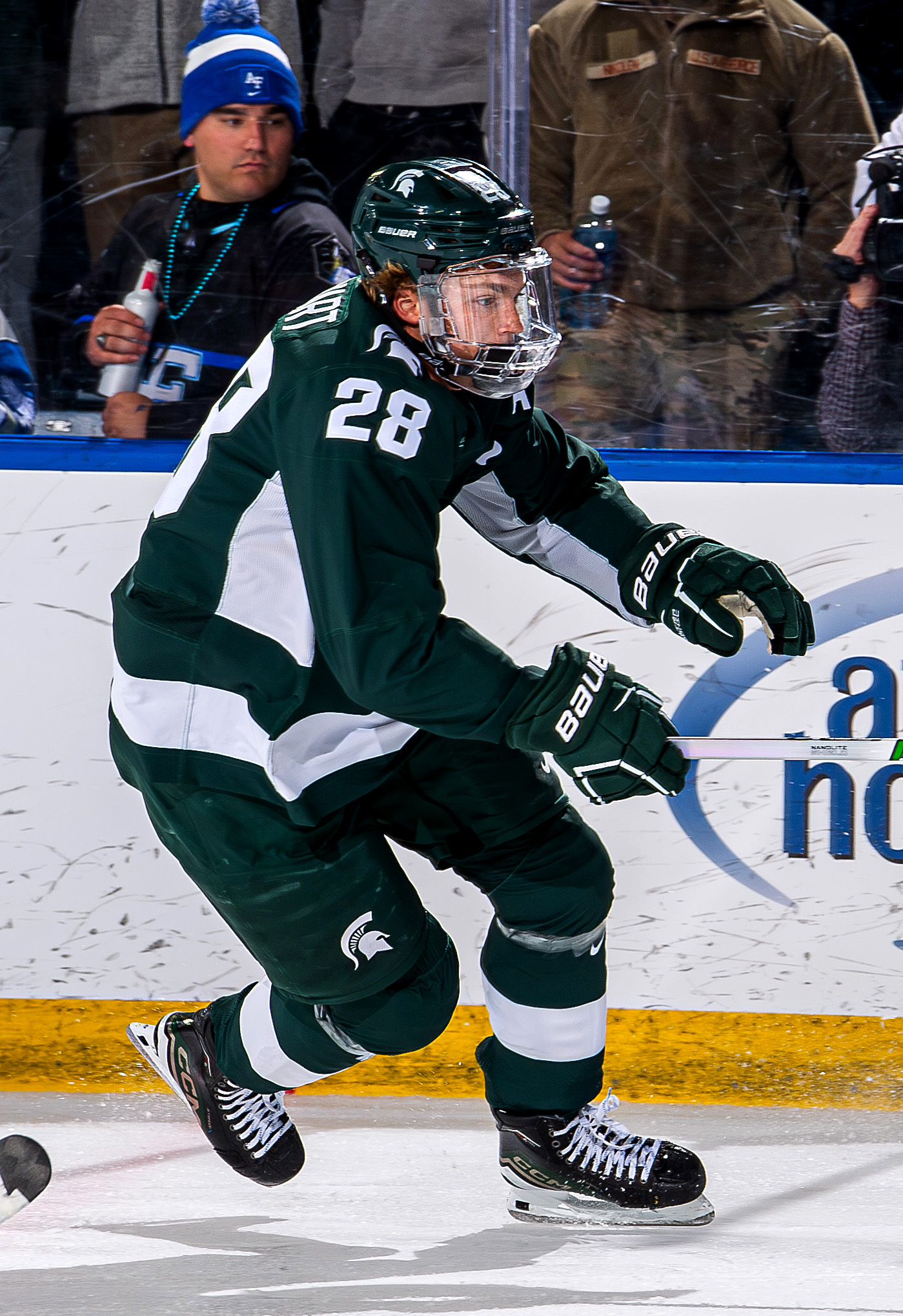
- Dorwart with the Michigan State Spartans in 2023
- Born: September 17, 2002 (age 24) Sherwood, Oregon, U.S.
- Height: 6 ft 1 in (185 cm)
- Weight: 194 lb (88 kg; 13 st 12 lb)
- Position: Forward
- Shoots: Left
- AHL team Former teams: Charlotte Checkers; Philadelphia Flyers
- NHL draft: Undrafted
- Playing career: 2025–present

Karsen Dorwart (born September 17, 2002) is an American professional ice hockey forward for the Charlotte Checkers of the American Hockey League (AHL). He previously played for the Philadelphia Flyers of the National Hockey League (NHL).

== Early and personal life ==
Karsen Dorwart was born on September 17, 2002 to Gregg and Janelle Dorwart in Sherwood, Oregon. His parents are originally from Minnesota. He has one sister, Kalli.

Dorwart cites the Portland Winterhawks as one of the sources for his interest in hockey. His family were season ticket members for the Winterhawks and Dorwart would attend their practices, as well as skate on the same rink as them in his youth.

Dorwart attended and played hockey for the Hotchkiss School, but earned his diploma from the University of Nebraska High School. While at Michigan State University he was enrolled as an Advertisement Management major.

Dorwart is good friends with former Sioux Falls Stampede and Michigan State University teammate Daniel Russell.

== Playing career ==
Dorwart played youth hockey with the San Jose Junior Sharks, then also with the Hotchkiss School's ice hockey team.

After leaving Hotchkiss, Dorwart played for the Sioux Falls Stampede of the United States Hockey League (USHL) before committing to Michigan State University in 2022. Dorwart found success at Michigan State on the first line, centering for fellow Stampede alum Daniel Russell, and was named an alternate captain for the team in his sophomore season.

As an undrafted free agent, Dorwart was signed a two-year entry level contract with the Philadelphia Flyers on March 29, 2025. He forewent his final year of NCAA eligibility and made his NHL debut with the Flyers on April 5, 2025 in a 3–2 loss to the Montreal Canadiens.

After one season playing for the Flyers' AHL affiliate, the Lehigh Valley Phantoms, he was not tendered a qualifying offer by the Flyers, making him an unrestricted free agent. He signed a one-year, two-way AHL contract with the Charlotte Checkers on September 11, 2026.

== Career statistics ==
			Regular season					Playoffs
Season	Team	League	GP	G	A	Pts	PIM	GP	G	A	Pts	PIM
2021–22	Sioux Falls Stampede	USHL	61	9	16	25	6	—	—	—	—	—
2022–23	Michigan State University	B1G	38	10	17	27	8	—	—	—	—	—
2023–24	Michigan State University	B1G	38	15	19	34	28	—	—	—	—	—
2024–25	Michigan State University	B1G	35	13	18	31	12	—	—	—	—	—
2024–25	Philadelphia Flyers	NHL	5	0	0	0	2	—	—	—	—	—
2025–26	Lehigh Valley Phantoms	AHL	70	10	14	24	18	—	—	—	—	—
NHL totals			5	0	0	0	2	—	—	—	—	—
