= 2025 Spengler Cup =

Ice hockey tournament in Switzerland

Tournament details
- Host country: Switzerland
- Venue: Eisstadion Davos
- Dates: 26–31 December
- Teams: 6

Final positions
- Champions: (Switzerland) HC Davos (17th title)
- Runners-up: (United States) U.S. Collegiate Selects

Tournament statistics
- Games played: 11
- Goals scored: 67 (6.09 per game)

Official website
- Spengler Cup

The 2025 Spengler Cup was held from 26 to 31 December 2025 at Eisstadion Davos, Davos.

== Teams participating ==
- (Switzerland) HC Davos (host)
- Team Canada
- (Switzerland) HC Fribourg-Gottéron
- (Finland) IFK Helsinki
- (Czech Republic) HC Sparta Praha
- (United States) U.S. Collegiate Selects

== Group stage ==
All times are local (UTC+1).

=== Group Torriani ===
Pos	Team	Pld	W	OTW	OTL	L	GF	GA	GD	Pts	Qualification
1	(Switzerland) HC Fribourg-Gottéron	2	2	0	0	0	9	5	+4	6	Semifinals
2	(Czech Republic) HC Sparta Praha	2	1	0	0	1	6	6	0	3	Quarterfinals
3	(Finland) IFK Helsinki	2	0	0	0	2	4	8	−4	0	Quarterfinals

Source: spenglercup.ch

26 December 2025; 15:10	HC Fribourg-Gottéron (Switzerland)	5–2 (1–0, 1–0, 3–2)	(Czech Republic) HC Sparta Praha	Eisstadion Davos

Game reference

Reto Berra
Goalies
Jakub Kovář

Biasca (Bertschy, Borgström) – 01:21	1–0
Biasca (Sörensen, Kapla) (PP) – 38:20	2–0
Borgström (Sörensen, Rau) (PP) – 40:19	3–0
Sörensen (Schmid, De la Rose) – 48:49	4–0
	4–1	50:22 – Kousal
Sörensen (EN) – 58:26	5–1
	5–2	59:53 – Špaček (Chlapík, Krejčík) (PP2, EA)

24 min
Penalties
8 min
30
Shots
27

27 December 2025; 15:10	IFK Helsinki (Finland)	1–4 (0–1, 1–2, 0–1)	(Czech Republic) HC Sparta Praha	Eisstadion Davos

Game reference

Hugo Alnefelt
Goalies
Jakub Kovář

	0–1	08:27 – Hrabík (Chlapík, Špaček (PP)
	0–2	28:46 – Dzierkals (Krejčík)
Mäkiaho (Pezzullo) – 38:00	1–2
	1–3	38:48 – Irving (Shore)
	1–4	59:32 – Kousal (Řepík) (PP)

8 min
Penalties
4 min
24
Shots
36

28 December 2025; 15:10	HC Fribourg-Gottéron (Switzerland)	4–3 (1–2, 2–0, 1–1)	(Finland) IFK Helsinki	Eisstadion Davos

Game reference

Loïc Galley
Goalies
Niko Hovinen

	0–1	01:01 – Larsen (Ragnarsson)
Sörensen (Seiler) – 06:54	1–1
	1–2	09:13 – Somppi (PP)
Biasca (Borgström) – 21:00	2–2
Friman (Biasca) – 32:22	3–2
De la Rose (Kapla, Ljunggren) (PP) – 43:35	4–2
	4–3	56:34 – Palmu (Melart)

37 min
Penalties
37 min
29
Shots
25

=== Group Cattini ===
Pos	Team	Pld	W	OTW	OTL	L	GF	GA	GD	Pts	Qualification
1	(United States) U.S. Collegiate Selects	2	1	0	0	1	7	6	+1	3 (Note: U.S. Collegiate Selects 3 Pts, +1 GD; HC Davos 3 Pts, +1 GD; Team Canada 3 Pts, –2 GD. Davos 3–5 U.S. Collegiate Selects.)	Semifinals
2	(Switzerland) HC Davos (H)	2	1	0	0	1	7	6	+1	3	Quarterfinals
3	Team Canada	2	1	0	0	1	4	6	−2	3	Quarterfinals

Source: spenglercup.ch
(H) Host
Notes:

26 December 2025; 20:15	Team Canada	3–2 (0–0, 3–1, 0–1)	(United States) U.S. Collegiate Selects	Eisstadion Davos

Game reference

James Reimer
Goalies
Joshua Kotai

Schnarr (Grant) (SH) – 24:10	1–0
Seney (Clarke) – 25:34	2–0
Shaw (Foudy, Grant) – 30:51	3–0
	3–1	31:50 – McCartthy (Muldowney)
	3–2	47:50 – Musa

8 min
Penalties
4 min
35
Shots
30

27 December 2025; 20:15	HC Davos (Switzerland)	3–5 (0–1, 2–2, 1–2)	(United States) U.S. Collegiate Selects	Eisstadion Davos

Game reference

Sandro Aeschlimann
Goalies
Adam Gajan

	0–1	02:31 – Finley (Fink)
	0–2	21:42 – DiMarsico (Fink)
Frehner – 22:13	1–2
Jung (Asplund, Gross) (SH) – 36:41	2–2
	2–3	37:12 – DiMarsico (Cerrato)
	2–4	41:53 – Finley (Hughes, Plante)
Fora (Corvi, Lemieux) – 45:57	3–4
	3–5	57:49 – Pohlkamp (Finley, Plante) (PP)

33 min
Penalties
4 min
32
Shots
38

28 December 2025; 20:15	Team Canada	1–4 (0–1, 1–0, 0–3)	(Switzerland) HC Davos	Eisstadion Davos

Game reference

James Reimer
Goalies
Luca Hollenstein

	0–1	19:56 – Zadina (Ryfors, Lemieux)
Brouillard (Hicketts) – 21:18	1–1
	1–2	45:03 – Asplund (Stránský)
	1–3	50:09 – Frehner (Knak, Nussbaumer)
	1–4	59:25 – Stránský (Corvi) (EN)

8 min
Penalties
6 min
22
Shots
33

== Knockout stage ==
=== Bracket ===
Quarterfinals
29 December
T2 (Czech Republic) HC Sparta Praha	5
C3 Team Canada	1
29 December
C2 (Switzerland) HC Davos	3
T3 (Finland) IFK Helsinki	0

Semifinals
30 December
C1 (United States) U.S. Collegiate Selects	5
T2 (Czech Republic) HC Sparta Praha	3
30 December
T1 (Switzerland) HC Fribourg-Gottéron	1
C2 (Switzerland) HC Davos	3

Final
31 December
C1 (United States) U.S. Collegiate Selects	3
C2 (Switzerland) HC Davos	6

=== Quarterfinals ===
29 December 2025; 15:10	HC Sparta Praha (Czech Republic)	5–1 (0–0, 0–0, 5–1)	Team Canada	Eisstadion Davos

Game reference

Jakub Kovář
Goalies
Connor Hughes

Dzierkals (Irving, Hrabík) – 46:46	1–0
	1–1	53:07 – Peca (Seney, Brouillard)
Chlapík (Vesalainen) – 54:42	2–1
Dzierkals (Raška) (EN) – 58:18	3–1
Vesalainen (EN) – 59:12	4–1
Němeček (Sirota) – 59:58	5–1

4 min
Penalties
2 min
26
Shots
30

29 December 2025; 20:15	HC Davos (Switzerland)	3–0 (1–0, 1–0, 1–0)	(Finland) IFK Helsinki	Eisstadion Davos

Game reference

Sandro Aeschlimann
Goalies
Hugo Alnefelt

Zadina (Ryfors, Barandun) – 11:09	1–0
Ryfors (Lemieux, Zadina) – 22:10	2–0
Kessler (Asplund, Stránský) (EN) – 58:51	3–0

2 min
Penalties
6 min
29
Shots
24

=== Semifinals ===
30 December 2025; 15:10	U.S. Collegiate Selects (United States)	5–3 (2–1, 2–1, 1–1)	(Czech Republic) HC Sparta Praha	Eisstadion Davos

Game reference

Alex Tracy
Goalies
Jakub Kovář

Pohlkamp (Livanavage, Hughes) (PP) – 06:44	1–0
Fink (Finley) – 07:38	2–0
	2–1	11:47 – Vitouch (Dzierkals)
	2–2	20:13 – Chlapík
Cerrato (Fink, Gadowsky) (PP) – 31:43	3–2
Fink (Nelson, Borgesi) – 38:42	4–2
Fink (Finley, Hughes) – 41:02	5–2
	5–3	52:53 – Chlapík (Kousal, Řepík) (PP, EA)

8 min
Penalties
8 min
26
Shots
35

30 December 2025; 20:15	HC Fribourg-Gottéron (Switzerland)	1–3 (0–0, 1–2, 0–1)	(Switzerland) HC Davos	Eisstadion Davos

Game reference

Reto Berra
Goalies
Luca Hollenstein

	0–1	21:39 – Stránský (Nussbaumer, Andersson) (PP)
Sörensen (Kapla, De la Rose) (PP) – 30:13	1–1
	1–2	37:42 – Kessler (Stránský, Asplund)
	1–3	59:50 – Ryfors (Kessler, Dahlbeck) (EN)

8 min
Penalties
8 min
21
Shots
21

=== Final ===
31 December 2025; 12–10	U.S. Collegiate Selects (United States)	3–6 (1–2, 2–1, 0–3)	(Switzerland) HC Davos	Eisstadion Davos

Game reference

Adam Gajan
Goalies
Sandro Aeschlimann

	0–1	11:15 – Asplund (Corvi) (PP)
Walsh (Knuble) – 13:25	1–1
	1–2	14:49 – Tambellini (Frick)
Fink (Pohlkamp, Walsh) – 23:56	2–2
	2–3	31:03 – Tambellini (Corvi)
Musa (Fink, Hughes) – 33:42	3–3
	3–4	55:21 – Zadina (Andersson)
	3–5	56:48 – Corvi (Tambellini, Jung)
	3–6	57:49 – Stránský (Dahlbeck, Zadina) (PP, EA, EN)

8 min
Penalties
2 min
23
Shots
32

== All-Star Team ==
Position	Player	Team
Goaltender	(Switzerland) Reto Berra	(Switzerland) HC Fribourg-Gottéron
Defencemen	(Canada) Nikolas Brouillard	Team Canada
Defencemen	(Denmark) Oliver Larsen	(Finland) IFK Helsinki
Forwards	(Sweden) Marcus Sörensen	(Switzerland) HC Fribourg-Gottéron
Forwards	(Canada) Aiden Fink	(United States) U.S. Collegiate Selects
Forwards	(Czech Republic) Filip Zadina	(Switzerland) HC Davos

== Statistics ==
=== Scoring leaders ===
List shows the top eight skaters sorted by points.

Player	GP	G	A	Pts	+/−	PIM	POS
(United States) Aiden Fink	4	4	4	8	+4	4	F
(Sweden) Marcus Sorensen	3	4	2	6	+3	4	F
(Czech Republic) Matej Stransky	5	3	3	6	+3	0	F
(Czech Republic) Filip Chlapik	4	3	2	5	+0	4	F
(Czech Republic) Filip Zadina	5	3	2	5	+2	2	F
(United States) Quinn Finley	4	2	3	5	+0	4	F
(Sweden) Rasmus Asplund	5	2	3	5	+2	0	F
(Switzerland) Enzo Corvi	4	1	4	5	+2	0	F

Note: Pos = Position; GP = Games played; G = Goals; A = Assists; Pts = Points; PIM = Penalty minutes; +/- = Plus/minus; PPG = Power-play goals; SHG = Short-handed goals; GWG = Game-winning goals

=== Goaltending leaders ===
(minimum 40% team's total ice time)
