= Frozen Confines =

Outdoor hockey game in Chicago

- Venue: Wrigley Field in Chicago, Illinois
- Date: January 3–4, 2025
- Attendance: 50,497 (cumulative); 25,709 (Jan. 3); 24,788 (Jan. 4)

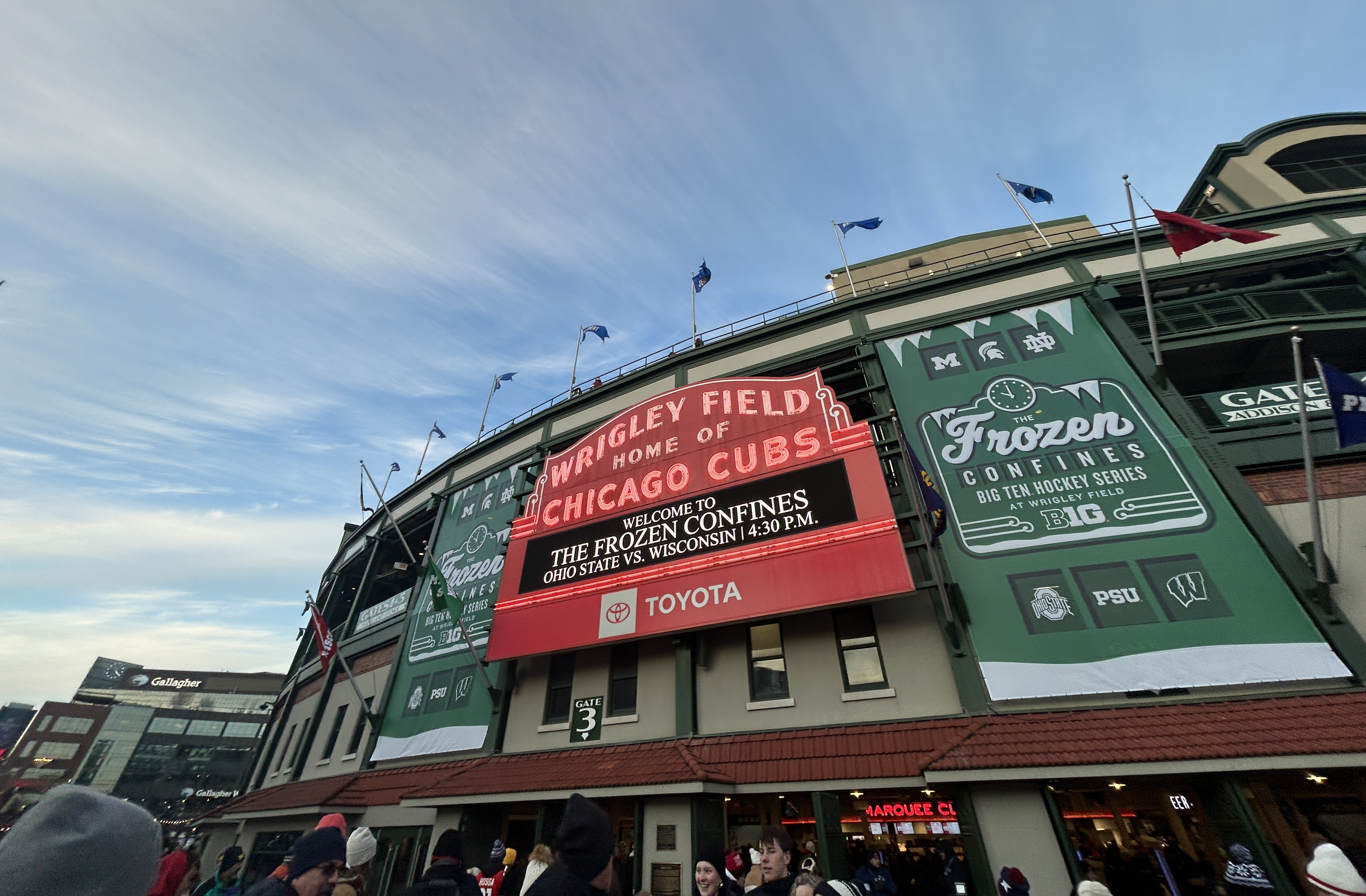
Wrigley Field marquee ahead of the start of play on the second day

The Frozen Confines was a series of outdoor college hockey games played at Wrigley Field in Chicago January 3–4, 2025. The event was held in conjunction with the 2025 NHL Winter Classic that had been played at the same stadium days earlier. Three men's games were played between programs of the Big Ten Conference (Michigan, Michigan State, Notre Dame, Ohio State, Penn State, and Wisconsin). One women's game was played between the Western Collegiate Hockey Association women's programs from two of the participating universities (the Ohio State and Wisconsin women's teams).

Each day of the event was ticketed as a double-header, with ticket holders having admission to both games on a given day. The two days of the Frozen Confines amassed a cumulative attendance of 50,497, with each day being attended by approximately 25,000 spectators.

== Background ==
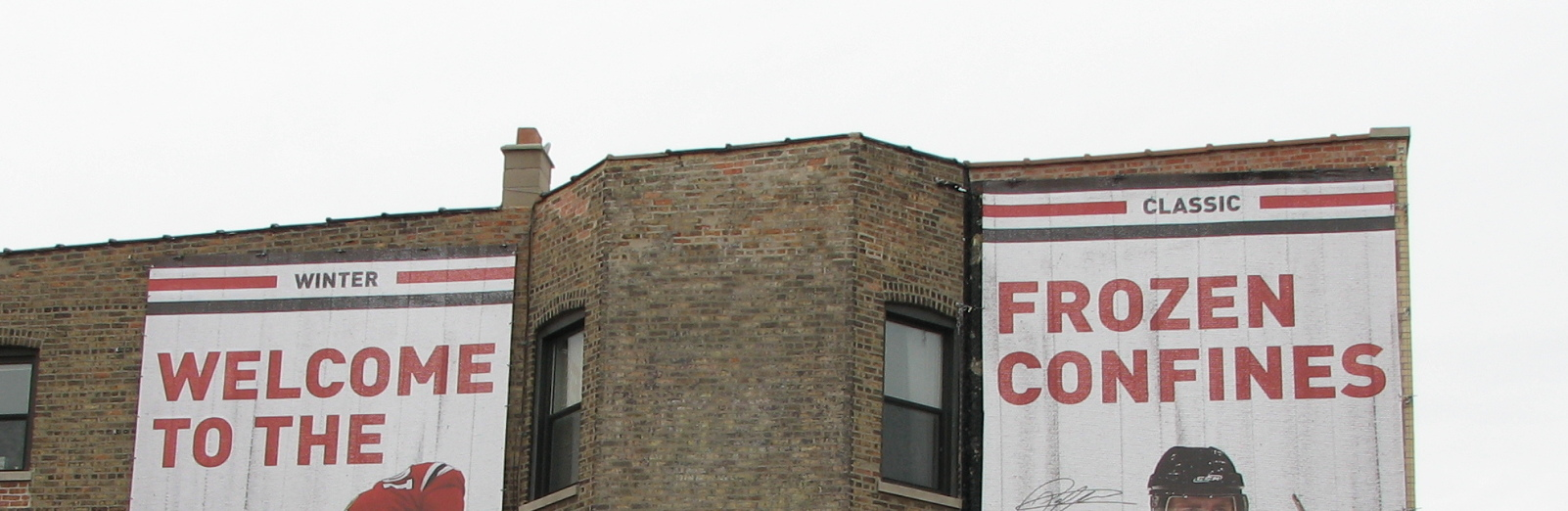
Sign in the Wrigleyville neighborhood ahead of the 2009 NHL Winter Classic similarly referring to ice hockey at Wrigley Field as "The Frozen Confines", which is a reference to Wrigley Field's "The Friendly Confines" nickname

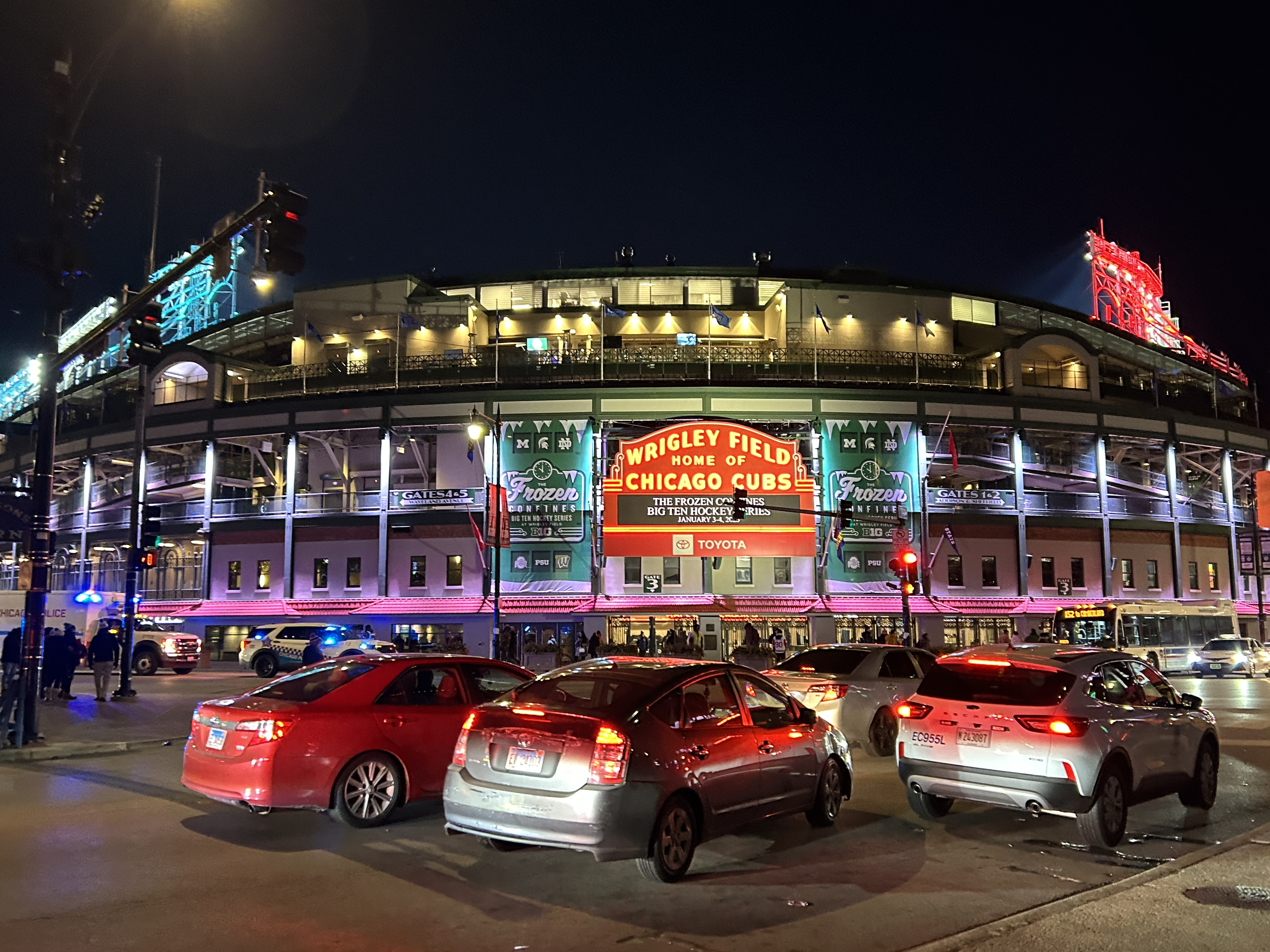
Wrigley Field, photographed after the conclusion of the final game

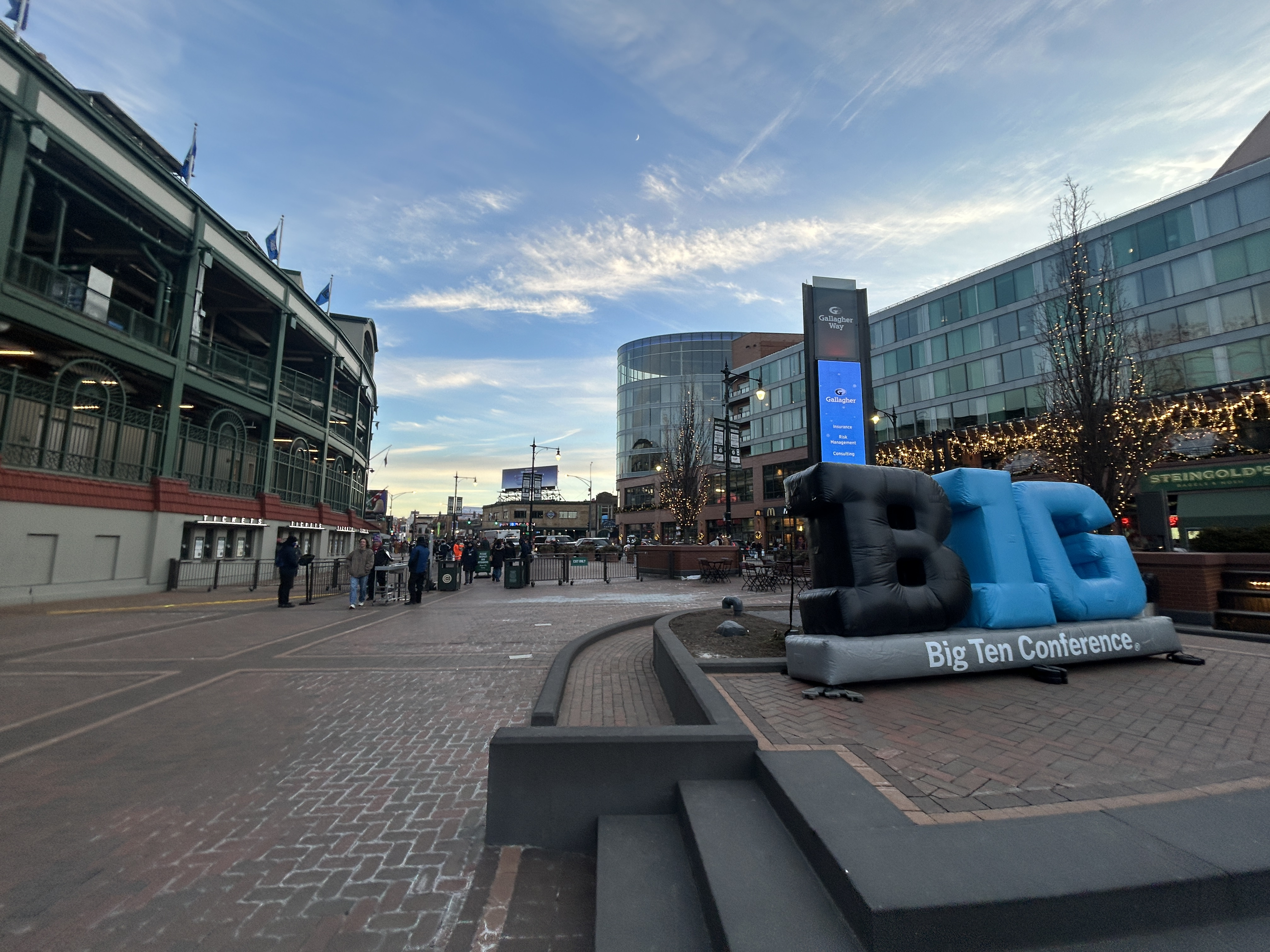
Big Ten Conference inflatable sculpture erected in Gallagher Way outside of Wrigley Field

On February 7, 2024, it was announced Wrigley Field (a Major League Baseball stadium that is the home venue of the Chicago Cubs) would host the NHL Winter Classic (an annual outdoor NHL game) the following season. Wrigley Field had previously been the site of the 2009 NHL Winter Classic. In August 2024, it was announced that the Big Ten Conference would organize an ice hockey event on the same ice as the Winter Classic, featuring most of its men's ice hockey teams as well as two women's programs from Big Ten schools.

The matches were the first college hockey matches to be held at Wrigley Field. The event's name was a derivative of Wrigley Field's nickname, "The Friendly Confines".

Since the Big Ten Conference has an odd-number of men's ice hockey teams (seven), one of the conference's teams (Minnesota) did not participate in the Frozen Confines.

While 67 collegiate outdoor ice hockey games had been played in the United States between 2001 and 2023, prior to the Frozen Confines it had been two years since any college hockey team had played an outdoor game.

=== Previous outdoor games featuring the participating teams ===
The event was:

- Michigan men's ninth appearance in an outdoor game
- Michigan State men's fifth appearance in an outdoor game
- Ohio State men's fifth appearance in an outdoor game
- Notre Dame men's fourth appearance in an outdoor game
- Wisconsin men's fourth appearance in an outdoor game
- Wisconsin women's second appearance in an outdoor game
- Ohio State women's first appearance in an outdoor game
- Penn State men's first appearance in an outdoor game

Previous outdoor games featuring the participating teams
Event			Team	Opponent played	Venue			Notes
Date	Event name	Photo	Team	Opponent played	Name	Location	Description	Notes
October 6, 2001	Cold War		Michigan men vs. Michigan State		Spartan Stadium	East Lansing, Michigan	College football stadium	First outdoor game appearances of both Michigan and Michigan State
February 11, 2006	Frozen Tundra Hockey Classic		Ohio State men's vs Wisconsin men's		Lambeau Field	Green Bay, Wisconsin	NFL professional football stadium	First outdoor game appearances of both Ohio State men's and Wisconsin men's
February 6, 2010	Camp Randall Hockey Classic		Michigan vs. Wisconsin men’s		Camp Randall Stadium	Madison, Wisconsin	College football stadium	Second outdoor game appearances of both Michigan and Wisconsin men's, first outdoor game appearance of Wisconsin women's
February 6, 2010	Camp Randall Hockey Classic		Wisconsin women’s	Bemidji State	Camp Randall Stadium	Madison, Wisconsin	College football stadium	Second outdoor game appearances of both Michigan and Wisconsin men's, first outdoor game appearance of Wisconsin women's
December 11, 2010	The Big Chill at the Big House		Michigan vs. Michigan State		Michigan Stadium	Ann Arbor, Michigan	College football stadium	Third outdoor game appearance of Michigan, second outdoor game appearance of Michigan State; set the all-time record for ice hockey attendance
January 15, 2012	The Frozen Diamond Faceoff		Michigan vs. Ohio State men's		Progressive Field	Cleveland, Ohio	MLB professional baseball stadium	Michigan's fourth outdoor game appearance, Ohio State men's second outdoor game appearance
February 17, 2013	OfficeMax Hockey City Classic		Notre Dame	Miami of Ohio	Soldier Field	Chicago, Illinois	NFL professional football stadium	Double-header; first outdoor game appearance of Notre Dame, third outdoor game appearance of Wisconsin men's
February 17, 2013	OfficeMax Hockey City Classic		Wisconsin men's	Minnesota	Soldier Field	Chicago, Illinois	NFL professional football stadium	Double-header; first outdoor game appearance of Notre Dame, third outdoor game appearance of Wisconsin men's
December 27, 2013	2013 Hockeytown Winter Festival/ Great Lakes Invitational		Michigan	Western Michigan	Comerica Park	Detroit, Michigan	MLB professional baseball stadium	Double header; fifth outdoor game appearance of Michigan, third outdoor game appearance of Michigan State; the 2013 Hockeytown Winter Festival was held in conjunction with the 2014 NHL Winter Classic at Michigan Stadium. On other days at Comerica Park, it featured other college games, an AHL professional hockey game, and a OHL major junior game.
December 27, 2013	2013 Hockeytown Winter Festival/ Great Lakes Invitational		Michigan State	Michigan Tech	Comerica Park	Detroit, Michigan	MLB professional baseball stadium	Double header; fifth outdoor game appearance of Michigan, third outdoor game appearance of Michigan State; the 2013 Hockeytown Winter Festival was held in conjunction with the 2014 NHL Winter Classic at Michigan Stadium. On other days at Comerica Park, it featured other college games, an AHL professional hockey game, and a OHL major junior game.
January 17, 2014	2014 OfficeMax Hockey City Classic		Ohio State men's	Minnesota	Huntington Bank Stadium	Minneapolis, Minnesota	College football stadium	Ohio State men's third outdoor game appearance; part of a double-header
January 4, 2014	Frozen Fenway 2014		Notre Dame	Boston College	Fenway Park	Boston, Massachusetts	MLB professional baseball stadium	Notre Dame's second outdoor game appearance; part of a double-header. Frozen Fenway 2014 featured further matches on other days as well.
February 7, 2015	2015 OfficeMax Hockey City Classic		Michigan vs. Michigan State		Soldier Field	Chicago, Illinois	NFL professional football stadium	Michigan's sixth outdoor game appearance, Michigan State's fourth outdoor game appearance; part of a double-header
January 5, 2019	Let's Take This Outside		Michigan vs. Notre Dame		Notre Dame Stadium	Notre Dame, Indiana	College football stadium	Michigan's seventh outdoor game appearance, Notre Dame's third outdoor game appearance; held in conjunction with the 2019 Winter Classic at the same venue
February 18, 2023	Faceoff on the Lake		Michigan vs. Ohio State men's		Huntington Bank Field	Cleveland, Ohio	NFL professional football stadium	Michigan's eighth outdoor game appearance; Ohio State men's fourth outdoor game appearance

== Alternate jerseys worn ==
Most teams wore special alternate jersey which took design cues from baseball jerseys. The exception was Michigan State, which opted to instead wear their usual white "home" jerseys for the games.

=== Michigan uniforms ===
Michigan players wore uniforms which took design cues from Chicago Cubs baseball uniforms of the 1980s. The jerseys took inspiration from road jerseys which the Chicago Cubs wore in the 1980s. The hockey jerseys were primarily yellow ("maize") and featured a navy blue version of the University of Michigan's "Block M" emblem on its left chest, placed similarly to where Cubs jerseys typically local a "C" logo. The jerseys featured a white collar with a navy blue trim. The right sleeves featured player numbers in navy blue (with white outlines) using the Chicago Cubs jersey font. This same font and color scheme was also used for the jersey numbers on the back of the jersey. Player names on the backs of the jerseys were also in navy blue with white outlines, and featured text which arched over the player number. The left sleeve featured a patch with the likeness of Biff, the Michigan Wolverine. The hockey socks worn by the school's players were primarily yellow, but featured navy blue panels on the front and the back meant to mimic the shape of Baseball stirrups. The right sleeve featured the player number (which was also included on the back of each jersey). The collars of the jerseys were typical of hockey jerseys. Michigan players also wore helmets with blue-and-yellow "winged" patterns. The hockey pants and gloves worn by their players were navy blue. The pants featured a yellow ("maize") "Block M" logo on the right leg. The jersey design was regarded to be unconventional for the sport of ice hockey.

=== Notre Dame uniforms ===
Notre Dame wore white jerseys that featured a depiction the school's leprechaun mascot inset inside of a C that resembles the Chicago Cubs logo. The sleeves took design cues from the flag of Chicago, while also featuring iconography associated with its university. The sleeves featured light two blue blue stripes and one white stripe, which that resembled the layout of the flag. Four golden shamrocks were located within the white stripe, resembling the placement of the four red stars that are featured on the flag of Chicago. The shoulers of the jerseys also featured gold-colored "ND" insignias. Player numbers were also included on the sleeves (for easier television-viewer identification of players), colored in light blue and outlined with a black and navy border.

=== Ohio State men's uniforms ===
Ohio State men’s look for their Wrigley Field matchup against fierce rivals Michigan borrows heavily from the school’s baseball team, with a script “Ohio State” logo across the chest and a player number underneath on the front of the jersey.

Like many of the other jersey designs, the Ohio State men's jerseys also were influenced by the school's baseball team's kit. The jersey featured an "Ohio State" script wordmark across its chest, with player numbers beneath. The main color of the jersey was a dark grey. The script and numbers on the front were white with red outlines. The numbers on the back were done in the same manner, but the player names were solid white without any outline. Each shoulder had a patch with a buckeye leaf inside of a circle. The same circular insignia was also located at the front of the collar, but was rendered at a smaller size there. The collars also featured a thin red trim. Red, white, and black stripes (similar to those featured on the school's football team jerseys) were included near waist-level on the torso and on the sleeves of the jersey.

Players wore grey hockey pants with a team logo on the right leg. Players also wore red gloves. They also wore predominantly grey stockings that featured a red, white, and grey striping matching those on the jersey sleeves and waist. The team wore their standard helmets, which resembled the school's football helmets (predominantly silver, featuring a red, white, and grey stripe down its center. Players sported Buckeye leaf merit stickers on their helmets. Player numbers were included on the front of the helmets.

=== Ohio State women's uniforms ===
The Ohio State women's team wore its own special alternate jersey, with a design unique from that worn by the men's team.

=== Penn State uniforms ===
Penn State wore navy bluejerseys which took minor design cues from the baseball jerseys of the Chicago Cubs and of Penn State Nittany Lions baseball. The jerseys' belly featured diagonally angled script reading "Nittany Lions", in reference to the design of the university baseball team's own alternate jerseys.The jersey referenced Cubs jerseys by using Cubs jersey fonts on its nameplates (which were arched), lettering, and numbers. The jerseys also featured rendered ivy leafs in reference to the famous ivy on Wrigley Field's outfield walls.

The jerseys also featured a white yoke on the shoulder, as a tribute to the jerseys previously worn by Penn State's club hockey teams in the 1950s. The sleeves had two broad white strips, in reference to the design of the jerseys worn by the 1979–80 Penn State Icers team. The waist of the jerseys featured a single white strip. The collars of the jersey were navy blue and white, with white laces at their front. The inside of the collar featured a white baseball stitching-inspired pattern set atop a navy blue background.

The shoulders of the jerseys also featured a "walking lion" logo, with the lion rendered atop a navy blue letter "S". This lion logo referenced the "walking bear" logo of the Chicago Cubs. Team captain Simon Mack's jersey featured a captain's "C" which was rendered using the leter-C team logo of the Cubs.

Goaltender Arsenii Sergeev wore a goaltender helmet which featured artwork containing ivy leaves and the aforementioned "walking lion" logo on its sides; with the logo of the Frozen Confines being rendered on the backside of the helmet.

The jerseys were paired with retro-colored gloves and pants which the Penn State team had already worn with their other alternative uniforms.

=== Wisconsin men's uniforms ===
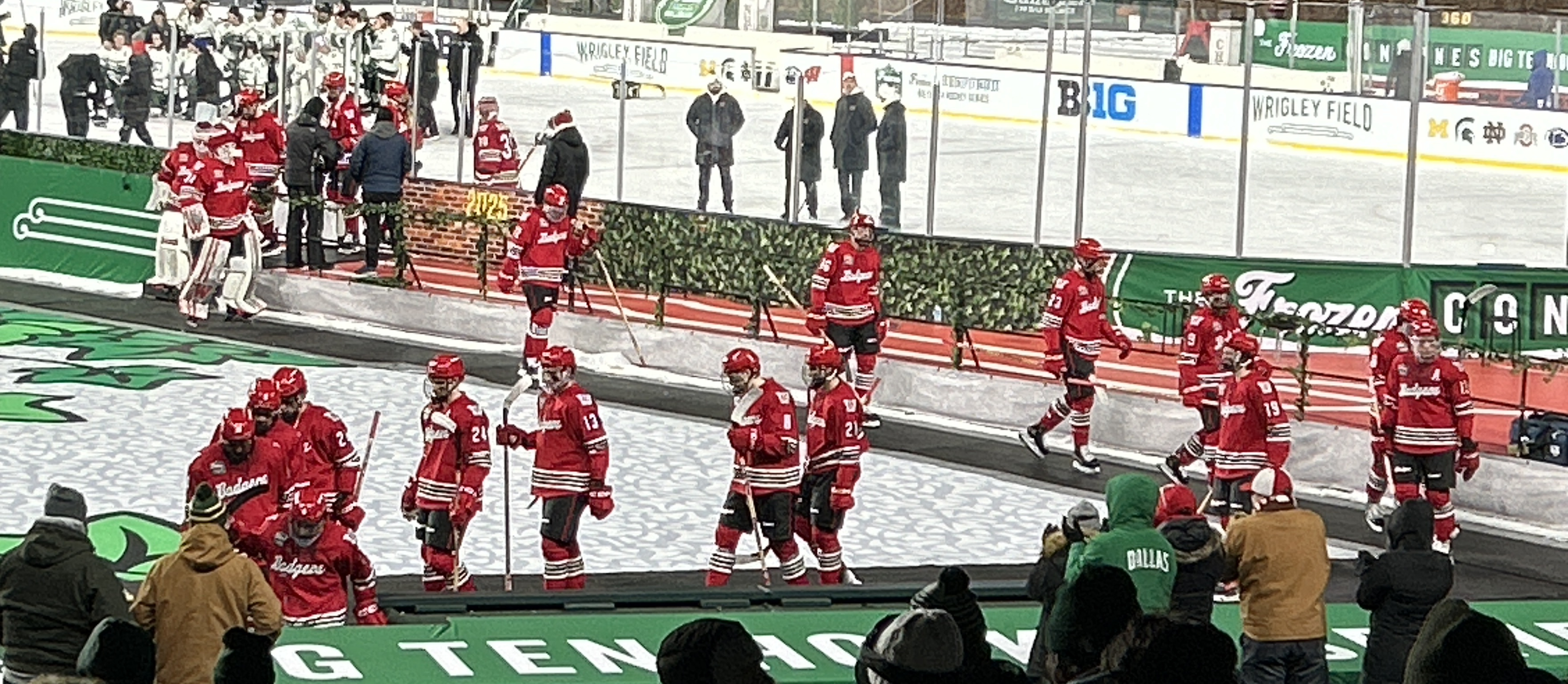
Wisconsin men's players at Wrigley Field

Wisconsin's men's team wore jerseys which featured "baseball-inspired font". The jersey sweater was red with the word "Badgers" adorning the chest in white script with a black outline. The jerseys did not feature a front-facing number. Instead, numbers were listed on the sleeves and the back, indicated in white block font outlined in black and accentuated by drop shadows. Player names were listed on the back of the sweaters in white serif block font. Four white stripes and three black stripes of equal width adorned each sleeve as well as the waist of the sweaters. The middlemost (black) stripe was bisected by an overlapping red pinstripe.

The jerseys were worn with black hockey pants, a difference from the red pants of the team's regular kit. The addition of black pants allowed the Badgers' kits to somewhat resemble the regular kit of the Chicago Blackhawks, which features black pants. The pants featured the same "Badgers" script as the jersey written on the red leg. Wisconsin men's players also wore red helmets, with the same "Badgers" script featured as a raised sticker. The players also wore red socks (which also featured the same striping pattern as the sleeves and waist of the jerseys. Completing the kit were red gloves.

The jerseys bore some familiarity to the jerseys once worn by the university's disbanded varsity baseball team.

=== Wisconsin women's uniforms ===
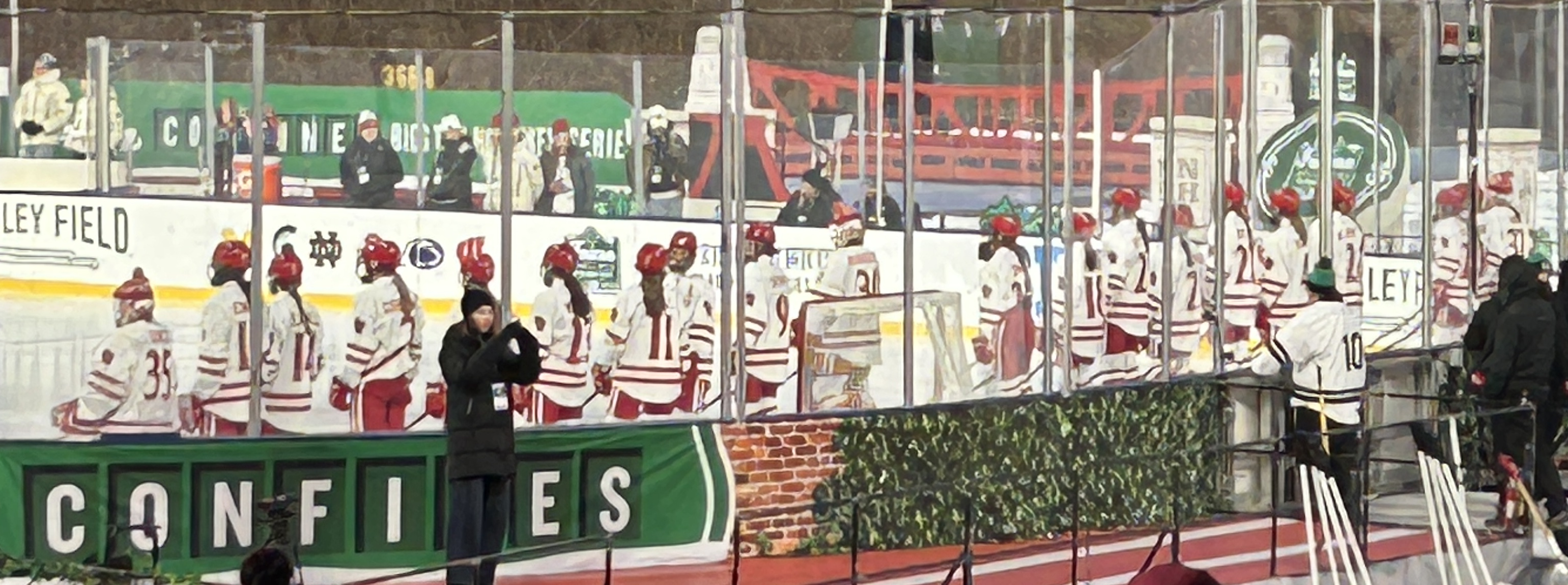
Wisconsin women's players at Wrigley Field

The Wisconsin women wore jerseys which featured "Wisconsin" written across their chest, which the program described as "a vintage look and a nod to historic Wisconsin jerseys." This also resembled the jerseys that had been previously worn by the university's baseball program prior to its discontinuance. The jerseys were white, with the "Wisconsin" written across the chest in a solid-red colored script. Below the script, on the front-facing side of the jersey, player numbers were listed in the same solid red color. The jerseys did not have sleeve numbers, instead having a sleeve patch in the shape of Wisconsin. The inclusion of the patch was described as allowing the team "to represent [its] home state [while playing] away from home". Player numbers were also listed on the back of the jerseys in the same font as on the front, and in a similar solid red. While same solid red were used for player names on the back of the jerseys, the font for the names was instead a serif block font. The two fonts used were each described to be themed to the games site at Wrigley Field. The jerseys featured to red stripes around its sleeves and along its waist. The jersey collar was white with a red trim, and also feature a red Under Armour logo on the front of it.

The kit featured white socks with the same pair of red stripes that were featured on parts of the jersey. The kit also featured red pants and red gloves.

== Logistics ==
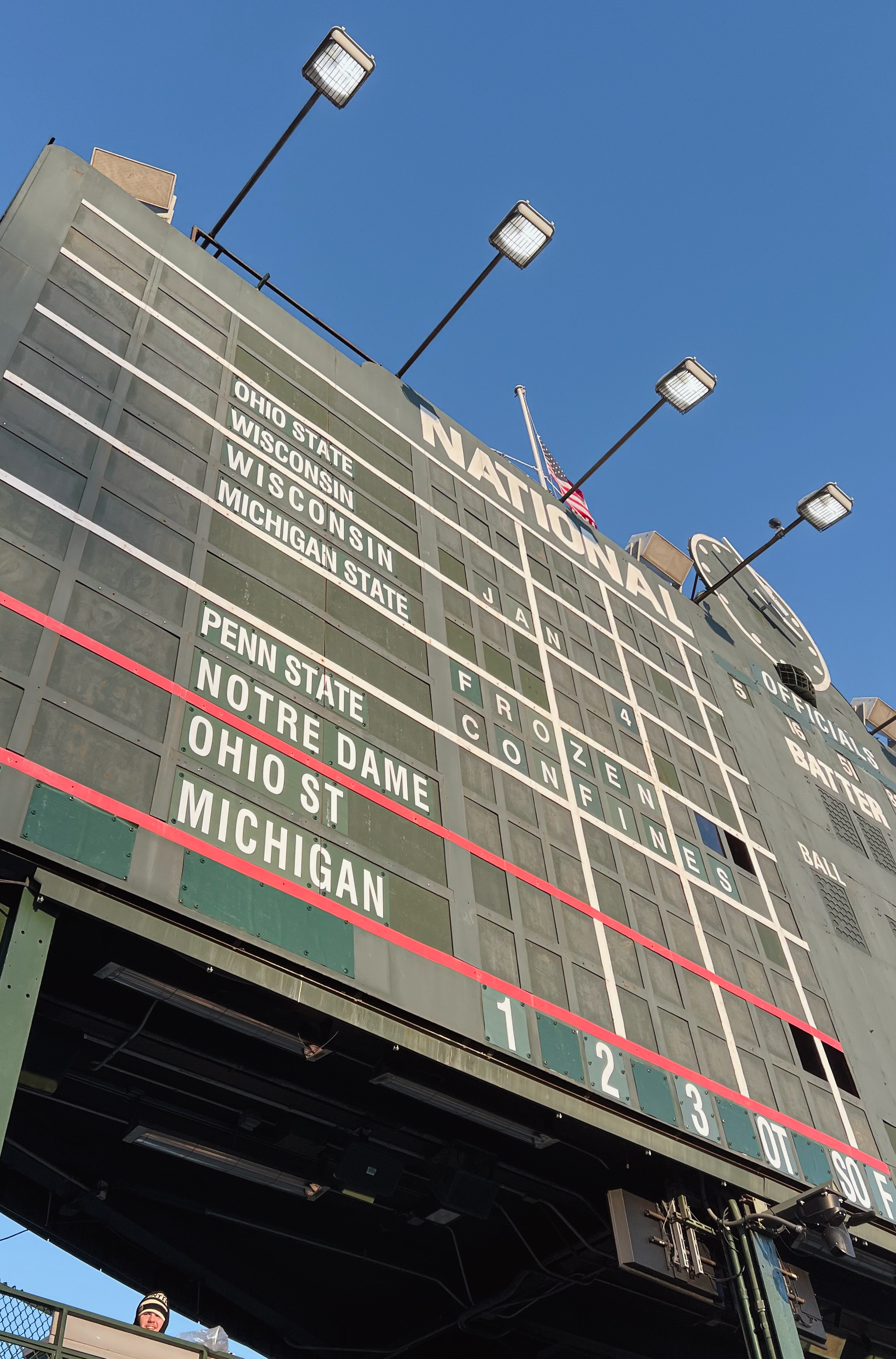
Wrigley Field's center field scoreboard set-up to display the January 3 scores

All of the games were aired on the Big Ten Network.

The event featured three Big Ten Hockey men's matchups, and one Western Collegiate Hockey Association (WCHA) women's matchup.

Concession stands at the game offered the sale of beer in hockey stick-shaped souvenir glasses.

=== Ticketing and attendance numbers ===
Each day of the event was ticketed as a double-header, with ticket holders having admission to both games on a given day.

The first game of each day began in the afternoon, and was followed by a night game.

Each day of the event saw attendance of approximately 25,000. The first day saw attendance of 25,709 and the second day saw attendance of 24,788, amassing a cumulative attendance of 50,497. On the first day, likely due in part to cold weather, significantly fewer spectators attended the second game compared to the first. Many left before or soon after the conclusion of the Michigan–Ohio State game.

=== Security ===
The games were held several days after the 2025 New Orleans truck attack. According to Alderman Brian K. Hopkins (chair of the Chicago City Council's Public Safety Committee), the attack in New Orleans motivated the City of Chicago government to implement additional security precautions during the games. This included placing a greater number of movable vehicle barriers in the area surrounding Wrigley Field than had been previously planned. The city had months earlier increased its stock of such barriers to accommodate the security logistics of the 2024 Democratic National Convention that was held in the city in August 2024.

=== Related festivities ===
In addition to the game, there were various related festivities in the Wrigleyville neighborhood. These included a pop-up exhibition dubbed "Getzky's Basement" in a building near the stadium, featuring various artifacts related to NHL great Wayne Gretzky's playing career. The exhibition was hosted by Greztky's son, Ty Gretzky.

On January 4, Sluggers Bar in Wrigleyville hosted an official pre-game event for Wisconsin fans.

=== Players absent due to 2025 World Junior Ice Hockey Championships ===
Due to the conflicting dates of the 2025 World Junior Ice Hockey Championships, four men's players were absent from men's teams rosters during the Frozen Confines in order to compete for the United States in the World Juniors: Michigan State's Trey Augustine; Notre Dame's Paul Fischer and Danny Nelson; and Wisconsin's Logan Hensler.

== Weather ==
The games took place as Chicago was impacted by a "deep freeze" winter weather pattern. The team benches featured heating, and CBS News Chicago (WBBM-TV) reported that fans in attendance had come dressed for such cold weather.

On January 3, the local temperature was 24 °F (−4 °C; 269 K) during the first game's opening face-off. Cold dry air at the stadium created a low wind chill. Local temperatures on January 4 were below-freezing temperatures, with weather conditions being described by ABC7 Chicago (WLS-TV) as "bitterly cold". The below-freezing temperatures impacted not only the game experience, but also the ice quality.

To equip players for the weather, team equipment staffs took care to bring thermal gear.

== Michigan vs. Ohio State men's (January 3, 2025) ==
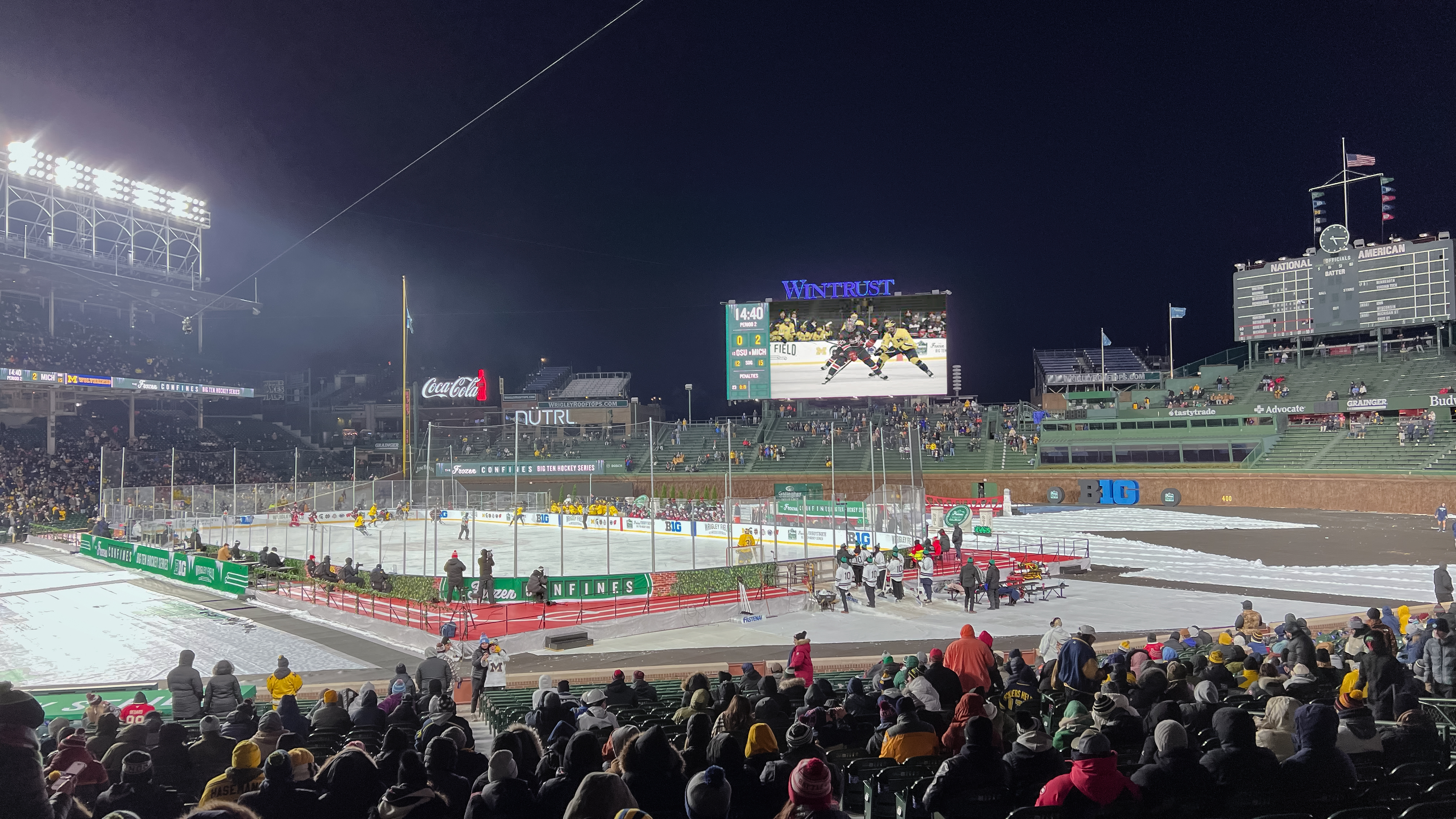
Stadium during the Michigan vs. Ohio State game

The game between the Michigan and Ohio State men's teams was scheduled as the first of a two-game series between the teams, with Michigan considered to be the "home" team. The second game of the series was played at Michigan's home rink, Yost Arena on January 5. Heading into the game, Michigan was ranked 9th nationally among NCAA men's programs, while Ohio State was ranked #13. Michigan and Ohio's hockey programs are regarded to have a strong rivalry.

Attendance during the game was in excess of 25,000.

Ahead of the game, a ceremonial puck drop was performed by former Michigan coach Red Berenson.

=== Game statistics ===
January 3, 2025	Michigan Wolverines	3–4	Ohio State Buckeyes (men's)	Wrigley Field	Recap

Scoring summary
Period	Team	Goal	Assist(s)	Time	Score
1st	MICH	Michael Hage		18:14	1–0 MICH
2nd	MICH	T.J. Hughes	Will Horcoff, Evan Werner	04:42 (power play)	2–01 MICH
2nd	OSU	Sam Deckhut	Noah Powell, Brent Johnson	12:56	2–1 MICH
2nd	OSU	Noah Powell	Chris Able	18:37	2–2 TIE
3rd	MICH	Will Horcoff	Michael Hage, T.J. Hughes	9:15 (power play)	3–2 MICH
3rd	OSU	Riley Thompson	Aiden Hansen-Bukata, Gunnarwolfe Fontaine	12:05 (power play)	3–3 TIE
3rd	OSU	Riley Thompson	Gunnarwolfe Fontaine, Davis Burnside	19:21.6 (power play)	4–3 OSU

Penalty summary
Period	Team	Player	Penalty	Time	PIM
2nd	OSU	Davis Burnside	Cross checking (minor)	3:19	2:00
2nd	MICH	Jacob Truscott	Cross checking (minor)	11:08	2:00
2nd	MICH	Hunter Hady	Elbowing (minor)	12:05	2:00
2nd	MICH	Mark Estapa	Cross checking (minor)	15:35	2:00
3rd	MICH	Will Horcoff	Slashing (minor)	2:50	2:00
3rd	OSU	Max Montes	Hooking (minor)	7:55	2:00
3rd	MICH	Mark Estapa	Face-off violation (minor)	11:48	2:00
3rd	MICH	Josh Ernisse	Hooking (minor)	18:52	2:00

Shots by period

Team	1	2	3	Total
Michigan				42
Ohio State				46

Power play opportunities

Team	Goals/Opportunities
Michigan	2/2
Ohio State	2/6

Goals by period

Team	1	2	3	Total
Michigan	1	1	1	3
Ohio State	0	2	2	4

Game stats by player (Michigan)

Player	POS	G	A	+/-	SH	PIM
Jacob Truscott	LD	0	0	0	1	2
Ethan Edwards	RD	0	0	-1	2	0
Kienan Draper	C	0	0	-2	0	0
Cameron Korpi	G	0	0	0	0	0
Philippe Lapointe	LW	0	0	0	2	0
Josh Eernisse	RW	0	0	0	1	2
T. J. Hughes	C	1	1	0	4	0
Michael Hage	C	1	1	1	7	0
Garrett Schifsky	LW	0	0	0	2	0
Mark Estapa	C	0	0	-1	1	4
Will Felicio	XD	0	0	-1	1	0
Hunter Hady	RD	0	0	-1	0	2
Evan Werner	RW	0	1	0	2	0
Josh Orrico	RD	0	0	0	0	0
Luca Fantilli	LD	0	0	0	0	0
William Whitelaw	RW	0	0	-1	1	0
Nick Moldenhauer	RW	0	0	0	0	0
Will Horcoff	LW	1	1	0	4	2
Jackson Hallum	LW	0	0	0	5	0
Dakoda Rheaume-Mullen	LD	0	0	1	1	0
Total		3	4	-5	34	12

Game stats by player (Ohio)

Player	POS	G	A	+/-	SH	PIM
Riley Thompson	C	2	0	0	8	0
Nathan McBrayer	LD	0	0	1	0	0
Chris Able	RD	0	1	1	0	0
Gunnarwolfe Fontaine	LW	0	2	0	3	0
Kristoffer Eberly	G	0	0	0	0	0
Davis Burnside	RW	0	1	0	2	2
James Hong	LW	0	0	0	1	0
Noah Powell	XF	1	1	2	3	0
Max Montes	C	0	0	1	1	2
Jake Rozzi	LW	0	0	-1	1	0
Brent Johnson	RD	0	1	1	0	0
Aiden Hansen-Bukata	RD	0	1	-1	4	0
Joe Dunlap	RW	0	0	-1	2	0
William Smith	LD	0	0	1	0	0
Ryan Gordon	RW	0	0	1	4	0
Sam Deckhut	C	1	0	2	1	0
Thomas Weis	RW	0	0	0	0	0
Jake Dunlap	LW	0	0	0	1	0
Patrick Guzzo	C	0	0	-1	0	0
Damien Carfagna	LD	0	0	-1	3	0
Total		4	7	5	34	4

=== Game synopsis ===
The game marked the collegiate hockey debut of Michigan's Will Horcoff (photographed at a game later that month)

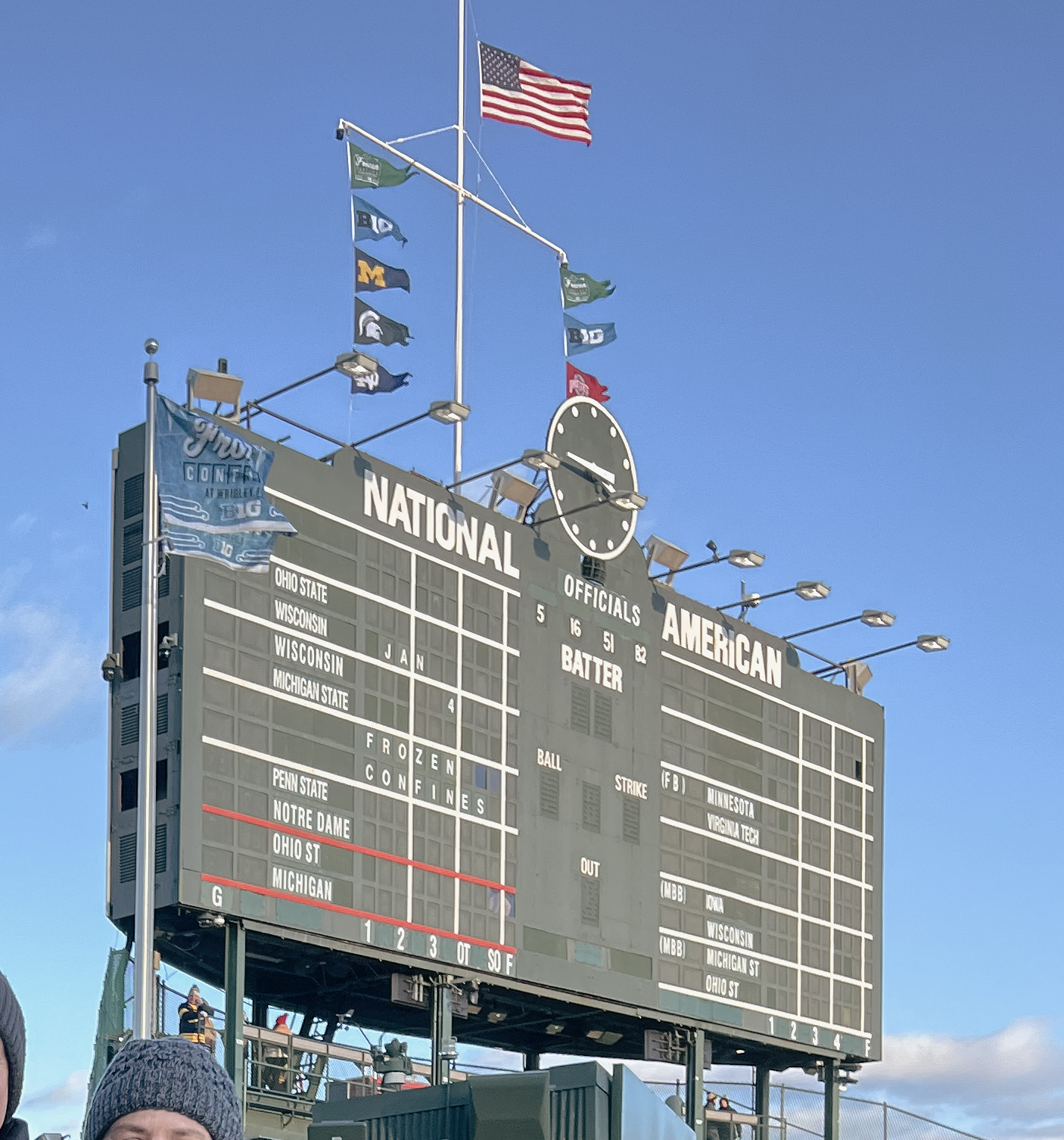
Wrigley Field's center field scoreboard before the January 3 games

Michigan freshman Will Horcoff made his collegiate hockey debut in the game, and recorded a goal and an assist.

In the third period, Michigan freshman Horcoff scored his first collegiate hockey goal during a power play for his team, giving his team a 3–2 lead. However, Ohio State took advantage of a power play in their favor (courtesy of an two minute penalty for an unusual faceoff violation call on Michigan's Mark Estapa for a hand pass directly off a face-off) to tie the game with a goal by Riley Thompson. Thompson then scored again, making what proved to be a game-winning goal with only 38 seconds remaining in regulation play.

Ohio State's Riley Thompson scored the game-winning-goal with only 38 seconds remaining in regulation play.

== Notre Dame vs. Penn State men's (January 3, 2025) ==
=== Game statistics ===
January 3, 2025	Penn State Nittany Lions (men's)	3–3	Notre Dame Fighting Irish (men's)	Wrigley Field	Recap

Scoring summary
Period	Team	Goal	Assist(s)	Time	Score
1st	N DAME	Grant Silianoff	Jack Larrigan, Zach Lucinski	7:29	1–0 N DAME
1st	PENNST	Tyler Paquette	Keaton Peters	8:25	1–1 TIE
1st	N DAME	Justin Janicke	Blake Biondi, Cole Knuble	19:19	2–1 N DAME
2nd	PENNST	Matt Dimarsico	Charlie Cerrato, Aiden Fink	19:28	2–2 TIE
3rd	PENNST	Aiden Fink	Dane Dowiak	00:10	3–2 PENNST
3rd	N DAME	Carter Slaggert	Grant Silianoff, Jack Larrigan	11:02	3–3 TIE
OT	—N/a				3–3 TIE
2OT	—N/a				3–3 TIE
SO	N DAME	Ryan Helliwell	—N/a		(Note: for NCAA's official record, the game ended as a 3–3 tie. For Big Ten tournament seeding purposes, the game was won by Notre Dame 4–3)

Power play opportunities

Team	Goals/Opportunities
Penn State	0/2
Notre Dame	0/2

Goals by period

Team	1	2	3	OT	2OT	Total (NCAA)	SO*	Total (Big Ten)
Penn State	1	1	1	0	0	3 (tie)	0	3
Notre Dame	2	0	1	0	0	3 (tie)	1	4

Game stats by player (Penn State)

Player	POS	G	A	+/-	SH	PIM
Cade Christenson	LD	0	0	0	1	0
Reese Laubach	C	0	0	1	4	0
Aiden Fink	RW	1	1	2	2	0
Arsenii Sergeev	G	0	1	0	0	0
Dane Dowiak	LW	0	1	1	3	0
Simon Mack	RD	0	0	1	1	0
Tyler Paquette	RW	1	0	0	2	0
Nick Fascia	LD	0	0	0	0	0
Charlie Cerrato	C	0	1	0	4	0
Dylan Lugris	RW	0	0	0	0	0
Ben Schoen	C	0	0	0	0	0
Danny Dzhaniyev	LW	0	0	0	4	0
Matt Dimarsico	LW	1	0	0	5	0
Jimmy Dowd Jr.	RD	0	0	0	2	0
Carson Dyck	XF	0	0	0	0	0
Carter Schade	LD	0	0	0	4	2
Casey Aman	RD	0	0	1	3	0
JJ Wiebusch	RW	0	0	-1	4	0
Alex Servagno	LW	0	0	0	0	2
Keaton Peters	C	0	1	0	3	0
Total		3	5	5	42	4

Game stats by player (Notre Dame)

Player	POS	G	A	+/-	SH	PIM
Nicholas Kempf	G	0	0	0	0	0
Cole Knuble	C	0	0	-2	4	0
Axel Kumlin	LD	0	0	-2	3	0
Michael Mastrodomenico	RD	0	0	-3	8	0
Blake Biondi	RW	0	1	-2	4	0
Justin Janicke	LW	1	0	-2	3	0
Henry Nelson	LD	0	0	1	4	0
Hunter Strand	C	0	0	0	5	0
Jayden Davis	C	0	0	-1	0	2
Brennan Ali	LW	0	1	0	4	0
Maddox Fleming	RW	0	0	0	0	0
Ryan Helliwell	LD	0	0	0	0	0
Jack Larrigan	RW	0	2	2	1	0
Jimmy Jurcev	RD	0	0	0	1	2
Zach Plucinski	RD	0	1	2	1	0
Grant Silianoff	LW	1	1	2	3	0
Ian Murphy	RW	0	0	-1	2	0
Carter Slaggert	C	1	0	2	2	0
Tyler Carpenter	LW	0	0	-1	1	0

Goaltender statistics

Goaltender	Team	Mins	Saves	GA
Arsenii Sergeev	PENNST	65	43	3 (NCAA)

Further statistics

Statistic	Penn State	Notre Dame
Faceoffs won	45	33
Short-handed goals	0	0
Penalty shot attempts/goals	1	1
Blocked shots	10	10
Infractions	2	0
Penalty minutes	4	4
Minor penalties	2	2
Major penalties	0	0
Misconduct (10 mins)	0	0
Game Misconduct	0	0
Gross Misconduct	0	0
Match penalty	0	0
Shootout goals	1	2
Empty net goals	0	0
Unassisted goals	0	0

=== Game synopsis ===
Before the game, Penn State players warmed up by tossing a football on the field, and Notre Dame players warmed up by playing catch with a baseball and baseball mitts (while Michigan and Ohio State were still playing).

A shootout was held for the purposes of awarding one team an additional point in conference rankings. Notre Dame won the shootout after eight rounds, with Ryan Helliwell scoring the winning shootout goal.

Penn State goaltender Arsenii Sergeev would be named one the Big Ten first star of the week.

== Ohio State vs. Wisconsin women's (January 4, 2025) ==
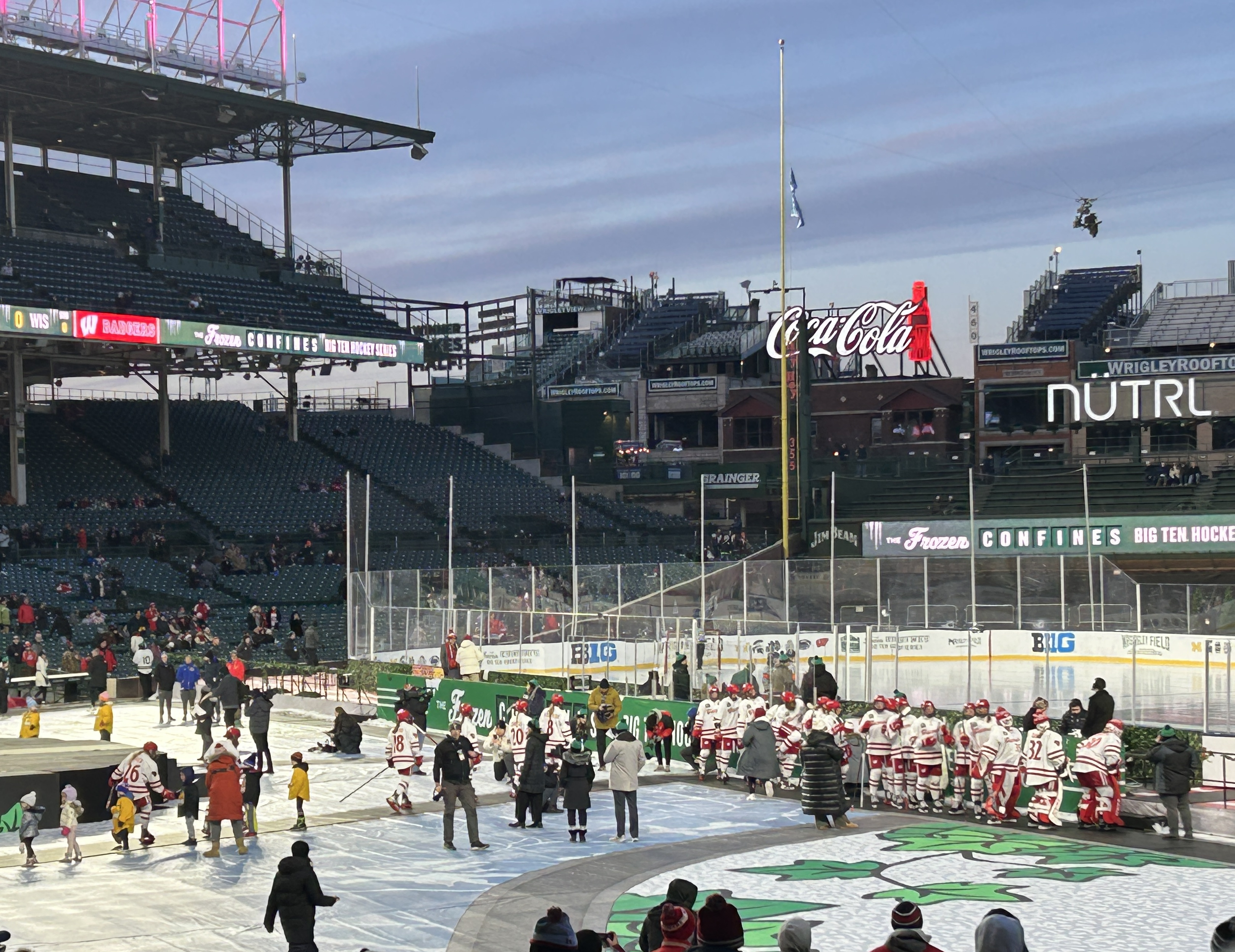
Wisconsin women's players enter the ice for their game

Wisconsin entered the game ranked #1 among NCAA Division I women's programs, while Ohio State entered the game ranked #2. The two teams had faced each-other in the two most recent national championship games (2023 and 2024). The game began at approximately 4:30pm central time. The game was the second of a series between Wisconsin and Ohio State's women's team, considered a "home" series for Wisconsin's team. The first game had been played January 1 at Wisconsin's LaBahn Arena. In the first game of their series, held two days prior, Wisconsin had shutout Ohio 6–0.

The game began at approximately 4:30 pm local time. Attendance for the game was nearly 25,000; with the crowd being described as having a larger share of Wisconsin fans than Ohio fans.

=== Game statistics ===
January 4, 2025	Ohio State Buckeyes (women's)	3–3	Wisconsin Badgers (women's)	Wrigley Field	Recap

Scoring summary
Period	Team	Goal	Assist(s)	Time	Score
1st	OHIOST	Jordyn Petrie	Joy Dunne, Emma Peschel	0:49	1–0 OHIOST
1st	WISC	Caroline Harvey	Kirsten Simms, Casey O'Brien	5:52	1–1 WISC
1st	WISC	Kirsten Simms	unassisted	10:01	2–1 WISC
2nd	OHIOST	Makenna Webster	Jocelyn Amos	18:20	2–2 TIE
3rd	OHIOST	Joy Dunne	Jenna Buglioni, Joryn Petrie	02:38	3–2 OHIOST
3rd	WISC	Kelly Gorbatenko	Laney Potter, Ava Murphy	14:17	3–3 TIE
OT	—N/a				3–3 TIE
SO	OHIOST	Jenna Buglioni	shootout	—N/a	

=== Three stars ===
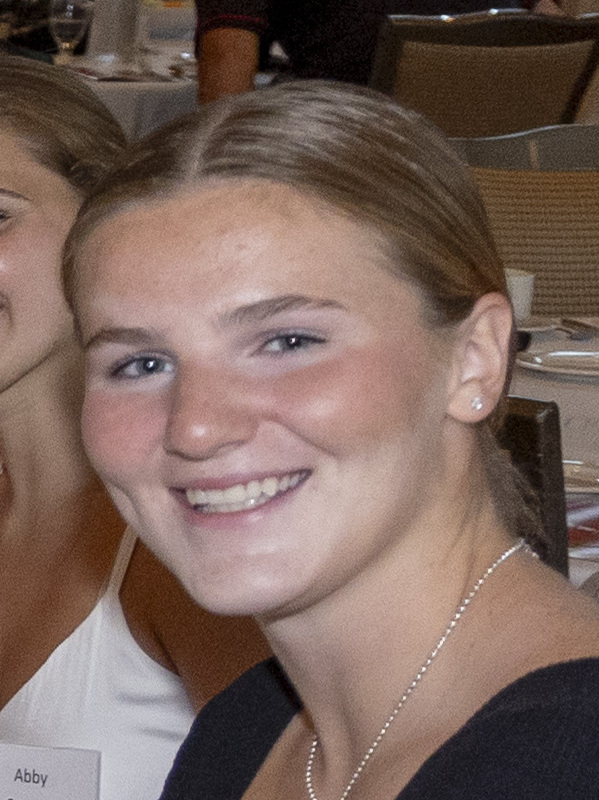
Wisconsin goaltender Ava McNaughton (pictured) was named the third star of the women's match

Named as the three stars were:

- 1st: Jenna Buglioni (Ohio State)
- 2nd: Amanda Theile (Ohio State)
- 3rd: Ava McNaughton (goaltender, Wisconsin)

=== Game synopsis ===
The women's match saw a tight contest between two of the nation's top women's teams. However, the third period saw a number of costly mistakes by Wisconsin, including one which allowed a goal by Penn State early in the period, as well as several penalties for Wisconsin.

The gam officially ended as a tie; however shootout was held for the purposes of awarding one team an additional point in conference rankings. Ohio State won the shootout after seven rounds.

== Michigan State vs. Wisconsin men's (January 4, 2025) ==
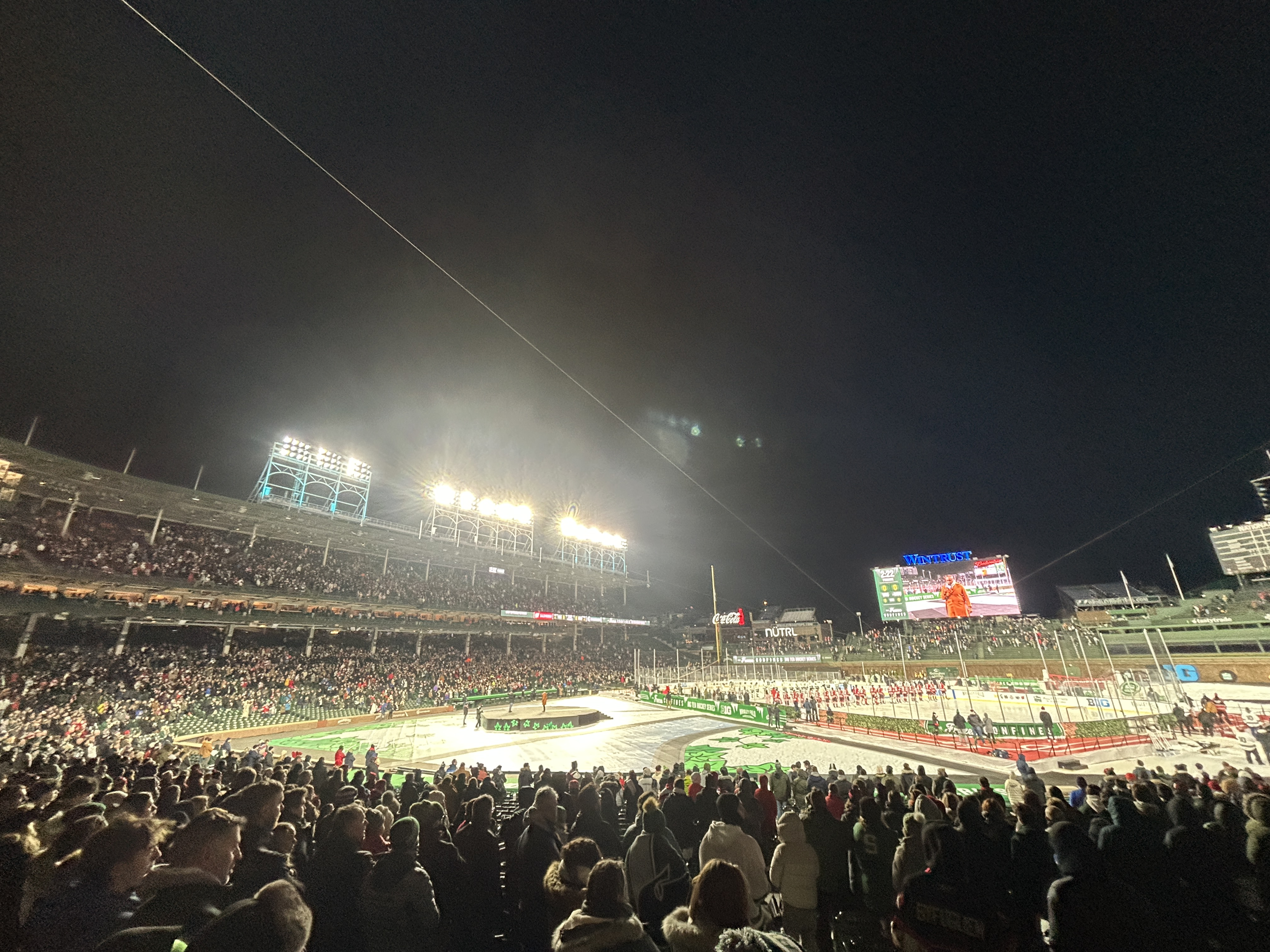
The Star Spangled Banner being performed before the start of the Michigan State vs. Wisconsin game

Michigan State entered the game as the #1 ranked team in the NCAA, while Wisconsin was unranked. Michigan State was regarded to be the "home" team.

The game was the second of a two-game series, the first game of which had been played January 2 at Munn Ice Arena in Lansing, Michigan.

The game began at approximately 8pm central time. Since Michigan State's starting goaltender, Trey Augustine, was competing for the United States in the World Junior Championships, Luca Di Pasquo played goaltender for the team.

While both teams had previously played outdoor games, this marked the first such game which Wisconsin had played in a baseball venue. Since Wisconsin men had won their previous outdoor game appearances, and ultimately marked Wisconsin's first loss in an outdoor game.

=== Game statistics ===
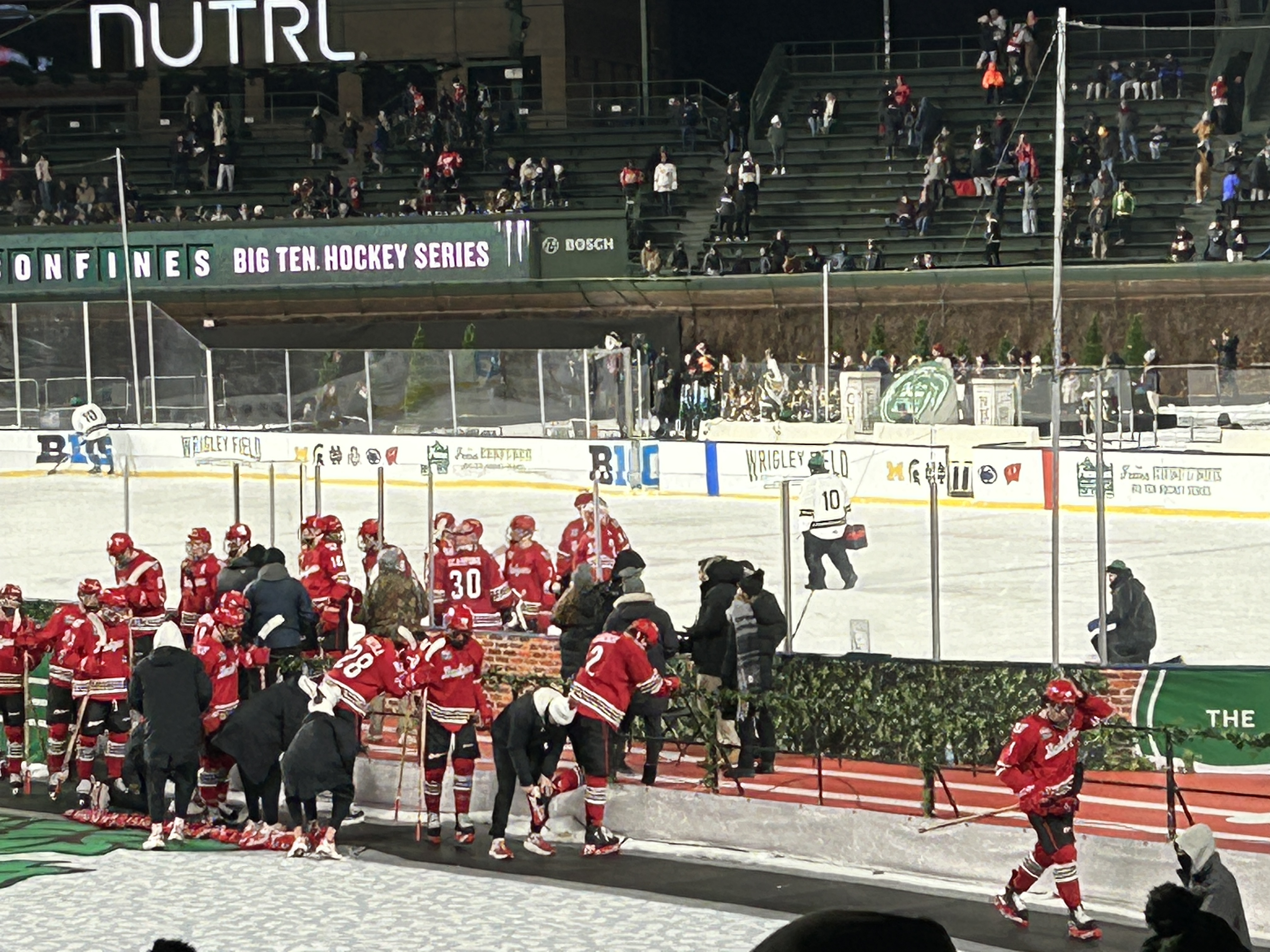
Wisconsin players departing the ice at the end of a period

January 4, 2025	Michigan State (men's)	4–3	Wisconsin Badgers (men's)	Wrigley Field	Recap

Scoring summary
Period	Team	Goal	Assist(s)	Time	Score
1st	MSU	Vladislav Lukashevich		15:36	1–0 MSU
2nd	MSU	Daniel Russell	Austin Oravetz, Isaac Howard	4:29	2–0 MSU
2nd	WISC	Gavin Morrissey	Anthony Keherer	10:17	2–1 MSU
2nd	WISC	Quinn Finley	Joe Palodichuk, Ryland Mosley	14:35	2–2 TIE
3rd	MSU	Isaac Howard	Daniel Russell, Matt Basgall	7:32	3–2 MSU
3rd	WISC	Ryland Mosely	Quinn Finley, Ben Dexheimer	19:12	3–3 TIE
OT	MSU	Daniel Russell	Nicklas Andrews, Isaac Howard	4:59	4–3 MSU

=== Game synopsis ===
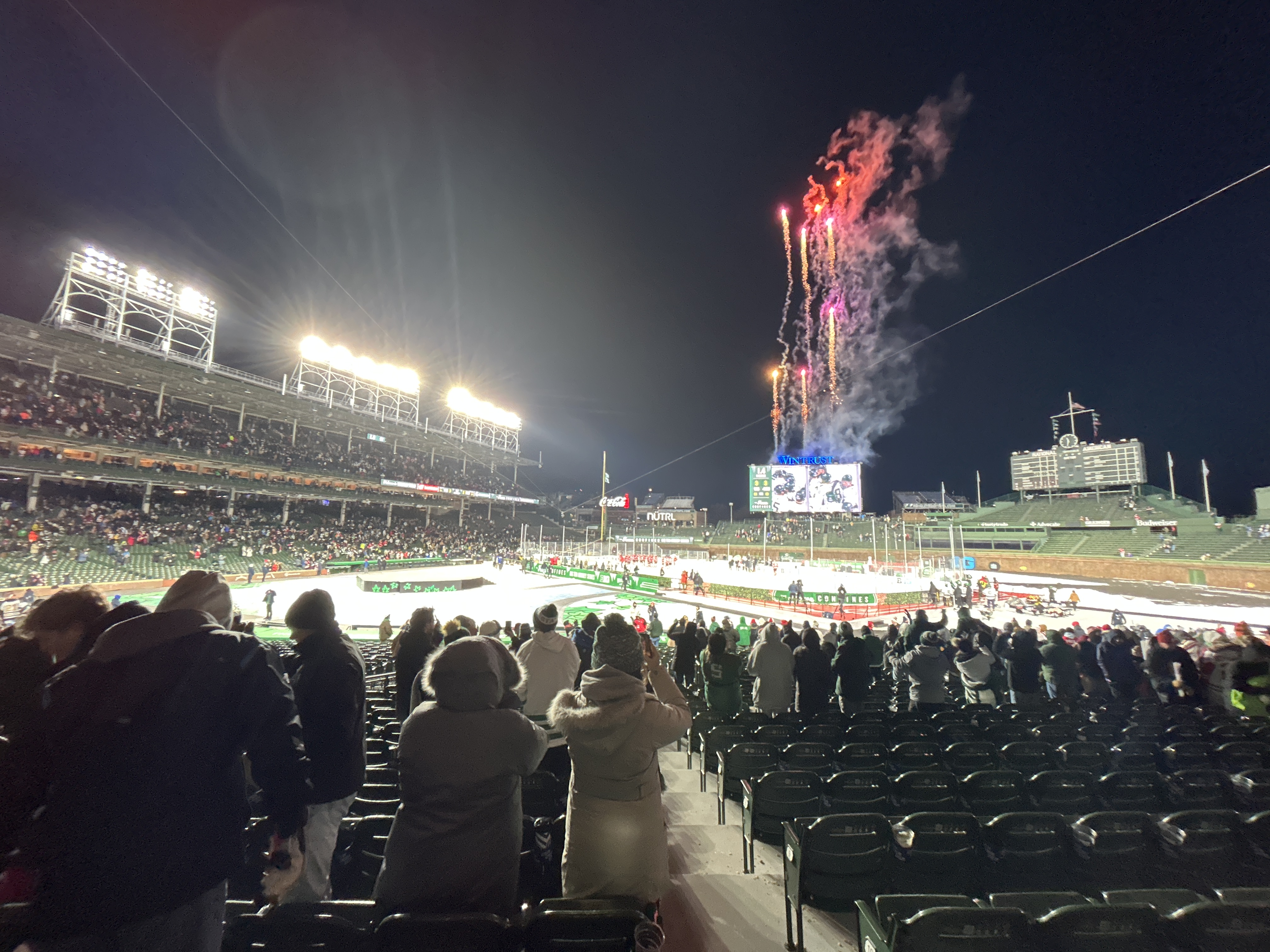
fireworks after the final goal

Michigan's Daniel Russell scored the game-winning goal with only a single second remaining in overtime.

Michigan State players Daniel Russell and Isaac Howard were named the Big Ten second and third stars of the week.
