= Michigan–Ohio State men's ice hockey rivalry =

College sports rivalry

- Michigan Wolverines Ohio State Buckeyes
- First meeting: February 8, 1964; Michigan 21, Ohio State 0
- Latest meeting: November 1, 2026; Michigan 5, Ohio State 4^{OT}
- Next meeting: January 22, 2027

Statistics
- Total meetings: 174
- All-time series: Michigan leads, 105–53–16
- Largest victory: Michigan, 21–0 (1964)
- Longest win streak: Michigan, 22 (1990–1995)
- Longest unbeaten streak: Michigan, 34 (1990–1998)
- Current win streak: Michigan, 1 (2026–present)

Locations of Michigan and Ohio State

The Michigan–Ohio State men's ice hockey rivalry is a college ice hockey rivalry between Michigan Wolverines men's ice hockey and Ohio State Buckeyes men's ice hockey that is part of the larger rivalry between the University of Michigan and Ohio State University. The rivalry between the Wolverines and Buckeyes notably includes the football and basketball rivalries.

== History ==
Michigan currently leads the series, which began on February 8, 1964, 104–52–16, as of the end of the 2025–26 season. The regular home arenas for the teams are Yost Ice Arena and Value City Arena. As of the 2012–13 season, both teams are members of the Big Ten Conference, although they have previously competed together in the Central Collegiate Hockey Association (CCHA) (1981–2013). From 1990–1995, the Wolverines won 22 straight matchups over the Buckeyes, the longest winning streak of the rivalry. The two schools play at least four times a year through conference play. On November 22, 2025, Michigan earned their 100th win in the rivalry. The teams have met four times in the Big Ten tournament, including once during the championship game in 2026, which Michigan won.

The most notable examples of the hockey rivalry are two outdoor games, the Faceoff on the Lake, held on February 18, 2023, at FirstEnergy Stadium in Cleveland. The attendance of 45,523 set a record for an outdoor college hockey game held at a neutral site. The most recent outdoor game was held on January 3, 2025, during the Frozen Confines at Wrigley Field in Chicago.

== Game results ==
Full game results for the rivalry.

Michigan victories	Ohio State victories	Tie games

No.	Date	Location	Winner	Score
1	1964	Columbus, OH	Michigan	21–0
2	1969	Ann Arbor, MI	Michigan	7–2
3	1974	Ann Arbor, MI	Michigan	7–1
4	1974	Ann Arbor, MI	Michigan	4–2
5	1978	Detroit, MI	Ohio State	5–4
6	1981	Ann Arbor, MI	Ohio State	4–3
7	1981	Ann Arbor, MI	Michigan	7–3
8	1982	Columbus, OH	Ohio State	3–1
9	1982	Columbus, OH	Michigan	4–1
10	1982	Ann Arbor, MI	Ohio State	5–4
11	1982	Ann Arbor, MI	Michigan	5–4
12	1983	Columbus, OH	Ohio State	9–1
13	1983	Columbus, OH	Ohio State	6–4
14	1984	Ann Arbor, MI	Tie	4–4
15	1982	Ann Arbor, MI	Ohio State	4–3^{OT}
16	1985	Columbus, OH	Michigan	4–1
17	1985	Columbus, OH	Michigan	6–4
18	1985	Columbus, OH	Ohio State	4–2
19	1985	Columbus, OH	Ohio State	6–5
20	1986	Ann Arbor, MI	Ohio State	6–4
21	1986	Ann Arbor, MI	Ohio State	8–6
22	1986	Ann Arbor, MI	Michigan	8–2
23	1986	Ann Arbor, MI	Ohio State	4–3^{OT}
24	1987	Columbus, OH	Ohio State	7–4
25	1987	Columbus, OH	Michigan	8–7^{OT}
26	1987	Columbus, OH	Michigan	5–3
27	1987	Columbus, OH	Ohio State	6–3
28	1988	Ann Arbor, MI	Michigan	6–5^{OT}
29	1988	Ann Arbor, MI	Ohio State	7–6
30	1988	Ann Arbor, MI	Tie	4–4

No.	Date	Location	Winner	Score
31	1988	Ann Arbor, MI	Ohio State	2–1
32	1989	Columbus, OH	Michigan	5–4
33	1989	Columbus, OH	Michigan	7–3
34	1989	Ann Arbor, MI	Ohio State	6–3
35	1989	Columbus, OH	Ohio State	7–3
36	1990	Columbus, OH	Tie	6–6
37	1990	Ann Arbor, MI	Tie	3–3
38	1990	Ann Arbor, MI	Tie	5–5
39	1990	Ann Arbor, MI	Michigan	9–1
40	1991	Columbus, OH	Michigan	8–2
41	1991	Columbus, OH	Michigan	4–2
42	1991	Ann Arbor, MI	Michigan	5–4
43	1991	Ann Arbor, MI	Michigan	9–4
44	1991	Ann Arbor, MI	Michigan	9–3
45	1992	Columbus, OH	Michigan	4–2
46	1992	Ann Arbor, MI	Michigan	9–2
47	1992	Columbus, OH	Michigan	3–2
48	1992	Ann Arbor, MI	Michigan	4–2
49	1992	Ann Arbor, MI	Michigan	9–4
50	1993	Ann Arbor, MI	Michigan	5–1
51	1993	Columbus, OH	Michigan	10–1
52	1993	Columbus, OH	Michigan	13–1
53	1993	Ann Arbor, MI	Michigan	4–3
54	1993	Ann Arbor, MI	Michigan	5–1
55	1994	Columbus, OH	Michigan	5–1
56	1994	Ann Arbor, MI	Michigan	10–2
57	1994	Columbus, OH	Michigan	7–2
58	1995	Columbus, OH	Michigan	10–2
59	1995	Ann Arbor, MI	Michigan	7–2
60	1995	Ann Arbor, MI	Michigan	4–0

No.	Date	Location	Winner	Score
61	1996	Columbus, OH	Tie	4–4
62	1996	Ann Arbor, MI	No. 5 Michigan	7–0
63	1996	Ann Arbor, MI	Tie	2–2
64	1996	Ann Arbor, MI	No. 2 Michigan	7–2
65	1997	Columbus, OH	No. 1 Michigan	6–1
66	1997	Columbus, OH	No. 1 Michigan	7–4
67	1997	Columbus, OH	Michigan	3–2^{OT}
68	1998	Ann Arbor, MI	No. 7 Michigan	4–2
69	1998	Ann Arbor, MI	No. 3 Michigan	6–0
70	1998	Detroit, MI	No. 8 Ohio State	4–2
71	1999	Columbus, OH	Ohio State	1–0
72	1999	Columbus, OH	Tie	1–1
73	1999	Ann Arbor, MI	Ohio State	3–2
74	1999	Detroit, MI	No. 8 Michigan	3–2
75	1999	Ann Arbor, MI	No. 5 Michigan	6–1
76	1999	Columbus, OH	No. 5 Michigan	8–4
77	2000	Columbus, OH	No. 4 Michigan	6–4
78	2000	Ann Arbor, MI	Tie	1–1
79	2001	Columbus, OH	Ohio State	3–1
80	2001	Columbus, OH	No. 8 Michigan	6–2
81	2002	Ann Arbor, MI	No. 10 Michigan	4–0
82	2002	Ann Arbor, MI	No. 10 Michigan	6–3
83	2002	Detroit, MI	No. 9 Michigan	2–1^{OT}
84	2003	Columbus, OH	Tie	4–4
85	2003	Columbus, OH	Tie	3–3
86	2003	Detroit, MI	No. 8 Michigan	3–0
87	2003	Columbus, OH	No. 5 Michigan	4–0
88	2003	Columbus, OH	No. 14 Ohio State	5–2
89	2004	Ann Arbor, MI	No. 9 Michigan	3–2
90	2004	Ann Arbor, MI	Michigan	7–1

No.	Date	Location	Winner	Score
91	2004	Detroit, MI	No. 12 Ohio State	4–2
92	2005	Columbus, OH	No. 10 Ohio State	4–1
93	2005	Columbus, OH	No. 3 Michigan	6–3
94	2005	Detroit, MI	No. 4 Michigan	4–2
95	2006	Ann Arbor, MI	Ohio State	7–5
96	2006	Ann Arbor, MI	No. 6 Michigan	3–2
97	2007	Columbus, OH	No. 10 Michigan	4–3
98	2007	Columbus, OH	Ohio State	6–5
99	2007	Ann Arbor, MI	Ohio State	3–2
100	2007	Ann Arbor, MI	No. 2 Michigan	4–2
101	2008	Ann Arbor, MI	No. 8 Michigan	4–3
102	2008	Ann Arbor, MI	No. 8 Michigan	6–1
103	2009	Columbus, OH	No. 3 Michigan	4–1
104	2009	Columbus, OH	No. 16 Ohio State	3–2
105	2009	Columbus, OH	Ohio State	5–3
106	2009	Columbus, OH	Michigan	2–1
107	2010	Columbus, OH	Ohio State	3–2^{OT}
108	2010	Columbus, OH	No. 11 Michigan	2–1
109	2011	Ann Arbor, MI	No. 13 Michigan	3–2
110	2011	Ann Arbor, MI	No. 13 Michigan	2–1
111	2011	Ann Arbor, MI	No. 14 Ohio State	2–1
112	2011	Ann Arbor, MI	No. 14 Ohio State	6–5
113	2012	Columbus, OH	No. 15 Michigan	4–0
114	2012	Cleveland, OH	No. 15 Michigan	4–1
115	2013	Columbus, OH	Michigan	5–3
116	2013	Columbus, OH	Michigan	6–3
117	2013	Ann Arbor, MI	No. 3 Michigan	4–3^{OT}
118	2013	Columbus, OH	No. 3 Michigan	5–4
119	2014	Ann Arbor, MI	Tie	2–2
120	2014	Columbus, OH	No. 13 Michigan	4–3

No.	Date	Location	Winner	Score
121	2014	Ann Arbor, MI	Michigan	8–3
122	2015	Columbus, OH	No. 19 Michigan	10–6
123	2015	Columbus, OH	Ohio State	5–3
124	2015	Ann Arbor, MI	No. 15 Michigan	5–2
125	2016	Columbus, OH	Tie	5–5
126	2016	Ann Arbor, MI	No. 6 Michigan	8–6
127	2016	Ann Arbor, MI	Ohio State	7–4
128	2016	Columbus, OH	Ohio State	6–5^{OT}
129	2017	Ann Arbor, MI	Michigan	5–4
130	2017	Ann Arbor, MI	No. 11 Ohio State	6–5
131	2017	Columbus, OH	No. 12 Ohio State	4–2
132	2017	Columbus, OH	Michigan	1–0
133	2017	Ann Arbor, MI	No. 15 Ohio State	3–2
134	2017	Ann Arbor, MI	No. 15 Ohio State	5–1
135	2018	Columbus, OH	No. 6 Ohio State	4–0
136	2018	Columbus, OH	No. 6 Ohio State	5–3
137	2018	Columbus, OH	No. 6 Ohio State	3–2^{OT}
138	2019	Columbus, OH	Michigan	2–1
139	2019	Columbus, OH	No. 4 Ohio State	4–2
140	2019	Ann Arbor, MI	Michigan	4–2
141	2019	Ann Arbor, MI	Tie	3–3
142	2019	Columbus, OH	No. 13 Ohio State	3–2
143	2019	Columbus, OH	No. 4 Ohio State	2–1
144	2020	Ann Arbor, MI	Michigan	3–2
145	2020	Ann Arbor, MI	No. 11 Ohio State	4–1
146	2021	Ann Arbor, MI	No. 9 Michigan	4–2
147	2021	Ann Arbor, MI	No. 9 Michigan	5–0
148	2021	Columbus, OH	Ohio State	3–2
149	2021	Columbus, OH	No. 7 Michigan	6–0
150	2021	Notre Dame, IN	No. 6 Michigan	6–4

No.	Date	Location	Winner	Score
151	2021	Columbus, OH	No. 3 Michigan	5–2
152	2021	Columbus, OH	No. 3 Michigan	6–1
153	2022	Ann Arbor, MI	No. 2 Michigan	5–3
154	2022	Ann Arbor, MI	No. 2 Michigan	3–0
155	2023	Ann Arbor, MI	No. 8 Ohio State	7–2
156	2023	Ann Arbor, MI	No. 6 Michigan	4–2
157	2023	Columbus, OH	Tie	3–3
158	2023	Cleveland, OH	No. 10 Ohio State	4–2
159	2023	Ann Arbor, MI	No. 4 Michigan	7–3
160	2023	Ann Arbor, MI	No. 7 Michigan	7–1
161	2023	Ann Arbor, MI	Tie	2–2
162	2024	Columbus, OH	No. 12 Michigan	4–2
163	2024	Columbus, OH	No. 12 Michigan	4–1
164	2025	Chicago, IL	No. 13 Ohio State	4–3
165	2025	Ann Arbor, MI	No. 9 Michigan	3–2^{OT}
166	2025	Columbus, OH	No. 8 Ohio State	2–1^{OT}
167	2025	Columbus, OH	No. 11 Michigan	4–3
168	2025	Ann Arbor, MI	No. 2 Michigan	5–2
169	2025	Ann Arbor, MI	No. 2 Michigan	8–1
170	2026	Columbus, OH	No. 1 Michigan	6–4
171	2026	Columbus, OH	No. 1 Michigan	3–2^{OT}
172	2026	Ann Arbor, MI	No. 1 Michigan	7–3
173	2026	Columbus, OH	Ohio State	5–2
174	2026	Columbus, OH	No. 1 Michigan	5–4^{OT}
Series: Michigan leads 105–53–16
