= 2022–23 AJHL season =

Alberta Junior Hockey League season

- League: Alberta Junior Hockey League
- Sport: Ice hockey
- Number of games: 60
- Number of teams: 16

Regular season
- Season champions: Brooks Bandits

Post-season
- Finals champions: Brooks Bandits
- Runners-up: Spruce Grove Saints

AJHL seasons
- ← 2021–22 2023–24 →

The 2022–23 AJHL season was the 59th season of the Alberta Junior Hockey League (AJHL). The Brooks Bandits finished the regular season in first place overall and went on to win league championship Inter Pipeline Cup and the 2023 Centennial Cup national championship.

== Season highlights ==
The Brooks Bandits finished the regular season in first place overall after winning 53 of their 60 regular season games; the 2nd most wins in a season in league history. The record for most wins in a season was set by the Brooks Bandits in the 2018–19 season. The Brooks Bandits went on to win league championship Inter Pipeline Cup after defeating the Spruce Grove Saints in the finals 4 games to 1. The Brooks Bandits then went undefeated at the 2023 Centennial Cup in Portage la Prairie, Manitoba to win its 4th national championship.

== Regular season ==
Map of AJHL, 2021–22 to 2022–23
North Division
South Division

The standings at the end of the regular season were as follows:

Note: GP = Games Played, W = Wins, L = Losses, OTL = Overtime Losses, SOL = Shootout losses, Pts = Points

North Division
Team	GP	W	L	OTL	SOL	Pts
Spruce Grove Saints	60	49	7	2	2	102
Whitecourt Wolverines	60	36	19	3	2	77
Bonnyville Pontiacs	60	36	21	2	1	75
Sherwood Park Crusaders	60	33	20	3	4	73
Fort McMurray Oil Barons	60	24	26	6	4	58
Lloydminster Bobcats	60	23	34	1	2	49
Grande Prairie Storm	60	19	33	5	3	46
Drayton Valley Thunder	60	15	42	0	3	33

South Division
Team	GP	W	L	OTL	SOL	Pts
Brooks Bandits	60	53	5	1	1	108
Blackfalds Bulldogs	60	39	18	1	2	81
Drumheller Dragons	60	33	21	4	2	72
Okotoks Oilers	60	34	23	1	2	71
Camrose Kodiaks	60	27	30	2	1	57
Canmore Eagles	60	24	32	2	2	52
Calgary Canucks	60	19	32	6	3	47
Olds Grizzlys	60	16	39	4	1	37

== Scoring leaders ==
GP = Games Played, G = Goals, A = Assists, P = Points, PIM = Penalties In Minutes

Player	Team	GP	G	A	Pts	PIM
Aiden Fink	Brooks Bandits	54	41	56	97	32
Brett Meerman	Blackfalds Bulldogs	60	30	64	94	36
Matteo Giampa	Bonnyville Pontiacs	54	27	65	92	45
Dario Beljo	Brooks Bandits	60	34	55	89	30
Tyler Wallace	Blackfalds Bulldogs	54	42	42	84	42
Luigi Benincasa	Spruce Grove Saints	60	31	48	79	36
Daniel Kernaghan	Drayton Valley Thunder	57	32	43	75	41
Jason Siedem	Blackfalds Bulldogs	58	27	48	75	26
Nicolas Beaudoin	Bonnyville Pontiacs	55	40	34	74	53
Sam Court	Brooks Bandits	52	13	59	72	63

== Leading goaltenders ==
Note: GP = Games Played, W = Wins, L = Losses, OTL = Overtime Losses, SOL = Shootout Losses, GA = Goals Against, Sv% = Save Percentage, GAA = Goals Against Average, SO = Shutouts, Mins = Minutes played.

Player	Team	GP	W	L	OTL	SOL	GA	Sv%	GAA	SO	Mins
Ethan Barwick	Brooks Bandits	51	45	4	0	1	95	0.929	1.88	7	3,039
Zac Onyskiw	Spruce Grove Saints	23	18	2	0	1	44	0.924	2.06	4	1,282
Matthew Hennessey	Blackfalds Bulldogs	42	26	12	0	2	112	0.909	2.72	4	2,473
Parker Sawka	Spruce Grove Saints	41	23	16	0	1	107	0.894	2.72	2	2,360
Jameson Kaine	Spruce Grove Saints	35	27	4	2	1	93	0.892	2.72	1	2,049
Erick Roest	Sherwood Park Crusaders	36	19	12	2	3	100	0.911	2.79	2	2,150
Connor Mackenzie	Grande Prairie Storm	35	13	16	3	1	99	0.929	2.86	2	2,076
Freddie Halyk	Camrose Kodiaks	45	20	22	0	1	132	0.910	3.05	3	2,600
Garrett Fuller	Drumheller Dragons	42	22	14	3	0	118	0.892	3.08	2	2,300
Gabe Gratton	Fort McMurray Oil Barons	42	18	16	3	4	133	0.906	3.20	0	2,495

== Post-season ==
The top 7 teams in each division advanced to the post-season consisting of four best-of-7 rounds. The first place teams in each division, namely the Spruce Grove Saints in the North Division and the Brooks Bandits in the South Division, received a bye in the first round.

1st round
Okotoks	4
Camrose	0
Blackfalds	4
Calgary	1
Drumheller	4
Canmore	2
Sherwood Park	4
Fort McMurray	3
Whitecourt	4
Grande Prairie	0
Bonnyville	4
Lloydminster	2

Quarter-finals
Brooks	4
Okotoks	2
Blackfalds	4
Drumheller	3
Spruce Grove	4
Sherwood Park	1
Whitecourt	1
Bonnyville	4

Semi-finals
Brooks	4
Blackfalds	0
Spruce Grove	4
Bonnyville	1

Final
Brooks	4
Spruce Grove	1

== See also ==
- 2022 in ice hockey
- 2023 in ice hockey
- 2023 Centennial Cup
