= Aiden Fink =

Canadian ice hockey player (born 2004)

- Fink playing for Penn State in February 2025
- Born: November 24, 2004 (age 21) Calgary, Alberta, Canada
- Height: 5 ft 10 in (178 cm)
- Weight: 160 lb (73 kg; 11 st 6 lb)
- Position: Right wing
- Shoots: Right
- NHL team (P) Cur. team: Nashville Predators; Milwaukee Admirals (AHL)
- NHL draft: 218th overall, 2023; Nashville Predators
- Playing career: 2026–present

Aiden Fink (born November 24, 2004) is a Canadian professional ice hockey player for the Milwaukee Admirals of the American Hockey League (AHL) as a prospect for the Nashville Predators of the National Hockey League (NHL).

== Playing career ==
=== Junior ===
Fink spent two seasons with the Brooks Bandits of the Alberta Junior Hockey League (AJHL). During the 2021–22 season, he recorded 19 goals and 34 assists in 60 games and helped the Bandits win the 2022 Centennial Cup. During the 2022–23 season, he recorded 41 goals and 56 assists in 54 games. He led the AJHL with 97 points, averaging 1.8 points per game. During the 2023 Centennial Cup, he led all players in scoring with six goals and seven assists in six games to help the Bandits win their second consecutive Centennial Cup. He was subsequently awarded the Roland Mercier Trophy as tournament MVP and also named the tournament's Top Forward and Top Scorer. Following an outstanding season, he was named Top Forward and Most Valuable Player in both the AJHL and Canadian Junior Hockey League (CJHL).

On June 29, 2023, Fink was drafted in the seventh round, 218th overall, by the Nashville Predators in the 2023 NHL entry draft.

=== College ===
On April 16, 2023, Fink committed to play college ice hockey at Penn State. During the 2023–24 season, in his rookie season, he led the team in scoring with 15 goals and 19 assists in 34 games. He set a single-season program record with eight power play goals. His 34 points were third-most ever for a freshman at Penn State. In November 2023, Fink led the Big Ten Conference and tied for the national lead in goals (8) and assists (14). He averaged 1.00 goals per game and 1.75 points per game in eight games in November and was named HCA National Rookie of the Month. Following the season, he was named a finalist for the Big Ten Freshman of the Year and was named to the All-Big Ten Freshman Team.

=== Professional ===
On March 31, 2026, Fink turned pro, signing an AHL amateur try-out agreement with the Nashville Predators American Hockey League (AHL) affiliate, the Milwaukee Admirals.

== International play ==
Fink represented the U.S. Collegiate Selects team at the 2025 Spengler Cup where he led the team in scoring and won a silver medal. The Spengler Cup marked his return to the ice after suffering an injury in Penn State's first game of the season against Ohio State on October 30, 2025. During the semifinals against HC Sparta Praha he recorded a hat-trick to help the U.S. advance to the final. During the final against HC Davos, he recorded one goal and one assist and lost 3–6. He finished the tournament with four goals and three assists and was named to the All-Star team.

== Personal life ==
Fink was born to Liane Reid and Derek Fink, and has two brothers, Kyle and Brodie. His father played college football in Canada at the University of Alberta.

== Career statistics ==
			Regular season					Playoffs
Season	Team	League	GP	G	A	Pts	PIM	GP	G	A	Pts	PIM
2021–22	Brooks Bandits	AJHL	60	19	34	53	36	4	4	1	5	0
2022–23	Brooks Bandits	AJHL	54	41	56	97	32	15	8	5	13	0
2023–24	Penn State University	B1G	34	15	19	34	27	—	—	—	—	—
2024–25	Penn State University	B1G	40	23	30	53	12	—	—	—	—	—
2025–26	Penn State University	B1G	30	10	28	38	20	—	—	—	—	—
2025–26	Milwaukee Admirals	AHL	6	3	7	10	0	—	—	—	—	—
AHL totals			6	3	7	10	0	—	—	—	—	—

== Awards and honours ==
Award	Year
AJHL
South All-Star Team	2023
Top Forward	2023
Most Valuable Player	2023
Roland Mercier Trophy	2023
CJHL
Top Forward	2023
Most Valuable Player	2023
College
All-Big Ten Freshman Team	2024
All-Big Ten First Team	2025
AHCA West Second Team All-American	2025
International
Spengler Cup All-Star Team	2025
