= Quinn Finley =

American ice hockey player (born 2004)

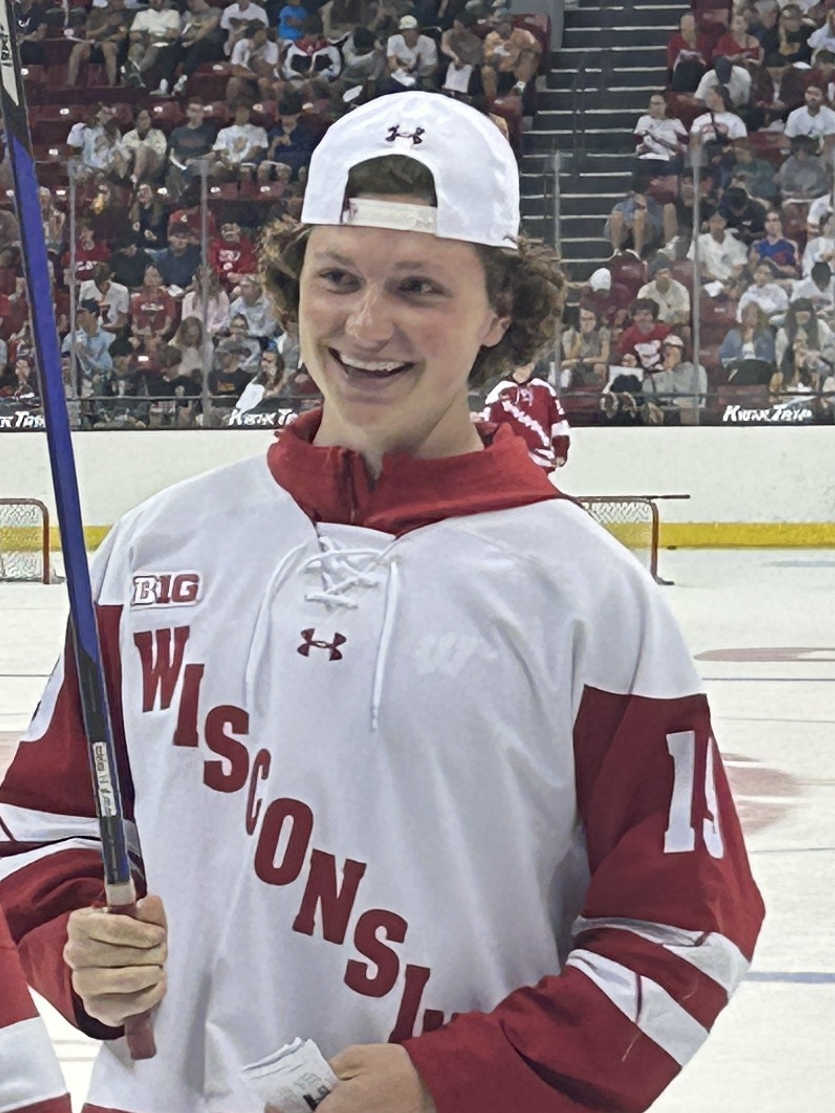
- Finley at the University of Wisconsin's "Student Shootout" event in September 2024
- Born: August 8, 2004 (age 22) Valparaiso, Indiana, U.S.
- Height: 6 ft 0 in (183 cm)
- Weight: 168 lb (76 kg; 12 st 0 lb)
- Position: Left wing
- Shoots: Left
- NHL team (P) Cur. team: New York Islanders; Hamilton Hammers (AHL)
- NHL draft: 78th overall, 2022; New York Islanders

Quinn Finley (born August 8, 2004) is an American professional ice hockey player who is a left winger for the Hamilton Hammers of the American Hockey League (AHL) as a prospect to the New York Islanders of the National Hockey League (NHL).

== Early life ==
Finley was born to Ingrid and Michael Finley in Valparaiso, Indiana. His family moved to Arizona when he was an infant and lived there for three years. He was raised in Suamico, Wisconsin, and attended Bay Port High School.

== Playing career ==
=== Junior ===
On May 7, 2020, Finley was drafted first overall by the Madison Capitols in phase one of the USHL draft. Finley began his junior hockey career with the Chicago Steel. During the 2020–21 season, he recorded one goal and five assists in 39 games and helped the Steel win the Clark Cup. During the 2021–22 season, in his draft year, he recorded 12 goals and 17 assists in 39 regular season games for the Capitols. He also scored five goals and five assists in 14 playoff games, as he helped lead the Capitols to the Eastern Conference finals. In November 2021, he suffered a broken collarbone and missed three months of action.

On October 17, 2022, Finley was named an alternate captain of the Capitols for the 2021–23 season. On January 13, 2023, he was traded back to the Steel. Prior to the trade, he recorded 12 goals and 17 assists in 39 games for the Capitols. He finished the season with 15 goals and 23 assists in 32 games for the Steel and two goals and two assists in six playoff games. During game two of the Eastern Conference semifinals against the Dubuque Fighting Saints, he scored the game-winning goal to help the Steel advance to the conference finals.

=== College ===
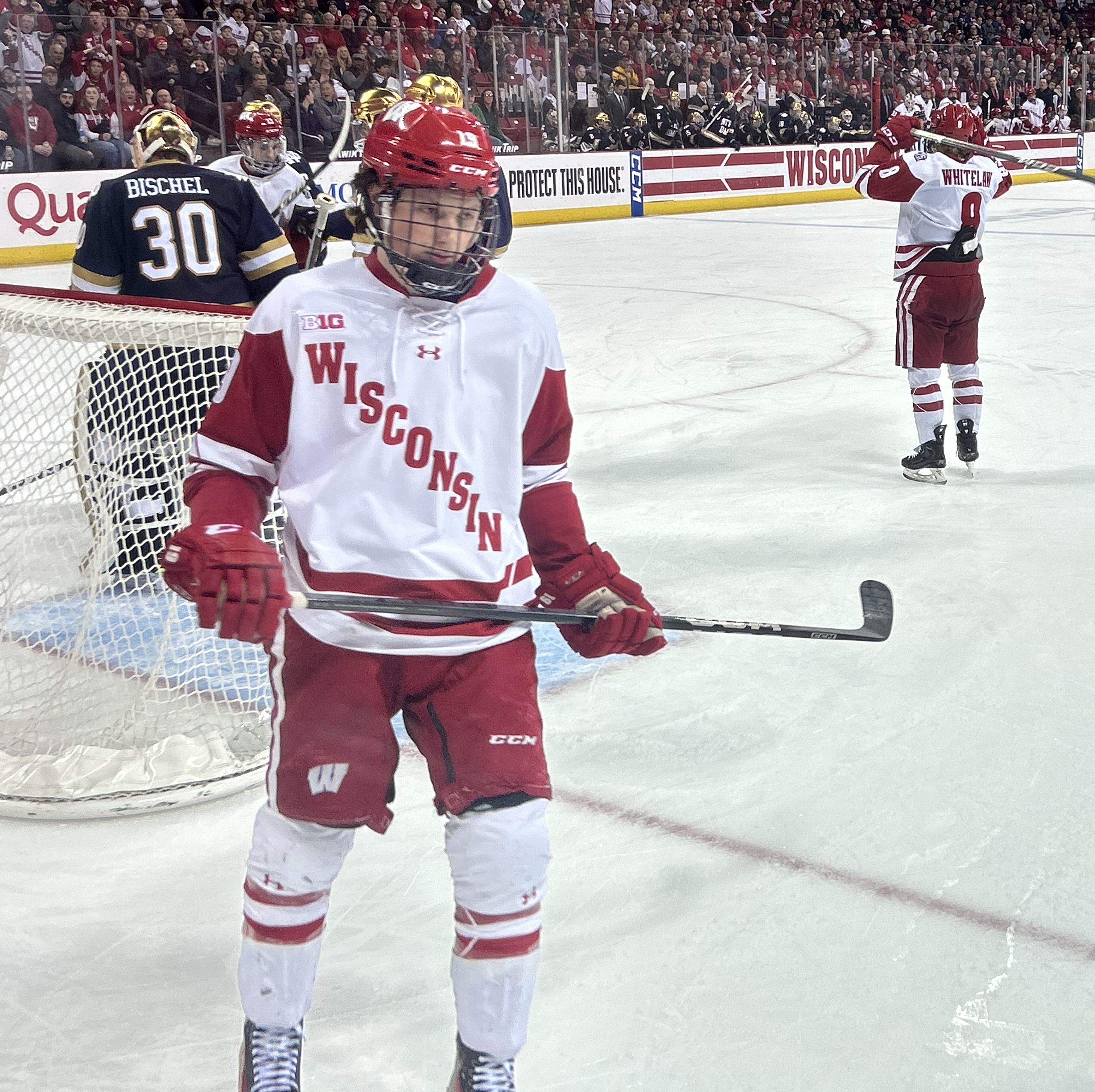
Finley playing with the Wisconsin Badgers in February 2024

Finley began his collegiate career at Wisconsin during the 2023–24 season. In his freshman year, he recorded ten goals and six assists in 36 games. His 16 points ranked third on the team among freshmen. On January 12, 2024, in a game against Lindenwood, he scored his first career hat-trick. Following his freshman year he gained ten pounds of muscle. Entering the 2024 Holiday Face–Off, he was tied for the NCAA lead with 12 goals. He scored at least a point in 15 of Wisconsin's first 18 games.

=== Professional ===
On April 15, 2026, the New York Islanders announced that the club had signed Quinn Finley to a two-year, entry-level contract.

== International play ==
Medal record

Representing United States

Ice hockey

World Junior Championships
Gold medal – first place	2024 Sweden	

On December 16, 2023, Finley was named to the United States men's national junior ice hockey team to compete at the 2024 World Junior Ice Hockey Championships. During the tournament, he recorded one goal and one assist in seven games and won a gold medal.

Quinn Finley competed for the U.S. Collegiate Selects team at the 2025 Spengler Cup.

== Career statistics ==
=== Regular season and playoffs ===
			Regular season					Playoffs
Season	Team	League	GP	G	A	Pts	PIM	GP	G	A	Pts	PIM
2020–21	Chicago Steel	USHL	39	1	5	6	8	—	—	—	—	—
2021–22	Madison Capitols	USHL	39	12	17	29	16	14	5	5	10	2
2022–23	Madison Capitols	USHL	23	10	17	27	12	—	—	—	—	—
2022–23	Chicago Steel	USHL	32	15	23	38	14	6	2	2	4	4
2023–24	University of Wisconsin	B1G	36	10	6	16	16	—	—	—	—	—
2024–25	University of Wisconsin	B1G	37	20	20	40	31	—	—	—	—	—
2025–26	University of Wisconsin	B1G	36	17	16	33	22	—	—	—	—	—
NCAA totals			73	30	26	56	47	—	—	—	—	—

=== International ===
Year	Team	Event	Result	GP	G	A	Pts	PIM
2024	United States	WJC	1st place, gold medalist(s)	7	1	1	2	0
Junior totals				7	1	1	2	0

== Awards and honours ==
Award	Year	Ref
College
All-Big Ten Second Team	2025	
