= Oliver Larsen =

Danish ice hockey player

- Born: 25 December 1998 (age 27) Aalborg, Denmark
- Height: 6 ft 1 in (185 cm)
- Weight: 207 lb (94 kg; 14 st 11 lb)
- Position: Defence
- Shoots: Right
- Liiga team Former teams: HIFK; Odense Bulldogs; IK Oskarshamn; Jukurit Kalpa
- National team: Denmark
- Playing career: 2015–present

Oliver Joakim Larsen (born 25 December 1998) is a Danish professional ice hockey defenceman currently playing for HIFK Hockey in the Liiga and the Danish national team.

== Playing career ==
He first represented Denmark at the 2019 IIHF World Championship.

== Career statistics ==
=== Regular season and playoffs ===
			Regular season					Playoffs
Season	Team	League	GP	G	A	Pts	PIM	GP	G	A	Pts	PIM
2013–14	Aalborg Pirates	DEN U17	18	3	6	9	8	4	2	1	3	4
2013–14	Aalborg Pirates	DEN U20	18	1	10	11	4	3	2	0	2	0
2013–14	Aalborg Pirates II	DEN.2	15	2	1	3	10	5	0	1	1	0
2014–15	Odense Bulldogs	DEN U17	15	13	16	29	8	5	7	1	8	0
2014–15	Odense Bulldogs	DEN U20	16	7	4	11	16	3	2	3	5	6
2014–15	Odense IK	DEN.2	22	1	4	5	10	7	0	1	1	25
2014–15	Odense Bulldogs	DEN	2	0	0	0	0	—	—	—	—	—
2015–16	Odense Bulldogs	DEN U20	8	4	6	10	34	3	0	3	3	4
2015–16	Odense IK	DEN.2	10	0	7	7	8	3	0	1	1	0
2015–16	Odense Bulldogs	DEN	35	1	3	4	45	7	0	0	0	0
2016–17	Odense Bulldogs	DEN	31	1	6	7	68	9	1	1	2	2
2017–18	Leksands IF	J20	28	6	8	14	84	2	0	0	0	0
2017–18	Leksands IF	Allsv	16	1	1	2	4	1	0	0	0	0
2018–19	IK Pantern	Allsv	51	5	12	17	51	—	—	—	—	—
2019–20	IF Björklöven	Allsv	46	4	10	14	30	2	0	0	0	0
2020–21	IK Oskarshamn	SHL	49	3	8	11	33	—	—	—	—	—
2021–22	IK Oskarshamn	SHL	1	0	0	0	0	—	—	—	—	—
2021–22	Jukurit	Liiga	42	1	17	18	61	7	1	0	1	0
2022–23	Jukurit	Liiga	36	2	17	19	12	—	—	—	—	—
2023–24	Jukurit	Liiga	59	7	24	31	41	6	0	1	1	4
DEN totals			68	2	9	11	113	16	1	1	2	2
Liiga totals			137	10	58	68	114	13	1	1	2	4

=== International ===
Year	Team	Event	GP	G	A	Pts	PIM
2016	Denmark	WJC18	7	0	1	1	4
2017	Denmark	WJC	5	0	1	1	0
2018	Denmark	WJC	6	0	0	0	2
2019	Denmark	WC	7	0	1	1	2
2021	Denmark	WC	7	0	0	0	2
2022	Denmark	OG	5	0	0	0	4
2022	Denmark	WC	7	1	1	2	4
2023	Denmark	WC	1	0	0	0	0
2024	Denmark	WC	7	0	0	0	2
Junior totals			18	0	2	2	6
Senior totals			34	1	2	3	14
