= T. J. Hughes (ice hockey) =

Canadian ice hockey player (born 2001)

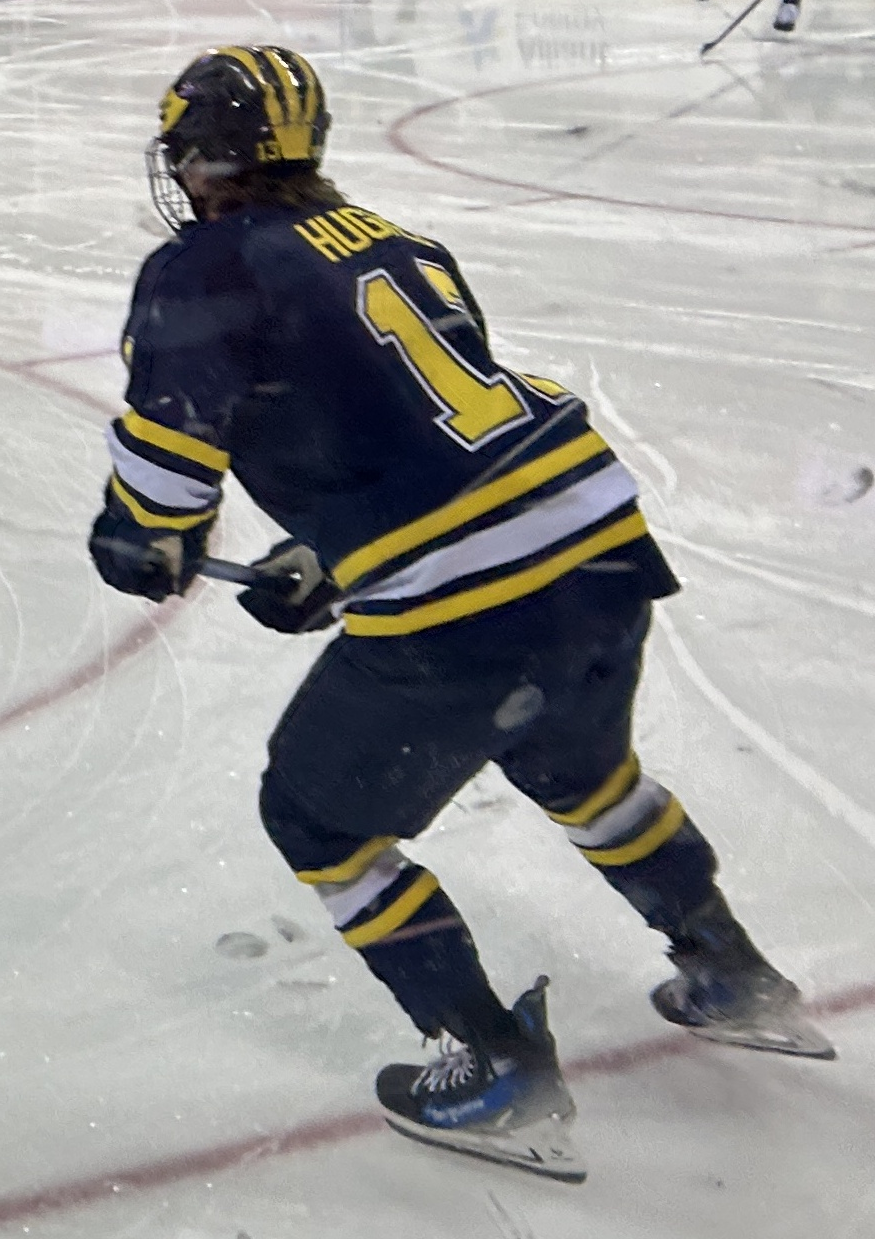
- Hughes with Michigan in January 2025
- Born: November 9, 2001 (age 25) Hamilton, Ontario, Canada
- Height: 6 ft 0 in (183 cm)
- Weight: 185 lb (84 kg; 13 st 3 lb)
- Position: Forward
- Shoots: Right
- NHL team: Colorado Avalanche
- NHL draft: Undrafted
- Playing career: 2026–present

T.J. Hughes (born November 9, 2001) is a Canadian professional ice hockey player who is a forward for the Colorado Avalanche of the National Hockey League (NHL). He played college ice hockey for the Michigan Wolverines.

== Playing career ==
=== Junior ===
Hughes played three seasons with the Brooks Bandits of the Alberta Junior Hockey League (AJHL). During the 2020–21 season, he recorded 15 goals and 16 assists in 20 games, in a season that was shortened due to the COVID-19 pandemic. In April 2021, Hughes led all AJHL players in scoring with six goals and eight assists in eight games, and was named Alberta Ford Dealers Player of the Month. He led the league in scoring with 31 points, and won the Ernie Love Trophy.

During the 2021–22 season, he recorded 66 goals and 61 assists in 60 regular season games. His 66 goals led the league, while his 127 points ranked second. He became the first AJHL player to reach 60 goals in the regular season since the 2000–01 season. His 66 goals are the eighth most goals in a single season in AJHL history, while his 28 powerplay goals are the third most. In November 2021, Hughes recorded 13 goals and 17 assists in 12 games. He recorded ten multi-point games and scored three game winning goals and was named Alberta Ford Dealers Player of the Month. He helped lead the Bandits to a 52–6–2 record, the Inter Pipeline Cup and the 2022 Centennial Cup. During the postseason he recorded 12 goals and 11 assists in 11 games. Following the season, he was named to the AJHL All-League team, and the inaugural AJHL Top Forward award winner. He was also named a finalist for the Canadian Junior Hockey League Forward of the Year.

=== College ===
In May 2022, Hughes committed to play college ice hockey for the Wolverines at the University of Michigan. During the 2022–23 season, in his freshman year, he recorded 13 goals and 23 assists in 39 games. He made his collegiate debut on October 7, 2022, in a game against Lindenwood, and recorded an assist for his career point. He scored his first career goal on October 14, 2022, in a game against Boston University.

During the 2023–24 season, in his sophomore year, he recorded 19 goals and 29 assists 41 games. During a weekend series against Lindenwood, he recorded three goals and five assists and was named the Big Ten Second Star of the Week for the week ending October 31, 2023. Following the season, he received invitations from multiple teams to attend NHL development camp. His former teammate, Dylan Duke, convinced him to attend development camp for the Tampa Bay Lightning.

Hughes was named an alternate captain for the 2024–25 season. During his junior year he led the team in scoring with 15 goals and 23 assists in 36 games. On November 23, 2024, he scored his first career hat-trick in a game against Penn State. He finished the game with four goals and one assist for a career-high five points. He finished the weekend series tying the national lead for goals scored with five and was named the Big Ten Second Star of the Week for the week ending November 26. Hughes had an NCAA-best 15-game point streak, with a point in every game between December 14, 2024, and February 15, 2025, scoring 22 points on nine goals and 15 assists. On January 5, he recorded three assists in a game against Ohio State, to surpass the 100 career point milestone. Following the season he was named to the All-Big Ten Second Team.

During the 2025–26 season, in his senior year he led the team in scoring with 22 goals and 35 assists in 40 games. Following the season he was named to the All-Big Ten First Team and Big Ten Player of the Year. He is the Big Ten's all-time leading scorer with 108 points in conference play, holding the assist record (64) and ranking second in goals (44). During the 2026 Big Ten men's ice hockey tournament, he recorded two goals and four assists in three games, to help Michigan win their fourth Big Ten men's ice hockey tournament championship. He was subsequently named to the Big Ten All-Tournament Team and Big Ten Tournament MVP. He was also named a top-three finalist for the Hobey Baker Award and an AHCA West First Team All-American. He finished his collegiate career averaging 1.14 points per game, on 69 goals and 110 assists. He recorded 49 multi-point games, along with 27 power-play goals, 10 game-winning goals, and one hat trick. He ranks 20th in program history with 179 points.

=== Professional ===
On April 11, 2026, Hughes signed a one-year, entry-level contract with the Colorado Avalanche for the 2026–27 NHL season. He was assigned to the Avalanche's AHL affiliate, the Colorado Eagles, on a professional tryout (PTO) contract for the remainder of the 2025–26 AHL season.

Following his performance at training camp and in the preseason, including a hat trick in a 5-2 win over the Winnipeg Jets, Hughes made the Avalanche's opening night roster for the 2026–27 season. He made his NHL debut for the Avalanche on October 2, 2026, against the Los Angeles Kings. During a game against the Calgary Flames on October 8, 2026, he recorded his first NHL assist on a Jaden Schwartz goal. He scored his first career NHL goal against Artūrs Šilovs of the Pittsburgh Penguins on October 16, 2026.

== Personal life ==
Hughes was born to Terry and Lisa Hughes, and has two older sisters, Olivia and Vanessa. Vanessa played college basketball at the University of Waterloo, where she was a OUA all-star.

== Career statistics ==
			Regular season					Playoffs
Season	Team	League	GP	G	A	Pts	PIM	GP	G	A	Pts	PIM
2019–20	Brooks Bandits	AJHL	58	13	23	36	20	—	—	—	—	—
2020–21	Brooks Bandits	AJHL	20	15	16	31	6	—	—	—	—	—
2021–22	Brooks Bandits	AJHL	60	66	61	127	14	11	12	11	23	2
2022–23	University of Michigan	B1G	39	13	23	36	10	—	—	—	—	—
2023–24	University of Michigan	B1G	41	19	29	48	27	—	—	—	—	—
2024–25	University of Michigan	B1G	36	15	23	38	12	—	—	—	—	—
2025–26	University of Michigan	B1G	40	22	35	57	22	—	—	—	—	—
2025–26	Colorado Eagles	AHL	2	1	1	2	0	17	4	10	14	6
NCAA totals			156	69	110	179	71	—	—	—	—	—

== Awards and honours ==
Award	Year	Ref
College
All-Big Ten Second Team	2025	
All-Big Ten First Team	2026	
Big Ten Player of the Year	2026	
Big Ten All-Tournament Team	2026	
Big Ten Tournament MVP	2026	
AHCA West First Team All-American	2026	

Awards and achievements
Preceded by Isaac Howard	Big Ten Player of the Year; 2025–26	Succeeded by Incumbent
Preceded by Isaac Howard	Big Ten Tournament MOP; 2026	Succeeded by Incumbent
