= 2021–22 AJHL season =

Alberta Junior Hockey League season

- League: Alberta Junior Hockey League
- Sport: Ice hockey
- Number of games: 60
- Number of teams: 16

Regular season
- Season champions: Brooks Bandits

Post-season
- North division champions: Spruce Grove Saints
- South division champions: Brooks Bandits

Inter Pipeline Cup
- Champions: Brooks Bandits
- Runners-up: Spruce Grove Saints

AJHL seasons
- ← 2020–21 2022–23 →

The 2021–22 AJHL season was the 58th season of the Alberta Junior Hockey League (AJHL). The Brooks Bandits finished the regular season in 1st place overall having won 52 of 60 games played. They were then undefeated in the post-season Inter Pipeline Cup playoffs, defeating the Spruce Grove Saints in the final round. They then went on to defeat the Ontario Junior Hockey League championship Pickering Panthers to win the 2022 Centennial Cup national championship.

The Drayton Valley Thunder set a league record for the fewest penalty minutes for a team in a single season with 713. The Brooks Bandits set a league record for the longest unbeaten steak in a single season with 36 wins and 1 overtime loss. Rookie Zach Bookman of the Brooks Bandits set league records for the most points in a season, with 102, and the most assists in a single season, with 81. The Okotoks Oilers tied the league record held by 6 other teams for most consecutive shutouts in a season with 3.

The former Calgary Mustangs moved to Blackfalds after a two-year leave of absence and were named the Blackfalds Bulldogs.

== Regular season ==
Map of AJHL, 2021–22 to 2022–23
North Division
South Division

The standings at the end of the regular season were as follows:

Note: GP = Games Played, W = Wins, L = Losses, OTL = Overtime Losses, SOL = Shootout losses, Pts = Points

North Division
Team	GP	W	L	OTL	SOL	Pts
Spruce Grove Saints	60	46	9	3	2	97
Fort McMurray Oil Barons	59	39	19	0	1	79
Bonnyville Pontiacs	59	34	16	6	2	76
Drayton Valley Thunder	60	33	17	7	2	75
Lloydminster Bobcats	59	29	25	2	3	63
Whitecourt Wolverines	57	26	26	4	1	57
Sherwood Park Crusaders	60	25	30	1	4	55
Grande Prairie Storm	59	22	29	5	3	52

South Division
Team	GP	W	L	OTL	SOL	Pts
Brooks Bandits	60	52	6	1	1	106
Drumheller Dragons	60	34	18	4	4	76
Camrose Kodiaks	59	33	24	2	0	68
Okotoks Oilers	58	28	26	4	0	60
Blackfalds Bulldogs	60	28	31	1	0	57
Canmore Eagles	59	20	30	6	3	49
Calgary Canucks	59	15	38	5	1	36
Olds Grizzlys	60	9	45	4	2	24

== Scoring leaders ==
GP = Games Played, G = Goals, A = Assists, P = Points, PIM = Penalties In Minutes

Player	Team	GP	G	A	Pts	PIM
Ryan McAllister	Brooks Bandits	60	57	82	139	38
TJ Hughes	Brooks Bandits	60	66	61	127	14
Zach Bookman	Brooks Bandits	55	21	81	102	30
Devin Phillips	Brooks Bandits	45	23	68	91	20
Rieger Lorenz	Okotoks Oilers	60	38	47	85	54
Brett Pfoh	Spruce Grove Saints	55	27	47	74	66
Caiden Gault	Spruce Grove Saints	58	46	27	73	38
Tyler Mahan	Whitecourt Wolverines	60	29	42	71	28
Noah Hackett	Brooks Bandits	59	34	36	70	60
Luigi Benincasa	Spruce Grove Saints	56	36	32	68	1

== Leading goaltenders ==
Note: GP = Games Played, W = Wins, L = Losses, OTL = Overtime Losses, SOL = Shootout Losses, GA = Goals Against, Sv% = Save Percentage, GAA = Goals Against Average, SO = Shutouts, Mins = Minutes played.

Player	Team	GP	W	L	OTL	SOL	GA	Sv%	GAA	SO	Mins
Ethan Barwick	Brooks Bandits	39	33	4	0	1	89	0.897	2.31	4	2,307
Eric Ward	Drumheller Dragons	41	24	9	4	3	91	0.910	2.41	2	2,269
Gabe Gratton	Fort McMurray Oil Barons	28	19	7	0	0	65	0.914	2.42	1	1,609
Jack McNaughton	Okotoks Oilers	27	14	9	3	0	63	0.907	2.43	4	1,553
Jackson Berry	Drayton Valley Thunder	36	21	9	3	1	91	0.925	2.57	1	2,121
Zac Onyskiw	Spruce Grove Saints	27	20	4	2	1	65	0.902	2.60	2	1,501
Maxwell Beckford	Brooks Bandits	28	20	2	1	1	69	0.895	2.63	4	1,573
Matthew Hennessey	Bonnyville Pontiacs	39	24	7	5	1	106	0.910	2.72	4	2,335
Carson Ironside	Whitecourt Wolverines	32	16	8	3	1	86	0.918	2.77	1	1,866
Logan Willcott	Camrose Kodiaks	30	15	12	0	0	76	0.888	2.99	2	1,524

== Post-season ==
The 2021–22 post-season was first full playoff in three years after they were in 2020 and 2021 due to the COVID-19 pandemic.

First round
Whitecourt	4
Bonnyville	2
Drayton Valley	4
Lloydminster	1
Fort McMurray	4
Sherwood Park	1
Okotoks	4
Blackfalds	0
Drumheller	4
Calgary	2
Canmore	4
Camrose	3

Quarter-finals
Whitecourt	0
Spruce Grove	4
Drayton Valley	4
Fort McMurray	2
Okotoks	4
Drumheller	2
Brooks	4
Canmore	0

Semi-finals
Spruce Grove	4
Drayton Valley	0
Okotoks	0
Brooks	4

Finals
Spruce Grove	1
Brooks	4

== See also ==
- 2021 in ice hockey
- 2022 in ice hockey
- Centennial Cup
