= 2025–26 Yale Bulldogs men's ice hockey season =

- Conference: ECAC Hockey
- Home ice: Ingalls Rink

Record
- Overall: 8–17–1
- Conference: 7–10–1
- Home: 6–6–1
- Road: 2–9–0
- Neutral: 0–2–0

Coaches and captains
- Head coach: Joe Howe
- Assistant coaches: Rob O'Gara; Arlen Marshall; Bill Maniscalco

The 2025–26 Yale Bulldogs Men's ice hockey season will be the 130th season of play for the program and the 64th in ECAC Hockey. The Bulldogs will represent Yale University in the 2025–26 NCAA Division I men's ice hockey season, play their home games at the Ingalls Rink and be coached by Joe Howe in his 1st season on an interim basis.

== Season ==
Less than a month before fall classes started, Keith Allain announced his retirement. Due to the shot time before the start of the hockey season, assistant coach Joe Howe was promoted to interim head coach for the year. The administration would then hold a national search for a permanent head coach after the season had finished.

== Departures ==
Player	Position	Nationality	Cause
Will Dineen	Forward	United States	Graduation (signed with Laval Rocket)
Briggs Gammill	Forward	United States	Graduation (retired)
Dylan Herzog	Defenseman	United States	Graduation (retired)
Jason Marsella	Defenseman	United States	Left program (retired)
Kieran O'Hearn	Defenseman	Canada	Graduation (retired)
Luke Pearson	Goaltender	Canada	Graduate transfer to Notre Dame
Connor Sullivan	Defenseman	United States	Graduation (retired)

== Recruiting ==
Player	Position	Nationality	Age	Notes
Kurt Gurkan	Forward	United States	21	Darien, CT
Dylan Hunt	Defenseman	United States	19	Marlborough, MA
Braden Keeble	Forward	Canada	21	Brandon, MB
Hudson Miller	Forward	United States	20	New York, NY
Tom Molson	Forward	Canada	20	Montréal, QC
Joose Pesonen	Defenseman	Finland	20	Kuopio, FIN
James Shannon	Forward	United States	21	New York, NY

== Roster ==
As of August 28, 2025.

No.	Nat.	Player	Class	Pos	Height	Weight	DoB	Hometown	Previous team	NHL rights
1	(United States)	Jack Stark	Junior	G	5' 9" (1.75 m)	146 lb (66 kg)	2003-06-19	Chaska, Minnesota	Chicago Steel (USHL)	—
2	(United States)	Bayard Hall	Senior	D	6' 1" (1.85 m)	176 lb (80 kg)	2002-08-16	Oldwick, New Jersey	Youngstown Phantoms (USHL)	—
4	(United States)	Dylan Hunt	Freshman	D	6' 0" (1.83 m)	174 lb (79 kg)	2006-02-09	Marlborough, Massachusetts	Cedar Rapids RoughRiders (USHL)	—
5	(Finland)	Joose Pesonen	Freshman	D	5' 10" (1.78 m)	163 lb (74 kg)	2005-05-12	Kuopio, Finland	South Shore Kings (NCDC)	—
6	(United States)	Hudson Miller	Freshman	D	6' 4" (1.93 m)	190 lb (86 kg)	2005-07-14	New York, New York	West Kelowna Warriors (BCHL)	—
7	(United States)	Tucker Hartmann	Senior	D	5' 11" (1.8 m)	174 lb (79 kg)	2002-04-04	Southborough, Massachusetts	Salmon Arm Silverbacks (BCHL)	—
8	(United States)	Ronan O'Donnell	Sophomore	F	6' 2" (1.88 m)	174 lb (79 kg)	2004-02-26	Fairfield, Connecticut	Madison Capitols (USHL)	—
9	(United States)	Micah Berger	Sophomore	F	5' 11" (1.8 m)	174 lb (79 kg)	2004-06-29	Bethesda, Maryland	Surrey Eagles (BCHL)	—
10	(United States)	James Shannon	Freshman	F	5' 10" (1.78 m)	179 lb (81 kg)	2004-08-12	New York, New York	Coquitlam Express (BCHL)	—
11	(Canada)	Hughie Hooker	Sophomore	D	5' 7" (1.7 m)	159 lb (72 kg)	2003-10-11	Brandon, Manitoba	Brooks Bandits (BCHL)	—
12	(United States)	Will Richter	Junior	F	6' 1" (1.85 m)	172 lb (78 kg)	2004-08-20	Greenwich, Connecticut	Penticton Vees (BCHL)	—
13	(Finland)	Iisai Pesonen	Junior	F	5' 10" (1.78 m)	150 lb (68 kg)	2004-02-20	Kuopio, Finland	KalPa U20 (U20 SM-sarja)	—
14	(Canada)	Tom Molson	Freshman	F	5' 8" (1.73 m)	154 lb (70 kg)	2005-01-05	Montréal, Quebec	Victoria Grizzlies (BCHL)	—
15	(Canada)	Kalen Szeto	Senior	F	5' 7" (1.7 m)	155 lb (70 kg)	2002-10-12	Vancouver, British Columbia	Victoria Grizzlies (BCHL)	—
16	(United States)	David Andreychuk	Junior	F	6' 1" (1.85 m)	190 lb (86 kg)	2002-04-02	Los Angeles, California	Northeast Generals (NAHL)	—
17	(United States)	Zach Wagnon	Sophomore	F	6' 0" (1.83 m)	174 lb (79 kg)	2004-03-26	Red Bank, New Jersey	Surrey Eagles (BCHL)	—
18	(Canada)	Seiya Tanaka-Campbell	Junior	F	5' 9" (1.75 m)	170 lb (77 kg)	2003-02-12	Mill Bay, British Columbia	Vernon Vipers (BCHL)	—
19	(Canada)	JoJo Tanaka-Campbell	Senior	F	5' 11" (1.8 m)	185 lb (84 kg)	2001-01-11	Mill Bay, British Columbia	Vernon Vipers (BCHL)	—
20	(Canada)	Owen Forester	Junior	D	5' 10" (1.78 m)	185 lb (84 kg)	2003-06-17	Mississauga, Ontario	Milton Menace (OJHL)	—
21	(United States)	Kurt Gurkan	Freshman	F	5' 10" (1.78 m)	179 lb (81 kg)	2004-02-13	Darien, Connecticut	Muskegon Lumberjacks (USHL)	—
22	(Canada)	Rhys Bentham	Junior	D	5' 10" (1.78 m)	172 lb (78 kg)	2002-05-15	Calgary, Alberta	Cranbrook Bucks (BCHL)	—
23	(United States)	Joe Blackley	Sophomore	D	5' 11" (1.8 m)	185 lb (84 kg)	2003-09-08	Lockport, New York	Cranbrook Bucks (BCHL)	—
24	(United States)	David Chen	Senior	F	6' 0" (1.83 m)	172 lb (78 kg)	2003-04-01	Livingston, New Jersey	Cedar Rapids RoughRiders (USHL)	—
26	(Canada)	Elan Bar-Lev-Wise	Senior	F	6' 0" (1.83 m)	190 lb (86 kg)	2001-02-01	Vancouver, British Columbia	West Kelowna Warriors (BCHL)	—
27	(United States)	Donovan Frias	Sophomore	F	6' 4" (1.93 m)	201 lb (91 kg)	2004-11-09	Hudson, Massachusetts	Cranbrook Bucks (BCHL)	—
28	(United States)	Julian Frias	Sophomore	F	6' 4" (1.93 m)	201 lb (91 kg)	2004-11-09	Hudson, Massachusetts	Cranbrook Bucks (BCHL)	—
29	(Canada)	Braden Keeble	Freshman	F	5' 10" (1.78 m)	170 lb (77 kg)	2004-06-01	Brandon, Manitoba	Whitecourt Wolverines (AJHL)	—
31	(Canada)	Noah Pak	Sophomore	G	6' 0" (1.83 m)	161 lb (73 kg)	2003-06-01	Oakville, Ontario	Collingwood Blues (OJHL)	—

== Standings ==
2025–26 ECAC Hockey Standings
	Conference record										Overall record					
	GP	W	L	T	OTW	OTL	SW	PTS	GF	GA	GP	W	L	T	GF	GA
#8 Quinnipiac †	22	17	4	1	2	0	0	50	102	48	36	26	7	3	154	81
#12 Dartmouth	22	13	5	4	0	1	3	47	81	53	30	19	7	4	110	66
#9 Cornell	22	15	6	1	1	1	1	47	71	42	29	20	8	1	97	56
Princeton	22	11	9	2	0	1	1	37	63	57	30	15	12	3	89	82
Union	22	11	9	2	1	1	1	36	71	68	34	21	10	3	127	88
Harvard	22	11	10	1	0	1	0	35	61	64	30	14	14	2	83	87
Colgate	22	9	10	3	2	0	2	30	68	74	34	12	18	4	94	115
Clarkson	22	9	10	3	2	0	1	29	65	65	34	15	16	3	102	103
Rensselaer	22	8	13	1	0	1	0	26	55	70	34	11	22	1	79	113
Yale	22	7	14	1	2	2	0	22	63	80	30	8	21	1	77	112
St. Lawrence	22	6	15	1	0	0	1	20	59	99	34	7	24	3	82	147
Brown	22	4	16	2	0	2	1	17	44	83	30	5	23	2	63	110
Championship: March 21, 2025 † indicates conference regular season champion (Cleary Cup) * indicates conference tournament champion (Whitelaw Cup); Rankings: USCHO.com Top 20 Poll; updated March 2, 2026

== Schedule and results ==
Date	Time	Opponent^{#}	Rank^{#}	Site	TV	Decision	Result	Attendance	Record
Exhibition
October 15	7:00 pm	Univerzitní Hokej*		Ingalls Rink • New Haven, Connecticut (Exhibition)	ESPN+		W 6–0		
Regular Season
November 2	5:00 pm	at Dartmouth*		Thompson Arena • Hanover, New Hampshire	ESPN+	Stark	L 1–6	1,840	0–1–0
November 7	7:00 pm	#5 Quinnipiac		Ingalls Rink • New Haven, Connecticut	ESPN+, SNY	Pak	W 2–1	1,960	1–1–0 (1–0–0)
November 8	7:00 pm	Princeton		Ingalls Rink • New Haven, Connecticut	ESPN+	Pak	W 2–1 ^{OT}	1,645	2–1–0 (2–0–0)
November 14	7:00 pm	at Colgate		Class of 1965 Arena • Hamilton, New York	ESPN+	Pak	L 3–4 ^{OT}	924	2–2–0 (2–1–0)
November 15	7:00 pm	at #20 Cornell		Lynah Rink • Ithaca, New York	ESPN+	Stark	L 2–5	4,267	2–3–0 (2–2–0)
November 21	7:00 pm	at Brown		Meehan Auditorium • Providence, Rhode Island	ESPN+	Pak	L 2–4	642	2–4–0 (2–3–0)
November 22	7:00 pm	Brown		Ingalls Rink • New Haven, Connecticut	ESPN+	Stark	W 3–1	1,145	3–4–0 (3–3–0)
November 28	7:00 pm	Omaha*		Ingalls Rink • New Haven, Connecticut	ESPN+	Stark	W 2–1	1,267	4–4–0
November 29	7:00 pm	Omaha*		Ingalls Rink • New Haven, Connecticut	ESPN+	Pak	L 1–3	1,120	4–5–0
December 5	7:00 pm	at Harvard		Bright-Landry Hockey Center • Boston, Massachusetts (Rivalry)	ESPN+	Stark	L 2–3	2,132	4–6–0 (3–4–0)
December 6	7:00 pm	at #10 Dartmouth		Thompson Arena • Hanover, New Hampshire	ESPN+	Stark	L 1–6	2,238	4–7–0 (3–5–0)
December 13	7:00 pm	at Merrimack*		J. Thom Lawler Rink • North Andover, Massachusetts	ESPN+	Stark	L 1–4	2,196	4–8–0
Coachella Valley Cactus Cup
January 2	10:00 pm	vs. St. Cloud State*		Acrisure Arena • Thousand Palms, California (Cactus Cup Semifinal)		Pak	L 2–6	—	4–9–0
January 3	6:30 pm	vs. #14 Minnesota State*		Acrisure Arena • Thousand Palms, California (Cactus Cup Consolation Game)		Stark	L 3–4	—	4–10–0
January 9	7:00 pm	St. Lawrence		Ingalls Rink • New Haven, Connecticut	ESPN+	Pak	W 8–1	1,451	5–10–0 (4–5–0)
January 10	7:00 pm	Clarkson		Ingalls Rink • New Haven, Connecticut	ESPN+	Pak	L 2–3	1,621	5–11–0 (4–6–0)
January 16	7:00 pm	at Rensselaer		Houston Field House • Troy, New York	ESPN+	Pak	W 8–3	1,679	6–11–0 (5–6–0)
January 17	7:00 pm	at Union		M&T Bank Center • Schenectady, New York	ESPN+	Pak	W 4–1	2,156	7–11–0 (6–6–0)
Connecticut Ice
January 23	7:30 pm	#13 Connecticut*		Ingalls Rink • New Haven, Connecticut (Connecticut Ice Semifinal)	YES	Pak	L 2–5	2,704	7–12–0
January 24	4:00 pm	Sacred Heart*		Ingalls Rink • New Haven, Connecticut (Connecticut Ice Consolation Game)	YES	Stark	L 2–3	2,521	7–13–0
January 30	7:00 pm	#10 Cornell		Ingalls Rink • New Haven, Connecticut	ESPN+	Pak	L 2–5	2,225	7–14–0 (6–7–0)
January 31	7:00 pm	Colgate		Ingalls Rink • New Haven, Connecticut	ESPN+	Stark	L 3–6	2,112	7–15–0 (6–8–0)
February 6	7:00 pm	at Princeton		Hobey Baker Memorial Rink • Princeton, New Jersey	ESPN+	Pak	L 1–3	2,154	7–16–0 (6–9–0)
February 7	7:00 pm	at #5 Quinnipiac		M&T Bank Arena • Hamden, Connecticut	ESPN+	Pak	L 0–8	3,625	7–17–0 (6–10–0)
February 13	7:00 pm	#12 Dartmouth		Ingalls Rink • New Haven, Connecticut	ESPN+	Pak	T 4–4 ^{SOL}	1,915	7–17–1 (6–10–1)
February 14	7:00 pm	Harvard		Ingalls Rink • New Haven, Connecticut (Rivalry)	ESPN+	Pak	W 3–2 ^{OT}	3,002	8–17–1 (7–10–1)
February 20	7:00 pm	at Clarkson		Cheel Arena • Potsdam, New York	ESPN+	Pak	L 1–4	1,956	8–18–1 (7–11–1)
February 21	7:00 pm	at St. Lawrence		Appleton Arena • Canton, New York	ESPN+	Pak	L 2–5	973	8–19–1 (7–12–1)
February 27	7:00 pm	Union		Ingalls Rink • New Haven, Connecticut	ESPN+	Pak	L 4–5 ^{OT}	1,608	8–20–1 (7–13–1)
February 28	7:00 pm	Rensselaer		Ingalls Rink • New Haven, Connecticut	ESPN+	Stark	L 2–4	1,783	8–21–1 (7–14–1)
ECAC Hockey Tournament
March 7	7:00 pm	at Colgate*		Class of 1965 Arena • Hamilton, New York (ECAC First Round)	ESPN+	Pak	L 2–3	1,195	8–22–1
*Non-conference game. ^{#}Rankings from USCHO.com Poll. All times are in Eastern Time. Source:

== Rankings ==
Poll	Week																											
Poll	Pre	1	2	3	4	5	6	7	8	9	10	11	12	13	14	15	16	17	18	19	20	21	22	23	24	25	26	27 (Final)
USCHO.com	NR	NR	NR	NR	NR	NR	NR	NR	NR	NR	NR	NR	–															
USA Hockey	NR	NR	NR	NR	NR	NR	NR	NR	NR	NR	NR	NR	–															

Note: USCHO did not release a poll in week 12.
Note: USA Hockey did not release a poll in week 12.
