= 2025–26 Princeton Tigers men's ice hockey season =

- Conference: ECAC Hockey
- Home ice: Hobey Baker Memorial Rink

Record
- Overall: 18–13–3
- Conference: 11–9–2
- Home: 14–2–1
- Road: 3–10–2
- Neutral: 1–1–0

Coaches and captains
- Head coach: Ben Syer
- Assistant coaches: Connor Jones; Shane Talarico; Dan Henningson

The 2025–26 Princeton Tigers Men's ice hockey season will be the 123rd season of play for the program and the 64th in ECAC Hockey. The Tigers represented Princeton University in the 2025–26 NCAA Division I men's ice hockey season, play their home games at the Hobey Baker Memorial Rink and be coached by Ben Syer in his 2nd season.

== Departures ==
Player	Position	Nationality	Cause
Jack Cronin	Forward	United States	Graduate transfer to New Hampshire
Noah De la Durantaye	Defenseman	Canada	Graduation (signed with Syracuse Crunch)
Alex Konovalov	Forward	Russia	Graduation (retired)
Ethan Pearson	Goaltender	Canada	Graduation (retired)

== Recruiting ==
Player	Position	Nationality	Age	Notes
Seamus Latta	Forward	United States	20	Bozeman, MT
Dan Moor	Goaltender	United States	19	Omaha, NE
Chris Reiniger	Defenseman	United States	19	Annapolis, MD
Matt Souliere	Forward	Canada	19	London, ON
Hans Ulvebne	Forward	Norway	21	Oslo, NOR

== Roster ==
As of August 8, 2025

No.	Nat.	Player	Class	Pos	Height	Weight	DoB	Hometown	Previous team	NHL rights
1	(United States)	Arthur Smith	Junior	G	6' 4" (1.93 m)	205 lb (93 kg)	2004-04-30	Farmington, Connecticut	Lone Star Brahmas (NAHL)	—
3	(United States)	Pat Reilly	Sophomore	D	6' 1" (1.85 m)	181 lb (82 kg)	2004-09-27	Avon, New Jersey	Coquitlam Express (BCHL)	—
4	(United States)	David Ma	Senior (RS)	D	5' 11" (1.8 m)	180 lb (82 kg)	2002-06-22	Yonkers, New York	Chicago Steel (USHL)	—
6	(Canada)	Ian Devlin	Junior	D	6' 2" (1.88 m)	210 lb (95 kg)	2002-01-07	Toronto, Ontario	Coquitlam Express (BCHL)	—
7	(Canada)	Kai Daniells	Junior	F	6' 0" (1.83 m)	185 lb (84 kg)	2003-03-07	Whistler, British Columbia	Nanaimo Clippers (BCHL)	—
8	(United States)	Tyler Rubin	Senior	D	5' 10" (1.78 m)	175 lb (79 kg)	2003-01-10	Natick, Massachusetts	West Kelowna Warriors (BCHL)	—
9	(Norway)	Hans Ulvbene	Freshman	F	6' 0" (1.83 m)	194 lb (88 kg)	2004-08-25	Oslo, Norway	Cedar Rapids RoughRiders (USHL)	—
11	(United States)	Jayden Sison	Senior	F	5' 9" (1.75 m)	185 lb (84 kg)	2003-01-27	Paoli, Pennsylvania	Coquitlam Express (BCHL)	—
12	(United States)	Jake Manfre	Sophomore	F	6' 0" (1.83 m)	201 lb (91 kg)	2004-04-22	Smithtown, New York	Coquitlam Express (BCHL)	—
13	(United States)	Drew Garzone	Sophomore	F	6' 1" (1.85 m)	190 lb (86 kg)	2004-05-30	Dover, Massachusetts	Coquitlam Express (BCHL)	—
14	(Canada)	Carson Buydens	Junior	F	6' 3" (1.91 m)	185 lb (84 kg)	2004-03-10	Gladstone, Manitoba	North Iowa Bulls (BCHL)	—
15	(Canada)	Julian Facchinelli	Sophomore	F	6' 0" (1.83 m)	181 lb (82 kg)	2004-07-04	Woodbridge, Ontario	Vernon Vipers (BCHL)	—
16	(United States)	Brendan Gorman	Senior	F	6' 0" (1.83 m)	175 lb (79 kg)	2003-02-17	Arlington, Massachusetts	Saint Sebastian's School (USHS–MA)	—
17	(United States)	Miles Gunty	Sophomore	F	5' 10" (1.78 m)	190 lb (86 kg)	2004-02-21	Bethesda, Maryland	Youngstown Phantoms (USHL)	—
18	(United States)	Joshua Karnish	Junior	F	5' 11" (1.8 m)	175 lb (79 kg)	2003-08-07	Marlton, New Jersey	Cedar Rapids RoughRiders (USHL)	—
19	(United States)	Seamus Latta	Freshman	F	6' 0" (1.83 m)	201 lb (91 kg)	2005-04-08	Bozeman, Montana	Victoria Grizzlies (BCHL)	—
20	(Canada)	Kevin Anderson	Senior	F	5' 11" (1.8 m)	175 lb (79 kg)	2003-09-15	Regina, Saskatchewan	Notre Dame Hounds (SJHL)	—
21	(United States)	Michael Young	Junior	F	5' 11" (1.8 m)	185 lb (84 kg)	2002-08-28	Kings Park, New York	New Jersey Titans (NAHL)	—
22	(Canada)	Matt Souliere	Freshman	F	6' 3" (1.91 m)	190 lb (86 kg)	206-08-01	London, Ontario	Ottawa 67's (OHL)	—
23	(Canada)	Kai Greaves	Sophomore	D	6' 2" (1.88 m)	205 lb (93 kg)	2003-03-04	Cambridge, Ontario	Prince George Spruce Kings (BCHL)	—
24	(United States)	David Jacobs	Senior	F	5' 10" (1.78 m)	180 lb (82 kg)	2001-09-26	Needham, Massachusetts	Cowichan Valley Capitals (BCHL)	—
25	(United States)	Nick Marciano	Senior	D	6' 1" (1.85 m)	205 lb (93 kg)	2002-05-19	Greenwich, Connecticut	Prince George Spruce Kings (BCHL)	—
26	(Canada)	Luc Pelletier	Sophomore	F	6' 4" (1.93 m)	205 lb (93 kg)	2003-09-07	Courtenay, British Columbia	Victoria Grizzlies (BCHL)	—
27	(United States)	Jaxson Ezman	Senior	F	6' 1" (1.85 m)	185 lb (84 kg)	2002-12-22	Middleton, Wisconsin	Dubuque Fighting Saints (USHL)	—
28	(Canada)	Brendan Wang	Senior	D	5' 11" (1.8 m)	180 lb (82 kg)	2002-02-08	Burnaby, British Columbia	Fort McMurray Oil Barons (AJHL)	—
30	(United States)	Conor Callaghan	Junior	G	6' 0" (1.83 m)	185 lb (84 kg)	2003-03-02	Ho-Ho-Kus, New Jersey	Muskegon Lumberjacks (USHL)	—
33	(United States)	Chris Reiniger	Freshman	D	5' 8" (1.73 m)	170 lb (77 kg)	2006-03-27	Annapolis, Maryland	Chicago Steel (USHL)	—
35	(United States)	Dan Moor	Freshman	G	6' 2" (1.88 m)	190 lb (86 kg)	2006-01-17	Omaha, Nebraska	Omaha Lancers (USHL)	—

== Standings ==
2025–26 ECAC Hockey Standings
	Conference record										Overall record					
	GP	W	L	T	OTW	OTL	SW	PTS	GF	GA	GP	W	L	T	GF	GA
#11 Quinnipiac †	22	17	4	1	2	0	0	50	102	48	38	26	9	3	157	88
#8 Dartmouth *	22	13	5	4	0	1	3	47	81	53	34	23	7	4	124	70
#9 Cornell	22	15	6	1	1	1	1	47	71	42	33	22	10	1	109	64
Princeton	22	11	9	2	0	1	1	37	63	57	34	18	13	3	103	90
Union	22	11	9	2	1	1	1	36	71	68	37	22	12	3	140	98
Harvard	22	11	10	1	0	1	0	35	61	64	34	16	16	2	92	100
Colgate	22	9	10	3	2	0	2	30	68	74	37	13	20	4	99	125
Clarkson	22	9	10	3	2	0	1	29	65	65	38	18	17	3	111	111
Rensselaer	22	8	13	1	0	1	0	26	55	70	35	11	23	1	80	115
Yale	22	7	14	1	2	2	0	22	63	80	31	8	22	1	79	115
St. Lawrence	22	6	15	1	0	0	1	20	59	99	35	7	25	3	85	151
Brown	22	4	16	2	0	2	1	17	44	83	31	5	24	2	63	119
Championship: March 21, 2026 † indicates conference regular season champion (Cleary Cup) * indicates conference tournament champion (Whitelaw Cup); Rankings: USCHO.com Top 20 Poll; updated March 22, 2026

== Schedule and results ==
Date	Time	Opponent^{#}	Rank^{#}	Site	TV	Decision	Result	Attendance	Record
Exhibition
October 25	7:00 pm	Simon Fraser*		Hobey Baker Memorial Rink • Princeton, New Jersey (Exhibition)	ESPN+		W 2–0		
Regular season
October 31	7:00 pm	Alaska*		Hobey Baker Memorial Rink • Princeton, New Jersey	ESPN+	Smith	W 5–2	920	1–0–0
November 1	7:00 pm	Alaska*		Hobey Baker Memorial Rink • Princeton, New Jersey	ESPN+	Smith	W 6–3	1,159	2–0–0
November 7	7:00 pm	at Brown		Meehan Auditorium • Providence, Rhode Island	ESPN+	Smith	L 1–2	729	2–1–0 (0–1–0)
November 8	7:00 pm	at Yale		Ingalls Rink • New Haven, Connecticut	ESPN+	Callaghan	L 1–2	1,645	2–2–0 (0–2–0)
November 15	7:00 pm	Stonehill*		Hobey Baker Memorial Rink • Princeton, New Jersey	ESPN+	Callaghan	W 3–2	1,475	3–2–0
November 21	7:00 pm	St. Lawrence		Hobey Baker Memorial Rink • Princeton, New Jersey	ESPN+	Callaghan	W 7–4	1,849	4–2–0 (1–2–0)
November 22	7:00 pm	Clarkson		Hobey Baker Memorial Rink • Princeton, New Jersey	ESPN+	Callaghan	W 4–3	1,738	5–2–0 (2–2–0)
November 28	7:00 pm	at Bowling Green*		Slater Family Ice Arena • Bowling Green, Ohio	Midco Sports+	Callaghan	L 1–4	3,135	5–3–0
November 29	7:00 pm	at Bowling Green*		Slater Family Ice Arena • Bowling Green, Ohio	Midco Sports+	Moor	L 3–4	1,619	5–4–0
December 5	7:00 pm	at Union		M&T Bank Center • Schenectady, New York	ESPN+	Callaghan	W 5–1	1,611	6–4–0 (3–2–0)
December 6	7:00 pm	at Rensselaer		Houston Field House • Troy, New York	ESPN+	Callaghan	W 4–0	1,360	7–4–0 (4–2–0)
December 28	7:00 pm	Brown*		Hobey Baker Memorial Rink • Princeton, New Jersey	ESPN+	Callaghan	W 5–4 ^{OT}	2,186	8–4–0
January 2	7:00 pm	#9 Dartmouth		Hobey Baker Memorial Rink • Princeton, New Jersey	ESPN+	Smith	W 5–4	1,964	9–4–0 (5–2–0)
January 3	7:00 pm	#18 Harvard		Hobey Baker Memorial Rink • Princeton, New Jersey	ESPN+	Smith	W 3–2	2,052	10–4–0 (6–2–0)
January 9	7:00 pm	Rensselaer	#20	Hobey Baker Memorial Rink • Princeton, New Jersey	ESPN+	Smith	W 5–2	1,847	11–4–0 (7–2–0)
January 10	7:00 pm	Union	#20	Hobey Baker Memorial Rink • Princeton, New Jersey	ESPN+	Smith	L 2–4	1,877	11–5–0 (7–3–0)
January 16	7:00 pm	at #13 Cornell	#18	Lynah Rink • Ithaca, New York	ESPN+	Smith	L 1–2	3,473	11–6–0 (7–4–0)
January 17	7:00 pm	at Colgate	#18	Class of 1965 Arena • Hamilton, New York	ESPN+	Smith	L 0–2	869	11–7–0 (7–5–0)
January 23	7:00 pm	at Bentley*		Bentley Arena • Waltham, Massachusetts	ESPN+	Smith	L 1–4	1,800	11–8–0
January 24	7:00 pm	at Bentley*		Bentley Arena • Waltham, Massachusetts	ESPN+	Callaghan	T 2–2 ^{OT}	1,545	11–8–1
January 30	7:00 pm	at Clarkson		Cheel Arena • Potsdam, New York	ESPN+	Callaghan	W 3–1	2,321	12–8–1 (8–5–0)
January 31	7:00 pm	at St. Lawrence		Appleton Arena • Canton, New York	ESPN+	Callaghan	L 2–6	817	12–9–1 (8–6–0)
February 6	7:00 pm	Yale		Hobey Baker Memorial Rink • Princeton, New Jersey	ESPN+	Smith	W 3–1	2,154	13–9–1 (9–6–0)
February 7	7:00 pm	Brown		Hobey Baker Memorial Rink • Princeton, New Jersey	ESPN+	Smith	W 5–3	1,939	14–9–1 (10–6–0)
February 14	7:00 pm	at #5 Quinnipiac		M&T Bank Arena • Hamden, Connecticut	ESPN+	Smith	L 1–4	2,759	14–10–1 (10–7–0)
February 15	4:00 pm	#5 Quinnipiac		Hobey Baker Memorial Rink • Princeton, New Jersey	ESPN+	Smith	L 1–4	2,230	14–11–1 (10–8–0)
February 20	7:00 pm	Colgate		Hobey Baker Memorial Rink • Princeton, New Jersey	ESPN+	Smith	T 1–1 ^{SOL}	1,881	14–11–2 (10–8–1)
February 21	7:00 pm	#11 Cornell		Hobey Baker Memorial Rink • Princeton, New Jersey	ESPN+	Smith	W 4–2	2,192	15–11–2 (11–8–1)
February 27	7:00 pm	at Harvard		Bright-Landry Hockey Center • Boston, Massachusetts	ESPN+	Smith	L 3–5	2,025	15–12–2 (11–9–1)
February 28	7:00 pm	at #14 Dartmouth		Thompson Arena • Hanover, New Hampshire	ESPN+	Smith	T 2–2 ^{SOW}	5,195	15–12–3 (11–9–2)
ECAC Hockey tournament
March 13	7:00 pm	#20 Union*		Hobey Baker Memorial Rink • Princeton, New Jersey (ECAC Quarterfinal Game 1)	ESPN+	Smith	W 5–2	1,427	16–12–3
March 14	7:00 pm	#20 Union*		Hobey Baker Memorial Rink • Princeton, New Jersey (ECAC Quarterfinal Game 2)	ESPN+	Smith	W 5–2	1,680	17–12–3
March 20	7:00 pm	vs. #8 Cornell*		Herb Brooks Arena • Lake Placid, New York (ECAC Semifinal)	ESPN+	Smith	W 3–2	5,164	18–12–3
March 21	7:00 pm	vs. #9 Dartmouth*		Herb Brooks Arena • Lake Placid, New York (ECAC Championship)	ESPN+	Smith	L 1–2 ^{OT}	5,454	18–13–3
*Non-conference game. ^{#}Rankings from USCHO.com Poll. All times are in Eastern Time. Source:

== Rankings ==
Poll	Week																											
Poll	Pre	1	2	3	4	5	6	7	8	9	10	11	12	13	14	15	16	17	18	19	20	21	22	23	24	25	26	27 (Final)
USCHO.com	NR	NR	NR	NR	NR	NR	NR	NR	NR	NR	RV	RV	–	RV	20	18	RV	RV	NR	NR	NR	RV	NR	RV	RV	RV		
USA Hockey	NR	NR	NR	NR	NR	NR	NR	NR	NR	NR	RV	NR	–	RV	19	18т	RV	RV	NR	NR	NR	RV	NR	RV	20т	RV		

Note: USCHO did not release a poll in week 12.
Note: USA Hockey did not release a poll in week 12.
