= 2025–26 Dartmouth Big Green men's ice hockey season =

ECAC Hockey Tournament, Champion NCAA Tournament, Regional Semifinals
- Conference: ECAC Hockey
- Home ice: Thompson Arena

Rankings
- USCHO: #8
- USA Hockey: #8

Record
- Overall: 23–8–4
- Conference: 14–5–4
- Home: 16–1–2
- Road: 5–6–2
- Neutral: 2–1–0

Coaches and captains
- Head coach: Reid Cashman
- Assistant coaches: Jason Tapp; Byron Pool; Brian Fahey

The 2025–26 Dartmouth Big Green Men's ice hockey season was the 119th season of play for the program and the 64th in ECAC Hockey. The Big Green represented Dartmouth College in the 2025–26 NCAA Division I men's ice hockey season, played their home games at the Thompson Arena and were coached by Reid Cashman in his fifth season.

== Departures ==
Player	Position	Nationality	Cause
Sean Chisholm	Forward	Canada	Graduation (signed with Texas Stars)
Braiden Dorfman	Forward	United States	Graduation (signed with Diables Rouges de Briançon)
Cooper Flinton	Forward	United States	Graduation (signed with Tampa Bay Lightning)
John Fusco	Defenseman	United States	Graduation (retired)
Luke Haymes	Forward	Canada	Signed professional contract Toronto Maple Leafs
Trym Løkkeberg	Forward	Norway	Graduation (retired)
Ian Pierce	Defenseman	United States	Graduation (signed with Adirondack Thunder)
Steven Townley	Forward	United States	Graduation (retired)

== Recruiting ==
Player	Position	Nationality	Age	Notes
Andrew Clarke	Forward	United States	21	Creve Coeur, MO
Cooper Cleaves	Defenseman	United States	19	Riverside, CT
Brock Cummings	Forward	Canada	20	Mississauga, ON
Brock Devlin	Defenseman	United States	20	Mission Viejo, CA
Tyler Grahme	Forward	United States	21	Bloomington, MN
Nathan Morin	Forward	Canada	21	Saint-Augustin-de-Desmaures, QC
Ryan Schelling	Forward	United States	21	Airmont, NY
Jason Stefanek	Forward	United States	21	Yorba Linda, CA

== Roster ==
As of August 17, 2025.

No.	Nat.	Player	Class	Pos	Height	Weight	DoB	Hometown	Previous team	NHL rights
2	(United States)	Eric Charpentier	Junior	D	6' 3" (1.91 m)	205 lb (93 kg)	2002-06-10	Silver Spring, Maryland	New Jersey Titans (NAHL)	—
4	(United States)	C. J. Foley	Junior	D	5' 11" (1.8 m)	174 lb (79 kg)	2004-02-11	Hanover, Massachusetts	Salmon Arm Silverbacks (BCHL)	—
5	(Canada)	Tucker McRae	Senior	D	6' 0" (1.83 m)	190 lb (86 kg)	2001-04-11	Calgary, Alberta	Okotoks Oilers (AJHL)	—
6	(United States)	Matt Fusco	Junior	D	5' 11" (1.8 m)	195 lb (88 kg)	2003-03-07	Westwood, Massachusetts	West Kelowna Warriors (BCHL)	—
7	(Russia)	Nikita Nikora	Junior	F	5' 10" (1.78 m)	170 lb (77 kg)	2004-01-21	St. Petersburg, Russia	Springfield Jr. Blues (NAHL)	—
8	(United States)	Austin Salani	Sophomore	F	6' 2" (1.88 m)	194 lb (88 kg)	2003-08-07	Hancock, Michigan	Austin Bruins (NAHL)	—
9	(United States)	Colin Grable	Sophomore	D	6' 1" (1.85 m)	190 lb (86 kg)	2003-01-16	Spring Lake, New Jersey	Cedar Rapids RoughRiders (USHL)	—
10	(United States)	Hayden Stavroff	Sophomore	F	5' 11" (1.8 m)	190 lb (86 kg)	2004-07-09	Dublin, Ohio	Alberni Valley Bulldogs (BCHL)	—
11	(Canada)	Nathan Morin	Freshman	F	5' 9" (1.75 m)	150 lb (68 kg)	2004-03-28	Saint-Augustin-de-Desmaures, Quebec	Chilliwack Chiefs (BCHL)	—
12	(United States)	Tim Busconi	Sophomore	D	6' 0" (1.83 m)	154 lb (70 kg)	2004-01-03	Milton, Massachusetts	Victoria Grizzlies (BCHL)	—
13	(Canada)	Joshua Schenk	Sophomore	F	6' 0" (1.83 m)	163 lb (74 kg)	2004-09-04	Whitehorse, Yukon Territory	Trail Smoke Eaters (BCHL)	—
15	(Canada)	Cam MacDonald	Senior	F	5' 9" (1.75 m)	185 lb (84 kg)	2002-03-08	Surrey, British Columbia	Vernon Vipers (BCHL)	—
18	(United States)	Hank Cleaves	Sophomore	F	6' 4" (1.93 m)	201 lb (91 kg)	2003-12-25	Riverside, Connecticut	Vernon Vipers (NAHL)	—
20	(United States)	Brock Devlin	Freshman	D	5' 10" (1.78 m)	165 lb (75 kg)	2005-05-11	Mission Viejo, California	Anchorage Wolverines (NAHL)	—
21	(United States)	Andrew Clarke	Freshman	F	5' 11" (1.8 m)	170 lb (77 kg)	2004-02-11	Creve Coeur, Missouri	Des Moines Buccaneers (USHL)	—
22	(United States)	Cooper Cleaves	Freshman	D	6' 4" (1.93 m)	205 lb (93 kg)	2006-01-05	Riverside, Connecticut	Green Bay Gamblers (USHL)	—
24	(Finland)	Oskari Vuorio	Junior	F	5' 9" (1.75 m)	175 lb (79 kg)	2004-05-06	Espoo, Finland	Jokerit U20 (U20 SM-sarja)	—
26	(United States)	Ryan Schelling	Freshman	F	6' 0" (1.83 m)	174 lb (79 kg)	2004-04-09	Airmont, New York	Langley Rivermen (BCHL)	—
27	(United States)	Tyler Grahme	Freshman	F	5' 11" (1.8 m)	185 lb (84 kg)	2004-07-11	Bloomington, Minnesota	West Kelowna Warriors (BCHL)	—
31	(United States)	Mikey Roberts	Junior	G	6' 0" (1.83 m)	175 lb (79 kg)	2002-12-25	Wilton, Connecticut	Taft School (USHS–CT)	—
32	(Canada)	Roan Clarke	Junior	G	6' 3" (1.91 m)	190 lb (86 kg)	2003-08-23	Cloverdale, British Columbia	Vernon Vipers (BCHL)	—
43	(Canada)	Owen Desilets	Junior	D	6' 1" (1.85 m)	175 lb (79 kg)	2004-02-03	Airdrie, Alberta	Alberni Valley Bulldogs (BCHL)	—
70	(Canada)	Emmett Croteau	Junior	G	6' 4" (1.93 m)	209 lb (95 kg)	2003-12-07	Bonnyville, Alberta	Clarkson (ECAC)	MTL, 162nd overall 2022
71	(Canada)	Brock Cummings	Freshman	F	6' 2" (1.88 m)	194 lb (88 kg)	2005-03-23	Mississauga, Ontario	Prince George Spruce Kings (BCHL)	—
86	(Canada)	Jack Silverberg	Sophomore	F	5' 9" (1.75 m)	201 lb (91 kg)	2004-12-01	Sherwood Park, Alberta	Okotoks Oilers (BCHL)	—
92	(United States)	Jason Stefanek	Freshman	F	5' 11" (1.8 m)	165 lb (75 kg)	2004-08-20	Yorba Linda, California	Trail Smoke Eaters (BCHL)	—
95	(United States)	Alex Krause	Senior	F	6' 1" (1.85 m)	190 lb (86 kg)	2001-07-22	Calabasas, California	Northeast Generals (NAHL)	—

== Standings ==
2025–26 ECAC Hockey Standings
	Conference record										Overall record					
	GP	W	L	T	OTW	OTL	SW	PTS	GF	GA	GP	W	L	T	GF	GA
#8 Quinnipiac †	22	17	4	1	2	0	0	50	102	48	40	27	10	3	162	95
#10 Dartmouth *	22	13	5	4	0	1	3	47	81	53	35	23	8	4	125	75
#12 Cornell	22	15	6	1	1	1	1	47	71	42	34	22	11	1	109	69
Princeton	22	11	9	2	0	1	1	37	63	57	34	18	13	3	103	90
Union	22	11	9	2	1	1	1	36	71	68	37	22	12	3	140	98
Harvard	22	11	10	1	0	1	0	35	61	64	34	16	16	2	92	100
Colgate	22	9	10	3	2	0	2	30	68	74	37	13	20	4	99	125
Clarkson	22	9	10	3	2	0	1	29	65	65	38	18	17	3	111	111
Rensselaer	22	8	13	1	0	1	0	26	55	70	35	11	23	1	80	115
Yale	22	7	14	1	2	2	0	22	63	80	31	8	22	1	79	115
St. Lawrence	22	6	15	1	0	0	1	20	59	99	35	7	25	3	85	151
Brown	22	4	16	2	0	2	1	17	44	83	31	5	24	2	63	119
Championship: March 21, 2026 † indicates conference regular season champion (Cleary Cup) * indicates conference tournament champion (Whitelaw Cup); Rankings: USCHO.com Top 20 Poll; updated April 15, 2026

== Schedule and results ==
Date	Time	Opponent^{#}	Rank^{#}	Site	TV	Decision	Result	Attendance	Record
Exhibition
October 26	3:00 pm	Norwich*		Thompson Arena • Hanover, New Hampshire (Exhibition)	ESPN+	Croteau	W 6–0		
Regular season
November 1	7:00 pm	at Stonehill*		Warrior Ice Arena • Boston, Massachusetts	NEC Front Row	Clarke	W 5–2	253	1–0–0
November 2	5:00 pm	Yale*		Thompson Arena • Hanover, New Hampshire	ESPN+	Croteau	W 6–1	1,840	2–0–0 (1–0–0)
November 7	7:00 pm	Colgate		Thompson Arena • Hanover, New Hampshire	ESPN+	Clarke	W 4–1	1,795	3–0–0 (2–0–0)
November 8	7:00 pm	#17 Cornell		Thompson Arena • Hanover, New Hampshire	ESPN+	Croteau	W 2–1	2,523	4–0–0 (3–0–0)
November 14	4:00 pm	at St. Lawrence	#19	Appleton Arena • Canton, New York	ESPN+	Clarke	W 6–1	1,486	5–0–0 (4–0–0)
November 15	4:00 pm	at Clarkson	#19	Cheel Arena • Potsdam, New York	ESPN+	Croteau	W 3–1	2,489	6–0–0 (5–0–0)
November 28	7:00 pm	Vermont*	#13	Thompson Arena • Hanover, New Hampshire	ESPN+	Clarke	W 7–2	3,794	7–0–0
November 29	4:00 pm	Merrimack*	#13	Thompson Arena • Hanover, New Hampshire	ESPN+	Croteau	W 1–0	2,512	8–0–0
December 5	7:00 pm	Brown	#10	Thompson Arena • Hanover, New Hampshire	ESPN+	Clarke	W 7–3	1,751	9–0–0 (6–0–0)
December 6	7:00 pm	Yale	#10	Thompson Arena • Hanover, New Hampshire	ESPN+	Croteau	W 6–1	2,238	10–0–0 (7–0–0)
December 12	7:00 pm	Army*	#8	Thompson Arena • Hanover, New Hampshire	ESPN+	Clarke	W 3–0	2,539	11–0–0
December 14	4:00 pm	at New Hampshire*	#8	Whittemore Center • Durham, New Hampshire (Rivalry)	ESPN+	Croteau	L 2–3 ^{OT}	5,469	11–1–0
Ledyard Bank Classic
December 27	5:00 pm	Arizona State*	#8	Thompson Arena • Hanover, New Hampshire (Ledyard Bank Classic Game 1)	ESPN+	Clarke	L 1–5	3,636	11–2–0
December 28	3:00 pm	Arizona State*	#8	Thompson Arena • Hanover, New Hampshire (Ledyard Bank Classic Game 2)	ESPN+	Croteau	W 4–1	2,855	12–2–0
Regular season
January 2	7:00 pm	at Princeton	#9	Hobey Baker Memorial Rink • Princeton, New Jersey	ESPN+	Clarke	L 4–5	1,964	12–3–0 (7–1–0)
January 3	7:00 pm	at #10 Quinnipiac	#9	M&T Bank Arena • Hamden, Connecticut	ESPN+	Croteau	L 3–5	3,041	12–4–0 (7–2–0)
January 9	7:00 pm	Harvard	#11	Thompson Arena • Hanover, New Hampshire	ESPN+	Croteau	W 5–4	3,773	13–4–0 (8–2–0)
January 16	7:00 pm	Clarkson	#10	Thompson Arena • Hanover, New Hampshire	ESPN+	Croteau	T 2–2 ^{SOW}	2,204	13–4–1 (8–2–1)
January 17	7:00 pm	St. Lawrence	#10	Thompson Arena • Hanover, New Hampshire	ESPN+	Clarke	W 4–0	2,736	14–4–1 (9–2–1)
January 23	7:00 pm	at #12 Cornell	#10	Lynah Rink • Ithaca, New York	ESPN+	Croteau	L 1–2 ^{OT}	4,267	14–5–1 (9–3–1)
January 24	7:00 pm	at Colgate	#10	Class of 1965 Arena • Hamilton, New York	ESPN+	Clarke	L 2–5	882	14–6–1 (9–4–1)
January 30	7:00 pm	Union	#14	Thompson Arena • Hanover, New Hampshire	ESPN+	Croteau	W 4–2	2,390	15–6–1 (10–4–1)
January 31	7:00 pm	Rensselaer	#14	Thompson Arena • Hanover, New Hampshire	ESPN+	Croteau	W 3–1	2,899	16–6–1 (11–4–1)
February 6	7:00 pm	at Harvard	#14	Bright-Landry Hockey Center • Boston, Massachusetts	ESPN+	Croteau	W 3–1	2,240	17–6–1 (12–4–1)
February 13	7:00 pm	at Yale	#12	Ingalls Rink • New Haven, Connecticut	ESPN+	Croteau	T 4–4 ^{SOW}	1,915	17–6–2 (12–4–2)
February 14	4:00 pm	at Brown	#12	Meehan Auditorium • Providence, Rhode Island	ESPN+	Croteau	L 4–3	756	17–7–2 (12–5–2)
February 20	7:00 pm	at Rensselaer	#14	Houston Field House • Troy, New York	ESPN+	Clarke	W 3–1	2,005	18–7–2 (13–5–2)
February 21	5:00 pm	at Union	#14	M&T Bank Center • Schenectady, New York	ESPN+	Croteau	T 3–3 ^{SOW}	2,455	18–7–3 (13–5–3)
February 27	7:00 pm	#7 Quinnipiac	#14	Thompson Arena • Hanover, New Hampshire	ESPN+	Croteau	W 7–4	2,991	19–7–3 (14–5–3)
February 28	7:00 pm	Princeton	#14	Thompson Arena • Hanover, New Hampshire	ESPN+	Croteau	T 2–2 ^{SOL}	5,195	19–7–4 (14–5–4)
ECAC Hockey Tournament
March 13	7:00 pm	Colgate*	#12	Thompson Arena • Hanover, New Hampshire (ECAC Quarterfinal Game 1)	ESPN+	Croteau	W 4–1	2,474	20–7–4
March 14	7:00 pm	Colgate*	#12	Thompson Arena • Hanover, New Hampshire (ECAC Quarterfinal Game 2)	ESPN+	Croteau	W 4–1	2,787	21–7–4
March 20	4:00 pm	vs. Clarkson*	#9	Herb Brooks Arena • Lake Placid, New York (ECAC Semifinal)	ESPN+	Croteau	W 4–0	4,000	22–7–4
March 20	4:00 pm	vs. Princeton*	#9	Herb Brooks Arena • Lake Placid, New York (ECAC Championship)	ESPN+	Croteau	W 2–1 ^{OT}	5,454	23–7–4
NCAA Tournament
March 26	5:00 pm	vs. #12 Wisconsin*	#8	DCU Center • Worcester, Massachusetts (Regional Semifinal)	ESPNU	Croteau	L 1–5		23–8–4
*Non-conference game. ^{#}Rankings from USCHO.com Poll. All times are in Eastern Time. Source:

== Rankings ==
Poll	Week																											
Poll	Pre	1	2	3	4	5	6	7	8	9	10	11	12	13	14	15	16	17	18	19	20	21	22	23	24	25	26	27 (Final)
USCHO.com	RV	RV	RV	RV	RV	RV	19	13	13	10 (1)	8 (1)	8	–	9	11	10	10	14	14	12	14	14	12	12	9	8		
USA Hockey	RV	NR	NR	NR	NR	RV	20	13	10	10 (1)	7 (1)	7	–	8	10	9	10	13	14	13	12	12	12	12	9	8		

Note: USCHO did not release a poll in week 12.
Note: USA Hockey did not release a poll in week 12.
