= 2025–26 Union Garnet Chargers men's ice hockey season =

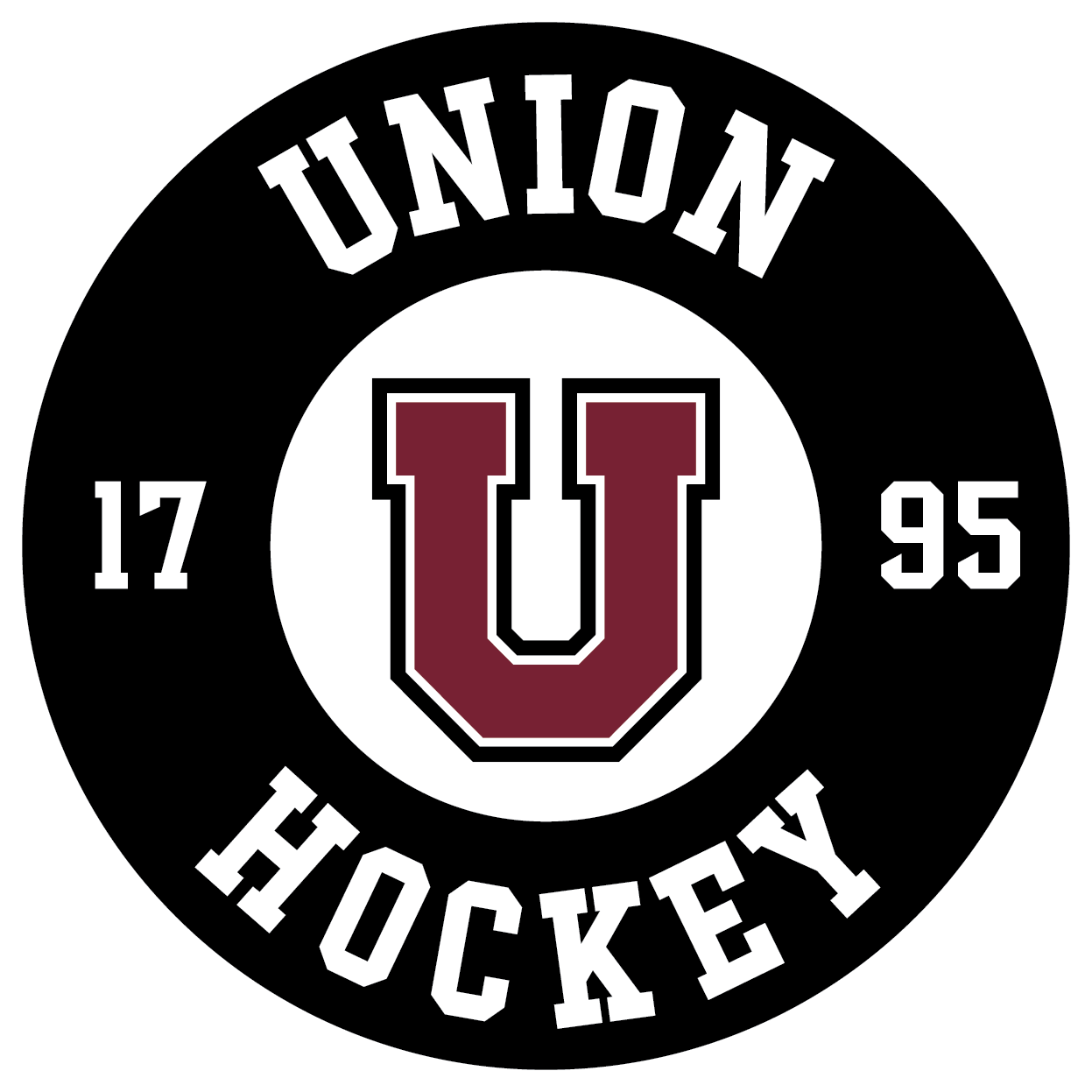
- Conference: ECAC Hockey
- Home ice: M&T Bank Center

Record
- Overall: 22–12–3
- Conference: 11–9–2
- Home: 13–4–2
- Road: 7–7–1
- Neutral: 2–1–0

Coaches and captains
- Head coach: Josh Hauge
- Assistant coaches: John Ronan; Mike Zannella; Bryan McDonald
- Captain: Nick Young

The 2025–26 Union Garnet Chargers men's ice hockey season will be the 85th season of play for the program, the 34th at the Division I level and the 34th in the ECAC Hockey conference. The Garnet Chargers will represent Union College in the 2025–26 NCAA Division I men's ice hockey season, play their home games at M&T Bank Center and be coached by Josh Hauge in his 4th season.

== Departures ==
Player	Position	Nationality	Cause
Kyle Chauvette	Goaltender	United States	Transferred to (New Hampshire)
David Côté	Defenseman	Canada	Left program (retired)
Cullen Ferguson	Defenseman	Canada	Graduation (signed with Fort Wayne Komets)
Lucas Massie	Goaltender	United States	Transferred to (Robert Morris)
Joseph Messina	Defenseman	Canada	Transferred to (Canisius)
Josh Nixon	Forward	Canada	Graduation (signed with Maine Mariners)
Josh Phillips	Defenseman	United States	Transferred to (Canisius)
Eli Pilosof	Forward	Canada	Left program (retired)
John Prokop	Defenseman	United States	Signed professional contract (Toronto Maple Leafs)
Tom Richter	Forward	United States	Graduation (retired)
Joe Sharib	Goaltender	United States	Graduation (signed with Providence Bruins)
Caden Villegas	Forward	United States	Graduation (signed with Adirondack Thunder)

== Recruiting ==
Player	Position	Nationality	Age	Notes
Luke Buss	Forward	United States	22	Columbus, OH; transfer from Wisconsin
Ollie Chessler	Defenseman	United States	21	Watertown, MA
Tyler Dunbar	Defenseman	United States	21	Sault Ste. Marie, MI; transfer from Colorado College
Will Felicio	Defenseman	United States	19	Holden, MA; transfer from Michigan
Brayden Gillespie	Goaltender	Canada	20	Oakville, ON
Brendan Holahan	Goaltender	United States	21	New Canaan, CT
Cameron Korpi	Goaltender	United States	21	South Lyon, MI; transfer from Michigan
Alex Laurenza	Forward	Canada	20	Woodbridge, ON
Étienne Lessard	Defenseman	Canada	21	Blainville, QC
Troy Pelton	Forward	United States	20	Clifton Park, NY
Carter Rose	Defenseman	United States	23	Brasher Falls, NY; transfer from Clarkson

== Roster ==
As of August 10, 2025.

No.	Nat.	Player	Class	Pos	Height	Weight	DoB	Hometown	Previous team	NHL rights
2	(United States)	D. J. Hart	Junior	D	6' 3" (1.91 m)	210 lb (95 kg)	2002-02-23	Stamford, Connecticut	Lincoln Stars (USHL)	—
3	(United States)	Cal Mell	Senior	D	5' 11" (1.8 m)	180 lb (82 kg)	2011-01-30	Alpharetta, Georgia	Janesville Jets (NAHL)	—
4	(United States)	Will Felicio	Sophomore	D	5' 10" (1.78 m)	161 lb (73 kg)	2006-05-19	Holden, Massachusetts	Michigan (Big Ten)	—
5	(United States)	Carter Rose	Junior	D	6' 2" (1.88 m)	195 lb (88 kg)	2002-08-09	Brasher Falls, New York	Clarkson (ECAC)	—
6	(United States)	Troy Pelton	Freshman	F	6' 1" (1.85 m)	185 lb (84 kg)	2004-12-06	Clifton Park, New York	Corpus Christi IceRays (NAHL)	—
7	(United States)	Nick Young (C)	Senior	D	6' 3" (1.91 m)	215 lb (98 kg)	2001-09-12	Raleigh, North Carolina	St. Cloud Norsemen (NAHL)	—
8	(United States)	Connor Smith	Sophomore	F	5' 11" (1.8 m)	172 lb (78 kg)	2003-06-06	Hugo, Minnesota	Oklahoma Warriors (NAHL)	—
9	(United States)	Alex Laurenza	Freshman	F	5' 10" (1.78 m)	165 lb (75 kg)	2005-02-24	Woodbridge, Ontario	Austin Bruins (NAHL)	—
10	(United States)	Ethan Benz	Senior	F	6' 1" (1.85 m)	190 lb (86 kg)	2001-03-29	Shakopee, Minnesota	St. Cloud Norsemen (NAHL)	—
11	(Canada)	Colby MacArthur	Senior	F	6' 3" (1.91 m)	185 lb (84 kg)	2001-11-02	Summerside, Prince Edward Island	Summerside Western Capitals (MHL)	—
12	(United States)	Carter Korpi	Senior	F	6' 0" (1.83 m)	185 lb (84 kg)	2001-07-28	South Lyon, Michigan	Wichita Falls Warriors (NAHL)	—
14	(Canada)	Brandon Buhr	Senior	F	6' 2" (1.88 m)	200 lb (91 kg)	2002-07-07	North Vancouver, British Columbia	Alberni Valley Bulldogs (BCHL)	—
15	(Canada)	Ollie Chessler	Freshman	D	5' 11" (1.8 m)	174 lb (79 kg)	2004-07-09	Watertown, Massachusetts	Bismarck Bobcats (NAHL)	—
16	(Canada)	Lucas Buzziol	Sophomore	F	6' 1" (1.85 m)	194 lb (88 kg)	2004-04-05	Mississauga, Ontario	Alberni Valley Bulldogs (BCHL)	—
17	(United States)	Parker Lindauer	Senior	F	5' 11" (1.8 m)	172 lb (78 kg)	2001-05-17	Madison, Wisconsin	Maine (HEA)	—
18	(United States)	Ben Muthersbaugh	Sophomore	F	5' 11" (1.8 m)	187 lb (85 kg)	2004-02-15	Gilford, New Hampshire	Cedar Rapids RoughRiders (USHL)	—
19	(United States)	Drew Sutton	Sophomore	F	5' 10" (1.78 m)	170 lb (77 kg)	2003-02-10	Hortonville, Wisconsin	Oklahoma Warriors (NAHL)	—
21	(United States)	Tyler Dunbar	Junior	D	6' 1" (1.85 m)	197 lb (89 kg)	2003-12-18	Sault Ste. Marie, Michigan	Colorado College (NCHC)	—
22	(United States)	Jacob Jeannette	Junior	F	6' 1" (1.85 m)	200 lb (91 kg)	2002-12-13	Duluth, Minnesota	Tri-City Storm (USHL)	—
24	(United States)	Nate Hanley	Senior	F	5' 11" (1.8 m)	185 lb (84 kg)	2002-05-30	Rocky Point, New York	Cedar Rapids RoughRiders (USHL)	—
26	(United States)	Brendan Miles	Senior	D	6' 1" (1.85 m)	180 lb (82 kg)	2001-12-12	Farmington Hills, Michigan	Michigan (Big Ten)	—
27	(United States)	Riley Brueck	Sophomore	F	6' 2" (1.88 m)	190 lb (86 kg)	2003-05-07	Chesterfield, Missouri	Oklahoma Warriors (NAHL)	—
28	(Canada)	Étienne Lessard	Freshman	D	5' 9" (1.75 m)	168 lb (76 kg)	2004-03-22	Blainville, Quebec	Lincoln Stars (USHL)	—
29	(Canada)	Brayden Gillespie	Freshman	G	5' 11" (1.8 m)	174 lb (79 kg)	2005-07-23	Oakville, Ontario	Brampton Steelheads (OHL)	—
30	(Canada)	Brendan Holahan	Freshman	G	6' 2" (1.88 m)	181 lb (82 kg)	2004-06-15	New Canaan, Connecticut	El Paso Rhinos (NAHL)	—
31	(United States)	Cameron Korpi	Sophomore	G	6' 4" (1.93 m)	172 lb (78 kg)	2004-05-26	South Lyon, Michigan	Michigan (Big Ten)	—
33	(United States)	Luke Buss	Sophomore	F	5' 10" (1.78 m)	174 lb (79 kg)	2003-02-14	Columbus, Ohio	Wisconsin (Big Ten)	—

== Standings ==
2025–26 ECAC Hockey Standings
	Conference record										Overall record					
	GP	W	L	T	OTW	OTL	SW	PTS	GF	GA	GP	W	L	T	GF	GA
#11 Quinnipiac †	22	17	4	1	2	0	0	50	102	48	38	26	9	3	157	88
#8 Dartmouth *	22	13	5	4	0	1	3	47	81	53	34	23	7	4	124	70
#9 Cornell	22	15	6	1	1	1	1	47	71	42	33	22	10	1	109	64
Princeton	22	11	9	2	0	1	1	37	63	57	34	18	13	3	103	90
Union	22	11	9	2	1	1	1	36	71	68	37	22	12	3	140	98
Harvard	22	11	10	1	0	1	0	35	61	64	34	16	16	2	92	100
Colgate	22	9	10	3	2	0	2	30	68	74	37	13	20	4	99	125
Clarkson	22	9	10	3	2	0	1	29	65	65	38	18	17	3	111	111
Rensselaer	22	8	13	1	0	1	0	26	55	70	35	11	23	1	80	115
Yale	22	7	14	1	2	2	0	22	63	80	31	8	22	1	79	115
St. Lawrence	22	6	15	1	0	0	1	20	59	99	35	7	25	3	85	151
Brown	22	4	16	2	0	2	1	17	44	83	31	5	24	2	63	119
Championship: March 21, 2026 † indicates conference regular season champion (Cleary Cup) * indicates conference tournament champion (Whitelaw Cup); Rankings: USCHO.com Top 20 Poll; updated March 22, 2026

== Schedule and results ==
Date	Time	Opponent^{#}	Rank^{#}	Site	TV	Decision	Result	Attendance	Record
Regular Season
October 4	5:00 pm	Army*		M&T Bank Center • Schenectady, New York	ESPN+	Korpi	T 1–1	2,241	0–0–1
October 5	2:00 pm	vs. Colgate*		Russell Sage Rink • Clinton, New York (Exhibition)	ESPN+		L 3–5		
October 10	7:00 pm	at Mercyhurst*		Mercyhurst Ice Center • Erie, Pennsylvania	FloHockey	Korpi	W 5–2	876	1–0–1
October 11	5:00 pm	at Mercyhurst*		Mercyhurst Ice Center • Erie, Pennsylvania	FloHockey	Korpi	W 5–3	509	2–0–1
October 17	8:00 pm	Niagara*		M&T Bank Center • Schenectady, New York	ESPN+	Korpi	W 3–2	1,712	3–0–1
October 18	8:00 pm	Niagara*		M&T Bank Center • Schenectady, New York	ESPN+	Korpi	W 6–0	1,426	4–0–1
October 31	7:00 pm	Rensselaer		M&T Bank Center • Schenectady, New York (Rivalry)	ESPN+	Korpi	L 2–5	2,034	4–1–1 (0–1–0)
November 1	4:00 pm	at Rensselaer		Houston Field House • Troy, New York (Rivalry)	ESPN+	Korpi	W 3–0	2,710	5–1–1 (1–1–0)
November 7	7:00 pm	Clarkson		M&T Bank Center • Schenectady, New York	ESPN+	Korpi	L 1–5	2,399	5–2–1 (1–2–0)
November 8	7:00 pm	St. Lawrence		M&T Bank Center • Schenectady, New York	ESPN+	Gillespie	W 5–2	2,112	6–2–1 (2–2–0)
November 14	7:00 pm	Massachusetts Lowell*		M&T Bank Center • Schenectady, New York	ESPN+	Korpi	W 7–1	1,979	7–2–1
November 15	5:00 pm	New Hampshire*		M&T Bank Center • Schenectady, New York	ESPN+	Korpi	W 6–0	2,264	8–2–1
November 21	7:00 pm	at #19 Cornell	#20	Lynah Rink • Ithaca, New York	ESPN+	Korpi	L 1–2	3,230	8–3–1 (2–3–0)
November 22	7:00 pm	at Colgate	#20	Class of 1965 Arena • Hamilton, New York	ESPN+	Korpi	T 4–4 ^{SOW}	756	8–3–2 (2–3–1)
Friendship Four
November 28	9:00 am	vs. Sacred Heart*	#20	SSE Arena Belfast • Belfast, Northern Ireland (Friendship Four Semifinal)		Korpi	W 8–1	3,511	9–3–2
November 29	2:00 pm	vs. Miami*	#20	SSE Arena Belfast • Belfast, Northern Ireland (Friendship Four Championship)		Korpi	L 2–3	5,122	9–4–2
December 5	7:00 pm	Princeton		M&T Bank Center • Schenectady, New York	ESPN+	Korpi	L 1–5	1,611	9–5–2 (2–4–1)
December 6	7:00 pm	#8 Quinnipiac		M&T Bank Center • Schenectady, New York	ESPN+	Gillespie	W 4–0	2,276	10–5–2 (3–4–1)
December 12	7:00 pm	Alaska*		M&T Bank Center • Schenectady, New York	ESPN+	Gillespie	W 5–1	1,702	11–5–2
December 13	5:00 pm	Alaska*		M&T Bank Center • Schenectady, New York	ESPN+	Gillespie	W 5–1	2,002	12–5–2
January 3	5:00 pm	Royal Military College*	#20	M&T Bank Center • Schenectady, New York (Exhibition)	ESPN+		W 9–0	2,514	
January 9	7:00 pm	at #8 Quinnipiac		M&T Bank Arena • Hamden, Connecticut	ESPN+	Korpi	L 2–7	2,898	12–6–2 (3–5–1)
January 10	7:00 pm	at #20 Princeton		Hobey Baker Memorial Rink • Princeton, New Jersey	ESPN+	Gillespie	W 2–7	1,877	13–6–2 (4–5–1)
January 16	7:00 pm	Brown		M&T Bank Center • Schenectady, New York	ESPN+	Gillespie	W 4–0	2,247	14–6–2 (5–5–1)
January 17	7:00 pm	Yale		M&T Bank Center • Schenectady, New York	ESPN+	Gillespie	L 1–4	2,156	14–7–2 (5–6–1)
January 19	4:00 pm	at Harvard		Bright-Landry Hockey Center • Boston, Massachusetts	ESPN+	Gillespie	L 0–4	1,778	14–8–2 (5–7–1)
January 24	6:00 pm	vs. Rensselaer*		MVP Arena • Albany, New York (Mayor's Cup)		Korpi	W 5–4 ^{OT}	—	15–8–2
January 30	7:00 pm	at #14 Dartmouth		Thompson Arena • Hanover, New Hampshire	ESPN+	Gillespie	L 2–4	2,390	15–9–2 (5–8–1)
February 6	7:00 pm	at St. Lawrence		Appleton Arena • Canton, New York	ESPN+	Gillespie	W 4–1	637	16–9–2 (6–8–1)
February 7	4:00 pm	at Clarkson		Cheel Arena • Potsdam, New York	ESPN+	Holahan	L 7–8 ^{OT}	2,524	16–10–2 (6–9–1)
February 13	7:00 pm	Colgate		M&T Bank Center • Schenectady, New York	ESPN+	Korpi	W 7–6	2,107	17–10–2 (7–9–1)
February 14	7:00 pm	#9 Cornell		M&T Bank Center • Schenectady, New York	ESPN+	Korpi	W 4–1	2,345	18–10–2 (8–9–1)
February 20	7:00 pm	Harvard		M&T Bank Center • Schenectady, New York	ESPN+	Korpi	W 4–1	2,328	19–10–2 (9–9–1)
February 21	7:00 pm	#14 Dartmouth		M&T Bank Center • Schenectady, New York	ESPN+	Korpi	T 3–3 ^{SOL}	2,455	19–10–3 (9–9–2)
February 27	7:00 pm	at Yale		Ingalls Rink • New Haven, Connecticut	ESPN+	Korpi	W 5–4 ^{OT}	1,608	20–10–3 (10–9–2)
February 28	7:00 pm	at Brown		Meehan Auditorium • Providence, Rhode Island	ESPN+	Korpi	W 3–0	522	21–10–3 (11–9–2)
ECAC Hockey Tournament
March 7	5:00 pm	Brown*		M&T Bank Center • Schenectady, New York (ECAC First Round)	ESPN+	Korpi	W 9–0	2,499	22–10–3
March 13	7:00 pm	at Princeton*	#20	Hobey Baker Memorial Rink • Princeton, New Jersey (ECAC Quarterfinal Game 1)	ESPN+	Korpi	L 2–5	1,427	22–11–3
March 14	7:00 pm	at Princeton*	#20	Hobey Baker Memorial Rink • Princeton, New Jersey (ECAC Quarterfinal Game 2)	ESPN+	Korpi	L 2–5	1,680	22–12–3
*Non-conference game. ^{#}Rankings from USCHO.com Poll. All times are in Eastern Time. Source:

== Rankings ==
Poll	Week																											
Poll	Pre	1	2	3	4	5	6	7	8	9	10	11	12	13	14	15	16	17	18	19	20	21	22	23	24	25	26	27 (Final)
USCHO.com	RV	NR	RV	RV	RV	RV	RV	20	20	RV	RV	20	–	20	RV	RV	RV	RV	RV	NR	RV	RV	RV	20	RV	RV		
USA Hockey	RV	NR	RV	RV	RV	RV	RV	20	RV	RV	RV	RV	–	RV	RV	RV	RV	RV	NR	NR	NR	20	20	20	NR	RV		

Note: USCHO did not release a poll in week 12.
Note: USA Hockey did not release a poll in week 12.
