= 2025–26 Harvard Crimson men's ice hockey season =

- Conference: ECAC Hockey
- Home ice: Bright-Landry Hockey Center

Record
- Overall: 16–16–2
- Conference: 11–10–1
- Home: 10–6–0
- Road: 5–9–2
- Neutral: 1–1–0

Coaches and captains
- Head coach: Ted Donato
- Assistant coaches: James Marcou; Matt Gilroy; Brian Robinson
- Captains: Mason Langenbrunner; Joe Miller

The 2025–26 Harvard Crimson Men's ice hockey season will be the 125th season of play for the program and 64th in ECAC Hockey. The Crimson will represent Harvard University in the 2025–26 NCAA Division I men's ice hockey season, play their home games at Bright-Landry Hockey Center and be coached by Ted Donato in his 21st season.

== Departures ==
Player	Position	Nationality	Cause
Kyle Aucoin	Defenseman	Canada	Graduate transfer to Miami
Jack Bar	Defenseman	Canada	Graduation (retired)
Alex Gaffney	Forward	United States	Graduate transfer to St. Thomas
Christian Jimenez	Defenseman	United States	Graduation (retired)
Zakary Karpa	Forward	United States	Graduation (signed with Hartford Wolf Pack)
Luke Khozozian	Forward	United States	Graduation (retired)
Aku Koskenvuo	Goaltender	Finland	Signed professional contract (Vancouver Canucks)
Tommy Lyons	Forward	United States	Graduation (retired)
Ian Moore	Defenseman	United States	Graduation (signed with Anaheim Ducks)

== Recruiting ==
Player	Position	Nationality	Age	Notes
Matthew Biotti	Defenseman	United States	21	Cambridge, MA
Donato Bracco	Defenseman	United States	18	Locust Valley, NY
Richard Gallant	Forward	United States	18	Concord, MA; selected 210th overall in 2025
Aidan Lane	Forward	Canada	18	Mississauga, ON; selected 176th overall in 2025
James Mackey	Defenseman	United States	19	Villanova, PA
Drake Murray	Defenseman	United States	19	Manhattan Beach, CA
Heikki Ruohonen	Forward	Finland	19	Helsinki, FIN; selected 107th overall in 2024
Chase Stefanek	Forward	United States	19	Yorba Linda, CA

== Roster ==
As of August 28, 2025.

No.	Nat.	Player	Class	Pos	Height	Weight	DoB	Hometown	Previous team	NHL rights
1	(United States)	Evan Zhang	Sophomore	G	6' 1" (1.85 m)	154 lb (70 kg)	2006-02-02	Sherborn, Massachusetts	Roxbury Latin School (US-Prep)	—
2	(United States)	David Hejduk	Junior	D	6' 0" (1.83 m)	194 lb (88 kg)	2004-01-03	Parker, Colorado	Wenatchee Wild (BCHL)	—
3	(United States)	Matthew Biotti	Freshman	D	6' 4" (1.93 m)	181 lb (82 kg)	2004-08-27	Cambridge, Massachusetts	Penticton Vees (BCHL)	—
5	(United States)	Sean Keohane	Sophomore	D	6' 4" (1.93 m)	183 lb (83 kg)	2004-11-04	Boston, Massachusetts	West Kelowna Warriors (BCHL)	BUF, 173rd overall 2023
6	(United States)	Richard Gallant	Freshman	F	5' 8" (1.73 m)	170 lb (77 kg)	2007-06-12	Concord, Massachusetts	USNTDP (USHL)	SJS, 210th overall 2025
7	(United States)	Philip Tresca	Senior	F	6' 0" (1.83 m)	190 lb (86 kg)	2002-04-10	Newton, Massachusetts	Muskegon Lumberjacks (USHL)	—
8	(United States)	Donato Bracco	Freshman	D	5' 10" (1.78 m)	161 lb (73 kg)	2007-07-26	Locust Valley, New York	USNTDP (USHL)	—
9	(United States)	Ryan Healey	Senior	D	6' 0" (1.83 m)	172 lb (78 kg)	2004-05-19	Hull, Massachusetts	Sioux Falls Stampede (USHL)	MIN, 121st overall 2022
10	(United States)	Ryan Fine	Junior	F	5' 9" (1.75 m)	183 lb (83 kg)	2005-03-14	Center Moriches, New York	USNTDP (USHL)	—
11	(United States)	Justin Solovey	Sophomore	F	6' 2" (1.88 m)	209 lb (95 kg)	2004-11-29	Holmdel, New Jersey	Muskegon Lumberjacks (USHL)	—
12	(United States)	Joe Miller (C)	Senior	F	5' 9" (1.75 m)	160 lb (73 kg)	2002-09-15	Minneapolis, Minnesota	Chicago Steel (USHL)	TOR, 180th overall 2020
13	(United States)	Marek Hejduk	Senior	F	6' 0" (1.83 m)	184 lb (83 kg)	2004-01-03	Parker, Colorado	USNTDP (USHL)	—
14	(Canada)	Matthew Morden	Junior	D	6' 4" (1.93 m)	203 lb (92 kg)	2004-07-29	Hamilton, Ontario	Muskegon Lumberjacks (USHL)	UTA, 131st overall 2022
16	(United States)	William McDonough	Sophomore	F	6' 2" (1.88 m)	194 lb (88 kg)	2005-06-18	Duxbury, Massachusetts	Sioux Falls Stampede (USHL)	—
17	(United States)	Will Hughes	Sophomore	F	6' 2" (1.88 m)	183 lb (83 kg)	2003-09-23	Andover, Massachusetts	Green Bay Gamblers (USHL)	—
18	(United States)	Michael Callow	Junior	F	6' 4" (1.93 m)	181 lb (82 kg)	2004-01-15	Boston, Massachusetts	Muskegon Lumberjacks (USHL)	ANA, 154th overall 2022
19	(United States)	Ben MacDonald	Junior	F	6' 0" (1.83 m)	181 lb (82 kg)	2004-02-24	Weston, Massachusetts	West Kelowna Warriors (BCHL)	SEA, 91st overall 2022
20	(United States)	Drake Murray	Freshman	D	6' 1" (1.85 m)	201 lb (91 kg)	2006-03-29	Manhattan Beach, California	Sioux City Musketeers (USHL)	—
21	(Canada)	Cam Johnson	Junior	F	5' 9" (1.75 m)	146 lb (66 kg)	2004-11-28	Vancouver, British Columbia	Chicago Steel (USHL)	—
22	(United States)	Mason Langenbrunner (C)	Senior	D	6' 3" (1.91 m)	179 lb (81 kg)	2002-09-14	Eden Prairie, Minnesota	Fargo Force (USHL)	BOS, 151st overall 2020
23	(United States)	Salvatore Guzzo	Junior	F	5' 11" (1.8 m)	168 lb (76 kg)	2005-04-17	Old Tappan, New Jersey	USNTDP (USHL)	—
24	(United States)	Chase Stefanek	Freshman	F	6' 2" (1.88 m)	192 lb (87 kg)	2006-08-01	Yorba Linda, California	Muskegon Lumberjacks (USHL)	—
26	(United States)	Lucas St. Louis	Sophomore	D	5' 11" (1.8 m)	170 lb (77 kg)	2005-03-30	Burlington, Vermont	Dubuque Fighting Saints (USHL)	—
27	(Canada)	Mick Thompson	Sophomore	F	5' 9" (1.75 m)	170 lb (77 kg)	2004-03-01	Toronto, Ontario	Chicago Steel (USHL)	—
28	(Finland)	Heikki Ruohonen	Freshman	F	6' 2" (1.88 m)	205 lb (93 kg)	2006-06-19	Helsinki, Finland	Dubuque Fighting Saints (USHL)	PHI, 107th overall 2024
29	(United States)	Casey Severo	Senior	F	5' 9" (1.75 m)	177 lb (80 kg)	2001-02-01	Penfield, New York	Madison Capitols (USHL)	—
31	(Canada)	Ben Charette	Sophomore	G	6' 2" (1.88 m)	183 lb (83 kg)	2003-09-23	Aurora, Ontario	Whitecourt Wolverines (AJHL)	—
44	(United States)	James Mackey	Freshman	D	6' 6" (1.98 m)	243 lb (110 kg)	2005-10-15	Villanova, Pennsylvania	Dubuque Fighting Saints (USHL)	—
88	(Canada)	Aidan Lane	Freshman	F	6' 1" (1.85 m)	192 lb (87 kg)	2007-02-04	Mississauga, Ontario	Brampton Steelheads (OHL)	CGY, 176th overall 2025

== Standings ==
2025–26 ECAC Hockey Standings
	Conference record										Overall record					
	GP	W	L	T	OTW	OTL	SW	PTS	GF	GA	GP	W	L	T	GF	GA
#10т Quinnipiac †	22	17	4	1	2	0	0	50	102	48	38	26	9	3	157	88
#9 Dartmouth	22	13	5	4	0	1	3	47	81	53	32	21	7	4	118	69
#8 Cornell	22	15	6	1	1	1	1	47	71	42	32	22	9	1	107	61
Princeton	22	11	9	2	0	1	1	37	63	57	32	17	12	3	99	86
Union	22	11	9	2	1	1	1	36	71	68	37	22	12	3	140	98
Harvard	22	11	10	1	0	1	0	35	61	64	34	16	16	2	92	100
Colgate	22	9	10	3	2	0	2	30	68	74	37	13	20	4	99	125
Clarkson	22	9	10	3	2	0	1	29	65	65	37	18	16	3	111	107
Rensselaer	22	8	13	1	0	1	0	26	55	70	35	11	23	1	80	115
Yale	22	7	14	1	2	2	0	22	63	80	31	8	22	1	79	115
St. Lawrence	22	6	15	1	0	0	1	20	59	99	35	7	25	3	85	151
Brown	22	4	16	2	0	2	1	17	44	83	31	5	24	2	63	119
Championship: March 21, 2026 † indicates conference regular season champion (Cleary Cup) * indicates conference tournament champion (Whitelaw Cup); Rankings: USCHO.com Top 20 Poll; updated March 16, 2026

== Schedule and results ==
Date	Time	Opponent^{#}	Rank^{#}	Site	TV	Decision	Result	Attendance	Record
Exhibition
October 18	7:00 pm	at Northeastern*		Matthews Arena • Boston, Massachusetts (Exhibition)	ESPN+	Zhang	W 4–2	3,976	
Regular Season
October 31	7:00 pm	at #9 Connecticut*		Toscano Family Ice Forum • Storrs, Connecticut	ESPN+	Charette	T 1–1 ^{OT}	2,292	0–0–1
November 4	7:00 pm	Stonehill*		Bright-Landry Hockey Center • Boston, Massachusetts	ESPN+	Charette	W 6–2	1,105	1–0–1
November 7	7:00 pm	#17 Cornell		Bright-Landry Hockey Center • Boston, Massachusetts (Rivalry)	ESPN+	Charette	L 1–3	3,095	1–1–1 (0–1–0)
November 8	7:00 pm	Colgate		Bright-Landry Hockey Center • Boston, Massachusetts	ESPN+	Charette	W 6–5	1,515	2–1–1 (1–1–0)
November 14	7:00 pm	at Clarkson		Appleton Arena • Canton, New York	ESPN+	Charette	W 2–1	2,974	3–1–1 (2–1–0)
November 15	7:00 pm	at St. Lawrence		Cheel Arena • Potsdam, New York	ESPN+	Charette	W 4–3	1,663	4–1–1 (3–1–0)
November 22	7:00 pm	at Vermont*		Gutterson Fieldhouse • Burlington, Vermont	ESPN+	Charette	W 5–1	2,491	5–1–1
November 28	7:00 pm	#1 Michigan*		Bright-Landry Hockey Center • Boston, Massachusetts	ESPN+	Charette	L 1–5	2,883	5–2–1
November 29	7:00 pm	#1 Michigan*		Bright-Landry Hockey Center • Boston, Massachusetts	ESPN+	Charette	L 3–4 ^{OT}	3,095	5–3–1
December 5	7:00 pm	Yale		Bright-Landry Hockey Center • Boston, Massachusetts (Rivalry)	ESPN+	Charette	W 3–2	2,132	6–3–1 (4–1–0)
December 6	7:00 pm	Brown		Bright-Landry Hockey Center • Boston, Massachusetts	ESPN+	Charette	W 7–3	1,300	7–3–1 (5–1–0)
January 2	7:00 pm	at #10 Quinnipiac	#18	M&T Bank Arena • Hamden, Connecticut	ESPN+	Charette	L 1–9	3,070	7–4–1 (5–2–0)
January 3	7:00 pm	at Princeton	#18	Hobey Baker Memorial Rink • Princeton, New Jersey	ESPN+	Charette	L 2–3	2,052	7–5–1 (5–3–0)
January 9	7:00 pm	at #11 Dartmouth		Thompson Arena • Hanover, New Hampshire	ESPN+	Charette	L 4–5	3,773	7–6–1 (5–4–0)
January 12	7:00 pm	#20 Boston University*		Bright-Landry Hockey Center • Boston, Massachusetts	ESPN+	Charette	L 1–4	2,278	7–7–1
January 16	7:00 pm	St. Lawrence		Bright-Landry Hockey Center • Boston, Massachusetts	ESPN+	Charette	W 5–1	1,626	8–7–1 (6–4–0)
January 17	7:00 pm	Clarkson		Bright-Landry Hockey Center • Boston, Massachusetts	ESPN+	Charette	W 2–1	2,296	9–7–1 (7–4–0)
January 19	4:00 pm	Union		Bright-Landry Hockey Center • Boston, Massachusetts	ESPN+	Charette	W 4–0	1,778	10–7–1 (8–4–0)
January 23	7:00 pm	at Colgate		Class of 1965 Arena • Hamilton, New York	ESPN+	Charette	W 3–1	986	11–7–1 (9–4–0)
January 24	7:00 pm	at #12 Cornell		Lynah Rink • Ithaca, New York (Rivalry)	ESPN+	Charette	L 1–4	4,267	11–8–1 (9–5–0)
January 30	7:00 pm	Rensselaer		Bright-Landry Hockey Center • Boston, Massachusetts	ESPN+	Charette	W 3–1	2,143	12–8–1 (10–5–0)
Beanpot
February 2	5:00 pm	vs. #11 Boston College*		TD Garden • Boston, Massachusetts (Beanpot Semifinal)	ESPN+, NESN	Charette	L 1–5	—	12–9–1
February 6	7:00 pm	#14 Dartmouth		Bright-Landry Hockey Center • Boston, Massachusetts	ESPN+	Charette	L 1–3	2,240	12–10–1 (10–6–0)
February 9	4:30 pm	vs. Northeastern*		TD Garden • Boston, Massachusetts (Beanpot Consolation Game)	ESPN+, NESN	Charette	W 4–1	18,258	13–10–1
February 13	7:00 pm	at Brown		Meehan Auditorium • Providence, Rhode Island	ESPN+	Charette	T 2–2 ^{SOL}	778	13–10–2 (10–6–1)
February 14	7:00 pm	at Yale		Ingalls Rink • New Haven, Connecticut (Rivalry)	ESPN+	Charette	L 2–3 ^{OT}	3,002	13–11–2 (10–7–1)
February 20	7:00 pm	at Union		M&T Bank Center • Schenectady, New York	ESPN+	Charette	L 1–4	2,328	13–12–2 (10–8–1)
February 21	7:00 pm	at Rensselaer		Houston Field House • Troy, New York	ESPN+	Charette	L 1–3	4,456	13–13–2 (10–9–1)
February 27	7:00 pm	Princeton		Bright-Landry Hockey Center • Boston, Massachusetts	ESPN+	Charette	W 5–3	2,025	14–13–2 (11–9–1)
February 28	7:00 pm	#7 Quinnipiac		Bright-Landry Hockey Center • Boston, Massachusetts	ESPN+	Charette	L 1–4	1,869	14–14–2 (11–10–1)
ECAC Hockey Tournament
March 6	7:00 pm	St. Lawrence*		Bright-Landry Hockey Center • Boston, Massachusetts (ECAC First Round)	ESPN+	Charette	W 4–3	809	15–14–2
March 13	7:00 pm	at #9 Cornell*		Lynah Rink • Ithaca, New York (ECAC Quarterfinal Game 1, Rivalry)	ESPN+	Charette	W 3–1	4,267	16–14–2
March 14	7:00 pm	at #9 Cornell*		Lynah Rink • Ithaca, New York (ECAC Quarterfinal Game 2, Rivalry)	ESPN+	Charette	L 0–4	4,267	16–15–2
March 15	4:00 pm	at #9 Cornell*		Lynah Rink • Ithaca, New York (ECAC Quarterfinal Game 3, Rivalry)	ESPN+	Charette	L 2–5	4,267	16–16–2
*Non-conference game. ^{#}Rankings from USCHO.com Poll. All times are in Eastern Time. Source:

== Rankings ==
Poll	Week																											
Poll	Pre	1	2	3	4	5	6	7	8	9	10	11	12	13	14	15	16	17	18	19	20	21	22	23	24	25	26	27 (Final)
USCHO.com	RV	RV	NR	RV	NR	RV	RV	RV	RV	RV	18	18	–	18	RV	RV	RV	RV	RV	RV	RV							
USA Hockey	RV	RV	NR	RV	NR	RV	RV	RV	18	20	16	18	–	16	20	RV	RV	RV	RV	RV	RV							

Note: USCHO did not release a poll in week 12.
Note: USA Hockey did not release a poll in week 12.
