= 2025–26 Brown Bears men's ice hockey season =

- Conference: 12th ECAC Hockey
- Home ice: Meehan Auditorium

Rankings
- USCHO: NR
- USA Hockey: NR

Record
- Overall: 5–24–2
- Conference: 4–16–2
- Home: 5–7–2
- Road: 0–17–0

Coaches and captains
- Head coach: Brendan Whittet
- Assistant coaches: Jason Smith; Matt Plante
- Captain(s): Alex Pineau; Ryan St. Louis

The 2025–26 Brown Bears Men's ice hockey season was the 108th season of play for the program and the 64th in the ECAC Hockey conference. The Bears represented Brown University in the 2025–26 NCAA Division I men's ice hockey season, played their home games at the Meehan Auditorium and were coached by Brendan Whittet in his 16th season.

== Departures ==
Player	Position	Nationality	Cause
Tony Andreozzi	Defenseman	United States	Graduation (retired)
Brett Bliss	Defenseman	United States	Graduation (signed with Tahoe Knight Monsters)
Brendan Clark	Forward	United States	Graduation (retired)
Spencer Evans	Forward	United States	Graduation (retired)
Lynden Grandberg	Forward	Canada	Graduation (retired)
Tyler Kopff	Forward	United States	Signed professional contract (Buffalo Sabres)
Jackson Munro	Defenseman	Canada	Graduation (retired)
Wyatt Schlaht	Forward	United States	Graduation (retired)
Max Scott	Forward	United States	Transferred to Maine
Noah Wakeford	Forward	Canada	Graduation (retired)
Lawton Zacher	Goaltender	United States	Transferred to Northeastern

== Recruiting ==
Player	Position	Nationality	Age	Notes
Ashton Bynum	Defenseman	United States	21	Tulsa, OK
Matthew Cataldo	Forward	United States	20	Norfolk, MA
Matthew Desiderio	Defenseman	United States	20	North Caldwell, NJ
Owen Dyer	Defenseman	United States	21	Clarkston, MI
Freddie Halyk	Goaltender	Canada	22	Cochrane, AB; transfer from Denver
Trip Pendy	Forward	United States	20	Far Hills, NJ
Benjamin Poitras	Forward	Canada	20	Montréal, QC; transfer from Northeastern
Michael Salandra	Forward	United States	22	Pleasantville, NY; transfer from Quinnipiac
Brendan Tighe	Forward	United States	18	Birmingham, MI

== Roster ==
As of May 29, 2026.

No.	Nat.	Player	Class	Pos	Height	Weight	DoB	Hometown	Previous team	NHL rights
1	(Canada)	Freddie Halyk	Junior	G	6' 5" (1.96 m)	210 lb (95 kg)	2003-08-27	Cochrane, Alberta	Denver (NCHC)	—
2	(Canada)	Tristan Zarsky	Sophomore	D	6' 3" (1.91 m)	209 lb (95 kg)	2003-01-09	Edmonton, Alberta	El Paso Rhinos (NAHL)	—
3	(Canada)	Alex Pineau (C)	Junior	D	6' 3" (1.91 m)	205 lb (93 kg)	2003-01-21	Thunder Bay, Ontario	Des Moines Buccaneers (USHL)	—
5	(United States)	Nick Traggio	Senior	D	6' 2" (1.88 m)	210 lb (95 kg)	2001-08-01	Sharon, Connecticut	Bonnyville Pontiacs (AJHL)	—
6	(United States)	Harry Meirowitz	Junior	D	6' 0" (1.83 m)	185 lb (84 kg)	2003-05-21	Old Westbury, New York	P.A.L. Junior Islanders (NCDC)	—
7	(Russia)	Ivan Zadvernyuk	Sophomore	F	6' 3" (1.91 m)	190 lb (86 kg)	2004-04-12	Moscow, Russia	Lone Star Brahmas (NAHL)	—
8	(Canada)	Ryan Shostak	Senior	F	6' 0" (1.83 m)	190 lb (86 kg)	2001-09-08	Calgary, Alberta	Vernon Vipers (BCHL)	—
9	(United States)	Ryan St. Louis (C)	Senior	F	5' 10" (1.78 m)	170 lb (77 kg)	2003-06-13	Old Greenwich, Connecticut	Dubuque Fighting Saints (USHL)	—
10	(United States)	Ashton Bynum	Freshman	D	6' 4" (1.93 m)	201 lb (91 kg)	2004-06-25	Tulsa, Oklahoma	Austin Bruins (NAHL)	—
11	(United States)	Trip Pendy	Freshman	F	6' 1" (1.85 m)	201 lb (91 kg)	2005-01-07	Far Hills, New Jersey	Coquitlam Express (BCHL)	—
12	(Canada)	Ben Poitras	Sophomore	F	5' 11" (1.8 m)	181 lb (82 kg)	2005-07-18	Montreal, Quebec	Northeastern (HEA)	—
13	(United States)	Michael Salandra	Sophomore	F	5' 10" (1.78 m)	187 lb (85 kg)	2003-06-13	Pleasantville, New York	Quinnipiac (ECAC)	—
14	(United States)	Brendan Tighe	Freshman	F	5' 11" (1.8 m)	187 lb (85 kg)	2006-08-14	Birmingham, Michigan	Madison Capitols (USHL)	—
15	(Canada)	Charlie Gollob	Sophomore	F	6' 2" (1.88 m)	201 lb (91 kg)	2004-02-10	Toronto, Ontario	Victoria Grizzlies (BCHL)	—
16	(United States)	Owen Dyer	Freshman	D	6' 3" (1.91 m)	225 lb (102 kg)	2004-05-07	Clarkston, Michigan	Des Moines Buccaneers (USHL)	—
17	(United States)	Mike Cataldo	Junior	F	6' 1" (1.85 m)	200 lb (91 kg)	2003-05-04	Norfolk, Massachusetts	Bonnyville Pontiacs (AJHL)	—
18	(United States)	Dean Bauchiero	Senior	F	6' 4" (1.93 m)	215 lb (98 kg)	2002-03-04	Southington, Connecticut	Wichita Falls Warriors (NAHL)	—
19	(United States)	Matthew Brille	Junior	F	5' 10" (1.78 m)	180 lb (82 kg)	2003-01-02	Bethesda, Maryland	Chippewa Steel (NAHL)	—
21	(United States)	Matthew Cataldo	Freshman	F	6' 0" (1.83 m)	205 lb (93 kg)	2005-05-19	Norfolk, Massachusetts	Penticton Vees (BCHL)	—
22	(Canada)	Ethan Mistry	Junior	D	5' 10" (1.78 m)	175 lb (79 kg)	2003-02-04	Toronto, Ontario	Nanaimo Clippers (BCHL)	—
23	(United States)	Matt Desiderio	Freshman	D	6' 3" (1.91 m)	209 lb (95 kg)	2005-08-16	North Caldwell, New Jersey	Dubuque Fighting Saints (USHL)	—
25	(United States)	Zackary Tonelli	Senior	F	5' 9" (1.75 m)	170 lb (77 kg)	2002-02-14	Greenwich, Connecticut	Vernon Vipers (BCHL)	—
26	(United States)	Leo Schwartz	Sophomore	F	6' 0" (1.83 m)	174 lb (79 kg)	2004-10-05	New York, New York	New Jersey Titans (NAHL)	—
27	(Canada)	Jack Hewitt	Sophomore	D	5' 11" (1.8 m)	176 lb (80 kg)	2003-07-01	Toronto, Ontario	P.A.L. Junior Islanders (NCDC)	—
28	(United States)	Tanner Hartman	Senior	F	6' 0" (1.83 m)	168 lb (76 kg)	2001-10-10	Chicago, Illinois	Hobart (NEHC)	—
29	(United States)	Andrew King	Sophomore	F	6' 0" (1.83 m)	165 lb (75 kg)	2003-04-28	Dubuque, Iowa	Dubuque Fighting Saints (USHL)	—
31	(United States)	Ryan Kazmouz	Junior	G	6' 0" (1.83 m)	170 lb (77 kg)	2003-08-30	Livonia, Michigan	Saint Sebastian's School (US-Prep)	—
35	(United States)	Tyler Shea	Senior	G	5' 11" (1.8 m)	170 lb (77 kg)	2001-08-03	Stevenson Ranch, California	Michigan (Big Ten)	—
55	(United States)	Brian Nicholas	Sophomore	F	6' 1" (1.85 m)	192 lb (87 kg)	2005-03-15	Scarsdale, New York	Sioux City Musketeers (USHL)	—

== Standings ==
2025–26 ECAC Hockey Standings
	Conference record										Overall record					
	GP	W	L	T	OTW	OTL	SW	PTS	GF	GA	GP	W	L	T	GF	GA
#8 Quinnipiac †	22	17	4	1	2	0	0	50	102	48	40	27	10	3	162	95
#10 Dartmouth *	22	13	5	4	0	1	3	47	81	53	35	23	8	4	125	75
#12 Cornell	22	15	6	1	1	1	1	47	71	42	34	22	11	1	109	69
Princeton	22	11	9	2	0	1	1	37	63	57	34	18	13	3	103	90
Union	22	11	9	2	1	1	1	36	71	68	37	22	12	3	140	98
Harvard	22	11	10	1	0	1	0	35	61	64	34	16	16	2	92	100
Colgate	22	9	10	3	2	0	2	30	68	74	37	13	20	4	99	125
Clarkson	22	9	10	3	2	0	1	29	65	65	38	18	17	3	111	111
Rensselaer	22	8	13	1	0	1	0	26	55	70	35	11	23	1	80	115
Yale	22	7	14	1	2	2	0	22	63	80	31	8	22	1	79	115
St. Lawrence	22	6	15	1	0	0	1	20	59	99	35	7	25	3	85	151
Brown	22	4	16	2	0	2	1	17	44	83	31	5	24	2	63	119
Championship: March 21, 2026 † indicates conference regular season champion (Cleary Cup) * indicates conference tournament champion (Whitelaw Cup); Rankings: USCHO.com Top 20 Poll; updated April 15, 2026

== Schedule and results ==
Date	Time	Opponent^{#}	Rank^{#}	Site	TV	Decision	Result	Attendance	Record
Regular Season
October 31	9:05 pm	at Air Force*		Cadet Ice Arena • Air Force Academy, Colorado	FloHockey	Shea	L 0–2	2,347	0–1–0
November 1	7:05 pm	at Air Force*		Cadet Ice Arena • Air Force Academy, Colorado	FloHockey	Shea	L 3–4	2,398	0–2–0
November 7	7:00 pm	Princeton		Meehan Auditorium • Providence, Rhode Island	ESPN+	Shea	W 2–1	729	1–2–0 (1–0–0)
November 8	7:00 pm	#5 Quinnipiac		Meehan Auditorium • Providence, Rhode Island	ESPN+	Shea	L 3–4 ^{OT}	772	1–3–0 (1–1–0)
November 14	7:00 pm	at #20 Cornell		Lynah Rink • Ithaca, New York	ESPN+	Shea	L 1–4	4,267	1–4–0 (1–2–0)
November 15	7:00 pm	at Colgate		Class of 1965 Arena • Hamilton, New York	ESPN+	Shea	L 0–4	790	1–5–0 (1–3–0)
November 19	7:00 pm	Alaska Anchorage*		Meehan Auditorium • Providence, Rhode Island	ESPN+	Halyk	W 5–2	529	2–5–0
November 21	7:00 pm	Yale		Meehan Auditorium • Providence, Rhode Island	ESPN+	Halyk	W 4–2	642	3–5–0 (2–3–0)
November 22	7:00 pm	at Yale		Ingalls Rink • New Haven, Connecticut	ESPN+	Shea	L 1–3	1,145	3–6–0 (2–4–0)
November 29	4:00 pm	at #11 Northeastern*		Matthews Arena • Boston, Massachusetts	ESPN+	Halyk	L 1–4	3,109	3–7–0
December 5	7:00 pm	at #10 Dartmouth		Thompson Arena • Hanover, New Hampshire	ESPN+	Shea	L 3–7	1,751	3–8–0 (2–5–0)
December 6	7:00 pm	at Harvard		Bright-Landry Hockey Center • Boston, Massachusetts	ESPN+	Halyk	L 3–7	1,300	3–9–0 (2–6–0)
December 9	7:00 pm	#16 Providence*		Meehan Auditorium • Providence, Rhode Island (Mayor's Cup)	ESPN+	Shea	L 2–4	1,247	3–10–0
December 28	2:00 pm	at Princeton*		Hobey Baker Memorial Rink • Princeton, New Jersey	ESPN+	Shea	L 4–5 ^{OT}	2,186	3–11–0
January 3	7:00 pm	Merrimack*		Meehan Auditorium • Providence, Rhode Island	ESPN+	Halyk	L 2–3	538	3–12–0
January 9	7:00 pm	Clarkson		Meehan Auditorium • Providence, Rhode Island	ESPN+	Halyk	L 2–3	525	3–13–0 (2–7–0)
January 10	4:00 pm	St. Lawrence		Meehan Auditorium • Providence, Rhode Island	ESPN+	Shea	W 4–1	628	4–13–0 (3–7–0)
January 16	7:00 pm	at Union		M&T Bank Center • Schenectady, New York	ESPN+	Shea	L 0–4	2,247	4–14–0 (3–8–0)
January 17	4:00 pm	at Rensselaer		Houston Field House • Troy, New York	ESPN+	Shea	L 1–4	1,702	4–15–0 (3–9–0)
January 24	7:00 pm	at Stonehill*		Warrior Ice Arena • Boston, Massachusetts		Shea	L 2–3 ^{OT}	287	4–16–0
January 30	7:00 pm	Colgate		Meehan Auditorium • Providence, Rhode Island	ESPN+	Shea	T 3–3 ^{SOL}	672	4–16–1 (3–9–1)
January 31	5:00 pm	#10 Cornell		Meehan Auditorium • Providence, Rhode Island	ESPN+	Shea	L 2–4	1,422	4–17–1 (3–10–1)
February 6	7:00 pm	at #5 Quinnipiac		M&T Bank Arena • Hamden, Connecticut	ESPN+	Shea	L 1–9	2,895	4–18–1 (3–11–1)
February 7	7:00 pm	at Princeton		Hobey Baker Memorial Rink • Princeton, New Jersey	ESPN+	Shea	L 3–5	1,939	4–19–1 (3–12–1)
February 13	7:00 pm	Harvard		Meehan Auditorium • Providence, Rhode Island	ESPN+	Shea	T 2–2 ^{SOW}	778	4–19–2 (3–12–2)
February 14	4:00 pm	#12 Dartmouth		Meehan Auditorium • Providence, Rhode Island	ESPN+	Shea	W 4–3	756	5–19–2 (4–12–2)
February 20	7:00 pm	at St. Lawrence		Appleton Arena • Canton, New York	ESPN+	Shea	L 1–3	517	5–20–2 (4–13–2)
February 21	4:00 pm	at Clarkson		Cheel Arena • Potsdam, New York	ESPN+	Shea	L 3–4 ^{OT}	2,467	5–21–2 (4–14–2)
February 27	7:00 pm	Rensselaer		Meehan Auditorium • Providence, Rhode Island	ESPN+	Shea	L 1–3	337	5–22–2 (4–15–2)
February 28	7:00 pm	Union		Meehan Auditorium • Providence, Rhode Island	ESPN+	Shea	L 0–3	522	5–23–2 (4–16–2)
ECAC Hockey Tournament
March 7	5:00 pm	at Union*		M&T Bank Center • Schenectady, New York (ECAC First Round)	ESPN+	Shea	L 0–9	2,499	5–24–2
*Non-conference game. ^{#}Rankings from USCHO.com Poll. All times are in Eastern Time. Source:

== Rankings ==
Poll	Week																											
Poll	Pre	1	2	3	4	5	6	7	8	9	10	11	12	13	14	15	16	17	18	19	20	21	22	23	24	25	26	27 (Final)
USCHO.com	NR	NR	NR	NR	NR	NR	NR	NR	NR	NR	NR	NR	–	NR	NR	NR	NR	NR	NR	NR	NR	NR	NR	NR	NR	NR	–	NR
USA Hockey	NR	NR	NR	NR	NR	NR	NR	NR	NR	NR	NR	NR	–	NR	NR	NR	NR	NR	NR	NR	NR	NR	NR	NR	NR	NR	NR	NR

Note: USCHO did not release a poll in week 12 or 26.
Note: USA Hockey did not release a poll in week 12.
