= 2025–26 Colgate Raiders men's ice hockey season =

- Conference: ECAC Hockey
- Home ice: Class of 1965 Arena

Record
- Overall: 13–20–4
- Conference: 9–10–3
- Home: 8–7–1
- Road: 5–13–3

Coaches and captains
- Head coach: Mike Harder
- Assistant coaches: Zach Badalamenti; Anthony Walsh; Chris Nell

The 2025–26 Colgate Raiders Men's ice hockey season will be the 96th season of play for the program and the 65th in the ECAC Hockey conference. The Raiders will represent Colgate University in the 2025–26 NCAA Division I men's ice hockey season, play their home games at the Class of 1965 Arena and be coached by Mike Harder in his 3rd season.

== Departures ==
Player	Position	Nationality	Cause
Nic Belpedio	Defenseman	United States	Graduate transfer to Ferris State
Tommy Bergsland	Defenseman	United States	Graduation (signed with Texas Stars)
Brett Chorske	Forward	United States	Graduation (signed with Charlotte Checkers)
Alex DiPaolo	Forward	Canada	Graduation (signed with Maine Mariners)
Dominic Foglia	Defenseman	United States	Transferred to Alaska Anchorage
Reid Irwin	Defenseman/Forward	Canada	Graduation (signed with Wichita Thunder)
Ben Raymond	Forward	United States	Graduation (signed with Iowa Heartlanders)

== Recruiting ==
Player	Position	Nationality	Age	Notes
Tyson Doucette	Forward	United States	21	Sault Ste. Marie, ON
Reid Dyck	Goaltender	Canada	21	Winkler, MB; selected 183rd overall in 2022.
Luke Malboeuf	Defenseman	United States	20	Monroeville, PA
Joshua Niedermayer	Defenseman	United States	21	Newport Beach, CA; played previously at Arizona State
Isaiah Norlin	Defenseman	United States	22	Minneapolis, MN; transfer from Omaha
Davide Patella	Forward	Canada	21	Laval, QC
Easton Wainwright	Forward	Canada	20	Mount Hope, ON

== Roster ==
As of August 6, 2025.

No.	Nat.	Player	Class	Pos	Height	Weight	DoB	Hometown	Previous team	NHL rights
1	(United States)	Andrew Takacs	Senior	G	6' 2" (1.88 m)	190 lb (86 kg)	2001-02-27	Bowie, Maryland	New Jersey Titans (NAHL)	—
3	(Canada)	Michael Neumeier	Senior	D	6' 2" (1.88 m)	203 lb (92 kg)	2003-02-27	Kerrobert, Saskatchewan	Bismarck Bobcats (NAHL)	—
5	(United States)	Jacob Napier	Junior	D	6' 2" (1.88 m)	190 lb (86 kg)	2003-03-31	Lancaster, New York	Western Michigan (NCHC)	—
6	(United States)	Bobby Metz	Senior	D	5' 9" (1.75 m)	178 lb (81 kg)	2001-08-20	Bloomfield Hills, Michigan	Minnesota Wilderness (NAHL)	—
7	(Canada)	Simon Labelle	Senior	F	5' 10" (1.78 m)	175 lb (79 kg)	2002-09-03	Ottawa, Ontario	Prince George Spruce Kings (BCHL)	—
9	(United States)	Isaiah Norlin	Sophomore	D	6' 6" (1.98 m)	205 lb (93 kg)	2003-04-21	Minneapolis, Minnesota	Omaha (NCHC)	—
10	(Italy)	Simone Dadiè	Sophomore	F	6' 2" (1.88 m)	205 lb (93 kg)	2003-02-27	Brunico, Italy	Powell River Kings (BCHL)	—
11	(United States)	Antonio Fernandez	Junior	D	5' 8" (1.73 m)	179 lb (81 kg)	2003-10-11	San Jose, California	Colorado College (NCHC)	—
12	(Canada)	Daniel Panetta	Senior	F	5' 10" (1.78 m)	175 lb (79 kg)	2001-05-20	Belleville, Ontario	Salmon Arm Silverbacks (BCHL)	—
13	(United States)	Max Nagel	Sophomore	F	5' 8" (1.73 m)	161 lb (73 kg)	2004-06-30	West St. Paul, Minnesota	Madison Capitols (USHL)	—
14	(United States)	Jack Brandt	Sophomore	F	5' 10" (1.78 m)	170 lb (77 kg)	2004-06-14	Columbus, Ohio	Madison Capitols (USHL)	—
16	(Canada)	Ryan Sullivan	Junior	F	6' 2" (1.88 m)	190 lb (86 kg)	2002-05-15	Calgary, Alberta	Camrose Kodiaks (AJHL)	—
19	(United States)	Ryan Spinale	Sophomore	F	6' 6" (1.98 m)	216 lb (98 kg)	2004-02-09	Plymouth, Massachusetts	Lincoln Stars (USHL)	—
20	(Canada)	Easton Wainwright	Freshman	F	5' 10" (1.78 m)	190 lb (86 kg)	2005-01-19	Mount Hope, Ontario	Sarnia Sting (OHL)	—
21	(United States)	Niko Rexine	Junior	F	6' 2" (1.88 m)	195 lb (88 kg)	2002-06-20	Syracuse, New York	Muskegon Lumberjacks (USHL)	—
22	(United States)	Robby Newton	Senior	F	5' 9" (1.75 m)	190 lb (86 kg)	2001-07-16	Milwaukee, Wisconsin	Wisconsin (Big Ten)	—
23	(United States)	Owen Neuharth	Senior	F	5' 11" (1.8 m)	177 lb (80 kg)	2001-10-25	Savage, Minnesota	Fairbanks Ice Dogs (NAHL)	—
24	(United States)	Jake Schneider	Junior	F	5' 11" (1.8 m)	198 lb (90 kg)	2002-12-24	Plymouth, Minnesota	Prince George Spruce Kings (BCHL)	—
25	(Canada)	Tyson Doucette	Freshman	F	6' 0" (1.83 m)	181 lb (82 kg)	2004-01-30	Sault Ste. Marie, Ontario	Sarnia Sting (OHL)	—
26	(United States)	Joshua Niedermayer	Sophomore	D	6' 0" (1.83 m)	200 lb (91 kg)	2004-02-20	Newport Beach, California	Dubuque Fighting Saints (USHL)	—
27	(Canada)	Brett Merner	Sophomore	D	6' 1" (1.85 m)	181 lb (82 kg)	2004-01-11	Nanaimo, British Columbia	Nanaimo Clippers (USHL)	—
28	(United States)	Luke Malboeuf	Freshman	D	6' 0" (1.83 m)	190 lb (86 kg)	2005-01-07	Monroeville, Pennsylvania	Dubuque Fighting Saints (USHL)	—
29	(United States)	Davide Patella	Freshman	F	6' 2" (1.88 m)	194 lb (88 kg)	2004-01-06	Laval, Quebec	Brooks Bandits (BCHL)	—
30	(United States)	Nick Haas	Senior	G	6' 4" (1.93 m)	195 lb (88 kg)	2001-11-11	Buffalo, New York	Chippewa Steel (NAHL)	—
35	(United States)	Jack Olson	Sophomore	G	6' 1" (1.85 m)	174 lb (79 kg)	2003-03-28	St. Louis Park, Minnesota	Boston Jr. Bruins (NCDC)	—
37	(Canada)	Reid Dyck	Freshman	G	6' 4" (1.93 m)	196 lb (89 kg)	2004-01-20	Winkler, Manitoba	Swift Current Broncos (WHL)	BOS, 183rd overall 2022

== Standings ==
2025–26 ECAC Hockey Standings
	Conference record										Overall record					
	GP	W	L	T	OTW	OTL	SW	PTS	GF	GA	GP	W	L	T	GF	GA
#10т Quinnipiac †	22	17	4	1	2	0	0	50	102	48	38	26	9	3	157	88
#9 Dartmouth	22	13	5	4	0	1	3	47	81	53	32	21	7	4	118	69
#8 Cornell	22	15	6	1	1	1	1	47	71	42	32	22	9	1	107	61
Princeton	22	11	9	2	0	1	1	37	63	57	32	17	12	3	99	86
Union	22	11	9	2	1	1	1	36	71	68	37	22	12	3	140	98
Harvard	22	11	10	1	0	1	0	35	61	64	34	16	16	2	92	100
Colgate	22	9	10	3	2	0	2	30	68	74	37	13	20	4	99	125
Clarkson	22	9	10	3	2	0	1	29	65	65	37	18	16	3	111	107
Rensselaer	22	8	13	1	0	1	0	26	55	70	35	11	23	1	80	115
Yale	22	7	14	1	2	2	0	22	63	80	31	8	22	1	79	115
St. Lawrence	22	6	15	1	0	0	1	20	59	99	35	7	25	3	85	151
Brown	22	4	16	2	0	2	1	17	44	83	31	5	24	2	63	119
Championship: March 21, 2026 † indicates conference regular season champion (Cleary Cup) * indicates conference tournament champion (Whitelaw Cup); Rankings: USCHO.com Top 20 Poll; updated March 16, 2026

== Schedule and results ==
Date	Time	Opponent^{#}	Rank^{#}	Site	TV	Decision	Result	Attendance	Record
Exhibition
October 5	2:00 pm	vs. Union*		Russell Sage Rink • Clinton, New York (Exhibition)			W 5–3		
Regular Season
October 10	7:00 pm	at #3 Boston University*		Agganis Arena • Boston, Massachusetts	ESPN+	Dyck	L 2–6	4,126	0–1–0
October 11	7:00 pm	at #3 Boston University*		Agganis Arena • Boston, Massachusetts	ESPN+	Takacs	T 2–2 ^{OT}	3,726	0–1–1
October 17	7:00 pm	Canisius*		Class of 1965 Arena • Hamilton, New York	ESPN+	Takacs	L 2–4	901	0–2–1
October 18	7:00 pm	Canisius*		Class of 1965 Arena • Hamilton, New York	ESPN+	Dyck	W 5–3	714	1–2–1
October 24	7:00 pm	at #10 Maine*		Alfond Arena • Orono, Maine	ESPN+	Dyck	W 3–2	4,980	2–2–1
October 25	7:00 pm	at #10 Maine*		Alfond Arena • Orono, Maine	ESPN+	Takacs	L 2–3 ^{OT}	4,980	2–3–1
October 31	7:30 pm	RIT*		Class of 1965 Arena • Hamilton, New York	ESPN+	Dyck	L 1–3	1,669	2–4–1
November 1	7:30 pm	RIT*		Class of 1965 Arena • Hamilton, New York	ESPN+, SNY	Dyck	L 1–4	1,502	2–5–1
November 7	7:00 pm	at Dartmouth		Thompson Arena • Hanover, New Hampshire	ESPN+	Dyck	L 1–4	1,795	2–6–1 (0–1–0)
November 8	7:00 pm	at Harvard		Bright-Landry Hockey Center • Boston, Massachusetts	ESPN+	Dyck	L 5–6	1,515	2–7–1 (0–2–0)
November 14	7:30 pm	Yale		Class of 1965 Arena • Hamilton, New York	ESPN+	Dyck	W 4–3 ^{OT}	924	3–7–1 (1–2–0)
November 15	7:00 pm	Brown		Class of 1965 Arena • Hamilton, New York	ESPN+	Dyck	W 5–2	790	4–7–1 (2–2–0)
November 21	7:00 pm	Rensselaer		Class of 1965 Arena • Hamilton, New York	ESPN+	Dyck	W 2–1	693	5–7–1 (3–2–0)
November 22	7:00 pm	#20 Union		Class of 1965 Arena • Hamilton, New York	ESPN+	Dyck	T 4–4 ^{SOL}	756	5–7–2 (3–2–1)
November 26	7:00 pm	at #3 Michigan State*		Munn Ice Arena • East Lansing, Michigan		Dyck	L 2–5	6,555	5–8–2
November 28	7:00 pm	at #3 Michigan State*		Munn Ice Arena • East Lansing, Michigan		Dyck	L 1–4	6,555	5–9–2
December 5	7:00 pm	at St. Lawrence		Appleton Arena • Canton, New York	ESPN+	Dyck	W 4–2	681	6–9–2 (4–2–1)
December 6	7:00 pm	at Clarkson		Cheel Arena • Potsdam, New York	ESPN+	Dyck	L 3–5	2,643	6–10–2 (4–3–1)
January 3	7:00 pm	at New Hampshire*		Whittemore Center • Durham, New Hampshire	ESPN+	Dyck	W 3–2	4,739	7–10–2
January 4	7:00 pm	at New Hampshire*		Whittemore Center • Durham, New Hampshire	ESPN+	Dyck	L 2–3	2,918	7–11–2
January 16	7:00 pm	#7 Quinnipiac		Class of 1965 Arena • Hamilton, New York	ESPN+, SNY	Dyck	L 1–5	855	7–12–2 (4–4–1)
January 17	7:00 pm	#18 Princeton		Class of 1965 Arena • Hamilton, New York	ESPN+	Takacs	W 2–0	869	8–12–2 (5–4–1)
January 23	7:00 pm	Harvard		Class of 1965 Arena • Hamilton, New York	ESPN+	Takacs	L 1–3	986	8–13–2 (5–5–1)
January 24	7:00 pm	#10 Dartmouth		Class of 1965 Arena • Hamilton, New York	ESPN+	Dyck	W 5–2	882	9–13–2 (6–5–1)
January 30	7:00 pm	at Brown		Meehan Auditorium • Providence, Rhode Island	ESPN+	Dyck	T 3–3 ^{SOW}	672	9–13–3 (6–5–2)
January 31	7:00 pm	at Yale		Ingalls Rink • New Haven, Connecticut	ESPN+	Takacs	W 6–3	2,112	10–13–3 (7–5–2)
February 6	7:00 pm	#9 Cornell		Class of 1965 Arena • Hamilton, New York	ESPN+	Takacs	L 2–5	2,222	10–14–3 (7–6–2)
February 7	7:00 pm	at #9 Cornell		Lynah Rink • Ithaca, New York	ESPN+	Dyck	W 3–2 ^{OT}	4,267	11–14–3 (8–6–2)
February 13	7:00 pm	at Union		M&T Bank Center • Schenectady, New York	ESPN+	Dyck	L 6–7	2,107	11–15–3 (8–7–2)
February 14	7:00 pm	at Rensselaer		Houston Field House • Troy, New York	ESPN+	Takacs	L 1–6	1,875	11–16–3 (8–8–2)
February 20	7:00 pm	at Princeton		Hobey Baker Memorial Rink • Princeton, New Jersey	ESPN+	Dyck	T 1–1 ^{SOW}	1,881	11–16–4 (8–8–3)
February 21	7:00 pm	at #5 Quinnipiac		M&T Bank Arena • Hamden, Connecticut	ESPN+	Dyck	L 2–5	3,223	11–17–4 (8–9–3)
February 27	7:00 pm	Clarkson		Class of 1965 Arena • Hamilton, New York	ESPN+	Dyck	L 1–4	700	11–18–4 (8–10–3)
February 28	7:00 pm	St. Lawrence		Class of 1965 Arena • Hamilton, New York	ESPN+	Takacs	W 7–3	1,028	12–18–4 (9–10–3)
ECAC Hockey Tournament
March 7	7:00 pm	Yale*		Class of 1965 Arena • Hamilton, New York (ECAC First Round)	ESPN+	Dyck	W 3–2	1,195	13–18–4
March 13	7:00 pm	at #12 Dartmouth*		Thompson Arena • Hanover, New Hampshire (ECAC Quarterfinal Game 1)	ESPN+	Dyck	L 1–4	2,474	13–19–4
March 14	7:00 pm	at #12 Dartmouth*		Thompson Arena • Hanover, New Hampshire (ECAC Quarterfinal Game 2)	ESPN+	Dyck	L 1–4	2,787	13–20–4
*Non-conference game. ^{#}Rankings from USCHO.com Poll. All times are in Eastern Time. Source:

== Rankings ==
Poll	Week																											
Poll	Pre	1	2	3	4	5	6	7	8	9	10	11	12	13	14	15	16	17	18	19	20	21	22	23	24	25	26	27 (Final)
USCHO.com	RV	NR	NR	NR	NR	NR	NR	NR	NR	NR	NR	NR	–															
USA Hockey	NR	NR	NR	NR	RV	NR	NR	NR	NR	NR	NR	NR	–															

Note: USCHO did not release a poll in week 12.
Note: USA Hockey did not release a poll in week 12.
