= 2025–26 Cornell Big Red men's ice hockey season =

NCAA Tournament, Regional Semifinal
- Conference: ECAC Hockey
- Home ice: Lynah Rink

Rankings
- USCHO: #12
- USA Hockey: #12

Record
- Overall: 22–11–1
- Conference: 15–6–1
- Home: 15–3–0
- Road: 7–5–1
- Neutral: 0–3–0

Coaches and captains
- Head coach: Casey Jones
- Assistant coaches: Sean Flanagan; Chris Brown; Cam Clarke

The 2025–26 Cornell Big Red Men's ice hockey season was the 109th season of play for the program and 64th in ECAC Hockey. The Big Red represented Cornell University in the 2025–26 NCAA Division I men's ice hockey season, played their home games at Lynah Rink and were coached by Casey Jones in his first season.

== Departures ==
Player	Position	Nationality	Cause
Dalton Bancroft	Forward	Canada	Signed professional contract (Boston Bruins)
Hank Kempf	Defenseman	United States	Graduation (signed with Colorado Eagles)
Kyler Kovich	Forward	Canada	Graduate transfer to Minnesota Duluth
Jack O'Leary	Forward	United States	Graduation (signed with Norfolk Admirals)
Sullivan Mack	Forward	United States	Graduation (signed with Hartford Wolf Pack)
Kyle Penney	Forward	Canada	Graduation (retired)
Ondřej Pšenička	Forward	Czech Republic	Graduation (signed with HC Škoda Plzeň)
Jimmy Rayhill	Defenseman	United States	Graduation (retired)
Tim Rego	Defenseman	United States	Graduation (signed with Greenville Swamp Rabbits)
Ben Robertson	Defenseman	United States	Transferred to Michigan
Ian Shane	Goaltender	United States	Graduation (signed with Norfolk Admirals)
Liam Steele	Defenseman	England	Signed professional contract (Sheffield Steelers)
Michael Suda	Defenseman	United States	Graduation (signed with Savannah Ghost Pirates)

== Recruiting ==
Player	Position	Nationality	Age	Notes
Connor Arseneault	Forward	Canada	19	Saint John, NB
Luke Ashton	Defenseman	Canada	20	North Vancouver, BC; transfer from Minnesota State; selected 165th overall in 2024
Alexis Cournoyer	Goaltender	Canada	19	Trois-Rivières, QC; selected 145th overall in 2025
Gio DiGiulian	Forward	United States	20	South Burlington, VT
Michael Fisher	Defenseman	United States	21	Westborough, MA; selected 76th overall in 2022
Hudson Gorski	Defenseman	United States	20	Scotch Plains, NJ
Donovan Hamilton	Defenseman	United States	18	Buffalo, NY
Reegan Hiscock	Forward	Canada	21	St. John's, NL
Aiden Long	Forward	Canada	20	Mono, ON
Luke McCrady	Defenseman	Canada	19	Calgary, AB
Chase Pirtle	Forward	United States	20	Far Hills, NJ
Erick Roest	Goaltender	Canada	20	Lethbridge, AB
Caton Ryan	Forward	United States	19	San Francisco, CA
Xavier Veilleux	Defenseman	Canada	19	L'Ancienne-Lorette, QC; selected 179th overall in 2024

== Roster ==
As of August 6, 2025.

No.	Nat.	Player	Class	Pos	Height	Weight	DoB	Hometown	Previous team	NHL rights
2	(United States)	Hudson Gorski	Freshman	D	6' 3" (1.91 m)	181 lb (82 kg)	2005-09-05	Scotch Plains, New Jersey	Chicago Steel (USHL)	—
3	(Canada)	Jack O'Brien	Senior	D	6' 0" (1.83 m)	170 lb (77 kg)	2003-03-07	White Rock, British Columbia	Nanaimo Clippers (BCHL)	—
4	(Canada)	Xavier Veilleux	Freshman	D	6' 1" (1.85 m)	192 lb (87 kg)	2006-05-23	L'Ancienne-Lorette, Quebec	Muskegon Lumberjacks (USHL)	NYI, 179th overall 2024
5	(Canada)	Hoyt Stanley	Junior	D	6' 3" (1.91 m)	200 lb (91 kg)	2005-02-04	West Vancouver, British Columbia	Victoria Grizzlies (BCHL)	OTT, 108th overall 2023
6	(Canada)	George Fegaras	Junior	D	6' 2" (1.88 m)	205 lb (93 kg)	2004-04-26	Richmond Hill, Ontario	Muskegon Lumberjacks (USHL)	DAL, 83rd overall 2022
7	(Canada)	Luke McCrady	Freshman	D	6' 3" (1.91 m)	185 lb (84 kg)	2005-11-08	Calgary, Alberta	Spruce Grove Saints (BCHL)	—
8	(Canada)	Luke Devlin	Junior	F	6' 3" (1.91 m)	187 lb (85 kg)	2004-03-12	Toronto, Ontario	West Kelowna Warriors (BCHL)	PIT, 182nd overall 2022
9	(United States)	Charlie Major	Sophomore	F	5' 10" (1.78 m)	179 lb (81 kg)	2004-09-14	Skaneateles, New York	Chicago Steel (USHL)	—
10	(United States)	Jacob Kraft	Junior	F	5' 8" (1.73 m)	170 lb (77 kg)	2003-04-26	Churchville, New York	Cedar Rapids RoughRiders (USHL)	—
11	(Canada)	Sean Donaldson	Senior	F	5' 11" (1.8 m)	180 lb (82 kg)	2001-03-28	Vancouver, British Columbia	Nanaimo Clippers (BCHL)	—
12	(United States)	Caton Ryan	Freshman	F	6' 1" (1.85 m)	185 lb (84 kg)	2006-06-25	San Francisco, California	Penticton Vees (BCHL)	—
13	(Slovakia)	Marián Moško	Junior	F	5' 11" (1.8 m)	185 lb (84 kg)	2004-05-11	Visolaje, Slovakia	Fargo Force (USHL)	—
14	(United States)	Ryan Walsh	Junior	F	6' 1" (1.85 m)	180 lb (82 kg)	2003-08-25	Rochester, New York	Cedar Rapids RoughRiders (USHL)	BOS, 188th overall 2023
15	(United States)	Tyler Catalano	Junior	F	6' 4" (1.93 m)	225 lb (102 kg)	2004-02-26	St. Louis, Missouri	Youngstown Phantoms (USHL)	—
16	(United States)	Michael Fisher	Sophomore	F	6' 2" (1.88 m)	194 lb (88 kg)	2004-05-02	Westborough, Massachusetts	Penticton Vees (BCHL)	SJS, 76th overall 2022
17	(Canada)	Aiden Long	Freshman	F	6' 2" (1.88 m)	209 lb (95 kg)	2005-03-13	Mono, Ontario	Madison Capitols (USHL)	—
18	(United States)	Gio DiGiulian	Freshman	F	6' 1" (1.85 m)	161 lb (73 kg)	2005-09-25	South Burlington, Vermont	Tri-City Storm (USHL)	—
19	(Canada)	Connor Arseneault	Freshman	F	6' 2" (1.88 m)	212 lb (96 kg)	2006-03-01	Saint John, New Brunswick	Chilliwack Chiefs (BCHL)	—
21	(Canada)	Reegan Hiscock	Freshman	F	6' 5" (1.96 m)	209 lb (95 kg)	2004-07-02	St. John's, Newfoundland	Victoria Grizzlies (BCHL)	—
22	(United States)	Chase Pirtle	Freshman	F	6' 2" (1.88 m)	176 lb (80 kg)	2005-03-08	Far Hills, New Jersey	Victoria Grizzlies (BCHL)	—
23	(United States)	Winter Wallace	Senior	F	6' 3" (1.91 m)	215 lb (98 kg)	2002-01-21	Boulder, Colorado	Youngstown Phantoms (USHL)	—
24	(Canada)	Nicholas Wolfenberg	Sophomore	D	6' 2" (1.88 m)	201 lb (91 kg)	2004-06-11	Calgary, Alberta	Okotoks Oilers (BCHL)	—
26	(United States)	Donovan Hamilton	Freshman	D	6' 3" (1.91 m)	198 lb (90 kg)	2006-12-03	Buffalo, New York	Salmon Arm Silverbacks (BCHL)	—
27	(Canada)	Luke Ashton	Sophomore	D	6' 7" (2.01 m)	231 lb (105 kg)	2005-01-21	North Vancouver, British Columbia	Minnesota State University (CCHA)	CBJ, 165th overall 2024
28	(United States)	Nick DeSantis	Senior	F	5' 9" (1.75 m)	155 lb (70 kg)	2002-05-02	Collegeville, Pennsylvania	Madison Capitols (USHL)	—
29	(United States)	Parker Murray	Sophomore	F	6' 4" (1.93 m)	225 lb (102 kg)	2003-09-26	Manhattan Beach, California	Chilliwack Chiefs (BCHL)	—
30	(Canada)	Alexis Cournoyer	Freshman	G	6' 4" (1.93 m)	205 lb (93 kg)	2005-12-13	Trois-Rivières, Quebec	Cape Breton Eagles (QMJHL)	MTL, 145th overall 2025
33	(United States)	Remington Keopple	Senior	G	6' 2" (1.88 m)	190 lb (86 kg)	2002-03-21	New Richmond, Wisconsin	Des Moines Buccaneers (USHL)	—
37	(Canada)	Justin Katz	Sophomore	G	6' 2" (1.88 m)	183 lb (83 kg)	2004-10-28	Mont-Royal, Quebec	Powell River Kings (BCHL)	—
38	(Canada)	Jonathan Castagna	Junior	F	6' 2" (1.88 m)	185 lb (84 kg)	2005-04-20	Etobicoke, Ontario	St. Andrew's College (CISAA)	UTA, 70th overall 2023
40	(Canada)	Erick Roest	Freshman	G	6' 0" (1.83 m)	181 lb (82 kg)	2004-10-26	Lethbridge, Alberta	Cowichan Valley Capitals (BCHL)	—

== Standings ==
2025–26 ECAC Hockey Standings
	Conference record										Overall record					
	GP	W	L	T	OTW	OTL	SW	PTS	GF	GA	GP	W	L	T	GF	GA
#8 Quinnipiac †	22	17	4	1	2	0	0	50	102	48	40	27	10	3	162	95
#10 Dartmouth *	22	13	5	4	0	1	3	47	81	53	35	23	8	4	125	75
#12 Cornell	22	15	6	1	1	1	1	47	71	42	34	22	11	1	109	69
Princeton	22	11	9	2	0	1	1	37	63	57	34	18	13	3	103	90
Union	22	11	9	2	1	1	1	36	71	68	37	22	12	3	140	98
Harvard	22	11	10	1	0	1	0	35	61	64	34	16	16	2	92	100
Colgate	22	9	10	3	2	0	2	30	68	74	37	13	20	4	99	125
Clarkson	22	9	10	3	2	0	1	29	65	65	38	18	17	3	111	111
Rensselaer	22	8	13	1	0	1	0	26	55	70	35	11	23	1	80	115
Yale	22	7	14	1	2	2	0	22	63	80	31	8	22	1	79	115
St. Lawrence	22	6	15	1	0	0	1	20	59	99	35	7	25	3	85	151
Brown	22	4	16	2	0	2	1	17	44	83	31	5	24	2	63	119
Championship: March 21, 2026 † indicates conference regular season champion (Cleary Cup) * indicates conference tournament champion (Whitelaw Cup); Rankings: USCHO.com Top 20 Poll; updated April 15, 2026

== Schedule and results ==
Date	Time	Opponent^{#}	Rank^{#}	Site	TV	Decision	Result	Attendance	Record
Exhibition
October 17	8:00 pm	Univerzitní Hokej*	#18	Lynah Rink • Ithaca, New York (Exhibition)	ESPN+	Keopple	W 7–2	1,346	
October 25	7:00 pm	USNTDP*	#19	Lynah Rink • Ithaca, New York (Exhibition)	ESPN+	Keopple	W 5–4	1,839	
Regular season
October 31	7:00 pm	at #13 Massachusetts*	#20	Mullins Center • Amherst, Massachusetts	ESPN+	Keopple	L 1–2	3,081	0–1–0
November 1	7:00 pm	at #13 Massachusetts*	#20	Mullins Center • Amherst, Massachusetts	ESPN+	Cournoyer	W 3–1	3,619	1–1–0
November 7	7:00 pm	at Harvard	#17	Bright-Landry Hockey Center • Boston, Massachusetts (Rivalry)	ESPN+	Cournoyer	W 3–1	3,095	2–1–0 (1–0–0)
November 8	7:00 pm	at Dartmouth	#17	Thompson Arena • Hanover, New Hampshire	ESPN+	Cournoyer	L 1–2	2,523	2–2–0 (1–1–0)
November 14	7:00 pm	Brown	#20	Lynah Rink • Ithaca, New York	ESPN+	Cournoyer	W 4–1	4,267	3–2–0 (2–1–0)
November 15	7:00 pm	Yale	#20	Lynah Rink • Ithaca, New York	ESPN+	Cournoyer	W 5–2	4,267	4–2–0 (3–1–0)
November 21	7:00 pm	#20 Union	#19	Lynah Rink • Ithaca, New York	ESPN+	Cournoyer	W 2–1	3,230	5–2–0 (4–1–0)
November 22	7:00 pm	Rensselaer	#19	Lynah Rink • Ithaca, New York	ESPN+	Cournoyer	W 6–1	3,760	6–2–0 (5–1–0)
November 29	8:00 pm	vs. #19 Boston University*	#17	Madison Square Garden • Manhattan, New York (Red Hot Hockey)	ESPN+	Cournoyer	L 1–2	17,478	6–3–0
December 5	7:00 pm	at Clarkson	#17	Cheel Arena • Potsdam, New York	ESPN+, SNY	Cournoyer	L 1–3	2,285	6–4–0 (5–2–0)
December 6	7:00 pm	at St. Lawrence	#17	Appleton Arena • Canton, New York	ESPN+	Keopple	W 7–2	734	7–4–0 (6–2–0)
January 2	7:00 pm	Omaha*	#17	Lynah Rink • Ithaca, New York	ESPN+	Cournoyer	W 6–4	1,982	8–4–0
January 3	7:00 pm	Omaha*	#17	Lynah Rink • Ithaca, New York	ESPN+	Keopple	W 3–2	1,982	9–4–0
January 9	7:00 pm	Alaska*	#14	Lynah Rink • Ithaca, New York	ESPN+	Cournoyer	W 7–1	2,108	10–4–0
January 10	7:00 pm	Alaska*	#14	Lynah Rink • Ithaca, New York	ESPN+	Keopple	W 5–2	2,874	11–4–0
January 16	7:00 pm	#18 Princeton	#13	Lynah Rink • Ithaca, New York	ESPN+	Cournoyer	W 2–1	3,473	12–4–0 (7–2–0)
January 17	7:00 pm	#7 Quinnipiac	#13	Lynah Rink • Ithaca, New York	ESPN+, SNY	Cournoyer	L 1–4	3,643	12–5–0 (7–3–0)
January 23	7:00 pm	#10 Dartmouth	#12	Lynah Rink • Ithaca, New York	ESPN+	Cournoyer	W 2–1 ^{OT}	4,267	13–5–0 (8–3–0)
January 24	7:00 pm	Harvard	#12	Lynah Rink • Ithaca, New York (Rivalry)	ESPN+	Cournoyer	W 4–1	4,267	14–5–0 (9–3–0)
January 30	7:00 pm	at Yale	#10	Ingalls Rink • New Haven, Connecticut	ESPN+	Cournoyer	W 5–2	2,225	15–5–0 (10–3–0)
January 31	5:00 pm	at Brown	#10	Meehan Auditorium • Providence, Rhode Island	ESPN+	Cournoyer	W 4–2	1,422	16–5–0 (11–3–0)
February 6	7:00 pm	at Colgate	#9	Class of 1965 Arena • Hamilton, New York	ESPN+	Cournoyer	W 5–2	2,222	17–5–0 (12–3–0)
February 7	7:00 pm	Colgate	#9	Lynah Rink • Ithaca, New York	ESPN+	Cournoyer	L 2–3 ^{OT}	4,267	17–6–0 (12–4–0)
February 13	7:00 pm	at Rensselaer	#9	Houston Field House • Troy, New York	ESPN+	Keopple	T 1–1 ^{SOW}	2,132	17–6–1 (12–4–1)
February 14	7:00 pm	at Union	#9	M&T Bank Center • Schenectady, New York	ESPN+	Cournoyer	L 1–4	2,345	17–7–1 (12–5–1)
February 20	7:00 pm	at #5 Quinnipiac	#11	M&T Bank Arena • Hamden, Connecticut	ESPN+	Cournoyer	W 6–1	3,274	18–7–1 (13–5–1)
February 21	7:00 pm	at Princeton	#11	Hobey Baker Memorial Rink • Princeton, New Jersey	ESPN+	Cournoyer	L 2–4	2,192	18–8–1 (13–6–1)
February 27	7:00 pm	St. Lawrence	#11	Lynah Rink • Ithaca, New York	ESPN+	Cournoyer	W 5–1	3,762	19–8–1 (14–6–1)
February 28	7:00 pm	Clarkson	#11	Lynah Rink • Ithaca, New York	ESPN+	Keopple	W 2–1	4,267	20–8–1 (15–6–1)
ECAC Hockey Tournament
March 13	7:00 pm	Harvard*	#9	Lynah Rink • Ithaca, New York (ECAC Quarterfinal Game 1, Rivalry)	ESPN+	Cournoyer	L 1–3	4,267	20–9–1
March 14	7:00 pm	Harvard*	#9	Lynah Rink • Ithaca, New York (ECAC Quarterfinal Game 2, Rivalry)	ESPN+	Cournoyer	W 4–0	4,267	21–9–1
March 15	4:00 pm	Harvard*	#9	Lynah Rink • Ithaca, New York (ECAC Quarterfinal Game 3, Rivalry)	ESPN+	Cournoyer	W 5–2	4,267	22–9–1
March 20	7:00 pm	vs. Princeton*	#8	Herb Brooks Arena • Lake Placid, New York (ECAC Semifinal)	ESPN+	Cournoyer	L 2–3	5,164	22–10–1
NCAA Tournament
March 27	6:00 pm	vs. #4 Denver*	#9	Blue Arena • Loveland, Colorado (Regional Semifinal)	ESPN+	Cournoyer	L 0–5	4,217	22–11–1
*Non-conference game. ^{#}Rankings from USCHO.com Poll. All times are in Eastern Time. Source:

== NCAA tournament ==
=== Regional semifinal ===
March 27, 2026; 6:00 pm on ESPN+	(2) Denver	5–0 (2–0, 1–0, 2–0)	(3) Cornell	Blue Arena; Attendance: 4,217

Game reference

Johnny Hicks
Goalies
Alexis Cournoyer
Referees:
Christopher Leavitt
Brendan Blanchard
Linesmen:
Patrick Philbin
Conner Foley

(Ashcroft, Burrows) Jake Fisher (8) – GW – 6:08	1–0
(Jamieson) Kieran Cebrian (5) – 15:33	2–0
(Caswell) Sam Harris (14) – 35:31	3–0
(Ashcroft, Harris) Clarke Caswell (7) – 45:06	4–0
(Reeder) Rieger Lorenz (16) – EN – 16:12	5–0

2 min
Penalties
4 min
30
Shots
24

Game summary

== Scoring statistics ==
Name	Position	Games	Goals	Assists	Points	PIM
Jonathan Castagna	C/LW	34	15	19	34	31
Ryan Walsh	C/RW	33	10	23	33	33
Caton Ryan	LW	34	11	19	30	8
Charlie Major	F	32	10	17	27	2
Xavier Veilleux	D	34	6	20	26	12
George Fegaras	D	34	5	16	21	30
Aiden Long	LW/RW	34	9	11	20	18
Jacob Kraft	C	34	9	9	18	8
Hoyt Stanley	D	34	3	12	15	33
Gio DiGiulian	LW	34	9	5	14	26
Luke Ashton	D	34	3	8	11	6
Reegan Hiscock	LW	34	6	4	10	18
Nick DeSantis	F	33	4	4	8	10
Chase Pirtle	F	27	3	5	8	6
Michael Fisher	D	33	1	7	8	14
Jack O'Brien	D	34	0	6	6	4
Luke Devlin	C	20	3	2	5	8
Tyler Catalano	C/RW	34	2	1	3	10
Connor Arsenault	LW	16	0	2	2	6
Donovan Hamilton	D	3	0	1	1	0
Sean Donaldson	LW	1	0	0	0	0
Luke McCrady	D	1	0	0	0	2
Nicholas Wolfenberg	D	3	0	0	0	0
Parker Murray	F	9	0	0	0	0
Hudson Gorski	D	9	0	0	0	2
Winter Wallace	RW	18	0	0	0	10
Bench	–	–	–	–	–	2
Total			109	191	300	297

== Goaltending statistics ==
Name	Games	Minutes	Wins	Losses	Ties	Goals against	Saves	Shut-outs	SV %	GAA
Remington Keopple	7	388:29	4	1	1	10	140	0	.933	1.54
Alexis Cournoyer	28	1636:17	18	10	0	56	603	1	.915	2.05
Empty Net	-	21:59	-	-	-	3	-	-	-	-
Total	34	2046:45	22	11	1	69	743	1	.915	2.02

== Rankings ==
Poll	Week																											
Poll	Pre	1	2	3	4	5	6	7	8	9	10	11	12	13	14	15	16	17	18	19	20	21	22	23	24	25	26	27 (Final)
USCHO.com	17	17	18	19	20	17	20	19	17	17	17	17	–	17	14	13	12	10	9	9	11	11	9	9	8	9	–	12
USA Hockey	16	16т	18	19	20	16	19	17	16	16	15	16т	–	17	12	12	12	10	8	10	10	10	9	9	8	11	12	12

Note: USCHO did not release a poll in week 12 or 26.
Note: USA Hockey did not release a poll in week 12.
