= Ingalls Rink =

Arena in New Haven, Connecticut

Coordinates: 41.316552°N 72.925039°W

David S. Ingalls Rink
- "The Whale"
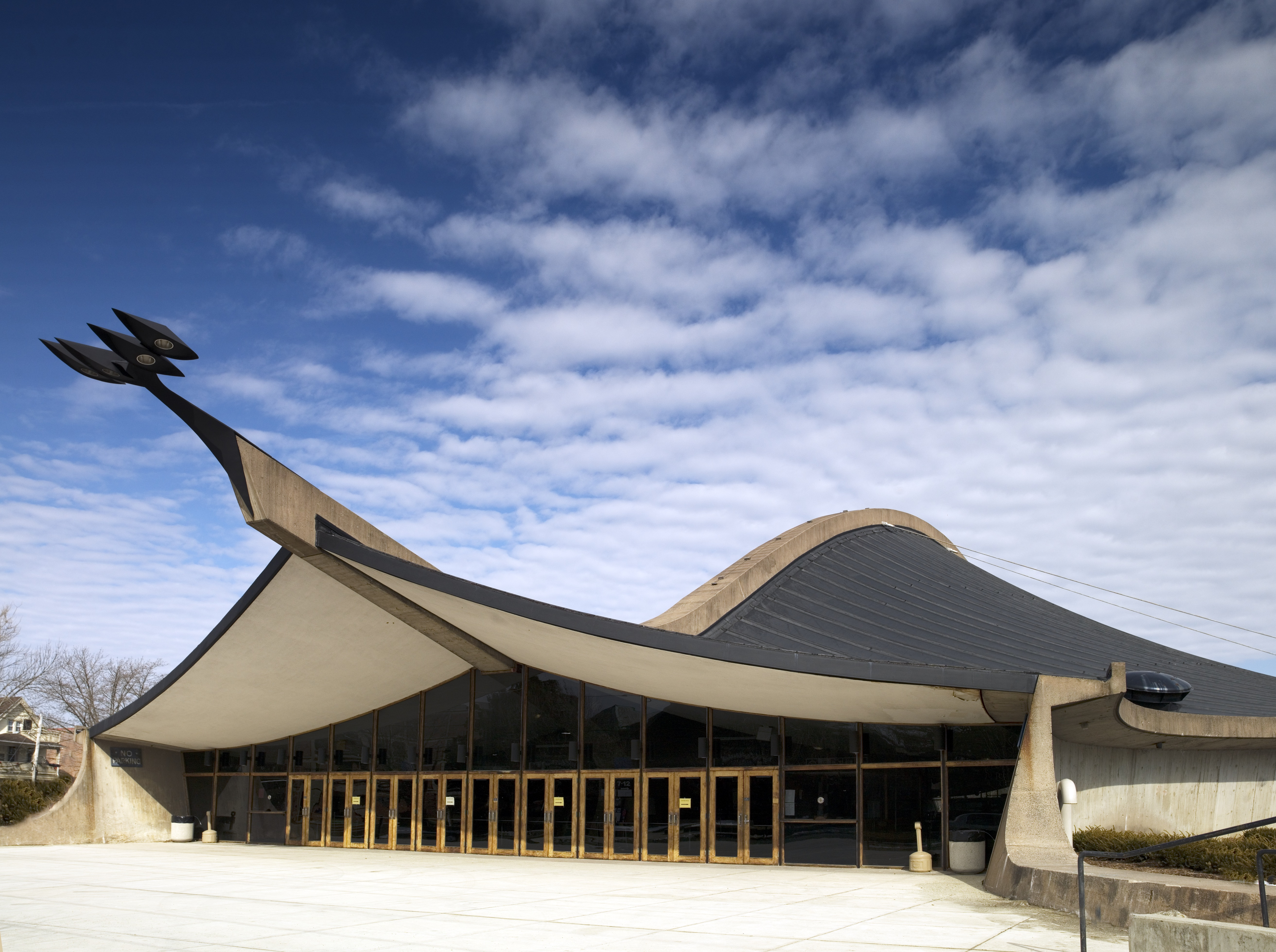
- Interactive map of David S. Ingalls Rink
- Location: 73 Sachem Street; New Haven, Connecticut, US
- Owner: Yale University
- Operator: Yale University
- Capacity: 3,500 (when configured for hockey)
- Surface: 200 x 85 ft (hockey)

Construction
- Groundbreaking: 1953
- Opened: December 3, 1958
- Renovated: 2009
- Cost: $1.5 Million
- Architect: Eero Saarinen
- Structural engineer: Severud Associates

Tenants
- Yale Bulldogs (men's and women's hockey)

David S. Ingalls Rink is a hockey rink in New Haven, Connecticut, designed by architect Eero Saarinen and built between 1953 and 1958 for Yale University. It is commonly referred to as The Whale, due to its shape. The building was constructed for $1.5 million, which was double its original cost estimate. It seats 3,500 people and has a maximum ceiling height of 75 feet (23 m). The building is named for David S. Ingalls, Yale class of 1920, and David S. Ingalls, Jr., Yale class of 1956, both of whom were hockey captains. Members of the Ingalls family were the primary benefactors of the arena. The building was included on the America's Favorite Architecture list, created in 2007 by the American Institute of Architects.

== Structural system ==
The rink employs an innovative structural system employing a 300-foot (90 m) reinforced concrete arch, a catenary arch form for which Saarinen's projects became known. A cable net is strung from the arch, supporting a timber roof. This causes a stable, double curvature form. Exterior cables linking the arch directly to the outer edges of the roof were added during structural design development. These cables address forces caused by asymmetrical wind loads. Fred N. Severud was the structural engineer for the project.

== Bombing ==
On May 1, 1970, several rock bands were playing a concert in Ingalls Rink as part of the protests on New Haven Green against the Black Panther trials. Shortly before midnight and towards the end of the concert, two bombs exploded in the north end of the rink's basement. The explosions caused no injuries, but shattered the building's glass doors and caused cracks to form in its arch. No culprit was ever identified, and both Yale President Kingman Brewster and New Haven Police Chief James Ahern contended that either pro- or anti-Panther partisans could have planted the devices.

== Renovations ==
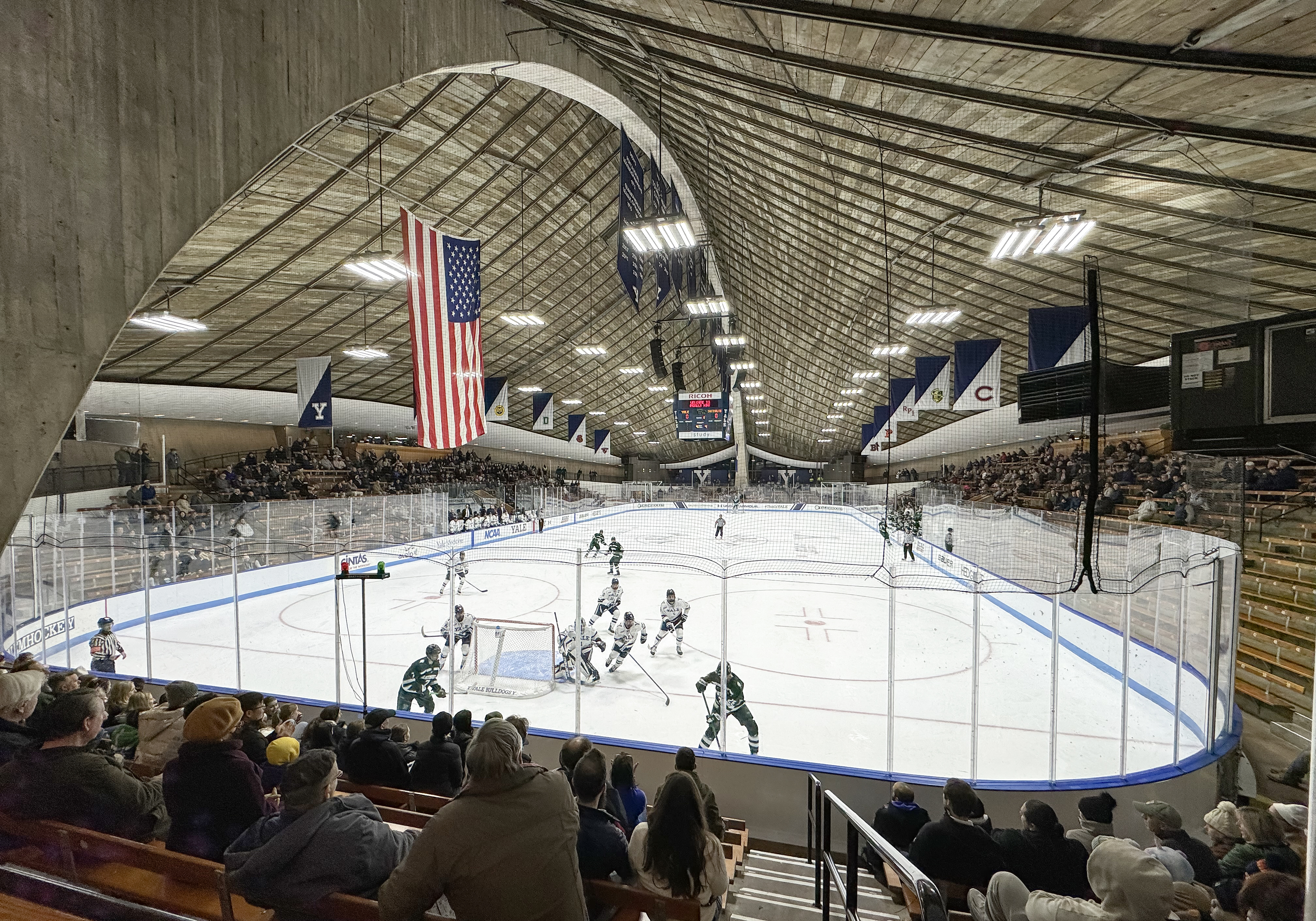
Rink interior with timbered roof

The building has been renovated by Kevin Roche and Roche-Dinkeloo, the firm which is a direct outgrowth of Eero Saarinen and Associates. In 1991, a new concrete refrigerant slab was added at a cost of $1.5 million.

In 2007, it was announced that the rink would undergo a $23.5 million renovation which would include approximately 13,000 square feet (1,200 m^{2}) of varsity operational space as well as a complete renovation of the facility, including new men's and women's varsity locker rooms, training and strength and conditioning rooms, an added press box, a lower level hockey heritage area, offices for coaches of both programs, a student-athlete study area, new lights, as well as a sound system and de-humidification unit. The lower level interior would also be decorated with photos displaying the history of Yale hockey. These renovations were completed in 2009.

In August 2025, the university announced $3 million worth of upgrades for the arena. The primary focus would be a new videoboard suspended over the ice.

== See also ==
- Yale Bulldogs men's ice hockey
- Yale Bulldogs women's ice hockey
- Tensile architecture
- Tensile and membrane structures
- Thin-shell structure
- List of thin shell structures
- Salle Frédéric-Lawson-Body, a sports arena in Poitiers, France, whose design was inspired by Ingalls Rink
