= Class of 1965 Arena =

Colgate University sports arena

Coordinates: 42.8155986°N 75.5424857°W

- Interactive map of Class of 1965 Arena
- Address: Hamilton, NY; United States
- Owner: Colgate University
- Operator: Colgate University Athletics
- Capacity: 2,222 (hockey)
- Type: Arena
- Surface: 200 x 85 ft (hockey)
- Current use: Ice hockey

Construction
- Opened: 2016; 10 years ago
- Cost: $37.8 million

Tenants
- Colgate Raiders teams: men's and women's ice hockey

Website
- colgateathletics.com/class-of-1965-arena

Class of 1965 Arena is a 2,222-seat multi-purpose arena in Hamilton, New York. It opened to the Colgate University Raiders men's and women's ice hockey teams on October 1, 2016, replacing Starr Arena which had been in service since 1959. The ice rink is named the Steven J. Riggs '65 Rink, in honor of Steven Riggs, one of Colgate's best hockey players in the program's history, who was killed in action on September 3, 1968, in Quy Thien, Vietnam. The facility was built partly with the aid of 559 donors, a significant number of whom represented the Colgate Class of 1965. The facility cost $37.8 million.
