= 2026 Hockey East men's tournament =

2026 Hockey East men's ice hockey tournament
- Dates: March 11–21, 2026
- Teams: 11
- Finals site: TD Garden; Boston, Massachusetts
- Champions: Merrimack (1st title)
- Winning coach: Scott Borek (1st title)
- MVP: Max Lundgren (Merrimack)
- Hockey East men's Ice Hockey Tournaments

The 2026 Hockey East men's ice hockey tournament was the 41st tournament in the history of the conference. It was played between March 11 and March 21, 2026. The Merrimack Warriors won their first ever Hockey East championship after beating UMass Lowell, Providence College and UMass. The championship game was played between Merrimack and Connecticut, with Merrimack winning 2-1 and becoming the first 8 seed to ever win the Hockey East tournament.

Merrimack goalie Max Ludgren was named tournament MVP after having a shutout in the semifinals vs. UMass and making 49 saves on 50 shots in the championship game.

== Format ==
The tournament includes all eleven teams in the conference, with teams ranked according to their finish in the conference standings. Seeds 1–5 earn a bye into the quarterfinal round, while seeds 6–11 play to determine the remaining quarterfinalists. Winners in the opening round are reseeded and advanced to play top three seeds in reverse order. Winners of the quarterfinal matches are again reseeded for the semifinal, and the winners of those two games face off in the championship.

All series are single-elimination with opening round and quarterfinal matches occurring at home team sites. The two semifinal games and championship match are held at the TD Garden. The tournament champion receives an automatic bid into the NCAA Division I men's ice hockey tournament.

== Standings ==
2025–26 Hockey East Standings
	Conference record										Overall record					
	GP	W	L	T	OTW	OTL	SW	PTS	GF	GA	GP	W	L	T	GF	GA
#9 Providence †	24	18	5	1	2	1	0	54	86	46	36	23	11	2	120	82
#16 Massachusetts	24	14	9	1	2	1	1	43	63	53	36	22	13	1	101	83
#13 Connecticut	24	12	9	3	1	1	2	41	73	59	38	20	13	5	116	90
#19 Boston College	24	13	11	0	1	1	2	39	69	59	36	20	15	1	116	92
Maine	24	12	11	1	3	2	0	36	76	79	35	18	14	3	116	96
Boston University	24	12	12	0	3	2	0	35	69	74	36	17	17	2	105	110
Northeastern	24	11	13	0	1	3	0	35	67	62	36	17	18	1	98	91
#15 Merrimack *	24	10	12	2	0	1	1	34	68	75	39	21	16	2	121	110
Massachusetts Lowell	24	9	15	0	1	2	0	28	66	80	35	13	22	0	91	114
New Hampshire	24	8	15	1	0	0	1	26	41	73	35	14	20	1	68	105
Vermont	24	8	15	1	0	0	0	25	55	83	35	13	21	1	73	115
Championship: March 21, 2026 † indicates regular season champion * indicates conference tournament champion (Lamoriello Trophy); Rankings: USCHO Division I Men's Poll; updated April 15, 2026

== Bracket ==
Note: Teams are reseeded after the Opening Round and Quarterfinals

Opening Round; March 11
11	Vermont	1
6	Boston University	4
10	New Hampshire	3
7	Northeastern	7
9	Massachusetts Lowell	3
8	Merrimack	5

Quarterfinals; March 13–14
5	Maine	0
4	Boston College	5
6	Boston University	3
3	Connecticut	5
7	Northeastern	1
2	Massachusetts	4
8	Merrimack	3*
1	Providence	2

Semifinals; March 20
3	Connecticut	4*
4	Boston College	3
2	Massachusetts	0
8	Merrimack	2

Championship; March 21
3	Connecticut	1
8	Merrimack	2

Note: * denotes overtime period(s)

== Results ==
Note: All game times are local.

=== Opening Round: March 11, 2026 ===
==== (11) Vermont vs. (6) Boston University ====
Boston, MA - Agganis Arena - 6:30 PM - Attendance: 1,931

Scoring summary
Period	Team	Goal	Assist(s)	Time	Score
1st	BU	Cole Eiserman - PPG	Hutson, McCarthy	17:16	1–0 BU
2nd	UVM	Jens Richards	Aegerter, Michels	22:51	1–1
3rd	BU	Cole Eiserman - GWG	Lawrence	46:51	2–1 BU
3rd	BU	Cole Hutson - PPG	McCarthy, Eiserman	52:36	3–1 BU
3rd	BU	Jack Harvey - ENG	Bednarik	57:15	4–1 BU

Goaltenders
Team	Name	Saves	Goals against	Time on ice
UVM	Aiden Wright	24	3	55:47
BU	Mikhail Yegorov	25	1	60:00

==== (10) New Hampshire vs. (7) Northeastern ====
Chestnut Hill, MA - Conte Forum - 7:00 PM - Attendance: 452

Scoring summary
Period	Team	Goal	Assist(s)	Time	Score
1st	NU	Jacob Mathieu	Compton, Hajibi	2:10	1–0 NU
2nd	UNH	Alex Carr - SHG	Skrastins, Lavins	22:00	1–1
2nd	NU	Tyler Fukakusa	Hryckowian, Martino	27:41	2–1 NU
2nd	NU	Amine Hajibi	Perkins, Connor	30:06	3–1 NU
2nd	UNH	Cam McDonald	Skrastins, Fitzgerald	32:09	3–2 NU
2nd	NU	Joe Connor - PPG GWG	Mathieu, Pechar	37:04	4–2 NU
2nd	NU	Dylan Compton	Mathieu, Hajibi	39:29	5–2 NU
3rd	UNH	Nick Ring - PPG	McDonald, LeClerc	44:36	5–3 NU
3rd	NU	Matthew Perkins - SHG ENG	Unassisted	56:51	6–3 NU
3rd	NU	Noah Jones - ENG	Unassisted	57:39	7–3 NU

Goaltenders
Team	Name	Saves	Goals against	Time on ice
UNH	Kyle Chauvette	17	5	58:55
NU	Lawton Zacher	24	3	60:00

==== (9) Massachusetts Lowell vs. (8) Merrimack ====
North Andover, MA - Lawler Rink - 7:00 PM - Attendance: 1,992

Scoring summary
Period	Team	Goal	Assist(s)	Time	Score
1st	MC	Trevor Hoskin	Pierre, Gill	1:12	1–0 MC
1st	UML	Jack Collins	Delaney, Misskey	17:33	1–1
1st	MC	Nolan Flamand	Oravetz	18:51	2–1 MC
2nd	MC	Nick Pierre - PPG	Powell	26:51	3–1 MC
2nd	MC	Trevor Hoskin - GWG	Pierre, Gill	35:30	4–1 MC
3rd	UML	Dillan Bentley	Misskey	53:43	4–2 MC
3rd	UML	Dominic Payne	Delaney, Adaszynski	56:43	4–3 MC
3rd	MC	Parker Lalonde - ENG	Fitzpatrick, Cranston	58:57	5–3 MC

Goaltenders
Team	Name	Saves	Goals against	Time on ice
UML	Samuel Richard	25	4	58:31
MC	Max Lundgren	23	3	59:47

=== Quarterfinals: March 13–14, 2026 ===
==== (5) Maine vs (4) Boston College ====
Chestnut Hill, MA - Conte Forum - 7:00 PM - Attendance: 5,695

Scoring summary
Period	Team	Goal	Assist(s)	Time	Score
1st	BC	Teddy Stiga – GWG	Radivojevic, Fortescue	4:49	1–0 BC
1st	BC	James Hagens	Gustafsson	5:28	2–0 BC
2nd	None				
3rd	BC	Oskar Jellvik	Conmy	41:34	3–0 BC
3rd	BC	Dean Letourneau – ENG	Hagens	55:25	4–0 BC
3rd	BC	James Hagens – ENG	Letourneau, Kostadinski	4:49	5–0 BC

Goaltenders
Team	Name	Saves	Goals against	Time on ice
MAINE	Mathis Rousseau	21	3	59:28
BC	Louka Cloutier	18	0	60:00

==== (6) Boston University vs (3) Connecticut ====
Storrs, CT - Toscano Family Ice Forum - 1:00 PM - Attendance: 2,513

Scoring summary
Period	Team	Goal	Assist(s)	Time	Score
1st	CONN	Jake Percival	Fraser, Heaslip	6:44	1–0 CONN
2nd	BU	Tynan Lawrence	Unassisted	21:11	1–1
2nd	CONN	Jake Richard – PPG	Muldowney, Janviriya	23:33	2–1 CONN
2nd	BU	Jack Murtagh	Lawrence, Ritchie	32:35	2–2
3rd	CONN	Ethan Whitcomb	Murtagh	42:39	3–2 CONN
3rd	CONN	Anthony Allain Samake – GWG	Percival, Gustafsson Nyberg	43:47	4–2 CONN
3rd	BU	Ben Merrill	Unassisted	49:54	4–3 CONN
3rd	CONN	Joey Muldowney – ENG	Tattle	59:05	5–3 CONN

Goaltenders
Team	Name	Saves	Goals against	Time on ice
BU	Mikhail Yegorov	33	4	58:31
CONN	Tyler Muszelik	29	3	60:00

==== (7) Northeastern University vs (2) Massachusetts ====
Amherst, MA - Mullins Center - 4:00 PM - Attendance: 4,537

Scoring summary
Period	Team	Goal	Assist(s)	Time	Score
1st	MASS	Larry Keenan	Musa, Nestrašil	3:37	1–0 MASS
1st	NU	Griffin Erdman	Connor, May	18:39	1–1
2nd	MASS	Jack Musa – GWG	Nestrašil, Galanek	39:36	2–1 MASS
3rd	MASS	Václav Nestrašil	Musa, Galanek	44:08	3–1 MASS
3rd	MASS	Cam O'Neill – ENG	Klečka, Kerr	59:32	4–1 MASS

Goaltenders
Team	Name	Saves	Goals against	Time on ice
NU	Lawton Zacher	23	3	57:51
MASS	Michael Hrabel	30	1	59:55

==== (8) Merrimack vs. (1) Providence ====
Providence, RI - Schneider Arena - 7:00 PM - Attendance: 2,798

Scoring summary
Period	Team	Goal	Assist(s)	Time	Score
1st	PC	Graham Gamache	Mustard	13:49	1–0 PC
1st	MC	Nathan King – PPG	Lalonde, Beyer	18:45	1–1
2nd	None				
3rd	MC	Nolan Flamand – PPG	Fitzpatrick, King	40:49	2–1 MC
3rd	PC	John Mustard	Mantei, McQueen	56:44	2–2
OT	MC	Trevor Hoskin – GWG	Gill, Beyer	63:50	3–2 MC

Goaltenders
Team	Name	Saves	Goals against	Time on ice
MC	Max Lundgren	34	2	63:49
PC	Jack Parsons	27	3	63:46

=== Semifinals: March 20, 2026 ===
==== (3) Connecticut vs (4) Boston College ====
Boston, MA - TD Garden - 7:00 PM - Attendance: 15,573

Scoring summary
Period	Team	Goal	Assist(s)	Time	Score
1st	None				
2nd	BC	Dean Letourneau – PPG	Gasseau, Hagens	20:39	1–0 BC
2nd	CONN	Trey Scott	Muldowney, Tattle	21:32	1–1
2nd	BC	Dean Letourneau – PPG	Hagens, Gustafsson	25:09	2–1 BC
2nd	CONN	Ethan Whitcomb	Murtagh, Gardula	28:28	2–2
3rd	CONN	Mike Murtagh	Whitcomb, Gustafsson Nyberg	52:28	3–2 CONN
3rd	BC	Ryan Conmy	Stiga, Fortescue	54:13	3–3
OT	CONN	Tristan Fraser – GWG	Heaslip, Percival	61:18	4–3 CONN

Goaltenders
Team	Name	Saves	Goals against	Time on ice
CONN	Tyler Muszelik	22	3	61:17
BC	Louka Cloutier	28	4	61:15

==== (2) Massachusetts vs (8) Merrimack ====
Boston, MA - TD Garden - 4:00 PM - Attendance:

Scoring summary
Period	Team	Goal	Assist(s)	Time	Score
1st	None				
2nd	None				
3rd	MC	Ryan O'Connell – GWG	Daneault	43:00	1–0 MC
3rd	MC	Caden Cranston – ENG	Lalonde, Oravetz	58:21	2–0 MC

Goaltenders
Team	Name	Saves	Goals against	Time on ice
MASS	Michael Hrabal	27	1	58:01
MC	Max Lundgren	24	0	60:00

=== Championship: March 21, 2026 ===
==== (3) Connecticut vs (8) Merrimack ====
Boston, MA - TD Garden - 7:00 PM - Attendance: 15,759

Scoring summary
Period	Team	Goal	Assist(s)	Time	Score
1st	None				
2nd	MC	Ryan O'Connell	Hoskin, Kungle	22:29	1–0 MC
2nd	CONN	Ethan Whitcomb	Allain Samake	37:22	1–1
3rd	MC	Caelan Fitzpatrick – GWG	Lalonde	40:26	2–1 MC

Goaltenders
Team	Name	Saves	Goals against	Time on ice
CONN	Tyler Muszelik	23	2	58:25
MC	Max Lundgren	49	1	60:00

== Tournament Awards ==
=== All-Tournament Team ===
- G – Max Lundgren* (Merrimack)
- D – Nathan King (Merrimack)
- D – Tom Messineo (Connecticut)
- F – Dean Letourneau (Boston College)
- F – Ryan O'Connell (Merrimack)
- F – Trevor Hoskin (Merrimack)

* Tournament MVP
