= 2025–26 Vermont Catamounts men's ice hockey season =

- Conference: Hockey East
- Home ice: Gutterson Fieldhouse

Record
- Overall: 12–20–1
- Conference: 7–15–1
- Home: 6–11–0
- Road: 6–9–1

Coaches and captains
- Head coach: Steve Wiedler
- Assistant coaches: Scott Moser; Brendan Bradley; Nate Skidmore
- Captain(s): Jens Richards; Philip Törnqvist

The 2025–26 Vermont Catamounts men's ice hockey season will be the 70th season of play for the program, the 53rd at the Division I level and the 21st in Hockey East. The Catamounts will represent the University of Vermont in the 2025–26 NCAA Division I men's ice hockey season, play their home games at the Gutterson Fieldhouse and be coached by Steve Wiedler in his 3rd season.

== Departures ==
Player	Position	Nationality	Cause
Nick Ahern	Forward	United States	Transferred to Utica
Eli Barnett	Defenseman	Canada	Transferred to New Brunswick
Matt Cato	Forward	Canada	Left program (retired)
Mateo Dixon	Forward	Canada	Transferred to Queen's
Mario Gasparini	Defenseman	United States	Left program (retired)
Simon Jellúš	Forward	Canada	Graduation (signed with HC Košice)
Connor Mackenzie	Goaltender	Canada	Transferred to Holy Cross
Joel Määttä	Forward	Finland	Graduation (signed with HC TPS)
Luca Münzenberger	Defenseman	Germany	Graduation (signed with Kölner Haie)
Keenan Rancier	Goaltender	Canada	Graduation (retired)
Timofei Spitserov	Forward	Russia	Graduation (signed with Norfolk Admirals)
Isak Walther	Forward	Sweden	Graduation (signed with Atlanta Gladiators)
William Zapernick	Forward	Canada	Graduation (signed with Wichita Thunder)

== Recruiting ==
Player	Position	Nationality	Age	Notes
Jonah Aegerter	Forward	United States	21	Janesville, WI
Cameron Brown	Goaltender	United States	23	Marblehead, MA; joined team midseason
Ethan Burroughs	Forward	Canada	22	Oakville, ON; transfer from St. Francis Xavier
Tyler Dysart	Forward	United States	21	Sunnyvale, CA
Zach Filak	Forward	United States	21	Northville, MI
P. J. Forgione	Defenseman	United States	20	Burlington, VT
Dylan Gratton	Defenseman	United States	22	Pottstown, PA; transfer from Omaha
Cédrick Guindon	Forward	Canada	21	Rockland, ON; selected 127th overall in 2022
Caeden Herrington	Defenseman	United States	19	Manchester, VT; selected 120th overall in 2025
Jacob Oster	Goaltender	Canada	21	Manotick, ON
David Sacco	Forward	United States	23	Middleton, MA; transfer from Merrimack
Aiden Wright	Goaltender	United States	19	Wake Forest, NC

== Roster ==
As of November 23, 2025.

No.	Nat.	Player	Class	Pos	Height	Weight	DoB	Hometown	Previous team	NHL rights
2	(United States)	Caeden Herrington	Freshman	D	6' 2" (1.88 m)	205 lb (93 kg)	2006-01-26	Manchester, Vermont	Lincoln Stars (USHL)	LAK, 120th overall 2025
4	(Sweden)	Philip Törnqvist (C)	Senior	D	6' 0" (1.83 m)	181 lb (82 kg)	2001-08-24	Gothenburg, Sweden	Wichita Falls Warriors (NAHL)	—
5	(United States)	P. J. Forgione	Freshman	D	6' 2" (1.88 m)	214 lb (97 kg)	2004-11-12	Burlington, Vermont	Saginaw Spirit (OHL)	—
6	(United States)	Charlie Kinsman	Sophomore	D	5' 11" (1.8 m)	190 lb (86 kg)	2005-03-17	Orchard Park, New York	Tri-City Storm (USHL)	—
7	(Canada)	Jax Wismer	Sophomore	D	6' 0" (1.83 m)	176 lb (80 kg)	2005-03-03	Newmarket, Ontario	Alberni Valley Bulldogs (BCHL)	—
9	(Canada)	Michael La Starza	Sophomore	F	5' 11" (1.8 m)	190 lb (86 kg)	2004-01-14	Montreal, Quebec	Fargo Force (USHL)	—
10	(United States)	Max Strand	Sophomore	F	5' 10" (1.78 m)	190 lb (86 kg)	2003-09-03	Roseau, Minnesota	Sioux City Musketeers (USHL)	—
11	(United States)	Zach Filak	Freshman	F	6' 1" (1.85 m)	185 lb (84 kg)	2004-01-21	Northville, Michigan	Sarnia Sting (OHL)	—
12	(United States)	Jonah Aegerter	Freshman	F	5' 9" (1.75 m)	183 lb (83 kg)	2004-01-21	Janesville, Wisconsin	Fargo Force (USHL)	—
13	(United States)	Blake Steenerson	Sophomore	F	6' 4" (1.93 m)	194 lb (88 kg)	2005-04-29	Maple Grove, Minnesota	Tri-City Storm (USHL)	—
14	(Canada)	Dawson Good	Junior	F	6' 1" (1.85 m)	205 lb (93 kg)	2002-04-17	Abbotsford, British Columbia	Chilliwack Chiefs (BCHL)	—
16	(United States)	Tyler Dysart	Freshman	F	5' 10" (1.78 m)	170 lb (77 kg)	2004-06-30	Sunnyvale, California	Sioux City Musketeers (USHL)	—
17	(United States)	Colin Kessler	Sophomore	F	6' 1" (1.85 m)	181 lb (82 kg)	2004-06-07	Anchorage, Alaska	Sioux City Musketeers (USHL)	—
18	(Canada)	Massimo Lombardi	Senior	F	5' 10" (1.78 m)	195 lb (88 kg)	2002-05-18	Beaconsfield, Quebec	Cowichan Valley Capitals (BCHL)	—
19	(Canada)	Cédrick Guindon	Freshman	F	5' 10" (1.78 m)	181 lb (82 kg)	2004-04-21	Rockland, Ontario	Kingston Frontenacs (OHL)	MTL, 127th overall 2022
20	(Canada)	Xavier Henry	Senior	D	6' 5" (1.96 m)	216 lb (98 kg)	2001-03-20	Scarborough, Ontario	Chilliwack Chiefs (BCHL)	—
21	(United States)	Daniel Sambuco	Junior	F	6' 0" (1.83 m)	190 lb (86 kg)	2003-06-10	Springfield, Pennsylvania	Lincoln Stars (USHL)	—
22	(Canada)	Ethan Burroughs	Sophomore	F	5' 10" (1.78 m)	183 lb (83 kg)	2003-06-19	Oakville, Ontario	St. Francis Xavier (AUS)	—
23	(United States)	Dylan Gratton	Senior	D	6' 0" (1.83 m)	180 lb (82 kg)	2003-02-25	Pottstown, Pennsylvania	Omaha (NCHC)	—
25	(United States)	Jack Malinski	Junior	D	5' 10" (1.78 m)	170 lb (77 kg)	2002-06-23	Lakeville, Minnesota	Austin Bruins (NAHL)	—
26	(Canada)	Thomas Sinclair	Senior	F	6' 3" (1.91 m)	194 lb (88 kg)	2002-12-26	Toronto, Ontario	Fargo Force (USHL)	—
27	(Canada)	Duncan Ramsay	Junior	D	6' 5" (1.96 m)	205 lb (93 kg)	2004-02-08	Halifax, Nova Scotia	Chilliwack Chiefs (BCHL)	—
29	(United States)	Jens Richards (C)	Senior	F	6' 2" (1.88 m)	194 lb (88 kg)	2002-12-14	Detroit Lakes, Minnesota	Austin Bruins (NAHL)	—
30	(United States)	Cameron Brown	Graduate	G	6' 0" (1.83 m)	181 lb (82 kg)	2002-09-05	Marblehead, Massachusetts	Pingree (USHS)	—
34	(United States)	Aiden Wright	Freshman	G	6' 1" (1.85 m)	190 lb (86 kg)	2005-10-26	Wake Forest, North Carolina	Sioux Falls Stampede (USHL)	—
37	(United States)	David Sacco	Sophomore	F	6' 1" (1.85 m)	194 lb (88 kg)	2002-01-03	Middleton, Massachusetts	Merrimack (HEA)	—
38	(Sweden)	Sebastian Törnqvist	Junior	D	5' 11" (1.8 m)	187 lb (85 kg)	2003-05-22	Everlöv, Sweden	Massachusetts (HEA)	—
39	(Canada)	Jacob Oster	Freshman	G	6' 3" (1.91 m)	194 lb (88 kg)	2004-03-26	Manotick, Ontario	Oshawa Generals (OHL)	—
50	(Sweden)	Axel Mangbo	Junior	G	6' 3" (1.91 m)	181 lb (82 kg)	2003-04-15	Höganäs, Sweden	Sioux City Musketeers (USHL)	—

== Standings ==
2025–26 Hockey East Standings
	Conference record										Overall record					
	GP	W	L	T	OTW	OTL	SW	PTS	GF	GA	GP	W	L	T	GF	GA
#7 Providence †	24	18	5	1	2	1	0	54	86	46	34	23	9	2	116	74
#14 Massachusetts	24	14	9	1	2	1	1	43	63	53	34	21	12	1	97	80
#13 Connecticut	24	12	9	3	1	1	2	41	73	59	34	18	11	5	105	80
#17 Boston College	24	13	11	0	1	1	2	39	69	59	34	19	14	1	108	88
Maine	24	12	11	1	3	2	0	36	76	79	34	18	13	3	116	91
Boston University	24	12	12	0	3	2	0	35	69	74	34	16	16	2	98	104
Northeastern	24	11	13	0	1	3	0	35	67	62	34	16	17	1	90	84
Merrimack	24	10	12	2	0	1	1	34	68	75	34	17	15	2	109	101
Massachusetts Lowell	24	9	15	0	1	2	0	28	66	80	34	13	21	0	88	109
New Hampshire	24	8	15	1	0	0	1	26	41	73	34	14	19	1	65	98
Vermont	24	8	15	1	0	0	0	25	55	83	34	13	20	1	72	111
Championship: March 21, 2026 † indicates regular season champion * indicates conference tournament champion (Lamoriello Trophy); Rankings: USCHO Division I Men's Poll; updated March 8, 2026

== Schedule and results ==
Date	Time	Opponent^{#}	Rank^{#}	Site	TV	Decision	Result	Attendance	Record
Exhibition
October 4	7:00 pm	Brock*		Gutterson Fieldhouse • Burlington, Vermont (Exhibition)	ESPN+	Oster	W 5–2	2,434	
Regular Season
October 10	7:00 pm	St. Lawrence*		Gutterson Fieldhouse • Burlington, Vermont	ESPN+	Wright	W 2–1	2,426	1–0–0
October 12	4:00 pm	at St. Lawrence*		Appleton Arena • Canton, New York	ESPN+	Wright	L 2–5	1,473	1–1–0
October 17	8:00 pm	at St. Cloud State*		Herb Brooks National Hockey Center • St. Cloud, Minnesota	The CW	Wright	W 2–1 ^{OT}	3,002	2–1–0
October 18	7:00 pm	at St. Cloud State*		Herb Brooks National Hockey Center • St. Cloud, Minnesota	The CW	Wright	L 0–4	3,178	2–2–0
October 31	7:00 pm	at New Hampshire		Whittemore Center • Durham, New Hampshire	ESPN+	Wright	L 2–4	3,495	2–3–0 (0–1–0)
November 1	7:00 pm	at New Hampshire		Whittemore Center • Durham, New Hampshire	ESPN+	Wright	W 2–1	4,013	3–3–0 (1–1–0)
November 7	7:00 pm	#18 Boston College		Gutterson Fieldhouse • Burlington, Vermont	ESPN+	Wright	L 1–2	3,619	3–4–0 (1–2–0)
November 8	7:00 pm	#18 Boston College		Gutterson Fieldhouse • Burlington, Vermont	ESPN+	Wright	L 0–5	3,450	3–5–0 (1–3–0)
November 14	7:00 pm	at #8 Maine		Alfond Arena • Orono, Maine	ESPN+	Wright	L 0–7	4,980	3–6–0 (1–4–0)
November 15	7:30 pm	at #8 Maine		Alfond Arena • Orono, Maine	ESPN+	Mangbo	W 2–1	4,980	4–6–0 (2–4–0)
November 22	6:00 pm	Harvard*		Gutterson Fieldhouse • Burlington, Vermont	ESPN+	Wright	L 1–5	2,491	4–7–0
November 28	7:00 pm	at #13 Dartmouth*		Thompson Arena • Hanover, New Hampshire	ESPN+	Wright	L 2–7	3,794	4–8–0
December 5	7:00 pm	at #18 Boston University		Agganis Arena • Boston, Massachusetts	ESPN+	Mangbo	L 1–2	4,403	4–9–0 (2–5–0)
December 6	6:00 pm	at #18 Boston University		Agganis Arena • Boston, Massachusetts	ESPN+	Wright	W 3–2	4,305	5–9–0 (3–5–0)
December 13	6:00 pm	Army*		Gutterson Fieldhouse • Burlington, Vermont	ESPN+	Wright	L 0–3	2,103	5–10–0
December 29	6:00 pm	Merrimack		Gutterson Fieldhouse • Burlington, Vermont	ESPN+	Mangbo	L 4–5	2,565	5–11–0 (3–6–0)
January 3	6:00 pm	Rensselaer*		Gutterson Fieldhouse • Burlington, Vermont	ESPN+	Wright	W 3–0	2,303	6–11–0
January 9	7:00 pm	#16 Northeastern		Gutterson Fieldhouse • Burlington, Vermont	ESPN+	Wright	W 3–2	2,056	7–11–0 (4–6–0)
January 10	7:00 pm	#16 Northeastern		Gutterson Fieldhouse • Burlington, Vermont	ESPN+	Wright	W 5–3	2,208	8–11–0 (5–6–0)
January 16	7:00 pm	at #11 Connecticut		Toscano Family Ice Forum • Storrs, Connecticut	ESPN+	Mangbo	L 1–4	2,327	8–12–0 (5–7–0)
January 17	4:00 pm	at #11 Connecticut		Toscano Family Ice Forum • Storrs, Connecticut	ESPN+, NESN	Wright	W 4–2	2,305	9–12–0 (6–7–0)
January 23	7:00 pm	Massachusetts		Gutterson Fieldhouse • Burlington, Vermont	ESPN+	Wright	L 0–4	2,989	9–13–0 (6–8–0)
January 24	7:00 pm	Massachusetts		Gutterson Fieldhouse • Burlington, Vermont	ESPN+	Wright	L 0–1	3,158	9–14–0 (6–9–0)
January 30	7:00 pm	Stonehill*		Gutterson Fieldhouse • Burlington, Vermont	ESPN+	Wright	W 3–2 ^{OT}	1,992	10–14–0
January 31	7:30 pm	Stonehill*		Gutterson Fieldhouse • Burlington, Vermont	ESPN+	Wright	W 2–0	2,348	11–14–0
February 6	7:00 pm	at #11 Boston College		Conte Forum • Chestnut Hill, Massachusetts	ESPN+	Wright	W 6–1	5,591	12–14–0 (7–9–0)
February 7	7:00 pm	at #7 Providence		Schneider Arena • Providence, Rhode Island	ESPN+	Wright	L 1–6	3,068	12–15–0 (7–10–0)
February 13	7:00 pm	Massachusetts Lowell		Gutterson Fieldhouse • Burlington, Vermont	ESPN+	Wright	L 2–4	2,022	12–16–0 (7–11–0)
February 14	6:00 pm	Massachusetts Lowell		Gutterson Fieldhouse • Burlington, Vermont	ESPN+	Wright	L 2–5	2,130	12–17–0 (7–12–0)
February 20	7:00 pm	#7 Providence		Gutterson Fieldhouse • Burlington, Vermont	ESPN+	Wright	L 2–5	2,264	12–18–0 (7–13–0)
February 21	7:30 pm	#7 Providence		Gutterson Fieldhouse • Burlington, Vermont	ESPN+	Wright	L 3–5	2,118	12–19–0 (7–14–0)
February 27	7:00 pm	at Merrimack		J. Thom Lawler Rink • North Andover, Massachusetts	ESPN+	Wright	L 2–5	2,078	12–20–0 (7–15–0)
February 28	7:00 pm	at Merrimack		J. Thom Lawler Rink • North Andover, Massachusetts	ESPN+	Wright	T 4–4 ^{SOL}	2,378	12–20–1 (7–15–1)
March 7	7:00 pm	#18 Maine		Gutterson Fieldhouse • Burlington, Vermont	ESPN+	Wright	W 5–3	2,769	13–20–1 (8–15–1)
Hockey East Tournament
March 11	6:30 pm	at Boston University*		Agganis Arena • Boston, Massachusetts (Hockey East Opening Round)	ESPN+	Wright	L 1–4	1,931	13–21–1
*Non-conference game. ^{#}Rankings from USCHO.com Poll. All times are in Eastern Time. Source:

== Rankings ==
Poll	Week																											
Poll	Pre	1	2	3	4	5	6	7	8	9	10	11	12	13	14	15	16	17	18	19	20	21	22	23	24	25	26	27 (Final)
USCHO.com	NR	NR	NR	NR	NR	NR	NR	NR	NR	NR	NR	NR	–	NR	NR	NR	NR	NR	NR	RV								
USA Hockey	NR	NR	NR	NR	NR	NR	NR	NR	NR	NR	NR	NR	–	NR	NR	NR	NR	NR	NR	NR								

Note: USCHO did not release a poll in week 12.
Note: USA Hockey did not release a poll in week 12.
