= 2025–26 Northeastern Huskies men's ice hockey season =

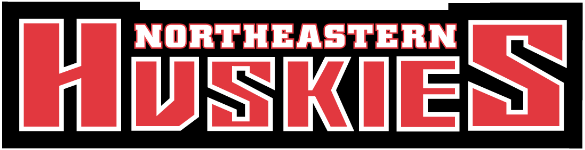
- Conference: Hockey East
- Home ice: Matthews Arena (Until Dec. 14)

Record
- Overall: 17–18–1
- Conference: 11–13–0
- Home: 9–5–0
- Road: 7–8–0
- Neutral: 1–3–1

Coaches and captains
- Head coach: Jerry Keefe
- Assistant coaches: Mike Levine; Matt Harlow; Brian Mahoney-Wilson
- Captain: Vinny Borgesi
- Alternate captain(s): Dylan Hryckowian; Joaquim Lemay; Andy Moore

The 2025–26 Northeastern Huskies Men's ice hockey season will be the 94th season of play for the program and 42nd in Hockey East. The Huskies will represent Northeastern University in the 2025–26 NCAA Division I men's ice hockey season, play their home games at Matthews Arena and be coached by Jerry Keefe in his 5th season.

== Season ==
In March of 2025, Northeastern announced plans for a new multi-purpose building that would serve as the ice hockey team's new home. Due to structural deficiencies found in Matthews Arena, it was determined that the oldest rink in North America could not be refurbished and would have to be demolished. Because the new facility would be built on the same site as Matthews Arena, the team would have to find alternate accommodations while construction progressed. The last game for the men's team at the Arena was on December 13, after which the team played their 'home' games at various facilities throughout the region.

== Departures ==
| Player | Position | Nationality | Cause |
|---|---|---|---|
| Jake Boltmann | Defenseman | United States | Graduation (retired) |
| Harrison Chesney | Goaltender | United States | Left program (retired) |
| Seth Constance | Defenseman | United States | Transferred to Colorado College |
| Jackson Dorrington | Defenseman | United States | Signed professional contract (New York Rangers) |
| Kyle Furey | Defenseman | United States | Left program (retired) |
| Jake Higgins | Defenseman | United States | Graduation (retired) |
| Cameron Lund | Forward | United States | Signed professional contract (San Jose Sharks) |
| Ryan McGuire | Forward | Canada | Graduation (signed with Iowa Heartlanders) |
| Billy Norcross | Forward | United States | Left program (retired) |
| Benjamin Poitras | Forward | Canada | Transferred to Brown |
| Nick Rhéaume | Forward | Canada | Signed professional contract (Toronto Marlies) |
| Cristophe Tellier | Forward | Canada | Graduation (signed with Savannah Ghost Pirates) |
| Cameron Whitehead | Goaltender | Canada | Signed professional contract (Vegas Golden Knights) |
| Jack Williams | Forward | United States | Signed professional contract (Columbus Blue Jackets) |

== Recruiting ==
| Player | Position | Nationality | Age | Notes |
|---|---|---|---|---|
| Grayson Badger | Forward | United States | 21 | Hyde Park, MA |
| Dylan Compton | Defenseman | Canada | 20 | Victoria, BC |
| Matthew DellaRusso | Goaltender | United States | 20 | Darien, CT |
| Dylan Finlay | Defenseman | United States | 23 | L'Île-Bizard, QC; transfer from Alaska Anchorage |
| Tyler Fukakusa | Forward | Canada | 23 | Toronto, ON; transfer from RIT |
| Amine Hajibi | Forward | Canada | 20 | Montréal, QC |
| Noah Jones | Defenseman | United States | 21 | Bridgewater, NJ |
| Matthew Maltais | Forward | Canada | 23 | Saint-Basile-le-Grand, QC |
| Giacomo Martino | Forward | Canada | 20 | Toronto, ON |
| Jacob Mathieu | Forward | Canada | 21 | Saint-Odilon-de-Cranbourne, QC |
| Austen May | Defenseman | United States | 22 | Woodhaven, MI; transfer from Providence |
| Jack Pechar | Forward | United States | 20 | Niskayuna, NY |
| Matthew Perkins | Forward | Canada | 21 | Balgonie, SK; transfer from Minnesota Duluth; selected 119th overall in 2023 |
| Lawton Zacher | Goaltender | United States | 21 | Buffalo, NY; transfer from Brown |

== Roster ==
As of August 18, 2025.

| No. | Nat. | Player | Class | Pos | Height | Weight | DoB | Hometown | Previous team | NHL rights |
|---|---|---|---|---|---|---|---|---|---|---|
| 1 | (United States) | Quentin Sigurdson | Sophomore | G | 6' 2" (1.88 m) | 170 lb (77 kg) | 2003-07-12 | Sartell, Minnesota | Chicago Steel (USHL) | — |
| 2 | (Canada) | Joaquim Lemay (A) | Senior | D | 6' 1" (1.85 m) | 184 lb (83 kg) | 2002-07-28 | Saint-Pierre-les-Becquets, Quebec | Omaha (USHL) | WSH, 119th overall 2021 |
| 4 | (Canada) | Dylan Compton | Freshman | D | 6' 0" (1.83 m) | 187 lb (85 kg) | 2005-01-09 | Victoria, British Columbia | Waterloo Black Hawks (USHL) | — |
| 5 | (United States) | Jack Henry | Sophomore | D | 6' 0" (1.83 m) | 190 lb (86 kg) | 2004-02-25 | Skaneateles, New York | Madison Capitols (USHL) | — |
| 6 | (United States) | Grayson Badger | Freshman | F | 6' 2" (1.88 m) | 187 lb (85 kg) | 2004-05-09 | Hyde Park, Massachusetts | Alberni Valley Bulldogs (BCHL) | — |
| 7 | (United States) | Andy Moore (A) | Junior | F | 5' 11" (1.8 m) | 195 lb (88 kg) | 2002-01-21 | Cumberland, Maine | Cedar Rapids RoughRiders (USHL) | — |
| 8 | (United States) | James Fisher | Sophomore | F | 6' 2" (1.88 m) | 185 lb (84 kg) | 2004-04-28 | Burlington, Massachusetts | Penticton Vees (BCHL) | CBJ, 203rd overall 2022 |
| 9 | (United States) | Noah Jones | Freshman | D | 6' 5" (1.96 m) | 212 lb (96 kg) | 2004-02-22 | Bridgewater, New Jersey | Omaha Lancers (USHL) | — |
| 10 | (United States) | Ethan Fredericks | Sophomore | F | 6' 2" (1.88 m) | 207 lb (94 kg) | 2004-11-22 | Sandy Springs, Georgia | Omaha Lancers (USHL) | — |
| 11 | (Canada) | Eli Sebastian | Junior | F | 5' 11" (1.8 m) | 190 lb (86 kg) | 2004-05-19 | Burlington, Ontario | Green Bay Gamblers (USHL) | — |
| 12 | (United States) | Nolan Hayes | Junior | D | 6' 1" (1.85 m) | 181 lb (82 kg) | 2002-08-14 | Boston, Massachusetts | West Kelowna Warriors (BCHL) | — |
| 13 | (Canada) | Dylan Hryckowian (A) | Junior | F | 5' 10" (1.78 m) | 180 lb (82 kg) | 2004-05-19 | L'Île-Bizard, Quebec | Cedar Rapids RoughRiders (USHL) | — |
| 14 | (United States) | Joe Connor | Sophomore | F | 6' 1" (1.85 m) | 200 lb (91 kg) | 1999-07-14 | Amherst, New Hampshire | Muskegon Lumberjacks (USHL) | TBL, 195th overall 2024 |
| 15 | (Canada) | Giacomo Martino | Freshman | F | 5' 11" (1.8 m) | 185 lb (84 kg) | 2004-02-22 | Toronto, Ontario | Sioux City Musketeers (USHL) | — |
| 17 | (United States) | Griffin Erdman | Sophomore | F | 5' 9" (1.75 m) | 187 lb (85 kg) | 2005-04-29 | Wilmington, Delaware | Waterloo Black Hawks (USHL) | — |
| 19 | (United States) | Marc Lund | Sophomore | F | 6' 4" (1.93 m) | 205 lb (93 kg) | 2003-04-29 | Edina, Minnesota | Fairbanks Ice Dogs (NAHL) | — |
| 21 | (United States) | Jack Pechar | Freshman | F | 6' 1" (1.85 m) | 198 lb (90 kg) | 2005-03-20 | Niskayuna, New York | Lincoln Stars (USHL) | — |
| 22 | (United States) | Vinny Borgesi (C) | Senior | D | 5' 8" (1.73 m) | 170 lb (77 kg) | 2004-03-02 | Philadelphia, Pennsylvania | Tri-City Storm (USHL) | — |
| 24 | (United States) | Austen May | Senior | D | 5' 11" (1.8 m) | 160 lb (73 kg) | 2003-05-19 | Woodhaven, Michigan | Providence (HEA) | — |
| 26 | (Canada) | Dylan Finlay | Senior | D | 6' 1" (1.85 m) | 178 lb (81 kg) | 2001-10-24 | L'Île-Bizard, Quebec | Alaska Anchorage (NCAA) | — |
| 33 | (Canada) | Amine Hajibi | Freshman | F | 6' 1" (1.85 m) | 185 lb (84 kg) | 2005-05-04 | Montréal, Quebec | Cedar Rapids RoughRiders (USHL) | — |
| 35 | (United States) | Matt DellaRusso | Freshman | G | 6' 3" (1.91 m) | 187 lb (85 kg) | 2004-10-28 | Darien, Connecticut | Maine Nordiques (NAHL) | — |
| 47 | (United States) | Lawton Zacher | Junior | G | 6' 2" (1.88 m) | 180 lb (82 kg) | 2003-12-31 | Buffalo, New York | Brown (ECAC) | — |
| 51 | (Canada) | Matthew Perkins | Junior | F | 5' 11" (1.8 m) | 156 lb (71 kg) | 2004-01-21 | Balgonie, Saskatchewan | Minnesota Duluth (NCHC) | VAN, 119th overall 2023 |
| 81 | (Canada) | Jacob Mathieu | Freshman | F | 5' 11" (1.8 m) | 192 lb (87 kg) | 2004-05-05 | Saint-Odilon-de-Cranbourne, Quebec | Rimouski Océanic (QMJHL) | — |
| 91 | (Canada) | Tyler Fukakusa | Junior | F | 5' 11" (1.8 m) | 180 lb (82 kg) | 2002-08-14 | Toronto, Ontario | RIT (AHA) | — |
| 92 | (Canada) | Matthew Maltais | Freshman | F | 6' 2" (1.88 m) | 183 lb (83 kg) | 2004-09-02 | Saint-Basile-le-Grand, Quebec | Lincoln Stars (USHL) | — |
| 93 | (United States) | Anthony Messuri | Senior | F | 5' 8" (1.73 m) | 170 lb (77 kg) | 2001-07-24 | Arlington, Massachusetts | Utica Jr. Comets (NCDC) | — |

== Standings ==
2025–26 Hockey East Standings
| | Conference record | | | | | | | | | | Overall record | | | | | |
| | GP | W | L | T | OTW | OTL | SW | PTS | GF | GA | GP | W | L | T | GF | GA |
|---|---|---|---|---|---|---|---|---|---|---|---|---|---|---|---|---|
| #7 Providence † | 24 | 18 | 5 | 1 | 2 | 1 | 0 | 54 | 86 | 46 | 35 | 23 | 10 | 2 | 118 | 77 |
| #14 Massachusetts | 24 | 14 | 9 | 1 | 2 | 1 | 1 | 43 | 63 | 53 | 35 | 22 | 12 | 1 | 101 | 81 |
| #13 Connecticut | 24 | 12 | 9 | 3 | 1 | 1 | 2 | 41 | 73 | 59 | 35 | 19 | 11 | 5 | 110 | 83 |
| #17 Boston College | 24 | 13 | 11 | 0 | 1 | 1 | 2 | 39 | 69 | 59 | 35 | 20 | 14 | 1 | 113 | 88 |
| Maine | 24 | 12 | 11 | 1 | 3 | 2 | 0 | 36 | 76 | 79 | 35 | 18 | 14 | 3 | 116 | 96 |
| Boston University | 24 | 12 | 12 | 0 | 3 | 2 | 0 | 35 | 69 | 74 | 36 | 17 | 17 | 2 | 105 | 110 |
| Northeastern | 24 | 11 | 13 | 0 | 1 | 3 | 0 | 35 | 67 | 62 | 36 | 17 | 18 | 1 | 98 | 91 |
| Merrimack | 24 | 10 | 12 | 2 | 0 | 1 | 1 | 34 | 68 | 75 | 36 | 19 | 15 | 2 | 117 | 106 |
| Massachusetts Lowell | 24 | 9 | 15 | 0 | 1 | 2 | 0 | 28 | 66 | 80 | 35 | 13 | 22 | 0 | 91 | 114 |
| New Hampshire | 24 | 8 | 15 | 1 | 0 | 0 | 1 | 26 | 41 | 73 | 35 | 14 | 20 | 1 | 68 | 105 |
| Vermont | 24 | 8 | 15 | 1 | 0 | 0 | 0 | 25 | 55 | 83 | 35 | 13 | 21 | 1 | 73 | 115 |
Championship: March 21, 2026 † indicates regular season champion * indicates conference tournament champion (Lamoriello Trophy); Rankings: USCHO Division I Men's Poll; updated March 16, 2026

== Schedule and results ==
| Date | Time | Opponent^{#} | Rank^{#} | Site | TV | Decision | Result | Attendance | Record |
Regular Season
| October 4 | 7:30 pm | Holy Cross* | | Matthews Arena • Boston, Massachusetts | ESPN+ | Zacher | W 6–4 | 3,216 | 1–0–0 |
| October 10 | 7:00 pm | Army* | | Matthews Arena • Boston, Massachusetts | ESPN+ | Zacher | L 1–2 | 3,198 | 1–1–0 |
| October 17 | 7:00 pm | at #11 Massachusetts | | Mullins Center • Amherst, Massachusetts | ESPN+ | Zacher | W 4–2 | 8,412 | 2–1–0 (1–0–0) |
| October 18 | 5:00 pm | Harvard* | | Matthews Arena • Boston, Massachusetts (Exhibition) | ESPN+ | DellaRusso | L 2–4 | 3,976 | |
| October 25 | 7:00 pm | #7 Denver* | | Matthews Arena • Boston, Massachusetts | ESPN+ | Zacher | W 1–0 | 4,499 | 3–1–0 |
| October 30 | 7:00 pm | at #11 Boston College | | Conte Forum • Chestnut Hill, Massachusetts | ESPN+ | Zacher | W 4–1 | 5,539 | 4–1–0 (2–0–0) |
| October 31 | 7:00 pm | #11 Boston College | | Matthews Arena • Boston, Massachusetts | ESPN+, NESN | Zacher | W 3–0 | 3,672 | 5–1–0 (3–0–0) |
| November 7 | 7:00 pm | Stonehill* | #14 | Matthews Arena • Boston, Massachusetts | ESPN+ | Zacher | W 2–0 | 2,465 | 6–1–0 |
| November 8 | 7:00 pm | Stonehill* | #14 | Matthews Arena • Boston, Massachusetts | ESPN+ | Zacher | W 4–2 | — | 7–1–0 |
| November 14 | 7:00 pm | at #14 Connecticut | #11 | Toscano Family Ice Forum • Storrs, Connecticut | ESPN+ | Zacher | L 2–4 | 2,531 | 7–2–0 (3–1–0) |
| November 15 | 7:30 pm | #14 Connecticut | #11 | Matthews Arena • Boston, Massachusetts | ESPN+ | Zacher | L 3–4 ^{OT} | 4,002 | 7–3–0 (3–2–0) |
| November 21 | 7:00 pm | #18 Boston University | #12 | Matthews Arena • Boston, Massachusetts | ESPN+ | Sigurdson | W 3–2 | 4,321 | 8–3–0 (4–2–0) |
| November 22 | 7:00 pm | at #18 Boston University | #12 | Agganis Arena • Boston, Massachusetts | ESPN+ | Sigurdson | L 3–4 ^{OT} | 5,913 | 8–4–0 (4–3–0) |
| November 29 | 4:00 pm | Brown* | #11 | Matthews Arena • Boston, Massachusetts | ESPN+ | Sigurdson | W 4–1 | 3,109 | 9–4–0 |
| December 6 | 7:00 pm | Massachusetts | #12 | Matthews Arena • Boston, Massachusetts | ESPN+ | Zacher | W 3–2 ^{OT} | 4,247 | 10–4–0 (5–3–0) |
| December 7 | 5:00 pm | Massachusetts | #12 | Matthews Arena • Boston, Massachusetts | ESPN+, NESN | Zacher | L 0–2 | 4,002 | 10–5–0 |
| December 13 | 7:00 pm | #20 Boston University | #11 | Matthews Arena • Boston, Massachusetts | ESPN+, NESN | Zacher | L 3–4 | 4,765 | 10–6–0 (5–4–0) |
| January 2 | 7:00 pm | at Army* | #12 | Tate Rink • West Point, New York | FloHockey | Zacher | L 2–5 | 2,588 | 10–7–0 |
| January 9 | 7:00 pm | at Vermont | #16 | Gutterson Fieldhouse • Burlington, Vermont | ESPN+ | Zacher | L 2–3 | 2,056 | 10–8–0 (5–5–0) |
| January 10 | 7:00 pm | at Vermont | #16 | Gutterson Fieldhouse • Burlington, Vermont | ESPN+ | Sigurdson | L 3–5 | 2,208 | 10–9–0 (5–6–0) |
| January 16 | 7:00 pm | at New Hampshire | | Whittemore Center • Durham, New Hampshire | ESPN+, NESN | Zacher | W 4–0 | 4,479 | 11–9–0 (6–6–0) |
| January 18 | 4:00 pm | vs. New Hampshire | | Walter Brown Arena • Boston, Massachusetts | ESPN+ | Zacher | W 5–2 | 225 | 12–9–0 (7–6–0) |
| January 23 | 7:00 pm | at Merrimack | | J. Thom Lawler Rink • North Andover, Massachusetts | ESPN+ | Zacher | L 1–4 | 1,789 | 12–10–0 (7–7–0) |
| January 25 | 4:00 pm | at Merrimack | | J. Thom Lawler Rink • North Andover, Massachusetts | ESPN+ | Zacher | L 1–3 | 2,446 | 12–11–0 (7–8–0) |
| January 30 | 7:00 pm | at Massachusetts | | Mullins Center • Amherst, Massachusetts | ESPN+ | Zacher | L 2–3 ^{OT} | 6,812 | 12–12–0 (7–9–0) |
Beanpot
| February 2 | 8:00 pm | vs. Boston University* | | TD Garden • Boston, Massachusetts (Beanpot Semifinal) | ESPN+, NESN | Zacher | T 2–2 ^{SOL} | — | 12–12–1 |
| February 6 | 7:00 pm | vs. #12 Connecticut | | Bentley Arena • Waltham, Massachusetts | ESPN+ | Zacher | L 0–2 ^{OT} | 550 | 12–13–1 (7–10–0) |
| February 9 | 4:30 pm | vs. Harvard* | | TD Garden • Boston, Massachusetts (Beanpot Consolation Game) | ESPN+, NESN | Zacher | L 1–4 | 18,258 | 12–14–1 |
| February 13 | 7:00 pm | at #7 Providence | | Schneider Arena • Providence, Rhode Island | ESPN+, NESN | Zacher | W 4–2 | 2,835 | 13–14–1 (8–10–0) |
| February 15 | 5:30 pm | at #7 Providence | | Schneider Arena • Providence, Rhode Island | ESPN+ | Zacher | L 1–4 | 2,621 | 13–15–1 (8–11–0) |
| February 20 | 7:00 pm | at Massachusetts Lowell | | Tsongas Center • Lowell, Massachusetts | ESPN+ | Zacher | W 2–0 | 2,442 | 14–15–1 (9–11–0) |
| February 21 | 6:05 pm | at Massachusetts Lowell | | Tsongas Center • Lowell, Massachusetts | ESPN+ | Zacher | W 8–2 | 5,134 | 15–15–1 (10–11–0) |
| February 27 | 7:00 pm | vs. #20 Maine | | Cross Insurance Arena • Portland, Maine | ESPN+ | Zacher | L 0–4 | 5,621 | 15–16–1 (10–12–0) |
| February 28 | 7:00 pm | vs. #20 Maine | | Tsongas Center • Lowell, Massachusetts | ESPN+ | Zacher | L 2–3 | 985 | 15–17–1 (10–13–0) |
| March 7 | 7:00 pm | at #13 Boston College | | Conte Forum • Chestnut Hill, Massachusetts | ESPN+, NESN | Zacher | W 4–2 | 5,974 | 16–17–1 (11–13–0) |
Hockey East Tournament
| March 11 | 7:00 pm | vs. New Hampshire* | | Conte Forum • Chestnut Hill, Massachusetts (Hockey East Opening Round) | ESPN+, NESN | Zacher | W 7–3 | 452 | 17–17–1 |
| March 14 | 4:00 pm | at #15 Massachusetts* | | Mullins Center • Amherst, Massachusetts (Hockey East Quarterfinal) | ESPN+ | Zacher | L 1–4 | 4,537 | 17–18–1 |
*Non-conference game. ^{#}Rankings from USCHO.com Poll. All times are in Eastern Time. Source:

== Rankings ==
| Poll | Week | | | | | | | | | | | | | | | | | | | | | | | | | | | |
| Poll | Pre | 1 | 2 | 3 | 4 | 5 | 6 | 7 | 8 | 9 | 10 | 11 | 12 | 13 | 14 | 15 | 16 | 17 | 18 | 19 | 20 | 21 | 22 | 23 | 24 | 25 | 26 | 27 (Final) |
|---|---|---|---|---|---|---|---|---|---|---|---|---|---|---|---|---|---|---|---|---|---|---|---|---|---|---|---|---|
| USCHO.com | RV | RV | RV | RV | RV | 14 | 11 | 12 | 11 | 12 | 11 | 13 | – | 12 | 16 | RV | NR | RV | RV | | | | | | | | | |
| USA Hockey | RV | RV | RV | RV | RV | 14 | 11 | 12 | 12 | 11 | 11 | 13 | – | 12 | 15т | RV | NR | RV | RV | | | | | | | | | |

Note: USCHO did not release a poll in week 12.
Note: USA Hockey did not release a poll in week 12.
