= 2025–26 UConn Huskies men's ice hockey season =

Connecticut Ice, Champion NCAA Tournament, Regional Semifinals
- Conference: Hockey East
- Home ice: Toscano Family Ice Forum; PeoplesBank Arena

Rankings
- USCHO: #13
- USA Hockey: #13

Record
- Overall: 20–13–5
- Conference: 12–9–3
- Home: 9–8–2
- Road: 8–3–3
- Neutral: 3–2–0

Coaches and captains
- Head coach: Mike Cavanaugh
- Assistant coaches: Tyler Helton; Vince Stalletti; Nick Peruzzi; Alex Westlund
- Captain: Tabor Heaslip
- Alternate captain(s): Viking Gustafsson Nyberg; Joey Muldowney; Ryan Tattle

The 2025–26 UConn Huskies men's ice hockey season was the 66th season of play for the program, the 28th at the Division I level, and the 12th in Hockey East. The Huskies represented the University of Connecticut in the 2025–26 NCAA Division I men's ice hockey season, played their home games at the Toscano Family Ice Forum and be coached by Mike Cavanaugh in his 13th season.

== Departures ==
Player	Position	Nationality	Cause
Nick Carabin	Defenseman	United States	Graduation (signed with Reading Royals)
Oliver Flynn	Forward	United States	Transferred to Amherst
Thomas Heaney	Goaltender	United States	Left program (retired)
Hugh Larkin	Forward	United States	Graduation (retired)
Jack Pascucci	Defenseman	United States	Transferred to Canisius
Hudson Schandor	Forward	Canada	Graduation (signed with Ontario Reign)
Filip Sitar	Defenseman	United States	Transferred to Rensselaer
John Spetz	Defenseman	United States	Graduation (retired)
Bauer Swift	Defenseman	United States	Graduation (retired)
Harrison Rees	Defenseman	Canada	Transferred to Hobart
Callum Tung	Goaltender	Canada	Signed professional contract (New York Rangers)

== Recruiting ==
Player	Position	Nationality	Age	Notes
Anthony Allain-Samaké	Defenseman	Canada	18	Gatineau, QC; selected 168th overall in 2025
Alexandre Blais	Forward	Canada	19	Longueuil, QC; selected 100th overall in 2024
Carlin Dezainde	Forward	Canada	20	Calgary, AB
Brendan Dunphy	Defenseman	United States	19	San Diego, CA; selected 197th overall in 2025
Kam Hendrickson	Goaltender	United States	19	Chanhassen, MN
Joseph Odyniec	Forward	United States	20	Washington, D.C.
Ryan Sanborn	Goaltender	United States	20	Brookfield, CT

== Roster ==
As of September 18, 2025.

No.	Nat.	Player	Class	Pos	Height	Weight	DoB	Hometown	Previous team	NHL rights
1	(United States)	Kam Hendrickson	Freshman	G	6' 2" (1.88 m)	185 lb (84 kg)	2006-01-09	Chanhassen, Minnesota	Waterloo Black Hawks (USHL)	—
2	(United States)	Brendan Dunphy	Freshman	D	6' 5" (1.96 m)	207 lb (94 kg)	2006-02-02	San Diego, California	Wenatchee Wild (USHL)	FLA, 197th overall 2025
3	(Canada)	Kevin Fitzgerald	Sophomore	D	5' 10" (1.78 m)	150 lb (68 kg)	2004-10-11	Bath, Ontario	Sioux City Musketeers (USHL)	—
6	(Sweden)	Viking Gustafsson Nyberg (A)	Junior	D	6' 6" (1.98 m)	205 lb (93 kg)	2003-09-21	Stockholm, Sweden	Northern Michigan (CCHA)	—
7	(United States)	Huston Karpman	Senior	F	5' 11" (1.8 m)	200 lb (91 kg)	2001-02-07	Manhattan Beach, California	Minot Minotauros (NAHL)	—
8	(United States)	Joey Muldowney (A)	Junior	F	5' 11" (1.8 m)	154 lb (70 kg)	2004-06-05	Lake View, New York	Des Moines Buccaneers (USHL)	SJS, 172nd overall 2022
9	(Canada)	Ryan Tattle (A)	Senior	F	5' 10" (1.78 m)	180 lb (82 kg)	2001-09-07	Port Moody, British Columbia	Coquitlam Express (BCHL)	—
10	(Canada)	Tristan Fraser	Senior	F	6' 0" (1.83 m)	190 lb (86 kg)	2001-11-13	West Vancouver, British Columbia	Nanaimo Clippers (BCHL)	—
11	(United States)	Kai Janviriya	Sophomore	D	5' 8" (1.73 m)	170 lb (77 kg)	2005-04-02	Bloomfield, Michigan	Lincoln Stars (USHL)	—
13	(United States)	Ethan Gardula	Sophomore	F	5' 11" (1.8 m)	174 lb (79 kg)	2005-02-28	Princeton, Massachusetts	Sioux City Musketeers (USHL)	—
15	(United States)	Thomas Messineo	Senior	D	6' 0" (1.83 m)	190 lb (86 kg)	2002-05-02	Westwood, Massachusetts	Chilliwack Chiefs (BCHL)	—
17	(United States)	Jake Percival	Senior	F	5' 10" (1.78 m)	180 lb (82 kg)	2002-02-11	Avon, Connecticut	Cedar Rapids RoughRiders (USHL)	—
19	(United States)	Jake Richard	Junior	F	6' 1" (1.85 m)	194 lb (88 kg)	2004-08-15	Jacksonville, Florida	Tri-City Storm (USHL)	BUF, 170th overall 2022
20	(United States)	Kaden Shahan	Sophomore	F	5' 11" (1.8 m)	170 lb (77 kg)	2005-05-24	Everett, Washington	Sioux City Musketeers (USHL)	—
21	(United States)	Trey Scott	Sophomore	D	5' 10" (1.78 m)	181 lb (82 kg)	2004-05-04	Lunenburg, Massachusetts	Omaha Lancers (USHL)	—
22	(Canada)	Alexandre Blais	Freshman	F	5' 10" (1.78 m)	176 lb (80 kg)	2005-11-14	Longueuil, Quebec	Rimouski Océanic (QMJHL)	ANA, 100th overall 2024
23	(United States)	Tabor Heaslip (C)	Senior	F	5' 9" (1.75 m)	175 lb (79 kg)	2001-12-17	Frisco, Texas	Sioux City Musketeers (USHL)	—
24	(Canada)	Carlin Dezainde	Freshman	F	5' 11" (1.8 m)	172 lb (78 kg)	2004-12-29	Calgary, Alberta	Swift Current Broncos (WHL)	—
26	(United States)	Mike Murtagh	Sophomore	F	5' 11" (1.8 m)	187 lb (85 kg)	2004-09-11	East Greenbush, New York	Nanaimo Clippers (BCHL)	—
27	(United States)	Joseph Odyniec	Freshman	F	6' 2" (1.88 m)	201 lb (91 kg)	2004-12-13	Washington, D.C.	Coquitlam Express (BCHL)	—
28	(Canada)	Anthony Allain-Samaké	Freshman	D	6' 2" (1.88 m)	183 lb (83 kg)	2007-09-10	Gatineau, Quebec	Sioux City Musketeers (USHL)	ANA, 168th overall 2025
30	(United States)	Tyler Muszelik	Senior	G	6' 3" (1.91 m)	190 lb (86 kg)	2004-07-01	Long Valley, New Jersey	New Hampshire (HEA)	FLA, 189th overall 2022
31	(United States)	Ryan Sanborn	Freshman	G	6' 2" (1.88 m)	190 lb (86 kg)	2005-01-15	Brookfield, Connecticut	Trenton Golden Hawks (OJHL)	—
34	(Canada)	Owen Simpson	Junior	D	6' 5" (1.96 m)	190 lb (86 kg)	2003-07-01	Toronto, Ontario	Penticton Vees (BCHL)	—
71	(Canada)	Ethan Whitcomb	Sophomore	F	6' 4" (1.93 m)	209 lb (95 kg)	2004-05-13	St. Catharines, Ontario	Muskegon Lumberjacks (USHL)	—

== Standings ==
2025–26 Hockey East Standings
	Conference record										Overall record					
	GP	W	L	T	OTW	OTL	SW	PTS	GF	GA	GP	W	L	T	GF	GA
#9 Providence †	24	18	5	1	2	1	0	54	86	46	36	23	11	2	120	82
#16 Massachusetts	24	14	9	1	2	1	1	43	63	53	36	22	13	1	101	83
#13 Connecticut	24	12	9	3	1	1	2	41	73	59	38	20	13	5	116	90
#19 Boston College	24	13	11	0	1	1	2	39	69	59	36	20	15	1	116	92
Maine	24	12	11	1	3	2	0	36	76	79	35	18	14	3	116	96
Boston University	24	12	12	0	3	2	0	35	69	74	36	17	17	2	105	110
Northeastern	24	11	13	0	1	3	0	35	67	62	36	17	18	1	98	91
#15 Merrimack *	24	10	12	2	0	1	1	34	68	75	39	21	16	2	121	110
Massachusetts Lowell	24	9	15	0	1	2	0	28	66	80	35	13	22	0	91	114
New Hampshire	24	8	15	1	0	0	1	26	41	73	35	14	20	1	68	105
Vermont	24	8	15	1	0	0	0	25	55	83	35	13	21	1	73	115
Championship: March 21, 2026 † indicates regular season champion * indicates conference tournament champion (Lamoriello Trophy); Rankings: USCHO Division I Men's Poll; updated April 15, 2026

== Schedule and results ==
Date	Time	Opponent^{#}	Rank^{#}	Site	TV	Decision	Result	Attendance	Record
Regular season
October 3	9:00 pm	at Colorado College*	#10	Ed Robson Arena • Colorado Springs, Colorado	SOCO CW	Muszelik	L 2–4	3,532	0–1–0
October 4	8:00 pm	at Colorado College*	#10	Ed Robson Arena • Colorado Springs, Colorado		Muszelik	W 5–1	3,532	1–1–0
October 17	7:00 pm	#16 Ohio State*	#12	Toscano Family Ice Forum • Storrs, Connecticut	ESPN+	Muszelik	W 3–2	2,513	2–1–0
October 18	4:00 pm	#16 Ohio State*	#12	PeoplesBank Arena • Hartford, Connecticut	ESPN+	Hendrickson	L 2–4	5,133	2–2–0
October 24	7:00 pm	#4 Boston University	#11	Agganis Arena • Boston, Massachusetts	ESPN+	Muszelik	W 8–4	5,464	3–2–0 (1–0–0)
October 25	5:00 pm	#4 Boston University	#11	Toscano Family Ice Forum • Storrs, Connecticut	ESPN+	Muszelik	L 1–3	2,513	3–3–0 (1–1–0)
October 31	7:00 pm	Harvard*	#9	Toscano Family Ice Forum • Storrs, Connecticut	ESPN+	Muszelik	T 1–1	2,292	3–3–1
November 1	7:00 pm	Merrimack	#9	Toscano Family Ice Forum • Storrs, Connecticut	ESPN+	Muszelik	W 5–1	2,397	4–3–1 (2–1–0)
November 7	7:00 pm	#15 Providence	#11	Toscano Family Ice Forum • Storrs, Connecticut	ESPN+	Muszelik	L 1–4	2,531	4–4–1 (2–2–0)
November 8	7:00 pm	at #15 Providence	#11	Schneider Arena • Providence, Rhode Island	ESPN+	Muszelik	T 2–2 ^{SOW}	2,796	4–4–2 (2–2–1)
November 14	7:00 pm	#11 Northeastern	#14	Toscano Family Ice Forum • Storrs, Connecticut	ESPN+	Muszelik	W 4–2	2,531	5–4–2 (3–2–1)
November 15	7:30 pm	at #11 Northeastern	#14	Matthews Arena • Boston, Massachusetts	ESPN+	Muszelik	W 4–3 ^{OT}	4,002	6–4–2 (4–2–1)
November 21	7:00 pm	at New Hampshire	#11	Whittemore Center • Durham, New Hampshire	ESPN+	Muszelik	W 4–1	5,688	7–4–2 (5–2–1)
November 22	6:30 pm	New Hampshire	#11	Toscano Family Ice Forum • Storrs, Connecticut	ESPN+	Hendrickson	L 3–4	2,248	7–5–2 (5–3–1)
November 25	7:00 pm	Stonehill*	#12	PeoplesBank Arena • Hartford, Connecticut	ESPN+	Muszelik	T 3–3 ^{OT}	4,138	7–5–3
December 5	7:00 pm	at Merrimack	#14	J. Thom Lawler Rink • North Andover, Massachusetts	ESPN+	Muszelik	W 3–0	1,978	8–5–3 (6–3–1)
December 6	4:00 pm	Merrimack	#14	Toscano Family Ice Forum • Storrs, Connecticut	ESPN+	Muszelik	W 5–2	2,439	9–5–3 (7–3–1)
December 31	3:00 pm	Long Island*	#11	Toscano Family Ice Forum • Storrs, Connecticut	ESPN+	Muszelik	W 4–1	2,513	10–5–3
January 3	2:00 pm	at Long Island*	#11	Northwell Health Ice Center • East Meadow, New York	ESPN+	Muszelik	W 3–1	656	11–5–3
January 9	7:00 pm	Massachusetts Lowell	#10	PeoplesBank Arena • Hartford, Connecticut	ESPN+	Muszelik	L 3–5	5,239	11–6–3 (7–4–1)
January 10	6:05 pm	at Massachusetts Lowell	#10	Tsongas Center • Lowell, Massachusetts	ESPN+, NESN	Hendrickson	W 5–1	5,323	12–6–3 (8–4–1)
January 16	7:00 pm	Vermont	#11	Toscano Family Ice Forum • Storrs, Connecticut	ESPN+	Muszelik	W 4–1	2,327	13–6–3 (9–4–1)
January 17	4:00 pm	Vermont	#11	Toscano Family Ice Forum • Storrs, Connecticut	ESPN+, NESN	Muszelik	L 2–4	2,305	13–7–3 (9–5–1)
Connecticut Ice
January 23	7:30 pm	at Yale*	#13	Ingalls Rink • New Haven, Connecticut (Connecticut Ice Semifinal)	YES	Muszelik	W 5–2	2,704	14–7–3
January 24	7:30 pm	vs. #6 Quinnipiac*	#13	Ingalls Rink • New Haven, Connecticut (Connecticut Ice Championship)	YES	Muszelik	W 4–2	2,521	15–7–3
Regular season
February 6	7:00 pm	vs. Northeastern	#12	Bentley Arena • Waltham, Massachusetts	ESPN+	Muszelik	W 4–1	550	16–7–3 (10–5–1)
February 13	7:00 pm	at Maine	#11	Alfond Arena • Orono, Maine	ESPN+	Muszelik	W 2–0	4,980	17–7–3 (11–5–1)
February 14	7:00 pm	at Maine	#11	Alfond Arena • Orono, Maine	ESPN+	Muszelik	T 3–3 ^{SOW}	4,900	17–7–4 (11–5–2)
February 20	7:00 pm	at #12 Boston College	#10	Conte Forum • Chestnut Hill, Massachusetts	ESPN+	Muszelik	L 2–5	6,585	17–8–4 (11–6–2)
February 21	3:00 pm	#12 Boston College	#10	PeoplesBank Arena • Hartford, Connecticut	ESPN+	Muszelik	L 1–2 ^{OT}	10,494	17–9–4 (11–7–2)
February 27	7:00 pm	#19 Massachusetts	#13	Toscano Family Ice Forum • Storrs, Connecticut	ESPN+, NESN	Muszelik	L 1–5	2,513	17–10–4 (11–8–2)
February 28	7:00 pm	at #19 Massachusetts	#13	Mullins Center • Amherst, Massachusetts	ESPN+	Muszelik	T 3–3 ^{SOL}	7,932	17–10–5 (11–8–3)
March 5	7:00 pm	New Hampshire	#14	Toscano Family Ice Forum • Storrs, Connecticut	ESPN+	Muszelik	W 4–1	2,513	18–10–5 (12–8–3)
March 7	4:00 pm	at #5 Providence	#14	Schneider Arena • Providence, Rhode Island	ESPN+, NESN	Muszelik	L 1–3	2,816	18–11–5 (12–9–3)
Hockey East Tournament
March 14	1:00 pm	Boston University*	#14	Toscano Family Ice Forum • Storrs, Connecticut (Hockey East Quarterfinal)	ESPN+, NESN+	Muszelik	W 5–3	2,513	19–11–5
March 20	7:00 pm	vs. #17 Boston College*	#13	TD Garden • Boston, Massachusetts (Hockey East Semifinal)	ESPN+, NESN+	Muszelik	W 4–3 ^{OT}	15,573	20–11–5
March 20	7:00 pm	vs. #17 Merrimack*	#13	TD Garden • Boston, Massachusetts (Hockey East Championship)	ESPN+, NESN	Muszelik	L 1–2 ^{OT}	15,759	20–12–5
NCAA Tournament
March 26	1:30 pm	vs. #3 Michigan State*	#13	DCU Center • Worcester, Massachusetts (Regional Semifinal)	ESPN2	Muszelik	L 1–2		20–13–5
*Non-conference game. ^{#}Rankings from USCHO.com Poll. All times are in Eastern Time. Source:

== Rankings ==
Poll	Week																											
Poll	Pre	1	2	3	4	5	6	7	8	9	10	11	12	13	14	15	16	17	18	19	20	21	22	23	24	25	26	27 (Final)
USCHO.com	10	13	12	11	9	11	14	11	12	14	12	11	–	11	10	11	13	12	12	11	10	13	14	14	13	13		
USA Hockey	10т	13	12	11	9	10	13т	10	13	15	13	11	–	11	11	11	13	12	12	11	11	14	15	14	14	13		

Note: USCHO did not release a poll in week 12.
Note: USA Hockey did not release a poll in week 12.
