= 2025–26 Providence Friars men's ice hockey season =

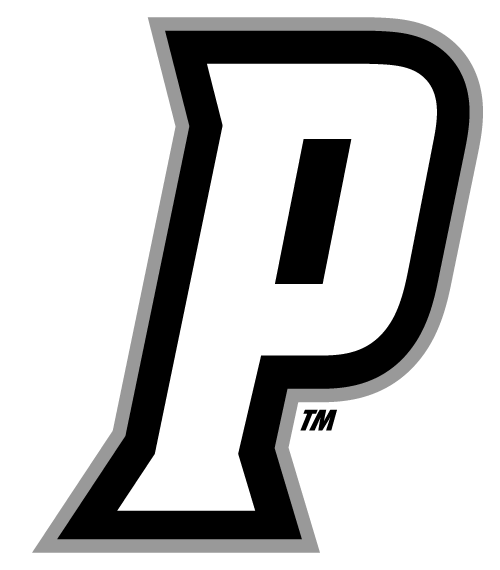

NCAA Tournament, Regional Semifinals
- Conference: Hockey East
- Home ice: Schneider Arena

Rankings
- USCHO: #7
- USA Hockey: #7

Record
- Overall: 23–11–2
- Conference: 18–5–1
- Home: 11–7–1
- Road: 12–3–1
- Neutral: 0–1–0

Coaches and captains
- Head coach: Nate Leaman
- Assistant coaches: Ron Rolston; Joel Beal; Joe Palmer
- Captain: Graham Gamache
- Alternate captain(s): Aleksi Kivioja; Tomas Machů; Hudson Malinoski

The 2025–26 Providence Friars Men's ice hockey season was the 75th season of play for the program and 42nd in Hockey East. The Friars represented Providence College in the 2025–26 NCAA Division I men's ice hockey season, played their home games at Schneider Arena and were coached by Nate Leaman in his 15th season.

== Departures ==
Player	Position	Nationality	Cause
Zachary Borgiel	Goaltender	United States	Graduation (retired)
Braiden Clark	Forward	United States	Returned to juniors (London Knights)
Trevor Connelly	Forward	United States	Signed professional contract (Vegas Golden Knights)
John Driscoll	Goaltender	United States	Graduation (retired)
Carl Fish	Defenseman	United States	Graduation (retired)
Cameron Gendron	Forward	United States	Graduation (retired)
Taige Harding	Defenseman	Canada	Graduation (signed with Chicago Blackhawks)
Connor Kelley	Defenseman	United States	Graduation (signed with Colorado Eagles)
Austen May	Defenseman	United States	Transferred to Northeastern
Samo Meritähti	Defenseman	Finland	Transferred to Augustana
Ryan O'Reilly	Forward	United States	Graduation (signed with Orlando Solar Bears)
Nick Poisson	Forward	Canada	Graduation (retired)
Guillaume Richard	Defenseman	Canada	Graduation (signed with Columbus Blue Jackets)
Logan Will	Forward	United States	Graduation (signed with Florida Everblades)
Chase Yoder	Forward	United States	Graduation (signed with Manitoba Moose)

== Recruiting ==
Player	Position	Nationality	Age	Notes
Jonathan Fauchon	Forward	Canada	21	Sainte-Claire, QC
Beau Jelsma	Forward	Canada	21	London, ON
Quinn Mantei	Defenseman	Canada	20	Weyburn, SK
Martin Masa	Defenseman	Czech Republic	20	Brno, CZE
Aaron Matthews	Goaltender	United States	21	Newton, MA
Kale McCallum	Defenseman	Canada	23	Fredericton, NB; transfer from New Brunswick
Donovan McCoy	Defenseman	Canada	20	Belleville, ON
Roger McQueen	Forward	Canada	18	Saskatoon, SK; selected 10th overall in 2025
Jack Parsons	Goaltender	United States	19	Ithaca, NY
Brendan Ross	Forward	Canada	22	Calgary, AB; transfer from Alaska
Alex Rybakov	Defenseman	Russia	20	Chelyabinsk, RUS
Julius Sumpf	Forward	Germany	20	München, GER; selected 98th overall in 2025

== Roster ==
As of August 28, 2025.

No.	Nat.	Player	Class	Pos	Height	Weight	DoB	Hometown	Previous team	NHL rights
2	(Czech Republic)	Tomas Machů (A)	Sophomore	D	6' 4" (1.93 m)	194 lb (88 kg)	2003-03-02	Ostrava, Czech Republic	Youngstown Phantoms (USHL)	NYI, 221st overall 2021
6	(United States)	Alexander Bales	Sophomore	D	5' 10" (1.78 m)	181 lb (82 kg)	2006-07-06	East Amherst, New York	Tri-City Storm (USHL)	—
9	(Canada)	Hudson Malinoski (A)	Junior	F	6' 1" (1.85 m)	184 lb (83 kg)	2004-05-19	Saskatoon, Saskatchewan	Brooks Bandits (AJHL)	TOR, 153rd overall 2023
10	(United States)	Donovan McCoy	Freshman	D	6' 1" (1.85 m)	205 lb (93 kg)	2004-10-11	Belleville, Ontario	Sudbury Wolves (OHL)	—
11	(Canada)	Graham Gamache (C)	Junior	F	5' 11" (1.8 m)	179 lb (81 kg)	2002-06-11	Edmonton, Alberta	Tri-City Storm (USHL)	—
13	(United States)	Geno McEnery	Sophomore	F	6' 0" (1.83 m)	190 lb (86 kg)	2003-10-21	Geneva, Illinois	Oklahoma Warriors (NAHL)	—
14	(Finland)	Aleksi Kivioja (A)	Sophomore	F	6' 5" (1.96 m)	220 lb (100 kg)	2003-08-02	Helsinki, Finland	Omaha Lancers (USHL)	—
15	(United States)	Will Elger	Sophomore	F	6' 2" (1.88 m)	174 lb (79 kg)	2004-12-29	Westerville, Ohio	Omaha Lancers (USHL)	—
16	(Canada)	Jonathan Fauchon	Freshman	F	5' 11" (1.8 m)	176 lb (80 kg)	2004-01-13	Sainte-Claire, Quebec	Rimouski Océanic (QMJHL)	—
17	(Canada)	Beau Jelsma	Freshman	F	5' 10" (1.78 m)	181 lb (82 kg)	2004-04-28	London, Ontario	Barrie Colts (OHL)	—
18	(Canada)	Brendan Ross	Sophomore	F	6' 3" (1.91 m)	187 lb (85 kg)	2003-07-08	Calgary, Alberta	Alaska (NCAA)	—
19	(United States)	Tanner Adams	Junior	F	5' 11" (1.8 m)	185 lb (84 kg)	2005-09-02	Northport, New York	Tri-City Storm (USHL)	—
20	(Canada)	Kale McCallum	Junior	D	5' 11" (1.8 m)	183 lb (83 kg)	2002-02-14	Fredericton, New Brunswick	New Brunswick (AUS)	—
21	(Canada)	John Mustard	Sophomore	F	6' 1" (1.85 m)	185 lb (84 kg)	2006-08-16	Newmarket, Ontario	Waterloo Black Hawks (USHL)	CHI, 67th overall 2024
22	(United States)	Clint Levens	Junior	F	6' 2" (1.88 m)	189 lb (86 kg)	2003-06-19	Windermere, Florida	Sioux Falls Stampede (USHL)	—
23	(United States)	Andrew Centrella	Junior	D	5' 9" (1.75 m)	177 lb (80 kg)	2004-01-29	Philadelphia, Pennsylvania	Youngstown Phantoms (USHL)	—
24	(United States)	Quinn Mantei	Freshman	D	6' 0" (1.83 m)	187 lb (85 kg)	2005-04-23	Weyburn, Saskatchewan	Brandon Wheat Kings (WHL)	—
26	(Germany)	Julius Sumpf	Freshman	F	6' 2" (1.88 m)	190 lb (86 kg)	2005-01-11	München, Germany	Moncton Wildcats (QMJHL)	CHI, 98th overall 2025
27	(Russia)	Alex Rybakov	Freshman	D	6' 2" (1.88 m)	190 lb (86 kg)	2005-01-14	Chelyabinsk, Russia	Sioux Falls Stampede (USHL)	—
28	(Czech Republic)	Martin Masa	Freshman	D	6' 2" (1.88 m)	194 lb (88 kg)	2005-07-14	Brno, Czech Republic	Cedar Rapids RoughRiders (USHL)	—
29	(Canada)	Roger McQueen	Freshman	F	6' 6" (1.98 m)	198 lb (90 kg)	2006-10-02	Saskatoon, Saskatchewan	Brandon Wheat Kings (WHL)	ANA, 10th overall 2025
30	(United States)	Jack Parsons	Freshman	G	6' 4" (1.93 m)	194 lb (88 kg)	2006-01-15	Ithaca, New York	Chicago Steel (USHL)	—
33	(United States)	Aaron Matthews	Freshman	G	6' 4" (1.93 m)	170 lb (77 kg)	2004-03-06	Newton, Massachusetts	Rockets Hockey Club (NCDC)	—
34	(Canada)	Logan Sawyer	Sophomore	F	6' 1" (1.85 m)	174 lb (79 kg)	2006-05-06	Orangeville, Ontario	Brooks Bandits (BCHL)	MTL, 78th overall 2024
35	(Sweden)	Philip Svedebäck	Senior	G	6' 4" (1.93 m)	210 lb (95 kg)	2002-05-28	Växjö, Sweden	Dubuque Fighting Saints (USHL)	BOS, 117th overall 2021

== Standings ==
2025–26 Hockey East Standings
	Conference record										Overall record					
	GP	W	L	T	OTW	OTL	SW	PTS	GF	GA	GP	W	L	T	GF	GA
#7 Providence †	24	18	5	1	2	1	0	54	86	46	35	23	10	2	118	77
#15 Massachusetts	24	14	9	1	2	1	1	43	63	53	36	22	13	1	101	83
#13 Connecticut	24	12	9	3	1	1	2	41	73	59	37	20	12	5	115	88
#19 Boston College	24	13	11	0	1	1	2	39	69	59	36	20	15	1	116	92
Maine	24	12	11	1	3	2	0	36	76	79	35	18	14	3	116	96
Boston University	24	12	12	0	3	2	0	35	69	74	36	17	17	2	105	110
Northeastern	24	11	13	0	1	3	0	35	67	62	36	17	18	1	98	91
#16 Merrimack *	24	10	12	2	0	1	1	34	68	75	38	21	15	2	121	107
Massachusetts Lowell	24	9	15	0	1	2	0	28	66	80	35	13	22	0	91	114
New Hampshire	24	8	15	1	0	0	1	26	41	73	35	14	20	1	68	105
Vermont	24	8	15	1	0	0	0	25	55	83	35	13	21	1	73	115
Championship: March 21, 2026 † indicates regular season champion * indicates conference tournament champion (Lamoriello Trophy); Rankings: USCHO Division I Men's Poll; updated March 22, 2026

== Schedule and results ==
Date	Time	Opponent^{#}	Rank^{#}	Site	TV	Decision	Result	Attendance	Record
Exhibition
October 3	7:00 pm	Simon Fraser*	#9	Schneider Arena • Providence, Rhode Island (Exhibition)	ESPN+	Svedebäck	W 7–1		
October 5	2:00 pm	#13 Quinnipiac*	#9	Schneider Arena • Providence, Rhode Island (Exhibition)	ESPN+	Svedebäck	W 2–1		
Regular Season
October 10	7:00 pm	#9 Michigan*	#7	Schneider Arena • Providence, Rhode Island	ESPN+, NESN	Svedebäck	L 1–5	2,933	0–1–0
October 11	7:00 pm	#9 Michigan*	#7	Schneider Arena • Providence, Rhode Island	ESPN+	Svedebäck	L 1–3	2,630	0–2–0
October 18	4:00 pm	at Rensselaer*	#14	Houston Field House • Troy, New York	ESPN+	Svedebäck	W 5–1	1,407	1–2–0
October 24	8:07 pm	at St. Thomas*	#15	Lee & Penny Anderson Arena • Saint Paul, Minnesota	Midco Sports+	Svedebäck	T 2–2 ^{OT}	4,325	1–2–1
October 25	8:07 pm	at St. Thomas*	#15	Lee & Penny Anderson Arena • Saint Paul, Minnesota	Midco Sports+	Parsons	W 7–4	3,313	2–2–1
October 31	7:00 pm	Massachusetts Lowell	#16	Schneider Arena • Providence, Rhode Island	ESPN+	Svedebäck	W 5–2	2,010	3–2–1 (1–0–0)
November 1	6:05 pm	at Massachusetts Lowell	#16	Tsongas Center • Lowell, Massachusetts	ESPN+, NESN	Parsons	L 1–5	4,970	3–3–1 (1–1–0)
November 7	7:00 pm	at #11 Connecticut	#15	Toscano Family Ice Forum • Storrs, Connecticut	ESPN+	Svedebäck	W 4–1	2,531	4–3–1 (2–1–0)
November 8	7:00 pm	#11 Connecticut	#15	Schneider Arena • Providence, Rhode Island	ESPN+	Svedebäck	T 2–2 ^{SOL}	2,796	4–3–2 (2–1–1)
November 14	7:00 pm	Merrimack	#15	Schneider Arena • Providence, Rhode Island	ESPN+	Svedebäck	W 4–2	2,914	5–3–2 (3–1–1)
November 15	6:00 pm	at Merrimack	#15	J. Thom Lawler Rink • North Andover, Massachusetts	ESPN+	Svedebäck	L 2–3	2,496	5–4–2 (3–2–1)
November 20	7:00 pm	#17 Massachusetts	#16	Schneider Arena • Providence, Rhode Island	ESPN+, NESN	Svedebäck	L 1–2 ^{OT}	2,656	5–5–2 (3–3–1)
November 22	7:00 pm	at #17 Massachusetts	#16	Mullins Center • Amherst, Massachusetts	ESPN+	Svedebäck	W 5–1	4,828	6–5–2 (4–3–1)
November 28	9:00 pm	at Colorado College*	#16	Ed Robson Arena • Colorado Springs, Colorado	SOCO CW, NESN	Svedebäck	L 2–3	3,407	6–6–2
November 29	8:00 pm	at Colorado College*	#16	Ed Robson Arena • Colorado Springs, Colorado		Svedebäck	W 2–1	3,407	7–6–2
December 9	7:00 pm	Brown*	#16	Schneider Arena • Providence, Rhode Island (Mayor's Cup)	ESPN+	Svedebäck	W 4–2	1,247	8–6–2
January 2	7:00 pm	Alaska*	#16	Schneider Arena • Providence, Rhode Island	ESPN+	Svedebäck	W 5–2	2,134	9–6–2
January 3	5:00 pm	Alaska*	#16	Schneider Arena • Providence, Rhode Island	ESPN+	Parsons	L 1–5	2,442	9–7–2
January 9	7:00 pm	#12 Maine	#18	Schneider Arena • Providence, Rhode Island	ESPN+, NESN	Parsons	W 6–1	2,510	10–7–2 (5–3–1)
January 10	6:00 pm	#12 Maine	#18	Schneider Arena • Providence, Rhode Island	ESPN+	Parsons	W 3–0	2,776	11–7–2 (6–3–1)
January 16	7:00 pm	at #12 Boston College	#14	Conte Forum • Chestnut Hill, Massachusetts	ESPNU, TSN2	Parsons	W 4–3 ^{OT}	7,884	12–7–2 (7–3–1)
January 17	7:00 pm	#12 Boston College	#14	Schneider Arena • Providence, Rhode Island	ESPN+	Parsons	W 4–3	2,967	13–7–2 (8–3–1)
January 23	7:00 pm	#18 Boston University	#11	Schneider Arena • Providence, Rhode Island	ESPN+	Parsons	W 4–3	2,808	14–7–2 (9–3–1)
January 24	7:00 pm	at #18 Boston University	#11	Agganis Arena • Boston, Massachusetts	ESPN+	Parsons	W 4–0	4,894	15–7–2 (10–3–1)
January 31	7:00 pm	at #17 Maine	#9	Alfond Arena • Orono, Maine	ESPN+	Parsons	W 3–2 ^{OT}	4,980	16–7–2 (11–3–1)
February 6	7:00 pm	at New Hampshire	#7	Whittemore Center • Durham, New Hampshire	ESPN+	Parsons	W 6–1	4,594	17–7–2 (12–3–1)
February 7	7:00 pm	Vermont	#7	Schneider Arena • Providence, Rhode Island	ESPN+	Parsons	W 6–1	3,068	18–7–2 (13–3–1)
February 13	7:00 pm	Northeastern	#7	Schneider Arena • Providence, Rhode Island	ESPN+, NESN	Parsons	L 2–4	2,835	18–8–2 (13–4–1)
February 14	5:30 pm	Northeastern	#7	Schneider Arena • Providence, Rhode Island	ESPN+	Simpson	W 4–1	2,621	19–8–2 (14–4–1)
February 20	7:00 pm	at Vermont	#7	Gutterson Fieldhouse • Burlington, Vermont	ESPN+	Parsons	W 5–2	2,264	20–8–2 (15–4–1)
February 21	7:30 pm	at Vermont	#7	Gutterson Fieldhouse • Burlington, Vermont	ESPN+	Parsons	W 5–3	2,118	21–8–2 (16–4–1)
February 27	7:00 pm	New Hampshire	#6	Schneider Arena • Providence, Rhode Island	ESPN+	Parsons	L 0–1	3,046	21–9–2 (16–5–1)
February 28	7:00 pm	at New Hampshire	#6	Whittemore Center • Durham, New Hampshire	ESPN+	Simpson	W 3–2	4,854	22–9–2 (17–5–1)
March 7	4:00 pm	#14 Connecticut	#5	Schneider Arena • Providence, Rhode Island	ESPN+	Parsons	W 3–1	2,816	23–9–2 (18–5–1)
Hockey East Tournament
March 14	7:00 pm	Merrimack*	#5	Schneider Arena • Providence, Rhode Island (Hockey East Quarterfinal)	ESPN+, NESN+	Parsons	L 2–3 ^{OT}	2,798	23–10–2
NCAA Tournament
March 26	5:00 pm	vs. #11 Quinnipiac*	#7	Denny Sanford Premier Center • Sioux Falls, South Dakota (Regional Semifinal)	ESPN+	Parsons	L 2–5	5,114	23–11–2
*Non-conference game. ^{#}Rankings from USCHO.com Poll. All times are in Eastern Time. Source:

== Rankings ==
Poll	Week																											
Poll	Pre	1	2	3	4	5	6	7	8	9	10	11	12	13	14	15	16	17	18	19	20	21	22	23	24	25	26	27 (Final)
USCHO.com	9	7	14	15	16	15	15	16	16	16	16	16	–	16	18	14	11	9	7	7	7	6	5	5	7	7		
USA Hockey	8т	6	13	14	15	15	15	16	17	17	17	16т	–	15	17	14	11	9	7	6	7	6	5	5	7	11		

Note: USCHO did not release a poll in week 12.
Note: USA Hockey did not release a poll in week 12.
