= 2025–26 Boston College Eagles men's ice hockey season =

Beanpot, Champion
- Conference: Hockey East
- Home ice: Kelley Rink

Rankings
- USCHO.com: #19
- USA Hockey: #19

Record
- Overall: 20–15–1
- Conference: 13–11–0
- Home: 8–8–0
- Road: 9–5–1
- Neutral: 3–2–0

Coaches and captains
- Head coach: Greg Brown
- Assistant coaches: Mike Ayers; Brendan Buckley; Brent Darnell
- Captain(s): Brady Berard; Andre Gasseau; Lukas Gustafsson

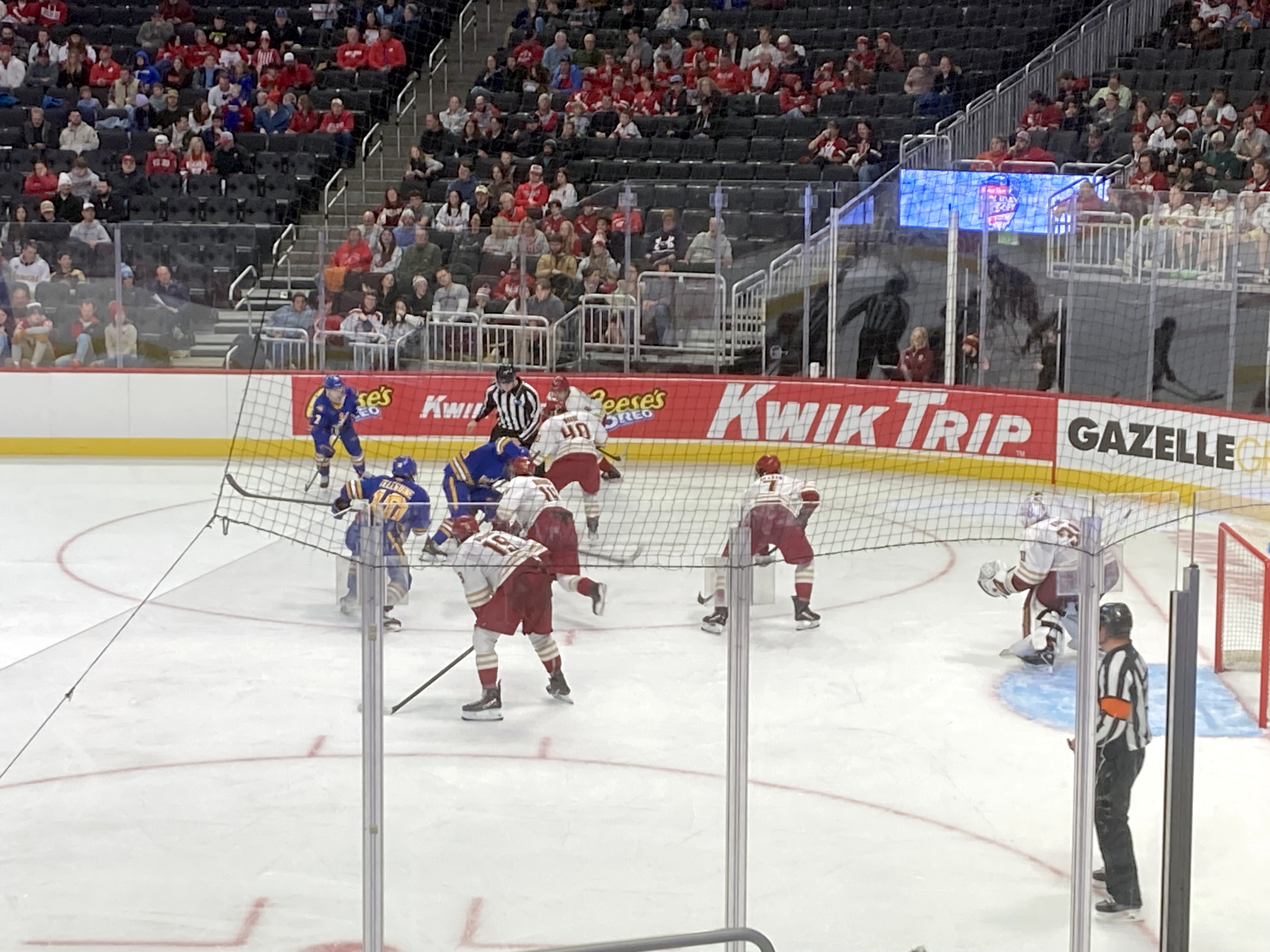
Boston College playing Lake Superior State during the 2025 Holiday Face–Off in Milwaukee

The 2025–26 Boston College Eagles men's ice hockey season was the 104th season of play for the program and the 42nd in Hockey East. The Eagles represented Boston College in the 2025–26 NCAA Division I men's ice hockey season, played their home games at Kelley Rink and were coached by Greg Brown in his 4th season.

== Departures ==
Player	Position	Nationality	Cause
Jacob Fowler	Goaltender	United States	Signed professional contract (Montreal Canadiens)
Aidan Hreschuk	Defenseman	United States	Graduation (signed with Texas Stars)
Connor Joyce	Forward	United States	Graduation (retired)
Ryan Leonard	Forward	United States	Signed professional contract (Washington Capitals)
Gabe Perreault	Forward	Canada	Signed professional contract (New York Rangers)
Mike Posma	Forward	United States	Graduation (signed with Florida Everblades)
Eamon Powell	Defenseman	United States	Graduation (signed with Charlotte Checkers)
Gentry Shamburger	Forward	United States	Graduation (retired)

== Recruiting ==
Player	Position	Nationality	Age	Notes
Louka Cloutier	Goaltender	Canada	19	Sherbrooke, QC; selected 132nd overall in 2024
Ryan Conmy	Forward	United States	20	Alexandria, VA; transfer from New Hampshire; selected 182nd overall in 2023
Gavin Cornforth	Forward	United States	18	Boston, MA
Kristian Kostadinski	Defenseman	Sweden	20	Göteborg, SWE; selected 220th overall in 2023
Will Moore	Forward	Canada	18	Woodbury, MN; selected 51st overall in 2025
Luka Radivojevič	Defenseman	Slovakia	18	Edina, MN
Landan Resendes	Forward	United States	19	Marlborough, MA

== Roster ==
As of September 7, 2025.

No.	Nat.	Player	Class	Pos	Height	Weight	DoB	Hometown	Previous team	NHL rights
1	(Canada)	Louka Cloutier	Freshman	G	6' 2" (1.88 m)	168 lb (76 kg)	2006-08-22	Sherbrooke, Quebec	Chicago Steel (USHL)	COL, 132nd overall 2024
2	(Sweden)	Kristian Kostadinski	Freshman	D	6' 6" (1.98 m)	220 lb (100 kg)	2005-05-20	Göteborg, Sweden	USNTDP (USHL)	BOS, 220th overall 2023
4	(United States)	Teddy Stiga	Sophomore	F	5' 10" (1.78 m)	179 lb (81 kg)	2006-04-05	Sudbury, Massachusetts	USNTDP (USHL)	NSH, 55th overall 2024
5	(United States)	Drew Fortescue	Junior	D	6' 2" (1.88 m)	170 lb (77 kg)	2005-04-28	Pearl River, New York	USNTDP (USHL)	NYR, 90th overall 2023
7	(United States)	Will Skahan	Sophomore	D	6' 4" (1.93 m)	216 lb (98 kg)	2006-05-14	Orange, California	USNTDP (USHL)	UTA, 65th overall 2024
8	(United States)	Lukas Gustafsson (C)	Senior	D	5' 10" (1.78 m)	190 lb (86 kg)	2002-12-16	Atlanta, Georgia	Chicago Steel (USHL)	—
10	(United States)	James Hagens	Sophomore	F	5' 10" (1.78 m)	172 lb (78 kg)	2006-11-03	Hauppauge, New York	USNTDP (USHL)	BOS, 7th overall 2025
11	(United States)	Michael Hagens	Sophomore	D	5' 11" (1.8 m)	170 lb (77 kg)	2002-08-07	Hauppauge, New York	Chicago Steel (USHL)	—
12	(United States)	Jake Sondreal	Sophomore	F	5' 11" (1.8 m)	163 lb (74 kg)	2004-02-19	Woodbury, Minnesota	Dubuque Fighting Saints (USHL)	—
14	(United States)	Landan Resendes	Freshman	F	5' 10" (1.78 m)	183 lb (83 kg)	2005-12-10	Marlborough, Massachusetts	Youngstown Phantoms (USHL)	—
15	(Sweden)	Oskar Jellvik	Junior	F	5' 11" (1.8 m)	180 lb (82 kg)	2003-02-08	Täby, Sweden	Djurgårdens J20 (J20 Nationell)	BOS, 149th overall 2021
17	(United States)	Aram Minnetian	Junior	D	5' 11" (1.8 m)	194 lb (88 kg)	2005-03-19	Woodcliff Lake, New Jersey	USNTDP (USHL)	DAL, 125th overall 2023
18	(United States)	Paul Davey	Senior	F	6' 2" (1.88 m)	195 lb (88 kg)	2003-01-11	Greenwich, Connecticut	Des Moines Buccaneers (USHL)	—
19	(United States)	Brady Berard (C)	Senior	F	6' 1" (1.85 m)	198 lb (90 kg)	2004-02-26	East Greenwich, Rhode Island	Providence (HEA)	—
22	(United States)	Will Vote	Junior	F	5' 8" (1.73 m)	161 lb (73 kg)	2005-02-22	Arlington, Massachusetts	USNTDP (USHL)	—
23	(United States)	Will Traeger	Senior	F	5' 8" (1.73 m)	172 lb (78 kg)	2002-04-10	Mendota Heights, Minnesota	New Jersey Hitmen (NCDC)	—
24	(United States)	Andre Gasseau (C)	Senior	F	6' 4" (1.93 m)	215 lb (98 kg)	2003-07-03	Garden Grove, California	Fargo Force (USHL)	BOS, 213th overall 2021
26	(Slovakia)	Luka Radivojevič	Freshman	D	5' 10" (1.78 m)	172 lb (78 kg)	2007-01-03	Edina, Minnesota	Muskegon Lumberjacks (USHL)	—
27	(United States)	Nolan Joyce	Junior	D	6' 1" (1.85 m)	192 lb (87 kg)	2003-09-25	Dedham, Massachusetts	Chicago Steel (USHL)	—
28	(United States)	Timmy Delay	Junior	F	6' 1" (1.85 m)	170 lb (77 kg)	2003-06-16	Hingham, Massachusetts	Chilliwack Chiefs (BCHL)	—
29	(Canada)	Dean Letourneau	Sophomore	F	6' 7" (2.01 m)	214 lb (97 kg)	2006-02-21	Braeside, Ontario	St. Andrew's College (Midget AAA)	BOS, 25th overall 2024
30	(Slovakia)	Jan Korec	Junior	G	6' 1" (1.85 m)	185 lb (84 kg)	2004-09-28	Bratislava, Slovakia	Des Moines Buccaneers (USHL)	—
31	(United States)	Alex Musielak	Junior	G	6' 4" (1.93 m)	183 lb (83 kg)	2003-07-23	Buffalo, New York	Kemptville 73's (CCHL)	—
36	(United States)	Ryan Conmy	Junior	F	5' 10" (1.78 m)	190 lb (86 kg)	2004-10-23	Alexandria, Virginia	New Hampshire (HEA)	LAK, 182nd overall 2023
37	(United States)	Gavin Cornforth	Freshman	F	5' 10" (1.78 m)	170 lb (77 kg)	2006-12-15	Boston, Massachusetts	Dubuque Fighting Saints (USHL)	—
40	(Canada)	Will Moore	Freshman	F	6' 3" (1.91 m)	181 lb (82 kg)	2007-03-24	Mississauga, Ontario	USNTDP (USHL)	BOS, 51st overall 2025

== Standings ==
2025–26 Hockey East Standings
	Conference record										Overall record					
	GP	W	L	T	OTW	OTL	SW	PTS	GF	GA	GP	W	L	T	GF	GA
#9 Providence †	24	18	5	1	2	1	0	54	86	46	36	23	11	2	120	82
#16 Massachusetts	24	14	9	1	2	1	1	43	63	53	36	22	13	1	101	83
#13 Connecticut	24	12	9	3	1	1	2	41	73	59	38	20	13	5	116	90
#19 Boston College	24	13	11	0	1	1	2	39	69	59	36	20	15	1	116	92
Maine	24	12	11	1	3	2	0	36	76	79	35	18	14	3	116	96
Boston University	24	12	12	0	3	2	0	35	69	74	36	17	17	2	105	110
Northeastern	24	11	13	0	1	3	0	35	67	62	36	17	18	1	98	91
#15 Merrimack *	24	10	12	2	0	1	1	34	68	75	39	21	16	2	121	110
Massachusetts Lowell	24	9	15	0	1	2	0	28	66	80	35	13	22	0	91	114
New Hampshire	24	8	15	1	0	0	1	26	41	73	35	14	20	1	68	105
Vermont	24	8	15	1	0	0	0	25	55	83	35	13	21	1	73	115
Championship: March 21, 2026 † indicates regular season champion * indicates conference tournament champion (Lamoriello Trophy); Rankings: USCHO Division I Men's Poll; updated April 15, 2026

== Schedule and results ==
Date	Time	Opponent^{#}	Rank^{#}	Site	TV	Decision	Result	Attendance	Record
Regular Season
October 3	7:00 pm	#13 Quinnipiac*	#6	Conte Forum • Chestnut Hill, Massachusetts	ESPN+	Korec	L 3–4	7,884	0–1–0
October 9	9:00 pm	at #12 Minnesota*	#11	3M Arena at Mariucci • Minneapolis, Minnesota	BTN	Cloutier	W 3–1	8,145	1–1–0
October 10	7:00 pm	at #12 Minnesota*	#11	3M Arena at Mariucci • Minneapolis, Minnesota		Cloutier	T 2–2 ^{OT}	9,279	1–1–1
October 17	7:00 pm	at Rensselaer*	#9	Houston Field House • Troy, New York	ESPN+, SNY	Cloutier	W 5–1	2,293	2–1–1
October 24	7:00 pm	#7 Denver*	#9	Conte Forum • Chestnut Hill, Massachusetts	ESPN+	Cloutier	L 3–7	7,884	2–2–1
October 30	7:00 pm	Northeastern	#11	Conte Forum • Chestnut Hill, Massachusetts	ESPN+	Korec	L 1–4	5,539	2–3–1 (0–1–0)
October 31	7:00 pm	at Northeastern	#11	Matthews Arena • Boston, Massachusetts	ESPN+, NESN	Cloutier	L 0–3	3,672	2–4–1 (0–2–0)
November 7	7:00 pm	at Vermont	#18	Gutterson Fieldhouse • Burlington, Vermont	ESPN+	Cloutier	W 2–1	3,619	3–4–1 (1–2–0)
November 8	7:00 pm	at Vermont	#18	Gutterson Fieldhouse • Burlington, Vermont	ESPN+	Cloutier	W 5–0	3,450	4–4–1 (2–2–0)
November 14	7:00 pm	#12 Massachusetts	#18	Conte Forum • Chestnut Hill, Massachusetts	ESPN+, NESN	Cloutier	W 7–3	7,884	5–4–1 (3–2–0)
November 15	7:00 pm	at #12 Massachusetts	#18	Mullins Center • Amherst, Massachusetts	ESPN+	Cloutier	W 4–0	7,211	6–4–1 (4–2–0)
November 21	7:00 pm	#10 Maine	#15	Conte Forum • Chestnut Hill, Massachusetts	ESPN+, NESN	Cloutier	W 7–3	7,884	7–4–1 (5–2–0)
November 22	7:00 pm	#10 Maine	#15	Conte Forum • Chestnut Hill, Massachusetts	ESPN+	Cloutier	L 0–3	7,046	7–5–1 (5–3–0)
November 28	1:00 pm	Notre Dame*	#15	Conte Forum • Chestnut Hill, Massachusetts (Holy War on Ice)	ESPN+, NESN	Cloutier	W 5–3	7,230	8–5–1
December 5	7:15 pm	at Massachusetts Lowell	#15	Tsongas Center • Lowell, Massachusetts	ESPN+	Cloutier	W 3–1	6,143	9–5–1 (6–3–0)
December 6	7:00 pm	Massachusetts Lowell	#15	Conte Forum • Chestnut Hill, Massachusetts	ESPN+	Cloutier	W 3–1	5,332	10–5–1 (7–3–0)
Holiday Face–Off
December 28	5:00 pm	vs. #7 Western Michigan*	#12	Fiserv Forum • Milwaukee, Wisconsin (Holiday Face–Off Semifinal)	B1G+	Cloutier	L 2–5	8,277	10–6–1
December 29	5:00 pm	vs. Lake Superior State*	#13	Fiserv Forum • Milwaukee, Wisconsin (Holiday Face–Off Consolation Game)	B1G+	Korec	W 4–3	7,002	11–6–1
January 9	7:00 pm	Stonehill*	#13	Conte Forum • Chestnut Hill, Massachusetts (Exhibition)	ESPN+	Cloutier	W 8–2	5,595	
January 16	7:00 pm	#14 Providence	#12	Conte Forum • Chestnut Hill, Massachusetts	ESPNU, TSN2	Cloutier	L 3–4 ^{OT}	7,884	11–7–1 (7–4–0)
January 17	7:00 pm	at #14 Providence	#12	Schneider Arena • Providence, Rhode Island	ESPN+	Cloutier	L 3–4	2,967	11–8–1 (7–5–0)
January 23	7:00 pm	New Hampshire	#15	Conte Forum • Chestnut Hill, Massachusetts	ESPN+	Cloutier	W 5–2	7,491	12–8–1 (8–5–0)
January 24	7:00 pm	at New Hampshire	#15	Whittemore Center • Durham, New Hampshire	ESPN+	Cloutier	W 3–0	6,501	13–8–1 (9–5–0)
January 30	7:00 pm	at Boston University	#13	Agganis Arena • Boston, Massachusetts (Rivalry)	ESPN+, NESN	Cloutier	W 4–1	6,150	14–8–1 (10–5–0)
Beanpot
February 2	5:00 pm	vs. Harvard*	#11	TD Garden • Boston, Massachusetts (Beanpot Semifinal)	ESPN+, NESN	Cloutier	W 5–1	—	15–8–1
February 6	7:00 pm	Vermont	#11	Conte Forum • Chestnut Hill, Massachusetts	ESPN+	Cloutier	L 1–6	5,591	15–9–1 (10–6–0)
February 9	7:30 pm	vs. Boston University*	#14	TD Garden • Boston, Massachusetts (Beanpot Championship, Rivalry)	ESPN+, NESN, TSN3	Cloutier	W 6–2	18,258	16–9–1
February 13	7:00 pm	at Merrimack	#14	J. Thom Lawler Rink • North Andover, Massachusetts	ESPN+	Cloutier	L 2–4	2,853	16–10–1 (10–7–0)
February 14	7:00 pm	Merrimack	#14	Conte Forum • Chestnut Hill, Massachusetts	ESPN+	Cloutier	W 4–2	5,383	17–10–1 (11–7–0)
February 20	7:00 pm	#10 Connecticut	#12	Conte Forum • Chestnut Hill, Massachusetts	ESPN+	Cloutier	W 5–2	6,585	18–10–1 (12–7–0)
February 21	3:00 pm	at #10 Connecticut	#12	PeoplesBank Arena • Hartford, Connecticut	ESPN+	Cloutier	W 2–1 ^{OT}	10,494	19–10–1 (13–7–0)
February 27	7:00 pm	at Boston University	#11	Agganis Arena • Boston, Massachusetts (Rivalry)	ESPN+	Cloutier	L 1–3	5,726	19–11–1 (13–8–0)
February 28	7:00 pm	Boston University	#11	Conte Forum • Chestnut Hill, Massachusetts (Rivalry)	ESPN+, NESN	Cloutier	L 1–5	7,593	19–12–1 (13–9–0)
March 5	7:00 pm	at #17 Massachusetts	#13	Mullins Center • Amherst, Massachusetts	ESPN+	Cloutier	L 1–2	7,002	19–13–1 (13–10–0)
March 7	7:00 pm	Northeastern	#13	Conte Forum • Chestnut Hill, Massachusetts	ESPN+, NESN	Cloutier	L 2–4	5,974	19–14–1 (13–11–0)
Hockey East Tournament
March 13	7:00 pm	Maine*	#17	Conte Forum • Chestnut Hill, Massachusetts (Hockey East Quarterfinal)	ESPN+, NESN	Cloutier	W 5–0	5,695	20–14–1
March 20	7:00 pm	vs. #13 Connecticut*	#17	TD Garden • Boston, Massachusetts (Hockey East Semifinal)	ESPN+, NESN+	Cloutier	L 3–4 ^{OT}	15,573	20–15–1
*Non-conference game. ^{#}Rankings from USCHO.com Poll. All times are in Eastern Time. Source:

== Rankings ==
Poll	Week																											
Poll	Pre	1	2	3	4	5	6	7	8	9	10	11	12	13	14	15	16	17	18	19	20	21	22	23	24	25	26	27 (Final)
USCHO.com	6	11	9	9	11	18	18	15	15	15	13	12	–	13	13	12	15	13	11	14	12	11	13	17	17	19		
USA Hockey	6	10	9	9	10	17	16	15	15	14	12	12	–	13	13	13	14т	14	13	14	13	11	13	16	17	19		

Note: USCHO did not release a poll in week 12.
Note: USA Hockey did not release a poll in week 12.
