= 2025–26 UMass Minutemen ice hockey season =

- Conference: Hockey East
- Home ice: Mullins Center

Rankings
- USCHO: #15
- USA Hockey: #15

Record
- Overall: 22–13–1
- Conference: 14–9–1
- Home: 11–6–1
- Road: 11–6–0
- Neutral: 0–1–0

Coaches and captains
- Head coach: Greg Carvel
- Assistant coaches: Tom Upton; Nolan Gluchowski
- Captain(s): Owen Murray; Lucas Ölvestad

The 2025–26 UMass Minutemen ice hockey season was the 94th season of play for the program, the 33rd at the Division I level, and 32nd in Hockey East. The Minutemen represented the University of Massachusetts Amherst in the 2025–26 NCAA Division I men's ice hockey season, played their home games at Mullins Center and be coached by Greg Carvel, in his 10th season.

== Departures ==
Player	Position	Nationality	Cause
Linden Alger	Defenseman	United States	Graduation (signed with Tahoe Knight Monsters)
Michael Cameron	Forward	United States	Left program (retired)
Kenny Connors	Forward	United States	Signed professional contract (Los Angeles Kings)
Ryan Lautenbach	Forward	United States	Graduation (signed with San Diego Gulls)
Dans Ločmelis	Forward	Latvia	Signed professional contract (Boston Bruins)
Finn Loftus	Defenseman	United States	Transferred to St. Cloud State
Lucas Mercuri	Forward	Canada	Graduation (signed with Tampa Bay Lightning)
Joey Musa	Forward	United States	Graduation (signed with Dogs de Cholet)
Cole O'Hara	Forward	Canada	Signed professional contract (Nashville Predators)
Aydar Suniev	Forward	Russia	Signed professional contract (Calgary Flames)

== Recruiting ==
Player	Position	Nationality	Age	Notes
Mikey DeAngelo	Forward	United States	20	Itasca, IL; transfer from Michigan State
Jack Galanek	Forward	United States	19	Hopkinton, MA
Coleson Hanrahan	Defenseman	United States	20	Longmeadow, MA
Justin Kerr	Forward	United States	21	Grand Rapids, MN
Lukáš Klečka	Forward	Slovakia	20	Bratislava, SVK
A. J. Lacroix	Forward	United States	20	Livingston, NJ
Owen Mehlenbacher	Forward	Canada	21	Fort Erie, ON; transfer from Wisconsin; selected 201st overall in 2022
Václav Nestrašil	Forward	Czech Republic	18	Prague, CZE; selected 25th overall in 2025
Landon Nycz	Defenseman	United States	17	Detroit, MI
Matthew Wilde	Forward	Canada	23	Mississauga, ON; transfer from RIT
Elias Zimmerman	Forward	Sweden	20	Gävle, SWE

== Roster ==
As of September 18, 2025.

No.	Nat.	Player	Class	Pos	Height	Weight	DoB	Hometown	Previous team	NHL rights
1	(United States)	Jackson Irving	Junior	G	6' 0" (1.83 m)	172 lb (78 kg)	2004-02-03	Newbury, Massachusetts	Sioux Falls Stampede (USHL)	—
2	(United States)	Coleson Hanrahan	Freshman	D	5' 10" (1.78 m)	187 lb (85 kg)	2005-04-16	Longmeadow, Massachusetts	Youngstown Phantoms (USHL)	—
4	(United States)	Kennedy O'Connor	Senior	D	6' 2" (1.88 m)	194 lb (88 kg)	2001-05-10	Springfield, Massachusetts	Omaha Lancers (USHL)	—
6	(Sweden)	Lucas Ölvestad (C)	Senior	D	6' 1" (1.85 m)	190 lb (86 kg)	2002-03-19	Stockholm, Sweden	Denver (NCHC)	—
7	(Canada)	Owen Mehlenbacher	Junior	F	6' 2" (1.88 m)	189 lb (86 kg)	2004-01-26	Fort Erie, Ontario	Wisconsin (Big Ten)	DET, 201st overall 2022
8	(United States)	Cam O'Neill	Junior	F	6' 0" (1.83 m)	183 lb (83 kg)	2004-01-24	Odenton, Maryland	Tri-City Storm (USHL)	OTT, 143rd overall 2022
9	(United States)	Jack Musa	Junior	F	5' 9" (1.75 m)	157 lb (71 kg)	2003-07-22	Orange Park, Florida	Cedar Rapids RoughRiders (USHL)	—
10	(United States)	Jack Galanek	Freshman	F	6' 0" (1.83 m)	176 lb (80 kg)	2006-06-04	Hopkinton, Massachusetts	Muskegon Lumberjacks (USHL)	—
11	(Czech Republic)	Václav Nestrašil	Freshman	F	6' 6" (1.98 m)	190 lb (86 kg)	2007-04-06	Prague, Czech Republic	Muskegon Lumberjacks (USHL)	CHI, 25th overall 2025
12	(Slovakia)	Lukáš Klečka	Freshman	F	5' 11" (1.8 m)	179 lb (81 kg)	2005-04-12	Bratislava, Slovakia	Södertälje SK J20 (J20 Nationell)	—
13	(United States)	Landon Nycz	Freshman	D	6' 3" (1.91 m)	201 lb (91 kg)	2007-10-04	Detroit, Michigan	Sioux City Musketeers (USHL)	—
14	(United States)	A. J. Lacroix	Freshman	F	6' 0" (1.83 m)	194 lb (88 kg)	2005-04-25	Livingston, New Jersey	Brooks Bandits (BCHL)	—
15	(United States)	Justin Kerr	Freshman	F	6' 5" (1.96 m)	205 lb (93 kg)	2004-01-08	Grand Rapids, Minnesota	Youngstown Phantoms (USHL)	—
17	(Slovakia)	Daniel Jenčko	Sophomore	F	5' 9" (1.75 m)	165 lb (75 kg)	2005-01-09	Humenné, Slovakia	Youngstown Phantoms (USHL)	—
18	(Canada)	Larry Keenan	Sophomore	D	6' 3" (1.91 m)	185 lb (84 kg)	2005-03-15	Midhurst, Ontario	Penticton Vees (BCHL)	DET, 117th overall 2024
19	(United States)	Mikey DeAngelo	Sophomore	F	5' 11" (1.8 m)	198 lb (90 kg)	2004-11-19	Itasca, Illinois	Michigan State (Big Ten)	—
20	(United States)	James Duerr	Sophomore	F	6' 2" (1.88 m)	190 lb (86 kg)	2004-09-01	Chicago, Illinois	Green Bay Gamblers	—
21	(United States)	Charlie Lieberman	Sophomore	D	5' 11" (1.8 m)	187 lb (85 kg)	2003-05-22	Naperville, Illinois	Omaha Lancers (USHL)	—
22	(United States)	Nick Van Tassell	Junior	F	6' 4" (1.93 m)	196 lb (89 kg)	2004-04-18	Basking Ridge, New Jersey	Green Bay Gamblers (USHL)	OTT, 215th overall 2023
23	(Canada)	Francesco Dell'Elce	Sophomore	D	6' 0" (1.83 m)	181 lb (82 kg)	2005-01-09	King City, Ontario	Penticton Vees (BCHL)	COL, 77th overall 2025
24	(Sweden)	Elias Zimmerman	Freshman	F	6' 6" (1.98 m)	216 lb (98 kg)	2005-08-08	Gävle, Sweden	Fargo Force (USHL)	—
25	(United States)	Cam Dunn	Sophomore	F	6' 2" (1.88 m)	170 lb (77 kg)	2003-10-08	Holland, Michigan	Odessa Jackalopes (NAHL)	—
26	(Canada)	Owen Murray (C)	Senior	D	5' 10" (1.78 m)	181 lb (82 kg)	2002-12-01	Decker, Manitoba	Green Bay Gamblers (USHL)	—
28	(United States)	Bo Cosman	Junior	F	6' 3" (1.91 m)	192 lb (87 kg)	2002-01-18	Milton, Georgia	Minnesota Wilderness (NAHL)	—
29	(Canada)	Matthew Wilde	Junior	D	6' 2" (1.88 m)	198 lb (90 kg)	2002-04-30	Mississauga, Ontario	RIT (AHA)	—
30	(Czech Republic)	Michael Hrabal	Junior	G	6' 6" (1.98 m)	209 lb (95 kg)	2005-01-20	Prague, Czech Republic	Omaha Lancers (USHL)	UTA, 38th overall 2023
32	(Canada)	James Norton	Sophomore	G	6' 4" (1.93 m)	183 lb (83 kg)	2003-04-16	Scarborough, Ontario	Cedar Rapids RoughRiders (USHL)	—

== Standings ==
2025–26 Hockey East Standings
	Conference record										Overall record					
	GP	W	L	T	OTW	OTL	SW	PTS	GF	GA	GP	W	L	T	GF	GA
#7 Providence †	24	18	5	1	2	1	0	54	86	46	35	23	10	2	118	77
#15 Massachusetts	24	14	9	1	2	1	1	43	63	53	36	22	13	1	101	83
#13 Connecticut	24	12	9	3	1	1	2	41	73	59	37	20	12	5	115	88
#19 Boston College	24	13	11	0	1	1	2	39	69	59	36	20	15	1	116	92
Maine	24	12	11	1	3	2	0	36	76	79	35	18	14	3	116	96
Boston University	24	12	12	0	3	2	0	35	69	74	36	17	17	2	105	110
Northeastern	24	11	13	0	1	3	0	35	67	62	36	17	18	1	98	91
#16 Merrimack *	24	10	12	2	0	1	1	34	68	75	38	21	15	2	121	107
Massachusetts Lowell	24	9	15	0	1	2	0	28	66	80	35	13	22	0	91	114
New Hampshire	24	8	15	1	0	0	1	26	41	73	35	14	20	1	68	105
Vermont	24	8	15	1	0	0	0	25	55	83	35	13	21	1	73	115
Championship: March 21, 2026 † indicates regular season champion * indicates conference tournament champion (Lamoriello Trophy); Rankings: USCHO Division I Men's Poll; updated March 22, 2026

== Schedule and results ==
Date	Time	Opponent^{#}	Rank^{#}	Site	TV	Decision	Result	Attendance	Record
Regular Season
October 4	7:30 pm	Northern Michigan*	#15	Mullins Center • Amherst, Massachusetts	ESPN+	Hrabal	W 5–3	6,093	1–0–0
October 5	4:00 pm	Northern Michigan*	#15	Mullins Center • Amherst, Massachusetts	ESPN+	Hrabal	W 4–1	3,104	2–0–0
October 10	7:00 pm	at Stonehill*	#14	Warrior Ice Arena • Boston, Massachusetts		Hrabal	W 4–1	415	3–0–0
October 17	7:00 pm	Northeastern	#11	Mullins Center • Amherst, Massachusetts	ESPN+	Hrabal	L 2–4	8,412	3–1–0 (0–1–0)
October 18	7:30 pm	Bentley*	#11	Mullins Center • Amherst, Massachusetts	ESPN+	Hrabal	W 5–4 ^{OT}	6,108	4–1–0
October 24	8:00 pm	at Omaha*	#13	Baxter Arena • Omaha, Nebraska		Hrabal	W 5–4	6,451	5–1–0
October 25	8:00 pm	at Omaha*	#13	Baxter Arena • Omaha, Nebraska		Hrabal	L 2–5	6,148	5–2–0
October 31	7:00 pm	#20 Cornell*	#13	Mullins Center • Amherst, Massachusetts	ESPN+	Hrabal	W 2–1	3,081	6–2–0
November 1	6:00 pm	#20 Cornell*	#13	Mullins Center • Amherst, Massachusetts	ESPN+	Hrabal	L 1–3	3,619	6–3–0
November 6	7:00 pm	#6 Maine	#13	Mullins Center • Amherst, Massachusetts	ESPN+	Irving	L 2–6	3,625	6–4–0 (0–2–0)
November 7	7:00 pm	#6 Maine	#13	Mullins Center • Amherst, Massachusetts	ESPN+, NESN	Irving	W 4–0	4,330	7–4–0 (1–2–0)
November 14	7:00 pm	at #18 Boston College	#12	Conte Forum • Chestnut Hill, Massachusetts	ESPN+, NESN	Irving	L 3–7	7,884	7–5–0 (1–3–0)
November 15	7:00 pm	#18 Boston College	#12	Mullins Center • Amherst, Massachusetts	ESPN+	Irving	L 0–4	7,211	7–6–0 (1–4–0)
November 20	7:00 pm	at #16 Providence	#17	Schneider Arena • Providence, Rhode Island	ESPN+	Irving	W 2–1 ^{OT}	2,656	8–6–0 (2–4–0)
November 22	7:00 pm	#16 Providence	#17	Mullins Center • Amherst, Massachusetts	ESPN+	Irving	L 1–5	4,828	8–7–0 (2–5–0)
November 29	4:00 pm	at Army*	#18	Tate Rink • West Point, New York	FloHockey	Hrabal	L 4–5	1,858	8–8–0
December 6	7:00 pm	at #12 Northeastern		Matthews Arena • Boston, Massachusetts	ESPN+	Hrabal	L 2–3 ^{OT}	4,247	8–9–0 (2–6–0)
December 7	5:00 pm	at #12 Northeastern*		Matthews Arena • Boston, Massachusetts	ESPN+, NESN	Irving	W 2–0	4,002	9–9–0
January 9	7:00 pm	#19 Boston University		Mullins Center • Amherst, Massachusetts	ESPN+	Hrabal	L 0–1	4,036	9–10–0 (2–7–0)
January 10	6:00 pm	at #19 Boston University		Agganis Arena • Boston, Massachusetts	ESPN+	Hrabal	W 2–0	5,148	10–10–0 (3–7–0)
January 16	7:00 pm	at Merrimack		J. Thom Lawler Rink • North Andover, Massachusetts	ESPN+	Hrabal	W 4–2	2,647	11–10–0 (4–7–0)
January 17	7:00 pm	Merrimack		Mullins Center • Amherst, Massachusetts	ESPN+	Hrabal	W 3–1	4,116	12–10–0 (5–7–0)
January 23	7:00 pm	at Vermont		Gutterson Fieldhouse • Burlington, Vermont	ESPN+	Hrabal	W 4–0	2,989	13–10–0 (6–7–0)
January 24	7:00 pm	at Vermont		Gutterson Fieldhouse • Burlington, Vermont	ESPN+	Hrabal	W 1–0	3,158	14–10–0 (7–7–0)
January 30	7:00 pm	Northeastern		Mullins Center • Amherst, Massachusetts	ESPN+	Hrabal	W 3–2 ^{OT}	6,812	15–10–0 (8–7–0)
February 1	3:30 pm	at Massachusetts Lowell		Tsongas Center • Lowell, Massachusetts	ESPN+, NESN	Hrabal	W 6–4	5,703	16–10–0 (9–7–0)
February 6	7:15 pm	at Massachusetts Lowell	#19	Tsongas Center • Lowell, Massachusetts	ESPN+	Hrabal	L 1–3	4,482	16–11–0 (9–8–0)
February 7	7:00 pm	Massachusetts Lowell	#19	Mullins Center • Amherst, Massachusetts	ESPN+, NESN	Hrabal	W 5–2	5,226	17–11–0 (10–8–0)
February 20	7:00 pm	New Hampshire	#19	Mullins Center • Amherst, Massachusetts	ESPN+	Hrabal	W 4–0	7,216	18–11–0 (11–8–0)
February 21	7:00 pm	at New Hampshire	#19	Whittemore Center • Durham, New Hampshire	ESPN+, NESN	Hrabal	L 0–1	5,269	18–12–0 (11–9–0)
February 27	7:00 pm	at #13 Connecticut	#19	Toscano Family Ice Forum • Storrs, Connecticut	ESPN+	Hrabal	W 5–1	2,513	19–12–0 (12–9–0)
February 28	7:00 pm	#13 Connecticut	#19	Mullins Center • Amherst, Massachusetts	ESPN+	Hrabal	T 3–3 ^{SOW}	7,932	19–12–1 (12–9–1)
March 5	7:00 pm	#13 Boston College	#17	Mullins Center • Amherst, Massachusetts	ESPN+	Hrabal	W 2–1	7,002	20–12–1 (13–9–1)
March 7	7:00 pm	at New Hampshire	#17	Whittemore Center • Durham, New Hampshire	ESPN+	Hrabal	W 4–2	6,227	21–12–1 (14–9–1)
Hockey East Tournament
March 14	7:00 pm	Northeastern*	#15	Mullins Center • Amherst, Massachusetts (Hockey East Quarterfinal)	ESPN+, NESN+	Hrabal	W 4–1	4,537	22–12–1
March 20	4:00 pm	vs. Merrimack*	#14	TD Garden • Boston, Massachusetts (Hockey East Semifinal)	ESPN+, NESN+	Hrabal	L 0–2	15,573	22–13–1
*Non-conference game. ^{#}Rankings from USCHO.com Poll. All times are in Eastern Time. Source:

== Rankings ==
Poll	Week																											
Poll	Pre	1	2	3	4	5	6	7	8	9	10	11	12	13	14	15	16	17	18	19	20	21	22	23	24	25	26	27 (Final)
USCHO.com	15	14	11	13	13	13	12	17	18	RV	RV	RV	–	RV	RV	RV	RV	RV	19	19	19	19	17	15	14	15		
USA Hockey	15	14	11	13	13	12	13т	18	19	RV	RV	RV	–	RV	RV	RV	RV	RV	19	19	19	19	17	15	13	15		

Note: USCHO did not release a poll in week 12.
Note: USA Hockey did not release a poll in week 12.
