= 2025–26 Hockey East men's season =

- Season: 2025–26
- Conference: Hockey East
- Division: Division I
- Sport: men's ice hockey
- Duration: October 3, 2025– March 20, 2026
- Number of teams: 11
- TV partner(s): ESPN+, NESN

NHL Entry Draft

Regular Season
- Season champions: Providence
- Top scorer: James Hagens

Hockey East tournament

NCAA tournament

The 2025–26 Hockey East men's season will be the 42nd season of play for Hockey East and take place during the 2025–26 NCAA Division I men's ice hockey season. The season will begin on October 3, 2025, and the conference tournament is set to concluded on March 20, 2026.

== Coaches ==
=== Records ===
Team	Head coach	Season at school	Record at school	Hockey East record
Boston College	Greg Brown	4	75–30–9	46–18–8
Boston University	Jay Pandolfo	4	81–35–4	50–18–4
Connecticut	Mike Cavanaugh	13	181–194–42	94–102–23
Maine	Ben Barr	5	69–58–17	41–42–13
Massachusetts	Greg Carvel	10	170–133–25	99–92–21
Massachusetts Lowell	Norm Bazin	15	278–185–47	162–127–38
Merrimack	Scott Borek	8	89–124–12	60–93–10
New Hampshire	Michael Souza	8	91–119–27	53–90–22
Northeastern	Jerry Keefe	5	73–62–12	45–43–8
Providence	Nate Leaman	15	280–174–67	165–117–49
Vermont	Steve Wiedler	3	24–40–6	13–30–35

== Preseason ==
Coaches were polled prior to the season and asked to rank member programs. Coaches were not permitted to vote for their own team.

=== Poll ===
Rank	Team
1	Boston University (7)
2	Providence (3)
3	Connecticut
4	Maine (1)
5	Boston College
6	Massachusetts
7	Massachusetts Lowell
8	Northeastern
9	Merrimack
10	New Hampshire
11	Vermont

== Standings ==
2025–26 Hockey East Standings
	Conference record										Overall record					
	GP	W	L	T	OTW	OTL	SW	PTS	GF	GA	GP	W	L	T	GF	GA
#9 Providence †	24	18	5	1	2	1	0	54	86	46	36	23	11	2	120	82
#16 Massachusetts	24	14	9	1	2	1	1	43	63	53	36	22	13	1	101	83
#13 Connecticut	24	12	9	3	1	1	2	41	73	59	38	20	13	5	116	90
#19 Boston College	24	13	11	0	1	1	2	39	69	59	36	20	15	1	116	92
Maine	24	12	11	1	3	2	0	36	76	79	35	18	14	3	116	96
Boston University	24	12	12	0	3	2	0	35	69	74	36	17	17	2	105	110
Northeastern	24	11	13	0	1	3	0	35	67	62	36	17	18	1	98	91
#15 Merrimack *	24	10	12	2	0	1	1	34	68	75	39	21	16	2	121	110
Massachusetts Lowell	24	9	15	0	1	2	0	28	66	80	35	13	22	0	91	114
New Hampshire	24	8	15	1	0	0	1	26	41	73	35	14	20	1	68	105
Vermont	24	8	15	1	0	0	0	25	55	83	35	13	21	1	73	115
Championship: March 21, 2026 † indicates regular season champion * indicates conference tournament champion (Lamoriello Trophy); Rankings: USCHO Division I Men's Poll; updated April 15, 2026

== Non-Conference record ==
=== Regular season record ===
Team	AHA	Big Ten	CCHA	ECAC Hockey	Independent	NCHC	Total
Boston College	0–0–0	2–0–1	1–0–0	2–1–0	0–0–0	0–2–0	5–3–1
Boston University	0–0–0	0–2–0	0–0–0	3–1–1	1–0–0	0–0–0	4–3–1
Connecticut	0–0–0	1–1–0	0–0–0	2–0–1	2–0–1	1–1–0	6–2–2
Maine	2–0–0	0–0–0	0–0–0	1–2–1	2–0–0	1–0–1	6–2–2
Massachusetts	1–1–0	0–0–0	2–0–0	1–1–0	1–0–0	1–1–0	6–3–0
Massachusetts Lowell	2–0–0	0–0–0	1–0–0	1–3–0	0–0–0	0–3–0	4–6–0
Merrimack	1–0–0	0–1–0	0–0–0	3–1–0	3–1–0	0–0–0	7–3–0
New Hampshire	1–0–0	1–1–0	0–0–0	3–3–0	1–0–0	0–0–0	6–4–0
Northeastern	1–2–0	0–0–0	0–0–0	1–1–0	2–0–0	1–0–0	5–3–0
Providence	0–0–0	0–2–0	1–0–1	2–0–0	1–1–0	1–1–0	5–4–1
Vermont	0–1–0	0–0–0	0–0–0	2–3–0	2–0–0	1–1–0	5–5–0
Overall	8–4–0	4–7–1	5–0–1	21–16–3	15–2–1	6–9–1	59–38–7

== Conference tournament ==
Note: Teams are reseeded after the Opening Round and Quarterfinals

Opening Round; March 11
11	Vermont	1
6	Boston University	4
10	New Hampshire	3
7	Northeastern	7
9	Massachusetts Lowell	3
8	Merrimack	5

Quarterfinals; March 13–14
5	Maine	0
4	Boston College	5
6	Boston University	3
3	Connecticut	5
7	Northeastern	1
2	Massachusetts	4
8	Merrimack	3*
1	Providence	2

Semifinals; March 20
3	Connecticut	4*
4	Boston College	3
2	Massachusetts	0
8	Merrimack	2

Championship; March 21
3	Connecticut	1
8	Merrimack	2

Note: * denotes overtime period(s)

== Ranking ==
=== USCHO ===
Team	Pre	1	2	3	4	5	6	7	8	9	10	11	13	14	15	16	17	18	19	20	21	22	23	24	25	Final
Boston College	6	11	9	9	11	18	18	15	15	15	13	12	13	13	12	15	13	11	14	12	10	13	17	17	19	–
Boston University	2	3	1	4	5	12	13	18	19	18	20	19	19	19	20	18	NR	NR	NR	NR	NR	NR	NR	NR	NR	–
Connecticut	10	13	12	11	9	11	14	11	12	14	12	11	11	10	11	13	12	12	11	10	13	14	14	13	13	–
Maine	7	6	7	10	12	6	8	10	10	11	15	14	15	12	16	17	17	18	NR	NR	20	18	NR	NR	NR	–
Massachusetts	15	14	11	13	13	13	12	17	18	NR	NR	NR	NR	NR	NR	NR	NR	19	19	19	19	17	15	14	15	–
Massachusetts Lowell	NR	NR	NR	NR	NR	NR	NR	NR	NR	NR	NR	NR	NR	NR	NR	NR	NR	NR	NR	NR	NR	NR	NR	NR	NR	–
Merrimack	NR	NR	NR	NR	NR	NR	NR	NR	NR	NR	NR	NR	NR	NR	NR	NR	NR	NR	NR	NR	NR	NR	NR	NR	16	–
New Hampshire	NR	NR	NR	NR	NR	NR	NR	NR	NR	NR	NR	NR	NR	NR	NR	NR	NR	NR	NR	NR	NR	NR	NR	NR	NR	–
Northeastern	NR	NR	NR	NR	NR	14	11	12	11	12	11	13	12	16	NR	NR	NR	NR	NR	NR	NR	NR	NR	NR	NR	–
Providence	9	7	14	15	16	15	15	16	16	16	16	16	16	18	14	11	9	7	7	7	6	5	5	7	7	–
Vermont	NR	NR	NR	NR	NR	NR	NR	NR	NR	NR	NR	NR	NR	NR	NR	NR	NR	NR	NR	NR	NR	NR	NR	NR	NR	–

Note: USCHO did not release a poll in week 12 or 26.

=== USA Hockey ===
Team	Pre	1	2	3	4	5	6	7	8	9	10	11	13	14	15	16	17	18	19	20	21	22	23	24	25	26	Final
Boston College	6	10	9	9	10	17	16	15	15	14	12	12	13	13	13	14	14	13	14	13	11	13	16	17	19	18	–
Boston University	2	3	1	4	5	13	12	19	20	18	20	19	19	NR	20	18	NR	NR	NR	NR	NR	NR	NR	NR	NR	NR	–
Connecticut	10	13	12	11	9	10	13	10	13	15	13	11	11	11	11	13	12	12	11	11	14	15	14	14	13	13	–
Maine	8	8	7	10	12	6	10	11	11	12	18	15	18	14	16	17	17	18	NR	NR	NR	18	NR	NR	NR	NR	–
Massachusetts	15	14	11	13	13	12	13	18	19	NR	NR	NR	NR	NR	NR	NR	NR	19	19	19	19	17	15	13	15	15	–
Massachusetts Lowell	NR	NR	NR	NR	NR	NR	NR	NR	NR	NR	NR	NR	NR	NR	NR	NR	NR	NR	NR	NR	NR	NR	NR	NR	NR	NR	–
Merrimack	NR	NR	NR	NR	NR	NR	NR	NR	NR	NR	NR	NR	NR	NR	NR	NR	NR	NR	NR	NR	NR	NR	NR	NR	16	16	–
New Hampshire	NR	NR	NR	NR	NR	NR	NR	NR	NR	NR	NR	20	20	NR	NR	NR	NR	NR	NR	NR	NR	NR	NR	NR	NR	NR	–
Northeastern	NR	NR	NR	NR	NR	14	11	12	12	11	11	13	12	15	NR	NR	NR	NR	NR	NR	NR	NR	NR	NR	NR	NR	–
Providence	8	6	13	14	15	15	15	16	17	17	17	16	15	17	14	11	9	7	6	7	6	5	5	7	7	9	–
Vermont	NR	NR	NR	NR	NR	NR	NR	NR	NR	NR	NR	NR	NR	NR	NR	NR	NR	NR	NR	NR	NR	NR	NR	NR	NR	NR	–

Note: USA Hockey did not release a poll in week 12.

=== NPI ===
Team	1	2	3	4	5	6	7	8	9	10	11	13	14	15	16	17	18	19	20	21	22	23	24	Final
Boston College	–	–	26	–	–	29	19	23	22	16	16	16	17	15	14	12	14	14	12	13	18	18	18	–
Boston University	–	–	22	–	–	34	32	35	27	33	23	23	26	16	22	24	24	29	28	24	24	29	29	–
Connecticut	–	–	17	–	–	39	16	24	25	20	18	15	18	19	15	16	13	12	14	15	16	15	16	–
Maine	–	–	24	–	–	25	34	28	28	40	34	22	29	26	23	22	23	26	22	18	20	22	24	–
Massachusetts	–	–	25	–	–	23	37	41	44	37	40	41	42	28	21	18	19	20	19	20	14	13	17	–
Massachusetts Lowell	–	–	43	–	–	48	54	54	50	53	52	50	46	49	48	50	49	45	47	48	45	46	47	–
Merrimack	–	–	23	–	–	46	44	40	43	50	43	40	30	40	31	28	26	24	30	30	28	24	22	–
New Hampshire	–	–	30	–	–	45	45	44	39	25	21	24	23	31	38	39	40	36	35	35	40	40	41	–
Northeastern	–	–	19	–	–	3	9	9	8	12	17	21	33	22	27	27	30	30	24	29	25	27	28	–
Providence	–	–	40	–	–	24	28	19	20	19	15	18	13	12	7	6	6	7	6	6	5	7	9	–
Vermont	–	–	47	–	–	56	50	52	52	48	50	51	50	46	50	48	46	50	51	52	51	52	52	–

Note: teams ranked in the top-10 automatically qualify for the NCAA tournament. Teams ranked 11-16 can qualify based upon conference tournament results.
