= Dean Letourneau =

Canadian ice hockey player (born 2006)

- Born: February 21, 2006 (age 20) Braeside, Ontario, Canada
- Height: 6 ft 7 in (201 cm)
- Weight: 210 lb (95 kg; 15 st 0 lb)
- Position: Centre
- Shoots: Right
- NCAA team: Boston College
- NHL draft: 25th overall, 2024; Boston Bruins

Dean Letourneau (born February 21, 2006) is a Canadian college ice hockey player who is a centre for Boston College of the National Collegiate Athletic Association (NCAA). He was selected 25th overall in the first round of the 2024 NHL entry draft by the Boston Bruins.

== Playing career ==
Although Letourneau was selected in the Ontario Hockey League draft, he elected instead to play at the prep school level. In the 2023–24 season, his second of two for St. Andrew's College, he scored 61 goals and a league-leading 127 points in 56 games at the U18 AAA level. He also appeared in two games for the Sioux Falls Stampede of the United States Hockey League. He intended to return to Sioux Falls at the conclusion of the season with St. Andrew's, but was sidelined by a shoulder separation in the final game of the season. Originally committed to play a full season with the Stampede before joining Boston College in the fall of 2025, he later changed his commitment to 2024 when a roster spot opened after Will Smith signed with the San Jose Sharks. In June 2024, Letourneau was selected 25th overall in the first round of the 2024 NHL entry draft by the Boston Bruins.

== Personal life ==
In addition to hockey, Letourneau played basketball and varsity lacrosse in high school.

== Career statistics ==
			Regular season					Playoffs
Season	Team	League	GP	G	A	Pts	PIM	GP	G	A	Pts	PIM
2022–23	St. Andrew's College	PHC	14	7	6	13	4	3	0	3	3	8
2023–24	St. Andrew's College	PHC	14	14	11	25	6	3	3	5	8	4
2023–24	Sioux Falls Stampede	USHL	2	0	0	0	2	—	—	—	—	—
2024–25	Boston College	HE	36	0	3	3	6	—	—	—	—	—
2025–26	Boston College	HE	36	22	17	39	22	—	—	—	—	—
NCAA totals			72	22	20	42	28	—	—	—	—	—

== Awards and honours ==
Award	Year	Ref
College
Hockey East Third All-Star Team	2026	
Hockey East All-Tournament Team	2026	

Awards and achievements
Preceded by Fabian Lysell	Boston Bruins first-round draft pick 2024	Succeeded by James Hagens
