= Toscano Family Ice Forum =

Ice hockey arena at the University of Connecticut

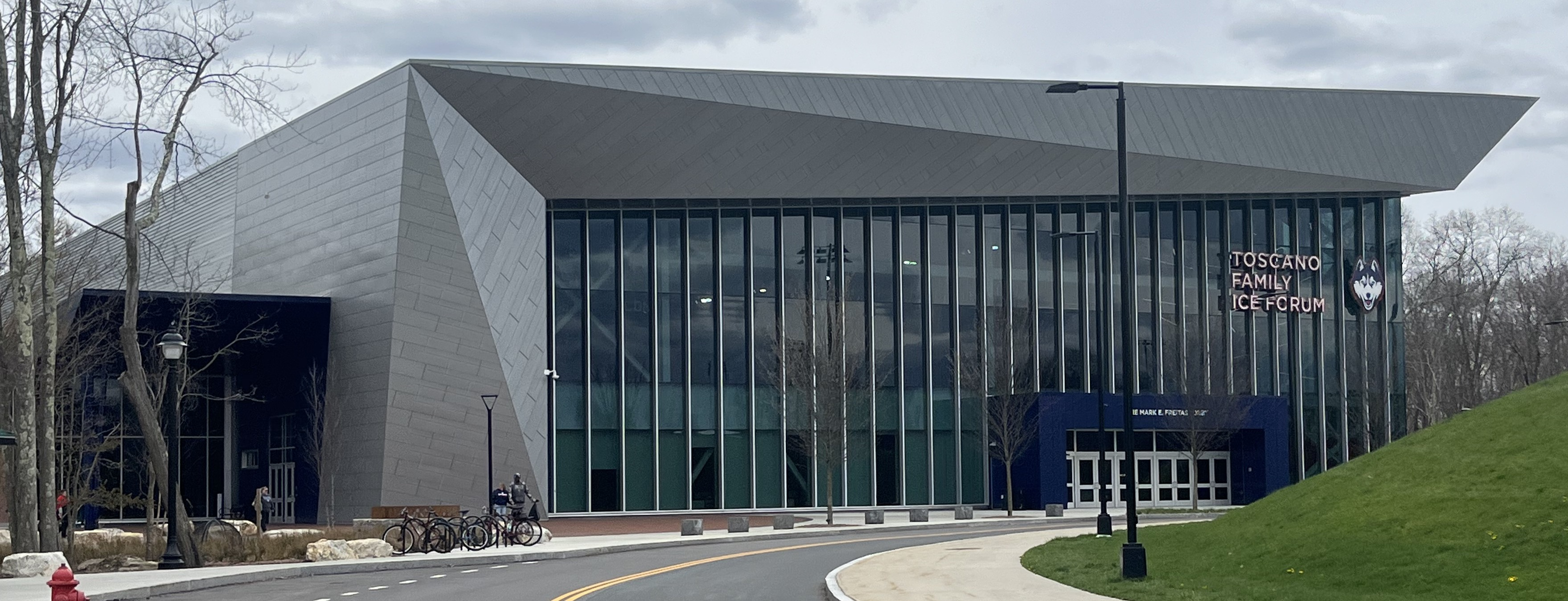
- Interactive map of Toscano Family Ice Forum
- Location: Jim Calhoun Way; Storrs, Connecticut, United States; 06269
- Coordinates: 41°48′00″N 72°15′21″W
- Owner: University of Connecticut
- Operator: University of Connecticut
- Capacity: 2,691
- Surface: 200' × 85' (hockey) [CONVERT]

Construction
- Groundbreaking: May 22, 2021; 5 years ago
- Cost: $70 million (estimate)
- Architect: JCJ Architecture www.jcj.com/

Tenants
- UConn Huskies men's ice hockey (2023–); UConn Huskies women's ice hockey (2023–)

The Toscano Family Ice Forum is an ice hockey arena on the main campus of the University of Connecticut in Storrs, Connecticut. The arena opened in January 2023 and has a capacity of 2,600 spectators.

== History ==
Despite being an NCAA Division I school, the UConn Huskies operated their ice hockey program at the Division III level for many years. During this time, the team's home rink was the UConn Ice Arena, an outdoor facility. The team was finally promoted to D-I in 1998 when the Mark Edward Freitas Ice Forum was completed. The Huskies used the Forum as their home for the next 18 years.

In 2014, UConn's men's hockey program joined Hockey East despite the Ice Forum not meeting the league's requirements. The Huskies used the larger PeoplesBank Arena in nearby Hartford, Connecticut as a stop-gap measure while they decided on a permanent, on-campus solution.

In 2021, the athletic department settled on building a new rink across from the Ice Forum which was scheduled to be completed in time for the start of the 2022–23 season. The arena hosted its first UConn women's hockey game on January 13, 2023 and its first UConn men's hockey game on January 14, 2023. Following the opening of the new on-campus rink, UConn announced that men's hockey would split its home schedule between Storrs and Hartford (similar to the men's and women's basketball programs). The women's team, which remained at Freitas Ice Forum as Hockey East has no minimum capacity requirement for women's hockey facilities, plays all home games at Toscano.
