= Schneider Arena =

Arena in Rhode Island

Coordinates: 41.846260°N 71.433632°W

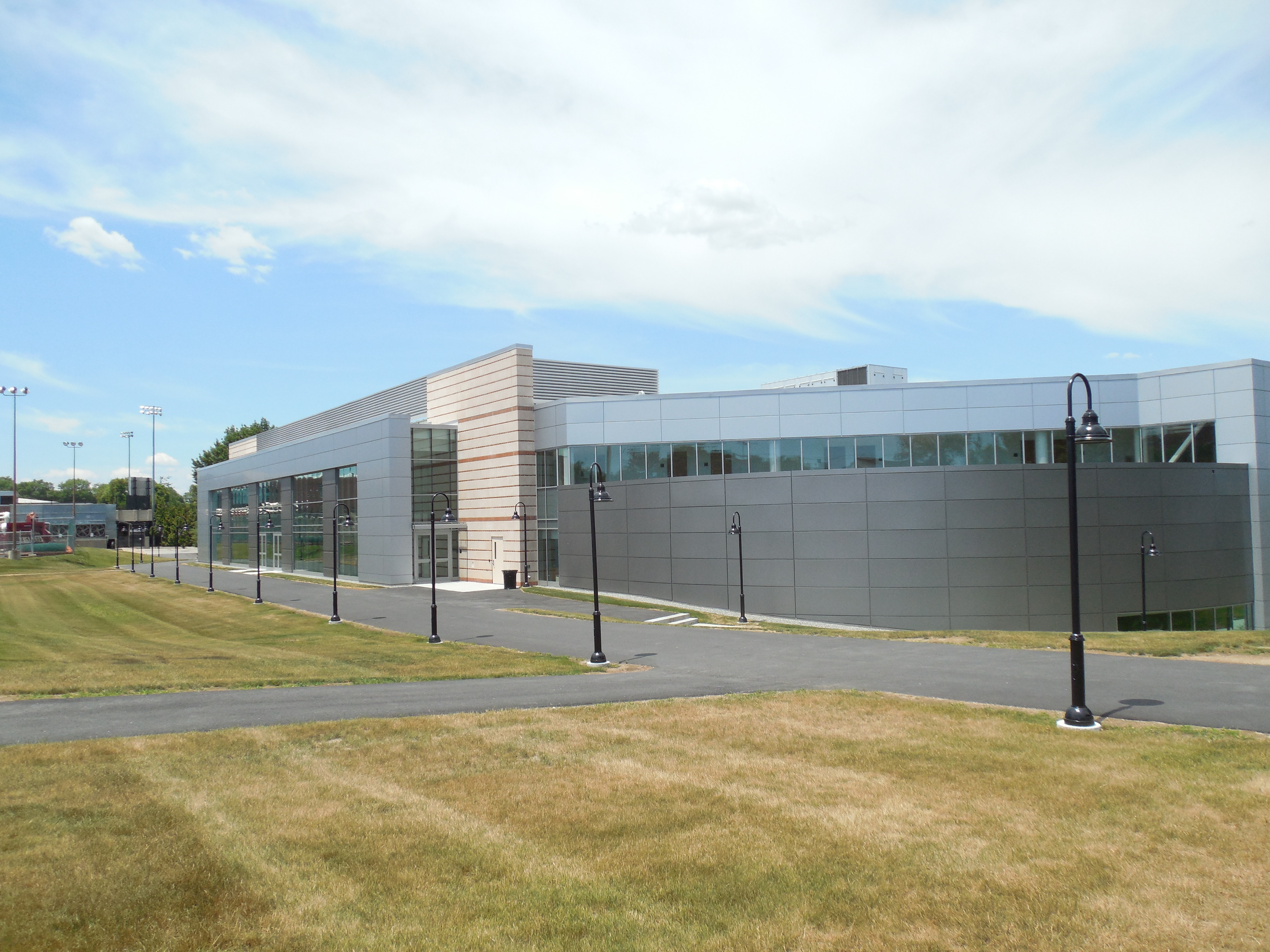
- Interactive map of Schneider Arena
- Location: Providence, Rhode Island
- Owner: Providence College Dept. of Athletics
- Capacity: 3,030 (hockey)
- Surface: 200 x 85 ft (hockey)

Construction
- Groundbreaking: 1973
- Opened: September 24, 1973
- Renovated: 2006, 2012–2013
- Cost: $1.8 million

Tenants
- Providence Friars men's and women's ice hockey

Schneider Arena is the on-campus ice rink and hockey arena at Providence College. It was named in honor of Herman D. Schneider, the founder of the hockey program and a longtime teacher at the school. It is located at the far northern end of campus, on the corner of Huxley Avenue and Admiral Street, and is notable for the reflective energy-conserving ceiling that was installed in 1992.

The arena is also used extensively by local hockey organizations and is the traditional site of the state high school ice hockey championships. It is also occasionally used for concerts, although most school-sponsored concerts are held in Alumni Hall. Due to its low ceiling, it has never been used for basketball.

== History ==
In 1999, the arena's scoreboard was replaced. The arena was intended to move the hockey team from its various off-campus arenas, such as the Rhode Island Auditorium, one year after the men's basketball team left its own on-campus arena, Alumni Hall, in favor of the larger, downtown Providence Civic Center.

On June 16, 2006, Providence College announced an anonymous donation of $340,000 made to be used for renovations to the arena. The original red and yellow seats, which checkerboard throughout the arena, were replaced with modern seats that are black and silver (black and white are the school colors, with silver being the current accent color). In addition, upgrades were made to the Friends of Friar room (behind the east end of the arena), a new training room, new office space, updated locker rooms, and updated concession areas.

Shortly after mid-October 2017, the American Hockey League farm team of the NHL's Boston Bruins, the Providence Bruins, announced that they had reached a partnership with Providence College's athletics department to use the Schneider Arena for P-Bruins team practices whenever their own home rink, the Amica Mutual Pavilion is unavailable for such use.
