= 2025–26 St. Lawrence Saints men's ice hockey season =

- Conference: ECAC Hockey
- Home ice: Appleton Arena

Record
- Overall: 7–24–3
- Conference: 6–15–1
- Home: 6–8–2
- Road: 1–14–1
- Neutral: 0–2–0

Coaches and captains
- Head coach: Brent Brekke
- Assistant coaches: Tommy Hill; Kyle Flanagan; Greg Gardner

The 2025–26 St. Lawrence Saints Men's ice hockey season will be the 85th season of play for the program and the 65th in ECAC Hockey. The Saints represented St. Lawrence University in the 2025–26 NCAA Division I men's ice hockey season, played their home games at the Appleton Arena and were coached by Brent Brekke in his 7th season.

== Departures ==
Player	Position	Nationality	Cause
Will Arquiett	Forward	United States	Graduation (retired)
Dominic Basse	Goaltender	United States	Graduation (retired)
Drake Burgin	Forward	Canada	Graduation (signed with Kansas City Mavericks)
Philippe Chapleau	Forward	United States	Graduation (signed with Étoile Noire de Strasbourg)
Reilly Connors	Forward	United States	Graduation (signed with Utah Grizzlies)
Fēlikss Gavars	Forward	Latvia	Transferred to Minnesota State
Greg Lapointe	Forward	Canada	Graduation (signed with Remparts de Tours)
Oak MacLeod	Forward	Canada	Graduation (retired)
Ty Naaykens	Forward	Canada	Graduation (retired)
Mason Waite	Defenseman	Canada	Graduation (retired)

== Recruiting ==
Player	Position	Nationality	Age	Notes
Jack Babbage	Defenseman	Canada	20	Oakville, ON; graduate transfer from New Hampshire
Andrew Brown	Defenseman	United States	24	Tully, NY
Frankie Carogioiello	Forward	Canada	23	Woodbridge, ON; transfer from Miami
Sam Frandina	Defenseman	United States	21	Hanover, NH
Filip Juříček	Forward	Czech Republic	20	Ostrava, CZE
Jakub Kopecký	Forward	Slovakia	21	Grand Rapids, MI
Sam LeDrew	Forward	United States	20	Stillwater Lake, NS
Teddy Mallgrave	Defenseman	United States	20	Summit, NJ
Cooper Pierson	Forward	United States	20	Zionsville, IN
Luke Santilli	Defenseman	United States	20	Reading, MA
Rasmus Svartström	Forward	Finland	19	Helsinki, FIN

== Roster ==
As of August 9, 2025.

No.	Nat.	Player	Class	Pos	Height	Weight	DoB	Hometown	Previous team	NHL rights
1	(United States)	Cameron Smith	Junior	G	6' 2" (1.88 m)	175 lb (79 kg)	2002-01-21	Eastchester, New York	P.A.L. Jr. Islanders (NCDC)	—
2	(United States)	Teddy Mallgrave	Freshman	D	6' 3" (1.91 m)	201 lb (91 kg)	2005-04-26	Summit, New Jersey	Waterloo Black Hawks (USHL)	—
3	(United States)	Evan Orloff	Sophomore	D	6' 3" (1.91 m)	194 lb (88 kg)	2003-03-09	Kensington, Maryland	Maine Nordiques (NAHL)	—
4	(United States)	Andrew Brown	Freshman	D	5' 11" (1.8 m)	187 lb (85 kg)	2005-07-01	Oakville, Ontario	Cape Breton Eagles (QMJHL)	—
7	(United States)	Sam Hall	Sophomore	D	6' 2" (1.88 m)	174 lb (79 kg)	2004-12-16	Far Hills, New Jersey	Okotoks Oilers (BCHL)	—
8	(Canada)	Sam LeDrew	Freshman	F	6' 1" (1.85 m)	181 lb (82 kg)	2005-03-19	Stillwater Lake, Nova Scotia	West Kelowna Warriors (BCHL)	—
9	(Czech Republic)	Filip Juříček	Freshman	F	5' 10" (1.78 m)	170 lb (77 kg)	2004-12-04	Ostrava, Czech Republic	Jokerit U20 (U20 SM-sarja)	—
11	(Finland)	Rasmus Svartström	Freshman	F	6' 5" (1.96 m)	201 lb (91 kg)	2005-11-24	Helsinki, Finland	Cranbrook Bucks (BCHL)	—
12	(Slovakia)	Jakub Kopecký	Freshman	F	6' 3" (1.91 m)	194 lb (88 kg)	2004-02-08	Grand Rapids, Michigan	Bismarck Bobcats (NAHL)	—
13	(United States)	Cooper Pierson	Freshman	F	5' 9" (1.75 m)	176 lb (80 kg)	2005-01-06	Zionsville, Indiana	Brooks Bandits (BCHL)	—
14	(United States)	Cayden Casey	Sophomore	F	6' 1" (1.85 m)	174 lb (79 kg)	2004-10-07	Elk River, Minnesota	Cedar Rapids RoughRiders (USHL)	—
15	(Canada)	Evan Mitchell	Junior	D	5' 11" (1.8 m)	185 lb (84 kg)	2002-02-13	Winnipeg, Manitoba	Cranbrook Bucks (BCHL)	—
16	(United States)	Sam Frandina	Freshman	D	5' 9" (1.75 m)	170 lb (77 kg)	2004-04-08	Hanover, New Hampshire	Coquitlam Express (BCHL)	—
17	(Sweden)	Gabe Westling	Sophomore	F	6' 4" (1.93 m)	203 lb (92 kg)	2003-10-18	Mora, Sweden	Nanaimo Clippers (BCHL)	—
18	(Canada)	Tyler Cristall	Senior	F	5' 9" (1.75 m)	170 lb (77 kg)	2002-05-13	Vancouver, British Columbia	West Kelowna Warriors (NAHL)	—
19	(United States)	Jacob Bernadet	Sophomore	F	5' 10" (1.78 m)	161 lb (73 kg)	2003-09-12	South Burlington, Vermont	Maine Nordiques (NAHL)	—
20	(Canada)	Frankie Carogioiello	Senior	F	5' 10" (1.78 m)	173 lb (78 kg)	2002-06-21	Woodbridge, Ontario	Miami (NCHC)	—
21	(Canada)	Isack Bandu	Senior	D	6' 2" (1.88 m)	195 lb (88 kg)	2001-05-03	Montreal, Quebec	Northern Michigan (CCHA)	—
22	(United States)	Luke Santilli	Freshman	F	6' 4" (1.93 m)	212 lb (96 kg)	2004-12-05	Reading, Massachusetts	Youngstown Phantoms (USHL)	—
23	(United States)	Jan Olenginski	Junior	F	5' 9" (1.75 m)	165 lb (75 kg)	2003-03-23	Philadelphia, Pennsylvania	Madison Capitols (USHL)	—
24	(Canada)	Spencer Bell	Sophomore	F	6' 0" (1.83 m)	190 lb (86 kg)	2003-10-04	Warman, Saskatchewan	Humboldt Broncos (SJHL)	—
25	(United States)	Jack Babbage	Graduate	D	6' 1" (1.85 m)	185 lb (84 kg)	2000-08-30	Tully, New York	New Hampshire (HEA)	—
26	(United States)	Jake Lammens	Junior	D	6' 1" (1.85 m)	185 lb (84 kg)	2002-10-03	Norwalk, Connecticut	Salmon Arm Silverbacks (BCHL)	—
27	(Canada)	Isaac Tremblay	Sophomore	F	6' 1" (1.85 m)	170 lb (77 kg)	2004-09-24	Granby, Quebec	Vernon Vipers (BCHL)	—
28	(Canada)	Nicholas Beneteau	Sophomore	F	6' 3" (1.91 m)	192 lb (87 kg)	2003-09-12	Windsor, Ontario	Alberni Valley Bulldogs (BCHL)	—
29	(United States)	Gunnar Thoreson	Junior	F	5' 10" (1.78 m)	185 lb (84 kg)	2002-03-19	Andover, Minnesota	Minnesota Wilderness (NAHL)	—
31	(United States)	Colin Winn	Freshman	G	6' 1" (1.85 m)	194 lb (88 kg)	2004-08-05	Westford, Massachusetts	Alberni Valley Bulldogs (BCHL)	—
32	(United States)	Mason Kucenski	Junior	G	6' 3" (1.91 m)	175 lb (79 kg)	2002-04-08	Gill, Massachusetts	Madison Capitols (USHL)	—
33	(United States)	Jack Wieneke	Sophomore	G	6' 1" (1.85 m)	185 lb (84 kg)	2003-03-08	Plymouth, Minnesota	Lone Star Brahmas (NAHL)	—
34	(Slovakia)	Ján Lašák	Senior	F	6' 1" (1.85 m)	200 lb (91 kg)	2002-08-11	Šurany, Slovakia	Janesville Jets (NAHL)	—

== Standings ==
2025–26 ECAC Hockey Standings
	Conference record										Overall record					
	GP	W	L	T	OTW	OTL	SW	PTS	GF	GA	GP	W	L	T	GF	GA
#8 Quinnipiac †	22	17	4	1	2	0	0	50	102	48	36	26	7	3	154	81
#12 Dartmouth	22	13	5	4	0	1	3	47	81	53	30	19	7	4	110	66
#9 Cornell	22	15	6	1	1	1	1	47	71	42	29	20	8	1	97	56
Princeton	22	11	9	2	0	1	1	37	63	57	30	15	12	3	89	82
Union	22	11	9	2	1	1	1	36	71	68	34	21	10	3	127	88
Harvard	22	11	10	1	0	1	0	35	61	64	30	14	14	2	83	87
Colgate	22	9	10	3	2	0	2	30	68	74	34	12	18	4	94	115
Clarkson	22	9	10	3	2	0	1	29	65	65	34	15	16	3	102	103
Rensselaer	22	8	13	1	0	1	0	26	55	70	34	11	22	1	79	113
Yale	22	7	14	1	2	2	0	22	63	80	30	8	21	1	77	112
St. Lawrence	22	6	15	1	0	0	1	20	59	99	34	7	24	3	82	147
Brown	22	4	16	2	0	2	1	17	44	83	30	5	23	2	63	110
Championship: March 21, 2025 † indicates conference regular season champion (Cleary Cup) * indicates conference tournament champion (Whitelaw Cup); Rankings: USCHO.com Top 20 Poll; updated March 2, 2026

== Schedule and results ==
Date	Time	Opponent^{#}	Rank^{#}	Site	TV	Decision	Result	Attendance	Record
Regular Season
October 4	6:00 pm	at Niagara*		Dwyer Arena • Lewiston, New York	FloHockey	Smith	L 2–5	982	0–1–0
October 5	5:00 pm	at Canisius*		LECOM Harborcenter • Buffalo, New York	FloHockey	Winn	L 2–4	89	0–2–0
October 10	7:05 pm	at Vermont*		Gutterson Fieldhouse • Burlington, Vermont	ESPN+	Kucenski	L 1–2	2,426	0–3–0
October 12	4:00 pm	Vermont*		Appleton Arena • Canton, New York	ESPN+	Kucenski	W 5–2	1,473	1–3–0
October 16	7:05 pm	at Notre Dame*		Compton Family Ice Arena • Notre Dame, Indiana	Peacock	Kucenski	L 2–8	4,366	1–4–0
October 17	7:05 pm	at Notre Dame*		Compton Family Ice Arena • Notre Dame, Indiana	Peacock	Kucenski	L 0–3	5,077	1–5–0
October 25	7:00 pm	Toronto*		Appleton Arena • Canton, New York (Exhibition)	ESPN+	Winn	W 3–2	756	
October 31	7:00 pm	Lake Superior State*		Appleton Arena • Canton, New York	ESPN+	Kucenski	T 3–3	510	1–5–1
November 1	7:00 pm	Michigan Tech*		Appleton Arena • Canton, New York	ESPN+	Kucenski	L 0–3	728	1–6–1
November 7	7:00 pm	at Rensselaer		Houston Field House • Troy, New York	ESPN+	Kucenski	W 4–3	1,308	2–6–1 (1–0–0)
November 8	7:00 pm	at Union		M&T Bank Center • Schenectady, New York	ESPN+	Kucenski	L 2–5	2,112	2–7–1 (1–1–0)
November 14	7:00 pm	#19 Dartmouth		Appleton Arena • Canton, New York	ESPN+	Kucenski	L 1–6	1,486	2–8–1 (1–2–0)
November 15	7:00 pm	Harvard		Appleton Arena • Canton, New York	ESPN+	Kucenski	L 3–4	1,663	2–9–1 (1–3–0)
November 21	7:00 pm	at Princeton		Hobey Baker Memorial Rink • Princeton, New Jersey	ESPN+	Kucenski	L 4–7	1,849	2–10–1 (1–4–0)
November 22	7:00 pm	at #9 Quinnipiac		M&T Bank Arena • Hamden, Connecticut	ESPN+	Winn	L 2–4	2,011	2–11–1 (1–5–0)
Adirondack Winter Invitational
November 28	4:00 pm	vs. Alaska*		Herb Brooks Arena • Lake Placid, New York (Adirondack Game 1)	ESPN+	Winn	L 0–2	1,067	2–12–1
November 29	4:00 pm	vs. Massachusetts Lowell*		Herb Brooks Arena • Lake Placid, New York (Adirondack Game 2)	ESPN+	Winn	L 3–7	1,385	2–13–1
December 5	7:00 pm	Colgate		Appleton Arena • Canton, New York	ESPN+	Kucenski	L 2–4	681	2–14–1 (1–6–0)
December 6	7:00 pm	#17 Cornell		Appleton Arena • Canton, New York	ESPN+, SNY	Winn	L 2–7	734	2–15–1 (1–7–0)
December 12	6:00 pm	USNTDP*		Appleton Arena • Canton, New York (Exhibition)	ESPN+	Smith	L 2–3	721	
January 2	7:00 pm	Stonehill*		Appleton Arena • Canton, New York	ESPN+	Kucenski	L 2–6	691	2–16–1
January 3	5:00 pm	Stonehill*		Appleton Arena • Canton, New York	ESPN+	Winn	T 3–3 ^{OT}	739	2–16–2
January 9	7:00 pm	at Yale		Ingalls Rink • New Haven, Connecticut	ESPN+	Kucenski	L 1–8	1,451	2–17–2 (1–8–0)
January 10	4:00 pm	at Brown		Meehan Auditorium • Providence, Rhode Island	ESPN+	Winn	L 1–4	628	2–18–2 (1–9–0)
January 16	7:00 pm	at Harvard		Bright-Landry Hockey Center • Boston, Massachusetts	ESPN+	Winn	L 1–5	1,626	2–19–2 (1–10–0)
January 17	7:00 pm	at #10 Dartmouth		Thompson Arena • Hanover, New Hampshire	ESPN+	Smith	L 0–4	2,736	2–20–2 (1–11–0)
January 23	7:00 pm	at Clarkson		Cheel Arena • Potsdam, New York (Rivalry)	ESPN+	Smith	T 5–5 ^{SOW}	3,226	2–20–3 (1–11–1)
January 24	7:00 pm	Clarkson		Appleton Arena • Canton, New York (Rivalry)	ESPN+	Smith	W 5–2	2,147	3–20–3 (2–11–1)
January 30	7:00 pm	#6 Quinnipiac		Appleton Arena • Canton, New York	ESPN+	Smith	L 0–7	656	3–21–3 (2–12–1)
January 31	7:00 pm	Princeton		Appleton Arena • Canton, New York	ESPN+	Smith	W 6–2	817	4–21–3 (3–12–1)
February 6	7:00 pm	Union		Appleton Arena • Canton, New York	ESPN+	Smith	L 1–4	637	4–22–3 (3–13–1)
February 7	7:00 pm	Rensselaer		Appleton Arena • Canton, New York	ESPN+	Smith	W 7–3	853	5–22–3 (4–13–1)
February 20	7:00 pm	Brown		Appleton Arena • Canton, New York	ESPN+	Smith	W 3–1	517	6–22–3 (5–13–1)
February 21	7:00 pm	Yale		Appleton Arena • Canton, New York	ESPN+	Smith	W 5–2	973	7–22–3 (6–13–1)
February 27	7:00 pm	at #11 Cornell		Lynah Rink • Ithaca, New York	ESPN+	Smith	L 1–5	3,762	7–23–3 (6–14–1)
February 28	7:00 pm	at Colgate		Class of 1965 Arena • Hamilton, New York	ESPN+	Smith	L 3–7	1,028	7–24–3 (6–15–1)
ECAC Hockey Tournament
March 6	7:00 pm	at Harvard*		Bright-Landry Hockey Center • Boston, Massachusetts (ECAC First Round)	ESPN+	Smith	L 3–4	809	7–25–3
*Non-conference game. ^{#}Rankings from USCHO.com Poll. All times are in Eastern Time. Source:

== Rankings ==
Poll	Week																											
Poll	Pre	1	2	3	4	5	6	7	8	9	10	11	12	13	14	15	16	17	18	19	20	21	22	23	24	25	26	27 (Final)
USCHO.com	NR	NR	NR	NR	NR	NR	NR	NR	NR	NR	NR	NR	–															
USA Hockey	NR	NR	NR	NR	NR	NR	NR	NR	NR	NR	NR	NR	–															

Note: USCHO did not release a poll in week 12.
Note: USA Hockey did not release a poll in week 12.
