= 2025–26 New Hampshire Wildcats men's ice hockey season =

- Conference: Hockey East
- Home ice: Whittemore Center

Record
- Overall: 14–19–1
- Conference: 8–15–1
- Home: 6–10–1
- Road: 8–9–0

Coaches and captains
- Head coach: Mike Souza
- Assistant coaches: Glenn Stewart; Jeff Giuliano; Sean Maguire
- Captain: Morgan Winters
- Alternate captain(s): Marty Laviņš; Cy LeClerc; J.P. Turner

The 2025–26 New Hampshire Wildcats Men's ice hockey season will be the 100th season of play for the program and the 42nd in Hockey East. The Wildcats will represent the University of New Hampshire in the 2025–26 NCAA Division I men's ice hockey season, play their home games at the Whittemore Center and be coached by Mike Souza in his 8th season.

== Departures ==
Player	Position	Nationality	Cause
Jack Babbage	Defenseman	United States	Transferred to St. Lawrence
Ryan Conmy	Forward	United States	Transferred to Boston College
Robert Cronin	Forward	United States	Graduation (signed with Maine Mariners)
Liam Devlin	Forward	United States	Graduation (signed with Orlando Solar Bears)
Rico DiMatteo	Goaltender	United States	Graduation (retired)
Alex Gagne	Defenseman	United States	Graduation (signed with Colorado Avalanche)
Rafe Gaughan	Goaltender	United States	Graduation (retired)
Colton Huard	Defenseman	United States	Graduation (signed with Charlotte Checkers)
Nikolai Jenson	Defenseman	United States	Graduation (retired)
Luis Lindner	Defenseman/Forward	Austria	Graduation (signed with Steinbach Black Wings Linz)
Conor Lovett	Forward	United States	Left program (retired)
Connor MacPherson	Forward	Canada	Returned to juniors (Halifax Mooseheads)
Luke Reid	Defenseman	Canada	Graduation (signed with Adirondack Thunder)
Connor Sweeney	Forward	United States	Graduation (signed with Dogs de Cholet)

== Recruiting ==
Player	Position	Nationality	Age	Notes
Alex Carr	Defenseman	Canada	21	Middle Sackville, NS
Kyle Chauvette	Goaltender	United States	23	Goffstown, NH; transfer from Union
Reid Conn	Defenseman	United States	21	Windsor, ON
Kristian Coombs	Goaltender	Canada	20	Calgary, AB
Jack Cronin	Forward	United States	24	Hamilton, MA; graduate transfer from Princeton
Nick De Angelis	Defenseman	Canada	21	King City, ON
Conner de Haro	Defenseman	United States	19	Raleigh, NC
Connor DeTurris	Forward	United States	20	Naperville, IL
Félix Gagnon	Forward	Canada	21	Saguenay, QC
Cam MacDonald	Forward	Canada	22	Toronto, ON; transfer from Acadia; selected 160th overall in 2021
Jacob Newcombe	Forward	Canada	21	Halifax, NS
Sam Oliver	Forward	Canada	21	Quispamsis, NB
Ryan Philbrick	Defenseman	United States	21	Concord, NH
Oscar Plandowski	Defenseman	Canada	22	Red Deer, AB; transfer from New Brunswick; selected 155th overall in 2021

== Roster ==
As of August 14, 2025.

No.	Nat.	Player	Class	Pos	Height	Weight	DoB	Hometown	Previous team	NHL rights
1	(Canada)	Kristian Coombs	Freshman	G	6' 2" (1.88 m)	185 lb (84 kg)	2005-06-25	Calgary, Alberta	Melfort Mustangs (SJHL)	—
2	(Canada)	Alex Carr	Freshman	D	6' 0" (1.83 m)	194 lb (88 kg)	2004-03-20	Middle Sackville, Nova Scotia	Rouyn-Noranda Huskies (QMJHL)	—
4	(United States)	Ryan Philbrick	Freshman	D	5' 11" (1.8 m)	181 lb (82 kg)	2004-07-20	Concord, New Hampshire	Salmon Arm Silverbacks (BCHL)	—
5	(United States)	Zach Hahn	Junior	D	6' 2" (1.88 m)	205 lb (93 kg)	2002-08-06	Huntington, New York	P.A.L. Jr. Islanders (NCDC)	—
6	(Latvia)	Marty Laviņš (A)	Junior	F	6' 1" (1.85 m)	185 lb (84 kg)	2003-04-10	Riga, Latvia	Cedar Rapids RoughRiders (USHL)	—
7	(Canada)	Ryan MacPherson	Sophomore	F	6' 1" (1.85 m)	185 lb (84 kg)	2005-03-02	Windsor, Ontario	Penticton Vees (BCHL)	PHI, 172nd overall 2023
8	(United States)	Reid Conn	Freshman	D	6' 4" (1.93 m)	209 lb (95 kg)	2004-02-04	Centennial, Colorado	Chicago Steel (USHL)	—
9	(United States)	Jack Cronin	Graduate	F	5' 11" (1.8 m)	185 lb (84 kg)	2001-03-31	South Hamilton, Massachusetts	Princeton (ECAC)	—
10	(United States)	Ronan Walsh	Junior	F	6' 4" (1.93 m)	210 lb (95 kg)	2002-05-03	Andover, New Hampshire	Amarillo Wranglers (NAHL)	—
11	(United States)	Connor DeTurris	Freshman	F	6' 1" (1.85 m)	185 lb (84 kg)	2004-10-08	Naperville, Illinois	Nanaimo Clippers (BCHL)	—
13	(United States)	Josh Player	Sophomore	D	6' 0" (1.83 m)	190 lb (86 kg)	2005-05-13	Thorofare, New Jersey	Green Bay Gamblers (USHL)	—
15	(Canada)	Oscar Plandowski	Sophomore	D	6' 0" (1.83 m)	190 lb (86 kg)	2003-05-18	Red Deer, Alberta	New Brunswick (AUS)	DET, 155th overall 2021
16	(United States)	J. P. Turner (A)	Junior	F	6' 0" (1.83 m)	195 lb (88 kg)	2003-01-31	East Falmouth, Massachusetts	Fargo Force (USHL)	—
17	(Latvia)	Kristaps Skrastiņš	Senior	F	5' 10" (1.78 m)	180 lb (82 kg)	2001-11-20	Grobiņa, Latvia	Amarillo Wranglers (NAHL)	—
19	(United States)	Brendan Fitzgerald	Junior	D	6' 0" (1.83 m)	165 lb (75 kg)	2003-03-06	North Reading, Massachusetts	Cedar Rapids RoughRiders (USHL)	—
22	(Canada)	Félix Gagnon	Freshman	F	6' 0" (1.83 m)	174 lb (79 kg)	2004-06-10	Saguenay, Quebec	Chicoutimi Saguenéens (QMJHL)	—
23	(United States)	Jason Siedem	Junior	F	5' 10" (1.78 m)	185 lb (84 kg)	2002-10-17	Madison, New Jersey	Blackfalds Bulldogs (AJHL)	—
26	(United States)	Morgan Winters (C)	Senior	F	5' 11" (1.8 m)	165 lb (75 kg)	2001-12-08	Osprey, Florida	Omaha Lancers (USHL)	—
29	(United States)	Cy LeClerc (A)	Senior	F	5' 9" (1.75 m)	180 lb (82 kg)	2002-08-17	Brentwood, New Hampshire	Janesville Jets (NAHL)	—
36	(United States)	Kyle Chauvette	Senior	G	6' 1" (1.85 m)	170 lb (77 kg)	2001-10-05	Goffstown, New Hampshire	Union (ECAC)	—
37	(United States)	Nick Ring	Junior	F	5' 10" (1.78 m)	180 lb (82 kg)	2003-10-26	Abington, Massachusetts	Sioux Falls Stampede (USHL)	—
41	(Canada)	Jared Whale	Senior	G	5' 11" (1.8 m)	195 lb (88 kg)	2002-11-01	Calgary, Alberta	Alaska Anchorage (NCAA)	—
47	(Canada)	Sam Oliver	Freshman	F	5' 11" (1.8 m)	183 lb (83 kg)	2004-07-04	Quispamsis, New Brunswick	Drummondville Voltigeurs (QMJHL)	—
61	(Canada)	Cam MacDonald	Sophomore	F	6' 2" (1.88 m)	194 lb (88 kg)	2003-05-04	Toronto, Ontario	Acadia (AUS)	TBL, 160th overall 2021
72	(United States)	Conner de Haro	Freshman	D	5' 11" (1.8 m)	192 lb (87 kg)	2005-10-17	Raleigh, North Carolina	Youngstown Phantoms (USHL)	—
91	(Canada)	Jacob Newcombe	Freshman	F	6' 0" (1.83 m)	203 lb (92 kg)	2004-04-27	Halifax, Nova Scotia	Cape Breton Eagles (QMJHL)	—
95	(Canada)	Nick De Angelis	Freshman	D	6' 2" (1.88 m)	187 lb (85 kg)	2004-05-22	King City, Ontario	Sudbury Wolves (OHL)	—

== Standings ==
2025–26 Hockey East Standings
	Conference record										Overall record					
	GP	W	L	T	OTW	OTL	SW	PTS	GF	GA	GP	W	L	T	GF	GA
#9 Providence †	24	18	5	1	2	1	0	54	86	46	36	23	11	2	120	82
#16 Massachusetts	24	14	9	1	2	1	1	43	63	53	36	22	13	1	101	83
#13 Connecticut	24	12	9	3	1	1	2	41	73	59	38	20	13	5	116	90
#19 Boston College	24	13	11	0	1	1	2	39	69	59	36	20	15	1	116	92
Maine	24	12	11	1	3	2	0	36	76	79	35	18	14	3	116	96
Boston University	24	12	12	0	3	2	0	35	69	74	36	17	17	2	105	110
Northeastern	24	11	13	0	1	3	0	35	67	62	36	17	18	1	98	91
#15 Merrimack *	24	10	12	2	0	1	1	34	68	75	39	21	16	2	121	110
Massachusetts Lowell	24	9	15	0	1	2	0	28	66	80	35	13	22	0	91	114
New Hampshire	24	8	15	1	0	0	1	26	41	73	35	14	20	1	68	105
Vermont	24	8	15	1	0	0	0	25	55	83	35	13	21	1	73	115
Championship: March 21, 2026 † indicates regular season champion * indicates conference tournament champion (Lamoriello Trophy); Rankings: USCHO Division I Men's Poll; updated April 15, 2026

== Schedule and results ==
Date	Time	Opponent^{#}	Rank^{#}	Site	TV	Decision	Result	Attendance	Record
Exhibition
October 3	7:00 pm	vs. #7 Maine*		Sidney J. Watson Arena • Brunswick, Maine (Exhibition, Rivalry)		Chauvette	T 2–2 ^{OT}	2,000	
Regular Season
October 9	7:00 pm	at #2 Michigan State*		Munn Ice Arena • East Lansing, Michigan	BTN+	Chauvette	W 4–3	6,555	1–0–0
October 10	7:30 pm	at #2 Michigan State*		Munn Ice Arena • East Lansing, Michigan	BTN+	Chauvette	L 0–2	6,555	1–1–0
October 18	6:00 pm	at Merrimack		J. Thom Lawler Rink • North Andover, Massachusetts	ESPN+	Chauvette	L 1–5	2,411	1–2–0 (0–1–0)
October 24	7:00 pm	Long Island*		Whittemore Center • Durham, New Hampshire	ESPN+	Chauvette	W 3–2 ^{OT}	5,234	2–2–0
October 25	7:00 pm	#6 Quinnipiac*		Whittemore Center • Durham, New Hampshire	ESPN+, NESN	Chauvette	L 0–2	6,501	2–3–0
October 31	7:00 pm	Vermont		Whittemore Center • Durham, New Hampshire	ESPN+	Chauvette	W 4–2	3,495	3–3–0 (1–1–0)
November 1	7:00 pm	Vermont		Whittemore Center • Durham, New Hampshire	ESPN+	Chauvette	L 1–2	4,013	3–4–0 (1–2–0)
November 7	7:15 pm	at Massachusetts Lowell		Tsongas Center • Lowell, Massachusetts	ESPN+	Chauvette	W 2–0	6,008	4–4–0 (2–2–0)
November 8	7:00 pm	Massachusetts Lowell		Whittemore Center • Durham, New Hampshire	ESPN+	Chauvette	L 1–6	4,771	4–5–0 (2–3–0)
November 14	7:00 pm	at Rensselaer*		Houston Field House • Troy, New York	ESPN+	Chauvette	W 6–3	1,788	5–5–0
November 15	5:00 pm	at Union*		M&T Bank Center • Schenectady, New York	ESPN+	Chauvette	L 0–6	2,264	5–6–0
November 21	7:00 pm	#11 Connecticut		Whittemore Center • Durham, New Hampshire	ESPN+	Chauvette	L 1–4	5,688	5–7–0 (2–4–0)
November 22	6:30 pm	at #11 Connecticut		Toscano Family Ice Forum • Storrs, Connecticut	ESPN+	Whale	W 4–3	2,248	6–7–0 (3–4–0)
November 29	5:00 pm	at Bentley*		Bentley Arena • Waltham, Massachusetts	FloHockey	Chauvette	W 3–0	1,589	7–7–0
December 5	7:00 pm	at #11 Maine		Alfond Arena • Orono, Maine (Rivalry)	ESPN+, NESN	Chauvette	W 1–0	4,980	8–7–0 (4–4–0)
December 6	7:00 pm	at #11 Maine		Alfond Arena • Orono, Maine (Rivalry)	ESPN+	Chauvette	W 3–2	4,980	9–7–0 (5–4–0)
December 14	4:00 pm	#8 Dartmouth*		Whittemore Center • Durham, New Hampshire (Rivalry)	ESPN+	Chauvette	W 3–2 ^{OT}	5,469	10–7–0
January 3	7:00 pm	Colgate*		Whittemore Center • Durham, New Hampshire	ESPN+	Chauvette	L 2–3	4,739	10–8–0
January 4	4:00 pm	Colgate*		Whittemore Center • Durham, New Hampshire	ESPN+	Chauvette	W 3–2	2,918	11–8–0
January 16	7:00 pm	Northeastern		Whittemore Center • Durham, New Hampshire	ESPN+, NESN	Chauvette	L 0–4	4,479	11–9–0 (5–5–0)
January 18	4:00 pm	at Northeastern		Walter Brown Arena • Boston, Massachusetts	ESPN+	Whale	L 2–5	225	11–10–0 (5–6–0)
January 23	7:00 pm	at #15 Boston College		Conte Forum • Chestnut Hill, Massachusetts	ESPN+	Chauvette	L 2–5	7,491	11–11–0 (5–7–0)
January 24	7:00 pm	#15 Boston College		Whittemore Center • Durham, New Hampshire	ESPN+	Chauvette	L 0–3	6,501	11–12–0 (5–8–0)
January 30	7:00 pm	at Merrimack		J. Thom Lawler Rink • North Andover, Massachusetts	ESPN+	Chauvette	L 1–2	2,647	11–13–0 (5–9–0)
January 31	7:00 pm	Merrimack		Whittemore Center • Durham, New Hampshire	ESPN+	Chauvette	T 3–3 ^{SOW}	5,129	11–13–1 (5–9–1)
February 6	7:00 pm	#7 Providence		Whittemore Center • Durham, New Hampshire	ESPN+	Chauvette	L 1–6	4,594	11–14–1 (5–10–1)
February 13	7:00 pm	Boston University		Whittemore Center • Durham, New Hampshire	ESPN+	Chauvette	W 4–1	5,877	12–14–1 (6–10–1)
February 14	6:00 pm	at Boston University		Agganis Arena • Boston, Massachusetts	ESPN+	Chauvette	L 3–5	4,516	12–15–1 (6–11–1)
February 20	7:00 pm	at #19 Massachusetts		Mullins Center • Amherst, Massachusetts	ESPN+	Chauvette	L 0–4	7,216	12–16–1 (6–12–1)
February 21	7:00 pm	#19 Massachusetts		Whittemore Center • Durham, New Hampshire	ESPN+, NESN	Chauvette	W 1–0	5,269	13–16–1 (7–12–1)
February 27	7:00 pm	at #6 Providence		Schneider Arena • Providence, Rhode Island	ESPN+	Chauvette	W 1–0	3,046	14–16–1 (8–12–1)
February 28	7:00 pm	#6 Providence		Whittemore Center • Durham, New Hampshire	ESPN+	Chauvette	L 2–3	4,854	14–17–1 (8–13–1)
March 5	7:00 pm	at #14 Connecticut		Toscano Family Ice Forum • Storrs, Connecticut	ESPN+	Chauvette	L 1–4	2,513	14–18–1 (8–14–1)
March 7	7:00 pm	#17 Massachusetts		Whittemore Center • Durham, New Hampshire	ESPN+	Chauvette	L 2–4	6,227	14–19–1 (8–15–1)
Hockey East Tournament
March 11	7:00 pm	vs. Northeastern*		Conte Forum • Chestnut Hill, Massachusetts (Hockey East Opening Round)	ESPN+, NESN	Chauvette	L 3–7	452	14–20–1
*Non-conference game. ^{#}Rankings from USCHO.com Poll. All times are in Eastern Time. Source:

== Rankings ==
Poll	Week																											
Poll	Pre	1	2	3	4	5	6	7	8	9	10	11	12	13	14	15	16	17	18	19	20	21	22	23	24	25	26	27 (Final)
USCHO.com	NR	NR	RV	NR	NR	NR	NR	NR	NR	NR	RV	RV	–	RV	RV	RV	RV											
USA Hockey	NR	NR	RV	NR	NR	NR	NR	NR	NR	NR	RV	20т	–	20	RV	RV	NR											

Note: USCHO did not release a poll in week 12.
Note: USA Hockey did not release a poll in week 12.
