= 2025–26 UMass Lowell River Hawks men's ice hockey season =

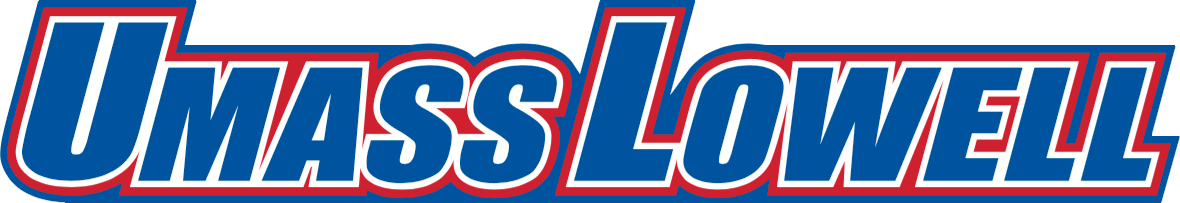
- Conference: Hockey East
- Home ice: Tsongas Center

Record
- Overall: 10–18–0
- Conference: 6–12–0
- Home: 3–9–0
- Road: 5–7–0
- Neutral: 2–2–0

Coaches and captains
- Head coach: Norm Bazin
- Assistant coaches: Andy Boschetto; Eric Sorenson; Dan Darrow
- Captain: Jason Ahearn
- Alternate captain(s): Dillan Bentley; T.J. Schweighardt; Jak Vaarwerk

The 2025–26 UMass Lowell River Hawks Men's ice hockey season will be the 59th season of play for the program, the 43rd at the Division I level and 42nd in Hockey East. The River Hawks will represent the University of Massachusetts Lowell in the 2025–26 NCAA Division I men's ice hockey season, play their home games at Tsongas Center and be coached by Norm Bazin in his 15th season.

== Departures ==
Player	Position	Nationality	Cause
Nick Anderson	Defenseman	United States	Graduation (signed with Orlando Solar Bears)
Mitchell Becker	Defenseman	United States	Transferred to Niagara
Pierson Brandon	Defenseman	United States	Graduation (signed with Adirondack Thunder)
Tate Brandon	Goaltender	United States	Graduation (retired)
Ian Carpentier	Forward	United States	Graduation (retired)
Owen Cole	Forward	Canada	Graduation (signed with Kansas City Mavericks)
Dylan Cook	Forward	United States	Transferred to Bentley
Matt Crasa	Forward	United States	Graduation (signed with Norfolk Admirals)
Béni Halász	Goaltender	Hungary	Left program
Isac Jonsson	Defenseman	Sweden	Graduation (signed with Kansas City Mavericks)
Ben Meehan	Defenseman	United States	Graduation (signed with Iowa Wild)
Edvard Nordlund	Goaltender	Sweden	Graduation (retired)
Stefan Owens	Forward	United States	Graduation (retired)
Jack Robilotti	Defenseman	United States	Graduation (signed with Bloomington Bison)
Ģirts Silkalns	Forward	Latvia	Transferred to Northern Michigan
Roc Truman	Forward	Canada	Left program (retired)
Scout Truman	Forward	Canada	Transferred to Minnesota Duluth
Henry Welsch	Goaltender	United States	Graduation (signed with Adirondack Thunder)

== Recruiting ==
Player	Position	Nationality	Age	Notes
David Adaszynski	Forward	Canada	20	Burnaby, BC
Jay Ahearn	Forward	United States	24	Staten Island, NY; transfer from Niagara
Diego Buttazzoni	Forward	Canada	19	Langley, BC
August Classon	Defenseman	Sweden	21	Stockholm, SWE
Austin Elliott	Goaltender	Canada	21	Strathmore, AB
Nico Goich	Goaltender	United States	21	Homer Glen, IL
James Johnson	Defenseman	Canada	21	Ajax, ON
Cole Lonsdale	Forward	Canada	21	Mississauga, ON
Tnias Mathurin	Defenseman	Canada	21	Ajax, ON; selected 137th overall in 2022
Nate Misskey	Defenseman	Canada	20	Melfort, SK; selected 143rd overall in 2024
Josh Mori	Defenseman	Canada	21	Richmond, BC
Dominic Payne	Defenseman	Canada	20	North Vancouver, BC; transfer from Canisius
Samuel Richard	Goaltender	Canada	24	Sainte-Catherine, QC; transfer from New Brunswick
Luke Shipley	Defenseman	Canada	21	Powell River, BC
Dalyn Wakely	Forward	Canada	21	Port Hope, ON; selected 192nd overall in 2024

== Roster ==
As of September 14, 2025.

No.	Nat.	Player	Class	Pos	Height	Weight	DoB	Hometown	Previous team	NHL rights
2	(United States)	Daniel Buchbinder	Sophomore	D	6' 3" (1.91 m)	190 lb (86 kg)	2004-07-07	Buffalo, New York	Penticton Vees (BCHL)	—
3	(United States)	Dominick Rivelli	Sophomore	F	5' 10" (1.78 m)	176 lb (80 kg)	2003-08-01	Highland Park, Illinois	New Jersey Titans (NAHL)	—
4	(United States)	T. J. Schweighardt (A)	Senior	D	5' 10" (1.78 m)	180 lb (82 kg)	2001-03-15	Wayne, New Jersey	Youngstown Phantoms (USHL)	—
5	(United States)	Jay Ahearn (C)	Senior	F	5' 11" (1.8 m)	170 lb (77 kg)	2001-05-23	Staten Island, New York	Niagara (NAHL)	—
6	(Canada)	James Johnson	Freshman	D	6' 6" (1.98 m)	203 lb (92 kg)	2004-04-16	Ajax, Ontario	Nanaimo Clippers (BCHL)	—
7	(Canada)	Cole Lonsdale	Freshman	F	5' 11" (1.8 m)	170 lb (77 kg)	2004-05-30	Mississauga, Ontario	Nanaimo Clippers (BCHL)	—
8	(United States)	Jaiden Moriello	Junior	F	6' 2" (1.88 m)	190 lb (86 kg)	2003-05-04	Saugus, Massachusetts	West Kelowna Warriors (BCHL)	—
9	(United States)	Jack Collins	Senior	F	6' 4" (1.93 m)	215 lb (98 kg)	2001-11-13	Canton, New York	Lone Star Brahmas (NAHL)	—
10	(United States)	Chris Delaney	Sophomore	F	5' 6" (1.68 m)	146 lb (66 kg)	2004-09-25	Hopkinton, Massachusetts	Madison Capitols (USHL)	—
11	(Canada)	Tnias Mathurin	Freshman	D	6' 3" (1.91 m)	201 lb (91 kg)	2004-01-15	Ajax, Ontario	Windsor Spitfires (OHL)	DET, 137th overall 2022
12	(Canada)	Luke Shipley	Freshman	D	6' 0" (1.83 m)	187 lb (85 kg)	2004-08-08	Powell River, British Columbia	Brandon Wheat Kings (WHL)	—
13	(Canada)	Nate Misskey	Freshman	D	6' 4" (1.93 m)	212 lb (96 kg)	2005-01-12	Melfort, Saskatchewan	Victoria Royals (WHL)	SJS, 143rd overall 2024
14	(Canada)	Dalyn Wakely	Freshman	F	6' 1" (1.85 m)	198 lb (90 kg)	2004-03-05	Port Hope, Ontario	Barrie Colts (OHL)	EDM, 192nd overall 2024
15	(Canada)	David Adaszynski	Freshman	F	5' 11" (1.8 m)	196 lb (89 kg)	2005-05-25	Burnaby, British Columbia	Calgary Hitmen (WHL)	—
17	(Canada)	Mirko Buttazoni	Sophomore	F	5' 10" (1.78 m)	190 lb (86 kg)	2004-09-12	Langley, British Columbia	Brooks Bandits (BCHL)	—
18	(United States)	Sean Kilcullen	Junior	D	6' 0" (1.83 m)	190 lb (86 kg)	2002-08-03	Kensington, Maryland	Maryland Black Bears (NAHL)	—
19	(United States)	Dillan Bentley (A)	Senior	F	6' 4" (1.93 m)	190 lb (86 kg)	2001-03-31	Peoria, Illinois	New Mexico Ice Wolves (NAHL)	—
20	(Slovakia)	Libor Nemec	Sophomore	F	6' 2" (1.88 m)	187 lb (85 kg)	2003-09-03	Bardejov, Slovakia	Green Bay Gamblers (USHL)	—
21	(Canada)	Connor Eddy	Senior	F	6' 1" (1.85 m)	200 lb (91 kg)	2002-04-18	Victoria, British Columbia	Northern Michigan (CCHA)	—
22	(Canada)	Josh Mori	Freshman	D	5' 11" (1.8 m)	174 lb (79 kg)	2004-03-27	Richmond, British Columbia	Edmonton Oil Kings (WHL)	—
23	(Canada)	Lee Parks	Sophomore	F	6' 2" (1.88 m)	218 lb (99 kg)	2004-10-16	Stittsville, Ontario	Fargo Force (USHL)	—
26	(United States)	Jacob MacDonald	Sophomore	F	6' 2" (1.88 m)	190 lb (86 kg)	2004-09-23	Fort Worth, Texas	Lone Star Brahmas (NAHL)	—
27	(Canada)	Dominic Payne	Sophomore	D	6' 1" (1.85 m)	176 lb (80 kg)	2004-12-08	North Vancouver, British Columbia	Canisius (AHA)	—
29	(United States)	Jak Vaarwerk (A)	Junior	F	6' 0" (1.83 m)	181 lb (82 kg)	2003-06-13	East Amherst, New York	Des Moines Buccaneers (USHL)	—
30	(United States)	Niko Goich	Freshman	G	6' 4" (1.93 m)	174 lb (79 kg)	2004-03-24	Homer Glen, Illinois	Shreveport Mudbugs (NAHL)	—
31	(Canada)	Austin Elliott	Freshman	G	6' 2" (1.88 m)	185 lb (84 kg)	2004-05-14	Strathmore, Alberta	London Knights (OHL)	—
33	(Canada)	Samuel Richard	Senior	G	6' 0" (1.83 m)	170 lb (77 kg)	2001-03-12	Sainte-Catherine, Quebec	New Brunswick (AUS)	—
53	(Sweden)	August Classon	Freshman	D	6' 0" (1.83 m)	185 lb (84 kg)	2004-08-03	Stockholm, Sweden	Lone Star Brahmas (NAHL)	—
90	(United States)	Diego Buttazzoni	Freshman	F	5' 9" (1.75 m)	183 lb (83 kg)	2006-01-13	Langley, British Columbia	Portland Winterhawks (WHL)	—

== Standings ==
2025–26 Hockey East Standings
	Conference record										Overall record					
	GP	W	L	T	OTW	OTL	SW	PTS	GF	GA	GP	W	L	T	GF	GA
#9 Providence †	24	18	5	1	2	1	0	54	86	46	36	23	11	2	120	82
#16 Massachusetts	24	14	9	1	2	1	1	43	63	53	36	22	13	1	101	83
#13 Connecticut	24	12	9	3	1	1	2	41	73	59	38	20	13	5	116	90
#19 Boston College	24	13	11	0	1	1	2	39	69	59	36	20	15	1	116	92
Maine	24	12	11	1	3	2	0	36	76	79	35	18	14	3	116	96
Boston University	24	12	12	0	3	2	0	35	69	74	36	17	17	2	105	110
Northeastern	24	11	13	0	1	3	0	35	67	62	36	17	18	1	98	91
#15 Merrimack *	24	10	12	2	0	1	1	34	68	75	39	21	16	2	121	110
Massachusetts Lowell	24	9	15	0	1	2	0	28	66	80	35	13	22	0	91	114
New Hampshire	24	8	15	1	0	0	1	26	41	73	35	14	20	1	68	105
Vermont	24	8	15	1	0	0	0	25	55	83	35	13	21	1	73	115
Championship: March 21, 2026 † indicates regular season champion * indicates conference tournament champion (Lamoriello Trophy); Rankings: USCHO Division I Men's Poll; updated April 15, 2026

== Schedule and results ==
Date	Time	Opponent^{#}	Rank^{#}	Site	TV	Decision	Result	Attendance	Record
Regular Season
October 3	7:15 pm	Merrimack		Tsongas Center • Lowell, Massachusetts	ESPN+	Elliott	W 4–0	6,804	1–0–0 (1–0–0)
October 10	7:00 pm	at Merrimack		J. Thom Lawler Rink • North Andover, Massachusetts	ESPN+	Richard	L 1–4	1,858	1–1–0 (1–1–0)
October 17	7:15 pm	#2 Western Michigan*		Tsongas Center • Lowell, Massachusetts	ESPN+	Elliott	L 1–2	5,095	1–2–0
October 18	6:05 pm	#2 Western Michigan*		Tsongas Center • Lowell, Massachusetts	ESPN+	Elliott	L 0–6	5,294	1–3–0
October 24	7:00 pm	at Mercyhurst*		Mercyhurst Ice Center • Erie, Pennsylvania	FloHockey	Richard	W 4–0	609	2–3–0
October 25	4:00 pm	at Mercyhurst*		Mercyhurst Ice Center • Erie, Pennsylvania	FloHockey	Elliott	W 4–3	207	3–3–0
October 31	7:00 pm	at #16 Providence		Schneider Arena • Providence, Rhode Island	ESPN+	Richard	L 2–5	2,010	3–4–0 (1–2–0)
November 1	6:05 pm	#16 Providence		Tsongas Center • Lowell, Massachusetts	ESPN+, NESN	Elliott	W 5–1	4,970	4–4–0 (2–2–0)
November 7	7:15 pm	New Hampshire		Tsongas Center • Lowell, Massachusetts	ESPN+	Elliott	L 0–2	6,008	4–5–0 (2–3–0)
November 8	7:00 pm	at New Hampshire		Whittemore Center • Durham, New Hampshire	ESPN+	Elliott	W 6–1	4,771	5–5–0 (3–3–0)
November 14	7:00 pm	at Union*		M&T Bank Center • Schenectady, New York	ESPN+	Elliott	L 1–7	1,979	5–6–0
November 15	4:00 pm	at Rensselaer*		Houston Field House • Troy, New York	ESPN+	Richard	L 0–2	1,217	5–7–0
Adirondack Winter Invitational
November 28	7:30 pm	vs. Clarkson*		Herb Brooks Arena • Lake Placid, New York (Adirondack Game 1)	ESPN+	Elliott	L 0–2	1,226	5–8–0
November 29	4:00 pm	vs. St. Lawrence*		Herb Brooks Arena • Lake Placid, New York (Adirondack Game 2)	ESPN+	Elliott	W 7–3	1,385	6–8–0
December 5	7:15 pm	#15 Boston College		Tsongas Center • Lowell, Massachusetts	ESPN+	Elliott	L 1–3	6,143	6–9–0 (3–4–0)
December 6	7:00 pm	at #15 Boston College		Conte Forum • Chestnut Hill, Massachusetts	ESPN+	Richard	L 1–3	5,332	6–10–0 (3–5–0)
December 10	7:00 pm	vs. #15 Maine		Cross Insurance Arena • Portland, Maine	ESPN+	Elliott	L 4–5 ^{OT}	5,732	6–11–0 (3–6–0)
December 28	3:30 pm	Bentley*		Tsongas Center • Lowell, Massachusetts (Exhibition)	ESPN+		W 3–2 ^{OT}		
Coachella Valley Cactus Cup
January 2	6:30 pm	vs. #14 Minnesota State*		Acrisure Arena • Thousand Palms, California (Cactus Cup Semifinal)		Richard	W 3–1	—	7–11–0
January 3	10:00 pm	vs. St. Cloud State*		Acrisure Arena • Thousand Palms, California (Cactus Cup Championship)		Richard	L 2–3	—	7–12–0
January 9	7:00 pm	at #10 Connecticut		PeoplesBank Arena • Hartford, Connecticut	ESPN+	Elliott	W 5–3	5,239	8–12–0 (4–6–0)
January 10	6:05 pm	#10 Connecticut		Tsongas Center • Lowell, Massachusetts	ESPN+, NESN	Elliott	L 1–5	5,323	8–13–0 (4–7–0)
January 16	7:00 pm	at #20 Boston University		Agganis Arena • Boston, Massachusetts	ESPN+	Richard	W 4–3 ^{OT}	4,813	9–13–0 (5–7–0)
January 17	6:05 pm	#20 Boston University		Tsongas Center • Lowell, Massachusetts	ESPN+	Elliott	L 0–3	5,856	9–14–0 (5–8–0)
January 23	7:15 pm	#17 Maine		Tsongas Center • Lowell, Massachusetts	ESPN+, NESN	Elliott	L 0–2	5,402	9–15–0 (5–9–0)
January 24	6:05 pm	#17 Maine		Tsongas Center • Lowell, Massachusetts	ESPN+	Richard	L 5–6 ^{OT}	5,567	9–16–0 (5–10–0)
February 1	3:30 pm	Massachusetts		Tsongas Center • Lowell, Massachusetts	ESPN+, NESN	Elliott	L 4–6	5,703	9–17–0 (5–11–0)
February 6	7:15 pm	#19 Massachusetts		Tsongas Center • Lowell, Massachusetts	ESPN+	Elliott	W 3–1	4,482	10–17–0 (6–11–0)
February 7	7:00 pm	at #19 Massachusetts		Mullins Center • Amherst, Massachusetts	ESPN+	Elliott	L 2–5	5,226	10–18–0 (6–12–0)
February 13	7:00 pm	at Vermont		Gutterson Fieldhouse • Burlington, Vermont	ESPN+	Richard	W 4–2	2,022	11–18–0 (7–12–0)
February 14	6:00 pm	at Vermont		Gutterson Fieldhouse • Burlington, Vermont	ESPN+	Richard	W 5–2	2,130	12–18–0 (8–12–0)
February 20	7:15 pm	Northeastern		Tsongas Center • Lowell, Massachusetts	ESPN+	Richard	L 0–2	2,442	12–19–0 (8–13–0)
February 21	6:05 pm	Northeastern		Tsongas Center • Lowell, Massachusetts	ESPN+	Richard	L 2–8	5,134	12–20–0 (8–14–0)
March 6	7:00 pm	at Merrimack		J. Thom Lawler Rink • North Andover, Massachusetts	ESPN+	Elliott	L 3–5	1,986	12–21–0 (8–15–0)
March 7	6:05 pm	Boston University		Tsongas Center • Lowell, Massachusetts	ESPN+, NESN+	Richard	W 4–3	5,959	13–21–0 (9–15–0)
Hockey East Tournament
March 11	7:00 pm	at Merrimack*		J. Thom Lawler Rink • North Andover, Massachusetts (Hockey East Opening Round)	ESPN+	Richard	L 3–5	1,992	13–22–0
*Non-conference game. ^{#}Rankings from USCHO.com Poll. All times are in Eastern Time. Source:

== Rankings ==
Poll	Week																											
Poll	Pre	1	2	3	4	5	6	7	8	9	10	11	12	13	14	15	16	17	18	19	20	21	22	23	24	25	26	27 (Final)
USCHO.com	RV	RV	RV	NR	NR	RV	NR	NR	NR	NR	NR	NR	–															
USA Hockey	RV	RV	NR	NR	NR	NR	NR	NR	NR	NR	NR	NR	–															

Note: USCHO did not release a poll in week 12.
Note: USA Hockey did not release a poll in week 12.
