= 2025–26 RPI Engineers men's ice hockey season =

- Conference: ECAC Hockey
- Home ice: Houston Field House

Record
- Overall: 9–22–1
- Conference: 6–13–1
- Home: 5–11–1
- Road: 4–10–0
- Neutral: 0–1–0

Coaches and captains
- Head coach: Eric Lang
- Assistant coaches: Mathias Lange; Cory Schneider

The 2025–26 RPI Engineers Men's ice hockey season will be the 106th season of play for the program and the 64th in ECAC Hockey. The Engineers will represent Rensselaer Polytechnic Institute in the 2025–26 NCAA Division I men's ice hockey season, play their home games at Houston Field House and be coached by Eric Lang in his 1st season.

== Departures ==
Player	Position	Nationality	Cause
Jack Agnew	Defenseman	Canada	Graduation (retired)
John Beaton	Forward	Canada	Graduation (retired)
Arvils Bergmanis	Defenseman	Latvia	Graduation (retired)
Jack Brackett	Forward	United States	Graduation (signed with Greenville Swamp Rabbits)
Félix Caron	Goaltender	Canada	Transferred to Ohio State
Jake Gagnon	Forward	Canada	Graduation (signed with Anglet Hormadi Élite)
Noah Giesbrecht	Goaltender	Canada	Graduation (retired)
Will Gilson	Defenseman	United States	Transferred to Quinnipiac
Tyler Hotson	Forward	Canada	Transferred to Bowling Green
Jakob Lee	Forward	Canada	Graduation (signed with HC Lugano)
Brody Maguire	Defenseman	Canada	Left program (retired)
Elliott McDermott	Defenseman	Canada	Graduation (signed with Adirondack Thunder)
Sutter Muzzatti	Forward	United States	Transferred to Notre Dame
Jérémie Payant	Forward	Canada	Transferred to McGill
Max Smolinski	Defenseman	United States	Transferred to St. Cloud State
Nick Strom	Defenseman	Canada	Transferred to Canisius
Nathan Sullivan	Forward	Canada	Transferred to British Columbia
Jordan Tonelli	Forward	United States	Graduation (retired)
Jack Watson	Goaltender	Canada	Graduation (retired)

== Recruiting ==
Player	Position	Nationality	Age	Notes
Ethan Bono	Forward	Canada	21	Port McNeill, BC; transfer from Merrimack
Bruno Brūveris	Goaltender	Latvia	23	Riga, LAT; transfer from Miami
Matthew Buckley	Forward	Canada	20	Oakville, ON
Cole Gordon	Forward	United States	22	Windsor, CO; transfer from Arizona State
Jack Gorton	Forward	United States	23	Granite Springs, NY; transfer from Boston University
Landen Hilditch	Defenseman	Canada	20	Surrey, BC
Matthew Jovanovic	Defenseman	Canada	21	Toronto, ON
Thomas Klassek	Defenseman	Austria	20	Klagenfurt, AUT
Nate Krawchuk	Goaltender	Canada	20	Thunder Bay, ON
Jackson Kyrkostas	Forward	United States	21	Windham, NH
Lucas Lemieux	Defenseman	Canada	20	Edmonton, AB
Alfred Lindberg	Forward	Sweden	23	Hallsberg, SWE; transfer from American International
Trevor Russell	Defenseman	United States	25	Old Hickory, TN; graduate transfer from Michigan Tech
Ian Scherzer	Forward	Austria	20	Villach, AUT
Filip Sitar	Forward	Slovenia	20	Ljubljana, SLO; transfer from Connecticut
Kazimier Sobieski	Defenseman	United States	21	Deerfield, MA; transfer from Massachusetts
Gunnar VanDamme	Defenseman	United States	22	Pittsford, NY; transfer from Alaska Anchorage
Tyler Wallace	Forward	Canada	23	Calgary, AB; transfer from Niagara
Luc Wilson	Forward	Canada	23	Duncan, BC; transfer from Minnesota State

== Roster ==
As of August 19, 2025.

No.	Nat.	Player	Class	Pos	Height	Weight	DoB	Hometown	Previous team	NHL rights
2	(United States)	Jimmy Goffredo	Sophomore	D	5' 11" (1.8 m)	185 lb (84 kg)	2003-04-24	Mount Laurel, New Jersey	Des Moines Buccaneers (USHL)	—
4	(Canada)	Matthew Jovanovic	Freshman	D	6' 2" (1.88 m)	201 lb (91 kg)	2004-09-22	Toronto, Ontario	Saginaw Spirit (OHL)	—
5	(United States)	Kazimier Sobieski	Sophomore	D	6' 1" (1.85 m)	181 lb (82 kg)	2004-04-12	Deerfield, Massachusetts	Sioux Falls Stampede (USHL)	—
6	(Austria)	Thomas Klassek	Freshman	D	6' 0" (1.83 m)	183 lb (83 kg)	2005-02-18	Klagenfurt, Austria	EC KAC (ICEHL)	—
8	(United States)	Gunnar VanDamme	Junior	F	6' 0" (1.83 m)	182 lb (83 kg)	2002-12-08	Pittsford, New York	Alaska Anchorage (NCAA)	—
9	(Canada)	Ethan Bono	Sophomore	F	6' 3" (1.91 m)	201 lb (91 kg)	2004-01-15	Port McNeill, British Columbia	Merrimack (HEA)	—
10	(Latvia)	Gustavs Ozoliņš	Sophomore	D	5' 10" (1.78 m)	181 lb (82 kg)	2003-06-19	Riga, Latvia	Minnesota Wilderness (NAHL)	—
11	(Latvia)	Rainers Rullers	Sophomore	F	6' 4" (1.93 m)	194 lb (88 kg)	2004-12-11	Riga, Latvia	Madison Capitols (USHL)	—
14	(United States)	Trevor Russell	Graduate	D	6' 2" (1.88 m)	197 lb (89 kg)	2000-02-02	Old Hickory, Tennessee	Michigan Tech (CCHA)	—
16	(Canada)	Lucas Lemieux	Freshman	D	6' 4" (1.93 m)	201 lb (91 kg)	2005-09-29	Edmonton, Alberta	Trail Smoke Eaters (BCHL)	—
18	(Canada)	Tyler Wallace	Junior	F	6' 2" (1.88 m)	188 lb (85 kg)	2002-05-19	Calgary, Alberta	Niagara (AHA)	—
19	(United States)	Jackson Kyrkostas	Freshman	F	6' 0" (1.83 m)	170 lb (77 kg)	2004-08-19	Windham, New Hampshire	West Kelowna Warriors (BCHL)	—
21	(Canada)	Matthew Buckley	Freshman	F	5' 11" (1.8 m)	183 lb (83 kg)	2005-05-21	Oakville, Ontario	Oshawa Generals (OHL)	—
22	(Canada)	Landen Hilditch	Freshman	D	6' 4" (1.93 m)	201 lb (91 kg)	2005-08-17	Surrey, British Columbia	Penticton Vees (BCHL)	—
24	(United States)	Jack Gorton	Junior	F	6' 3" (1.91 m)	200 lb (91 kg)	2002-02-13	Granite Springs, New York	Boston University (HEA)	—
25	(Canada)	Dovar Tinling	Senior (RS)	F	5' 11" (1.8 m)	185 lb (84 kg)	2003-03-03	Pointe-Claire, Quebec	Penticton Vees (BCHL)	—
27	(United States)	Cole Gordon	Sophomore	F	6' 2" (1.88 m)	205 lb (93 kg)	2002-12-09	Windsor, Colorado	Arizona State (NCHC)	—
30	(Canada)	Nate Krawchuk	Freshman	G	6' 3" (1.91 m)	190 lb (86 kg)	2005-07-04	Thunder Bay, Ontario	Sudbury Wolves (OHL)	—
32	(United States)	Carson Dorfman	Sophomore	G	6' 0" (1.83 m)	179 lb (81 kg)	2003-10-06	Hermitage, Tennessee	Sioux City Musketeers (USHL)	—
33	(Latvia)	Bruno Brūveris	Junior	G	6' 0" (1.83 m)	170 lb (77 kg)	2002-03-09	Riga, Latvia	Cedar Rapids RoughRiders (USHL)	—
43	(United States)	Brad McNeil	Junior	F	6' 0" (1.83 m)	181 lb (82 kg)	2002-03-15	Royal Oak, Michigan	Maryland Black Bears (NAHL)	—
49	(Slovenia)	Filip Sitar	Sophomore	F	5' 11" (1.8 m)	183 lb (83 kg)	2005-06-29	Ljubljana, Slovenia	Malmö Redhawks J20 (J20 Nationell)	—
61	(Canada)	Lucas Matta	Senior	D	6' 2" (1.88 m)	185 lb (84 kg)	2002-10-04	Kleinburg, Ontario	Western Michigan (NCHC)	—
72	(Canada)	Jagger Tapper	Sophomore	F	6' 0" (1.83 m)	185 lb (84 kg)	2004-10-01	Calgary, Alberta	Okotoks Oilers (BCHL)	—
82	(Canada)	Mathieu Bourgault	Freshman (RS)	F	6' 2" (1.88 m)	176 lb (80 kg)	2003-03-31	Saint-Bruno-de-Montarville, Quebec	Bismarck Bobcats (NAHL)	—
86	(Sweden)	Alfred Lindberg	Junior	F	5' 11" (1.8 m)	185 lb (84 kg)	2002-01-28	Hallsberg, Sweden	American International (AHA)	—
91	(Austria)	Ian Scherzer	Freshman	F	6' 0" (1.83 m)	192 lb (87 kg)	2005-07-03	Villach, Austria	Madison Capitols (USHL)	—
93	(Canada)	Luc Wilson	Graduate	F	5' 8" (1.73 m)	170 lb (77 kg)	2001-11-22	Duncan, British Columbia	Minnesota State (CCHA)	—

== Standings ==
2025–26 ECAC Hockey Standings
	Conference record										Overall record					
	GP	W	L	T	OTW	OTL	SW	PTS	GF	GA	GP	W	L	T	GF	GA
#8 Quinnipiac †	22	17	4	1	2	0	0	50	102	48	40	27	10	3	162	95
#10 Dartmouth *	22	13	5	4	0	1	3	47	81	53	35	23	8	4	125	75
#12 Cornell	22	15	6	1	1	1	1	47	71	42	34	22	11	1	109	69
Princeton	22	11	9	2	0	1	1	37	63	57	34	18	13	3	103	90
Union	22	11	9	2	1	1	1	36	71	68	37	22	12	3	140	98
Harvard	22	11	10	1	0	1	0	35	61	64	34	16	16	2	92	100
Colgate	22	9	10	3	2	0	2	30	68	74	37	13	20	4	99	125
Clarkson	22	9	10	3	2	0	1	29	65	65	38	18	17	3	111	111
Rensselaer	22	8	13	1	0	1	0	26	55	70	35	11	23	1	80	115
Yale	22	7	14	1	2	2	0	22	63	80	31	8	22	1	79	115
St. Lawrence	22	6	15	1	0	0	1	20	59	99	35	7	25	3	85	151
Brown	22	4	16	2	0	2	1	17	44	83	31	5	24	2	63	119
Championship: March 21, 2026 † indicates conference regular season champion (Cleary Cup) * indicates conference tournament champion (Whitelaw Cup); Rankings: USCHO.com Top 20 Poll; updated April 15, 2026

== Schedule and results ==
Date	Time	Opponent^{#}	Rank^{#}	Site	TV	Decision	Result	Attendance	Record
Exhibition
October 5	5:00 pm	at #2 Boston University*		Agganis Arena • Boston, Massachusetts (Exhibition)	ESPN+	Krawchuk	L 0–3		
Regular Season
October 10	7:00 pm	Miami*		Houston Field House • Troy, New York	ESPN+, SNY	Brūveris	L 3–5	1,386	0–1–0
October 11	6:00 pm	Miami*		Houston Field House • Troy, New York	ESPN+	Krawchuk	L 0–5	1,575	0–2–0
October 17	7:00 pm	#9 Boston College*		Houston Field House • Troy, New York	ESPN+, SNY	Brūveris	L 1–5	2,293	0–3–0
October 18	4:00 pm	#14 Providence*		Houston Field House • Troy, New York	ESPN+	Dorfman	L 1–5	1,407	0–4–0
October 24	8:07 pm	#20 Minnesota State*		Mayo Clinic Health System Event Center • Mankato, Minnesota	Midco Sports+	Krawchuk	L 2–4	3,968	0–5–0
October 25	7:07 pm	#20 Minnesota State*		Mayo Clinic Health System Event Center • Mankato, Minnesota	Midco Sports+	Brūveris	L 1–2	3,897	0–6–0
October 31	7:00 pm	at Union		M&T Bank Center • Schenectady, New York (Rivalry)	ESPN+	Krawchuk	W 5–2	2,034	1–6–0 (1–0–0)
November 1	4:00 pm	Union		Houston Field House • Troy, New York (Rivalry)	ESPN+	Krawchuk	L 0–3	2,710	1–7–0 (1–1–0)
November 7	7:00 pm	St. Lawrence		Houston Field House • Troy, New York	ESPN+	Krawchuk	L 3–4	1,308	1–8–0 (1–2–0)
November 8	7:00 pm	Clarkson		Houston Field House • Troy, New York (Rivalry)	ESPN+	Brūveris	W 5–1	2,269	2–8–0 (2–2–0)
November 14	7:00 pm	New Hampshire*		Houston Field House • Troy, New York	ESPN+	Krawchuk	L 3–6	1,788	2–9–0
November 15	4:00 pm	Massachusetts Lowell*		Houston Field House • Troy, New York	ESPN+	Krawchuk	W 2–0	1,217	3–9–0
November 21	7:00 pm	at Colgate		Class of 1965 Arena • Hamilton, New York	ESPN+	Krawchuk	L 1–2	693	3–10–0 (2–3–0)
November 22	7:00 pm	at #19 Cornell		Lynah Rink • Ithaca, New York	ESPN+	Krawchuk	L 1–6	3,760	3–11–0 (2–4–0)
November 28	6:00 pm	at Niagara*		Dwyer Arena • Lewiston, New York	FloHockey	Krawchuk	W 4–1	863	4–11–0
November 29	5:00 pm	at Niagara*		Dwyer Arena • Lewiston, New York	FloHockey	Brūveris	W 3–2	837	5–11–0
December 5	7:00 pm	#8 Quinnipiac		Houston Field House • Troy, New York	ESPN+	Brūveris	L 1–5	1,355	5–12–0 (2–5–0)
December 6	6:00 pm	Princeton		Houston Field House • Troy, New York	ESPN+	Krawchuk	L 0–4	1,360	5–13–0 (2–6–0)
January 3	6:00 pm	at Vermont*		Gutterson Fieldhouse • Burlington, Vermont	ESPN+	Krawchuk	L 0–3	2,303	5–14–0
January 9	7:00 pm	at #20 Princeton		Hobey Baker Memorial Rink • Princeton, New Jersey	ESPN+	Krawchuk	L 2–5	1,847	5–15–0 (2–7–0)
January 10	7:00 pm	at #8 Quinnipiac		M&T Bank Arena • Hamden, Connecticut	ESPN+	Krawchuk	L 3–4 ^{OT}	2,938	5–16–0 (2–8–0)
January 16	7:00 pm	Yale		Houston Field House • Troy, New York	ESPN+	Krawchuk	L 3–8	1,679	5–17–0 (2–9–0)
January 17	4:00 pm	Brown		Houston Field House • Troy, New York	ESPN+	Krawchuk	W 4–1	1,702	6–17–0 (3–9–0)
January 24	6:00 pm	vs. Union*		MVP Arena • Albany, New York (Mayor's Cup)		Krawchuk	L 4–5 ^{OT}	—	6–18–0
January 30	7:00 pm	at Harvard		Bright-Landry Hockey Center • Boston, Massachusetts	ESPN+	Krawchuk	L 1–3	2,143	6–19–0 (3–10–0)
January 31	7:00 pm	at #14 Dartmouth		Thompson Arena • Hanover, New Hampshire	ESPN+	Brūveris	L 1–3	2,899	6–20–0 (3–11–0)
February 6	7:00 pm	at Clarkson		Cheel Arena • Potsdam, New York (Rivalry)	ESPN+	Krawchuk	W 4–3	1,567	7–20–0 (4–11–0)
February 7	7:00 pm	at St. Lawrence		Appleton Arena • Canton, New York	ESPN+	Brūveris	L 3–7	853	7–21–0 (4–12–0)
February 13	7:00 pm	#9 Cornell		Houston Field House • Troy, New York	ESPN+	Brūveris	T 1–1 ^{SOL}	2,132	7–21–1 (4–12–1)
February 14	7:00 pm	Colgate		Houston Field House • Troy, New York	ESPN+	Krawchuk	W 4–1	1,875	8–21–1 (5–12–1)
February 20	7:00 pm	#14 Dartmouth		Houston Field House • Troy, New York	ESPN+	Brūveris	L 1–3	2,005	8–22–1 (5–13–1)
February 21	7:00 pm	Harvard		Houston Field House • Troy, New York	ESPN+	Krawchuk	W 3–1	4,456	9–22–1 (6–13–1)
February 27	7:00 pm	at Brown		Meehan Auditorium • Providence, Rhode Island	ESPN+	Krawchuk	W 3–1	337	10–22–1 (7–13–1)
February 28	7:00 pm	at Yale		Ingalls Rink • New Haven, Connecticut	ESPN+	Krawchuk	W 4–2	1,783	11–22–1 (8–13–1)
ECAC Hockey Tournament
March 6	7:00 pm	at Clarkson*		Cheel Arena • Potsdam, New York (ECAC First Round, Rivalry)	ESPN+	Krawchuk	L 2–1	2,730	11–23–1
*Non-conference game. ^{#}Rankings from USCHO.com Poll. All times are in Eastern Time. Source:

== Rankings ==
Poll	Week																											
Poll	Pre	1	2	3	4	5	6	7	8	9	10	11	12	13	14	15	16	17	18	19	20	21	22	23	24	25	26	27 (Final)
USCHO.com	NR	NR	NR	NR	NR	NR	NR	NR	NR	NR	NR	NR	–															
USA Hockey	NR	NR	NR	NR	NR	NR	NR	NR	NR	NR	NR	NR	–															

Note: USCHO did not release a poll in week 12.
Note: USA Hockey did not release a poll in week 12.
