= 2025–26 Quinnipiac Bobcats men's ice hockey season =

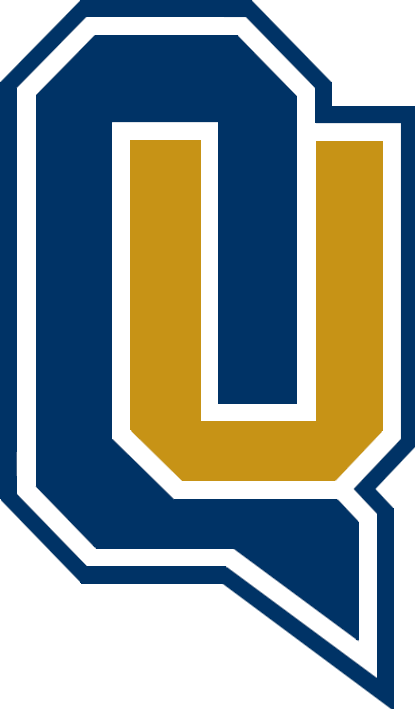

ECAC Hockey Regular Season, Champion NCAA Tournament, Regional Final
- Conference: 1st ECAC Hockey
- Home ice: M&T Bank Arena

Rankings
- USCHO: #8
- USA Hockey: #8

Record
- Overall: 27–10–3
- Conference: 17–4–1
- Home: 14–3–2
- Road: 10–4–1
- Neutral: 3–3–0

Coaches and captains
- Head coach: Rand Pecknold
- Assistant coaches: Joe Dumais; Justin Eddy
- Captain: Victor Czerneckianair
- Alternate captain(s): Jeremy Wilmer, Mason Marcellus, Charlie Leddy

The 2025–26 Quinnipiac Bobcats Men's ice hockey season was the 50th season of play for the program, the 28th at the Division I level and 21st in ECAC Hockey. The Bobcats represented Quinnipiac University in the 2025–26 NCAA Division I men's ice hockey season, played their home games at the M&T Bank Arena and were coached by Rand Pecknold in his 32nd season.

== Departures ==
Player	Position	Nationality	Cause
Noah Altman	Goaltender	United States	Graduation (retired)
Nate Benoit	Defenseman	United States	Transferred to Long Island
Aaron Bohlinger	Defenseman	United States	Graduation (signed with Cincinnati Cyclones)
Noah Eyre	Forward	United States	Transferred to Holy Cross
Cooper Moore	Defenseman	United States	Graduation (signed with Hartford Wolf Pack)
Davis Pennington	Defenseman	United States	Graduation (signed with Kalamazoo Wings)
Chase Ramsay	Defenseman	United States	Transferred to Sacred Heart
Jack Ricketts	Forward	Canada	Graduation (retired)
Michael Salandra	Forward	United States	Transferred to Brown
Ryan Smith	Forward	United States	Transferred to Miami
Travis Treloar	Forward	Sweden	Graduation (signed with Mora IK)

== Recruiting ==
Player	Position	Nationality	Age	Notes
Will Gilson	Defenseman	United States	24	Old Greenwich, CT; transfer from Rensselaer
Matthew Lansing	Forward	United States	18	Tonawanda, NY; selected 207th overall in 2025
Logan McCutcheon	Defenseman	Canada	21	Saskatoon, SK
Ben Riche	Forward	Canada	20	Bethune, SK
Brady Schultz	Defenseman	United States	21	Monroe, CT
Sam Scopa	Goaltender	United States	20	Lexington, MA
Nate Tivey	Defenseman	Canada	21	Burlington, ON
Antonin Verreault	Forward	Canada	21	Mirabel, QC
Markus Vidicek	Forward	Canada	21	Montréal, QC
Ethan Wyttenbach	Forward	United States	18	Roslyn, NY; selected 144th overall in 2025

== Roster ==
As of September August 9, 2025.

No.	Nat.	Player	Class	Pos	Height	Weight	DoB	Hometown	Previous team	NHL rights
2	(Canada)	Drew Hockley	Sophomore	D	6' 3" (1.91 m)	190 lb (86 kg)	2005-03-03	Kentville, Nova Scotia	Victoria Grizzlies (BCHL)	—
3	(United States)	William Gilson	Senior	D	6' 0" (1.83 m)	170 lb (77 kg)	2001-06-28	Old Greenwich, Connecticut	Rensselaer (ECAC)	—
4	(Canada)	Logan McCutcheon	Freshman	D	5' 9" (1.75 m)	161 lb (73 kg)	2004-01-29	Saskatoon, Saskatchewan	Lethbridge Hurricanes (WHL)	—
5	(United States)	Brady Schultz	Freshman	D	5' 11" (1.8 m)	194 lb (88 kg)	2004-07-23	Monroe, Connecticut	Halifax Mooseheads (QMJHL)	—
6	(United States)	Charlie Leddy	Senior	D	6' 2" (1.88 m)	185 lb (84 kg)	2004-01-11	Fairfield, Connecticut	Boston College (HEA)	NJD, 126th overall 2022
7	(United States)	Elliott Groenewold	Sophomore	D	6' 2" (1.88 m)	201 lb (91 kg)	2006-02-04	Bellows Falls, Vermont	Cedar Rapids RoughRiders (USHL)	BOS, 110th overall 2024
8	(United States)	Matthew McGroarty	Junior	F	5' 10" (1.78 m)	172 lb (78 kg)	2003-01-30	Westport, Connecticut	Madison Capitols (USHL)	—
10	(United States)	Tyler Borgula	Sophomore	F	5' 9" (1.75 m)	170 lb (77 kg)	2005-10-06	Livonia, Michigan	Sioux Falls Stampede (USHL)	—
11	(United States)	Aaron Schwartz	Sophomore	F	5' 11" (1.8 m)	174 lb (79 kg)	2004-03-22	Parkland, Florida	Surrey Eagles (USHL)	—
12	(United States)	Markus Vidicek	Freshman	F	5' 10" (1.78 m)	172 lb (78 kg)	2004-03-21	Montréal, Quebec	Moncton Wildcats (QMJHL)	—
14	(United States)	Victor Czerneckianair	Senior	F	5' 11" (1.8 m)	174 lb (79 kg)	2002-02-17	Southington, Connecticut	Tri-City Storm (USHL)	—
16	(United States)	Jeremy Wilmer	Senior	F	5' 8" (1.73 m)	155 lb (70 kg)	2003-08-16	Rockville Centre, New York	Boston University (HEA)	—
17	(Canada)	Ben Riche	Freshman	F	5' 11" (1.8 m)	181 lb (82 kg)	2005-03-15	Bethune, Saskatchewan	Prince George Cougars (WHL)	—
18	(United States)	Anthony Cipollone	Senior	F	5' 6" (1.68 m)	165 lb (75 kg)	2002-05-14	Purchase, New York	Brooks Bandits (AJHL)	—
19	(United States)	Ethan Wyttenbach	Freshman	F	5' 10" (1.78 m)	181 lb (82 kg)	2007-02-10	Roslyn, New York	Sioux Falls Stampede (USHL)	CGY, 144th overall 2025
20	(Canada)	Mason Marcellus	Junior	F	5' 9" (1.75 m)	165 lb (75 kg)	2002-07-19	Greely, Ontario	Lincoln Stars (USHL)	—
22	(Canada)	Braden Blace	Sophomore	D	6' 3" (1.91 m)	190 lb (86 kg)	2003-09-09	Duncan, British Columbia	Alberni Valley Bulldogs (BCHL)	—
23	(United States)	Antonin Verreault	Freshman	F	5' 8" (1.73 m)	170 lb (77 kg)	2004-07-28	Mirabel, Quebec	Rouyn-Noranda Huskies (QMJHL)	—
24	(Canada)	Alex Power	Senior	F	6' 1" (1.85 m)	185 lb (84 kg)	2002-01-04	St. John's, Newfoundland and Labrador	Bonnyville Pontiacs (AJHL)	—
25	(Canada)	Nate Tivey	Freshman	D	6' 5" (1.96 m)	205 lb (93 kg)	2004-03-27	Burlington, Ontario	Saint John Sea Dogs (QMJHL)	—
26	(United States)	Matthew Lansing	Freshman	F	6' 1" (1.85 m)	185 lb (84 kg)	2007-02-24	Tonawanda, New York	Fargo Force (USHL)	VAN, 207th overall 2025
27	(United States)	Andon Cerbone	Junior	F	5' 9" (1.75 m)	163 lb (74 kg)	2004-04-13	Stamford, Connecticut	Youngstown Phantoms (USHL)	—
28	(United States)	Chris Pelosi	Sophomore	F	6' 1" (1.85 m)	181 lb (82 kg)	2005-03-05	Sewell, New Jersey	Sioux Falls Stampede (USHL)	BOS, 92nd overall 2023
29	(United States)	Dylan Silverstein	Sophomore (RS)	G	6' 0" (1.83 m)	179 lb (81 kg)	2004-02-07	Calabasas, California	Sioux City Musketeers (USHL)	—
31	(United States)	Sam Scopa	Freshman	G	6' 0" (1.83 m)	181 lb (82 kg)	2005-01-10	Lexington, Massachusetts	Madison Capitols (USHL)	—
33	(Slovakia)	Matej Marinov	Junior	G	6' 0" (1.83 m)	157 lb (71 kg)	2003-06-16	Nitra, Slovakia	Fargo Force (USHL)	—

== Standings ==
2025–26 ECAC Hockey Standings
	Conference record										Overall record					
	GP	W	L	T	OTW	OTL	SW	PTS	GF	GA	GP	W	L	T	GF	GA
#8 Quinnipiac †	22	17	4	1	2	0	0	50	102	48	40	27	10	3	162	95
#10 Dartmouth *	22	13	5	4	0	1	3	47	81	53	35	23	8	4	125	75
#12 Cornell	22	15	6	1	1	1	1	47	71	42	34	22	11	1	109	69
Princeton	22	11	9	2	0	1	1	37	63	57	34	18	13	3	103	90
Union	22	11	9	2	1	1	1	36	71	68	37	22	12	3	140	98
Harvard	22	11	10	1	0	1	0	35	61	64	34	16	16	2	92	100
Colgate	22	9	10	3	2	0	2	30	68	74	37	13	20	4	99	125
Clarkson	22	9	10	3	2	0	1	29	65	65	38	18	17	3	111	111
Rensselaer	22	8	13	1	0	1	0	26	55	70	35	11	23	1	80	115
Yale	22	7	14	1	2	2	0	22	63	80	31	8	22	1	79	115
St. Lawrence	22	6	15	1	0	0	1	20	59	99	35	7	25	3	85	151
Brown	22	4	16	2	0	2	1	17	44	83	31	5	24	2	63	119
Championship: March 21, 2026 † indicates conference regular season champion (Cleary Cup) * indicates conference tournament champion (Whitelaw Cup); Rankings: USCHO.com Top 20 Poll; updated April 15, 2026

== Schedule and results ==
Date	Time	Opponent^{#}	Rank^{#}	Site	TV	Decision	Result	Attendance	Record
Regular season
October 3	7:00 pm	at #6 Boston College*	#13	Conte Forum • Chestnut Hill, Massachusetts	ESPN+	Silverstein	W 4–3	7,884	1–0–0
October 5	2:00 pm	at #9 Providence*	#13	Schneider Arena • Providence, Rhode Island (Exhibition)	ESPN+	Marinov	L 1–2		
Ice Breaker Tournament
October 10	5:00 pm	vs. Alaska*	#8	Mullett Arena • Tempe, Arizona (Ice Breaker Semifinal)		Silverstein	L 1–2	300	1–1–0
October 11	5:00 pm	vs. Notre Dame*	#8	Mullett Arena • Tempe, Arizona (Ice Breaker Consolation Game)		Marinov	W 7–2	—	2–1–0
Regular season
October 17	7:00 pm	#7 Maine*	#10	M&T Bank Arena • Hamden, Connecticut	ESPN+, NESN	Marinov	T 4–4 ^{OT}	3,625	2–1–1
October 18	4:00 pm	#7 Maine*	#10	M&T Bank Arena • Hamden, Connecticut	ESPN+	Marinov	W 4–0	3,625	3–1–1
October 21	7:00 pm	at Holy Cross*	#6	Hart Center • Worcester, Massachusetts	FloHockey	Marinov	W 4–1	1,673	4–1–1
October 24	7:00 pm	at Merrimack*	#6	J. Thom Lawler Rink • North Andover, Massachusetts	ESPN+	Marinov	L 1–4	2,478	4–2–1
October 25	7:00 pm	at New Hampshire*	#6	Whittemore Center • Durham, New Hampshire	ESPN+, NESN	Silverstein	W 2–0	6,501	5–2–1
November 4	7:00 pm	Alaska*	#5	M&T Bank Arena • Hamden, Connecticut	ESPN+	Marinov	T 2–2 ^{OT}	2,511	5–2–2
November 7	7:00 pm	at Yale	#5	Ingalls Rink • New Haven, Connecticut	ESPN+, SNY	Silverstein	L 2–4	1,960	5–3–2 (0–1–0)
November 8	7:00 pm	at Brown	#5	Meehan Auditorium • Providence, Rhode Island	ESPN+	Marinov	W 4–3 ^{OT}	772	6–3–2 (1–1–0)
November 15	7:00 pm	#13 Boston University*	#10	M&T Bank Arena • Hamden, Connecticut	ESPN+	Marinov	W 6–2	3,625	7–3–2
November 21	7:00 pm	Clarkson	#9	M&T Bank Arena • Hamden, Connecticut	ESPN+	Marinov	W 4–1	2,562	8–3–2 (2–1–0)
November 22	7:00 pm	St. Lawrence	#9	M&T Bank Arena • Hamden, Connecticut	ESPN+	Marinov	W 4–2	2,011	9–3–2 (3–1–0)
November 26	5:00 pm	Holy Cross*	#8	M&T Bank Arena • Hamden, Connecticut	ESPN+	Marinov	W 7–6 ^{OT}	1,733	10–3–2
November 29	4:00 pm	Stonehill*	#8	M&T Bank Arena • Hamden, Connecticut	ESPN+	Marinov	W 3–2	2,526	11–3–2
December 5	7:00 pm	at Rensselaer	#8	Houston Field House • Troy, New York	ESPN+	Marinov	W 5–1	1,355	12–3–2 (4–1–0)
December 6	7:00 pm	at Union	#8	M&T Bank Center • Schenectady, New York	ESPN+	Marinov	L 0–4	2,276	12–4–2 (4–2–0)
January 2	7:00 pm	#18 Harvard	#10	M&T Bank Arena • Hamden, Connecticut	ESPN+	Silverstein	W 9–1	3,070	13–4–2 (5–2–0)
January 3	7:00 pm	#9 Dartmouth	#10	M&T Bank Arena • Hamden, Connecticut	ESPN+	Marinov	W 5–3	3,041	14–4–2 (6–2–0)
January 9	7:00 pm	Union	#8	M&T Bank Arena • Hamden, Connecticut	ESPN+	Silverstein	W 7–2	2,898	15–4–2 (7–2–0)
January 10	7:00 pm	Rensselaer	#8	M&T Bank Arena • Hamden, Connecticut	ESPN+	Marinov	W 4–3 ^{OT}	2,938	16–4–2 (8–2–0)
January 16	7:00 pm	at Colgate	#7	Class of 1965 Arena • Hamilton, New York	ESPN+, SNY	Silverstein	W 5–1	855	17–4–2 (9–2–0)
January 17	7:00 pm	at #13 Cornell	#7	Lynah Rink • Ithaca, New York	ESPN+, SNY	Marinov	W 4–1	3,643	18–4–2 (10–2–0)
Connecticut Ice
January 23	4:00 pm	vs. Sacred Heart*	#6	Ingalls Rink • New Haven, Connecticut (Connecticut Ice Semifinal)	YES	Silverstein	W 5–1	2,100	19–4–2
January 24	7:30 pm	vs. #13 Connecticut*	#6	Ingalls Rink • New Haven, Connecticut (Connecticut Ice Championship)	YES	Marinov	L 2–4	2,521	19–5–2
Regular season
January 30	7:00 pm	at St. Lawrence	#6	Appleton Arena • Canton, New York	ESPN+	Marinov	W 7–0	656	20–5–2 (11–2–0)
January 31	7:00 pm	at Clarkson	#6	Cheel Arena • Potsdam, New York	ESPN+	Silverstein	T 3–3 ^{SOL}	2,556	20–5–3 (11–2–1)
February 6	7:00 pm	Brown	#5	M&T Bank Arena • Hamden, Connecticut	ESPN+	Marinov	W 9–1	2,895	21–5–3 (12–2–1)
February 7	7:00 pm	Yale	#5	M&T Bank Arena • Hamden, Connecticut	ESPN+	Silverstein	W 8–0	3,625	22–5–3 (13–2–1)
February 14	7:00 pm	Princeton	#5	M&T Bank Arena • Hamden, Connecticut	ESPN+	Marinov	W 4–1	2,759	23–5–3 (14–2–1)
February 15	4:00 pm	at Princeton	#5	Hobey Baker Memorial Rink • Princeton, New Jersey	ESPN+	Silverstein	W 4–1	2,230	24–5–3 (15–2–1)
February 20	7:00 pm	#11 Cornell	#5	M&T Bank Arena • Hamden, Connecticut	ESPN+	Silverstein	L 1–6	3,274	24–6–3 (15–3–1)
February 21	7:00 pm	Colgate	#5	M&T Bank Arena • Hamden, Connecticut	ESPN+	Marinov	W 5–2	3,223	25–6–3 (16–3–1)
February 27	7:00 pm	at #14 Dartmouth	#7	Thompson Arena • Hanover, New Hampshire	ESPN+	Marinov	L 4–7	2,991	25–7–3 (16–4–1)
February 28	7:00 pm	at Harvard	#7	Bright-Landry Hockey Center • Boston, Massachusetts	ESPN+, SNY	Silverstein	W 4–1	1,869	26–7–3 (17–4–1)
ECAC Hockey Tournament
March 13	7:00 pm	Clarkson*	#7	M&T Bank Arena • Hamden, Connecticut (ECAC Quarterfinal Game 1)	ESPN+	Silverstein	L 0–3	2,268	26–8–3
March 14	4:00 pm	Clarkson*	#7	M&T Bank Arena • Hamden, Connecticut (ECAC Quarterfinal Game 2)	ESPN+	Silverstein	L 3–4	2,441	26–9–3
NCAA Tournament
March 26	5:00 pm	vs. #7 Providence*	#11	Denny Sanford Premier Center • Sioux Falls, South Dakota (Regional Semifinal)	ESPN+	Silverstein	W 5–2	5,114	27–9–3
March 28	6:00 pm	vs. #2 North Dakota*	#11	Denny Sanford Premier Center • Sioux Falls, South Dakota (Regional Final)	ESPN2	Silverstein	L 0–5	6,209	27–10–3
*Non-conference game. ^{#}Rankings from USCHO.com Poll. All times are in Eastern Time. Source:

== Rankings ==
Poll	Week																											
Poll	Pre	1	2	3	4	5	6	7	8	9	10	11	12	13	14	15	16	17	18	19	20	21	22	23	24	25	26	27 (Final)
USCHO.com	13	8	10	6	7	5	10	9	8	8	10	10	–	10	8	7	6	6	5	5 (2)	5 (3)	7	8	7	10т	11	–	8
USA Hockey	13	9	10	6	6	5	9	9	8	8	10	10	–	10	8	7	7	6	5	5 (1)	5 (2)	7	8	7	10	10	8	8

Note: USCHO did not release a poll in week 12 or 26.
Note: USA Hockey did not release a poll in week 12.
