= 2025–26 Boston University Terriers men's ice hockey season =

- Conference: Hockey East
- Home ice: Agganis Arena

Record
- Overall: 16–16–2
- Conference: 12–12–0
- Home: 8–8–1
- Road: 7–7–0
- Neutral: 1–1–1

Coaches and captains
- Head coach: Jay Pandolfo
- Assistant coaches: Joe Pereira; Kim Brandvold; Cam Doomany
- Captain: Gavin McCarthy
- Alternate captain(s): Cole Eiserman; Jack Harvey; Cole Hutson

The 2025–26 Boston University Terriers Men's ice hockey season will be the 104th season of play for the program and 42nd in Hockey East. The Terriers will represent Boston University in the 2025–26 NCAA Division I men's ice hockey season, play their home games at Agganis Arena and be coached by Jay Pandolfo in his 4th season.

== Departures ==
Player	Position	Nationality	Cause
Tristan Amonte	Forward	United States	Graduation (signed with Savannah Ghost Pirates)
Mathieu Caron	Goaltender	Canada	Graduation (signed with Anglet Hormadi Élite)
Matt Copponi	Forward	United States	Graduation (signed with Bakersfield Condors)
Brehdan Engum	Defenseman	United States	Graduation (signed with Norfolk Admirals)
Billy Girard IV	Goaltender	United States	Graduation (signed with Huntsville Havoc)
Jack Gorton	Forward	United States	Transferred to Rensselaer
Ryan Greene	Forward	United States	Signed professional contract (Chicago Blackhawks)
Doug Grimes	Forward	United States	Transferred to Miami
Jack Hughes	Forward	United States	Graduation (signed with Ontario Reign)
Quinn Hutson	Forward	United States	Signed professional contract (Edmonton Oilers)
Devin Kaplan	Forward	United States	Signed professional contract (Philadelphia Flyers)
Shane Lachance	Forward	United States	Signed professional contract (New Jersey Devils)
Jack Page	Defenseman	United States	Graduation (signed with Reading Royals)
Tom Willander	Defenseman	Sweden	Signed professional contract (Vancouver Canucks)
Alexander Zetterberg	Forward	Sweden	Transferred to Minnesota State

== Recruiting ==
Player	Position	Nationality	Age	Notes
Carter Amico	Defenseman	United States	18	Westbrook, ME; selected 38th overall in 2025
Sacha Boisvert	Forward	Canada	19	Trois-Rivières, QC; transfer from North Dakota; selected 18th overall in 2024
Jay Feldberg	Forward	Canada	19	Toronto, ON
Conrad Fondrk	Forward	United States	18	Saint Paul, MN; selected 50th overall in 2025
Kyle Kim	Defenseman	United States	20	Northville, MI
Steven Luciano	Goaltender	United States	18	New Canaan, CT
Owen McLaughlin	Forward	United States	22	Phoenixville, PA; transfer from North Dakota; selected 206th overall in 2021
John McNelis	Forward	United States	19	Potomac, MD
Ben Merrill	Forward	United States	19	Hingham, MA; selected 166th overall in 2024
Jonathan Morello	Forward	Canada	19	Toronto, ON; selected 154th overall in 2024
Jack Murtagh	Forward	United States	18	East Greenbush, NY; selected 40th overall in 2025
Ryder Ritchie	Forward	Canada	19	Calgary, AB; selected 45th overall in 2024
Charlie Trethewey	Defenseman	United States	18	Ellicott City, MD; selected 73rd overall in 2025
Malte Vass	Defenseman	Canada	18	Karlstad, SWE; selected 76th overall in 2025

== Roster ==
As of September 8, 2025.

No.	Nat.	Player	Class	Pos	Height	Weight	DoB	Hometown	Previous team	NHL rights
1	(United States)	Steven Luciano	Freshman	G	6' 1" (1.85 m)	179 lb (81 kg)	2007-03-01	New Canaan, Connecticut	Salisbury School (USHS–CT)	—
2	(United States)	Gavin McCarthy (C)	Junior	D	6' 1" (1.85 m)	185 lb (84 kg)	2005-06-02	Clarence Center, New York	Muskegon Lumberjacks (USHL)	BUF, 86th overall 2023
7	(United States)	Nick Roukounakis	Sophomore	F	6' 2" (1.88 m)	225 lb (102 kg)	2003-09-08	Pembroke, Massachusetts	Tri-City Storm (USHL)	—
8	(United States)	Brandon Svoboda	Sophomore	F	6' 3" (1.91 m)	207 lb (94 kg)	2005-02-04	Level Green, Pennsylvania	Fargo Force (USHL)	SJS, 71st overall 2023
9	(Canada)	Sacha Boisvert	Sophomore	F	6' 2" (1.88 m)	176 lb (80 kg)	2006-05-17	Trois-Rivières, Québec	North Dakota (NCHC)	CHI, 18th overall 2024
10	(Canada)	Jonathan Morello	Freshman	F	6' 2" (1.88 m)	192 lb (87 kg)	2006-07-31	Toronto, Ontario	Dubuque Fighting Saints (USHL)	BOS, 154th overall 2024
12	(United States)	Jack Harvey (A)	Junior	F	5' 10" (1.78 m)	176 lb (80 kg)	2003-03-31	Stacy, Minnesota	Chicago Steel (USHL)	TBL, 193rd overall 2023
14	(United States)	Mick Frechette	Junior	D	6' 2" (1.88 m)	205 lb (93 kg)	2003-10-27	Weston, Massachusetts	Dexter Southfield School (USHS–MA)	—
15	(United States)	Carter Amico	Freshman	D	6' 5" (1.96 m)	225 lb (102 kg)	2007-03-15	Westbrook, Maine	USNTDP (USHL)	PHI, 38th overall 2025
16	(United States)	Conrad Fondrk	Freshman	F	6' 0" (1.83 m)	203 lb (92 kg)	2007-06-01	Saint Paul, Minnesota	USNTDP (USHL)	NJD, 50th overall 2025
18	(United States)	Jay Feldberg	Freshman	F	6' 0" (1.83 m)	185 lb (84 kg)	2006-02-21	Toronto, Ontario	Toronto Jr. Canadiens (OJHL)	—
19	(United States)	Jack Murtagh	Freshman	F	6' 1" (1.85 m)	198 lb (90 kg)	2007-08-22	East Greenbush, New York	USNTDP (USHL)	PHI, 40th overall 2025
21	(Canada)	Ryder Ritchie	Freshman	F	6' 2" (1.88 m)	190 lb (86 kg)	2006-08-03	Calgary, Alberta	Medicine Hat Tigers (WHL)	MIN, 45th overall 2024
22	(Canada)	Aiden Celebrini	Junior	F	6' 1" (1.85 m)	195 lb (88 kg)	2004-10-26	Vancouver, British Columbia	Brooks Bandits (AJHL)	VAN, 171st overall 2023
23	(United States)	Owen McLaughlin	Senior	F	6' 0" (1.83 m)	178 lb (81 kg)	2003-03-25	Spring City, Pennsylvania	North Dakota (NCHC)	PHI, 206th overall 2021
25	(United States)	Ben Merrill	Freshman	F	6' 4" (1.93 m)	205 lb (93 kg)	2005-11-04	Hingham, Massachusetts	Penticton Vees (BCHL)	MTL, 166th overall 2024
26	(United States)	John McNelis	Freshman	F	5' 10" (1.78 m)	165 lb (75 kg)	2006-01-08	Potomac, Maryland	Cedar Rapids RoughRiders (USHL)	—
27	(United States)	Kyle Kim	Freshman	D	6' 2" (1.88 m)	181 lb (82 kg)	2005-01-06	Northville, Michigan	New Jersey Titans (NAHL)	—
33	(United States)	Max Lacroix	Junior	G	6' 0" (1.83 m)	170 lb (77 kg)	2003-12-13	Castle Pines, Colorado	Colorado Grit (NAHL)	—
34	(United States)	Cole Eiserman (A)	Sophomore	F	6' 0" (1.83 m)	196 lb (89 kg)	2006-08-29	Newburyport, Massachusetts	USNTDP (USHL)	NYI, 20th overall 2024
38	(United States)	Kamil Bednarik	Sophomore	F	6' 0" (1.83 m)	185 lb (84 kg)	2006-05-26	Elk Grove Village, Illinois	USNTDP (USHL)	NYI, 61st overall 2024
40	(Russia)	Mikhail Yegorov	Sophomore	G	6' 5" (1.96 m)	187 lb (85 kg)	2006-03-07	St. Petersburg, Russia	Omaha Lancers (USHL)	NJD, 49th overall 2024
44	(United States)	Cole Hutson (A)	Sophomore	D	5' 10" (1.78 m)	165 lb (75 kg)	2006-06-28	North Barrington, Illinois	USNTDP (USHL)	WSH, 43rd overall 2024
57	(Sweden)	Malte Vass	Freshman	D	6' 3" (1.91 m)	194 lb (88 kg)	2007-03-28	Karlstad, Sweden	Färjestad BK J20 (J20 Nationell)	CBJ, 76th overall 2025
71	(Sweden)	Sascha Boumedienne	Sophomore	D	6' 2" (1.88 m)	183 lb (83 kg)	2007-01-17	Oulu, Finland	Youngstown Phantoms (USHL)	WPG, 28th overall 2025
91	(United States)	Charlie Trethewey	Freshman	D	6' 2" (1.88 m)	201 lb (91 kg)	2007-08-02	Ellicott City, Maryland	USNTDP (USHL)	PIT, 73rd overall 2025

== Standings ==
2025–26 Hockey East Standings
	Conference record										Overall record					
	GP	W	L	T	OTW	OTL	SW	PTS	GF	GA	GP	W	L	T	GF	GA
#9 Providence †	24	18	5	1	2	1	0	54	86	46	36	23	11	2	120	82
#16 Massachusetts	24	14	9	1	2	1	1	43	63	53	36	22	13	1	101	83
#13 Connecticut	24	12	9	3	1	1	2	41	73	59	38	20	13	5	116	90
#19 Boston College	24	13	11	0	1	1	2	39	69	59	36	20	15	1	116	92
Maine	24	12	11	1	3	2	0	36	76	79	35	18	14	3	116	96
Boston University	24	12	12	0	3	2	0	35	69	74	36	17	17	2	105	110
Northeastern	24	11	13	0	1	3	0	35	67	62	36	17	18	1	98	91
#15 Merrimack *	24	10	12	2	0	1	1	34	68	75	39	21	16	2	121	110
Massachusetts Lowell	24	9	15	0	1	2	0	28	66	80	35	13	22	0	91	114
New Hampshire	24	8	15	1	0	0	1	26	41	73	35	14	20	1	68	105
Vermont	24	8	15	1	0	0	0	25	55	83	35	13	21	1	73	115
Championship: March 21, 2026 † indicates regular season champion * indicates conference tournament champion (Lamoriello Trophy); Rankings: USCHO Division I Men's Poll; updated April 15, 2026

== Schedule and results ==
Date	Time	Opponent^{#}	Rank^{#}	Site	TV	Decision	Result	Attendance	Record
Regular Season
October 4	7:00 pm	Long Island*	#2	Agganis Arena • Boston, Massachusetts	ESPN+, TSN+	Yegorov	W 4–2	5,170	1–0–0
October 5	5:00 pm	Rensselaer*	#2	Agganis Arena • Boston, Massachusetts (Exhibition)	ESPN+	Lacroix	W 3–0		
October 10	7:00 pm	Colgate*	#3	Agganis Arena • Boston, Massachusetts	ESPN+	Yegorov	W 6–2	4,126	2–0–0
October 11	6:00 pm	Colgate*	#3	Agganis Arena • Boston, Massachusetts	ESPN+	Yegorov	T 2–2 ^{OT}	3,726	2–0–1
October 17	7:00 pm	#3 Michigan State*	#1	Agganis Arena • Boston, Massachusetts	ESPN2, TSN5	Yegorov	L 2–4	6,148	2–1–1
October 18	7:00 pm	#3 Michigan State*	#1	Agganis Arena • Boston, Massachusetts	ESPN+	Yegorov	L 3–4 ^{OT}	7,033	2–2–1
October 24	7:00 pm	#11 Connecticut	#4	Agganis Arena • Boston, Massachusetts	ESPN+	Yegorov	L 4–8	5,464	2–3–1 (0–1–0)
October 25	5:00 pm	at #11 Connecticut	#4	Toscano Family Ice Forum • Storrs, Connecticut	ESPN+	Yegorov	W 3–1	2,513	3–3–1 (1–1–0)
October 31	7:00 pm	at #12 Maine	#5	Alfond Arena • Orono, Maine (Rivalry)	ESPN+	Yegorov	L 4–5 ^{OT}	4,980	3–4–1 (1–2–0)
November 1	7:30 pm	at #12 Maine	#5	Alfond Arena • Orono, Maine (Rivalry)	ESPN+, NESN	Lacroix	L 5–8	4,980	3–5–1 (1–3–0)
November 7	7:00 pm	Merrimack	#12	Agganis Arena • Boston, Massachusetts	ESPN+	Yegorov	W 3–2 ^{OT}	5,453	4–5–1 (2–3–0)
November 8	6:00 pm	at Merrimack	#12	J. Thom Lawler Rink • North Andover, Massachusetts	ESPN+	Yegorov	W 5–4	2,647	5–5–1 (3–3–0)
November 15	4:00 pm	at #10 Quinnipiac*	#13	M&T Bank Arena • Hamden, Connecticut	ESPN+	Yegorov	L 2–6	3,625	5–6–1
November 21	7:00 pm	at #12 Northeastern	#18	Matthews Arena • Boston, Massachusetts	ESPN+	Yegorov	L 2–3	4,321	5–7–1 (3–4–0)
November 22	7:00 pm	#12 Northeastern	#18	Agganis Arena • Boston, Massachusetts	ESPN+	Yegorov	W 4–3 ^{OT}	5,913	6–7–1 (4–4–0)
November 29	8:00 pm	vs. #17 Cornell*	#19	Madison Square Garden • Manhattan, New York (Red Hot Hockey)	ESPN+	Yegorov	W 2–1	17,478	7–7–1
December 5	7:00 pm	Vermont	#18	Agganis Arena • Boston, Massachusetts	ESPN+	Yegorov	W 2–1	4,403	8–7–1 (5–4–0)
December 6	6:00 pm	Vermont	#18	Agganis Arena • Boston, Massachusetts	ESPN+	Yegorov	L 2–3	4,305	8–8–1 (5–5–0)
December 13	7:00 pm	at #11 Northeastern	#20	Matthews Arena • Boston, Massachusetts	ESPN+, NESN	Yegorov	W 4–3	4,765	9–8–1 (6–5–0)
January 3	5:00 pm	Simon Fraser*	#19	Agganis Arena • Boston, Massachusetts (Exhibition)	ESPN+	Yegorov	W 8–2	4,079	
January 9	7:00 pm	at Massachusetts	#19	Mullins Center • Amherst, Massachusetts	ESPN+	Yegorov	W 1–0	4,036	10–8–1 (7–5–0)
January 10	6:00 pm	Massachusetts	#19	Agganis Arena • Boston, Massachusetts	ESPN+	Yegorov	L 0–2	5,148	10–9–1 (7–6–0)
January 12	7:00 pm	Harvard*	#20	Bright-Landry Hockey Center • Boston, Massachusetts	ESPN+	Yegorov	W 4–1	2,278	11–9–1
January 16	7:00 pm	Massachusetts Lowell	#20	Agganis Arena • Boston, Massachusetts	ESPN+	Lacroix	L 3–4 ^{OT}	4,813	11–10–1 (7–7–0)
January 17	6:05 pm	at Massachusetts Lowell	#20	Tsongas Center • Lowell, Massachusetts	ESPN+	Yegorov	W 3–0	5,856	12–10–1 (8–7–0)
January 23	7:00 pm	at #11 Providence	#18	Schneider Arena • Providence, Rhode Island	ESPN+	Yegorov	L 3–4	2,808	12–11–1 (8–8–0)
January 24	7:00 pm	#11 Providence	#18	Agganis Arena • Boston, Massachusetts	ESPN+	Yegorov	L 0–4	4,894	12–12–1 (8–9–0)
January 30	7:00 pm	#13 Boston College	#17	Agganis Arena • Boston, Massachusetts (Rivalry)	ESPN+, NESN	Yegorov	L 1–4	6,150	12–13–1 (8–10–0)
Beanpot
February 2	8:00 pm	vs. Northeastern*		TD Garden • Boston, Massachusetts (Beanpot Semifinal)	ESPN+, NESN	Yegorov	T 2–2 ^{SOW}	—	12–13–2
February 6	7:00 pm	#18 Maine		Agganis Arena • Boston, Massachusetts (Rivalry)	ESPN+, NESN+	Yegorov	W 3–2 ^{OT}	4,646	13–13–2 (9–10–0)
February 9	7:30 pm	vs. #14 Boston College*		TD Garden • Boston, Massachusetts (Beanpot Championship, Rivalry)	ESPN+, NESN, TSN3	Yegorov	L 2–6	18,258	13–14–2
February 13	7:00 pm	at New Hampshire		Whittemore Center • Durham, New Hampshire	ESPN+	Yegorov	L 1–4	5,877	13–15–2 (9–11–0)
February 14	6:00 pm	New Hampshire		Agganis Arena • Boston, Massachusetts	ESPN+	Lacroix	W 5–3	4,516	14–15–2 (10–11–0)
February 27	7:00 pm	#10 Boston College		Agganis Arena • Boston, Massachusetts (Rivalry)	ESPN+	Yegorov	W 3–1	5,726	15–15–2 (11–11–0)
February 28	7:00 pm	at #10 Boston College		Conte Forum • Chestnut Hill, Massachusetts (Rivalry)	ESPN+	Yegorov	W 5–1	7,593	16–15–2 (12–11–0)
March 7	6:05 pm	at Massachusetts Lowell		Tsongas Center • Lowell, Massachusetts	ESPN+, NESN+	Yegorov	L 3–4	5,959	16–16–2 (12–12–0)
Hockey East Tournament
March 11	6:30 pm	Vermont*		Agganis Arena • Boston, Massachusetts (Hockey East Opening Round)	ESPN+	Yegorov	W 4–1	1,931	17–16–2
March 14	1:00 pm	at #14 Connecticut*		Agganis Arena • Boston, Massachusetts (Hockey East Quarterfinal)	ESPN+, NESN+	Yegorov	L 3–5	2,513	17–17–2
*Non-conference game. ^{#}Rankings from USCHO.com Poll. All times are in Eastern Time. Source:

== Rankings ==
Poll	Week																											
Poll	Pre	1	2	3	4	5	6	7	8	9	10	11	12	13	14	15	16	17	18	19	20	21	22	23	24	25	26	27 (Final)
USCHO.com	2 (3)	3 (2)	1 (27)	4	5	12	13	18	19	18	20	19	–	19	19	20	18	RV	RV	RV	NR	RV	RV	RV				
USA Hockey	2 (4)	3 (2)	1 (19)	4	5	13	12	19	20	18	20	19	–	19	RV	20	18	RV	RV	RV	NR	NR	RV	NR				

Note: USCHO did not release a poll in week 12.
Note: USA Hockey did not release a poll in week 12.
