= 2025–26 Maine Black Bears men's ice hockey season =

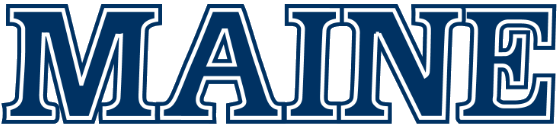
- Conference: Hockey East
- Home ice: Alfond Arena

Record
- Overall: 18–14–3
- Conference: 12–11–1
- Home: 10–7–1
- Road: 5–7–2
- Neutral: 3–0–0

Coaches and captains
- Head coach: Ben Barr
- Assistant coaches: Alfie Michaud; Rick Bennett; John O'Connor
- Captain(s): Thomas Freel; Brandon Holt
- Alternate captain: Frank Djurasevic

The 2025–26 Maine Black Bears Men's ice hockey season was the 50th season of play for the program, the 48th season competing at the Division I level, and the 41st in Hockey East. The Black Bears represented the University of Maine, played their home games at the Alfond Arena and were coached by Ben Barr in his 4th season.

== Departures ==
Player	Position	Nationality	Cause
Luke Antonacci	Defenseman	United States	Transferred to Lake Superior State
Patriks Bērziņš	Goaltender	Latvia	Transferred to St. Cloud State
David Breazeale	Defenseman	United States	Graduation (signed with Wilkes-Barre/Scranton Penguins)
Lynden Breen	Forward	Canada	Graduation (signed with South Carolina Stingrays)
Aidan Carney	Forward	United States	Transferred to Liberty
Jack Dalton	Defenseman	United States	Transferred to Bentley
Liam Lesakowski	Defenseman	United States	Transferred to Sacred Heart
Taylor Makar	Forward	Canada	Graduation (signed with Colorado Avalanche)
Ross Mitton	Forward	United States	Graduation (signed with Bridgeport Islanders)
Brian Morse	Defenseman	United States	Transferred to Ferris State
Nicholas Niemo	Forward	United States	Transferred to Niagara
Nolan Renwick	Forward	Canada	Graduation (signed with Wilkes-Barre/Scranton Penguins)
Harrison Scott	Forward	United States	Graduation (signed with Dallas Stars)

== Recruiting ==
Player	Position	Nationality	Age	Notes
Luke Coughlin	Defenseman	Canada	20	Charlottetown, PEI; selected 191st overall in 2023
Will Gerrior	Forward	Canada	21	Halifax, NS
Brock James	Forward	United States	21	Falmouth, ME
Jérémy Langlois	Defenseman	Canada	22	Sainte-Brigitte-de-Laval, QC; selected 94th overall in 2022
Jaden Lipinski	Forward	United States	20	Scottsdale, AZ; selected 112th overall in 2023
Miguel Marques	Forward	Canada	19	Prince George, BC; selected 87th overall in 2024
Simon Motew	Defenseman	United States	22	Highland Park, IL; transfer from St. Francis Xavier
Nick Peluso	Forward	United States	21	Rochester, NY
Lukas Peterson	Defenseman	United States	19	Waldwick, NJ
Justin Poirier	Forward	Canada	19	Salaberry-de-Valleyfield, QC; selected 156th overall in 2024
Max Scott	Forward	United States	22	San Jose, CA; transfer from Brown
Loïc Usereau	Defenseman	Canada	20	Saint-Michel, QC

== Roster ==
As of August 14, 2025.

No.	Nat.	Player	Class	Pos	Height	Weight	DoB	Hometown	Previous team	NHL rights
2	(United States)	Lukas Peterson	Freshman	D	5' 10" (1.78 m)	168 lb (76 kg)	2006-02-15	Waldwick, New Jersey	Green Bay Gamblers (USHL)	—
4	(United States)	Brandon Holt (C)	Senior	D	5' 11" (1.8 m)	175 lb (79 kg)	2001-04-30	Grand Forks, North Dakota	New Mexico Ice Wolves (NAHL)	—
7	(Canada)	Jeremy Langlois	Freshman	D	6' 1" (1.85 m)	185 lb (84 kg)	2003-09-19	Sainte-Brigitte-de-Laval, Quebec	Rouyn-Noranda Huskies (QMJHL)	ARI, 94th overall 2022
10	(Canada)	Luke Coughlin	Freshman	D	5' 10" (1.78 m)	183 lb (83 kg)	2005-04-11	Charlottetown, Prince Edward Island	Rimouski Oceanic (QMJHL)	FLA, 191st overall 2023
11	(United States)	Charlie Russell	Junior	F	5' 11" (1.8 m)	174 lb (79 kg)	2003-08-21	Houghton, Michigan	Green Bay Gamblers (USHL)	—
12	(United States)	Owen Fowler	Junior	F	5' 9" (1.75 m)	182 lb (83 kg)	2002-06-04	Tewksbury, Massachusetts	Massachusetts Lowell (HEA)	—
14	(United States)	Sully Scholle	Junior	F	5' 10" (1.78 m)	170 lb (77 kg)	2003-03-19	Chaska, Minnesota	New Mexico Ice Wolves (NAHL)	—
15	(United States)	Brandon Chabrier	Senior	D	6' 0" (1.83 m)	178 lb (81 kg)	2002-07-19	Bayville, New York	Madison Capitols (USHL)	—
16	(Canada)	Loïc Userseau	Freshman	D	6' 0" (1.83 m)	176 lb (80 kg)	2004-12-31	Saint-Michel, Quebec	Chicoutimi Sagueneens (QMJHL)	—
18	(United States)	Simon Motew	Freshman	D	6' 0" (1.83 m)	183 lb (83 kg)	2003-03-31	Highland Park, Illinois	St. Francis Xavier (AUS)	—
20	(Canada)	Josh Nadeau	Sophomore	F	5' 8" (1.73 m)	158 lb (72 kg)	2003-10-22	Saint-François-de-Madawaska, New Brunswick	Penticton Vees (BCHL)	—
21	(United States)	Nick Peluso	Freshman	F	5' 8" (1.73 m)	174 lb (79 kg)	2004-02-14	Rochester, New York	Brooks Bandits (BCHL)	—
22	(United States)	Will Gerrior	Freshman	F	5' 10" (1.78 m)	179 lb (81 kg)	2004-03-02	Halifax, Nova Scotia	Ottawa 67's (OHL)	—
23	(Canada)	Grayson Arnott	Senior	D	5' 9" (1.75 m)	152 lb (69 kg)	2001-06-14	Toronto, Ontario	Penticton Vees (BCHL)	—
24	(United States)	Brock James	Freshman	F	6' 2" (1.88 m)	201 lb (91 kg)	2004-06-01	Falmouth, Maine	Sioux Falls Stampede (USHL)	—
26	(Scotland)	Thomas Freel (C)	Senior	F	5' 11" (1.8 m)	180 lb (82 kg)	2001-06-26	Aberdeen, Scotland	Ottawa Jr. Senators (CCHL)	—
27	(United States)	Max Scott	Sophomore	F	6' 0" (1.83 m)	185 lb (84 kg)	2002-10-11	San Jose, California	Brown (ECAC)	—
28	(United States)	Anthony Calafiore	Junior	F	5' 9" (1.75 m)	170 lb (77 kg)	2002-04-06	Staten Island, New York	New Jersey Titans (NAHL)	—
29	(Canada)	Thomas Pichette	Sophomore	F	5' 11" (1.8 m)	181 lb (82 kg)	2003-07-03	Maskinongé, Quebec	Penticton Vees (USHL)	—
30	(Sweden)	Albin Boija	Junior	G	6' 1" (1.85 m)	181 lb (82 kg)	2003-08-20	Sundsvall, Sweden	Växjö J20 (J20 Nationell)	—
32	(United States)	Mathis Rousseau	Freshman	G	5' 11" (1.8 m)	174 lb (79 kg)	2004-09-10	Montréal, Quebec	Moncton Wildcats (QMJHL)	—
34	(Canada)	Bodie Nobes	Junior	D	5' 10" (1.78 m)	185 lb (84 kg)	2003-07-18	Sainte-Thérèse, Quebec	Green Bay Gamblers (USHL)	—
35	(Canada)	Gage Stewart	Sophomore	G	6' 0" (1.83 m)	190 lb (86 kg)	2003-06-17	Marathon, Ontario	Fort McMurray Oil Barons (AJHL)	—
38	(Finland)	Oskar Komarov	Sophomore	F	5' 11" (1.8 m)	183 lb (83 kg)	2003-10-06	Uusikaarlepyy, Finland	Langley Rivermen (BCHL)	—
41	(United States)	Jaden Lipinski	Freshman	F	6' 4" (1.93 m)	209 lb (95 kg)	2004-12-02	Scottsdale, Arizona	Vancouver Giants (WHL)	CGY, 112th overall 2023
43	(Canada)	Miguel Marques	Freshman	F	5' 11" (1.8 m)	185 lb (84 kg)	2006-03-08	Prince George, British Columbia	Lethbridge Hurricanes (WHL)	NSH, 87th overall 2024
44	(United States)	Frank Djurasevic (A)	Junior	D	6' 2" (1.88 m)	198 lb (90 kg)	2002-03-09	New Rochelle, New York	Merrimack (HEA)	—
93	(Canada)	Justin Poirier	Freshman	F	5' 8" (1.73 m)	185 lb (84 kg)	2006-09-04	Salaberry-de-Valleyfield, Quebec	Baie-Comeau Drakkar (QMJHL)	CAR, 156th overall 2024

== Standings ==
2025–26 Hockey East Standings
	Conference record										Overall record					
	GP	W	L	T	OTW	OTL	SW	PTS	GF	GA	GP	W	L	T	GF	GA
#9 Providence †	24	18	5	1	2	1	0	54	86	46	36	23	11	2	120	82
#16 Massachusetts	24	14	9	1	2	1	1	43	63	53	36	22	13	1	101	83
#13 Connecticut	24	12	9	3	1	1	2	41	73	59	38	20	13	5	116	90
#19 Boston College	24	13	11	0	1	1	2	39	69	59	36	20	15	1	116	92
Maine	24	12	11	1	3	2	0	36	76	79	35	18	14	3	116	96
Boston University	24	12	12	0	3	2	0	35	69	74	36	17	17	2	105	110
Northeastern	24	11	13	0	1	3	0	35	67	62	36	17	18	1	98	91
#15 Merrimack *	24	10	12	2	0	1	1	34	68	75	39	21	16	2	121	110
Massachusetts Lowell	24	9	15	0	1	2	0	28	66	80	35	13	22	0	91	114
New Hampshire	24	8	15	1	0	0	1	26	41	73	35	14	20	1	68	105
Vermont	24	8	15	1	0	0	0	25	55	83	35	13	21	1	73	115
Championship: March 21, 2026 † indicates regular season champion * indicates conference tournament champion (Lamoriello Trophy); Rankings: USCHO Division I Men's Poll; updated April 15, 2026

== Schedule and results ==
Date	Time	Opponent^{#}	Rank^{#}	Site	TV	Decision	Result	Attendance	Record
Exhibition
October 3	7:00 pm	vs. New Hampshire*	#7	Sidney J. Watson Arena • Brunswick, Maine (Exhibition, Rivalry)		Rousseau	T 2–2 ^{OT}	2,000	
Regular Season
October 10	7:00 pm	Holy Cross*	#6	Alfond Arena • Orono, Maine	ESPN+	Boija	W 5–2	4,980	1–0–0
October 11	7:00 pm	Holy Cross*	#6	Alfond Arena • Orono, Maine	ESPN+	Boija	W 6–0	4,980	2–0–0
October 17	7:00 pm	at #10 Quinnipiac*	#7	M&T Bank Arena • Hamden, Connecticut	ESPN+, NESN	Boija	T 4–4 ^{OT}	3,625	2–0–1
October 18	4:00 pm	at #10 Quinnipiac*	#7	M&T Bank Arena • Hamden, Connecticut	ESPN+	Rousseau	L 0–4	3,625	2–1–1
October 24	7:00 pm	Colgate*	#10	Alfond Arena • Orono, Maine	ESPN+	Boija	L 2–3	4,980	2–2–1
October 25	7:00 pm	Colgate*	#10	Alfond Arena • Orono, Maine	ESPN+	Boija	W 3–2 ^{OT}	4,980	3–2–1
October 31	7:00 pm	#5 Boston University	#12	Alfond Arena • Orono, Maine (Rivalry)	ESPN+	Boija	W 5–4 ^{OT}	4,980	4–2–1 (1–0–0)
November 1	7:30 pm	#5 Boston University	#12	Alfond Arena • Orono, Maine (Rivalry)	ESPN+, NESN	Rousseau	W 8–5	4,980	5–2–1 (2–0–0)
November 6	7:00 pm	at #13 Massachusetts	#6	Mullins Center • Amherst, Massachusetts	ESPN+	Boija	W 6–2	3,625	6–2–1 (3–0–0)
November 7	7:00 pm	at #13 Massachusetts	#6	Mullins Center • Amherst, Massachusetts	ESPN+, NESN	Boija	L 0–4	4,330	6–3–1 (3–1–0)
November 14	7:00 pm	Vermont	#8	Alfond Arena • Orono, Maine	ESPN+	Boija	W 7–0	4,980	7–3–1 (4–1–0)
November 15	7:30 pm	Vermont	#8	Alfond Arena • Orono, Maine	ESPN+	Boija	L 1–2	4,980	7–4–1 (4–2–0)
November 21	7:00 pm	at #15 Boston College	#10	Conte Forum • Chestnut Hill, Massachusetts	ESPN+, NESN	Boija	L 3–7	7,884	7–5–1 (4–3–0)
November 22	7:00 pm	at #15 Boston College	#10	Conte Forum • Chestnut Hill, Massachusetts	ESPN+	Rousseau	W 3–0	7,046	8–5–1 (5–3–0)
December 5	7:00 pm	New Hampshire	#11	Alfond Arena • Orono, Maine (Rivalry)	ESPN+, NESN	Rousseau	L 0–1	4,980	8–6–1 (5–4–0)
December 6	7:00 pm	New Hampshire	#11	Alfond Arena • Orono, Maine (Rivalry)	ESPN+	Boija	L 2–3	4,980	8–7–1 (5–5–0)
December 10	7:00 pm	vs. Massachusetts Lowell	#15	Cross Insurance Arena • Portland, Maine	ESPN+	Rousseau	W 5–4 ^{OT}	5,732	9–7–1 (6–5–0)
December 13	6:30 pm	Lindenwood*	#15	Alfond Arena • Orono, Maine	ESPN+	Boija	W 5–0	4,980	10–7–1
December 14	4:00 pm	Lindenwood*	#15	Alfond Arena • Orono, Maine	ESPN+	Rousseau	W 7–2	4,842	11–7–1
January 2	9:00 pm	at #6 Denver*	#15	Magness Arena • Denver, Colorado		Boija	W 5–2	6,329	12–7–1
January 3	8:00 pm	at #6 Denver*	#15	Magness Arena • Denver, Colorado		Boija	T 3–3	6,556	12–7–2
January 9	7:00 pm	at #18 Providence	#12	Schneider Arena • Providence, Rhode Island	ESPN+, NESN	Boija	L 1–6	2,510	12–8–2 (6–6–0)
January 10	6:00 pm	at #18 Providence	#12	Schneider Arena • Providence, Rhode Island	ESPN+	Rousseau	L 0–3	2,776	12–9–2 (6–7–0)
January 23	7:15 pm	at Massachusetts Lowell	#17	Tsongas Center • Lowell, Massachusetts	ESPN+, NESN	Boija	W 2–0	5,402	13–9–2 (7–7–0)
January 24	6:05 pm	Massachusetts Lowell	#17	Tsongas Center • Lowell, Massachusetts	ESPN+	Boija	W 6–5 ^{OT}	5,567	14–9–2 (8–7–0)
January 31	7:00 pm	#9 Providence	#17	Alfond Arena • Orono, Maine	ESPN+	Rousseau	L 2–3 ^{OT}	4,980	14–10–2 (8–8–0)
February 6	7:00 pm	at Boston University	#18	Agganis Arena • Boston, Massachusetts (Rivalry)	ESPN+	Boija	L 2–3 ^{OT}	4,646	14–11–2 (8–9–0)
February 13	7:00 pm	#11 Connecticut		Alfond Arena • Orono, Maine	ESPN+	Rousseau	L 0–2	4,980	14–12–2 (8–10–0)
February 14	7:00 pm	#11 Connecticut		Alfond Arena • Orono, Maine	ESPN+	Boija	T 3–3 ^{SOL}	4,900	14–12–3 (8–10–1)
February 20	7:00 pm	Merrimack		Alfond Arena • Orono, Maine	ESPN+	Rousseau	W 5–3	4,980	15–12–3 (9–10–1)
February 21	7:00 pm	Merrimack		Alfond Arena • Orono, Maine	ESPN+	Rousseau	W 5–2	4,980	16–12–3 (10–10–1)
February 27	7:00 PM	vs. Northeastern	#20	Cross Insurance Arena • Portland, Maine¹	ESPN+	Rousseau	W 4–0	5,621	17–12–3 (11–10–1)
February 28	7:00 PM	vs. Northeastern	#20	Tsongas Center • Lowell, Massachusetts¹	ESPN+	Rousseau	W 3–2	985	18–12–3 (12–10–1)
March 7	7:00 pm	at Vermont	#18	Gutterson Fieldhouse • Burlington, Vermont	ESPN+	Rousseau	L 3–5	2,769	18–13–3 (12–11–1)
Hockey East Tournament
March 13	7:00 pm	#17 Boston College*		Conte Forum • Chestnut Hill, Massachusetts (Hockey East Quarterfinal)	ESPN+	Rousseau	L 0–5	5,695	18–14–3
*Non-conference game. ^{#}Rankings from USCHO.com Poll. All times are in Eastern Time. Source:

¹ Due to the demolition and replacement of Matthews Arena, closing in December 2025, Northeastern home games are being played at various sites around New England while they await the construction of their new arena.

== Rankings ==
Poll	Week																											
Poll	Pre	1	2	3	4	5	6	7	8	9	10	11	12	13	14	15	16	17	18	19	20	21	22	23	24	25	26	27 (Final)
USCHO.com	7	6	7 (3)	10	12	6	8	10	10	11	15	14	–	15	12	16	17	17	18	RV	RV	20	18	RV	RV			
USA Hockey	8т	8	7 (1)	10	12	6	10	11	11	12	18	15	–	18	14	16	17	17	18	RV	RV	RV	18	RV	RV			

Note: USCHO did not release a poll in week 12.
Note: USA Hockey did not release a poll in week 12.
