= 2025–26 Merrimack Warriors men's ice hockey season =

Hockey East Tournament, Champion NCAA Tournament, Regional Semifinals
- Conference: Hockey East
- Home ice: J. Thom Lawler Rink

Rankings
- USCHO: #16
- USA Hockey: #16

Record
- Overall: 21–16–2
- Conference: 10–12–2
- Home: 13–5–1
- Road: 6–10–1
- Neutral: 2–1–0

Coaches and captains
- Head coach: Scott Borek
- Assistant coaches: Dan Jewell; Ryan Durocher
- Captain(s): Caelan Fitzpatrick; Mark Hillier
- Alternate captain(s): Ty Daneault; Seamus Powell

The 2025–26 Merrimack Warriors Men's ice hockey season was the 70th season of play for the program, the 37th at the Division I level, and the 37th in Hockey East. The Warriors represented Merrimack College in the 2025–26 NCAA Division I men's ice hockey season, played their home games at the J. Thom Lawler Rink and were coached by Scott Borek, in his 8th season.

During the season the Warriors won their first ever Hockey East Tournament championship and made their fourth NCAA DI tournament appearance.

== Season ==
The Warriors started off the season 5-10, however they went on to finish the regular season strong going 12-5-2 and finished 10-12-2 in hockey east play.

During the 2026 Hockey East men's tournament the Warriors knocked off UMass Lowell 5-3 in the opening round and then beat the #1 seed Providence College 3-2 in overtime to reach the semifinals at the TD Garden. The Warriors then beat UMass 2-0 in the semifinals to make their third Hockey East championship game appearance. The Warriors would defeat UConn in the championship game 2-1. Winning their first ever hockey east tournament title along with becoming the first ever #8 seed to do so.

Merrimack goalie Max Ludgren was named tournament MVP after having a shutout in the semifinals vs. UMass and making 49 saves on 50 shots in the championship game.

The Warriors were defeated by North Dakota in the opening round of the 2026 NCAA Division I men's ice hockey tournament 3-0.

== Departures ==
Player	Position	Nationality	Cause
Zach Bookman	Defenseman	United States	Transferred to Western Michigan
Ethan Bono	Forward	Canada	Transferred to Rensselaer
Michael Citara	Forward	United States	Graduate transfer to Alaska
Colby Enns	Defenseman	United States	Graduation (signed with Iowa Heartlanders)
Trevor Griebel	Defenseman/Forward	United States	Transferred to Long Island
Jordan Hughesman	Forward	Canada	Left program (retired)
Josef Myšák	Defenseman	Czech Republic	Graduation (signed with HC Energie Karlovy Vary)
Harrison Roy	Forward	United States	Graduation (signed with Deggendorfer SC)
David Sacco	Forward	United States	Transferred to Vermont
Antonio Venuto	Forward	United States	Graduation (signed with Kalamazoo Wings)
Hunter Wallace	Forward	Canada	Transferred to Niagara
Max Wattvil	Defenseman	Sweden	Transferred to Robert Morris
Tyler Young	Forward	United States	Transferred to North Dakota
Ivan Zivlak	Defenseman	Sweden	Graduation (signed with IF Troja-Ljungby)

== Recruiting ==
Player	Position	Nationality	Age	Notes
Daniel Astapovich	Forward	United States	20	Birmingham, MI
Trent Ballentyne	Defenseman	Canada	21	London, ON
Riley Bassen	Forward	United States	20	Frisco, TX
Ethan Beyer	Defenseman	United States	21	Philadelphia, PA
Matthew Campbell	Defenseman	Canada	22	North Vancouver, BC; transfer from Michigan Tech
Nolan Flamand	Forward	Canada	21	Saskatoon, SK
Joey Henneberry	Forward	Canada	20	Halifax, NS
Trevor Hoskin	Forward	Canada	21	Belleville, ON; transfer from Niagara; selected 106th overall in 2024
Parker Lalonde	Forward	Canada	21	Aberdeen, SK
Hunter Mayo	Defenseman	Canada	21	Martensville, SK
Filip Nordberg	Defenseman	Sweden	21	Stockholm, SWE; selected 64th overall in 2022
Austin Oravetz	Defenseman	United States	22	Canonsburg, PA; transfer from Michigan State
Ben Yurchuk	Forward	Canada	20	Montréal, QC

== Roster ==
As of September 13, 2025.

No.	Nat.	Player	Class	Pos	Height	Weight	DoB	Hometown	Previous team	NHL rights
2	(Canada)	Nathan King	Sophomore	D	6' 2" (1.88 m)	192 lb (87 kg)	2004-06-11	Victoria, British Columbia	Victoria Grizzlies (BCHL)	—
3	(Sweden)	Filip Nordberg	Freshman	D	6' 5" (1.96 m)	212 lb (96 kg)	2004-03-05	Stockholm, Sweden	Sioux Falls Stampede (USHL)	OTT, 64th overall 2022
4	(United States)	Seamus Powell (A)	Junior	D	6' 0" (1.83 m)	176 lb (80 kg)	2004-04-26	Marcellus, New York	Dubuque Fighting Saints (USHL)	—
6	(United States)	Daniel Astapovich	Freshman	D	6' 3" (1.91 m)	198 lb (90 kg)	2005-03-13	Birmingham, Michigan	Cedar Rapids RoughRiders (USHL)	—
7	(United States)	Ethan Beyer	Freshman	D	5' 11" (1.8 m)	183 lb (83 kg)	2004-03-18	Philadelphia, Pennsylvania	Brooks Bandits (BCHL)	—
8	(Canada)	Hunter Mayo	Freshman	D	6' 1" (1.85 m)	196 lb (89 kg)	2004-05-07	Martensville, Saskatchewan	Swift Current Broncos (WHL)	—
9	(Canada)	Jack Richard	Sophomore (RS)	F	6' 4" (1.93 m)	180 lb (82 kg)	2002-12-13	Stoney Creek, Ontario	Niagara (AHA)	—
10	(Canada)	Trevor Hoskin	Sophomore	F	6' 1" (1.85 m)	174 lb (79 kg)	2004-05-18	Belleville, Ontario	Niagara (AHA)	CGY, 106th overall 2024
11	(United States)	Nick Pierre	Sophomore	F	5' 9" (1.75 m)	165 lb (75 kg)	2004-04-09	Cottage Grove, Minnesota	Omaha Lancers (USHL)	—
12	(Canada)	Parker Lalonde	Freshman	F	6' 1" (1.85 m)	176 lb (80 kg)	2004-01-22	Aberdeen, Saskatchewan	Brooks Bandits (BCHL)	—
13	(Canada)	Joey Henneberry	Freshman	F	6' 2" (1.88 m)	192 lb (87 kg)	2004-12-20	Halifax, Nova Scotia	Cape Breton Eagles (QMJHL)	—
14	(United States)	Riley Bassen	Freshman	F	5' 11" (1.8 m)	172 lb (78 kg)	2005-04-26	Frisco, Texas	Fargo Force (USHL)	—
15	(Canada)	Vann Yuhas	Freshman	F	6' 0" (1.83 m)	174 lb (79 kg)	2004-02-20	Medicine Hat, Alberta	Drumheller Dragons (AJHL)	—
16	(Canada)	Ty Daneault (A)	Junior	F	5' 11" (1.8 m)	192 lb (87 kg)	2004-12-20	Red Deer, Alberta	Drumheller Dragons (AJHL)	—
17	(Canada)	Cam Kungle	Junior	D	6' 3" (1.91 m)	202 lb (92 kg)	2002-03-28	Red Deer, Alberta	Lake Superior State (CCHA)	—
19	(Canada)	Mark Hillier (C)	Graduate	F	6' 1" (1.85 m)	180 lb (82 kg)	2002-03-18	Labrador City, Newfoundland and Labrador	Summerside Western Capitals (MHL)	—
20	(Canada)	Nolan Flamand	Freshman	F	5' 9" (1.75 m)	181 lb (82 kg)	2004-01-12	Saskatoon, Saskatchewan	Brandon Wheat Kings (WHL)	—
21	(United States)	Caden Cranston	Sophomore	F	5' 10" (1.78 m)	174 lb (79 kg)	2004-03-23	Rochester, New York	Surrey Eagles (BCHL)	—
22	(Canada)	Trent Ballantyne	Freshman	D	6' 3" (1.91 m)	183 lb (83 kg)	2004-02-29	London, Ontario	Prince George Spruce Kings (BCHL)	—
24	(United States)	Austin Oravetz	Junior	D	5' 9" (1.75 m)	192 lb (87 kg)	2003-09-26	Canonsburg, Pennsylvania	Michigan State (Big Ten)	—
25	(United States)	Luke Weilandt	Junior	F	5' 10" (1.78 m)	181 lb (82 kg)	2002-04-04	Northbrook, Illinois	Wenatchee Wild (BCHL)	—
26	(United States)	Michael Emerson	Junior	F	6' 1" (1.85 m)	190 lb (86 kg)	2003-11-26	Yorktown Heights, New York	Chicago Steel (USHL)	CAR, 190th overall 2023
27	(Canada)	Ben Yurchuk	Freshman	F	5' 8" (1.73 m)	170 lb (77 kg)	2005-02-19	Montréal, Quebec	Chicago Steel (USHL)	—
28	(United States)	Ryan O'Connell	Sophomore	F	5' 10" (1.78 m)	187 lb (85 kg)	2003-10-23	Moorestown, New Jersey	Cedar Rapids RoughRiders (USHL)	—
29	(Canada)	Caelan Fitzpatrick (C)	Sophomore	F	5' 11" (1.8 m)	185 lb (84 kg)	2003-06-17	Moose Jaw, Saskatchewan	Brooks Bandits (BCHL)	—
30	(Sweden)	Nils Wallström	Junior	G	6' 3" (1.91 m)	185 lb (84 kg)	2003-10-15	Skellefteå, Sweden	American International (AHA)	—
31	(United States)	Ryan Keyes	Sophomore	G	6' 2" (1.88 m)	172 lb (78 kg)	2003-04-25	Fairbanks, Alaska	South Shore Kings (NCDC)	—
47	(Sweden)	Max Lundgren	Sophomore	G	6' 5" (1.96 m)	229 lb (104 kg)	2002-04-03	Ängelholm, Sweden	Des Moines Buccaneers (USHL)	—

== Standings ==
2025–26 Hockey East Standings
	Conference record										Overall record					
	GP	W	L	T	OTW	OTL	SW	PTS	GF	GA	GP	W	L	T	GF	GA
#9 Providence †	24	18	5	1	2	1	0	54	86	46	36	23	11	2	120	82
#16 Massachusetts	24	14	9	1	2	1	1	43	63	53	36	22	13	1	101	83
#13 Connecticut	24	12	9	3	1	1	2	41	73	59	38	20	13	5	116	90
#19 Boston College	24	13	11	0	1	1	2	39	69	59	36	20	15	1	116	92
Maine	24	12	11	1	3	2	0	36	76	79	35	18	14	3	116	96
Boston University	24	12	12	0	3	2	0	35	69	74	36	17	17	2	105	110
Northeastern	24	11	13	0	1	3	0	35	67	62	36	17	18	1	98	91
#15 Merrimack *	24	10	12	2	0	1	1	34	68	75	39	21	16	2	121	110
Massachusetts Lowell	24	9	15	0	1	2	0	28	66	80	35	13	22	0	91	114
New Hampshire	24	8	15	1	0	0	1	26	41	73	35	14	20	1	68	105
Vermont	24	8	15	1	0	0	0	25	55	83	35	13	21	1	73	115
Championship: March 21, 2026 † indicates regular season champion * indicates conference tournament champion (Lamoriello Trophy); Rankings: USCHO Division I Men's Poll; updated April 15, 2026

== Schedule and results ==
Date	Time	Opponent^{#}	Rank^{#}	Site	TV	Decision	Result	Attendance	Record
Regular season
October 3	7:15 pm	at Massachusetts Lowell		Tsongas Center • Lowell, Massachusetts	ESPN+	Lundgren	L 0–4	6,804	0–1–0 (0–1–0)
October 4	5:00 pm	at Sacred Heart*		Martire Family Arena • Fairfield, Connecticut (Exhibition)	FloHockey	Wallström	W 3–0	523	
October 10	7:00 pm	Massachusetts Lowell		J. Thom Lawler Rink • North Andover, Massachusetts	ESPN+	Lundgren	W 4–1	1,858	1–1–0 (1–1–0)
October 18	6:00 pm	New Hampshire		J. Thom Lawler Rink • North Andover, Massachusetts	ESPN+	Lundgren	W 5–1	2,411	2–1–0 (2–1–0)
October 24	7:00 pm	#6 Quinnipiac		J. Thom Lawler Rink • North Andover, Massachusetts	ESPN+	Lundgren	W 4–1	2,478	3–1–0
October 25	6:00 pm	Long Island*		J. Thom Lawler Rink • North Andover, Massachusetts	FloHockey	Lundgren	L 2–5	1,787	3–2–0
November 1	7:00 pm	at #9 Connecticut		Toscano Family Ice Forum • Storrs, Connecticut	ESPN+	Lundgren	L 1–5	2,397	3–3–0 (2–2–0)
November 7	7:00 pm	at #12 Boston University		Agganis Arena • Boston, Massachusetts	ESPN+	Lundgren	L 2–3 ^{OT}	5,453	3–4–0 (2–3–0)
November 8	6:00 pm	#12 Boston University		J. Thom Lawler Rink • North Andover, Massachusetts	ESPN+	Lundgren	L 4–5	2,647	3–5–0 (2–4–0)
November 14	7:00 pm	at #15 Providence		Schneider Arena • Providence, Rhode Island	ESPN+	Lundgren	L 2–4	2,914	3–6–0 (2–5–0)
November 15	6:00 pm	#15 Providence		J. Thom Lawler Rink • North Andover, Massachusetts	ESPN+	Lundgren	W 3–2	2,496	4–6–0 (3–5–0)
November 21	7:00 pm	at Long Island*		Northwell Health Ice Center • East Meadow, New York	FloHockey	Lundgren	W 6–2	600	5–6–0
November 26	2:00 pm	Notre Dame*		J. Thom Lawler Rink • North Andover, Massachusetts	ESPN+	Lundgren	L 4–5	2,647	5–7–0
November 29	4:00 pm	at #13 Dartmouth*		Thompson Arena • Hanover, New Hampshire	ESPN+	Lundgren	L 0–1	2,512	5–8–0
December 5	7:00 pm	#14 Connecticut		J. Thom Lawler Rink • North Andover, Massachusetts	ESPN+	Lundgren	L 0–3	1,978	5–9–0 (3–6–0)
December 6	4:00 pm	at #14 Connecticut		Toscano Family Ice Forum • Storrs, Connecticut	ESPN+	Lundgren	L 2–5	2,439	5–10–0 (3–7–0)
December 12	7:00 pm	Yale*		J. Thom Lawler Rink • North Andover, Massachusetts	ESPN+	Lundgren	W 4–1	2,196	6–10–0
December 13	6:00 pm	Long Island*		J. Thom Lawler Rink • North Andover, Massachusetts	ESPN+	Lundgren	W 4–2	1,738	7–10–0
December 29	6:00 pm	at Vermont		Gutterson Fieldhouse • Burlington, Vermont	ESPN+	Lundgren	W 5–4	2,565	8–10–0 (4–7–0)
January 3	7:00 pm	at Brown*		Meehan Auditorium • Providence, Rhode Island	ESPN+	Lundgren	W 3–2	538	9–10–0
January 10	7:00 pm	at Holy Cross*		Hart Center • Worcester, Massachusetts	FloHockey, NESN+	Lundgren	W 5–2	933	10–10–0
January 16	7:00 pm	Massachusetts		J. Thom Lawler Rink • North Andover, Massachusetts	ESPN+	Lundgren	L 2–4	2,647	10–11–0 (4–8–0)
January 17	7:00 pm	at Massachusetts		Mullins Center • Amherst, Massachusetts	ESPN+	Lundgren	L 1–3	4,116	10–12–0 (4–9–0)
January 23	7:00 pm	Northeastern		J. Thom Lawler Rink • North Andover, Massachusetts	ESPN+	Lundgren	W 4–1	1,789	11–12–0 (5–9–0)
January 25	4:00 pm	Northeastern		J. Thom Lawler Rink • North Andover, Massachusetts	ESPN+	Lundgren	W 3–1	2,446	12–12–0 (6–9–0)
January 30	7:00 pm	New Hampshire		J. Thom Lawler Rink • North Andover, Massachusetts	ESPN+	Lundgren	W 2–1	2,647	13–12–0 (7–9–0)
January 31	7:00 pm	at New Hampshire		Whittemore Center • Durham, New Hampshire	ESPN+	Lundgren	T 3–3 ^{SOL}	5,129	13–12–1 (7–9–1)
February 3	7:00 pm	at Stonehill*		Warrior Ice Arena • Boston, Massachusetts	NEC Front Row	Lundgren	W 9–5	208	14–12–1
February 13	7:00 pm	#14 Boston College		J. Thom Lawler Rink • North Andover, Massachusetts	ESPN+	Lundgren	W 4–2	2,853	15–12–1 (8–9–1)
February 14	7:00 pm	at #14 Boston College		Conte Forum • Chestnut Hill, Massachusetts	ESPN+	Lundgren	L 2–4	5,383	15–13–1 (8–10–1)
February 20	7:00 pm	at Maine		Alfond Arena • Orono, Maine	ESPN+	Lundgren	L 3–5	4,980	15–14–1 (8–11–1)
February 21	7:00 pm	at Maine		Alfond Arena • Orono, Maine	ESPN+	Lundgren	L 2–5	4,980	15–15–1 (8–12–1)
February 27	7:00 pm	Vermont		J. Thom Lawler Rink • North Andover, Massachusetts	ESPN+	Lundgren	W 5–2	2,078	16–15–1 (9–12–1)
February 28	7:00 pm	Vermont		J. Thom Lawler Rink • North Andover, Massachusetts	ESPN+	Lundgren	T 4–4 ^{OT}	2,378	16–15–2 (9–12–2)
March 6	7:00 pm	Massachusetts Lowell		J. Thom Lawler Rink • North Andover, Massachusetts	ESPN+	Lundgren	W 5–3	1,986	17–15–2 (10–12–2)
Hockey East Tournament
March 11	7:00 pm	Massachusetts Lowell*		J. Thom Lawler Rink • North Andover, Massachusetts (Hockey East Opening Round)	ESPN+, NESN+	Lundgren	W 5–3	1,992	18–15–2
March 14	7:00 pm	at #5 Providence*		Schneider Arena • Providence, Rhode Island (Hockey East Quarterfinal)	ESPN+, NESN+	Lundgren	W 3–2 ^{OT}	2,798	19–15–2
March 20	4:00 pm	vs. #14 Massachusetts*		TD Garden • Boston, Massachusetts (Hockey East Semifinal)	ESPN+, NESN+	Lundgren	W 2–0	15,573	20–15–2
March 21	7:00 pm	vs. #13 Connecticut*		TD Garden • Boston, Massachusetts (Hockey East Championship)	ESPN+, NESN	Lundgren	W 2–1	15,759	21–15–2
NCAA Tournament
March 26	8:30 pm	vs. #2 North Dakota*	#16	Denny Sanford PREMIER Center • Sioux Falls, South Dakota (Regional Semifinal)	ESPN2	Lundgren	L 0–3	5,114	21–16–2
*Non-conference game. ^{#}Rankings from USCHO.com Poll. All times are in Eastern Time. Source:

== Rankings ==
Poll	Week																											
Poll	Pre	1	2	3	4	5	6	7	8	9	10	11	12	13	14	15	16	17	18	19	20	21	22	23	24	25	26	27 (Final)
USCHO.com	NR	NR	NR	NR	RV	NR	NR	NR	NR	NR	NR	NR	–	NR	NR	RV	NR	NR	NR	NR	RV	NR	NR	NR	RV	16		
USA Hockey	NR	NR	NR	NR	NR	NR	NR	NR	NR	NR	NR	NR	–	NR	NR	RV	NR	NR	NR	NR	NR	NR	NR	NR	RV	16		

Note: USCHO did not release a poll in week 12.
Note: USA Hockey did not release a poll in week 12.
