= Stillwater Lake, Nova Scotia =

Community in Nova Scotia, Canada

Coordinates: 44°42′26.1″N 63°50′57.8″W

Stillwater Lake in Nova Scotia

Stillwater Lake is a residential community of the Halifax Regional Municipality in the Canadian province of Nova Scotia. As of the Canada 2021 Census, Stillwater Lake has a population of 3,379, decrease of 2.0% from five years prior.
