= M&T Bank Center =

Indoor ice hockey rink in Schenectady, New York

- Interactive map of M&T Bank Center
- Location: 101 Harborside Drive; Schenectady, New York
- Coordinates: 42°49′32″N 73°56′06″W
- Capacity: 2,200 (ice hockey); 3,600 (other events)

Construction
- Opened: August 14, 2025
- Cost: $55 million

Tenants
- Union Garnet Chargers (men's and women's hockey) (2025–); NY Phoenix (94x50) (2026–)

Website
- mandtbankcenter.com

The M&T Bank Center is a multi-purpose venue in Schenectady, New York. Opened in August 2025, the venue is located near Rivers Casino and is home to Union College hockey games and the NY Phoenix of 94x50 League.

== Event Venue and Community Use ==
In addition to serving as the home rink for Union College's men's and women's ice hockey programs, the M&T Bank Center is designed as a multipurpose event venue intended to support a wide range of community and regional events. The facility is expected to host concerts, family shows, conventions and other entertainment programming. Its location in the Mohawk Harbor district, adjacent to the Rivers Casino and several new residential and commercial developments, positions the venue as a hub for both college athletics and broader public events. The inclusion of flexible seating, modern amenities, and event infrastructure reflects its dual role as a collegiate sports facility and regional entertainment venue.

== Union Hockey History ==
Since Union restarted its varsity ice hockey program in 1975, the team had one home: Achilles Rink. After more than 40 years of use, the building was in need of a refurbishment in order to keep pace with other programs across the country. The school undertook a study on the improvements necessary and estimated that the cost would be more than $20 million. With the sizable price tag, the college decided to instead build a new rink. Plans for the new facility began in the spring of 2022 and the school worked with the Schenectady Metroplex Development Authority to determine the best approach. Almost three years later, plans were finalized for the new rink. The new building, which was operating under a working name as the 'Mohawk Harbor Event Center' would cost an estimated $50 million to build. To fund the project, Union College agreed to pay $20 million over a 25-year period as the primary tenant for the arena. A further $10 million was secured by State Assemblyman Angelo Santabarbara, $5 million came from the county legislature, $2.5 million from the Schenectady city council and $1 million from trustee Neil Golub. The rink is to be built near College Park Hall, on the northwest corner of campus, in the Mohawk Harbor district.

== New York Phoenix ==
The New York Phoenix of 94x50 League moved into M&T Bank Center in 2026 after playing their inaugural season at Schenectady Armory.
