= Mayor (disambiguation) =

A mayor is the highest-ranking official in a municipal government such as that of a city or a town.

Mayor may also refer to:

== Geography ==
- Lord Mayor Bay, an Arctic waterway in Kitikmeot Region, Nunavut, Canada
- Mayor Buratovich, a town in Buenos Aires Province, Argentina
- Mayor Island / Tūhua, a dormant shield volcano located off the Bay of Plenty coast of New Zealand's North Island
- Mayor Otaño, a town in the Itapúa department of Paraguay
- Mayor Square, in the Docklands area of Dublin

== Offices, ranks, and titles ==
- Mayor (France), maire
- Mayor (Netherlands), burgemeester
- Mayor, (Майор), the lowest field officer rank in Russia, equivalent to major in most NATO armed forces
- Deputy mayor
- Lord Mayor, the mayor of a major city in the United Kingdom and some Commonwealth countries
  - Lord Mayor's Day, an annual pageant in London
- Mayor of the Palace, the manager of the household of the Frankish kings
- Mayors in Brazil
- Mayors in Northern Ireland
- Mayors in Wales
- Mock mayor, a British folk tradition
  - Mayor of Ock Street, a Mock Mayor tradition in Abingdon, Oxfordshire

== People ==
=== People with the name ===
- Mayor (surname)
- Mayor Guillén de Guzmán (1205-1262), Spanish aristocrat
- Máyor (footballer) (born 1984), Spanish footballer
- Mayor McCA (AKA Christian Anderson Smith, active from 1996), Canadian musician

== Arts, entertainment, and media ==
=== Fictional mayors ===
- Mayor (Buffy the Vampire Slayer), a character in the TV series
- Mayor of Mega-City One, a fictional office in the Judge Dredd comic strip in 2000 AD
- Mayor of the Shire, the sole elected official of the Shire in the literary works of J. R. R. Tolkien
- Mayor Quimby, a recurring character from the animated television series The Simpsons
- Mayor West, a character from the animated television series Family Guy
- Mayor Flopdinger, a character from the PBS television series Shining Time Station

=== Films ===
- Mayor (film), a 2020 American documentary film
- Mayor Cupcake, a 2011 film directed by Alex Pires
- Mayor Meenakshi, a 1976 Indian Tamil-language film by Madurai Thirumaran
- Mayor Muthanna, a 1969 Indian Kannada-language film by Siddalingaiah
- Mayor Nair, a 1966 Indian Malayalam-language film by S. R. Puttanna
- Mayor of the Sunset Strip, a 2003 documentary film on the life of Rodney Bingenheimer

=== Music ===
- Mayor of Punkville, a 1999 double live album by William Parker and his Little Huey Creative Music Orchestra
- "Mayor Que Yo", a single from the 2005 album Mas Flow 2
- Mayores, a 2017 single by Becky G and Bad Bunny

=== Television ===
- Dan for Mayor, a Canadian television sitcom which debuted in 2010
- Mayor of the Town (TV series), a U.S. sitcom and drama based on the radio program which aired in 1954
- "Mayored to the Mob", an episode of The Simpsons

=== Other uses in arts, entertainment, and media ===
- Mayor (musical), of 1985 by Warren Leight and Charles Strouse
- A Mayor of Delft and his Daughter, a 1655 oil painting by Dutch painter Jan Steen
- A Mayor's Life, the autobiography of New York City's 106th mayor, David N. Dinkins
- Mayor of the Town (radio program), a U.S. comedy-drama 1942-49

== Buildings ==
- Mayor Gallery, an art gallery located in London
- Mayor Synagogue (disambiguation)

== Organizations ==
- Mayors and Independents, a political party in the Czech Republic
- Mayors for Liberec Region (Czech: Starostové pro Liberecký kraj), a regionalist party in the Czech Republic
- Mayors for Peace, an international organization established in 1982
- Mayors' Association (Portuguese: Association de Maires), a political party in Madagascar

== Sports ==
- Ionia Mayors, a Central League baseball team based in Ionia, Michigan 1921-22
- Lord Mayor's Cup (BRC), a Thoroughbred horse race in Brisbane
- Mayor's Cup (disambiguation)

== Other uses ==
- Boyd v. Mayor of Wellington, a leading case in New Zealand law on the concept of indefeasibility of title (1924)
- Mayor's Court, the highest courts of judicature of the East India Company 1726-1774
- Mayor's mouse (Mus mayori), a species of rodent

== See also ==
- Mayoral (disambiguation)
- The Mayor (disambiguation)
