= Oude Niedorp =

- Village
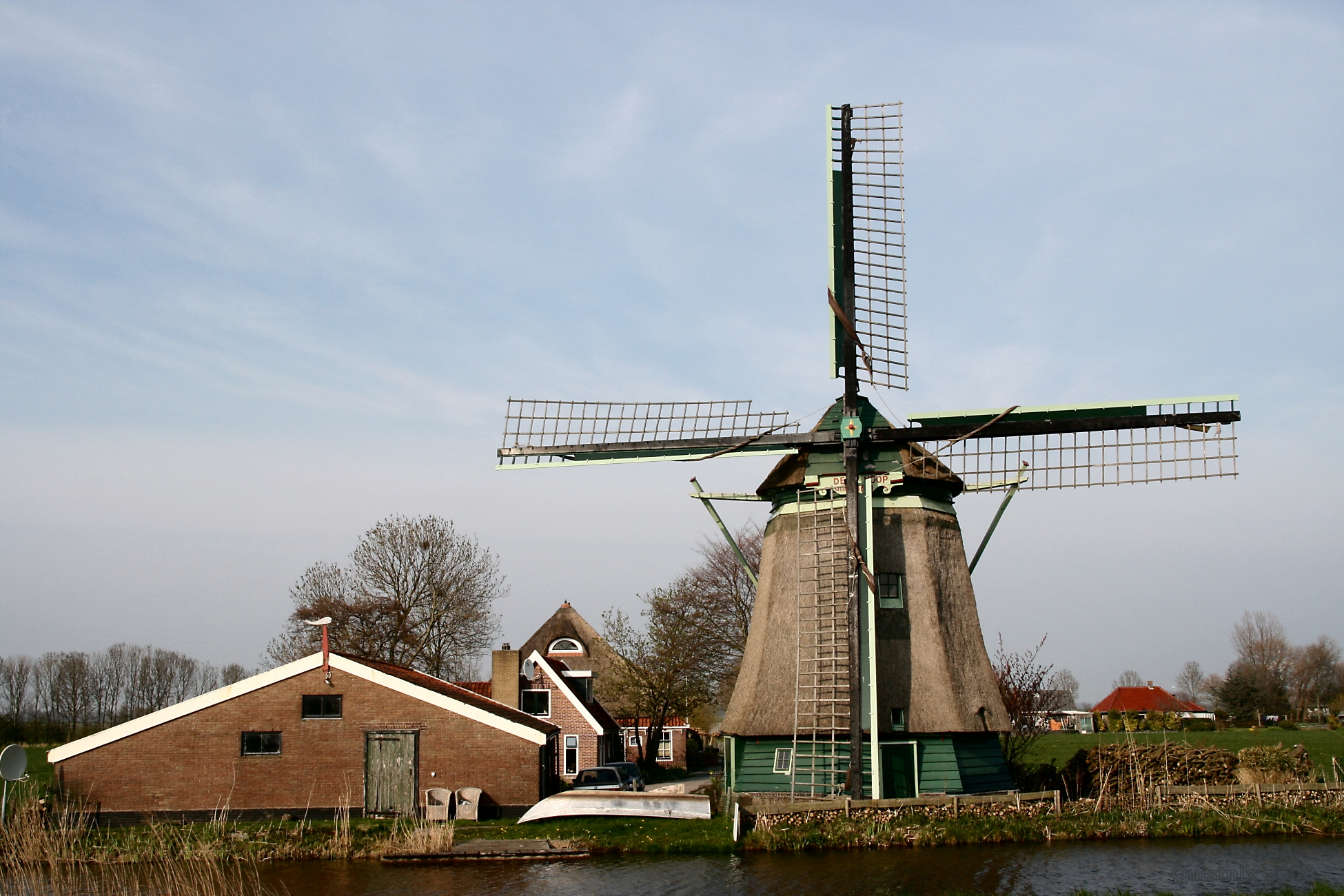

- Coat of arms

- Location in the Netherlands Location in the province of North Holland in the Netherlands
- Coordinates: 52°43′4″N 4°52′19″E
- Country: Netherlands
- Province: North Holland
- Municipality: Hollands Kroon

Area
  - Village: 3.77 km^{2} (1.46 sq mi)
- Elevation: −1.0 m (−3.3 ft)

Population (2025)
  - Village: 395
  - Density: 105/km^{2} (271/sq mi)
  - Urban: 210
  - Rural: 175
- Time zone: UTC+1 (CET)
  - Summer (DST): UTC+2 (CEST)
- Postal code: 1734
- Dialing code: 0226

Oude Niedorp (West Frisian: Ouwe Nierup) is a village in the Dutch province of North Holland. It is a part of the municipality of Hollands Kroon, and lies about 6 kilometres (3.7 mi) northeast of Heerhugowaard.

== History ==
The village was first mentioned in the late 11th century as Nienthorp, and means "old new village". Oude (old) has been added to distinguish from Nieuwe Niedorp. Oude Niedorp developed as a peat excavation settlement in the Middle Ages.

The former Dutch Reformed church probably dated from the 16th century and was restored in 1648. The tower was demolished in 1732. In 1977, the church burnt down and only ruins remain. In 2011, the walls were stabilised, because the ruins had become unsafe.

The grist mill De Hoop was probably built in 1641. The wind mill remained in service until 1961. In 2000, it was returned to service on a voluntary basis.

Oude Niedorp was home to 215 people in 1840. It was a separate municipality until 1970, when it merged with Nieuwe Niedorp and Winkel. In 2012, it became part of the municipality of Hollands Kroon.

== Gallery ==
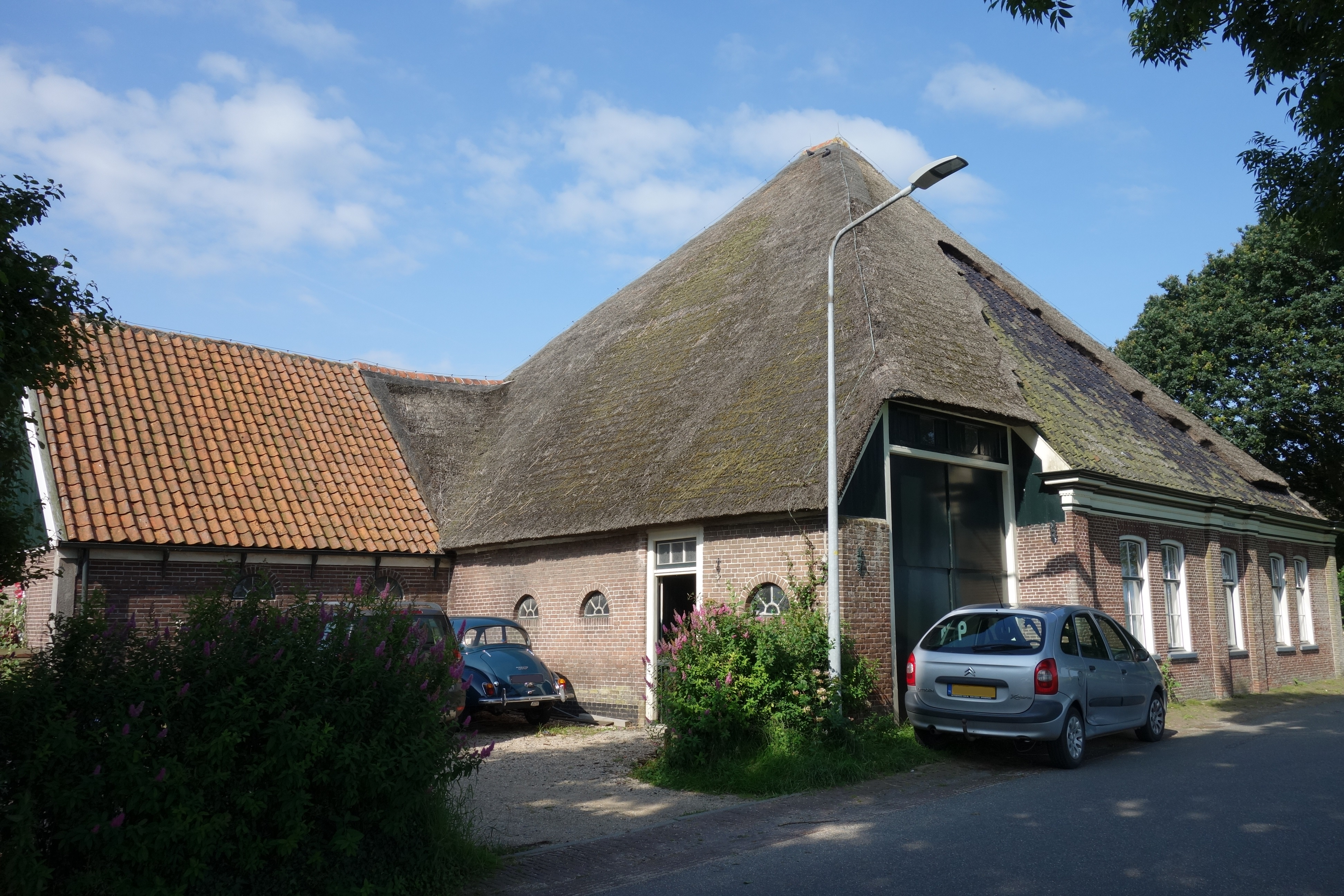
Farm in Oude Niedorp

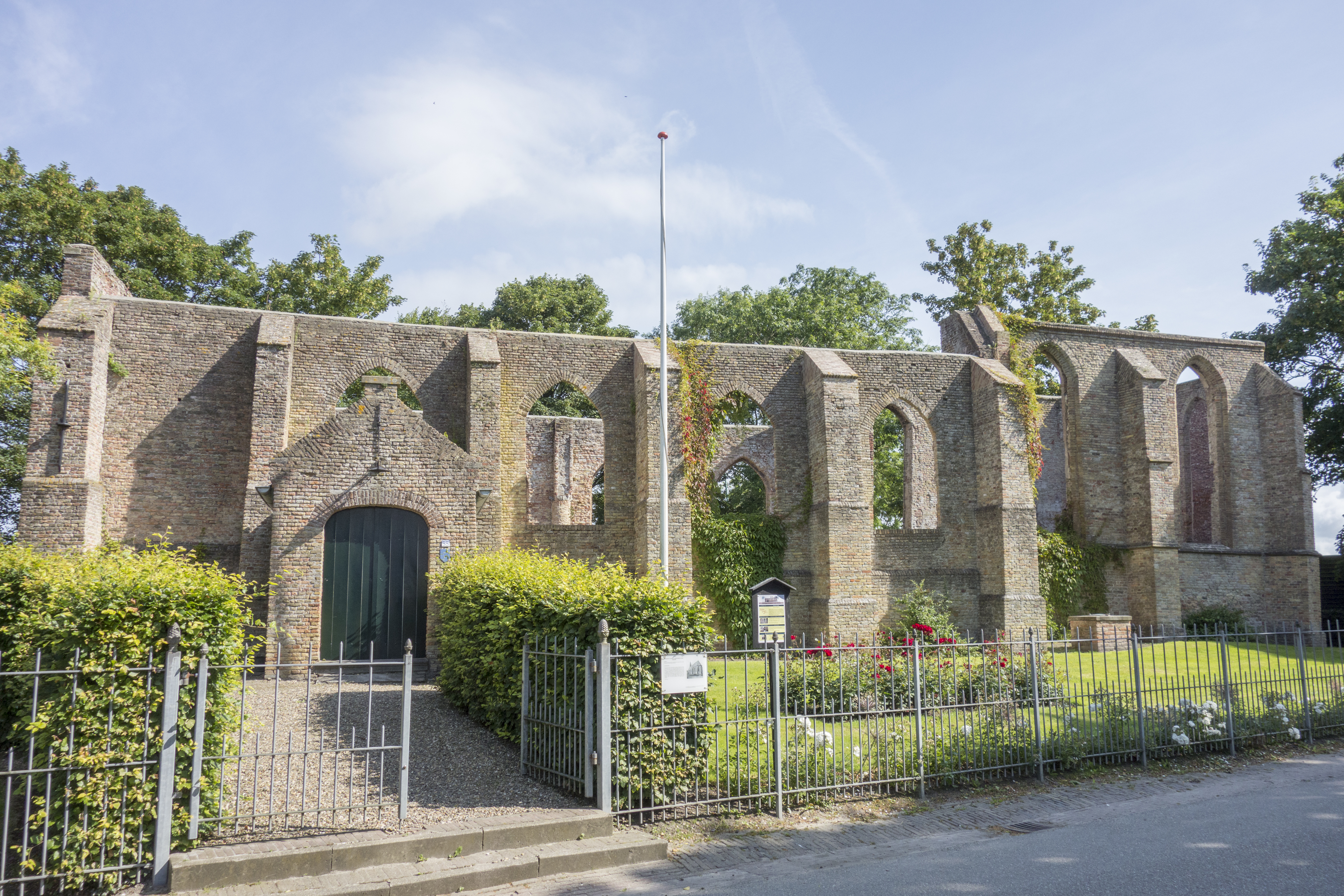
Ruins of the Dutch Reformed church
