= Nieuwe Niedorp =

- Village
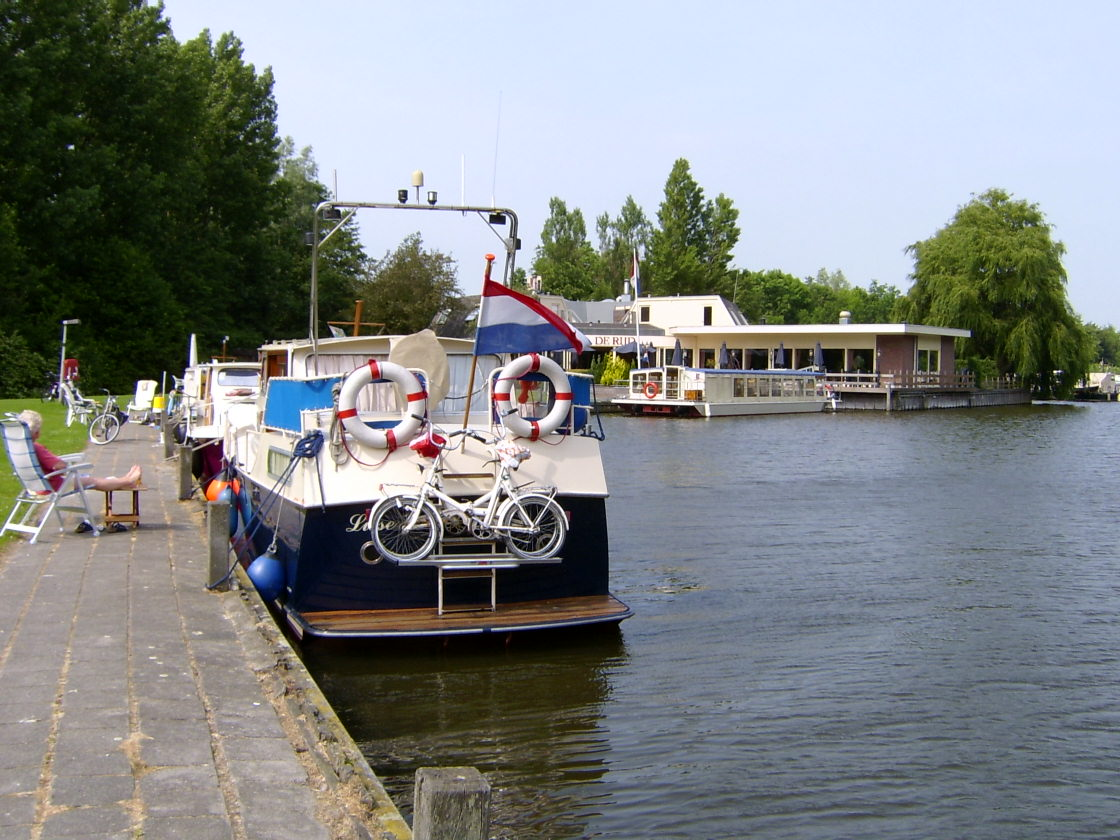
- Marina of Nieuwe Niedorp

- Coat of arms

- Location in the Netherlands Location in the province of North Holland in the Netherlands
- Coordinates: 52°44′29″N 4°54′2″E
- Country: Netherlands
- Province: North Holland
- Municipality: Hollands Kroon

Area
  - Village: 10.82 km^{2} (4.18 sq mi)
- Elevation: −0.5 m (−1.6 ft)

Population (2025)
  - Village: 3,270
  - Density: 302/km^{2} (783/sq mi)
  - Urban: 2,795
  - Rural: 475
- Time zone: UTC+1 (CET)
  - Summer (DST): UTC+2 (CEST)
- Postal code: 1733
- Dialing code: 0226

Nieuwe Niedorp (West Frisian: Naaie Nierup) is a village in the Dutch province of North Holland. It is a part of the municipality of Hollands Kroon, and lies about 9 kilometres (5.6 mi) northeast of Heerhugowaard.

== History ==
The village was first mentioned in 1289 as Niewenniedorp, and means "new new village". The extra Nieuwe (new) was added to distinguish from Oude Niedorp. Nieuwe Niedorp developed in the Middle Ages as a peat excavation area.

The Catholic Our Lady of Immaculate Conception Church was built between 1905 and 1906 as part of a U-shaped Franciscan monastery. The Dutch Reformed Fenix church from 1966, has a leaning church tower.

Nieuwe Niedorp was home to 534 people in 1840. It was a separate municipality until 1970, when it merged with Oude Niedorp and Winkel. In 2012, it became part of the municipality of Hollands Kroon.

== Notable people ==
- Dirck Pietersz van Nierop 1540-1610
- Dirck Rembrantsz van Nierop 1610-1682
- Pieter Rembrantsz van Nierop 1640-1708
- Elisabeth van der Woude 1657-1698

== Gallery ==
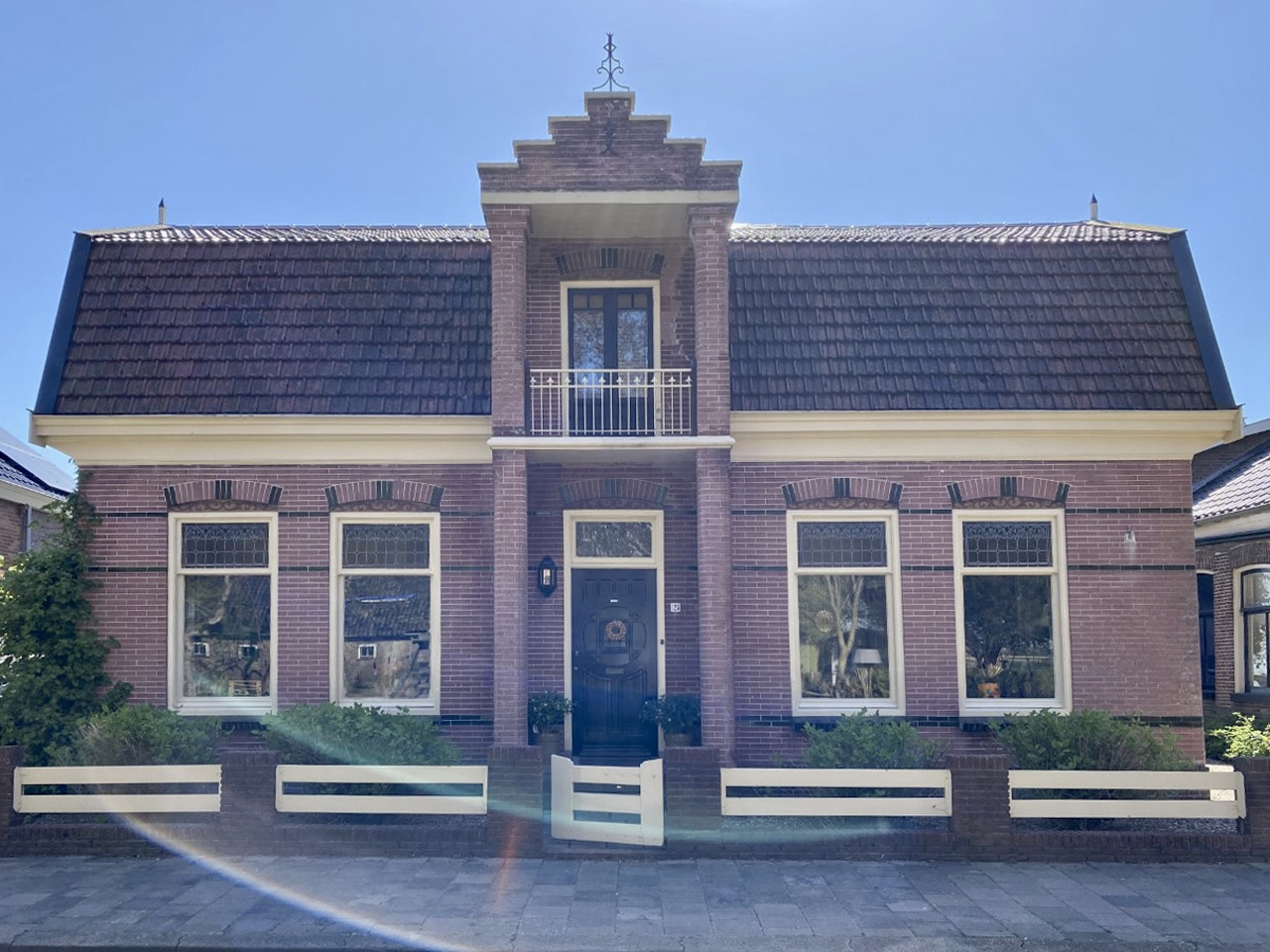
Mayor's house

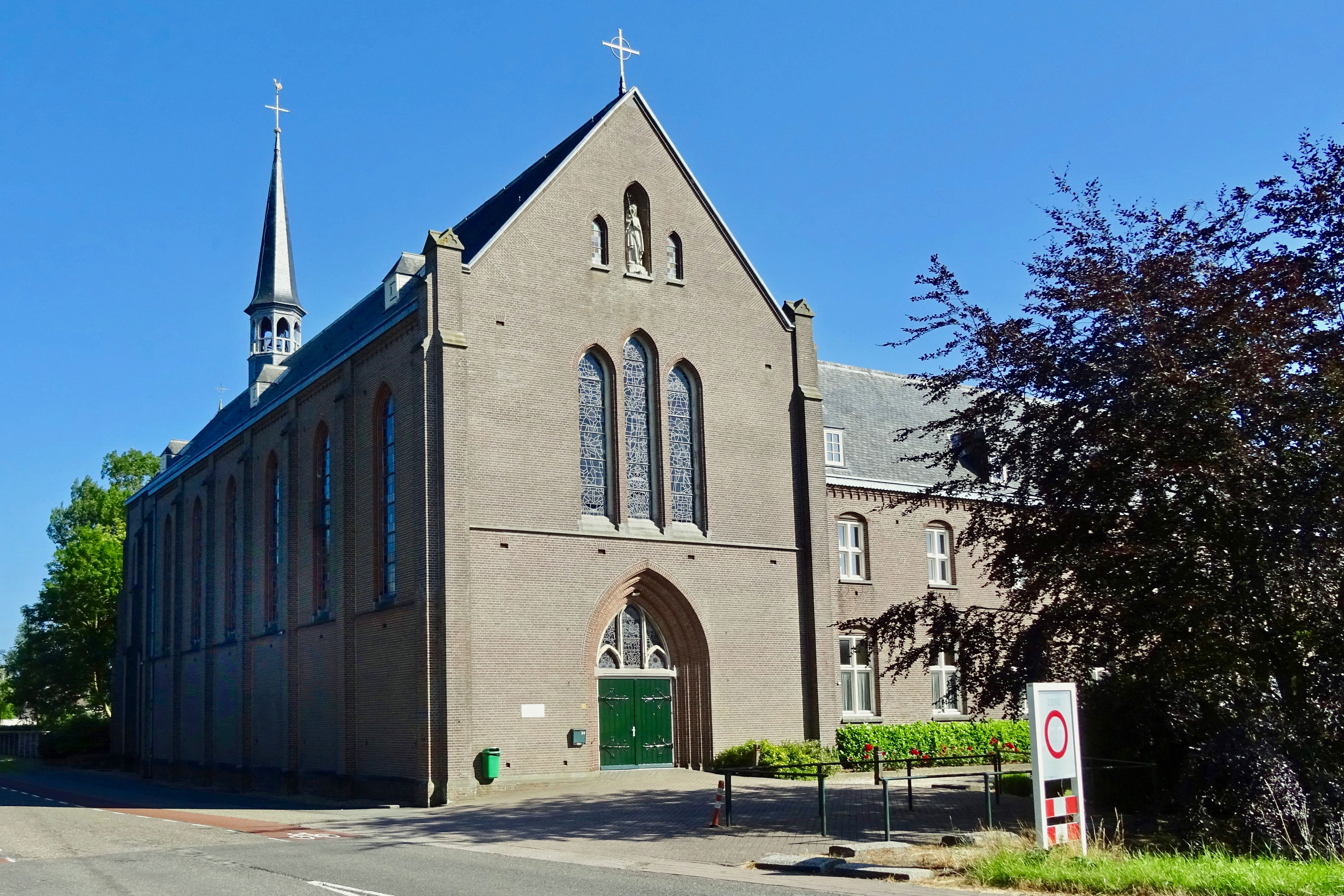
Monastery with church

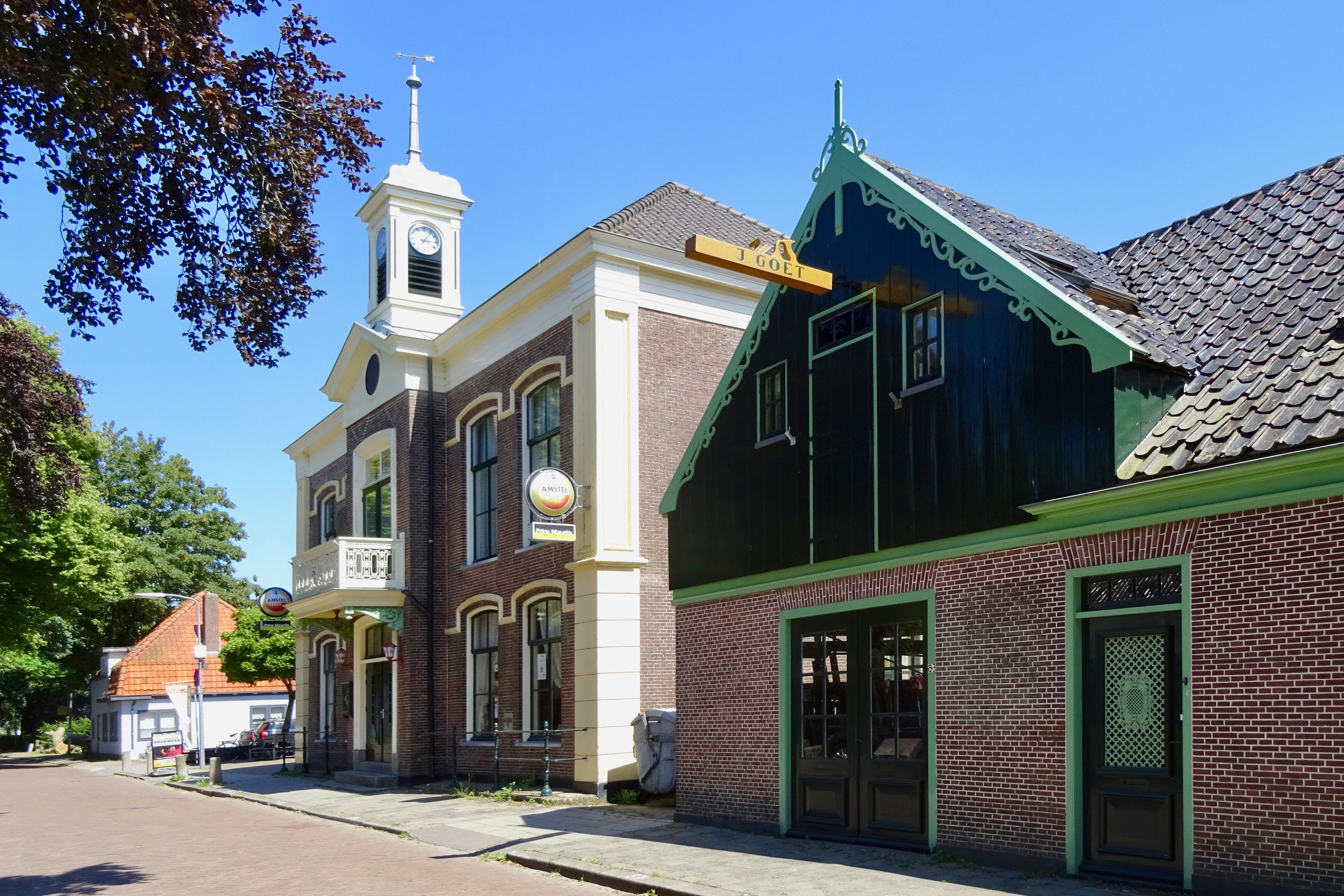
Village house

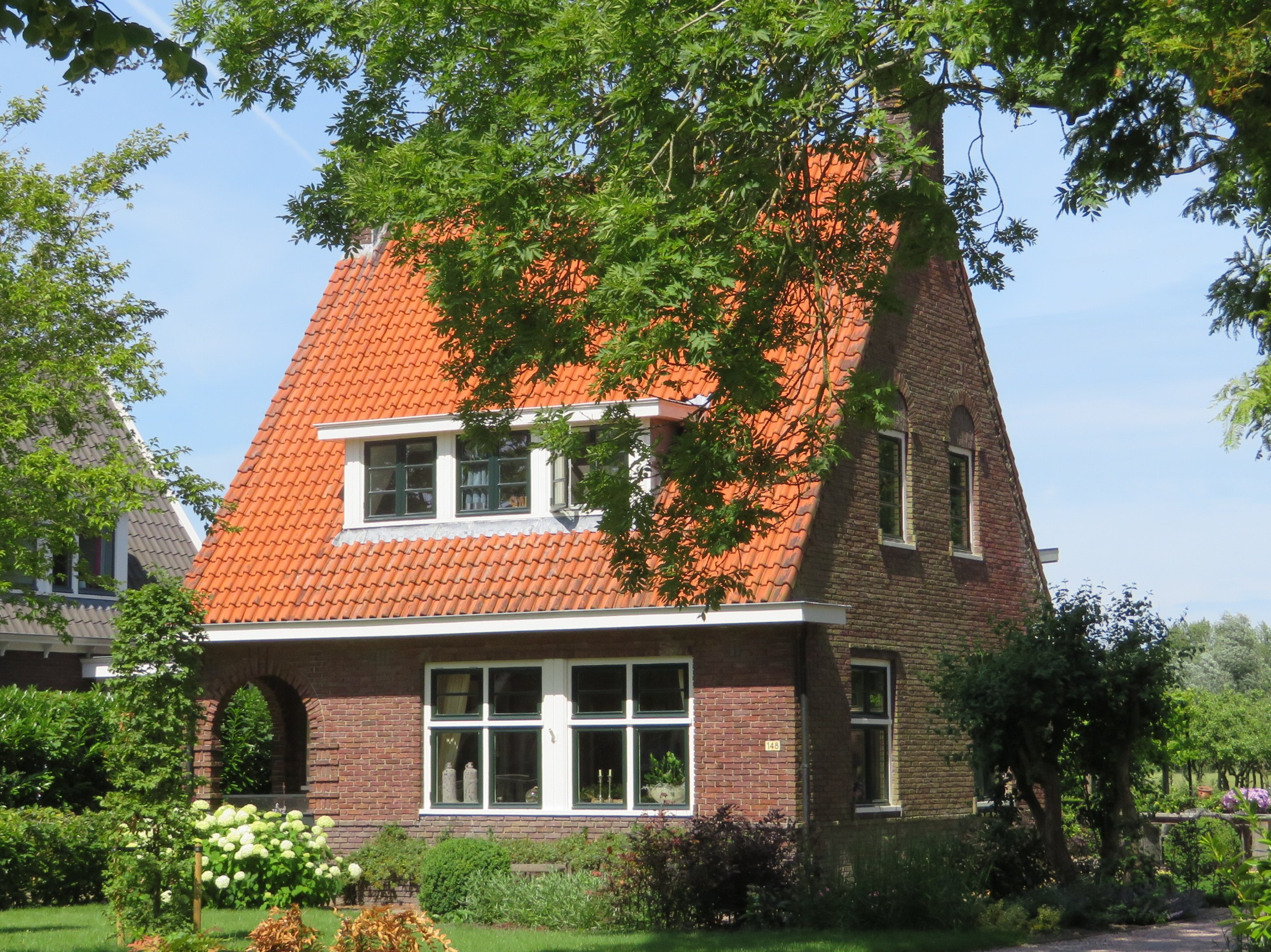
House in Nieuwe Niedorp

== See also ==
- Zeeuws spek
