= Dirck Pietersz van Nierop =

Mennonite minister from North Holland

- Born: 1540; Nieuwe Niedorp
- Died: 1610 (aged 69–70); Amsterdam

Dirck Pietersz van Nierop (1540 – 1610) was a Mennonite minister from North Holland who became notable for founding a branch of Mennonites in Amsterdam called the "Young Frisians" (Jonge Friezen).

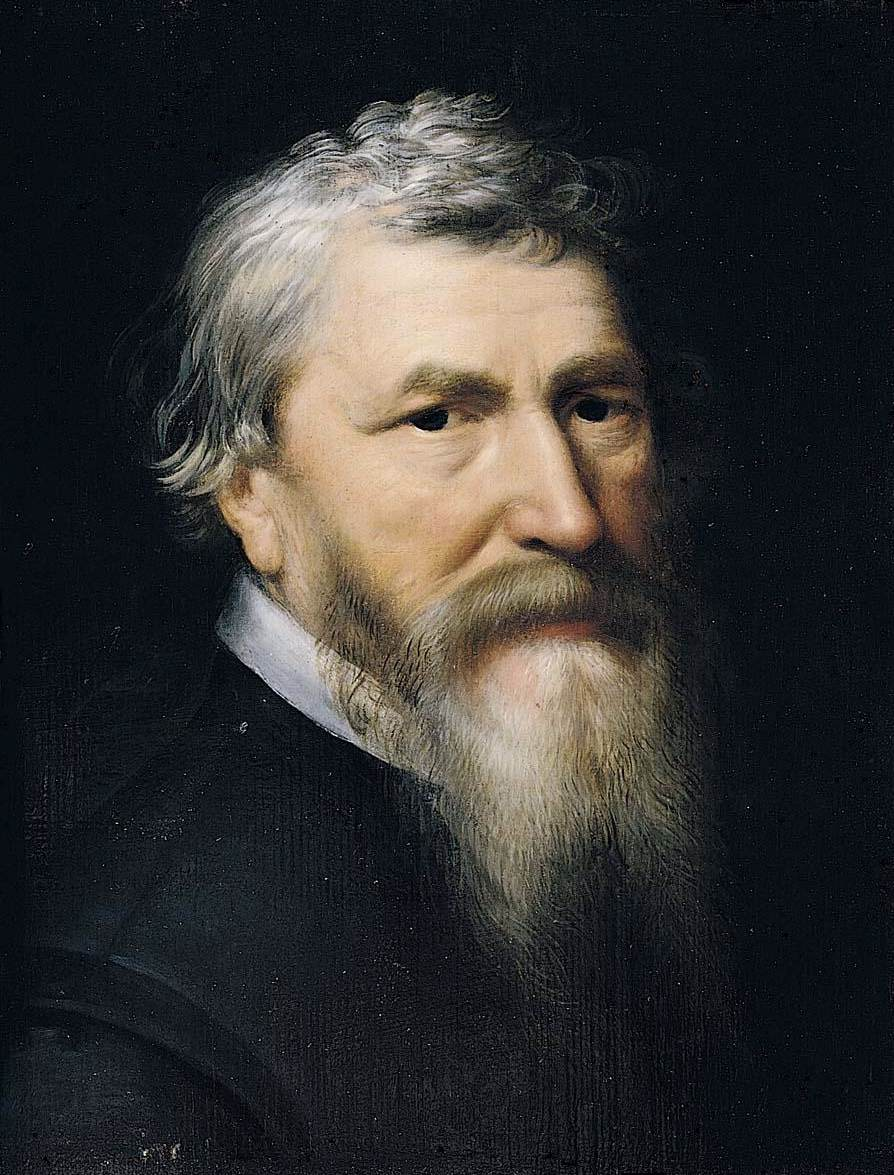
Portrait of Lubbert Gerritsz (1534–1612) by Michiel van Mierevelt in 1607

Nierop was born in Nieuwe Niedorp. After becoming minister, he worked to keep the Dutch Mennonite community together as it was experiencing a culture clash between the Flemish Mennonites and Frisian Mennonites. At a meeting in Hoorn in 1589 where this came to a crisis, he represented the Frisians but was banned from his Mennonite community Doopsgezinde Gemeente der Friezen altogether for what the Mennonites of Hoorn saw as his overly strict practise of Frisian Mennonite beliefs. After being banned, he formed a splinter group called the Young Frisians. Soon after however, he seems to have changed his mind, as he then moved to Amsterdam where he joined the other opposing group called the Waterlanders under the guidance of Lubbert Gerritsz.

Nierop took on the name Hoogsaet or Hooghsaet after moving to Amsterdam, where he later died in 1610, leaving a son Jan and daughters Trijn and Maritje. His son Jan Dircksz. Hoogsaet became a compass-maker and was presumably related to Dirck Rembrantsz van Nierop. Jan Dircksz was married 5 Febr. 1600 in Amsterdam and his father Dirck Pietersz was a witness living on the Haarlemmersluys. In 1614 Jan was shunned from the Mennonites of Amsterdam for living in sin. In 1623 Jan's sister Trijn became a Diacones sister. Jan's daughter Catrina Hoogsaet had her portrait painted by Rembrandt. Maritje had a son Jan who became a shipbuilder Another grandchild Claes Cornelis became the grandfather of the painter Jan Hoogsaat.
