= Portrait of Catharina Hooghsaet =

1657 painting by Rembrandt

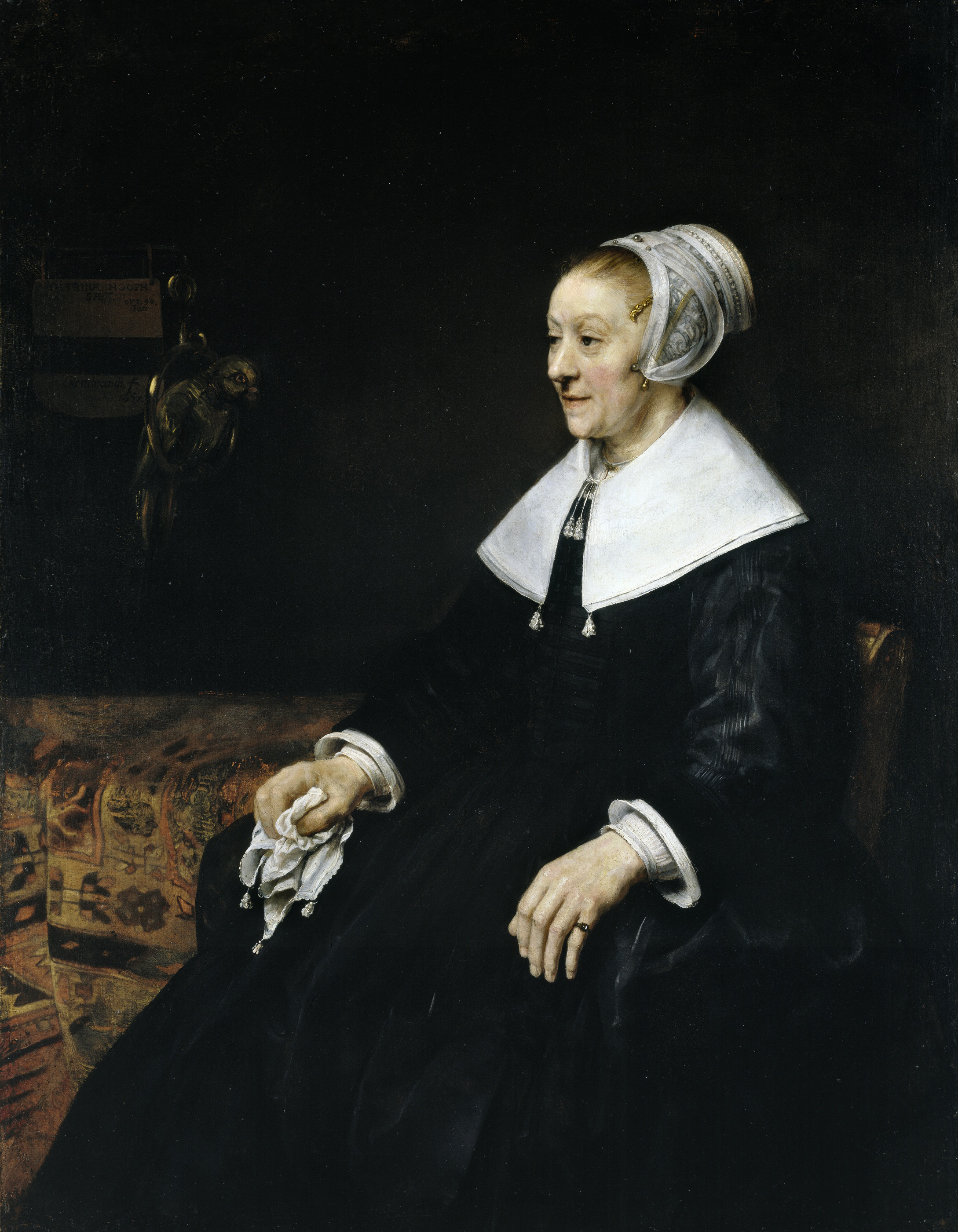
- Portrait of Catharina Hooghsaet
- Artist: Rembrandt
- Year: 1657
- Catalogue: Rembrandt Research Project, A Corpus of Rembrandt Paintings VI: #258
- Medium: Oil on canvas
- Dimensions: 123.5 cm × 95 cm (48.6 in × 37 in)
- Location: National Museum Cardiff

Portrait of Catharina Hooghsaet (1607–1685) is a 1657 painting by the Dutch painter Rembrandt.

== Painting ==
The painting was documented by Hofstede de Groot in 1915, who wrote:

652. CATHARINA HOOGHSAET (1607 -after 1657). Sm. 546, and Suppl. 32; Bode 247; Dut. 216; Wb. 234; B.-HdG. 454.— Full length; life size. She sits in an arm-chair, on which both her arms are stretched out; she is turned to the left and looks in that direction. She holds a handkerchief in her right hand. She wears the black gown of a citizen's wife, with a plain flat white collar and a white cap, covering her hair, which is smoothly combed back. Beside her. to the left is a table with a Turkish carpet having a red pattern. Above the table a metal ring with a parrot hangs from a bracket fixed to the wall. In even daylight. Dark background. Signed to the left at top on two labels on the wall-bracket, "Catrina Hooghsaet, out 50 jaer, Rembrandt 1657"; canvas, 49 1/2inches by 38 1/2 inches.

Mentioned by Vosmaer, p. 557; Bode, pp. 516, 590; Dutuit, p. 47; Michel, p. 558 [433]; Waagen, ii. 336; Moes, No. 3684. Exhibited at the British Institution, London, 1851, No. 52; at the Royal Academy Winter Exhibition. 1873, No. 137, and 1899, No. 75 at the Grafton Gallery, London, 1911, No. 60.

Sale. — Lord Le Despencer, London, 1831 (£178 : 10s.).

In the possession of the London dealer Peacock, 1842.

Sales. — E. Higginson of Saltmarsh Castle, London, June 4, 1846 — 1842

catalogue, No. 39 (£798, Turner, bought in). E. Higginson, London, 1860 (£777, Farrer).

In the collection of Lord Penrhyn, Penrhyn Castle.

The painting is unusual for a portrait as it features a pet. Catharina is looking at her pet parrot with a satisfied look that prompted Horst Gerson to remark that her lively commune with her pet bird would make an interesting subject for a book about Rembrandt and animals. The biography of Catharina Hooghsaet was written in 2014 and at the time the painting was made, she was aged 50 and living estranged from her husband.

Catharina is wearing the sober black dress of the Mennonite community but the silk sheen of her dress, pearl pin, hairpin, ring and gold cap support show off her wealth. The same year she commissioned the portrait she drew up her will and named several nieces and nephews and sums to the poor of both the Mennonite community and the Reformed community. The Rembrandt portrait was left to her brother along with 2000 guilders, and the parrot was to be left to Giertje Crommelingh.

== Hoogsaet, Hooghsaet, Hoogzaad ==
Genealogy experts from the Dutch Hoogzaad family paid a visit to the Rijksmuseum in 2007 when the painting was on loan there. The Hoogzaad family papers showed that Catharina or Catrina or Trijn was the granddaughter of Dirck Pietersz van Nierop, a man from a farm in Nieuwe Niedorp called Hoochsaet and that this is the origin of the Hoogzaad name. The painting had been on loan since November 2006 for the end of the Rembrandt year celebrated in Amsterdam. An article in the Noord-Hollands Dagblad mentions the Hoogzaad family's work and that the owners of the painting, the Douglas-Pennant family, were at that time negotiating a sale with the Rijksmuseum for €70 million. The NRC during the same period also remarked on the possible Rembrandt deal, but did not mention a price. The Rijksmuseum had earlier acquired the Jan Steen painting from the Douglas-Pennant family in 2004 called A Mayor of Delft and his Daughter.

== 2015 sale ==
The painting was lent to the National Gallery in 2014 for an exhibition on Rembrandt's late works, and travelled to the Rijksmuseum the following year. It was then returned to Penrhyn Castle but was sold shortly after. The painting was sold to a private collector outside the UK for £35 million in September 2015. At that time the portrait was deemed, by the UK Reviewing Committee on the Export of Works of Art (RCEWA), to meet the Waverley Criteria, the three tests used to identify "national treasures" - objects whose export would be a "misfortune". The UK government placed a temporary export ban on October 16, 2015, but the original export license application was subsequently withdrawn, by the overseas buyer, on the understanding that the work would instead remain in the United Kingdom for the time being. Thereafter the painting was on display in the National Museum Cardiff.

== See also ==
- List of paintings by Rembrandt

== Sources ==
- 546. Portrait of Catherine Hoogh, a lady in Smith's catalogue raisonne of 1836
- Portrait of Catherine Hoogh listed in the collection of Lord Penrhyn under England in Rembrandt, his life, his work and his time, by Emile Michel, 1894
