= The Mayor =

The Mayor can refer to:

- Fred Hoiberg, a basketball player and coach nicknamed "The Mayor"
- The Mayor (1997 film), an Italian film
- The Mayor (2017 film), a South Korean film
- The Mayor (The PowerPuff Girls), a character in the animated television series
- The Mayor (TV series), an American television sitcom
- The Mayors, a 2004 Nigerian drama film written, produced and directed by Dickson Iroegbu
- "The Mayor", a song by Hieroglyphics from the 2013 album The Kitchen

== See also ==
- Mayor (disambiguation)
- He's the Mayor, a 1986 American sitcom
- She's the Mayor, a 2011 Canadian sitcom
- The Best Mayor, The King (Spanish: El mejor alcalde, el rey), a play by Lope de Vega
- The Chinese Mayor, a 2014 documentary film about Datong mayor Geng Yanbo
- The Mayor From Ireland, a 1912 American silent film produced by Kalem Company
- The Mayor of 44th Street, a 1942 film directed by Alfred E. Green
- "The Mayor of Candor Lied", a 1976 song by Harry Chapin
- The Mayor of Casterbridge, an 1886 novel by Thomas Hardy, which has been the subject of several adaptations
- The Mayor of Hell, an American film starring James Cagney
- The Mayor of MacDougal Street, a 2005 compilation album by Dave Van Ronk
- The Mayor of Oyster Bay, a 2002 English film
- The Mayor of Zalamea (Spanish: El Alcalde de Zalamea), a play by Pedro Calderón de la Barca (1600–1681), which has been adapted for several films
- The Mayor's Nest, a 1932 British comedy film directed by Maclean Rogers
