= Zeeuws spek =

Dutch cuisine

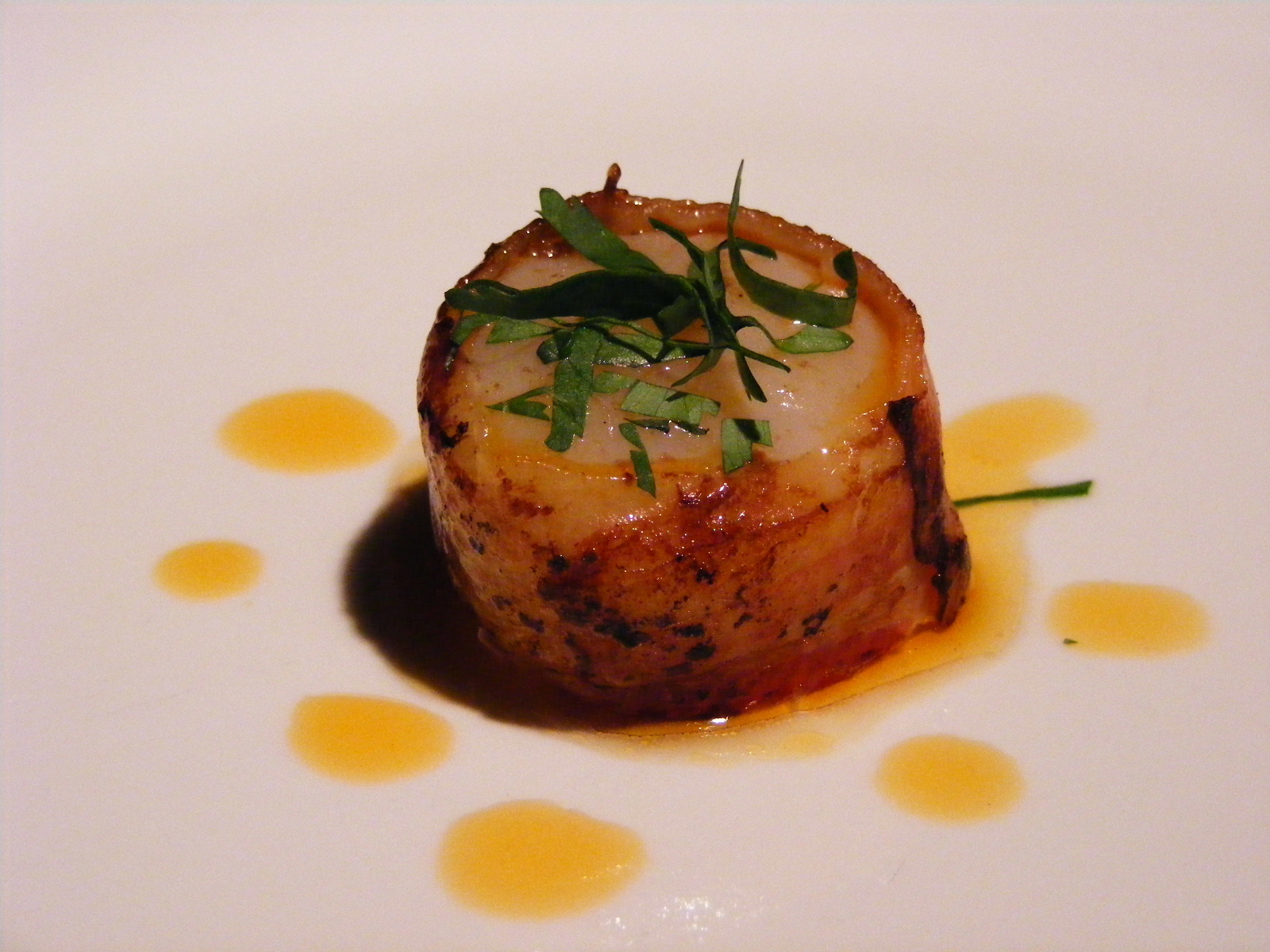
- Scallop wrapped in Zeeuws spek
- Place of origin: Netherlands
- Region or state: Zeeland
- Serving temperature: Hot or cold
- Main ingredients: Pork
- Food energy (per serving): 450 (per 100 g)
- Other information: 15 g protein, 38 g total fat

Zeeuws spek (pronounced [zeːu(s) ˈspɛk]; "Zeelandic bacon") is a traditional Dutch bacon, originally a specialty from the province of Zeeland. Traditionally, it is seasoned with salt, pepper and herbs such as bay leaf, and slow-cooked. Modern Zeeuws spek is marinated, and then grilled, broiled, or smoked.

== Preparation ==
Zeeuws spek sold in butcher stores is prepared by marination in a spiced oil and mustard mixture (with the addition of soy sauce, pepper, and other aromatics) and then lightly grilled or broiled (or sometimes smoked). Its flavor is described as reminiscent of barbecue. Recipes suggest a variety of flavoring ingredients. Commercially available Zeeuws spek also contains additives, such as lactose and MSG.

== Application ==
Traditionally, Zeeuws spek is eaten on whole-grain bread with mustard; other uses include serving it as an hors d'œuvre, on a salad, or with baked potatoes. A notable sandwich with Zeeuws spek is made in Vermaat restaurant, in IJsselstein; Ronald van der Kruk uses Zeeuws spek, bacon, katenspek (bacon which is boiled before it is smoked), and ontbijtspek ("breakfast bacon").

Zeeuws spek continues to be held in high regard as a Zeeland dish, though in Zeeland it is also used in fusion foods, such as the Dutch/Indonesian/Chinese fusion dish babi panggang.

== National competition ==
The national organization of butchers, Slavakto, organizes a competition to determine the best Zeeuws spek in the country. In 2007, the prize went to Jacco van Zoonen of Nieuwe Niedorp. In 2008, the award went to Niek Kramer of Anna Paulowna. In 2009, Gerard Haring of Hengelo was the winner.

== See also ==
- Dutch cuisine
