= Mayoral =

Mayoral is an adjectival form of mayor. It may refer to:

== In people ==
- Borja Mayoral (born 1997), Spanish footballer
- César Mayoral (born 1947), Argentine diplomat
- David Mayoral (born 1997), Spanish footballer
- Jordi Mayoral (born 1973), Spanish sprinter
- Juan Eugenio Hernández Mayoral (born 1969), Puerto Rican politician
- Lila Mayoral Wirshing (1942-2003), First Lady of Puerto Rico
- Marina Mayoral (born 1942), Spanish writer, columnist and novelist

== In other ==
- Mayoral (company), Spanish children's fashion Company
- Mayoral Academies, publicly funded charter schools in the state of Rhode Island
- Mayoral Gallery, Barcelona

== See also ==
- Mayor (disambiguation)
- Mayor (surname)
