= Mayor's Cup =

Mayor's Cup may refer to:

- Guyana Mayors Cup, the top knockout tournament of the Guyana Football Federation
- Mayor's Cup, a traveling trophy awarded to the winner of the Rensselaer–Union College ice hockey game
- Mayor's Cup, a traveling trophy awarded to the winner of the Brown–Providence ice hockey game
- Mayor's Cup, a traveling trophy awarded to the winner of the New Mexico State and UTEP college football game known as the Battle of I-10
- Mayor's Cup, a traveling trophy awarded to the winner of the Missouri and South Carolina football game, so named because both universities are in cities named Columbia.
- Mayor's Cup, a traveling trophy awarded to the winner of the Oral Roberts–Tulsa basketball rivalry
- Mayor's Cup, a traveling trophy awarded to the winner of the SMU–Rice football rivalry
- Mayor's Cup (Temple–Villanova), a traveling trophy awarded to the winner of the football game between Temple University and Villanova University.
- Osaka Mayor's Cup, an annually held International Tennis Federation (ITF) Grade-A junior tennis tournament
- Rowdies Cup, formerly Mayor's Cup, a traveling trophy awarded to the winner of the college soccer game between USF Bulls and Tampa Spartans
