= Elisabeth van der Woude =

Elisabeth van der Woude (January 11, 1657 – December 11, 1698 (buried)) was a Dutch traveller and writer.

She was born in Nieuwe Niedorp, North Holland, but left The Netherlands at age 19 with her family (her father Harman Hartman van der Woude, her brother and sister) and hundreds of others bound for Guyana, formerly a Dutch colony, now French Guiana. Their aim was to start a colony on the river Oyapock, with her father as the appointed governor. Van der Woude's father and sister died en route. She and her brother found good land when they arrived, but soon most of the servants died of a strange illness and Elisabeth returned home. During that journey she was kidnapped by Dunkirkers and kept a prisoner for some weeks. She did manage to return home with her diary, which she had regularly kept. She died in Amsterdam, aged 41. The part of her diary describing her journeys and also about the Anglo-Dutch Wars when her father was a colonel was published in 1928 and 2001 in The Netherlands.

== References and sources ==
- (in Dutch) Kim Isolde Muller (Ed.): Elisabeth van der Woude: Memorije van 't geen bij mijn tijt is voorgevallen : met het opzienbarende verslag van haar reis naar de Wilde Kust 1676-1677. Terra Incognita : Amsterdam, 2001, ISBN 9789073853133
- (in Dutch) S.P. l’Honoré Naber (Ed.): Eene Hollandsche jonge dame aan de Oyapock in 1677 (Dagboek van Elisabeth van der Woude), BMHG 49 (1928) 214-236.
- Milbry Polk, Mary Tiegreen: Women of Discovery - A Celebration of intrepid Women who explored the World. Clarkson Potter : New York, 2001. ISBN 0-609-60480-5
