= Brown–Providence men's ice hockey rivalry =

College sports rivalry in Rhode Island, U.S.

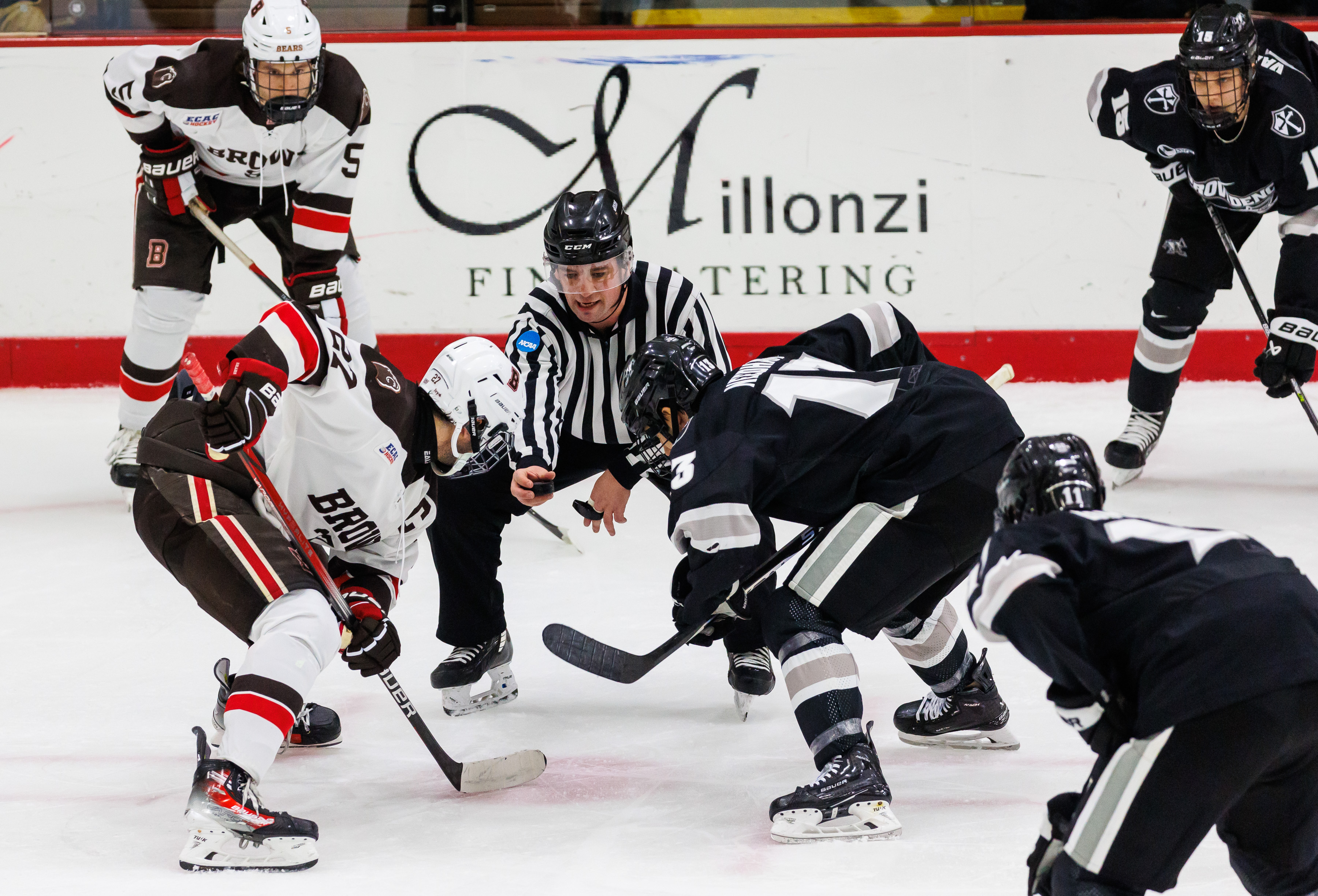
- Brown Bears face off against the Providence Friars in December 2023

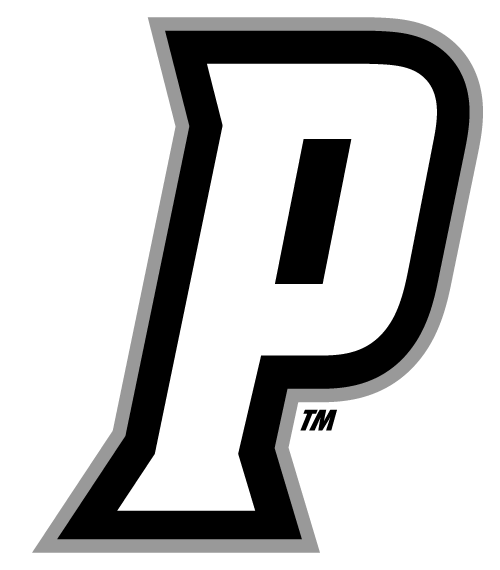
- Brown Bears Providence Friars
- Sport: Ice hockey
- First meeting: 1 March 1927; Brown 4, Providence 1
- Latest meeting: 9 December 2025; Providence 4, Brown 2
- Next meeting: TBA
- Stadiums: Meehan Auditorium; Schneider Arena
- Trophy: Mayor's Cup

Statistics
- Total meetings: 107
- All-time series: Providence leads, 57–47–3 (.547)
- Largest victory: Brown, 12–4 (21 November 1952)
- Longest win streak: Brown, 9 (23 February 1965 – 30 November 1968)
- Current win streak: Providence, 3

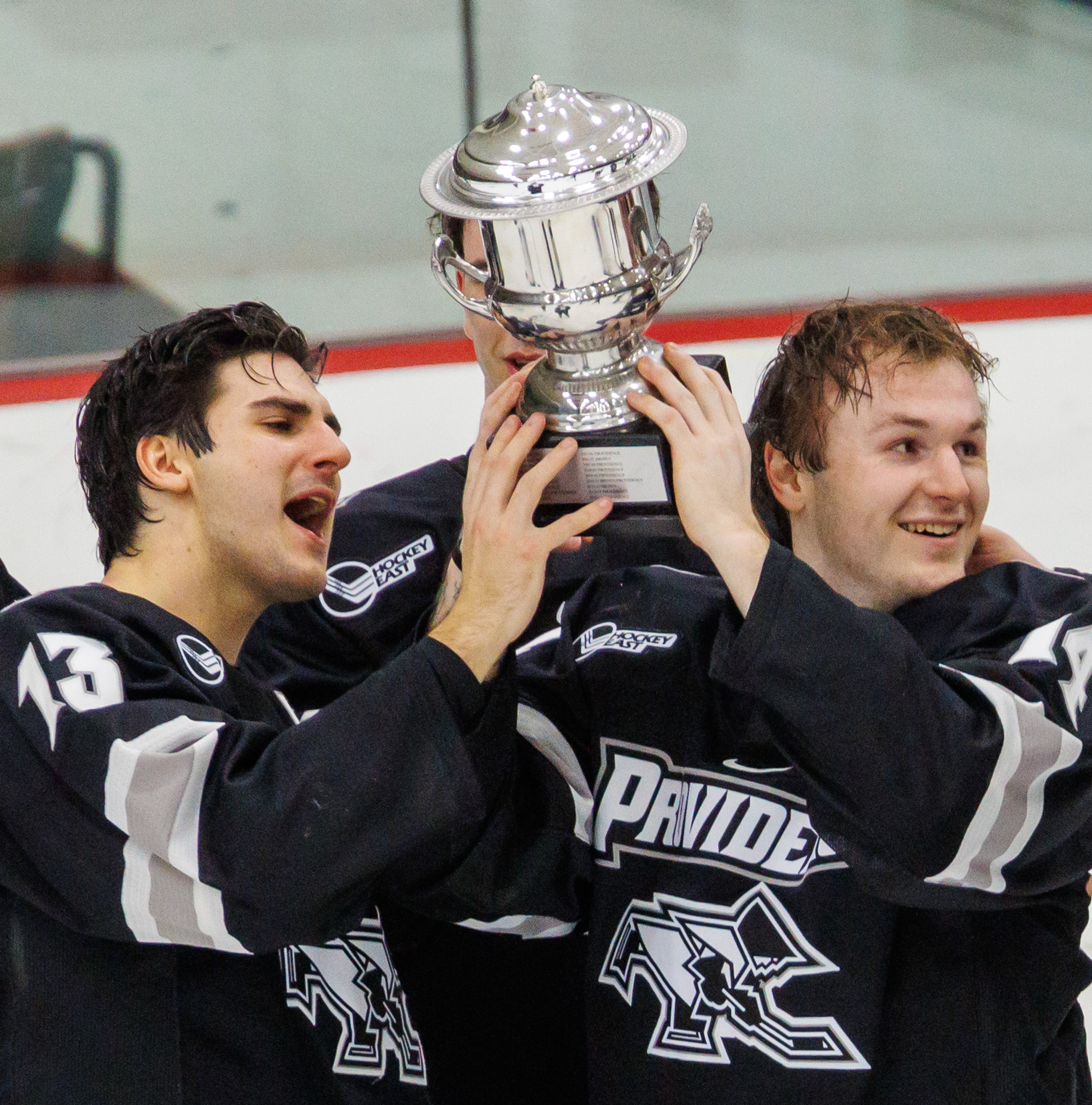
Providence Friar Cal Kiefiuk (no. 14) holds the Mayor's Cup. To his right is Craig Needham (no. 13). 30 December, 2023.

The Brown–Providence men's ice hockey rivalry is a college ice hockey rivalry between the Brown Bears men's ice hockey and Providence Friars men's ice hockey programs. The first meeting between the two occurred on 1 March 1927 but wasn't played annually until 1952.

== History ==
While Brown had first played varsity ice hockey as far back as the 19th century, the team did not have any local facility and was forced to suspend operations for 20 years. In 1926, the Rhode Island Auditorium was built and enable the school to restart its program. The same year, Providence College began its ice hockey team, however, the new team lasted just one year before being mothballed. Providence returned to the ice after World War II and the two teams promptly began playing one another. The teams became fast rivals, sharing not only a state and a city but a home rink as well.

Brown and Providence typically played one another twice a season and both were founding members of ECAC Hockey in 1961. Coincidentally, that was also the season that Brown completed the Meehan Auditorium, giving the program its first permanent on-campus home. A decade later, Providence followed suit, building the Schneider Arena. While the two played as conference opponents for over 20 years, they never met in a playoff game.

In 1984, Providence was one of seven member schools to leave the ECAC and form Hockey East. In order to continue the rivalry between the programs, the two schools began awarding the 'Mayor's Cup' to the winner of their annual match. In the years since splitting into separate conferences, Brown and Providence have played one another at least once a season except for 1987 and 2021 (as of 2022).

== Game results ==
Full game results for the rivalry, with rankings beginning in the 1998–99 season.

Brown victories	Providence victories	Tie games

No.	Date	Location	Winning team		Losing team		Notes
1	1 March 1927	Rhode Island Auditorium; Providence, RI	Brown	4	Providence	1	
2	11 March 1927	Rhode Island Auditorium; Providence, RI	Brown	3	Providence	1	
3	21 November 1952	Rhode Island Auditorium; Providence, RI	Brown	12	Providence	4	
4	5 January 1954	Rhode Island Auditorium; Providence, RI	Brown	7	Providence	3	
5	2 February 1954	Rhode Island Auditorium; Providence, RI	Brown	9	Providence	1	
6	13 December 1954	Rhode Island Auditorium; Providence, RI	Providence	5	Brown	2	
7	31 January 1955	Rhode Island Auditorium; Providence, RI	Brown	10	Providence	5	
8	7 January 1956	Rhode Island Auditorium; Providence, RI	Brown	7	Providence	3	
9	21 February 1956	Rhode Island Auditorium; Providence, RI	Brown	7	Providence	2	
10	11 December 1956	Rhode Island Auditorium; Providence, RI	Providence	4	Brown	2	
11	6 March 1957	Rhode Island Auditorium; Providence, RI	Providence	13	Brown	6	
12	1 January 1958	Rhode Island Auditorium; Providence, RI	Brown	7	Providence	3	
13	25 February 1958	Rhode Island Auditorium; Providence, RI	Providence	5	Brown	2	
14	18 February 1959	Rhode Island Auditorium; Providence, RI	Brown	4	Providence	3	
15	25 February 1959	Rhode Island Auditorium; Providence, RI	Brown	4	Providence	1	
16	2 December 1959	Rhode Island Auditorium; Providence, RI	Providence	5	Brown	2	
17	28 December 1959	Boston Arena; Boston, MA	Providence	5	Brown	2	Boston Arena Christmas Tournament
18	5 March 1960	Rhode Island Auditorium; Providence, RI	Providence	6	Brown	3	
19	30 November 1960	Rhode Island Auditorium; Providence, RI	Providence	5	Brown	1	
20	2 March 1961	Rhode Island Auditorium; Providence, RI	Providence	9	Brown	0	
21	8 March 1962	Rhode Island Auditorium; Providence, RI	Providence	4	Brown	1	ECAC play begins
22	10 March 1962	Meehan Auditorium; Providence, RI	Providence	4	Brown	1	
23	27 February 1963	Rhode Island Auditorium; Providence, RI	Brown	4	Providence	2	
24	6 March 1963	Meehan Auditorium; Providence, RI	Brown	4	Providence	2	
25	5 February 1964	Rhode Island Auditorium; Providence, RI	Providence	7	Brown	6	
26	26 February 1964	Meehan Auditorium; Providence, RI	Providence	5	Brown	3	
27	23 February 1965	Rhode Island Auditorium; Providence, RI	Brown	5	Providence	3	
28	3 March 1965	Meehan Auditorium; Providence, RI	Brown	7	Providence	4	
29	18 December 1965	Meehan Auditorium; Providence, RI	Brown	3	Providence	1	
30	16 February 1966	Rhode Island Auditorium; Providence, RI	Brown	6	Providence	3	
31	11 January 1967	Meehan Auditorium; Providence, RI	Brown	7	Providence	1	
32	22 February 1967	Rhode Island Auditorium; Providence, RI	Brown	9	Providence	1	
33	2 December 1967	Meehan Auditorium; Providence, RI	Brown	9	Providence	0	
34	12 December 1967	Rhode Island Auditorium; Providence, RI	Brown	5	Providence	0	
35	30 November 1968	Meehan Auditorium; Providence, RI	Brown	3	Providence	2	
36	19 February 1969	Rhode Island Auditorium; Providence, RI	Providence	4	Brown	2	
37	16 December 1969	Meehan Auditorium; Providence, RI	Providence	5	Brown	3	
38	3 February 1970	Rhode Island Auditorium; Providence, RI	Brown	4	Providence	2	
39	13 January 1971	Rhode Island Auditorium; Providence, RI	Providence	9	Brown	4	
40	2 March 1971	Meehan Auditorium; Providence, RI	Brown	5	Providence	1	
41	1 February 1972	Rhode Island Auditorium; Providence, RI	Brown	6	Providence	5	
42	19 February 1972	Meehan Auditorium; Providence, RI	Providence	3	Brown	2	
43	1 February 1973	Meehan Auditorium; Providence, RI	Brown	5	Providence	3	
44	19 February 1973	Meehan Auditorium; Providence, RI	Brown	5	Providence	4	
45	10 January 1974	Schneider Arena; Providence, RI	Providence	6	Brown	1	
46	20 February 1974	Meehan Auditorium; Providence, RI	Brown	7	Providence	2	
47	7 January 1975	Meehan Auditorium; Providence, RI	Brown	8	Providence	5	
48	26 January 1975	Schneider Arena; Providence, RI	Providence	9	Brown	1	
49	7 January 1976	Meehan Auditorium; Providence, RI	Providence	9	Brown	6	
50	25 February 1976	Schneider Arena; Providence, RI	Brown	4	Providence	2	
51	1 December 1977	Schneider Arena; Providence, RI	Providence	7	Brown	4	
52	4 January 1977	Meehan Auditorium; Providence, RI	Brown	5	Providence	3	
53	4 January 1978	Meehan Auditorium; Providence, RI	Providence	4	Brown	2	
54	15 January 1978	Schneider Arena; Providence, RI	Brown	7	Providence	5	
55	10 January 1979	Schneider Arena; Providence, RI	Brown	5	Providence	3	
56	3 February 1979	Meehan Auditorium; Providence, RI	Providence	7	Brown	5	
57	29 December 1979	Meehan Auditorium; Providence, RI	Providence	4	Brown	2	
58	10 January 1980	Schneider Arena; Providence, RI	Brown	8	Providence	2	
59	26 January 1981	Schneider Arena; Providence, RI	Providence	7	Brown	4	
60	18 February 1981	Meehan Auditorium; Providence, RI	Providence	9	Brown	4	
61	16 February 1982	Schneider Arena; Providence, RI	Providence	8	Brown	4	
62	11 February 1983	Meehan Auditorium; Providence, RI	Providence	7	Brown	4	
63	12 February 1983	Schneider Arena; Providence, RI	Providence	8	Brown	0	
64	8 February 1984	Schneider Arena; Providence, RI	Providence	5	Brown	2	ECAC play ends
65	9 January 1985	Meehan Auditorium; Providence, RI	Brown	4	Providence	3	
66	1 March 1986	Schneider Arena; Providence, RI	Providence	5	Brown	3	Mayor's Cup first awarded
67	5 January 1988	Schneider Arena; Providence, RI	Providence	9	Brown	6	
68	2 January 1989	Meehan Auditorium; Providence, RI	Providence	5	Brown	2	
69	23 January 1990	Schneider Arena; Providence, RI	Brown	5	Providence	4	(OT)
70	20 November 1990	Meehan Auditorium; Providence, RI	Providence	7	Brown	1	
71	2 December 1991	Schneider Arena; Providence, RI	Providence	9	Brown	5	
72	30 November 1992	Providence Civic Center; Providence, RI	Providence	6	Brown	4	
73	28 November 1993	Providence Civic Center; Providence, RI	Tie	2	Tie	2	(OT)
74	17 January 1995	Meehan Auditorium; Providence, RI	Providence	6	Brown	3	
75	25 November 1995	Schneider Arena; Providence, RI	Brown	8	Providence	5	
76	25 January 1997	Meehan Auditorium; Providence, RI	Brown	3	Providence	2	
77	31 January 1998	Schneider Arena; Providence, RI	Brown	6	Providence	3	
78	12 January 1999	Meehan Auditorium; Providence, RI	Providence	3	Brown	2	
79	18 January 2000	Schneider Arena; Providence, RI	Brown	4	Providence	2	
80	4 November 2000	Meehan Auditorium; Providence, RI	Brown	5	No. 15 Providence	1	
81	22 January 2002	Schneider Arena; Providence, RI	Providence	4	Brown	3	
82	28 January 2003	Meehan Auditorium; Providence, RI	Providence	3	Brown	1	
83	25 November 2003	Schneider Arena; Providence, RI	Tie	1	Tie	1	(OT)
84	22 January 2005	Meehan Auditorium; Providence, RI	Brown	5	Providence	1	
85	3 December 2005	Schneider Arena; Providence, RI	Providence	5	Brown	1	
86	26 November 2006	Meehan Auditorium; Providence, RI	Brown	2	Providence	1	
87	4 December 2007	Schneider Arena; Providence, RI	Providence	8	Brown	0	
88	9 December 2008	Meehan Auditorium; Providence, RI	Providence	4	Brown	3	
89	17 November 2009	Schneider Arena; Providence, RI	Providence	4	Brown	3	
90	7 December 2010	Meehan Auditorium; Providence, RI	Tie	4	Tie	4	(OT)
91	1 January 2012	Schneider Arena; Providence, RI	Brown	5	Providence	2	
92	24 November 2012	Meehan Auditorium; Providence, RI	Providence	7	Brown	0	
93	30 November 2013	Schneider Arena; Providence, RI	No. 4 Providence	3	Brown	2	
94	9 January 2015	Meehan Auditorium; Providence, RI	No. 14 Providence	3	Brown	2	(OT)
95	10 January 2015	Schneider Arena; Providence, RI	Brown	5	No. 14 Providence	3	
96	10 December 2015	Schneider Arena; Providence, RI	No. 1 Providence	4	Brown	1	
97	3 January 2016	Meehan Auditorium; Providence, RI	Brown	4	No. 1 Providence	3	(OT)
98	30 October 2016	Meehan Auditorium; Providence, RI	No. 14 Providence	6	Brown	0	
99	3 January 2018	Schneider Arena; Providence, RI	No. 11 Providence	5	Brown	0	
100	29 December 2018	Thompson Arena; Hanover, NH	No. 10 Providence	3	Brown	1	Ledyard Bank Classic semifinal
101	15 January 2019	Meehan Auditorium; Providence, RI	No. 11 Providence	5	Brown	1	
102	30 November 2019	Schneider Arena; Providence, RI	No. 13 Providence	4	Brown	2	
103	27 November 2021	Meehan Auditorium; Providence, RI	No. 14 Providence	4	Brown	0	
104	26 November 2022	Schneider Arena; Providence, RI	Brown	3	No. 8 Providence	2	
105	30 December 2023	Meehan Auditorium; Providence, RI	No. 10 Providence	3	Brown	0	
106	7 January 2025	Meehan Auditorium; Providence, RI	No. 5 Providence	2	Brown	0	
107	9 December 2025	Meehan Auditorium; Providence, RI	No. 16 Providence	4	Brown	2	
Series: Providence leads 57–47–3

== Series facts ==
Statistic	Brown	Providence
Games played	106	
Wins	47	57
Home wins	18	23
Road wins	18	24
Neutral site wins	11	11
Goals scored	400	441
Most goals scored in a game by one team	12 (21 November 1952)	13 (6 March 1957)
Most goals in a game by both teams	19 (6 March 1957 – Providence 13, Brown 6)	
Fewest goals in a game by both teams	2 (25 November 2003)	
Fewest goals scored in a game by one team in a win	2 (26 November 2006)	2 (7 January 2025)
Most goals scored in a game by one team in a loss	6 (1957, 1964, 1976, 1988)	5 (1955, 1972, 1975, 1978, 1995)
Largest margin of victory	9 (2 December 1967)	9 (2 March 1961)
Longest winning streak	9 (23 February 1965 – 30 November 1968)	7 (2 December 1959 – 10 March 1962)
Longest unbeaten streak	9 (23 February 1965 – 30 November 1968)	7 (2 December 1959 – 10 March 1962)
