= Dirck Rembrantsz van Nierop =

Dutch mathematician (1610–1682)

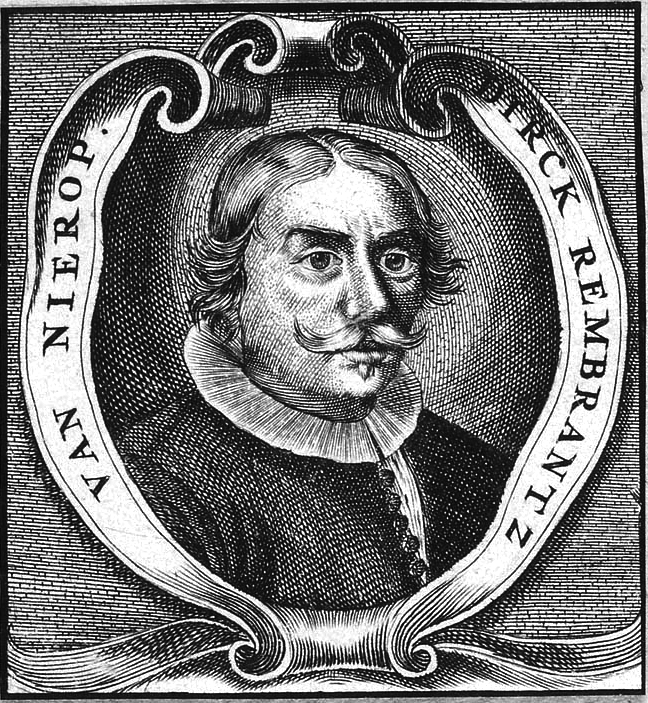
- Portrait of Dirck Rembrantsz van Nierop
- Born: 1610; Nieuwe Niedorp, North Holland, Dutch Republic
- Died: 4 November 1682 (aged 71–72); Nieuwe Niedorp, Dutch Republic
- Known for: Mathematical publications, navigational charts, and sundial designs
- Scientific career
- Fields: Mathematics, astronomy, cartography

Dirck Rembrantsz van Nierop (1610 – 4 November 1682) was a seventeenth-century Dutch cartographer, mathematician, surveyor, astronomer, shoemaker and Mennonite teacher.

== Life ==
Dirck Rembrantsz van Nierop was born in 1610 in Nieuwe Niedorp in North Holland. His patronymic name, Rembrantsz, indicates that his father was named Rembrandt, while the toponymic "van Nierop" refers to his place of origin near Nieuwe Niedorp.

Van Nierop came from a modest artisan background and initially worked as a shoemaker. Despite limited formal education and little knowledge of foreign languages, he developed an interest in mathematics and astronomy through self-study.

His growing reputation for mathematical ability brought him into contact with leading intellectual figures of the Dutch Republic. Van Nierop visited the philosopher René Descartes in Egmond-Binnen, who was sufficiently impressed by his knowledge to introduce him to scholars including Constantijn Huygens and the mathematician Frans van Schooten.

Although largely self-taught, Van Nierop became respected among mathematicians and navigators of the seventeenth century and took part in the broader network of scientific correspondence in the Dutch Republic.

== Career ==
He has more than thirty scientific publications to his name. He also has many designs of sundials to his name. In addition he was a consultant in the field of navigational charts and active for the Dutch VOC. He was the teacher of later celebrities such as:

- Jan Albertsz van Dam (teacher Czar Peter the Great, Hoorn 1717)
- Pieter Rembrantsz van Nierop (author of numerous books such as almanacs)
- Cornelis Pietersz Neuvel to Embden

== Books ==
- Eenige Oefeningen in Godlijcke, Wiskonstige dingen 1674 at the British Library
- Wiskonstige Musyka 1659 at the British Library
- Tydt beschrijvinge der Werelt 1654 at the National Library Stockholm Sweden
- Verklaringhe over de loop des Hemels 1658 at the University of Göttingen Germany
- Mathematische Calculatie 1659 DRvN and Edmund Wingate, French translation, Harvard University Cambridge Massachusetts USA
- Nieuw groot Stuurmans Zeespiegel 1683 at the Royal Library of Kopenhagen Denmark
- Nieuw Dubbelt Nierper GRAED-BOECK 1660 National Library Stockholm Sweden
- Libro delos grados 1668 publisher H. Doncker Amsterdam Biblioteca Nacional de Espana Madrid
- Nederduytsche Astronomia 1653 publisher Gerrit van Goedesbergh Amsterdam Staatsbibliotheek Berlin Germany
- Nederduytsche Astronomia 1658 publisher Gerrti van Goedesbergh Amsterdam Stanford University California USA
- Onderwys der Zee-vaert 1670 publisher H.Doncker Amsterdam Technische Universiteit Delft
- Nieropper Schatkamer 1676 publisher A.v.d.Storck Amsterdam Koninklijke Bibliotheek Den Haag
- Des Aertrycks-beweging en de Sonne-stilstand 1661 G.v.d.Goedesbergh Amsterdam Stadsarchief Antwerpen België

== Books (co-writer) ==
- Friesche Sterrekunst 1652 J. Holwarda Harlingen at the British Library
- Rekeningh om te Waecken 1674 J. Stichter Amsterdam Pierpont Morgan Library New York USA
- Kort onderwijs Der Horologien Christiaan Huygens 1665 Huygens Hofwijck Museum Voorburg Den Haag
- Noord en Oost Tartaryen Nicolaas Witsen 1702 Göttingen Documental Zentrum Germany
- Eerste Beginzelen van de Arithmetica of Rekenkunst voor Amsterdamse Schoolen A.Strabbe Amsterdam 1801 Universiteit Jena Germany

== Almanacs ==
- Zaagmans almanak 1673 publisher J. Stichter Amsterdam Zeeuwse Bibliotheken Middelburg
- Almanach nieuwen-stijl over acht jaren 1681 H. Doncker Amsterdam Universiteit Amsterdam
- Almanach nieuwen-stijl over acht jaren 1687 J. Lootsman Amsterdam Universiteit Leiden
- Almanach tien jaren 1651 Theunisz. Amsterdam Yale University New Haven Connecticut USA
- Almanach spaanstalig 1668 H. Doncker Amsterdam Brown University Providence Rhode Island USA

== Letters ==
- Wiskunde Christiaan Huygens Den Haag 10 mei 1659 Universiteit Amsterdam
- Cartografie Nicolaas Witsen Amsterdam 9 januari 1682 Universiteit Amsterdam
- Astronomie Hendrik Lanschot Middelburg 23 April 1682 Universiteit Amsterdam

== Exhibitions ==
- Tijdgebonden: Almanakken en Kalenders Koninklijke Bibliotheek Den Haag Netherland 2000 www.kb.nl.tijdgebonden.html
- Abel Tasman/DR van Nierop at Sydney Australia 2006
- Johan Hevelius/DR van Nierop at Dutch Uurwerkmuseum Zaandam Netherland 2007
- Het vinden der lengtegraad Oost en West at Dutch Uurwerkmuseum Zaandam Netherland 2008
- Almanakken en bijzondere boeken at Regionaal Archief Alkmaar Netherland 2009

== Sources ==
- van Nierops Europese Paskaart at report of Christiaan Huygens by Eric Schliesser Caert-Thresoor 4-1997
- Correspondence of letters Dirck Rembrantsz van Nierop by Rienk Vermij 1996 Regionaal Archief Alkmaar
- Mathematische Liefhebberij books yearly (1745–1762) University of Amsterdam
- Nederlands Cartesianisme book Louise Thijsse-Schouten 1954
- Zeewezen en wetenschap book 1985 C.A. Davids
- Oh dear time in 2000 A. Dekker
- The Play Car Edition 1949 and 1951 J. Baken
- Dirck Rembrantsz van Nierop J. Smit 1992 Winkel Catalog
- Inventarisatie werken Dirck Rembrantsz van Nierop Maart 2011 A. Ligthart Zaandam, Regionaal Archief Alkmaar
- Article Noordhollands Newspaper Edition Schagen, November 14, 2007
- The voyage of the Swedish steamer Vega around the world (Europe/Asia/North-East passage) 1878/1879 Adolf Erik Nordenskiöld 1885
