= Mayor Synagogue =

The denomination Mayor Synagogue may refer to:

- Mayor Synagogue, Istanbul, Turkey
- Mayor Synagogue, Bursa, Turkey
