= A Mayor of Delft and his Daughter =

1655 oil painting by Jan Steen

- Double portrait of Adolf Croeser and his daughter Catharina Croeser
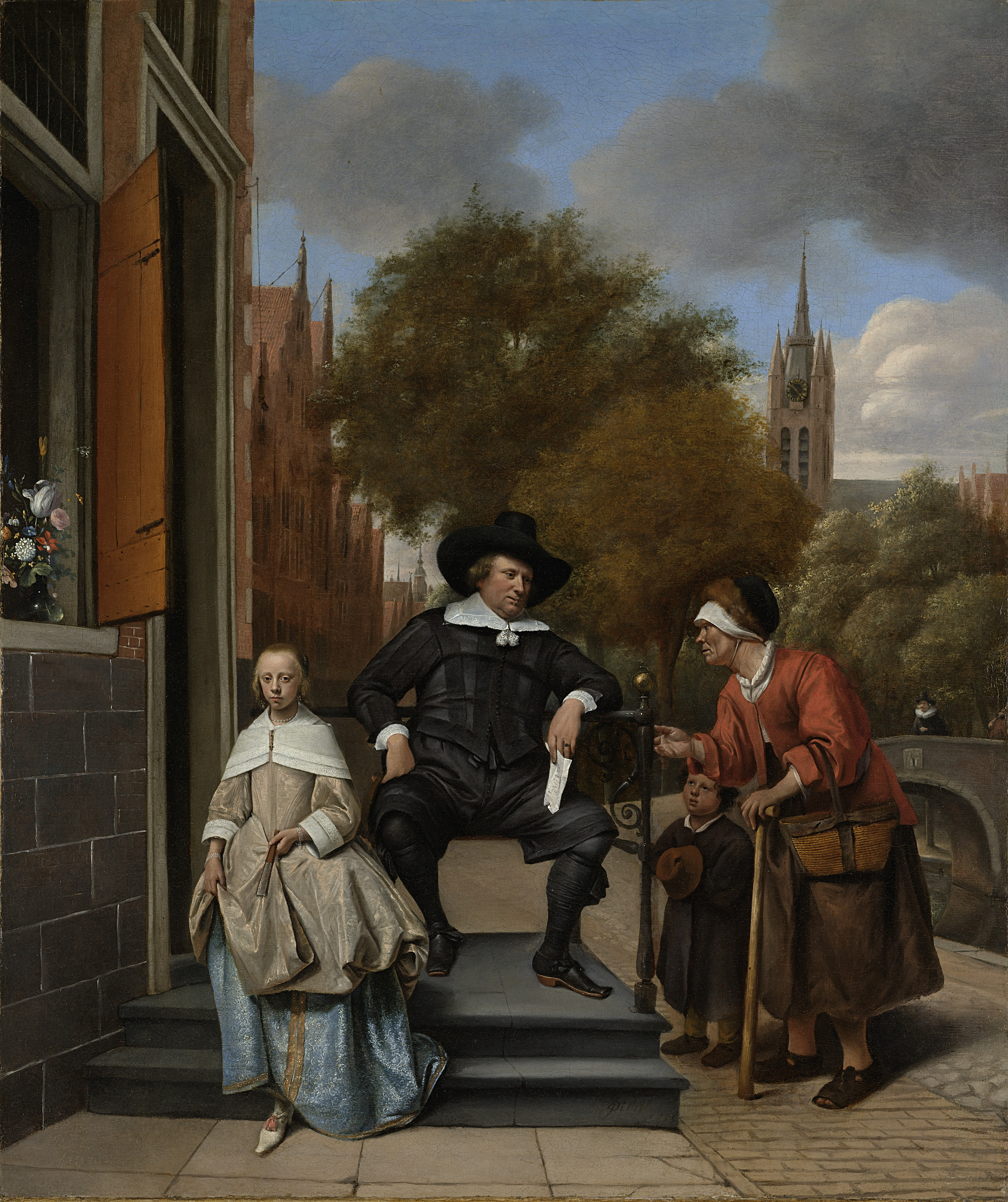
- Artist: Jan Steen
- Year: 1655
- Medium: canvas, oil paint
- Dimensions: 82.5 cm (32.5 in) × 68.7 cm (27.0 in)
- Location: Netherlands
- Collection: Rijksmuseum
- Accession No.: SK-A-4981
- Identifiers: RKDimages ID: 126751

A Mayor of Delft and his Daughter (1655) is the common name of an oil-on-canvas painting by the Dutch painter Jan Steen. It is an example of Dutch Golden Age painting and is part of the collection of the Rijksmuseum. Since 2006 it has been determined that a more historically correct title is Double portrait of Adolf Croeser (1612-1668) and his daughter Catharina Croeser (1642-....).

This painting was documented by Hofstede de Groot in 1910, who wrote:

878. SO-CALLED PORTRAIT OF THE BURGOMASTER OF DELFT AND HIS DAUGHTER. The man sits in the centre, upon the steps in front of his house; he holds a sheet of paper. His daughter descends two steps to the left towards the spectator. The man is dressed in black; the girl has a blue skirt and a greyish-purple gown. A beggar-woman in red, with a boy, addresses the man from the right. In the distance, to the right, is the tower of the Oude Kerk, at Delft; to the left of the man's head is seen a small tower. A stone bridge, bearing the arms of the town, leads over the Oude Delft. To the left, in the window of the house, is a bouquet of flowers in a glass. The house projects slightly in front of the other houses in the street. The foliage of trees covers part of the picture.

The picture is authentic, but not a masterpiece. The man's head is too large in relation to the girl. Since the sale of 1808 the picture has passed under the name of "The Burgomaster of Delft and his Daughter." If the tradition is correct, the persons represented are Geraldo Briel van Welhoeck (1593–1665) with his daughter Anna, who was born in 1638, and married in 1656 Adriaan Bogaert van Beloys. Signed in the full on the edge of a step, and dated 1655; canvas, 32 1/2inches by 27 inches. Exhibited at the Royal Academy Winter Exhibition, London, 1882, No. 238.

Sales. E. M. Engelberts and Tersteeg, Amsterdam, June 13, 1808, No. 142 (75 florins, Nieuwenhuys). Domsert, London, 1811 (88, Charlesson). Purchased by Edward, Lord Penrhyn, from the dealer, Nieuwenhuys. Now in the collection of Lord Penrhyn, Penrhyn Castle.

This painting was featured on the cover of Simon Schama's 1987 book The Embarrassment of Riches.

After over a century at Penrhyn Castle, the painting was sold to the Rijksmuseum in July 2004 for 11.9 million euros, the most expensive painting purchase for the museum. The British government delayed issuance of an export license to give British institutions the chance to buy the painting, but after the sole interested party withdrew their offer in August, the export license was issued.

In 2006 research on the portrayed Delft cityscape and the people portrayed resulted in a title change. It had already been assumed for over a century that the man in the painting was not the mayor of Delft.
