= Winkel, North Holland =

Winkel
- Village
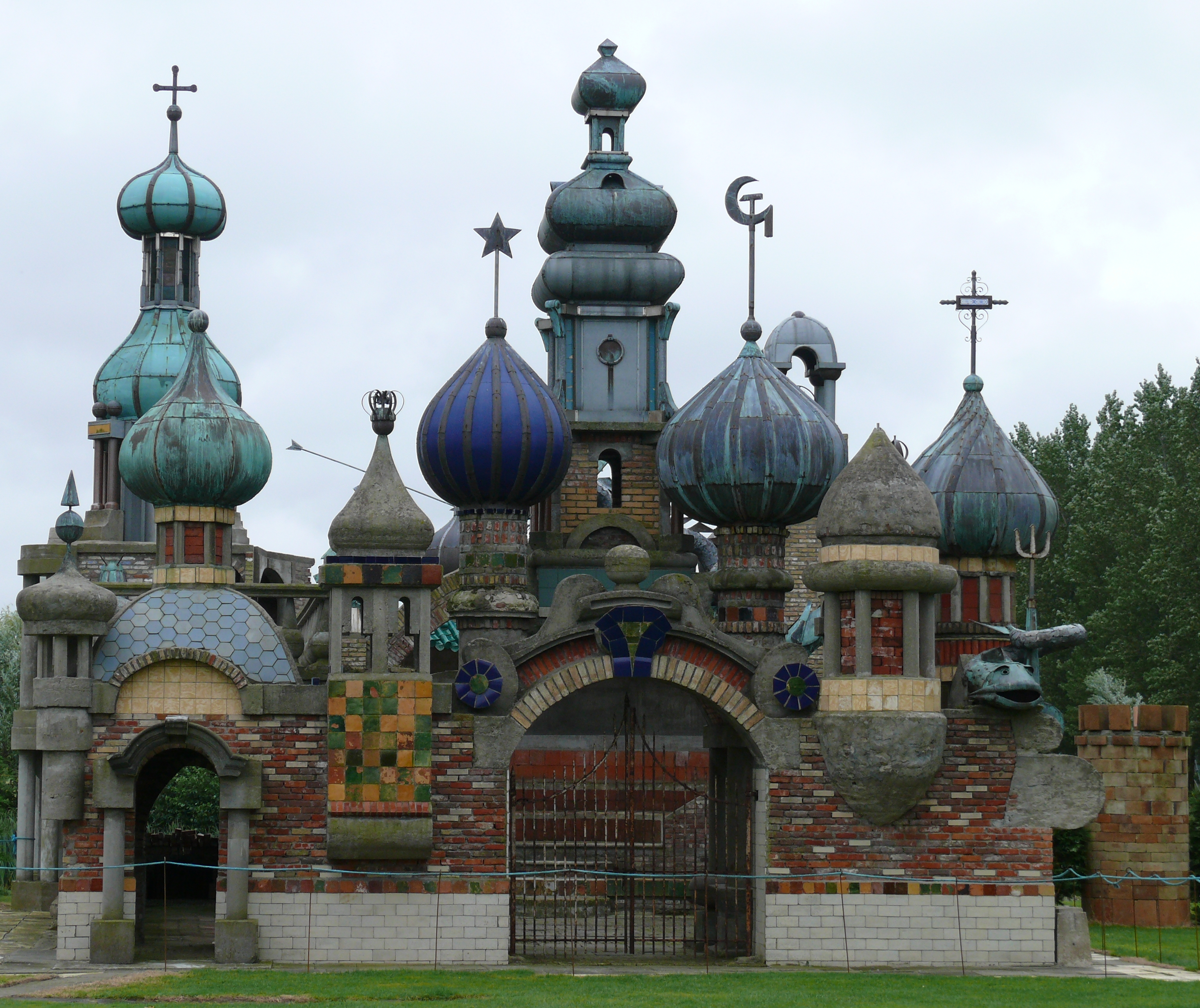
- The Kremlin of Winkel

- Coat of arms

- Location in the Netherlands Location in the province of North Holland in the Netherlands
- Coordinates: 52°45′7″N 4°54′13″E
- Country: Netherlands
- Province: North Holland
- Municipality: Hollands Kroon

Area
  - Village: 10.18 km^{2} (3.93 sq mi)
- Elevation: −0.3 m (−0.98 ft)

Population (2025)
  - Village: 3,495
  - Density: 343.3/km^{2} (889.2/sq mi)
  - Urban: 3,280
  - Rural: 215
- Time zone: UTC+1 (CET)
  - Summer (DST): UTC+2 (CEST)
- Postal code: 1731
- Dialing code: 0224

Winkel (Dutch pronunciation: [ˈʋɪŋkəl]) is a village in the Dutch province of North Holland. It is a part of the municipality of Hollands Kroon, and lies about 11 km north of Heerhugowaard.

== History ==
The village was first mentioned in 1289 as Winckele, and means "enclosed piece of land". Winkel developed in the Middle Ages as a peat excavation settlement. It was largely destroyed in 1519, and suffered a fire in 1649.

The Dutch Reformed church is an aisleless with needle spire in a neoclassic style. It was built 1845 as a replacement for the medieval church. The tower was rebuilt in 1867. The Kremlin is a garden with follies some of which are over 10 metres (33 ft) tall.

Winkel was home to 660 people in 1840. It was a separate municipality until 1970, when it was merged with Niedorp. In 2012, it became part of the municipality of Hollands Kroon.

== Gallery ==
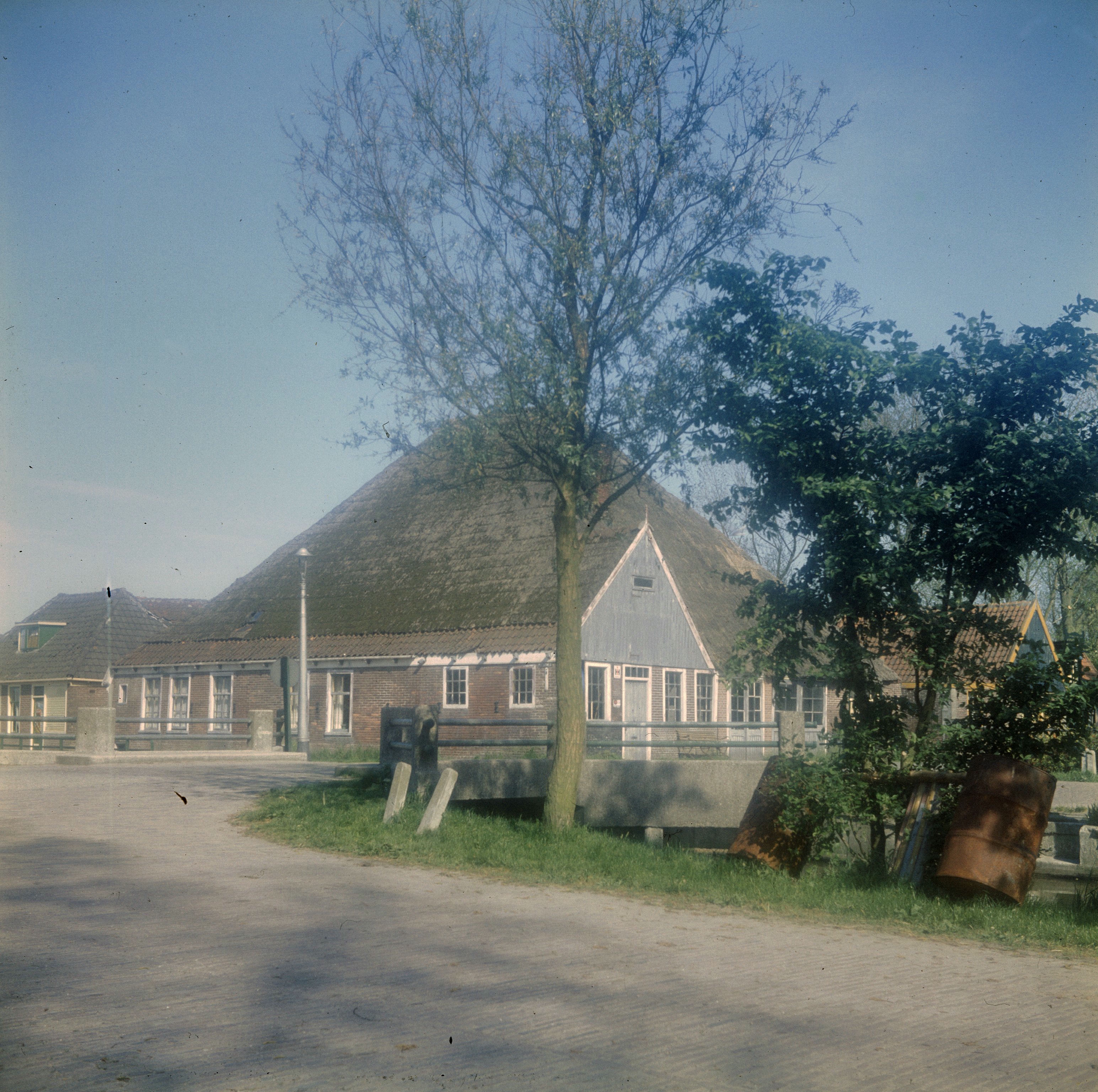
Former forge

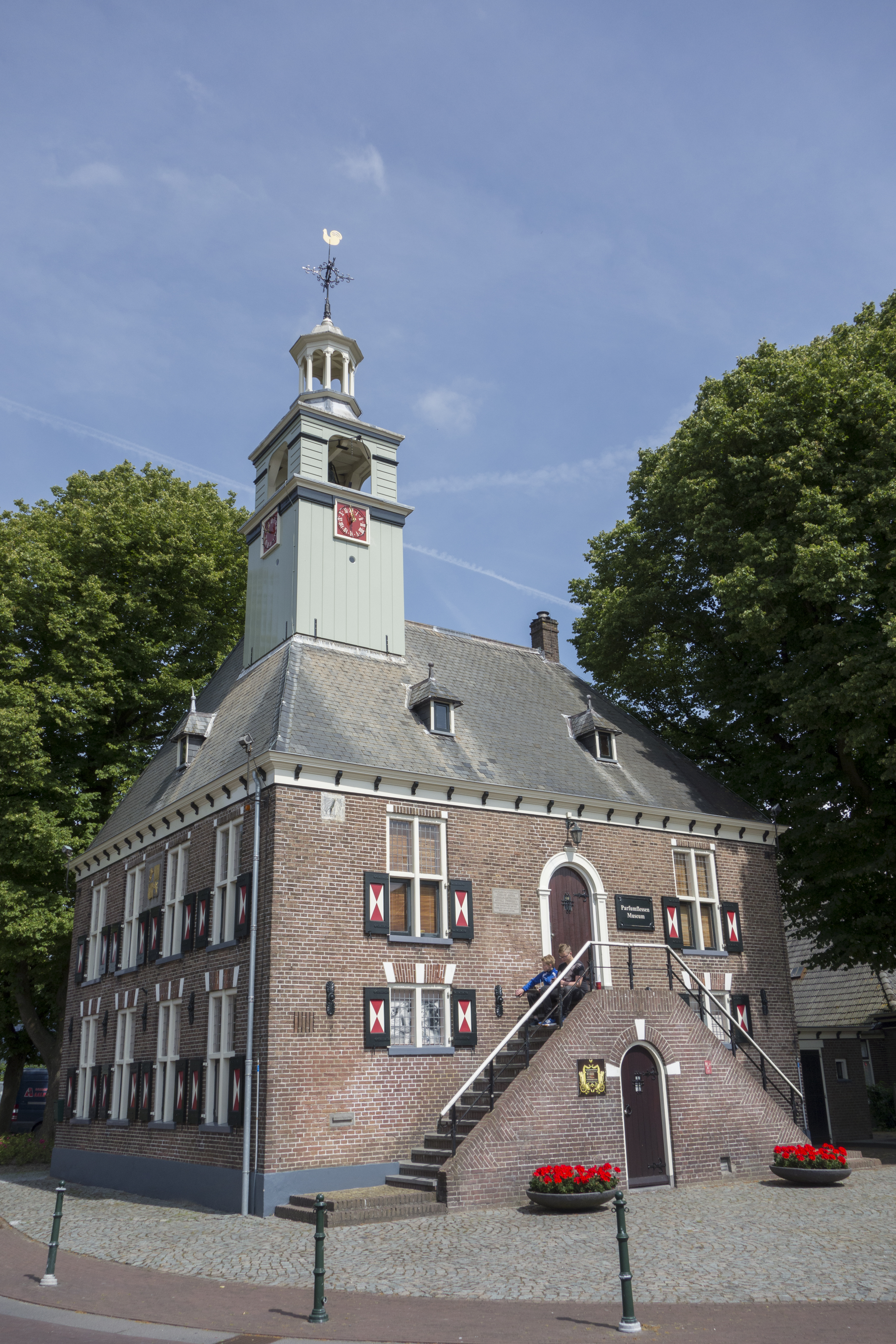
Former town hall

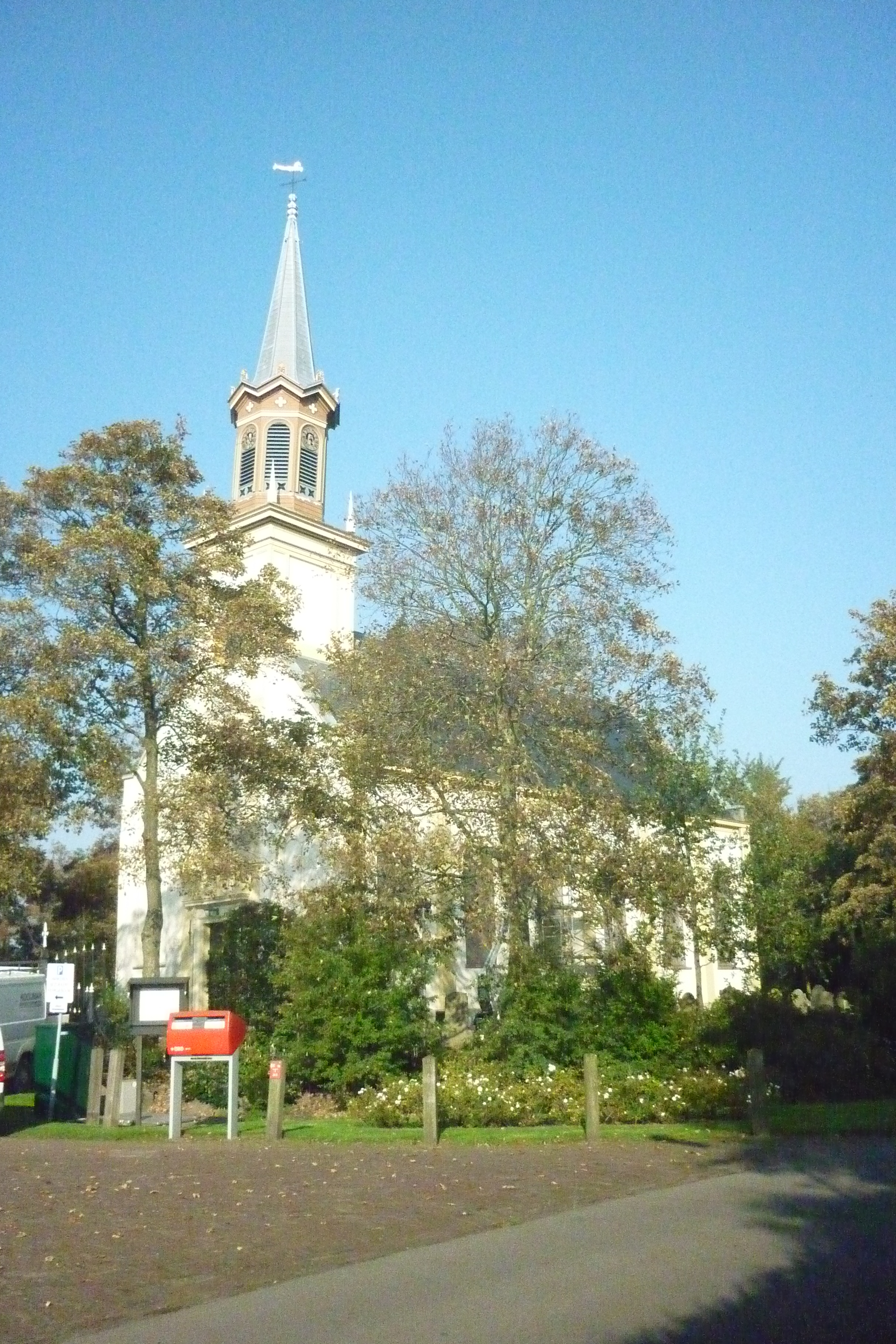
Dutch Reformed church
