= 2026 NCAA Division I men's ice hockey tournament =

- Teams: 16
- Finals site: T-Mobile Arena, Las Vegas, Nevada
- Champions: Denver Pioneers (11th title)
- Runner-up: Wisconsin Badgers (10th title game)
- Semifinalists: Michigan Wolverines (29th Frozen Four); North Dakota Fighting Hawks (23rd Frozen Four)
- Winning coach: David Carle (3rd title)
- MOP: Johnny Hicks (Denver)
- Attendance: 17,849 (Championship); 53,733 (Frozen Four); 113,817 (Tournament)

The 2026 NCAA Division I Men's Ice Hockey Tournament was the national championship tournament for National Collegiate Athletic Association (NCAA) men's Division I college ice hockey in the United States. Held from March 26 to April 11, 2026, the tournament involved a total 16 teams in single-elimination play to determine the national champion for the top level of play.

For the first time since 1981, none of the four programs that compete in the annual Beanpot tournament (Boston College, Boston University, Northeastern, and Harvard) qualified for the NCAA tournament. Dartmouth made its first tournament appearance since 1980, ending the longest active drought between tournament appearances and tying Yale for the longest gap between bids (46 years) in NCAA Division I men’s ice hockey history. As of 2026, the longest active drought since their last bid belongs to Alaska Anchorage, who has not appeared in the tournament since 1992 (34 years).

Michigan earned a record-extending 29th Frozen Four appearance with their 4–3 win in the Albany Regional Final over Minnesota-Duluth. Also, Denver became the 6th program in NCAA Division I history to earn 20 Frozen Four appearances following their 6–2 win in the Loveland Regional Final over defending champions Western Michigan.

Following their 4–3 overtime loss to Wisconsin in the Worcester Regional Final (a game in which they led 3–1 with five minutes remaining), Michigan State became the first program in the 16-team tournament era (since 2003) to hold a 1-seed for 3 consecutive tournaments without reaching the Frozen Four.

This year’s Frozen Four featured a multiple overtime matchup for the second year in a row, with both games involving Denver. Following a 3-2 double overtime semifinal loss to Western Michigan in 2025, Denver defeated Michigan 4-3 in a double overtime semifinal in 2026. Also in this year’s Frozen Four, Wisconsin became the first program in NCAA Division I history to advance to the National Championship game in seven straight Frozen Four appearances, with 1978 being the last time Wisconsin advanced to the Frozen Four without appearing in the title game. Denver ultimately defeated Wisconsin 2-1 in the National Championship to earn their NCAA record-extending 11th title and become the first program since Boston College in 2012 to win three titles in five years.

== Tournament procedure ==
2026 Regionals (blue) and Frozen Four (red)

The tournament was composed of four groups of four teams in regional brackets. The four regionals are named after the cities in which they take place. The following are the sites for the 2026 regionals:

Regional Semifinals and Finals

- March 26 & 28

Sioux Falls Regional, Denny Sanford Premier Center – Sioux Falls, South Dakota (Hosts: University of Nebraska Omaha and Sioux Falls Sports Authority)
Worcester Regional, DCU Center – Worcester, Massachusetts (Host: College of the Holy Cross)

- March 27 & 29

Albany Regional, MVP Arena – Albany, New York (Hosts: Union College and MVP Arena)
Loveland Regional, Blue Arena – Loveland, Colorado (Host: University of Denver and Budweiser Events)

National semifinals and championship (Frozen Four and championship)

- April 9 & 11

T-Mobile Arena – Las Vegas, Nevada (Hosts: University of North Dakota and Las Vegas Events)

Note: The Loveland Regional was awarded to the Budweiser Events Center, which was subsequently renamed as the Blue Arena prior to the start of tournament play.

== Qualifying teams ==
The at-large bids as well the seeding for each team in the tournament were announced on March 22, 2026, on ESPNU at 3:00 pm ET.

The Big Ten and NCHC each received four bids, ECAC Hockey and Hockey East received three bids, while Atlantic Hockey America and the CCHA received one bid apiece.

Albany Regional							Sioux Falls Regional						
Seed	School	Conference	Record	Berth type	Appearance	Last bid	Seed	School	Conference	Record	Berth type	Appearance	Last bid
1	Michigan (1)	Big Ten	29–7–1	Tournament champion	42nd	2024	1	North Dakota (2)	NCHC	27–9–1	At-large	36th	2024
2	Minnesota Duluth (8)	NCHC	23–14–1	At-large	16th	2022	2	Providence (7)	Hockey East	23–10–2	At-large	17th	2025
3	Penn State (9)	Big Ten	21–13–2	At-large	5th	2025	3	Quinnipiac (10)	ECAC Hockey	24–11–2	At-large	12th	2025
4	Bentley (16)	AHA	23–11–5	Tournament champion	2nd	2025	4	Merrimack (15)	Hockey East	21–15–2	Tournament champion	4th	2023
Worcester Regional							Loveland Regional						
Seed	School	Conference	Record	Berth type	Appearance	Last bid	Seed	School	Conference	Record	Berth type	Appearance	Last bid
1	Michigan State (3)	Big Ten	25–8–2	At-large	30th	2025	1	Western Michigan (4)	NCHC	26–10–1	At-large	11th	2025
2	Dartmouth (6)	ECAC Hockey	23–7–4	Tournament champion	5th	1980	2	Denver (5)	NCHC	25–11–3	Tournament champion	33rd	2025
3	Wisconsin (12)	Big Ten	21–12–2	At-large	28th	2024	3	Cornell (11)	ECAC Hockey	22–10–1	At-large	26th	2025
4	Connecticut (14)	Hockey East	20–12–5	At-large	2nd	2025	4	Minnesota State (13)	CCHA	22–10–7	Tournament champion	11th	2025

Number in parentheses denotes overall seed in the tournament.

== Bracket ==
Regional Semifinals; March 26–27
1	Michigan (1)	5
4	Bentley	1
Albany – MVP Arena – Fri/Sun
2	Minnesota Duluth	3
3	Penn State	1
1	Western Michigan (4)	3
4	Minnesota State	1
Loveland – Blue Arena – Fri/Sun
2	Denver	5
3	Cornell	0
1	North Dakota (2)	3
4	Merrimack	0
Sioux Falls – Denny Sanford Premier Center – Thu/Sat
2	Providence	2
3	Quinnipiac	5
1	Michigan State (3)	2
4	Connecticut	1
Worcester – DCU Center – Thu/Sat
2	Dartmouth	1
3	Wisconsin	5

Regional Finals; March 28–29
1	Michigan (1)	4
2	Minnesota Duluth	3
1	Western Michigan (4)	2
2	Denver	6
1	North Dakota (2)	5
3	Quinnipiac	0
1	Michigan State (3)	3
3	Wisconsin	4*

National Semifinals; April 9
A1	Michigan (1)	3
L2	Denver	4**
SF1	North Dakota (2)	1
W3	Wisconsin	2

National Championship; April 11
L2	Denver	2
W3	Wisconsin	1

Number in parentheses denotes overall seed in the tournament.
* denotes overtime period

== Results ==
Note: all game times listed are eastern.

=== Albany Region ===
==== Regional semifinals ====
March 27, 2026; 5:30 pm on ESPNU	(1) Michigan	5–1 (2–0, 2–0, 1–1)	(4) Bentley	MVP Arena; Attendance: 6,584

Game reference

Jack Ivankovic
Goalies
Lukas Swedin
Referees:
Cameron Lynch
Jason Williams
Linesmen:
Steve Drain
Adam Wood

(Perron) T. J. Hughes (21) – 9:49	1–0
(unassisted) Ben Robertson (1) – GW – 19:59	2–0
(Perron, Hughes) Nick Moldenhauer (15) – PP – 28:35	3–0
(Hughes, Schifsky) Kason Muscutt (3) – 30:49	4–0
(Duke, Hady) Garrett Schifsky (13) – 57:50	5–0
	5–1	59:33 – David Helledy (6) (Upson, Dalton)

12 min
Penalties
8 min
29
Shots
25

Game summary
Before the game had even started, Michigan announced that their top-line center Michael Hage would miss the game. Bentley kicked off the match with a rush into the Michigan end but they were unable to get a good look at the next. The puck see-sawed up and down the ice but both defenses were able to keep the attackers to the outside for the first several minutes. The first good scoring chance came about three and a half minutes in when Jayden Perron fired a low shot from the right circle but Lukas Swedin made the save with his leg. After a second chance for Michigan from T. J. Hughes was stopped at the 6-minute mark, Bentley got its first good look off of a turnover but Jack Ivankovic was able to stop the attempt from Arlo Merritt. After Bentley was able to put some pressure on the Michigan cage, Michigan countered with a rush and gave Luca Fantilli an open shot on goal. Swedin held firm and snagged the puck with his glove. The middle of the period saw Michigan continually attacking but Bentley's players collapsed back and prevented the Wolverines from setting up in the offensive zone. Just before the midway point of the period, Perron grabbed a clearing attempt with his glove just inside the Bentley zone. He then slid the puck over to Hughes who fired it under Swedin's glove for the game's opening marker. Bentley went on the attack on the ensuing faceoff and drew a hooking call on Dakoda Rheaume-Mullen. Despite some sloppy play from the 39th-ranked penalty kill, Michigan was able to limit Bentley to a low-percentage shots and retain their lead. After the penalty expired, the back and forth play resumed with the two sides limited to singular chances before the puck was either cleared or frozen for a faceoff. Both defenses played hard in their own zones while the attackers were looking more for good scoring chances than just trying to get the puck on goal. With less than 3 minutes left in the period, Michigan was finally able to establish itself in the Falcons' end, however, Bentley kept the Wolverines away from the goal and allowed Swedin to stop a long shot by Tyler Duke from the point. Just before the end of the period, Ben Robertson was carrying the puck out of the Michigan end and he looked up at the clock to check the time. He then skated the puck forward and, as soon as he got to the Bentley blueline, he fired a hard wrist shot between two Falcon defenders. Swedin raised his glove to grab the puck but it sailed just below the outstretched trapper and into the net for a shocking goal, his first of the season.

Now down by 2, Bentley got right back to the attack at the start of the second period. Play again see-sawed between the two sides for the first few minutes but when Chase Davis attempted to collapse down low and help out defensively, he lost and edge and ran into Swedin. Michigan got possession of the puck while the cage was unoccupied but could not get the rubber into a shooting position before Swedin regain his footing. However, in order to prevent an open look at the goal, Tobias Larsen was forced to take a holding penalty. Michigan's #1 power play got several good shots on the Bentley cage but Swedin held firm and the Falcons were able to clear the puck and prevent a follow up chance. After the penalty expired, Jake Black put a hard shot on goal off the rush. Ivankovic made the save but Oliver Salo crashed the crease and bodied the Michigan netminder to the ice. While the Wolverines called for a penalty, none was forthcoming. A few minutes later, Salo was handed a minor penalty when he was called for interference on Kason Muscutt. Michigan's offensive firepower was on full display on their second man-advantage. Will Horcoff and Perron had several good looks on goal but it was Nick Moldenhauer who found the back of the net after the Wolverines completely wore out the Bentley defenders. Bentley went on the attack once more, desperately trying to close the gap and managed to force a couple of offensive zone draws. Michigan, however, did not give the Falcons much to work with. On one of the Wolverines' counters up the ice, the puck was deflected into the corner behind the goal. Hughes jumped on the puck and backhanded out in front, sending the rubber into Muscutt's body where it rebounded towards the goal. While the puck probably would have entered the cage under its own power, Muscutt made sure by smacking it into the back of the net. After exchanging chances, Bentley got its chance on the power play when Duke was called for boarding. While most of the man-advantage went by the wayside, Bentley did get a tremendous scoring chance when Davis fired one on goal from the half wall. Ivankovic made the stop but the puck rebounded off of his stick right onto Salo's stick but the Finnish forward could not get his shot around the Michigan goaltender. Though they failed on their chance, the Falcons kept coming with both David Helledy and Garrett Horsager getting chances for a goal, however, Ivankovic stopped the former and a defensive wall provided by the Michigan skaters stopped the second. After a TV timeout, the Wolverines tilted the game back in their favor but Bentley would not go away. After Ivankovic stopped a Kellan Hjartarson shot, Black was nearly able to get his stick on the biscuit with a yawning cage in front but he overskated the puck. At time was counting down, Drew Schock broke towards the Bentley cage on a partial breakaway but Swedin made the save.

Bentley was again the aggressors at the start of the period but were still unable to get the puck past Ivankovic. However, less than a minute in the Falcons were able to force Cole McKinney into taking a holding call, granting them a third power play. Once again, the Falcons could not take advantage of Michigan's mediocre penalty kill and even surrendered a rush up the ice that saw Swedin having to stop a Garrett Schifsky backhand with his mask. Though Michigan was no longer pinching in the offensive zone, they were nonetheless able to get their shots thanks to Bentley being forced to push everything to the offense. Just before the 5-minute mark, Duke got mixed up behind his own goal with Michael Mesic and both were given roughing minors. The open ice gave both teams a chance to get the puck on goal but no goals were forthcoming. After the penalty box was emptied, Michigan continued to hold Bentley back until the Falcons iced the puck with just over 12 minutes to play. The Wolverines won the ensuing faceoff and Duke found Schifsky with a rink-wide pass and the junior fired the puck under Swedin right arm for Michigan fifth goal. Though the game was all but over by this point, Bentley refused to quit and went right at the Michigan cage. With under 10 minutes to play, Duke was called for holding and gave Bentley a fourth man-advantage. At the end of the power play, Salo put a long shot on goal that got behind Ivankovic but the Michigan goalie was able to cover the puck before any of the Falcons could follow up the attempt. Malcolm Spence had an opportunity to increase Michigan's lead with about 3 minutes to play but his shot hit a discarded stick and jumped up into Swedin's body. Bentley then did their best to finally get on the scoresheet but Ivankovic refused to budge. With 2 minutes left, Swedin was again tested and stopped a hard drive from Schock. In the final minute of play, Spence and Black were whistled for matching interference penalties. With under 30 seconds, Bentley finally broke through when Helledy fired a puck through Ivankovic, ending the shutout bid but the final result was unaffected.

March 27, 2026; 9:00 pm on ESPN2	(2) Minnesota Duluth	3–1 (1–1, 0–0, 2–0)	(3) Penn State	MVP Arena; Attendance: 6,584

Game reference

Adam Gajan
Goalies
Joshua Fleming
Referees:
Jeremy Tufts
Steven Rouillard
Linesmen:
Shane Kanaly
Jack McQuesten

	0–1	08:37 – Shea Van Olm (9) (Aman, Gadowsky)
(Z. Plante, Hanson) Max Plante (25) – 15:01	1–1
(Siepmann) Hunter Anderson (7) – GW – 54:47	2–1
(M. Plante) Ty Hanson (9) – EN – 19:59	3–1

2 min
Penalties
2 min
39
Shots
30

Game summary

==== Regional final ====
March 29, 2025; 5:30 pm on ESPN	(1) Michigan	4–3 (3–0, 0–0, 1–3)	(2) Minnesota Duluth	MVP Arena; Attendance: 5,751

Game reference

Jack Ivankovic
Goalies
Adam Gajan
Referees:
Joe Carusone
CJ Hanafin
Linesmen:
Patrick Dapuzzo
Ryan Knapp

(Robertson, McKinney) Will Horcoff (25) – 3:05	1–0
(Moldenhauer, Rheaume-Mullen) Adam Valentini (11) – PP – 11:24	2–0
(unassisted) Garrett Schifsky (14) – SH – 12:33	3–0
	3–1	40:36 – Harper Bentz (6) (Z. Plante, Shaugabay)
(Spence, Robertson) Jayden Perron (17) – GW – 43:07	4–1
	4–2	50:24 – PP – Ty Hanson (10) (Z. Plante, M. Plante)
	4–3	56:56 – Scout Truman (14) (Gaffney, Anderson)

8 min
Penalties
4 min
27
Shots
33

Game summary
Michigan's Michael Hage returned to the lineup for this match but it was the second line that got the game's first goal. Just past the 3-minute mark, Ben Robertson fired a puck from the left point and Will Horcoff, who was standing in the left circle, deflected the shot. The puck eluded Adam Gajan and bounced in off of the far post. Both teams had further chances during a fast-paced first period that saw very few stoppages in the first 8 minutes. Near the middle of the period the hitting picked up and Brady Cleveland tattooed Adam Valentini into the boards. A moment later Kienan Draper did the same with Callum Arnott and forced Arnott to leave the game with an apparent injury. On a faceoff after the hits, Daniel Shlaine was called for holding and gave Michigan's #1 power play its first chance. UMD was able to kill off the first half of the man-advantage but the Wolverines second unit set up quickly in the zone. Nick Moldenhauer found Valentini with a cross-crease pass and the freshman one-timed the puck off of Gajan's wrist and into the goal. Off of an offensive zone draw immediately after their second goal, Kason Muscutt was called for interference, giving Minnesota Duluth their first shot with a man up. Michigan quickly cleared the puck and then, with Duluth bringing the puck out of their zone, Garrett Schifsky jumped on a blind drop pass by Ty Hanson. The Wolverine forechecker skated around Jayson Shaugabay, stickhandled right in front of the cage and slid the puck five-hole for Michigan's third marker of the period. After killing off the remainder of the penalty, Duluth continued to press in the Michigan end and they were able to force Horcoff into committing a hooking infraction. Duluth was far better on their second chance, getting several good looks on goal. Hanson beat Jack Ivankovic on a shot from the point but the puck clanked off the bar and stayed out. Max Plante then rifled a one-timer from the right circle but Ivankovic was able to slide over in time to keep the Bulldogs off the scoresheet.

When the second period began Arnott was not on Duluth's bench, leaving the Bulldogs without their #2 center. Max Plante got the period's first grade-A chance on a breakaway after Luca Fantilli coughed up the puck. The Bulldogs forward deked Ivankovic and beat the goaltender but the backhand shot hit the post and rebounded out the other side. Michigan rushed up the ice for a counter attack and Gajan was forced to make a pair of outstanding saves on T. J. Hughes and Jayden Perron to keep UMD in the match. Duluth continued to press, looking to close the gap and got several good chances to score but they could not get the puck into the goal. Duluth's necessary focus on offense allowed Michigan to get chances and on one such break, Max Plante hauled down Schifsky and put Michigan back on the power play. This time Duluth's #2 penalty kill was able to keep the Wolverines from scoring and keep the gap at three. Both teams exchanged rushes but Michigan's defense held the Bulldogs back and prevented them from getting a shot on goal for over 10 minutes. Towards the end of the Period, Duluth's offense got back on track and Max Plante got a open look right in front of the goal but his shot hit Ivankovic in the left pad and bounced away. UMD continued to forecheck and Schifsky was handed a cross checking penalty for leveling Scout Truman. Duluth kept the pressure on in the final 90 seconds but was still unable to earn a goal.

Just after Michigan killed off the end of the penalty in the third, UMD finally found the back of the net. Zam Plante found Harper Bentz streaking towards the cage and the sophomore put a hard shot past Ivankovic's blocker. Duluth continued to attack but on one of Michigan's counters, Perron made an attempted pass across the crease. Hanson blocked the puck with a stick sweep but the rubber bounced in Michigan's favor. Perron slammed the biscuit into a half-open cage as Gajan had gone with the pass. Past the 5-minute mark, Duluth got another chance to close the gap but no one could get a stick on a loose puck in front of a half-open cage before it was cleared. Over the next five minutes, Michigan was able to keep Duluth away from the net but a turnover near the middle of the period forced Asher Barnett to take down Max Plante and Duluth was given its third shot with the power play. For the second time in the period, Zam Plante found an open Bulldogs charging at the net, this time in the form of Hanson. The sophomore made one deke and lifted the puck over Ivankovic's glove to cut the lad back to two. Minnesota Duluth increased the pressure in the offensive zone and Michigan was barely holding on at this point. After a TV timeout, the Wolverines had caught their breath and got back to playing a defensive shell. Duluth was able to force an offensive zone draw with less than 4 minutes to play and, after Kyle Gaffney was stopped by Ivankovic, Truman buried a pass off the rebound. Michigan challenged the play for goaltender interference as Gaffney had crashed the crease and bumped into Ivankovic. The play was reviewed for a long time before the referees decided that there was not enough to overturn the play and allowed the goal to stand. With about two and ahalf minutes to play, Max Plante had a tremendous chance to tie the score but his shot went right into Ivankovic's chest. With 90 seconds to play, Gajan was pulled for an extra attacker. Duluth had to block two long attempts at the vacated cage before getting their next chance to tie. After Ivankovic stopped a point shot from Hanson, the goaltender was swimming on the ice but Zam Plante, who grabbed the puck below the goal lone, could not find an open stick in front of the net. Duluth had one more chance to score in the waning moments but the puck jumped over Adam Kleber stick and slid harmlessly into the corner. Michigan gathered in the lose puck and was able to kill of the remainder of the clock, escaping with a win.

=== Sioux Falls Region ===
==== Regional semifinals ====
March 26, 2026; 8:30 pm on ESPN2	(1) North Dakota	3–0 (1–0, 0–0, 2–0)	(4) Merrimack	Denny Sanford Premier Center; Attendance: 5,114

Game reference

Jan Špunar
Goalies
Max Lundgren
Referees:
Colin Kronforst
Bruce Vida
Linesmen:
Nick Huff
Patrick Giles

(Zellers, Strathmann) Cody Croal (8) – GW – 3:52	1–0
(Rickwood, Zellers) Dylan James (20) – 54:09	2–0
(Emery) Cody Croal (9) – EN – 59:16	3–0

2 min
Penalties
6 min
28
Shots
31

Game summary

March 26, 2026; 5:00 pm on ESPN+	(2) Providence	2–5 (0–0, 0–3, 2–2)	(3) Quinnipiac	Denny Sanford Premier Center; Attendance: 5,114

Game reference

Jack Parsons
Goalies
Dylan Silverstein
Referees:
Andrew Bruggeman
Sam Fernandez
Linesmen:
Sam Shikowsky
Tommy George

	0–1	25:55 – Elliott Groenewold (7) (Vidicek, Marcellus)
	0–2	34:38 – Chris Pelosi (18) (Verreault, Czerneckianair)
	0–3	38:05 – GW – Antonin Verreault (16) (Borgula, Czerneckianair)
(Adams) Logan Sawyer (14) – 50:12	1–3
(Masa, Sawyer) John Mustard (17) – 54:02	2–3
	2–4	58:46 – EN – Ethan Wyttenbach (25) (Blace)
	2–5	59:25 – EN – Graham Sward (5) (unassisted)

23 min
Penalties
10 min
25
Shots
38

Game summary

==== Regional final ====
March 28, 2026; 7:00 pm on ESPN2	(1) North Dakota	5–0 (3–0, 2–0, 0–0)	(3) Quinnipiac	Denny Sanford Premier Center; Attendance: 6,209

Game reference

Jan Špunar
Goalies
Dylan Silverstein
Matej Marinov
Referees:
Andrew Bruggeman
Sean Fernandez
Linesmen:
Sam Shikowsky
Tommy George

(Zellers) Jack Kernan (10) – GW – 6:02	1–0
(Young, Wiebe) Cody Croal (10) – 8:14	2–0
(Wiebe) Jack Kernan (11) – 12:20	3–0
(Zellers, Rickwood) Dylan James (21) – 24:08	4–0
(Strinden, Swanson) Cole Reschny (6) – 31:31	5–0

6 min
Penalties
8 min
29
Shots
22

Game summary

=== Worcester Region ===
==== Regional semifinals ====
March 26, 2026; 1:50 pm on ESPN2	(1) Michigan State	2–1 (1–1, 1–0, 0–0)	(4) Connecticut	DCU Center; Attendance: 4,018

Game reference

Trey Augustine
Goalies
Tyler Muszelik
Referees:
Ryan Hersey
Nathan Wieler
Linesmen:
Erik Contino
Tyler Landman

	0–1	15:27 – Tabor Heaslip (7) (Muldowney, Allain-Samaké)
(Martone, Basgall) Ryker Lee (15) – PP – 18:56	1–1
(Shoudy) Porter Martone (25) – GW – 31:54	2–1

14 min
Penalties
10 min
42
Shots
22

Game summary
The game got off to a late start when one of the glass panes was broken during warmups and had to be replaced. After a 20-minute reprieve the match got underway and UConn set a physical tone early when Jake Richard laid a heavy check on Ryker Lee. Michigan State's Cayden Lindstrom tried to respond in kind about a minute later but he ended up getting called for a cross check and handed the Huskies the game's first power play. The man-advantage was fairly sedate at the start with Connecticut not shooting and the Spartans seemingly content to let them hold the puck around the edge. After the penalty expired, UConn got its first good scoring chance when Jake Percival broke in on goal and tried to beat Trey Augustine five-hole but the All-American netminder made the save. Porter Martone responded in kind after the ensuing faceoff but Tyler Muszelik proved equal to the task. The hits kept coming with both teams not willing to concede physically. At the same time, the defenses refocused and stopped either team from establishing any offensive zone time. After the first TV timeout of the match, MSU was able to get the puck out in front of the UConn cage but they could not corral a bouncing biscuit before it was pounced on by Muszelik. Connecticut found back near the middle of the period and Tabor Heaslip got a shot off in close but the game remained scoreless. One feature of the match at this time was the Huskies tendency to crash down on the MSU cage and crowd Augustine even after the puck was frozen. Despite coming in as the underdog, UConn was the team that led the shot total early thanks to a raft of attempts from the outside. Just past the 13-minute mark Eric Nilson got his stick between Jake Richard's legs and gave Connecticut its second power play. The MSU defense didn't give the Huskies any opportunities and killed off the penalty without much fuss. However, just 20 seconds afterwards, Joey Muldowney fired a rather harmless shot on goal from the right wing boards. Augustine came out to make a routine save but kicked the rebound right into the high slot and Heaslip was able to fire the puck into a vacated cage for the game's opening goal. Shortly after the goal, MSU took another penalty when Lindstrom was called for hitting from behind. UConn's third man-advantage was far better than the second and a cross-crease pass set up Alexandre Blais for a wide-open shot on goal but Augustine's glove kept the puck out. As the penalty expired, UConn was caught when Ethan Gardula pushed Nilson to the ice after the whistle and was called for roughing. The nation's top power play got its first chance to shine and got several looks right way. Lee then skated the puck from the blue line all the way down to the cage and, just when Muszelik went for a poke-check, the MSU forward pulled the puck back and popped over the netminder's shoulder to tie the score. The physical play continued for the rest of the period but both teams remained just on the right side of the law.

Connecticut got the first rush at the start of the second but Michigan State quickly turned momentum back in their favor an logged a pair of scoring chances. The game see-sawed for the next few minutes with both getting chances on goal. After the 4-minute mark, Charlie Stramel crashed the UConn cage after Muszelik cleared a loose puck and ran into the Huskie netminder. Stramel's goaltender interference penalty gave Connecticut another chance that they failed to capitalize on. At the end of the man-advantage, the puck deflected to center and Daniel Russell got a breakaway from center ice. Carlin Dezainde hooked Russell before the MSU forward could get a good shot and the referees awarded Russell a penalty shot. Russell skated in at a leisurely pace and made his attempt in tight hit shot hit Muszelik in the shin and the game remained tied at 1-all. UConn started applying pressure after the save and began to generate offense in the MSU end. The Huskies got a few good looks on goal but the puck either went wide or was stopped by Augustine. After an icing call, MSU was able to turn momentum in its favor and get several scoring chances. Near the middle of the period, the puck came in on the UConn cage and got lost in Muszelik's feet. While both sides searched for a loose puck, Muszelik laid flat on the ice and ended up getting a whistle to stop play. A few minutes later, Maxim Štrbák coughed up the puck in his own zone which led to two glorious chances for the Huskies. Augustine was able to stop both but then matching slashing calls were handed out to Ryan Tattle and Nilson. During the 4-on-4 time, UConn controlled the puck initially but a bad turnover by Mike Murtagh in his own end allowed Tiernan Shoudy to find a wide-open Porter Martone off to the left side of the net for Michigan State's first lead of the game. Both sides got back to alternating chances once 5-on-5 play resumed. Just before the 15-minute mark, Richard got free in the slot and tried find a clean shot past Augustine but his attempt went wide. A moment later, a second chance from the slot was prevented when Gavin O'Connell hooked the UConn forward and gave the Huskies their fifth power play of the match. It wasn't until the final moments of the man-advantage that UConn was able to get a good scoring chance. While they ultimately failed to convert, Connecticut was finally able to generate some momentum on their chance. With about two minutes to play, MSU got a chance to score with a wraparound off of an offensive-zone faceoff. Right after the save, both teams were again handed minor penalties, this time to Lee and Anthony Allain-Samaké, and a second 4-on-4 ensued. Connecticut again remained in control of the puck for the majority of the time but could not get a good scoring chance.

Both teams came out hitting in the third while their defenses were called upon to stop multiple chances before the puck got on goal. After a hand-pass forced a faceoff in the MSU end, UConn was able to get a good shot from the point but their inability to generate anything of consequence down low was harming their chances to score. A few minutes later, Richard walked the puck down the goal line and had an attempt inside the crease but could not beat Augustine. Unfortunately, that brief chance was not followed up and the MSU defense was able to push the Huskies to the outside once more. Patrick Geary and Matt Basgall were conspicuous in Michigan State's efforts and became increasingly important as MSU played a defensive shell in the third period. By the 8-minute mark, the Spartans had failed to record a single shot and were apparently trying to win the game 2–1. Near the middle of the frame, Richard got his stick under Anthony Romani's arm. Romani pinched down to made sure the referees were aware and MSU was rewarded with their second power play of the game. MSU put several good shots on goal and had at last as many near-misses but the UConn penalty kill was able to hold. As soon as Richard left the box, Connecticut got right back on the attack and tried to equalize the score. With just over 7 minutes to play, Stramel found a loose puck in the UConn end and no one between him and the netminder. He did a quick stickhandle before letting his shot go but the puck went wide. MSU then went on the attack, hemming the Huskies in their own zone until about 5 minutes to play. With time ticking away, Connecticut was becoming increasingly desperate and were forced to put all their energies towards scoring. An icing call with 3 minutes to play gave UConn an offensive zone faceoff and nearly resulted in a goal by Tattle, but his shot was stopped by the skate of Owen West. A further icing with just over 2 minutes to play resulted in UConn pulling its goaltender for an extra skater. Michigan State won the faceoff and almost scored twice into an open cage but the Huskies were able to escape disaster. Another long shot by the Spartans ended with another icing with 82 seconds left and UConn called its time out to try and set up a scoring play. Just before the faceoff, Michigan State then called their time out to make sure everyone in green and white knew what to do. Michigan State was able to get control and clear the zone and then then stop the Huskies from getting a good look. With about 3 seconds to play, Tattle found Richard right in front of the net for a tremendous chance but Augustine was able to stop the shot and preserve MSU's lead for the win.

March 26, 2026; 5:20 pm on ESPNU	(2) Dartmouth	1–5 (1–1, 0–0, 0–4)	(3) Wisconsin	DCU Center; Attendance: 4,018

Game reference

Emmett Croteau
Goalies
Daniel Hauser
Referees:
Brandon Schmitt
Nick Krebsbach
Linesmen:
Chris Williams
Kyle Stephens

	0–1	2:52 – PP – Simon Tassy (12) (Finley, Dexheimer)
(Grable, MacDonald) Hank Cleaves (18) – 10:05	1–1
	1–2	49:47 – GW – Jack Horbach (3) (Zelenov, Phelan)
	1–3	54:17 – Simon Tassy (13) (Botterill, Tulk)
	1–4	56:18 – EN – Christian Fitzgerald (16) (Finley)
	1–5	57:53 – EN – Quinn Finley (16) (unassisted)

4 min
Penalties
6 min
14
Shots
28

Game summary
The game began with Dartmouth getting the first rush up the ice but the Wisconsin defense was able to prevent a good shot on goal. The Badgers then began to take control and establish some offensive zone time. Just past the 2-minute mark, Joe Palodichuk put a solid shot on goal but Emmett Croteau made the save. A few seconds later, Dartmouth was called for too-many men and gave Wisconsin the first power play of the night. Off of the faceoff, Quinn Finley put a hard shot on goal that Croteau snatched with his glove. Wisconsin won the next faceoff as well and after passing the puck around the outside, put it to the front of the net. Finley's pass to Simon Tassy was partially deflected by Eric Charpentier and forced Croteau to make a desperation save with his toe. However, the netminder could not control the rebound and Tassy poked the puck beneath his leg for the opening tally. Wisconsin continued to pressure after scoring and forced several turnovers at center ice. The Big Green were eventually able to even out play and force an offensive zone faceoff but Wisconsin, who had an early edge in the dot, was swiftly able to work the puck up the ice. After the 5-minute mark, Finley nearly doubled his team's lead when he hit the crossbar from the high slot. When the game was paused for its first TV timeout around the 7-minute mark, Wisconsin was in complete control of the match and had credit for all 6 shots to that point. After the ensuing faceoff, Dartmouth finally got the puck on goal and nearly scored on a follow up attempt when Cam MacDonald's one-timer hit the post instead of a wide-open net. After turning over the puck in their own zone, Dartmouth got on an odd-man rush just after the midway point of the period and Hank Cleaves threw a shot against the grain to tie the score. Both teams probed for their chances afterwards but were unable to get a good look on goal for the next several minutes. Dartmouth appeared to have trouble staying on its skates as several players fell to the ice without any help from a Badger. Wisconsin was finally able to get some time in the Dartmouth end after an icing but even then, the Big Green defense was able to hold them to the outside. At the 15-minute mark, it was Wisconsin's turn to take an administrative penalty when Vasily Zelenov was called for a faceoff violation. On the ensuing power play, Dartmouth turned the puck over in its own end and gave a tremendous chance to Finley but Croteau stopped the shot with his blocker. After killing off the penalty, Wisconsin was able to force Dartmouth into another turnover in the Big Green's end but they could not get a good shot on goal. With less than 100 seconds to play, the Badgers' attack put the puck on goal and nearly got a lucky bounce past Croteau but the goaltender managed to get a whistle while sitting on the ice. The defenses held firm over the final moments and allowed the period to end with the score still tied.

The second began much in the way the first ended with both teams looking for their opportunities. About a minute in, Brock Cummings was charging at a loose puck near the Wisconsin cage when Palodichuk hooked him and the Big Green received its second power play of the match. Dartmouth were far better with their second man-advantage and were able to move the puck to Jack Silverberg in the slot but the puck fluttered into Daniel Hauser's belly. Wisconsin got an odd-man rush afterwards but Jack Phelan's shot went wide. Shortly after the penalty was over, Tassy got a open shot off of the rush from the right circle but Croteau's trapper captured the puck. Wisconsin continued to pressure and get looks at the Dartmouth cage but the Big Green defense did not break and several attempts were either blocked or deflected away. Wisconsin hit its second crossbar of the night when a crazy bounce from behind the goal jumped right on Grady Deering's tape but his rushed shot missed an open cage. After a TV timeout, Dartmouth upped their forecheck and were able to get a few good looks on goal. On the ensuing counterattack from the Badgers, Luke Osburn hit the post over Croteau's left shoulder for another near-miss. Moments later, Nathan Morin intercepted a blind pass behind the Wisconsin goal and was almost able to slip a wraparound through Hauser's legs but the score remained unchanged. After a faceoff shortly afterwards, Christian Fitzgerald chipped the puck into the Dartmouth end before being checked by Colin Grable. The referee ruled that the puck had been gone long enough and whistled Grable for an interference penalty. Wisconsin got several chances to score on its power play but they were unable to convert. About halfway through the man-advantage, Hauser nearly turned the puck over behind his own cage but the Badgers were able to retain possession and clear the puck out of their zone. Almost immediately after the penalty expired, a poor change resulted in a too-many men penalty for Wisconsin and Dartmouth got its turn on the power play. Despite keeping the puck in the Wisconsin end for the majority of the time they didn't get a single shot on goal. After killing off the penalty, Wisconsin went on the attack and Tassy got another wide-open chance on goal thanks to a turnover. This time, he tried to slide the puck between Croteau's legs but the Big Green goalie kept his stick on the ice and pushed the puck away. Wisconsin's final chance came as the period was expiring but another block from the Dartmouth defense prevented the puck from getting on goal. By this point the Dartmouth offense was mostly ineffectual with just 8 shots on goal, however, Wisconsin was only able to muster 17 of their own after 40 minutes.

Dartmouth jumped out to a fast start in the third and nearly got an open look at the net but a cross-crease pass went wide. A moment later, Hayden Stavroff broke in on the Wisconsin cage but Aiden Dubinsky was able to wrestle him down. Dubinsky was somehow able to escape without a penalty but the pair did end up crashing into Hauser, causing the goalie to need a moment before continuing. The two sides then exchanged attacks but both had trouble locating the net with their shots. At the 5-minute mark, Tassy got a pass from behind the net and had a clean look at the Dartmouth cage; however, Croteau came out to challenge the deflected the shot over the net. A minute later, a shot in close by Deering was absorbed by Croteau and kept Dartmouth in the game despite the wide disparity in shots. Near the middle of the period, Alex Krause was able to turn the puck over inside the Wisconsin blueline. He was able to get a good bounce off of the end boards to the far side of the net but Dartmouth failed to get a shot on goal. On the ensuing rush up the ice, Zelenov was able to find a wide-open Jack Horbach down low and the senior backhanded the puck under Croteau's blocker for Wisconsin's second lead of the game. With the Big Green now behind, they could no longer sit back and wait for their chances. Dartmouth tried to turn up the pressure but Wisconsin was not accommodating and continued to attack the Badger net. With under six minutes to play, Ryan Botterill threw a puck on goal and the shot was deflected in by Tassy. Wisconsin kept Dartmouth at bay for the next couple of minutes until they iced the puck with about 4 minutes to play. In order to give his team a rest, Mike Hastings called a timeout and Reid Cashman responded by pulling his goaltender. Just 20 seconds later, Fitzgerald was able to beat Stavroff to a loose puck in the Big Green's end and he deposited the puck into the empty net. With nothing to lose, Dartmouth pulled Croteau again and all that did was allow Finley to add another tally to the Badgers' total. The final two minutes passed without much fanfare as both sides understood that the match had already been decided and Wisconsin was able to skate away with the victory.

==== Regional final ====
March 28, 2026; 4:30 pm on ESPN2	(1) Michigan State	3–4 (OT) (0–0, 2–1, 1–2, 0–1)	(3) Wisconsin	DCU Center; Attendance: 3,788

Game reference

Trey Augustine
Goalies
Daniel Hauser
Referees:
Sterling Egan
Nathan Voll
Linesmen:
Bobby Lukkason
Andrew Dokken

	0–1	20:18 – Quinn Finley (17) (Morrissey)
(Martone, Basgall) Gavin O'Connell (6) – PP – 28:10	1–1
(Männistö, Shoudy) Patrick Geary (2) – 28:41	2–1
(Lee, Martone) Matt Basgall (4) – PP – 48:33	3–1
	3–2	55:13 – Luke Osburn (9) (Tulk, Botterill)
	3–3	55:47 – Gavin Morrissey (9) (Fitzgerald, Dexheimer)
	3–4	60:24 – GW – Ben Dexheimer (7) (Morrissey)

6 min
Penalties
6 min
27
Shots
38

Game summary
In the first interconference match of the tournament, the familiar foes had no need for a feeling out period. While trying to record the first goal, both sides played physically both before and after the many whistles in the early portion of the match. While neither side was able to find much rhythm, Wisconsin had the balance of play during the first half of the period. Michigan State began tilting the ice in their favor in the latter half of the period but neither side was able to get a grade-A scoring chance. It wasn't until about 3 minutes to play that Wisconsin was able to get a good shot at a goal off of a turnover, however, Trey Augustine was able to make a glove save on Jack Horbach. MSU got their chance with about a minute to play but Porter Martone's attempt went wide.

Off of an offensive zone faceoff, Quinn Finley slid towards the center before firing a laser off the far post and into the net. MSU tried to set themselves up for an equalizer afterwards but the Wisconsin defense did not give them a decent opportunity. Martone got a bit overeager with trying to lay the body on the Badgers and was called for roughing about three minutes after the goal. Good passing a few miscues from Michigan State allowed the Badgers to get several shots on goal but Augustine stopped all six attempts on the man-advantage. Shortly after killing off the penalty, Horbach was called for high-sticking and MSU had its turn on the power play. Despite possessing one of the strongest special teams in the nation, MSU looked like they were about to wast their first chance when a shot from Gavin O'Connell deflected off of Ben Dexheimer's stick and fluttered over Daniel Hauser, into the net. Moments later, after confirming that #1 center Charlie Stramel had ben ruled out for the remainder of the game, Tommi Männistö found Patrick Geary streaking towards the net with a backhand pass from below the goal line. The defenseman slammed the puck through Hauser for the Spartans' first lead of the game. Wisconsin then went on attack but the Spartans repaid the favor by holding the Badgers to the outside. With about six and a half minutes to play, Ryker Lee was handed an interference penalty to give Wisconsin a second shot with their power play. The red squad was far less competent on their second chance, hardly getting a shot on goal. To make matters worse, found Lee with a pass as he was exiting the box and gave the Spartan forward a breakaway. Houser made the initial save with his left pad but Lee celebrated after he saw the rubber vanish beneath the goalie's leg. The referee initially ruled that the puck did not cross the line but called for the play to be reviewed. After a second look at the play, the officials did not see the puck cross the line and let the play stand as called. With about 2 minutes to play, Michigan State nearly got their third goal when the puck hit Houser's glove and bounced behind the net. The netminder lost sight of the puck and when MSU moved the biscuit back in front for a follow up shot, the attempt hit Houser. As the rubber was rolling towards the net, the goaltender batted it away with his blocker as he was falling to the ice.

The second period began with MSU getting a great chance from the slot but Joe Palodichuk blocked the puck before it could get on goal. Wisconsin began to press but even when they got an offensive zone draw or a turnover, they were unable to turn it into much of a chance. At the 8-minute mark, Martone got a partial break and forced Dexheimer into a hooking call to stop his scoring chance. After seeing a few attempts go wide, Matt Basgall fired a shot from the blueline that sailed through a sea of bodies, off of the post and into the net. After the goal, Michigan State continued to pressure Badger puck carriers up and down the ice, not allowing Wisconsin a good shot on goal. Even when Wisconsin was able to get a puck on goal, Augustine was quick to cover the puck and end any potential rally before it could begin. However, Wisconsin kept shooting and with under 5 minutes to go they finally got a bounce to go their way. After a shot rebounded off the back boards, Oliver Tulk put a shot on goal from in tight. The puck deflected left to the stick of Luke Osburn and he threw it over Augustine's right leg for a goal. Moments later, Wisconsin pressure caused a similar play when Dexheimer found Christian Fitzgerald alone in front with a cross-crease pass. Fitzgerald's shot hit Augustine and bounced to the right and Gavin Morrissey smacked it home to tie the game. With exactly 3 minutes to play, Aiden Dubinsky was called for roughing, however, Wisconsin was saved from having to kill off a penalty due to Daniel Russell receiving an embellishment minor. Wisconsin was almost able to get a high-percentage shot in the waning minutes but two separate passes eluded Badger sticks and time expired before the winning goal could be found.

It took Wisconsin just 24 seconds to earn their trip to the Frozen Four. After the Badgers rimmed the puck in and MSU failed to clear, Dexheimer threw a shot on goal from the point. Tiernan Shoudy attempted to grab the puck out of the air but instead deflected it down into his own cage.

=== Loveland Region ===
==== Regional semifinals ====
March 27, 2026; 2:30 pm on ESPNU	(1) Western Michigan	3–1 (0–0, 2–0, 1–1)	(4) Minnesota State	Blue Arena; Attendance: 4,217

Game reference

Hampton Slukynsky
Goalies
Alex Tracy
Referees:
Jake Rekucki
Nick Bet
Linesmen:
Justin Cornell
Pat Richardson

(Sjolund, Bookman) Zaccharya Wisdom (17) – 22:12	1–0
(Sjolund) Zach Bookman (4) – GW – 28:22	2–0
	2–1	40:47 – Alex Zetterberg (7) (Somoza, Lemyre)
(Wisdom) Owen Michaels (13) – EN – 59:54	3–1

6 min
Penalties
4 min
26
Shots
24

Game summary

March 27, 2026; 6:00 pm on ESPN+	(2) Denver	5–0 (2–0, 1–0, 2–0)	(3) Cornell	Blue Arena; Attendance: 4,217

Game reference

Johnny Hicks
Goalies
Alexis Cournoyer
Referees:
Christopher Leavitt
Brendan Blanchard
Linesmen:
Patrick Philbin
Conner Foley

(Ashcroft, Burrows) Jake Fisher (8) – GW – 6:08	1–0
(Jamieson) Kieran Cebrian (5) – 15:33	2–0
(Caswell) Sam Harris (14) – 35:31	3–0
(Ashcroft, Harris) Clarke Caswell (7) – 45:06	4–0
(Reeder) Rieger Lorenz (16) – EN – 56:12	5–0

2 min
Penalties
4 min
30
Shots
24

Game summary

==== Regional final ====
March 29, 2025; 3:00 pm on ESPN2	(1) Western Michigan	2 – 6 (1–4, 0–0, 1–2)	(2) Denver	Blue Arena; Attendance: 4,470

Hampton Slukynsky
Goalies
Johnny Hicks
Referees:
Jim Curtin
Terrance Murphy
Linesmen:
Nick Briganti
Kevin Briganti

	0–1	02:00 – Sam Harris (15) (Caswell, Epperson)
	0–2	05:24 – Kyle Chyzowski (11) (Pohlkamp)
(Sjölund, Wisdom) Zach Bookman (5) – 06:31	1–2
	1–3	11:48 – Samu Salminen (11) (Reeder)
	1–4	15:13 – Brendan McMorrow (3) (Chyzowski, Cebrian)
(Cowan) Theo Wallberg (2) – 51:14	2–4
	2–5	53:58 – Kieran Cebrian (6) (Chyzowski, McMorrow)
	2–6	58:02 – PP – EN – Eric Pohlkamp (18)

6 min
Penalties
2 min
28
Shots
32

Game summary

=== Frozen Four – Las Vegas, Nevada ===
==== National semifinal ====
April 9, 2026; 5:00 pm on ESPN2	(SF1) North Dakota	1 – 2 (0–2, 0–0, 1–0)	(W3) Wisconsin	T-Mobile Arena; Attendance: 17,942

Jan Špunar
Goalies
Daniel Hauser
Referees:
Cameron Lynch
Jason Williams
Linesmen:
Steve Drain
Adam Wood

	0–1	12:54 – Simon Tassy (14) (Zelenov)
	0–2	13:21 – Ryan Botterill (10) (Dexheimer, Palodichuk)
(James, Strinden) Ellis Rickwood (9) – EA – 59:08	1–2

4 min
Penalties
10 min
22
Shots
37

Game summary

April 9, 2026; 8:30 pm on ESPN2	(A1) Michigan	3–4 (2OT) (2–1, 0–1, 1–1, 0–0, 0–1)	(L2) Denver	T-Mobile Arena; Attendance: 17,942

Game reference

Jack Ivankovic
Goalies
Johnny Hicks
Referees:
Jeremy Tufts
Steven Rouillard
Linesmen:
Shane Kanaly
James McQuesten

	0–1	09:29 – Kyle Chyzowski (12) (McMorrow, Cebrian)
(Draper) Josh Eernisse (11) – 16:18	1–1
	1–2	22:30 – Cale Ashcroft (3) (Harris, Caswell)
(Valentini, Hage) T. J. Hughes (22) – 17:17	2–2
(Horcoff, Spence) Jayden Perron (18) – PP – 31:02	3–2
	3–3	57:14 – Clarke Caswell (8) (Brown, Epperson)
	3–4	92:35 – Kent Anderson (2) (Epperson, Jamieson)

10 min
Penalties
4 min
52
Shots
26

Game summary

==== National Championship ====
April 11, 2026; 5:30 pm on ESPN	(L2) Denver	2 – 1 (0–1, 0–0, 2–0)	(W3) Wisconsin	T-Mobile Arena

Johnny Hicks
Goalies
Daniel Hauser
Referees:
Jim Curtin
Terrance Murphy
Linesmen:
Kevin Briganti
Nick Briganti

	0–1	13:36 – Vasily Zelenov (6) (Knox, Pietila)
(Brown, Epperson) Rieger Lorenz (17) – 47:31	1–1
(Buckberger, Brown) Kyle Chyzowski (13) – 54:08	2–1

2 min
Penalties
4 min
15
Shots
30

== Record by conference ==
Conference	Bids	Record	Win %	Regional Finals	Frozen Four	Championship Game	National Champions
NCHC	4	8–3	.727	4	2	1	1
Big Ten	4	6–4	.600	3	2	1	–
ECAC Hockey	3	1–3	.250	1	–	–	–
Hockey East	3	0–3	.000	–	–	–	–
AHA	1	0–1	.000	–	–	–	–
CCHA	1	0–1	.000	–	–	–	–

== Media ==
=== Television ===
ESPN has the official US television rights to all of the games during the tournament now for the 21st consecutive year. All the games will air on ESPN, ESPN2, ESPNU, or ESPN+.

==== Broadcast assignments ====
Regionals

- Sioux Falls Regional: Jason Ross Jr. and Kevin Weekes – Sioux Falls, South Dakota
- Worcester Regional: Kevin Gehl and Angela Ruggiero – Worcester, Massachusetts
- Albany Regional: Roxy Bernstein and Sean Ritchlin – Albany, New York
- Loveland Regional: John Buccigross and Colby Cohen – Loveland, Colorado

Frozen Four and National Championship Game

- John Buccigross, Colby Cohen, and Quint Kessenich – Las Vegas, Nevada

=== Radio ===
Westwood One has the exclusive radio rights to the Frozen Four and will broadcast both the semifinals and the championship.

- Brian Tripp, Dave Starman (Semifinals)/Pat Micheletti (Championship game), and Shireen Saski

== See also ==
- 2026 NCAA Division I women's ice hockey tournament
- 2026 NCAA Division III men's ice hockey tournament
