= 2026 NCHC Tournament =

2026 NCHC Men's ice hockey tournament
- Dates: March 6–21, 2026
- Teams: 8
- Finals site: Magness Arena; Denver, Colorado
- Champions: Denver (4th title)
- Winning coach: David Carle (2nd title)
- MVP: Johnny Hicks (Denver)
- NCHC Men's Ice Hockey Tournaments

The 2026 NCHC Tournament was the 12th tournament in league history. It was played between March 6 and 21, 2026. All games were played at home sites of the higher-seeded teams.

== Format ==
The first round of the postseason tournament features a best-of-three games format. The top eight conference teams participated in the tournament. Teams were seeded No. 1 through No. 8 according to their final conference standing, with a tiebreaker system used to seed teams with an identical number of points accumulated. The top four seeded teams each earn home ice and host one of the lower seeded teams.

The winners of the first round series advanced to the NCHC Frozen Faceoff. The Frozen Faceoff used a single-elimination format. Teams were re-seeded No. 1 through No. 4 according to the final regular season conference standings.

=== Standings ===
2025–26 National Collegiate Hockey Conference Standings
	Conference record										Overall record					
	GP	W	L	T	OTW	OTL	SW	PTS	GF	GA	GP	W	L	T	GF	GA
#2 North Dakota †	24	17	6	1	1	4	0	55	96	58	37	27	9	1	142	88
#4 Denver *	24	17	6	1	2	1	1	52	82	51	39	25	11	3	137	84
#5 Western Michigan	24	16	7	1	3	1	1	48	89	65	37	26	10	1	135	88
#6 Minnesota Duluth	24	11	12	1	3	4	1	36	64	66	38	23	14	1	124	94
St. Cloud State	24	9	14	1	1	2	1	30	63	86	36	16	19	1	112	112
Colorado College	24	7	11	6	2	3	1	29	63	66	36	13	17	6	95	98
Miami	24	9	13	2	3	1	1	28	60	74	36	18	16	2	104	108
Omaha	24	8	16	0	0	0	0	24	57	86	36	12	24	0	95	129
Arizona State	24	7	16	1	2	1	1	22	62	94	36	14	21	1	106	132
Championship: March 21, 2026 † indicates conference regular season champion (Penrose Cup) * indicates conference tournament champion (National Cup); Rankings: USCHO.com Top 20 Poll; updated March 23, 2026

== Bracket ==
Teams are reseeded for the semifinals.

Quarterfinals; March 6–8
1	North Dakota	5	5	—
8	Omaha	3	1	—
2	Denver	3	6	—
7	Miami	0	2	—
(Teams are reseeded after the quarterfinals)
3	Western Michigan	5	2*	—
6	Colorado College	2	1	—
4	Minnesota Duluth	4*	2*	—
5	St. Cloud State	3	1	—

Semifinals; March 14
4	Minnesota Duluth	5
1	North Dakota	1
3	Western Michigan	1
2	Denver	2*

Championship; March 21
4	Minnesota Duluth	3
2	Denver	4**

Note: * denotes overtime period(s)

== Results ==
Note: All game times are local.

=== Quarterfinals ===
==== (1) North Dakota vs. (8) Omaha ====
March 6, 2026; 7:07 pm	North Dakota	5–3 (1–2, 4–0, 0–1)	Omaha	Ralph Engelstad Arena; Attendance: 11,400

Game reference

Jan Špunar
Goalies
Simon Latkoczy
Referees:
Jake Jackson
Ryan Hersey
Linesmen:
Kyle Stephens
Tyler Landman

(Kernan, Josephson) Cade Littler (5) – PP – 07:26	1–0
	1–1	11:06 – Samuel Huo (7) (McLeary, Wong)
	1–2	12:37 – PP – Maxime Pellerin (9) (Woodworth, Loranger)
(Zmolek, Reschny) Jack Kernan (9) – 21:23	2–2
(Littler, Menghini) Dalton Andrew (1) – 23:10	3–2
(Young, Emery) Ollie Josephson (6) – 25:48	4–2
(Kernan, Josephson) Mac Swanson (9) – PP – 38:23	5–2
	5–3	56:00 – Myles Hilman (6) (Pellerin, de la Gorgendiere)

4 min
Penalties
8 min
28
Shots
20

March 7, 2026; 6:07 pm	North Dakota	5–1 (1–1, 2–0, 2–0)	Omaha	Ralph Engelstad Arena; Attendance: 11,569

Game reference

Jan Špunar
Goalies
Simon Latkoczy
Referees:
Jake Jackson
Ryan Hersey
Linesmen:
Kyle Stephens
Tyler Landman

	0–1	04:19 – Maxime Pellerin (10) (Guevin, Woodworth)
(Reschny, Kernan) Mac Swanson (10) – 14:21	1–1
(Josephson, Wiebe) Tyler Young (5) – 24:42	2–1
(Emery, Rickwood) Will Zellers (18) – 39:32	3–1
(Zellers, Rickwood) Dylan James (18) – EN – 57:12	4–1
(Zellers, Josephson) Mac Swanson (11) – PP – 58:00	5–1

23 min
Penalties
38 min
28
Shots
15

North Dakota wins series 2–0

==== (2) Denver vs. (7) Miami ====
March 6, 2026; 7:00 pm	Denver	3–0 (1–0, 0–0, 2–0)	Miami	Magness Arena; Attendance: 5,974

Game reference

Johnny Hicks
Goalies
Matteo Drobac
Referees:
Brian Hankes
Stephen Reneau
Linesmen:
Erik Contino
Chase McGee

(Ashcroft, Harris) Clarke Caswell (5) – 09:21	1–0
(unassisted) Rieger Lorenz (14) – EN – 58:31	2–0
(unassisted) Eric Jamieson (7) – EN – 58:57	3–0

2 min
Penalties
2 min
36
Shots
23

March 7, 2026; 6:00 pm	Denver	6–2 (0–1, 4–0, 2–1)	Miami	Magness Arena; Attendance: 6,550

Game reference

Johnny Hicks (out 52:31)
Paxton Geisel (in 52:31)
Goalies
Matteo Drobac
Referees:
Brian Hankes
Stephen Reneau
Linesmen:
Erik Contino
Chase McGee

	0–1	01:42 – Ethan Hay (4) (Thompson, Quinn)
(Lorenz) James Reeder (10) – 25:12	1–1
(Buckberger, Chyzowski) Kieran Cebrian (4) – 26:00	2–1
(Milburn, Fisher) – Hagen Burrows (6) – 28:48	3–1
(Varkonyi, Pohlkamp) Kyle Chyzowski (10) – 38:59	4–1
(Harris, Caswell) Eric Pohlkamp (17) – PP – 49:55	5–1
	5–2	55:42 – Doug Grimes (10) (Lukashevich, Hay)
(unassisted) Jake Fisher (7) – 59:17	6–2

8 min
Penalties
6 min
37
Shots
18

Denver wins series 2–0

==== (3) Western Michigan vs. (6) Colorado College ====
March 6, 2026; 7:00 pm	Western Michigan	5–2 (2–0, 1–2, 2–0)	Colorado College	Lawson Arena; Attendance: 2,675

Game reference

Hampton Slukynsky
Goalies
Kaidan Mbereko (out 41:22)
Jackson Unger (in 41:22)
Referees:
Nicholas Krebsbach
Stan Szczurek
Linesmen:
Troy Marrett
Christopher Williams

(Sjolund, Henricks) Grant Slukynsky (9) – PP – 17:31	1–0
(MacKenzie, Cowan) Garrett Szydlowski (4) – 19:39	2–0
	2–1	25:19 – Owen Beckner (8) (Bjorck)
	2–2	27:36 – Seth Constance (3) (Beckner, Koering)
(Henricks, Bookman) William Whitelaw (19) – 35:26	3–2
(Valente, Sjolund) Cole Spicer (3) – PP – 42:13	4–2
(Valente, Woogk) Grant Slukynsky (10) – EN – 58:08	5–2

4 min
Penalties
8 min
38
Shots
28

March 7, 2026; 6:00 pm	Western Michigan	2–1 (OT) (0–1, 0–0, 1–0, 1–0)	Colorado College	Lawson Arena; Attendance: 2,945

Game reference

Hampton Slukynsky
Goalies
Jackson Unger
Referees:
Nicholas Krebsbach
Stan Szczurek
Linesmen:
Troy Marrett
Christopher Williams

	0–1	9:17 – SH – Klavs Veinbergs (11) (Lindberg)
(Whitelaw, Henricks) Owen Michaels (12) – 51:39	1–1
(Slukynsky, Sjolund) Liam Valente (20) – PP – 63:26	2–1

4 min
Penalties
19 min
34
Shots
34

Western Michigan wins series 2–0

==== (4) Minnesota Duluth vs. (5) St. Cloud State ====
March 6, 2026; 7:07 pm	Minnesota Duluth	4–3 (OT) (0–1, 1–1, 2–1, 1–0)	St. Cloud State	AMSOIL Arena; Attendance: 4,238

Game reference

Adam Gajan
Goalies
Yan Shostak
Referees:
Brandon Schmitt
Nathan Wieler
Linesmen:
Dana Penkivech
Sam Rankin

	0–1	6:33 – Austin Burnevik (2) (Roed, Reiners)
	0–2	22:04 – Gavyn Thoreson (11)
(Siepmann, Truman) Kyle Gaffney (3) – 36:02	1–2
(Gaffney, Truman) Adam Kleber (3) – 52:45	2–2
	2–3	54:34 – Nolan Roed (4) (Thoreson, Urness)
(Hanson, Shauabay) Zam Plante – EA – 59:37	3–3
Zam Plante (18) – PP – 63:30	4–3

6 min
Penalties
10 min
39
Shots
24

March 7, 2026; 6:07 pm	Minnesota Duluth	2–1 (OT) (0–1, 0–0, 1–0, 1–0)	St. Cloud State	AMSOIL Arena; Attendance: 4,251

Game reference

Adam Gajan
Goalies
Yan Shostak
Referees:
Brandon Schmitt
Nathan Wieler
Linesmen:
Dana Penkivech
Sam Rankin

	0–1	8:44 – Nolan Roed (5) (Urness, Wylie)
(Hanson, M. Plante) Zam Plante (19) – EA – 59:29	1–1
(Shaugabay, M. Plante) Zam Plante (20) – 65:11	2–1

6 min
Penalties
6 min
45
Shots
28

Minnesota Duluth wins series 2–0

=== Semifinals ===
==== (4) Minnesota Duluth vs. (1) North Dakota ====
March 14, 2026; 6:07 pm	Minnesota Duluth	5–1 (2–0, 1–0, 2–1)	North Dakota	Ralph Engelstad Arena; Attendance: 9,902

Game reference

Adam Gajan
Goalies
Jan Špunar
Referees:
Brian Hankes
Stephen Reneau
Linesmen:
Kyle Stephens
Tyler Landman

(Pierce) Callum Arnott (12) – 2:14	1–0
(Hanson) Max Plante (23) – 7:16	2–0
(Arnott, Bibby) Jayson Shaugabay (11) – 21:26	3–0
	3–1	41:59 – Dylan James (19) (Reschny, Emery)
(Kleber, Plante) Harper Bentz (5) – 48:09	4–1
(Bibby, Bodnarchuk) Kyle Gaffney (4) – 52:49	5–1

6 min
Penalties
2 min
22
Shots
34

==== (3) Western Michigan vs. (2) Denver ====
March 14, 2026; 6:00 pm	Western Michigan	1–2 (OT) (0–0, 0–0, 1–1, 0–1)	Denver	Magness Arena; Attendance: 6,327

Game reference

Hampton Slukynsky
Goalies
Johnny Hicks
Referees:
Brandon Schmitt
Nick Krebsbach
Linesmen:
Erik Contino
Chris Williams

(Cowan, MacKenzie) Garret Szydlowski (5) – 53:19	1–0
	1–1	56:09 – PP, EA – Boston Buckberger (9) (Pohlkamp, Reeder)
	1–2	65:48 – Samu Salminen (10) (Lorenz, Reeder)

4 min
Penalties
4 min
39
Shots
32

=== Championship ===
==== (4) Minnesota Duluth vs. (2) Denver ====
March 21, 2026; 6:00 pm	Minnesota Duluth	3–4 (2OT) (1–3, 2–0, 0–0, 0–0, 0–1)	Denver	Magness Arena; Attendance: 6,506

Game reference

Adam Gajan
Goalies
Johnny Hicks
Referees:
Ryan Hersey
Nathan Wieler
Linesmen:
Tyler Landman
Erik Contino

	0–1	03:33 – Rieger Lorenz (15) (Salminen)
	0–2	06:37 – Clarke Caswell (6) (Ashcroft, McMorrow)
	0–3	13:02 – Boston Buckberger (10) (Brown, Lorenz)
(Plante, Kleber) Max Plante (24) – 18:40	1–3
(Truman, Anderson) Grayden Siepmann (6) – PP – 24:19	2–3
(Gaffney, Truman) Hunter Anderson (6) – PP – 38:05	3–3
	3–4	81:54 – Kristian Epperson (11) (Caswell, Brown)

6 min
Penalties
10 min
44
Shots
33

== Tournament awards ==
=== Frozen Faceoff All-Tournament Team ===
- G: Johnny Hicks * (Denver)
- D: Boston Buckberger (Denver)
- D: Eric Pohlkamp (Denver)
- F: Max Plante (Minnesota Duluth)
- F: Rieger Lorenz (Denver)
- F: Zam Plante (Minnesota Duluth)

* Most Valuable Player(s)
