= 2025–26 NCHC season =

- Season: 2025–26
- Conference: NCHC
- Division: Division I
- Sport: ice hockey
- Duration: October 3, 2025– March 21, 2026
- Number of teams: 9

NHL Entry Draft

Regular season
- Season champions: North Dakota
- Top scorer: Bennett Schimek

NCHC Tournament

NCAA tournament

The 2025–26 NCHC season will be the 13th season of play for the National Collegiate Hockey Conference and took place during the 2025–26 NCAA Division I men's ice hockey season. The season will begin on October 3, 2025, and the conference tournament is set to concluded on March 21, 2026.

== Coaches ==
- After 10 seasons at North Dakota, Brad Berry was fired as head coach. Associate head coach Dane Jackson was promoted first on an interim basis and then as the full-time head coach.

=== Records ===
| Team | Head coach | Season at school | Record at school | NCHC record |
|---|---|---|---|---|
| Arizona State | Greg Powers | 11 (Note: 10th season of NCAA coaching, 16th season overall. Powers was head coach of Arizona State during its last five seasons of club play in the ACHA (2010–2015).) | 153–162–26 (Note: NCAA coaching record only.) | 14–9–1 |
| Colorado College | Kris Mayotte | 5 | 61–77–10 | 37–51–7 |
| Denver | David Carle | 8 | 179–74–17 | 98–57–12 |
| Miami | Anthony Noreen | 2 | 3–28–3 | 0–23–1 |
| Minnesota Duluth | Scott Sandelin | 26 | 469–408–104 | 144–120–25 |
| North Dakota | Dane Jackson | 1 | 0–0–0 | 0–0–0 |
| Omaha | Mike Gabinet | 9 | 135–131–17 | 88–91–13 |
| St. Cloud State | Brett Larson | 8 | 137–97–22 | 84–67–17 |
| Western Michigan | Pat Ferschweiler | 5 | 104–50–4 | 59–35–4 |

== Preseason ==
Members of the media were polled prior to the season and asked to both rank member programs as well as vote for an all-conference team, player of the year and rookie of the year.

=== Preseason Poll ===
| Rank | Team |
|---|---|
| 1 | Western Michigan (19) |
| 2 | Denver (4) |
| 3 | North Dakota (5) |
| 4 | Arizona State (2) |
| 5 | Colorado College |
| 6 | Minnesota Duluth |
| 7 | Omaha |
| 8 | St. Cloud State |
| 9 | Miami |

=== Preseason All-NCHC ===
| First Team | Position |
|---|---|
| Hampton Slukynsky, Western Michigan | G |
| Jake Livanavage, North Dakota | D |
| Eric Pohlkamp, Denver | D |
| Sam Harris, Denver | F |
| Cullen Potter, Arizona State | F |
| Max Plante, Minnesota Duluth | F |

== Standings ==
2025–26 National Collegiate Hockey Conference Standings
| | Conference record | | | | | | | | | | Overall record | | | | | |
| | GP | W | L | T | OTW | OTL | SW | PTS | GF | GA | GP | W | L | T | GF | GA |
|---|---|---|---|---|---|---|---|---|---|---|---|---|---|---|---|---|
| #4 North Dakota † | 24 | 17 | 6 | 1 | 1 | 4 | 0 | 55 | 96 | 58 | 40 | 29 | 10 | 1 | 151 | 90 |
| #1 Denver * | 24 | 17 | 6 | 1 | 2 | 1 | 1 | 52 | 82 | 51 | 43 | 29 | 11 | 3 | 154 | 90 |
| #6 Western Michigan | 24 | 16 | 7 | 1 | 3 | 1 | 1 | 48 | 89 | 65 | 39 | 27 | 11 | 1 | 140 | 95 |
| #7 Minnesota Duluth | 24 | 11 | 12 | 1 | 3 | 4 | 1 | 36 | 64 | 66 | 40 | 24 | 15 | 1 | 130 | 99 |
| St. Cloud State | 24 | 9 | 14 | 1 | 1 | 2 | 1 | 30 | 63 | 86 | 36 | 16 | 19 | 1 | 112 | 112 |
| Colorado College | 24 | 7 | 11 | 6 | 2 | 3 | 1 | 29 | 63 | 66 | 36 | 13 | 17 | 6 | 95 | 98 |
| Miami | 24 | 9 | 13 | 2 | 3 | 1 | 1 | 28 | 60 | 74 | 36 | 18 | 16 | 2 | 104 | 108 |
| Omaha | 24 | 8 | 16 | 0 | 0 | 0 | 0 | 24 | 57 | 86 | 36 | 12 | 24 | 0 | 95 | 129 |
| Arizona State | 24 | 7 | 16 | 1 | 2 | 1 | 1 | 22 | 62 | 94 | 36 | 14 | 21 | 1 | 106 | 132 |
Championship: March 21, 2026 † indicates conference regular season champion (Penrose Cup) * indicates conference tournament champion (National Cup); Rankings: USCHO.com Top 20 Poll; updated April 13, 2026

== Non-conference record ==
=== Regular season record ===
| Team | AHA | Big Ten | CCHA | ECAC Hockey | Hockey East | Independent | Total |
|---|---|---|---|---|---|---|---|
| Arizona State | 1–0–0 | 3–2–0 | 0–2–0 | 1–1–0 | 0–0–0 | 2–0–0 | 7–5–0 |
| Colorado College | 2–0–0 | 0–0–0 | 2–2–0 | 0–0–0 | 2–2–0 | 0–0–0 | 6–4–0 |
| Denver | 1–0–1 | 0–1–0 | 0–0–0 | 0–0–0 | 1–2–1 | 2–2–0 | 4–5–2 |
| Miami | 1–0–0 | 0–0–0 | 3–1–0 | 3–0–0 | 0–0–0 | 2–0–0 | 9–1–0 |
| Minnesota Duluth | 0–0–0 | 2–0–0 | 3–1–0 | 0–0–0 | 0–0–0 | 4–0–0 | 9–1–0 |
| North Dakota | 2–0–0 | 1–1–0 | 4–0–0 | 1–1–0 | 0–0–0 | 0–0–0 | 8–2–0 |
| Omaha | 0–0–0 | 0–0–0 | 2–2–0 | 1–3–0 | 1–1–0 | 0–0–0 | 4–6–0 |
| St. Cloud State | 0–0–0 | 0–0–0 | 2–2–0 | 1–0–0 | 2–1–0 | 2–0–0 | 7–3–0 |
| Western Michigan | 0–0–0 | 4–1–0 | 1–1–0 | 0–0–0 | 3–0–0 | 0–0–0 | 8–2–0 |
| Overall | 7–0–1 | 10–5–0 | 17–11–0 | 7–5–0 | 9–6–1 | 12–2–0 | 62–29–2 |

== Conference Tournament ==
Teams are reseeded for the semifinals.

Quarterfinals; March 6–8
1 | North Dakota | 5 | 5 | —
8 | Omaha | 3 | 1 | —
2 | Denver | 3 | 6 | —
7 | Miami | 0 | 2 | —
(Teams are reseeded after the quarterfinals)
3 | Western Michigan | 5 | 2* | —
6 | Colorado College | 2 | 1 | —
4 | Minnesota Duluth | 4* | 2* | —
5 | St. Cloud State | 3 | 1 | —

Semifinals; March 14
4 | Minnesota Duluth | 5
1 | North Dakota | 1
3 | Western Michigan | 1
2 | Denver | 2*

Championship; March 21
4 | Minnesota Duluth | 3
2 | Denver | 4**

Note: * denotes overtime period(s)

== Ranking ==
=== USCHO ===
| Team | Pre | 1 | 2 | 3 | 4 | 5 | 6 | 7 | 8 | 9 | 10 | 11 | 13 | 14 | 15 | 16 | 17 | 18 | 19 | 20 | 21 | 22 | 23 | 24 | 25 | Final |
|---|---|---|---|---|---|---|---|---|---|---|---|---|---|---|---|---|---|---|---|---|---|---|---|---|---|---|
| Arizona State | 14 | 15 | 15 | NR | NR | NR | NR | NR | NR | NR | NR | NR | NR | NR | NR | NR | NR | NR | NR | NR | NR | NR | NR | NR | NR | – |
| Colorado College | NR | NR | 19 | 16 | 15 | 20 | 17 | NR | NR | 20 | 19 | NR | NR | NR | NR | NR | NR | NR | NR | NR | NR | NR | NR | NR | NR | – |
| Denver | 4 | 5 | 5 | 7 | 6 | 9 | 4 | 3 | 4 | 6 | 6 | 6 | 6 | 7 | 9 | 9 | 11 | 8 | 8 | 8 | 8 | 7 | 6 | 4 | 4 | – |
| Miami | NR | NR | NR | NR | NR | NR | NR | NR | NR | 19 | NR | NR | NR | NR | NR | NR | NR | NR | 20 | 20 | NR | NR | NR | NR | NR | – |
| Minnesota Duluth | NR | NR | NR | 18 | 10 | 7 | 3 | 4 | 5 | 4 | 5 | 5 | 5 | 5 | 6 | 7 | 7 | 10 | 10 | 9 | 9 | 10 | 8 | 6 | 6 | – |
| North Dakota | 11 | 10 | 8 | 8 | 8 | 8 | 6 | 6 | 6 | 5 | 4 | 4 | 4 | 4 | 5 | 4 | 4 | 3 | 3 | 3 | 3 | 3 | 2 | 2 | 2 | – |
| Omaha | NR | NR | NR | NR | NR | NR | NR | NR | NR | NR | NR | NR | NR | NR | NR | NR | NR | NR | NR | NR | NR | NR | NR | NR | NR | – |
| St. Cloud State | NR | NR | NR | NR | NR | NR | NR | NR | NR | NR | NR | NR | NR | NR | NR | NR | 20 | NR | NR | NR | NR | NR | NR | NR | NR | – |
| Western Michigan | 1 | 1 | 2 | 2 | 3 | 4 | 9 | 8 | 7 | 7 | 7 | 7 | 7 | 6 | 3 | 3 | 3 | 4 | 4 | 4 | 4 | 4 | 4 | 5 | 5 | – |

Note: USCHO did not release a poll in week 12 or 26.

=== USA Hockey ===
| Team | Pre | 1 | 2 | 3 | 4 | 5 | 6 | 7 | 8 | 9 | 10 | 11 | 13 | 14 | 15 | 16 | 17 | 18 | 19 | 20 | 21 | 22 | 23 | 24 | 25 | 26 | Final |
|---|---|---|---|---|---|---|---|---|---|---|---|---|---|---|---|---|---|---|---|---|---|---|---|---|---|---|---|
| Arizona State | 14 | 15 | 16 | NR | NR | NR | NR | NR | NR | NR | NR | NR | NR | NR | NR | NR | NR | NR | NR | NR | NR | NR | NR | NR | NR | NR | – |
| Colorado College | NR | NR | 20 | 17 | 16 | 19 | 17 | NR | NR | NR | 19 | NR | NR | NR | NR | NR | NR | NR | NR | NR | NR | NR | NR | NR | NR | NR | – |
| Denver | 4 | 5 | 5 | 7 | 7 | 11 | 4 | 3 | 4 | 5 | 5 | 6 | 6 | 7 | 10 | 9 | 11 | 9 | 8 | 8 | 8 | 7 | 6 | 4 | 4 | 3 | – |
| Miami | NR | NR | NR | NR | NR | 20 | NR | NR | NR | 19 | NR | NR | NR | NR | NR | NR | NR | NR | 20 | NR | NR | NR | NR | NR | NR | NR | – |
| Minnesota Duluth | NR | NR | NR | 19 | 11 | 7 | 3 | 4 | 5 | 4 | 4 | 5 | 5 | 5 | 6 | 6 | 8 | 10 | 9 | 9 | 9 | 10 | 8 | 6 | 6 | 7 | – |
| North Dakota | 10 | 11 | 8 | 8 | 8 | 8 | 6 | 6 | 6 | 6 | 6 | 4 | 4 | 4 | 5 | 4 | 4 | 3 | 3 | 3 | 3 | 2 | 2 | 2 | 2 | 2 | – |
| Omaha | NR | NR | NR | NR | NR | NR | NR | NR | NR | NR | NR | NR | NR | NR | NR | NR | NR | NR | NR | NR | NR | NR | NR | NR | NR | NR | – |
| St. Cloud State | NR | NR | NR | NR | NR | NR | NR | NR | NR | NR | NR | NR | NR | NR | NR | NR | 19 | NR | NR | NR | NR | NR | NR | NR | NR | NR | – |
| Western Michigan | 1 | 1 | 2 | 2 | 3 | 4 | 8 | 7 | 7 | 7 | 8 | 8 | 7 | 6 | 4 | 3 | 3 | 4 | 4 | 4 | 4 | 4 | 4 | 5 | 5 | 6 | – |

Note: USA Hockey did not release a poll in week 12.

=== NPI ===
| Team | 1 | 2 | 3 | 4 | 5 | 6 | 7 | 8 | 9 | 10 | 11 | 13 | 14 | 15 | 16 | 17 | 18 | 19 | 20 | 21 | 22 | 23 | 24 | Final |
|---|---|---|---|---|---|---|---|---|---|---|---|---|---|---|---|---|---|---|---|---|---|---|---|---|
| Arizona State | – | – | 34 | – | – | 44 | 40 | 43 | 41 | 39 | 35 | 25 | 24 | 23 | 28 | 29 | 34 | 37 | 39 | 42 | 41 | 41 | 40 | – |
| Colorado College | – | – | 16 | – | – | 28 | 31 | 36 | 34 | 32 | 32 | 34 | 37 | 35 | 35 | 30 | 32 | 31 | 32 | 27 | 32 | 31 | 31 | – |
| Denver | – | – | 20 | – | – | 7 | 3 | 5 | 5 | 6 | 6 | 9 | 11 | 10 | 13 | 11 | 11 | 8 | 9 | 8 | 6 | 5 | 4 | – |
| Miami | – | – | 4 | – | – | 12 | 24 | 29 | 17 | 21 | 26 | 30 | 32 | 24 | 25 | 19 | 21 | 21 | 26 | 26 | 33 | 33 | 32 | – |
| Minnesota Duluth | – | – | 7 | – | – | 4 | 5 | 6 | 4 | 4 | 7 | 4 | 4 | 4 | 6 | 8 | 10 | 9 | 7 | 10 | 8 | 6 | 6 | – |
| North Dakota | – | – | 14 | – | – | 5 | 10 | 10 | 7 | 5 | 4 | 2 | 2 | 3 | 3 | 3 | 3 | 3 | 3 | 3 | 2 | 2 | 2 | – |
| Omaha | – | – | 3 | – | – | 22 | 20 | 33 | 31 | 31 | 38 | 42 | 40 | 45 | 43 | 40 | 39 | 43 | 41 | 41 | 42 | 42 | 42 | – |
| St. Cloud State | – | – | 29 | – | – | 31 | 25 | 17 | 14 | 24 | 24 | 20 | 19 | 17 | 17 | 25 | 20 | 22 | 23 | 25 | 29 | 30 | 27 | – |
| Western Michigan | – | – | 15 | – | – | 26 | 18 | 12 | 11 | 11 | 12 | 7 | 5 | 5 | 5 | 4 | 4 | 4 | 4 | 4 | 4 | 4 | 5 | – |

Note: teams ranked in the top-10 automatically qualify for the NCAA tournament. Teams ranked 11-16 can qualify based upon conference tournament results.
