= 2025–26 Minnesota Duluth Bulldogs men's ice hockey season =

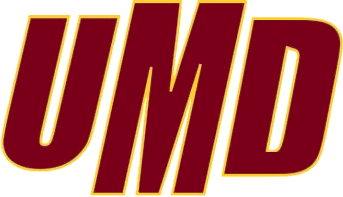

NCAA Tournament, W 3-1 VS. Penn State L 3-4 VS. Michigan
- Conference: NCHC
- Home ice: AMSOIL Arena

Rankings
- USCHO: #6
- USA Hockey: #6

Record
- Overall: 24–15–1
- Conference: 11–12–1
- Home: 11–7–1
- Road: 12–7–0
- Neutral: 1–1–0

Coaches and captains
- Head coach: Scott Sandelin
- Assistant coaches: Adam Krause; Cody Chupp; Brant Nicklin

The 2025–26 Minnesota Duluth Bulldogs men's ice hockey season is the 82nd season of play for the program and 13th in the NCHC. The Bulldogs represent the University of Minnesota Duluth in the 2025–26 NCAA Division I men's ice hockey season, play their home games at AMSOIL Arena and are coached by Scott Sandelin in his 26th season.

== Season ==
The season started against Alaska-Fairbanks. The Bulldogs, coming off of a 13-20-3 season, did not have the highest of expectations heading into the year. And while things started well, sweeping Alaska-Fairbanks and Bemidji State, as well as being ranked #18 in the country heading into their matchup against in-state rival Minnesota, things were not expected to go well, as many saw UMD's 5-1-0 start as the result of an easy schedule. That would change however, as UMD shut down Minnesota and took both games against them in convincing fashion, 3-0 and 4-1 respectively, helping them leapfrog to #10 in the rankings. They then managed to split with North Dakota on the road, before taking both games back at home against another in-state rival in St. Cloud State. The Bulldogs white-hot streak of games would simmer down as the season went on, as they split their next 4 series, those being at home against Omaha, on the road against Colorado College, on the road against #7Western Michigan, and at home against Arizona State. And while they would win their next three matches(an exhibition win against Manitoba and a sweep of Lindenwood, all at home), they got cold once again, splitting against St. Cloud State on the road, before being swept by both #3 Western Michigan at home and #11 Denver on the road. After the Denver series, sophomore goaltender Adam Gajan would be replaced by backup Goaltender Ethan Dahlmeir. Once Dahlmeir took over, UMD split with North Dakota. They would sweep Miami(OH) on the road before a home split with Colorado College. They would finish the regular season with a 20-13-1 record, going 11-12-1 in-conference. Despite the sub-.500 conference record, UMD secured the 4 spot in the conference and got the 4 seed as a result, which meant they hosted St. Cloud State. Adam Gajan came back in to replace Dahlmier to start the playoffs. They would end up sweeping the Huskies in two dramatic games, as Max Plante was able to bury both game-winning goals to push UMD over St. Cloud State. The next week was a road match between #8 UMD and #2 North Dakota. Despite the #2 ranking and being on the road, the Bulldogs came in and utterly trounced the Fighting Hawks, leaving with a 5–1 victory and a NCHC Championship birth against #4 Denver. Denver proved to be too much, as while UMD and Denver went the extra mile, needing two overtimes to decide it, it was Denver who ultimately won it, 4–3. Despite the crushing loss, UMD's season wasn't over, as their play throughout the season was good enough to earn both an NCAA playoff berth and a #2 seed in the Albany Region. Their first game was against Penn State, and while it would be close, UMD was able to pull away late and get a 3–1 victory, putting them 1 win away from the Frozen Four. However, the season would ultimately end at the hands of the #1 ranked Michigan Wolverines, as while the Bulldogs would take a 3-goal deficit and turn it into a 1-goal game, they ultimately ran out of time and lost 3–4. The Bulldogs finished the season going 24–15–1, with hope for more next season.

== Departures ==
Player	Position	Nationality	Cause
Luke Bast	Defenseman	Canada	Graduation (retired)
Kyle Bettens	Forward	Canada	Transferred to Northern Michigan
Aiden Dubinsky	Defenseman	United States	Transferred to Wisconsin
Will Francis	Defenseman	United States	Graduation (signed with Anaheim Ducks)
Owen Gallatin	Defenseman	United States	Graduation (signed with Fort Wayne Komets)
Dominic James	Forward	United States	Graduation (retired)
Klayton Knapp	Goaltender	United States	Transferred to Lindenwood
Carter Loney	Forward	United States	Graduation (retired)
Anthony Menghini	Forward	United States	Transferred to North Dakota
Joey Molenaar	Forward	United States	Graduation (retired)
Matthew Perkins	Forward	Canada	Transferred to Northeastern
Zach Sandy	Goaltender	United States	Transferred to North Dakota
Jack Smith	Forward	United States	Transferred to Minnesota State

== Recruiting ==
Player	Position	Nationality	Age	Notes
Hunter Anderson	Forward	United States	20	Manhattan Beach, CA
Luke Bibby	Forward	Canada	20	Brantford, ON
Brady Cleveland	Defenseman	United States	20	Wausau, WI; transfer from Colorado College; selected 47th overall in 2023
Ethan Dahlmeir	Goaltender	United States	22	Lakeville, MN; transfer from Miami
Kyle Gaffney	Forward	United States	24	Plymouth, MN; transfer from Alaska
Kyler Kovich	Forward	Canada	23	Coquitlam, BC; graduate transfer from Cornell
Cole Sheffield	Goaltender	Canada	21	London, ON
Daniel Shlaine	Forward	United States	19	Moscow, RUS
Grayden Siepmann	Defenseman	Canada	21	Windsor, ON
Jake Toll	Defenseman	United States	20	Rosemount, MN
Scout Truman	Forward	Canada	22	Lethbridge, AB; graduate transfer from Massachusetts Lowell
Ryan Zaremba	Forward	Canada	19	Balgonie, SK

== Roster ==
As of August 12, 2025.

No.	Nat.	Player	Class	Pos	Height	Weight	DoB	Hometown	Previous team	NHL rights
2	(United States)	Ty Hanson	Sophomore	D	5' 9" (1.75 m)	170 lb (77 kg)	2005-04-21	Hermantown, Minnesota	Sioux City Musketeers (USHL)	—
3	(United States)	Jake Toll	Freshman	D	6' 3" (1.91 m)	170 lb (77 kg)	2004-10-30	Rosemount, Minnesota	Muskegon Lumberjacks (USHL)	—
5	(United States)	Brady Cleveland	Junior	D	6' 5" (1.96 m)	211 lb (96 kg)	2005-04-01	Wausau, Wisconsin	Colorado College (NCHC)	DET, 47th overall 2023
6	(United States)	Adam Kleber	Sophomore	D	6' 6" (1.98 m)	214 lb (97 kg)	2006-03-24	Chaska, Minnesota	Lincoln Stars (USHL)	BUF, 42nd overall 2024
8	(United States)	Aaron Pionk	Junior	D	6' 0" (1.83 m)	175 lb (79 kg)	2003-01-16	Hermantown, Minnesota	Waterloo Black Hawks (USHL)	MIN, 149th overall 2023
10	(United States)	Max Plante	Sophomore	F	5' 11" (1.8 m)	176 lb (80 kg)	2006-02-20	Hermantown, Minnesota	USNTDP (USHL)	DET, 47th overall 2024
11	(United States)	Hunter Anderson	Freshman	F	5' 10" (1.78 m)	185 lb (84 kg)	2005-04-28	Manhattan Beach, California	Lincoln Stars (USHL)	—
13	(United States)	Daniel Shlaine	Freshman	F	6' 0" (1.83 m)	185 lb (84 kg)	2005-10-30	Moscow, Russia	Lincoln Stars (USHL)	—
16	(United States)	Blake Bechen	Sophomore	F	6' 0" (1.83 m)	187 lb (85 kg)	2005-01-25	Dubuque, Iowa	Green Bay Gamblers (USHL)	—
17	(United States)	Jayson Shaugabay	Sophomore	F	5' 9" (1.75 m)	165 lb (75 kg)	2005-04-05	Warroad, Minnesota	Green Bay Gamblers (USHL)	TBL, 115th overall 2023
18	(United States)	Joey Pierce	Senior	D	6' 0" (1.83 m)	208 lb (94 kg)	2002-10-02	Hermantown, Minnesota	Lincoln Stars (USHL)	—
19	(United States)	Harper Bentz	Sophomore	F	6' 0" (1.83 m)	176 lb (80 kg)	2004-11-29	Moorhead, Minnesota	Fargo Force (USHL)	—
20	(Canada)	Riley Bodnarchuk	Senior	D	6' 4" (1.93 m)	205 lb (93 kg)	2001-06-01	Okotoks, Alberta	Okotoks Oilers (AJHL)	—
21	(Canada)	Braden Fischer	Junior	F	6' 1" (1.85 m)	185 lb (84 kg)	2002-10-02	Winnipeg, Manitoba	Minot Minotauros (NAHL)	—
22	(Canada)	Ryan Zaremba	Freshman	F	5' 9" (1.75 m)	179 lb (81 kg)	2006-03-30	Balgonie, Saskatchewan	Fargo Force (USHL)	—
23	(United States)	Kyle Gaffney	Senior	F	6' 0" (1.83 m)	180 lb (82 kg)	2001-09-05	Plymouth, Michigan	Alaska (NCAA)	—
24	(Canada)	Scout Truman	Senior	F	5' 10" (1.78 m)	185 lb (84 kg)	2002-10-15	Lethbridge, Alberta	Massachusetts Lowell (HEA)	—
25	(Canada)	Callum Arnott	Sophomore	F	6' 1" (1.85 m)	170 lb (77 kg)	2004-01-12	King City, Ontario	Penticton Vees (BCHL)	—
27	(United States)	Zam Plante	Sophomore	F	5' 11" (1.8 m)	176 lb (80 kg)	2004-08-24	Hermantown, Minnesota	Fargo Force (USHL)	PIT, 150th overall 2022
28	(Canada)	Luke Bibby	Freshman	F	6' 0" (1.83 m)	170 lb (77 kg)	2004-10-29	Brantford, Ontario	Brooks Bandits (BCHL)	—
30	(Slovakia)	Adam Gajan	Sophomore	G	6' 3" (1.91 m)	187 lb (85 kg)	2004-05-06	Poprad, Slovakia	Green Bay Gamblers (USHL)	CHI, 35th overall 2023
35	(United States)	Ethan Dahlmeir	Sophomore	G	6' 4" (1.93 m)	216 lb (98 kg)	2003-09-07	Lakeville, Minnesota	Miami (NCHC)	—
36	(Canada)	Cole Sheffield	Freshman	G	6' 0" (1.83 m)	176 lb (80 kg)	2004-05-08	London, Ontario	Dauphin Kings (MJHL)	—
37	(Canada)	Grayden Siepmann	Freshman	D	5' 11" (1.8 m)	181 lb (82 kg)	2004-05-26	Windsor, Ontario	Saskatoon Blades (WHL)	—
38	(Canada)	Kyler Kovich	Graduate	F	6' 2" (1.88 m)	182 lb (83 kg)	2002-01-31	Coquitlam, British Columbia	Cornell (ECAC)	—
39	(United States)	Trevor Stachowiak	Sophomore	F	6' 2" (1.88 m)	196 lb (89 kg)	2003-02-25	Dallas, Texas	Minot Minotauros (NAHL)	—

== Standings ==
2025–26 National Collegiate Hockey Conference Standings
	Conference record										Overall record					
	GP	W	L	T	OTW	OTL	SW	PTS	GF	GA	GP	W	L	T	GF	GA
#4 North Dakota †	24	17	6	1	1	4	0	55	96	58	40	29	10	1	151	90
#1 Denver *	24	17	6	1	2	1	1	52	82	51	43	29	11	3	154	90
#6 Western Michigan	24	16	7	1	3	1	1	48	89	65	39	27	11	1	140	95
#7 Minnesota Duluth	24	11	12	1	3	4	1	36	64	66	40	24	15	1	130	99
St. Cloud State	24	9	14	1	1	2	1	30	63	86	36	16	19	1	112	112
Colorado College	24	7	11	6	2	3	1	29	63	66	36	13	17	6	95	98
Miami	24	9	13	2	3	1	1	28	60	74	36	18	16	2	104	108
Omaha	24	8	16	0	0	0	0	24	57	86	36	12	24	0	95	129
Arizona State	24	7	16	1	2	1	1	22	62	94	36	14	21	1	106	132
Championship: March 21, 2026 † indicates conference regular season champion (Penrose Cup) * indicates conference tournament champion (National Cup); Rankings: USCHO.com Top 20 Poll; updated April 13, 2026

== Schedule and results ==
Date	Time	Opponent^{#}	Rank^{#}	Site	TV	Decision	Result	Attendance	Record
Regular season
October 3	10:07 pm	at Alaska*		Carlson Center • Fairbanks, Alaska	FloHockey	Gajan	W 5–1	2,220	1–0–0
October 4	10:07 pm	at Alaska*		Carlson Center • Fairbanks, Alaska	FloHockey	Gajan	W 4–1	2,700	2–0–0
October 10	7:07 pm	Augustana*		AMSOIL Arena • Duluth, Minnesota	My9	Gajan	W 4–1	5,541	3–0–0
October 11	6:07 pm	Augustana*		AMSOIL Arena • Duluth, Minnesota	My9	Gajan	L 0–4	5,658	3–1–0
October 17	7:07 pm	at Bemidji State*		Sanford Center • Bemidji, Minnesota	Midco Sports+, My9	Gajan	W 7–3	2,694	4–1–0
October 18	6:07 pm	Bemidji State*		AMSOIL Arena • Duluth, Minnesota	My9	Gajan	W 5–1	5,232	5–1–0
October 24	7:00 pm	at #12 Minnesota*	#18	Mariucci Arena • Minneapolis, Minnesota (Rivalry)	My9	Gajan	W 3–0	9,630	6–1–0
October 25	7:00 pm	at #12 Minnesota*	#18	Mariucci Arena • Minneapolis, Minnesota (Rivalry)	My9	Gajan	W 4–1	9,694	7–1–0
October 31	7:07 pm	at #8 North Dakota	#10	Ralph Engelstad Arena • Grand Forks, North Dakota	Midco, My9	Gajan	W 4–3 ^{OT}	11,023	8–1–0 (1–0–0)
November 1	6:07 pm	at #8 North Dakota	#10	Ralph Engelstad Arena • Grand Forks, North Dakota	Midco, My9	Gajan	L 1–5	11,495	8–2–0 (1–1–0)
November 7	7:07 pm	St. Cloud State	#7	AMSOIL Arena • Duluth, Minnesota	My9	Gajan	W 4–0	5,385	9–2–0 (2–1–0)
November 8	6:07 pm	St. Cloud State	#7	AMSOIL Arena • Duluth, Minnesota	My9	Gajan	W 3–2 ^{OT}	5,589	10–2–0 (3–1–0)
November 14	7:07 pm	Omaha	#3	AMSOIL Arena • Duluth, Minnesota	My9	Gajan	W 5–2	5,239	11–2–0 (4–1–0)
November 15	6:07 pm	Omaha	#3	AMSOIL Arena • Duluth, Minnesota	My9	Gajan	L 0–2	5,349	11–3–0 (4–2–0)
November 21	8:00 pm	at Colorado College	#4	Ed Robson Arena • Colorado Springs, Colorado	SOCO CW	Gajan	W 4–2	3,457	12–3–0 (5–2–0)
November 22	7:00 pm	at Colorado College	#4	Ed Robson Arena • Colorado Springs, Colorado		Gajan	L 1–2 ^{OT}	3,417	12–4–0 (5–3–0)
December 5	7:00 pm	at #7 Western Michigan	#4	Lawson Arena • Kalamazoo, Michigan		Gajan	W 4–1	3,178	13–4–0 (6–3–0)
December 6	6:00 pm	at #7 Western Michigan	#4	Lawson Arena • Kalamazoo, Michigan		Gajan	L 2–3 ^{OT}	2,978	13–5–0 (6–4–0)
December 12	7:07 pm	Arizona State	#5	AMSOIL Arena • Duluth, Minnesota	My9	Gajan	W 3–1	5,583	14–5–0 (7–4–0)
December 13	5:07 pm	Arizona State	#5	AMSOIL Arena • Duluth, Minnesota	My9	Gajan	L 3–6	5,749	14–6–0 (7–5–0)
January 2	7:07 pm	Manitoba*	#5	AMSOIL Arena • Duluth, Minnesota (Exhibition)	My9	Dahlmeir	W 4–0	5,173	
January 9	7:07 pm	Lindenwood*	#5	AMSOIL Arena • Duluth, Minnesota	My9	Gajan	W 6–3	4,257	15–6–0
January 10	6:07 pm	Lindenwood*	#5	AMSOIL Arena • Duluth, Minnesota	My9	Dahlmeir	W 8–4	4,198	16–6–0
January 16	7:00 pm	at St. Cloud State	#6	Herb Brooks National Hockey Center • St. Cloud, Minnesota	My9, The CW	Gajan	L 0–6	3,598	16–7–0 (7–6–0)
January 17	6:00 pm	at St. Cloud State	#6	Herb Brooks National Hockey Center • St. Cloud, Minnesota	My9, The CW	Dahlmeir	W 5–3	4,566	17–7–0 (8–6–0)
January 23	7:07 pm	#3 Western Michigan	#7	AMSOIL Arena • Duluth, Minnesota	My9	Gajan	L 3–4	5,798	17–8–0 (8–7–0)
January 24	6:07 pm	#3 Western Michigan	#7	AMSOIL Arena • Duluth, Minnesota	My9	Gajan	L 3–4 ^{OT}	5,801	17–9–0 (8–8–0)
January 30	8:00 pm	at #11 Denver	#7	Magness Arena • Denver, Colorado		Gajan	L 3–4	6,320	17–10–0 (8–9–0)
January 31	7:00 pm	at #11 Denver	#7	Magness Arena • Denver, Colorado		Gajan	L 0–1 ^{OT}	6,356	17–11–0 (8–10–0)
February 6	7:07 pm	#3 North Dakota	#10	AMSOIL Arena • Duluth, Minnesota	My9	Dahlmeir	W 3–2 ^{OT}	6,668	18–11–0 (9–10–0)
February 7	6:07 pm	#3 North Dakota	#10	AMSOIL Arena • Duluth, Minnesota	My9	Dahlmeir	L 1–4	6,869	18–12–0 (9–11–0)
February 20	6:05 pm	at #20 Miami	#9	Steve Cady Arena • Oxford, Ohio	RESN	Dahlmeir	W 5–2	2,307	19–12–0 (10–11–0)
February 21	5:05 pm	at #20 Miami	#9	Steve Cady Arena • Oxford, Ohio	RESN	Dahlmeir	W 4–1	3,372	20–12–0 (11–11–0)
February 27	7:07 pm	Colorado College	#9	Amsoil Arena • Duluth, Minnesota	My9, SOCO CW	Dahlmeir	L 1–4	5,437	20–13–0 (11–12–0)
February 28	6:07 pm	Colorado College	#9	Amsoil Arena • Duluth, Minnesota	My9	Dahlmeir	T 2–2 ^{SOW}	5,437	20–13–1 (11–12–1)
NCHC Tournament
March 6	7:07 pm	St. Cloud State*	#10	AMSOIL Arena • Duluth, Minnesota (NCHC Quarterfinal Game 1)	My9	Gajan	W 4–3 ^{OT}	4,238	21–13–1
March 7	6:07 pm	St. Cloud State*	#10	AMSOIL Arena • Duluth, Minnesota (NCHC Quarterfinal Game 2)	My9	Gajan	W 2–1 ^{OT}	4,251	22–13–1
March 14	6:07 pm	at #2 North Dakota*	#8	AMSOIL Arena • Duluth, Minnesota (NCHC Semifinal)	Midco Sports	Gajan	W 5–1	9,902	23–13–1
March 21	7:00 pm	at #4 Denver*	#6	Magness Arena • Denver, Colorado (NCHC Championship)		Gajan	L 3–4 ^{2OT}	6,506	23–14–1
NCAA Tournament
March 27	8:00 pm	vs. #10 Penn State*	#6	MVP Arena • Albany, New York (Regional Semifinal)	ESPN2	Gajan	W 3–1	5,237	24–14–1
March 29	5:00 pm	vs. #1 Michigan*	#6	MVP Arena • Albany, New York (Regional Final)	ESPN	Gajan	L 3-4	5,750	24-15-1
*Non-conference game. ^{#}Rankings from USCHO.com Poll. All times are in Central Time. Source:

== Rankings ==
Poll	Week																											
Poll	Pre	1	2	3	4	5	6	7	8	9	10	11	12	13	14	15	16	17	18	19	20	21	22	23	24	25	26	27 (Final)
USCHO.com	RV	RV	RV	18	10	7	3	4	5	4	5	5	–	5	5	6	7	7	10	10	9	9	10	8	6	6		
USA Hockey	RV	RV	RV	19	11	7	3	4	5	4	4	5	–	5	5	6	6	8	10	9	9	9	10	8	6	6		

Note: USCHO did not release a poll in week 12.
Note: USA Hockey did not release a poll in week 12.
