= 2025–26 Western Michigan Broncos men's ice hockey season =

Holiday Face–Off, Champion NCAA Tournament, Regional Final
- Conference: NCHC
- Home ice: Lawson Arena

Rankings
- USCHO: #5
- USA Hockey: #5

Record
- Overall: 27–11–1
- Conference: 16–7–1
- Home: 11–6–0
- Road: 13–4–1
- Neutral: 3–1–0

Coaches and captains
- Head coach: Pat Ferschweiler
- Assistant coaches: Jason Herter; J. J. Crew; Jared Brown

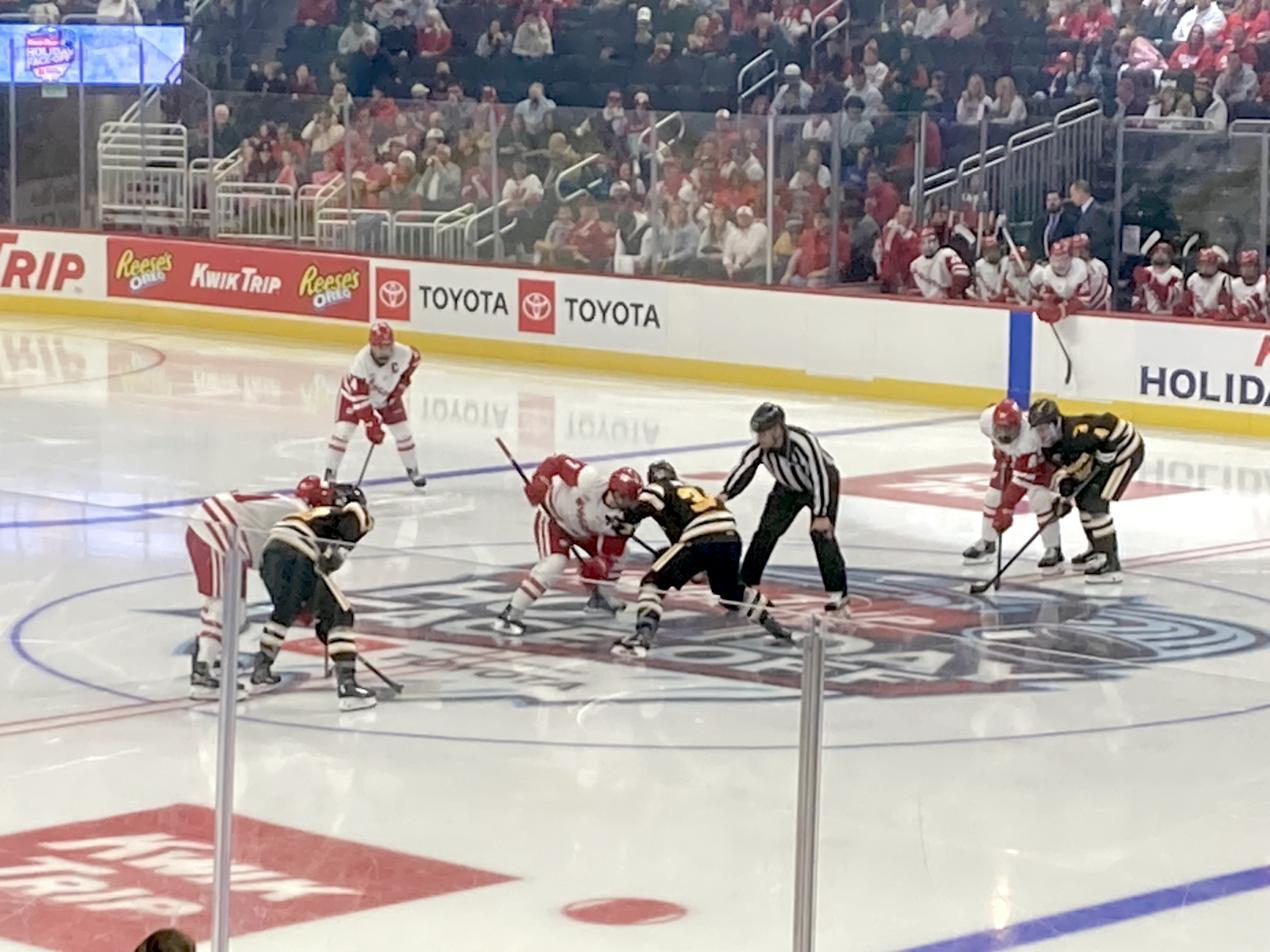
Western Michigan playing Wisconsin during the Holiday Face–Off in Milwaukee

The 2025–26 Western Michigan Broncos men's ice hockey season was the 52nd season of play for the program and 13th in the NCHC. The Broncos represented Western Michigan University in the 2025–26 NCAA Division I men's ice hockey season, played their home games at the Lawson Arena and were coached by Pat Ferschweiler in his fifth season.

== Departures ==
Player	Position	Nationality	Cause
Connor Brown	Forward	United States	Left program
Alex Bump	Forward	United States	Signed professional contract (Philadelphia Flyers)
Matteo Costantini	Forward	Canada	Graduation (signed with Rochester Americans)
Robby Drazner	Defenseman	United States	Graduation (retired)
Cam Knuble	Forward	United States	Graduation (retired)
Brian Kramer	Defenseman	United States	Graduation (signed with SaiPa)
Tristan Lemyre	Forward	Canada	Transferred to Minnesota State
Jack Mesic	Defenseman	United States	Transferred to Ferris State
Cameron Rowe	Goaltender	United States	Graduation (signed with Rockford IceHogs)
Wyatt Schingoethe	Forward	United States	Graduation (retired)
Ean Somoza	Forward	United States	Transferred to Minnesota State
Tim Washe	Forward	United States	Graduation (signed with Anaheim Ducks)
Ethan Wolthers	Forward	United States	Transferred to Sacred Heart

== Recruiting ==
Player	Position	Nationality	Age	Notes
Zach Bookman	Defenseman	United States	23	Syracuse, NY; transfer from Merrimack
Alex Calbeck	Defenseman	United States	19	St. Charles, IL
Bobby Cowan	Forward	United States	19	Edina, MN
Sam Huck	Forward	Canada	21	Calgary, AB
Tyler MacKenzie	Forward	Canada	21	Red Deer, AB
Gavin Moffatt	Goaltender	United States	21	Darien, CT
Jamison Sluys	Forward	United States	20	Point Roberts, WA
Cole Spicer	Forward	United States	21	Grand Forks, ND; selected 117th overall in 2022
Theo Wallberg	Defenseman	Sweden	21	Stockholm, SWE; transfer from Ohio State; selected 168th overall in 2022
William Whitelaw	Forward	United States	20	Rosemount, MN; transfer from Michigan; selected 66th overall in 2023
Zaccharya Wisdom	Forward	Canada	21	Toronto, ON; transfer from Colorado College; selected 212th overall in 2023
Colby Woogk	Defenseman	United States	21	Fort Worth, TX

== Roster ==
As of March 25, 2026.

No.	Nat.	Player	Class	Pos	Height	Weight	DoB	Hometown	Previous team	NHL rights
1	(United States)	Kirk Laursen	Graduate	G	6' 3" (1.91 m)	185 lb (84 kg)	2000-01-02	Bloomfield Hills, Michigan	Miami (NCHC)	—
2	(United States)	Grady Gallatin	Sophomore	D	6' 3" (1.91 m)	179 lb (81 kg)	2004-06-07	White Bear Lake, Minnesota	Janesville Jets (NAHL)	—
3	(United States)	Cole Crusberg-Roseen	Junior	D	5' 11" (1.8 m)	184 lb (83 kg)	2002-04-14	Stratham, New Hampshire	Lincoln Stars (USHL)	—
4	(Canada)	Zaccharya Wisdom	Junior	F	6' 0" (1.83 m)	175 lb (79 kg)	2004-04-21	Toronto, Ontario	Colorado College (NCHC)	SEA, 212th overall 2023
6	(Sweden)	Theo Wallberg	Junior	D	6' 5" (1.96 m)	203 lb (92 kg)	2003-12-04	Stockholm, Sweden	Ohio State (Big Ten)	OTT, 168th overall 2022
8	(United States)	Zach Nehring	Sophomore	F	6' 3" (1.91 m)	179 lb (81 kg)	2005-03-07	Minot, North Dakota	Sioux Falls Stampede (USHL)	WPG, 82nd overall 2023
9	(United States)	Zach Bade	Sophomore	F	6' 2" (1.88 m)	183 lb (83 kg)	2003-04-26	Rosemount, Minnesota	Tri-City Storm (USHL)	—
10	(United States)	Zack Sharp	Sophomore	D	6' 1" (1.85 m)	181 lb (82 kg)	2005-03-29	Naperville, Illinois	Cedar Rapids RoughRiders (USHL)	SJS, 124th overall 2025
11	(Canada)	Tyler MacKenzie	Freshman	F	5' 10" (1.78 m)	185 lb (84 kg)	2004-06-06	Red Deer, Alberta	Everett Silvertips (WHL)	—
12	(Canada)	Sam Huck	Freshman	F	5' 9" (1.75 m)	150 lb (68 kg)	2004-08-31	Calgary, Alberta	Waterloo Black Hawks (USHL)	—
13	(United States)	Grant Slukynsky	Junior	F	6' 1" (1.85 m)	205 lb (93 kg)	2002-03-12	Edina, Minnesota	Northern Michigan (CCHA)	—
14	(United States)	Colby Woogk	Freshman	D	6' 1" (1.85 m)	203 lb (92 kg)	2004-07-10	Fort Worth, Texas	Tri-City Storm (USHL)	—
15	(United States)	Alex Calbeck	Freshman	D	6' 1" (1.85 m)	185 lb (84 kg)	2006-06-20	St. Charles, Illinois	Chicago Steel (USHL)	—
17	(United States)	Ty Henricks	Sophomore	F	6' 4" (1.93 m)	216 lb (98 kg)	2005-06-28	Mission Viejo, California	Muskegon Lumberjacks (USHL)	NYR, 183rd overall 2023
18	(United States)	William Whitelaw	Junior	F	5' 9" (1.75 m)	175 lb (79 kg)	2005-02-05	Rosemount, Minnesota	Michigan (Big Ten)	CBJ, 66th overall 2023
19	(United States)	Bobby Cowan	Freshman	F	5' 11" (1.8 m)	181 lb (82 kg)	2006-06-12	Edina, Minnesota	Madison Capitols (USHL)	—
21	(United States)	Ryan Kusler	Sophomore	F	6' 0" (1.83 m)	187 lb (85 kg)	2003-05-19	Battle Creek, Michigan	Omaha Lancers (USHL)	—
22	(Finland)	Iiro Hakkarainen	Sophomore	F	5' 11" (1.8 m)	172 lb (78 kg)	2004-03-09	Helsinki, Finland	Fargo Force (USHL)	—
23	(Sweden)	Liam Valente	Senior	F	5' 11" (1.8 m)	183 lb (83 kg)	2003-05-23	Märsta, Sweden	Providence (HEA)	—
24	(United States)	Garrett Szydlowski	Junior	F	5' 10" (1.78 m)	185 lb (84 kg)	2002-06-12	Detroit, Michigan	Wenatchee Wild (BCHL)	—
25	(United States)	Cole Spicer	Junior	F	5' 11" (1.8 m)	185 lb (84 kg)	2004-06-13	Grand Forks, North Dakota	Dubuque Fighting Saints (USHL)	BOS, 117th overall 2022
26	(United States)	Jamison Sluys	Freshman	F	5' 10" (1.78 m)	194 lb (88 kg)	2005-09-03	Point Roberts, Washington	Youngstown Phantoms (USHL)	—
27	(Finland)	Joona Väisänen	Sophomore	D	6' 0" (1.83 m)	176 lb (80 kg)	2004-07-29	Espoo, Finland	Dubuque Fighting Saints (USHL)	PIT, 175th overall 2024
28	(United States)	Ryan Humphrey	Sophomore	F	5' 11" (1.8 m)	165 lb (75 kg)	2003-04-08	Northville, Michigan	Green Bay Gamblers (USHL)	—
30	(United States)	Hampton Slukynsky	Sophomore	G	6' 1" (1.85 m)	190 lb (86 kg)	2005-07-02	Warroad, Minnesota	Fargo Force (USHL)	LAK, 118th overall 2023
33	(Sweden)	Samuel Sjölund	Senior	D	6' 1" (1.85 m)	175 lb (79 kg)	2001-05-19	Stockholm, Sweden	Dubuque Fighting Saints (USHL)	DAL, 111th overall 2019
34	(United States)	Owen Michaels	Junior	F	6' 0" (1.83 m)	185 lb (84 kg)	2002-05-01	Detroit, Michigan	Dubuque Fighting Saints (USHL)	—
35	(United States)	Gavin Moffatt	Freshman	G	6' 0" (1.83 m)	183 lb (83 kg)	2004-04-16	Darien, Connecticut	Green Bay Gamblers (USHL)	—
37	(United States)	Zach Bookman	Senior	D	5' 10" (1.78 m)	175 lb (79 kg)	2002-03-29	Syracuse, New York	Merrimack (HEA)	—

== Standings ==
2025–26 National Collegiate Hockey Conference Standings
	Conference record										Overall record					
	GP	W	L	T	OTW	OTL	SW	PTS	GF	GA	GP	W	L	T	GF	GA
#4 North Dakota †	24	17	6	1	1	4	0	55	96	58	40	29	10	1	151	90
#1 Denver *	24	17	6	1	2	1	1	52	82	51	43	29	11	3	154	90
#6 Western Michigan	24	16	7	1	3	1	1	48	89	65	39	27	11	1	140	95
#7 Minnesota Duluth	24	11	12	1	3	4	1	36	64	66	40	24	15	1	130	99
St. Cloud State	24	9	14	1	1	2	1	30	63	86	36	16	19	1	112	112
Colorado College	24	7	11	6	2	3	1	29	63	66	36	13	17	6	95	98
Miami	24	9	13	2	3	1	1	28	60	74	36	18	16	2	104	108
Omaha	24	8	16	0	0	0	0	24	57	86	36	12	24	0	95	129
Arizona State	24	7	16	1	2	1	1	22	62	94	36	14	21	1	106	132
Championship: March 21, 2026 † indicates conference regular season champion (Penrose Cup) * indicates conference tournament champion (National Cup); Rankings: USCHO.com Top 20 Poll; updated April 13, 2026

== Schedule and results ==
Date	Time	Opponent^{#}	Rank^{#}	Site	TV	Decision	Result	Attendance	Record
Exhibition
October 4	6:00 pm	USNTDP*	#1	Lawson Arena • Kalamazoo, Michigan (Exhibition)	NCHC.tv	Slukynsky	W 7–0		
Regular season
October 9	7:07 pm	Ferris State*	#1	Lawson Arena • Kalamazoo, Michigan	NCHC.tv	Slukynsky	L 2–3	4,178	0–1–0
October 10	7:07 pm	at Ferris State*	#1	Ewigleben Arena • Big Rapids, Michigan	Midco Sports+	Slukynsky	W 6–4	1,943	1–1–0
October 17	7:15 pm	at Massachusetts Lowell*	#2	Tsongas Center • Lowell, Massachusetts	ESPN+	Slukynsky	W 2–1	5,095	2–1–0
October 18	6:00 pm	at Massachusetts Lowell*	#2	Tsongas Center • Lowell, Massachusetts	ESPN+	Slukynsky	W 6–0	5,294	3–1–0
October 23	7:00 pm	at #3 Michigan*	#2	Yost Ice Arena • Ann Arbor, Michigan	BTN	Slukynsky	L 0–4	5,800	3–2–0
October 24	7:00 pm	#3 Michigan*	#2	Lawson Arena • Kalamazoo, Michigan	NCHC.tv	Slukynsky	W 5–2	4,441	4–2–0
October 31	8:00 pm	at St. Cloud State	#3	Herb Brooks National Hockey Center • St. Cloud, Minnesota	The CW	Slukynsky	W 6–5	3,068	5–2–0 (1–0–0)
November 1	7:00 pm	at St. Cloud State	#3	Herb Brooks National Hockey Center • St. Cloud, Minnesota	The CW	Slukynsky	L 1–5	3,489	5–3–0 (1–1–0)
November 7	7:00 pm	#9 Denver	#4	Lawson Arena • Kalamazoo, Michigan	NCHC.tv	Slukynsky	L 1–3	3,670	5–4–0 (1–2–0)
November 8	6:00 pm	#9 Denver	#4	Lawson Arena • Kalamazoo, Michigan	NCHC.tv	Slukynsky	L 3–6	3,825	5–5–0 (1–3–0)
November 14	7:00 pm	Miami	#9	Lawson Arena • Kalamazoo, Michigan		Slukynsky	W 5–2	3,271	6–5–0 (2–3–0)
November 15	6:00 pm	Miami	#9	Lawson Arena • Kalamazoo, Michigan		Slukynsky	W 6–2	3,763	7–5–0 (3–3–0)
November 21	8:00 pm	at Omaha	#8	Baxter Arena • Omaha, Nebraska		Slukynsky	W 7–2	6,237	8–5–0 (4–3–0)
November 22	8:00 pm	at Omaha	#8	Baxter Arena • Omaha, Nebraska		Slukynsky	W 4–2	6,076	9–5–0 (5–3–0)
December 5	7:00 pm	#4 Minnesota Duluth	#7	Lawson Arena • Kalamazoo, Michigan	My9	Slukynsky	L 1–4	3,178	9–6–0 (5–4–0)
December 6	6:00 pm	#4 Minnesota Duluth	#7	Lawson Arena • Kalamazoo, Michigan	My9	Slukynsky	W 3–2 ^{OT}	2,978	10–6–0 (6–4–0)
Holiday Face–Off
December 28	5:00 pm	vs. #12 Boston College*	#7	Fiserv Forum • Milwaukee, Wisconsin (Holiday Face–Off Semifinal)	B1G+	Slukynsky	W 5–2	8,277	11–6–0
December 29	8:30 pm	vs. #2 Wisconsin*	#7	Fiserv Forum • Milwaukee, Wisconsin (Holiday Face–Off Championship)	B1G+	Slukynsky	W 4–1	7,002	12–6–0
Regular season
January 2	7:00 pm	at Notre Dame*	#7	Compton Family Ice Arena • Notre Dame, Indiana	Peacock	Slukynsky	W 4–0	5,166	13–6–0
January 3	6:00 pm	Notre Dame*	#7	Lawson Arena • Kalamazoo, Michigan		Slukynsky	W 4–0	4,047	14–6–0
January 9	9:00 pm	at #7 Denver	#6	Magness Arena • Denver, Colorado		Slukynsky	W 4–1	6,591	15–6–0 (7–4–0)
January 10	8:00 pm	at #7 Denver	#6	Magness Arena • Denver, Colorado		Slukynsky	W 6–2	6,385	16–6–0 (8–4–0)
January 23	8:00 pm	at #7 Minnesota Duluth	#3	AMSOIL Arena • Duluth, Minnesota		Slukynsky	W 4–3	5,798	17–6–0 (9–4–0)
January 24	7:00 pm	at #7 Minnesota Duluth	#3	AMSOIL Arena • Duluth, Minnesota		Slukynsky	W 4–3 ^{OT}	5,801	18–6–0 (10–4–0)
January 30	7:00 pm	Omaha	#3	Lawson Arena • Kalamazoo, Michigan		Slukynsky	W 5–2	3,633	19–6–0 (11–4–0)
January 31	6:00 pm	Omaha	#3	Lawson Arena • Kalamazoo, Michigan		Slukynsky	L 1–4	3,946	19–7–0 (11–5–0)
February 6	7:00 pm	at Miami	#4	Steve Cady Arena • Oxford, Ohio	RESN	Slukynsky	L 2–3 ^{OT}	3,642	19–8–0 (11–6–0)
February 7	6:00 pm	at Miami	#4	Steve Cady Arena • Oxford, Ohio	RESN	Slukynsky	W 3–1	3,453	20–8–0 (12–6–0)
February 13	7:00 pm	Arizona State	#4	Lawson Arena • Kalamazoo, Michigan		Slukynsky	W 6–2	3,325	21–8–0 (13–6–0)
February 14	6:00 pm	Arizona State	#4	Lawson Arena • Kalamazoo, Michigan		Slukynsky	W 7–2	3,358	22–8–0 (14–6–0)
February 20	9:00 pm	at Colorado College	#4	Ed Robson Arena • Colorado Springs, Colorado	SOCO CW	Slukynsky	T 1–1 ^{SOW}	3,532	22–8–1 (14–6–1)
February 21	8:00 pm	at Colorado College	#4	Ed Robson Arena • Colorado Springs, Colorado		Slukynsky	W 2–0	3,532	23–8–1 (15–6–1)
February 27	7:00 pm	#3 North Dakota	#4	Lawson Arena • Kalamazoo, Michigan		Slukynsky	L 3–5	4,103	23–9–1 (15–7–1)
February 28	6:00 pm	#3 North Dakota	#4	Lawson Arena • Kalamazoo, Michigan		Slukynsky	W 4–3 ^{OT}	4,351	24–9–1 (16–7–1)
NCHC Tournament
March 6	7:00 pm	Colorado College*	#4	Lawson Arena • Kalamazoo, Michigan (NCHC Quarterfinal Game 1)		Slukynsky	W 5–2	2,675	25–9–1
March 7	6:00 pm	Colorado College*	#4	Lawson Arena • Kalamazoo, Michigan (NCHC Quarterfinal Game 2)		Slukynsky	W 2–1	2,945	26–9–1
March 14	8:00 pm	at #6 Denver*	#4	Magness Arena • Denver, Colorado (NCHC Semifinal)		Slukynsky	L 1–2 ^{OT}	6,327	26–10–1
NCAA Tournament
March 27	2:30 pm	vs. #14 Minnesota State*	#5	Blue Arena • Loveland, Colorado (Regional Semifinal)	ESPNU	Slukynsky	W 3–1		27–10–1
March 29	3:00 pm	vs. #4 Denver*	#5	Blue Arena • Loveland, Colorado (Regional Final)	ESPN2	Slukynsky	L 2–6		27–11–1
*Non-conference game. ^{#}Rankings from USCHO.com Poll. All times are in Eastern Time. Source:

== Rankings ==
Ranking movements Legend: ██ Increase in ranking ██ Decrease in ranking ( ) = First-place votes
	Week																											
Poll	Pre	1	2	3	4	5	6	7	8	9	10	11	12	13	14	15	16	17	18	19	20	21	22	23	24	25	26	Final
USCHO.com	1 (29)	1 (32)	2 (6)	2 (9)	3 (1)	4	9	8	7	7	7	7	*	7	6 (1)	3 (1)	3 (1)	3 (1)	4	4	4	4	4	4 (1)	5	5		
USA Hockey	1 (22)	1 (24)	2 (4)	2 (5)	3	4	8	7	7	7	8	8	*	7	6	4	3	3	4	4	4	4	4	4	5	5		

Note: USCHO did not release a poll in week 12.
Note: USA Hockey did not release a poll in week 12.
