= David Carle =

American ice hockey coach

Current position
- Title: Head coach
- Team: Denver
- Conference: NCHC

Biographical details
- Born: November 9, 1989 (age 36); Anchorage, Alaska, U.S.
- Education: University of Denver

Playing career
- Position: Defenseman

Coaching career (HC unless noted)
- 2008–2012: Denver (assistant)
- 2012–2014: Green Bay Gamblers (assistant)
- 2014–2018: Denver (assistant)
- 2018–present: Denver

Head coaching record
- Overall: 179–74–17 (.694)
- Tournaments: 12–3 (.800)

Accomplishments and honors

Championships
- 2021–22 NCHC Champion; 2022 NCAA National Champion; 2022–23 NCHC Champion; 2024 NCHC Tournament Champion; 2024 NCAA National Champion; 2026 NCHC Tournament Champion; 2026 NCAA National Champion
Medal record
IIHF World Junior Championships
Head coach for the United States
Gold medal – first place	2024 Sweden
Gold medal – first place	2025 Canada

David Carle (born November 9, 1989) is an American ice hockey coach who is the head coach for the men's ice hockey team at the University of Denver.

== Career ==
Hailing from Anchorage, Alaska, Carle attended prep school at Shattuck-Saint Mary's in Faribault, Minnesota. After his career at Shattuck, Carle was projected to be a second-round pick in the 2008 NHL entry draft. While preparing for the draft an abnormality was detected during the NHL combine and after undergoing tests at the Mayo Clinic Carle was diagnosed with hypertrophic cardiomyopathy, an enlargement of a heart muscle. While the genetic abnormality is not immediately life-threatening, it has been shown to be a leading cause of sudden death in athletes. The diagnosis caused Carle to retire from ice hockey as a player, but despite the end of his career he was still drafted 203rd overall in the seventh and final round by the Tampa Bay Lightning. Then-owner Oren Koules's son attended Shattuck-Saint Mary's at the same time as Carle; Koules directed general manager Jay Feaster to select Carle in recognition of Carle's hard work.

The University of Denver honored the scholarship it had offered to Carle and he began attending the school in the fall of 2008. Wanting to keep him as part of the team, head coach George Gwozdecky offered Carle a place as an assistant coach with the program as long as he was a student at Denver. What started out as a tentative effort to see if Carle was still interested in the game eventually turned into a full-time coaching position. After graduating from Denver in 2012, Carle joined the Green Bay Gamblers of the United States Hockey League (USHL) as an assistant coach, but returned to Denver less than two years later as an assistant under then-new head coach Jim Montgomery. Carle stayed with the Pioneers for four years, helping the team win the 2017 national championship, before he replaced Montgomery as head coach in 2018.

In the 2018–19 season, Carle led Denver to the 2019 Frozen Four in his first season as head coach.

In 2021–22 season, he led the team into the 2022 Frozen Four as a first seed (fourth overall), where they defeated Minnesota State 5–1.

In 2022–23 season, Carle led Denver to a 30-win season, and the Penrose Cup as National Collegiate Hockey Conference (NCHC) regular season champions. He was also selected to coach the U.S. national junior team at the 2024 World Junior Championship in Sweden. He led the U.S. to its sixth World Junior Championship gold medal, where they defeated Sweden 6–2.

In 2023–24 season, he led Denver to its record-breaking 10th national championship in the 2024 Frozen Four as a first seed (third overall), where they defeated Boston College 2–0. He was again selected to coach the U.S. national junior team at the 2025 World Junior Championship in Ottawa, Ontario, Canada, where he led the U.S. to its seventh World Junior Championship gold. The U.S. defeated Finland 4–3 in overtime to win back-to-back World Junior Championships for the first time in the country's history.

In the 2025-26 season, he led Denver to a national championship win in the 2026 Frozen Four. This marked the program's 11th men's ice hockey championship.

== Personal life ==
Carle has two brothers who also played ice hockey. Older brother Matt played for Denver, winning two national titles and a Hobey Baker Award, before embarking on an 11-year career in the National Hockey League (NHL). His younger brother Alex played for Merrimack College.

== Head coaching record ==
Record table
Season	Team	Overall	Conference	Standing	Postseason
Denver Pioneers (NCHC) (2018–present)
2018–19	Denver	24–12–5	11–10–3	4th	NCAA Frozen Four
2019–20	Denver	21–9–6	11–9–5–4	3rd	Tournament Cancelled
2020–21	Denver	10–13–1	9–12–1	5th	NCHC Semifinal
2021–22	Denver	31–9–1	18–6–0	1st	NCAA National Champion
2022–23	Denver	30–10–0	19–5–0	1st	NCAA Regional Semifinal
2023–24	Denver	32–9–3	15–7–2	2nd	NCAA National Champion
2024–25	Denver	31–12–1	15–8–1	3rd	NCAA Frozen Four
2025–26	Denver	29–11–3	17–6–1	2nd	NCAA National Champion
Denver:		208–85–20 (.696)	115–63–13 (.636)		
Total:		208–85–20 (.696)			
National champion Postseason invitational champion Conference regular season champion Conference regular season and conference tournament champion Division regular season champion Division regular season and conference tournament champion Conference tournament champion
