= Johnny Hicks =

Canadian ice hockey player (born 2005)

- Born: September 11, 2005 (age 20) Kamloops, British Columbia, Canada
- Height: 5 ft 10 in (178 cm)
- Weight: 157 lb (71 kg; 11 st 3 lb)
- Position: Goaltender
- Catches: Left
- NCAA team: University of Denver

Johnathan Hicks (born September 11, 2005) is a Canadian college ice hockey goaltender for the University of Denver of the National Collegiate Athletic Association (NCAA). He was named the Most Outstanding Player at the 2026 NCAA Division I men's ice hockey tournament.

== Playing career ==
=== Junior ===
Hicks spent two seasons with the Merritt Centennials of the British Columbia Hockey League (BCHL) from 2021 to 2023. He was named the Most Valuable Player for Merritt during the 2021–22 season, and named Rookie of the Year. He then joined the Brooks Bandits of the Alberta Junior Hockey League (AJHL) for the 2023–24 season. During his first year with the Bandits he appeared in 30 games and posted a 26–3–0 record, with a 1.98 goals against average (GAA), .909 save percentage and seven shutouts. He began the 2024–25 season with the Bandits and posted an 18–3–0 record, with a 1.37 GAA and .943 save percentage in 21 games. He led the BCHL in goals against average and save percentage and was named to the 2024–25 BCHL All Star Team. On January 3, 2025, he signed with the Victoria Royals of the Western Hockey League (WHL). In 14 regular season games with the Royals, he posted a 10–4–1 record, with 2.69 GAA, and .909 save percentage.

=== College ===
On April 27, 2025, Hicks committed to play college ice hockey at Denver. During the 2025–26 season, in his freshman year, he appeared in 21 games and posted a 16–0–1 record. He began the season as the backup goaltender to Quentin Miller, before Miller suffered a season-ending injury. After being named the starting goaltender, he was undefeated in regulation, and led the nation with a 1.19 GAA, and .957 save percentage.

During the national semifinals at the 2026 NCAA Division I men's ice hockey tournament, Hicks made a career-high 49 saves, including stopping 42 of 43 shots over the final 67:25 of the game, to lead Denver to a 4–3 double-overtime win against Michigan. During the championship game, he made 29 saves against Wisconsin, to help Denver win their record 11th NCAA tournament championship, and third title in five years. Following his outstanding performance, he was named to the NCAA All-Tournament team and tournament Most Outstanding Player.

== Awards and honors ==
Award	Year
College
NCAA All-Tournament Team	2026
NCAA Tournament MVP	2026

Awards and achievements
Preceded by Owen Michaels	NCAA Tournament Most Outstanding Player; 2026	Succeeded by Incumbent
