= Tyler Muszelik =

American ice hockey player (born 2004)

- Born: July 1, 2004 (age 22) Long Valley, New Jersey, U.S.
- Height: 6 ft 3 in (191 cm)
- Weight: 195 lb (88 kg; 13 st 13 lb)
- Position: Goaltender
- Catches: Left
- NHL team (P) Cur. team: Florida Panthers; Savannah Ghost Pirates (ECHL)
- NHL draft: 189th overall, 2022; Florida Panthers
- Playing career: 2026–present

Tyler Christian Muszelik (born July 1, 2004) is an American professional ice hockey goaltender for the Savannah Ghost Pirates of the ECHL while under contract to the Florida Panthers of the National Hockey League (NHL). He was selected 189th overall in the 2022 NHL Entry Draft.

Raised in the Long Valley section of Washington Township, Morris County, New Jersey, Muszelik played prep hockey at West Morris Central High School, shifting to goaltender as his high school career progressed.

== Playing career ==
Muszelik was selected 189th overall by the Florida Panthers in the 2022 NHL Draft.

Following his time with the NTDP, Muszelik committed to the University of New Hampshire, where he played two seasons with the Wildcats. Injuries limited portions of his collegiate career, but he gained valuable experience in Hockey East competition before transferring to the University of Connecticut for the 2024–25 season.

At UConn, Muszelik quickly established himself as the Huskies' starting goaltender. During the 2024–25 season, he posted a 12–6–3 record with a .914 save percentage and a 2.29 goals-against average, helping the program compete near the top of Hockey East. He was named the Connecticut Ice Tournament Most Valuable Player and earned All-Tournament Team honors.

In his senior season (2025–26), Muszelik enjoyed a breakout year, recording a 19–11–5 record with a .926 save percentage and a 2.21 goals-against average. His performance helped lead UConn to consecutive NCAA Tournament appearances, and he was named to the Mike Richter Award Watch List, presented annually to the top NCAA Division I men's goaltender.

Muszelik signed his two-year, entry-level contract with the Panthers on March 30, 2026, beginning in the 2026–27 season.

== Career statistics ==
			Regular season									Playoffs
Season	Team	League	GP	W	L	OTL	MIN	GA	SO	GAA	SV%	GP	W	L	MIN	GA	SO	GAA	SV%
2020–21	U.S. National Development Team	USHL	18	5	10	2	1007	82	0	4.88	.857	—	—	—	—	—	—	—	—
2021–22	U.S. National Development Team	USHL	16	10	3	2	870	46	1	3.17	.900	—	—	—	—	—	—	—	—
2022–23	Univ. of New Hampshire	HE	13	4	7	2	685	37	1	3.24	.883	—	—	—	—	—	—	—	—
2023–24	Univ. of New Hampshire	HE	8	5	3	0	479	27	1	3.38	.874	—	—	—	—	—	—	—	—
2024–25	Univ. of Connecticut	HE	23	12	6	3	1313	50	1	2.28	.912	—	—	—	—	—	—	—	—
2025–26	Univ. of Connecticut	HE	35	19	11	5	2094	77	0	2.21	.926	—	—	—	—	—	—	—	—
NCAA totals			78	40	27	10	4,571	191	3	2.51	.911	—	—	—	—	—	—	—	—
