= Rieger Lorenz =

Canadian hockey player (born 2004)

- Born: March 30, 2004 (age 22) Calgary, Alberta, Canada
- Height: 6 ft 1 in (185 cm)
- Weight: 184 lb (83 kg; 13 st 2 lb)
- Position: Left wing
- Shoots: Left
- NHL team: Minnesota Wild
- NHL draft: 56th overall, 2022; Minnesota Wild

Rieger Lorenz (born March 30, 2004) is a Canadian professional ice hockey left wing for the Minnesota Wild of the National Hockey League (NHL).
