= Lawson Arena =

Sports arena in Kalamazoo, Michigan, USA

Lawson Ice Arena
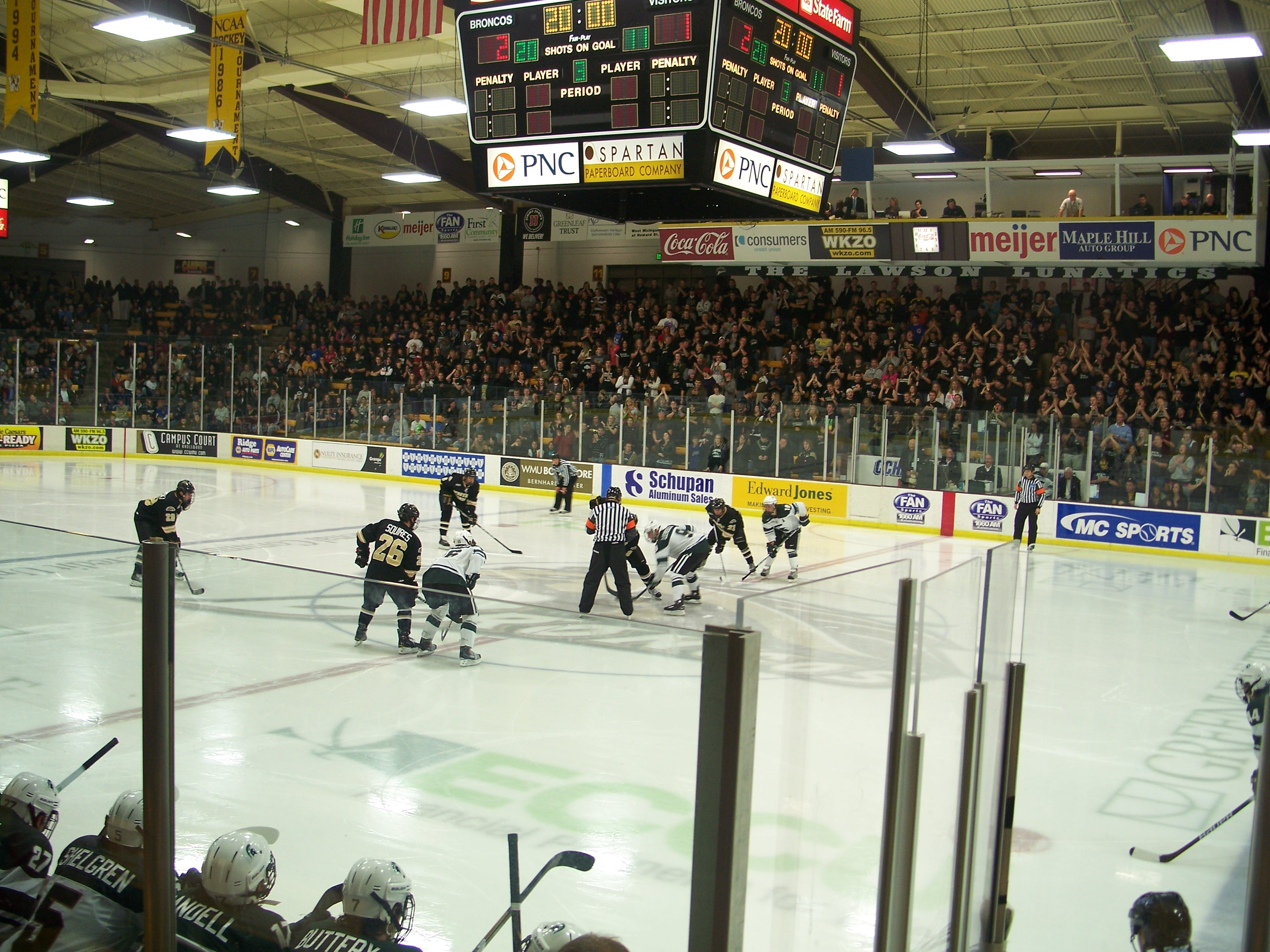
- Arena during a 2010 game
- Interactive map of Lawson Ice Arena
- Full name: Harry W. Lawson Ice Arena and Gabel Natatorium
- Location: 2009 Howard Street, Kalamazoo, MI 49006
- Coordinates: 42.275937°N 85.617765°W
- Owner: Western Michigan University
- Operator: Matt Kulik
- Capacity: 3,667
- Surface: Ice
- Scoreboard: 4-Sided Box Center Ice & 3 Separate LED Screens
- Record attendance: 5,168 (October 31, 1987)
- Field size: 200' x 85' (Ice Hockey)
- Public transit: WMU Bronco Transit Bus Service

Construction
- Opened: November 15, 1974
- Renovated: 1993, 1997, 1998, 2006, 2013, 2016

Tenants
- WMU Ice Hockey (NCAA) (1974–present); WMU Men's Basketball (NCAA) (1992–1994); WMU Women's Basketball (NCAA) (1992–1994); WMU Synchronized Skating (1999–2004)

Website
- wmubroncos.com/facilities/lawson-arena/6

Harry W. Lawson Ice Arena and Gabel Natatorium is a 3,667-seat multi-purpose arena, and adjacent natatorium in Kalamazoo, Michigan, located on the far Southwest corner of Western Michigan University's main campus. The arena is a single-level, horseshoe-style arena with a concourse at the top. It is home to the Western Michigan Broncos men's ice hockey team, the WMU men's ice hockey club team, and the WMU synchronized skating club team. The arena is named after Harry W. Lawson, the founder of the hockey program at Western Michigan University. Now closed, the Gabel Natatorium contained an olympic size swimming pool, diving facility, and was home to the WMU Swimming and Diving Club team.

From 1992 to 1994, while University Arena was being renovated, the basketball teams also called Lawson home.

== History ==
With men's ice hockey slated to become a varsity sport at Western in 1973, the university needed to provide a suitable arena for the team. Prior to the arena and varsity status, the team would play their club games at an outdoor ice rink in Kalamazoo near the Crosstown Parkway. On November 15, 1974, Lawson Ice Arena opened its doors for the first time as the Broncos faced off against the Thunderbirds of Algoma University. The arena was named after Harry W. Lawson, a professor at Western Michigan who organized and founded the club hockey team in 1956, which eventually became the school's varsity team.

The arena's record attendance was set on October 31, 1987, when a standing-room crowd of 5,168 watched the Broncos take on then-CCHA rival, Michigan State.

With the men's hockey team flourishing in the 1980s and early 1990s, the university began with a series of renovations. The first was a $1 million series of upgrades during summer 1993, when a new floor, boards and glass, and cooling system were installed in the arena. This was followed by a $250,000 renovation in 1997, when chair-back seating was added on the south side of the arena, club-style seating on the southwest corner of the arena above the ice resurfacer tunnel, and vinyl bleachers were installed. In 1998, the arena received a new $1 million metal roof, to replace the old, wooden roof. The next upgrade in 2006 was priced at $2.2 million, when both locker rooms were renovated, athletic training rooms were upgraded, and coach's quarters were added along with a film/meeting room. With the resurgence of the program around 2010, the next upgrade was in 2013 with a new scoreboard at center ice along with three video boards placed around the arena. The upgrades were financed by an anonymous donor, who gave the university $1 million for video board upgrades in Lawson and University Arenas.

In summer 2014, a city water main break flooded the basement with 6–8 feet of water, shutting down the arena for a couple weeks while repairs were made. Light damage was reported to the natatorium filtration system, along with the ice cooling system. Safety systems prevented further damage from occurring.

During the summer of 2016, Lawson again saw major renovations. The 25-year-old ice making system was replaced, new boards and glass were brought in, and the ventilation system was given an overhaul. The renovations allowed the arena to become LEEDS (Leadership in Energy and Environmental Design) certified.

As of December 2017, Lawson Ice Arena is the oldest arena in the National Collegiate Hockey Conference, and the third smallest in capacity next to the Goggin Ice Center (3,200) in Oxford, Ohio and the Ed Robson Arena (3,407) in Colorado Springs, Colorado.

=== New arena ===
In 2013, with rumors of a new ice arena swirling, Western Michigan athletic director Kathy Beauregard stated that Lawson will be the home of the Bronco's hockey team for the foreseeable future. She did not deny that renderings and feasibility studies were conducted, due to Lawson's age, and lack of fan amenities.

In January 2024, Bill Johnston of the wealth management firm Greenleaf Trust announced that a new event center in downtown Kalamazoo was scheduled to break ground by the end of the year. As of September 2024, the 426,000-square-foot arena is projected to cost $300 million. The complex will feature an ice sheet, two basketball courts, a community space, two parking decks, and a multi-use event hall. It will play host to Western Michigan's hockey, men's basketball, and women's basketball teams, the Kalamazoo Wings of the ECHL, and other non-sporting events such as concerts.

== Tenants ==
=== Men's ice hockey ===
The men's hockey team has called Lawson home since its opening in 1974, and most of the facility upgrades have revolved around the hockey team. Almost all of the team's athletic and team training facilities are located within the arena. The arena is noted as one of the toughest to play within the NCHC, mainly due to the old-style design, and the Lawson Lunatics.

==== Lawson Lunatics ====
The official student section for the hockey team is known as the Lawson Lunatics. The whole east side of the arena is reserved for the student section, which normally brings 1,400 students to each game. The students were ranked as the No. 1 student section in college hockey, and were asked by the university in 2013 to tone down the chants due to numerous complaints. The students are one of the main reasons that many current and former players in the NCAA consider Lawson one of the toughest arenas to play in.

=== Men's and women's basketball ===
From 1992 to 1994, the Broncos' men's and women's basketball teams moved to Lawson while the University Arena was reconfigured and renovated. The teams also played at arenas in Grand Rapids and Kalamazoo.

=== Synchronized skating ===
The WMU synchronized skating team called Lawson home from 1999 to 2004. In 2004, the team's varsity status was revoked due to financial issues. As a result of the loss of varsity status, the team claimed club status, but still calls Lawson home.

=== Other events ===
Besides hockey, skating, and basketball, Lawson has hosted other events such as ice shows, professional boxing matches, and concerts. The arena also hosts travel and high school hockey games, and is used by the university for club and intramural hockey as well.

== Gabel Natatorium ==
Within the complex and adjacent to the Lawson Ice Arena was the Gabel Natatorium, which contained an olympic sized swimming pool and diving tank. Home to the WMU club swimming and diving teams, the West Michigan Diving Academy, regional high school swim and dive teams (Hackett Catholic Prep High School, Mattawan High School, the natatorium was also used for lap swim, open swim, WMU for-credit courses offered by the Department of Health, Physical Education & Recreation, scuba lessons, learn-to-swim, engineering challenges, and pool party rental. The Western Michigan Broncos football team utilized the pool for recovery workouts, rehabilitation, and outreach events. In 2016, the complex underwent a strategic LEED-certified renovation that enabled heat generated from the ice-making process to be captured and utilized for energy and cost-efficient heating of the pool.. The university closed the pool March 2020 during the COVID pandemic, then officially shuttered the natatorium due to budget concerns a few months later.
