= Max Plante =

American ice hockey player (born 2006)

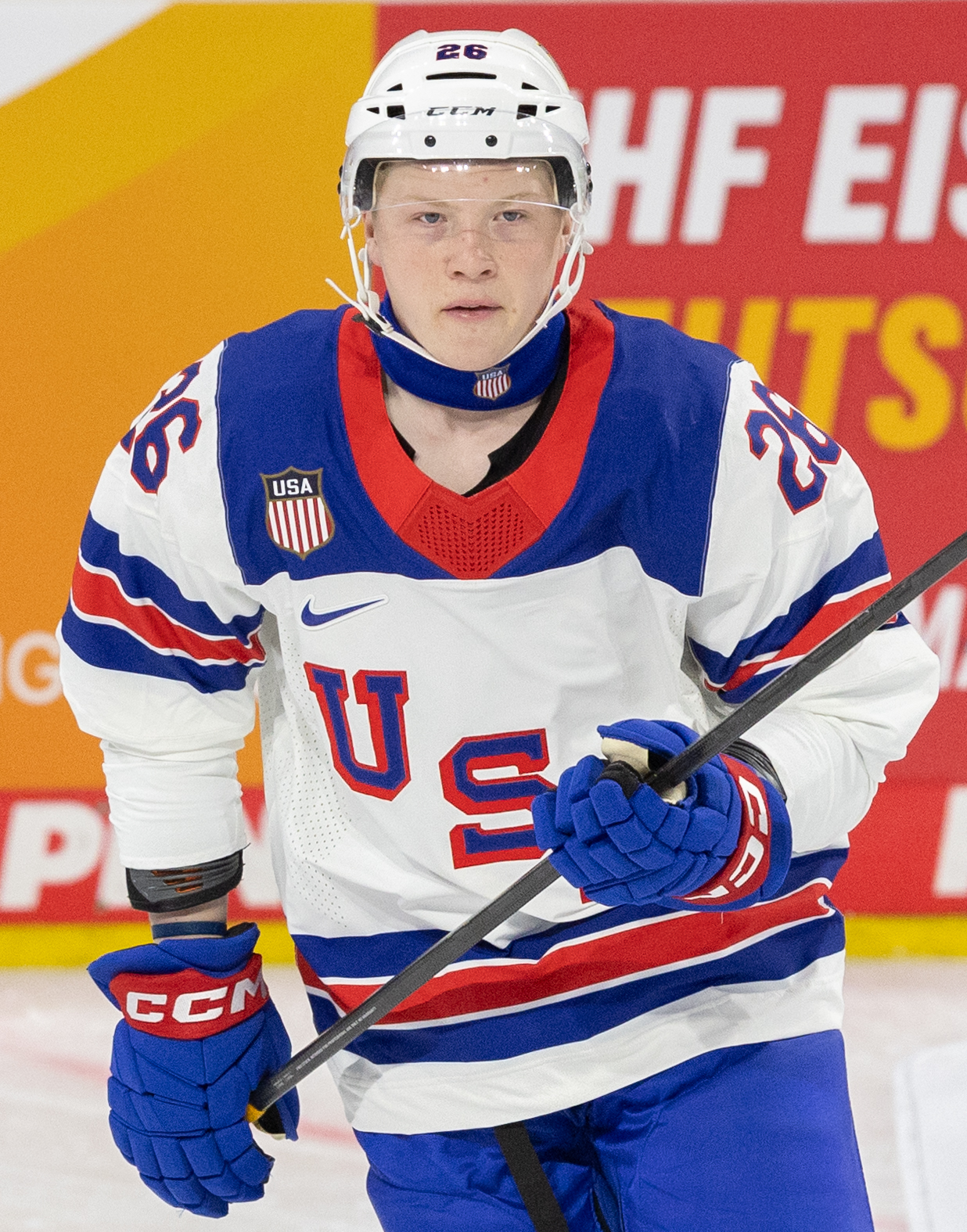
- Plante in 2026
- Born: February 20, 2006 (age 20) Duluth, Minnesota, U.S.
- Height: 5 ft 11 in (180 cm)
- Weight: 170 lb (77 kg; 12 st 2 lb)
- Position: Left wing
- Shoots: Left
- NCHC team: Minnesota Duluth
- National team: United States
- NHL draft: 47th overall, 2024; Detroit Red Wings
- Playing career: 2026–present

Max Plante (born February 20, 2006) is an American college ice hockey player who is a left winger for the University of Minnesota Duluth of the National Collegiate Athletic Association (NCAA). He was drafted 47th overall by the Detroit Red Wings in the 2024 NHL entry draft. He won the Hobey Baker Award in 2026.

== Playing career ==
On August 2, 2022, Plante committed to play college ice hockey at Minnesota Duluth. On June 29, 2024, Plante was drafted in the second round, 47th overall, by the Detroit Red Wings in the 2024 NHL entry draft

During the 2024–25 season, in his freshman year, he recorded nine goals and 19 assists in 23 games. He led all NCHC rookies with 21 points in conference play, despite only playing 20 NCHC games due to injury. Following the season he was named to the All-NCHC Rookie Team, and named a finalist for the NCHC Rookie of the Year.

During the 2025–26 season, in his sophomore year, he led the team in scoring 25 goals and 27 assists in 40 games. He tied for second among all NCAA players in goals and third in points. During October 2025, he led the NCHC and tied for first nationally with 18 points. He scored nine goals and nine assists in nine games. His nine goals tied for second in the NCAA during the month. He was subsequently named the HCA National Co-Forward of the Month for October. During conference play he ranked fifth in scoring, with 12 goals and 13 assists in 24 games. He was the first player this season to reach 40 points. Following the season he was the lone unanimous selection to the All-NCHC First Team, and was named the NCHC Forward of the Year and the NCHC Player of the Year. He became the first Bulldog to win the award. He was also named the Hobey Baker Award winner, and an AHCA West First Team All-American. His 52 points are the most by a Minnesota Duluth player since the 2011–12 season.

== International play ==
Medal record

Representing United States

Ice hockey

World Junior Championships
Gold medal – first place	2025 Canada	

World U18 Championships
Silver medal – second place	2024 Finland	

Plante represented the United States at the 2024 IIHF World U18 Championships, where he recorded two goals and nine assists in seven games and won a silver medal.

On December 18, 2024, he was named to the United States men's national junior ice hockey team to compete at the 2025 World Junior Ice Hockey Championships. During the tournament he recorded one goal and two assists in six games and won a gold medal

On December 24 2025, he was again named to the United States men's national junior ice hockey team to compete at the 2026 World Junior Ice Hockey Championships. During the tournament he recorded one goal in three games, and was eliminated in the quarterfinals by Finland. On December 29, 2025, he was injured during a preliminary round game against Slovakia.

== Personal life ==
Plante was born to Derek Plante, a former professional ice hockey player, and Kristi Plante. Plante has an older brother, Zam, and younger brother, Victor, both of whom play with him on the University of Minnesota-Duluth Bulldogs.

== Career statistics ==
=== Regular season and playoffs ===
			Regular season					Playoffs
Season	Team	League	GP	G	A	Pts	PIM	GP	G	A	Pts	PIM
2022–23	U.S. National Development Team	USHL	32	5	19	24	18	3	1	0	1	0
2023–24	U.S. National Development Team	USHL	25	6	23	29	6	—	—	—	—	—
2024–25	University of Minnesota Duluth	NCHC	23	9	19	28	16	—	—	—	—	—
2025–26	University of Minnesota Duluth	NCHC	40	25	27	52	23	—	—	—	—	—
NCAA totals			63	34	46	80	39	—	—	—	—	—

=== International ===
Year	Team	Event	Result	GP	G	A	Pts	PIM
2022	United States	U17	1st place, gold medalist(s)	7	0	10	10	0
2024	United States	U18	2nd place, silver medalist(s)	7	2	9	11	2
2025	United States	WJC	1st place, gold medalist(s)	6	1	2	3	4
2026	United States	WJC	5th	3	1	0	1	0
2026	United States	WC	8th	6	1	0	1	0
Junior totals				23	4	21	25	6
Senior totals				6	1	0	1	0

== Awards and honors ==
Award	Year
College
All-NCHC Rookie Team	2025
All-NCHC First Team	2026
NCHC Forward of the Year	2026
NCHC Player of the Year	2026
Hobey Baker Award	2026
AHCA West First Team All-American	2026

Awards and achievements
Preceded by Alex Bump	NCHC Forward of the Year; 2025–26	Succeeded by Incumbent
Preceded by Isaac Howard	Hobey Baker Award; 2025–26	Succeeded by Incumbent
