= 2025–26 Colorado College Tigers men's ice hockey season =

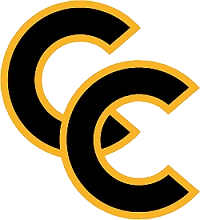
- Conference: NCHC
- Home ice: Ed Robson Arena

Record
- Overall: 13–17–6
- Conference: 7–11–6
- Home: 6–9–2
- Road: 7–8–4

Coaches and captains
- Head coach: Kris Mayotte
- Assistant coaches: Paul Pooley; John Lidgett; Jordy Murray

The 2025–26 Colorado College Tigers men's ice hockey season will be the 86th season of play for the program and the 13th in the NCHC. The Tigers will represent Colorado College in the 2025–26 NCAA Division I men's ice hockey season, play their home games at the Ed Robson Arena and be coached by Kris Mayotte, in his 5th season.

== Departures ==
Player	Position	Nationality	Cause
Ryan Beck	Forward	United States	Transferred to Lake Superior State
Brady Cleveland	Defenseman	United States	Transferred to Minnesota Duluth
Tyler Coffey	Forward	United States	Graduation (signed with Jacksonville Icemen)
Stan Cooley	Forward	Canada	Graduation (retired)
Tyler Dunbar	Defenseman	United States	Transferred to Union
Ty Gallagher	Defenseman	United States	Graduation (signed with Boston Bruins)
Noah Laba	Forward	United States	Signed professional contract (New York Rangers)
Chase McLane	Forward	United States	Graduation (retired)
Tommy Middleton	Forward	United States	Graduation (retired)
Carsen Musser	Goaltender	United States	Transferred to St. Thomas
Ethan Straky	Defenseman	United States	Transferred to Ohio State
Charlie Strobel	Forward	United States	Left program (retired)
Gleb Veremyev	Forward	United States	Signed professional contract (New York Islanders)
Henry Wilder	Goaltender	United States	Graduation (retired)
Zaccharya Wisdom	Forward	Canada	Transferred to Western Michigan

== Recruiting ==
Player	Position	Nationality	Age	Notes
Ryan Alexander	Forward	Canada	23	Toronto, ON; transfer from Arizona State
Wilson Björck	Forward	Sweden	19	Stockholm, SWE; selected 143rd overall in 2025
Seth Constance	Defenseman	United States	20	Northville, MI; transfer from Northeastern
Beckham Dempsey	Goaltender	United States	20	Wayne, IL
Connor Hvidston	Forward	Canada	21	Tisdale, SK; selected 129th overall in 2022
Shane Kozlina	Forward	United States	21	Cranberry Township, PA
Brandon Lisowsky	Forward	Canada	21	Port Coquitlam, BC; selected 218th overall in 2022
Matteo Mann	Defenseman	Canada	20	Sackville, NB; selected 199th overall in 2023
Mateo Mrsic	Forward	Canada	21	Cloverdale, BC
Tomas Mrsic	Forward	United States	19	Surrey, BC; selected 113th overall in 2024
Colton Roberts	Defenseman	Canada	19	North Vancouver, BC; selected 131st overall in 2024
Brayden Schuurman	Forward	Canada	21	Abbotsford, BC
Merril Steenari	Forward	United States	21	Aliso Viejo, CA
Jackson Unger	Goaltender	Canada	20	Calgary, AB

== Roster ==
As of August 11, 2025.

No.	Nat.	Player	Class	Pos	Height	Weight	DoB	Hometown	Previous team	NHL rights
1	(United States)	Beckham Dempsey	Freshman	G	6' 1" (1.85 m)	183 lb (83 kg)	2004-09-06	Wayne, Illinois	Boston Junior Rangers (NCDC)	—
3	(United States)	Seth Constance	Sophomore	D	6' 2" (1.88 m)	187 lb (85 kg)	2004-10-26	Northville, Michigan	Northeastern (HEA)	—
4	(United States)	Max Burkholder	Junior	D	5' 9" (1.75 m)	176 lb (80 kg)	2003-08-08	Chaska, Minnesota	Dubuque Fighting Saints (USHL)	—
5	(United States)	Ryan Koering	Sophomore	D	6' 3" (1.91 m)	187 lb (85 kg)	2005-02-11	Eden Prairie, Minnesota	Muskegon Lumberjacks (USHL)	—
6	(Canada)	Colton Roberts	Freshman	D	6' 4" (1.93 m)	209 lb (95 kg)	2006-06-08	North Vancouver, British Columbia	Vancouver Giants (WHL)	SJS, 131st overall 2024
7	(United States)	Philippe Blais-Savoie	Sophomore	D	6' 0" (1.83 m)	185 lb (84 kg)	2005-06-10	San Jose, California	Tri-City Storm (USHL)	—
8	(Canada)	Brandon Lisowsky	Freshman	F	5' 9" (1.75 m)	183 lb (83 kg)	2004-04-13	Port Coquitlam, British Columbia	Victoria Royals (WHL)	TOR, 218th overall 2022
9	(Canada)	Owen Beckner	Sophomore	F	6' 2" (1.88 m)	181 lb (82 kg)	2005-02-27	Victoria, British Columbia	Tri-City Storm (USHL)	OTT, 204th overall 2023
10	(United States)	Bret Link	Junior	F	6' 3" (1.91 m)	188 lb (85 kg)	2002-04-09	Anchorage, Alaska	Fargo Force (USHL)	—
11	(United States)	Shane Kozlina	Freshman	F	5' 11" (1.8 m)	174 lb (79 kg)	2004-06-23	Cranberry Township, Pennsylvania	Maine Nordiques (NAHL)	—
12	(United States)	Merril Steenari	Freshman	F	5' 10" (1.78 m)	181 lb (82 kg)	2004-01-18	Aliso Viejo, California	Fargo Force (USHL)	—
14	(Canada)	Connor Hvidston	Freshman	F	6' 3" (1.91 m)	185 lb (84 kg)	2004-09-11	Tisdale, Saskatchewan	Calgary Hitmen (WHL)	ANA, 139th overall 2022
15	(United States)	Nick Baer	Sophomore	D	6' 0" (1.83 m)	181 lb (82 kg)	2004-03-14	Minnetonka, Minnesota	Bismarck Bobcats (NAHL)	—
17	(Canada)	Tomas Mrsic	Freshman	F	6' 0" (1.83 m)	174 lb (79 kg)	2006-02-26	Surrey, British Columbia	Prince Albert Raiders (WHL)	STL, 113th overall 2024
18	(United States)	Fisher Scott	Sophomore	D	6' 2" (1.88 m)	179 lb (81 kg)	2004-10-27	Carbondale, Colorado	Dubuque Fighting Saints (USHL)	DET, 208th overall 2024
19	(Canada)	Mateo Mrsic	Freshman	F	5' 11" (1.8 m)	185 lb (84 kg)	2004-08-29	Cloverdale, British Columbia	Chilliwack Chiefs (BCHL)	—
20	(United States)	Gavin Lindberg	Sophomore	F	6' 0" (1.83 m)	192 lb (87 kg)	2004-04-20	Fergus Falls, Minnesota	Waterloo Black Hawks (USHL)	—
21	(Canada)	Ryan Alexander	Senior	F	5' 10" (1.78 m)	178 lb (81 kg)	2002-06-17	Toronto, Ontario	Arizona State (NCHC)	—
22	(United States)	Jordan Brisson	Sophomore	F	6' 1" (1.85 m)	185 lb (84 kg)	2003-12-01	Manhattan Beach, California	Chicago Steel (USHL)	—
24	(Latvia)	Klāvs Veinbergs	Junior	F	6' 3" (1.91 m)	198 lb (90 kg)	2003-03-27	Riga, Latvia	Lincoln Stars (USHL)	TBL, 224th overall 2022
25	(United States)	Riley Stuart	Junior	F	6' 2" (1.88 m)	201 lb (91 kg)	2002-01-17	Phoenix, Arizona	Dubuque Fighting Saints (USHL)	—
26	(Sweden)	Wilson Björck	Freshman	F	6' 0" (1.83 m)	165 lb (75 kg)	2006-01-13	Stockholm, Sweden	Djurgårdens IF U20 (J20 Nationell)	VAN, 143rd overall 2025
27	(Canada)	Matteo Mann	Freshman	D	6' 6" (1.98 m)	229 lb (104 kg)	2004-12-31	Sackville, New Brunswick	Saint John Sea Dogs (QMJHL)	PHI, 199th overall 2023
28	(Canada)	Brayden Schuurman	Freshman	F	5' 10" (1.78 m)	201 lb (91 kg)	2004-02-22	Abbotsford, British Columbia	Seattle Thunderbirds (WHL)	—
29	(United States)	Drew Montgomery	Junior	F	5' 11" (1.8 m)	174 lb (79 kg)	2003-03-27	Grand Forks, North Dakota	Omaha Lancers (USHL)	—
30	(Canada)	Jackson Unger	Freshman	G	6' 2" (1.88 m)	190 lb (86 kg)	2005-01-13	Calgary, Alberta	Lethbridge Hurricanes (WHL)	—
33	(United States)	Kaidan Mbereko	Junior	G	5' 11" (1.8 m)	185 lb (84 kg)	2003-07-28	Aspen, Colorado	Lincoln Stars (USHL)	—

== Standings ==
2025–26 National Collegiate Hockey Conference Standings
	Conference record										Overall record					
	GP	W	L	T	OTW	OTL	SW	PTS	GF	GA	GP	W	L	T	GF	GA
#4 North Dakota †	24	17	6	1	1	4	0	55	96	58	40	29	10	1	151	90
#1 Denver *	24	17	6	1	2	1	1	52	82	51	43	29	11	3	154	90
#6 Western Michigan	24	16	7	1	3	1	1	48	89	65	39	27	11	1	140	95
#7 Minnesota Duluth	24	11	12	1	3	4	1	36	64	66	40	24	15	1	130	99
St. Cloud State	24	9	14	1	1	2	1	30	63	86	36	16	19	1	112	112
Colorado College	24	7	11	6	2	3	1	29	63	66	36	13	17	6	95	98
Miami	24	9	13	2	3	1	1	28	60	74	36	18	16	2	104	108
Omaha	24	8	16	0	0	0	0	24	57	86	36	12	24	0	95	129
Arizona State	24	7	16	1	2	1	1	22	62	94	36	14	21	1	106	132
Championship: March 21, 2026 † indicates conference regular season champion (Penrose Cup) * indicates conference tournament champion (National Cup); Rankings: USCHO.com Top 20 Poll; updated April 13, 2026

== Schedule and results ==
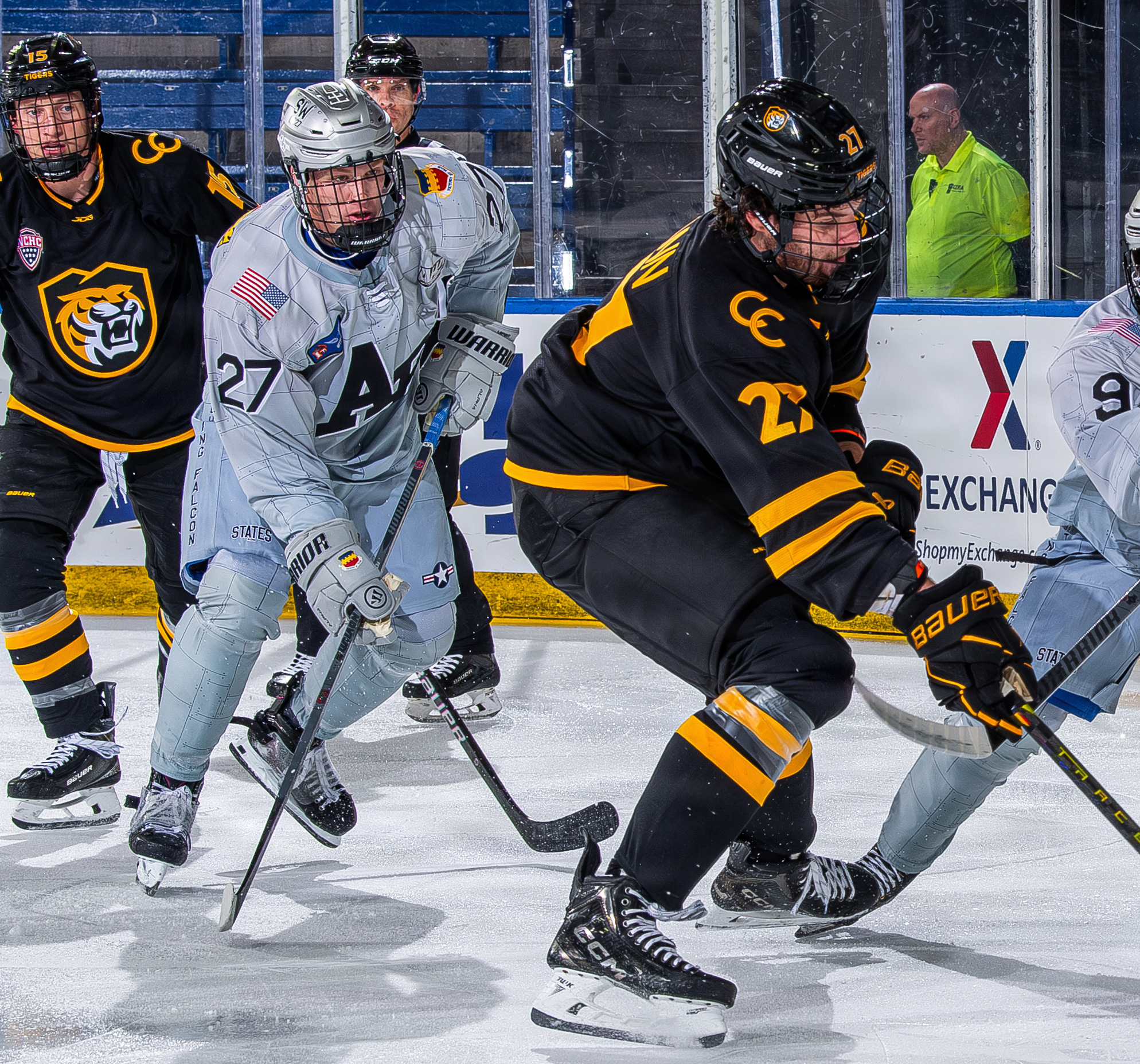
October 11 against Air Force

Date	Time	Opponent^{#}	Rank^{#}	Site	TV	Decision	Result	Attendance	Record
Regular Season
October 3	7:00 pm	#10 Connecticut*		Ed Robson Arena • Colorado Springs, Colorado	SOCO CW	Mbereko	W 4–2	3,532	1–0–0
October 4	6:00 pm	#10 Connecticut*		Ed Robson Arena • Colorado Springs, Colorado		Mbereko	L 1–5	3,532	1–1–0
October 10	7:00 pm	Bentley*		Ed Robson Arena • Colorado Springs, Colorado		Mbereko	W 5–2	3,532	2–1–0
October 11	5:00 pm	at Air Force*		Cadet Ice Arena • Colorado Springs, Colorado (Rivalry)	Altitude 2, FloHockey	Mbereko	W 4–2	2,560	3–1–0
October 17	5:00 pm	at Northern Michigan*	#19	Berry Events Center • Marquette, Michigan	Midco Sports+	Mbereko	W 2–1 ^{OT}	2,617	4–1–0
October 18	4:00 pm	at Northern Michigan*	#19	Berry Events Center • Marquette, Michigan	Midco Sports+	Mbereko	W 5–2	2,405	5–1–0
October 31	7:00 pm	Omaha	#15	Ed Robson Arena • Colorado Springs, Colorado	SOCO CW	Mbereko	L 2–3	3,407	5–2–0 (0–1–0)
November 1	7:00 pm	Omaha	#15	Ed Robson Arena • Colorado Springs, Colorado		Mbereko	L 4–5	3,532	5–3–0 (0–2–0)
November 7	7:00 pm	at Arizona State	#20	Mullett Arena • Tempe, Arizona	SOCO CW	Mbereko	T 3–3 ^{SOL}	4,924	5–3–1 (0–2–1)
November 8	5:00 pm	at Arizona State	#20	Mullett Arena • Tempe, Arizona		Mbereko	W 3–1	4,922	6–3–1 (1–2–1)
November 14	7:00 pm	at #4 Denver	#17	Magness Arena • Denver, Colorado (Rivalry)	Altitude	Mbereko	L 1–2 ^{OT}	7,073	6–4–1 (1–3–1)
November 15	5:00 pm	#4 Denver	#17	Ed Robson Arena • Colorado Springs, Colorado (Rivalry)		Mbereko	L 2–3	3,532	6–5–1 (1–4–1)
November 21	7:00 pm	#4 Minnesota Duluth		Ed Robson Arena • Colorado Springs, Colorado	SOCO CW	Mbereko	L 2–4	3,457	6–6–1 (1–5–1)
November 22	6:00 pm	#4 Minnesota Duluth		Ed Robson Arena • Colorado Springs, Colorado		Mbereko	W 2–1	3,417	7–6–1 (2–5–1)
November 28	7:00 pm	#16 Providence*		Ed Robson Arena • Colorado Springs, Colorado	SOCO CW, NESN	Mbereko	W 3–2	3,407	8–6–1
November 29	6:00 pm	#16 Providence*		Ed Robson Arena • Colorado Springs, Colorado		Unger	L 1–2	3,407	8–7–1
December 12	5:00 pm	at Miami	#19	Steve Cady Arena • Oxford, Ohio	RESN	Mbereko	T 4–4 ^{SOL}	1,521	8–7–2 (2–5–2)
December 13	4:00 pm	at Miami	#19	Steve Cady Arena • Oxford, Ohio	RESN	Mbereko	T 3–3 ^{SOW}	1,003	8–7–3 (2–5–3)
January 2	6:00 pm	at Augustana*		Midco Arena • Sioux Falls, South Dakota	SOCO CW, Midco Sports+	Mbereko	L 2–3	2,665	8–8–3
January 3	5:00 pm	at Augustana*		Midco Arena • Sioux Falls, South Dakota	Midco Sports+	Mbereko	L 2–4	2,665	8–9–3
January 9	7:00 pm	#4 North Dakota		Ed Robson Arena • Colorado Springs, Colorado	SOCO CW	Mbereko	W 3–2 ^{OT}	3,532	9–9–3 (3–5–3)
January 10	6:00 pm	#4 North Dakota		Ed Robson Arena • Colorado Springs, Colorado	ABC 13	Mbereko	L 2–5	3,532	9–10–3 (3–6–3)
January 17	4:00 pm	Simon Fraser*		Ed Robson Arena • Colorado Springs, Colorado (Exhibition)		Unger	W 8–3	3,530	
January 23	6:00 pm	at Omaha		Baxter Arena • Omaha, Nebraska		Mbereko	L 1–3	5,990	9–11–3 (3–7–3)
January 24	6:00 pm	at Omaha		Baxter Arena • Omaha, Nebraska		Mbereko	W 3–1	6,705	10–11–3 (4–7–3)
January 30	7:00 pm	Arizona State		Ed Robson Arena • Colorado Springs, Colorado	SOCO CW, SNP	Unger	L 5–6 ^{OT}	3,532	10–12–3 (4–8–3)
January 31	6:00 pm	Arizona State		Ed Robson Arena • Colorado Springs, Colorado		Unger	W 4–1	3,539	11–12–3 (5–8–3)
February 6	7:00 pm	#8 Denver		Ed Robson Arena • Colorado Springs, Colorado (Rivalry)	SOCO CW	Unger	T 2–2 ^{SOL}	3,547	11–12–4 (5–8–4)
February 7	7:00 pm	at #8 Denver		Magness Arena • Denver, Colorado (Rivalry)		Mbereko	L 1–4	7,082	11–13–4 (5–9–4)
February 13	6:00 pm	at St. Cloud State		Herb Brooks National Hockey Center • St. Cloud, Minnesota	SOCO CW, The CW	Unger	L 5–6 ^{OT}	3,566	11–14–4 (5–10–4)
February 14	5:00 pm	at St. Cloud State		Herb Brooks National Hockey Center • St. Cloud, Minnesota	The CW	Mbereko	W 4–1	4,183	12–14–4 (6–10–4)
February 20	7:00 pm	#4 Western Michigan		Ed Robson Arena • Colorado Springs, Colorado	SOCO CW	Mbereko	T 1–1 ^{SOL}	3,532	12–14–5 (6–10–5)
February 21	6:00 pm	#4 Western Michigan		Ed Robson Arena • Colorado Springs, Colorado		Mbereko	L 0–2	3,532	12–15–5 (6–11–5)
February 27	6:07 pm	at #9 Minnesota Duluth		Amsoil Arena • Duluth, Minnesota	My9, SOCO CW	Mbereko	W 4–1	5,437	13–15–5 (7–11–5)
February 28	5:07 pm	at #9 Minnesota Duluth		Amsoil Arena • Duluth, Minnesota	My9	Unger	T 2–2 ^{SOL}	5,812	13–15–6 (7–11–6)
NCHC Tournament
March 6	5:00 pm	at #4 Western Michigan*		Lawson Arena • Kalamazoo, Michigan (NCHC Quarterfinal Game 1)		Mbereko	L 2–5	2,675	13–16–6
March 7	4:00 pm	at #4 Western Michigan*		Lawson Arena • Kalamazoo, Michigan (NCHC Quarterfinal Game 2)		Unger	L 1–2	2,945	13–17–6
*Non-conference game. ^{#}Rankings from USCHO.com Poll. All times are in Mountain Time. Source:

== Rankings ==
Ranking movements Legend: ██ Increase in ranking ██ Decrease in ranking — = Not ranked RV = Received votes
	Week																											
Poll	Pre	1	2	3	4	5	6	7	8	9	10	11	12	13	14	15	16	17	18	19	20	21	22	23	24	25	26	Final
USCHO.com	RV	RV	19	16	15	20	17	RV	RV	20	19	RV	*	RV	RV	RV	RV	RV	RV	—	RV	—	RV	—	—			
USA Hockey	RV	RV	20	17	16	19	17	RV	RV	RV	19	RV	*	RV	—	—	—	—	—	—	—	—	—	—	—			

Note: USCHO did not release a week 12 poll
Note: USA Hockey did not release a week 12 poll
