= 2025–26 North Dakota Fighting Hawks men's ice hockey season =

NCHC, Champion NCAA tournament, Frozen Four
- Conference: NCHC
- Home ice: Ralph Engelstad Arena

Rankings
- USCHO: #4
- USA Hockey: #4

Record
- Overall: 29–10–1
- Conference: 17–6–1
- Home: 15–5–1
- Road: 12–4–0
- Neutral: 2–1–0

Coaches and captains
- Head coach: Dane Jackson
- Assistant coaches: Matt Smaby; Dillon Simpson; Bryn Chyzyk
- Captain: Bennett Zmolek
- Alternate captain(s): Dylan James; Jake Livanavage; Ben Strinden; Abram Wiebe

The 2025–26 North Dakota Fighting Hawks men's ice hockey season was the 86th season of play for the program and 13th in the NCHC. The Fighting Hawks represented the University of North Dakota in the 2025–26 NCAA Division I men's ice hockey season, played their home games at Ralph Engelstad Arena and were coached by Dane Jackson in his first season as head coach. The team wore new sweaters this season, which were revealed on July 24, 2025.

== Departures ==
Player	Position	Nationality	Cause
Cameron Berg	Forward	United States	Graduation (signed with Bridgeport Islanders)
Sacha Boisvert	Forward	Canada	Transferred to Boston University
Hobie Hedquist	Goaltender	United States	Transferred to Ferris State
Aleksi Huson	Goaltender	United States	Left program (retired)
Louis Jamernik V	Forward	Canada	Graduation (retired)
Kaleb Johnson	Goaltender	United States	Graduation (retired)
Tanner Komzak	Defense	Canada	Transferred to Mount Royal University (U Sports)
Jackson Kunz	Forward	United States	Graduation (signed with Abbotsford Canucks)
Caleb MacDonald	Defense	United States	Signed professional contract (Columbus Blue Jackets)
Owen McLaughlin	Forward	United States	Transferred to Boston University
Dane Montgomery	Defense/Forward	United States	Graduation (signed with Stuttgart Rebels)
Jayden Perron	Forward	Canada	Transferred to Michigan
T.J. Semptimphelter	Goaltender	United States	Graduation (signed with Bridgeport Islanders)
Jake Schmaltz	Forward	United States	Graduation (signed with Providence Bruins)
Carter Wilkie	Forward	Canada	Graduation (signed with Calgary Wranglers)

== Recruiting ==
Player	Position	Nationality	Age	Notes
Ian Engel	Defense	United States	21	Hortonville, WI
Gibson Homer	Goaltender	United States	21	Grand Rapids, MI; transfer from Arizona State
Ollie Josephson	Forward	Canada	19	Victoria, BC; selected 105th overall in 2024
Jack Kernan	Forward	United States	20	Maple Grove, MN
David Klee	Forward	United States	20	Castle Rock, CO; selected 196th overall in 2023
Sam Laurila	Forward	United States	18	Moorhead, MN; selected 138th overall in 2025
Anthony Menghini	Forward	United States	22	Brainerd, MN; transfer from Minnesota Duluth
Cole Reschny	Forward	Canada	18	Macklin, SK; selected 18th overall in 2025
Ellis Rickwood	Forward	Canada	22	Brantford, ON; transfer from Clarkson
Zach Sandy	Goaltender	United States	22	Fargo, ND; transfer from Minnesota Duluth
Jan Špunar	Goaltender	Czech Republic	21	Olomouc, CZ
Keaton Verhoeff	Defense	Canada	17	Fort Saskatchewan, AB
Tyler Young	Forward	United States	24	Lancaster, MA; transfer from Merrimack
Josh Zakreski	Forward	Canada	19	Saskatoon, SK
Will Zellers	Forward	United States	19	Maple Grove, MN; selected 76th overall in 2024

== Roster ==
As of January 21, 2025.

No.	Nat.	Player	Class	Pos	Height	Weight	DoB	Hometown	Previous team	NHL rights
1	(United States)	Zach Sandy	Junior (RS)	G	6' 0" (1.83 m)	185 lb (84 kg)	2002-12-05	Fargo, North Dakota	Minnesota Duluth (NCHC)	—
2	(United States)	Bennett Zmolek (C)	Graduate (RS)	D	6' 3" (1.91 m)	195 lb (88 kg)	2002-04-17	Rochester, Minnesota	Minnesota State (CCHA)	—
3	(Canada)	Jayden Jubenvill	Sophomore	D	6' 0" (1.83 m)	190 lb (86 kg)	2003-06-19	Gilbert Plains, Manitoba	Dubuque (USHL)	—
4	(United States)	Jake Livanavage (A)	Junior	D	5' 11" (1.8 m)	190 lb (86 kg)	2004-05-06	Phoenix, Arizona	Chicago (USHL)	—
6	(United States)	EJ Emery	Sophomore	D	6' 3" (1.91 m)	185 lb (84 kg)	2006-03-30	Compton, California	USNTDP (USHL)	NYR, 30th overall 2024
7	(United States)	Mac Swanson	Sophomore	F	5' 8" (1.73 m)	175 lb (79 kg)	2006-01-10	Anchorage, Alaska	Fargo (USHL)	PIT, 207th overall 2024
8	(Canada)	Ollie Josephson	Freshman	F	6' 1" (1.85 m)	191 lb (87 kg)	2006-07-22	Victoria, British Columbia	Red Deer (WHL)	SEA, 105nd overall 2024
9	(United States)	Will Zellers	Freshman	F	6' 0" (1.83 m)	180 lb (82 kg)	2006-04-04	Maple Grove, Minnesota	Green Bay (USHL)	BOS, 76th overall 2024
11	(United States)	Ian Engel	Freshman	D	5' 11" (1.8 m)	185 lb (84 kg)	2004-05-13	Hortonville, Wisconsin	Bismarck (NAHL)	—
13	(United States)	Sam Laurila	Freshman	D	6' 1" (1.85 m)	193 lb (88 kg)	2006-09-02	Moorhead, Minnesota	Fargo (USHL)	NYI, 138th overall 2025
14	(United States)	Tyler Young	Senior	F	6' 1" (1.85 m)	185 lb (84 kg)	2001-05-08	Lancaster, Massachusetts	Merrimack (HEA)	—
15	(United States)	Jack Kernan	Freshman	F	6' 2" (1.88 m)	200 lb (91 kg)	2005-03-30	Maple Grove, Minnesota	Des Moines (USHL)	—
16	(United States)	Andrew Strathmann	Sophomore	D	5' 11" (1.8 m)	190 lb (86 kg)	2005-02-27	Beach Park, Illinois	Youngstown (USHL)	CBJ, 98th overall 2023
17	(Canada)	Cole Reschny	Freshman	F	5' 11" (1.8 m)	185 lb (84 kg)	2007-04-06	Macklin, Saskatchewan	Victoria (WHL)	CGY, 18th overall 2025
18	(Canada)	Keaton Verhoeff	Freshman	D	6' 4" (1.93 m)	215 lb (98 kg)	2008-06-19	Fort Saskatchewan, Alberta	Victoria (WHL)	—
19	(United States)	Cody Croal	Sophomore	F	5' 11" (1.8 m)	185 lb (84 kg)	2003-06-17	North Branch, Minnesota	Muskegon (USHL)	—
20	(United States)	Cade Littler	Sophomore	F	6' 4" (1.93 m)	205 lb (93 kg)	2004-07-12	East Wenatchee, Washington	Penticton (BCHL)	CGY, 219th overall 2022
21	(United States)	Ben Strinden (A)	Senior	F	6' 1" (1.85 m)	205 lb (93 kg)	2002-06-04	Fargo, North Dakota	Muskegon (USHL)	NSH, 210th overall 2022
22	(United States)	David Klee	Freshman	F	6' 4" (1.93 m)	205 lb (93 kg)	2005-05-10	Castle Rock, Colorado	Muskegon (USHL)	SJS, 196th overall 2023
24	(Canada)	Josh Zakreski	Freshman	F	6' 0" (1.83 m)	197 lb (89 kg)	2005-12-17	Saskatoon, Saskatchewan	Portland (WHL)	—
25	(Canada)	Abram Wiebe (A)	Junior	D	6' 3" (1.91 m)	210 lb (95 kg)	2003-08-28	Mission, British Columbia	Chilliwack (BCHL)	CGY, 209th overall 2022
26	(Canada)	Dylan James (A)	Senior	F	6' 1" (1.85 m)	193 lb (88 kg)	2003-10-12	Calgary, Alberta	Sioux City (USHL)	DET, 40th overall 2022
27	(United States)	Anthony Menghini	Junior	F	5' 10" (1.78 m)	195 lb (88 kg)	2002-12-03	Brainerd, Minnesota	Minnesota Duluth (NCHC)	—
28	(Canada)	Dalton Andrew	Sophomore	F	6' 4" (1.93 m)	215 lb (98 kg)	2003-08-05	Brandon, Manitoba	Winkler (MJHL)	—
29	(Canada)	Ellis Rickwood	Senior	F	6' 2" (1.88 m)	205 lb (93 kg)	2002-07-02	Brantford, Ontario	Clarkson (ECAC)	—
31	(United States)	Gibson Homer	Graduate	G	6' 6" (1.98 m)	205 lb (93 kg)	2003-12-29	Grand Rapids, Michigan	Arizona State (NCHC)	—
35	(Czech Republic)	Jan Špunar	Freshman	G	6' 3" (1.91 m)	200 lb (91 kg)	2004-05-30	Olomouc, Czech Republic	Dubuque (USHL)	—

1.Zellers was selected by the Colorado Avalanche in 2024, but his NHL rights were traded to the Boston Bruins on March 7, 2025.
2.Wiebe was selected by the Vegas Golden Knights in 2022, but his NHL rights were traded to the Calgary Flames on January 18, 2026.

== Standings ==
2025–26 National Collegiate Hockey Conference Standings
	Conference record										Overall record					
	GP	W	L	T	OTW	OTL	SW	PTS	GF	GA	GP	W	L	T	GF	GA
#4 North Dakota †	24	17	6	1	1	4	0	55	96	58	40	29	10	1	151	90
#1 Denver *	24	17	6	1	2	1	1	52	82	51	43	29	11	3	154	90
#6 Western Michigan	24	16	7	1	3	1	1	48	89	65	39	27	11	1	140	95
#7 Minnesota Duluth	24	11	12	1	3	4	1	36	64	66	40	24	15	1	130	99
St. Cloud State	24	9	14	1	1	2	1	30	63	86	36	16	19	1	112	112
Colorado College	24	7	11	6	2	3	1	29	63	66	36	13	17	6	95	98
Miami	24	9	13	2	3	1	1	28	60	74	36	18	16	2	104	108
Omaha	24	8	16	0	0	0	0	24	57	86	36	12	24	0	95	129
Arizona State	24	7	16	1	2	1	1	22	62	94	36	14	21	1	106	132
Championship: March 21, 2026 † indicates conference regular season champion (Penrose Cup) * indicates conference tournament champion (National Cup); Rankings: USCHO.com Top 20 Poll; updated April 13, 2026

== Schedule and results ==
Date	Time	Opponent^{#}	Rank^{#}	Site	TV	Decision	Result	Attendance	Record
Exhibition
October 4	6:07 pm	Manitoba*	#11	Ralph Engelstad Arena • Grand Forks, North Dakota (Exhibition)	Midco Sports	Homer	W 7–0	11,575	—
Regular Season
October 10	7:07 pm	#19 St. Thomas*	#10	Ralph Engelstad Arena • Grand Forks, North Dakota	Midco Sports	Homer	W 6–2	11,627	1–0–0
October 12	5:30 pm	at #19 St. Thomas*	#10	Grand Casino Arena • St. Paul, Minnesota	Midco Sports Plus	Homer	W 5–2	6,127	2–0–0
October 17	7:07 pm	#13 Minnesota*	#8	Ralph Engelstad Arena • Grand Forks, North Dakota (Rivalry)	Midco Sports	Homer	W 5–2	11,634	3–0–0
October 18	6:07 pm	#13 Minnesota*	#8	Ralph Engelstad Arena • Grand Forks, North Dakota (Rivalry)	Midco Sports	Homer	L 1–5	11,710	3–1–0
October 24	6:00 pm	at Clarkson*	#8	Cheel Arena • Potsdam, New York	ESPN+, SNY, TSN+	Homer	L 2–5	2,167	3–2–0
October 25	6:00 pm	at Clarkson*	#8	Cheel Arena • Potsdam, New York	ESPN+	Špunar	W 1–0	2,435	4–2–0
October 31	7:07 pm	#10 Minnesota Duluth	#8	Ralph Engelstad Arena • Grand Forks, North Dakota	Midco Sports, My9	Homer	L 4–3 ^{OT}	11,023	4–3–0 (0–1–0)
November 1	6:07 pm	#10 Minnesota Duluth	#8	Ralph Engelstad Arena • Grand Forks, North Dakota	Midco Sports, My9	Špunar	W 5–1	11,495	5–3–0 (1–1–0)
November 7	7:00 pm	at Omaha	#8	Baxter Arena • Omaha, Nebraska	NCHC.tv	Špunar	W 7–2	7,169	6–3–0 (2–1–0)
November 8	7:00 pm	at Omaha	#8	Baxter Arena • Omaha, Nebraska	NCHC.tv	Homer	W 4–1	6,859	7–3–0 (3–1–0)
November 14	7:07 pm	Arizona State	#6	Ralph Engelstad Arena • Grand Forks, North Dakota	Midco Sports, TSN5, Fox 10 Xtra	Špunar	W 5–2	11,572	8–3–0 (4–1–0)
November 15	6:07 pm	Arizona State	#6	Ralph Engelstad Arena • Grand Forks, North Dakota	Midco Sports, Fox 10 Xtra	Homer	L 2–4	11,590	8–4–0 (4–2–0)
Exhibition
November 21	7:07 pm	USNTDP*	#6	Ralph Engelstad Arena • Grand Forks, North Dakota (Exhibition)	Midco Sports	Homer	W 6–1	11,250	—
Regular Season
November 28	7:37 pm	at Bemidji State*	#6	Sanford Center • Bemidji, Minnesota	Midco Sports Plus	Špunar	W 5–3	4,243	9–4–0
November 29	7:07 pm	Bemidji State*	#6	Ralph Engelstad Arena • Grand Forks, North Dakota	Midco Sports, TSN2	Špunar	W 2–1 ^{OT}	11,573	10–4–0
December 5	7:00 pm	at St. Cloud State	#5	Herb Brooks National Hockey Center • St. Cloud, Minnesota	WUCW	Špunar	W 4–3	3,454	11–4–0 (5–2–0)
December 6	6:00 pm	at St. Cloud State	#5	Herb Brooks National Hockey Center • St. Cloud, Minnesota	WUCW	Špunar	W 4–2	4,622	12–4–0 (6–2–0)
December 12	7:07 pm	Omaha	#4	Ralph Engelstad Arena • Grand Forks, North Dakota	Midco Sports	Špunar	W 4–1	11,284	13–4–0 (7–2–0)
December 13	6:07 pm	Omaha	#4	Ralph Engelstad Arena • Grand Forks, North Dakota	Midco Sports	Homer	W 3–1	11,443	14–4–0 (8–2–0)
January 2	7:07 pm	Mercyhurst*	#4	Ralph Engelstad Arena • Grand Forks, North Dakota	Midco Sports	Špunar	W 2–0	11,571	15–4–0
January 3	6:07 pm	Mercyhurst*	#4	Ralph Engelstad Arena • Grand Forks, North Dakota	Midco Sports	Homer	W 6–1	11,586	16–4–0
January 9	8:00 pm	at Colorado College	#4	Ed Robson Arena • Colorado Springs, Colorado	SOCO CW	Špunar	L 2–3 ^{OT}	3,532	16–5–0 (8–3–0)
January 10	7:00 pm	at Colorado College	#4	Ed Robson Arena • Colorado Springs, Colorado	ABC 13	Špunar	W 5–2	3,532	17–5–0 (9–3–0)
January 16	7:07 pm	#9 Denver	#5	Ralph Engelstad Arena • Grand Forks, North Dakota (Rivalry)	Midco Sports	Špunar	W 5–0	11,571	18–5–0 (10–3–0)
January 17	6:07 pm	#9 Denver	#5	Ralph Engelstad Arena • Grand Forks, North Dakota (Rivalry)	Midco Sports	Špunar	L 3–2	11,673	18–6–0 (10–4–0)
January 23	8:00 pm	at Arizona State	#4	Mullett Arena • Tempe, Arizona	Fox 10, Midco Sports	Homer	W 7–4	5,100	19–6–0 (11–4–0)
January 24	6:00 pm	at Arizona State	#4	Mullett Arena • Tempe, Arizona	Fox 10, Midco Sports	Špunar	W 5–3	5,200	20–6–0 (12–4–0)
February 6	7:07 pm	at #10 Minnesota Duluth	#3	AMSOIL Arena • Duluth, Minnesota	My9, Midco Sports	Špunar	L 2–3 ^{OT}	6,668	20–7–0 (12–5–0)
February 7	6:07 pm	at #10 Minnesota Duluth	#3	AMSOIL Arena • Duluth, Minnesota	My9, Midco Sports	Špunar	W 4–1	6,869	21–7–0 (13–5–0)
February 13	7:07 pm	#20 Miami	#3	Ralph Engelstad Arena • Grand Forks, North Dakota	Midco Sports	Špunar	W 1–0	11,609	22–7–0 (14–5–0)
February 14	6:07 pm	#20 Miami	#3	Ralph Engelstad Arena • Grand Forks, North Dakota	Midco Sports	Špunar	W 4–3 ^{OT}	11,651	23–7–0 (15–5–0)
February 20	7:07 pm	St. Cloud State	#3	Ralph Engelstad Arena • Grand Forks, North Dakota	Midco Sports, TSN2	Špunar	T 4–4 ^{SOL}	11,647	23–7–1 (15–5–1)
February 21	6:07 pm	St. Cloud State	#3	Ralph Engelstad Arena • Grand Forks, North Dakota	Midco Sports	Homer	W 6–4	11,696	24–7–1 (16–5–1)
February 27	6:00 pm	at #4 Western Michigan	#3	Lawson Arena • Kalamazoo, Michigan	NCHC.tv	Špunar	W 5–3	4,103	25–7–1 (17–5–1)
February 28	5:00 pm	at #4 Western Michigan	#3	Lawson Arena • Kalamazoo, Michigan	NCHC.tv	Homer	L 3–4 ^{OT}	4,351	25–8–1 (17–6–1)
NCHC Tournament
March 6	7:07 pm	Omaha*	#3	Ralph Engelstad Arena • Grand Forks, North Dakota (Quarterfinal Game 1)	Midco Sports Two	Špunar	W 5–3	11,400	26–8–1
March 7	6:07 pm	Omaha*	#3	Ralph Engelstad Arena • Grand Forks, North Dakota (Quarterfinal Game 2)	Midco Sports	Špunar	W 5–1	11,569	27–8–1
March 14	6:07 pm	#8 Minnesota Duluth*	#2	Ralph Engelstad Arena • Grand Forks, North Dakota (Semifinals)	Midco Sports	Špunar	L 1–5	9,902	27–9–1
NCAA Tournament
March 26	7:30 pm	vs. #16 Merrimack*	#2	Denny Sanford PREMIER Center • Sioux Falls, South Dakota (Regional Semifinal)	ESPN2	Špunar	W 3–0	5,114	28–9–1
March 28	6:00 pm	vs. #11 Quinnipiac*	#2	Denny Sanford PREMIER Center • Sioux Falls, South Dakota (Regional Final)	ESPN2	Špunar	W 5–0	6,209	29–9–1
April 9	4:00 pm	vs. #12 Wisconsin*	#2	T-Mobile Arena • Las Vegas, Nevada (National Semifinal)	ESPN2	Špunar	L 1–2	17,942	29–10–1
*Non-conference game. ^{#}Rankings from USCHO.com Poll. All times are in Central Time. Source:

== Scoring statistics ==
Name	Position	Games	Goals	Assists	Points	PIM
Ellis Rickwood	F	35	9	28	37	19
Ben Strinden	F	38	15	20	35	8
Cole Reschny	F	36	6	29	35	22
Will Zellers	F	38	18	16	34	29
Dylan James	F	40	21	11	32	10
Abram Wiebe	D	40	5	24	29	6
Mac Swanson	F	40	11	17	28	4
Jake Livanavage	D	39	5	20	25	10
Jack Kernan	F	36	11	10	21	14
Ollie Josephson	F	38	6	14	20	2
Keaton Verhoeff	D	36	6	14	20	29
Cody Croal	F	35	10	4	14	16
Cade Littler	F	35	5	8	13	28
EJ Emery	D	38	3	10	13	32
Anthony Menghini	F	35	5	7	12	8
Tyler Young	F	32	5	7	12	6
Sam Laurila	D	35	1	9	10	29
David Klee	F	24	3	3	6	14
Andrew Strathmann	D	38	1	5	6	48
Josh Zakreski	F	15	3	2	5	6
Bennett Zmolek	D	33	1	3	4	30
Jayden Jubenville	D	15	0	2	2	18
Dalton Andrew	F	4	1	0	1	2
Ian Engel	D	2	0	0	0	0
Gibson Homer	G	14	0	0	0	2
Zach Sandy	G	1	0	0	0	0
Jan Špunar	G	28	0	0	0	2
Total			151	263	414	412

== Goaltending statistics ==
Name	Games	Minutes	Wins	Losses	Ties	Goals against	Saves	Shut outs	SV %	GAA
Jan Špunar	28	1602:02	20	5	1	51	577	6	.919	1.91
Gibson Homer	14	798:27	9	5	0	36	287	0	.889	2.71
Zach Sandy	1	00:00	0	0	0	0	0	0	.000	0.00
Empty Net	-	20:33	-	-	-	3	-	-	-	-
Total	40	2421:02	29	10	1	151	864	6	.906	2.23

== Awards and honors ==
Player	Award	Ref
Dane Jackson	Herb Brooks Coach of the Year	
Jake Livanavage	AHCA West First Team All-American	
Jake Livanavage	NCHC First Team	
Jan Špunar	NCHC First Team	
Jake Livanavage	NCHC Preseason All-Conference Team	
Cole Reschny	NCHC Rookie of the Year	
Cole Reschny	NCHC Rookie Team	
Jan Špunar	NCHC Rookie Team	
Keaton Verhoeff	NCHC Rookie Team	
Will Zellers	NCHC Rookie Team	
Jan Špunar	NCHC Goaltender of the Year	

== Rankings ==
Ranking movements Legend: ██ Increase in ranking ██ Decrease in ranking т = Tied with team above or below ( ) = First-place votes
	Week																											
Poll	Pre	1	2	3	4	5	6	7	8	9	10	11	12	13	14	15	16	17	18	19	20	21	22	23	24	25	26	Final
USCHO.com	11	10	8	8	8	8	6	6	6	5	4	4	4*	4	4	5	4	4	3	3	3	3	3 (14)	2 (12)	2	2	2*	4
USA Hockey	10т	11	8	8	8	8	6	6	6	6	6	4	4*	4	4	5	4	4	3	3	3	3	2 (7)	2 (10)	2	2	2 (6)	4

Note: USCHO did not release polls in weeks 12 and 26. The previous polls' rankings are listed with an asterisk for these weeks.
Note: USA Hockey did not release a poll in week 12. The previous poll's ranking is listed with an asterisk.

== 2026 NHL entry draft ==
Round	Pick	Player	NHL team
1	6	Carson Carels ^{†}	Calgary Flames
1	9	Keaton Verhoeff	San Jose Sharks
1	22	Liam Ruck ^{†}	Pittsburgh Penguins
2	39	Markus Ruck ^{†}	Pittsburgh Penguins
3	69	Ethan MacKenzie ^{†}	Toronto Maple Leafs
4	117	Brayden Klimpke ^{†}	Montreal Canadiens
5	129	Connor Davis ^{†}	Vancouver Canucks
5	158	Cooper Williams ^{†}	Toronto Maple Leafs

† incoming freshman
