= 2025–26 Omaha Mavericks men's ice hockey season =

- Conference: NCHC
- Home ice: Baxter Arena

Record
- Overall: 12–24–0
- Conference: 8–16–0
- Home: 5–11–0
- Road: 7–13–0

Coaches and captains
- Head coach: Mike Gabinet
- Assistant coaches: Dave Noël-Bernier; Bennett Hambrook
- Captain(s): Šimon Latkoczy; Griffin Ludtke
- Alternate captain(s): Cam Mitchell; Tyler Rollwagen

The 2025–26 Omaha Mavericks men's ice hockey season will be the 29th season of play for the program and 13th in the NCHC. The Mavericks will represent the University of Nebraska Omaha in the 2025–26 NCAA Division I men's ice hockey season, play their home games at Baxter Arena and be coached by Mike Gabinet in his 9th season.

== Departures ==
Player	Position	Nationality	Cause
Brock Bremer	Forward	United States	Graduation (signed with Herlev Eagles)
Noah Ellis	Defenseman	United States	Transferred to Sacred Heart
Aiden Gallacher	Defenseman	United States	Graduation (retired)
Jimmy Glynn	Forward	United States	Graduation (signed with Kansas City Mavericks)
Dylan Gratton	Defenseman	United States	Transferred to Vermont
Harrison Israels	Forward	Canada	Graduation (signed with Florida Everblades)
Nolan Krenzen	Defenseman	United States	Graduation (signed with South Carolina Stingrays)
Tanner Ludtke	Forward	United States	Transferred to Minnesota
Charlie Lurie	Forward	United States	Transferred to Minnesota State
Isaiah Norlin	Defenseman	United States	Transferred to Colgate
Garrett Pinoniemi	Forward	United States	Left program (retired)
Kevin Reidler	Goaltender	Sweden	Transferred to Penn State
Brady Risk	Forward	Canada	Graduation (signed with IF Troja-Ljungby)
Sam Stange	Forward	United States	Graduation
Zach Urdahl	Forward	United States	Graduation (signed with Wilkes-Barre/Scranton Penguins)
Alexi Van Houtte-Cachero	Forward	Canada	Transferred to McGill
Liam Watkins	Forward	Canada	Transferred to Minnesota State

== Recruiting ==
Player	Position	Nationality	Age	Notes
Cameron Briere	Forward	Canada	19	Oakville, ON
Dawson Cowan	Goaltender	Canada	20	Warren, MB
Aidan De La Gorgendiere	Defenseman	Canada	23	Abbotsford, BC; transfer from Alberta
Samuel Huo	Forward	Canada	24	Richmond, BC; transfer from British Columbia
Brett Hyland	Forward	Canada	22	Edmonton, AB; transfer from Alberta; selected 200th overall in 2023
Landon Kosior	Defenseman	Canada	23	Regina, SK; transfer from Saskatchewan
Marc Lajoie	Defenseman	Canada	22	St. Albert, AB; transfer from Alberta
Jérémy Loranger	Forward	Canada	18	Trois-Rivières, QC; selected 198th overall in 2025
Marcus Nguyen	Forward	Canada	21	Calgary, AB
Maxime Pellerin	Forward	Canada	22	Victoriaville, QC; transfer from McGill
Joel Plante	Forward	Canada	20	Langley, BC
Spencer Sova	Defenseman	Canada	21	Windsor, ON
Sean Tschigerl	Forward	Canada	22	Whitecourt, AB; transfer from Alberta; selected 130th overall in 2021
Trevor Wong	Forward	Canada	22	Vancouver, BC; transfer from Saskatchewan
Luke Woodworth	Forward	Canada	21	Bridgewater, NS

== Roster ==
As of August 13, 2025.

No.	Nat.	Player	Class	Pos	Height	Weight	DoB	Hometown	Previous team	NHL rights
1	(Canada)	Will Craig	Junior	G	6' 2" (1.88 m)	229 lb (104 kg)	2002-05-16	Ennismore, Ontario	New Mexico Ice Wolves (NAHL)	—
3	(Canada)	Landon Kosior	Junior	D	6' 0" (1.83 m)	190 lb (86 kg)	2002-08-15	Regina, Saskatchewan	Saskatchewan (CWUAA)	—
5	(United States)	Joe Gramer	Sophomore	D	6' 0" (1.83 m)	196 lb (89 kg)	2005-07-14	Moorhead, Minnesota	Des Moines Buccaneers (USHL)	—
7	(United States)	Griffin Ludtke (C)	Senior	D	5' 10" (1.78 m)	170 lb (77 kg)	2003-02-01	Elko, Minnesota	Sioux City Musketeers (USHL)	—
8	(Sweden)	Marcus Broberg	Sophomore	D	6' 0" (1.83 m)	204 lb (93 kg)	2003-10-23	Örebro, Sweden	Salmon Arm Silverbacks (BCHL)	—
9	(Canada)	Cameron Briere	Freshman	F	5' 10" (1.78 m)	163 lb (74 kg)	2005-11-05	Oakville, Ontario	Chicago Steel (USHL)	—
10	(Canada)	Jacob Guévin	Senior	D	5' 11" (1.8 m)	190 lb (86 kg)	2003-01-17	Drummondville, Quebec	Muskegon Lumberjacks (USHL)	—
11	(Canada)	Samuel Huo	Senior	F	6' 5" (1.96 m)	209 lb (95 kg)	2001-07-13	Richmond, British Columbia	British Columbia (CWUAA)	—
12	(Canada)	Luke Woodworth	Freshman	F	5' 9" (1.75 m)	163 lb (74 kg)	2004-04-01	Bridgewater, Nova Scotia	Drummondville Voltigeurs (QMJHL)	—
13	(Canada)	Jacob Slipec	Senior	F	5' 11" (1.8 m)	187 lb (85 kg)	2001-12-05	White Rock, British Columbia	Surrey Eagles (BCHL)	—
18	(Canada)	Myles Hilman	Sophomore	F	5' 9" (1.75 m)	194 lb (88 kg)	2003-10-15	Blackfalds, Alberta	Waterloo Black Hawks (USHL)	—
19	(Canada)	Sean Tschigerl	Sophomore	F	6' 0" (1.83 m)	190 lb (86 kg)	2003-04-11	Whitecourt, Alberta	Alberta (CWUAA)	ANA, 130th overall 2021
21	(United States)	Tyler Rollwagen (A)	Senior	F	5' 11" (1.8 m)	194 lb (88 kg)	2001-03-20	Bloomington, Minnesota	Fargo Force (USHL)	—
22	(Canada)	Aidan de La Gorgendiere	Sophomore	D	6' 1" (1.85 m)	183 lb (83 kg)	2002-02-22	Abbotsford, British Columbia	Alberta (CWUAA)	—
23	(Canada)	Maxime Pellerin	Sophomore	F	6' 0" (1.83 m)	181 lb (82 kg)	2003-02-18	Victoriaville, Quebec	McGill (OUA)	—
24	(Canada)	Marc Lajoie	Sophomore	D	6' 6" (1.98 m)	223 lb (101 kg)	2003-05-21	St. Albert, Alberta	Alberta (CWUAA)	—
25	(Canada)	Cam Mitchell (A)	Senior	F	5' 9" (1.75 m)	181 lb (82 kg)	2001-03-09	Stony Plain, Alberta	Omaha Lancers (USHL)	—
26	(Canada)	Joel Plante	Freshman	F	5' 11" (1.8 m)	161 lb (73 kg)	2005-06-26	Langley, British Columbia	Portland Winterhawks (WHL)	—
29	(United States)	Chase LaPinta	Sophomore	F	5' 9" (1.75 m)	170 lb (77 kg)	2004-02-10	Frisco, Texas	Sioux Falls Stampede (USHL)	—
30	(Slovakia)	Šimon Latkoczy (C)	Senior	G	5' 11" (1.8 m)	177 lb (80 kg)	2002-06-01	Trenčín, Slovakia	Madison Capitols (USHL)	—
38	(Canada)	Trevor Wong	Sophomore	F	5' 9" (1.75 m)	159 lb (72 kg)	2003-05-04	Vancouver, British Columbia	Saskatchewan (CWUAA)	—
44	(Canada)	Spencer Sova	Freshman	D	6' 1" (1.85 m)	190 lb (86 kg)	2004-01-10	Windsor, Ontario	Brampton Steelheads (OHL)	—
71	(Canada)	Brett Hyland	Sophomore	F	5' 11" (1.8 m)	194 lb (88 kg)	2003-02-18	Edmonton, Alberta	Alberta (CWUAA)	WSH, 200th overall 2023
72	(Canada)	Marcus Nguyen	Freshman	F	5' 10" (1.78 m)	181 lb (82 kg)	2004-08-02	Calgary, Alberta	Brandon Wheat Kings (WHL)	—
73	(Canada)	Dawson Cowan	Freshman	G	6' 2" (1.88 m)	187 lb (85 kg)	2005-09-28	Warren, Manitoba	Spokane Chiefs (WHL)	—
86	(Canada)	Jérémy Loranger	Freshman	F	5' 9" (1.75 m)	161 lb (73 kg)	2007-06-15	Trois-Rivières, Quebec	Sherwood Park Crusaders (BCHL)	CBJ, 198th overall 2025

== Standings ==
2025–26 National Collegiate Hockey Conference Standings
	Conference record										Overall record					
	GP	W	L	T	OTW	OTL	SW	PTS	GF	GA	GP	W	L	T	GF	GA
#4 North Dakota †	24	17	6	1	1	4	0	55	96	58	40	29	10	1	151	90
#1 Denver *	24	17	6	1	2	1	1	52	82	51	43	29	11	3	154	90
#6 Western Michigan	24	16	7	1	3	1	1	48	89	65	39	27	11	1	140	95
#7 Minnesota Duluth	24	11	12	1	3	4	1	36	64	66	40	24	15	1	130	99
St. Cloud State	24	9	14	1	1	2	1	30	63	86	36	16	19	1	112	112
Colorado College	24	7	11	6	2	3	1	29	63	66	36	13	17	6	95	98
Miami	24	9	13	2	3	1	1	28	60	74	36	18	16	2	104	108
Omaha	24	8	16	0	0	0	0	24	57	86	36	12	24	0	95	129
Arizona State	24	7	16	1	2	1	1	22	62	94	36	14	21	1	106	132
Championship: March 21, 2026 † indicates conference regular season champion (Penrose Cup) * indicates conference tournament champion (National Cup); Rankings: USCHO.com Top 20 Poll; updated April 13, 2026

== Schedule and results ==
Date	Time	Opponent^{#}	Rank^{#}	Site	TV	Decision	Result	Attendance	Record
Exhibition
October 3	7:07 pm	Air Force*		Baxter Arena • Omaha, Nebraska (Exhibition)		Dawson	W 3–2 ^{OT}	7,100	
Regular Season
October 10	7:00 pm	#20 Minnesota State*		Baxter Arena • Omaha, Nebraska		Latkoczy	W 6–2	6,385	1–0–0
October 11	7:00 pm	#20 Minnesota State*		Baxter Arena • Omaha, Nebraska		Latkoczy	L 1–4	5,921	1–1–0
October 24	7:00 pm	#13 Massachusetts*		Baxter Arena • Omaha, Nebraska		Latkoczy	L 4–5	6,451	1–2–0
October 25	7:00 pm	#13 Massachusetts*		Baxter Arena • Omaha, Nebraska		Latkoczy	W 5–2	6,148	2–2–0
October 31	8:00 pm	at #15 Colorado College		Ed Robson Arena • Colorado Springs, Colorado	SOCO CW	Latkoczy	W 3–2	3,407	3–2–0 (1–0–0)
November 1	8:00 pm	at #15 Colorado College		Ed Robson Arena • Colorado Springs, Colorado		Cowan	W 5–4	3,532	4–2–0 (2–0–0)
November 7	7:00 pm	#8 North Dakota		Baxter Arena • Omaha, Nebraska		Latkoczy	L 2–7	7,169	4–3–0 (2–1–0)
November 8	7:00 pm	#8 North Dakota		Baxter Arena • Omaha, Nebraska		Latkoczy	L 1–4	6,859	4–4–0 (2–2–0)
November 14	7:07 pm	at #3 Minnesota Duluth		AMSOIL Arena • Duluth, Minnesota	My9	Latkoczy	L 2–5	5,239	4–5–0 (2–3–0)
November 15	6:07 pm	at #3 Minnesota Duluth		AMSOIL Arena • Duluth, Minnesota	My9	Cowan	W 2–0	5,349	5–5–0 (3–3–0)
November 21	7:00 pm	#8 Western Michigan		Baxter Arena • Omaha, Nebraska		Latkoczy	L 2–7	6,237	5–6–0 (3–4–0)
November 22	7:00 pm	#8 Western Michigan		Baxter Arena • Omaha, Nebraska		Cowan	L 2–4	6,076	5–7–0 (3–5–0)
November 28	6:00 pm	at Yale*		Ingalls Rink • New Haven, Connecticut	ESPN+	Latkoczy	L 1–2	1,267	5–8–0
November 29	6:00 pm	at Yale*		Ingalls Rink • New Haven, Connecticut	ESPN+	Latkoczy	W 3–1	1,120	6–8–0
December 12	7:07 pm	at #4 North Dakota		Ralph Engelstad Arena • Grand Forks, North Dakota	Midco Sports	Cowan	L 1–4	11,284	6–9–0 (3–6–0)
December 13	6:07 pm	at #4 North Dakota		Ralph Engelstad Arena • Grand Forks, North Dakota	Midco Sports	Cowan	L 1–3	11,443	6–10–0 (3–7–0)
December 19	7:07 pm	at Augustana*		Midco Arena • Sioux Falls, South Dakota	Midco Sports+	Cowan	L 4–7	2,542	6–11–0
December 20	6:07 pm	at Augustana*		Midco Arena • Sioux Falls, South Dakota	Midco Sports+	Cowan	W 4–1	2,925	7–11–0
December 30	7:00 pm	Manitoba*		Baxter Arena • Omaha, Nebraska (Exhibition)		Cowan	W 4–1	7,613	
January 2	6:00 pm	at #17 Cornell*		Lynah Rink • Ithaca, New York	ESPN+	Cowan	L 4–6	1,982	7–12–0
January 3	6:00 pm	at #17 Cornell*		Lynah Rink • Ithaca, New York	ESPN+	Cowan	L 2–3	1,982	7–13–0
January 9	7:00 pm	St. Cloud State		Baxter Arena • Omaha, Nebraska		Cowan	W 6–2	6,391	8–13–0 (4–7–0)
January 10	7:00 pm	St. Cloud State		Baxter Arena • Omaha, Nebraska		Cowan	L 1–2	6,814	8–14–0 (4–8–0)
January 16	6:05 pm	at Miami		Steve Cady Arena • Oxford, Ohio	RESN	Latkoczy	L 0–3	2,083	8–15–0 (4–9–0)
January 17	5:05 pm	at Miami		Steve Cady Arena • Oxford, Ohio	RESN	Cowan	L 2–6	2,407	8–16–0 (4–10–0)
January 23	7:00 pm	Colorado College		Baxter Arena • Omaha, Nebraska		Latkoczy	W 3–1	5,990	9–16–0 (5–10–0)
January 24	7:00 pm	Colorado College		Baxter Arena • Omaha, Nebraska		Latkoczy	L 1–3	6,705	9–17–0 (5–11–0)
January 30	6:00 pm	at #3 Western Michigan		Lawson Arena • Kalamazoo, Michigan		Latkoczy	L 2–5	3,633	9–18–0 (5–12–0)
January 31	5:00 pm	at #3 Western Michigan		Lawson Arena • Kalamazoo, Michigan		Latkoczy	W 4–1	3,946	10–18–0 (6–12–0)
February 13	7:00 pm	#8 Denver		Baxter Arena • Omaha, Nebraska		Latkoczy	L 2–5	6,292	10–19–0 (6–13–0)
February 14	7:00 pm	#8 Denver		Baxter Arena • Omaha, Nebraska		Latkoczy	L 1–3	6,731	10–20–0 (6–14–0)
February 20	8:00 pm	at Arizona State		Mullett Arena • Tempe, Arizona		Latkoczy	W 4–2	4,987	11–20–0 (7–14–0)
February 21	6:00 pm	at Arizona State		Mullett Arena • Tempe, Arizona		Latkoczy	L 3–6	5,027	11–21–0 (7–15–0)
February 27	7:00 pm	Miami		Baxter Arena • Omaha, Nebraska		Latkoczy	W 5–3	7,194	12–21–0 (8–15–0)
February 28	7:00 pm	Miami		Baxter Arena • Omaha, Nebraska		Latkoczy	L 2–3	7,627	12–22–0 (8–16–0)
NCHC Tournament
March 6	7:07 pm	at #3 North Dakota*		Ralph Engelstad Arena • Grand Forks, North Dakota (NCHC Quarterfinal Game 1)	Midco Sports	Latkoczy	L 3–5	11,400	12–23–0
March 7	6:07 pm	at #3 North Dakota*		Ralph Engelstad Arena • Grand Forks, North Dakota (NCHC Quarterfinal Game 2)	Midco Sports	Latkoczy	L 1–5	11,569	12–24–0
*Non-conference game. ^{#}Rankings from USCHO.com Poll. All times are in Central Time. Source:

== Rankings ==
Poll	Week																											
Poll	Pre	1	2	3	4	5	6	7	8	9	10	11	12	13	14	15	16	17	18	19	20	21	22	23	24	25	26	27 (Final)
USCHO.com	RV	RV	RV	NR	RV	RV	RV	RV	RV	NR	NR	NR	–	NR	NR	NR	NR	NR	NR	NR	NR	NR	NR	NR	NR			
USA Hockey	RV	RV	RV	NR	RV	RV	RV	RV	NR	NR	NR	NR	–	NR	NR	NR	NR	NR	NR	NR	NR	NR	NR	NR	NR			

Note: USCHO did not release a poll in week 12.
Note: USA Hockey did not release a poll in week 12.
