= 2025–26 St. Cloud State Huskies men's ice hockey season =

Coachella Valley Cactus Cup, Champion
- Conference: NCHC
- Home ice: Herb Brooks National Hockey Center

Record
- Overall: 16–19–1
- Conference: 9–14–1
- Home: 8–10–0
- Road: 6–9–1
- Neutral: 2–0–0

Coaches and captains
- Head coach: Brett Larson
- Assistant coaches: R. J. Enga; Clark Kuster; Eric Rud

The 2025–26 St. Cloud State Huskies men's ice hockey season will be the 91st season of play for the program, the 29th at the Division I level and 13th in the NCHC. The Huskies will represent St. Cloud State University in the 2025–26 NCAA Division I men's ice hockey season, play their home games at Herb Brooks National Hockey Center and be coached by Brett Larson in his 8th season.

== Departures ==
Player	Position	Nationality	Cause
Warren Clark	Defenseman	Canada	Transferred to Northern Michigan
Gavin Enright	Goaltender	United States	Graduation (retired)
Karl Falk	Defenseman	Sweden	Graduation (signed with Lillehammer IK)
Josh Luedtke	Defenseman	United States	Graduation (signed with Savannah Ghost Pirates)
Nick Portz	Forward	United States	Graduation (retired)
Isak Posch	Goaltender	Sweden	Signed professional contract (Colorado Avalanche)
Colin Ralph	Defenseman	United States	Transferred to Michigan State
Mason Salquist	Forward	United States	Graduation (signed with Wheeling Nailers)
Kaleb Tiessen	Defenseman	Canada	Signed professional contract mid-season (Rapid City Rush)

== Recruiting ==
Player	Position	Nationality	Age	Notes
Joe Belisle	Defenseman	United States	20	Hugo, MN
Patriks Bērziņš	Goaltender	Latvia	22	Talsi, LAT; transfer from Maine
Tanner Henricks	Defenseman	United States	19	Mission Viejo, CA; selected 101st overall in 2024
Finn Loftus	Defenseman	United States	21	Blaine, MN; transfer from Massachusetts
Nolan Roed	Forward	United States	19	White Bear Lake, MN; selected 214th overall in 2025
Yan Shostak	Goaltender	Belarus	21	Minsk, BLR
Max Smolinski	Defenseman	United States	22	Bloomfield Hills, MI; transfer from Rensselaer
Noah Urness	Forward	United States	19	Roseau, MN
Aiden Welch	Forward	United States	21	White Bear Lake, MN

== Roster ==
As of August 13, 2025.

No.	Nat.	Player	Class	Pos	Height	Weight	DoB	Hometown	Previous team	NHL rights
1	(Belarus)	Yan Shostak	Freshman	G	6' 0" (1.83 m)	185 lb (84 kg)	2004-05-30	Minsk, Belarus	Lincoln Stars (USHL)	—
3	(United States)	Joe Belisle	Freshman	D	6' 0" (1.83 m)	176 lb (80 kg)	2005-06-06	Hugo, Minnesota	Sioux Falls Stampede (USHL)	—
4	(United States)	Finn Loftus	Sophomore	D	6' 1" (1.85 m)	179 lb (81 kg)	2004-02-12	Blaine, Minnesota	Massachusetts (HEA)	—
5	(United States)	Tanner Henricks	Freshman	D	6' 4" (1.93 m)	205 lb (93 kg)	2006-06-25	Mission Viejo, California	Lincoln Stars (USHL)	CBJ, 101st overall 2024
6	(United States)	Mason Reiners	Senior	D	6' 1" (1.85 m)	195 lb (88 kg)	2001-05-03	Edina, Minnesota	Waterloo Black Hawks (USHL)	—
7	(United States)	Jack Reimann	Junior	F	6' 0" (1.83 m)	195 lb (88 kg)	2002-10-10	Ham Lake, Minnesota	Des Moines Buccaneers (USHL)	—
8	(United States)	Ocean Wallace	Sophomore	F	6' 3" (1.91 m)	216 lb (98 kg)	2003-10-31	Boulder, Colorado	Austin Bruins (NAHL)	—
10	(United States)	Noah Urness	Freshman	F	5' 10" (1.78 m)	181 lb (82 kg)	2005-12-01	Roseau, Minnesota	Sioux Falls Stampede (USHL)	—
11	(United States)	Grant Ahcan	Senior	F	5' 10" (1.78 m)	160 lb (73 kg)	2002-05-18	Savage, Minnesota	Cedar Rapids RoughRiders (USHL)	—
12	(Canada)	Ryan Rosborough	Senior (RS)	F	6' 3" (1.91 m)	190 lb (86 kg)	2000-05-24	Mt. Brydges, Ontario	South Shore Kings (NCDC)	—
13	(Canada)	Tyson Gross	Junior	F	6' 3" (1.91 m)	185 lb (84 kg)	2002-09-23	Calgary, Alberta	Cedar Rapids RoughRiders (USHL)	—
14	(Canada)	Josh Zinger	Senior	D	5' 11" (1.8 m)	185 lb (84 kg)	2001-08-05	Red Deer, Alberta	Northern Michigan (CCHA)	—
15	(United States)	Barrett Hall	Junior	F	6' 0" (1.83 m)	170 lb (77 kg)	2003-12-29	Apple Valley, Minnesota	Green Bay Gamblers (USHL)	SEA, 164th overall 2022
17	(Canada)	Ethan AuCoin	Senior	F	6' 1" (1.85 m)	170 lb (77 kg)	2002-08-10	Calgary, Alberta	Lloydminster Bobcats (AJHL)	—
18	(United States)	Aiden Welch	Freshman	F	6' 2" (1.88 m)	207 lb (94 kg)	2004-05-27	White Bear Lake, Minnesota	Sioux Falls Stampede (USHL)	—
19	(Finland)	Verner Miettinen	Junior	F	5' 11" (1.8 m)	172 lb (78 kg)	2003-04-07	Espoo, Finland	Fargo Force (USHL)	—
20	(United States)	Jack Rogers	Senior	F	6' 1" (1.85 m)	190 lb (86 kg)	2002-09-23	East Northport, New York	Steinbach Pistons (MJHL)	—
21	(United States)	Max Smolinski	Senior	F	5' 11" (1.8 m)	180 lb (82 kg)	2003-04-02	Bloomfield Hills, Michigan	Rensselaer (ECAC)	—
22	(United States)	Nolan Roed	Freshman	F	5' 11" (1.8 m)	185 lb (84 kg)	2005-10-25	White Bear Lake, Minnesota	Tri-City Storm (USHL)	COL, 214th overall 2025
23	(United States)	Austin Burnevik	Sophomore	F	6' 4" (1.93 m)	201 lb (91 kg)	2005-01-03	Ham Lake, Minnesota	Madison Capitols (USHL)	ANA, 182nd overall 2024
25	(United States)	Thor Byfuglien	Junior	D	5' 11" (1.8 m)	174 lb (79 kg)	2003-07-14	Roseau, Minnesota	Chicago Steel (USHL)	—
26	(United States)	Cooper Wylie	Senior	D	6' 1" (1.85 m)	195 lb (88 kg)	2001-10-26	Stillwater, Minnesota	Waterloo Black Hawks (USHL)	—
27	(Canada)	Kaleb Tiessen	Junior	D	6' 5" (1.96 m)	210 lb (95 kg)	2002-06-03	Leamington, Ontario	Maryland Black Bears (NAHL)	—
28	(United States)	Gavyn Thoreson	Sophomore	F	5' 8" (1.73 m)	179 lb (81 kg)	2004-10-30	Andover, Minnesota	Waterloo Black Hawks (USHL)	—
33	(Canada)	James Gray	Junior (RS)	G	6' 3" (1.91 m)	195 lb (88 kg)	2002-05-24	Toronto, Ontario	North York Rangers (OJHL)	—
34	(Canada)	Adam Ingram	Senior	F	6' 1" (1.85 m)	175 lb (79 kg)	2003-10-14	West St. Paul, Manitoba	Youngstown Phantoms (USHL)	NSH, 82nd overall 2022
39	(Latvia)	Patriks Bērziņš	Sophomore	G	6' 1" (1.85 m)	185 lb (84 kg)	2003-08-30	Talsi, Latvia	Maine (HEA)	—
81	(Canada)	Daimon Gardner	Junior	F	6' 5" (1.96 m)	205 lb (93 kg)	2004-01-18	Eagle Lake, Ontario	Clarkson (ECAC)	VAN, 112th overall 2022

== Standings ==
2025–26 National Collegiate Hockey Conference Standings
	Conference record										Overall record					
	GP	W	L	T	OTW	OTL	SW	PTS	GF	GA	GP	W	L	T	GF	GA
#2 North Dakota †	24	17	6	1	1	4	0	55	96	58	39	29	9	1	150	88
#4 Denver *	24	17	6	1	2	1	1	52	82	51	41	27	11	3	148	86
#5 Western Michigan	24	16	7	1	3	1	1	48	89	65	39	27	11	1	140	95
#6 Minnesota Duluth	24	11	12	1	3	4	1	36	64	66	40	24	15	1	130	99
St. Cloud State	24	9	14	1	1	2	1	30	63	86	36	16	19	1	112	112
Colorado College	24	7	11	6	2	3	1	29	63	66	36	13	17	6	95	98
Miami	24	9	13	2	3	1	1	28	60	74	36	18	16	2	104	108
Omaha	24	8	16	0	0	0	0	24	57	86	36	12	24	0	95	129
Arizona State	24	7	16	1	2	1	1	22	62	94	36	14	21	1	106	132
Championship: March 21, 2026 † indicates conference regular season champion (Penrose Cup) * indicates conference tournament champion (National Cup); Rankings: USCHO.com Top 20 Poll; updated March 30, 2026

== Schedule and results ==
Date	Time	Opponent^{#}	Rank^{#}	Site	TV	Decision	Result	Attendance	Record
Exhibition
October 3	6:00 pm	Augustana*		Herb Brooks National Hockey Center • St. Cloud, Minnesota (Exhibition)	The CW		T 2–2		
Regular Season
October 4	6:00 pm	#19 St. Thomas*		Herb Brooks National Hockey Center • St. Cloud, Minnesota	The CW	Shostak	L 3–4	3,529	0–1–0
October 10	7:00 pm	at Bemidji State*		Sanford Center • Bemidji, Minnesota	Midco Sports+	Shostak	W 3–2	2,456	1–1–0
October 11	6:00 pm	Bemidji State*		Herb Brooks National Hockey Center • St. Cloud, Minnesota	The CW	Bērziņš	W 4–2	3,345	2–1–0
October 17	7:00 pm	Vermont*		Herb Brooks National Hockey Center • St. Cloud, Minnesota	The CW	Shostak	L 1–2 ^{OT}	3,002	2–2–0
October 18	6:00 pm	Vermont*		Herb Brooks National Hockey Center • St. Cloud, Minnesota	The CW	Shostak	W 4–0	3,178	3–2–0
October 24	7:00 pm	Alaska Anchorage*		Herb Brooks National Hockey Center • St. Cloud, Minnesota	The CW	Shostak	W 5–2	3,014	4–2–0
October 25	6:00 pm	Alaska Anchorage*		Herb Brooks National Hockey Center • St. Cloud, Minnesota	The CW	Bērziņš	W 5–1	4,126	5–2–0
October 31	7:00 pm	#3 Western Michigan		Herb Brooks National Hockey Center • St. Cloud, Minnesota	The CW	Shostak	L 5–6	3,068	5–3–0 (0–1–0)
November 1	6:00 pm	#3 Western Michigan		Herb Brooks National Hockey Center • St. Cloud, Minnesota	The CW	Bērziņš	W 5–1	3,489	6–3–0 (1–1–0)
November 7	7:00 pm	at #7 Minnesota Duluth		AMSOIL Arena • Duluth, Minnesota	My9	Bērziņš	L 0–4	5,385	6–4–0 (1–2–0)
November 8	6:00 pm	at #7 Minnesota Duluth		AMSOIL Arena • Duluth, Minnesota	My9	Shostak	L 2–3 ^{OT}	5,589	6–5–0 (1–3–0)
November 11	7:00 pm	at St. Thomas		Lee & Penny Anderson Arena • Saint Paul, Minnesota	Midco Sports+	Bērziņš	L 1–3	3,272	6–6–0
November 21	6:00 pm	at Miami		Steve Cady Arena • Oxford, Ohio	RESN	Shostak	L 5–6 ^{OT}	3,642	6–7–0 (1–4–0)
November 22	5:00 pm	at Miami		Steve Cady Arena • Oxford, Ohio	RESN	Bērziņš	W 4–2	2,809	7–7–0 (2–4–0)
December 5	7:00 pm	#5 North Dakota		Herb Brooks National Hockey Center • St. Cloud, Minnesota	The CW	Bērziņš	L 3–4	3,454	7–8–0 (2–5–0)
December 6	6:00 pm	#5 North Dakota		Herb Brooks National Hockey Center • St. Cloud, Minnesota	The CW	Shostak	L 2–4	4,622	7–9–0 (2–6–0)
December 12	7:00 pm	#6 Denver		Herb Brooks National Hockey Center • St. Cloud, Minnesota	The CW	Shostak	L 1–5	3,024	7–10–0 (2–7–0)
December 13	6:00 pm	#6 Denver		Herb Brooks National Hockey Center • St. Cloud, Minnesota	The CW	Bērziņš	W 4–3	3,608	8–10–0 (3–7–0)
Coachella Valley Cactus Cup
January 2	9:00 pm	vs. Yale*		Acrisure Arena • Thousand Palms, California (Cactus Cup Semifinal)		Bērziņš	W 6–2	—	9–10–0
January 3	9:00 pm	vs. Massachusetts Lowell*		Acrisure Arena • Thousand Palms, California (Cactus Cup Championship)		Bērziņš	W 3–2	—	10–10–0
January 9	7:00 pm	at Omaha		Baxter Arena • Omaha, Nebraska		Bērziņš	L 2–6	6,391	10–11–0 (3–8–0)
January 10	7:00 pm	at Omaha		Baxter Arena • Omaha, Nebraska		Shostak	W 2–1	6,814	11–11–0 (4–8–0)
January 16	7:00 pm	#6 Minnesota Duluth		Herb Brooks National Hockey Center • St. Cloud, Minnesota	My9, The CW	Shostak	W 6–0	3,598	12–11–0 (5–8–0)
January 17	6:00 pm	#6 Minnesota Duluth		Herb Brooks National Hockey Center • St. Cloud, Minnesota	My9, The CW	Shostak	L 3–5	4,566	12–12–0 (5–9–0)
January 23	8:00 pm	at #9 Denver		Magness Arena • Denver, Colorado		Shostak	W 4–2	6,328	13–12–0 (6–9–0)
January 24	7:00 pm	at #9 Denver		Magness Arena • Denver, Colorado		Bērziņš	L 0–6	6,328	13–13–0 (6–10–0)
January 30	7:00 pm	Miami	#20	Herb Brooks National Hockey Center • St. Cloud, Minnesota	The CW	Bērziņš	L 1–2	3,257	13–14–0 (6–11–0)
January 31	6:00 pm	Miami	#20	Herb Brooks National Hockey Center • St. Cloud, Minnesota	The CW	Shostak	L 1–3	3,469	13–15–0 (6–12–0)
February 6	8:00 pm	at Arizona State		Mullett Arena • Tempe, Arizona		Bērziņš	W 4–1	5,126	14–15–0 (7–12–0)
February 7	6:00 pm	at Arizona State		Mullett Arena • Tempe, Arizona		Bērziņš	W 4–3	5,047	15–15–0 (8–12–0)
February 13	7:00 pm	Colorado College		Herb Brooks National Hockey Center • St. Cloud, Minnesota	SOCO CW, The CW	Bērziņš	W 6–5 ^{OT}	3,566	16–15–0 (9–12–0)
February 14	6:00 pm	Colorado College		Herb Brooks National Hockey Center • St. Cloud, Minnesota	The CW	Shostak	L 1–4	4,183	16–16–0 (9–13–0)
February 20	7:00 pm	at #3 North Dakota		Ralph Engelstad Arena • Grand Forks, North Dakota	Midco Sports	Shostak	T 4–4 ^{SOW}	11,647	16–16–1 (9–13–1)
February 21	6:00 pm	at #3 North Dakota		Ralph Engelstad Arena • Grand Forks, North Dakota	Midco Sports, TSN2	Bērziņš	L 4–6	11,696	16–17–1 (9–14–1)
NCHC Tournament
March 6	7:07 pm	at #10 Minnesota Duluth*		AMSOIL Arena • Duluth, Minnesota (NCHC Quarterfinal Game 1)	My9	Shostak	L 3–4	4,238	16–18–1
March 7	6:07 pm	at #10 Minnesota Duluth*		AMSOIL Arena • Duluth, Minnesota (NCHC Quarterfinal Game 2)	My9	Shostak	L 1–2	4,251	16–19–1
*Non-conference game. ^{#}Rankings from USCHO.com Poll. All times are in Central Time. Source:

== Rankings ==
Ranking movements Legend: ██ Increase in ranking ██ Decrease in ranking — = Not ranked RV = Received votes
	Week																											
Poll	Pre	1	2	3	4	5	6	7	8	9	10	11	12	13	14	15	16	17	18	19	20	21	22	23	24	25	26	Final
USCHO.com	RV	RV	RV	RV	RV	RV	RV	RV	RV	RV	RV	RV	*	RV	RV	RV	RV	20	—	RV	RV	RV	RV	—	RV			
USA Hockey	RV	RV	RV	RV	RV	RV	RV	RV	RV	RV	—	—	*	—	—	RV	RV	19	—	RV	RV	RV	—	RV	—			

Note: USCHO did not release a week 12 poll.
Note: USA Hockey did not release a week 12 poll.
