= 2025–26 Denver Pioneers men's ice hockey season =

Collegiate team season

NCAA Division I National Champion NCHC Tournament, Champion NCAA Tournament, Champion
- Conference: NCHC
- Home ice: Magness Arena

Rankings
- USCHO: #4
- USA Hockey: #4

Record
- Overall: 29–11–3
- Conference: 17–6–1
- Home: 14–6–1
- Road: 11–4–2
- Neutral: 4–1–0

Coaches and captains
- Head coach: David Carle
- Assistant coaches: Tavis MacMillan; Dallas Ferguson; Ryan Massa

The 2025–26 Denver Pioneers men's ice hockey season is the 77th total for the program, and the 13th as a member of the National Collegiate Hockey Conference (NCHC). The Pioneers represent the University of Denver in the 2025–26 NCAA Division I men's ice hockey season. The team plays home games at Magness Arena in Denver, Colorado and are led by eighth-year head coach David Carle.

== Departures ==
Player	Position	Nationality	Cause
Zeev Buium	Defenseman	United States	Signed professional contract (Minnesota Wild)
Connor Caponi	Forward	United States	Graduation (signed with Cardiff Devils)
Matt Davis	Goaltender	Canada	Graduation (signed with San Jose Barracuda)
Jack Devine	Forward	United States	Graduation (signed with Florida Panthers)
Freddie Halyk	Goaltender	Canada	Transferred to Brown
Carter King	Forward	Canada	Graduation (signed with Calgary Flames)
Aidan Thompson	Forward	United States	Signed professional contract (Chicago Blackhawks)
Jared Wright	Forward	United States	Signed professional contract (Los Angeles Kings)

== Recruiting ==
Player	Position	Nationality	Age	Notes
Clarke Caswell	Forward	Canada	19	Brandon, MB; selected 141st overall in 2024
Kyle Chyzowski	Forward	Canada	21	Surrey, BC
Kristian Epperson	Forward	United States	19	Mequon, WI; selected 88th overall in 2025
Johnny Hicks	Goaltender	Canada	20	Kamloops, BC
Eric Jamieson	Defenseman	Canada	20	Calgary, AB; selected 177th overall in 2024
Brendan McMorrow	Forward	United States	19	Lakeville, MN; selected 196th overall in 2025
Brady Milburn	Forward	Canada	20	Kamloops, BC
Quentin Miller	Goaltender	Canada	20	Montréal, QC; selected 128th overall in 2023
Payton Nelson	Forward	United States	20	Centennial, CO
Reid Varkonyi	Forward	Canada	19	Sherwood Park, AB

== Roster ==
As of August 12, 2025.

No.	Nat.	Player	Class	Pos	Height	Weight	DoB	Hometown	Previous team	NHL rights
2	(United States)	Tory Pitner	Sophomore	D	6' 1" (1.85 m)	183 lb (83 kg)	2006-03-06	Greenwich, Connecticut	Youngstown Phantoms (USHL)	COL, 185th overall 2024
3	(Canada)	Cale Ashcroft	Junior	D	5' 11" (1.8 m)	190 lb (86 kg)	2004-08-05	St. Albert, Alberta	Tri-City Storm (USHL)	—
5	(United States)	Garrett Brown	Junior	D	6' 3" (1.91 m)	200 lb (91 kg)	2004-04-04	San Jose, California	Waterloo Black Hawks (USHL)	WPG, 99th overall 2022
6	(United States)	Alec Whipple	Sophomore	D	6' 0" (1.83 m)	181 lb (82 kg)	2004-02-09	Far Hills, New Jersey	Trail Smoke Eaters (BCHL)	—
8	(United States)	Kristian Epperson	Freshman	F	6' 0" (1.83 m)	185 lb (84 kg)	2006-05-16	Mequon, Wisconsin	Saginaw Spirit (OHL)	LAK, 88th overall 2025
9	(Canada)	Boston Buckberger	Junior	D	5' 11" (1.8 m)	180 lb (82 kg)	2003-06-01	Saskatoon, Saskatchewan	Lincoln Stars (USHL)	—
10	(Canada)	Brady Milburn	Freshman	F	6' 1" (1.85 m)	194 lb (88 kg)	2005-03-03	Kamloops, British Columbia	Kamloops (BCHL)	—
11	(Finland)	Samu Salminen	Senior	F	6' 2" (1.88 m)	182 lb (83 kg)	2003-04-09	Helsinki, Finland	Connecticut (HEA)	NJD, 68th overall 2021
12	(United States)	Sam Harris	Junior	F	6' 1" (1.85 m)	190 lb (86 kg)	2003-10-14	San Diego, California	Sioux Falls Stampede (USHL)	MTL, 133rd overall 2023
13	(United States)	Hagen Burrows	Sophomore	F	6' 3" (1.91 m)	176 lb (80 kg)	2005-10-13	Orono, Minnesota	Sioux City Musketeers (USHL)	TBL, 128th overall 2024
14	(Canada)	Rieger Lorenz	Senior	F	6' 2" (1.88 m)	192 lb (87 kg)	2004-03-30	Calgary, Alberta	Okotoks Oilers (AJHL)	MIN, 56th overall 2022
15	(Canada)	Eric Jamieson	Freshman	D	6' 3" (1.91 m)	205 lb (93 kg)	2005-07-15	Calgary, Alberta	Everett Silvertips (WHL)	CGY, 177th overall 2024
16	(Canada)	Kyle Chyzowski	Freshman	F	5' 10" (1.78 m)	170 lb (77 kg)	2004-08-16	Surrey, British Columbia	Portland Winterhawks (WHL)	—
17	(United States)	Peter LaJoy	Junior	F	5' 7" (1.7 m)	165 lb (75 kg)	2002-02-27	Evergreen, Colorado	Danbury Jr. Hat Tricks (NAHL)	—
18	(United States)	Payton Nelson	Freshman	F	5' 11" (1.8 m)	174 lb (79 kg)	2005-01-17	Centennial, Colorado	Salmon Arm Silverbacks (BCHL)	—
19	(United States)	Jake Fisher	Sophomore	F	6' 2" (1.88 m)	192 lb (87 kg)	2005-03-27	Woodbury, Minnesota	Fargo Force (USHL)	COL, 121st overall 2024
21	(Canada)	Kent Anderson	Senior	D	6' 3" (1.91 m)	205 lb (93 kg)	2003-11-13	Calgary, Alberta	Green Bay Gamblers (USHL)	—
22	(United States)	Brendan McMorrow	Freshman	F	6' 0" (1.83 m)	190 lb (86 kg)	2006-03-27	Lakeville, Minnesota	Waterloo Black Hawks (USHL)	LAK, 196th overall 2025
23	(United States)	Eric Pohlkamp	Junior	D	5' 11" (1.8 m)	205 lb (93 kg)	2004-03-23	Brainerd, Minnesota	Bemidji State (USHL)	SJS, 132nd overall 2023
24	(United States)	Kieran Cebrian	Junior	F	6' 2" (1.88 m)	195 lb (88 kg)	2003-03-31	Denver, Colorado	Tri-City Storm (USHL)	—
25	(Canada)	Clarke Caswell	Freshman	F	5' 11" (1.8 m)	181 lb (82 kg)	2006-02-02	Brandon, Manitoba	Swift Current Broncos (WHL)	SEA, 141st overall 2024
27	(United States)	James Reeder	Freshman	F	5' 10" (1.78 m)	168 lb (76 kg)	2005-10-06	Glenview, Illinois	Dubuque Fighting Saints (USHL)	LAK, 198th overall 2024
28	(Canada)	Reid Varkonyi	Freshman	F	5' 10" (1.78 m)	183 lb (83 kg)	2006-01-15	Sherwood Park, Alberta	Sioux Falls Stampede (USHL)	—
29	(Canada)	Quentin Miller	Freshman	G	6' 3" (1.91 m)	187 lb (85 kg)	2004-12-23	Montréal, Quebec	Chilliwack Chiefs (BCHL)	MTL, 128th overall 2023
30	(Canada)	Paxton Geisel	Junior	G	6' 1" (1.85 m)	190 lb (86 kg)	2004-01-18	Estevan, Saskatchewan	Muskegon Lumberjacks (USHL)	—
31	(Canada)	Johnny Hicks	Freshman	G	5' 11" (1.8 m)	154 lb (70 kg)	2005-09-11	Kamloops, British Columbia	Victoria Royals (WHL)	—

== Standings ==
2025–26 National Collegiate Hockey Conference Standings
	Conference record										Overall record					
	GP	W	L	T	OTW	OTL	SW	PTS	GF	GA	GP	W	L	T	GF	GA
#4 North Dakota †	24	17	6	1	1	4	0	55	96	58	40	29	10	1	151	90
#1 Denver *	24	17	6	1	2	1	1	52	82	51	43	29	11	3	154	90
#6 Western Michigan	24	16	7	1	3	1	1	48	89	65	39	27	11	1	140	95
#7 Minnesota Duluth	24	11	12	1	3	4	1	36	64	66	40	24	15	1	130	99
St. Cloud State	24	9	14	1	1	2	1	30	63	86	36	16	19	1	112	112
Colorado College	24	7	11	6	2	3	1	29	63	66	36	13	17	6	95	98
Miami	24	9	13	2	3	1	1	28	60	74	36	18	16	2	104	108
Omaha	24	8	16	0	0	0	0	24	57	86	36	12	24	0	95	129
Arizona State	24	7	16	1	2	1	1	22	62	94	36	14	21	1	106	132
Championship: March 21, 2026 † indicates conference regular season champion (Penrose Cup) * indicates conference tournament champion (National Cup); Rankings: USCHO.com Top 20 Poll; updated April 13, 2026

== Schedule and results ==
Date	Time	Opponent^{#}	Rank^{#}	Site	TV	Decision	Result	Attendance	Record
Exhibition
October 3	6:00 pm	UNLV*	#4	Magness Arena • Denver, Colorado (Exhibition)		Miller	W 6–1	6,044	
Regular season
October 10	7:00 pm	at Air Force*	#5	Cadet Ice Arena • Air Force Academy, Colorado	FloHockey	Miller	T 1–1 ^{SOW}	2,560	0–0–1
October 11	7:00 pm	Bentley*	#5	Magness Arena • Denver, Colorado		Geisel	W 6–0	6,380	1–0–1
October 17	6:10 pm	at Lindenwood*	#5	Centene Community Ice Center • Maryland Heights, Missouri		Geisel	L 3–4	1,888	1–1–1
October 18	6:10 pm	at Lindenwood*	#5	Centene Community Ice Center • Maryland Heights, Missouri		Miller	W 4–0	2,079	2–1–1
October 24	7:00 pm	at #9 Boston College*	#7	Conte Forum • Chestnut Hill, Massachusetts	ESPN+	Miller	W 7–3	7,884	3–1–1
October 25	5:00 pm	at Northeastern*	#7	Matthews Arena • Boston, Massachusetts	ESPN+	Miller	L 0–1	4,499	3–2–1
October 31	7:00 pm	Alaska Anchorage*	#6	Magness Arena • Denver, Colorado	Altitude	Miller	L 3–4 ^{OT}	5,031	3–3–1
November 1	6:00 pm	Alaska Anchorage*	#6	Magness Arena • Denver, Colorado		Miller	W 6–0	6,235	4–3–1
November 7	5:00 pm	at #4 Western Michigan	#9	Lawson Arena • Kalamazoo, Michigan		Miller	W 3–1	3,670	5–3–1 (1–0–0)
November 8	4:00 pm	at #4 Western Michigan	#9	Lawson Arena • Kalamazoo, Michigan		Miller	W 6–3	3,825	6–3–1 (2–0–0)
November 14	7:00 pm	#17 Colorado College	#4	Magness Arena • Denver, Colorado (Rivalry)	Altitude	Miller	W 2–1 ^{OT}	7,073	7–3–1 (3–0–0)
November 15	5:00 pm	at #17 Colorado College	#4	Ed Robson Arena • Colorado Springs, Colorado (Rivalry)		Miller	W 3–2	3,532	8–3–1 (4–0–0)
November 21	5:00 pm	at Arizona State	#3	Mullett Arena • Tempe, Arizona	Fox 10 Xtra	Miller	W 7–1	5,002	9–3–1 (5–0–0)
November 22	5:00 pm	at Arizona State	#3	Mullett Arena • Tempe, Arizona	Fox 10 Xtra	Miller	L 2–3 ^{OT}	4,896	9–4–1 (5–1–0)
November 29	7:00 pm	vs. Minnesota*	#4	Ball Arena • Denver, Colorado (US Hockey Hall of Fame Game)	Fox9+	Miller	L 5–6 ^{OT}	12,228	9–5–1
December 5	7:00 pm	#19 Miami	#6	Magness Arena • Denver, Colorado		Miller	W 4–0	6,223	10–5–1 (6–1–0)
December 6	6:00 pm	#19 Miami	#6	Magness Arena • Denver, Colorado		Miller	W 5–2	6,172	11–5–1 (7–1–0)
December 12	6:00 pm	at St. Cloud State	#6	Herb Brooks National Hockey Center • St. Cloud, Minnesota	The CW	Miller	W 5–1	3,024	12–5–1 (8–1–0)
December 13	5:00 pm	at St. Cloud State	#6	Herb Brooks National Hockey Center • St. Cloud, Minnesota	The CW	Miller	L 3–4	3,608	12–6–1 (8–2–0)
January 2	7:00 pm	#15 Maine*	#6	Magness Arena • Denver, Colorado		Miller	L 2–5	6,329	12–7–1
January 3	6:00 pm	#15 Maine*	#6	Magness Arena • Denver, Colorado		Miller	T 3–3 ^{OT}	6,556	12–7–2
January 9	7:00 pm	#6 Western Michigan	#7	Magness Arena • Denver, Colorado		Miller	L 1–4	6,591	12–8–2 (8–3–0)
January 10	6:00 pm	#6 Western Michigan	#7	Magness Arena • Denver, Colorado		Miller	L 2–6	6,385	12–9–2 (8–4–0)
January 16	6:07 pm	at #5 North Dakota	#9	Ralph Engelstad Arena • Grand Forks, North Dakota (Rivalry)	Midco Sports	Miller	L 0–5	11,571	12–10–2 (8–5–0)
January 17	5:07 pm	at #5 North Dakota	#9	Ralph Engelstad Arena • Grand Forks, North Dakota (Rivalry)	Midco Sports	Miller	W 3–2	11,673	13–10–2 (9–5–0)
January 23	7:00 pm	St. Cloud State	#9	Magness Arena • Denver, Colorado		Miller	L 2–4	6,328	13–11–2 (9–6–0)
January 24	6:00 pm	St. Cloud State	#9	Magness Arena • Denver, Colorado		Hicks	W 6–0	6,281	14–11–2 (10–6–0)
January 30	7:00 pm	#7 Minnesota Duluth	#11	Magness Arena • Denver, Colorado		Hicks	W 4–3	6,320	15–11–2 (11–6–0)
January 31	6:00 pm	#7 Minnesota Duluth	#11	Magness Arena • Denver, Colorado		Hicks	W 1–0 ^{OT}	6,356	16–11–2 (12–6–0)
February 6	7:00 pm	at Colorado College	#8	Ed Robson Arena • Colorado Springs, Colorado (Rivalry)	SOCO CW	Hicks	T 2–2 ^{SOW}	3,547	16–11–3 (12–6–1)
February 7	7:00 pm	Colorado College	#8	Magness Arena • Denver, Colorado (Rivalry)		Hicks	W 4–1	7,082	17–11–3 (13–6–1)
February 13	6:00 pm	at Omaha	#8	Baxter Arena • Omaha, Nebraska		Hicks	W 5–2	6,292	18–11–3 (14–6–1)
February 14	6:00 pm	at Omaha	#8	Baxter Arena • Omaha, Nebraska		Hicks	W 3–1	6,731	19–11–3 (15–6–1)
February 27	7:00 pm	Arizona State	#8	Magness Arena • Denver, Colorado		Hicks	W 5–2	6,962	20–11–3 (16–6–1)
February 28	6:00 pm	Arizona State	#8	Magness Arena • Denver, Colorado		Hicks	W 4–1	6,847	21–11–3 (17–6–1)
NCHC Tournament
March 6	7:00 pm	Miami*	#7	Magness Arena • Denver, Colorado (NCHC Quarterfinal Game 1)		Hicks	W 3–0	5,974	22–11–3
March 7	6:00 pm	Miami*	#7	Magness Arena • Denver, Colorado (NCHC Quarterfinal Game 2)		Hicks	W 6–2	6,550	23–11–3
March 14	6:00 pm	at #4 Western Michigan*	#6	Magness Arena • Denver, Colorado (NCHC Semifinal)		Hicks	W 2–1 ^{OT}	6,327	24–11–3
March 21	6:00 pm	at #6 Minnesota Duluth*	#4	Magness Arena • Denver, Colorado (NCHC Championship)		Hicks	W 4–3 ^{2OT}	6,506	25–11–3
NCAA Tournament
March 27	4:00 pm	vs. #9 Cornell*	#4	Blue Arena • Loveland, Colorado (Regional Semifinal)	ESPN+	Hicks	W 5–0		26–11–3
March 29	1:00 pm	vs. #5 Western Michigan*	#4	Blue Arena • Loveland, Colorado (Regional Final)	ESPN2	Hicks	W 6-2		27-11-3
April 9	6:30 pm	vs. #1 Michigan*	#4	T-Mobile Arena • Las Vegas, Nevada (Frozen Four Semifinal)	ESPN2	Hicks	W 4-3 ^{2OT}		28-11-3
April 11	3:30 pm	vs. #2 Wisconsin*	#4	T-Mobile Arena • Las Vegas, Nevada (NCAA Men's Hockey National Championship)	ESPN	Hicks	W 2-1		29-11-3
*Non-conference game. ^{#}Rankings from USCHO.com Poll. All times are in Mountain Time. Source:

== Rankings ==
Ranking movements Legend: ██ Increase in ranking ██ Decrease in ranking
	Week																											
Poll	Pre	1	2	3	4	5	6	7	8	9	10	11	12	13	14	15	16	17	18	19	20	21	22	23	24	25	26	Final
USCHO.com	4	5	5	7	6	9	4	3	4	6	6	6	*	6	7	9	9	11	8	8	8	8	7	6	4	4		
USA Hockey	4	5	5	7	7	11	4	3	4	5	5	6	*	6	7	10	9	11	9	8	8	8	7	6	4	4		

Note: USCHO did not release a poll in week 12.
Note: USA Hockey did not release a poll in week 12.
