= 2025–26 Arizona State Sun Devils men's ice hockey season =

Ice Breaker Tournament, Champion Desert Hockey Classic, Champion
- Conference: NCHC
- Home ice: Mullett Arena

Record
- Overall: 14–21–1
- Conference: 7–16–1
- Home: 9–10–1
- Road: 5–11–0

Coaches and captains
- Head coach: Greg Powers
- Assistant coaches: Alex Hicks; Dana Borges; Mike Corbett

The 2025–26 Arizona State Sun Devils men's ice hockey season was the 11th season of play for the program at the Division I level and 2nd in the NCHC. The Sun Devils represented Arizona State University in the 2025–26 NCAA Division I men's ice hockey season, played their homes games at the Mullett Arena and were coached by Greg Powers in his 14th season.

== Departures ==
Player	Position	Nationality	Cause
Ryan Alexander	Forward	Canada	Transferred to Colorado College
Noah Beck	Defenseman	Canada	Graduation (signed with San Jose Sharks)
Zak Brice	Goaltender	United States	Transferred to Alaska
Benji Eckerle	Forward	United States	Graduation (retired)
Cole Gordon	Forward	United States	Transferred to Rensselaer
Cole Helm	Forward	United States	Left program (retired)
Gibson Homer	Goaltender	United States	Transferred to North Dakota
David Hymovitch	Forward	United States	Transferred to Holy Cross
Dylan Jackson	Forward	Canada	Graduation (signed with Deggendorf Fire)
Ty Jackson	Forward	Canada	Graduation (signed with Deggendorf Fire)
Ryan Kirwan	Forward	United States	Graduation (signed with Toronto Marlies)
Hunter Mullett	Defenseman	United States	Left program (retired)
Ty Murchison	Defenseman	United States	Graduation (signed with Philadelphia Flyers)
Luke Pavicich	Goaltender	United States	Graduation (signed with Orlando Solar Bears)
Charlie Schoen	Forward	United States	Transferred to St. Thomas
Artem Shlaine	Forward	Russia	Graduation (signed with Texas Stars)
Lukas Sillinger	Forward	Canada	Graduation (retired)
Ethan Szmagaj	Defenseman	United States	Graduation (signed with Savannah Ghost Pirates)

== Recruiting ==
Player	Position	Nationality	Age	Notes
Sam Alfano	Forward	Canada	21	Hamilton, ON
Richard Baran	Defenseman	Slovakia	19	Bratislava, SVK
Justin Cloutier	Forward	Canada	20	Ottawa, ON
Carmelo Crandell	Forward	Canada	20	St. Albert, AB
Connor Hasley	Goaltender	United States	24	North Tonawanda, NY; transfer from Bentley
Ben Kevan	Forward	United States	18	Fairfield, CT; selected 63rd overall in 2025
Justin Kipkie	Defenseman	Canada	20	Calgary, AB; selected 141st overall in 2025
Lincoln Kuehne	Defenseman	United States	17	Fargo, ND
Sean McGurn	Forward	Canada	23	Ottawa, ON; transfer from New Brunswick
Logan Morrell	Forward	United States	22	Mesa, AZ; transfer from Michigan Tech
Ty Nash	Forward	United States	22	Scottsdale, AZ; transfer from Alberta
Noah Powell	Forward	United States	20	Northbrook, IL; selected 148th overall in 2024
Samuel Urban	Goaltender	Slovakia	20	Dolné Kočkovce, SVK
Johnny Waldron	Forward	United States	22	Batavia, IL; transfer from Miami
Braxton Whitehead	Forward	United States	21	Palmer, AK
Austin Zemlak	Defenseman	Canada	20	Fort McMurray, AB

== Roster ==
As of August 22, 2025.

No.	Nat.	Player	Class	Pos	Height	Weight	DoB	Hometown	Previous team	NHL rights
3	(Canada)	Justin Kipkie	Freshman	D	6' 4" (1.93 m)	207 lb (94 kg)	2005-07-28	Calgary, Alberta	Victoria Royals (WHL)	MIN, 141st overall 2025
4	(Canada)	Austin Zemlak	Freshman	D	6' 1" (1.85 m)	185 lb (84 kg)	2005-02-26	Fort McMurray, Alberta	Tri-City Americans (WHL)	—
5	(Slovakia)	Richard Baran	Freshman	D	6' 1" (1.85 m)	185 lb (84 kg)	2005-10-24	Bratislava, Slovakia	Des Moines Buccaneers (USHL)	—
7	(Sweden)	Joel Kjellberg	Sophomore	D	6' 0" (1.83 m)	190 lb (86 kg)	2004-04-29	Nacka, Sweden	Cedar Rapids RoughRiders (USHL)	—
9	(United States)	Anthony Dowd	Junior	D	5' 6" (1.68 m)	154 lb (70 kg)	2003-04-25	Point Pleasant Beach, New Jersey	Chicago Steel (USHL)	—
10	(United States)	Tucker Ness	Senior	D	6' 3" (1.91 m)	219 lb (99 kg)	2002-11-25	Plymouth, Minnesota	Waterloo Black Hawks (USHL)	—
11	(United States)	Lincoln Kuehne	Freshman	D	6' 2" (1.88 m)	201 lb (91 kg)	2007-11-28	Fargo, North Dakota	USNTDP (USHL)	—
12	(United States)	Cullen Potter	Sophomore	F	5' 10" (1.78 m)	172 lb (78 kg)	2007-01-10	Hortonville, Wisconsin	USNTDP (USHL)	CGY, 32nd overall 2025
14	(Canada)	Carmelo Crandell	Freshman	F	5' 11" (1.8 m)	176 lb (80 kg)	2005-03-02	St. Albert, Alberta	Tri-City Storm (USHL)	—
15	(United States)	Noah Powell	Sophomore	F	6' 2" (1.88 m)	201 lb (91 kg)	2005-02-02	Northbrook, Illinois	Ohio State (Big Ten)	PHI, 148th overall 2024
16	(Canada)	Sean McGurn	Junior	F	5' 10" (1.78 m)	170 lb (77 kg)	2002-07-30	Ottawa, Ontario	New Brunswick (AUS)	—
17	(United States)	John Waldron	Senior	F	6' 1" (1.85 m)	185 lb (84 kg)	2002-11-13	Batavia, Illinois	Miami (NCHC)	—
19	(United States)	Logan Morrell	Sophomore	F	6' 3" (1.91 m)	194 lb (88 kg)	2003-08-02	Mesa, Arizona	Michigan Tech (CCHA)	—
22	(United States)	Ty Nash	Sophomore	F	5' 11" (1.8 m)	179 lb (81 kg)	2003-05-22	Scottsdale, Arizona	Alberta (CWUAA)	—
23	(United States)	Bennett Schimek	Senior	F	6' 0" (1.83 m)	188 lb (85 kg)	2003-04-15	Mendota Heights, Minnesota	Providence (USHL)	—
24	(Canada)	Justin Cloutier	Freshman	F	5' 9" (1.75 m)	187 lb (85 kg)	2005-06-20	Ottawa, Ontario	Soo Greyhounds (OHL)	—
25	(United States)	Kyle Smolen	Junior	F	5' 11" (1.8 m)	171 lb (78 kg)	2002-06-18	Crystal Lake, Illinois	Fargo Force (USHL)	—
27	(Canada)	Sam Alfano	Freshman	F	6' 4" (1.93 m)	205 lb (93 kg)	2004-01-18	Hamilton, Ontario	Erie Otters (OHL)	—
30	(Canada)	Chase Hamm	Junior	G	5' 9" (1.75 m)	168 lb (76 kg)	2002-01-06	Saskatoon, Saskatchewan	Arizona State (ACHA)	—
31	(Slovakia)	Samuel Urban	Freshman	G	6' 0" (1.83 m)	198 lb (90 kg)	2005-05-01	Dolné Kočkovce, Slovakia	Sioux City Musketeers (USHL)	—
33	(United States)	Connor Hasley	Senior	G	6' 1" (1.85 m)	193 lb (88 kg)	2001-02-27	North Tonawanda, New York	Bentley (AHA)	—
37	(Canada)	Sam Court	Sophomore	D	5' 10" (1.78 m)	190 lb (86 kg)	2004-01-07	Winnipeg, Manitoba	Sioux City Musketeers (USHL)	—
48	(United States)	Ben Kevan	Freshman	F	6' 1" (1.85 m)	179 lb (81 kg)	2007-01-03	Fairfield, California	USNTDP (USHL)	NJD, 63rd overall 2025
49	(United States)	Braxton Whitehead	Freshman	F	5' 10" (1.78 m)	163 lb (74 kg)	2004-06-09	Palmer, Alaska	Regina Pats (WHL)	—
51	(United States)	Cruz Lucius	Senior	F	6' 0" (1.83 m)	178 lb (81 kg)	2004-04-05	Grant, Minnesota	Wisconsin (Big Ten)	PIT, 124th overall 2022
74	(United States)	Brasen Boser	Sophomore	D	5' 11" (1.8 m)	176 lb (80 kg)	2004-02-29	Minot, North Dakota	Fargo Force (USHL)	—
89	(United States)	Tony Achille	Junior	F	5' 11" (1.8 m)	173 lb (78 kg)	2002-01-08	Hingham, Massachusetts	Maine Nordiques (NAHL)	—

== Standings ==
2025–26 National Collegiate Hockey Conference Standings
	Conference record										Overall record					
	GP	W	L	T	OTW	OTL	SW	PTS	GF	GA	GP	W	L	T	GF	GA
#4 North Dakota †	24	17	6	1	1	4	0	55	96	58	40	29	10	1	151	90
#1 Denver *	24	17	6	1	2	1	1	52	82	51	43	29	11	3	154	90
#6 Western Michigan	24	16	7	1	3	1	1	48	89	65	39	27	11	1	140	95
#7 Minnesota Duluth	24	11	12	1	3	4	1	36	64	66	40	24	15	1	130	99
St. Cloud State	24	9	14	1	1	2	1	30	63	86	36	16	19	1	112	112
Colorado College	24	7	11	6	2	3	1	29	63	66	36	13	17	6	95	98
Miami	24	9	13	2	3	1	1	28	60	74	36	18	16	2	104	108
Omaha	24	8	16	0	0	0	0	24	57	86	36	12	24	0	95	129
Arizona State	24	7	16	1	2	1	1	22	62	94	36	14	21	1	106	132
Championship: March 21, 2026 † indicates conference regular season champion (Penrose Cup) * indicates conference tournament champion (National Cup); Rankings: USCHO.com Top 20 Poll; updated April 13, 2026

== Schedule and results ==
Date	Time	Opponent^{#}	Rank^{#}	Site	TV	Decision	Result	Attendance	Record
Regular Season
October 3	8:00 pm	#5 Penn State*	#14	Mullett Arena • Tempe, Arizona	NHL Network	Hasley	L 3–6	5,270	0–1–0
October 4	6:00 pm	#5 Penn State*	#14	Mullett Arena • Tempe, Arizona	NHL Network	Hasley	L 2–4	5,247	0–2–0
Ice Breaker Tournament
October 10	7:00 pm	Notre Dame*	#15	Mullett Arena • Tempe, Arizona (Ice Breaker Semifinal)	Fox 10	Urban	W 5–3	5,039	1–2–0
October 11	7:00 pm	Alaska*	#15	Mullett Arena • Tempe, Arizona (Ice Breaker Championship)	Fox 10	Hasley	W 5–2	—	2–2–0
October 17	6:07 pm	at Augustana*	#15	Midco Arena • Sioux Falls, South Dakota	Midco Sports+	Hasley	L 2–4	2,710	2–3–0
October 18	5:07 pm	at Augustana*	#15	Midco Arena • Sioux Falls, South Dakota	Midco Sports+	Urban	L 2–5	2,913	2–4–0
October 31	4:05 pm	at Miami		Steve Cady Arena • Oxford, Ohio	RESN	Hasley	W 4–1	2,007	3–4–0 (1–0–0)
November 1	3:05 pm	at Miami		Steve Cady Arena • Oxford, Ohio	RESN	Hasley	L 2–5	2,608	3–5–0 (1–1–0)
November 7	7:00 pm	#20 Colorado College		Mullett Arena • Tempe, Arizona	SOCO CW	Urban	T 3–3 ^{SOW}	4,924	3–5–1 (1–1–1)
November 8	5:00 pm	#20 Colorado College		Mullett Arena • Tempe, Arizona		Urban	L 1–3	4,922	3–6–1 (1–2–1)
November 14	6:07 pm	at #6 North Dakota		Ralph Engelstad Arena • Grand Forks, North Dakota	Midco Sports, TSN3, Fox 10 Xtra	Urban	L 2–5	11,572	3–7–1 (1–3–1)
November 15	5:07 pm	at #6 North Dakota		Ralph Engelstad Arena • Grand Forks, North Dakota	Midco Sports, Fox 10 Xtra	Hasley	W 4–2	11,590	4–7–1 (2–3–1)
November 21	7:00 pm	#3 Denver		Mullett Arena • Tempe, Arizona	Fox 10 Xtra	Urban	L 1–7	5,002	4–8–1 (2–4–1)
November 22	5:00 pm	#3 Denver		Mullett Arena • Tempe, Arizona	Fox 10 Xtra	Hasley	W 3–2 ^{OT}	4,896	5–8–1 (3–4–1)
November 28	3:00 pm	Ohio State		Mullett Arena • Tempe, Arizona		Hasley	W 3–2 ^{OT}	4,507	6–8–1
November 29	5:00 pm	Ohio State		Mullett Arena • Tempe, Arizona	Fox 10	Hasley	W 4–3 ^{OT}	4,867	7–8–1
December 12	6:07 pm	at #5 Minnesota Duluth		AMSOIL Arena • Duluth, Minnesota	My9	Hasley	L 1–3	5,583	7–9–1 (3–5–1)
December 13	4:07 pm	at #5 Minnesota Duluth		AMSOIL Arena • Duluth, Minnesota	My9	Urban	W 6–3	5,749	8–9–1 (4–5–1)
Ledyard Bank Classic
December 27	3:00 pm	at #8 Dartmouth*		Thompson Arena • Hanover, New Hampshire (Ledyard Bank Classic Game 1)	ESPN+	Hasley	W 5–1	3,636	9–9–1
December 28	1:00 pm	at #8 Dartmouth*		Thompson Arena • Hanover, New Hampshire (Ledyard Bank Classic Game 2)	ESPN+	Hasley	L 1–4	2,855	9–10–1
Desert Hockey Classic
January 2	7:00 pm	Alaska Anchorage*		Mullett Arena • Tempe, Arizona (Desert Hockey Semifinal)		Urban	W 7–2	5,050	10–10–1
January 3	7:00 pm	Air Force*		Mullett Arena • Tempe, Arizona (Desert Hockey Championship)		Hasley	W 5–2	4,556	11–10–1
January 9	7:00 pm	Miami		Mullett Arena • Tempe, Arizona		Hasley	L 1–2 ^{OT}	4,995	11–11–1 (4–6–1)
January 10	5:00 pm	Miami		Mullett Arena • Tempe, Arizona		Urban	W 1–0	5,025	12–11–1 (5–6–1)
January 23	7:00 pm	#4 North Dakota		Mullett Arena • Tempe, Arizona		Hasley	L 4–7	5,100	12–12–1 (5–7–1)
January 24	5:00 pm	#4 North Dakota		Mullett Arena • Tempe, Arizona		Urban	L 3–5	5,200	12–13–1 (5–8–1)
January 30	7:00 pm	at Colorado College		Ed Robson Arena • Colorado Springs, Colorado	SOCO CW, SNP	Urban	W 6–5 ^{OT}	3,532	13–13–1 (6–8–1)
January 31	6:00 pm	at Colorado College		Ed Robson Arena • Colorado Springs, Colorado		Urban	L 1–4	3,539	13–14–1 (6–9–1)
February 6	7:00 pm	St. Cloud State		Mullett Arena • Tempe, Arizona		Urban	L 1–4	5,126	13–15–1 (6–10–1)
February 7	6:00 pm	St. Cloud State		Mullett Arena • Tempe, Arizona		Urban	L 3–4	5,047	13–16–1 (6–11–1)
February 13	5:00 pm	at #4 Western Michigan		Lawson Arena • Kalamazoo, Michigan		Hasley	L 2–6	3,325	13–17–1 (6–12–1)
February 14	4:00 pm	at #4 Western Michigan		Lawson Arena • Kalamazoo, Michigan		Urban	L 2–7	3,358	13–18–1 (6–13–1)
February 20	7:00 pm	Omaha		Mullett Arena • Tempe, Arizona		Hasley	L 2–4	4,987	13–19–1 (6–14–1)
February 21	5:00 pm	Omaha		Mullett Arena • Tempe, Arizona		Hasley	W 6–3	5,027	14–19–1 (7–14–1)
February 27	7:00 pm	at #8 Denver		Magness Arena • Denver, Colorado		Urban	L 2–5	6,962	14–20–1 (7–15–1)
February 28	6:00 pm	at #8 Denver		Magness Arena • Denver, Colorado		Hasley	L 1–4	6,847	14–21–1 (7–16–1)
*Non-conference game. ^{#}Rankings from USCHO.com Poll. All times are in Mountain Time. Source:

== Rankings ==
Poll	Week																											
Poll	Pre	1	2	3	4	5	6	7	8	9	10	11	12	13	14	15	16	17	18	19	20	21	22	23	24	25	26	27 (Final)
USCHO.com	14	15	15	RV	RV	RV	RV	RV	RV	RV	RV	RV	–	RV	RV	RV	RV	RV	NR	NR	NR	NR	NR	NR	NR			
USA Hockey	14	15	16	RV	NR	RV	NR	NR	NR	RV	RV	RV	–	RV	RV	RV	RV	RV	NR	NR	NR	NR	NR	NR	NR			

Note: USCHO did not release a poll in week 12.
Note: USA Hockey did not release a poll in week 12.
