= Ice Breaker Tournament =

Annual sporting exhibition games for American college ice hockey teams

Tournament information
- Sport: College ice hockey
- Number of tournaments: 29
- Teams: 4

Current champion
- Bowling Green

The Ice Breaker Tournament (also called the Ice Breaker Invitational or the Ice Breaker Cup) is a college Division I men's ice hockey tournament played annually at the start of each season.

The tournament began play in 1997 as an exhibition and was created as an early-season showcase for top-ranked teams from four separate conferences. After the first year the games became an official part of the NCAA season and counted towards the standings. The participants are selected partially based upon their pre-season rankings with one of the four usually serving as the host. Twice, in 2010 and 2012, local sports commissions served as hosts when there was no local university available. Only Minnesota has played in consecutive Ice Breaker Tournaments (2013, 2014). The tournament is typically held during the opening weekend of college hockey season.

Due to the 2020 edition being cancelled because of the COVID-19 pandemic, the tournament was held twice in 2021 in successive weeks. The first tournament (East) had a predetermined schedule rather than utilizing an elimination format; the winner and placement was determined by highest record in the two games. The second tournament (West) returned to the normal championship/consolation format.

The 2022 edition was co-hosted by Air Force and Denver, necessitating a predetermined schedule rather than an elimination format. The 2025 edition was hosted by Arizona State.

== Yearly results ==
Year	Champion	Runner-up	Third place	Fourth place	Venue (Host)
2026	Bowling Green	Connecticut	Sacred Heart	Penn State	Martire Family Arena (Sacred Heart) Toscano Family Ice Forum (Connecticut)
2025	Arizona State	Notre Dame	Quinnipiac	Alaska	Mullett Arena (Arizona State)
2024	Omaha	Minnesota	Massachusetts	Air Force	Orleans Arena (Minnesota)
2023	North Dakota	Bemidji State	Wisconsin	Army	Sanford Center (Bemidji) Ralph Engelstad Arena (Grand Forks)
2022	Denver	Maine	Air Force	Notre Dame	Cadet Ice Arena (Colorado Springs) Magness Arena (Denver)
2021 (West)	Michigan	Minnesota State	Minnesota Duluth	Providence	AMSOIL Arena (Duluth)
2021 (East)	Boston College	Quinnipiac	Northeastern	Holy Cross	DCU Center (Holy Cross)
2019	Ohio State	RIT	Western Michigan	Bowling Green	Huntington Center (Bowling Green)
2018	Notre Dame	Providence	Miami	Mercyhurst	Erie Insurance Arena (Mercyhurst)
2017	Michigan Tech	Minnesota–Duluth	Minnesota	Union	AMSOIL Arena (Duluth)
2016	Air Force	Ohio State	Boston College	Denver	Magness Arena (Denver)
2015	North Dakota	Maine	Michigan State	Lake Superior State	Cumberland County Civic Center (Maine)
2014	Minnesota	Rensselaer	Minnesota–Duluth	Notre Dame	Compton Family Ice Arena (Notre Dame)
2013	Minnesota	New Hampshire	Clarkson	Mercyhurst	Mariucci Arena (Minnesota)
2012	Notre Dame	Nebraska–Omaha	Maine	Army	Sprint Center (Kansas City Sports Commission)
2011	Boston College	North Dakota	Michigan State	Air Force	Ralph Engelstad Arena (North Dakota)
2010	Boston University	Notre Dame	Wisconsin	Holy Cross	Scottrade Center (St. Louis Sports Commission)
2009	Nebraska–Omaha	Massachusetts–Lowell	St. Lawrence	Army	Qwest Center (Nebraska–Omaha)
2008	Boston University	Michigan State	Massachusetts	North Dakota	Agganis Arena (Boston University)
2007	Minnesota	Michigan	Boston College	Rensselaer	Xcel Energy Center (Minnesota)
2006	Vermont	Miami	Denver	Colgate	Goggin Ice Arena (Miami)
2005	Colorado College	Maine	Air Force	Union	World Arena (Colorado College)
2004	New Hampshire	St. Lawrence	St. Cloud State	Ohio State	Whittemore Center (New Hampshire)
2003	Boston College	Findlay	Michigan State	Minnesota–Duluth	Munn Ice Arena (Michigan State)
2002	Boston University	Rensselaer	Wisconsin	Northern Michigan	Kohl Center (Wisconsin)
2001	St. Cloud State	Maine	Bowling Green	Clarkson	Alfond Arena (Maine)
2000	New Hampshire	Colgate	Michigan†; North Dakota†	None†	Yost Ice Arena (Michigan)
1999	Denver	Providence	Notre Dame	Union	Magness Arena (Denver)
1998	Boston College	St. Lawrence	Minnesota	Ohio State	Mariucci Arena (Minnesota)
1997	Michigan State	Wisconsin	Boston University	Clarkson	Dane County Coliseum (Wisconsin)

† Michigan and North Dakota declined to participate in a shootout to determine a winner

== Team records ==
Team	# of times participated	Titles	Conference
Boston College	6	4	Hockey East
Minnesota	5	3	Big Ten
Boston University	4	3	Hockey East
New Hampshire	3	2	Hockey East
North Dakota	5	2	NCHC
Michigan State	5	1	Big Ten
Notre Dame	5	1	Big Ten
Ohio State	4	1	Big Ten
Air Force	3	1	Atlantic Hockey
Bowling Green	3	1	CCHA
Denver	3	1	NCHC
Michigan	3	1	Big Ten
Nebraska–Omaha	2	1	NCHC
St. Cloud	2	1	NCHC
Arizona State	1	1	NCHC
Colorado College	1	1	NCHC
Michigan Tech	1	1	CCHA
Vermont	1	1	Hockey East
Maine	4	0	Hockey East
Minnesota–Duluth	4	0	NCHC
Clarkson	3	0	ECAC Hockey
Rensselaer	3	0	ECAC Hockey
St. Lawrence	3	0	ECAC Hockey
Union	3	0	ECAC Hockey
Wisconsin	4	0	Big Ten
Army	3	0	AHA
Colgate	2	0	ECAC Hockey
Holy Cross	2	0	AHA
Providence	2	0	Hockey East
Quinnipiac	2	0	ECAC Hockey
Alaska	1	0	Independent
Bemidji State	1	0	CCHA
Connecticut	1	0	Hockey East
Findlay	1	0	CHA
Lake Superior State	1	0	CCHA
Massachusetts	1	0	Hockey East
Massachusetts–Lowell	1	0	Hockey East
Mercyhurst	1	0	AHA
Miami	1	0	NCHC
Minnesota State	1	0	CCHA
Northeastern	1	0	Hockey East
Northern Michigan	1	0	CCHA
Penn State	1	0	Big Ten
RIT	1	0	AHA
Sacred Heart	1	0	AHA
Western Michigan	1	0	NCHC
