= 2025–26 Miami RedHawks men's ice hockey season =

Friendship Four, Champion
- Conference: NCHC
- Home ice: Steve Cady Arena

Record
- Overall: 18–16–2
- Conference: 9–13–2
- Home: 7–5–2
- Road: 8–10–0
- Neutral: 3–1–0

Coaches and captains
- Head coach: Anthony Noreen
- Assistant coaches: Troy Thibodeau; David Nies; Lionel Mauron

The 2025–26 Miami RedHawks men's ice hockey season will be the 48th season of play for the program and the 13th in the NCHC. The RedHawks will represent Miami University in the 2025–26 NCAA Division I men's ice hockey season, play their home games at the Steve Cady Arena and be coached by Anthony Noreen in his 2nd season.

== Season ==
Shika Gadžijev was a member of the roster at the start of the season, however he was ineligible to play during the fall semester. Once the NCAA ruled that he would also be ineligible for the spring semester, Gadžijev was removed from the active roster and replaced by Mathis Langevin, who joined from the Rimouski Océanic.

== Departures ==
| Player | Position | Nationality | Cause |
|---|---|---|---|
| Colby Ambrosio | Forward | Canada | Graduation (signed with Toledo Walleye) |
| Tanyon Bajzer | Forward | United States | Transferred to Alaska Anchorage |
| Bruno Brūveris | Goaltender | Latvia | Transferred to Rensselaer |
| Frankie Carogioiello | Forward | Canada | Transferred to St. Lawrence |
| Matt Choupani | Forward | Canada | Graduation (signed with Savannah Ghost Pirates) |
| Spencer Cox | Defenseman/Forward | United States | Graduation (signed with Indy Fuel) |
| Ethan Dahlmeir | Goaltender | United States | Transferred to Minnesota Duluth |
| Zane Demsey | Defenseman | United States | Transferred to Northern Michigan |
| Max Dukovac | Forward | United States | Transferred to Ferris State |
| Michael Feenstra | Defenseman | United States | Left program |
| Christophe Fillion | Forward | Canada | Graduation (signed with Idaho Steelheads) |
| Teodor Forssander | Forward | Sweden | Signed professional contract (Tyringe SoSS) |
| Shika Gadžijev | Goaltender | Slovakia | Ruled ineligible by NCAA |
| William Hallén | Forward | Sweden | Left program |
| Conner Hutchison | Defenseman | United States | Graduation (signed with Greenville Swamp Rabbits) |
| Brett Miller | Goaltender | United States | Graduation (signed with Cincinnati Cyclones) |
| Dylan Moulton | Defenseman | United States | Graduation (signed with Toledo Walleye) |
| Hampus Rydqvist | Defenseman | Sweden | Graduation (signed with Sparta Sarpsborg) |
| Brian Silver | Defenseman | United States | Graduation (retired) |
| Rihards Simanovičs | Defenseman | Latvia | Transferred to Bowling Green |
| Ryan Sullivan | Forward | United States | Graduation (signed with Savannah Ghost Pirates) |
| Artur Turanský | Forward | Slovakia | Signed professional contract (HK Spišská Nová Ves) |
| Raimonds Vītoliņš | Forward | Latvia | Graduation (signed with HK Dukla Trenčín) |
| John Waldron | Forward | United States | Transferred to Arizona State |

== Recruiting ==
| Player | Position | Nationality | Age | Notes |
|---|---|---|---|---|
| Kyle Aucoin | Defenseman | Canada | 23 | Ottawa, ON; graduate transfer from Harvard; selected 156th overall in 2020 |
| Kocha Delic | Forward | Canada | 21 | Ottawa, ON |
| David Deputy | Forward | United States | 21 | Gurnee, IL |
| Matteo Drobac | Goaltender | Canada | 22 | Oakville, ON; transfer from Western Ontario |
| Shika Gadžijev | Goaltender | Slovakia | 20 | Makhachkala, RUS |
| Matteo Giampa | Forward | Canada | 22 | Virgil, ON; transfer from Canisius |
| Doug Grimes | Forward | United States | 23 | Brookline, MA; transfer from Boston University |
| Ethan Hay | Forward | Canada | 20 | Waterloo, ON; selected 211th overall in 2023 |
| Maximilion Helgeson | Forward | United States | 24 | Anchorage, AK; transfer from Alaska Anchorage |
| Owen Lalonde | Defenseman | Canada | 25 | Windsor, ON; graduate transfer from Queen's |
| Mathis Langevin | Goaltender | Canada | 19 | Saint-Zotique, QC; joined mid-season |
| Vladislav Lukashevich | Defenseman | Russia | 22 | Magadan, RUS; transfer from Michigan State; selected 120th overall in 2021 |
| Shaun McEwen | Defenseman | United States | 21 | Hadley, MA |
| Charlie Michaud | Defenseman | United States | 19 | Denver, CO |
| Nicholas Mikan | Forward | United States | 21 | Edina, MN; transfer from St. Thomas |
| Ilia Morozov | Forward | Russia | 17 | Moskva, RUS |
| Benji Motew | Goaltender | United States | 20 | Glencoe, IL |
| Michael Phelan | Defenseman | United States | 19 | Hinsdale, IL |
| Ryan Smith | Forward | United States | 19 | Pendleton, NY; transfer from Quinnipiac |
| Justin Stupka | Forward | United States | 20 | Pittsburgh, PA |
| Ryder Thompson | Defenseman | Canada | 21 | Russell, MB |
| Bradley Walker | Forward | United States | 20 | Orono, MN |

== Roster ==
As of December 20, 2025.

| No. | Nat. | Player | Class | Pos | Height | Weight | DoB | Hometown | Previous team | NHL rights |
|---|---|---|---|---|---|---|---|---|---|---|
| 2 | (United States) | Shaun McEwen | Freshman | D | 6' 0" (1.83 m) | 192 lb (87 kg) | 2004-01-21 | Hadley, Massachusetts | Tri-City Storm (USHL) | — |
| 3 | (United States) | Nick Donato | Graduate | D | 6' 0" (1.83 m) | 190 lb (86 kg) | 2002-07-27 | Lake Forest, Illinois | Tri-City Storm (USHL) | — |
| 6 | (United States) | Michael Quinn | Sophomore | D | 5' 11" (1.8 m) | 172 lb (78 kg) | 2003-03-25 | St. Louis, Missouri | Fargo Force (USHL) | — |
| 7 | (United States) | Charlie Michaud | Freshman | D | 6' 0" (1.83 m) | 196 lb (89 kg) | 2006-08-12 | Denver, Colorado | Madison Capitols (USHL) | — |
| 8 | (United States) | John Emmons | Sophomore | F | 5' 11" (1.8 m) | 170 lb (77 kg) | 2004-01-05 | Washington, Michigan | Minot Minotauros (NAHL) | — |
| 9 | (Canada) | Kyle Aucoin | Graduate | D | 6' 0" (1.83 m) | 175 lb (79 kg) | 2002-07-02 | Ottawa, Ontario | Harvard (ECAC) | DET, 156th overall 2020 |
| 10 | (United States) | Nicholas Mikan | Sophomore | F | 6' 4" (1.93 m) | 229 lb (104 kg) | 2004-03-31 | Edina, Minnesota | St. Thomas (CCHA) | — |
| 11 | (United States) | Justin Stupka | Freshman | F | 6' 2" (1.88 m) | 214 lb (97 kg) | 2005-03-15 | Pittsburgh, Pennsylvania | Sioux City Musketeers (USHL) | — |
| 12 | (Canada) | Owen Lalonde | Graduate | D | 6' 1" (1.85 m) | 187 lb (85 kg) | 2000-02-01 | Windsor, Ontario | Queen's (OUA) | — |
| 13 | (Canada) | Kocha Delic | Freshman | F | 5' 11" (1.8 m) | 198 lb (90 kg) | 2004-03-11 | Ottawa, Ontario | Sudbury Wolves (OHL) | — |
| 14 | (United States) | Ryan Smith | Sophomore | F | 5' 9" (1.75 m) | 179 lb (81 kg) | 2005-10-03 | Pendleton, New York | Quinnipiac (ECAC) | — |
| 17 | (United States) | Maximilion Helgeson | Senior (RS) | F | 6' 1" (1.85 m) | 185 lb (84 kg) | 2000-12-05 | Anchorage, Alaska | Alaska Anchorage (NCAA) | — |
| 18 | (Russia) | Ilia Morozov | Freshman | F | 6' 3" (1.91 m) | 196 lb (89 kg) | 2008-08-03 | Moskva, Russia | Tri-City Storm (USHL) | — |
| 19 | (United States) | Doug Grimes | Junior | F | 6' 3" (1.91 m) | 205 lb (93 kg) | 2002-04-18 | Brookline, Massachusetts | Boston University (HEA) | — |
| 20 | (United States) | David Deputy | Freshman | F | 5' 9" (1.75 m) | 185 lb (84 kg) | 2004-06-25 | Gurnee, Illinois | Muskegon Lumberjacks (USHL) | — |
| 21 | (United States) | Bradley Walker | Freshman | F | 6' 1" (1.85 m) | 194 lb (88 kg) | 2004-12-13 | Orono, Minnesota | Waterloo Black Hawks (USHL) | — |
| 23 | (Canada) | Brayden Morrison | Senior | F | 5' 11" (1.8 m) | 175 lb (79 kg) | 2002-05-04 | Calgary, Alberta | Dubuque Fighting Saints (USHL) | — |
| 26 | (United States) | Blake Mesenburg | Senior | F | 5' 11" (1.8 m) | 183 lb (83 kg) | 2002-06-05 | Orono, Minnesota | St. Cloud Norsemen (NAHL) | — |
| 31 | (Canada) | Mathis Langevin | Freshman | G | 6' 4" (1.93 m) | 201 lb (91 kg) | 2006-06-18 | Saint-Zotique, Quebec | Rimouski Océanic (QMJHL) | — |
| 33 | (Sweden) | Casper Nässén | Sophomore | F | 6' 4" (1.93 m) | 205 lb (93 kg) | 2004-04-11 | Norrtälje, Sweden | Frölunda HC J20 (J20 Nationell) | BOS, 214th overall 2023 |
| 35 | (United States) | Benji Motew | Freshman | G | 6' 0" (1.83 m) | 185 lb (84 kg) | 2004-11-24 | Glencoe, Illinois | Corpus Christi IceRays (NAHL) | — |
| 43 | (Canada) | Ryder Thompson | Freshman | D | 5' 11" (1.8 m) | 183 lb (83 kg) | 2004-06-18 | Russell, Manitoba | Portland Winterhawks (WHL) | — |
| 45 | (Canada) | Matteo Drobac | Sophomore | G | 6' 2" (1.88 m) | 201 lb (91 kg) | 2003-08-07 | Oakville, Ontario | Western Ontario (OUA) | — |
| 68 | (Canada) | Ethan Hay | Freshman | F | 6' 1" (1.85 m) | 194 lb (88 kg) | 2005-01-15 | Waterloo, Ontario | Kingston Frontenacs (OHL) | TBL, 211th overall 2023 |
| 71 | (Russia) | Vladislav Lukashevich | Sophomore | D | 6' 1" (1.85 m) | 172 lb (78 kg) | 2003-05-23 | Magadan, Russia | Michigan State (Big Ten) | FLA, 120th overall 2021 |
| 73 | (United States) | Michael Phelan | Freshman | D | 6' 0" (1.83 m) | 176 lb (80 kg) | 2006-05-04 | Hinsdale, Illinois | Waterloo Black Hawks (USHL) | — |
| 81 | (United States) | David Grosek | Sophomore | F | 6' 1" (1.85 m) | 190 lb (86 kg) | 2003-06-23 | Doylestown, Pennsylvania | Maine Nordiques (NAHL) | — |
| 91 | (Canada) | Matteo Giampa | Junior | F | 6' 1" (1.85 m) | 190 lb (86 kg) | 2003-09-03 | Virgil, Ontario | Canisius (AHA) | — |

== Standings ==
2025–26 National Collegiate Hockey Conference Standings
| | Conference record | | | | | | | | | | Overall record | | | | | |
| | GP | W | L | T | OTW | OTL | SW | PTS | GF | GA | GP | W | L | T | GF | GA |
|---|---|---|---|---|---|---|---|---|---|---|---|---|---|---|---|---|
| #4 North Dakota † | 24 | 17 | 6 | 1 | 1 | 4 | 0 | 55 | 96 | 58 | 40 | 29 | 10 | 1 | 151 | 90 |
| #1 Denver * | 24 | 17 | 6 | 1 | 2 | 1 | 1 | 52 | 82 | 51 | 43 | 29 | 11 | 3 | 154 | 90 |
| #6 Western Michigan | 24 | 16 | 7 | 1 | 3 | 1 | 1 | 48 | 89 | 65 | 39 | 27 | 11 | 1 | 140 | 95 |
| #7 Minnesota Duluth | 24 | 11 | 12 | 1 | 3 | 4 | 1 | 36 | 64 | 66 | 40 | 24 | 15 | 1 | 130 | 99 |
| St. Cloud State | 24 | 9 | 14 | 1 | 1 | 2 | 1 | 30 | 63 | 86 | 36 | 16 | 19 | 1 | 112 | 112 |
| Colorado College | 24 | 7 | 11 | 6 | 2 | 3 | 1 | 29 | 63 | 66 | 36 | 13 | 17 | 6 | 95 | 98 |
| Miami | 24 | 9 | 13 | 2 | 3 | 1 | 1 | 28 | 60 | 74 | 36 | 18 | 16 | 2 | 104 | 108 |
| Omaha | 24 | 8 | 16 | 0 | 0 | 0 | 0 | 24 | 57 | 86 | 36 | 12 | 24 | 0 | 95 | 129 |
| Arizona State | 24 | 7 | 16 | 1 | 2 | 1 | 1 | 22 | 62 | 94 | 36 | 14 | 21 | 1 | 106 | 132 |
Championship: March 21, 2026 † indicates conference regular season champion (Penrose Cup) * indicates conference tournament champion (National Cup); Rankings: USCHO.com Top 20 Poll; updated April 13, 2026

== Schedule and results ==
| Date | Time | Opponent^{#} | Rank^{#} | Site | TV | Decision | Result | Attendance | Record |
Regular Season
| October 3 | 7:05 pm | Ferris State* | | Steve Cady Arena • Oxford, Ohio | RESN | Drobac | W 6–4 | 2,572 | 1–0–0 |
| October 4 | 6:05 pm | Ferris State* | | Steve Cady Arena • Oxford, Ohio | RESN | Drobac | W 3–1 | 2,101 | 2–0–0 |
| October 10 | 7:00 pm | at Rensselaer* | | Houston Field House • Troy, New York | ESPN+, SNY | Drobac | W 5–3 | 1,386 | 3–0–0 |
| October 11 | 6:00 pm | at Rensselaer* | | Houston Field House • Troy, New York | ESPN+ | Drobac | W 5–0 | 1,575 | 4–0–0 |
| October 24 | 8:10 pm | at Lindenwood* | | Centene Community Ice Center • St. Charles, Missouri | | Drobac | W 5–4 ^{OT} | 1,586 | 5–0–0 |
| October 25 | 8:10 pm | at Lindenwood* | | Centene Community Ice Center • St. Charles, Missouri | | Drobac | W 5–4 ^{OT} | 1,443 | 6–0–0 |
| October 31 | 7:05 pm | Arizona State | | Steve Cady Arena • Oxford, Ohio | RESN | Drobac | L 1–4 | 2,007 | 6–1–0 (0–1–0) |
| November 1 | 6:05 pm | Arizona State | | Steve Cady Arena • Oxford, Ohio | RESN | Drobac | W 5–2 | 2,608 | 7–1–0 (1–1–0) |
| November 14 | 7:00 pm | at #9 Western Michigan | | Lawson Arena • Kalamazoo, Michigan | | Drobac | L 2–5 | 3,271 | 7–2–0 (1–2–0) |
| November 15 | 6:00 pm | at #9 Western Michigan | | Lawson Arena • Kalamazoo, Michigan | | Drobac | L 2–6 | 3,763 | 7–3–0 (1–3–0) |
| November 21 | 7:05 pm | St. Cloud State | | Steve Cady Arena • Oxford, Ohio | RESN | Drobac | W 6–5 ^{OT} | 3,642 | 8–3–0 (2–3–0) |
| November 22 | 6:05 pm | St. Cloud State | | Steve Cady Arena • Oxford, Ohio | RESN | Drobac | L 2–4 | 2,809 | 8–4–0 (2–4–0) |
Friendship Four
| November 28 | 2:00 pm | vs. RIT* | | SSE Arena Belfast • Belfast, Northern Ireland (Friendship Four Semifinal) | | Drobac | W 4–0 | 3,601 | 9–4–0 |
| November 29 | 2:00 pm | vs. #20 Union* | | SSE Arena Belfast • Belfast, Northern Ireland (Friendship Four Championship) | | Drobac | W 3–2 | 5,122 | 10–4–0 |
| December 5 | 9:00 pm | at #6 Denver | #19 | Magness Arena • Denver, Colorado | | Drobac | L 0–4 | 6,223 | 10–5–0 (2–5–0) |
| December 6 | 8:00 pm | at #6 Denver | #19 | Magness Arena • Denver, Colorado | | Drobac | L 2–5 | 6,172 | 10–6–0 (2–6–0) |
| December 12 | 7:05 pm | #19 Colorado College | | Steve Cady Arena • Oxford, Ohio | RESN | Drobac | T 4–4 ^{SOW} | 1,521 | 10–6–1 (2–6–1) |
| December 13 | 6:05 pm | #19 Colorado College | | Steve Cady Arena • Oxford, Ohio | RESN | Drobac | T 3–3 ^{SOL} | 1,003 | 10–6–2 (2–6–2) |
Great Lakes Invitational
| December 28 | 3:30 pm | vs. Michigan Tech* | | Van Andel Arena • Grand Rapids, Michigan (Great Lakes Semifinal) | Midco Sports+ | Drobac | L 2–5 | 7,764 | 10–7–2 |
| December 29 | 3:30 pm | vs. Ferris State* | | Van Andel Arena • Grand Rapids, Michigan (Great Lakes Consolation Game) | Midco Sports+ | Langevin | W 4–2 | 4,435 | 11–7–2 |
| January 9 | 9:00 pm | at Arizona State | | Mullett Arena • Tempe, Arizona | | Drobac | W 2–1 ^{OT} | 4,995 | 12–7–2 (3–6–2) |
| January 10 | 7:00 pm | at Arizona State | | Mullett Arena • Tempe, Arizona | | Drobac | L 0–1 | 5,025 | 12–8–2 (3–7–2) |
| January 16 | 7:05 pm | Omaha | | Steve Cady Arena • Oxford, Ohio | RESN | Drobac | W 3–0 | 2,083 | 13–8–2 (4–7–2) |
| January 17 | 6:05 pm | Omaha | | Steve Cady Arena • Oxford, Ohio | RESN | Drobac | W 6–2 | 2,407 | 14–8–2 (5–7–2) |
| January 30 | 8:00 pm | at #20 St. Cloud State | | Herb Brooks National Hockey Center • St. Cloud, Minnesota | The CW | Drobac | W 2–1 | 3,257 | 15–8–2 (6–7–2) |
| January 31 | 7:00 pm | at #20 St. Cloud State | | Herb Brooks National Hockey Center • St. Cloud, Minnesota | The CW | Drobac | W 3–1 | 3,469 | 16–8–2 (7–7–2) |
| February 6 | 7:05 pm | #4 Western Michigan | | Steve Cady Arena • Oxford, Ohio | RESN | Drobac | W 3–2 ^{OT} | 3,642 | 17–8–2 (8–7–2) |
| February 7 | 6:05 pm | #4 Western Michigan | | Steve Cady Arena • Oxford, Ohio | RESN | Drobrac | L 1–3 | 3,453 | 17–9–2 (8–8–2) |
| February 13 | 8:07 pm | at #3 North Dakota | #20 | Ralph Engelstad Arena • Grand Forks, North Dakota | Midco Sports | Drobrac | L 0–1 | 11,609 | 17–10–2 (8–9–2) |
| February 14 | 7:07 pm | at #3 North Dakota | #20 | Ralph Engelstad Arena • Grand Forks, North Dakota | Midco Sports | Drobrac | L 3–4 ^{OT} | 11,651 | 17–11–2 (8–10–2) |
| February 20 | 7:05 pm | #9 Minnesota Duluth | #20 | Steve Cady Arena • Oxford, Ohio | RESN | Drobrac | L 2–5 | 2,307 | 17–12–2 (8–11–2) |
| February 21 | 6:05 pm | #9 Minnesota Duluth | #20 | Steve Cady Arena • Oxford, Ohio | RESN | Drobrac | L 1–4 | 3,372 | 17–13–2 (8–12–2) |
| February 27 | 8:00 pm | at Omaha | | Baxter Arena • Omaha, Nebraska | | Drobrac | L 3–5 | 7,194 | 17–14–2 (8–13–2) |
| February 28 | 7:00 pm | at Omaha | | Baxter Arena • Omaha, Nebraska | | Drobrac | W 4–2 | 7,627 | 18–14–2 (9–13–2) |
NCHC Tournament
| March 6 | 9:00 pm | at #7 Denver* | | Magness Arena • Denver, Colorado (NCHC Quarterfinal Game 1) | | Drobrac | L 0–3 | 5,974 | 18–15–2 |
| March 7 | 8:00 pm | at #7 Denver* | | Magness Arena • Denver, Colorado (NCHC Quarterfinal Game 2) | | Drobrac | L 2–6 | 6,550 | 18–16–2 |
*Non-conference game. ^{#}Rankings from USCHO.com Poll. All times are in Eastern Time. Source:

== Scoring statistics ==
Source:

== Rankings ==
Ranking movements Legend: ██ Increase in ranking ██ Decrease in ranking — = Not ranked RV = Received votes
| | Week | | | | | | | | | | | | | | | | | | | | | | | | | | | |
| Poll | Pre | 1 | 2 | 3 | 4 | 5 | 6 | 7 | 8 | 9 | 10 | 11 | 12 | 13 | 14 | 15 | 16 | 17 | 18 | 19 | 20 | 21 | 22 | 23 | 24 | 25 | 26 | Final |
|---|---|---|---|---|---|---|---|---|---|---|---|---|---|---|---|---|---|---|---|---|---|---|---|---|---|---|---|---|
| USCHO.com | — | — | RV | RV | RV | RV | RV | RV | RV | 19 | RV | RV | RV* | RV | RV | RV | RV | RV | RV | 20 | 20 | RV | RV | RV | RV | RV | | |
| USA Hockey | — | — | RV | RV | RV | 20 | RV | RV | RV | 19 | RV | RV | RV* | RV | RV | — | RV | RV | RV | 20 | RV | RV | — | — | — | — | | |

NOTE: USCHO did not relaease a week 12 poll
NOTE: USA Hockey did not relaease a week 12 poll
