= KXRM-TV =

Television station in Colorado Springs, Colorado

- Colorado Springs–Pueblo, Colorado; United States
- City: Colorado Springs, Colorado
- Channels: Digital: 22 (UHF); Virtual: 21
- Branding: Fox 21; Fox 21 News; SOCO CW (21.2)

Programming
- Affiliations: 21.1: Fox; 21.2: The CW (KXTU-LD); for others, see § Subchannels

Ownership
- Owner: Nexstar Media Group; (Nexstar Media Inc.)
- Sister stations: KXTU-LD

History
- First air date: January 22, 1985
- Former channel numbers: Analog: 21 (UHF, 1985–2009)
- Former affiliations: Independent (1985–1986); UPN (secondary, 1995–1999)
- Call sign meaning: "Christ Exalted in the Rocky Mountains"

Technical information
- Licensing authority: FCC
- Facility ID: 35991
- ERP: 51 kW
- HAAT: 641 m (2,103 ft)
- Transmitter coordinates: 38°44′42.9″N 104°51′41.9″W
- Translator(s): see § Translators

Links
- Public license information: Public file; LMS
- Website: www.fox21news.com

KXRM-TV (channel 21) is a television station in Colorado Springs, Colorado, United States, affiliated with the Fox network. It is owned by Nexstar Media Group alongside low-power KXTU-LD (channel 57), an owned-and-operated station of The CW. The two stations share studios on Wooten Road in Colorado Springs; KXRM-TV's transmitter is located on Cheyenne Mountain.

== History ==
KXRM-TV first signed on the air as an independent station on January 22, 1985. Its call letters were chosen in part to reflect the region in which it operates and its original intent of classic family friendly programing, current and classic cartoon programing mixed with Christian teaching and talk shows. The first two letters stand for "Khrist" (Jesus Christ) "Xalted" (Exalted) and the last two letters stand for "Rocky Mountains". The station had hoped to sign on Christmas Eve 1984, but technical glitches prevented that from happening. KXRM was Southern Colorado's first independent station, and the region's first commercial television station since KRDO-TV signed on 31 years earlier. KXRM-TV became one of the initial group of independent television stations to agree to affiliate with the Fox Broadcasting Company in 1986 and had remained an affiliate of the network ever since.

The station was locally owned until 2000 when it was bought by Raycom Media. After Raycom merged with the Liberty Corporation, KXRM was one of several stations that were spun off to Barrington Broadcasting.

On October 11, 2007, the station began airing programming from the Retro Television Network (RTV) on its second digital subchannel. Previously, this aired The Tube (a 24-hour music channel) until the network suspended operations on October 1. On September 15, 2008, KXRM replaced RTV programming on 21.2 with a simulcast of KXTU. This signal increases KXTU's broadcasting radius; KXTU did not convert to digital until 2010, and even in digital, its coverage area is effectively limited to El Paso and Pueblo counties.

On February 28, 2013, Barrington Broadcasting announced the sale of its entire group, including KXRM-TV, to Sinclair Broadcast Group. The sale was completed on November 25. On August 20, 2014, Sinclair announced that it would sell KXRM-TV and KXTU-LD, along with WTTA in Tampa Bay and WHTM in Harrisburg (which Sinclair, on behalf of Allbritton, was planning on to divest) to Media General in a swap for WJAR in Providence, Rhode Island, the WLUK-TV and WCWF duopoly in Green Bay, Wisconsin, and WTGS in Savannah, Georgia. The swap was part of Media General's merger with LIN Media. WHTM's sale of Media General was explored nearly two months earlier, and it was completed, nearly three months before the Media General/LIN deal was completed. The sale was completed on December 19. On January 27, 2016, it was announced that the Nexstar Broadcasting Group would buy Media General for $4.6 billion. KXRM became part of "Nexstar Media Group" as Nexstar's second station in Colorado, joining Grand Junction's CBS affiliate KREX-TV, along with their sister Fox station KFQX through their JSA with Mission Broadcasting. The deal was approved by the FCC on January 11, 2017, and it was completed on January 17. Nexstar would then acquire Tribune Media and their Denver duopoly of CW affiliate KWGN-TV and Fox affiliate KDVR, thus consolidating full control over the Fox stations across Colorado.

== News operation ==
Currently, KXRM broadcasts 43 hours of local news each week (with 7 1/2 hours each weekday, 2 1/2 hours on Saturdays and three hours on Sundays). It has the highest local newscast output among all broadcast television stations in the Colorado Springs–Pueblo market.

The station began airing a half hour prime time newscast at 9 p.m. on March 11, 2001, that was produced by local CBS affiliate KKTV. KXRM established its own in-house news department in 2006 and expanded the nightly 9 p.m. newscast to a full hour. The station hosts a morning show (first started in 2007 as a three-hour newscast) that currently runs from 5 to 9 a.m. that has been recognized by the Colorado Broadcasters Association as one of the best morning shows in the market. On January 20, 2016, a 10 p.m. newscast was added for weeknights. KXRM also airs weekend morning newscasts running from 5 to 7 a.m. on Saturdays and 6 to 8 a.m. on Sundays. The Saturday evening newscasts run a half hour from 9 to 9:30 p.m., and the Sunday night newscasts run an hour from 9 to 10 p.m.

In late September 2010, KXRM became the fourth station in Colorado Springs–Pueblo to start broadcasting its local newscasts in 16:9 widescreen.

In 2013, the Radio Television Digital News Association recognized KXRM with a National Edward R. Murrow Award for continuing coverage of the Waldo Canyon Fire.

== Technical information ==
=== Subchannels ===
The station's signal is multiplexed:

Subchannels of KXRM-TV
Subchannel	Res.	Short name	Programming
21.1	720p	KXRM-DT	Fox
21.2	1080i	SOCO CW	The CW (KXTU-LD)
21.3	480i	ION	Quest
21.4	480i	Mystery	Antenna TV

Simulcast of subchannels of another station

=== Analog-to-digital conversion ===
KXRM-TV ended regular programming on its analog signal, over UHF channel 21, on June 12, 2009, the official date on which full-power television stations in the United States transitioned from analog to digital broadcasts under federal mandate. The station's digital signal remained on its pre-transition UHF channel 22, using virtual channel 21.

As part of the SAFER Act, KXRM kept its analog signal on the air until June 26 to inform viewers of the digital television transition through a loop of public service announcements from the National Association of Broadcasters.

== Translators ==
- K32MD-D Cheyenne Wells
- K15KG-D Eads, etc.
- K18JX-D Hoehne
- K28GE-D Woodland Park
