= 2025–26 Mercyhurst Lakers men's ice hockey season =

- Conference: 10th AHA
- Home ice: Mercyhurst Ice Center

Rankings
- USCHO: NR
- USA Hockey: NR

Record
- Overall: 6–28–3
- Conference: 15–18–3
- Home: 3–13–1
- Road: 3–15–2

Coaches and captains
- Head coach: Rick Gotkin
- Assistant coaches: Tom Peffall; Kārlis Zirnis
- Captain: Barrett Brooks
- Alternate captain(s): Ryan Coughlin; Caleb Price; Trent Sambrook

The 2025–26 Mercyhurst Lakers men's ice hockey season was the 39th and final season of play for the program, the 27th at the Division I level, and the 2nd in Atlantic Hockey America. The Lakers represented Mercyhurst University in the 2025–26 NCAA Division I men's ice hockey season, played their home games at the Mercyhurst Ice Center and were coached by Rick Gotkin in his 38th and final season.

== Season ==
At the end of the previous season, Rick Gotkin announced that this would be his final year as head coach for Mercyhurst. A little over a month later, assistant coach Tom Peffall was selected as his replacement.

Mercyhurst kicked its season off with a visit to Michigan. While the Wolverines were heavily favored, the results turned about worse that the Lakers could have hoped. Mercyhurst was throttled in the series, being outscored 1–18. To make matters worse, the embarrassing losses presaged how the first half of the season would proceed. The Lakers lost their first fourteen games of the season with both the offense and defense playing poorly. Charles-Edward Gravel, who had assumed control of the Mercyhurst net after Michael Chambre returned to the junior level, did not give the Lakers too many chances to win during the first two months of the year. However, even when he did play a decent game, the team was unable to take advantage. When the Lakers paused for the winter break, they were well on their way to posting one of the worst seasons in the history of college hockey, averaging 1.38 goals per game while allowing 4.63 goals against.

After going winless in the first half of the season, Mercyhurst opened the second have against #4 North Dakota. The Hawks skated rings around the Lakers, outshooting them 46–8 in the first game. However, unlike their earlier series with Michigan, the team was kept in the match with a spectacular performance in goal. Gravel, who was playing his first season in college, had grown accustomed to a heavy workload over the trying first half and stopped 44 shots in the game. Gravel's improved play continued over the succeeding weeks with him backstopping the team to a pair of shutout victories. The second half also saw Salvatore Evola make his first starts of the season with the senior transfer taking some of the pressure off his younger counterpart. Evola provided the Lakers with three more wins in the second half, surpassing their total from '25. While the victories were a welcome change, they were too few in number to stop the Lakers from finishing the season last in both the conference standings and the national rankings.

The Lakers began the postseason by heading to Buffalo to take on Canisius. In a familiar circumstance, Mercyhurst was outshot by a wide margin, 49–13. However, Gravel's effort in goal stopped all but two chances and gave the Lakers a chance to win. Mercyhurst made the most of their few opportunities and scored three times in the first 40 minutes to take a 2-goal lead into the third. After the Griffins closed the gap midway through the final frame, Gravel shut the door in the final 9 minutes and forced Canisius to pull their goaltender. Two empty-netters later, Mercyhurst skated away with a victory. Continuing the same plan in the Quarterfinal round, Mercyhurst was able to score three goals on just 19 shots while Gravel turned in another herculean performance. The game went into overtime and Gravel remained besieged by Bentley, who finished the match with a shot advantage of 69–26. Unfortunagely, Gravel could not hold out forever and he surrendered the winning goal seven minutes into the third overtime. Gravel, tired from standing on his head for two games, was given the night off for the rematch. Evola was unable to live up to the high level of play and surrendered 6 goals in the season's final game.

Three weeks after the end of the season, Mercyhurst announced that it would be ending its men's ice hockey program, making this the final year of varsity play.

== Departures ==
Player	Position	Nationality	Cause
Steven Agriogianis	Forward	United States	Graduation (retired)
Tommy Bannister	Forward	United States	Transferred to Oswego State
Jake Beaune	Defenseman	United States	Graduation (retired)
Mickey Burns	Forward	United States	Graduation (signed with Atlanta Gladiators)
Michael Chambre	Goaltender	United States	Returned to juniors (Waterloo Black Hawks)
Davis Fry	Forward	Canada	Transferred to Calgary
Dustin Geregach	Defenseman	United States	Graduation (signed with Greenville Swamp Rabbits)
Kyler Head	Forward	United States	Graduation (signed with Fayetteville Marksmen)
Will Margel	Forward	United States	Graduation (retired)
Carter McPhail	Goaltender	United States	Graduation (signed with Athens Rock Lobsters)
Mateo Picozzi	Defenseman	United States	Transferred to Arizona
Cameron Ricotta	Forward	United States	Transferred to Geneseo State
Boris Skalos	Forward	United States	Transferred to RIT

== Recruiting ==
Player	Position	Nationality	Age	Notes
Alexander Dimitriadis	Forward	Canada	21	Richmond Hill, ON
Salvatore Evola	Goaltender	United States	24	Rochester, MI; transfer from Bowling Green
Cameron Glance	Defenseman	United States	21	Moon Township, PA; transfer from club team mid-season
Charles-Edward Gravel	Goaltender	Canada	21	Lévis, QC
Tyler Haskins	Forward	United States	22	Rochester, MN; transfer from Minnesota State
Franky Iasenza	Defenseman	Canada	21	Pointe-Claire, QC
Lukas Klemm	Defenseman	United States	21	Ridgefield, CT
John Larkin	Defenseman	United States	24	Detroit, MI; transfer from Ohio State
Andrew LeBlanc	Forward	Canada	21	George Town, CYM
Jacob LeBlanc	Defenseman	Canada	21	George Town, CYM
Will Schumacher	Forward	United States	21	Prior Lake, MN
Noah Sedore	Forward	Canada	23	Bobcaygeon, ON; transfer from Prince Edward Island
Joseph Serpa	Forward	Canada	23	Cambridge, ON; transfer from Dalhousie

== Roster ==
As of September 3, 2025.

No.	Nat.	Player	Class	Pos	Height	Weight	DoB	Hometown	Previous team	NHL rights
1	(United States)	Michael Chambre	Sophomore	G	6' 1" (1.85 m)	170 lb (77 kg)	2005-01-07	Fort Myers, Florida	Sioux Falls Stampede (USHL)	—
2	(United States)	Lukas Klemm	Freshman	D	6' 2" (1.88 m)	194 lb (88 kg)	2004-04-20	Ridgefield, Connecticut	Johnstown Tomahawks (NAHL)	—
3	(United States)	John Larkin	Senior	D	6' 2" (1.88 m)	190 lb (86 kg)	2001-01-26	Northville, Michigan	Ohio State (Big Ten)	—
4	(Canada)	Jaryd Sych	Junior	D	6' 2" (1.88 m)	194 lb (88 kg)	2003-02-10	Airdrie, Alberta	Notre Dame Hounds (SJHL)	—
5	(United States)	Caleb Price (A)	Graduate	D	5' 10" (1.78 m)	170 lb (77 kg)	2000-03-31	Hooksett, New Hampshire	Lindenwood (NCAA)	—
6	(United States)	Trent Sambrook (A)	Junior	D	5' 9" (1.75 m)	165 lb (75 kg)	2002-01-03	Winnipeg, Manitoba	Winkler Flyers (MJHL)	—
7	(United States)	Tyler DesRochers	Junior	D	6' 0" (1.83 m)	185 lb (84 kg)	2003-04-02	Howell, New Jersey	Johnstown Tomahawks (NAHL)	—
8	(United States)	Brendan Lamb	Sophomore	F	5' 11" (1.8 m)	176 lb (80 kg)	2004-05-14	Battle Creek, Michigan	Madison Capitols (USHL)	—
9	(Canada)	Sean James	Junior	F	6' 0" (1.83 m)	161 lb (73 kg)	2002-09-10	Almonte, Ontario	Smiths Falls Bears (CCHL)	—
10	(United States)	Franky Iasenza	Freshman	D	6' 1" (1.85 m)	201 lb (91 kg)	2004-07-11	Pointe-Claire, Quebec	Victoriaville Tigres (QMJHL)	—
11	(United States)	Barrett Brooks (C)	Senior	F	5' 8" (1.73 m)	170 lb (77 kg)	2001-12-19	Stevens Point, Wisconsin	Western Michigan (NCHC)	—
13	(United States)	Cameron Glance	Senior	D			2004-07-08	Moon Township, Pennsylvania	Mercyhurst (ACHA)	—
14	(Canada)	Andrew LeBlanc	Freshman	F	6' 0" (1.83 m)	183 lb (83 kg)	2004-06-03	George Town, Cayman Islands	North Bay Battalion (OHL)	—
15	(Czech Republic)	Dominik Bartecko	Sophomore	F	5' 9" (1.75 m)	170 lb (77 kg)	2003-12-09	Prague, Czech Republic	New Jersey Titans (NAHL)	—
16	(United States)	Ryan Coughlin (A)	Senior	F	6' 0" (1.83 m)	180 lb (82 kg)	2001-02-09	Charlotte, North Carolina	New Jersey Titans (NAHL)	—
18	(Canada)	Jacob LeBlanc	Freshman	F	6' 1" (1.85 m)	187 lb (85 kg)	2004-06-03	George Town, Cayman Islands	North Bay Battalion (OHL)	—
19	(United States)	Riley Fitzgerald	Sophomore	F	5' 9" (1.75 m)	161 lb (73 kg)	2003-06-02	Wilmington, Massachusetts	New Jersey Titans (NAHL)	—
20	(United States)	Kaden Muir	Sophomore	D	6' 2" (1.88 m)	190 lb (86 kg)	2004-05-09	Manchester, New Hampshire	Austin Bruins (NAHL)	—
21	(United States)	Will Schumacher	Freshman	F	6' 0" (1.83 m)	181 lb (82 kg)	2004-05-04	Prior Lake, Minnesota	Victoria Grizzlies (BCHL)	—
22	(Canada)	Noah Sedore	Junior	F	5' 9" (1.75 m)	168 lb (76 kg)	2002-02-24	Bobcaygeon, Ontario	Prince Edward Island (AUS)	—
23	(United States)	Christian Kocsis	Sophomore	F	5' 10" (1.78 m)	170 lb (77 kg)	2004-06-09	Middletown, New Jersey	Omaha Lancers (USHL)	—
24	(Canada)	Matteo Disipio	Sophomore	F	5' 11" (1.8 m)	161 lb (73 kg)	2003-07-26	Nepean, Ontario	Rochester Jr. Americans (NAHL)	—
26	(Canada)	Spencer Smith	Junior	F	5' 8" (1.73 m)	174 lb (79 kg)	2002-05-20	St. Catharines, Ontario	Penticton Vees (BCHL)	—
27	(Canada)	Alex Dimitriadis	Freshman	F	5' 10" (1.78 m)	181 lb (82 kg)	2004-08-06	Richmond Hill, Ontario	Sherwood Park Crusaders (BCHL)	—
28	(United States)	Tyler Nasca	Senior	D	5' 11" (1.8 m)	160 lb (73 kg)	2001-01-09	Buffalo, New York	Lone Star Brahmas (NAHL)	—
29	(Canada)	Charles-Edward Gravel	Freshman	G	6' 1" (1.85 m)	194 lb (88 kg)	2004-05-23	Lévis, Quebec	Prince George Spruce Kings (BCHL)	—
33	(United States)	Salvatore Evola	Senior	G	6' 0" (1.83 m)	175 lb (79 kg)	2001-04-24	Rochester, Michigan	Bowling Green (CCHA)	—
34	(Canada)	Joey Serpa	Junior	F	6' 0" (1.83 m)	165 lb (75 kg)	2002-03-23	Cambridge, Ontario	Dalhousie (AUS)	—
37	(United States)	Connor Pelc	Junior	F	6' 2" (1.88 m)	194 lb (88 kg)	2003-04-28	Buffalo, New York	Sioux Falls Stampede (USHL)	—
43	(United States)	Tyler Haskins	Senior	F	6' 1" (1.85 m)	170 lb (77 kg)	2003-07-07	Rochester, Minnesota	Minnesota State (CCHA)	—
44	(Canada)	Simon Bucheler	Sophomore	G	6' 2" (1.88 m)	188 lb (85 kg)	2002-03-29	Saint-Laurent, Quebec	Shreveport Mudbugs (NAHL)	—

== Standings ==
2025–26 Atlantic Hockey America Standings
	Conference record										Overall record					
	GP	W	L	T	OW	OL	SW	PTS	GF	GA	GP	W	L	T	GF	GA
#20 Bentley †*	26	16	6	4	1	0	2	53	85	56	40	23	12	5	122	94
Sacred Heart	26	15	8	3	1	0	1	48	80	61	40	23	14	3	118	96
Robert Morris	26	13	11	2	0	2	2	45	69	69	40	16	21	3	103	128
Holy Cross	26	14	10	2	1	1	1	45	81	69	38	18	18	2	113	116
RIT	26	13	11	2	2	1	2	42	69	68	36	17	17	2	93	96
Air Force	26	13	10	3	2	1	0	41	75	73	37	18	15	4	108	112
Canisius	26	12	12	2	1	0	2	39	81	74	35	17	16	2	107	105
Niagara	26	9	16	1	1	3	0	30	67	83	37	13	23	1	93	118
Army	26	7	15	4	2	3	2	28	61	75	35	12	17	6	91	96
Mercyhurst	26	5	18	3	0	0	1	19	47	87	37	6	28	3	65	143
Championship: March 21, 2026 † indicates conference regular season champion (DeGregorio Trophy) * indicates conference tournament champion (Riley Trophy); Rankings: USCHO.com Top 20 Poll; updated April 15, 2026; Source: AHA

== Schedule and results ==
Date	Time	Opponent^{#}	Rank^{#}	Site	TV	Decision	Result	Attendance	Record
Regular Season
October 3	7:00 pm	at #12 Michigan*		Yost Ice Arena • Ann Arbor, Michigan	B1G+	Chambre	L 1–11	5,228	0–1–0
October 4	7:00 pm	at #12 Michigan*		Yost Ice Arena • Ann Arbor, Michigan	B1G+	Gravel	L 0–7	5,015	0–2–0
October 10	7:00 pm	Union*		Mercyhurst Ice Center • Erie, Pennsylvania	FloHockey	Gravel	L 2–5	876	0–3–0
October 11	5:00 pm	Union*		Mercyhurst Ice Center • Erie, Pennsylvania	FloHockey	Chambre	L 3–5	509	0–4–0
October 18	5:00 pm	Holy Cross		Mercyhurst Ice Center • Erie, Pennsylvania	FloHockey	Gravel	L 0–4	212	0–5–0 (0–1–0)
October 24	7:00 pm	Massachusetts Lowell*		Mercyhurst Ice Center • Erie, Pennsylvania	FloHockey	Chambre	L 0–4	609	0–6–0
October 25	5:00 pm	Massachusetts Lowell*		Mercyhurst Ice Center • Erie, Pennsylvania	FloHockey	Gravel	L 3–4	207	0–7–0
October 31	7:00 pm	Bentley		Mercyhurst Ice Center • Erie, Pennsylvania	FloHockey	Gravel	L 1–3	759	0–8–0 (0–2–0)
November 1	5:00 pm	Bentley		Mercyhurst Ice Center • Erie, Pennsylvania	FloHockey	Gravel	L 2–7	699	0–9–0 (0–3–0)
November 7	7:00 pm	at RIT		Gene Polisseni Center • Henrietta, New York	FloHockey	Gravel	L 1–4	2,977	0–10–0 (0–4–0)
November 8	5:00 pm	at RIT		Gene Polisseni Center • Henrietta, New York	FloHockey	Gravel	L 2–3	3,407	0–11–0 (0–5–0)
November 21	7:00 pm	at Canisius		LECOM Harborcenter • Buffalo, New York	FloHockey	Gravel	L 3–4	675	0–12–0 (0–6–0)
November 22	7:00 pm	at Canisius		LECOM Harborcenter • Buffalo, New York	FloHockey	Gravel	L 1–5	967	0–13–0 (0–7–0)
November 28	7:00 pm	Robert Morris		Mercyhurst Ice Center • Erie, Pennsylvania	FloHockey	Gravel	L 1–3	326	0–14–0 (0–8–0)
November 29	7:00 pm	at Robert Morris		Clearview Arena • Neville Township, Pennsylvania	FloHockey	Gravel	T 1–1 ^{SOL}	412	0–14–1 (0–8–1)
December 6	2:00 pm	at Holy Cross		Hart Center • Worcester, Massachusetts	FloHockey	Gravel	L 1–4	692	0–15–1 (0–9–1)
January 2	8:07 pm	at #4 North Dakota*		Ralph Engelstad Arena • Grand Forks, North Dakota	Midco	Gravel	L 0–2	11,571	0–16–1
January 3	7:07 pm	at #4 North Dakota*		Ralph Engelstad Arena • Grand Forks, North Dakota	Midco	Evola	L 1–6	11,586	0–17–1
January 9	7:00 pm	Army		Mercyhurst Ice Center • Erie, Pennsylvania	FloHockey	Gravel	W 3–0	897	1–17–1 (1–9–1)
January 10	5:00 pm	Army		Mercyhurst Ice Center • Erie, Pennsylvania	FloHockey	Gravel	L 0–5	706	1–18–1 (1–10–1)
January 16	7:00 pm	Niagara		Mercyhurst Ice Center • Erie, Pennsylvania	FloHockey	Gravel	W 3–0	894	2–18–1 (2–10–1)
January 17	6:00 pm	at Niagara		Dwyer Arena • Lewiston, New York	FloHockey	Evola	W 4–2	270	3–18–1 (3–10–1)
January 23	7:00 pm	Canisius		Mercyhurst Ice Center • Erie, Pennsylvania	FloHockey	Gravel	L 3–4	908	3–19–1 (3–11–1)
January 24	5:00 pm	Canisius		Mercyhurst Ice Center • Erie, Pennsylvania	FloHockey	Gravel	L 0–5	902	3–20–1 (3–12–1)
January 30	7:00 pm	RIT		Mercyhurst Ice Center • Erie, Pennsylvania	FloHockey	Gravel	T 2–2 ^{SOL}	985	3–20–2 (3–12–2)
January 31	5:00 pm	RIT		Mercyhurst Ice Center • Erie, Pennsylvania	FloHockey	Gravel	L 1–3	943	3–21–2 (3–13–2)
February 6	7:00 pm	at Sacred Heart		Martire Family Arena • Fairfield, Connecticut	FloHockey	Gravel	L 1–5	2,316	3–22–2 (3–14–2)
February 7	3:00 pm	at Sacred Heart		Martire Family Arena • Fairfield, Connecticut	FloHockey	Evola	W 2–1	3,427	4–22–2 (4–14–2)
February 13	9:05 pm	at Air Force		Cadet Ice Arena • Air Force Academy, Colorado	FloHockey	Evola	T 3–3 ^{SOW}	2,468	4–22–3 (4–14–3)
February 14	7:05 pm	at Air Force		Cadet Ice Arena • Air Force Academy, Colorado	FloHockey	Evola	L 4–5	2,238	4–23–3 (4–15–3)
February 20	6:00 pm	at Niagara		Mercyhurst Ice Center • Erie, Pennsylvania	FloHockey	Evola	W 3–2	853	5–23–3 (5–15–3)
February 21	7:00 pm	at Niagara		Dwyer Arena • Lewiston, New York	FloHockey	Gravel	L 1–3	846	5–24–3 (5–16–3)
February 27	7:00 pm	at Robert Morris		Clearview Arena • Neville Township, Pennsylvania	FloHockey	Evola	L 3–5	814	5–25–3 (5–17–3)
February 28	7:00 pm	Robert Morris		Mercyhurst Ice Center • Erie, Pennsylvania	FloHockey	Evola	L 3–5	974	5–26–3 (5–18–3)
Atlantic Hockey America Tournament
March 3	6:00 pm	at Canisius*		LECOM Harborcenter • Buffalo, New York (AHA First Round)	FloHockey	Gravel	W 5–2	452	6–26–3
March 6	7:00 pm	at Bentley*		Bentley Arena • Waltham, Massachusetts (AHA Quarterfinal Game 1)	FloHockey	Gravel	L 3–4 ^{3OT}	1,184	6–27–3
March 7	6:00 pm	at Bentley*		Bentley Arena • Waltham, Massachusetts (AHA Quarterfinal Game 2)	FloHockey	Evola	L 0–6	1,110	6–28–3
*Non-conference game. ^{#}Rankings from USCHO.com Poll. All times are in Eastern Time. Source:

== Scoring statistics ==
Name	Position	Games	Goals	Assists	Points	PIM
Dominik Bartecko	F	36	8	9	17	22
Jacob LeBlanc	D	36	1	15	16	34
Sean James	LW	30	7	7	14	12
Will Schumacher	F	20	8	5	13	17
Ryan Coughlin	F	37	5	8	13	2
Brendan Lamb	F	36	7	5	12	10
Christian Kocsis	LW	37	6	5	11	8
Andrew LeBlanc	C	25	4	7	11	22
Tyler DesRochers	D	34	2	6	8	20
Lukas Klemm	D	29	1	7	8	10
Riley Fitzgerald	F	20	4	2	6	29
Franky Iasenza	D	29	1	5	6	22
John Larkin	D	36	1	5	6	32
Alexander Dimitriadis	F	28	3	2	5	8
Barrett Brooks	RW	34	3	1	4	8
Matteo Disipio	RW	34	1	3	4	0
Trent Sambrook	D	21	0	4	4	2
Caleb Price	D	29	0	4	4	8
Spencer Smith	C	14	1	2	3	2
Connor Pelc	RW	21	1	2	3	20
Noah Sedore	LW	16	0	2	2	14
Tyler Nasca	D	25	1	0	1	6
Salvatore Evola	G	10	0	1	1	0
Cameron Glance	D	2	0	0	0	0
Michael Chambre	G	3	0	0	0	0
Tyler Haskins	F	5	0	0	0	2
Kaden Muir	D	25	0	0	0	32
Charles-Edward Gravel	G	26	0	0	0	4
Jaryd Sych	D	27	0	0	0	19
Total			65	107	172	371

== Goaltending statistics ==
Name	Games	Minutes	Wins	Losses	Ties	Goals against	Saves	Shut-outs	SV %	GAA
Charles-Edward Gravel	27	1529:33	3	21	2	82	802	2	.907	3.22
Salvatore Evola	12	546:24	3	4	1	33	318	0	.906	3.62
Michael Chambre	4	177:41	0	3	0	18	109	0	.858	6.08
Empty Net	-	28:05	-	-	-	10	-	-	-	-
Total	37	2281:43	6	28	3	143	1229	2	.896	3.76

== Rankings ==
Poll	Week																											
Poll	Pre	1	2	3	4	5	6	7	8	9	10	11	12	13	14	15	16	17	18	19	20	21	22	23	24	25	26	27 (Final)
USCHO.com	NR	NR	NR	NR	NR	NR	NR	NR	NR	NR	NR	NR	–	NR	NR	NR	NR	NR	NR	NR	NR	NR	NR	NR	NR	NR	NR	NR
USA Hockey	NR	NR	NR	NR	NR	NR	NR	NR	NR	NR	NR	NR	–	NR	NR	NR	NR	NR	NR	NR	NR	NR	NR	NR	NR	NR	NR	NR

Note: USCHO did not release a poll in week 12.
Note: USA Hockey did not release a poll in week 12.
