= 2025–26 Holy Cross Crusaders men's ice hockey season =

- Conference: T–3rd AHA
- Home ice: Hart Center

Rankings
- USCHO: NR
- USA Hockey: NR

Record
- Overall: 18–18–2
- Conference: 14–10–2
- Home: 12–6–1
- Road: 6–12–1

Coaches and captains
- Head coach: Bill Riga
- Assistant coaches: Drew Michals; Connor Mauro; Kellen Jones
- Captain(s): Devin Phillips; Jack Seymour
- Alternate captain(s): Matt DeBoer; Mack Oliphant

The 2025–26 Holy Cross Crusaders men's ice hockey season was the 60th season of play for the program, the 28th at the Division I level and the 2nd in Atlantic Hockey America. The Crusaders represented the College of the Holy Cross in the 2025–26 NCAA Division I men's ice hockey season, played their home games at the Hart Center and were coached by Bill Riga in his 5th season.

== Season ==
After the departure of the best player in program history (Liam McLinskey) as well as the team's starting goaltender, Holy Cross was all but guaranteed to take a step back this season. Louden Hogg got a turn as the starter early in the year but his appearances largely resulted in missed opportunities. The two incoming netminders both fell flat in their first outings but came around during their second appearances. By November, Connor Mackenzie and Danick Leroux were rotating starts and the team appeared to right itself, going nine games without a loss. The veteran lineup was able to take advantage of the opportunities they received once the Crusaders got a stretch of competent goaltending. Jack Stockfish quickly established himself as the offensive leader and, though he could not replicate the numbers McLinskey put up, he was nonetheless able to keep Holy Cross competitive in most of its matches.

After new year's, the team entered a skid that saw them win just once over an 8-game span. During that time, Leroux took over as the primary netminder but it was the lack of depth scoring that proved to be the Crusaders' downfall. The team was able to pull out of its tailspin by the end of January but they could only manage an even record over the final month of the regular season. The losses ended any chance of Holy Cross defending its conference title but they were just able to hold on to a home stand for the quarterfinal round.

RIT proved to be a tough out for Holy Cross, pushing the Crusaders to the brink in two overtime games. Fortunately, Stockfish came through in the clutch and had a hand in both winning goals. Holy Cross ten took on the league champions, Bentley, and were nearly able to pull off an upset in the first game. Twice leading in the third period, the Crusaders saw their hopes dashed when the Falcons netted the winning goal in the latter stages of the first overtime. Unfortunately, three consecutive overtime games proved a bit too much for the Crusaders and they were unable to conjure up any scoring in the rematch and their season came to a close.

== Departures ==
Player	Position	Nationality	Cause
Thomas Gale	Goaltender	Canada	Graduation (signed with Wheeling Nailers)
John Gelatt	Forward	United States	Graduation (signed with Utah Grizzlies)
Michael Hodge	Forward	Canada	Graduation (signed with EC Lauterbach 2012)
Malachi Klassen	Goaltender	Canada	Left program (retired)
Liam McLinskey	Forward	United States	Graduation (signed with Charlotte Checkers)
Edward Moskowitz	Forward	Canada	Transferred to Middlebury
Nic Petruolo	Defenseman	United States	Graduation (retired)
Mathew Shatsky	Defenseman	Canada	Graduation (retired)

== Recruiting ==
Player	Position	Nationality	Age	Notes
Anthony Biakabutuka	Defenseman	Canada	19	Longueuil, QC
Anthony Carone	Forward	United States	22	Pittsburgh, PA; joined mid-season
Noah Eyre	Forward	United States	21	Vienna, VA; transfer from Quinnipiac
David Hymovitch	Forward	United States	22	Phoenix, AZ; transfer from Arizona State
Owain Johnston	Defenseman	Canada	21	Toronto, ON; transfer from St. Francis Xavier
Danick Leroux	Goaltender	Canada	20	Candiac, QC
Connor Mackenzie	Goaltender	Canada	23	Toronto, ON; transfer from Vermont
Quinn McCall	Defenseman	United States	20	St. John, IN
Will Reardon	Forward	United States	21	Philadelphia, PA
Dax Williams	Defenseman	Canada	20	Calgary, AB

== Roster ==
As of August 11, 2025.

No.	Nat.	Player	Class	Pos	Height	Weight	DoB	Hometown	Previous team	NHL rights
1	(United States)	Louden Hogg	Senior	G	5' 11" (1.8 m)	160 lb (73 kg)	2002-10-18	Cheyenne, Wyoming	Fargo Force (USHL)	—
2	(United States)	Lachlan Getz	Senior	D	6' 3" (1.91 m)	190 lb (86 kg)	2002-02-01	Northfield, Illinois	Michigan Tech (CCHA)	—
3	(Canada)	Brody Gagno	Junior	D	6' 1" (1.85 m)	190 lb (86 kg)	2002-07-29	South Surrey, British Columbia	Surrey Eagles (BCHL)	—
4	(Canada)	Anthony Biakabutuka	Freshman	D	6' 3" (1.91 m)	194 lb (88 kg)	2006-06-20	Longueuil, Quebec	Nanaimo Clippers (BCHL)	—
5	(United States)	Will Troutwine	Junior	D	6' 3" (1.91 m)	215 lb (98 kg)	2002-06-23	Eveleth, Minnesota	Janesville Jets (NAHL)	—
6	(United States)	Timothy Heinke	Senior	F	6' 1" (1.85 m)	194 lb (88 kg)	2001-10-02	Kensington, Connecticut	Quinnipiac (ECAC)	—
7	(United States)	Anthony Carone	Freshman (RS)	F	6' 1" (1.85 m)	183 lb (83 kg)	2003-07-30	Pittsburgh, Pennsylvania	Victoria Grizzlies (BCHL)	—
8	(United States)	Ryan Buckley	Sophomore	D	6' 1" (1.85 m)	179 lb (81 kg)	2004-01-06	Warwick, Rhode Island	Alberni Valley Bulldogs (BCHL)	—
10	(United States)	David Hymovitch	Junior	F	5' 11" (1.8 m)	181 lb (82 kg)	2003-08-14	Phoenix, Arizona	Arizona State (NCHC)	—
11	(Canada)	Michael Abgrall	Senior	F	5' 11" (1.8 m)	172 lb (78 kg)	2003-10-25	Richmond, British Columbia	Omaha (NCHC)	—
12	(United States)	Matt Kursonis	Sophomore	F	6' 1" (1.85 m)	187 lb (85 kg)	2004-03-05	Worcester, Massachusetts	Alberni Valley Bulldogs (BCHL)	—
13	(United States)	Will Elias	Junior	D	6' 0" (1.83 m)	180 lb (82 kg)	2003-01-28	Weston, Massachusetts	Cowichan Valley Capitals (BCHL)	—
14	(Canada)	Owain Johnston	Sophomore	D	6' 1" (1.85 m)	194 lb (88 kg)	2003-10-19	Toronto, Ontario	St. Francis Xavier (AUS)	—
15	(Canada)	Jarrod Smith	Sophomore	F	5' 10" (1.78 m)	165 lb (75 kg)	2004-01-22	West Vancouver, British Columbia	Cranbrook Bucks (BCHL)	—
17	(United States)	Matt DeBoer (A)	Senior	F	6' 0" (1.83 m)	185 lb (84 kg)	2002-09-02	Las Vegas, Nevada	Green Bay Gamblers (USHL)	—
18	(Canada)	Ty Gagno	Junior	F	6' 2" (1.88 m)	185 lb (84 kg)	2003-10-01	Langley, British Columbia	Prince George Spruce Kings (BCHL)	—
19	(Canada)	Jack Stockfish	Junior	F	6' 4" (1.93 m)	215 lb (98 kg)	2002-09-30	North Bay, Ontario	Prince George Spruce Kings (BCHL)	—
20	(United States)	Devin Phillips (C)	Senior	F	5' 9" (1.75 m)	170 lb (77 kg)	2001-07-12	Raleigh, North Carolina	Brooks Bandits (AJHL)	—
21	(Canada)	Owen Kim	Sophomore	F	5' 8" (1.73 m)	161 lb (73 kg)	2004-05-02	North Vancouver, British Columbia	Vernon Vipers (BCHL)	—
23	(Canada)	Ben LeFranc	Sophomore	F	5' 9" (1.75 m)	176 lb (80 kg)	2003-08-14	Penticton, British Columbia	Prince George Spruce Kings (BCHL)	—
24	(United States)	Dax Williams	Freshman	D	6' 0" (1.83 m)	201 lb (91 kg)	2005-09-28	Calgary, Alberta	Calgary Hitmen (WHL)	—
26	(United States)	Will Reardon	Freshman	F	6' 6" (1.98 m)	216 lb (98 kg)	2004-03-05	Philadelphia, Pennsylvania	Corpus Christi IceRays (NAHL)	—
27	(United States)	Mack Oliphant (A)	Senior	D	6' 3" (1.91 m)	195 lb (88 kg)	2002-12-28	Northbrook, Illinois	Johnstown Tomahawks (NAHL)	—
28	(Canada)	Jack Seymour (C)	Senior	F	5' 11" (1.8 m)	160 lb (73 kg)	2001-04-06	Chelsea, Quebec	Chilliwack Chiefs (BCHL)	—
29	(United States)	Conner Welsh	Junior	F	5' 11" (1.8 m)	175 lb (79 kg)	2004-01-02	Greenwich, Connecticut	Vernon Vipers (BCHL)	—
30	(Canada)	Danick Leroux	Freshman	G	6' 2" (1.88 m)	201 lb (91 kg)	2005-09-02	Candiac, Quebec	Rochester Jr. Americans (NAHL)	—
33	(Canada)	Connor MacKenzie	Junior	G	6' 0" (1.83 m)	165 lb (75 kg)	2002-05-10	Toronto, Ontario	Vermont (HEA)	—
34	(United States)	Joe Solimine	Senior	F	5' 8" (1.73 m)	165 lb (75 kg)	2002-03-03	Middleton, Massachusetts	Boston Junior Bruins (NCDC)	—
37	(United States)	Quinn McCall	Freshman	D	5' 11" (1.8 m)	181 lb (82 kg)	2005-01-12	St. John, Indiana	Erie Otters (OHL)	—
38	(United States)	Noah Eyre	Sophomore	F	5' 11" (1.8 m)	176 lb (80 kg)	2004-06-22	Vienna, Virginia	Quinnipiac (ECAC)	—

== Standings ==
2025–26 Atlantic Hockey America Standings
	Conference record										Overall record					
	GP	W	L	T	OW	OL	SW	PTS	GF	GA	GP	W	L	T	GF	GA
#20 Bentley †*	26	16	6	4	1	0	2	53	85	56	39	23	11	5	122	89
Sacred Heart	26	15	8	3	1	0	1	48	80	61	40	23	14	3	118	96
Robert Morris	26	13	11	2	0	2	2	45	69	69	40	16	21	3	103	128
Holy Cross	26	14	10	2	1	1	1	45	81	69	38	18	18	2	113	116
RIT	26	13	11	2	2	1	2	42	69	68	36	17	17	2	93	96
Air Force	26	13	10	3	2	1	0	41	75	73	37	18	15	4	108	112
Canisius	26	12	12	2	1	0	2	39	81	74	35	17	16	2	107	105
Niagara	26	9	16	1	1	3	0	30	67	83	37	13	23	1	93	118
Army	26	7	15	4	2	3	2	28	61	75	35	12	17	6	91	96
Mercyhurst	26	5	18	3	0	0	1	19	47	87	37	6	28	3	65	143
Championship: March 21, 2026 † indicates conference regular season champion (DeGregorio Trophy) * indicates conference tournament champion (Riley Trophy); Rankings: USCHO.com Top 20 Poll; updated March 22, 2026; Source: AHA

== Schedule and results ==
Date	Time	Opponent^{#}	Rank^{#}	Site	TV	Decision	Result	Attendance	Record
Regular Season
October 4	7:30 pm	at Northeastern*		Matthews Arena • Boston, Massachusetts	ESPN+	Hogg	L 4–6	3,216	0–1–0
October 10	7:00 pm	at #6 Maine*		Alfond Arena • Orono, Maine	ESPN+	MacKenzie	L 2–5	4,980	0–2–0
October 11	7:00 pm	at #6 Maine*		Alfond Arena • Orono, Maine	ESPN+	Leroux	L 0–6	4,980	0–3–0
October 18	5:00 pm	at Mercyhurst		Mercyhurst Ice Center • Erie, Pennsylvania	FloHockey	Hogg	W 4–0	212	1–3–0 (1–0–0)
October 21	7:00 pm	#6 Quinnipiac*		Hart Center • Worcester, Massachusetts	FloHockey	Hogg	L 1–4	1,673	1–4–0
October 24	7:00 pm	at Army		Tate Rink • West Point, New York	FloHockey	Hogg	L 2–5	1,257	1–5–0 (1–1–0)
October 25	4:00 pm	at Army		Tate Rink • West Point, New York	FloHockey	MacKenzie	W 5–1	1,597	2–5–0 (2–1–0)
October 30	7:00 pm	Sacred Heart		Hart Center • Worcester, Massachusetts	FloHockey	MacKenzie	W 5–2	669	3–5–0 (3–1–0)
October 31	7:00 pm	Sacred Heart		Hart Center • Worcester, Massachusetts	FloHockey	MacKenzie	T 2–2 ^{SOW}	971	3–5–1 (3–1–1)
November 7	6:00 pm	Niagara		Hart Center • Worcester, Massachusetts	FloHockey	MacKenzie	W 5–1	927	4–5–1 (4–1–1)
November 8	2:00 pm	Niagara		Hart Center • Worcester, Massachusetts	FloHockey	Leroux	W 6–2	761	5–5–1 (5–1–1)
November 14	9:05 pm	at Air Force		Cadet Ice Arena • Air Force Academy, Colorado	FloHockey	MacKenzie	W 3–2	2,284	6–5–1 (6–1–1)
November 15	9:05 pm	at Air Force		Cadet Ice Arena • Air Force Academy, Colorado	FloHockey	Leroux	W 4–1	2,357	7–5–1 (7–1–1)
November 20	7:00 pm	Alaska Anchorage*		Hart Center • Worcester, Massachusetts	FloHockey	MacKenzie	W 7–2	839	8–5–1
November 23	2:00 pm	Alaska Anchorage*		Hart Center • Worcester, Massachusetts	FloHockey	Leroux	W 1–0	683	9–5–1
November 26	5:00 pm	at #8 Quinnipiac*		M&T Bank Arena • Hamden, Connecticut	ESPN+	MacKenzie	L 6–7 ^{OT}	1,733	9–6–1
December 6	2:00 pm	Mercyhurst		Hart Center • Worcester, Massachusetts	FloHockey	Leroux	W 4–1	692	10–6–1 (8–1–1)
January 2	7:00 pm	at Bentley		Bentley Arena • Waltham, Massachusetts	FloHockey	Leroux	T 2–2 ^{SOL}	1,500	10–6–2 (8–1–2)
January 3	7:00 pm	Bentley		Hart Center • Worcester, Massachusetts	FloHockey	MacKenzie	L 3–8	1,016	10–7–2 (8–2–2)
January 10	7:00 pm	Merrimack*		Hart Center • Worcester, Massachusetts	FloHockey, NESN+	Leroux	L 2–5	933	10–8–2 (8–3–2)
January 16	7:00 pm	Air Force		Hart Center • Worcester, Massachusetts	FloHockey	Leroux	W 3–2 ^{OT}	918	11–8–2 (9–3–2)
January 17	7:00 pm	Air Force		Hart Center • Worcester, Massachusetts	FloHockey	Leroux	L 2–5	828	11–9–2 (9–4–2)
January 23	7:00 pm	at Robert Morris		Clearview Arena • Neville Township, Pennsylvania	FloHockey	Leroux	L 2–5	1,045	11–10–2 (9–5–2)
January 24	7:00 pm	at Robert Morris		Clearview Arena • Neville Township, Pennsylvania	FloHockey	Hogg	L 0–1	567	11–11–2 (9–6–2)
January 29	7:00 pm	Army		Hart Center • Worcester, Massachusetts	FloHockey	Hogg	L 2–3 ^{OT}	807	11–12–2 (9–7–2)
January 30	7:00 pm	Army		Hart Center • Worcester, Massachusetts	FloHockey	Leroux	W 3–0	1,175	12–12–2 (10–7–2)
February 6	7:00 pm	Bentley		Hart Center • Worcester, Massachusetts	FloHockey	Leroux	L 2–4	1,683	12–13–2 (10–8–2)
February 7	6:00 pm	at Bentley		Bentley Arena • Waltham, Massachusetts	FloHockey	Leroux	W 4–1	1,557	13–13–2 (11–8–2)
February 13	7:00 pm	at Canisius		LECOM Harborcenter • Buffalo, New York	FloHockey	Leroux	W 4–3	767	14–13–2 (12–8–2)
February 14	7:00 pm	at Canisius		LECOM Harborcenter • Buffalo, New York	FloHockey	Leroux	L 3–5	891	14–14–2 (12–9–2)
February 20	7:00 pm	at Sacred Heart		Martire Family Arena • Fairfield, Connecticut	FloHockey	Leroux	L 1–5	2,858	14–15–2 (12–10–2)
February 21	6:00 pm	at Sacred Heart		Martire Family Arena • Fairfield, Connecticut	FloHockey	MacKenzie	L 2–5	3,750	14–16–2 (12–11–2)
February 27	7:00 pm	RIT		Hart Center • Worcester, Massachusetts	FloHockey	Leroux	W 5–1	751	15–16–2 (13–11–2)
February 28	7:00 pm	RIT		Hart Center • Worcester, Massachusetts	FloHockey	Leroux	W 3–2	751	16–16–2 (14–11–2)
Atlantic Hockey America Tournament
March 6	7:00 pm	RIT*		Hart Center • Worcester, Massachusetts (AHA Quarterfinal Game 1)	FloHockey	Leroux	W 2–1 ^{OT}	988	16–16–2
March 7	7:00 pm	RIT*		Hart Center • Worcester, Massachusetts (AHA Quarterfinal Game 2)	FloHockey	Leroux	W 5–4 ^{OT}	1,092	17–16–2
March 13	7:00 pm	at Bentley*		Bentley Arena • Waltham, Massachusetts (AHA Semifinal Game 1)	FloHockey	Leroux	L 2–3 ^{OT}	1,466	17–17–2
March 14	6:00 pm	at Bentley*		Bentley Arena • Waltham, Massachusetts (AHA Semifinal Game 2)	FloHockey	Leroux	L 0–4	1,688	17–18–2
*Non-conference game. ^{#}Rankings from USCHO.com Poll. All times are in Eastern Time. Source:

== Scoring statistics ==
Name	Position	Games	Goals	Assists	Points	PIM
Jack Stockfish	C	38	14	21	35	30
Michael Abgrall	C	37	11	12	23	58
Matt DeBoer	W	32	12	10	22	26
Matt Kursonis	C/LW	31	6	15	21	30
Noah Eyre	F	33	8	12	20	24
Devin Phillips	F	23	6	13	19	0
Will Elias	D	38	2	16	18	6
Jack Seymour	RW	38	9	8	17	51
Ty Gagno	F	37	6	11	17	22
Mack Oliphant	D	38	5	12	17	10
Connor Welsh	F	36	8	8	16	15
Timothy Heinke	RW	38	5	11	16	48
Owen Kim	F	35	5	7	12	24
Brody Gagno	D	37	2	8	10	16
Owain Johnston	D	38	2	8	10	88
David Hymovitch	F	31	4	4	8	6
Quinn McCall	D	38	4	4	8	30
Dax Williams	D	35	2	5	7	4
Lachlan Getz	D	32	0	5	5	50
Jarrod Smith	F	18	1	2	3	8
Anthony Carone	F	11	1	1	2	0
Joe Solimine	C	13	0	2	2	27
Anthony Biakabutuka	D	15	0	2	2	0
Will Reardon	F	1	0	0	0	0
William Troutwine	D	1	0	0	0	0
Ryan Buckley	D	1	0	0	0	0
Ben LeFranc	D	1	0	0	0	0
Louden Hogg	G	9	0	0	0	0
Connor MacKenzie	G	12	0	0	0	0
Danick Leroux	G	22	0	0	0	0
Bench	–	–	–	–	–	10
Total			113	197	310	560

== Goaltending statistics ==
Name	Games	Minutes	Wins	Losses	Ties	Goals against	Saves	Shut outs	SV %	GAA
Danick Leroux	23	1301:05	12	9	1	56	552	2	.908	2.58
Connor MacKenzie	12	616:25	5	4	1	32	261	0	.891	3.11
Louden Hogg	10	395:07	1	5	0	21	164	1	.886	3.19
Empty Net	-	14:31	-	-	-	7	-	-	-	-
Total	38	2327:08	18	18	2	116	977	3	.894	2.99

== Rankings ==
Poll	Week																											
Poll	Pre	1	2	3	4	5	6	7	8	9	10	11	12	13	14	15	16	17	18	19	20	21	22	23	24	25	26	27 (Final)
USCHO.com	RV	NR	NR	NR	NR	NR	RV	RV	RV	RV	RV	RV	–	RV	RV	NR	NR	NR	NR	NR	NR	NR	NR	NR	NR	NR	NR	NR
USA Hockey	NR	NR	NR	NR	NR	NR	RV	NR	RV	NR	RV	RV	–	RV	NR	NR	NR	NR	NR	NR	NR	NR	NR	NR	NR	NR	NR	NR

Note: USCHO did not release a poll in week 12.
Note: USA Hockey did not release a poll in week 12.
