= 2025–26 Bentley Falcons men's ice hockey season =

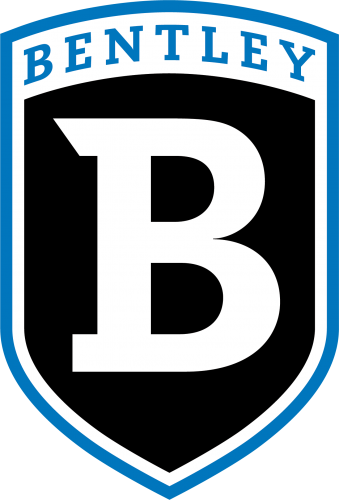

AHA, Champion AHA Tournament, Champion NCAA Tournament, Regional Semifinal
- Conference: 1st AHA
- Home ice: Bentley Arena

Rankings
- USCHO: #20
- USA Hockey: #20

Record
- Overall: 23–12–5
- Conference: 16–6–4
- Home: 13–7–3
- Road: 10–4–2
- Neutral: 0–1–0

Coaches and captains
- Head coach: Andy Jones
- Assistant coaches: Tom Fiorentino; Riley Colvard
- Captain: Stephen Castagna

The 2025–26 Bentley Falcons men's ice hockey season was the 49th season of play for the program, the 27th at the Division I level and the 2nd in Atlantic Hockey America. The Falcons represented Bentley University in the 2025–26 NCAA Division I men's ice hockey season, played their home games at the Bentley Arena and were coached by Andy Jones in his third season.

== Departures ==
Player	Position	Nationality	Cause
Nik Armstrong-Kingcade	Forward	Germany	Graduation (retired)
Max Beckford	Goaltender	Canada	Transferred to Minnesota State
Nick Bochen	Defenseman	Canada	Graduation (signed with Vimmerby HC)
Artem Buzoberya	Forward	Ukraine	Graduation (signed with Coventry Blaze)
Samuel Duerr	Defenseman	United States	Graduation (signed with Anglet Hormadi Élite)
Connor Hasley	Goaltender	United States	Transferred to Arizona State
A. J. Hodges	Forward	United States	Graduation (retired)
Tucker Hodgson	Defenseman	United States	Graduation (retired)
Ethan Leyh	Forward	Canada	Graduation (signed with Greensboro Gargoyles)
Tanner Main	Defenseman	Canada	Graduation (signed with Étoile Noire de Strasbourg)

== Recruiting ==
Player	Position	Nationality	Age	Notes
Tobias Bjercke Larsen	Defenseman	Norway	20	Oslo, NOR; transfer from American International
Dylan Cook	Forward	United States	22	Princeton, MN; transfer from Massachusetts Lowell
John Dalton	Defenseman	United States	22	River Forest, IL; transfer from Maine
Jack Erickson	Goaltender	United States	21	White Bear Lake, MN
Jack Farrell	Defenseman	United States	21	Wilmington, MA
Jan Gaspar	Forward	Czech Republic	20	Prague, CZE
Owen Goodbrand	Forward	Canada	21	Waterdown, ON
Easton Hesse	Goaltender	Canada	25	Beaumont, AB; transfer from Lake Superior State
Alec Leonard	Defenseman	Canada	21	Toronto, ON; transfer from Maine
Michael Mesic	Forward	United States	21	Fort Myers, FL; transfer from Northern Michigan
Márton Nemes	Forward	Hungary	19	Székesfehérvár, HUN
Lukas Swedin	Goaltender	Sweden	21	Stockholm, SWE

== Roster ==
As of August 11, 2025

No.	Nat.	Player	Class	Pos	Height	Weight	DoB	Hometown	Previous team	NHL rights
1	(United States)	Jack Erickson	Freshman	G	6' 1" (1.85 m)	174 lb (79 kg)	2004-09-28	White Bear Lake, Minnesota	Colorado Grit (NAHL)	—
2	(United States)	David Helledy	Sophomore	D	6' 0" (1.83 m)	181 lb (82 kg)	2003-05-04	Milwaukee, Wisconsin	Maine Nordiques (NAHL)	—
4	(Norway)	Tobias Bjercke Larsen	Sophomore	D	6' 2" (1.88 m)	207 lb (94 kg)	2004-08-27	Oslo, Norway	American International (AHA)	—
5	(United States)	Dylan Cook	Sophomore	F	6' 0" (1.83 m)	190 lb (86 kg)	2003-03-02	Princeton, Minnesota	Massachusetts Lowell (HEA)	—
6	(Canada)	Seth Bernard-Docker	Senior	D	6' 0" (1.83 m)	190 lb (86 kg)	2001-10-30	Canmore, Alberta	Sioux Falls Stampede (USHL)	—
7	(Canada)	Alec Leonard	Freshman	D	5' 11" (1.8 m)	174 lb (79 kg)	2004-05-13	Toronto, Ontario	Owen Sound Attack (OHL)	—
8	(Finland)	Oliver Salo	Sophomore	F	6' 1" (1.85 m)	190 lb (86 kg)	2003-07-09	Kaarina, Finland	Anchorage Wolverines (NAHL)	—
9	(United States)	Jake Black	Senior	D	5' 11" (1.8 m)	180 lb (82 kg)	2002-03-05	Pomfret, Connecticut	Connecticut (HEA)	—
10	(United States)	Jimmy Doyle	Junior	F	6' 2" (1.88 m)	190 lb (86 kg)	2002-04-02	Plainfield, Illinois	Janesville Jets (NAHL)	—
11	(Canada)	Ryan Mansfield	Junior	F	5' 11" (1.8 m)	195 lb (88 kg)	2002-12-22	Burlington, Ontario	Odessa Jackalopes (NAHL)	—
12	(Canada)	Owen Goodbrand	Freshman	F	6' 2" (1.88 m)	181 lb (82 kg)	2004-04-02	Waterdown, Ontario	Prince George Spruce Kings (BCHL)	—
13	(United States)	Peter Kramer	Junior	F	5' 11" (1.8 m)	185 lb (84 kg)	2002-08-08	Bridgewater, Massachusetts	Green Bay Gamblers (USHL)	—
14	(United States)	Pat Lawn	Senior	D	6' 0" (1.83 m)	175 lb (79 kg)	2001-03-26	Waltham, Massachusetts	West Kelowna Warriors (BCHL)	—
15	(Norway)	Oskar Kind Bakkevig	Sophomore	F	5' 11" (1.8 m)	183 lb (83 kg)	2004-07-24	Oslo, Norway	Malmö Redhawks J20 (J20 Nationell)	—
16	(Canada)	Kellan Hjartarson	Junior	F	5' 11" (1.8 m)	175 lb (79 kg)	2003-02-23	Calgary, Alberta	Cranbrook Bucks (BCHL)	—
17	(Canada)	Stephen Castagna (C)	Senior	F	5' 9" (1.75 m)	170 lb (77 kg)	2001-08-06	North Vancouver, British Columbia	Alberni Valley Bulldogs (BCHL)	—
18	(Canada)	Arlo Merritt	Senior	F	6' 3" (1.91 m)	215 lb (98 kg)	2001-01-31	Halifax, Nova Scotia	Alberni Valley Bulldogs (BCHL)	—
19	(United States)	Michael Mesic	Sophomore	F	5' 9" (1.75 m)	180 lb (82 kg)	2004-08-15	Plymouth, Michigan	Youngstown Phantoms (USHL)	—
20	(Czech Republic)	Jan Gaspar	Freshman	F	5' 10" (1.78 m)	174 lb (79 kg)	2004-10-18	Prague, Czech Republic	Bismarck Bobcats (NAHL)	—
21	(United States)	Jack Dalton	Junior	D	6' 0" (1.83 m)	174 lb (79 kg)	2003-07-22	River Forest, Illinois	Maine (HEA)	—
22	(United States)	Chase Davis	Junior	F	6' 4" (1.93 m)	210 lb (95 kg)	2002-04-08	Alpharetta, Georgia	Amarillo Wranglers (NAHL)	—
23	(Hungary)	Márton Nemes	Freshman	F	6' 2" (1.88 m)	198 lb (90 kg)	2005-10-23	Székesfehérvár, Hungary	Mora IK J20 (J20 Nationell)	—
24	(Canada)	Colton Cameron	Junior	D	5' 11" (1.8 m)	190 lb (86 kg)	2002-07-07	Surrey, British Columbia	Prince George Spruce Kings (BCHL)	—
25	(United States)	Garrett Horsager	Junior	D	6' 0" (1.83 m)	180 lb (82 kg)	2002-02-02	Rosemount, Minnesota	Oklahoma Warriors (NAHL)	—
26	(United States)	Kolby Amici	Junior	F	5' 9" (1.75 m)	180 lb (82 kg)	2002-12-16	Orchard Park, New York	Minot Minotauros (NAHL)	—
27	(Canada)	Ryan Nause	Senior	D	5' 11" (1.8 m)	180 lb (82 kg)	2001-08-27	Riverview, New Brunswick	Alberni Valley Bulldogs (BCHL)	—
28	(United States)	Jack Farrell	Freshman	D	6' 0" (1.83 m)	192 lb (87 kg)	2004-06-10	Wilmington, Massachusetts	West Kelowna Warriors (BCHL)	—
29	(United States)	Nick Bevilacqua	Sophomore	G	6' 0" (1.83 m)	190 lb (86 kg)	2003-08-06	Abington, Massachusetts	P.A.L. Junior Islanders (NCDC)	—
30	(Canada)	Easton Hesse	Senior (RS)	G	6' 0" (1.83 m)	175 lb (79 kg)	2000-06-28	Beaumont, Alberta	Lake Superior State (CCHA)	—
38	(Canada)	Ryan Upson	Senior	F	6' 0" (1.83 m)	190 lb (86 kg)	2001-03-22	West Vancouver, British Columbia	Langley Rivermen (BCHL)	—
60	(Sweden)	Lukas Swedin	Freshman	G	5' 10" (1.78 m)	161 lb (73 kg)	2004-04-16	Stockholm, Sweden	Minot Minotauros (NAHL)	—

== Standings ==
2025–26 Atlantic Hockey America Standings
	Conference record										Overall record					
	GP	W	L	T	OW	OL	SW	PTS	GF	GA	GP	W	L	T	GF	GA
#20 Bentley †*	26	16	6	4	1	0	2	53	85	56	39	23	11	5	122	89
Sacred Heart	26	15	8	3	1	0	1	48	80	61	40	23	14	3	118	96
Robert Morris	26	13	11	2	0	2	2	45	69	69	40	16	21	3	103	128
Holy Cross	26	14	10	2	1	1	1	45	81	69	38	18	18	2	113	116
RIT	26	13	11	2	2	1	2	42	69	68	36	17	17	2	93	96
Air Force	26	13	10	3	2	1	0	41	75	73	37	18	15	4	108	112
Canisius	26	12	12	2	1	0	2	39	81	74	35	17	16	2	107	105
Niagara	26	9	16	1	1	3	0	30	67	83	37	13	23	1	93	118
Army	26	7	15	4	2	3	2	28	61	75	35	12	17	6	91	96
Mercyhurst	26	5	18	3	0	0	1	19	47	87	37	6	28	3	65	143
Championship: March 21, 2026 † indicates conference regular season champion (DeGregorio Trophy) * indicates conference tournament champion (Riley Trophy); Rankings: USCHO.com Top 20 Poll; updated March 22, 2026; Source: AHA

== Schedule and results ==
Date	Time	Opponent^{#}	Rank^{#}	Site	TV	Decision	Result	Attendance	Record
Exhibition
October 4	7:00 pm	Simon Fraser*		Bentley Arena • Waltham, Massachusetts (Exhibition)	FloHockey				
Regular season
October 10	9:00 pm	at Colorado College*		Ed Robson Arena • Colorado Springs, Colorado		Hesse	L 2–5	3,532	0–1–0
October 11	9:00 pm	at #5 Denver*		Magness Arena • Denver, Colorado		Hesse	L 0–6	6,380	0–2–0
October 18	7:30 pm	at #11 Massachusetts*		Mullins Center • Amherst, Massachusetts	ESPN+	Hesse	L 4–5 ^{OT}	6,108	0–3–0
October 24	7:00 pm	Canisius		Bentley Arena • Waltham, Massachusetts	FloHockey	Bevilacqua	W 4–1	1,800	1–3–0 (1–0–0)
October 25	6:00 pm	Canisius		Bentley Arena • Waltham, Massachusetts	FloHockey	Bevilacqua	W 3–0	1,305	2–3–0 (2–0–0)
October 31	7:00 pm	at Mercyhurst		Mercyhurst Ice Center • Erie, Pennsylvania	FloHockey	Bevilacqua	W 3–1	759	3–3–0 (3–0–0)
November 1	5:00 pm	at Mercyhurst		Mercyhurst Ice Center • Erie, Pennsylvania	FloHockey	Swedin	W 7–2	699	4–3–0 (4–0–0)
November 7	7:00 pm	Army		Bentley Arena • Waltham, Massachusetts	FloHockey	Bevilacqua	T 3–3 ^{SOL}	1,700	4–3–1 (4–0–1)
November 9	2:00 pm	at Army		Tate Rink • West Point, New York	FloHockey	Swedin	W 3–2	2,086	5–3–1 (5–0–1)
November 14	7:00 pm	Alaska Anchorage*		Bentley Arena • Waltham, Massachusetts	FloHockey	Swedin	W 2–1 ^{OT}	1,667	6–3–1
November 15	6:00 pm	Alaska Anchorage*		Bentley Arena • Waltham, Massachusetts	FloHockey	Bevilacqua	L 2–3	1,267	6–4–1
November 21	7:00 pm	RIT		Bentley Arena • Waltham, Massachusetts	FloHockey	Swedin	W 3–2	1,675	7–4–1 (6–0–1)
November 25	7:00 pm	at Army		Tate Rink • West Point, New York	FloHockey	Swedin	W 3–1	1,346	8–4–1 (7–0–1)
November 29	5:00 pm	New Hampshire*		Bentley Arena • Waltham, Massachusetts	FloHockey	Swedin	L 0–3	1,589	8–5–1
December 5	7:00 pm	Niagara		Bentley Arena • Waltham, Massachusetts	FloHockey	Swedin	L 1–3	1,319	8–6–1 (7–1–1)
December 6	6:00 pm	Niagara		Bentley Arena • Waltham, Massachusetts	FloHockey	Bevilacqua	W 3–2	1,280	9–6–1 (8–1–1)
December 28	3:30 pm	at Massachusetts Lowell*		Tsongas Center • Lowell, Massachusetts (Exhibition)	ESPN+	Hesse	L 2–3 ^{OT}		
January 2	7:00 pm	Holy Cross		Bentley Arena • Waltham, Massachusetts	FloHockey	Swedin	T 2–2 ^{SOW}	1,500	9–6–2 (8–1–2)
January 3	7:00 pm	at Holy Cross		Hart Center • Worcester, Massachusetts	FloHockey	Swedin	W 8–3	1,016	10–6–2 (9–1–2)
January 9	9:00 pm	at Air Force		Cadet Ice Arena • Air Force Academy, Colorado	FloHockey	Swedin	W 5–1	2,529	11–6–2 (10–1–2)
January 10	7:00 pm	at Air Force		Cadet Ice Arena • Air Force Academy, Colorado	FloHockey	Swedin	W 3–1	2,396	12–6–2 (11–1–2)
January 16	7:00 pm	at Sacred Heart		Martire Family Arena • Fairfield, Connecticut	FloHockey	Swedin	L 2–3	2,222	12–7–2 (11–2–2)
January 17	6:00 pm	at Sacred Heart		Martire Family Arena • Fairfield, Connecticut	FloHockey	Swedin	T 4–4 ^{SOW}	2,499	12–7–3 (11–2–3)
January 23	7:00 pm	Princeton*		Bentley Arena • Waltham, Massachusetts	FloHockey	Bevilacqua	W 4–1	1,800	13–7–3
January 24	6:00 pm	Princeton*		Bentley Arena • Waltham, Massachusetts	FloHockey	Swedin	T 2–2 ^{OT}	1,545	13–7–4
January 30	7:00 pm	at Robert Morris		Clearview Arena • Neville Township, Pennsylvania	FloHockey	Bevilacqua	W 5–0	373	14–7–4 (12–2–3)
January 31	7:00 pm	at Robert Morris		Clearview Arena • Neville Township, Pennsylvania	FloHockey	Swedin	T 3–3 ^{SOL}	412	14–7–5 (12–2–4)
February 6	7:00 pm	at Holy Cross		Hart Center • Worcester, Massachusetts	FloHockey	Bevilacqua	W 4–2	1,683	15–7–5 (13–2–4)
February 7	6:00 pm	Holy Cross		Bentley Arena • Waltham, Massachusetts	FloHockey	Swedin	L 1–4	1,557	15–8–5 (13–3–4)
February 10	7:00 pm	at Army		Tate Rink • West Point, New York	FloHockey	Bevilacqua	W 4–3 ^{OT}	1,157	16–8–5 (14–3–4)
February 13	7:00 pm	Sacred Heart		Bentley Arena • Waltham, Massachusetts	FloHockey	Swedin	L 0–4	1,511	16–9–5 (14–4–4)
February 14	6:00 pm	Sacred Heart		Bentley Arena • Waltham, Massachusetts	FloHockey	Bevilacqua	W 5–1	1,218	17–9–5 (15–4–4)
February 20	7:05 pm	at RIT		Gene Polisseni Center • Henrietta, New York	FloHockey	Swedin	W 4–3	4,233	18–9–5 (16–4–4)
February 27	7:00 pm	Air Force		Bentley Arena • Waltham, Massachusetts	FloHockey	Bevilacqua	L 2–3	1,513	18–10–5 (16–5–4)
February 28	6:00 pm	Air Force		Bentley Arena • Waltham, Massachusetts	FloHockey	Swedin	L 0–2	1,490	18–11–5 (16–6–4)
Atlantic Hockey America tournament
March 6	7:00 pm	Mercyhurst*		Bentley Arena • Waltham, Massachusetts (AHA Quarterfinal Game 1)	FloHockey	Swedin	W 4–3 ^{3OT}	1,184	19–11–5
March 7	6:00 pm	Mercyhurst*		Bentley Arena • Waltham, Massachusetts (AHA Quarterfinal Game 2)	FloHockey	Swedin	W 6–0	1,110	20–11–5
March 13	7:00 pm	Holy Cross*		Bentley Arena • Waltham, Massachusetts (AHA Semifinal Game 1)	FloHockey	Swedin	W 3–2 ^{OT}	1,466	21–11–5
March 14	6:00 pm	Holy Cross*		Bentley Arena • Waltham, Massachusetts (AHA Semifinal Game 2)	FloHockey	Swedin	W 4–0	1,688	22–11–5
March 21	7:00 pm	Sacred Heart*	#20	Bentley Arena • Waltham, Massachusetts (AHA Championship)	FloHockey	Swedin	W 3–2	2,500	23–11–5
NCAA Tournament
March 27	5:30 pm	vs. #1 Michigan*	#20	MVP Arena • Albany, New York (Regional Semifinal)	ESPNU	Swedin	L 1–5	5,237	23–12–5
*Non-conference game. ^{#}Rankings from USCHO.com Poll. All times are in Eastern Time. Source:

== Rankings ==
Ranking movements Legend: ██ Increase in ranking ██ Decrease in ranking — = Not ranked RV = Received votes
	Week																											
Poll	Pre	1	2	3	4	5	6	7	8	9	10	11	12	13	14	15	16	17	18	19	20	21	22	23	24	25	26	Final
USCHO.com	RV	RV	—	—	—	RV	RV	—	RV	—	—	—	*	—	RV	RV	RV	RV	RV	RV	RV	RV	RV	RV	20	20		
USA Hockey	RV	—	—	—	—	RV	RV	—	—	—	—	—	*	—	RV	RV	—	RV	RV	—	RV	RV	RV	RV	RV	20		

Note: USCHO did not release a week 12 poll.
Note: USA Hockey did not release a week 12 poll.
