= 2025–26 Sacred Heart Pioneers men's ice hockey season =

- Conference: 2nd AHA
- Home ice: Martire Family Arena

Rankings
- USCHO: NR
- USA Hockey: NR

Record
- Overall: 23–14–3
- Conference: 15–8–3
- Home: 12–6–2
- Road: 10–6–1
- Neutral: 1–2–0

Coaches and captains
- Head coach: C. J. Marottolo
- Assistant coaches: Scott McDougall; Steve Bergin; Chris Azzano
- Captain(s): Mikey Adamson; Reid Pabich
- Alternate captain(s): John Driscoll; Marcus Joughin

The 2025–26 Sacred Heart Pioneers men's ice hockey season will be the 33rd season of play for the program, the 28th at the Division I level and the 2nd in Atlantic Hockey America. The Pioneers will represent Sacred Heart University in the 2025–26 NCAA Division I men's ice hockey season, play their home games at the Martire Family Arena and be coached by C. J. Marottolo in his 17th season.

== Season ==
Sacred Heart entered the season with high expectations. The Pioneers were ranked as the top team in the conference in the preseason poll thanks in no small part to returning three all-conference players. Félix Trudeau, Mikey Adamson and Ajeet Gundarah gave the Pioneers potential star power at all three positions. Despite retaining their leading scorer from last season (Trudeau), Sacred Heart lost five of its top nine point producers. Those departures took with them more than a third of the Pioneers' goals from '25 and the early results were affected by their absences. In the first five weeks of the season, Sacred Heart managed more than 2 goals just once. Gundarah was able to get a few wins in spite of the scoring dearth, including a mild upset over #14 Ohio State, but the team was still under water by mid-November. Around Thanksgiving, the offense finally rounded into shape and began to capitalize on their netminder's steady goaltending. Just as the team was setting itself up for a run, disaster struck when Gundarah was felled by a high ankle sprain in late-November and would mix the next two and a half months.

While the team could have spiraled after losing their netminder, Teagan Kendrick stepped in to save the day. The freshman acted like an experienced hand in goal and led the team on a 6–1–2 run while allowing around 2 goals per game. Trudeau's gaudy scoring totals helped shoot the Pioneers up the conference standings and had the club well-situated when they began the Connecticut Ice tournament. Sacred Heart underperformed against their in-state rivals and then went through a skid of intermittent scoring. Inexplicably, the team that had pretentions of competing in the NCAA tournament lost to Mercyhurst, the lowest-ranked team in the nation, during that time.

However, the club was buoyed by the return of Gundarah in the middle of February. The Pioneers won the final four games on their schedule to finish second and guarantee themselves a home stand for at least two rounds of the postseason. Gundarah's strong play continued into the playoffs and Niagara was limited to just one goal per game as Sacred Heart swept their way into the semifinals. After a relatively easy win in the first game, the Pioneers found themselves in a win-or-die position when Robert Morris won the rematch. Gundarah refocused and posted a 36-save shutout to send the team to their first conference title game in 16 years.

Getting a solid performance from their netminder, Sacred Heart had trouble getting on the scoreboard and found itself down early in the second period. Undaunted, Vitaly Levyy and Gavin Bryant combined to give the Pioneers a lead heading into the third. Unfortunately, the team ran out of steam in the final 20 minutes. Bentley scored twice in the final frame and Sacred Heart could only muster 5 shots in the period as their chance at a tournament berth slipped away.

Despite the sour end, this season saw the team set a new program record for wins, breaking the previous high of 21 that they had achieved on four separate occasions.

== Departures ==
Player	Position	Nationality	Cause
Gabe Blanchard	Defenseman	United States	Graduation (signed with Greensboro Gargoyles)
Cullen DeYoung	Goaltender	United States	Transferred to Vermont
Max Dorrington	Forward	United States	Graduation (signed with Bridgeport Islanders)
Brendan Dumas	Forward	United States	Transferred to Trinity
Daniel Ebrahim	Forward	Canada	Graduation (signed with Adirondack Thunder)
Willyam Gendron	Forward	Canada	Transferred to McGill
Tyler Ghirardosi	Forward	Canada	Graduation (retired)
Matthew Guerra	Forward	United States	Graduation (signed with Wichita Thunder)
Rylee Hlusiak	Forward	Canada	Transferred to Toronto
John Jaworski	Forward	United States	Graduation (signed with Cincinnati Cyclones)
Brendan Kennette	Defenseman	Canada	Left program (retired)
Jack O'Dea	Goaltender	United States	Graduation (retired)
Cole O'Donnell	Goaltender	United States	Left program (retired)
Hunter Sansbury	Defenseman	United States	Graduation (signed with Florida Everblades)
Garrett Sundquist	Defenseman	United States	Left program (retired)

== Recruiting ==
Player	Position	Nationality	Age	Notes
Joshua Barnes	Forward	Canada	23	Cornwall, ON; transfer from American International
David Brandes	Defenseman	Canada	21	Toronto, ON
Gavin Bryant	Forward	United States	21	Ingersoll, ON
Noah Ellis	Defenseman	United States	23	Urbandale, IA; transfer from Omaha; selected 184th overall in 2020
Ray Fust	Forward	Switzerland	22	Bellinzona, SUI; transfer from Clarkson
Jack Hillier	Forward	Canada	20	Petawawa, ON
Stéphane Huard	Forward	Canada	23	Blainville, QC; transfer from McGill
Teagan Kendrick	Goaltender	Canada	21	St. Albert, AB
Liam Lesakowski	Defenseman	United States	21	Buffalo, NY; transfer from Maine
Chase Ramsay	Defenseman	United States	22	Granite Springs, NY; transfer from Quinnipiac
Connor Smith	Goaltender	United States	22	West Haven, CT; joined from club team
Noah Van Vliet	Defenseman	Canada	21	Toronto, ON
Ethan Wolthers	Forward	United States	24	Valencia, CA; transfer from Western Michigan

== Roster ==
As of August 2, 2025.

No.	Nat.	Player	Class	Pos	Height	Weight	DoB	Hometown	Previous team	NHL rights
1	(Canada)	Ajeet Gundarah	Sophomore	G	5' 10" (1.78 m)	181 lb (82 kg)	2003-05-09	Richmond, British Columbia	Surrey Eagles (BCHL)	—
2	(United States)	Aiden VanRooyan	Sophomore	D	6' 2" (1.88 m)	201 lb (91 kg)	2003-04-20	Dakota Dunes, South Dakota	Des Moines Buccaneers (USHL)	—
3	(United States)	Paul Minnehan	Sophomore	F	6' 1" (1.85 m)	172 lb (78 kg)	2003-04-09	Cypress, California	Des Moines Buccaneers (USHL)	—
4	(United States)	John Driscoll (A)	Senior	D	6' 4" (1.93 m)	205 lb (93 kg)	2001-08-19	Eagle, Idaho	Army (AHA)	—
5	(United States)	Luke Amell	Sophomore	D/F	6' 4" (1.93 m)	205 lb (93 kg)	2003-09-02	Mars, Pennsylvania	Maryland Black Bears (NAHL)	—
6	(United States)	Mikey Adamson (C)	Senior	D	5' 9" (1.75 m)	170 lb (77 kg)	2001-08-16	Quincy, Massachusetts	Massachusetts (HEA)	—
8	(United States)	Chase Ramsay	Junior	D	6' 0" (1.83 m)	181 lb (82 kg)	2003-06-10	Granite Springs, New York	Quinnipiac (ECAC)	—
9	(Canada)	Josh Barnes	Senior	F	5' 10" (1.78 m)	175 lb (79 kg)	2002-09-27	Cornwall, Ontario	American International (AHA)	—
10	(United States)	Liam Lesakowski	Junior	D	6' 5" (1.96 m)	220 lb (100 kg)	2003-12-12	Buffalo, New York	Maine (HEA)	—
11	(United States)	Jake Hewitt	Junior	F	5' 10" (1.78 m)	180 lb (82 kg)	2002-07-05	Ashburnham, Massachusetts	Army (AHA)	—
13	(Canada)	Gavin Bryant	Freshman	F	5' 11" (1.8 m)	187 lb (85 kg)	2004-07-24	Ingersoll, Ontario	Peterborough Petes (OHL)	—
14	(Canada)	Jack Hillier	Freshman	F	6' 2" (1.88 m)	159 lb (72 kg)	2004-10-08	Petawawa, Ontario	New Jersey Titans (NAHL)	—
17	(United States)	Vitaly Levyy	Sophomore	F	5' 11" (1.8 m)	170 lb (77 kg)	2003-05-09	Old Brookville, New York	Langley Rivermen (BCHL)	—
19	(United States)	Jake Bongo	Junior	F	5' 10" (1.78 m)	170 lb (77 kg)	2002-02-04	Ridgefield, Connecticut	Surrey Eagles (BCHL)	—
20	(Canada)	David Brandes	Freshman	D	5' 10" (1.78 m)	179 lb (81 kg)	2004-01-24	Toronto, Ontario	Coquitlam Express (BCHL)	—
21	(United States)	Noah Ellis	Senior	D	6' 3" (1.91 m)	192 lb (87 kg)	2002-02-01	Urbandale, Iowa	Omaha (NCHC)	VGK, 184th overall 2020
22	(Canada)	Noah Van Vliet	Freshman	D	6' 2" (1.88 m)	225 lb (102 kg)	2004-02-18	Toronto, Ontario	Niagara IceDogs (OHL)	—
23	(Switzerland)	Ray Fust	Senior	F	6' 3" (1.91 m)	204 lb (93 kg)	2002-10-23	Bellinzona, Switzerland	Clarkson (ECAC)	—
24	(United States)	Michael Rubin	Sophomore	D	6' 1" (1.85 m)	183 lb (83 kg)	2003-05-05	Blauvelt, New York	Coquitlam Express (BCHL)	—
25	(Canada)	Jérémi Tremblay	Sophomore	F	6' 1" (1.85 m)	190 lb (86 kg)	2003-01-01	Quebec City, Quebec	Maryland Black Bears (NAHL)	—
27	(Canada)	Cole Galata	Junior	F	5' 10" (1.78 m)	175 lb (79 kg)	2002-03-18	Barrie, Ontario	Surrey Eagles (BCHL)	—
28	(Canada)	Marcus Joughin (A)	Senior	F	5' 11" (1.8 m)	180 lb (82 kg)	2001-07-05	Tecumseh, Ontario	West Kelowna Warriors (BCHL)	—
30	(United States)	Jack Spicer	Sophomore	G	6' 1" (1.85 m)	185 lb (84 kg)	2004-04-28	Rockville, Maryland	Lone Star Brahmas (NAHL)	—
33	(Canada)	Teagan Kendrick	Freshman	G	6' 4" (1.93 m)	201 lb (91 kg)	2004-02-08	St. Albert, Alberta	Trail Smoke Eaters (BCHL)	—
71	(Canada)	Stéphane Huard	Junior	F	5' 8" (1.73 m)	179 lb (81 kg)	2002-01-06	Blainville, Quebec	McGill (OUA)	—
72	(United States)	Connor Smith	Graduate	G	5' 8" (1.73 m)	150 lb (68 kg)		West Haven, Connecticut	Sacred Heart (ACHA)	—
77	(Canada)	Félix Trudeau	Senior	F	6' 2" (1.88 m)	189 lb (86 kg)	2002-09-24	Terrebonne, Quebec	Maine (HEA)	—
86	(Canada)	Charles-Edward Tardif	Sophomore	F	6' 0" (1.83 m)	201 lb (91 kg)	2003-03-03	Quebec City, Quebec	Maine Nordiques (NAHL)	—
91	(United States)	Reid Pabich (C)	Senior	F	5' 11" (1.8 m)	175 lb (79 kg)	2001-10-05	Verona, Wisconsin	Maine (HEA)	—
98	(United States)	Ethan Wolthers	Senior	F	5' 8" (1.73 m)	155 lb (70 kg)	2001-07-19	Valencia, California	Western Michigan (NCHC)	—

== Standings ==
2025–26 Atlantic Hockey America Standings
	Conference record										Overall record					
	GP	W	L	T	OW	OL	SW	PTS	GF	GA	GP	W	L	T	GF	GA
#20 Bentley †*	26	16	6	4	1	0	2	53	85	56	39	23	11	5	122	89
Sacred Heart	26	15	8	3	1	0	1	48	80	61	40	23	14	3	118	96
Robert Morris	26	13	11	2	0	2	2	45	69	69	40	16	21	3	103	128
Holy Cross	26	14	10	2	1	1	1	45	81	69	38	18	18	2	113	116
RIT	26	13	11	2	2	1	2	42	69	68	36	17	17	2	93	96
Air Force	26	13	10	3	2	1	0	41	75	73	37	18	15	4	108	112
Canisius	26	12	12	2	1	0	2	39	81	74	35	17	16	2	107	105
Niagara	26	9	16	1	1	3	0	30	67	83	37	13	23	1	93	118
Army	26	7	15	4	2	3	2	28	61	75	35	12	17	6	91	96
Mercyhurst	26	5	18	3	0	0	1	19	47	87	37	6	28	3	65	143
Championship: March 21, 2026 † indicates conference regular season champion (DeGregorio Trophy) * indicates conference tournament champion (Riley Trophy); Rankings: USCHO.com Top 20 Poll; updated March 22, 2026; Source: AHA

== Schedule and results ==
Date	Time	Opponent^{#}	Rank^{#}	Site	TV	Decision	Result	Attendance	Record
Exhibition
October 4	6:00 pm	Merrimack*		Martire Family Arena • Fairfield, Connecticut (Exhibition)	FloHockey	Gundarah	L 0–3	523	
October 6	4:00 pm	Simon Fraser*		Martire Family Arena • Fairfield, Connecticut (Exhibition)	FloHockey	Kendrick	W 5–1	484	
Regular Season
October 10	7:00 pm	at RIT		Gene Polisseni Center • Henrietta, New York	FloHockey	Gundarah	W 1–0	2,271	1–0–0 (1–0–0)
October 11	5:00 pm	at RIT		Gene Polisseni Center • Henrietta, New York	FloHockey	Gundarah	W 6–1	1,937	2–0–0 (2–0–0)
October 18	5:00 pm	Stonehill*		Martire Family Arena • Fairfield, Connecticut	FloHockey	Kendrick	L 2–3	2,634	2–1–0
October 24	6:30 pm	at #14 Ohio State*		Value City Arena • Columbus, Ohio		Gundarah	W 2–1 ^{OT}	3,635	3–1–0
October 25	5:00 pm	at #14 Ohio State*		Value City Arena • Columbus, Ohio		Gundarah	L 0–3	3,071	3–2–0
October 30	7:00 pm	at Holy Cross		Hart Center • Worcester, Massachusetts	FloHockey	Gundarah	L 2–5	669	3–3–0 (2–1–0)
October 31	7:00 pm	at Holy Cross		Hart Center • Worcester, Massachusetts	FloHockey	Gundarah	T 2–2 ^{SOL}	971	3–3–1 (2–1–1)
November 7	7:00 pm	Air Force		Martire Family Arena • Fairfield, Connecticut	FloHockey	Gundarah	L 1–4	3,191	3–4–1 (2–2–1)
November 8	7:00 pm	Air Force		Martire Family Arena • Fairfield, Connecticut	FloHockey	Gundarah	L 2–3	3,450	3–5–1 (2–3–1)
November 14	7:00 pm	Canisius		Martire Family Arena • Fairfield, Connecticut	FloHockey	Gundarah	W 6–1	2,513	4–5–1 (3–3–1)
November 15	5:00 pm	Canisius		Martire Family Arena • Fairfield, Connecticut	FloHockey	Gundarah	W 3–2	2,736	5–5–1 (4–3–1)
November 22	5:00 pm	Long Island*		Martire Family Arena • Fairfield, Connecticut	FloHockey	Gundarah	W 7–2	2,543	6–5–1
Friendship Four
November 28	9:00 am	vs. #20 Union*		SSE Arena Belfast • Belfast, Northern Ireland (Friendship Four Semifinal)		Gundarah	L 1–8	3,511	6–6–1
November 29	10:00 am	vs. RIT*		SSE Arena Belfast • Belfast, Northern Ireland (Friendship Four Consolation Game)		Kendrick	W 3–0	4,101	7–6–1
December 5	7:00 pm	Army		Martire Family Arena • Fairfield, Connecticut	FloHockey	Kendrick	T 3–3 ^{SOW}	2,360	7–6–2 (4–3–2)
December 6	5:00 pm	Army		Martire Family Arena • Fairfield, Connecticut	FloHockey	Kendrick	L 0–2	2,588	7–7–2 (4–4–2)
December 30	4:00 pm	Robert Morris		Martire Family Arena • Fairfield, Connecticut	FloHockey	Kendrick	W 5–2	2,524	8–7–2 (5–4–2)
January 3	4:00 pm	at Robert Morris		Clearview Arena • Neville Township, Pennsylvania	FloHockey	Kendrick	W 3–1	724	9–7–2 (6–4–2)
January 9	6:00 pm	at Niagara		Dwyer Arena • Lewiston, New York	FloHockey	Kendrick	W 5–4 ^{OT}	762	10–7–2 (7–4–2)
January 10	5:00 pm	at Niagara		Dwyer Arena • Lewiston, New York	FloHockey	Kendrick	W 4–2	754	11–7–2 (8–4–2)
January 16	7:00 pm	Bentley		Martire Family Arena • Fairfield, Connecticut	FloHockey	Kendrick	W 3–2	2,222	12–7–2 (9–4–2)
January 17	6:00 pm	Bentley		Martire Family Arena • Fairfield, Connecticut	FloHockey	Kendrick	T 4–4 ^{SOL}	2,499	12–7–3 (9–4–3)
Connecticut Ice
January 23	4:00 pm	vs. #6 Quinnipiac*		Ingalls Rink • New Haven, Connecticut (Connecticut Ice Semifinal)	YES	Kendrick	L 1–5	2,100	12–8–3
January 24	4:00 pm	at Yale*		Ingalls Rink • New Haven, Connecticut (Connecticut Ice Consolation Game)	YES	Kendrick	W 3–2	2,521	13–8–3
January 30	9:05 pm	at Air Force		Cadet Ice Arena • Air Force Academy, Colorado	FloHockey	Kendrick	L 2–5	2,418	13–9–3 (9–5–3)
January 31	7:05 pm	at Air Force		Cadet Ice Arena • Air Force Academy, Colorado	FloHockey	Kendrick	L 0–2	2,399	13–10–3 (9–6–3)
February 6	7:00 pm	Mercyhurst		Martire Family Arena • Fairfield, Connecticut	FloHockey	Kendrick	W 5–1	2,316	14–10–3 (10–6–3)
February 7	3:00 pm	Mercyhurst		Martire Family Arena • Fairfield, Connecticut	FloHockey	Kendrick	L 1–2	3,427	14–11–3 (10–7–3)
February 13	7:00 pm	at Bentley		Bentley Arena • Waltham, Massachusetts	FloHockey	Kendrick	W 4–0	1,511	15–11–3 (11–7–3)
February 14	6:00 pm	at Bentley		Bentley Arena • Waltham, Massachusetts	FloHockey	Kendrick	L 1–5	1,218	15–12–3 (11–8–3)
February 20	7:00 pm	Holy Cross		Martire Family Arena • Fairfield, Connecticut	FloHockey	Gundarah	W 5–1	2,858	16–12–3 (12–8–3)
February 21	6:00 pm	Holy Cross		Martire Family Arena • Fairfield, Connecticut	FloHockey	Gundarah	W 5–2	3,750	17–12–3 (13–8–3)
February 27	7:00 pm	at Army		Tate Rink • West Point, New York	FloHockey	Gundarah	W 3–2	1,893	18–12–3 (14–8–3)
February 28	4:00 pm	at Army		Tate Rink • West Point, New York	FloHockey	Kendrick	W 4–3	2,586	19–12–3 (15–8–3)
Atlantic Hockey America Tournament
March 6	7:00 pm	Niagara*		Martire Family Arena • Fairfield, Connecticut (AHA Quarterfinal Game 1)	FloHockey	Gundarah	W 3–1	1,374	20–12–3
March 7	5:00 pm	Niagara*		Martire Family Arena • Fairfield, Connecticut (AHA Quarterfinal Game 2)	FloHockey	Gundarah	W 2–1	1,613	21–12–3
March 13	7:00 pm	Robert Morris*		Martire Family Arena • Fairfield, Connecticut (AHA Semifinal Game 1)	FloHockey	Gundarah	W 5–1	2,519	22–12–3
March 14	5:00 pm	Robert Morris*		Martire Family Arena • Fairfield, Connecticut (AHA Semifinal Game 2)	FloHockey	Gundarah	L 2–5	3,156	22–13–3
March 15	5:00 pm	Robert Morris*		Martire Family Arena • Fairfield, Connecticut (AHA Semifinal Game 3)	FloHockey	Gundarah	W 5–0	2,610	23–13–3
March 21	7:00 pm	at Bentley*		Bentley Arena • Waltham, Massachusetts (AHA Championship)	FloHockey	Gundarah	L 2–3	2,500	23–14–3
*Non-conference game. ^{#}Rankings from USCHO.com Poll. All times are in Eastern Time. Source:

== Scoring statistics ==
Name	Position	Games	Goals	Assists	Points	PIM
Félix Trudeau	LW	39	25	23	48	87
Marcus Joughin	F	40	8	26	34	40
Mikey Adamson	D	40	4	30	34	18
Reid Pabich	C	40	15	18	33	14
Gavin Bryant	C	34	10	11	21	10
Stéphane Huard	C	35	6	14	20	38
Noah Ellis	D	40	9	10	19	12
Ray Fust	LW/RW	39	8	10	18	4
Vitaly Levyy	F	39	8	8	16	4
Aiden VanRooyan	D	39	3	13	16	24
John Driscoll	D	40	4	7	11	12
Ethan Wolthers	F	38	4	5	9	14
Michael Rubin	D	36	3	5	8	16
Joshua Barnes	C	21	3	3	6	2
Cole Galata	F	36	3	3	6	14
Jake Bongo	F	37	1	5	6	4
Jack Hillier	F	23	1	3	4	6
Charles-Edward Tardif	C	22	0	4	4	29
Liam Lesakowski	D	34	1	2	3	44
Noah Van Vliet	D	13	0	3	3	10
Jacob Hewitt	F	19	0	3	3	12
Jérémi Tremblay	F	19	0	3	3	14
Paul Minnehan	F	12	2	0	2	4
David Brandes	D	6	0	1	1	0
Jack Spicer	G	1	0	0	0	0
Luke Amell	D/F	4	0	0	0	0
Chase Ramsay	D	16	0	0	0	2
Teagan Kendrick	G	20	0	0	0	0
Ajeet Gundarah	G	22	0	0	0	0
Total			118	210	328	440

== Goaltending statistics ==
Name	Games	Minutes	Wins	Losses	Ties	Goals against	Saves	Shut-outs	SV %	GAA
Jack Spicer	1	1:51	0	0	0	0	2	0	1.000	0.00
Ajeet Gundarah	22	1260:57	13	7	1	44	570	2	.928	2.09
Teagan Kendrick	20	1142:27	10	7	2	46	531	2	.920	2.42
Empty Net	-	13:44	-	-	-	6	-	-	-	-
Total	40	2418:59	23	14	3	96	1103	4	.915	2.38

== Rankings ==
Ranking movements Legend: ██ Increase in ranking ██ Decrease in ranking — = Not ranked RV = Received votes
	Week																											
Poll	Pre	1	2	3	4	5	6	7	8	9	10	11	12	13	14	15	16	17	18	19	20	21	22	23	24	25	26	Final
USCHO.com	RV	RV	RV	—	RV	—	—	—	—	—	—	—	*	—	—	—	—	—	—	—	—	RV	RV	RV	RV	RV		
USA Hockey	RV	—	RV	—	RV	—	—	—	RV	—	—	—	*	—	—	—	—	—	—	—	—	—	—	—	RV	—		

Note: USCHO did not release a week 12 poll
Note: USA Hockey did not release a week 12 poll
