= 2025–26 Robert Morris Colonials men's ice hockey season =

- Conference: T–3rd AHA
- Home ice: Clearview Arena

Rankings
- USCHO: NR
- USA Hockey: NR

Record
- Overall: 16–21–3
- Conference: 13–11–2
- Home: 9–7–2
- Road: 7–14–1

Coaches and captains
- Head coach: Derek Schooley
- Assistant coaches: Marco Treviño; Jacob Zab; Vincent Pietrangelo
- Captain(s): Michael Craig; Cameron Garvey; Tanner Klimpke

The 2025–26 Robert Morris Colonials men's ice hockey season was the 20th season of play for the program and the 2nd in Atlantic Hockey America. The Colonials represented Robert Morris University in the 2025–26 NCAA Division I men's ice hockey season, played their home games at the Clearview Arena and were coached by Derek Schooley in his 20th season.

== Season ==
In addition to the new crop of recruits and transfers, Robert Morris received a boon when Jackson Reineke returned from an injury that cost him the entirety of the previous season. While his presence would prove to be a boon for the offense over the course of the season, RMU had trouble getting on track early on. Neither the offense nor the defense played well at first with the team going 2–9–1 prior to Thanksgiving. Charlie Schenkel, the team's starting goaltender, was inconsistent in the first six weeks of the campaign, however, the brief appearances by both Croix Kochendorfer and Lucas Massie did not recommend a change in goal at the time. To add to their troubled, the Colonials had difficulty scoring on the nights when they did get a solid performance in goal. The end result was that Robert Morris failed to win a single non-conference game which, though it would not affect them in the standings, would be a drag on their national ranking.

The team's subpar play continued into the second half of the season and was setting up to be one of the worst in recent memory. Kochendorfer was given his shot as the starter in early January. While he didn't perform too poorly, he was unable to get a single win for the team. The club then turned to Massie and saw an immediate chance in their fortunes. Massie won three consecutive matches, two by shutout, and helped to completely turn around the Colonials' season. Not only did the team start winning thanks to improvements in goal by both Massie and Schenkel, but the offense stated to increase its output as well. Over the final 13 games, RMU went 9–3–1 and rocketed up the conference standings. Despite winning just 4 times in their first 21 games, the Colonials finished with a respectable record and were able to earn a home site for the conference Quarterfinals.

Facing Air Force first, RMU got into a pitched battle with the falcons and were able to force overtime after getting down by 2 goals entering the third. Schenkel stopped 48 shots in the game but the final one got by him in the second extra period. With their season on the line, Schenkel girded his loins and held off Air Force for the rest of the series. After turning aside 33 shots in the rematch, he was bombarded in the third game to the tune of 62 shots in regulation. The freshman netminder turned in his best performance to date and stopped 60 shots, including a career high 27 saves in the second period. RMU was able to capitalize on its opportunities though it was the two goals by Michael Felsing that proved to be the difference makers. The Colonials snatched victory from Air Force and advanced to the semifinals for the first time in seven years.

Robert Morris got off to a good start against Sacred Heart and took a one-goal lead into the second period thanks to Ryan Taylor. Unfortunately, the team was unable to hold of the attack by the Pioneers and found themselves behind less than two minutes into the middle frame. The club could not summon any additional offense for the remainder of the match and were easily swept off the ice in the first game. Once again facing elimination, the Colonials rebounded thanks to a pair of goals by co-captains Tanner Klimpke and Cameron Garvey. With the series tied, RMU was just one win away from the championship game but their luck finally ran out in the third game of the series. Sacred Heart scored three times in the first period to take a commanding lead and Robert Morris could not break through afterwards. Despite firing 33 shots on goal in the final 40 minutes of the game, not a single puck found its way into the Pioneer cage. Two more goals from SHU in the final frame extended the lead for the home team but with RMU unable to find any offense the final outcome had already been decided.

== Departures ==
Player	Position	Nationality	Cause
Eric DeDobbelaer	Forward	Canada	Graduation (retired)
Mitchel Deelstra	Forward	Canada	Graduation (signed with Reading Royals)
Thomas Gangl	Defenseman	Canada	Transferred to Toronto
Gavin Gulash	Forward	United States	Graduation (retired)
Thomas Haynes	Defenseman	Canada	Left program (retired)
Trevor LeDonne	Defenseman	Canada	Graduation (signed with Allen Americans)
Dylan Meilun	Goaltender	Canada	Transferred to Carleton
Cody Monds	Forward	Canada	Graduation (signed with HYS The Hague)
Adam O'Marra	Forward	Canada	Transferred to Toronto Metropilitan
Dawson Smith	Goaltender	Canada	Transferred to York
Walter Zacher	Forward	United States	Transferred to Canisius

== Recruiting ==
Player	Position	Nationality	Age	Notes
John Babcock	Defenseman	Canada	21	North Vancouver, BC
Julian Beaumont	Forward	United States	21	Allen, TX
Dario Beljo	Forward	Canada	22	Sudbury, ON; transfer from American International
Rasmus Larsson	Defenseman	Sweden	21	Hässelby, SWE; transfer from Northern Michigan; selected 152nd in 2023
Lucas Massie	Goaltender	United States	22	Claremont, CA; transfer from Union
Bruce McDonald	Forward	Canada	20	Ottawa, ON
Zeke Nicholson	Forward	Canada	21	Vancouver, BC
Luca Primerano	Forward	Canada	21	North Vancouver, BC
Charlie Schenkel	Goaltender	Canada	20	Toronto, ON
Ryan Taylor	Forward	United States	22	St. Louis, MO; transfer from Clarkson
Max Wattvil	Defenseman	Sweden	23	Stockholm, SWE; transfer from Merrimack

== Roster ==
As of August 3, 2025.

No.	Nat.	Player	Class	Pos	Height	Weight	DoB	Hometown	Previous team	NHL rights
1	(United States)	Croix Kochendorfer	Sophomore	G	6' 4" (1.93 m)	223 lb (101 kg)	2003-10-13	Saint Paul, Minnesota	Aberdeen Wings (NAHL)	—
2	(Canada)	Michael Craig (C)	Junior	D	5' 10" (1.78 m)	174 lb (79 kg)	2002-08-26	St. Catharines, Ontario	Nanaimo Clippers (BCHL)	—
3	(United States)	Dominic Elliott	Sophomore	D	5' 10" (1.78 m)	176 lb (80 kg)	2004-01-26	Allendale, Michigan	Oklahoma Warriors (NAHL)	—
4	(United States)	Greg Japchen	Senior	D	6' 4" (1.93 m)	205 lb (93 kg)	2001-12-17	Doylestown, Pennsylvania	Stonehill (ECAC)	—
5	(United States)	Luke van Why	Junior	D	5' 10" (1.78 m)	163 lb (74 kg)	2003-01-21	Hatfield, Pennsylvania	Maryland Black Bears (NAHL)	—
6	(Sweden)	Rasmus Larsson	Sophomore	D	6' 3" (1.91 m)	203 lb (92 kg)	2004-02-09	Hässelby, Sweden	Northern Michigan (CCHA)	NYR, 152nd overall 2023
7	(Canada)	John Babcock	Freshman	D	6' 2" (1.88 m)	205 lb (93 kg)	2004-04-25	North Vancouver, British Columbia	Regina Pats (WHL)	—
8	(United States)	Gabriel Lunn	Junior	D	6' 0" (1.83 m)	190 lb (86 kg)	2003-08-25	Lockport, New York	Johnstown Tomahawks (NAHL)	—
7	(Sweden)	Max Wattvil	Junior	D	6' 2" (1.88 m)	192 lb (87 kg)	2002-08-11	Stockholm, Sweden	Merrimack (HEA)	—
10	(Canada)	J. R. Ashmead	Sophomore	D	6' 2" (1.88 m)	181 lb (82 kg)	2003-03-23	Calgary, Alberta	Bonnyville Pontiacs (AJHL)	—
11	(Canada)	Dario Beljo	Junior	F	6' 3" (1.91 m)	190 lb (86 kg)	2002-08-15	Greater Sudbury, Ontario	American International (AHA)	—
12	(United States)	Jackson Reineke	Junior	F	5' 10" (1.78 m)	174 lb (79 kg)	2002-10-03	Faribault, Minnesota	Anchorage Wolverines (USHL)	—
14	(United States)	Julian Beaumont	Freshman	F	5' 8" (1.73 m)	161 lb (73 kg)	2004-02-23	Allen, Texas	Bismarck Bobcats (NAHL)	—
15	(United States)	Connor Gourley	Sophomore	F	6' 2" (1.88 m)	170 lb (77 kg)	2004-07-28	Calgary, Alberta	Okotoks Oilers (BCHL)	—
16	(Canada)	George Krotiris	Junior	F	5' 11" (1.8 m)	165 lb (75 kg)	2002-08-08	Markham, Ontario	Cobourg Cougars (OJHL)	—
17	(United States)	Patrick Johnson	Sophomore	F	5' 8" (1.73 m)	187 lb (85 kg)	2003-06-30	Chesterfield, Missouri	Bismarck Bobcats (NAHL)	—
18	(Canada)	Bruce McDonald	Freshman	F	6' 0" (1.83 m)	176 lb (80 kg)	2004-12-18	Ottawa, Ontario	Owen Sound Attack (OHL)	—
19	(Canada)	Tanner Klimpke (C)	Junior	F	6' 2" (1.88 m)	174 lb (79 kg)	2002-12-13	Calgary, Alberta	Whitecourt Wolverines (AJHL)	—
20	(Canada)	McKay Hayes	Junior	F	6' 2" (1.88 m)	205 lb (93 kg)	2002-01-27	Ancaster, Ontario	Markham Royals (OJHL)	—
21	(Canada)	Cameron Garvey (C)	Junior	F	6' 0" (1.83 m)	181 lb (82 kg)	2002-12-13	Oakville, Ontario	Collingwood Blues (OJHL)	—
22	(United States)	Ryan Taylor	Senior	F	6' 3" (1.91 m)	210 lb (95 kg)	2001-03-19	St. Peters, Missouri	Clarkson (ECAC)	—
23	(Canada)	Zeke Nicholson	Freshman	F	6' 0" (1.83 m)	181 lb (82 kg)	2004-04-09	Vancouver, British Columbia	Alberni Valley Bulldogs (BCHL)	—
26	(United States)	Braden Rourke	Sophomore	F	6' 0" (1.83 m)	172 lb (78 kg)	2004-07-20	Des Moines, Iowa	Des Moines Buccaneers (USHL)	—
27	(Canada)	Trent Wilson	Sophomore	F	6' 1" (1.85 m)	187 lb (85 kg)	2004-06-24	Tsawwassen, British Columbia	West Kelowna Warriors (BCHL)	—
29	(United States)	Michael Felsing	Sophomore	F	5' 11" (1.8 m)	181 lb (82 kg)	2003-02-11	Pittsburgh, Pennsylvania	Merritt Centennials (BCHL)	—
30	(United States)	Lucas Massie	Sophomore	G	6' 1" (1.85 m)	190 lb (86 kg)	2003-04-11	Claremont, California	Union (ECAC)	—
31	(Canada)	Charlie Schenkel	Freshman	G	6' 5" (1.96 m)	205 lb (93 kg)	2004-08-16	Toronto, Ontario	Kingston Frontenacs (OHL)	—
33	(Canada)	Lee Chiang	Junior	F	5' 9" (1.75 m)	170 lb (77 kg)	2002-12-07	Toronto, Ontario	Markham Royals (OJHL)	—
44	(Canada)	Luca Primerano	Freshman	F	6' 2" (1.88 m)	190 lb (86 kg)	2005-03-17	North Vancouver, British Columbia	Cowichan Valley Capitals (BCHL)	—

== Standings ==
2025–26 Atlantic Hockey America Standings
	Conference record										Overall record					
	GP	W	L	T	OW	OL	SW	PTS	GF	GA	GP	W	L	T	GF	GA
#20 Bentley †*	26	16	6	4	1	0	2	53	85	56	39	23	11	5	122	89
Sacred Heart	26	15	8	3	1	0	1	48	80	61	40	23	14	3	118	96
Robert Morris	26	13	11	2	0	2	2	45	69	69	40	16	21	3	103	128
Holy Cross	26	14	10	2	1	1	1	45	81	69	38	18	18	2	113	116
RIT	26	13	11	2	2	1	2	42	69	68	36	17	17	2	93	96
Air Force	26	13	10	3	2	1	0	41	75	73	37	18	15	4	108	112
Canisius	26	12	12	2	1	0	2	39	81	74	35	17	16	2	107	105
Niagara	26	9	16	1	1	3	0	30	67	83	37	13	23	1	93	118
Army	26	7	15	4	2	3	2	28	61	75	35	12	17	6	91	96
Mercyhurst	26	5	18	3	0	0	1	19	47	87	37	6	28	3	65	143
Championship: March 21, 2026 † indicates conference regular season champion (DeGregorio Trophy) * indicates conference tournament champion (Riley Trophy); Rankings: USCHO.com Top 20 Poll; updated March 22, 2026; Source: AHA

== Schedule and results ==
Date	Time	Opponent^{#}	Rank^{#}	Site	TV	Decision	Result	Attendance	Record
Exhibition
October 4	6:07 pm	at Bowling Green*		Slater Family Ice Arena • Bowling Green, Ohio (Exhibition)	Midco Sports+		W 4–1		
October 5	4:00 pm	Waterloo*		Clearview Arena • Neville Township, Pennsylvania (Exhibition)	FloHockey		W 6–2		
Regular Season
October 16	7:00 pm	at #4 Michigan*		Yost Ice Arena • Ann Arbor, Michigan	BTN+	Schenkel	L 2–4	5,191	0–1–0
October 17	7:00 pm	at #4 Michigan*		Yost Ice Arena • Ann Arbor, Michigan	BTN+	Schenkel	L 2–10	5,800	0–2–0
October 24	7:00 pm	at Notre Dame*		Compton Family Ice Arena • Notre Dame, Indiana	Peacock	Schenkel	L 3–6	4,054	0–3–0
October 25	6:00 pm	at Notre Dame*		Compton Family Ice Arena • Notre Dame, Indiana	Peacock	Schenkel	T 2–2 ^{OT}	4,162	0–3–1
October 31	7:00 pm	Niagara		Clearview Arena • Neville Township, Pennsylvania	FloHockey	Schenkel	W 4–2	587	1–3–1 (1–0–0)
November 1	6:00 pm	at Niagara		Dwyer Arena • Lewiston, New York	FloHockey	Schenkel	W 4–3	619	2–3–1 (2–0–0)
November 7	7:00 pm	Long Island*		Clearview Arena • Neville Township, Pennsylvania	FloHockey	Schenkel	L 3–6	675	2–4–1
November 8	7:00 pm	Long Island*		Clearview Arena • Neville Township, Pennsylvania	FloHockey	Schenkel	L 0–2	581	2–5–1
November 14	7:00 pm	RIT		Clearview Arena • Neville Township, Pennsylvania	FloHockey	Schenkel	L 1–2	512	2–6–1 (2–1–0)
November 15	7:00 pm	RIT		Clearview Arena • Neville Township, Pennsylvania	FloHockey	Schenkel	L 2–3	512	2–7–1 (2–2–0)
November 21	7:10 pm	at Lindenwood*		Centene Community Ice Center • St. Charles, Missouri		Schenkel	L 2–6	1,416	2–8–1
November 22	6:10 pm	at Lindenwood*		Centene Community Ice Center • St. Charles, Missouri		Massie	L 3–5	1,489	2–9–1
November 28	7:00 pm	at Mercyhurst		Mercyhurst Ice Center • Erie, Pennsylvania	FloHockey	Schenkel	W 3–1	326	3–9–1 (3–2–0)
November 29	7:00 pm	Mercyhurst		Clearview Arena • Neville Township, Pennsylvania	FloHockey	Schenkel	T 1–1 ^{SOW}	412	3–9–2 (3–2–1)
December 5	9:00 pm	at Air Force		Cadet Ice Arena • Air Force Academy, Colorado	FloHockey, Altitude 2	Schenkel	L 1–4	2,280	3–10–2 (3–3–1)
December 6	7:00 pm	at Air Force		Cadet Ice Arena • Air Force Academy, Colorado	FloHockey, Altitude	Schenkel	W 6–3	2,412	4–10–2 (4–3–1)
December 30	4:00 pm	at Sacred Heart		Martire Family Arena • Fairfield, Connecticut	FloHockey	Schenkel	L 2–5	2,524	4–11–2 (4–4–1)
January 3	4:00 pm	Sacred Heart		Clearview Arena • Neville Township, Pennsylvania	FloHockey	Kochendorfer	L 1–3	724	4–12–2 (4–5–1)
January 9	7:00 pm	at RIT		Gene Polisseni Center • Henrietta, New York	FloHockey, SNP	Schenkel	L 1–4	2,208	4–13–2 (4–6–1)
January 10	5:00 pm	at RIT		Gene Polisseni Center • Henrietta, New York	FloHockey, SNP	Kochendorfer	L 2–3 ^{OT}	2,833	4–14–2 (4–7–1)
January 16	7:00 pm	at Army		Tate Rink • West Point, New York	FloHockey	Kochendorfer	L 2–3 ^{OT}	2,288	4–15–2 (4–8–1)
January 17	4:00 pm	at Army		Tate Rink • West Point, New York	FloHockey	Massie	W 3–0	2,243	5–15–2 (5–8–1)
January 23	7:00 pm	Holy Cross		Clearview Arena • Neville Township, Pennsylvania	FloHockey	Massie	W 5–2	1,045	6–15–2 (6–8–1)
January 24	7:00 pm	Holy Cross		Clearview Arena • Neville Township, Pennsylvania	FloHockey	Massie	W 1–0	567	7–15–2 (7–8–1)
January 30	7:00 pm	Bentley		Clearview Arena • Neville Township, Pennsylvania	FloHockey	Massie	L 0–5	373	7–16–2 (7–9–1)
January 31	7:00 pm	Bentley		Clearview Arena • Neville Township, Pennsylvania	FloHockey	Schenkel	T 3–3 ^{SOW}	412	7–16–3 (7–9–2)
February 6	7:00 pm	Canisius		Clearview Arena • Neville Township, Pennsylvania	FloHockey	Schenkel	W 1–0	724	8–16–3 (8–9–2)
February 7	7:00 pm	Canisius		Clearview Arena • Neville Township, Pennsylvania	FloHockey	Massie	W 6–4	892	9–16–3 (9–9–2)
February 13	6:00 pm	at Niagara		Dwyer Arena • Lewiston, New York	FloHockey	Schenkel	L 2–5	640	9–17–3 (9–10–2)
February 14	7:00 pm	Niagara		Clearview Arena • Neville Township, Pennsylvania	FloHockey	Massie	W 5–1	848	10–17–3 (10–10–2)
February 20	7:00 pm	at Canisius		LECOM Harborcenter • Buffalo, New York	FloHockey	Schenkel	W 4–1	796	11–17–3 (11–10–2)
February 21	7:00 pm	at Canisius		LECOM Harborcenter • Buffalo, New York	FloHockey	Massie	L 0–7	796	11–18–3 (11–11–2)
February 27	7:00 pm	at Mercyhurst		Mercyhurst Ice Center • Erie, Pennsylvania	FloHockey	Schenkel	W 5–3	814	12–18–3 (12–11–2)
February 28	7:00 pm	Mercyhurst		Clearview Arena • Neville Township, Pennsylvania	FloHockey	Schenkel	W 4–1	974	13–18–3 (13–11–2)
Atlantic Hockey America Tournament
March 6	7:05 pm	Air Force*		Clearview Arena • Neville Township, Pennsylvania (AHA Quarterfinal Game 1)	FloHockey	Schenkel	L 2–3 ^{2OT}	952	13–19–3
March 7	7:05 pm	Air Force*		Clearview Arena • Neville Township, Pennsylvania (AHA Quarterfinal Game 2)	FloHockey	Schenkel	W 4–1	853	14–19–3
March 8	5:05 pm	Air Force*		Clearview Arena • Neville Township, Pennsylvania (AHA Quarterfinal Game 3)	FloHockey	Schenkel	W 5–2	814	15–19–3
March 13	7:00 pm	at Sacred Heart*		Martire Family Arena • Fairfield, Connecticut (AHA Semifinal Game 1)	FloHockey	Schenkel	L 1–5	2,519	15–20–3
March 14	5:00 pm	at Sacred Heart*		Martire Family Arena • Fairfield, Connecticut (AHA Semifinal Game 2)	FloHockey	Schenkel	W 5–2	3,156	16–20–3
March 15	5:00 pm	at Sacred Heart*		Martire Family Arena • Fairfield, Connecticut (AHA Semifinal Game 3)	FloHockey	Schenkel	L 0–5	2,610	16–21–3
*Non-conference game. ^{#}Rankings from USCHO.com Poll. All times are in Eastern Time. Source:

== Scoring statistics ==
Name	Position	Games	Goals	Assists	Points	PIM
Tanner Klimpke	F	40	16	15	31	20
Jackson Reineke	LW/RW	36	11	15	26	25
Cameron Garvey	C	40	11	14	25	24
Dominic Elliott	D	40	6	13	19	10
Michael Felsing	F	39	8	10	18	20
Bruce McDonald	C/LW	38	3	13	16	12
Ryan Taylor	F	25	6	9	15	4
Trent Wilson	F	37	5	10	15	22
George Krotiris	W	39	5	9	14	16
Patrick Johnson	F	40	5	9	14	25
John Babcock	D	40	4	9	13	18
Michael Craig	D	26	3	10	13	6
Julian Beaumont	LW	27	6	5	11	10
Luke van Why	D	31	3	7	10	18
Braden Rourke	RW	35	3	7	10	20
Gabriel Lunn	D	35	1	7	8	14
Connor Gourley	F	28	2	4	6	27
Dario Beljo	C	26	1	3	4	8
McKay Hayes	C	13	0	4	4	2
Max Wattvil	D	14	1	1	2	8
Rasmus Larsson	D	16	1	1	2	0
Luca Primerano	F	20	1	1	2	2
Greg Japchen	D	32	1	1	2	14
Lee Chiang	F	2	0	1	1	0
Zeke Nicholson	C/LW	12	0	1	1	2
Croix Kochendorfer	G	7	0	0	0	0
Lucas Massie	G	11	0	0	0	0
J. R. Ashmead	D	29	0	0	0	10
Charlie Schenkel	G	30	0	0	0	0
Bench	–	–	–	–	–	10
Total			103	179	282	347

== Goaltending statistics ==
Name	Games	Minutes	Wins	Losses	Ties	Goals Against	Saves	Shut Outs	SV %	GAA
Charlie Schenkel	30	1715:52	11	15	3	80	803	1	.909	2.80
Lucas Massie	12	459:58	5	3	0	22	237	2	.915	2.87
Croix Kochendorfer	9	246:05	0	3	0	18	137	0	.884	4.39
Empty Net	-	24:21	-	-	-	8	-	-	-	-
Total	40	2448:16	16	21	3	128	1177	3	.902	3.14

== Rankings ==
Poll	Week																											
Poll	Pre	1	2	3	4	5	6	7	8	9	10	11	12	13	14	15	16	17	18	19	20	21	22	23	24	25	26	27 (Final)
USCHO.com	NR	NR	NR	NR	NR	NR	NR	NR	NR	NR	NR	NR	–	NR	NR	NR	NR	NR	NR	NR	NR	NR	NR	NR	NR	NR	NR	NR
USA Hockey	NR	NR	NR	NR	NR	NR	NR	NR	NR	NR	NR	NR	–	NR	NR	NR	NR	NR	NR	NR	NR	NR	NR	NR	NR	NR	NR	NR

Note: USCHO did not release a poll in week 12.
Note: USA Hockey did not release a poll in week 12.
