= 2025–26 Atlantic Hockey America men's season =

2025–26 AHA men's season
- Season: 2025–26
- Conference: AHA
- Division: Division I
- Sport: men's ice hockey
- Duration: October 3, 2025– March 21, 2026
- Number of teams: 10
- TV partner(s): FloHockey

Regular season
- Season champions: Bentley
- Season MVP: Félix Trudeau
- Top scorer: Félix Trudeau (33)

Atlantic Hockey America Tournament
- Tournament champions: Bentley
- Runners-up: Sacred Heart
- Tournament MVP: Michael Mesic
- Top scorer: Michael Mesic (8); Kellan Hjartarson

NCAA tournament
- Bids: 1
- Record: 0–1
- Best Finish: Regional Semifinal
- Team(s): Bentley

The 2025–26 Atlantic Hockey America men's season was the 2nd season of play for Atlantic Hockey America and took place during the 2025–26 NCAA Division I men's ice hockey season. The season began on October 3, 2025, and the conference tournament concluded on March 21, 2026.

== Membership changes ==
During the previous season, American International announced that they would be downgrading their program to Division II after the season.

== Coaches ==
- Before the previous season, Brian Riley announced that he would be retiring at the end of the season. Army elected to promote assistant coach Zach McKelvie to the position. This ended an unbroken string of the program being led by the Riley family dating back to 1950.
- After the end of the previous season, Wayne Wilson announced his retirement from coaching. RIT brought back alumnus Matt Thomas as the team's new head coach.

=== Records ===
Team	Head coach	Season at school	Record at school	Atlantic Hockey record
Air Force	Frank Serratore	29	472–457–102	11–13–2
Army	Zach McKelvie	1	0–0–0	0–0–0
Bentley	Andy Jones	3	39–32–4	16–9–1
Canisius	Trevor Large	8	112–142–25	11–13–2
Holy Cross	Bill Riga	5	74–72–11	19–5–2
Mercyhurst	Rick Gotkin	38	611–550–111	4–19–3
Niagara	Jason Lammers	8	113–145–27	16–9–1
RIT	Matt Thomas	1	0–0–0	0–0–0
Robert Morris	Derek Schooley	20	296–320–75	7–15–4
Sacred Heart	C. J. Marottolo	16	209–304–60	16–7–3

== Preseason ==
Coaches were polled prior to the season and asked to both rank member programs as well as vote for an all-conference team. Coaches were not permitted to vote for their own players or teams

=== Poll ===
Rank	Team
1	Sacred Heart (7)
2	Holy Cross (2)
3	Bentley (1)
4	Niagara
5	Army
6	Air Force
7	Canisius
8	RIT
9	Robert Morris
10	Mercyhurst

=== Preseason All-AHA ===
First Team	Position
Ajeet Gundarah, Sacred Heart	G
Chris Hedden, Air Force	D
Mikey Adamson, Sacred Heart	D
Félix Trudeau, Sacred Heart	F
Jack Stockfish *, Holy Cross	F
Devin Phillips, Holy Cross	F

* Preseason Player of the Year.

== Standings ==
2025–26 Atlantic Hockey America Standings
	Conference record										Overall record					
	GP	W	L	T	OW	OL	SW	PTS	GF	GA	GP	W	L	T	GF	GA
#20 Bentley †*	26	16	6	4	1	0	2	53	85	56	40	23	12	5	122	94
Sacred Heart	26	15	8	3	1	0	1	48	80	61	40	23	14	3	118	96
Robert Morris	26	13	11	2	0	2	2	45	69	69	40	16	21	3	103	128
Holy Cross	26	14	10	2	1	1	1	45	81	69	38	18	18	2	113	116
RIT	26	13	11	2	2	1	2	42	69	68	36	17	17	2	93	96
Air Force	26	13	10	3	2	1	0	41	75	73	37	18	15	4	108	112
Canisius	26	12	12	2	1	0	2	39	81	74	35	17	16	2	107	105
Niagara	26	9	16	1	1	3	0	30	67	83	37	13	23	1	93	118
Army	26	7	15	4	2	3	2	28	61	75	35	12	17	6	91	96
Mercyhurst	26	5	18	3	0	0	1	19	47	87	37	6	28	3	65	143
Championship: March 21, 2026 † indicates conference regular season champion (DeGregorio Trophy) * indicates conference tournament champion (Riley Trophy); Rankings: USCHO.com Top 20 Poll; updated April 15, 2026; Source: AHA

=== Regular season record ===
Team	Big Ten	CCHA	ECAC Hockey	Hockey East	Independent	NCHC	Total
Air Force	0–0–0	2–1–0	2–0–0	0–0–0	0–0–0	0–2–1	4–3–1
Army	0–0–0	0–0–0	0–1–1	4–0–0	1–0–1	0–0–0	5–1–2
Bentley	0–0–0	0–0–0	1–0–1	0–2–0	1–1–0	0–2–0	2–5–1
Canisius	0–0–0	0–0–0	3–1–0	0–0–0	2–2–0	0–0–0	5–3–0
Holy Cross	0–0–0	0–0–0	0–2–0	0–4–0	2–0–0	0–0–0	2–6–0
Mercyhurst	0–2–0	0–0–0	0–2–0	0–2–0	0–0–0	0–2–0	0–8–0
Niagara	0–0–0	2–0–0	1–5–0	0–0–0	0–0–0	0–0–0	3–5–0
Robert Morris	0–3–1	0–0–0	0–0–0	0–0–0	0–4–0	0–0–0	0–7–1
RIT	1–1–0	0–0–0	3–1–0	0–0–0	0–0–0	0–1–0	4–3–0
Sacred Heart	1–1–0	0–0–0	1–2–0	0–0–0	1–1–0	0–0–0	3–4–0
Overall	2–7–1	4–1–0	11–14–2	4–8–0	7–8–1	0–7–1	28–45–5

== Statistics ==
=== Leading scorers ===
GP = Games played; G = Goals; A = Assists; Pts = Points; PIM = Penalty minutes

Player	Class	Team	GP	G	A	Pts	PIM
Félix Trudeau	Senior	Sacred Heart	25	16	17	33	46
Jake Black	Senior	Bentley	26	14	17	31	10
Jack Stockfish	Junior	Holy Cross	26	10	15	25	6
Killian Kiecker-Olson	Senior	Canisius	26	8	17	25	22
Stephen Castagna	Senior	Bentley	26	9	15	24	21
Chris Hedden	Senior	Air Force	26	9	15	24	12
Kellan Hjartarson	Junior	Bentley	26	7	17	24	10
Grant Porter	Senior	Canisius	26	7	17	24	8
Walter Zacher	Junior	Canisius	23	13	10	23	16
Nick Sajevic	Sophomore	Air Force	26	6	17	23	18

=== Leading goaltenders ===
Minimum 1/3 of team's minutes played in conference games.
GP = Games played; Min = Minutes played; W = Wins; L = Losses; T = Ties; GA = Goals against; SO = Shutouts; SV% = Save percentage; GAA = Goals against average

Player	Class	Team	GP	Min	W	L	T	GA	SO	SV%	GAA
Nicholas Bevilacqua	Sophomore	Bentley	10	603:59	8	1	1	16	2	.940	1.59
Ajeet Gundarah	Sophomore	Sacred Heart	12	682:44	7	3	1	22	1	.933	1.93
Jakub Krbeček	Sophomore	RIT	24	1395:47	13	10	1	54	0	.912	2.32
Charlie Schenkel	Freshman	Robert Morris	17	1000:18	8	6	2	39	1	.919	2.34
Dominik Wasik	Junior	Air Force	26	1528:06	13	9	3	60	3	.913	2.36

== Conference tournament ==
Note: Teams are reseeded after the First Round and Quarterfinals.

First Round; March 3
7	Canisius	2
10	Mercyhurst	5
8	Niagara	5
9	Army	4

Quarterfinals; March 6–8
1	Bentley	4***	6	-
10	Mercyhurst	3	0	-
2	Sacred Heart	3	2	-
8	Niagara	1	1	-
3	Robert Morris	2	4	5
6	Air Force	3**	1	2
4	Holy Cross	2*	5*	-
5	RIT	1	4	-

Semifinals; March 13–15
1	Bentley	3*	4	-
4	Holy Cross	2	0	-
2	Sacred Heart	5	2	5
3	Robert Morris	1	5	0

Championship; March 21
1	Bentley	3
2	Sacred Heart	2

Note: * denotes overtime period(s)

== NCAA tournament ==
=== Regional semifinals ===
March 27, 2026; 5:30 pm on ESPNU	(1) Michigan	5–1 (2–0, 2–0, 1–1)	(4) Bentley	MVP Arena; Attendance: 6,584

Game reference

Jack Ivankovic
Goalies
Lukas Swedin
Referees:
Cameron Lynch
Jason Williams
Linesmen:
Steve Drain
Adam Wood

(Perron) T. J. Hughes (21) – 9:49	1–0
(unassisted) Ben Robertson (1) – GW – 19:59	2–0
(Perron, Hughes) Nick Moldenhauer (15) – PP – 28:35	3–0
(Hughes, Schifsky) Kason Muscutt (3) – 30:49	4–0
(Duke, Hady) Garrett Schifsky (13) – 57:50	5–0
	5–1	59:33 – David Helledy (6) (Upson, Dalton)

12 min
Penalties
8 min
29
Shots
25

Game summary
Before the game had even started, Michigan announced that their top-line center Michael Hage would miss the game. Bentley kicked off the match with a rush into the Michigan end but they were unable to get a good look at the next. The puck see-sawed up and down the ice but both defenses were able to keep the attackers to the outside for the first several minutes. The first good scoring chance came about three and a half minutes in when Jayden Perron fired a low shot from the right circle but Lukas Swedin made the save with his leg. After a second chance for Michigan from T. J. Hughes was stopped at the 6-minute mark, Bentley got its first good look off of a turnover but Jack Ivankovic was able to stop the attempt from Arlo Merritt. After Bentley was able to put some pressure on the Michigan cage, Michigan countered with a rush and gave Luca Fantilli an open shot on goal. Swedin held firm and snagged the puck with his glove. The middle of the period saw Michigan continually attacking but Bentley's players collapsed back and prevented the Wolverines from setting up in the offensive zone. Just before the midway point of the period, Perron grabbed a clearing attempt with his glove just inside the Bentley zone. He then slid the puck over to Hughes who fired it under Swedin's glove for the game's opening marker. Bentley went on the attack on the ensuing faceoff and drew a hooking call on Dakoda Rheaume-Mullen. Despite some sloppy play from the 39th-ranked penalty kill, Michigan was able to limit Bentley to a low-percentage shots and retain their lead. After the penalty expired, the back and forth play resumed with the two sides limited to singular chances before the puck was either cleared or frozen for a faceoff. Both defenses played hard in their own zones while the attackers were looking more for good scoring chances than just trying to get the puck on goal. With less than 3 minutes left in the period, Michigan was finally able to establish itself in the Falcons' end, however, Bentley kept the Wolverines away from the goal and allowed Swedin to stop a long shot by Tyler Duke from the point. Just before the end of the period, Ben Robertson was carrying the puck out of the Michigan end and he looked up at the clock to check the time. He then skated the puck forward and, as soon as he got to the Bentley blueline, he fired a hard wrist shot between two Falcon defenders. Swedin raised his glove to grab the puck but it sailed just below the outstretched trapper and into the net for a shocking goal, his first of the season.

Now down by 2, Bentley got right back to the attack at the start of the second period. Play again see-sawed between the two sides for the first few minutes but when Chase Davis attempted to collapse down low and help out defensively, he lost and edge and ran into Swedin. Michigan got possession of the puck while the cage was unoccupied but could not get the rubber into a shooting position before Swedin regain his footing. However, in order to prevent an open look at the goal, Tobias Larsen was forced to take a holding penalty. Michigan's #1 power play got several good shots on the Bentley cage but Swedin held firm and the Falcons were able to clear the puck and prevent a follow up chance. After the penalty expired, Jake Black put a hard shot on goal off the rush. Ivankovic made the save but Oliver Salo crashed the crease and bodied the Michigan netminder to the ice. While the Wolverines called for a penalty, none was forthcoming. A few minutes later, Salo was handed a minor penalty when he was called for interference on Kason Muscutt. Michigan's offensive firepower was on full display on their second man-advantage. Will Horcoff and Perron had several good looks on goal but it was Nick Moldenhauer who found the back of the net after the Wolverines completely wore out the Bentley defenders. Bentley went on the attack once more, desperately trying to close the gap and managed to force a couple of offensive zone draws. Michigan, however, did not give the Falcons much to work with. On one of the Wolverines' counters up the ice, the puck was deflected into the corner behind the goal. Hughes jumped on the puck and backhanded out in front, sending the rubber into Muscutt's body where it rebounded towards the goal. While the puck probably would have entered the cage under its own power, Muscutt made sure by smacking it into the back of the net. After exchanging chances, Bentley got its chance on the power play when Duke was called for boarding. While most of the man-advantage went by the wayside, Bentley did get a tremendous scoring chance when Davis fired one on goal from the half wall. Ivankovic made the stop but the puck rebounded off of his stick right onto Salo's stick but the Finnish forward could not get his shot around the Michigan goaltender. Though they failed on their chance, the Falcons kept coming with both David Helledy and Garrett Horsager getting chances for a goal, however, Ivankovic stopped the former and a defensive wall provided by the Michigan skaters stopped the second. After a TV timeout, the Wolverines tilted the game back in their favor but Bentley would not go away. After Ivankovic stopped a Kellan Hjartarson shot, Black was nearly able to get his stick on the biscuit with a yawning cage in front but he overskated the puck. At time was counting down, Drew Schock broke towards the Bentley cage on a partial breakaway but Swedin made the save.

Bentley was again the aggressors at the start of the period but were still unable to get the puck past Ivankovic. However, less than a minute in the Falcons were able to force Cole McKinney into taking a holding call, granting them a third power play. Once again, the Falcons could not take advantage of Michigan's mediocre penalty kill and even surrendered a rush up the ice that saw Swedin having to stop a Garrett Schifsky backhand with his mask. Though Michigan was no longer pinching in the offensive zone, they were nonetheless able to get their shots thanks to Bentley being forced to push everything to the offense. Just before the 5-minute mark, Duke got mixed up behind his own goal with Michael Mesic and both were given roughing minors. The open ice gave both teams a chance to get the puck on goal but no goals were forthcoming. After the penalty box was emptied, Michigan continued to hold Bentley back until the Falcons iced the puck with just over 12 minutes to play. The Wolverines won the ensuing faceoff and Duke found Schifsky with a rink-wide pass and the junior fired the puck under Swedin right arm for Michigan fifth goal. Though the game was all but over by this point, Bentley refused to quit and went right at the Michigan cage. With under 10 minutes to play, Duke was called for holding and gave Bentley a fourth man-advantage. At the end of the power play, Salo put a long shot on goal that got behind Ivankovic but the Michigan goalie was able to cover the puck before any of the Falcons could follow up the attempt. Malcolm Spence had an opportunity to increase Michigan's lead with about 3 minutes to play but his shot hit a discarded stick and jumped up into Swedin's body. Bentley then did their best to finally get on the scoresheet but Ivankovic refused to budge. With 2 minutes left, Swedin was again tested and stopped a hard drive from Schock. In the final minute of play, Spence and Black were whistled for matching interference penalties. With under 30 seconds, Bentley finally broke through when Helledy fired a puck through Ivankovic, ending the shutout bid but the final result was unaffected.

== Rankings ==
=== USCHO ===
Team	Pre	1	2	3	4	5	6	7	8	9	10	11	13	14	15	16	17	18	19	20	21	22	23	24	25	Final
Air Force	NR	NR	NR	NR	NR	NR	NR	NR	NR	NR	NR	NR	NR	NR	NR	NR	NR	NR	NR	NR	NR	NR	NR	NR	NR	NR
Army	NR	NR	NR	NR	NR	NR	NR	NR	NR	NR	NR	NR	NR	NR	NR	NR	NR	NR	NR	NR	NR	NR	NR	NR	NR	NR
Bentley	NR	NR	NR	NR	NR	NR	NR	NR	NR	NR	NR	NR	NR	NR	NR	NR	NR	NR	NR	NR	NR	NR	NR	20	20	20
Canisius	NR	NR	NR	NR	NR	NR	NR	NR	NR	NR	NR	NR	NR	NR	NR	NR	NR	NR	NR	NR	NR	NR	NR	NR	NR	NR
Holy Cross	NR	NR	NR	NR	NR	NR	NR	NR	NR	NR	NR	NR	NR	NR	NR	NR	NR	NR	NR	NR	NR	NR	NR	NR	NR	NR
Mercyhurst	NR	NR	NR	NR	NR	NR	NR	NR	NR	NR	NR	NR	NR	NR	NR	NR	NR	NR	NR	NR	NR	NR	NR	NR	NR	NR
Niagara	NR	NR	NR	NR	NR	NR	NR	NR	NR	NR	NR	NR	NR	NR	NR	NR	NR	NR	NR	NR	NR	NR	NR	NR	NR	NR
RIT	NR	NR	NR	NR	NR	NR	NR	NR	NR	NR	NR	NR	NR	NR	NR	NR	NR	NR	NR	NR	NR	NR	NR	NR	NR	NR
Robert Morris	NR	NR	NR	NR	NR	NR	NR	NR	NR	NR	NR	NR	NR	NR	NR	NR	NR	NR	NR	NR	NR	NR	NR	NR	NR	NR
Sacred Heart	NR	NR	NR	NR	NR	NR	NR	NR	NR	NR	NR	NR	NR	NR	NR	NR	NR	NR	NR	NR	NR	NR	NR	NR	NR	NR

Note: USCHO did not release a poll in week 12 or 26.

=== USA Hockey ===
Team	Pre	1	2	3	4	5	6	7	8	9	10	11	13	14	15	16	17	18	19	20	21	22	23	24	25	26	Final
Air Force	NR	NR	NR	NR	NR	NR	NR	NR	NR	NR	NR	NR	NR	NR	NR	NR	NR	NR	NR	NR	NR	NR	NR	NR	NR	NR	NR
Army	NR	NR	NR	NR	NR	NR	NR	NR	NR	NR	NR	NR	NR	NR	NR	NR	NR	NR	NR	NR	NR	NR	NR	NR	NR	NR	NR
Bentley	NR	NR	NR	NR	NR	NR	NR	NR	NR	NR	NR	NR	NR	NR	NR	NR	NR	NR	NR	NR	NR	NR	NR	NR	20	20	20
Canisius	NR	NR	NR	NR	NR	NR	NR	NR	NR	NR	NR	NR	NR	NR	NR	NR	NR	NR	NR	NR	NR	NR	NR	NR	NR	NR	NR
Holy Cross	NR	NR	NR	NR	NR	NR	NR	NR	NR	NR	NR	NR	NR	NR	NR	NR	NR	NR	NR	NR	NR	NR	NR	NR	NR	NR	NR
Mercyhurst	NR	NR	NR	NR	NR	NR	NR	NR	NR	NR	NR	NR	NR	NR	NR	NR	NR	NR	NR	NR	NR	NR	NR	NR	NR	NR	NR
Niagara	NR	NR	NR	NR	NR	NR	NR	NR	NR	NR	NR	NR	NR	NR	NR	NR	NR	NR	NR	NR	NR	NR	NR	NR	NR	NR	NR
RIT	NR	NR	NR	NR	NR	NR	NR	NR	NR	NR	NR	NR	NR	NR	NR	NR	NR	NR	NR	NR	NR	NR	NR	NR	NR	NR	NR
Robert Morris	NR	NR	NR	NR	NR	NR	NR	NR	NR	NR	NR	NR	NR	NR	NR	NR	NR	NR	NR	NR	NR	NR	NR	NR	NR	NR	NR
Sacred Heart	NR	NR	NR	NR	NR	NR	NR	NR	NR	NR	NR	NR	NR	NR	NR	NR	NR	NR	NR	NR	NR	NR	NR	NR	NR	NR	NR

Note: USA Hockey did not release a poll in week 12.

=== NPI ===
Team	1	2	3	4	5	6	7	8	9	10	11	13	14	15	16	17	18	19	20	21	22	23	24	Final
Air Force	–	–	41	–	–	32	42	34	30	38	39	39	44	42	42	35	36	34	40	34	36	36	37	37
Army	–	–	9	–	–	35	48	51	51	47	46	45	45	50	47	49	48	47	43	45	47	45	45	45
Bentley	–	–	50	–	–	17	39	38	40	41	41	36	27	30	26	26	27	28	25	32	27	25	25	25
Canisius	–	–	21	–	–	37	47	47	49	49	49	48	48	43	37	43	47	46	46	47	49	48	49	48
Holy Cross	–	–	52	–	–	43	30	21	23	22	22	29	34	38	44	44	41	38	44	38	34	38	39	38
Mercyhurst	–	–	57	–	–	63	63	63	63	63	63	63	63	62	63	63	63	63	63	63	63	63	63	63
Niagara	–	–	28	–	–	57	49	48	57	54	54	54	54	59	58	55	55	56	55	55	55	55	55	56
RIT	–	–	46	–	–	19	13	20	33	36	37	38	35	41	39	38	37	33	37	43	44	44	44	44
Robert Morris	–	–	44	–	–	53	56	58	59	57	56	60	57	54	53	53	52	53	52	50	48	47	46	46
Sacred Heart	–	–	33	–	–	52	38	37	37	45	44	43	39	34	33	41	42	39	33	31	26	28	30	31

Note: teams ranked in the top-10 automatically qualify for the NCAA tournament. Teams ranked 11-16 can qualify based upon conference tournament results.
