= Tom Peffall =

American ice hockey coach

Biographical details
- Born: February 19, 1987 (age 39); Ambler, Pennsylvania, USA
- Education: Niagara University

Playing career
- 2005–2007: Philadelphia Little Flyers
- 2007–2008: Philadelphia Thunder
- 2008–2009: Niagara (club)
- 2009–2010: Rhode Island Storm
- 2011: Vermont Wild
- 2012–2013: Trenton Titans
- Position: Center

Coaching career (HC unless noted)
- 2015–2017: Neumann (asst.)
- 2017–2018: Philadelphia Rebels (asst.)
- 2018–2022: Stevenson (asst.)
- 2022–2026: Mercyhurst (asst.)

Tom Peffall (born February 19, 1987) is an American ice hockey head coach and former player. He was the coach in waiting for the men's program at Mercyhurst until is sudden cancellation in March 2026.

== Career ==
Peffall played junior ice hockey in the Philadelphia area, appearing on a pair of lower-level clubs. He briefly attended Niagara University, appearing in seven games with the school's club team during the 2008–09 season. Afterwards, he played for three low-level minor professional teams over the next four years before his playing career came to a close in 2013.

His coaching career began a couple of years later when he joined Neumann as an assistant coach. In 2018, after a brief stint with the Philadelphia Rebels, he transitioned into a similar role with Stevenson. His time with the Mustangs resulted in the program raising its profile in Division III hockey, posting a record in 48–18–4 in his final three years there while also serving as director of recruiting. The team's steady performance earned him enough notoriety to transition to the Division I level in 2022. Peffall spent four years as an assistant coach with Mercyhurst before becoming the team's head coach following the retirement of Rick Gotkin in 2026.

Just before Peffall was set to take over as head coach, the Mercyhurst announced that it was discontinuing the men's program effective immediately.
