= Bentley Arena =

Ice hockey arena in Waltham, Massachusetts

Coordinates: 42.383305°N 71.222455°W

- Interactive map of Bentley Arena
- Location: 400 Beaver St; Waltham, Massachusetts
- Owner: Bentley University
- Operator: Bentley University
- Capacity: Ice Hockey: 1,917; Concerts: 3,626
- Surface: Ice
- Field size: 200x85ft

Construction
- Groundbreaking: September 2016
- Opened: February 16, 2018

Tenant
- Bentley Falcons (men's hockey) (2018–present)

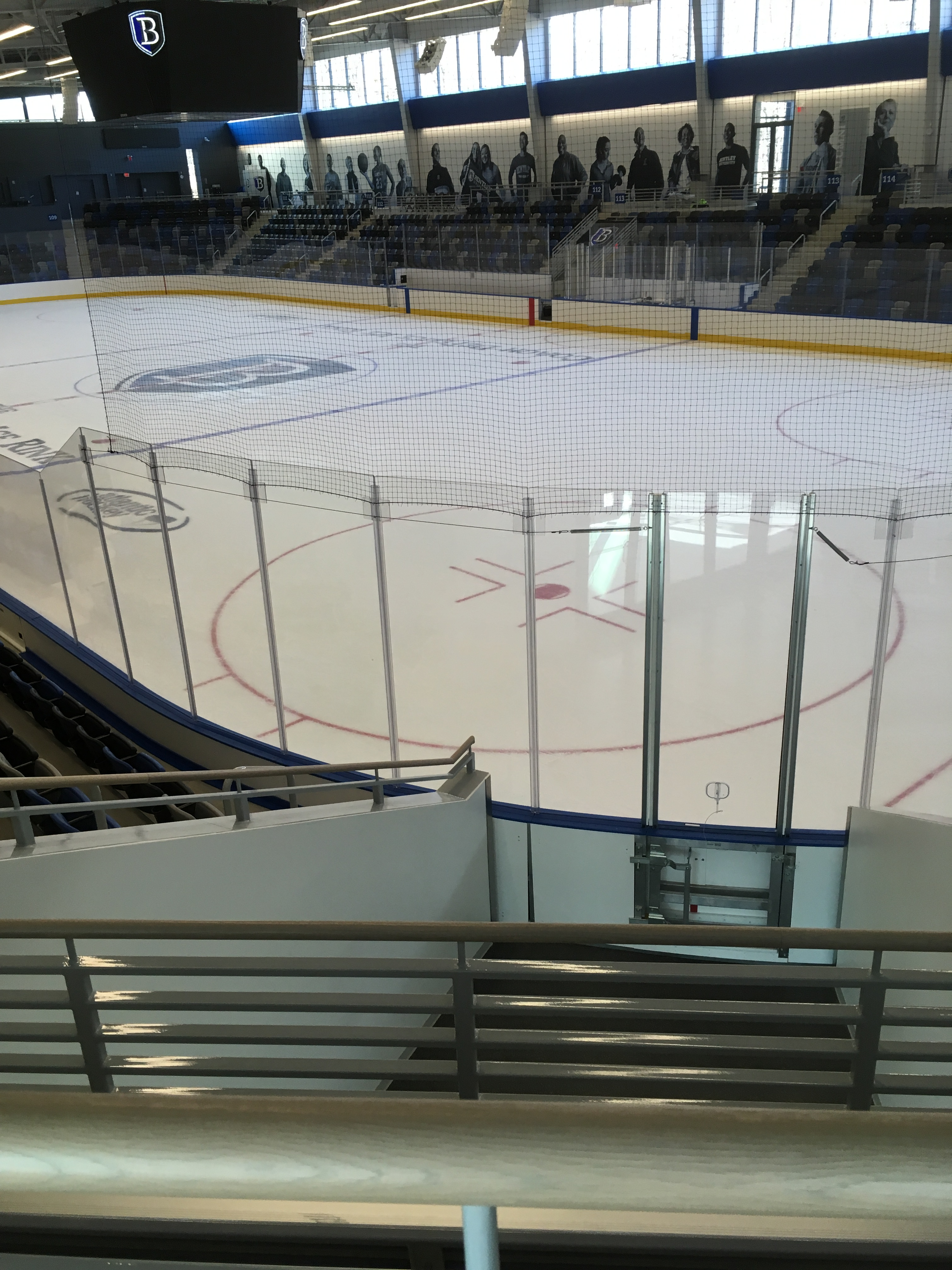

The Bentley Arena is an ice hockey arena on the campus of Bentley University in Waltham, Massachusetts. It is home to the Bentley Falcons men's ice hockey program, replacing the previous facility, the John A. Ryan Arena. The first hockey game was on February 16, 2018 with Bentley taking on Army West Point. The total capacity for hockey games is 2,240.

The 76,000 square foot facility was designed by Architectural Resources Cambridge and built by Suffolk Construction. Ground broke on the Arena in the summer of 2016, and was completed in February 2018.

In May 2018, the Arena was awarded an LEED Platinum rating, the highest possible rating for sustainability, according to the U.S. Green Building Council.

Since opening, the arena has hosted various events, such as Bentley's annual Spring Day concert.

== Notable games ==
Date	Away	Score	Home	Attendance
October 26, 2019	New York Rangers Alumni	5-2	Boston Bruins Alumni	
