= Air Force Academy, Colorado =

Unincorporated community in Colorado, US

- Census-designated place
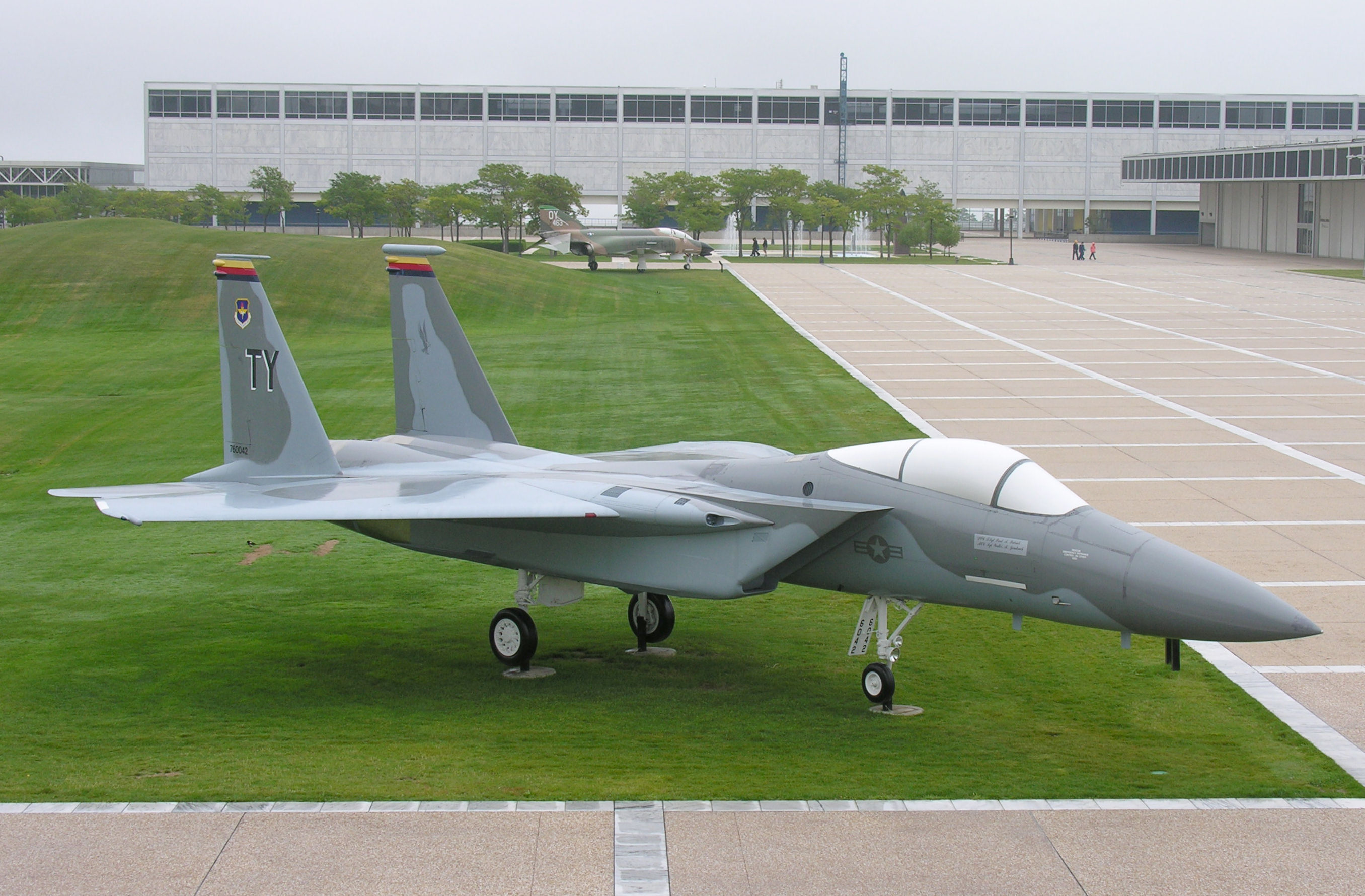
- F-15 Eagle on display

- Location of the Air Force Academy CDP in El Paso County, Colorado
- Coordinates: 38°59′39″N 104°51′50″W
- Country: United States
- State: Colorado
- County: El Paso County

Government
  - Type: Unincorporated community

Area
  - Total: 9.99 sq mi (25.87 km^{2})
  - Land: 9.99 sq mi (25.87 km^{2})
  - Water: 0 sq mi (0.00 km^{2})
- Elevation: 6,779 ft (2,066 m)

Population (2020)
  - Total: 6,608
  - Density: 661.6/sq mi (255.4/km^{2})
- Time zone: UTC-7 (MST)
  - Summer (DST): UTC-6 (MDT)
- ZIP Code: United States Air Force Academy 80840 and 80841
- Area code: 719
- GNIS feature ID: 2407701

Air Force Academy is a census-designated place (CDP) located in El Paso County, Colorado, United States. The CDP includes the developed portion of the United States Air Force Academy, including the cadet housing facilities. The CDP is a part of the Colorado Springs, CO Metropolitan Statistical Area. The Air Force Academy post office (ZIP Codes 80840 and 80841 [for post office boxes]) serves the area. At the 2020 United States census, the population of the Air Force Academy CDP was 6,680.

== Geography ==
Air Force Academy CDP has an area of 6,393 acres (25.873 km^{2}), all land.

== Facilities and access ==
The General Bradley and Zita Hosmer Visitor Center opened outside the Academy's North Gate to the public on May 16, 2026. It is described as an interactive showcase focusing on the Academy's 47-month cadet experience, giving visitors insight into the careers graduates can expect. It is part of TrueNorth Commons, a development located outside the northern security checkpoint that includes the visitor center, Hotel Polaris a conference center and office space.

In March 2026, the Academy suspended its Trusted Traveler program, requiring visitors without Department of Defense identification to obtain sponsored passes for installation access.

== Events ==
The Academy's annual graduation ceremony is held at Falcon Stadium, which is located on Academy grounds. On May 28, 2026, the Academy commissioned 931 cadets as Second Lieutenants. The previous year, 909 cadets in the Class of 2025 received commissions at Falcon Stadium. The Academy's Class of 2029 arrived for in-processing on June 25, 2025. The Academy later reported that 1,112 appointees took the Oath of Office to become basic cadets.

== Demographics ==
The United States Census Bureau initially defined the Air Force Academy CDP for the 1980 United States census.

Air Force Academy CDP, Colorado
| Year | Pop. | ±% |
|---|---|---|
| 1980 | 8,655 | — |
| 1990 | 9,062 | +4.7% |
| 2000 | 7,526 | −16.9% |
| 2010 | 6,680 | −11.2% |
| 2020 | 6,608 | −1.1% |
Source: United States Census Bureau

=== 2020 census ===
As of the 2020 census, Air Force Academy had a population of 6,608. The median age was 21.1 years. 12.7% of residents were under the age of 18 and 0.7% of residents were 65 years of age or older. For every 100 females there were 192.5 males, and for every 100 females age 18 and over there were 209.3 males age 18 and over.

0.0% of residents lived in urban areas, while 100.0% lived in rural areas.

There were 661 households in Air Force Academy, of which 61.9% had children under the age of 18 living in them. Of all households, 72.8% were married-couple households, 13.0% were households with a male householder and no spouse or partner present, and 13.9% were households with a female householder and no spouse or partner present. About 14.8% of all households were made up of individuals and 1.9% had someone living alone who was 65 years of age or older.

There were 803 housing units, of which 17.7% were vacant. The homeowner vacancy rate was 0.0% and the rental vacancy rate was 14.2%.

Racial composition as of the 2020 census
| Race | Number | Percent |
|---|---|---|
| White | 4,719 | 71.4% |
| Black or African American | 533 | 8.1% |
| American Indian and Alaska Native | 41 | 0.6% |
| Asian | 408 | 6.2% |
| Native Hawaiian and Other Pacific Islander | 50 | 0.8% |
| Some other race | 373 | 5.6% |
| Two or more races | 484 | 7.3% |
| Hispanic or Latino (of any race) | 935 | 14.1% |

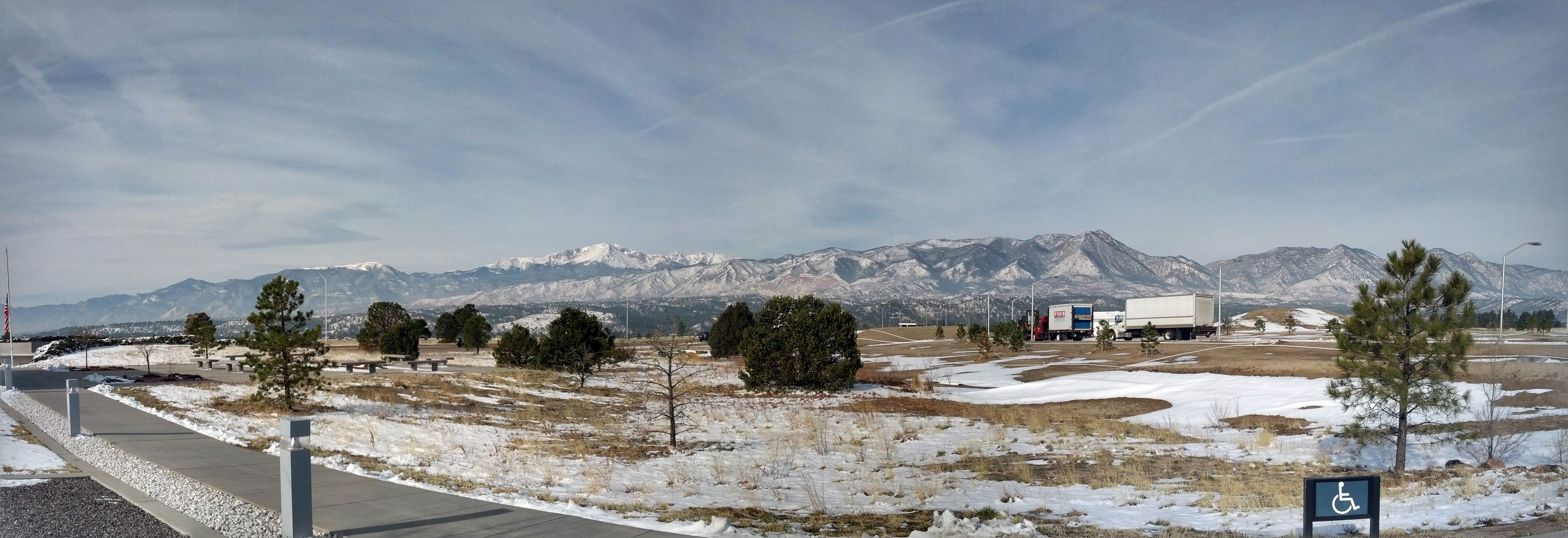
View from the south gate of the United States Air Force Academy.

== See also ==
- Colorado Springs, CO Metropolitan Statistical Area
- Rampart Range
