= Martire Family Arena =

Ice hockey arena in Fairfield, Connecticut

- Interactive map of Martire Family Arena
- Location: Fairfield, CT, 06825
- Coordinates: 41°13′03″N 73°15′13″W
- Owner: Sacred Heart University
- Operator: Sacred Heart University
- Capacity: 3,600
- Surface: 200' x 85' (hockey)

Construction
- Groundbreaking: March 15, 2021
- Opened: January, 2023
- Cost: $70 million (estimate)
- Architect: JLG Architects Project homepage

Tenants
- Sacred Heart Pioneers men's ice hockey (2023–); Sacred Heart Pioneers women's ice hockey (2023–); Sacred Heart Pioneers figure skating (2023–)

The Martire Family Arena is a 3,600-seat ice hockey arena in Fairfield, Connecticut. It is home to the Sacred Heart Pioneers men's and women's ice hockey teams. The arena opened in January 2023.

== History ==
Seeking to raise the profile of the ice hockey program, the administration at Sacred Heart University decided to build its first on-campus facility for ice hockey and figure skating. The school eventually agreed to spend $70 million to build the Martire Family Arena at their West Campus location in Fairfield, Connecticut. The project was announced in early 2021 and broke ground in March 15. By November of the same year, all of the steel beams had been set in place and construction appeared to be progressing towards the expected opening date of January 2023.

== Namesake ==
Frank and Marisa Martire donated $5 million for the arena. Frank is a graduate of Sacred Heart University in the class of 1969 and is chairman of the board of trustees. He also has an equity interest in the Vegas Golden Knights.
