= 2025–26 RIT Tigers men's ice hockey season =

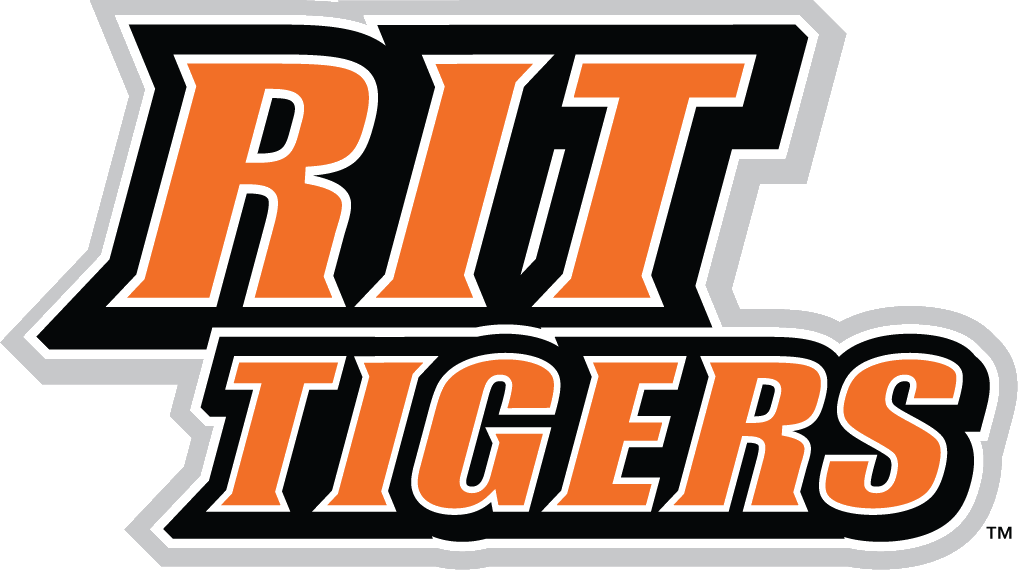
- Conference: 5th AHA
- Home ice: Gene Polisseni Center

Rankings
- USCHO: NR
- USA Hockey: NR

Record
- Overall: 17–17–2
- Conference: 13–11–2
- Home: 10–4–1
- Road: 7–11–1
- Neutral: 0–2–0

Coaches and captains
- Head coach: Matt Thomas
- Assistant coaches: David Insalaco; Shane Madolora; Josh Mitchell
- Captain: Tyler Mahan
- Alternate captain(s): Austin Brimmer; Simon Isabelle; Adam Jeffery; Kevin Scott

The 2025–26 RIT Tigers men's ice hockey season was the 62nd season of play for the program, the 21st at the Division I level and the 2nd in Atlantic Hockey America. The Tigers represented the Rochester Institute of Technology in the 2025–26 NCAA Division I men's ice hockey season, played their home games at the Gene Polisseni Center and were coached by Matt Thomas in his 1st season.

== Season ==
Matt Thomas began his tenure at RIT by having to replace a massive chunk of the team's offense. The Tigers lost the top four scorers from the previous season, who combined had accounted for exactly half of the goals scored in '25. Fortunately, the new crop of players were able to quickly acclimate to Rochester and replace the lost firepower. Four freshmen (Caleb Elfering, Evan Konyen, Will Moore, Zach Wigle) and one transfer (Austin Brimmer) made up five of the team's top six goal scorers for the year and helped the club end with a slightly higher goals per game average. The biggest development for the Tigers was the massive improvement in the play of Jakub Krbeček. After a trying freshman campaign, Krbeček settled into his role as the starting goaltender and shaved more than 1.5 off of his goals against average. Coincidentally, this upgrade in goal also came with the defense allowing more than 150 fewer shots over the course of the season.

With the offense, defense and goaltending all seeing positive movement, the Tigers got off to a fast start. After dropping the first series of the season, RIT corrected its mistakes and reeled off nine consecutive victories, their longest streak since 2010. The extended stretch had the team receiving a small amount of national attention in mid-November. However, a dip in scoring led to a 4-game skid and the team was unable to recapture their early-season magic afterwards. Over the entire second half of their schedule, RIT could find no consistency and seemed to follow up every win or two win an equal number of defeats.

By the time the postseason rolled around, RIT was stuck in neutral and had slipped down to 5th in the conference standings. While they were able to earn a bye into the Quarterfinal round, they had to travel to face Holy Cross. A quirk of scheduling led to the Tigers facing four consecutive road games against the Crusaders and the second two went only marginally better than the first. After Wigle gave the team a lead early in the third thanks to a power play marker, it was then up to Krbeček to hold the fort. With just a single goal to their credit, the Tigers nearly were able to eke out a victory. However, with less than a minute to play and Holy Cross already on a power play, the Crusaders pulled their goaltender and managed to convert on a 2-skater edge to tie the game. RIT cranked up the pressure in overtime, but Holy Cross fired a one-timer home near the middle of the fourth period to take the match. The Crusaders nearly ran away with the rematch, scoring 4 goals in the second to take a commanding lead after forty minutes. However, Moore and Brimmer combined to score three times in the third, the final with about half a minute to play, and force overtime for a second night in a row. Despite their herculean efforts, the final result was the same and Holy Cross ended RIT's season on a shot from the high slot.

== Departures ==
Player	Position	Nationality	Cause
Tanner Andrew	Forward	Canada	Graduation (signed with Norfolk Admirals)
Nick Cafarelli	Forward	United States	Graduation (signed with Reading Royals)
Ethan David	Goaltender	Canada	Left program (retired)
Tyler Fukakusa	Forward	Canada	Transferred to Northeastern
Grady Hobbs	Forward	Canada	Graduation (signed with Erding Gladiators)
Dimitri Mikrogiannakis	Defenseman	Canada	Graduation (signed with Rapaces de Gap)
Evan Miller	Forward	United States	Graduation (signed with Ratinger Ice Aliens)
Kevin Marx Norén	Forward	Sweden	Signed professional contract (Düsseldorfer EG)
Doug Scott	Defenseman	Canada	Graduation (signed with Birmingham Bulls)
Matthew Wilde	Forward	Canada	Transferred to Massachusetts

== Recruiting ==
Player	Position	Nationality	Age	Notes
Camden Bajzer	Forward	United States	21	Cleveland, OH
Austin Brimmer	Forward	Canada	23	Markham, ON; transfer from Long Island
Alex Christopoulos	Forward	Canada	22	Richmond Hill, ON; transfer from St. Francis Xavier
Caleb Elfering	Forward	United States	21	Richland, WA
Evan Konyen	Forward	Canada	21	Newmarket, ON
Collin MacKenzie	Goaltender	Canada	20	Elora, ON
Will Moore	Forward	United States	21	Westfield, IN
Brock Reinhart	Defenseman	Canada	21	Elora, ON
Ben Roger	Defenseman	Canada	22	Markham, ON; transfer from Saint Mary's; selected 49th overall 2021
Boris Skalos	Forward	United States	23	Clifton, NJ; transfer from Mercyhurst
Zach Wigle	Forward	Canada	21	Oakville, ON

== Roster ==
As of August 23, 2025.

No.	Nat.	Player	Class	Pos	Height	Weight	DoB	Hometown	Previous team	NHL rights
1	(Czech Republic)	Jakub Krbeček	Sophomore	G	6' 2" (1.88 m)	194 lb (88 kg)	2003-02-01	Prague, Czech Republic	Philadelphia Rebels (NAHL)	—
2	(Canada)	Brock Reinhart	Freshman	D	6' 3" (1.91 m)	194 lb (88 kg)	2004-07-06	Elora, Ontario	Penticton Vees (BCHL)	—
3	(United States)	Ryan Williams	Sophomore	D	6' 3" (1.91 m)	201 lb (91 kg)	2003-06-08	Pleasantville, Ohio	Janesville Jets (NAHL)	—
5	(Sweden)	Gustav Blom	Senior	F	6' 0" (1.83 m)	180 lb (82 kg)	2001-01-30	Stockholm, Sweden	New Mexico Ice Wolves (USHL)	—
6	(United States)	Boris Skalos	Junior	F	5' 11" (1.8 m)	176 lb (80 kg)	2003-01-06	Clifton, New Jersey	Mercyhurst (AHA)	—
7	(Canada)	Austin Brimmer (A)	Senior	F	6' 3" (1.91 m)	218 lb (99 kg)	2001-10-10	Markham, Ontario	Long Island (NCAA)	—
8	(Canada)	Zach Wigle	Freshman	F	6' 0" (1.83 m)	192 lb (87 kg)	2004-01-12	Oakville, Ontario	North Bay Battalion (OHL)	—
10	(Canada)	Philippe Jacques	Senior	F	6' 4" (1.93 m)	200 lb (91 kg)	2002-10-29	Quebec City, Quebec	Ottawa Jr. Senators (CCHL)	—
11	(United States)	Caleb Elfering	Freshman	F	5' 9" (1.75 m)	165 lb (75 kg)	2004-09-15	Richland, Washington	Chilliwack Chiefs (BCHL)	—
12	(Canada)	Simon Isabelle (A)	Senior	F	5' 10" (1.78 m)	170 lb (77 kg)	2001-01-12	Whitehorse, Yukon	Ottawa Jr. Senators (CCHL)	—
14	(Canada)	Tyler Mahan (C)	Senior	F	6' 0" (1.83 m)	190 lb (86 kg)	2001-12-14	Calgary, Alberta	Whitecourt Wolverines (AJHL)	—
15	(Canada)	Adam Jeffery (A)	Senior	F	6' 5" (1.96 m)	200 lb (91 kg)	2001-05-08	Leamington, Ontario	Leamington Flyers (GOJHL)	—
16	(Canada)	Ty Whyte	Sophomore	F	6' 0" (1.83 m)	174 lb (79 kg)	2003-04-02	Richmond, Ontario	Kemptville 73's (CCHL)	—
17	(Canada)	Tristan Allen	Sophomore	D	5' 11" (1.8 m)	181 lb (82 kg)	2003-08-05	Kamloops, British Columbia	Salmon Arm Silverbacks (CCHL)	—
18	(United States)	Kevin Scott (A)	Junior	D	6' 3" (1.91 m)	215 lb (98 kg)	2003-04-30	Ashburn, Virginia	Fargo Force (USHL)	—
19	(United States)	Camden Bajzer	Freshman	F	5' 10" (1.78 m)	181 lb (82 kg)	2004-03-12	Cleveland, Ohio	Cowichan Valley Capitals (BCHL)	—
20	(Canada)	Ben Roger	Junior	D	6' 4" (1.93 m)	201 lb (91 kg)	2002-11-03	Markham, Ontario	Saint Mary's (AUS)	OTT, 49th overall 2021
21	(Canada)	Mathieu Cobetto-Roy	Sophomore	F	5' 11" (1.8 m)	174 lb (79 kg)	2003-10-21	Outremont, Quebec	Trail Smoke Eaters (BCHL)	—
22	(United States)	Will Moore	Freshman	F	5' 11" (1.8 m)	185 lb (84 kg)	2004-03-22	Westfield, Indiana	Prince George Spruce Kings (BCHL)	—
23	(Canada)	Christian Catalano	Junior	F	6' 1" (1.85 m)	190 lb (86 kg)	2003-05-23	Mississauga, Ontario	Maryland Black Bears (NAHL)	—
24	(Canada)	Mason Croucher	Sophomore	D	6' 2" (1.88 m)	185 lb (84 kg)	1999-01-13	Victoria, British Columbia	Alberni Valley Bulldogs (BCHL)	—
25	(United States)	Alex Christopoulos	Sophomore	F	6' 0" (1.83 m)	194 lb (88 kg)	2003-03-26	Richmond Hill, Ontario	St. Francis Xavier (AUS)	—
26	(Canada)	Evan Konyen	Freshman	F	6' 0" (1.83 m)	181 lb (82 kg)	2004-02-22	Newmarket, Ontario	Flint Firebirds (OHL)	—
27	(Canada)	Crossley Stewart	Junior	D	6' 3" (1.91 m)	190 lb (86 kg)	2002-05-30	Prince Rupert, British Columbia	Burlington Cougars (OJHL)	—
28	(Canada)	Xavier Lapointe	Senior	D	6' 0" (1.83 m)	190 lb (86 kg)	2002-01-26	Quebec City, Quebec	Flin Flon Bombers (SJHL)	—
32	(United States)	Trent Burnham	Senior (RS)	G	6' 0" (1.83 m)	160 lb (73 kg)	2000-03-27	Eagle River, Alaska	Lindenwood (NCAA)	—
33	(Canada)	Collin Mackenzie	Freshman	G	6' 0" (1.83 m)	174 lb (79 kg)	2004-11-30	Elora, Ontario	Ottawa 67's (OHL)	—

== Standings ==
2025–26 Atlantic Hockey America Standings
	Conference record										Overall record					
	GP	W	L	T	OW	OL	SW	PTS	GF	GA	GP	W	L	T	GF	GA
#20 Bentley †*	26	16	6	4	1	0	2	53	85	56	40	23	12	5	122	94
Sacred Heart	26	15	8	3	1	0	1	48	80	61	40	23	14	3	118	96
Robert Morris	26	13	11	2	0	2	2	45	69	69	40	16	21	3	103	128
Holy Cross	26	14	10	2	1	1	1	45	81	69	38	18	18	2	113	116
RIT	26	13	11	2	2	1	2	42	69	68	36	17	17	2	93	96
Air Force	26	13	10	3	2	1	0	41	75	73	37	18	15	4	108	112
Canisius	26	12	12	2	1	0	2	39	81	74	35	17	16	2	107	105
Niagara	26	9	16	1	1	3	0	30	67	83	37	13	23	1	93	118
Army	26	7	15	4	2	3	2	28	61	75	35	12	17	6	91	96
Mercyhurst	26	5	18	3	0	0	1	19	47	87	37	6	28	3	65	143
Championship: March 21, 2026 † indicates conference regular season champion (DeGregorio Trophy) * indicates conference tournament champion (Riley Trophy); Rankings: USCHO.com Top 20 Poll; updated April 15, 2026; Source: AHA

== Schedule and results ==
Date	Time	Opponent^{#}	Rank^{#}	Site	TV	Decision	Result	Attendance	Record
Exhibition
October 4	5:05 pm	Western Ontario*		Gene Polisseni Center • Henrietta, New York (Exhibition)	FloHockey	Krbeček	W 6–1	1,198	
Regular Season
October 10	7:05 pm	Sacred Heart		Gene Polisseni Center • Henrietta, New York	FloHockey	Krbeček	L 0–1	2,271	0–1–0 (0–1–0)
October 11	5:05 pm	Sacred Heart		Gene Polisseni Center • Henrietta, New York	FloHockey	Mackenzie	L 1–6	1,937	0–2–0 (0–2–0)
October 18	7:05 pm	Clarkson*		Blue Cross Arena • Rochester, New York	FloHockey	Krbeček	W 6–2	10,556	1–2–0
October 24	7:05 pm	Air Force		Gene Polisseni Center • Henrietta, New York	FloHockey	Krbeček	W 5–1	2,443	2–2–0 (1–2–0)
October 25	5:05 pm	Air Force		Gene Polisseni Center • Henrietta, New York	FloHockey	Krbeček	W 7–3	2,373	3–2–0 (2–2–0)
October 31	7:05 pm	at Colgate*		Class of 1965 Arena • Hamilton, New York	ESPN+	Krbeček	W 3–1	1,669	4–2–0
November 1	7:05 pm	at Colgate*		Class of 1965 Arena • Hamilton, New York	ESPN+	Krbeček	W 4–1	1,502	5–2–0
November 7	7:05 pm	Mercyhurst		Gene Polisseni Center • Henrietta, New York	FloHockey	Krbeček	W 4–1	2,977	6–2–0 (3–2–0)
November 8	5:05 pm	Mercyhurst		Gene Polisseni Center • Henrietta, New York	FloHockey	Krbeček	W 3–2	3,407	7–2–0 (4–2–0)
November 14	7:05 pm	at Robert Morris		Clearview Arena • Neville Township, Pennsylvania	FloHockey	Krbeček	W 2–1	512	8–2–0 (5–2–0)
November 15	7:05 pm	at Robert Morris		Clearview Arena • Neville Township, Pennsylvania	FloHockey	Krbeček	W 3–2	512	9–2–0 (6–2–0)
November 18	7:05 pm	at Niagara		Dwyer Arena • Lewiston, New York	FloHockey	Krbeček	L 1–2 ^{OT}	870	9–3–0 (6–3–0)
November 21	7:05 pm	at Bentley		Bentley Arena • Waltham, Massachusetts	FloHockey	Krbeček	L 2–3	1,675	9–4–0 (6–4–0)
Friendship Four
November 28	2:00 pm	vs. Miami*		SSE Arena Belfast • Belfast, Northern Ireland (Friendship Four Semifinal)		Krbeček	L 0–4	3,601	9–5–0
November 29	10:00 am	vs. Sacred Heart*		SSE Arena Belfast • Belfast, Northern Ireland (Friendship Four Consolation Game)		Burnham	L 0–3	4,101	9–6–0
December 5	7:05 pm	Canisius		Gene Polisseni Center • Henrietta, New York	FloHockey	Krbeček	W 3–1	2,967	10–6–0 (7–4–0)
December 6	7:05 pm	at Canisius		LECOM Harborcenter • Buffalo, New York	FloHockey	Krbeček	L 2–4	1,267	10–7–0 (7–5–0)
December 29	7:05 pm	at Clarkson*		Cheel Arena • Potsdam, New York	ESPN+	Krbeček	L 2–3	2,246	10–8–0
January 2	7:05 pm	at #8 Penn State*		Gene Polisseni Center • Henrietta, New York	FloHockey	Krbeček	W 1–0	4,233	11–8–0
January 4	7:05 pm	#8 Penn State*		Pegula Ice Arena • University Park, Pennsylvania	BTN+	Krbeček	L 3–7	6,269	11–9–0
January 9	7:05 pm	Robert Morris		Gene Polisseni Center • Henrietta, New York	FloHockey, SNP	Krbeček	W 4–1	2,208	12–9–0 (8–5–0)
January 10	7:05 pm	Robert Morris		Gene Polisseni Center • Henrietta, New York	FloHockey, SNP	Krbeček	W 3–2 ^{OT}	2,833	13–9–0 (9–5–0)
January 16	7:05 pm	at Canisius		LECOM Harborcenter • Buffalo, New York	FloHockey	Krbeček	L 3–5	1,192	13–10–0 (9–6–0)
January 17	7:05 pm	Canisius		Gene Polisseni Center • Henrietta, New York	FloHockey	Krbeček	L 1–4	4,111	13–11–0 (9–7–0)
January 23	7:05 pm	at Niagara		Dwyer Arena • Lewiston, New York	FloHockey	Krbeček	W 4–2	598	14–11–0 (10–7–0)
January 24	7:05 pm	Niagara		Gene Polisseni Center • Henrietta, New York	FloHockey	Krbeček	T 3–3 ^{SOW}	3,533	14–11–1 (10–7–1)
January 30	7:05 pm	at Mercyhurst		Mercyhurst Ice Center • Erie, Pennsylvania	FloHockey	Krbeček	T 2–2 ^{SOW}	985	14–11–2 (10–7–2)
January 31	7:05 pm	at Mercyhurst		Mercyhurst Ice Center • Erie, Pennsylvania	FloHockey	Krbeček	W 3–1	943	15–11–2 (11–7–2)
February 6	7:05 pm	at Army		Tate Rink • West Point, New York	FloHockey	Krbeček	L 2–6	1,834	15–12–2 (11–8–2)
February 7	7:05 pm	at Army		Tate Rink • West Point, New York	FloHockey	Krbeček	W 3–2 ^{OT}	2,508	16–12–2 (12–8–2)
February 10	7:05 pm	Niagara		Gene Polisseni Center • Henrietta, New York	FloHockey	Krbeček	W 2–1	2,057	17–12–2 (13–8–2)
February 20	7:05 pm	Bentley		Gene Polisseni Center • Henrietta, New York	FloHockey	Krbeček	L 3–4	4,233	17–13–2 (13–9–2)
February 27	7:05 pm	at Holy Cross		Hart Center • Worcester, Massachusetts	FloHockey	Krbeček	L 1–5	751	17–14–2 (13–10–2)
February 28	7:05 pm	at Holy Cross		Hart Center • Worcester, Massachusetts	FloHockey	Krbeček	L 2–3	1,021	17–15–2 (13–11–2)
Atlantic Hockey America Tournament
March 6	7:00 pm	at Holy Cross*		Hart Center • Worcester, Massachusetts (AHA Quarterfinal Game 1)	FloHockey	Krbeček	L 1–2 ^{OT}	988	17–16–2
March 7	7:00 pm	at Holy Cross*		Hart Center • Worcester, Massachusetts (AHA Quarterfinal Game 2)	FloHockey	Krbeček	L 4–5 ^{OT}	1,092	17–17–2
*Non-conference game. ^{#}Rankings from USCHO.com Poll. All times are in Eastern Time. Source:

== Scoring statistics ==
Name	Position	Games	Goals	Assists	Points	PIM
Austin Brimmer	RW	36	10	15	25	16
Zach Wigle	C/LW	36	8	17	25	4
Evan Konyen	RW	35	12	12	24	33
Christian Catalano	RW	36	10	12	22	56
Will Moore	C	36	11	6	17	16
Caleb Elfering	RW	36	8	7	15	10
Simon Isabelle	RW	33	5	10	15	24
Tristan Allen	D	35	1	14	15	32
Ben Roger	D	35	3	11	14	12
Crossley Stewart	D	34	1	11	12	10
Tyler Mahan	LW	26	7	2	9	0
Philippe Jacques	C	33	4	4	8	14
Xavier Lapointe	D	17	2	6	8	12
Mason Croucher	D	31	2	5	7	18
Boris Skalos	F	23	2	4	6	4
Mathieu Cobetto-Roy	F	19	1	4	5	8
Ty Whyte	C	26	3	1	4	10
Camden Bajzer	F	28	2	2	4	8
Ryan Williams	D	28	1	3	4	12
Kevin Scott	D	34	0	4	4	35
Adam Jeffery	LW	27	0	3	3	0
Brock Reinhart	D	23	0	2	2	4
Gustav Blom	D	13	0	1	1	2
Trent Burnham	G	2	0	0	0	0
Collin MacKenzie	G	3	0	0	0	0
Alex Christopoulos	RW	5	0	0	0	0
Jakub Krbeček	G	33	0	0	0	4
Bench	–	–	–	–	–	4
Total			93	156	249	348

== Goaltending statistics ==
Name	Games	Minutes	Wins	Losses	Ties	Goals Against	Saves	Shut Outs	SV %	GAA
Trent Burnham	2	72:38	0	1	0	1	21	0	.955	0.83
Jakub Krbeček	33	1942:24	17	15	1	75	818	1	.916	2.32
Collin MacKenzie	3	153:46	0	1	0	10	44	0	.815	3.90
Empty Net	-	21:16	-	-	-	10	-	-	-	-
Total	36	2190:04	17	17	2	96	883	1	.902	2.63

== Rankings ==
Ranking movements Legend: ██ Increase in ranking ██ Decrease in ranking — = Not ranked RV = Received votes
	Week																											
Poll	Pre	1	2	3	4	5	6	7	8	9	10	11	12	13	14	15	16	17	18	19	20	21	22	23	24	25	26	Final
USCHO.com	—	—	—	—	—	—	RV	RV	RV	RV	RV	RV	*	—	RV	RV	RV	RV	RV	—	—	—	—	—	—	—	—	—
USA Hockey	—	—	—	—	—	—	—	RV	—	—	RV	RV	*	—	RV	RV	RV	RV	RV	—	—	—	—	—	—	—	—	—

Note: USCHO did not release a week 12 poll
Note: USA Hockey did not release a week 12 poll
