= 2025–26 Canisius Golden Griffins men's ice hockey season =

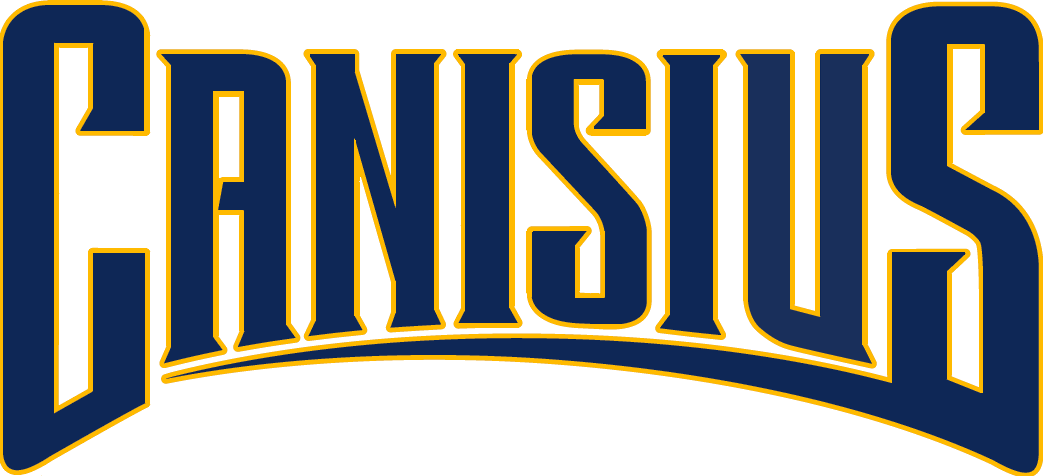
- Conference: 7th AHA
- Home ice: LECOM Harborcenter

Rankings
- USCHO: NR
- USA Hockey: NR

Record
- Overall: 17–16–2
- Conference: 12–12–2
- Home: 10–6–2
- Road: 7–10–0

Coaches and captains
- Head coach: Trevor Large
- Assistant coaches: Max Mobley; Matt Hoover
- Captain: Oliver Tarr
- Alternate captain(s): Trey Funk; Alton McDermott

The 2025–26 Canisius Golden Griffins men's ice hockey season was the 46th season of play for the program, the 28th at the Division I level, and the 2nd in Atlantic Hockey America. The Golden Griffins represented Canisius College in the 2025–26 NCAA Division I men's ice hockey season, played their home games at the LECOM Harborcenter and were coached by Trevor Large in his 9th season.

== Season ==
Canisius kicked off their season with a bang, winning five of their first six matches. Chase Clark was living up to his pedigree as an NHL draft pick while the offense saw a sizable boost from the improved play of Grant Porter and the addition of Walter Zacher. However, after the hot start the team immediately slid into a skid and lost seven of their next eleven games. Clark's poor play necessitated a change in goal, allowing Petter Wickström Stumer to play a large number of games in the second half.

At first, the switch seemed to work. Canisius went 6–2 in January with both of their goaltenders playing well. The offense, too, improved after the holiday break; Killian Kiecker-Olson, in his final season of college play, finally found his scoring touch after Thanksgiving and posted numbers that dwarfed his career totals. Some shaky goaltending crept in at the beginning of February and caused the Griffins to slip a bit in the standings. The team was only able to finish with an even record in conference play and they just missed getting a bye into the quarterfinal round.

The postseason began with Canisius hosting Mercyhurst, the worst-ranked team in all of college hockey. The Golden Griffins dominated play in their final home game of the season, outshooting the Lakers 49–13. However, the team was stymied by a superlative performance by the Mercyhurst netminder. Despite getting six power plays in the game, including a brief 5-on-3, Canisius could only convert on one of their man-advantages and they were unable to overcome a lackluster outing from Clark. Down by 1 late in the third, the Griffins were forced to pull their goaltender but all that did was allow Mercyhurst to score a pair of empty-net goals and put an end to Canisius' season.

== Departures ==
| Player | Position | Nationality | Cause |
|---|---|---|---|
| Ben Bonisteel | Goaltender | Canada | Transferred to Brock |
| Jack Budd | Defenseman | United States | Transferred to Toronto Metropolitan |
| Alec Cicero | Forward | United States | Graduation (signed with Worcester Railers) |
| Michael Colella | Forward | United States | Graduation (signed with Peoria Rivermen) |
| Jackson Decker | Defenseman | United States | Graduation (signed with Allen Americans) |
| Luke Farthing | Defenseman | United States | Graduation (signed with Birmingham Bulls) |
| Matteo Giampa | Forward | Canada | Transferred to Miami |
| Cooper Haar | Forward | United States | Graduation (retired) |
| Kyle Haskins | Forward | United States | Graduation (signed with Orlando Solar Bears) |
| Cole Kodsi | Forward | United States | Graduation (signed with Orlando Solar Bears) |
| Keegan Langefels | Defenseman | United States | Graduation (retired) |
| Jackson Nieuwendyk | Forward | United States | Left program (retired) |
| Dominic Payne | Defenseman | Canada | Transferred to Massachusetts Lowell |
| Cody Schiavon | Defenseman | Canada | Graduation (igned with Orlando Solar Bears) |
| Matthew Vermaeten | Forward | Canada | Graduation (signed with Diables Rouges de Valenciennes) |

== Recruiting ==
| Player | Position | Nationality | Age | Notes |
|---|---|---|---|---|
| Carter Anderson | Forward | Canada | 21 | Thompson, MB |
| J. F. Buteau | Defenseman | Canada | 21 | Montréal, QC |
| Rhys Chiddenton | Forward | Canada | 22 | Campbellville, ON; transfer from Bemidji State |
| Chase Clark | Goaltender | United States | 23 | Williamsville, NY; transfer from American International; selected 183rd overall in 2021 |
| Brice Cooke | Forward | Canada | 21 | Orangeville, ON |
| David Elmy | Forward | Canada | 20 | Mississauga, ON |
| Jason Gallucci | Defenseman | United States | 21 | Robbinsville, NJ; transfer from Penn State |
| Kyan Haldenby | Forward | Canada | 21 | Toronto, ON |
| Joseph Messina | Defenseman | Canada | 23 | Woodbridge, ON; transfer from Union |
| Cole Miller | Forward | Canada | 20 | Edmonton, AB |
| Jack Pascucci | Defenseman | United States | 23 | North Andover, MA; transfer from Connecticut |
| Josh Phillips | Defenseman | United States | 24 | Getzville, NY; graduate transfer from Union |
| Nick Strom | Defenseman | United States | 25 | Dayton, MN; graduate transfer from Rensselaer |
| Walter Zacher | Forward | United States | 23 | Buffalo, NY; transfer from Robert Morris |

== Roster ==
As of August 7, 2024.

| No. | Nat. | Player | Class | Pos | Height | Weight | DoB | Hometown | Previous team | NHL rights |
|---|---|---|---|---|---|---|---|---|---|---|
| 4 | (Canada) | Brice Cooke | Freshman | F | 6' 3" (1.91 m) | 190 lb (86 kg) | 2004-03-23 | Orangeville, Ontario | Toronto Patriots (OJHL) | — |
| 5 | (Canada) | Robert Kincaid | Senior | D | 6' 2" (1.88 m) | 185 lb (84 kg) | 2002-05-13 | Barrhead, Alberta | Maine (HEA) | — |
| 8 | (Canada) | Rhys Chiddenton | Junior | F | 6' 0" (1.83 m) | 182 lb (83 kg) | 2003-05-23 | Campbellville, Ontario | Bemidji State (CCHA) | — |
| 9 | (United States) | Walter Zacher | Junior | F | 5' 11" (1.8 m) | 181 lb (82 kg) | 2002-04-02 | Buffalo, New York | Robert Morris (AHA) | — |
| 12 | (Canada) | Kash Rasmussen | Senior | F | 6' 2" (1.88 m) | 170 lb (77 kg) | 2001-04-20 | Cochrane, Alberta | Michigan Tech (CCHA) | — |
| 13 | (United States) | Jason Gallucci | Sophomore | D | 5' 10" (1.78 m) | 172 lb (78 kg) | 2004-04-22 | Robbinsville, New Jersey | Penn State (Big Ten) | — |
| 14 | (Canada) | Trey Funk (A) | Junior | F | 6' 2" (1.88 m) | 180 lb (82 kg) | 2002-04-11 | Redwood Meadows, Alberta | Bonnyville Pontiacs (AJHL) | — |
| 15 | (Canada) | Cole Miller | Freshman | F | 6' 4" (1.93 m) | 190 lb (86 kg) | 2005-02-04 | Edmonton, Alberta | Edmonton Oil Kings (WHL) | — |
| 20 | (Canada) | Ryan Gillespie | Sophomore | F | 6' 0" (1.83 m) | 190 lb (86 kg) | 2003-01-31 | Toronto, Ontario | Salmon Arm Silverbacks (BCHL) | — |
| 23 | (Canada) | Joseph Messina | Junior | D | 5' 9" (1.75 m) | 185 lb (84 kg) | 2002-02-01 | Woodbridge, Ontario | Union (ECAC) | — |
| 24 | (United States) | Josh Phillips | Graduate | D | 6' 2" (1.88 m) | 190 lb (86 kg) | 2001-05-24 | Getzville, New York | Union (ECAC) | — |
| 25 | (United States) | Nick Strom | Graduate | D | 6' 0" (1.83 m) | 190 lb (86 kg) | 2000-03-21 | Dayton, Minnesota | Rensselaer (ECAC) | — |
| 26 | (Switzerland) | Stefano Bottini | Senior | F | 6' 0" (1.83 m) | 180 lb (82 kg) | 2002-05-03 | Lugano, Switzerland | Penticton Vees (BCHL) | — |
| 27 | (Canada) | Carter Anderson | Freshman | F | 5' 11" (1.8 m) | 183 lb (83 kg) | 2004-08-01 | Thompson, Manitoba | Chilliwack Chiefs (BCHL) | — |
| 30 | (Canada) | Ethan Robertson | Junior | G | 6' 1" (1.85 m) | 175 lb (79 kg) | 2002-02-22 | Courtice, Ontario | Austin Bruins (NAHL) | — |
| 33 | (Sweden) | Petter Wickström Stumer | Sophomore | G | 6' 6" (1.98 m) | 203 lb (92 kg) | 2004-09-03 | Stockholm, Sweden | Northeast Generals (NAHL) | — |
| 37 | (Canada) | Hunter Andrew | Senior | F | 6' 0" (1.83 m) | 165 lb (75 kg) | 2002-10-25 | Virden, Manitoba | Powell River Kings (BCHL) | — |
| 41 | (United States) | Chase Clark | Senior | G | 6' 6" (1.98 m) | 208 lb (94 kg) | 2002-04-08 | Williamsville, New York | American International (AHA) | WSH, 183rd overall 2021 |
| 42 | (United States) | Nick Strom | Senior | D | 6' 0" (1.83 m) | 190 lb (86 kg) | 2000-03-21 | Dayton, Minnesota | Rensselaer (ECAC) | — |
| 44 | (Canada) | Luke Marshall | Sophomore | D | 6' 0" (1.83 m) | 170 lb (77 kg) | 2003-06-20 | Fenwick, Ontario | Brooks Bandits (BCHL) | — |
| 47 | (United States) | Grant Porter | Senior | F | 5' 11" (1.8 m) | 180 lb (82 kg) | 2002-02-21 | Weston, Massachusetts | Providence (HEA) | — |
| 55 | (Canada) | Christian MacDougall | Senior | F | 6' 0" (1.83 m) | 180 lb (82 kg) | 2001-03-13 | Toronto, Ontario | Coquitlam Express (BCHL) | — |
| 57 | (Canada) | Carter Patterson | Sophomore | D | 6' 4" (1.93 m) | 201 lb (91 kg) | 2003-11-13 | Burlington, Ontario | Blackfalds Bulldogs (BCHL) | — |
| 61 | (Canada) | Hunter Price | Sophomore | F | 6' 1" (1.85 m) | 194 lb (88 kg) | 2003-10-25 | Calgary, Alberta | Sherwood Park Crusaders (BCHL) | — |
| 72 | (Canada) | Kyan Haldenby | Freshman | F | 6' 2" (1.88 m) | 190 lb (86 kg) | 2005-04-13 | Toronto, Ontario | Shreveport Mudbugs (NAHL) | — |
| 73 | (Canada) | F. J. Buteau | Freshman | D | 6' 4" (1.93 m) | 207 lb (94 kg) | 2000-07-01 | Montréal, Quebec | Acadie-Bathurst Titan (QMJHL) | — |
| 77 | (United States) | Jack Pascucci | Senior | D | 6' 2" (1.88 m) | 195 lb (88 kg) | 2002-02-15 | North Andover, Massachusetts | Connecticut (HEA) | — |
| 88 | (United States) | Killian Kiecker-Olson | Senior | F | 6' 1" (1.85 m) | 195 lb (88 kg) | 2001-01-19 | Andover, Minnesota | Maine (HEA) | — |
| 91 | (Canada) | Alton McDermott (A) | Graduate | F | 5' 10" (1.78 m) | 175 lb (79 kg) | 2001-06-04 | Oakville, Ontario | Oakville Blades (OJHL) | — |
| 92 | (Canada) | Oliver Tarr (C) | Senior | F | 6' 0" (1.83 m) | 185 lb (84 kg) | 2002-01-20 | Uxbridge, Ontario | Haliburton County Huskies (OJHL) | — |
| 94 | (Canada) | David Elmy | Freshman | F | 6' 1" (1.85 m) | 198 lb (90 kg) | 2005-01-29 | Mississauga, Ontario | St. Michael's Buzzers (OJHL) | — |

== Standings ==
2025–26 Atlantic Hockey America Standings
| | Conference record | | | | | | | | | | Overall record | | | | | |
| | GP | W | L | T | OW | OL | SW | PTS | GF | GA | GP | W | L | T | GF | GA |
|---|---|---|---|---|---|---|---|---|---|---|---|---|---|---|---|---|
| #20 Bentley †* | 26 | 16 | 6 | 4 | 1 | 0 | 2 | 53 | 85 | 56 | 40 | 23 | 12 | 5 | 122 | 94 |
| Sacred Heart | 26 | 15 | 8 | 3 | 1 | 0 | 1 | 48 | 80 | 61 | 40 | 23 | 14 | 3 | 118 | 96 |
| Robert Morris | 26 | 13 | 11 | 2 | 0 | 2 | 2 | 45 | 69 | 69 | 40 | 16 | 21 | 3 | 103 | 128 |
| Holy Cross | 26 | 14 | 10 | 2 | 1 | 1 | 1 | 45 | 81 | 69 | 38 | 18 | 18 | 2 | 113 | 116 |
| RIT | 26 | 13 | 11 | 2 | 2 | 1 | 2 | 42 | 69 | 68 | 36 | 17 | 17 | 2 | 93 | 96 |
| Air Force | 26 | 13 | 10 | 3 | 2 | 1 | 0 | 41 | 75 | 73 | 37 | 18 | 15 | 4 | 108 | 112 |
| Canisius | 26 | 12 | 12 | 2 | 1 | 0 | 2 | 39 | 81 | 74 | 35 | 17 | 16 | 2 | 107 | 105 |
| Niagara | 26 | 9 | 16 | 1 | 1 | 3 | 0 | 30 | 67 | 83 | 37 | 13 | 23 | 1 | 93 | 118 |
| Army | 26 | 7 | 15 | 4 | 2 | 3 | 2 | 28 | 61 | 75 | 35 | 12 | 17 | 6 | 91 | 96 |
| Mercyhurst | 26 | 5 | 18 | 3 | 0 | 0 | 1 | 19 | 47 | 87 | 37 | 6 | 28 | 3 | 65 | 143 |
Championship: March 21, 2026 † indicates conference regular season champion (DeGregorio Trophy) * indicates conference tournament champion (Riley Trophy); Rankings: USCHO.com Top 20 Poll; updated April 15, 2026; Source: AHA

== Schedule and results ==
| Date | Time | Opponent^{#} | Rank^{#} | Site | TV | Decision | Result | Attendance | Record |
Regular Season
| October 3 | 7:00 pm | Clarkson* | | LECOM Harborcenter • Buffalo, New York | FloHockey | Clark | W 3–1 | 1,060 | 1–0–0 |
| October 5 | 5:00 pm | St. Lawrence* | | LECOM Harborcenter • Buffalo, New York | FloHockey | Clark | W 4–2 | 89 | 2–0–0 |
| October 10 | 7:00 pm | Long Island* | | LECOM Harborcenter • Buffalo, New York | FloHockey | Clark | W 3–2 ^{OT} | 670 | 3–0–0 |
| October 11 | 7:00 pm | Long Island* | | LECOM Harborcenter • Buffalo, New York | FloHockey | Robertson | L 1–6 | 467 | 3–1–0 |
| October 14 | 7:00 pm | at Army | | Tate Rink • West Point, New York | FloHockey | Clark | W 3–1 | 1,038 | 4–1–0 (1–0–0) |
| October 17 | 7:00 pm | at Colgate* | | Class of 1965 Arena • Hamilton, New York | ESPN+ | Clark | W 4–2 | 901 | 5–1–0 |
| October 18 | 7:00 pm | at Colgate* | | Class of 1965 Arena • Hamilton, New York | ESPN+ | Clark | L 3–5 | 714 | 5–2–0 |
| October 24 | 7:00 pm | at Bentley | | Bentley Arena • Waltham, Massachusetts | FloHockey | Clark | L 1–4 | 1,800 | 5–3–0 (1–1–0) |
| October 25 | 6:00 pm | at Bentley | | Bentley Arena • Waltham, Massachusetts | FloHockey | Clark | L 0–3 | 1,305 | 5–4–0 (1–2–0) |
| November 1 | 7:00 pm | Army | | LECOM Harborcenter • Buffalo, New York | FloHockey | Clark | T 2–2 ^{SOW} | 877 | 5–4–1 (1–2–1) |
| November 14 | 7:00 pm | at Sacred Heart | | Martire Family Arena • Fairfield, Connecticut | FloHockey | Clark | L 1–6 | 2,513 | 5–5–1 (1–3–1) |
| November 15 | 5:00 pm | at Sacred Heart | | Martire Family Arena • Fairfield, Connecticut | FloHockey | Clark | L 2–3 | 2,736 | 5–6–1 (1–4–1) |
| November 21 | 7:00 pm | Mercyhurst | | LECOM Harborcenter • Buffalo, New York | FloHockey | Clark | W 4–3 | 675 | 6–6–1 (2–4–1) |
| November 22 | 7:00 pm | Mercyhurst | | LECOM Harborcenter • Buffalo, New York | FloHockey | Clark | W 5–1 | 967 | 7–6–1 (3–4–1) |
| November 28 | 1:00 pm | Air Force | | LECOM Harborcenter • Buffalo, New York | FloHockey | Clark | L 3–6 | 667 | 7–7–1 (3–5–1) |
| November 29 | 1:00 pm | Air Force | | LECOM Harborcenter • Buffalo, New York | FloHockey | Clark | T 3–3 ^{SOW} | 653 | 7–7–2 (3–5–2) |
| December 5 | 7:00 pm | at RIT | | Gene Polisseni Center • Henrietta, New York | FloHockey | Clark | L 1–3 | 2,967 | 7–8–2 (3–6–2) |
| December 6 | 7:05 pm | RIT | | LECOM Harborcenter • Buffalo, New York | FloHockey | Wickström Stumer | W 4–2 | 1,267 | 8–8–2 (4–6–2) |
| January 2 | 8:30 pm | at Lindenwood* | | Centene Community Ice Center • St. Charles, Missouri | | Clark | L 2–5 | 904 | 8–9–2 |
| January 3 | 4:30 pm | at Lindenwood* | | Centene Community Ice Center • St. Charles, Missouri | | Wickström Stumer | W 4–3 | 887 | 9–9–2 |
| January 16 | 7:00 pm | RIT | | LECOM Harborcenter • Buffalo, New York | FloHockey | Wickström Stumer | W 5–3 | 1,192 | 10–9–2 (5–6–2) |
| January 17 | 7:00 pm | at RIT | | Gene Polisseni Center • Henrietta, New York | FloHockey | Clark | W 4–1 | 4,111 | 11–9–2 (6–6–2) |
| January 23 | 7:00 pm | at Mercyhurst | | Mercyhurst Ice Center • Erie, Pennsylvania | FloHockey | Clark | W 4–3 | 908 | 12–9–2 (7–6–2) |
| January 24 | 5:00 pm | at Mercyhurst | | Mercyhurst Ice Center • Erie, Pennsylvania | FloHockey | Clark | W 5–0 | 902 | 13–9–2 (8–6–2) |
| January 30 | 7:00 pm | Niagara | | LECOM Harborcenter • Buffalo, New York (Rivalry) | FloHockey | Wickström Stumer | L 3–5 | 1,367 | 13–10–2 (8–7–2) |
| January 31 | 7:00 pm | at Niagara | | Dwyer Arena • Lewiston, New York (Rivalry) | FloHockey | Wickström Stumer | W 4–3 ^{OT} | 1,186 | 14–10–2 (9–7–2) |
| February 6 | 7:00 pm | at Robert Morris | | Clearview Arena • Neville Township, Pennsylvania | FloHockey | Wickström Stumer | L 0–1 | 724 | 14–11–2 (9–8–2) |
| February 7 | 7:00 pm | at Robert Morris | | Clearview Arena • Neville Township, Pennsylvania | FloHockey | Wickström Stumer | L 4–6 | 892 | 14–12–2 (9–9–2) |
| February 13 | 7:00 pm | Holy Cross | | LECOM Harborcenter • Buffalo, New York | FloHockey | Wickström Stumer | L 3–4 | 767 | 14–13–2 (9–10–2) |
| February 14 | 4:00 pm | Holy Cross | | LECOM Harborcenter • Buffalo, New York | FloHockey | Wickström Stumer | W 5–3 | 891 | 15–13–2 (10–10–2) |
| February 20 | 7:00 pm | Robert Morris | | LECOM Harborcenter • Buffalo, New York | FloHockey | Clark | L 1–4 | 796 | 15–14–2 (10–11–2) |
| February 21 | 4:00 pm | Robert Morris | | LECOM Harborcenter • Buffalo, New York | FloHockey | Wickström Stumer | W 7–0 | 723 | 16–14–2 (11–11–2) |
| February 27 | 6:00 pm | at Niagara | | Dwyer Arena • Lewiston, New York (Rivalry) | FloHockey | Wickström Stumer | L 2–3 | 1,187 | 16–15–2 (11–12–2) |
| February 28 | 6:00 pm | Niagara | | LECOM Harborcenter • Buffalo, New York (Rivalry) | FloHockey | Clark | W 5–1 | 903 | 17–15–2 (12–12–2) |
Atlantic Hockey America Tournament
| March 3 | 6:00 pm | Mercyhurst* | | LECOM Harborcenter • Buffalo, New York (AHA First Round) | FloHockey | Clark | L 2–5 | 452 | 17–16–2 |
*Non-conference game. ^{#}Rankings from USCHO.com Poll. All times are in Eastern Time. Source:

== Scoring statistics ==
| Name | Position | Games | Goals | Assists | Points | PIM |
|---|---|---|---|---|---|---|
| Grant Porter | F | 35 | 12 | 23 | 35 | 12 |
| Walter Zacher | C | 32 | 19 | 12 | 31 | 20 |
| Killian Kiecker-Olson | C | 35 | 8 | 18 | 26 | 26 |
| Rhys Chiddenton | LW | 35 | 11 | 11 | 22 | 12 |
| Oliver Tarr | RW | 35 | 8 | 12 | 20 | 6 |
| J. F. Buteau | D | 31 | 5 | 12 | 17 | 20 |
| Robert Kincaid | D | 33 | 4 | 11 | 15 | 6 |
| Alton McDermott | RW | 17 | 8 | 6 | 14 | 0 |
| Hunter Price | F | 27 | 8 | 6 | 14 | 2 |
| Carter Anderson | F | 25 | 5 | 8 | 13 | 6 |
| Hunter Andrew | F | 30 | 4 | 8 | 12 | 10 |
| Jason Gallucci | D | 35 | 1 | 9 | 10 | 38 |
| Carter Patterson | D | 35 | 2 | 7 | 9 | 28 |
| Stefano Bottini | LW/RW | 32 | 4 | 4 | 8 | 10 |
| Kash Rasmussen | F | 33 | 2 | 5 | 7 | 10 |
| Kyan Haldenby | C | 18 | 2 | 4 | 6 | 17 |
| Jack Pascucci | D | 35 | 0 | 6 | 6 | 40 |
| Cole Miller | F | 26 | 2 | 2 | 4 | 2 |
| Trey Funk | F | 34 | 2 | 2 | 4 | 18 |
| Luke Marshall | D | 26 | 0 | 4 | 4 | 4 |
| Brice Cooke | LW | 11 | 0 | 2 | 2 | 4 |
| Ryan Gillespie | RW | 4 | 0 | 1 | 1 | 0 |
| Christian MacDougall | F | 9 | 0 | 1 | 1 | 10 |
| Joseph Messina | D | 12 | 0 | 1 | 1 | 2 |
| Chase Clark | G | 24 | 0 | 1 | 1 | 15 |
| Ethan Robertson | G | 2 | 0 | 0 | 0 | 0 |
| David Elmy | C | 5 | 0 | 0 | 0 | 2 |
| Nick Strom | D | 8 | 0 | 0 | 0 | 0 |
| Josh Phillips | D | 8 | 0 | 0 | 0 | 4 |
| Petter Wickström Stumer | G | 12 | 0 | 0 | 0 | 0 |
| Bench | – | – | – | – | – | 8 |
| Total | | | 107 | 176 | 283 | 332 |

== Goaltending statistics ==
| Name | Games | Minutes | Wins | Losses | Ties | Goals Against | Saves | Shut Outs | SV % | GAA |
|---|---|---|---|---|---|---|---|---|---|---|
| Petter Wickström Stumer | 12 | 659:26 | 6 | 5 | 0 | 29 | 336 | 1 | .921 | 2.64 |
| Chase Clark | 24 | 1263:02 | 11 | 10 | 2 | 62 | 578 | 1 | .903 | 2.73 |
| Ethan Robertson | 4 | 62:57 | 0 | 1 | 0 | 6 | 28 | 0 | .824 | 5.72 |
| Empty Net | - | 31:22 | - | - | - | 8 | - | - | - | - |
| Total | 35 | 2116:47 | 17 | 16 | 2 | 105 | 942 | 2 | .900 | 2.98 |

== Rankings ==
| Poll | Week | | | | | | | | | | | | | | | | | | | | | | | | | | | |
| Poll | Pre | 1 | 2 | 3 | 4 | 5 | 6 | 7 | 8 | 9 | 10 | 11 | 12 | 13 | 14 | 15 | 16 | 17 | 18 | 19 | 20 | 21 | 22 | 23 | 24 | 25 | 26 | 27 (Final) |
|---|---|---|---|---|---|---|---|---|---|---|---|---|---|---|---|---|---|---|---|---|---|---|---|---|---|---|---|---|
| USCHO.com | NR | RV | RV | RV | NR | NR | NR | NR | NR | NR | NR | NR | – | NR | NR | NR | NR | NR | NR | NR | NR | NR | NR | NR | NR | NR | NR | NR |
| USA Hockey | NR | NR | NR | RV | NR | NR | NR | NR | NR | NR | NR | NR | – | NR | NR | NR | NR | NR | NR | NR | NR | NR | NR | NR | NR | NR | NR | NR |

Note: USCHO did not release a poll in week 12.
Note: USA Hockey did not release a poll in week 12.
