= 2025–26 Niagara Purple Eagles men's ice hockey season =

- Conference: 8th AHA
- Home ice: Dwyer Arena

Rankings
- USCHO: NR
- USA Hockey: NR

Record
- Overall: 13–23–1
- Conference: 9–16–1
- Home: 11–10–0
- Road: 2–13–1

Coaches and captains
- Head coach: Jason Lammers
- Assistant coaches: Mark Phalon; Niko Kovachis
- Captain: Ethan Lund
- Alternate captain(s): Noah Hackett; Declan McDonnell; Ross Roloson; Spencer Young

The 2025–26 Niagara Purple Eagles men's ice hockey season was the 30th season of play for the program, the 28th at the Division I level and the 2nd in Atlantic Hockey America. The Purple Eagles represented Niagara University in the 2025–26 NCAA Division I men's ice hockey season, played their homes games at the Dwyer Arena and were coached by Jason Lammers in his 9th season.

== Season ==
With Niagara losing its three top scorers from last year, among several others, the Purple Eagles were hard-pressed to replicate their outstanding scoring production. While several new additions would be key features in Niagara's offense over the course of the year, particularly two transfers from Canadian colleges (Declan McDonnell and Jacob Maillet), the team still saw its output fall by nearly a full goal per game (3.35 to 2.51). With the vastly reduced scoring, the team was much more reliant on its defense. The Purple Eagles were better at limiting chances for their opponents but the loss of Pierce Charleson did not serve them well in goal. Deivs Rolovs, in his first season as a starter, put up respectable numbers but his lack of consistency led the team to utilizing Tomas Anderson in several games.

A feature of Niagara's season was the club's poor performance on the road. While the Eagles were able to post a winning record at Dwyer Arena, the team was deficient on the road. In just 3 of 16 away matches did Niagara score more than 2 goals; coincidentally, those games were the only three that did not end up in defeat. The subpar road record led to the team finishing the regular season nine games below .500. While Niagara fell 4 spots in the conference standings, they were nonetheless able to earn a postseason home game and hosted Army in the first round.

Their final home game of the year began well with Niagara scoring three times in the first. With a commanding lead, the team seemed to relax in the second and allowed the Black Knights to claw their way back into the match. Army's three-goal second was followed up with a fourth goal mid-way through the third and put Niagara on the brink. Fortunately for the Eagles, Nicholas Niemo responded just 14 seconds later and knotted the score at 4-all. A little over two minutes afterwards, Noah Hackett converted on the team's fourth power play to put them back into the lead. The defense stiffened and held Army back for the rest of the game, rescuing victory from the Knights. The quarterfinal round pitted the team against Sacred Heart and saw the offense stopped cold. Niagara scored one goal in each of the two games (both by Dallon Melin). They never held the lead and were 1 for 7 on the power play. The offense squandered a solid performance by Rolovs who stopped 55 of 59 shots and gave the Eagles a chance to win both matches.

== Departures ==
Player	Position	Nationality	Cause
Jay Ahearn	Forward	United States	Transferred to Massachusetts Lowell
Noah Carlin	Defenseman	United States	Graduate (signed with Kalamazoo Wings)
Pierce Charleson	Goaltender	Canada	Graduation (signed with Greenville Swamp Rabbits)
Rainers Dārziņš	Forward	Latvia	Graduation (retired)
Braden Doyle	Defenseman	United States	Graduation (signed with Greensboro Gargoyles)
Trevor Hoskin	Forward	Canada	Transferred to Merrimack
Kyler Kleven	Forward	United States	Graduate transfer to Augsburg
Alex Murray	Defenseman	United States	Graduation (signed with Vimmerby HC)
Luke Mylymok	Forward	Canada	Graduation (signed with Rapid City Rush)
Shane Ott	Forward	United States	Graduation (signed with Bloomington Bison)
Lars Christian Rødne	Forward	Norway	Graduation (signed with Adirondack Thunder)
Brett Roloson	Forward	United States	Graduation (signed with Allen Americans)
Tyler Wallace	Forward	Canada	Transferred to Rensselaer
Johnny Wescoe	Forward	United States	Joined club team

== Recruiting ==
Player	Position	Nationality	Age	Notes
Tomas Anderson	Goaltender	United States	20	Stillwater, MN
Mitchell Becker	Defenseman	United States	24	Rogers, MN; transfer from Massachusetts Lowell
Davis Codd	Forward	United States	22	Brighton, MI; joined mid-season
Cameron Eke	Defenseman	Canada	20	St. Catharines, ON
Marshall Finnie	Forward	Canada	21	Lethbridge, AB
Aidan Litke	Forward	Canada	22	Winnipeg, MB; joined mid-season
Jacob Maillet	Forward	Canada	22	Dundas, ON; transfer from St. Francis Xavier
Declan McDonnell	Forward	United States	23	Buffalo, NY; transfer from Saint Mary's; selected 217th overall in 2020
Dallon Melin	Forward	Canada	23	Camrose, AB; transfer from Calgary
Maxim Muranov	Forward	Canada	21	Moskva, RUS
Nicholas Niemo	Forward	United States	24	Middlebury, VT; transfer from Maine
Hunter Wallace	Forward	Canada	22	Oak Lake, MB; transfer from Merrimack
Tyson Zimmer	Forward	Canada	21	Russell, MB

== Roster ==
As of January 1, 2026.

No.	Nat.	Player	Class	Pos	Height	Weight	DoB	Hometown	Previous team	NHL rights
1	(Latvia)	Deivs Rolovs	Sophomore	G	6' 2" (1.88 m)	183 lb (83 kg)	2004-05-08	Riga, Latvia	Lone Star Brahmas (NAHL)	—
2	(United States)	Jonathan Ziskie	Senior	F	6' 3" (1.91 m)	187 lb (85 kg)	2001-03-19	Macomb, Michigan	Bismarck Bobcats (NAHL)	—
3	(United States)	Mitchell Becker	Senior	D	6' 3" (1.91 m)	220 lb (100 kg)	2001-05-24	Rogers, Minnesota	Massachusetts Lowell (HEA)	—
4	(Latvia)	Gļebs Prohorenkovs	Senior	F	6' 2" (1.88 m)	187 lb (85 kg)	2001-11-12	Riga, Latvia	Amarillo Wranglers (NAHL)	—
8	(Canada)	Cameron Eke	Freshman	D	6' 2" (1.88 m)	198 lb (90 kg)	2005-04-23	St. Catharines, Ontario	Collingwood Blues (OJHL)	—
9	(Canada)	Nathan Oickle	Sophomore	D	5' 10" (1.78 m)	165 lb (75 kg)	2003-02-05	Peterborough, Ontario	Surrey Eagles (BCHL)	—
10	(Canada)	Hunter Wallace	Sophomore	F	5' 7" (1.7 m)	165 lb (75 kg)	2003-05-02	Oak Lake, Manitoba	Merrimack (HEA)	—
12	(United States)	Ross Roloson (A)	Junior	D	5' 11" (1.8 m)	175 lb (79 kg)	2003-01-30	Woodbury, Minnesota	Lake Superior State (CCHA)	—
13	(Canada)	Grayson Dietrich	Senior	F	6' 2" (1.88 m)	190 lb (86 kg)	2001-12-18	Calgary, Alberta	American International (AHA)	—
14	(Latvia)	Marshall Finnie	Freshman	F	6' 2" (1.88 m)	194 lb (88 kg)	2004-01-02	Lethbridge, Alberta	Edmonton Oil Kings (WHL)	—
15	(Russia)	Maxim Muranov	Freshman	F	6' 2" (1.88 m)	185 lb (84 kg)	2004-06-02	Moskva, Russia	Vancouver Giants (WHL)	—
16	(Canada)	Andy Reist	Sophomore	F	6' 0" (1.83 m)	174 lb (79 kg)	2004-05-15	Waterloo, Ontario	Cobourg Cougars (OJHL)	—
17	(Canada)	Aidan Litke	Freshman	F	6' 1" (1.85 m)	192 lb (87 kg)	2003-03-16	Winnipeg, Manitoba	Evansville Thunderbolts (SPHL)	—
18	(Canada)	Spencer Young (A)	Sophomore	F	6' 0" (1.83 m)	174 lb (79 kg)	2003-08-25	Elmira, Ontario	Collingwood Blues (OJHL)	—
19	(United States)	Drew Vieten	Junior	F	6' 1" (1.85 m)	190 lb (86 kg)	2001-01-10	Calabasas, California	Wichita Falls Warriors (NAHL)	—
20	(Canada)	Tyson Zimmer	Freshman	F	6' 0" (1.83 m)	192 lb (87 kg)	2004-09-05	Russell, Manitoba	Vernon Vipers (BCHL)	—
21	(Canada)	Dallon Melin	Junior	F	6' 4" (1.93 m)	220 lb (100 kg)	2002-03-26	Camrose, Alberta	Calgary (CWUAA)	—
22	(Canada)	Lane Brockhoff	Graduate	D	6' 1" (1.85 m)	207 lb (94 kg)	2000-04-11	Edberg, Alberta	Camrose Kodiaks (AJHL)	—
24	(United States)	Nicholas Niemo	Senior	F	5' 9" (1.75 m)	165 lb (75 kg)	2001-03-28	Middlebury, Vermont	Maine (HEA)	—
25	(United States)	Declan McDonnell (A)	Junior	F	5' 10" (1.78 m)	190 lb (86 kg)	2002-02-25	Buffalo, New York	Saint Mary's (AUS)	TBL, 217th overall 2020
26	(Canada)	Jacob Maillet	Sophomore	F	6' 1" (1.85 m)	205 lb (93 kg)	2003-03-13	Dundas, Ontario	St. Francis Xavier (AUS)	—
27	(Japan)	Ray Murakami	Sophomore	D	6' 0" (1.83 m)	181 lb (82 kg)	2003-04-03	Tomakomai, Japan	Lone Star Brahmas (NAHL)	—
28	(Canada)	Ethan Lund (C)	Senior	D	5' 10" (1.78 m)	185 lb (84 kg)	2001-03-16	Calgary, Alberta	Brooks Bandits (AJHL)	—
29	(United States)	Davis Codd	Freshman	F	5' 10" (1.78 m)	174 lb (79 kg)	2003-08-19	Brighton, Michigan	Kalamazoo Wings (ECHL)	—
30	(United States)	Mitchell Day	Junior	G	5' 10" (1.78 m)	175 lb (79 kg)	2002-01-18	St. Louis, Missouri	North Iowa Bulls (NAHL)	—
31	(United States)	Thomas Anderson	Freshman	G	6' 3" (1.91 m)	201 lb (91 kg)	2004-10-06	Stillwater, Minnesota	Bismarck Bobcats (NAHL)	—
34	(Canada)	Noah Hackett (A)	Senior	F	6' 1" (1.85 m)	174 lb (79 kg)	2001-12-11	Ponoka, Alberta	Brooks Bandits (AJHL)	—

== Standings ==
2025–26 Atlantic Hockey America Standings
	Conference record										Overall record					
	GP	W	L	T	OW	OL	SW	PTS	GF	GA	GP	W	L	T	GF	GA
#20 Bentley †	26	16	6	4	1	0	2	53	85	56	38	22	11	5	119	87
Sacred Heart	26	15	8	3	1	0	1	48	80	61	39	23	13	3	116	93
Robert Morris	26	13	11	2	0	2	2	45	69	69	40	16	21	3	103	128
Holy Cross	26	14	10	2	1	1	1	45	81	69	38	18	18	2	113	116
RIT	26	13	11	2	2	1	2	42	69	68	36	17	17	2	93	96
Air Force	26	13	10	3	2	1	0	41	75	73	37	18	15	4	108	112
Canisius	26	12	12	2	1	0	2	39	81	74	35	17	16	2	107	105
Niagara	26	9	16	1	1	3	0	30	67	83	37	13	23	1	93	118
Army	26	7	15	4	2	3	2	28	61	75	35	12	17	6	91	96
Mercyhurst	26	5	18	3	0	0	1	19	47	87	37	6	28	3	65	143
Championship: March 21, 2026 † indicates conference regular season champion (DeGregorio Trophy) * indicates conference tournament champion (Riley Trophy); Rankings: USCHO.com Top 20 Poll; updated March 16, 2026; Source: AHA

== Schedule and results ==
Date	Time	Opponent^{#}	Rank^{#}	Site	TV	Decision	Result	Attendance	Record
Regular Season
October 4	6:00 pm	St. Lawrence*		Dwyer Arena • Lewiston, New York	FloHockey	Rolovs	W 5–2	982	1–0–0
October 10	6:00 pm	Bowling Green*		Dwyer Arena • Lewiston, New York	FloHockey	Rolovs	W 2–0	609	2–0–0
October 11	5:00 pm	Bowling Green*		Dwyer Arena • Lewiston, New York	FloHockey	Rolovs	W 5–2	887	3–0–0
October 17	8:00 pm	at Union*		M&T Bank Center • Schenectady, New York	ESPN+	Rolovs	L 2–3	1,712	3–1–0
October 18	8:00 pm	at Union*		M&T Bank Center • Schenectady, New York	ESPN+	Anderson	L 0–6	1,426	3–2–0
October 24	6:00 pm	at USNTDP*		Dwyer Arena • Lewiston, New York (Exhibtion)	FloHockey	Day	W 4–1	826	
October 31	7:00 pm	at Robert Morris		Clearview Arena • Neville Township, Pennsylvania	FloHockey	Rolovs	L 2–4	587	3–3–0 (0–1–0)
November 1	6:00 pm	Robert Morris		Dwyer Arena • Lewiston, New York	FloHockey	Rolovs	L 3–4	619	3–4–0 (0–2–0)
November 7	6:00 pm	at Holy Cross		Hart Center • Worcester, Massachusetts	FloHockey	Anderson	L 1–5	927	3–5–0 (0–3–0)
November 8	2:00 pm	at Holy Cross		Hart Center • Worcester, Massachusetts	FloHockey	Rolovs	L 2–6	761	3–6–0 (0–4–0)
November 14	6:00 pm	Army		Dwyer Arena • Lewiston, New York	FloHockey	Anderson	W 6–4	863	4–6–0 (1–4–0)
November 15	5:00 pm	Army		Dwyer Arena • Lewiston, New York	FloHockey	Anderson	W 4–1	657	5–6–0 (2–4–0)
November 18	7:00 pm	RIT		Dwyer Arena • Lewiston, New York	FloHockey	Rolovs	W 2–1 ^{OT}	870	6–6–0 (3–4–0)
November 28	6:00 pm	Rensselaer*		Dwyer Arena • Lewiston, New York	FloHockey	Rolovs	L 4–1	863	6–7–0
November 29	5:00 pm	Rensselaer*		Dwyer Arena • Lewiston, New York	FloHockey	Rolovs	L 2–3	837	6–8–0
December 5	7:00 pm	at Bentley		Bentley Arena • Waltham, Massachusetts	FloHockey	Rolovs	W 3–1	1,319	7–8–0 (4–4–0)
December 6	6:00 pm	at Bentley		Bentley Arena • Waltham, Massachusetts	FloHockey	Rolovs	L 2–3	1,280	7–9–0 (4–5–0)
December 31	2:00 pm	Guelph*		Dwyer Arena • Lewiston, New York (Exhibition)	FloHockey	Anderson	W 4–2	445	
January 3	6:00 pm	Clarkson*		Dwyer Arena • Lewiston, New York	FloHockey	Rolovs	L 2–6	773	7–10–0
January 9	6:00 pm	Sacred Heart		Dwyer Arena • Lewiston, New York	FloHockey	Rolovs	L 4–5 ^{OT}	762	7–11–0 (4–6–0)
January 10	5:00 pm	Sacred Heart		Dwyer Arena • Lewiston, New York	FloHockey	Anderson	L 2–4	754	7–12–0 (4–7–0)
January 16	7:00 pm	at Mercyhurst		Mercyhurst Ice Center • Erie, Pennsylvania	FloHockey	Anderson	L 0–3	894	7–13–0 (4–8–0)
January 17	6:00 pm	Mercyhurst		Dwyer Arena • Lewiston, New York	FloHockey	Anderson	L 2–4	270	7–14–0 (4–9–0)
January 23	6:00 pm	RIT		Dwyer Arena • Lewiston, New York	FloHockey	Rolovs	L 2–4	598	7–15–0 (4–10–0)
January 24	7:00 pm	at RIT		Gene Polisseni Center • Henrietta, New York	FloHockey	Day	T 3–3 ^{SOL}	3,533	7–15–1 (4–10–1)
January 30	7:00 pm	at Canisius		LECOM Harborcenter • Buffalo, New York (Rivalry)	FloHockey	Day	W 5–3	1,367	8–15–1 (5–10–1)
January 31	7:00 pm	Canisius		Dwyer Arena • Lewiston, New York (Rivalry)	FloHockey	Anderson	L 3–4 ^{OT}	1,186	8–16–1 (5–11–1)
February 6	6:00 pm	Air Force		Dwyer Arena • Lewiston, New York	FloHockey	Anderson	L 1–2 ^{OT}	703	8–17–1 (5–12–1)
February 7	6:00 pm	Air Force		Dwyer Arena • Lewiston, New York	FloHockey	Anderson	W 4–2	743	9–17–1 (6–12–1)
February 10	7:00 pm	at RIT		Gene Polisseni Center • Henrietta, New York	FloHockey	Anderson	L 1–2	2,057	9–18–1 (6–13–1)
February 13	6:00 pm	Robert Morris		Dwyer Arena • Lewiston, New York	FloHockey	Anderson	W 5–2	640	10–18–1 (7–13–1)
February 14	7:00 pm	at Robert Morris		Clearview Arena • Neville Township, Pennsylvania	FloHockey	Anderson	L 1–5	848	10–19–1 (7–14–1)
February 20	7:00 pm	at Mercyhurst		Mercyhurst Ice Center • Erie, Pennsylvania	FloHockey	Rolovs	L 2–3	853	10–20–1 (7–15–1)
February 21	7:00 pm	Mercyhurst		Dwyer Arena • Lewiston, New York	FloHockey	Rolovs	W 3–1	846	11–20–1 (8–15–1)
February 27	6:00 pm	Canisius		Dwyer Arena • Lewiston, New York (Rivalry)	FloHockey	Rolovs	W 3–2	1,187	12–20–1 (9–15–1)
February 28	6:00 pm	at Canisius		LECOM Harborcenter • Buffalo, New York (Rivalry)	FloHockey	Rolovs	L 1–5	903	12–21–1 (9–16–1)
Atlantic Hockey America Tournament
March 3	7:00 pm	Army*		Dwyer Arena • Lewiston, New York (AHA First Round)	FloHockey	Rolovs	W 5–4	323	13–21–1
March 6	7:00 pm	at Sacred Heart*		Martire Family Arena • Fairfield, Connecticut (AHA Quarterfinal Game 1)	FloHockey	Rolovs	L 1–3	1,374	13–22–1
March 7	5:00 pm	at Sacred Heart*		Martire Family Arena • Fairfield, Connecticut (AHA Quarterfinal Game 2)	FloHockey	Rolovs	L 1–2	1,613	13–23–1
*Non-conference game. ^{#}Rankings from USCHO.com Poll. All times are in Eastern Time. Source:

== Scoring statistics ==
Name	Position	Games	Goals	Assists	Points	PIM
Declan McDonnell	C/RW	37	12	14	26	20
Maxim Muranov	F	33	8	14	22	26
Jacob Maillet	C	37	8	14	22	8
Marshall Finnie	F	37	12	9	21	69
Spencer Young	C	37	9	12	21	25
Noah Hackett	F	37	12	6	18	31
Gļebs Prohorenkovs	C	36	1	16	17	20
Nathan Oickle	D	34	2	12	14	19
Lane Brockhoff	D	34	3	10	13	27
Dallon Melin	LW	29	5	6	11	29
Jonathan Ziskie	D	32	4	7	11	18
Nicholas Niemo	F	24	3	7	10	4
Ross Roloson	D	37	2	7	9	12
Andy Reist	F	34	1	8	9	10
Mitchell Becker	D	37	0	8	8	30
Ethan Lund	D	36	2	4	6	14
Ray Murakami	D	27	1	4	5	4
Grayson Dietrich	C/LW	36	1	4	5	22
Tyson Zimmer	RW	14	2	2	4	6
Hunter Wallace	F	26	2	2	4	18
Davis Codd	RW	12	2	1	3	2
Aidan Litke	F	12	1	1	2	26
Cameron Eke	D	24	0	1	1	10
Drew Vieten	F	1	0	0	0	0
Mitchell Day	G	5	0	0	0	0
Tomas Anderson	G	16	0	0	0	0
Deivs Rolovs	G	23	0	0	0	0
Bench	–	–	–	–	–	14
Total			93	167	260	452

== Goaltending statistics ==
Name	Games	Minutes	Wins	Losses	Ties	Goals against	Saves	Shut outs	SV %	GAA
Mitchell Day	5	213:30	1	0	1	9	96	0	.914	2.53
Deivs Rolovs	24	1195:44	8	14	0	58	549	1	.904	2.91
Tomas Anderson	16	805:30	4	9	0	43	349	0	.890	3.20
Empty Net	-	21:39	-	-	-	8	-	-	-	-
Total	37	2236:23	13	23	1	118	994	1	.894	3.17

== Rankings ==
Poll	Week																											
Poll	Pre	1	2	3	4	5	6	7	8	9	10	11	12	13	14	15	16	17	18	19	20	21	22	23	24	25	26	27 (Final)
USCHO.com	NR	NR	RV	RV	NR	NR	NR	NR	NR	NR	NR	NR	–	NR	NR	NR	NR	NR	NR	NR	NR	NR	NR	NR	NR	NR	NR	NR
USA Hockey	NR	NR	RV	NR	NR	NR	NR	NR	NR	NR	NR	NR	–	NR	NR	NR	NR	NR	NR	NR	NR	NR	NR	NR	NR	NR	NR	NR

Note: USCHO did not release a poll in week 12.
Note: USA Hockey did not release a poll in week 12.
