= 2025–26 Air Force Falcons men's ice hockey season =

- Conference: 6th AHA
- Home ice: Cadet Ice Arena

Rankings
- USCHO: NR
- USA Hockey: NR

Record
- Overall: 18–15–4
- Conference: 13–10–3
- Home: 7–8–3
- Road: 10–7–1
- Neutral: 1–0–0

Coaches and captains
- Head coach: Frank Serratore
- Assistant coaches: Andy Berg; Joe Doyle; Steve Jennings
- Captain(s): Chris Hedden; Mason McCormick; Holt Oliphant
- Alternate captain(s): Brendan Gibbons; Will Staring

The 2025–26 Air Force Falcons men's ice hockey season was the 58th season of play for the program and the 2nd in Atlantic Hockey America. The Falcons represented the United States Air Force Academy in the 2025–26 NCAA Division I men's ice hockey season, played their home games at the Cadet Ice Arena and were coached by Frank Serratore in his 29th season.

== Season ==
At the start of the season, Air Force had to figure out who would be taking over in net from the now-graduated Guy Blessing. Carter Clafton got his chance first and initially looked like he may have been a diamond in the rough. Holding perennial power Denver to a single goal in the season opener was more than the Falcons could have hoped for. However, the succeeding few weeks did not go well for the junior. While he was able to backstop the team to its first victory of the season, Clafton was lit up in a majority of his starts and gave Air Force little chance to win. By October 25, coach Serratore decided to make a change and gave Dominik Wasik his first start against RIT. While Wasik didn't put up a strong performance in the game, an injury forced him out of the match for just over 8 minutes. During thar stretch, Clafton faced 4 shots and allowed two to get past him. The very next game, Wasik seemed to grow more comfortable in goal and posted the four shutouts on the season. Wasik remained in control of the Falcons' cage for the remainder of the season with Clafton playing just 20 minutes in goal after October.

With the situation in net resolved, Air Force was able to get over its poor start and ran through its remaining slate in '25 without too much trouble. While there was no primary scoring threat for the team, the Falcons were able to get scoring from across its lineup with eleven plyers finishing in double-digits. The team averaged just less than 3 goals per game which, while not astounding, was a sufficient number to have the team competitive throughout the year. Team co-captain Chris Hedden led the club in scoring, finishing second in the nation in points per game by a defenseman.

Unfortunately for Air Force, the lack of a consistent scoring threat did end up causing problems in a few games and the team went through two poor stretches in the second half. With the conference standings skewed thanks to a few programs underperforming, Air Force managed to finishing in the bottom half of the AHA despite finishing three games above .500. Their unfortunate finish left the team faced with a road trip to Pittsburgh for the quarterfinals and a showdown with Robert Morris. The first game saw Air Force get off to a good start with goals in each of the first two periods. RMU was able to fight back in the third, scoring two goals in the final six minutes to tie the game and force overtime. It wasn't until the middle of the second extra period, on the Falcons' 51st shot of the match, that they were able to pull out a victory and take the series lead.

Robert Morris' netminder then took over for the remainder of the series and stymied the Falcons. The second game was taken by the Colonials 4–1 with the two teams playing fairly evenly for the night. The deciding match, however, was tilted heavily in the Falcons' favor with Air Force vastly outshooting the home team 62–17. Unfortunately, Wasik had a poor night in goal and allowed 4 shots to get behind him. While the Falcons were able to fight break through in the third, they were unable to claw back all the way to even and a pair of late markers sealed their fate.

== Departures ==
| Player | Position | Nationality | Cause |
|---|---|---|---|
| Guy Blessing | Goaltender | United States | Graduation (retired) |
| Cooper Boulanger | Forward | United States | Transferred to club team |
| James Callahan | Defenseman | United States | Left program (retired) |
| Clay Cosentino | Forward | United States | Graduation (retired) |
| Lucas Coon | Forward | United States | Graduation (retired) |
| Andrew DeCarlo | Forward | United States | Graduation (retired) |
| Mitchell Digby | Defenseman | United States | Graduation (retired) |
| Liam Hansson | Forward/Defenseman | United States | Left program (retired) |
| Sam Jacobs | Forward | United States | Transferred to club team |
| Jasper Lester | Defenseman | United States | Graduation (retired) |
| Austin Schwartz | Forward | United States | Graduation (retired) |
| Ethan Ullrick | Forward | United States | Transferred to Tufts |

== Recruiting ==
| Player | Position | Nationality | Age | Notes |
|---|---|---|---|---|
| Calvin Beard | Defenseman | United States | 19 | Southborough, MA |
| Cole Christian | Forward | United States | 21 | Duluth, MN |
| Nate Farrell | Defenseman | United States | 21 | Wheaton, IL |
| Oliver Genest | Forward | United States | 21 | Sanford, ME |
| Simon Houge | Defenseman | United States | 21 | Woodbury, MN |
| Dylan Krick | Goaltender | United States | 20 | West Chester, PA |
| Cade Moxham | Forward | United States | 21 | Calgary, AB |
| Hayden Nichol | Forward | United States | 22 | Rochester, NY |
| Charles Panchisin | Forward | United States | 20 | Lincolnshire, IL |
| Zane Spaniol | Goaltender | United States | 20 | Ham Lake, MN |
| Aidan Willis | Forward | United States | 20 | Farmington, MN |

== Roster ==
As of August 12, 2025.

| No. | Nat. | Player | Class | Pos | Height | Weight | DoB | Hometown | Previous team | NHL rights |
|---|---|---|---|---|---|---|---|---|---|---|
| 2 | (United States) | Beau Janzig | Sophomore | D | 6' 2" (1.88 m) | 201 lb (91 kg) | 2003-11-17 | Hermantown, Minnesota | Minnesota Wilderness (NAHL) | — |
| 3 | (United States) | Rem Morque | Sophomore | D | 6' 1" (1.85 m) | 190 lb (86 kg) | 2003-11-12 | Grand Rapids, Minnesota | Minnesota Wilderness (NAHL) | — |
| 4 | (United States) | Will Jones | Sophomore | D | 5' 9" (1.75 m) | 170 lb (77 kg) | 2004-03-09 | Brentwood, Tennessee | Powell River Kings (BCHL) | — |
| 6 | (United States) | Simon Houge | Freshman | F | 5' 7" (1.7 m) | 172 lb (78 kg) | 2004-09-24 | Woodbury, Minnesota | West Kelowna Warriors (BCHL) | — |
| 7 | (United States) | Jake Peterson | Sophomore | D | 6' 2" (1.88 m) | 190 lb (86 kg) | 2003-10-02 | Rosemount, Minnesota | Bismarck Bobcats (NAHL) | — |
| 8 | (United States) | Cole Christian | Freshman | F | 5' 8" (1.73 m) | 154 lb (70 kg) | 2004-06-21 | Duluth, Minnesota | Anchorage Wolverines (NAHL) | — |
| 9 | (United States) | Anthony Yu | Sophomore | F | 5' 9" (1.75 m) | 181 lb (82 kg) | 2004-07-10 | Baldwin Park, California | Powell River Kings (BCHL) | — |
| 10 | (United States) | Oliver Genest | Freshman | F | 6' 1" (1.85 m) | 194 lb (88 kg) | 2004-03-19 | Sanford, Maine | New Hampshire Mountain Kings (NAHL) | — |
| 12 | (United States) | Cade Moxham | Freshman | F | 6' 2" (1.88 m) | 201 lb (91 kg) | 2004-03-09 | Calgary, Alberta | Aberdeen Wings (NAHL) | — |
| 13 | (United States) | Mason McCormick (C) | Senior | F | 6' 4" (1.93 m) | 205 lb (93 kg) | 2001-05-25 | Verona, Wisconsin | Waterloo Black Hawks (USHL) | — |
| 14 | (United States) | Will Dawson | Sophomore | F | 6' 0" (1.83 m) | 183 lb (83 kg) | 2003-10-03 | Traverse City, Michigan | Minot Minotauros (NAHL) | — |
| 15 | (United States) | Owen Dubois | Junior | F | 6' 4" (1.93 m) | 200 lb (91 kg) | 2002-07-06 | Madison, Wisconsin | Aberdeen Wings (NAHL) | — |
| 18 | (United States) | Holt Oliphant (C) | Senior | F | 5' 10" (1.78 m) | 190 lb (86 kg) | 2001-05-17 | Northbrook, Illinois | Johnstown Tomahawks (NAHL) | — |
| 19 | (United States) | Calvin Beard | Freshman | D | 6' 2" (1.88 m) | 179 lb (81 kg) | 2005-10-04 | Southborough, Massachusetts | Powell River Kings (BCHL) | — |
| 20 | (United States) | Nolan Cunningham | Junior | D | 6' 2" (1.88 m) | 185 lb (84 kg) | 2001-12-17 | Helena, Montana | Fairbanks Ice Dogs (NAHL) | — |
| 21 | (United States) | Hayden Nichol | Freshman | F | 6' 1" (1.85 m) | 190 lb (86 kg) | 2003-06-30 | Rochester, New York | Shreveport Mudbugs (NAHL) | — |
| 22 | (United States) | Chris Hedden (C) | Senior | D | 6' 0" (1.83 m) | 185 lb (84 kg) | 2002-09-20 | Kalamazoo, Michigan | Omaha Lancers (USHL) | — |
| 23 | (United States) | Nick Sajevic | Sophomore | F | 5' 11" (1.8 m) | 174 lb (79 kg) | 2003-01-15 | Shoreview, Minnesota | Janesville Jets (NAHL) | — |
| 26 | (United States) | Michael Kadlecik | Sophomore | F | 6' 0" (1.83 m) | 170 lb (77 kg) | 2004-04-14 | Lansing, New York | Odessa Jackalopes (NAHL) | — |
| 27 | (United States) | Samuel Stitz | Sophomore | F | 6' 1" (1.85 m) | 200 lb (91 kg) | 2003-06-18 | Perry Hall, Maryland | Maryland Black Bears (NAHL) | — |
| 30 | (United States) | Dominik Wasik | Junior | G | 6' 1" (1.85 m) | 165 lb (75 kg) | 2002-07-02 | Superior, Wisconsin | Steinbach Pistons (MJHL) | — |
| 33 | (United States) | Zane Spaniol | Freshman | G | 6' 3" (1.91 m) | 185 lb (84 kg) | 2004-09-29 | Ham Lake, Minnesota | Minnesota Mallards (NAHL) | — |
| 35 | (United States) | Carter Clafton | Junior | G | 6' 2" (1.88 m) | 175 lb (79 kg) | 2002-03-13 | Grand Rapids, Minnesota | Amarillo Wranglers (NAHL) | — |
| 37 | (United States) | Toby Hopp | Sophomore | G | 6' 1" (1.85 m) | 185 lb (84 kg) | 2004-06-27 | Maple Grove, Minnesota | Northeast Generals (NAHL) | — |
| 39 | (United States) | Dylan Krick | Freshman | G | 6' 2" (1.88 m) | 146 lb (66 kg) | 2005-06-19 | West Chester, Pennsylvania | Cowichan Valley Capitals (BCHL) | — |
| 44 | (United States) | Will Staring (A) | Sophomore | D | 6' 2" (1.88 m) | 195 lb (88 kg) | 2003-02-28 | Springfield, Virginia | Dubuque Fighting Saints (USHL) | — |
| 48 | (United States) | Nick Remissong | Junior | F | 6' 0" (1.83 m) | 185 lb (84 kg) | 2002-05-19 | Lake Forest, Illinois | Trail Smoke Eaters (BCHL) | — |
| 58 | (United States) | Nate Farrell | Freshman | D | 6' 0" (1.83 m) | 185 lb (84 kg) | 2004-02-09 | Wheaton, Illinois | Wisconsin Windigo (NAHL) | — |
| 64 | (United States) | Brendan Gibbons (A) | Sophomore | F | 6' 2" (1.88 m) | 205 lb (93 kg) | 2002-06-15 | South Kingstown, Rhode Island | Maine Nordiques (NAHL) | — |
| 72 | (United States) | Aidan Willis | Freshman | F | 5' 11" (1.8 m) | 185 lb (84 kg) | 2005-01-11 | Farmington, Minnesota | Salmon Arm Silverbacks (BCHL) | — |
| 81 | (United States) | Charles Panchisin | Freshman | F | 5' 10" (1.78 m) | 174 lb (79 kg) | 2004-11-15 | Lincolnshire, Illinois | Philadelphia Rebels (NAHL) | — |

== Standings ==
2025–26 Atlantic Hockey America Standings
| | Conference record | | | | | | | | | | Overall record | | | | | |
| | GP | W | L | T | OW | OL | SW | PTS | GF | GA | GP | W | L | T | GF | GA |
|---|---|---|---|---|---|---|---|---|---|---|---|---|---|---|---|---|
| #20 Bentley †* | 26 | 16 | 6 | 4 | 1 | 0 | 2 | 53 | 85 | 56 | 40 | 23 | 12 | 5 | 122 | 94 |
| Sacred Heart | 26 | 15 | 8 | 3 | 1 | 0 | 1 | 48 | 80 | 61 | 40 | 23 | 14 | 3 | 118 | 96 |
| Robert Morris | 26 | 13 | 11 | 2 | 0 | 2 | 2 | 45 | 69 | 69 | 40 | 16 | 21 | 3 | 103 | 128 |
| Holy Cross | 26 | 14 | 10 | 2 | 1 | 1 | 1 | 45 | 81 | 69 | 38 | 18 | 18 | 2 | 113 | 116 |
| RIT | 26 | 13 | 11 | 2 | 2 | 1 | 2 | 42 | 69 | 68 | 36 | 17 | 17 | 2 | 93 | 96 |
| Air Force | 26 | 13 | 10 | 3 | 2 | 1 | 0 | 41 | 75 | 73 | 37 | 18 | 15 | 4 | 108 | 112 |
| Canisius | 26 | 12 | 12 | 2 | 1 | 0 | 2 | 39 | 81 | 74 | 35 | 17 | 16 | 2 | 107 | 105 |
| Niagara | 26 | 9 | 16 | 1 | 1 | 3 | 0 | 30 | 67 | 83 | 37 | 13 | 23 | 1 | 93 | 118 |
| Army | 26 | 7 | 15 | 4 | 2 | 3 | 2 | 28 | 61 | 75 | 35 | 12 | 17 | 6 | 91 | 96 |
| Mercyhurst | 26 | 5 | 18 | 3 | 0 | 0 | 1 | 19 | 47 | 87 | 37 | 6 | 28 | 3 | 65 | 143 |
Championship: March 21, 2026 † indicates conference regular season champion (DeGregorio Trophy) * indicates conference tournament champion (Riley Trophy); Rankings: USCHO.com Top 20 Poll; updated April 15, 2026; Source: AHA

== Schedule and results ==
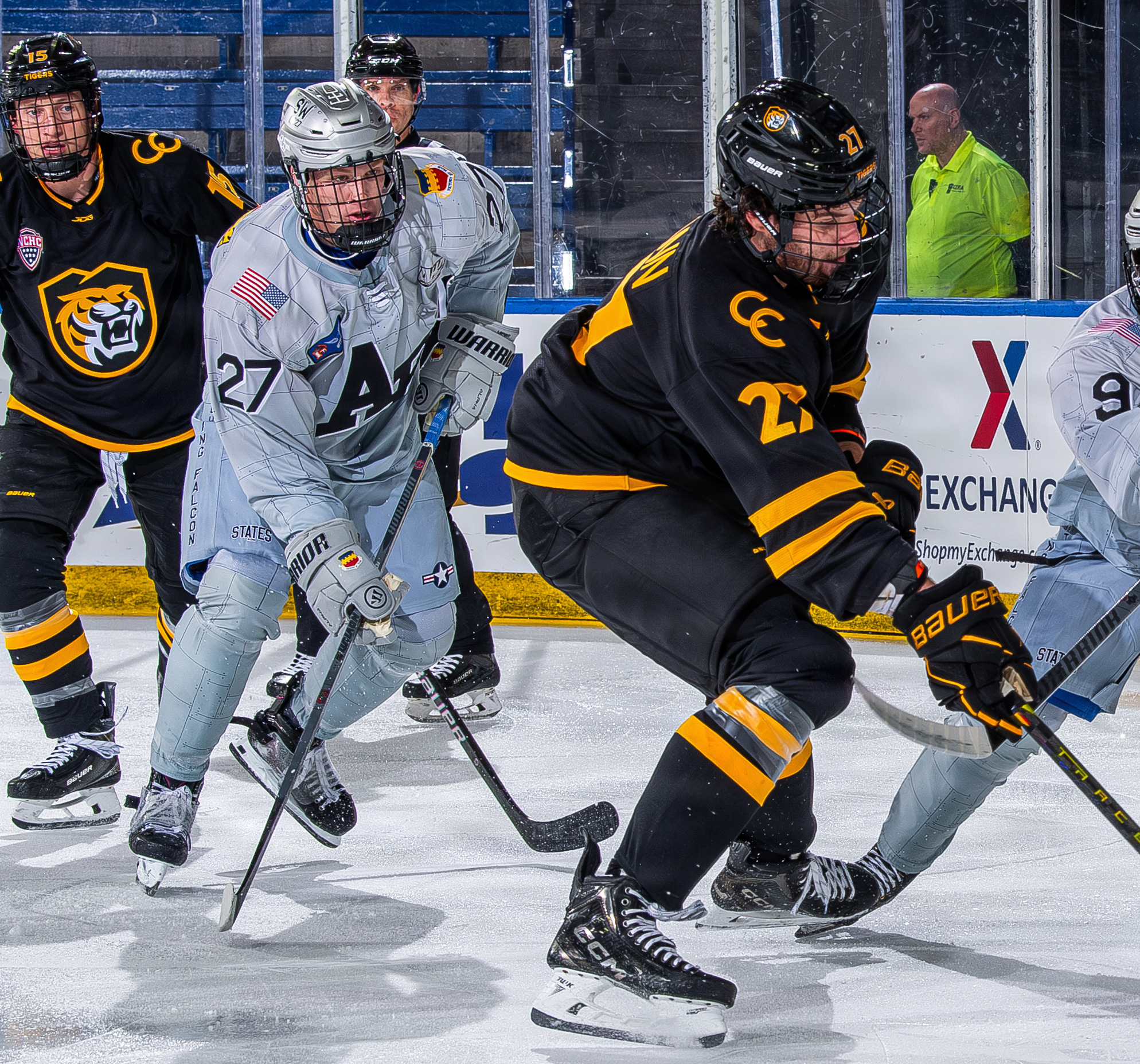
October 11 against Colorado College

| Date | Time | Opponent^{#} | Rank^{#} | Site | TV | Decision | Result | Attendance | Record |
Exhibition
| October 3 | 6:07 pm | at Omaha* | | Baxter Arena • Omaha, Nebraska (Exhibition) | | Clafton | L 2–3 ^{OT} | 7,100 | |
Regular Season
| October 10 | 7:05 pm | #5 Denver* | | Cadet Ice Arena • Colorado Springs, Colorado | FloHockey | Clafton | T 1–1 ^{SOL} | 2,678 | 0–0–1 |
| October 11 | 5:05 pm | Colorado College* | | Cadet Ice Arena • Colorado Springs, Colorado (Rivalry) | Altitude 2, FloHockey | Clafton | L 2–4 | 2,560 | 0–1–1 |
| October 17 | 7:05 pm | St. Thomas* | | Cadet Ice Arena • Colorado Springs, Colorado | FloHockey | Clafton | L 2–11 | 2,317 | 0–2–1 |
| October 18 | 8:05 pm | St. Thomas* | | Cadet Ice Arena • Colorado Springs, Colorado | FloHockey | Clafton | W 6–2 | 2,004 | 1–2–1 |
| October 24 | 5:05 pm | at RIT | | Gene Polisseni Center • Henrietta, New York | FloHockey | Clafton | L 1–5 | 2,443 | 1–3–1 (0–1–0) |
| October 25 | 3:05 pm | at RIT | | Gene Polisseni Center • Henrietta, New York | FloHockey | Wasik | L 3–7 | 2,373 | 1–4–1 (0–2–0) |
| October 31 | 7:05 pm | Brown* | | Cadet Ice Arena • Colorado Springs, Colorado | FloHockey | Wasik | W 2–0 | 2,347 | 2–4–1 |
| November 1 | 5:05 pm | Brown* | | Cadet Ice Arena • Colorado Springs, Colorado | FloHockey | Wasik | W 4–3 | 2,398 | 3–4–1 |
| November 7 | 5:00 pm | at Sacred Heart | | Martire Family Arena • Fairfield, Connecticut | FloHockey | Wasik | W 4–1 | 3,191 | 4–4–1 (1–2–0) |
| November 8 | 5:00 pm | at Sacred Heart | | Martire Family Arena • Fairfield, Connecticut | FloHockey | Wasik | W 3–2 | 3,450 | 5–4–1 (2–2–0) |
| November 14 | 7:05 pm | Holy Cross | | Cadet Ice Arena • Colorado Springs, Colorado | FloHockey | Wasik | L 2–3 | 2,284 | 5–5–1 (2–3–0) |
| November 15 | 7:05 pm | Holy Cross | | Cadet Ice Arena • Colorado Springs, Colorado | FloHockey | Wasik | L 1–4 | 2,357 | 5–6–1 (2–4–0) |
| November 21 | 5:00 pm | at Army | | Tate Rink • West Point, New York (Rivalry) | FloHockey | Wasik | W 6–3 | 2,432 | 6–6–1 (3–4–0) |
| November 23 | 2:00 pm | at Army | | Tate Rink • West Point, New York (Rivalry) | FloHockey | Wasik | W 3–2 ^{OT} | 2,088 | 7–6–1 (4–4–0) |
| November 28 | 11:00 am | at Canisius | | LECOM Harborcenter • Buffalo, New York | FloHockey | Wasik | W 6–3 | 667 | 8–6–1 (5–4–0) |
| November 29 | 11:00 am | at Canisius | | LECOM Harborcenter • Buffalo, New York | FloHockey | Wasik | T 3–3 ^{SOL} | 653 | 8–6–2 (5–4–1) |
| December 5 | 7:05 pm | Robert Morris | | Cadet Ice Arena • Colorado Springs, Colorado | FloHockey, Altitude 2 | Wasik | W 4–1 | 2,280 | 9–6–2 (6–4–1) |
| December 6 | 5:05 pm | Robert Morris | | Cadet Ice Arena • Colorado Springs, Colorado | FloHockey, Altitude | Wasik | L 3–6 | 2,412 | 9–7–2 (6–5–1) |
Desert Hockey Classic
| January 2 | 3:00 pm | vs. Michigan Tech* | | Mullett Arena • Tempe, Arizona (Desert Hockey Semifinal) | | Wasik | W 8–2 | 2,500 | 10–7–2 |
| January 3 | 7:00 pm | Arizona State* | | Mullett Arena • Tempe, Arizona (Desert Hockey Championship) | | Wasik | L 2–5 | 4,556 | 10–8–2 |
| January 9 | 7:05 pm | Bentley | | Cadet Ice Arena • Colorado Springs, Colorado | FloHockey | Wasik | L 1–5 | 2,529 | 10–9–2 (6–6–1) |
| January 10 | 5:05 pm | Bentley | | Cadet Ice Arena • Colorado Springs, Colorado | FloHockey | Wasik | L 1–3 | 2,396 | 10–10–2 (6–7–1) |
| January 16 | 5:00 pm | at Holy Cross | | Hart Center • Worcester, Massachusetts | FloHockey | Wasik | L 2–3 ^{OT} | 918 | 10–11–2 (6–8–1) |
| January 17 | 5:00 pm | at Holy Cross | | Hart Center • Worcester, Massachusetts | FloHockey | Wasik | W 5–2 | 828 | 11–11–2 (7–8–1) |
| January 30 | 7:05 pm | Sacred Heart | | Cadet Ice Arena • Colorado Springs, Colorado | FloHockey | Wasik | W 5–2 | 2,418 | 12–11–2 (8–8–1) |
| January 31 | 5:05 pm | Sacred Heart | | Cadet Ice Arena • Colorado Springs, Colorado | FloHockey | Wasik | W 2–0 | 2,399 | 13–11–2 (9–8–1) |
| February 6 | 4:00 pm | at Niagara | | Dwyer Arena • Lewiston, New York | FloHockey | Wasik | W 2–1 ^{OT} | 703 | 14–11–2 (10–8–1) |
| February 7 | 4:00 pm | at Niagara | | Dwyer Arena • Lewiston, New York | FloHockey | Wasik | L 2–4 | 743 | 14–12–2 (10–9–1) |
| February 13 | 7:05 pm | Mercyhurst | | Cadet Ice Arena • Colorado Springs, Colorado | FloHockey | Wasik | T 3–3 ^{SOL} | 2,468 | 14–12–3 (10–9–2) |
| February 14 | 5:05 pm | Mercyhurst | | Cadet Ice Arena • Colorado Springs, Colorado | FloHockey | Wasik | W 5–4 | 2,238 | 15–12–3 (11–9–2) |
| February 20 | 7:05 pm | Army | | Cadet Ice Arena • Colorado Springs, Colorado (Rivalry) | FloHockey | Wasik | L 3–4 | 2,820 | 15–13–3 (11–10–2) |
| February 21 | 5:05 pm | Army | | Cadet Ice Arena • Colorado Springs, Colorado (Rivalry) | FloHockey | Wasik | T 0–0 ^{SOL} | 2,809 | 15–13–4 (11–10–3) |
| February 27 | 5:00 pm | at Bentley | | Bentley Arena • Waltham, Massachusetts | FloHockey | Wasik | W 3–2 | 1,513 | 16–13–4 (12–10–3) |
| February 28 | 4:00 pm | at Bentley | | Bentley Arena • Waltham, Massachusetts | FloHockey | Wasik | W 2–0 | 1,490 | 17–13–4 (13–10–3) |
Atlantic Hockey America Tournament
| March 6 | 5:05 pm | at Robert Morris* | | Clearview Arena • Neville Township, Pennsylvania (AHA Quarterfinal Game 1) | FloHockey | Wasik | W 3–2 ^{2OT} | 952 | 18–13–4 |
| March 7 | 5:05 pm | at Robert Morris* | | Clearview Arena • Neville Township, Pennsylvania (AHA Quarterfinal Game 2) | FloHockey | Wasik | L 1–4 | 853 | 18–14–4 |
| March 8 | 3:05 pm | at Robert Morris* | | Clearview Arena • Neville Township, Pennsylvania (AHA Quarterfinal Game 3) | FloHockey | Wasik | L 2–5 | 814 | 18–15–4 |
*Non-conference game. ^{#}Rankings from USCHO.com Poll. All times are in Mountain Time. Source:

== Scoring statistics ==
| Name | Position | Games | Goals | Assists | Points | PIM |
|---|---|---|---|---|---|---|
| Chris Hedden | D | 37 | 12 | 22 | 34 | 14 |
| Samuel Stitz | F | 34 | 11 | 21 | 32 | 20 |
| Nick Sajevic | F | 37 | 9 | 23 | 32 | 22 |
| Will Dawson | F | 37 | 11 | 14 | 25 | 23 |
| Nolan Cunningham | D | 37 | 7 | 13 | 20 | 18 |
| Brendan Gibbons | C | 37 | 6 | 14 | 20 | 14 |
| Will Staring | D | 37 | 6 | 13 | 19 | 37 |
| Mason McCormick | LW | 28 | 7 | 9 | 16 | 32 |
| Holt Oliphant | F | 37 | 7 | 9 | 16 | 10 |
| Jake Peterson | D | 35 | 5 | 11 | 16 | 14 |
| Aidan Willis | F | 34 | 3 | 7 | 10 | 20 |
| Ren Morque | D | 35 | 3 | 5 | 8 | 10 |
| Oliver Genest | F | 24 | 5 | 2 | 7 | 8 |
| Cole Christian | F | 33 | 3 | 4 | 7 | 18 |
| Anthony Yu | F | 34 | 3 | 4 | 7 | 20 |
| Owen Dubois | F | 29 | 2 | 4 | 6 | 6 |
| Charles Panchisin | F | 33 | 2 | 3 | 5 | 6 |
| Nicholas Remissong | F | 20 | 2 | 2 | 4 | 8 |
| Hayden Nichol | F | 24 | 2 | 2 | 4 | 8 |
| Michael Kadlecik | F | 16 | 1 | 3 | 4 | 8 |
| Beau Janzig | D | 37 | 1 | 3 | 4 | 10 |
| Cade Moxham | C/LW | 4 | 0 | 1 | 1 | 0 |
| Carter Clafton | G | 7 | 0 | 1 | 1 | 0 |
| Simon Houge | D | 13 | 0 | 1 | 1 | 0 |
| Dominik Wasik | G | 34 | 0 | 1 | 1 | 0 |
| Toby Hopp | G | 1 | 0 | 0 | 0 | 0 |
| Will Jones | D | 1 | 0 | 0 | 0 | 0 |
| Calvin Beard | D | 4 | 0 | 0 | 0 | 0 |
| Total | | | 108 | 191 | 299 | 330 |

== Goaltending statistics ==
| Name | Games | Minutes | Wins | Losses | Ties | Goals against | Saves | Shutouts | SV % | GAA |
|---|---|---|---|---|---|---|---|---|---|---|
| Dominik Wasik | 34 | 1971:17 | 17 | 12 | 3 | 81 | 790 | 4 | .907 | 2.47 |
| Carter Clafton | 9 | 259:57 | 1 | 3 | 1 | 16 | 135 | 0 | .894 | 3.69 |
| Toby Hopp | 1 | 22:33 | 0 | 0 | 0 | 5 | 13 | 0 | .722 | 13.30 |
| Empty Net | - | 20:18 | - | - | - | 10 | - | - | - | - |
| Total | 37 | 2274:05 | 18 | 15 | 4 | 112 | 938 | 4 | .885 | 2.96 |

== Rankings ==
Ranking movements Legend: — = Not ranked
| | Week | | | | | | | | | | | | | | | | | | | | | | | | | | | |
| Poll | Pre | 1 | 2 | 3 | 4 | 5 | 6 | 7 | 8 | 9 | 10 | 11 | 12 | 13 | 14 | 15 | 16 | 17 | 18 | 19 | 20 | 21 | 22 | 23 | 24 | 25 | 26 | Final |
|---|---|---|---|---|---|---|---|---|---|---|---|---|---|---|---|---|---|---|---|---|---|---|---|---|---|---|---|---|
| USCHO.com | — | — | — | — | — | — | — | — | — | — | — | — | * | — | — | — | — | — | — | — | — | — | — | — | — | — | — | — |
| USA Hockey | — | — | — | — | — | — | — | — | — | — | — | — | * | — | — | — | — | — | — | — | — | — | — | — | — | — | — | — |

NOTE: USCHO did not relaease a week 12 poll
NOTE: USA Hockey did not relaease a week 12 poll
