= 2025–26 Clarkson Golden Knights men's ice hockey season =

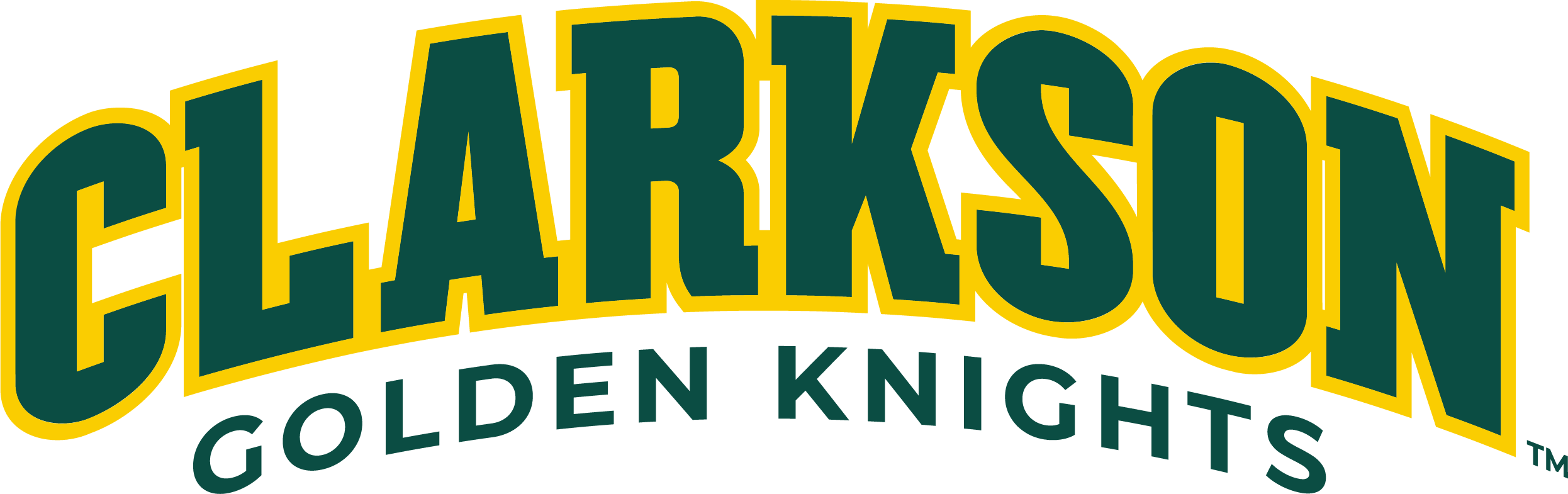
- Conference: ECAC Hockey
- Home ice: Cheel Arena

Record
- Overall: 18–16–3
- Conference: 9–10–3
- Home: 8–6–2
- Road: 9–9–1
- Neutral: 1–1–0

Coaches and captains
- Head coach: Jean-François Houle
- Assistant coaches: Chris Brooks; Corey Leivermann; Sebastian Ragno

The 2025–26 Clarkson Golden Knights Men's ice hockey season will be the 104th season of play for the program and 65th in ECAC Hockey. The Golden Knights will represent Clarkson University in the 2025–26 NCAA Division I men's ice hockey season, play their home games at Cheel Arena and be coached by Jean-François Houle in his 2nd season.

== Departures ==
| Player | Position | Nationality | Cause |
|---|---|---|---|
| Marcus Brännman | Goaltender | Sweden | Signed professional contract (Hanvikens SK) |
| Garrett Dahm | Forward | United States | Graduation (retired) |
| Brady Egan | Forward | Canada | Left program (retired) |
| Ray Fust | Forward | Switzerland | Transferred to Sacred Heart |
| George Grannis | Forward | United States | Graduation (retired) |
| Ethan Langenegger | Goaltender | Canada | Graduation (signed with Syracuse Crunch) |
| Caden Lewandowski | Defenseman | United States | Graduation (retired) |
| Ayrton Martino | Forward | Canada | Graduation (signed with Dallas Stars) |
| Brady Parker | Goaltender | United States | Graduation (retired) |
| Ryan Richardson | Forward | Canada | Graduation (retired) |
| Ellis Rickwood | Forward | Canada | Transferred to North Dakota |
| Carter Rose | Defenseman | United States | Transferred to Union |
| Kaelan Taylor | Defenseman | United States | Graduation (signed with Tahoe Knight Monsters) |
| Ryan Taylor | Forward | United States | Transferred to Robert Morris |
| Trey Taylor | Defenseman | Canada | Signed professional contract (Dallas Stars) |

== Recruiting ==
| Player | Position | Nationality | Age | Notes |
|---|---|---|---|---|
| Nick Avakyan | Goaltender | United States | 21 | Glendale, CA |
| Justin Côté | Forward | Canada | 21 | Salaberry-de-Valleyfield, QC |
| Conyr Hellyer | Forward | Canada | 21 | Okotoks, AB |
| Noah Houle | Defenseman | Canada | 21 | Montréal, QC; transfer from Lindenwood |
| Mikael Huchette | Forward | Canada | 22 | Longueuil, QC; transfer from Concordia |
| Jace Letourneau | Forward | Canada | 21 | Arnprior, ON |
| Matthew Mayich | Defenseman | Canada | 20 | Stoney Creek, ON; selected 170th overall in 2023 |
| Adrian Misaljevic | Forward | Canada | 21 | Woodbridge, ON |
| Colton Smith | Forward | United States | 21 | Hershey, PA |
| Shane Soderwall | Goaltender | United States | 23 | Algonquin, IL; transfer from Curry |
| Bryce Sookro | Defenseman | Canada | 21 | Nelson, BC |
| Owen Van Steensel | Forward | Canada | 21 | Ilderton, ON |

== Roster ==
As of August 5, 2025.

| No. | Nat. | Player | Class | Pos | Height | Weight | DoB | Hometown | Previous team | NHL rights |
|---|---|---|---|---|---|---|---|---|---|---|
| 3 | (Canada) | Noah Houle | Sophomore | D | 6' 1" (1.85 m) | 192 lb (87 kg) | 2003-11-16 | Montreal, Quebec | Lindenwood (NCAA) | — |
| 5 | (United States) | Tristan Sarsland | Senior | D | 6' 0" (1.83 m) | 185 lb (84 kg) | 2004-02-25 | Wayzata, Minnesota | Fairbanks Ice Dogs (NAHL) | — |
| 9 | (United States) | Erik Bargholtz | Senior | F | 6' 2" (1.88 m) | 195 lb (88 kg) | 2001-04-12 | Appleton, Wisconsin | Fargo Force (USHL) | — |
| 11 | (United States) | Luka Sukovic | Sophomore | F | 6' 3" (1.91 m) | 201 lb (91 kg) | 2003-11-06 | Lincolnshire, Illinois | Bonnyville Pontiacs (AJHL) | — |
| 13 | (United States) | Shawn O'Donnell | Junior | F | 5' 11" (1.8 m) | 181 lb (82 kg) | 2003-06-21 | Pittsburgh, Pennsylvania | Massachusetts Lowell (HEA) | — |
| 14 | (United States) | Talon Sigurdson | Junior | F | 6' 1" (1.85 m) | 175 lb (79 kg) | 2002-01-11 | Sartell, Minnesota | Des Moines Buccaneers (USHL) | — |
| 16 | (United States) | Ryan Bottrill | Senior | F | 6' 1" (1.85 m) | 185 lb (84 kg) | 2002-02-04 | Chandler, Arizona | Brown (ECAC) | — |
| 18 | (United States) | Colton Smith | Freshman | F | 6' 3" (1.91 m) | 209 lb (95 kg) | 2004-02-09 | Hershey, Pennsylvania | Leamington Flyers (OJHL) | — |
| 19 | (Canada) | Owen Van Steensel | Freshman | F | 5' 10" (1.78 m) | 185 lb (84 kg) | 2004-08-04 | Ilderton, Ontario | Barrie Colts (OHL) | — |
| 20 | (United States) | Jared Mangan | Sophomore | F | 5' 10" (1.78 m) | 172 lb (78 kg) | 2003-04-08 | Charleston, South Carolina | Lincoln Stars (USHL) | — |
| 21 | (Canada) | Matthew Mayich | Freshman | D | 6' 2" (1.88 m) | 196 lb (89 kg) | 2004-12-21 | Stoney Creek, Ontario | Ottawa 67's (OHL) | STL, 170th overall 2023 |
| 23 | (Sweden) | Oliver Moberg | Sophomore | F | 6' 3" (1.91 m) | 210 lb (95 kg) | 2003-02-23 | Bromma, Sweden | Dubuque Fighting Saints (USHL) | — |
| 27 | (Canada) | Tate Taylor | Sophomore | D | 5' 11" (1.8 m) | 174 lb (79 kg) | 2004-05-03 | Richmond, British Columbia | Fargo Force (USHL) | — |
| 28 | (Canada) | Conyr Hellyer | Freshman | F | 5' 9" (1.75 m) | 150 lb (68 kg) | 2004-08-30 | Okotoks, Alberta | Penticton Vees (BCHL) | — |
| 29 | (Canada) | Luke Pakulak | Sophomore | F | 6' 4" (1.93 m) | 205 lb (93 kg) | 2003-07-30 | Surrey, British Columbia | Vernon Vipers (BCHL) | — |
| 30 | (United States) | Shane Soderwall | Junior | G | 6' 2" (1.88 m) | 185 lb (84 kg) | 2002-09-23 | Algonquin, Illinois | Curry (CNE) | — |
| 35 | (Canada) | Keenan Rancier | Graduate | G | 6' 2" (1.88 m) | 183 lb (83 kg) | 2000-06-21 | Victoria, British Columbia | Vermont (HEA) | — |
| 44 | (Canada) | Ty Brassington | Sophomore | D | 6' 1" (1.85 m) | 185 lb (84 kg) | 2004-04-14 | White Rock, British Columbia | Surrey Eagles (BCHL) | — |
| 55 | (Canada) | Jack Sparkes | Sophomore | D | 6' 8" (2.03 m) | 238 lb (108 kg) | 2003-10-20 | Ottawa, Ontario | Chilliwack Chiefs (BCHL) | LAK, 180th overall 2022 |
| 60 | (United States) | Nick Avakyan | Freshman | G | 6' 1" (1.85 m) | 185 lb (84 kg) | 2004-02-18 | Glendale, California | Johnstown Tomahawks (NAHL) | — |
| 72 | (Canada) | Bryce Sookro | Freshman | D | 6' 1" (1.85 m) | 223 lb (101 kg) | 2004-03-28 | Nelson, British Columbia | Cranbrook Bucks (BCHL) | — |
| 81 | (Canada) | Jace Letourneau | Freshman | F | 6' 5" (1.96 m) | 190 lb (86 kg) | 2004-03-04 | Arnprior, Ontario | Brooks Bandits (BCHL) | — |
| 86 | (Canada) | Adrian Misaljevic | Freshman | F | 5' 11" (1.8 m) | 174 lb (79 kg) | 2004-07-10 | Woodbridge, Ontario | Kitchener Rangers (OHL) | — |
| 91 | (Canada) | Mikael Huchette | Sophomore | F | 6' 3" (1.91 m) | 198 lb (90 kg) | 2003-08-01 | Longueuil, Quebec | Concordia (OUA) | — |
| 92 | (Canada) | Justin Côté | Freshman | F | 5' 6" (1.68 m) | 163 lb (74 kg) | 2004-07-11 | Salaberry-de-Valleyfield, Quebec | Québec Remparts (QMJHL) | — |

== Standings ==
2025–26 ECAC Hockey Standings
| | Conference record | | | | | | | | | | Overall record | | | | | |
| | GP | W | L | T | OTW | OTL | SW | PTS | GF | GA | GP | W | L | T | GF | GA |
|---|---|---|---|---|---|---|---|---|---|---|---|---|---|---|---|---|
| #10т Quinnipiac † | 22 | 17 | 4 | 1 | 2 | 0 | 0 | 50 | 102 | 48 | 38 | 26 | 9 | 3 | 157 | 88 |
| #9 Dartmouth * | 22 | 13 | 5 | 4 | 0 | 1 | 3 | 47 | 81 | 53 | 34 | 23 | 7 | 4 | 124 | 70 |
| #8 Cornell | 22 | 15 | 6 | 1 | 1 | 1 | 1 | 47 | 71 | 42 | 33 | 22 | 10 | 1 | 109 | 64 |
| Princeton | 22 | 11 | 9 | 2 | 0 | 1 | 1 | 37 | 63 | 57 | 34 | 18 | 13 | 3 | 103 | 90 |
| Union | 22 | 11 | 9 | 2 | 1 | 1 | 1 | 36 | 71 | 68 | 37 | 22 | 12 | 3 | 140 | 98 |
| Harvard | 22 | 11 | 10 | 1 | 0 | 1 | 0 | 35 | 61 | 64 | 34 | 16 | 16 | 2 | 92 | 100 |
| Colgate | 22 | 9 | 10 | 3 | 2 | 0 | 2 | 30 | 68 | 74 | 37 | 13 | 20 | 4 | 99 | 125 |
| Clarkson | 22 | 9 | 10 | 3 | 2 | 0 | 1 | 29 | 65 | 65 | 38 | 18 | 17 | 3 | 111 | 111 |
| Rensselaer | 22 | 8 | 13 | 1 | 0 | 1 | 0 | 26 | 55 | 70 | 35 | 11 | 23 | 1 | 80 | 115 |
| Yale | 22 | 7 | 14 | 1 | 2 | 2 | 0 | 22 | 63 | 80 | 31 | 8 | 22 | 1 | 79 | 115 |
| St. Lawrence | 22 | 6 | 15 | 1 | 0 | 0 | 1 | 20 | 59 | 99 | 35 | 7 | 25 | 3 | 85 | 151 |
| Brown | 22 | 4 | 16 | 2 | 0 | 2 | 1 | 17 | 44 | 83 | 31 | 5 | 24 | 2 | 63 | 119 |
Championship: March 21, 2026 † indicates conference regular season champion (Cleary Cup) * indicates conference tournament champion (Whitelaw Cup); Rankings: USCHO.com Top 20 Poll; updated March 22, 2026

== Schedule and results ==
| Date | Time | Opponent^{#} | Rank^{#} | Site | TV | Decision | Result | Attendance | Record |
Regular Season
| October 3 | 7:00 pm | at Canisius* | | LECOM Harborcenter • Buffalo, New York | FloHockey | Soderwall | L 1–3 | 1,060 | 0–1–0 |
| October 9 | 7:00 pm | at #4 Penn State* | | Pegula Ice Arena • University Park, Pennsylvania | BTN | Soderwall | W 6–4 | 6,249 | 1–1–0 |
| October 10 | 7:00 pm | at #4 Penn State* | | Pegula Ice Arena • University Park, Pennsylvania | BTN+ | Soderwall | L 2–5 | 6,441 | 1–2–0 |
| October 18 | 7:05 pm | at RIT* | | Blue Cross Arena • Rochester, New York | FloHockey | Rancier | L 2–6 | 10,556 | 1–3–0 |
| October 24 | 7:00 pm | at #8 North Dakota* | | Cheel Arena • Potsdam, New York | ESPN+, SNY | Soderwall | W 5–2 | 2,107 | 2–3–0 |
| October 25 | 7:00 pm | #8 North Dakota* | | Cheel Arena • Potsdam, New York | ESPN+ | Soderwall | L 0–1 | 2,435 | 2–4–0 |
| October 31 | 7:00 pm | Michigan Tech* | | Cheel Arena • Potsdam, New York | ESPN+ | Soderwall | W 6–4 | 2,532 | 3–4–0 |
| November 1 | 7:00 pm | Lake Superior State* | | Cheel Arena • Potsdam, New York | ESPN+ | Soderwall | L 2–6 | 2,848 | 3–5–0 |
| November 7 | 7:00 pm | at Union | | M&T Bank Center • Schenectady, New York | ESPN+ | Soderwall | W 5–1 | 2,399 | 4–5–0 (1–0–0) |
| November 8 | 7:00 pm | at Rensselaer | | Houston Field House • Troy, New York (Rivalry) | ESPN+ | Rancier | L 1–5 | 2,269 | 4–6–0 (1–1–0) |
| November 14 | 7:00 pm | Harvard | | Cheel Arena • Potsdam, New York | ESPN+ | Soderwall | L 1–2 | 2,974 | 4–7–0 (1–2–0) |
| November 15 | 7:00 pm | #19 Dartmouth | | Cheel Arena • Potsdam, New York | ESPN+ | Soderwall | L 1–3 | 2,489 | 4–8–0 (1–3–0) |
| November 21 | 7:00 pm | at #9 Quinnipiac | | M&T Bank Arena • Hamden, Connecticut | ESPN+ | Soderwall | L 1–4 | 2,562 | 4–9–0 (1–4–0) |
| November 22 | 7:00 pm | at Princeton | | Hobey Baker Memorial Rink • Princeton, New Jersey | ESPN+ | Soderwall | L 3–4 | 1,738 | 4–10–0 (1–5–0) |
Adirondack Winter Invitational
| November 28 | 7:30 pm | vs. Massachusetts Lowell* | | Herb Brooks Arena • Lake Placid, New York (Adirondack Game 1) | ESPN+ | Soderwall | W 2–0 | 1,226 | 5–10–0 |
| November 29 | 7:30 pm | vs. Alaska* | | Herb Brooks Arena • Lake Placid, New York (Adirondack Game 2) | ESPN+ | Soderwall | L 2–3 | 1,598 | 5–11–0 |
| December 5 | 7:00 pm | #17 Cornell | | Cheel Arena • Potsdam, New York | ESPN+, SNY | Soderwall | W 4–1 | 2,285 | 6–11–0 (2–5–0) |
| December 6 | 7:00 pm | Colgate | | Cheel Arena • Potsdam, New York | ESPN+ | Soderwall | W 5–3 | 2,643 | 7–11–0 (3–5–0) |
| December 13 | 2:00 pm | USNTDP* | | Cheel Arena • Potsdam, New York (Exhibition) | ESPN+ | Avakyan | W 8–2 | | |
| December 29 | 6:00 pm | RIT* | | Cheel Arena • Potsdam, New York | ESPN+ | Soderwall | W 3–2 | 2,246 | 8–11–0 |
| January 3 | 6:00 pm | at Niagara* | | Dwyer Arena • Lewiston, New York | FloHockey | Soderwall | W 6–2 | 773 | 9–11–0 |
| January 9 | 7:00 pm | at Brown | | Meehan Auditorium • Providence, Rhode Island | ESPN+ | Soderwall | W 3–2 | 525 | 10–11–0 (4–5–0) |
| January 10 | 7:00 pm | at Yale | | Ingalls Rink • New Haven, Connecticut | ESPN+ | Soderwall | W 3–2 | 1,621 | 11–11–0 (5–5–0) |
| January 16 | 7:00 pm | at #10 Dartmouth | | Thompson Arena • Hanover, New Hampshire | ESPN+ | Soderwall | T 2–2 ^{SOL} | 2,204 | 11–11–1 (5–5–1) |
| January 17 | 7:00 pm | at Harvard | | Bright-Landry Hockey Center • Boston, Massachusetts | ESPN+ | Soderwall | L 1–2 | 2,296 | 11–12–1 (5–6–1) |
| January 23 | 7:00 pm | St. Lawrence | | Cheel Arena • Potsdam, New York (Rivalry) | ESPN+ | Soderwall | T 5–5 ^{SOL} | 3,226 | 11–12–2 (5–6–2) |
| January 24 | 7:00 pm | at St. Lawrence | | Appleton Arena • Canton, New York (Rivalry) | ESPN+ | Soderwall | L 2–5 | 2,147 | 11–13–2 (5–7–2) |
| January 30 | 7:00 pm | Princeton | | Cheel Arena • Potsdam, New York | ESPN+ | Soderwall | L 1–3 | 2,321 | 11–14–2 (5–8–2) |
| January 31 | 7:00 pm | #6 Quinnipiac | | Cheel Arena • Potsdam, New York | ESPN+ | Soderwall | T 3–3 ^{SOW} | 2,556 | 11–14–3 (5–8–3) |
| February 6 | 7:00 pm | Rensselaer | | Cheel Arena • Potsdam, New York (Rivalry) | ESPN+ | Rancier | L 3–4 | 1,567 | 11–15–3 (5–9–3) |
| February 7 | 7:00 pm | Union | | Cheel Arena • Potsdam, New York | ESPN+ | Rancier | W 8–7 ^{OT} | 2,524 | 12–15–3 (6–9–3) |
| February 20 | 7:00 pm | Yale | | Cheel Arena • Potsdam, New York | ESPN+ | Soderwall | W 4–1 | 1,956 | 13–15–3 (7–9–3) |
| February 21 | 4:00 pm | Brown | | Cheel Arena • Potsdam, New York | ESPN+ | Soderwall | W 4–3 ^{OT} | 2,467 | 14–15–3 (8–9–3) |
| February 27 | 7:00 pm | at Colgate | | Class of 1965 Arena • Hamilton, New York | ESPN+ | Soderwall | W 4–1 | 700 | 15–15–3 (9–9–3) |
| February 28 | 7:00 pm | at #11 Cornell | | Lynah Rink • Ithaca, New York | ESPN+ | Soderwall | L 1–2 | 4,267 | 15–16–3 (9–10–3) |
ECAC Hockey Tournament
| March 6 | 7:00 pm | at Rensselaer* | | Cheel Arena • Potsdam, New York (ECAC First Round, Rivalry) | ESPN+ | Soderwall | W 2–1 | 2,730 | 16–16–3 |
| March 13 | 7:00 pm | at #7 Quinnipiac* | | M&T Bank Arena • Hamden, Connecticut (ECAC Quarterfinal Game 1) | ESPN+ | Soderwall | W 3–0 | 2,268 | 17–16–3 |
| March 14 | 4:00 pm | at #7 Quinnipiac* | | M&T Bank Arena • Hamden, Connecticut (ECAC Quarterfinal Game 2) | ESPN+ | Soderwall | W 4–3 | 2,441 | 18–16–3 |
| March 20 | 4:00 pm | vs. #9 Dartmouth* | | Herb Brooks Arena • Lake Placid, New York (ECAC Semifinal) | ESPN+ | Soderwall | L 0–4 | 5,164 | 18–17–3 |
*Non-conference game. ^{#}Rankings from USCHO.com Poll. All times are in Eastern Time. Source:

== Rankings ==
| Poll | Week | | | | | | | | | | | | | | | | | | | | | | | | | | | |
| Poll | Pre | 1 | 2 | 3 | 4 | 5 | 6 | 7 | 8 | 9 | 10 | 11 | 12 | 13 | 14 | 15 | 16 | 17 | 18 | 19 | 20 | 21 | 22 | 23 | 24 | 25 | 26 | 27 (Final) |
|---|---|---|---|---|---|---|---|---|---|---|---|---|---|---|---|---|---|---|---|---|---|---|---|---|---|---|---|---|
| USCHO.com | RV | RV | RV | RV | RV | NR | NR | NR | NR | NR | NR | NR | – | NR | NR | NR | NR | NR | NR | NR | NR | NR | NR | NR | RV | | | |
| USA Hockey | 20т | RV | RV | RV | RV | NR | NR | NR | NR | NR | NR | NR | – | NR | NR | RV | NR | NR | NR | NR | NR | NR | NR | NR | RV | | | |

Note: USCHO did not release a poll in week 12.
Note: USA Hockey did not release a poll in week 12.
