= 2025–26 Army Black Knights men's ice hockey season =

- Conference: 9th AHA
- Home ice: Tate Rink

Rankings
- USCHO: NR
- USA Hockey: NR

Record
- Overall: 12–17–6
- Conference: 7–15–4
- Home: 6–10–0
- Road: 6–7–6

Coaches and captains
- Head coach: Zach McKelvie
- Assistant coaches: Jack Riley; Taylor Ward; Brian Gibbons; Riley McVeigh
- Captain: Barron Woodring
- Alternate captain(s): Nik Hong; Sean Vlasich; Easton Zueger

The 2025–26 Army Black Knights men's ice hockey season was the 123rd season of play for the program, the 116th at the Division I level, and the second in Atlantic Hockey America. The Black Knights represented the United States Military Academy in the 2025–26 NCAA Division I men's ice hockey season, played their home games at the Tate Rink and were coached by Zach McKelvie in his first season.

== Season ==
With the departure of their All-American defenseman, Mac Gadowsky, Army's first task was to try and find a way to replace his offensive contributions. While the Knights were one of the nation's most stable lineups, only losing one player outside of graduation, Army's ability to recruit is always limited due to the requirements of military service. While the team was able to put together a modest offense, the Knights were unable to overcome a poor November from their starting goaltender, J. J. Cataldo. The nine-game winless streak put Army behind the eight ball, particularly in the conference standings. A rare appearance in goal by Jacob Biron coincided with the end of the skid and when Cataldo got back into the cage two games later, his performance improved mightily.

Army posted a winning record after Thanksgiving with the bulk half of their season dominated by outstanding play in goal. Nine times, shutouts were recorded in Black Knights games (4 for and 5 against) with the final two happening in the same game. The even play resulted in Army treading water throughout the latter portion of the regular season and, though they came close to earning a postseason home game, they were unable to overcome their poor start.

The conference postseason began with Army travelling to face Niagara. The Knights found themselves down by three goals after one period but used the second to fight back. With the game tied after 40 minutes, Army took a lead midway through the third. With momentum seemingly on their side, the Knights were stunned 14 seconds later when the Purple Eagles knotted the score at four-all. A subsequent power play goal by Niagara proved too much for the Knights to overcome and their season was over.

== Departures ==
Player	Position	Nationality	Cause
Joey Baez	Forward	United States	Graduation (retired)
Josh Bohlin	Forward	United States	Graduation (retired)
Mac Gadowsky	Defenseman	United States	Transferred to Penn State
Andrew Garby	Defenseman	United States	Graduation (retired)
Andrew Gilbert	Defenseman	United States	Graduation (retired)
Hunter McCoy	Forward	United States	Graduation (retired)
Michael Sacco	Forward	United States	Graduation (retired)
Evan Szary	Goaltender	United States	Graduation (retired)

== Recruiting ==
Player	Position	Nationality	Age	Notes
Billy Batten	Forward	United States	21	Phoenixville, PA
Liam Chapman	Defenseman	United States	21	Weare, NH
Kareem El-Bashir	Forward	United States	21	Reston, VA
Brock Jones	Forward	United States	20	Lake View, NY
Jacob Ligi	Forward	United States	21	South Lyon, MI
Lukas McCloskey	Defenseman	United States	20	Newport Beach, CA

== Roster ==
As of July 31, 2025

No.	Nat.	Player	Class	Pos	Height	Weight	DoB	Hometown	Previous team	NHL rights
1	(United States)	Jacob Biron	Sophomore	G	6' 3" (1.91 m)	174 lb (79 kg)	2004-06-26	Buffalo, New York	Kemptville 73's (CCHL)	—
2	(United States)	Lukas McCloskey	Freshman	D	6' 3" (1.91 m)	205 lb (93 kg)	2005-03-25	Newport Beach, California	Wenatchee Wild (WHL)	—
3	(United States)	Easton Zueger (A)	Junior	D	5' 8" (1.73 m)	190 lb (86 kg)	2003-06-07	Sioux Falls, South Dakota	Sioux City Musketeers (USHL)	—
4	(United States)	Benjamin Ivey	Sophomore	F	6' 4" (1.93 m)	220 lb (100 kg)	2004-02-12	San Diego, California	Amarillo Wranglers (NAHL)	—
5	(United States)	Jack Ivey	Sophomore	F	6' 3" (1.91 m)	192 lb (87 kg)	2004-02-12	San Diego, California	Amarillo Wranglers (NAHL)	—
6	(United States)	Pierce Patterson	Junior	D	5' 9" (1.75 m)	165 lb (75 kg)	2002-02-26	Valrico, Florida	Amarillo Wranglers (NAHL)	—
7	(United States)	Liam Chapman	Freshman	D	6' 1" (1.85 m)	187 lb (85 kg)	2004-03-11	Weare, New Hampshire	Rochester Jr. Americans (NAHL)	—
8	(United States)	Vincent Salice	Junior	F	5' 7" (1.7 m)	175 lb (79 kg)	2003-02-28	Commerce Township, Michigan	Omaha Lancers (USHL)	—
9	(United States)	Nils Forselius	Sophomore	F	5' 9" (1.75 m)	170 lb (77 kg)	2003-10-30	Guilford, Connecticut	Maine Nordiques (NAHL)	—
10	(United States)	Dylan Wegner	Sophomore	F	6' 2" (1.88 m)	174 lb (79 kg)	2004-06-01	Nashville, Tennessee	Merritt Centennials (BCHL)	—
11	(United States)	Brock Jones	Freshman	F	5' 11" (1.8 m)	183 lb (83 kg)	2004-11-15	Lake View, New York	Philadelphia Rebels (NAHL)	—
12	(United States)	Sam Groebner	Sophomore	F	6' 3" (1.91 m)	201 lb (91 kg)	2003-03-03	Apple Valley, Minnesota	Wisconsin Windigo (NAHL)	—
13	(United States)	Jacob Ligi	Freshman	F	5' 10" (1.78 m)	176 lb (80 kg)	2004-03-16	South Lyon, Michigan	Chippewa Steel (NAHL)	—
14	(United States)	Owen Nolan	Senior	D	6' 0" (1.83 m)	185 lb (84 kg)	2000-03-10	Mahopac, New York	Lone Star Brahmas (NAHL)	—
15	(United States)	Lucas Kanta	Senior	F	6' 2" (1.88 m)	195 lb (88 kg)	2001-04-20	Grand Forks, North Dakota	Minnesota Magicians (NAHL)	—
16	(United States)	Kareem El-Bashir	Freshman	F	5' 10" (1.78 m)	176 lb (80 kg)	2004-03-02	Reston, Virginia	Maryland Black Bears (NAHL)	—
17	(United States)	Noah Alvarez	Sophomore	F	5' 11" (1.8 m)	185 lb (84 kg)	2003-03-30	Los Angeles, California	Nanaimo Clippers (NAHL)	—
18	(United States)	Jon Bell	Junior	D	5' 10" (1.78 m)	205 lb (93 kg)	2002-06-22	St. Cloud, Minnesota	Wisconsin Windigo (NAHL)	—
19	(United States)	Nik Hong (A)	Junior	F	5' 11" (1.8 m)	185 lb (84 kg)	2002-08-27	Minneapolis, Minnesota	St. Cloud Norsemen (NAHL)	—
20	(United States)	Sean Vlasich (A)	Senior	D	5' 9" (1.75 m)	175 lb (79 kg)	2001-04-20	Hillsdale, New Jersey	North Iowa Bulls (NAHL)	—
21	(United States)	Stephen Willey	Senior	F	6' 1" (1.85 m)	195 lb (88 kg)	2001-03-26	Shelton, Connecticut	New Jersey Titans (NAHL)	—
22	(United States)	Jude Brower	Senior	D	6' 1" (1.85 m)	180 lb (82 kg)	2001-06-11	Mahopac, New York	Boston Junior Bruins (NCDC)	—
23	(United States)	Joey Baez	Senior	F	5' 9" (1.75 m)	175 lb (79 kg)	2000-01-12	Tampa, Florida	Lone Star Brahmas (NAHL)	—
24	(United States)	Billy Batten	Freshman	F	5' 9" (1.75 m)	174 lb (79 kg)	2004-09-24	Phoenixville, Pennsylvania	Minot Minotauros (NAHL)	—
25	(United States)	Barron Woodring (C)	Junior	F	6' 2" (1.88 m)	200 lb (91 kg)	2002-07-05	Chicago, Illinois	Rockets Hockey Club (NCDC)	—
26	(United States)	Joey Dosan	Senior	F	6' 6" (1.98 m)	220 lb (100 kg)	2001-03-20	Bloomington, Minnesota	Springfield Jr. Blues (NAHL)	—
27	(United States)	Trevor Smith	Senior	F	5' 9" (1.75 m)	185 lb (84 kg)	2001-03-02	Raleigh, North Carolina	Boston Advantage (NCDC)	—
28	(United States)	Brent Keefer	Junior	F	6' 0" (1.83 m)	170 lb (77 kg)	2001-09-28	Colorado Springs, Colorado	Northeast Generals (NAHL)	—
29	(United States)	Adam Marshall	Sophomore	F	5' 10" (1.78 m)	181 lb (82 kg)	2003-07-14	Wayzata, Minnesota	Trail Smoke Eaters (NAHL)	—
30	(United States)	J. J. Cataldo	Sophomore	G	6' 0" (1.83 m)	170 lb (77 kg)	2003-02-20	Stuart, Florida	Springfield Jr. Blues (NAHL)	—
33	(United States)	Gus Holt	Junior	G	6' 3" (1.91 m)	206 lb (93 kg)	2003-02-21	Bowling Green, Ohio	Victoria Grizzlies (BCHL)	—

== Standings ==
2025–26 Atlantic Hockey America Standings
	Conference record										Overall record					
	GP	W	L	T	OW	OL	SW	PTS	GF	GA	GP	W	L	T	GF	GA
#20 Bentley †*	26	16	6	4	1	0	2	53	85	56	40	23	12	5	122	94
Sacred Heart	26	15	8	3	1	0	1	48	80	61	40	23	14	3	118	96
Robert Morris	26	13	11	2	0	2	2	45	69	69	40	16	21	3	103	128
Holy Cross	26	14	10	2	1	1	1	45	81	69	38	18	18	2	113	116
RIT	26	13	11	2	2	1	2	42	69	68	36	17	17	2	93	96
Air Force	26	13	10	3	2	1	0	41	75	73	37	18	15	4	108	112
Canisius	26	12	12	2	1	0	2	39	81	74	35	17	16	2	107	105
Niagara	26	9	16	1	1	3	0	30	67	83	37	13	23	1	93	118
Army	26	7	15	4	2	3	2	28	61	75	35	12	17	6	91	96
Mercyhurst	26	5	18	3	0	0	1	19	47	87	37	6	28	3	65	143
Championship: March 21, 2026 † indicates conference regular season champion (DeGregorio Trophy) * indicates conference tournament champion (Riley Trophy); Rankings: USCHO.com Top 20 Poll; updated April 15, 2026; Source: AHA

== Schedule and results ==
Date	Time	Opponent^{#}	Rank^{#}	Site	TV	Decision	Result	Attendance	Record
Exhibition
October 3	5:00 p.m.	Long Island*		Tate Rink • West Point, New York (Exhibition)	FloHockey	Cataldo	L 0–3	1,573	
Regular season
October 4	5:00 p.m.	at Union*		M&T Bank Center • Schenectady, New York	ESPN+	Cataldo	T 1–1	2,241	0–0–1
October 10	7:00 p.m.	at Northeastern*		Matthews Arena • Boston, Massachusetts	ESPN+	Cataldo	W 2–1	3,198	1–0–1
October 12	4:00 p.m.	Stonehill*		Tate Rink • West Point, New York	FloHockey	Cataldo	W 6–1	1,899	2–0–1
October 14	7:00 p.m.	Canisius		Tate Rink • West Point, New York	FloHockey	Cataldo	L 1–3	1,038	2–1–1 (0–1–0)
October 24	7:00 p.m.	Holy Cross		Tate Rink • West Point, New York	FloHockey	Cataldo	W 5–2	1,257	3–1–1 (1–1–0)
October 25	5:00 p.m.	Holy Cross		Tate Rink • West Point, New York	FloHockey	Cataldo	L 1–5	1,597	3–2–1 (1–2–0)
November 1	7:00 p.m.	at Canisius		LECOM Harborcenter • Buffalo, New York	FloHockey	Cataldo	T 2–2 ^{SOL}	877	3–2–2 (1–2–1)
November 7	7:00 p.m.	at Bentley		Bentley Arena • Waltham, Massachusetts	FloHockey	Cataldo	T 3–3 ^{SOW}	1,700	3–2–3 (1–2–2)
November 9	2:00 p.m.	Bentley		Tate Rink • West Point, New York	FloHockey	Cataldo	L 2–3	2,086	3–3–3 (1–3–2)
November 14	6:00 p.m.	at Niagara		Dwyer Arena • Lewiston, New York	FloHockey	Cataldo	L 4–6	863	3–4–3 (1–4–2)
November 15	5:00 p.m.	at Niagara		Dwyer Arena • Lewiston, New York	FloHockey	Biron	L 1–4	657	3–5–3 (1–5–2)
November 21	7:00 p.m.	Air Force		Tate Rink • West Point, New York (Rivalry)	FloHockey	Cataldo	L 3–6	2,432	3–6–3 (1–6–2)
November 23	4:00 p.m.	Air Force		Tate Rink • West Point, New York (Rivalry)	FloHockey	Cataldo	L 2–3 ^{OT}	2,088	3–7–3 (1–7–2)
November 25	7:00 p.m.	Bentley		Tate Rink • West Point, New York	FloHockey	Cataldo	L 1–3	1,346	3–8–3 (1–8–2)
November 29	4:00 p.m.	#18 Massachusetts*		Tate Rink • West Point, New York	FloHockey	Biron	W 5–4	1,858	4–8–3
December 5	7:00 p.m.	at Sacred Heart		Martire Family Arena • Fairfield, Connecticut	FloHockey	Biron	T 3–3 ^{SOL}	2,360	4–8–4 (1–8–3)
December 6	5:00 p.m.	at Sacred Heart		Martire Family Arena • Fairfield, Connecticut	FloHockey	Cataldo	W 2–0	2,588	5–8–4 (2–8–3)
December 12	7:00 p.m.	at #8 Dartmouth*		Thompson Arena • Hanover, New Hampshire	ESPN+	Cataldo	L 0–3	2,539	5–9–4
December 13	6:00 p.m.	at Vermont*		Gutterson Fieldhouse • Burlington, Vermont	ESPN+	Cataldo	W 3–0	2,103	6–9–4
December 28	5:00 p.m.	at Long Island*		Northwell Health Ice Center • East Meadow, New York	FloHockey	Cataldo	T 4–4 ^{OT}	600	6–9–5
January 2	7:00 p.m.	#12 Northeastern*		Tate Rink • West Point, New York	FloHockey	Cataldo	W 5–2	2,588	7–9–5
January 9	7:00 p.m.	at Mercyhurst		Mercyhurst Ice Center • Erie, Pennsylvania	FloHockey	Cataldo	L 0–3	897	7–10–5 (2–9–3)
January 10	5:00 p.m.	at Mercyhurst		Mercyhurst Ice Center • Erie, Pennsylvania	FloHockey	Cataldo	W 5–0	706	8–10–5 (3–9–3)
January 16	7:00 p.m.	Robert Morris		Tate Rink • West Point, New York	FloHockey	Cataldo	W 3–2 ^{OT}	2,288	9–10–5 (4–9–3)
January 17	4:00 p.m.	Robert Morris		Tate Rink • West Point, New York	FloHockey	Cataldo	L 0–3	2,243	9–11–5 (4–10–3)
January 24	7:00 p.m.	Royal Military College		Tate Rink • West Point, New York Rivalry, Exhibition	FloHockey	Cancelled due to weather conditions			
January 29	7:00 p.m.	at Holy Cross		Hart Center • Worcester, Massachusetts	FloHockey	Cataldo	W 3–2 ^{OT}	807	10–11–5 (5–10–3)
January 30	7:00 p.m.	at Holy Cross		Hart Center • Worcester, Massachusetts	FloHockey	Cataldo	L 0–3	1,175	10–12–5 (5–11–3)
February 6	7:00 p.m.	RIT		Tate Rink • West Point, New York	FloHockey	Cataldo	W 6–2	1,834	11–12–5 (6–11–3)
February 7	4:00 p.m.	RIT		Tate Rink • West Point, New York	FloHockey	Cataldo	L 2–3 ^{OT}	2,508	11–13–5 (6–12–3)
February 10	7:00 p.m.	at Bentley		Bentley Arena • Waltham, Massachusetts	FloHockey	Cataldo	L 3–4 ^{OT}	1,157	11–14–5 (6–13–3)
February 20	9:00 p.m.	at Air Force		Cadet Ice Arena • Air Force Academy, Colorado (Rivalry)	FloHockey	Cataldo	W 4–3	2,820	12–14–5 (7–13–3)
February 21	7:00 p.m.	at Air Force		Cadet Ice Arena • Air Force Academy, Colorado (Rivalry)	FloHockey	Cataldo	T 0–0 ^{SOW}	2,809	12–14–6 (7–13–4)
February 27	7:00 p.m.	Sacred Heart		Tate Rink • West Point, New York	FloHockey	Cataldo	L 2–3	1,893	12–15–6 (7–14–4)
February 28	4:00 p.m.	Sacred Heart		Tate Rink • West Point, New York	FloHockey	Cataldo	L 3–4	2,586	12–16–6 (7–15–4)
Atlantic Hockey America tournament
March 3	7:00 p.m.	at Niagara*		Dwyer Arena • Lewiston, New York (AHA First Round)	FloHockey	Cataldo	L 4–5	323	12–17–6
*Non-conference game. ^{#}Rankings from USCHO.com Poll. All times are in Eastern Time. Source:

== Scoring statistics ==
Name	Position	Games	Goals	Assists	Points	PIM
Jack Ivey	F	35	14	14	28	2
Nils Forselius	F	32	5	21	26	20
Ben Ivey	F	31	13	11	24	4
Barron Woodring	C	35	7	17	24	14
Nik Hong	F	35	11	10	21	31
Adam Marshall	LW	35	7	9	16	26
Brent Keefer	F	35	6	9	15	29
Jude Brower	D	34	5	10	15	26
Billy Batten	F	35	4	10	14	10
Vincent Salice	C	35	7	2	9	20
Lukas McCloskey	C	27	2	5	7	24
Owen Nolan	D	35	2	5	7	39
Samuel Groebner	D	35	0	7	7	29
Easton Zueger	D	30	1	5	6	41
Pierce Patterson	D	17	0	5	5	4
Liam Chapman	D	20	1	3	4	6
Sean Vlasich	D	33	1	3	4	26
Stephen Willey	LW	14	2	0	2	6
Dylan Wegner	F	20	2	0	2	2
Brock Jones	LW	26	1	1	2	10
Lucas Kanta	LW	24	0	1	1	16
J. J. Cataldo	G	32	0	1	1	4
Noah Alvarez	F	2	0	0	0	0
Joey Dosan	F	2	0	0	0	0
Jacob Biron	G	4	0	0	0	0
Jon Bell	D	11	0	0	0	2
Trevor Smith	C	13	0	0	0	2
Jacob Ligi	C	14	0	0	0	6
Total			91	149	240	401

== Goaltending statistics ==
Name	Games	Minutes	Wins	Losses	Ties	Goals against	Saves	Shut outs	SV %	GAA
J. J. Cataldo	32	1914:46	11	16	5	79	917	4	.921	2.48
Jacob Biron	5	207:33	1	1	1	10	114	0	.919	2.89
Empty Net	-	22:48	-	-	-	7	-	-	-	-
Total	35	2144:31	12	17	6	96	1031	4	.909	2.69

== Rankings ==
Ranking movements Legend: — = Not ranked
	Week																											
Poll	Pre	1	2	3	4	5	6	7	8	9	10	11	12	13	14	15	16	17	18	19	20	21	22	23	24	25	26	Final
USCHO.com	—	—	—	—	—	—	—	—	—	—	—	—	*	—	—	—	—	—	—	—	—	—	—	—	—	—	—	—
USA Hockey	—	—	—	—	—	—	—	—	—	—	—	—	*	—	—	—	—	—	—	—	—	—	—	—	—	—	—	—

Note: USCHO did not relaease a week 12 poll
Note: USA Hockey did not relaease a week 12 poll
