= 2026–27 NAHL season =

American junior ice hockey season

- League: North American Hockey League
- Sport: Ice hockey
- Duration: Regular season September 11, 2026 – April 17, 2027; Postseason; April – May 2027
- Games: 59
- Teams: 34

Draft
- Top draft pick: Vital Dinis
- Picked by: Pueblo Peppers

Regular season

NAHL seasons
- ← 2025–26

The 2026-27 North American Hockey League season is the league's 42nd season under this name and its 52nd dating back to its founding as the Great Lakes Junior Hockey League in 1975 when the Michigan Junior Hockey League and the Wolverine Junior A Hockey League merged.

== Membership changes ==
- In early December 2024 reports of the league adding six teams that would form a Pacific Division would indicate that the league would likely be adding four teams in California and one each in Arizona and Nevada likely for the 2026–27 season. Previous rumors had indicated a stand alone Tier-I league, while others had teams affiliated with the United States Hockey League, Western Hockey League, and the British Columbia Hockey League had also been indicated over the past two years. The planned organizations have reportedly had ties to the region's National Hockey League teams and former players. The teams would end up added to the USHL for the 2027–28 season.
- On or around May 22, 2025 it was announced that the Greeley, Colorado based Colorado Grit had its' lease terminated at the Greeley Ice Haus and that the team would go inactive for the 2025–26 season with the intent of returning for the 2026–27 season. The city had terminated the lease citing unpaid bills and other issues with local businesses. The team using the threat of legal action citing not completed financial commitments with the team. The team would not return to the league for the 2026–27 season.
- On March 18, 2026 the NAHL announce the relocation of the North Iowa Bulls to the newly opened Deep South Ice & Sports Center in Richmond, Texas, a suburb of Houston, Texas for the 2026–27 season. The team will be renamed the Houston Bulls.
- In late May 2026 it was indicated that the Maine Nordiques (NAHL) and Maine Nordiques (NA3HL) had both folded.
- On June 2, 2026 the Billings Cattle Punchers, who were announced as an expansion team in the National Collegiate Development Conference for 2026-27 were reported to be jumping to the North American Hockey League. Also included were the Pueblo Bulls, who were reportedly taking over the charter of the Chippewa Steel franchise. The Utah Outliers and Ogden Mustangs were also reported to be joining the NAHL. The Rochester Jr. Americans were also reported to be going dormant for the 2026–27 season. When the league issued its release about the creation of a Mountain Division for the 2026–27 season, the release also included the Idaho Falls Spud Kings and Grand Junction River Hawks, but not the Utah Outliers.
- On July 3, 2026 the Pueblo Bulls announced that would be rebranded as the Pueblo Peppers. The team had purchased the Chippewa Steel franchise rights and relocated it to Pueblo, Colorado.

== Teams ==
Central Division
Team	Arena	Location
Aberdeen Wings	Odde Ice Center	Aberdeen, South Dakota
Austin Bruins	Riverside Arena	Austin, Minnesota
Bismarck Bobcats	V.F.W. Sports Center	Bismarck, North Dakota
Minot Minotauros	Maysa Arena	Minot, North Dakota
St. Cloud Norsemen	Dave Torrey Arena	St. Cloud, Minnesota
Watertown Shamrocks	Prairie Lakes Ice Arena	Watertown, South Dakota
Midwest Division
Team	Arena	Location
Anchorage Wolverines	Sullivan Arena	Anchorage, Alaska
Chippewa Steel	Chippewa Area Ice Arena	Chippewa Falls, Wisconsin
Fairbanks Ice Dogs	Big Dipper Ice Arena	Fairbanks, Alaska
Janesville Jets	Woodman's Center	Janesville, Wisconsin
Kenai River Brown Bears	Soldotna Sports Center	Soldotna, Alaska
Minnesota Mallards	Forest Lake Sports Center	Forest Lake, Minnesota
Minnesota Wilderness	Northwoods Credit Union Arena	Cloquet, Minnesota
Springfield Jr. Blues	Nelson Center	Springfield, Illinois
Wisconsin Windigo	The Ponds of Brookfield	Brookfield, Wisconsin
East Division
Team	Arena	Location
Danbury Jr. Hat Tricks	Danbury Ice Arena	Danbury, Connecticut
Elmira Aviators	First Arena	Elmira, New York
Johnstown Tomahawks	Cambria County War Memorial Arena	Johnstown, Pennsylvania
Maine Nordiques	Norway Savings Bank Arena	Auburn, Maine
Maryland Black Bears	Piney Orchard Ice Arena/Ice World	Odenton, Maryland/Abingdon, Maryland
New Hampshire Jr. Mountain Kings	Delta Dental Arena	Hooksett, New Hampshire
New Jersey Junior Titans	Middletown Ice World Arena	Middletown, New Jersey
Northeast Generals	Canton Ice House	Canton, Massachusetts
Philadelphia Rebels	Hollydell Ice Arena	Sewell, New Jersey
Rochester Jr. Americans	Thomas Creek Ice Arena	Fairport, New York
South Division
Team	Arena	Location
Amarillo Wranglers	Amarillo Ice Ranch	Amarillo, Texas
Corpus Christi IceRays	American Bank Center	Corpus Christi, Texas
El Paso Rhinos	Sierra Providence Event Center	El Paso, Texas
Houston Bulls	Deep South Ice & Sports Center	Richmond, Texas
Lone Star Brahmas	NYTEX Sports Centre	North Richland Hills, Texas
New Mexico Ice Wolves	Outpost Ice Arenas	Albuquerque, New Mexico
Odessa Jackalopes	Ector County Coliseum	Odessa, Texas
Oklahoma Warriors	Blazers Ice Centre	Oklahoma City, Oklahoma
Shreveport Mudbugs	Hirsch Coliseum	Shreveport, Louisiana
South Division
Team	Arena	Location
Billings Cattle Punchers	Signal Peak Energy Arena	Billings, Montana
Grand Junction River Hawks	River City Sportplex	Grand Junction, Colorado
Idaho Falls Spud Kings	Hero Arena at the Mountain America Center	Idaho Falls, Idaho
Ogden Mustangs	The Ice Sheet at Ogden	Ogden, Utah
Pueblo Peppers	Pueblo Ice Arena	Pueblo, Colorado

== Standings ==
To be added upon completion of the regular season.

== Robertson Cup playoffs ==
=== Format ===
The third place team plays the sixth place team and the fourth place team plays the fifth place team in best-of-three division quarterfinal series in the East and South Division, with the winners being re-seeded third and fourth. In the other divisions the top four teams in each division qualify for the playoffs. The first place team plays the fourth place team and the second place team plays the third place team in a best-of-five series over two weekends. The division semifinal winners meet in a best-of-five series over two weekends. The division winners advance to the Robertson Cup tournament. The event will be held at the Fogerty Arena in Blaine, Minnesota from May 21 to May 25, 2027. The teams are seeded 1 to 4 and are paired off 1 vs 4 and 2 vs 3 in best-of-three series. The semifinal winners meet in a single championship game on May 25.
