= 2025–26 NAHL season =

- League: North American Hockey League
- Sport: Ice hockey
- Duration: Regular season September 12, 2025 – April 11, 2026; Postseason; April 11 – May 19, 2026
- Games: 59
- Teams: 34

Draft
- Top draft pick: Jonathan Doucette
- Picked by: Aberdeen Wings

Regular season
- Season champions: Maryland Black Bears
- Season MVP: Harrison Smith (Maryland Black Bears)
- Top scorer: Harrison Smith (Maryland Black Bears)

Robertson Cup Playoffs
- Robertson Cup Playoffs MVP: Harrison Smith (Black Bears)
- Finals champions: Maryland Black Bears
- Runners-up: Minnesota Wilderness

NAHL seasons
- ← 2024–25 2026–27 →

The 2025–26 NAHL season was the 51st season of the North American Hockey League. The regular season ran from September 12, 2025, to April 11, 2026, with a 59-game schedule for each team. The Maryland Black Bears won the regular season championship and went on to defeat the Minnesota Wilderness 3–2 in overtime in the Championship game to capture their first Robertson Cup title.

== Membership changes ==
- In early December 2024 reports of the league adding six teams that would form a Pacific Division would indicate that the league would likely be adding four teams in California and one each in Arizona and Nevada likely for the 2026–27 season. Previous rumors had indicated a stand-alone Tier-I league, while others had teams affiliated with the United States Hockey League, Western Hockey League, and the British Columbia Hockey League had also been indicated over the past two years. The planned organizations have reportedly had ties to the region's National Hockey League teams and former players.
- On May 22, 2025, it was announced that the Wisconsin Windigo had been sold and were being relocated to The Ponds of Brookfield in Brookfield, Wisconsin. No name change was indicated in the announcement.
- Also on or around May 22, 2025 it was announced that the Greeley, Colorado based Colorado Grit had its lease terminated at the Greeley Ice Haus and that the team would go inactive for the 2025–26 season with the intent of returning for the 2026–27 season. The city had terminated the lease citing unpaid bills and other issues with local businesses. The team using the threat of legal action citing not completed financial commitments with the team.
- According to a June 18, 2025 article on television station WGME 13 out of Portland, Maine website the future of the Maine Nordiques (NAHL) as well as the Maine Nordiques (NA3HL) is in question in Lewiston, Maine as The Colisée is up for sale and has been since June 2024. The article stated that the NAHL team did not have a lease for the upcoming 2025–26 season and that there were no other facilities in Lewiston to be able to use for ice hockey. No specific mention of the NA3HL team was made but the same situation is likely for them as well. Both teams would be on their league schedules when they are released June 25 and 26. The arena was sold in early July and on July 8, 2025, the United States Premier Hockey League's NCDC announced the addition of the Lewiston MAINEiacs to the league for the 2025–26 season. On July 15 the new ownership of the arena issued a release stating that they had ending talks with the ownership of the Nordiques teams and stated that it was due to previous unpaid bills and the inability of the ownership of the teams to make good on payment on past due debts involving the rink, its staff and the city. On August 21 the team announced that it would be playing out of the Norway Savings Bank Arena in Auburn, Maine.
- The Janesville Jets move into the Woodman's Center which opens in 2025, after having played their whole existence in the Janesville Ice Arena.
- On March 18, 2026, the NAHL announce the relocation of the North Iowa Bulls to the newly opened Deep South Ice & Sports Center in Richmond, Texas, a suburb of Houston, Texas for the 2026–27 season. The team will be renamed the Houston Bulls.
- In late May 2026 it was indicated that the Maine Nordiques (NAHL) and Maine Nordiques (NA3HL) had both folded.
- On June 2, 2026, the Billings Cattle Punchers, who were announced as an expansion team in the National Collegiate Development Conference for 2026-27 were reported to be jumping to the North American Hockey League. Also included were the Pueblo Bulls, who were reportedly taking over the charter of the Chippewa Steel franchise. The Utah Outliers and Ogden Mustangs were also reported to be joining the NAHL. The Rochester Jr. Americans were also reported to be going dormant for the 2026–27 season. When the league issued its release about the creation of a Mountain Division for the 2026–27 season, the release also included the Idaho Falls Spud Kings and Grand Junction River Hawks, but not the Utah Outliers.
- On July 3, 2026, the Pueblo Bulls announced that would be rebranded as the Pueblo Peppers.

== Teams ==
Central Division
Team	Arena	Location
Aberdeen Wings	Odde Ice Center	Aberdeen, South Dakota
Austin Bruins	Riverside Arena	Austin, Minnesota
Bismarck Bobcats	V.F.W. Sports Center	Bismarck, North Dakota
Minnesota Mallards	Forest Lake Sports Center	Forest Lake, Minnesota
Minot Minotauros	Maysa Arena	Minot, North Dakota
North Iowa Bulls	Mason City Arena	Mason City, Iowa
St. Cloud Norsemen	Dave Torrey Arena	St. Cloud, Minnesota
Watertown Shamrocks	Prairie Lakes Ice Arena	Watertown, South Dakota
Midwest Division
Team	Arena	Location
Anchorage Wolverines	Sullivan Arena	Anchorage, Alaska
Chippewa Steel	Chippewa Area Ice Arena	Chippewa Falls, Wisconsin
Fairbanks Ice Dogs	Big Dipper Ice Arena	Fairbanks, Alaska
Janesville Jets	Woodman's Center	Janesville, Wisconsin
Kenai River Brown Bears	Soldotna Sports Center	Soldotna, Alaska
Minnesota Wilderness	Northwoods Credit Union Arena	Cloquet, Minnesota
Springfield Jr. Blues	Nelson Center	Springfield, Illinois
Wisconsin Windigo	The Ponds of Brookfield	Brookfield, Wisconsin
East Division
Team	Arena	Location
Danbury Jr. Hat Tricks	Danbury Ice Arena	Danbury, Connecticut
Elmira Aviators	First Arena	Elmira, New York
Johnstown Tomahawks	Cambria County War Memorial Arena	Johnstown, Pennsylvania
Maine Nordiques	Norway Savings Bank Arena	Auburn, Maine
Maryland Black Bears	Piney Orchard Ice Arena/Ice World	Odenton, Maryland/Abingdon, Maryland
New Hampshire Jr. Mountain Kings	Delta Dental Arena	Hooksett, New Hampshire
New Jersey Junior Titans	Middletown Ice World Arena	Middletown, New Jersey
Northeast Generals	Canton Ice House	Canton, Massachusetts
Philadelphia Rebels	Hollydell Ice Arena	Sewell, New Jersey
Rochester Jr. Americans	Thomas Creek Ice Arena	Fairport, New York
South Division
Team	Arena	Location
Amarillo Wranglers	Amarillo Ice Ranch	Amarillo, Texas
Corpus Christi IceRays	American Bank Center	Corpus Christi, Texas
El Paso Rhinos	Sierra Providence Event Center	El Paso, Texas
Lone Star Brahmas	NYTEX Sports Centre	North Richland Hills, Texas
New Mexico Ice Wolves	Outpost Ice Arenas	Albuquerque, New Mexico
Odessa Jackalopes	Ector County Coliseum	Odessa, Texas
Oklahoma Warriors	Blazers Ice Centre	Oklahoma City, Oklahoma
Shreveport Mudbugs	Hirsch Coliseum	Shreveport, Louisiana

== Standings ==
=== Central Division ===
Team	GP	W	L	OL	SL	GF	GA	Pts
Austin Bruins	59	43	12	2	2	241	131	90
Bismarck Bobcats	59	39	15	3	2	246	165	83
Aberdeen Wings	59	37	16	4	2	225	162	80
Watertown Shamrocks	59	31	23	3	2	195	194	67
North Iowa Bulls	59	27	25	3	4	202	214	61
St. Cloud Norsemen	59	23	30	6	0	155	208	52
Minot Minotauros	59	23	31	3	2	173	221	51
Minnesota Mallards	59	11	42	4	2	147	280	28

=== East Division ===
Team	GP	W	L	OL	SL	GF	GA	Pts
Maryland Black Bears	59	49	6	3	1	248	136	102
Rochester Jr. Americans	59	37	21	1	0	210	159	75
New Jersey Titans	59	32	22	2	3	176	174	69
Northeast Generals	59	31	22	5	1	197	177	68
Maine Nordiques	59	32	23	2	2	172	167	68
Danbury Jr. Hat Tricks	59	27	24	5	3	182	187	62
Johnstown Tomahawks	59	24	26	5	4	178	210	57
New Hampshire Mountain Kings	59	23	27	4	5	165	226	55
Elmira Aviators	59	22	28	5	4	169	221	53
Philadelphia Rebels	59	21	29	3	6	155	186	51

=== Midwest Division ===
Team	GP	W	L	OL	SL	GF	GA	Pts
Minnesota Wilderness	59	42	12	3	2	249	148	89
Fairbanks Ice Dogs	59	35	21	2	1	210	157	73
Wisconsin Windigo	59	34	21	1	3	191	169	72
Anchorage Wolverines	59	32	21	3	3	221	212	70
Springfield Jr. Blues	59	30	24	4	3	175	173	67
Janesville Jets	59	28	30	0	1	184	186	57
Kenai River Brown Bears	59	21	37	1	0	176	239	43
Chippewa Steel	59	11	44	3	1	119	260	26

=== South Division ===
Team	GP	W	L	OL	SL	GF	GA	Pts
Lone Star Brahmas	59	42	12	1	4	199	128	89
New Mexico Ice Wolves	59	35	19	4	1	189	170	75
El Paso Rhinos	59	33	19	2	5	206	166	73
Corpus Christi IceRays	59	30	23	5	1	187	194	66
Shreveport Mudbugs	59	28	22	3	6	171	172	65
Oklahoma Warriors	59	26	26	2	5	195	208	59
Odessa Jackalopes	59	23	29	4	3	178	220	53
Amarillo Wranglers	59	20	35	2	2	147	215	44

=== Statistics ===
==== Scoring leaders ====
The following players led the league in regular season points at the completion of games played on April 11, 2026.

Player	Team	GP	G	A	Pts	PIM
Harrison Smith	Maryland Black Bears	49	24	72	96	47
Siamion Morschyonok	Austin Bruins	57	30	57	87	24
Troy Hunka	El Paso Rhinos	58	28	57	85	28
Luc Bydal	Anchorage Wolverines	58	42	39	81	70
Matsvei Morschyonok	Austin Bruins	59	26	54	80	12
Ryan Shaw	Rochester Jr. Americans	53	38	39	77	95
Tanner Duncan	Maryland Black Bears	54	28	47	75	38
Noah Dziver	Minnesota Wilderness	48	30	45	75	28
Joseph Hyten	Janesville Jets	59	31	41	72	69
E.J. Paddington	Austin Bruins	58	38	34	72	68

==== Leading goaltenders ====
Note: GP = Games played; Mins = Minutes played; W = Wins; L = Losses; OTL = Overtime losses; SOL = Shootout losses; SO = Shutouts; GAA = Goals against average; SV% = Save percentage

Player	Team	GP	Mins	W	L	OTL	SOL	SO	SV%	GAA
Jack Solomon	Austin Bruins	30	1720	24	5	0	0	6	.934	1.85
Leo Gabriel	Lone Star Brahmas	28	1597	20	5	1	2	3	.912	1.92
Michael Modelski	El Paso Rhinos	31	1848	21	6	1	2	2	.939	2.05
Ryan Denes	Maryland Black Bears	33	1909	27	2	2	1	7	.909	2.07
Ryan Gerlich	Minnesota Wilderness	26	1539	19	4	1	2	6	.924	2.11

== Robertson Cup Playoffs ==
=== Format ===
The third place team plays the sixth place team and the fourth place team plays the fifth place team in best-of-three division quarterfinal series in the East and South Division, with the winners being re-seeded third and fourth. In the other divisions the top four teams in each division qualify for the playoffs. The first place team plays the fourth place team and the second place team plays the third place team in a best-of-five series over two weekends. The division semifinal winners meet in a best-of-five series over two weekends. The division winners advance to the Robertson Cup tournament. The event will be held at the Fogerty Arena in Blaine, Minnesota in May 15–19, 2026. The teams are seeded 1 to 4 and are paired off 1 vs 4 and 2 vs 3 in best-of-three series. The semifinal winners meet in a single championship game on May 19.

== Division Play-in ==
=== East Division ===
==== (E3) New Jersey Titans vs. (E6) Danbury Jr. Hat Tricks ====
April 10	New Jersey Titans	0 – 3	Danbury Jr. Hat Tricks	Middletown Ice World Arena
No scornig		First period	Matthew Dabrowski (1) - 15:20
No scornig		Second period	Benjamin Dempster (1) - 11:26
No scornig		Third period	Lukas Zimovcak (1) - 6:49
Andrew Bely (21 saves / 24 shots)		Goalie stats	Jon Dukarič (51 saves / 51 shots)

April 11	New Jersey Titans	1 – 5	Danbury Jr. Hat Tricks	Middletown Ice World Arena
No scoring		First period	Matthew Shpungin (1) - pp - 9:48; Matthew Shpungin (2) - pp - 10:52; Brendan Boring (1) - pp - 16:52
No scoring		Second period	Brendan Boring (2) - sh - 6:23
3:36 - Ryder O'Neil (1)		Third period	Lukas Zimovcak (2) - 4:24
Andrew Bely (7 saves / 10 shots); Landen Bullock Pahua (14 saves / 16 shots)		Goalie stats	Jon Dukarič (37 saves / 38 shots)

Danbury wins series 2 – 0

==== (E4) Northeast Generals vs. (E5) Maine Nordiques ====
April 10	Northeast Generals	4 – 5	Maine Nordiques	Canton Ice House
No scoring		First period	Austin Borggaard (1) - 13:22; Damon Myers (1) - 19:54
4:04 - pp - Logan Poulin (1)		Second period	Pete Luecke (1) - 6:33; William-Francisco Parent (1) - 11:29
0:17 - Logan Poulin (2); 3:38 - pp - Kody Moyer (1); 9:10 - Jack Montaldo (1)		Third period	Damon Myers (2) - 11:47
Will Mizenko (23 saves / 28 shots)		Goalie stats	Lukáš Fürsten (30 saves / 34 shots)

April 11	Northeast Generals	8 – 2	Maine Nordiques	Canton Ice House
4:23 - pp - Alec Hall (1); 9:43 - Richard Rucireto (1); 10:13 - Kody Moyer (2); 12:59 - Richard Rucireto (2)		First period	No scoring
0:43 - Kody Moyer (3); 16:05 - pp - Cole McKenna (1); 17:02 - pp - Beckett Hinchsliff (1); 19:27 - Finn Connor (1)		Second period	Josh Itri (1) - 18:15
No scoring		Third period	Luke Gallo (1) - 5:59
Will Mizenko (23 saves / 25 shots)		Goalie stats	Lukáš Fürsten (3 saves / 7 shots); Matthew Wood (20 saves / 24 shots)

April 12	Northeast Generals	3 – 1	Maine Nordiques	Canton Ice House
Cole McKenna (2) - 5:47		First period	No scoring
No scoring		Second period	No scoring
Spencer Hirsch (1) - 8:57; Logan Poulin (3) - pp - 19:22		Third period	19:42 - Austin Borggaard (2)
Will Mizenko (31 saves / 32 shots)		Goalie stats	Lukáš Fürsten (39 saves / 42 shots)

Northeast wins series 2 – 1

=== South Division ===
==== (S4) Corpus Christi IceRays vs. (S5) Shreveport Mudbugs ====
April 10	Corpus Christi IceRays	2 – 7	Shreveport Mudbugs	American Bank Center
No scoring		First period	Grayson Gerhard (1) - 1:13; Evan Hoglund (1) - pp - 3:44; David Ehrhard (1) - 6:01; William-Alexis Tremblay (1) - pp - 19:08
2:56 - Islom Dzhabberganov (1)		Second period	Jason Simons (1) - 5:09; David Ehrhard (2) - pp - 5:52; David Ehrhard (3) - 8:57
10:16 - James Chase (1)		Third period	No scoring
Xander Miceli (15 saves / 21 shots); Gavin Melcher (16 saves / 17 shots)		Goalie stats	Ethan Phillips (31 saves / 33 shots)

April 11	Corpus Christi IceRays	1 – 4	Shreveport Mudbugs	American Bank Center
No scoring		First period	No scoring
No scoring		Second period	Joseph Samango (1) - pp - 14:26
11:20 - Sam Troutwine (1)		Third period	Johnathon Berndt (1) - pp - 4:44; Charlie Burchfield (1) - 8:36; Charlie Burchfield (2) - 16:16
Xander Miceli (29 saves / 33 shots)		Goalie stats	Ethan Phillips (35 saves / 36 shots)

Shreveport wins series 2 – 0

==== (S3) El Paso Rhinos vs. (S6) Oklahoma Warriors ====
April 10	El Paso Rhinos	3 – 4	Oklahoma Warriors	El Paso County Coliseum
16:06 - pp - Gaige Giblin (1); 19:23 - pp - Massimiliano Monson (1)		First period	Trace Day (1) - 16:53
No scoring		Second period	Dominik Kiss (1) - 11:59; Jackson Hone (1) - 19:29
17:42 - Ian Kastamo (1)		Third period	Jackson Hone (2) - 1:06
Michael Modelski (20 saves / 24 shots)		Goalie stats	William Stuski (32 saves / 35 shots)

April 11	El Paso Rhinos	5 – 1	Oklahoma Warriors	El Paso County Coliseum
2:54 - Gaige Giblin (2); 11:44 - pp - Kamden Kaiser (1)		First period	No scoring
13:45 - pp - Tommy Shore (1); 17:15 - pp - Troy Hunka (1); 18:25 - Massimiliano Monson (2)		Second period	Keaton Martin (1) - 5:22
No scoring		Third period	No scoring
Michael Modelski (35 saves / 36 shots)		Goalie stats	William Stuski (22 saves / 27 shots)

April 12	El Paso Rhinos	4 – 1	Oklahoma Warriors	El Paso County Coliseum
Troy Hunka (2) - 10:58; Troy Hunka (3) - 12:16; Kamden Kaiser (2) - pp - 15:26		First period	No scoring
No scoring		Second period	No scoring
Alexander Stephen (1) - 9:16		Third period	1:08 - Trace Day (2)
Michael Modelski (35 saves / 36 shots)		Goalie stats	William Stuski (19 saves / 23 shots)

El Paso wins series 2 – 1

== Division Semifinals ==
=== Central Division ===
==== (C1) Austin Bruins vs. (C4) Watertown Shamrocks ====
April 17	Austin Bruins	3 – 2	Watertown Shamrocks	Riverside Arena
15:03 - pp - Augustus Elbert (1)		First period	Antons Macijevskis (1) - pp - 10:09
3:56 - John Flood (1)		Second period	No scoring
6:33 - E.J. Paddington (1)		Third period	Jake Pietila (1) - 14:31
Jack Solomon (27 saves / 29 shots)		Goalie stats	Mason Gudridge (29 saves / 32 shots)

April 18	Austin Bruins	4 – 3	OT	Watertown Shamrocks	Riverside Arena
3:14 - John Flood (2)		First period		Owen Fask (1) - 7:27
No scoring		Second period		No scoring
5:11 - pp - Zander Lipsett (1); 16:07 - pp - Siamion Morschyonok (1)		Third period		Antons Macijevskis (2) - pp - 9:42; Joe Rice (1) - sh - 14:58
1:17 - Nathan Williams (1)		First overtime period		No scoring
Jack Solomon (22 saves / 25 shots)		Goalie stats		Mason Gudridge (41 saves / 45 shots)

April 24	Watertown Shamrocks	3 – 4	OT	Austin Bruins	Prairie Lakes Ice Arena
3:55 - pp - Owen Fask (2)		First period		Nathan Williams (2) - pp - 19:49
4:55 - Henry Miller (1); 8:02 - Payton Struck (1)		Second period		Michael Coleman (1) - 0:39; Matsvei Morschyonok (1) - 18:26
No scoring		Third period		No scoring
No scoring		First overtime period		E.J. Paddington (2) - pp - 8:15
Mason Gudridge (47 saves / 51 shots)		Goalie stats		Jack Solomon (24 saves / 27 shots)

Austin wins series 3 – 0

==== (C2) Bismarck Bobcats vs. (C3) Aberdeen Wings ====
April 17	Bismarck Bobcats	0 – 3	Aberdeen Wings	V.F.W. Sports Center
No scoring		First period	No scoring
No scoring		Second period	No scoring
No scoring		Third period	Easton Edwards (1) - 7:31; David Hrubý (1) - 17:05; Matthew Martin-Gaudreault (1) - sh - en - 18:00
Bryce Francisco (18 saves / 20 shots)		Goalie stats	Adam Dybal (27 saves / 27 shots)

April 18	Bismarck Bobcats	3 – 2	Aberdeen Wings	V.F.W. Sports Center
10:26 - Alex Lunski (1); 14:54 - Royce Pietila (1)		First period	No scoring
13:10 - pp - Mark Evans (1)		Second period	No scoring
No scoring		Third period	Caden Lee (1) - 6:31; Easton Edwards (2) - pp - 16:28
Bryce Francisco (31 saves / 33 shots)		Goalie stats	Adam Dybal (29 saves / 32 shots)

April 24	Aberdeen Wings	2 – 4	Bismarck Bobcats	Odde Ice Center
No scoring		First period	Ben Rakowski (1) - 6:44; Nick Snyder (1) - pp - 8:01; Mark Evans (2) - pp - 18:03
3:15 - Briggs Orr (1)		Second period	Eddie Revenig (1) - 2:03
9:24 - David Hrubý (2)		Third period	No scoring
Adam Dybal (6 saves / 10 shots); Willum Braun (16 saves / 16 shots)		Goalie stats	Bryce Francisco (32 saves / 34 shots)

April 25	Aberdeen Wings	7 – 3	Bismarck Bobcats	Odde Ice Center
2:42 - pp - Easton Edwards (3)		First period	No scoring
0:23 - Jibber Kuhl (1); 1:03 - Owen Pitters (1); 7:14 - Easton Edwards (4); 11:41 - Matthew Martin-Gaudreault (2)		Second period	Hugo Kruse (1) - 13:46; Teddy Richardson (1) - pp - 19:53
11:42 - Cooper Anderson (1); 16:42 - sh - en - Jibber Kuhl (2)		Third period	Nick Snyder (2) - 8:21
Willum Braun (35 saves / 38 shots)		Goalie stats	Bryce Francisco (25 saves / 29 shots); Evan Hazelberg (14 saves / 16 shots)

April 27	Bismarck Bobcats	2 – 6	Aberdeen Wings	V.F.W. Sports Center
6:49 - pp - Caden Bell (1)		First period	Matthew Martin-Gaudreault (3) - 2:54
12:35 - pp - Alex Lunski (2)		Second period	Caden Lee (2) - 5:26; Jibber Kuhl (3) - pp - 19:11
No scoring		Third period	Owen Pitters (2) - 9:00; Brody Dustin (1) - en - 17:34; Brody Austin (2) - en - 18:40
Bryce Francisco (21 saves / 25 shots)		Goalie stats	Willum Braun (35 saves / 37 shots)

Aberdeen wins series 3 – 2

=== East Division ===
==== (E1) Maryland Black Bears vs. (E6) Danbury Jr. Hat Tricks ====
April 17	Maryland Black Bears	6 – 2	Danbury Jr. Hat Tricks	Piney Orchard Ice Arena
14:50 - pp - Sam Osei (1); 15:34 - Kristofers Krūmiņš (1)		First period	Matthew Dabrowski (2) - 18:09
6:09 - Owen Drury (1); 7:50 - Harrison Smith (1)		Second period	No scoring
5:40 - pp - Tanner Duncan (1); 8:49 - pp - William Esterbrooks (1)		Third period	Kai Elkie (1) - pp - 16:49
Ryan Denes (18 saves / 20 shots)		Goalie stats	Jon Dukarič (33 saves / 39 shots)

April 18	Maryland Black Bears	8 – 1	Danbury Jr. Hat Tricks	Piney Orchard Ice Arena
9:40 - pp - Tanner Duncan (2); 8:56 - Brady Anes (1); 11:07 - Liam Doherty (1)		First period	No scoring
10:54 - Ryan Franks (1); 13:26 - Ryan Franks (2); 16:26 - Graiden Insana (1)		Second period	Gavin Burke (1) - sh - 19:21
12:47 - pp - William Esterbrooks (2); 16:13 - pp - Brady Anes (2)		Third period	No scoring
Ryan Denes (15 saves / 16 shots)		Goalie stats	Jon Dukarič (11 saves / 16 shots); Luke Brassil (16 saves / 19 shots)

April 23	Danbury Jr. Hat Tricks	4 – 5	Maryland Black Bears	Danbury Ice Arena
8:47 - pp - Matthew Dabrowski (3)		First period	Ryan Franks (3) - pp - 12:57
4:08 - sh - Brendan Boring (3)		Second period	Tanner Duncan (3) - pp - 7:51; Kristofers Krūmiņš (2) - pp - 16:05
2:18 - Ryan Lukko (1); 9:37 - Patrik Ula (1)		Third period	Owen Drury (2) - 8:07; Ryan Franks (4) - 10:25
Jon Dukarič (29 saves / 34 shots)		Goalie stats	Ryan Denes (23 saves / 27 shots)

Maryland wins series 3 – 0

==== (E2) Rochester Jr. Americans vs. (E4) Northeast Generals ====
April 17	Rochester Jr. Americans	4 – 3	OT	Northeast Generals	Rochester Ice Center
No scoring		First period		No scoring
5:45 - Keanan Dewberry (1); 15:33 - pp - Ryan Flaherty (1)		Second period		Braydon Hudtloff (1) - pp - 10:33
13:08 - Adam Gionta (1)		Third period		Michael Bartkowski (1) - 4:25; Richard Rucireto (3) - pp - 6:27
11:47 - Logan Keup (1)		First overtime period		No scoring
Florian Wade (41 saves / 44 shots)		Goalie stats		Will Mizenko (29 saves / 33 shots)

April 18	Rochester Jr. Americans	3 – 0	Northeast Generals	Rochester Ice Center
4:06 - Matt Portz (1)		First period	No scoring
5:59 - Ryan Flaherty (2)		Second period	No scoring
17:53 - en - Lukas Bellinger (1)		Third period	No scoring
Florian Wade (30 saves / 30 shots)		Goalie stats	Will Mizenko (32 saves / 34 shots)

April 23	Northeast Generals	2 – 1	Rochester Jr. Americans	Canton Ice House
8:05 - Stephen Fabiano (1)		First period	No scoring
6:13 - Drew Gibbons (1)		Second period	No scoring
No scoring		Third period	Matt Portz (2) - 12:49
Will Mizenko (34 saves / 35 shots)		Goalie stats	Florian Wade (30 saves / 32 shots)

April 24	Northeast Generals	4 – 3	Rochester Jr. Americans	Canton Ice House
No scoring		First period	No scoring
10:26 - Robert Savaglio (1)		Second period	No scoring
1:13 - pp - Logan Poulin (4); 4:21 - sh - Drew Gibbons (2); 17:00 - pp - Beckett Hinchsliff (2)		Third period	Adam Gionta (2) - pp - 2:59; Konner Powell (1) - 4:54; Adam Gionta (3) - 9:04
Will Mizenko (26 saves / 29 shots)		Goalie stats	Florian Wade (28 saves / 32 shots)

April 26	Rochester Jr. Americans	5 – 4	OT	Northeast Generals	Rochester Ice Center
No scoring		First period		Cole McKenna (3) - 18:48
8:05 - Ryan Flaherty (3); 10:50 - Konner Powell (2); 11:34 - Adam Gionta (4)		Second period		Drew Gibbons (3) - 13:50; Michael Bartkowski (2) - 15:04
5:26 - Colin Dustin (1)		Third period		Logan Poulin (5) - 16:35
11:10 - Colin Dustin (2)		First overtime period		No scoring
Florian Wade (39 saves / 43 shots)		Goalie stats		Will Mizenko (43 saves / 48 shots)

Rochester wins series 3 – 2

=== Midwest Division ===
==== (MW1) Minnesota Wilderness vs. (MW4) Anchorage Wolverines ====
April 17	Minnesota Wilderness	2 – 3	Anchorage Wolverines	St. Lukes Sports and Event Center
11:30 - Talan Blanck (1)		First period	Luc Bydal (1) - 1:18
No scoring		Second period	Luc Bydal (2) - 14:37
19:48 - Theo Kiss (1)		Third period	Luc Bydal (3) - 8:44
Valdemar Andersen (26 saves / 29 shots)		Goalie stats	Kai Weigel (28 saves / 30 shots)

April 18	Minnesota Wilderness	5 – 0	Anchorage Wolverines	St. Lukes Sports and Event Center
0:44 - Talan Blanck (2); 7:46 - Avery Anderson (1); 10:55 - Zach Homer (1)		First period	No scoring
No scoring		Second period	No scoring
0:21 - pp - Talan Blanck (2); 5:43 - pp - Logan Nagle (1)		Third period	No scoring
Ryan Gerlich (23 saves / 23 shots)		Goalie stats	Kai Weigel (26 saves / 31 shots); Drake Owens (1 save / 1 shot)

April 19	Minnesota Wilderness	4 – 0	Anchorage Wolverines	St. Lukes Sports and Event Center
Zach Homer (2) - 0:48; Anthony Cappello (1) - 1:23		First period	No scoring
Zach Homer (3) - pp - 0:42		Second period	No scoring
Talan Blanck (4) - 6:31		Third period	No scoring
Ryan Gerlich (26 saves / 26 shots)		Goalie stats	Kai Weigel (25 saves / 29 shots)

April 24	Anchorage Wolverines	2 – 3	OT	Minnesota Wilderness	Sullivan Arena
No scoring		First period		No scoring
No scoring		Second period		Avery Anderson (2) - pp - 9:46; Talan Blanck (5) - pp - 19:25
7:11 - Jack McKenna (1); 19:59 - Caleb Mahar (1)		Third period		No scoring
No scoring		First overtime period		Max Edwards (1) - 9:51
Kai Weigel (22 saves / 25 shots)		Goalie stats		Ryan Gerlich (30 saves / 32 shots)

Minnesota wins series 3 – 1

==== (MW2) Fairbanks Ice Dogs vs. (MW3) Wisconsin Windigo ====
April 17	Fairbanks Ice Dogs	0 – 3	Wisconsin Windigo	Big Dipper Ice Arena
No scoring		First period	No scoring
No scoring		Second period	No scoring
No scoring		Third period	Joshua Sardo (1) - pp - 12:55; A.J. Bongiorno (1) - 14:48; Brendan Finley (1) - en - 19:53
Miles Roberts (18 saves / 20 shots)		Goalie stats	Max Larsson (31 saves / 31 shots)

April 18	Fairbanks Ice Dogs	0 – 1	Wisconsin Windigo	Big Dipper Ice Arena
No scoring		First period	No scoring
No scoring		Second period	A.J. Bongiorno (2) - 7:24
No scoring		Third period	No scoring
No scoring		Overtime	No scoring
Miles Roberts (19 saves / 20 shots)		Goalie stats	Max Larsson (29 saves / 29 shots)

April 19	Fairbanks Ice Dogs	3 – 0	Wisconsin Windigo	Big Dipper Ice Arena
No scoring		First period	No scoring
Dean Andrews (1) - 7:21; Olivér Barna (1) - pp - 18:31		Second period	No scoring
Luke Osborn (1) - en - 16:35		Third period	No scoring
Miles Roberts (23 saves / 23 shots)		Goalie stats	Max Larsson (39 saves / 41 shots)

April 24	Wisconsin Windigo	1 – 2	Fairbanks Ice Dogs	The Ponds of Brookfield Ice Arena
No scoring		First period	Matthew Volkman (1) - 11:22
No scoring		Second period	No scoring
19:55 - Joshua Sardo (2)		Third period	Matthew Volkman (2) - 3:54
Max Larsson (25 saves / 27 shots)		Goalie stats	Miles Roberts (35 saves / 36 shots)

April 25	Wisconsin Windigo	5 – 2	Fairbanks Ice Dogs	The Ponds of Brookfield Ice Arena
Jackson Ernst (1) - 18:42		First period	No scoring
No scoring		Second period	No scoring
Jackson Ernst (2) - 10:24; Thomas Quast (1) - 11:13; Brayden Severin (1) - 16:42; Ryan Mottau (1) - en - 19:28		Third period	3:17 - Mason Knaffla (1); 8:36 - Luca Ricciardi (1)
Max Larsson (29 saves / 31 shots)		Goalie stats	Miles Roberts (34 saves / 38 shots)

Wisconsin wins series 3 – 2

=== South Division ===
==== (S1) Lone Star Brahmas vs. (S5) Shreveport Mudbugs ====
April 17	Lone Star Brahmas	4 – 1	Shreveport Mudbugs	NYTEX Sports Centre
8:08 - Vladmir Saibel (1)		First period	No scoring
4:58 - Nolan Wildfong (1)		Second period	Duke Ehrhard (4) - 1:44
6:35 - Loic Nasreddine (1); 17:22 - en - Leo Isaksson (1)		Third period	No scoring
Brady Krey (27 saves / 28 shots)		Goalie stats	Ethan Phillips (29 saves / 32 shots)

April 18	Lone Star Brahmas	5 – 1	Shreveport Mudbugs	NYTEX Sports Centre
No scoring		First period	Duke Ehrhard (5) - 5:02
1:09 - pp - Vladmir Saibel (2); 17:44 - pp - Denver Damphousse (2); 19:45 - Christian Venticinque (2)		Second period	No scoring
17:31 - pp - Tyler Scanlon (1); 18:28 - en - Tyler Scanlon (2)		Third period	No scoring
Brady Krey (19 saves / 20 shots)		Goalie stats	Ethan Phillips (23 saves / 27 shots)

April 24	Shreveport Mudbugs	0 – 2	Lone Star Brahmas	Hirsch Memorial Coliseum
No scoring		First period	No scoring
No scoring		Second period	No scoring
No scoring		Third period	Gustav Lexell (1) - 4:57; Vladmir Saibel (3) - en - 18:56
Ethan Phillips (14 saves / 15 shots)		Goalie stats	Brady Krey (25 saves / 25 shots)

Lone Star wins series 3 – 0

==== (S2) New Mexico Ice Wolves vs. (S3) El Paso Rhinos ====
April 17	New Mexico Ice Wolves	5 – 6	OT	El Paso Rhinos	Outpost Ice Arenas
13:14 - Sean Smith (1)		First period		Ethan Woolcott (1) - sh - 4:49; Jacob Solano (1) - pp - 17:00
5:23 - Andrey Moskvitin (1); 10:48 - Nayan Pai (1); 17:36 - pp - Nayan Pai (2)		Second period		Ian Kastamo (1) - 10:41
12:23 - Brock Fairbanks (1)		Third period		Ethan Woolcott (2) - pp - 13:31; Kamden Kaiser (3) - 18:41
No scoring		First overtime period		Alexander Stephen (2) - 10:57
Jackson Silverberg (35 saves / 41 shots)		Goalie stats		Michael Modelski (24 saves / 29 shots)

April 18	New Mexico Ice Wolves	2 – 5	El Paso Rhinos	Outpost Ice Arenas
No scoring		First period	Tommy Shore (2) - pp - 12:20
3:07 - Jeremy Sprung (1); 19:01 - Jake Kasay (1)		Second period	Raphaël Laviolette (1) - 15:33
No scoring		Third period	Jacob Solano (2) - pp - 2:44; Ethan Woolcott (3) - 17:50; Alexander Stephen (3) - en - 19:31
Jackson Silverberg (15 saves / 19 shots)		Goalie stats	Michael Modelski (24 saves / 26 shots)

April 24	El Paso Rhinos	3 – 2	OT	New Mexico Ice Wolves	El Paso County Coliseum
No scoring		First period		No scoring
1:45 - Aidan Bergner (1); 5:08 - pp - Ethan Woolcott (4)		Second period		Sloan Farmer (1) - 3:31; Sean Smith (2) - 3:31
No scoring		Third period		No scoring
9:15 - Jacob Solano (3)		First overtime period		No scoring
Michael Modelski (42 saves / 44 shots)		Goalie stats		Jackson Silverberg (30 saves / 33 shots)

El Paso wins series 3 – 0

== Division Finals ==
=== Central Division ===
==== (C1) Austin Bruins vs. (C3) Aberdeen Wings ====
May 1	Austin Bruins	3 – 2	Aberdeen Wings	Riverside Arena
2:00 - pp - E.J. Paddington (3)		First period	Jibber Kuhl (4) - 11:35
No scoring		Second period	Brody Dustin (3) - 9:47
5:09 - Matsvei Morschyonok (2); 11:30 - Matsvei Morschyonok (3)		Third period	No scoring
Jack Solomon (23 saves / 25 shots)		Goalie stats	Willum Braun (28 saves / 31 shots)

May 2	Austin Bruins	0 – 2	Aberdeen Wings	Riverside Arena
No scoring		First period	Brody Dustin (4) - 15:04
No scoring		Second period	No scoring
No scoring		Third period	Easton Edwards (5) - pp - en - 19:55
Jack Solomon (23 saves / 24 shots)		Goalie stats	Willum Braun (30 saves / 30 shots)

May 8	Aberdeen Wings	4 – 0	Austin Bruins	Odde Ice Center
9:58 - Matthew Martin-Gaudreault (4)		First period	No scoring
4:35 - pp - Matthew Martin-Gaudreault (5)		Second period	No scoring
8:13 - Caden Lee (3); 15:19 - en - Caden Lee (4)		Third period	No scoring
Willum Braun (28 saves / 28 shots)		Goalie stats	Jack Solomon (29 saves / 32 shots)

May 9	Aberdeen Wings	2 – 4	Austin Bruins	Odde Ice Center
No scoring		First period	E.J. Paddington (4) - pp - 10:05
12:11 - Cooper Anderson (2)		Second period	Zander Lipsett (2) - 3:11
6:40 - Anthony Ciaramitaro (1)		Third period	Michael Coleman (2) - 17:33; Sam Kline (1) - en - 18:56
Willum Braun (33 saves / 36 shots)		Goalie stats	Cody Butikis (24 saves / 26 shots)

May 11	Austin Bruins	2 – 1	Aberdeen Wings	Riverside Arena
13:52 - pp - Gavin Hruza (1)		First period	Anthony Ciaramitaro (2) - 7:59
1:22 - Zander Lipsett (3)		Second period	No scoring
No scoring		Third period	No scoring
Cody Butikis (29 saves / 30 shots)		Goalie stats	Willum Braun (37 saves / 39 shots)

Austin wins series 3 – 2

=== East Division ===
==== (E1) Maryland Black Bears vs. (E2) Rochester Jr. Americans ====
May 1	Maryland Black Bears	4 – 0	Rochester Jr. Americans	Piney Orchard Ice Arena
7:26 - William Esterbrooks (3)		First period	No scoring
14:04 - Graiden Insana (2)		Second period	No scoring
3:40 - Owen Drury (3); 16:54 - Brayden Wade (1)		Third period	No scoring
Ryan Denes (26 saves / 26 shots)		Goalie stats	Florian Wade (34 saves / 38 shots)

May 2	Maryland Black Bears	1 – 3	Rochester Jr. Americans	Piney Orchard Ice Arena
No scoring		First period	No scoring
8:55 - Graiden Insana (3)		Second period	Murray Kanerva (1) - 1:41; Lukas Bellinger (2) - 16:40
No scoring		Third period	Keanan Dewberry (2) - en - 19:05
Ryan Denes (22 saves / 24 shots)		Goalie stats	Florian Wade (29 saves / 30 shots)

May 7	Rochester Jr. Americans	2 – 5	Maryland Black Bears	Rochester Ice Center
1:57 - Cameron Doran (1)		First period	Tanner Duncan (4) - 1:03; Owen Drury (4) - 11:13
18:05 - Dexter Kichline (1)		Second period	Kristofers Krūmiņš (3) - pp - 3:14; Tanner Duncan (5) - pp - 6:14; Daniel Johnson (1) - 10:31
No scoring		Third period	No scoring
Florian Wade (24 saves / 29 shots)		Goalie stats	Ryan Denes (24 saves / 26 shots)

May 8	Rochester Jr. Americans	3 – 4	OT	Maryland Black Bears	Rochester Ice Center
2:37 - Keanan Dewberry (3); 4:03 - Leo Mantenuto (1)		First period		No scoring
18:55 - Keanan Dewberry (4)		Second period		Trey Hinton (1) - pp - 8:54
No scoring		Third period		Brady Anes (3) - 14:04; Harrison Smith (2) - 19:35
No scoring		First overtime period		Harrison Smith (3) - 1:08
Florian Wade (52 saves / 56 shots)		Goalie stats		Ryan Denes (16 saves / 19 shots)

Maryland wins series 3 – 1

=== Midwest Division ===
==== (MW1) Minnesota Wilderness vs. (MW3) Wisconsin Windigo ====
May 1	Minnesota Wilderness	3 – 4	OT	Wisconsin Windigo	St. Lukes Sports and Event Center
5:10 - pp - Zach Homer (4); 18:26 - Max Edwards (2)		First period		No scoring
No scoring		Second period		Ryan Mottau (2) - pp - 1:01; Payton Mithmuangneua (1) - 1:20; Thomas Quast (2) - 7:01
5:07 - Avery Anderson (3)		Third period		No scoring
No scoring		First overtime period		11:40 - Joshua Sardo (3)
Ryan Gerlich (33 saves / 37 shots)		Goalie stats		Max Larsson (44 saves / 47 shots)

May 2	Minnesota Wilderness	2 – 3	Wisconsin Windigo	St. Lukes Sports and Event Center
10:16 - Bryce Dahl (1)		First period	Aidan Hickok (1) - pp - 15:15
2:04 - Talan Blanck (6)		Second period	Ryan Mottau (3) - 8:19
No scoring		Third period	Beau Kralovec (1) - 6:08
Ryan Gerlich (28 saves / 31 shots)		Goalie stats	Max Larsson (29 saves / 31 shots)

May 8	Wisconsin Windigo	4 – 6	Minnesota Wilderness	The Ponds of Brookfield Ice Arena
12:50 - pp - Jackson Ernst (3)		First period	Avery Anderson (4) - 0:40; Noah Dziver (1) - 17:14
No scoring		Second period	Talan Blanck (7) - pp - 13:46; Zach Homer (5) - pp - 16:27
0:36 - Aidan Hickok (2); 13:46 - pp - Joshua Sardo (4); 17:09 - Joshua Sardo (5)		Third period	Noah Dziver (2) - 6:17; Avery Anderson (5) - en - 18:58
Max Larsson (25 saves / 30 shots)		Goalie stats	Ryan Gerlich (20 saves / 24 shots)

May 9	Wisconsin Windigo	1 – 5	Minnesota Wilderness	The Ponds of Brookfield Ice Arena
16:48 - pp - Jackson Ernst (4)		First period	Zach Homer (6) - 3:40; Zach Homer (7) - 10:01; Jack Martens (1) - 17:24
No scoring		Second period	Kevin Lysohir (1) - 17:06
No scoring		Third period	Caleb Kim (1) - pp - 10:15
Max Larsson (13 saves / 17 shots); Easton Cody (12 saves / 13 shots)		Goalie stats	Valdemar Andersen (34 saves / 35 shots)

May 11	Minnesota Wilderness	3 – 0	Wisconsin Windigo	St. Lukes Sports and Event Center
No scoring		First period	No scoring
6:30 - Zach Homer (8); 11:42 - Landon Cottingham (1); 17:28 - pp - Avery Anderson (6)		Second period	No scoring
No scoring		Third period	No scoring
Valdemar Andersen (24 saves / 24 shots)		Goalie stats	Max Larsson (27 saves / 30 shots)

Minnesota wins series 3 – 2

=== South Division ===
==== (S1) Lone Star Brahmas vs. (S3) El Paso Rhinos ====
May 1	Lone Star Brahmas	5 – 0	El Paso Rhinos	NYTEX Sports Centre
No scoring		First period	No scoring
1:16 - Nathan Murray (1); 5:29 - Christian Venticinque (2)		Second period	No scoring
2:34 - Gustav Lexell (2); 9:30 - Dylan McFadden (1); 17:50 - pp - Vladimir Saibel (4)		Third period	No scoring
Brady Key (18 saves / 18 shots)		Goalie stats	Michael Modelski (28 saves / 33 shots)

May 2	Lone Star Brahmas	2 – 1	El Paso Rhinos	NYTEX Sports Centre
3:46 - Samuel Lussier (1)		First period	No scoring
No scoring		Second period	No scoring
8:03 - pp - Leo Isaksson (2)		Third period	Gaige Giblin (3) - pp - 17:01
Brady Key (39 saves / 40 shots)		Goalie stats	Michael Modelski (30 saves / 32 shots)

May 7	El Paso Rhinos	1 – 4	Lone Star Brahmas	El Paso County Coliseum
10:47 - Alexi Grégoire (1)		First period	Jackson Vaites (1) - 15:00
No scoring		Second period	Vincenzo Capano (1) - 1:31; Denver Damphousse (2) - 3:15
No scoring		Third period	Christian Venticinque (3) - 17:02
Michael Modelski (18 saves / 22 shots)		Goalie stats	Brady Key (34 saves / 35 shots)

Lone Star wins series 3 – 0

== Semifinals ==
=== (E1) Maryland Black Bears vs. (S3) Lone Star Brahmas ===
May 15	Maryland Black Bears	3 – 2	OT	Lone Star Brahmas	Fogerty Ice Arena
No scoring		First period		No scoring
No scoring		Second period		Gustav Lexell (3) - pp - 6:06; Gustav Lexell (4) - 13:31
3:46 - Harrison Smith (4); 19:53 - pp - Kristofers Krūmiņš (4)		Third period		No scoring
5:46 - pp - Ryan Franks (5)		First overtime period		No scoring
Ryan Denes (23 saves 25 shots)		Goalie stats		Brady Krey (25 saves / 28 shots)

May 16	Lone Star Brahmas	4 – 5	OT	Maryland Black Bears	Fogerty Ice Arena
Leo Isaksson (3) - pp - 18:37		First period		15:11 - pp - Ryan Franks (6)
Vincenzo Capano (2) - 1:21; Christian Venticinque (4) - 11:18		Second period		No scoring
Jackson Vaites (2) - 12:30		Third period		2:14 - pp - William Esterbrooks (4); 8:26 - Brady Anes (4); 15:36 - Ryan Franks (7)
No scoring		First overtime period		5:04 - Ryan Franks (8)
Brady Krey (32 saves / 37 shots)		Goalie stats		Ryan Denes (22 saves / 26 shots)

Maryland wins series 2 – 0

=== (C1) Austin Bruins vs. (MW1) Minnesota Wilderness ===
May 15	Austin Bruins	3 – 4	OT	Minnesota Wilderness	Fogerty Ice Arena
5:23 - Matsvei Morschyonok (4)		First period		Talan Blanck (8) - pp - 16:14; Talan Blanck (9) - 19:07
No scoring		Second period		No scoring
10:21 - sh - Matsvei Morschyonok (5); 13:44 - E.J. Paddington (5)		Third period		Olle Karlsson (1) - 16:37
No scoring		First overtime period		6:48 - Talan Blanck (10)
Cody Butikis (26 saves / 30 shots)		Goalie stats		Valdemar Andersen (26 saves / 29 shots)

May 16	Minnesota Wilderness	7 – 3	Austin Bruins	Fogerty Ice Arena
Talan Blanck (11) - 5:01; Noah Dziver (3) - pp - 8:26		First period	7:33 - pp - E.J. Paddington (6)
Noah Dziver (4) - 4:17; Logan Nagle (2) - 4:29; Caleb Kim (2) - 9:04		Second period	13:19 - pp - Sam Kline (2)
Talan Blanck (12) - sh - 5:55; Olle Karlsson (2) - en - 13:16		Third period	14:17 - Gavin Hruza (2)
Valdemar Andersen (38 saves / 41 shots)		Goalie stats	Jack Solomon (12 saves / 17 shots); Cody Butikis (9 saves / 10 shots)

Minnesota wins series 2 – 0

== Robertson Cup Finals ==
=== (E1) Maryland Black Bears vs. (MW1) Minnesota Wilderness ===
May 19	Maryland Black Bears	3 – 2	OT	Minnesota Wilderness	Fogerty Ice Arena
No scoring		First period		No scoring
2:19 - Tanner Duncan (6)		Second period		Robinson Djian (1) - 3:01; Avery Anderson (7) - 4:23
7:54 - Harrison Smith (5)		Third period		No scoring
5:25 - Brady Anes (5)		First overtime period		No scoring
Ryan Denes (38 saves / 40 shots)		Goalie stats		Valdemar Andersen (21 saves / 24 shots)
