= 2024–25 NAHL season =

- League: North American Hockey League
- Sport: Ice hockey
- Duration: Regular season September 13, 2024 – April 12, 2025; Postseason; April 11 – May 20, 2025
- Games: 59
- Teams: 35

Draft
- Top draft pick: Travis Lefere
- Picked by: Watertown Shamrocks

Regular season
- Season champions: Bismarck Bobcats
- Season MVP: Tomas Anderson (Bismarck Bobcats)
- Top scorer: Alex Laurenza (Austin Bruins)

Robertson Cup Playoffs
- Robertson Cup Playoffs MVP: Julian Beaumont (Bobcats)
- Finals champions: Bismarck Bobcats
- Runners-up: Lone Star Brahmas

NAHL seasons
- ← 2023–24 2025–26 →

The 2024–25 NAHL season was the 50th season of the North American Hockey League. The regular season ran from September 13, 2024 to April 12, 2025 with a 59-game schedule for each team. The Bismarck Bobcats won the regular season championship and went on to defeat the Lone Star Brahmas 4–2 in the Championship game to capture the Robertson Cup.

== Showcases ==
The league held a showcase tournament at the Schwan Super Rink in Blaine, Minnesota from September 25 to 28. All 35 league members as well as the USNTDP U-17 team played three games.

A prospect tournament was also held in mid-February that included one team from each division as well as two teams selected in consultation with the NHL Central Scouting Bureau.

== Member changes ==
- In 2023, the NAHL granted a provisional franchise to Watertown, South Dakota following the completion of the Prairie Lakes Ice Arena. Construction delays pushed back the opening of the new rink, however, the Watertown Shamrocks were eventually approved to play their first season in 2024–25.
- The Minnesota Mallards were added as an expansion team in April of 2024 for this season. A week later, the Elmira Aviators were approved as an additional expansion franchise.

== Regular season ==
The standings at the end of the regular season were as follows:

Note: x = clinched playoff berth; y = clinched division title; z = clinched regular season title

=== Standings ===
==== Central Division ====
| Team | GP | W | L | OTL | SOL | Pts | GF | GA |
|---|---|---|---|---|---|---|---|---|
| xyz – Bismarck Bobcats | 59 | 47 | 10 | 1 | 1 | 96 | 206 | 103 |
| x – Austin Bruins | 59 | 42 | 12 | 3 | 2 | 89 | 194 | 116 |
| x – Minot Minotauros | 59 | 40 | 18 | 1 | 0 | 81 | 208 | 129 |
| x – Aberdeen Wings | 59 | 35 | 22 | 2 | 0 | 72 | 195 | 170 |
| St. Cloud Norsemen | 59 | 30 | 22 | 1 | 6 | 67 | 168 | 164 |
| Watertown Shamrocks | 59 | 19 | 33 | 2 | 5 | 45 | 141 | 197 |
| North Iowa Bulls | 59 | 19 | 34 | 4 | 2 | 44 | 159 | 212 |
| Minnesota Mallards | 59 | 10 | 45 | 2 | 2 | 24 | 122 | 272 |

==== East Division ====
| Team | GP | W | L | OTL | SOL | Pts | GF | GA |
|---|---|---|---|---|---|---|---|---|
| xy – Rochester Jr. Americans | 59 | 39 | 12 | 3 | 5 | 86 | 224 | 141 |
| x – Maryland Black Bears | 59 | 35 | 17 | 4 | 3 | 77 | 196 | 160 |
| x – Maine Nordiques | 59 | 35 | 18 | 4 | 2 | 76 | 188 | 146 |
| x – New Jersey Titans | 59 | 32 | 20 | 6 | 1 | 71 | 195 | 196 |
| x – Johnstown Tomahawks | 59 | 31 | 23 | 3 | 2 | 67 | 183 | 188 |
| x – New Hampshire Mountain Kings | 59 | 27 | 29 | 2 | 1 | 57 | 201 | 210 |
| Philadelphia Rebels | 59 | 26 | 30 | 2 | 1 | 55 | 177 | 190 |
| Danbury Jr. Hat Tricks | 59 | 23 | 33 | 3 | 0 | 49 | 182 | 223 |
| Elmira Aviators | 59 | 21 | 34 | 3 | 1 | 46 | 157 | 228 |
| Northeast Generals | 59 | 19 | 33 | 4 | 3 | 45 | 197 | 250 |

==== Midwest Division ====
| Team | GP | W | L | OTL | SOL | Pts | GF | GA |
|---|---|---|---|---|---|---|---|---|
| xy – Wisconsin Windigo | 59 | 41 | 14 | 1 | 3 | 86 | 228 | 156 |
| x – Fairbanks Ice Dogs | 59 | 37 | 16 | 3 | 3 | 80 | 209 | 150 |
| x – Anchorage Wolverines | 59 | 36 | 17 | 2 | 4 | 78 | 234 | 188 |
| x – Chippewa Steel | 59 | 30 | 23 | 2 | 4 | 66 | 182 | 186 |
| Minnesota Wilderness | 59 | 30 | 25 | 4 | 0 | 64 | 210 | 197 |
| Springfield Jr. Blues | 59 | 27 | 27 | 3 | 2 | 59 | 158 | 182 |
| Kenai River Brown Bears | 59 | 21 | 30 | 4 | 4 | 50 | 159 | 216 |
| Janesville Jets | 59 | 17 | 36 | 3 | 3 | 40 | 144 | 230 |

==== South Division ====
| Team | GP | W | L | OTL | SOL | Pts | GF | GA |
|---|---|---|---|---|---|---|---|---|
| xy – Lone Star Brahmas | 59 | 44 | 11 | 2 | 2 | 92 | 195 | 92 |
| x – Shreveport Mudbugs | 59 | 36 | 18 | 4 | 1 | 77 | 184 | 155 |
| x – Corpus Christi IceRays | 59 | 35 | 19 | 2 | 3 | 75 | 201 | 179 |
| x – New Mexico Ice Wolves | 59 | 31 | 21 | 4 | 3 | 69 | 163 | 155 |
| x – El Paso Rhinos | 59 | 29 | 26 | 1 | 3 | 62 | 183 | 188 |
| x – Colorado Grit | 59 | 23 | 24 | 8 | 4 | 58 | 154 | 190 |
| Odessa Jackalopes | 59 | 26 | 29 | 4 | 0 | 56 | 209 | 208 |
| Amarillo Wranglers | 59 | 24 | 29 | 2 | 4 | 54 | 157 | 196 |
| Oklahoma Warriors | 59 | 16 | 33 | 7 | 3 | 42 | 137 | 220 |

=== Statistics ===
==== Scoring leaders ====
The following players led the league in regular season points at the completion of games played on April 12, 2025.

| Player | Team | GP | G | A | Pts | PIM |
|---|---|---|---|---|---|---|
| Alex Laurenza | Austin Bruins | 55 | 36 | 46 | 82 | 47 |
| Luc Malkhassian | Austin Bruins | 59 | 27 | 51 | 78 | 28 |
| Oli Genest | New Hampshire Mountain Kings | 59 | 41 | 36 | 77 | 40 |
| Niko Tournas | Danbury Jr. Hat Tricks | 56 | 39 | 35 | 74 | 36 |
| Calle Karlsson | Rochester Jr. Americans | 59 | 31 | 42 | 73 | 12 |
| Ian Spencer | Minot Minotauros | 58 | 25 | 46 | 71 | 122 |
| Jack Hillier | New Jersey Titans | 56 | 18 | 52 | 70 | 36 |
| Braydon Beahm | Wisconsin Windigo | 57 | 33 | 36 | 69 | 38 |
| Richard Rucireto | Northeast Generals | 59 | 29 | 39 | 68 | 43 |
| Brock Devlin | Anchorage Wolverines | 54 | 12 | 55 | 67 | 50 |

==== Leading goaltenders ====
Note: GP = Games played; Mins = Minutes played; W = Wins; L = Losses; OTL = Overtime losses; SOL = Shootout losses; SO = Shutouts; GAA = Goals against average; SV% = Save percentage

| Player | Team | GP | Mins | W | L | OTL | SOL | SO | SV% | GAA |
|---|---|---|---|---|---|---|---|---|---|---|
| Ryan Cameron | Lone Star Brahmas | 30 | 1737:59 | 21 | 6 | 1 | 0 | 9 | .948 | 1.24 |
| Tomas Anderson | Bismarck Bobcats | 45 | 2700:20 | 37 | 6 | 1 | 1 | 8 | .937 | 1.53 |
| Jack Spicer | Lone Star Brahmas | 22 | 1279:19 | 14 | 5 | 1 | 2 | 3 | .935 | 1.60 |
| Jack Solomon | Austin Bruins | 34 | 2022:52 | 24 | 7 | 2 | 1 | 5 | .932 | 1.81 |
| Lukas Swedin | Minot Minotauros | 42 | 2449:03 | 28 | 14 | 0 | 0 | 6 | .940 | 1.89 |

== Robertson Cup playoffs ==
Teams are reseeded prior to the semifinal round based upon regular season records.

Division Play-in (Best-of-3) | Division Semifinals (Best-of-5)
C1 | Bismarck Bobcats | 3 | 0 | 3 | 4** | 5
C4 | Aberdeen Wings | 4* | 1* | 1 | 3 | 3
Central Division
C2 | Austin Bruins | 1 | 1 | 3 | 4** | 5
C3 | Minot Minotauros | 3 | 2* | 1 | 3 | 1
E4 | New Jersey Titans | 3 | 2 | -
E5 | Johnstown Tomahawks | 6 | 5 | -
E1 | Rochester Jr. Americans | 5 | 2 | 3 | 2 | 6*
E5 | Johnstown Tomahawks | 2 | 1 | 4** | 3* | 5
East Division
E3 | Maine Nordiques | 0 | 2 | 6
E6 | New Hampshire Mountain Kings | 1 | 1 | 2
E2 | Maryland Black Bears | 3 | 2 | 0 | 2 | -
E3 | Maine Nordiques | 4 | 0 | 3 | 5 | -
MW1 | Wisconsin Windigo | 7 | 0 | 3* | 7 | -
MW4 | Chippewa Steel | 3 | 2 | 2 | 3 | -
Midwest Division
MW2 | Fairbanks Ice Dogs | 1 | 1 | 2 | - | -
MW3 | Anchorage Wolverines | 2 | 4 | 3 | - | -
S4 | New Mexico Ice Wolves | 4 | 4 | 4
S5 | El Paso Rhinos | 1 | 5* | 0
S1 | Lone Star Brahmas | 4 | 4 | 5 | - | -
S4 | New Mexico Ice Wolves | 0 | 1 | 1 | - | -
South Division
S3 | Corpus Christi IceRays | 2 | 7 | -
S6 | Colorado Grit | 1 | 3 | -
S2 | Shreveport Mudbugs | 1 | 1 | 0 | - | -
S3 | Corpus Christi IceRays | 2*** | 3 | 3 | - | -

Division Finals (Best-of-5)
C1 | Bismarck Bobcats | 1 | 2 | 2 | 7 | -
C2 | Austin Bruins | 3 | 0 | 1 | 2 | -
E1 | Rochester Jr. Americans | 0 | 1 | 7 | 3* | -
E3 | Maine Nordiques | 2 | 0 | 2 | 2 | -
MW1 | Wisconsin Windigo | 5 | 1 | 4 | 2 | 2
MW3 | Anchorage Wolverines | 2 | 2* | 0 | 4 | 1
S1 | Lone Star Brahmas | 1* | 3 | 5 | - | -
S3 | Corpus Christi IceRays | 0 | 2 | 0 | - | -

Semifinal (Best-of-3)
1 | Bismarck Bobcats | 1 | 3 | 2*
4 | Rochester Jr. Americans | 2 | 2 | 1
2 | Lone Star Brahmas | 0 | 6 | 5*
3 | Wisconsin Windigo | 3 | 3 | 4

Championship (Best-of-1)
1 | Bismarck Bobcats | 4
2 | Lone Star Brahmas | 2

Note: * denotes overtime period(s)

== Division Play-in ==
=== East Division ===
==== (E4) New Jersey Titans vs. (E5) Johnstown Tomahawks ====
| April 11 | New Jersey Titans | 3 – 6 | Johnstown Tomahawks | Middletown Ice World Arena |
| 18:07 - Ryan Friedman (1) | | First period | Adam Ondriš (1) - 10:30 |
| 6:03 - Lucas Marshall (1) | | Second period | Andrew Cowgill (1) - 4:51; Adam Csabi (1) - 12:31; Charlie Zetterkvist (1) - pp - 15:50; Adam Ondriš (2) - 17:02 |
| 6:55 - Alexander Papaspyropoulos (1) | | Third period | Nick White (1) - sh - en - 16:38 |
| Austin McNicholas (30 saves / 35 shots) | | Goalie stats | Nick Avakyan (40 saves / 43 shots) |

| April 12 | New Jersey Titans | 2 – 5 | Johnstown Tomahawks | Middletown Ice World Arena |
| 7:16 - Jack Hillier (1) | | First period | No scoring |
| No scoring | | Second period | Dylan Shane (1) - pp - 13:12 |
| 4:13 - James Taylor (1) | | Third period | Nick Jermain (1) - 2:00; Dylan Shane (1) - 14:00; Hank Reed (1) - 15:56; Nick White (2) - en - 19:42 |
| Austin McNicholas (39 saves / 43 shots) | | Goalie stats | Nick Avakyan (43 saves / 45 shots) |

| Johnstown wins series 2 – 0 |

==== (E3) Maine Nordiques vs. (E6) New Hampshire Mountain Kings ====
| April 11 | Maine Nordiques | 0 – 1 | New Hampshire Mountain Kings | The Colisée |
| No scoring | | First period | No scoring |
| No scoring | | Second period | No scoring |
| No scoring | | Third period | Jack MacDonald (1) - pp - 13:37 |
| Carter Richardson (27 saves / 28 shots) | | Goalie stats | Sam Caulfield (51 saves / 51 shots) |

| April 12 | Maine Nordiques | 2 – 1 | New Hampshire Mountain Kings | The Colisée |
| No scoring | | First period | No scoring |
| No scoring | | Second period | Alex Gelhar (1) - 0:38 |
| 6:37 - Zion Green (1); 10:07 - Connor McNaughton (1) | | Third period | No scoring |
| Carter Richardson (26 saves / 27 shots) | | Goalie stats | Sam Scopa (30 saves / 32 shots) |

| April 13 | Maine Nordiques | 6 – 2 | New Hampshire Mountain Kings | The Colisée |
| Shane Kozlina (1) - 17:21; Michael Stenberg (1) - 18:04 | | First period | 4:08 - Cole Roenick (1) |
| No scoring | | Second period | 5:45 - pp - Jaden Johnson (1) |
| Luke Chappelle (1) - pp - 9:12; Grant Kohnen (1) - pp - 9:48; Kellen Murphy (1) - 13:37; Aidan Lindblad (1) - en - 16:09 | | Third period | No scoring |
| Carter Richardson (27 saves / 29 shots) | | Goalie stats | Sam Caulfield (32 saves / 37 shots) |

| Maine wins series 2 – 1 |

=== South Division ===
==== (S4) New Mexico Ice Wolves vs. (S5) El Paso Rhinos ====
| April 11 | New Mexico Ice Wolves | 4 – 1 | El Paso Rhinos | Outpost Ice Arenas |
| 3:56 - Jacob Guille (1) | | First period | No scoring |
| 10:06 - Liam Waugh (1); 16:44 - Toivo Laaksonen (1); 17:16 - Ben Polomsky | | Second period | No scoring |
| No scoring | | Third period | Trent Anfinson (1) - 3:45 |
| Jackson Fuller (19 saves / 20 shots) | | Goalie stats | Brendan Holahan (31 saves / 35 shots) |

| April 12 | New Mexico Ice Wolves | 4 – 5 | OT | El Paso Rhinos | Outpost Ice Arenas |
| 15:11 - pp - Sean Gibbons (1) | | First period | | Roope Tuomioksa (1) - 11:23; Cade DeWolf (1) - 17:23 |
| 18:15 - pp - Ethan Hull (1) | | Second period | | A.J. Reed (1) - 11:42 |
| 7:14 - Francois de Villiers (1); 10:41 - Max Matthews (1) | | Third period | | Jacob Solano (1) - pp - 3:19 |
| No scoring | | First overtime period | | Harper Lolacher - 1:58 |
| Jackson Fuller (16 saves / 21 shots) | | Goalie stats | | Brendan Holahan (41 saves / 45 shots) |

| April 13 | New Mexico Ice Wolves | 4 – 0 | El Paso Rhinos | Outpost Ice Arenas |
| No scoring | | First period | No scoring |
| Andrew Earl (1) - 10:07; Toivo Laaksonen (2) - 12:59 | | Second period | No scoring |
| Nayan Pai (1) - pp - 3:36; Andrew Earl (2) - 17:02 | | Third period | No scoring |
| Gavin Schahn (16 saves / 16 shots) | | Goalie stats | Brendan Holahan (34 saves / 38 shots) |

| New Mexico wins series 2 – 1 |

==== (S3) Corpus Christi IceRays vs. (S6) Colorado Grit ====
| April 11 | Corpus Christi IceRays | 2 – 1 | Colorado Grit | American Bank Center |
| No scoring | | First period | Lucas Mann (1) - 4:28 |
| No scoring | | Second period | No scoring |
| 0:54 - Cooper Conway (1); 14:11 - Troy Pelton (1) | | Third period | No scoring |
| Benjamin Motew (27 saves / 28 shots) | | Goalie stats | Peter Sterling (24 saves / 26 shots) |

| April 12 | Corpus Christi IceRays | 7 – 3 | Colorado Grit | American Bank Center |
| 8:16 - Nickolaos Sinani (1); 12:26 - Pierson Sobush (1); 19:51 - pp - Carter Krenke (1) | | First period | No scoring |
| 13:30 - Michael Valdez (1); 14:48 - Max Ranström (1); 18:56 - Stepan Kuznetsov (1); 19:20 - Andrew Hayek (1) | | Second period | No scoring |
| No scoring | | Third period | George Poirier (1) - pp - 3:54; George Poirier (2) - pp - 10:27; William Johnson (1) - 17:01 |
| Benjamin Motew (41 saves / 44 shots) | | Goalie stats | Peter Sterling (18 saves / 25 shots); Richard Rafaj (7 saves / 7 shots) |

| Corpus Christi wins series 2 – 0 |

== Division Semifinals ==
=== Central Division ===
==== (C1) Bismarck Bobcats vs. (C4) Aberdeen Wings ====
| April 18 | Bismarck Bobcats | 3 – 4 | OT | Aberdeen Wings | V.F.W. Sports Center |
| No scoring | | First period | | Nikolai Tishkevich (1) - 7:31 |
| 10:22 - Tommy Cronin (1); 11:11 - pp - Louie Kamienski (1) | | Second period | | Bryce Johnson (1) - 8:58; Sebastian Lillsund (1) - pp - 14:41 |
| 18:11 - pp - Keanu Krenn (1) | | Third period | | No scoring |
| No scoring | | First overtime period | | Matthew Martin-Gaudreault (1) - 3:01 |
| Tomas Anderson | | Goalie stats | | Damon Cunningham |

| April 19 | Bismarck Bobcats | 0 – 1 | OT | Aberdeen Wings | V.F.W. Sports Center |
| No scoring | | First period | | No scoring |
| No scoring | | Second period | | No scoring |
| No scoring | | Third period | | No scoring |
| No scoring | | First overtime period | | Cade Moxham (1) - 1:30 |
| Tomas Anderson | | Goalie stats | | Damon Cunningham |

| April 25 | Aberdeen Wings | 1 – 3 | Bismarck Bobcats | Odde Ice Center |
| 13:20 - pp - Bryce Johnson (2) | | First period | Keanu Keenan (2) - 1:31 |
| No scoring | | Second period | Jakub Kopecký (1) - 0:31 |
| No scoring | | Third period | Alexander Kim (1) - en - 19:41 |
| Damon Cunningham | | Goalie stats | Tomas Anderson |

| April 26 | Aberdeen Wings | 3 – 4 | 2OT | Bismarck Bobcats | Odde Ice Center |
| 2:21 - Cade Moxham (2) | | First period | | Ian Engel (1) - 9:49 |
| 8:24 - Ryder Many Grey Horses (1) | | Second period | | Nick Snyder (1) - 13:00 |
| 1:22 - Owen Pitters | | Third period | | Julian Beaumont (1) - 14:05 |
| No scoring | | Second overtime period | | Keanu Krenn (3) - 10:48 |
| Damon Cunningham | | Goalie stats | | Tomas Anderson |

| April 28 | Bismarck Bobcats | 5 – 3 | Aberdeen Wings | V.F.W. Sports Center |
| No scoring | | First period | No scoring |
| 4:23 - Ian Engel (2); 14:14 - Keanu Krenn (4); 18:31 - pp - Alexander Kim (2) | | Second period | Ryder Many Grey Horses (2) - 5:10; Jibber Kuhl (1) - 7:55; Bryce Johnson (3) - 14:55 |
| 15:59 - Josh Lehto (1); 19:57 - sh - en - Keanu Krenn (5) | | Third period | No scoring |
| Tomas Anderson | | Goalie stats | Damon Cunningham |

| Bismarck wins series 3 – 2 |

==== (C2) Austin Bruins vs. (C2) Minot Minotauros ====
| April 18 | Austin Bruins | 1 – 3 | Minot Minotauros | Riverside Arena |
| No scoring | | First period | No scoring |
| 17:26 - Zander Lipsett (1) | | Second period | Billy Batten (1) - 9:31; John Small (1) - 16:34 |
| No scoring | | Third period | Adam Mahler (1) - en - 19:35 |
| Jack Solomon | | Goalie stats | Lukas Swedin |

| April 19 | Austin Bruins | 1 – 2 | OT | Minot Minotauros | Riverside Arena |
| No scoring | | First period | | No scoring |
| No scoring | | Second period | | Braeden Jockims (1) - 5:31 |
| 4:45 - Ryan Lund (1) | | Third period | | No scoring |
| No scoring | | First overtime period | | Jesse Juhola (1) - 0:44 |
| Carl Axelsson | | Goalie stats | | Lukas Swedin |

| April 25 | Minot Minotauros | 1 – 3 | Austin Bruins | Maysa Arena |
| 2:57 - Billy Batten (2) | | First period | No scoring |
| No scoring | | Second period | E.J. Paddington (1) - 5:32; John Hirschfeld (1) - 6:41; Evan Malkhassian (1) - 10:45 |
| No scoring | | Third period | No scoring |
| Lukas Swedin | | Goalie stats | Jack Solomon |

| April 26 | Minot Minotauros | 3 – 4 | 2OT | Austin Bruins | Maysa Arena |
| No scoring | | First period | | John Hirschfeld (2) - 8:40; Luc Malkhassian (1) - 17:39 |
| No scoring | | Second period | | Ludvig Mellgren (1) - 1:28 |
| 4:47 - pp - Jack O'Hanisain (1); 6:11 - Gavin Middendorf (1); 8:33 - pp - Gavin Middendorf (2) | | Third period | | No scoring |
| No scoring | | Second overtime period | | Gavin Hruza (1) - 0:39 |
| Lukas Swedin | | Goalie stats | | Jack Solomon |

| April 28 | Austin Bruins | 5 – 1 | Minot Minotauros | Riverside Arena |
| 6:23 - Luc Malkhassian (2); 9:47 - Luc Malkhassian (3); 13:52 - Gavin Hruza (2) | | First period | No scoring |
| 2:29 - Jackson Rilei (1) | | Second period | No scoring |
| 13:33 - en - Evan Malkhassian (2) | | Third period | Adam Mahler (2) - 18:38 |
| Jack Solomon | | Goalie stats | Lukas Swedin |

| Austin wins series 3 – 2 |

=== East Division ===
==== (E1) Rochester Jr. Americans vs. (E5) Johnstown Tomahawks ====
| April 18 | Rochester Jr. Americans | 5 – 2 | Johnstown Tomahawks | Rochester Ice Center |
| 9:23 - Clay O'Donnell (1) | | First period | Jacob Ingstrup (1) - 10:58 |
| 5:40 - Calle Karlsson (1); 15:26 - Gabe Randel (1) | | Second period | No scoring |
| 12:16 - Clay O'Donnell (2); 15:36 - Landon Brownlee (1) | | Third period | Adam Csabi (2) - 7:25 |
| Danick Leroux; Jensen Carlstrom | | Goalie stats | Nick Avakyan |

| April 19 | Rochester Jr. Americans | 2 – 1 | Johnstown Tomahawks | Rochester Ice Center |
| 16:13 - Owen King (1) | | First period | No scoring |
| 0:39 - Jaden Dyke (1) | | Second period | Ryan Flaherty (1) - 12:44 |
| No scoring | | Third period | No scoring |
| Jensen Carlstrom | | Goalie stats | Nick Avakyan |

| April 25 | Johnstown Tomahawks | 4 – 3 | 2OT | Rochester Jr. Americans | 1st Summit Bank Arena |
| 2:16 - Tate Pecknold (1); 15:30 - pp - Adam Ondriš (3) | | First period | | Ryan Shaw (1) - pp - 14:04; Dexter Kichline (1) - 19:23 |
| 12:38 - Caden Olenczak (1) | | Second period | | No scoring |
| No scoring | | Third period | | J.C. Humphreys (1) - 13:32 |
| 2:53 - Sam Blanton (1) | | Second overtime period | | No scoring |
| Nick Avakyan | | Goalie stats | | Jensen Carlstrom |

| April 26 | Johnstown Tomahawks | 3 – 2 | OT | Rochester Jr. Americans | 1st Summit Bank Arena |
| 0:37 - Cullen Emery (1); 17:59 - Sam Blanton (2) | | First period | | No scoring |
| No scoring | | Second period | | No scoring |
| No scoring | | Third period | | Calle Karlsson (2) - 0:20; Calle Karlsson (3) - 18:14 |
| 3:38 - pp - Caden Olenczak (2) | | First overtime period | | No scoring |
| Nick Avakyan | | Goalie stats | | Jensen Carlstrom |

| April 28 | Rochester Jr. Americans | 6 – 5 | OT | Johnstown Tomahawks | Rochester Ice Center |
| 17:54 - Calle Karlsson (4) | | First period | | Jack Genovese (1) - 18:02 |
| No scoring | | Second period | | Ryan Flaherty (2) - 2:20; Tate Pecknold (2) - 8:37; Adam Ondriš (4) - 16:36 |
| 2:43 - Ryan Shaw (2); 3:22 - Demitri Diflorio (1); 10:25 - sh - Ryan Shaw (3); 17:07 - sh - Jaden Dyke (2) | | Third period | | Tate Pecknold (3) - pp - 5:04 |
| 4:12 - Jaden Dyke (3) | | First overtime period | | No scoring |
| Jensen Carlstrom | | Goalie stats | | Nick Avakyan |

| Rochester wins series 3 – 2 |

==== (E2) Maryland Black Bears vs. (E3) Maine Nordiques ====
| April 18 | Maryland Black Bears | 3 – 4 | Maine Nordiques | Piney Orchard Ice Arena |
| 8:34 - sh - Isac Nielsen (1) | | First period | No scoring |
| 8:07 - Mason Stenger (1) | | Second period | No scoring |
| 12:30 - Tyler Stern (1) | | Third period | Cole Estey (1) - 4:52; Alexandre Pellerin (1) - pp - 7:38; Alexandre Pellerin (2) - 10:46; Ethan Wongus (1) - pp - 16:39 |
| Marko Bilic | | Goalie stats | Carter Richardson |

| April 19 | Maryland Black Bears | 2 – 0 | Maine Nordiques | Piney Orchard Ice Arena |
| No scoring | | First period | No scoring |
| 17:43 - Kareem El-Bashir (1); 19:14 - Isac Nielsen (2) | | Second period | No scoring |
| No scoring | | Third period | No scoring |
| Marko Bilic | | Goalie stats | Carter Richardson |

| April 25 | Maine Nordiques | 3 – 0 | Maryland Black Bears | The Colisée |
| No scoring | | First period | No scoring |
| No scoring | | Second period | No scoring |
| 2:13 - Kellen Murphy (2); 6:28 - sh - Damon Myers (1); 19:34 - en - Ethan Wongus (2) | | Third period | No scoring |
| Carter Richardson | | Goalie stats | Marko Bilic |

| April 26 | Maine Nordiques | 5 – 2 | Maryland Black Bears | The Colisée |
| 13:08 - pp - Laurent Trépanier (1); 14:11 - Connor McNaughton (2); 19:55 - Tomek Haula (1) | | First period | No scoring |
| No scoring | | Second period | Joshua Frenette (1) - 3:59 |
| 0:26 - Ethan Wongus (3); 8:53 - Zion Green (2) | | Third period | Kareem El-Bashir (2) - 16:18 |
| Carter Richardson | | Goalie stats | Marko Bilic |

| Maine wins series 3 – 1 |

=== Midwest Division ===
==== (MW1) Wisconsin Windigo vs. (MW4) Chippewa Steel ====
| April 18 | Wisconsin Windigo | 7 – 3 | Chippewa Steel | Eagle River Sports Arena |
| 4:51 - Zachary Cline (1); 5:54 - Braydon Beahm (1); 10:32 - Ronnie Hill (1) | | First period | Patrick Vogl (1) - 16:11 |
| 2:24 - Michael Ryan (1); 13:34 - Zachary Cline (2) | | Second period | Henry Peterson (1) - 19:35 |
| 4:46 - Wyatt Herres (1); 18:21 - pp - Hunter Hayes (1) | | Third period | Ryder McIntosh (1) - 5:02 |
| Lucas Szyszka | | Goalie stats | Charlie Tritt; Devin Shakar |

| April 19 | Wisconsin Windigo | 0 – 2 | Chippewa Steel | Eagle River Sports Arena |
| No scoring | | First period | Mason Johnson (1) - 18:00 |
| No scoring | | Second period | No scoring |
| No scoring | | Third period | Jackson Lackas (1) - en - 18:03 |
| Lucas Szyszka | | Goalie stats | Devin Shakar |

| April 25 | Chippewa Steel | 2 – 3 | OT | Wisconsin Windigo | Rice Lake Ice Arena |
| No scoring | | First period | | Logan Nickolaus (1) - 6:01; Jackson Ernst (1) - 14:42 |
| 4:42 - Connor Jalbert (1) | | Second period | | No scoring |
| 9:02 - pp - Zachary Sondreal (1) | | Third period | | No scoring |
| No scoring | | First overtime period | | Nate Farrell (1) - 10:40 |
| Devin Shakar | | Goalie stats | | Lucas Szyszka |

| April 2654 | Chippewa Steel | 3 – 7 | Wisconsin Windigo | Rice Lake Ice Arena |
| 1:19 - Connor Jalbert (2) | | First period | Mario DiMaggio (1) - 7:30 |
| No scoring | | Second period | Teddy Richardson (1) - 10:17; Alexios Georgaklis (1) - 10:43; Braydon Beahm (2) - pp - 15:28 |
| 1:11 - Jackson Ernst (2); 8:42 - pp - Camden Davis (1) | | Third period | Logan Nickolaus (2) - 16:04; Cashen Naeve (1) - 17:54; Harper Frey (1) - 19:06 |
| Devin Shakar | | Goalie stats | Lucas Szyszka |

| Wisconsin wins series 3 – 1 |

==== (MW2) Fairbanks Ice Dogs vs. (MW3) Anchorage Wolverines ====
| April 18 | Fairbanks Ice Dogs | 1 – 2 | Anchorage Wolverines | Big Dipper Ice Arena |
| No scoring | | First period | No scoring |
| No scoring | | Second period | Cole Christian (1) - pp - 8:59; Daniel Bagnole (1) - sh - 11:47 |
| 16:46 - pp - Kyle Rohrer (1) | | Third period | No scoring |
| Mason McElroy | | Goalie stats | Michael Manzi |

| April 19 | Fairbanks Ice Dogs | 1 – 4 | Anchorage Wolverines | Big Dipper Ice Arena |
| 12:23 - Luca Ricciardi (1) | | First period | No scoring |
| No scoring | | Second period | Cole Christian (2) - pp - 1:22; Aaron Van Wie (1) - 7:10 |
| No scoring | | Third period | Daniel Bagnole (2) - en - 19:44 |
| Mason McElroy | | Goalie stats | Michael Manzi |

| April 25 | Anchorage Wolverines | 3 – 2 | Fairbanks Ice Dogs | Sullivan Arena |
| 15:12 - pp - Toby Carlson (1) | | First period | No scoring |
| 16:40 - sh - Cole Christian (3) | | Second period | No scoring |
| 14:14 - Tai Ushio (1) | | Third period | Gage Leonard (1) - pp - 3:20; Jackson Fox (1) - 14:37 |
| Michael Manzi | | Goalie stats | Mason McElroy |

| Anchorage wins series 3 – 0 |

=== South Division ===
==== (S1) Lone Star Brahmas vs. (S4) New Mexico Ice Wolves ====
| April 18 | Lone Star Brahmas | 4 – 0 | New Mexico Ice Wolves | NYTEX Sports Centre |
| No scoring | | First period | No scoring |
| 14:54 - Christian Venticinque (1) | | Second period | No scoring |
| 8:14 - Christian Venticinque (2); 9:26 - pp - Saxton Tess (1); 12:34 - sh - Saxton Tess (2) | | Third period | No scoring |
| Ryan Cameron | | Goalie stats | Jackson Fuller |

| April 19 | Lone Star Brahmas | 4 – 1 | New Mexico Ice Wolves | NYTEX Sports Centre |
| 9:23 - Anthony Cappello (1); 11:33 - Owen Kerr (1) | | First period | No scoring |
| No scoring | | Second period | No scoring |
| 16:46 - pp - Elias Kumlin (1); 18:58 - en - Saxton Tess (3) | | Third period | Andrew Earl (3) - 8:49 |
| Ryan Cameron | | Goalie stats | Jackson Fuller |

| April 24 | New Mexico Ice Wolves | 1 – 5 | Lone Star Brahmas | Outpost Ice Arenas |
| No scoring | | First period | Christian Venticinque (3) - 18:13 |
| 5:59 - Jake Kasay (1) | | Second period | No scoring |
| No scoring | | Third period | Zach Rizzo (1) - 4:55; Saxton Tess (4) - 8:32; August Classon (1) - en - 16:32; August Classon (2) - en - 18:19 |
| Jackson Fuller | | Goalie stats | Ryan Cameron |

| Lone Star wins series 3 – 0 |

==== (S2) Shreveport Mudbugs vs. (S3) Corpus Christi IceRays ====
| April 18 | Shreveport Mudbugs | 1 – 2 | 3OT | Corpus Christi IceRays | Hirsch Memorial Coliseum |
| No scoring | | First period | | No scoring |
| No scoring | | Second period | | No scoring |
| 5:09 - pp - Aidan Puley (1) | | Third period | | Will Reardon (1) - 9:09 |
| No scoring | | Third overtime period | | Pierson Sobush (3) - 1:50 |
| Nikola Goich | | Goalie stats | | Benji Motew |

| April 19 | Shreveport Mudbugs | 1 – 3 | Corpus Christi IceRays | Hirsch Memorial Coliseum |
| No scoring | | First period | Carter Krenke (2) - 5:43 |
| No scoring | | Second period | No scoring |
| Andrew Seminara (1) - 8:01 | | Third period | Stepan Kuznetsov (2) - 14:58; Cody Kempf (2) - en - 17:42 |
| Nikola Goich | | Goalie stats | Benji Motew |

| April 21 | Corpus Christi IceRays | 3 – 0 | Shreveport Mudbugs | American Bank Center |
| 7:32 - Michael Valdez (2); 8:58 - Carter Krenke (3) | | First period | No scoring |
| 13:44 - Troy Pelton (2) | | Second period | No scoring |
| No scoring | | Third period | No scoring |
| Benji Motew | | Goalie stats | Nikola Goich |

| Corpus Christi wins series 3 – 0 |

== Division Finals ==
=== Central Division ===
==== (C1) Bismarck Bobcats vs. (C2) Austin Bruins ====
| May 2 | Bismarck Bobcats | 1 – 3 | Austin Bruins | V.F.W. Sports Center |
| No scoring | | First period | Jackson Rilei (2) - 0:28; Gavin Hruza (3) - 5:08 |
| No scoring | | Second period | No scoring |
| 17:45 - Julian Beaumont (2) | | Third period | Nathan Williams (1) - en - 18:25 |
| Tomas Anderson | | Goalie stats | Jack Solomon |

| May 3 | Bismarck Bobcats | 2 – 0 | Austin Bruins | V.F.W. Sports Center |
| No scoring | | First period | No scoring |
| No scoring | | Second period | No scoring |
| 1:04 - Kyle Doll (1); 18:38 - en - Alexander Kim (3) | | Third period | No scoring |
| Tomas Anderson | | Goalie stats | Jack Solomon |

| May 9 | Austin Bruins | 1 – 2 | Bismarck Bobcats | Riverside Arena |
| No scoring | | First period | No scoring |
| No scoring | | Second period | Nick Snyder (2) - 17:53 |
| 9:57 - Ashton Bynum (1) | | Third period | Louie Kamienski (2) - 11:32 |
| Jack Solomon | | Goalie stats | Tomas Anderson |

| May 10 | Austin Bruins | 2 – 7 | Bismarck Bobcats | Riverside Arena |
| No scoring | | First period | Nick Snyder (3) - 6:35; Josh Lehto (2) - 12:41 |
| 5:42 - pp - John Hirschfeld (3) | | Second period | Jakub Kopecký (2) - 3:26 |
| 1:56 - Ashton Bynum (2) | | Third period | Josh Lehto (3) - 7:01; Gabe Kenne (1) - pp - 9:15; Zane Rowan (1) - 15:41; Nick Snyder (4) - pp - 17:26 |
| Jack Solomon | | Goalie stats | Tomas Anderson |

| Bismarck wins series 3 – 1 |

=== East Division ===
==== (E1) Rochester Jr. Americans vs. (E3) Maine Nordiques ====
| May 2 | Rochester Jr. Americans | 0 – 2 | Maine Nordiques | Rochester Ice Center |
| No scoring | | First period | No scoring |
| No scoring | | Second period | Ocean Fancy (1) - 6:10 |
| No scoring | | Third period | Michael Stenberg (2) - 2:21 |
| Jensen Carlstrom | | Goalie stats | Carter Richardson |

| May 3 | Rochester Jr. Americans | 1 – 0 | Maine Nordiques | Rochester Ice Center |
| No scoring | | First period | No scoring |
| No scoring | | Second period | No scoring |
| 2:07 - Jaden Dyke (4) | | Third period | No scoring |
| Jensen Carlstrom | | Goalie stats | Carter Richardson |

| May 9 | Maine Nordiques | 2 – 7 | Rochester Jr. Americans | The Colisée |
| No scoring | | First period | Ryan Shaw (4) - 5:31; Keanan Dewberry (1) - 11:34 |
| 11:30 - sh - Ocean Fancy (2) | | Second period | Clay O'Donnell (3) - pp - 2:57; Ryan Shaw (5) - 4:35; Calle Karlsson (5) - pp - 10:43; Hugo Branthsson (1) - pp - 13:08 |
| 9:14 - sh - Cole Estey (2) | | Third period | Calle Karlsson (6) - pp - 9:01 |
| Carter Richardson; Matthew DellaRusso | | Goalie stats | Jensen Carlstrom |

| May 10 | Maine Nordiques | 2 – 3 | OT | Rochester Jr. Americans | The Colisée |
| 6:00 - Shane Kozlina (2); 13:14 - Joseph Gasperko (1) | | First period | | No scoring |
| No scoring | | Second period | | Jayden Dyke (5) - 3:14 |
| No scoring | | Third period | | Ryan Shaw (6) - 10:43 |
| No scoring | | First overtime period | | Ryan Shaw (7) - 2:39 |
| Carter Richardson | | Goalie stats | | Jensen Carlstrom |

| Rochester wins series 3 – 1 |

=== Midwest Division ===
==== (MW1) Wisconsin Windigo vs. (MW3) Anchorage Wolverines ====
| May 2 | Wisconsin Windigo | 5 – 2 | Anchorage Wolverines | Eagle River Sports Arena |
| 15:10 - Braydon Beahm (3) | | First period | Daniel Bagnole (2) - 5:18; Aaron Van Wie (2) - 16:31 |
| 5:30 - Ronnie Hill (2); 16:23 - Ronnie Hill (3) | | Second period | No scoring |
| 12:27 - Wyatt Herres (2); 15:04 - sh - Ronnie Hill (4) | | Third period | No scoring |
| Lucas Szyska | | Goalie stats | Michael Manzi |

| May 3 | Wisconsin Windigo | 1 – 2 | OT | Anchorage Wolverines | Eagle River Sports Arena |
| 1:51 - Braydon Beahm (4) | | First period | | No scoring |
| No scoring | | Second period | | No scoring |
| No scoring | | Third period | | Tai Ushio (2) - 16:11 |
| No scoring | | First overtime period | | Daniel Bagnole (4) - 13:39 |
| Lucas Szyska | | Goalie stats | | Beau Altman |

| May 4 | Wisconsin Windigo | 4 – 0 | Anchorage Wolverines | Eagle River Sports Arena |
| Teddy Richardson (2) - 15:43 | | First period | No scoring |
| Logan Nickolaus (3) - 1:07; Zachary Cline (3) - 8:07; Hunter Hayes (5) - pp - 17:08 | | Second period | No scoring |
| No scoring | | Third period | No scoring |
| Beau Altman | | Goalie stats | Michael Manzi |

| May 9 | Anchorage Wolverines | 4 – 2 | Wisconsin Windigo | Sullivan Arena |
| No scoring | | First period | No scoring |
| 0:31 - Aaron Van Wie (3); 14:38 - Andrew Karkoc (1); 15:57 - Toby Carlson (2) | | Second period | Luke Baker (1) - 11:51 |
| 5:16 - Brock Devlin (1) | | Third period | Hunter Hayes (3) - en' - 17:59 |
| Michael Manzi | | Goalie stats | Beau Altman |

| May 10 | Anchorage Wolverines | 1 – 2 | Wisconsin Windigo | Sullivan Arena |
| Romulus Riego de Dios (1) - 18:22 | | First period | 9:12 - Hunter Hayes (4); 12:23 - Rio Treharne (1) |
| No scoring | | Second period | No scoring |
| No scoring | | Third period | No scoring |
| Michael Manzi | | Goalie stats | Beau Altman |

| Wisconsin wins series 3 – 2 |

=== South Division ===
==== (S1) Lone Star Brahmas vs. (S3) Corpus Christi IceRays ====
| May 2 | Lone Star Brahmas | 1 – 0 | OT | Corpus Christi IceRays | NYTEX Sports Centre |
| No scoring | | First period | | No scoring |
| No scoring | | Second period | | No scoring |
| No scoring | | Third period | | No scoring |
| 10:23 - Cooper Faughnan (1) | | First overtime period | | No scoring |
| Ryan Cameron | | Goalie stats | | Benji Motew |

| May 3 | Lone Star Brahmas | 3 – 2 | Corpus Christi IceRays | NYTEX Sports Centre |
| No scoring | | First period | Michael Valdez (3) - 0:28 |
| 1:08 - Cooper Faughnan (2); 1:34 - Maddox Tulacro (1) | | Second period | Pierson Sobush (3) - 18:55 |
| 3:01 - Elias Kumlin (2) | | Third period | No scoring |
| Ryan Cameron | | Goalie stats | Benji Motew |

| May 8 | Corpus Christi IceRays | 0 – 5 | Lone Star Brahmas | El Paso County Events Center |
| No scoring | | First period | Emerson Marshall (1) - 6:09; Kristo Pitkänen (1) - 6:34; Saxton Tess (5) - sh - 15:17 |
| No scoring | | Second period | Cooper Faughnan (3) - 3:41; Christian Venticinque (4) - 11:33 |
| No scoring | | Third period | No scoring |
| Benji Motew | | Goalie stats | Ryan Cameron |

| Lone Star wins series 3 – 0 |

== Semifinals ==
=== (C1) Bismarck Bobcats vs. (E1) Rochester Jr. Americans ===
| May 16 | Bismarck Bobcats | 1 – 2 | Rochester Jr. Americans | Fogerty Ice Arena |
| No scoring | | First period | No scoring |
| No scoring | | Second period | Adam Gionta (1) - pp - 5:16 |
| 14:29 - Joshua Lehto (4) | | Third period | Hugo Branthsson (2) - 6:04 |
| Tomas Anderson | | Goalie stats | Danick Leroux |

| May 17 | Rochester Jr. Americans | 2 – 3 | Bismarck Bobcats | Fogerty Ice Arena |
| No scoring | | First period | No scoring |
| Owen King (2) - pp - 8:21; Adam Gionta (2) - pp - 14:13 | | Second period | 2:32 - Louie Kamienski (3); 4:03 - pp - Evan Hunter (1); 12:29 - pp - Tommy Cronin (2) |
| No scoring | | Third period | No scoring |
| Danick Leroux | | Goalie stats | Tomas Anderson |

| May 18 | Bismarck Bobcats | 2 – 1 | OT | Rochester Jr. Americans | Fogerty Ice Arena |
| No scoring | | First period | | No scoring |
| Keanu Krenn (6) - 1:27 | | Second period | | 4:12 - Owen King (3) |
| No scoring | | Third period | | No scoring |
| Julian Beaumont (3) - 10:07 | | First overtime period | | No scoring |
| Tomas Anderson | | Goalie stats | | Danick Leroux |

| Bismarck wins series 2 – 1 |

=== (S1) Lone Star Brahmas vs. (MW1) Wisconsin Windigo ===
| May 16 | Lone Star Brahmas | 0 – 3 | Wisconsin Windigo | Fogerty Ice Arena |
| No scoring | | First period | Alexios Georgaklis (2) - pp - 15:54 |
| No scoring | | Second period | Harper Frey (2) - 9:10 |
| No scoring | | Third period | Teddy Richardson (3) - 17:39 |
| Ryan Cameron | | Goalie stats | Lucas Szyszka |

| May 17 | Wisconsin Windigo | 3 – 6 | Lone Star Brahmas | Fogerty Ice Arena |
| No scoring | | First period | 0:59 - Christian Venticinque (5); 13:34 - Maddox Tulacro (2) |
| Harper Frey (3) - 19:06 | | Second period | 7:34 - sh - Ryan Comishock (1); 19:59 - pp - Ryan Comishock (2) |
| Zachary Cline (4) - pp - 1:25; Teddy Richardson (4) - 7:44 | | Third period | 15:01 - Christian Venticinque (6); 17:53 - sh - en - Zach Rizzo (2) |
| Beau Altman | | Goalie stats | Ryan Cameron |

| May 18 | Lone Star Brahmas | 5 – 4 | OT | Wisconsin Windigo | Fogerty Ice Arena |
| Kristo Pitkänen (2) - 5:57; Saxton Tess (6) - pp - 10:06 | | First period | | No scoring |
| No scoring | | Second period | | 4:33 - Hunter Hayes (5); 12:19 - pp - Hunter Hayes (6); 17:26 - pp - Braydon Beahm (5) |
| Saxton Tess (7) - 6:12; Charlie Emmons (1) - pp - 6:38 | | Third period | | No scoring |
| Cooper Faughnan (4) - 2:41 | | First overtime period | | No scoring |
| Ryan Cameron | | Goalie stats | | Beau Altman |

| Lone Star wins series 2 – 1 |

== Robertson Cup Finals ==
=== (C1) Bismarck Bobcats vs. (S1) Lone Star Brahmas ===
| May 20 | Bismarck Bobcats | 4 – 2 | Lone Star Brahmas | Fogerty Ice Arena |
| 18:51 - Alexander Kim (4) | | First period | Kyle Isenberg (1) - sh - 13:02 |
| 2:31 - Calle Arvedson (1); 14:31 - Joshua Lehto (5) | | Second period | No scoring |
| 6:39 - pp - Tommy Cronin (3) | | Third period | Ryan Comishock (3) - pp - 1:57 |
| Tomas Anderson (28 saves / 30 shots) | | Goalie stats | Ryan Cameron (31 saves / 35 shots) |

== Playoff scoring leaders ==
Note: GP = Games played; G = Goals; A = Assists; PTS = Points; PIM = Penalty minutes

| Player | Team | GP | G | A | PTS | PIM |
|---|---|---|---|---|---|---|
| Calle Karlsson | Rochester Jr. Americans | 12 | 6 | 8 | 14 | 0 |
| Ryan Shaw | Rochester Jr. Americans | 12 | 7 | 6 | 13 | 10 |
| Hunter Hayes | Wisconsin Windigo | 12 | 7 | 6 | 13 | 6 |
| Teddy Richardson | Wisconsin Windigo | 12 | 4 | 9 | 13 | 10 |
| Tommy Cronin | Bismarck Bobcats | 13 | 3 | 10 | 13 | 4 |
| Saxton Tess | Lone Star Brahmas | 10 | 7 | 5 | 12 | 4 |
| Zachary Cline | Wisconsin Windigo | 12 | 4 | 7 | 11 | 6 |
| Julian Beaumont | Bismarck Bobcats | 13 | 3 | 8 | 11 | 12 |
| Kristo Pitkänen | Lone Star Brahmas | 10 | 2 | 8 | 10 | 4 |
| Braydon Beahm | Wisconsin Windigo | 12 | 5 | 4 | 9 | 4 |
| Dylan Shane | Johnstown Tomahawks | 7 | 2 | 7 | 9 | 0 |
| Shane Kozlina | Maine Nordiques | 11 | 2 | 7 | 9 | 20 |
| Liam Chapman | Rochester Jr. Americans | 12 | 0 | 9 | 9 | 6 |

== Playoff leading goaltenders ==
Note: GP = Games played; MIN = Minutes played; W = Wins; L = Losses; SO = Shutouts; GA = Goals Allowed; GAA = Goals against average; SV% = Save percentage

| Player | Team | GP | MIN | W | L | SO | GA | GAA | SV% |
|---|---|---|---|---|---|---|---|---|---|
| Benji Motew | Corpus Christi IceRays | 8 | 549 | 5 | 3 | 1 | 15 | 1.64 | 0.949 |
| Ryan Cameron | Lone Star Brahmas | 10 | 610 | 8 | 2 | 3 | 17 | 1.67 | 0.939 |
| Carter Richardson | Maine Nordiques | 11 | 622 | 6 | 4 | 2 | 18 | 1.74 | 0.948 |
| Tomas Anderson | Bismarck Bobcats | 13 | 820 | 9 | 4 | 1 | 24 | 1.76 | 0.935 |
| Nikola Goich | Shreveport Mudbugs | 3 | 233 | 0 | 3 | 0 | 7 | 1.80 | 0.936 |
