= Jerry D'Amigo =

American ice hockey player (born 1991)

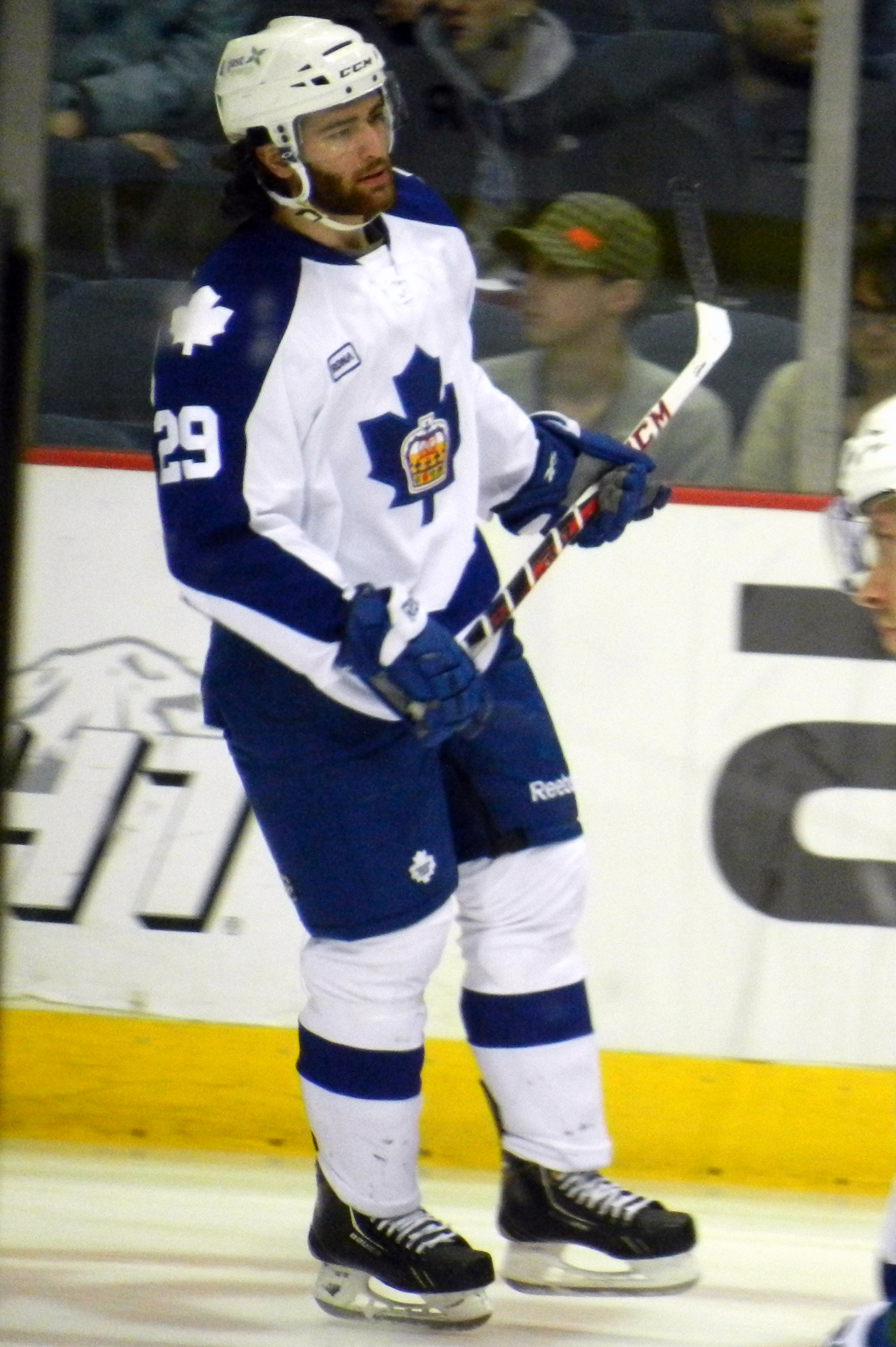
- Born: February 19, 1991 (age 35) Binghamton, New York, U.S.
- Height: 5 ft 11 in (180 cm)
- Weight: 210 lb (95 kg; 15 st 0 lb)
- Position: Right wing
- Shot: Left
- Played for: Toronto Maple Leafs; Buffalo Sabres; Ilves; KalPa; ERC Ingolstadt; Düsseldorfer EG; Löwen Frankfurt; HK 32 Liptovský Mikuláš
- NHL draft: 158th overall, 2009; Toronto Maple Leafs
- Playing career: 2010–2025

Jerry Vincent D'Amigo (born February 19, 1991) is an American former professional ice hockey right winger. He is currently an assistant coach for the Elmira Aviators of the NAHL. He most recently played for HK 32 Liptovský Mikuláš in the Slovak Extraliga. D'Amigo was drafted by the Toronto Maple Leafs in the sixth round, 158th overall, of the 2009 NHL entry draft.

== Playing career ==
=== Amateur ===
D'Amigo graduated from Johnson City High School in 2009 in Johnson City, New York, prior to attending college. D'Amigo played college ice hockey for Rensselaer Polytechnic Institute (RPI) of the ECAC conference in the NCAA. He finished fifth nationally in points per game by a rookie (0.97), led RPI in game-winning goals and finished second on the team in short-handed goals. In his single season in the NCAA, he won the ECAC Rookie of the Year award and was also named to the ECAC Rookie Team.

=== Professional ===
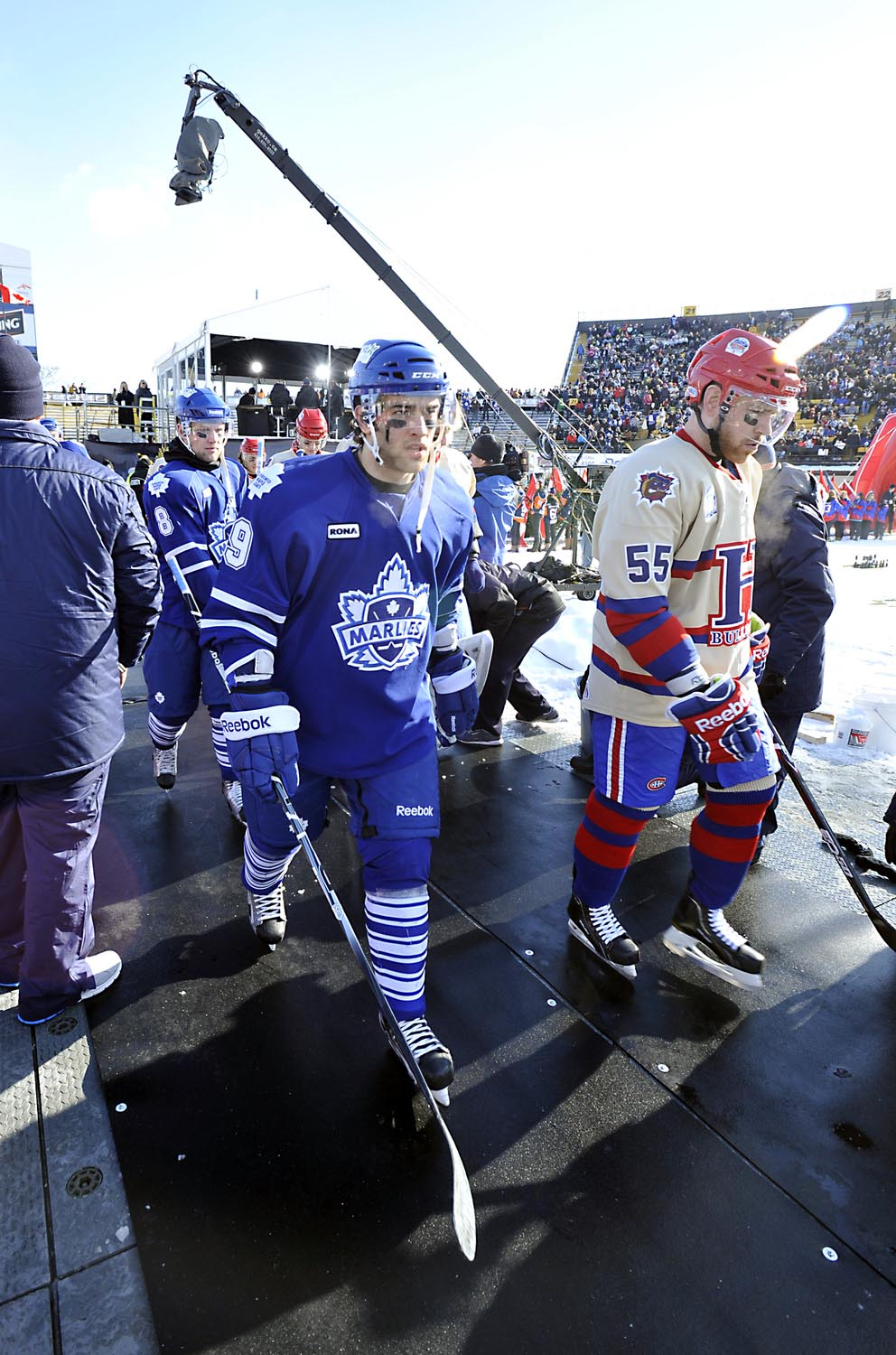
D'Amigo during his tenure with the Marlies.

D'Amigo was selected in the sixth round, 158th overall of the 2009 NHL entry draft by the Toronto Maple Leafs. On August 11, 2010, D'Amigo signed a three-year, National Hockey League (NHL) entry-level contract with Maple Leafs. Due to his contract status with the Maple Leafs, D'Amigo was not allowed to return to the NCAA. D'Amigo attended Maple Leafs training camp ahead of the 2010–11 season, with Toronto having the option to keep him on their NHL roster or assign him to either the American Hockey League (AHL) or to the Ontario Hockey League (OHL)'s Kitchener Rangers, who owned his major junior playing rights. He was ultimately sent to the Toronto Marlies, the Maple Leafs AHL affiliate with the open option to send him to Kitchener prior to February 10, 2011, an option the Maple Leafs eventually exercised just prior to the deadline. Before his assignment to the OHL, he had recorded 14 points in 41 games played with the Marlies. With Kitchener, he finished the 2010–11 OHL season with 12 goals and 16 assists (28 points) in just 21 games played.

The following season, D'Amigo again attended the Maple Leafs training camp, but was cut and sent to the Marlies. He was a key checking forward for the Marlies that season, playing on the team's penalty kill unit. He was cut after only five days at the 2013 Maple Leafs training camp and was assigned to the Marlies. In the 2013–14 season, D'Amigo was named an alternate captain for the Marlies while playing at home in Toronto. On December 5, 2013, D'Amigo was called up to the Maple Leafs for the first time in his career, later making his NHL debut 3–2 Toronto win over the Dallas Stars. On December 14, D'Amigo scored his first career NHL goal against Antti Raanta of the Chicago Blackhawks, also registering his first career NHL assist in the game. D'Amigo played in 22 games registering the one goal and three points.

On July 1, 2014, D'Amigo, along with a conditional seventh-round pick in the 2015 NHL entry draft, was traded to the Columbus Blue Jackets in exchange for former Maple Leaf Matt Frattin. D'Amigo and the Blue Jackets agreed to terms on a one-year, two-way contract on July 29, though he never played for Columbus at the NHL level during his brief tenure with the organization. Later that same year, on December 16, D'Amigo was traded to the Buffalo Sabres in exchange for forward Luke Adam. D'Amigo made his debut with the Sabres on March 3, 2015, against the Tampa Bay Lightning. He split the 2014–15 season in the AHL between the Springfield Falcons and Rochester Americans, scoring 9 goals and 26 points. On July 23, 2015, D'Amigo signed a one-year, two-way contract with the Sabres. D'Amigo spent the 2015–16 season with Rochester.

He was unable to attract an NHL contract as a free agent, D'Amigo ventured to Finland for the following season, signing with Ilves of the country's top-flight Liiga on October 16, 2016. In his first season abroad, D'Amigo quickly transitioned to the European style game in the 2016–17 campaign, contributing with 13 goals and 33 points in 48 regular season games and adding 1 point in 10 playoff games. Following Ilves postseason exit, D'Amigo left the club as a free agent. Without a contract over the summer, he belatedly opted to continue in Finland, agreeing to a one-year contract with KalPa on October 12, 2017, for the 2017–18 season.

After two seasons in Finland, D'Amigo left as free agent to sign a one-year deal with German outfit, ERC Ingolstadt of the Deutsche Eishockey Liga (DEL) on July 17, 2018. D'Amigo finished the season with 18 goals and 43 points in 52 games. He re-signed the following off-season for a second season with Ingolstadt. In his second season D'Amigo registered 9 goals and 22 points in 41 games.

Returning to North America, D'Amigo signed as a free agent to join the Orlando Solar Bears of the ECHL on December 7, 2020. In the 2020–21 season, D'Amigo played in 14 games with the Solar Bears before he returned to the AHL in signing a professional tryout contract (PTO) with the Colorado Eagles on February 8, 2021. He made 3 regular season appearances with the Eagles, registering 7 penalty minutes, before he was released from his PTO and returned to the Solar Bears on February 23, 2021.

As a free agent following the season, D'Amigo returned for a second stint in Germany, agreeing to a one-year contract with Düsseldorfer EG of the DEL on August 4, 2021. D'Amigo collected 9 goals and 25 points in 53 games. He signed as a free agent with Löwen Frankfurt of the DEL on November 7, 2022. In his fourth season in the DEL in 2022–23 season, D'Amigo helped Frankfurt in their first season in the top tier by recording 4 goals and 14 points through 38 regular season games. Following their defeat in the playoff qualifiers to former club Düsseldorfer EG, D'Amigo left Löwen Frankfurt at the conclusion of his contract on March 19, 2023.

On November 26, 2024, D'Amigo signed with the Slovak Extraliga team HK 32 Liptovský Mikuláš. On January 11, 2025, he departed the Slovak team and became an assistant coach with the Elmira Aviators of the North American Hockey League the following day on January 12, 2025.

== International play ==
Medal record

Representing (United States) USA

Ice hockey

World Junior Championships
Bronze medal – third place	2011 USA	
Gold medal – first place	2010 Canada	

IIHF World U18 Championships
Gold medal – first place	2009 USA	

D'Amigo represented the under-18 United States team for the first time in his career at the 2009 IIHF World U18 Championships, where he helped them win the gold medal and led Team USA in scoring; he was also fifth overall in tournament scoring, with 13 points. He represented the United States at the junior level at the 2010 World Junior Ice Hockey Championships, where he won gold and finished fourth in tournament scoring, with 12 points. He represented the U.S. at the junior level once again at the 2011 World Junior Ice Hockey Championships, where he won bronze and finished with two points scored.

== Career statistics ==
=== Regular season and playoffs ===
			Regular season					Playoffs
Season	Team	League	GP	G	A	Pts	PIM	GP	G	A	Pts	PIM
2006–07	Binghamton Jr. Senators	AtJHL	41	17	16	33	42	3	0	1	1	0
2007–08	U.S. National Under-18 Team	NAHL	44	5	12	17	58	3	1	1	2	6
2008–09	U.S. National Under-18 Team	Ind.	53	23	33	56	61	—	—	—	—	—
2008–09	U.S. National Under-18 Team	NAHL	11	8	6	14	4	—	—	—	—	—
2009–10	Rensselaer Polytechnic Institute	ECAC	35	10	24	34	37	—	—	—	—	—
2010–11	Toronto Marlies	AHL	43	5	10	15	23	—	—	—	—	—
2010–11	Kitchener Rangers	OHL	21	12	16	28	12	7	6	3	9	0
2011–12	Toronto Marlies	AHL	76	15	26	41	39	17	8	5	13	12
2012–13	Toronto Marlies	AHL	70	17	12	29	40	9	1	8	9	10
2013–14	Toronto Marlies	AHL	51	20	13	33	17	14	6	8	14	8
2013–14	Toronto Maple Leafs	NHL	22	1	2	3	0	—	—	—	—	—
2014–15	Springfield Falcons	AHL	28	3	4	7	26	—	—	—	—	—
2014–15	Rochester Americans	AHL	31	6	13	19	21	—	—	—	—	—
2014–15	Buffalo Sabres	NHL	9	0	0	0	2	—	—	—	—	—
2015–16	Rochester Americans	AHL	59	12	12	24	42	—	—	—	—	—
2016–17	Ilves	Liiga	48	13	20	33	47	10	0	1	1	2
2017–18	KalPa	Liiga	38	6	11	17	20	6	2	1	3	25
2018–19	ERC Ingolstadt	DEL	52	18	25	43	30	7	2	0	2	0
2019–20	ERC Ingolstadt	DEL	41	9	13	22	34	—	—	—	—	—
2020–21	Orlando Solar Bears	ECHL	52	10	16	26	14	—	—	—	—	—
2020–21	Colorado Eagles	AHL	3	0	0	0	7	—	—	—	—	—
2021–22	Düsseldorfer EG	DEL	46	7	12	19	25	7	2	4	6	6
2022–23	Löwen Frankfurt	DEL	38	4	10	14	16	2	0	0	0	0
2023–24	Jacksonville Icemen	ECHL	44	8	18	26	31	7	1	1	2	0
2024–25	HK 32 Liptovský Mikuláš	Slovak	3	0	1	1	0	—	—	—	—	—
NHL totals			31	1	2	3	2	—	—	—	—	—

=== International ===
Year	Team	Event	Result	GP	G	A	Pts	PIM
2009	United States	WJC18	1st place, gold medalist(s)	7	4	9	13	8
2010	United States	WJC	1st place, gold medalist(s)	7	6	6	12	0
2011	United States	WJC	3rd place, bronze medalist(s)	6	1	1	2	2
Junior totals				20	11	16	27	10

== Awards and honors ==
Award	Year
AtJHL
Rookie of the Year	2007
College
ECAC All-Rookie Team	2010
ECAC Rookie of the Year	2010
ECAC All-Academic Team	2010
International
WJC18 First Team All-Star	2009

Awards and achievements
Preceded by Jody O'Neill	ECAC Hockey Rookie of the Year; 2009–10	Succeeded by Andrew Calof
