= New Hampshire Mountain Kings =

- City: Hooksett, New Hampshire
- League: NAHL
- Division: East
- Founded: 2023
- Home arena: Tri-Town Ice Arena
- Colors: Blue, light blue, white
- Head coach: Cam Robichaud
- Affiliates: New Hampshire Jr. Mountain Kings

Franchise history
- 2023–present: New Hampshire Mountain Kings

The New Hampshire Mountain Kings are a Tier II junior ice hockey team playing in the North American Hockey League. The Mountain Kings play their home games in the Delta Dental Arena in Hooksett, New Hampshire.

== History ==
In 2023, after a group of local investors purchased the Delta Dental Arena (Previously Tri-Town Ice Arena), the NAHL announced that they had accepted the New Hampshire Mountain Kings as a new expansion franchise. About a month later, the team selected Cam Robichaud to be their first head coach. The new bench boss quickly set about putting a team together and getting them ready for the inaugural game on September 13, 2023.

The Mountain Kings also have an affiliate team that plays in the NA3HL (Tier-III) called the New Hampshire Jr. Mountain Kings.

== Season-by-season records ==
Season	GP	W	L	OTL	SOL	Pts	GF	GA	Regular season finish	Playoffs
2023–24	60	20	35	5	0	45	148	214	8th of 9, East; 28th of 32, NAHL	Did Not Qualify
2024–25	59	27	29	2	1	57	201	210	6th of 10, East; 23rd of 35, NAHL	Lost Play-in series, 1–2 (Maine Nordiques)
2025–26	59	23	27	4	5	55	165	226	8th of 10, East; 25th of 34, NAHL	Did Not Qualify
