= Minnesota Mallards =

- City: Forest Lake, Minnesota
- League: North American Hockey League
- Division: Central
- Founded: 2024
- Home arena: Forest Lake Sports Center
- Colors: Maroon and Gold
- Owner: Charles Bailey
- General manager: Tyler Uravage (2025-interim)
- Head coach: Dr Westin Michaud (2025)

Franchise history
- 2024–present: Minnesota Mallards

The Minnesota Mallards are a Tier II junior ice hockey team located in Forest Lake, Minnesota, in the greater Minneapolis–Saint Paul area. The team is scheduled to begin play in the fall of 2024, as the 8th in the NAHL's Central Division. The Mallards are owned by Charles Bailey, and the team will be coached by Terry Watt.

== History ==
The NAHL approved the Minnesota Mallards as an expansion team in the spring of 2024. The Mallards were the second of two expansion teams added for the 2024–25, joining the Watertown Shamrocks, and would be the fourth NAHL club based out of Minnesota at the time of their start. The club will be the NAHL's return to the region after the departure of the Minnesota Magicians in 2022.

== Season-by-season records ==
Season	GP	W	L	OTL	SOL	PTS	GF	GA	PIM	Finish	Playoffs
Minnesota Mallards of the NAHL
2024–25	57	10	43	2	2	24	119	265	931	8th of 8, Central; 35th of 35, NAHL	Did not qualify
2025–26	59	11	42	4	2	28	147	280	1044	8th of 8, Central; 33rd of 34, NAHL	Did not qualify
