= Forest Lake Sports Center =

Ice hockey venue in Minnesota, United States

- Interactive map of Forest Lake Sports Center
- Location: 5530 206th Street North; Forest Lake, MN 55025
- Coordinates: 45.24588°N 92.9943°W
- Owner: Forest Lake Area Schools
- Operator: Forest Lake Area Schools
- Capacity: 800 (Ice Hockey)
- Surface: Ice

Construction
- Opened: 2008

Tenants
- Minnesota Mullets (USPHL) (2017–2019); Minnesota Mallards (NAHL) (2024–present)

The Forest Lake Sports Center is a 800-seat multi-rink arena located in Forest Lake, Minnesota. Owned and operated by the Forest Lake Area Schools, the rink also serves as home for local junior ice hockey teams.
