= Billings Cattle Punchers =

- City: Billings, Montana
- League: North American Hockey League
- Division: Mountain
- Founded: 2026
- Home arena: Signal Peak Energy Arena
- Colors: Green, red, black, and cream

Franchise history
- 2026–present: Billings Cattle Punchers

The Billings Cattle Punchers are a Tier II junior ice hockey team in the North American Hockey League's (NAHL) Mountain Division, and set to begin play for the 2026-27 season. The Cattle Punchers will play their home games at Signal Peak Energy Arena in Billings, Montana.

== History ==
On April 16, 2026, the Cattle Punchers name, colors, logo, and brand were unveiled, nearly six months after the creation of a new Junior hockey team was announced in Billings. It was originally announced that the team would debut in the Tier III United States Premier Hockey League’s National Collegiate Development Conference (NCDC).

On June 12, 2026, it was announced that the Cattle Punchers would forego the NCDC and instead join the Tier II North American Hockey League for the 2026-27 season as one of five charter teams in the NAHL’s newly created Mountain Division.

The team will begin play in the 2026-27 season at the brand new Signal Peak Energy Arena, which has a capacity of 1,200 fixed-back seats, along with table-top and drink rail areas overlooking the ends of the ice, corporate suites, dedicated ADA compliant seating areas, and standing room-only (general admission) that together can accommodate an additional 800 spectators for a total capacity of 2,000.

The Cattle Punchers are the first junior ice hockey team to call Billings home since the Billings Bulls folded in 2017.
