= Colorado Grit =

- City: Greeley, Colorado, USA
- League: North American Hockey League
- Division: South Division
- Founded: 2023
- Dissolved: 2025
- Home arena: Greeley Ice Haus
- Colors: Black, Gold
- Owners: Colorado Sports Partners, LLC. Bob Bowden and David Clarkson
- Head coach: Kevin Holmstrom

Franchise history
- 2023–2025: Colorado Grit

The Colorado Grit were a Tier II Junior ice hockey team from Greeley, Colorado. The franchise began in 2023 as an expansion franchise in the North American Hockey League.

== History ==
In January 2023, the NAHL approved the Colorado Grit as an expansion franchise. The Grit's initial ownership group was the same one that ran the Northern Colorado Eagles (a Tier III junior team). The Northern Colorado Eagles ceased operations after the 2022-23 season and transitioned fully to the Colorado Grit. In May of 2025, after losing access to their home arena, the NAHL agreed to grant the Colorado Grit inactive status for the 2025–26 season.

== Season-by-season records ==
Season	GP	W	L	OTL	SOL	P	GF	GA	Regular season finish	Playoffs
Colorado Grit of the NAHL
2023–24	60	12	41	5	2	31	142	248	9th of 9, South; 32nd of 32, NAHL	Did not qualify
2024–25	59	23	24	8	4	58	154	190	6th of 9, South; 22nd of 35, NAHL	Lost Play-in Rd, 0-2 (Corpus Christi IceRays)
