= Dave Torrey Arena =

Multipurpose arena in St. Cloud, Minnesota

Coordinates: 45°34′9″N 94°13′17″W

Dave Torrey Arena is a 2,000-seat multipurpose arena located in St. Cloud, Minnesota. It is used primarily for ice hockey, and is home to high school hockey teams. It was built in 1972.

Most of the arena's seating, restrooms, concession stands, meeting and office rooms and a 3,000-square-foot (280 m^{2}) mezzanine are the products of the 1994 renovations. A new heating and cooling system was installed in 2008. A new scoreboard was installed in 2025.

Adjacent is the 400-seat Ritsche Arena.
