= Woodman's Center =

Planned indoor arena in Wisconsin, USA

Woodman's Sports & Convention Center
- Woodman's Center
- Interactive map of Woodman's Sports & Convention Center
- Location: Janesville, Wisconsin
- Coordinates: 42.7130°N 89.0013°W
- Owner: City of Janesville
- Operator: Sports Facility Management
- Capacity: 1,500 (hockey); 250 (multi-purpose arena)

Construction
- Groundbreaking: February 20, 2024
- Opened: Summer 2025 (planned)
- Cost: $47 million
- Architects: Zimmerman Architectural Studios, Inc.
- Project manager: Sabrina Bowerman
- General contractors: JP Cullen & Sons

Tenant
- Janesville Jets (NAHL) (2025–)

Website
- https://www.woodmanscenter.com/

The Woodman's Sports & Convention Center (Woodman's Center) is a 140,000-square-foot indoor arena in Janesville, Wisconsin. Opened in September 2025, the Woodman's Center was built on the site of a former Sears store in the Uptown Janesville Mall using a public-private partnership model.

The center includes a 1,500-seat permanent ice arena, which is the new home of the Janesville Jets of the North American Hockey League and the Beloit College ice hockey team. The center also includes a 250-seat multi-purpose arena; basketball, volleyball, and pickleball courts; and a 25,800-square-foot conference center.

Naming rights were purchased by Janesville-based supermarket chain Woodman's Markets, in a 20-year deal that activated in July of 2025.
