= New Hampshire Jr. Mountain Kings =

- City: Hooksett, New Hampshire
- League: NA3HL
- Division: East
- Founded: 2023
- Home arena: Tri-Town Ice Arena
- Colors: Blue, light blue, white
- Owners: New Hampshire Hockey Club, LLC,
- General manager: Clint Edinger
- Head coach: Clint Cassavaugh
- Affiliates: New Hampshire Mountain Kings

Franchise history
- 2023–present: New Hampshire Jr. Mountain Kings

The New Hampshire Jr. Mountain Kings are a Tier III junior ice hockey team playing in the North American 3 Hockey League. The Mountain Kings play their home games in the Tri-Town Ice Arena in Hooksett, New Hampshire.

== History ==
In 2023, after a group of local investors purchased the Tri-Town Ice Arena, the NAHL announced that they had accepted the New Hampshire Mountain Kings as a new expansion franchise. At the same time, the Mountain Kings founded a (Tier-III) affiliate that would begin play in the NA3HL for the same season called the New Hampshire Jr. Mountain Kings.

== Season-by-season records ==
Season	GP	W	L	OTL	SOL	Pts	GF	GA	Regular season finish	Playoffs
2023–24	47	21	21	4	1	47	136	138	4th in East	Lost Div. Semifinal series, 0–2 (Northeast Generals)
2024–25	47	25	19	2	1	53	149	141	4th of 7 East; 19th of 34 NA3HL	Lost Div. Semifinal series, 0–2 (Binghamton Buzz)
2025–26	47	25	16	4	2	56	174	149	2nd of 6 East; 16th of 38 NA3HL	Won Div. Semifinal series, 2-0 (Binghamton Buzz); Lost Div Finals 0-2 (Long Beach Sharks)
