= Elmira Aviators =

- City: Elmira, New York
- League: North American Hockey League
- Division: East
- Founded: 2024
- Home arena: LECOM Event Center
- Colors: Purple, Silver, Black, White
- Owner: Marc Stemerman
- General manager: Eddy Lowe
- Head coach: Leeor Shtrom
- Media: Mac Young (play-by-play NAHLTV
- Affiliates: Binghamton Buzz (NA3HL)

Franchise history
- 2024 – Present: Elmira Aviators

The Elmira Aviators are a Tier II junior ice hockey team in the North American Hockey League's East Division. The Aviators play their home games at the LECOM Event Center in Elmira, New York.

== Regular season records ==
Season	GP	W	L	OTL	SOL	PTS	GF	GA	Finish	Playoffs
2024–25	59	21	34	3	1	46	157	228	9th of 10, East; 29th of 35, NAHL	Did Not Qualify
2025–26	59	22	28	5	4	53	159	221	9th of 10, East; 27th of 34, NAHL	Did Not Qualify
