= Grand Junction River Hawks =

- City: Grand Junction, Colorado
- League: North American Hockey League
- Division: Mountain
- Founded: 2025
- Home arena: River City Sportplex
- Colors: Green, black, and white
- General manager: Darren Naylor
- Head coach: Dustin Timm

Franchise history
- 2025–present: Grand Junction River Hawks

The Grand Junction River Hawks are a Tier II junior ice hockey team playing in the North American Hockey League (NAHL). The River Hawks play their home games at River City Sportplex in Grand Junction, Colorado.

Before joining the NAHL, the River Hawks played their inaugural season as a member of the United States Premier Hockey League (USPHL) and its National Collegiate Development Conference (NCDC).

== History ==
On February 6, 2025, the USPHL announced the addition of four teams to the NCDC (Tier II) division. This group included the Grand Junction River Hawks who would begin play the following season.

On June 12, 2026, it was announced that the River Hawks would leave the USPHL and NCDC to join the North American Hockey League for the 2026-27 season as one of five charter teams in its new Mountain Division.
