= Watertown Shamrocks =

- City: Watertown, South Dakota
- League: North American Hockey League
- Division: Central
- Founded: 2024
- Home arena: Prairie Lakes Ice Arena
- Colors: Green and white
- Owners: Codington County; Hockey Club LLC
- Head coach: Casey Kirley

Franchise history
- 2024–present: Watertown Shamrocks

The Watertown Shamrocks are a Tier II junior ice hockey team located in Watertown, South Dakota. The team began play in the fall of 2024, as the 7th in the NAHL's Central Division. The Shamrocks play out of the Prairie Lakes Ice Arena, a 1,500-seat venue that opened in February 2024.

== History ==
Shortly after the completion of the Prairie Lakes Ice Arena, the NAHL board of governors approved the addition of the Watertown Shamrocks as an expansion franchise. The team will be the second NAHL team located in South Dakota, after the Aberdeen Wings, with all other division foes being located in bordering states (Minnesota and North Dakota).

At their inaugural NAHL draft, the Shamrocks made Travis Lefere the team first round pick.

== Season-by-season records ==
Season	GP	W	L	OTL	SOL	PTS	GF	GA	PIM	Finish	Playoffs
Watertown Shamrocks of the NAHL
2024–25	59	19	33	2	5	45	141	197	1098	6th of 8, Central; 30th of 35, NAHL	Did Not Qualify
2025–26	59	31	23	3	2	67	195	194	874	4th of 8, Central; 16th of 34, NAHL	Lost Div. Semifinal series, 0–3 vs. Austin Bruins
