= Maysa Arena =

Venue located in Minot, North Dakota

MAYSA Arena
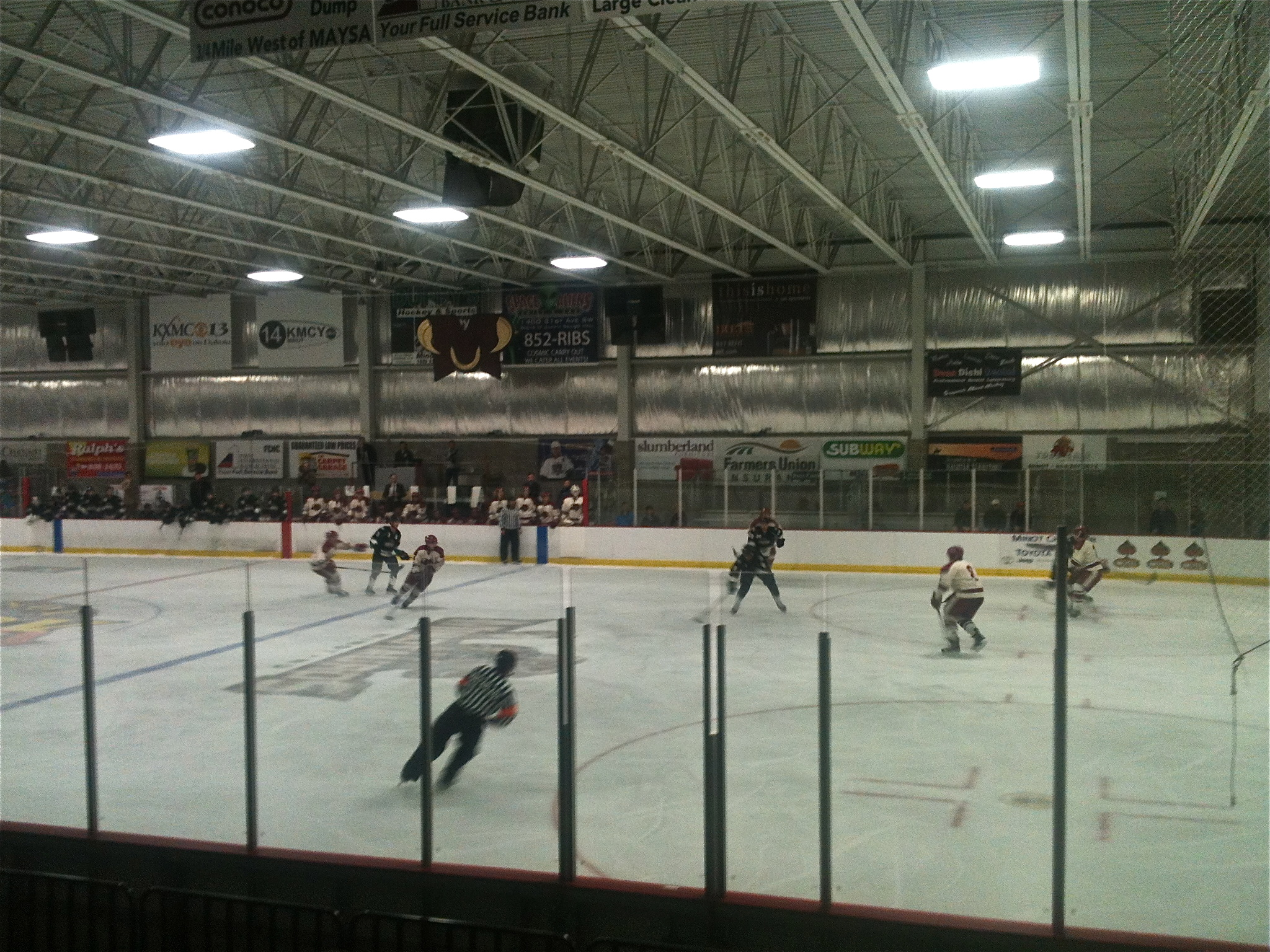
- Interactive map of MAYSA Arena
- Location: 2501 W Burdick Expy; Minot, ND 58701
- Coordinates: 48°13′09″N 101°19′51″W
- Owner: Minot Park District Foundation
- Operator: Minot Park District Foundation
- Capacity: 1,800
- Surface: Multi-surface

Construction
- Groundbreaking: 1999
- Opened: October 2000
- Expanded: 2016
- Cost: $3.9 million ($7.29 million in 2025 dollars)
- Architects: Torno, Nester & Davison, PC
- General contractors: Rolac Contracting, Inc.

Tenants
- Minot State Beavers (ACHA) (2000–present); Minot Minotauros (NAHL) (2011–present)

Maysa Arena is a multi-purpose venue located in Minot, North Dakota. The name Maysa is an acronym for Minot Area Youth Skating Association, a group that proposed the construction of the three-rink arena in the 1990s. The $3.9 million arena on the Burdick Expressway was opened in October 2000. The arena is home to the Minot Minotauros of the North American Hockey League and the Minot State Beavers men's ice hockey of the American Collegiate Hockey Association.

The arena added a third sheet of ice called Pepsi Rink which seats 1,800 with room for an additional 250 people. The plans had been developed since early 2012 before it finally was completed in November 2016. The expansion was estimated to cost between $5.5 million and $7 million but eventually ended up costing $10.9 million.
