= NYTEX Sports Centre =

Arena in North Richland Hills, Texas

Coordinates: 32.859901°N 97.196466°W

- Interactive map of NYTEX Sports Centre
- Former names: Blue Line Ice Complex (1999–2006)
- Location: 8851 Ice House Drive, North Richland Hills, TX
- Owner: NYTEX Sports LLC
- Capacity: 2,400 (NYTEX Sports Centre)

Construction
- Opened: 1999

Tenants
- Lone Star Brahmas (NAHL) (2013–present); Texas Jr. Brahmas (NA3HL) (2010–present); Dallas Derby Devils (WFTDA) (2008–present); Texas Tornado (NAHL) (1999–2003); Lone Star Cavalry (NAHL) (2003–2004); Texas/Fort Worth Brahmas (CHL) (2007–2013); Texas Outlaws (PASL) (2008–2009); Birdville Hawks (AT&T MHSHL) (2019-present); Keller Indians (AT&T MHSHL); Southlake Carroll Dragons (AT&T MHSHL) (2015-present)

The NYTEX Sports Centre is a 2,400-seat multi-purpose arena in North Richland Hills, Texas. It is home to the Lone Star Brahmas of the North American Hockey League and the Texas Jr. Brahmas in the North American 3 Hockey League. The facility was designed by architect Kent Holcomb and built in 1999 as the Blue Line Ice Complex before being renamed in June 2006. It is owned by NYTEX Sports, a management firm based in New York City and Texas.

== Notable events ==
The NYTEX Sports Centre was the site of the Blader Bash, one of the largest Beyblade tournaments ever organized. Hosted by Blast Zone Kid, the tournament attracted numerous Beyblade YouTubers including ilinnuc, Boltoms, and K1mbo. The event took place on June 22, 2019.

The arena also hosted pro wrestling shows from Major League Wrestling. Notably War Chamber 2019 on September 7, 2019, MLW Zero Hour 2020 on January 11, 2020, Kings of Colosseum 2025 and a taping of Reloaded 2025 on January 11, 2025, Fightland 2025 and a taping of Fury Road 2025 on September 13, 2025.

NYTEX Sports Centre also holds the most Ice Hockey National Championships in a single arena in the State of Texas with a total of 5

- Lone Star Brahmas (NAHL) 2 (2017, 2024)

- Texas Brahmas (NA3HL) 1 (2019)

- Texas Brahmas (CHL) 1 (2009)

- Texas Tornado (NAHL) 1 (2001)
