= V.F.W. Sports Center =

Ice arena in Bismarck, North Dakota

- Interactive map of V.F.W. Sports Center
- Former names: All-Seasons Sports Center
- Location: 1200 North Washington Street; Bismarck, ND 58501
- Coordinates: 46°49′15″N 100°47′41″W
- Owner: Bismarck Parks & Recreation
- Operator: Bismarck Parks & Recreation
- Capacity: Ice Hockey: 1,289
- Surface: 200' x 85'(hockey)

Construction
- Groundbreaking: 1985
- Opened: 1986

Tenant
- Bismarck Bobcats (NAHL) (1998–present)

The V.F.W. Sports Center is a multi purpose ice arena and recreational facility located in Bismarck, North Dakota owned and operated by the City of Bismarck Parks & Recreation Department. The ice arena serves as the home to the Bismarck Bobcats of the North American Hockey League The facility is also home to several local high school ice hockey teams, local figure skating and curling clubs, youth, and adult recreational ice hockey leagues, as well as public skating.

== History ==
The arena was formerly known as All-Seasons Sports Center and opened in 1986. A second sheet of ice was added in 1999.
