= Odde Ice Center =

Multipurpose arena in Aberdeen, South Dakota

Coordinates: 45.48860°N 98.50655°W

- Interactive map of Odde Ice Center
- Location: 400 24th Avenue NW; Aberdeen, SD 57401
- Owner: Aberdeen Hockey Association
- Operator: Aberdeen Hockey Association
- Capacity: 1,600 (Ice Hockey)
- Surface: Ice

Construction
- Opened: 1980

Tenant
- Aberdeen Wings (NAHL) (2010–present)

The Odde Ice Center is a 1,600-seat multipurpose arena located in Aberdeen, South Dakota on the Brown County Fairgrounds. Built in 1980, it is home to the Aberdeen Wings of the North American Hockey League.

Currently, expansion of the arena is underway on the arena's south side; it would include storage room for the rink boards, locker rooms for youth hockey teams, offices for the Wings, larger locker rooms for the Wings, an exercise/training room, and suites above the team benches which would expand the total capacity to 1,750. The expansion is set to be completed by September 2013.
