= Prairie Lakes Ice Arena =

Ice hockey venue in Watertown, South Dakota

Prairie Lakes Ice Arena is an ice hockey venue in Watertown, South Dakota. It is the home venue of the Watertown Shamrocks of the North American Hockey League. It opened in September 2024 at the cost of $36 million and has a seating capacity is 1,500.
