= Big Dipper Ice Arena =

Arena in Fairbanks, Alaska, United States

Coordinates: 64.830231°N 147.746416°W

- The Dipper
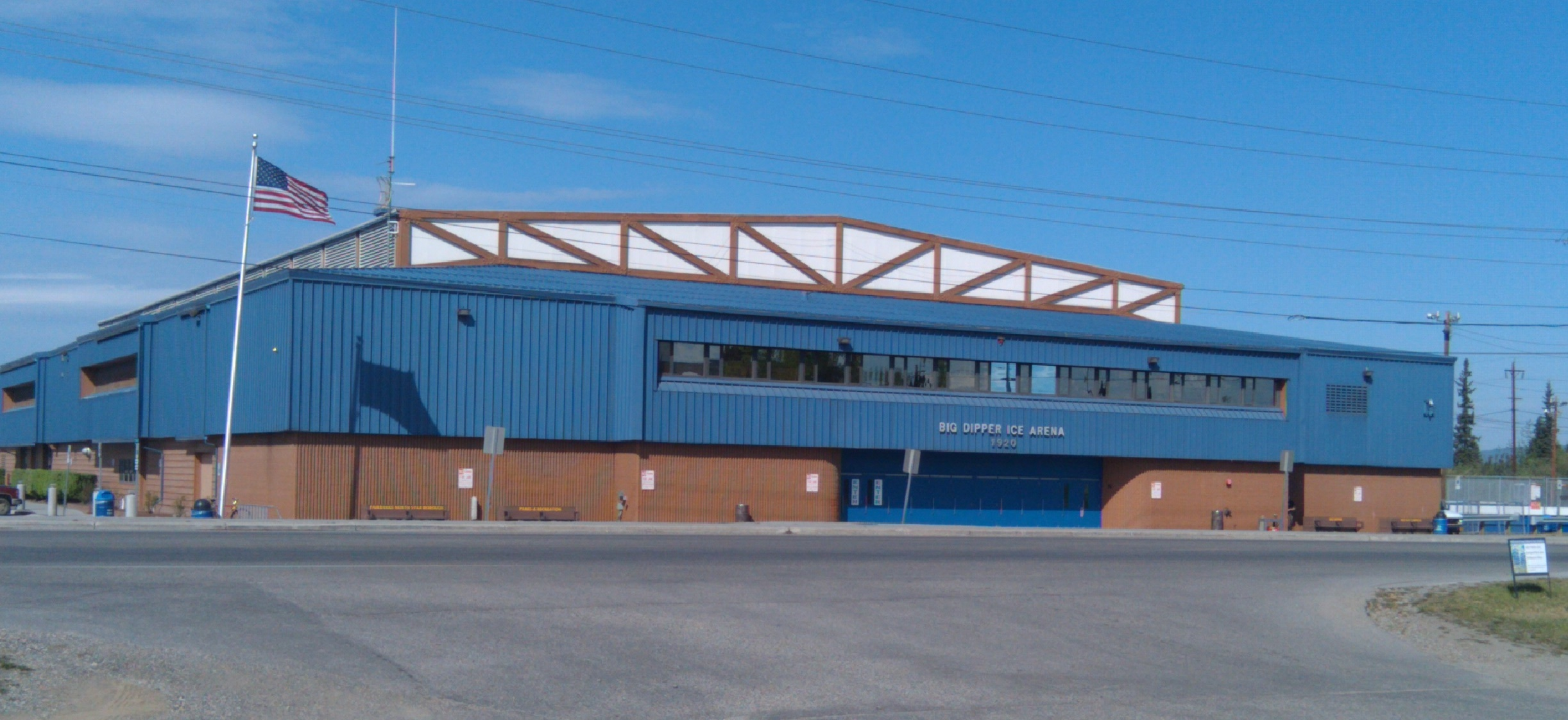
- Interactive map of Big Dipper Ice Arena
- Location: 1920 Lathrop Street, Fairbanks, Alaska 99701
- Owner: Fairbanks North Star Borough
- Operator: Fairbanks North Star Borough Department of Parks & Recreation
- Capacity: Seating capacity: 1,857; Total capacity: 2,242

Construction
- Opened: 1968

Tenant
- Fairbanks Ice Dogs (NAHL)

The Big Dipper Ice Arena, colloquially known as "The Big Dipper", is a multi-purpose arena in Fairbanks, Alaska. The arena is owned and operated by the Fairbanks North Star Borough. Originally constructed as an airplane hangar for the Lend-Lease program in Tanacross, southeast of Fairbanks, the building was dismantled, transported to Fairbanks and reassembled in 1968. It has undergone two major renovations since then. The building is home to the Fairbanks Ice Dogs ice hockey team. The borough's parks and recreation department is headquartered in the building.

== History ==
Prior to 1968, the building now known as the Big Dipper was an aircraft hangar located in Tanacross, Alaska. Constructed during World War II, the building saw little use after the war.

In 1968, Hez Ray, a teacher and coach at Lathrop High School, organized a crew of high school students and volunteers and undertook a project to move the derelict hangar to Fairbanks and repurpose it as an ice skating arena. Coach Ray's initial group of boys were “First Boots on the Ground” in the beginning of the enormous project. The incredible story of this adventure is in Coach Ray's book “The Big Dipper, A Dream is Born”. (Copyright Hez Ray, 2014) (ISBN 978-0-692-22659-9) The group purchased the hangar for a dollar and, using equipment donated by Fairbanks construction companies, dismantled the building and moved it to Fairbanks. The volunteers then reconstructed the building in its present location from the dismantled parts of the hangar. After rebuilding the hangar, the volunteers built an ice rink and bleachers inside, but due to a lack of resources the building itself was reconstructed essentially as it had been in Tanacross. Heated restrooms and locker rooms with showers were added in 1972–1973. The building itself remained unheated until its 1980s renovation, with large portable space heaters normally associated with airplane hangars used on occasion in the winter, in an attempt to provide some heat to the facility during events.

The World Eskimo Indian Olympics was held in the building for most of its existence. When the Dipper was unavailable due to renovations, WEIO decided to hold their 2007 event at the Sullivan Arena in Anchorage, the first time it was held outside of Fairbanks. As an enticement to remain in Fairbanks, WEIO was offered the Carlson Center in place of the Dipper for future events, where it has been held since.
