= 2010–11 NAHL season =

- League: North American Hockey League
- Sport: Ice hockey
- Duration: Regular season September 10, 2010 – March 27, 2011; Postseason; March 31 – May 7, 2011
- Games: 58
- Teams: 26

Draft
- Top draft pick: Tyson McCallum
- Picked by: Dawson Creek Rage

Regular season
- Season champions: Topeka RoadRunners
- Season MVP: Robert Tadazak (Michigan Warriors)
- Top scorer: Cody Wydo (Motor City Metal Jackets)

Robertson Cup Playoffs
- Finals champions: Fairbanks Ice Dogs
- Runners-up: Michigan Warriors

NAHL seasons
- ← 2009–10 2011–12 →

The 2010–11 NAHL season was the 27th season of the North American Hockey League. The regular season ran from September 2011 to April 2012 with a 58-game schedule for each team. The Topeka RoadRunners won the regular season championship. The Fairbanks Ice Dogs defeated the Michigan Warriors 4 to 2 to capture the Robertson Cup.

== Member changes ==
- In April of 2009, the NAHL approved of an expansion team in Dawson Creek, British Columbia. The franchise would be the first Canadian club in the NAHL 2004. However, in order to give the new club, the Dawson Creek Rage, enough time to properly outfit themselves, their entry into the league was delayed until this season.
- On December 15, 2009, the Fresno Monsters, a junior team in the Western States Hockey League, were granted conditional approved to join the NAHL as an expansion franchise. The organization eventually decided to continue operating their original club in the WSHL as well as a separate Tier II franchise.
- Less than a month later, the NAHL added a second expansion team for 2010 when the Aberdeen Wings were approved.
- A few days later, the Chicago Hitmen received approval to join the league as an expansion franchise.
- At the beginning of March, the Austin Bruins were announced as another expansion club for this season.
- One day later, the NAHL approved the relocation of the North Iowa Outlaws. The club moved to Onalaska, Wisconsin and became the Coulee Region Chill.
- In late March, the NAHL approved Rio Rancho, New Mexico as the site for a new expansion franchise. The team would eventually be named 'New Mexico Mustangs'.
- In early May, the NAHL approved the relocation of the Marquette Rangers to Flint, Michigan. The franchise was renamed the Michigan Warriors.
- By the middle of the month, the NAHL was able to find new owners for Albert Lea Thunder. The league had assumed control of the club in the middle of the season due to USA Hockey rule violations and now permitted the franchise to relocate to Texas and become the Amarillo Bulls.
- A few days later, the Corpus Christi IceRays, a professional team from the Central Hockey League, purchased the Alpena IceDiggers. The IceRays folded their professional club and moved all of their assets, including the team's name, to the NAHL.
- In early July, the Port Huron Fighting Falcons were added to the league as yet another expansion club. This brought the final number of teams joining the league up to seven.

== Regular season ==
The standings at the end of the regular season were as follows:

Note: x = clinched playoff berth; y = clinched division title; z = clinched regular season title

=== Standings ===
==== Central Division ====
Team	GP	W	L	OTL	Pts	GF	GA
xy – Alexandria Blizzard	58	33	19	6	72	208	177
x – Coulee Region Chill	58	33	20	5	71	204	180
x – Owatonna Express	58	32	19	7	71	175	179
x – Bismarck Bobcats	58	31	22	5	67	179	156
Austin Bruins	58	23	31	4	50	151	186
Aberdeen Wings	58	20	34	4	44	166	219

==== North Division ====
Team	GP	W	L	OTL	Pts	GF	GA
xy – St. Louis Bandits	58	41	13	4	86	215	120
x – Traverse City North Stars	58	40	17	1	81	211	159
x – Michigan Warriors	58	35	17	6	76	202	141
x – Janesville Jets	58	35	9	4	74	170	121
Springfield Jr. Blues	58	31	24	3	65	191	170
Motor City Metal Jackets	58	31	25	2	64	228	188
Chicago Hitmen	58	9	45	4	22	132	286
Port Huron Fighting Falcons	58	6	46	6	18	127	312

==== South Division ====
Team	GP	W	L	OTL	Pts	GF	GA
xyz – Topeka RoadRunners	58	43	12	3	89	237	146
x – Amarillo Bulls	58	36	16	6	78	209	171
x – Texas Tornado	58	35	16	8	78	213	164
x – Wichita Falls Wildcats	58	26	27	5	57	189	190
Corpus Christi IceRays	58	19	34	5	43	158	238
New Mexico Mustangs	58	19	35	4	42	141	220

==== West Division ====
Team	GP	W	L	OTL	Pts	GF	GA
xy – Fairbanks Ice Dogs	58	40	15	3	83	245	171
x – Wenatchee Wild	58	34	21	3	71	207	148
x – Alaska Avalanche	58	32	22	4	68	193	173
x – Kenai River Brown Bears	58	27	24	7	61	189	191
Dawson Creek Rage	58	24	31	3	51	160	209
Fresno Monsters	58	19	34	5	43	158	243

=== Statistics ===
==== Scoring leaders ====
The following players led the league in regular season points at the completion of all regular season games.

Player	Team	GP	G	A	Pts	PIM
Cody Wydo	Motor City Metal Jackets	58	40	51	91	55
Nardo Nagtzaam	Alexandria Blizzard	58	36	51	87	57
Steve Brancheau	Motor City Metal Jackets	55	28	43	71	96
R. J. Kleiman	Motor City/St. Louis	50	28	41	69	39
Chris Ciotti	St. Louis Bandits	57	31	37	68	54
Michael Hill	Topeka RoadRunners	43	37	29	66	105
Justin Hussar	Topeka RoadRunners	58	33	33	66	20
Jared Linnell	Fairbanks Ice Dogs	58	34	31	65	68
Andrew Kolb	Michigan Warriors	44	31	34	65	34
Zac Frischmon	Coulee Region Chill	58	31	34	65	39

==== Leading goaltenders ====
Note: GP = Games played; Mins = Minutes played; W = Wins; L = Losses; OTL = Overtime losses; SOL = Shootout losses; SO = Shutouts; GAA = Goals against average; SV% = Save percentage

Player	Team	GP	Mins	W	L	OTL	SOL	GA	SV	SV%	GAA
Robert Tadazak	Michigan Warriors	45	2508:39	27	9	2	3	73	1,307	.944	1.75
Tom Comunale	St. Louis Bandits	25	1403:42	15	7	0	1	41	475	.914	1.75
Matt Green	St. Louis Bandits	23	1321:52	17	4	0	1	45	470	.904	2.04
David Jacobson	Janesville Jets	43	2538:53	26	14	1	2	88	1,076	.918	2.08
Steve Bolton	New Mexico/Amarillo/Traverse City	22	1252:36	15	5	0	1	47	582	.919	2.25

== Robertson Cup playoffs ==
Five teams qualify for the Robertson cup quarterfinals, the four division champions and the host (Topeka). If Topeka won their division final, the runner-up would receive the final qualifying spot.
The five qualifiers were then reseeded based upon their regular season record. The top three teams automatically advanced to the round-robin while the lowest two reams faced one another for the final spot.
The team with the best record in the Round Robin series would receive a bye to the championship game. The second and third place teams would meet in a semifinal match to determine the other finals qualifier.
For the Round Robin, ties were broken first by head-to-head matchup and then by goal differential.

Division Semifinals (Best-of-5)
C1	Alexandria Blizzard	6	1	3	3	1
C4	Bismarck Bobcats	1	5	6	1	2
Central Division
C2	Coulee Region Chill	1	4*	4*	3	-
C3	Owatonna Express	2	3	3	1	-
N1	St. Louis Bandits	3	3	2	3	4
N4	Janesville Jets	2	4	1	4*	0
North Division
N2	Traverse City North Stars	1	5*	2	0	-
N3	Michigan Warriors	3	4	3*	5	-
S1	Topeka RoadRunners	5	0	5	3	4
S4	Wichita Falls Wildcats	1	1*	2	4*	3
South Division
S2	Amarillo Bulls	7	5	4	2*	-
S3	Texas Tornado	5	3	6	1	-
W1	Fairbanks Ice Dogs	5	6	7	-	-
W4	Kenai River Brown Bears	1	1	2	-	-
West Division
W2	Wenatchee Wild	4	4*	4	-	-
W3	Alaska Avalanche	1	3	2	-	-

Division Finals (Best-of-5)
C4	Bismarck Bobcats	6	3	4	3	3
C2	Coulee Region Chill	4	6	0	4*	1
N1	St. Louis Bandits	2	2	1	3	1
N3	Michigan Warriors	0	3	2	2	2
S1	Topeka RoadRunners	3*	3	3*	2	1
S2	Amarillo Bulls	2	4	2	4	3
W1	Fairbanks Ice Dogs	4*	6	1	5*	-
W3	Wenatchee Wild	3	3	2	4	-

Quarterfinal Play-in (Best-of-3)
4	Michigan Warriors	1	6**	-
5	Bismarck Bobcats	0	5	-

Quarterfinal (Round Robin)
1	Topeka Roadrunners	-	3	3	2
2	Fairbanks Ice Dogs	4	-	2	4
3	Amarillo Bulls	4	1	-	5
4	Michigan Warriors	5	2	2	-

Semifinal (Best-of-1)
3	Amarillo Bulls	2
4	Michigan Warriors	6

Championship (Best-of-1)
2	Fairbanks Ice Dogs	4
4	Michigan Warriors	2

Note: * denotes overtime period(s)

== Division Semifinals ==
=== Central Division ===
==== (C1) Alexandria Blizzard vs. (C4) Bismarck Bobcats ====
April 1	Alexandria Blizzard	6 – 1	Bismarck Bobcats	Runestone Community Center
1:35 - Jordan Nelson (1); 10:48 - Nardo Nagtzaam (1); 12:21 - Reid Sturos (1); 17:37 - Rock Einersen (1)		First period	No scoring
1:44 - Steve Zierke (1); 5:02 - Thomas Williams (1)		Second period	No scoring
No scoring		Third period	Jason Nash (1) - 1:36
Jake Williams (28 saves / 29 shots)		Goalie stats	Ryan Faragher (8 saves / 14 shots); Tommy Burke (20 saves / 20 shots)

April 2	Alexandria Blizzard	1 – 5	Bismarck Bobcats	Runestone Community Center
No scoring		First period	John Furgele (1) - pp - 12:23
18:41 - pp - Reid Sturos (1)		Second period	Frankie DeAugustine (1) - 4:05; Charles Mosey (1) - 8:12; Danny Ray (1) - pp - 11:43
No scoring		Third period	Charles Mosey (2) - 3:16
Jake Williams (20 saves / 25 shots)		Goalie stats	Tommy Burke (28 saves / 29 shots)

April 8	Bismarck Bobcats	6 – 3	Alexandria Blizzard	V.F.W. Sports Center
2:06 - Castan Sommer (1); 7:06 - Matthew Gates (1)		First period	Steve Zierke (2) - 3:49; Brent Bain (1) - 15:13
11:41 - pp - Matthew Gates (2)		Second period	Steve Zierke (3) - pp - 4:09
8:23 - Samuel Dougherty (1); 16:19 - Frankie DeAugustine (2); 19:35 - en - Emerson Auvenshine (1)		Third period	No scoring
Tommy Burke (30 saves / 33 shots)		Goalie stats	Jake Williams (36 saves / 41 shots)

April 9	Bismarck Bobcats	1 – 3	Alexandria Blizzard	V.F.W. Sports Center
13:51 - Daniel Zawacki (1)		First period	No scoring
No scoring		Second period	No scoring
No scoring		Third period	Nardo Nagtzaam (2) - 4:39; Brent Bain (2) - 15:34; Craig Lindegard (1) - en - 16:28
Tommy Burke (28 saves / 30 shots)		Goalie stats	Jake Williams (29 saves / 30 shots)

April 11	Alexandria Blizzard	1 – 2	Bismarck Bobcats	Runestone Community Center
No scoring		First period	Matthew Gates (2) - 5:50
No scoring		Second period	No scoring
12:21 - Steve Zierke (4)		Third period	Emerson Auvenshine (2) - 19:03
Jake Williams (16 saves / 18 shots)		Goalie stats	Ryan Faragher (45 saves / 46 shots)

Bismarck wins series 3 – 2

==== (C2) Coulee Region Chill vs. (C3) Owatonna Express ====
April 1	Coulee Region Chill	1 – 2	Owatonna Express	Onalaska OmniCenter
No scoring		First period	Jake Youso (1) – 0:29
9:31 – Ben Jaremko (1)		Second period	John Haeg (1) – 13:16
No scoring		Third period	No scoring
Paul Moberg (20 saves / 22 shots)		Goalie stats	Charles Williams (42 saves / 43 shots)

April 2	Coulee Region Chill	4 – 3	OT	Owatonna Express	Onalaska OmniCenter
10:04 - Eric Drapluk (1)		First period		John Haeg (2) - 17:59
0:48 - David Ripple (1); 11:46 - pp - Matt Blomquist (1)		Second period		Schyler Adams (1) - 8:08
No scoring		Third period		Andy Singerhouse (1) - 19:38
8:14 - Zac Frischmon (1)		First overtime period		No scoring
Aaron Davis (30 saves / 33 shots)		Goalie stats		Charles Williams (28 saves / 32 shots)

April 8	Owatonna Express	3 – 4	OT	Coulee Region Chill	Four Seasons Centre
6:49 - Lawrence Cornellier (1); 14:19 - Jacob Youso (1)		First period		Lucas Dillon (1) - pp - 1:33; Zac Frischmon (1) - 19:20
No scoring		Second period		Connor Gaarder (1) - 18:50
18:50 - Jacob Youso (2)		Third period		No scoring
No scoring		First overtime period		Zac Frischmon (2) - 6:33
Charles Williams (25 saves / 29 shots)		Goalie stats		Aaron Davis (34 saves / 37 shots)

April 9	Owatonna Express	1 – 3	Coulee Region Chill	Four Seasons Centre
No scoring		First period	Berkley Scott (1) - 8:56
No scoring		Second period	No scoring
18:31 - Nick Widing (1)		Third period	Matt Blomquist (2) - 17:18; Zac Frischmon (2) - en - 19:38
Charles Williams (27 saves / 29 shots)		Goalie stats	Aaron Davis (25 saves / 26 shots)

Coulee Region wins series 3 – 1

=== North Division ===
==== (N1) St. Louis Bandits vs. (N4) Janesville Jets ====
March 31	St. Louis Bandits	3 – 2	Janesville Jets	Hardee's Iceplex
11:09 – R.J. Kleiman (1)		First period	Ross Mauermann (1) – 4:32
3:32 – Joe Kalisz (1)		Second period	No scoring
2:30 – pp – Isak Quakenbush (1)		Third period	John Olen (1) – 19:04
Tom Comunale (27 saves / 29 shots)		Goalie stats	David Jacobson (24 saves / 27 shots)

April 2	St. Louis Bandits	3 – 4	Janesville Jets	Hardee's Iceplex
17:05 – Joe Kalisz (2); 18:43 – pp – Joe Kalisz (3)		First period	Connor McBride (1) – 8:35
No scoring		Second period	Jordan Tredinnick (1) – pp – 6:20; Connor McBride (2) – pp – 12:03; John Olen (1) – sh – 12:55
17:28 – Taylor Wolfe (1)		Third period	No scoring
Tom Comunale (11 saves / 15 shots); Matt Green (13 saves / 13 shots)		Goalie stats	Tony Kujava (39 saves / 42 shots)

April 8	Janesville Jets	1 – 2	St. Louis Bandits	Janesville Ice Arena
No scoring		First period	No scoring
No scoring		Second period	Brad Smith (1) – pp – 14:16
17:35 – Jordan Tredinnick (1)		Third period	Brad Smith (2) – 7:07
Tony Kujava (26 saves / 28 shots)		Goalie stats	Matt Green (18 saves / 19 shots)

April 9	Janesville Jets	4 – 3	OT	St. Louis Bandits	Janesville Ice Arena
No scoring		First period		No scoring
11:28 – Ross Mauermann (2)		Second period		Chris Ciotti (1) – 0:20; R.J. Kleiman (2) – pp – 17:53
7:45 – pp – Ross Mauermann (3); 14:39 – Jordan Tredinnick (2)		Third period		Nick Carey (1) – 9:39
10:55 – pp – John Houston (1)		First overtime period		No scoring
David Jacobson (28 saves / 31 shots)		Goalie stats		Matt Green (22 saves / 26 shots)

April 10	St. Louis Bandits	4 – 0	Janesville Jets	Hardee's Iceplex
7:29 – Ryan Stouffer (1)		First period	No scoring
8:00 – Taylor Wolfe (2)		Second period	No scoring
4:10 – Chris Ciotti (2); 8:13 – Kevin Crowe (1)		Third period	No scoring
Tom Comunale (22 saves / 22 shots)		Goalie stats	David Jacobson (26 saves / 30 shots)

St. Louis wins series 3 – 2

==== (N2) Traverse City North Stars vs. (N3) Michigan Warriors ====
April 1	Traverse City North Stars	1 – 3	Michigan Warriors	Molon Rink
No scoring		First period	No scoring
10:20 – Alec Shields (1)		Second period	Andrew Kolb (1) – 10:46
No scoring		Third period	Tyler Perpich (1) – 9:59; David Johnson (1) – 18:07
Steve Bolton (18 saves / 21 shots)		Goalie stats	Robert Tadazak (25 saves / 26 shots)

April 2	Traverse City North Stars	5 – 4	OT	Michigan Warriors	Molon Rink
No scoring		First period		Ryan Trenz (1) – pp – 13:53
14:42 – pp – Tim Opie (1)		Second period		Brandon Boelter (1) – pp – 10:22
5:33 – Eric Rivard (1); 10:03 – pp – Eric Rivard (2); 10:57 – James Albrecht (1)		Third period		Andrew Kolb (2) – pp – 8:29; Justin Hoomaian (1) – 14:44
0:47 – pp – Michael Szmatula (1)		First overtime period		No scoring
Steve Bolton (34 saves / 38 shots)		Goalie stats		Robert Tadazak (28 saves / 33 shots)

April 8	Michigan Warriors	3 – 2	OT	Traverse City North Stars	Dort Financial Center
10:57 – Brad Chapman (1)		First period		Alexander Taulien (1) – 8:00
19:59 – pp – Justin Hoomaian (2)		Second period		Justin Scott (1) – 0:33
No scoring		Third period		No scoring
16:08 – A.J. White (1)		First overtime period		No scoring
Robert Tadazak (42 saves / 44 shots)		Goalie stats		Steve Bolton (49 saves / 52 shots)

April 9	Michigan Warriors	5 – 0	Traverse City North Stars	Dort Financial Center
18:59 – pp – Michael Szuma (1)		First period	No scoring
5:08 – A.J. White (2); 17:16 – A.J. White (3)		Second period	No scoring
8:56 – Robert Mantha (1); 9:28 – Kevin Gibson (1)		Third period	No scoring
Robert Tadazak (24 saves / 24 shots)		Goalie stats	Steve Bolton (15 saves / 18 shots); Tyler Marble (7 saves / 9 shots)

Michigan wins series 3 – 1

=== South Division ===
==== (S1) Topeka RoadRunners vs. (S4) Wichita Falls Wildcats ====
April 2	Topeka RoadRunners	5 – 1	Wichita Falls Wildcats	Kansas Expocentre
3:44 – Nate Milam (1); 5:27 – Davey Middleton (1); 7:22 – Kyle Buffardi (1)		First period	Mikhail Sentyurin (1) – pp – 6:19
9:52 – Kyle Sharkey (1)		Second period	No scoring
3:11 – Nate Milam (2)		Third period	No scoring
Rasmus Tirronen (25 saves / 26 shots)		Goalie stats	Tyler Green (40 saves / 45 shots)

April 3	Topeka RoadRunners	0 – 1	OT	Wichita Falls Wildcats	Kansas Expocentre
No scoring		First period		No scoring
No scoring		Second period		No scoring
No scoring		Third period		No scoring
No scoring		First overtime period		Richard Young (1) – 2:19
Eric Rohrkemper (26 saves / 27 shots)		Goalie stats		Tyler Green (39 saves / 39 shots)

April 8	Wichita Falls Wildcats	2 – 5	Topeka RoadRunners	Kay Yeager Coliseum
14:16 – Tanner Fahlstedt (1)		First period	No scoring
No scoring		Second period	Andrew O'Leary (1) – 12:09; Ryan White (1) – sh – 14:24
18:25 – sh – Ryan Frost (1)		Third period	Nate Milam (3) – 5:12; Brian Christie (1) – pp – 17:53; Brian Christie (2) – sh – en – 19:33
Tyler Green (39 saves / 43 shots)		Goalie stats	Rasmus Tirronen (28 saves / 30 shots)

April 9	Wichita Falls Wildcats	4 – 3	OT	Topeka RoadRunners	Kay Yeager Coliseum
No scoring		First period		Nate Milam (4) – sh – 3:37; Ryan White (2) – 19:11
14:52 – pp – Mikhail Sentyurin (2)		Second period		No scoring
17:17 – Tanner Fahlstedt (2); 19:33 – Ryan Frost (2)		Third period		Kyle Sharkey (2) – pp – 15:06
9:09 – Ryan Frost (3)		First overtime period		No scoring
Eric Rohrkemper (26 saves / 30 shots)		Goalie stats		Tyler Green (25 saves / 28 shots)

April 11	Topeka RoadRunners	4 – 3	Wichita Falls Wildcats	Kansas Expocentre
No scoring		First period	Jason McAloon (1) – 9:42
9:53 – Justin Hussar (1); 11:51 – pp – Davey Middleton (2); 14:01 – Zach Schrotenboer (1)		Second period	Richard Young (2) – 6:01; Ryan Frost (4) – pp – 14:37
18:56 – Jordan Davis (1)		Third period	No scoring
Rasmus Tirronen (22 saves / 25 shots)		Goalie stats	Tyler Green (36 saves / 40 shots)

Topeka wins series 3 – 2

==== (S2) St. Louis Bandits vs. (S3) Texas Tornado ====
March 31	Amarillo Bulls	7 – 5	Texas Tornado	Amarillo Civic Center
2:36 - Zack Smoot (1)		First period	Tyler Rostenkowski (1) - 6:32; Walker Hyland (1) - 14:56
11:25 - Sean Keane (1); 12:06 - sh - Matt Johnson (1); 14:34 - pp - Dan Sherer (1); 18:13 - T.J. Sarcona (1)		Second period	No scoring
0:42 - Sean Keane (2); 19:59 - en - Cody Freeman (1)		Third period	Jimmy Murray (1) - pp - 11:54; Jimmy Murray (2) - 15:17; Marc Biggs (1) - 18:33
Nikifor Szczerba (31 saves / 36 shots)		Goalie stats	Jimmy Kruger (29 saves / 35 shots)

April 1	Amarillo Bulls	5 – 3	Texas Tornado	Amarillo Civic Center
13:35 - John Rey (1); 15:01 - pp - Brandon Lubin (1)		First period	Seth Johnson (1) - 4:22; Jack Price (1) - 9:36
No scoring		Second period	No scoring
7:13 - pp - Zack Smoot (2); 12:12 - Matt Johnson (2); 12:12 - Brooks Behling (1)		Third period	David Rigatti (1) - 2:04
Nikifor Szczerba (27 saves / 30 shots)		Goalie stats	Jimmy Kruger (27 saves / 32 shots)

April 8	Texas Tornado	6 – 4	Amarillo Bulls	Dr Pepper Arena
No scoring		First period	Dan McDougall (1) - pp - 12:58; Joe Kozlak (1) - pp - 15:21
6:07 - pp - Nathan Sliwinski (1); 12:39 - Seth Johnson (2); 15:10 - David Rigatti (2); 16:05 - Jackson Leef (1)		Second period	Zack Smoot (3) - 3:24
1:15 - pp - George Malliaras (1); 3:57 - J.D. Howard (1)		Third period	Brooks Behling (2) - 14:14
Jimmy Kruger (33 saves / 37 shots)		Goalie stats	Nikifor Szczerba (25 saves / 31 shots); Gregg Gruehl (5 saves / 5 shots)

April 9	Texas Tornado	1 – 2	OT	Amarillo Bulls	Dr Pepper Arena
No scoring		First period		No scoring
9:25 - Justin Jones (1)		Second period		Mitch Rogge (1) - 12:02
No scoring		Third period		No scoring
No scoring		First overtime period		Cody Freeman (2) - pp - 3:52
Jimmy Kruger (23 saves / 25 shots)		Goalie stats		Nikifor Szczerba (34 saves / 35 shots)

Amarillo wins series 3 – 1

=== West Division ===
==== (W1) Fairbanks Ice Dogs vs. (W4) Kenai River Brown Bears ====
April 1	Fairbanks Ice Dogs	5 – 1	Kenai River Brown Bears	Big Dipper Ice Arena
18:47 – Preston Hodge (1)		First period	Brett Lubanski (1) – 19:51
8:17 – John Stampohar (1); 12:38 – Alec Hajdukovich (1); 14:01 – J.T. Osborn (1)		Second period	No scoring
6:09 – Tayler Munson (1)		Third period	No scoring
Joe Phillippi (30 saves / 31 shots)		Goalie stats	Mathias Dahlström (17 saves / 22 shots); Josh Benton (9 saves / 9 shots)

April 2	Fairbanks Ice Dogs	6 – 1	Kenai River Brown Bears	Big Dipper Ice Arena
10:50 – Alexander Jensen (1); 16:39 – Brock Carlston (1)		First period	No scoring
0:30 – pp – John Stampohar (2); 9:20 – Preston Hodge (2)		Second period	Jesse Ramsey (1) – 7:23
2:31 – Tayler Munson (2); 18:07 – pp – Zach Vierling (1)		Third period	No scoring
Joe Phillippi (24 saves / 25 shots)		Goalie stats	Josh Benton (25 saves / 31 shots)

April 8	Kenai River Brown Bears	2 – 7	Fairbanks Ice Dogs	Soldotna Sports Center
1:38 – Kyle Keenan (1); 13:55 – pp – Bobby Murphy (1)		First period	Zach Vierling (2) – pp – 11:43; Charlie Thauwald (1) – pp – 17:39
No scoring		Second period	Alexander Jensen (2) – 1:04; Alexander Jensen (3) – 12:59; Alexander Jensen (4) – 17:25
No scoring		Third period	Gabe Levin (1) – 6:21; Zach Vierling (3) – pp – 9:28
Mathias Dahlström (12 saves / 16 shots); Josh Benton (13 saves / 16 shots)		Goalie stats	Joe Phillippi (44 saves / 46 shots)

Fairbanks wins series 3 – 0

==== (W2) Wenatchee Wild vs. (W3) Alaska Avalanche ====
April 1	Wenatchee Wild	4 – 1	Alaska Avalanche	Town Toyota Center
18:00 - Michael Di Puma (1)		First period	No scoring
2:01 - D.J. Vandercook (1)		Second period	No scoring
6:20 - pp - Mario Puskarich (1); 13:50 - pp - Tyler Hope (1)		Third period	Grant Dye (1) - pp - 16:16
Brandon Jaeger (19 saves / 20 shots)		Goalie stats	Landon Peterson (33 saves / 37 shots)

April 2	Wenatchee Wild	4 – 3	OT	Alaska Avalanche	Town Toyota Center
9:42 - Jacob Barber (1); 11:43 - pp - Max McHugh (1)		First period		No scoring
3:26 - Michael Di Puma (2)		Second period		Eliot Grauer (1) - pp - 16:24; Matt Friese (1) - 19:35
No scoring		Third period		Matt Friese (2) - pp - 9:18
4:06 - D.J. Vandercook (2)		First overtime period		No scoring
Brandon Jaeger (27 saves / 30 shots)		Goalie stats		Nick Kulmanovsky (9 saves / 12 shots); Landon Peterson (11 saves / 12 shots)

April 8	Alaska Avalanche	2 – 4	Wenatchee Wild	MTA Events Center
6:10 - pp - Zach Smith (1)		First period	Michael Di Puma (3) - 16:27
No scoring		Second period	Max McHugh (2) - 8:24
12:54 - sh - Eliot Grauer (2)		Third period	Matt Cope (1) - 1:17; Shawn Pauly (1) - pp - 13:19
Landon Peterson (23 saves / 27 shots)		Goalie stats	Brandon Jaeger (16 saves / 18 shots)

Wenatchee wins series 3 – 0

== Division Finals ==
=== Central Division ===
==== (C2) Coulee Region Chill vs. (C4) Bismarck Bobcats ====
April 15	Coulee Region Chill	4 – 6	Bismarck Bobcats	Onalaska OmniCenter
No scoring		First period	Matthew Gates (3) - pp - 4:13; Danny Ray (2) - pp - 15:21
13:02 - Tommy Miller (1); 15:59 - Berkley Scott (2); 19:15 - Berkley Scott (3)		Second period	Daniel Zawacki (2) - 3:19; Emerson Auvenshine (3) - 3:57; Daniel Zawacki (3) - pp - 15:43
19:46 - Eric Drapluk (2)		Third period	Charles Mosey (3) - 4:10
Aaron Davis (29 saves / 35 shots)		Goalie stats	Ryan Faragher (29 saves / 33 shots)

April 16	Coulee Region Chill	6 – 3	Bismarck Bobcats	Onalaska OmniCenter
2:18 - Jake Useldinger (1); 8:10 - Mike McDonald (1); 18:57 - Berkley Scott (4); 19:35 - David Ripple (2)		First period	No scoring
2:04 - Connor Gaarder (2)		Second period	Frankie DeAugustine (3) - 19:24
18:58 - en - Lucas Dillon (2)		Third period	Frankie DeAugustine (4) - 9:31; Charles Mosey (4) - pp - 19:52
Paul Moberg (44 saves / 47 shots)		Goalie stats	Ryan Faragher (11 saves / 14 shots); Tommy Burke (22 saves / 24 shots)

April 22	Bismarck Bobcats	4 – 0	Coulee Region Chill	V.F.W. Sports Center
3:03 - pp - Charles Mosey (5)		First period	No scoring
5:54 - Frankie DeAugustine (5)		Second period	No scoring
4:30 - Frankie DeAugustine (6); 11:04 - pp - Tyler Richter (1)		Third period	No scoring
Ryan Faragher (26 saves / 26 shots)		Goalie stats	Paul Moberg (31 saves / 35 shots)

April 23	Bismarck Bobcats	3 – 4	OT	Coulee Region Chill	V.F.W. Sports Center
No scoring		First period		No scoring
10:01 - Matthew Gates (4); 16:30 - Charles Mosey (6); 17:29 - Castan Sommer (2)		Second period		Zac Frischmon (5) - 1:18; Connor Gaarder (3) - pp - 2:50
No scoring		Third period		Zac Frischmon (6) - 4:14
No scoring		First overtime period		Eric Drapluk (2) - 6:15
Ryan Faragher (27 saves / 31 shots)		Goalie stats		Paul Moberg (44 saves / 47 shots)

April 25	Coulee Region Chill	1 – 3	Bismarck Bobcats	Onalaska OmniCenter
0:51 - Berkley Scott (5)		First period	Bryce Schmitt (1) - 16:23
No scoring		Second period	Rodney Lalonde (1) - 2:27
No scoring		Third period	Castan Sommer (3) - en - 19:25
Paul Moberg (43 saves / 45 shots)		Goalie stats	Ryan Faragher (33 saves / 34 shots)

Bismarck wins series 3 – 2

=== North Division ===
==== (N1) St. Louis Bandits vs. (N3) Michigan Warriors ====
April 14	St. Louis Bandits	2 – 0	Michigan Warriors	Hardee's Iceplex
7:18 – Stephen Bopp (1)		First period	No scoring
No scoring		Second period	No scoring
3:52 – Isak Quakenbush (2)		Third period	No scoring
Tom Comunale (23 saves / 23 shots)		Goalie stats	Robert Tadazak (31 saves / 33 shots)

April 15	St. Louis Bandits	2 – 3	Michigan Warriors	Hardee's Iceplex
No scoring		First period	No scoring
No scoring		Second period	Scott Henegar (1) – pp – 5:34; Scott Henegar (2) – pp – 12:05
1:54 – Evan Stibbard (1); 3:11 – Ryan Stouffer (2)		Third period	Robert Mantha (2) – 11:17
Tom Comunale (23 saves / 26 shots)		Goalie stats	Robert Tadazak (26 saves / 28 shots)

April 22	Michigan Warriors	2 – 1	St. Louis Bandits	Dort Financial Center
No scoring		First period	No scoring
14:35 – Robert Mantha (3)		Second period	No scoring
18:24 – Brandon Boelter (2)		Third period	Taylor Wolfe (3) – pp – 15:37
Robert Tadazak (36 saves / 37 shots)		Goalie stats	Tom Comunale (20 saves / 22 shots)

April 23	Michigan Warriors	2 – 3	St. Louis Bandits	Dort Financial Center
No scoring		First period	Stephen Bopp (2) – 7:45; Blake Edwards (1) – 13:03
No scoring		Second period	No scoring
6:15 – Scott Henegar (3); 10:33 – pp – Ryan Green (1)		Third period	Patrick Sheehan (1) – 18:55
Robert Tadazak (35 saves / 38 shots)		Goalie stats	Tom Comunale (27 saves / 29 shots)

April 25	St. Louis Bandits	1 – 2	Michigan Warriors	Hardee's Iceplex
No scoring		First period	Robert Tadazak (1) – pp – 6:01
No scoring		Second period	Andrew Kolb (3) – 16:20
18:10 – Evan Stibbard (2)		Third period	No scoring
Tom Comunale (29 saves / 31 shots)		Goalie stats	Robert Tadazak (29 saves / 30 shots)

Michigan wins series 3 – 2

=== South Division ===
==== (S1) Topeka RoadRunners vs. (S2) Amarillo Bulls ====
April 15	Topeka RoadRunners	3 – 2	OT	Amarillo Bulls	Amarillo Civic Center
No scoring		First period		Brandon Lubin (2) - pp - 3:15
11:51 - Jordan Davis (2)		Second period		No scoring
7:19 - Nate Milam (5)		Third period		Matt Johnson (3) - 18:44
14:07 - Nate Milam (6)		First overtime period		No scoring
Rasmus Tirronen (22 saves / 24 shots)		Goalie stats		Nikifor Szczerba (37 saves / 40 shots)

April 16	Topeka RoadRunners	3 – 4	Amarillo Bulls	Amarillo Civic Center
13:44 - Justin Hussar (2); 19:21 - Kyle Sharkey (3)		First period	No scoring
2:16 - pp - Brian Christie (3)		Second period	No scoring
No scoring		Third period	T.J. Sarcona (2) - 10:36; Dan McDougall (2) - 11:40; Zack Smoot (4) - pp - 12:40; Cody Freeman (2) - 13:28
Nikifor Szczerba (22 saves / 25 shots)		Goalie stats	Rasmus Tirronen (21 saves / 25 shots)

April 21	Amarillo Bulls	2 – 3	OT	Topeka RoadRunners	Kansas Expocentre
4:35 - Brooks Behling (3)		First period		Brian Christie (4) - 14:06
4:58 - Luke Jenkins (1)		Second period		Kyle Sharkey (4) - 4:53
No scoring		Third period		No scoring
No scoring		First overtime period		9:09 - Jordan Davis (3)
Rasmus Tirronen (30 saves / 32 shots)		Goalie stats		Nikifor Szczerba (35 saves / 38 shots)

April 22	Amarillo Bulls	4 – 2	Topeka RoadRunners	Kansas Expocentre
6:42 - Zack Smoot (5)		First period	Nate Milam (7) - pp - 9:03
18:06 - pp - Derek Hills (1)		Second period	Kyle Sharkey (5) - 8:49
10:06 - Dan McDougall (3); 16:27 - T.J. Sarcona (3)		Third period	No scoring
Rasmus Tirronen (32 saves / 36 shots)		Goalie stats	Nikifor Szczerba (46 saves / 48 shots)

April 25	Topeka RoadRunners	1 – 3	Amarillo Bulls	Amarillo Civic Center
12:23 - Trevor Campbell (1)		First period	Dan Sherer (2) - pp - 9:26
No scoring		Second period	Matt Johnson (4) - 8:15; Cody Freeman (3) - 8:50
No scoring		Third period	No scoring
Nikifor Szczerba (29 saves / 30 shots)		Goalie stats	Rasmus Tirronen (21 saves / 24 shots)

Amarillo wins series 3 – 2

=== West Division ===
==== (W1) Fairbanks Ice Dogs vs. (W3) Bismarck Bobcats ====
April 15	Fairbanks Ice Dogs	4 – 3	OT	Wenatchee Wild	Onalaska OmniCenter
19:03 - Tyler Voigt (1)		First period		Mario Puskarich (2) - 9:18
0:23 - Charlie Thauwald (2)		Second period		Jacob Barber (2) - pp - 7:02
7:11 - sh - Matt Millis (1)		Third period		Chris Rumble (1) - 19:21
18:23 - John Stampohar (3)		First overtime period		No scoring
Joe Phillippi (47 saves / 50 shots)		Goalie stats		Brandon Jaeger (33 saves / 37 shots)

April 16	Fairbanks Ice Dogs	6 – 3	Wenatchee Wild	Onalaska OmniCenter
1:26 - Zach Vierling (2)		First period	No scoring
2:10 - Jack Callahan (1); 14:38 - John Stampohar (4)		Second period	Jacob Barber (3) - 19:37
2:25 - J.T. Osborn (2); 4:16 - Tayler Munson (3); 18:37 - en - Brandon Carlson (1)		Third period	Michael Di Puma (4) - 12:05; Shawn Pauly (2) - 12:17
Joe Phillippi (46 saves / 49 shots)		Goalie stats	Brandon Jaeger (28 saves / 33 shots); Greg Lewis (7 saves / 7 shots)

April 17	Wenatchee Wild	2 – 1	Fairbanks Ice Dogs	V.F.W. Sports Center
No scoring		First period	No scoring
No scoring		Second period	Brandon Carlson (2) - 17:12
2:08 - D.J. Vandercook (2); 12:19 - Mario Puskarich (3)		Third period	No scoring
Greg Lewis (23 saves / 24 shots); Brandon Jaeger (1 save / 1 shot)		Goalie stats	Joe Phillippi (25 saves / 27 shots)

April 21	Wenatchee Wild	4 – 5	OT	Fairbanks Ice Dogs	V.F.W. Sports Center
9:19 - Chris Rumble (2)		First period		Alec Hajdukovich (2) - 0:44
1:09 - pp - Mario Puskarich (4); 6:10 - Carl-Johan Sjögren (1)		Second period		No scoring
8:27 - Mario Puskarich (5)		Third period		Alexander Jensen (5) - 5:04; Gabe Levin (2) - 13:57; J.T. Osborn (3) - 19:20
No scoring		First overtime period		Jared Linnell (1) - 18:13
Greg Lewis (24 saves / 26 shots); Brandon Jaeger (13 saves / 16 shots)		Goalie stats		Joe Phillippi (13 saves / 16 shots); Steve Perry (22 saves / 23 shots)

Fairbanks wins series 3 – 1

== Quarterfinal Play-in ==
=== (N3) Michigan Warriors vs. (C4) Bismarck Bobcats ===
April 28	Michigan Warriors	1 – 0	Bismarck Bobcats	Kansas Expocentre
No scoring		First period	No scoring
18:58 – pp – Tyler Perpich (2)		Second period	No scoring
No scoring		Third period	No scoring
Robert Tadazak (27 saves / 27 shots)		Goalie stats	Ryan Faragher (25 saves / 26 shots)

April 29	Michigan Warriors	6 – 5	2OT	Bismarck Bobcats	Kansas Expocentre
1:49 – Andrew Kolb (4); 4:50 – Brandon Boelter (3); 8:26 – pp – Kevin Gibson (2)		First period		Donald Olivieri (1) – 3:18; Blake Schammel (1) – 14:12; Danny Ray (3) – 19:57
1:07 – pp – Andrew Kolb (5); 16:32 – pp – Scott Henegar (4)		Second period		Daniel Zawacki (4) – pp – 3:40; Danny Ray (4) – pp – 15:59
No scoring		Third period		No scoring
12:13 – Ryan Trenz (1)		Second overtime period		No scoring
Robert Tadazak (39 saves / 44 shots)		Goalie stats		Ryan Faragher (45 saves / 51 shots)

Michigan wins series 2 – 0

== Quarterfinals ==
=== May 3 ===
Amarillo Bulls	5 – 2	Michigan Warriors	Kansas Expocentre
2:33 - Dan Sherer (3)	First period	A.J. White (4) - 11:13
0:41 - Matt Johnson (5); 13:00 - pp - Derek Hills (2)	Second period	Michael Szuma (2) - 14:36
7:15 - Mike Erickson (1); 17:52 - sh - en - Luke Jenkins (2)	Third period	No scoring
Nikifor Szczerba (24 saves / 26 shots)	Goalie stats	Robert Tadazak (29 saves / 33 shots)

Fairbanks Ice Dogs	4 – 3	OT	Topeka RoadRunners	Kansas Expocentre
11:42 - Alec Hajdukovich (3)	First period		No scoring
6:10 - Tayler Munson (4); 8:40 - Jared Linnell (2)	Second period		Davey Middleton (3) - 10:48; Kyle Sharkey (5) - 19:00
No scoring	Third period		Davey Middleton (4) - 8:43
19:06 - Zach Vierling (3)	First overtime period		No scoring
Joe Phillippi (47 saves / 50 shots)	Goalie stats		Rasmus Tirronen (6 saves / 8 shots); Eric Rohrkemper (14 saves / 16 shots)

=== May 4 ===
Fairbanks Ice Dogs	4 – 2	Michigan Warriors	Kansas Expocentre
No scoring	First period	No scoring
No scoring	Second period	Ryan Green (2) - 2:00; Scott Henegar (5) - pp - 8:24
2:42 - Tayler Munson (5); 3:58 - Charlie Thauwald (3); 10:36 - Tayler Munson (6); 19:24 - en - Jared Linnell (3)	Third period	No scoring
Joe Phillippi (21 saves / 23 shots)	Goalie stats	Robert Tadazak (37 saves / 40 shots); Brach Tiller (0 saves / 0 shots)

Amarillo Bulls	4 – 3	Topeka RoadRunners	Kansas Expocentre
Joe Kozlak (2) - 17:28	First period	6:47 - pp - Jordan Davis (4)
Karl Beckman (1) - 8:13; Karl Beckman (2) - 14:19	Second period	19:04 - Jordan Davis (5)
Dan Sherer (4) - 5:41	Third period	5:14 - pp - Jordan Davis (6)
Nikifor Szczerba (26 saves / 29 shots)	Goalie stats	Eric Rohrkemper (13 saves / 17 shots)

=== May 5 ===
Fairbanks Ice Dogs	2 – 1	Amarillo Bulls	Kansas Expocentre
No scoring	First period	No scoring
No scoring	Second period	John Rey (2) - 9:29
8:24 - Jared Linnell (4); 13:02 - Zach Vierling (6)	Third period	No scoring
Joe Phillippi	Goalie stats	Nikifor Szczerba (18 saves / 20 shots)

Michigan Warriors	5 – 2	Topeka RoadRunners	Kansas Expocentre
19:12 - Kevin Gibson (3)	First period	No scoring
5:46 - Bradley Chapman (3); 18:59 - Andrew Kolb (6)	Second period	Jordan Davis (7) - pp - 7:07
9:54 - pp - Brad Chapman (4); 13:02 - ps - Martin Gruse (1)	Third period	Bob Marx (1) - pp - 15:16
Rasmus Tirronen (20 saves / 25 shots)	Goalie stats	Robert Tadazak (22 saves / 24 shots)

== Semifinals ==
=== (S2) Amarillo Bulls vs. (N3) Michigan Warriors ===
May 6	Amarillo Bulls	2 – 6	Michigan Warriors	Kansas Expocentre
18:07 – Mitch Rogge (2)		First period	Scott Henegar (6) – pp – 4:36; Ryan Trenz (3) – pp – 12:46
No scoring		Second period	Scott Henegar (7) – pp – 5:15; Bradley Chapman (4) – 16:44
16:48 – T.J. Sarcona (4)		Third period	Scott Henegar (8) – pp – 1:01; A.J. White (5) – 9:43
Nikifor Szczerba (26 saves / 32 shots)		Goalie stats	Robert Tadazak (29 saves / 31 shots); Brach Tiller (0 saves / 0 shots)

== Robertson Cup Finals ==
=== (W1) Fairbanks Ice Dogs vs. (N3) Michigan Warriors ===
May 7	Fairbanks Ice Dogs	4 – 2	Michigan Warriors	Kansas Expocentre
9:40 – John Stampohar (5)		First period	Bradley Chapman (5) – 3:17; Chris Eckler (1) – sh – 14:01
No scoring		Second period	No scoring
14:38 – Pete Spratte (1); 16:17 – Alexander Jensen (6); 18:30 – Alec Hajdukovich (4)		Third period	No scoring
Joe Phillippi (23 saves / 25 shots)		Goalie stats	Robert Tadazak (27 saves / 31 shots)
