= 2011–12 NAHL season =

- League: North American Hockey League
- Sport: Ice hockey
- Duration: Regular season September 9, 2011 – April 1, 2012; Postseason; April 5 – May 8, 2012
- Games: 60
- Teams: 28

Draft
- Top draft pick: Matt Krug
- Picked by: Kalamazoo Jr. K-Wings

Regular season
- Season champions: Amarillo Bulls
- Season MVP: Joe Kalisz (St. Louis Bandits)
- Top scorer: Joe Kalisz (St. Louis Bandits)

Robertson Cup Playoffs
- Finals champions: Texas Tornado
- Runners-up: St. Louis Bandits

NAHL seasons
- ← 2010–11 2012–13 →

The 2011–12 NAHL season was the 28th season of the North American Hockey League. The regular season ran from September 2011 to April 2012 with a 60-game schedule for each team. The Amarillo Bulls won the regular season championship. The Texas Tornado defeated the St. Louis Bandits 4 to 3 in overtime to capture the Robertson Cup.

== Member changes ==
- In November of 2010, the Kalamazoo Wings were approved to found an expansion franchise with the league. The new club, called the Kalamazoo Jr. K-Wings began play this season.
- In late March, the Minot Minotauros were approved as a second expansion franchise for this season.
- On May 7, 2011, the Motor City Metal Jackets relocated to Jamestown, New York. After the team reveled their new name to be Jamestown Ironmen, the town's displaced junior team, Jamestown Jets, filed a lawsuit against the team, arena and NAHL. The suit persisted for several years, progressing as far as the New York Supreme Court but was later abandoned after the Ironmen folded in 2013.
- A few days later, the NAHL approved the sale and relocation of the Owatonna Express. The franchise was purchased by the Odessa Jackalopes, a minor professional team, who promptly suspended their professional club and began operating solely as a junior organization. The Express were renamed Odessa Jackalopes and took up residence at the Ector County Coliseum.

== Regular season ==
The standings at the end of the regular season were as follows:

Note: x = clinched playoff berth; y = clinched division title; z = clinched regular season title

=== Standings ===
==== Central Division ====
Team	GP	W	L	OTL	Pts	GF	GA
xy – Bismarck Bobcats	60	45	13	2	92	237	160
x – Alexandria Blizzard	60	40	15	5	85	212	156
x – Austin Bruins	60	36	18	6	78	198	162
x – Aberdeen Wings	60	29	24	7	65	187	177
Minot Minotauros	60	7	49	4	18	104	252

==== Midwest Division ====
Team	GP	W	L	OTL	Pts	GF	GA
xy – St. Louis Bandits	60	42	15	3	87	239	148
x – Janesville Jets	60	37	18	5	79	174	134
x – Springfield Jr. Blues	60	31	27	2	64	202	190
x – Coulee Region Chill	60	18	35	7	43	162	229
Chicago Hitmen	60	13	42	5	31	166	310

==== North Division ====
Team	GP	W	L	OTL	Pts	GF	GA
xy – Port Huron Fighting Falcons	60	38	19	3	79	203	159
x – Kalamazoo Jr. K-Wings	60	37	18	4	78	213	171
x – Traverse City North Stars	60	34	20	6	74	200	158
x – Michigan Warriors	60	23	32	5	51	163	212
Jamestown Ironmen	60	19	36	5	43	148	211

==== South Division ====
Team	GP	W	L	OTL	Pts	GF	GA
xyz – Amarillo Bulls	60	46	7	7	99	263	136
x – Texas Tornado	60	36	16	8	80	215	159
x – Topeka RoadRunners	60	38	18	4	80	197	152
x – Odessa Jackalopes	60	27	28	5	59	169	199
Corpus Christi IceRays	60	26	29	5	57	169	199
Wichita Falls Wildcats	60	20	35	5	45	149	204
New Mexico Mustangs	60	18	39	3	39	166	269

==== West Division ====
Team	GP	W	L	OTL	Pts	GF	GA
xy – Fairbanks Ice Dogs	60	39	13	8	86	225	163
x – Wenatchee Wild	60	36	17	7	79	165	102
x – Alaska Avalanche	60	35	19	6	76	192	173
x – Kenai River Brown Bears	60	31	25	6	66	186	189
Fresno Monsters	60	27	23	10	64	167	179
Dawson Creek Rage	60	12	44	4	28	139	264

=== Statistics ===
==== Scoring leaders ====
The following players led the league in regular season points at the completion of all regular season games.

Player	Team	GP	G	A	Pts	PIM
Joe Kalisz	St. Louis Bandits	60	40	51	91	27
Gabe Levin	Fairbanks Ice Dogs	56	18	72	90	37
J. T. Osborn	Fairbanks Ice Dogs	58	40	41	81	114
Jack Prince	Texas Tornado	60	39	39	78	28
Brooks Behling	Amarillo Bulls	57	37	38	75	119
Kyle Cook	Springfield Jr. Blues	59	31	39	70	105
Joseph Birmingham	St. Louis Bandits	60	24	45	69	80
Brett Lubanski	Kenai River Brown Bears	60	17	50	67	26
Chris Sitler	Springfield Jr. Blues	60	26	40	66	54
Josef Pontasch	Springfield Jr. Blues	60	26	39	65	35

==== Leading goaltenders ====
Note: GP = Games played; Mins = Minutes played; W = Wins; L = Losses; OTL = Overtime losses; SOL = Shootout losses; SO = Shutouts; GAA = Goals against average; SV% = Save percentage

Player	Team	GP	Mins	W	L	OTL	SOL	SO	SV%	GAA
Robert Nichols	Wenatchee Wild	34	2059:33	24	6	2	2	10	.938	1.49
Greg Lewis	Wenatchee Wild	26	1559:39	12	11	2	1	4	.919	1.77
Tony Kujava	Janesville Jets	45	2619:11	28	12	1	2	9	.924	1.92
Gregg Gruehl	Amarillo Bulls	35	2005:53	26	4	2	2	2	.917	2.06
Jacob Meyers	Alexandria Blizzard	42	2382:10	30	9	1	1	6	.930	2.09

== Robertson Cup playoffs ==
Six teams qualified for the Round Robin semifinal, the host (Texas) and the five division champions. If Texas won the west division final, the runner-up would receive the final qualifying spot. For the round robin semifinal, ties were broken first by head-to-head matchup and then by goal differential.

Division Semifinals (Best-of-5)
C1	Bismarck Bobcats	7	3	3	5	-
C4	Aberdeen Wings	2	5	0	3	-
Central Division
C2	Alexandria Blizzard	2	5	0	2	-
C3	Austin Bruins	4	0	4	3	-
MW1	St. Louis Bandits	5	6	3	-	-
MW4	Coulee Region Chill	0	0	1	-	-
Midwest Division
MW2	Janesville Jets	0	7	1	2	0
MW3	Springfield Jr. Blues	2	4	3	2	1
N1	Port Huron Fighting Falcons	2	5	3	5	-
N4	Michigan Warriors	5	1	1	2	-
North Division
N2	Kalamazoo Jr. K-Wings	4	7	2	3*	-
N3	Traverse City North Stars	0	3	6	2	-
S1	Amarillo Bulls	5	1	4*	4	-
S4	Odessa Jackalopes	2	5	3	1	-
South Division
S2	Texas Tornado	1	2	3	-	-
S3	Topeka RoadRunners	2*	4	4*	-	-
W1	Fairbanks Ice Dogs	3	4	3	-	-
W4	Kenai River Brown Bears	0	0	2	-	-
West Division
W2	Wenatchee Wild	4	1	2	7	2*
W3	Alaska Avalanche	1	2*	3**	1	1

Division Finals (Best-of-5)
C1	Bismarck Bobcats	6	3	3	4	-
C3	Austin Bruins	3	4*	2	1	-
MW1	St. Louis Bandits	8	0	3	5	-
MW3	Springfield Jr. Blues	1	1	2	3	-
N1	Port Huron Fighting Falcons	4	5	1	4	-
N2	Kalamazoo Jr. K-Wings	2	2	2*	0	-
S1	Amarillo Bulls	8	3	3	3	-
S3	Topeka RoadRunners	6	0	6	1	-
W1	Fairbanks Ice Dogs	5	2*	3	-	-
W2	Wenatchee Wild	2	1	1	-	-

Quarterfinal (Round Robin)
C1	Bismarck Bobcats	-	3	1	2	-	-
MW1	St. Louis Bandits	2	-	-	-	3	3*
N1	Port Huron Fighting Falcons	5	-	-	-	3	4
S1	Amarillo Bulls	6	-	-	-	1	3*
W1	Fairbanks Ice Dogs	-	1	4	3	-	-
S2	Texas Tornado	-	2	5	2	-	-

Semifinal (Best-of-1)
MW1	St. Louis Bandits	3
S1	Amarillo Bulls	2
W1	Fairbanks Ice Dogs	3
S2	Texas Tornado	4*

Championship (Best-of-1)
MW1	St. Louis Bandits	3
S2	Texas Tornado	4*

Note: * denotes overtime period(s)

== Division Semifinals ==
=== Central Division ===
==== (C1) Bismarck Bobcats vs. (C4) Aberdeen Wings ====
April 6	Bismarck Bobcats	7 – 2	Aberdeen Wings	V.F.W. Sports Center
14:35 - pp - Danny Ray (1)		First period	Paul Prescott (1) - 3:21
No scoring		Second period	No scoring
0:13 - Tyler Richter (1); 6:23 - pp - Castan Sommer (1); 16:06 - Shane Omdahl (1); 16:29 - Tyler Richter (2); 18:12 - en - Buster Hebda (1); 19:06 - Tyler Richter (3)		Third period	Stephen Obarzanek (1) - pp - 4:54
Tommy Burke (25 saves / 27 shots)		Goalie stats	Marcus Zelzer (46 saves / 52 shots)

April 7	Bismarck Bobcats	3 – 5	Aberdeen Wings	V.F.W. Sports Center
4:09 - Shane Omdahl (2)		First period	No scoring
No scoring		Second period	Cory Ward (1) - pp - 2:37; Stephen Obarzanek (2) - 16:34; Mack Ohnsted (1) - pp - 19:28
10:27 - pp - Frankie DeAugustine (1); 16:46 - Shane Omdahl (3)		Third period	Cory Ward (2) - pp - 0:49; Stephen Obarzanek (3) - 12:03
Tommy Burke (32 saves / 37 shots)		Goalie stats	Marcus Zelzer (34 saves / 37 shots)

April 13	Aberdeen Wings	0 – 3	Bismarck Bobcats	Odde Ice Center
No scoring		First period	No scoring
No scoring		Second period	Nick Miglio (1) - 4:22; Tyler Richter (2) - pp - 17:46
No scoring		Third period	Castan Sommer (2) - 5:55
Marcus Zelzer (41 saves / 44 shots)		Goalie stats	Aaron Nelson (18 saves / 18 shots)

April 14	Aberdeen Wings	3 – 5	Bismarck Bobcats	Odde Ice Center
No scoring		First period	Adam Knochenmus (1) - 13:29
3:03 - Joe Sullivan (1)		Second period	Castan Sommer (3) - 5:50; Adam Knochenmus (2) - 9:13; Castan Sommer (4) - pp - 17:13
9:13 - Justin Parizek (1); 17:24 - pp - Daniel Zawacki (2)		Third period	Daniel Zawacki (1) - 4:21
Marcus Zelzer (28 saves / 33 shots)		Goalie stats	Aaron Nelson (41 saves / 44 shots)

Bismarck wins series 3 – 1

==== (C2) Alexandria Blizzard vs. (C3) Austin Bruins ====
April 6	Alexandria Blizzard	2 – 4	Austin Bruins	Runestone Community Center
13:08 - pp - Jordan Krebsbach (1)		First period	Jeremy Finger (1) - 3:37
No scoring		Second period	Chris Fischer (1) - pp - 16:21; Colton Kramer (1) - 16:41
12:45 - Justin Moody (1)		Third period	John Kirby (1) - 18:15
Jacob Meyers (26 saves / 30 shots)		Goalie stats	Tyler Bruggeman (39 saves / 41 shots)

April 7	Alexandria Blizzard	5 – 0	Austin Bruins	Runestone Community Center
13:39 - pp - Jordan Krebsbach (2)		First period	No scoring
1:45 - Reid Sturos (1); 12:35 - Tucker Coborn (1)		Second period	No scoring
5:28 - Craig Lindegard (1); 11:00 - Seth Ronsberg (1)		Third period	No scoring
Michael Bitzer (32 saves / 32 shots)		Goalie stats	Tyler Bruggeman (18 saves / 21 shots); Nick Lehr (11 saves / 13 shots)

April 13	Austin Bruins	4 – 0	Alexandria Blizzard	Riverside Arena
1:05 - pp - Charlie Adams (1)		First period	No scoring
13:40 - pp - John Simonson (1); 18:06 - pp - Matt Hansen (1)		Second period	No scoring
19:44 - en - Austin Nelson (1)		Third period	No scoring
Tyler Bruggeman (27 saves / 27 shots)		Goalie stats	Michael Bitzer (37 saves / 40 shots)

April 14	Austin Bruins	3 – 2	Alexandria Blizzard	Riverside Arena
No scoring		First period	No scoring
4:57 - Brandon Wahlin (1); 10:30 - pp - Charlie Adams (2)		Second period	No scoring
18:03 - Nolan Kirley (1)		Third period	Dylan Zink (1) - 0:17; Tucker Coborn (2) - pp - 2:21
Tyler Bruggeman (38 saves / 40 shots)		Goalie stats	Jacob Meyers (27 saves / 30 shots)

Austin wins series 3 – 1

=== Midwest Division ===
==== (E1) St. Louis Bandits vs. (E5) Coulee Region Chill ====
April 6	St. Louis Bandits	5 – 0	Coulee Region Chill	Hardee's Iceplex
7:28 - Joe Kalisz (1); 15:13 - Rance Hughes (1); 15:37 - Frank DiChiara (1)		First period	No scoring
15:44 - Joesph Birmingham (1)		Second period	No scoring
11:32 - Ryan Stouffer (1)		Third period	No scoring
Tyler Green (15 saves / 15 shots)		Goalie stats	Aaron Davis (35 saves / 40 shots)

April 7	St. Louis Bandits	6 – 0	Coulee Region Chill	Hardee's Iceplex
1:32 - Joe Kalisz (2); 17:56 - Ryan Zehnder (1)		First period	No scoring
No scoring		Second period	No scoring
0:25 - sh - Drew Slaton (1); 7:21 - Joesph Birmingham (2); 7:38 - Frank DiChiara (2); 8:23 - pp - Taylor Wolfe (1)		Third period	No scoring
Tyler Green (20 saves / 20 shots)		Goalie stats	Aaron Davis (32 saves / 38 shots)

April 13	Coulee Region Chill	1 – 3	St. Louis Bandits	Green Island Ice Arena
0:40 - Ross Luedtke (1)		First period	No scoring
No scoring		Second period	Joe Kalisz (3) - 8:53; Rance Hughes (2) - 12:52
No scoring		Third period	Joe Kalisz (4) - en - 19:37
Aaron Davis (30 saves / 32 shots)		Goalie stats	Tyler Green (30 saves / 31 shots)

St. Louis wins series 3 – 0

==== (MW2) Janesville Jets vs. (MW3) Springfield Jr. Blues ====
April 6	Janesville Jets	0 – 2	Springfield Jr. Blues	Janesville Ice Arena
No scoring		First period	No scoring
No scoring		Second period	Kyle Cook (1) - sh - 11:33
No scoring		Third period	Cody Dixon (1) - pp - 4:16
Tony Kujava (22 saves / 24 shots)		Goalie stats	Tyler Parks (30 saves / 30 shots)

April 7	Janesville Jets	7 – 4	Springfield Jr. Blues	Janesville Ice Arena
12:31 - Darren McCormick (1)		First period	Garrett Williams (1) - 1:30; Ethan Nauman (1) - 12:45; Jordan Johnson (1) - 19:10
1:47 - Jayce Paulseth (1); 17:01 - David Johnson (1)		Second period	No scoring
0:53 - Jordan Bancroft (1); 10:03 - pp - Connor McBride (1); 11:34 - John Olen (1); 13:49 - pp - Connor McBride (2)		Third period	Kyle Cook (2) - 18:55
Tony Kujava (13 saves / 17 shots)		Goalie stats	Tyler Parks (36 saves / 42 shots); Gabe Antoni (5 saves / 6 shots)

April 13	Springfield Jr. Blues	3 – 1	Janesville Jets	Nelson Center
No scoring		First period	No scoring
12:46 - pp - Chris Sitler (1)		Second period	No scoring
5:26 - sh - Kyle Cook (3); 14:15 - pp - Cody Dixon (2)		Third period	Garrett Cecere (1) - pp - 18:43
Gabe Antoni (33 saves / 34 shots)		Goalie stats	Tony Kujava (28 saves / 31 shots)

April 14	Springfield Jr. Blues	1 – 2	Janesville Jets	Nelson Center
No scoring		First period	No scoring
No scoring		Second period	Lawrence Childs (1) - 9:23
11:04 - Ethan Nauman (2)		Third period	Lawrence Childs (2) - 3:59
Gabe Antoni (32 saves / 34 shots)		Goalie stats	Tony Kujava (20 saves / 21 shots)

April 15	Janesville Jets	0 – 1	Springfield Jr. Blues	Janesville Ice Arena
No scoring		First period	No scoring
No scoring		Second period	No scoring
No scoring		Third period	Chris Sitler (2) - 1:01
Tony Kujava (17 saves / 18 shots)		Goalie stats	Gabe Antoni (21 saves / 21 shots)

Springfield wins series 3 – 2

=== North Division ===
==== (N1) Port Huron Fighting Falcons vs. (N4) Michigan Warriors ====
April 6	Port Huron Fighting Falcons	2 – 5	Michigan Warriors	McMorran Place
3:09 - Kody Polin (1)		First period	No scoring
14:01 - sh - Logan Lemirande (1)		Second period	A.J. White (1) - 0:56; Mike Economos (1) - pp - 2:51; Dan Sakalian (1) - 12:56
No scoring		Third period	Joey Ferriss (1) - pp - 7:41; Bobby Bodette (1) - en - 19:57
Max Milosek (17 saves / 21 shots)		Goalie stats	Trevor Gorsuch (41 saves / 43 shots)

April 7	Port Huron Fighting Falcons	5 – 1	Michigan Warriors	McMorran Place
15:35 - Maxwell Reavis (1)		First period	No scoring
4:44 - Easton Powers (1)		Second period	No scoring
0:22 - Jack Goldberg (1); 5:52 - Mike Moroso (1); 12:55 - Nick Horne (1)		Third period	A.J. White (2) - 5:12
Max Milosek (17 saves / 18 shots)		Goalie stats	Trevor Gorsuch (37 saves / 42 shots)

April 13	Michigan Warriors	1 – 3	Port Huron Fighting Falcons	Perani Arena and Event Center
6:32 - pp - Dan Sakalian (2)		First period	Kody Polin (2) - 2:57
No scoring		Second period	No scoring
No scoring		Third period	Maxwell Reavis (1) - 1:42; Joe Pizza (1) - 3:04
Trevor Gorsuch (32 saves / 35 shots)		Goalie stats	Max Milosek (26 saves / 27 shots)

April 14	Michigan Warriors	2 – 5	Port Huron Fighting Falcons	Perani Arena and Event Center
3:53 - pp - Martin Gruse (1); 7:25 - Mike Economos (2)		First period	Nicholas Sierra (1) - 13:00
No scoring		Second period	Kody Polin (3) - 0:43; Mike Moroso (2) - 11:14; Ian Miller (1) - pp - 12:06
No scoring		Third period	Kody Polin (4) - 14:31
Brach Tiller (33 saves / 38 shots)		Goalie stats	Peter Megariotis (5 saves / 7 shots); Max Milosek (25 saves / 25 shots)

Port Huron wins series 3 – 1

==== (N2) Kalamazoo Jr. K-Wings vs. (N3) Traverse City North Stars ====
April 6	Kalamazoo Jr. K-Wings	4 – 0	Traverse City North Stars	Wings West
0:58 - Brandon Flood (1)		First period	No scoring
6:40 - Robbie Payne (1)		Second period	No scoring
7:44 - Jacob McDowell (1); 8:20 - Austin Hervey (1)		Third period	No scoring
Kenneth McLean (25 saves / 25 shots)		Goalie stats	Kyle Laslo (22 saves / 26 shots)

April 7	Kalamazoo Jr. K-Wings	7 – 3	Traverse City North Stars	Wings West
12:57 - pp - Andrew Graves (1)		First period	Sean Murphy (1) - 1:15; Nathan Harris (1) - 15:07
1:31 - pp - Chris Leone (1); 3:38 - Jacob McDowell (2); 11:27 - Andrew Graves (2); 16:21 - Jacob McDowell (2)		Second period	Eric Rivard (1) - 7:07
4:08 - Robbie Payne (2); 18:48 - Jacob McDowell (3)		Third period	No scoring
Alex Okicki (26 saves / 29 shots)		Goalie stats	Kyle Laslo (24 saves / 31 shots)

April 13	Traverse City North Stars	6 – 2	Kalamazoo Jr. K-Wings	Centre ICE Arena
16:35 - pp - Sean Murphy (2)		First period	No scoring
6:21 - pp - Sean Murphy (3); 9:42 - Jared VanWormer (1)		Second period	Robbie Payne (2) - pp - 11:24; Brandon Flood (2) - pp - 11:44
1:59 - sh - Sean Murphy (4); 4:48 - Will Badner (1); 5:07 - Chris Leibinger (1)		Third period	No scoring
Kyle Laslo (29 saves / 31 shots)		Goalie stats	Kenneth McLean (15 saves / 21 shots); Alex Okicki (3 saves / 3 shots)

April 14	Traverse City North Stars	2 – 3	OT	Kalamazoo Jr. K-Wings	Centre ICE Arena
No scoring		First period		No scoring
2:23 - Will Badner (2); 11:58 - Seth Adams (1)		Second period		Brett Beauvais (1) - 6:23; Danny Hamburg (1) - 17:10
No scoring		Third period		No scoring
No scoring		First overtime period		Andrew Graves (3) - 8:13
Kyle Laslo (29 saves / 32 shots)		Goalie stats		Alex Okicki (37 saves / 39 shots)

Kalamazoo wins series 3 – 1

=== South Division ===
==== (S1) Amarillo Bulls vs. (S4) Odessa Jackalopes ====
April 6	Amarillo Bulls	5 – 2	Odessa Jackalopes	Amarillo Civic Center
6:31 - pp - Mike Davis (1); 12:44 - Brooks Behling (1); 14:56 - Luke Jenkins (1)		First period	Tyler Minx (1) - 4:29
6:53 - Mike Davis (2)		Second period	No scoring
10:51 - Geoff Fortman (1)		Third period	Darren Lapic (1) - 8:10
Mike Taffe (25 saves / 27 shots)		Goalie stats	Connor Hellebuyck (47 saves / 52 shots)

April 7	Amarillo Bulls	1 – 5	Odessa Jackalopes	Amarillo Civic Center
No scoring		First period	Taylor Portner (1) - 6:57; Lawrence Cornellier (1) - 11:55
18:24 - John Gustafsson (1)		Second period	No scoring
No scoring		Third period	Alex Ostrowski (1) - 8:25; Ryan Doucet (1) - 9:54; Tyller Robert (1) - 12:36
Gregg Gruehl (24 saves / 29 shots)		Goalie stats	Connor Hellebuyck (49 saves / 50 shots)

April 9	Odessa Jackalopes	3 – 4	OT	Amarillo Bulls	Ector County Coliseum
11:55 - Tyler Cayemberg (1); 12:55 - Tyller Robert (2)		First period		No scoring
6:24 - Willie Faust (1)		Second period		Luke Jenkins (2) - pp - 1:08; John Gustafsson (2) - 3:56
No scoring		Third period		Omar Mullan (1) - 18:44
No scoring		First overtime period		John Gustafsson (3) - 2:59
Connor Hellebuyck (61 saves / 65 shots)		Goalie stats		Mike Taffe (21 saves / 24 shots)

April 10	Odessa Jackalopes	1 – 4	Amarillo Bulls	Ector County Coliseum
No scoring		First period	Mike Davis (3) - 9:23
16:22 - pp - Lawrence Cornellier (2)		Second period	Greg Gibson (1) - 2:03; Mike Erickson (1) - sh - 16:53
No scoring		Third period	Ryan Cole (1) - pp - 12:44
Connor Hellebuyck (42 saves / 46 shots)		Goalie stats	Gregg Gruehl (22 saves / 23 shots)

Amarillo wins series 3 – 1

==== (S2) Texas Tornado vs. (S3) Topeka RoadRunners ====
April 6	Texas Tornado	1 – 2	OT	Topeka RoadRunners	Dr Pepper Arena
19:59 - pp - Marc Biggs (1)		First period		No scoring
No scoring		Second period		Kevin Patterson (1) - pp - 11:37
No scoring		Third period		No scoring
No scoring		First overtime period		Jake Lynes (1) - 12:04
Hunter Leisner (20 saves / 22 shots)		Goalie stats		Peter Traber (25 saves / 26 shots)

April 7	Texas Tornado	2 – 4	Topeka RoadRunners	Dr Pepper Arena
No scoring		First period	Jake Lynes (2) - 14:59
8:00 - pp - Mychal Monteith (1)		Second period	Sean Gaffney (1) - 3:08
2:22 - Andrew Mayer (1)		Third period	Jake Lynes (3) - 12:34; Kyle Sharkey (1) - en - 19:49
Hunter Leisner (5 saves / 7 shots); Joakim Jutras (12 saves / 13 shots)		Goalie stats	Peter Traber (20 saves / 22 shots)

April 12	Topeka RoadRunners	4 – 3	OT	Texas Tornado	Stormont Vail Events Center
6:41 - Kyle Sharkey (2)		First period		No scoring
14:49 - Kevin Patterson (2)		Second period		Jordan Lovick (1) - 11:09
16:32 - Kevin Patterson (3)		Third period		Jordan Lovick (2) - 0:59; Jordan Lovick (3) - 8:01
3:07 - Richard Young (1)		First overtime period		No scoring
Peter Traber (25 saves / 28 shots)		Goalie stats		Joakim Jutras (14 saves / 18 shots)

Topeka wins series 3 – 0

=== West Division ===
==== (W1) Fairbanks Ice Dogs vs. (W4) Kenai River Brown Bears ====
April 6	Fairbanks Ice Dogs	3 – 0	Kenai River Brown Bears	Big Dipper Ice Arena
No scoring		First period	No scoring
14:14 - Garret Clemment (1); 17:39 - Tayler Munson (1)		Second period	No scoring
13:05 - pp - Anton Racklin (1)		Third period	No scoring
Alex Fons (28 saves / 28 shots)		Goalie stats	Austin Severson (27 saves / 30 shots)

April 7	Fairbanks Ice Dogs	4 – 0	Kenai River Brown Bears	Big Dipper Ice Arena
13:26 - Tayler Munson (2)		First period	No scoring
12:19 - Justin Woods (1); 16:19 - pp - Anton Racklin (2)		Second period	No scoring
13:54 - Garret Clemment (2)		Third period	No scoring
Alex Fons (23 saves / 23 shots)		Goalie stats	Austin Severson (26 saves / 30 shots)

April 13	Kenai River Brown Bears	2 – 3	Fairbanks Ice Dogs	Soldotna Regional Sports Complex
No scoring		First period	Gabe Levin (1) - 17:50; Rudy Sulmonte (1) - 19:37
16:13 - pp - Matt Thompson (1)		Second period	No scoring
19:53 - Sean Muller (1)		Third period	Pavel Padakin (1) - 7:32
Austin Severson (24 saves / 27 shots)		Goalie stats	Steve Perry (29 saves / 31 shots)

Fairbanks wins series 3 – 0

==== (W2) Wenatchee Wild vs. (W3) Alaska Avalanche ====
April 5	Wenatchee Wild	4 – 1	Alaska Avalanche	Town Toyota Center
2:22 - Blake Saylor (1); 16:19 - pp - Blake Roubos (1)		First period	No scoring
7:20 - pp - Shawn Pauly (1)		Second period	Evan Janssen (1) - pp - 0:34
19:20 - pp - en - Parker Johnson (1)		Third period	No scoring
Robert Nichols (26 saves / 27 shots)		Goalie stats	Nick Kulmanovsky (15 saves / 18 shots)

April 6	Wenatchee Wild	1 – 2	OT	Alaska Avalanche	Town Toyota Center
No scoring		First period		No scoring
7:17 - pp - Chris Kerr (1)		Second period		No scoring
No scoring		Third period		Jeff Bergh (1) - 15:44
No scoring		First overtime period		Patrick Kinkopf (1) - 1:33
Greg Lewis (30 saves / 32 shots)		Goalie stats		Bodhi Engum (16 saves / 17 shots)

April 7	Alaska Avalanche	3 – 2	2OT	Wenatchee Wild	Curtis D. Menard Memorial Sports Center
No scoring		First period		Trace Redmond (1) - 10:43
13:03 - Evan Hesse (1); 16:26 - Connor Wright (1)		Second period		No scoring
No scoring		Third period		Blake Roubos (2) - 17:15
19:41 - Jordan Watt (1)		Second overtime period		No scoring
Bodhi Engum (43 saves / 45 shots)		Goalie stats		Robert Nichols (38 saves / 41 shots)

April 13	Alaska Avalanche	1 – 7	Wenatchee Wild	Curtis D. Menard Memorial Sports Center
No scoring		First period	No scoring
11:01 - Wehebe Darge (1)		Second period	Blake Roubos (3) - 13:55; Max McHugh (1) - 18:55
No scoring		Third period	Blake Roubos (4) - pp - 8:39; Ben Carey (1) - 9:37; Kyle Huson (1) - pp - 9:57; Blake Roubos (5) - pp - 14:29; Matt Cope (1) - pp - 19:48
Bodhi Engum (20 saves / 24 shots); Nick Kulmanovsky (5 saves / 8 shots)		Goalie stats	Greg Lewis (22 saves / 23 shots)

April 14	Wenatchee Wild	2 – 1	OT	Alaska Avalanche	Town Toyota Center
No scoring		First period		No scoring
17:47 - Blake Roubos (6)		Second period		Wehebe Darge (2) - 18:02
No scoring		Third period		No scoring
8:46 - Evan Schmidbauer (1)		First overtime period		No scoring
Greg Lewis (30 saves / 31 shots)		Goalie stats		Bodhi Engum (27 saves / 29 shots)

Wenatchee wins series 3 – 2

== Division Finals ==
=== Central Division ===
==== (C1) Bismarck Bobcats vs. (C3) Austin Bruins ====
April 20	Bismarck Bobcats	6 – 3	Austin Bruins	V.F.W. Sports Center
5:12 - pp - Tyler Richter (3); 6:43 - Castan Sommer (5)		First period	John Kirby (2) - pp - 8:53
3:35 - pp - Castan Sommer (6); 11:57 - John Furgele (1); 18:31 - Frankie DeAugustine (2)		Second period	John Simonson (2) - 2:18
2:13 - Ryan Callahan (1)		Third period	John Simonson (3) - 12:28
Aaron Nelson (28 saves / 31 shots)		Goalie stats	Tyler Bruggeman (39 saves / 45 shots)

April 21	Bismarck Bobcats	3 – 4	OT	Austin Bruins	V.F.W. Sports Center
4:41 - Buster Hebda (2)		First period		Brandon Wahlin (2) - 8:45
0:44 - pp - Shane Omdahl (4); 6:32 - Shane Omdahl (5)		Second period		Brandon Wahlin (3) - 5:36; Brandon Wahlin (4) - 17:39
No scoring		Third period		No scoring
No scoring		First overtime period		Joe Siers (1) - 8:13
Aaron Nelson (27 saves / 31 shots)		Goalie stats		Tyler Bruggeman (24 saves / 27 shots)

April 27	Austin Bruins	2 – 3	Bismarck Bobcats	Riverside Arena
No scoring		First period	Castan Sommer (7) - 15:38
No scoring		Second period	Patrick Moore (1) - pp - 12:32; Adam Knochenmus (3) - 18:54
9:05 - Chris Fischer (2); 18:31 - A.J. Reid (1)		Third period	No scoring
Tyler Bruggeman (17 saves / 20 shots)		Goalie stats	Aaron Nelson (23 saves / 25 shots)

April 28	Austin Bruins	1 – 4	Bismarck Bobcats	Riverside Arena
8:14 - pp - Chris Fischer (3)		First period	Adam Knochenmus (4) - pp - 15:01
		Second period	Patrick Moore (2) - 1:06
No scoring		Third period	Buster Hebda (3) - 10:07; Tyler Richter (4) - en - 19:28
Tyler Bruggeman (33 saves / 36 shots)		Goalie stats	Aaron Nelson (29 saves / 30 shots)

Bismarck wins series 3 – 1

=== Midwest Division ===
==== (MW1) St. Louis Bandits vs. (MW3) Springfield Jr. Blues ====
April 20	St. Louis Bandits	8 – 1	Springfield Jr. Blues	Hardee's Iceplex
13:49 - Rance Hughes (3)		First period	Josef Pontasch (1) - 19:39
2:49 - pp - Joseph Birmingham (3); 8:42 - Drew Slaton (2); 12:10 - Rance Hughes (4); 16:49 - Joseph Birmingham (4)		Second period	No scoring
2:49 - Ryan Stouffer (2); 4:48 - pp - Joe Kalisz (5); 17:30 - pp - Stephen Bopp (1)		Third period	No scoring
Tyler Green (25 saves / 26 shots)		Goalie stats	Gabe Antoni (20 saves / 24 shots); Tyler Parks (8 saves / 12 shots)

April 21	St. Louis Bandits	0 – 1	Springfield Jr. Blues	Hardee's Iceplex
No scoring		First period	No scoring
No scoring		Second period	Garrett Williams (2) - 2:59
No scoring		Third period	No scoring
Spencer Viele (14 saves / 15 shots)		Goalie stats	Gabe Antoni (34 saves / 34 shots)

April 27	Springfield Jr. Blues	2 – 3	St. Louis Bandits	Nelson Center
No scoring		First period	No scoring
19:32 - Josef Pontasch (2)		Second period	Cody Ganchar (1) - 13:58; Josh Dangel (1) - pp - 16:42
19:43 - pp - Kevin Walters (1)		Third period	Luc Boby (1) - 4:39
Gabe Antoni (31 saves / 34 shots)		Goalie stats	Spencer Viele (31 saves / 33 shots)

April 28	Springfield Jr. Blues	3 – 5	St. Louis Bandits	Nelson Center
11:01 - Chris Sitler (3)		First period	Ryan Zehnder (1) - 14:19
No scoring		Second period	Frank DiChiara (3) - 3:18; Luc Boby (2) - 13:23; Greg Johnson (1) - pp - 19:29
1:46 - Josef Pontasch (2)		Third period	Drew Kariofiles (1) - en - 19:26
Gabe Antoni (24 saves / 28 shots)		Goalie stats	Spencer Viele (26 saves / 29 shots)

St. Louis wins series 3 – 1

=== North Division ===
==== (N1) Port Huron Fighting Falcons vs. (N2) Kalamazoo Jr. K-Wings ====
April 20	Port Huron Fighting Falcons	4 – 2	Kalamazoo Jr. K-Wings	McMorran Place
19:40 - Joe Pizza (2)		First period	Nick Kovalchik (1) - 10:10
12:37 - Kody Polin (5)		Second period	Kyle Gattelaro (1) - 10:49
1:49 - Jake Goldberg (2); 19:17 - en - Nicholas Sierra (2)		Third period	No scoring
Max Milosek (27 saves / 29 shots)		Goalie stats	Alex Okicki (28 saves / 31 shots)

April 21	Port Huron Fighting Falcons	5 – 2	Kalamazoo Jr. K-Wings	McMorran Place
4:36 - Alex Archibald (1); 18:48 - sh - Brett D'Andrea (1)		First period	No scoring
4:20 - Ryan Teal (1); 13:41 - Mike Moroso (3)		Second period	No scoring
10:39 - Mike Moroso (4)		Third period	Andrew Graves (4) - pp - 0:39; Brett Beauvais (2) - pp - 14:44
Max Milosek (27 saves / 29 shots)		Goalie stats	Kenneth MacLean (25 saves / 30 shots)

April 26	Kalamazoo Jr. K-Wings	2 – 1	OT	Port Huron Fighting Falcons	Wings West
2:28 - Christian George (1)		First period		No scoring
No scoring		Second period		No scoring
No scoring		Third period		Sean Gammage (1) - 16:38
3:05 - Christian George (2)		First overtime period		No scoring
Kenneth MacLean (38 saves / 39 shots)		Goalie stats		Peter Megariotis (35 saves / 37 shots)

April 27	Kalamazoo Jr. K-Wings	0 – 4	Port Huron Fighting Falcons	Wings West
No scoring		First period	Easton Powers (2) - 14:19
No scoring		Second period	Ian Miller (2) - pp - 4:25; Mike Moroso (5) - 7:31
No scoring		Third period	Rick DeRosa (1) - en - 17:37
Alex Okicki (25 saves / 28 shots)		Goalie stats	Max Milosek (31 saves / 31 shots)

Port Huron wins series 3 – 1

=== South Division ===
==== (S1) Amarillo Bulls vs. (S3) Topeka Roadrunners ====
April 20	Amarillo Bulls	8 – 6	Topeka Roadrunners	Amarillo Civic Center
6:56 - John Rey (1)		First period	Ben Bahe (1) - 7:39; Kyle Sharkey (3) - 10:42; Ben Bahe (2) - 12:38
10:53 - Greg Gibson (2); 15:26 - Ryan Cole (2); 16:56 - pp - T.J. Sarcona (1); 18:01 - pp - Luke Jenkins (3); 19:07 - Brooks Behling (2)		Second period	Brian Christie (1) - 5:33; Jake Lynes (4) - 6:25
3:30 - pp - Ryan Taylor (1); 20:00 - en - Luke Jenkins (4)		Third period	Ben Bahe (3) - 1:40
Mike Taffe (18 saves / 22 shots); Gregg Gruehl (4 saves / 6 shots)		Goalie stats	Peter Traber (27 saves / 34 shots); Collin LeMay (0 saves / 0 shots)

April 21	Amarillo Bulls	3 – 0	Topeka Roadrunners	Amarillo Civic Center
No scoring		First period	No scoring
8:00 - pp - Karl Beckman (1)		Second period	No scoring
9:52 - sh - Brooks Behling (3); 11:56 - Brooks Behling (4)		Third period	No scoring
Gregg Gruehl (33 saves / 33 shots)		Goalie stats	Peter Traber (39 saves / 42 shots); Collin LeMay (0 saves / 0 shots)

April 26	Topeka Roadrunners	6 – 3	Amarillo Bulls	Stormont Vail Events Center
No scoring		First period	Omar Mullan (2) - 4:36; John Rey (2) - 6:54
8:45 - pp - Trace Strahle (1); 9:48 - Brian Christie (2); 10:16 - Chris Bond (1)		Second period	Omar Mullen (3) - 3:43
5:33 - Ryan White (1); 12:09 - pp - Kyle Sharkey (4); 16:42 - Ryan White (2)		Third period	No scoring
Peter Traber (22 saves / 25 shots)		Goalie stats	Mike Taffe (30 saves / 36 shots)

April 27	Topeka Roadrunners	1 – 3	Amarillo Bulls	Stormont Vail Events Center
14:28 - Ryan White (3)		First period	No scoring
No scoring		Second period	No scoring
No scoring		Third period	Mike Erickson (2) - 12:41; T.J. Sarcona (2) - 17:44; Matt Johnson (1) - en - 19:59
Peter Traber (27 saves / 29 shots)		Goalie stats	Gregg Gruehl (25 saves / 26 shots)

Amarillo wins series 3 – 1

=== West Division ===
==== (W1) Fairbanks Ice Dogs vs. (W2) Wenatchee Wild ====
April 20	Fairbanks Ice Dogs	5 – 2	Wenatchee Wild	Big Dipper Ice Arena
17:55 - Max Birkinbine (1)		First period	Ben Carey (2) - 2:53; Jerad Tafoya (2) - 15:22
19:45 - Max Birkinbine (2)		Second period	No scoring
5:50 - Alec Hajdukovich (1); 8:17 - Jeff Earnest (1); 13:27 - Tayler Munson (2)		Third period	No scoring
Alex Fons (18 saves / 20 shots)		Goalie stats	Robert Nichols (24 saves / 29 shots)

April 21	Fairbanks Ice Dogs	2 – 1	OT	Wenatchee Wild	Big Dipper Ice Arena
3:17 - Pavel Padakin (2)		First period		No scoring
No scoring		Second period		Jerad Tafoya (3) - 16:43
No scoring		Third period		No scoring
5:20 - Max Birkinbine (3)		First overtime period		No scoring
Alex Fons (18 saves / 19 shots)		Goalie stats		Greg Lewis (34 saves / 36 shots)

April 26	Wenatchee Wild	1 – 3	Fairbanks Ice Dogs	Town Toyota Center
No scoring		First period	Gabe Levin (2) - 8:31
No scoring		Second period	Garret Clemment (3) - sh - 15:56
19:09 - Trace Redmond (2)		Third period	Alec Hajdukovich (2) - 15:53
Greg Lewis (29 saves / 32 shots)		Goalie stats	Alex Fons (24 saves / 25 shots)

Fairbanks wins series 3 – 1

== Quarterfinal ==
=== May 3 ===
St. Louis Bandits	3 – 1	Fairbanks Ice Dogs	Dr. Pepper Arena
No scoring	First period	Tayler Munson (3) - 0:35
2:30 - Ryan Stouffer (3); 3:44 - Joesph Birmingham (5)	Second period	No scoring
7:53 - pp - Rance Hughes (5)	Third period	No scoring
Spencer Viele (32 saves / 33 shots)	Goalie stats	Alex Fons (22 saves / 25 shots)

Port Huron Fighting Falcons	5 – 1	Bismarck Bobcats	Dr. Pepper Arena
Kody Polin (6) - 4:48	First period	10:17 - Bryce Schmitt (1)
Maxwell Reavis (2) - 0:33; Mike Moroso (6) - 10:12	Second period	No scoring
Joe Pizza (3) - 4:43; Ian Miller (3) - 14:35	Third period	No scoring
Max Milosek (17 saves / 18 shots)	Goalie stats	Aaron Nelson (8 saves / 12 shots); Tommy Burke (7 saves / 8 shots)

Amarillo Bulls	3 – 2	OT	Texas Tornado	Dr Pepper Arena
No scoring	First period		Jordan Lovick (4) - 4:39
6:35 - Mike Davis (4)	Second period		Taylor Herndon (1) - pp - 19:25
5:37 - pp - Karl Beckman (2)	Third period		No scoring
3:06 - Greg Gibson (3)	First overtime period		No scoring
Gregg Gruehl (26 saves / 28 shots)	Goalie stats		Hunter Leisner (29 saves / 32 shots)

=== May 4 ===
Bismarck Bobcats	3 – 2	St. Louis Bandits	Dr. Pepper Arena
No scoring	First period	Joe Kalisz (6) - 6:06
15:55 - Donald Olivieri (1)	Second period	Joe Kalisz (7) - 17:54
7:28 - Shane Omdahl (6); 10:15 - Adam Knochenmus (5)	Third period	No scoring
Tommy Burke (22 saves / 24 shots)	Goalie stats	Spencer Viele (22 saves / 25 shots)

Fairbanks Ice Dogs	3 – 1	Amarillo Bulls	Dr. Pepper Arena
No scoring	First period	No scoring
Anton Racklin (3) - pp - 6:21; Pete Spratte (1) - 13:57	Second period	10:50 - pp - Greg Gibson (2)
Tayler Munson (3) - 10:23	Third period
Steve Perry (20 saves / 21 shots)	Goalie stats	Gregg Gruehl (21 saves / 24 shots)

Port Huron Fighting Falcons	4 – 5	Texas Tornado	Dr. Pepper Arena
Brett D'Andrea (2) - 3:32; Mike Moroso (7) - 5:33; Nolan Valleau (1) - pp - 17:27	First period	8:41 - Drew Allen (1); 9:02 - Mico Solorzano (1); 16:08 - pp - Jackson Leef (1)
No scoring	Second period	8:27 - Jackson Leef (2); 12:21 - Jordan Lovick (4)
Logan Lemirande (2) - 5:45	Third period	No scoring
Max Milosek (29 saves / 34 shots)	Goalie stats	Hunter Leisner (15 saves / 19 shots)

=== May 5 ===
Amarillo Bulls	6 – 2	Bismarck Bobcats	Dr. Pepper Arena
11:34 - Mike Davis (5)	First period	No scoring
0:52 - sh - Joe Kozlak (1); 6:52 - Tyler Deresky (1); 18:32 - Joe Kozlak (2)	Second period	Frankie DeAugustine (6) - 2:07; Donald Olivieri (2) - 5:17
19:48 - en - Brooks Behling (5); 19:57 - Mike Davis (6)	Third period	No scoring
Mike Taffe (25 saves / 27 shots)	Goalie stats	Tommy Burke (33 saves / 38 shots)

Fairbanks Ice Dogs	4 – 3	Port Huron Fighting Falcons	Dr. Pepper Arena
4:19 - Garret Clemment (4)	First period	Mike Moroso (8) - 11:36; Mitch Sand (1) - pp - 7:03
5:32 - Gabe Levin (3)	Second period	Logan Lemirande (3) - 7:54
4:45 - Pavel Padakin (3); 5:38 - Evan Wilson (1)	Third period	No scoring
Steve Perry (23 saves / 26 shots)	Goalie stats	Max Milosek (31 saves / 35 shots)

St. Louis Bandits	3 – 2	OT	Texas Tornado	Dr Pepper Arena
No scoring	First period		Mico Solorzano (2) - 3:16
No scoring	Second period		No scoring
17:14 - Joe Kalisz (8); 19:10 - Frank DiChiara (4)	Third period		Taylor Herndon (2) - 15:37
4:31 - Cody Ganchar (2)	First overtime period		No scoring
Spencer Viele (30 saves / 32 shots)	Goalie stats		Hunter Leisner (25 saves / 28 shots)

== Semifinals ==
=== (S1) Amarillo Bulls vs. (MW1) St. Louis Bandits ===
May 7	Amarillo Bulls	2 – 3	St. Louis Bandits	Dr. Pepper Arena
2:55 - Karl Beckman (3); 10:07 - John Gustafsson (4)		First period	Drew Slaton (3) - 7:52
No scoring		Second period	No scoring
No scoring		Third period	Stephen Bopp (3) - 3:55; Joe Kalisz (9) - 4:58
Mike Taffe (21 saves / 24 shots)		Goalie stats	Spencer Viele (23 saves / 25 shots)

=== (W1) Fairbanks Ice Dogs vs. (S2) Texas Tornado ===
May 7	Fairbanks Ice Dogs	3 – 4	OT	Texas Tornado	Dr. Pepper Arena
8:03 - Alec Hajdukovich (3); 19:04 - Rudy Sulmonte (2)		First period		Skyler Spiller (1) - 12:36
No scoring		Second period		Andrew Mayer (2) - 3:31
9:58 - Anton Racklin (4)		Third period		Justin Greenberg (1) - 14:59
No scoring		First overtime period		Drew Allen (2) - 16:39
Alex Fons (31 saves / 35 shots)		Goalie stats		Hunter Leisner (23 saves / 26 shots)

== Robertson Cup Finals ==
=== (MW1) St. Louis Bandits vs (S2) Texas Tornado ===
May 8	St. Louis Bandits	3 – 4	OT	Texas Tornado	Dr. Pepper Arena
No scoring		First period		Marc Biggs (2) - 18:08
3:27 - pp - Joe Kalisz (10); 15:24 - Stephen Bopp (3); 17:18 - Drew Kariofiles (2)		Second period		Mitchell McPherson (1) - 14:20
No scoring		Third period		Jordan Lovick (6) - 14:26
No scoring		First overtime period		Justin Greenberg (2) - 4:26
Spencer Viele (34 saves / 38 shots)		Goalie stats		Hunter Leisner (19 saves / 22 shots)

== Playoff scoring leaders ==
Note: GP = Games played; G = Goals; A = Assists; PTS = Points; PIM = Penalty minutes

Player	Team	GP	G	A	PTS	PIM
Joe Kalisz	St. Louis Bandits	12	10	11	21	2
Castan Sommer	Bismarck Bobcats	11	7	6	13	6
Tyler Richter	Bismarck Bobcats	11	6	6	12	8
Chris Sitler	Springfield Jr. Blues	9	3	9	12	10
Frankie DeAugustine	Bismarck Bobcats	11	3	9	12	6
Jordan Lovick	Texas Tornado	8	6	5	11	0
Shane Omdahl	Bismarck Bobcats	11	6	5	11	8
Alec Hajdukovich	Fairbanks Ice Dogs	10	3	8	11	4
Joseph Birmingham	St. Louis Bandits	10	5	5	10	2
Blake Roubos	Wenatchee Wild	14	6	3	9	10
Adam Knochenmus	Bismarck Bobcats	11	5	4	9	4
Rance Hughes	St. Louis Bandits	12	5	4	9	2
Kyle Cook	Springfield Jr. Blues	9	4	5	9	12
Logan Lemirande	Port Huron Fighting Falcons	11	3	6	9	29
Karl Beckman	Amarillo Bulls	12	3	6	9	6
Brian Christie	Topeka RoadRunners	7	2	7	9	4
Easton Powers	Port Huron Fighting Falcons	11	2	7	9	4
John Rey	Amarillo Bulls	12	2	7	9	15
Mike Erickson	Amarillo Bulls	12	2	7	9	6
Cody Ganchar	St. Louis Bandits	12	2	7	9	2
Josh Dangel	St. Louis Bandits	12	1	8	9	0

== Playoff leading goaltenders ==
Note: GP = Games played; MIN = Minutes played; W = Wins; L = Losses; SO = Shutouts; GA = Goals Allowed; GAA = Goals against average; SV% = Save percentage

Player	Team	GP	MIN	W	L	SO	GA	GAA	SV%
Tyler Green	St. Louis Bandits	4	592	4	0	2	2	0.50	0.978
Alex Fons	Fairbanks Ice Dogs	7	442	5	1	2	11	1.49	0.937
Michael Bitzer	Alexandria Blizzard	2	120	1	1	1	3	1.50	0.958
Greg Lewis	Wenatchee Wild	5	316	2	1	0	9	1.71	0.942
Bodhi Engum	Alaska Avalanche	4	106	2	1	0	9	1.93	0.922
