= Dawson Creek Rage =

Ice hockey team in British Columbia

- City: Dawson Creek, British Columbia
- League: NAHL
- Division: West
- Operated: 2010–2012
- Home arena: EnCana Events Centre
- Colors: Orange, Black, & White
- Owner(s): DC Rage Hockey Society

Franchise history
- 2010–2012: Dawson Creek Rage
- 2015–2020: Wilkes-Barre/Scranton Knights
- 2020–present: Danbury Jr. Hat Tricks

The Dawson Creek Rage (aka DC Rage) were a Tier II Junior A ice hockey team, based out of Dawson Creek, British Columbia. Formed in 2010, they played in the North American Hockey League's West Division for two seasons. Their 2010–11 season included a six-game win streak, though they ended the season fifth in a six team division with 24 wins in 58 games. The 2011–12 season included an 11-game homestand in which they only won 2 games, and a last place finish (in their division) with only 12 wins overall. With losing records in both seasons, the team did not make the playoffs in either season. Despite attracting better than average attendance for a NAHL team, high travelling and operating costs resulted in the team ceasing operations in April 2012.

The Rage played in the 4,500 seat EnCana Events Centre where their first win came on September 24, 2010, against the Alaska Avalanche. Their final home game was a loss to the Wenatchee Wild in March 2012. The team's name and symbol was intended to represent an outward expression of passion and internal desire to dominate other teams. The Rage players, all aged between 15 and 20 years old in accordance with league rules, were active with charities and within the community. Prior to the team's formation, the ownership group attempted to establish the team in the British Columbia Hockey League but were refused with the league citing the lack of a competitive base for a northern division. The group also attempted to establish the team in the Alberta Junior Hockey League but that league was not interested in expanding or re-locating teams at that time. Another unsuccessful attempt at moving the team to either of those league was made before their dissolution.

== Formation ==
Dawson Creek was last home to a Junior A hockey team in the 1980s when the Dawson Creek Kodiaks of the Peace-Cariboo Junior Hockey League spent time at the equivalent level. While the Kodiaks ended operations in 1990, a new Junior A team was proposed in 2006 by Global Spectrum, the contracted management company responsible for operating the city's new South Peace Community Multiplex which included the EnCana Events Centre, capable of hosting ice hockey events with a seating capacity of 4,500 people. The objective was to create an anchor tenant which could help fill the Multiplex's schedule with several dozen home games per year. The company recruited several Dawson Creek-based businessmen to form a non-profit society (eventually named the DC Rage Society) that would fund the start-up of the team. To add credibility to their application, Dawson Creek resident Rob Bremner, who was the head coach of the Junior A-level Vernon Vipers when they won the 1996 Royal Bank Cup, was appointed the General Manager of the team and tasked with recruiting potential players.

The group first approached the British Columbia Hockey League with the intention of creating a new franchise for the 2007–08 season, which came with a $400,000 expansion franchise fee. While the Multiplex arena was well over the BCHL's minimum requirement of a 1,500-seat arena, the Society estimated the franchise would need an average attendance of 1,200-1,500 tickets sold to cover operational costs. At the same time, the group pursued entry into the Alberta Junior Hockey League, which had a $250,000 franchise fee, even though AJHL communicated they had no intention of expanding until at least 2011. As the BCHL also communicated they were not interested in expansion at that time, the group additionally pursued relocation of an existing team to Dawson Creek. However, at a late-2006 meeting, the BCHL board of governors voted to not accept the Dawson Creek application as a potential site for a team, citing delays with the construction of the Multiplex arena and a question over compensation for the expenses of visiting teams. On appeal, the BCHL reversed this decision two months later and actively considered both Dawson Creek and Wenatchee, Washington, as possible sites for a requested relocation of the Williams Lake TimberWolves. The BCHL noted two concerns with a Dawson Creek team: the cost and time of travel required (at the time the league's most northerly team was the Prince George Spruce Kings) to reach the city and the lack of a rival team. To address these concerns, the Society attempted to initiate a Fort St. John team, as well, who would be a rival to Dawson Creek and enable a northern division within the BCHL.

At their 2007 meeting, the BCHL board of governors rejected moving the Williams Lake TimberWolves to Dawson Creek, but then voted to allow the move if the Burnaby Express (who was also seeking relocation) moved to Fort St. John. However, the Society was not able to recruit sufficient support in Fort St. John to form an ownership group and the Burnaby Express re-arranged its management and ownership so that it could stay in Burnaby. The Williams Lake TimberWolves, after one year of dormancy, relocated to Wenatchee, Washington. Efforts at relocating an Alberta Junior Hockey League team were also unsuccessful as no team expressed interest in moving at that time.

Over the next year, still seeking a league, the US-based North American Hockey League, which was looking to expand, was approached as a possibility. In an April 2009 announcement, they accepted the Dawson Creek franchise, which would be the only Canadian team in the league and the first since the Fernie Ghostriders left the league in 2004 to become a Junior B team. The ownership group agreed to pay the $400,000 franchise fee with the team entering the league for the 2010–11 season with 31 home games to be played in the Multiplex each season. The local government, the City of Dawson Creek, agreed to contribute $675,000 over 3 years to help establish the team as a reliable tenant for the Multiplex which was operating at a loss due to the lack of events. The team, now known as the Dawson Creek Rage, selected Scott Robinson, a former BCHL coach of the year, to lead the new team as its general manager and head coach. To recruit and evaluate potential players (aged 15–20), they held Spring 2010 try-out camps in Princeton, Abbotsford and Dawson Creek which attracted about 200 players.

== Team history ==
=== 2010–11 season ===
With the roster filled, the team debuted at a late-August 2010 exhibition tournament, Face Off Fever 2, where Dawson Creek hosted the Prince George Spruce Kings and Quesnel Millionaires of the BCHL and the Grande Prairie Storm of the AJHL. The NAHL 2010–11 season began at the Showcase Tournament, held Minneapolis in mid-September. The Rage lost their first game 3–0 to the St. Louis Bandits on September 15, but the next day won their second game, in an overtime shoot-out, 2–1 against the Alexandria Blizzard. The team emerged from the tournament with a 1–2–1 record. Returning to Dawson Creek, the Rage held their home-opener in a three-game series against the Alaska Avalanche, losing the first and third games but winning their September 24 game. The Rage also lost two of three games the next weekend against the Kenai River Brown Bears. On their Alaska road trip, they lost three straight to the Avalanche and won three straight against the Brown Bears. In California, the Rage lost both games in a two-game series against the Fresno Monsters and in Washington the Rage lost two of three against the Wenatchee Wild.

Back in Dawson Creek in November, the Rage split a three-game series against the Monsters, 1-1-1, and won both games against the Chicago Hitmen. Following another 6-game road trip to Alaska, the Rage continued into December winning approximately one-in-three games, with an 11–22–2 record near the mid-season break, when they traded their 20-year-old captain, Blaine Bokenfohr, to the Merritt Centennials in exchange for future considerations. Scott Fellnermayr became the new captain of the Rage, and would remain the captain for the remainder of the season and the next. In January, the Rage split two-game series against the Wild and split another in Chicago. The team put together a six-game winning streak in January–February, winning games against the Brown Bears and the Avalanche before splitting a two-game series with the Monsters. On their next road trip, they lost their two games against the Wild and won the next three against the Monsters. The season ended in early March with Rage in fifth place with a 24–31–3 record, in the six-team West division.

Despite the losing record, attendance at the home games averaged over 1,000 people, the tenth highest attendance in the 26-team league. They sent two players to the league's Top Prospects Tournament: goalie Andrew Walsh and the team's top scorer Dakota Mason. The team gave Scott Fellnermayr their most valuable player award and named goalie Edward Dyson their rookie of the year.

In the off-season, with numerous players reaching the league's age limit, the team held open camps in Kelowna and Dawson Creek in April–May 2011 which attracted about 150 potential players. Dakota Mason requested a trade and was sent to the Brooks Bandits for Mitch Chagnon. In pre-season play, the Rage played the Grande Prairie Storm in Peace River, Alberta, in an exhibition fundraiser game called the Tiggo Cup Challenge, with proceeds going towards the North Peace Navigators Junior "B" hockey team. In early September, they split a two-game exhibition series with the Prince George Spruce Kings. In finalizing the roster, the team kept rookie Luke Ripley and veteran Rage defenseman Evan Ripley, allowing the brothers to play on the same team.

=== 2011–12 season ===
The Rage began the 2011–12 season with the NAHL's Showcase Tournament in Michigan where they lost to the Corpus Christi Ice Rays and the Kalamazoo Jr. K-Wings but beat the Michigan Warriors, before ending with a loss to the Coulee Region Chill. They started with a 3–7 record, winning two out of three games against the Minot Minotauros but then losing two games against the Monsters in Fresno and two games against the Bismarck Bobcats in Dawson Creek. Trying to add scoring, they acquired Shawn Mueller from the Chilliwack Chiefs. They fell to 5–13–1 after splitting a series in Minot, losing in Bismarck, and splitting a series against the Alaska Avalanche back in Dawson Creek. Between mid-November and the mid-season break the team played a 12-game road trip, spending the first two weekends in Alaska and the next two in Wenatchee and Fresno, and entered the break last in their division with a 7–24–2 overall record. They acquired defenceman Zach Ovics from the Nanaimo Clippers and goalie Paul Bourbeau from the Kenai River Brown Bears. In a January–February 11 game homestand, the Rage only won 2 games, falling to 9-32-3, as they lost three to the Wild (all shut outs), two each to the Monsters and the Ice Dogs, and split their series against the Avalanche and Brown Bears. The team's struggles continued, losing two games each to the Monsters and the Ice Dogs. Against the Wild, they lost all three games in their homestand which ended with brawl. They ended the season going 1–2 in both Kenai River and Wenatchee and splitting the series against the Alaska Avalanche, 1–1–1. They played their last home game in mid-March losing to the Wenatchee Wild and ending the game with brawl. The Rage ended their season with a road trip, losing both three-game series 2–1 in Kenai River and then Wenatchee. Three players were sent to the NAHL's Top Prospects Showcase: Scott Fellnermayr, Luke Ripley and Josh Hartley.

== Dissolution ==
In early 2011, the Rage along with the Fresno Monsters, Wenatchee Wild, and Alaska Avalanche, all declared dormancy for various reasons, not committing to playing the next season; the Rage were pursuing entry into the AJHL. As the season was ending, the other teams in the division came out of dormancy; the Wenatchee team had their BCHL move denied and the Fresno Monsters were able to secure a lease agreement for their arena. The bid by the DC Rage Society to move the team into the AJHL, by purchasing the rights to the St. Albert Steel, failed as the Steel were moved to Whitecourt. While the team was achieving the expected levels of corporate sponsorship and had an average attendance of 1,010 people (13th best in the league of 28 teams), the Rage's costs (especially the travel costs) were higher than expected. In the first week of April 2012, a final appeal by the DC Rage Society to the City of Dawson Creek to cover certain fees was denied and the society announced the team was ending operations.

== Community ==
The Rage were operated by a Dawson Creek-based non-profit group, the DC Rage Society. They obtained over $200,000 each year in financial support from the City of Dawson Creek who wanted the team to help fill the schedule of their new 6,500-seat arena. Compared to other NAHL teams, the Rage received above average fan support with over 1,000 people attending each game. With few of the players were native to the Peace Region, billet families housed team players while they were in town. The team participated in visits to local elementary schools, hosted meet-and-greets with community members, and fund-raised for the local branch of the Canadian Cancer Society and other charities. Likewise, the community supported the team by fund-raising for pay for general team activities and for a scholarship fund for players going onto university. In August 2011, the team took over hosting duties (from the city's minor hockey association) of Dawson Creek's annual week-long hockey camp in which 95 players attended, as well, in the same month, they hosted an open house for Dawson Creek community members meet the team.

== Uniform ==
In May 2010, the team unveiled their logo and uniform. Designed by a Dawson Creek resident, it featured predominately orange, black, and silver colours stylized as a warrior helmet. The logo was meant to illustrate the team's dominance with the burning eyes representing the rage within. Between seasons, they altered the logo by adding the words "Dawson Creek" and "Rage" with the Canadian maple leaf symbol, replacing the longhorn symbol with a plume on the helmet, eliminating the red colouring, and removing the flames.

== Season records ==
Season	Gm	W	L	OTL	PTS	GF	GA	Finish	Playoffs
2010–11	58	24	31	3	51	160	209	5th of 6, West; 19th of 26, NAHL	Did not qualify
2011–12	60	12	44	4	28	139	264	6th of 6, West; 27th of 28, NAHL	Did not qualify
