= New Mexico Mustangs =

Former junior ice hockey team

- City: Rio Rancho, New Mexico
- League: NAHL
- Division: South
- Founded: 2010
- Home arena: Santa Ana Star Center
- Colors: TBD
- Owner: Ken Dennis
- Affiliates: New Mexico Renegades (WSHL)(lower)

Franchise history
- 2010–2012: New Mexico Mustangs
- 2013–2022: Minnesota Magicians
- 2022–present: Wisconsin Windigo

The New Mexico Mustangs were a Tier II Junior A ice hockey team based out of Rio Rancho, New Mexico that began play in the 2010–11 season. They were a member of the North American Hockey League and played in the South Division. The Mustangs played their home games in the Santa Ana Star Center. The Mustangs were affiliated with the New Mexico Renegades, a Tier III Jr A team in the Western States Hockey League

After the 2011–12 season, the Mustangs suspended operations and granted inactive status by the league. On December 21, 2012, the franchise was purchased and relocated to Richfield, Minnesota, where they are known as the Minnesota Magicians.

== Season records ==
Season	GP	W	L	OTL	PTS	GF	GA	PIM	Finish	Playoffs
2010–11	58	19	35	4	42	141	220	1,268	6th of 6, South; 24th of 26, NAHL	Did not qualify
2011–12	60	18	39	3	39	166	269	947	7th of 7, South; 25th of 28, NAHL	Did not qualify
Totals	118	37	74	7	81	307	489	2,215		
