= Pavel Padakin =

Ukrainian-Russian ice hockey player

- Born: 8 June 1994 (age 31) Kyiv, Ukraine
- Height: 185 cm (6 ft 1 in)
- Weight: 90 kg (198 lb; 14 st 2 lb)
- Position: Right wing
- Shoots: Right
- PHL team Former teams: Polonia Bytom; Lehigh Valley Phantoms; HC Sochi; Neftekhimik Nizhnekamsk; Dornbirner EC; Unia Oswiecim; GKS Tychy; Norfolk Admirals
- National team: Ukraine
- NHL draft: Undrafted
- Playing career: 2015–present

Pavel Dmitrovich Padakin (Ukrainian: Павло Дмитрович Падакін; born 8 June 1994) is a Ukrainian professional ice hockey forward who currently plays for Polonia Bytom of the Polska Hokej Liga (PHL).

== Playing career ==
He played junior hockey for the Calgary Hitmen and Regina Pats of the Western Hockey League, and made his professional debut in the American Hockey League with the Lehigh Valley Phantoms before joining HC Sochi of the Kontinental Hockey League (KHL) in 2016.

After a two-year tenure with HC Neftekhimik Nizhnekamsk, Padakin returned to former club, HC Sochi, agreeing to a one-year deal on 8 May 2020.
