= St. Louis Bandits =

American ice hockey team

- City: Chesterfield, Missouri
- League: NAHL
- Division: Midwest
- Founded: 2003
- Folded: 2012
- Home arena: Hardee's Iceplex
- Colors: Blue, black, and white
- Owners: Michael J. Brooks, Brett Hull, Scott McCuaig, Ben Bishop, Sr., Jeff Cooper and Kelly Chase.
- General manager: Kelly Chase
- Head coach: Jeff Brown
- Asst. coaches: Rocky Russo; Corey Wogtech
- Media: B2 Networks

Franchise history
- 2003–2006: Texarkana Bandits
- 2006–2012: St. Louis Bandits
- 2013–present: Minnesota Wilderness

Championships
- Division titles: 2006–07, 2007–08, 2008–09, 2010–11
- Robertson Cups: 2007, 2008, 2009

The St. Louis Bandits were a Tier II Junior A ice hockey team in the North American Hockey League (NAHL). The team played their home games at the 2,200-seat Hardee's Iceplex (previously Summit Center) in Chesterfield, Missouri. Owners of the St. Louis Bandits include former St. Louis Blues Kelly Chase as well as Scott McCuaig, Ben Bishop, Jr., Jeff Cooper, Michael J. Brooks, and Jon Cooper.

In the Spring of 2013, their franchise rights were sold to the ownership group of the Minnesota Wilderness.

== History ==
The franchise joined the North American Hockey League for the 2003–04 season as the Texarkana Bandits. The team played in Texarkana from 2003 until the summer of 2006 when the team moved to the Greater St. Louis Metro Area. The team moved to the Hardees Ice Complex in Chesterfield, Missouri, filling the void left when the St. Louis Heartland Eagles of the USHL ceased operations at the end of the 2005 season. In 2007 & 2008, head coach and general manager Jon Cooper coached the team to back-to-back Robertson Cup National Championships.

The team has made appearances in the NAHL playoff rounds each of their five years in the NAHL. In 2007 they claimed the South Division title and in 2008 claimed the North Division title. The Bandits moved back to the South Division for the 2008–09 season. They once again moved to the Central Division for the 2010–11 season. The team hosted the Robertson Cup Championships at the Hardee's IcePlex in May 2008 where they became back-to-back National Championships. The 2008–09 season the Bandits headed to Mason City, Iowa for the Robertson Cup Championships and yet again took home the most coveted award in the NAHL. The three-peat was clinched with a 3–2 overtime win against the West Division Champion, Wenatchee Wild.

After going dormant in 2012, the Bandits' franchise rights were sold to the ownership of the Minnesota Wilderness of Cloquet, Minnesota in the Spring of 2013.

== Season records ==
=== Regular season ===
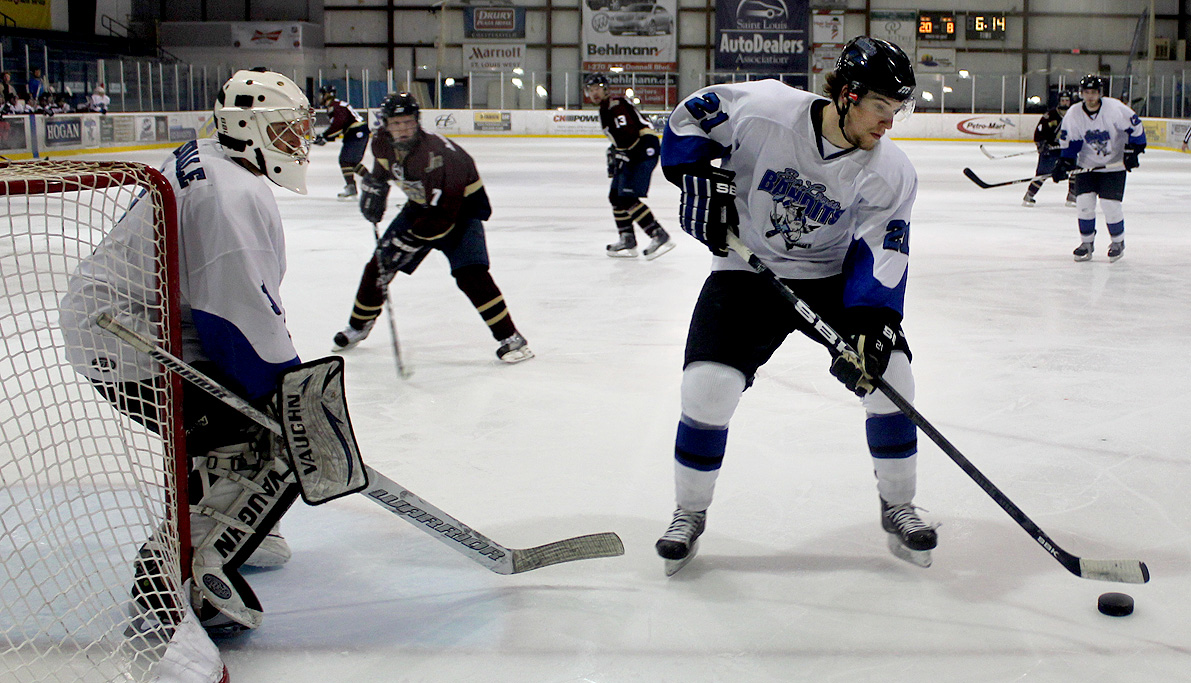
The Bandits 2011.

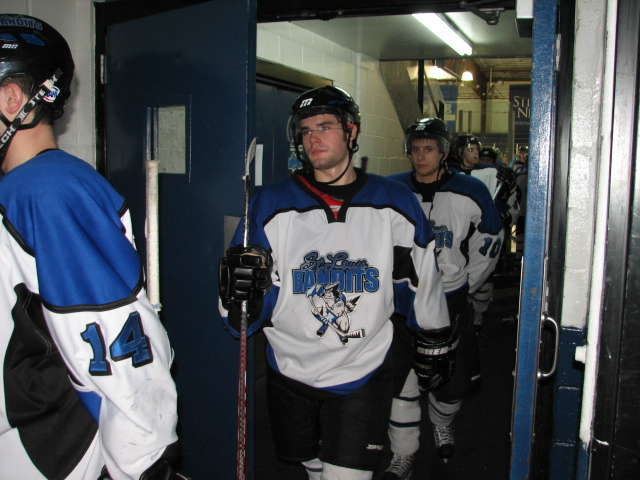
The Bandits 2010.

| Season | GP | W | L | OTL | PTS | GF | GA | PIM | Finish |
|---|---|---|---|---|---|---|---|---|---|
Texarkana Bandits
| 2003–04 | 56 | 30 | 24 | 0 | 63 | 167 | 181 | 1,727 | 4th, South Division |
| 2004–05 | 56 | 36 | 15 | 0 | 77 | 218 | 153 | 1,329 | 2nd, South Division |
| 2005–06 | 58 | 42 | 14 | 2 | 86 | 240 | 145 | 1,258 | 2nd, South Division |
St. Louis Bandits
| 2006–07 | 62 | 43 | 14 | 5 | 91 | 228 | 153 | 1,437 | 1st, South Division |
| 2007–08 | 58 | 47 | 9 | 2 | 96 | 250 | 149 | 1,429 | 1st, North Division |
| 2008–09 | 58 | 42 | 9 | 7 | 91 | 213 | 119 | 1,228 | 1st, South Division |
| 2009–10 | 58 | 44 | 11 | 3 | 91 | 211 | 125 | 1,103 | 2nd, South Division |
| 2010–11 | 58 | 41 | 13 | 4 | 86 | 215 | 120 | 764 | 1st, North Division |
| 2011–12 | 60 | 42 | 15 | 3 | 87 | 239 | 148 | 810 | 1st, Midwest Division |

=== Playoffs ===
| Season | GP | W | L | OTL | GF | GA | PIM | Finish |
|---|---|---|---|---|---|---|---|---|
Texarkana Bandits
| 2004 | Statistics Not Available | | | | | | | Lost in 1st round |
| 2005 | 9 | 4 | 5 | 0 | 25 | 27 | 226 | Lost in 2nd round |
| 2006 | 8 | 3 | 5 | 0 | 20 | 28 | 196 | Lost in 2nd round |
St. Louis Bandits
| 2007 | 12 | 9 | 3 | 0 | 53 | 34 | 180 | League champions |
| 2008 | 11 | 9 | 1 | 1 | 47 | 25 | 205 | League champions |
| 2009 | 13 | 10 | 3 | 0 | 38 | 19 | 182 | League champions |
| 2010 | 14 | 7 | 7 | 0 | 38 | 37 | 190 | 5th place/Nationals |
| 2011 | 10 | 5 | 5 | 0 | 23 | 20 | 92 | Lost in 2nd round |
| 2012 | 13 | 10 | 2 | 1 | 44 | 20 | 91 | Lost Robertson Cup Final to Texas Tornado |

== On-ice successes ==
The team had seen many successes since the Bandits began in 2003. In their first season in the league the team was the only expansion team to make the playoffs and would continue to make the playoffs every season. In May 2007 the St. Louis Bandits became NAHL champions and Tier II Junior A Hockey National Champions. The Bandits remained strong for the 2007–08 season and won back-to-back Robertson Cup Champions when they hosted it at the Hardee's IcePlex in May 2008. In 2009, the Bandits kept the winning tradition alive by capturing the Robertson Cup for a third consecutive season when St. Louis beat the Wenatchee Wild in the championship game by a score of 3–2 with an overtime goal by Clinton Bourbonais.

== NHL Draftees ==
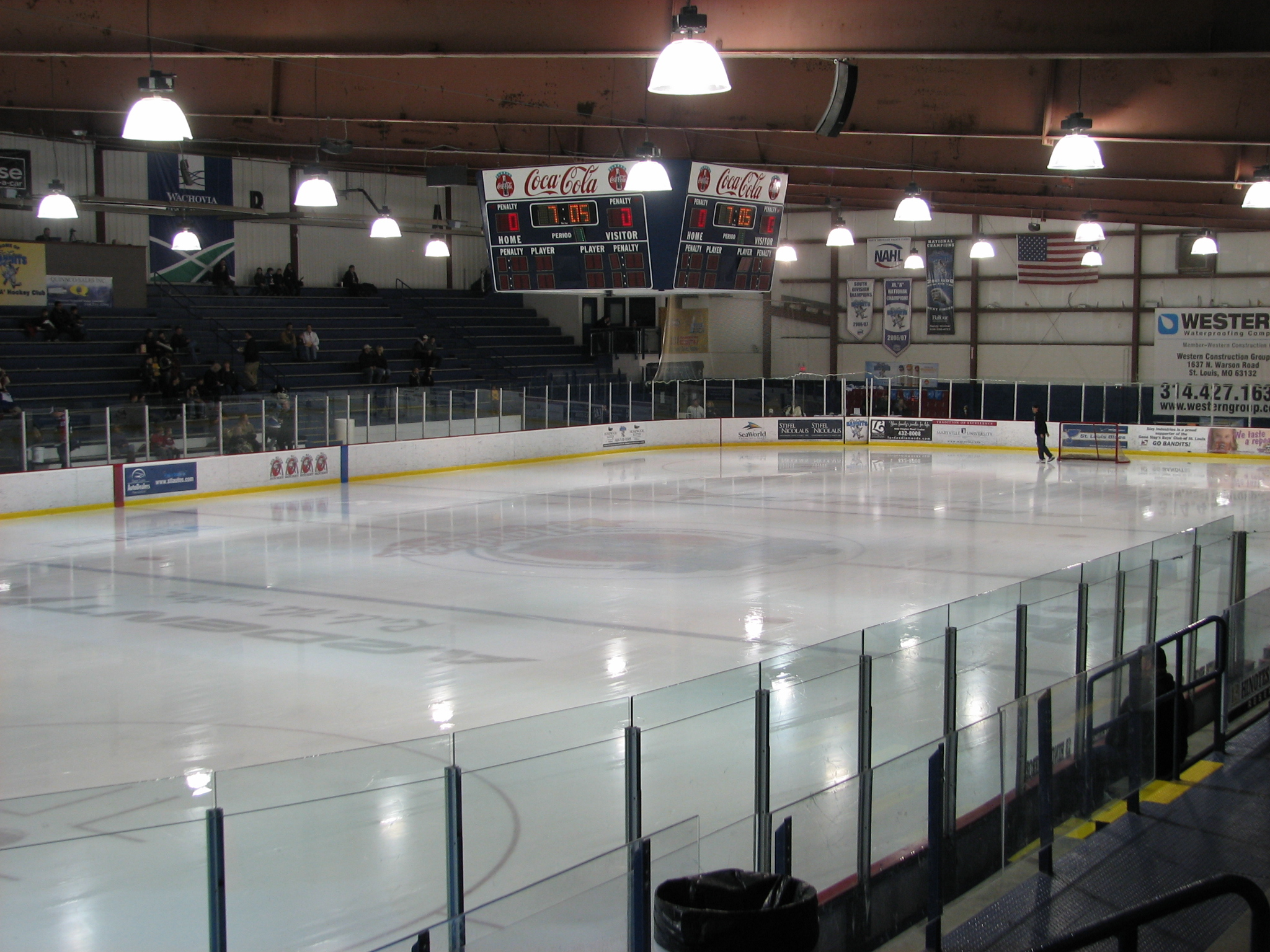
The Olympic Arena.

| Player | Seasons | Year Drafted | NHL team | Current team |
|---|---|---|---|---|
| Pat Maroon | 05–06, 06–07 | 2007 Draft | Philadelphia Flyers | Retired |
| Trent Vogelhuber | 06–07 | 2007 Draft | Columbus Blue Jackets | Retired |
| Erik Condra | 03–04 | 2006 Draft | Ottawa Senators | Retired |
| Ryan Turek | 03–04 | 2006 Draft | St. Louis Blues | Retired |
| Kyle Lawson | 03–04 | 2005 Draft | Carolina Hurricanes | Retired |
| John Ramage | 07–08 | 2010 Draft | Calgary Flames | University of Wisconsin, (WCHA) |

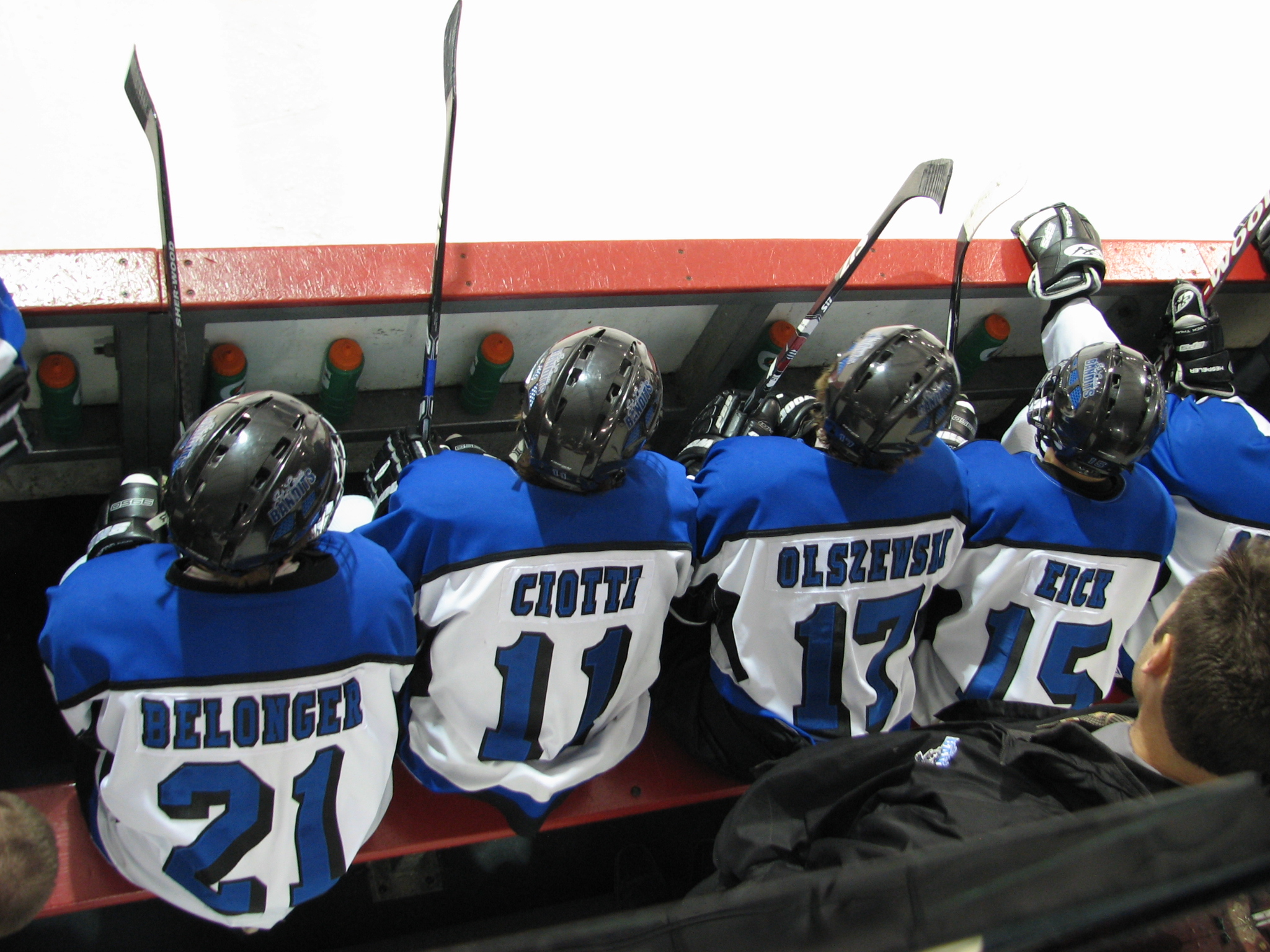
Bandits Bench.
