= Preston Hodge =

American football player (born 2002)

Profile
- Position: Cornerback

Personal information
- Born: September 18, 2002 (age 24); DeSoto, Texas, U.S.
- Listed height: 6 ft 0 in (1.83 m)
- Listed weight: 195 lb (88 kg)

Career information
- High school: Waxahachie (Waxahachie, Texas)
- College: Navarro (2021); Liberty (2022–2023); Colorado (2024–2025)
- NFL draft: 2026: undrafted

Career history
- Jacksonville Jaguars (2026)*
- * Offseason or practice squad member only
- Stats at Pro Football Reference

Preston Hodge (born September 18, 2002) is an American professional football cornerback. He played college football at Navarro College, Liberty and Colorado.

== Early life ==
Hodge attended Waxahachie High School in Waxahachie, Texas, and committed to play college football for Navarro College.

== College career ==
=== Navarro ===
During his one season at Navarro in 2021, Hodge recorded 32 tackles with three going for a loss, three pass deflections, and two interceptions in 10 games.

=== Liberty ===
Hodge transferred to play for the Liberty Flames. In 2022, he posted 12 tackles. In 2023, Hodge made ten starts, totaling 48 tackles with three being for a loss, eight pass deflections, and two interceptions. After the conclusion of the season he entered the NCAA transfer portal.

=== Colorado ===
Hodge transferred to play for the Colorado Buffaloes. In 2024, he recorded 33 tackles, seven pass deflections, and two interceptions in nine starts. Hodge returned to the Buffaloes for the 2025 season after the NCAA granted a waiver to former junior college players for an extra year of eligibility for the 2025 season. In week 9 of the 2025 season, he posted five pass deflections in a loss to Utah. Hodge finished the 2025 season with 41 tackles, 13 pass deflections, and an interception.

== Professional career ==
Pre-draft measurables
Height	Weight	Arm length	Hand span	Wingspan	40-yard dash	10-yard split	20-yard split	20-yard shuttle	Vertical jump	Broad jump	Bench press
5 ft 10 5/8 in (1.79 m)	197 lb (89 kg)	30 5/8 in (0.78 m)	8 3/4 in (0.22 m)	6 ft 3 in (1.91 m)	4.59 s	1.62 s	2.64 s	4.27 s	32.0 in (0.81 m)	10 ft 0 in (3.05 m)	14 reps
All values from Pro Day

On April 26, 2026, Hodge signed with the Jacksonville Jaguars as an undrafted free agent. On August 30, he was waived by Jacksonville as a part of final roster cuts.
