= Onalaska OmniCenter =

Multi-function event and sports venue in Wisconsin, US

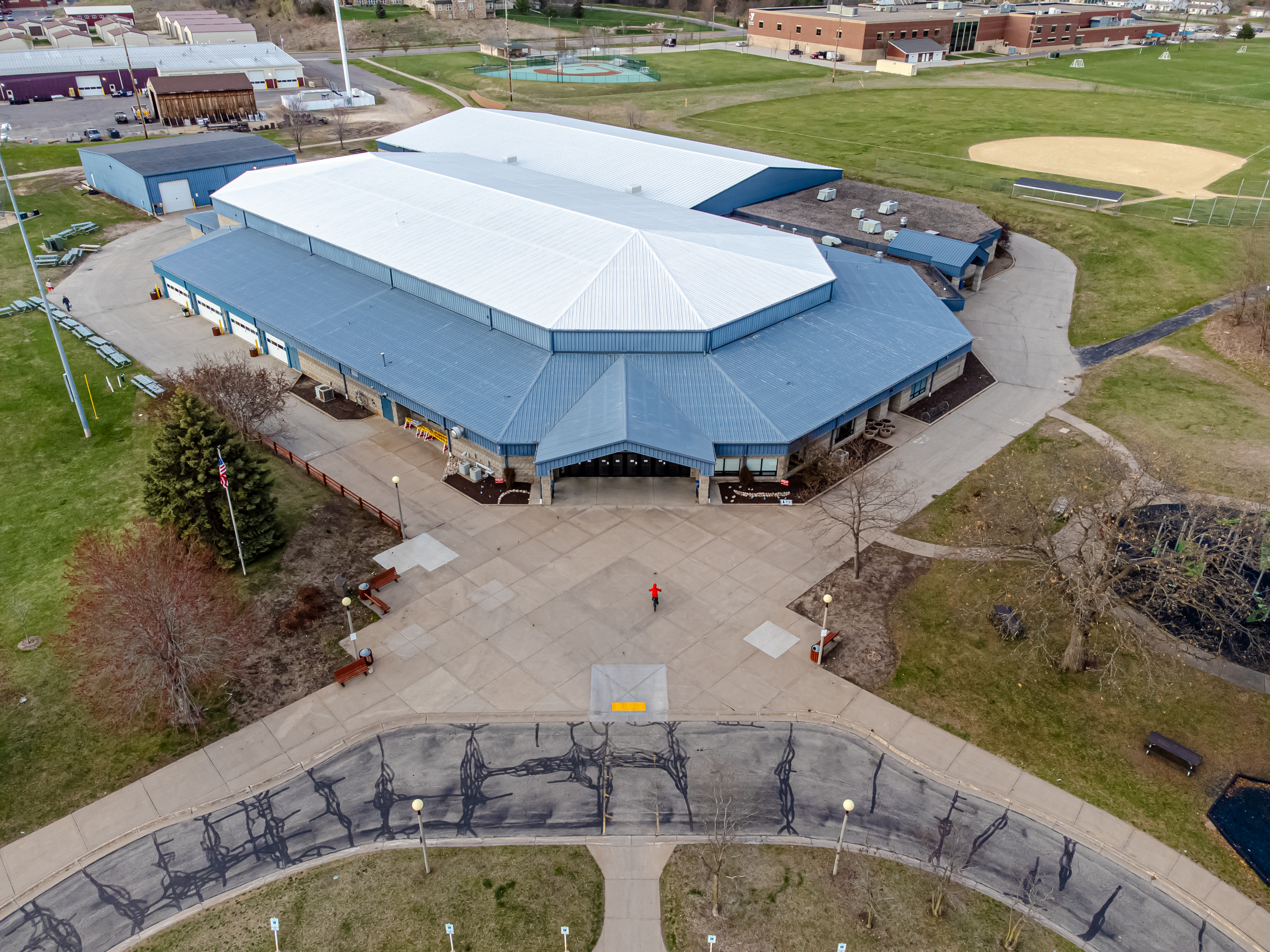
- Interactive map of Onalaska OmniCenter
- Address: 255 Riders Club Road; Onalaska, Wisconsin
- Coordinates: 43.9077205°N 91.2407392°W
- Owner: City of Onalaska
- Type: Convention center, sports venue

Construction
- Built: c. 1993

Tenants
- Coulee Region Chill (NAHL) 2010–2014; Onalaska Hilltoppers (WiHP)

Website
- Official website

Onalaska Omni Center is a municipal convention center and indoor sports arena in Onalaska, Wisconsin, which serves greater La Crosse County.

It was the home of the Coulee Region Chill of the North American Hockey League (NAHL) from the fall of 2010 until August 2014.

== Gallery ==
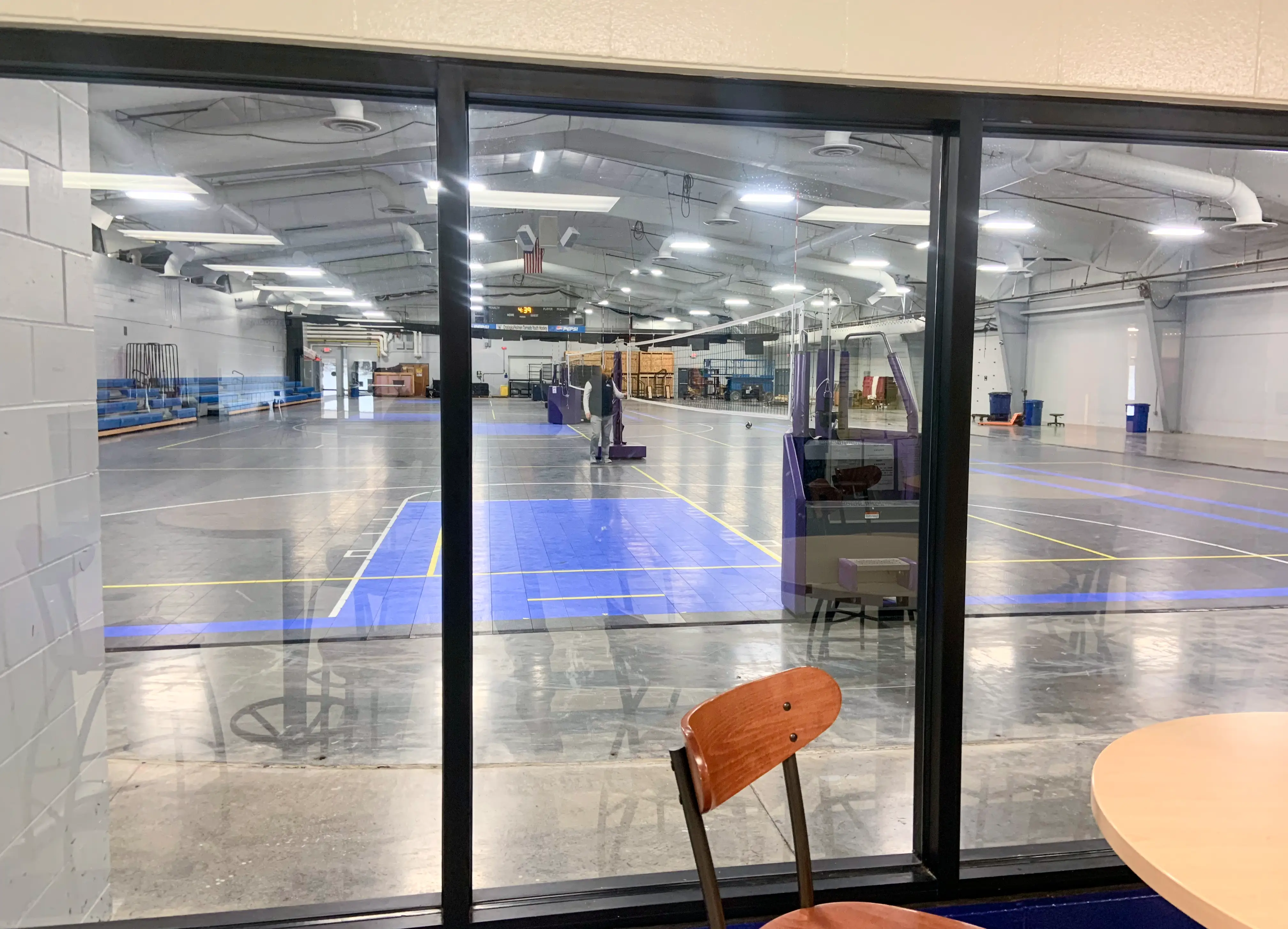
Arena space set up for volleyball

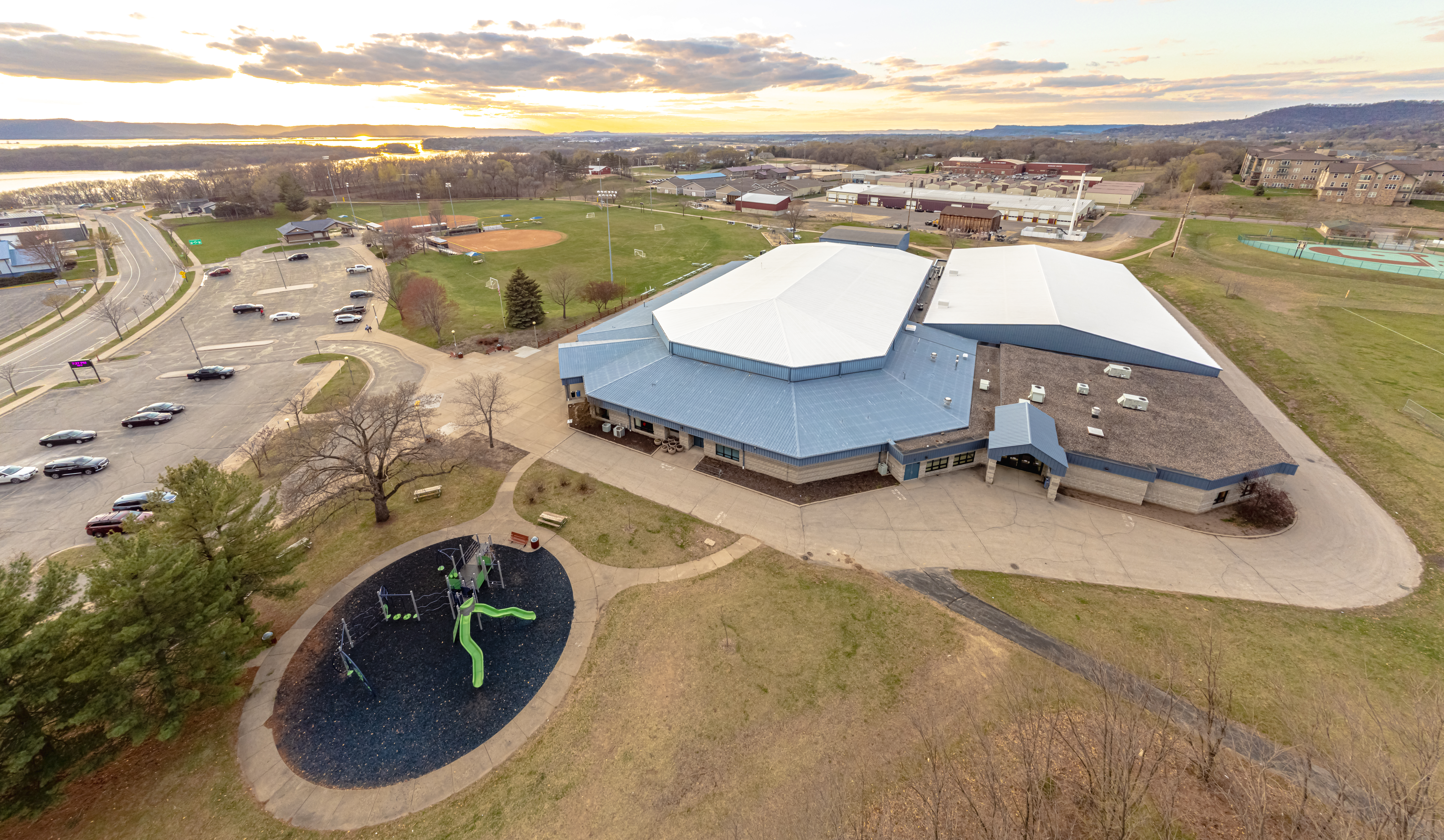

== See also ==
- La Crosse Center
