= Janesville Ice Arena =

Ice arena in Janesville, Wisconsin

Coordinates: 42.671227°N 89.010512°W

- "The Hangar"
- Interactive map of Janesville Ice Arena
- Location: 821 Beloit Avenue; Janesville, Wisconsin
- Owner: The City of Janesville
- Operator: The City of Janesville Department of Leisure Services
- Capacity: 1,000
- Surface: Ice

Construction
- Groundbreaking: January 9, 1974
- Opened: December 16, 1974
- Cost: $798,000 ($5.21 million in 2025 dollars)

Tenant
- Janesville Jets (NAHL) (2009–2025)

Janesville Ice Arena is an ice arena and skating center owned by the city of Janesville, Wisconsin. It was home to the Janesville Jets, a North American Hockey League team. The arena still hosts high school and youth hockey programs.

== History ==
In preparation for the Janesville Jets, the rink underwent a renovation that included new locker rooms and improved public areas such as the ticket booths and concession stand.

In 2012, the Janesville Ice Arena completed a major upgrade, which included new under floor piping, a concrete floor, a domestic hot water boiler, high efficiency lighting, updated locker rooms and a building addition that included a snow melt pit, a zamboni garage, and a geothermal heat pump.
