= Runestone Community Center =

Multi purpose ice arena and recreational facility in Alexandria, Minnesota

Coordinates: 45°53′32″N 95°23′33″W

- Interactive map of Runestone Community Center
- Location: Alexandria, Minnesota, United States
- Owner: city of Alexandria, Minnesota
- Surface: 200' x 85'(hockey)

Tenant
- Alexandria Blizzard (NA3HL)

The Runestone Community Center is a multi purpose ice arena and recreational facility located in Alexandria, Minnesota. The ice arena serves as the home to the Alexandria Blizzard of the North American 3 Hockey League. The facility is also home to several local high school ice hockey teams, local figure skating clubs, youth, and adult recreational ice hockey leagues, as well as public skating.
