= Hardee's Iceplex =

Arena in Chesterfield, Missouri, US

Hardee's IcePlex
- Interactive map of Hardee's IcePlex
- Former names: U.S. Ice Sports Complex (1995–2002); Summit Center (2002–2008); Hardee's IcePlex (2008–2017)
- Address: 16851 North Outer 40 Road; Chesterfield, Missouri 63005-1430
- Coordinates: 38°40′14″N 90°35′1.5″W
- Owner: Summit Development
- Capacity: 2,200
- Surface: 2 rinks: 200' x 85'; 1 rink: 200' x 100'

Construction
- Opened: 1995
- Demolished: 2017

Website
- Official website at the Wayback Machine (archived 2017-02-23)

Hardee's IcePlex was a 2,200-seat multi-purpose arena in Chesterfield, Missouri. At one time, the 115,000 square feet (10,700 m^{2}) building was the largest ice skating facility in Missouri. The facility had two regulation NHL-size rinks (85’ x 200’) with 600-seat capacities each. The facility's main rink was a regulation Olympic-size rink (100’ x 200’) with a seating capacity of 2,200. The building also had a Total Hockey franchise, as well as a restaurant.

Hardee's IcePlex closed in May 2017, as the owner of the facility sold the property to Dallas-based Topgolf.

== History ==
The facility opened in 1995 as the U.S. Ice Sports Complex. In 2002, it was bought by Summit Development and changed its name to Summit Center. On February 19, 2008, the name was changed to Hardee's IcePlex, reflecting the 7-year naming rights deal with Hardee's, a St. Louis-based fast food corporation. In 2017, the property was bought by Topgolf and completely demolished.

== Tenants ==
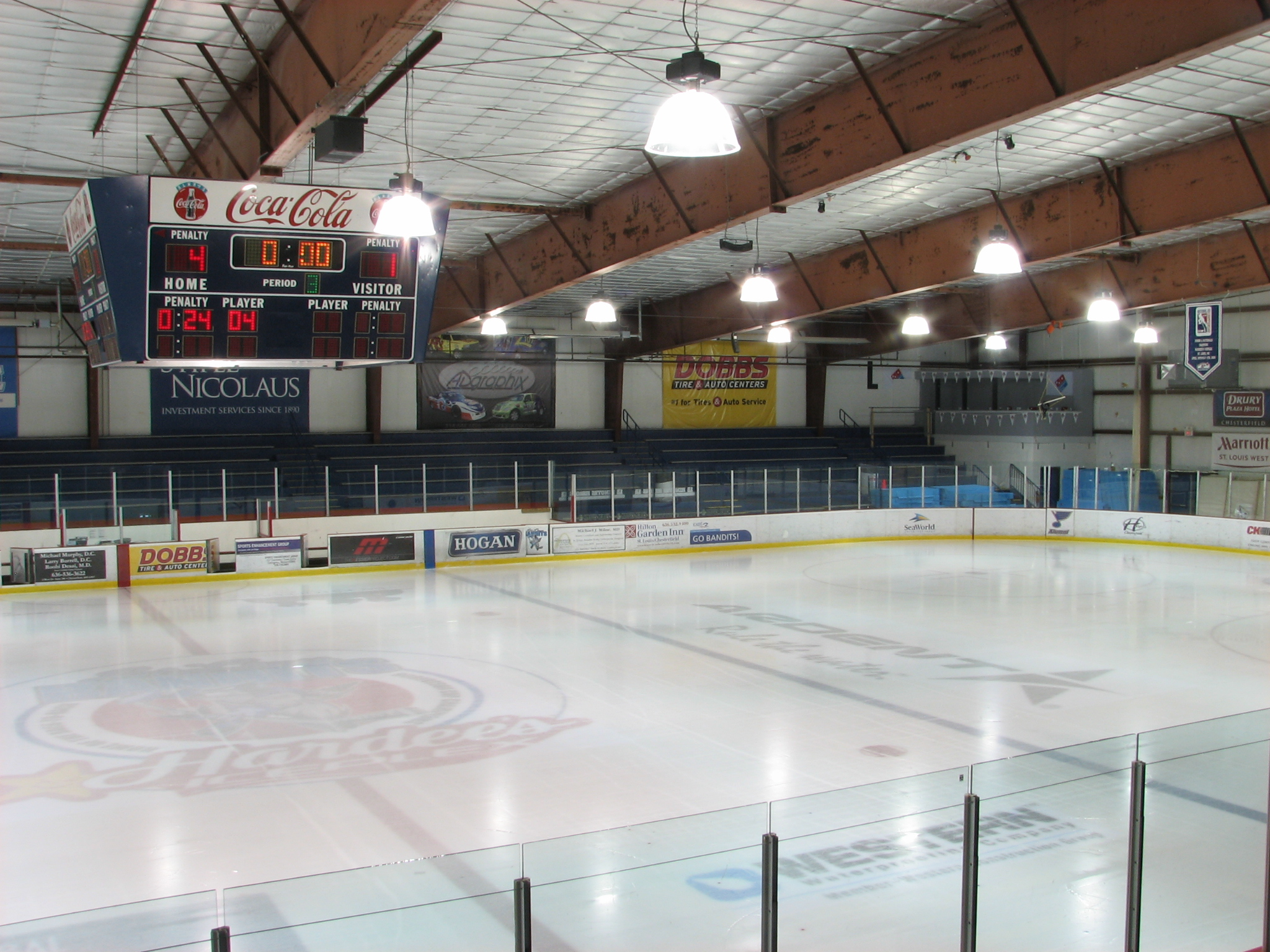
Olympic Arena

The facility was the home for local high school teams, an in house program, and the St. Louis AAA Blues. It was also used for public skating, figure skating, and junior hockey teams.

=== Former tenants ===
- Chesterfield Hockey Association (Chesterfield Falcons): Missouri Hockey youth hockey club, moved to Maryville University Hockey Center
- St. Louis Amateur Blues Association (St. Louis AAA Blues): T1EHL youth hockey club, moved to Centene Community Ice Center
- St. Louis Bandits: defunct NAHL franchise
- Saint Louis Billikens men's ice hockey: moved to Webster Ice Arena
- St. Louis Blues (practice only): moved to the IceZone at St. Louis Outlet Mall
- St. Louis Heartland Eagles: defunct USHL franchise
