= 2015–16 NAHL season =

- League: North American Hockey League
- Sport: Ice hockey
- Duration: Regular season September 11, 2015 – April 10, 2016; Postseason; April 14 – May 15, 2016
- Games: 60
- Teams: 22

Draft
- Top draft pick: Braden Brown
- Picked by: Wilkes-Barre/Scranton Knights

Regular season
- Season champions: Fairbanks Ice Dogs
- Season MVP: Todd Burgess (Fairbanks Ice Dogs)
- Top scorer: Todd Burgess (Fairbanks Ice Dogs)

Robertson Cup Playoffs
- Robertson Cup Playoffs MVP: Reggie Lutz (Ice Dogs)
- Finals champions: Fairbanks Ice Dogs
- Runners-up: Wichita Falls Wildcats

NAHL seasons
- ← 2014–15 2016–17 →

The 2015–16 NAHL season was the 32nd season of the North American Hockey League. The regular season ran from September 2015 to April 2016 with a 60-game schedule for each team. The Fairbanks Ice Dogs won the regular season championship and went on to defeat the Wichita Falls Wildcats 2–0 in the championship game to capture the Robertson Cup.

== Member changes ==
- After the NAHL assumed control of the Keystone Ice Miners in the middle of the previous season, the franchise was suspended at the conclusion of the year.
- In early March, the Michigan Warriors announced that they would be relocating after their lease with the Perani Arena and Event Center would not be renewed for this season. After failing to find a new home venue, the team suspended operations.
- In May, The NAHL approved the addition of the Wilkes-Barre/Scranton Knights to the league. At the time, the team was an active member of the Eastern Hockey League, however, as part of the agreement, they purchased the franchise rights to the dormant Dawson Creek Rage. Rather than operate teams in both leagues, the Knights moved their Tier III club to the North American 3 Hockey League. Despite the move, the Tier III club suspended play for two years before reappearing in the EHL in 2017.
- After the 2014–15 season, the Soo Eagles announced that they would be leaving the NAHL due to the loss of all other regional teams over the past few years (including the Michigan Warriors). The Eagles sold their franchise rights to the New Jersey Junior Titans youth organization which was moved to Middletown, New Jersey.
- Lewiston, Maine had been approved for an expansion team for this season, however, the prospective owner withdrew his bid due to a lack of preparation time with the intention of reapplying later.
- In early June, the Wenatchee Wild announced that they would be leaving the NAHL for the British Columbia Hockey League. The club cited a reduction in travel expenses as their primary concern.
- On the same day, news broke that the Rio Grande Valley Killer Bees would soon be moving to Aston, Pennsylvania. In response, the Bees' home city announced that unless the team's president could not keep the club in Hidalgo, Texas, the franchise would cease operations for the next season. Ultimately, however, the NAHL approved the relocation and the franchise became the Aston Rebels.

== Regular season ==
The standings at the end of the regular season were as follows:

Note: x = clinched playoff berth; y = clinched division title; z = clinched regular season title

=== Standings ===
==== Central Division ====
| Team | GP | W | L | OTL | Pts | GF | GA |
|---|---|---|---|---|---|---|---|
| xy – Bismarck Bobcats | 60 | 37 | 19 | 4 | 78 | 185 | 153 |
| x – Minot Minotauros | 60 | 35 | 19 | 6 | 76 | 185 | 158 |
| x – Austin Bruins | 60 | 29 | 27 | 4 | 62 | 181 | 168 |
| x – Brookings Blizzard | 60 | 25 | 29 | 6 | 56 | 149 | 200 |
| Minnesota Magicians | 60 | 24 | 28 | 8 | 56 | 164 | 198 |
| Aberdeen Wings | 60 | 22 | 27 | 11 | 55 | 131 | 171 |

==== East Division ====
| Team | GP | W | L | OTL | Pts | GF | GA |
|---|---|---|---|---|---|---|---|
| xy – Aston Rebels | 60 | 35 | 21 | 4 | 74 | 196 | 146 |
| x – New Jersey Titans | 60 | 34 | 22 | 4 | 72 | 187 | 156 |
| x – Johnstown Tomahawks | 60 | 31 | 24 | 5 | 67 | 197 | 200 |
| x – Wilkes-Barre/Scranton Knights | 60 | 22 | 28 | 10 | 54 | 159 | 232 |

==== Midwest Division ====
| Team | GP | W | L | OTL | Pts | GF | GA |
|---|---|---|---|---|---|---|---|
| xyz – Fairbanks Ice Dogs | 60 | 49 | 8 | 3 | 101 | 251 | 116 |
| x – Janesville Jets | 60 | 35 | 18 | 7 | 77 | 181 | 150 |
| x – Minnesota Wilderness | 60 | 34 | 18 | 8 | 76 | 183 | 161 |
| x – Coulee Region Chill | 60 | 33 | 26 | 1 | 67 | 177 | 165 |
| Springfield Jr. Blues | 60 | 29 | 25 | 6 | 64 | 155 | 164 |
| Kenai River Brown Bears | 60 | 4 | 51 | 5 | 13 | 109 | 292 |

==== South Division ====
| Team | GP | W | L | OTL | Pts | GF | GA |
|---|---|---|---|---|---|---|---|
| xy – Wichita Falls Wildcats | 60 | 44 | 11 | 5 | 93 | 224 | 141 |
| x – Lone Star Brahmas | 60 | 39 | 12 | 9 | 87 | 186 | 136 |
| x – Topeka RoadRunners | 60 | 34 | 24 | 2 | 70 | 190 | 154 |
| x – Odessa Jackalopes | 60 | 27 | 29 | 4 | 58 | 185 | 218 |
| Corpus Christi IceRays | 60 | 25 | 29 | 6 | 56 | 139 | 170 |
| Amarillo Bulls | 60 | 13 | 43 | 4 | 30 | 133 | 218 |

=== Statistics ===
==== Scoring leaders ====
The following players led the league in regular season points at the completion of all regular season games.

| Player | Team | GP | G | A | Pts | PIM |
|---|---|---|---|---|---|---|
| Todd Burgess | Fairbanks Ice Dogs | 60 | 38 | 57 | 95 | 52 |
| Ryner Gorowsky | Fairbanks Ice Dogs | 59 | 28 | 55 | 83 | 84 |
| Hampus Sjodahl | Odessa Jackalopes | 60 | 35 | 34 | 69 | 34 |
| Logan Coomes | Fairbanks Ice Dogs | 56 | 25 | 40 | 65 | 71 |
| Derek Brown | Odessa Jackalopes | 60 | 14 | 50 | 64 | 28 |
| Tyler Tomberlin | Fairbanks Ice Dogs | 59 | 17 | 46 | 63 | 20 |
| Austin Albrecht | Wichita Falls Wildcats | 58 | 26 | 34 | 60 | 94 |
| Gilbert Gabor | Austin Bruins | 55 | 21 | 37 | 58 | 149 |
| Andrew Romano | Johnstown Tomahawks | 60 | 17 | 39 | 56 | 14 |
| Luke Lynch | Johnstown Tomahawks | 57 | 29 | 27 | 56 | 116 |

==== Leading goaltenders ====
Note: GP = Games played; Mins = Minutes played; W = Wins; L = Losses; OTL = Overtime losses; SOL = Shootout losses; SO = Shutouts; GAA = Goals against average; SV% = Save percentage

| Player | Team | GP | Mins | W | L | OTL | SOL | GA | SV | SV% | GAA |
|---|---|---|---|---|---|---|---|---|---|---|---|
| Gavin Nieto | Fairbanks Ice Dogs | 39 | 2350:36 | 33 | 5 | 1 | 0 | 67 | 864 | .923 | 1.71 |
| Hunter Shepard | Bismarck Bobcats | 50 | 2932:11 | 34 | 11 | 1 | 2 | 93 | 1,239 | .925 | 1.90 |
| Corbin Kaczperski | Lone Star Brahmas | 39 | 2210:02 | 25 | 6 | 2 | 2 | 73 | 728 | .900 | 1.98 |
| Justin Kapelmaster | Wichita Falls Wildcats | 46 | 2618:30 | 33 | 8 | 2 | 1 | 90 | 1,106 | .919 | 2.06 |
| C. J. Boothe | Fairbanks Ice Dogs | 18 | 1084:47 | 13 | 3 | 2 | 0 | 39 | 432 | .910 | 2.16 |

== Robertson Cup playoffs ==
Teams are reseeded prior to the semifinal round based upon regular season records.

Division Semifinals (Best-of-5)
C1 | Bismarck Bobcats | 5 | 5 | 1 | 3 | -
C4 | Brookings Blizzard | 2 | 3 | 2 | 1 | -
Central Division
C2 | Minot Minotauros | 3 | 1 | 3 | 2 | -
C3 | Austin Bruins | 1 | 4 | 6 | 3 | -
E1 | Aston Rebels | 3 | 3 | 6 | - | -
E4 | Wilkes-Barre/Scranton Knights | 2 | 2 | 1 | - | -
East Division
E2 | New Jersey Titans | 3 | 0 | 1 | - | -
E3 | Johnstown Tomahawks | 5 | 2 | 2* | - | -
MW1 | Fairbanks Ice Dogs | 1 | 6 | 3 | 4 | -
MW4 | Coulee Region Chill | 6 | 1 | 0 | 1 | -
Midwest Division
MW2 | Janesville Jets | 5 | 1 | 1 | 2 | -
MW3 | Minnesota Wilderness | 2 | 2 | 2** | 3* | -
S1 | Wichita Falls Wildcats | 6 | 5 | 6 | - | -
S4 | Odessa Jackalopes | 3 | 0 | 3 | - | -
South Division
S2 | Lone Star Brahmas | 3 | 1 | 2 | 4 | -
S3 | Topeka RoadRunners | 1 | 2* | 5 | 5* | -

Division Finals (Best-of-5)
C1 | Bismarck Bobcats | 5 | 4 | 0 | 2 | 4
C3 | Austin Bruins | 1 | 1 | 7 | 3 | 0
E1 | Aston Rebels | 5 | 4* | 9 | - | -
E3 | Johnstown Tomahawks | 2 | 3 | 2 | - | -
MW1 | Fairbanks Ice Dogs | 2* | 3* | 1 | 2 | 5
MW3 | Minnesota Wilderness | 1 | 2 | 2** | 3 | 2
S1 | Wichita Falls Wildcats | 3 | 5 | 2** | - | -
S3 | Topeka RoadRunners | 1 | 4 | 1 | - | -

Semifinal (Best-of-3)
1 | Fairbanks Ice Dogs | 2 | 3 | -
4 | Aston Rebels | 1 | 0 | -
2 | Wichita Falls Wildcats | 3 | 5 | -
3 | Bismarck Bobcats | 2 | 2 | -

Championship (Best-of-1)
1 | Fairbanks Ice Dogs | 2
2 | Wichita Falls Wildcats | 0

Note: * denotes overtime period(s)

== Division Semifinals ==
=== Central Division ===
==== (C1) Bismarck Bobcats vs. (C4) Brookings Blizzard ====
| April 15 | Bismarck Bobcats | 5 – 2 | Brookings Blizzard | V.F.W. Sports Center |
| 5:39 - pp - Alex Strand (1); 17:37 - pp - Aaron Herdt (1); 19:59 - pp - Patrik Demel (1) | | First period | Martan Yelle (1) - 8:15 |
| No scoring | | Second period | Mikael Hakkarainen (1) - pp - 1:13 |
| 5:08 - Solag Bakich (1); 18:07 - en - Willie Brown (1) | | Third period | No scoring |
| Hunter Shepard (28 saves / 30 shots) | | Goalie stats | Josh Kuehmichel (25 saves / 29 shots) |

| April 16 | Bismarck Bobcats | 5 – 3 | Brookings Blizzard | V.F.W. Sports Center |
| 15:18 - Aaron Herdt (2) | | First period | Nick Ford (1) - pp - 10:38 |
| 10:00 - pp - Willie Brown (2); 13:40 - pp - Aaron Herdt (3) | | Second period | Mikael Hakkarainen (2) - pp - 18:40 |
| 0:17 - Oskars Batņa (1); 19:26 - en - Harrison Aide (1) | | Third period | Nick Ford (2) - 11:56 |
| Hunter Shepard (28 saves / 31 shots) | | Goalie stats | Josh Kuehmichel (33 saves / 37 shots) |

| April 22 | Brookings Blizzard | 2 – 1 | Bismarck Bobcats | Larson Ice Center |
| No scoring | | First period | No scoring |
| 0:36 - Griff Jeszka (1) | | Second period | Oskars Batņa (2) - pp - 4:17 |
| 9:30 - Griff Jeszka (2) | | Third period | No scoring |
| Josh Kuehmichel (22 saves / 23 shots) | | Goalie stats | Hunter Shepard (27 saves / 29 shots) |

| April 23 | Brookings Blizzard | 1 – 3 | Bismarck Bobcats | Larson Ice Center |
| 14:18 - Griff Jeszka (3) | | First period | No scoring |
| No scoring | | Second period | Patrik Demel (2) - 9:26; Harrison Aide (2) - 14:57 |
| No scoring | | Third period | Harrison Aide (3) - 1:25 |
| Josh Kuehmichel (24 saves / 27 shots) | | Goalie stats | Hunter Shepard (28 saves / 29 shots) |

| Bismarck wins series 3 – 1 |

==== (C2) Minot Minotauros vs. (C3) Austin Bruins ====
| April 15 | Minot Minotauros | 3 – 1 | Austin Bruins | Maysa Arena |
| 14:53 - Jack Murphy (1) | | First period | Paul O'Connor (1) - 17:41 |
| No scoring | | Second period | No scoring |
| 14:18 - pp - Christian Mohs (1); 16:34 - pp - Jack Murphy (2) | | Third period | No scoring |
| Gunner Rivers (22 saves / 23 shots) | | Goalie stats | Kristofer Carlson (30 saves / 33 shots) |

| April 16 | Minot Minotauros | 1 – 4 | Austin Bruins | Maysa Arena |
| No scoring | | First period | Jade Miller (1) - pp - 1:27 |
| No scoring | | Second period | Austin Rueschhoff (1) - pp - 4:39; Jacob Paganelli (1) - pp - 14:06 |
| 17:00 - Grayson Gavin (1) | | Third period | Evan Cholak (1) - en - 19:51 |
| Gunner Rivers (24 saves / 27 shots) | | Goalie stats | Kristofer Carlson (29 saves / 30 shots) |

| April 22 | Austin Bruins | 6 – 3 | Minot Minotauros | Riverside Arena |
| 15:12 - Gilbert Gabor (1) | | First period | Nate Pionk (1) - 10:15 |
| 6:26 - Austin Rueschhoff (2); 8:46 - Gilbert Gabor (2) | | Second period | Chase Springman (1) - 2:46 |
| 6:44 - pp - Jade Miller (2); 18:47 - en - Luke Forfar (1); 19:16 - en - Evan Cholak (2) | | Third period | James LaDouce (1) - pp - 17:02 |
| Kristofer Carlson (29 saves / 32 shots) | | Goalie stats | Gunner Rivers (10 saves / 14 shots) |

| April 23 | Austin Bruins | 3 – 2 | Minot Minotauros | Riverside Arena |
| 10:09 - Jacob Paganelli (3) | | First period | Jared Brandt (1) - pp - 13:10 |
| 0:39 - Jade Miller (3); 5:19 - Paul O’Connor (2) | | Second period | No scoring |
| No scoring | | Third period | Christian Mohs (2) - 19:15 |
| Kristofer Carlson (31 saves / 33 shots) | | Goalie stats | Gunner Rivers (21 saves / 24 shots) |

| Austin wins series 3 – 1 |

=== East Division ===
==== (E1) Aston Rebels vs. (E4) Wilkes-Barre/Scranton Knights ====
| April 15 | Aston Rebels | 3 – 2 | Wilkes-Barre/Scranton Knights | IceWorks Skating Complex |
| 5:09 - Ryan Cusin (1); 17:16 - Michael Merulla (1) | | First period | Tim Gelatt (1) - 14:10 |
| 5:44 - Michael Merulla (2) | | Second period | No scoring |
| No scoring | | Third period | Carson Knop (1) - 6:15 |
| Darion Hanson (22 saves / 24 shots) | | Goalie stats | Grant Valentine (27 saves / 30 shots) |

| April 16 | Aston Rebels | 3 – 2 | Wilkes-Barre/Scranton Knights | IceWorks Skating Complex |
| No scoring | | First period | Blake Busch (1) - 3:20; Dorian Dawson (1) - 18:47 |
| No scoring | | Second period | No scoring |
| 4:23 - Kristofers Bindulis (1); 4:35 - Eric Carreras (1); 6:42 - Michael Merulla (3) | | Third period | No scoring |
| Darion Hanson (19 saves / 21 shots) | | Goalie stats | Andrey Svistunov (30 saves / 33 shots) |

| April 22 | Wilkes-Barre/Scranton Knights | 1 – 6 | Aston Rebels | Rev Ice Center |
| No scoring | | First period | No scoring |
| 18:44 - Braden Brown (1) | | Second period | Andrew Bellant (1) - 6:03; Frank Spellman (1) - 11:23; Austin Swingle (1) - 17:24; Andrew Bellant (2) - 19:19 |
| No scoring | | Third period | Dean Balsamo (1) - en - 15:10; Ryan Solomon (1) - en - 17:09 |
| Grant Valentine (31 saves / 36 shots) | | Goalie stats | Darion Hanson (33 saves / 34 shots) |

| Aston wins series 3 – 0 |

==== (E2) New Jersey Titans vs. (E3) Johnstown Tomahawks ====
| April 14 | New Jersey Titans | 3 – 5 | Johnstown Tomahawks | Middletown Ice World |
| 12:46 - Adam Hascic (1) | | First period | Niko Coffman (1) - 6:46 |
| No scoring | | Second period | Casey Linkenheld (1) - pp - 5:03; Andrew Romano (1) - pp - 11:43; Casey Linkenheld (2) - 18:08 |
| 3:14 - Raymond Brice (1); 9:04 - pp - Andrew Durham (1) | | Third period | Casey Linkenheld (3) - 12:16 |
| Jack Berry (18 saves / 23 shots) | | Goalie stats | Andrew Lindgren (19 saves / 22 shots) |

| April 15 | New Jersey Titans | 0 – 2 | Johnstown Tomahawks | Middletown Ice World |
| No scoring | | First period | No scoring |
| No scoring | | Second period | No scoring |
| No scoring | | Third period | Zak Galambos (1) - 0:25; Luke Lynch (1) - en - 18:54 |
| Jack Berry (24 saves / 25 shots) | | Goalie stats | Andrew Lindgren (21 saves / 21 shots) |

| April 22 | Johnstown Tomahawks | 2 – 1 | OT | New Jersey Titans | Cambria County War Memorial Arena |
| No scoring | | First period | | No scoring |
| No scoring | | Second period | | Raymond Brice (2) - 18:58 |
| 19:41 - Anthony Parrucci (1) | | Third period | | No scoring |
| 3:58 - Logan Hudson (1) | | First overtime period | | No scoring |
| Andrew Lindgren (22 saves / 23 shots) | | Goalie stats | | Jack Berry (32 saves / 34 shots) |

| Johnstown wins series 3 – 0 |

=== Midwest Division ===
==== (MW1) Fairbanks Ice Dogs vs. (MW4) Coulee Region Chill ====
| April 15 | Fairbanks Ice Dogs | 1 – 6 | Coulee Region Chill | Big Dipper Ice Arena |
| 7:55 - Jakob Stridsberg (1) | | First period | Larry Jungwirth (1) - 8:49; Shane Kuzmeski (1) - pp - 11:12 |
| No scoring | | Second period | Nicolas Luka (1) - 5:56; Alex Falconer (1) - 17:53 |
| No scoring | | Third period | Larry Jungwirth (2) - 4:41; Dominik Florián (1) - sh - 6:02 |
| Gavin Nieto (11 saves / 15 shots); Carleton Boothe (8 saves / 10 shots) | | Goalie stats | Matīss Kivlenieks (24 saves / 25 shots) |

| April 16 | Fairbanks Ice Dogs | 6 – 1 | Coulee Region Chill | Big Dipper Ice Arena |
| No scoring | | First period | No scoring |
| 2:28 - pp - Todd Burgess (1); 4:44 - Cayden Cahill (1); 10:39 - Ryner Gorowsky (1); 14:01 - pp - Ryner Gorowsky (2); 15:07 - pp - Ryner Gorowsky (3) | | Second period | Nico Luka (1) - pp - 9:57 |
| 16:14 - Jakob Stridsberg (2) | | Third period | No scoring |
| Gavin Nieto (27 saves / 28 shots) | | Goalie stats | Matīss Kivlenieks (15 saves / 19 shots); Hunter Vorva (13 saves / 15 shots) |

| April 17 | Fairbanks Ice Dogs | 3 – 0 | Coulee Region Chill | Big Dipper Ice Arena |
| Logan Coomes (1) - pp - 8:06; Reggie Lutz (1) - 15:03 | | First period | No scoring |
| No scoring | | Second period | No scoring |
| Reggie Lutz (2) - 10:28 | | Third period | No scoring |
| Gavin Nieto (22 saves / 22 shots) | | Goalie stats | Matīss Kivlenieks (34 saves / 37 shots) |

| April 22 | Coulee Region Chill | 1 – 4 | Fairbanks Ice Dogs | Green Island Ice Arena |
| 8:39 - Larry Jungwirth (3) | | First period | Josef Ingman (1) - 0:44 |
| No scoring | | Second period | Ryner Gorowsky (4) - 4:07 |
| No scoring | | Third period | Jakob Stridsberg (3) - 7:21; Clay Cross (1) - 13:22 |
| Matīss Kivlenieks (27 saves / 31 shots) | | Goalie stats | Gavin Nieto (19 saves / 20 shots) |

| Fairbanks wins series 3 – 1 |

==== (MW2) Janesville Jets vs. (MW3) Minnesota Wilderness ====
| April 15 | Janesville Jets | 5 – 2 | Minnesota Wilderness | Janesville Ice Arena |
| 3:46 - Andrew Roye (1); 6:55 - Adrián Holešinský (1) | | First period | No scoring |
| 8:28 - Andrew Roye (2); 16:30 - Michael Maloney (1) | | Second period | No scoring |
| 13:29 - pp - Taylor Fernandez (1) | | Third period | Tristan Rostagno (1) - 1:39; Casey Gilling (1) - 16:11 |
| Jack LaFontaine (27 saves / 29 shots) | | Goalie stats | Chase Munroe (17 saves / 21 shots); Luke Kania (5 saves / 6 shots) |

| April 16 | Janesville Jets | 1 – 2 | Minnesota Wilderness | Janesville Ice Arena |
| No scoring | | First period | Jānis Jaks (1) - 11:24 |
| 10:12 - sh - Dawson DiPietro (1) | | Second period | Casey Gilling (2) - sh - 14:54 |
| No scoring | | Third period | No scoring |
| Jack LaFontaine (17 saves / 19 shots) | | Goalie stats | Luke Kania (17 saves / 18 shots) |

| April 22 | Minnesota Wilderness | 2 – 1 | 2OT | Janesville Jets | Northwoods Credit Union Arena |
| No scoring | | First period | | Adam Winborg (1) - 5:38 |
| 7:47 - pp - Alex Toscano (1) | | Second period | | No scoring |
| No scoring | | Third period | | No scoring |
| 13:28 - Isak Bergland (1) | | Second overtime period | | No scoring |
| Luke Kania (23 saves / 24 shots) | | Goalie stats | | Jack LaFontaine (41 saves / 43 shots) |

| April 23 | Minnesota Wilderness | 3 – 2 | OT | Janesville Jets | Northwoods Credit Union Arena |
| 16:59 - pp - Ryan Bloom (1) | | First period | | Adrián Holešinský (2) - 0:53 |
| 12:59 - Aaron Miller (1) | | Second period | | Peter Bates (1) - 12:02 |
| No scoring | | Third period | | No scoring |
| 13:45 - Ryan Bloom (2) | | First overtime period | | No scoring |
| Luke Kania (23 saves / 25 shots) | | Goalie stats | | Jack LaFontaine (28 saves / 31 shots) |

| Minnesota wins series 3 – 1 |

=== South Division ===
==== (S1) Wichita Falls Wildcats vs. (S4) Odessa Jackalopes ====
| April 15 | Wichita Falls Wildcats | 6 – 3 | Odessa Jackalopes | Kay Yeager Coliseum |
| No scoring | | First period | Brandon Tucker (1) - 17:22; Pierce Pluemer (1) - 17:39; Zach Zech (1) - 18:42 |
| 0:26 - pp - Erich Jaeger (1); 11:11 - Jonathan Lazarus (1); 12:24 - Nikita Litviak (1); 14:04 - Aleksi Poikola (1); 19:33 - sh - Jeff Baum (1) | | Second period | No scoring |
| 5:53 - pp - André Pison (1) | | Third period | No scoring |
| Justin Kapelmaster (34 saves / 37 shots) | | Goalie stats | Dean Shatzer (30 saves / 36 shots); Jon Flakne (6 saves / 6 shots) |

| April 16 | Wichita Falls Wildcats | 5 – 0 | Odessa Jackalopes | Kay Yeager Coliseum |
| 0:50 - Aleksi Poikola (2); 2:44 - Nikita Litviak (2); 8:08 - pp - Aleksi Poikola (3) | | First period | No scoring |
| 0:32 - Nick Rosa (1); 5:18 - Garrett VanWyhe (1) | | Second period | No scoring |
| No scoring | | Third period | No scoring |
| Justin Kapelmaster (34 saves / 34 shots) | | Goalie stats | Dean Shatzer (9 saves / 12 shots); Jon Flakne (29 saves / 31 shots) |

| April 22 | Odessa Jackalopes | 3 – 6 | Wichita Falls Wildcats | Ector County Coliseum |
| No scoring | | First period | Austin Beaulieu (1) - 8:31; Austin Albrecht (1) - 14:01; Adam Goodsir (1) - 18:36 |
| 12:52 - Hampus Sjödahl (1) | | Second period | Austin Beaulieu (2) - 1:52; Austin Albrecht (2) - 14:55 |
| 8:20 - pp - Gray Marr (1); 8:59 - pp - Jake Levin (1) | | Third period | Austin Albrecht (3) - en - 18:45 |
| Jon Flakne (34 saves / 39 shots) | | Goalie stats | Justin Kapelmaster (30 saves / 33 shots) |

| Wichita wins series 3 – 0 |

==== (S2) Lone Star Brahmas vs. (S3) Topeka RoadRunners ====
| April 15 | Lone Star Brahmas | 3 – 1 | Topeka RoadRunners | NYTEX Sports Centre |
| No scoring | | First period | No scoring |
| 14:45 - Carson Kelley (1) | | Second period | No scoring |
| 9:07 - sh - Martin Mellberg (1); 14:35 - Tyler Drevitch (1) | | Third period | Dominic Lutz (1) - pp - 12:32 |
| Juho Niku (24 saves / 27 shots) | | Goalie stats | Corbin Kaczperski (14 saves / 15 shots) |

| April 16 | Lone Star Brahmas | 1 – 2 | OT | Topeka RoadRunners | NYTEX Sports Centre |
| 6:03 - Carson Kelley (2) | | First period | | No scoring |
| No scoring | | Second period | | Luka Maver (1) - pp - 5:29 |
| No scoring | | Third period | | No scoring |
| No scoring | | First overtime period | | Quinn Preston (1) - 5:52 |
| Corbin Kaczperski (21 saves / 23 shots) | | Goalie stats | | Juho Niku (28 saves / 29 shots) |

| April 22 | Topeka RoadRunners | 5 – 2 | Lone Star Brahmas | Stormont Vail Events Center |
| 6:11 - Quinn Preston (2); 19:14 - Yu Hikosaka (1) | | First period | No scoring |
| 4:41 - pp - Ryan O'Connor (1) | | Second period | Peter Kessel (1) - pp - 17:49; Tyler Drevitch (1) - 18:19 |
| 12:48 - Johnny Walker (1); 19:17 - en - J.B. Baker (1) | | Third period | No scoring |
| Juho Niku (23 saves / 25 shots) | | Goalie stats | Corbin Kaczperski (13 saves / 17 shots) |

| April 23 | Topeka RoadRunners | 5 – 4 | OT | Lone Star Brahmas | Stormont Vail Events Center |
| 9:17 - Jack Nickels (1); 10:42 - Andrew Hart (1) | | First period | | Hogan Davidson (1) - 9:03 |
| 3:27 - Max Harper (1); 18:05 - Quinn Preston (3) | | Second period | | Joseph Fallon (1) - 11:50 |
| No scoring | | Third period | | Peter Kessel (2) - 13:10; Tyler Drevitch (2) - 18:02 |
| 19:45 - Ryan O'Connor (2) | | First overtime period | | No scoring |
| Juho Niku (39 saves / 43 shots) | | Goalie stats | | Corbin Kaczperski (34 saves / 39 shots) |

| Topeka wins series 3 – 1 |

== Division Finals ==
=== Central Division ===
==== (C1) Bismarck Bobcats vs. (C2) Austin Bruins ====
| April 29 | Bismarck Bobcats | 5 – 1 | Austin Bruins | V.F.W. Sports Center |
| 0:44 - Solag Bakich (2); 13:27 - pp - Alex Strand (2); 17:19 - Parker Mismash (1) | | First period | No scoring |
| 1:12 - Aaron Herdt (4) | | Second period | No scoring |
| 5:31 - Alex Strand (3) | | Third period | Jacob Paganelli (4) - 7:21 |
| Hunter Shepard (25 saves / 26 shots) | | Goalie stats | Kristofer Carlson (13 saves / 18 shots); Robbie Goor (3 saves / 3 shots) |

| April 30 | Bismarck Bobcats | 4 – 1 | Austin Bruins | V.F.W. Sports Center |
| 18:28 - Tobias Fladeby (1) | | First period | No scoring |
| 1:54 - Travis Wood (1); 19:58 - pp - Jared Pike (1) | | Second period | Travis Kothenbeutel (1) - 13:55 |
| 4:15 - Willie Brown (2) | | Third period | No scoring |
| Hunter Shepard (25 saves / 26 shots) | | Goalie stats | Kristofer Carlson (26 saves / 30 shots) |

| May 6 | Austin Bruins | 7 – 0 | Bismarck Bobcats | Riverside Arena |
| No scoring | | First period | No scoring |
| 11:07 - pp - Jan Štefka (1); 11:21 - Austin Rueschhoff (3); 16:20 - Paul O’Connor (3); 18:10 - pp - Jan Štefka (2) | | Second period | No scoring |
| 8:02 - pp - A.J. Drobot (1); 8:05 - Miha Zajc (1); 19:43 - Jade Miller (4) | | Third period | No scoring |
| Kristofer Carlson (18 saves / 18 shots) | | Goalie stats | Hunter Shepard (19 saves / 23 shots); Nick Althaus (3 saves / 6 shots) |

| May 7 | Austin Bruins | 3 – 2 | Bismarck Bobcats | Riverside Arena |
| 10:03 - Evan Cholak (3); 15:36 - Jade Miller (5) | | First period | No scoring |
| No scoring | | Second period | Aaron Herdt (5) - 5:26; Nick Alexander (1) - 14:48 |
| 5:15 - sh - Miha Zajc (2) | | Third period | No scoring |
| Kristofer Carlson (26 saves / 28 shots) | | Goalie stats | Hunter Shepard (21 saves / 24 shots) |

| May 9 | Bismarck Bobcats | 4 – 0 | Austin Bruins | V.F.W. Sports Center |
| 0:13 - Solag Bakich (3); 16:21 - sh - Jared Pike (2) | | First period | No scoring |
| No scoring | | Second period | No scoring |
| 17:12 - en - Jared Pike (3); 19:40 - en - Solag Bakich (4) | | Third period | No scoring |
| Hunter Shepard (20 saves / 20 shots) | | Goalie stats | Kristofer Carlson (31 saves / 33 shots) |

| Bismarck wins series 3 – 2 |

=== East Division ===
==== (E1) Aston Rebels vs. (E3) Johnstown Tomahawks ====
| April 29 | Aston Rebels | 5 – 2 | Johnstown Tomahawks | Ice Works Complex |
| 1:39 - Eric Carreras (2); 15:10 - Andrew Bellant (3); 18:53 - Kristofers Bindulis (2) | | First period | Ryan Burr (1) - pp - 16:43 |
| 5:57 - Dean Balsamo (2) | | Second period | No scoring |
| 19:30 - en - Andrew Bellant (4) | | Third period | Brendan Jaquay (1) - 18:01 |
| Darion Hanson (18 saves / 20 shots) | | Goalie stats | Andrew Lindgren (15 saves / 19 shots) |

| April 30 | Aston Rebels | 4 – 3 | OT | Johnstown Tomahawks | Ice Works Complex |
| 12:39 - Andrew Bellant (5) | | First period | | Zak Galambos (2) - 15:07 |
| No scoring | | Second period | | Anthony Parrucci (2) - 14:54 |
| 2:03 - Drew Blackmun (1); 12:22 - Ryan Cusin (2) | | Third period | | Anthony Parrucci (3) - 6:00 |
| 3:41 - Eric Carreras (3) | | First overtime period | | No scoring |
| Darion Hanson (18 saves / 21 shots) | | Goalie stats | | Andrew Lindgren (24 saves / 28 shots) |

| May 6 | Johnstown Tomahawks | 2 – 9 | Aston Rebels | Cambria County War Memorial Arena |
| 4:25 - Luke Lynch (2) | | First period | Ryan Cusin (3) - 5:08; Austin Swingle (2) - 6:50; Dean Balsamo (3) - 10:02; Ryan Cusin (4) - 10:58 |
| No scoring | | Second period | Kristofers Bindulis (3) - pp - 5:08 |
| 2:56 - pp - Casey Linkenheld (4) | | Third period | Colton McMenamin (1) - 8:24; Chris Deprez (1) - sh - en - 13:01; Austin Swingle (3) - en - 13:48; Ryan Cusin (5) - en - 17:05 |
| Andrew Lindgren (15 saves / 21 shots) | | Goalie stats | Trevor Micucci (35 saves / 37 shots) |

| Aston wins series 3 – 0 |

=== Midwest Division ===
==== (MW1) Fairbanks Ice Dogs vs. (MW3) Minnesota Wilderness ====
| April 29 | Fairbanks Ice Dogs | 2 – 1 | OT | Minnesota Wilderness | Big Dipper Ice Arena |
| 10:59 - Todd Burgess (2) | | First period | | No scoring |
| No scoring | | Second period | | No scoring |
| No scoring | | Third period | | Koby Bender (1) - 7:46 |
| 6:08 - Mitchell Baumann (1) | | First overtime period | | No scoring |
| Gavin Nieto (19 saves / 20 shots) | | Goalie stats | | Luke Kania (31 saves / 33 shots) |

| April 30 | Fairbanks Ice Dogs | 3 – 2 | OT | Minnesota Wilderness | Big Dipper Ice Arena |
| No scoring | | First period | | No scoring |
| 17:10 - Adam Anderson (1) | | Second period | | Casey Gilling (3) - 17:32 |
| 14:41 - Jakob Stridsberg (4) | | Third period | | Isak Bergland (1) - 15:33 |
| 2:33 - pp - Reggie Lutz (3) | | First overtime period | | No scoring |
| Gavin Nieto (32 saves / 34 shots) | | Goalie stats | | Luke Kania (31 saves / 34 shots) |

| May 6 | Minnesota Wilderness | 2 – 1 | 2OT | Fairbanks Ice Dogs | Northwoods Credit Union Arena |
| 18:15 - Alex Toscano (2) | | First period | | No scoring |
| No scoring | | Second period | | No scoring |
| No scoring | | Third period | | Reggie Lutz (4) - 4:30 |
| 17:40 - Brett Heikkila (1) | | Second overtime period | | No scoring |
| Luke Kania (37 saves / 38 shots) | | Goalie stats | | Gavin Nieto (27 saves / 29 shots) |

| May 7 | Minnesota Wilderness | 3 – 2 | Fairbanks Ice Dogs | Northwoods Credit Union Arena |
| 2:08 - Aaron Miller (2); 15:33 - pp - Alex Toscano (3) | | First period | No scoring |
| No scoring | | Second period | Evan Somoza (1) - 16:31; Todd Burgess (3) - 19:23 |
| 16:30 - Alex Trapp (1) | | Third period | No scoring |
| Luke Kania (18 saves / 20 shots) | | Goalie stats | Gavin Nieto (14 saves / 17 shots) |

| May 8 | Minnesota Wilderness | 2 – 5 | Fairbanks Ice Dogs | Northwoods Credit Union Arena |
| No scoring | | First period | 2:35 - Cayden Cahill (2) |
| Ryan Bloom (3) - 12:55 | | Second period | 2:06 - Todd Burgess (4); 8:41 - Tyler Tomberlin (1) |
| Tyler Vold (1) - 4:40 | | Third period | 7:35 - Logan Coomes (2); 19:10 - pp - en - Todd Burgess (5) |
| Luke Kania (34 saves / 38 shots) | | Goalie stats | Gavin Nieto (35 saves / 37 shots) |

| Fairbanks wins series 3 – 2 |

=== South Division ===
==== (S1) Wichita Falls Wildcats vs. (S3) Topeka RoadRunners ====
| April 29 | Wichita Falls Wildcats | 3 –1 | Topeka RoadRunners | Kay Yeager Coliseum |
| 13:29 - Austin Albrecht (4) | | First period | Andrew Hart (2) - 13:05 |
| No scoring | | Second period | No scoring |
| 13:42 - Jonathan Lazarus (2); 15:53 - Erich Jaeger (2) | | Third period | No scoring |
| Justin Kapelmaster (36 saves / 37 shots) | | Goalie stats | Juho Niku (33 saves / 36 shots) |

| April 30 | Wichita Falls Wildcats | 5 – 4 | Topeka RoadRunners | Kay Yeager Coliseum |
| 12:17 - pp - Aleksi Poikola (4) | | First period | Jack Nickels (2) - 5:22 |
| 4:32 - Austin Beaulieu (3) | | Second period | No scoring |
| 4:42 - pp - Adam Goodsir (2); 7:44 - Austin Albrecht (5); 16:14 - Aleksi Poikola (5) | | Third period | Sami Tavernier (1) - 1:31 |
| Justin Kapelmaster (30 saves / 34 shots) | | Goalie stats | Juho Niku (27 saves / 32 shots) |

| May 2 | Topeka RoadRunners | 1 – 2 | 2OT | Wichita Falls Wildcats | Kansas Expocentre |
| 5:48 - Marshall Bowery (1) | | First period | | 12:53 - Austin Beaulieu (4) |
| No scoring | | Second period | | No scoring |
| No scoring | | Third period | | No scoring |
| No scoring | | Second overtime period | | 14:15 - André Pison (2) |
| Tyler Johnson (37 saves / 39 shots) | | Goalie stats | | Justin Kapelmaster (41 saves / 42 shots) |

| Wichita Falls wins series 3 – 0 |

== Semifinals ==
=== (MW1) Fairbanks Ice Dogs vs. (E1) Aston Rebels ===
| May 12 | Fairbanks Ice Dogs | 2 – 1 | Aston Rebels | Braemar Arena |
| No scoring | | First period | Dom Garcia (1) - pp - 5:35 |
| 18:03 - Reggie Lutz (5) | | Second period | No scoring |
| 11:46 - Reggie Lutz (6) | | Third period | No scoring |
| Gavin Nieto (29 saves / 30 shots) | | Goalie stats | Darion Hanson (24 saves / 26 shots) |

| May 13 | Aston Rebels | 0 – 3 | Fairbanks Ice Dogs | Braemar Arena |
| No scoring | | First period | 9:14 - Reggie Lutz (7) |
| No scoring | | Second period | 16:05 - Reggie Lutz (8) |
| No scoring | | Third period | 17:32 - en - Tyler Tomberlin (2) |
| Darion Hanson (25 saves / 27 shots) | | Goalie stats | Gavin Nieto (25 saves / 25 shots) |

| Fairbanks wins series 2 – 0 |

=== (S1) Wichita Falls Wildcats vs. (C1) Bismarck Bobcats ===
| May 12 | Wichita Falls Wildcats | 3 – 2 | Bismarck Bobcats | Braemar Arena |
| 3:10 - Jake Dalton (1) | | First period | Oskars Batņa (3) - 1:18 |
| 6:34 - Ryan Burnett (1) | | Second period | Willie Brown (3) - 2:34 |
| 17:26 - Ryan Burnett (2) | | Third period | No scoring |
| Justin Kapelmaster (21 saves / 23 shots) | | Goalie stats | Hunter Shepard (39 saves / 42 shots) |

| May 13 | Bismarck Bobcats | 2 – 5 | Wichita Falls Wildcats | Braemar Arena |
| Willie Brown (4) - 1:31 | | First period | 4:09 - André Pison (3); 16:40 - Michael Rounds (1) |
| Alex Strand (4) - pp - 6:03 | | Second period | 1:02 - pp - Austin Albrecht (6); 15:01 - Nick Rosa (2) |
| No scoring | | Third period | 19:09 - en - Nikita Litviak (3) |
| Hunter Shepard (40 saves / 44 shots) | | Goalie stats | Justin Kapelmaster (24 saves / 26 shots) |

| Wichita Falls wins series 2 – 0 |

== Robertson Cup Final ==
=== (MW1) Fairbanks Ice Dogs vs. (S1) Wichita Falls Wildcats ===
| May 15 | Fairbanks Ice Dogs | 2 – 0 | Wichita Falls Wildcats | Braemar Arena |
| No scoring | | First period | No scoring |
| No scoring | | Second period | No scoring |
| 9:06 - Reggie Lutz (9); 9:53 - Josef Ingman (2) | | Third period | No scoring |
| Gavin Nieto (31 saves / 31 shots) | | Goalie stats | Justin Kapelmaster (29 saves / 31 shots) |
