= 2014–15 NAHL season =

- League: North American Hockey League
- Sport: Ice hockey
- Duration: Regular season September 12, 2014 – March 29, 2015; Postseason; April 2 – May 16, 2015
- Games: 60
- Teams: 24

Draft
- Top draft pick: Hunter Anderson
- Picked by: Janesville Jets

Regular season
- Season champions: Janesville Jets
- Season MVP: Sebastian Vidmar (Lone Star Brahmas)
- Top scorer: Sebastian Vidmar (Lone Star Brahmas)

Robertson Cup Playoffs
- Finals champions: Minnesota Wilderness
- Runners-up: Austin Bruins

NAHL seasons
- ← 2013–14 2015–16 →

The 2014–15 NAHL season was the 31st season of the North American Hockey League. The regular season ran from September 2014 to April 2015 with a 60-game schedule for each team. The Janesville Jets won the regular season championship. The Minnesota Wilderness defeated the Austin Bruins 2 games to 1 in the championship round to capture the Robertson Cup.

== Member changes ==
- The Jamestown Ironmen, who had not participated in the previous season, were formally disbanded.
- In May, the Port Huron Fighting Falcons announced that they were relocating to Connellsville, Pennsylvania and would become the Keystone Ice Miners. However, by December, the franchise's owners walked away from the club. The NAHL assumed control for the remainder of the season with the idea of dissolving the club at the end of the year.

== Regular season ==
The standings at the end of the regular season were as follows:

Note: x = clinched playoff berth; y = clinched division title; z = clinched regular season title

=== Standings ===
==== Central Division ====
Team	GP	W	L	OTL	Pts	GF	GA
xy – Austin Bruins	60	38	11	11	87	210	136
x – Minot Minotauros	60	37	17	6	80	184	137
x – Bismarck Bobcats	60	30	26	4	64	185	185
x – Aberdeen Wings	60	27	31	2	56	142	165
Brookings Blizzard	60	19	32	9	47	141	206

==== Midwest Division ====
Team	GP	W	L	OTL	Pts	GF	GA
xy – Fairbanks Ice Dogs	60	40	16	4	84	238	167
x – Minnesota Wilderness	60	39	15	6	84	209	152
x – Coulee Region Chill	60	28	23	9	65	176	182
x – Minnesota Magicians	60	21	35	4	46	160	221
Kenai River Brown Bears	60	16	42	2	34	132	244

==== North Division ====
Team	GP	W	L	OTL	Pts	GF	GA
xyz – Janesville Jets	60	49	9	2	100	215	114
x – Keystone Ice Miners	60	31	24	5	67	153	140
x – Soo Eagles	60	31	25	4	66	182	185
x – Michigan Warriors	60	25	26	9	59	148	183
Johnstown Tomahawks	60	25	27	8	58	166	191
Springfield Jr. Blues	60	23	31	6	52	126	184

==== South Division ====
Team	GP	W	L	OTL	Pts	GF	GA
xy – Lone Star Brahmas	60	40	12	8	88	208	130
x – Topeka RoadRunners	60	39	15	6	84	199	140
x – Wichita Falls Wildcats	60	39	16	5	83	242	182
x – Corpus Christi IceRays	60	31	24	5	67	186	196
x – Wenatchee Wild	60	27	26	7	61	177	171
x – Rio Grande Valley Killer Bees	60	25	25	10	60	153	184
Amarillo Bulls	60	25	31	4	54	174	222
Odessa Jackalopes	60	15	38	7	37	172	261

=== Statistics ===
==== Scoring leaders ====
The following players led the league in regular season points at the completion of all regular season games.

Player	Team	GP	G	A	Pts	PIM
Sebastian Vidmar	Lone Star Brahmas	58	35	45	80	39
Chandler Madry	Fairbanks Ice Dogs	60	22	55	77	34
Wes Michaud	Corpus Christi IceRays	58	30	43	73	59
Kenny Hausinger	Odessa Jackalopes	57	25	43	68	72
Adam Lovick	Coulee Region Chill	60	30	36	66	88
Ethan Somoza	Fairbanks Ice Dogs	60	30	35	65	43
Jacob Hetz	Fairbanks Ice Dogs	60	28	35	63	77
Zach LaValle	Janesville Jets	58	20	41	61	26
Darian Romanko	Minnesota Wilderness	54	31	30	61	48
Aaron Miller	Minnesota Wilderness	59	21	39	60	109
Colin Staub	Wichita Falls Wildcats	60	26	34	60	12

==== Leading goaltenders ====
Note: GP = Games played; Mins = Minutes played; W = Wins; L = Losses; OTL = Overtime losses; SOL = Shootout losses; GA = Goals against; SO = Shutouts; GAA = Goals against average; SV% = Save percentage

Player	Team	GP	Mins	W	L	OTL	SOL	GA	SO	SV%	GAA
Matt Jurusik	Janesville Jets	40	2286:06	33	5	0	0	60	7	.937	1.58
Matej Tomek	Topeka RoadRunners	33	1937:45	24	7	0	2	59	6	.924	1.83
Atte Tolvanen	Minot Minotauros	45	2691:40	26	13	1	4	87	6	.919	1.94
T. J. Black	Lone Star Brahmas	35	1955:30	21	8	2	2	65	3	.906	1.99
Jake Kielly	Austin Bruins	32	1950:54	20	5	1	5	69	3	.901	2.12

== Robertson Cup playoffs ==
Teams are reseeded prior to the semifinal round based upon regular season records.

Division Play-in (Best-of-3)	Division Semifinals (Best-of-5)
C1	Austin Bruins	8	4	4	-	-
C4	Aberdeen Wings	5	0	3	-	-
Central Division
C2	Minot Minotauros	4	4	2	-	-
C3	Bismarck Bobcats	1	2	1	-	-
MW1	Fairbanks Ice Dogs	5*	4	4	-	-
MW4	Minnesota Magicians	4	0	1	-	-
Midwest Division
MW2	Minnesota Wilderness	2	1	5	9	9
MW3	Coulee Region Chill	4	3	4	1	1
N1	Janesville Jets	8	6	7	-	-
N4	Michigan Warriors	1	2	4	-	-
North Division
N2	Keystone Ice Miners	1	0	1	-	-
N3	Soo Eagles	6	1*	3	-	-
S1	Lone Star Brahmas	2**	2	3	-	-
S5	Wenatchee Wild	1	1	1	-	-
S4	Corpus Christi Ice Rays	2	2	-
S5	Wenatchee Wild	3*	3	-
South Division
S2	Topeka RoadRunners	6	0	3	5	-
S3	Wichita Falls Wildcats	2	7	2	3	-
S3	Wichita Falls Wildcats	4	5	-
S6	Rio Grande Valley Killer Bees	2	4	-

Division Finals (Best-of-5)
C1	Austin Bruins	2	4	4	3	4
C2	Minot Minotauros	3	1	1	4	3
MW1	Fairbanks Ice Dogs	1	2	3	-	-
MW2	Minnesota Wilderness	2	4	6	-	-
N1	Janesville Jets	5	5	0	6	-
N3	Soo Eagles	0	1	4	2	-
S1	Lone Star Brahmas	1	5*	3	3*	-
S2	Topeka RoadRunners	5	4	2	2	-

Semifinal (Best-of-3)
1	Janesville Jets	1	1	-
4	Minnesota Wilderness	2	2*	-
2	Lone Star Brahmas	1	3	2
3	Austin Bruins	3	1	3*

Championship (Best-of-3)
4	Minnesota Wilderness	2****	4	-
3	Austin Bruins	1	0	-

Note: * denotes overtime period(s)

== Division Play–in ==
=== South Division ===
==== (S4) Corpus Christi Ice Rays vs. (S5) Wenatchee Wild ====
April 3	Corpus Christi Ice Rays	2 – 3	OT	Wenatchee Wild	American Bank Center
6:37 - Frankie Melton (1)		First period		David Powlowski (1) - 17:31
17:50 - Westin Michaud (1)		Second period		Brendan Harris (1) - 15:27
No scoring		Third period		No scoring
No scoring		First overtime period		August von Ungern Kuzara (1) - 2:13
Andrew Lindgren (36 saves / 39 shots)		Goalie stats		Zach Quinn (31 saves / 33 shots)

April 4	Corpus Christi Ice Rays	2 – 3	Wenatchee Wild	American Bank Center
No scoring		First period	Colin Burston (1) - 5:00; Michael Coyne (1) - 13:18
No scoring		Second period	No scoring
17:36 - pp - Tanner Lomsnes (1); 18:50 - Connor Kelly (1)		Third period	August von Ungern Kuzara (2) - 12:38
Andrew Lindgren (44 saves / 47 shots)		Goalie stats	Zach Quinn (24 saves / 26 shots)

Wenatchee wins series 2 – 0

==== (S3) Wichita Falls Wildcats vs. (S6) Rio Grande Valley Killer Bees ====
April 2	Wichita Falls Wildcats	4 – 2	Rio Grande Valley Killer Bees	Kay Yeager Coliseum
3:07 - Evan Okeley (1)		First period	Stathis Soumelidis (1) - 7:40; Austin Swingle (1) - pp - 10:39
No scoring		Second period	No scoring
1:18 - pp - Nick Farmer (1); 6:16 - Austin Albrecht (1); 13:51 - Colin Staub (1)		Third period	No scoring
Austin Shaw (18 saves / 20 shots)		Goalie stats	Ben Johansson (31 saves / 35 shots)

April 3	Wichita Falls Wildcats	5 – 4	Rio Grande Valley Killer Bees	Kay Yeager Coliseum
No scoring		First period	Logan Wendling (1) - 3:10; Logan Wendling (2) - 8:24
2:02 - pp - Matt Koch (1); 5:07 - Jonathan Lazarus (1); 10:26 - Austin Beaulieu (1)		Second period	Mason Van Tuyl (1) - 5:49
3:01 - Colin Staub (1); 4:40 - pp - Tommy Apap (1)		Third period	Stathis Soumelidis (2) - pp - 9:03
Austin Shaw (6 saves / 8 shots); David Zevnik (19 saves / 21 shots)		Goalie stats	Ben Johansson (22 saves / 27 shots)

Wichita Falls wins series 2 – 0

== Division Semifinals ==
=== Central Division ===
==== (C1) Austin Bruins vs. (C4) Aberdeen Wings ====
April 3	Austin Bruins	8 – 5	Aberdeen Wings	Riverside Arena
5:31 - Ian Scheid (1)		First period	Will Hammer (1) - 1:34; Colin Raver (1) - 5:00; Will Hammer (2) - 16:53
3:22 - Tony Uglem (1); 6:49 - Trevor Boyd (1); 10:53 - Luke Dietsch (1); 12:36 - Jade Miller (1)		Second period	No scoring
10:27 - Nico Sturm (1); 18:37 - Ian Scheid (2); 19:41 - en - Nico Sturm (2)		Third period	Ryan Cook (1) - pp - 6:24; Will Hammer (3) - 15:11
Evan Smith (20 saves / 25 shots)		Goalie stats	Luke Kania (24 saves / 31 shots)

April 4	Austin Bruins	4 – 0	Aberdeen Wings	Riverside Arena
1:38 - pp - Luke Dietsch (2); 16:50 - Jakob Kullberg (1)		First period	No scoring
7:37 - John Carter MacLean (1)		Second period	No scoring
18:59 - Nico Sturm (3)		Third period	No scoring
Jake Kielly (19 saves / 19 shots)		Goalie stats	Andrew Shortridge (26 saves / 30 shots)

April 10	Aberdeen Wings	3 – 4	Austin Bruins	Odde Ice Center
No scoring		First period	Luke Forfar (1) - pp - 10:27; Brian Bachnak (1) - 17:59
17:11 - Will Hammer (3)		Second period	No scoring
8:22 - Tucker DeYoung (1); 12:04 - pp - Tucker DeYoung (2)		Third period	Riese Zmolek (1) - 4:39; Nico Sturm (4) - 18:04
Andrew Shortridge (38 saves / 42 shots)		Goalie stats	Jake Kielly (19 saves / 22 shots)

Austin wins series 3 – 0

==== (C1) Minot Minotauros vs. (C4) Bismarck Bobcats ====
April 3	Minot Minotauros	4 – 1	Bismarck Bobcats	Maysa Arena
No scoring		First period	Jared Pike (1) - 6:09
16:08 - Nick Monfils (1); 16:18 - Christian Mohs (1); 19:50 - Nick Monfils (2)		Second period	No scoring
7:46 - Nick Monfils (3)		Third period	No scoring
Atte Tolvanen (19 saves / 20 shots)		Goalie stats	Alex Bitsakis (28 saves / 32 shots)

April 4	Bismarck Bobcats	2 – 4	Minot Minotauros	V.F.W. Sports Center
Oskars Batņa (1) - 12:06		First period	11:03 - Jacob Howie (1)
Evan Giesler (1) - 14:41		Second period	6:32 - pp - James Mathias (1)
No scoring		Third period	14:15 - sh - John Snodgrass (1); 19:17 - en - Colton Kramer (1)
Hunter Shepard (16 saves / 19 shots)		Goalie stats	Atte Tolvanen (21 saves / 23 shots)

April 10	Minot Minotauros	2 – 1	Bismarck Bobcats	Maysa Arena
Tim Athley (1) - 5:01		First period	No scoring
No scoring		Second period	5:01 - pp - Tanner Salsberry (1)
Johnny Walker (1) - 13:22		Third period	No scoring
Atte Tolvanen (19 saves / 20 shots)		Goalie stats	Hunter Shepard (35 saves / 37 shots)

Minot wins series 3 – 0

=== Midwest Division ===
==== (MW1) Fairbanks Ice Dogs vs. (MW4) Minnesota Magicians ====
April 10	Fairbanks Ice Dogs	5 – 4	OT	Minnesota Magicians	Big Dipper Ice Arena
5:18 - Adam Wilcox (1)		First period		Sam Becker (1) - 5:41
12:16 - Jacob Hetz (1); 16:00 - Yannick Vedel (1); 19:53 - Ethan Somoza (1)		Second period		Nathan Krusko (1) - 2:05; Nolan Schaeffer (1) - 14:56
No scoring		Third period		Lukas Laub (1) - 10:45
15:33 - Chandler Madry (1)		First overtime period		No scoring
Kevin Aldridge (32 saves / 36 shots)		Goalie stats		Vaughan Ahrens (58 saves / 63 shots)

April 11	Fairbanks Ice Dogs	4 – 0	Minnesota Magicians	Big Dipper Ice Arena
2:37 - pp - Jacob Hetz (2); 4:30 - Todd Burgess (1); 11:58 - Chandler Madry (1)		First period	No scoring
1:19 - Hans Gorowsky (1)		Second period	No scoring
No scoring		Third period	No scoring
Patrick Munson (25 saves / 25 shots)		Goalie stats	Vaughan Ahrens (38 saves / 42 shots)

April 17	Minnesota Magicians	1 – 4	Fairbanks Ice Dogs	Richfield Ice Arena
2:37 - Austin Jackson (1)		First period	Jesper Öhrval (1) - 7:33
No scoring		Second period	No scoring
No scoring		Third period	Ethan Somoza (2) - 5:16; Jacob Hetz (3) - 10:49; Todd Burgess (2) - en - 19:45
Vaughan Ahrens (28 saves / 31 shots)		Goalie stats	Patrick Munson (22 saves / 23 shots)

Fairbanks wins series 3 – 0

==== (MW2) Aberdeen Wings vs. (MW3) Coulee Region Chill ====
April 10	Minnesota Wilderness	2 – 4	Coulee Region Chill	Northwoods Credit Union Arena
12:42 - Niklas Lehtimäki (1)		First period	Adam Lovick (1) - 6:38
19:55 - Aaron Miller (1)		Second period	Jackson Charlesworth (1) - 15:40
No scoring		Third period	Joe Rutkowski (1) - 2:39; Brogan Rafferty (1) - en - 19:18
Brock Kautz (17 saves / 20 shots)		Goalie stats	Adam Carlson (22 saves / 24 shots)

April 11	Minnesota Wilderness	1 – 3	Coulee Region Chill	Northwoods Credit Union Arena
No scoring		First period	No scoring
16:01 - Ian Mansfield (1)		Second period	Richard Zehnal (1) - 3:16
No scoring		Third period	Kevin Shand (1) - 6:57; Adam Lovick (2) - 9:27
Ryan Anderson (15 saves / 18 shots)		Goalie stats	Adam Carlson (35 saves / 36 shots)

April 17	Coulee Region Chill	4 – 5	Minnesota Wilderness	Green Island Ice Arena
No scoring		First period	Brett Heikkila (1) - 11:06; Dan Litchke (1) - 18:05
No scoring		Second period	Michael Covach (1) - pp - 6:05; Dan Litchke (2) - 12:36
2:37 - Richard Zehnal (2); 7:43 - pp - Nico Luka (1); 10:12 - Charlie Parker (1); 11:23 - Adam Lovick (3)		Third period	Tyler Cline (1) - 6:10
Adam Carlson (21 saves / 25 shots); Jimmy Thomas (16 saves / 17 shots)		Goalie stats	Brock Kautz (42 saves / 46 shots)

April 18	Coulee Region Chill	1 – 9	Minnesota Wilderness	Green Island Ice Arena
No scoring		First period	Michael Covach (2) - pp - 5:19
No scoring		Second period	Dan Litchke (3) - 0:17; Wayland Williams (1) - 9:54; Jānis Jaks (1) - 12:24
10:06 - Dawson DiPietro (1)		Third period	Aaron Miller (2) - 2:03; Brock Kautz (1) - 7:56; Darian Romanko (1) - 15:04; Michael Covach (3) - 16:00; Ian Mansfield (2) - 16:35
Adam Carlson (27 saves / 33 shots); Jimmy Thomas (7 saves / 10 shots)		Goalie stats	Brock Kautz (24 saves / 25 shots)

April 20	Minnesota Wilderness	9 – 1	Coulee Region Chill	Northwoods Credit Union Arena
4:40 - sh - Dan Litchke (4); 10:05 - pp - Tyler Cline (2)		First period	No scoring
0:31 - Billy Exell (1); 4:01 - Niklas Lehtimäki (2); 7:13 - pp - Dan Litchke (5); 8:43 - Aaron Miller (3); 13:46 - pp - Tyler Cline (3); 14:58 - Darian Romanko (2)		Second period	No scoring
5:44 - Niklas Lehtimäki (3)		Third period	Sean Lang (1) - 0:29
Brock Kautz (13 saves / 13 shots); Ryan Anderson (7 saves / 8 shots)		Goalie stats	Adam Carlson (16 saves / 22 shots); Jimmy Thomas (14 saves / 17 shots)

Minnesota wins series 3 – 2

=== North Division ===
==== (N1) Janesville Jets vs. (N4) Michigan Warriors ====
April 10	Janesville Jets	8 – 1	Michigan Warriors	Janesville Ice Arena
8:00 - Adam Winborg (1)		First period	No scoring
0:28 - pp - Adam Winborg (2)		Second period	Ryan Burr (1) - pp - 9:05
11:39 - Brandon Schultz (1); 13:10 - Cullen Munson (1); 14:35 - pp - Cullen Munson (2); 15:27 - pp - Aleksi Ainail (1); 16:40 - pp - Zach Solow (1); 17:36 - pp - Cullen Munson (3)		Third period	No scoring
Matt Jurusik (23 saves / 24 shots)		Goalie stats	Chase Munroe (29 saves / 36 shots); Ryan Wischow (0 saves / 1 shot)

April 11	Janesville Jets	6 – 2	Michigan Warriors	Janesville Ice Arena
No scoring		First period	Garrison Sanipass (1) - 4:56
4:54 - Daniel Kucerovy (1); 6:26 - Grant Hutton (1); 13:28 - pp - Adam Winborg (2); 16:21 - Daniel Kucerovy (2); 18:37 - Brandon Schultz (2)		Second period	Alex Berardinelli (1) - pp - 10:03
13:03 - pp - Zach LaValle (1)		Third period	No scoring
Matt Jurusik (27 saves / 29 shots)		Goalie stats	Ryan Wischow (31 saves / 37 shots)

April 17	Michigan Warriors	4 – 7	Janesville Jets	Dort Event Center
8:03 - Derek Frentz (1); 10:48 - A.J. Marcinek (1)		First period	Cullen Munson (4) - 6:51; Drew Callin (1) - pp - 19:30
14:01 - Cody Kuster (1)		Second period	Brandon Schultz (3) - pp - 18:14; Zach Yoder (1) - 19:42
3:20 - Alex Berardinelli (2)		Third period	Zach LaValle (2) - pp - 7:56; Brandon Schultz (4) - en - 18:31; Zach Solow (2) - en - 19:54
Chase Munroe (36 saves / 41 shots)		Goalie stats	Matt Jurusik (29 saves / 33 shots)

Janesville wins series 3 – 0

==== (N2) Keystone Ice Miners vs. (N3) Soo Eagles ====
April 10	Keystone Ice Miners	1 – 6	Soo Eagles	The Ice Mine
No scoring		First period	Bradley Pung (1) - 8:12; Matthew Menta (1) - sh - 10:26; Matthew Menta (2) - 14:09
2:19 - Lordanthony Grissom (1)		Second period	Darren Brady (1) - 1:08
No scoring		Third period	Sandis Zolmanis (1) - 14:22; Raymond Brice (1) - 17:50
Alex Blankenburg (3 saves / 6 shots); Nick Kossoff (13 saves / 16 shots)		Goalie stats	Chad Catt (34 saves / 35 shots)

April 11	Keystone Ice Miners	0 – 1	OT	Soo Eagles	The Ice Mine
No scoring		First period		No scoring
No scoring		Second period		No scoring
No scoring		Third period		No scoring
No scoring		First overtime period		Trevor Cope (1) - 3:46
Nick Kossoff (20 saves / 21 shots)		Goalie stats		Chad Catt (32 saves / 32 shots)

April 17	Soo Eagles	3 – 1	Keystone Ice Miners	Pullar Stadium
16:18 - Keegan Miller (1)		First period	No scoring
14:50 - Leo Lumm (1)		Second period	Cameron Smith (1) - 10:45
3:47 - pp - Trevor Cope (2)		Third period	No scoring
Chad Catt (38 saves / 39 shots)		Goalie stats	Nick Kossoff (24 saves / 27 shots)

Soo wins series 3 – 0

=== South Division ===
==== (S1) Lone Star Brahmas vs. (S5) Wenatchee Wild ====
April 10	Lone Star Brahmas	2 – 1	2OT	Wenatchee Wild	NYTEX Sports Centre
No scoring		First period		Brendan Harris (2) - 7:20
14:29 - Ludvig Larsson (1)		Second period		No scoring
No scoring		Third period		No scoring
6:05 - Roman Uchyn (1)		Second overtime period		No scoring
Jake Kupsky (35 saves / 36 shots)		Goalie stats		Zach Quinn (28 saves / 30 shots)

April 11	Lone Star Brahmas	2 – 1	Wenatchee Wild	NYTEX Sports Centre
13:10 - pp - Anton Santesson (1)		First period	No scoring
17:28 - Sebastian Vidmar (1)		Second period	No scoring
No scoring		Third period	Ryan Gotelaere (1) - pp - 3:55
Jake Kupsky (28 saves / 29 shots)		Goalie stats	Michael Bullion (13 saves / 15 shots)

April 17	Wenatchee Wild	1 – 3	Lone Star Brahmas	Town Toyota Center
No scoring		First period	Peter Kessel (1) - 19:33
7:20 - Chris Jones (1)		Second period	Cody Wickline (1) - 2:02
No scoring		Third period	A.J. Vanderbeck (1) - en - 19:24
Zach Quinn (7 saves / 9 shots); Michael Bullion (15 saves / 15 shots)		Goalie stats	Jake Kupsky (37 saves / 38 shots)

Lone Star wins series 3 – 0

==== (S2) Topeka RoadRunners vs. (S3) Wichita Falls Wildcats ====
April 10	Topeka RoadRunners	6 – 2	Wichita Falls Wildcats	Kansas Expocentre
11:07 - Sly Sutter (1)		First period	No scoring
15:45 - Dominic Lutz (1)		Second period	Kevin Charyszyn (1) - 19:54
2:39 - Yu Hikosaka (1); 2:55 - Daniel Rzavský (1); 8:39 - Sly Sutter (2); 13:10 - Cam Strong (1)		Third period	Shane Kuzmeski (1) - 10:26
Matej Tomek (19 saves / 21 shots)		Goalie stats	David Zevnik (18 saves / 24 shots)

April 11	Wichita Falls Wildcats	7 – 0	Topeka RoadRunners	Kay Yeager Coliseum
Nikita Litviak (1) - 2:36		First period	No scoring
Shane Kuzmeski (2) - 1:40; Shane Kuzmeski (3) - 15:22		Second period	No scoring
Nick Farmer (2) - 4:01; Max Reisinger (1) - 6:11; Kevin Charyszyn (2) - pp - 7:53; Jonathan Lazarus (2) - 8:07		Third period	No scoring
Austin Shaw (23 saves / 23 shots)		Goalie stats	Matej Tomek (22 saves / 27 shots); Drew Vogler (13 saves / 15 shots)

April 13	Wichita Falls Wildcats	2 – 3	Topeka RoadRunners	Kay Yeager Coliseum
11:01 - Jeff Baum (1)		First period	No scoring
6:16 - pp - Tommy Apap (2)		Second period	Sly Sutter (3) - 7:31; J.B. Baker (1) - pp - 10:28
No scoring		Third period	Daniel Brickley (1) - pp - 1:58
Austin Shaw (23 saves / 26 shots)		Goalie stats	Matej Tomek (20 saves / 22 shots)

April 14	Wichita Falls Wildcats	3 – 5	Topeka RoadRunners	Kay Yeager Coliseum
9:33 - pp - Tommy Apap (3); 11:59 - Austin Albrecht (2)		First period	No scoring
5:41 - Shane Kuzmeski (4)		Second period	Sly Sutter (4) - pp - 10:06; Carlos Fornaris (1) - pp - 12:52
No scoring		Third period	Yu Hikosaka (2) - pp - 6:27; Daniel Brickley (2) - 12:28; Tyler Irvine (1) - en - 19:12
Austin Shaw (30 saves / 34 shots)		Goalie stats	Matej Tomek (28 saves / 31 shots)

Topeka wins series 3 – 1

== Division Finals ==
=== Central Division ===
==== (C1) Austin Bruins vs. (C2) Minot Minotauros ====
April 24	Austin Bruins	2 – 3	Minot Minotauros	Riverside Arena
No scoring		First period	John Snodgrass (2) - 7:43
13:04 - pp - Derek Olmschenk (1)		Second period	James Mathias (2) - 2:56; John Snodgrass (3) - 7:43
0:51 - Josh Wilkins (1)		Third period	No scoring
Jake Kielly (24 saves / 27 shots)		Goalie stats	Atte Tolvanen (31 saves / 33 shots)

April 25	Austin Bruins	4 – 1	Minot Minotauros	Riverside Arena
5:01 - Alex Jasiek (1); 14:02 - John Carter MacLean (2); 17:36 - pp - Luke Dietsch (3)		First period	No scoring
No scoring		Second period	James Mathias (3) - sh - 9:41
18:53 - en - Alexander Pettersson (1)		Third period	No scoring
Evan Smith (26 saves / 27 shots)		Goalie stats	Atte Tolvanen (20 saves / 23 shots)

May 1	Minot Minotauros	1 – 4	Austin Bruins	Maysa Arena
No scoring		First period	Alex Pettersson (2) - 10:32; Josh Wilkins (2) - 11:36
No scoring		Second period	No scoring
13:13 - pp - Nate Pionk (1)		Third period	Derek Olmschenk (2) - pp - 6:24; Nico Sturm (5) - en - 18:24
Atte Tolvanen (29 saves / 32 shots)		Goalie stats	Evan Smith (27 saves / 28 shots)

May 2	Minot Minotauros	4 – 3	Austin Bruins	Maysa Arena
0:35 - Max Mettler (1); 3:45 - Jacob Howie (2); 19:22 - pp - Chase Springman (1)		First period	Liam Feeney (1) - pp - 10:00
6:11 - pp - Nate Pionk (2)		Second period	No scoring
No scoring		Third period	Luke Forfar (2) - 8:23; Alex Jasiek (2) - 18:41
Atte Tolvanen (41 saves / 44 shots)		Goalie stats	Evan Smith (7 saves / 10 shots); Jake Kielly (18 saves / 19 shots)

May 4	Austin Bruins	4 – 3	Minot Minotauros	Riverside Arena
10:17 - Luke Dietsch (4)		First period	Tim Athley (2) - 12:47
10:16 - Nico Sturm (6); 12:27 - pp - Josh Wilkins (3); 15:50 - Trevor Boyd (2)		Second period	No scoring
No scoring		Third period	Nick Monfils (4) - 3:38; Johnny Walker (2) - 6:15
Jake Kielly (18 saves / 21 shots)		Goalie stats	Atte Tolvanen (19 saves / 23 shots)

Austin wins series 3 – 2

=== Midwest Division ===
==== (MW1) Fairbanks Ice Dogs vs. (MW2) Minnesota Wilderness ====
April 24	Minnesota Wilderness	2 – 1	Fairbanks Ice Dogs	Northwoods Credit Union Arena
No scoring		First period	5:27 - Mitchell Baumann (1)
No scoring		Second period	No scoring
Darian Romanko (3) - sh - 10:29; Darian Romanko (4) - pp - 16:01		Third period	No scoring
Brock Kautz (27 saves / 28 shots)		Goalie stats	Patrick Munson (23 saves / 25 shots)

April 25	Minnesota Wilderness	4 – 2	Fairbanks Ice Dogs	Northwoods Credit Union Arena
Dan Litchke (6) - 17:51		First period	3:22 - Jacob Hetz (4)
Niklas Lehtimäki (4) - 16:22		Second period	5:35 - Jacob Hetz (5)
Brett Heikkila (2) - 4:37; Ian Mansfield (3) - en - 19:57		Third period	No scoring
Brock Kautz (21 saves / 23 shots)		Goalie stats	Patrick Munson (31 saves / 34 shots)

May 1	Fairbanks Ice Dogs	3 – 6	Minnesota Wilderness	Big Dipper Ice Arena
Hans Gorowsky (2) - 15:11; Jacob Hetz (6) - 15:49; Tyler Tomberlin (1) - ps - 16:47		First period	No scoring
No scoring		Second period	7:54 - pp - Michael Covach (4); 8:48 - pp - Tyler Cline (4); 14:07 - sh - Dan Litchke (7)
No scoring		Third period	14:00 - Darian Romanko (5); 18:50 - en - Darian Romanko (6); 18:54 - en - Ian Mansfield (4)
Patrick Munson (23 saves / 27 shots)		Goalie stats	Brock Kautz (28 saves / 31 shots)

Minnesota wins series 3 – 0

=== North Division ===
==== (N1) Janesville Jets vs. (N3) Soo Eagles ====
April 24	Janesville Jets	5 – 0	Soo Eagles	Janesville Ice Arena
2:42 - Kevin Dineen (1); 13:04 - Drew Callin (2); 15:34 - Nils Rygaard (1)		First period	No scoring
No scoring		Second period	No scoring
10:22 - pp - Drew Callin (3); 17:30 - Brandon Schultz (5)		Third period	No scoring
Matt Jurusik (23 saves / 23 shots)		Goalie stats	Chad Catt (28 saves / 33 shots)

April 25	Janesville Jets	5 – 1	Soo Eagles	Janesville Ice Arena
8:19 - Nils Rygaard (2); 11:17 - pp - Drew Callin (4)		First period	No scoring
4:24 - pp - Daniel Kucerovy (3); 10:47 - sh - Mitchell Fossier (1); 12:26 - Jeff Alderfer (1)		Second period	Raymond Brice (2) - 15:08
No scoring		Third period	No scoring
Matt Jurusik (25 saves / 26 shots)		Goalie stats	Chad Catt (14 saves / 18 shots); Jack Berry (14 saves / 15 shots)

May 1	Soo Eagles	4 – 0	Janesville Jets	Pullar Stadium
6:35 - Trevor Cope (3); 12:59 - Trevor Cope (4)		First period	No scoring
4:38 - Leo Lumm (2)		Second period	No scoring
16:08 - sh - en - Denver Pierce (1)		Third period	No scoring
Jack Berry (36 saves / 36 shots)		Goalie stats	Matt Jurusik (27 saves / 30 shots)

May 2	Soo Eagles	2 – 6	Janesville Jets	Pullar Stadium
No scoring		First period	Nils Rygaard (3) - 4:51; Daniel Kucerovy (4) - pp - 7:49
11:05 - Patrick Gazzillo (1); 19:47 - pp - Bradley Pung (2)		Second period	Nils Rygaard (4) - 4:23; Alex Smith (1) - 16:59
No scoring		Third period	Grant Hutton (2) - 3:06; Daniel Kucerovy (5) - 15:26
Jack Berry (24 saves / 29 shots); Chad Catt (7 saves / 8 shots)		Goalie stats	Matt Jurusik (16 saves / 18 shots)

Janesville wins series 3 – 1

=== South Division ===
==== (S1) Lone Star Brahmas vs. (S2) Topeka RoadRunners ====
April 24	Lone Star Brahmas	1 – 5	Topeka RoadRunners	NYTEX Sports Centre
4:15 - Sebastian Vidmar (1)		First period	No scoring
No scoring		Second period	Mike Gornall (1) - 0:27; Tyler Irvine (2) - 8:36
No scoring		Third period	Dominic Lutz (2) - 2:06; Jasen Fernsler (1) - en - 17:08; Mike Gornall (2) - pp - 17:53
Jake Kupsky (17 saves / 21 shots)		Goalie stats	Matej Tomek (21 saves / 22 shots)

April 25	Lone Star Brahmas	5 – 4	OT	Topeka RoadRunners	NYTEX Sports Centre
5:37 - Cody Wickline (2); 10:54 - Liam Stirtzinger (1)		First period		No scoring
9:21 - Roman Uchyn (2); 10:02 - Cody Wickline (3)		Second period		Mike Gornall (2) - pp - 17:25; Mike Gornall (3) - 17:50
No scoring		Third period		Mike Gornall (4) - 9:28; Carlos Fornaris (2) - 19:39
3:53 - Storm Wahlrab (1)		First overtime period		No scoring
T.J. Black (17 saves / 21 shots)		Goalie stats		Matej Tomek (10 saves / 14 shots); Drew Vogler (7 saves / 8 shots)

May 1	Topeka RoadRunners	2 – 3	Lone Star Brahmas	Kansas Expocentre

May 2	Topeka RoadRunners	2 – 3	Lone Star Brahmas	Kansas Expocentre

Lone Star wins series 3 – 1

== Semifinals ==
=== (N1) Janesville Jets vs. (MW2) Minnesota Wilderness ===
May 8	Janesville Jets	1 – 2	Minnesota Wilderness	Riverside Arena

May 9	Janesville Jets	1 – 2	OT	Minnesota Wilderness	Riverside Arena

Minnesota wins series 2 – 0

=== (S1) Lone Star Brahmas vs. (MW2) Austin Bruins ===
May 8	Lone Star Brahmas	1 – 3	Austin Bruins	Riverside Arena

May 9	Lone Star Brahmas	3 – 1	Austin Bruins	Riverside Arena

May 10	Lone Star Brahmas	2 – 3	OT	Austin Bruins	Riverside Arena

Austin wins series 2 – 1

== Robertson Cup Finals ==
=== (C1) Austin Bruins vs. (MW2) Minnesota Wilderness ===
May 15	Austin Bruins	1 – 2	4OT	Minnesota Wilderness	Riverside Arena

May 16	Austin Bruins	0 – 4	Minnesota Wilderness	Riverside Arena

Minnesota wins series 2 – 0
