= Kristofers Bindulis =

Latvian ice hockey player

- Born: 18 September 1995 (age 30) Riga, Latvia
- Height: 6 ft 3 in (191 cm)
- Weight: 192 lb (87 kg; 13 st 10 lb)
- Position: Defence
- Shoots: Left
- Slovak team Former teams: HK Dukla Michalovce; Hershey Bears; Krefeld Pinguine; Motor České Budějovice
- National team: Latvia
- NHL draft: Undrafted
- Playing career: 2017–present

Kristofers Bindulis (born September 17, 1995) is a Latvian professional ice hockey player who is a defenceman for HK Dukla Michalovce of the Slovak Extraliga.

== Playing career ==
Bindulis first played two seasons in his native Latvia from 2011 to 2013 before opting to develop his game in the United States further. He first played in the North American Hockey League with the Soo Eagles in 2013–14 before splitting the following year between the Eagles and the Des Moines Buccaneers of the United States Hockey League.

In the 2016–17 season, he was recruited to play collegiate hockey with Lake Superior State University of the Western Collegiate Hockey Association. As a freshman, he contributed with 1 goal and 12 points in 28 games before opting to conclude his collegiate career by signing a three-year entry-level contract with the Washington Capitals on March 8, 2017.

Bindulis split the tenure of his entry-level contract between the Capitals' affiliate, the Hershey Bears of the American Hockey League (AHL), and the South Carolina Stingrays of the ECHL. After his three-year deal, Bindulis left North America as a restricted free agent from the Capitals and signed a one-year contract with German club Krefeld Pinguine of the DEL on 5 August 2020.

== International play ==
Bindulis played in two junior tournament with the Latvian national junior team at the 2013 World Under-18 Championships and the Division I 2015 World Junior Championships.

He was later selected and made his senior debut for Latvia at the 2017 IIHF World Championship, appearing in 5 games.

== Career statistics ==
=== Regular season and playoffs ===
			Regular season					Playoffs
Season	Team	League	GP	G	A	Pts	PIM	GP	G	A	Pts	PIM
2011–12	SK Riga 17	LHL	35	2	11	13	16	3	0	0	0	0
2012–13	HK Juniors Riga	LHL	17	2	6	8	20	—	—	—	—	—
2012–13	HK Juniors Riga	MHL-B	34	4	6	10	62	3	0	0	0	2
2013–14	Soo Eagles	NAHL	52	0	11	11	64	—	—	—	—	—
2014–15	Soo Eagles	NAHL	28	1	5	6	29	—	—	—	—	—
2014–15	Des Moines Buccaneers	USHL	30	1	1	2	6	—	—	—	—	—
2015–16	Aston Rebels	NAHL	57	10	36	46	75	8	3	2	5	4
2016–17	Lake Superior State University	WCHA	28	1	11	12	20	—	—	—	—	—
2017–18	Hershey Bears	AHL	12	0	1	1	6	—	—	—	—	—
2017–18	South Carolina Stingrays	ECHL	34	4	11	15	10	—	—	—	—	—
2018–19	Hershey Bears	AHL	4	0	0	0	2	—	—	—	—	—
2019–20	South Carolina Stingrays	ECHL	50	6	17	23	20	—	—	—	—	—
2020–21	Krefeld Pinguine	DEL	35	2	1	3	12	—	—	—	—	—
2021–22	Motor České Budějovice	ELH	49	2	3	5	16	1	0	0	0	2
AHL totals			16	0	1	1	8	—	—	—	—	—

=== International ===
Year	Team	Event	Result	GP	G	A	Pts	PIM
2013	Latvia	WJC18	10th	6	0	0	0	6
2015	Latvia	WJC-D1	15th	5	0	0	0	27
2017	Latvia	WC	10th	5	0	0	0	0
2026	Latvia	WC	6th	4	0	0	0	0
Junior totals				11	0	0	0	33
Senior totals				9	0	0	0	0
