= Patrik Demel =

Czech ice hockey player

- Born: 28 November 1995 (age 30) Ostrava, Czech Republic
- Height: 5 ft 11 in (180 cm)
- Weight: 181 lb (82 kg; 12 st 13 lb)
- Position: Defenseman
- Shoots: Left
- Czech Extraliga team: HC Vítkovice Ridera
- Played for: American International
- National team: Czech Republic

Patrik Demel (born 28 November 1995) is a Czech professional ice hockey defenceman currently playing for HC Vítkovice Ridera.

== Playing career ==
Demel played for a variety of junior teams in the Czech Republic, but spent most of his time in the HC RT Torax Poruba system. He played well enough to make the Czech national junior team, appearing in three games for the squad during the 2015 season. The next year, Demel travelled to North America and spent his final year of junior eligibility playing for the Bismarck Bobcats. He helped the team win a division title and make the second round of the playoffs.

The following year, Demel began attending American International, a program that hadn't had a winning season in 22 years. He saw limited playing time in his first two seasons with the club but, just as the program was beginning to turn around, Demel became a major contributor for the team. As a junior he played in all 41 games and helped the Yellow Jackets win their first regular season title in program history. The very same year the team also won its first conference championship in 29 years and appear in its first ever NCAA tournament game. The Yellow Jackets played the top overall seed in the tournament but managed to win their first tournament game regardless. For an encore, Demel increased his scoring output and helped AIC repeat as regular season champions. The team was expected to make its second NCAA tournament, however, the COVID-19 pandemic caused the season to end prematurely.

Despite the unfortunate end to his collegiate career, Demel had made enough of an impact to be signed to a professional deal by HC Litvínov. As of 2022, he has spent his entire professional career with the club and was named an alternate captain for the 2022–23 season.

== Career statistics ==
=== Regular season and playoffs ===
			Regular season					Playoffs
Season	Team	League	GP	G	A	Pts	PIM	GP	G	A	Pts	PIM
2015–16	Bismarck Bobcats	NAHL	56	2	30	32	8	11	2	6	8	2
2016–17	American International	Atlantic Hockey	14	4	5	9	2	—	—	—	—	—
2017–18	American International	Atlantic Hockey	21	3	5	8	10	—	—	—	—	—
2018–19	American International	Atlantic Hockey	41	1	16	17	10	—	—	—	—	—
2019–20	American International	Atlantic Hockey	34	2	19	21	10	—	—	—	—	—
2020–21	HC Litvínov	Czech	50	0	11	11	16	3	0	0	0	2
2021–22	HC Litvínov	Czech	56	4	14	18	30	—	—	—	—	—
NCAA totals			110	10	45	55	32	—	—	—	—	—
Czech totals			106	4	25	29	46	3	0	0	0	2

=== International ===
Year	Team	Event	Result	GP	G	A	Pts	PIM
2014–15	Czech U20	International	-	3	0	0	0	8
2021–22	Czech	International	-	1	0	0	0	0

== Awards and honors ==
Award	Year
All-Atlantic Hockey Second Team	2019–20
