= Adrián Holešinský =

Slovak ice hockey player

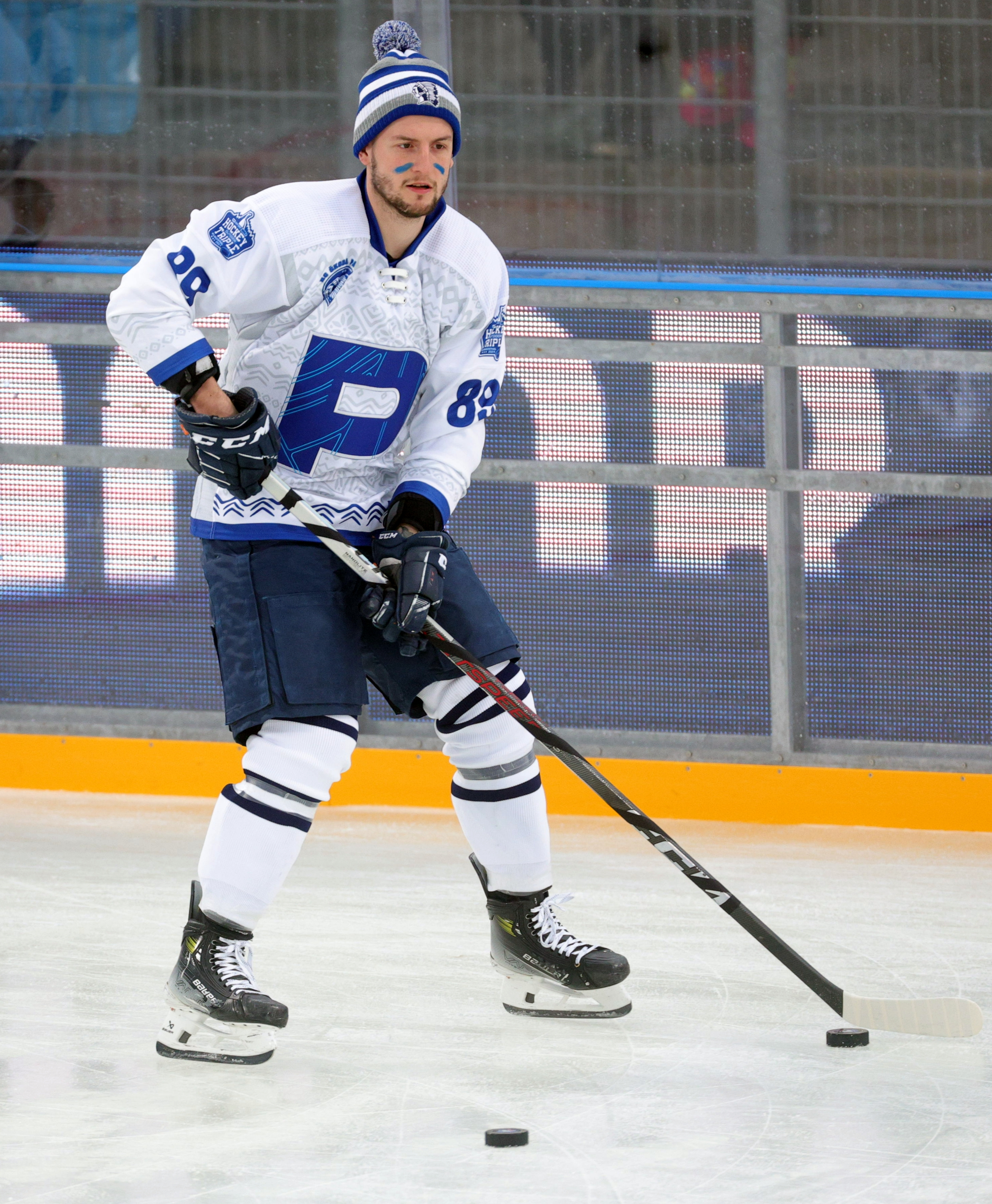
- Holešinský with HC Škoda Plzeň in 2024
- Born: 11 February 1996 (age 30) Čadca, Slovakia
- Height: 6 ft 0 in (183 cm)
- Weight: 190 lb (86 kg; 13 st 8 lb)
- Position: Forward
- Shoots: Left
- ELH team Former teams: Motor České Budějovice; MsHK Žilina; HK Orange 20; HK Nitra; HC Plzeň
- National team: Slovakia
- NHL draft: Undrafted
- Playing career: 2014–present

Adrián Holešinský (born 11 February 1996) is a Slovak professional ice hockey forward for Motor České Budějovice of the Czech Extraliga (ELH).

== Playing career ==
Holešinský first played as a youth and professionally in Slovakia with MsHK Žilina of the Slovak Extraliga, before opting to continue his development in North America.

After a collegiate career with the University of Maine in the Hockey East, Holešinský returned to Slovakia as an undrafted free agent and was signed to a contract with HK Nitra.

During the 2025-26 season, his fourth in the Czech Extraliga with HC Škoda Plzeň, Holešinský registered just 4 goals and 16 points through 41 appearances before leaving to club in a trade to join fellow ELH outfit, Motor České Budějovice, on 2 February 2026.

== International play ==
Medal record

Representing Slovakia

Ice hockey

Olympic Games
Bronze medal – third place	2022 Beijing	

Holešinský was selected to make his full IIHF international debut, participating for Slovakia in the 2021 IIHF World Championship.

== Career statistics ==
=== Regular season and playoffs ===
			Regular season					Playoffs
Season	Team	League	GP	G	A	Pts	PIM	GP	G	A	Pts	PIM
2010–11	MsHK DOXXbet Žilina	SVK U18	1	0	0	0	0	—	—	—	—	—
2010–11	MsHK DOXXbet Žilina	SVK.2 U18	16	7	6	13	39	—	—	—	—	—
2011–12	MsHK DOXXbet Žilina	SVK U18	43	22	34	56	62	—	—	—	—	—
2012–13	VIK Västerås HK	J18	21	7	9	16	24	—	—	—	—	—
2012–13	VIK Västerås HK	J18 Allsv	14	3	9	12	12	—	—	—	—	—
2013–14	VIK Västerås HK	J18	16	11	7	18	10	—	—	—	—	—
2013–14	VIK Västerås HK	J18 Allsv	15	7	7	14	47	5	2	0	2	4
2013–14	VIK Västerås HK	J20	8	0	1	1	24	—	—	—	—	—
2014–15	Jokipojat	FIN U20	23	0	4	4	22	—	—	—	—	—
2014–15	MsHK DOXXbet Žilina	SVK U20	6	2	4	6	6	8	8	2	10	6
2014–15	MsHK DOXXbet Žilina	SVK	1	0	0	0	0	—	—	—	—	—
2014–15	HKM Zvolen	SVK U20	2	2	1	3	0	—	—	—	—	—
2015–16	HK Orange 20	SVK	15	0	1	1	6	—	—	—	—	—
2015–16	HK Orange 20	SVK.2	9	2	2	4	14	—	—	—	—	—
2015–16	MsHK DOXXbet Žilina	SVK U20	6	4	14	18	29	—	—	—	—	—
2015–16	Janesville Jets	NAHL	26	9	21	30	36	4	2	3	5	4
2016–17	Janesville Jets	NAHL	30	11	25	36	35	—	—	—	—	—
2017–18	University of Maine	HE	8	0	0	0	8	—	—	—	—	—
2018–19	University of Maine	HE	7	0	0	0	2	—	—	—	—	—
2019–20	University of Maine	HE	2	0	0	0	2	—	—	—	—	—
2020–21	HK Nitra	SVK	39	13	11	24	56	5	1	1	2	14
2021–22	HK Nitra	SVK	37	15	24	39	30	19	1	11	12	47
2022–23	HK Nitra	SVK	13	5	6	11	10	—	—	—	—	—
2022–23	HC Plzeň	ELH	33	10	17	27	35	5	2	2	4	10
2023–24	HC Plzeň	ELH	46	12	22	34	23	3	0	0	0	6
2024–25	HC Plzeň	ELH	34	1	10	11	42	—	—	—	—	—
2025–26	HC Plzeň	ELH	41	4	12	16	39	—	—	—	—	—
Slovak totals			105	33	42	75	102	24	2	12	14	61
ELH totals			154	27	61	88	139	8	2	2	4	16

=== International ===
Year	Team	Event	Result	GP	G	A	Pts	PIM
2013	Slovakia	U17	10th	5	2	0	2	4
2013	Slovakia	IH18	8th	4	1	1	2	25
2021	Slovakia	WC	8th	3	0	1	1	2
2022	Slovakia	OG	3rd place, bronze medalist(s)	2	0	0	0	0
Junior totals				9	3	1	3	29
Senior totals				5	0	1	1	2
