= Grant Hutton =

American ice hockey player (born 1995)

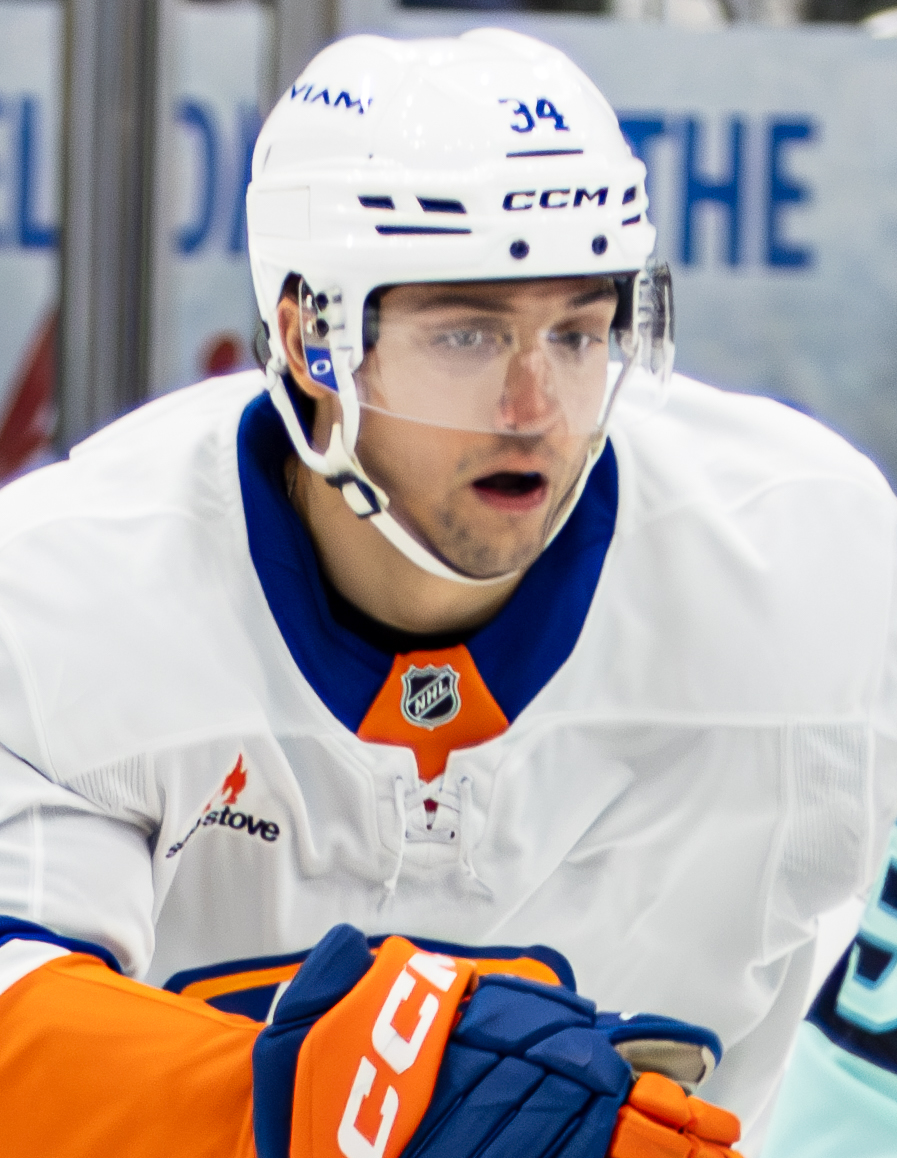
- Hutton with the New York Islanders in 2024
- Born: July 25, 1995 (age 31) Carmel, Indiana, U.S.
- Height: 6 ft 3 in (191 cm)
- Weight: 210 lb (95 kg; 15 st 0 lb)
- Position: Defence
- Shot: Right
- Played for: New York Islanders; Bridgeport Sound Tigers; Bridgeport Islanders
- NHL draft: Undrafted
- Playing career: 2019–2025

Grant Hutton (born July 25, 1995) is an American former professional ice hockey defenseman. He most recently played for the Bridgeport Islanders of the American Hockey League (AHL) as a prospect for the New York Islanders of the National Hockey League (NHL). Hutton signed an entry-level contract with the Islanders in March 2019 after playing four years in the NCAA with the Miami RedHawks. He played in his first NHL game on November 20, 2021.

== Playing career ==
Growing up in Carmel, Indiana, Hutton played youth hockey for the Indiana Junior Ice U16 team. In his second season with the team, Hutton tallied four goals and 14 assists through 18 games. Following this, he was selected by the Indiana Ice in the 2012 USHL Entry Draft and he subsequently split his time between the USHL and Corpus Christi IceRays and Janesville Jets of the NAHL. Hutton served as an alternate captain for the Ice Rays in the 2013–14 season, where he also tallied 6 goals and 13 assists through 43 games. Throughout his time in the USHL, Hutton also played for the Tri-City Storm and Des Moines Buccaneers.

=== Collegiate ===
Hutton played for the Miami RedHawks at Miami University from 2015 to 2019. There, he enrolled in the Farmer School of Business and majored in marketing. Upon joining the team for the 2015–16 season, Hutton scored his first NCAA assist in a 7–3 win over the Providence Friars. In February, he was awarded the NCHC Defenseman of the Week accolade after tallying two assists for his first-career multi-point game in a 4–1 win over the Bowling Green Falcons. He finished the season with five assists and no goals through 35 games.

Upon returning to the RedHawks for his sophomore season, Hutton broke out offensively and led all defencemen with nine goals and nine assists for 18 points. He also matched a program record for most goals by a defenseman since Alec Martinez in 2007–08. He began the season by tallying his first career collegiate goal on October 7, 2016, against the Providence Friars. Following this, he endured a three-game goal streak from February 18 to 24 as well as a four-game point streak. The next week, he was selected for another Defenseman of the Week honor after scoring two goals. Hutton finished the 2016–17 season by being elected to the NCHC Academic All-Conference Team.

During his junior season, Hutton was one of nine upperclassmen on the team and was subsequently given a leadership position. He began the season strong and was named NCHC Defenseman of the Week after tallying four goals and one assist in a series against the Maine Black Bears. As an assistant captain, he played with a defensive partner Louie Belpedio and they combined to score over 25 percent of the RedHawks goals by December 2017. As the season continued, Hutton notched six multi-point games and tallied 10 goals to become the first ReedHawks defenseman to do so since Dan Boyle in 1997–98. He finished the season with a career-high 13 goals and 14 assists for 27 points through 36 games.

Hutton returned to Miami University for the 2018–19 season as team captain. In this role, he led all RedHawks defensemen with seven goals and 14 assists through 37 games. By January 2019, Hutton's 25 goals were tied for the fifth-most all-time among Miami defensemen.

=== Professional ===
Hutton officially concluded his collegiate career on March 21, 2019, by signing a one-year, entry-level contract with the New York Islanders. He was immediately assigned to the Islanders American Hockey League (AHL) affiliate, the Bridgeport Sound Tigers, and made his professional debut on March 27. A few days later, he recorded his first career professional assist in a loss to the Wilkes-Barre/Scranton Penguins. Hutton accumulated four points through six games to help lead the Sound Tigers to the 2019 Calder Cup playoffs for the first time since 2016.

As a result of COVID-19 ravaging the Islanders lineup, Hutton earned his first NHL recall on November 20, 2021. At the time of the recall, Hutton had tallied two goals through 10 games. He subsequently made his NHL debut that night in a 5–2 loss to the Calgary Flames. During the game, he recorded three blocked shots and played 13:43 minutes of ice time.

Grant Hutton's first NHL goal came on April 9, 2022, in St Louis against the Blues.

== Personal life ==
Hutton was born on July 25, 1995, in Carmel, Indiana, to parents G.R. and Tracy Hutton. His father spent the 1989–90 season playing with the Omaha Lancers of the United States Hockey League (USHL). His younger brother Matthew also plays ice hockey and in 2017, was a Forward with the Odessa Jackalopes of the North American Hockey League (NAHL).

== Career statistics ==
			Regular season					Playoffs
Season	Team	League	GP	G	A	Pts	PIM	GP	G	A	Pts	PIM
2012–13	Indiana Ice	USHL	4	0	0	0	2	—	—	—	—	—
2012–13	Corpus Christi IceRays	NAHL	42	4	6	10	53	4	0	1	1	10
2013–14	Corpus Christi IceRays	NAHL	43	6	13	19	52	—	—	—	—	—
2013–14	Tri-City Storm	USHL	20	1	1	2	7	—	—	—	—	—
2014–15	Des Moines Buccaneers	USHL	11	0	0	0	2	—	—	—	—	—
2014–15	Janesville Jets	NAHL	32	4	10	14	18	9	3	4	7	14
2015–16	Miami University (Ohio)	NCHC	35	0	5	5	6	—	—	—	—	—
2016–17	Miami University (Ohio)	NCHC	36	9	9	18	34	—	—	—	—	—
2017–18	Miami University (Ohio)	NCHC	36	13	14	27	45	—	—	—	—	—
2018–19	Miami University (Ohio)	NCHC	37	7	14	21	29	—	—	—	—	—
2018–19	Bridgeport Sound Tigers	AHL	9	1	5	6	2	5	0	0	0	0
2019–20	Bridgeport Sound Tigers	AHL	55	6	15	21	31	—	—	—	—	—
2020–21	Bridgeport Sound Tigers	AHL	24	0	5	5	16	—	—	—	—	—
2021–22	Bridgeport Islanders	AHL	46	9	11	20	12	6	1	0	1	0
2021–22	New York Islanders	NHL	16	1	0	1	4	—	—	—	—	—
2022–23	Bridgeport Islanders	AHL	39	4	6	10	16	—	—	—	—	—
2023–24	Bridgeport Islanders	AHL	54	2	14	16	30	—	—	—	—	—
2023–24	New York Islanders	NHL	2	0	0	0	0	—	—	—	—	—
2024–25	Bridgeport Islanders	AHL	29	0	5	5	31	—	—	—	—	—
2024–25	New York Islanders	NHL	13	0	2	2	4	—	—	—	—	—
NHL totals			31	1	2	3	8	—	—	—	—	—
