= Josh Wilkins =

American ice hockey player (born 1997)

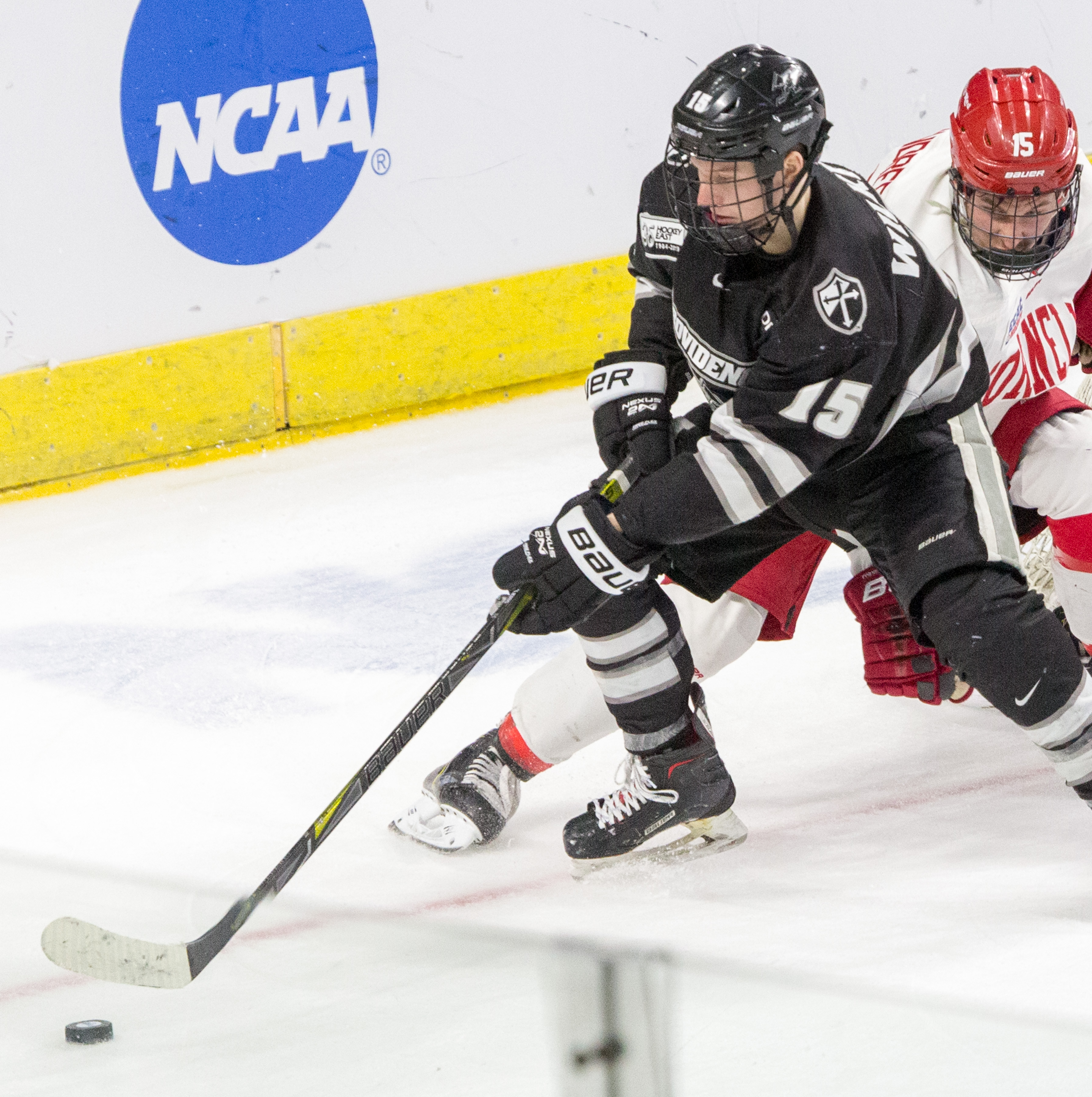
- Wilkins with Providence College in 2019
- Born: June 11, 1997 (age 29) Raleigh, North Carolina, U.S.
- Height: 6 ft 0 in (183 cm)
- Weight: 194 lb (88 kg; 13 st 12 lb)
- Position: Center
- Shoots: Left
- ECHL team Former teams: South Carolina Stingrays; Milwaukee Admirals; Tucson Roadrunners; Västerviks IK; HC Vita Hästen; HK Dukla Michalovce
- NHL draft: Undrafted
- Playing career: 2019–present

Josh Wilkins (born June 11, 1997) is an American professional ice hockey center for South Carolina Stingrays of the ECHL. He was an All-American for Providence.

== Playing career ==
Wilkins began his college career in 2016 with Providence. Straight away he began providing a good deal of scoring, finishing third on the team as a freshman. He held steady in his sophomore season but improved his performance in the postseason, scoring two game-winning goals in the Friars run to the Hockey East championship game. As a junior, Wilkins became one of the top scorers in the nation, finishing in the top 10. Wilkins then helped Providence reach the Frozen Four by scoring 4 goals in three postseason games.

After his third season, Wilkins signed a two-year entry-level contract with the Nashville Predators. Wilkins had a hard time finding his scoring touch as a professional, netting just 3 goals in his first full season. Due to the COVID-19 pandemic he was limited to just 30 games the following season. Though his performance did improve slightly, it wasn't enough to earn him an extension and he headed to Sweden in 2021.

Following two seasons in the Swedish HockeyAllsvenskan, Wilkins returned to North America for the 2022–23 season, signing a contract with the South Carolina Stingrays of the ECHL on June 21, 2022.

While a forward with the South Carolina Stingrays, he led the team in assists and points. He had 62 points in 62 games.

== Career statistics ==
			Regular season					Playoffs
Season	Team	League	GP	G	A	Pts	PIM	GP	G	A	Pts	PIM
2014–15	Austin Bruins	NAHL	54	11	16	27	20	13	3	3	6	6
2015–16	Sioux City Musketeers	USHL	49	16	13	29	39	—	—	—	—	—
2016–17	Providence College	HE	39	13	18	31	10	—	—	—	—	—
2017–18	Providence College	HE	40	15	16	31	19	—	—	—	—	—
2018–19	Providence College	HE	40	20	26	46	10	—	—	—	—	—
2019–20	Milwaukee Admirals	AHL	56	3	12	15	22	—	—	—	—	—
2020–21	Florida Everblades	ECHL	5	0	1	1	7	—	—	—	—	—
2020–21	Tucson Roadrunners	AHL	25	3	2	5	0	—	—	—	—	—
2021–22	Västerviks IK	Allsv	18	2	3	5	6	—	—	—	—	—
2021–22	HC Vita Hästen	Allsv	29	7	8	15	4	—	—	—	—	—
2022–23	South Carolina Stingrays	ECHL	62	21	41	62	29	5	1	2	3	15
2023–24	South Carolina Stingrays	ECHL	37	20	17	37	6	—	—	—	—	—
2023–24	HK Dukla Michalovce	Slovak	9	5	2	7	6	11	3	3	6	6
AHL totals			81	6	14	20	22	—	—	—	—	—
Allsv totals			47	9	11	20	10	—	—	—	—	—

== Personal life ==
He resides in Charleston, South Carolina with his finance, Madeline Nelson. The two also have an American Leopard Hound, Bubba Gump Wilkins.

== Awards and honors ==
Award	Year
All-Hockey East First Team	2018–19
AHCA East Second Team All-American	2018–19
