= Parker Mackay =

Canadian ice hockey player (born 1994)

- Born: June 10, 1994 (age 32) Irma, Alberta, Canada
- Height: 5 ft 11 in (180 cm)
- Weight: 185 lb (84 kg; 13 st 3 lb)
- Position: Right wing
- Shot: Right
- Played for: Texas Stars; Graz99ers
- Playing career: 2015–2021

Parker Mackay is a Canadian former ice hockey right wing. He was named as the NCAA Tournament Most Outstanding Player for Minnesota Duluth during the program's national championship in 2019.

== Career ==
Mackay was a key contributor for his junior team, the Spruce Grove Saints, and helped them capture back-to-back AJHL championships. After captaining the team in his final year of junior hockey, Mackay began attending the University of Minnesota Duluth and began his college career as a depth player. As a sophomore, Mackay doubled his scoring production and helped the Bulldogs march all the way to the NCAA championship game. As a reward for his leadership and defensive play, Mackay was named as an alternate captain for his junior season and responded by increasing his point total once more. While Mackay was improving, however, Duluth didn't have nearly as good of a season in 2018. Fortunately for the Bulldogs, their record was still good enough to get them into the NCAA Tournament for the fourth consecutive season. Despite playing in his 7th postseason game, Mackay finally recorded his first point in NCAA Tournament play in the opening match when he scored the game-winning goal against Minnesota State, completing the team's comeback from a 0–2 deficit. Mackay only recorded one more assist in the tournament but his steady defensive play helped the Bulldogs win three consecutive 2–1 decisions en route to a national championship.

Mackay returned for his senior season and was named team captain. He responded with his best offensive season by far, leading the team in goals and points. The Bulldogs were once more a defensive juggernaut and earned the second overall seed for the NCAA Tournament. Despite high hopes, however, the team found itself down 0–1 with less than five minutes to play in their opening match. Mackay took it upon himself to fix things and not only scored the tying goal but netted the game-winner in overtime as well. Duluth relaxed after the near-disaster and won their next two games comfortably, sending them to their third consecutive championship game. Mackay again led the way, scoring the opening goal less than 4 minutes into the contest and added an assist on the insurance marker. Minnesota Duluth won the game 3–0 and Mackay was named as the Tournament MOP. In addition to the honor, Mackay also finished his college career with 14 NCAA tournament games to his credit, more than any other player.

After graduating, Mackay played the following season with the Texas Stars but it was mostly forgettable stint. Due in part to the COVID-19 pandemic, Mackay travelled to Europe for his second season of professional hockey and had a bit of a resurgence with the Graz99ers. In December, however, Mackay announced his retirement as a player citing health reasons.

== Career statistics ==
=== Regular season and playoffs ===
			Regular season					Playoffs
Season	Team	League	GP	G	A	Pts	PIM	GP	G	A	Pts	PIM
2007–08	Wainwright Polar Kings U15 AA	AMBHL AA	26	9	11	20	28	—	—	—	—	—
2008–09	Wainwright Polar Kings U15 AA	AMBHL AA	16	20	19	39	23	—	—	—	—	—
2009–10	Lloydminster Bobcats U16 AAA	AMMHL	31	15	25	40	18	—	—	—	—	—
2010–11	Lloydminster Bobcats U18 AAA	AMHL	29	8	13	21	24	2	0	1	1	0
2011–12	Lloydminster Bobcats U18 AAA	AMHL	24	7	25	32	24	3	2	5	7	-
2012–13	Spruce Grove Saints	AJHL	43	8	10	18	45	16	2	1	3	6
2013–14	Spruce Grove Saints	AJHL	57	21	37	58	105	18	7	4	11	20
2014–15	Spruce Grove Saints	AJHL	44	16	27	43	61	18	12	10	22	10
2015–16	Minnesota Duluth	NCHC	29	4	2	6	6	—	—	—	—	—
2016–17	Minnesota Duluth	NCHC	32	8	4	12	4	—	—	—	—	—
2017–18	Minnesota Duluth	NCHC	35	9	10	19	6	—	—	—	—	—
2018–19	Minnesota Duluth	NCHC	40	16	17	33	14	—	—	—	—	—
2019–20	Texas Stars	AHL	28	2	0	2	6	—	—	—	—	—
2020–21	Graz99ers	ICEHL	19	3	11	14	7	—	—	—	—	—
AMHL totals			53	15	38	53	48	5	2	6	8	0
AJHL totals			144	45	74	119	211	52	21	15	36	36
NCAA totals			136	37	33	70	30	—	—	—	—	—

== Awards and honors ==
Award	Year
NCAA All-Tournament Team	2019

Awards and achievements
Preceded by Karson Kuhlman	NCAA Tournament Most Outstanding Player; 2019	Succeeded by Bobby Trivigno
