= Braemar Ice Rink =

Ice skating rink

- Interactive map of Braemar Ice Rink
- Address: 7501 Ikola Way; Edina, Minnesota; United States
- Coordinates: 44°52′05.3″N 93°23′41.9″W

Construction
- Opened: March 11, 1965

Website
- https://www.edinamn.gov/2157/Braemar-Arena-Field

Braemar Ice Rink, better known as Braemar Arena, is a multisheet (three sheets) ice hockey rink located in Edina, Minnesota, United States. The complex has three rinks named for their relative location on the complex, from oldest to newest: West, East and South. Braemar is home to the Edina High School boys' (14-time state champions), and girls' (5-time state champions) hockey teams, as well as a number of figure skating and City of Edina hockey leagues.

The West rink seats the largest number of people and is used for Varsity games. The East rink is mainly used for figure skating. The South rink was constructed in 1997 and is used for JV games and PeeWee League games.

The West rink of Braemar Arena received a major $3.6 million renovation following the 2011-2012 Minnesota State High School League season. The renovation included the addition of permanent girls' and boys' JV and Varsity locker rooms, a Velocity Hockey training center, and a sporting goods store. The $3.2 million plan which was cleverly named "The Hornet's Nest" received 25% of its funding from private donations.

Braemar is planned to see a $45 million expansion and renovation project starting in the summer of 2026. Plans include reconstructing several rinks, new entrances, and improved ADA compliance.
