= 2019 NCAA Division I men's ice hockey tournament =

- 2019 Frozen Four Logo
- Teams: 16
- Finals site: KeyBank Center, Buffalo, New York
- Champions: Minnesota Duluth Bulldogs (3rd title)
- Runner-up: Massachusetts Minutemen (1st title game)
- Semifinalists: Denver Pioneers (17th Frozen Four); Providence Friars (5th Frozen Four)
- Winning coach: Scott Sandelin (3rd title)
- MOP: Parker Mackay (Minnesota Duluth)
- Attendance: 13,624 (Championship); 39,726 (Frozen Four); 98,807 (Tournament)

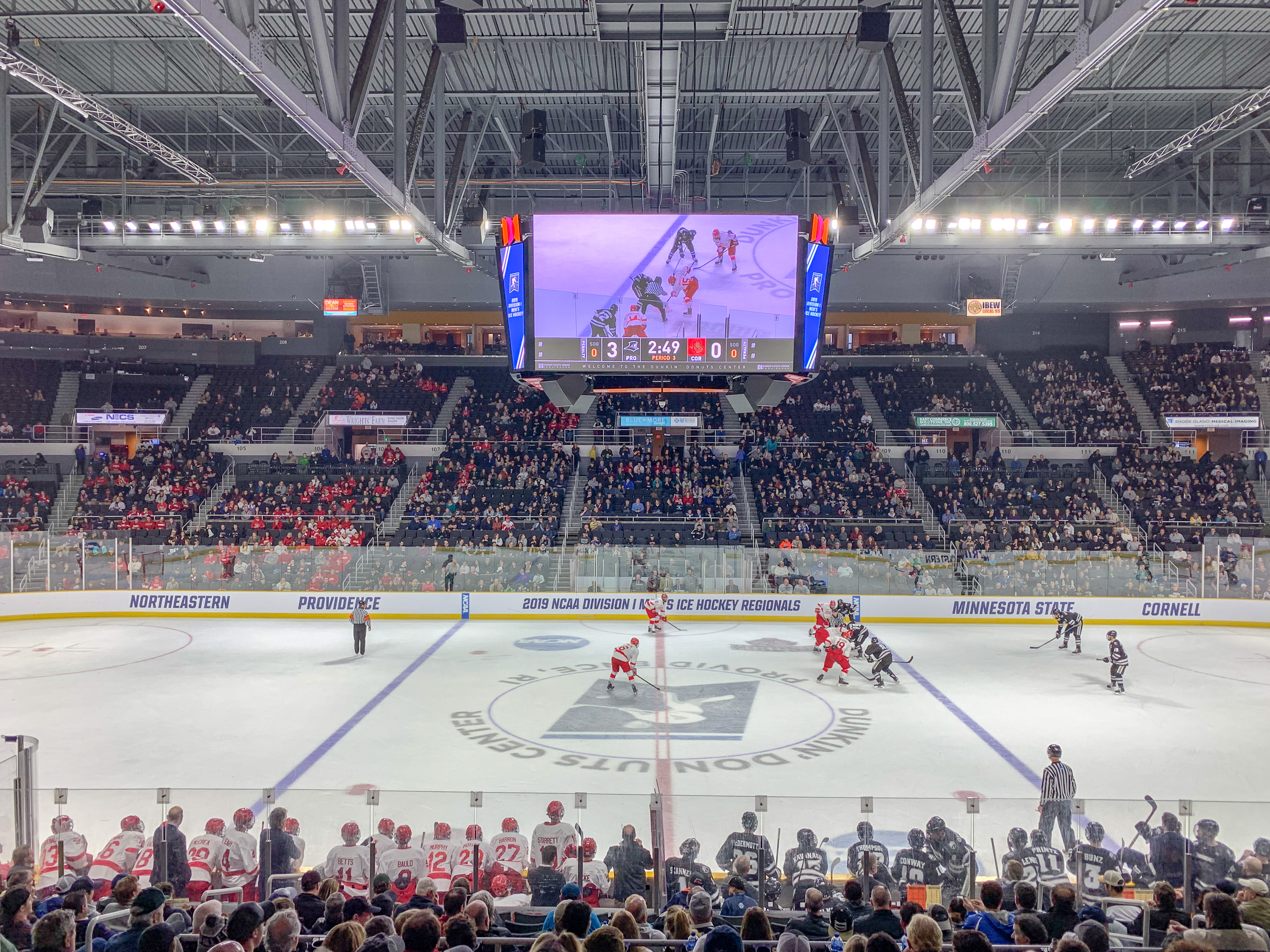
The 2019 East Regionals were played at the Dunkin' Donuts Center in Providence, Rhode Island

The 2019 NCAA Division I men's ice hockey tournament was the national championship tournament for men's college ice hockey in the United States. The tournament involved 16 teams in single-elimination play to determine the national champion at the Division I level of the National Collegiate Athletic Association (NCAA), the highest level of competition in college hockey. The tournament's Frozen Four – the semifinals and finals – were hosted by the MAAC at the KeyBank Center in Buffalo, New York from April 11–13, 2019. This was the second Frozen Four in the city of Buffalo, as it previously hosted in 2003.

This year’s tournament was the first since 2007 to feature multiple programs, AIC and Arizona State, making their first appearance in the NCAA playoffs. Arizona State’s tournament appearance was also the first for an Independent program since 1992.

The tournament is as remembered for the lack of attendance as anything that happened on the ice. All semifinal and championship games had at least 5,000 fewer spectators than the building capacity (19,070) and the title game saw the lowest attendance since 2000. Though there was much discussion on the matter, a general consensus by fan bases was that the ticket prices of $200–$300 were far too high even for a championship game.

== Tournament procedure ==
2019 Regionals (blue) and Frozen Four (red)

The tournament is composed of four groups of four teams in regional brackets. The four regionals are officially named after their geographic areas. The following are the sites for the 2019 regionals:

March 29–30
Northeast Regional, SNHU Arena – Manchester, New Hampshire (Host: New Hampshire)
West Regional, Scheels Arena – Fargo, North Dakota (Host: North Dakota)
March 30–31
East Regional, Dunkin' Donuts Center – Providence, Rhode Island (Host: Brown)
Midwest Regional, PPL Center – Allentown, Pennsylvania (Host: Penn State)

The winner of each regional will advance to the Frozen Four:

April 11/13
KeyBank Center – Buffalo, New York (Host: MAAC)

== Qualifying teams ==
The at-large bids and seeding for each team in the tournament were announced on March 24. Teams were seeded according to their PairWise rankings (PWR) 1 thru 16 then matchups were adjusted to prevent teams from the same conference meeting in the first round. After the four groups were decided they were placed in regions as close, geographically, to the top seed as possible. The ECAC Hockey had four teams receive a berth in the tournament, the NCHC and Hockey East each had three teams receive a berth, the WCHA and Big Ten had two teams receive a berth, while one team from Atlantic Hockey received a berth. For the first time since 1992 an independent program, Arizona State, also received a tournament berth.

| West Regional – Fargo | | | | | | | Midwest Regional – Allentown | | | | | | |
| Seed | School | Conference | Record | Berth type | Appearance | Last bid | Seed | School | Conference | Record | Berth type | Appearance | Last bid |
|---|---|---|---|---|---|---|---|---|---|---|---|---|---|
| 1 | St. Cloud State (1) | NCHC | 30–5–3 | At Large | 14th | 2018 | 1 | Minnesota–Duluth (2) | NCHC | 25–11–2 | Tournament champion | 13th | 2018 |
| 2 | Denver | NCHC | 22–11–5 | At-Large | 29th | 2018 | 2 | Quinnipiac | ECAC | 25–9–2 | At-Large | 6th | 2016 |
| 3 | Ohio State | Big Ten | 20–10–5 | At-Large | 9th | 2018 | 3 | Arizona State | Independent | 21–12–1 | At-Large | 1st | Never |
| 4 | American International | Atlantic Hockey | 22–16–1 | Tournament champion | 1st | Never | 4 | Bowling Green | WCHA | 25–10–5 | At-Large | 10th | 1990 |
| East Regional – Providence | | | | | | | Northeast Regional – Manchester | | | | | | |
| Seed | School | Conference | Record | Berth type | Appearance | Last bid | Seed | School | Conference | Record | Berth type | Appearance | Last bid |
| 1 | Minnesota State (3) | WCHA | 32–7–2 | Tournament champion | 6th | 2018 | 1 | Massachusetts (4) | Hockey East | 28–9–0 | At-Large | 2nd | 2007 |
| 2 | Northeastern | Hockey East | 27–10–1 | Tournament champion | 7th | 2018 | 2 | Clarkson | ECAC | 26–10–2 | Tournament champion | 22nd | 2018 |
| 3 | Cornell | ECAC | 20–10–4 | At-Large | 22nd | 2018 | 3 | Notre Dame | Big Ten | 22–13–3 | Tournament champion | 11th | 2018 |
| 4 | Providence | Hockey East | 22–11–6 | At-Large | 15th | 2018 | 4 | Harvard | ECAC | 19–10–3 | At-Large | 25th | 2017 |

Number in parentheses denotes overall seed in the tournament.

== Tournament bracket ==
Regional semifinals March 29–30
1 | St. Cloud State (1) | 1
4 | American International | 2
West – Fargo – Fri/Sat
2 | Denver | 2
3 | Ohio State | 0
1 | Massachusetts (4) | 4
4 | Harvard | 0
Northeast – Manchester – Fri/Sat
2 | Clarkson | 2
3 | Notre Dame | 3*
1 | Minnesota–Duluth (2) | 2*
4 | Bowling Green | 1
Midwest – Allentown – Sat/Sun
2 | Quinnipiac | 2
3 | Arizona State | 1
1 | Minnesota State (3) | 3
4 | Providence | 6
East – Providence – Sat/Sun
2 | Northeastern | 1
3 | Cornell | 5

Regional Finals; March 30–31
4 | American International | 0
2 | Denver | 3
1 | Massachusetts (4) | 4
3 | Notre Dame | 0
1 | Minnesota–Duluth (2) | 3
2 | Quinnipiac | 1
4 | Providence | 4
3 | Cornell | 0

Semifinals; April 11
W2 | Denver | 3
NE1 | Massachusetts (4) | 4*
MW1 | Minnesota–Duluth (2) | 4
E4 | Providence | 1

Championship; April 13
NE1 | Massachusetts (4) | 0
MW1 | Minnesota–Duluth (2) | 3

Note: * denotes overtime period

== Results ==
=== West Region – Fargo, North Dakota ===
==== Regional semifinal ====
| March 29, 2019; 6:30 pm | (1) St. Cloud State | 1–2 (0–1, 0–1, 1–0) | (4) American International | Scheels Arena, Fargo, North Dakota; Attendance: 4,220 |

Game reference

Dávid Hrenák
Goalies
Zackarias Skog
Referees:
Dan Kovarik
Josh Lupenek
Linesmen:
Matt Tyree
Kyle Domin

| | 0–1 | 06:01 – Joel Kocur (11) (Stephan) |
| | 0–2 | 27:32 – GW – Brennan Kapcheck (5) (Christensen, Fladeby) |
| Easton Brodzinski (16) (Lizotte, Schuldt) – 43:27 | 1–2 |

4 min
Penalties
8 min
34
Shots
13

| March 29, 2019; 3:00 pm | (2) Denver | 2–0 (0–0, 1–0, 1–0) | (3) Ohio State | Scheels Arena, Fargo, North Dakota; Attendance: 4,220 |

Game reference
| Filip Larsson | Goalies | Tommy Nappier | Referees: Jamie Koharski; Peter Schlittenhart; Linesmen: Tom George; Jeff McCorkle |
| Lester Lancaster (5) (Pettersen, Davies) – GW – 39:20 / 1–0; Colin Staub (6) (Davies) – EN – 59:02 / 2–0 | | | Referees: Jamie Koharski; Peter Schlittenhart; Linesmen: Tom George; Jeff McCorkle |
| 8 min | Penalties | 6 min | Referees: Jamie Koharski; Peter Schlittenhart; Linesmen: Tom George; Jeff McCorkle |
| 13 | Shots | 24 | Referees: Jamie Koharski; Peter Schlittenhart; Linesmen: Tom George; Jeff McCorkle |

==== Regional Final ====
| March 30, 2019; 8:00 pm | (2) Denver | 3–0 (0–0, 1–0, 2–0) | (4) American International | Scheels Arena, Fargo, North Dakota; Attendance: 4,248 |

Game reference

Filip Larsson
Goalies
Zackarias Skog
Referees:
Dan Kovarik
Josh Lupenek
Linesmen:
Matt Tyree
Kyle Domin

| Colin Staub (7) (Barrow) – GW – 35:45 | 1–0 |
| Liam Finlay (16) (unassisted) – 56:30 | 2–0 |
| Jarid Lukosevicius (19) (unassisted) – EN – 58:37 | 3–0 |

12 min
Penalties
8 min
24
Shots
26

=== Midwest Region – Allentown, Pennsylvania ===
==== Regional semifinal ====
| March 30, 2019; 4:00 pm | (1) Minnesota–Duluth | 2 – 1 (OT) (0–0, 0–1, 1–0, 1–0) | (4) Bowling Green | PPL Center, Allentown, Pennsylvania; Attendance: 3,763 |

Game reference

Hunter Shepard
Goalies
Ryan Bednard
Referees:
Cameron Lynch
Robert St. Lawrence
Linesmen:
Jim Briggs
Ryan Knapp

| | 0–1 | 36:23 – Brandon Kruse (10) (Johnson, Craggs) |
| Parker Mackay (13) (Koepke) – 56:59 | 1–1 |
| Parker Mackay (14) (Koepke, Richards) – GW – 71:45 | 2–1 |

4 min
Penalties
8 min
42
Shots
31

| March 30, 2019; 8:00 pm | (2) Quinnipiac | 2–1 (1–0, 1–0, 0–1) | (3) Arizona State | PPL Center, Allentown, Pennsylvania; Attendance: 3,763 |

Game reference

Andrew Shortridge
Goalies
Joey Daccord
Referees:
Kevin Shea
Terrence Murphy
Linesmen:
Nick Briganti
Kevin Briganti

| Joe O'Connor (3) (Friedmann) – 03:54 | 1–0 |
| William Fällström (8) (Whelan, Martin) – GW – 26:59 | 2–0 |
| | 2–1 | 51:42 – Brinson Pasichnuk (13) (Maniscalco, Garcia) |

4 min
Penalties
21 min
38
Shots
21

==== Regional Final ====
| March 31, 2019; 6:30 pm | (1) Minnesota–Duluth | 3–1 (0–0, 1–0, 2–1) | (2) Quinnipiac | PPL Center, Allentown, Pennsylvania; Attendance: 3,531 |

Game reference

Hunter Shepard
Goalies
Andrew Shortridge
Referees:
Chris Ciamaga
Mike Schubert
Linesmen:
Brendan Lewis
Joe Sherman

| Peter Krieger (9) (Perunovich, Swaney) – 35:12 | 1–0 |
| Kobe Roth (8) (Miller, Exell) – GW – 54:58 | 2–0 |
| | 2–1 | 57:57 – PP EA – Craig Martin (11) (Rafferty) |
| Parker Mackay (15) (unassisted) – EN – 59:03 | 3–1 |

4 min
Penalties
4 min
26
Shots
22

=== East Region – Providence, Rhode Island ===
==== Regional semifinal ====
| March 30, 2019; 1:00 pm | (1) Minnesota State | 3–6 (3–1, 0–2, 0–3) | (4) Providence | Dunkin' Donuts Center, Providence, Rhode Island; Attendance: 7,180 |

Game reference

Dryden McKay
Goalies
Hayden Hawkey
Referees:
Brett Desrosiers
CJ Beaurline
Linesmen:
Joe Hutek
Tom Dellafranco

| Charlie Gerard (12) (Tuomie, Michaelis) – 07:52 | 1–0 |
| Jake Jaremko (7) (Lutz, Hookenson) – 08:28 | 2–0 |
| Nicholas Rivera (10) (unassisted) – 11:08 | 3–0 |
| | 3–1 | 13:12 – PP – Josh Wilkins (17) (Thompson, Printz) |
| | 3–2 | 24:37 – Vimal Sukumaran (14) (Tait) |
| | 3–3 | 29:33 – PP – Kasper Björkqvist (17) (Dugan, Bryson) |
| | 3–4 | 48:37 – GW PP – Tyce Thompson (8) (Duhaime, Wilkins) |
| | 3–5 | 49:55 – PP – Josh Wilkins (17) (Thompson, Duhaime) |
| | 3–6 | 57:50 – EN – Jason O'Neill (6) (unassisted) |

23 min
Penalties
6 min
34
Shots
29

| March 30, 2019; 4:30 pm | (2) Northeastern | 1–5 (0–1, 1–3, 0–1) | (3) Cornell | Dunkin' Donuts Center, Providence, Rhode Island; Attendance: 7,180 |

Game reference

Cayden Primeau
Goalies
Austin McGrath
Referees:
Colin Kronforst
Brian Aaron
Linesmen:
Sam Shikowsky
Nick Bradshaw

| | 0–1 | 04:02 – Beau Starrett (8) (Kaldis, McCrea) |
| | 0–2 | 20:54 – GW – Mitch Vanderlaan (11) (McCrea) |
| | 0–3 | 29:47 – Morgan Barron (15) (unassisted) |
| | 0–4 | 32:46 – PP – Michael Regush (12) (Andreev, McCrea) |
| Liam Pecararo (15) (Davies, Hawkins) – 36:00 | 1–4 |
| | 1–5 | 44:34 – Brenden Locke (7) (Donaldson) |

4 min
Penalties
12 min
21
Shots
19

==== Regional Final ====
| March 31, 2019; 4:00 pm | (3) Cornell | 0–4 (0–1, 0–2, 0–1) | (4) Providence | Dunkin' Donuts Center, Providence, Rhode Island; Attendance: 5,231 |

Game reference

Austin McGrath
Goalies
Hayden Hawkey
Referees:
Colin Kronforst
Brian Aaron
Linesmen:
Sam Shikowsky
Nick Bradshaw

| 0–1 | 10:20 – GW – Greg Printz (11) (Bryson, Desharnais) |
| 0–2 | 21:40 – Josh Wilkins (19) (Björkqvist, Dugan) |
| 0–3 | 39:59 – PP – Scott Conway (15) (Wilkins, Duhaime) |
| 0–4 | 58:13 – EN – Brandon Duhaime (11) (Conway) |

4 min
Penalties
6 min
19
Shots
29

=== Northeast Region – Manchester, New Hampshire ===
==== Regional semifinal ====
| March 29, 2019; 3:00 pm | (1) Massachusetts | 4–0 (0–0, 1–0, 3–0) | (4) Harvard | SNHU Arena, Manchester, New Hampshire; Attendance: 5,033 |

Game reference

Filip Lindberg
Goalies
Michael Lackey
Referees:
Cameron Voss
Nick Krebsbach
Linesmen:
Brandon Schmitt
John Philo

| Anthony Del Gaizo (6) (Keats, Farmer) – GW – 34:15 | 1–0 |
| John Leonard (14) (Hildenbrand, McLaughlin) – 47:24 | 2–0 |
| Brett Boeing (9) (Makar, Leonard) – 49:11 | 3–0 |
| Brett Boeing (10) (unassisted) – EN – 59:36 | 4–0 |

6 min
Penalties
8 min
36
Shots
17

| March 29, 2019; 6:30 pm | (2) Clarkson | 2 – 3 (OT) (1–0, 1–1, 0–1, 0–1) | (3) Notre Dame | SNHU Arena, Manchester, New Hampshire; Attendance: 5,033 |

Game reference

Jake Kielly
Goalies
Cale Morris
Referees:
Gene Binda
Ryan Hersey
Linesmen:
John Grandt
Sterling Egan

| Marly Quince (3) (Jokiharju, McCarthy) – 16:56 | 1–0 |
| | 1–1 | 24:58 – Colin Theisen (11) (Burke, Clurman) |
| Haralds Egle (19) (Thow, Brosseau) – 26:29 | 2–1 |
| | 2–2 | 57:40 – Bobby Nardella (8) (Burke, Peeke) |
| | 2–3 | 75:53 – GW – Cam Morrison (11) (Graham, Nardella) |

21 min
Penalties
8 min
22
Shots
38

==== Regional Final ====
| March 30, 2019; 4:00 pm | (1) Massachusetts | 4–0 (0–0, 3–0, 1–0) | (3) Notre Dame | SNHU Arena, Manchester, New Hampshire; Attendance: 5,679 |

Game reference

Filip Lindberg
Goalies
Cale Morris
Referees:
Gene Binda
Ryan Hersey
Linesmen:
John Grandt
Sterling Egan

| Jake Gaudet (7) (Ferraro, Farmer) – GW PP – 27:49 | 1–0 |
| John Leonard (15) (Boeing, Hildenbrand) – 30:32 | 2–0 |
| Cale Makar (16) (M. Del Gaizo, Gaudet) – 34:49 | 3–0 |
| Oliver Chau (9) (McLaughlin) – EN – 57:27 | 4–0 |

6 min
Penalties
8 min
34
Shots
13

=== Frozen Four – KeyBank Center, Buffalo, New York ===
==== National semifinal ====
| April 11, 2019; 5:00 pm ESPN2 | (MW1) Minnesota–Duluth | 4–1 (0–0, 1–1, 3–0) | (E4) Providence | KeyBank Center, Buffalo, New York; Attendance: 13,051 |

Game reference

Hunter Shepard
Goalies
Hayden Hawkey
Referees:
Chris Ciamaga
Mike Schubert
Linesmen:
Joe Sherman
Brendan Lewis

| Justin Richards (11) (Mackay, Anderson) – 26:39 | 1–0 |
| | 1–1 | 31:17 – PP – Josh Wilkins (20) (Duhaime, Bryson) |
| Billy Exell (3) (Roth, Samberg) – GW – 50:07 | 2–1 |
| Dylan Samberg (7) (unassisted) – EN – 59:27 | 3–1 |
| Justin Richards (13) (Cates) – EN – 59:54 | 4–1 |

6 min
Penalties
4 min
36
Shots
29

| April 11, 2019; 8:45 pm ESPN2 | (NE1) Massachusetts | 4 – 3 (OT) (3–1, 0–0, 0–2, 1–0) | (W2) Denver | KeyBank Center, Buffalo, New York; Attendance: 13,051 |

Game reference

Filip Lindberg
Goalies
Filip Larsson
Referees:
Dan Kovarik
Josh Lupinek
Linesmen:
Kyle Domin
Matt Tyree

| | 0–1 | 08:29 – PP – Colin Staub (8) (Olischefski, Guttman) |
| Bobby Trivigno (17) (Pritchard, M. Del Gaizo) – PP – 11:41 | 1–1 |
| Mitchell Chaffee (18) (Makar, Pritchard) – PP – 13:04 | 2–1 |
| John Leonard (16) (Ferraro, Gaudet) – PP – 13:22 | 3–1 |
| | 3–2 | 50:32 – Cole Guttman (13) (Ward, Durflinger) |
| | 3–3 | 56:14 – Cole Guttman (14) (McLellan, Lancaster) |
| Marc Del Gaizo (13) (Chau, Gaudet) – GW – 75:18 | 4–3 |

34 min
Penalties
21 min
28
Shots
40

=== 2019 National Championship ===
==== (MW1) Minnesota–Duluth vs. (NE1) Massachusetts ====
| April 13 | Minnesota–Duluth | 3–0 | Massachusetts | KeyBank Center | Recap |

Scoring summary
| Period | Team | Goal | Assist(s) | Time | Score |
|---|---|---|---|---|---|
| 1st | UMD | Parker Mackay (16) – GW PP | Anderson and Tufte | 3:51 | 1–0 UMD |
| 2nd | UMD | Mikey Anderson (6) | Mackay and Richards | 35:48 | 2–0 UMD |
| 3rd | UMD | Jackson Cates (8) | Laderoute and Anderson | 57:18 | 3–0 UMD |
Penalty summary
| Period | Team | Player | Penalty | Time | PIM |
| 1st | UMA | Marc Del Gaizo | Interference | 2:31 | 2:00 |
| 1st | UMD | Scott Perunovich | Holding | 12:23 | 2:00 |
| 1st | UMA | Jake Gaudet | Elbowing | 18:37 | 2:00 |
| 2nd | UMD | Noah Cates | Roughing | 36:59 | 2:00 |
| 2nd | UMA | Cale Makar | Interference | 39:41 | 2:00 |
| 3rd | UMD | Kobe Roth | Elbowing | 46:47 | 2:00 |
| 3rd | UMD | Peter Krieger | Holding | 54:58 | 2:00 |
| 3rd | UMA | Kurt Keats | Roughing | 58:15 | 2:00 |

Shots by period
| Team | 1 | 2 | 3 | T |
|---|---|---|---|---|
| Massachusetts | 5 | 7 | 6 | 18 |
| Minnesota–Duluth | 14 | 11 | 6 | 31 |

Goaltenders
| Team | Name | Saves | Goals against | Time on ice |
|---|---|---|---|---|
| UMA | Filip Lindberg | 28 | 3 | 60:00 |
| UMD | Hunter Shepard | 18 | 0 | 59:53 |

== All-Tournament team ==
- G: Hunter Shepard (Minnesota–Duluth)
- D: Mikey Anderson (Minnesota–Duluth)
- D: Marc Del Gaizo (Massachusetts)
- F: Parker Mackay* (Minnesota–Duluth)
- F: Justin Richards (Minnesota–Duluth)
- F: Billy Exell (Minnesota–Duluth)

* Most Outstanding Player(s)

== Record by conference ==
| Conference | # of Bids | Record | Win % | Regional Finals | Frozen Four | Championship Game | Champions |
|---|---|---|---|---|---|---|---|
| ECAC Hockey | 4 | 2–4 | .333 | 2 | – | – | – |
| NCHC | 3 | 6–2 | .750 | 2 | 2 | 1 | 1 |
| Hockey East | 3 | 5–3 | .625 | 2 | 2 | 1 | – |
| Big Ten | 2 | 1–2 | .333 | 1 | – | – | – |
| WCHA | 2 | 0–2 | .000 | – | – | – | – |
| Atlantic Hockey | 1 | 1–1 | .500 | 1 | – | – | – |
| Independent | 1 | 0–1 | .000 | – | – | – | – |

== Media ==
=== Television ===
ESPN had US television rights to all games during the tournament for the fifteenth consecutive year. ESPN aired every game, beginning with the regionals, on ESPN, ESPN2, ESPNews, ESPNU, and ESPN3, which were streamed online via WatchESPN.

In Canada, the tournament was broadcast by TSN and streamed on TSN Go.

In the UK, the tournament was broadcast by BT Sport ESPN.

==== Broadcast assignments ====
Regionals

- Northeast Regional: John Buccigross, Barry Melrose, Colby Cohen and Quint Kessenich – Manchester, New Hampshire
- West Regional: Clay Matvick and Dave Starman – Fargo, North Dakota
- East Regional: Leah Hextall and Billy Jaffe – Providence, Rhode Island
- Midwest Regional: Kevin Brown and Fred Pletsch – Allentown, Pennsylvania

Frozen Four

- John Buccigross, Barry Melrose, Colby Cohen and Quint Kessenich – Buffalo, New York

=== Radio ===
Westwood One had exclusive radio rights to the Frozen Four and broadcast both the semifinals and the championship.

- Brian Tripp, Pat Micheletti, & Shireen Saski
