= Josef Ingman =

Swedish ice hockey player

Josef Ingman (born March 8, 1995) is a professional Swedish Ice Hockey player. He is currently playing for MoDo in the Swedish hockey league (SHL). His youth team is Modo HK. He was born in Örnsköldsvik, Sweden.
