= Nils Rygaard =

Swedish ice hockey player

- Born: April 11, 1995 (age 31) Sweden
- Height: 5 ft 10 in (178 cm)
- Weight: 168 lb (76 kg; 12 st 0 lb)
- Position: Forward
- Shot: Left
- Played for: Södertälje SK; Nyköpings SK; Vimmerby HC
- Playing career: 2013–2020

Nils Rygaard (born April 11, 1995) is a Swedish former professional ice hockey player.

Rygaard made his debut with Linköpings HC during the 2013 European Trophy.
