= Matej Tomek =

Slovak ice hockey goaltender

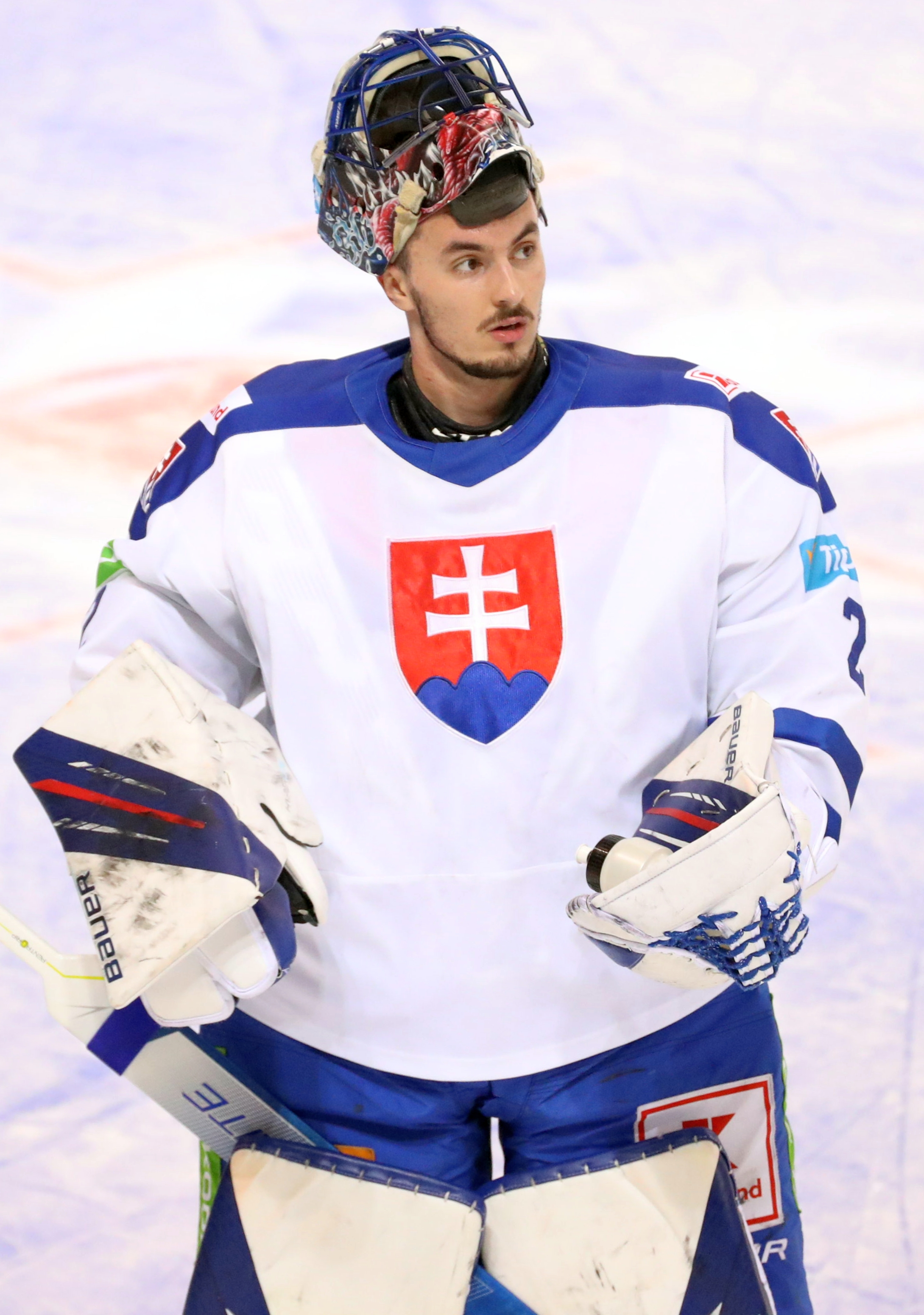
- Tomek with Slovakia at the 2022 IIHF World Championship
- Born: 24 May 1997 (age 29) Bratislava, Slovakia
- Height: 6 ft 3 in (191 cm)
- Weight: 180 lb (82 kg; 12 st 12 lb)
- Position: Goaltender
- Catches: Left
- ELH team Former teams: HC Verva Litvínov; HK Dukla Trenčín; HK 95 Považská Bystrica; SaiPa; KalPa
- National team: Slovakia
- NHL draft: 90th overall, 2015; Philadelphia Flyers
- Playing career: 2013–present

Matej Tomek (born 24 May 1997) is a Slovak professional ice hockey goaltender for HC Verva Litvínov of the Czech Extraliga (ELH).

== Playing career ==
Tomek spent the 2016–2017 season with the North Dakota Fighting Hawks men's ice hockey team. During his time at the University of North Dakota, Tomek played a total of two games.

Tomek previously played for HK Dukla Trenčín of the Slovak Tipsport liga during the 2019–20 season.

Medal record

Men's Ice hockey

Representing Slovakia

Olympic Games
Bronze medal – third place	2022 Beijing	

On 18 January 2022, he was named to the roster to represent Slovakia at the 2022 Winter Olympics.

== Career statistics ==
=== Regular season and playoffs ===
			Regular season										Playoffs
Season	Team	League	GP	W	L	T	OTL	MIN	GA	SO	GAA	SV%	GP	W	L	MIN	GA	SO	GAA	SV%
2016–17	University of North Dakota	NCAA	2					32:11			—	69.2%
