= Kurvinen =

Kurvinen is a Finnish surname. Notable people with the surname include:

- Antti Kurvinen (born 1986), Finnish politician
- Mikko Kurvinen (born 1979), Finnish ice hockey player

== See also ==
- Karvinen
- Kervinen
