= 2012–13 NAHL season =

- League: North American Hockey League
- Sport: Ice hockey
- Duration: Regular season September 8, 2012 – March 30, 2013; Postseason; April 4 – May 13, 2013
- Games: 60
- Teams: 24

Draft
- Top draft pick: Dan Sherer
- Picked by: Minot Minotauros

Regular season
- Season champions: Amarillo Bulls
- Season MVP: Jared VanWormer (Soo Eagles)
- Top scorer: Jared VanWormer (Soo Eagles)

Robertson Cup Playoffs
- Finals champions: Amarillo Bulls
- Runners-up: Wenatchee Wild

NAHL seasons
- ← 2011–12 2013–14 →

The 2012–13 NAHL season was the 29th season of the North American Hockey League. The regular season ran from September 2012 to April 2013 with a 60-game schedule for each team. The Amarillo Bulls won the regular season championship and went on to defeat the Wenatchee Wild 5 to 0 in the championship game to capture the Robertson Cup.

== Member changes ==
- During the previous season, the Chicago Hitmen had been locked out of their home arena due to unpaid fees. While they were able to come to an arrangement for the remainder of the season, the rink's owners did eventually file suit with the franchise for more than $100,000 in disputed charges. The Hitmen were disbanded prior to this season.
- Due to high travel costs, the Dawson Creek Rage announced that they would attempt to join the AJHL after the 2012 season. After the plans fell through, the franchise elected to suspend operations in April.
- In On March 2, 2012, the Soo Eagles announced that they had purchased the franchise rights to the Traverse City North Stars, the final condition for the team's move to the NAHL.
- In April, the Alexandria Blizzard announced their move to Brookings, South Dakota. The club would retain its moniker and become the Brookings Blizzard.
- One day later, the Alaska Avalanche announced that they were moving to Johnstown, Pennsylvania and would become the Johnstown Tomahawks.
- In May, the St. Louis Bandits applied for and were granted inactive status for this season. A little over a week later, the New Mexico Mustangs were also approved for a year-long dormancy.

== Regular season ==
The standings at the end of the regular season were as follows:

Note: x = clinched playoff berth; y = clinched division title; z = clinched regular season title

=== Standings ===
==== Central Division ====
Team	GP	W	L	OTL	Pts	GF	GA
xy – Austin Bruins	60	42	11	7	91	223	155
x – Bismarck Bobcats	60	35	16	9	79	183	140
x – Brookings Blizzard	60	32	23	5	69	175	179
x – Minot Minotauros	60	26	30	4	56	151	186
Aberdeen Wings	60	23	30	7	53	158	194
Coulee Region Chill	60	16	39	5	37	157	224

==== North Division ====
Team	GP	W	L	OTL	Pts	GF	GA
xy – Soo Eagles	60	41	14	5	87	203	155
x – Jamestown Ironmen	60	37	19	4	78	170	152
x – Kalamazoo Jr. K-Wings	60	35	19	6	76	184	169
x – Port Huron Fighting Falcons	60	32	24	4	68	178	163
x – Johnstown Tomahawks	60	27	21	12	66	179	177
x – Springfield Jr. Blues	60	26	30	4	56	159	181
Janesville Jets	60	23	27	10	56	147	182
Michigan Warriors	60	19	32	9	47	136	177

==== South Division ====
Team	GP	W	L	OTL	Pts	GF	GA
xyz – Amarillo Bulls	60	46	7	7	99	248	118
x – Topeka RoadRunners	60	39	14	7	85	190	146
x – Texas Tornado	60	36	22	2	74	219	168
x – Corpus Christi IceRays	60	28	26	6	62	194	200
Wichita Falls Wildcats	60	26	30	4	56	183	200
Odessa Jackalopes	60	6	51	3	15	121	309

==== West Division ====
Team	GP	W	L	OTL	Pts	GF	GA
xy – Wenatchee Wild	60	39	15	6	84	197	147
x – Fairbanks Ice Dogs	60	39	17	4	82	192	148
x – Kenai River Brown Bears	60	29	25	6	64	185	177
x – Fresno Monsters	60	18	35	7	43	139	224

=== Statistics ===
==== Scoring leaders ====
The following players led the league in regular season points at the completion of all regular season games.

Player	Team	GP	G	A	Pts	PIM
Jared VanWormer	Soo Eagles	60	25	51	76	28
Kyle Sharkey	Topeka RoadRunners	59	32	37	69	72
Brandon Wahlin	Austin Bruins	58	20	49	69	113
Rudy Sulmonte	Corpus Christi IceRays	60	27	41	68	42
Sean Gaffney	Topeka RoadRunners	58	26	40	66	47
A.J. Reid	Austin Bruins	55	25	40	65	50
Robbie Payne	Kalamazoo Jr. K-Wings	57	29	35	64	109
Eric Rivard	Soo Eagles	58	24	39	63	119
Jonathan Davis	Wenatchee Wild	59	32	29	61	110
C. J. Smith	Austin Bruins	60	30	29	59	22
Mike Davis	Amarillo Bulls	59	28	31	59	52

==== Leading goaltenders ====
Note: GP = Games played; Mins = Minutes played; W = Wins; L = Losses; OTL = Overtime losses; SOL = Shootout losses; SO = Shutouts; GAA = Goals against average; SV% = Save percentage

Player	Team	GP	Mins	W	L	OTL	SOL	GA	SV	SV%	GAA
Paul Berrafato	Amarillo Bulls	44	2455:08	33	3	2	3	68	839	.919	1.66
Aaron Nelson	Bismarck Bobcats	40	2298:03	24	7	1	5	72	982	.928	1.88
Zach Nagelvoort	Soo/Aberdeen	28	1601:08	17	6	0	2	56	834	.933	2.10
Spencer Viele	Topeka RoadRunners	41	2356:26	28	9	1	2	86	1,053	.918	2.19
Marcus Due-Boje	Kalamazoo Jr. K-Wings	23	1335:45	14	7	1	1	49	748	.935	2.20

== Robertson Cup playoffs ==
In the Semifinal, ties are broken first by head-to-head matchup and then by goal differential.

Division Play-in (Best-of-3)
N4	Port Huron Fighting Falcons	3	0	4*
N5	Johnstown Tomahawks	0	2	3
N3	Kalamazoo Jr. K-Wings	7	6	-
N6	Springfield Jr. Blues	1	0	-

Division Semifinals (Best-of-5)
C1	Austin Bruins	3	1	3*	1	-
C4	Minot Minotauros	1	2*	2	0	-
Central Division
C2	Bismarck Bobcats	8	6	6	-	-
C3	Brookings Blizzard	3	3	0	-	-
N1	Soo Eagles	4	4	4	-	-
N4	Port Huron Fighting Falcons	2	1	1	-	-
North Division
N2	Jamestown Ironmen	7	3	2	-	-
N3	Kalamazoo Jr. K-Wings	1	1	1	-	-
S1	Amarillo Bulls	1	6	5	5	-
S4	Corpus Christi IceRays	2	3	3	3	-
South Division
S2	Topeka Roadrunners	1	1	1	-	-
S3	Texas Tornado	2	2	8	-	-
W1	Wenatchee Wild	7	1	1	4	4
W4	Fresno Monsters	0	3	2*	2	1
West Division
W2	Fairbanks Ice Dogs	3	1	1	6*	3
W3	Kenai River Brown Bears	1	2	2	5	2

Division Finals (Best-of-5)
C1	Austin Bruins	4	2	2	1	-
C2	Bismarck Bobcats	2	5	3	2	-
N1	Soo Eagles	3	0	2	-	-
N2	Jamestown Ironmen	6	1	5	-	-
S1	Amarillo Bulls	4	5	6	-	-
S2	Texas Tornado	1	1	3	-	-
W1	Wenatchee Wild	1	3	3	2	3
W2	Fairbanks Ice Dogs	0	4	1	3	1

Semifinal (Round Robin)
C2	Bismarck Bobcats	-	4	1	3
N2	Jamestown Ironmen	3	-	1	2
S1	Amarillo Bulls	2*	2*	-	0
W1	Wenatchee Wild	2	5	7	-

Championship (Best-of-1)
S1	Amarillo Bulls	5
W1	Wenatchee Wild	0

Note: * denotes overtime period(s)

== Division Play-in ==
=== North Division ===
==== (N4) Port Huron Fighting Falcons vs. (E5) Johnstown Tomahawks ====
April 4	Port Huron Fighting Falcons	3 – 0	Johnstown Tomahawks	McMorran Arena
No scoring		First period	No scoring
No scoring		Second period	No scoring
8:02 - sh - Ryan Nick (1); 10:00 - Mitch Maloney (1); 19:31 - en - Rick DeRosa (1)		Third period	No scoring
Max Milosek (22 saves / 22 shots)		Goalie stats	Chris Truehl (23 saves / 25 shots)

April 5	Port Huron Fighting Falcons	0 – 2	Johnstown Tomahawks	McMorran Arena
No scoring		First period	No scoring
No scoring		Second period	Jeff Bergh (1) - 6:45; Cobi Smith-Mass (1) - 7:40
No scoring		Third period	No scoring
Max Milosek (23 saves / 25 shots)		Goalie stats	Chris Truehl (33 saves / 33 shots)

April 7	Port Huron Fighting Falcons	4 – 3	OT	Johnstown Tomahawks	McMorran Arena
No scoring		First period		4:39 - Brandon Reinholz (1)
Mitch Maloney (2) - 2:03		Second period		14:29 - Cody Gylling (1)
Rick DeRosa (2) - 12:59; Brett D'Andrea (1) - 19:25		Third period		8:45 - Mitch Kontny (1)
Ian Miller (1) - 3:28		First overtime period		No scoring
Max Milosek (26 saves / 29 shots)		Goalie stats		Chris Truehl (26 saves / 30 shots)

Port Huron wins series 2 – 1

==== (N3) Kalamazoo Jr. K-Wings vs. (N6) Springfield Jr. Blues ====
April 4	Kalamazoo Jr. K-Wings	7 – 1	Springfield Jr. Blues	Blue Rink
9:15 - Danny Hamburg (1); 11:59 - Mac McDonnell (1); 14:21 - Patrick Spellacy (1)		First period	No scoring
2:46 - Taylor Burden (1); 7:47 - Luc Boby (1); 11:11 - pp - Robbie Payne (1); 15:43 - Mac McDonnell (2)		Second period	No scoring
No scoring		Third period	Jack Sloan (1) - 10:37
Marcus Due-Boje (17 saves / 18 shots)		Goalie stats	Matt Leon (16 saves / 22 shots); Ryan Kellenberger (16 saves / 17 shots)

April 6	Kalamazoo Jr. K-Wings	6 – 0	Springfield Jr. Blues	Blue Rink
0:50 - Kody Polin (1); 8:43 - Mac McDonnell (3); 17:53 - pp - Mike Fazio (1)		First period	No scoring
1:40 - pp - Robbie Payne (2); 11:07 - Mac McDonnell (4)		Second period	No scoring
11:41 - Luc Boby (2)		Third period	No scoring
Marcus Due-Boje (27 saves / 27 shots)		Goalie stats	Matt Leon (7 saves / 10 shots); Ryan Kellenberger (22 saves / 25 shots)

Kalamazoo wins series 2 – 0

== Division Semifinals ==
=== Central Division ===
==== (C1) Austin Bruins vs. (C4) Minot Minotauros ====
April 12	Austin Bruins	3 – 1	Minot Minotauros	Riverside Arena
No scoring		First period	No scoring
10:06 - Michael Bond (1); 14:14 - Grant Eichstadt (1)		Second period	Cameron Rowat (1) - 13:49
19:35 - en - Nolan Kirley (1)		Third period	No scoring
Nick Lehr (23 saves / 24 shots)		Goalie stats	Tyler Parks (30 saves / 32 shots)

April 13	Austin Bruins	1 – 2	OT	Minot Minotauros	Riverside Arena
No scoring		First period		Wesley Iverson (1) - 2:33
No scoring		Second period		No scoring
5:30 - A.J. Reid (1)		Third period		No scoring
No scoring		First overtime period		Jadin Martin (1) - 8:52
Jason Pawloski (38 saves / 40 shots)		Goalie stats		Tyler Parks (38 saves / 39 shots)

April 19	Minot Minotauros	2 – 3	OT	Austin Bruins	Maysa Arena
1:28 - Lucas Oliver (1)		First period		John Simonson (1) - 4:00
19:33 - Wesley Iverson (2)		Second period		A.J. Reid (2) - 3:49
No scoring		Third period		No scoring
No scoring		First overtime period		Cody Dixon (1) - 7:02
Tyler Parks (34 saves / 37 shots)		Goalie stats		Nick Lehr (31 saves / 33 shots)

April 20	Minot Minotauros	0 – 1	Austin Bruins	Maysa Arena
No scoring		First period	John Simonson (2) - 14:33
No scoring		Second period	No scoring
No scoring		Third period	No scoring
Tyler Parks (31 saves / 32 shots)		Goalie stats	Nick Lehr (35 saves / 35 shots)

Austin wins series 3 – 1

==== (C2) Bismarck Bobcats vs. (C3) Brookings Blizzard ====
April 12	Bismarck Bobcats	8 – 3	Brookings Blizzard	V.F.W. Sports Center
2:58 - Matt Anders (1); 19:45 - Evan Giesler (1)		First period	Thomas Williams (1) - 7:22
0:45 - Patrick Moore (1); 15:39 - pp - Seth Blair (1); 16:00 - Patrick Moore (2)		Second period	No scoring
4:00 - Seth Blair (2); 8:29 - Seth Blair (3); 18:05 - Cory Chapman (1)		Third period	Eetu Karvinen (1) - 9:10; Thomas Williams (2) - 16:11
Aaron Nelson (20 saves / 23 shots)		Goalie stats	Drew Weigman (26 saves / 31 shots); Chase Wilson (19 saves / 22 shots)

April 13	Bismarck Bobcats	6 – 3	Brookings Blizzard	V.F.W. Sports Center
15:29 - Seth Blair (4)		First period	Tyler Cayemberg (1) - 7:17
9:46 - pp - Stanislav Dzakhov (1); 17:50 - Matt Anders (2)		Second period	Eric Brenk (1) - pp - 7:24
4:07 - Filip Starzyński (1); 15:08 - pp - Seth Blair (5); 19:23 - en - Evan Giesler (2)		Third period	Eric Brenk (2) - 10:11
Aaron Nelson (27 saves / 30 shots)		Goalie stats	Drew Weigman (31 saves / 36 shots)

April 19	Brookings Blizzard	0 – 6	Bismarck Bobcats	Larson Ice Center
No scoring		First period	Matt Pohlkamp (1) - pp - 1:59
No scoring		Second period	Shane Omdahl (1) - pp - 15:01; Stanislav Dzakhov (2) - pp - 18:43
No scoring		Third period	Cory Chapman (1) - 3:01; Bob Kinne (1) - 3:21; Cory Chapman (2) - sh - 17:53
Drew Weigman (22 saves / 28 shots)		Goalie stats	Aaron Nelson (16 saves / 16 shots); Bryan Nies (9 saves / 9 shots)

Bismarck wins series 3 – 0

=== North Division ===
==== (N1) Soo Eagles vs. (N4) Port Huron Fighting Falcons ====
April 12	Soo Eagles	4 – 2	Port Huron Fighting Falcons	Pullar Stadium
7:04 - Chris Waterstreet (1); 11:19 - Alexander Taulien (1)		First period	Brett D'Andrea (2) - 11:45; Rick DeRosa (3) - 16:15
6:28 - Pat Thompson (1); 14:50 - Chris Waterstreet (2)		Second period	No scoring
No scoring		Third period	No scoring
Tyler Marble (28 saves / 30 shots)		Goalie stats	Max Milosek (32 saves / 36 shots)

April 13	Soo Eagles	4 – 1	Port Huron Fighting Falcons	Pullar Stadium
16:38 - Matt Menta (1)		First period	Ian Miller (2) - 0:14
11:24 - pp - Eric Rivard (1); 17:33 - Kyle Loridon (1)		Second period	No scoring
18:12 - Sean Murphy (1)		Third period	No scoring
Tyler Marble (33 saves / 34 shots)		Goalie stats	Alex Blankenburg (33 saves / 37 shots)

April 19	Port Huron Fighting Falcons	1 – 4	Soo Eagles	Larson Ice Center
No scoring		First period	Jared VanWormer (1) - 16:08
No scoring		Second period	Mike Sabatini (1) - 3:27
7:49 - Payden Mielke (1)		Third period	Eric Rivard (1) - 8:54; Mike Sabatini (2) - 10:16
Max Milosek (26 saves / 30 shots)		Goalie stats	Tyler Marble (33 saves / 34 shots)

Soo wins series 3 – 0

==== (N2) Jamestown Ironmen vs. (N3) Kalamazoo Jr. K-Wings ====
April 12	Jamestown Ironmen	7 – 1	Kalamazoo Jr. K-Wings	Jamestown Savings Bank Ice Arena
3:30 - Tyler Dunagan (1); 8:44 - sh - Nathan Ropelewski (1); 10:47 - Ryan Doucet (1)		First period	No scoring
3:30 - Danny Cesarz (1); 11:42 - Brett Szajner (1); 12:09 - Evan Ritt (1)		Second period	No scoring
4:18 - Danny Cesarz (2)		Third period	Luc Boby (1) - 15:37
Joe Ballmer (33 saves / 34 shots)		Goalie stats	Alex Okicki (11 saves / 14 shots); Marcus Due-Boje (17 saves / 21 shots)

April 13	Jamestown Ironmen	3 – 1	Kalamazoo Jr. K-Wings	Jamestown Savings Bank Ice Arena
No scoring		First period	Danny Hamburg (1) - 7:54
15:07 - Victor Johansson (1)		Second period	No scoring
5:51 - pp - Ryan Doucet (2); 13:56 - Nicholas Sierra (1)		Third period	No scoring
Joe Ballmer (29 saves / 30 shots)		Goalie stats	Marcus Due-Boje (26 saves / 29 shots)

April 17	Kalamazoo Jr. K-Wings	1 – 2	Jamestown Ironmen	Wings West
No scoring		First period	Ryan Doucet (3) - 7:36
No scoring		Second period	No scoring
15:33 - Mac McDonnell (1)		Third period	Evan Ritt (2) - 15:42
Marcus Due-Boje (35 saves / 37 shots)		Goalie stats	Joe Ballmer (29 saves / 30 shots)

Jamestown wins series 3 – 0

=== South Division ===
==== (S1) Amarillo Bulls vs. (S4) Corpus Christi IceRays ====
April 5	Amarillo Bulls	1 – 2	Corpus Christi IceRays	Amarillo Civic Center
6:30 - Hampus Gustafsson (1)		First period	No scoring
No scoring		Second period	No scoring
No scoring		Third period	Emil Romig (1) - 3:20; Brandon Berkley (1) - 16:26
Paul Berrafato (19 saves / 21 shots)		Goalie stats	Hayden Stewart (38 saves / 39 shots)

April 6	Amarillo Bulls	6 – 3	Corpus Christi IceRays	Amarillo Civic Center
6:52 - Brady Ferguson (1); 7:13 - Brady Ferguson (2); 15:09 - Hampus Gustafsson (2)		First period	No scoring
7:05 - pp - Gage Christianson (1)		Second period	No scoring
4:52 - Dan McNamara (1); 16:03 - pp - T.J. Sherman (1)		Third period	Perry D'Arrisso (1) - 3:22; A.J. Jarosz (1) - 8:19; A.J. Jarosz (2) - 12:33
Paul Berrafato (26 saves / 29 shots)		Goalie stats	Ben Myers (42 saves / 48 shots)

April 9	Corpus Christi IceRays	3 – 5	Amarillo Bulls	American Bank Center
No scoring		First period	Ryan Cole (1) - 17:19
3:45 - pp - Rudy Sulmonte (1)		Second period	John Rey (1) - 2:49; T.J. Sherman (2) - 10:25; Geoff Fortman (1) - pp - 18:12
0:23 - Brandon Berkley (2); 13:28 - pp - Rudy Sulmonte (2)		Third period	John Rey (2) - 16:09
Hayden Stewart (36 saves / 41 shots)		Goalie stats	Paul Berrafato (22 saves / 25 shots)

April 10	Corpus Christi IceRays	3 – 5	Amarillo Bulls	American Bank Center
No scoring		First period	Dan McNamara (2) - 1:10
4:04 - Brandon Smith (1); 13:04 - Emil Romig (2)		Second period	John Rey (3) - 15:29; Tyler Deresky (1) - 15:47
4:51 - pp - Charles Baldwin (1)		Third period	Hampus Gustafsson (3) - 9:09; Mike Davis (1) - 18:48
Hayden Stewart (37 saves / 42 shots); Ben Myers (0 saves / 0 shots)		Goalie stats	Paul Berrafato (30 saves / 33 shots); Collin Delia (0 saves / 0 shots)

Amarillo wins series 3 – 1

==== (S2) Topeka Roadrunners vs. (S3) Texas Tornado ====
April 4	Topeka Roadrunners	1 – 2	Texas Tornado	Kansas Expocentre
No scoring		First period	No scoring
18:40 - Tyler Andrew (1)		Second period	Max Shuart (1) - ps - 18:04
No scoring		Third period	C.J. Reuschlein (1) - 5:39
Spencer Viele (13 saves / 15 shots)		Goalie stats	Hunter Leisner (35 saves / 36 shots)

April 5	Topeka Roadrunners	1 – 2	Texas Tornado	Kansas Expocentre
19:23 - Kyle Sharkey (1)		First period	No scoring
No scoring		Second period	C.J. Reuschlein (2) - 4:59; Scott Conway (1) - 10:14
No scoring		Third period	No scoring
Hunter Leisner (15 saves / 17 shots)		Goalie stats	Spencer Viele (24 saves / 25 shots)

April 7	Texas Tornado	8 – 1	Topeka Roadrunners	Dr Pepper Arena
4:56 - Scott Conway (2); 8:25 - Alexei Solovyov (1)		First period	No scoring
19:17 - Scott Conway (3)		Second period	No scoring
5:38 - Jason Eddy (1); 9:53 - Jackson Leef (1); 11:03 - Justin Greenberg (1); 17:24 - pp - Nick Blase (1); 19:47 - pp - Scott Conway (4)		Third period	Juraj Kucirko (1) - 10:28
Hunter Leisner (31 saves / 32 shots)		Goalie stats	Spencer Viele (22 saves / 29 shots); Parker Butler (1 save / 2 shots)

Texas wins series 3 – 0

=== West Division ===
==== (W1) Wenatchee Wild vs. (W4) Fresno Monsters ====
April 12	Wenatchee Wild	7 – 0	Fresno Monsters	Town Toyota Center
10:18 - Derick Kuchera (1); 11:57 - pp - Brian Williams (1)		First period	No scoring
9:56 - Evan Schmidbauer (1)		Second period	No scoring
5:00 - pp - Josh Hartley (1); 6:40 - pp - Noah Nelson (1); 8:51 - pp - Jonathan Davis (1); 18:58 - pp - Chris Kerr (1)		Third period	No scoring
Robert Nichols (23 saves / 23 shots)		Goalie stats	Tomas Sholl (34 saves / 41 shots)

April 13	Wenatchee Wild	1 – 3	Fresno Monsters	Town Toyota Center
No scoring		First period	Dan Sherer (1) - 0:18; Andrew Herlofsky (1) - 14:31
19:37 - Max McHugh (1)		Second period	Mitch Snyder (1) - 11:37
No scoring		Third period	No scoring
Robert Nichols (17 saves / 20 shots); Nick Schmit (3 saves / 3 shots)		Goalie stats	Tomas Sholl (35 saves / 36 shots)

April 17	Fresno Monsters	2 – 1	OT	Wenatchee Wild	Gateway Ice Center
No scoring		First period		Evan Schmidbauer (2) - 12:33
3:53 - Dan Sherer (2)		Second period		No scoring
No scoring		Third period		No scoring
7:52 - Matt Salituro (1)		First overtime period		No scoring
Tomas Sholl (37 saves / 38 shots)		Goalie stats		Robert Nichols (26 saves / 28 shots)

April 18	Fresno Monsters	2 – 4	Wenatchee Wild	Gateway Ice Center
8:07 - pp - Gordon Wells (1)		First period	Jacob Barber (1) - pp - 5:10
No scoring		Second period	Chris Kerr (2) - 4:10
7:41 - pp - Karl Andersen (1)		Third period	Jacob Barber (2) - pp - 5:11; Max McHugh (2) - en - 19:57
Tomas Sholl (31 saves / 34 shots)		Goalie stats	Robert Nichols (23 saves / 25 shots)

April 21	Wenatchee Wild	4 – 1	Fresno Monsters	Town Toyota Center
11:43 - Jacob Barber (3)		First period	Gordon Wells (2) - 14:17
14:52 - Jacob Barber (4)		Second period	No scoring
16:50 - pp - Nicholas Kuchera (1); 19:51 - en - Jacob Barber (5)		Third period	No scoring
Robert Nichols (17 saves / 18 shots)		Goalie stats	Tomas Sholl (34 saves / 37 shots)

Wenatchee wins series 3 – 2

==== (W2) Fairbanks Ice Dogs vs. (W3) Kenai River Brown Bears ====
April 12	Fairbanks Ice Dogs	3 – 1	Kenai River Brown Bears	Big Dipper Ice Arena
No scoring		First period	No scoring
5:57 - Lawrence Cornellier (1); 12:33 - pp - Kyle Lee (1)		Second period	No scoring
19:31 - en - Jakob Romo (1)		Third period	Brad LeLievre (1) - 9:38
Steve Perry (24 saves / 25 shots)		Goalie stats	Marcus Zelzer (19 saves / 21 shots)

April 13	Fairbanks Ice Dogs	1 – 2	Kenai River Brown Bears	Big Dipper Ice Arena
11:47 - pp - Lawrence Cornellier (2)		First period	Judd Loewenstein (1) - 7:42
No scoring		Second period	No scoring
No scoring		Third period	Alex Jackstadt (1) - pp - 9:28
Steve Perry (25 saves / 27 shots)		Goalie stats	Marcus Zelzer (29 saves / 30 shots)

April 19	Kenai River Brown Bears	2 – 1	Fairbanks Ice Dogs	Soldotna Sports Center
No scoring		First period	No scoring
No scoring		Second period	Jayson Angus (1) - 1:37
13:16 - Vincent Stefan (1); 18:14 - Jacob Davidson (1)		Third period	No scoring
Marcus Zelzer (23 saves / 24 shots)		Goalie stats	Steve Perry (33 saves / 35 shots)

April 20	Kenai River Brown Bears	5 – 6	OT	Fairbanks Ice Dogs	Soldotna Sports Center
No scoring		First period		Zack Rall (1) - pp - 2:04; Jayson Angus (2) - 9:27; Max Birkinbine (1) - 12:02
0:31 - pp - Zachary Lazzaro (1); 13:55 - Brad Duwe (1)		Second period		Lawrence Cornellier (3) - pp - 2:46
2:22 - pp - Mikhail Bushinski (1); 4:33 - pp - Brad Duwe (2); 12:12 - Zachary Lazzaro (2)		Third period		Tayler Munson (1) - 18:44
No scoring		First overtime period		Garret Clemment (1) - 4:09
Marcus Zelzer (8 saves / 11 shots); Evan McCarthy (17 saves / 20 shots)		Goalie stats		Steve Perry (31 saves / 36 shots)

April 22	Fairbanks Ice Dogs	3 – 2	Kenai River Brown Bears	Big Dipper Ice Arena
No scoring		First period	Albin Karlsson (1) - pp - 18:53
No scoring		Second period	Zack Zulkanycz (1) - 3:16
8:53 - Devin Loe (1); 11:21 - Colton Wolter (1); 18:57 - Jayson Angus (3)		Third period	No scoring
Steve Perry (29 saves / 31 shots)		Goalie stats	Marcus Zelzer (33 saves / 36 shots)

Fairbanks wins series 3 – 2

== Division Finals ==
=== Central Division ===
==== (C1) Austin Bruins vs. (C2) Bismarck Bobcats ====
April 26	Austin Bruins	4 – 2	Bismarck Bobcats	Riverside Arena
2:06 - C. J. Smith (1); 2:21 - C. J. Smith (2)		First period	No scoring
18:12 - John Simonson (3)		Second period	Cory Chapman (3) - 9:27
7:50 - C. J. Smith (3)		Third period	Stanislav Dzakhov (3) - 5:26
Nick Lehr (38 saves / 40 shots)		Goalie stats	Aaron Nelson (20 saves / 24 shots)

April 27	Austin Bruins	2 – 5	Bismarck Bobcats	Riverside Arena
No scoring		First period	Bob Kinne (2) - 16:59
12:03 - Cody Dixon (1)		Second period	Daniel Kovar (1) - 14:00; Matt Pohlkamp (2) - 18:13
1:37 - Ladislav Zikmund (1)		Third period	Daniel Kovar (2) - sh - 17:41; Adam Knochenmus (1) - 19:05
Nick Lehr (19 saves / 22 shots); Jason Pawloski (7 saves / 8 shots)		Goalie stats	Aaron Nelson (26 saves / 28 shots)

May 3	Bismarck Bobcats	3 – 2	Austin Bruins	V.F.W. Sports Center
No scoring		First period	John Simonson (4) - sh - 13:22
9:02 - pp - Shane Omdahl (2)		Second period	C. J. Smith (4) - 6:44
8:11 - Levi Blom (1); 11:11 - pp - Matt Pohlkamp (3)		Third period	No scoring
Aaron Nelson (28 saves / 30 shots)		Goalie stats	Nick Lehr (37 saves / 40 shots)

May 4	Bismarck Bobcats	2 – 1	Austin Bruins	V.F.W. Sports Center
18:03 - pp - Seth Blair (6)		First period	A.J. Reid (3) - 7:46
No scoring		Second period	No scoring
5:25 - Shane Omdahl (3)		Third period	No scoring
Aaron Nelson (36 saves / 37 shots)		Goalie stats	Jason Pawloski (36 saves / 38 shots)

Bismarck wins series 3 – 1

=== North Division ===
==== (N1) Soo Eagles vs. (N2) Jamestown Ironmen ====
April 26	Soo Eagles	3 – 6	Jamestown Ironmen	Pullar Stadium
4:32 - Brandon Adams (1)		First period	Nicholas Sierra (2) - pp - 11:38; Luc Gerdes (1) - 13:11; Evan Ritt (3) - 13:20; Danny Cesarz (3) - 15:27
0:26 - Brandon Adams (2)		Second period	Evan Ritt (4) - pp - 2:10
0:39 - J.D. Cotroneo (1)		Third period	Ryan Urso (1) - 7:07
Tyler Marble (32 saves / 38 shots)		Goalie stats	Joe Ballmer (30 saves / 33 shots)

April 27	Soo Eagles	0 – 1	Jamestown Ironmen	Pullar Stadium
No scoring		First period	No scoring
No scoring		Second period	Elliot Tisdale (1) - 6:25
No scoring		Third period	No scoring
Tyler Marble (32 saves / 33 shots)		Goalie stats	Joe Ballmer (34 saves / 34 shots)

May 2	Jamestown Ironmen	5 – 2	Soo Eagles	Jamestown Savings Bank Ice Arena
3:07 - Danny Cesarz (4); 5:59 - Evan Ritt (5); 18:11 - Ryan Doucet (4)		First period	No scoring
No scoring		Second period	Alexander Taulien (2) - 1:25; Dante Suffredini (1) - 14:23
5:23 - Dylan Zink (1); 18:28 - en - Huba Sekesi (1)		Third period	No scoring
Joe Ballmer (24 saves / 26 shots)		Goalie stats	Tyler Marble (31 saves / 35 shots)

Jamestown wins series 3 – 0

=== South Division ===
==== (S1) Amarillo Bulls vs. (S2) Texas Tornado ====
April 25	Amarillo Bulls	4 – 1	Texas Tornado	Amarillo Civic Center
15:00 - Hampus Gustafsson (4); 19:53 - T.J. Sherman (3)		First period	No scoring
19:01 - pp - Brady Ferguson (3)		Second period	Andrew Mayer (1) - pp - 8:03
18:51 - Ryan Cole (2)		Third period	No scoring
Paul Berrafato (25 saves / 26 shots)		Goalie stats	Hunter Leisner (50 saves / 54 shots)

April 26	Amarillo Bulls	5 – 1	Texas Tornado	Amarillo Civic Center
4:23 - Tyler Deresky (2)		First period	Brandon Hawkins (1) - pp - 18:22
0:15 - pp - Ryan Cole (3); 4:09 - sh - Brady Ferguson (4); 6:22 - Brady Ferguson (5); 11:40 - Mike Davis (2)		Second period	No scoring
No scoring		Third period	No scoring
Paul Berrafato (26 saves / 27 shots)		Goalie stats	Hunter Leisner (18 saves / 23 shots); Aaron Nelson (7 saves / 7 shots)

April 30	Texas Tornado	3 – 5	Amarillo Bulls	Comerica Center
5:23 - pp - Andrew Mayer (2)		First period	Omar Mullan (1) - pp - 7:11; Blake Roubos (1) - 17:05
18:02 - Mitchell McPherson (1)		Second period	No scoring
2:11 - Nick Neville (1)		Third period	Clint Carlisle (1) - 1:40; Brady Ferguson (6) - 14:10; Ryan Cole (4) - en - 19:38
Hunter Leisner (20 saves / 24 shots)		Goalie stats	Paul Berrafato (24 saves / 27 shots)

Amarillo wins series 3 – 0

=== West Division ===
==== (W1) Wenatchee Wild vs. (W2) Fresno Monsters ====
April 26	Wenatchee Wild	1 – 0	Fairbanks Ice Dogs	Town Toyota Center
No scoring		First period	No scoring
No scoring		Second period	No scoring
17:49 - David Mead (1)		Third period	No scoring
Robert Nichols (18 saves / 18 shots)		Goalie stats	Steve Perry (16 saves / 17 shots)

April 27	Wenatchee Wild	3 – 4	Fairbanks Ice Dogs	Town Toyota Center
No scoring		First period	Max Birkinbine (2) - 6:57; Tayler Munson (2) - 12:57
1:39 - Jonathan Davis (2)		Second period	Lawrence Cornellier (4) - 18:22
15:49 - Tyler Bruneteau (1); 19:13 - Jacob Barber (6)		Third period	Lawrence Cornellier (5) - 3:26
Robert Nichols (26 saves / 30 shots)		Goalie stats	Steve Perry (34 saves / 37 shots)

May 3	Fairbanks Ice Dogs	1 – 3	Wenatchee Wild	Big Dipper Ice Arena
No scoring		First period	Jonathan Davis (3) - 5:16
16:47 - Lawrence Cornellier (6)		Second period	Jonathan Davis (4) - pp - 1:21
No scoring		Third period	Joe Sullivan (1) - en - 19:34
Steve Perry (30 saves / 32 shots)		Goalie stats	Robert Nichols (26 saves / 27 shots)

May 4	Fairbanks Ice Dogs	3 – 2	Wenatchee Wild	Big Dipper Ice Arena
No scoring		First period	No scoring
12:40 - Lawrence Cornellier (7)		Second period	Max McHugh (3) - 12:27
12:48 - Colton Wolter (2); 13:49 - Tayler Munson (3)		Third period	Joe Sullivan (2) - 12:39
Steve Perry (21 saves / 23 shots)		Goalie stats	Robert Nichols (25 saves / 28 shots)

May 7	Wenatchee Wild	3 – 1	Fairbanks Ice Dogs	Town Toyota Center
No scoring		First period	No scoring
14:02 - Jacob Barber (7)		Second period	Jacob Hetz (1) - 5:56
7:45 - Brian Williams (2); 18:53 - en - Jonathan Davis (4)		Third period	No scoring
Robert Nichols (23 saves / 25 shots)		Goalie stats	Steve Perry (17 saves / 18 shots)

Wenatchee wins series 3 – 2

== Semifinals ==
=== May 10 ===
Wenatchee Wild	2 – 3	Bismarck Bobcats	Dr. Pepper Arena
3:58 - Dylan Abood (1)	First period	Joseph Giordano (1) - 3:22
9:03 - Evan Schmidbauer (3)	Second period	Matt Anders (3) - 10:37
No scoring	Third period	Stanislav Dzakhov (3) - 18:55
Robert Nichols (18 saves / 21 shots)	Goalie stats	Aaron Nelson (23 saves / 25 shots)

Amarillo Bulls	2 – 1	OT	Jamestown Ironmen	Dr. Pepper Arena
No scoring	First period		Matthew Crockett (1) - 13:27
No scoring	Second period		No scoring
7:01 - pp - Mike Davis (3)	Third period		No scoring
3:12 - Matt Sieckhaus (1)	First overtime period		No scoring
Paul Berrafato (17 saves / 18 shots)	Goalie stats		Joe Ballmer (18 saves / 20 shots)

=== May 11 ===
Wenatchee Wild	5 – 2	Jamestown Ironmen	Dr. Pepper Arena
11:49 - Chris Kerr (2); 14:02 - pp - Joe Sullivan (2)	First period	No scoring
1:07 - Jacob Barber (8); 8:48 - Chris Kerr (3)	Second period	Danny Cesarz (5) - 9:13
18:20 - Jonathan Davis (5)	Third period	Victor Johansson (2) - 8:51
Robert Nichols (14 saves / 16 shots)	Goalie stats	Joe Ballmer (27 saves / 32 shots)

Amarillo Bulls	2 – 1	OT	Bismarck Bobcats	Dr. Pepper Arena
No scoring	First period		No scoring
3:39 - pp - Gage Christianson (2)	Second period		No scoring
No scoring	Third period		Stanislav Dzakhov (4) - 11:26
17:37 - pp - Ryan Cole (5)	First overtime period		No scoring
Paul Berrafato (28 saves / 29 shots)	Goalie stats		Aaron Nelson (21 saves / 23 shots)

=== May 12 ===
Amarillo Bulls	0 – 7	Wenatchee Wild	Dr. Pepper Arena
No scoring	First period	Trevor Stewart (1) - 0:36; Max McHugh (4) - 2:24; Josh Hartley (2) - 4:56; Jonathan Davis (6) - 10:50
No scoring	Second period	Brian Williams (3) - sh - 9:58; Noah Nelson (2) - pp - 15:29
No scoring	Third period	Joe Sullivan (3) - pp - 7:24
Paul Berrafato (6 saves / 9 shots); Collin Delia (15 saves / 19 shots)	Goalie stats	Robert Nichols (18 saves / 18 shots)

Bismarck Bobcats	4 – 3	Jamestown Ironmen	Dr. Pepper Arena
1:25 - Stanislav Dzakhov (6)	First period	No scoring
5:18 - Ryan Callahan (1); 9:25 - Chris Diver (1); 19:53 - Cory Chapman (5)	Second period	Danny Cesarz (6) - 1:07
No scoring	Third period	Victor Johansson (3) - pp - 2:55; Tyler Dunagan (2) - 19:59
Aaron Nelson (5 saves / 6 shots); Bryan Nies (9 saves / 11 shots)	Goalie stats	Joe Ballmer (13 saves / 16 shots); Blake Wojtala (16 saves / 17 shots)

== Robertson Cup Finals ==
=== (S1) Amarillo Bulls vs. (W1) Wenatchee Wild ===
May 13	Wenatchee Wild	0 – 5	Amarillo Bulls	Big Dipper Ice Arena
No scoring		First period	7:32 - pp - Joe Grabowski (1); 14:19 - Tyler Deresky (3)
No scoring		Second period	12:30 - sh - Ryan Cole (6); 14:56 - Ryan Cole (7)
No scoring		Third period	15:07 - Omar Mullan (2)
Robert Nichols (19 saves / 24 shots)		Goalie stats	Paul Berrafato (16 saves / 16 shots)
