= Dylan Zink =

American ice hockey player (born 1992)

- Born: October 8, 1992 (age 34) Madison, Wisconsin, USA
- Height: 5 ft 11 in (180 cm)
- Weight: 183 lb (83 kg; 13 st 1 lb)
- Position: Defenseman
- Shot: Left
- Played for: Wilkes-Barre/Scranton Penguins; Wheeling Nailers; Sparta Warriors; Karlskrona HK; South Carolina Stingrays; Toledo Walleye
- Playing career: 2013–2020
- Coaching career

Biographical details
- Education: UMass Lowell

Coaching career (HC unless noted)
- 2023–2025: UMass Lowell (asst)

Administrative career (AD unless noted)
- 2020–2023: UMass Lowell (Dir. of Hockey Ops)

Dylan Zink is an American ice hockey executive and former defenseman. He was an All-American for Massachusetts Lowell.

== Playing career ==
Zink's college career began in 2013 when he debuted for the ice hockey team at the University of Massachusetts Lowell. His first season was rather unimpressive, scoring just a single point in 26 games, but he did help the team capture the Hockey East Tournament. Zink found his game as a sophomore and led the team's defense in scoring, retaining that honor for the remainder of his time with the River Hawks. After helping the team return to the NCAA Tournament as a junior, Zink had his best offensive season in 2017 and was named an All-American. He led the team to a first place finish as well as its third Hockey East championship.

Zink signed with the Wilkes-Barre/Scranton Penguins after Lowell was eliminated and he finished out the year in the AHL. In his first full season as a professional, Zink started in Wilkes-Barre but was demoted to the ECHL after just 7 appearances. He found much greater success with the Wheeling Nailers, averaging nearly a point every other game, but decided to head to Europe after the season. He played well in a top Norwegian league but his production suffered when he moved over to the second Swedish league, HockeyAllsvenskan. After just 20 games, Zink returned to the ECHL and finished out the season before retiring as a player.

In 2020, Zink returned to his alma mater as the Director of Hockey Operations, a position he continues to hold as of 2021.

== Career statistics ==
=== Regular season and playoffs ===
			Regular season					Playoffs
Season	Team	League	GP	G	A	Pts	PIM	GP	G	A	Pts	PIM
2010–11	Monona Grove High School	WI-HS	24	13	48	61	66	—	—	—	—	—
2011–12	Alexandria Blizzard	NAHL	50	6	16	22	20	4	1	2	3	2
2012–13	Alexandria Blizzard	NAHL	4	1	2	3	12	—	—	—	—	—
2012–13	Jamestown Ironmen	NAHL	52	15	17	32	47	3	1	2	2	2
2013–14	Massachusetts Lowell	Hockey East	26	0	1	1	12	—	—	—	—	—
2014–15	Massachusetts Lowell	Hockey East	37	10	16	26	42	—	—	—	—	—
2015–16	Massachusetts Lowell	Hockey East	39	11	13	24	22	—	—	—	—	—
2016–17	Massachusetts Lowell	Hockey East	41	10	26	36	53	—	—	—	—	—
2016–17	Wilkes-Barre/Scranton Penguins	AHL	1	0	0	0	0	—	—	—	—	—
2017–18	Wilkes-Barre/Scranton Penguins	AHL	7	0	1	1	2	—	—	—	—	—
2017–18	Wheeling Nailers	ECHL	46	4	18	22	25	—	—	—	—	—
2018–19	Sparta Warriors	GET-ligaen	48	5	31	36	48	6	1	7	8	8
2019–20	Karlskrona HK	HockeyAllsvenskan	20	0	2	2	12	—	—	—	—	—
2019–20	South Carolina Stingrays	ECHL	18	3	3	6	6	—	—	—	—	—
2019–20	Toledo Walleye	ECHL	19	1	4	5	29	—	—	—	—	—
NAHL totals			106	22	35	57	79	7	1	4	5	4
NCAA totals			143	31	56	87	129	—	—	—	—	—
ECHL totals			83	8	25	33	60	—	—	—	—	—

== Awards and honors ==
Award	Year
All-Hockey East Second Team	2016–17
AHCA East Second Team All-American	2016–17
