= Eetu =

Eetu is a male given name. It may refer to:

- Sulo Eetu Jussila (1882-1973), Finnish politician and farmer
- Eetu Karvinen (born 1993), Finnish ice hockey player
- Eetu Koski (born 1992), Finnish ice hockey player
- Eetu Luostarinen (born 1998), Finnish ice hockey player
- Eetu Muinonen (born 1986), Finnish footballer
- Eetu Pöysti (born 1989), Finnish ice hockey player
- Eetu Qvist (born 1983), Finnish ice hockey player
- Johan Edvard Eetu Salin (1866–Helsinki), Finnish shoemaker, journalist and politician
- Eetu Sopanen (born 1996), Finnish ice hockey player
- Eetu Tuulola (born 1998), Finnish ice hockey player
- Eetu Uusitalo, former member of the Finnish alternative rock/metal band Sara
- Eetu Vähäsöyrinki (born 1990), Finnish Nordic combined skier
- nickname of Edvard Westerlund (1901-1982), Finnish Greco-Roman wrestler, 1924 Olympic champion
