= Lipsbergs =

Male given name

Origin
- Origin: From the German language Lipsberg

Lipsbergs (feminine: Lipsberga) is a Latvian masculine surname, derived from the German language. Individuals with the surname include:

- Edgars Lipsbergs (born 1989), Latvian ice hockey player
- Miks Lipsbergs (born 1991), Latvian ice hockey player
- Roberts Lipsbergs (born 1994), Latvian ice hockey player
