= Tuukka Mäntylä =

Finnish ice hockey player (born 1981)

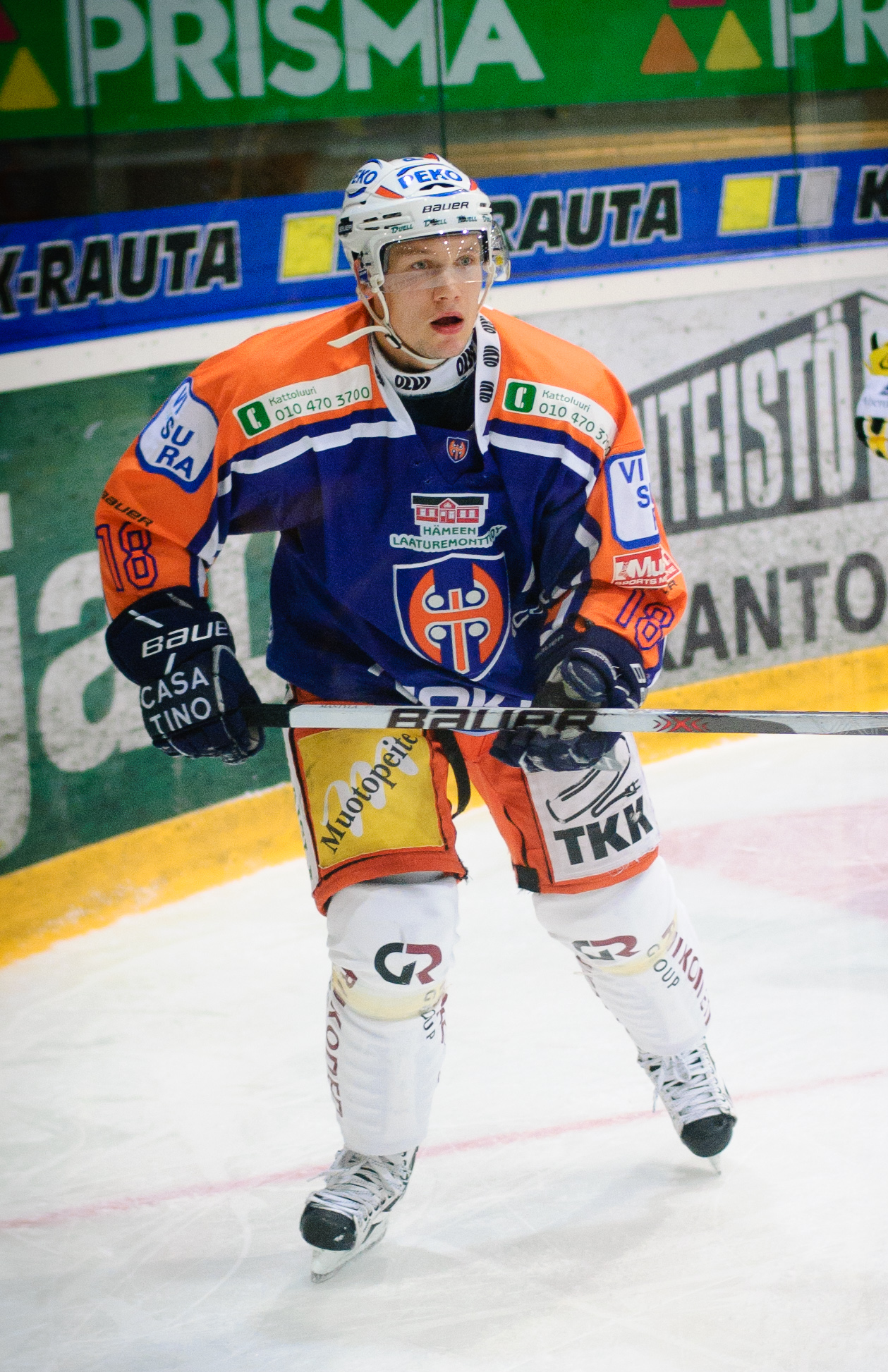
- Born: 25 May 1981 (age 45) Tampere, FIN
- Height: 5 ft 8 in (173 cm)
- Weight: 181 lb (82 kg; 12 st 13 lb)
- Position: Defence
- Shot: Left
- Played for: Tappara; Luleå HF; Frölunda HC; Neftekhimik Nizhnekamsk; Metallurg Novokuznetsk; Amur Khabarovsk; KHL Medveščak Zagreb; HC Kunlun Red Star; Malmö Redhawks
- National team: Finland
- NHL draft: 153rd overall, 2001; Los Angeles Kings
- Playing career: 1999–2020
Medal record
World Championships
Silver medal – second place	2014 Belarus

Tuukka Matias Mäntylä (born 25 May 1981) is a Finnish former professional ice hockey defenceman. He was selected by the Los Angeles Kings in the 5th round (153rd overall) of the 2001 NHL entry draft.

== Playing career ==
Mäntylä came through the youth ranks of Tampere Tappara and made his debut in Finland's top-tier Liiga in the course of the 1999–2000 season. He won the Finnish national championship with Tappara in 2003 and subsequently parted ways with the team to take his game to Sweden, where he joined Luleå HF of the Swedish Elite League (SHL). He enjoyed a two-year stint there before returning to Tappara. After another two years at his hometown team, Mäntylä embarked on a second SHL tenure, playing for Frölunda HC from 2007 to 2009.

On 7 April 2009, he left Frölunda and signed a contract to return to Tappara.

In late October 2009, playing with Tampere Tappara, Mäntylä checked Helsinki IFK defenceman Mikko Kurvinen from behind into the boards, resulting in an injury that kept Kurvinen sidelined for six games. Mäntylä received a match penalty for the hit. In advance of Tappara's next visit to Helsinki on 26 November 2009, the IFK club ran a full-page ad in a Tampere newspaper that read: “Welcome to Helsinki, Tuukka”, and on the evening of the match between the two clubs the SM-liiga head office, which had previously approved the ad, announced it had given IFK a warning for “crossing the line of good taste”. Early in the first period of the 26 November game, with IFK head coach Kari Jalonen watching, IFK defenceman Ilari Melart mugged Mäntylä in the corner, and a wrestling match ensued, resulting in both players being ejected from the game.

Between the 2011–12 and the 2015–16 season, he split time between Tappara and KHL outfits HC Neftekhimik Nizhnekamsk, Metallurg Novokuznetsk, Amur Khabarovsk and KHL Medvescak Zagreb.

In July 2016, he was one of the first players to ink a deal with the newly founded KHL side Kunlun Red Star from China.

== Career statistics ==
=== Regular season and playoffs ===
			Regular season					Playoffs
Season	Team	League	GP	G	A	Pts	PIM	GP	G	A	Pts	PIM
1995–96	Tappara	FIN U16	32	2	2	4	28	—	—	—	—	—
1996–97	Tappara	FIN U16	32	12	25	37	52	4	1	2	3	2
1996–97	Tappara	FIN U18	2	0	0	0	2	—	—	—	—	—
1997–98	Tappara	FIN U18	31	2	23	25	49	—	—	—	—	—
1997–98	Tappara	FIN U20	2	0	0	0	0	6	0	0	0	4
1998–99	Tappara	FIN U18	10	4	4	8	18	—	—	—	—	—
1998–99	Tappara	FIN U20	34	5	13	18	42	—	—	—	—	—
1999–2000	Tappara	FIN U20	7	2	5	7	22	5	2	5	7	4
1999–2000	Tappara	SM-liiga	43	2	8	10	16	4	0	0	0	0
2000–01	Tappara	SM-liiga	53	6	14	20	32	10	2	2	4	10
2001–02	Tappara	SM-liiga	56	5	10	15	70	10	2	4	6	8
2002–03	Tappara	SM-liiga	54	3	19	22	58	15	0	2	2	6
2003–04	Luleå HF	SEL	43	6	10	16	67	5	0	0	0	2
2004–05	Luleå HF	SEL	48	8	14	22	40	4	1	0	1	4
2005–06	Tappara	SM-liiga	56	6	16	22	81	4	1	0	1	29
2006–07	Tappara	SM-liiga	55	5	16	21	62	5	2	1	3	8
2007–08	Frölunda HC	SEL	45	1	10	11	46	7	0	3	3	4
2008–09	Frölunda HC	SEL	53	3	17	20	52	11	0	0	0	2
2009–10	Tappara	SM-liiga	47	5	17	22	145	9	0	2	2	10
2010–11	Tappara	SM-liiga	57	5	19	24	93	—	—	—	—	—
2011–12	Tappara	SM-liiga	12	4	7	11	14	—	—	—	—	—
2011–12	Neftekhimik Nizhnekamsk	KHL	38	0	17	17	39	—	—	—	—	—
2012–13	Tappara	SM-liiga	57	3	21	24	71	15	0	8	8	18
2013–14	Metallurg Novokuznetsk	KHL	53	4	12	16	32	—	—	—	—	—
2014–15	Tappara	Liiga	24	1	7	8	16	—	—	—	—	—
2014–15	Amur Khabarovsk	KHL	25	2	4	6	59	—	—	—	—	—
2015–16	KHL Medveščak Zagreb	KHL	48	8	10	18	64	—	—	—	—	—
2015–16	Tappara	Liiga	11	2	0	2	2	18	0	2	2	20
2016–17	Kunlun Red Star	KHL	57	10	14	24	56	4	2	5	7	12
2017–18	Malmö Redhawks	SHL	50	0	11	11	32	5	0	0	0	0
2018–19	Tappara	Liiga	49	1	12	13	42	11	2	1	3	10
2019–20	Tappara	Liiga	47	2	5	7	55	—	—	—	—	—
SM-liiga/Liiga totals			621	50	171	221	757	101	9	22	31	119
SEL/SHL totals			239	18	62	80	237	32	1	3	4	12
KHL totals			221	24	57	81	250	4	2	5	7	12

=== International ===
Year	Team	Event	GP	G	A	Pts	PIM
1998	Finland	EJC	6	0	1	1	0
1999	Finland	WJC18	6	1	0	1	8
2000	Finland	WJC	7	0	3	3	14
2001	Finland	WJC	7	1	4	5	6
2004	Finland	WC	7	0	2	2	0
2006	Finland	WC	9	0	0	0	8
2007	Finland	WC	5	0	2	2	2
2013	Finland	WC	10	0	3	3	2
2014	Finland	WC	10	2	3	5	12
2015	Finland	WC	8	0	0	0	0
Junior totals			26	2	8	10	28
Senior totals			49	2	10	12	24

Awards and achievements
Preceded by Pekka Saravo	Captain of Tappara; 2012–2013	Succeeded by Ville Nieminen
