= 2009–10 NAHL season =

- League: North American Hockey League
- Sport: Ice hockey
- Duration: Regular season September 11, 2009 – March 28, 2010; Postseason; April 2 – May 9, 2010
- Games: 58
- Teams: 19

Regular season
- Season champions: Wenatchee Wild
- Season MVP: Erik Higby (Topeka RoadRunners)
- Top scorer: Erik Higby (Topeka RoadRunners)

Robertson Cup Playoffs
- Finals champions: Bismarck Bobcats
- Runners-up: Fairbanks Ice Dogs

NAHL seasons
- ← 2008–09 2010–11 →

The 2009–10 NAHL season was the 26th season of the North American Hockey League. The regular season ran from September 2009 to April 2010 with a 58-game schedule for each team. The Wenatchee Wild won the regular season championship. The Bismarck Bobcats defeated the Fairbanks Ice Dogs 3 to 0 to capture the Robertson Cup.

== Member changes ==
- In April of 2009, the United States Hockey League announced that they would be expanding by accepting two NAHL teams, the Mahoning Valley Phantoms and USNTDP, for the upcoming season.
- The Texas Tornado sat out the previous season due to renovations at their home rink, the Deja Blue Arena. With the venue now ready to host events once more, it was renamed Dr Pepper Arena and Tornado returned to league play.
- In 2009, the NAHL approved Janesville, Wisconsin as the site for a new expansion franchise. In June, the team revealed their new name as the Janesville Jets.
- Towards the end of June, the Motor City Machine announced that they were changing their logo and name to Motor City Metal Jackets.

== Regular season ==
The standings at the end of the regular season were as follows:

Note: x = clinched playoff berth; y = clinched division title; z = clinched regular season title

=== Standings ===
==== Central Division ====
Team	GP	W	L	OTL	Pts	GF	GA
xy – Bismarck Bobcats	58	39	11	8	86	195	130
x – Owatonna Express	58	32	22	4	68	188	190
x – Alexandria Blizzard	58	30	22	6	66	180	166
x – Albert Lea Thunder	58	19	34	6	43	153	231
North Iowa Outlaws	58	15	37	6	36	147	234

==== North Division ====
Team	GP	W	L	OTL	Pts	GF	GA
xy – Marquette Rangers	58	35	22	1	71	186	154
x – Traverse City North Stars	58	33	20	5	71	217	172
x – Janesville Jets	58	29	23	6	64	169	172
x – Motor City Metal Jackets	58	25	26	7	57	158	189
Alpena IceDiggers	58	22	34	2	46	169	201

==== South Division ====
Team	GP	W	L	OTL	Pts	GF	GA
xy – Topeka RoadRunners	58	44	9	5	93	254	147
x – St. Louis Bandits	58	44	11	3	91	211	125
x – Texas Tornado	58	25	28	5	55	170	204
x – Springfield Jr. Blues	58	21	29	8	50	163	193
Wichita Falls Wildcats	58	18	34	6	42	175	251

==== West Division ====
Team	GP	W	L	OTL	Pts	GF	GA
xyz – Wenatchee Wild	58	45	10	3	93	219	125
x – Alaska Avalanche	58	32	19	7	71	198	178
x – Fairbanks Ice Dogs	58	32	22	4	68	203	182
x – Kenai River Brown Bears	58	12	40	6	30	144	247

=== Statistics ===
==== Scoring leaders ====
The following players led the league in regular season points at the completion of all regular season games.

Player	Team	GP	G	A	Pts	PIM
Erik Higby	Topeka RoadRunners	57	27	53	80	68
Michael Juola	Fairbanks Ice Dogs	58	22	55	77	70
Jared Rickord	Springfield Jr. Blues	58	28	40	68	14
Andrew Kolb	Marquette Rangers	58	24	41	65	34
Garrett Ladd	Marquette Rangers	55	23	40	63	105
Nardo Nagtzaam	Alexandria Blizzard	54	24	37	61	55
Brian Sheehan	Wichita Falls Wildcats	58	29	31	60	70
Mark Pustin	Fairbanks Ice Dogs	53	23	36	59	29
Jason Fabian	Bismarck Bobcats	57	24	34	58	81
Kyle Clay	Alexandria Blizzard	58	21	36	57	46

==== Leading goaltenders ====
Note: GP = Games played; Mins = Minutes played; W = Wins; L = Losses; OTL = Overtime losses; SOL = Shootout losses; SO = Shutouts; GAA = Goals against average; SV% = Save percentage

Player	Team	GP	Mins	W	L	OTL	SOL	GA	SO	SV	SV%	GAA
Brandon Jaeger	Wenatchee Wild	29	1604:35	22	3	1	0	49	3	631	.928	1.83
Lukas Hafner	Marquette Rangers	21	1071:53	11	6	0	0	37	3	558	.938	2.07
Tyler Bruggeman	St. Louis Bandits	36	2136:22	24	8	0	2	75	2	936	.926	2.11
Ryan Faragher	Bismarck Bobcats	38	2125:58	23	6	2	5	77	4	897	.921	2.17
Evan Karambelas	Topeka RoadRunners	27	1622:45	22	4	0	1	62	2	504	.890	2.29

== Robertson Cup playoffs ==
Five teams qualified for the Round Robin semifinal, the host (Wenatchee) and the four division champions. If Wenatchee won the west division final, the runner-up would receive the final qualifying spot. For the round robin semifinal, ties were broken first by head-to-head matchup and then by goal differential.

Division Semifinals (Best-of-5)
C1	Bismarck Bobcats	4	8	4	-	-
C4	Albert Lea Thunder	2	2	1	-	-
Central Division
C2	Owatonna Express	7*	2	2	2	-
C3	Alexandria Blizzard	6	3	6	5	-
N1	Marquette Rangers	2	1	3	-	-
N4	Motor City Machine	5	2	4***	-	-
North Division
N2	Traverse City North Stars	7	4	2	-	-
N3	Janesville Jets	1	0	0	-	-
S1	Topeka RoadRunners	1	7	8	4	-
S4	Springfield Jr. Blues	4	2	1	3	-
South Division
S2	St. Louis Bandits	2	1	1	3***	3*
S3	Texas Tornado	3	3	0	2	2
W1	Wenatchee Wild	5	5	3	-	-
W4	Kenai River Brown Bears	2	2	1	-	-
West Division
W2	Alaska Avalanche	1	4	2	-	-
W3	Fairbanks Ice Dogs	2*	6	4	-	-

Division Finals (Best-of-5)
C1	Bismarck Bobcats	9	5	3	-	-
C2	Alexandria Blizzard	1	2	1	-	-
N4	Motor City Machine	1	1	3	-	-
N2	Traverse City North Stars	4	5	5	-	-
S1	Topeka RoadRunners	1	6	1	4	0
S2	St. Louis Bandits	2	2	4	1	5
W1	Wenatchee Wild	6	6	7	-	-
W3	Fairbanks Ice Dogs	2	2	1	-	-

Semifinal (Round Robin)
C1	Bismarck Bobcats	-	6	5	1	3
N2	Traverse City North Stars	1	-	1	5	2
S2	St. Louis Bandits	3	4	-	4	3
W1	Wenatchee Wild	2	4	5*	-	2
W3	Fairbanks Ice Dogs	4	1	4	3	-

Championship (Best-of-1)
C1	Bismarck Bobcats	3
W3	Fairbanks Ice Dogs	0

Note: * denotes overtime period(s)

== Division Semifinals ==
=== Central Division ===
==== (C1) Bismarck Bobcats vs. (C4) Albert Lea Thunder ====
April 2	Bismarck Bobcats	4 – 2	Albert Lea Thunder	V.F.W. Sports Center
10:27 - pp - Sean McKenzie (1)		First period	Anthony Iaquinto (1) - 2:50; Niko Kapetanovic (1) - 13:38
1:34 - pp - Tim Serratore (1)		Second period	No scoring
7:44 - Dominic Panetta (1); 13:07 - Trent Johnson (1)		Third period	No scoring
Jake Williams (24 saves / 26 shots)		Goalie stats	Joe Rogers (34 saves / 38 shots)

April 3	Bismarck Bobcats	8 – 2	Albert Lea Thunder	V.F.W. Sports Center
10:34 - Jason Fabian (1); 15:31 - Ryan Jacobson (1)		First period	Brian Nehring (1) - 11:06
4:47 - Tim Serratore (2); 11:24 - Casey Kleisinger (1); 13:04 - Ryan Jacobson (2); 14:13 - Aaron Quick (1)		Second period	No scoring
7:59 - sh - Aaron Quick (2); 15:17 - pp - Tyler Klein (1)		Third period	Sheldon Taylor (1) - 10:06
Jake Williams (24 saves / 26 shots)		Goalie stats	Joe Rogers (25 saves / 33 shots)

April 9	Albert Lea Thunder	1 – 6	Bismarck Bobcats	Albert Lea City Arena
No scoring		First period	Dominic Panetta (2) - pp - 16:34; Ryan Jacobson (3) - 19:26
No scoring		Second period	Dominic Panetta (3) - pp - 0:15; Jason Fabian (2) - pp - 1:51
14:56 - Anthony Iaquinto (2)		Third period	Sam Rendle (1) - 1:37; Ryan Jacobson (4) - pp - 13:12
Joe Rogers (36 saves / 42 shots)		Goalie stats	Ryan Faragher (43 saves / 44 shots)

Bismarck wins series 3 – 0

==== (C2) Owatonna Express vs. (C3) Alexandria Blizzard ====
April 2	Owatonna Express	7 – 6	OT	Alexandria Blizzard	Shattuck St. Mary's Ice Arena
6:16 - Chris Darnell (1); 8:58 - Cory Thorson (1); 11:54 - sh - Dylan Porter (1)		First period		Grant Dye (1) - 5:53; Alex Altenbernd (1) - 9:17
0:22 - Jake Youso (1); 10:35 - Dan Cecka (1)		Second period		Simon Cederborg-Nilsson (1) - 3:05; Michael Benedict (1) - sh - 16:46
6:06 - pp - Jacob Sloat (1)		Third period		Nardo Nagtzaam (1) - pp - 3:59; Chris Franks (1) - 19:04
9:30 - Tim Smith (1)		First overtime period		No scoring
Matt Hemingway (25 saves / 31 shots)		Goalie stats		Chris Kamal (9 saves / 13 shots); Robert Tadazak (15 saves / 18 shots)

April 3	Owatonna Express	2 – 3	Alexandria Blizzard	Shattuck St. Mary's Ice Arena
No scoring		First period	Mike Krieg (1) - pp - 12:41
0:39 - Zach Vierling (1); 11:51 - pp - Marian Fiala (1)		Second period	Zach Fulton (1) - pp - 9:19
No scoring		Third period	Billy Miller (1) - 3:16
Matt Hemingway (33 saves / 36 shots)		Goalie stats	Robert Tadazak (23 saves / 25 shots)

April 9	Alexandria Blizzard	6 – 2	Owatonna Express	Runestone Community Center
7:34 - Alex Altenbernd (2)		First period	No scoring
0:37 - Brett Wall (1); 5:02 - Brett Wall (2); 11:53 - pp - Alex Altenbernd (3)		Second period	Brian McGinty (1) - 5:47
2:25 - pp - Alex Altenbernd (4); 8:55 - Steve Zierke (1)		Third period	Jacob Sloat (2) - 18:51
Robert Tadazak (21 saves / 23 shots)		Goalie stats	Matt Hemingway (35 saves / 41 shots); Michael Webb (3 saves / 3 shots)

April 10	Alexandria Blizzard	5 – 2	Owatonna Express	Runestone Community Center
Steve Zierke (2) - 6:18		First period	7:27 - Dan Cecka (2)
Simon Cederborg-Nilsson (2) - pp - 7:39		Second period	15:08 - Zachary Vierling (1)
Alex Altenbernd (5) - pp - 14:22; Steve Zierke (3) - 15:51; Nick Nagel (1) - 18:41		Third period	No scoring
Robert Tadazak (24 saves / 26 shots)		Goalie stats	Matt Hemingway (30 saves / 35 shots)

Alexandria wins series 3 – 1

=== North Division ===
==== (N1) Marquette Rangers vs. (N4) Motor City Machine ====
April 2	Marquette Rangers	2 – 5	Motor City Machine	Lakeview Arena
8:07 - pp - Tanner Kero (1)		First period	Eric Millisor (1) - 3:59; John Scorcia (1) - pp - 8:07
No scoring		Second period	R. Anthony Coles (1) - 8:54; R.J. Kleiman (1) - 11:53
3:37 - Bobby Bodette (1)		Third period	Steve Brancheau (1) - sh - 11:57
Lukas Hafner (19 saves / 24 shots)		Goalie stats	Phillip Graveline (40 saves / 42 shots)

April 3	Marquette Rangers	1 – 2	Motor City Machine	Lakeview Arena
No scoring		First period	No scoring
8:40 - Josh Bussell (1)		Second period	No scoring
No scoring		Third period	John Scorcia (2) - pp - 14:00; R. Anthony Coles (2) - pp - 15:20
Lukas Hafner (32 saves / 34 shots)		Goalie stats	Jason Torf (44 saves / 45 shots)

April 8	Motor City Machine	4 – 3	3OT	Marquette Rangers	Yack Arena
No scoring		First period		No scoring
2:50 - R.J. Kleiman (2)		Second period		Scott Henegar (1) - 10:19
1:00 - John Scorcia (3); 11:50 - Patrick Sullivan (1)		Third period		Andrew Kolb (1) - 8:13; Austin Accettura (1) - 14:20
6:37 - R.J. Kleiman (3)		Third overtime period		No scoring
Phillip Graveline (47 saves / 50 shots)		Goalie stats		Lukas Hafner (80 saves / 84 shots)

Motor City wins series 3 – 0

==== (N2) Traverse City North Stars vs. (N3) Janesville Jets ====
April 2	Traverse City North Stars	7 –1	Janesville Jets	Molon Rink
1:24 - Kyle Jean (1)		First period	Derek Jacobson (1) - 8:16
10:11 - Dan Radke (1); 13:42 - Chris Salomone (1); 14:31 - Tim Opie (1); 15:28 - Dan Radke (2)		Second period	No scoring
4:33 - Phil Wendecker (1); 17:22 - Eric Rivard (1)		Third period	No scoring
Drew Strandberg (25 saves / 26 shots)		Goalie stats	Matt Wichorek (28 saves / 35 shots)

April 3	Traverse City North Stars	4 – 0	Janesville Jets	Molon Rink
4:27 - Garrett Thompson (1); 8:20 - Garrett Thompson (2)		First period	No scoring
No scoring		Second period	No scoring
14:53 - Eric McLintock (1); 17:50 - Bo Jacobs (1)		Third period	No scoring
Drew Strandberg (18 saves / 18 shots)		Goalie stats	Matt Wichorek (33 saves / 37 shots)

April 9	Janesville Jets	0 – 2	Traverse City North Stars	Janesville Ice Arena
No scoring		First period	Dan Radke (3) - pp - 5:55
No scoring		Second period	No scoring
No scoring		Third period	Kelin Ainsworth (1) - en - 19:11
Matt Wichorek (17 saves / 18 shots)		Goalie stats	Drew Strandberg (27 saves / 27 shots)

Traverse City wins series 3 – 0

=== South Division ===
==== (S1) Topeka RoadRunners vs. (S4) Springfield Jr. Blues ====
April 2	Topeka RoadRunners	1 – 4	Springfield Jr. Blues	Kansas Expocentre
No scoring		First period	Jared Rickord (1) - 10:44
13:22 - Edgars Lipsbergs (1)		Second period	Ross Andersen (1) - 16:31
No scoring		Third period	Joe Purull (1) - 6:09; Trent Frey (1) - pp - 10:51
Evan Karambelas (11 saves / 15 shots)		Goalie stats	Andrew Martin (42 saves / 43 shots)

April 3	Topeka RoadRunners	7 – 2	Springfield Jr. Blues	Kansas Expocentre
2:38 - Jeff Burke (1); 7:07 - Michael Hill (1); 12:20 - Justin Kovacs (1)		First period	Jared Rickord (2) - 3:03
3:56 - Edgars Lipsbergs (2); 4:20 - Kevin Ryan (1); 9:14 - Bryce Johnson (1)		Second period	Ross Andersen (2) - 5:17
19:20 - Cole Schneider (1)		Third period	No scoring
Eric Rohrkemper (16 saves / 18 shots)		Goalie stats	Andrew Martin (53 saves / 60 shots)

April 9	Springfield Jr. Blues	1 – 8	Topeka RoadRunners	Nelson Center
No scoring		First period	Edgars Lipsbergs (3) - 4:25; Justin Kovacs (2) - 5:24
No scoring		Second period	Alec Hagaman (1) - pp - 17:54
7:21 - Nick Curry (1)		Third period	Tony Thomas (1) - 1:09; Bryce Johnson (2) - 4:56; Cole Schneider (2) - 12:02; Cole Schneider (3) - pp - 13:51; Michael Hill (2) - 15:58
Andrew Martin (24 saves / 31 shots); Tanner Milliron (0 saves / 1 shot)		Goalie stats	Eric Rohrkemper (22 saves / 23 shots)

April 10	Springfield Jr. Blues	3 – 4	Topeka RoadRunners	Nelson Center
15:05 - pp - Randy Cure (1)		First period	No scoring
No scoring		Second period	Tony Thomas (2) - sh - 1:13; Cole Schneider (4) - 11:54
5:19 - Michael Schaber (1); 19:26 - Kevin O'Donnell (1)		Third period	Cole Schneider (5) - 4:53; Cole Schneider (6) - 5:44
Andrew Martin (28 saves / 32 shots)		Goalie stats	Evan Karambelas (35 saves / 38 shots)

Topeka wins series 3 – 1

==== (S2) St. Louis Bandits vs. (S3) Texas Tornado ====
April 2	St. Louis Bandits	2 – 3	Texas Tornado	Hardee's Iceplex
4:22 - Ryan Belonger (1); 9:53 - Brad Smith (1)		First period	J.D. Howard (1) - pp - 15:19
No scoring		Second period	Nick Taurence (1) - 3:27; J.D. Howard (2) - 19:57
No scoring		Third period	No scoring
Tyler Bruggeman (10 saves / 13 shots)		Goalie stats	Dan Sullivan (40 saves / 42 shots)

April 3	St. Louis Bandits	1 – 3	Texas Tornado	Hardee's Iceplex
No scoring		First period	No scoring
No scoring		Second period	J.D. Howard (3) - pp - 8:16; Shane Sooth (1) - 11:13
12:41 - Daniel Olszewski (1)		Third period	Jack Prince (1) - en - 19:16
C.J. Groh (17 saves / 19 shots)		Goalie stats	Dan Sullivan (36 saves / 37 shots)

April 7	Texas Tornado	0 – 1	St. Louis Bandits	Deja Blue Arena
No scoring		First period	No scoring
No scoring		Second period	Cody Ganchar (1) - 2:29
No scoring		Third period	No scoring
Dan Sullivan (21 saves / 22 shots)		Goalie stats	Tyler Bruggeman (27 saves / 27 shots)

April 8	Texas Tornado	2 – 3	3OT	St. Louis Bandits	Deja Blue Arena
No scoring		First period		Joe Kalisz (1) - 3:04
5:38 - Axel Boyer (1)		Second period		Ryan Belonger (2) - 5:03
3:58 - Justin Jones (1)		Third period		No scoring
No scoring		Third overtime period		Joe Kalisz (2) - 13:47
Dan Sullivan (51 saves / 54 shots)		Goalie stats		Tyler Bruggeman (45 saves / 47 shots)

April 10	St. Louis Bandits	3 – 2	OT	Texas Tornado	Hardee's Iceplex
4:26 - Chris Ciotti (1)		First period		Justin Jones (2) - 8:48
No scoring		Second period		No scoring
19:48 - Jordan Bourgonje (1)		Third period		Ian Braun (1) - 15:16
10:38 - Grant Gettinger (1)		First overtime period		No scoring
Tyler Bruggeman (17 saves / 19 shots)		Goalie stats		Dan Sullivan (37 saves / 40 shots)

St. Louis wins series 3 – 2

=== West Division ===
==== (W1) Wenatchee Wild vs. (W4) Kenai River Brown Bears ====
April 2	Wenatchee Wild	5 – 2	Kenai River Brown Bears	Town Toyota Center
7:02 - Ryan Timar (1); 16:49 - Eric Johnson (1)		First period	No scoring
0:44 - pp - Nathan Sliwinski (1)		Second period	Doug Beck (1) - 11:16
0:34 - Dajon Mingo (1); 3:04 - Ryan Timar (2)		Third period	Matthew Cinader (1) - 5:40
Brandon Jaeger (16 saves / 18 shots)		Goalie stats	Michael Martin (26 saves / 31 shots); Dainis Vasiljevs (5 saves / 5 shots)

April 3	Wenatchee Wild	5 – 2	Kenai River Brown Bears	Town Toyota Center
16:34 - sh - Christian Hilbrich (1)		First period	Brad Duwe (1) - pp - 18:04
3:39 - Dajon Mingo (2); 19:18 - pp - Ryan Timar (3)		Second period	Josh Royston (1) - pp - 15:37
11:54 - Michael Di Puma (1); 17:58 - sh - Shawn Pauly (1)		Third period	No scoring
Brandon Jaeger (15 saves / 17 shots)		Goalie stats	Dainis Vasiljevs (29 saves / 33 shots)

April 4	Wenatchee Wild	3 – 1	Kenai River Brown Bears	Town Toyota Center
No scoring		First period	No scoring
Nolan Youngmun (1) - 8:48; Nolan Youngmun (2) - sh - 15:31		Second period	No scoring
Eric Johnson (2) - pp - 1:30		Third period	16:17 - Brad Fusaro (1)
Brendan Jensen (19 saves / 20 shots)		Goalie stats	Josh Benton (37 saves / 40 shots)

Wenatchee wins series 3 – 0

==== (W2) Alaska Avalanche vs. (W3) Fairbanks Ice Dogs ====
April 2	Alaska Avalanche	1 – 2	OT	Fairbanks Ice Dogs	Curtis D. Menard Memorial Sports Center
No scoring		First period		No scoring
No scoring		Second period		Aaron McGill (1) - 16:19
19:19 - Zach Smith (1)		Third period		No scoring
No scoring		First overtime period		Matt Millis (1) - pp - 0:43
Landon Peterson (25 saves / 27 shots)		Goalie stats		Joe Phillippi (29 saves / 30 shots)

April 3	Alaska Avalanche	4 – 6	Fairbanks Ice Dogs	Curtis D. Menard Memorial Sports Center
No scoring		First period	Matt Millis (2) - pp - 17:38
5:47 - pp - Blake Huppert (1)		Second period	Mark Pustin (1) - 0:59; George Michalke (1) - pp - 4:13; Aaron McGill (2) - pp - 13:50; Joe Krause (1) - 14:12
1:28 - Seth Johnson (1); 9:03 - Jed McGlasson (1); 10:16 - Blake Huppert (2)		Third period	Michael Juola (1) - 5:21
Landon Peterson (30 saves / 36 shots)		Goalie stats	Joe Phillippi (30 saves / 34 shots)

April 9	Fairbanks Ice Dogs	4 – 2	Alaska Avalanche	Big Dipper Ice Arena
9:14 - Pete Spratte (1)		First period	Logan Maly (1) - 10:07; Kyle Pichler (1) - pp - 18:35
4:22 - sh - Will Aide (1); 17:38 - Mark Pustin (2)		Second period	No scoring
19:32 - en - Matt Millis (3)		Third period	No scoring
Joe Phillippi (23 saves / 25 shots)		Goalie stats	Kale Robertson (32 saves / 35 shots)

Fairbanks wins series 3 – 0

== Division Finals ==
=== Central Division ===
==== (C1) Bismarck Bobcats vs. (C4) Alexandria Blizzard ====
April 16	Bismarck Bobcats	9 – 1	Alexandria Blizzard	V.F.W. Sports Center
7:31 - Jason Fabian (3); 9:54 - pp - Dominic Panetta (4); 18:27 - Ryan Jacobson (5); 19:46 - pp - Dominic Panetta (5)		First period	No scoring
15:31 - pp - Casey Kleisinger (2)		Second period	Steve Zierke (4) - pp - 1:51
16:26 - pp - Brett Bower (1); 16:51 - pp - Matt Shost (1); 18:19 - pp - Aaron Quick (3); 19:18 - pp - Sean McKenzie (2)		Third period	No scoring
Jake Williams (22 saves / 23 shots)		Goalie stats	Chris Kamal (12 saves / 17 shots); Robert Tadazak (23 saves / 27 shots)

April 17	Bismarck Bobcats	5 – 2	Alexandria Blizzard	V.F.W. Sports Center
5:39 - Sean McKenzie (2); 15:18 - pp - Sam Rendle (2)		First period	Nardo Nagtzaam (2) - 18:06
No scoring		Second period	Simon Cederborg-Nilsson (3) - pp - 13:05
8:24 - Tyler Klein (2); 8:54 - Gavin Hartzog (1); 12:06 - pp - Jason Fabian (4)		Third period	No scoring
Jake Williams (23 saves / 25 shots)		Goalie stats	Robert Tadazak (22 saves / 27 shots)

April 23	Alexandria Blizzard	1 – 3	Bismarck Bobcats	Runestone Community Center
No scoring		First period	No scoring
No scoring		Second period	Trent Johnson (2) - 15:22; Ryan Jacobson (6) - 19:27
15:59 - Nardo Nagtzaam (3)		Third period	Casey Kleisinger (4) - 11:27
Chris Kamal (32 saves / 35 shots)		Goalie stats	Ryan Faragher (31 saves / 32 shots)

Bismarck wins series 3 – 0

=== North Division ===
==== (N2) Traverse City North Stars vs. (N4) Motor City Machine ====
April 16	Traverse City North Stars	4 – 1	Motor City Machine	Molon Rink
19:26 - pp - Andy Huff (1)		First period	No scoring
6:20 - Kelin Ainsworth (2); 15:02 - Garrett Thompson (3)		Second period	No scoring
4:40 - Nilan Nagy (1)		Third period	Andrew Graves (1) - 11:06
Drew Strandberg (26 saves / 27 shots)		Goalie stats	Phillip Graveline (34 saves / 38 shots)

April 17	Traverse City North Stars	5 – 1	Motor City Machine	Molon Rink
5:46 - Alec Shields (1)		First period	John Scorcia (4) - 11:28
2:17 - pp - Garrett Thompson (4); 4:49 - Tim Opie (2); 18:33 - pp - Dan Radke (4)		Second period	No scoring
12:02 - pp - Phil Wendecker (2)		Third period	No scoring
Drew Strandberg (14 saves / 15 shots)		Goalie stats	Jason Torf (38 saves / 43 shots)

April 23	Motor City Machine	3 – 5	Traverse City North Stars	Yack Arena
No scoring		First period	Chris Salomone (2) - 12:50; Tim Opie (3) - 14:10
6:36 - R. Anthony Coles (3); 17:41 - pp - R.J. Kleiman (4)		Second period	Doug Clifford (1) - 4:34; Kyle Jean (2) - 11:40; Garrett Thompson (5) - 18:13
14:40 - pp - Mike Monfredo (1)		Third period	No scoring
Phillip Graveline (25 saves / 30 shots); Jason Torf (8 saves / 8 shots)		Goalie stats	Drew Strandberg (27 saves / 30 shots)

Traverse City wins series 3 – 0

=== South Division ===
==== (S1) Topeka RoadRunners vs. (S2) St. Louis Bandits ====
April 15	Topeka RoadRunners	1 – 2	St. Louis Bandits	Kansas Expocentre
4:29 - Edgars Lipsbergs (4)		First period	Ryan Belonger (3) - pp - 11:35
No scoring		Second period	Brooks Bertsch (1) - 13:59
No scoring		Third period	No scoring
Eric Rohrkemper (14 saves / 16 shots)		Goalie stats	Tyler Bruggeman (24 saves / 25 shots)

April 16	Topeka RoadRunners	6 – 2	St. Louis Bandits	Kansas Expocentre
5:57 - Justin Kovacs (3); 14:54 - pp - Michael Hill (2); 19:25 - Bryce Johnson (3)		First period	Chris Ciotti (2) - 4:16
17:00 - Cole Schneider (7)		Second period	No scoring
8:51 - pp - Bryce Johnson (4); 14:14 - pp - Edgars Lipsbergs (5)		Third period	Ryan Stouffer (1) - pp - 12:52
Eric Rohrkemper (18 saves / 20 shots)		Goalie stats	Tyler Bruggeman (15 saves / 19 shots); C.J. Groh (6 saves / 8 shots)

April 23	St. Louis Bandits	4 – 1	Topeka RoadRunners	Hardee's Iceplex
No scoring		First period	No scoring
1:30 - Daniel Olszewski (2); 8:58 - Joe Kalisz (3)		Second period	Bob Marx (1) - pp - 10:42
5:02 - Ryan Stouffer (2); 15:19 - Colton Hargrove (1)		Third period	No scoring
Tyler Bruggeman (29 saves / 30 shots)		Goalie stats	Eric Rohrkemper (27 saves / 31 shots)

April 24	St. Louis Bandits	1 – 4	Topeka RoadRunners	Hardee's Iceplex
No scoring		First period	No scoring
No scoring		Second period	No scoring
12:50 - pp - Brooks Bertsch (2)		Third period	Tony Thomas (3) - sh - 5:12; Bryce Johnson (4) - 13:41; Tony Thomas (4) - pp - 18:13; Alec Hagaman (2) - en - 19:31
Tyler Bruggeman (33 saves / 36 shots)		Goalie stats	Eric Rohrkemper (28 saves / 29 shots)

April 26	Topeka RoadRunners	0 – 5	St. Louis Bandits	Kansas Expocentre
No scoring		First period	Craig Kitto (1) - 9:41
No scoring		Second period	Brooks Bertsch (3) - pp - 6:17; Colton Hargrove (2) - pp - 15:06; C.J. Eick (1) - 16:14; Ryan Stouffer (3) - pp - 17:19
No scoring		Third period	No scoring
Eric Rohrkemper (14 saves / 18 shots); Cooper Frederick (9 saves / 10 shots)		Goalie stats	Tyler Bruggeman (24 saves / 24 shots)

St. Louis wins series 3 – 2

=== West Division ===
==== (W1) Wenatchee Wild vs. (W3) Fairbanks Ice Dogs ====
April 16	Wenatchee Wild	6 – 2	Fairbanks Ice Dogs	Town Toyota Center
4:46 - Brandon Burrell (1); 11:40 - pp - Ryan Timar (4); 18:02 - pp - Alex McLean (1)		First period	No scoring
17:42 - pp - Ryan Timar (5)		Second period	No scoring
4:03 - Armand de Swardt (1); 13:38 - en - Christian Hilbrich (2)		Third period	Mark Pustin (3) - pp - 7:49; Matt Millis (4) - pp - 11:12
Brandon Jaeger (17 saves / 19 shots)		Goalie stats	Joe Phillippi (5 saves / 8 shots); Mike Taffe (31 saves / 33 shots)

April 17	Wenatchee Wild	6 – 2	Fairbanks Ice Dogs	Town Toyota Center
14:36 - pp - Armand de Swardt (2)		First period	Zach Tolkinen (1) - 7:17
2:33 - Mark Miller (1); 10:52 - Armand de Swardt (3); 19:16 - Alex McLean (2)		Second period	No scoring
0:09 - Jeff Jubinville (1); 6:21 - sh - en - Alex McLean (3)		Third period	James Saintey (1) - 4:19
Brandon Jaeger (12 saves / 14 shots)		Goalie stats	Mike Taffe (31 saves / 36 shots)

April 23	Fairbanks Ice Dogs	1 – 7	Wenatchee Wild	Big Dipper Ice Arena
No scoring		First period	Brandon Burrell (2) - 13:42
No scoring		Second period	Ryan Timar (6) - 1:04; Michael Di Puma (2) - 6:54; Armand de Swardt (4) - 8:03; Andrew Christ (1) - 11:44
6:22 - pp - George Michalke (2)		Third period	Kyle Brodie (1) - 3:35; Michael Di Puma (3) - pp - 15:28
Joe Phillippi (18 saves / 24 shots); Mike Taffe (8 saves / 9 shots)		Goalie stats	Brandon Jaeger (12 saves / 13 shots); James Adamo (1 save / 1 shot)

Wenatchee wins series 3 – 0

== Semifinal ==
=== May 4 ===
St. Louis Bandits	3 – 5	Bismarck Bobcats	Town Toyota Center
Craig Kitto (2) - pp - 11:37	First period	5:58 - pp - Sean McKenzie (3)
No scoring	Second period	3:59 - Sam Rendle (3); 8:42 - Sam Rendle (4); 18:48 - pp - Dominic Panetta (6)
Craig Kitto (3) - 5:09; Cody Ganchar (2) - 19:25	Third period	16:18 - pp - Sam Rendle (5)
Tyler Bruggeman (28 saves / 33 shots)	Goalie stats	Ryan Faragher (26 saves / 29 shots)

Wenatchee Wild	4 – 5	Traverse City North Stars	Town Toyota Center
4:08 - Mark Miller (2); Nathan Sliwinski (2)	First period	Andy Huff (2) - 5:33; Garrett Thompson (6) - pp - 13:14
14:25 - Dajon Mingo (3)	Second period	Eric McLintock (2) - pp - 0:58
17:37 - Michael Di Puma (4)	Third period	Dan Radke (5) - pp - 10:34; Christopher Heineman (1) - 19:26
Brandon Jaeger (22 saves / 27 shots)	Goalie stats	Drew Strandberg (22 saves / 25 shots); Chris Paliafito (13 saves / 14 shots)

=== May 5 ===
St. Louis Bandits	4 – 1	Traverse City North Stars	Town Toyota Center
12:27 - pp - Patrick Raley (1)	First period	Kelin Ainsworth (3) - 11:25
1:04 - pp - Brooks Bertsch (4); 17:52 - pp - Ryan Stouffer (4)	Second period	No scoring
15:10 - pp - Daniel Olszewski (3)	Third period	No scoring
Tyler Bruggeman (20 saves / 21 shots)	Goalie stats	Drew Strandberg (27 saves / 30 shots); Chris Paliafito (8 saves / 9 shots)

Wenatchee Wild	2 – 3	Fairbanks Ice Dogs	Town Toyota Center
No scoring	First period	Sean O'Rourke (1) - 14:07
No scoring	Second period	Brock Carlston (1) - 4:09; Tyler Voigt (1) - 5:16
3:44 - Mark Miller (2); 18:24 - Dajon Mingo (4)	Third period	No scoring
Brandon Jaeger (12 saves / 15 shots); Brendan Jensen (7 saves / 7 shots)	Goalie stats	Joe Phillippi (50 saves / 52 shots)

=== May 6 ===
St. Louis Bandits	3 – 4	Fairbanks Ice Dogs	Town Toyota Center
19:12 - Craig Kitto (4)	First period	Brock Carlston (2) - 2:11
0:42 - Joe Kalisz (4); 18:07 - pp - Chris Ciotti (3)	Second period	Tyler Voigt (2) - 16:57
No scoring	Third period	Tyler Voigt (3) - pp - 7:56
Tyler Bruggeman (18 saves / 22 shots)	Goalie stats	Joe Phillippi (23 saves / 26 shots)

Bismarck Bobcats	6 – 1	Traverse City North Stars	Town Toyota Center
2:12 - pp - Dan Weissenhofer (1); 8:43 - Gavin Hartzog (2); 16:02 - Ryan Jacobson (7)	First period	No scoring
4:52 - pp - Nicholas Jensen (1); 14:13 - pp - Jason Fabian (5)	Second period	Doug Clifford (2) - 15:49
12:38 - Casey Kleisinger (4)	Third period	No scoring
Ryan Faragher (20 saves / 21 shots)	Goalie stats	Chris Paliafito (24 saves / 30 shots)

=== May 7 ===
Traverse City North Stars	2 – 1	Fairbanks Ice Dogs	Town Toyota Center
16:41 - pp - Travis White (1)	First period	No scoring
No scoring	Second period	No scoring
3:01 - Kyle Jean (3)	Third period	George Michalke III (3) - 6:12
Drew Strandberg (22 saves / 23 shots)	Goalie stats	Joe Phillippi (26 saves / 28 shots)

Wenatchee Wild	2 – 1	Bismarck Bobcats	Town Toyota Center
No scoring	First period	No scoring
6:39 - pp - Jeff Jubinville (2); 16:12 - pp - Jeff Jubinville (3)	Second period	No scoring
No scoring	Third period	Sam Rendle (6) - pp - 11:47
Brendan Jensen (39 saves / 40 shots)	Goalie stats	Jake Williams (38 saves / 40 shots)

=== May 8 ===
Fairbanks Ice Dogs	4 – 3	Bismarck Bobcats	Town Toyota Center
Mark Pustin (4) - 1:09	First period	3:19 - Aaron Quick (4); 6:43 - Trent Johnson (3)
Zach Tolkinen (2) - pp - 3:37; Kyle Politz (1) - pp - 12:51	Second period	1:02 - Tim Serratore (3)
Jared Larson (2) - sh - 6:55	Third period	No scoring
Joe Phillippi (30 saves / 33 shots)	Goalie stats	Jake Williams (30 saves / 34 shots)

Wenatchee Wild	5 – 4	OT	St. Louis Bandits	Town Toyota Center
No scoring	First period		Ryan Stouffer (5) - 14:06
1:39 - Dajon Mingo (5); 9:36 - sh - Dajon Mingo (6)	Second period		Ryan Stouffer (6) - 3:21
2:50 - Jeff Jubinville (4); 8:58 - Christian Hilbrich (3)	Third period		Patrick Sheehan (1) - 8:04; Ryan Belonger (4) - pp - 15:58
7:51 - pp - Armand de Swardt (5)	First overtime period		No scoring
Brendan Jensen (32 saves / 36 shots)	Goalie stats		C.J. Groh (34 saves / 39 shots)

== Robertson Cup Final ==
=== (C1) Bismarck Bobcats vs. (W3) Fairbanks Ice Dogs ===
May 9	Bismarck Bobcats	3 – 0	Fairbanks Ice Dogs	Town Toyota Center
17:10 - Casey Kleisinger (5)		First period	No scoring
17:50 - sh - Jason Fabian (6)		Second period	No scoring
18:11 - en - Sean McKenzie (5)		Third period	No scoring
Ryan Faragher (21 saves / 21 shots)		Goalie stats	Joe Phillippi (26 saves / 28 shots)
