= Tanner Kero =

American professional ice hockey player (born 1992)

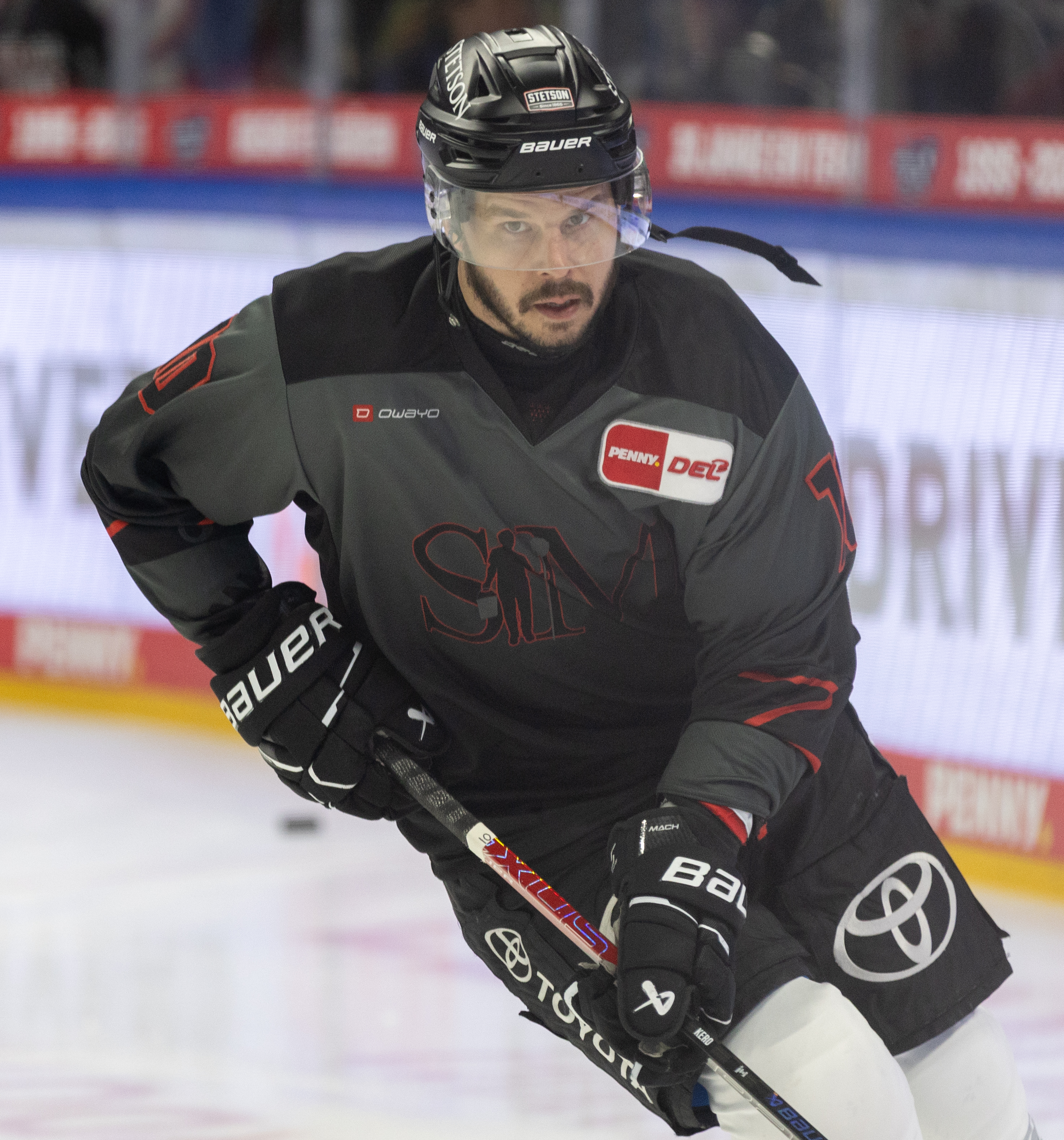
- Kero with the Kölner Haie in 2026
- Born: July 24, 1992 (age 34) Hancock, Michigan, U.S.
- Height: 6 ft 0 in (183 cm)
- Weight: 185 lb (84 kg; 13 st 3 lb)
- Position: Center
- Shoots: Left
- DEL team Former teams: Kölner Haie; Chicago Blackhawks; Dallas Stars; HV71
- NHL draft: Undrafted
- Playing career: 2015–present

Tanner James Kero (born July 24, 1992) is an American professional ice hockey player currently playing for the Kölner Haie of the Deutsche Eishockey Liga (DEL).

== Playing career ==
=== Amateur ===
Prior to his collegiate hockey career, Kero played for the Marquette Rangers in the NAHL where he led the league in goals (with 32) and was named the league's "Rookie of the Year". He also played for the Fargo Force in the USHL where he posted 13 goals, 24 assists and 37 points in 55 games and earned a spot on the USHL Western Conference All-Star Team.

Prior to turning professional, Kero attended Michigan Technological University where he played four seasons of NCAA Division I hockey with the Michigan Tech Huskies, where he registered 55 goals, 56 assists, 111 points, and 67 penalty minutes in 153 games. In his senior year, Kero's outstanding play was recognized with numerous awards including being selected as the 2014–15 WCHA Player of the Year and being named to the 2014–15 NCAA (West) First All-American Team.

=== Professional ===
On April 2, 2015, the Chicago Blackhawks of the National Hockey League (NHL) signed Kero to a two-year entry-level contract. He began the 2015–16 season assigned to AHL affiliate, the Rockford IceHogs. On October 27, 2015, the Blackhawks recalled him to the NHL. He made his NHL debut on October 29, 2015, in a 3–1 loss to the Winnipeg Jets. Just 4 games later, he scored his first NHL goal on November 6, shooting past Cory Schneider, in a 4–2 loss against the New Jersey Devils. On March 23, 2017, the Blackhawks signed Kero to a two-year contract extension.

On June 24, 2018, Kero was traded to the Vancouver Canucks in exchange for Michael Chaput.

On July 1, 2019, having left the Canucks as a free agent, Kero was signed to a two-year, two-way contract with the Dallas Stars on July 1, 2019.

Following four seasons within the Stars organization, Kero as a free agent was signed to a one-year AHL contract for the 2023–24 season with the Colorado Eagles, affiliate to the Colorado Avalanche, on July 18, 2023.

Upon completion of his contract with the Eagles, Kero left North America after 10 professional seasons and signed his first contract abroad in agreeing to a one-year deal with Swedish club, HV71 of the Swedish Hockey League (SHL), on July 5, 2024. In his lone season in Jönköping in 2024–25, Kero featured in every game in a top nine forward role posting 9 goals and 13 assists for 22 points. Helping the club avoid relegation to the Allsvenskan in a play-out series, Kero left HV71 at the conclusion of the season.

== Personal life ==
Kero was born in Hancock, Michigan and is the son of Dale and Joan Kero. He has five sisters (one of them, Jordanna played for the Michigan Tech volleyball team) and four brothers; three of them: Dawson, Devin and Hunter play hockey as well. While attending Michigan Tech, Kero had a grade point average of 3.68 in mathematics.

== Career statistics ==
			Regular season					Playoffs
Season	Team	League	GP	G	A	Pts	PIM	GP	G	A	Pts	PIM
2008–09	Hancock High School	HSMI		38	31	69		—	—	—	—	—
2009–10	Marquette Rangers	NAHL	57	32	19	51	39	3	1	0	1	0
2010–11	Fargo Force	USHL	55	14	23	37	22	5	1	0	1	2
2011–12	Michigan Tech University	WCHA	39	9	7	16	14	—	—	—	—	—
2012–13	Michigan Tech University	WCHA	33	11	13	24	27	—	—	—	—	—
2013–14	Michigan Tech University	WCHA	40	15	10	25	16	—	—	—	—	—
2014–15	Michigan Tech University	WCHA	41	20	26	46	10	—	—	—	—	—
2014–15	Rockford IceHogs	AHL	6	5	0	5	0	6	2	1	3	0
2015–16	Rockford IceHogs	AHL	60	20	19	39	23	3	0	2	2	0
2015–16	Chicago Blackhawks	NHL	17	1	2	3	2	—	—	—	—	—
2016–17	Rockford IceHogs	AHL	28	7	13	20	14	—	—	—	—	—
2016–17	Chicago Blackhawks	NHL	47	6	10	16	8	4	0	0	0	0
2017–18	Chicago Blackhawks	NHL	8	1	2	3	0	—	—	—	—	—
2017–18	Rockford IceHogs	AHL	36	8	12	20	8	12	0	3	3	8
2018–19	Utica Comets	AHL	67	24	33	57	37	—	—	—	—	—
2019–20	Texas Stars	AHL	49	8	25	33	20	—	—	—	—	—
2020–21	Dallas Stars	NHL	39	3	7	10	6	—	—	—	—	—
2021–22	Dallas Stars	NHL	23	0	3	3	0	—	—	—	—	—
2021–22	Texas Stars	AHL	28	5	12	17	10	2	0	0	0	0
2022–23	Texas Stars	AHL	69	17	33	50	40	8	1	4	5	0
2023–24	Colorado Eagles	AHL	59	12	21	33	24	3	1	1	2	0
2024–25	HV71	SHL	52	9	13	22	14	—	—	—	—	—
NHL totals			134	11	24	35	16	4	0	0	0	0

== Awards and honors ==
Award	Year
NAHL Rookie of the Year	2009–10
WCHA Scoring Champion (46 points)	2014–15
WCHA Outstanding Student-Athlete of the Year	2014–15
All-WCHA First Team	2014–15
WCHA Player of the Year	2014–15
NCAA (West) First All-American Team	2014–15
Hobey Baker Award Finalist	2014–15

Awards and achievements
Preceded by Cody Kunyk	WCHA Player of the Year; 2014–15	Succeeded by Alex Petan
Preceded by Cody Kunyk	WCHA Scoring leader 2014–15	Succeeded by Alex Petan
Preceded by Chad Brears	WCHA Outstanding Student-Athlete of the Year; 2014–15	Succeeded by Jamie Phillips
