= Karvinen =

Karvinen is a Finnish surname. Notable people with the surname include:

- Eetu Karvinen (born 1993), Finnish ice hockey player
- Michelle Karvinen (born 1990), Danish-Finnish ice hockey player
- Shirly Karvinen (born 1993), Miss Finland 2016
