= Kervinen =

Kervinen is a Finnish surname. Notable people with the surname include:

- Olli Kervinen (1924–1997), Finnish farmer and politician
- Esa Kervinen (1929–2016), Finnish sport shooter
- Jani Kervinen (born 1983), Finnish electronic music producer
