= Nicholas Jensen =

Danish ice hockey player (born 1989)

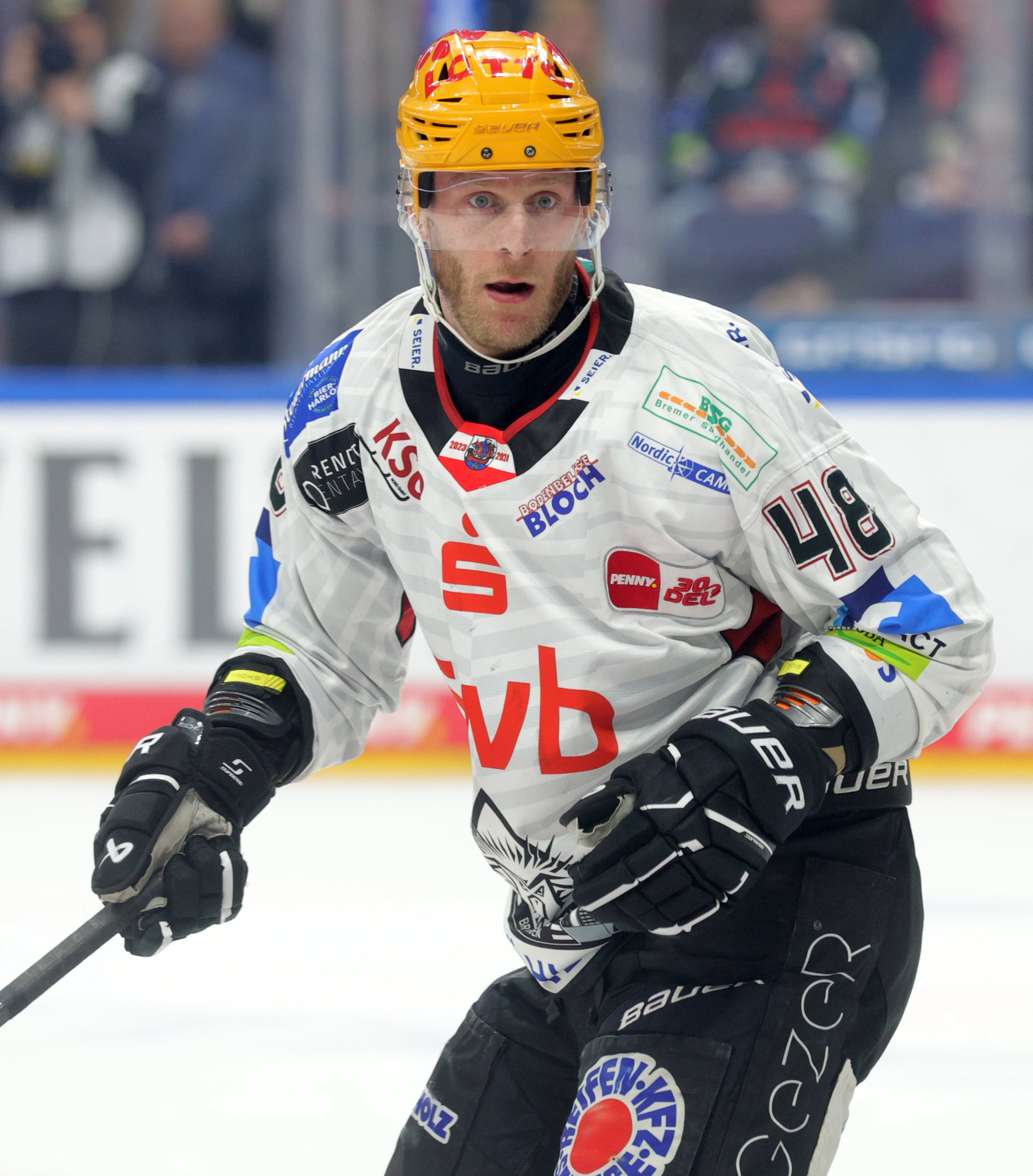
- Jensen with the Fischtown Pinguins in 2024
- Born: 8 April 1989 (age 37) Copenhagen, Denmark
- Height: 6 ft 2 in (188 cm)
- Weight: 225 lb (102 kg; 16 st 1 lb)
- Position: Defence/centre
- Shoots: Left
- DEL team Former teams: Fischtown Pinguins; Aalborg Pirates; Esbjerg Energy; Rungsted IK; Düsseldorfer EG; Eisbären Berlin
- National team: Denmark
- NHL draft: Undrafted
- Playing career: 2008–present

Nicholas B. Bernsdorf Jensen (born 8 April 1989) is a Danish professional ice hockey player who is a defenceman for Fischtown Pinguins of the Deutsche Eishockey Liga (DEL). He first played for the Danish national team at the 2015 World Championship.

== Playing career ==
Jensen played college hockey at SUNY Plattsburgh from 2010 to 2014. After spending one season with Rungsted IK in his native Denmark, Jensen left the Metal Ligaen after his third season in the league by signing a one-year deal with German club, Fischtown Pinguins of the DEL on 23 March 2017.

Jensen enjoyed two seasons with the Fischtown Pinguins before leaving following the 2018–19 season, continuing in the DEL by signing a one-year contract with Düsseldorfer EG on 10 April 2019. He joined Eisbären Berlin for their 2021 DEL championship year and then rejoined Fischtown Pinguins the following year.

Jensen played for the Denmark Olympic Men's Hockey Team in the 2026 Olympics and scored its second goal with 8:44 left to outscore the USA team 2-1 at the end of the first period in their strong game but ultimate 6-3 defeat against the USA in the Group C Preliminary Round on February 14, 2026.

== Career statistics ==
=== Regular season and playoffs ===
			Regular season					Playoffs
Season	Team	League	GP	G	A	Pts	PIM	GP	G	A	Pts	PIM
2005–06	Rögle BK	J18	9	6	4	10	—	—	—	—	—	—
2005–06	Rögle BK	J20	35	2	4	6	56	—	—	—	—	—
2006–07	Linköpings HC	J18 Allsv	6	2	1	3	6	—	—	—	—	—
2006–07	Linköpings HC	J20	35	4	3	7	24	—	—	—	—	—
2007–08	Linköpings HC	J18	1	1	1	2	0	—	—	—	—	—
2007–08	Linköpings HC	J20	41	12	10	22	114	5	1	2	3	2
2008–09	Bismarck Bobcats	NAHL	43	12	22	34	24	13	1	6	7	6
2009–10	Bismarck Bobcats	NAHL	49	12	27	39	79	10	1	3	4	8
2010–11	Plattsburgh State	SUNYAC	26	8	14	22	37	—	—	—	—	—
2011–12	Plattsburgh State	SUNYAC	27	10	10	20	32	—	—	—	—	—
2012–13	Plattsburgh State	SUNYAC	26	6	9	15	28	—	—	—	—	—
2013–14	Plattsburgh State	SUNYAC	16	2	9	11	10	—	—	—	—	—
2014–15	Aalborg Pirates	DEN	36	4	12	16	73	5	0	1	1	4
2015–16	Esbjerg Energy	DEN	33	3	10	13	75	19	1	8	9	12
2016–17	Rungsted Seier Capital	DEN	35	5	13	18	127	4	0	0	0	4
2017–18	Fischtown Penguins	DEL	50	2	6	8	90	6	1	1	2	8
2018–19	Fischtown Penguins	DEL	48	10	17	27	72	1	0	0	0	25
2019–20	Düsseldorfer EG	DEL	52	7	15	22	78	—	—	—	—	—
2020–21	Düsseldorfer EG	DEL	38	6	21	27	36	—	—	—	—	—
2021–22	Eisbären Berlin	DEL	48	2	11	13	44	10	0	1	1	29
2022–23	Fischtown Pinguins	DEL	40	5	13	18	31	—	—	—	—	—
2023–24	Fischtown Pinguins	DEL	48	5	22	27	52	14	0	14	14	12
2024–25	Fischtown Pinguins	DEL	40	4	27	31	43	6	1	2	3	4
DEN totals			104	12	35	47	275	28	1	9	10	20
DEL totals			364	41	132	173	446	37	2	18	20	78

=== International ===
Year	Team	Event	GP	G	A	Pts	PIM
2006	Denmark	U18 D1	5	2	1	3	10
2007	Denmark	U18 D1	5	3	2	5	10
2008	Denmark	WJC	4	0	0	0	4
2009	Denmark	WJC D1	5	0	2	2	16
2015	Denmark	WC	4	1	0	1	2
2016	Denmark	WC	8	0	0	0	4
2017	Denmark	WC	7	0	0	0	8
2018	Denmark	WC	7	0	0	0	0
2019	Denmark	WC	7	0	0	0	2
2021	Denmark	WC	4	0	1	1	0
2021	Denmark	OGQ	3	0	1	1	2
2022	Denmark	OG	5	0	2	2	6
2022	Denmark	WC	7	0	0	0	2
2024	Denmark	WC	7	0	2	2	12
2024	Denmark	OGQ	3	0	0	0	0
2025	Denmark	WC	5	0	0	0	4
2026	Denmark	OG	4	1	0	1	0
Junior totals			19	5	5	10	40
Senior totals			71	2	6	8	42

== Awards and honours ==
Award	Year
DEL
Champion (Eisbären Berlin)	2022
