= Cole Schneider =

American ice hockey player (born 1990)

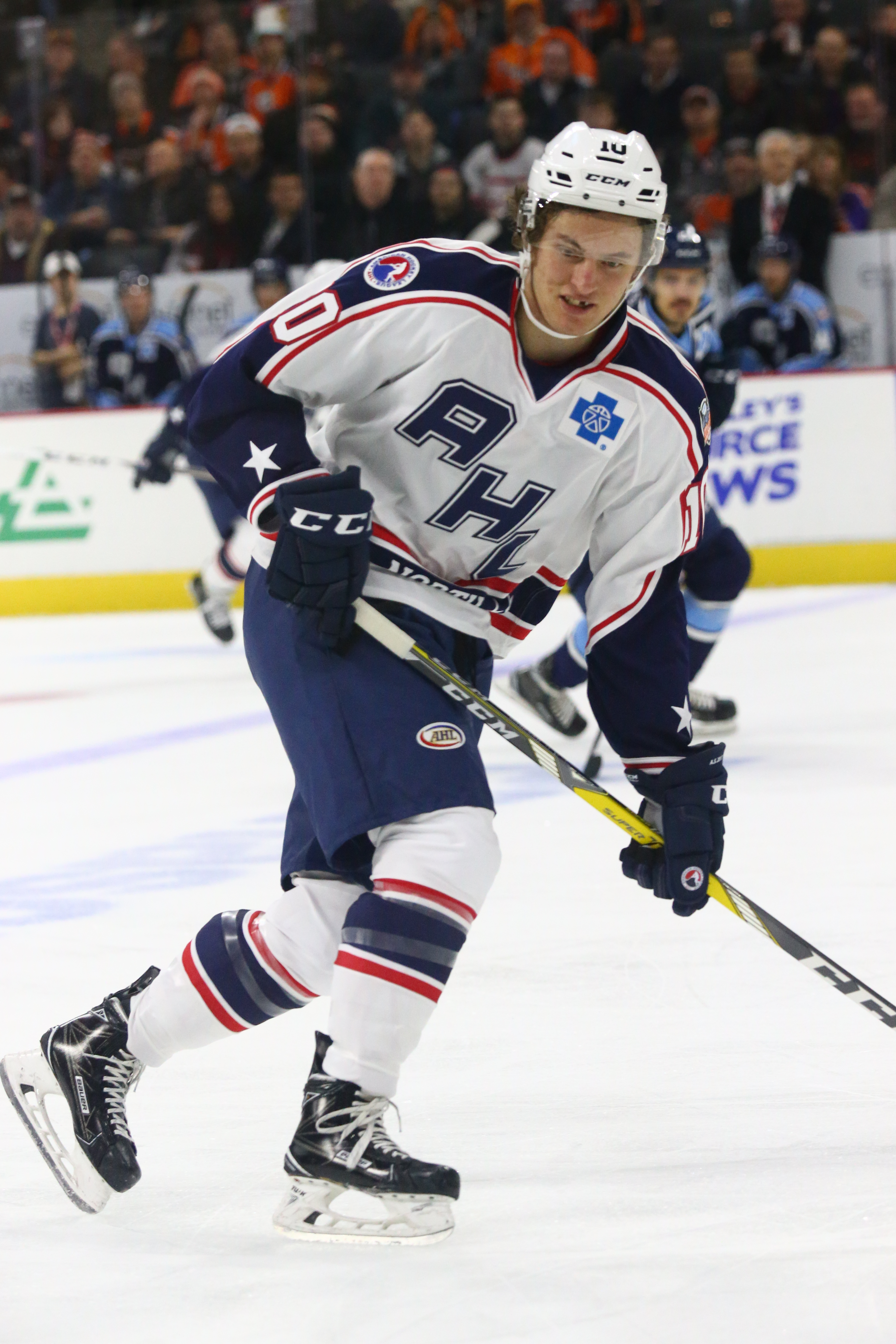
- Schneider at the 2017 AHL All-Star Challenge
- Born: August 26, 1990 (age 35) Williamsville, New York, U.S.
- Height: 6 ft 2 in (188 cm)
- Weight: 199 lb (90 kg; 14 st 3 lb)
- Position: Forward
- Shoots: Left
- EliteHockey Ligaen team Former teams: Storhamar; Buffalo Sabres
- NHL draft: Undrafted
- Playing career: 2012–present

Cole Schneider (born August 26, 1990) is an American professional ice hockey player who is currently under contract with Hockey Club Bolzano of the Ice Hockey League (ICE). After leaving the University of Connecticut in 2012, he began his professional career with the Binghamton Senators of the American Hockey League (AHL).

== Playing career ==
Schneider attended the University of Connecticut, where he played two seasons of college hockey under Bruce Marshall, with the NCAA Division I Huskies. In his freshman year, Schneider was selected to the All-AHA Rookie Team, and in his sophomore year his outstanding play was rewarded with a selection to the 2011–12 All-AHA First Team. Schneider posted 23 goals and 45 points in his sophomore season — both school records — and he became just the third University of Connecticut product to sign an NHL contract.

On March 14, 2012, the Ottawa Senators signed Schneider as a free agent to a two-year entry-level contract. Shortly after signing with Ottawa, Schneider made his professional debut with the American Hockey League's Binghamton Senators and subsequently recorded two assists in 11 games to close out the 2011–12 season.

On February 27, 2016, Schneider was traded by the Senators to the Buffalo Sabres as part of a seven-player deal. He spent the remainder of the season with the AHL's Rochester Americans before being called up by the Sabres and making his NHL debut on April 8, 2016.

On July 1, 2017, having left the Sabres as a free agent, Schneider agreed to a two-year, two-way contract with the New York Rangers. He was named the captain of the Hartford Wolf Pack ahead of the 2018–19 season. Schneider was second among the Wolf Pack in scoring with 25 points in 36 games, before he was traded by the Rangers to the Nashville Predators in exchange for Connor Brickley on January 14, 2019. He was immediately reassigned to continue in the AHL with the Milwaukee Admirals. Schneider adapted quickly with the Admirals, posting 22 points in the final 24 regular season games.

As a free agent, Schneider opted to remain with the Milwaukee Admirals, agreeing to a one-year AHL contract on July 2, 2019. In his second year with Milwaukee, Schneider placed second on the team in scoring with 18 goals and 46 points through 54 regular season games before the 2019–20 season was cancelled due to the COVID-19 pandemic.

With the Admirals opting out of play for the pandemic delayed 2020–21 season, Schneider as a free agent agreed to a one-year AHL contract with the Texas Stars, affiliate of the Dallas Stars, on January 23, 2021. He was named the Stars' team captain on February 4, 2021. Schneider finished third in team scoring posting 11 goals and 28 points through 38 regular season games.

On July 7, 2021, Schneider returned to the Milwaukee Admirals, agreeing to a one-year contract for the 2021–22 season.

Following his fourth season with the Admirals, Schneider left as a free agent and was signed to a one-year contract with independent AHL club, the Chicago Wolves, for the 2023–24 season on July 10, 2023.

After 12 professional seasons primarily in the minor-leagues, Schneider opted to sign his first contact abroad in agreeing to a one-year contract with Norwegian-based club, Storhamar Ishockey of the EHL, on August 5, 2024.

== Career statistics ==
			Regular season					Playoffs
Season	Team	League	GP	G	A	Pts	PIM	GP	G	A	Pts	PIM
2008–09	Mahoning Valley Phantoms	NAHL	42	17	16	33	12	14	3	7	10	2
2009–10	Topeka Roadrunners	NAHL	29	25	14	39	18	9	7	4	11	20
2010–11	University of Connecticut	AHA	37	13	20	33	30	—	—	—	—	—
2011–12	University of Connecticut	AHA	38	23	22	45	35	—	—	—	—	—
2011–12	Binghamton Senators	AHL	11	0	2	2	0	—	—	—	—	—
2012–13	Binghamton Senators	AHL	60	17	18	35	37	3	0	0	0	0
2013–14	Binghamton Senators	AHL	69	20	34	54	22	4	0	2	2	0
2014–15	Binghamton Senators	AHL	69	29	29	58	14	—	—	—	—	—
2015–16	Binghamton Senators	AHL	54	17	25	42	32	—	—	—	—	—
2015–16	Rochester Americans	AHL	19	4	10	14	21	—	—	—	—	—
2015–16	Buffalo Sabres	NHL	2	0	0	0	0	—	—	—	—	—
2016–17	Rochester Americans	AHL	71	24	39	63	45	—	—	—	—	—
2016–17	Buffalo Sabres	NHL	4	0	1	1	0	—	—	—	—	—
2017–18	Hartford Wolf Pack	AHL	76	16	34	50	33	—	—	—	—	—
2018–19	Hartford Wolf Pack	AHL	36	13	12	25	33	—	—	—	—	—
2018–19	Milwaukee Admirals	AHL	24	10	12	22	0	5	0	2	2	0
2019–20	Milwaukee Admirals	AHL	54	18	28	46	15	—	—	—	—	—
2020–21	Texas Stars	AHL	36	11	16	27	2	—	—	—	—	—
2021–22	Milwaukee Admirals	AHL	71	30	30	60	18	9	4	4	8	0
2022–23	Milwaukee Admirals	AHL	70	25	26	51	12	8	0	3	3	0
2023–24	Chicago Wolves	AHL	56	13	11	24	22	—	—	—	—	—
NHL totals			6	0	1	1	0	—	—	—	—	—

== Awards and honors ==
Award	Year
College
All-Atlantic Hockey Rookie Team	2010–11
Thomas Jacquard Award	2010–11
Atlantic Hockey All-Tournament Team	2011
All-Atlantic Hockey First Team	2011–12
