= Kalamazoo Jr. K-Wings =

- City: Kalamazoo, Michigan
- League: NAHL
- Division: North
- Founded: 2011
- Folded: 2013
- Home arena: Wings West
- Colors: Red, white, and blue
- General manager: Marc Fakler
- Head coach: Marc Fakler
- Media: WLKM (95.9 FM) Kalamazoo Gazette
- Affiliates: Kalamazoo Wings (ECHL)

Franchise history
- 2011–2013: Kalamazoo Jr. K-Wings

The Kalamazoo Jr. K-Wings were an American Tier II junior ice hockey team based in Kalamazoo, Michigan. The Kalamazoo Jr. K-Wings began its inaugural season in 2011. The K-Wings played their home games at Wings West Arena, (formerly known as S2 Ice Arena) which seats 1,500. On November 4, 2010 the North American Hockey League approved of the K-Wings affiliation with the ECHL's Kalamazoo Wings. This team was a different franchise than the previous Kalamazoo Jr. Wings team that eventually became the Danville Wings and eventually the Indiana Ice of the United States Hockey League.

On February 4, 2013, the K-Wings announced that the organization would cease operations after the completion of the 2012–13 NAHL season. Kalamazoo had the lowest attendance averaging around 350 spectators per game.

== Season-by-season records ==
Season	GP	W	L	OTL	PTS	GF	GA	PIM	Finish	Playoffs
2011–12	60	37	19	4	78	213	171	814	2nd of 5, North t-10th of 28, NAHL	Won Div. Semifinal series, 3–1 vs. Traverse City North Stars; Lost Div. Final series, 1–3 vs. Port Huron Fighting Falcons
2012–13	60	35	19	6	76	184	169	851	3rd of 8, North; 9th of 24, NAHL	Won Div. Play-in series, 2–0 vs. Springfield Jr. Blues; Lost Div. Semifinal series, 0–3 vs. Jamestown Ironmen
