= Traverse City North Stars =

- City: Traverse City, Michigan
- League: NAHL
- Division: North
- Founded: 2005
- Home arena: Centre ICE Arena
- Colors: Red, White, and Blue
- Owner: Steve Fournier
- General manager: Anthony Palumbo
- Head coach: Chad Fournier
- Media: B2 Networks

Franchise history
- 2005–2012: Traverse City North Stars
- 2012–2015: Soo Eagles
- 2015–present: New Jersey Junior Titans

The Traverse City North Stars were a Tier II Junior A ice hockey team in the North American Hockey League's North Division, and played out of 1,500-seat Centre ICE Arena in Traverse City, Michigan. The franchise was purchased by the Soo Eagles, formerly of the Northern Ontario Junior Hockey League, after the 2011–12 season.

== Regular season records ==
Season	GP	W	L	OTL	PTS	GF	GA	PIM	Finish	Postseason
2005–06	58	17	34	7	41	162	258	1,095	4th of 5, North; 17th of 20, NAHL	Lost Div. Semifinal series, 2–3 (USNTDP)
2006–07	62	19	38	5	43	177	276	1,785	5th of 5, North; 16th of 17, NAHL	Did not qualify
2007–08	58	23	23	12	58	176	203	1,268	5th of 6, North; 12th of 18, NAHL	Did not qualify
2008–09	58	34	17	7	75	182	171	1,216	3rd of 6, North t-7th of 19, NAHL	Lost Div. Semifinal series, 2–3 (Mahoning Valley Phantoms)
2009–10	58	33	20	5	71	217	172	1,273	t-1st of 5, North t-5th of 19, NAHL	Won Div. Semifinal series, 3–0 (Janesville Jets); Won Div. Final series, 3–0 (Motor City Machine); Lost Semifinal Round-Robin, 1–6 (Bismarck Bobcats), 1–4 (St. Louis Bandits), 5–4 (Wenatchee Wild), 2–1 (Fairbanks Ice Dogs)
2010–11	58	40	17	1	81	211	159	952	2nd of 8, North; 4th of 19, NAHL	Lost Div. Semifinal series, 1–3 (Michigan Warriors)
2011–12	60	34	20	6	74	200	158	854	3rd of 5, North; 11th of 19, NAHL	Lost Div. Semifinal series, 1–3 (Kalamazoo Jr. K-Wings)
