= Michigan Warriors =

- City: Flint, Michigan
- League: North American Hockey League
- Division: North
- Founded: 2006
- Home arena: Perani Arena and Event Center
- Colors: Blue, red, silver, and white
- General manager: Jeremy Torrey (director of operations)

Franchise history
- 2006–2010: Marquette Rangers
- 2010–2015: Michigan Warriors

Championships
- Division titles: 1 (2010)

The Michigan Warriors were a Tier II Junior A ice hockey team based in Flint, Michigan. The Warriors played in the North American Hockey League's North Division. Previously known as the Marquette Rangers, the Warriors played their home games at Perani Arena and Event Center.

In 2010 and Perani Arena decided to sign a lease agreement with the junior Michigan Warriors instead of the minor professional Flint Generals, leaving only junior hockey in a town that hosted several minor professional teams. Had the Generals returned for 2010–11, the Warriors would have still remained making sure their home schedule had no conflicts with the Generals. In 2015, the Michigan Warriors suspended operations due to the arrival of the Flint Firebirds of the Ontario Hockey League.

== Franchise history ==
Rangers Logo

The Warriors were previously known as the Marquette Rangers playing out of the 3,100-seat Lakeview Arena in Marquette, Michigan. Their inaugural season was 2006–07, in which they were able to make the playoffs but fell to the Mahoning Valley Phantoms in the first round. The Rangers missed the playoffs for the next two seasons before returning in the 2009–10 season. Once more the Rangers fell in the first round, this time swept out in three games by the Motor City Machine. After the season, the team relocated to Flint, Michigan. In their first season in Flint, the Warriors turned a third place regular season finish into a playoff run that took them to the league championship game. In a battle for their respective first league titles, the Warriors dropped a 4–2 game to the Fairbanks Ice Dogs.

Prior to the end of the 2014–15 season the Ontario Hockey League (OHL) announced the relocation of the Plymouth Whalers to Flint to become the Flint Firebirds. Knowing Flint could not support two junior teams at the same time, the Warriors looked for relocation alternatives. When none materialized, the franchise suspended operations.

== Season records ==
Season	GP	W	L	OTL	PTS	GF	GA	PIM	Finish	Playoffs
Marquette Rangers
2006–07	62	25	32	5	55	189	227	1,832	4th of 5, North; 14th of 17, NAHL	Lost Div. Semifinal series, 0–3 (Mahoning Valley Phantoms)
2007–08	58	26	29	3	55	186	216	995	6th of 6, North; 13th of 18, NAHL	Did not qualify
2008–09	58	26	24	8	60	165	170	1,024	t-4th of 6, North t-11th of 19, NAHL	Did not qualify
2009–10	58	35	22	1	71	186	154	1,043	t-1st of 5, North t-5th of 19, NAHL	Lost Div. Semifinal series, 0–3 (Motor City Machine)
Michigan Warriors
2010–11	58	35	17	6	76	202	141	899	3rd of 8, North; 7th of 26, NAHL	Won Div. Semifinal series, 3–1 (Traverse City North Stars); Won Div. Final series, 3–2 (St. Louis Bandits); Won Quarterfinal Play-in series, 2–0 (Bismarck Bobcats); Won Quarterfinal Round-Robin, 5–2 (Topeka Roadrunners), 2–4 (Fairbanks Ice Dogs), 2–5 (Amarillo Bulls); Won Robertson Cup Semifinal, 6–2 (Amarillo Bulls); Lost Robertson Cup Championship, 2–4 (Fairbanks Ice Dogs)
2011–12	60	23	32	5	52	163	212	766	4th of 5, North; 16th of 28, NAHL	Lost Div. Semifinal series, 1–3 (Port Huron Fighting Falcons)
2012–13	60	19	32	9	47	136	177	855	8th of 8, North; 21st of 24, NAHL	Did not qualify
2013–14	60	30	20	10	70	178	173	1128	2nd of 6, North; 9th of 24, NAHL	Won Div. Semifinal series, 3–0 (Janesville Jets); Won Div. Final series, 3–1 (Port Huron Fighting Falcons); Lost Robertson Cup Semifinal series, 0–2 (Fairbanks Ice Dogs)
2014–15	60	25	26	9	59	148	183	994	4th of 6, North; 16th of 24, NAHL	Lost Div. Semifinal series, 0–3 (Janesville Jets)
