= Jamestown Ironmen =

- City: Jamestown, New York
- League: NAHL
- Division: North
- Founded: 2005
- Home arena: Jamestown Saving Bank Arena
- Colors: Red, silver, black, & white
- Owner(s): Kenji Yamada
- Head coach: Dan Daikawa
- Media: Fasthockey

Franchise history
- 2005–2008: Southern Minnesota Express
- 2008–2009: Motor City Machine
- 2009–2011: Motor City Metal Jackets
- 2011–2013: Jamestown Ironmen

The Jamestown Ironmen were a Tier II junior ice hockey team in the North American Hockey League. The Ironmen played their home games at the Jamestown Savings Bank Ice Arena in Jamestown, New York.

== History ==
The franchise began as an expansion team to the NAHL in 2005. The team played in the town of Owatonna, Minnesota, as the Southern Minnesota Express. After the 2007–08 season, it was announced that the Express would relocate to the Detroit Area, where they would be called the Motor City Machine. The Owatonna, Minnesota, market was granted a new franchise with a similar name, the Owatonna Express.

On June 26, 2009, the team announced it was changing its nickname to the Metal Jackets, and removing the triangle and text from the logo.

On May 7, 2011, it was announced the team was moving to Jamestown, New York, to become the Jamestown Ironmen, named after record setting Jamestown Jet Alumnist, Johnathan "The Ironman" Andhor. The city's current Junior A hockey team, the Jamestown Jets, unsuccessfully filed a lawsuit over the move, alleging a conspiracy to remove the Jets in favor of the Ironmen.

In February 2013, Ironmen owner Kenji Yamada indicated he may put the team up for sale due to falling attendance. Yamada stated that he does not want to move the team out of Jamestown. On May 5, it was reported that a deal was completed between a group of local investors and a separate faction to buy the team from Yamada, which would keep the team in Jamestown. This deal ultimately collapsed, and on June 5, 2013, Yamada announced the Ironmen would not return for the 2013–14 season.

The NAHL would eventually return to Jamestown in 2018 with the Jamestown Rebels.

== Season-by-season records ==
| Season | GP | W | L | OTL | PTS | GF | GA | PIM | Finish | Playoffs |
|---|---|---|---|---|---|---|---|---|---|---|
Southern Minnesota Express
| 2005–06 | 58 | 35 | 17 | 6 | 76 | 233 | 175 | 1,120 | 1st of 5, Central; 5th of 20, NAHL | Won Div. Semifinal series, 3–2 (Minnesota Blizzard); Won Div. Final series, 4–0 (Fargo-Moorhead Jets); Lost Semifinal Round-Robin, 7–3 (Texas Tornado), 3–4 (Texas Tornado), 5–2 (Mahoning Valley Phantoms); Won Third Place Game, 6–2 (Mahoning Valley Phantoms) |
| 2006–07 | 62 | 35 | 23 | 4 | 74 | 206 | 177 | 1,238 | 2nd of 6, Central; 7th of 17, NAHL | Won Div. Semifinal series, 3–2 (Alexandria Blizzard); Won Div. Final series, 3–0 (Fargo-Moorhead Jets); Lost Semifinal Round-Robin, 1–4 (Mahoning Valley Phantoms), 1–3 (St. Louis Bandits), 5–3 (Fairbanks Ice Dogs); Won Third Place Game, 3–2 (Fairbanks Ice Dogs) |
| 2007–08 | 58 | 29 | 21 | 8 | 66 | 203 | 229 | 1,308 | 2nd of 6, Central; 17th of 18, NAHL | Lost Div. Semifinal series, 3–2 (Alexandria Blizzard) |
Motor City Machine
| 2008–09 | 58 | 11 | 45 | 2 | 24 | 134 | 254 | 1,518 | 6th of 6, North; 18th of 19, NAHL | Did not qualify |
Motor City Metal Jackets
| 2009–10 | 58 | 25 | 26 | 7 | 57 | 158 | 189 | 1,436 | 4th of 5, North; 12th of 19, NAHL | Won Div. Semifinal series, 3–0 (Marquette Rangers); Lost Div. Final series, 0–3 (Traverse City North Stars) |
| 2010–11 | 58 | 31 | 25 | 2 | 64 | 228 | 188 | 1,377 | 6th of 8, North; 16th of 26, NAHL | Did not qualify |
Jamestown Ironmen
| 2011–12 | 60 | 19 | 36 | 5 | 43 | 148 | 211 | 1,215 | 5th of 5, North t-22nd of 28, NAHL | Did not qualify |
| 2012–13 | 60 | 37 | 19 | 4 | 78 | 170 | 152 | 997 | 2nd of 8, North; 8th of 24, NAHL | Won Div. Semifinal series, 3–0 (Kalamazoo Jr. K-Wings); Won Div. Final series, 3–0 (Soo Eagles); Lost Semifinal Round-Robin, 3–4 (Bismarck Bobcats), 1–2 (OT) (Amarillo Bulls), 2–5 (Wenatchee Wild) |
