= Olli Kervinen =

Finnish politician

Olli Kervinen (23 March 1924, Pyhäselkä – 23 March 1997), was a Finnish farmer and politician. He served as a Member of the Parliament of Finland from 1962 to 1966, representing the Agrarian League, which renamed itself the Centre Party in 1965.
