= Larson Ice Center =

Ice arena in Brookings, South Dakota

Coordinates: 44.31650°N 96.75039°W

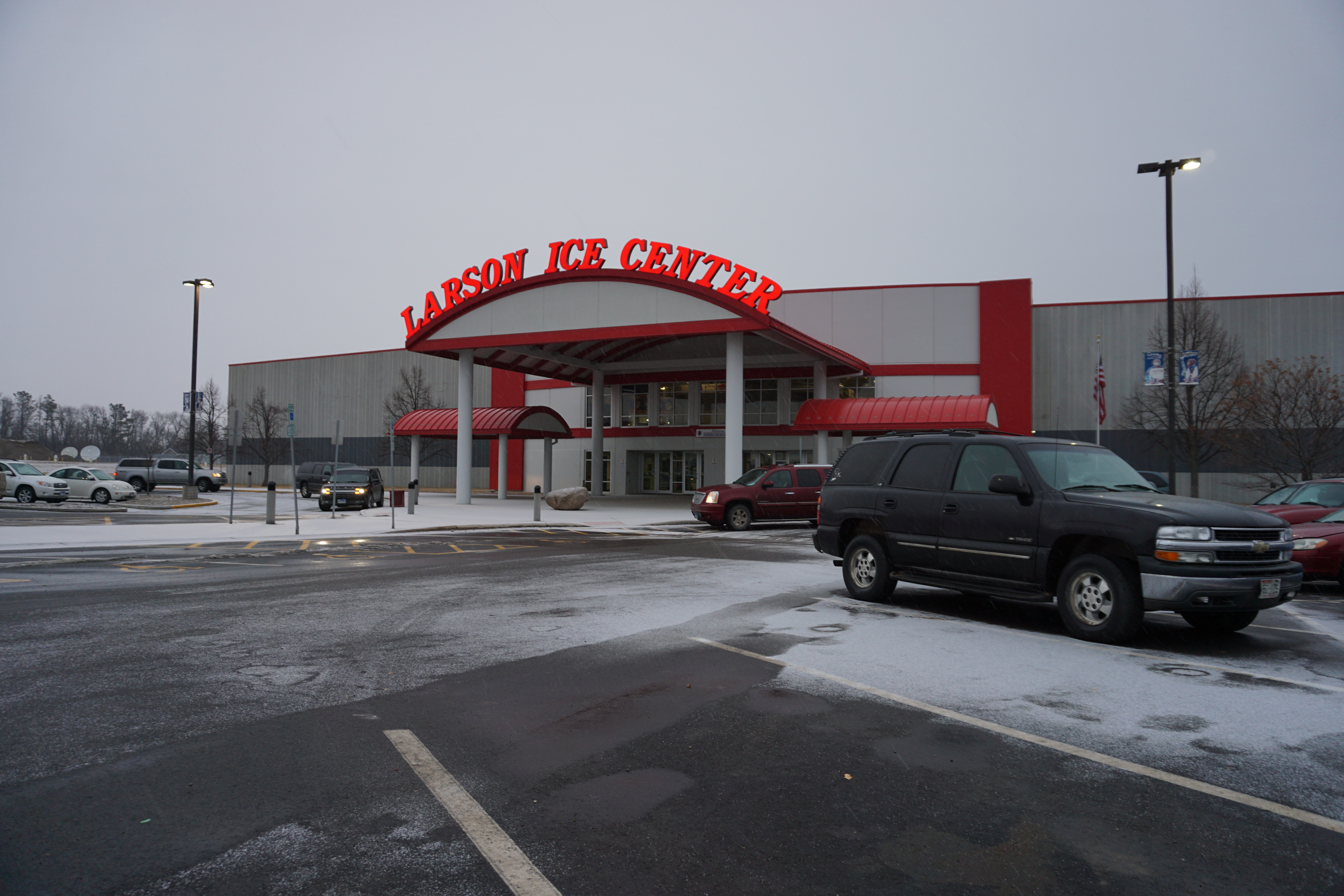
- Interactive map of Larson Ice Center
- Location: 934 32nd Avenue; Brookings, SD 57006
- Owner: City of Brookings
- Operator: City of Brookings Parks and Recreation Department
- Capacity: 2,600 (Ice Hockey)
- Surface: 200' x 85' (Ice Hockey)

Construction
- Groundbreaking: 2001
- Opened: March 2002
- Cost: $7 million ($12.5 million in 2025 dollars)

Tenants
- Brookings Blizzard (NAHL) (2012–2019); South Dakota State Jackrabbits club ice hockey

The Larson Ice Center is a two rink facility arena located in Brookings, South Dakota. Built in 2002, it is home to the South Dakota State Jackrabbits club ice hockey teams and the Brookings Rangers. From 2012 to 2019, it was also home the Tier II junior Brookings Blizzard of the North American Hockey League.

The Larson Ice Center has a seating capacity of approximately 2,000 in the main (Red) rink and 600 in the second (Blue) rink. There are ten locker rooms, with showers and bathrooms. The facility is also fully outfitted with large heated viewing areas, upper and lower level lobbies and an upper level concession area as well.
