= Eetu Karvinen =

Finnish ice hockey player

- Born: 27 January 1993 (age 33) Vantaa, Finland
- Height: 185 cm (6 ft 1 in)
- Weight: 87 kg (192 lb; 13 st 10 lb)
- Position: Forward
- Shot: Left
- Played for: Lukko; RoKi
- NHL draft: Undrafted
- Playing career: 2014–2020

Eetu Karvinen (born 27 January 1993) is a Finnish former ice hockey forward who played for RoKi of the Finnish Mestis.

== Career statistics ==
			Regular season					Playoffs
Season	Team	League	GP	G	A	Pts	PIM	GP	G	A	Pts	PIM
2008–09	Kiekko-Vantaa U16	U16 SM-sarja Q	8	2	5	7	22	—	—	—	—	—
2008–09	Kiekko-Vantaa U16	U16 SM-sarja	24	15	11	26	84	—	—	—	—	—
2009–10	Kiekko-Vantaa U18	U18 SM-sarja Q	12	3	6	9	14	—	—	—	—	—
2009–10	Kiekko-Vantaa U18	U18 SM-sarja	26	12	16	28	20	3	0	0	0	4
2010–11	HIFK U18	U18 SM-sarja Q	8	4	4	8	10	—	—	—	—	—
2010–11	HIFK U18	U18 SM-sarja	16	5	16	21	20	3	0	0	0	24
2010–11	HIFK U20	U20 SM-liiga	1	0	0	0	0	—	—	—	—	—
2011–12	HIFK U20	U20 SM-liiga	46	9	22	31	26	10	4	4	8	4
2012–13	Cedar Rapids RoughRiders	USHL	9	2	1	3	0	—	—	—	—	—
2012–13	Sioux City Musketeers	USHL	17	2	1	3	4	—	—	—	—	—
2012–13	Brookings Blizzard	NAHL	24	2	9	11	16	3	1	0	1	4
2013–14	Minnesota Magicians	NAHL	60	10	22	32	35	—	—	—	—	—
2014–15	TUTO Hockey	Mestis	2	0	0	0	0	—	—	—	—	—
2014–15	RB Hockey Juniors	MHL	27	6	12	18	22	—	—	—	—	—
2015–16	Lukko	Liiga	3	0	0	0	0	—	—	—	—	—
2015–16	KeuPa HT	Mestis	24	2	1	3	4	—	—	—	—	—
2015–16	Kokkolan Hermes	Mestis	20	7	1	8	10	7	0	1	1	2
2016–17	Chamonix HC	Ligue Magnus	34	2	9	11	22	—	—	—	—	—
2017–18	RoKi	Mestis	20	2	5	7	2	—	—	—	—	—
2018–19	RoKi	Mestis	45	7	7	14	24	6	0	0	0	4
2019–20	RoKi	Mestis	50	5	11	16	56	—	—	—	—	—
Liiga totals			3	0	0	0	0	—	—	—	—	—
Mestis totals			161	23	25	48	96	13	0	1	1	6
