= Mikko Kurvinen =

Finnish ice hockey player

- Born: March 11, 1979 (age 46); Anjalankoski, Finland
- Height: 6 ft 2 in (188 cm)
- Weight: 198 lb (90 kg; 14 st 2 lb)
- Position: Defence
- Shot: Left
- Played for: AaKoo; HIFK; Mora IK; Modo Hockey; Kiekko-Vantaa; FPS
- NHL draft: Undrafted
- Playing career: 1999–2014

Mikko Kurvinen (born March 11, 1979) is a Finnish professional ice hockey defenceman. He currently plays for HIFK of the Finnish Liiga.

== Career statistics ==
			Regular season					Playoffs
Season	Team	League	GP	G	A	Pts	PIM	GP	G	A	Pts	PIM
1995–96	AaKoo	II-divisioona	31	2	7	9	2	5	2	0	2	0
1996–97	AaKoo	II-divisioona	35	11	11	22	4	—	—	—	—	—
1997–98	AaKoo	II-divisioona	24	0	7	7	12	—	—	—	—	—
1998–99	AaKoo	II-divisioona	—	—	—	—	—	—	—	—	—	—
1998–99	HIFK U20	U20 SM-liiga	—	—	—	—	—	—	—	—	—	—
1999–00	HIFK U20	U20 SM-liiga	38	6	9	15	16	3	0	0	0	0
1999–00	HIFK	SM-liiga	14	0	0	0	4	9	0	0	0	6
2000–01	HIFK	SM-liiga	39	3	4	7	14	4	1	0	1	0
2001–02	HIFK	SM-liiga	14	0	0	0	2	—	—	—	—	—
2002–03	HIFK	SM-liiga	20	1	5	6	29	4	0	0	0	0
2002–03	FPS	Mestis	4	1	1	2	2	—	—	—	—	—
2003–04	HIFK	SM-liiga	52	0	4	4	14	12	1	0	1	2
2004–05	HIFK	SM-liiga	26	3	1	4	6	—	—	—	—	—
2005–06	HIFK	SM-liiga	46	1	2	3	16	9	0	1	1	6
2006–07	Mora IK	Elitserien	47	4	5	9	49	4	1	1	2	2
2007–08	Mora IK	Elitserien	55	4	11	15	22	—	—	—	—	—
2008–09	Modo Hockey	Elitserien	49	0	2	2	22	—	—	—	—	—
2009–10	HIFK	SM-liiga	28	0	3	3	18	6	0	0	0	4
2009–10	Kiekko-Vantaa	Mestis	1	0	0	0	0	—	—	—	—	—
2010–11	HIFK	SM-liiga	51	0	4	4	30	15	0	1	1	6
2011–12	HIFK	SM-liiga	35	0	6	6	93	2	0	0	0	0
2012–13	HIFK	SM-liiga	14	0	0	0	0	4	0	1	1	25
2013–14	HIFK	Liiga	1	0	1	1	2	—	—	—	—	—
SM-liiga totals			340	8	30	38	228	65	2	3	5	49
