= Edgars Lipsbergs =

Latvian ice hockey player

- Born: June 10, 1989 (age 37) Riga, Latvian SSR, Soviet Union
- Height: 5 ft 10 in (178 cm)
- Weight: 171 lb (78 kg; 12 st 3 lb)
- Position: Forward
- Shoots: Right
- KHL team (P) Cur. team Former teams: Dinamo Riga; HK Riga (MHL); SK Riga 18; SK Riga 20; SK LSPA/Riga
- National team: Latvia
- Playing career: 2004–present

Edgars Lipsbergs (born June 9, 1989 in Riga, Soviet Union) is a Latvian ice hockey forward, currently playing for HK Riga of Minor Hockey League. He has played for Latvian national junior team and several Latvian league youth teams before joining HK Riga. His brothers Miks Lipsbergs, Roberts Lipsbergs and Krišs Lipsbergs also are hockey players.
