= List of LIU Sharks men's ice hockey seasons =

This is a list of seasons completed by the Long Island University men's ice hockey team. The list documents the season-by-season records of the Sharks from the team's founding in 2020 to present, including postseason results.

== Season-by-season results ==
Note: GP = Games played, W = Wins, L = Losses, T = Ties

NCAA D-I Champions	NCAA Frozen Four	Conference Regular Season Champions	Conference Playoff Champions

Season	Conference	Regular Season (Note: Code explanation; GP—Games Played, W—Wins, L—Losses, T—Tied games, Pts—Points*)											Conference Tournament Results	National Tournament Results
Season	Conference	Conference						Overall					Conference Tournament Results	National Tournament Results
Season	Conference	GP	W	L	T	Pts*	Finish	GP	W	L	T	%	Conference Tournament Results	National Tournament Results
Division I
Brett Riley (2020 — 2025)
2020–21	Independent	—	—	—	—	—	—	13	3	10	0	.231		
2021–22	Independent	—	—	—	—	—	—	34	10	21	3	.338		
2022–23	Independent	—	—	—	—	—	—	36	13	22	1	.375		
2023–24	Independent	—	—	—	—	—	—	37	16	20	1	.446		
2024–25	Independent	—	—	—	—	—	—	34	20	12	2	.618		
Brendan Riley (2025 — Present)
2025–26	Independent	—	—	—	—	—	—	33	14	18	1	.439	Lost UCHC Semifinal, 3–4 (Lindenwood); Won Consolation Semifinal, 4–3 (OT) (Alaska); Won Third Place Game, 4–3 (Stonehill)	
Totals								GP	W	L	T	%	Championships	
Regular Season								184	74	102	8	.424		
Conference Post-season								3	2	1	0	.667		
NCAA Post-season								0	0	0	0	–		
Regular Season and Post-season Record								187	76	103	8	.428		

* Winning percentage is used when conference schedules are unbalanced.
