= LIU Sharks men's ice hockey statistical leaders =

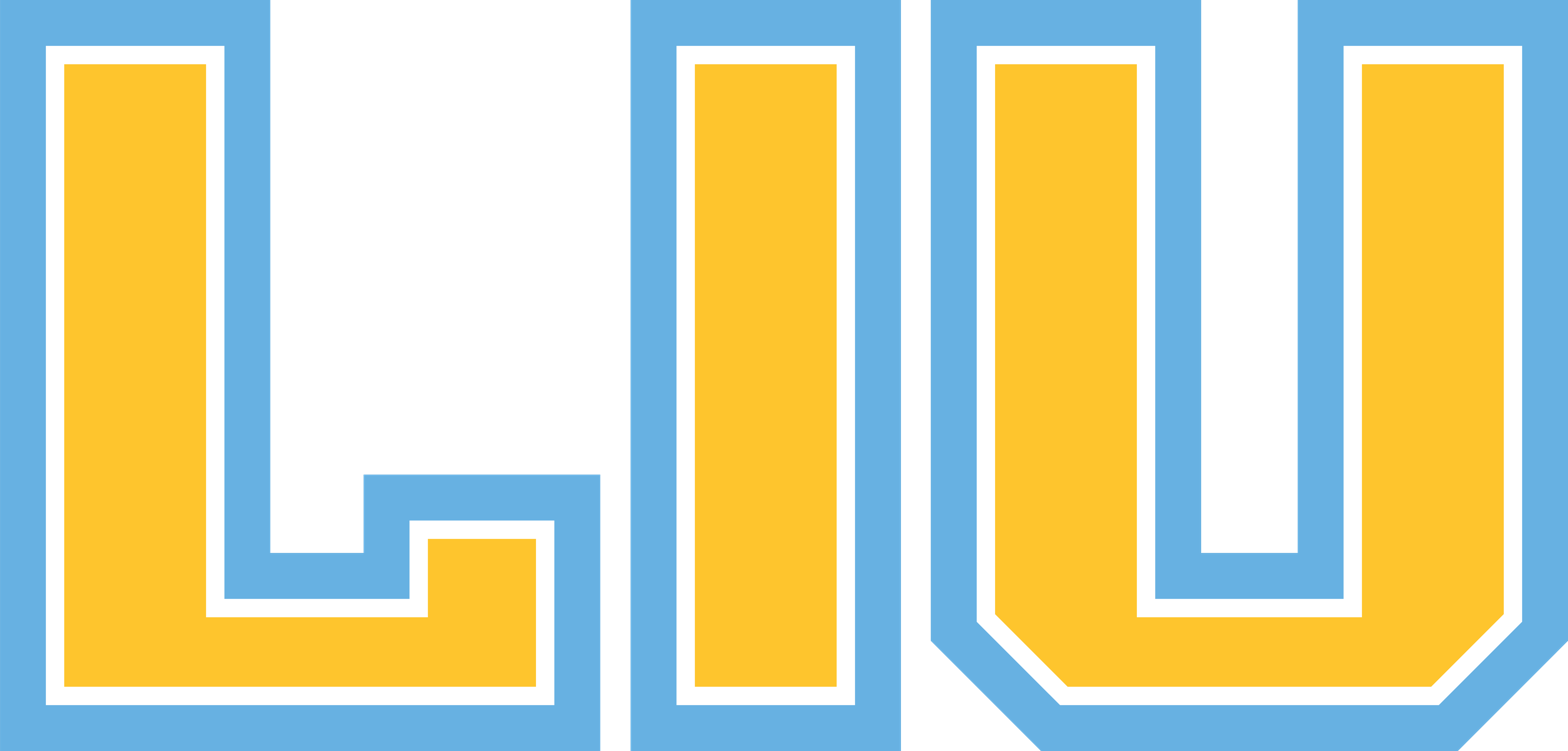

The LIU Sharks men's ice hockey statistical leaders are individual statistical leaders of the LIU Sharks men's ice hockey program in various categories, including goals, assists, points, and saves. Within those areas, the lists identify single-game, single-season, and career leaders. The Sharks represent Long Island University as an independent in the NCAA.

LIU began competing in intercollegiate ice hockey in 2020. These lists are updated through the end of the 2020–21 season.

== Goals ==
Career
Rk	Player	Goals	Seasons
1	Josh Zary	44	2022–23 2023–24 2024–25
2	Isaiah Fox	36	2021–22 2022–23 2023–24 2024–25
3	Austin Brimmer	22	2022–23 2023–24 2024–25
4	Nolan Welsh	19	2020–21 2021–22 2022–23 2023–24
	Riley Wallack	19	2022–23 2023–24 2024–25
6	Chris Pappas	18	2022–23 2023–24 2024–25
7	Anthony Vincent	17	2022–23
	Carter Rapalje	17	2024–25
	Isaac Lambert	17	2024–25 2025–26
10	Noah Kane	16	2022–23 2023–24

Season
Rk	Player	Goals	Season
1	Josh Zary	20	2023–24
2	Anthony Vincent	17	2022–23
	Carter Rapalje	17	2024–25
4	Adam Goodsir	15	2022–23
5	Billy Jerry	14	2021–22
	Isaiah Fox	14	2023–24
7	Remy Parker	13	2023–24
	Noah Serdachny	13	2025–26
9	Josh Zary	12	2022–23
	Josh Zary	12	2024–25

Single Game
Rk	Player	Goals	Season	Opponent
1	Billy Jerry	4	2021–22	Brown
2	Isaiah Fox	3	2023–24	Yale
	Nate Benoit	3	2025–26	Alaska Anchorage
4	Zack Bross	2	2020–21	RIT
	Jacob Franczak	2	2020–21	Army
	Billy Jerry	2	2021–22	Notre Dame
	Tyler Welsh	2	2021–22	Miami
	Anthony Vincent	2	2022–23	Stonehill
	Zachary Nazzarett	2	2022–23	Wisconsin
	Cade Mason	2	2022–23	Brown
	Anthony Vincent	2	2022–23	Northeastern
	Riley Wallack	2	2022–23	Stonehill
	Josh Zary	2	2022–23	Stonehill
	Adam Goodsir	2	2022–23	Stonehill
	Anthony Vincent	2	2022–23	Alaska
	Josh Zary	2	2022–23	Alaska
	Grayson Constable	2	2023–24	Holy Cross
	Remy Parker	2	2023–24	Stonehill
	Remy Parker	2	2023–24	Stonehill
	Josh Zary	2	2023–24	Omaha
	Noah Kane	2	2023–24	Lindenwood
	Josh Zary	2	2023–24	Brown
	Josh Zary	2	2023–24	Stonehill
	Remy Parker	2	2023–24	Stonehill
	Adam Pitters	2	2023–24	Stonehill
	Nolan Welsh	2	2023–24	Stonehill
	Riley Wallack	2	2024–25	Stonehill
	Onni Leppänen	2	2024–25	Stonehill
	Austin Brimmer	2	2024–25	Vermont
	Carter Rapalje	2	2024–25	Holy Cross
	Isaiah Fox	2	2024–25	Stonehill
	Chris Pappas	2	2024–25	Alaska
	Carter Rapalje	2	2024–25	Alaska
	JR Perdion	2	2025–26	Canisius
	Brett Rylance	2	2025–26	Canisius
	Nick Bernardo	2	2025–26	Penn State
	Dylan Kinch	2	2025–26	New Hampshire
	Dylan Kinch	2	2025–26	Merrimack
	Brett Rylance	2	2025–26	Merrimack
	Onni Leppänen	2	2025–26	Robert Morris
	Brett Rylance	2	2025–26	Minnesota
	JR Perdion	2	2025–26	Lindenwood
	Onni Leppänen	2	2025–26	Assumption
	Isaac Lambert	2	2025–26	Alaska Anchorage
	Brett Rylance	2	2025–26	Stonehill
	Noah Serdachny	2	2025–26	Alaska-Anchorage
	Isaac Lambert	2	2025–26	Alaska-Anchorage
	Noah Serdachny	2	2025–26	Stonehill

== Assists ==
Career
Rk	Player	Assists	Seasons
1	Cade Mason	65	2022–23 2023–24 2024–25
2	Chris Pappas	36	2022–23 2023–24 2024–25
3	Nolan Welsh	33	2020–21 2021–22 2022–23 2023–24
	Isaiah Fox	33	2021–22 2022–23 2023–24 2024–25
5	Noah Kane	31	2022–23 2023–24
	Austin Brimmer	31	2022–23 2023–24 2024–25
7	Valtteri Piironen	29	2022–23 2023–24 2024–25
8	John Perdion	28	2024–25 2025–26
9	Josh Zary	26	2022–23 2023–24 2024–25
10	Spencer Cox	25	2021–22 2022–23
	Jordan Di Cicco	25	2020–21 2021–22 2022–23 2023–24

Season
Rk	Player	Assists	Season
1	Cade Mason	27	2023–24
2	Cade Mason	25	2022–23
3	Noah Kane	22	2023–24
4	Patriks Marcinkevics	21	2022–23
	Isaiah Fox	21	2023–24
6	Anthony Vincent	20	2022–23
	Chris Pappas	20	2023–24
8	Adam Goodsir	19	2022–23
9	Tyler Welsh	18	2021–22
	Trevor Griebel	18	2025–26

Single Game
Rk	Player	Assists	Season	Opponent
1	Patriks Marcinkevics	4	2022–23	Stonehill
	Cade Mason	4	2023–24	Stonehill
3	Nolan Welsh	3	2020–21	Holy Cross
	Billy Jerry	3	2021–22	Miami
	Patriks Marcinkevics	3	2022–23	Brown
	Spencer Cox	3	2022–23	Lindenwood
	Nolan Welsh	3	2022–23	Stonehill
	Isaiah Fox	3	2023–24	Stonehill
	Nolan Welsh	3	2023–24	Stonehill
	Noah Serdachny	3	2025–26	Alaska Anchorage

== Points ==
Career
Rk	Player	Points	Seasons
1	Cade Mason	75	2022–23 2023–24 2024–25
2	Josh Zary	70	2022–23 2023–24 2024–25
3	Isaiah Fox	69	2021–22 2022–23 2023–24 2024–25
4	Chris Pappas	54	2022–23 2023–24 2024–25
5	Austin Brimmer	53	2022–23 2023–24 2024–25
6	Nolan Welsh	52	2020–21 2021–22 2022–23 2023–24
7	Noah Kane	47	2022–23 2023–24
8	John Perdion	43	2024–25 2025–26
9	Anthony Vincent	37	2022–23
	Jordan Di Cicco	37	2020–21 2021–22 2022–23 2023–24

Season
Rk	Player	Points	Season
1	Anthony Vincent	37	2022–23
2	Isaiah Fox	35	2023–24
3	Adam Goodsir	34	2022–23
	Josh Zary	34	2023–24
5	Cade Mason	32	2022–23
6	Billy Jerry	31	2021–22
	Chris Pappas	31	2023–24
8	Noah Kane	30	2023–24
	Carter Rapalje	30	2024–25
10	Cade Mason	29	2023–24
	Noah Serdachny	29	2025–26

Single Game
Rk	Player	Points	Season	Opponent
1	Billy Jerry	4	2021–22	Brown
	Patriks Marcinkevics	4	2022–23	Brown
	Nolan Welsh	4	2022–23	Stonehill
	Patriks Marcinkevics	4	2022–23	Stonehill
	Cade Mason	4	2023–24	Stonehill
	Noah Serdachny	4	2025–26	Alaska Anchorage

== Saves ==
Career
Rk	Player	Saves	Seasons
1	Vinnie Purpura	1190	2020–21 2021–22 2022–23
2	Daniel Duris	953	2024–25 2025–26
3	Brandon Perrone	833	2021–22 2022–23 2023–24
4	Kris Carlson	485	2021–22
5	Noah Rupprecht	482	2023–24 2024–25
6	Garrett Metcalf	329	2020–21
7	Tyriq Outen	297	2024–25
8	Rico Dimatteo	139	2023–24
9	Carter Bickle	43	2025–26
10	Lukas Renaud	39	2025–26

Season
Rk	Player	Saves	Season
1	Daniel Duris	870	2025–26
2	Vinnie Purpura	690	2022–23
3	Brandon Perrone	535	2023–24
4	Kris Carlson	485	2021–22
5	Vinnie Purpura	389	2021–22
6	Noah Rupprecht	347	2024–25
7	Garrett Metcalf	329	2020–21
8	Tyriq Outen	297	2024–25
9	Brandon Perrone	255	2022–23
10	Rico Dimatteo	139	2023–24

Single Game
Rk	Player	Saves	Season	Opponent
1	Kris Carlson	54	2021–22	Arizona State
2	Daniel Duris	46	2025–26	Merrimack
3	Vinnie Purpura	43	2022–23	Northeastern
4	Garrett Metcalf	42	2020–21	Army
	Vinnie Purpura	42	2022–23	Michigan State
	Vinnie Purpura	42	2022–23	Arizona State
7	Garrett Metcalf	41	2020–21	Holy Cross
	Garrett Metcalf	41	2020–21	Quinnipiac
	Kris Carlson	41	2021–22	Ohio State
10	Garrett Metcalf	39	2020–21	Holy Cross
	Daniel Duris	39	2025–26	Connecticut
