= Rob Riley (ice hockey) =

American ice hockey coach

- Born: January 15, 1955 (age 71) West Point, New York, U.S.
- Height: 6 ft 0 in (183 cm)
- Weight: 174 lb (79 kg; 12 st 6 lb)
- Position: Center
- Played for: Boston College (ECAC)
- NHL draft: Undrafted
- Playing career: 1974–1978 Coaching career

Biographical details
- Education: Boston College

Coaching career (HC unless noted)
- 1978–1980: Boston College (assistant)
- 1980–1983: St. Lawrence (assistant)
- 1983–1985: Babson
- 1985–1986: Army (assistant)
- 1986–2004: Army
- 2010–2012: Springfield Falcons
- 2021–2023: Long Island (assistant)

Administrative career (AD unless noted)
- 2013–2017: Regis College (MA)

Accomplishments and honors

Championships
- 1x NCAA Division III men's ice hockey champion (1984)

Awards
- Edward Jeremiah Award (1985)

Rob Riley (born January 15, 1955) is an American ice hockey coach who was the head coach of the Army Black Knights men's ice hockey from 1986 to 2004.

== Career ==
Riley played at Boston College fron 1974 to 1978 and was co-captain his senior year. He was a graduate assistant at BC for two seasons, then became an assistant coach at St. Lawrence.

In 1983, Riley was named head hockey coach at Babson College. He led the Beavers to an NCAA Division III championship in his first season. At 28, he was the youngest coach ever to win the title. The following season, he won the Edward Jeremiah Award. Riley served as associate coach under his father, John P. Riley Jr., at Army during the 1985–86 season. He succeeded his father as head coach the following season. In his eighteen years at the school, Riley amassed a 257–288–33 record. He left coaching in 2004 for a position at Legg Mason and was succeeded by his younger brother and associate head coach, Brian Riley.

In addition to his work in the financial field, Riley was a part-time scout with the Columbus Blue Jackets. He returned to the bench in 2010 as head coach of the Blue Jackets' American Hockey League affiliate, the Springfield Falcons. He was fired after the 2011–12 season and succeeded by Nolan Pratt. He continued to work with the Blue Jackets as a regional scout.

In January 2013, Riley became the athletic director at Regis College. He was an amateur scout for the Buffalo Sabres from 2017 to 2021. He was a volunteer assistant for the LIU Sharks men's ice hockey team while his son, Brett, was head coach. Since 2023, Riley has been a scout for the Colorado Avalanche.

== Personal life ==
Riley is the son of former Army and United States men's national ice hockey team coach John P. Riley Jr., nephew of Bill and Joe Riley, and cousin of Bill Riley Jr. He was one of five sibilings (four brothers and one sister) who played college hockey.

Riley's son, Brett, is the current head coach of the Ferris State Bulldogs men's ice hockey team. His nephews, Jack and Brendan Riley are also college hockey coaches.

== Head coaching record ==
Record table
Season	Team	Overall	Conference	Standing	Postseason
Babson Beavers (ECAC 2) (1983–1985)
1983–84	Babson	27–5–1	17–3–1	2nd	NCAA National Champion
1984–85	Babson	22–9–0	16–6–0	2nd	NCAA Quarterfinals
Babson:		49–14–1	23–9–1		
Army Cadets (ECAC Hockey) (1986–1991)
1986–87	Army	9–19–1	6–16–0	11th	
1987–88	Army	9–19–2	3–17–2	11th	
1988–89	Army	13–16–1	6–15–1	10th	
1989–90	Army	10–16–4	4–15–3	12th	
1990–91	Army	8–18–3	3–17–2	11th	
Army:		49–88–11	22–80–8		
Army Cadets Independent (1991–1999)
1991–92	Army	13–17–1			
1992–93	Army	16–11–1			
1993–94	Army	14–16–0			
1994–95	Army	20–13–1			
1995–96	Army	24–9–1			
1996–97	Army	19–13–2			
1997–98	Army	18–15–1			
1998–99	Army	16–16–3			
Army:		140–110–10			
Army Cadets (CHA) (1999–2000)
1999-00	Army	13–18–2	1–9–0	6th	
Army:		13–18–2	1–9–0		
Army Cadets (MAAC) (2000–2001)
2000–01	Army	14–20–1	11–15–0	7th	MAAC Quarterfinals
Army:		14–20–1	11–15–0		
Army Black Knights (MAAC) (2001–2003)
2001–02	Army	11–18–6	9–11–6	8th	MAAC Quarterfinals
2002–03	Army	18–16–0	13–13–0	t-5th	MAAC Quarterfinals
Army:		29–34–6	22–24–6		
Army Black Knights (Atlantic Hockey) (2003–2004)
2003–04	Army	12–18–3	6–15–3	8th	Atlantic Hockey Quarterfinals
Army:		12–18–3	6–15–3		
Total:		306–302–34			
National champion Postseason invitational champion Conference regular season champion Conference regular season and conference tournament champion Division regular season champion Division regular season and conference tournament champion Conference tournament champion

Awards and achievements
Preceded by Bob Peters	Edward Jeremiah Award; 1984–85	Succeeded by Terry Meagher
