= Brendan Riley =

American ice hockey player & coach (born 1996)

Current position
- Title: Head coach
- Team: Long Island
- Conference: Independent

Biographical details
- Born: March 29, 1996 (age 30); West Point, New York, US
- Education: Mercyhurst University

Playing career
- 2016–2020: Mercyhurst
- Position: Center

Coaching career (HC unless noted)
- 2020–2021: The Winchendon School (asst.)
- 2021–2025: American International (asst.)
- 2025–Present: Long Island

Head coaching record
- Overall: 16–23–1 (.413)

Brendan Riley is an American ice hockey coach and former center. He is currently in charge of the men's program at Long Island and is the fifth member of his family to coach Division I college hockey.

== Career ==
Riley graduated from Kimball Union Academy in 2015 and then spent one final year playing junior in both the BCHL and USPHL. He began attending Mercyhurst in the fall of 2016 and spent four years with the program. In his senior season he served as an assistant captain, finishing his career with 91 games played. After receiving his degree, Riley immediately joined the family business by becoming as assistant coach at The Winchendon School, a prep school in Massachusetts. After a year, he joined the staff at American International as the director of hockey operations under Eric Lang, a protegee of his father, Brian. He became an assistant coach after a year and spent three seasons in that capacity before the program was downgraded to Division II. With his position in doubt, Riley was offered his first head coaching position when the job at Long Island University came open. Riley was the program's second head coach, replacing his cousin Brett.

== Personal life ==
Riley's family has long been associated with college ice hockey with his grandfather Jack being a star player at Dartmouth before leading the program at Army for 36 years. Upon Jack's retirement in 1986, he was replaced by Brendan's uncle, Rob who then helmed the program for 18 years before turning it over to Brendan's father, Brian. Brendan's brother Jack is also a college hockey coach, serving as an assistant at Sacred Heart as of 2025.

== Career statistics ==
			Regular season					Playoffs
Season	Team	League	GP	G	A	Pts	PIM	GP	G	A	Pts	PIM
2016–17	Mercyhurst	Atlantic Hockey	4	0	1	1	6	—	—	—	—	—
2017–18	Mercyhurst	Atlantic Hockey	20	3	2	5	4	—	—	—	—	—
2018–19	Mercyhurst	Atlantic Hockey	35	1	4	5	31	—	—	—	—	—
2019–20	Mercyhurst	Atlantic Hockey	32	1	4	5	42	—	—	—	—	—
NCAA totals			93	5	11	16	83	—	—	—	—	—

== College head coaching record ==
Record table
Season	Team	Overall	Conference	Standing	Postseason
Long Island Sharks (Independent) (2025–present)
2025–26	Long Island	14–18–1			UCHC Third Place Game (Win)
2026–27	Long Island	2–5–0			
Long Island:		16–23–1			
Total:		16–23–1 (.413)			
National champion Postseason invitational champion Conference regular season champion Conference regular season and conference tournament champion Division regular season champion Division regular season and conference tournament champion Conference tournament champion
