= 2025–26 LIU Sharks men's ice hockey season =

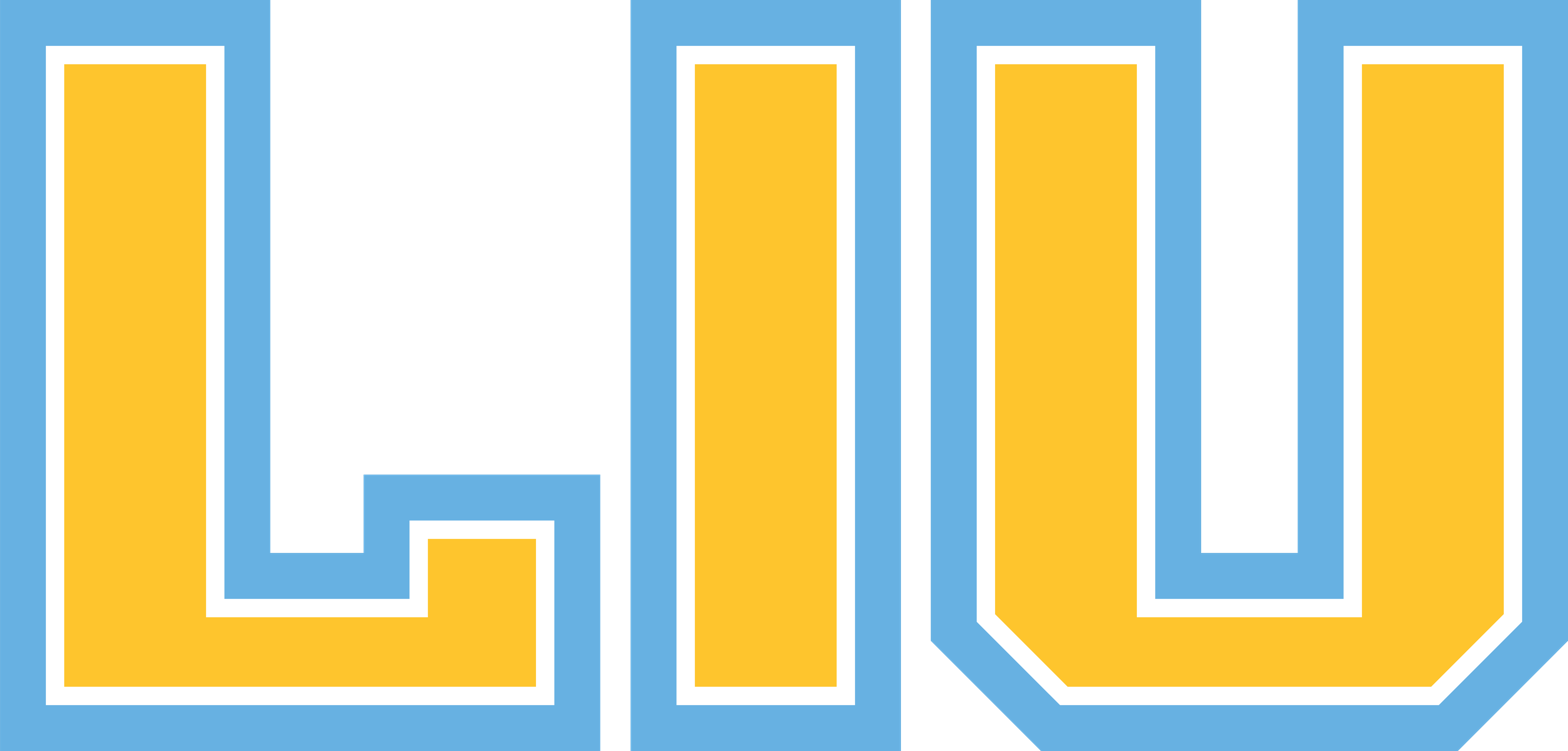
- Conference: Independent
- Home ice: Northwell Health Ice Center

Rankings
- USCHO: NR
- USA Hockey: NR

Record
- Overall: 14–18–1
- Home: 2–3–1
- Road: 10–15–0
- Neutral: 2–0–0

Coaches and captains
- Head coach: Brendan Riley
- Assistant coaches: Mikhail Bryan; C. J. Kusch
- Captain: Casey McDonald
- Alternate captain(s): Heath Armstrong; A.J. Casperson; Trevor Griebel; Brett Rylance

The 2025–26 LIU Sharks men's ice hockey season will be the 6th season of play for the program. The Sharks will represent Long Island University in the 2025–26 NCAA Division I men's ice hockey season, play their home games at the Northwell Health Ice Center and be coached by Brendan Riley, in his 1st season.

== Season ==
After the end of the previous season, head coach Brett Riley was hired by Ferris State for the same position. Less than two weeks later, Long Island announced that they had hired Brendan Riley, Brett's cousin, as his replacement. Along with the change in head coach came an increase in roster turnover as five players followed the elder Riley to the Bulldogs. Among the untimely losses were the primary starter in goal and the top two goal scorers from last season. Brendan Riley was able to neutralize those losses in part thanks to the diminution of American International and take on four former Yellow Jackets.

As the season began, the roster turnover did the team no favors as they dropped five of their first six games. A lack of scoring was the primary reason for the defeats, however, as soon as the team was able to find the back of the next, they immediately went on a winning streak and brought themselves back up to .500. This pattern would repeat throughout the season as the Sharks oscillated stretches of good and bad play. Noah Serdachny and Brett Rylance, two of the AIC transfers, finished 1st and 4th in scoring respectively on an offense that wasn't quite as good as it had been a year before but was still a consistent threat. The biggest chance came in goal where Daniel Duris, who had been the third string netminder as a freshman, now found himself as the starter. There were several stretches during the season where the young goaltender was unable to rise to the occasion, however, he was also impacted by the fact that the LIU defense had worsened significantly since last year. Long Island allowed more than 200 additional shots over the course of their season and Duris could not shoulder the extra load all of the time. The increased pressure on goal resulted in the team finishing the year with a losing record.

At season's end, Long Island participated in the inaugural United Collegiate Hockey Cup. Their record against fellow independent clubs resulted in their being seeded #3 and meeting Lindenwood in the semifinal. The two battled hard in the game with LIU twice tying the score but fell behind for a third time with just 8 seconds to play and were sent into the consolation round. Over their final two matches, Serdachny ran roughshod over Stonehill and Alaska Anchorage with five points to earn the Sharks a third place finish.

== Departures ==
Player	Position	Nationality	Cause
Austin Brimmer	Forward	Canada	Transferred to RIT
Isaiah Fox	Forward	Canada	Graduation (signed with Adirondack Thunder)
John Gormley	Defenseman	United States	Graduation (signed with San Jose Barracuda)
Connor Gregga	Forward	Canada	Graduation (signed with Savannah Ghost Pirates)
Aaron Grounds	Forward	United States	Graduation (retired)
Xan Gurney	Defenseman	United States	Graduation (retired)
Andrius Kulbis-Marino	Defenseman	United States	Graduation (signed with Utah Grizzlies)
Cade Mason	Defenseman	Canada	Transferred to Northern Michigan
Tyriq Outen	Goaltender	United States	Graduation (signed with Knoxville Ice Bears)
Chris Pappas	Forward	Canada	Graduation (retired)
Valtteri Piironen	Defenseman	Finland	Transferred to Ferris State
Carter Rapalje	Forward	United States	Transferred to Ferris State
Noah Rupprecht	Goaltender	United States	Transferred to Ferris State
Nick Trela	Forward	United States	Graduation (retired)
Riley Wallack	Forward	Canada	Transferred to Ferris State
Josh Zary	Forward	Canada	Transferred to Ferris State

== Recruiting ==
Player	Position	Nationality	Age	Notes
Nate Benoit	Defenseman	United States	22	Bow, NH; transfer from Quinnipiac; selected 182nd overall in 2021
Carter Bickle	Goaltender	Canada	21	Brooklin, ON
Blake Dangos	Defenseman	United States	23	St. Louis, MO; transfer from American International
Jack Darby	Defenseman	United States	21	New Hartford, NY
Jaden Dyke	Forward	Canada	21	St. John's, NL
Trevor Griebel	Defenseman	United States	24	Tampa, FL; transfer from Merrimack
Luke Hause	Defenseman	United States	21	Saint Paul, MN
Dylan Kinch	Forward	Canada	20	Salzburg, AUT
Blake Matheson	Defenseman	United States	20	Everett, WA
Casey McDonald	Forward	Canada	24	Kindersley, SK; transfer from American International
John McMahon	Forward	United States	21	Oceanside, NY
Lukas Renaud	Goaltender	Canada	21	Montréal, QC
Brett Rylance	Forward	Canada	24	Edmonton, AB; transfer from American International
Noah Serdachny	Forward	Canada	22	Edmonton, AB; transfer from American International

== Roster ==
As of September 19, 2025.

No.	Nat.	Player	Class	Pos	Height	Weight	DoB	Hometown	Previous team	NHL rights
1	(United States)	Michael Polston	Sophomore	G	5' 11" (1.8 m)	170 lb (77 kg)	2004-10-07	Cedarburg, Wisconsin	Provo Predators (NCDC)	—
2	(United States)	Trent Powell	Sophomore	D	5' 10" (1.78 m)	185 lb (84 kg)	2004-03-09	Soldotna, Alaska	Anchorage Wolverines (NAHL)	—
3	(United States)	A. J. Casperson (A)	Senior	D	6' 2" (1.88 m)	190 lb (86 kg)	2001-07-19	Flower Mound, Texas	Janesville Jets (NAHL)	—
4	(United States)	Blake Dangos	Senior	D	5' 10" (1.78 m)	174 lb (79 kg)	2002-04-08	St. Louis, Missouri	American International (AHA)	—
5	(United States)	Trevor Griebel (A)	Senior	D	5' 10" (1.78 m)	165 lb (75 kg)	2001-03-07	Tampa, Florida	Merrimack (HEA)	—
6	(United States)	Blake Matheson	Freshman	D	6' 1" (1.85 m)	192 lb (87 kg)	2005-06-06	Everett, Washington	Winkler Flyers (MJHL)	—
7	(Canada)	Jack Darby	Freshman	D	6' 4" (1.93 m)	190 lb (86 kg)	2004-04-29	New Hartford, New York	Anchorage Wolverines (NAHL)	—
9	(Canada)	Daniel Baldassarra	Senior	F	5' 10" (1.78 m)	170 lb (77 kg)	2002-03-15	Woodbridge, Ontario	North York Rangers (OJHL)	—
10	(Canada)	Heath Armstrong (A)	Sophomore	F	5' 8" (1.73 m)	172 lb (78 kg)	2002-05-12	Calgary, Alberta	Brooks Bandits (AJHL)	—
11	(United States)	John McMahon	Freshman	F	5' 11" (1.8 m)	190 lb (86 kg)	2004-05-25	Oceanside, New York	New Jersey Titans (NAHL)	—
12	(Canada)	Brennan Nelson	Sophomore	F	5' 11" (1.8 m)	205 lb (93 kg)	2003-03-21	Edmonton, Alberta	West Kelowna Warriors (BCHL)	—
15	(United States)	Luca Leighton	Sophomore	F	5' 8" (1.73 m)	181 lb (82 kg)	2003-08-13	Old Brookville, New York	Rochester Jr. Americans (NAHL)	—
17	(Sweden)	Sixten Jennersjö	Sophomore	F	5' 10" (1.78 m)	179 lb (81 kg)	2003-04-18	Ekerö, Sweden	Northeast Generals (NAHL)	—
18	(Canada)	Anthony Lucarelli	Sophomore	F	6' 2" (1.88 m)	190 lb (86 kg)	2003-10-16	Chatham, Ontario	Powell River Kings (BCHL)	—
19	(Canada)	Chad Muller	Sophomore	F	6' 1" (1.85 m)	190 lb (86 kg)	2003-07-13	Kingston, Ontario	Minot Minotauros (NAHL)	—
22	(United States)	Nate Benoit	Junior	D	6' 0" (1.83 m)	183 lb (83 kg)	2002-11-26	Bow, New Hampshire	Quinnipiac (ECAC)	MIN, 182nd overall 2021
24	(United States)	Luke Hause	Freshman	D	6' 4" (1.93 m)	194 lb (88 kg)	2004-03-24	Saint Paul, Minnesota	Kenai River Brown Bears (NAHL)	—
26	(Canada)	Isaac Lambert	Sophomore	F	6' 0" (1.83 m)	165 lb (75 kg)	2003-08-28	Victoriaville, Quebec	Salmon Arm Silverbacks (BCHL)	—
27	(Canada)	Dylan Kinch	Freshman	F	5' 11" (1.8 m)	185 lb (84 kg)	2004-12-25	Salzburg, Austria	Nanaimo Clippers (BCHL)	—
28	(Canada)	Garrett Valk	Junior	D	6' 3" (1.91 m)	205 lb (93 kg)	2002-10-20	North Vancouver, British Columbia	Langley Rivermen (BCHL)	—
29	(Canada)	Jaden Dyke	Freshman	G	6' 4" (1.93 m)	205 lb (93 kg)	2004-08-06	St. John's, Newfoundland	Rochester Jr. Americans (NAHL)	—
30	(Slovakia)	Daniel Duris	Sophomore	G	6' 1" (1.85 m)	181 lb (82 kg)	2003-08-15	Martin, Slovakia	Oklahoma Warriors (NAHL)	—
31	(United States)	Carter Bickle	Freshman	G	6' 1" (1.85 m)	181 lb (82 kg)	2004-05-27	Brooklin, Ontario	Milton Menace (OJHL)	—
37	(Canada)	Lukas Renaud	Freshman	G	6' 2" (1.88 m)	194 lb (88 kg)	2004-01-06	Montréal, Quebec	Calgary Canucks (AJHL)	—
38	(United States)	J. R. Perdion	Sophomore	F	5' 11" (1.8 m)	181 lb (82 kg)	2003-06-25	Strongsville, Ohio	Prince George Spruce Kings (BCHL)	—
48	(United States)	Nick Bernardo	Sophomore	D	5' 9" (1.75 m)	174 lb (79 kg)	2003-05-13	Hauppauge, New York	Maine Nordiques (NAHL)	—
52	(Finland)	Onni Leppänen	Junior	F	5' 8" (1.73 m)	165 lb (75 kg)	2003-12-01	Helsinki, Finland	Jokerit U20 (U20 SM-sarja)	—
55	(Canada)	Brett Rylance (A)	Senior	F	5' 9" (1.75 m)	167 lb (76 kg)	2001-08-03	Edmonton, Alberta	American International (AHA)	—
67	(Canada)	Casey McDonald (C)	Senior	F	6' 1" (1.85 m)	187 lb (85 kg)	2001-05-10	Plenty, Saskatchewan	American International (AHA)	—
91	(Canada)	Noah Serdachny	Senior	F	6' 1" (1.85 m)	190 lb (86 kg)	2003-03-09	Edmonton, Alberta	American International (AHA)	—

== Standings ==
2025–26 NCAA Division I Independent ice hockey standings
	Overall record					
	GP	W	L	T	GF	GA
Alaska*	33	15	15	3	96	99
Alaska Anchorage	33	5	27	1	57	134
Lindenwood	30	15	15	0	105	114
Long Island	33	14	18	1	105	112
Stonehill	35	10	22	3	88	118
Championship: March 7, 2026 * indicates tournament champion Rankings: USCHO.com Top 20 Poll

== Schedule and results ==
Date	Time	Opponent^{#}	Rank^{#}	Site	TV	Decision	Result	Attendance	Record
Exhibition
October 3	5:00 pm	at Army*		Tate Rink • West Point, New York (Exhibition)	FloHockey	Duris	W 3–0	1,573	
Regular Season
October 4	6:00 pm	at #2 Boston University*		Agganis Arena • Boston, Massachusetts	ESPN+, TSN+	Duris	L 2–4	5,170	0–1–0
October 10	7:00 pm	at Canisius*		LECOM Harborcenter • Buffalo, New York	FloHockey	Bickle	L 2–3	670	0–2–0
October 11	7:00 pm	at Canisius*		LECOM Harborcenter • Buffalo, New York	FloHockey	Duris	W 6–1	467	1–2–0
October 17	7:00 pm	at #6 Penn State*		Pegula Ice Arena • University Park, Pennsylvania	BTN+	Duris	L 4–5 ^{OT}	6,449	1–3–0
October 18	6:00 pm	at #6 Penn State*		Pegula Ice Arena • University Park, Pennsylvania	BTN+	Duris	L 0–3	6,428	1–4–0
October 24	7:00 pm	at New Hampshire*		Whittemore Center • Durham, New Hampshire	ESPN+	Duris	L 2–3 ^{OT}	5,234	1–5–0
October 25	7:00 pm	at Merrimack*		J. Thom Lawler Rink • North Andover, Massachusetts	ESPN+	Duris	W 5–2	1,787	2–5–0
October 27	2:00 pm	Simon Fraser*		Northwell Health Ice Center • East Meadow, New York (Exhibition)	FloHockey	Duris	W 3–2		
October 30	7:00 pm	Maryville*		Northwell Health Ice Center • East Meadow, New York (Exhibition)	FloHockey	Bickle	W 9–3	250	
October 31	7:00 pm	Maryville*		Northwell Health Ice Center • East Meadow, New York (Exhibition)	FloHockey	Renaud	W 3–1	127	
November 7	7:00 pm	at Robert Morris*		Clearview Arena • Neville Township, Pennsylvania	FloHockey	Duris	W 6–3	675	3–5–0
November 8	7:00 pm	at Robert Morris*		Clearview Arena • Neville Township, Pennsylvania	FloHockey	Duris	W 2–0	581	4–5–0
November 14	8:00 pm	at Minnesota*		3M Arena at Mariucci • Minneapolis, Minnesota		Duris	W 6–2	8,708	5–5–0
November 15	6:00 pm	at Minnesota*		3M Arena at Mariucci • Minneapolis, Minnesota		Duris	L 3–6	8,704	5–6–0
November 21	7:00 pm	Merrimack*		Northwell Health Ice Center • East Meadow, New York	FloHockey	Duris	L 2–6	600	5–7–0
November 22	5:00 pm	at Sacred Heart*		Martire Family Arena • Fairfield, Connecticut	FloHockey	Bickle	L 2–7	2,543	5–8–0
November 28	8:40 pm	at Lindenwood*		Centene Community Ice Center • St. Charles, Missouri		Duris	L 2–5	901	5–9–0
November 29	7:10 pm	at Lindenwood*		Centene Community Ice Center • St. Charles, Missouri		Duris	W 5–2	894	6–9–0
December 5	2:30 pm	Assumption*		Northwell Health Ice Center • East Meadow, New York	FloHockey	Duris	W 8–3	150	7–9–0
December 13	6:00 pm	at Merrimack*		J. Thom Lawler Rink • North Andover, Massachusetts	ESPN+	Duris	L 2–4	1,738	7–10–0
December 28	5:00 pm	Army*		Northwell Health Ice Center • East Meadow, New York	FloHockey	Duris	T 4–4 ^{OT}	600	7–10–1
December 31	3:00 pm	at #11 Connecticut*		Toscano Family Ice Forum • Storrs, Connecticut	ESPN+	Duris	L 1–4	2,513	7–11–1
January 3	2:00 pm	#11 Connecticut*		Northwell Health Ice Center • East Meadow, New York	FloHockey	Duris	L 1–3	656	7–12–1
January 11	3:00 pm	Stonehill*		Bridgewater Ice Arena • Bridgewater, Massachusetts	NEC Front Row	Duris	W 3–2	239	8–12–1
January 23	11:00 pm	at Alaska Anchorage*		Avis Alaska Sports Complex • Anchorage, Alaska		Duris	W 6–2	771	9–12–1
January 24	9:00 pm	at Alaska Anchorage*		Avis Alaska Sports Complex • Anchorage, Alaska		Duris	W 4–0	835	10–12–1
January 27	11:00 pm	at Alaska Anchorage*		Avis Alaska Sports Complex • Anchorage, Alaska		Duris	W 4–3	273	11–12–1
January 30	11:00 pm	at Alaska*		Carlson Center • Fairbanks, Alaska	FloHockey	Duris	L 1–5	1,887	11–13–1
January 31	11:00 pm	at Alaska*		Carlson Center • Fairbanks, Alaska	FloHockey	Duris	L 1–5	2,185	11–14–1
February 13	2:00 pm	Stonehill*		Northwell Health Ice Center • East Meadow, New York	FloHockey	Duris	L 1–3	519	11–15–1
February 14	2:00 pm	Stonehill*		Northwell Health Ice Center • East Meadow, New York	FloHockey	Duris	W 5–3	627	12–15–1
February 20	7:00 pm	at Stonehill*		Warrior Ice Arena • Boston, Massachusetts	NEC Front Row	Duris	L 1–5	185	12–16–1
February 21	7:00 pm	at Stonehill*		Warrior Ice Arena • Boston, Massachusetts	NEC Front Row	Duris	L 2–3	232	12–17–1
United Collegiate Hockey Cup
March 5	8:00 pm	at Lindenwood*		Centene Community Ice Center • St. Charles, Missouri (UCHC Semifinal)	FloHockey	Duris	L 4–5	512	12–18–1
March 6	8:00 pm	vs. Alaska Anchorage*		Centene Community Ice Center • St. Charles, Missouri (UCHC Consolation Semifinal)	FloHockey	Duris	W 4–3 ^{OT}	486	13–18–1
March 7	4:00 pm	vs. Stonehill*		Centene Community Ice Center • St. Charles, Missouri (UCHC Third Place Game)	FloHockey	Duris	W 4–3	378	14–18–1
*Non-conference game. ^{#}Rankings from USCHO.com Poll. All times are in Eastern Time. Source:

== Scoring statistics ==
Name	Position	Games	Goals	Assists	Points	PIM
Noah Serdachny	F	33	13	16	29	31
J. R. Perdion	F	33	11	14	25	27
Sixten Jennersjö	LW	33	8	17	25	4
Brett Rylance	C/W	30	11	13	24	10
Dylan Kinch	RW	33	9	15	24	6
Trevor Griebel	D/F	30	2	18	20	18
Nick Bernardo	D	30	8	9	17	14
Isaac Lambert	C	32	10	5	15	22
Nate Benoit	D	31	4	9	13	29
Anthony Lucarelli	C	30	5	7	12	10
Trent Powell	D	33	1	10	11	16
Onni Leppänen	C/W	24	4	6	10	35
Casey McDonald	F	31	4	6	10	37
Jaden Dyke	C/W	33	3	7	10	8
Luca Leighton	F	20	4	2	6	18
Daniel Baldassarra	C	16	3	2	5	4
Brennan Nelson	F	27	2	3	5	10
Garrett Valk	D	31	1	4	5	30
Chad Muller	RW	13	1	2	3	16
Blake Matheson	D	24	0	3	3	2
Blake Dangos	D	32	0	3	3	37
John McMahon	F	6	1	0	1	0
Jack Darby	D	13	0	1	1	0
Carter Bickle	G	3	0	0	0	0
Lukas Renaud	G	5	0	0	0	0
Heath Armstrong	F	10	0	0	0	0
Daniel Duris	G	31	0	0	0	0
Total			105	172	277	398

== Goaltending statistics ==
Name	Games	Minutes	Wins	Losses	Ties	Goals against	Saves	Shut outs	SV %	GAA
Lukas Renaud	7	113:28	0	0	0	5	39	0	.886	2.64
Daniel Duris	31	1769:45	14	16	1	97	870	2	.900	3.29
Carter Bickle	5	104:00	0	2	0	9	43	0	.827	5.19
Empty Net	-	10:49	-	-	-	1	-	-	-	-
Total	33	1998:02	14	18	1	112	952	2	.895	3.36

== Rankings ==
Poll	Week																											
Poll	Pre	1	2	3	4	5	6	7	8	9	10	11	12	13	14	15	16	17	18	19	20	21	22	23	24	25	26	27 (Final)
USCHO.com	NR	NR	NR	NR	NR	NR	NR	NR	NR	NR	NR	NR	–	NR	NR	NR	NR	NR	NR	NR	NR	NR	NR	NR	NR	NR	NR	NR
USA Hockey	NR	NR	NR	NR	NR	NR	RV	NR	NR	NR	NR	NR	–	NR	NR	NR	NR	NR	NR	NR	NR	NR	NR	NR	NR	NR	NR	NR

Note: USCHO did not release a poll in week 12.
Note: USA Hockey did not release a poll in week 12.
