= 2023–24 LIU Sharks men's ice hockey season =

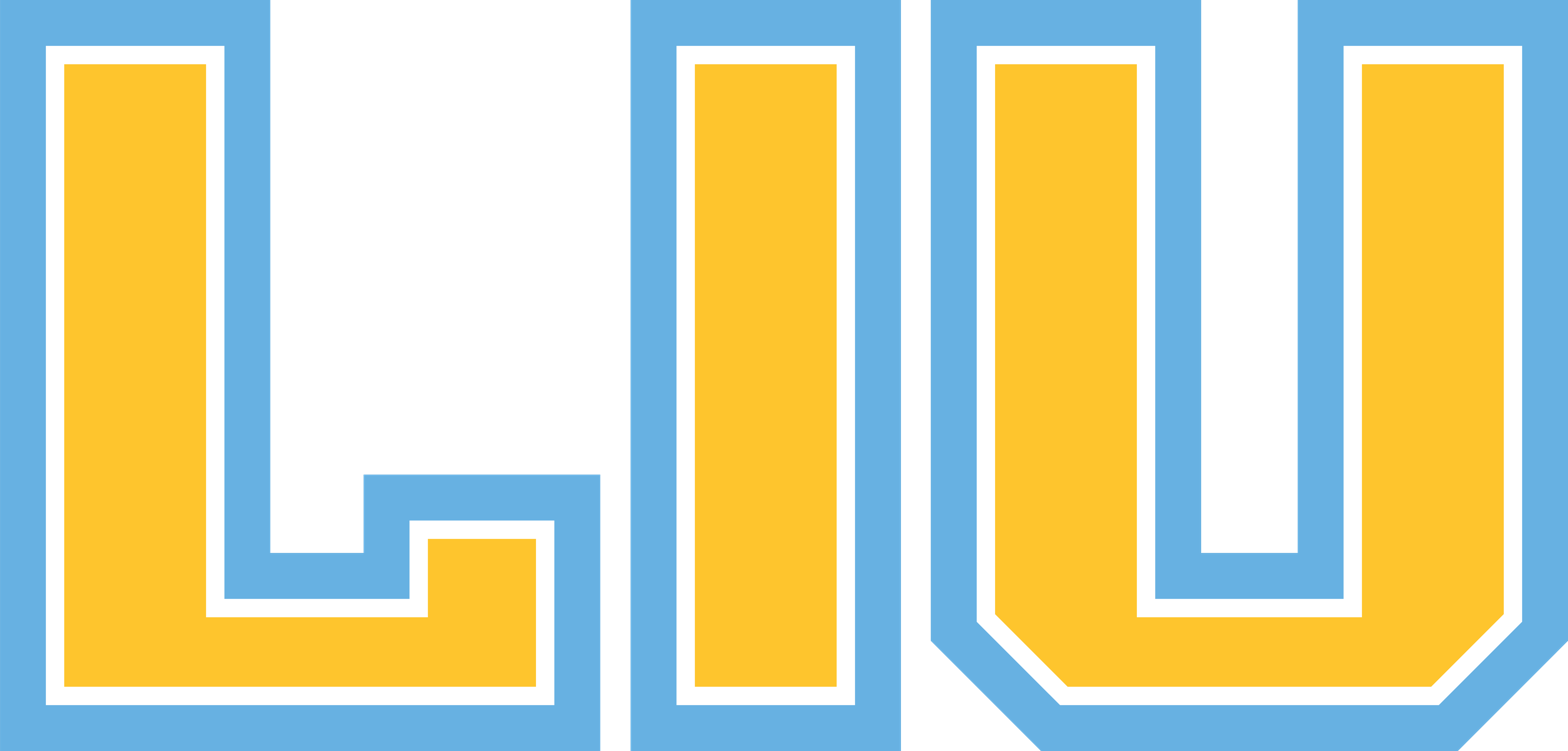
- Conference: Independent
- Home ice: Northwell Health Ice Center

Rankings
- USCHO: NR
- USA Hockey: NR

Record
- Overall: 16–20–1
- Home: 8–6–0
- Road: 8–14–1

Coaches and captains
- Head coach: Brett Riley
- Assistant coaches: Will Messa; Andrew Veglucci; Gehrig Sarosy

The 2023–24 LIU Sharks men's ice hockey season was the 4th season of play for the program. The Sharks represented Long Island University and were coached by Brett Riley, in his 4th season.

== Season ==
While LIU was hoping to take the next step in their fourth season, the team was still largely unable to move forward. Long Island's start to the season looked promising as they played two close games against ranked opponents (both losses) and produced some good offense against Stonehill, that pattern didn't change throughout the year. The Sharks got a solid effort from starter Brandon Perrone throughout the season but it wasn't quite good enough to overcome decent teams. Similarly, the offense produced consistently; Josh Zary became the first LIU player to hit 20 goals for a season and the Sharks had five skaters with at least 30 points. However, the team came up just shy too often, losing eight games by 1 goal. LIU's numbers were offset by the eight games the team had against Stonehill, the worst team in college hockey. In those matches, Long Island went 8–0 and scored 48 goals while allowing just 12. The season series with the Skyhawks enabled LIU to set a program record with 16 wins but still left them sitting near the bottom of the PairWise rankings.

== Departures ==
Player	Position	Nationality	Cause
Spencer Cox	Defenseman/Forward	United States	Transferred to Miami
Adam Goodsir	Forward	United States	Graduation (signed with Worcester Railers)
Santeri Hartikainen	Forward	Finland	Graduation (signed with Kiekko-Vantaa)
Tyler Kostelecky	Forward	United States	Transferred to Bethel
Patriks Marcinkēvičs	Forward	Latvia	Transferred to Michigan Tech
Ethan Martini	Defenseman	Canada	Transferred to Dalhousie
Gustav Müller	Forward	Sweden	Left program (retired)
Vinnie Purpura	Goaltender	United States	Graduation (signed with Adirondack Thunder)
Austin Rook	Defenseman	United States	Graduation (signed with Adirondack Thunder)
Dylan Schuett	Forward	Canada	Left program (retired)
Jan Škorpík	Goaltender	Czech Republic	Left program (retired)
Anthony Vincent	Forward	United States	Graduation (signed with San Jose Barracuda)

== Recruiting ==
Player	Position	Nationality	Age	Notes
Heath Armstrong	Forward	Canada	21	Calgary, AB
Grayson Constable	Forward	Canada	25	Lethbridge, AB; graduate transfer from Holy Cross
Rico DiMatteo	Goaltender	United States	22	Brasher Falls, NY; transfer from Northern Michigan
Aaron Grounds	Forward	United States	21	Jamestown, ND; transfer from American International
Atte Lehikoinen	Defenseman	Finland	20	Joensuu, FIN
Onni Leppänen	Forward	Finland	19	Helsinki, FIN
Peter Muzyka	Defenseman	Canada	23	Toronto, ON; graduate transfer from Cornell
Remy Parker	Forward	United States	25	Montclair, NJ; graduate transfer from Union
Kade Peterson	Forward	United States	20	West Fargo, ND
Adam Pitters	Forward	United States	24	Grosse Pointe, MI; graduate transfer from Bowling Green
Noah Rupprecht	Goaltender	United States	21	Thief River Falls, MN
Luke Strickland	Forward	Canada	20	Keswick, ON
Garrett Valk	Defenseman	Canada	20	North Vancouver, BC

== Roster ==
As of September 20, 2023.

No.	Nat.	Player	Class	Pos	Height	Weight	DoB	Hometown	Previous team	NHL rights
2	(Canada)	Peter Muzyka	Graduate	D	6' 3" (1.91 m)	194 lb (88 kg)	2000-05-14	Toronto, Ontario	Cornell (ECAC)	—
3	(United States)	A. J. Casperson	Sophomore	D	6' 2" (1.88 m)	190 lb (86 kg)	2001-07-19	Flower Mound, Texas	Janesville Jets (NAHL)	—
4	(Finland)	Atte Lehikoinen	Freshman	D	6' 3" (1.91 m)	205 lb (93 kg)	2003-07-05	Joensuu, Finland	Tappara U20 (U20 SM-sarja)	—
5	(Finland)	Valtteri Piironen	Sophomore	D	6' 4" (1.93 m)	201 lb (91 kg)	2001-09-11	Joensuu, Finland	Sioux Falls Stampede (USHL)	—
6	(Canada)	Cade Mason	Sophomore	D	5' 11" (1.8 m)	176 lb (80 kg)	2001-08-26	Red Deer, Alberta	Spruce Grove Saints (AJHL)	—
7	(Canada)	Jordan Di Cicco	Senior	D	5' 9" (1.75 m)	180 lb (82 kg)	1999-03-17	London, Ontario	Brooks Bandits (AJHL)	—
8	(Canada)	Isaiah Fox	Junior	F	5' 11" (1.8 m)	163 lb (74 kg)	2000-07-05	Montreal, Quebec	Maine Nordiques (NAHL)	—
9	(Canada)	Daniel Baldassarra	Sophomore	F	5' 10" (1.78 m)	170 lb (77 kg)	2002-03-15	Woodbridge, Ontario	North York Rangers (OJHL)	—
10	(Canada)	Heath Armstrong	Freshman	F	5' 8" (1.73 m)	172 lb (78 kg)	2002-05-12	Calgary, Alberta	Brooks Bandits (AJHL)	—
11	(Canada)	Chris Pappas	Junior	F	5' 11" (1.8 m)	175 lb (79 kg)	2000-11-26	Toronto, Ontario	St. Lawrence (ECAC)	—
12	(United States)	Zachary Nazzarett	Senior	F	5' 8" (1.73 m)	155 lb (70 kg)	2000-08-25	Cheektowaga, New York	New Jersey Titans (NAHL)	—
13	(Canada)	Josh Zary	Sophomore	F	6' 0" (1.83 m)	190 lb (86 kg)	2001-10-15	Nanaimo, British Columbia	Alberni Valley Bulldogs (BCHL)	—
14	(Canada)	Luke Strickland	Freshman	F	6' 0" (1.83 m)	192 lb (87 kg)	2002-10-16	Keswick, Ontario	Wellington Dukes (OJHL)	—
15	(Canada)	Grayson Constable	Graduate	F	6' 2" (1.88 m)	201 lb (91 kg)	1998-05-05	Lethbridge, Alberta	Holy Cross (AHA)	—
16	(United States)	Xan Gurney	Sophomore (RS)	D	6' 3" (1.91 m)	205 lb (93 kg)	2000-05-28	Grosse Ile, Michigan	Western Michigan (NCHC)	—
17	(Canada)	Nolan Welsh	Senior	F	6' 0" (1.83 m)	185 lb (84 kg)	1999-06-23	Whistler, British Columbia	Prince George Spruce Kings (BCHL)	—
18	(United States)	Kade Peterson	Freshman	F	6' 1" (1.85 m)	190 lb (86 kg)	2003-05-03	West Fargo, North Dakota	St. Cloud Norsemen (NAHL)	—
19	(United States)	Jack Quinn	Senior	F	5' 10" (1.78 m)	185 lb (84 kg)	1999-12-28	Lancaster, Massachusetts	Kenai River Brown Bears (NAHL)	—
20	(United States)	Adam Pitters	Graduate	F	5' 11" (1.8 m)	180 lb (82 kg)	1999-02-09	Grosse Pointe, Michigan	Bowling Green (CCHA)	—
21	(Canada)	Austin Brimmer	Sophomore	F	6' 3" (1.91 m)	218 lb (99 kg)	2001-10-10	Markham, Ontario	Shreveport Mudbugs (ECAC)	—
22	(Canada)	Riley Wallack	Sophomore	F	6' 5" (1.96 m)	225 lb (102 kg)	2001-04-05	South Surrey, British Columbia	Langley Rivermen (BCHL)	—
23	(United States)	Aaron Grounds	Senior	F	6' 3" (1.91 m)	190 lb (86 kg)	1999-12-24	Jamestown, North Dakota	American International (AHA)	—
24	(United States)	John Gormley	Junior	D	6' 4" (1.93 m)	225 lb (102 kg)	2000-08-19	Bronx, New York	Bismarck Bobcats (NAHL)	—
25	(Canada)	Preston Brodziak	Senior	F	6' 0" (1.83 m)	185 lb (84 kg)	1999-06-29	Estevan, Saskatchewan	Prince George Spruce Kings (BCHL)	—
27	(United States)	Remy Parker	Graduate	F	6' 3" (1.91 m)	184 lb (83 kg)	1998-04-27	Montclair, New Jersey	Utica (UCHC)	—
28	(Canada)	Garrett Valk	Freshman	D	6' 3" (1.91 m)	205 lb (93 kg)	2002-10-20	North Vancouver, British Columbia	Langley Rivermen (BCHL)	—
31	(United States)	Noah Rupprecht	Freshman	G	5' 11" (1.8 m)	180 lb (82 kg)	2002-06-15	Thief River Falls, Minnesota	Minot Minotauros (NAHL)	—
33	(United States)	Rico DiMatteo	Junior (RS)	G	6' 3" (1.91 m)	161 lb (73 kg)	2001-01-01	Brasher Falls, New York	Northern Michigan (CCHA)	—
35	(United States)	Brandon Perrone	Graduate	G	5' 10" (1.78 m)	165 lb (75 kg)	1998-10-26	Smithtown, New York	Alaska Anchorage (WCHA)	—
44	(United States)	Noah Kane	Senior	F	5' 11" (1.8 m)	183 lb (83 kg)	1999-11-27	Buffalo, New York	Mercyhurst (AHA)	—
52	(Finland)	Onni Leppänen	Freshman	F	5' 8" (1.73 m)	165 lb (75 kg)	2003-12-01	Helsinki, Finland	Jokerit U20 (U20 SM-sarja)	—

== Standings ==
2023–24 NCAA Division I Independent ice hockey standings
	Overall record					
	GP	W	L	T	GF	GA
Alaska	34	17	14	3	110	86
Alaska Anchorage	34	15	17	2	95	105
Arizona State	38	24	8	6	129	94
Lindenwood	28	6	18	4	74	121
Long Island	37	16	20	1	115	103
Stonehill	36	2	34	0	62	213
Rankings: USCHO.com Top 20 Poll

== Schedule and results ==
Date	Time	Opponent^{#}	Rank^{#}	Site	TV	Decision	Result	Attendance	Record
Regular Season
October 7	7:30 pm	#16 Penn State*		Northwell Health Ice Center • East Meadow, New York	ESPN+	Perrone	L 2–3	1,862	0–1–0
October 8	7:00 pm	at Holy Cross*		Hart Center • Worcester, Massachusetts	FloHockey	DiMatteo	L 2–5	830	0–2–0
October 13	7:00 pm	at #4 Boston College*		Conte Forum • Chestnut Hill, Massachusetts	ESPN+	Perrone	L 2–4	7,308	0–3–0
October 14	5:00 pm	at Stonehill*		Bridgewater Ice Arena • Bridgewater, Massachusetts	NEC Front Row	DiMatteo	W 7–3	275	1–3–0
October 20	9:00 pm	at Colorado College*		Ed Robson Arena • Colorado Springs, Colorado		Perrone	L 2–3	3,412	1–4–0
October 21	8:00 pm	at Colorado College*		Ed Robson Arena • Colorado Springs, Colorado		DiMatteo	L 2–4	3,407	1–5–0
October 28	8:00 pm	Saint Anselm*		Northwell Health Ice Center • East Meadow, New York	ESPN+, SNY	Perrone	W 4–0	314	2–5–0
October 30	7:30 pm	at Stonehill*		Bridgewater Ice Arena • Bridgewater, Massachusetts	NEC Front Row	DiMatteo	W 4–2	183	3–5–0
November 5	7:00 pm	Sacred Heart*		Northwell Health Ice Center • East Meadow, New York	ESPN+	Perrone	W 2–1	349	4–5–0
November 10	8:07 pm	at Omaha*		Baxter Arena • Omaha, Nebraska		Perrone	L 2–3	7,802	4–6–0
November 11	8:07 pm	at Omaha*		Baxter Arena • Omaha, Nebraska		Perrone	L 4–5 ^{OT}	7,802	4–7–0
November 17	8:10 pm	at Lindenwood*		Centene Community Ice Center • St. Charles, Missouri		Perrone	L 0–3	857	4–8–0
November 18	3:10 pm	at Lindenwood*		Centene Community Ice Center • St. Charles, Missouri		DiMatteo	W 6–2	635	5–8–0
November 24	7:30 pm	American International*		Northwell Health Ice Center • East Meadow, New York	ESPN+, SNY	Perrone	L 2–5	550	5–9–0
November 25	7:00 pm	Simon Fraser*		Northwell Health Ice Center • East Meadow, New York (Exhibition)	ESPN+, SNY	DiMatteo	W 3–1	325	
November 28	6:00 pm	at Saint Anselm*		Thomas F. Sullivan Ice Arena • Manchester, New Hampshire		DiMatteo	L 2–3	207	5–10–0
December 1	7:00 pm	at Brown*		Meehan Auditorium • Providence, Rhode Island	ESPN+	Perrone	T 2–2 ^{OT}	464	5–10–1
December 2	7:00 pm	at Yale*		Ingalls Rink • New Haven, Connecticut	ESPN+	Perrone	W 3–1	1,029	6–10–1
December 9	7:00 pm	at #5 Quinnipiac*		M&T Bank Arena • Hamden, Connecticut	ESPN+	Perrone	L 2–4	3,087	6–11–1
December 10	7:00 pm	at Yale*		Ingalls Rink • New Haven, Connecticut	ESPN+	Perrone	L 3–5	866	6–12–1
December 16	7:00 pm	Vermont*		Northwell Health Ice Center • East Meadow, New York	ESPN+	Perrone	L 2–3	700	6–13–1
December 17	7:15 pm	Vermont*		Northwell Health Ice Center • East Meadow, New York	ESPN+	DiMatteo	L 1–5	350	6–14–1
January 12	7:00 pm	Colgate*		Northwell Health Ice Center • East Meadow, New York	ESPN+	Rupprecht	W 3–2 ^{OT}	650	7–14–1
January 13	2:00 pm	Colgate*		Northwell Health Ice Center • East Meadow, New York	ESPN+	Rupprecht	W 3–2 ^{OT}	450	8–14–1
January 19	2:30 pm	Stonehill*		Northwell Health Ice Center • East Meadow, New York	ESPN+	Rupprecht	W 8–2	250	9–14–1
January 20	2:00 pm	Stonehill*		Northwell Health Ice Center • East Meadow, New York	ESPN+	Rupprecht	W 10–0	300	10–14–1
January 26	2:30 pm	Alaska*		Northwell Health Ice Center • East Meadow, New York	ESPN+	Rupprecht	L 3–7	255	10–15–1
January 27	2:00 pm	Alaska*		Northwell Health Ice Center • East Meadow, New York	ESPN+	Perrone	L 1–3	350	10–16–1
February 2	7:00 pm	at Stonehill*		Bridgewater Ice Arena • Bridgewater, Massachusetts	NEC Front Row	Rupprecht	W 3–1	153	11–16–1
February 3	4:00 pm	at Stonehill*		Bridgewater Ice Arena • Bridgewater, Massachusetts	NEC Front Row	Perrone	W 5–0	198	12–16–1
February 10	10:07 pm	at Alaska Anchorage*		Avis Alaska Sports Complex • Anchorage, Alaska		Perrone	W 2–1	800	13–16–1
February 11	9:07 pm	at Alaska Anchorage*		Avis Alaska Sports Complex • Anchorage, Alaska		Rupprecht	L 1–3	562	13–17–1
February 16	11:07 pm	at Alaska*		Carlson Center • Fairbanks, Alaska	FloHockey	Perrone	W 4–0	2,024	14–17–1
February 17	11:07 pm	at Alaska*		Carlson Center • Fairbanks, Alaska	FloHockey	Perrone	L 0–4	1,776	14–18–1
February 23	2:30 pm	Stonehill*		Northwell Health Ice Center • East Meadow, New York	ESPN+	Perrone	W 7–2	300	15–18–1
February 24	2:00 pm	Stonehill*		Northwell Health Ice Center • East Meadow, New York	ESPN+	Perrone	W 4–2	300	16–18–1
March 1	9:00 pm	at #20 Arizona State*		Mullett Arena • Tempe, Arizona		Perrone	L 2–4	4,951	16–19–1
March 2	7:00 pm	at #20 Arizona State*		Mullett Arena • Tempe, Arizona		Perrone	L 3–4	4,774	16–20–1
*Non-conference game. ^{#}Rankings from USCHO.com Poll. All times are in Eastern Time. Source:

== Scoring statistics ==
Name	Position	Games	Goals	Assists	Points	PIM
Josh Zary	F	35	20	14	34	21
Isaiah Fox	F	37	14	20	34	66
Chris Pappas	C	34	11	20	31	10
Noah Kane	C	33	8	22	30	48
Cade Mason	D	34	2	28	30	8
Remy Parker	F	35	13	6	19	6
Grayson Constable	F	37	9	9	18	29
Austin Brimmer	RW	32	7	8	15	12
Nolan Welsh	F	32	6	9	15	21
Valtteri Piironen	D	31	3	9	12	18
Zachary Nazzarett	LW	19	3	9	12	4
Adam Pitters	F	31	4	5	9	10
Jack Quinn	F	34	2	6	8	31
Preston Brodziak	F	29	3	4	7	10
Jordan Di Cicco	D	33	2	5	7	4
Aaron Grounds	F	13	2	2	4	18
Riley Wallack	F	30	2	2	4	8
John Gormley	D	37	1	3	4	61
Garrett Valk	D	36	2	1	3	14
Peter Muzyka	D	35	0	3	3	70
Xan Gurney	D	13	1	2	3	36
A. J. Casperson	D	12	0	1	1	2
Heath Armstrong	F	9	0	1	1	0
Brandon Perrone	G	25	0	1	1	2
Atte Lehikoinen	D	7	0	0	0	2
Daniel Baldassarra	C	9	0	0	0	4
Noah Rupprecht	G	8	0	0	0	0
Kade Peterson	F	9	0	0	0	4
Rico DiMatteo	G	9	0	0	0	0
Luke Strickland	LW	1	0	0	0	0
Total			115	190	305	519

== Goaltending statistics ==
Name	Games	Minutes	Wins	Losses	Ties	Goals against	Saves	Shut outs	SV %	GAA
Noah Rupprecht	10	421:40	5	2	0	15	135	1	.900	2.13
Brandon Perrone	25	1375:43	8	14	1	63	535	3	.895	2.75
Rico DiMatteo	11	403:14	3	4	0	20	139	0	.874	2.98
Empty Net	-	31:59	-	-	-	5	-	-	-	-
Total	37	2232:36	16	20	1	103	809	4	.887	2.77

== Rankings ==
Poll	Week																										
Poll	Pre	1	2	3	4	5	6	7	8	9	10	11	12	13	14	15	16	17	18	19	20	21	22	23	24	25	26 (Final)
USCHO.com	NR	NR	NR	NR	NR	NR	NR	NR	NR	NR	NR	–	NR	NR	NR	NR	NR	NR	NR	NR	NR	NR	NR	NR	NR	–	NR
USA Hockey	NR	NR	NR	NR	NR	NR	NR	NR	NR	NR	NR	NR	–	NR	NR	NR	NR	NR	NR	NR	NR	NR	NR	NR	NR	NR	NR

Note: USCHO did not release a poll in weeks 11 and 25.
Note: USA Hockey did not release a poll in week 12.
