= 2024–25 LIU Sharks men's ice hockey season =

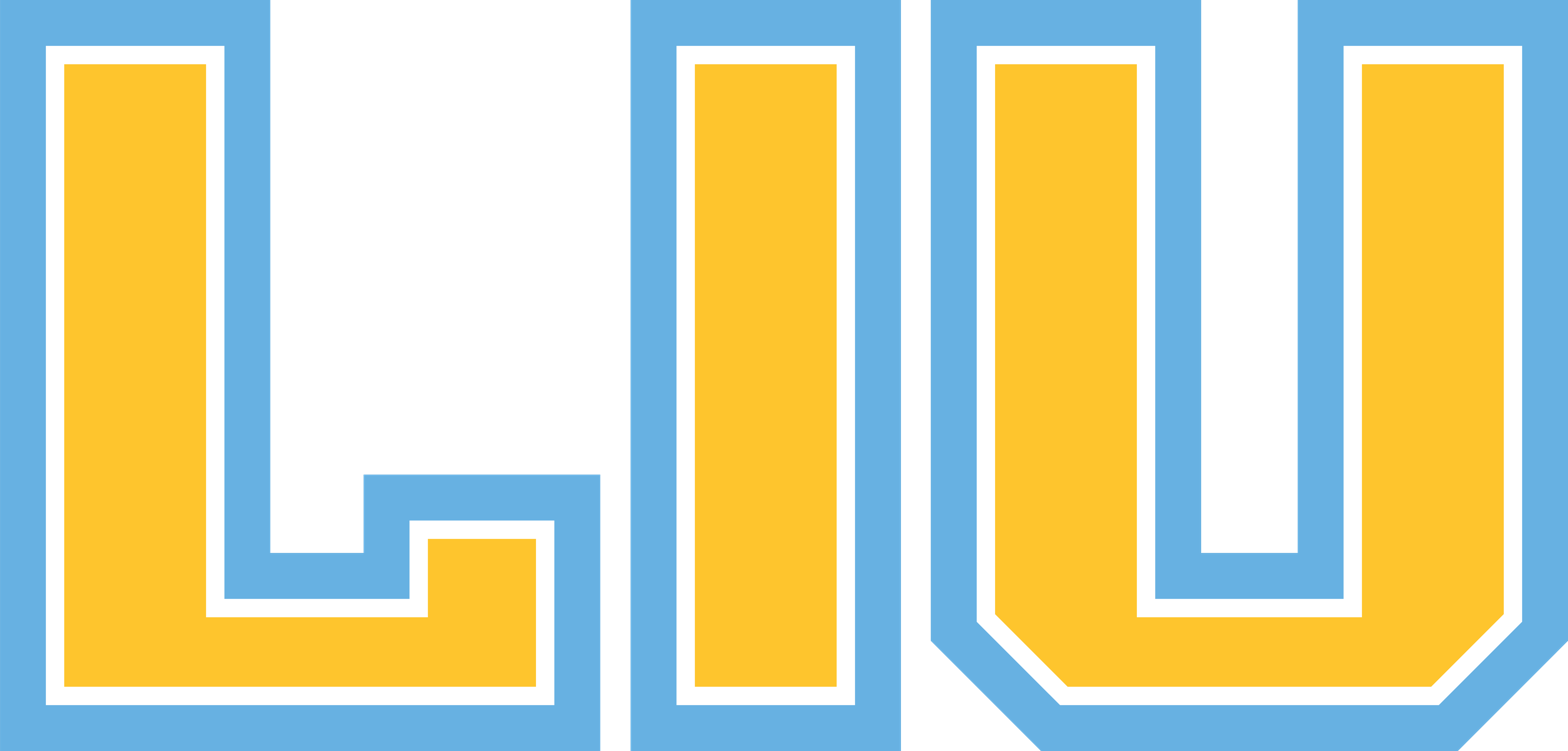
- Conference: Independent
- Home ice: Northwell Health Ice Center

Rankings
- USCHO: NR
- USA Hockey: NR

Record
- Overall: 20–12–2
- Home: 14–1–0
- Road: 6–11–2

Coaches and captains
- Head coach: Brett Riley
- Assistant coaches: Will Messa; Garrett Metcalf; Gehrig Sarosy
- Captain: John Gormley
- Alternate captain(s): Valtteri Piironen; Josh Zary; Connor Gregga; Isaiah Fox; Chris Pappas

The 2024–25 LIU Sharks men's ice hockey season was the 5th season of play for the program. The Sharks represented Long Island University in the 2024–25 NCAA Division I men's ice hockey season, played their home games at the Northwell Health Ice Center and were coached by Brett Riley, in his 5th season.

== Season ==
Long Island had an inauspicious start to its season. After both Noah Rupprecht and the offense failed to show up in the season opener, freshman netminder Daniel Duris got his turn as the starter. He backstopped the Sharks to a win the following night but then the offense vanished for the next three games. In the first game of their series with Notre Dame, Duris was injured while making a save. After being helped off the ice in considerable pain, the team eventually revealed that Duris would be out for the remainder of the year. With Rupprecht back in goal for the foreseeable future, the scoring miraculously reappeared but it was the team's penalty kill that saved the day. Despite handing Notre Dame four power plays in the match, LIU was able to kill off three disadvantages. On top of that, Riley Wallack managed to score a short-handed marker to lift the Sharks over their ranked opponent.

After a week off, the team returned for a match with New Hampshire and the game could hardly have gone worse for the Sharks. After opening the scoring on the power play, the team surrendered the next six goals and were widely outshot in the contest. They had a bit of a reprieve the following week, sweeping Stonehill thanks to five man-advantage goals over the weekend. The wins seemed to awaken something in the team and Long Island fought hard against Providence. The Sharks used two power play goals in the first period to build an early lead and then had to rely on a stellar performance from Rupprecht to keep them in the game. Despite surrendering the lead, Nick Bernardo scored his first of the season with just 19 seconds left in the middle frame to give LIU its second lead. Rupprecht turned aside several chances in the third to preserve the lead but could not stop the Friars once they pulled their goaltender. After Providence tied the game for the second time to force overtime, the home team delighted its fans with a winning goal.

While the team had played well, and were sitting in the top half of the PairWise rankings by the end of November, coach Riley was looking for a spark. Ty Outen, a transfer from Division III Stevenson, was inserted into the starting role against Yale. The Sharks responded by sweeping the weekend thanks mostly to the power play continuing to operate at a high level as well as the defense surrendering just 43 shots in two games. Outen picked up his first shutout in the rematch and continued his steady play against Vermont the following week. Despite a hiccup in the second game where he allowed 6 goals, Outen remained the starter and backstopped the team to two more victories to finish off the first half of their schedule. At that time, the Sharks sat at #21 in the PairWise and were flirting with a potential NCAA tournament bid. However, due to their weak schedule in the second half, the team could ill afford any losses if they wanted to make their first postseason appearance.

Unfortunately, the offense was a no-show after their break and the Sharks went scoreless in the return to play. Rupprecht was reinserted as the starter for the next game and put up his best performance to date, allowing just 1 goal on 24 shots. He remained the starter for the following week when the offense exploded. Long Island scored 24 goals in 2 games at the beginning of January, however, those games both came against Division II opponents. While the individual points were counted, neither game mattered for the national rankings. To make matters worse, the offense regressed the week after and cost the Sharks two winnable games. The losses to Colgate and the succeeding loss to Wisconsin all but ended LIU's chances for the tournament but the team did not give up. In the rematch with the Badgers, Long Island's defense showed out and held Wisconsin to just 24 shots in the game.

Once the Sharks got back from another week-long break, the team began a 5-week stretch to end the season with all of their games coming against fellow independent programs. LIU proved itself to be the best of the lot by going 8–2 to end the season. Forwards Josh Zary and Carter Rapalje were instrumental in leading the team to its first 20-win season by scoring 10 and 9 points respectively down the stretch. As it had all season, the power play was also responsible for much of the scoring with LIU getting at least one goal on the man-advantage in seven of their final ten matches. However, over the previous two seasons, LIU had not had too much trouble scoring. This was the third straight season that the Sharks surpassed 100 goals as a team. The main reason Long Island was able post its first winning record was from the much-improved play in goal. The combined efforts of Rupprecht and Outen enabled the team to cut the team's goal against average by over half a goal (2.77 to 2.25) and put Long Island into close contact with some of the top defensive teams in the country.

== Departures ==
Player	Position	Nationality	Cause
Preston Brodziak	Forward	Canada	Graduate transfer to UNLV
Grayson Constable	Forward	Canada	Graduation (signed with Coventry Blaze)
Jordan Di Cicco	Defenseman	Canada	Graduation (signed with Adirondack Thunder)
Rico DiMatteo	Goaltender	United States	Graduate transfer to New Hampshire
Noah Kane	Forward	United States	Graduation (signed with Cincinnati Cyclones)
Atte Lehikoinen	Defenseman	Finland	Signed professional contract (Kiekko-Pojat)
Peter Muzyka	Defenseman	Canada	Graduation (signed with Rapid City Rush)
Zack Nazzarett	Forward	United States	Graduation (signed with Fayetteville Marksmen)
Remy Parker	Forward	United States	Graduation (signed with Cincinnati Cyclones)
Brandon Perrone	Goaltender	United States	Graduation (signed with Fayetteville Marksmen)
Kade Peterson	Forward	United States	Transferred to Wisconsin-Eau Claire
Adam Pitters	Forward	United States	Graduation (signed with Fayetteville Marksmen)
Jack Quinn	Forward	United States	Graduation (retired)
Luke Strickland	Forward	Canada	Transferred to Nipissing
Nolan Welsh	Forward	Canada	Graduation (signed with Savannah Ghost Pirates)

== Recruiting ==
Player	Position	Nationality	Age	Notes
Nick Bernardo	Defenseman	United States	21	Hauppauge, NY
Daniel Duris	Goaltender	Slovakia	21	Martin, SVK
Connor Gregga	Forward	Canada	24	Markham, ON; graduate transfer from Minnesota State
Sixten Jennersjö	Forward	Sweden	21	Ekerö, SWE
Andrius Kulbis-Marino	Defenseman	United States	24	Methuen, MA; graduate transfer from Sacred Heart
Isaac Lambert	Forward	Canada	21	Victoriaville, QC
Luca Leighton	Forward	United States	21	Old Brookville, NY
Anthony Lucarelli	Forward	Canada	20	Chatham, ON
Chad Muller	Forward	Canada	21	Kingston, ON
Brennan Nelson	Forward	Canada	21	Edmonton, AB
Tyriq Outen	Goaltender	United States	24	Tampa, FL; transfer from Stevenson
J. R. Perdion	Forward	United States	21	Strongsville, OH
Michael Polston	Goaltender	United States	19	Cedarburg, WI
Trenton Powell	Defenseman	United States	20	Soldotna, AK
Carter Rapalje	Forward	United States	23	Burlington, VT; transfer from Stonehill
Nick Trela	Forward	United States	25	Trenton, MI; graduate transfer from St. Lawrence

== Roster ==
As of October 3, 2024.

No.	Nat.	Player	Class	Pos	Height	Weight	DoB	Hometown	Previous team	NHL rights
1	(United States)	Michael Polston	Freshman	G	5' 11" (1.8 m)	170 lb (77 kg)	2004-10-07	Cedarburg, Wisconsin	Provo Predators (NCDC)	—
2	(United States)	Trent Powell	Freshman	D	5' 10" (1.78 m)	185 lb (84 kg)	2004-03-09	Soldotna, Alaska	Anchorage Wolverines (NAHL)	—
3	(United States)	A. J. Casperson	Junior	D	6' 2" (1.88 m)	190 lb (86 kg)	2001-07-19	Flower Mound, Texas	Janesville Jets (NAHL)	—
5	(Finland)	Valtteri Piironen (C)	Junior	D	6' 4" (1.93 m)	201 lb (91 kg)	2001-09-11	Joensuu, Finland	Sioux Falls Stampede (USHL)	—
6	(Canada)	Cade Mason	Junior	D	5' 11" (1.8 m)	176 lb (80 kg)	2001-08-26	Red Deer, Alberta	Spruce Grove Saints (AJHL)	—
8	(Canada)	Isaiah Fox	Senior	F	5' 11" (1.8 m)	163 lb (74 kg)	2000-07-05	Montreal, Quebec	Maine Nordiques (NAHL)	—
9	(Canada)	Daniel Baldassarra	Junior	F	5' 10" (1.78 m)	170 lb (77 kg)	2002-03-15	Woodbridge, Ontario	North York Rangers (OJHL)	—
10	(Canada)	Heath Armstrong	Sophomore	F	5' 8" (1.73 m)	172 lb (78 kg)	2002-05-12	Calgary, Alberta	Brooks Bandits (AJHL)	—
11	(Canada)	Chris Pappas	Senior	F	5' 11" (1.8 m)	175 lb (79 kg)	2000-11-26	Toronto, Ontario	St. Lawrence (ECAC)	—
12	(Canada)	Brennan Nelson	Freshman	F	5' 11" (1.8 m)	205 lb (93 kg)	2003-03-21	Edmonton, Alberta	West Kelowna Warriors (BCHL)	—
13	(Canada)	Josh Zary	Junior	F	6' 0" (1.83 m)	190 lb (86 kg)	2001-10-15	Nanaimo, British Columbia	Alberni Valley Bulldogs (BCHL)	—
15	(United States)	Luca Leighton	Freshman	F	5' 8" (1.73 m)	181 lb (82 kg)	2003-08-13	Old Brookville, New York	Rochester Jr. Americans (NAHL)	—
16	(United States)	Xan Gurney	Junior (RS)	D	6' 3" (1.91 m)	205 lb (93 kg)	2000-05-28	Grosse Ile, Michigan	Western Michigan (NCHC)	—
17	(Sweden)	Sixten Jennersjö	Freshman	F	5' 10" (1.78 m)	179 lb (81 kg)	2003-04-18	Ekerö, Sweden	Northeast Generals (NAHL)	—
18	(Canada)	Anthony Lucarelli	Freshman	F	6' 2" (1.88 m)	190 lb (86 kg)	2003-10-16	Chatham, Ontario	Powell River Kings (BCHL)	—
19	(Canada)	Chad Muller	Freshman	F	6' 1" (1.85 m)	190 lb (86 kg)	2003-07-13	Kingston, Ontario	Minot Minotauros (NAHL)	—
20	(United States)	Nicholas Trela	Graduate	F	6' 2" (1.88 m)	185 lb (84 kg)	1999-08-26	Trenton, Michigan	St. Lawrence (ECAC)	—
21	(Canada)	Austin Brimmer	Junior	F	6' 3" (1.91 m)	218 lb (99 kg)	2001-10-10	Markham, Ontario	Shreveport Mudbugs (ECAC)	—
22	(Canada)	Riley Wallack	Junior	F	6' 5" (1.96 m)	225 lb (102 kg)	2001-04-05	South Surrey, British Columbia	Langley Rivermen (BCHL)	—
23	(United States)	Aaron Grounds	Graduate	F	6' 3" (1.91 m)	190 lb (86 kg)	1999-12-24	Jamestown, North Dakota	American International (AHA)	—
24	(United States)	John Gormley (C)	Senior	D	6' 4" (1.93 m)	225 lb (102 kg)	2000-08-19	Bronx, New York	Bismarck Bobcats (NAHL)	—
26	(Canada)	Isaac Lambert	Freshman	F	6' 0" (1.83 m)	165 lb (75 kg)	2003-08-28	Victoriaville, Quebec	Salmon Arm Silverbacks (BCHL)	—
27	(United States)	Andrius Kulbis-Marino	Graduate	D	6' 0" (1.83 m)	184 lb (83 kg)	2000-02-16	Methuen, Massachusetts	Sacred Heart (AHA)	—
28	(Canada)	Garrett Valk	Sophomore	D	6' 3" (1.91 m)	205 lb (93 kg)	2002-10-20	North Vancouver, British Columbia	Langley Rivermen (BCHL)	—
29	(United States)	Tyriq Outen	Junior	G	6' 3" (1.91 m)	179 lb (81 kg)	2000-08-16	Tampa, Florida	Stevenson (UCHC)	—
30	(Slovakia)	Daniel Duris	Freshman	G	6' 1" (1.85 m)	181 lb (82 kg)	2003-08-15	Martin, Slovakia	Oklahoma Warriors (NAHL)	—
31	(United States)	Noah Rupprecht	Sophomore	G	5' 11" (1.8 m)	180 lb (82 kg)	2002-06-15	Thief River Falls, Minnesota	Minot Minotauros (NAHL)	—
34	(United States)	Carter Rapalje	Sophomore (RS)	F	5' 10" (1.78 m)	170 lb (77 kg)	2001-08-10	Colorado Springs, Colorado	Stonehill (NCAA)	—
38	(United States)	J. R. Perdion	Freshman	F	5' 11" (1.8 m)	181 lb (82 kg)	2003-06-25	Strongsville, Ohio	Prince George Spruce Kings (BCHL)	—
39	(Canada)	Connor Gregga	Graduate	F	5' 10" (1.78 m)	177 lb (80 kg)	2000-07-24	Markham, Ontario	Minnesota State (CCHA)	—
48	(United States)	Nick Bernardo	Freshman	D	5' 9" (1.75 m)	174 lb (79 kg)	2003-05-13	Hauppauge, New York	Maine Nordiques (NAHL)	—
52	(Finland)	Onni Leppänen	Sophomore	F	5' 8" (1.73 m)	165 lb (75 kg)	2003-12-01	Helsinki, Finland	Jokerit U20 (U20 SM-sarja)	—

== Standings ==
2024–25 NCAA Division I Independent ice hockey standings
	Overall record					
	GP	W	L	T	GF	GA
Alaska	32	12	14	6	73	87
Alaska Anchorage	34	6	23	5	75	117
Lindenwood	32	8	22	2	65	86
Long Island	34	20	12	2	111	77
Stonehill	34	12	22	0	76	106
Rankings: USCHO.com Top 20 Poll

== Schedule and results ==
Date	Time	Opponent^{#}	Rank^{#}	Site	TV	Decision	Result	Attendance	Record
Exhibition
October 5	7:30 pm	Simon Fraser*		Northwell Health Ice Center • East Meadow, New York (Exhibition)	ESPN+		W 7–5		
Regular Season
October 11	8:07 pm	at Augustana*		Midco Arena • Sioux Falls, South Dakota	Midco Sports+	Rupprecht	L 0–4	2,703	0–1–0
October 12	7:07 pm	at Augustana*		Midco Arena • Sioux Falls, South Dakota	Midco Sports+	Duris	W 3–2	2,719	1–1–0
October 18	7:00 pm	at Bentley*		Bentley Arena • Waltham, Massachusetts	FloHockey	Duris	T 1–1 ^{OT}	1,232	1–1–1
October 19	7:00 pm	at Bentley*		Bentley Arena • Waltham, Massachusetts	FloHockey	Duris	L 1–3	867	1–2–1
October 25	7:00 pm	at #17 Notre Dame*		Compton Family Ice Arena • Notre Dame, Indiana	Peacock	Duris	L 1–4	4,194	1–3–1
October 26	6:00 pm	at #17 Notre Dame*		Compton Family Ice Arena • Notre Dame, Indiana	Peacock	Rupprecht	W 5–2	4,125	2–3–1
November 9	7:00 pm	at New Hampshire*		Whittemore Center • Durham, New Hampshire	ESPN+	Rupprecht	L 1–6	4,162	2–4–1
November 15	7:00 pm	at Stonehill*		Bridgewater Ice Arena • Bridgewater, Massachusetts	NEC Front Row	Rupprecht	W 5–1	120	3–4–1
November 16	7:00 pm	at Stonehill*		Bridgewater Ice Arena • Bridgewater, Massachusetts	NEC Front Row	Rupprecht	W 4–2	248	4–4–1
November 23	7:00 pm	at #10 Providence*		Schneider Arena • Providence, Rhode Island	ESPN+	Rupprecht	L 3–4 ^{OT}	2,032	4–5–1
November 29	7:30 pm	Yale*		Northwell Health Ice Center • East Meadow, New York	ESPN+	Outen	W 3–2	287	5–5–1
November 30	7:30 pm	Yale*		Northwell Health Ice Center • East Meadow, New York	ESPN+	Outen	W 3–0	408	6–5–1
December 6	7:00 pm	at Vermont*		Gutterson Fieldhouse • Burlington, Vermont	ESPN+	Outen	W 3–2	2,023	7–5–1
December 7	6:00 pm	at Vermont*		Gutterson Fieldhouse • Burlington, Vermont	ESPN+	Outen	L 4–7	1,986	7–6–1
December 13	7:30 pm	Stonehill*		Northwell Health Ice Center • East Meadow, New York	ESPN+	Outen	W 3–1	400	8–6–1
December 14	7:30 pm	Stonehill*		Northwell Health Ice Center • East Meadow, New York	ESPN+	Outen	W 6–1	400	9–6–1
December 29	2:00 pm	at Brown*		Meehan Auditorium • Providence, Rhode Island	ESPN+	Outen	L 0–3	982	9–7–1
December 31	2:00 pm	Holy Cross*		Northwell Health Ice Center • East Meadow, New York	ESPN+	Rupprecht	W 3–1	381	10–7–1
January 3	2:00 pm	Assumption*		Northwell Health Ice Center • East Meadow, New York	ESPN+	Rupprecht	W 10–1	247	11–7–1
January 4	8:00 pm	Saint Anselm*		Northwell Health Ice Center • East Meadow, New York	ESPN+	Rupprecht	W 14–1	264	12–7–1
January 10	7:00 pm	at Colgate*		Class of 1965 Arena • Hamilton, New York	ESPN+	Rupprecht	L 1–2	903	12–8–1
January 11	4:00 pm	at Colgate*		Class of 1965 Arena • Hamilton, New York	ESPN+	Outen	L 1–3	612	12–9–1
January 17	8:00 pm	at Wisconsin*		Kohl Center • Madison, Wisconsin		Rupprecht	L 3–6	8,354	12–10–1
January 18	7:00 pm	at Wisconsin*		Kohl Center • Madison, Wisconsin		Outen	T 2–2 ^{OT}	9,699	12–10–2
January 31	2:00 pm	Stonehill*		Northwell Health Ice Center • East Meadow, New York	ESPN+	Outen	W 4–2	294	13–10–2
February 1	2:00 pm	Stonehill*		Northwell Health Ice Center • East Meadow, New York	ESPN+	Outen	L 0–2	374	13–11–2
February 6	7:45 pm	Lindenwood*		Northwell Health Ice Center • East Meadow, New York	ESPN+	Rupprecht	W 4–2	267	14–11–2
February 7	7:30 pm	Lindenwood*		Northwell Health Ice Center • East Meadow, New York	ESPN+	Rupprecht	W 3–2	236	15–11–2
February 14	2:00 pm	Alaska Anchorage*		Northwell Health Ice Center • East Meadow, New York	ESPN+	Rupprecht	W 6–1	203	16–11–2
February 15	2:00 pm	Alaska Anchorage*		Northwell Health Ice Center • East Meadow, New York	ESPN+	Rupprecht	W 4–2	300	17–11–2
February 21	7:00 pm	at Stonehill*		Bridgewater Ice Arena • Bridgewater, Massachusetts	NEC Front Row	Rupprecht	W 3–1	204	18–11–2
February 22	5:00 pm	at Stonehill*		Bridgewater Ice Arena • Bridgewater, Massachusetts	NEC Front Row	Outen	L 1–2 ^{OT}	283	18–12–2
February 28	7:30 pm	Alaska*		Northwell Health Ice Center • East Meadow, New York	ESPN+	Rupprecht	W 4–2	357	19–12–2
March 1	7:30 pm	Alaska*		Northwell Health Ice Center • East Meadow, New York	ESPN+	Outen	W 2–0	125	20–12–2
*Non-conference game. ^{#}Rankings from USCHO.com Poll. All times are in Eastern Time. Source:

== Scoring statistics ==
Name	Position	Games	Goals	Assists	Points	PIM
Carter Rapalje	F	34	17	13	30	2
Austin Brimmer	RW	32	9	12	21	15
Josh Zary	F	29	12	7	19	14
Chris Pappas	C	21	4	14	18	8
J. R. Perdion	F	31	4	14	18	10
Onni Leppänen	C/W	31	7	10	17	2
Isaac Lambert	C	31	7	10	17	15
Isaiah Fox	F	31	9	7	16	54
Anthony Lucarelli	C	29	7	8	15	8
Cade Mason	D	29	1	14	15	6
Trent Powell	D	34	2	11	13	8
Connor Gregga	F	33	4	8	12	38
Valtteri Piironen	D	34	1	11	12	8
Riley Wallack	F	14	6	5	11	8
Andrius Kulbis-Marino	D	34	3	7	10	9
Daniel Baldassarra	C	17	3	5	8	2
Nick Bernardo	D	27	2	6	8	10
Luca Leighton	F	23	1	7	8	22
Sixten Jennersjö	LW	16	4	3	7	4
Nicholas Trela	F	22	1	5	6	23
Chad Muller	RW	12	4	1	5	14
Brennan Nelson	F	16	1	3	4	26
A. J. Casperson	D	3	0	3	3	0
Heath Armstrong	F	14	0	3	3	2
John Gormley	D	34	2	0	2	26
Ty Outen	G	15	0	2	2	4
Noah Rupprecht	G	18	0	1	1	4
Garrett Valk	G	20	0	1	1	2
Aaron Grounds	F	1	0	0	0	0
Xan Gurney	D	2	0	0	0	15
Michael Polston	G	2	0	0	0	0
Daniel Duris	G	4	0	0	0	0
Total			111	191	302	357

== Goaltending statistics ==
Name	Games	Minutes	Wins	Losses	Ties	Goals against	Saves	Shut outs	SV %	GAA
Ty Outen	15	809:34	7	5	1	26	297	2	.920	1.93
Daniel Duris	4	216:11	1	2	1	8	83	0	.912	2.22
Noah Rupprecht	20	979:56	12	5	0	38	347	0	.901	2.33
Michael Polston	5	31:04	0	0	0	2	11	0	.846	3.86
Empty Net	-	19:12	-	-	-	3	-	-	-	-
Total	34	2055:57	20	12	2	77	738	2	.906	2.25

== Rankings ==
Poll	Week																											
Poll	Pre	1	2	3	4	5	6	7	8	9	10	11	12	13	14	15	16	17	18	19	20	21	22	23	24	25	26	27 (Final)
USCHO.com	NR	NR	NR	NR	NR	NR	NR	NR	NR	NR	NR	NR	–	NR	NR	NR	NR	NR	NR	NR	NR	NR	NR	NR	NR	NR	–	NR
USA Hockey	NR	NR	NR	NR	NR	NR	NR	NR	NR	NR	NR	NR	–	NR	NR	NR	NR	NR	NR	NR	NR	NR	NR	NR	NR	NR	NR	NR

Note: USCHO did not release a poll in week 12 or 26.
Note: USA Hockey did not release a poll in week 12.
