= 2021–22 LIU Sharks men's ice hockey season =

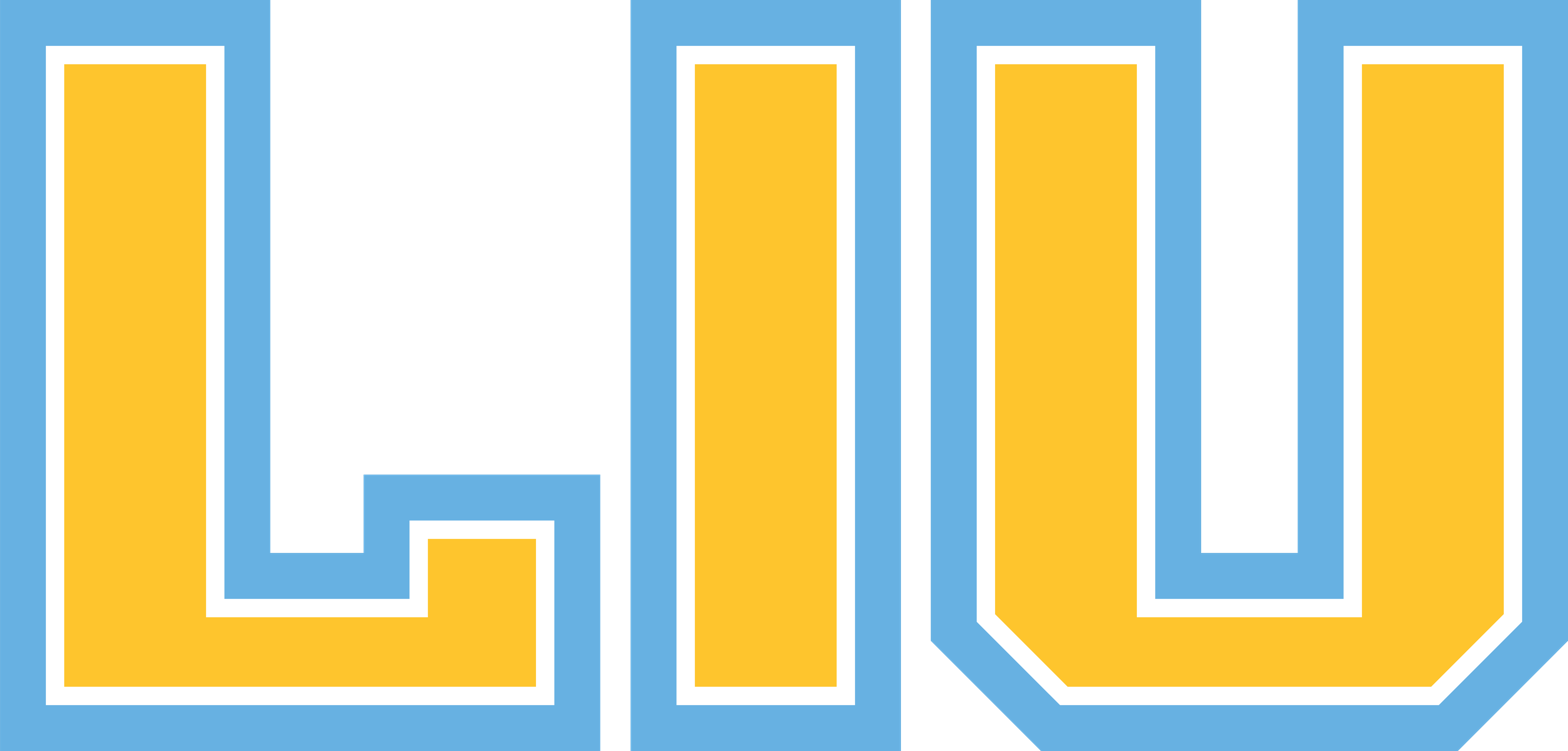
- Conference: Independent
- Home ice: Northwell Health Ice Center

Rankings
- USCHO: NR
- USA Today: NR

Record
- Overall: 10–21–3
- Home: 5–3–1
- Road: 5–18–2

Coaches and captains
- Head coach: Brett Riley
- Assistant coaches: Will Messa; Joe Gilhooly

The 2021–22 LIU Sharks men's ice hockey season was the 2nd season of play for the program. The Sharks represented Long Island University and were coached by Brett Riley, in his 2nd season.

== Season ==
After the COVID-19 pandemic curtailed the program's first season, LIU was able to pay its first full campaign in 2022. Partly due to the recent addition of the team to the Division I ranks, Long Island scheduled several games against Division II teams during the season. While none of these games helped the Sharks in improving their standing (only games against D-I teams are included in PairWise rankings), they won each match comfortably. Against their contemporaries, the Sharks were less successful but the team did show some flashes of potential throughout the year.

During the first half of the season, LIU played 14 games against D-I opponents and the team won once against lowly Miami. While this was hardly surprising as the team was just two years old, the Sharks compounded their difficulty by scheduling many ranked opponents, several of whom would make the NCAA tournament. The schedule didn't get much easier in the second half but LIU was able to earn a season split with fellow independent Alaska to give some heft to their win total.

== Departures ==
Player	Position	Nationality	Cause
Mathew Harris	Defenseman	United States	Graduation (retired)
Brett Humberstone	Defenseman	Canada	Transferred to Wisconsin–Stevens Point
Mitch Meek	Defenseman	Canada	Graduation (retired)
Garrett Metcalf	Goaltender	United States	Graduation (signed with Knoxville Ice Bears)
Stephen Mundinger	Goaltender	United States	Graduation (signed with Maine Mariners)
Christian Rajic	Forward	Canada	Graduation (retired)
Arseni Smekhnov	Forward	Russia	Returned to juniors (Janesville Jets)
Tanner Schachle	Forward	United States	Left mid-season (signed with Rapid City Rush)
Madoka Suzuki	Forward	Japan	Transferred to Carleton
Connor Szmul	Forward	United States	Transferred to Wisconsin–Eau Claire
Garrett Worth	Forward	United States	Left program (retired)

== Recruiting ==
Player	Position	Nationality	Age	Notes
Kristofer Carlson	Goaltender	United States	24	Centreville, VA; graduate transfer from Alaska Anchorage
Spencer Cox	Defenseman	United States	20	West Chester, PA
Isaiah Fox	Forward	Canada	21	Pierrefonds, QC
John Gormley	Defenseman	United States	21	Bronx, NY
Billy Jerry	Forward	United States	23	River Falls, WI; graduate transfer from Rensselaer
P. J. Marrocco	Forward	Canada	24	Edmonton, AB; transfer from Arizona State
Ethan Martini	Defenseman	Canada	20	Trail, BC
Carson Musser	Defenseman	United States	24	Grand Rapids, MI; graduate transfer from Bowling Green
Zack Nazzarett	Forward	United States	21	Cheektowaga, NY; transfer from Alaska Anchorage
Dylan Schuett	Forward	Canada	20	Medicine Hat, AB
Jake Stevens	Defenseman	United States	24	Naperville, IL; graduate transfer from St. Lawrence
Justin Thompson	Forward	United States	21	Maplewood, MN
Jordan Timmons	Forward	United States	22	Bridgeville, PA; transfer from Robert Morris
Tyler Welsh	Forward	Canada	24	Whistler, BC; graduate transfer from Yale

== Roster ==
As of September 21, 2021.

No.	Nat.	Player	Class	Pos	Height	Weight	DoB	Hometown	Previous team	NHL rights
1	(United States)	Kris Carlson	Graduate	G	6' 2" (1.88 m)	196 lb (89 kg)	1997-08-19	Centreville, Virginia	Alaska Anchorage (WCHA)	—
2	(United States)	Nolan McElhaney	Junior	D	6' 3" (1.91 m)	190 lb (86 kg)	1999-04-22	Natick, Massachusetts	New Hampshire (HEA)	—
3	(United States)	Carson Musser	Graduate	D	6' 1" (1.85 m)	191 lb (87 kg)	1997-04-21	Grand Rapids, Michigan	Bowling Green (WCHA)	—
4	(United States)	Spencer Cox	Freshman	D	6' 0" (1.83 m)	185 lb (84 kg)	2001-02-07	Powell, Ohio	Chippewa Steel (NAHL)	—
5	(United States)	Jordan Timmons	Senior	F	6' 0" (1.83 m)	220 lb (100 kg)	1998-10-25	Bridgeville, Pennsylvania	Robert Morris (AHA)	—
6	(Canada)	Tanner Hopps	Sophomore	F	6' 0" (1.83 m)	190 lb (86 kg)	2000-01-02	Delta, British Columbia	Drayton Valley Thunder (AJHL)	—
7	(Canada)	Jordan Di Cicco	Sophomore	D	5' 9" (1.75 m)	183 lb (83 kg)	1999-03-17	London, Ontario	Brooks Bandits (AJHL)	—
8	(Canada)	Isaiah Fox	Freshman	F	5' 11" (1.8 m)	163 lb (74 kg)	2000-07-05	Pierrefonds, Quebec	Maine Nordiques (NAHL)	—
9	(United States)	Zack Bross	Graduate	F	6' 0" (1.83 m)	195 lb (88 kg)	1996-03-11	St. Louis, Missouri	Massachusetts–Boston (NEHC)	—
10	(United States)	Tanner Schachle	Senior	F	6' 4" (1.93 m)	215 lb (98 kg)	1997-06-20	Wasilla, Alaska	Alaska Anchorage (WCHA)	—
11	(Canada)	Max Balinson	Senior	D	6' 0" (1.83 m)	192 lb (87 kg)	1996-10-05	Ancaster, Ontario	Arizona State (NCAA)	—
12	(United States)	Zack Nazzarett	Sophomore	F	5' 8" (1.73 m)	165 lb (75 kg)	2000-08-25	Cheektowaga, New York	New Jersey Titans (NAHL)	—
13	(Canada)	Jacob Franczak	Sophomore	F	6' 1" (1.85 m)	180 lb (82 kg)	2000-06-13	Edmonton, Alberta	Sherwood Park Crusaders (AJHL)	—
14	(United States)	Aaron White	Sophomore	F	5' 10" (1.78 m)	174 lb (79 kg)	1999-06-03	Toledo, Ohio	Amarillo Bulls (NAHL)	—
15	(United States)	Carter Ekberg	Senior	D	6' 2" (1.88 m)	190 lb (86 kg)	1997-05-14	Pittsburgh, Pennsylvania	Air Force (AHA)	—
16	(Canada)	Marty Westhaver	Sophomore	F	5' 11" (1.8 m)	185 lb (84 kg)	1999-03-15	Victoria, British Columbia	Victoria Grizzlies (BCHL)	—
17	(Canada)	Nolan Welsh	Sophomore	F	5' 10" (1.78 m)	161 lb (73 kg)	1999-06-23	Burnaby, British Columbia	Prince George Spruce Kings (BCHL)	—
18	(United States)	Derek Osik	Senior	F	6' 0" (1.83 m)	180 lb (82 kg)	1998-03-30	Shrewsbury, Massachusetts	Massachusetts–Lowell (HEA)	—
19	(United States)	Jack Quinn	Sophomore	F	6' 0" (1.83 m)	181 lb (82 kg)	1999-12-28	Lancaster, Massachusetts	Kenai River Brown Bears (NAHL)	—
20	(Sweden)	Gustav Müller	Sophomore	F	6' 0" (1.83 m)	192 lb (87 kg)	1999-04-23	Hudiksvall, Sweden	Madison Capitols (USHL)	—
21	(Canada)	Tyler Welsh	Graduate	F	5' 11" (1.8 m)	175 lb (79 kg)	1997-03-07	Whistler, British Columbia	Yale (ECAC)	—
22	(Canada)	Rob McCollum	Sophomore	D	6' 2" (1.88 m)	181 lb (82 kg)	1999-11-04	Thunder Bay, Ontario	Muskegon Lumberjacks (USHL)	—
23	(Canada)	Ethan Martini	Freshman	D	6' 7" (2.01 m)	195 lb (88 kg)	2000-10-04	Trail, British Columbia	Penticton Vees (BCHL)	—
25	(Canada)	Preston Brodziak	Sophomore	F	6' 0" (1.83 m)	185 lb (84 kg)	1999-06-29	Estevan, Saskatchewan	Prince George Spruce Kings (BCHL)	—
26	(Canada)	Daine Dubois	Sophomore	F	5' 11" (1.8 m)	190 lb (86 kg)	1999-09-11	Williams Lake, British Columbia	Bonnyville Pontiacs (AJHL)	—
27	(United States)	Billy Jerry	Graduate	F	6' 4" (1.93 m)	190 lb (86 kg)	1997-11-21	River Falls, Wisconsin	Rensselaer (ECAC)	—
28	(Canada)	P. J. Marrocco	Senior	F	5' 8" (1.73 m)	170 lb (77 kg)	1997-08-27	Edmonton, Alberta	Arizona State (NCAA)	—
29	(United States)	Vincent Purpura	Senior	G	6' 6" (1.98 m)	194 lb (88 kg)	1998-10-29	Lemont, Illinois	Boston University (HEA)	—
35	(United States)	Brandon Perrone	Junior	G	5' 9" (1.75 m)	175 lb (79 kg)	1998-10-26	Hauppauge, New York	Alaska Anchorage (WCHA)	—
42	(United States)	Justin Thompson	Freshman	F	5' 11" (1.8 m)	180 lb (82 kg)	2000-06-14	Maplewood, Minnesota	Janesville Jets (NAHL)	—
44	(United States)	Jake Stevens	Graduate	F	6' 2" (1.88 m)	205 lb (93 kg)	1996-12-06	Naperville, Illinois	St. Lawrence (ECAC)	—
55	(Canada)	Dylan Schuett	Freshman	F	6' 1" (1.85 m)	218 lb (99 kg)	2000-09-24	Medicine Hat, Alberta	Northeast Generals (NAHL)	—

== Standings ==
2021–22 NCAA Division I Independent ice hockey standings
	Overall record					
	GP	W	L	T	GF	GA
Alaska	34	14	18	2	87	95
Arizona State	35	17	17	1	116	121
Long Island	34	10	21	3	87	120
Rankings: USCHO.com Top 20 Poll

== Schedule and results ==
Date	Time	Opponent^{#}	Rank^{#}	Site	TV	Decision	Result	Attendance	Record
Regular Season
October 3	3:00 PM	at Penn State*		Pegula Ice Arena • University Park, Pennsylvania		Carlson	L 1–3	5,795	0–1–0
October 4	7:00 PM	at Penn State*		Pegula Ice Arena • University Park, Pennsylvania		Carlson	L 2–5	5,592	0–2–0
October 9	6:00 PM	at #19 Notre Dame*		Compton Family Ice Arena • Notre Dame, Indiana	NBCSRN, SNY	Purpura	L 2–5	3,156	0–3–0
October 22	7:45 PM	Assumption*		Northwell Health Ice Center • East Meadow, New York		Carlson	W 7–0	689	1–3–0
October 23	2:00 PM	Post*		Northwell Health Ice Center • East Meadow, New York		Perrone	W 6–1	106	2–3–0
October 29	8:07 PM	at #10 Omaha*		Baxter Arena • Omaha, Nebraska		Carlson	L 0–6	4,369	2–4–0
October 30	8:07 PM	at #10 Omaha*		Baxter Arena • Omaha, Nebraska		Purpura	L 1–7	3,654	2–5–0
November 3	7:15 PM	at #19 Massachusetts Lowell*		Tsongas Center • Lowell, Massachusetts		Carlson	T 3–3	2,633	2–5–1
November 12	3:00 PM	Princeton*		Northwell Health Ice Center • East Meadow, New York		Carlson	L 1–2	134	2–6–1
November 13	4:00 PM	at Princeton*		Hobey Baker Memorial Rink • Princeton, New Jersey		Carlson	T 4–4 ^{OT}	1,288	2–6–2
November 19	7:00 PM	at Rensselaer*		Houston Field House • Troy, New York		Carlson	L 2–7	404	2–7–2
November 20	8:00 PM	Rensselaer*		Northwell Health Ice Center • East Meadow, New York		Carlson	T 2–2 ^{OT}	137	2–7–3
November 23	7:00 PM	at Saint Anselm*		Thomas F. Sullivan Arena • Goffstown, New Hampshire		Purpura	W 4–0	251	3–7–3
November 26	7:05 PM	at Miami*		Steve Cady Arena • Oxford, Ohio		Carlson	W 7–4	1,009	4–7–3
November 27	5:05 PM	at Miami*		Steve Cady Arena • Oxford, Ohio		Carlson	L 1–4	906	4–8–3
December 10	7:00 PM	#2 Quinnipiac*		Northwell Health Ice Center • East Meadow, New York		Purpura	L 1–4	672	4–9–3
December 11	7:00 PM	at #2 Quinnipiac*		People's United Center • Hamden, Connecticut		Perrone	L 0–5	2,890	4–10–3
December 31	7:05 PM	at #17 Ohio State*		Value City Arena • Columbus, Ohio		Purpura	L 0–6	2,958	4–11–3
January 1	7:05 PM	at #17 Ohio State*		Value City Arena • Columbus, Ohio		Carlson	L 2–7	2,621	4–12–3
January 7	7:00 PM	at #11 Northeastern*		Matthews Arena • Boston, Massachusetts	NESN	Purpura	L 0–1	0	4–13–3
January 8	7:00 PM	at #11 Northeastern*		Matthews Arena • Boston, Massachusetts		Purpura	L 0–6	0	4–14–3
January 21	7:45 PM	Saint Anselm*		Northwell Health Ice Center • East Meadow, New York		Purpura	W 8–1	345	5–14–3
January 22	2:00 PM	Saint Anselm*		Northwell Health Ice Center • East Meadow, New York		Carlson	W 7–0	279	6–14–3
January 30	4:00 PM	at Brown*		Meehan Auditorium • Providence, Rhode Island		Purpura	W 4–3	170	7–14–3
February 1	7:00 PM	at Union*		Times Union Center • Albany, New York		Purpura	W 4–1	1,252	8–14–3
February 4	7:00 PM	at #10 Massachusetts*		Mullins Center • Amherst, Massachusetts		Purpura	L 3–6	3,274	8–15–3
February 5	7:00 PM	at #10 Massachusetts*		Mullins Center • Amherst, Massachusetts		Carlson	L 1–3	3,410	8–16–3
February 18	3:00 PM	Alaska*		Northwell Health Ice Center • East Meadow, New York		Carlson	W 4–1	114	9–16–3
February 19	2:00 PM	Alaska*		Northwell Health Ice Center • East Meadow, New York		Purpura	L 3–4	32	9–17–3
February 25	7:05 PM	at #16 Massachusetts Lowell*		Tsongas Center • Lowell, Massachusetts		Carlson	L 1–5	3,512	9–18–3
March 4	11:07 PM	at Alaska*		Carlson Center • Fairbanks, Alaska		Purpura	W 3–2	2,134	10–18–3
March 5	11:07 PM	at Alaska*		Carlson Center • Fairbanks, Alaska		Carlson	L 1–3	2,297	10–19–3
March 11	9:05 PM	at Arizona State*		Oceanside Ice Arena • Tempe, Arizona		Purpura	L 1–2	920	10–20–3
March 12	6:05 PM	at Arizona State*		Oceanside Ice Arena • Tempe, Arizona		Carlson	L 2–5	920	10–21–3
*Non-conference game. ^{#}Rankings from USCHO.com Poll. All times are in Eastern Time. Source:

== Scoring statistics ==
Name	Position	Games	Goals	Assists	Points	PIM
Billy Jerry	C	34	14	17	31	10
Tyler Welsh	F	27	7	18	25	26
Spencer Cox	D	34	7	13	20	47
Jake Stevens	D	34	4	13	17	19
Jordan Timmons	F	29	8	8	16	33
Nolan Welsh	F	33	5	8	13	12
P. J. Marrocco	F	32	7	4	11	19
Carson Musser	D	31	4	7	11	36
Jack Quinn	F	28	4	5	9	21
Zack Bross	F	31	4	5	9	14
Jordan Di Cicco	D	29	1	8	9	12
Max Balinson	D	17	4	4	8	19
Isaiah Fox	F	28	4	4	8	58
Marty Westhaver	F	24	2	6	8	6
Preston Brodziak	F	23	3	3	6	19
Zack Nazzarett	LW	22	2	3	5	12
Gustav Müller	F	26	2	3	5	8
Derek Osik	LW	14	1	4	5	4
Carter Ekberg	D	27	0	5	5	14
Daine Dubois	F	14	2	1	3	2
John Gormley	D	21	0	3	3	6
Nolan McElhaney	D	4	1	1	2	2
Dylan Schuett	C	21	1	1	2	25
Jacob Franczak	C	6	0	2	2	4
Ethan Martini	D	23	0	2	2	48
Tanner Hopps	F	5	0	1	1	0
Rob McCollum	D	9	0	1	1	16
Tanner Schachle	LW	5	0	0	0	19
Brandon Perrone	G	5	0	0	0	0
Justin Thompson	F	10	0	0	0	21
Vinnie Purpura	G	17	0	0	0	0
Kris Carlson	G	18	0	0	0	12
Bench	-	-	-	-	-	10
Total			87	150	237	554

== Goaltending statistics ==
Name	Games	Minutes	Wins	Losses	Ties	Goals against	Saves	Shut outs	SV %	GAA
Brandon Perrone	5	129	1	1	0	7	43	0	.860	3.25
Vincent Purpura	17	866	5	9	0	47	389	1	.892	3.26
Kris Carlson	18	1049	4	11	3	62	485	2	.887	3.55
Empty Net	-	10	-	-	-	4	-	-	-	-
Total	35	2054	10	21	3	120	917	3	.884	3.51

== Rankings ==
Poll	Week																									
Poll	Pre	1	2	3	4	5	6	7	8	9	10	11	12	13	14	15	16	17	18	19	20	21	22	23	24	25 (Final)
USCHO.com	NR	NR	NR	NR	NR	NR	NR	NR	NR	NR	NR	NR	NR	NR	NR	NR	NR	NR	NR	NR	NR	NR	NR	NR	-	NR
USA Today	NR	NR	NR	NR	NR	NR	NR	NR	NR	NR	NR	NR	NR	NR	NR	NR	NR	NR	NR	NR	NR	NR	NR	NR	NR	NR

Note: USCHO did not release a poll in week 24.
