= 2020–21 LIU Sharks men's ice hockey season =

Season in Ice Hockey

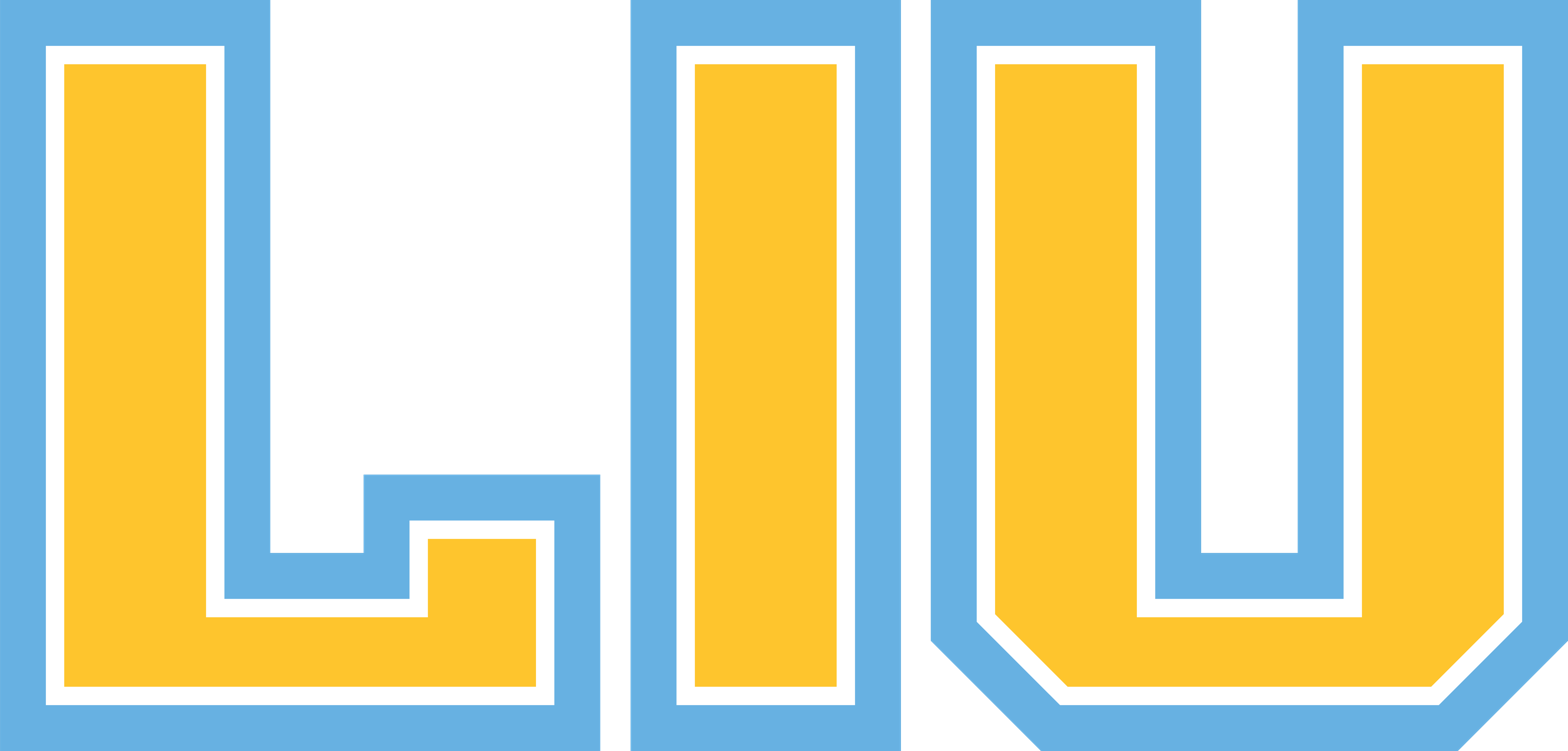
- Conference: Independent
- Home ice: Islanders Iceworks

Rankings
- USCHO: NR
- USA Today: NR

Record
- Overall: 3–10–0
- Road: 3–10–0

Coaches and captains
- Head coach: Brett Riley
- Assistant coaches: Will Messa; Joe Gilhooly; Bobby Goepfert

The 2020–21 LIU Sharks men's ice hockey season was the inaugural season of play for the program at the Division I level. The Sharks represented Long Island University and were coached by Brett Riley, in his 1st season.

== Season ==
Prior to the season, LIU entered into a scheduling partnership with Atlantic Hockey. Due to the COVID-19 pandemic, LIU would schedule games against members of Atlantic Hockey but would not be eligible for the conference tournament. In August, the NCAA granted a blanket waiver for all winter sports, not counting the 2020–21 season against eligibility. This gave all LIU players an additional year of college hockey.

== Recruiting ==
Due to LIU not possessing a club team the previous season, the entire varsity roster was assembled from scratch. Eleven transfers from other college programs were used as the framework for the inaugural team roster while 15 freshman were part of LIU's first recruiting class. At first, it was expected that the six non-graduate transfer players would not play for LIU in its first season. However, in December the NCAA changed its transfer rules, dropping the requirement that students had to sit out a year when changing schools.

== Roster ==
As of October 8, 2020.

No.	Nat.	Player	Class	Pos	Height	Weight	DoB	Hometown	Previous team	NHL rights
1	(United States)	Garrett Metcalf	Graduate	G	6' 4" (1.93 m)	195 lb (88 kg)	1996-03-05	Salt Lake City, Utah	Mercyhurst (AHA)	ANA, 179th overall 2015
2	(United States)	Nolan McElhaney	Sophomore	D	6' 3" (1.91 m)	190 lb (86 kg)	1999-04-22	Natick, Massachusetts	New Hampshire (HEA)	—
3	(United States)	Mat Harris	Graduate	D	6' 1" (1.85 m)	195 lb (88 kg)	1996-07-14	Sudbury, Massachusetts	Rensselaer (ECAC)	—
5	(United States)	Garrett Worth	Freshman	F	5' 10" (1.78 m)	175 lb (79 kg)	1999-08-03	Duluth, Minnesota	Minnesota Wilderness (NAHL)	—
6	(Canada)	Tanner Hopps	Freshman	F	6' 0" (1.83 m)	190 lb (86 kg)	2000-01-02	Delta, British Columbia	Drayton Valley Thunder (AJHL)	—
7	(Canada)	Jordan DiCicco	Freshman	D	5' 9" (1.75 m)	183 lb (83 kg)	1999-03-17	London, Ontario	Brooks Bandits (AJHL)	—
8	(United States)	Zack Bross	Senior	F	6' 0" (1.83 m)	195 lb (88 kg)	1996-03-11	St. Louis, Missouri	Massachusetts–Boston (NEHC)	—
9	(Canada)	Christian Rajic	Senior	F	5' 10" (1.78 m)	165 lb (75 kg)	1997-02-06	Oakville, Ontario	Alabama Huntsville (WCHA)	—
10	(Canada)	Mitchell Meek	Graduate	D	6' 0" (1.83 m)	190 lb (86 kg)	1996-08-21	Victoria, British Columbia	Michigan Tech (WCHA)	—
11	(Canada)	Max Balinson	Junior	D	6' 0" (1.83 m)	192 lb (87 kg)	1996-10-05	Ancaster, Ontario	Arizona State (NCAA)	—
12	(Canada)	Brett Humberstone	Freshman	D	6' 0" (1.83 m)	190 lb (86 kg)	2000-03-17	Napanee, Ontario	Wellington Dukes (OJHL)	—
13	(Canada)	Jacob Franczak	Freshman	F	6' 1" (1.85 m)	180 lb (82 kg)	2000-06-13	Edmonton, Alberta	Sherwood Park Crusaders (AJHL)	—
14	(United States)	Aaron White	Freshman	F	5' 10" (1.78 m)	174 lb (79 kg)	1999-06-03	Toledo, Ohio	Amarillo Bulls (NAHL)	—
15	(United States)	Carter Ekberg	Junior	D	6' 2" (1.88 m)	190 lb (86 kg)	1997-05-14	Pittsburgh, Pennsylvania	Air Force (AHA)	—
16	(Canada)	Marty Westhaver	Freshman	F	5' 11" (1.8 m)	185 lb (84 kg)	1999-03-15	Victoria, British Columbia	Victoria Grizzlies (BCHL)	—
17	(Canada)	Nolan Welsh	Freshman	F	5' 10" (1.78 m)	161 lb (73 kg)	1999-06-23	Burnaby, British Columbia	Prince George Spruce Kings (BCHL)	—
18	(United States)	Derek Osik	Graduate	F	6' 0" (1.83 m)	180 lb (82 kg)	1998-03-30	Shrewsbury, Massachusetts	Massachusetts–Lowell (HEA)	—
19	(United States)	Jack Quinn	Freshman	F	6' 0" (1.83 m)	181 lb (82 kg)	1999-12-28	Lancaster, Massachusetts	Kenai River Brown Bears (NAHL)	—
20	(Sweden)	Gustav Müller	Freshman	F	6' 0" (1.83 m)	192 lb (87 kg)	1999-04-23	Hudiksvall, Sweden	Madison Capitols (USHL)	—
21	(United States)	Connor Szmul	Freshman	F	5' 8" (1.73 m)	155 lb (70 kg)	1999-09-08	Castle Rock, Colorado	Chippewa Steel (NAHL)	—
22	(Canada)	Rob McCollum	Freshman	D	6' 2" (1.88 m)	181 lb (82 kg)	1999-11-04	Thunder Bay, Ontario	Muskegon Lumberjacks (USHL)	—
23	(Russia)	Arseni Smekhnov	Freshman	F	6' 1" (1.85 m)	194 lb (88 kg)	2001-01-28	Kirov, Russia	Janesville Jets (NAHL)	—
24	(United States)	Tanner Schachle	Junior	F	6' 4" (1.93 m)	215 lb (98 kg)	1997-06-20	Wasilla, Alaska	Alaska Anchorage (WCHA)	—
25	(Canada)	Preston Brodziak	Freshman	F	6' 0" (1.83 m)	185 lb (84 kg)	1999-06-29	Estevan, Saskatchewan	Prince George Spruce Kings (BCHL)	—
26	(Canada)	Daine Dubois	Freshman	F	5' 11" (1.8 m)	190 lb (86 kg)	1999-09-11	Williams Lake, British Columbia	Bonnyville Pontiacs (AJHL)	—
27	(Japan)	Madoka Suzuki	Freshman	F	5' 11" (1.8 m)	154 lb (70 kg)	2000-01-14	Kanagawa, Japan	Kemptville 73's (CCHL)	—
29	(United States)	Vincent Purpura	Junior	G	6' 6" (1.98 m)	194 lb (88 kg)	1998-10-29	Lemont, Illinois	Boston University (HEA)	—
33	(United States)	Stephen Mundinger	Graduate	G	6' 8" (2.03 m)	260 lb (118 kg)	1995-04-26	Smithtown, New York	Maine (HEA)	—
	(United States)	Brandon Perrone	Sophomore	G	5' 9" (1.75 m)	175 lb (79 kg)	1998-10-26	Hauppauge, New York	Alaska Anchorage (WCHA)	—

== Standings ==
2020–21 NCAA Division I Independent ice hockey standings
	Overall record					
	GP	W	L	T	GF	GA
Arizona State	26	7	16	3	68	106
Long Island	13	3	10	0	23	55
Rankings: USCHO.com Top 20 Poll

== Schedule and results ==
Date	Time	Opponent^{#}	Rank^{#}	Site	TV	Decision	Result	Attendance	Record
Regular Season
November 19	10:37 AM	at Holy Cross*		Hart Center • Worcester, Massachusetts		Metcalf	W 3–2 ^{OT}	0	1–0–0
November 22	4:00 PM	at Holy Cross*		Hart Center • Worcester, Massachusetts		Metcalf	L 2–5	0	1–1–0
December 11	5:00 PM	at RIT*		MassMutual Center • Springfield, Massachusetts		Metcalf	W 4–3	0	2–1–0
December 12	5:00 PM	at RIT*		MassMutual Center • Springfield, Massachusetts		Mundinger	L 1–5	0	2–2–0
January 2	2:05 PM	at #20 American International*		MassMutual Center • Springfield, Massachusetts		Metcalf	L 1–2	0	2–3–0
January 13	2:05 PM	at #20 American International*		MassMutual Center • Springfield, Massachusetts		Metcalf	L 2–5	0	2–4–0
January 15	5:00 PM	at Army*		Tate Rink • West Point, New York		Metcalf	L 2–5	0	2–5–0
January 16	7:00 PM	at Army*		Tate Rink • West Point, New York		Purpura	W 3–2 ^{OT}	0	3–5–0
January 22	7:00 PM	at Liberty*		Lahaye Ice Center • Lynchburg, Virginia (Exhibition)			L 1–2		
January 23	3:30 PM	at Liberty*		Lahaye Ice Center • Lynchburg, Virginia (Exhibition)			W 4–0		
February 4	7:00 PM	at #19 Robert Morris*		Colonials Arena • Neville Township, Pennsylvania		Purpura	L 1–4	0	3–6–0
February 5	3:00 PM	at #19 Robert Morris*		Colonials Arena • Neville Township, Pennsylvania		Purpura	L 0–4	0	3–7–0
February 22	6:00 PM	at #12 Quinnipiac*		People's United Center • Hamden, Connecticut		Metcalf	L 1–7	0	3–8–0
February 26	5:00 PM	at Army*		Tate Rink • West Point, New York		Metcalf	L 0–5	24	3–9–0
February 27	7:00 PM	at Army*		Tate Rink • West Point, New York		Metcalf	L 3–6	86	3–10–0
*Non-conference game. ^{#}Rankings from USCHO.com Poll. All times are in Eastern Time.

== Scoring statistics ==
Name	Position	Games	Goals	Assists	Points	PIM
Nolan Welsh	F	12	3	4	7	4
Zack Bross	F	11	4	2	6	31
Mitch Meek	D	11	3	3	6	4
Christian Rajic	C	10	2	3	5	24
Max Balinson	D	11	1	4	5	8
Gustav Müller	F	12	3	1	4	4
Jordan Di Cicco	D	13	3	1	4	6
Jack Quinn	F	13	1	3	4	2
Jacob Franczak	C	12	2	0	2	4
Preston Brodziak	F	8	1	1	2	4
Arseni Smekhnov	C	10	0	2	2	4
Brett Humberstone	D	11	0	2	2	19
Mat Harris	D	13	0	2	2	6
Garrett Worth	F	8	0	1	1	2
Madoka Suzuki	LW	8	0	1	1	2
Tanner Schachle	LW	9	0	1	1	24
Nolan McElhaney	D	12	0	1	1	8
Derek Osik	F	13	0	1	1	0
Stephen Mundinger	G	1	0	0	0	0
Vincent Purpura	G	4	0	0	0	0
Tanner Hopps	F	6	0	0	0	2
Carter Ekberg	D	7	0	0	0	8
Garrett Metcalf	G	9	0	0	0	0
Aaron White	F	9	0	0	0	0
Connor Szmul	F	9	0	0	0	0
Rob McCollum	D	10	0	0	0	10
Bench	-	-	-	-	-	6
Total			23	33	56	182

== Goaltending statistics ==
Name	Games	Minutes	Wins	Losses	Ties	Goals against	Saves	Shut outs	SV %	GAA
Vincent Purpura	4	211	1	2	0	12	111	0	.902	3.40
Garrett Metcalf	9	537	2	7	0	36	329	0	.901	4.02
Stephen Mundinger	1	29	0	1	0	3	12	0	.800	6.08
Empty Net	-	7	-	-	-	4	-	-	-	-
Total	13	786	3	10	0	55	452	0	.892	4.20

== Rankings ==
Poll	Week																					
Poll	Pre	1	2	3	4	5	6	7	8	9	10	11	12	13	14	15	16	17	18	19	20	21 (Final)
USCHO.com	NR	NR	NR	NR	NR	NR	NR	NR	NR	NR	NR	NR	NR	NR	NR	NR	NR	NR	NR	NR	-	NR
USA Today	NR	NR	NR	NR	NR	NR	NR	NR	NR	NR	NR	NR	NR	NR	NR	NR	NR	NR	NR	NR	NR	NR

USCHO did not release a poll in week 20.
