= Brett Riley (ice hockey) =

American ice hockey coach & player (born 1991)

Current position
- Title: Head coach
- Team: Ferris State
- Conference: CCHA
- Record: 8–27–2 (.243)

Biographical details
- Born: January 25, 1991 (age 35); Needham, Massachusetts, U.S.
- Education: Hobart College

Playing career
- 2005–2010: The Governor's Academy
- 2010–2014: Hobart
- Position: Forward

Coaching career (HC unless noted)
- 2014–2017: The Albany Academy
- 2014–2016: Charlottetown Islanders (Scout)
- 2017–2019: Wilkes
- 2019–2020: Colgate (assistant)
- 2020–2025: Long Island
- 2025–present: Ferris State

Head coaching record
- Overall: 86–120–11 (.422)

Brett Riley (born January 25, 1991) is an American ice hockey coach and former player. He is currently the head coach at Ferris State and was previously head coach at Long Island and an assistant at Colgate.

== Career ==
Riley began his college hockey career as a player at Hobart. In four years with the Statesmen Riley played only sparingly, appearing in just 22 games and scoring twice, but was a three-time academic All-American. After graduating with degree in history, Riley began his coaching career at The Albany Academy, leading the program while also serving as a scout for the Charlottetown Islanders, a team in the QMJHL. In 2017 he returned to college hockey, becoming the first head coach for Wilkes University, and had a full year to prepare for its inaugural season in 2018–19.

When Wilkes hit the ice, the team performed well, finished in a tie for 3rd in the UCHC, but lost their quarterfinal game in the conference tournament. After just one season with Wilkes, Riley was hired as an assistant coach by Colgate, working under one of the most respected men in Division I hockey, Don Vaughan. Riley's tenure with the team saw the Raiders achieve moderate gains, rising from 10th in ECAC Hockey to 8th and won its first playoff round in five years. Unfortunately, due to the COVID-19 pandemic, Colgate's season ended prematurely.

Despite his brief tenure at the top level of competition, Riley was brought in to be the first head coach for yet another program. This time he signed on to lead the LIU Sharks beginning with the 2020–21 season. He helmed the team for five years, slowly building the program into a winning outfit. In 2025 he was announced as the new bench boss for Ferris State, succeeding the retiring Bob Daniels.

== Personal life ==
Riley is part of a legendary college hockey family, with his father, uncle and grandfather all having coached Army since 1950. His father Rob also won a Division III National Championship in 1984 while his grandfather Jack coached the US National team to a gold medal at the 1960 Winter Olympics.

== College head coaching record ==
Record table
Season	Coach	Overall	Conference	Standing	Postseason
Wilkes Colonels (UCHC) (2018–2019)
2018–19	Wilkes	16–8–2	11–5–2–2	T–3rd	UCHC Quarterfinals
Wilkes:		16–8–2 (.654)	11–5–2 (.667)		
Long Island Sharks (Independent) (2020–2025)
2020–21	Long Island	3–10–0			
2021–22	Long Island	10–21–3			
2022–23	Long Island	13–22–1			
2023–24	Long Island	16–20–1			
2024–25	Long Island	20–12–2			
Long Island:		62–85–7 (.425)			
Ferris State Bulldogs (CCHA) (2025–present)
2025–26	Ferris State	8–27–2	6–18–2	8th	CCHA Quarterfinals
2026–27	Ferris State				
Ferris State:		8–27–2	6–18–2		
Total:		86–120–11 (.422)			
National champion Postseason invitational champion Conference regular season champion Conference regular season and conference tournament champion Division regular season champion Division regular season and conference tournament champion Conference tournament champion
