= Northwell Health Ice Center =

Ice hockey venue in East Meadow, New York

- Interactive map of Northwell Health Ice Center
- Former names: Twin Rinks Ice Center
- Address: 200 Merrick Ave
- Location: East Meadow, New York
- Coordinates: 40°43′37.0″N 73°34′35.1″W
- Owner: New York Islanders
- Operator: New York Islanders
- Surface: (two) 200x85 feet (ice hockey)

Construction
- Opened: 2014

Tenants
- New York Islanders; LIU Sharks men's ice hockey LIU Sharks women's ice hockey P.A.L. Jr. Islanders

Northwell Health Ice Center is a multipurpose ice hockey facility at Eisenhower Park in East Meadow, New York, United States. It contains two regulation-sized NHL rinks and one outdoor recreational rink. It is owned and operated by the New York Islanders – an NHL team – and is used primarily by the local community for a variety of reasons, including 'learning to skate', house leagues, and summer camps.

== History ==
The venue opened as Twin Rinks Ice Center in 2014, which was a partnership between Nassau County and investors Joel Friedman, Chris Ferraro and Peter Ferraro. The owners subsequently filed for bankruptcy in June 2015 and the ice center was taken over by former Islanders owner Charles Wang, who turned it into the team's practice facility beginning in 2016.

After founding a women's ice hockey team that began play in the 2019–2020 season, Long Island University reached an agreement to use both the Northwell Health Ice Center and Islanders Iceworks as its home rinks. The university added a men's ice hockey team that began play in the 2020–2021 season and used the Northwell Health Ice Center as its practice facility. The men's team began playing its home games at the rink in October 2021.

== See also ==
- Nassau County Aquatics Center
