= LIU Sharks men's ice hockey =

- Current season
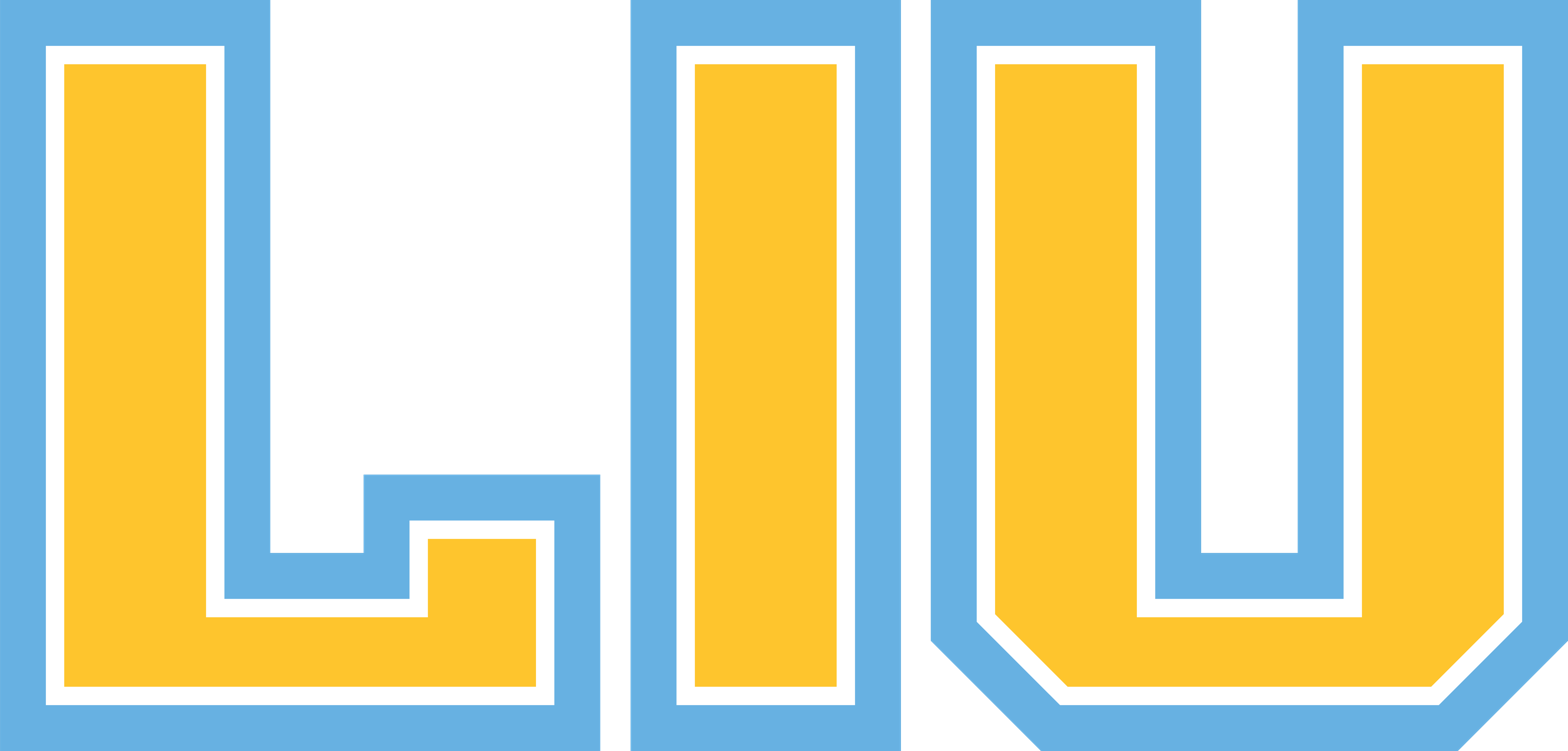
- University: Long Island University
- Conference: Independent
- First season: 2020–21
- Head coach: Brendan Riley; 1st season, 14–18–1 (.439)
- Arena: Northwell Health Ice Center; Brookville, New York
- Colors: Blue and gold

The LIU Sharks men's ice hockey team represents Long Island University in NCAA Division I ice hockey. The school announced their intention to begin a varsity schedule for the 2020–21 season on April 30, 2020. While starting out as an independent, the Sharks were a scheduling partner of Atlantic Hockey for at least their first season.

As of 2025, the Sharks are the only Division I program located in the New York City-area, though all their home games are played in Nassau County, outside of the New York city limits.

== History ==
After the college hockey season had been ended prematurely in March 2020, due to the COVID-19 pandemic, Long Island University announced their intention to found a men's Division I ice hockey team. The school had already established its women's team the year before and, despite the uncertainty for the upcoming season, LIU hired a coaching staff and recruited a full team of players.

Due to scheduling problems resulting from COVID-19, LIU entered into a scheduling partnership with Atlantic Hockey for its inaugural season. LIU would officially remain an independent program and would not be eligible for the conference tournament.

In April 2026, LIU announced that a holiday college tournament would be held at UBS Arena as part of a five-year partnership with the Islanders and the arena. The inaugural Empire State Holiday Invitational will be held over a two-day period in December 2026 and include the Sharks and three other teams.

== Coaches ==
Brett Riley was named as the team's first head coach on May 26, 2020. After five seasons, Riley left to take over at Ferris State and was replaced by his cousin, Brendan Riley.

As of the completion of 2025–26 season

| Tenure | Coach | Years | Record | Pct. |
|---|---|---|---|---|
| 2020–2025 | Brett Riley | 5 | 62–85–7 | .425 |
| 2025–Present | Brendan Riley | 1 | 14–18–1 | .439 |
| Totals | 2 coach | 6 seasons | 76–103–8 | .428 |

== Current roster ==
As of September 19, 2025.

| No. | Nat. | Player | Class | Pos | Height | Weight | DoB | Hometown | Previous team | NHL rights |
|---|---|---|---|---|---|---|---|---|---|---|
| 1 | (United States) | Michael Polston | Sophomore | G | 5' 11" (1.8 m) | 170 lb (77 kg) | 2004-10-07 | Cedarburg, Wisconsin | Provo Predators (NCDC) | — |
| 2 | (United States) | Trent Powell | Sophomore | D | 5' 10" (1.78 m) | 185 lb (84 kg) | 2004-03-09 | Soldotna, Alaska | Anchorage Wolverines (NAHL) | — |
| 3 | (United States) | A. J. Casperson | Senior | D | 6' 2" (1.88 m) | 190 lb (86 kg) | 2001-07-19 | Flower Mound, Texas | Janesville Jets (NAHL) | — |
| 4 | (United States) | Blake Dangos | Senior | D | 5' 10" (1.78 m) | 174 lb (79 kg) | 2002-04-08 | St. Louis, Missouri | American International (AHA) | — |
| 5 | (United States) | Trevor Griebel | Senior | D | 5' 10" (1.78 m) | 165 lb (75 kg) | 2001-03-07 | Tampa, Florida | Merrimack (HEA) | — |
| 7 | (Canada) | Jack Darby | Freshman | D | 6' 4" (1.93 m) | 190 lb (86 kg) | 2004-04-29 | New Hartford, New York | Anchorage Wolverines (NAHL) | — |
| 9 | (Canada) | Daniel Baldassarra | Senior | F | 5' 10" (1.78 m) | 170 lb (77 kg) | 2002-03-15 | Woodbridge, Ontario | North York Rangers (OJHL) | — |
| 10 | (Canada) | Heath Armstrong | Sophomore | F | 5' 8" (1.73 m) | 172 lb (78 kg) | 2002-05-12 | Calgary, Alberta | Brooks Bandits (AJHL) | — |
| 11 | (United States) | John McMahon | Freshman | F | 5' 11" (1.8 m) | 190 lb (86 kg) | 2004-05-25 | Oceanside, New York | New Jersey Titans (NAHL) | — |
| 12 | (Canada) | Brennan Nelson | Sophomore | F | 5' 11" (1.8 m) | 205 lb (93 kg) | 2003-03-21 | Edmonton, Alberta | West Kelowna Warriors (BCHL) | — |
| 15 | (United States) | Luca Leighton | Sophomore | F | 5' 8" (1.73 m) | 181 lb (82 kg) | 2003-08-13 | Old Brookville, New York | Rochester Jr. Americans (NAHL) | — |
| 17 | (Sweden) | Sixten Jennersjö | Sophomore | F | 5' 10" (1.78 m) | 179 lb (81 kg) | 2003-04-18 | Ekerö, Sweden | Northeast Generals (NAHL) | — |
| 18 | (Canada) | Anthony Lucarelli | Sophomore | F | 6' 2" (1.88 m) | 190 lb (86 kg) | 2003-10-16 | Chatham, Ontario | Powell River Kings (BCHL) | — |
| 19 | (Canada) | Chad Muller | Sophomore | F | 6' 1" (1.85 m) | 190 lb (86 kg) | 2003-07-13 | Kingston, Ontario | Minot Minotauros (NAHL) | — |
| 22 | (United States) | Nate Benoit | Junior | D | 6' 0" (1.83 m) | 183 lb (83 kg) | 2002-11-26 | Bow, New Hampshire | Quinnipiac (ECAC) | MIN, 182nd overall 2021 |
| 24 | (United States) | Luke Hause | Freshman | D | 6' 4" (1.93 m) | 194 lb (88 kg) | 2004-03-24 | Saint Paul, Minnesota | Kenai River Brown Bears (NAHL) | — |
| 26 | (Canada) | Isaac Lambert | Sophomore | F | 6' 0" (1.83 m) | 165 lb (75 kg) | 2003-08-28 | Victoriaville, Quebec | Salmon Arm Silverbacks (BCHL) | — |
| 27 | (Canada) | Dylan Kinch | Freshman | F | 5' 11" (1.8 m) | 185 lb (84 kg) | 2004-12-25 | Salzburg, Austria | Nanaimo Clippers (BCHL) | — |
| 28 | (Canada) | Garrett Valk | Junior | D | 6' 3" (1.91 m) | 205 lb (93 kg) | 2002-10-20 | North Vancouver, British Columbia | Langley Rivermen (BCHL) | — |
| 29 | (Canada) | Jaden Dyke | Freshman | G | 6' 4" (1.93 m) | 205 lb (93 kg) | 2004-08-06 | St. John's, Newfoundland | Rochester Jr. Americans (NAHL) | — |
| 30 | (Slovakia) | Daniel Duris | Sophomore | G | 6' 1" (1.85 m) | 181 lb (82 kg) | 2003-08-15 | Martin, Slovakia | Oklahoma Warriors (NAHL) | — |
| 31 | (United States) | Carter Bickle | Freshman | G | 6' 1" (1.85 m) | 181 lb (82 kg) | 2004-05-27 | Brooklin, Ontario | Milton Menace (OJHL) | — |
| 37 | (Canada) | Lukas Renaud | Freshman | G | 6' 2" (1.88 m) | 194 lb (88 kg) | 2004-01-06 | Montréal, Quebec | Calgary Canucks (AJHL) | — |
| 38 | (United States) | J. R. Perdion | Sophomore | F | 5' 11" (1.8 m) | 181 lb (82 kg) | 2003-06-25 | Strongsville, Ohio | Prince George Spruce Kings (BCHL) | — |
| 48 | (United States) | Nick Bernardo | Sophomore | D | 5' 9" (1.75 m) | 174 lb (79 kg) | 2003-05-13 | Hauppauge, New York | Maine Nordiques (NAHL) | — |
| 52 | (Finland) | Onni Leppänen | Junior | F | 5' 8" (1.73 m) | 165 lb (75 kg) | 2003-12-01 | Helsinki, Finland | Jokerit U20 (U20 SM-sarja) | — |
| 55 | (Canada) | Brett Rylance | Senior | F | 5' 9" (1.75 m) | 167 lb (76 kg) | 2001-08-03 | Edmonton, Alberta | American International (AHA) | — |
| 67 | (Canada) | Casey McDonald | Senior | F | 6' 1" (1.85 m) | 187 lb (85 kg) | 2001-05-10 | Plenty, Saskatchewan | American International (AHA) | — |
| 91 | (Canada) | Noah Serdachny | Senior | F | 6' 1" (1.85 m) | 190 lb (86 kg) | 2003-03-09 | Edmonton, Alberta | American International (AHA) | — |

== Statistical leaders ==
=== Career points leaders ===
| Player | Years | GP | G | A | Pts | PIM |
|---|---|---|---|---|---|---|
| Cade Mason | 2022–2025 | 89 | 10 | 67 | 77 | 22 |
| Josh Zary | 2022–2025 | 92 | 44 | 24 | 68 | 35 |
| Isiah Fox | 2021–2025 | 120 | 36 | 32 | 68 | 204 |
| Chris Pappas | 2022–2025 | 78 | 18 | 37 | 55 | 26 |
| Austin Brimmer | 2022–2025 | 97 | 23 | 32 | 55 | 54 |
| Nolan Welsh | 2020–2024 | 109 | 19 | 33 | 52 | 49 |
| Noah Kane | 2022–2024 | 67 | 16 | 31 | 47 | 62 |
| J. R. Perdion | 2024–Present | 64 | 15 | 28 | 43 | 37 |
| Anthony Vincent | 2022–2023 | 36 | 17 | 20 | 37 | 78 |
| Jordan Di Cicco | 2020–2024 | 109 | 12 | 25 | 37 | 32 |

=== Career goaltending leaders ===
GP = Games played; Min = Minutes played; W = Wins; L = Losses; T = Ties; GA = Goals against; SO = Shutouts; SV% = Save percentage; GAA = Goals against average

minimum 1,000 minutes played

| Player | Years | GP | Min | W | L | T | GA | SO | SV% | GAA |
|---|---|---|---|---|---|---|---|---|---|---|
| Noah Rupprecht | 2023–2025 | 30 | 1,402 | 17 | 7 | 0 | 53 | 0 | .901 | 2.27 |
| Brandon Perrone | 2021–2024 | 44 | 2,180 | 16 | 18 | 1 | 102 | 3 | .891 | 2.81 |
| Daniel Duris | 2024–Present | 35 | 1,986 | 15 | 18 | 2 | 105 | 2 | .901 | 3.17 |
| Vinnie Purpura | 2020–2023 | 47 | 2,543 | 12 | 30 | 1 | 142 | 1 | .893 | 3.35 |
| Kris Carlson | 2021–2022 | 18 | 1,049 | 4 | 11 | 3 | 62 | 2 | .887 | 3.55 |

Statistics current through the end of the 2025-26 season.

== See also ==
- LIU Sharks women's ice hockey
