= 2023–24 Alaska Nanooks men's ice hockey season =

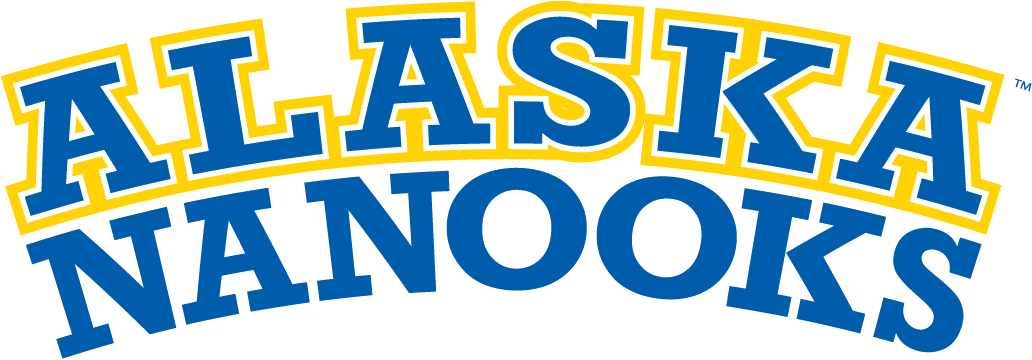
- Conference: Independent
- Home ice: Carlson Center

Rankings
- USCHO: NR
- USA Hockey: NR

Record
- Overall: 17–14–3
- Home: 7–5–1
- Road: 9–8–2
- Neutral: 1–1–0

Coaches and captains
- Head coach: Erik Largen
- Assistant coaches: Chris Brown; Lenny Hoffman; Eric Yancey
- Captain(s): Harrison Israels; Jonny Sorenson
- Alternate captain(s): T.J. Lloyd; Brady Risk

The 2023–24 Alaska Nanooks men's ice hockey season was the 74th season of play for the program and 39th at the Division I level. The Nanooks represented the University of Alaska Fairbanks and were coached by Erik Largen in his 5th season.

== Season ==
After narrowly missing out on the NCAA tournament in 2023, Alaska entered the year hoping for another chance at postseason play. The primary goal for the club would be to replace the stellar effort of the now-graduated Matt Radomsky in goal. That task fell first to transfer Pierce Charleson but he had a tough time at the start. The Nanooks opened the year by dropping a match to Denver that saw all three goaltenders in goal. Charleson and nominal backup Lassi Lehti allowed 4 and 3 goals respectively while Will Hambley stopped all the shots he faced (albeit in only 4 minutes). Hambley got the start in the second game and allowed the Pioneers to make a fool of him as well. After the poor start, Pierce Charleson settled into the starting role with a winning road trip over the next two weeks against a pair of ranked opponents. Alaska's offense appeared to be a strength early in the year but a sweep at the hands of Northern Michigan around Thanksgiving demonstrated that the team still had some work to do.

Despite some hiccups, Alaska possessed a winning record by Christmas and had a chance to move up into an at-large berth if it performed well in the second half of the season. The Nanooks kicked off their return with an appearance at the Great Lakes Invitational. An overtime loss in the semifinal stopped the team from getting anywhere in the PairWise rankings but that could easily be rectified the following week when they faced #4 North Dakota. Anything positive could have raised the teams tournament hopes a great deal, however, the Nanooks ended up getting swept in the series. The losses did not end the team's postseason hopes immediately, however, they gave Alaska no room for error in the remainder of their schedule.

The Nanooks still had four games against Arizona State, a ranked team, but the rest of their slate was filled with average-to-bad teams that would not provide much help even if the Nanooks were to sweep every match. For Alaska to make the postseason, they would likely have to run the table or at least come close. Unfortunately, their old rival Alaska Anchorage had other ideas. Still smarting over losing the previous 10 games, the Seawolves redoubled their efforts and forced Alaska into a tie and then followed that up with their first win against the Nanooks in over 4 years. The loss started a 4-game slump in Alaska's offense and by the time the Nanooks pulled out of the dive, their postseason hopes had been shattered. With nothing to lose, Lehti was given the starting job at the end of the season and performed well over a 4-week stretch. The wins helped to lift the team's record above .500 for the season and gave a possible glimpse at the Nanooks' future starting goalie.

== Departures ==
Player	Position	Nationality	Cause
Daniel Allin	Goaltender	Canada	Left program (retired)
Karl Falk	Defenseman	Sweden	Transferred to St. Cloud State
Simon Falk	Forward	Sweden	Transferred to Augustana
Markuss Komuls	Defenseman	Latvia	Graduation (signed with Trois-Rivières Lions)
Ricards Landmanis	Defenseman	Latvia	Left program (retired)
Connor Mylymok	Forward	United States	Transferred to Niagara
Zachary Power	Forward	Canada	Left program (retired)
Garrett Pyke	Defenseman	Canada	Graduate transfer to North Dakota
Matt Radomsky	Goaltender	Canada	Graduation (signed with Calgary Wranglers)
Quinn Rudrud	Forward	United States	Transferred to Augustana

== Recruiting ==
Player	Position	Nationality	Age	Notes
Cade Ahrenholz	Forward	United States	20	Lakeville, MN; transfer from Colorado College
Edvards Bergmanis	Forward	Latvia	21	Spilve, LAT
Dawson Bruneski	Defenseman	Canada	24	Camrose, AB; graduate transfer from Maine
Pierce Charleson	Goaltender	Canada	23	Aurora, ON; transfer from Michigan State
Chase Dafoe	Forward	United States	21	Beverly, MA; transfer from Providence
William Hambley	Goaltender	Canada	21	Cole Harbour, NS; transfer from Western Michigan
William Lawson-Body	Forward	United States	21	Grand Forks, ND
Caleb MacDonald	Defenseman	Canada	20	Cambridge, ON
Derek Pys	Defenseman	Canada	21	Ayr, ON
Broten Sabo	Defenseman	United States	21	Rosemount, MN
Filip Wiberg	Forward	Norway	21	Trondheim, NOR

== Roster ==
As of September 20, 2023.

No.	Nat.	Player	Class	Pos	Height	Weight	DoB	Hometown	Previous team	NHL rights
1	(Canada)	Will Hambley	Sophomore	G	6' 3" (1.91 m)	190 lb (86 kg)	2002-04-29	Cole Harbour, Nova Scotia	Western Michigan (NCHC)	—
4	(United States)	Jonny Sorenson (C)	Graduate	F	6' 1" (1.85 m)	180 lb (82 kg)	1999-09-21	St. Louis Park, Minnesota	Minnesota (Big Ten)	—
6	(Canada)	T. J. Lloyd (A)	Graduate	D	5' 9" (1.75 m)	175 lb (79 kg)	1999-11-15	Lloydminster, Saskatchewan	Bowling Green (CCHA)	—
7	(United States)	Broten Sabo	Freshman	D	6' 2" (1.88 m)	194 lb (88 kg)	2002-08-09	Rosemount, Minnesota	St. Cloud (NAHL)	—
8	(United States)	Will Hilfiker	Sophomore	D	6' 2" (1.88 m)	205 lb (93 kg)	2001-08-07	Middletown, New Jersey	Bonnyville (AJHL)	—
9	(Canada)	Caleb MacDonald	Freshman	D	6' 4" (1.93 m)	216 lb (98 kg)	2002-11-29	Cambridge, Ontario	Whitecourt (AJHL)	—
10	(United States)	William Lawson-Body	Freshman	F	5' 10" (1.78 m)	170 lb (77 kg)	2002-04-04	Grand Forks, North Dakota	Oklahoma (NAHL)	—
11	(Canada)	Brady Risk (A)	Junior	F	5' 9" (1.75 m)	175 lb (79 kg)	1999-03-16	Medicine Hat, Alberta	Drumheller (AJHL)	—
12	(Canada)	A. J. Macaulay	Sophomore	D	5' 9" (1.75 m)	175 lb (79 kg)	2002-04-12	Bonnyville, Alberta	Bonnyville (AJHL)	—
13	(Canada)	Xavier Jean-Louis	Sophomore	D	6' 5" (1.96 m)	205 lb (93 kg)	2001-06-25	Montreal, Quebec	Austin (NAHL)	—
14	(Russia)	Anton Rubtsov	Junior	F	5' 10" (1.78 m)	165 lb (75 kg)	1999-03-06	Saint Petersburg, Russia	Shreveport (NAHL)	—
15	(Canada)	Braden Birnie	Sophomore	F	6' 2" (1.88 m)	195 lb (88 kg)	2001-08-19	Weyburn, Saskatchewan	Steinbach (MJHL)	—
16	(Canada)	Chase Dubois	Junior (RS)	F	5' 9" (1.75 m)	160 lb (73 kg)	1998-03-12	Williams Lake, British Columbia	West Kelowna (BCHL)	—
17	(Canada)	Derek Pys	Freshman	D	6' 0" (1.83 m)	172 lb (78 kg)	2002-04-30	Ayr, Ontario	Sherwood Park (AJHL)	—
18	(Latvia)	Edvards Bergmanis	Freshman	F	5' 10" (1.78 m)	170 lb (77 kg)	2002-04-04	Spilve, Latvia	Peoria (NA3HL)	—
20	(United States)	Cade Ahrenholz	Sophomore	F	6' 3" (1.91 m)	218 lb (99 kg)	2002-11-30	Lakeville, Minnesota	Colorado College (NCHC)	—
24	(Canada)	Harrison Israels (C)	Junior	F	6' 1" (1.85 m)	200 lb (91 kg)	1999-09-01	Mississauga, Ontario	Oakville (OJHL)	—
25	(England)	Cade Neilson	Sophomore	F	6' 0" (1.83 m)	193 lb (88 kg)	2001-05-15	Nottingham, England	Aberdeen (NAHL)	—
26	(United States)	Payton Matsui	Junior	F	5' 7" (1.7 m)	160 lb (73 kg)	2000-04-15	Lakeville, Minnesota	Aberdeen (NAHL)	—
27	(Canada)	Matteo Pecchia	Junior	F	5' 10" (1.78 m)	185 lb (84 kg)	2000-06-05	Nobleton, Ontario	Western Michigan (NCHC)	—
28	(Canada)	Brayden Nicholetts	Junior	F	5' 11" (1.8 m)	180 lb (82 kg)	1999-08-27	Spruce Grove, Alberta	Spruce Grove (AJHL)	—
29	(Canada)	Pierce Charleson	Senior	G	6' 2" (1.88 m)	193 lb (88 kg)	2000-02-27	Aurora, Ontario	Michigan State (Big Ten)	—
34	(United States)	Kyle Gaffney	Sophomore	F	6' 0" (1.83 m)	180 lb (82 kg)	2001-09-05	Plymouth, Michigan	Aberdeen (NAHL)	—
35	(Finland)	Lassi Lehti	Sophomore	G	6' 3" (1.91 m)	210 lb (95 kg)	2001-11-29	Espoo, Finland	Minot (NAHL)	—
36	(Norway)	Filip Wiberg	Freshman	F	6' 2" (1.88 m)	201 lb (91 kg)	2002-07-15	Trondheim, Norway	Maine (NAHL)	—
37	(Canada)	Chase Dafoe	Sophomore	F	6' 3" (1.91 m)	200 lb (91 kg)	2002-02-25	Peachland, British Columbia	Providence (HEA)	—
38	(Latvia)	Arvils Bergmanis	Junior	D	5' 11" (1.8 m)	187 lb (85 kg)	1999-12-29	Riga, Latvia	Olimp Riga (LHL)	—
39	(Canada)	Dawson Bruneski	Graduate	F	5' 11" (1.8 m)	195 lb (88 kg)	1999-06-24	Camrose, Alberta	Maine (HEA)	—
40	(United States)	Matt Koethe	Junior	F	5' 10" (1.78 m)	185 lb (84 kg)	1999-09-28	Minnetonka, Minnesota	Fairbanks (NAHL)	—

== Standings ==
2023–24 NCAA Division I Independent ice hockey standings
	Overall record					
	GP	W	L	T	GF	GA
Alaska	34	17	14	3	110	86
Alaska Anchorage	34	15	17	2	95	105
Arizona State	38	24	8	6	129	94
Lindenwood	28	6	18	4	74	121
Long Island	37	16	20	1	115	103
Stonehill	36	2	34	0	62	213
Rankings: USCHO.com Top 20 Poll

== Schedule and results ==
Date	Time	Opponent^{#}	Rank^{#}	Site	TV	Decision	Result	Attendance	Record
Exhibition
September 30	7:07 pm	Vancouver Island*		Carlson Center • Fairbanks, Alaska (Exhibition)	FloHockey	Charleson	W 8–1		
Regular Season
October 7	7:07 pm	#4 Denver*		Carlson Center • Fairbanks, Alaska	FloHockey	Charleson	L 3–7	1,962	0–1–0
October 8	5:07 pm	#4 Denver*		Carlson Center • Fairbanks, Alaska	FloHockey	Hambley	L 2–5	1,421	0–2–0
October 13	3:07 pm	at #9 Michigan Tech*		MacInnes Student Ice Arena • Houghton, Michigan	FloHockey	Charleson	W 4–1	3,454	1–2–0
October 14	2:07 pm	at #9 Michigan Tech*		MacInnes Student Ice Arena • Houghton, Michigan	FloHockey	Charleson	T 2–2 ^{OT}	3,454	1–2–1
October 20	4:30 pm	at #20 St. Cloud State*		Herb Brooks National Hockey Center • St. Cloud, Minnesota	Fox 9+	Charleson	L 1–4	3,626	1–3–1
October 21	3:00 pm	at #20 St. Cloud State*		Herb Brooks National Hockey Center • St. Cloud, Minnesota	Fox 9+	Charleson	W 5–2	3,314	2–3–1
November 3	7:07 pm	Alaska Anchorage*		Carlson Center • Fairbanks, Alaska (Governor's Cup)	FloHockey	Charleson	W 6–1	3,112	3–3–1
November 4	7:07 pm	Alaska Anchorage*		Carlson Center • Fairbanks, Alaska (Governor's Cup)	FloHockey	Charleson	W 5–4	4,086	4–3–1
November 10	3:00 pm	at Stonehill*		Bridgewater Ice Arena • Bridgewater, Massachusetts	NEC Front Row	Charleson	W 3–1	311	5–3–1
November 11	12:00 pm	at Stonehill*		Bridgewater Ice Arena • Bridgewater, Massachusetts	NEC Front Row	Charleson	W 8–1	318	6–3–1
November 17	3:07 pm	at Northern Michigan*		Berry Events Center • Marquette, Michigan	FloHockey	Charleson	L 1–3	2,303	6–4–1
November 18	2:07 pm	at Northern Michigan*		Berry Events Center • Marquette, Michigan	FloHockey	Charleson	L 1–3	2,381	6–5–1
December 1	7:07 pm	at Alaska Anchorage*		Avis Alaska Sports Complex • Anchorage, Alaska (Governor's Cup)		Charleson	W 5–0	951	7–5–1
December 2	6:07 pm	at Alaska Anchorage*		Avis Alaska Sports Complex • Anchorage, Alaska (Governor's Cup)		Charleson	W 3–1	966	8–5–1
December 15	7:07 pm	Augustana*		Carlson Center • Fairbanks, Alaska	FloHockey	Charleson	W 5–2	2,343	9–5–1
December 16	7:07 pm	Augustana*		Carlson Center • Fairbanks, Alaska	FloHockey	Charleson	L 2–3 ^{OT}	2,892	9–6–1
Great Lakes Invitational
December 28	11:30 am	vs. Michigan Tech*		Van Andel Arena • Grand Rapids, Michigan (Great Lakes Invitational Semifinal)	FloHockey	Charleson	L 2–3 ^{OT}	6,880	9–7–1
December 29	11:30 am	vs. Ferris State*		Van Andel Arena • Grand Rapids, Michigan (Great Lakes Invitational Consolation Game)	FloHockey	Charleson	W 3–2	—	10–7–1
January 5	4:07 pm	at #4 North Dakota*		Ralph Engelstad Arena • Grand Forks, North Dakota	Midco	Charleson	L 4–6	11,190	10–8–1
January 6	3:07 pm	at #4 North Dakota*		Ralph Engelstad Arena • Grand Forks, North Dakota	Midco	Charleson	L 2–6	11,656	10–9–1
January 13	7:07 pm	Alaska Anchorage*		Carlson Center • Fairbanks, Alaska (Governor's Cup)	FloHockey	Charleson	T 2–2 ^{OT}	3,013	10–9–2
January 26	10:30 am	at Long Island*		Northwell Health Ice Center • East Meadow, New York	ESPN+	Charleson	W 7–3	255	11–9–2
January 27	10:00 am	at Long Island*		Northwell Health Ice Center • East Meadow, New York	ESPN+	Charleson	W 3–1	350	12–9–2
February 3	5:07 pm	at Alaska Anchorage*		Avis Alaska Sports Complex • Anchorage, Alaska (Governor's Cup)		Charleson	L 2–4	712	12–10–2
February 9	5:00 pm	at #18 Arizona State*		Mullett Arena • Tempe, Arizona		Charleson	L 0–2	4,769	12–11–2
February 10	3:00 pm	at #18 Arizona State*		Mullett Arena • Tempe, Arizona		Charleson	L 2–4	4,843	12–12–2
February 16	7:07 pm	Long Island*		Carlson Center • Fairbanks, Alaska	FloHockey	Charleson	L 0–4	2,024	12–13–2
February 17	7:07 pm	Long Island*		Carlson Center • Fairbanks, Alaska	FloHockey	Lehti	W 4–0	1,776	13–13–2
February 23	7:07 pm	#18 Arizona State*		Carlson Center • Fairbanks, Alaska	FloHockey	Lehti	W 3–1	2,209	14–13–2
February 24	7:07 pm	#18 Arizona State*		Carlson Center • Fairbanks, Alaska	FloHockey	Lehti	L 3–4 ^{OT}	3,984	14–14–2
March 1	4:07 pm	at Augustana*		Midco Arena • Sioux Falls, South Dakota	FloHockey	Charleson	T 2–2 ^{OT}	2,667	14–14–3
March 2	3:07 pm	at Augustana*		Midco Arena • Sioux Falls, South Dakota	FloHockey	Lehti	W 2–0	3,097	15–14–3
March 6	7:07 pm	Stonehill*		Carlson Center • Fairbanks, Alaska	FloHockey	Lehti	W 9–1	1,978	16–14–3
March 7	7:07 pm	Stonehill*		Carlson Center • Fairbanks, Alaska	FloHockey	Charleson	W 4–1	2,001	17–14–3
*Non-conference game. ^{#}Rankings from USCHO.com Poll. All times are in Alaska Time. Source:

== Scoring statistics ==
Name	Position	Games	Goals	Assists	Points	PIM
Brady Risk	F	33	13	20	33	16
Anton Rubtsov	F	30	8	20	28	14
Harrison Israels	C	33	20	6	26	14
Payton Matsui	F	34	5	15	20	6
Arvils Bergmanis	D	31	2	17	19	39
T. J. Lloyd	D	34	3	16	19	33
Cade Neilson	C	31	5	14	19	22
Braden Birnie	F	33	3	14	17	21
Jonny Sorenson	F	33	8	7	15	33
A. J. Macaulay	D	34	5	10	15	14
Caleb MacDonald	D	31	4	10	14	38
Chase Dafoe	F	31	7	7	14	54
Matt Koethe	F	31	3	10	13	10
Chase Dubois	F	30	6	7	13	19
Kyle Gaffney	F	34	2	8	10	16
Dawson Bruneski	D	29	2	4	6	70
William Lawson-Body	F	10	1	4	5	15
Cade Ahrenholz	F	23	5	0	5	10
Brayden Nicholetts	F	17	3	1	4	10
Xavier Jean-Louis	D	26	2	2	4	20
Broten Sabo	D	28	1	2	3	10
Will Hilfiker	D	12	1	0	1	15
Filip Wiberg	F	3	1	0	1	4
Derek Pys	D	4	0	1	1	17
Lassi Lehti	G	7	0	0	0	0
Matteo Pecchia	LW	1	0	0	0	2
Will Hambley	G	4	0	0	0	0
Edvards Bergmanis	F	2	0	0	0	0
Pierce Charleson	G	29	0	0	0	0
Total			110	194	304	522

== Goaltending statistics ==
Name	Games	Minutes	Wins	Losses	Ties	Goals against	Saves	Shut outs	SV %	GAA
Lassi Lehti	9	338:46	4	1	0	10	134	2	.931	1.77
Pierce Charleson	29	1635:43	13	11	3	67	605	1	.900	2.46
Will Hambley	6	51:35	0	1	0	3	11	0	.786	3.49
Empty Net	-	31:18	-	-	-	6	-	-	-	-
Total	34	2057:22	17	14	3	86	751	3	.897	2.51

== Rankings ==
Poll	Week																										
Poll	Pre	1	2	3	4	5	6	7	8	9	10	11	12	13	14	15	16	17	18	19	20	21	22	23	24	25	26 (Final)
USCHO.com	NR	NR	NR	NR	NR	NR	NR	NR	NR	NR	NR	–	NR	NR	NR	NR	NR	NR	NR	NR	NR	NR	NR	NR	NR	–	NR
USA Hockey	NR	NR	NR	NR	NR	NR	NR	NR	NR	NR	NR	NR	–	NR	NR	NR	NR	NR	NR	NR	NR	NR	NR	NR	NR	NR	NR

Note: USCHO did not release a poll in weeks 11 and 25.
Note: USA Hockey did not release a poll in week 12.
