= 2025–26 Alaska Anchorage Seawolves men's ice hockey season =

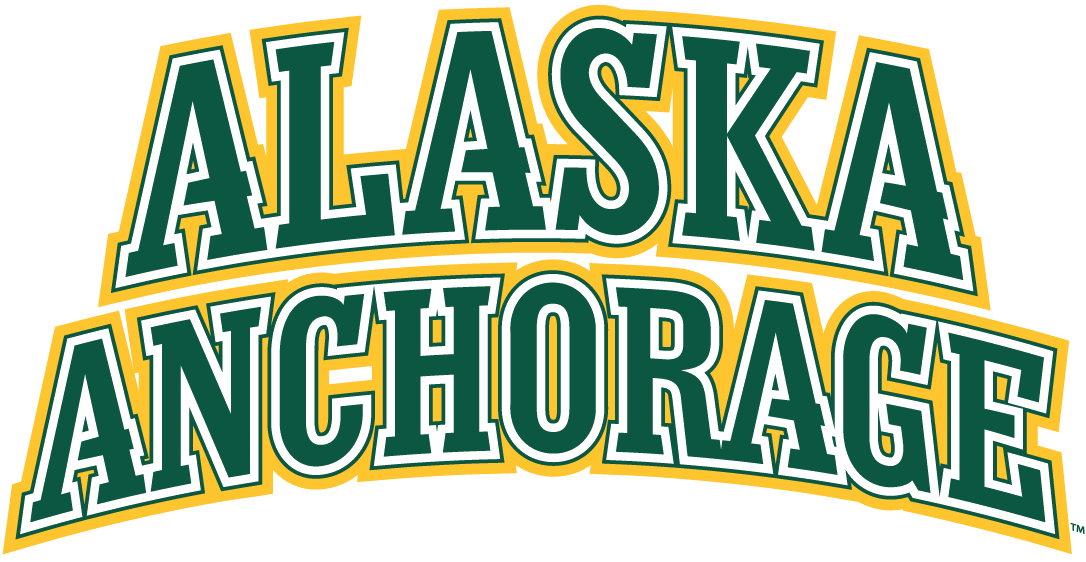
- Conference: Independent
- Home ice: Avis Alaska Sports Complex; Sullivan Arena

Rankings
- USCHO: NR
- USA Hockey: NR

Record
- Overall: 5–27–1
- Home: 1–10–0
- Road: 4–14–1
- Neutral: 0–3–0

Coaches and captains
- Head coach: Matt Shasby
- Assistant coaches: Chris Kamal; Aaron McPheters
- Captain: Conor Cole

The 2025–26 Alaska Anchorage Seawolves men's ice hockey season was the 45th season of play for the program and the 40th at the Division I level. The Seawolves represented the University of Alaska Anchorage in the 2025–26 NCAA Division I men's ice hockey season, played their home games at the Avis Alaska Sports Complex and were coached by Matt Shasby in his 4th season.

== Season ==
Alaska Anchorage had an utterly miserable season in 2026. The offense was completely toothless, averaging just 1.72 goals per game for the season (2nd worst in the nation). At the same time, the defense was porous, surrendering 35.7 shots against per match (3rd worst in the nation). Tyler Krivtsov, the nominal started, was probably the most consistent performer for the Seawolves but he got very little help from his teammates. Anchorage did have a few notable departures from their wretched campaign, most notably an overtime win over tournament-bound Denver in late-October, but those moment were fleeting.

The Seawolves did take part in the inaugural United Collegiate Hockey Cup but managed to be the only club in the five-team field who failed to win a single game.

== Departures ==
Player	Position	Nationality	Cause
Tanner Edwards	Forward	United States	Graduation (signed with Florida Everblades)
Dylan Finlay	Defenseman	Canada	Transferred to Northeastern
Dominic Foglia	Defenseman	United States	Left program mid-season (retired)
Alex Gomez	Forward	United States	Transferred to Utica
Davis Goukler	Defenseman	United States	Transferred to Utica
Maximilion Helgeson	Forward	United States	Graduate transfer to Miami
Matthew Johnson	Forward	Canada	Left program (retired)
Connor Marritt	Forward	Canada	Graduation (signed with Tahoe Knight Monsters)
Porter Schachle	Forward	United States	Graduation (signed with Worcester Railers)
Will Schimek	Defenseman	United States	Graduation (retired)
Gunnar VanDamme	Defenseman	United States	Transferred to Rensselaer
Jarred White	Forward	Canada	Graduation (signed with Diables Rouges de Valenciennes)

== Recruiting ==
Player	Position	Nationality	Age	Notes
Tanyon Bajzer	Forward	United States	23	Cleveland, OH; transfer from Miami
Henry Bartle	Forward	United States	22	Blaine, MN; transfer from Michigan Tech
Dominic Foglia	Defenseman	United States	23	Tinton Falls, NJ; transfer from Colgate
Luke Helgeson	Defenseman	United States	20	Anchorage, AK
David Jesus	Defenseman	Canada	23	Toronto, ON; transfer from Windsor
Luke Johnson	Forward	United States	23	St. Cloud, MN; transfer from Alaska
Judah Makway	Forward	Canada	21	Trail, BC
Isaac Ménard	Defenseman	Canada	21	Trois-Rivières, QC
Bryce Monrean	Forward	United States	22	Anchorage, AK; transfer from Alaska
Aaron Reierson	Forward	United States	20	Moorhead, MN; joined mid-season
Camden Shasby	Defenseman	United States	21	Dollard-des-Ormeaux, QC
Oren Shtrom	Forward	Canada	21	Dollard-des-Ormeaux, QC
Tye Spencer	Forward	Canada	21	Saskatoon, SK
Jacob Terpstra	Forward	United States	20	Shelby Township, MI; joined mid-season

== Roster ==
As of August 27, 2025.

No.	Nat.	Player	Class	Pos	Height	Weight	DoB	Hometown	Previous team	NHL rights
2	(Canada)	Ethan Warrener	Sophomore	D	6' 1" (1.85 m)	175 lb (79 kg)	2003-05-15	Calgary, Alberta	Trail Smoke Eaters (BCHL)	—
3	(United States)	Joey Potter	Junior	D	5' 11" (1.8 m)	185 lb (84 kg)	2003-05-09	Pittsburgh, Pennsylvania	Union (ECAC)	—
4	(Canada)	Isaac Ménard	Freshman	D	5' 10" (1.78 m)	174 lb (79 kg)	2004-04-08	Trois-Rivières, Quebec	Shawinigan Cataractes (QMJHL)	—
5	(Slovakia)	Pavol Funtek	Sophomore	D	6' 6" (1.98 m)	207 lb (94 kg)	2003-07-03	Bratislava, Slovakia	Minot Minotauros (NAHL)	—
6	(United States)	Brandon Lajoie	Senior	F	5' 11" (1.8 m)	180 lb (82 kg)	2001-10-18	Eagle River, Alaska	St. Cloud Norsemen (NAHL)	—
7	(United States)	Camden Shasby	Freshman	D	5' 9" (1.75 m)	165 lb (75 kg)	2004-12-02	Anchorage, Alaska	Anchorage Wolverines (NAHL)	—
8	(Canada)	Oren Shtrom	Freshman	F	5' 10" (1.78 m)	185 lb (84 kg)	2004-09-28	Dollard-des-Ormeaux, Quebec	Kamloops Blazers (WHL)	—
9	(Canada)	Conor Cole (C)	Senior	F	5' 10" (1.78 m)	183 lb (83 kg)	2001-10-28	St. John's, Newfoundland and Labrador	Maryland Black Bears (NAHL)	—
10	(Canada)	Logan Acheson	Senior	D	5' 11" (1.8 m)	173 lb (78 kg)	2002-04-24	Edmonton, Alberta	Bemidji State (CCHA)	—
11	(United States)	Dylan Contreras	Sophomore	F	5' 7" (1.7 m)	165 lb (75 kg)	2003-05-23	Yorba Linda, California	Kenai River Brown Bears (NAHL)	—
12	(United States)	J. P. Steele	Sophomore	D	6' 2" (1.88 m)	185 lb (84 kg)	2003-10-08	Franklin, Michigan	Maine Nordiques (NAHL)	—
13	(Canada)	Luke Helgeson	Freshman	D	6' 0" (1.83 m)	205 lb (93 kg)	2004-11-03	Anchorage, Alaska	Colorado Grit (NAHL)	—
14	(United States)	Henry Bartle	Junior	F	6' 2" (1.88 m)	185 lb (84 kg)	2003-06-03	Blaine, Minnesota	Michigan Tech (CCHA)	—
15	(United States)	Dominic Foglia	Junior	D	6' 1" (1.85 m)	190 lb (86 kg)	2002-04-09	Tinton Falls, New Jersey	Colgate (ECAC)	—
15	(United States)	Jacob Terpstra	Freshman	F	6' 0" (1.83 m)	190 lb (86 kg)	2005-05-11	Shelby Township, Michigan	Alberni Valley Bulldogs (BCHL)	—
16	(Canada)	Ryan Johnson	Sophomore	F	5' 10" (1.78 m)	181 lb (82 kg)	2003-05-05	Calgary, Alberta	New Mexico Ice Wolves (NAHL)	—
17	(United States)	Bryce Monrean	Sophomore	F	5' 11" (1.8 m)	165 lb (75 kg)	2003-05-28	Anchorage, Alaska	Alaska (NCAA)	—
18	(Canada)	Judah Makway	Freshman	F	6' 3" (1.91 m)	190 lb (86 kg)	2004-09-28	Trail, British Columbia	Trail Smoke Eaters (BCHL)	—
19	(Canada)	Nolan Gagnon	Sophomore	D	5' 10" (1.78 m)	165 lb (75 kg)	2003-04-18	Metcalfe, Ontario	Amarillo Wranglers (NAHL)	—
20	(Canada)	Adam Parsons	Sophomore	F	6' 0" (1.83 m)	170 lb (77 kg)	2003-10-22	Port Moody, British Columbia	Trail Smoke Eaters (BCHL)	—
21	(United States)	Ben Anderson	Junior	F	6' 5" (1.96 m)	210 lb (95 kg)	2002-03-01	Crystal, Minnesota	Wisconsin Windigo (NAHL)	—
22	(United States)	Aiden Westin	Junior	F	6' 1" (1.85 m)	185 lb (84 kg)	2002-02-06	Anchorage, Alaska	Anchorage Wolverines (NAHL)	—
23	(United States)	Aaron Reierson	Freshman	F	6' 1" (1.85 m)	183 lb (83 kg)	2005-02-27	Moorhead, Minnesota	Langley Rivermen (BCHL)	—
25	(Canada)	David Jesus	Junior	D	6' 4" (1.93 m)	187 lb (85 kg)	2002-05-30	Toronto, Ontario	Windsor (OUA)	—
27	(United States)	Dimitry Kebreau	Sophomore	F	5' 10" (1.78 m)	181 lb (82 kg)	2003-06-16	Silver Spring, Maryland	Maryland Black Bears (NAHL)	—
28	(United States)	Tanyon Bajzer	Junior	F	6' 1" (1.85 m)	180 lb (82 kg)	2002-08-25	Shaker Heights, Ohio	Miami (NCHC)	—
29	(Canada)	Tye Spencer	Freshman	F	5' 8" (1.73 m)	150 lb (68 kg)	2004-06-27	Saskatoon, Saskatchewan	Wenatchee Wild (WHL)	—
30	(United States)	Tyler Krivtsov	Sophomore	G	6' 2" (1.88 m)	190 lb (86 kg)	2003-12-02	Santa Clarita, California	Fairbanks Ice Dogs (AJHL)	—
31	(United States)	Bryant Marks	Sophomore	G	6' 0" (1.83 m)	174 lb (79 kg)	2004-03-12	Wasilla, Alaska	Kenai River Brown Bears (NAHL)	—
33	(Hungary)	Greg Orosz	Junior	G	6' 3" (1.91 m)	190 lb (86 kg)	2002-08-28	Győr, Hungary	Odessa Jackalopes (NAHL)	—
37	(United States)	Luke Johnson	Senior	F	5' 9" (1.75 m)	165 lb (75 kg)	2001-10-15	St. Cloud, Minnesota	Alaska (NCAA)	—
43	(Canada)	Karter McNarland	Sophomore	F	5' 11" (1.8 m)	170 lb (77 kg)	2003-02-10	Saskatoon, Saskatchewan	Powell River Kings (BCHL)	—

== Standings ==
2025–26 NCAA Division I Independent ice hockey standings
	Overall record					
	GP	W	L	T	GF	GA
Alaska*	33	15	15	3	96	99
Alaska Anchorage	33	5	27	1	57	134
Lindenwood	30	15	15	0	105	114
Long Island	32	13	18	1	97	109
Stonehill	35	10	22	3	88	118
Championship: March 7, 2026 * indicates tournament champion Rankings: USCHO.com Top 20 Poll

== Schedule and results ==
Date	Time	Opponent^{#}	Rank^{#}	Site	TV	Decision	Result	Attendance	Record
Exhibition
September 26	7:00 pm	Briercrest*		Avis Alaska Sports Complex • Anchorage, Alaska (Exhibition)		Orosz	W 12–0		
Regular Season
October 3	7:00 pm	Bemidji State*		Avis Alaska Sports Complex • Anchorage, Alaska		Orosz	L 2–9	775	0–1–0
October 4	5:00 pm	Bemidji State*		Avis Alaska Sports Complex • Anchorage, Alaska		Marks	L 0–5	651	0–2–0
October 24	4:00 pm	at St. Cloud State*		Herb Brooks National Hockey Center • St. Cloud, Minnesota	The CW	Krivtsov	L 2–5	3,014	0–3–0
October 25	3:00 pm	at St. Cloud State*		Herb Brooks National Hockey Center • St. Cloud, Minnesota	The CW	Marks	L 1–5	4,126	0–4–0
October 31	5:00 pm	at #6 Denver*		Magness Arena • Denver, Colorado		Krivtsov	W 4–3 ^{OT}	5,031	1–4–0
November 1	4:00 pm	at #6 Denver*		Magness Arena • Denver, Colorado	Altitude	Krivtsov	L 0–6	6,235	1–5–0
November 14	3:00 pm	at Bentley*		Bentley Arena • Waltham, Massachusetts	FloHockey	Krivtsov	L 1–2 ^{OT}	1,667	1–6–0
November 15	2:00 pm	at Bentley*		Bentley Arena • Waltham, Massachusetts	FloHockey	Krivtsov	W 3–2	1,267	2–6–0
November 18	3:00 pm	at Stonehill*		Warrior Ice Arena • Boston, Massachusetts	NEC Front Row	Krivtsov	W 4–0	134	3–6–0
November 19	3:00 pm	at Brown*		Meehan Auditorium • Providence, Rhode Island	ESPN+	Krivtsov	L 2–5	529	3–7–0
November 20	3:00 pm	at Holy Cross*		Hart Center • Worcester, Massachusetts	FloHockey	Orosz	L 2–7	839	3–8–0
November 23	10:00 am	at Holy Cross*		Hart Center • Worcester, Massachusetts	FloHockey	Krivtsov	L 0–1	683	3–9–0
December 5	7:00 pm	Stonehill*		Avis Alaska Sports Complex • Anchorage, Alaska	YouTube	Krivtsov	L 2–3	803	3–10–0
December 6	5:00 pm	Stonehill*		Avis Alaska Sports Complex • Anchorage, Alaska	YouTube	Marks	L 3–4 ^{OT}	840	3–11–0
December 10	7:00 pm	Maryville*		Avis Alaska Sports Complex • Anchorage, Alaska (Exhibition)		Orosz	W 4–0		
Desert Hockey Classic
January 2	5:00 pm	at Arizona State*		Mullett Arena • Tempe, Arizona (Desert Hockey Semifinal)		Krivtsov	L 2–7	5,050	3–12–0
January 3	3:00 pm	vs. Michigan Tech*		Mullett Arena • Tempe, Arizona (Desert Hockey Consolation Game)		Marks	L 0–5	—	3–13–0
January 9	4:00 pm	at #3 Wisconsin*		Kohl Center • Madison, Wisconsin	B1G+	Krivtsov	L 0–5	7,314	3–14–0
January 10	3:00 pm	at #3 Wisconsin*		Kohl Center • Madison, Wisconsin	B1G+	Krivtsov	L 2–3	9,578	3–15–0
January 16	7:07 pm	at Alaska*		Carlson Center • Fairbanks, Alaska (Governor's Cup)	FloHockey	Krivtsov	T 1–1 ^{OT}	2,343	3–15–1
January 17	7:07 pm	at Alaska*		Carlson Center • Fairbanks, Alaska (Governor's Cup)	FloHockey	Krivtsov	L 1–4	3,401	3–16–1
January 23	7:00 pm	Long Island*		Avis Alaska Sports Complex • Anchorage, Alaska		Krivtsov	L 2–6	771	3–17–1
January 24	5:00 pm	Long Island*		Avis Alaska Sports Complex • Anchorage, Alaska		Krivtsov	L 0–4	835	3–18–1
January 27	7:00 pm	Long Island*		Avis Alaska Sports Complex • Anchorage, Alaska		Orosz	L 3–4	273	3–19–1
February 6	7:00 pm	Alaska*		Sullivan Arena • Anchorage, Alaska (Governor's Cup)		Krivtsov	L 1–4	4,595	3–20–1
February 7	5:00 pm	Alaska*		Sullivan Arena • Anchorage, Alaska (Governor's Cup)		Krivtsov	W 3–2 ^{OT}	4,865	4–20–1
February 13	4:10 pm	at Lindenwood*		Centene Community Ice Center • St. Charles, Missouri		Krivtsov	W 5–4	936	5–20–1
February 14	3:10 pm	at Lindenwood*		Centene Community Ice Center • St. Charles, Missouri		Krivtsov	L 2–4	1,020	5–21–1
February 20	7:00 pm	Alaska*		Sullivan Arena • Anchorage, Alaska (Governor's Cup)		Krivtsov	L 3–4	3,035	5–22–1
February 21	5:00 pm	Alaska*		Sullivan Arena • Anchorage, Alaska (Governor's Cup)		Krivtsov	L 2–6	3,865	5–23–1
February 27	7:07 pm	at Alaska*		Carlson Center • Fairbanks, Alaska (Governor's Cup)	FloHockey	Krivtsov	L 0–2	2,032	5–24–1
February 28	7:07 pm	at Alaska*		Carlson Center • Fairbanks, Alaska (Governor's Cup)	FloHockey	Krivtsov	L 1–5	3,231	5–25–1
United Collegiate Hockey Cup
March 5	12:00 pm	vs. Stonehill*		Centene Community Ice Center • St. Charles, Missouri (UCHC Quarterfinal)	FloHockey	Krivtsov	L 0–3	232	5–26–1
March 6	4:00 pm	vs. Long Island*		Centene Community Ice Center • St. Charles, Missouri (UCHC Consolation Semifinal)	FloHockey	Marks	L 3–4 ^{OT}	486	5–27–1
*Non-conference game. ^{#}Rankings from USCHO.com Poll. All times are in Alaska Time. Source:

== Scoring statistics ==
Name	Position	Games	Goals	Assists	Points	PIM
Karter McNarland	F	33	4	17	21	6
Ryan Johnson	C	33	4	11	15	26
Tye Spencer	F	32	8	5	13	8
Joey Potter	D	32	4	6	10	37
Aiden Westin	F	33	8	1	9	14
Judah Makway	C	33	3	6	9	47
Dimitry Kebreau	F	19	2	7	9	2
Logan Acheson	D	33	1	8	9	4
Conor Cole	C	20	3	4	7	10
Oren Shtrom	F	32	3	4	7	35
Dylan Contreras	F	26	3	3	6	0
Jacob Terpstra	F	19	3	2	5	10
Camden Shasby	D	29	2	3	5	8
Aaron Reierson	RW	18	1	4	5	12
Adam Parsons	F	26	1	3	4	0
David Jesus	D	33	1	3	4	33
J. P. Steele	D	33	0	4	4	39
Ethan Warrener	D	28	3	0	3	12
Nolan Gagnon	D	18	0	3	3	4
Tanyon Bajzer	RW	22	0	3	3	0
Luke Johnson	C/LW	16	2	0	2	6
Pavol Funtek	D	18	0	2	2	4
Ben Anderson	F	13	1	0	1	23
Bryant Marks	G	6	0	1	1	0
Greg Orosz	G	4	0	0	0	0
Luke Helgeson	D	5	0	0	0	2
Brandon Lajoie	LW	6	0	0	0	0
Henry Bartle	F	7	0	0	0	6
Bryce Monrean	F	14	0	0	0	8
Tyler Krivtsov	G	26	0	0	0	2
Total			57	100	157	368

== Goaltending statistics ==
Name	Games	Minutes	Wins	Losses	Ties	Goals Against	Saves	Shut Outs	SV %	GAA
Tyler Krivtsov	27	1500:44	5	19	1	87	793	1	.901	3.48
Bryant Marks	6	304:52	0	5	0	23	156	0	.872	4.53
Greg Orosz	4	173:53	0	3	0	17	96	0	.850	5.87
Empty Net	-	18:10	-	-	-	7	-	-	-	-
Total	33	1997:39	5	27	1	134	1045	1	.886	4.02

== Rankings ==
Poll	Week																											
Poll	Pre	1	2	3	4	5	6	7	8	9	10	11	12	13	14	15	16	17	18	19	20	21	22	23	24	25	26	27 (Final)
USCHO.com	NR	NR	NR	NR	NR	NR	NR	NR	NR	NR	NR	NR	–	NR	NR	NR	NR	NR	NR	NR	NR	NR	NR	NR	NR	NR	NR	NR
USA Hockey	NR	NR	NR	NR	NR	NR	NR	NR	NR	NR	NR	NR	–	NR	NR	NR	NR	NR	NR	NR	NR	NR	NR	NR	NR	NR	NR	NR

Note: USCHO did not release a poll in week 12.
Note: USA Hockey did not release a poll in week 12.
