= 2024–25 Alaska Anchorage Seawolves men's ice hockey season =

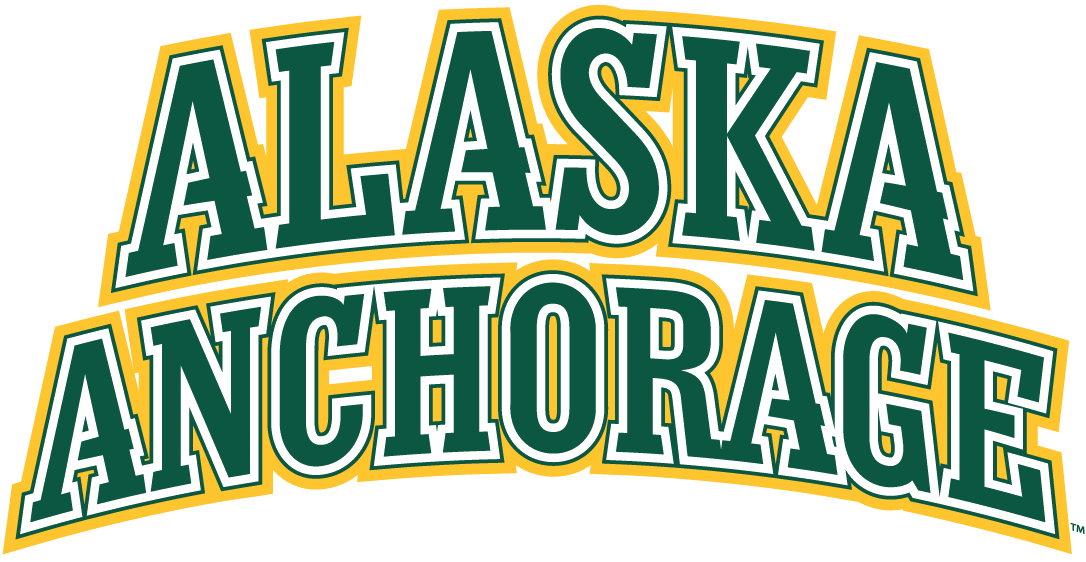
- Conference: Independent
- Home ice: Avis Alaska Sports Complex

Rankings
- USCHO: NR
- USA Hockey: NR

Record
- Overall: 6–23–5
- Home: 2–8–3
- Road: 4–14–2
- Neutral: 0–1–0

Coaches and captains
- Head coach: Matt Shasby
- Assistant coaches: Trevor Stewart; Aaron McPheters; Chris Kamal; Vincent Pietrangelo
- Captain: Connor Marritt
- Alternate captains: Maximilion Helgeson; Porter Schachle; Jarred White

The 2024–25 Alaska Anchorage Seawolves men's ice hockey season was the 44th season of play for the program and the 39th at the Division I level. The Seawolves represented the University of Alaska Anchorage, played their home games at the Avis Alaska Sports Complex and were coached by Matt Shasby in his 3rd season.

== Season ==
Hoping to build on a surprisingly good season in 2024, Alaska Anchorage would first have to overcome a great deal of roster turnover that saw more than half of the lineup leave. Greg Orosz took over as starter at the beginning of the year but his performance was a bit lackluster. Compounding the subpar goaltending was the team's very weak offense that saw the Seawolves score just 13 goals in their first 8 games. After a two week break at the beginning of November, Anchorage returned to the ice to face their long-time rival, Alaska. The Seawolves looked refreshed after the mini-vacation and pushed the Nanooks into overtime in the first match before exploding for a 6–1 win the following night.

The following week saw the offense decline back to its weak state before Orosz posted his worst performance of the season against Wisconsin. Freshman Tyler Krivtsov had played a few games previously but his 44-save effort against the Badgers that resulted in a 1–1 tie was enough to convince Matt Shasby to begin alternating between the two netminders. With the reduced workload, Orosz showed a bit of improvement in December. That, coupled with the offense beginning to show some consistency, brought about a good string of games from Alaska Anchorage before the winter break.

Kicking off the second half of their season with the Ledyard Bank Classic, Anchorage was already 8 games below .500 and had very little chance to make the NCAA tournament. They could, however, begin to make up for their poor start to the season. Unfortunately, the defense faltered when the team returned to play. Both Krivtsov and Orosz played poorly in the second half of the season, with the two allowing at least 4 goals in ten of the next fourteen games. Even with an increase in the team's offensive output, that left the Seawolves lagging far behind most of their contemporaries. With the team winning just one game during that stretch, they turned to their third-string goalie for the season finale. At that time, Bryant Marks had just 30 minutes of college experience but he used everything he had to post the only shutout of the season and end the campaign on a high note.

== Departures ==
Player	Position	Nationality	Cause
Matt Allen	Forward	United States	Graduation (signed with Tulsa Oilers)
Ben Almquist	Forward	United States	Graduation (signed with Lillehammer IK)
Brett Bamber	Defenseman	Canada	Transferred to American International
Carter Belitski	Defenseman	Canada	Transferred to Regina
Will Gilson	Defenseman	United States	Transferred to Renssealer
Caleb Huffman	Defenseman	United States	Transferred to Simon Fraser
Matt Kinash	Forward	Canada	Transferred to Toronto Metropolitan
Carson Kosobud	Defenseman	United States	Graduation (signed with Étoile Noire de Strasbourg)
Mitch LaFay	Forward	Canada	Transferred to Toronto Metropolitan
Joey Lamoreaux	Goaltender	United States	Graduation (retired)
Rowan Miller	Forward	United States	Signed professional contract (Åmåls SK)
Max Osborne	Defenseman	United States	Graduation (retired)
Riley Thompson	Forward	Canada	Transferred to Ohio State
Adam Tisdale	Goaltender	United States	Graduation (signed with Kalamazoo Wings)
Jared Whale	Forward	United States	Transferred to New Hampshire

== Recruiting ==
Player	Position	Nationality	Age	Notes
Logan Acheson	Defenseman	Canada	22	Edmonton, AB; transfer from Bemidji State
Dylan Contreras	Forward	United States	21	Yorba Linda, CA
Tanner Edwards	Forward	United States	24	Anchorage, AK; graduate transfer from Minnesota State
Pavol Funtek	Defenseman	Slovakia	21	Bratislava, SVK
Nolan Gagnon	Defenseman	Canada	21	Metcalfe, ON
Ryan Johnson	Forward	Canada	21	Calgary, AB
Dimitry Kebreau	Forward	United States	21	Silver Spring, MD
Tyler Krivtsov	Goaltender	United States	20	Santa Clarita, CA
Grady Logue	Forward	Canada	20	Stittsville, ON
Bryant Marks	Goaltender	United States	20	Wasilla, AK
Adam Parsons	Forward	Canada	20	Port Moody, BC
J. P. Steele	Defenseman	United States	20	Franklin, MI
Ethan Warrener	Defenseman	Canada	21	Calgary, AB

== Roster ==
As of July 30, 2024.

No.	Nat.	Player	Class	Pos	Height	Weight	DoB	Hometown	Previous team	NHL rights
2	(Canada)	Ethan Warrener	Freshman	D	6' 1" (1.85 m)	175 lb (79 kg)	2003-05-15	Calgary, Alberta	Trail Smoke Eaters (BCHL)	—
3	(United States)	Joey Potter	Sophomore	D	5' 11" (1.8 m)	185 lb (84 kg)	2003-05-09	Pittsburgh, Pennsylvania	Union (ECAC)	—
4	(United States)	Davis Goulker	Junior	D	6' 1" (1.85 m)	195 lb (88 kg)	2001-04-22	Atlanta, Georgia	Shreveport Mudbugs (NAHL)	—
5	(Slovakia)	Pavol Funtek	Freshman	D	6' 6" (1.98 m)	207 lb (94 kg)	2003-07-03	Bratislava, Slovakia	Minot Minotauros (NAHL)	—
6	(United States)	Brandon Lajoie	Junior	F	5' 11" (1.8 m)	180 lb (82 kg)	2001-10-18	Eagle River, Alaska	St. Cloud Norsemen (NAHL)	—
8	(United States)	Gunnar VanDamme	Sophomore	F	6' 0" (1.83 m)	182 lb (83 kg)	2002-12-08	Pittsford, New York	Maryland Black Bears (NAHL)	—
9	(Canada)	Conor Cole	Junior	F	5' 10" (1.78 m)	183 lb (83 kg)	2001-10-28	St. John's, Newfoundland and Labrador	Maryland Black Bears (NAHL)	—
10	(Canada)	Logan Acheson	Junior	D	5' 11" (1.8 m)	173 lb (78 kg)	2002-04-24	Edmonton, Alberta	Bemidji State (CCHA)	—
11	(United States)	Dylan Contreras	Freshman	F	5' 7" (1.7 m)	165 lb (75 kg)	2003-05-23	Yorba Linda, California	Kenai River Brown Bears (NAHL)	—
12	(United States)	J. P. Steele	Freshman	D	6' 2" (1.88 m)	185 lb (84 kg)	2003-10-08	Franklin, Michigan	Maine Nordiques (NAHL)	—
14	(Canada)	Connor Marritt (C)	Graduate	F	6' 1" (1.85 m)	174 lb (79 kg)	1999-03-14	Kelowna, British Columbia	Northern Michigan (CCHA)	—
16	(Canada)	Ryan Johnson	Freshman	F	5' 10" (1.78 m)	181 lb (82 kg)	2003-05-05	Calgary, Alberta	New Mexico Ice Wolves (NAHL)	—
19	(Canada)	Nolan Gagnon	Freshman	D	5' 10" (1.78 m)	165 lb (75 kg)	2003-04-18	Metcalfe, Ontario	Amarillo Wranglers (NAHL)	—
20	(Canada)	Adam Parsons	Freshman	F	6' 0" (1.83 m)	170 lb (77 kg)	2003-10-22	Port Moody, British Columbia	Trail Smoke Eaters (BCHL)	—
21	(United States)	Ben Anderson	Sophomore	F	6' 5" (1.96 m)	210 lb (95 kg)	2002-03-01	Crystal, Minnesota	Wisconsin Windigo (NAHL)	—
22	(United States)	Aiden Westin	Sophomore	F	6' 1" (1.85 m)	185 lb (84 kg)	2002-02-06	Anchorage, Alaska	Anchorage Wolverines (NAHL)	—
23	(United States)	Maximilion Helgeson (A)	Senior	F	6' 1" (1.85 m)	185 lb (84 kg)	2000-12-05	Anchorage, Alaska	Lindenwood (ACHA)	—
25	(United States)	Will Schimek	Graduate	D	6' 2" (1.88 m)	200 lb (91 kg)	2001-05-22	Mendota Heights, Minnesota	Providence (USHL)	—
26	(Canada)	Dylan Finlay	Junior	D	6' 1" (1.85 m)	178 lb (81 kg)	2001-10-24	L'Île-Bizard, Quebec	Powell River Kings (BCHL)	—
27	(United States)	Dimitry Kebreau	Freshman	F	5' 10" (1.78 m)	181 lb (82 kg)	2003-06-16	Silver Spring, Maryland	Maryland Black Bears (NAHL)	—
28	(Canada)	Matt Johnson	Junior	F	6' 1" (1.85 m)	195 lb (88 kg)	2001-11-25	Calgary, Alberta	Anchorage Wolverines (NAHL)	—
30	(United States)	Tyler Krivtsov	Freshman	G	6' 2" (1.88 m)	190 lb (86 kg)	2003-12-02	Santa Clarita, California	Fairbanks Ice Dogs (AJHL)	—
31	(United States)	Bryant Marks	Freshman	G	6' 0" (1.83 m)	174 lb (79 kg)	2004-03-12	Wasilla, Alaska	Kenai River Brown Bears (NAHL)	—
33	(Hungary)	Greg Orosz	Sophomore	G	6' 3" (1.91 m)	190 lb (86 kg)	2002-08-28	Győr, Hungary	Odessa Jackalopes (NAHL)	—
39	(United States)	Tanner Edwards	Graduate	F	6' 1" (1.85 m)	170 lb (77 kg)	2000-03-11	Anchorage, Alaska	Minnesota State (CCHA)	—
43	(Canada)	Karter McNarland	Sophomore	F	5' 11" (1.8 m)	170 lb (77 kg)	2003-02-10	Saskatoon, Saskatchewan	Powell River Kings (BCHL)	—
74	(United States)	Alex Gomez	Junior	F	6' 4" (1.93 m)	185 lb (84 kg)	2001-07-18	Parker, Colorado	New Mexico Ice Wolves (NAHL)	—
79	(United States)	Porter Schachle (A)	Senior	F	6' 4" (1.93 m)	194 lb (88 kg)	2000-11-22	Wasilla, Alaska	Danbury Jr. Hat Tricks (NAHL)	—
86	(United States)	Jarred White (A)	Graduate	F	5' 10" (1.78 m)	195 lb (88 kg)	1999-05-21	Edmonton, Alberta	Western Michigan (NCHC)	—

== Standings ==
2024–25 NCAA Division I Independent ice hockey standings
	Overall record					
	GP	W	L	T	GF	GA
Alaska	32	12	14	6	73	87
Alaska Anchorage	34	6	23	5	75	117
Lindenwood	32	8	22	2	65	86
Long Island	34	20	12	2	111	77
Stonehill	34	12	22	0	76	106
Rankings: USCHO.com Top 20 Poll

== Schedule and results ==
Date	Time	Opponent^{#}	Rank^{#}	Site	TV	Decision	Result	Attendance	Record
Exhibition
September 27	7:00 pm	Grand Canyon*		Avis Alaska Sports Complex • Anchorage, Alaska (Exhibition)		Orosz	W 7–1	750	
Regular Season
October 5	6:07 pm	#1 Denver*		Avis Alaska Sports Complex • Anchorage, Alaska		Orosz	L 2–6	710	0–1–0
October 6	5:07 pm	#1 Denver*		Avis Alaska Sports Complex • Anchorage, Alaska		Orosz	L 1–4	659	0–2–0
October 11	3:05 pm	at Miami*		Steve Cady Arena • Oxford, Ohio		Orosz	L 2–3	1,621	0–3–0
October 12	3:05 pm	at Miami*		Steve Cady Arena • Oxford, Ohio		Orosz	L 1–4	1,589	0–4–0
October 18	3:07 pm	at Northern Michigan*		Berry Events Center • Marquette, Michigan	Midco Sports+	Krivtsov	L 1–2	2,916	0–5–0
October 19	2:07 pm	at Northern Michigan*		Berry Events Center • Marquette, Michigan	Midco Sports+	Orosz	W 5–3	2,762	1–5–0
October 25	7:07 pm	#9 Colorado College*		Avis Alaska Sports Complex • Anchorage, Alaska		Orosz	L 1–2	601	1–6–0
October 26	6:07 pm	#9 Colorado College*		Avis Alaska Sports Complex • Anchorage, Alaska		Orosz	L 0–2	577	1–7–0
November 15	7:07 pm	Alaska*		Avis Alaska Sports Complex • Anchorage, Alaska (Governor's Cup)		Orosz	L 2–3 ^{OT}	675	1–8–0
November 16	5:07 pm	Alaska*		Avis Alaska Sports Complex • Anchorage, Alaska (Governor's Cup)		Orosz	W 6–1	712	2–8–0
November 23	6:07 pm	Lake Superior State*		Avis Alaska Sports Complex • Anchorage, Alaska		Orosz	T 4–4 ^{OT}	636	2–8–1
November 24	5:07 pm	Lake Superior State*		Avis Alaska Sports Complex • Anchorage, Alaska		Krivtsov	L 2–4	666	2–9–1
November 29	4:00 pm	at Wisconsin*		Kohl Center • Madison, Wisconsin		Orosz	L 1–7	8,904	2–10–1
November 30	5:00 pm	at Wisconsin*		Kohl Center • Madison, Wisconsin		Krivtsov	T 1–1 ^{OT}	9,505	2–10–2
December 4	3:00 pm	at Stonehill*		Bridgewater Ice Arena • Bridgewater, Massachusetts	NEC Front Row	Orosz	W 4–1	143	3–10–2
December 6	3:00 pm	at Merrimack*		J. Thom Lawler Rink • North Andover, Massachusetts	ESPN+	Krivtsov	L 2–4	1,754	3–11–2
December 7	3:00 pm	at Merrimack*		J. Thom Lawler Rink • North Andover, Massachusetts	ESPN+	Orosz	W 3–1	1,833	4–11–2
December 12	7:07 pm	Augustana*		Avis Alaska Sports Complex • Anchorage, Alaska		Orosz	T 2–2 ^{OT}	507	4–11–3
December 13	7:07 pm	Augustana*		Avis Alaska Sports Complex • Anchorage, Alaska		Krivtsov	L 2–3 ^{OT}	613	4–12–3
Ledyard Bank Classic
December 28	3:30 pm	at #17 Dartmouth*		Thompson Arena • Hanover, New Hampshire (Ledyard Bank Semifinal)	ESPN+	Orosz	L 4–5	3,582	4–13–3
December 29	12:00 pm	vs. Northeastern*		Thompson Arena • Hanover, New Hampshire (Ledyard Bank Consolation Game)	ESPN+	Krivtsov	L 3–4 ^{OT}	2,436	4–14–3
January 3	3:00 pm	at #4 Western Michigan*		Lawson Arena • Kalamazoo, Michigan		Krivtsov	L 1–4	2,654	4–15–3
January 4	2:00 pm	at #4 Western Michigan*		Lawson Arena • Kalamazoo, Michigan		Krivtsov	L 2–5	3,033	4–16–3
January 10	2:00 pm	at Niagara*		Dwyer Arena • Lewiston, New York	FloHockey	Orosz	L 2–6	487	4–17–3
January 11	3:00 pm	at Niagara*		Dwyer Arena • Lewiston, New York	FloHockey	Krivtsov	W 3–1	594	5–17–3
January 18	7:07 pm	Alaska*		Avis Alaska Sports Complex • Anchorage, Alaska		Krivtsov	T 3–3 ^{OT}	715	5–17–4
January 31	7:07 pm	at Alaska*		Carlson Center • Fairbanks, Alaska (Governor's Cup)	FloHockey	Krivtsov	L 1–3	2,466	5–18–4
February 1	7:07 pm	at Alaska*		Carlson Center • Fairbanks, Alaska (Governor's Cup)	FloHockey	Orosz	L 1–5	3,180	5–19–4
February 8	5:07 pm	at Alaska*		Carlson Center • Fairbanks, Alaska (Governor's Cup)	FloHockey	Krivtsov	T 3–3	3,375	5–19–5
February 12	3:00 pm	at #11 Connecticut*		Toscano Family Ice Forum • Storrs, Connecticut	ESPN+	Krivtsov	L 2–5	2,292	5–20–5
February 14	10:00 am	at Long Island*		Northwell Health Ice Center • East Meadow, New York	ESPN+	Orosz	L 1–6	203	5–21–5
February 15	10:00 am	at Long Island*		Northwell Health Ice Center • East Meadow, New York	ESPN+	Krivtsov	L 2–4	300	5–22–5
February 21	7:07 pm	Lindenwood*		Avis Alaska Sports Complex • Anchorage, Alaska		Krivtsov	L 4–6	669	5–23–5
February 22	7:07 pm	Lindenwood*		Avis Alaska Sports Complex • Anchorage, Alaska		Marks	W 1–0	533	6–23–5
*Non-conference game. ^{#}Rankings from USCHO.com Poll. All times are in Alaska Time. Source:

== Scoring statistics ==
Name	Position	Games	Goals	Assists	Points	PIM
Ryan Johnson	C	33	11	14	25	6
Dimitry Kebreau	F	31	8	15	23	15
Max Helgeson	F	34	8	11	19	16
Conor Cole	C	28	4	13	17	12
Dylan Contreras	F	29	8	4	12	6
Dylan Finlay	D	28	4	6	10	8
Matt Johnson	F	26	4	5	9	10
Tanner Edwards	C/LW	31	3	5	8	58
Jarred White	LW	32	3	5	8	17
Karter McNarland	F	23	2	4	6	4
Gunnar VanDamme	D	34	2	4	6	12
Logan Acheson	D	27	1	5	6	4
Porter Schachle	F	21	4	1	5	20
Joey Potter	D	18	2	3	5	12
Aiden Westin	F	27	2	3	5	6
Alex Gomez	C/W	16	0	5	5	2
Connor Marritt	F	28	2	2	4	4
Adam Parsons	F	21	1	2	3	2
Ben Anderson	F	21	1	2	3	41
Davis Goukler	D	22	1	2	3	4
Will Schimek	D	32	1	2	3	27
Brandon Lajoie	LW	11	1	1	2	0
Pavol Funtek	D	17	1	1	2	6
Ethan Warrener	D	18	1	1	2	6
J. P. Steele	D	17	0	2	2	12
Nolan Gagnon	D	20	0	2	2	4
Greg Orosz	G	20	0	0	0	0
Tyler Krivtsov	G	18	0	0	0	0
Bryant Marks	G	3	0	0	0	0
Total			75	120	195	322

== Goaltending statistics ==
Name	Games	Minutes	Wins	Losses	Ties	Goals Against	Saves	Shut Outs	SV %	GAA
Bryant Marks	3	90:16	1	0	0	2	32	1	.941	1.33
Tyler Krivtsov	19	941:52	1	11	3	49	405	0	.892	3.12
Greg Orosz	21	1002:53	4	12	2	60	422	0	.876	3.59
Empty Net	-	35:09	-	-	-	6	-	-	-	-
Total	34	2070:10	6	23	5	117	859	1	.880	3.39

== Rankings ==
Poll	Week																											
Poll	Pre	1	2	3	4	5	6	7	8	9	10	11	12	13	14	15	16	17	18	19	20	21	22	23	24	25	26	27 (Final)
USCHO.com	NR	NR	NR	NR	NR	NR	NR	NR	NR	NR	NR	NR	–	NR	NR	NR	NR	NR	NR	NR	NR	NR	NR	NR	NR	NR	–	NR
USA Hockey	NR	NR	NR	NR	NR	NR	NR	NR	NR	NR	NR	NR	–	NR	NR	NR	NR	NR	NR	NR	NR	NR	NR	NR	NR	NR	NR	NR

Note: USCHO did not release a poll in week 12 or 26.
Note: USA Hockey did not release a poll in week 12.
