= 2023–24 Alaska Anchorage Seawolves men's ice hockey season =

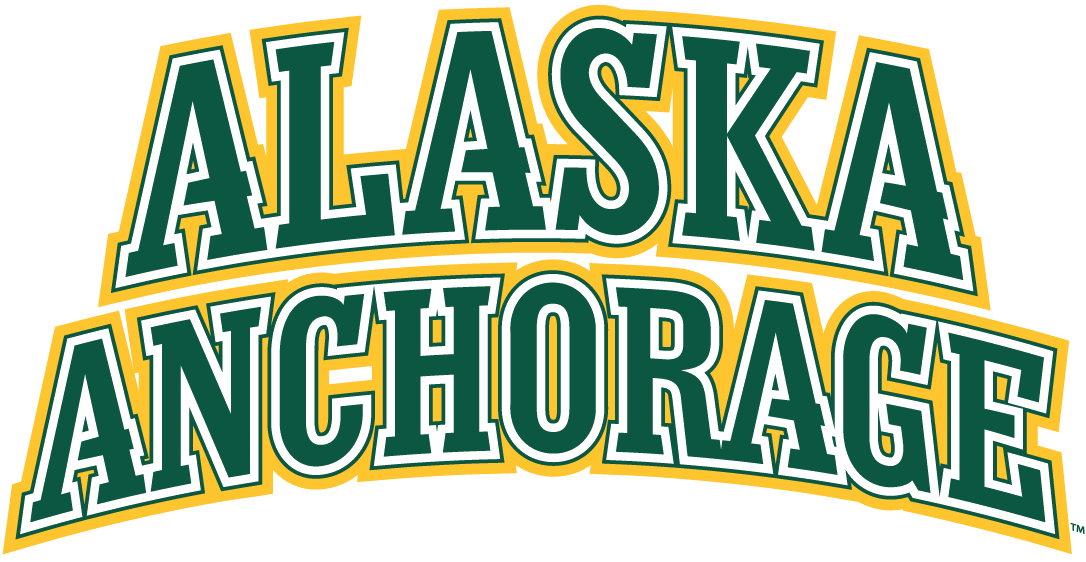
- Conference: Independent
- Home ice: Avis Alaska Sports Complex

Rankings
- USCHO: NR
- USA Hockey: NR

Record
- Overall: 15–17–2
- Home: 8–6–1
- Road: 7–11–1

Coaches and captains
- Head coach: Matt Shasby
- Assistant coaches: Trevor Stewart; Aaron McPheters
- Captain: Connor Marritt

The 2023–24 Alaska Anchorage Seawolves men's ice hockey season was the 43rd season of play for the program and the 38th at the Division I level. The Seawolves represented the University of Alaska Anchorage, played their home games at the Avis Alaska Sports Complex and were coached by Matt Shasby in his 2nd season.

== Season ==
Returning with largely the same lineup as the year before, Alaska Anchorage got off to a decent start and were able to play even hockey over the first month of the season. The Seawolves ended with a win over a ranked Penn State squad as well as a vast improvement in play from all quarters. In their first three losses, the team fell by just a single goal which helped lift the team into the middle of the national rankings. Unfortunately, UAA was unable to sustain that level of play and the team suffered through a raft of poor goaltending and uninspired offense in the middle of the season. During that stretch the team won just 2 out of 12 games but, thanks to a 41-save performance from Jared Whale, the Seawolves managed to take down one of the best teams in the country, Wisconsin.

When Anchorage began the second half its season after Christmas, the team had no real chance of making the postseason, however, they still had something to play for. The Seawolves began with a tie against Alaska, ending a 12-game losing streak to their long-time rival. The following week the team travelled to Rhode Island and earned a split with #9 Providence. The surprising victory kicked off a long stretch of winning hockey that saw the team play far better on both sides of the puck. The Seawolves finished out the year with a split against Arizona State, earning their fourth win over a ranked opponent on the season. Anchorage ended the year just shy of a .500 record but team had improved by leaps and bounds.

== Departures ==
Player	Position	Nationality	Cause
Jamie Collins	Forward	Canada	Graduation (signed with Comètes de Meudon)
Jimmy Darby	Defenseman	Canada	Transferred to Simon Frazer
Dorian Dawson	Defenseman	Canada	Graduation (retired)
Derek Hamelin	Defenseman	Canada	Graduation (signed with Remparts de Tours)
Caleb Hite	Forward	United States	Graduation (retired)
Nolan Kent	Goaltender	Canada	Graduation (signed with Coventry Blaze)

== Recruiting ==
Player	Position	Nationality	Age	Notes
Ben Anderson	Forward	United States	21	Crystal, MN
Mitch LaFay	Forward	Canada	21	Stratford, ON
Karter McNarland	Forward	Canada	20	Saskatoon, SK
Greg Orosz	Goaltender	Hungary	21	Győr, HUN
Porter Schachle	Forward	United States	22	Wasilla, AK; transfer from Vermont
Riley Thompson	Forward	Canada	21	Orleans, ON
Gunnar VanDamme	Defenseman	United States	20	Pittsford, NY
Aiden Westin	Forward	United States	21	Anchorage, AK

== Roster ==
As of September 20, 2023.

No.	Nat.	Player	Class	Pos	Height	Weight	DoB	Hometown	Previous team	NHL rights
2	(United States)	Max Osborne	Senior	D	5' 10" (1.78 m)	175 lb (79 kg)	1999-02-01	Anchorage, Alaska	Saint John's (MIAC)	—
4	(United States)	Davis Goulker	Sophomore	D	6' 1" (1.85 m)	195 lb (88 kg)	2001-04-22	Atlanta, Georgia	Shreveport (NAHL)	—
6	(United States)	Brandon Lajoie	Sophomore	F	5' 11" (1.8 m)	180 lb (82 kg)	2001-10-18	Eagle River, Alaska	St. Cloud (NAHL)	—
7	(United States)	Carson Kosobud	Junior	D	6' 0" (1.83 m)	186 lb (84 kg)	1999-06-04	Moorhead, Minnesota	Arizona State (NCAA)	—
8	(United States)	William Gilson	Sophomore	D	6' 0" (1.83 m)	170 lb (77 kg)	2001-06-28	Old Greenwich, Connecticut	Aberdeen (NAHL)	—
9	(Canada)	Conor Cole	Sophomore	F	5' 10" (1.78 m)	183 lb (83 kg)	2001-10-28	St. John's, Newfoundland and Labrador	Maryland (NAHL)	—
10	(Canada)	Riley Thompson	Sophomore	F	6' 3" (1.91 m)	190 lb (86 kg)	2002-08-17	Orleans, Ontario	Smiths Falls (CCHL)	—
11	(United States)	Ben Almquist	Senior	F	6' 0" (1.83 m)	175 lb (79 kg)	1999-10-01	Victoria, Minnesota	Minnesota Duluth (NCHC)	—
12	(Canada)	Mitch Lafay	Freshman	F	6' 6" (1.98 m)	215 lb (98 kg)	2002-08-06	Stratford, Ontario	Trenton (OJHL)	—
13	(Canada)	Matt Kinash	Junior	F	6' 0" (1.83 m)	185 lb (84 kg)	1999-12-15	Edmonton, Alberta	UMass Lowell (HEA)	—
14	(Canada)	Connor Marritt (C)	Senior	F	6' 1" (1.85 m)	174 lb (79 kg)	1999-03-14	Kelowna, British Columbia	Northern Michigan (CCHA)	—
17	(United States)	Gunnar VanDamme	Freshman	F	6' 0" (1.83 m)	182 lb (83 kg)	2002-12-08	Pittsford, New York	Maryland (NAHL)	—
19	(United States)	Rowan Miller	Sophomore	F	5' 11" (1.8 m)	160 lb (73 kg)	2001-10-07	Phoenix, Arizona	Prince George (BCHL)	—
20	(United States)	Matt Allen	Senior	F	5' 10" (1.78 m)	168 lb (76 kg)	2000-05-13	Minco, Oklahoma	UMass Lowell (HEA)	—
21	(United States)	Ben Anderson	Freshman	F	6' 5" (1.96 m)	210 lb (95 kg)	2002-03-01	Crystal, Minnesota	Wisconsin (NAHL)	—
22	(United States)	Aiden Westin	Freshman	F	6' 1" (1.85 m)	185 lb (84 kg)	2002-02-06	Anchorage, Alaska	Anchorage (NAHL)	—
23	(United States)	Maximilion Helgeson	Junior	F	6' 1" (1.85 m)	185 lb (84 kg)	2000-12-05	Anchorage, Alaska	Lindenwood (ACHA)	—
25	(United States)	Caleb Huffman	Sophomore	D	6' 4" (1.93 m)	201 lb (91 kg)	2002-01-31	Fairbanks, Alaska	Kenai River (NAHL)	—
26	(Canada)	Dylan Finlay	Sophomore	D	6' 1" (1.85 m)	178 lb (81 kg)	2001-10-24	L'Île-Bizard, Quebec	Powell River (BCHL)	—
28	(Canada)	Matt Johnson	Sophomore	F	6' 1" (1.85 m)	195 lb (88 kg)	2001-11-25	Calgary, Alberta	Anchorage (NAHL)	—
29	(Canada)	Adam Tisdale	Graduate	F	5' 9" (1.75 m)	171 lb (78 kg)	1998-11-09	Cochrane, Alberta	Sacred Heart (AHA)	—
30	(Canada)	Jared Whale	Sophomore	G	5' 11" (1.8 m)	195 lb (88 kg)	2002-11-01	Calgary, Alberta	Olds (AJHL)	—
32	(United States)	Joey Lamoreaux	Graduate	G	6' 1" (1.85 m)	183 lb (83 kg)	1999-02-01	Shorewood, Wisconsin	St. Cloud State (NCHC)	—
33	(Hungary)	Greg Orosz	Freshman	G	6' 3" (1.91 m)	190 lb (86 kg)	2002-08-28	Győr, Hungary	Odessa (NAHL)	—
37	(Canada)	Carter Belitski	Sophomore	F	6' 1" (1.85 m)	180 lb (82 kg)	2001-01-13	Regina, Saskatchewan	Drumheller (AJHL)	—
43	(Canada)	Karter McNarland	Freshman	F	5' 11" (1.8 m)	170 lb (77 kg)	2003-02-10	Saskatoon, Saskatchewan	Powell River (BCHL)	—
74	(United States)	Alex Gomez	Sophomore	F	6' 4" (1.93 m)	185 lb (84 kg)	2001-07-18	Parker, Colorado	New Mexico (NAHL)	—
77	(Canada)	Brett Bamber	Sophomore	D	5' 9" (1.75 m)	175 lb (79 kg)	2001-11-07	St. Albert, Alberta	Drayton Valley (AJHL)	—
79	(United States)	Porter Schachle	Junior	F	6' 4" (1.93 m)	194 lb (88 kg)	2000-11-22	Wasilla, Alaska	Danbury (NAHL)	—
86	(Canada)	Jarred White	Senior	F	5' 10" (1.78 m)	195 lb (88 kg)	1999-05-21	Edmonton, Alberta	Western Michigan (NCHC)	—

== Standings ==
2023–24 NCAA Division I Independent ice hockey standings
	Overall record					
	GP	W	L	T	GF	GA
Alaska	34	17	14	3	110	86
Alaska Anchorage	34	15	17	2	95	105
Arizona State	38	24	8	6	129	94
Lindenwood	28	6	18	4	74	121
Long Island	37	16	20	1	115	103
Stonehill	36	2	34	0	62	213
Rankings: USCHO.com Top 20 Poll

== Schedule and results ==
Date	Time	Opponent^{#}	Rank^{#}	Site	TV	Decision	Result	Attendance	Record
Exhibition
September 29	7:07 pm	Vancouver Island*		Avis Alaska Sports Complex • Anchorage, Alaska (Exhibition)		Whale	W 7–2		
Regular Season
October 7	4:07 pm	Massachusetts Lowell*		Avis Alaska Sports Complex • Anchorage, Alaska		Whale	W 3–2 ^{OT}	750	1–0–0
October 8	4:07 pm	Massachusetts Lowell*		Avis Alaska Sports Complex • Anchorage, Alaska		Whale	L 1–2	650	1–1–0
October 13	3:07 pm	at Lake Superior State*		Taffy Abel Arena • Sault Ste. Marie, Michigan	FloHockey	Lamoreaux	L 1–5	1,429	1–2–0
October 14	2:07 pm	at Lake Superior State*		Taffy Abel Arena • Sault Ste. Marie, Michigan	FloHockey	Whale	W 3–2	1,589	2–2–0
October 20	7:07 pm	Air Force*		Avis Alaska Sports Complex • Anchorage, Alaska		Whale	W 3–1	874	3–2–0
October 21	6:07 pm	Air Force*		Avis Alaska Sports Complex • Anchorage, Alaska		Whale	L 3–4	715	3–3–0
October 26	3:00 pm	at #15 Penn State*		Pegula Ice Arena • University Park, Pennsylvania		Whale	L 1–2	6,127	3–4–0
October 27	3:00 pm	at #15 Penn State*		Pegula Ice Arena • University Park, Pennsylvania		Orosz	W 6–5	6,365	4–4–0
November 3	7:07 pm	at Alaska*		Carlson Center • Fairbanks, Alaska (Governor's Cup)	FloHockey	Whale	L 1–6	3,112	4–5–0
November 4	7:07 pm	at Alaska*		Carlson Center • Fairbanks, Alaska (Governor's Cup)	FloHockey	Lamoreaux	L 4–5	4,086	4–6–0
November 10	7:07 pm	Robert Morris*		Avis Alaska Sports Complex • Anchorage, Alaska		Whale	W 3–2	700	5–6–0
November 11	6:07 pm	Robert Morris*		Avis Alaska Sports Complex • Anchorage, Alaska		Whale	T 2–2 ^{OT}	506	5–6–1
November 17	5:00 pm	at #14 Arizona State*		Mullett Arena • Tempe, Arizona		Whale	L 3–4	4,774	5–7–1
November 19	11:00 am	at #14 Arizona State*		Mullett Arena • Tempe, Arizona		Orosz	L 0–3	4,632	5–8–1
November 24	4:00 pm	at #6 Wisconsin*		Kohl Center • Madison, Wisconsin	BTN+	Whale	W 1–0	8,496	6–8–1
November 25	3:00 pm	at #6 Wisconsin*		Kohl Center • Madison, Wisconsin	BTN+	Lamoreaux	L 0–5	8,755	6–9–1
December 1	7:07 pm	Alaska*		Avis Alaska Sports Complex • Anchorage, Alaska (Governor's Cup)		Whale	L 0–5	951	6–10–1
December 2	6:07 pm	Alaska*		Avis Alaska Sports Complex • Anchorage, Alaska (Governor's Cup)		Whale	L 1–3	966	6–11–1
December 8	3:00 pm	at #11 Massachusetts*		Mullins Center • Amherst, Massachusetts	ESPN+	Whale	L 2–11	4,410	6–12–1
December 9	3:00 pm	at #11 Massachusetts*		Mullins Center • Amherst, Massachusetts	ESPN+	Whale	L 2–3	3,685	6–13–1
January 13	7:07 pm	at Alaska*		Carlson Center • Fairbanks, Alaska (Governor's Cup)	FloHockey	Orosz	T 2–2 ^{OT}	3,013	6–13–2
January 19	3:00 pm	at #9 Providence*		Schneider Arena • Providence, Rhode Island	ESPN+	Whale	L 0–2	2,365	6–14–2
January 20	3:00 pm	at #9 Providence*		Schneider Arena • Providence, Rhode Island	ESPN+	Whale	W 4–0	2,415	7–14–2
February 3	5:07 pm	Alaska*		Avis Alaska Sports Complex • Anchorage, Alaska (Governor's Cup)		Whale	W 4–2	712	8–14–2
February 10	6:07 pm	Long Island*		Avis Alaska Sports Complex • Anchorage, Alaska		Whale	L 1–2	800	8–15–2
February 11	5:07 pm	Long Island*		Avis Alaska Sports Complex • Anchorage, Alaska		Orosz	W 3–1	562	9–15–2
February 16	4:10 pm	at Lindenwood*		Centene Community Ice Center • St. Charles, Missouri		Whale	W 5–3	919	10–15–2
February 17	3:00 pm	at Lindenwood*		Centene Community Ice Center • St. Charles, Missouri		Orosz	W 3–0	1,012	11–15–2
February 23	4:07 pm	at Augustana*		Midco Arena • Sioux Falls, South Dakota	FloHockey, Midco	Lamoreaux	W 6–5	2,371	12–15–2
February 24	3:07 pm	at Augustana*		Midco Arena • Sioux Falls, South Dakota	FloHockey, Midco	Whale	L 0–3	2,718	12–16–2
March 1	7:07 pm	Stonehill*		Avis Alaska Sports Complex • Anchorage, Alaska		Whale	W 9–3	680	13–16–2
March 2	3:07 pm	Stonehill*		Avis Alaska Sports Complex • Anchorage, Alaska		Lamoreaux	W 12–2	580	14–16–2
March 8	7:07 pm	#20 Arizona State*		Avis Alaska Sports Complex • Anchorage, Alaska		Whale	W 4–3	870	15–16–2
March 9	5:07 pm	#20 Arizona State*		Avis Alaska Sports Complex • Anchorage, Alaska		Lamoreaux	L 2–5	909	15–17–2
*Non-conference game. ^{#}Rankings from USCHO.com Poll. All times are in Alaska Time. Source:

== Scoring statistics ==
Name	Position	Games	Goals	Assists	Points	PIM
Ben Almquist	F	34	14	16	30	14
Maximilion Helgeson	F	33	14	13	27	31
Riley Thompson	F	34	9	15	24	32
Porter Schachle	F	32	8	8	16	41
Aiden Westin	F	29	7	9	16	17
William Gilson	D	34	3	12	15	67
Connor Marritt	F	33	7	7	14	7
Adam Tisdale	F	34	5	8	13	4
Matt Allen	F	30	6	7	13	4
Brett Bamber	D	34	4	9	13	17
Gunnar VanDamme	D	34	3	7	10	29
Matt Johnson	F	14	6	3	9	2
Karter McNarland	F	16	3	5	8	6
Carson Kosobud	D	33	1	7	8	33
Jarred White	LW	24	0	6	6	12
Matt Kinash	D	18	2	4	6	6
Alex Gomez	C/W	23	1	3	4	6
Brandon Lajoie	LW	7	0	4	4	2
Conor Cole	C	20	0	3	3	14
Davis Goukler	D	24	1	2	3	6
Joey Lamoreaux	G	9	0	2	2	2
Dylan Finlay	D	23	1	1	2	4
Rowan Miller	F	10	0	1	1	4
Carter Belitski	D	14	0	1	1	2
Max Osborne	D	11	0	1	1	4
Caleb Huffman	D	30	0	1	1	57
Ben Anderson	G	11	0	1	1	14
Jared Whale	G	25	0	0	0	0
Greg Orosz	D	8	0	0	0	0
Mitch Lafay	D	1	0	0	0	0
Total			95	156	251	437

== Goaltending statistics ==
Name	Games	Minutes	Wins	Losses	Ties	Goals against	Saves	Shut outs	SV %	GAA
Jared Whale	27	1346:05	10	12	1	60	600	2	.909	2.67
Greg Orosz	12	392:11	3	1	1	18	195	1	.915	2.75
Joey Lamoreaux	13	299:38	2	4	0	23	124	0	.844	4.61
Empty Net	-	21:45	-	-	-	4	-	-	-	-
Total	34	2059:39	15	17	2	105	919	3	.897	3.06

== Rankings ==
Poll	Week																										
Poll	Pre	1	2	3	4	5	6	7	8	9	10	11	12	13	14	15	16	17	18	19	20	21	22	23	24	25	26 (Final)
USCHO.com	NR	NR	NR	NR	NR	NR	NR	NR	NR	NR	NR	–	NR	NR	NR	NR	NR	NR	NR	NR	NR	NR	NR	NR	NR	–	NR
USA Hockey	NR	NR	NR	NR	NR	NR	NR	NR	NR	NR	NR	NR	–	NR	NR	NR	NR	NR	NR	NR	NR	NR	NR	NR	NR	NR	NR

Note: USCHO did not release a poll in weeks 11 and 25.
Note: USA Hockey did not release a poll in week 12.
