= 2024–25 Alaska Nanooks men's ice hockey season =

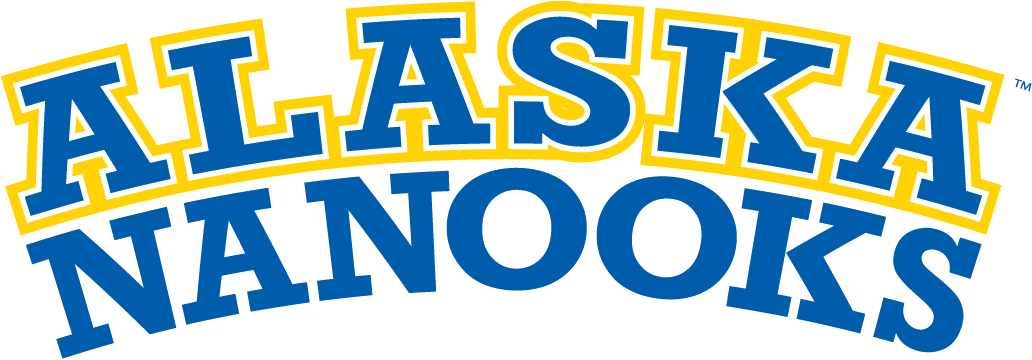
- Conference: Independent
- Home ice: Carlson Center

Rankings
- USCHO: NR
- USA Hockey: NR

Record
- Overall: 12–14–6
- Home: 3–3–1
- Road: 8–10–5
- Neutral: 1–1–0

Coaches and captains
- Head coach: Erik Largen
- Assistant coaches: Chris Brown; P. D. Melgoza; Casey Mignone
- Captain: Braden Birnie
- Alternate captain(s): Chase Dafoe; Kyle Gaffney; Matt Koethe; Brayden Nicholetts

The 2024–25 Alaska Nanooks men's ice hockey season was the 75th season of play for the program and 40th at the Division I level. The Nanooks represented the University of Alaska Fairbanks, played their games at the Carlson Center and were coached by Erik Largen in his 6th season.

== Season ==
As the Nanooks entered the season, the team's biggest task was integrating the new players into the system. With more than half of the roster changing in the offseason, coach Largen had his work cut out for him. That fact was illustrated in Alaska stumbling out of the gate. After a decent performance in a loss for the season opener, the offense bottomed out and could barely score for the rest of October. It was only through a solid defensive effort that the team was able to end its losing streak with a shutout but the season had already been dealt a blow. In November the forwards morphed itself into a credible unit and the team began to crawl back towards .500 but a few subpar games in goal kept the team on the losing side of the ledger.

When Alaska began the second half of its season at the Holiday Face–Off, the team was mired in the bottom half of the PairWise rankings and had almost no shot at a tournament bid. However, after Nicholas Grabko's play had slumped before the break, the team began to rotate the starting position between him and Lassi Lehti. The move appeared to pay dividends as the team went on a solid run from late December to late February, going 6–3–3 over the span.

After finally getting back to even, the Nanooks finished off their fairly disappointing season with a sweep at the hands of Long Island. Due in part to their limited schedule of 32 games, the lowest number Alaska had managed to play in 35 years, the Nanooks were only able to win 12 games throughout the season, tying the lowest total for the team under Largen.

== Departures ==
| Player | Position | Nationality | Cause |
|---|---|---|---|
| Arvils Bergmanis | Defenseman | Latvia | Transferred to Rensselaer |
| Edvards Bergmanis | Forward | Latvia | Signed professional contract (Herning IK II) |
| Dawson Bruneski | Defenseman | Canada | Graduation (retired) |
| Pierce Charleson | Goaltender | Canada | Graduate transfer to Niagara |
| Chase Dubois | Forward | Canada | Graduation (signed with Diables Rouges de Briançon) |
| William Hambley | Goaltender | Canada | Transferred to Brock |
| Harrison Israels | Forward | Canada | Graduate transfer to Omaha |
| Xavier Jean-Louis | Defenseman | United States | Transferred to Ferris State |
| T. J. Lloyd | Defenseman | Canada | Graduation (signed with Savannah Ghost Pirates) |
| A. J. Macaulay | Defenseman | Canada | Transferred to Bemidji State |
| Caleb MacDonald | Defenseman | Canada | Transferred to North Dakota |
| Cade Neilson | Defenseman | United Kingdom | Transferred to Michigan Tech |
| Derek Pys | Defenseman | Canada | Transferred to Prince Edward Island |
| Brady Risk | Forward | Canada | Graduate transfer to Omaha |
| Jonny Sorenson | Forward | United States | Graduation (signed with Iowa Heartlanders) |
| Filip Wiberg | Forward | Norway | Transferred to Geneseo State |

== Recruiting ==
| Player | Position | Nationality | Age | Notes |
|---|---|---|---|---|
| Noah Barlage | Defenseman | Canada | 21 | Humboldt, SK |
| Adam Cardona | Defenseman | Canada | 20 | Beaconsfield, QC; transfer from Massachusetts Lowell |
| Caelum Dick | Defenseman | Canada | 20 | Sherwood Park, AB |
| Nicholas Grabko | Goaltender | United States | 24 | Channahon, IL; graduate transfer from Bentley |
| Matt Hubbarde | Forward | Canada | 24 | Pickering, ON; transfer from Providence |
| Luke Johnson | Forward | United States | 22 | St. Cloud, MN; transfer from Minnesota Duluth |
| Haden Kruse | Forward | United States | 21 | Nisswa, MN |
| Luke LaMaster | Defenseman | United States | 24 | Duluth, MN; graduate transfer from Wisconsin |
| Bryce Monrean | Forward | United States | 21 | Anchorage, AK |
| Fyodor Nikolayenya | Forward | Belarus | 21 | Minsk, BLR |
| Trenton Penner | Forward | Canada | 21 | Winkler, MB |
| Peyton Platter | Forward | United States | 20 | Eau Claire, WI |
| Cole Plowman | Goaltender | Canada | 21 | Winnipeg, MB |
| Carson Reed | Defenseman | United States | 20 | Warroad, MN |
| Matt Rickard | Defenseman | United States | 25 | Coventry, RI; graduate transfer from American International |
| Nathan Rickey | Defenseman | United States | 20 | New Lenox, IL |
| Brendan Ross | Forward | Canada | 21 | Calgary, AB |
| Dean Spak | Forward | Canada | 21 | Calgary, AB |
| Tyler Waram | Defenseman | United States | 21 | Edmonds, WA |

== Roster ==
As of August 3, 2024.

| No. | Nat. | Player | Class | Pos | Height | Weight | DoB | Hometown | Previous team | NHL rights |
|---|---|---|---|---|---|---|---|---|---|---|
| 2 | (United States) | Carson Reed | Freshman | D | 6' 0" (1.83 m) | 194 lb (88 kg) | 2004-04-20 | Warroad, Minnesota | Waterloo Black Hawks (USHL) | — |
| 4 | (Canada) | Noah Barlage | Freshman | D | 6' 0" (1.83 m) | 185 lb (84 kg) | 2003-03-28 | Humboldt, Saskatchewan | Madison Capitols (USHL) | — |
| 5 | (United States) | Tyler Waram | Freshman | D | 6' 1" (1.85 m) | 192 lb (87 kg) | 2003-03-13 | Edmonds, Washington | Victoria Grizzlies (BCHL) | — |
| 6 | (United States) | Matt Rickard | Graduate | D | 6' 0" (1.83 m) | 190 lb (86 kg) | 1999-07-28 | Coventry, Rhode Island | American International (AHA) | — |
| 7 | (United States) | Broten Sabo | Sophomore | D | 6' 2" (1.88 m) | 194 lb (88 kg) | 2002-08-09 | Rosemount, Minnesota | St. Cloud Norsemen (NAHL) | — |
| 8 | (United States) | Will Hilfiker | Junior | D | 6' 2" (1.88 m) | 205 lb (93 kg) | 2001-08-07 | Middletown, New Jersey | Bonnyville Pontiacs (AJHL) | — |
| 9 | (Canada) | Dean Spak | Freshman | F | 5' 10" (1.78 m) | 181 lb (82 kg) | 2003-02-21 | Calgary, Alberta | Okotoks Oilers (BCHL) | — |
| 10 | (United States) | William Lawson-Body | Sophomore | F | 5' 10" (1.78 m) | 170 lb (77 kg) | 2002-04-04 | Grand Forks, North Dakota | Oklahoma Warriors (NAHL) | — |
| 11 | (United States) | Haden Kruse | Freshman | F | 6' 1" (1.85 m) | 172 lb (78 kg) | 2003-03-25 | Nisswa, Minnesota | Janesville Jets (NAHL) | — |
| 12 | (Canada) | Adam Cardona | Sophomore | D | 6' 2" (1.88 m) | 188 lb (85 kg) | 2003-10-05 | Beaconsfield, Quebec | Massachusetts Lowell (HEA) | — |
| 13 | (Belarus) | Fyodor Nikolayenya | Sophomore | F | 5' 11" (1.8 m) | 179 lb (81 kg) | 2003-02-28 | Minsk, Belarus | Anchorage Wolverines (NAHL) | — |
| 14 | (Russia) | Anton Rubtsov | Senior | F | 5' 10" (1.78 m) | 165 lb (75 kg) | 1999-03-06 | Saint Petersburg, Russia | Shreveport Mudbugs (NAHL) | — |
| 15 | (Canada) | Braden Birnie (C) | Junior | F | 6' 2" (1.88 m) | 195 lb (88 kg) | 2001-08-19 | Weyburn, Saskatchewan | Steinbach Pistons (MJHL) | — |
| 16 | (Canada) | Trenton Penner | Freshman | F | 6' 2" (1.88 m) | 190 lb (86 kg) | 2003-02-23 | Winkler, Manitoba | Winkler Flyers (MJHL) | — |
| 17 | (United States) | Luke Johnson | Junior | F | 5' 9" (1.75 m) | 165 lb (75 kg) | 2001-10-15 | St. Cloud, Minnesota | Minnesota Duluth (NCHC) | — |
| 18 | (Canada) | Brendan Ross | Freshman | F | 6' 3" (1.91 m) | 187 lb (85 kg) | 2003-07-08 | Calgary, Alberta | Blackfalds Bulldogs (BCHL) | — |
| 20 | (United States) | Cade Ahrenholz | Junior | F | 6' 3" (1.91 m) | 218 lb (99 kg) | 2002-11-30 | Lakeville, Minnesota | Colorado College (NCHC) | — |
| 23 | (Canada) | Caelum Dick | Freshman | D | 5' 10" (1.78 m) | 183 lb (83 kg) | 2003-11-21 | Sherwood Park, Alberta | Dubuque Fighting Saints (USHL) | — |
| 24 | (United States) | Peyton Platter | Freshman | F | 6' 1" (1.85 m) | 181 lb (82 kg) | 2003-11-02 | Eau Claire, Wisconsin | Chippewa Steel (NAHL) | — |
| 25 | (United States) | Luke LaMaster | Graduate | D | 6' 0" (1.83 m) | 187 lb (85 kg) | 1999-10-17 | Duluth, Minnesota | Wisconsin (USHL) | — |
| 26 | (United States) | Nathan Rickey | Freshman | D | 6' 4" (1.93 m) | 170 lb (77 kg) | 2003-11-20 | New Lenox, Illinois | Oklahoma Warriors (NAHL) | — |
| 27 | (Canada) | Matteo Pecchia | Senior | F | 5' 10" (1.78 m) | 185 lb (84 kg) | 2000-06-05 | Nobleton, Ontario | Western Michigan (NCHC) | — |
| 28 | (Canada) | Brayden Nicholetts (A) | Senior | F | 5' 11" (1.8 m) | 180 lb (82 kg) | 1999-08-27 | Spruce Grove, Alberta | Spruce Grove Saints (AJHL) | — |
| 31 | (Canada) | Cole Plowman | Freshman | G | 6' 0" (1.83 m) | 179 lb (81 kg) | 2003-03-24 | Winnipeg, Manitoba | Steinbach Pistons (MJHL) | — |
| 32 | (United States) | Bryce Monrean | Freshman | F | 5' 11" (1.8 m) | 165 lb (75 kg) | 2003-05-28 | Anchorage, Alaska | Kenai River Brown Bears (NAHL) | — |
| 34 | (United States) | Kyle Gaffney (A) | Junior | F | 6' 0" (1.83 m) | 180 lb (82 kg) | 2001-09-05 | Plymouth, Michigan | Aberdeen Wings (NAHL) | — |
| 35 | (Finland) | Lassi Lehti | Junior | G | 6' 3" (1.91 m) | 210 lb (95 kg) | 2001-11-29 | Espoo, Finland | Minot Minotauros (NAHL) | — |
| 37 | (Canada) | Chase Dafoe (A) | Junior | F | 6' 3" (1.91 m) | 200 lb (91 kg) | 2002-02-25 | Peachland, British Columbia | Providence (HEA) | — |
| 39 | (Canada) | Matt Hubbarde | Senior | F | 6' 1" (1.85 m) | 190 lb (86 kg) | 2000-04-15 | Pickering, Ontario | Providence (HEA) | — |
| 40 | (United States) | Matt Koethe (A) | Senior | F | 5' 10" (1.78 m) | 185 lb (84 kg) | 1999-09-28 | Minnetonka, Minnesota | Fairbanks Ice Dogs (NAHL) | — |
| 50 | (United States) | Nicholas Grabko | Graduate | G | 6' 0" (1.83 m) | 187 lb (85 kg) | 2000-02-06 | Channahon, Illinois | Bentley (AHA) | — |

== Standings ==
2024–25 NCAA Division I Independent ice hockey standings
| | Overall record | | | | | |
| | GP | W | L | T | GF | GA |
|---|---|---|---|---|---|---|
| Alaska | 32 | 12 | 14 | 6 | 73 | 87 |
| Alaska Anchorage | 34 | 6 | 23 | 5 | 75 | 117 |
| Lindenwood | 32 | 8 | 22 | 2 | 65 | 86 |
| Long Island | 34 | 20 | 12 | 2 | 111 | 77 |
| Stonehill | 34 | 12 | 22 | 0 | 76 | 106 |
Rankings: USCHO.com Top 20 Poll

== Schedule and results ==
| Date | Time | Opponent^{#} | Rank^{#} | Site | TV | Decision | Result | Attendance | Record |
Exhibition
| September 28 | 7:07 pm | Grand Canyon* | | Big Dipper Ice Arena • Fairbanks, Alaska (Exhibition) | FloHockey | | W 5–4 | | |
Regular Season
| October 5 | 7:07 pm | Penn State* | | Big Dipper Ice Arena • Fairbanks, Alaska | FloHockey | Grabko | L 3–4 ^{OT} | 2,242 | 0–1–0 |
| October 6 | 5:07 pm | Penn State* | | Big Dipper Ice Arena • Fairbanks, Alaska | FloHockey | Lehti | L 0–5 | 1,925 | 0–2–0 |
| October 11 | 3:07 pm | at Michigan Tech* | | MacInnes Student Ice Arena • Houghton, Michigan | Midco Sports+ | Grabko | L 1–2 ^{OT} | 3,156 | 0–3–0 |
| October 12 | 2:07 pm | at Michigan Tech* | | MacInnes Student Ice Arena • Houghton, Michigan | Midco Sports+ | Grabko | L 1–2 | 2,894 | 0–4–0 |
| October 18 | 3:00 pm | at #18 Notre Dame* | | Compton Family Ice Arena • Notre Dame, Indiana | Peacock | Grabko | L 1–4 | 4,866 | 0–5–0 |
| October 19 | 2:00 pm | at #18 Notre Dame* | | Compton Family Ice Arena • Notre Dame, Indiana | Peacock | Grabko | W 1–0 | 4,396 | 1–5–0 |
| November 1 | 3:00 pm | at Clarkson* | | Cheel Arena • Potsdam, New York | ESPN+ | Grabko | W 3–1 | 2,352 | 2–5–0 |
| November 2 | 3:00 pm | at Clarkson* | | Cheel Arena • Potsdam, New York | ESPN+ | Grabko | T 3–3 ^{OT} | 2,633 | 2–5–1 |
| November 8 | 3:00 pm | at Union* | | Achilles Rink • Schenectady, New York | ESPN+ | Grabko | T 3–3 ^{OT} | 1,267 | 2–5–2 |
| November 9 | 12:00 pm | at Union* | | Achilles Rink • Schenectady, New York | ESPN+ | Grabko | W 6–4 | 1,681 | 3–5–2 |
| November 15 | 7:07 pm | at Alaska Anchorage* | | Avis Alaska Sports Complex • Anchorage, Alaska (Governor's Cup) | | Grabko | W 3–2 | 675 | 4–5–2 |
| November 16 | 5:07 pm | at Alaska Anchorage* | | Avis Alaska Sports Complex • Anchorage, Alaska (Governor's Cup) | | Grabko | L 1–6 | 712 | 4–6–2 |
| November 29 | 4:00 pm | at #3 Minnesota* | | 3M Arena at Mariucci • Minneapolis, Minnesota | Fox 9+ | Grabko | T 1–1 ^{OT} | 9,580 | 4–6–3 |
| November 30 | 2:00 pm | at #3 Minnesota* | | 3M Arena at Mariucci • Minneapolis, Minnesota | Fox 9+ | Grabko | L 2–5 | 9,933 | 4–7–3 |
| December 6 | 7:07 pm | Augustana* | | Carlson Center • Fairbanks, Alaska | FloHockey | Grabko | L 1–3 | 3,005 | 4–8–3 |
| December 7 | 7:07 pm | Augustana* | | Carlson Center • Fairbanks, Alaska | FloHockey | Lehti | W 2–1 | 3,117 | 5–8–3 |
Holiday Face–Off
| December 28 | 10:30 am | vs. Connecticut* | | Fiserv Forum • Milwaukee, Wisconsin (Holiday Face–Off Semifinal) | | Grabko | L 1–4 | 6,625 | 5–9–3 |
| December 29 | 10:30 am | vs. Ferris State* | | Fiserv Forum • Milwaukee, Wisconsin (Holiday Face–Off Consolation Game) | | Lehti | W 4–1 | 4,920 | 6–9–3 |
| January 3 | 4:07 pm | at Minnesota Duluth* | | AMSOIL Arena • Duluth, Minnesota | | Lehti | T 2–2 ^{OT} | 5,128 | 6–9–4 |
| January 4 | 3:07 pm | at Minnesota Duluth* | | AMSOIL Arena • Duluth, Minnesota | | Grabko | W 2–1 ^{OT} | 5,172 | 7–9–4 |
| January 10 | 7:07 pm | Simon Fraser* | | Carlson Center • Fairbanks, Alaska (Exhibition) | FloHockey | Grabko | W 2–1 ^{OT} | 1,945 | |
| January 11 | 7:07 pm | Simon Fraser* | | Carlson Center • Fairbanks, Alaska (Exhibition) | FloHockey | Lehti | W 6–3 | 3,165 | |
| January 18 | 7:07 pm | at Alaska Anchorage* | | Avis Alaska Sports Complex • Anchorage, Alaska (Governor's Cup) | | Grabko | T 3–3 ^{OT} | 715 | 7–9–5 |
| January 24 | 3:00 pm | at Massachusetts* | | Mullins Center • Amherst, Massachusetts | ESPN+ | Lehti | L 2–4 | 3,058 | 7–10–5 |
| January 25 | 2:00 pm | at Massachusetts* | | Mullins Center • Amherst, Massachusetts | ESPN+ | Grabko | L 3–7 | 3,263 | 7–11–5 |
| January 31 | 7:07 pm | Alaska Anchorage* | | Carlson Center • Fairbanks, Alaska (Governor's Cup) | FloHockey | Lehti | W 3–1 | 2,466 | 8–11–5 |
| February 1 | 7:07 pm | Alaska Anchorage* | | Carlson Center • Fairbanks, Alaska (Governor's Cup) | FloHockey | Lehti | W 5–1 | 3,180 | 9–11–5 |
| February 8 | 5:07 pm | Alaska Anchorage* | | Carlson Center • Fairbanks, Alaska (Governor's Cup) | FloHockey | Lehti | T 3–3 ^{OT} | 3,375 | 9–11–6 |
| February 14 | 4:10 pm | at Lindenwood* | | Centene Community Ice Center • St. Charles, Missouri | | Lehti | W 2–1 ^{OT} | 1,427 | 10–11–6 |
| February 15 | 11:10 am | at Lindenwood* | | Centene Community Ice Center • St. Charles, Missouri | | Grabko | L 2–5 | 1,133 | 10–12–6 |
| February 21 | 4:07 pm | at Augustana* | | Midco Arena • Sioux Falls, South Dakota | Midco Sports+ | Lehti | W 2–1 | 2,970 | 11–12–6 |
| February 22 | 3:07 pm | at Augustana* | | Midco Arena • Sioux Falls, South Dakota | Midco Sports+ | Lehti | W 5–3 | 3,106 | 12–12–6 |
| February 28 | 3:30 pm | at Long Island* | | Northwell Health Ice Center • East Meadow, New York | ESPN+ | Lehti | L 2–4 | 357 | 12–13–6 |
| March 1 | 3:30 pm | at Long Island* | | Northwell Health Ice Center • East Meadow, New York | ESPN+ | Grabko | L 0–2 | 125 | 12–14–6 |
*Non-conference game. ^{#}Rankings from USCHO.com Poll. All times are in Alaska Time. Source:

== Scoring statistics ==
| Name | Position | Games | Goals | Assists | Points | PIM |
|---|---|---|---|---|---|---|
| Matt Hubbarde | C | 30 | 13 | 10 | 23 | 25 |
| Broten Sabo | D | 32 | 8 | 13 | 21 | 31 |
| Kyle Gaffney | F | 32 | 6 | 14 | 20 | 6 |
| Chase Dafoe | F | 32 | 11 | 6 | 17 | 39 |
| Brendan Ross | F | 31 | 3 | 11 | 14 | 10 |
| Matt Koethe | F | 32 | 2 | 11 | 13 | 24 |
| Peyton Platter | C/LW/RW | 32 | 2 | 11 | 13 | 24 |
| Caelum Dick | D | 25 | 1 | 7 | 8 | 10 |
| Braden Birnie | F | 32 | 4 | 3 | 7 | 12 |
| Matthew Rickard | D | 25 | 4 | 2 | 6 | 18 |
| Haden Kruse | F | 15 | 3 | 3 | 6 | 2 |
| Luke LaMaster | D | 27 | 0 | 6 | 6 | 10 |
| William Lawson-Body | F | 31 | 2 | 3 | 5 | 2 |
| Adam Cardona | D | 31 | 0 | 5 | 5 | 32 |
| Anton Rubtsov | F | 13 | 3 | 1 | 4 | 8 |
| Cade Ahrenholz | RW | 24 | 3 | 1 | 4 | 41 |
| Luke Johnson | C/LW | 15 | 2 | 2 | 4 | 4 |
| Nathan Rickey | D | 24 | 1 | 3 | 4 | 8 |
| Fyodor Nikolayenya | F | 28 | 1 | 2 | 3 | 20 |
| Carson Reed | D | 31 | 1 | 1 | 2 | 10 |
| Noah Barlage | D | 15 | 0 | 2 | 2 | 2 |
| Trenton Penner | F | 10 | 0 | 1 | 1 | 4 |
| Cole Plowman | G | 1 | 0 | 0 | 0 | 0 |
| Tyler Waram | D | 1 | 0 | 0 | 0 | 0 |
| Dean Spak | F | 3 | 0 | 0 | 0 | 0 |
| Bryce Monrean | F | 4 | 0 | 0 | 0 | 6 |
| Matteo Pecchia | LW | 6 | 0 | 0 | 0 | 6 |
| Will Hilfiker | D | 11 | 0 | 0 | 0 | 15 |
| Lassi Lehti | G | 13 | 0 | 0 | 0 | 0 |
| Brayden Nicholetts | F | 16 | 0 | 0 | 0 | 11 |
| Nicholas Grabko | G | 20 | 0 | 0 | 0 | 4 |
| Total | | | 73 | 112 | 185 | 386 |

== Goaltending statistics ==
| Name | Games | Minutes | Wins | Losses | Ties | Goals against | Saves | Shut outs | SV % | GAA |
|---|---|---|---|---|---|---|---|---|---|---|
| Cole Plowman | 1 | 6:57 | 0 | 0 | 0 | 0 | 0 | 0 | — | 0.00 |
| Lassi Lehti | 13 | 735:05 | 7 | 3 | 2 | 25 | 303 | 0 | .924 | 2.04 |
| Nicholas Grabko | 20 | 1182:26 | 5 | 11 | 4 | 54 | 480 | 1 | .899 | 2.77 |
| Empty Net | - | 35:30 | - | - | - | 10 | - | - | - | - |
| Total | 32 | 1959:58 | 12 | 14 | 6 | 89 | 785 | 1 | .898 | 2.72 |

== Rankings ==
| Poll | Week | | | | | | | | | | | | | | | | | | | | | | | | | | | |
| Poll | Pre | 1 | 2 | 3 | 4 | 5 | 6 | 7 | 8 | 9 | 10 | 11 | 12 | 13 | 14 | 15 | 16 | 17 | 18 | 19 | 20 | 21 | 22 | 23 | 24 | 25 | 26 | 27 (Final) |
|---|---|---|---|---|---|---|---|---|---|---|---|---|---|---|---|---|---|---|---|---|---|---|---|---|---|---|---|---|
| USCHO.com | NR | NR | NR | NR | NR | NR | NR | NR | NR | NR | NR | NR | – | NR | NR | NR | NR | NR | NR | NR | NR | NR | NR | NR | NR | NR | – | NR |
| USA Hockey | NR | NR | NR | NR | NR | NR | NR | NR | NR | NR | NR | NR | – | NR | NR | NR | NR | NR | NR | NR | NR | NR | NR | NR | NR | NR | NR | NR |

Note: USCHO did not release a poll in week 12 or 26.
Note: USA Hockey did not release a poll in week 12.
