= 2024–25 NCAA Division I independent men's ice hockey season =

2024–25 NCAA Division I Independent men's ice hockey season
- Season: 2024–25
- Conference: NCAA Division I Independent
- Division: Division I
- Sport: men's ice hockey
- Duration: October 4, 2024– March 1, 2025
- Number of teams: 5

Regular season

NCAA tournament

The 2024–25 NCAA Division I Independent men's ice hockey season is the 131st season of play for varsity ice hockey in the United States. The regular season began on October 4, 2024, and conclude on March 1, 2025.

== Coaches ==
In the offseason, Lindenwood hired Bill Muckalt to replace Rick Zombo as head coach.

After 10 years as head of the program, David Borges retired from coaching and Stonehill turned to David Berard to head the program.

=== Records ===
Team	Head coach	Season at school*	Record at school*
Alaska	Erik Largen	6	81–78–15
Alaska Anchorage	Matt Shasby	3	23–36–3
Lindenwood	Bill Muckalt	1	0–0–0
Long Island	Brett Riley	5	42–73–5
Stonehill	David Berard	1	0–0–0

== Standings ==
2024–25 NCAA Division I Independent ice hockey standings
	Overall record					
	GP	W	L	T	GF	GA
Alaska	32	12	14	6	73	87
Alaska Anchorage	34	6	23	5	75	117
Lindenwood	32	8	22	2	65	86
Long Island	34	20	12	2	111	77
Stonehill	34	12	22	0	76	106
Rankings: USCHO.com Top 20 Poll

== Ranking ==
=== USCHO ===
Team	Pre	1	2	3	4	5	6	7	8	9	10	12	13	14	15	16	17	18	19	20	21	22	23	24	25	Final
Alaska	NR	NR	NR	NR	NR	NR	NR	NR	NR	NR	NR	NR	NR	NR	NR	NR	NR	NR	NR	NR	NR	NR	NR	NR	NR	NR
Alaska Anchorage	NR	NR	NR	NR	NR	NR	NR	NR	NR	NR	NR	NR	NR	NR	NR	NR	NR	NR	NR	NR	NR	NR	NR	NR	NR	NR
Lindenwood	NR	NR	NR	NR	NR	NR	NR	NR	NR	NR	NR	NR	NR	NR	NR	NR	NR	NR	NR	NR	NR	NR	NR	NR	NR	NR
Long Island	NR	NR	NR	NR	NR	NR	NR	NR	NR	NR	NR	NR	NR	NR	NR	NR	NR	NR	NR	NR	NR	NR	NR	NR	NR	NR
Stonehill	NR	NR	NR	NR	NR	NR	NR	NR	NR	NR	NR	NR	NR	NR	NR	NR	NR	NR	NR	NR	NR	NR	NR	NR	NR	NR

Note: USCHO did not release a poll in week 12 or 26.

=== USA Hockey ===
Team	Pre	1	2	3	4	5	6	7	8	9	10	11	13	14	15	16	17	18	19	20	21	22	23	24	25	26	Final
Alaska	NR	NR	NR	NR	NR	NR	NR	NR	NR	NR	NR	NR	NR	NR	NR	NR	NR	NR	NR	NR	NR	NR	NR	NR	NR	NR	NR
Alaska Anchorage	NR	NR	NR	NR	NR	NR	NR	NR	NR	NR	NR	NR	NR	NR	NR	NR	NR	NR	NR	NR	NR	NR	NR	NR	NR	NR	NR
Lindenwood	NR	NR	NR	NR	NR	NR	NR	NR	NR	NR	NR	NR	NR	NR	NR	NR	NR	NR	NR	NR	NR	NR	NR	NR	NR	NR	NR
Long Island	NR	NR	NR	NR	NR	NR	NR	NR	NR	NR	NR	NR	NR	NR	NR	NR	NR	NR	NR	NR	NR	NR	NR	NR	NR	NR	NR
Stonehill	NR	NR	NR	NR	NR	NR	NR	NR	NR	NR	NR	NR	NR	NR	NR	NR	NR	NR	NR	NR	NR	NR	NR	NR	NR	NR	NR

Note: USA Hockey did not release a poll in week 12.

=== PairWise ===
Team	1	2	3	4	5	6	7	8	9	10	11	13	14	15	16	17	18	19	20	21	22	23	24	Final
Alaska	26	51	51	48	34	22	34	37	35	38	37	39	32	33	34	37	38	38	39	35	37	41	38	38
Alaska Anchorage	28	56	54	57	61	61	59	62	61	57	56	55	54	54	54	54	58	57	60	59	59	59	59	59
Lindenwood	28	44	48	44	40	47	54	57	57	60	54	54	54	54	54	56	55	55	54	54	56	54	54	54
Long Island	28	48	23	35	42	53	27	29	23	21	21	26	21	27	29	28	38	34	32	31	26	26	26	25
Stonehill	15	31	43	42	40	52	56	56	53	59	58	58	58	59	56	59	60	60	59	59	59	59	59	59

Note: teams ranked in the top-10 automatically qualify for the NCAA tournament. Teams ranked 11-16 can qualify based upon conference tournament results.
