= Alaska–Alaska Anchorage men's ice hockey rivalry =

College sports rivalry

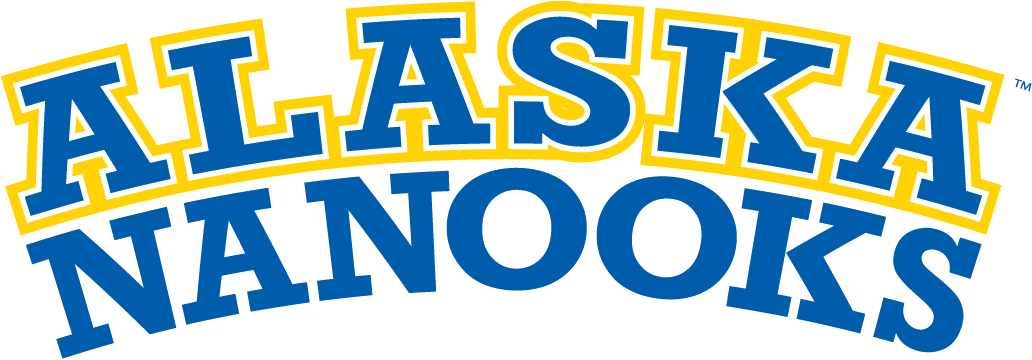
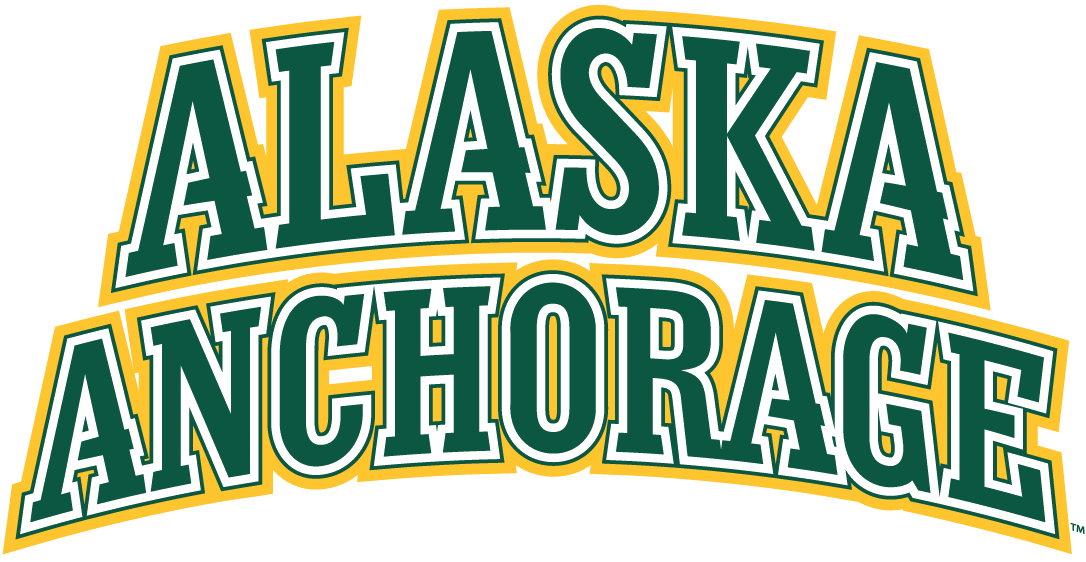
- Alaska Nanooks Alaska Anchorage Seawolves
- Sport: Ice hockey
- First meeting: November 21, 1980; Alaska Anchorage 10, Alaska 5
- Latest meeting: 3 February 2024; Alaska Anchorage 4, Alaska 2
- Next meeting: TBD
- Stadiums: Carlson Center; Avis Alaska Sports Complex
- Trophy: Governor's Cup

Statistics
- Total meetings: 183
- All-time series: Alaska, 88–82–13 (.516)
- Trophy series: Alaska, 18–8
- Largest victory: Alaska Anchorage, 9–1 (22 November 1980)
- Longest win streak: Alaska, 12 (28 February 2020 – 2 December 2023)
- Longest unbeaten streak: Alaska, 13 (28 February 2020 – 13 January 2024)
- Current win streak: Alaska Anchorage, 1

Locations of Alaska and Alaska Anchorage

The Alaska–Alaska Anchorage men's ice hockey rivalry is a college ice hockey rivalry between the Alaska Nanooks men's ice hockey and Alaska Anchorage Seawolves men's ice hockey programs. The first meeting between the two occurred on November 16, 1979.

== History ==
Alaska, originally Alaska Agricultural College, began playing ice hockey in 1925. However, due to being so far away from any other college team, the program had difficulty finding opponents. This was a contributing factor in the school suspending its ice hockey program several times over the next 50 years. Alaska Anchorage, with assistance of head coach Brush Christiansen, promoted its ice hockey program to varsity status in 1979. A year later Alaska, then Alaska–Fairbanks, followed suit. The two programs were able to stabilize one another by providing a consistent opponent and allowing each team to steadily improve. Due to their proximity and the sheer number of times they played one another in the 1980 it would have almost been impossible for the two programs to not have become rivals.

In 1984, both programs were promoted to Division I status when the entire Division II level collapsed. A year later they joined with two teams from the lower-48 to form the Great West Hockey Conference. The experiment lasted just three years but it did give the two Alaska schools a greater profile in college hockey and eventually led to both joining other more established conferences. When Alaska Anchorage joined the WCHA in 1993, it caused the number of meeting between the two schools to drop but they continued to play one another each season. In order to continue the relevance of the rivalry, the 93–94 season was the inaugural year that the Governor's Cup was awarded.

In the interim, Alaska joined the CCHA and remained with the league for 19 years until it was dissolved in 2013. Alaska then joined the WCHA and the two programs became conference rivals once more. In 2010s, with Alaska facing an economic downturn, there were rumors that the two programs would be merged to reduce the cost of operating both programs. While this plan never came to fruition, the COVID-19 pandemic caused a financial crisis for both clubs. Alaska was able to survive the troubles but in 2020, Alaska Anchorage announced that the 2020–21 season would be their last. In the end, the pandemic forced the Seawolves to cancel the campaign and suspend operations in November.

Fundraising efforts did eventually succeed in allowing Alaska Anchorage to announce its return for the 22–23 season. While both teams will likely be playing one another soon, neither is a member of a conference and their long-term viability has yet to be settled.

== Game results ==
Full game results for the rivalry, with rankings beginning in the 1998–99 season.

| Alaska victories | Alaska Anchorage victories | Tie games |

| No. | Date | Location | Winning team | | Losing team | | Notes |
|---|---|---|---|---|---|---|---|
| 1 | 21 November 1980 | Anchorage, AK | Alaska Anchorage | 10 | Alaska | 5 | |
| 2 | 22 November 1980 | Anchorage, AK | Alaska Anchorage | 9 | Alaska | 1 | |
| 3 | 28 November 1980 | Fairbanks, AK | Alaska Anchorage | 9 | Alaska | 5 | |
| 4 | 29 November 1980 | Fairbanks, AK | Alaska Anchorage | 6 | Alaska | 5 | |
| 5 | 30 January 1981 | Fairbanks, AK | Alaska Anchorage | 7 | Alaska | 6 | |
| 6 | 31 January 1981 | Fairbanks, AK | Alaska Anchorage | 5 | Alaska | 2 | |
| 7 | 27 February 1981 | Anchorage, AK | Alaska Anchorage | 6 | Alaska | 5 | (OT) |
| 8 | 28 February 1981 | Anchorage, AK | Alaska Anchorage | 8 | Alaska | 1 | |
| 9 | 13 November 1981 | Fairbanks, AK | Alaska | 3 | Alaska Anchorage | 2 | Forfeit |
| 10 | 14 November 1981 | Fairbanks, AK | Alaska Anchorage | 8 | Alaska | 1 | |
| 11 | 1 December 1981 | Anchorage, AK | Alaska | 5 | Alaska Anchorage | 4 | Forfeit |
| 12 | 2 December 1981 | Anchorage, AK | Alaska Anchorage | 6 | Alaska | 3 | |
| 13 | 22 January 1982 | Anchorage, AK | Alaska Anchorage | 7 | Alaska | 3 | |
| 14 | 23 January 1982 | Anchorage, AK | Alaska Anchorage | 5 | Alaska | 1 | |
| 15 | 12 November 1982 | Fairbanks, AK | Alaska Anchorage | 8 | Alaska | 4 | |
| 16 | 13 November 1982 | Fairbanks, AK | Alaska | 4 | Alaska Anchorage | 3 | (OT) |
| 17 | 10 December 1982 | Anchorage, AK | Alaska | 6 | Alaska Anchorage | 3 | |
| 18 | 11 December 1982 | Anchorage, AK | Alaska | 4 | Alaska Anchorage | 3 | |
| 19 | 9 December 1983 | Anchorage, AK | Alaska Anchorage | 9 | Alaska | 3 | |
| 20 | 10 December 1983 | Anchorage, AK | Alaska Anchorage | 7 | Alaska | 2 | |
| 21 | 17 February 1984 | Fairbanks, AK | Alaska | 6 | Alaska Anchorage | 5 | |
| 22 | 18 February 1984 | Fairbanks, AK | Alaska | 5 | Alaska Anchorage | 1 | |
| 23 | 7 December 1984 | Fairbanks, AK | Alaska | 5 | Alaska Anchorage | 3 | |
| 24 | 8 December 1984 | Fairbanks, AK | Alaska Anchorage | 4 | Alaska | 2 | |
| 25 | 1 January 1985 | Anchorage, AK | Alaska Anchorage | 3 | Alaska | 2 | |
| 26 | 2 January 1985 | Anchorage, AK | Alaska | 7 | Alaska Anchorage | 3 | |
| 27 | 22 February 1985 | Fairbanks, AK | Alaska | 7 | Alaska Anchorage | 4 | |
| 28 | 23 February 1985 | Fairbanks, AK | Alaska | 8 | Alaska Anchorage | 7 | (OT) |
| 29 | 6 December 1985 | Fairbanks, AK | Alaska | 6 | Alaska Anchorage | 4 | GWHC play begins |
| 30 | 7 December 1985 | Fairbanks, AK | Alaska Anchorage | 5 | Alaska | 4 | (OT) |
| 31 | 31 January 1986 | Fairbanks, AK | Alaska | 6 | Alaska Anchorage | 5 | |
| 32 | 1 February 1986 | Fairbanks, AK | Alaska Anchorage | 4 | Alaska | 1 | |
| 33 | 3 March 1986 | Anchorage, AK | Tie | 3 | Tie | 3 | (OT) |
| 34 | 4 March 1986 | Anchorage, AK | Alaska | 5 | Alaska Anchorage | 3 | |
| 35 | 7 November 1986 | Fairbanks, AK | Alaska Anchorage | 7 | Alaska | 4 | |
| 36 | 8 November 1986 | Fairbanks, AK | Alaska Anchorage | 5 | Alaska | 4 | |
| 37 | 5 December 1986 | Fairbanks, AK | Alaska | 6 | Alaska Anchorage | 5 | |
| 38 | 6 December 1986 | Anchorage, AK | Alaska Anchorage | 6 | Alaska | 3 | |
| 39 | 30 January 1987 | Anchorage, AK | Alaska Anchorage | 5 | Alaska | 4 | |
| 40 | 31 January 1987 | Anchorage, AK | Alaska | 8 | Alaska Anchorage | 6 | |
| 41 | 27 February 1987 | Fairbanks, AK | Alaska | 7 | Alaska Anchorage | 3 | |
| 42 | 28 February 1987 | Anchorage, AK | Alaska Anchorage | 9 | Alaska | 2 | |
| 43 | 27 November 1987 | Fairbanks, AK | Alaska Anchorage | 6 | Alaska | 3 | |
| 44 | 28 November 1987 | Fairbanks, AK | Tie | 3 | Tie | 3 | (OT) |
| 45 | 4 December 1987 | Anchorage, AK | Alaska | 6 | Alaska Anchorage | 4 | |
| 46 | 5 December 1987 | Anchorage, AK | Alaska | 4 | Alaska Anchorage | 2 | |
| 47 | 20 December 1987 | Anchorage, AK | Tie | 6 | Tie | 6 | (OT), Jeep/Nissan Classic consolation game |
| 48 | 4 March 1988 | Anchorage, AK | Alaska | 5 | Alaska Anchorage | 4 | |
| 49 | 5 March 1988 | Fairbanks, AK | Alaska | 5 | Alaska Anchorage | 4 | GWHC play ends |
| 50 | 3 November 1988 | Anchorage, AK | Alaska Anchorage | 7 | Alaska | 3 | |
| 51 | 4 November 1988 | Anchorage, AK | Alaska Anchorage | 9 | Alaska | 3 | |
| 52 | 9 December 1988 | Fairbanks, AK | Alaska | 4 | Alaska Anchorage | 3 | |
| 53 | 10 December 1988 | Fairbanks, AK | Alaska Anchorage | 3 | Alaska | 1 | |
| 54 | 27 February 1989 | Fairbanks, AK | Alaska | 7 | Alaska Anchorage | 4 | |
| 55 | 28 February 1989 | Fairbanks, AK | Alaska | 5 | Alaska Anchorage | 4 | |
| 56 | 3 March 1989 | Anchorage, AK | Alaska Anchorage | 3 | Alaska | 2 | |
| 57 | 4 March 1989 | Anchorage, AK | Alaska Anchorage | 6 | Alaska | 3 | |
| 58 | 10 November 1989 | Anchorage, AK | Alaska | 5 | Alaska Anchorage | 4 | (OT) |
| 59 | 11 November 1989 | Anchorage, AK | Alaska Anchorage | 8 | Alaska | 4 | |
| 60 | 8 December 1989 | Fairbanks, AK | Alaska | 2 | Alaska Anchorage | 1 | |
| 61 | 9 December 1989 | Fairbanks, AK | Alaska Anchorage | 5 | Alaska | 1 | |
| 62 | 27 January 1990 | Anchorage, AK | Alaska Anchorage | 10 | Alaska | 5 | |
| 63 | 16 February 1990 | Fairbanks, AK | Alaska | 9 | Alaska Anchorage | 6 | |
| 64 | 17 February 1990 | Fairbanks, AK | Alaska Anchorage | 5 | Alaska | 1 | |
| 65 | 29 November 1990 | Fairbanks, AK | Alaska | 5 | Alaska Anchorage | 4 | |
| 66 | 30 November 1990 | Anchorage, AK | Alaska Anchorage | 3 | Alaska | 2 | |
| 67 | 25 January 1991 | Anchorage, AK | Alaska Anchorage | 6 | Alaska | 4 | |
| 68 | 26 January 1991 | Fairbanks, AK | Alaska | 4 | Alaska Anchorage | 3 | |
| 69 | 1 March 1991 | Fairbanks, AK | Alaska Anchorage | 6 | Alaska | 5 | |
| 70 | 2 March 1991 | Anchorage, AK | Alaska | 4 | Alaska Anchorage | 3 | |
| 71 | 8 November 1991 | Anchorage, AK | Alaska Anchorage | 4 | Alaska | 2 | |
| 72 | 9 November 1991 | Anchorage, AK | Alaska Anchorage | 8 | Alaska | 4 | |
| 73 | 24 January 1992 | Fairbanks, AK | Alaska Anchorage | 6 | Alaska | 1 | |
| 74 | 25 January 1992 | Anchorage, AK | Alaska Anchorage | 7 | Alaska | 3 | |
| 75 | 21 February 1992 | Fairbanks, AK | Alaska | 6 | Alaska Anchorage | 3 | |
| 76 | 22 February 1992 | Fairbanks, AK | Alaska | 2 | Alaska Anchorage | 1 | (OT) |
| 77 | 7 March 1992 | Fairbanks, AK | Alaska Anchorage | 4 | Alaska | 3 | (OT) |
| 78 | 22 January 1993 | Anchorage, AK | Alaska Anchorage | 3 | Alaska | 1 | |
| 79 | 23 January 1993 | Anchorage, AK | Tie | 3 | Tie | 3 | (OT) |
| 80 | 19 February 1993 | Fairbanks, AK | Alaska Anchorage | 5 | Alaska | 4 | |
| 81 | 20 February 1993 | Anchorage, AK | Tie | 5 | Tie | 5 | (OT) |
| 82 | 22 October 1993 | Fairbanks, AK | Alaska Anchorage | 7 | Alaska | 6 | Alaska Anchorage joins WCHA |
| 83 | 23 October 1993 | Anchorage, AK | Alaska | 7 | Alaska Anchorage | 3 | Governor's Cup first awarded |
| 84 | 14 October 1994 | Fairbanks, AK | Alaska | 6 | Alaska Anchorage | 5 | Alaska joins CCHA |
| 85 | 15 October 1994 | Anchorage, AK | Alaska Anchorage | 6 | Alaska | 5 | |
| 86 | 13 October 1995 | Fairbanks, AK | Tie | 4 | Tie | 4 | (OT) |
| 87 | 14 October 1995 | Fairbanks, AK | Alaska Anchorage | 4 | Alaska | 1 | |
| 88 | 11 October 1996 | Fairbanks, AK | Alaska Anchorage | 3 | Alaska | 2 | |
| 89 | 12 October 1996 | Anchorage, AK | Alaska Anchorage | 5 | Alaska | 2 | |
| 90 | 17 October 1997 | Anchorage, AK | Tie | 5 | Tie | 5 | (OT) |
| 91 | 18 October 1997 | Fairbanks, AK | Alaska | 4 | Alaska Anchorage | 0 | |
| 92 | 16 October 1998 | Fairbanks, AK | Alaska | 5 | Alaska Anchorage | 4 | (OT) |
| 93 | 17 October 1998 | Anchorage, AK | Alaska Anchorage | 3 | Alaska | 1 | |
| 94 | 15 October 1999 | Fairbanks, AK | Alaska | 3 | Alaska Anchorage | 1 | |
| 95 | 16 October 1999 | Fairbanks, AK | Alaska Anchorage | 3 | Alaska | 1 | |
| 96 | 20 October 2000 | Fairbanks, AK | Alaska Anchorage | 3 | Alaska | 1 | |
| 97 | 22 October 2000 | Anchorage, AK | Alaska Anchorage | 3 | Alaska | 2 | |
| 98 | 2 March 2001 | Fairbanks, AK | Tie | 2 | Tie | 2 | (OT) |
| 99 | 3 March 2001 | Anchorage, AK | Alaska Anchorage | 3 | Alaska | 1 | |
| 100 | 19 October 2001 | Fairbanks, AK | Alaska | 5 | Alaska Anchorage | 2 | |
| 101 | 20 October 2001 | Fairbanks, AK | Alaska | 5 | Alaska Anchorage | 3 | |
| 102 | 1 March 2002 | Anchorage, AK | Alaska Anchorage | 4 | No. 11 Alaska | 2 | |
| 103 | 2 March 2002 | Anchorage, AK | No. 11 Alaska | 3 | Alaska Anchorage | 1 | |
| 104 | 11 October 2002 | Anchorage, AK | Alaska Anchorage | 4 | Alaska | 2 | |
| 105 | 12 October 2002 | Anchorage, AK | Alaska | 4 | Alaska Anchorage | 0 | |
| 106 | 7 March 2003 | Fairbanks, AK | Alaska | 6 | Alaska Anchorage | 4 | |
| 107 | 8 March 2003 | Fairbanks, AK | Alaska | 5 | Alaska Anchorage | 0 | |
| 108 | 10 October 2003 | Fairbanks, AK | Alaska Anchorage | 4 | Alaska | 2 | |
| 109 | 11 October 2003 | Fairbanks, AK | Alaska | 4 | Alaska Anchorage | 0 | |
| 110 | 5 March 2004 | Anchorage, AK | Alaska Anchorage | 5 | Alaska | 4 | |
| 111 | 6 March 2004 | Anchorage, AK | Alaska | 6 | Alaska Anchorage | 4 | |
| 112 | 22 October 2004 | Anchorage, AK | Alaska Anchorage | 5 | Alaska | 2 | |
| 113 | 23 October 2004 | Anchorage, AK | Alaska | 6 | Alaska Anchorage | 0 | |
| 114 | 4 March 2005 | Fairbanks, AK | Alaska | 3 | Alaska Anchorage | 1 | |
| 115 | 5 March 2005 | Fairbanks, AK | Tie | 3 | Tie | 3 | (OT) |
| 116 | 22 October 2005 | Anchorage, AK | No. 19 Alaska | 2 | Alaska Anchorage | 1 | |
| 117 | 23 October 2005 | Anchorage, AK | Alaska Anchorage | 2 | No. 19 Alaska | 1 | |
| 118 | 30 December 2005 | Fairbanks, AK | Alaska | 4 | Alaska Anchorage | 2 | |
| 119 | 31 December 2005 | Fairbanks, AK | Alaska | 3 | Alaska Anchorage | 0 | |
| 120 | 20 October 2006 | Fairbanks, AK | Alaska Anchorage | 6 | Alaska | 5 | (OT) |
| 121 | 21 October 2006 | Fairbanks, AK | Tie | 1 | Tie | 1 | (OT) |
| 122 | 29 December 2006 | Anchorage, AK | Alaska Anchorage | 4 | No. 19 Alaska | 1 | |
| 123 | 30 December 2006 | Anchorage, AK | Alaska Anchorage | 4 | No. 19 Alaska | 2 | |
| 124 | 19 October 2007 | Anchorage, AK | Alaska Anchorage | 4 | Alaska | 3 | |
| 125 | 20 October 2007 | Anchorage, AK | Alaska Anchorage | 5 | Alaska | 3 | |
| 126 | 20 December 2007 | Fairbanks, AK | Alaska Anchorage | 4 | Alaska | 2 | |
| 127 | 21 December 2007 | Fairbanks, AK | Tie | 2 | Tie | 2 | (OT) |
| 128 | 27 February 2009 | Fairbanks, AK | Alaska Anchorage | 1 | Alaska | 0 | |
| 129 | 28 February 2009 | Anchorage, AK | Alaska Anchorage | 3 | Alaska | 0 | |
| 130 | 26 February 2010 | Anchorage, AK | Alaska | 7 | Alaska Anchorage | 4 | |
| 131 | 27 February 2010 | Fairbanks, AK | Alaska | 3 | Alaska Anchorage | 2 | |
| 132 | 25 February 2011 | Fairbanks, AK | Alaska | 5 | Alaska Anchorage | 1 | |
| 133 | 26 February 2011 | Anchorage, AK | Alaska Anchorage | 4 | Alaska | 1 | |
| 134 | 24 February 2012 | Anchorage, AK | Alaska Anchorage | 3 | Alaska | 2 | |
| 135 | 25 February 2012 | Fairbanks, AK | Alaska | 3 | Alaska Anchorage | 1 | |
| 136 | 1 March 2013 | Fairbanks, AK | Alaska | 2 | Alaska Anchorage | 1 | (OT) |
| 137 | 2 March 2013 | Anchorage, AK | Alaska | 3 | Alaska Anchorage | 1 | |
| 138 | 6 December 2013 | Anchorage, AK | Alaska Anchorage | 3 | Alaska | 2 | Alaska joins WCHA |
| 139 | 7 December 2013 | Anchorage, AK | Alaska | 5 | Alaska Anchorage | 4 | |
| 140 | 7 March 2014 | Fairbanks, AK | Alaska | 7 | Alaska Anchorage | 2 | |
| 141 | 8 March 2014 | Fairbanks, AK | Alaska Anchorage | 3 | Alaska | 1 | |
| 142 | 13 March 2014 | Fairbanks, AK | Alaska | 3 | Alaska Anchorage | 2 | (OT), WCHA First Round game 1 |
| 143 | 14 March 2014 | Fairbanks, AK | Alaska Anchorage | 2 | Alaska | 1 | WCHA First Round game 2 |
| 144 | 15 March 2014 | Fairbanks, AK | Alaska Anchorage | 5 | Alaska | 4 | WCHA First Round game 3 |
| 145 | 16 January 2015 | Fairbanks, AK | Alaska Anchorage | 2 | Alaska | 1 | |
| 146 | 17 January 2015 | Fairbanks, AK | Alaska Anchorage | 3 | Alaska | 2 | (OT) |
| 147 | 6 March 2015 | Anchorage, AK | Alaska | 1 | Alaska Anchorage | 0 | WCHA First Round game 1 |
| 148 | 7 March 2015 | Anchorage, AK | Alaska | 3 | Alaska Anchorage | 2 | WCHA First Round game 2 |
| 149 | 11 December 2015 | Anchorage, AK | Alaska | 2 | Alaska Anchorage | 1 | |
| 150 | 12 December 2015 | Anchorage, AK | Tie | 1 | Tie | 1 | (OT) |
| 151 | 4 March 2016 | Fairbanks, AK | Alaska | 3 | Alaska Anchorage | 2 | |
| 152 | 5 March 2016 | Fairbanks, AK | Alaska | 3 | Alaska Anchorage | 2 | |
| 153 | 8 October 2016 | Anchorage, AK | Alaska | 4 | Alaska Anchorage | 1 | |
| 154 | 9 December 2016 | Fairbanks, AK | Alaska Anchorage | 3 | Alaska | 2 | |
| 155 | 10 December 2016 | Fairbanks, AK | Alaska | 3 | Alaska Anchorage | 1 | |
| 156 | 24 February 2017 | Anchorage, AK | Alaska | 4 | Alaska Anchorage | 3 | |
| 157 | 25 February 2017 | Anchorage, AK | Alaska | 2 | Alaska Anchorage | 1 | (OT) |
| 158 | 20 October 2017 | Anchorage, AK | Alaska | 6 | Alaska Anchorage | 2 | |
| 159 | 21 October 2017 | Fairbanks, AK | Alaska | 3 | Alaska Anchorage | 2 | |
| 160 | 8 December 2017 | Anchorage, AK | Alaska | 7 | Alaska Anchorage | 2 | |
| 161 | 9 December 2017 | Anchorage, AK | Alaska | 3 | Alaska Anchorage | 2 | |
| 162 | 23 February 2018 | Fairbanks, AK | Alaska Anchorage | 5 | Alaska | 3 | |
| 163 | 24 February 2018 | Fairbanks, AK | Alaska Anchorage | 3 | Alaska | 2 | |
| 164 | 8 February 2019 | Fairbanks, AK | Alaska Anchorage | 4 | Alaska | 1 | |
| 165 | 9 February 2019 | Fairbanks, AK | Alaska | 2 | Alaska Anchorage | 1 | |
| 166 | 1 March 2019 | Anchorage, AK | Alaska | 4 | Alaska Anchorage | 0 | |
| 167 | 2 March 2019 | Anchorage, AK | Alaska | 2 | Alaska Anchorage | 1 | |
| 168 | 25 October 2019 | Anchorage, AK | Alaska | 2 | Alaska Anchorage | 1 | |
| 169 | 26 October 2019 | Anchorage, AK | Alaska Anchorage | 4 | Alaska | 0 | |
| 170 | 28 February 2020 | Fairbanks, AK | Alaska | 5 | Alaska Anchorage | 2 | |
| 171 | 29 February 2020 | Fairbanks, AK | Alaska | 6 | Alaska Anchorage | 1 | WCHA play ends |
| 172 | 9 December 2022 | Fairbanks, AK | Alaska | 5 | Alaska Anchorage | 2 | |
| 173 | 10 December 2022 | Fairbanks, AK | Alaska | 7 | Alaska Anchorage | 2 | |
| 174 | 16 December 2022 | Anchorage, AK | Alaska | 4 | Alaska Anchorage | 0 | |
| 175 | 17 December 2022 | Anchorage, AK | Alaska | 1 | Alaska Anchorage | 0 | |
| 176 | 27 January 2023 | Anchorage, AK | Alaska | 4 | Alaska Anchorage | 3 | (OT) |
| 177 | 28 January 2023 | Fairbanks, AK | Alaska | 4 | Alaska Anchorage | 3 | (OT) |
| 178 | 3 November 2023 | Fairbanks, AK | Alaska | 6 | Alaska Anchorage | 1 | |
| 179 | 4 November 2023 | Fairbanks, AK | Alaska | 5 | Alaska Anchorage | 4 | |
| 180 | 1 December 2023 | Anchorage, AK | Alaska | 5 | Alaska Anchorage | 0 | |
| 181 | 2 December 2023 | Anchorage, AK | Alaska | 3 | Alaska Anchorage | 1 | |
| 182 | 13 January 2024 | Fairbanks, AK | Tie | 2 | Tie | 2 | (OT) |
| 183 | 3 February 2024 | Anchorage, AK | Alaska Anchorage | 4 | Alaska | 2 | |
Series: Alaska leads 88–82–13

== Series facts ==
| Statistic | Alaska | Alaska Anchorage |
|---|---|---|
| Games played | 183 | |
| Wins | 88 | 82 |
| Home wins | 51 | 45 |
| Road wins | 37 | 37 |
| Neutral site wins | 0 | 0 |
| Goals scored | 641 | 661 |
| Most goals scored in a game by one team | 9 (16 February 1990) | 10 (21 November 1980, 27 January 1990) |
| Most goals in a game by both teams | 15 (4 times) | |
| Fewest goals in a game by both teams | 1 (27 February 2009, 6 March 2015, 17 December 2022) | |
| Fewest goals scored in a game by one team in a win | 1 (6 March 2015, 17 December 2022) | 1 (27 February 2009) |
| Most goals scored in a game by one team in a loss | 6 (30 January 1981, 22 October 1993) | 7 (23 February 1985) |
| Largest margin of victory | 6 (23 October 2004) | 8 (22 November 1980) |
| Longest winning streak | 12 (28 February 2020 – 2 December 2023) | 8 (21 November 1980 – 28 February 1981) |
| Longest unbeaten streak | 13 (28 February 2020 – 13 January 2024) | 10 (20 October 2006 – 28 February 2009) |
