= Carlson Center =

Arena in Fairbanks, Alaska, US

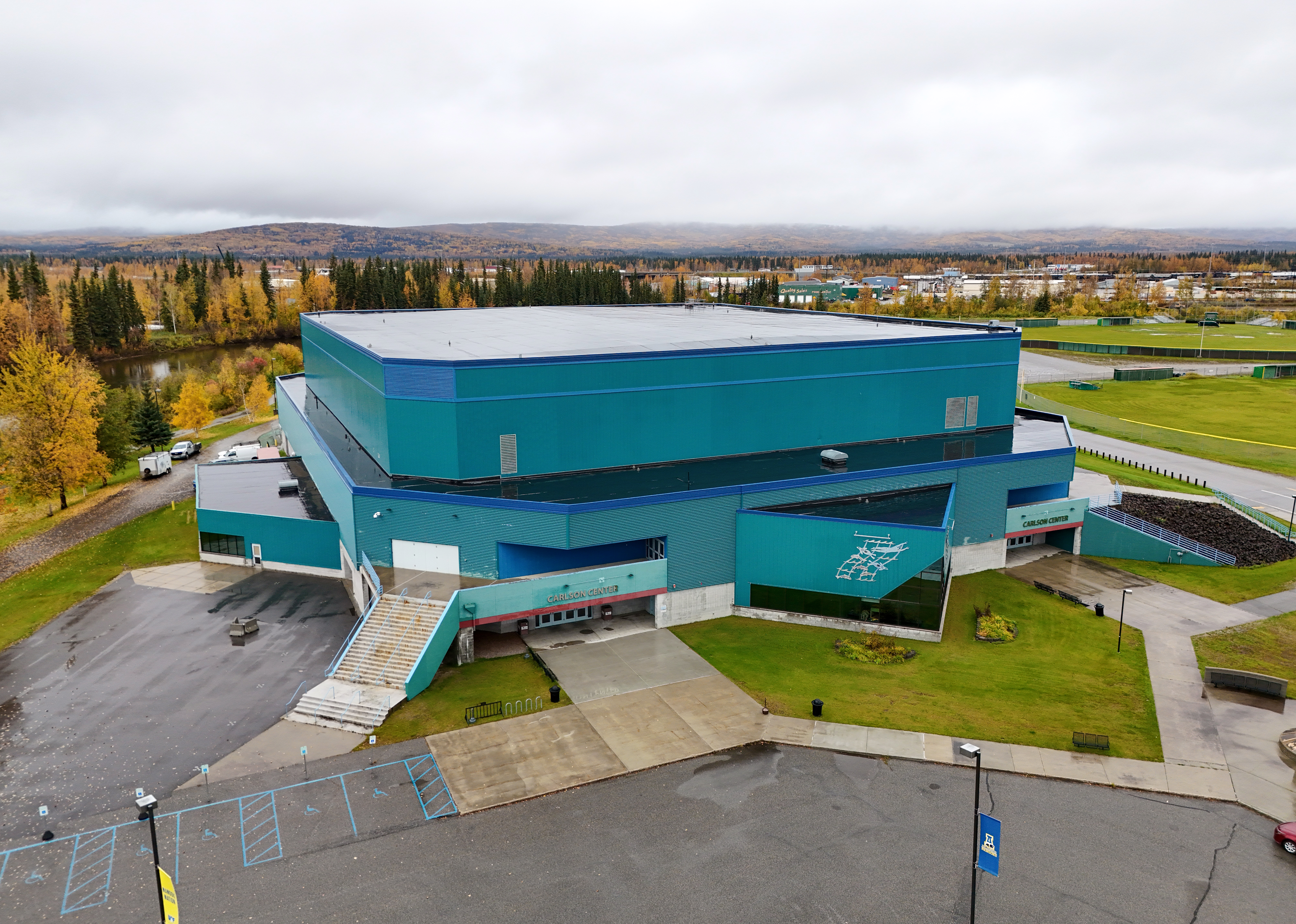
- Interactive map of Carlson Center
- Location: 2010 Second Avenue; Fairbanks, Alaska 99701
- Coordinates: 64°50′32.08″N 147°45′50.69″W
- Owner: Fairbanks North Star Borough
- Operator: FNSB
- Capacity: 5,100 (permanent seats); 5,703 (expanded for basketball); 6,539 (with added floor seats)
- Surface: 200' x 85' (hockey)

Construction
- Opened: June 13, 1990

Tenants
- Alaska Nanooks (NCAA) (1990–present); Fairbanks Grizzlies (Intense/IFL) (2008–2011)

The Carlson Center is a 5,100-seat multi-purpose arena in Fairbanks, Alaska, United States. It is the second largest arena in Alaska by seating capacity after the Sullivan Arena in Anchorage. It is home to the University of Alaska Fairbanks Nanooks ice hockey team and also serves as the site for the university's commencement exercises as well as graduation ceremonies for Lathrop, West Valley, and North Pole High Schools. The building served as the site for the Top Of The World preseason college basketball tournament until its demise in 2007. Opening in 1990, the venue is named after John A. Carlson (1920–1988), who served as Fairbanks North Star Borough mayor from 1968 to 1982.

The facility is located on the banks of the Chena River near Growden Memorial Park. It is owned by the Fairbanks North Star Borough and managed by Terrell Echols of Fairbanks North Star Borough.

== History ==
The Carlson Center opened on June 13, 1990. It serves as Interior Alaska's largest event facility and only facility in the Interior with tradeshow decorating capabilities. It is host to many events ranging from concerts and tradeshows to small meetings, conventions, and receptions. The Carlson Center also has its own catering department. The World Eskimo Indian Olympics have been held at the Center since 2008.

Past events held at the Carlson Center have included David Copperfield, Lord of the Dance, Larry the Cable Guy, Foo Fighters, Godsmack, Toby Keith, Montgomery Gentry, Don Henley, the Harlem Globetrotters, Sesame Street Live, Trace Adkins, Elton John, and Cheech & Chong, among others.

In February 2020, the Carlson Center gained international attention by hosting the first ever Alaska ComiCon, featuring guests such as the original Red Power Ranger Austin St. John, voice actor Grey DeLisle, WWE Hall-Of-Famer Rikishi, Archie Comics artist Dan Parent, and academic experts Dr. Herb Fondevilla from Japan and Dr. N. Scott Robinson from San Diego.
