= Avis Alaska Sports Complex =

Sports complex for ice hockey teams

- Interactive map of Avis Alaska Sports Complex
- Former names: UAA Sports Center; Wells Fargo Sports Complex; Seawolf Sports Complex
- Location: Anchorage, Alaska
- Coordinates: 61°11′24″N 149°49′40″W
- Owner: University of Alaska Anchorage
- Capacity: 800 (hockey)

Construction
- Opened: 1978

Tenant
- Alaska Anchorage Seawolves men's ice hockey (1979–1983, 2019–present)

The Avis Alaska Sports Complex (Note: Formerly UAA Sports Center, Wells Fargo Sports Complex, and Seawolf Sports Complex) is a multi-purpose complex on the campus of the University of Alaska Anchorage in Anchorage, Alaska. Its ice arena, named the Chuck Homan Ice Rink, seats 800 and is the current home of the Alaska Anchorage Seawolves men's ice hockey team.

The facility was built in 1978 and hosted the Seawolves hockey team from its first season in 1979 through 1983. Between 1983 and 2019, the team played at the 6,300-seat Sullivan Arena in midtown Anchorage, but continued to practice at the complex. The Seawolves moved games back to campus beginning in the 2019–20 season due to budget cuts. In June 2019, the name of the complex was changed to the Seawolf Sports Complex after UAA's contract with Wells Fargo ended.

In addition to the ice rink, the complex also has a gym, swimming pool, two fitness centers, and a dance studio.
