= 2025–26 NCAA Division I independent men's ice hockey season =

2025–26 NCAA Division I Independent men's ice hockey season
- Season: 2025–26
- Conference: NCAA Division I Independent
- Division: Division I
- Sport: men's ice hockey
- Duration: October 3, 2025– March 7, 2026
- Number of teams: 5

United Collegiate Hockey Cup
- Tournament champions: Alaska
- Runners-up: Lindenwood
- Tournament MVP: Lassi Lehti

NCAA tournament

The 2025–26 NCAA Division I Independent men's ice hockey season was the 132nd season of play for varsity ice hockey in the United States. The season began on October 3, 2025, and the inaugural United Collegiate Hockey Cup concluded on March 7, 2026.

== Coaches ==
- For the second straight season, Lindenwood hired a new head coach with Keith Fisher replacing Bill Muckalt.
- After five seasons, Brett Riley left Long Island and was replaced by his cousin, Brendan Riley.

=== Records ===
Team	Head coach	Season at school*	Record at school*
Alaska	Erik Largen	7	93–92–21
Alaska Anchorage	Matt Shasby	4	29–59–8
Lindenwood	Keith Fisher	1	0–0–0
Long Island	Brendan Riley	1	0–0–0
Stonehill	David Berard	2	12–22–0

== Standings ==
2025–26 NCAA Division I Independent ice hockey standings
	Overall record					
	GP	W	L	T	GF	GA
Alaska*	33	15	15	3	96	99
Alaska Anchorage	33	5	27	1	57	134
Lindenwood	30	15	15	0	105	114
Long Island	33	14	18	1	105	112
Stonehill	35	10	22	3	88	118
Championship: March 7, 2026 * indicates tournament champion Rankings: USCHO.com Top 20 Poll

== Ranking ==
=== USCHO ===
Team	Pre	1	2	3	4	5	6	7	8	9	10	12	13	14	15	16	17	18	19	20	21	22	23	24	25	Final
Alaska	–	–	–	–	–	–	–	–	–	–	–	–	–	–	–	–	–	–	–	–	–	–	–	–	–	–
Alaska Anchorage	–	–	–	–	–	–	–	–	–	–	–	–	–	–	–	–	–	–	–	–	–	–	–	–	–	–
Lindenwood	–	–	–	–	–	–	–	–	–	–	–	–	–	–	–	–	–	–	–	–	–	–	–	–	–	–
Long Island	–	–	–	–	–	–	–	–	–	–	–	–	–	–	–	–	–	–	–	–	–	–	–	–	–	–
Stonehill	–	–	–	–	–	–	–	–	–	–	–	–	–	–	–	–	–	–	–	–	–	–	–	–	–	–

Note: USCHO did not release a poll in week 12 or 26.

=== USA Hockey ===
Team	Pre	1	2	3	4	5	6	7	8	9	10	11	13	14	15	16	17	18	19	20	21	22	23	24	25	26	Final
Alaska	–	–	–	–	–	–	–	–	–	–	–	–	–	–	–	–	–	–	–	–	–	–	–	–	–	–	–
Alaska Anchorage	–	–	–	–	–	–	–	–	–	–	–	–	–	–	–	–	–	–	–	–	–	–	–	–	–	–	–
Lindenwood	–	–	–	–	–	–	–	–	–	–	–	–	–	–	–	–	–	–	–	–	–	–	–	–	–	–	–
Long Island	–	–	–	–	–	–	–	–	–	–	–	–	–	–	–	–	–	–	–	–	–	–	–	–	–	–	–
Stonehill	–	–	–	–	–	–	–	–	–	–	–	–	–	–	–	–	–	–	–	–	–	–	–	–	–	–	–

Note: USA Hockey did not release a poll in week 12.

=== NPI ===
Team	1	2	3	4	5	6	7	8	9	10	11	13	14	15	16	17	18	19	20	21	22	23	24	Final
Alaska	–	–	35	–	–	50	53	53	45	43	47	46	47	48	49	45	43	42	36	36	35	–	–	–
Alaska Anchorage	–	–	56	–	–	59	51	55	55	59	59	58	59	58	61	61	61	60	61	62	62	–	–	–
Lindenwood	–	–	18	–	–	16	23	16	19	17	27	37	43	36	36	37	35	40	38	39	37	–	–	–
Long Island	–	–	37	–	–	14	15	32	29	26	36	44	41	39	30	36	33	35	45	44	43	–	–	–
Stonehill	–	–	48	–	–	61	61	61	60	60	60	57	58	60	59	59	59	59	58	58	57	–	–	–

Note: teams ranked in the top-10 automatically qualify for the NCAA tournament. Teams ranked 11-16 can qualify based upon conference tournament results.

== Awards ==
=== ACHA ===
Award	Recipient
Player of the Year	Giovanni Morneau, Lindenwood
Defenseman of the Year	Evan Orr, Stonehill
Defenseman of the Year	Nolan Seed, Lindenwood
Goaltender of the Year	Lassi Lehti, Alaska
Rookie of the Year	Giovanni Morneau, Lindenwood
Coach of the Year	Erik Largen, Alaska
Most Valuable Player in Tournament	Lassi Lehti, Alaska
All Independent Team
First Team	Position
Lassi Lehti, Alaska	G
Nick Bernardo, Long Island	D
Evan Orr, Stonehill	D
Nolan Seed, Lindenwood	D
Mike Citara, Alaska	F
Giovanni Morneau, Lindenwood	F
Matt Romer, Stonehill	F
Brett Rylance, Long Island	F
