= List of Lindenwood Lions men's ice hockey seasons =

This is a list of seasons completed by the Lindenwood University men's ice hockey team. The list documents the season-by-season records of the Lions from the team's promotion to Division I in 2022 to present, including postseason results.

== Season-by-season results ==
Note: GP = Games played, W = Wins, L = Losses, T = Ties

NCAA D-I Champions	NCAA Frozen Four	Conference Regular Season Champions	Conference Playoff Champions

Season	Conference	Regular Season (Note: Code explanation; GP—Games Played, W—Wins, L—Losses, T—Tied games, Pts—Points*)											Conference Tournament Results	National Tournament Results
Season	Conference	Conference						Overall					Conference Tournament Results	National Tournament Results
Season	Conference	GP	W	L	T	Pts*	Finish	GP	W	L	T	%	Conference Tournament Results	National Tournament Results
Division I
Rick Zombo (2022—2024)
2022–23	Independent	—	—	—	—	—	—	30	7	22	1	.250		
2023–24	Independent	—	—	—	—	—	—	28	6	18	4	.286		
Bill Muckalt (2024—2025)
2024–25	Independent	—	—	—	—	—	—	32	8	22	2	.281		
Keith Fisher (2025—present)
2025–26	Independent	—	—	—	—	—	—	30	15	15	0	.500	Won UCHC Semifinal, 4–3 (Long Island); Lost UCHC Championship, 3–4 (OT) (Alaska)	
Totals								GP	W	L	T	%	Championships	
Regular Season								118	35	76	7	.326		
Conference Post-season								2	1	1	0	.500		
NCAA Post-season								0	0	0	0	–		
Regular Season and Post-season Record								120	36	77	7	.329		

* Winning percentage is used when conference schedules are unbalanced.
