= 2025–26 Lindenwood Lions men's ice hockey season =

- Conference: Independent
- Home ice: Centene Community Ice Center

Rankings
- USCHO: NR
- USA Hockey: NR

Record
- Overall: 15–15–0
- Home: 9–9–0
- Road: 6–6–0

Coaches and captains
- Head coach: Keith Fisher
- Assistant coaches: Jack Combs; Andrew Magera; Mark Abney
- Captain: Drew Kuzma
- Alternate captain(s): Jake Southgate; Ethan Zielke

The 2025–26 Lindenwood Lions men's ice hockey season was the 4th season of varsity play for the program. The Lions represented Lindenwood University in the 2025–26 NCAA Division I men's ice hockey season, played their games at the Centene Community Ice Center and were coached by Keith Fisher in his 1st season.

== Season ==
When Bill Muckalt announced that he was leaving after just one season as head coach, Lindenwood was left scrambling. The school responded quickly by hiring Penn State associate head coach Keith Fisher to fill the role as well as replenish a roster that had been denuded by transfers and graduation. With so much uncertainty going into the season, there was little reason to expect any level of success for the Lions.

At the dawn of the campaign, the team was hoping that Minnesota Duluth transfer Klayton Knapp would be able to hold the fort in goal and allow the many new faces to coalesce into a respectable unit. Unfortunately, things did not work out as planned. In the first month of the season, neither Knapp nor freshman Liam Beerman seemed able to keep the puck out of the goal. Fortunately for Lindenwood, the offense quickly got under way and stopped the season from slipping away. While the Lions were shutout twice in the first four weeks, they still managed 19 goals in 8 games and even managed to get one over on #5 Denver. Further helping their cause, after a pair of overtime losses to Miami, Beerman got used to the college game and started providing credible goaltending for the team. Beginning with a 1–0 shutout of Ferris State, Lindenwood won five games in a row, the best stretch of games in the short history of the program. Their positive record and relatively high strength of schedule had the Lions flirting with a potential NCAA tournament berth by the end of November.

The team had a chance to establish itself for postseason play with two series around the holiday break. Four games against Maine and Minnesota Duluth would go a long way to determine how the Lindenwood's season would finish. Unfortunately, goaltending failed them during that stretch. In those matches, the two Lion netminders surrendered 26 goals and gave the team almost no chance to win no matter how well the offense performed. By the time they pulled out of their tailspin, Lindenwood had dropped from 17 in the NPI to 43 and had virtually no chance at making the tournament. Inconsistent play in goal dogged the team for the remainder of the year but the Lions were still able to ride the hot hand of their offense, which averaged 3.5 goals per game for the season, to an even record.

After finishing up their schedule, Lindenwood hosted the inaugural United Collegiate Hockey Cup, a tournament for all active independent programs. They ended up in a see-saw battle with Long Island that twice saw the Sharks tying the game. However, with just 8 seconds left in the match, Anselmo Rego scored the winning goal and sent the Lions to the championship game. Playing before their home crowd with a chance not only to win a title but produce their first winning season, Lindenwood faced Alaska in the final game of the season. The offense was sluggish over the first two periods and after 40 minutes, the Lions found themselves behind by 2 goals. The team responded by throwing everything they could on goal and ended up with 23 shots in the third. The heavy pressure led to a pair of goals and Jacob Fletcher tied the score with under 3 minutes to play. While momentum was on their side as regulation ended, a mistake early in overtime proved disastrous. After a rush towards Beerman was broken up, Lindenwood got ahold of the puck behind the net. An ensuing pass up the ice was intercepted and quickly deposited into the Lions' cage, ending the season in heartbreaking fashion. Despite the sour end, this was still the bet season that Lindenwood had produced in its short history.

== Departures ==
Player	Position	Nationality	Cause
Mitch Allard	Forward	United States	Graduation (signed with Kansas City Mavericks)
Jack Anderson	Defenseman	United States	Transferred to Michigan Tech
Alexandros Aslanidis	Goaltender	United States	Graduation (signed with Kansas City Mavericks)
Owen Bartoszkiewicz	Goaltender	United States	Transferred to Michigan Tech
Artyom Borshyov	Defenseman	Belarus	Graduation (signed with Rapid City Rush)
Ryan Forberg	Forward	Canada	Transferred to Geneseo State
David Gagnon	Forward	Canada	Graduation (signed with Rapid City Rush)
Henry Graham	Goaltender	United States	Graduation (signed with Monroe Moccasins)
Noah Houle	Defenseman	Canada	Transferred to Clarkson
Thomas Jarman	Defenseman	United States	Graduation (retired)
Alexander Lundman	Forward	Sweden	Graduation (signed with HC Vita Hästen)
Kristóf Papp	Forward	Hungary	Graduation (signed with Iowa Heartlanders)
Joe Prouty	Defenseman	Canada	Transferred to Michigan Tech
Shawn Ramsey	Defenseman	Canada	Transferred to Western Ontario
Jacob Vockler	Forward	United States	Transferred to Arizona
Coltan Wilkie	Forward	United States	Signed professional contract (Fayetteville Marksmen)
Aiden Yakimchuk	Defenseman	Canada	Graduate transfer to Alberta

== Recruiting ==
Player	Position	Nationality	Age	Notes
Liam Beerman	Goaltender	United States	21	Marquette, MI
Michael Bevilacqua	Defenseman	United States	22	Hamburg, NY; transfer from Bowling Green
Jacob Delaney	Defenseman	United States	21	Glen Ellyn, IL
Ethan Elias	Defenseman	United States	22	Maple Grove, MN; transfer from St. Thomas
Jacob Fletcher	Forward	Canada	21	Midland, ON
Louis-Philippe Fontaine	Forward	Canada	21	Chambly, QC
Connor Gengle	Defenseman	United States	20	Grand Rapids, MI
Olivier Houde	Forward	Canada	21	Dosquet, QC
Klayton Knapp	Goaltender	United States	21	Sylvania, OH; transfer from Minnesota Duluth
Brady McIsaac	Forward	Canada	20	Prince George, BC
Giovanni Morneau	Forward	Canada	22	Ottawa, ON; transfer from Carleton
Brody Mortensen	Defenseman	Canada	20	Humboldt, SK
Anselmo Rego	Forward	Canada	20	Brampton, ON
Charles Savoie	Forward	Canada	22	Saint-Eustache, QC
Nolan Seed	Forward	Canada	23	Newboro, ON; transfer from Carleton
Will Winemaster	Forward	United States	21	Chicago, IL
Jonathan Wong	Defenseman	Canada	20	North Vancouver, BC

== Roster ==
As of August 24, 2025.

No.	Nat.	Player	Class	Pos	Height	Weight	DoB	Hometown	Previous team	NHL rights
3	(Canada)	Jonathan Wong	Freshman	D	5' 9" (1.75 m)	161 lb (73 kg)	2004-12-08	North Vancouver, British Columbia	Alberni Valley Bulldogs (BCHL)	—
4	(United States)	Connor Gengle	Freshman	D	5' 9" (1.75 m)	150 lb (68 kg)	2005-02-16	Grand Rapids, Michigan	Sherwood Park Crusaders (BCHL)	—
5	(United States)	Will Winemaster	Freshman	D	6' 3" (1.91 m)	205 lb (93 kg)	2003-11-17	Chicago, Illinois	Charlotte Rush (USPHL)	—
6	(Canada)	Giovanni Morneau	Sophomore	D	5' 9" (1.75 m)	168 lb (76 kg)	2003-06-17	Ottawa, Ontario	Carleton (OUA)	—
7	(United States)	Brady Yakesh	Sophomore	D	5' 9" (1.75 m)	179 lb (81 kg)	2003-09-15	Delano, Minnesota	Cowichan Valley Capitals (BCHL)	—
8	(United States)	Jacob Delaney	Freshman	D	6' 2" (1.88 m)	218 lb (99 kg)	2004-09-16	Glen Ellyn, Illinois	Sioux City Musketeers (USHL)	—
9	(Canada)	Drew Kuzma (C)	Senior	F	6' 6" (1.98 m)	210 lb (95 kg)	2002-11-13	St. Albert, Alberta	Flin Flon Bombers (SJHL)	—
10	(United States)	Jacob Fletcher	Freshman	F	5' 9" (1.75 m)	170 lb (77 kg)	2004-07-28	Midland, Ontario	Cranbrook Bucks (BCHL)	—
11	(Canada)	Charles Savoie	Sophomore	F	6' 2" (1.88 m)	168 lb (76 kg)	2003-01-14	Saint-Eustache, Quebec	Concordia (OUA)	—
12	(Canada)	Ethan Zielke (A)	Junior	D	5' 10" (1.78 m)	180 lb (82 kg)	2003-08-03	Calgary, Alberta	Humboldt Broncos (SJHL)	—
13	(Canada)	Adam Raesler	Sophomore	F	6' 0" (1.83 m)	165 lb (75 kg)	2003-06-23	Edmonton, Alberta	Sherwood Park Crusaders (BCHL)	—
14	(Canada)	John Evans	Junior	F	5' 10" (1.78 m)	150 lb (68 kg)	2002-04-08	South Surrey, British Columbia	Rensselaer (ECAC)	—
15	(United States)	Michael Bevilacqua	Junior	D	6' 0" (1.83 m)	187 lb (85 kg)	2003-01-26	Hamburg, New York	Bowling Green (CCHA)	—
16	(Canada)	Anselmo Rego	Freshman	F	5' 9" (1.75 m)	176 lb (80 kg)	2005-06-01	Brampton, Ontario	Penticton Vees (BCHL)	—
17	(United States)	Patrick Schmiedlin	Junior	F	6' 1" (1.85 m)	185 lb (84 kg)	2002-03-20	Culver, Indiana	Maine Nordiques (NAHL)	—
18	(United States)	Ethan Elias	Sophomore	D	5' 8" (1.73 m)	187 lb (85 kg)	2003-04-03	Maple Grove, Minnesota	St. Thomas (CCHA)	—
19	(Canada)	Louis-Philippe Fontaine	Freshman	F	5' 9" (1.75 m)	203 lb (92 kg)	2004-08-12	Chambly, Quebec	Shawinigan Cataractes (QMJHL)	—
20	(Canada)	Ty Hipkin	Sophomore	F	5' 11" (1.8 m)	181 lb (82 kg)	2000-03-31	High River, Alberta	Calgary Canucks (AJHL)	—
21	(Canada)	Jake Southgate (A)	Junior	F	5' 11" (1.8 m)	185 lb (84 kg)	2002-11-04	North Battleford, Saskatchewan	Battlefords North Stars (SJHL)	—
22	(Canada)	Olivier Houde	Freshman	F	6' 1" (1.85 m)	181 lb (82 kg)	2004-01-02	Dosquet, Quebec	Victoriaville Tigres (QMJHL)	—
23	(Canada)	Jaeden Mercier	Junior	F	5' 11" (1.8 m)	170 lb (77 kg)	2002-02-12	Saskatoon, Saskatchewan	Flin Flon Bombers (SJHL)	—
24	(United States)	Nolan Seed	Junior	D	5' 11" (1.8 m)	168 lb (76 kg)	2002-04-24	Newboro, Ontario	Carleton (OUA)	—
26	(United States)	Tyler Loughman	Sophomore	F	5' 11" (1.8 m)	174 lb (79 kg)	2003-11-04	St. Louis, Missouri	Canmore Eagles (AJHL)	—
27	(United States)	Brady McIsaac	Freshman	F	5' 9" (1.75 m)	165 lb (75 kg)	2004-12-16	Prince George, British Columbia	Alberni Valley Bulldogs (BCHL)	—
28	(Canada)	Brody Mortensen	Sophomore	D	6' 1" (1.85 m)	185 lb (84 kg)	2004-09-07	Humboldt, Saskatchewan	Canmore Eagles (AJHL)	—
29	(United States)	Colin Ronan	Sophomore	G	6' 2" (1.88 m)	190 lb (86 kg)	2003-06-06	Saugus, Massachusetts	Maryland Black Bears (NAHL)	—
31	(United States)	Klayton Knapp	Sophomore	G	6' 0" (1.83 m)	190 lb (86 kg)	2003-10-07	Sylvania, Ohio	Minnesota Duluth (NCHC)	—
35	(United States)	Liam Beerman	Freshman	G	6' 0" (1.83 m)	165 lb (75 kg)	2004-09-30	Marquette, Michigan	Dubuque Fighting Saints (USHL)	—

== Standings ==
2025–26 NCAA Division I Independent ice hockey standings
	Overall record					
	GP	W	L	T	GF	GA
Alaska*	33	15	15	3	96	99
Alaska Anchorage	33	5	27	1	57	134
Lindenwood	30	15	15	0	105	114
Long Island	33	14	18	1	105	112
Stonehill	35	10	22	3	88	118
Championship: March 7, 2026 * indicates tournament champion Rankings: USCHO.com Top 20 Poll

== Schedule and results ==
Date	Time	Opponent^{#}	Rank^{#}	Site	TV	Decision	Result	Attendance	Record
Regular Season
October 3	7:10 pm	#20 Wisconsin*		Centene Community Ice Center • St. Charles, Missouri		Knapp	L 0–3	2,001	0–1–0
October 4	7:10 pm	#20 Wisconsin*		Centene Community Ice Center • St. Charles, Missouri		Knapp	L 2–7	2,152	0–2–0
October 10	6:07 pm	at Lake Superior State*		Taffy Abel Arena • Sault Ste. Marie, Michigan	Midco Sports+	Knapp	W 7–4	—	1–2–0
October 11	5:07 pm	at Lake Superior State*		Taffy Abel Arena • Sault Ste. Marie, Michigan	Midco Sports+	Beerman	W 5–4	2,000	2–2–0
October 17	7:10 pm	#5 Denver*		Centene Community Ice Center • St. Charles, Missouri		Knapp	W 4–3	1,888	3–2–0
October 18	7:10 pm	#5 Denver*		Centene Community Ice Center • St. Charles, Missouri		Knapp	L 0–4	2,079	3–3–0
October 24	7:10 pm	Miami*		Centene Community Ice Center • St. Charles, Missouri		Knapp	L 4–5 ^{OT}	1,586	3–4–0
October 25	7:10 pm	Miami*		Centene Community Ice Center • St. Charles, Missouri		Beerman	L 4–5 ^{OT}	1,443	3–5–0
October 31	6:07 pm	at Ferris State*		Ewigleben Arena • Big Rapids, Michigan	Midco Sports+	Beerman	W 1–0	1,620	4–5–0
November 1	5:07 pm	at Ferris State*		Ewigleben Arena • Big Rapids, Michigan	Midco Sports+	Beerman	W 3–2	1,710	5–5–0
November 14	7:10 pm	Grand Canyon*		Centene Community Ice Center • St. Charles, Missouri (Exhibition)		Ronan	W 7–2	572	
November 15	7:30 pm	Grand Canyon*		Centene Community Ice Center • St. Charles, Missouri (Exhibition)		Beerman	W 10–0	771	
November 21	7:10 pm	Robert Morris*		Centene Community Ice Center • St. Charles, Missouri		Beerman	W 6–2	1,416	6–5–0
November 22	6:10 pm	Robert Morris*		Centene Community Ice Center • St. Charles, Missouri		Knapp	W 5–3	1,489	7–5–0
November 28	7:40 pm	Long Island*		Centene Community Ice Center • St. Charles, Missouri		Beerman	W 5–2	901	8–5–0
November 29	6:10 pm	Long Island*		Centene Community Ice Center • St. Charles, Missouri		Knapp	L 2–5	894	8–6–0
December 13	5:30 pm	at #15 Maine*		Alfond Arena • Orono, Maine	ESPN+	Beerman	L 0–5	4,980	8–7–0
December 14	3:30 pm	at #15 Maine*		Alfond Arena • Orono, Maine	ESPN+	Knapp	L 2–7	4,842	8–8–0
January 2	7:30 pm	Canisius*		Centene Community Ice Center • St. Charles, Missouri		Beerman	W 5–2	904	9–8–0
January 3	3:30 pm	Canisius*		Centene Community Ice Center • St. Charles, Missouri		Beerman	L 3–4	887	9–9–0
January 9	7:07 pm	at #5 Minnesota Duluth*		AMSOIL Arena • Duluth, Minnesota	My9	Knapp	L 3–6	4,257	9–10–0
January 10	6:07 pm	at #5 Minnesota Duluth*		AMSOIL Arena • Duluth, Minnesota	My9	Beerman	L 4–8	4,198	9–11–0
January 16	7:10 pm	Stonehill*		Centene Community Ice Center • St. Charles, Missouri		Knapp	W 6–2	962	10–11–0
January 17	7:10 pm	Stonehill*		Centene Community Ice Center • St. Charles, Missouri		Knapp	W 5–1	937	11–11–0
January 23	10:07 pm	at Alaska*		Carlson Center • Fairbanks, Alaska	FloHockey	Knapp	L 2–5	1,663	11–12–0
January 24	10:07 pm	at Alaska*		Carlson Center • Fairbanks, Alaska	FloHockey	Beerman	W 7–4	1,792	12–12–0
February 6	6:00 pm	at Stonehill*		Warrior Ice Arena • Boston, Massachusetts	NEC Front Row	Beerman	W 3–1	194	13–12–0
February 7	6:00 pm	at Stonehill*		Warrior Ice Arena • Boston, Massachusetts	NEC Front Row	Beerman	L 1–5	189	13–13–0
February 13	7:10 pm	Alaska Anchorage*		Centene Community Ice Center • St. Charles, Missouri	FloHockey	Knapp	L 4–5	936	13–14–0
February 14	6:10 pm	Alaska Anchorage*		Centene Community Ice Center • St. Charles, Missouri	FloHockey	Beerman	W 4–2	1,020	14–14–0
February 21	7:10 pm	USNTDP*		Centene Community Ice Center • St. Charles, Missouri (Exhibition)	FloHockey		L 3–6		
February 22	2:10 pm	USNTDP*		Centene Community Ice Center • St. Charles, Missouri (Exhibition)	FloHockey		W 9–4		
United Collegiate Hockey Cup
March 5	7:00 pm	Long Island*		Centene Community Ice Center • St. Charles, Missouri (UCHC Semifinal)	FloHockey	Beerman	W 5–4	1,020	15–14–0
March 7	7:00 pm	Alaska*		Centene Community Ice Center • St. Charles, Missouri (UCHC Championship)	FloHockey	Beerman	L 3–4 ^{OT}	1,023	15–15–0
*Non-conference game. ^{#}Rankings from USCHO.com Poll. All times are in Central Time. Source:

== Scoring statistics ==
Name	Position	Games	Goals	Assists	Points	PIM
Giovanni Morneau	C	30	10	21	31	6
Olivier Houde	C	30	13	15	28	26
Charles Savoie	LW	30	9	18	27	54
Jacob Fletcher	F	28	14	11	25	8
Jake Southgate	C	30	8	16	24	18
Nolan Seed	D	30	3	19	22	16
Louis-Philippe Fontaine	C	30	10	11	21	12
Ethan Elias	D	30	1	14	15	26
Michael Bevilacqua	D	26	6	8	14	4
Anselmo Rego	F	25	7	5	12	2
Adam Raesler	F	27	5	5	10	19
Ethan Zielke	F	27	2	8	10	16
Drew Kuzma	F	29	4	4	8	16
Jaeden Mercier	F	29	3	5	8	4
Jacob Delaney	D	24	3	4	7	12
Tyler Loughman	F	29	0	7	7	26
Brady McIsaac	F	21	2	3	5	4
Connor Gengle	D	30	2	3	5	6
Brody Mortensen	D	22	2	2	4	23
Ty Hipkin	F	17	1	2	3	8
Brady Yakesh	D	20	0	2	2	4
Klayton Knapp	G	15	0	1	1	0
Colin Ronan	G	2	0	0	0	0
John Evans	F	3	0	0	0	0
Jonathan Wong	D	5	0	0	0	0
Patrick Schmiedlin	C	6	0	0	0	0
Liam Beerman	G	16	0	0	0	0
Total			105	183	288	324

== Goaltending statistics ==
Name	Games	Minutes	Wins	Losses	Ties	Goals Against	Saves	Shut Outs	SV %	GAA
Colin Ronan	1	5:09	0	0	0	0	2	0	1.000	0.00
Liam Beerman	16	925:17	10	6	0	50	467	1	.903	3.24
Klayton Knapp	15	867:18	5	9	0	63	459	0	.879	4.36
Empty Net	-	06:43	-	-	-	1	-	-	-	-
Total	30	1804:27	15	15	0	114	928	1	.891	3.79

== Rankings ==
Poll	Week																											
Poll	Pre	1	2	3	4	5	6	7	8	9	10	11	12	13	14	15	16	17	18	19	20	21	22	23	24	25	26	27 (Final)
USCHO.com	NR	NR	NR	RV	NR	NR	NR	NR	NR	NR	NR	NR	–	NR	NR	NR	NR	NR	NR	NR	NR	NR	NR	NR	NR	NR	NR	NR
USA Hockey	NR	NR	NR	NR	NR	NR	NR	NR	NR	NR	NR	NR	–	NR	NR	NR	NR	NR	NR	NR	NR	NR	NR	NR	NR	NR	NR	NR

Note: USCHO did not release a poll in week 12.
Note: USA Hockey did not release a poll in week 12.
