= 2025–26 Stonehill Skyhawks men's ice hockey season =

- Conference: Independent
- Home ice: Warrior Ice Arena; Bridgewater Ice Arena

Rankings
- USCHO: NR
- USA Hockey: NR

Record
- Overall: 10–22–3
- Home: 4–8–0
- Road: 5–13–2
- Neutral: 1–1–1

Coaches and captains
- Head coach: David Berard
- Assistant coaches: Brian Rigali; Cam MacDonald
- Captain(s): Frank Ireland; Evan Orr
- Alternate captain(s): Zachary Aben; Connor Androlewicz

The 2025–26 Stonehill Skyhawks men's ice hockey season was the 47th season of play for the program and 4th at the Division I level. The Skyhawks represented Stonehill College in the 2025–26 NCAA Division I men's ice hockey season, played their home games at the Warrior Ice Arena and were coached by David Berard in his 2nd season.

== Season ==
Stonehill's season got off to a rocky start. While the offense wasn't particular good, it was consistently providing a minimal level of scoring. Connor Androlewicz, the team's primary starter, had several decent outing but he was unable to hold opponents to the 1 goal or fewer mark in order to get a win. Only twice in Androlewicz's first 14 starts did the Skyhawks score three goals and, coincidentally, those were the only two games they did not lose. It wasn't until December that the offense finally picked up its pace but even then goal scoring was only intermittent. The modest improvement was enough for Stonehill to post an 8–8–1 record to finish out the year, though part of that could be attributed to an easier slate of games. Of all 10 wins the Skyhawks had on the season, Sacred Heart was the only team they could defeat who was ranked in the top half of the NPI.

The capstone for the team's season came in the inaugural United Collegiate Hockey Cup. The Skyhawks kicked off the tournament by winning the first game in decisive fashion and advancing to the semifinal. They twice overcame 2-goal deficits against Alaska and took a lead deep into the third period, only to see the Nanooks tie the match with 1.2 seconds remaining. After a scoreless overtime, a shootout was used to decide the match. Unfortunately, Stonehill missed on all four of their opportunities and Alaska was able to take the game. The following day, the team met Long Island to decide third place. While The Skyhawks were able to get a lead partway through the first period, they could not hold their advantage and eventually fell 3–4.

== Departures ==
| Player | Position | Nationality | Cause |
|---|---|---|---|
| Justin Barker | Forward | Canada | Transferred to Guelph |
| Jake Cady | Forward | United States | Graduation (retired) |
| Gavin FitzPatrick | Goaltender | United States | Graduation (retired) |
| Cam Gaudette | Defenseman | United States | Graduation (signed with Pensacola Ice Flyers) |
| Hunter Hastings | Forward | United States | Transferred to Wisconsin–Stevens Point |
| Kyle Heath | Forward | United States | Graduation (retired) |
| Jake LaRusso | Forward | United States | Transferred to Chatham |
| Cam Mannion | Defenseman | United States | Graduation (retired) |
| Devlin O'Brien | Forward | Canada | Graduation (retired) |
| Riley Rosenthal | Defenseman | United States | Transferred to Colby |
| Conor Ronayne | Forward | United States | Transferred to Aurora |
| Henri Schreifels | Forward | United States | Graduation (signed with Wheeling Nailers) |
| Alexander Tertyshny | Defenseman | United States | Graduation (signed with Chelmet Chelyabinsk) |

== Recruiting ==
| Player | Position | Nationality | Age | Notes |
|---|---|---|---|---|
| Jake Gutwirth | Forward | United States | 20 | Brooklyn, NY |
| Adam Mahler | Defenseman | United States | 21 | Ancaster, ON |
| Justin Mexico | Forward | United States | 21 | Madison Heights, MI; transfer from American International |
| Pat Murphy | Forward | United States | 19 | North Kingstown, RI |
| Jordin Palmer | Defenseman | United States | 21 | Auburn, NH |
| David Posma | Defenseman | United States | 22 | Pomona, NY; transfer from American International |
| Matthew Rafalski | Defenseman | United States | 21 | Waupaca, WI |
| Billy Renfrew | Forward | United States | 22 | Fairbanks, AK; transfer from Northern Michigan |
| Matthew Romer | Forward | United States | 23 | Carpentersville, IL; transfer from Northern Michigan |

== Roster ==
As of August 2, 2025.

| No. | Nat. | Player | Class | Pos | Height | Weight | DoB | Hometown | Previous team | NHL rights |
|---|---|---|---|---|---|---|---|---|---|---|
| 2 | (United States) | Adam Mahler | Freshman | D | 6' 2" (1.88 m) | 218 lb (99 kg) | 2004-07-25 | Ancaster, Ontario | Minot Minotauros (NAHL) | — |
| 4 | (Canada) | Charles Banquier | Junior | D | 6' 2" (1.88 m) | 200 lb (91 kg) | 2002-10-06 | Oakville, Ontario | Prince George Spruce Kings (BCHL) | — |
| 5 | (United States) | Ryan Davies | Senior | D | 5' 10" (1.78 m) | 179 lb (81 kg) | 2001-03-27 | Arlington, Massachusetts | Valley Jr. Warriors (EHL) | — |
| 6 | (United States) | Justin Gibson | Sophomore | D | 6' 1" (1.85 m) | 190 lb (86 kg) | 2003-05-29 | Pittsburgh, Pennsylvania | Johnstown Tomahawks (NAHL) | — |
| 9 | (Canada) | Brady Hunter | Junior | F | 5' 8" (1.73 m) | 174 lb (79 kg) | 2002-07-27 | Enfield, Nova Scotia | Merrimack (HEA) | — |
| 10 | (United States) | J. J. Grainda | Junior | F | 6' 3" (1.91 m) | 190 lb (86 kg) | 2002-08-01 | Carmel, Indiana | Chippewa Steel (NAHL) | — |
| 11 | (United States) | Justin Mexico | Sophomore | F | 5' 10" (1.78 m) | 165 lb (75 kg) | 2003-12-05 | Madison Heights, Michigan | American International (AHA) | — |
| 12 | (United States) | Zach Aben (A) | Sophomore | F | 5' 9" (1.75 m) | 181 lb (82 kg) | 2003-12-12 | Shavertown, Pennsylvania | Johnstown Tomahawks (NAHL) | — |
| 13 | (Canada) | Leo Chambers | Sophomore | F | 6' 1" (1.85 m) | 174 lb (79 kg) | 2003-12-22 | Toronto, Ontario | Steinbach Pistons (MJHL) | — |
| 14 | (Canada) | Cole Melady | Sophomore | F | 5' 11" (1.8 m) | 187 lb (85 kg) | 2003-07-14 | Seaforth, Ontario | Coquitlam Express (BCHL) | — |
| 15 | (United States) | Billy Renfrew | Sophomore | F | 5' 10" (1.78 m) | 181 lb (82 kg) | 2003-08-14 | Fairbanks, Alaska | Northern Michigan (CCHA) | — |
| 16 | (Finland) | Joel Lehtinen | Sophomore | F | 6' 2" (1.88 m) | 181 lb (82 kg) | 2003-11-12 | Dallas, Texas | Minot Minotauros (NAHL) | — |
| 17 | (United States) | Pat Murphy | Freshman | F | 5' 11" (1.8 m) | 176 lb (80 kg) | 2005-12-01 | North Kingstown, Rhode Island | Cranbrook Bucks (BCHL) | — |
| 18 | (United States) | Jake Gutwirth | Freshman | F | 5' 8" (1.73 m) | 165 lb (75 kg) | 2005-05-29 | Brooklyn, New York | Cowichan Valley Capitals (BCHL) | — |
| 19 | (United States) | Frank Ireland (C) | Senior | F | 5' 11" (1.8 m) | 185 lb (84 kg) | 2001-02-06 | South Easton, Massachusetts | Boston Junior Bruins (NCDC) | — |
| 20 | (United States) | David Posma | Senior | D | 6' 0" (1.83 m) | 170 lb (77 kg) | 2003-08-27 | Pomona, New York | American International (AHA) | — |
| 21 | (United States) | Devon Carlstorm | Junior | D | 6' 3" (1.91 m) | 185 lb (84 kg) | 2002-03-05 | Palm Beach Gardens, Florida | Aberdeen Wings (NAHL) | — |
| 22 | (United States) | Jordin Palmer | Freshman | D | 6' 2" (1.88 m) | 194 lb (88 kg) | 2004-01-06 | Auburn, New Hampshire | Rochester Jr. Americans (NAHL) | — |
| 24 | (United States) | Anthony Galante | Junior | F | 5' 11" (1.8 m) | 175 lb (79 kg) | 2002-04-18 | Morganville, New Jersey | Johnstown Tomahawks (NAHL) | — |
| 26 | (United States) | Evan Orr (C) | Senior | D | 5' 11" (1.8 m) | 185 lb (84 kg) | 2001-01-09 | Shelby Township, Michigan | Michigan Tech (CCHA) | — |
| 28 | (United States) | Matthew Rafalski | Freshman | D | 6' 1" (1.85 m) | 190 lb (86 kg) | 2004-06-12 | Waupaca, Wisconsin | Bismarck Bobcats (NAHL) | — |
| 29 | (United States) | Connor Androlewicz (A) | Graduate | G | 6' 2" (1.88 m) | 194 lb (88 kg) | 2000-11-28 | St. Louis, Missouri | Maine (HEA) | — |
| 30 | (United States) | Dylan Ghaemi | Senior | G | 6' 4" (1.93 m) | 200 lb (91 kg) | 2001-12-30 | Fairport, New York | Järvso (Hockeytrean) | — |
| 31 | (Latvia) | Linards Lipskis | Sophomore | G | 6' 2" (1.88 m) | 190 lb (86 kg) | 2003-07-03 | Riga, Latvia | Wisconsin Windigo (NAHL) | — |
| 34 | (United States) | Teddy Lagerbäck | Senior | F | 6' 1" (1.85 m) | 196 lb (89 kg) | 2001-08-21 | Minnetonka, Minnesota | Miami (NCHC) | — |
| 44 | (Canada) | Zach Nicolas | Sophomore | F | 6' 5" (1.96 m) | 203 lb (92 kg) | 2004-02-10 | Winnipeg, Manitoba | Winkler Flyers (MJHL) | — |
| 55 | (United States) | Dominick Campione | Junior | D | 5' 11" (1.8 m) | 154 lb (70 kg) | 2002-11-25 | Kohler, Wisconsin | Brooks Bandits (AJHL) | — |
| 71 | (United States) | Matthew Romer | Junior | F | 5' 9" (1.75 m) | 178 lb (81 kg) | 2002-09-01 | Chicago, Illinois | Northern Michigan (CCHA) | — |

== Standings ==
2025–26 NCAA Division I Independent ice hockey standings
| | Overall record | | | | | |
| | GP | W | L | T | GF | GA |
|---|---|---|---|---|---|---|
| Alaska* | 33 | 15 | 15 | 3 | 96 | 99 |
| Alaska Anchorage | 33 | 5 | 27 | 1 | 57 | 134 |
| Lindenwood | 30 | 15 | 15 | 0 | 105 | 114 |
| Long Island | 33 | 14 | 18 | 1 | 105 | 112 |
| Stonehill | 35 | 10 | 22 | 3 | 88 | 118 |
Championship: March 7, 2026 * indicates tournament champion Rankings: USCHO.com Top 20 Poll

== Schedule and results ==
| Date | Time | Opponent^{#} | Rank^{#} | Site | TV | Decision | Result | Attendance | Record |
Regular Season
| October 4 | 4:30 pm | Lake Superior State* | | Warrior Ice Arena • Boston, Massachusetts | NEC Front Row | Lipskis | L 3–5 | 300 | 0–1–0 |
| October 5 | 3:00 pm | Lake Superior State* | | Warrior Ice Arena • Boston, Massachusetts | NEC Front Row | Androlewicz | L 2–3 | 215 | 0–2–0 |
| October 10 | 7:00 pm | #14 Massachusetts* | | Warrior Ice Arena • Boston, Massachusetts | NEC Front Row | Androlewicz | L 1–4 | 415 | 0–3–0 |
| October 12 | 4:00 pm | at Army* | | Tate Rink • West Point, New York | FloHockey | Androlewicz | L 1–6 | 1,899 | 0–4–0 |
| October 18 | 5:00 pm | at Sacred Heart* | | Martire Family Arena • Fairfield, Connecticut | FloHockey | Androlewicz | W 3–2 | 2,634 | 1–4–0 |
| October 24 | 7:00 pm | at #5 Penn State* | | Pegula Ice Arena • University Park, Pennsylvania | BTN+ | Androlewicz | L 2–3 | 6,206 | 1–5–0 |
| October 25 | 6:00 pm | at #5 Penn State* | | Pegula Ice Arena • University Park, Pennsylvania | BTN+ | Androlewicz | L 2–4 | 6,370 | 1–6–0 |
| November 1 | 7:00 pm | Dartmouth* | | Warrior Ice Arena • Boston, Massachusetts | NEC Front Row | Androlewicz | L 2–5 | 253 | 1–7–0 |
| November 4 | 7:00 pm | at Harvard* | | Bright-Landry Hockey Center • Boston, Massachusetts | ESPN+ | Androlewicz | L 2–6 | 1,105 | 1–8–0 |
| November 7 | 7:00 pm | at #14 Northeastern* | | Matthews Arena • Boston, Massachusetts | ESPN+ | Androlewicz | L 0–2 | 2,465 | 1–9–0 |
| November 8 | 7:00 pm | at #14 Northeastern* | | Matthews Arena • Boston, Massachusetts | ESPN+ | Androlewicz | L 2–4 | — | 1–10–0 |
| November 15 | 7:00 pm | at Princeton* | | Hobey Baker Memorial Rink • Princeton, New Jersey | ESPN+ | Androlewicz | L 2–3 | 1,475 | 1–11–0 |
| November 18 | 7:00 pm | Alaska Anchorage* | | Warrior Ice Arena • Boston, Massachusetts | NEC Front Row | Androlewicz | L 0–4 | 134 | 1–12–0 |
| November 25 | 7:00 pm | at #12 Connecticut* | | PeoplesBank Arena • Hartford, Connecticut | ESPN+ | Androlewicz | T 3–3 ^{OT} | 4,138 | 1–12–1 |
| November 29 | 4:00 pm | at #8 Quinnipiac* | | M&T Bank Arena • Hamden, Connecticut | ESPN+ | Androlewicz | L 2–3 | 2,526 | 1–13–1 |
| December 5 | 11:00 pm | at Alaska Anchorage* | | Avis Alaska Sports Complex • Anchorage, Alaska | YouTube | Androlewicz | W 3–2 | 803 | 2–13–1 |
| December 6 | 9:00 pm | at Alaska Anchorage* | | Avis Alaska Sports Complex • Anchorage, Alaska | YouTube | Androlewicz | W 4–3 ^{OT} | 840 | 3–13–1 |
| January 2 | 7:00 pm | at St. Lawrence* | | Appleton Arena • Canton, New York | ESPN+ | Androlewicz | W 6–2 | 691 | 4–13–1 |
| January 3 | 5:00 pm | at St. Lawrence* | | Appleton Arena • Canton, New York | ESPN+ | Androlewicz | T 3–3 ^{OT} | 739 | 4–13–2 |
| January 9 | 7:00 pm | at #13 Boston College* | | Conte Forum • Chestnut Hill, Massachusetts (Exhibition) | ESPN+ | Androlewicz | L 2–8 | 5,595 | |
| January 11 | 3:00 pm | Long Island* | | Bridgewater Ice Arena • Bridgewater, Massachusetts | NEC Front Row | Androlewicz | L 2–3 | 239 | 4–14–2 |
| January 16 | 8:10 pm | at Lindenwood* | | Centene Community Ice Center • St. Charles, Missouri | FloHockey | Androlewicz | L 2–6 | 962 | 4–15–2 |
| January 17 | 8:10 pm | at Lindenwood* | | Centene Community Ice Center • St. Charles, Missouri | FloHockey | Androlewicz | L 1–5 | 937 | 4–16–2 |
| January 24 | 7:00 pm | Brown* | | Warrior Ice Arena • Boston, Massachusetts | NEC Front Row | Androlewicz | W 3–2 ^{OT} | 287 | 5–16–2 |
| January 30 | 7:00 pm | at Vermont* | | Gutterson Fieldhouse • Burlington, Vermont | ESPN+ | Androlewicz | L 2–3 ^{OT} | 1,992 | 5–17–2 |
| January 31 | 7:00 pm | at Vermont* | | Gutterson Fieldhouse • Burlington, Vermont | ESPN+ | Androlewicz | L 0–2 | 2,348 | 5–18–2 |
| February 3 | 7:00 pm | Merrimack* | | Warrior Ice Arena • Boston, Massachusetts | NEC Front Row | Androlewicz | L 5–9 | 208 | 5–19–2 |
| February 6 | 7:00 pm | Lindenwood* | | Warrior Ice Arena • Boston, Massachusetts | NEC Front Row | Lipskis | L 1–3 | 194 | 5–20–2 |
| February 7 | 7:00 pm | Lindenwood* | | Warrior Ice Arena • Boston, Massachusetts | NEC Front Row | Lipskis | W 5–1 | 189 | 6–20–2 |
| February 13 | 2:00 pm | at Long Island* | | Northwell Health Ice Center • East Meadow, New York | FloHockey | Lipskis | W 3–1 | 519 | 7–20–2 |
| February 14 | 2:00 pm | at Long Island* | | Northwell Health Ice Center • East Meadow, New York | FloHockey | Androlewicz | L 3–5 | 627 | 7–21–2 |
| February 20 | 7:00 pm | Long Island* | | Warrior Ice Arena • Boston, Massachusetts | NEC Front Row | Lipskis | W 5–1 | 185 | 8–21–2 |
| February 21 | 7:00 pm | Long Island* | | Warrior Ice Arena • Boston, Massachusetts | NEC Front Row | Androlewicz | W 3–2 | 232 | 9–21–2 |
| February 27 | 7:00 pm | Simon Fraser* | | Warrior Ice Arena • Boston, Massachusetts (Exhibition) | NEC Front Row | Androlewicz | W 9–3 | 55 | |
| February 28 | 7:00 pm | Simon Fraser* | | Warrior Ice Arena • Boston, Massachusetts (Exhibition) | NEC Front Row | Lipskis | W 5–2 | 234 | |
United Collegiate Hockey Cup
| March 5 | 4:00 pm | vs. Alaska Anchorage* | | Centene Community Ice Center • St. Charles, Missouri (UCHC Quarterfinal) | FloHockey | Androlewicz | W 0–3 | 232 | 10–21–2 |
| March 6 | 8:00 pm | vs. Alaska* | | Centene Community Ice Center • St. Charles, Missouri (UCHC Semifinal) | FloHockey | Androlewicz | T 4–4 ^{SOL} | 314 | 10–21–3 |
| March 7 | 4:00 pm | vs. Long Island* | | Centene Community Ice Center • St. Charles, Missouri (UCHC Third Place Game) | FloHockey | Lipskis | L 3–4 | 486 | 10–22–3 |
*Non-conference game. ^{#}Rankings from USCHO.com Poll. All times are in Eastern Time. Source:

== Scoring statistics ==
| Name | Position | Games | Goals | Assists | Points | PIM |
|---|---|---|---|---|---|---|
| Matthew Romer | F | 35 | 15 | 7 | 22 | 12 |
| Anthony Galante | F | 26 | 5 | 14 | 19 | 14 |
| Evan Orr | D | 35 | 5 | 13 | 18 | 8 |
| Billy Renfrew | F | 35 | 2 | 16 | 18 | 8 |
| Patrick Murphy | RW | 36 | 9 | 7 | 16 | 20 |
| Cole Melady | F | 34 | 7 | 9 | 16 | 14 |
| Justin Mexico | F | 31 | 5 | 11 | 16 | 8 |
| J. J. Grainda | LW | 35 | 11 | 4 | 15 | 16 |
| Joel Lehtinen | F | 34 | 6 | 9 | 15 | 22 |
| Teddy Lagerbäck | LW | 31 | 4 | 11 | 15 | 16 |
| Charlie Banquier | D | 35 | 3 | 8 | 11 | 22 |
| Leo Chambers | C | 30 | 2 | 8 | 10 | 2 |
| Frank Ireland | F | 29 | 2 | 7 | 9 | 6 |
| David Posma | D | 33 | 2 | 7 | 9 | 22 |
| Brady Hunter | C | 29 | 3 | 5 | 8 | 2 |
| Justin Gibson | D | 29 | 3 | 5 | 8 | 4 |
| Matthew Rafalski | D | 33 | 1 | 7 | 8 | 25 |
| Dominick Campione | D | 33 | 1 | 4 | 5 | 10 |
| Zach Nicolas | F | 21 | 1 | 3 | 4 | 0 |
| Zachary Aben | C/LW | 8 | 0 | 2 | 2 | 4 |
| Jake Gutwirth | F | 19 | 1 | 0 | 1 | 6 |
| Dylan Ghaemi | G | 2 | 0 | 0 | 0 | 0 |
| Adam Mahler | D | 3 | 0 | 0 | 0 | 2 |
| Ryan Davies | D | 4 | 0 | 0 | 0 | 0 |
| Jordin Palmer | D | 8 | 0 | 0 | 0 | 2 |
| Linards Lipskis | G | 9 | 0 | 0 | 0 | 0 |
| Devon Carlstrom | D | 23 | 0 | 0 | 0 | 4 |
| Connor Androlewicz | G | 29 | 0 | 0 | 0 | 2 |
| Total | | | 97 | 174 | 271 | 275 |

== Goaltending statistics ==
| Name | Games | Minutes | Wins | Losses | Ties | Goals Against | Saves | Shut Outs | SV % | GAA |
|---|---|---|---|---|---|---|---|---|---|---|
| Dylan Ghaemi | 2 | 12:51 | 0 | 0 | 0 | 0 | 5 | 0 | 1.000 | 0.00 |
| Connor Androlewicz | 30 | 1727:19 | 8 | 19 | 3 | 93 | 799 | 1 | .896 | 3.23 |
| Linards Lipskis | 10 | 427:58 | 3 | 3 | 0 | 25 | 194 | 0 | .886 | 3.50 |
| Empty Net | - | 11:02 | - | - | - | 3 | - | - | - | - |
| Total | 36 | 2192:01 | 11 | 22 | 3 | 121 | 1003 | 1 | .892 | 3.31 |

== Rankings ==
| Poll | Week | | | | | | | | | | | | | | | | | | | | | | | | | | | |
| Poll | Pre | 1 | 2 | 3 | 4 | 5 | 6 | 7 | 8 | 9 | 10 | 11 | 12 | 13 | 14 | 15 | 16 | 17 | 18 | 19 | 20 | 21 | 22 | 23 | 24 | 25 | 26 | 27 (Final) |
|---|---|---|---|---|---|---|---|---|---|---|---|---|---|---|---|---|---|---|---|---|---|---|---|---|---|---|---|---|
| USCHO.com | NR | NR | NR | NR | NR | NR | NR | NR | NR | NR | NR | NR | – | NR | NR | NR | NR | NR | NR | NR | NR | NR | NR | NR | NR | NR | NR | NR |
| USA Hockey | NR | NR | NR | NR | NR | NR | NR | NR | NR | NR | NR | NR | – | NR | NR | NR | NR | NR | NR | NR | NR | NR | NR | NR | NR | NR | NR | NR |

Note: USCHO did not release a poll in week 12.
Note: USA Hockey did not release a poll in week 12.
