= 2025–26 Alaska Nanooks men's ice hockey season =

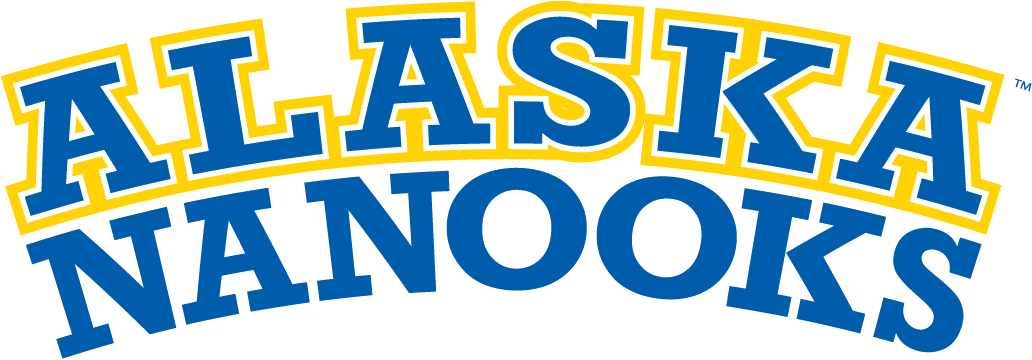

Adirondack Winter Invitational, Champion United Collegiate Hockey Cup, Champion
- Conference: Independent
- Home ice: Carlson Center

Rankings
- USCHO: NR
- USA Hockey: NR

Record
- Overall: 15–15–3
- Home: 7–4–1
- Road: 5–11–1
- Neutral: 3–0–1

Coaches and captains
- Head coach: Erik Largen
- Assistant coaches: Matt Curley; Ryan Theros; Sean Walsh
- Captain: Chase Dafoe

The 2025–26 Alaska Nanooks men's ice hockey season was the 76th season of play for the program and 41th at the Division I level. The Nanooks represented the University of Alaska Fairbanks in the 2025–26 NCAA Division I men's ice hockey season, played their games at the Carlson Center and were coached by Erik Largen in his 7th season.

== Season ==
With a high degree of roster turnover (sixteen new faces), Alaska was unknown quantity entering the season. While Lassi Lehti was expected to remain the starting netminder, team captain Chase Dafoe was the only one of the top five scorers who remained on the team. The degree of unfamiliarity was born out in the early part of the season as Alaska won just twice in its first eleven games. While it can't be discounted that the Nanooks played some of the top teams in the country during this time, the club's lack of offense left them unable to take advantage of several solid performances in goal.

By the middle of January, Alaska's season was teetering on the brink. Already eight games below .500, the Nanooks had no chance to make the NCAA tournament but that didn't mean their season was over. With their final twelve games all coming against fellow independent teams, Alaska had a chance to redeem itself from its poor start. After holding arch-rival Alaska Anchorage to a tie in the first game of the season series, Alaska's offence finally woke up. Over a six-game stretch, the Nanooks scored at least four goals and continued that torrid pace for the remainder of the season. Michael Citara, a graduate transfer who recovered from two separate season-ending injuries, led the offense with 16 goals on the season. Due primarily to Alaska winning six of eight games against the Seawolves, the Nanooks received the top seed for the inaugural United Collegiate Hockey Cup.

Alaska played its first postseason game in six years when they faced Stonehill in the semifinal round. While the Nanooks started strong and built a 2-goal lead less than four minutes into the game, the Skyhawks would not go quietly. With Alaska leading 3–1 early in the second, Stonehill scored three straight goals to completely change the tenor of the match. With time winding down at the end of regulation, Alaska was forced to pull their goaltender to try and tie the game. Time slowly ticked away on Alaska's championship hopes and it looked like they had missed their chance until Braden Birnie scored with just 1.2 seconds to play. Overtime was rather muted with just 4 shots being recorded and none finding the twine. The game finished in a shootout and both goaltenders were flawless through the first three rounds. After Lehti stopped Stonehill's fourth attempt, Tommy Cronin fired home the winning tally and sent Alaska to the championship game.

In their final game of the season, Alaska got off to a slower start but still possessed a lead after both the first and second periods. Lindenwood, much like Stonehill, refused to knuckle under and fired a barrage of shots on goal in the third. Lehti did yeoman's work to keep Alaska in the game, stopping 21 of 23 shots in the period. When the dust settled, overtime was again required to settle the match. Just 24 seconds into the extra frame, two players who were playing in their final college game proved to be the heroes. Birnie intercepted a pass and swiftly found Dafoe who netted the winner, ending Alaska's season on a high note.

== Departures ==
Player	Position	Nationality	Cause
Kyle Gaffney	Forward	United States	Transferred to Minnesota Duluth
Nicholas Grabko	Goaltender	United States	Graduation (signed with Idaho Steelheads)
Will Hilfiker	Defenseman	United States	Transferred to Utica
Matt Hubbarde	Forward	Canada	Graduation (signed with Iowa Heartlanders)
Luke Johnson	Forward	United States	Transferred to Alaska Anchorage
Matt Koethe	Forward	United States	Graduation (signed with Tulsa Oilers)
Luke LaMaster	Defenseman	United States	Graduation (signed with Utah Grizzlies)
Bryce Monrean	Forward	United States	Transferred to Alaska Anchorage
Brayden Nicholetts	Forward	Canada	Graduation (signed with Utah Grizzlies)
Matteo Pecchia	Forward	Canada	Graduation (retired)
Cole Plowman	Goaltender	Canada	Transferred to Manitoba
Matt Rickard	Defenseman	United States	Graduation (retired)
Brendan Ross	Forward	Canada	Transferred to Providence
Anton Rubtsov	Forward	Russia	Graduation (signed with Danbury Hat Tricks)
Broten Sabo	Defenseman	United States	Transferred to Ohio State
Tyler Waram	Defenseman	United States	Transferred to Wisconsin–River Falls

== Recruiting ==
Player	Position	Nationality	Age	Notes
Jackson Anderson	Defenseman	United States	21	Prior Lake, Minnesota
Dāvis Borozinskis	Forward	Latvia	20	Liepāja, Latvia
Zak Brice	Goaltender	United States	22	Fairbanks, Alaska; transfer from Arizona State
Michael Citara	Forward	United States	23	New Hope, Pennsylvania; graduate transfer from Merrimack
Beau Courtney	Forward	United States	21	Parker, Colorado
Tommy Cronin	Forward	United States	21	Edina, Minnesota
Misha Danylov	Forward	Ukraine	21	Kyiv, Ukraine
Liam Fleet	Defenseman	United States	21	Denver, Colorado
Jhett Larson	Forward	Canada	21	Delisle, Saskatchewan
Alexander Malinowski	Forward	Sweden	21	Linköping, SWE; transfer from American International
Hugo Marcil	Defenseman	United States	21	Bourget, Ontario
Kyle Miller	Defenseman	United States	20	San Jose, California
Rylen Roersma	Forward	Canada	21	Lethbridge, Alberta
Lucas Sorace	Defenseman	Canada	22	Kamloops, British Columbia; transfer from Calgary
Dylan Sydor	Forward	Canada	22	Kamloops, British Columbia; transfer from Calgary
Calvin Vachon	Goaltender	United States	20	Redondo Beach, California

== Roster ==
As of August 20, 2025.

No.	Nat.	Player	Class	Pos	Height	Weight	DoB	Hometown	Previous team	NHL rights
2	(United States)	Carson Reed	Sophomore	D	6' 0" (1.83 m)	194 lb (88 kg)	2004-04-20	Warroad, Minnesota	Waterloo Black Hawks (USHL)	—
4	(Canada)	Noah Barlage	Sophomore	D	6' 0" (1.83 m)	185 lb (84 kg)	2003-03-28	Humboldt, Saskatchewan	Madison Capitols (USHL)	—
5	(United States)	Liam Fleet	Freshman	D	6' 2" (1.88 m)	205 lb (93 kg)	2004-04-19	Denver, Colorado	Shreveport Mudbugs (NAHL)	—
6	(Canada)	Jhett Larson	Freshman	F	5' 9" (1.75 m)	176 lb (80 kg)	2004-02-03	Delisle, Saskatchewan	Red Deer Rebels (WHL)	—
7	(United States)	Jackson Anderson	Freshman	D	6' 2" (1.88 m)	170 lb (77 kg)	2004-02-26	Prior Lake, Minnesota	Surrey Eagles (BCHL)	—
8	(Canada)	Braden Birnie	Senior	F	6' 2" (1.88 m)	195 lb (88 kg)	2001-08-19	Weyburn, Saskatchewan	Steinbach Pistons (MJHL)	—
9	(Canada)	Dean Spak	Sophomore	F	5' 10" (1.78 m)	181 lb (82 kg)	2003-02-21	Calgary, Alberta	Okotoks Oilers (BCHL)	—
10	(United States)	William Lawson-Body	Junior	F	5' 10" (1.78 m)	170 lb (77 kg)	2002-04-04	Grand Forks, North Dakota	Oklahoma Warriors (NAHL)	—
11	(United States)	Haden Kruse	Sophomore	F	6' 1" (1.85 m)	172 lb (78 kg)	2003-03-25	Nisswa, Minnesota	Janesville Jets (NAHL)	—
12	(Canada)	Adam Cardona	Junior	D	6' 2" (1.88 m)	188 lb (85 kg)	2003-10-05	Beaconsfield, Quebec	Massachusetts Lowell (HEA)	—
13	(Belarus)	Fyodor Nikolayenya	Junior	F	5' 11" (1.8 m)	179 lb (81 kg)	2003-02-28	Minsk, Belarus	Anchorage Wolverines (NAHL)	—
14	(United States)	Tommy Cronin	Freshman	F	5' 10" (1.78 m)	187 lb (85 kg)	2004-09-10	Edina, Minnesota	Bismarck Bobcats (NAHL)	—
15	(Canada)	Dylan Sydor	Sophomore	F	5' 10" (1.78 m)	170 lb (77 kg)	2003-04-07	Kamloops, British Columbia	Calgary (CWUAA)	—
16	(Canada)	Trenton Penner	Sophomore	F	6' 2" (1.88 m)	190 lb (86 kg)	2003-02-23	Winkler, Manitoba	Winkler Flyers (MJHL)	—
17	(Ukraine)	Misha Danilov	Freshman	F	5' 8" (1.73 m)	154 lb (70 kg)	2004-08-01	Kyiv, Ukraine	Green Bay Gamblers (USHL)	—
18	(Canada)	Rylen Roersma	Freshman	F	5' 11" (1.8 m)	190 lb (86 kg)	2004-07-25	Lethbridge, Alberta	Edmonton Oil Kings (WHL)	—
20	(United States)	Cade Ahrenholz	Senior	F	6' 3" (1.91 m)	218 lb (99 kg)	2002-11-30	Lakeville, Minnesota	Colorado College (NCHC)	—
23	(Canada)	Caelum Dick	Sophomore	D	5' 10" (1.78 m)	183 lb (83 kg)	2003-11-21	Sherwood Park, Alberta	Dubuque Fighting Saints (USHL)	—
24	(United States)	Peyton Platter	Sophomore	F	6' 1" (1.85 m)	181 lb (82 kg)	2003-11-02	Eau Claire, Wisconsin	Chippewa Steel (NAHL)	—
25	(Sweden)	Alexander Malinowski	Senior	F	5' 11" (1.8 m)	185 lb (84 kg)	2001-02-07	Linköping, Sweden	American International (AHA)	—
26	(United States)	Nathan Rickey	Sophomore	D	6' 4" (1.93 m)	170 lb (77 kg)	2003-11-20	New Lenox, Illinois	Oklahoma Warriors (NAHL)	—
27	(Canada)	Lucas Sorace	Freshman	D	6' 1" (1.85 m)	181 lb (82 kg)	2004-07-15	Port Moody, British Columbia	Chilliwack Chiefs (BCHL)	—
28	(United States)	Michael Citara	Graduate	F	5' 10" (1.78 m)	160 lb (73 kg)	2002-04-22	New Hope, Pennsylvania	Merrimack (HEA)	—
29	(United States)	Beau Courtney	Freshman	F	5' 10" (1.78 m)	179 lb (81 kg)	2004-01-12	Parker, Colorado	Kamloops Blazers (WHL)	—
31	(United States)	Zak Brice	Freshman (RS)	G	5' 11" (1.8 m)	174 lb (79 kg)	2003-01-25	Fairbanks, Alaska	Arizona State (NCHC)	—
32	(United States)	Calvin Vachon	Freshman	G	5' 11" (1.8 m)	168 lb (76 kg)	2005-07-19	Redondo Beach, California	Waterloo Black Hawks (USHL)	—
34	(United States)	Kyle Miller	Freshman	D	5' 9" (1.75 m)	174 lb (79 kg)	2004-10-14	San Jose, California	St. Cloud Norsemen (NAHL)	—
35	(Finland)	Lassi Lehti	Senior	G	6' 3" (1.91 m)	210 lb (95 kg)	2001-11-29	Espoo, Finland	Minot Minotauros (NAHL)	—
36	(Latvia)	Dāvis Borozinskis	Freshman	F	6' 0" (1.83 m)	190 lb (86 kg)	2004-10-26	Liepāja, Latvia	Omaha Lancers (USHL)	—
37	(Canada)	Chase Dafoe (C)	Senior	F	6' 3" (1.91 m)	200 lb (91 kg)	2002-02-25	Peachland, British Columbia	Providence (HEA)	—
38	(Canada)	Hugo Marcil	Freshman	F	5' 10" (1.78 m)	179 lb (81 kg)	2004-08-07	Bourget, Ontario	Sherbrooke Phoenix (QMJHL)	—

== Standings ==
2025–26 NCAA Division I Independent ice hockey standings
	Overall record					
	GP	W	L	T	GF	GA
Alaska*	33	15	15	3	96	99
Alaska Anchorage	33	5	27	1	57	134
Lindenwood	30	15	15	0	105	114
Long Island	33	14	18	1	105	112
Stonehill	35	10	22	3	88	118
Championship: March 7, 2026 * indicates tournament champion Rankings: USCHO.com Top 20 Poll

== Schedule and results ==
Date	Time	Opponent^{#}	Rank^{#}	Site	TV	Decision	Result	Attendance	Record
Exhibition
September 26	7:07 pm	UNLV*		Carlson Center • Fairbanks, Alaska (Exhibition)	FloHockey		W 3–0	1,779	
September 27	7:07 pm	Briercrest*		Carlson Center • Fairbanks, Alaska (Exhibition)	FloHockey		W 8–0	1,738	
Regular Season
October 3	7:07 pm	Minnesota Duluth*		Carlson Center • Fairbanks, Alaska	FloHockey	Lehti	L 1–5	2,220	0–1–0
October 4	7:07 pm	Minnesota Duluth*		Carlson Center • Fairbanks, Alaska	FloHockey	Vachon	L 1–4	2,700	0–2–0
Ice Breaker Tournament
October 10	4:00 pm	vs. #8 Quinnipiac*		Mullett Arena • Tempe, Arizona (Ice Breaker Semifinal)		Lehti	W 2–1	300	1–2–0
October 11	8:00 pm	at #15 Arizona State*		Mullett Arena • Tempe, Arizona (Ice Breaker Championship)	Fox 10	Lehti	L 2–5	—	1–3–0
October 17	7:07 pm	Michigan Tech*		Carlson Center • Fairbanks, Alaska	FloHockey	Lehti	L 1–3	2,164	1–4–0
October 18	7:07 pm	Michigan Tech*		Carlson Center • Fairbanks, Alaska	FloHockey	Lehti	W 5–1	3,120	2–4–0
October 24	4:00 pm	at #17 Wisconsin*		Kohl Center • Madison, Wisconsin	B1G+	Lehti	L 3–5	8,190	2–5–0
October 25	3:00 pm	at #17 Wisconsin*		Kohl Center • Madison, Wisconsin	B1G+	Vachon	L 1–4	10,584	2–6–0
October 31	3:00 pm	Princeton*		Hobey Baker Memorial Rink • Princeton, New Jersey	ESPN+	Lehti	L 2–5	920	2–7–0
November 1	3:00 pm	Princeton*		Hobey Baker Memorial Rink • Princeton, New Jersey	ESPN+	Vachon	L 3–6	1,159	2–8–0
November 4	3:00 pm	#5 Quinnipiac*		M&T Bank Arena • Hamden, Connecticut	ESPN+	Lehti	T 2–2 ^{OT}	2,511	2–8–1
November 8	7:07 pm	Simon Fraser*		Carlson Center • Fairbanks, Alaska (Exhibition)	FloHockey	Vachon	T 1–1 ^{OT}	2,702	
Adirondack Winter Invitational
November 28	12:00 pm	vs. St. Lawrence*		Herb Brooks Arena • Lake Placid, New York (Adirondack Game 1)	ESPN+	Lehti	W 2–0	1,067	3–8–1
November 29	3:30 pm	vs. Clarkson*		Herb Brooks Arena • Lake Placid, New York (Adirondack Game 2)	ESPN+	Lehti	W 3–2	1,598	4–8–1
December 6	7:07 pm	Grand Canyon*		Carlson Center • Fairbanks, Alaska (Exhibition)	FloHockey	Vachon	W 4–2	2,290	
December 12	3:00 pm	at Union*		M&T Bank Center • Schenectady, New York	ESPN+	Lehti	L 1–5	1,702	4–9–1
December 13	1:00 pm	at Union*		M&T Bank Center • Schenectady, New York	ESPN+	Vachon	L 2–3	2,002	4–10–1
January 2	3:00 pm	at #16 Providence*		Schneider Arena • Providence, Rhode Island	ESPN+	Lehti	L 2–5	2,134	4–11–1
January 3	1:00 pm	at #16 Providence*		Schneider Arena • Providence, Rhode Island	ESPN+	Vachon	W 5–1	2,442	5–11–1
January 9	3:00 pm	at #14 Cornell*		Lynah Rink • Ithaca, New York	ESPN+	Vachon	L 1–7	2,108	5–12–1
January 10	3:00 pm	at #14 Cornell*		Lynah Rink • Ithaca, New York	ESPN+	Vachon	L 2–5	2,874	5–13–1
January 16	7:07 pm	Alaska Anchorage*		Carlson Center • Fairbanks, Alaska (Governor's Cup)	FloHockey	Lehti	T 1–1 ^{OT}	2,343	5–13–2
January 17	7:07 pm	Alaska Anchorage*		Carlson Center • Fairbanks, Alaska (Governor's Cup)	FloHockey	Lehti	W 4–1	3,401	6–13–2
January 23	7:07 pm	Lindenwood*		Carlson Center • Fairbanks, Alaska	FloHockey	Lehti	W 5–2	1,663	7–13–2
January 24	7:07 pm	Lindenwood*		Carlson Center • Fairbanks, Alaska	FloHockey	Lehti	L 4–7	1,792	7–14–2
January 30	7:07 pm	Long Island*		Carlson Center • Fairbanks, Alaska	FloHockey	Lehti	W 5–1	1,887	8–14–2
January 31	7:07 pm	Long Island*		Carlson Center • Fairbanks, Alaska	FloHockey	Lehti	W 5–1	2,185	9–14–2
February 6	7:07 pm	at Alaska Anchorage*		Sullivan Arena • Anchorage, Alaska (Governor's Cup)		Lehti	W 4–1	4,595	10–14–2
February 7	7:07 pm	at Alaska Anchorage*		Sullivan Arena • Anchorage, Alaska (Governor's Cup)		Lehti	L 2–3 ^{OT}	4,865	10–15–2
February 20	7:07 pm	at Alaska Anchorage*		Sullivan Arena • Anchorage, Alaska (Governor's Cup)		Lehti	W 4–3	3,035	11–15–2
February 21	7:07 pm	at Alaska Anchorage*		Sullivan Arena • Anchorage, Alaska (Governor's Cup)		Lehti	W 6–2	3,865	12–15–2
February 27	7:07 pm	Alaska Anchorage*		Carlson Center • Fairbanks, Alaska (Governor's Cup)	FloHockey	Vachon	W 2–0	2,032	13–15–2
February 28	7:07 pm	Alaska Anchorage*		Carlson Center • Fairbanks, Alaska (Governor's Cup)	FloHockey	Lehti	W 5–1	3,231	14–15–2
United Collegiate Hockey Cup
March 6	12:00 pm	vs. Stonehill*		Centene Community Ice Center • St. Charles, Missouri (UCHC Semifinal)	FloHockey	Lehti	T 4–4 ^{SOW}	314	14–15–3
March 6	4:00 pm	at Lindenwood*		Centene Community Ice Center • St. Charles, Missouri (UCHC Championship)	FloHockey	Lehti	W 4–3 ^{OT}	1,023	15–15–3
*Non-conference game. ^{#}Rankings from USCHO.com Poll. All times are in Alaska Time. Source:

== Scoring statistics ==
Name	Position	Games	Goals	Assists	Points	PIM
Michael Citara	RW	33	16	15	31	20
Rylen Roersma	C	31	9	13	22	32
Chase Dafoe	C/LW	33	13	8	21	22
Peyton Platter	C/LW/RW	31	8	13	21	36
Braden Birnie	F	33	7	11	18	22
Alexander Malinowski	LW/RW	28	10	6	16	8
Tommy Cronin	F	18	4	12	16	8
Nathan Rickey	D	33	3	13	16	4
Jhett Larson	F	32	7	7	14	16
Misha Danylov	F	28	4	7	11	13
Dean Spak	F	25	2	7	9	22
Carson Reed	D	32	2	6	8	4
Jackson Anderson	D	32	2	6	8	14
Dāvis Borozinskis	LW	31	3	4	7	10
Cade Ahrenholz	LW/RW	15	2	4	6	6
Hugo Marcil	D	18	0	6	6	10
Adam Cardona	D	31	0	6	6	26
Liam Fleet	D	20	2	3	5	29
Caelum Dick	D	19	0	5	5	6
Noah Barlage	D	31	0	4	4	4
Lucas Sorace	D	7	0	2	2	0
Dylan Sydor	F	14	0	2	2	10
Beau Courtney	F	7	1	0	1	2
Haden Kruse	F	15	1	0	1	6
Kyle Miller	D	4	0	1	1	4
Lassi Lehti	G	25	0	1	1	0
Zak Brice	G	1	0	0	0	0
Trenton Penner	F	6	0	0	0	18
Fyodor Nikolayenya	F	8	0	0	0	4
Calvin Vachon	G	9	0	0	0	0
William Lawson-Body	F	13	0	0	0	0
Total			96	160	256	376

== Goaltending statistics ==
Name	Games	Minutes	Wins	Losses	Ties	Goals against	Saves	Shut outs	SV %	GAA
Lassi Lehti	26	1492:09	13	9	3	60	680	1	.919	2.41
Calvin Vachon	9	463:33	2	6	0	24	209	1	.897	3.11
Zak Brice	1	9:16	0	0	0	1	5	0	.833	6.47
Empty Net	-	31:21	-	-	-	14	-	-	-	-
Total	33	1996:19	15	15	3	99	894	2	.900	2.98

== Rankings ==
Poll	Week																											
Poll	Pre	1	2	3	4	5	6	7	8	9	10	11	12	13	14	15	16	17	18	19	20	21	22	23	24	25	26	27 (Final)
USCHO.com	NR	NR	NR	NR	NR	NR	NR	NR	NR	NR	NR	NR	–	NR	NR	NR	NR	NR	NR	NR	NR	NR	NR	NR	NR	NR	NR	NR
USA Hockey	NR	NR	NR	NR	NR	NR	NR	NR	NR	NR	NR	NR	–	NR	NR	NR	NR	NR	NR	NR	NR	NR	NR	NR	NR	NR	NR	NR

Note: USCHO did not release a poll in week 12.
Note: USA Hockey did not release a poll in week 12.
