= List of UCHC All-Tournament Team =

The United Collegiate Hockey Cup All-Tournament Team is an honor bestowed at the conclusion of the independent tournament to the players judged to have performed the best during the championship. The All-Tournament Team was first awarded after the inaugural championship in 2026.

== All-Tournament Teams ==
=== 2020s ===
2026
Player	Pos	Team
Lassi Lehti	G	Alaska
Nolan Seed	D	Lindenwood
Nathan Rickey	D	Alaska
Michael Citara	F	Alaska
Jacob Fletcher	F	Lindenwood
Noah Serdachny	F	Long Island

== See also ==
- Most Valuable Player in Tournament
