= Erik Largen =

American ice hockey player and coach

Current position
- Title: Head coach
- Team: Alaska
- Conference: Independent
- Record: 108–107–24 (.502)

Biographical details
- Born: October 17, 1986 (age 40); Fairbanks, Alaska, U.S.
- Education: University of Alaska Fairbanks

Playing career
- 2005–2006: North Iowa Outlaws
- 2006: Southern Minnesota Express
- 2006–2008: Alaska
- Position: Goaltender

Coaching career (HC unless noted)
- 2009–2011: Fairbanks Ice Dogs (Goaltending coach)
- 2011–2013: Twin Cities Northern Lights
- 2013: Tri-City Storm (asst.)
- 2014–2015: Janesville Jets (asst.)
- 2015–2016: Marian
- 2016–2018: Alaska (asst.)
- 2018–present: Alaska

Head coaching record
- Overall: 126–114–27 (.522)

Accomplishments and honors

Championships
- 2026 UCHC Champion

Awards
- 2026 AHCA Coach of the year

Erik Largen is an American ice hockey coach and former player who is currently in charge of the program at Alaska Fairbanks.

== Career ==
Largen is a Fairbanks native, being born and raised in the area. After graduating from West Valley High he spent a year playing for two teams in the NAHL before enrolling at Alaska Fairbanks in 2006. Largen served as a backup goalie for two years, playing a total of four games, before ending his playing career.

After leaving the university Largen remained in the area, joining the staff of the Fairbanks Ice Dogs as a goaltending coach. In his first the Ice Dogs reached the Robertson Cup Finals and claimed the championship the following year. Largen received his first head coaching job in 2011 when he joined the Twin Cities Northern Lights In his two seasons with the team Largen guided them to a collective 87-9-2 record, consecutive Bush Cup victories and a national runner up finish in 2013. Beginning in 2013 Largen was an assistant with the Tri-City Storm but left around the new year when he was offered a better position with the Janesville Jets. He remained with the Jets for a year and a half, helping the team claim the regular season title in 2015.

In 2015 Largen returned to the college ranks as the head coach for Marian. After a slow start the Sabres caught fire after the new year and won 13 consecutive games before being stopped by #1 St. Norbert. Marian was ranked 12th by the end of the season and finished with an 18-7-3 record but just missed out on the 11-team national tournament. After the successful season Largen jumped to the Division I ranks and accepted the assistant coaching job with his alma mater.

After one season back with the Nanooks head coach Dallas Ferguson left to take over the Calgary Hitmen and he was replaced by Lance West with Largen continuing in the same role. At the time it wasn't revealed that West was only an interim head coach due to the incomplete hiring process. After the season this necessitated the position becoming available once more and though West was a candidate once more, the university decided to go with Largen instead.

== College Head coaching record ==
Record table
Season	Team	Overall	Conference	Standing	Postseason
Marian Sabres (NCHA) (2015–2016)
2015–16	Marian	18–7–3	15–4–1	3rd	NCHA Semifinals
Marian:		18–7–3	15–4–1		
Alaska Nanooks (WCHA) (2018–2021)
2018–19	Alaska	12–21–3	12–14–2–2	7th	WCHA Quarterfinals
2019–20	Alaska	16–15–5	14–9–5–2	4th	WCHA Quarterfinals
2020–21	Alaska				Season Cancelled
Alaska:		28–36–8	26–23–7		
Alaska Nanooks Independent (2021–present)
2021–22	Alaska	14–18–2			
2022–23	Alaska	22–10–2			
2023–24	Alaska	17–14–3			
2024–25	Alaska	12–14–6			
2025–26	Alaska	15–15–3			UCHC Champion
Alaska:		80–61–16			
Total:		126–114–27			
National champion Postseason invitational champion Conference regular season champion Conference regular season and conference tournament champion Division regular season champion Division regular season and conference tournament champion Conference tournament champion
