= 2026 United Collegiate Hockey Cup =

2026 Independent men's ice hockey tournament
- Dates: March 5–7, 2026
- Teams: 5
- Finals site: Centene Community Ice Center; St. Charles, Missouri
- Champions: Alaska (1st title)
- Winning coach: Erik Largen (1st title)
- MVP: Lassi Lehti (Alaska)
- Independent men's Ice Hockey Tournaments

The 2026 United Collegiate Hockey Cup is the inaugural tournament arranged for independent Division I programs. It was played between March 5 and March 7, 2026, at the Centene Community Ice Center in St. Charles, Missouri.

== Format ==
The tournament features three rounds of play. The five competing teams were sorted based upon their record in games against each other. The top three teams received a bye into the semifinal round while the two lowest-ranked teams played in a quarterfinal game. The winner of the quarterfinal game (Game One) advanced to play the top overall seed (Game Three). The loser of the quarterfinal match would play in the first consolation game (Game Four). The second- and third-ranked teams played in a semifinal match (Game Two) with the winner advancing to the championship (Game Six) and the loser being relegated to a consolation game (Game Four). The winner of the semifinal that included the top overall seed (Game Three) advanced to the championship game (Game Six) while the loser would face the victor of the first consolation game (Game Four) in a second consolation game (Game Five).

== Conference standings ==
2025–26 NCAA Division I Independent ice hockey standings
	Overall record					
	GP	W	L	T	GF	GA
Alaska*	33	15	15	3	96	99
Alaska Anchorage	33	5	27	1	57	134
Lindenwood	30	15	15	0	105	114
Long Island	32	13	18	1	97	109
Stonehill	35	10	22	3	88	118
Championship: March 7, 2026 * indicates tournament champion Rankings: USCHO.com Top 20 Poll

== Bracket ==
=== Bracket ===
Third Place Game; March 7
3	Long Island	4
4	Stonehill	3

Consolation Semifinal; March 6
3	Long Island	4*
5	Alaska Anchorage	3

Quarterfinal; March 5
4	Stonehill	3
5	Alaska Anchorage	0

Semifinals; March 5, 6
1	Alaska	4†
4	Stonehill	4
2	Lindenwood	5
3	Long Island	4

Championship; March 7
1	Alaska	4*
2	Lindenwood	3

Note: * denotes overtime period(s)
Note: † denotes shootout win

== Results ==
Note: All game times are local.

=== Quarterfinal ===
==== (4) Stonehill vs. (5) Alaska Anchorage ====
March 5, 2026; 3:00 pm	Stonehill	3–0 (0–0, 1–0, 2–0)	Alaska Anchorage	Centene Community Ice Center; Attendance: 301

Game reference

Connor Androlewicz
Goalies
Tyler Krivtsov
Referees:
Danny Bethmann
Pat Sharron
Linesmen:
Gerard Lamoureux
Grant Kennedy

(Mexico, Rafalski) Brady Hunter (3) – GW – 35:56	1–0
(Galante, Posma) Leo Chambers (2) – 51:04	2–0
(Renfrew) Cole Melady (7) – EN – 57:40	3–0

4 min
Penalties
18 min
32
Shots
32

=== Semifinals ===
==== (1) Alaska vs. (4) Stonehill ====
March 6, 2026; 3:00 pm	Alaska	5–4 SO (2–1, 1–1, 1–2, 0–0, 1–0)	Stonehill	Centene Community Ice Center; Attendance: 314

Game reference

Lassi Lehti
Goalies
Connor Androlewicz
Referees:
Pat Sharron
Anthony Vikhter
Linesmen:
Rich Palo
Grant Kennedy

(Citara) Misha Danylov (4) – 01:15	1–0
(Cronin) Peyton Platter (7) – 03:20	2–0
	2–1	08:31 – Joseph Grainda (11) (Lagerbäck, Lehtinen)
(Galante, Romer) Alexander Malinowski (10) – 22:41	3–1
	3–2	26:16 – David Posma (2) (Chambers, Hunter)
	3–3	40:44 – PP – Pat Murphy (7) (Galante, Romer)
	3–4	51:28 – Joel Lehtinen (6) (Lagerbäck)
(Citara) Braden Birnie (7) – EA – 59:59	4–4
Cronin – SOW – 65:00	5–4

4 min
Penalties
4 min
38
Shots
37

==== (2) Lindenwood vs. (3) Long Island ====
March 5, 2026; 7:00 pm	Lindenwood	5–4 (1–2, 3–1, 1–1)	Long Island	Centene Community Ice Center; Attendance: 512

Game reference

Liam Beerman
Goalies
Daniel Duris
Referees:
Andy Bethmann
Anthony Vikhter
Linesmen:
Rich Palo
Vaughn Upton

(unassisted) Jaeden Mercier (3) – 01:35	1–0
	1–1	06:15 – Luca Leighton (4) (Benoit, Kinch)
	1–2	14:28 – Daniel Baldassarra (3) (Bernardo, Lucarelli)
(Savoie, Morneau) Olivier Houde (13) – 22:21	2–2
(Rego, Southgate) Jacob Delaney (3) – 29:26	3–2
(Fontaine, Southgate) Jacob Fletcher (13) – 38:03	4–2
	4–3	39:24 – Dylan Kinch (9) (Griebel)
	4–4	46:54 – J. R. Perdion (10) (Baldassarra, Benoit)
(Elias) Anselmo Rego (7) – GW – 59:52	5–4

6 min
Penalties
4 min
41
Shots
48

=== Championship ===
==== (1) Alaska vs. (2) Lindenwood ====
March 7, 2026; 7:00 pm	Alaska	4–3 OT (1–0, 2–1, 0–2, 1–0)	Lindenwood	Centene Community Ice Center; Attendance: 1,023

Game reference

Lassi Lehti
Goalies
Liam Beerman
Referees:
Danny Bethmann
Anthony Vikhter
Linesmen:
Rich Palo
Gerard Lamoureux

(Danylov, Citara) Peyton Platter (8) – 15:34	1–0
	1–1	25:20 – Ethan Zielke (2) (Rego)
(Platter) Michael Citara (16) – 33:13	2–1
(unassisted) Dean Spak (2) – 34:20	3–1
	3–2	50:16 – Louis-Philippe Fontaine (10) (Fletcher)
	3–3	57:22 – Jacob Fletcher (14) (Southgate, Bevilacqua)
(Birnie) Chase Dafoe (13) – GW – 60:24	4–3

2 min
Penalties
0 min
22
Shots
42

=== Consolation Semifinal ===
==== (3) Long Island vs. (5) Alaska Anchorage ====
March 6, 2026; 7:00 pm	Long Island	4–3 OT (0–0, 2–1, 1–2, 1–0)	Alaska Anchorage	Centene Community Ice Center; Attendance: 486

Game reference

Daniel Duris
Goalies
Bryant Marks
Referees:
Andy Bethmann
Danny Bethmann
Linesmen:
Vaughn Upton
Gerard Lamoureux

	0–1	29:56 – PP – Aiden Westin (7) (Spencer, Kebreau)
(Perdion) Isaac Lambert (9) – 33:56	1–1
(Griebel, Benoit) Noah Serdachny (10) – PP – 35:27	2–1
(unassisted) Noah Serdachny (11) – 40:30	3–1
	3–2	49:04 – Tye Spencer (8) (Marks)
	3–3	52:07 – Aiden Westin (8) (McNarland, Gagnon)
(unassisted) Isaac Lambert (10) – GW – 64:11	4–3

23 min
Penalties
4 min
22
Shots
40

=== Third Place Game ===
==== (3) Long Island vs. (4) Stonehill ====
March 7, 2026; 3:00 pm	Long Island	4–3 (2–2, 1–0, 1–1)	Stonehill	Centene Community Ice Center; Attendance: 378

Game reference

Daniel Duris
Goalies
Linards Lipskis
Referees:
Andy Bethmann
Pat Sharron
Linesmen:
Vaughn Upton
Grant Kennedy

(Griebel, Benoit) Noah Serdachny (12) – 10:54	1–0
	1–1	12:57 – Pat Murphy (8) (Spencer, Kebreau)
	1–2	15:54 – PP – Pat Murphy (8) (Marks)
(Griebel, Benoit) Sixten Jennersjö (8) – 17:06	2–2
(Lambert, Serdachny) J. R. Perdion (11) – 26:08	3–2
(unassisted) Noah Serdachny (13) – PP GW – 52:08	4–2
	4–3	59:35 – EA – Matthew Romer (8) (Renfrew)

4 min
Penalties
8 min
28
Shots
28

== Tournament awards ==
=== All-Tournament Team ===
- G Lassi Lehti* (Alaska)
- D Nolan Seed (Alaska)
- D Nathan Rickey (Lindenwood)
- F Michael Citara (Alaska)
- F Jacob Fletcher (Lindenwood)
- F Noah Serdachny (Long Island)

* Most Valuable Player(s)
