= List of UCHC Most Valuable Player in Tournament =

Ice hockey award

United Collegiate Hockey Cup Most Valuable Player
- Sport: Ice hockey
- Awarded for: United Collegiate Hockey Cup Most Valuable Player

History
- First award: 2026
- Most recent: Lassi Lehti

The United Collegiate Hockey Cup Most Valuable Player is an annual award given out at the conclusion of the United Collegiate Hockey Cup to the best player in the tournament.

== Award winners ==
Year	Winner	Position	School	Ref
2026	Lassi Lehti	Goaltender	Alaska	

=== Winners by school ===
School	Winners
Alaska	1

=== Winners by position ===
Position	Winners
Goaltender	1

== See also ==
- UCHC All-Tournament Team
