= Keith Fisher =

American ice hockey coach

Current position
- Title: Head coach
- Team: Lindenwood
- Conference: Independent

Biographical details
- Born: Zim, Minnesota, U.S.
- Education: St. Cloud State University

Coaching career (HC unless noted)
- 2000–2002: Omaha Lancers (asst.)
- 2002–2004: River City Lancers (asst.)
- 2004–2005: Omaha Lancers (asst.)
- 2005–2011: Princeton (asst.)
- 2011–2018: Penn State (asst.)
- 2018–2025: Penn State (asoc.)
- 2025–present: Lindenwood

Head coaching record
- Overall: 15–15–0 (.500)

Keith Fisher is an American ice hockey head coach of the Lindenwood Lions men's ice hockey team.

== Early life ==
Fisher attended Cherry High School, where he played football. He then attended St. Cloud State University and graduated with a bachelor's degree in communications. He played two seasons of ice hockey at Hibbing Community College.

== Coaching career ==
Fisher began his coaching career for the Omaha Lancers of the United States Hockey League (USHL), where he served as the team's recruiting coordinator and academic advisor. He helped the Lancers win the Clark Cup in 2001 and Anderson Cup in 2002 and 2005. He then served as an assistant coach for Princeton from 2011 to 2018, under head coach Guy Gadowsky.

When Gadowsky was named head coach for Penn State, Fisher joined the staff as an assistant coach. On July 18, 2018, he was promoted to associate head coach at Penn State.

On June 9, 2025, Fisher was named the third head coach in Lindenwood team history.

== Head coaching record ==
Record table
Season	Team	Overall	Conference	Standing	Postseason
Lindenwood Lions Independent (2025–present)
2025–26	Lindenwood	15–15–0			UCHC Runner-Up
Lindenwood:		15–15–0			
Total:		15–15–0			
National champion Postseason invitational champion Conference regular season champion Conference regular season and conference tournament champion Division regular season champion Division regular season and conference tournament champion Conference tournament champion
