= Lindenwood Lions men's ice hockey =

- Current season
- University: Lindenwood University
- Conference: Independent
- First season: 2022–23
- Head coach: Keith Fisher; 2nd season, 15–15–0 (.500)
- Assistant coaches: Jack Combs; Andrew Magera; Mark Abney
- Arena: Centene Community Ice Center; Maryland Heights, Missouri
- Colors: Black and gold

ACHA tournament champions
- 2009, 2010, 2016, 2022

The Lindenwood Lions men's ice hockey team represents the Lindenwood University in NCAA Division I ice hockey. The program had won four club National Championships prior to its promotion to varsity status.

== History ==
=== ACHA Era ===
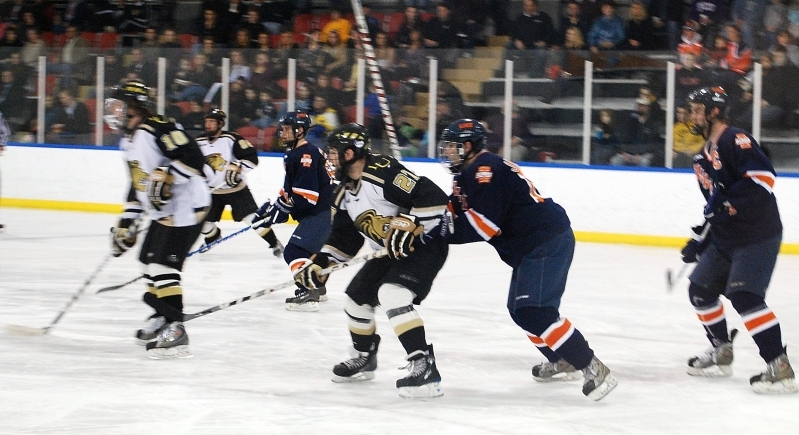
Lindenwood club hockey game vs. Illinois in 2010

Lindenwood founded its men's program as a club team in 2003 in the American Collegiate Hockey Association. From its inception, the Lions performed well on the ice, winning 25 out of 29 games in their first year. As the team's schedule increased in difficulty, head coach Derek Schaub kept the program in good standing with a 30-win season and championship game appearance in 2008. The following year, Lindenwood was a juggernaut, going 42–4 and winning their first championship while outscoring opponents 313 to 77. After a second dominating championship in 2010, Schaub stepped down and turned the team over to assistant coach and former NHL player, Rick Zombo. Under Zombo's leadership the Lions continued to be a national contender, reaching the championship in his first season and eventually winning their third title in 2016.

Despite the men's team's achievements, they were overshadowed by the women's team, which had won three consecutive ACHA championships and had been promoted to Division I in 2011. In 2021, the school announced its plan to have the men's team finally follow the Lady Lions into the varsity ranks, and the program began to transition in that direction. While the school did not officially state that the team would be a Division I program in 2022, multiple news reports indicated the program was on track to secure the needed funding for this timeline. The team's home, the Centene Community Ice Center, furthered the viability of a varsity program, as it held a seating capacity of 2,500 and was comparable to some other Division I arenas. In the 2021 offseason, the team also began seeing its first transfers into the program from Division I schools, demonstrating confidence in Lindenwood's progress. Lindenwood's promotion made the Lions the first Division I program in the St. Louis area since Saint Louis University discontinued their program in 1979. On March 23, 2022, Lindenwood officially announced that its men's ice hockey team would join Division I in the fall. The team finished its final club season with a 22–3 record and won their fourth ACHA National Championship.

=== NCAA Era ===
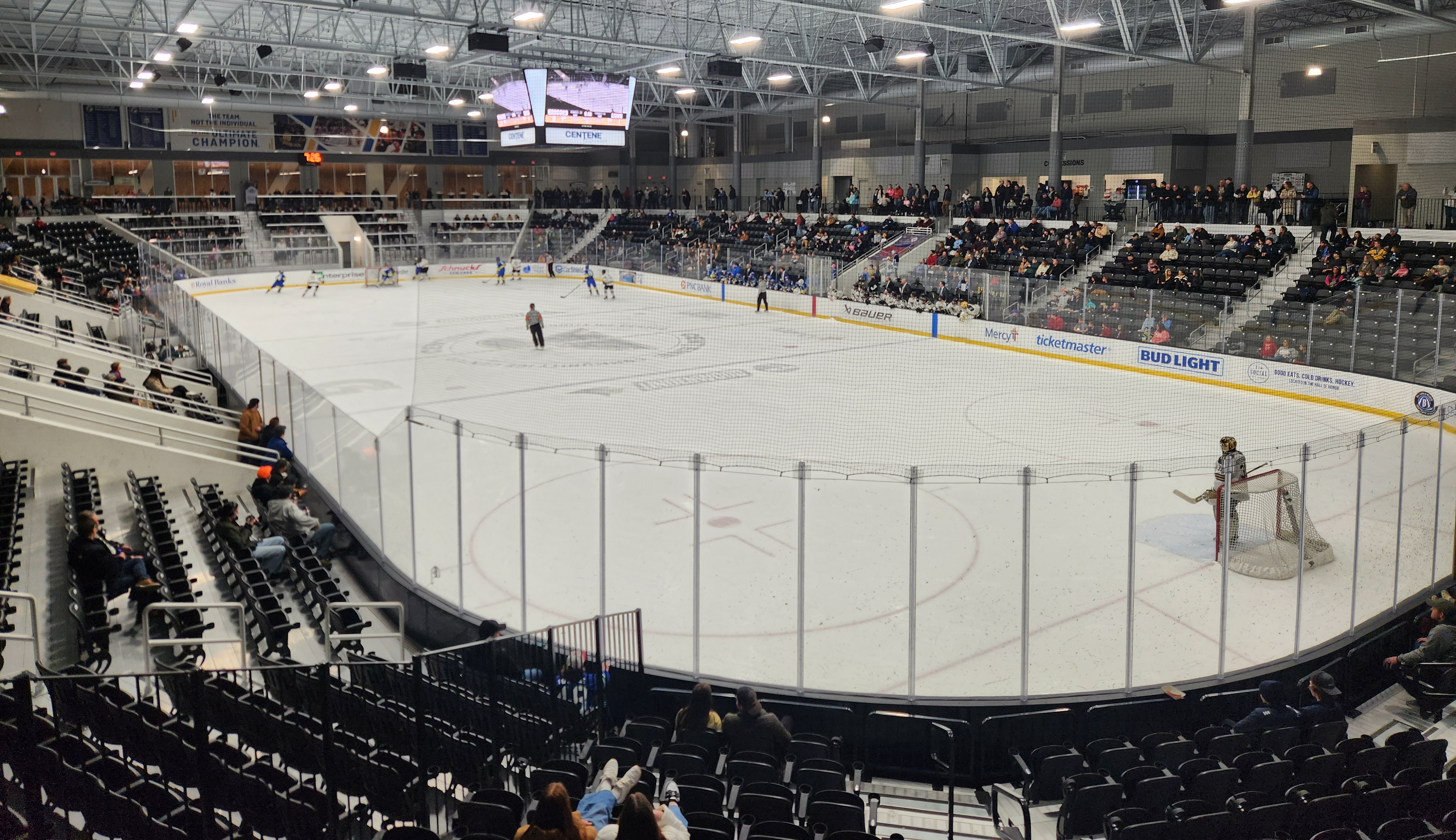
The Lions playing at the Centene Community Ice Center against Alaska during the 2024-25 season.

Lindenwood played their first NCAA hockey game, a 0–4 loss, against #2 Minnesota on October 1, 2022. The team's first varsity win would come two weeks later in the form of a 7–6 home win against Air Force. The Lions' first two seasons in Division I led to mixed results, as the team compiled a 13–40–5 record. Following the 2023–24 season, the university announced the firing of head coach Rick Zombo, ending his tenure at 14 seasons with the Lions as a head coach, between both ACHA and NCAA.

On April 23, 2024, the university announced that they had hired Michigan associate head coach Bill Muckalt as the second head coach in team history. The Lions' 2024–25 season immediately started on a high note, with the Lions earning a shocking 4–2 upset win at #9 Wisconsin in their first game. This was the Lions' first ever win over a ranked opponent. After this victory, the Lions held a record of 1–0–0, their first time with a winning record in program history. The Lions would finish the season with an 8–22–2 record, the most wins in team history. Following the season, Muckalt left the Lions to coach at Michigan Tech. On June 7, 2025, former Penn State associate head coach, Keith Fisher, was named the third head coach in team history.

Fisher's first season was an overall success, seeing the Lions hover around .500 for most of the season and recording a huge upset over #5 Denver, the highest ranked team the Lions have ever beaten. The Lions were ranked second amongst the Division I Independent teams by NPI, and headed into the inaugural United Collegiate Hockey Cup as the #2 seed, eventually falling in the championship match to Alaska by a score of 4-3 in overtime.

Lindenwood will be eligible for postseason participation in 2026–27.

== Coaches ==
Rick Zombo was retained as the team's head coach when it transitioned to Division I status in 2022. After two seasons, it was announced that he would not return.

As of the completion of 2025–26 season

Tenure	Coach	Years	Record	Pct.
2022–2024	Rick Zombo	2	13–40–5	.267
2024–2025	Bill Muckalt	1	8–22–2	.281
2025–present	Keith Fisher	1	15–15–0	.500
Totals	3 coach	4 seasons	36–77–7	.329

== Roster ==
As of August 24, 2025.

No.	Nat.	Player	Class	Pos	Height	Weight	DoB	Hometown	Previous team	NHL rights
3	(Canada)	Jonathan Wong	Freshman	D	5' 9" (1.75 m)	161 lb (73 kg)	2004-12-08	North Vancouver, British Columbia	Alberni Valley Bulldogs (BCHL)	—
4	(United States)	Connor Gengle	Freshman	D	5' 9" (1.75 m)	150 lb (68 kg)	2005-02-16	Grand Rapids, Michigan	Sherwood Park Crusaders (BCHL)	—
5	(United States)	Will Winemaster	Freshman	D	6' 3" (1.91 m)	205 lb (93 kg)	2003-11-17	Chicago, Illinois	Charlotte Rush (USPHL)	—
6	(Canada)	Giovanni Morneau	Sophomore	D	5' 9" (1.75 m)	168 lb (76 kg)	2003-06-17	Ottawa, Ontario	Carleton (OUA)	—
7	(United States)	Brady Yakesh	Sophomore	D	5' 9" (1.75 m)	179 lb (81 kg)	2003-09-15	Delano, Minnesota	Cowichan Valley Capitals (BCHL)	—
8	(United States)	Jacob Delaney	Freshman	D	6' 2" (1.88 m)	218 lb (99 kg)	2004-09-16	Glen Ellyn, Illinois	Sioux City Musketeers (USHL)	—
9	(Canada)	Drew Kuzma	Senior	F	6' 6" (1.98 m)	210 lb (95 kg)	2002-11-13	St. Albert, Alberta	Flin Flon Bombers (SJHL)	—
10	(United States)	Jacob Fletcher	Freshman	F	5' 9" (1.75 m)	170 lb (77 kg)	2004-07-28	Midland, Ontario	Cranbrook Bucks (BCHL)	—
11	(Canada)	Charles Savoie	Sophomore	F	6' 2" (1.88 m)	168 lb (76 kg)	2003-01-14	Saint-Eustache, Quebec	Concordia (OUA)	—
12	(Canada)	Ethan Zielke	Junior	D	5' 10" (1.78 m)	180 lb (82 kg)	2003-08-03	Calgary, Alberta	Humboldt Broncos (SJHL)	—
13	(Canada)	Adam Raesler	Sophomore	F	6' 0" (1.83 m)	165 lb (75 kg)	2003-06-23	Edmonton, Alberta	Sherwood Park Crusaders (BCHL)	—
14	(Canada)	John Evans	Junior	F	5' 10" (1.78 m)	150 lb (68 kg)	2002-04-08	South Surrey, British Columbia	Rensselaer (ECAC)	—
15	(United States)	Michael Bevilacqua	Junior	D	6' 0" (1.83 m)	187 lb (85 kg)	2003-01-26	Hamburg, New York	Bowling Green (CCHA)	—
16	(Canada)	Anselmo Rego	Freshman	F	5' 9" (1.75 m)	176 lb (80 kg)	2005-06-01	Brampton, Ontario	Penticton Vees (BCHL)	—
17	(United States)	Patrick Schmiedlin	Junior	F	6' 1" (1.85 m)	185 lb (84 kg)	2002-03-20	Culver, Indiana	Maine Nordiques (NAHL)	—
18	(United States)	Ethan Elias	Sophomore	D	5' 8" (1.73 m)	187 lb (85 kg)	2003-04-03	Maple Grove, Minnesota	St. Thomas (CCHA)	—
19	(Canada)	Louis-Philippe Fontaine	Freshman	F	5' 9" (1.75 m)	203 lb (92 kg)	2004-08-12	Chambly, Quebec	Shawinigan Cataractes (QMJHL)	—
20	(Canada)	Ty Hipkin	Sophomore	F	5' 11" (1.8 m)	181 lb (82 kg)	2000-03-31	High River, Alberta	Calgary Canucks (AJHL)	—
21	(Canada)	Jake Southgate	Junior	F	5' 11" (1.8 m)	185 lb (84 kg)	2002-11-04	North Battleford, Saskatchewan	Battlefords North Stars (SJHL)	—
22	(Canada)	Olivier Houde	Freshman	F	6' 1" (1.85 m)	181 lb (82 kg)	2004-01-02	Dosquet, Quebec	Victoriaville Tigres (QMJHL)	—
23	(Canada)	Jaeden Mercier	Junior	F	5' 11" (1.8 m)	170 lb (77 kg)	2002-02-12	Saskatoon, Saskatchewan	Flin Flon Bombers (SJHL)	—
24	(United States)	Nolan Seed	Junior	D	5' 11" (1.8 m)	168 lb (76 kg)	2002-04-24	Newboro, Ontario	Carleton (OUA)	—
26	(United States)	Tyler Loughman	Sophomore	F	5' 11" (1.8 m)	174 lb (79 kg)	2003-11-04	St. Louis, Missouri	Canmore Eagles (AJHL)	—
27	(United States)	Brady McIsaac	Freshman	F	5' 9" (1.75 m)	165 lb (75 kg)	2004-12-16	Prince George, British Columbia	Alberni Valley Bulldogs (BCHL)	—
28	(Canada)	Brody Mortensen	Sophomore	D	6' 1" (1.85 m)	185 lb (84 kg)	2004-09-07	Humboldt, Saskatchewan	Canmore Eagles (AJHL)	—
29	(United States)	Colin Ronan	Sophomore	G	6' 2" (1.88 m)	190 lb (86 kg)	2003-06-06	Saugus, Massachusetts	Maryland Black Bears (NAHL)	—
31	(United States)	Klayton Knapp	Sophomore	G	6' 0" (1.83 m)	190 lb (86 kg)	2003-10-07	Sylvania, Ohio	Minnesota Duluth (NCHC)	—
35	(United States)	Liam Beerman	Freshman	G	6' 0" (1.83 m)	165 lb (75 kg)	2004-09-30	Marquette, Michigan	Dubuque Fighting Saints (USHL)	—

== Statistical leaders ==
=== Career points leaders ===
Player	Years	GP	G	A	Pts	PIM
David Gagnon	2022–2025	90	32	42	74	64
Jake Southgate	2023–Present	88	20	32	52	34
Kyle Jeffers	2022–2024	54	16	21	37	30
Caige Sterzer	2022–2024	54	14	19	33	83
Ethan Zielke	2023–Present	85	13	19	32	46
Drew Kuzma	2022–Present	116	12	19	31	106
Giovanni Morneau	2025–Present	30	10	21	31	6
Jaeden Mercier	2023–Present	87	14	16	30	14
Hunter Johannes	2022–2023	28	13	16	29	87
Olivier Houde	2025–Present	30	13	15	28	26

=== Career goaltending leaders ===
GP = Games played; Min = Minutes played; W = Wins; L = Losses; T = Ties; GA = Goals against; SO = Shutouts; SV% = Save percentage; GAA = Goals against average

minimum 900 minutes played

Player	Years	GP	Min	W	L	T	GA	SO	SV%	GAA
Owen Bartoszkiewicz	2024–2025	29	1,729	8	20	1	74	2	.919	2.57
Trent Burnham	2022–2024	43	2,479	11	27	5	167	0	.904	4.04

Statistics current through the end of the 2025-26 season.

== Lions in professional hockey ==
- Daniel Walcott, NHL, defenceman/forward currently playing for the Tampa Bay Lightning organization.
