= Centene Community Ice Center =

Multi-purpose facility in Maryland Heights, Missouri

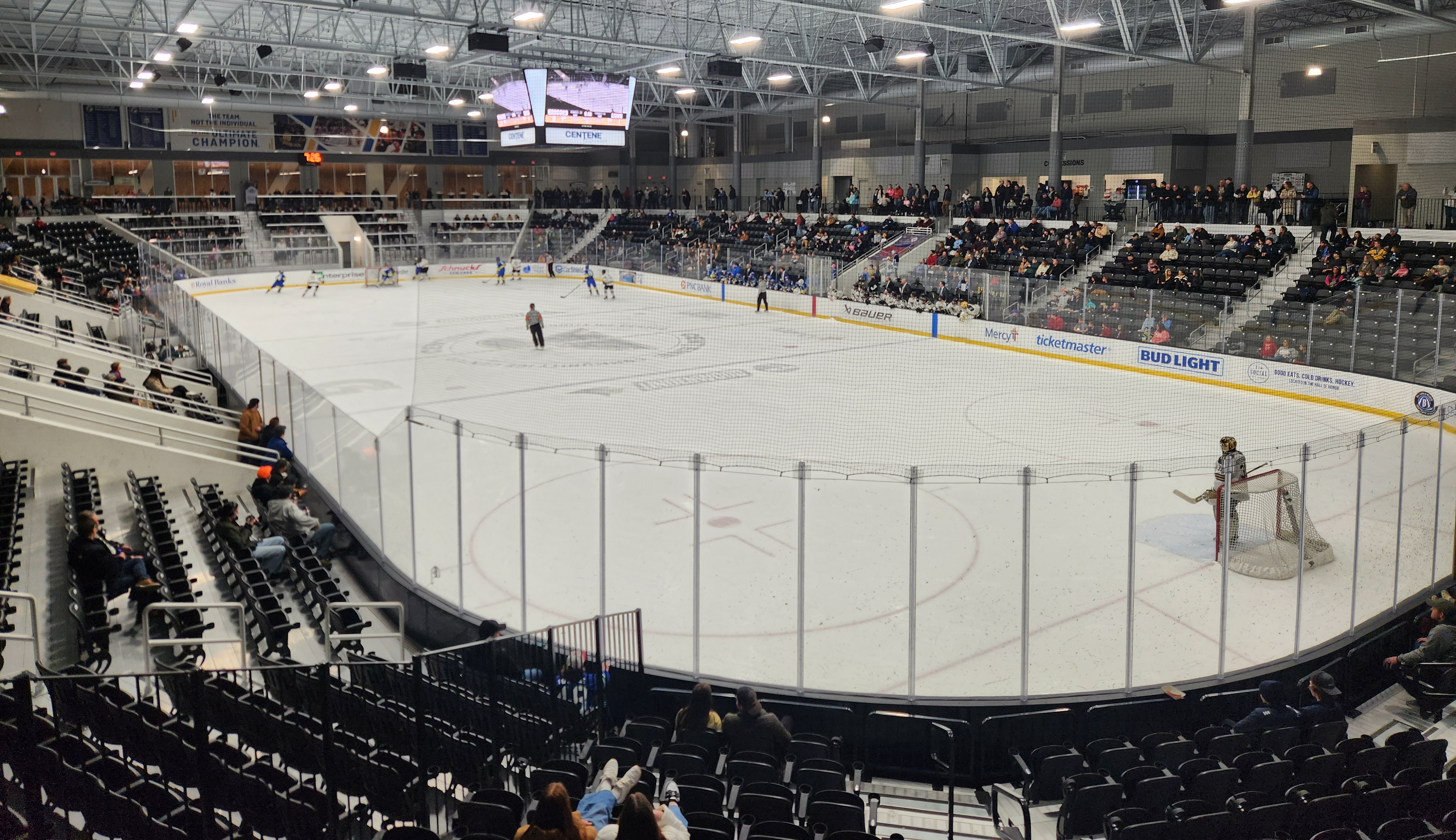
- Interactive map of Centene Community Ice Center
- Location: 750 Casino Center Dr. Maryland Heights, Missouri, 63043
- Coordinates: 38.749881°N 90.477536°W
- Owner: City of Maryland Heights
- Operator: Oak View Group
- Surface: (four) 200x85 feet (ice hockey)

Construction
- Opened: September 2019
- Cost: $83 million

Tenants
- St. Louis Blues; Lindenwood Lady Lions ice hockey Lindenwood Lions men's ice hockey

The Centene Community Ice Center is a multi-purpose facility in Maryland Heights, Missouri in greater St. Louis. It is located off Highway 141 near Hollywood Casino St. Louis and the Hollywood Casino Amphitheatre. Built at a cost of $83 million, the complex opened in September 2019. It is co-owned by the city of Maryland Heights and St. Louis County, and operated by Oak View Group.

The center features four rinks: a "feature" rink with 2,500 tip-up seats and a four-sided HD video scoreboard, the St. Louis Blues main practice rink with seating for 750, the Bob Plager Community Rink with bleacher seating for 400 and dedicated access for sled hockey, and "The Barn", a covered outdoor rink with a 4,000 seat grandstand. During the hockey off-season The Barn is converted into the St. Louis Music Park, a concert venue with a 4,500 capacity. The complex also contains a fitness center, sports medicine clinic, studios for WXOS radio, a Bauer Hockey retail shop, a bar named 314 Social, and a Schnucks Express grocery outlet. It is the practice facility for the St. Louis Blues, as well as home ice for Lindenwood University's men's and women's ice hockey teams.

Since 2020, it has hosted the St. Louis high school hockey city semi-finals, and since 2021 it has been the venue for the Challenge Cup and Wickenheiser Cup city championship games. It was the host of a 2024 NCAA Division I Men's Ice Hockey Tournament regional and has hosted the ACHA college club hockey nationals multiple times. The junior-level portion of the 2026 U.S. Figure Skating Championships was held in the main rink. Local hockey tenants include the St. Louis AAA Blues and Lady Blues elite programs, the Blues' affiliated disabled hockey teams (DASA Blues Sled Hockey, Gateway Locomotives Special Hockey, and Blues Blind Hockey), the St. Louis Lady Cyclones girls' hockey club, and in-house programs such as learn-to-skate, learn-to-play, and recreational leagues.
