= 2025–26 NCAA Division I men's ice hockey rankings =

- NCAA tournament: 2026
- NCAA champion: Denver
- Preseason No. 1 (USCHO): Western Michigan
- Preseason No. 1 (USA Hockey): Western Michigan
- NCAA Division I men's ice hockey rankings

Two human polls made up the 2025–26 NCAA Division I men's ice hockey rankings, the USCHO.com poll and the USA Hockey College Hockey poll. As the 2025–26 season progressed, rankings were updated weekly.

== Legend ==
	Increase in ranking
	Decrease in ranking
	Not ranked previous week
Italics	Number of first place votes
(#-#)	Win–loss–tie record
т	Tied with team above or below also with this symbol

== USCHO ==
	Preseason Sep 22	Week 1 Oct 6	Week 2 Oct 13	Week 3 Oct 20	Week 4 Oct 27	Week 5 Nov 3	Week 6 Nov 10	Week 7 Nov 17	Week 8 Nov 24	Week 9 Dec 1	Week 10 Dec 8	Week 11 Dec 15	Week 13 Dec 29	Week 14 Jan 5	Week 15 Jan 12	Week 16 Jan 19	Week 17 Jan 26	Week 18 Feb 2	Week 19 Feb 9	Week 20 Feb 16	Week 21 Feb 23	Week 22 Mar 2	Week 23 Mar 9	Week 24 Mar 16	Week 25 Mar 23	Final Apr 13	
1.	Western Michigan (29)	Western Michigan (0–0–0) (32)	Boston University (2–0–1) (27)	Michigan State (3–1–0) (29)	Michigan State (5–1–0) (45)	Michigan State (5–1–0) (42)	Michigan State (7–1–0) (50)	Michigan State (9–1–0) (50)	Michigan (13–3–0) (43)	Michigan (15–3–0) (42)	Michigan (16–4–0) (26)	Michigan (16–4–0) (36)	Michigan (16–4–0) (38)	Michigan (16–4–0) (46)	Michigan (18–4–0) (46)	Michigan (20–4–0) (49)	Michigan (20–4–0) (48)	Michigan (22–4–0) (48)	Michigan State (22–6–0) (30)	Michigan State (22–6–0) (37)	Michigan State (24–6–0) (49)	Michigan (26–7–1) (24)	Michigan (26–7–1) (30)	Michigan (28–7–1) (50)	Michigan (29–7–1) (50)	Denver (29–11–3) (50)	1.
2.	Boston University (3)	Michigan State (0–0–0) (11)	Western Michigan (1–1–0) (6)	Western Michigan (3–1–0) (9)	Michigan (7–1–0) (2)	Michigan (9–1–0) (5)	Michigan (10–2–0)	Michigan (11–3–0)	Wisconsin (10–2–2) (3)	Wisconsin (10–2–2) (4)	Wisconsin (12–2–2) (21)	Wisconsin (12–2–2) (13)	Wisconsin (13–2–2) (12)	Michigan State (12–4–0) (2)	Wisconsin (15–3–2) (3)	Michigan State (17–5–0)	Michigan State (19–5–0) (1)	Michigan State (21–5–0) (2)	Michigan (23–5–0) (18)	Michigan (24–5–1) (10)	Michigan (25–6–1) (1)	Michigan State (24–7–1) (11)	North Dakota (27–8–1) (12)	North Dakota (27–9–1)	North Dakota (27–9–1)	Wisconsin (24-13-2)	2.
3.	Michigan State (14)	Boston University (1–0–0) (2)	Michigan State (1–1–0) (5)	Michigan (6–0–0) (11)	Western Michigan (4–2–0) (1)	Penn State (9–1–0) (3)	Minnesota Duluth (10–2–0)	Denver (8–3–1)	Michigan State (9–3–0) (5)	Michigan State (11–3–0) (3)	Michigan State (12–4–0) (2)	Michigan State (12–4–0) (1)	Michigan State (12–4–0)	Wisconsin (13–3–2) (1)	Western Michigan (16–6–0) (1)	Western Michigan (16–6–0) (1)	Western Michigan (18–6–0) (1)	North Dakota (20–6–0)	North Dakota (21–7–0)	North Dakota (23–7–0)	North Dakota (24–7–1)	North Dakota (25–8–1) (14)	Michigan State (25–7–2) (7)	Michigan State (25–8–2)	Michigan State (25–8–2)	Michigan (31-8-1)	3.
4.	Denver	Penn State (2–0–0) (4)	Michigan (4–0–0) (8)	Boston University (2–2–1)	Penn State (7–1–0) (2)	Western Michigan (5–3–0)	Denver (6–3–1)	Minnesota Duluth (11–3–0)	Denver (9–4–1)	Minnesota Duluth (12–4–0)	North Dakota (12–4–0)	North Dakota (14–4–0)	North Dakota (14–4–0)	North Dakota (16–4–0)	Michigan State (15–5–0)	North Dakota (18–6–0)	North Dakota (20–6–0) (1)	Western Michigan (19–7–0)	Western Michigan (20–8–0)	Western Michigan (22–8–0)	Western Michigan (23–8–1)	Western Michigan (24–9–1) (1)	Western Michigan (26–9–1) (1)	Denver (24–11–3)	Denver (25–11–3)	North Dakota (29-10-1)	4.
5.	Penn State (3)	Denver (0–0–0)	Denver (1–0–1)	Penn State (5–1–0) (1)	Boston University (3–3–1)	Quinnipiac (5–2–1)	Penn State (9–3–0)	Penn State (10–4–0)	Minnesota Duluth (12–4–0)	North Dakota (10–4–0)	Minnesota Duluth (13–5–0)	Minnesota Duluth (14–6–0)	Minnesota Duluth (14–6–0)	Minnesota Duluth (14–6–0)	North Dakota (17–5–0)	Wisconsin (15–5–2)	Penn State (18–6–0)	Quinnipiac (20–5–3)	Quinnipiac (22–5–3) (2)	Quinnipiac (24–5–3) (3)	Penn State (20–9–1)	Providence (22–9–2)	Providence (23–9–2)	Western Michigan (26–10–1)	Western Michigan (26–10–1)	Michigan State (26-9-2)	5.
6.	Boston College	Maine (0–0–0)	Penn State (3–1–0) (1)	Quinnipiac (3–1–1)	Denver (3–2–1)	Maine (5–2–1)	North Dakota (7–3–0)	North Dakota (8–4–0)	North Dakota (8–4–0)	Denver (9–5–1)	Denver (11–5–1)	Denver (12–6–1)	Denver (12–6–1)	Western Michigan (14–6–0) (1)	Minnesota Duluth (16–6–0)	Quinnipiac (18–4–2)	Quinnipiac (19–5–2)	Penn State (18–8–0)	Penn State (18–8–0)	Penn State (18–9–1)	Providence (21–8–2)	Penn State (20–10–2)	Denver (23–11–3)	Minnesota Duluth (23–13–1)	Minnesota Duluth (23–14–1)	Western Michigan (27-11-1)	6.
7.	Maine	Providence (0–0–0)	Maine (2–0–0) (3)	Denver (2–1–1)	Quinnipiac (5–2–1)	Minnesota Duluth (8–2–0)	Wisconsin (7–1–2)	Wisconsin (8–2–2)	Western Michigan (9–5–0)	Western Michigan (9–5–0)	Western Michigan (10–6–0)	Western Michigan (10–6–0)	Western Michigan (11–6–0)	Denver (12–7–2)	Quinnipiac (16–4–2)	Minnesota Duluth (17–7–0)	Minnesota Duluth (17–9–0)	Providence (16–7–2)	Providence (18–7–2)	Providence (19–8–2)	Quinnipiac (25–6–3)	Denver (21–11–3)	Quinnipiac (26–7–3)	Providence (23–10–2)	Providence (23–10–2)	Minnesota Duluth (24–15–1)	7.
8.	Minnesota	Quinnipiac (1–0–0)	North Dakota (2–0–0)	North Dakota (3–1–0)	North Dakota (4–2–0)	North Dakota (5–3–0)	Maine (6–3–1)	Western Michigan (7–5–0)	Quinnipiac (9–3–2)	Quinnipiac (11–3–2)	Dartmouth (10–0–0) (1)	Dartmouth (11–1–0)	Penn State (11–5–0)	Quinnipiac (14–4–2)	Penn State (14–6–0)	Penn State (16–6–0)	Wisconsin (15–7–2)	Denver (16–11–2)	Denver (17–11–3)	Denver (19–11–3)	Denver (19–11–3)	Quinnipiac (26–7–3)	Minnesota Duluth (22–13–1)	Cornell (22–9–1)	Dartmouth (23–7–4)	Quinnipiac (27-10-3)	8.
9.	Providence	Michigan (2–0–0) (1)	Boston College (1–1–1)	Boston College (2–1–1)	Connecticut (3–3–0)	Denver (4–3–1)	Western Michigan (5–5–0)	Quinnipiac (7–3–2)	Penn State (11–5–0)	Penn State (11–5–0)	Penn State (11–5–0)	Penn State (11–5–0)	Dartmouth (12–2–0)	Penn State (12–6–0)	Denver (12–9–2)	Denver (13–10–2)	Providence (15–7–2)	Cornell (16–5–0)	Cornell (17–6–0)	Minnesota Duluth (18–12–0)	Minnesota Duluth (20–12–0)	Cornell (20–8–1)	Cornell (20–8–1)	Dartmouth (21–7–4)	Cornell (22–10–1)	Providence (23-11-2)	9.
10.	Connecticut	North Dakota (0–0–0)	Quinnipiac (2–1–0)	Maine (2–1–1)	Minnesota Duluth (7–1–0)	Wisconsin (6–0–2)	Quinnipiac (6–3–2)	Maine (7–4–1)	Maine (8–5–1)	Dartmouth (8–0–0) (1)	Quinnipiac (12–4–2)	Quinnipiac (12–4–2)	Quinnipiac (12–4–2)	Connecticut (11–5–3)	Dartmouth (13–4–0)	Dartmouth (14–4–1)	Cornell (14–5–0)	Minnesota Duluth (17–11–0)	Minnesota Duluth (18–12–0)	Connecticut (17–7–4)	Boston College (19–10–1)	Minnesota Duluth (20–13–1)	Penn State (20–12–2) т	Penn State (21–13–2) т	Penn State (21–13–2)	Dartmouth (23-8-4)	10.
11.	North Dakota	Boston College (0–1–0)	Massachusetts (3–0–0)	Connecticut (2–2–0)	Boston College (2–2–1)	Connecticut (4–3–1)	Northeastern (7–1–0)	Connecticut (6–4–2)	Northeastern (8–4–0)	Maine (8–5–1)	Northeastern (10–5–0)	Connecticut (9–5–3)	Connecticut (9–5–3)	Dartmouth (12–4–0)	Connecticut (12–6–3)	Providence (13–7–2)	Denver (14–11–2)	Boston College (14–8–1)	Connecticut (16–7–3)	Cornell (17–7–1)	Cornell (18–8–1)	Wisconsin (19–11–2)	Wisconsin (21–11–2) т	Quinnipiac (26–9–3) т	Quinnipiac (26–9–3)	Penn State (21-14-2)	11.
12.	Michigan (1)	Minnesota (1–1–0)	Connecticut (1–1–0)	Minnesota (2–3–1)	Maine (3–2–1)	Boston University (3–5–1)	Massachusetts (7–4–0)	Northeastern (7–3–0)	Connecticut (7–5–2)	Northeastern (9–4–0)	Connecticut (9–5–3)	Boston College (10–5–1)	Northeastern (10–6–0)	Maine (12–7–2)	Boston College (11–6–1)	Cornell (12–5–0)	Connecticut (15–7–3)	Connecticut (15–7–3)	Dartmouth (17–6–1)	Boston College (16–10–1)	Wisconsin (19–11–2)	Dartmouth (19–7–4)	Dartmouth (19–7–4)	Wisconsin (21–12–2)	Wisconsin (21–12–2)	Cornell (22-11-1)	12.
13.	Quinnipiac	Connecticut (1–1–0)	Minnesota (1–2–1)	Massachusetts (4–1–0)	Massachusetts (5–2–0)	Massachusetts (6–3–0)	Boston University (5–5–1)	Dartmouth (6–0–0)	Dartmouth (6–0–0)	Minnesota State (10–2–4)	Boston College (10–5–1)	Northeastern (10–6–0)	Boston College (10–6–1)	Boston College (11–6–1)	Cornell (11–4–0)	Connecticut (13–7–3)	Boston College (13–8–1)	Wisconsin (15–9–2)	Wisconsin (17–9–2)	Wisconsin (18–10–2)	Connecticut (17–9–4)	Boston College (19–12–1)	Augustana (22–10–4)	Connecticut (19–11–5)	Connecticut (20–12–5)	Connecticut (20–13–5)	13.
14.	Arizona State	Massachusetts (2–0–0)	Providence (0–2–0)	Ohio State (3–1–0)	Wisconsin (4–0–2)	Northeastern (5–1–0)	Connecticut (4–4–2)	Minnesota State (6–2–4)	Minnesota State (8–2–4)	Connecticut (7–5–3)	Minnesota State (11–3–4)	Maine (11–7–1)	Minnesota State (11–4–5)	Cornell (9–4–0)	Providence (11–7–2)	Augustana (16–6–3)	Dartmouth (14–6–1)	Dartmouth (16–6–1)	Boston College (15–9–1)	Dartmouth (17–7–2)	Dartmouth (18–7–3)	Connecticut (17–10–5)	Connecticut (18–11–5)	Massachusetts (22–12–1)	Minnesota State (22–10–7)	Minnesota State (22-11-7)	14.
15.	Massachusetts	Arizona State (0–2–0)	Arizona State (2–2–0)	Providence (1–2–0)	Colorado College (5–1–0)	Providence (3–3–1)	Providence (4–3–2)	Boston College (6–4–1)	Boston College (7–5–1)	Boston College (8–5–1)	Maine (8–7–1)	Minnesota State (11–4–5)	Maine (11–7–1)	Minnesota State (12–5–5)	Augustana (14–6–3)	Boston College (11–8–1)	St. Thomas (16–7–3)	St. Thomas (17–8–3)	St. Thomas (18–9–3)	St. Thomas (18–9–3)	Augustana (20–10–4)	Augustana (20–10–4)	Massachusetts (21–12–1)	St. Thomas (21–11–5)	Massachusetts (22–13–1)	Merrimack (21-16-2)	15.
16.	Ohio State	Ohio State (0–0–0)	Ohio State (2–0–0)	Colorado College (5–1–0)	Providence (2–2–1)	Minnesota State (4–2–2)	Minnesota State (4–2–4)	Providence (5–4–2)	Providence (6–5–2)	Providence (7–6–2)	Providence (7–6–2)	Providence (8–6–2)	Providence (8–6–2)	Northeastern (10–7–0)	Maine (12–9–2)	St. Thomas (14–7–3)	Augustana (16–7–3)	Augustana (18–7–3)	Minnesota State (15–8–5)	Michigan Tech (21–10–3)	Michigan Tech (21–10–3)	Minnesota State (18–9–7)	Minnesota State (20–10–7)	Minnesota State (21–10–7)	Merrimack (21-15-2)	Massachusetts (22-13-1)	16.
17.	Cornell	Cornell (0–0–0)	Wisconsin (2–0–0)	Wisconsin (2–0–2)	Ohio State (4–2–0)	Cornell (1–1–0)	Colorado College (6–3–1)	Massachusetts (7–6–0)	Cornell (6–2–0)	Cornell (6–3–0)	Cornell (7–4–0)	Cornell (7–4–0)	Cornell (7–4–0)	Augustana (12–6–3)	Minnesota State (12–6–5)	Maine (12–9–2)	Maine (14–9–2)	Minnesota State (15–8–5)	Michigan Tech (20–10–2)	Minnesota State (16–9–5)	St. Thomas (18–10–4)	Massachusetts (19–12–1)	Boston College (19–14–1)	Boston College (20–14–1)	St. Thomas (21–12–5)	Augustana (22-11-4)	17.
18.	Minnesota State	Wisconsin (2–0–0)	Cornell (0–0–0)	Minnesota Duluth (5–1–0)	Minnesota State (3–1–2)	Boston College (2–4–1)	Boston College (4–4–1)	Boston University (5–6–1)	Massachusetts (8–7–0)	Boston University (7–7–1)	Harvard (7–3–1)	Harvard (7–3–1)	Harvard (7–3–1)	Providence (9–7–2)	Princeton (11–5–0)	Boston University (12–10–1)	Minnesota State (13–8–5)	Maine (14–10–2)	Augustana (18–9–3)	Augustana (19–10–3)	Minnesota State (17–9–6)	Maine (18-12-3)	St. Thomas (20–11–5)	Augustana (22–11–4)	Augustana (22–11–4)	St. Thomas (21-12-5)	18.
19.	St. Thomas	St. Thomas (1–0–0)	Colorado College (3–1–0)	Cornell (0–0–0)	Minnesota (2–5–1)	Ohio State (4–4–0)	Dartmouth (4–0–0)	Cornell (4–2–0)	Boston University (6–7–1)	Miami (10–4–0)	Colorado College (8–7–1)	Boston University (9–8–1)	Boston University (9–8–1)	Boston University (9–8–1)	St. Thomas (12–7–3)	Michigan Tech (16–8–2)	Michigan Tech (17–9–2)	Massachusetts (16–10–0)	Massachusetts (17–11–0)	Massachusetts (17–11–0)	Massachusetts (18–12–0)	St. Thomas (18–11–5)	Michigan Tech (23–12–3)	Ohio State (14–20–2)	Boston College (20–15–1)	Boston College (20-15-1)	19.
20.	Wisconsin	Minnesota State (0–0–0)	Minnesota State (1–1–0)	Minnesota State (1–1–2)	Cornell (0–0–0)	Colorado College (5–3–0)	Cornell (2–2–0)	Union (8–2–1)	Union (8–3–2)	Colorado College (8–7–1)	Boston University (8–8–1)	Union (12–5–2)	Union (12–5–2)	Princeton (10–4–0)	Boston University (10–9–1)	Minnesota State (12–8–5)	St. Cloud State (13–13–0)	Michigan Tech (18–10–2)	Miami (17–9–2)	Miami (17–11–2)	Maine (16-12-3)	Michigan Tech (21–12–3)	Union (22-10-3)	Bentley (22-11-5)	Bentley (23-11-5)	Bentley (23-12-5)	20.
	Preseason Sep 22	Week 1 Oct 6	Week 2 Oct 13	Week 3 Oct 20	Week 4 Oct 27	Week 5 Nov 3	Week 6 Nov 10	Week 7 Nov 17	Week 8 Nov 24	Week 9 Dec 1	Week 10 Dec 8	Week 11 Dec 15	Week 13 Dec 29	Week 14 Jan 5	Week 15 Jan 12	Week 16 Jan 19	Week 17 Jan 26	Week 18 Feb 2	Week 19 Feb 9	Week 20 Feb 16	Week 21 Feb 23	Week 22 Mar 2	Week 23 Mar 9	Week 24 Mar 16	Week 25 Mar 23	Final Apr 13	
		None	Dropped: St. Thomas	Dropped: Arizona State	None	Dropped: Minnesota	Dropped: Ohio State	Dropped: Colorado College	None	Dropped: Massachusetts; Union	Dropped: Miami	Dropped: Colorado College	None	Dropped: Harvard; Union	Dropped: Northeastern	Dropped: Princeton	Dropped: Boston University	Dropped: St. Cloud State	Dropped: Maine	None	Dropped: Miami	None	Dropped: Maine	Dropped: Michigan Tech; Union	Dropped: Ohio State	None	

== USA Hockey ==
	Preseason Sep 29	Week 1 Oct 6	Week 2 Oct 13	Week 3 Oct 20	Week 4 Oct 27	Week 5 Nov 3	Week 6 Nov 10	Week 7 Nov 17	Week 8 Nov 24	Week 9 Dec 1	Week 10 Dec 8	Week 11 Dec 15	Week 13 Dec 29	Week 14 Jan 5	Week 15 Jan 12	Week 16 Jan 19	Week 17 Jan 26	Week 18 Feb 2	Week 19 Feb 9	Week 20 Feb 16	Week 21 Feb 23	Week 22 Mar 2	Week 23 Mar 9	Week 24 Mar 16	Week 25 Mar 23	Week 26 Mar 30	Final Apr 13	
1.	Western Michigan (22)	Western Michigan (0–0–0) (24)	Boston University (2–0–1) (19)	Michigan State (3–1–0) (17)	Michigan State (5–1–0) (32)	Michigan State (5–1–0) (30)	Michigan State (7–1–0) (34)	Michigan State (9–1–0) (34)	Michigan (13–3–0) (34)	Michigan (15–3–0) (33)	Michigan (16–4–0) (17)	Michigan (16–4–0) (29)	Michigan (16–4–0) (30)	Michigan (16–4–0) (34)	Michigan (18–4–0) (34)	Michigan (20–4–0) (34)	Michigan (20–4–0) (34)	Michigan (22–4–0) (34)	Michigan State (22–6–0) (18)	Michigan State (22–6–0) (25)	Michigan State (24–6–0) (30)	Michigan (26–7–1) (26)	Michigan (26–7–1) (21)	Michigan (28–7–1) (34)	Michigan (29–7–1) (34)	Michigan (31–7–1) (28)	Denver (29-11-3) (34)	1.
2.	Boston University (4)	Michigan State (0–0–0) (3)	Western Michigan (1–1–0) (4)	Western Michigan (3–1–0) (5)	Michigan (7–1–0) (2)	Michigan (9–1–0) (4)	Michigan (10–2–0)	Michigan (11–3–0)	Wisconsin (10–2–2)	Wisconsin (10–2–2)	Wisconsin (12–2–2) (16)	Wisconsin (12–2–2) (5)	Wisconsin (13–2–2) (4)	Michigan State (12–4–0)	Wisconsin (15–3–2)	Michigan State (17–5–0)	Michigan State (19–5–0)	Michigan State (21–5–0)	Michigan (23–5–0) (15)	Michigan (24–5–1) (7)	Michigan (25–6–1) (4)	North Dakota (25–8–1) (7)	North Dakota (27–8–1) (10)	North Dakota (27–9–1)	North Dakota (27–9–1)	North Dakota (29–9–1) (6)	Wisconsin (24-13-2)	2.
3.	Michigan State (6)	Boston University (1–0–0) (4)	Michigan (4–0–0) (9)	Michigan (6–0–0) (12)	Western Michigan (4–2–0)	Penn State (9–1–0)	Minnesota Duluth (10–2–0)	Denver (8–3–1)	Michigan State (9–3–0)	Michigan State (11–3–0)	Michigan State (12–4–0)	Michigan State (12–4–0)	Michigan State (14–4–0)	Wisconsin (13–3–2)	Michigan State (15–5–0)	Western Michigan (16–6–0)	Western Michigan (18–6–0)	North Dakota (20–6–0)	North Dakota (21–7–0)	North Dakota (23–7–0)	North Dakota (24–7–1)	Michigan State (24–7–1) (1)	Michigan State (25–7–2) (3)	Michigan State (25–8–2)	Michigan State (25–8–2)	Denver (27–11–3)	Michigan (31-8-1)	3.
4.	Denver	Penn State (2–0–0) (2)	Michigan State (1–1–0) (1)	Boston University (2–2–1)	Penn State (7–1–0)	Western Michigan (5–3–0)	Denver (6–3–1)	Minnesota Duluth (11–3–0)	Denver (9–4–1)	Minnesota Duluth (12–4–0)	Minnesota Duluth (13–5–0)	North Dakota (14–4–0)	North Dakota (14–4–0)	North Dakota (16–4–0)	Western Michigan (16–6–0)	North Dakota (18–6–0)	North Dakota (20–6–0)	Western Michigan (19–7–0)	Western Michigan (20–8–0)	Western Michigan (22–8–0)	Western Michigan (23–8–1)	Western Michigan (24–9–1)	Western Michigan (26–9–1)	Denver (24–11–3)	Denver (25–11–3)	Wisconsin (23–12–2)	North Dakota (29-10-1)	4.
5.	Penn State (1)	Denver (0–0–0)	Denver (1–0–1)	Penn State (5–1–0)	Boston University (3–3–1)	Quinnipiac (5–2–1)	Penn State (9–3–0)	Penn State (10–4–0)	Minnesota Duluth (12–4–0)	Denver (9–5–1)	Denver (11–5–1)	Minnesota Duluth (14–6–0)	Minnesota Duluth (14–6–0)	Minnesota Duluth (14–6–0)	North Dakota (17–5–0)	Wisconsin (15–5–2)	Penn State (18–6–0)	Quinnipiac (20–5–3)	Quinnipiac (22–5–3) (1)	Quinnipiac (24–5–3) (2)	Penn State (20–9–1)	Providence (22–9–2)	Providence (23–9–2)	Western Michigan (26–10–1)	Western Michigan (26–10–1)	Michigan State (26–9–2)	Michigan State (26–9–2)	5.
6.	Boston College	Providence (0–0–0)	Penn State (3–1–0)	Quinnipiac (3–1–1)	Quinnipiac (5–2–1)	Maine (5–2–1)	North Dakota (7–3–0)	North Dakota (8–4–0)	North Dakota (8–4–0)	North Dakota (10–4–0)	North Dakota (12–4–0)	Denver (12–6–1)	Denver (12–6–1)	Western Michigan (14–6–0)	Minnesota Duluth (16–6–0)	Minnesota Duluth (17–7–0)	Quinnipiac (19–5–2)	Penn State (18–8–0)	Providence (18–7–2)	Penn State (18–9–1)	Providence (21–8–2)	Penn State (20–10–2)	Denver (23–11–3)	Minnesota Duluth (23–13–1)	Minnesota Duluth (23–14–1)	Western Michigan (27–11–1)	Western Michigan (27–11–1)	6.
7.	Minnesota	Michigan (2–0–0) (1)	Maine (2–0–0) (1)	Denver (2–1–1)	Denver (3–2–1)	Minnesota Duluth (8–2–0)	Wisconsin (7–1–2)	Western Michigan (7–5–0)	Western Michigan (9–5–0)	Western Michigan (9–5–0)	Dartmouth (10–0–0) (1)	Dartmouth (11–1–0)	Western Michigan (11–6–0)	Denver (12–7–2)	Quinnipiac (16–4–2)	Quinnipiac (18–4–2)	Wisconsin (15–7–2)	Providence (16–7–2)	Penn State (18–8–0)	Providence (19–8–2)	Quinnipiac (25–6–3)	Denver (21–11–3)	Quinnipiac (26–7–3)	Providence (23–10–2)	Providence (23–10–2)	Minnesota Duluth (24–15–1)	Minnesota Duluth (24–15–1)	7.
8.	Maine т	Maine (0–0–0)	North Dakota (2–0–0)	North Dakota (3–1–0)	North Dakota (4–2–0)	North Dakota (5–3–0)	Western Michigan (5–5–0)	Wisconsin (8–2–2)	Quinnipiac (9–3–2)	Quinnipiac (11–3–2)	Western Michigan (10–6–0)	Western Michigan (10–6–0)	Dartmouth (12–2–0)	Quinnipiac (14–4–2)	Penn State (14–6–0)	Penn State (16–6–0)	Minnesota Duluth (17–9–0)	Cornell (16–5–0)	Denver (17–11–3)	Denver (19–11–3)	Denver (19–11–3)	Quinnipiac (26–7–3)	Minnesota Duluth (22–13–1)	Cornell (22–9–1)	Dartmouth (23–7–4)	Quinnipiac (27–10–3)	Quinnipiac (27–10–3)	8.
9.	Providence т	Quinnipiac (1–0–0)	Boston College (1–1–1)	Boston College (2–1–1)	Connecticut (3–3–0)	Wisconsin (6–0–2)	Quinnipiac (6–3–2)	Quinnipiac (7–3–2)	Penn State (11–5–0)	Penn State (11–5–0)	Penn State (11–5–0)	Penn State (11–5–0)	Penn State (11–5–0)	Penn State (12–6–0)	Dartmouth (13–4–0)	Denver (13–10–2)	Providence (15–7–2)	Denver (16–11–2)	Minnesota Duluth (18–12–0)	Minnesota Duluth (18–12–0)	Minnesota Duluth (20–12–0)	Cornell (20–8–1)	Cornell (20–8–1)	Dartmouth (21–7–4)	Penn State (21–13–2)	Providence (23–11–2)	Providence (23–11–2)	9.
10.	Connecticut т	Boston College (0–1–0)	Quinnipiac (2–1–0)	Maine (2–1–1)	Boston College (2–2–1)	Connecticut (4–3–1)	Maine (6–3–1)	Connecticut (6–4–2)	Dartmouth (6–0–0)	Dartmouth (8–0–0) (1)	Quinnipiac (12–4–2)	Quinnipiac (12–4–2)	Quinnipiac (12–4–2)	Dartmouth (12–4–0)	Denver (12–9–2)	Dartmouth (14–4–1)	Cornell (14–5–0)	Minnesota Duluth (17–11–0)	Cornell (17–6–0)	Cornell (17–7–1)	Cornell (18–8–1)	Minnesota Duluth (20–13–1)	Penn State (20–12–2)	Quinnipiac (26–9–3)	Quinnipiac (26–9–3)	Dartmouth (23–8–4)	Dartmouth (23–8–4)	10.
11.	North Dakota т	North Dakota (0–0–0)	Massachusetts (3–0–0)	Connecticut (2–2–0)	Minnesota Duluth (7–1–0)	Denver (4–3–1)	Northeastern (7–1–0)	Maine (7–4–1)	Maine (8–5–1)	Northeastern (9–4–0)	Northeastern (10–5–0)	Connecticut (9–5–3)	Connecticut (9–5–3)	Connecticut (10–5–3)	Connecticut (11–6–3)	Providence (13–7–2)	Denver (14–11–2)	Wisconsin (15–9–2)	Connecticut (16–7–3)	Connecticut (17–7–4)	Boston College (19–10–1)	Wisconsin (19–11–2)	Wisconsin (21–11–2)	Penn State (21–13–2)	Cornell (22–10–1)	Penn State (21–14–2)	Penn State (21–14–2)	11.
12.	Michigan (1)	Minnesota (1–1–0)	Connecticut (1–1–0)	Minnesota (2–3–1)	Maine (3–2–1)	Massachusetts (6–3–0)	Boston University (5–5–1)	Northeastern (7–3–0)	Northeastern (8–4–0)	Maine (8–5–1)	Boston College (10–5–1)	Boston College (10–5–1)	Northeastern (10–6–0)	Cornell (9–4–0)	Cornell (11–4–0)	Cornell (12–5–0)	Connecticut (15–7–3)	Connecticut (15–7–3)	Wisconsin (17–9–2)	Dartmouth (17–7–2)	Dartmouth (18–7–3)	Dartmouth (19–7–4)	Dartmouth (19–7–4)	Wisconsin (21–12–2)	Wisconsin (21–12–2)	Cornell (22–11–1)	Cornell (22–11–1)	12.
13.	Quinnipiac	Connecticut (1–1–0)	Providence (0–2–0)	Massachusetts (4–1–0)	Massachusetts (5–2–0)	Boston University (3–5–1)	Connecticut (4–4–2) т	Dartmouth (6–0–0)	Connecticut (7–5–2)	Minnesota State (10–2–4)	Connecticut (9–5–3)	Northeastern (10–6–0)	Boston College (10–6–1)	Boston College (11–6–1)	Boston College (11–6–1)	Connecticut (13–7–3)	Dartmouth (14–6–1)	Boston College (14–8–1)	Dartmouth (17–6–1)	Boston College (17–10–1)	Wisconsin (19–11–2)	Boston College (19–12–1)	Augustana (22–10–4)	Massachusetts (22–12–1)	Connecticut (20–12–5)	Connecticut (20–13–5)	Connecticut (20–13–5)	13.
14.	Arizona State	Massachusetts (2–0–0)	Minnesota (1–2–1)	Providence (1–2–0)	Wisconsin (4–0–2)	Northeastern (5–1–0)	Massachusetts (7–4–0) т	Minnesota State (6–2–4)	Minnesota State (8–2–4)	Boston College (8–5–1)	Minnesota State (11–3–4)	Minnesota State (11–4–5)	Minnesota State (11–4–5)	Maine (11–7–2)	Providence (11–7–2)	Augustana (16–6–3) т	Boston College (14–8–1)	Dartmouth (16–6–1)	Boston College (15–9–1)	Wisconsin (18–10–2)	Connecticut (17–9–4)	Augustana (20–10–4)	Connecticut (18–11–5)	Connecticut (19–11–5)	Minnesota State (22–10–7)	Minnesota State (22–11–7)	Minnesota State (22–11–7)	14.
15.	Massachusetts	Arizona State (0–2–0)	Ohio State (2–0–0)	Ohio State (3–1–0)	Providence (2–2–1)	Providence (3–3–1)	Providence (4–3–2)	Boston College (6–4–1)	Boston College (7–5–1)	Connecticut (7–5–3)	Cornell (7–4–0)	Maine (11–7–1)	Providence (8–6–2)	Minnesota State (12–5–5) т	Augustana (14–6–3)	Boston College (11–8–1) т	St. Thomas (16–7–3)	St. Thomas (17–8–3)	St. Thomas (18–9–3)	St. Thomas (18–9–3)	Augustana (20–10–4)	Connecticut (17–10–5)	Massachusetts (21–12–1)	St. Thomas (21–11–5)	Massachusetts (22–13–1)	Massachusetts (22–13–1)	Merrimack (21-16-2)	15.
16.	Cornell	Cornell (0–0–0) т	Arizona State (2–2–0)	Wisconsin (2–0–2)	Colorado College (5–1–0)	Cornell (1–1–0)	Boston College (4–4–1)	Providence (5–4–2)	Cornell (6–2–0)	Cornell (6–3–0)	Harvard (7–3–1)	Cornell (7–4–0) т	Harvard (7–3–1)	Northeastern (10–7–0) т	Maine (12–9–2)	St. Thomas (14–7–3)	Augustana (16–7–3)	Augustana (18–7–3)	Minnesota State (15–8–5)	Michigan Tech (21–10–3)	St. Thomas (18–10–4)	Minnesota State (18–9–7)	Boston College (19–14–1)	Minnesota State (21–10–7)	Merrimack (21-15-2)	Merrimack (21-16-2)	Massachusetts (22–13–1)	16.
17.	Ohio State	Ohio State (0–0–0) т	Wisconsin (2–0–0)	Colorado College (5–1–0)	Ohio State (4–2–0)	Boston College (2–4–1)	Colorado College (6–3–1)	Cornell (4–2–0)	Providence (6–5–2)	Providence (7–6–2)	Providence (7–6–2)	Providence (8–6–2) т	Cornell (7–4–0)	Providence (9–7–2)	Minnesota State (12–6–5)	Maine (12–9–2)	Maine (14–9–2)	Minnesota State (15–8–5)	Michigan Tech (20–10–2)	Minnesota State (16–9–5)	Michigan Tech (21–10–3)	Massachusetts (19–12–1)	St. Thomas (20–11–5)	Boston College (20–14–1)	St. Thomas (21–12–5)	Augustana (22–11–4)	Augustana (22–11–4)	17.
18.	Minnesota State	Wisconsin (2–0–0)	Cornell (0–0–0)	Cornell (0–0–0)	Minnesota (2–5–1)	Minnesota State (4–2–2)	Minnesota State (4–2–2)	Massachusetts (7–6–0)	Harvard (5–1–1)	Boston University (7–7–1)	Maine (8–7–1)	Harvard (7–3–1)	Maine (11–7–1)	Augustana (12–6–3)	Princeton (11–5–0)	Boston University (12–10–1)	Minnesota State (13–8–5)	Maine (14–10–2)	Augustana (18–9–3)	Augustana (19–10–3)	Minnesota State (17–9–6)	Maine (18-12-3)	Minnesota State (20–10–7)	Augustana (22–11–4)	Augustana (22–11–4)	Boston College (20–15–1)	Boston College (20–15–1)	18.
19.	Wisconsin	St. Thomas (1–0–0)	Minnesota State (1–1–0)	Minnesota Duluth (5–1–0)	Minnesota State (3–1–2)	Colorado College (5–3–0)	Cornell (2–2–0)	Boston University (5–6–1)	Massachusetts (8–7–0)	Miami (10–4–0)	Colorado College (8–7–1)	Boston University (9–8–1)	Boston University (9–8–1)	Princeton (10–4–0)	St. Thomas (12–7–3)	Michigan Tech (16–8–2)	St. Cloud State (13–13–0)	Massachusetts (16–10–0)	Massachusetts (17–11–0)	Massachusetts (17–11–0)	Massachusetts (18–12–0)	St. Thomas (18–11–5)	Michigan Tech (23–12–3)	Ohio State (14–20–2)	Boston College (20–15–1)	St. Thomas (21–12–5)	St. Thomas (21–12–5)	19.
20.	Clarkson т St. Thomas т	Minnesota State (0–0–0)	Colorado College (3–1–0)	Minnesota State (1–1–2)	Cornell (0–0–0)	Miami (7–1–0)	Dartmouth (4–0–0)	Union (8–2–1)	Boston University (6–7–1)	Harvard (5–3–1)	Boston University (8–8–1)	Augustana (9–5–3) т New Hampshire (10–7–0) т	New Hampshire (10–7–0)	Harvard (7–5–1)	Boston University (10–9–1)	Minnesota State (12–8–5)	Michigan Tech (17–9–2)	Michigan Tech (18–10–2)	Miami (17–9–2)	Bowling Green (16–8–6)	Union (19-10-3)	Union (21-10-3)	Union (22-10-3)	Michigan Tech (23–13–3) т Princeton (17–12–3) т	Bentley (23-11-5)	Bentley (23-12-5)	Bentley (23-12-5)	20.
	Preseason Sep 29	Week 1 Oct 6	Week 2 Oct 13	Week 3 Oct 20	Week 4 Oct 27	Week 5 Nov 3	Week 6 Nov 10	Week 7 Nov 17	Week 8 Nov 24	Week 9 Dec 1	Week 10 Dec 8	Week 11 Dec 15	Week 13 Dec 29	Week 14 Jan 5	Week 15 Jan 12	Week 16 Jan 19	Week 17 Jan 26	Week 18 Feb 2	Week 19 Feb 9	Week 20 Feb 16	Week 21 Feb 23	Week 22 Mar 2	Week 23 Mar 9	Week 24 Mar 16	Week 25 Mar 23	Week 26 Mar 30	Final Apr 13	
		Dropped: Clarkson	Dropped: St. Thomas	Dropped: Arizona State	None	Dropped: Ohio State; Minnesota	Dropped: Miami	Dropped: Colorado College	Dropped: Union	Dropped: Massachusetts	Dropped: Miami	Dropped: Colorado College	Dropped: Augustana	Dropped: Boston University; New Hampshire	Dropped: Northeastern; Harvard	Dropped: Princeton	Dropped: Boston University	Dropped: St. Cloud State	Dropped: Maine	Dropped: Miami	Dropped: Bowling Green	Dropped: Michigan Tech	Dropped: Maine	Dropped: Union	Dropped: Ohio State; Michigan Tech; Princeton	None	None	
