= 2022–23 NCAA Division I independent men's ice hockey season =

2022–23 NCAA Division I Independent men's ice hockey season
- Season: 2022–23
- Conference: NCAA Division I Independent
- Division: Division I
- Sport: men's ice hockey
- Duration: October 1, 2022– March 11, 2023
- Number of teams: 6

Regular season

NCAA tournament
- Bids: 0

The 2022–23 NCAA Division I Independent men's ice hockey season was the 129th season of play for varsity ice hockey in the United States. The regular season began on October 1, 2022 and concluded on March 11, 2023. Two programs played their first Division I games this season while a third restarted its program.

== Season ==
After a successful, multi-million dollar fundraising effort, Alaska Anchorage reinstated its ice hockey program in time for the 2022–23 season.

After playing at the lower level of college hockey for over 40 years, Stonehill was promoted to Division I along with all of the varsity programs at that school. Due to the late announcement, however, the majority of teams that populated the Skyhawks' schedule were from the Division III and II levels.

The independent ranks also welcomed Lindenwood in its first varsity season. The Lions had fielded at least one team at the club level since 2003, and are 4-time national club champions.

== Coaches ==
As part of the Seawolves' renewal, Alaska Anchorage brought in Matt Shasby to be the program's new head coach.

=== Records ===
Team	Head coach	Season at school*	Record at school*
Alaska	Erik Largen	4	42–54–10
Alaska Anchorage	Matt Shasby	1	0–0–0
Arizona State	Greg Powers	8	90–119–18
Lindenwood	Rick Zombo	1	0–0–0
Long Island	Brett Riley	3	13–31–3
Stonehill	David Borges	9	87–102–22

* Only varsity seasons are included.

== Standings ==
2022–23 NCAA Division I Independent ice hockey standings
	Overall record					
	GP	W	L	T	GF	GA
#15 Alaska	34	22	10	2	104	74
Alaska Anchorage	28	8	19	1	66	106
Arizona State	39	18	21	0	115	112
Lindenwood	30	7	22	1	92	134
Long Island	36	13	22	1	116	123
Stonehill	25	17	6	2	102	95
Rankings: USCHO.com Top 20 Poll

== Ranking ==
=== USCHO ===
Team	Pre	1	2	3	4	5	6	7	8	9	10	11	12	13	14	15	16	17	18	19	20	21	22	23	24	25	26	Final
Alaska	NR	-	NR	NR	NR	NR	NR	NR	NR	NR	NR	NR	NR	-	NR	NR	NR	NR	NR	20	NR	NR	18	16	15	15	-	15
Alaska Anchorage	NR	-	NR	NR	NR	NR	NR	NR	NR	NR	NR	NR	NR	-	NR	NR	NR	NR	NR	NR	NR	NR	NR	NR	NR	NR	-	NR
Arizona State	NR	-	NR	NR	NR	NR	NR	NR	NR	NR	NR	NR	NR	-	NR	NR	NR	NR	NR	NR	NR	NR	NR	NR	NR	NR	-	NR
Lindenwood	NR	-	NR	NR	NR	NR	NR	NR	NR	NR	NR	NR	NR	-	NR	NR	NR	NR	NR	NR	NR	NR	NR	NR	NR	NR	-	NR
Long Island	NR	-	NR	NR	NR	NR	NR	NR	NR	NR	NR	NR	NR	-	NR	NR	NR	NR	NR	NR	NR	NR	NR	NR	NR	NR	-	NR
Stonehill	NR	-	NR	NR	NR	NR	NR	NR	NR	NR	NR	NR	NR	-	NR	NR	NR	NR	NR	NR	NR	NR	NR	NR	NR	NR	-	NR

=== USA Today ===
Team	Pre	1	2	3	4	5	6	7	8	9	10	11	12	13	14	15	16	17	18	19	20	21	22	23	24	25	26	Final
Alaska	NR	NR	NR	NR	NR	NR	NR	NR	NR	NR	NR	NR	NR	NR	NR	NR	NR	NR	NR	NR	NR	NR	19	15	15	15	15	15
Alaska Anchorage	NR	NR	NR	NR	NR	NR	NR	NR	NR	NR	NR	NR	NR	NR	NR	NR	NR	NR	NR	NR	NR	NR	NR	NR	NR	NR	NR	NR
Arizona State	NR	NR	NR	NR	NR	NR	NR	NR	NR	NR	NR	NR	NR	NR	NR	NR	NR	NR	NR	NR	NR	NR	NR	NR	NR	NR	NR	NR
Lindenwood	NR	NR	NR	NR	NR	NR	NR	NR	NR	NR	NR	NR	NR	NR	NR	NR	NR	NR	NR	NR	NR	NR	NR	NR	NR	NR	NR	NR
Long Island	NR	NR	NR	NR	NR	NR	NR	NR	NR	NR	NR	NR	NR	NR	NR	NR	NR	NR	NR	NR	NR	NR	NR	NR	NR	NR	NR	NR
Stonehill	NR	NR	NR	NR	NR	NR	NR	NR	NR	NR	NR	NR	NR	NR	NR	NR	NR	NR	NR	NR	NR	NR	NR	NR	NR	NR	NR	NR

=== Pairwise ===
Team	2	3	4	5	6	7	8	9	10	11	12	14	15	16	17	18	19	20	21	22	23	24	Final
Alaska	11	20	28	38	32	32	38	34	34	34	31	22	20	20	21	22	19	19	17	12	13	15	15
Alaska Anchorage	16	32	41	46	48	51	54	56	60	60	60	55	53	55	54	55	56	57	58	52	52	52	52
Arizona State	20	26	46	30	22	22	19	22	24	29	24	26	28	32	42	35	41	42	35	40	39	39	39
Lindenwood	22	49	43	52	50	39	45	50	52	52	52	54	56	57	59	58	60	59	61	60	60	60	60
Long Island	14	16	28	43	56	59	57	55	53	55	56	55	53	53	52	48	51	52	52	55	58	58	59
Stonehill	22	50	56	56	57	62	62	62	62	62	62	62	62	62	62	62	—	—	—	—	—	—	—

Note: teams ranked in the top-10 automatically qualify for the NCAA tournament. Teams ranked 11-16 can qualify based upon conference tournament results.
Note: On February 1, the NCAA selection committee removed all Stonehill games from tournament consideration.
