= 2022–23 Stonehill Skyhawks men's ice hockey season =

North Country Tournament, co-champion
- Conference: Independent
- Home ice: Bridgewater Ice Arena

Rankings
- USCHO: NR
- USA Today: NR

Record
- Overall: 17–6–2
- Home: 5–1–1
- Road: 11–5–0
- Neutral: 1–0–0

Coaches and captains
- Head coach: David Borges
- Assistant coaches: Darrell Borges
- Captain: Teddy McElaney
- Alternate captain(s): John Peloso; John Day

The 2022–23 Stonehill Skyhawks men's ice hockey season was the 44th season of play for the program and 1st at the Division I level. The Skyhawks represented Stonehill College and were coached by David Borges in his 9th season.

== Season ==
After the college announced that it was promoting all of its athletic programs to Division I for the 2022–23 academic season, the ice hockey program had just a scant few months to put a schedule together. While they were able to get a few D-I schools on their slate, the Skyhawks had to rely on Division II and III teams to fill out the majority of their schedule.

Due to weather conditions, the game against Franklin Pierce that was originally scheduled for January 24 was postponed.

On February 1, the NCAA selection committee voted to remove all Stonehill games from consideration for the NCAA tournament selection. This was done primarily due to the low number of Division I games that the Skyhawks played this season. Because this was Stonehill's first season at the D-I level, they were not eligible for postseason play so the ruling did not affect the program in any practical way.

Over the course of the season, two things became apparent for the Skyhawks. First, with the influx on scholarship players, the team was now significantly better than their former contemporaries. Going 17–1–2 against Division II and III opponents showed that Stonehill no longer belonged at the lower levels. However, despite setting a new program record for wins and winning percentage, Stonehill was not yet up to snuff at the Division I level. Losing their first game of the year to Long Island was probably unavoidable but the team showed little progress as the season went on. Due in part to exclusively playing D-II and -III opponents for almost 4 months, the Skyhawks did not have the ability to gage themselves against stronger competition and improve their play over the course of the year. The defense, which performed well in most games, was woefully inadequate when facing other D-I teams. The games against Lindenwood are of particular note as the Lions too were in their first season of Division I play. However, with Lindenwood playing a full D-I schedule, they were able to improve their play far more than the Skyhawks.

With more lead time for their second Division I season, Stonehill should not have to rely so heavily on the lower levels to fill up their schedule.

== Departures ==
Player	Position	Nationality	Cause
Sage Bittinger-Esser	Defenseman	United States	Left program (retired)
Kevin Buckley	Defenseman	United States	Left program (retired)
Timmy Grable	Defenseman	United States	Graduation (retired)
Josh Loveridge	Defenseman	United States	Left program (retired)
Chase McKay	Goaltender	United States	Graduation (retired)
Mitch Nenninger	Forward/Defenseman	United States	Left program (retired)
Charlie Page	Forward	United States	Graduation (retired)
Luke Richards	Defenseman	United States	Returned to juniors (Team Maryland)
Matty Ryan	Forward	United States	Left program (retired)
Mike Seoane	Forward	United States	Graduation (retired)
Augie Stevens	Defenseman	Canada	Graduation (retired)
Adam Usinger	Forward	United States	Left program (retired)

== Recruiting ==
Player	Position	Nationality	Age	Notes
Cameron Collins	Forward	United States	20	Raynham, MA
Ryan Davies	Defenseman	United States	21	Arlington, MA
Dylan Ghaemi	Goaltender	United States	20	Fairport, NY
Frank Ireland	Forward	United States	21	Longmeadow, MA
Michael Martignetti	Defenseman	United States	20	Winchester, MA
Austin Pick	Forward	United States	20	Troutdale, OR
Matthew Pimental	Forward	United States	21	East Providence, RI
Carter Rapalje	Forward	United States	21	Burlington, VT
Dean Schwenninger	Forward	Switzerland	21	Zurich, SUI
Jack Shemligian	Defenseman	United States	19	Southborough, MA
William Tripp	Defenseman	United States	20	Lakeville, MA

== Roster ==
As of September 12, 2022

No.	Nat.	Player	Class	Pos	Height	Weight	DoB	Hometown	Previous team	NHL rights
1	(United States)	Dylan Ghaemi	Freshman	G	6' 4" (1.93 m)	200 lb (91 kg)	2001-12-30	Fairport, New York	Järvso (Hockeytrean)	—
2	(United States)	Richard Hall	Senior	D	6' 1" (1.85 m)	205 lb (93 kg)	2000-01-26	Shelburne, Vermont	Stanstead College (MPHL)	—
3	(United States)	Matt Talarico	Junior	F	5' 8" (1.73 m)	175 lb (79 kg)	2001-03-17	Raynham, Massachusetts	Walpole Express (EHL)	—
4	(United States)	Drew Gardner	Junior	D	6' 2" (1.88 m)	190 lb (86 kg)	2000-01-13	Glenburn, Maine	Twin City Thunder (NCDC)	—
5	(United States)	Ryan Davies	Freshman	D	5' 10" (1.78 m)	179 lb (81 kg)	2001-03-27	Arlington, Massachusetts	Valley Jr. Warriors (EHL)	—
6	(United States)	Frank Ireland	Freshman	F	5' 11" (1.8 m)	185 lb (84 kg)	2001-02-06	South Easton, Massachusetts	Boston Junior Bruins (NCDC)	—
8	(United States)	Cam Mannion	Sophomore	F	6' 1" (1.85 m)	202 lb (92 kg)	2001-10-31	Dorchester, Massachusetts	South Shore Kings (NCDC)	—
9	(United States)	Teddy McElaney (C)	Senior	D	6' 0" (1.83 m)	180 lb (82 kg)	1999-09-16	Walpole, Massachusetts	St. Paul's School (USHS–NH)	—
10	(United States)	Brendan Nehmer	Senior	F	5' 10" (1.78 m)	160 lb (73 kg)	2000-04-02	East Longmeadow, Massachusetts	Williston Northampton School (USHS–MA)	—
12	(United States)	Carter Rapalje	Freshman	F	5' 10" (1.78 m)	170 lb (77 kg)	2001-08-10	Colorado Springs, Colorado	North Iowa Bulls (NAHL)	—
13	(United States)	Michael Martignetti	Freshman	D	5' 11" (1.8 m)	185 lb (84 kg)	2002-03-13	Winchester, Massachusetts	Worcester Jr. Railers (EHL)	—
14	(United States)	Max Pineo	Junior	F	5' 10" (1.78 m)	175 lb (79 kg)	2000-08-07	North Reading, Massachusetts	Tilton School (USHS–NH)	—
16	(United States)	Jack Shemligian	Freshman	D	6' 0" (1.83 m)	190 lb (86 kg)	2003-04-22	Southborough, Massachusetts	East Coast Wizards (EHL)	—
18	(United States)	Nolan FitzPatrick	Sophomore	F	6' 0" (1.83 m)	185 lb (84 kg)	2000-06-25	Bridgewater, Massachusetts	Thayer Academy (USHS–MA)	—
19	(United States)	John Peloso (A)	Senior	F	5' 11" (1.8 m)	200 lb (91 kg)	1999-10-01	Townshend, Vermont	Vermont Academy (USHS–VT)	—
20	(United States)	Matthew Pimental	Freshman	F	5' 10" (1.78 m)	180 lb (82 kg)	2001-03-13	East Providence, Rhode Island	Worcester Jr. Railers (EHL)	—
21	(United States)	Thomas Horak	Junior	F	5' 11" (1.8 m)	170 lb (77 kg)	1999-12-07	St. Louis, Missouri	New Hampshire Junior Monarchs (USPHL)	—
22	(United States)	Jake Cady	Sophomore	F	5' 9" (1.75 m)	190 lb (86 kg)	2001-07-04	Raynham, Massachusetts	South Shore Kings (NCDC)	—
23	(United States)	Patrick Sunderland	Junior	F	5' 9" (1.75 m)	155 lb (70 kg)	1999-06-29	Mansfield, Massachusetts	South Shore Kings (USPHL)	—
24	(United States)	Andrew Gotts	Junior	F	6' 0" (1.83 m)	160 lb (73 kg)	2000-09-23	Topsfield, Massachusetts	Holderness School (USHS–NH)	—
25	(Switzerland)	Dean Schwenninger	Freshman	F	5' 9" (1.75 m)	170 lb (77 kg)	2001-03-05	Zürich, Switzerland	Minot Minotauros (NAHL)	—
27	(United States)	Cameron Collins	Freshman	F	5' 10" (1.78 m)	175 lb (79 kg)	2002-09-04	Raynham, Massachusetts	East Coast Wizards (EHL)	—
28	(United States)	Austin Pick	Freshman	F	5' 8" (1.73 m)	185 lb (84 kg)	2001-09-29	Troutdale, Oregon	Seahawks Hockey Club (EHL)	—
29	(United States)	John Day (A)	Senior	G	5' 10" (1.78 m)	175 lb (79 kg)	1999-11-22	North Reading, Massachusetts	Buckingham Browne & Nichols School (USHS–MA)	—
30	(United States)	Gavin FitzPatrick	Sophomore	G	6' 0" (1.83 m)	185 lb (84 kg)	2002-01-09	Bridgewater, Massachusetts	South Shore Kings (NCDC)	—
37	(United States)	Kyle Heath	Sophomore	F	5' 8" (1.73 m)	160 lb (73 kg)	2002-04-28	West Bridgewater, Massachusetts	Middlesex School (USHS–MA)	—
44	(United States)	William Tripp	Freshman	D	5' 11" (1.8 m)	160 lb (73 kg)	2002-05-17	Lakeville, Massachusetts	South Shore Kings (NCDC)	—
55	(United States)	Will Cohen	Junior	F	6' 0" (1.83 m)	165 lb (75 kg)	2002-05-23	Billerica, Massachusetts	Valley Jr. Warriors (EHL)	—
77	(United States)	Ryan King	Junior	F	6' 1" (1.85 m)	180 lb (82 kg)	1999-03-20	East Greenwich, Rhode Island	Seahawks Hockey Club (EHL)	—

== Standings ==
2022–23 NCAA Division I Independent ice hockey standings
	Overall record					
	GP	W	L	T	GF	GA
#15 Alaska	34	22	10	2	104	74
Alaska Anchorage	28	8	19	1	66	106
Arizona State	39	18	21	0	115	112
Lindenwood	30	7	22	1	92	134
Long Island	36	13	22	1	116	123
Stonehill	25	17	6	2	102	95
Rankings: USCHO.com Top 20 Poll

== Schedule and results ==
Date	Time	Opponent^{#}	Rank^{#}	Site	TV	Decision	Result	Attendance	Record
Regular season
October 8	5:00 p.m.	Long Island*		Bridgewater Ice Arena • Bridgewater, Massachusetts		Day	L 1–7	175	0–1–0
October 15	5:00 p.m.	Salve Regina*		Bridgewater Ice Arena • Bridgewater, Massachusetts		FitzPatrick	W 6–5 ^{OT}	200	1–1–0
October 19	6:00 p.m.	at Fitchburg State*		Wallace Civic Center • Fitchburg, Massachusetts		FitzPatrick	W 3–2	100	2–1–0
October 22	1:00 p.m.	New England College*		Bridgewater Ice Arena • Bridgewater, Massachusetts		FitzPatrick	W 2–1 ^{OT}	200	3–1–0
October 25	7:00 p.m.	at New England College*		Lee Clement Arena • Henniker, New Hampshire		Ghaemi	W 7–0	193	4–1–0
October 29	5:00 p.m.	at Massachusetts Dartmouth*		Hetland Arena • North Dartmouth, Massachusetts		FitzPatrick	W 3–1	87	5–1–0
November 11	5:40 p.m.	at Anna Maria*		Daniel J. Horgan Memorial Arena • Auburn, Massachusetts		FitzPatrick	W 5–2	229	6–1–0
November 19	2:45 p.m.	at Post*		Sports Center of Connecticut • Waterbury, Connecticut		Day	W 5–2	108	7–1–0
November 22	7:30 p.m.	Westfield State*		Bridgewater Ice Arena • Bridgewater, Massachusetts		FitzPatrick	T 5–5 ^{OT}	400	7–1–1
North Country Tournament
November 26	7:00 p.m.	at Potsdam State*		Maxcy Hall • Potsdam, New York (North Country Tournament)		Day	W 4–3	140	8–1–1
November 27	1:00 p.m.	vs. Canton State*		Maxcy Hall • Potsdam, New York (North Country Tournament)		FitzPatrick	W 7–5	113	9–1–1
December 6	7:00 p.m.	Worcester State*		Bridgewater Ice Arena • Bridgewater, Massachusetts		Day	W 5–3	169	10–1–1
December 9	7:00 p.m.	at Southern Maine*		USM Ice Arena • Gorham, Maine		Day	T 2–2 ^{OT}	158	10–1–2
January 6	5:00 p.m.	at Cortland State*		Alumni Arena • Cortland, New York		FitzPatrick	L 4–10	111	10–2–2
January 7	4:00 p.m.	at Morrisville State*		Morrisville State IcePlex • Morrisville, New York		Day	W 4–3	158	11–2–2
January 10	5:50 p.m.	at Assumption*		Worcester Ice Center • Worcester, Massachusetts		Day	W 8–2	359	12–2–2
January 14	4:00 p.m.	at Saint Anselm*		Thomas F. Sullivan Arena • Manchester, New Hampshire		FitzPatrick	W 3–1	257	13–2–2
January 17	7:30 p.m.	Rivier*		Bridgewater Ice Arena • Bridgewater, Massachusetts		Day	W 5–1	200	14–2–2
February 3	5:00 p.m.	at Long Island*		Northwell Health Ice Center • East Meadow, New York	ESPN+	FitzPatrick	L 3–9	210	14–3–2
February 4	4:00 p.m.	at Long Island*		Northwell Health Ice Center • East Meadow, New York	ESPN+	Day	L 1–9	337	14–4–2
February 7	7:30 p.m.	at Franklin Pierce*		Jason Ritchie Ice Arena • Rindge, New Hampshire		FitzPatrick	W 5–3	46	15–4–2
February 10	8:10 p.m.	at Lindenwood*		Centene Community Ice Center • St. Charles, Missouri		FitzPatrick	L 2–5	2,008	15–5–2
February 11	3:10 p.m.	at Lindenwood*		Centene Community Ice Center • St. Charles, Missouri		Day	L 3–10	1,163	15–6–2
February 14	6:00 p.m.	at Saint Anselm*		Thomas F. Sullivan Arena • Manchester, New Hampshire		FitzPatrick	W 3–2	256	16–6–2
February 18	1:00 p.m.	Framingham State*		Bridgewater Ice Arena • Bridgewater, Massachusetts		Day	W 6–2	400	17–6–2
*Non-conference game. ^{#}Rankings from USCHO.com Poll. All times are in Eastern Time. Source:

== Scoring statistics ==
Name	Position	Games	Goals	Assists	Points	PIM
Frank Ireland	F	25	17	27	44	38
Carter Rapalje	F	23	20	15	35	0
Dean Schwenninger	F	23	10	22	32	52
William Tripp	D	25	1	23	24	14
Kyle Heath	F	23	10	7	17	35
Brendan Nehmer	F	25	4	14	17	8
Cameron Collins	F	23	3	10	13	8
Nolan FitzPatrick	F	25	7	5	12	14
Max Pineo	F	24	6	6	12	6
Jake Cady	F	25	7	2	9	30
Teddy McElaney	D	23	1	7	8	18
John Peloso	F	14	4	3	7	5
Will Cohen	D	19	2	5	7	4
Ryan Davies	D	24	1	6	7	14
Matt Talarico	F	20	3	3	6	6
Austin Pick	F	15	1	2	3	2
Matthew Pimental	F	16	1	2	3	8
Thomas Horak	F	20	1	2	3	23
Michael Martignetti	D	23	1	2	3	12
Ryan King	F	10	1	1	2	8
Cam Mannion	D	17	1	1	2	6
Richard Hall	D	13	0	1	1	13
John Day	G	14	0	1	1	0
Drew Gardner	D	14	0	1	1	17
Dylan Ghaemi	G	3	0	0	0	0
Gavin FitzPatrick	G	14	0	0	0	0
Jack Shemligian	D	11	0	0	0	6
Total			102	167	269	355

== Goaltending statistics ==
Name	Games	Minutes	Wins	Losses	Ties	Goals against	Saves	Shut-outs	SV %	GAA
John Day	13	713:33	7	3	1	44	345	0	.887	3.70
Gavin FitzPatrick	13	787:29	9	3	1	49	413	0	.894	3.73
Dylan Ghaemi	3	19:02	1	0	0	2	4	0	.667	6.30
Empty Net	-	0:05	-	-	-	0	-	-	-	-
Total	25	1520:09	17	6	2	95	762	1	.889	3.75

Note: Day and Ghaemi shared the shutout on October 25.

== Rankings ==
Poll	Week																											
Poll	Pre	1	2	3	4	5	6	7	8	9	10	11	12	13	14	15	16	17	18	19	20	21	22	23	24	25	26	27 (Final)
USCHO.com	NR	-	NR	NR	NR	NR	NR	NR	NR	NR	NR	NR	NR	-	NR	NR	NR	NR	NR	NR	NR	NR	NR	NR	NR	NR	-	NR
USA Today	NR	NR	NR	NR	NR	NR	NR	NR	NR	NR	NR	NR	NR	NR	NR	NR	NR	NR	NR	NR	NR	NR	NR	NR	NR	NR	NR	NR

Note: USCHO did not release a poll in weeks 1, 13, or 26.
