= 2022–23 Arizona State Sun Devils men's ice hockey season =

- Conference: Independent
- Home ice: Mullett Arena

Rankings
- USCHO: NR
- USA Today: NR

Record
- Overall: 18–21–0
- Home: 14–10–0
- Road: 4–11–0
- Neutral: 1–0–0

Coaches and captains
- Head coach: Greg Powers
- Assistant coaches: Mike Field; Alex Hicks; Eddie Läck

The 2022–23 Arizona State Sun Devils men's ice hockey season was the 8th season of play for the program at the Division I level. The Sun Devils represented Arizona State University and were coached by Greg Powers, in his 11th season.

== Departures ==
Player	Position	Nationality	Cause
Jack Becker	Forward	United States	Graduation (signed with Idaho Steelheads)
Cole Brady	Goaltender	Canada	Transferred to Massachusetts
Sean Dhooghe	Forward	United States	Graduation (retired)
Willie Knierim	Forward	United States	Graduation (signed with Idaho Steelheads)
Carson Kosobud	Defenseman	United States	Transferred to Alaska Anchorage
Michael Mancinelli	Forward	United States	Transferred to Maine
Bronson Moore	Goaltender	United States	Graduation (retired)
Jordan Sandhu	Forward	Canada	Graduation (retired)
Tim Theocharidis	Defenseman	Canada	Graduation (signed with Adirondack Thunder)
Colin Theisen	Forward	United States	Graduation (signed with Tucson Roadrunners)
Johnny Walker	Forward	United States	Graduation (signed with Utah Grizzlies)
Jacob Wilson	Defenseman	United States	Graduation (signed with Providence Bruins)

== Recruiting ==
Player	Position	Nationality	Age	Notes
Ryan Alexander	Forward	Canada	20	Toronto, ON
Max Bronstine	Defenseman	Canada	20	Toronto, ON
Dominick Campione	Defenseman	United States	19	Kohler, WI
Blake Dangos	Defenseman	United States	20	St. Louis, MO
Gibson Homer	Goaltender	United States	18	Grand Rapids, MI
Dylan Jackson	Forward	Canada	21	Oakville, ON; transfer from Northeastern
Ty Jackson	Forward	Canada	21	Oakville, ON; transfer from Northeastern
Teddy Lagerback	Forward	United States	21	Chanhassen, MN
Robert Mastrosimone	Forward	United States	21	Bay Shore, NY; transfer from Boston University; selected 54th overall in 2019
Tucker Ness	Defenseman	United States	19	Plymouth, MN
Ryan Robinson	Forward	United States	20	Plano, TX
Charlie Schoen	Forward	United States	21	Andover, MN
T. J. Semptimphelter	Goaltender	United States	20	Marlton, NJ; transfer from Northeastern
Lukas Sillinger	Forward	Canada	22	Regina, SK; transfer from Bemidji State
Cade Stibbe	Forward	United States	21	Fargo, ND
Brendan Studioso	Forward	United States	23	Mukilteo, WA; joined from club team mid-season.

== Roster ==
As of July 18, 2022.

No.	Nat.	Player	Class	Pos	Height	Weight	DoB	Hometown	Previous team	NHL rights
4	(United States)	Blake Dangos	Freshman	D	5' 10" (1.78 m)	174 lb (79 kg)	2002-04-08	St. Louis, Missouri	Madison (USHL)	—
5	(United States)	Ty Murchison	Sophomore	D	6' 2" (1.88 m)	190 lb (86 kg)	2003-02-02	Corona, California	NTDP (USHL)	PHI, 158th overall 2021
8	(Canada)	Tanner Hickey	Senior	D	5' 10" (1.78 m)	170 lb (77 kg)	1999-04-30	Leduc, Alberta	Alabama Huntsville (WCHA)	—
10	(United States)	Tucker Ness	Freshman	D	6' 2" (1.88 m)	216 lb (98 kg)	2002-11-25	Plymouth, Minnesota	Waterloo (USHL)	—
11	(United States)	Benji Eckerle	Junior	F	5' 9" (1.75 m)	180 lb (82 kg)	1999-09-24	Northville, Michigan	Tri-City (USHL)	—
13	(United States)	Chris Grando	Graduate	F	5' 10" (1.78 m)	171 lb (78 kg)	1998-08-22	Islip, New York	Boston College (HEA)	—
14	(Canada)	Ty Jackson	Junior	F	5' 8" (1.73 m)	169 lb (77 kg)	2001-09-06	Oakville, Ontario	Northeastern (HEA)	—
15	(Canada)	Dylan Jackson	Junior	F	5' 10" (1.78 m)	170 lb (77 kg)	2001-09-06	Oakville, Ontario	Northeastern (HEA)	—
16	(United States)	Ethan Szmagaj	Sophomore	D	6' 0" (1.83 m)	194 lb (88 kg)	2001-09-18	Canton, Michigan	Waterloo (USHL)	—
17	(United States)	Jacob Semik	Senior	D	6' 0" (1.83 m)	180 lb (82 kg)	2000-03-10	Canton, Michigan	Dubuque (USHL)	—
18	(United States)	Jack Jensen	Sophomore	F	6' 2" (1.88 m)	190 lb (86 kg)	2000-08-31	Eden Prairie, Minnesota	Omaha (USHL)	—
20	(United States)	Jackson Niedermayer	Sophomore	F	6' 0" (1.83 m)	200 lb (91 kg)	2001-03-11	Newport Beach, California	Penticton (BCHL)	—
21	(United States)	Brendan Studioso	Junior	F	6' 1" (1.85 m)	185 lb (84 kg)	1999-06-01	Mukilteo, Washington	North Iowa (NA3HL)	—
22	(Canada)	Jack Judson	Junior	D	6' 1" (1.85 m)	190 lb (86 kg)	2000-02-26	White Rock, British Columbia	Vernon (BCHL)	—
23	(United States)	Demetrios Koumontzis	Graduate	F	5' 10" (1.78 m)	183 lb (83 kg)	2000-03-24	Scottsdale, Arizona	Edina (USHS–MN)	CGY, 108th overall 2018
27	(United States)	Tim Lovell	Junior	D	5' 9" (1.75 m)	156 lb (71 kg)	2002-02-08	Hingham, Massachusetts	Boston College (HEA)	—
28	(United States)	Matthew Kopperud	Junior	F	6' 0" (1.83 m)	190 lb (86 kg)	1999-08-04	Denver, Colorado	Dubuque (USHL)	—
29	(United States)	Cade Stibbe	Freshman	F	5' 7" (1.7 m)	161 lb (73 kg)	2001-05-15	Fargo, North Dakota	Wenatchee (BCHL)	—
31	(United States)	Gibson Homer	Freshman	G	6' 5" (1.96 m)	209 lb (95 kg)	2003-12-29	Grand Rapids, Michigan	Chicago (USHL)	—
33	(United States)	Ben Kraws	Senior	G	6' 5" (1.96 m)	195 lb (88 kg)	2000-08-02	Cranbury, New Jersey	Miami (NCHC)	—
35	(United States)	T. J. Semptimphelter	Sophomore	G	6' 1" (1.85 m)	190 lb (86 kg)	2002-05-09	Marlton, New Jersey	Northeastern (HEA)	—
39	(United States)	Ryan O'Reilly	Junior	F	6' 3" (1.91 m)	205 lb (93 kg)	2000-03-21	Southlake, Texas	Green Bay (USHL)	DET, 98th overall 2018
53	(Canada)	Ryan Alexander	Freshman	F	5' 10" (1.78 m)	169 lb (77 kg)	2002-06-17	Toronto, Ontario	Fargo (USHL)	—
61	(Canada)	Lukas Sillinger	Junior	F	5' 11" (1.8 m)	162 lb (73 kg)	2000-09-14	Regina, Saskatchewan	Bemidji State (CCHA)	—
71	(United States)	Ryan Robinson	Freshman	F	6' 0" (1.83 m)	190 lb (86 kg)	2001-10-09	Plano, Texas	Wichita Falls (NAHL)	—
81	(United States)	Teddy Lagerback	Freshman	F	6' 0" (1.83 m)	187 lb (85 kg)	2001-08-21	Chanhassen, Minnesota	Trail (BCHL)	—
82	(United States)	Charlie Schoen	Freshman	F	5' 9" (1.75 m)	155 lb (70 kg)	2001-06-02	Andover, Minnesota	Sioux City (USHL)	—
91	(United States)	Josh Doan	Sophomore	F	6' 2" (1.88 m)	176 lb (80 kg)	2002-02-01	Scottsdale, Arizona	Chicago (USHL)	ARI, 37th overall 2021
94	(United States)	Robert Mastrosimone	Senior	F	5' 10" (1.78 m)	170 lb (77 kg)	2001-01-24	East Islip, New York	Boston University (HEA)	DET, 54th overall 2019

== Standings ==
2022–23 NCAA Division I Independent ice hockey standings
	Overall record					
	GP	W	L	T	GF	GA
#15 Alaska	34	22	10	2	104	74
Alaska Anchorage	28	8	19	1	66	106
Arizona State	39	18	21	0	115	112
Lindenwood	30	7	22	1	92	134
Long Island	36	13	22	1	116	123
Stonehill	25	17	6	2	102	95
Rankings: USCHO.com Top 20 Poll

== Schedule and results ==
Date	Time	Opponent^{#}	Rank^{#}	Site	TV	Decision	Result	Attendance	Record
Regular Season
October 1	5:00 PM	at #5 Minnesota Duluth*		AMSOIL Arena • Duluth, Minnesota	MY9	Semptimphelter	L 2–3 ^{OT}	5,910	0–1–0
October 2	3:00 PM	at #5 Minnesota Duluth*		AMSOIL Arena • Duluth, Minnesota	MY9	Semptimphelter	L 1–4	5,153	0–2–0
October 7	6:07 PM	at Bemidji State*		Sanford Center • Bemidji, Minnesota	FloHockey	Semptimphelter	W 3–0	1,955	1–2–0
October 8	5:07 PM	at Bemidji State*		Sanford Center • Bemidji, Minnesota	FloHockey	Semptimphelter	L 4–5 ^{OT}	2,031	1–3–0
October 14	7:05 PM	Colgate*		Mullett Arena • Tempe, Arizona	Pac-12 Insider	Semptimphelter	W 2–0	5,026	2–3–0
October 15	7:05 PM	Colgate*		Mullett Arena • Tempe, Arizona	Pac-12 Insider	Semptimphelter	L 0–4	5,000	2–4–0
October 21	7:00 PM	Colorado College*		Mullett Arena • Tempe, Arizona	Pac-12 Insider	Semptimphelter	W 5–3	4,692	3–4–0
October 22	7:00 PM	Colorado College*		Mullett Arena • Tempe, Arizona	Pac-12 Insider	Semptimphelter	W 6–1	4,967	4–4–0
October 29	7:07 PM	vs. #6 North Dakota*		T-Mobile Arena • Las Vegas, Nevada (US Hockey Hall of Fame Game)	Midco	Semptimphelter	W 3–2	15,503	5–4–0
November 11	7:00 PM	Alaska Anchorage*		Mullett Arena • Tempe, Arizona		Semptimphelter	W 5–2	4,762	6–4–0
November 12	5:00 PM	Alaska Anchorage*		Mullett Arena • Tempe, Arizona		Semptimphelter	W 3–0	4,787	7–4–0
November 18	5:00 PM	at Clarkson*		Cheel Arena • Potsdam, New York	ESPN+	Semptimphelter	L 1–2	2,225	7–5–0
November 19	5:00 PM	at Clarkson*		Cheel Arena • Potsdam, New York	ESPN+	Semptimphelter	L 3–5	2,432	7–6–0
November 25	7:00 PM	#2 Minnesota*		Mullett Arena • Tempe, Arizona	Pac-12 Insider	Semptimphelter	L 2–3	5,109	7–7–0
November 26	7:00 PM	#2 Minnesota*		Mullett Arena • Tempe, Arizona	Pac-12 Insider	Semptimphelter	W 6–5 ^{OT}	5,153	8–7–0
December 2	7:00 PM	at #1 Denver*		Magness Arena • Denver, Colorado	Altitude 2	Semptimphelter	L 2–3	5,260	8–8–0
December 3	6:00 PM	at #1 Denver*		Magness Arena • Denver, Colorado		Semptimphelter	L 2–5	5,510	8–9–0
December 9	5:00 PM	at New Hampshire*		Whittemore Center • Durham, New Hampshire	ESPN+	Semptimphelter	W 4–1	3,859	9–9–0
December 10	2:00 PM	at New Hampshire*		Whittemore Center • Durham, New Hampshire	ESPN+	Semptimphelter	L 4–5 ^{OT}	3,363	9–10–0
December 30	7:00 PM	Boston College*		Mullett Arena • Tempe, Arizona		Semptimphelter	L 2–5	5,000	9–11–0
December 31	7:00 PM	Boston College*		Mullett Arena • Tempe, Arizona		Semptimphelter	W 2–1	4,820	10–11–0
Desert Hockey Classic
January 6	7:00 PM	#16 Michigan Tech*		Mullett Arena • Tempe, Arizona (Desert Hockey Classic Semifinal)		Semptimphelter	L 2–4	4,956	10–12–0
January 7	7:00 PM	Air Force*		Mullett Arena • Tempe, Arizona (Desert Hockey Classic Consolation)		Semptimphelter	W 2–0		11–12–0
January 13	7:00 PM	#17 Minnesota State*		Mullett Arena • Tempe, Arizona		Semptimphelter	L 1–3	4,973	11–13–0
January 14	7:00 PM	#17 Minnesota State*		Mullett Arena • Tempe, Arizona	Pac-12 Insider	Semptimphelter	L 0–5	5,179	11–14–0
January 20	7:05 PM	#20 RIT*		Mullett Arena • Tempe, Arizona		Semptimphelter	L 1–5	4,610	11–15–0
January 21	7:05 PM	#20 RIT*		Mullett Arena • Tempe, Arizona		Semptimphelter	L 3–5	4,520	11–16–0
January 27	7:00 PM	St. Thomas*		Mullett Arena • Tempe, Arizona		Semptimphelter	W 4–0	4,336	12–16–0
January 28	7:00 PM	St. Thomas*		Mullett Arena • Tempe, Arizona		Semptimphelter	W 4–3 ^{OT}	4,464	13–16–0
February 3	9:07 PM	at Alaska*		Carlson Center • Fairbanks, Alaska	FloHockey	Semptimphelter	L 1–2	2,016	13–17–0
February 4	9:07 PM	at Alaska*		Carlson Center • Fairbanks, Alaska	FloHockey	Semptimphelter	L 2–5	2,892	13–18–0
February 17	7:00 PM	Lindenwood*		Mullett Arena • Tempe, Arizona		Semptimphelter	W 8–2	4,670	14–18–0
February 18	7:00 PM	Lindenwood*		Mullett Arena • Tempe, Arizona		Semptimphelter	W 5–3	5,045	(15–18–0)
February 24	7:00 PM	Alaska*		Mullett Arena • Tempe, Arizona	Pac-12 Insider	Semptimphelter	L 2–4	4,716	15–19–0
February 25	7:00 PM	Alaska*		Mullett Arena • Tempe, Arizona		Semptimphelter	L 2–4	5,010	15–20–0
March 3	9:07 PM	at Alaska Anchorage*		Seawolf Sports Complex • Anchorage, Alaska		Kraws	W 5–0	555	16–20–0
March 4	7:07 PM	at Alaska Anchorage*		Seawolf Sports Complex • Anchorage, Alaska		Semptimphelter	L 3–4	666	16–21–0
March 10	7:00 PM	Long Island*		Mullett Arena • Tempe, Arizona		Kraws	W 6–3	4,448	17–21–0
March 11	7:00 PM	Long Island*		Mullett Arena • Tempe, Arizona		Kraws	W 2–1 ^{OT}	4,516	18–21–0
*Non-conference game. ^{#}Rankings from USCHO.com Poll. All times are in Mountain Time. Source:

== Rankings ==
Poll	Week																											
Poll	Pre	1	2	3	4	5	6	7	8	9	10	11	12	13	14	15	16	17	18	19	20	21	22	23	24	25	26	27 (Final)
USCHO.com	NR	–	NR	NR	NR	NR	NR	NR	NR	NR	NR	NR	NR	NR	–	NR	NR	NR	NR	NR	NR	NR	NR	NR	NR	NR	–	NR
USA Today	NR	NR	NR	NR	NR	NR	20	20т	RV	NR	NR	NR	NR	NR	NR	NR	NR	NR	NR	NR	NR	NR	NR	NR	NR	NR	NR	NR

Note: USCHO did not release a poll in weeks 1, 13, or 26.
