= 2022–23 Alaska Anchorage Seawolves men's ice hockey season =

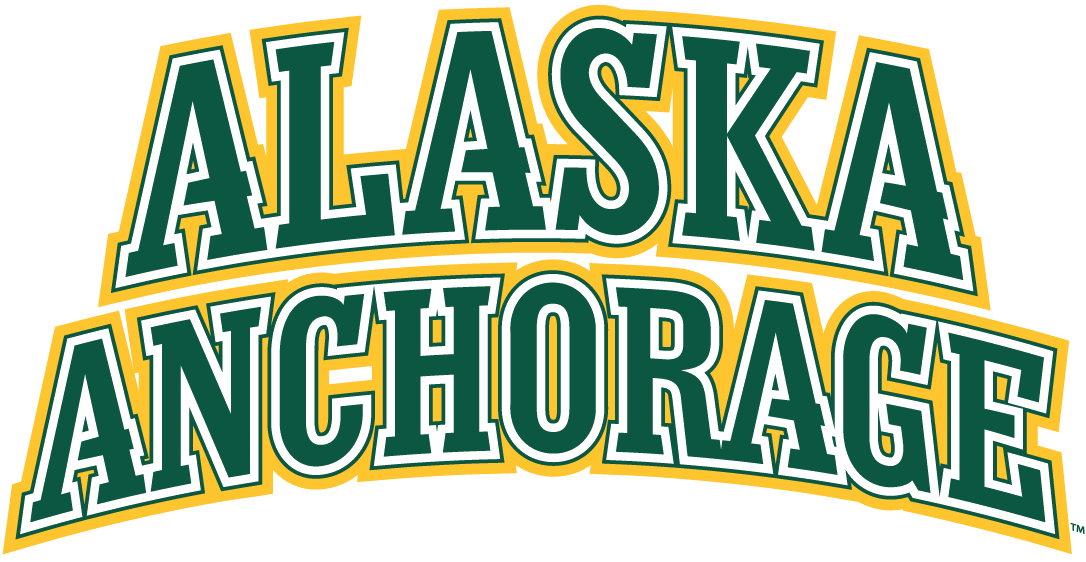
- Conference: Independent
- Home ice: Seawolf Sports Complex

Rankings
- USCHO: NR
- USA Today: NR

Record
- Overall: 8–19–1
- Home: 3–5–1
- Road: 5–14–0

Coaches and captains
- Head coach: Matt Shasby
- Assistant coaches: Trevor Stewart; Kevin Murdock

The 2022–23 Alaska Anchorage Seawolves men's ice hockey season was the 42nd season of play for the program and the 37th at the Division I level. The Seawolves represented the University of Alaska Anchorage and were coached by Matt Shasby in his 1st season.

== Season ==
After the program was suspended due to a funding crisis at the school, a campaign was launched to save the program. At the outset, the university said that approximately $3 million were required which would cover the operating cost of the ice hockey team for two years. While the team would be unable to compete during the 2021–22 season, the rapid fundraising that followed allowed the Seawolves to return after only a year hiatus.

The Seawolves played their first game in over two and a half year on the opening day of the regular season and gave their fans a present; Anchorage took down a ranked Western Michigan squad. It was the program's first win over a nationally ranked opponent since December 2016 and demonstrated that, despite their circumstances, this group of Seawolves were fighters. Due to the late nature of their schedule making, Anchorage wasn't able to get a full slate of games against Division I opponents, but they weren't forced to add too many additional games. The Seawolves inserted six exhibition matches into their schedule and, while they were able to win all of those games, they didn't receive any official credit for doing so. What those matches did do was allow the newly assembled team extra time to get used to one another and build some chemistry in the lineup.

The familiarity was needed since the Seawolves were only able to win once more in the first half of the season after taking down the Broncos. They entered the winter break on an 8-game losing streak which included 4 consecutive losses to rival Alaska. The team began the second half of the year by taking a trip southeast and met UMass Lowell, who were preparing for a potential run to the NCAA tournament. Instead, Anchorage swept the #13 River Hawks, giving the program its first such weekend since 2009. Trying to build on the sudden success, the Seawolves lost each of the next 5 games by just a single goal, with 4 coming in extra time. However, by the end of February the team seemed to have gotten things figured out and went 4–2–1 at the end of the season.

== Departures ==
Player	Position	Nationality	Cause
Brayden Camrud	Forward	Canada	Transferred to Saskatchewan
Kristofer Carlson	Goaltender	United States	Transferred to Long Island
Zach Court	Forward	Canada	Signed professional contract (Rapid City Rush)
Olivier Gauthier	Defenseman	Canada	Transferred to Niagara
Andrew Lane	Forward	United States	Transferred to Aurora
Zac Masson	Forward	Canada	Graduation (signed with Bisons de Neuilly-sur-Marne)
Aaron McPheters	Defenseman	Finland	Graduation (retired)
Jared Nash	Forward	Canada	Transferred to Oswego State
Drayson Pears	Defenseman	Canada	Signed professional contract (Dogs de Cholet)
Troy Robillard	Defenseman	Canada	Transferred to Oswego State
Daniel Rybarik	Forward	Canada	Transferred to Dalhousie
Kristian Stead	Goaltender	Canada	Graduation (signed with Knoxville Ice Bears)
Preston Weeks	Defenseman	United States	Left program (retired)

Note: Departures occurred prior the 2021–22 season.

== Recruiting ==
As a result of the team being restarted, the entire roster consists of players new to the program. Caleb Huffman joined mid-season.

== Roster ==
As of June 30, 2022.

No.	Nat.	Player	Class	Pos	Height	Weight	DoB	Hometown	Previous team	NHL rights
1	(Canada)	Nolan Kent	Graduate	G	5' 9" (1.75 m)	176 lb (80 kg)	1998-08-12	Chestermere, Alberta	Northern Michigan (CCHA)	—
2	(United States)	Max Osborne	Junior	D	5' 10" (1.78 m)	175 lb (79 kg)	1999-02-01	Anchorage, Alaska	Saint John's (MIAC)	—
4	(United States)	Davis Goukler	Freshman	D	6' 1" (1.85 m)	195 lb (88 kg)	2001-04-22	Atlanta, Georgia	Shreveport (NAHL)	—
6	(United States)	Brandon Lajoie	Freshman	F	5' 11" (1.8 m)	180 lb (82 kg)	2001-10-18	Eagle River, Alaska	St. Cloud (NAHL)	—
7	(United States)	Carson Kosobud	Sophomore	D	6' 0" (1.83 m)	186 lb (84 kg)	1999-06-04	Moorhead, Minnesota	Arizona State (NCAA)	—
8	(United States)	William Gilson	Freshman	D	6' 0" (1.83 m)	170 lb (77 kg)	2001-06-28	Old Greenwich, Connecticut	Aberdeen (NAHL)	—
9	(Canada)	Conor Cole	Freshman	F	5' 10" (1.78 m)	183 lb (83 kg)	2001-10-28	St. John's, Newfoundland and Labrador	Maryland (NAHL)	—
11	(United States)	Ben Almquist	Junior	F	6' 0" (1.83 m)	175 lb (79 kg)	1999-10-01	Victoria, Minnesota	Minnesota Duluth (NCHC)	—
13	(Canada)	Matt Kinash	Sophomore	F	6' 0" (1.83 m)	185 lb (84 kg)	1999-12-15	Edmonton, Alberta	UMass Lowell (HEA)	—
14	(Canada)	Connor Marritt	Junior	F	6' 1" (1.85 m)	174 lb (79 kg)	1999-03-14	Kelowna, British Columbia	Northern Michigan (CCHA)	—
15	(Canada)	Jamie Collins	Graduate	F	5' 7" (1.7 m)	160 lb (73 kg)	1997-09-21	Fergus, Ontario	Clarkson (ECAC)	—
19	(United States)	Rowan Miller	Freshman	F	5' 11" (1.8 m)	160 lb (73 kg)	2001-10-07	Phoenix, Arizona	Prince George (BCHL)	—
20	(United States)	Matt Allen	Junior	F	5' 10" (1.78 m)	168 lb (76 kg)	2000-05-13	Minco, Oklahoma	Massachusetts Lowell (HEA)	—
23	(United States)	Maximilion Helgeson	Sophomore	F	6' 1" (1.85 m)	185 lb (84 kg)	2000-12-05	Anchorage, Alaska	Lindenwood (ACHA)	—
24	(Canada)	Dorian Dawson	Graduate	D	6' 2" (1.88 m)	205 lb (93 kg)	1997-05-29	Barrie, Ontario	Brown (ECAC)	—
25	(United States)	Caleb Huffman	Freshman	D	6' 4" (1.93 m)	201 lb (91 kg)	2002-01-31	Fairbanks, Alaska	Kenai River (NAHL)	—
26	(Canada)	Dylan Finlay	Freshman	D	6' 1" (1.85 m)	178 lb (81 kg)	2001-10-24	L'Île-Bizard, Quebec	Powell River (BCHL)	—
28	(Canada)	Matt Johnson	Freshman	F	6' 1" (1.85 m)	195 lb (88 kg)	2001-11-25	Calgary, Alberta	Anchorage (NAHL)	—
29	(Canada)	Adam Tisdale	Graduate	F	5' 9" (1.75 m)	171 lb (78 kg)	1998-11-09	Cochrane, Alberta	Sacred Heart (AHA)	—
30	(Canada)	Jared Whale	Freshman	G	5' 11" (1.8 m)	195 lb (88 kg)	2002-11-01	Calgary, Alberta	Olds (AJHL)	—
32	(United States)	Joey Lamoreaux	Senior	G	6' 1" (1.85 m)	183 lb (83 kg)	1999-02-01	Shorewood, Wisconsin	St. Cloud State (NCHC)	—
37	(Canada)	Carter Belitski	Freshman	F	6' 1" (1.85 m)	180 lb (82 kg)	2001-01-13	Regina, Saskatchewan	Drumheller (AJHL)	—
44	(Canada)	James Darby	Freshman	D	6' 3" (1.91 m)	204 lb (93 kg)	2001-04-12	North Vancouver, British Columbia	Surrey (BCHL)	—
51	(United States)	Caleb Hite	Graduate	F	5' 11" (1.8 m)	190 lb (86 kg)	1997-02-11	Grand Blanc, Michigan	Alaska (NCAA)	—
63	(Canada)	Derek Hamelin	Graduate	D	5' 11" (1.8 m)	170 lb (77 kg)	1997-01-21	Mercier, Quebec	Canisius (AHA)	—
74	(United States)	Alex Gomez	Freshman	F	6' 4" (1.93 m)	185 lb (84 kg)	2001-07-18	Parker, Colorado	New Mexico (NAHL)	—
77	(Canada)	Brett Bamber	Freshman	D	5' 9" (1.75 m)	175 lb (79 kg)	2001-11-07	St. Albert, Alberta	Drayton Valley (AJHL)	—
86	(Canada)	Jarred White	Junior	F	5' 10" (1.78 m)	195 lb (88 kg)	1999-05-21	Edmonton, Alberta	Western Michigan (NCHC)	—

== Standings ==
2022–23 NCAA Division I Independent ice hockey standings
	Overall record					
	GP	W	L	T	GF	GA
#15 Alaska	34	22	10	2	104	74
Alaska Anchorage	28	8	19	1	66	106
Arizona State	39	18	21	0	115	112
Lindenwood	30	7	22	1	92	134
Long Island	36	13	22	1	116	123
Stonehill	25	17	6	2	102	95
Rankings: USCHO.com Top 20 Poll

== Schedule and results ==
Date	Time	Opponent^{#}	Rank^{#}	Site	TV	Decision	Result	Attendance	Record
Exhibition
September 23	7:07 PM	Simon Fraser*		Seawolf Sports Complex • Anchorage, Alaska (Exhibition)		Kent	L 0–1	666	
Regular Season
October 1	6:07 PM	#14 Western Michigan*		Seawolf Sports Complex • Anchorage, Alaska		Lamoreaux	W 3–1	830	1–0–0
October 2	5:07 PM	#14 Western Michigan*		Seawolf Sports Complex • Anchorage, Alaska		Kent	L 1–4	821	1–1–0
October 7	5:30 PM	at Colorado College*		Ed Robson Arena • Colorado Springs, Colorado	ATTRM	Lamoreaux	L 2–6	3,652	1–2–0
October 8	4:00 PM	at Colorado College*		Ed Robson Arena • Colorado Springs, Colorado		Kent	L 1–4	3,701	1–3–0
October 14	7:07 PM	UNLV*		Seawolf Sports Complex • Anchorage, Alaska (Exhibition)		Whale	W 8–0	881	
October 15	6:07 PM	UNLV*		Seawolf Sports Complex • Anchorage, Alaska (Exhibition)		Kent	W 2–1	813	
October 21	3:07 PM	at Northern Michigan*		Berry Events Center • Marquette, Michigan	FloHockey	Lamoreaux	L 1–9	2,481	1–4–0
October 22	2:07 AM	at Northern Michigan*		Berry Events Center • Marquette, Michigan	FloHockey	Kent	W 3–1	2,898	2–4–0
November 4	5:05 PM	at Air Force*		Cadet Ice Arena • Colorado Springs, Colorado		Lamoreaux	L 3–5	1,548	2–5–0
November 5	3:05 PM	at Air Force*		Cadet Ice Arena • Colorado Springs, Colorado	Altitude 2	Kent	L 1–3	1,774	2–6–0
November 11	5:00 PM	at Arizona State*		Mullett Arena • Tempe, Arizona		Kent	L 2–5	4,762	2–7–0
November 12	3:00 PM	at Arizona State*		Mullett Arena • Tempe, Arizona		Whale	L 0–3	4,787	2–8–0
November 16	5:00 PM	at UNLV*		City National Arena • Summerlin South, Nevada (Exhibition)		Lamoureaux	W 3–1	-	
November 17	3:00 PM	vs. Liberty*		City National Arena • Summerlin South, Nevada (Exhibition)		Whale	W 9–1	-	
December 2	7:07 PM	Simon Fraser*		Seawolf Sports Complex • Anchorage, Alaska (Exhibition)		Kent	W 6–0	502	
December 3	6:07 PM	Simon Fraser*		Seawolf Sports Complex • Anchorage, Alaska (Exhibition)		Lamoreaux	W 4–0	550	
December 9	7:07 PM	at Alaska*		Carlson Center • Fairbanks, Alaska (Governor's Cup)	FloHockey	Kent	L 2–5	2,712	2–9–0
December 10	7:07 PM	at Alaska*		Carlson Center • Fairbanks, Alaska (Governor's Cup)	FloHockey	Whale	L 2–7	3,034	2–10–0
December 16	7:07 PM	Alaska*		Seawolf Sports Complex • Anchorage, Alaska (Governor's Cup)		Lamoreaux	L 0–4	666	2–11–0
December 17	6:07 PM	Alaska*		Seawolf Sports Complex • Anchorage, Alaska (Governor's Cup)		Kent	L 0–1	810	2–12–0
December 30	2:05 PM	at #13 Massachusetts Lowell*		Tsongas Center • Lowell, Massachusetts	ESPN+	Whale	W 4–2	4,483	3–12–0
December 31	12:05 PM	at #13 Massachusetts Lowell*		Tsongas Center • Lowell, Massachusetts	ESPN+	Kent	W 3–2	3,543	4–12–0
January 6	3:05 PM	at Maine*		Alfond Arena • Orono, Maine	ESPN+	Lamoreaux	L 0–1	3,180	4–13–0
January 7	1:05 PM	at Maine*		Alfond Arena • Orono, Maine	ESPN+	Whale	L 3–4 ^{OT}	3,522	4–14–0
January 27	7:07 PM	Alaska*		Seawolf Sports Complex • Anchorage, Alaska (Governor's Cup)	FloHockey	Kent	L 3–4 ^{OT}	872	4–15–0
January 28	7:07 PM	at Alaska*		Carlson Center • Fairbanks, Alaska (Governor's Cup)	FloHockey	Whale	L 3–4 ^{OT}	3,423	4–16–0
February 23	3:15 PM	at #16 Connecticut*		Toscano Family Ice Forum • Storrs, Connecticut	ESPN+	Whale	L 3–4 ^{OT}	2,691	4–17–0
February 25	10:00 AM	at Long Island*		Northwell Health Ice Center • East Meadow, New York	ESPN+	Lamoreaux	W 4–0	500	5–17–0
February 26	3:15 PM	at Long Island*		Northwell Health Ice Center • East Meadow, New York	ESPN+	Kent	L 2–6	456	5–18–0
February 28	11:00 AM	at Long Island*		Northwell Health Ice Center • East Meadow, New York	ESPN+	Lamoreaux	W 5–3	300	6–18–0
March 3	7:07 PM	Arizona State*		Seawolf Sports Complex • Anchorage, Alaska		Whale	L 0–5	555	6–19–0
March 4	5:07 PM	Arizona State*		Seawolf Sports Complex • Anchorage, Alaska		Kent	W 4–3	666	7–19–0
March 10	7:07 PM	Lindenwood*		Seawolf Sports Complex • Anchorage, Alaska		Lamoreaux	T 7–7 ^{OT}	455	7–19–1
March 11	6:07 PM	Lindenwood*		Seawolf Sports Complex • Anchorage, Alaska		Kent	W 4–3 ^{OT}	475	8–19–1
*Non-conference game. ^{#}Rankings from USCHO.com Poll. All times are in Alaska Time. Source:

== Scoring statistics ==
Name	Position	Games	Goals	Assists	Points	PIM
Maximilion Helgeson	F	28	11	11	22	18
Ben Almquist	F	28	6	14	20	8
Connor Marritt	F	28	7	9	16	10
Matt Allen	F	27	7	7	14	22
William Gilson	D	27	6	8	14	38
Caleb Hite	F	27	5	6	11	23
Brett Bamber	D	26	4	6	10	19
Derek Hamelin	D	26	0	10	10	12
Jarred White	LW	24	2	6	8	26
Jamie Collins	F	27	3	4	7	8
Carson Kosobud	D	27	1	6	7	44
Brandon Lajoie	LW	16	3	2	5	8
Dylan Finlay	D	27	3	2	5	14
Conor Cole	C	24	1	4	5	8
Alex Gomez	C/W	24	2	2	4	2
Max Osborne	D	19	0	4	4	4
Davis Goukler	D	17	2	1	3	6
Matt Johnson	F	24	2	1	3	8
Caleb Huffman	D	12	1	0	1	6
Rowan Miller	F	6	0	1	1	4
Joey Lamoreaux	G	10	0	1	1	0
James Darby	D	13	0	1	1	4
Nolan Kent	G	15	0	1	1	0
Matt Kinash	D	20	0	1	1	16
Carter Belitski	D	25	0	1	1	14
Adam Tisdale	C	2	0	0	0	2
Jared Whale	G	7	0	0	0	0
Total			66	109	175	324

== Goaltending statistics ==
Name	Games	Minutes	Wins	Losses	Ties	Goals against	Saves	Shut outs	SV %	GAA
Nolan Kent	16	746:33	4	8	0	39	375	0	.906	3.13
Joey Lamoreaux	13	529:52	3	5	1	34	255	1	.882	3.85
Jared Whale	10	406:13	1	6	0	28	248	0	.899	4.14
Empty Net	-	13:14	-	-	-	5	-	-	-	-
Total	28	1695:52	8	19	1	106	878	1	.897	3.75

== Rankings ==
Poll	Week																											
Poll	Pre	1	2	3	4	5	6	7	8	9	10	11	12	13	14	15	16	17	18	19	20	21	22	23	24	25	26	27 (Final)
USCHO.com	NR	-	NR	NR	NR	NR	NR	NR	NR	NR	NR	NR	NR	-	NR	NR	NR	NR	NR	NR	NR	NR	NR	NR	NR	NR	-	NR
USA Today	NR	NR	NR	NR	NR	NR	NR	NR	NR	NR	NR	NR	NR	NR	NR	NR	NR	NR	NR	NR	NR	NR	NR	NR	NR	NR	NR	NR

Note: USCHO did not release a poll in weeks 1, 13, or 26.
