= 2022–23 Alaska Nanooks men's ice hockey season =

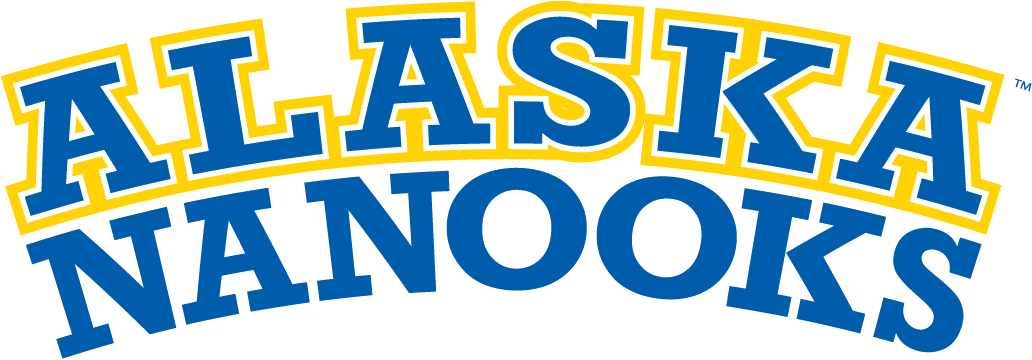
- Conference: Independent
- Home ice: Carlson Center

Rankings
- USCHO: #15
- USA Today: #15

Record
- Overall: 22–10–2
- Home: 10–2–1
- Road: 12–8–1

Coaches and captains
- Head coach: Erik Largen
- Assistant coaches: Chris Brown; Lenny Hoffman; Eric Yancey
- Captain(s): Harrison Israels; Garrett Pyke

The 2022–23 Alaska Nanooks men's ice hockey season was the 73rd season of play for the program and the 38th at the Division I level. The Nanooks represented the University of Alaska Fairbanks and were coached by Erik Largen in his 4th season.

== Season ==
With nearly half of the team's roster changing in the offseason, Alaska was a mystery when the season began. Senior transfer Matt Radomsky was given control of the crease but the rest of the team would take some time to sort out. Unsurprisingly, it took the offense a while to build some chemistry as the Nanooks averaged slightly more than 2 goals per game over the first two months of the season. That wasn't much improvement over the year before, however, whereas they had started out 1–12 the previous season, the 2023 Nanooks were in a much better position. The defense, led by co-captain Garrett Pyke, did a tremendous job insulating Radomsky and allowed an average of less than 25 shots against per game. The relatively light workload and Radomsky's strong play helped keep the team afloat in the early part of the season and they held a .500 record by mid-November.

Just before Thanksgiving, Alaska travelled south to take on #7 Penn State. Though they lost both games, each defeat was only by a single goal and demonstrated that the Nanooks could compete with the college hockey elite. After the winter break Alaska fulfilled that promise by splitting two consecutive weekends against ranked opponents, including then-#1 Denver. With a winning record and several impressive wins, the Nanooks were suddenly alive for the NCAA tournament berth, having risen up to 22nd in the national rankings. After a couple of weeks off, Alaska entered the stretch run of its season with 12 games remaining. Alaska had a fairly easy slate of games but this left them with catch-22; because they weren't going to participate in a conference tournament, Alaska would have to be at least #15 in the national rankings to make the NCAA tournament. To do that they needed to win, however, they wouldn't get much credit for wins over low-ranked teams. Of all their opponents in those final 12 games, only Arizona State was above 50 (out of 61 teams) and they were still in the bottom half. Because of this, Alaska would likely need to go undefeated, or very close to, to have any chance of getting into the top 15. With little room for error, that's exactly what the Nanooks did.

Over a 6-week span, Alaska's offense came into its own and helped the team go 11–1 to end the regular season. The streak gave the team its first 20-win season in 21 years and raised them up to #12 in the rankings. However, when the team finished its schedule on March 4, many other clubs still had games to play. Alaska had to wait and see how the rest of the teams fared before they could punch their ticket to the tournament. By mid-March they had been overtaken by Minnesota State and, as the conference tournaments progressed, they were pushed down to #15. Entering championship weekend, Alaska was in the final position for an at-large bid but were in a relatively good position. For various reasons, the winners of the Atlantic Hockey, Big Ten and CCHA tournaments would not affect the Nanooks. What Alaska needed was for each of the ECAC Hockey, Hockey East and NCHC to be won by a team that was ranked higher than the Nanooks. While Hockey East and the NCHC obliged, Colgate stunned three higher-seeded teams to capture the ECAC crown. That upset shrunk the at-large field to the top-14 teams, leaving Alaska out in the cold.

In spite of the misfortune at the end, this was still the best season for the Nanooks in 35 years, the final season of the Great West Hockey Conference.

== Departures ==
Player	Position	Nationality	Cause
Jakob Breault	Forward	Canada	Left program (retired)
Antonio Di Paolo	Defenseman	Canada	Left program (retired)
Filip Fornåå Svensson	Forward	Sweden	Transferred to Massachusetts Lowell
Gustavs Dāvis Grigals	Goaltender	Latvia	Graduate transfer to Massachusetts Lowell
Didrik Henbrant	Forward	Sweden	Transferred to Maine
Caleb Hite	Forward	United States	Graduation (retired)
Kristaps Jākobsons	Defenseman	Latvia	Left program (retired)
Roberts Kaļķis	Defenseman	Latvia	Signed professional contract (Iisalmen Peli-Karhut)
Matt McKim	Forward	Canada	Transferred to Acadia
Riley Murphy	Forward	United States	Left program (retired)
Jordan Muzzillo	Defenseman	United States	Graduation (signed with Wichita Thunder)
Austin Ryman	Goaltender	United States	Transferred to Bethel
Nátán Vertes	Forward	Hungary	Signed professional contract (Fehérvár AV19)
Antti Virtanen	Defenseman	Finland	Graduation (signed with Tappara)
Ēriks Žohovs	Forward	Latvia	Left mid-season; signed professional contract (Fehérvár AV19)

== Recruiting ==
Player	Position	Nationality	Age	Notes
Braden Birnie	Forward	Canada	21	Weyburn, SK
Kyle Gaffney	Forward	United States	21	Plymouth, MI
Will Hilfiker	Defenseman	United States	21	Middletown, NJ
Xavier Jean-Louis	Defenseman	United States	21	Miami, FL
Ricards Landmanis	Defenseman	Latvia	20	Ventspils, LAT
Lassi Lehti	Goaltender	Finland	20	Espoo, FIN
T. J. Lloyd	Defenseman	Canada	22	Lloydminster, SK; transfer from Bowling Green
A. J. Macaulay	Defenseman	Canada	20	Bonnyville, AB
Cade Neilson	Forward	England	21	Lafayette, LA
Matteo Pecchia	Forward	Canada	22	Nobleton, ON; transfer from Western Michigan
Zachary Power	Forward	Canada	21	Glencoe, ON
Matt Radomsky	Goaltender	Canada	23	Winnipeg, MB; transfer from Holy Cross
Quinn Rudrud	Forward	United States	21	Farmington, MN
Jonny Sorenson	Forward	United States	22	St. Louis Park, MN; transfer from Minnesota

== Roster ==
As of August 12, 2022.

No.	Nat.	Player	Class	Pos	Height	Weight	DoB	Hometown	Previous team	NHL rights
1	(Canada)	Daniel Allin	Sophomore	G	6' 2" (1.88 m)	185 lb (84 kg)	2000-02-11	Edmonton, Alberta	Drumheller (AJHL)	—
2	(Sweden)	Karl Falk	Sophomore	D	6' 3" (1.91 m)	205 lb (93 kg)	2000-01-20	Västerås, Sweden	Minnesota Magicians (NAHL)	—
4	(United States)	Jonny Sorenson	Senior	F	6' 1" (1.85 m)	180 lb (82 kg)	1999-09-21	St. Louis Park, Minnesota	Minnesota (Big Ten)	—
5	(Latvia)	Markuss Komuls	Junior	D	5' 10" (1.78 m)	187 lb (85 kg)	1998-01-04	Talsi, Latvia	Kenai River (NAHL)	—
6	(Canada)	T. J. Lloyd	Senior	D	5' 9" (1.75 m)	172 lb (78 kg)	1999-11-15	Lloydminster, Saskatchewan	Bowling Green (CCHA)	—
7	(Canada)	Garrett Pyke (C)	Junior	D	6' 1" (1.85 m)	190 lb (86 kg)	1999-08-01	Toronto, Ontario	Oakville (OJHL)	—
8	(United States)	Will Hilfiker	Freshman	D	6' 2" (1.88 m)	205 lb (93 kg)	2001-08-07	Middletown, New Jersey	Bonnyville (AJHL)	—
10	(Latvia)	Ēriks Žohovs	Junior	F	6' 0" (1.83 m)	196 lb (89 kg)	1997-11-26	Riga, Latvia	Zemgale (LHL)	—
11	(Canada)	Brady Risk	Sophomore	F	5' 9" (1.75 m)	175 lb (79 kg)	1999-03-16	Medicine Hat, Alberta	Drumheller (AJHL)	—
12	(Canada)	A. J. Macaulay	Freshman	D	5' 9" (1.75 m)	175 lb (79 kg)	2002-04-12	Bonnyville, Alberta	Bonnyville (AJHL)	—
13	(Canada)	Xavier Jean-Louis	Freshman	D	6' 4" (1.93 m)	200 lb (91 kg)	2001-06-25	Montreal, Quebec	Austin (NAHL)	—
14	(Russia)	Anton Rubtsov	Sophomore	F	5' 10" (1.78 m)	165 lb (75 kg)	1999-03-06	Saint Petersburg, Russia	Shreveport (NAHL)	—
15	(Canada)	Braden Birnie	Freshman	F	6' 3" (1.91 m)	185 lb (84 kg)	2001-08-19	Weyburn, Saskatchewan	Steinbach (MJHL)	—
16	(Canada)	Chase Dubois	Sophomore (RS)	F	5' 9" (1.75 m)	160 lb (73 kg)	1998-03-12	Williams Lake, British Columbia	West Kelowna (BCHL)	—
17	(Canada)	Colin Doyle	Senior	F	5' 10" (1.78 m)	185 lb (84 kg)	1998-05-12	Campbellford, Ontario	Wellington (OJHL)	—
18	(Canada)	Zachary Power	Freshman	F	6' 0" (1.83 m)	190 lb (86 kg)	2001-09-10	Glencoe, Ontario	Steinbach (MJHL)	—
20	(Sweden)	Simon Falk	Sophomore	F	6' 3" (1.91 m)	200 lb (91 kg)	2000-01-20	Västerås, Sweden	Minnesota Magicians (NAHL)	—
23	(Latvia)	Ričards Landmanis	Freshman	D	6' 6" (1.98 m)	192 lb (87 kg)	2001-10-02	Ventspils, Latvia	Collingwood (OJHL)	—
24	(Canada)	Harrison Israels (C)	Sophomore	F	6' 1" (1.85 m)	200 lb (91 kg)	1999-09-01	Mississauga, Ontario	Oakville (OJHL)	—
25	(England)	Cade Neilson	Freshman	F	6' 0" (1.83 m)	195 lb (88 kg)	2001-05-15	Nottingham, England	Aberdeen (NAHL)	—
26	(United States)	Payton Matsui	Sophomore	F	5' 7" (1.7 m)	160 lb (73 kg)	2000-04-15	Lakeville, Minnesota	Aberdeen (NAHL)	—
27	(Canada)	Matteo Pecchia	Sophomore	F	5' 11" (1.8 m)	192 lb (87 kg)	2000-06-05	Nobleton, Ontario	Western Michigan (NCHC)	—
28	(Canada)	Brayden Nicholetts	Sophomore	F	5' 11" (1.8 m)	180 lb (82 kg)	1999-08-27	Spruce Grove, Alberta	Spruce Grove (AJHL)	—
29	(United States)	Quinn Rudrud	Freshman	F	6' 3" (1.91 m)	188 lb (85 kg)	2001-08-18	Farmington, Minnesota	Bismarck (NAHL)	—
31	(Canada)	Matt Radomsky	Senior	G	6' 2" (1.88 m)	185 lb (84 kg)	1999-06-21	Winnipeg, Manitoba	Holy Cross (AHA)	—
32	(Canada)	Connor Mylymok	Sophomore	F	6' 1" (1.85 m)	205 lb (93 kg)	2000-03-18	Wilcox, Saskatchewan	Austin (NAHL)	—
34	(United States)	Kyle Gaffney	Freshman	F	6' 0" (1.83 m)	180 lb (82 kg)	2001-09-05	Plymouth, Michigan	Aberdeen (NAHL)	—
35	(Finland)	Lassi Lehti	Freshman	G	6' 3" (1.91 m)	210 lb (95 kg)	2001-11-29	Espoo, Finland	Minot (NAHL)	—
38	(Latvia)	Arvils Bergmanis	Sophomore	D	5' 11" (1.8 m)	187 lb (85 kg)	1999-12-29	Riga, Latvia	Olimp Riga (LHL)	—
40	(United States)	Matt Koethe	Sophomore	F	5' 10" (1.78 m)	185 lb (84 kg)	1999-09-28	Minnetonka, Minnesota	Fairbanks (NAHL)	—

== Standings ==
2022–23 NCAA Division I Independent ice hockey standings
	Overall record					
	GP	W	L	T	GF	GA
#15 Alaska	34	22	10	2	104	74
Alaska Anchorage	28	8	19	1	66	106
Arizona State	39	18	21	0	115	112
Lindenwood	30	7	22	1	92	134
Long Island	36	13	22	1	116	123
Stonehill	25	17	6	2	102	95
Rankings: USCHO.com Top 20 Poll

== Schedule and results ==
Date	Time	Opponent^{#}	Rank^{#}	Site	TV	Decision	Result	Attendance	Record
Exhibition
September 24	7:07 PM	Simon Fraser*		Carlson Center • Fairbanks, Alaska (Exhibition)	FloHockey	Radomsky	W 6–0	1,612	
Regular Season
October 1	7:07 PM	American International*		Carlson Center • Fairbanks, Alaska	FloHockey	Radomsky	T 1–1 ^{OT}	1,950	0–0–1
October 2	4:07 PM	American International*		Carlson Center • Fairbanks, Alaska	FloHockey	Radomsky	W 2–1	1,410	1–0–1
October 7	4:07 PM	at St. Thomas*		St. Thomas Ice Arena • Mendota Heights, Minnesota	FloHockey	Radomsky	W 4–2	821	2–0–1
October 8	3:07 PM	at St. Thomas*		St. Thomas Ice Arena • Mendota Heights, Minnesota	FloHockey	Radomsky	L 2–3 ^{OT}	738	2–1–1
October 13	7:37 PM	Michigan Tech*		Carlson Center • Fairbanks, Alaska	FloHockey	Radomsky	L 0–2	1,912	2–2–1
October 14	7:07 PM	Michigan Tech*		Carlson Center • Fairbanks, Alaska	FloHockey	Radomsky	L 2–6	2,124	2–3–1
October 21	4:00 PM	at Omaha*		Baxter Arena • Omaha, Nebraska		Radomsky	W 3–2 ^{OT}	6,414	3–3–1
October 23	11:00 AM	at Omaha*		Baxter Arena • Omaha, Nebraska		Radomsky	L 2–3 ^{OT}	4,697	3–4–1
October 28	3:07 PM	at Northern Michigan*		Berry Events Center • Marquette, Michigan	FloHockey	Radomsky	W 2–1	2,338	4–4–1
October 29	2:07 PM	at Northern Michigan*		Berry Events Center • Marquette, Michigan	FloHockey	Radomsky	L 2–3	2,321	4–5–1
November 18	3:00 PM	at Rensselaer*		Houston Field House • Troy, New York	ESPN+	Radomsky	W 3–1	1,965	5–5–1
November 19	3:00 PM	at Rensselaer*		Houston Field House • Troy, New York	ESPN+	Radomsky	T 3–3	1,711	5–5–2
November 22	3:00 PM	at #7 Penn State*		Pegula Ice Arena • University Park, Pennsylvania		Radomsky	L 2–3	5,271	5–6–2
November 23	1:00 PM	at #7 Penn State*		Pegula Ice Arena • University Park, Pennsylvania		Radomsky	L 1–2	5,521	5–7–2
December 9	7:07 PM	Alaska Anchorage*		Carlson Center • Fairbanks, Alaska (Governor's Cup)	FloHockey	Radomsky	W 5–2	2,712	6–7–2
December 10	7:07 PM	Alaska Anchorage*		Carlson Center • Fairbanks, Alaska (Governor's Cup)	FloHockey	Radomsky	W 7–2	3,034	7–7–2
December 16	7:07 PM	at Alaska Anchorage*		Seawolf Sports Complex • Anchorage, Alaska (Governor's Cup)		Radomsky	W 4–0	666	8–7–2
December 17	6:07 PM	at Alaska Anchorage*		Seawolf Sports Complex • Anchorage, Alaska (Governor's Cup)		Radomsky	W 1–0	810	9–7–2
December 31	1:00 PM	at #19 Notre Dame*		Compton Family Ice Arena • Notre Dame, Indiana	Peacock	Radomsky	W 3–2	4,878	10–7–2
January 1	1:00 PM	at #19 Notre Dame*		Compton Family Ice Arena • Notre Dame, Indiana	Peacock	Radomsky	L 0–2	4,911	10–8–2
January 6	5:00 PM	at #1 Denver*		Magness Arena • Denver, Colorado	Altitude 2	Radomsky	W 3–1	6,221	11–8–2
January 7	4:00 PM	at #1 Denver*		Magness Arena • Denver, Colorado		Radomsky	L 2–7	6,254	11–9–2
January 27	7:07 PM	at Alaska Anchorage*		Seawolf Sports Complex • Anchorage, Alaska (Governor's Cup)		Radomsky	W 4–3 ^{OT}	872	12–9–2
January 28	7:07 PM	Alaska Anchorage*		Carlson Center • Fairbanks, Alaska (Governor's Cup)	FloHockey	Radomsky	W 4–3 ^{OT}	3,423	13–9–2
February 3	7:07 PM	Arizona State*		Carlson Center • Fairbanks, Alaska	FloHockey	Radomsky	W 2–1	2,016	14–9–2
February 4	7:07 PM	Arizona State*		Carlson Center • Fairbanks, Alaska	FloHockey	Radomsky	W 5–2	2,892	15–9–2
February 10	11:00 AM	at Long Island*	#20	Northwell Health Ice Center • East Meadow, New York	ESPN+	Radomsky	W 5–3	372	16–9–2
February 11	10:00 AM	at Long Island*	#20	Northwell Health Ice Center • East Meadow, New York	ESPN+	Radomsky	L 1–3	230	16–10–2
February 17	7:07 PM	Long Island*		Carlson Center • Fairbanks, Alaska	FloHockey	Radomsky	W 3–2	1,912	17–10–2
February 18	7:07 PM	Long Island*		Carlson Center • Fairbanks, Alaska	FloHockey	Radomsky	W 6–3	2,817	18–10–2
February 24	5:00 PM	at Arizona State*		Mullett Arena • Tempe, Arizona	Pac-12 Insider	Radomsky	W 4–2	4,716	19–10–2
February 25	5:00 PM	at Arizona State*		Mullett Arena • Tempe, Arizona		Radomsky	W 4–2	5,010	20–10–2
March 3	7:07 PM	Lindenwood*	#18	Carlson Center • Fairbanks, Alaska	FloHockey	Radomsky	W 4–1	2,417	21–10–2
March 4	7:07 PM	Lindenwood*	#18	Carlson Center • Fairbanks, Alaska	FloHockey	Radomsky	W 8–0	3,562	22–10–2
*Non-conference game. ^{#}Rankings from USCHO.com Poll. All times are in Alaska Time. Source:

== Scoring statistics ==
Name	Position	Games	Goals	Assists	Points	PIM
Jonny Sorenson	F	34	10	18	28	19
Payton Matsui	F	34	9	19	28	6
Brady Risk	F	33	13	10	23	22
Chase Dubois	F	34	11	11	22	6
Garrett Pyke	D	34	4	15	19	40
Anton Rubtsov	F	33	5	12	17	22
T. J. Lloyd	D	34	3	13	16	10
Harrison Israels	C	34	9	6	15	12
Kyle Gaffney	F	33	5	8	13	13
Matt Koethe	F	34	5	7	12	33
Simon Falk	RW	32	9	2	11	8
Markuss Komuls	D	34	3	8	11	16
Arvils Bergmanis	D	34	3	8	11	79
Brayden Nicholetts	F	19	3	6	9	24
Colin Doyle	C	27	3	6	9	6
A. J. Macaulay	D	33	2	7	9	12
Connor Mylymok	LW	29	1	7	8	83
Karl Falk	D	31	3	2	5	24
Braden Birnie	F	16	2	3	5	19
Xavier Jean-Louis	D	13	0	3	3	4
Cade Neilson	C	18	0	2	2	8
Zachary Power	C	5	1	0	1	4
Will Hilfiker	D	5	0	1	1	0
Matt Radomsky	G	34	0	1	1	0
Lassi Lehti	G	1	0	0	0	0
Daniel Allin	G	2	0	0	0	0
Ēriks Žohovs	C	4	0	0	0	5
Matteo Pecchia	LW	4	0	0	0	2
Total			104	175	279	477

== Goaltending statistics ==
Name	Games	Minutes	Wins	Losses	Ties	Goals against	Saves	Shut outs	SV %	GAA
Matt Radomsky	34	1992:08	22	10	2	68	742	2	.916	2.05
Daniel Allin	2	40:06	0	0	0	2	13	0	.867	2.99
Lassi Lehti	1	10:47	0	0	0	1	5	0	.833	5.56
Empty Net	-	16:59	-	-	-	3	-	-	-	-
Total	34	2060:00	22	10	2	74	760	2	.911	2.16

== Rankings ==
Poll	Week																											
Poll	Pre	1	2	3	4	5	6	7	8	9	10	11	12	13	14	15	16	17	18	19	20	21	22	23	24	25	26	27 (Final)
USCHO.com	NR	-	NR	NR	NR	NR	NR	NR	NR	NR	NR	NR	NR	-	NR	NR	NR	NR	NR	20	NR	NR	18	16	15	15	-	15
USA Today	NR	NR	NR	NR	NR	NR	NR	NR	NR	NR	NR	NR	NR	NR	NR	NR	NR	NR	NR	NR	NR	NR	19	15	15	15	15	15

Note: USCHO did not release a poll in weeks 1, 13, or 26.
