= 2022–23 LIU Sharks men's ice hockey season =

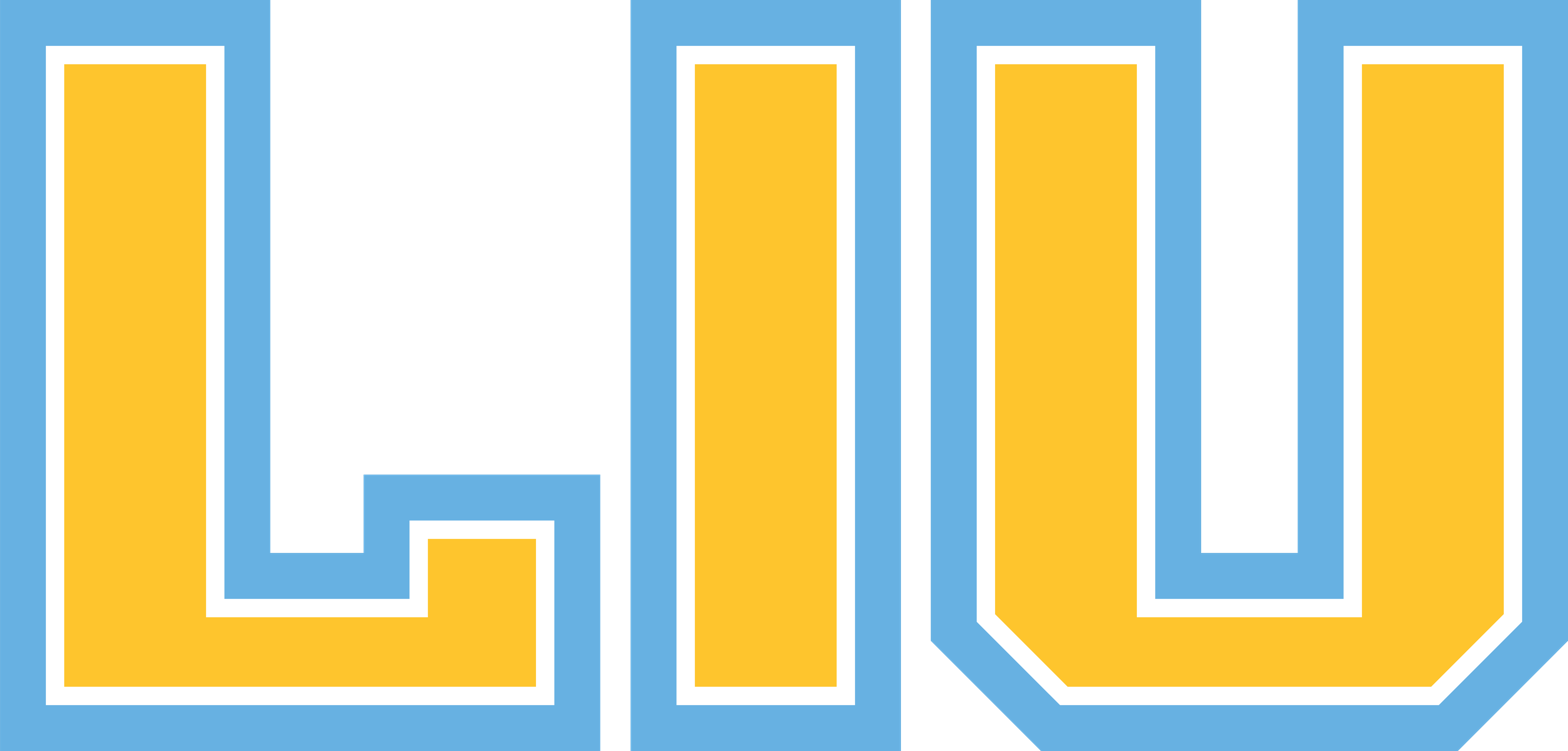
- Conference: Independent
- Home ice: Northwell Health Ice Center

Rankings
- USCHO: NR
- USA Today: NR

Record
- Overall: 13–22–1
- Home: 10–10–0
- Road: 3–12–1

Coaches and captains
- Head coach: Brett Riley
- Assistant coaches: Will Messa; Rob Riley; Mike Mammone

The 2022–23 LIU Sharks men's ice hockey season was the 3rd season of play for the program. The Sharks represented Long Island University and were coached by Brett Riley, in his 3rd season.

== Season ==
LIU entered the season hoping to continue its upward trend, however, they would first have to contend with a major obstacle. More than half of the roster changed in the offseason, including most of the leading scorers. 18 new players were brought in to fill in the gaps with about a third transferring from other programs. The lack of familiarity showed early in the year when the offense had trouble getting on track. In its first 10 games, the Sharks scored just 23 goals and lost 8 of those contests. Excluding the game against Stonehill, who were playing their first game as an equal Division I member, Long Island could barely generate any offense and well out of it just a month into the season. Evan a surprise tie with Quinnipiac didn't do much to improve the team's outlook.

The situation in goal was better, but not by much. Starter Vinnie Purpura was inconsistent during the year but did provide some highlight for the team. His brightest performance came against Ohio State by making 32 saves in the program's first win over a ranked team. That victory came during a 5–2 run, however, because the Sharks were still having to schedule Division II opponents to fill out their schedule, only two of those wins were counted for the national rankings.

The lack of stability on the back end caused LIU to miss several more chances at wins. It got to the point where coach Riley turned to backup Brandon Perrone for help in goal. After changing to goaltender rotation, the Sharks started winning more, however they also began playing some of the worst teams in college hockey. A 5-game winning streak that the team put together in January and February came with four of those games being played against the two newest Division I teams, Stonehill and Lindenwood. The Sharks were able to post a win over tournament hopeful Alaska, but the team ended up stumbling to the finish with a 2–7 skid.

== Departures ==
Player	Position	Nationality	Cause
Max Balinson	Defenseman	Canada	Graduation (signed with Cincinnati Cyclones)
Zack Bross	Forward	United States	Graduation (signed with Worcester Railers)
Kristofer Carlson	Goaltender	United States	Graduation (retired)
Daine Dubois	Forward	Canada	Left program (retired)
Carter Ekberg	Defenseman	United States	Graduation (retired)
Jacob Franczak	Forward	Canada	Transferred to Skidmore
Tanner Hopps	Forward	Canada	Left program (retired)
Billy Jerry	Forward	United States	Graduation (signed with Adirondack Thunder)
P. J. Marrocco	Forward	Canada	Graduation (retired)
Robert McCollum	Defenseman	Canada	Transferred to UNLV
Nolan McElhaney	Defenseman	United States	Left program (retired)
Carson Musser	Defenseman	United States	Graduation (signed with Norfolk Admirals)
Derek Osik	Forward	United States	Graduation (signed with Evansville Thunderbolts)
Jake Stevens	Defenseman	United States	Graduation (signed with Iowa Heartlanders)
Justin Thompson	Forward	United States	Left program (retired)
Jordan Timmons	Forward	United States	Graduation (signed with Idaho Steelheads)
Tyler Welsh	Forward	Canada	Graduation (signed with Newfoundland Growlers)
Marty Westhaver	Forward	Canada	Left program (retired)
Aaron White	Forward	United States	Left program (retired)

== Recruiting ==
Player	Position	Nationality	Age	Notes
Daniel Baldassarra	Forward	Canada	20	Vaughan, ON
Austin Brimmer	Forward	Canada	20	Markham, ON
A. J. Casperson	Defenseman	United States	21	Flower Mound, TX
Adam Goodsir	Forward	United States	24	Okemos, MI; graduate transfer from Michigan State
Xan Gurney	Defenseman	United States	22	Grosse Ile, MI; transfer from Western Michigan
Santeri Hartikainen	Forward	Finland	23	Edmonton, AB; transfer from American International
Noah Kane	Forward	United States	22	Buffalo, NY; transfer from Mercyhurst
Tyler Kostelecky	Forward	United States	21	Maple Grove, MN
Patriks Marcinkēvičs	Forward	Latvia	21	Riga, LAT
Cade Mason	Defenseman	Canada	21	Red Deer, AB
Chris Pappas	Forward	Canada	21	Etobicoke, ON; transfer from St. Lawrence
Valtteri Piironen	Defenseman	Finland	21	Pyhäselkä, FIN
Austin Rook	Defenseman	United States	25	Shrewsbury, MA; graduate transfer from Skidmore
Jan Škorpík	Goaltender	Czech Republic	21	Brandys nad Labem, CZE
Anthony Vincent	Forward	United States	25	Wilton, CT; graduate transfer from Holy Cross
Riley Wallack	Forward	Canada	21	South Surrey, BC
Josh Zary	Forward	Canada	20	Nanaimo, BC

== Roster ==
No.	Nat.	Player	Class	Pos	Height	Weight	DoB	Hometown	Previous team	NHL rights
2	(United States)	Austin Rook	Graduate	D	6' 2" (1.88 m)	210 lb (95 kg)	1997-03-04	Shrewsbury, Massachusetts	Skidmore College (NEHC)	—
3	(United States)	A. J. Casperson	Freshman	D	6' 2" (1.88 m)	190 lb (86 kg)	2001-07-19	Flower Mound, Texas	Janesville Jets (NAHL)	—
4	(United States)	Spencer Cox	Sophomore	D	6' 0" (1.83 m)	180 lb (82 kg)	2001-02-07	Powell, Ohio	Chippewa Steel (NAHL)	—
5	(Finland)	Valtteri Piironen	Freshman	D	6' 4" (1.93 m)	201 lb (91 kg)	2001-09-11	Joensuu, Finland	Sioux Falls Stampede (USHL)	—
6	(Canada)	Cade Mason	Freshman	D	5' 11" (1.8 m)	176 lb (80 kg)	2001-08-26	Red Deer, Alberta	Spruce Grove Saints (AJHL)	—
7	(Canada)	Jordan Di Cicco	Junior	D	5' 9" (1.75 m)	180 lb (82 kg)	1999-03-17	London, Ontario	Brooks Bandits (AJHL)	—
8	(Canada)	Isaiah Fox	Sophomore	F	5' 11" (1.8 m)	163 lb (74 kg)	2000-07-05	Montreal, Quebec	Maine Nordiques (NAHL)	—
9	(Canada)	Daniel Baldassarra	Freshman	F	5' 10" (1.78 m)	170 lb (77 kg)	2002-03-15	Woodbridge, Ontario	North York Rangers (OJHL)	—
10	(United States)	Tyler Kostelecky	Freshman	F	5' 9" (1.75 m)	176 lb (80 kg)	2001-06-23	Maple Grove, Minnesota	Waterloo Black Hawks (USHL)	—
11	(Canada)	Chris Pappas	Sophomore	F	5' 11" (1.8 m)	175 lb (79 kg)	2000-11-26	Toronto, Ontario	St. Lawrence (ECAC)	—
12	(United States)	Zachary Nazzarett	Junior	F	5' 8" (1.73 m)	155 lb (70 kg)	2000-08-25	Cheektowaga, New York	New Jersey Titans (NAHL)	—
13	(Canada)	Josh Zary	Freshman	F	6' 0" (1.83 m)	190 lb (86 kg)	2001-10-15	Nanaimo, British Columbia	Alberni Valley Bulldogs (BCHL)	—
14	(United States)	Adam Goodsir	Graduate	F	6' 1" (1.85 m)	195 lb (88 kg)	1998-09-22	Okemos, Michigan	Michigan State (Big Ten)	—
16	(United States)	Xan Gurney	Freshman (RS)	D	6' 3" (1.91 m)	205 lb (93 kg)	2000-05-28	Grosse Ile, Michigan	Western Michigan (NCHC)	—
17	(Canada)	Nolan Welsh	Junior	F	6' 0" (1.83 m)	185 lb (84 kg)	1999-06-23	Whistler, British Columbia	Prince George Spruce Kings (BCHL)	—
19	(United States)	Jack Quinn	Junior	F	5' 10" (1.78 m)	185 lb (84 kg)	1999-12-28	Lancaster, Massachusetts	Kenai River Brown Bears (NAHL)	—
20	(Sweden)	Gustav Müller	Junior	F	6' 0" (1.83 m)	192 lb (87 kg)	1999-04-23	Hudiksvall, Sweden	Madison Capitols (USHL)	—
21	(Canada)	Austin Brimmer	Freshman	F	6' 3" (1.91 m)	218 lb (99 kg)	2001-10-10	Markham, Ontario	Shreveport Mudbugs (ECAC)	—
22	(Canada)	Riley Wallack	Freshman	F	6' 5" (1.96 m)	225 lb (102 kg)	2001-04-05	South Surrey, British Columbia	Langley Rivermen (BCHL)	—
23	(Canada)	Ethan Martini	Sophomore	D	6' 7" (2.01 m)	195 lb (88 kg)	2000-10-04	Trail, British Columbia	Penticton Vees (BCHL)	—
24	(United States)	John Gormley	Sophomore	D	6' 4" (1.93 m)	225 lb (102 kg)	2000-08-19	Bronx, New York	Bismarck Bobcats (NAHL)	—
25	(Canada)	Preston Brodziak	Junior	F	6' 0" (1.83 m)	185 lb (84 kg)	1999-06-29	Estevan, Saskatchewan	Prince George Spruce Kings (BCHL)	—
26	(Finland)	Santeri Hartikainen	Senior	F	6' 1" (1.85 m)	200 lb (91 kg)	1999-01-05	Helsinki, Finland	American International (AHA)	—
27	(Latvia)	Patriks Marcinkēvičs	Freshman	F	5' 9" (1.75 m)	168 lb (76 kg)	2001-05-06	Riga, Latvia	Jersey Hitmen (NCDC)	—
29	(United States)	Vincent Purpura	Senior	G	6' 6" (1.98 m)	194 lb (88 kg)	1998-10-29	Lemont, Illinois	Boston University (HEA)	—
30	(Czech Republic)	Jan Škorpík	Freshman	G	6' 1" (1.85 m)	177 lb (80 kg)	2001-02-24	Brandýs nad Labem, Czech Republic	Lone Star Brahmas (NAHL)	—
34	(United States)	Anthony Vincent	Graduate	F	6' 0" (1.83 m)	190 lb (86 kg)	1997-08-12	Darien, Connecticut	Holy Cross (AHA)	—
35	(United States)	Brandon Perrone	Senior	G	5' 10" (1.78 m)	165 lb (75 kg)	1998-10-26	Smithtown, New York	Alaska Anchorage (WCHA)	—
44	(United States)	Noah Kane	Junior	F	5' 11" (1.8 m)	183 lb (83 kg)	1999-11-27	Buffalo, New York	Mercyhurst (AHA)	—
55	(Canada)	Dylan Schuett	Sophomore	F	6' 1" (1.85 m)	215 lb (98 kg)	2000-09-24	Medicine Hat, Alberta	Northeast Generals (NAHL)	—

== Standings ==
2022–23 NCAA Division I Independent ice hockey standings
	Overall record					
	GP	W	L	T	GF	GA
#15 Alaska	34	22	10	2	104	74
Alaska Anchorage	28	8	19	1	66	106
Arizona State	39	18	21	0	115	112
Lindenwood	30	7	22	1	92	134
Long Island	36	13	22	1	116	123
Stonehill	25	17	6	2	102	95
Rankings: USCHO.com Top 20 Poll

== Schedule and results ==
Date	Time	Opponent^{#}	Rank^{#}	Site	TV	Decision	Result	Attendance	Record
Regular Season
October 1	7:30 PM	at #8 Northeastern*		Matthews Arena • Boston, Massachusetts	ESPN+	Purpura	L 2–3 ^{OT}	2,579	0–1–0
October 8	5:00 PM	at Stonehill*		Bridgewater Ice Arena • Bridgewater, Massachusetts		Purpura	W 7–1	175	1–1–0
October 9	2:00 PM	at #6 Quinnipiac*		M&T Bank Arena • Hamden, Connecticut	ESPN+	Purpura	T 2–2 ^{OT}	2,731	1–1–1
October 14	7:00 PM	at Rensselaer*		Houston Field House • Troy, New York	ESPN+	Purpura	L 0–1	1,549	1–2–1
October 21	7:00 PM	at Michigan State*		Munn Ice Arena • East Lansing, Michigan	BTN+	Purpura	L 1–3	4,594	1–3–1
October 22	6:00 PM	at Michigan State*		Munn Ice Arena • East Lansing, Michigan	BTN+	Purpura	L 4–8	4,623	1–4–1
October 28	7:45 PM	Omaha*		Northwell Health Ice Center • East Meadow, New York	ESPN+	Purpura	L 1–2	738	1–5–1
October 29	7:00 PM	Omaha*		Northwell Health Ice Center • East Meadow, New York	ESPN+	Purpura	L 1–7	300	1–6–1
November 11	8:00 PM	at Wisconsin*		Kohl Center • Madison, Wisconsin	BSW+	Purpura	L 2–3	6,058	1–7–1
November 12	8:00 PM	at Wisconsin*		Kohl Center • Madison, Wisconsin	BSW	Purpura	L 3–4 ^{OT}	7,650	1–8–1
November 19	6:50 PM	at Assumption*		Worcester Ice Center • Worcester, Massachusetts		Purpura	W 5–1	208	2–8–1
November 25	7:45 PM	#12 Ohio State*		Northwell Health Ice Center • East Meadow, New York	ESPN+	Purpura	W 3–2	526	3–8–1
November 26	8:00 PM	#12 Ohio State*		Northwell Health Ice Center • East Meadow, New York	ESPN+	Purpura	L 1–4	516	3–9–1
December 3	8:00 PM	Brown*		Northwell Health Ice Center • East Meadow, New York	ESPN+	Purpura	L 1–5	300	3–10–1
December 4	7:15 PM	Brown*		Northwell Health Ice Center • East Meadow, New York	ESPN+	Perrone	W 5–4 ^{OT}	200	4–10–1
December 10	7:00 PM	Franklin Pierce*		Northwell Health Ice Center • East Meadow, New York	ESPN+	Purpura	W 6–1	516	5–10–1
December 11	7:15 PM	Franklin Pierce*		Northwell Health Ice Center • East Meadow, New York	ESPN+	Perrone	W 9–2	200	6–10–1
December 18	7:15 PM	Northeastern*		Northwell Health Ice Center • East Meadow, New York	ESPN+	Purpura	L 3–4 ^{OT}	717	6–11–1
December 29	7:00 PM	#10 Connecticut*		Northwell Health Ice Center • East Meadow, New York	ESPN+	Purpura	L 1–2 ^{OT}	707	6–12–1
December 31	1:05 PM	at #10 Connecticut*		XL Center • Hartford, Connecticut	ESPN+	Purpura	L 3–5	4,647	6–13–1
January 13	7:00 PM	at Princeton*		Hobey Baker Memorial Rink • Princeton, New Jersey	ESPN+	Purpura	L 2–5	1,300	6–14–1
January 14	7:00 PM	at #1 Quinnipiac*		M&T Bank Arena • Hamden, Connecticut	ESPN+	Purpura	L 2–5	1,100	6–15–1
January 20	3:00 PM	Lindenwood*		Northwell Health Ice Center • East Meadow, New York	ESPN+	Perrone	W 3–2 ^{OT}	422	7–15–1
January 21	8:00 PM	Lindenwood*		Northwell Health Ice Center • East Meadow, New York	ESPN+	Purpura	W 6–4	250	8–15–1
January 28	7:00 PM	at Princeton*		Hobey Baker Memorial Rink • Princeton, New Jersey	ESPN+	Perrone	W 6–4	1,817	9–15–1
February 3	3:00 PM	Stonehill*		Northwell Health Ice Center • East Meadow, New York	ESPN+	Perrone	W 9–3	210	10–15–1
February 4	2:00 PM	Stonehill*		Northwell Health Ice Center • East Meadow, New York	ESPN+	Purpura	W 9–1	337	11–15–1
February 10	3:00 PM	#20 Alaska*		Northwell Health Ice Center • East Meadow, New York	ESPN+	Purpura	L 3–5	372	11–16–1
February 11	2:00 PM	#20 Alaska*		Northwell Health Ice Center • East Meadow, New York	ESPN+	Perrone	W 3–1	230	12–16–1
February 17	11:07 PM	at Alaska*		Carlson Center • Fairbanks, Alaska	FloHockey	Perrone	L 2–3	1,912	12–17–1
February 18	11:07 PM	at Alaska*		Carlson Center • Fairbanks, Alaska	FloHockey	Purpura	L 3–6	2,817	12–18–1
February 25	2:00 PM	Alaska Anchorage*		Northwell Health Ice Center • East Meadow, New York	ESPN+	Purpura	L 0–4	500	12–19–1
February 26	7:15 PM	Alaska Anchorage*		Northwell Health Ice Center • East Meadow, New York	ESPN+	Perrone	W 6–2	456	13–19–1
February 28	3:00 PM	Alaska Anchorage*		Northwell Health Ice Center • East Meadow, New York	ESPN+	Perrone	L 3–5	300	13–20–1
March 10	10:00 PM	at Arizona State*		Mullett Arena • Tempe, Arizona		Perrone	L 3–6	4,448	13–21–1
March 11	10:00 PM	at Arizona State*		Mullett Arena • Tempe, Arizona		Purpura	L 1–2 ^{OT}	4,516	13–22–1
*Non-conference game. ^{#}Rankings from USCHO.com Poll. All times are in Eastern Time. Source:

== Scoring statistics ==
Name	Position	Games	Goals	Assists	Points	PIM
Anthony Vincent	F	36	17	20	37	78
Adam Goodsir	F	35	15	19	34	64
Cade Mason	D	26	7	25	32	8
Patriks Marcinkēvičs	LW	24	6	21	27	23
Riley Wallack	F	35	11	9	20	20
Josh Zary	F	28	12	5	17	0
Noah Kane	C	34	8	9	17	14
Austin Brimmer	RW	32	6	11	17	27
Jordan Di Cicco	D	34	6	11	17	10
Nolan Welsh	F	32	5	12	17	12
Jack Quinn	F	36	6	8	14	6
Spencer Cox	C/D	34	1	12	13	10
Isaiah Fox	F	24	9	1	10	26
Valtteri Piironen	D	32	1	9	10	26
Preston Brodziak	F	28	1	8	9	12
Chris Pappas	C	23	3	3	6	8
Austin Rook	D	33	2	4	6	10
John Gormley	D	36	1	5	6	30
Zachary Nazzarett	LW	17	1	4	5	6
Daniel Baldassarra	C	17	1	2	3	2
Santeri Hartikainen	C/RW	22	0	3	3	4
Gustav Müller	F	11	1	1	2	2
Dylan Schuett	C	16	1	1	2	10
A. J. Casperson	D	8	0	2	2	10
Brandon Perrone	G	14	0	2	2	0
Tyler Kostelecky	F	4	0	1	1	0
Xan Gurney	D	14	0	1	1	8
Jan Škorpík	G	1	0	0	0	0
Ethan Martini	D	11	0	0	0	21
Vinnie Purpura	G	26	0	0	0	0
Bench	-	-	-	-	-	0
Total			121	209	330	435

== Goaltending statistics ==
Name	Games	Minutes	Wins	Losses	Ties	Goals against	Saves	Shut outs	SV %	GAA
Brandon Perrone	14	675:02	7	3	0	32	255	0	.889	2.84
Jan Škorpík	1	20:00	0	0	0	1	7	0	.875	3.00
Vincent Purpura	26	1464:47	6	19	1	83	690	0	.893	3.40
Empty Net	-	21:12	-	-	-	7	-	-	-	-
Total	36	2181:01	13	22	1	123	952	0	.886	3.38

== Rankings ==
Poll	Week																											
Poll	Pre	1	2	3	4	5	6	7	8	9	10	11	12	13	14	15	16	17	18	19	20	21	22	23	24	25	26	27 (Final)
USCHO.com	NR	-	NR	NR	NR	NR	NR	NR	NR	NR	NR	NR	NR	-	NR	NR	NR	NR	NR	NR	NR	NR	NR	NR	NR	NR	-	NR
USA Today	NR	NR	NR	NR	NR	NR	NR	NR	NR	NR	NR	NR	NR	NR	NR	NR	NR	NR	NR	NR	NR	NR	NR	NR	NR	NR	NR	NR

Note: USCHO did not release a poll in weeks 1, 13, or 26.
