= 2022–23 Lindenwood Lions men's ice hockey season =

- Conference: Independent
- Home ice: Centene Community Ice Center

Rankings
- USCHO: NR
- USA Today: NR

Record
- Overall: 7–22–1
- Home: 3–1–0
- Road: 4–21–1

Coaches and captains
- Head coach: Rick Zombo
- Assistant coaches: Mark Abney; Gary Gardner; Jason Power
- Captain(s): Andy Willis; Aiden Yakimchuk

The 2022–23 Lindenwood Lions men's ice hockey season was the inaugural season of varsity play for the program. The Lions represented Lindenwood University and were coached by Rick Zombo, in his 13th season.

== Season ==
With nearly two years lead time into their first season, Lindenwood was able to compile a full slate of games against Division I opponents. Predictably, as the team was still populated by club team players, the Lions were one of the worst squads in the nation. However, among the poor results there were bright spots. Lindenwood got a baptism of fire by playing both Minnesota and Michigan, two prohibitive favorites for the NCAA championship, in the first two weeks of the season. While the Lions lost all four games, they did show the ability to score. Over the course of the year, Lindenwood averaged just over 3 goals per game, which was well on par with most other D-I programs.

The biggest problem for the Lions was keeping the puck out of their own net. Lindenwood allowed an average of almost 42 shots against per game, much higher than the nominal 30 shots. Their three besieges goalies were unable to handle the sheer volume of chances that were thrown in their direction with each surrendering more than 4 goals per game on average. The defensive situation didn't get any better as the season progressed but that didn't stop the Lions from winning several games in their first season.

Despite having several extended layoffs during the campaign, as well as mostly playing on the road, Lindenwood was able to win 7 games during the season. While each victory came against a team with a low national ranking, they had performed far better than other recent entries to D-I (Stonehill, St. Thomas) and would look to continue their transition to the top level of college hockey next year.

== Departures ==
Player	Position	Nationality	Cause
Coltin Craigo	Forward	United States	Graduation (retired)
Praveen Dhaliwal	Forward	Canada	Left program (retired)
Vegard Faret	Forward	Norway	Graduation (retired)
Blake Finley	Defenseman	United States	Left program (retired)
Stephen Friedland	Goaltender	United States	Left program (retired)
Max Helgeson	Forward	United States	Transferred to Alaska Anchorage
Ryan Leonard	Defenseman	United States	Left program (retired)
Zach Martin	Forward	United States	Graduation (retired)
Niki Molson	Defenseman	Canada	Left program (retired)
Brendan Murphy	Defenseman	United States	Graduation (retired)
Kyler Newman	Defenseman	Canada	Graduation (retired)
Ethan Paulin-Hatch	Goaltender	Canada	Left program (retired)
Jack Radley	Forward	United States	Graduation (retired)
Hayden Ursulak	Forward	Canada	Graduation (retired)

== Recruiting ==
Player	Position	Nationality	Age	Notes
Adisen Brueck	Forward	United States	21	Plantation, FL
Adam Conquest	Forward	United States	22	Milford, MI; transfer from Bowling Green
Cade DeStefani	Forward	United States	21	Bedford, NH
Kabore Dunn	Defenseman	Canada	20	Mill Bay, BC; transfer from Maine
Hunter Johannes	Forward	United States	18	Eden Prairie, MN; transfer from American International
Drew Kuzma	Forward	Canada	19	St. Albert, AB
Matt Ladd	Goaltender	United States	24	Getzville, NY; graduate transfer from Canisius
Shane LaVelle	Forward	United States	21	Chaska, MN
Max Neill	Forward	Canada	21	Portage la Prairie, MB
Joe Prouty	Defenseman	United States	20	Apple Valley, MN
Kieran Ruscheinski	Defenseman	Canada	21	Calgary, AB; selected 206th overall in 2019
Roni Salmenkangas	Goaltender	Finland	23	Tampere, FIN; graduate transfer from Ferris State
Coltan Wilkie	Defenseman	United States	22	Elkhorn, NE

== Roster ==
As of August 16, 2022.

No.	Nat.	Player	Class	Pos	Height	Weight	DoB	Hometown	Previous team	NHL rights
1	(United States)	Trent Burnham	Sophomore	G	6' 0" (1.83 m)	160 lb (73 kg)	2000-03-27	Eagle River, Alaska	Sioux Falls Stampede (USHL)	—
3	(Canada)	Kieran Ruscheinski	Freshman	D	6' 6" (1.98 m)	210 lb (95 kg)	2001-03-05	Calgary, Alberta	Salmon Arm Silverbacks (BCHL)	MTL, 206th overall 2019
5	(Canada)	Aiden Yakimchuk (C)	Sophomore	D	6' 4" (1.93 m)	200 lb (91 kg)	2000-05-14	St. Albert, Alberta	Drumheller Dragons (AJHL)	—
6	(United States)	Cade DeStefani	Freshman	F	6' 2" (1.88 m)	185 lb (84 kg)	2001-06-21	Bedford, New Hampshire	Janesville Jets (NAHL)	—
7	(Canada)	Drew Kuzma	Freshman	F	6' 6" (1.98 m)	210 lb (95 kg)	2002-11-13	St. Albert, Alberta	Flin Flon Bombers (SJHL)	—
8	(United States)	Kyle Jeffers	Sophomore	F	5' 10" (1.78 m)	165 lb (75 kg)	1999-01-06	Oviedo, Florida	American International (AHA)	—
9	(United States)	Andy Willis (C)	Senior	F	6' 0" (1.83 m)	185 lb (84 kg)	1998-01-22	Ballwin, Missouri	St. Thomas (MIAC)	—
10	(United States)	Mitch Allard	Sophomore	F	6' 1" (1.85 m)	205 lb (93 kg)	2000-01-27	Shelby Township, Michigan	Minnesota Wilderness (NAHL)	—
11	(United States)	Jackson Wozniak	Sophomore	F	5' 10" (1.78 m)	176 lb (80 kg)	2000-02-22	Cypress, California	Wichita Falls Warriors (NAHL)	—
12	(United States)	Mason Kruger	Junior	D	5' 8" (1.73 m)	165 lb (75 kg)	1999-02-26	Alpharetta, Georgia	St. Louis Jr. Blues (NA3HL)	—
13	(United States)	Zach Aughe	Junior	F	6' 3" (1.91 m)	205 lb (93 kg)	2000-02-18	Clarkston, Michigan	Maine (HEA)	—
14	(United States)	Coltan Wilkie	Freshman	D	5' 8" (1.73 m)	180 lb (82 kg)	2000-04-03	Gretna, Nebraska	Okotoks Oilers (AJHL)	—
15	(United States)	Joe Prouty	Freshman	D	6' 0" (1.83 m)	180 lb (82 kg)	2001-11-29	Burnsville, Minnesota	New Mexico Ice Wolves (NAHL)	—
16	(United States)	Caleb Price	Sophomore	D	5' 10" (1.78 m)	170 lb (77 kg)	2000-03-31	Hooksett, New Hampshire	New Jersey Titans (NAHL)	—
17	(United States)	Ryan Finnegan	Graduate	F	5' 9" (1.75 m)	160 lb (73 kg)	1997-05-08	Tecumseh, Kansas	Jersey Hitmen (NCDC)	—
18	(United States)	Jack Anderson	Freshman	D	6' 6" (1.98 m)	225 lb (102 kg)	2002-11-14	St. Louis, Missouri	El Paso Rhinos (NAHL)	—
19	(Canada)	Caige Sterzer	Sophomore	F	6' 5" (1.96 m)	215 lb (98 kg)	2000-08-08	Kimberley, British Columbia	Lone Star Brahmas (NAHL)	—
21	(United States)	Hunter Johannes	Junior	F	6' 3" (1.91 m)	210 lb (95 kg)	1998-07-24	Eden Prairie, Minnesota	American International (AHA)	—
22	(Canada)	Max Neill	Freshman	F	6' 1" (1.85 m)	185 lb (84 kg)	2001-01-31	Portage la Prairie, Manitoba	Minnesota Wilderness (NAHL)	—
23	(United States)	Shane LaVelle	Freshman	F	6' 1" (1.85 m)	185 lb (84 kg)	2001-08-16	Chaska, Minnesota	Cowichan Valley Capitals (BCHL)	—
24	(United States)	Adam Conquest	Senior	F	6' 0" (1.83 m)	190 lb (86 kg)	2000-05-10	Brighton, Michigan	Bowling Green (CCHA)	—
25	(United States)	Sam Watson	Junior	F	6' 1" (1.85 m)	185 lb (84 kg)	2000-08-24	St. Peters, Missouri	Burlington Cougars (OJHL)	—
26	(United States)	Adisen Brueck	Freshman	F	5' 11" (1.8 m)	185 lb (84 kg)	2001-08-27	St. Louis, Missouri	Wichita Falls Warriors (NAHL)	—
27	(Canada)	David Gagnon	Sophomore	F	6' 1" (1.85 m)	190 lb (86 kg)	2000-04-19	Halifax, Nova Scotia	Truro Bearcats (MHL)	—
28	(Canada)	Kabore Dunn	Freshman	D	6' 2" (1.88 m)	185 lb (84 kg)	2001-11-10	Mill Bay, British Columbia	Trail Smoke Eaters (BCHL)	—
30	(Finland)	Roni Salmenkangas	Graduate	G	6' 0" (1.83 m)	177 lb (80 kg)	1999-03-28	Tampere, Finland	Ferris State (CCHA)	—
31	(United States)	Matt Ladd	Graduate	G	6' 3" (1.91 m)	200 lb (91 kg)	1998-07-11	Getzville, New York	Canisius (AHA)	—

== Standings ==
2022–23 NCAA Division I Independent ice hockey standings
	Overall record					
	GP	W	L	T	GF	GA
#15 Alaska	34	22	10	2	104	74
Alaska Anchorage	28	8	19	1	66	106
Arizona State	39	18	21	0	115	112
Lindenwood	30	7	22	1	92	134
Long Island	36	13	22	1	116	123
Stonehill	25	17	6	2	102	95
Rankings: USCHO.com Top 20 Poll

== Schedule and results ==
Date	Time	Opponent^{#}	Rank^{#}	Site	TV	Decision	Result	Attendance	Record
Regular Season
October 1	7:00 PM	at #2 Minnesota*		3M Arena at Mariucci • Minneapolis, Minnesota	BSN+	Burnham	L 0–4	6,867	0–1–0
October 2	7:00 PM	at #2 Minnesota*		3M Arena at Mariucci • Minneapolis, Minnesota	BSN+	Ladd	L 4–6	5,985	0–2–0
October 7	6:00 PM	at #7 Michigan*		Yost Ice Arena • Ann Arbor, Michigan	BTN+	Burnham	L 4–7	5,062	0–3–0
October 8	6:00 PM	at #7 Michigan*		Yost Ice Arena • Ann Arbor, Michigan	BTN+	Salmenkangas	L 1–3	5,371	0–4–0
October 14	7:10 PM	Air Force*		Centene Community Ice Center • St. Charles, Missouri		Burnham	W 7–6	2,065	1–4–0
October 15	2:10 PM	Air Force*		Centene Community Ice Center • St. Charles, Missouri		Ladd	L 3–5	1,073	1–5–0
October 22	6:05 PM	at American International*		MassMutual Center • Springfield, Massachusetts	FloHockey	Salmenkangas	L 0–5	343	1–6–0
October 23	2:05 PM	at American International*		MassMutual Center • Springfield, Massachusetts	FloHockey	Ladd	L 3–5	146	1–7–0
October 28	6:05 PM	at Bentley*		Bentley Arena • Waltham, Massachusetts	FloHockey	Burnham	W 7–3	1,405	2–7–0
October 29	3:05 PM	at Bentley*		Bentley Arena • Waltham, Massachusetts	FloHockey	Burnham	L 1–3	1,205	2–8–0
November 4	6:00 PM	at Army*		Tate Rink • West Point, New York	FloHockey	Burnham	W 2–1	1,133	3–8–0
November 5	3:00 PM	at Army*		Tate Rink • West Point, New York	FloHockey	Salmenkangas	W 5–3	1,214	4–8–0
November 18	7:00 PM	at Wisconsin*		Kohl Center • Madison, Wisconsin	BSW+	Burnham	L 3–4	5,550	4–9–0
November 19	7:00 PM	at Wisconsin*		Kohl Center • Madison, Wisconsin	BSW	Ladd	L 1–5	6,974	4–10–0
December 16	8:00 PM	at #1 Denver*		Magness Arena • Denver, Colorado	Altitude 2	Salmenkangas	L 0–5	4,944	4–11–0
December 17	7:00 PM	at #1 Denver*		Magness Arena • Denver, Colorado		Burnham	L 4–5	5,268	4–12–0
December 30	6:00 PM	at Vermont*		Gutterson Fieldhouse • Burlington, Vermont	ESPN+	Ladd	L 2–4	2,343	4–13–0
December 31	3:00 PM	at Vermont*		Gutterson Fieldhouse • Burlington, Vermont	ESPN+	Burnham	W 3–2 ^{OT}	2,057	5–13–0
January 6	7:07 PM	at North Dakota*		Ralph Engelstad Arena • Grand Forks, North Dakota	Midco	Burnham	L 3–4	10,354	5–14–0
January 7	6:07 PM	at North Dakota*		Ralph Engelstad Arena • Grand Forks, North Dakota	Midco	Burnham	L 2–4	11,616	5–15–0
January 20	2:00 PM	at Long Island*		Northwell Health Ice Center • East Meadow, New York	ESPN+	Salmenkangas	L 2–3 ^{OT}	422	5–16–0
January 21	8:00 PM	at Long Island*		Northwell Health Ice Center • East Meadow, New York	ESPN+	Ladd	L 4–6	250	5–17–0
February 10	7:10 PM	Stonehill*		Centene Community Ice Center • St. Charles, Missouri		Burnham	W 5–2	2,008	6–17–0
February 11	4:10 PM	Stonehill*		Centene Community Ice Center • St. Charles, Missouri		Ladd	W 10–3	1,163	7–17–0
February 17	9:00 PM	at Arizona State*		Mullett Arena • Tempe, Arizona		Burnham	L 2–8	4,670	7–18–0
February 18	9:00 PM	at Arizona State*		Mullett Arena • Tempe, Arizona		Salmenkangas	L 3–5	5,045	7–19–0
February 24	6:00 PM	USNTDP*		Centene Community Ice Center • St. Charles, Missouri (Exhibition)			L 4–12	-	
February 25	6:00 PM	USNTDP*		Centene Community Ice Center • St. Charles, Missouri (Exhibition)		Burnam	L 1–6	-	
March 3	10:07 PM	at #18 Alaska*		Carlson Center • Fairbanks, Alaska	FloHockey	Burnham	L 1–4	2,417	7–20–0
March 4	10:07 PM	at #18 Alaska*		Carlson Center • Fairbanks, Alaska	FloHockey	Salmenkangas	L 0–8	3,562	7–21–0
March 10	10:07 PM	at Alaska Anchorage*		Seawolf Sports Complex • Anchorage, Alaska		Burnham	T 7–7 ^{OT}	455	7–21–1
March 11	9:07 PM	at Alaska Anchorage*		Seawolf Sports Complex • Anchorage, Alaska		Burnham	L 3–4 ^{OT}	475	7–22–1
*Non-conference game. ^{#}Rankings from USCHO.com Poll. All times are in Central Time. Source:

== Scoring statistics ==
Name	Position	Games	Goals	Assists	Points	PIM
David Gagnon	LW	30	13	17	30	16
Hunter Johannes	F	28	13	16	29	87
Andy Willis	F	26	8	15	23	12
Kyle Jeffers	F	28	7	13	20	26
Ryan Finnegan	F	29	6	14	20	6
Cade DeStefani	C	26	7	8	15	42
Adam Conquest	RW	22	6	6	12	6
Aiden Yakimchuk	D	30	2	10	12	8
Caige Sterzer	F	26	6	5	11	48
Joe Prouty	D	30	2	9	11	36
Caleb Price	D	30	3	7	10	12
Mitch Allard	LW	30	3	7	10	48
Jack Anderson	D	30	2	8	10	23
Kabore Dunn	D	23	2	6	8	14
Drew Kuzma	F	30	2	5	7	28
Coltan Wilkie	D	26	1	6	7	12
Zachary Aughe	C	26	5	1	6	19
Shane Lavell	F	25	2	3	5	23
Kieran Ruscheinski	D	29	1	2	3	20
Max Neill	LW	19	1	1	2	17
Jackson Wozniak	F	9	0	1	1	4
Sam Watson	F	12	0	1	1	4
Mason Kruger	D	1	0	0	0	0
Adisen Brueck	F	2	0	0	0	0
Matt Ladd	G	7	0	0	0	0
Roni Salmenkangas	G	8	0	0	0	6
Trent Burnham	G	16	0	0	0	0
Total			92	161	253	517

== Goaltending statistics ==
Name	Games	Minutes	Wins	Losses	Ties	Goals Against	Saves	Shut Outs	SV %	GAA
Trent Burnham	16	946:02	5	10	1	67	610	0	.901	4.25
Roni Salmenkangas	8	438:33	1	6	0	32	269	0	.894	4.38
Matt Ladd	7	417:54	1	6	0	33	238	0	.878	4.74
Empty Net	-	12:21	-	-	-	2	-	-	-	-
Total	30	1812:50	7	22	1	134	1117	0	.893	4.44

== Rankings ==
Poll	Week																											
Poll	Pre	1	2	3	4	5	6	7	8	9	10	11	12	13	14	15	16	17	18	19	20	21	22	23	24	25	26	27 (Final)
USCHO.com	NR	-	NR	NR	NR	NR	NR	NR	NR	NR	NR	NR	NR	-	NR	NR	NR	NR	NR	NR	NR	NR	NR	NR	NR	NR	-	NR
USA Today	NR	NR	NR	NR	NR	NR	NR	NR	NR	NR	NR	NR	NR	NR	NR	NR	NR	NR	NR	NR	NR	NR	NR	NR	NR	NR	NR	NR

Note: USCHO did not release a poll in weeks 1, 13, or 26.
