= Matt Shasby =

American ice hockey player and coach

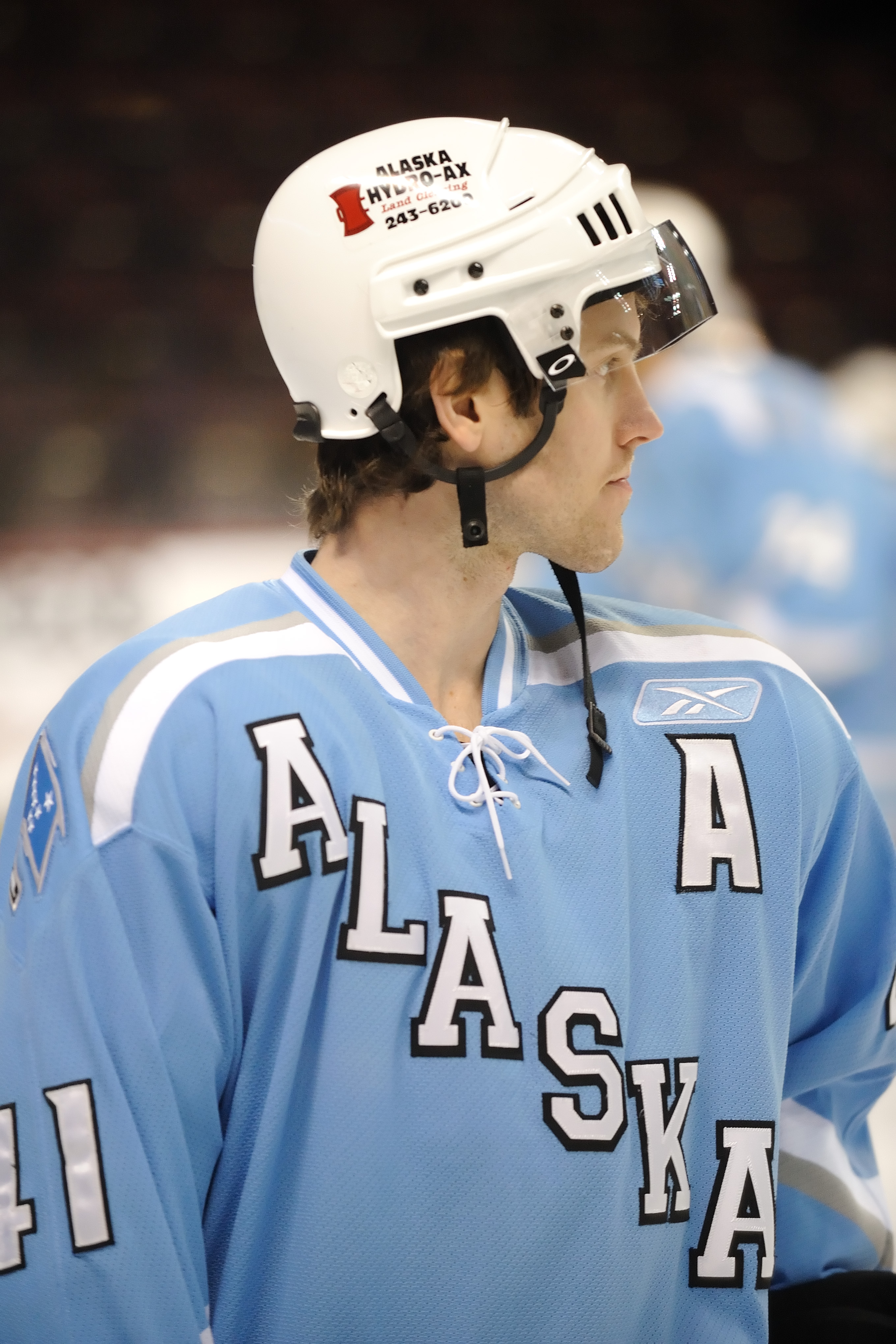
- Shasby in 2009 with the Alaska Aces
- Born: July 2, 1980 (age 46) Eagle River, Alaska, USA
- Height: 6 ft 2 in (188 cm)
- Weight: 200 lb (91 kg; 14 st 4 lb)
- Position: Defenseman
- Shoots: Left
- NHL draft: 150th overall, 1999; Montreal Canadiens Coaching career

Current position
- Title: Head coach
- Team: Alaska Anchorage
- Conference: Independent

Biographical details
- Education: University of Alaska Anchorage

Playing career
- 1997–1999: Lincoln Stars
- 1998–1999: Des Moines Buccaneers
- 1999–2003: Alaska Anchorage
- 2003–2004: Columbus Cottonmouths
- 2004–2005: Hamilton Bulldogs
- 2004–2005: Long Beach Ice Dogs
- 2005–2009: Alaska Aces
- 2011–2012: Alaska Aces
- Position: Defenseman

Coaching career (HC unless noted)
- 2021–present: Alaska Anchorage

Head coaching record
- Overall: 34–86–9 (.298)

Matthew Shasby (born July 2, 1980) is an American ice hockey coach and former player who is currently in charge of the program at Alaska Anchorage.

== Career ==
An Alaska native, Shasby travelled south to finish out his junior hockey career and played two years in the USHL. He performed well enough to be selected by the Montreal Canadiens in the 1999 NHL entry draft. The following fall he returned to Alaska to play college hockey at Alaska Anchorage. While the Seawolves had a decent season during his freshman year, they finished near the bottom of the WCHA standings in 2001. After a new coach was introduced and Shasby was named an alternate captain, the Seawolves rebounded with a solid season. Shasby was named team captain in his senior season but the team went on to produce a horrible season. Alaska Anchorage won just a single game and finished with the worst record in program history. On top of the on-ice woes, 13 players were suspended for improperly using scholarship money for textbooks. Shasby, along with 10 other players, received 3-game suspensions.

After graduating, Shasby signed a professional contract and joined the Columbus Cottonmouths, the ECHL-affiliate of the Canadiens. He led the team in scoring by a defenseman and helped them finish with a winning record after a difficult start to the season. He was promoted to the AHL for the next year but went scoreless in 11 games with the Hamilton Bulldogs. He rediscovered his scoring touch with in the ECHL and helped the Long Beach Ice Dogs reach the second round of the playoffs.

Shasby left Montreal's system in 2005 and signed on with the Alaska Aces. He arrived just in time to help the Aces win the franchise's first ever championship. He played four years with the team and put up tremendous offensive numbers. Additionally, Shasby served as team captain for the 2008 season. He helped the Aces return to the finals in 2009 but the team fell to the South Carolina Stingrays in seven games. After the postseason, Shasby announced his retirement and began his coaching career. Three years later, he was brought out of retirement for a single game with the Aces and scored a goal in his final professional appearance.

Shasby remained in Alaska and coached several age groups and high school teams over many years. He rose through the ranks and became the vice president of player development for the state of Alaska. When Alaska Anchorage successfully raised enough money to restart their ice hockey program, they turned to Shasby as the team's head coach.

== Career statistics ==
=== Regular season and playoffs ===
			Regular season					Playoffs
Season	Team	League	GP	G	A	Pts	PIM	GP	G	A	Pts	PIM
1997–98	Lincoln Stars	USHL	48	1	15	16	30	8	0	0	0	2
1997–98	Lincoln Stars	USHL	17	1	4	5	10	—	—	—	—	—
1997–98	Des Moines Buccaneers	USHL	32	3	18	21	24	11	0	1	1	12
1999–00	Alaska Anchorage	WCHA	32	1	8	9	36	—	—	—	—	—
2000–01	Alaska Anchorage	WCHA	35	4	14	18	32	—	—	—	—	—
2001–02	Alaska Anchorage	WCHA	35	7	20	27	72	—	—	—	—	—
2002–03	Alaska Anchorage	WCHA	25	0	11	11	18	—	—	—	—	—
2003–04	Columbus Cottonmouths	ECHL	66	8	20	28	34	—	—	—	—	—
2004–05	Hamilton Bulldogs	AHL	11	0	0	0	0	—	—	—	—	—
2004–05	Long Beach Ice Dogs	ECHL	40	4	18	22	52	4	0	0	0	2
2005–06	Alaska Aces	ECHL	67	7	33	40	87	22	4	6	10	8
2006–07	Alaska Aces	ECHL	66	10	45	55	109	15	1	6	7	12
2007–08	Alaska Aces	ECHL	56	9	31	40	66	8	3	3	6	8
2008–09	Alaska Aces	ECHL	68	7	39	46	60	20	2	6	8	22
2011–12	Alaska Aces	ECHL	1	1	0	1	0	—	—	—	—	—
USHL totals			97	5	37	42	64	19	0	1	1	14
NCAA totals			127	12	53	65	158	—	—	—	—	—
ECHL totals			364	46	186	232	408	69	10	22	32	52

== College Head coaching record ==
Record table
Season	Team	Overall	Conference	Standing	Postseason
Alaska Anchorage Seawolves (NCAA Division I independent) (2022–present)
2022–23	Alaska Anchorage	8–19–1			
2023–24	Alaska Anchorage	15–17–2			
2024–25	Alaska Anchorage	6–23–5			
2025–26	Alaska Anchorage	5–27–1			UCHC Consolation Semifinal
Alaska Anchorage:		34–86–9			
Total:		34–86–9			
National champion Postseason invitational champion Conference regular season champion Conference regular season and conference tournament champion Division regular season champion Division regular season and conference tournament champion Conference tournament champion

== Awards and honors ==
Award	Year
Kelly Cup Champion	2005–06
Reebok Hockey Plus Performer Award	2006–07
ECHL All-Star Game	2008–09
All-ECHL Second Team	2008–09
