= El Paso Rhinos (NAHL) =

- City: El Paso, Texas
- League: North American Hockey League
- Division: South
- Founded: 2021
- Home arena: County Events Center
- Colors: Orange, black, gray, white
- Owner(s): Cory Herman
- President: Corey Heon
- Head coach: Joe Coombs
- Asst. coach: Josh Brown
- Affiliate: El Paso Rhinos
- Website: http://www.elpasorhinos.com

Franchise history
- 2021–present: El Paso Rhinos

The El Paso Rhinos are a junior ice hockey organization based in El Paso, Texas. They play their home games at the County Events Center located within the El Paso County Coliseum complex. The Rhinos are members of the Tier II junior North American Hockey League (NAHL).

== History ==
In 2020, due to the demise of the Western States Hockey League, the EL Paso Rhinos announced that they were joining the North American 3 Hockey League (NA3HL) as an expansion team for the upcoming season. At the same time, their new league's parent organization, the North American Hockey League (NAHL) also approved the addition of the El Paso Rhinos as an expansion franchise. While the original club would continue in the NA3HL, a separate Tier II team of the same name would begin play in 2021.

For their inaugural season, Cory Herman was slated to be the head coach of the Tier II club however, after 15 years behind the bench, Herman stepped down to focus on team operations and hired Anthony Bohn as head coach of the NAHL team in the summer of 2021.

== Season-by-season records ==
Season	GP	W	L	OTL	PTS	GF	GA	PIM	Finish	Playoffs
2021–22	60	15	41	4	34	131	233	1255	8th of 8, South; 27th of 29, NAHL	Did not qualify
2022–23	60	18	38	4	40	111	201	1000	7th of 8, South; 27th of 29, NAHL	Did not qualify
2023–24	60	38	16	6	82	180	146	1190	3rd of 9, South; 8th of 32, NAHL	Won Div. Play-In series, 2–1 vs. Oklahoma Warriors; Lost Div. Semifinal series, 2–3, vs. Shreveport Mudbugs
2024–25	59	29	26	4	62	168	183	1342	5th of 9, South; 20th of 35, NAHL	Lost Div. Play-Inn series, 1–2 vs. New Mexico Ice Wolves
