= Fairbanks Ice Dogs =

Professional ice hockey team in Fairbanks, Alaska, United States

- City: Fairbanks, Alaska
- League: North American Hockey League
- Division: Midwest
- Founded: 1997 (In the WSHL)
- Home arena: Big Dipper Ice Arena
- Colors: White, Grey, maroon, and sky blue
- General manager: Rob Proffitt
- Head coach: Ryan Theros 2023

Franchise history
- 1997–present: Fairbanks Ice Dogs

Championships
- Regular season titles: NAHL: 2015–16, 2017–18, 2018–2019, 2021–2022
- Division titles: WSHL Northern: 1997–98, 1998–99; NorPac: 2000–01; NAHL West: 2008–09, 2010–11, 2011–12, 2013–14, 2014–15; NAHL Midwest: 2015–16
- Playoff championships: Alaska Airlines Club 49 Cup: 2021–22 Cascade Cup: 2000–01 Robertson Cup: 2010–11, 2013–14, 2015–16

The Fairbanks Ice Dogs are a Tier II junior ice hockey team in the North American Hockey League's Midwest Division. The Ice Dogs play home games at the 2,200-seat Big Dipper Ice Arena in Fairbanks, Alaska.

== History ==
Originally started in 1997 in the Tier III Junior B Western States Hockey League (WSHL) as a hockey program to replace the Alaska Gold Kings and give Alaskan players a chance to play after they finished high school and/or midgets. The Ice Dogs won the Northern Division its inaugural season, but lost to the Southern champs the following year in exhibition games. In 1998–99 season, they again won the Northern Division but lost to the Southern Division champions, the Ventura Mariners.

In 2000, the Ice Dogs became a member of the Tier III Junior B Northern Pacific Hockey League (NorPac) and also played sixteen games in the Tier III Junior A America West Hockey League (AWHL) to help fill out their schedule in the 2000–01 season. The team would go on to win the NorPac championship in that season before leaving for the higher level AWHL full-time for the 2001–02 season.

The Ice Dogs were named the 2001–02 AWHL Organization of the Year in their first full Junior A season. The team moved to the NAHL in the AWHL-NAHL merger that took place in 2003. The Ice Dogs were upset in the West Division Finals in the 2008–09 season after winning the West Division regular season title. The Ice Dogs lost in the 2010 Robertson Cup final to the Bismarck Bobcats 3–0. The following season the Ice Dogs won the Robertson Cup for the first time in a come from behind win over the Michigan Warriors 4–2. In the 2013–14 season, the Ice Dogs once more won the West Division regular season title (fourth time in six years) and proceeded to win the Robertson Cup for the second time.

The Ice Dogs had continued success, leading their division in four of the next five seasons and winning a third Robertson Cup in 2016. They were again the division leaders when the 2019–20 season was cancelled midseason due to the COVID-19 pandemic. Due to travel restrictions in the state of Alaska and the rest of the United States during the pandemic, the Ice Dogs temporarily relocated to Marshall, Minnesota, for most of the 2020–21 season before returning to Alaska in mid-April 2021.

During the 2021–22 season, longtime head coach Trevor Stewert resigned to pursue an associate head coach position in the NCAA Division I and was replaced by former NHL player Dave Allison.

== 25 year playoff streak ==
Starting from before the Ice Dogs joined the NAHL, when they were in the AWHL, the Ice Dogs were in the playoffs every year from 1997-2022. That included 3 Robinson Cup(the NAHL's version of the playoffs) Championships in 2010, 2013, and 2015. However, the Streak finally ended on April 8, 2023, when the Ice Dogs hosted the Chippewa Steel. All Chippewa needed was a win that weekend and they would be in. The Ice Dogs did take game 1 the night before(3-0), but they needed to keep winning to keep the playoff streak alive. Which did not happen as the Steel beat the Ice Dogs 4-1 to take the final remaining playoff spot and slam the door on not only the Ice Dogs playoff hopes, but their neighbor, the Anchorage Wolverines playoff hopes as well.

== Season-by-season records ==
Season	GP	W	L	OTL	PTS	GF	GA	Finish	Playoffs
Western States Hockey League
1997–98	36	29	6	1	59	229	119	1st of 4, North; 3rd of 12, WSHL	Information missing
1998–99	32	31	0	1	63	216	75	1st of 5, North; 1st of 13, WSHL	Won Div. Semifinals series, 2–0 (Peninsula Chinooks); Won Div. Final series, 2–0 (Sinbad Sailors); Lost Championship, ? (Ventura Mariners)
1999–2000	58	30	22	6	66	240	214	1st of 5, North; 2nd of 12, WSHL	Won Div. Semifinals series, 3–0 (Peninsula Chinooks); Won Div. Final series, 3–1 (Sinbad Sailors); Lost Championship, ? (Ventura Mariners)
America West Hockey League
2000–01	16	0	16	0	0	33	89	9th of 9, AWHL	Information missing
2001–02	56	28	17	11	67	216	196	4th of 9, AWHL	Information missing
2002–03	56	29	19	8	66	247	207	3rd of 7, North; 5th of 11, AWHL	Information missing
North American Hockey League
2003–04	56	31	15	10	72	174	140	2nd of 7, South t-4th of 21, NAHL	Won Div. Semifinals series, 3–1 (Wichita Falls Wildcats); Lost Div. Final series, 0–3 (Texas Tornado); Lost Round-Robin Semifinal, 2–5 (Springfield Jr. Blues), 2–3 (Bismarck Bobcats), 1–2 (Texas Tornado); Lost Third Place Game, 3–5 (Springfield Jr. Blues)
2004–05	56	26	24	6	58	164	179	4th of 6, North t-13th of 19, NAHL	Lost Div. Semifinals series, 0–3 (USNTDP)
2005–06	58	30	18	10	70	173	175	2nd of 5, West; 9th of 20, NAHL	Won Div. Semifinals series, 3–2 (Wasilla Spirit); Lost Div. Final series, 1–4 (Bozeman IceDogs)
2006–07	62	34	24	4	72	223	203	4th of 6, South; 8th of 17, NAHL	Lost Div. Semifinals series, 0–3 (St. Louis Bandits)
2007–08	58	39	15	4	82	183	129	2nd of 6, South; 3rd of 18, NAHL	Won Div. Semifinals series, 3–1 (Wichita Falls Wildcats); Lost Div. Final series, 2–3 (Topeka RoadRunners)
2008–09	59	39	12	8	84	226	152	1st of 4, West; 4th of 19, NAHL	Won Div. Semifinals series, 3–0 (Kenai River Brown Bears); Lost Div. Final series, 1–3 (Wenatchee Wild)
2009–10	58	32	22	4	68	203	182	3rd of 4, West t-8th of 19, NAHL	Won Div. Semifinals series, 3–0 (Alaska Avalanche); Lost Div. Final series, 0–3 (Wenatchee Wild); Won Round-Robin Semifinal, 4–3 (Bismarck Bobcats), 1–2 (Traverse City North Stars), 4–3 (St. Louis Bandits), 3–2 (Wenatchee Wild); Lost Robertson Cup Championship, 0–3 (Bismarck Bobcats)
2010–11	58	40	15	3	83	245	167	1st of 6, West; 3rd of 26, NAHL	Won Div. Semifinals series, 3–0 (Kenai River Brown Bears); Won Div. Final series, 3–1 (Wenatchee Wild); Won Round-Robin Semifinal, 4–3 (Topeka Roadrunners), 2–1 (Amarillo Bulls), 4–2 (Michigan Warriors); Won Robertson Cup Championship, 4–2 (Michigan Warriors)
2011–12	60	39	13	8	86	225	163	1st of 6, West; 4th of 28, NAHL	Won Div. Semifinals series, 3–0 (Kenai River Brown Bears); Won Div. Final series, 3–0 (Wenatchee Wild); Won Round-Robin Quarterfinal, 1–3 (St. Louis Bandits), 4–3 (Port Huron Fighting Falcons), 3–1 (Amarillo Bulls); Lost Robertson Cup Semifinal, 3–4 (OT) (Texas Tornado)
2012–13	60	39	17	4	82	192	148	2nd of 4, West; 6th of 24, NAHL	Won Div. Semifinals series, 3–2 (Kenai River Brown Bears); Lost Div. Final series, 2–3 (Wenatchee Wild)
2013–14	60	45	14	1	91	215	136	1st of 6, Midwest; 1st of 24, NAHL	Won Div. Semifinals series, 3–2 (Kenai River Brown Bears); Won Div. Final series, 3–2 (Wenatchee Wild); Won Robertson Cup Semifinal series, 2–0 (Michigan Warriors); Won Robertson Cup Championship series, 2–0 (Austin Bruins)
2014–15	60	40	16	4	84	238	167	t-1st of 5, Midwest t-4th of 24, NAHL	Won Div. Semifinals series, 3–0 (Minnesota Magicians); Lost Div. Final series, 0–3 (Minnesota Wilderness)
2015–16	60	49	8	3	101	251	116	1st of 6, Midwest; 1st of 22, NAHL	Won Div. Semifinals series, 3–1 (Coulee Region Chill); Won Div. Final series, 3–2 (Minnesota Wilderness); Won Robertson Cup Semifinal series, 2–0 (Aston Rebels); Won Robertson Cup Championship, 2–0 (Wichita Falls Wildcats)
2016–17	60	33	24	3	69	185	165	t-2nd of 5, Midwest t-10th of 24, NAHL	Won Div. Semifinals series, 3–0 (Minnesota Magicians); Lost Div. Final series, 1–3 (Janesville Jets)
2017–18	60	45	8	7	97	223	125	1st of 6, Midwest; 1st of 23, NAHL	Won Div. Semifinals series, 3–0 (Minnesota Magicians); Won Div. Final series, 3–2 (Janesville Jets); Lost Robertson Cup Semifinal series, 1–2 (Minot Minotauros)
2018–19	60	37	16	7	81	204	138	1st of 6, Midwest; 4th of 24, NAHL	Won Div. Semifinals series, 3–0 (Janesville Jets); Lost Div. Final series, 3–0 (Minnesota Magicians); Won Robertson Cup Semifinal series, 2–1 (Johnstown Tomahawks); Lost Robertson Cup Championship, 1–2 (Aberdeen Wings)
2019–20	52	38	11	3	79	197	111	1st of 6, Midwest; 3rd of 26, NAHL	Postseason cancelled
2020–21	48	25	19	4	54	165	163	2nd of 5, Midwest; 12th of 23, NAHL	Lost Div. Semifinals series, 0–3 (Minnesota Magicians)
2021–22	60	37	20	3	77	238	179	1st of 8, Midwest; 6th of 29, NAHL	Lost Div. Semifinals series, 0–3 (Minnesota Wilderness)
2022–23	60	28	25	7	63	181	196	6th of 8, Midwest; 22nd of 29, NAHL	Did not qualify
2023–24	60	22	30	8	52	158	211	6th of 8 Midwest; 25 of 32, NAHL	Did not qualify
2024–25	59	37	16	6	80	209	150	2nd of 8, Midwest; 7th of 35, NAHL	Lost Div. Semifinals series, 0–3 (Anchorage Wolverines)
2025–26	59	35	21	3	73	210	157	2nd of 8 Midwest; 9 of 34, NAHL	Lost Div. Semifinals series, 2–3 (Wisconsin Windigo)
