= New Jersey Titans (NAHL) =

- City: Middletown Township, New Jersey
- League: NAHL
- Division: East
- Founded: 2005
- Home arena: Middletown Ice World
- Colors: Red, black and white
- General manager: Craig Doremus (2016–17)
- Head coach: George Haviland
- Affiliates: New Jersey Titans (NA3HL)
- Website: njtitansnahl.com

Franchise history
- 2005–2012: Traverse City North Stars
- 2012–2015: Soo Eagles
- 2015–present: New Jersey Titans

Championships
- Regular season titles: 0
- Division titles: 2 (2019–20, 2021-22)
- Robertson Cups: 1 (2021–22)

The New Jersey Titans are a Tier II junior ice hockey team in the North American Hockey League. Based in Middletown Township, New Jersey, the Titans play home games at the Middletown Ice World.

== History ==
Before the franchise's move to Middletown, the NAHL franchise played from 2005 to 2012 in Traverse City, Michigan, as the Traverse City North Stars, and from 2012 to 2015 in Sault Ste. Marie, Michigan, as the Soo Eagles. Before purchasing the NAHL franchise, the Titans' junior hockey organization had previously fielded a Tier III junior hockey team in the Eastern Hockey League from 2012 to 2015. They also had a team in the Tier III (formerly Tier III Junior B) Metropolitan Junior Hockey League until 2016. The organization re-added a Tier III team in 2020 when it bought the New England Stars franchise in the North American 3 Hockey League (NA3HL).

The team originated in Espanola, Ontario, and was initially called the Espanola Eagles.

The Titans won their first title in franchise history, winning the 2021–22 NAHL Robertson Cup National Championship.

== Season-by-season records ==
Season	GP	W	L	OTL	PTS	GF	GA	PIM	Finish	Playoffs
2015–16	60	34	22	4	72	187	156	1308	2nd of 4, East Div. 9th of 22, NAHL	Lost Div. Semifinals, 0–3 vs. Johnstown Tomahawks
2016–17	60	34	22	4	72	225	190	1286	3rd of 5, East Div. 8th of 24, NAHL	Won Div. Semifinals, 3–0 vs. Johnstown Tomahawks; Lost Div. Finals, 2–3 vs. Aston Rebels
2017–18	60	29	22	9	67	203	183	1286	2nd of 5, East Div. 11th of 23, NAHL	Lost Div. Semifinals, 2–3 vs. Wilkes-Barre/Scranton Knights
2018–19	60	31	26	3	65	184	190	1077	3rd of 6, East Div. 13th of 24, NAHL	Won Div. Semifinals, 3–2 vs. Jamestown Rebels; Lost Div. Finals, 2–3 vs. Johnstown Tomahawks
2019–20	52	38	13	1	77	240	172	781	1st of 7, East Div. 4th of 26, NAHL	Season cancelled
2020–21	54	27	20	7	61	197	174	959	3rd of 6, East Div. 10th of 23, NAHL	Lost Div. Semifinals, 2–3 vs. Maine Nordiques
2021–22	60	41	16	3	85	225	163	1188	1st of 7, East Div. 2nd of 29, NAHL	Won Div. Semifinals, 3–2 vs. Northeast Generals; Won Div. Finals 3–1 Jamestown Rebels; Won League Semifinals 1–2 New Mexico Ice Wolves; Won Championship, 3–0 Anchorage Wolverines
2022–23	60	38	18	4	80	212	167	1400	2nd of 7, East Div. 6th of 29, NAHL	lost Div. Semifinals, 0–3 vs. Maine Nordiques
2023–24	60	35	22	3	73	224	180	1081	5th of 9, East Div. 12th of 32 NAHL	Won Div. Play-In, 2–0 Johnstown Tomahawks lost Div. Semifinals, 0–3 Maryland Black Bears
2024–25	59	32	20	7	71	195	194	1178	4th of 10, East Div. 14th of 35 NAHL	Lost Div. Play-In, 0–2 Johnstown Tomahawks
2025–26	59	32	22	5	69	176	174	989	3rd of 9, East Div. 13th of 34 NAHL	Lost Div. Play-In, 0-2 Danbury Jr. Hat Tricks
