= New Mexico Ice Wolves (NA3HL) =

- City: Albuquerque, New Mexico
- League: North American 3 Hockey League
- Division: South
- Founded: 1998
- Home arena: Outpost Ice Arenas
- Colors: Yellow, red, turquoise
- Owners: Desert Ice Investment, LLC
- Affiliates: New Mexico Ice Wolves

Franchise history
- 1998–2014: Flint Jr. Generals
- 2014–2018: La Crosse Freeze
- 2018–2020: Coulee Region Chill
- 2020–2021: Oklahoma City Jr. Blazers
- 2021–2022: Oklahoma City Ice Hawks
- 2022–present: New Mexico Ice Wolves

The New Mexico Ice Wolves are a Tier III junior ice hockey team in the North American 3 Hockey League. The Wolves play their home games in the Outpost Ice Arenas in Albuquerque, New Mexico.

== History ==
After the completion of the 2021-22 season, it was announced that the North American Hockey League's Wichita Falls Warriors would be relocating to Oklahoma City and the Blazers Ice Centre, beginning play as the Oklahoma Warriors in the 2022-23 season. Following this announcement, the New Mexico Ice Wolves secured the rights to an NA3HL franchise, and later confirmed the purchase of the Oklahoma City Ice Hawks. the franchise moved to Albuquerque and took the same name as their new parent club.

== Season-by-season records ==
Season	GP	W	L	OTL	SOL	Pts	GF	GA	Finish	Playoffs
2022–23	47	27	18	2	0	56	197	122	4th of 8, South; 15 of 34, NA3HL	Won Div. Semifinal series, 2–1 (Texas RoadRunners); Lost Div. Final series, 0–2 (Texas Jr. Brahmas)
2023–24	47	38	7	2	0	78	206	70	1st of 8, South; 4th of 34, NA3HL	Won Div. Semifinal series, 2–0 (Texas Jr. Brahmas); Lost Div. Final series, 1–2 (Louisiana Drillers)
2024–25	47	37	6	2	2	78	245	97	2nd of 8, South; 3rd of 35, NA3HL	Won Div. Semifinal series, 2–0 (Texas Jr. Brahmas); Lost Div. Final series, 0–2 (Louisiana Drillers); Won Round Robin, 4-3 (OT) (West Bend Power), 4-2 (Helena Bighorns); Lost Semifinal, 4-5 (Louisiana Drllers)
2025–26	44	27	13	1	3	58	180	144	3rd of 6, South; 12th of 38, NA3HL	Lost Div. Semifinal series, 1-2 (Texas Jr. Brahmas)
