= Pueblo Peppers =

- City: Pueblo, Colorado
- League: North American Hockey League
- Division: Mountain
- Founded: 2005
- Home arena: Pueblo Ice Arena & Events Center
- Colors: Burgundy, Red, Gold
- Owners: Kelly Kasik; Geoffrey Stahl
- General manager: Vinny Bohn
- Head coach: Chris Wilhite

Franchise history
- 2005–2010: North Iowa Outlaws
- 2010–2018: Coulee Region Chill
- 2018–2026: Chippewa Steel
- 2026–Present: Pueblo Peppers

The Pueblo Peppers are a Tier II junior ice hockey team based in Pueblo, Colorado, set to begin play in the North American Hockey League (NAHL) as a member of the Mountain Division. The Peppers will play their home games at the Pueblo Ice Arena & Events Center.

== History ==
The franchise began in 2005 as the North Iowa Outlaws based in Mason City, Iowa, where the team played for five seasons until moving to Onalaska, Wisconsin, in 2010 under owner Mark Motz as the Coulee Region Chill. The team was then sold to Michelle Bryant in 2012 and the franchise was eventually moved in 2014 to nearby La Crosse, Wisconsin, with games at the Green Island Ice Arena.

After the 2017–18 season, Chill owner Michelle Bryant sold the franchise to Steve Black of JB Black Enterprise, LLC, the owner of the NA3HL's New Ulm Steel. Black relocated the Chill franchise to Chippewa Falls, Wisconsin, as the Chippewa Steel to play out of Chippewa Area Ice Arena. Bryant would then rename her NA3HL team from La Crosse Freeze to Coulee Region Chill while continuing to play out of La Crosse. Al Rooney was named the Steel's first head coach and general manager, but was relieved of duties 23 games into his first season with a 5–16–1–1 record. Assistant coach Carter Foguth was named the interim head coach for the remainder of the season before be given the role permanently at the end of the season.

In March 2021, it was reported that Steve Black sold the Steel and the Tier III New Ulm Steel to an ownership group led by Kelly Kasik. The sale was confirmed on April 16 along with the announcement of new general manager and head coach Mike Janda. However, Janda was then given a two-year suspension in August 2021 by USA Hockey for manipulating records to use non-eligible players when he held a previous coaching job on a youth team and was subsequently released by the Steel. The Steel then hired Casey Mignone, the assistant coach of the St. Cloud Norsemen.

On June 12, 2026 (although reports of the Steel moving were leaked beforehand), the NAHL announced that, along with a new Mountain division being formed, the Chippewa Steel would relocate to Pueblo, Colorado.

On July 1, the Pueblo Peppers name, logo and color scheme were announced.

== Season-by-season records ==
Season	GP	W	L	OTL	PTS	GF	GA	PIM	Finish	Playoffs
North Iowa Outlaws
2005–06	58	18	37	3	39	149	219	1439	5th of 5, Central; 19th of 20, NAHL	Did not qualify
2006–07	62	27	29	6	60	174	198	1446	4th of 6, Central; 12th of 17, NAHL	Lost Div. Semifinal series, 2–3 (Fargo-Moorhead Jets)
2007–08	58	38	16	4	80	195	137	1209	1st of 8, Central; 4th of 18, NAHL	Lost Div. Semifinal series, 0–3 (Springfield Jr. Blues)
2008–09	58	35	18	5	75	229	171	1107	2nd of 5, Central t-7th of 19, NAHL	Lost Div. Semifinal series, 1–3 (Owatonna Express)
2009–10	58	15	37	6	36	147	234	915	5th of 5, Central; 18th of 19, NAHL	Did not qualify
Coulee Region Chill
2010–11	58	33	20	5	71	204	180	982	t-2nd of 6, Central t-10th of 26, NAHL	Won Div. Semifinal series, 3–1 (Owatonna Express); Lost Div. Final series, 2–3 (Bismarck Bobcats)
2011–12	60	18	35	7	43	162	229	996	4th of 5, MidWest t-23rd of 28, NAHL	Lost Div. Semifinal series, 0–3 (St. Louis Bandits)
2012–13	60	16	39	5	37	157	224	849	6th of 6, Central; 23rd of 24, NAHL	Did not qualify
2013–14	60	31	28	1	63	181	181	1011	5th of 6, Midwest; 15th of 24, NAHL	Did not qualify
2014–15	60	28	23	9	65	176	182	987	3rd of 5, Midwest; 12th of 24, NAHL	Lost Div. Semifinal series, 2–3 (Minnesota Wilderness)
2015–16	60	33	26	1	67	177	165	883	4th of 6, Midwest t-11th of 22, NAHL	Lost Div. Semifinal series, 1–3 (Fairbanks Ice Dogs)
2016–17	60	31	27	2	64	220	220	920	4th of 6, Midwest; 16th of 24, NAHL	Lost Div. Semifinal series, 0–3 (Janesville Jets)
2017–18	60	17	34	9	43	162	214	661	5th of 6, Midwest; 21st of 23, NAHL	Did not qualify
Chippewa Steel
2018–19	60	19	38	3	41	149	220	1019	6th of 6, Midwest; 22nd of 24, NAHL	Did not qualify
2019–20	51	29	18	4	62	171	146	798	2nd of 6, Midwest; 11th of 23, NAHL	Postseason cancelled
2020–21	48	14	29	5	33	116	169	904	5th of 5, Midwest; 22nd of 23, NAHL	Did not qualify
2021–22	60	25	31	4	54	168	206	772	7th of 8, Midwest; 24 of 29, NAHL	Did not qualify
2022–23	60	31	25	4	66	186	172	806	4th of 8, Midwest; 13 of 29, NAHL	Lost Div. Semifinal series, 0–3 (Wisconsin Windigo)
2023–24	60	29	25	6	64	170	188	646	5th of 8, Midwest; 20 of 32, NAHL	Did not qualify
2024–25	59	30	23	6	66	182	186	1024	4th of 8, Midwest; 14 of 35, NAHL	Lost Div. Semifinal series, 1–3 (Wisconsin Windigo)
2025-26	59	11	44	4	26	119	260	1322	8th of 8 Midwest; 34th of 34 NAHL	Did not qualify
Pueblo Peppers
2026-27	0	0	0	0	0	0	0	0	TBD	TBD
