= Anchorage Wolverines =

- City: Anchorage, Alaska
- League: North American Hockey League
- Division: Midwest
- Founded: 2021
- Home arena: Ben Boeke Ice Arena 2021-2024, Sullivan Arena 2024–present
- Colors: navy, teal, squash
- Owners: Aaron Schutt, Marissa Flannery Schutt, Jay Frawner, Jena Frawner, John Ellsworth, Jr. and Kari Ellsworth
- Head coach: Nick Walters (2023–2025), Evan Trupp (2022–2023), Mike Aikens (2021–22 & 2025-Current)
- Media: Isaac Smolden Play by play, Color Commentary Parker Hovila, Mike Cook Head of Broadcast.

The Anchorage Wolverines are a Tier II junior Ice Hockey team that became a member of the North American Hockey League in 2021.

== History ==
For The 2024–25 season The Anchorage Wolverines Announce move to Sullivan Arena after playing since inauguration at The Ben Boeke Ice Rink (2021–2024)

The Anchorage Wolverines junior hockey team announced Evan Trupp as the second head coach.

The Anchorage Wolverines, who also boast the Volunteer of the Year, were named Organization of the Year in their first campaign. Three Wolverines players were further selected for the All-Midwest Division Team.

== Season-by-season records ==
| Season | GP | W | L | OTL | PTS | GF | GA | PIM | Finish | Playoffs |
|---|---|---|---|---|---|---|---|---|---|---|
Anchorage Wolverines
| 2021–22 | 51 | 33 | 19 | 8 | 74 | 208 | 166 | 1036 | 3rd of 8, Midwest; 9th of 29 NAHL | Won Div. Semifinals series, 3–0 (Springfield Jr. Blues); Won Div. Finals series, 3–0 (Minnesota Wilderness); Won Robertson Cup Semifinal series, 2–0 (St. Cloud Norsemen); Lost Robertson Cup Championship, 0–3 (New Jersey Titans) |
| 2022–23 | 60 | 28 | 24 | 8 | 64 | 208 | 218 | 1009 | 5th of 8, Midwest; 19th of 29 NAHL | did not qualify for post season play |
| 2023–24 | 60 | 39 | 14 | 7 | 85 | 233 | 169 | 1144 | 1st of 8, Midwest; 4 of 32 NAHL | Won Div. Semifinal series, 3–1 (Minnesota Wilderness); Won Div. Final series, 3–0 (Wisconsin Windigo); Lost Robertson Cup Semifinal series, 0–2 (Lone Star Brahmas) |
| 2024–25 | 59 | 36 | 17 | 6 | 78 | 234 | 188 | 1209 | 2nd of 8 Midwest; 11th of 35 NAHL | Won Div. Semifinal series, 3–0 (Fairbanks Ice Dogs); Lost Div. Final series, 2–3 (Wisconsin Windigo) |
| 2025–26 | 59 | 32 | 21 | 6 | 70 | 221 | 212 | 1204 | 4th of 8, Midwest; 12 of 34 NAHL | Lost Div. Semifinal series, 1-3 (Minnesota Wilderness); Won Div. Final series, 3–0 (Wisconsin Windigo); Lost Robertson Cup Semifinal series, 0–2 (Lone Star Brahmas) |
