= Northeast Generals =

- City: Canton, Massachusetts
- League: North American Hockey League
- Division: East
- Founded: 2016
- Home arena: Canton Ice House
- Colors: Orange, navy blue, and white
- Owners: Bryan Erikson; Rich O’Dowd; Bob Penfield
- General manager: Bryan Erikson
- Affiliates: Northeast Generals

Franchise history
- 2016–present: Northeast Generals

The Northeast Generals are a Tier II junior ice hockey team based in Canton, Massachusetts. The team competes in the North American Hockey League (NAHL).

== History ==
In 2015, the organization added a Tier III junior team to the North American 3 Eastern Hockey League (NA3EHL). The team finished last in the East Division with a 9–32–3 record. In 2016, the NA3EHL was merged into the North American 3 Hockey League (NA3HL) and the Tier III Generals followed.

On April 1, 2016, the Generals were also approved for a Tier II junior team in the NA3HL's overseeing organization, the North American Hockey League (NAHL). The Generals became the easternmost team in the NAHL. Continuing his position from the Tier III team, their first head coach and general manager was Bryan Erikson. After 29 straight losses to start the season, Erikson stepped down as coach and hired Joe Lovell as his replacement. The Generals won their first game in their second game under Lovell on January 7, 2017, over the Wilkes-Barre/Scranton Knights. They would go on to finish the season with 4–53–3–0 record and last in the league. The Generals made the Robertson Cup playoffs in the following season, but lost in the semifinals to the Philadelphia Rebels. In their third season, they made it to the Robertson Cup playoffs, but lost in the first round to the Johnstown Tomahawks.

In 2019, Joe Lovell left the team and launched the New England Knights in the North American 3 Hockey League, while Erikson took over as head coach of the Generals again.

In 2024, the team relocated to the Canton Ice House in Canton, Massachusetts.

== Season-by-season records ==
Season	GP	W	L	OTL	SOL	Pts	GF	GA	PIM	Finish	Playoffs
2016–17	60	4	53	3	0	11	116	305	1609	5th of 5, East Div. 24th of 24, NAHL	Did not qualify for post season play
2017–18	60	29	26	4	1	63	184	205	1008	4th of 5, East Div. 15th of 23, NAHL	Lost Div. Semifinals, 2–3 vs. Philadelphia Rebels
2018–19	60	24	25	7	4	59	171	195	949	4th of 6, East Div. 16th of 24, NAHL	Lost Div. Semifinals, 2–3 vs. Johnstown Tomahawks
2019–20	50	20	27	2	1	43	157	191	782	6th of 7, East Div. 20th of 26, NAHL	Season cancelled
2020–21	60	20	32	6	2	48	164	217	1095	5th of 6, East Div. 17th of 23, NAHL	Did not qualify for post season play
2021–22	60	35	24	0	1	71	199	200	1076	4th of 7, East Div. 13th of 29, NAHL	Lost Div. Semifinals, 2–3 vs. New Jersey Titans
2022–23	60	30	25	4	1	65	190	191	1090	3rd of 7, East Div. 15th of 29, NAHL	Lost Div. Semifinals, 0–3 vs. Maryland Black Bears
2023–24	60	27	31	1	1	56	188	206	1395	6th of 9 East Div; 22nd of 32 NAHL	Lost Div. Play-In, 0-2 vs. Rochester Jr. Americans
2024–25	59	19	33	4	3	45	197	250	124	10th of 10 East Div; 31st of 35 NAHL	Did Not Qualify
2025–26	59	31	22	5	1	68	197	177	1546	4th of 10 East Div; 14th of 34 NAHL	Won Div. Play-In, 2-1 vs. Maine Nordiques; Lost Div. Semifinals 2-3 Rochester Jr. Americans
