= Maine Nordiques (NAHL) =

Ice hockey team

- City: Auburn, Maine
- League: North American Hockey League
- Division: East
- Founded: 2019
- Home arena: Norway Savings Bank Arena
- Colors: Light blue, red, white
- Owners: Shift Sports and Entertainment
- General manager: Nick Skerlick
- Head coach: Nick Skerlick
- Affiliates: Maine Nordiques (NA3HL)

Franchise history
- 2019–2026: Maine Nordiques

The Maine Nordiques were a Tier II junior ice hockey team in the North American Hockey League's East Division. The Nordiques played their home games at Norway Savings Bank Arena in Auburn, Maine. The team was founded in 2019 and was owned by Shift Sports and Entertainment.

== History ==
On February 28, 2019, the North American Hockey League (NAHL) announced that they had approved the membership application submitted by ISS Kings Youth Hockey Club, LLC for a team in Lewiston, Maine, owned by Darryl Antonacci and that the team would start play in the 2019–20 season as a member of the East Division. The team shared the Androscoggin Bank Colisée and a development program with the Tier III Lewiston/Auburn Nordiques that has a team in the North American 3 Hockey League (NA3HL). The organization is named after the former professional team, the Maine Nordiques. Antonacci promoted his head coach from the ISS Kings youth team, Nolan Howe, son of Hall of Fame player Mark Howe, as the NAHL team's first head coach.

In March 2020, team owner Antonacci agreed to purchase the Androscoggin Bank Colisée and the Tier III Nordiques from the arena owner Jim Cain. As part of the turnover, Antonacci folded the Tier III junior team and replaced it with Tier 1 youth teams. Both leagues cancelled their 2019–20 seasons due to the COVID-19 pandemic.

Nolan Howe was fired and replaced by associate head coach Matt Pinchevsky 16 games into the 2021–22 season.

On May 5, 2023, the NAHL announced that team owner Darryl Antonacci had sold the Nordiques to Shift Sports and Entertainment, LLC. The agreement included a five-year lease renewal at the Colisée.

In March 2025, the Nordiques honored the Lewiston Maineiacs, the prior tenants of the Colisée who played in the Quebec Maritimes Junior Hockey League from 2003 to 2011. The Nordiques wore Maineiacs jerseys and brought back former Maineiacs players over a three-game span.

In June 2025, the Nordiques agreed to terminate the remaining time on their five-year lease extension in order to facilitate a sale of the Colisée. The Colisée was subsequently sold to Mill Town Sports and Entertainment in a deal finalized in July 2025. Shortly thereafter, Mill Town Sports and Entertainment announced that they could not come to a lease extension with the Nordiques, citing unpaid bills from Shift Sports and Entertainment. The Nordiques will instead play the 2025–26 season at the Norway Savings Bank Arena in neighboring Auburn, Maine. Mill Town Sports and Entertainment subsequently moved their Tewksbury, Massachusetts-based United States Premier Hockey League team into the Colisée, rebranding them to the Lewiston MAINEiacs.

On May 24, 2026, following the conclusion of the NAHL season, the Nordiques announced they were ceasing operations.

== Season-by-season records ==
| Season | GP | W | L | OTL | Pts | GF | GA | Finish | Playoffs |
|---|---|---|---|---|---|---|---|---|---|
| 2019–20 | 54 | 20 | 32 | 2 | 42 | 190 | 230 | 7th of 7, East Div. 21st of 26, NAHL | Postseason cancelled |
| 2020–21 | 56 | 35 | 19 | 2 | 72 | 169 | 163 | 2nd of 6, East Div. 5th of 23, NAHL | Won Div. Semifinals, 3–2 vs. New Jersey Titans; Won Div. Finals, 3–0 vs. Maryland Black Bears; Lost Robertson Cup Semifinals, 0–2 vs. Shreveport Mudbugs |
| 2021–22 | 60 | 22 | 27 | 11 | 55 | 200 | 243 | 6th of 7, East Div. 23rd of 29, NAHL | did not qualify for postseason play |
| 2022–23 | 60 | 33 | 24 | 3 | 69 | 208 | 188 | 3rd of 7, East Div. 11th of 29, NAHL | Won Div. Semifinals, 3–0 vs. New Jersey Titans, lost Div. Finals 1–3 vs. Maryland Black Bears |
| 2023–24 | 60 | 37 | 17 | 6 | 80 | 236 | 178 | 2nd of 9 East Div. 9th of 32 NAHL | Won Div. Semifinals, 3–2 vs. Rochester Jr. Americans, Lost Div. Finals, 2–3 vs. Maryland Black Bears |
| 2024–25 | 47 | 28 | 15 | 4 | 60 | 149 | 113 | 2nd of 10 East Div; 8th of 35 NAHL | Won Play in Rd, 2–1 vs. New Hampshire Mountain Kings, Won Div. Semifinals, 3–1 Maryland Black Bears; Lost Div Finals 1–3 (Rochester Jr. Americans) |
| 2025–26 | 59 | 32 | 23 | 4 | 68 | 172 | 167 | 5th of 10 East Div. 15th of 34 NAHL | Lost Div. Playin, 1–2 vs. Northeast Generals |
