= 2023–24 NAHL season =

- League: North American Hockey League
- Sport: Ice hockey
- Duration: Regular season September 8, 2023 – April 13, 2024; Postseason; April 12 – May 21, 2024
- Games: 60
- Teams: 32

Draft
- Top draft pick: Jack Rimmer
- Picked by: Colorado Grit

Regular season
- Season champions: Lone Star Brahmas
- Season MVP: Max Martin (Wisconsin Windigo)
- Top scorer: Max Martin (Wisconsin Windigo)

Robertson Cup Playoffs
- Robertson Cup Playoffs MVP: Jacob MacDonald (Brahmas)
- Finals champions: Lone Star Brahmas
- Runners-up: Maryland Black Bears

NAHL seasons
- ← 2022–23 2024–25 →

The 2023–24 NAHL season was the 40th season of the North American Hockey League. The regular season ran from September 13, 2024 to April 12, 2025 with a 60-game schedule for each team. The Lone Star Brahmas won the regular season championship and went on to defeat the Maryland Black Bears 4–2 in the Championship game to capture the Robertson Cup.

== Member changes ==
- On December 8, 2022, the Rochester Americans announced that they were resuming their affiliation with junior hockey and restarting the Rochester Jr. Americans program. This was at least the fifth time that a team would possess that name and the newest edition would begin play in the fall of 2023.
- In 2023, the NAHL granted a provisional franchise to Watertown, South Dakota following the completion of the Prairie Lakes Ice Arena. Construction delays pushed back the opening of the new rink forcing the entry of the franchise to be delayed until 2024–25.
- On January 6, 2023, the Colorado Grit were announced as an expansion franchise that would begin playing the following September.
- On March 16, 2023, the New Hampshire Mountain Kings were added as another expansion franchise that would also start the following year.

== Regular season ==
The standings at the end of the regular season were as follows:

Note: x = clinched playoff berth; y = clinched division title; z = clinched regular season title

=== Standings ===
==== Central Division ====
Team	GP	W	L	OTL	SOL	Pts	GF	GA
xy – Minot Minotauros	60	44	14	1	1	90	208	125
x – Bismarck Bobcats	60	40	16	1	3	84	209	145
x – Aberdeen Wings	60	31	24	2	3	67	187	183
x – Austin Bruins	60	31	25	3	1	66	161	163
St. Cloud Norsemen	60	26	21	6	7	65	174	171
North Iowa Bulls	60	11	47	0	2	24	110	262

==== East Division ====
Team	GP	W	L	OTL	SOL	Pts	GF	GA
xy – Maryland Black Bears	60	41	14	2	3	87	208	145
x – Maine Nordiques	60	37	17	1	5	80	236	178
x – Rochester Jr. Americans	60	34	18	2	6	76	213	177
x – Johnstown Tomahawks	60	36	21	1	2	75	208	178
x – New Jersey Titans	60	35	22	3	0	56	188	206
x – Northeast Generals	60	27	31	1	1	56	188	206
Philadelphia Rebels	60	26	30	0	4	56	175	204
New Hampshire Mountain Kings	60	20	35	5	0	45	148	214
Danbury Jr. Hat Tricks	60	16	36	6	2	40	135	233

==== Midwest Division ====
Team	GP	W	L	OTL	SOL	Pts	GF	GA
xy – Anchorage Wolverines	60	39	14	2	5	85	233	169
x – Wisconsin Windigo	60	39	15	3	3	84	224	146
x – Janesville Jets	60	33	22	4	1	71	234	194
x – Minnesota Wilderness	60	30	25	2	3	65	157	170
Chippewa Steel	60	29	25	4	2	64	170	188
Fairbanks Ice Dogs	60	22	30	2	6	52	158	211
Springfield Jr. Blues	60	21	29	9	1	52	151	218
Kenai River Brown Bears	60	20	34	4	2	46	171	232

==== South Division ====
Team	GP	W	L	OTL	SOL	Pts	GF	GA
xyz – Lone Star Brahmas	60	44	10	3	3	94	206	109
x – Shreveport Mudbugs	60	41	17	0	2	84	208	141
x – El Paso Rhinos	60	38	16	4	2	82	180	146
x – New Mexico Ice Wolves	60	32	19	6	3	73	195	179
x – Amarillo Wranglers	60	32	20	6	2	72	178	184
x – Oklahoma Warriors	60	31	22	5	2	69	187	169
Odessa Jackalopes	60	23	29	5	3	54	162	187
Corpus Christi IceRays	60	19	35	3	3	44	154	239
Colorado Grit	60	12	41	5	2	31	142	248

=== Statistics ===
==== Scoring leaders ====
The following players led the league in regular season points at the completion of games played on April 13, 2024.

Player	Team	GP	G	A	Pts	PIM
Max Martin	Wisconsin Windigo	60	44	53	97	47
Sixten Jennersjö	Northeast Generals	60	16	67	83	87
Dominik Bartecko	New Jersey Titans	59	32	51	83	62
Matteo Disipio	Rochester Jr. Americans	60	30	51	81	10
Massimo Gentile	Rochester Jr. Americans	60	31	44	75	102
Austin Salani	Austin Bruins	60	32	38	70	88
Haden Kruse	Janesville Jets	55	23	47	70	41
Conner Brown	Janesville Jets	55	9	56	65	58
Ivan Zadvernyuk	Lone Star Brahmas	59	21	43	64	56
Charles-Edward Tardif	Maine Nordiques	60	36	28	64	60
Fyodor Nikolayenya	Anchorage Wolverines	58	27	37	64	105

==== Leading goaltenders ====
Note: GP = Games played; Mins = Minutes played; W = Wins; L = Losses; OTL = Overtime losses; SOL = Shootout losses; SO = Shutouts; GAA = Goals against average; SV% = Save percentage

Player	Team	GP	Mins	W	L	OTL	SOL	GA	SV	SV%	GAA
Jack Weineke	Maryland/Lone Star	28	1595:21	22	2	2	1	37	633	.942	1.39
Max Beckford	Wisconsin Windigo	24	1409:49	18	4	0	2	43	713	.940	1.83
Deivs Rolovs	Lone Star Brahmas	34	1899:14	22	7	1	1	58	713	.919	1.83
Eliot Séguin-Lescarbeau	Shreveport Mudbugs	38	2085:13	26	7	0	1	69	916	.925	1.99
Brady James	Minot Minotauros	32	1870:44	24	6	0	1	66	791	.917	2.12

== Robertson Cup playoffs ==
Teams are reseeded prior to the semifinal round based upon regular season records.

Division Play-in (Best-of-3)	Division Semifinals (Best-of-5)
C1	Minot Minotauros	9	3	7	-	-
C4	Austin Bruins	1	1	1	-	-
Central Division
C2	Bismarck Bobcats	5	2	2	8	4
C3	Aberdeen Wings	1	3*	3	2	1
E4	Johnstown Tomahawks	2	1	-
E5	New Jersey Titans	3*	4	-
E1	Maryland Black Bears	5	3*	3	-	-
E5	New Jersey Titans	3	2	1	-	-
East Division
E3	Rochester Jr. Americans	3	3	-
E6	Northeast Generals	0	2	-
E2	Maine Nordiques	4	5	1	1	2*
E3	Rochester Jr. Americans	2	2	2*	5	1
MW1	Anchorage Wolverines	4	2*	1	6	-
MW4	Minnesota Wilderness	0	1	4	2	-
Midwest Division
MW2	Wisconsin Windigo	4	2	3	-	-
MW3	Janesville Jets	2	0	1	-	-
S4	New Mexico Ice Wolves	2	6	-
S5	Amarillo Wranglers	1	3	-
S1	Lone Star Brahmas	3	2	3	4	-
S4	New Mexico Ice Wolves	1	0	4**	0	-
South Division
S3	El Paso Rhinos	2	4*	2
S6	Oklahoma Warriors	5	3	0
S2	Shreveport Mudbugs	4	2	3	1	2
S3	El Paso Rhinos	2	3****	2	3	0

Division Finals (Best-of-5)
C1	Minot Minotauros	5	6	3	3	-
C2	Bismarck Bobcats	2	2	4*	1	-
E1	Maryland Black Bears	0	1	0	4	6
E2	Maine Nordiques	2	0	3	2	2
MW1	Anchorage Wolverines	3	6	3	-	-
MW2	Wisconsin Windigo	2	3	0	-	-
S1	Lone Star Brahmas	2	3	4	4	-
S2	Shreveport Mudbugs	3	2	1	0	-

Semifinal (Best-of-3)
1	Lone Star Brahmas	8	2	-
4	Anchorage Wolverines	2	0	-
2	Minot Minotauros	3	2	-
3	Maryland Black Bears	7	6	-

Championship (Best-of-1)
1	Lone Star Brahmas	4
3	Maryland Black Bears	2

Note: * denotes overtime period(s)
