= 2019–20 NAHL season =

- League: North American Hockey League
- Sport: Ice hockey
- Duration: Regular season September 13, 2019 – March 12, 2020; Postseason; Cancelled
- Games: 60
- Teams: 23

Regular season
- Season champions: Lone Star Brahmas
- Season MVP: Christian Gorscak (Johnstown Tomahawks)
- Top scorer: Noah Kane (Maine Nordiques)

Robertson Cup Playoffs
- Finals champions: None

NAHL seasons
- ← 2018–19 2020–21 →

The 2019–20 NAHL season was the 36th season of the North American Hockey League. The regular season was scheduled to run from September 2019 to April 2020 with a 60-game schedule for all teams. The Lone Star Brahmas won the regular season championship due to having the most points when the season was suspended.

== COVID-19 ==
On March 12, 2020, the NAHL announced that it was suspending play across the entire league pending future developments. Less than a week later, the league cancelled the remainder of the schedule as well as the playoffs due to the Covid-19 pandemic.

== Member changes ==
- On February 28, 2019, the New Mexico Ice Wolves and Maine Nordiques, were both accepted as expansion franchises for this season.
- On June 3, 2019, the NAHL approved the relocation of the Brookings Blizzard to St. Cloud, Minnesota. Because the move happened so late in the offseason, the team retained the 'Blizzard' nickname and would choose a new moniker in the near future.

== Regular season ==
The standings at the end of the regular season were as follows:

Note: x = clinched playoff berth; y = clinched division title; z = clinched regular season title

=== Standings ===
==== Central Division ====
Team	GP	W	L	OTL	SOL	Pts	GF	GA
y – Aberdeen Wings	51	34	11	4	2	74	187	122
Bismarck Bobcats	52	32	12	5	3	72	178	130
Austin Bruins	51	28	16	2	5	63	158	149
Minot Minotauros	50	27	16	1	6	61	192	171
Minnesota Wilderness	52	26	22	4	0	56	160	165
St. Cloud Blizzard	52	10	37	4	1	25	130	240

==== East Division ====
Team	GP	W	L	OTL	SOL	Pts	GF	GA
y – New Jersey Titans	52	38	13	0	1	77	240	172
Johnstown Tomahawks	54	34	13	2	2	72	185	140
Wilkes-Barre/Scranton Knights	53	26	22	4	1	57	165	181
Maryland Black Bears	52	20	25	7	0	47	157	166
Jamestown Rebels	54	21	30	1	2	45	127	163
Northeast Generals	50	20	27	2	2	43	157	191
Maine Nordiques	54	20	32	2	0	42	190	230

==== Midwest Division ====
Team	GP	W	L	OTL	SOL	Pts	GF	GA
y – Fairbanks Ice Dogs	52	38	11	1	2	79	197	111
Chippewa Steel	51	29	18	3	1	62	171	146
Kenai River Brown Bears	52	27	19	3	3	60	197	182
Minnesota Magicians	53	21	23	6	3	51	143	173
Janesville Jets	52	24	26	1	1	50	149	181
Springfield Jr. Blues	48	14	29	2	3	33	116	169

==== South Division ====
Team	GP	W	L	OTL	SOL	Pts	GF	GA
yz – Lone Star Brahmas	52	42	9	1	1	86	190	81
Amarillo Bulls	54	39	10	2	3	83	185	101
Topeka Pilots	52	33	14	3	2	71	151	129
Shreveport Mudbugs	52	34	18	0	0	68	164	107
Corpus Christi IceRays	53	16	30	3	4	39	102	156
New Mexico Ice Wolves	52	13	34	2	3	31	105	190
Odessa Jackalopes	50	9	39	1	1	20	73	203

=== Statistics ===
==== Scoring leaders ====
The following players led the league in regular season points at the completion of all regular season games.

Player	Team	GP	G	A	Pts	PIM
Noah Kane	Maine Nordiques	54	20	44	64	66
Christian Gorscak	Johnstown Tomahawks	51	25	39	64	12
Matt Guerra	Lone Star Brahmas	51	18	45	63	103
Mitch Machlitt	New Jersey Titans	50	24	38	62	55
Dante Sheriff	Austin Bruins	47	17	45	62	97
Lincoln Hatten	Wilkes-Barre/Scranton Knights	50	27	34	61	121
Joey Baez	Lone Star Brahmas	53	32	26	58	18
Michael Outzen	New Jersey Titans	52	19	38	57	16
Kyle Jeffers	New Jersey Titans	48	23	34	57	49
Matt Allen	Amarillo Bulls	54	25	32	57	33

==== Leading goaltenders ====
Note: GP = Games played; Mins = Minutes played; W = Wins; L = Losses; OTL = Overtime losses; SOL = Shootout losses; SO = Shutouts; GAA = Goals against average; SV% = Save percentage

Player	Team	GP	Mins	W	L	OTL	SOL	GA	SV	SV%	GAA
Cayden Bailey	Lone Star Brahmas	30	1643:59	20	5	2	0	36	604	.940	1.31
Ludvig Persson	Lone Star Brahmas	28	1547:49	22	4	0	0	40	585	.932	1.55
Charlie Glockner	Amarillo Bulls	31	1790:16	18	5	2	2	51	720	.929	1.71
Max Gutjahr	Amarillo Bulls	26	1378:47	20	4	1	0	41	491	.917	1.78
Maiszon Balboa	Shreveport Mudbugs	28	1571:15	18	8	0	0	50	677	.926	1.91

== Robertson Cup playoffs ==
Cancelled due to COVID-19 pandemic
