= 2018–19 NAHL season =

- League: North American Hockey League
- Sport: Ice hockey
- Duration: Regular season September 13, 2018 – April 7, 2019; Postseason; April 12 – May 14, 2019
- Games: 60
- Teams: 24

Regular season
- Season champions: Johnstown Tomahawks
- Season MVP: Logan Jenuwine (Amarillo Bulls)
- Top scorer: Logan Jenuwine (Amarillo Bulls)

Robertson Cup Playoffs
- Robertson Cup Playoffs MVP: Matt Vernon (Wings)
- Finals champions: Aberdeen Wings
- Runners-up: Fairbanks Ice Dogs

NAHL seasons
- ← 2017–18 2019–20 →

The 2018–19 NAHL season was the 35th season of the North American Hockey League. The regular season ran from September 2018 to April 2019 with a 60-game schedule for each team. The Johnstown Tomahawks won the regular season championship on a tiebreaker. The Aberdeen Wings defeated the Fairbanks Ice Dogs 2–1 in the Championship game to capture the Robertson Cup.

== Member changes ==
- On April 12, 2018, the NAHL approved the addition of an expansion team in Odenton, Maryland. About a month later, the team was officially named as the Maryland Black Bears.
- At the end of April, the NAHL approved the sale and relocation of the Coulee Region Chill. The team was moved to Chippewa Falls, Wisconsin and became the Chippewa Steel. As a result of the move, the La Crosse Freeze of the North American 3 Hockey League would move to Onalaska, Wisconsin and become the Coulee Region Chill.
- After being purchased by Lamar Hunt Jr. in April, the Topeka RoadRunners revealed their new name of Topeka Pilots on June 5, 2018.
- In mid-June, the Philadelphia Rebels announced that they were moving to Jamestown, New York to become the Jamestown Rebels.

== Regular season ==
The standings at the end of the regular season were as follows:

Note: x = clinched playoff berth; y = clinched division title; z = clinched regular season title

=== Standings ===
==== Central Division ====
Team	GP	W	L	OTL	SOL	Pts	GF	GA
xy – Aberdeen Wings	60	47	10	2	1	97	255	124
x – Minot Minotauros	60	36	21	3	0	75	207	161
x – Bismarck Bobcats	60	34	21	3	2	73	182	163
x – Austin Bruins	60	32	22	0	6	70	167	161
Minnesota Wilderness	60	26	29	3	2	57	170	189
Brookings Blizzard	60	11	44	3	2	27	115	242

==== East Division ====
Team	GP	W	L	OTL	SOL	Pts	GF	GA
xyz – Johnstown Tomahawks	60	47	9	3	1	98	245	150
x – Jamestown Rebels	60	35	17	5	3	78	176	131
x – New Jersey Titans	60	31	26	3	0	65	184	190
x – Northeast Generals	60	24	25	7	4	59	171	195
Wilkes-Barre/Scranton Knights	60	26	29	4	1	57	153	175
Maryland Black Bears	60	16	37	5	2	39	141	244

==== Midwest Division ====
Team	GP	W	L	OTL	SOL	Pts	GF	GA
xy – Fairbanks Ice Dogs	60	37	16	3	4	81	204	138
x – Minnesota Magicians	60	36	21	3	0	75	175	154
x – Springfield Jr. Blues	60	33	22	4	1	71	192	177
x – Janesville Jets	60	29	25	3	3	64	153	186
Kenai River Brown Bears	60	23	31	3	3	52	139	174
Chippewa Steel	60	19	38	2	1	41	149	220

==== South Division ====
Team	GP	W	L	OTL	SOL	Pts	GF	GA
xy – Amarillo Bulls	60	46	8	3	3	98	263	136
x – Lone Star Brahmas	60	31	21	3	5	70	143	150
x – Shreveport Mudbugs	60	28	22	4	6	66	163	164
x – Corpus Christi IceRays	60	29	28	2	1	61	182	196
Topeka Pilots	60	23	29	3	5	54	158	210
Odessa Jackalopes	60	21	35	2	2	46	165	222

=== Statistics ===
==== Scoring leaders ====
The following players led the league in regular season points at the completion of all regular season games.

Player	Team	GP	G	A	Pts	PIM
Logan Jenuwine	Amarillo Bulls	59	60	44	104	80
Carson Brière	Johnstown Tomahawks	59	44	45	89	60
Samuel Solenský	Johnstown Tomahawks	55	24	62	86	54
Brandon Puricelli	Springfield Jr. Blues	59	30	50	80	48
Cameron Hebert	Johnstown Tomahawks	58	26	52	78	47
Gabriel Seger	Amarillo Bulls	58	18	52	70	49
Oliver Benwell	Johnstown Tomahawks	59	28	42	70	30
Brad Belisle	Aberdeen Wings	58	33	35	68	65
Louis Boudon	Northeast Generals	55	22	46	68	77
Ben Schmidling	Springfield Jr. Blues	60	37	31	68	24

==== Leading goaltenders ====
Note: GP = Games played; Mins = Minutes played; W = Wins; L = Losses; OTL = Overtime losses; SOL = Shootout losses; SO = Shutouts; GAA = Goals against average; SV% = Save percentage

Player	Team	GP	Mins	W	L	OTL	SOL	GA	SV	SV%	GAA
Mattias Sholl	Fairbanks Ice Dogs	25	1425:38	17	1	3	1	40	605	.934	1.68
Ryan Keane	Jamestown Rebels	36	2139:51	23	10	1	1	64	881	.927	1.80
Matt Vernon	Aberdeen Wings	52	3106:15	40	9	2	1	100	1,510	.934	1.93
Harrison Feeney	Lone Star Brahmas	29	1631:53	11	10	3	3	55	798	.931	2.02
Jason Grande	Amarillo Bulls	35	1977:18	24	7	2	0	68	906	.925	2.06

== Robertson Cup playoffs ==
Teams are reseeded prior to the semifinal round based upon regular season records.

Division Semifinals (Best-of-5)
C1	Aberdeen Wings	2	6	2	3	-
C4	Austin Bruins	1	2	4	1	-
Central Division
C2	Minot Minotauros	5	5	3	-	-
C3	Bismarck Bobcats	1	2	2	-	-
E1	Johnstown Tomahawks	4	3	3	2	4
E4	Northeast Generals	1	4	1	4	2
East Division
E2	Jamestown Rebels	5	4	0	2	2
E3	New Jersey Titans	3	1	3	3	3
MW1	Fairbanks Ice Dogs	2	4	4	-	-
MW4	Janesville Jets	0	1	1	-	-
Midwest Division
MW2	Minnesota Magicians	4	3	5	6	-
MW3	Springfield Jr. Blues	3	4*	0	3	-
S1	Amarillo Bulls	5	5	4*	5	3
S4	Corpus Christi IceRays	6	6*	3	2	1
South Division
S2	Lone Star Brahmas	5	2	1	2	2
S3	Shreveport Mudbugs	1	4	0	3	3***

Division Finals (Best-of-5)
C1	Aberdeen Wings	3	3	7	4	-
C2	Minot Minotauros	4*	1	2	2	-
E1	Johnstown Tomahawks	6	3	2	3	5
E3	New Jersey Titans	5	4*	3	1	0
MW1	Fairbanks Ice Dogs	5	6	6	-	-
MW2	Minnesota Magicians	1	2	1	-	-
S1	Amarillo Bulls	1	4	4*	0	6
S3	Shreveport Mudbugs	3	1	3	2	0

Semifinal (Best-of-3)
1	Johnstown Tomahawks	7	2	3
4	Fairbanks Ice Dogs	2	4	6
2	Amarillo Bulls	4	2	0
3	Aberdeen Wings	2	3*	3

Championship (Best-of-1)
4	Fairbanks Ice Dogs	1
3	Aberdeen Wings	2

Note: * denotes overtime period(s)
