= Austin Bruins =

- City: Austin, Minnesota
- League: North American Hockey League
- Division: Central
- Founded: 2010
- Home arena: Riverside Arena
- Colors: Black, gold, white
- Mascot: Bruiser
- Owner: Brian Raduenz
- President: Brian Schulz (2018– Present)
- Head coach: Steve Howard (2017– Present)
- Media: David Koier (play-by-play NAHLTV
- Affiliates: Rochester Grizzlies (NA3HL)

Franchise history
- 2010–present: Austin Bruins

Championships
- Division titles: 5 (2013, 2014, 2015, 2023, 2026)

The Austin Bruins are a Tier II junior ice hockey team in the North American Hockey League's Central Division. The Bruins play their home games in the Riverside Arena in Austin, Minnesota.

== History ==
The Bruins were an expansion team that first played in the North American Hockey League (NAHL) in the 2010–11 season. On January 19, 2012, it was announced the team signed a three-year deal to continue play in Austin.

== Season-by-season records ==
Season	GP	W	L	OTL	PTS	GF	GA	PIM	Finish	Playoffs
2010–11	58	23	31	4	50	151	186	1,233	5th of 6, Central; 20th of 26, NAHL	Did not qualify
2011–12	60	36	18	6	78	198	162	985	3rd of 5, Central t-11th of 28, NAHL	Won Div. Semifinal series, 3–1 (Alexandria Blizzard); Lost Div. Final series, 1–3 (Bismarck Bobcats)
2012–13	60	42	11	7	91	223	155	1204	1st of 6, Central; 2nd of 24, NAHL	Won Div. Semifinal series, 3–1 (Minot Minotauros); Lost Div. Final series, 1–3 (Bismarck Bobcats)
2013–14	60	40	19	1	81	187	145	1163	1st of 5, Central; 5th of 24, NAHL	Won Div. Semifinal series, 3–1 (Minot Minotauros); Won Div. Final series, 3–2 (Bismarck Bobcats); Won Robertson Cup Semifinal series, 2–1 (Lone Star Brahmas); Lost Robertson Cup Championship, 0–2 (Fairbanks Ice Dogs)
2014–15	60	38	11	11	87	210	136	1066	1st of 5, Central; 4th of 24, NAHL	Won Div. Semifinal series, 3–0 (Aberdeen Wings); Won Div. Final series, 3–2 (Minot Minotauros); Won Robertson Cup Semifinal series, 2–1 (Topeka RoadRunners); Lost Robertson Cup Championship series, 0–2 (Minnesota Wilderness)
2015–16	60	29	27	4	62	181	168	1215	3rd of 6, Central; 14th of 22, NAHL	Won Div. Semifinal series, 3–1 (Minot Minotauros); Lost Div. Final series, 2–3 (Bismarck Bobcats)
2016–17	60	24	27	9	57	185	202	1048	6th of 6, Central; 20th of 24, NAHL	Did not qualify
2017–18	60	33	19	8	74	176	160	894	2nd of 6, Central; 7th of 23, NAHL	Won Div. Semifinal series, 3–1 (Minnesota Wilderness); Lost Div. Final series, 0–3 (Minot Minotauros)
2018–19	60	32	22	6	70	167	161	1081	4th of 6, Central; 10th of 24, NAHL	Lost Div. Semifinal series, 1–3 (Aberdeen Wings)
2019–20	51	28	16	7	63	158	149	723	3rd of 6, Central; 10th of 26, NAHL	Postseason cancelled due to COVID-19 pandemic
2020–21	56	22	26	8	52	159	187	906	5th of 6, Central; 15th of 23, NAHL	Did not qualify
2021–22	60	31	23	6	68	178	186	1348	2nd of 6, Central; 16th of 29, NAHL	Lost Div. Semifinal series, 0–3 (Aberdeen Wings)
2022–23	60	34	16	10	78	187	151	1146	1st of 6, Central; 7th of 29, NAHL	Won Div. Semifinal series, 3–0 (Minot Minotauros); Won Div. Final series, 3–1 (St. Cloud Norsemen); Won Robertson Cup Semifinal series, 2–1 (Maryland Black Bears); Lost Robertson Cup Championship, 3–4 (Oklahoma Warriors)
2023–24	60	31	25	4	66	161	163	1042	4th of 6, Central, 18th of 32, NAHL	Lost Div. Semifinal series, 0–3 (Minot Minotauros)
2024–25	59	42	12	5	89	194	116		2nd of 8, Central, 3rd of 35, NAHL	Won Div. Semifinal series, 3–2 (Minot Minotauros); Lost Div. Final series, 1–3 (Bismarck Bobcats)
2025–26	59	43	12	2	90	241	131	1140	1st of 8, Central, 2nd of 34, NAHL	Won Div. Semifinal series, 3–0 (Watertown Shamrocks); Won Div. Final Series, 3–2 (Aberdeen Wings); Lost Robertson Cup Semifinal series, 0–2 (Minnesota Wilderness)
