= Minot Minotauros =

- City: Minot, North Dakota
- League: North American Hockey League
- Division: Central
- Founded: 2011
- Home arena: Maysa Arena
- Colors: Cardinal Red, Cream, Old Gold, Black, and White
- General manager: Cody Campbell
- Head coach: Cody Campbell
- Media: KMOT Minot Daily News

Franchise history
- 2011–present: Minot Minotauros

Championships
- Division titles: 2 (2017, 2024)

The Minot Minotauros (commonly known as the Tauros) are a Tier II junior ice hockey team playing in the North American Hockey League (NAHL). Based in Minot, North Dakota, the Tauros play their home games at Maysa Arena.

== History ==
The Tauros are Minot's fifth hockey team, following the El Paso/Minot Raiders of the Southwest Hockey League in 1975–76 and then as the Minot Rangers for the 1976–77 season, the Minot Maple Leafs of the Continental Hockey League for the 1985–86 season, the Minot Americans/Top Guns of the Saskatchewan Junior Hockey League from 1987 to 1997, and the Minot Muskies, which played in the America West Hockey League for the 2000–01 season.

== Season-by-season records ==
Season	GP	W	L	OTL	PTS	GF	GA	PIM	Finish	Playoffs
2011–12	60	7	49	4	18	104	252	1,313	5th of 5, Central; 28th of 28, NAHL	Did not qualify
2012–13	60	26	30	4	56	157	186	1,284	4th of 6, Central t-16th of 24, NAHL	Lost Div. Semifinal series, 1–3 vs. Austin Bruins
2013–14	60	24	33	3	51	130	165	797	4th of 5, Central; 19th of 24, NAHL	Lost Div. Semifinal series, 1–3 vs. Austin Bruins
2014–15	60	37	17	6	80	184	137	856	2nd of 5, Central; 7th of 24, NAHL	Won Div. Semifinal series, 3–0 vs. Bismarck Bobcats; Lost Div. Final series, 2–3 vs. Austin Bruins
2015–16	60	35	19	6	76	185	158	1106	2nd of 6, Central t-6th of 22, NAHL	Lost Div. Semifinal series, 1–3 vs. Austin Bruins
2016–17	60	38	18	4	80	192	156	1137	1st of 6, Central; 5th of 24, NAHL	Lost Div. Semifinal series, 1–3 vs. Aberdeen Wings
2017–18	60	28	26	6	62	161	168	839	4th of 6, Central; 16th of 23, NAHL	Won Div. Semifinal series, 3–2 vs. Aberdeen Wings; Won Div. Final series, 3–0 vs. Austin Bruins, Won Robertson Cup Semifinals, 2–1 vs. Fairbanks Ice Dogs; Lost Robertson Cup Championship game, 1–2 vs. Shreveport Mudbugs
2018–19	60	36	21	3	75	207	161	943	2nd of 6, Central t-6th of 24, NAHL	Won Div. Semifinal series, 3–0 vs. Bismarck Bobcats; Lost Div. Final series, 1–3 vs. Aberdeen Wings
2019–20	50	27	16	7	61	192	171	622	4th of 6, Central; 12th of 23, NAHL	Season cancelled
2020–21	56	23	25	8	54	150	199	972	t-3rd of 6, Central t-12th of 23, NAHL	Lost Div. Semifinal series, 2–3 vs. Aberdeen Wings
2021–22	60	28	29	3	59	173	184	1082	5th of 6, Central t-20th of 29, NAHL	Did not qualify
2022–23	60	31	27	2	64	180	189	843	t-3rd of 6, Central t-17th of 29, NAHL	Lost Div. Semifinal series, 0–3 vs. Austin Bruins
2023–24	60	44	14	2	90	208	125	919	1st of 6, Central; 2nd of 32, NAHL	Won Div. Semifinal series, 3-0 vs. Austin Bruins; Won Div. Final series, 3-1 vs. Bismarck Bobcats; Lost Robertson Semis, 0-2 vs. Maryland Black Bears
2024–25	42	32	9	1	65	160	72	574	2nd of 8, Central; 3rd of 35, NAHL	Lost Div. Semifinal series, 2-3 vs. Austin Bruins
2025–26	59	23	31	5	51	173	221	1026	7th of 8, Central; 29th of 34, NAHL	Did not qualify

== Notable alumni ==
The Minotauros have helped over 150 players move on to the NCAA level of play. The most notable alumni is Blake Lizotte of the Pittsburgh Penguins of the NHL. Other notable alumni of the program include Jon Lizotte (St. Cloud State, Wilkes Barre Scranton Penguins), Mason Morelli(University of Nebraska, Omaha, Hershey Bears, Henderson Silver Knights, Vegas Golden Knights) Johnny Walker (Arizona State, Utah Grizzlies) and Kyle Kukkonen (Michigan Tech, Anaheim Ducks).
