= Maryland Black Bears =

Ice hockey team in Odenton, Maryland, US

Coordinates: 39°03′41″N 76°43′35″W

- City: Odenton, Maryland
- League: North American Hockey League
- Division: East
- Founded: 2018
- Home arena: Piney Orchard Ice Arena
- Colors: Black, gold, red and white
- Owners: Piney Junior Hockey, LLC
- General manager: Clint Mylymok
- Head coach: Clint Mylymok
- Affiliates: Youngstown Phantoms (USHL); Team Maryland (EHL)
- Website: www.marylandblackbears.com

Franchise history
- 2018–present: Maryland Black Bears

Championships
- Division titles: 3 (2022–23, 2023–24, 2025-26)
- Robertson Cups: 1 (2025–26)

The Maryland Black Bears are a Tier II junior ice hockey team in the North American Hockey League's East Division. The Black Bears play their home games in the Piney Orchard Ice Arena in Odenton, Maryland. Founded in 2018, the Black Bears are the first team in the 42-year history of the NAHL to be based out of Maryland.

Playing on the NHL-sized sheet of ice at the Piney Orchard Ice Arena, a former training center of the NHL's Washington Capitals, the Black Bears' organization has exclusive use of over 7,000 square feet of space for locker rooms, training and equipment, offices, and workout areas. The organization also launched a team in the Tier III Eastern Hockey League, called Team Maryland, and several youth teams in the 2018–19 season, while also purchasing an ownership stake in the Tier I United States Hockey League's Youngstown Phantoms.

The Black Bears played their inaugural game on September 14, 2018, at Piney Orchard, losing 6–3 to the New Jersey Titans.

The Black Bears won their first Robertson Cup on May 19, 2026 at Fogerty Arena in Blaine, MN, winning 3-2 in overtime against the Minnesota Wilderness.

== Players ==
=== Current roster ===
#	Nat.	Name	Pos	Shoots/Catches	DOB	Height	Weight	Hometown
6	(United States)	Lachlan Bommer	F	L	2007-03-16	6'0"	185	Rye, New York, USA
23	(United States)	Owen Boucher	F	R	2007-01-02	6'0"	195	Grand Ledge, Michigan, USA
18	(United States)	Logan Deuling	F	L	2006-01-20	6'0"	190	Lexington, Kentucky, USA
24	(United States)	Tanner Duncan	F	L	2005-07-17	5'11"	185	Ridgefield, Connecticut, USA
20	(United States)	Jaden Duprey	F	R	2005-06-07	5'10"	165	St. Albans, Vermont, USA
16	(United States)	Kareem El Bashir	F	L	2004-03-02	5'10"	180	Ashburn, Virginia, USA
27	(United States)	Riley Fast	F	L	2006-09-05	6'1"	185	East Lansing, Michigan, USA
15	(Canada)	Josh Frenette	F	L	2006-01-15	6'4"	205	Oshawa, Ontario, Canada
13	(United States)	Trey Hinton	F	L	2006-05-28	5'10"	175	Castle Rock, Colorado, USA
25	(United States)	Thomas Holtby	F	R	2006-04-21	6'2"	200	Frederick, Maryland, USA
19	(Canada)	Luke Janus	F	L	2004-04-19	6'2"	200	Winnipeg, Manitoba, Canada
17	(Canada)	Kieran Litterick	F	R	2006-05-11	6'2"	190	Whitby, Ontario, Canada
14	(Sweden)	Isac Nielsen	F	L	2004-01-05	5'9"	170	Karlshamn, Sweden
9	(United States)	Luke Rubin	F	R	2005-02-03	5'11"	185	Fulton, Maryland, USA
91	(Sweden)	Markas Samenas	F	L	2004-02-02	6'5"	230	Söderfors, Sweden
10	(United States)	Harrison Smith	F	R	2006-02-07	5'10"	165	Wellington, Florida, USA
21	(United States)	Tyler Stern	F	R	2004-08-12	5'10"	174	Plainview, New York, USA
17	(United States)	David Van Iterson	F	L	2004-07-06	5'11"	185	Bethesda, Maryland, USA
2	(United States)	Dominik Boltnar	D	R	2006-05-22	6'2"	220	Des Moines, Iowa, USA
11	(United States)	Sebastien Brockman	D	L	2004-04-08	6'6"	220	El Segundo, California, USA
8	(Canada)	Liam Doherty	D	L	2005-10-26	6'4"	200	Toronto, Ontario, Canada
22	(United States)	Dylan Gordon	D	L	2004-08-13	5'10"	170	Chandler, Arizona, USA
5	(United States)	Aiden Lawson	D	L	2007-09-18	5'8"	150	Eagle River, Alaska, USA
26	(Sweden)	Victor Mannebratt	D	R	2005-04-16	6'1"	194	Särö, Sweden
12	(United States)	Sam Osei	D	R	2006-02-02	6'2"	185	Jericho, New York, USA
3	(United States)	Evan Sofikitis	D	R	2006-12-02	5'8"	179	Bloomfield Hills, Michigan, USA
7	(United States)	Mason Stenger	D	L	2006-03-05	6'1"	209	Maplewood, Minnesota, USA
31	(United States)	Ryan Denes	G	L	2007-01-08	6'0"	165	Santa Clarita, California, USA
33	(United States)	Logan Hughes	G	L	2006-03-23	6'4"	180	Fond du Lac, Wisconsin, USA
30	(United States)	Benji Motew	G	L	2004-11-24	6'0"	185	Glencoe, Illinois, USA
33	(United States)	Tyler Rounds	G	L	2007-09-19	6'2"	180	Ashburn, Virginia, USA

== Season-by-season records ==
Season	GP	W	L	OTL	Pts	GF	GA	Finish	Playoffs
2018–19	60	16	37	7	39	141	244	6th of 6, East; 23rd of 24, NAHL	did not qualify for post season play
2019–20	54	20	25	7	47	157	166	4th of 7, East; 18th of 26, NAHL	Balance of season cancelled due to covid
2020–21	56	25	21	8	58	146	159	4th of 6, East; 11th of 23, NAHL	Won Div. Semifinals, 3–2 vs. Johnstown Tomahawks; Lost Div. Finals, 0-3 vs. Maine Nordiques
2021–22	60	29	19	12	70	189	176	5th of 7, East; 14th of 29, NAHL	did not qualify for post season play
2022–23	60	40	15	5	85	215	140	1st of 7, East; 2nd of 29, NAHL	Won Div. Semifinals, 3-0 vs. Northeast Generals; Won Div. Finals 3-1 vs. Maine Nordiques; Lost Robertson Cup Semifinal 1-2 vs. Austin Bruins
2023–24	60	41	14	5	87	208	145	1st of 9, East, 3rd of 32 NAHL	Won Div. Semifinals, 3-0 vs. New Jersey Titans; Won Div. Finals, 3-2 vs. Maine Nordiques; Won Robertson Cup Semis, 2-0 vs. Minot Minotauros; Lost Robertson Cup Finals, 2-4 vs. Lone Star Brahmas
2024–25	44	28	13	3	59	146	119	3rd of 10 East; 9th of 35 NAHL	Lost Div. Semifinals, 1-3 vs. Maine Nordiques
2025–26	59	49	6	4	102	248	136	1st of 10, East, 1st of 34 NAHL	Won Div. Semifinals, 3-0 vs. Danbury Jr. Hat Tricks; Won Div. Finals, 3-1 vs. Rochester Jr. Americans; Won Robertson Cup Semis, 2-0 vs. Lone Star Brahmas; Won Robertson Cup 3-2 OTW Minnesota Wilderness
