= Minnesota Wilderness =

- City: Cloquet, Minnesota, United States
- League: North American Hockey League
- Division: Midwest
- Founded: 2003
- Home arena: Northwoods Credit Union Arena(Did play at St. Luke's Sports and Events Center to start 2023)
- Colors: Gray, Black, and Green
- General manager: Brandon Ferns
- Head coach: Zach Stepan
- Affiliates: Minnesota Wilderness (NA3HL)

Franchise history
- Junior A/Tier III franchise
- 2000–2004: Northwest Wisconsin Knights
- 2004–2010: Wisconsin Mustangs
- 2010–2012: Wisconsin Wilderness
- 2012–2013: Minnesota Wilderness
- Tier II NAHL franchise
- 2003–2006: Texarkana Bandits
- 2006–2012: St. Louis Bandits
- 2013–present: Minnesota Wilderness

The Minnesota Wilderness are a Tier II junior ice hockey team based in Cloquet, Minnesota, and play in the North American Hockey League (NAHL). The organization formerly fielded teams in the Canada-based Junior A Superior International Junior Hockey League for three seasons and in the American-based Tier III Minnesota Junior Hockey League.

Prior to the 2013–14 season, the Wilderness' owners bought the franchise rights to the St. Louis Bandits of the Tier II North American Hockey League, and began play for that season.

In 2024, the Minnesota Loons of the NA3HL were sold and moved from Breezy Point, Minnesota to Eveleth, Minnesota and renamed to the Minnesota Wilderness, putting them under the same umbrella as the NAHL's Minnesota Wilderness. Their logo will be the same. They will play in the West Division in the 3HL, which will allow them to still be one of the 5 Minnesota-Located teams in that Division.

== History ==
Mustangs' Logo

=== 2000–09 ===
The organization was founded in 2000 as the Northwest Wisconsin Knights in Spooner, Wisconsin, as a Junior B team in the Minnesota Junior Hockey League (MnJHL). In 2004, the Knights changed their name to the Wisconsin Mustangs. In 2006, the MnJHL was promoted to Tier III Junior A status by USA Hockey. From 2001 until 2003, the Knights had an interleague relationship with the Superior International Junior Hockey League (SIJHL) of Hockey Canada. The 2009–10 season saw them back in an interlock with the SIJHL.

=== 2010–19 ===
2011 Wilderness

On May 17, 2010, the Mustangs announced they were officially leaving the MnJHL, their players were released to a dispersal draft. Soon after they applied for entry into the SIJHL. After a couple months of petitioning USA Hockey to join a Hockey Canada-sanctioned league, they were allowed entry. The team dropped the Mustangs logo, colors, and name as the organization entered the new league as the Wisconsin Wilderness.

On September 17, 2010, the Wilderness played their first game as a full member of the SIJHL, on the road, against the Sioux Lookout Flyers, winning the game 3–2. On September 24, 2010, the Wilderness became the first American-based full membership SIJHL team to host a regular season game in the United States. The Wilderness defeated the Fort Frances Lakers 4–3. In 2011, the Wilderness won the league championship in their inaugural SIJHL season.

In the summer of 2012, the team relocated to Cloquet, Minnesota, and changed their name to the Minnesota Wilderness.

On May 4, 2013, the Wilderness became the first American team to win the Dudley Hewitt Cup by defeating the St. Michael's Buzzers 4–3 in overtime in the Central Canada final. They also became the first American team to participate in the Royal Bank Cup tournament, the Canadian National Junior A championship.

After winning the Dudley Hewitt Cup, the Wilderness announced that the 2013 Royal Bank Cup would be their final foray in Canadian junior hockey as they joined the North American Hockey League (NAHL) at the beginning of the 2013–14 season. At the Royal Bank Cup, Minnesota finished fourth in the round-robin with a 1–3 record. In the semifinal, they surrendered a 4–2 third period lead to the Alberta Junior Hockey League's Brooks Bandits to lose 5–4 in overtime. Their loss to Brooks ended their hopes of a national championship and was their final game as members of the Superior International Junior Hockey League.

In 2013, the Wilderness bought the franchise rights of the dormant St. Louis Bandits franchise to obtain entry into the NAHL.

=== 2020–present ===
In July 2022, the Wilderness fired assistant coach Brendan Phelps over allegations that he solicited a 16-year-old boy for sex online. He was also temporarily suspended by the United States Center for SafeSport. In season 2022-2023 Minnesota Wilderness went onto winning the Midwest Division for the second time in franchise history, Kevin Marx Norén set new all time single season franchise goalscoring record for the Minnesota wilderness. The following season The Minnesota Wilderness Loss in the first round of playoffs in the midwest divisional semi-finals.

== Season-by-season records ==
Season	GP	W	L	T	OTL	SOL	Pts	GF	GA	Finish	Playoffs
Minnesota Junior Hockey League (MnJHL)
2000–01	36	26	9	—	1	—	53	192	120	3rd, MnJHL	
2001–02	42	30	10	—	2	—	62	227	160	2nd, MnJHL	
2002–03	42	29	10	—	3	—	61	221	132	3rd, MnJHL	
2003–04	40	14	25	1	3	—	32	152	194	5th, MnJHL	
2004–05	48	11	34	1	2	—	25	151	267	6th, MnJHL	
2005–06	48	21	23	3	1	—	46	180	196	4th, MnJHL	
2006–07	40	25	12	3	0	—	53	176	130	3rd, MnJHL	Lost Semifinal
2007–08	48	38	5	—	5	—	81	268	122	2nd, MnJHL	Lost Quarterfinal
2008–09	48	29	17	—	2	—	60	219	172	4th, MnJHL	Lost Semifinal
2009–10	50	28	18	—	4	—	60	189	148	4th, MnJHL	Lost Semifinal
Superior International Junior Hockey League (SIJHL)
2010–11	56	45	6	—	5	—	95	264	122	1st, SIJHL	Won Super Series, 1–1 (2–1 SO) (Lakers); Won Semi-final, 4–0 (North Stars); Won Final, 4–0 (Ice Dogs); 4th of 4 DHC Round-Robin (0–2–1)
2011–12	56	49	6	—	1	—	99	259	97	1st, SIJHL	Lost Super Series, 1–1 (5–6 SO) (Lakers); Won Semi-final, 4–0 (North Stars); Won Final, 4–3 (Lakers); 4th of 4 DHC Round-Robin (1–0–2)
2012–13	56	51	3	—	2	—	104	282	85	1st, SIJHL	Won Semi-final, 4–0 (Iron Rangers); Won Final, 4–2 (Lakers); 1st of 4 DHC Round-Robin (2–0–1); Won DHC Final, 4–3 OT (Buzzers); 4th of 5 RBC Round-Robin (1–3–0); Lost RBC Semi-final, 4–5 OT (Bandits)
North American Hockey League (NAHL)
2013–14	60	37	14	—	9	—	83	159	115	2nd of 6, Midwest; 4th of 24, NAHL	Lost Div. Semifinal series, 2–3 vs. Wenatchee Wild
2014–15	60	39	15	—	6	—	84	209	152	2nd of 5, Midwest; 8th of 24, NAHL	Won Div. Semifinal series, 3–2 vs. Coulee Region Chill; Won Div. Final series, 3–0 vs. Fairbanks Ice Dogs; Won Semifinal series, 2–0 vs. Janesville Jets; Won Championship series, 2–0 vs. Austin Bruins
2015–16	60	34	18	—	7	—	76	183	161	3rd, Midwest t-7th of 22, NAHL	Won Div. Semifinal series, 3–1 vs. Janesville Jets; Lost Div. Final series, 2–3 vs. Fairbanks Ice Dogs
2016–17	60	32	22	—	4	2	70	188	179	2nd, Central; 9th of 24, NAHL	Won Div. Semifinal series, 3–2 vs. Brookings Blizzard; Lost Div. Final series, 2–3 vs. Aberdeen Wings
2017–18	60	33	21	—	3	3	72	184	181	3rd, Central t-8th of 23, NAHL	Lost Div. Semifinal series, 1–3 vs. Austin Bruins
2018–19	60	26	29	—	3	2	57	170	189	5th, Central t-17th of 24, NAHL	did not qualify
2019–20	52	26	22	—	4	0	56	160	165	5th, Central; 15th of 23, NAHL	Posteason cancelled
2020–21	56	25	27	—	1	3	54	136	168	t-3rd, Central t-12th of 23, NAHL	Lost Div. Semifinal series, 0–3 vs. Bismarck Bobcats
2021–22	60	35	23	—	1	1	72	216	203	4th of 8, Midwest; 12th of 29, NAHL	Won Div. Semifinal series, 3-2 vs. Fairbanks Ice Dogs; Lost Div. Final series, 1-3 Anchorage Wolverines
2022–23	60	35	18	—	3	4	77	168	146	2nd of 8, Midwest; 8th of 29, NAHL	Won Div. Semifinal series, 3-0 vs. Kenai River Brown Bears; Won Div. Final series, 3-1 vs. Wisconsin Windigo; Lost Semifinal series, 0-2 vs. Oklahoma Warriors
2023–24	60	30	25	—	2	3	65	157	170	4th of 8 Midwest; 20th of 32, NAHL	Lost Div. Semifinal series, 1-3 Anchorage Wolverines
2024–25	59	30	25	—	4	0	64	210	197	5th of 8 Midwest; 19th of 35, NAHL	did not qualify
2025-26	59	42	12	-	3	2	89	249	148	1st of 8 Midwest; T-2nd of 35, NAHL	Won Div. Semifinals, 3-1 vs. Anchorage Wolverines; Won Div. Finals, 3-2 vs. Wisconsin Windigo; Won League Semifinals, 2-0 vs. Austin Bruins; Lost Robertson Cup Championship, 2-3(OT) vs. Maryland Black Bears
