= 2020–21 NAHL season =

- League: North American Hockey League
- Sport: Ice hockey
- Duration: Regular season October 9, 2020 – May 16, 2021; Postseason; May 21 – June 22, 2021
- Games: 60–48
- Teams: 23

Regular season
- Season champions: Aberdeen Wings
- Season MVP: Jake Sibell (Aberdeen Wings)
- Top scorer: Payton Matsui (Aberdeen Wings)

Robertson Cup Playoffs
- Finals champions: Shreveport Mudbugs
- Runners-up: Aberdeen Wings

NAHL seasons
- ← 2019–20 2021–22 →

The 2020–21 NAHL season was the 37th season of the North American Hockey League. The regular season ran from October 2020 to May 2021 with an unbalanced schedule for the league. The Aberdeen Wings won the regular season championship and progressed all the way to the championship game where they were defeated 2–4 by the Shreveport Mudbugs who captured the Robertson Cup.

== COVID-19 ==
Due to the ongoing COVID-19 pandemic, the NAHL and its member teams were forced to adjust their plans several times during the season. A few of the existing teams chose to suspend play for the year while some expansion franchises elected to delay their start until the following season. The league initially planned on starting the season on time in September, however, the NAHL decided to push back the first game until early October. After the season was already underway, the league then had to halt play for the entire Midwest division for over a month due to public health orders from the state of Minnesota. Despite the setbacks, the league was able to play most of its scheduled matches and hold a full postseason tournament.

== Member changes ==
- On October 15, 2019, the Wichita Falls Warriors, were accepted as an expansion franchise for this season.
- In late February 2020, the Topeka Pilots announced that they would be moving to Kansas City, Missouri for the following season. The team later announced that they would become the Kansas City Scouts, taking the same name as a defunct NHL team. However, by August the team had decided that not only would they be unable to play during this season due to COVID restrictions, but they would also have to sit out the following year as they had yet to find a stable home venue. Eventually, the team moved to Amarillo, Texas in the summer of 2021.
- After the season had been suspended due to the pandemic, the St. Cloud Blizzard formally changed their name to the St. Cloud Norsemen.
- Less than a week later, the NAHL approved the sale and relocation of the Wilkes-Barre/Scranton Knights. The franchise would take up residence in Danbury, Connecticut and take a similar name as its new patron, becoming the Danbury Jr. Hat Tricks.
- In late August, the Fairbanks Ice Dogs and Kenai River Brown Bears took up residence in Minnesota due to quarantine and testing regulations that would have made travel between Alaska and Minnesota logistically impossible. At the same time, the New Mexico Ice Wolves announced their move to Texas for the same reason. Once policies had been relaxed in April, all three teams were able to return to their home sites and finish out the remainder of their seasons at home.
- Due to similar COVID restrictions issued in other states, the Corpus Christi IceRays, Springfield Jr. Blues and Jamestown Rebels each suspended play for the 2020-21 season. Each was expected to resume play the following year.

== Regular season ==
The standings at the end of the regular season were as follows:

Note: x = clinched playoff berth; y = clinched division title; z = clinched regular season title

=== Standings ===
==== Central Division ====
Team	GP	W	L	OTL	SOL	Pts	GF	GA
xyz – Aberdeen Wings	56	51	4	0	1	103	251	75
x – Bismarck Bobcats	56	29	21	3	3	64	173	151
x – Minnesota Wilderness	56	25	27	1	3	54	136	168
x – Minot Minotauros	56	23	25	6	2	54	150	199
Austin Bruins	56	22	26	5	3	52	159	187
St. Cloud Norsemen	56	22	33	0	1	45	151	206

==== East Division ====
Team	GP	W	L	OTL	SOL	Pts	GF	GA
xy – Johnstown Tomahawks	54	39	10	2	3	83	220	144
x – Maine Nordiques	56	35	19	2	0	72	169	163
x – New Jersey Titans	54	27	20	2	5	61	197	174
x – Maryland Black Bears	54	25	21	6	2	58	146	159
Northeast Generals	60	20	32	6	2	48	164	217
Danbury Jr. Hat Tricks	54	20	27	6	1	47	148	187

==== Midwest Division ====
Team	GP	W	L	OTL	SOL	Pts	GF	GA
xy – Janesville Jets	48	31	13	4	0	66	183	144
x – Fairbanks Ice Dogs	48	25	19	2	2	54	165	163
x – Minnesota Magicians	48	24	21	3	0	51	144	153
x – Kenai River Brown Bears	48	22	24	1	1	46	155	168
Chippewa Steel	48	14	29	2	3	33	116	169

==== South Division ====
Team	GP	W	L	OTL	SOL	Pts	GF	GA
xy – Shreveport Mudbugs	56	38	11	2	5	83	205	139
x – Lone Star Brahmas	56	38	16	2	0	78	172	132
x – Wichita Falls Warriors	56	30	19	1	6	67	171	161
x – Amarillo Bulls	56	29	18	3	6	67	159	166
New Mexico Ice Wolves	56	21	30	3	2	47	147	184
Odessa Jackalopes	56	12	36	4	4	32	117	190

=== Statistics ===
==== Scoring leaders ====
The following players led the league in regular season points at the completion of all regular season games.

Player	Team	GP	G	A	Pts	PIM
Payton Matsui	Aberdeen Wings	56	27	38	65	18
Jay Ahearn	Johnstown Tomahawks	52	31	31	62	71
Clayton Cosentino	Aberdeen Wings	56	12	48	60	25
Cole Hanson	New Mexico Ice Wolves	53	21	39	60	34
Braiden Dorfman	Shreveport Mudbugs	55	21	38	59	22
Andrew DeCarlo	Lone Star Brahmas	54	22	35	57	61
Brendan Clark	Johnstown Tomahawks	51	18	37	55	81
John Gelatt	Johnstown Tomahawks	51	24	30	54	34
Nicholas Niemo	Lone Star Brahmas	52	17	36	53	35
Thomas Manty	Aberdeen Wings	55	25	28	53	26

==== Leading goaltenders ====
Note: GP = Games played; Mins = Minutes played; W = Wins; L = Losses; OTL = Overtime losses; SOL = Shootout losses; SO = Shutouts; GAA = Goals against average; SV% = Save percentage

Player	Team	GP	Mins	W	L	OTL	SOL	SO	SV%	GAA
Jake Sibell	Aberdeen Wings	47	2826:31	43	2	0	1	11	.952	1.19
Cole Hudson	Shreveport Mudbugs	32	1941:11	20	6	3	2	2	.923	2.13
Arsenii Sergeev	Shreveport Mudbugs	20	1206:09	14	4	0	2	2	.936	2.14
Salvatore Evola	Johnstown Tomahawks	27	1588:18	18	6	2	0	3	.924	2.15
Josh Graziano	New Mexico/Johnstown	21	1252:36	13	4	0	3	1	.931	2.16
Graham Burke	Lone Star Brahmas	37	2001:34	23	9	0	0	1	.917	2.16

== Robertson Cup playoffs ==
Teams are reseeded prior to the semifinal round based upon regular season records.

Division Semifinals (Best-of-5)
C1	Aberdeen Wings	3	4	2	2	4*
C4	Minot Minotauros	1	3	3**	4	3
Central Division
C2	Bismarck Bobcats	5	6	5	-	-
C3	Minnesota Wilderness	3	3	4	-	-
E1	Johnstown Tomahawks	5	4	2	4	3
E4	Maryland Black Bears	3	6	3	2	4
East Division
E2	Maine Nordiques	1	1	3	0	5
E3	New Jersey Titans	0	4	2	3	3
MW1	Janesville Jets	4	1	6	3	-
MW4	Kenai River Brown Bears	6	5	1	4	-
Midwest Division
MW2	Fairbanks Ice Dogs	3	2	2	-	-
MW3	Minnesota Magicians	6	7	3	-	-
S1	Shreveport Mudbugs	1	2*	3*	3	-
S4	Amarillo Bulls	4	1	2	2	-
South Division
S2	Lone Star Brahmas	2	3	1	-	-
S3	Wichita Falls Warriors	4	5	2	-	-

Division Finals (Best-of-5)
C1	Aberdeen Wings	5	4	3	-	-
C2	Bismarck Bobcats	3	1	1	-	-
E4	Maryland Black Bears	1	1	1	-	-
E2	Maine Nordiques	4	4	4	-	-
MW4	Kenai River Brown Bears	2	2	2	4	2
MW3	Minnesota Magicians	3	7	0	1	3
S1	Shreveport Mudbugs	4	2	4	-	-
S3	Wichita Falls Warriors	3	0	2	-	-

Semifinal (Best-of-3)
1	Aberdeen Wings	5	2	-
4	Minnesota Magicians	1	1	-
2	Shreveport Mudbugs	4	5	-
3	Maine Nordiques	1	1	-

Championship (Best-of-1)
1	Aberdeen Wings	2
2	Shreveport Mudbugs	4

Note: * denotes overtime period(s)
