= 2021–22 NAHL season =

- League: North American Hockey League
- Sport: Ice hockey
- Duration: Regular season September 8, 2021 – April 18, 2022; Postseason; April 21 – May 24, 2022
- Games: 60
- Teams: 29

Regular season
- Season champions: Lone Star Brahmas
- Season MVP: Ryan O'Neill (St. Cloud Norsemen)
- Top scorer: Ryan O'Neill (St. Cloud Norsemen)

Robertson Cup Playoffs
- Finals champions: New Jersey Titans
- Runners-up: Anchorage Wolverines

NAHL seasons
- ← 2020–21 2022–23 →

The 2021–22 NAHL season was the 38th season of the North American Hockey League. The regular season ran from September 2021 to April 2022 with a 60-game schedule for each team. The Lone Star Brahmas won the regular season championship. The New Jersey Titans defeated the Anchorage Wolverines 3–0 in the Championship game to capture the Robertson Cup.

== Member changes ==
- The El Paso Rhinos, which had joined the NA3HL in 2020, founded a tier II club that began play this season.
- The Corpus Christi IceRays, Springfield Jr. Blues and Jamestown Rebels, who had each suspended play for the 2020-21 season due to the COVID-19 pandemic, resumed play this year.
- On March 5, 2021, the NAHL approved the relocation of the Amarillo Bulls to Mason City, Iowa where they became the North Iowa Bulls. In the wake of their departure, the Kansas City Scouts announced that they would be moving to Amarillo, Texas and take up residence in the Amarillo Civic Center, becoming the Amarillo Wranglers in the process. While the NAHL was planning on returning to Kansas City for the 2022–23 season, those plans were eventually put on hold.
- Also in March of 2021, the Anchorage Wolverines were admitted as an expansion franchise for this season.

== Regular season ==
The standings at the end of the regular season were as follows:

Note: x = clinched playoff berth; y = clinched division title; z = clinched regular season title

=== Standings ===
==== Central Division ====
Team	GP	W	L	OTL	SOL	Pts	GF	GA
xy – St. Cloud Norsemen	60	41	16	2	1	85	230	153
x – Austin Bruins	60	31	23	3	3	68	178	186
x – Aberdeen Wings	60	31	24	3	2	67	186	184
x – Bismarck Bobcats	60	29	27	1	3	62	210	206
Minot Minotauros	60	28	29	2	1	59	173	184
North Iowa Bulls	60	22	28	4	6	54	194	234

==== East Division ====
Team	GP	W	L	OTL	SOL	Pts	GF	GA
xy – New Jersey Titans	60	41	16	3	0	85	226	163
x – Johnstown Tomahawks	60	34	20	4	2	74	225	184
x – Jamestown Rebels	60	35	22	2	1	73	181	164
x – Northeast Generals	60	35	24	0	1	71	199	200
Maryland Black Bears	60	29	19	6	6	70	189	176
Maine Nordiques	60	22	27	6	5	55	200	243
Danbury Jr. Hat Tricks	60	12	42	5	1	30	153	258

==== Midwest Division ====
Team	GP	W	L	OTL	SOL	Pts	GF	GA
xy – Fairbanks Ice Dogs	60	37	20	1	2	77	238	179
x – Springfield Jr. Blues	60	36	20	2	2	76	211	177
x – Anchorage Wolverines	60	33	19	4	4	74	208	166
x – Minnesota Wilderness	60	35	23	1	1	72	216	203
Janesville Jets	60	34	25	0	1	69	227	208
Minnesota Magicians	60	25	26	6	3	59	197	231
Chippewa Steel	60	25	31	2	2	54	168	206
Kenai River Brown Bears	60	14	41	3	2	33	147	256

==== South Division ====
Team	GP	W	L	OTL	SOL	Pts	GF	GA
xyz – Lone Star Brahmas	60	38	12	5	5	86	197	144
x – New Mexico Ice Wolves	60	38	17	2	3	81	193	145
x – Wichita Falls Warriors	60	35	17	5	3	78	220	150
x – Shreveport Mudbugs	60	34	31	1	4	73	170	154
Odessa Jackalopes	60	29	26	1	4	63	193	193
Amarillo Wranglers	60	27	29	1	3	58	149	182
Corpus Christi IceRays	60	25	32	2	1	53	166	213
El Paso Rhinos	60	15	41	2	2	34	131	233

=== Statistics ===
==== Scoring leaders ====
The following players led the league in regular season points at the completion of all regular season games.

Player	Team	GP	G	A	Pts	PIM
Ryan O'Neill	St. Cloud Norsemen	57	30	50	80	6
Jake Black	Johnstown Tomahawks	60	41	38	79	36
Cy LeClerc	Janesville Jets	60	31	46	77	8
Cade Neilson	Aberdeen Wings	58	26	49	75	88
Alexander Malinowski	Fairbanks Ice Dogs	58	33	42	75	25
Cole Dubicki	Springfield Jr. Blues	64	22	52	74	56
Nicholas Niemo	Lone Star Brahmas	60	38	36	74	55
Kristaps Skrastins	Amarillo Wranglers	58	36	34	70	109
Artur Turansky	Lone Star Brahmas	60	28	38	66	46
Paul Minnehan	Northeast Generals	57	23	41	64	31
Dillan Bentley	New Mexico Ice Wolves	58	30	34	64	38

==== Leading goaltenders ====
Note: GP = Games played; Mins = Minutes played; W = Wins; L = Losses; OTL = Overtime losses; SOL = Shootout losses; SO = Shutouts; GAA = Goals against average; SV% = Save percentage

Player	Team	GP	Mins	W	L	OTL	SOL	GA	SV	SV%	GAA
Arthur Smith	Lone Star Brahmas	34	2012:37	23	3	2	4	63	699	.910	1.88
Matthew Smith	Springfield Jr. Blues	20	1108:39	15	2	0	1	36	483	.926	1.95
Devon Bobak	Shreveport Mudbugs	42	2531:42	27	11	1	3	86	1,098	.922	2.04
Béni Halász	New Mexico Ice Wolves	43	2578:36	26	13	0	3	91	1,147	.921	2.12
Nolan Suggs	Jamestown Rebels	39	2284:41	25	10	2	0	85	1,183	.928	2.23

== Robertson Cup playoffs ==
Teams are reseeded prior to the semifinal round based upon regular season records.

Division Semifinals (Best-of-5)
C1	St. Cloud Norsemen	4	1	3*	1	3
C4	Bismarck Bobcats	1	2**	2	2	2
Central Division
C2	Austin Bruins	2	2	3	-	-
C3	Aberdeen Wings	4	3	6	-	-
E1	New Jersey Titans	1	6	3	2	5
E4	Northeast Generals	4	2	0	4	4
East Division
E2	Johnstown Tomahawks	1	5*	1	3	3
E3	Jamestown Rebels	4	4	2**	1	4*
MW1	Fairbanks Ice Dogs	3*	7	1	0	1
MW4	Minnesota Wilderness	2	1	4	3	5
Midwest Division
MW2	Springfield Jr. Blues	1	1	3	-	-
MW3	Anchorage Wolverines	2	2	4*	-	-
S1	Lone Star Brahmas	1	3	1	4*	-
S4	Shreveport Mudbugs	0	2	4	3	-
South Division
S2	New Mexico Ice Wolves	1	5***	3	2	4
S3	Wichita Falls Warriors	2*	4	4	1	2

Division Finals (Best-of-5)
C1	St. Cloud Norsemen	4	6	3***	3	-
C3	Aberdeen Wings	5*	2	2	2	-
E1	New Jersey Titans	2	3	4	3***	-
E3	Jamestown Rebels	6	2	1	2	-
MW4	Minnesota Wilderness	1	7	3	1	-
MW3	Anchorage Wolverines	4	2	4**	5	-
S1	Lone Star Brahmas	2	4	0	3	0
S2	New Mexico Ice Wolves	0	2	3	4*	1

Semifinal (Best-of-3)
1	St. Cloud Norsemen	1	2	-
4	Anchorage Wolverines	2	6	-
2	New Jersey Titans	1	3*	4**
3	New Mexico Ice Wolves	3	2	3

Championship (Best-of-1)
4	Anchorage Wolverines	0
2	New Jersey Titans	3

Note: * denotes overtime period(s)
