= Rochester Jr. Americans =

- City: Fairport, New York, United States
- League: North American Hockey League
- Division: East
- Founded: 1996 & 2023
- Home arena: Rochester Ice Center
- Colors: Blue, white and red
- Owners: Hockey ROCS, LLC Chris O’Donnell and Colleen Wegman
- General manager: John Humphrey
- Head coach: François Méthot

Franchise history
- 1st Creation
- 1996–1998: Syracuse Jr. Crunch
- 1998–1999: Auburn Jr. Crunch
- 1999–2005: Syracuse Jr. Crunch
- 2005–2010: Syracuse Stars
- 2010–2013: Rochester Stars
- 2013–2016: Rochester Jr. Americans - USPHL
- 2nd Creation
- 2023–2026: Rochester Jr. Americans - NAHL

The Rochester Jr. Americans are an inactive Tier II Junior ice hockey team from Rochester, New York. Junior team returned to Rochester with the North American Hockey League accepting the location as an expansion franchise starting in the 2023-24 season.

== History ==
In 1996, the Syracuse Junior Crunch were founded to play Canadian Junior A in the Metro Junior A Hockey League, which was absorbed by the Ontario Provincial Junior A Hockey League in 1998. The team moved to Auburn that year, and was renamed the Auburn Junior Crunch. In 2005 the franchise was sold and renamed the Syracuse Stars, joining the American Tier III Junior A Eastern Junior Hockey League (EJHL). While they played in Syracuse, they also had a Junior B team in the Empire Junior Hockey League (EmJHL).

On December 9, 2009, Maksymum Hockey LLC, based in Rochester, New York, announced plans to operate the Stars and move them to Rochester beginning with the 2010–11 season. During this time they were called the Rochester Stars and were affiliated with the Tier III Junior B Maksymum Junior Hockey Club in the (EmJHL) and were no longer affiliated with the Junior B Syracuse Stars that continued to play in the EmJHL. The Rochester Stars began playing at the Bill Gray's Regional Iceplex.

In 2013, the EJHL dissolved after several members left to form the United States Premier Hockey League. By the beginning of the 2013–14 season, the Stars joined the USPHL in the Elite and Empire Divisions (with the former EJHL team in Elite and the former EmJHL team in the Empire). Both teams were renamed to the Rochester Jr. Americans.

In 2014, the Jr. Americans promoted their Elite Division Tier III team to the USPHL's Premier Division for the 2014–15 season and began playing against many of the former EJHL members. For the 2015–16 season they switched their team from the Empire Division (recently renamed USP3 Division) to the Elite Division. In 2016, the USPHL removed the Jr. Americans from the league and announced a new organization called the Rochester Jr. Monarchs would take their place in the Elite and youth divisions.

In 2020, Perinton Youth Hockey reached an agreement to form an official partnership with the Rochester Americans and restart the Jr. Americans program. Junior team from various age groups began the next season all under the new banner. For the 2023-24 hockey season, Rochester added a Tier-II club when the North American Hockey League (NAHL) announcement that its Board of Governors has approved the membership application for a team in Rochester, New York owned by Hockey ROCS, LLC, an entity owned and operated by Chris O’Donnell and Colleen Wegman.

On June 5, 2026, the Jr. Americans announced they would not participate in the 2026–27 NAHL season.

== Season-by-season records 1996-2016 ==
Crunch - Stars - Jr. American Records
Season	GP	W	L	T	OTL	P	GF	GA	Regular season finish	Playoffs
Syracuse Jr. Crunch
1996–97	50	10	37	3	—	23	220	358	15th Metro A	did not qualify
1997–98	49	29	16	4	—	62	273	219	4th Metro A	Won First Round, 3–2 vs. Pickering Panthers; Won Quarterfinals, 3–1 vs. Thornhill Rattlers; Lost Semifinals, 3–4 vs. Caledon Canadians
Auburn Jr. Crunch
1998–99	51	27	22	2	0	56	232	195	6th of 13, OPJHL-East	Lost Div. Quarterfinals, 0–3 vs. Lindsay Muskies
Syracuse Jr. Crunch
1999–2000	49	9	36	2	2	22	170	303	10th of 10, OPJHL-East	did not qualify
2000–01	49	20	24	4	1	45	195	234	8th of 10, OPJHL-East	Lost Div. Quarterfinals, 0–4 vs. Lindsay Muskies
2001–02	49	20	24	5	0	45	187	226	6th of 10, OPJHL-East	Lost Div. Quarterfinals, 0–4 vs. Trenton Sting
2002–03	49	4	43	1	1	10	114	308	10th of 10, OPJHL-East	did not qualify
2003–04	49	20	26	0	3	43	192	223	7th of 10, OPJHL-East	Lost Div. Quarterfinals, 0–4 vs. Bowmanville Eagles
2004–05	49	8	35	3	3	22	158	267	9th of 10, OPJHL-East	Lost Div. Quarterfinals, 1–4 vs. Aurora Tigers
Syracuse Stars
2005–06	45	11	27	1	6	29	127	208	6th of 7, North; 13th of 14, EJHL	did not qualify
2006–07	45	19	18	3	5	46	155	175	5th of 7, North; 8th of 14, EJHL	did not qualify
2007–08	45	30	9	5	1	66	155	120	2nd of 7, North; 3rd of 14, EJHL	Lost Quarterfinal South Shore Kings
2008–09	45	24	14	6	1	55	184	160	3rd of 7, North; 4th of 14, EJHL	Lost Quarterfinal vs. Bridgewater Bandits
2009–10	45	22	15	3	5	52	173	163	3rd of 7, North; 6th of 14, EJHL	Lost Quarterfinals, 0–2 vs. Jersey Hitmen
Rochester Stars
2010–11	45	13	29	3	0	29	109	173	5th of 7, North; 12th of 14, EJHL	did not qualify
2011–12	45	15	26	—	4	34	103	156	6th of 7, North; 12th of 14, EJHL	Lost First Round, 0–2 vs. Bay State Breakers
2012–13	45	24	15	—	6	54	150	140	4th of 7, North; 6th of 14, EJHL	Won First Round, 1–1 vs. New York Apple Core; Lost Quarterfinals vs. Islanders Hockey Club
Rochester Jr. Americans
2013–14	42	36	4	—	2	74	217	80	1st of 10, North; 1st of 18, USPHL Elite	Won First Round, 2–0 vs. Portland Jr. Pirates (Elite); Lost Quarterfinals, 1–2 vs. Jersey Hitmen (Elite)
2014–15	50	22	25	—	3	47	170	175	8th of 11; USPHL Premier	Lost Quarterfinals, 0–2 vs. Jersey Hitmen
2015–16	44	13	28	—	3	29	128	183	9th of 12; USPHL Premier	Won Play-in Game, 3–1 vs. Syracuse Stars; Lost Quarterfinals, 0–2 vs. Islanders Hockey Club

== Season-by-season records 2023 - 2026 ==
Season	GP	W	L	OTL	P	GF	GA	Regular season finish	Playoffs
Rochester Jr. Americans of the NAHL
2023–24	60	34	18	8	76	213	177	3rd of 9, East; 10th of 32, NAHL	Won Div. Play-In series, 2–0 (Northeast Generals); Lost Div. Semifinal series, 2–3 (Maine Nordiques)
2024–25	59	39	12	8	86	242	121	1st of 10, East; 6th of 35, NAHL	Won Div. Semifinal series, 2–1 (Johnstown Tomahawks); Won Div. Final series, 3–1 (Maine Nordiques); Lost Robertson Cup Semifinal series, 1–2 (Bismarck Bobcats)
2025–26	59	37	21	1	75	210	159	2nd of 10, East; 7th of 34, NAHL	Won Div. Semifinal series, 3-2 (Northeast Generals); Lost Div. Final series, 1-3 (Maryland Black Bears)

== Alumni ==
In addition to those players which have gone on to play for various college teams, a number of former Stars players have gone on to play at the NHL level, including the following:

- Ryan Callahan of the Tampa Bay Lightning
- Tim Connolly
- Colby Cohen
- Jeremy Morin of the Tampa Bay Lightning
- Matt Murley
- Rob Schremp
- Tim Sestito
- Tom Sestito
- Tom Aubrun

== Former logos ==
Syracuse Jr. Crunch

Syracuse Stars

Rochester Jr. Americans (2013-2016)
