= Oklahoma Warriors =

- City: Oklahoma City, Oklahoma
- League: NAHL
- Division: South
- Founded: 2019
- Home arena: Blazers Ice Centre
- Colors: Black, orange, heather gray
- Owner: George Chalos
- General manager: Eric Ballard
- Head coach: Eric Ballard
- Affiliates: Oklahoma City Warriors (NA3HL) and Long Beach Sharks (NA3HL)

Franchise history
- 2020–2022: Wichita Falls Warriors
- 2022–present: Oklahoma Warriors

Championships
- Regular season titles: 1 (2022–23)
- Division titles: 1 (2022–23)
- Robertson Cups: 1 (2022–23)

The Oklahoma Warriors are a Tier II junior ice hockey team in the North American Hockey League's South Division. The Warriors play their home games at Blazers Ice Centre in Oklahoma City, Oklahoma.

== History ==
On October 15, 2019, the North American Hockey League (NAHL) announced that they had approved the membership application submitted by Robbie Hockey LLC, an entity owned and operated by Mary Anne Choi for a team in Wichita Falls, Texas, and that the team would start play in the 2020–21 season as a member of the South Division. On November 26, 2019, the name Warriors name was selected out of Warriors, Flames, Reign, and Falcons via a name-the-team contest. On April 14, 2020, the Warriors announced their inaugural head coach as Garrett Roth, a former assistant coach with the Bismarck Bobcats and Aberdeen Wings.

On April 4, 2022, the Warriors and city of Wichita Falls mutually agreed to part ways at the end of the 2021–22 season. The Warriors then relocated to the Blazers Ice Centre in Oklahoma City, Oklahoma, for the 2022–23 season.

Team owner Mary Ann Choi died suddenly during a game on Nov. 19, 2023.

On May 2, 2024, the Janesville Jets announced that Warriors Head Coach Garrett Roth had signed a three-year contract to serve as the Jets' Head Coach and General Manager.

== Season-by-season records ==
Season	GP	W	L	OTL	SOL	Pts	GF	GA	Finish	Playoffs
Wichita Falls Warriors
2020–21	56	30	19	1	6	67	171	161	3rd of 6, South Div. 6th of 23, NAHL	Won Div. Semifinals, 3–0 vs. Lone Star Brahmas; Lost Div. Finals, 0–3 vs. Shreveport Mudbugs
2021–22	60	35	17	5	3	68	220	158	3rd of 8, South Div. 5th of 29, NAHL	Lost Div. Semifinals, 2–3 vs. New Mexico Ice Wolves
Oklahoma Warriors
2022–23	60	44	14	1	1	90	253	139	1st of 8, South Div. 1st of 29, NAHL	Won Div. Semifinals, 3–0 vs. Amarillo Wranglers; Won Div. Finals, 3–0 vs. Shreveport Mudbugs; Won Robertson Cup Semifinals 2–0 vs. Minnesota Wilderness; Won Robertson Cup Championship, 4–3 vs. Austin Bruins
2023–24	60	31	22	5	2	69	187	169	6th of 8, South; 16th of 32, NAHL	Lost Play-In Series, 1-2 vs. El Paso Rhinos
2024–25	59	16	33	7	3	42	137	220	9th of 9, South; 33rd of 35, NAHL	Did Not Qualify
2025-26	59	29	26	2	5	59	195	208	6th of 8, South; 22nd of 34, NAHL	Lost Play-In Series, 1-2 vs. El Paso Rhinos
