= 2022–23 NAHL season =

- League: North American Hockey League
- Sport: Ice hockey
- Duration: Regular season September 9, 2022 – April 15, 2023; Postseason; April 21 – May 21, 2023
- Games: 60
- Teams: 29

Draft
- Top draft pick: Jacob Lavallée
- Picked by: Danbury Jr. Hat Tricks

Regular season
- Season champions: Oklahoma Warriors
- Season MVP: Joey DelGreco (Oklahoma Warriors)
- Top scorer: David Andreychuk (Northeast Generals)

Robertson Cup Playoffs
- Robertson Cup Playoffs MVP: Brendan Williams (Warriors)
- Finals champions: Oklahoma Warriors
- Runners-up: Austin Bruins

NAHL seasons
- ← 2021–22 2023–24 →

The 2022–23 NAHL season was the 39th season of the North American Hockey League. The regular season ran from September 2022 to April 2023 with a 60-game schedule for each team. The Oklahoma Warriors won the regular season championship and went on to defeat the Austin Bruins 4–3 in the Championship game to capture the Robertson Cup.

== Member changes ==
- The NAHL approved the sale of the Minnesota Magicians on March 16, 2022. The franchise was moved to Eagle River, Wisconsin and became the Wisconsin Windigo.
- By mutual agreement, the Wichita Falls Warriors left their home in Wichita Falls, Texas. The franchise relocated to Oklahoma City, Oklahoma and became the Oklahoma Warriors.
- After 4 years in Jamestown, New York, the Jamestown Rebels moved back to Philadelphia and changed their name back to the Philadelphia Rebels.

== Regular season ==
The standings at the end of the regular season were as follows:

Note: x = clinched playoff berth; y = clinched division title; z = clinched regular season title

=== Standings ===
==== Central Division ====
Team	GP	W	L	OTL	SOL	Pts	GF	GA
xy – Austin Bruins	60	34	16	3	7	78	187	151
x – Aberdeen Wings	60	30	24	3	3	66	176	177
x – St. Cloud Norsemen	60	28	23	4	5	65	163	184
x – Minot Minotauros	60	31	27	1	1	64	180	189
Bismarck Bobcats	60	29	25	4	2	64	197	182
North Iowa Bulls	60	29	27	3	1	62	167	179

==== East Division ====
Team	GP	W	L	OTL	SOL	Pts	GF	GA
xy – Maryland Black Bears	60	40	15	4	1	85	215	140
x – New Jersey Titans	60	38	18	2	2	80	212	167
x – Maine Nordiques	60	33	24	2	1	69	208	188
x – Northeast Generals	60	30	25	4	1	65	190	191
Johnstown Tomahawks	60	29	26	4	1	63	189	211
Philadelphia Rebels	60	27	30	2	1	57	166	181
Danbury Jr. Hat Tricks	60	6	47	5	2	19	102	246

==== Midwest Division ====
Team	GP	W	L	OTL	SOL	Pts	GF	GA
xy – Wisconsin Windigo	60	39	18	1	2	81	210	147
x – Minnesota Wilderness	60	35	18	3	4	77	168	146
x – Kenai River Brown Bears	60	32	24	3	1	68	170	185
x – Chippewa Steel	60	31	25	1	3	66	186	172
Anchorage Wolverines	60	28	24	6	2	64	186	172
Fairbanks Ice Dogs	60	28	25	6	1	63	181	196
Springfield Jr. Blues	60	26	31	1	2	55	147	174
Janesville Jets	60	23	28	5	4	55	167	180

==== South Division ====
Team	GP	W	L	OTL	SOL	Pts	GF	GA
xyz – Oklahoma Warriors	60	44	14	1	1	90	253	139
x – Lone Star Brahmas	60	37	15	3	5	82	155	126
x – Shreveport Mudbugs	60	37	16	2	5	81	183	135
x – Amarillo Wranglers	60	34	23	2	1	71	183	154
New Mexico Ice Wolves	60	33	23	3	1	70	195	170
Odessa Jackalopes	60	30	29	1	2	63	174	199
El Paso Rhinos	60	18	38	3	1	40	111	201
Corpus Christi IceRays	60	11	42	6	1	29	140	255

=== Statistics ===
==== Scoring leaders ====
The following players led the league in regular season points at the completion of all regular season games.

Player	Team	GP	G	A	Pts	PIM
David Andreychuk	Northeast Generals	60	18	57	75	68
Hunter Longhi	Minot Minotauros	58	22	49	71	26
Joey DelGreco	Oklahoma Warriors	60	22	47	69	24
Paul Minnehan	Northeast Generals	48	26	40	66	28
Jackson Reineke	Anchorage Wolverines	59	32	34	66	122
Drew Sutton	Oklahoma Warriors	60	24	40	64	6
Aiden Westin	Anchorage Wolverines	56	27	37	64	84
Gavin Morrissey	Austin Bruins	59	17	44	61	26
Kevin Marx Norén	Fairbanks/Minnesota	58	34	26	60	27
Michael Young	New Jersey Titans	50	29	31	60	16

==== Leading goaltenders ====
Note: GP = Games played; Mins = Minutes played; W = Wins; L = Losses; OTL = Overtime losses; SOL = Shootout losses; SO = Shutouts; GAA = Goals against average; SV% = Save percentage

Player	Team	GP	Mins	W	L	OTL	SOL	GA	SV	SV%	GAA
Arthur Smith	Lone Star Brahmas	33	1772:43	18	6	1	3	46	643	.929	1.56
Simon Bucheler	Shreveport Mudbugs	41	2279:49	28	7	2	0	73	928	.921	1.92
William Gramme	Lone Star Brahmas	34	1822:45	19	9	3	1	60	737	.919	1.98
Gavin Moffatt	Wisconsin Windigo	30	1850:42	21	7	0	2	61	984	.938	1.98
Trent Wiemken	Austin Bruins	32	1758:21	18	6	2	3	60	720	.917	2.05

== Robertson Cup playoffs ==
Teams are reseeded prior to the semifinal round based upon regular season records.

Division Semifinals (Best-of-5)
C1	Austin Bruins	4*	4	3	-	-
C4	Minot Minotauros	3	2	0	-	-
Central Division
C2	Aberdeen Wings	1	0	0	-	-
C3	St. Cloud Norsemen	2	2	3	-	-
E1	Maryland Black Bears	8	3*	3	-	-
E4	Northeast Generals	2	2	1	-	-
East Division
E2	New Jersey Titans	0	5	1	-	-
E3	Maine Nordiques	3	6*	5	-	-
MW1	Wisconsin Windigo	4	2*	4	-	-
MW4	Chippewa Steel	1	1	2	-	-
Midwest Division
MW2	Minnesota Wilderness	3	2	2*	-	-
MW3	Kenai River Brown Bears	1	1	1	-	-
S1	Oklahoma Warriors	5	6	4*	-	-
S4	Amarillo Wranglers	2	2	3	-	-
South Division
S2	Lone Star Brahmas	2****	2	2	2	0
S3	Shreveport Mudbugs	1	3*	0	3*	1

Division Finals (Best-of-5)
C1	Austin Bruins	3	6	5	2*	-
C3	St. Cloud Norsemen	4*	1	1	1	-
E1	Maryland Black Bears	4	5	4	8	-
E3	Maine Nordiques	2	1	5	4	-
MW1	Wisconsin Windigo	0	3*	1	3	-
MW2	Minnesota Wilderness	1	2	5	5	-
S1	Oklahoma Warriors	4	5	2**	-	-
S3	Shreveport Mudbugs	1	1	1	-	-

Semifinal (Best-of-3)
1	Oklahoma Warriors	4	3	-
4	Minnesota Wilderness	2	1	-
2	Maryland Black Bears	0	2	2
3	Austin Bruins	4	1	4

Championship (Best-of-1)
1	Oklahoma Warriors	4
3	Austin Bruins	3

Note: * denotes overtime period(s)

== Division Semifinals ==
=== (C1) Austin Bruins vs. (C4) Minot Minotauros ===
April 21	Austin Bruins	4 – 3	OT	Minot Minotauros	Riverside Arena

April 22	Austin Bruins	4 – 2	Minot Minotauros	Riverside Arena

April 28	Minot Minotauros	0 – 3	Austin Bruins	Maysa Arena

Austin wins series 3 – 0
