= Wisconsin Windigo =

- City: Brookfield, Wisconsin
- League: North American Hockey League
- Division: Midwest
- Founded: 2010
- Home arena: The Ponds of Brookfield
- Colors: Blue, black, and grey
- Owners: District 5 Sports Group Hockey Club, LLC
- General manager: Chris Hedlund
- Head coach: John Mitchell (Hired 2024)

Franchise history
- 2010–2012: New Mexico Mustangs
- 2013–2022: Minnesota Magicians
- 2022–present: Wisconsin Windigo

The Wisconsin Windigo are a Tier II junior ice hockey team in the North American Hockey League's Midwest Division. Based in Brookfield, Wisconsin, the Windigo play their home games at The Ponds of Brookfield.

== History ==
The team announced in March 2022 that it had been sold to Copper Island Hockey Club, LLC and would relocate to Eagle River, Wisconsin for the 2022–23 season. On May 3, the team was announced as the Wisconsin Windigo.

After three years in Eagle River, Wisconsin, the franchise was sold to Greg Copeland, Matt Roadhouse, and Tan Lo. The club relocated to Milwaukee-area and would use The Ponds of Brookfield as its new home.

== Season-by-season records ==
Season	GP	W	L	OTL	PTS	GF	GA	PIM	Finish	Playoffs
2022–23	60	39	18	3	81	210	147	829	1st of 8, Midwest; 4th of 29, NAHL	Won division semifinals, 3–0 vs Chippewa Steel; Lost division finals 1-3 vs Minnesota Wilderness
2023–24	60	39	15	6	84	224	146	929	2nd of 8, Midwest; 6th of 32, NAHL	Won Div. Semi-Finals, 3-0 vs. Janesville Jets; Lost Div. Finals, 0-3 vs. Anchorage Wolverines
2024–25	59	41	14	4	86	228	156	1033	1st of 8 Midwest; T-4th of 35, NAHL	Won Div. Semi-Finals, 3-1 vs. Chippewa Steel; Won Div. Finals 3-2 vs. Anchorage Wolverines; Lost Robertson Semifinal; 1-2 Lone Star Brahmas

== Coaches and staff ==
As of July 2024

- Head coach: John Mitchell
- GM: Chris Hedlund
- Assistant coaches: Bryce Reddick
- Owners: Copper Island Hockey Club, LLC - David Rowe – Co-owner and Managing Partner
- Vice President: Kevin Ingvalson
- Former owners: Ron Beran, Scott Krueger, Joe Pankratz
  Scott Meyer (2013–2018), A.J. Bucchino (2018–2021)
