= Janesville Jets =

- City: Janesville, Wisconsin
- League: North American Hockey League
- Division: Midwest
- Founded: 2009
- Home arena: Woodman's Center
- Colors: Navy blue, Vegas gold, light blue
- Owners: Wisconsin Hockey Partners, LLC (Bill McCoshen, Mark Cullen, David Cullen, Stephen B. King, William Kennedy, Tobin Ryan, & Joe Pavelski)
- General manager: Joe Dibble
- Head coach: Lawrence Childs
- Affiliates: Oregon Tradesmen (NA3HL)
- Website: Janesvillejets.com

Franchise history
- 2009–present: Janesville Jets

Championships
- Regular season titles: 1 (2015)
- Division titles: 3 (2015, 2017, 2021)

The Janesville Jets are a Tier II junior ice hockey team in the North American Hockey League. Based in Janesville, Wisconsin, their home games are played at the 1,500-seat Woodman's Center. Games were formerly held in the Janesville Ice Arena.

== History ==
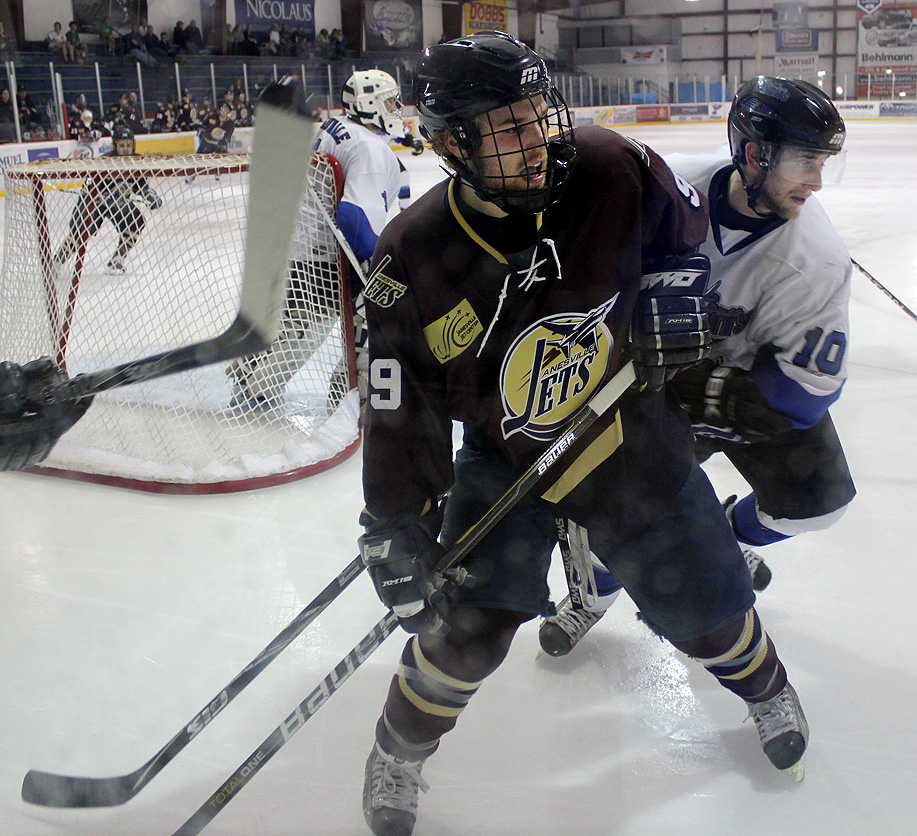
Jets in 2011.

The Jets name was chosen in a name-the-team contest in 2009. The name is the same as a previous Janesville hockey team that played in the former Continental Hockey League in the 1981–82 season.

The first home game of the 2010–11 season on October 9 was against the Chicago Hitmen. In the 2011–12 season, the Jets were moved from the North Division to a newly formed Midwest Division, along with the St. Louis Bandits and Springfield Jr. Blues.

The Jets unveiled new uniforms for the 2014–15 season, featuring a home gold jersey. In the regular season the Jets set NAHL records for total wins (49), total points (100), and fewest goals against (114). Forward Zach LaValle set the franchise record for individual scoring. In the postseason, the Jets defeated the Michigan Warriors and the Soo Eagles to capture the North Division title before losing to the eventual Robertson Cup champions, the Minnesota Wilderness.

In 2015, the NAHL's divisional realignment moved the Jets into the Midwest Division, joining the Fairbanks Ice Dogs, Kenai River Brown Bears, Minnesota Wilderness, Coulee Region Chill, and the Springfield Jr. Blues.

The Jets finished in second place in the Midwest Division in 2015–16. The team was defeated in the playoffs by the Minnesota Wilderness.

== Season-by-season records ==
Season	GP	W	L	OTL	PTS	GF	GA	PIM	Finish	Playoffs
2009–10	58	29	23	6	64	169	172	1,113	3rd of 5, Central; 11th of 19, NAHL	Lost Div. Semifinal series, 0–3 vs. Traverse City North Stars
2010–11	58	35	19	4	74	170	121	938	4th of 8, North; 8th of 26, NAHL	Lost Div. Semifinal series, 2–3 vs. St. Louis Bandits
2011–12	60	37	18	5	79	174	134	780	2nd of 5, Midwest t-8th of 28, NAHL	Lost Div. Semifinal series, 2–3 vs. Springfield Jr. Blues
2012–13	60	23	27	10	56	159	181	904	t-6th of 8, North t-16th of 24, NAHL	Did not qualify
2013–14	60	32	24	4	68	171	174	969	3rd of 6, North; 19th of 24, NAHL	Lost Div. Semifinal series, 2–3 vs. Michigan Warriors
2014–15	60	49	9	2	100	215	114	867	1st of 6, North; 1st of 24, NAHL	Won Div. Semifinal series, 3–0 vs. Michigan Warriors; Won Div. Final series, 3–1 vs. Soo Eagles; Lost Robertson Cup Semifinal series, 0–2 vs. Minnesota Wilderness
2015–16	60	35	18	7	77	181	150	810	2nd of 6, Midwest; 5th of 22, NAHL	Lost Div. Semifinal series, 1–3 vs. Minnesota Wilderness
2016–17	60	42	13	5	89	224	153	1059	1st of 6, Midwest; 3rd of 24, NAHL	Won Div. Semifinal series, 3–0 vs. Coulee Region Chill; Won Div. Final series, 3–1 vs. Fairbanks Ice Dogs; Lost Robertson Cup Semifinal series, 0–2 vs. Lone Star Brahmas
2017–18	60	38	13	9	85	181	140	856	2nd of 6, Midwest; 5th of 23, NAHL	Won Div. Semifinal series, 3–0 vs. Springfield Jr. Blues; Lost Div. Final series, 2–3 vs. Fairbanks Ice Dogs
2018–19	60	29	25	6	64	153	186	973	4th of 6, Midwest; 14th of 24, NAHL	Lost Div. Semifinal series, 0–3 vs. Fairbanks Ice Dogs
2019–20	52	24	26	2	50	149	181	670	5th of 6, Midwest; 17th of 26, NAHL	Postseason cancelled
2020–21	48	31	13	4	66	183	144	628	1st of 5, Midwest; 8th of 23, NAHL	Lost Div. Semifinal series, 1–3 vs. Kenai River Brown Bears
2021–22	60	34	25	1	69	227	208	789	5th of 8, Midwest; 15th of 29, NAHL	Did not qualify
2022–23	60	23	28	9	55	167	180	875	8th of 8, Midwest; 26th of 29, NAHL	Did not qualify
2023–24	60	33	22	5	71	235	194	890	3rd of 8 Midwest; 15 of 32 NAHL	Lost Div. Semifinal series, 0-3 vs. Wisconsin Windigo
2024–25	59	17	36	6	40	144	230	962	8th of 8 Midwest; 34 of 35 NAHL	Did not qualify

== Janesville Jets (1981–82) ==
The Janesville Jets were also a hockey team that played in the Continental Hockey League (CnHL) in 1981–82.
