= New Mexico Ice Wolves =

- City: Albuquerque, New Mexico
- League: North American Hockey League
- Division: South
- Founded: 2019
- Home arena: Outpost Ice Arenas
- Colors: Yellow, red, turquoise
- Owners: Desert Ice Investment, LLC
- Head coach: Kevin Hartzell
- Affiliates: New Mexico Ice Wolves (NA3HL)

Franchise history
- 2019–present: New Mexico Ice Wolves

The New Mexico Ice Wolves are a Tier II junior ice hockey team in the North American Hockey League's South Division. The Wolves play their home games in the Outpost Ice Arenas in Albuquerque, New Mexico.

== History ==
On February 28, 2019, the NAHL board of governors announced that they had approved the membership application for a team in New Mexico owned by Desert Ice Investment, LLC and that the team would start play in the 2019–20 season as a member of the South Division. Their inaugural season was cut short due to the COVID-19 pandemic, but the team had already been eliminated from playoff contention with 31 points in 52 games played. The team still won several postseason accolades such as Southern Division Organization of the Year and the NAHL's overall Organization of the Year. The following season, the team was forced to play home games in Texas due to the pandemic restrictions in New Mexico.

In 2022, the Ice Wolves added a Tier III junior team of the same name in the North American 3 Hockey League (NA3HL).

== Season-by-season records ==
Season	GP	W	L	OTL	SOL	Pts	GF	GA	Finish	Playoffs
2019–20	52	13	34	2	3	31	105	190	6th of 7, South; 24th of 26, NAHL	Season cancelled
2020–21	56	21	30	3	2	47	147	184	5th of 6, South; 19th of 23, NAHL	Did not qualify
2021–22	60	38	16	2	3	81	193	145	2nd of 8, South; 4th of 29, NAHL	Won Div. Semifinal series, 3–2 vs. Wichita Falls Warriors; Won Div. Final series, 3–2 vs. Lone Star Brahmas; Lost League Semifinal series, 1–2 vs. New Jersey Titans
2022–23	60	33	23	3	1	70	195	170	5th of 8, South; 10th of 29, NAHL	Did not qualify
2023–24	60	32	19	6	3	73	195	179	4th of 8, South; 13th of 32, NAHL	Won Div. Play-In series, 2–0 vs. Amarillo Wranglers; Lost Div. Semifinal series, 1–3 vs. Lone Star Brahmas
2024–25	59	31	21	4	3	69	163	155	4th of 9, South; 15th of 35, NAHL	Won Div. Play-In series, 2–1 vs. El Paso Rhinos; Lost Div. Semifinal series, 0–3 Lone Star Brahmas
