= Danbury Jr. Hat Tricks =

North American Hockey League team based in Danbury, Connecticut

- City: Danbury, Connecticut
- League: North American Hockey League
- Division: East
- Founded: 2010
- Home arena: Danbury Ice Arena
- Owner: Lisa Claire-Sigal
- General manager: Lenny Cagliaonne
- Head coach: Lenny Cagliaonne
- Website: NAHL's Jr. Hat Tricks

Franchise history
- 2010–2012: Dawson Creek Rage
- 2015–2020: Wilkes-Barre/Scranton Knights
- 2020–present: Danbury Jr. Hat Tricks

The Danbury Jr. Hat Tricks are a USA Hockey-sanctioned Tier II junior ice hockey team that play out of the Danbury Ice Arena in Danbury, Connecticut. The Jr. Hat Tricks are members of the North American Hockey League (NAHL) and are named after and operated by the ownership of the Danbury Hat Tricks, a minor professional team in the Federal Prospects Hockey League that was founded in 2019.

== History ==
On May 11, 2020, the organization announced they had bought a franchise in the Tier II junior North American Hockey League (NAHL) from the Wilkes-Barre/Scranton Knights which would be named the Danbury Jr. Hat Tricks after the professional team. subsequently, the NA3HL team that was also operated by the organization was renamed as the Danbury Jr. Hat Tricks as well. Billy McCreary, who had won Coach of the Year in the FPHL in his first season, stepped down from his coaching position with the professional team and became head coach of the NAHL team.

Following the 2021-22 season, Billy McCreary became the President of Hockey Operations overseeing all three teams in the organization. Longtime assistant coach Matt Voity became the Head Coach and General Manager of the NAHL team.

In the summer of 2024, the NA3HL released the schedule for the upcoming season. The Tier III Jr. Hat Tricks were not included and the league did not comment on their removal from the league.

The 2025-26 season (6th) marked the Hat Tricks NAHL team first playoff season, including their first series win.

== Season-by-season records ==
Season	GP	W	L	OTL	SOL	Pts	GF	GA	Finish	Playoffs
2020–21	54	20	27	6	1	47	148	187	6th of 6, East Div. 18th of 23, NAHL	Did Not Qualify
2021–22	60	12	42	5	1	30	153	258	7th of 7, East Div. 29th of 29, NAHL	Did Not Qualify
2022–23	60	6	47	5	2	19	102	246	7th of 7, East Div. 29th of 29, NAHL	Did Not Qualify
2023–24	60	16	36	6	2	40	135	233	9th of 9th East Division; 30th of 32 NAHL	Did Not Qualify
2024–25	59	23	33	3	0	49	182	223	8th of 10th East Division; 28th of 35 NAHL	Did Not Qualify
2025–26	59	27	24	5	3	62	182	187	6th of 10th East Division; 20th of 34 NAHL	Won Div Playin 2-0 (New Jersey Titans); Lost Div Semifinals 0-3 (Maryland Black Bears)
