= Bismarck Bobcats =

- City: Bismarck, North Dakota
- League: North American Hockey League
- Division: Central
- Founded: 1997 (In the AFHL)
- Home arena: V.F.W. Sports Center
- Colors: Black, white, Vegas gold
- Owner: Thom Brigl
- General manager: Niko Kapetanovic
- Head coach: Garrett Roth (2024-25)
- Media: Brandon Luisi; KLXX-AM Super Talk 1270 (radio flagship); Bismarck Tribune; KXMB-TV CBS 12

Franchise history
- 1997–present: Bismarck Bobcats

Championships
- Regular season titles: 2025
- Division titles: 2009, 2010, 2011, 2012, 2013, 2016, 2025
- Borne Cups: 2003, 2004
- Robertson Cups: 2010, 2025

The Bismarck Bobcats are a Tier II junior ice hockey team in the North American Hockey League's (NAHL) Central Division, and play out of Bismarck, North Dakota, in the V.F.W. Sports Center. Originally a part of the American Frontier Hockey League (and later called the America West Hockey League), the Bobcats joined the NAHL in a merger of the two leagues in 2003. In 2005, the Bobcats hosted the Robertson Cup tournament.

The Bobcats won the 2010 Robertson Cup, winning their first national championship with a 3–0 victory over the Fairbanks Ice Dogs. They won their second title in 2025 with a 4-2 victory over the Lone Star Brahmas.

== History ==
The Bismarck Bobcats came to Bismarck in 1997 as a member of the American Frontier Hockey League (AFWHL) and played their first season at the Bismarck Civic Center, but moved to the V.F.W. Sports Center the following year. The AFHL rebranded to the America West Hockey League (AWHL) in 1998. The Bobcats won back-to-back Borne Cup titles as champions of the AWHL in 2003 and 2004. Their 2004 title was the last Borne Cup to be awarded prior to the merger between the North American Hockey League (NAHL) and AWHL for the 2004–05 season.

Byron Pool served as head coach from 2008 to 2010 and was named the NAHL "Coach of the Year" in 2009. In addition to leading the team to its first Robertson Cup title in 2010, he led the Bobcats to the most successful regular season in history in the 2008–09 season. The Bobcats won 43 games and earned 88 points in the standings, which both set franchise records. The Bobcats won consecutive Central Division playoff titles under Pool in 2009 and 2010.

Layne Sedevie became head coach in 2010, promoted from assistant coach, following Byron Pool's decision to accept an associate head coach position with the Fargo Force of the United States Hockey League. Sedevie, a Bismarck native, was a goaltender at Bemidji State University and played professionally in the Central Hockey League before serving as assistant coach under Pool for the 2009–10 season. In his first season behind the bench, he led the Bobcats to their third straight Central Division playoff championship.

The Bobcats have had five head coaches in their tenure in Bismarck including: John Becanic; Chad Johnson, Dane Litke, Pool, Layne Sedevie, and Garrett Roth.

Currently, they are the second-oldest franchise in the NAHL behind the Springfield Jr. Blues.

=== Rivalries ===
The Bobcats have two primary rivals: the Aberdeen Wings and the Minot Minotauros.

The Bobcats-Wings rivalry is centered on the Titan Machinery Dakota Cup. The Bobcats, despite being the defending national champions in 2010–11, suffered multiple setbacks against the expansion Wings in front of capacity crowds at both teams' rinks before winning the trophy by a point total of 15–11. The 2011–12 Dakota Cup was much more lopsided, as the Bobcats won the Cup 21–7, posting a 10–1–1 regular season record against the Wings. In the 2012 playoffs, the Bobcats defeated the Wings in four games in the Central Division semifinals.

The Bobcats and Tauros is a newer intrastate rivalry, and the proximity (roughly 100 miles along US-83) of the two teams that share North Dakota has already produced multiple fights.

Former Bobcats rivals include the Alexandria Blizzard, North Iowa Outlaws, and Owatonna Express.

== Season-by-season records ==
Season	GP	W	L	OTL	PTS	GF	GA	Finish	Playoffs
American Frontier Hockey League
1997–98	60	27	27	6	60	260	269	4th of 7, AFHL	Information missing
America West Hockey League
1998–99	60	31	25	4	66	211	212	5th of 6, AWHL	Information missing
1999–2000	58	30	22	6	66	240	214	3rd of 8, AWHL	Information missing
2000–01	60	32	24	4	68	248	228	5th of 9, AWHL	Information missing
2001–02	56	30	20	6	66	221	166	5th of 9, AWHL	Information missing
2002–03	56	37	13	6	80	231	159	2nd of 7, North; 4th of 11, AWHL	Won Championship
North American Hockey League
2003–04	56	30	22	4	64	184	184	3rd of 7, West; 9th of 21, NAHL	Won Div. Semifinal series, 3–0 (Fargo-Moorhead Jets); Won Div. Final series, 3–1 (Billings Bulls); Won Round-Robin Semifinal, 3–2 (Springfield Jr. Blues), 3–2 (Fairbanks Ice Dogs), 3–8 (Texas Tornado); Lost Robertson Cup Championship, 1–4 (Texas Tornado)
2004–05	56	25	22	9	59	165	172	5th of 6, West; 12th of 19, NAHL	Did not qualify
2005–06	58	31	23	4	66	204	184	3rd of 5, Central; 10th of 20, NAHL	Lost Div. Semifinal series, 1–3 (Fargo-Moorhead Jets)
2006–07	62	26	30	6	58	193	221	5th of 6, Central; 12th of 17, NAHL	Did not qualify
2007–08	58	20	32	6	46	148	215	6th of 6, Central; 15th of 18, NAHL	Did not qualify
2008–09	58	43	13	2	88	202	121	1st of 6, Central; 3rd of 19, NAHL	Won Div. Semifinal series, 3–1 (Alexandria Blizzard); Won Div. Final series, 3–2 (Owatonna Express); Lost Round-Robin Semifinal, 2–4 (Mahoning Valley Phantoms), 2–5 (St. Louis Bandits), 2–3 (Wenatchee Wild), 3–2 (2OT) (North Iowa Outlaws)
2009–10	58	39	11	8	86	195	130	1st of 6, Central; 4th of 19, NAHL	Won Div. Semifinal series, 3–0 (Albert Lea Thunder); Won Div. Final series, 3–0 (Alexandria Blizzard); Won Round-Robin Semifinal, 6–1 (Traverse City North Stars), 5–3 (St. Louis Bandits), 1–2 (Wenatchee Wild), 3–4 (Fairbanks Ice Dogs); Won Robertson Cup Championship, 3–0 (Fairbanks Ice Dogs)
2010–11	58	31	22	5	67	179	156	4th of 6, Central; 14th of 26, NAHL	Won Div. Semifinal series, 3–2 (Alexandria Blizzard); Won Div. Final series, 3–2 (Coulee Region Chill); Lost Quarterfinal Play-in series, 0–2 (Michigan Warriors)
2011–12	60	45	13	2	92	237	160	1st of 5, Central; 2nd of 28, NAHL	Won Div. Semifinal series, 3–1 (Aberdeen Wings); Won Div. Final series, 3–1 (Austin Bruins); Lost Round-Robin Quarterfinal, 3–2 (St. Louis Bandits), 1–5 (Port Huron Fighting Falcons), 2–6 (Amarillo Bulls)
2012–13	60	35	16	9	79	183	140	2nd of 6, Central; 7th of 24, NAHL	Won Div. Semifinal series, 3–0 (Brookings Blizzard); Won Div. Final series, 3–1 (Austin Bruins); Lost Round-Robin Semifinal, 4–3 (Jamestown Ironmen), 1–2 (OT) (Amarillo Bulls), 3–2 (Wenatchee Wild)
2013–14	60	31	24	5	67	176	157	3rd of 5, Central; 11th of 24, NAHL	Won Div. Semifinal series, 3–0 (Aberdeen Wings); Lost Div. Final series, 2–3 (Austin Bruins)
2014–15	60	30	26	4	64	185	185	3rd of 5, Central; 13th of 24, NAHL	Lost Div. Semifinal series, 0–3 (Minot Minotauros)
2015–16	60	37	19	4	78	185	133	1st of 6, Central; 4th of 22, NAHL	Won Div. Semifinal series, 3–1 (Brookings Blizzard); Won Div. Final series, 3–2 (Austin Bruins); Lost Robertson Cup Semifinal series, 0–2 (Wichita Falls Wildcats)
2016–17	60	28	30	2	58	187	209	5th of 6, Central; 19th of 24, NAHL	Did not qualify
2017–18	60	24	30	6	54	165	184	5th of 6, Central; 18th of 23, NAHL	Did not qualify
2018–19	60	34	21	5	73	182	163	3rd of 6, Central; 8th of 24, NAHL	Lost Div. Semifinal series, 0–3 (Minot Minotauros)
2019–20	52	32	12	8	72	178	130	2nd of 6, Central t-6th of 23, NAHL	Postseason cancelled
2020–21	56	29	21	6	64	173	151	2nd of 6, Central; 9th of 23, NAHL	Won Div. Semifinal series, 3–0 (Minnesota Wilderness); Lost Div. Final series, 0–3 (Aberdeen Wings)
2021–22	60	29	27	4	62	210	206	4th of 6, Central; 19th of 29, NAHL	Lost Div. Semifinal series, 2–3 (St. Cloud Norsemen)
2022–23	60	29	25	6	64	197	182	5th of 6, Central; 18th of 29, NAHL	Did not qualify
2023–24	60	40	16	4	84	209	145	2nd of 6 Central; 4th of 32 NAHL	Won Div. Semifinal series, 3–2 (Aberdeen Wings); Lost Div. Final series, 1–3 (Minot Minotauros)
2024–25	59	47	10	2	96	206	103	1st of 8 Central; 1st of 35 NAHL	Won Div. Semifinal series, 3–2 (Aberdeen Wings); Won Div. Final series, 3–1 (Austin Bruins); Won Robertson Cup Semifinal series, 2–1 (Rochester Jr. Americans); Won Robertson Cup Championship, 4–2 (Lone Star Brahmas)
2025–26	59	39	15	3	83	246	165	2nd of 8 Central; 5th of 34 NAHL	Lost Div. Semifinal series, 2–3 (Aberdeen Wings)
