= St. Cloud Norsemen =

- City: St. Cloud, Minnesota
- League: North American Hockey League
- Division: Central
- Founded: 2003
- Home arena: St. Cloud Municipal Athletic Complex
- Colors: Black, blue, gray, and white
- Owners: Chris and Mitri Canavati
- General manager: Joe Exter (2024-25)
- Head coach: Joe Exter (2024-25)

Franchise history
- 2003–2006: Minnesota Blizzard
- 2006–2012: Alexandria Blizzard
- 2012–2019: Brookings Blizzard
- 2019–2020: St. Cloud Blizzard
- 2020–present: St. Cloud Norsemen

Championships
- Division titles: 2 (2011, 2022)

The St. Cloud Norsemen is a Tier II junior ice hockey team in the North American Hockey League's (NAHL) Central Division. The Norsemen play out of the St. Cloud Municipal Athletic Complex in St. Cloud, Minnesota. The team consists of players ranging in age from 16–20 years old who relocate from anywhere in the United States, with a limited number of international players. The team plays a 60-game schedule from September to March.

The team began in the 2003–04 season as the Minnesota Blizzard based in Alexandria, Minnesota. In 2006, the team was re-branded as the Alexandria Blizzard and played at the Runestone Community Center. From 2012 to 2019, the organization played at the Larson Ice Center in Brookings, South Dakota, as the Brookings Blizzard.

On May 6, 2020, the Blizzard announced their rebrand to Norsemen.

== Season-by-season records ==
Season	GP	W	L	OTL	PTS	GF	GA	PIM	Finish	Playoffs
Minnesota Blizzard
2003–04	56	28	24	4	60	159	198	1,360	4th, Central	Lost 1st Round, 0–3 vs. Fargo-Moorhead Jets
2004–05	56	28	24	4	60	159	198	1,360	4th, Central	Lost 1st Round, 0–3 vs. Fargo-Moorhead Jets
2005–06	58	24	29	5	53	158	219	1,235	4th, Central	Lost 1st Round, 2–3 vs. Southern Minnesota Express
Alexandria Blizzard
2006–07	62	28	29	5	61	165	193	1,325	3rd, Central	Lost 1st Round, 2–3 vs. Southern Minnesota Express
2007–08	58	29	25	4	62	222	223	1,517	3rd, Central	Won 1st Round, 3–2 vs. Southern Minnesota Express; Won 2nd Round, 3–2 vs. Springfield Jr. Blues; Eliminated (0–3) in Robertson Cup Round Robin (L, 2–3 vs. Bandits; L, 2–4 vs. RoadRunners; L, 1–6 vs. Phantoms)
2008–09	58	26	26	6	58	180	201	1,215	4th, Central	Lost 1st Round, 1–3 vs. Bismarck Bobcats
2009–10	58	30	22	6	66	180	166	870	3rd, Central	Won 1st Round, 3–1 vs. Owatonna Express; Lost 2nd Round, 0–3 vs. Bismarck Bobcats
2010–11	58	33	19	6	72	208	177	923	1st, Central	Lost 1st Round, 2–3 vs. Bismarck Bobcats
2011–12	60	40	15	5	85	212	156	815	2nd, Central	Lost 1st Round, 1–3 vs. Austin Bruins
Brookings Blizzard
2012–13	60	32	23	5	69	175	179	1204	3rd, Central	Lost 1st Round, 0–3 vs. Bismarck Bobcats
2013–14	60	18	34	8	44	132	206	1263	5th, Central	Did not qualify
2014–15	60	19	32	9	47	141	206	968	5th, Central	Did not qualify
2015–16	60	25	29	6	56	149	200	985	4th, Central	Lost Div. Semifinals, 1–3 vs. Bismarck Bobcats
2016–17	60	30	25	5	65	192	193	973	3rd, Central	Lost Div. Semifinals, 2–3 vs. Minnesota Wilderness
2017–18	60	23	30	7	53	169	211	778	6th, Central	Did not qualify
2018–19	60	11	44	5	27	115	242	878	6th, Central	Did not qualify
St. Cloud Blizzard
2019–20	52	10	37	5	25	130	240	770	6th, Central	Season cancelled
St. Cloud Norsemen
2020–21	56	22	33	1	45	151	206	917	6th, Central	Did not qualify
2021–22	60	41	16	3	85	230	153	818	1st of 6, Central; 3rd of 29, NAHL	Won Div. Semifinals, 3–2 vs. Bismarck Bobcats; Won Div. Finals, 3–1 vs. Aberdeen Wings; Lost League Semifinals, 0–2 vs. Anchorage Wolverines
2022–23	60	28	23	9	65	163	184	916	3rd of 6, Central; 16th of 29, NAHL	Won Div. Semifinals, 3–0 vs. Aberdeen Wings; Lost Div. Finals, 1–3 vs. Austin Bruins
2023–24	59	25	21	13	63	171	171	1122	5th of 6, Central; 21 of 32, NAHL	Did not qualify
2024–25	59	30	22	7	67	168	164	738	5th of 8, Central; 19 of 35, NAHL	Did not qualify
2025–26	59	23	30	6	52	155	208	843	6th of 8, Central; 28 of 34, NAHL	Did not qualify

== College commitments ==
About one third of the NAHL roster end up committing to an NCAA school. Below are St. Cloud Norsemen players that have made NCAA Division I commitments.

Player	School	Conference	College Commitment
Andrle, Connor	United States Military Academy	Atlantic Hockey	2013–14
Bitz, Michael	Bemidji State University	WCHA	2012–13
Brevig, Drew	Ohio State University	Big Ten	2012–13
Cavallini, Aidan	University of Wisconsin	Big Ten	2012–13
Connor, Girard	United States Air Force Academy	Atlantic Hockey	2013–14
DeCenzo, Nick	United States Military Academy	Atlantic Hockey	2013–14
Gameli, Chase	Lake Superior State University	WCHA	2015–16
Gauthier, Will	Lake Superior State University	WCHA	2015–16
Graber, Will	Dartmouth College	ECAC Hockey	2013–14
Hakkarainen, Mikael	Providence College	Hockey East	2017–18
Jeszka, Griff	University of Massachusetts	Hockey East	2016–17
Marooney, Cody	University of Alabama-Huntsville	WCHA	2012–13
Parker, Brandon	University of Alabama-Huntsville	WCHA	2013–14
Samec, T.J.	Rensselaer Polytechnic Institute	ECAC Hockey	2016–17
Youso, Matt	University of Nebraska-Omaha	NCHC	2013–14
