= 2013–14 NAHL season =

- League: North American Hockey League
- Sport: Ice hockey
- Duration: Regular season September 13, 2013 – March 30, 2014; Postseason; April 3 – May 10, 2014
- Games: 60
- Teams: 24

Draft
- Top draft pick: James Roll
- Picked by: Rio Grande Valley Killer Bees

Regular season
- Season champions: Fairbanks Ice Dogs
- Season MVP: Alec Butcher (Kenai River Brown Bears)
- Top scorer: Alec Butcher (Kenai River Brown Bears)

Robertson Cup Playoffs
- Finals champions: Fairbanks Ice Dogs
- Runners-up: Austin Bruins

NAHL seasons
- ← 2012–13 2014–15 →

The 2013–14 NAHL season was the 30th season of the North American Hockey League. The regular season ran from September 2013 to April 2014 with a 60-game schedule for each team. The Fairbanks Ice Dogs won the regular season championship and went on to defeat the Austin Bruins 2 games to 0 in the championship round to capture the Robertson Cup.

== Member changes ==
- In July, 2012, the NAHL received an application for a new franchise in Laredo, Texas. After receiving approval, the prospective club planned on being active by the start of this season. However, the club never materialized.
- In December 2012, The dormant New Mexico Mustangs franchise was purchased by the Minnesota Junior Hockey Group. The club was moved to Richfield, Minnesota and became the Minnesota Magicians.
- On January 19, 2013, USA Hockey approved the transfer of the Wenatchee Wild from the NAHL to the British Columbia Hockey League for the 2013–14 season. However, on May 14, 2013, the Wild announced they would instead relocate the franchise to Hidalgo, Texas and play as the Rio Grande Valley Killer Bees of the NAHL. Eight days later, the Wenatchee City Council approved a deal to purchase the Fresno Monsters franchise and relocate it to Wenatchee, assuming the Wild's name.
- In mid-February, the Kalamazoo Jr. K-Wings announced that they would be folding at the end of the season. The team attempted to sell the franchise rights but ended up dissolving when no prospective buyer surfaced.
- On May 10, 2013, the Minnesota Wilderness, an active junior team from the Superior International Junior Hockey League (SIJHL), were granted permission to join the NAHL. As part of the arrangement, the team purchased the franchise rights from the dormant St. Louis Bandits who had last played in 2012.
- Around the same time, the Jamestown Ironmen decided to suspend operations and released all of their players from their contracts.
- In July, the Texas Tornado was sold to Texas Hockey Partners (THP). The franchise was relocated to North Richland Hills, Texas and became the Lone Star Brahmas.

== Regular season ==
The standings at the end of the regular season were as follows:

Note: x = clinched playoff berth; y = clinched division title; z = clinched regular season title

=== Standings ===
==== Central Division ====
Team	GP	W	L	OTL	Pts	GF	GA
xy – Austin Bruins	60	40	19	1	81	189	155
x – Aberdeen Wings	60	38	18	4	80	183	140
x – Bismarck Bobcats	60	31	24	5	67	176	157
x – Minot Minotauros	60	24	33	3	51	130	165
Brookings Blizzard	60	18	34	8	44	132	206

==== Midwest Division ====
Team	GP	W	L	OTL	Pts	GF	GA
xyz – Fairbanks Ice Dogs	60	45	14	1	91	215	136
x – Minnesota Wilderness	60	37	14	9	83	159	115
x – Wenatchee Wild	60	29	23	8	66	169	163
x – Kenai River Brown Bears	60	28	24	8	64	164	178
Coulee Region Chill	60	31	28	1	63	181	181
Minnesota Magicians	60	21	31	8	50	143	193

==== North Division ====
Team	GP	W	L	OTL	Pts	GF	GA
xy – Port Huron Fighting Falcons	60	35	15	10	80	187	151
x – Michigan Warriors	60	30	20	10	70	178	173
x – Janesville Jets	60	32	24	4	68	171	174
x – Johnstown Tomahawks	60	28	27	5	61	167	181
Springfield Jr. Blues	60	26	26	8	60	141	160
Soo Eagles	60	25	27	8	58	149	187

==== South Division ====
Team	GP	W	L	OTL	Pts	GF	GA
xy – Amarillo Bulls	60	40	14	6	86	207	120
x – Topeka RoadRunners	60	39	15	6	84	180	122
x – Rio Grande Valley Killer Bees	60	35	18	7	77	150	121
x – Wichita Falls Wildcats	60	31	25	4	66	170	157
Lone Star Brahmas	60	23	33	4	50	136	204
Corpus Christi IceRays	60	19	31	10	48	124	178
Odessa Jackalopes	60	15	40	5	35	123	217

=== Statistics ===
==== Scoring leaders ====
The following players led the league in regular season points at the completion of all regular season games.

Player	Team	GP	G	A	Pts	PIM
Alec Butcher	Kenai River Brown Bears	60	24	42	66	70
Jay Dickman	Austin Bruins	59	28	36	64	68
Mike Davis	Amarillo Bulls	60	28	35	63	125
Tyler Poulsen	Topeka RoadRunners	56	29	32	61	44
Jake Kamrass	Topeka RoadRunners	60	24	35	59	59
Tayler Munson	Fairbanks Ice Dogs	56	24	34	58	33
T. J. Roo	Amarillo Bulls	56	22	32	54	26
Tyler Gernhofer	Aberdeen Wings	55	31	22	53	50
Troy Loggins	Wenatchee Wild	60	23	30	53	45
Michael Louria	Janesville/Minot	53	26	26	52	30

==== Leading goaltenders ====
Note: GP = Games played; Mins = Minutes played; W = Wins; L = Losses; OTL = Overtime losses; SOL = Shootout losses; SO = Shutouts; GAA = Goals against average; SV% = Save percentage

Player	Team	GP	Mins	W	L	OTL	SOL	SO	GA	SV	SV%	GAA
Kasimir Kaskisuo	Minnesota Wilderness	32	1951:24	21	6	1	4	9	48	814	.944	1.48
P. J. Bridges	Topeka RoadRunners	36	2101:14	26	5	1	2	10	54	851	.940	1.54
Collin Delia	Amarillo Bulls	31	1722:58	22	7	0	0	7	45	683	.937	1.57
Nick Schmit	Rio Grande Valley Killer Bees	30	1556:32	17	9	0	1	6	43	538	.926	1.66
Nick Lehr	Austin Bruins	49	2927:13	35	13	0	1	6	90	1,231	.932	1.85

== Robertson Cup playoffs ==
Teams are reseeded prior to the semifinal round based upon regular season records.

Division Semifinals (Best-of-5)
C1	Austin Bruins	6	2	2	4***	-
C4	Minot Minotauros	8	1	1	3	-
Central Division
C2	Aberdeen Wings	2	1	0	-	-
C3	Bismarck Bobcats	4	5	5	-	-
MW1	Fairbanks Ice Dogs	3	2	5	3	3*
MW4	Kenai River Brown Bears	0	3*	2	4	2
Midwest Division
MW2	Minnesota Wilderness	0	3	4	4	0
MW3	Wenatchee Wild	3	4	0	2	1*
N1	Port Huron Fighting Falcons	3	4*	4	-	-
N4	Johnstown Tomahawks	2	3	3	-	-
North Division
N2	Michigan Warriors	4	5	3	-	-
N3	Janesville Jets	2	1	2	-	-
S1	Amarillo Bulls	4	7	3	-	-
S4	Wichita Falls Wildcats	2	4	2	-	-
South Division
S2	Topeka RoadRunners	3	2*	3*	-	-
S3	Rio Grande Valley Killer Bees	1	1	2	-	-

Division Finals (Best-of-5)
C1	Austin Bruins	5*	1	0	4	2
C3	Bismarck Bobcats	4	2*	4	3	1
MW1	Fairbanks Ice Dogs	0	4	2	2	3*
MW3	Wenatchee Wild	4	2	0	3***	2
N1	Port Huron Fighting Falcons	0	0	2	0	-
N2	Michigan Warriors	1***	3	1	4	-
S1	Amarillo Bulls	2	1	3*	5	2
S2	Topeka RoadRunners	3	3	2	2	6

Semifinal (Best-of-3)
1	Fairbanks Ice Dogs	3	3	-
4	Michigan Warriors	1	0	-
2	Austin Bruins	5	6	4*
3	Topeka RoadRunners	7	4	3

Championship (Best-of-3)
1	Fairbanks Ice Dogs	5*	6	-
2	Austin Bruins	4	2	-

Note: * denotes overtime period(s)

== Division Semifinals ==
=== Central Division ===
==== (C1) Austin Bruins vs. (C4) Minot Minotauros ====
April 4	Austin Bruins	6 – 8	Minot Minotauros	Riverside Arena
2:41 - Guillaume Leclerc (1); 5:35 - Niko Hildenbrand (1); 7:18 - sh - Luke Dietsch (1)		First period	Jake McCann (1); Michael Louria (1) - pp Michael Louria (2) - 15:27; Jadin Martin (1) - 16:09
0:26 - Jake Arroyo (1); 9:15 - Luke Dietsch (2)		Second period	Scott Dornbrock (1) - 5:59; Tim Donohue (1) - pp - 19:43
2:05 - sh - Luke Dietsch (3)		Third period	Jacob Howie (1) - 4:03; Tim Donohue (2) - 19:20
Nick Lehr (18 saves / 26 shots)		Goalie stats	Brandon Wildung (4 saves / 7 shots); Merrick Madsen (29 saves / 32 shots)

April 5	Austin Bruins	2 – 1	Minot Minotauros	Riverside Arena
1:17 - Drew Anderson (1)		First period	Jake McCann (2) - 16:54
17:37 - Jay Dickman (1)		Second period	No scoring
No scoring		Third period	No scoring
Nick Lehr (13 saves / 14 shots)		Goalie stats	Merrick Madsen (31 saves / 33 shots)

April 11	Minot Minotauros	1 – 2	Austin Bruins	Maysa Arena
No scoring		First period	Casey Jerry (1) - 12:01; Luke Dietsch (3) - 16:29
19:03 - pp - Jon Lizotte (1)		Second period	No scoring
No scoring		Third period	No scoring
Merrick Madsen (36 saves / 38 shots)		Goalie stats	Nick Lehr (27 saves / 28 shots)

April 12	Minot Minotauros	3 – 4	3OT	Austin Bruins	Maysa Arena
18:28 - Tim Donohue (3); 18:39 - Luke Voltin (1)		First period		No scoring
9:54 - Jake Johnson (1)		Second period		Easton Viitala (1) - 5:54; Trey Dodd (1) - pp - 12:02; Lucas Kohls (1) - pp - 15:41
No scoring		Third period		No scoring
No scoring		Third overtime period		Lucas Kohls (2) - 16:57
Brandon Wildung (67 saves / 71 shots)		Goalie stats		Nick Lehr (50 saves / 53 shots)

Austin wins series 3 – 1

==== (C2) Aberdeen Wings vs. (C3) Bismarck Bobcats ====
April 4	Aberdeen Wings	2 – 4	Bismarck Bobcats	Odde Ice Center
5:38 - pp - T.J. Roo (1)		First period	Evan Giesler (1) - 3:39
No scoring		Second period	Evan Giesler (2) - 6:17; Evan Giesler (3) - 14:55; Filip Starzynski (1) - 16:01
6:46 - Drew Doyon (1)		Third period	No scoring
Chad Catt (27 saves / 31 shots)		Goalie stats	Aaron Nelson (29 saves / 31 shots)

April 5	Aberdeen Wings	1 – 5	Bismarck Bobcats	Odde Ice Center
No scoring		First period	Zach Yon (1) - pp - 14:47
No scoring		Second period	Cullen Willox (1) - 11:35; Zach Yon (2) - 11:59; Evan Giesler (4) - pp - 15:40
16:58 - pp - Erik Baskin (1)		Third period	Evan Giesler (5) - sh - 9:46
Henry Dill (26 saves / 31 shots)		Goalie stats	Aaron Nelson (27 saves / 28 shots)

April 11	Bismarck Bobcats	5 – 0	Aberdeen Wings	V.F.W. Sports Center
8:21 - Zach Yon (3); 9:45 - Ryan Callahan (1)		First period	No scoring
14:41 - Alex Toscano (1); 19:25 - Evan Giesler (6)		Second period	No scoring
11:01 - Huba Sekesi (1)		Third period	No scoring
Aaron Nelson (27 saves / 27 shots); Scott Albertoni (3 saves / 3 shots)		Goalie stats	Henry Dill (37 saves / 42 shots)

Bismarck wins series 3 – 0

=== Midwest Division ===
==== (MW1) Fairbanks Ice Dogs vs. (MW4) Kenai River Brown Bears ====
April 4	Fairbanks Ice Dogs	3 – 0	Kenai River Brown Bears	Big Dipper Ice Arena
11:16 - pp - Tayler Munson (1)		First period	No scoring
15:07 - Lonnie Clary (1)		Second period	No scoring
9:11 - Hans Gorowsky (1)		Third period	No scoring
Kevin Aldridge (23 saves / 23 shots)		Goalie stats	Zach Quinn (31 saves / 34 shots)

April 5	Fairbanks Ice Dogs	2 – 3	OT	Kenai River Brown Bears	Big Dipper Ice Arena
No scoring		First period		No scoring
18:44 - Wyatt Ege (1)		Second period		Alec Butcher (1) - 8:54; Alec Butcher (2) - 19:45
6:57 - Johnny Mueller (1)		Third period		No scoring
No scoring		First overtime period		Alec Butcher (3) - pp - 11:15
Kevin Aldridge (26 saves / 29 shots)		Goalie stats		Zach Quinn (43 saves / 45 shots)

April 8	Kenai River Brown Bears	2 – 5	Fairbanks Ice Dogs	Soldotna Sports Center
17:16 - Nate Colwell (1)		First period	Wyatt Ege (2) - 12:14; Yannick Vedel (1) - 12:34; Ross Olsson (1) - 19:26
9:22 - Albin Karlsson (1)		Second period	No scoring
No scoring		Third period	Todd Burgess (1) - pp - 0:48; Johnny Mueller (2) - 12:32
Zach Quinn (27 saves / 32 shots)		Goalie stats	Kevin Aldridge (22 saves / 24 shots)

April 9	Kenai River Brown Bears	4 – 3	Fairbanks Ice Dogs	Soldotna Sports Center
6:58 - Albin Karlsson (2)		First period	Ross Olsson (2) - 17:06
17:27 - Albin Karlsson (3)		Second period	No scoring
4:08 - Matt Rudin (1); 8:13 - Jacob Davidson (1)		Third period	Ross Olsson (3) - 1:56; Viktor Liljegren (1) - 19:52
Kris Oldham (26 saves / 31 shots)		Goalie stats	Kevin Aldridge (19 saves / 23 shots)

April 12	Fairbanks Ice Dogs	3 – 2	OT	Kenai River Brown Bears	Big Dipper Ice Arena
8:17 - Wyatt Ege (3); 15:14 - Hans Gorowsky (2)		First period		Frankie Spellman (1) - 1:26
No scoring		Second period		Frankie Spellman (2) - 3:48
No scoring		Third period		No scoring
4:44 - Kyle Lee (1)		First overtime period		No scoring
Kevin Aldridge (18 saves / 20 shots)		Goalie stats		Zach Quinn (43 saves / 46 shots)

Fairbanks wins series 3 – 2

==== (MW2) Minnesota Wilderness vs. (MW3) Wenatchee Wild ====
April 4	Minnesota Wilderness	0 – 3	Wenatchee Wild	Northwoods Credit Union Arena
No scoring		First period	David Powlowski (1) - 17:36
No scoring		Second period	Matt Nuttle (1) - 17:31; Nicholas Rivera (1) - 18:14
No scoring		Third period	No scoring
Kasimir Kaskisuo (27 saves / 30 shots)		Goalie stats	Chase Perry (29 saves / 29 shots)

April 5	Minnesota Wilderness	3 – 4	Wenatchee Wild	Northwoods Credit Union Arena
15:34 - Darian Romanko (1); 18:41 - pp - Jakob Romo (1)		First period	Alex Rauter (1) - pp - 7:37; Alex Rauter (2) - sh - 19:30
8:06 - Richard Buri (1)		Second period	Troy Loggins (1) - 4:27; Nicholas Rivera (2) - 14:21
No scoring		Third period	No scoring
Kasimir Kaskisuo (5 saves / 7 shots); Frank Oplinger (19 saves / 21 shots)		Goalie stats	Chase Perry (27 saves / 30 shots)

April 6	Minnesota Wilderness	4 – 0	Wenatchee Wild	Northwoods Credit Union Arena
Jaycob McCombs (1) - 18:06		First period	No scoring
Jakob Romo (2) - 0:45; Jakob Romo (3) - 12:52		Second period	No scoring
Michael Covach (1) - en - 19:24		Third period	No scoring
Kasimir Kaskisuo (24 saves / 24 shots)		Goalie stats	Chase Perry (18 saves / 21 shots)

April 11	Wenatchee Wild	2 – 4	Minnesota Wilderness	Town Toyota Center
9:37 - pp - Matt Nuttle (2)		First period	Jaycob McCombs (2) - 2:45
19:33 - pp - Jake Ahlgren (1)		Second period	Eric Brenk (1) - 6:21; Darian Romanko (2) - 13:49
No scoring		Third period	Ivan Chukarov (1) - en - 19:32
Chase Perry (22 saves / 25 shots); Austin Priebe (0 saves / 0 shots)		Goalie stats	Kasimir Kaskisuo (24 saves / 26 shots)

April 12	Wenatchee Wild	1 – 0	OT	Minnesota Wilderness	Town Toyota Center
No scoring		First period		No scoring
No scoring		Second period		No scoring
No scoring		Third period		No scoring
Omar Mullan (1) - 18:41		First overtime period		No scoring
Chase Perry (48 saves / 48 shots)		Goalie stats		Kasimir Kaskisuo (53 saves / 54 shots)

Wenatchee wins series 3 – 2

=== North Division ===
==== (N1) Port Huron Fighting Falcons vs. (N4) Johnstown Tomahawks ====
April 3	Port Huron Fighting Falcons	3 – 2	Johnstown Tomahawks	McMorran Place
1:39 - Bryce VanHorn (1); 6:34 - pp - Bryce VanHorn (2)		First period	Tanner Barnes (1) - 16:35; Jordan Watt (1) - 16:57
No scoring		Second period	No scoring
4:13 - Jon Hall (1)		Third period	No scoring
Max Milosek (19 saves / 21 shots)		Goalie stats	Brett Young (32 saves / 35 shots)

April 4	Port Huron Fighting Falcons	4 – 3	OT	Johnstown Tomahawks	McMorran Place
No scoring		First period		No scoring
19:22 - Noah Batis (1)		Second period		Jordan Watt (2) - 8:05; Brandon Reinholz (1) - sh - 10:24
8:17 - Lucas Little (1); 13:14 - Elliot Tisdale (1)		Third period		No scoring
9:31 - Elliot Tisdale (2)		First overtime period		No scoring
Alex Blankenburg (33 saves / 36 shots)		Goalie stats		Brett Young (48 saves / 52 shots)

April 11	Johnstown Tomahawks	3 – 4	Port Huron Fighting Falcons	Cambria County War Memorial Arena
10:53 - pp - Brandon Reinholz (1); 16:26 - Matthew Meier (1)		First period	Jon Hall (1) - 6:06; Noah Batis (2) - 8:00; Vito Aluia (1) - pp - 15:13
No scoring		Second period	Bryan Yim (1) - pp - 8:41
4:11 - pp - Dakoda Menslage (1)		Third period	No scoring
Brett Young (15 saves / 19 shots); Alex Okicki (6 saves / 6 shots)		Goalie stats	Max Milosek (28 saves / 31 shots)

Port Huron wins series 3 – 0

==== (N2) Michigan Warriors vs. (N3) Janesville Jets ====
April 4	Michigan Warriors	4 – 2	Janesville Jets	Dort Financial Center
14:37 - Jon Farkas (1)		First period	Brandon Schultz (1) - 1:26
No scoring		Second period	No scoring
1:23 - A.J. Marcinek (1); 5:46 - Mitch Wedding (1); 19:59 - en - T.J. Stuntz (1)		Third period	Drew Callin (1) - pp - 8:36
Trevor Gorsuch (30 saves / 32 shots)		Goalie stats	Logan Halladay (20 saves / 23 shots)

April 4	Michigan Warriors	5 – 1	Janesville Jets	Dort Financial Center
2:28 - Colin Horton (1); 11:35 - Zack Szajner (1)		First period	No scoring
7:26 - Tyler Groat (1); 8:10 - pp - Zack Szajner (2)		Second period	Alex Smith (1) - 4:56
3:10 - Connor Lyons (1)		Third period	No scoring
Trevor Gorsuch (28 saves / 29 shots)		Goalie stats	Brock Kautz (28 saves / 33 shots)

April 11	Janesville Jets	2 – 3	Michigan Warriors	Janesville Ice Arena
No scoring		First period	Colin Larkin (1) - 16:42
7:36 - Drew Callin (1)		Second period	Jon Farkas (2) - 10:09
15:48 - Brandon Schultz (1)		Third period	Colin Larkin (2) - 17:25
Brock Kautz (20 saves / 23 shots)		Goalie stats	Trevor Gorsuch (31 saves / 33 shots)

Michigan wins series 3 – 0

=== South Division ===
==== (S1) Amarillo Bulls vs. (S4) Wichita Falls Wildcats ====
April 4	Amarillo Bulls	4 – 2	Wichita Falls Wildcats	Amarillo Civic Center
9:37 - Mike Davis (1)		First period	No scoring
17:58 - sh - Mike Davis (2)		Second period	Matt Koch (1) - sh - 8:38
0:43 - Tyler Gernhofer (1); 9:01 - Brendan Vetter (1)		Third period	Rudy Junda (1) - 10:08
Collin Delia (27 saves / 29 shots)		Goalie stats	David Zevnik (18 saves / 22 shots); Chase Munroe (6 saves / 6 shots)

April 5	Amarillo Bulls	7 – 4	Wichita Falls Wildcats	Amarillo Civic Center
2:09 - sh - Roman Ammirato (1); 8:35 - Cody Gylling (1); 9:51 - Tyler Gernhofer (2)		First period	No scoring
18:19 - pp - Kyle Gattelaro (1)		Second period	Kyle Bauman (1) - pp - 5:24; Todd Koritzinsky (1) - 10:47; Evan Okeley (1) - 10:56
10:42 - pp - Brady Ferguson (1); 11:45 - sh - Brady Ferguson (2); 15:11 - Eric Purcell (1)		Third period	Ben Kucera (1) - pp - 18:04
Paul Berrafato (26 saves / 30 shots)		Goalie stats	Chase Munroe (21 saves / 28 shots)

April 11	Wichita Falls Wildcats	2 – 3	Amarillo Bulls	Kay Yeager Coliseum
0:53 - Nick Farmer (1)		First period	Joe Grabowski (1) - 5:13
5:19 - Max Reisinger (1)		Second period	Eric Purcell (2) - 13:40
No scoring		Third period	Kyle Gattelaro (2) - 0:26
David Zevnik (17 saves / 20 shots)		Goalie stats	Collin Delia (33 saves / 35 shots)

Amarillo wins series 3 – 0

==== (S2) Topeka RoadRunners vs. (S3) Rio Grande Valley Killer Bees ====
April 4	Topeka RoadRunners	3 – 1	Rio Grande Valley Killer Bees	Stormont Vail Events Center
17:02 - Jasen Fernsler (1)		First period	No scoring
14:04 - pp - Jake Kamrass (1)		Second period	No scoring
17:28 - Jake Kamrass (2)		Third period	Marcus Ericsson (1) - 10:44
P.J. Bridges (22 saves / 23 shots)		Goalie stats	Nick Schmit (22 saves / 25 shots)

April 5	Topeka RoadRunners	2 – 1	OT	Rio Grande Valley Killer Bees	Stormont Vail Events Center
No scoring		First period		No scoring
11:23 - pp - James Ring (1)		Second period		Evan Schmidbauer (1) - 9:57
No scoring		Third period		No scoring
6:00 - pp - Tyler Poulsen (1)		First overtime period		No scoring
P.J. Bridges (23 saves / 24 shots)		Goalie stats		Olli Kälkäjä (17 saves / 19 shots)

April 9	Rio Grande Valley Killer Bees	2 – 3	OT	Topeka RoadRunners	State Farm Arena
No scoring		First period		Yu Hikosaka (1) - 1:26; Jasen Fernsler (2) - 16:26
No scoring		Second period		No scoring
3:31 - Daniel Kucerovy (1); 18:28 - Evan Schmidbauer (2)		Third period		No scoring
No scoring		First overtime period		Jasen Fernsler (3) - 14:54
Nick Schmit (5 saves / 7 shots); Olli Kälkäjä (23 saves / 24 shots)		Goalie stats		P.J. Bridges (31 saves / 33 shots)

Topeka wins series 3 – 0

== Division Finals ==
=== Central Division ===
==== (C1) Austin Bruins vs. (C4) Bismarck Bobcats ====
April 18	Austin Bruins	5 – 4	OT	Bismarck Bobcats	Riverside Arena
6:48 - Scott Nelson (1); 8:10 - Trey Dodd (2); 15:03 - Casey Jerry (2)		First period		Tanner Salsberry (1) - 1:11; Evan Giesler (7) - 3:53; Tyler Dunagan (1) - 5:50; Ryan Callahan (2) - 12:04
No scoring		Second period		No scoring
0:39 - Niko Hildenbrand (2)		Third period		No scoring
5:36 - Sam Kauppila (1)		First overtime period		No scoring
Nick Lehr (20 saves / 24 shots)		Goalie stats		Aaron Nelson (40 saves / 45 shots)

April 19	Austin Bruins	1 – 2	OT	Bismarck Bobcats	Riverside Arena
4:22 - Jay Dickman (2)		First period		No scoring
No scoring		Second period		No scoring
No scoring		Third period		Tyler Dunagan (2) - pp - 9:48
No scoring		First overtime period		Stanislav Dzakhov (1) - 6:26
Nick Lehr (20 saves / 22 shots)		Goalie stats		Aaron Nelson (33 saves / 34 shots)

April 25	Bismarck Bobcats	4 – 0	Austin Bruins	V.F.W. Sports Center
15:56 - Chris Diver (1)		First period	No scoring
11:33 - Stanislav Dzakhov (2); 13:40 - pp - Tanner Salsberry (2)		Second period	No scoring
13:05 - Chris Diver (2)		Third period	No scoring
Aaron Nelson (29 saves / 29 shots); Scott Albertoni (0 saves / 0 shots)		Goalie stats	Nick Lehr (16 saves / 19 shots); Dillon Kelley (6 saves / 7 shots)

April 26	Bismarck Bobcats	3 – 4	Austin Bruins	V.F.W. Sports Center
15:02 - Tanner Salsberry (3)		First period	No scoring
14:52 - Stanislav Dzakhov (3); 16:26 Ryan Callahan (3)		Second period	Sam Kauppila (2) - 12:35; Drew Anderson (2) - pp - 14:16
No scoring		Third period	Luke Dietsch (4) - 2:39; Sam Kauppila (3) - 4:24
Aaron Nelson (33 saves / 37 shots)		Goalie stats	Nick Lehr (34 saves / 37 shots)

April 28	Austin Bruins	2 – 1	Bismarck Bobcats	Riverside Arena
7:00 - Brian Bachnak (1)		First period	No scoring
No scoring		Second period	Zach Yon (4) - 19:46
15:04 - Jay Dickman (3)		Third period	No scoring
Nick Lehr (21 saves / 22 shots)		Goalie stats	Aaron Nelson (43 saves / 45 shots)

Austin wins series 3 – 2

=== Midwest Division ===
==== (MW1) Fairbanks Ice Dogs vs. (MW3) Wenatchee Wild ====
April 18	Fairbanks Ice Dogs	0 – 4	Wenatchee Wild	Big Dipper Ice Arena
No scoring		First period	No scoring
No scoring		Second period	Jake Ahlgren (2) - 17:33
No scoring		Third period	Parker Tuomie (1) - 7:06; Parker Tuomie (2) - en - 18:54; Mike Coyne (1) - 19:10
Kevin Aldridge (24 saves / 24 shots)		Goalie stats	Chase Perry (21 saves / 24 shots)

April 19	Fairbanks Ice Dogs	4 – 2	Wenatchee Wild	Big Dipper Ice Arena
4:29 - Colton Wolter (1); 12:48 - pp - Jacob Hetz (1)		First period	David Powlowski (2) - pp - 6:41; Brendan Harris (1) - 8:16
4:12 - Wyatt Ege (4); 16:29 - Nick Hinz (1)		Second period	No scoring
No scoring		Third period	No scoring
Kevin Aldridge (18 saves / 20 shots)		Goalie stats	Chase Perry (27 saves / 31 shots)

April 21	Fairbanks Ice Dogs	2 – 0	Wenatchee Wild	Big Dipper Ice Arena
No scoring		First period	No scoring
Colton Wolter (2) - 12:12		Second period	No scoring
Yannick Vedel (2) - 14:14		Third period	No scoring
Kevin Aldridge (25 saves / 25 shots)		Goalie stats	Chase Perry (17 saves / 19 shots)

April 25	Wenatchee Wild	3 – 2	3OT	Fairbanks Ice Dogs	Town Toyota Center
No scoring		First period		No scoring
12:54 - André Pison (1); 16:51 - Nicholas Rivera (2)		Second period		Viktor Liljegren (2) - 11:26
No scoring		Third period		Brett Gervais (1) - 8:40
0:21 - pp - Parker Tuomie (3)		Third overtime period		No scoring
Chase Perry (42 saves / 44 shots)		Goalie stats		Kevin Aldridge (56 saves / 59 shots)

April 26	Wenatchee Wild	2 – 3	OT	Fairbanks Ice Dogs	Town Toyota Center
No scoring		First period		12:43 - Tayler Munson (2); 15:31 - Viktor Liljegren (3)
Troy Loggins (2) - 3:41		Second period		No scoring
Jake Ahlgren (3) - 3:41		Third period		No scoring
No scoring		First overtime period		2:12 - pp - Kyle Lee (2)
Chase Perry (23 saves / 26 shots)		Goalie stats		Kevin Aldridge (32 saves / 34 shots)

Fairbanks wins series 3 – 2

=== North Division ===
==== (N1) Port Huron Fighting Falcons vs. (N2) Michigan Warriors ====
April 18	Port Huron Fighting Falcons	0 – 1	3OT	Michigan Warriors	McMorran Arena
No scoring		First period		No scoring
No scoring		Second period		No scoring
No scoring		Third period		No scoring
No scoring		Third overtime period		Colin Larkin (3) - 5:37
Alex Blankenburg (51 saves / 52 shots)		Goalie stats		Trevor Gorsuch (55 saves / 55 shots)

April 19	Port Huron Fighting Falcons	0 – 3	Michigan Warriors	McMorran Arena
No scoring		First period	Tyler Groat (2) - 9:29
No scoring		Second period	Tyler Groat (3) - pp - 11:20
No scoring		Third period	T.J. Stuntz (2) - en - 17:52
Max Milosek (27 saves / 29 shots)		Goalie stats	Alex Blankenburg (28 saves / 28 shots)

April 25	Michigan Warriors	1 – 2	Port Huron Fighting Falcons	Dort Financial Center
2:44 - Tyler Groat (4)		First period	Nick Horne (1) - pp - 5:29; Niko Coffman (1) - 11:48
No scoring		Second period	No scoring
No scoring		Third period	No scoring
Trevor Gorsuch (32 saves / 34 shots)		Goalie stats	Alex Blankenburg (28 saves / 29 shots)

April 26	Michigan Warriors	4 – 0	Port Huron Fighting Falcons	Dort Financial Center
No scoring		First period	No scoring
0:40 - Tyler Groat (5)		Second period	No scoring
3:15 - T.J. Stuntz (3); 18:22 - en - T.J. Stuntz (4); 18:32 - Zack Szajner (3)		Third period	No scoring
Trevor Gorsuch (33 saves / 33 shots)		Goalie stats	Max Milosek (32 saves / 35 shots)

Michigan wins series 3 – 1

=== South Division ===
==== (S1) Amarillo Bulls vs. (S2) Topeka RoadRunners ====
April 18	Amarillo Bulls	2 – 3	Topeka RoadRunners	Amarillo Civic Center
10:34 - Roman Ammirato (2); 13:05 - Roman Ammirato (3)		First period	Tyler Poulsen (2) - 1:13; Sam Rennaker (1) - 19:47
No scoring		Second period	Mike Gornall (1) - 6:18
No scoring		Third period	No scoring
Paul Berrafato (27 saves / 30 shots)		Goalie stats	P.J. Bridges (23 saves / 25 shots)

April 19	Amarillo Bulls	1 – 3	Topeka RoadRunners	Amarillo Civic Center
0:24 - pp - Brendan Vetter (2)		First period	No scoring
No scoring		Second period	Mike Gornall (2) - pp - 17:32
No scoring		Third period	Yu Hikosaka (2) - 11:32; Tyler Poulsen (3) - en - 19:59
Collin Delia (33 saves / 35 shots)		Goalie stats	P.J. Bridges (32 saves / 33 shots)

April 24	Topeka RoadRunners	2 – 3	OT	Amarillo Bulls	Stormont Vail Events Center
6:16 - Daniel Rzavský (1)		First period		No scoring
1:34 - Tyler Poulsen (4)		Second period		Kyle Gattelaro (3) - 9:07
No scoring		Third period		Ben Jentsch (1) - 14:05
No scoring		First overtime period		Tyler Gernhofer (3) - 6:10
P.J. Bridges (29 saves / 32 shots)		Goalie stats		Collin Delia (33 saves / 35 shots)

April 25	Topeka RoadRunners	2 – 5	Amarillo Bulls	Stormont Vail Events Center
13:28 - pp- Cody Champagne (1)		First period	No scoring
No scoring		Second period	Brady Ferguson (3) - 6:15; Eric Purcell (3) - 16:00
0:46 - Daniel Rzavský (2)		Third period	Mitchell McPherson (1) - 1:05; Mitch Vanderburg (1) - 2:35; Mitchell McPherson (2) - 12:53
P.J. Bridges (26 saves / 31 shots)		Goalie stats	Collin Delia (30 saves / 32 shots)

April 28	Amarillo Bulls	2 – 6	Topeka RoadRunners	Amarillo Civic Center
12:28 - pp - Mike Davis (3)		First period	James Ring (2) - 16:10; Yu Hikosaka (2) - 18:38
No scoring		Second period	Sly Sutter (1) - 2:38; Yu Hikosaka (3) - 8:45
16:07 - Mike Davis (4)		Third period	Jerad Tafoya (1) - 14:56; Tyler Poulsen (5) - en - 18:22
Collin Delia (19 saves / 22 shots); Paul Berrafato (21 saves / 23 shots)		Goalie stats	P.J. Bridges (27 saves / 29 shots)

Topeka wins series 3 – 2

== Semifinals ==
=== (MW1) Fairbanks Ice Dogs vs. (N2) Michigan Warriors ===
May 2	Fairbanks Ice Dogs	3 – 1	Michigan Warriors	Big Dipper Ice Arena
10:36 - pp - Jacob Hetz (2); 13:23 - Yannick Vedel (3); 16:39 - Yannick Vedel (4)		First period	No scoring
No scoring		Second period	No scoring
No scoring		Third period	Jake Hopfner (1) - 10:30
Kevin Aldridge (30 saves / 31 shots)		Goalie stats	Trevor Gorsuch (32 saves / 35 shots)

April 5	Fairbanks Ice Dogs	3 – 0	Michigan Warriors	Big Dipper Ice Arena
No scoring		First period	No scoring
18:13 - pp - Lonnie Clary (2); 19:56 - Brett Gervais (2)		Second period	No scoring
18:25 - en - Tayler Munson (3)		Third period	No scoring
Kevin Aldridge (21 saves / 21 shots)		Goalie stats	Trevor Gorsuch (31 saves / 33 shots)

Fairbanks wins series 2 – 0

=== (C1) Austin Bruins vs. (S2) Topeka RoadRunners ===
May 2	Topeka RoadRunners	7 – 5	Austin Bruins	Kansas Expocentre
Mike Gornall (3) - 2:26; Tyler Poulsen (5) - 11:37; Jasen Fernsler (3) - 12:19		First period	5:50 - Cory Dunn (1); 8:59 - Alex Pettersson (1); 19:46 - Josh Bretner (1)
Cody Champagne (2) - 10:46		Second period	15:30 - Niko Hildenbrand (3)
Jerad Tafoya (2) - 3:42; Jerad Tafoya (3) - 4:08; Jake Kamrass (3) - en - 19:34		Third period	13:40 - Brian Bachnak (2)
P.J. Bridges (28 saves / 33 shots)		Goalie stats	Nick Lehr (34 saves / 40 shots)

May 3	Topeka RoadRunners	4 – 6	Austin Bruins	Kansas Expocentre
No scoring		First period	5:05 - Luke Dietsch (5)
Jake Kamrass (4) - 4:41		Second period	1:52 - Brian Bachnak (2); 6:21 - Luke Dietsch (6)
Jasen Fernsler (5) - pp - 0:58; Jasen Fernsler (6) - 9:35; James Ring (3) - pp - 19:59		Third period	4:33 - Casey Jerry (3); 10:38 - Joe Schuldt (1); 18:12 - en - Niko Hildenbrand (4)
P.J. Bridges (24 saves / 29 shots)		Goalie stats	Nick Lehr (29 saves / 33 shots)

April 21	Topeka RoadRunners	3 – 4	OT	Austin Bruins	Kansas Expocentre
No scoring		First period		No scoring
8:02 - Jasen Fernsler (7)		Second period		Niko Hildenbrand (5) - 13:53
10:35 - Tomas Nechala (1); 18:33 - pp - Tyler Poulsen (7)		Third period		Brian Bachnak (2) - 7:58; Joe Schuldt (2) - 14:48
No scoring		First overtime period		Drew Anderson (3) - 2:07
P.J. Bridges (21 saves / 25 shots)		Goalie stats		Nick Lehr (29 saves / 32 shots)

Austin wins series 2 – 1

== Robertson Cup Finals ==
=== (MW1) Fairbanks Ice Dogs vs. (C1) Austin Bruins ===
May 9	Fairbanks Ice Dogs	5 – 4	OT	Austin Bruins	Big Dipper Ice Arena
No scoring		First period		Drew Anderson (4) - 18:46
9:50 - Jacob Hetz (3); 13:14 - Hans Gorowsky (4); 18:26 - Lonnie Clary (3)		Second period		Jay Dickman (4) - 14:34
2:35 - Tayler Munson (4)		Third period		Sam Kauppila (4) - 3:14; Jay Dickman (5) - 17:31
5:12 - Tayler Munson (5)		First overtime period		No scoring
Kevin Aldridge (31 saves / 35 shots)		Goalie stats		Nick Lehr (29 saves / 34 shots)

May 10	Fairbanks Ice Dogs	6 – 2	Austin Bruins	Big Dipper Ice Arena
15:38 - pp - Viktor Liljegren (4)		First period	Jay Dickman (6) - pp - 7:52
4:40 - Colton Wolter (3); 8:16 - Viktor Liljegren (5); 13:17 - pp - Duggie Lagrone (1)		Second period	No scoring
3:20 - Colton Wolter (4); 18:14 - en - Jacob Hetz (4)		Third period	Niko Hildenbrand (6) - 15:03
Kevin Aldridge (19 saves / 21 shots)		Goalie stats	Nick Lehr (22 saves / 27 shots)

Fairbanks wins series 2 – 0
