= 2016–17 NAHL season =

- League: North American Hockey League
- Sport: Ice hockey
- Duration: Regular season September 9, 2016 – April 10, 2017; Postseason; April 14 – May 14, 2017
- Games: 60
- Teams: 24

Draft
- Top draft pick: David Tomeo
- Picked by: Northeast Generals

Regular season
- Season champions: Aston Rebels
- Season MVP: Mareks Mitens (Aston Rebels)
- Top scorer: Chase Thudium (Odessa Jackalopes)

Robertson Cup Playoffs
- Finals champions: Lone Star Brahmas
- Runners-up: Aston Rebels

NAHL seasons
- ← 2015–16 2017–18 →

The 2016–17 NAHL season was the 33rd season of the North American Hockey League. The regular season ran from September 2016 to April 2017 with a 60-game schedule for each team. The Aston Rebels won the regular season championship and advanced to the Championship game where they were defeated by the Lone Star Brahmas who captured the Robertson Cup.

== Member changes ==
- On October 22, 2015, the NAHL approved the addition of the Shreveport Mudbugs as an expansion franchise. As the Hirsch Memorial Coliseum was undergoing renovations at the time to include an ice surface once more, the team would be ready to play for this season.
- At the beginning of April, the Northeast Generals of the North American 3 Eastern Hockey League were permitted to found a separate Tier II team that would begin play in the NAHL this season.

== Regular season ==
The standings at the end of the regular season were as follows:

Note: x = clinched playoff berth; y = clinched division title; z = clinched regular season title

=== Standings ===
==== Central Division ====
Team	GP	W	L	OTL	SOL	Pts	GF	GA
xy – Minot Minotauros	60	38	18	4	0	80	192	156
x – Minnesota Wilderness	60	32	22	4	2	70	188	179
x – Brookings Blizzard	60	30	25	4	1	65	192	193
x – Aberdeen Wings	60	29	24	3	4	65	184	185
Bismarck Bobcats	60	28	30	1	1	58	187	209
Austin Bruins	60	24	27	4	5	57	185	202

==== East Division ====
Team	GP	W	L	OTL	SOL	Pts	GF	GA
xyz – Aston Rebels	60	46	11	2	1	95	214	106
x – Johnstown Tomahawks	60	40	16	3	1	84	209	148
x – New Jersey Titans	60	34	22	1	3	72	228	198
x – Wilkes-Barre/Scranton Knights	60	30	25	1	4	65	201	193
Northeast Generals	60	4	53	3	0	11	116	305

==== Midwest Division ====
Team	GP	W	L	OTL	SOL	Pts	GF	GA
xy – Janesville Jets	60	42	13	1	4	89	224	153
x – Fairbanks Ice Dogs	60	33	24	2	1	69	185	165
x – Minnesota Magicians	60	31	22	4	3	69	180	169
x – Coulee Region Chill	60	31	27	2	0	64	220	220
Springfield Jr. Blues	60	27	28	4	1	59	174	189
Kenai River Brown Bears	60	12	46	2	0	26	121	233

==== South Division ====
Team	GP	W	L	OTL	SOL	Pts	GF	GA
xy – Lone Star Brahmas	60	44	14	2	0	90	190	135
x – Shreveport Mudbugs	60	35	19	3	3	76	189	151
x – Corpus Christi IceRays	60	32	19	4	5	73	183	155
x – Wichita Falls Wildcats	60	29	24	6	2	65	187	203
Odessa Jackalopes	60	26	25	4	3	61	183	200
Amarillo Bulls	60	22	28	8	2	54	173	206
Topeka RoadRunners	60	21	34	4	1	47	176	228

=== Statistics ===
==== Scoring leaders ====
The following players led the league in regular season points at the completion of all regular season games.

Player	Team	GP	G	A	Pts	PIM
Chase Thudium	Odessa Jackalopes	59	27	43	70	111
George Mika	Amarillo Bulls	60	30	39	69	34
Caleb Schroer	Coulee Region Chill	59	26	41	67	66
Nick Bruce	Johnstown Tomahawks	60	27	40	67	126
Dalton Hunter	Johnstown Tomahawks	58	30	31	61	63
Paul Cotter	Brookings Blizzard	59	28	32	60	103
Justin Misiak	Austin Bruins	60	25	35	60	50
Kevin Dineen	Coulee Region Chill	58	20	39	59	36
Kevin Fitzgerald	Aberdeen Wings	60	22	37	59	62
Mitchel Slattery	Minnesota Magicians	54	20	39	59	106
Matt Barry	Bismarck Bobcats	59	23	36	59	26

==== Leading goaltenders ====
Note: GP = Games played; Mins = Minutes played; W = Wins; L = Losses; OTL = Overtime losses; SOL = Shootout losses; SO = Shutouts; GAA = Goals against average; SV% = Save percentage

Player	Team	GP	Mins	W	L	OTL	SOL	GA	SV	SV%	GAA
Mareks Mitens	Aston Rebels	41	2332:59	31	10	0	0	63	839	.925	1.62
Jack Leavy	Aston Rebels	20	1122:40	13	1	2	1	34	425	.920	1.82
Erik Gordon	Lone Star/Fairbanks	32	1752:39	24	3	0	0	55	753	.927	1.88
Jacob Barczewski	Janesville Jets	35	1986:46	27	6	0	1	64	906	.929	1.93
Alec Calvaruso	Lone Star Brahmas	36	1830:42	24	7	0	0	65	660	.902	2.13

== Robertson Cup playoffs ==
Teams are reseeded prior to the semifinal round based upon regular season records.

Division Semifinals (Best-of-5)
C1	Minot Minotauros	1	1	7	2	-
C4	Aberdeen Wings	3	3	1	3**	-
Central Division
C2	Minnesota Wilderness	1	4	6	3	6
C3	Brookings Blizzard	4	2	3	4*	3
E1	Aston Rebels	3	2	7	-	-
E4	Wilkes-Barre/Scranton Knights	1	1	5	-	-
East Division
E2	Johnstown Tomahawks	1	0	2	-	-
E3	New Jersey Titans	3	1	3*	-	-
MW1	Janesville Jets	3	3**	4*	-	-
MW4	Coulee Region Chill	2	2	3	-	-
Midwest Division
MW2	Fairbanks Ice Dogs	2	4	7	-	-
MW3	Minnesota Magicians	1	1	2	-	-
S1	Lone Star Brahmas	3	7	4*	-	-
S4	Wichita Falls Wildcats	0	3	3	-	-
South Division
S2	Shreveport Mudbugs	0	3	1	-	-
S3	Corpus Christi IceRays	2	5	2*	-	-

Division Finals (Best-of-5)
C4	Aberdeen Wings	4**	2	1	5	1*
C2	Minnesota Wilderness	3	3	4	2	0
E1	Aston Rebels	5	3	0	2	6
E3	New Jersey Titans	2	2	4	3*	2
MW1	Janesville Jets	4	5	1	5	-
MW2	Fairbanks Ice Dogs	1	0	3*	2	-
S1	Lone Star Brahmas	4*	0	1	3*	1*
S3	Corpus Christi IceRays	3	3	4	2	0

Semifinal (Best-of-3)
1	Aston Rebels	4	2	2*
4	Aberdeen Wings	2	3*	1
2	Lone Star Brahmas	3*	3	-
3	Janesville Jets	2	1	-

Championship (Best-of-1)
1	Aston Rebels	0
2	Lone Star Brahmas	3

Note: * denotes overtime period(s)
