= 2017–18 NAHL season =

- League: North American Hockey League
- Sport: Ice hockey
- Duration: Regular season September 13, 2017 – April 9, 2018; Postseason; April 13 – May 14, 2018
- Games: 60
- Teams: 23

Regular season
- Season champions: Fairbanks Ice Dogs
- Season MVP: Jakov Novak (Janesville Jets)
- Top scorer: Jakov Novak (Janesville Jets)

Robertson Cup Playoffs
- Robertson Cup Playoffs MVP: Jaxon Castor (Mudbugs)
- Finals champions: Shreveport Mudbugs
- Runners-up: Minot Minotauros

NAHL seasons
- ← 2016–17 2018–19 →

The 2017–18 NAHL season was the 34th season of the North American Hockey League. The regular season ran from September 2017 to April 2018 with a 60-game schedule for each team. The Fairbanks Ice Dogs won the regular season championship. The Shreveport Mudbugs defeated the Minot Minotauros 2–1 in the Championship game to capture the Robertson Cup.

== Member changes ==
- In May 2017, the Wichita Falls Wildcats applied for inactive status after their owner had failed to find anyone willing to purchase the franchise. Following this season, the team was formally dissolved.
- On July 24, 2017, the Aston Rebels announced that they were moving to Philadelphia and would use the Class of 1923 Arena as their new home rink. The team would now be known as the Philadelphia Rebels.

=== Brown Bears saved ===
Due to a persistent economic challenges in Alaska, the Kenai River Brown Bears announced that they would either be folding or relocating in 2017. After the team filed for dormancy after the '17 season, a fundraising effort was held that eventually raised $300,000 as well as secured 300 season ticket applications. By April 17, the team received approval from the NAHL to reactivate in time to compete in this season.

== Regular season ==
The standings at the end of the regular season were as follows:

Note: x = clinched playoff berth; y = clinched division title; z = clinched regular season title

=== Standings ===
==== Central Division ====
| Team | GP | W | L | OTL | SOL | Pts | GF | GA |
|---|---|---|---|---|---|---|---|---|
| xy – Aberdeen Wings | 60 | 39 | 16 | 4 | 1 | 83 | 194 | 140 |
| x – Austin Bruins | 60 | 33 | 19 | 4 | 4 | 74 | 176 | 160 |
| x – Minnesota Wilderness | 60 | 33 | 21 | 3 | 3 | 72 | 184 | 181 |
| x – Minot Minotauros | 60 | 28 | 26 | 4 | 2 | 62 | 161 | 168 |
| Bismarck Bobcats | 60 | 24 | 30 | 4 | 2 | 54 | 165 | 184 |
| Brookings Blizzard | 60 | 23 | 30 | 2 | 5 | 53 | 169 | 211 |

==== East Division ====
| Team | GP | W | L | OTL | SOL | Pts | GF | GA |
|---|---|---|---|---|---|---|---|---|
| xy – Philadelphia Rebels | 60 | 41 | 15 | 3 | 1 | 86 | 206 | 134 |
| x – New Jersey Titans | 60 | 29 | 22 | 7 | 2 | 67 | 203 | 183 |
| x – Wilkes-Barre/Scranton Knights | 60 | 30 | 24 | 5 | 1 | 66 | 175 | 196 |
| x – Northeast Generals | 60 | 29 | 26 | 4 | 1 | 63 | 184 | 205 |
| Johnstown Tomahawks | 60 | 23 | 33 | 2 | 2 | 50 | 142 | 195 |

==== Midwest Division ====
| Team | GP | W | L | OTL | SOL | Pts | GF | GA |
|---|---|---|---|---|---|---|---|---|
| xyz – Fairbanks Ice Dogs | 60 | 45 | 8 | 4 | 3 | 97 | 223 | 125 |
| x – Janesville Jets | 60 | 38 | 13 | 6 | 3 | 85 | 181 | 140 |
| x – Springfield Jr. Blues | 60 | 33 | 21 | 5 | 1 | 72 | 169 | 166 |
| x – Minnesota Magicians | 60 | 28 | 24 | 5 | 3 | 64 | 164 | 183 |
| Coulee Region Chill | 60 | 17 | 34 | 4 | 5 | 43 | 162 | 214 |
| Kenai River Brown Bears | 60 | 18 | 38 | 1 | 3 | 40 | 153 | 238 |

==== South Division ====
| Team | GP | W | L | OTL | SOL | Pts | GF | GA |
|---|---|---|---|---|---|---|---|---|
| xy – Shreveport Mudbugs | 60 | 41 | 12 | 3 | 4 | 89 | 191 | 112 |
| x – Lone Star Brahmas | 60 | 38 | 12 | 6 | 4 | 86 | 164 | 111 |
| x – Odessa Jackalopes | 60 | 33 | 22 | 3 | 2 | 71 | 192 | 263 |
| x – Corpus Christi IceRays | 60 | 27 | 23 | 5 | 5 | 64 | 160 | 177 |
| Amarillo Bulls | 60 | 23 | 26 | 8 | 3 | 57 | 166 | 193 |
| Topeka RoadRunners | 60 | 17 | 39 | 2 | 2 | 38 | 128 | 233 |

=== Statistics ===
==== Scoring leaders ====
The following players led the league in regular season points at the completion of all regular season games.

| Player | Team | GP | G | A | Pts | PIM |
|---|---|---|---|---|---|---|
| Jakov Novak | Janesville Jets | 56 | 32 | 41 | 73 | 131 |
| Travis Kothenbeutel | Austin Bruins | 56 | 24 | 43 | 67 | 26 |
| Hunter Wendt | Fairbanks Ice Dogs | 60 | 17 | 44 | 61 | 44 |
| Kip Hoffmann | Janesville Jets | 58 | 24 | 36 | 60 | 78 |
| Josh Boyer | Brookings Blizzard | 58 | 27 | 31 | 58 | 50 |
| Sam Ruffin | Fairbanks Ice Dogs | 57 | 20 | 37 | 57 | 16 |
| Nathan Burke | Aberdeen Wings | 60 | 32 | 24 | 56 | 18 |
| Ricky Carballo | Aberdeen/Odessa | 59 | 20 | 36 | 56 | 79 |
| Erkka Vänskä | Fairbanks Ice Dogs | 60 | 19 | 36 | 55 | 18 |
| Miroslav Mucha | Minot Minotauros | 59 | 30 | 25 | 55 | 28 |

==== Leading goaltenders ====
Note: GP = Games played; Mins = Minutes played; W = Wins; L = Losses; OTL = Overtime losses; SOL = Shootout losses; SO = Shutouts; GAA = Goals against average; SV% = Save percentage

| Player | Team | GP | Mins | W | L | OTL | SOL | GA | SV | SV% | GAA |
|---|---|---|---|---|---|---|---|---|---|---|---|
| James Durham | Shreveport Mudbugs | 19 | 1122:42 | 14 | 2 | 1 | 1 | 40 | 497 | .942 | 1.55 |
| Mitch Gibson | Lone Star Brahmas | 43 | 2474:03 | 26 | 7 | 5 | 4 | 65 | 1,019 | .936 | 1.58 |
| Josh Benson | Fairbanks Ice Dogs | 37 | 2253:53 | 28 | 4 | 3 | 2 | 71 | 868 | .918 | 1.89 |
| Ryan Keane | Philadelphia Rebels | 33 | 1966:48 | 24 | 7 | 2 | 0 | 62 | 819 | .924 | 1.89 |
| Gustavs Dāvis Grigals | Shreveport Mudbugs | 26 | 1557:29 | 17 | 5 | 3 | 1 | 50 | 663 | .925 | 1.93 |

== Robertson Cup playoffs ==
Teams are reseeded prior to the semifinal round based upon regular season records.

Division Semifinals (Best-of-5)
C1 | Aberdeen Wings | 6 | 0 | 4 | 1 | 0
C4 | Minot Minotauros | 0 | 2 | 1 | 3 | 3
Central Division
C2 | Austin Bruins | 2 | 3 | 2 | 5 | -
C3 | Minnesota Wilderness | 1 | 1 | 3 | 3 | -
E1 | Philadelphia Rebels | 5 | 5 | 0 | 1 | 4***
E4 | Northeast Generals | 0 | 1 | 3 | 3 | 3
East Division
E2 | New Jersey Titans | 0 | 4 | 5 | 1 | 2
E3 | Wilkes-Barre/Scranton Knights | 1 | 3 | 2 | 5 | 5
MW1 | Fairbanks Ice Dogs | 4 | 3 | 4 | - | -
MW4 | Minnesota Magicians | 3 | 2 | 2 | - | -
Midwest Division
MW2 | Janesville Jets | 3 | 3 | 1 | - | -
MW3 | Springfield Jr. Blues | 0 | 2 | 0 | - | -
S1 | Shreveport Mudbugs | 4 | 3 | 1 | 2 | 2
S4 | Corpus Christi IceRays | 2 | 2 | 5 | 3* | 1
South Division
S2 | Lone Star Brahmas | 3 | 2 | 4 | - | -
S3 | Odessa Jackalopes | 1 | 1 | 1 | - | -

Division Finals (Best-of-5)
C4 | Minot Minotauros | 4 | 3* | 2** | - | -
C2 | Austin Bruins | 1 | 2 | 1 | - | -
E1 | Philadelphia Rebels | 1 | 4 | 1 | - | -
E3 | Wilkes-Barre/Scranton Knights | 4 | 5 | 2 | - | -
MW1 | Fairbanks Ice Dogs | 4 | 3 | 2 | 4 | 1
MW2 | Janesville Jets | 6 | 2 | 3* | 2 | 0
S1 | Shreveport Mudbugs | 1 | 2 | 1 | 1 | 3
S2 | Lone Star Brahmas | 0 | 1 | 2* | 3 | 2

Semifinal (Best-of-3)
1 | Fairbanks Ice Dogs | 5 | 0 | 4
4 | Minot Minotauros | 2 | 2 | 5*
2 | Shreveport Mudbugs | 2 | 2 | -
3 | Wilkes-Barre/Scranton Knights | 0 | 1 | -

Championship (Best-of-1)
4 | Minot Minotauros | 1
2 | Shreveport Mudbugs | 2

Note: * denotes overtime period(s)
