= Bradly Nadeau =

Canadian ice hockey player (born 2005)

- Born: May 5, 2005 (age 21) Saint-François-de-Madawaska, New Brunswick, Canada
- Height: 5 ft 11 in (180 cm)
- Weight: 180 lb (82 kg; 12 st 12 lb)
- Position: Left wing
- Shoots: Right
- NHL team (P) Cur. team: Carolina Hurricanes; Chicago Wolves (AHL)
- NHL draft: 30th overall, 2023; Carolina Hurricanes
- Playing career: 2024–present

Bradly Nadeau (born May 5, 2005) is a Canadian professional ice hockey player who is a left winger for the Chicago Wolves of the American Hockey League (AHL) as a prospect for the Carolina Hurricanes of the National Hockey League (NHL). He was drafted 30th overall by the Hurricanes in the 2023 NHL entry draft.

== Playing career ==
=== Early years ===
Nadeau played in the 2018-19 season for the North West Bulls Bantam of the New Brunswick Bantam AAA Hockey League (NBBAAAHL), raking in 44 points on 21 goals and 23 assists in 27 games, placing him 3rd in the points standings at the end of the season. Nadeau returned for the 2019-20 season, this time scoring 78 points on 35 goals and 43 assists in just 27 games, leading the league in assists, points, and points per game (2.89). Nadeau was included in the First All-Star team for the NBBAAAHL in the 19-20 season, and won the regular season MVP award. During the 2022–23 season, Nadeau led the Penticton Vees to their second consecutive Fred Page Cup championship awarded to the British Columbia Hockey League (BCHL) playoff winner. He led the league in scoring with 113 points on 45 goals and 68 assists in 54 games and added 17 goals and 18 assists in 17 playoff games. He led the league in goals, assists, points-per game (2.09), power-play goals (18) and game-winning goals (10). Following an outstanding season he was awarded the Brett Hull Trophy, as the league's top scorer, the Vern Dye Memorial Trophy, as regular season MVP, and the Jeff Tambellini Trophy as playoff MVP. Nadeau was selected in the first round, 30th overall, by the Carolina Hurricanes in the 2023 NHL entry draft.

=== College ===
Nadeau committed to play college ice hockey for the Maine Black Bears during the 2023–24 season. In his freshman year, Nadeau led his team in scoring with 19 goals and 27 assists in 37 games and helped lead Maine to the 2024 NCAA tournament for the first time in 12 years. However, the Black Bears lost to Cornell in the first round. He ranked sixth in points and fifth in goals and points per game (1.24) among all freshmen. Following the season, he was named to the All-Hockey East Second Team, and the All-Hockey East Rookie Team, and was nominated for the Hobey Baker Award.

=== Professional ===
On April 7, 2024, Nadeau signed a three-year, entry-level contract with the Carolina Hurricanes. He made his NHL debut in the Hurricanes' final game of the 2023–24 season, a 6–3 loss to the Columbus Blue Jackets.

Nadeau spent most of the 2024–25 season with the Hurricanes' AHL affiliate Chicago Wolves. Scoring 32 goals, he became only the fifth player in league history to reach the 30-goal mark before their 20th birthday. He was second among all rookies in points, and first in goals. Nadeau was named to the AHL All-Rookie Team.

== International play ==
On December 13, 2024, Nadeau was selected to represent Canada at the 2025 World Junior Ice Hockey Championships.

== Personal life ==
Nadeau's father, John, played ice hockey for the Haut-Madawaska Panthères in the New Brunswick Regional Hockey League senior men's league before retiring in 2022. Bradly's older brother, Josh, is also an ice hockey player at Maine.

== Career statistics ==
=== Regular season and playoffs ===
			Regular season					Playoffs
Season	Team	League	GP	G	A	Pts	PIM	GP	G	A	Pts	PIM
2018–19	North West Bulls Bantam	Bantam AAA	27	21	23	44	16	5	3	0	3	4
2019–20	North West Bulls Bantam	Bantam AAA	27	35	43	78	28	—	—	—	—	—
2019–20	Fredericton Caps	Midget AAA	6	0	1	1	0	—	—	—	—	—
2020–21	Fredericton Caps	Midget AAA	14	9	11	20	4	10	4	7	1	0
2021–22	Penticton Vees	BCHL	49	20	26	46	12	17	11	13	24	2
2022–23	Penticton Vees	BCHL	54	45	68	113	20	17	17	18	35	4
2023–24	University of Maine	HE	37	19	27	46	12	—	—	—	—	—
2023–24	Carolina Hurricanes	NHL	1	0	0	0	0	—	—	—	—	—
2024–25	Chicago Wolves	AHL	64	32	26	58	36	2	0	0	0	0
2024–25	Carolina Hurricanes	NHL	2	0	1	1	0	—	—	—	—	—
2025–26	Chicago Wolves	AHL	52	27	29	56	24	21	7	10	17	38
2025–26	Carolina Hurricanes	NHL	12	3	0	3	2	—	—	—	—	—
NHL totals			15	3	1	4	2	—	—	—	—	—

=== International ===
Year	Team	Event	Result	GP	G	A	Pts	PIM
2025	Canada	WJC	5th	5	2	0	2	0
Junior totals				5	2	0	2	0

== Awards and honours ==
Award	Year	Ref
BCHL
Brett Hull Trophy	2023	
Vern Dye Memorial Trophy	2023	
Jeff Tambellini Trophy	2023	
College
All-Hockey East Second Team	2024	
Hockey East All-Rookie Team	2024	
AHL
All-Rookie Team	2025	

Awards and achievements
Preceded by Seth Jarvis	Carolina Hurricanes first-round draft pick 2023	Succeeded by Incumbent
