= Aydar Suniev =

Russian ice hockey player (born 2004)

- Born: 16 November 2004 (age 21) Kazan, Tatarstan, Russia
- Height: 6 ft 2 in (188 cm)
- Weight: 198 lb (90 kg; 14 st 2 lb)
- Position: Left wing
- Shoots: Left
- NHL team: Calgary Flames
- NHL draft: 80th overall, 2023; Calgary Flames
- Playing career: 2025–present

Aydar Suniev (Russian: Айдар Суниев; born 16 November 2004) is a Russian professional ice hockey left winger for the Calgary Flames of the National Hockey League (NHL). He was selected by the Flames 80th overall in the 2023 NHL entry draft.

== Playing career ==
Suniev originally played as a youth within CSKA Moscow before moving to North America to continue his development as a junior. Following his second season with the Penticton Vees in the British Columbia Hockey League (BCHL), Suniev was selected in the third-round, 80th overall, by the Calgary Flames in the 2023 NHL entry draft.

Suniev committed to the University of Massachusetts-Amherst of the Hockey East beginning as a freshman in the 2023–24 season.

After a standout sophomore season in 2024–25, in which he placed second on the Minutemen in scoring with 20 goals and 38 points through 35 appearances. Suniev opted to conclude his collegiate career in signing a three-year, entry-level contract with the Calgary Flames on 2 April 2025. Joining the Flames roster, Suniev was inserted into the lineup and made his NHL debut in the final regular season game, helping Calgary to a 5–1 victory over the Los Angeles Kings on 17 April 2025.

== Personal life ==
Aydar has four siblings, Askar, Arlan, Aysella, and Madina. Suniev came to North America at fourteen. He initially lived with his mother before she returned to Russia. He then stayed with a billet family. Later, he attended boarding schools. Suniev's parents were motivated to send him to the US due to educational opportunities.

== Career statistics ==
			Regular season					Playoffs
Season	Team	League	GP	G	A	Pts	PIM	GP	G	A	Pts	PIM
2021–22	St. Andrew's College	CAHS	11	13	10	23	2	—	—	—	—	—
2021–22	Thorold Blackhawks	GOJHL	3	5	3	8	4	—	—	—	—	—
2021–22	Penticton Vees	BCHL	17	9	11	20	2	10	2	2	4	4
2022–23	Penticton Vees	BCHL	50	45	45	90	44	15	9	14	23	16
2023–24	UMass-Amherst	HE	36	12	13	25	25	—	—	—	—	—
2024–25	UMass-Amherst	HE	35	20	18	38	41	—	—	—	—	—
2024–25	Calgary Flames	NHL	1	0	0	0	0	—	—	—	—	—
2025–26	Calgary Wranglers	AHL	57	16	8	24	14	—	—	—	—	—
2025–26	Calgary Flames	NHL	6	0	1	1	2	—	—	—	—	—
NHL totals			7	0	1	1	2	—	—	—	—	—

== Awards and honours ==
Award	Year
BCHL
All-Rookie Team	2023
First Team All-Star	2023
