= Wilkes-Barre/Scranton Knights =

- City: Pittston, Pennsylvania
- League: United States Premier Hockey League; National Collegiate Development Conference
- Conference: Atlantic
- Founded: 2005 (organization)
- Home arena: Revolution Ice Centre
- Colors: Navy and white
- General manager: Ray Welsh
- Affiliate: Wilkes-Barre/Scranton Knights (Tier III)

Franchise history
- 1st franchise
- 2010–2012: Dawson Creek Rage
- 2015–2020: Wilkes-Barre/Scranton Knights
- 2020–present: Danbury Jr. Hat Tricks
- 2nd franchise
- 2022–present: Wilkes-Barre/Scranton Knights

The Wilkes-Barre/Scranton Knights are a Tier II junior ice hockey who are currently members of the United States Premier Hockey League's (USPHL) National Collegiate Development Conference (NCDC). The Knights play their home games at the Revolution Ice Centre in Pittston, Pennsylvania.

== History ==
=== NAHL years (2015–2020) ===
On May 1, 2015, it was announced that the Knights had purchased the dormant Dawson Creek Rage franchise in the North American Hockey League and began play as a Tier II team in the 2015–16 NAHL season while also dropping their Tier III teams. The organization would re-add Tier III teams in the EHL in 2017. In 2019, the Tier III team left the EHL and joined the NAHL's Tier III league, the North American 3 Hockey League (NA3HL), but were removed from the league prior to playing a game.

On May 11, 2020, the Knights announced they had sold their franchise rights to an organization in Danbury, Connecticut, and became the Danbury Jr. Hat Tricks.

=== USPHL (2022–present) ===
In February 2021, the Knights announced they would be reactivating their junior teams in the Premier and Elite Divisions of the United States Premier Hockey League, an independently sanctioned league, in the 2021–22 season. During their first season in the USPHL, they announced they would be adding a tuition-free National Collegiate Development Conference (NCDC) team, the USPHL's equivalent of a Tier II league, for the 2022–23 season.

== Season-by-season records ==
Season	GP	W	L	OTL	SOL	Pts	GF	GA	Finish	Playoffs
North American Hockey League
2015–16	60	22	28	10	–	54	150	232	4th of 4, East Div. 20th of 22, NAHL	Lost Div. Semifinal series, 0–3 (Aston Rebels)
2016–17	60	30	25	1	4	65	193	190	4th of 5, East Div. 12th of 24, NAHL	Lost Div. Semifinal series, 0–3 (Aston Rebels)
2017–18	60	30	24	5	1	66	175	196	3rd of 5, East Div. 12th of 23, NAHL	Won Div. Semifinal series, 3–2 (New Jersey Titans); Won Div. Final series, 3–0 (Philadelphia Rebels); Lost Robertson Cup Semifinal series, 0–2 (Shreveport Mudbugs)
2018–19	60	26	29	4	1	57	153	175	5th of 6, East Div. 18th of 24, NAHL	did not qualify
2019–20	53	26	22	4	1	57	165	181	3rd of 7, East Div. 14th of 26, NAHL	Postseason cancelled
National Collegiate Development Conference
2022–23	50	17	28	2	3	39	138	190	7th of 7, South Div. 13th of 14, NCDC	Did not qualify
2023–24	52	20	25	6	1	47	127	177	6th of 6, Atlantic Div. 15th of 18, NCDC	Did not qualify
2024–25	54	18	30	4	2	42	118	195	6th of 7, Atlantic Div. 16th of 22, NCDC	Did not qualify
2025–26	54	25	23	2	4	56	141	151	5th of 7, Atlantic Div. 18th of 33, NCDC	Lost Div Play In 1-2 (Mercer Chiefs)

== See also ==
- Wilkes-Barre/Scranton Penguins
