= Shreveport Mudbugs =

- City: Shreveport, Louisiana
- League: North American Hockey League
- Founded: 2016
- Home arena: Hirsch Memorial Coliseum
- Colors: Black, teal, purple, red, white
- Owners: Tommy & Leslie Scott
- General manager: Scott Muscutt
- Head coach: Jason Campbell
- Asst. coach: Brett Smith
- Media: The Shreveport-Bossier City Advocate

Franchise history
- 2016–present: Shreveport Mudbugs

Championships
- Robertson Cups: 2 (2018, 2021)

The Shreveport Mudbugs are a Tier II junior ice hockey team based in Shreveport, Louisiana, as a member of the North American Hockey League. The new Mudbugs replaced a former professional team that played in the area from 1997 to 2011 known as the Bossier-Shreveport Mudbugs. They also have multiple youth teams playing in both Louisiana and Texas.

== History ==
From 1997 to 2000, Shreveport, Louisiana was home to a professional hockey team in the Western Professional Hockey League (WPHL) named the Shreveport Mudbugs. In 2000, the Mudbugs relocated to nearby Bossier City to play out of CenturyTel Center and changed their name to the Bossier-Shreveport Mudbugs. The Mudbugs then joined the Central Hockey League in 2001 when the WPHL merged with the CHL. The professional Mudbugs would eventually fold in 2011 citing low attendance and financial issues even though the team had just won the league championship.

In October 2015, it was announced that a new Mudbugs team would return for the 2016–17 season after signing a 12-year lease agreement with the Louisiana State Fairgrounds and returning to Hirsch Coliseum but as a member of the Tier II junior North American Hockey League. On April 8, 2016, the Shreveport Mudbugs were officially announced as an expansion team in the NAHL. Former Bossier-Shreveport Mudbugs player, Karlis Zirnis, was named the team's first head coach.

In their second season, the Mudbugs finished first in the South Division at the end of the regular season and played their way through the Robertson Cup playoffs to take the NAHL championship in 2018. Following the season, head coach Zirnis left the team to take an assistant coaching position with the University of Alaska-Fairbanks hockey team.

== Longest playoff game in NAHL history ==
On April 22, 2023, the Shreveport Mudbugs traveled to North Richland Hills, Texas to play the Lone Star Brahmas for Game 1 of the South Division semifinals. At 7:30 pm CT, the puck was dropped. At 1:38 am the next day, the game finally ended with a 2-1 victory for Lone Star in quadruple overtime. The game was approximately 6 hours and 8 minutes long, making it the longest playoff game in the NAHL. However, the Mudbugs got the last laugh, as they upset the Brahmas in the series, beating them 3 games to 2.

== Season-by-season records ==
Season	GP	W	L	OTL	Pts	GF	GA	PIM	Finish	Playoffs
2016–17	60	35	19	6	76	189	151	1126	2nd of 7, South Div. 6th of 24, NAHL	Lost Div. Semifinals, 0–3 vs. Corpus Christi IceRays
2017–18	60	41	12	7	89	191	112	1163	1st of 6, South Div. 2nd of 23, NAHL	Won Div. Semifinals, 3–2 vs. Corpus Christi IceRays; Won Div. Finals, 3–2 vs. Lone Star Brahmas; Won Robertson Cup Semifinals, 2–0 vs. Wilkes-Barre/Scranton Knights; Won Robertson Cup Championship game, 2–1 vs. Minot Minotauros; Robertson Cup Champions
2018–19	60	28	22	10	66	163	164	1357	3rd of 6, South Div. 12th of 24, NAHL	Won Div. Semifinals, 3–2 vs. Lone Star Brahmas; Lost Div. Finals, 2–3 vs. Amarillo Bulls
2019–20	52	34	18	0	68	164	107	1269	4th of 7, South Div. 9th of 26, NAHL	Season cancelled
2020–21	56	38	11	7	83	205	139	1103	1st of 6, South Div. 3rd of 23, NAHL	Won Div. Semifinals, 3–1 vs. Amarillo Bulls; Won Div. Finals, 3–0 vs. Wichita Falls Warriors; Won Robertson Cup Semifinals, 2–0 vs. Maine Nordiques; Won Robertson Cup Championship game, 4–2 vs. Aberdeen Wings; Robertson Cup Champions
2021–22	60	34	21	5	73	170	154	1168	4th of 8, South Div. 11th of 29, NAHL	Lost Div. Semifinals, 1–3 vs. Lone Star Brahmas
2022–23	60	37	16	7	81	183	135	1057	3rd of 8, South Div. 5th of 29, NAHL	Won Div. Semifinals, 3–2 vs. Lone Star Brahmas; Lost Div. Finals, 0–3 vs. Oklahoma Warriors
2023–24	60	41	17	2	84	208	141	1163	2nd of 8 South, 3rd of 32 NAHL	Won Div. Semifinals, 3-2 vs. El Paso Rhinos; Lost Div. Finals, 1-3 vs. Lone Star Brahmas
2024–25	47	29	15	3	61	151	120	835	2nd of 8 South, 7th of 32 NAHL	Lost Div. Semifinals, 0-3 vs. Corpus Christi IceRays

| 2025-2026 |28| |22| |3| |6| |65| |171| |172| |1420| 5th of 8 south, 9th of 34 NAHL || Won Play-In Series, 2-0 vs. Corpus Christi IceRays
