= Philadelphia Rebels =

- City: Washington Township, Gloucester County, New Jersey
- League: North American Hockey League
- Division: East
- Founded: 2008
- Home arena: Hollydell Ice Arena
- Colors: Blue, red, white
- Owner: HSG Hockey LLC
- General manager: Justin Hale (hired 2022)
- Head coach: Justin Hale (hired 2022)

Franchise history
- 2008–2013: Wenatchee Wild
- 2013–2015: Rio Grande Valley Killer Bees
- 2015–2017: Aston Rebels
- 2017–2018: Philadelphia Rebels
- 2018–2022: Jamestown Rebels
- 2022–present: Philadelphia Rebels

Championships
- Regular season titles: 1 (2016–17)
- Division titles: 3 (2015–16, 2016–17, 2017–18)

The Philadelphia Rebels are a Tier II junior ice hockey team playing in the North American Hockey League (NAHL). The team is based in Hollydell Ice Arena in Washington Township, Gloucester County, New Jersey.

== History ==
The franchise was originally known as the Wenatchee Wild in Wenatchee, Washington, before relocating to Hidalgo, Texas, to become the Rio Grande Valley Killer Bees.

On June 1, 2015, NAHL insiders began reporting the Killer Bees franchise was going to relocate to Philadelphia suburb of Aston, Pennsylvania, and the IceWorks Skating Complex. The Killer Bees would subsequently announce that the team was ceasing operations for the 2015–16 season unless the team president, Gilbert Saenz, could find a local alternative to save the team. However, on June 9, the NAHL announced that the franchise was relocating to become the Aston Rebels. Joe Coombs remains as the head coach. The Rebels were placed in the NAHL's new East Division for their inaugural season.

In 2017, the team relocated to the Class of 1923 Arena at the University of Pennsylvania in nearby Philadelphia and became the Philadelphia Rebels. The Philadelphia Rebels again finished at the top of their division in the regular season before losing to the Wilkes-Barre/Scranton Knights in the division finals of the playoffs. After one season, the Rebels faced poor attendance numbers and scheduling issues. In June 2018, the team was relocated to Northwest Arena in Jamestown, New York and became the Jamestown Rebels. The Rebels are the second NAHL team to play in Jamestown after the Jamestown Ironmen ceased operations in 2013.

Due to the on-going restrictions in the midst of the COVID-19 pandemic in the state of New York, the team suspended operations for the 2020–21 season.

On May 17, 2022, the NAHL announced that it had sold the franchise to another owner and was relocating the Rebels back to suburban Philadelphia, playing out of Hollydell Ice Arena in Washington Township, Gloucester County, New Jersey.

== Players ==
=== Current roster ===
| No. | Name | Pos. | Shoots/Catches | DOB | Height | Weight | Hometown |
|---|---|---|---|---|---|---|---|
| 10 | Abzal Alibek | F | L | 2006-03-29 | 6' 0" | 163 | Astana, Kazakhstan |
| 22 | Caesar Bjork | F | L | 2004-04-11 | 5' 10" | 178 | Tyresö, Sweden |
| 13 | Ryan Bunting | F | L | 2005-03-08 | 5' 9" | 169 | (United States) West Deptford, NJ, USA |
| 28 | Jared Coccimiglio | F | L | 2004-02-02 | 5' 8" | 156 | Oakville, ON, Canada |
| 12 | Linas Dedinas | F | L | 2004-10-11 | 6' 1" | 194 | Vilnius, Lithuania |
| 26 | Brayton Frick | F | L | 2005-11-26 | 5' 7" | 193 | (United States) Willow Street, PA, USA |
| 24 | Ruslan Jamaldinov | F | L | 2005-01-30 | 5' 11" | 181 | Luleå, Sweden |
| 8 | Brock Jones | F | R | 2004-11-15 | 5' 9" | 182 | (United States) Lakeview, OR, USA |
| 29 | Michael Mathison | F | R | 2006-10-24 | 5' 9" | 168 | (United States) Horace, ND, USA |
| 25 | Luke Menard | F | L | 2007-06-24 | 5' 9" | 170 | (United States) Negaunee, MI, USA |
| 27 | Lucas Minard | F | R | 2006-03-07 | 5' 9.5" | 175 | (United States) Keller, TX, USA |
| 9 | Thomas Neu | F | R | 2005-06-14 | 5' 7" | 178 | (United States) Hartland, WI, USA |
| 15 | Charles Panchisin | F | R | 2004-11-15 | 5' 10" | 157 | (United States) Lincolnshire, IL, USA |
| 2 | Billy Sheridan | F | R | 2005-03-26 | 5' 7" | 161 | (United States) Mullica Hill, NJ, USA |
| 16 | Charlie Spencer | F | L | 2006-07-04 | 5' 6" | 170 | (United States) Wheaton, IL, USA |
| 14 | Jackson Vaites | F | R | 2007-07-10 | 6' 1" | 190 | (United States) Mullica Hill, NJ, USA |
| 18 | Hudson Weber-Stewart | F | R | 2007-11-12 | 5' 10" | 214 | (United States) Friendswood, TX, USA |
| 5 | Drew Belleson | D | R | 2005-04-02 | 6' 1" | 188 | (United States) Dayton, OH, USA |
| 7 | Nicholas Bianchi | D | R | 2006-07-23 | 5' 11" | 178 | (United States) Webster, NY, USA |
| 3 | Kalib Capecci | D | R | 2006-10-20 | 6' 0" | 185 | (United States) Sewell, NJ, USA |
| 19 | Mikey Conlon | D | R | 2007-05-18 | 5' 11" | 179 | (United States) Rockville Centre, NY, USA |
| 11 | Luke Janviriya | D | L | 2006-05-01 | 5' 10.5" | 167 | (United States) Bloomfield, NJ, USA |
| 4 | Zachary Spagnuolo | D | L | 2007-04-08 | 5' 7" | 178 | (United States) Allen, TX, USA |
| 21 | Joe Stauber | D | R | 2005-04-05 | 5' 10" | 200 | (United States) Duluth, MN, USA |
| 17 | Bryce Strand | D | L | 2004-02-10 | 5' 9" | 166 | (United States) Appleton, WI, USA |
| 23 | Ryan Vaites | D | L | 2004-11-04 | 6' 1" | 162 | (United States) Mullica Hill, NJ, USA |
| 30 | Owen Crudale | G | L | 2005-05-26 | 5' 11" | 184 | (United States) San Diego, CA, USA |
| 35 | Beau Lane | G | L | 2004-06-16 | 6' 4" | 163 | (United States) Pembroke, MA, USA |
| 32 | Anthony Sciere | G | L | 2007-06-06 | 6' 2" | 185 | (United States) Pittsburgh, PA, USA |

== Season-by-season records ==
| Season | GP | W | L | OTL | Pts | GF | GA | PIM | Finish | Playoffs |
|---|---|---|---|---|---|---|---|---|---|---|
| 2015–16 | 60 | 35 | 21 | 4 | 74 | 196 | 146 | 1260 | 1st of 4, East; 8th of 22, NAHL | Won Div. Semifinals, 3–0 vs. Wilkes-Barre/Scranton Knights; Won Div. Finals, 3–0 vs. Johnstown Tomahawks; Lost Robertson Cup Semifinals, 0–2 vs. Fairbanks Ice Dogs |
| 2016–17 | 60 | 46 | 11 | 3 | 95 | 214 | 106 | 1003 | 1st of 5, East; 1st of 24, NAHL | Won Div. Semifinals, 3–0 vs. Wilkes-Barre/Scranton Knights; Won Div. Finals, 3–2 vs. New Jersey Titans; Won Robertson Cup Semifinals, 2–1 vs. Aberdeen Wings; Lost Robertson Cup Championship game, 0–3 vs. Lone Star Brahmas |
| 2017–18 | 60 | 41 | 15 | 4 | 86 | 206 | 134 | 922 | 1st of 5, East Div. 3rd of 23, NAHL | Won Div. Semifinals, 3–2 vs. Northeast Generals; Lost Div. Finals, 0–3 vs. Wilkes-Barre/Scranton Knights |
| 2018–19 | 60 | 35 | 17 | 8 | 78 | 176 | 131 | 886 | 2nd of 6, East Div. 5th of 24, NAHL | Lost Div. Semifinals, 2–3 vs. New Jersey Titans |
| 2019–20 | 54 | 21 | 30 | 3 | 45 | 127 | 163 | 939 | 5th of 7, East Div. 19th of 26, NAHL | Season cancelled |
| 2020–21 | Did not participate due to the COVID-19 pandemic | | | | | | | | | |
| 2021–22 | 60 | 35 | 22 | 3 | 73 | 181 | 164 | 926 | 3rd of 7, East Div. 10th of 29, NAHL | Won Div. Semifinals, 3–2 vs. Johnstown Tomahawks; Lost Div. Finals, 1–3 vs. New Jersey Titans |
| 2022–23 | 60 | 27 | 30 | 3 | 57 | 166 | 181 | 941 | 6th of 7, East Div. 24th of 29, NAHL | Did not qualify |
| 2023–24 | 60 | 26 | 30 | 4 | 56 | 175 | 204 | 874 | 7th of 9 East Div. 23rd of 32 NAHL | Did not qualify |
| 2024–25 | 59 | 26 | 30 | 3 | 55 | 177 | 190 | 925 | 7th of 10 East; 25th of 35 NAHL | Did not qualify |
| 2025–26 | 59 | 21 | 29 | 9 | 51 | 155 | 186 | 1069 | 10 of 10 East; 30th of 34 NAHL | Did not qualify |
