= Amarillo Bulls =

- City: Amarillo, Texas
- League: North American Hockey League
- Founded: 2008
- Home arena: Amarillo Civic Center
- Colors: Scarlet red, navy blue, and gold
- Owners: F&S Management Company LLC (Alberto Fernandez, majority owner)
- Head coach: Rocky Russo

Franchise history
- 2008–2010: Albert Lea Thunder
- 2010–2021: Amarillo Bulls
- 2021–present: North Iowa Bulls

Championships
- Robertson Cups: 1 (2013)

The Amarillo Bulls were a Tier II junior ice hockey team based in Amarillo, Texas. They were a member of the North American Hockey League's South Division and played home games in the Amarillo Civic Center.

== History ==
The franchise joined the NAHL as the Albert Lea Thunder, located in Albert Lea, Minnesota, in 2008. During the second season, issues with ownership forced the league to step in to keep the team playing. On May 11, 2010, it was reported that the team had found new owners and would relocate to Texas for the 2010–11 season. Their franchise and roster were officially sold to the Amarillo ownership on May 26, 2010. On June 18, the team announced the new name, logo and colors of the team after a name-the-team contest.

The Amarillo Bulls announced their inaugural coach as Denis Williams, former NCAA Division I coach at Bowling Green. On May 13, 2013, the Bulls captured their first Robertson Cup Championship defeating the Wenatchee Wild 5–0 in the championship game. Following the 2013–14 season, coach Williams was named as the head coach of the expansion Bloomington Thunder of the United States Hockey League, a Tier I team and a recent addition to the Consolidated Sports Holdings portfolio.

In 2019, the team was sold to F&S Management Company LLC led by majority owner Alberto Fernandez. On March 5, 2021, it was announced that the team would relocate to Mason City, Iowa, starting in the 2021–22 season as the North Iowa Bulls, an organization that had been operating in the North American 3 Hockey League and also owned by Fernandez.

The Bulls were replaced in Amarillo by the Amarillo Wranglers in the 2021–22 season.

== Season-by-season records ==
Season	GP	W	L	OTL	Pts	GF	GA	PIM	Finish	Playoffs
2010–11	58	36	16	6	78	209	171	1,637	2nd of 6, South	Lost Robertson Cup Semifinal
2011–12	60	46	7	7	99	263	136	1,550	1st of 7, South	Lost Robertson Cup Semifinal
2012–13	60	46	7	7	99	248	118	1,268	1st of 6, South	Robertson Cup Champions
2013–14	60	40	15	6	86	207	120	1,395	1st of 7, South	Lost in Division Finals
2014–15	60	25	31	4	54	174	222	1,493	7th of 8, South	Did not qualify
2015–16	60	13	43	4	30	133	218	1,211	6th of 6, South	Did not qualify
2016–17	60	22	28	10	54	173	206	917	6th of 7, South	Did not qualify
2017–18	60	23	26	11	57	166	193	1,333	5th of 6, South	Did not qualify
2018–19	60	46	8	6	98	263	136	1,332	1st of 6, South	Lost Robertson Cup Semifinals
2019–20	54	39	10	5	83	185	101	597	2nd of 7, South	Season cancelled
2020–21	56	29	18	9	67	159	166	1,003	4th of 6, South; 7th of 23, NAHL	Lost Division Semifinals

=== Playoffs ===
- 2011

Division Semifinals – Amarillo Bulls defeated Texas Tornado, 3-games-to-1
Division Finals – Amarillo Bulls defeated Topeka RoadRunners, 3-games-to-2
Robertson Cup Round Robin – Amarillo Bulls (2–1) - Qualify for Semifinal Game (W, 5–2 vs. Warriors; W, 5-3 vs. RoadRunners; L, 1–2 vs. Ice Dogs)
Robertson Cup Semifinal Game – Michigan Warriors defeated Amarillo Bulls, 6–2

- 2012

Division Semifinals – Amarillo Bulls defeated Odessa Jackalopes, 3-games-to-1
Division Finals – Amarillo Bulls defeated Topeka RoadRunners, 3-games-to-1
Robertson Cup Round Robin – Amarillo Bulls (1–2) - Qualify for Semifinal (OTW, 3–2 vs. Tornado; L, 1-3 vs. Ice Dogs; L, 2-6 vs. Bobcats)
Robertson Cup Semifinal Game – St. Louis Bandits defeated Amarillo Bulls, 3–2

- 2013

Division Semifinals – Amarillo Bulls defeated Corpus Christi IceRays, 3-games-to-1
Division Finals – Amarillo Bulls defeated Texas Tornado, 3-games-to-0
Robertson Cup Round Robin – Amarillo Bulls (2–1) - Qualify for Championship Game (OTW, 2–1 vs. Ironmmen; OTW, 2–1 vs. Bobcats; L, 0-7 vs. Wild)
Robertson Cup Final – Amarillo Bulls defeated Wenatchee Wild, 5-0
Robertson Cup Champions

- 2014

Division Semifinals – Amarillo Bulls defeated Wichita Falls Wildcats, 3-games-to-0
Division Finals – Topeka RoadRunners defeated Amarillo Bulls, 3-games-to-2

- 2019

Division Semifinals – Amarillo Bulls defeated Corpus Christi IceRays, 3-games-to-2
Division Finals – Amarillo Bulls defeated Shreveport Mudbugs, 3-games-to-2
Robertson Cup Semifinals – Aberdeen Wings' defeated Amarillo Bulls, 2-games-to-1

- 2021

Division Semifinals – Shreveport Mudbugs defeated Amarillo Bulls, 3-games-to-1
