= Wenatchee Wild (junior A) =

- City: Wenatchee, Washington
- League: British Columbia Hockey League
- Division: U.S.
- Founded: 2010 (BCHL franchise); 2008 (First NAHL franchise)
- Home arena: Town Toyota Center
- Colors: Blue, black, and white
- Owner: David White
- General manager: Bliss Littler
- Head coach: Chris Clark
- Media: NewsRadio 560 KPQ

Franchise history
- First NAHL franchise
- 2008–2013: Wenatchee Wild
- 2013–2015: Rio Grande Valley Killer Bees
- 2015–2017: Aston Rebels
- 2017–2018: Philadelphia Rebels
- 2018–2022: Jamestown Rebels
- 2022–present: Philadelphia Rebels
- BCHL franchise
- 2010–2013: Fresno Monsters
- 2013–2023: Wenatchee Wild

The Wenatchee Wild were a Junior A ice hockey team. The team played its home games at the 4,300-seat Town Toyota Center in Wenatchee, Washington. The team joined the North American Hockey League as an expansion club for the 2008–09 season, and in that time they were well known for their rivalry with the Fairbanks Ice Dogs. The Wild moved to the British Columbia Hockey League for 2015–16, after seeking approval from both Hockey Canada and USA Hockey for three years. In 2023, the ownership of the Wild purchased and relocated the Winnipeg Ice, a major junior Western Hockey League franchise, under the Wenatchee Wild brand, but ceased operations of their junior A team.

== History ==
=== NAHL years (2008–2015) ===
Wild logo, 2008-2018

On September 12, 2006, ground was broken on a new multipurpose event center that would be home to a new ice hockey team. On February 22, 2008, the North American Hockey League granted Wenatchee Junior Hockey, LLC. with conditional approval for an expansion team. On May 20, 2008, Wenatchee Junior Hockey, LLC. announced the franchise would be the "Wild." The name was chosen by a "name-the-team contest" held at local schools in Wenatchee and East Wenatchee. Other potential names for the team were the Wranglers, Bombers, Wonders, Hockeyes, Winning Walruses and Ice Busters. The Wild played their first game on September 17, 2008, losing to the Motor City Metal Jackets 2–1 in overtime. The Wild made a championship run in that first season, winning the division title but losing the championship game 3–2 in overtime. The following season, they came back and won the West Division championship in 2009–10, but were eliminated in the round-robin championship tournament.

On May 13, 2013, the Wild lost their first and only game during the 2013 Robertson Cup Championship Tournament to the Amarillo Bulls 5-0 during the Robertson Cup championship game. On January 19, 2013, USA Hockey approved the transfer of the Wenatchee Wild from the NAHL to the British Columbia Hockey League for the 2013–14 season. However, on May 14, 2013, the Wild announced they would instead relocate the franchise to Hidalgo, Texas and play as the Rio Grande Valley Killer Bees of the NAHL.

On May 22, 2013, the Wenatchee City Council approves a deal to move the Fresno Monsters to Wenatchee and keep their name and logo. The team announced that it had retained coach Bliss Littler from the previous franchise on June 4, 2013.

=== British Columbia Hockey League (2015–2023) ===
On June 1, 2015, the Wenatchee Wild announced that they would be joining the British Columbia Hockey League (BCHL) for the 2015–16 season. In their third season in the BCHL, the Wild won the 2018 Fred Page Cup as the playoff champions and was the first American team to win the cup since 1979. In 2023, the BCHL left Hockey Canada sanctioning.

On June 16, 2023, the Western Hockey League announced that the Wild owners David and Lisa White had purchased the franchise playing as the Winnipeg Ice and the league approved relocation to Wenatchee starting in the 2023–24 WHL season. The Wenatchee Wild name and branding carried forward to the WHL team, while the junior A team ceased operations.

== Season records ==
Season	GP	W	L	OTL	T	PTS	GF	GA	PIM	Finish	Playoffs
North American Hockey League
2008–09	58	35	19	4	—	74	197	182	1,322	2nd of 4, West; 9th of 19, NAHL	Won Div. Semifinal series, 3–1 (Alaska Avalanche); Won Div. Final series, 3–1 (Fairbanks Ice Dogs); Won Round-Robin, 3–2 (Bismarck Bobcats), 5–4 (OT) (Mahoning Valley Phantoms), 0–6 (St. Louis Bandits), 4–3 (North Iowa Outlaws); Lost Robertson Cup Championship, 2–3 (OT) (St. Louis Bandits)
2009–10	58	45	10	3	—	93	219	125	1,520	1st of 4, West t-1st of 19, NAHL	Won Div. Semifinal series, 3–0 (Kenai River Brown Bears); Won Div. Final series, 3–0 (Fairbanks Ice Dogs); Lost Round-Robin, 2–1 (Bismarck Bobcats), 4–5 (Traverse City North Stars), 5–4 (OT) (St. Louis Bandits), 2–3 (Fairbanks Ice Dogs)
2010–11	58	34	21	3	—	71	207	148	1,208	2nd of 4, West t-11th of 26, NAHL	Won Div. Semifinal series, 3–0 (Alaska Avalanche); Lost Div. Final series, 1–3 (Fairbanks Ice Dogs)
2011–12	60	36	17	7	—	79	165	102	1,297	2nd of 6, West t-8th of 28, NAHL	Won Div. Semifinal series, 3–2 (Alaska Avalanche); Lost Div. Final series, 0–3 (Fairbanks Ice Dogs)
2012–13	60	39	15	6	—	84	197	147	1,509	1st of 4, West; 5th of 24, NAHL	Won Div. Semifinal series, 3–2 (Fresno Monsters); Won Div. Final series, 3–2 (Fairbanks Ice Dogs); Won Round-Robin, 2–3 (Bismarck Bobcats), 5–2 (Jamestown Ironmen), 7–0 (Amarillo Bulls); Lost Robertson Cup Championship, 0–5 (Amarillo Bulls)
2013–14	60	29	23	8	—	66	169	163	867	3rd of 6, Midwest t-12th of 24, NAHL	Won Div. Semifinal series, 3–2 (Minnesota Wilderness); Lost Div. Final series, 2–3 (Fairbanks Ice Dogs)
2014–15	60	27	25	8	—	62	177	171	808	5th of 8, South; 14th of 24, NAHL	Won Div. Play-in series, 2–0 (Corpus Christi IceRays); Lost Div. Semifinal series, 0–3 vs. Lone Star Brahmas
British Columbia Hockey League
2015–16	58	34	16	4	4	76	206	147	588	2nd of 6, Mainland; 5th of 17, BCHL	Won Div. Semifinals, 4–1 vs. Langley Rivermen; Lost Div. Finals, 1–4 vs. Chilliwack Chiefs
2016–17	58	45	9	4	0	94	294	135	714	1st of 6, Mainland; 1st of 17, BCHL	Won Div. Semifinals, 4–2 vs. Prince George Spruce Kings; Lost Div. Finals, 0–4 vs. Chilliwack Chiefs
2017–18	58	37	16	4	1	79	241	158	714	3rd of 7, Interior; 3rd of 17, BCHL	Won Div. Quarterfinals, 4–0 vs. Merritt Centennials; Won Div. Semifinals, 4–2 vs. Vernon Vipers; Won Div. Finals, 4–1 vs. Trail Smoke Eaters; Won League Finals, 4–1 vs. Prince George Spruce Kings; Won Doyle Cup, 4–1 vs. Spruce Grove Saints
2018–19	58	32	20	6	—	70	202	170	549	3rd of 7, Interior; 7th of 17, BCHL	Won First Round, 4–3 vs. West Kelowna Warriors; Won Second Round, 4–2 vs. Cowichan Valley Capitals; Lost Semifinals, 1–4 vs. Vernon Vipers
2019–20	58	30	23	5	0	65	184	183	560	4th of 7, Interior; 7th of 17, BCHL	Lost First Round, 1–4 vs. Vernon Vipers
2020–21	Withdrew from participation due to the COVID-19 pandemic										
2021–22	54	22	26	5	1	50	153	174	459	7th of 9, Interior; 13th of 18, BCHL	Lost First Round, 3–4 vs. Salmon Arm Silverbacks
2022–23	54	28	23	3	0	59	198	186	485	7th of 9, Interior; 13th of 18, BCHL	Won First Round, 4–2 vs. Cranbrook Bucks; Lost Conf. Semifinals, 0–4 vs. Penticton Vees

== Robertson Cup ==
The Wenatchee Wild hosted the 2010 NAHL Pepsi Robertson Cup.

== National Junior A Championship ==
The National Junior A Championship, formerly known as the Royal Bank Cup from 1996 to 2018, is the annual championship tournament for Hockey Canada's junior A hockey leagues. Depending on the year, various regional champions, qualifiers, and hosts participate in the championship tournament. The tournament usually consists of opening in a round-robin with the top four teams then advancing to a semifinal were the winners compete a championship game.

Year	Round-robin	Record W–OTW–OTL–L	Standing	Semifinal	Championship game
2018	OTW, Chilliwack Chiefs (Host) 2–1; W, Steinbach Pistons (Western) 4–3; OTW, Ottawa Jr. Senators (Eastern) 3–2; W, Wellington Dukes (Central) 7–1	2–2–0–0	1st of 5	L, Wellington Dukes 1–2	—

== Head coaches ==
On November 24, 2010, the Wenatchee Wild fired Paul Baxter, their inaugural head coach. It is unspecified exactly what led to the firing of Baxter, who led the Wenatchee Wild to back-to-back West Division titles in 2008 and 2009 and made it to the Robertson Cup Finals in the Wild's first year. Baxter was replaced in December 2010 by John Becanic. On April 27, 2012, shortly after elimination from the 2012 West Division Playoffs, Coach Becanic resigned. USHL coach Bliss Littler was announced as the new head coach and director of hockey operations on May 23, 2012. Littler currently holds the record as the winningest coach in USA Hockey history (Jr. Tier I and II). Littler had been released from his duties as the USHL's Omaha Lancers head coach mid season 2011–12. Littler stepped down from coaching during the 2019–20 BCHL season citing health reasons, but stayed on as general manager. Chris Clark was named the interim head coach, but the interim tag was later removed before the eventually cancelled 2020–21 season. Littler was given a ten-year extension as general manager in 2021.
