= Odessa Jackalopes =

- City: Odessa, Texas
- League: North American Hockey League
- Division: South
- Founded: 2008
- Home arena: Ector County Coliseum
- Colors: Black, red, purple
- General manager: Scott Deur
- Head coach: Scott Deur
- Affiliates: Atlanta Capitals and Texas RoadRunners (NA3HL); Colorado Springs Tigers (NAPHL)

Franchise history
- 2008–2011: Owatonna Express
- 2011–present: Odessa Jackalopes

The Odessa Jackalopes are a Tier II junior ice hockey team playing in the North American Hockey League (NAHL). The team is based in Odessa, Texas and plays their home games at Ector County Coliseum.

== History ==
The franchise first played as the Owatonna Express in Owatonna, Minnesota, in 2008 replacing the recently relocated Southern Minnesota Express. The Express played their home games at the Four Seasons Centre at the Steele County Fairgrounds. The Express played in the Central Division for three seasons from 2008 to 2011 until the team was sold to the Odessa Jackalopes in 2011.

A previous minor professional hockey franchise known as the Odessa Jackalopes played in the Western Professional Hockey League and Central Hockey League from 1997 to 2011.

== Season-by-season records ==
| Season | GP | W | L | OTL | Pts | GF | GA | PIM | Finish | Playoffs |
|---|---|---|---|---|---|---|---|---|---|---|
Owatonna Express
| 2008–09 | 58 | 29 | 24 | 5 | 63 | 214 | 189 | 812 | 3rd of 5, Central; 10th of 19, NAHL | Won Div. Semifinal series, 3–1 (North Iowa Outlaws); Lost Div. Final series, 2–3 (Bismarck Bobcats) |
| 2009–10 | 58 | 32 | 22 | 4 | 68 | 188 | 190 | 843 | 2nd of 5, Central t-9th of 19, NAHL | Lost Div. Semifinal series, 1–3 (Alexandria Blizzard) |
| 2010–11 | 58 | 32 | 19 | 7 | 71 | 175 | 179 | 985 | t-2nd of 6, Central t-10th of 26, NAHL | Lost Div. Semifinal series, 1–3 (Coulee Region Chill) |
Odessa Jackalopes
| 2011–12 | 60 | 27 | 28 | 5 | 59 | 153 | 176 | 1,036 | 4th of 7, South; 19th of 28, NAHL | Lost Div. Semifinal series, 1–3 (Amarillo Bulls) |
| 2012–13 | 60 | 6 | 51 | 3 | 15 | 121 | 309 | 1315 | 6th of 6, South; 24th of 24, NAHL | Did not qualify |
| 2013–14 | 60 | 15 | 40 | 5 | 35 | 123 | 217 | 1149 | 7th of 7, South; 24th of 24, NAHL | Did not qualify |
| 2014–15 | 60 | 15 | 38 | 7 | 37 | 172 | 261 | 1492 | 8th of 8, South; 23rd of 24, NAHL | Did not qualify |
| 2015–16 | 60 | 27 | 29 | 4 | 58 | 185 | 218 | 1315 | 4th of 6, South; 15th of 22, NAHL | Lost Div. Semifinal series, 0–3 (Wichita Falls Wildcats) |
| 2016–17 | 60 | 26 | 25 | 9 | 61 | 183 | 200 | 1683 | 5th of 7, South; 17th of 24, NAHL | Did not qualify |
| 2017–18 | 60 | 33 | 22 | 5 | 71 | 192 | 163 | 1211 | 3rd of 6, South; 10th of 23, NAHL | Lost Div. Semifinal series, 0–3 (Lone Star Brahmas) |
| 2018–19 | 60 | 21 | 35 | 4 | 46 | 165 | 222 | 1386 | 6th of 6, South; 21st of 24, NAHL | Did not qualify |
| 2019–20 | 50 | 9 | 39 | 2 | 20 | 73 | 203 | 1014 | 7th of 7, South; 23rd of 23, NAHL | Postseason cancelled |
| 2020–21 | 56 | 12 | 36 | 8 | 32 | 117 | 190 | 1021 | 6th of 6, South; 23rd of 23, NAHL | Did not qualify |
| 2021–22 | 60 | 29 | 26 | 5 | 63 | 193 | 193 | 1071 | 5th of 8, South; 18th of 29, NAHL | Did not qualify |
| 2022–23 | 60 | 30 | 27 | 3 | 63 | 174 | 199 | 993 | 6th of 8, South; 20th of 29, NAHL | Did not qualify |
| 2023–24 | 60 | 23 | 29 | 8 | 54 | 162 | 187 | 874 | 7th of 9, South; 24th of 32, NAHL | Did not qualify |
| 2024–25 | 59 | 26 | 29 | 4 | 56 | 209 | 208 | 1137 | 7th of 9, South; 24th of 35, NAHL | Did not qualify |
