= Minnesota Magicians =

- City: Richfield, Minnesota
- League: North American Hockey League
- Division: Midwest
- Founded: 2010
- Home arena: Richfield Ice Arena
- Colors: Black, red, and white

Franchise history
- 2010–2012: New Mexico Mustangs
- 2013–2022: Minnesota Magicians
- 2022–present: Wisconsin Windigo

The Minnesota Magicians were a Tier II junior ice hockey team in the North American Hockey League. Based in Eagle River, Wisconsin, the Windigo play their home games at Eagle River Stadium, affectionately referred to as the "Dome".

== History ==
The franchise was previously known as the New Mexico Mustangs, a team which began in 2010 and played at the Santa Ana Star Center in Rio Rancho, New Mexico. After two seasons, both seeing them finishing in last place in the South Division, the Mustangs announced on May 23, 2012, that they had been granted inactive status and would not compete in the upcoming season.

On December 21, it was announced that the Mustangs' franchise had been acquired by the Minnesota Junior Hockey Group and would relocate to Richfield for the 2013–14 season. The Magicians' name, logo and colors were announced on January 21, 2013.

In March 2014, the team completed its inaugural season of play with 50 points, averaging nearly 700 fans per game. For the 2016–17 season, the league moved the Magicians back to the Midwest Division after one year in the Central.

The Magicians captured their first division championship in 2021 to earn a spot in the Robertson Cup semifinals. The team began their playoff run with a sweep of second place Fairbanks followed by a five-game series victory over Kenai River.

The team announced in March 2022 that it had been sold to Copper Island Hockey Club, LLC and would relocate to Eagle River, Wisconsin for the 2022–23 season. On May 3, the team was announced as the Wisconsin Windigo.

== Season-by-season records ==
Season	GP	W	L	OTL	PTS	GF	GA	PIM	Finish	Playoffs
2013–14	60	21	31	8	50	143	193	1045	6th of 6, Midwest t-20th of 24, NAHL	Did not qualify
2014–15	60	21	35	4	46	160	221	1062	4th of 5, Midwest t-18th of 24, NAHL	Lost first round, 0–3 vs Fairbanks Ice Dogs
2015–16	60	24	28	8	56	164	198	936	5th of 6, Central t-16th of 22, NAHL	Did not qualify
2016–17	60	31	22	7	69	180	169	691	t–2nd of 6, Midwest t-10th of 24, NAHL	Lost division semifinals, 0–3 vs Fairbanks Ice Dogs
2017–18	60	28	24	8	64	164	183	789	4th of 6, Midwest t-13th of 23, NAHL	Lost division semifinals, 0–3 vs Fairbanks Ice Dogs
2018–19	60	36	21	3	75	175	154	1347	2nd of 6, Midwest t-6th of 24, NAHL	Won division semifinals, 3–1 vs Springfield Jr. Blues; Lost division finals, 0–3 vs Fairbanks Ice Dogs
2019–20	53	21	23	9	51	143	173	554	4th of 6, Midwest; 16th of 23, NAHL	Postseason cancelled due to COVID-19
2020–21	48	24	21	3	51	144	153	589	3rd of 5, Midwest; 16th of 23, NAHL	Won division semifinals, 3–0 vs Fairbanks Ice Dogs; Won division finals, 3–2 vs Kenai River Brown Bears; Lost Robertson Cup semifinal, 0–2 vs Aberdeen Wings
2021–22	60	25	26	9	59	197	231	1002	6th of 8, Midwest t-20th of 29, NAHL	Did not qualify
