= Kenai River Brown Bears =

- City: Soldotna, Alaska
- League: North American Hockey League
- Division: Midwest
- Founded: 2007
- Home arena: Soldotna Sports Center
- Colors: Brown
- Owner: Kenai Peninsula Youth Foundation
- General manager: Nate Kiel
- Head coach: Taylor Shaw

Franchise history
- 2007–present: Kenai River Brown Bears

The Kenai River Brown Bears are a Tier II junior ice hockey team in the North American Hockey League based in Soldotna, Alaska. The team joined the North American Hockey League (NAHL) as an expansion team for the 2007–08 season, and since then has upgraded and added team-specific facilities to the 2,000 plus capacity Soldotna Sports Center it calls home.

On February 28, 2017, during a major slump in the Alaskan economy, years of team futility and increased travel costs, the Brown Bears announced that they would cease operations at the end of the 2016–17 season. However, after a fan fundraising effort, the Brown Bears applied to the NAHL for approval to reactivate in April 2017 and was approved.

Due to the travel restrictions caused by the COVID-19 pandemic, the Brown Bears temporarily relocated home games to Breezy Point, Minnesota, for most of the 2020–21 season until mid-April 2021.

The 20-21 season marked the first season the Brown Bears won a playoff series, winning the divisional semifinals over the Janesville Jets.

== Season-by-season records ==
Season	GP	W	L	OTL	PTS	GF	GA	PIM	Finish	Playoffs
2007–08	58	12	38	8	32	144	257	1272	6th of 6, South; 18th of 18, NAHL	Did not qualify
2008–09	58	14	36	8	36	165	249	1350	4th of 4, West; 17th of 19, NAHL	Lost Div. Semifinal series, 0–3 (Fairbanks Ice Dogs)
2009–10	58	12	40	6	30	144	247	1045	4th of 4, West; 19th of 19, NAHL	Lost Div. Semifinal series, 0–3 (Wenatchee Wild)
2010–11	58	27	24	7	61	189	191	1076	4th of 6, West; 17th of 26, NAHL	Lost Div. Semifinal series, 0–3 (Fairbanks Ice Dogs)
2011–12	60	31	25	4	66	186	189	894	4th of 6, West; 15th of 28, NAHL	Lost Div. Semifinal series, 0–3 (Fairbanks Ice Dogs)
2012–13	60	29	25	6	64	139	224	1115	3rd of 4, West; 14th of 24, NAHL	Lost Div. Semifinal series, 2–3 (Fairbanks Ice Dogs)
2013–14	60	28	24	8	64	164	178	1181	4th of 6, Midwest; 14th of 24, NAHL	Lost Div. Semifinal series, 2–3 (Fairbanks Ice Dogs)
2014–15	60	16	42	2	34	132	244	963	5th of 5, Midwest; 24th of 24, NAHL	Did not qualify
2015–16	60	4	51	5	13	109	232	1351	6th of 6, Midwest; 22nd of 22, NAHL	Did not qualify
2016–17	60	12	46	2	26	121	233	1255	6th of 6, Midwest; 23rd of 24, NAHL	Did not qualify
2017–18	60	18	38	4	40	153	238	1269	6th of 6, Midwest; 22nd of 23, NAHL	Did not qualify
2018–19	60	23	31	6	52	139	174	1088	5th of 6, Midwest; 20th of 24, NAHL	Did not qualify
2019–20	52	27	19	6	60	197	182	853	3rd of 6, Midwest; 13th of 26, NAHL	Postseason cancelled
2020–21	48	22	24	2	46	155	168	787	4th of 5, Midwest; 20th of 23, NAHL	Won Div. Semifinal series, 3–1 (Janesville Jets); Lost Div. Final series, 2–3 (Minnesota Magicians)
2021–22	60	14	41	5	33	147	256	1127	8th of 8, Midwest; 28th of 29, NAHL	Did not qualify
2022–23	60	32	24	4	68	170	185	1095	3rd of 8, Midwest; 12th of 29, NAHL	Lost Div. Semifinal series, 0–3 (Minnesota Wilderness)
2023–24	60	20	34	6	46	171	232	931	8th of 8th Midwest; 27 of 32 NAHL	Did not qualify
2024–25	59	21	30	8	50	159	216	988	7th of 8th Midwest; 27 of 35 NAHL	Did not qualify

== Head coaches ==
- 2007–2009: Mike Flanagan
- 2011–2013: Oliver David
- 2013–2016: Geoff Beauparlant
- 2016–2017: Jeff Worlton
- 2017–2019: Josh Petrich
- 2019: Dan Bogdan (interim)
- 2019–2021: Kevin Murdock
- 2021: Josh Dubinsky
- 2021–present: Taylor Shaw (interim)
- 2022–present: Taylor Shaw – https://www.kenairiverbrownbears.com/shaw-named-new-head-coach-as-brown-bears-announce-staff—″″
