= 2022–23 BCHL season =

- League: BCHL
- Sport: Hockey
- Duration: Regular season 23 September 2022 – 26 March 2023; Playoffs; 31 March 2023 - 17 May 2023
- Teams: 18

Fred Page Cup
- Champions: Penticton Vees

BCHL seasons
- ← 2021–22 2023–24 →

The 2022–23 BCHL season was the 61st season of the British Columbia Hockey League (BCHL). The eighteen teams from the Coastal and Interior Conferences played 54 game schedules. The 2022 BCHL showcase took place in Chilliwack From October 17 to October 20, 2022.

Many other special events took place during the season, such as the All-Star and Top Prospect games to be held in Penticton in January, as well as the BCHL Road Show taking place in Burns Lake on February 18 and 19, 2023.

== League changes ==
Map of BCHL, 2021–22 to 2022–23
Coastal Division
Interior Division

The league introduced a set of targets to be met over the following four years, including the capacity for video replay, and the elimination of player fees.

During the offseason, the league renamed several of its year-end awards. The Goaltending Award, awarded to the top goaltender every year, was named the Michael Garteig trophy, named after former Powell River Kings and Penticton Vees goaltender Michael Garteig. The Defensive Award, given to the top defenceman, was renamed the Blair Campbell award, named after former BCHL defenceman Blair Campbell. Finally, the award for Broadcaster of the Year was renamed the Jim Hughson Award, named after former Vancouver Canucks and Hockey Night In Canada Play by Play broadcaster Jim Hughson, who got his start in the BCHL. The league also created two new awards: the Jeff Tambellini Trophy, to be awarded to the playoff MVP, and the Kyle Turris community award, awarded to a player on each team that best represents their team in their communities.

== Standings ==
Note: GP = Games Played, W = Wins, L = Losses, T/O/S = Ties/Overtime Losses/Shootout Losses, Pts = Points

Coastal Conference
TEAM NAMES	GP	W	L	T/O/S	Pts
Nanaimo Clippers	54	37	14	3	77
Surrey Eagles	54	35	16	3	73
Alberni Valley Bulldogs	54	31	19	4	66
Coquitlam Express	54	28	19	7	63
Chilliwack Chiefs	54	28	22	4	60
Victoria Grizzlies	54	26	20	8	60
Powell River Kings	54	20	26	8	48
Langley Rivermen	54	16	33	5	37
Cowichan Valley Capitals	54	10	38	6	26

Interior Conference
TEAM NAMES	GP	W	L	T/O/S	Pts
Penticton Vees	54	50	3	1	101
Cranbrook Bucks	54	36	14	4	76
West Kelowna Warriors	54	28	20	6	62
Salmon Arm Silverbacks	54	27	20	7	61
Prince George Spruce Kings	54	27	20	7	61
Vernon Vipers	54	27	21	6	60
Wenatchee Wild	54	28	23	3	59
Trail Smoke Eaters	54	20	27	7	47
Merritt Centennials	54	12	37	5	29

== Post-season ==
=== 2023 BCHL Fred Page Cup playoffs ===
Playoff results

First round
Alberni Valley	4
Victoria	0
Surrey	4
Powell River	1
Chilliwack	4
Coquitlam	1
Nanaimo	4
Langley	2
Penticton	4
Trail	0
Cranbrook	2
Wenatchee	4
West Kelowna	2
Vernon	4
Salmon Arm	4
Prince George	0

Second round
Alberni Valley	4
Surrey	3
Chilliwack	4
Nanaimo	2
Penticton	4
Wenatchee	0
Vernon	1
Salmon Arm	4

Semi-finals
Alberni Valley	4
Chilliwack	0
Penticton	4
Salmon Arm	1

Fred Page Cup Final
Penticton	4
Alberni Valley	0

== Scoring leaders ==
GP = Games Played, G = Goals, A = Assists, P = Points, PIM = Penalties In Minutes

Player	Team	GP	G	A	Pts	PIM
Bradly Nadeau	Penticton Vees	54	45	68	113	20
Josh Nadeau	Penticton Vees	54	44	66	110	14
Aydar Suniev	Penticton Vees	50	45	45	90	44
Ean Somoza	Wenatchee Wild	54	22	52	74	58
Kai Daniells	Nanaimo Clippers	54	35	36	71	44
Cade Littler	Wenatchee Wild	51	29	39	68	28
Brady Hunter	Trail Smoke Eaters	54	18	44	62	14
Brody Waters	Nanaimo Clippers	51	22	39	61	57
Oliver Picard	Victoria Grizzlies	53	29	29	58	50
Ethan Mistry	Nanaimo Clippers	54	11	47	58	12

== Leading goaltenders ==
Note: GP = Games Played, Mins = Minutes Played, W = Wins, L = Losses, OTL = Overtime Losses, GA = Goals Against, SO = Shutouts, Sv% = Save Percentage, GAA = Goals Against Average.

Player	Team	GP	Mins	W	L	OTL	GA	SO	Sv%	GAA
Luca Di Pasquo	Penticton Vees	40	2367	36	3	0	67	4	.922	1.70
Eli Pulver	Surrey Eagles	35	2067	23	8	2	79	6	.930	2.29
Nathan Airey	Cranbrook Bucks	36	2164	23	9	1	88	2	.925	2.44
Oliver Auyeung-Ashton	Victoria Grizzlies	44	2495	21	14	5	103	5	.927	2.48
Matthew Tovell	Salmon Arm Silverbacks	47	2726	23	18	3	120	4	.919	2.64

== Award winners ==
- Brett Hull Trophy (Top Scorer): Bradly Nadeau (Penticton Vees)
- Campbell Blair Trophy (Top Defencemen): Abram Wiebe (Chilliwack Chiefs)
- Bruce Allison Memorial Trophy (Rookie of the Year): Oliver Auyeung-Ashton (Victoria Grizzlies)
- Bob Fenton Trophy (Most Sportsmanlike): Josh Nadeau (Penticton Vees)
- Michael Garteig Trophy (Top Goaltender): Nathan Airey (Cranbrook Bucks)
- Wally Forslund Memorial Trophy (Best Goaltending Duo): Luca Di Pasquo & Hank Levy (Penticton Vees)
- Vern Dye Memorial Trophy (regular-season MVP): Bradly Nadeau (Penticton Vees)
- Jeff Tambellini Trophy (Playoff MVP): Bradly Nadeau (Penticton Vees)
- Joe Tennant Memorial Trophy (Coach of the Year): Ryan Donald (Cranbrook Bucks)
- Ron Boileau Memorial Trophy (Best Regular Season Record): Penticton Vees
- Cliff McNabb Memorial Trophy (Coastal Conference champions): Alberni Valley Bulldogs
- Ryan Hatfield Trophy (Interior Conference champions): Penticton Vees
- Fred Page Cup (League Champions): Penticton Vees
- Jim Hughson Award (Broadcaster of the Year): Arch Ecker (Wenatchee Wild)

== 2023 NHL entry draft ==
The following BCHL were selected in the 2023 NHL entry draft.

- Bradly Nadeau (Penticton Vees) - Round 1, Pick 30 - Carolina Hurricanes
- Aydar Suniev (Penticton Vees) - Round 3, Pick 80 - Calgary Flames
- Hoyt Stanley (Victoria Grizzlies) - Round 4, Pick 108 - Ottawa Senators
- Owen Beckner (Salmon Arm Silverbacks) - Round 7, Pick 204 - Ottawa Senators

== See also ==
- 2022 in ice hockey
- 2023 in ice hockey
