= Lone Star Brahmas =

- City: North Richland Hills, Texas
- League: North American Hockey League
- Division: South
- Founded: 1999
- Home arena: NYTEX Sports Centre
- Colors: Black, purple, and white
- Owners: Texas Hockey Partners (Salvatore and Frank Trazzera)
- Head coach: Dan Wildfong

Franchise history
- 1999–2013: Texas Tornado
- 2013–present: Lone Star Brahmas

Championships
- Regular season titles: 3 (2020, 2022, 2024)
- Division titles: 6 (2015, 2017, 2020, 2022, 2024, 2025)
- Robertson Cups: 2 (2017, 2024)

The Lone Star Brahmas are a Tier II junior ice hockey team in the North American Hockey League (NAHL) based in North Richland Hills, Texas (a suburb of Fort Worth). The Brahmas play their home games at the NYTEX Sports Centre.

The Brahmas nickname is a tribute to the Fort Worth Brahmas of the Central Hockey League, which played their final six seasons (most notably winning the 2009 Ray Miron President's Cup championship) at the NYTEX Sports Centre.

The Brahmas most recently won the 2024 Robertson Cup.

== History ==
The franchise was previously known as the Texas Tornado when they started playing in the North American Hockey League (NAHL) for the 1999–2000 season. They originally played at the NYTEX Sports Centre (then called the Blue Line Ice Complex) until 2003 when the Tornado moved to Frisco, Texas, and the Dr Pepper Arena in 2003 (after which the Lone Star Cavalry took their place, playing in the NAHL for one season). The Tornado won five Robertson Cups; in 2001, 2004, 2005, 2006, and 2012. The Tornado won the 2012 Robertson Cup after losing in the Division Semifinals to the Topeka RoadRunners but advanced to the round-robin stage as the host of the 2012 tournament.

However, the on-ice success could not cure the Tornado's off-ice financial woes nor the money they lost the last three years. After seeking out all options to remain in the Dallas-Fort Worth Metroplex, the Tornado sold the team to Texas Hockey Partners, who moved the team back to the NYTEX Sports Centre and gave them their current Brahmas name.

== Longest Playoff game in NAHL history ==
On April 22, 2023, the Lone Star Brahmas hosted the Shreveport Mudbugs in Game 1 of the Robertson Cup Playoffs. The game was tied 1-1 and would take 4 overtimes to finish. The Brahmas won the game in Quadruple OT 2-1 at 1:38 am local time. With a start time at 7:30 CT, the game was approximately 6 Hours and 8 minutes long.

== Season-by-season records ==
Season	GP	W	L	OTL	Pts	GF	GA	PIM	Finish	Playoffs
2013–14	60	23	33	4	50	136	204	1469	5th of 7, South t-20th of 24, NAHL	did not qualify
2014–15	60	40	12	8	88	208	130	1182	1st of 8, South; 3rd of 24, NAHL	Won Div. Semifinal series, 3–0 vs. Wenatchee Wild; Won Div. Final series, 3–1 vs. Topeka RoadRunners; Lost Semifinal series, 1–2 Austin Bruins
2015–16	60	39	12	9	87	186	136	1217	2nd of 6, South; 3rd of 22, NAHL	Lost Div. Semifinal series, 1–3 vs. Topeka RoadRunners
2016–17	60	44	14	2	90	190	135	1171	1st of 7, South; 2nd of 24, NAHL	Won Div. Semifinal series, 3–0 vs. Wichita Falls Wildcats; Won Div. Final series, 3–2 vs. Corpus Christi IceRays; Won Robertson Cup Semifinal series, 2–0 vs. Janesville Jets; Won Robertson Cup Championship, 3–0 vs. Aston Rebels
2017–18	60	38	12	8	86	164	111	929	2nd of 6, South t-3rd of 23, NAHL	Won Div. Semifinal series, 3–0 vs. Odessa Jackalopes; Lost Div. Final series, 2–3 vs. Shreveport Mudbugs
2018–19	60	31	21	8	70	143	150	1095	2nd of 6, South t-10th of 24, NAHL	Lost Div. Semifinal series, 2–3 vs. Shreveport Mudbugs
2019–20	53	42	9	2	86	190	81	1036	1st of 7, South; 1st of 23, NAHL	Postseason cancelled
2020–21	56	38	16	2	78	173	132	1192	2nd of 6, South; 4th of 23, NAHL	Lost Div. Semifinal series, 0–3 vs. Wichita Falls Warriors
2021–22	60	38	12	10	86	197	144	1174	1st of 8, South; 1st of 29, NAHL	Won Div. Semifinal series, 3–1 vs. Shreveport Mudbugs; Lost Div. Final series, 2–3 vs. New Mexico Ice Wolves
2022–23	60	37	15	8	82	155	126	1027	2nd of 8, South; 3rd of 29, NAHL	Lost Div. Semifinal series, 2–3 vs. Shreveport Mudbugs
2023–24	60	44	10	6	94	206	109	935	1st of 8 South; 1st of 32, NAHL	Won Div. Semifinal series, 3–1 vs. New Mexico Ice Wolves; Won Div. Final series, 3–1 vs. Shreveport Mudbugs; Won Robertson Cup Semifinal series, 2–0 vs. Anchorage Wolverines; Won Robertson Cup Championship, 4–2 vs. Maryland Black Bears
2024–25	59	44	11	4	92	195	92	1148	1st of 8, South; 2nd of 35, NAHL	Won Div. Semifinal series, 3–0 New Mexico Ice Wolves; Won Div. Final series, 3–0 Corpus Christi IceRays; Won Robertson Cup Semifinal series, 2–1 vs. Wisconsin Windigo; Lost Robertson Cup Championship, 2–4 vs. Bismarck Bobcats
2025–26	59	42	12	5	89	199	128	1058	1st of 8, South; 4th of 34, NAHL	Won Div. Semifinal series, 3–0 Shreveport Mudbugs; Won Div. Final series, 3–0 El Paso Rhinos; Lost Robertson Cup Semifinal series, 0–2 vs. Maryland Black Bears
