= Rio Grande Valley Killer Bees (NAHL) =

- City: Hidalgo, Texas
- League: NAHL
- Division: South
- Founded: 2008
- Home arena: State Farm Arena
- Colors: Black, teal, gold
- Owners: Hidalgo Sports, LLC
- President: Gilbert Saenz
- Head coach: Joe Coombs
- Captain: Anthony Croston

Franchise history
- 2008–2013: Wenatchee Wild
- 2013–2015: Rio Grande Valley Killer Bees
- 2015–2017: Aston Rebels
- 2017–2018: Philadelphia Rebels
- 2018–2022: Jamestown Rebels
- 2022–present: Philadelphia Rebels

Championships
- Regular season titles: None
- Division titles: None
- Conference titles: None

The Rio Grande Valley Killer Bees were a Tier II Junior A ice hockey team playing in the North American Hockey League. The team was based in the Rio Grande Valley in Hidalgo, Texas, just south of McAllen, and played their home games at State Farm Arena.

== History ==
The original team was a member of the Central Hockey League, a professional minor league, from 2003 to 2012. On June 20, 2012, multiple sources confirmed that the Killer Bees would not play in the 2012–13 season and ceased operations due to increased travel costs after the folding of the other Texas CHL teams in Austin, Corpus Christi and Laredo.

After a season without a team, the Wenatchee Wild of the North American Hockey League (NAHL), a Tier II Junior A hockey league, relocated to Hidalgo, Texas and became the second incarnation of the Rio Grande Valley Killer Bees. Joe Coombs would be hired as the first head coach of the NAHL Killer Bees.

On June 1, 2015, NAHL insiders began reporting the Killer Bees franchise was about to relocate to the Philadelphia suburb of Aston, Pennsylvania and the Killer Bees would subsequently announce that the team was ceasing to operate for the 2015–16 season unless the team president, Gilbert Saenz, could find a local alternative to save the team. However, on June 9, the NAHL announced that the franchise was relocating to become the Aston Rebels.

In 2018, another junior level Killer Bees team was announced as part of the USA Central Hockey League starting in October 2018, but the entire league folded after six weeks of operation.

== Season-by-season records ==
Season	GP	W	L	OTL	Pts	Pct	GF	GA	PIM	Finish	Playoffs
2013–14	60	35	18	7	77	0.642	150	121	1105	3rd of 7, South	Lost Div. Semifinals, 0-3 vs. Topeka RoadRunners
2014–15	60	25	25	10	60	0.500	153	184	1290	6th of 8, South	Lost South Play-In Series, 0-2 vs. Wichita Falls Wildcats
