= Aberdeen Wings =

- City: Aberdeen, South Dakota
- League: North American Hockey League
- Division: Central
- Founded: 2010
- Home arena: Odde Ice Center
- Colors: Red, black, and white
- Owner: Greg Odde
- General manager: Scott Langer
- Head coach: Scott Langer

Franchise history
- 2010–present: Aberdeen Wings

Championships
- Regular season titles: 1 (2021)
- Division titles: 4 (2018, 2019, 2020, 2021)
- Playoff championships: 1 (2019)

The Aberdeen Wings are a Tier II junior ice hockey team based out of Aberdeen, South Dakota, that began play for 2010–11. A member of the North American Hockey League in the Central Division, the Wings play their home games in the Odde Ice Center.

== History ==
Since the team's inaugural season in 2010–11, the Wings have held the highest attendance numbers in their NAHL division, boasting crowds over 1,700. In their first four seasons, the Aberdeen Wings have made the NAHL playoffs twice. The goal of any junior hockey team is to help develop players for the next level. In four seasons, the Wings have had 22 players Division-I college commitments, three players sign professional contracts overseas, and two players drafted in the NHL. During the 2014 NHL Draft, two Aberdeen Wings players were selected. Both taken in the 4th round, goaltender Zach Nagelvoort was drafted by the Edmonton Oilers and defenseman Steven Johnson was selected by the Los Angeles Kings. Wings forward Lennart Palausch signed a professional contract during the 2014 off-season with Heilbronner Falken of the DEL2 in Germany. In the 2013–14 season, the Aberdeen Wings had two players selected to play in the 2014 World Junior Championships for their home countries, including forward Lennart Palausch (Germany) and forward Bjorn Sigurdarson (Iceland).

The 2014–15 was the first season under head coach Francis Anzalone. A native of Sault Ste. Marie, Michigan, Anzalone served as the associate head coach and director of player personnel during the previous season under Wings head coach Travis Winter. During the 2014 off-season, Winter accepted the assistant coach position at his alma mater, Bemidji State University, where he led the Beavers hockey team as captain to the Frozen Four in 2009. Anzalone came from a hockey family that includes his father, Frank Anzalone who was a national championship college hockey coach, minor league head coach, and scout for the Calgary Flames. Anzalone was fired as head coach at the end of the 2015–16 season after two losing seasons and missing the playoffs.

Two days after releasing Anzalone, the Wings announced it had hired long time NAHL coach Scott Langer as head coach. Langer had coached the previous 12 seasons with the Santa Fe/Topeka RoadRunners organization before being released during the 2015–16 season. In his first season as coach of the Wings, the team advanced to the 2017 Robertson Cup tournament and lost to the Aston Rebels. The Wings then won the regular season division titles in each of the following two seasons culminating in the 2019 Robertson Cup league championship. Langer was also named the general manager in January 2019.

In the 2019–20 season, the Wings were again leading the Central Division when the season was curtailed due to the onset of the COVID-19 pandemic. The start of the 2020–21 season was then delayed by one month and was slightly shortened from the typical 60 games to 56 games for the Wings. Despite the shorter season, the Wings set the league record for number of regular season wins with 51 and 103 points. Following the season, Langer was hired as the head coach for the Fargo Force in the United States Hockey League and Steve Jennings was named as the next Wings' head coach. Langer returned as head coach in October 2022.

== Season-by-season records ==
Season	GP	W	L	OTL	PTS	GF	GA	PIM	Finish	Playoffs
2010–11	58	20	34	4	44	166	219	829	6th of 6, Central; 21st of 26, NAHL	Did not qualify
2011–12	60	29	24	7	65	187	177	738	4th of 5, Central; 16th of 28, NAHL	Lost Div. Semifinal series, 1–3 vs. Bismarck Bobcats
2012–13	60	23	30	7	53	157	224	849	5th of 6, Central; 10th of 24, NAHL	Did not qualify
2013–14	60	38	18	4	80	183	140	691	2nd of 5, Central t-6th of 24, NAHL	Lost Div. Semifinal series, 0–3 vs. Bismarck Bobcats
2014–15	60	27	31	2	56	142	165	788	4th of 5, Central; 18th of 24, NAHL	Lost Div. Semifinal series, 0–3 vs. Austin Bruins
2015–16	60	22	27	11	55	131	171	879	6th of 6, Central; 19th of 22, NAHL	Did not qualify
2016–17	60	29	24	7	65	184	185	1119	4th of 6, Central; 14th of 24, NAHL	Won Div. Semifinal series, 3–1 vs. Minot Minotauros; Won Div. Final series, 3–2 vs. Minnesota Wilderness; Lost Robertson Cup Semifinal series, 1–2 vs. Aston Rebels
2017–18	60	39	16	5	83	194	140	931	1st of 6, Central; 6th of 23, NAHL	Lost Div. Semifinal series, 2–3 vs. Minot Minotauros
2018–19	60	47	10	3	97	255	124	1061	1st of 6, Central; 3rd of 24, NAHL	Won Div. Semifinal series, 3–1 vs. Austin Bruins; Won Div. Final series, 3–1 vs. Minot Minotauros; Won Robertson Cup Semifinal series, 2–1 vs. Amarillo Bulls; Won Robertson Cup Championship, 2–1 vs. Fairbanks Ice Dogs
2019–20	51	34	11	6	74	187	122	635	1st of 6, Central; 5th of 26, NAHL	Postseason cancelled due to COVID-19 pandemic
2020–21	56	51	4	1	103	251	75	928	1st of 6, Central; 1st of 23, NAHL	Won Div. Semifinal series, 3–2 vs. Minot Minotauros; Won Div. Final series, 3–0 vs. Bismarck Bobcats; Won Robertson Cup Semifinal series, 2–0 vs. Minnesota Magicians; Lost Robertson Cup Championship, 2–4 vs. Shreveport Mudbugs
2021–22	60	31	24	5	67	186	184	894	3rd of 6, Central; 17th of 29, NAHL	Won Div. Semifinal series, 3–0 vs. Austin Bruins; Lost Div. Final series, 1–3 vs. St. Cloud Norsemen
2022–23	60	30	24	6	66	176	177	969	2nd of 6, Central; 14th of 29, NAHL	Lost Div. Semifinal series, 0–3 vs. St. Cloud Norsemen
2023–24	60	31	24	5	67	187	183	943	3rd of 6 Central, 17 of 32 NAHL	Lost Div. Semifinal series, 2-3 vs. Bismarck Bobcats
2024–25	59	35	22	2	72	195	170	1160	4th of 8 Central, 13 of 35 NAHL	Lost Div. Semifinal series, 2-3 vs. Bismarck Bobcats
2025–26	59	37	16	4	80	225	162	950	3rd of 8 Central, 6 of 34 NAHL	Won Div. Semifinal series, 3–2 vs. Bismarck Bobcats; Lost Div. Final series, 2–3 vs. Austin Bruins
