= Soldotna Regional Sports Complex =

Sports arena in Soldotna, Alaska, U.S.

Coordinates: 60°28′34.46″N 151°6′6.41″W

- Interactive map of Soldotna Regional Sports Complex
- Location: 538 Arena Drive; Soldotna, Alaska 99669
- Owner: The City of Soldotna
- Operator: The City of Soldotna Parks and Rec. Dept.
- Capacity: 2,000 (Ice Hockey)
- Surface: 200' x 100' (Ice Hockey)

Construction
- Opened: 1983

Tenant
- Kenai River Brown Bears (NAHL) (2007–present)

The Soldotna Regional Sports Complex (also referred to as the Soldotna Sports Center) is a 2,000-seat multipurpose arena located in Soldotna, Alaska. The arena opened in 1983. In the winter months, the facility is home to central Kenai Peninsula high school hockey teams, fighting competitions and the soldotna figure skating team while in the summer the facility hosts numerous local home builders, sports recreation and trading, car, and snowmachine shows, among other events.

The facility contains an Olympic-sized ice sheet, a 350-seat conference room, a first aid room, racquetball courts, locker room facilities, ice-resurfacing capabilities, an ADA-accessible seating platform, and a snack bar. The Sports Center also houses offices for the City of Soldotna's Parks and Recreation Department. Since 2007, it has been the home of the Kenai River Brown Bears of the North American Hockey League.

== History ==
The building's inaugural event in the fall of 1983 featured an exhibition hockey contest showcasing the United States and Russian national hockey teams. Since 1983, the Sports Center has played host to several other sporting events, including Harlem Globetrotters and Anchorage Aces games.

Usually billed as "The Showdown in So-Town," The University of Alaska Anchorage Seawolves Division I men's hockey team have played a pair of recent exhibition contests in front of SRO crowds at the Regional Sports Complex – once in 2004 against Grant MacEwan College (where UAA won 5-1), and again in 2006 against the University of Western Ontario (where UWO won 3-1).

The facility was a focal point for the 2006 Arctic Winter Games, hosting both opening and closing ceremonies, hockey games at all levels, figure skating, and speed skating. For the Arctic Winter Games, the Regional Sports Complex installed a new ice rink, a new four-sided center-hung scoreboard, and a new scrolling marquee outside of the facility.

The facility has also been a focal point for Alaska state high school hockey. The facility also hosts the Peninsula Ice Classic tournament (also referred to for a short time as the Peninsula Ice Challenge) – showcasing all 4A (large school) teams from the Central Peninsula area, as well as one team from the Anchorage (Cook Inlet Conference) and Fairbanks (Mid-Alaska Conference) areas. The facility was also home to the ASAA State High School Hockey Championships from 2000 up until 2004, when the tournament moved to Big Dipper Ice Arena in Fairbanks for 2005 and 2006, then on to the Curtis D. Menard Memorial Sports Center in 2007.
