= 2021–22 BCHL season =

- League: BCHL
- Sport: Hockey
- Duration: Regular season October 8 2021 – March 27 2022; Playoffs; April 1 2022 – May 18 2022
- Teams: 18

Fred Page Cup
- Champions: Penticton Vees

BCHL seasons
- ← 2020–21 2022–23 →

The 2021–22 BCHL season was the 60th season of the British Columbia Hockey League (BCHL). The eighteen teams from the Coastal and Interior Conferences played 54 game schedules. The 2021 BCHL Showcase occurred shortly after the start of the season on October 20–24, 2021, in Chilliwack. In April, teams played for the Fred Page Cup, the BCHL championship, won by the Penticton Vees.

This was the first full season to be played since the BCHL left the Canadian Junior Hockey League, and as a result would not play for the Doyle Cup regional championship nor the Centennial Cup national championship.

== League changes ==
Map of BCHL, 2021–22 to 2022–23
Coastal Division
Interior Division

Changes to the league alignment and schedule that were originally to take place during the 2020–21 BCHL season came into effect. The Prince George Spruce Kings and Cranbrook Bucks joined the seven teams in the Interior Division to form the Interior Conference and the remaining nine teams from the Mainland and Island divisions were merged into the Coastal Conference. The Board of Governors also approved the use of video review for those teams and rinks that wish to implement it.

The league introduced policies aimed at reducing fighting in games, including mandatory suspension if a player receives a second major penalty for fighting during the season, and allowing the league to review fights and assess instigator and/or aggressor penalties after the fact.

The league introduced an initiative it called "live scoring" to improve the accuracy of its statistics.

== Pandemic effects and postponed games ==
At the start of the season, border restrictions for Canadians heading into the United States were still in effect due to the ongoing COVID-19 pandemic. As a result, four home games for the Wenatchee Wild for the month of October were postponed. When it became apparent that these restrictions would continue, the league created a travel plan to allow the Wild to play games at home in Wenatchee for the season, but cancelled the four home games that were initially postponed. Because the league schedule was uneven at the time, it was decided that regular season results would be determined by points percentage rather than total points. In January, a wave of infections caused by the Omicron variant caused half of the teams in the league to be placed into COVID protocol, resulting in several games being postponed.

In mid-November 2021, a heavy storm system traveled through the Pacific Northwest causing severe flooding in the region. On November 30, the BCHL cancelled all remaining inter-conference games as a result of damage sustained to the province's highway system during the flooding and mudslides in the Fraser Valley. The cancelled games were rescheduled featuring teams within the same conference with some previously postponed games to be made up at a later date.

On January 24, 2022, the BCHL announced that the end date of the regular season had been moved from Marth 20 to March 27 in order to make up games missed as a result of the pandemic and from the extreme weather events, with a tentative playoffs start date of April 1. This allowed all teams to play full 54 game schedules.

== Standings ==
Note: GP = Games Played, W = Wins, L = Losses, T/O/S = Ties/Overtime Losses/Shootout Losses, Pts = Points
x = clinched playoff spot
y = clinched division
z = regular season champion

Coastal Conference
TEAM NAMES	GP	W	L	T/O/S	Pts
xy – Alberni Valley Bulldogs	54	35	13	4	74
x – Chilliwack Chiefs	54	33	17	4	70
x – Nanaimo Clippers	54	33	17	4	70
x – Langley Rivermen	54	33	18	3	69
x – Victoria Grizzlies	54	29	25	0	58
x – Surrey Eagles	54	28	26	0	56
x – Coquitlam Express	54	22	26	6	50
x – Cowichan Valley Capitals	54	15	33	6	36
Powell River Kings	54	13	32	9	35

Interior Conference
TEAM NAMES	GP	W	L	T/O/S	Pts
xyz – Penticton Vees	54	43	8	3	89
x – Salmon Arm Silverbacks	54	36	12	6	78
x – West Kelowna Warriors	54	37	16	1	75
x – Prince George Spruce Kings	54	27	15	12	66
x – Cranbrook Bucks	54	29	20	5	63
x – Vernon Vipers	54	27	20	7	61
x – Wenatchee Wild	54	22	26	6	50
x – Trail Smoke Eaters	54	20	29	5	45
Merritt Centennials	54	3	47	4	10

== Post-season ==
=== 2022 BCHL Fred Page Cup playoffs ===
Playoff results

First round
Alberni Valley	4
Cowichan Valley	0
Langley	4
Victoria	1
Nanaimo	4
Surrey	0
Chilliwack	4
Coquitlam	3
Penticton	4
Trail	1
Prince George	4
Cranbrook	2
West Kelowna	4
Vernon	1
Salmon Arm	4
Wenatchee	3

Second round
Alberni Valley	2
Langley	4
Nanaimo	4
Chilliwack	0
Penticton	4
Prince George	0
West Kelowna	4
Salmon Arm	1

Semi-finals
Langley	0
Nanaimo	4
Penticton	4
West Kelowna	0

Fred Page Cup Final
Nanaimo	0
Penticton	4

== Scoring leaders ==
GP = Games Played, G = Goals, A = Assists, P = Points, PIM = Penalties In Minutes

Player	Team	GP	G	A	Pts	PIM
Matthew Wood	Victoria Grizzlies	46	45	40	85	33
Ellis Rickwood	Victoria Grizzlies	50	21	59	80	33
Simon Tassy	Salmon Arm Silverbacks	53	38	40	78	28
Tyson Dyck	Cranbrook Bucks	54	34	41	75	58
Luc Wilson	Penticton Vees	52	29	46	75	34
Josh Nadeau	Penticton Vees	54	40	32	72	21
Sean Donaldson	Nanaimo Clippers	47	36	34	70	47
Cameron Johnson	Chilliwack Chiefs	54	25	40	65	10
Noah Serdachny	Salmon Arm Silverbacks	54	27	35	62	14
Felix Trudeau	West Kelowna Warriors	49	27	34	61	34

== Leading goaltenders ==
Note: GP = Games Played, Mins = Minutes Played, W = Wins, L = Losses, OTL = Overtime Losses, GA = Goals Against, SO = Shutouts, Sv% = Save Percentage, GAA = Goals Against Average.

Player	Team	GP	Mins	W	L	OTL	GA	SO	Sv%	GAA
Jordan Fairlie	Prince George Spruce Kings	20	1136	7	4	7	38	2	0.918	2.01
Kaeden Lane	Penticton Vees	34	1974	28	3	2	68	6	0.910	2.07
Aaron Trotter	Prince George Spruce Kings	37	2146	20	11	5	80	2	0.914	2.24
Owen Say	Salmon Arm Silverbacks	38	2282	23	10	5	93	3	0.923	2.44
Grant Riley	Chilliwack Chiefs	38	2185	25	10	1	90	3	0.907	2.53

== Award winners ==
- Brett Hull Trophy (Top Scorer): Matthew Wood (Victoria Grizzlies)
- Best Defenceman: Tyson Jugnauth (West Kelowna Warriors)
- Bruce Allison Memorial Trophy (Rookie of the Year): Matthew Wood (Victoria Grizzlies)
- Bob Fenton Trophy (Most Sportsmanlike): Cameron Johnson (Chilliwack Chiefs)
- Top Goaltender: Owen Say (Salmon Arm Silverbacks)
- Wally Forslund Memorial Trophy (Best Goaltending Duo): Kaeden Lane & Carter Serhyenko (Penticton Vees)
- Vern Dye Memorial Trophy (regular-season MVP): Simon Tassy (Salmon Arm Silverbacks
- Joe Tennant Memorial Trophy (Coach of the Year): Fred Harbinson (Penticton Vees)
- Ron Boileau Memorial Trophy (Best Regular Season Record): Penticton Vees
- Cliff McNabb Memorial Trophy (Coastal Conference champions): Nanaimo Clippers
- Ryan Hatfield Trophy (Interior Conference champions): Penticton Vees
- Fred Page Cup (League Champions): Penticton Vees

== Players selected in 2022 NHL entry draft ==
Tyson Jugnauth (West Kelowna Warriors) - Round 4, Pick 100 - Seattle Kraken
Eli Barnett (Victoria Grizzlies) - Round 7, Pick 195 - San Jose Sharks
Tyson Dyck (Cranbrook Bucks) - Round 7, Pick 206 - Ottawa Senators
Abram Wiebe (Chilliwack Chiefs) - Round 7, Pick 209 - Vegas Golden Knights
Cade Littler (Wenatchee Wild) - Round 7, Pick 219 - Calgary Flames

== See also ==
- 2021 in ice hockey
- 2022 in ice hockey
