= Corpus Christi IceRays =

- City: Corpus Christi, Texas
- League: NAHL
- Division: South Division
- Founded: 2001
- Home arena: American Bank Center
- Colors: Red, black, white
- General manager: Ryan Bennett (Hired 2022)
- Head coach: Nick Skerlick (2025)
- Affiliates: Austin Ice Bats (NA3HL)

Franchise history
- 2001–2003: Pittsburgh Forge
- 2003–2005: Toledo IceDiggers
- 2005–2010: Alpena IceDiggers
- 2010–present: Corpus Christi IceRays

The Corpus Christi IceRays are a Tier II junior ice hockey team playing in the North American Hockey League (NAHL). The IceRays are based in Corpus Christi, Texas, and play in the North American Hockey League's South Division. The "IceRays" moniker derives from the many different species of stingrays that inhabit the nearby Gulf of Mexico.

== History ==
IceDiggers logo

The franchise originally joined the NAHL as the Pittsburgh Forge from 2001 to 2003. They relocated to Toledo, Ohio, and became the Toledo IceDiggers from 2003 to 2005. They then became the Alpena IceDiggers, playing in the Northern Lights Arena located in Alpena, Michigan, from 2005 to 2010.

The original IceRays organization was established in 1998 and played in the minor-professional Western Professional Hockey League (WPHL) from 1998 to 2001 and the Central Hockey League from 2001 to 2010. Following the 2009–10 season, the IceRays' ownership purchased the IceDiggers franchise and transferred the IceRays' name, logo, colors, management, and coaching staff to the NAHL franchise before folding their CHL franchise. The new IceRays junior franchise played their first game on September 15, 2010, against the Traverse City North Stars at the NAHL Showcase, falling 1–0. The IceRays played their first junior game at the American Bank Center on October 1, 2010, against the Wichita Falls Wildcats, winning 4–3 in a shootout.

During the 2011–12 season, IceRays goaltender Anthony Stolarz was scouted heavily by the National Hockey League (NHL), ending the season fourth in the NHL Central Scouting List among North American goaltenders. On June 23, 2012, Stolarz became the first player in IceRays junior franchise history to be drafted by an NHL franchise, joining the Philadelphia Flyers as the 45th overall pick (2nd Round).

After just three seasons in the NAHL, the IceRays earned their first playoff bid during the 2012–13 season, finishing with a 28–26–6 record and fourth in the South Division under former head coach and professional player, Justin Quenneville. The IceRays won their first playoff game on April 5, 2013, against the Amarillo Bulls in a 2–1 road victory before falling in three-straight games to drop the best-of-five series. Following that season, Quenneville stepped down as head coach after two years at the helm, making way for new hire John Becanic to take over for the next three seasons.

The IceRays set multiple franchise records during the 2014–15 season, marking the best record in junior franchise history at 31–24–5 and their second appearance in the Robertson Cup Playoffs. The team would fall in two-straight games at the American Bank Center to the Wenatchee Wild in the South Division Quarterfinals, 3–2 (SO) and 3–2, respectively. On Feb. 7, 2015, the IceRays set a junior franchise record for the highest attendance as well as a league attendance mark, bringing in 6,965 fans during the annual Stars & Stripes Night, honoring military, first responders and law enforcement.

In the 2015–16 season, the IceRays set one more junior franchise milestone thanks to former goaltender Pheonix Copley. On Feb. 27, 2016, the 24-year-old replaced St. Louis Blues goaltender Jake Allen with 4:26 remaining in the second period, marking the first player in junior franchise history to earn playing time in the NHL.

On June 30, 2016, the IceRays hired former assistant coach Brad Flynn as the team's fourth head coach in junior franchise history. Flynn left after the 2017–18 season to become an assistant coach with the Red Deer Rebels in the Western Hockey League. He was replaced by Ryan Cruthers, who had been with the Chicago Steel the previous season. Cruthers was hired as an assistant for Robert Morris University in 2019 and Al Rooney was promoted for the 2019–20 season. Rooney was fired after less than a season and a 13–33–3–3 record to be replaced by assistant Nate Weossner in the interim.

The end of the 2019–20 season was cancelled due to the COVID-19 pandemic with the team already eliminated from the playoffs. The IceRays withdrew from participation in the 2020–21 season due to the on-going complications during the pandemic. Prior to their return in the 2021–22 season, Michael Lysyj was named the new head coach.

== Season-by-season records ==
Season	GP	W	L	OTL	Pts	GF	GA	PIM	Finish	Playoffs
Toledo IceDiggers
2003–04	56	13	38	5	31	146	243	1,375	6th, North	Did not qualify
2004–05	56	18	35	3	39	149	234	1,424	6th, North	Did not qualify
Alpena IceDiggers
2005–06	58	13	38	7	33	147	260	1,339	5th, North	Did not qualify
2006–07	62	37	20	5	79	232	194	1,447	2nd, North	Lost 1st Round, 0–3 vs. Team USA
2007–08	58	30	23	5	65	184	177	969	3rd, North	Lost 1st Round, 0–3 vs. Mahoning Valley Phantoms
2008–09	58	27	25	6	60	157	184	1,125	4th, North	Lost 1st Round, 1–3 vs. Team USA
2009–10	58	22	34	2	46	169	201	1,555	5th, North	Did not qualify
Corpus Christi IceRays
2010–11	58	19	34	5	43	158	238	2,079	5th, South	Did not qualify
2011–12	60	26	29	5	57	169	199	1,170	5th, South	Did not qualify
2012–13	60	28	26	6	62	194	200	1441	4th, South	Lost Div. Semifinals, 1–3 vs. Amarillo Bulls
2013–14	60	19	31	10	38	124	178	1386	6th, South	Did not qualify
2014–15	60	31	24	5	67	186	196	1348	3rd of 8, South	Lost South Play-in Series, 0–2 vs. Wenatchee Wild
2015–16	60	25	29	6	56	139	170	1145	5th of 6, South	Did not qualify
2016–17	60	32	19	9	73	183	155	1290	3rd of 7, South	Won Div. Semifinals, 3–0 vs. Shreveport Mudbugs; Lost Div. Finals, 2–3 vs. Lone Star Brahmas
2017–18	60	27	23	10	64	160	177	1302	4th of 6, South	Lost Div. Semifinals, 2–3 vs. Shreveport Mudbugs
2018–19	60	29	28	3	61	182	196	1350	4th of 6, South	Lost Div. Semifinals, 2–3 vs. Amarillo Bulls
2019–20	53	16	30	7	39	102	156	726	5th of 7, South	Season cancelled
2020–21	Did not participate due to the COVID-19 pandemic									
2021–22	60	25	32	3	53	155	213	1209	7th of 8, South; 26th of 29, NAHL	Did not qualify
2022–23	60	11	42	7	29	140	255	1218	8th of 8, South; 28th of 29, NAHL	Did not qualify
2023-24	60	19	35	6	44	154	239	1299	8th of 9, South; 29th of 32, NAHL	Did not qualifty
2024-25	44	28	13	3	59	146	119	1053	3rd of 9 South; 10th of 32 NAHL	Won Div. Playin, 2–0 Colorado Grit; Won Div. Semifinals, 3-0 Shreveport Mudbugs; Lost Div Finals 0=3 (Lone Star Brahmas)
