= McKelvie =

McKelvie is a surname. Notable people with the surname include:

- Chris McKelvie (born 1985), American ice hockey player
- Christina McKelvie (1968–2025), Scottish politician
- Danny McKelvie (born 1969), Scottish rugby league player
- Danny McKelvie (footballer) (born 1980), Scottish footballer
- Ian McKelvie, New Zealand politician
- Jamie McKelvie (born 1980), British cartoonist and illustrator
- Jennifer McKelvie (born 1977), Canadian politician in Ontario
- Red McKelvie, New Zealand musician
- Robert McKelvie (1912–1996), English cricketer
- Roderick R. McKelvie (born 1946), American judge
- Samuel Roy McKelvie (1881–1956), American politician
- Susan McKelvie (born 1985), Scottish hammer thrower
- Zach McKelvie (born 1985), American ice hockey player

== See also ==
- Mount McKelvie, a mountain of Canada
- Samuel R. McKelvie National Forest, a forest in Nebraska, United States
