= George Tuck =

George Tuck may refer to:

- George Tuck (basketball) (1882–1952), American college basketball player
- George Tuck (cricketer) (1843–1920), English lawyer and cricketer
- George Albert Tuck (1884–1981), New Zealand builder, soldier and diarist
