= Sacred Heart Church, Caterham =

Sacred Heart Church
- Church of the Sacred Heart of Jesus, Caterham
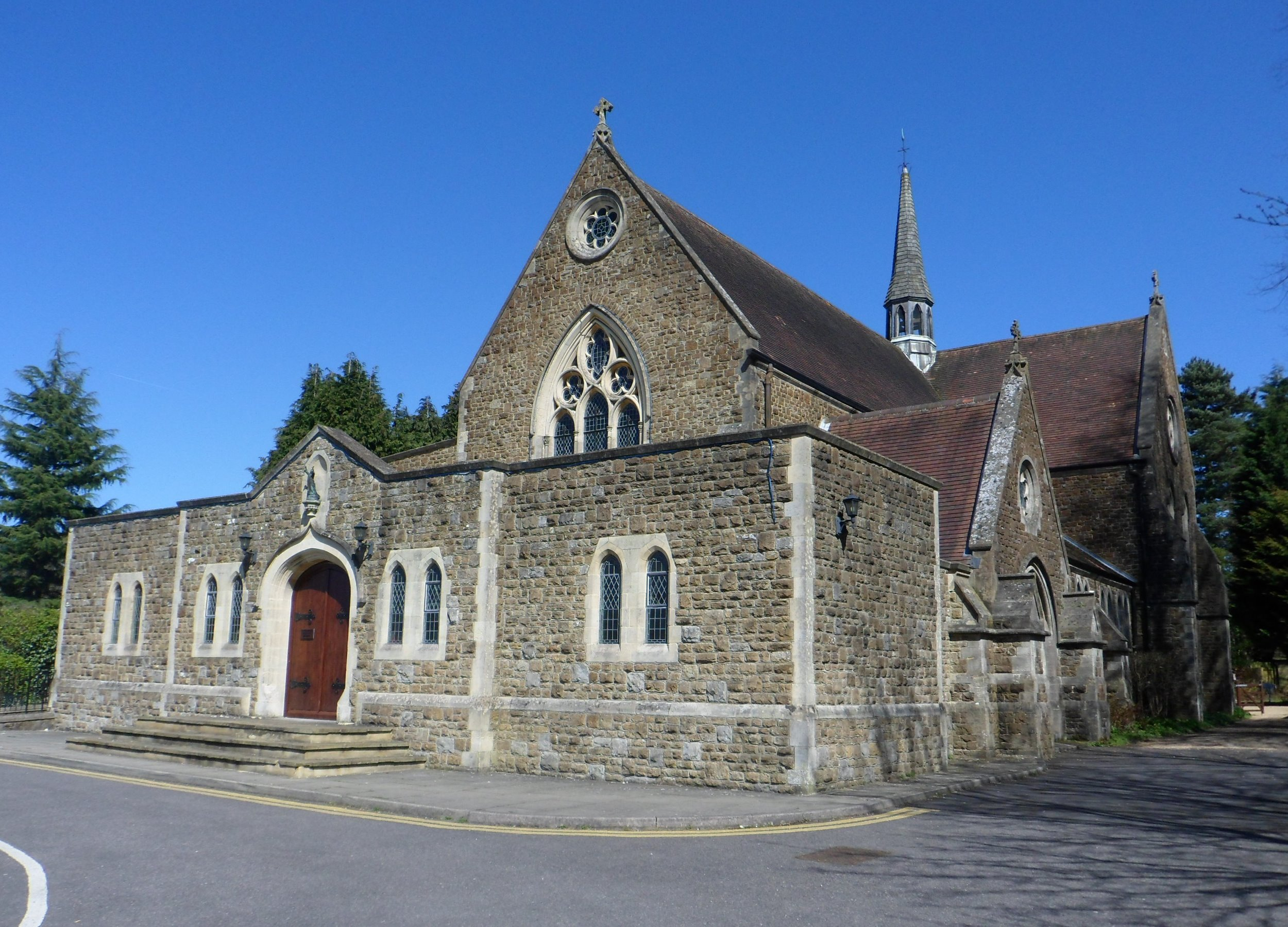
- Church entrance

- Location in Surrey
- 51°17′15″N 0°05′12″W
- Location: Caterham, Surrey
- Country: England
- Denomination: Roman Catholic
- Website: CaterhamCatholic.co.uk

History
- Status: Active
- Founded: 24 August 1879
- Founder: Fr Francis Roe
- Dedication: Most Sacred Heart of Jesus

Architecture
- Functional status: Parish church
- Heritage designation: Grade II listed
- Designated: 19 November 1984
- Architect: Edward Ingress Bell
- Style: Gothic Revival
- Groundbreaking: 24 June 1880
- Completed: 11 August 1881
- Construction cost: £5,000

Administration
- Province: Southwark
- Diocese: Arundel and Brighton
- Deanery: Redhill

Sacred Heart Church or formally the Church of the Sacred Heart of Jesus is a Roman Catholic parish church in Caterham, Surrey, England designed by Ingress Bell and built in 1881. It is situated between Essendene Road and Whyteleafe Road off the High Street. The building is Grade II listed.

== Construction ==
In 1879, after a request from Francis Parson, a local Catholic, the Bishop of Southwark, James Danell, sent Fr Francis Roe to Caterham to serve as priest there. His first Mass was on 24 August 1879 in a local depot, where army officers built a temporary chapel. Before this, a priest from Croydon travelled to Caterham to celebrate Mass for soldiers and local Catholics.

On 24 June 1880, the foundation stone of the church was laid by Bishop Danell. Most of the construction was paid for by Fr Roe's father, Captain William Harriott Roe. The architect for the church was Ingress Bell, who also designed St Joseph Church in Guildford (demolished in the 1980s) in 1881. He adopted the Early English Gothic Revival style and a cruciform plan.

On 11 August 1881 the church was opened. The first Mass was celebrated by the Archbishop of Westminster, Cardinal Manning.

== Interior ==
Joseph Aloysius Pippet designed murals which illustrate the life of Jesus; they were painted around the apse, and windows built, by Hardman & Co.; the central apse window dates from 1881 and the murals and other windows from 1889. In 1907 it was stated that "[t]he sanctuary has been recently adorned with elegant mosaic pictures".

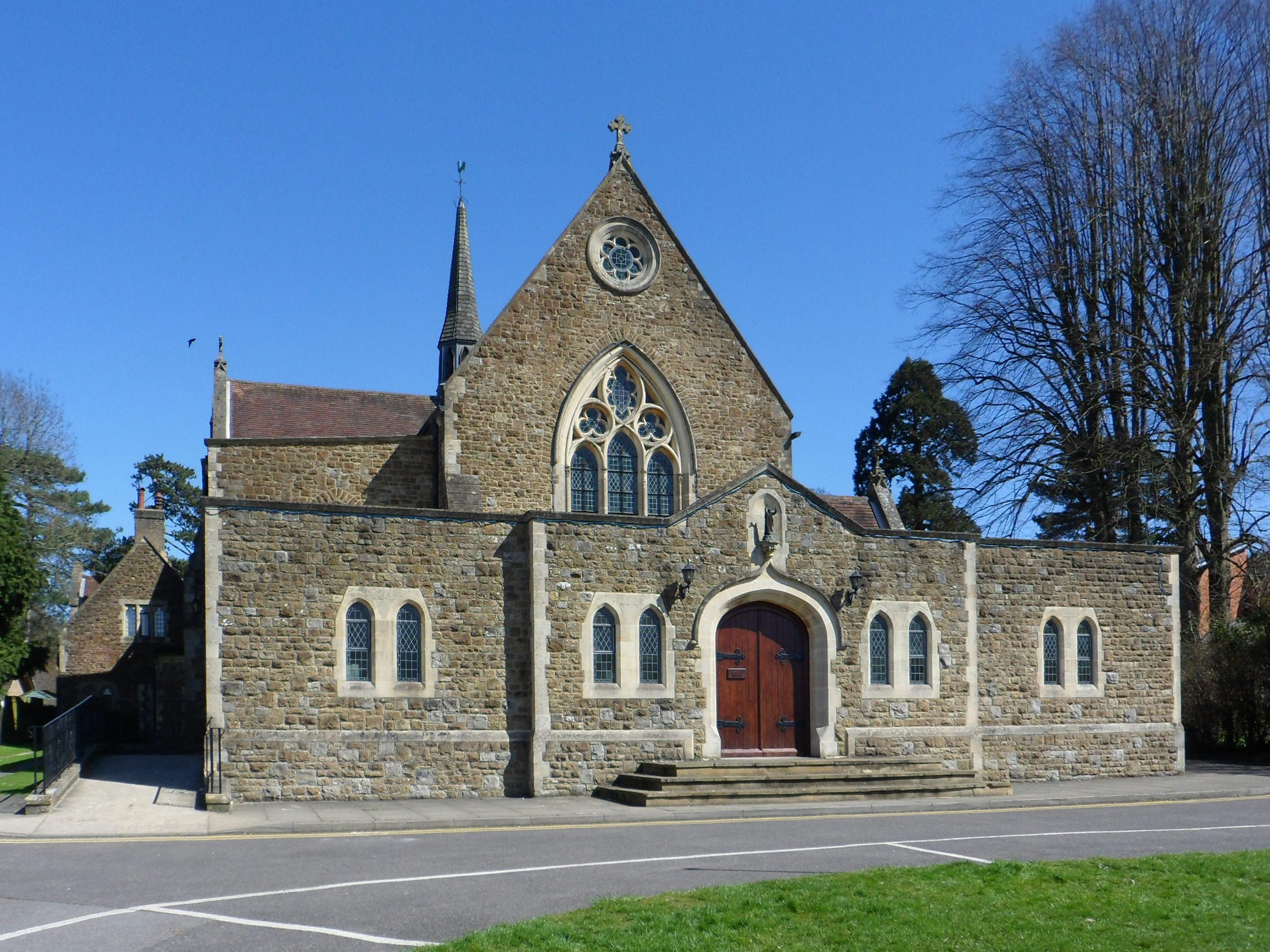
Church of the Sacred Heart

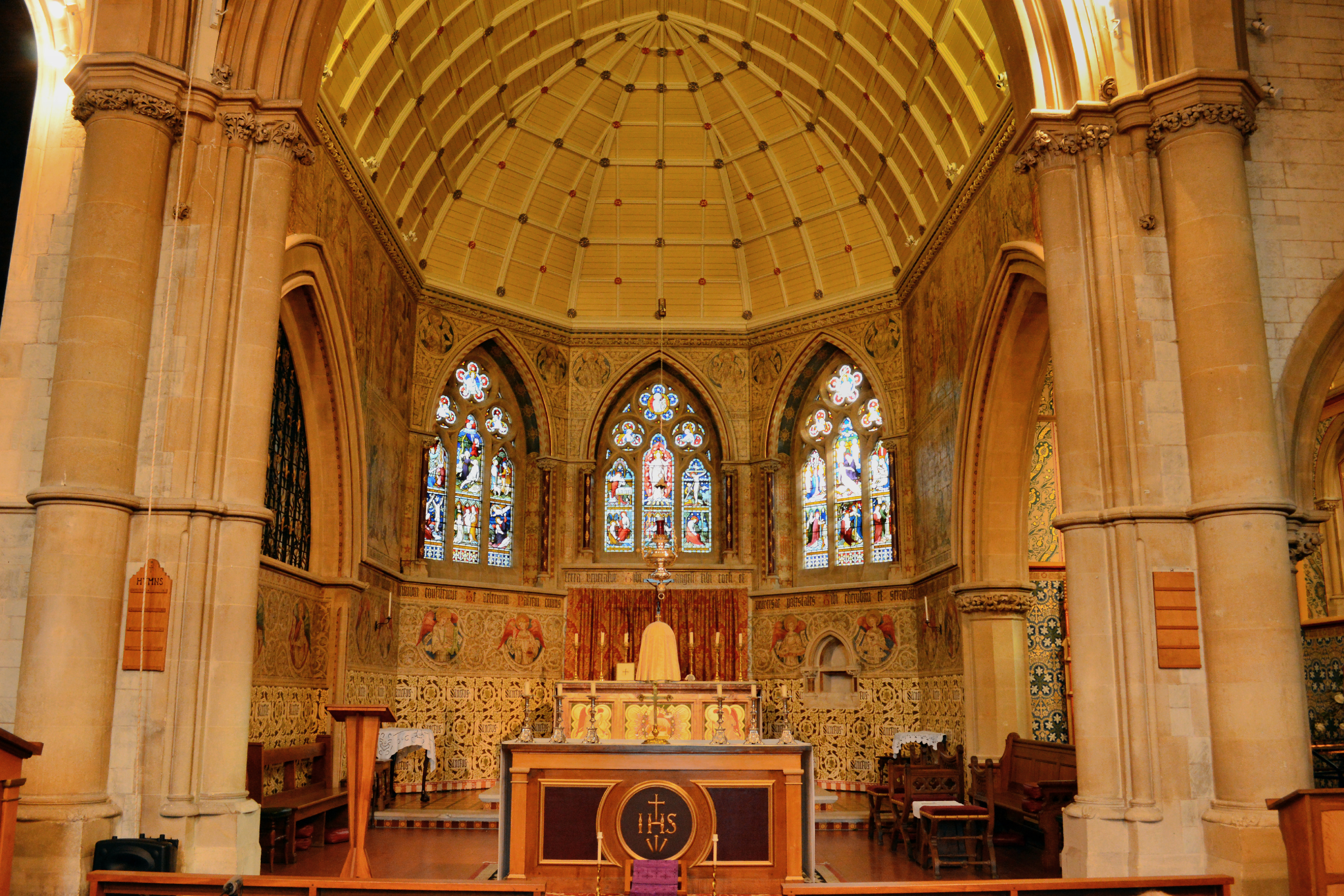
Chancel

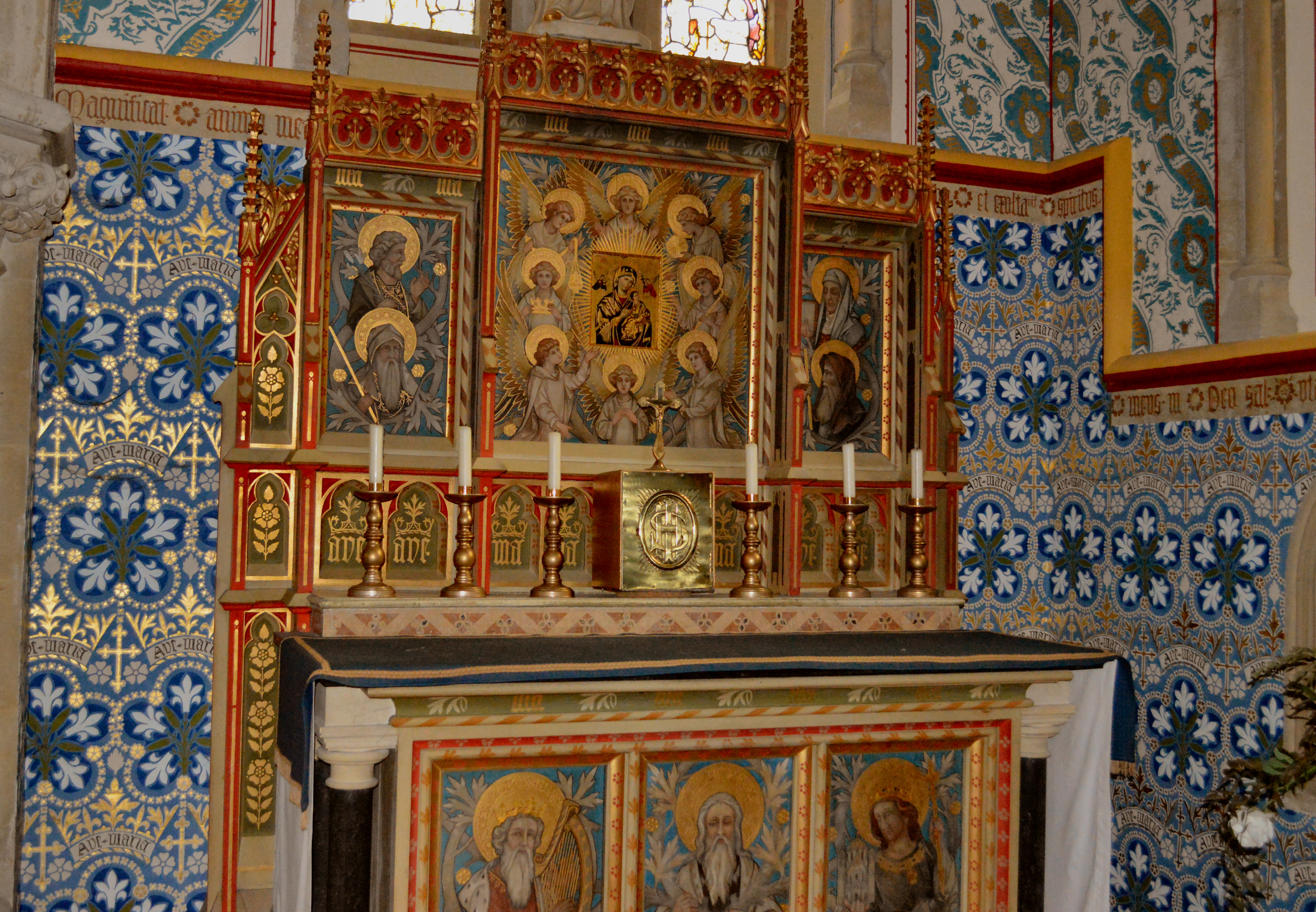
South chapel

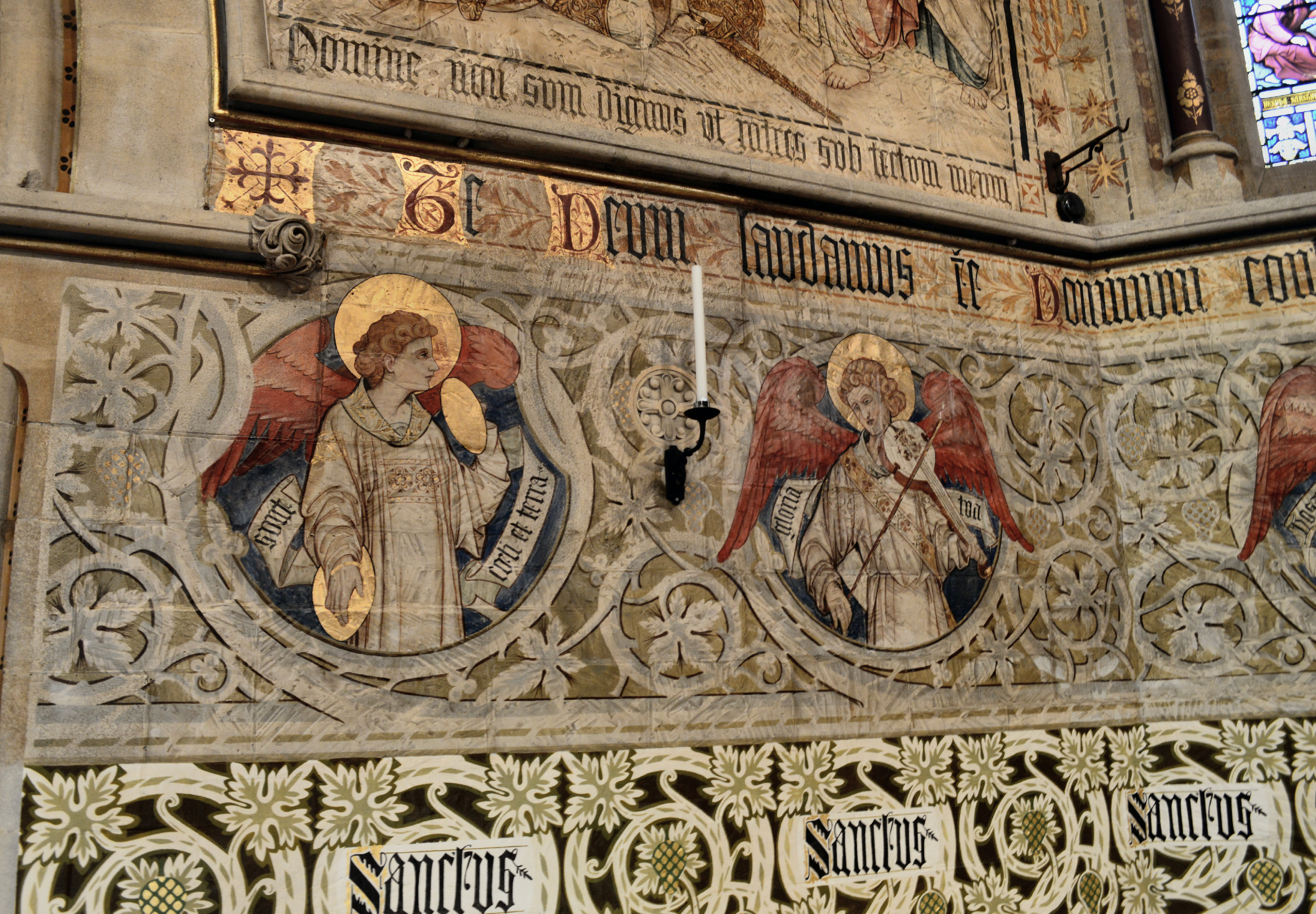
Angels in the Apse

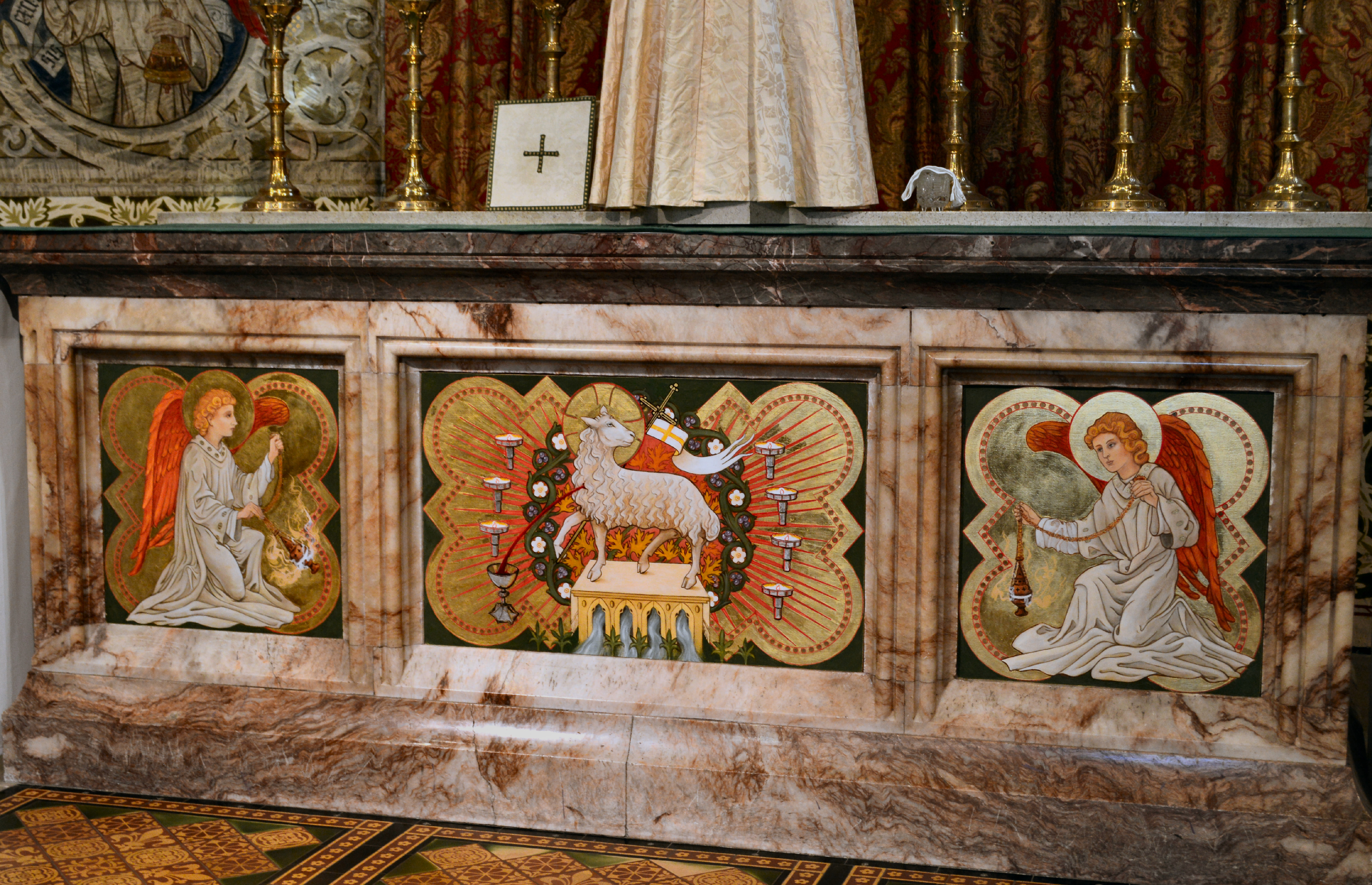
Altar

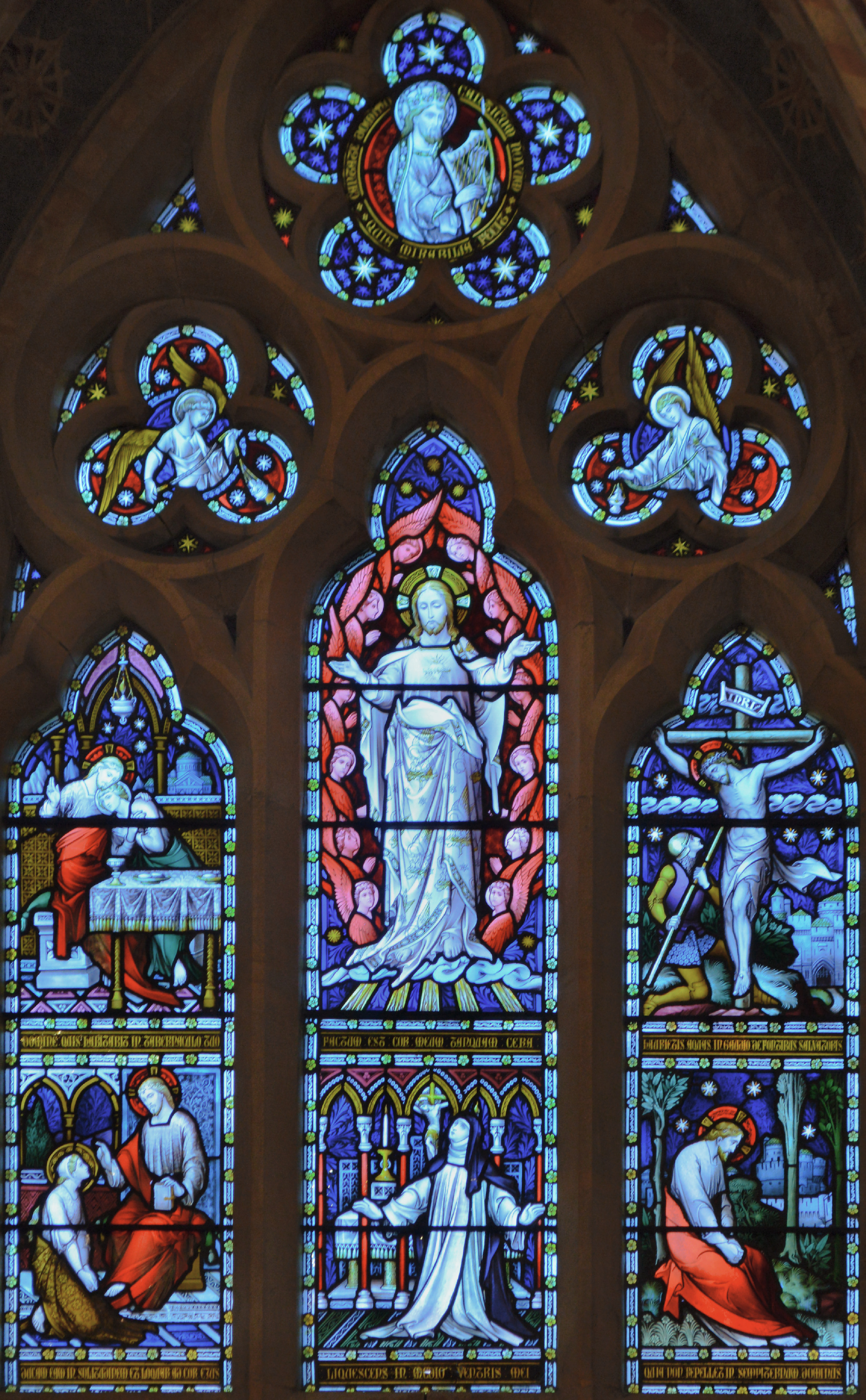
Apse window

== Parish ==
The parish covers the Catholic population of Caterham, Whyteleafe and Godstone. The church celebrates a Mass every day, and three on Sundays. Services are livestreamed and recorded. The Pippet murals were badly damaged by water ingress and attempts at repair; they were conserved and restored from 2015. The church is a member of the Latin Mass Society of England and Wales.

== See also ==
- List of places of worship in Tandridge (district)

== Bibliography ==
- Kelly, Bernard W. (1907). Historical Notes on English Catholic Missions (PDF). London: Kegan Paul, Trench, Trübner & Co.
- Sladen, Teresa; Antram, Nicholas (11 November 2005). Architectural and Historic Review of Churches in the Roman Catholic Diocese of Arundel and Brighton (PDF) (Report). English Heritage. Archived from the original (PDF) on 6 March 2016.
