= Gadowsky =

Gadowsky is a surname. Notable people with the surname include:

- Guy Gadowsky (born 1967), Canadian ice hockey player and coach
- Mac Gadowsky (born 2002), American ice hockey player
