= Chris McKelvie =

American ice hockey player (born 1985)

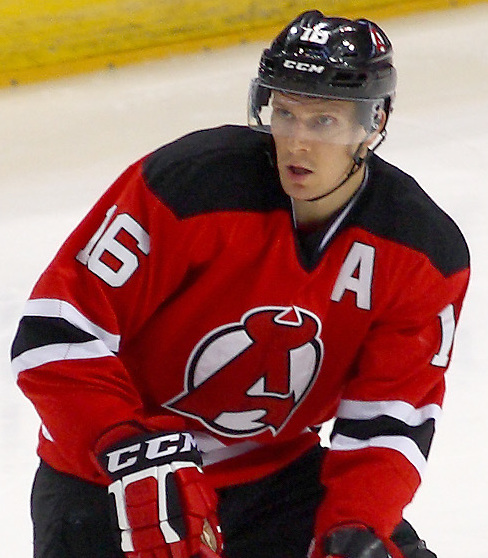
- McKelvie with the Albany Devils
- Born: February 22, 1985 (age 41) New Brighton, MN, USA
- Height: 6 ft 1 in (185 cm)
- Weight: 190 lb (86 kg; 13 st 8 lb)
- Position: Forward
- Shot: Left
- Played for: Hartford Wolf Pack; Connecticut Whale; Albany Devils
- NHL draft: Undrafted
- Playing career: 2010–2016

Chris McKelvie (born February 22, 1985) is an American former professional ice hockey player. He last played with the Albany Devils of the American Hockey League (AHL).

== Playing career ==
McKelvie played hockey at Irondale High School in New Brighton, Minnesota and then spent three seasons with the Bozeman IceDogs in the NAHL. In 2006, he began his education at Bemidji State University, playing four seasons of college hockey with the NCAA Division I Bemidji State Beavers men's ice hockey team, where he served as the team captain in his senior year.

On April 1, 2010, McKelvie was signed to his first professional contract by the Hartford Wolf Pack, and he played six games with the American Hockey League team towards the end of their 2009–10 season.

In September 2012, McKelvie was signed by the Albany Devils to an AHL contract. After serving as an alternate captain in his last three seasons with the Devils, McKelvie announced his retirement from professional hockey at the conclusion of the 2015–16 season, in order to pursue a coaching position as an assistant with the Army NCAA Team.

== Personal life ==
McKelvie's twin brother, Zach, is a former professional ice hockey player, and current head coach for Army.

== Career statistics ==
			Regular season					Playoffs
Season	Team	League	GP	G	A	Pts	PIM	GP	G	A	Pts	PIM
2003–04	Bozeman IceDogs	NAHL	38	2	6	8	40	—	—	—	—	—
2004–05	Bozeman IceDogs	NAHL	18	4	8	12	35	—	—	—	—	—
2005–06	Bozeman IceDogs	NAHL	51	23	33	56	139	11	2	3	5	29
2006–07	Bemidji State University	CHA	11	1	0	1	12	—	—	—	—	—
2007–08	Bemidji State University	CHA	35	6	1	7	16	—	—	—	—	—
2008–09	Bemidji State University	CHA	37	3	4	7	34	—	—	—	—	—
2009–10	Bemidji State University	CHA	37	8	10	18	26	—	—	—	—	—
2009–10	Hartford Wolf Pack	AHL	6	2	1	3	2	—	—	—	—	—
2010–11	Hartford Wolf Pack/CT Whale	AHL	17	1	2	3	22	—	—	—	—	—
2010–11	Greenville Road Warriors	ECHL	16	3	3	6	20	10	2	2	4	13
2011–12	Connecticut Whale	AHL	38	2	3	5	42	—	—	—	—	—
2011–12	Greenville Road Warriors	ECHL	11	3	2	5	13	3	1	1	2	6
2012–13	Albany Devils	AHL	47	4	10	14	71	—	—	—	—	—
2012–13	Trenton Titans	ECHL	2	1	1	2	2	—	—	—	—	—
2013–14	Albany Devils	AHL	57	9	12	21	86	3	0	0	0	9
2014–15	Albany Devils	AHL	56	3	5	8	74	—	—	—	—	—
2015–16	Albany Devils	AHL	46	1	6	7	39	3	0	0	0	0
AHL totals			267	22	39	61	336	6	0	0	0	9
