= St Augustine of England Church, Solihull =

Coordinates: 52.4139°N 1.7811°W

St Augustine of England Church
- St Augustine's Church
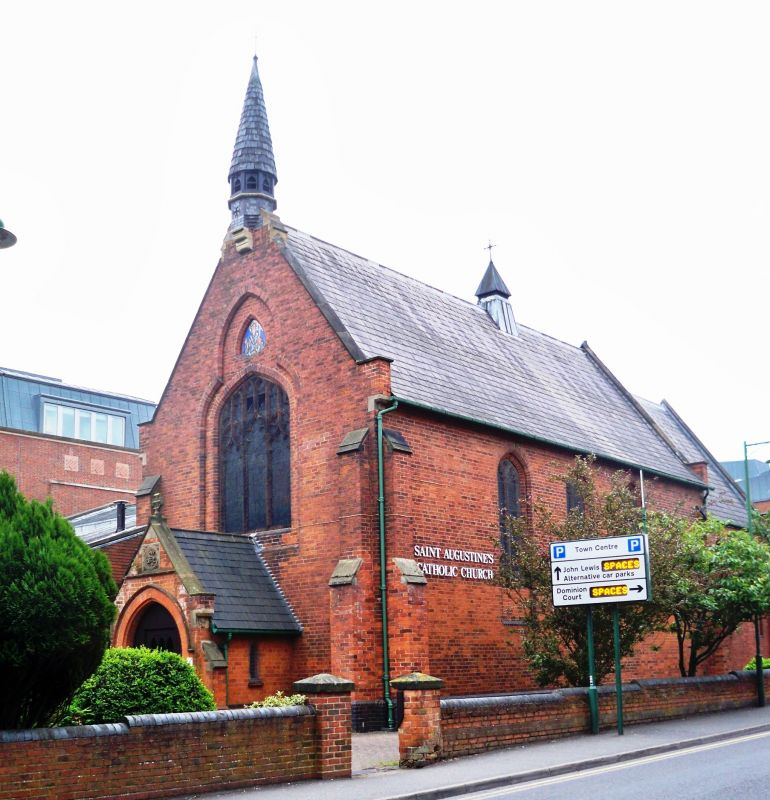
- St Augustine of England Church
- OS grid reference: SP 14982 79564
- Location: Solihull
- Country: England
- Denomination: Roman Catholic
- Website: StAugustineSolihull.org.uk

History
- Status: Active
- Founder: Pippet family
- Dedication: Augustine of Canterbury
- Consecrated: 12 July 1932

Architecture
- Functional status: Parish church
- Heritage designation: Grade II listed
- Designated: 5 December 1949
- Architect: Augustus Pugin
- Style: Gothic Revival
- Groundbreaking: April 1838
- Completed: 6 February 1839

Administration
- Province: Birmingham
- Archdiocese: Birmingham
- Deanery: Birmingham East & North
- Parish: St Augustine

St Augustine of England Church or St Augustine's Church is a Catholic parish church in Solihull, West Midlands, England. It was built from 1838 to 1839, eleven years before the reestablishment of the Catholic dioceses in 1850. It was designed by Augustus Pugin. According to Historic England, it is Pugin's "earliest surviving church design". Pugin designed it in the Gothic Revival style. It is located on the corner of Station Road and Herbert Road in the centre of Solihull. In 1949, it was designated a Grade II listed building.

== History ==
=== Origin ===
After the English Reformation, during the penal years of recusancy, Catholics in Solihull would go to Baddesley Clinton to receive the sacraments. In 1760, on the site of the current church, a chapel was built behind a house so that it was not visible from the street. It was built by Mr Hugford Hassall, who was related to Margaret Kempson, the wife of Thomas Ferrers of Baddesley Clinton.

=== Construction ===
In April 1838, construction work started on the church. Augustus Pugin was the architect. He worked on the church free of charge. He also donated some of the furnishings, such as a triptych that hung behind the high altar, originally from Flanders. Additional work was done by Thomas Roddis (d. 1845) who also worked on St Giles' Catholic Church, Cheadle, and John Hardman Jr (d. 1865). The church is in the Gothic Revival style with a focus on looking more Early English Gothic. On 6 February 1839, the church was opened by Henry Weedall. Hardman and Pugin both played a role in the opening Mass. Hardman was one of the singers and Pugin carried the processional cross.

=== Developments ===
After its construction, more furnishings were added to the church, and extensions were made. Most of the extension work was funded by the Pippet family of Solihull. In 1866, a window, by Hardman & Co., was put into place in the eastern wall of the church. In 1870, a reredos was installed below the window. It was designed by Joseph Aloysius Pippet. In 1878, a new chancel was added to the church, and the triptych and reredos were moved into it. In 1892, Joseph Pippet added two more statues and enlarged some of the windows. In 1897, a new bell and belfry were added. In 1900, a baptistry and gallery were installed. In 1917, a pulpit was donated by the church congregation. In 1920, a rood cross was installed and acted as a war memorial for the First World War. It was designed and painted by Odilia, Regina and Elphege Pippet. In 1930, the nave was redecorated by Hardman and the Pippets according to plans made in 1892. In 1932, a Lourdes grotto was made in the church garden, again designed by Elphege Pippet. On 12 July 1932, the church was consecrated. In 1939, the stations of the cross were replaced with new ones. In the 1970s, with a growing congregation, plans were drawn up to enlarge the church. From January to December 1979, despite objections from The Victorian Society, work was done to enlarge the church by building a new space to the north of the church, sitting at right angles to the altar. The presbytery, baptistry, and north wall were demolished to make space for it. However, the capacity of the church was doubled. In 2010, the chancel was renovated and a new altar was consecrated.

== Parish ==
The church has its own parish. In the parish is St Augustine's Catholic Primary School. The church has three Sunday Masses at 12:30pm on Saturday and at 9:00 am and 11:00 am on Sunday.

== See also ==
- Archdiocese of Birmingham
