= Ingress Bell =

English architect

Edward Ingress Bell (1837–1914) was an English architect of the late 19th century, and early 20th century, who worked for many years with Sir Aston Webb.

Bell was born in Ingress Park, Greenhithe, Kent, and had already undertaken commissions before he entered into partnership with Webb. The Victoria Law Courts in Birmingham was the first major public building they jointly undertook. He died in East Preston, Sussex.

== Projects ==
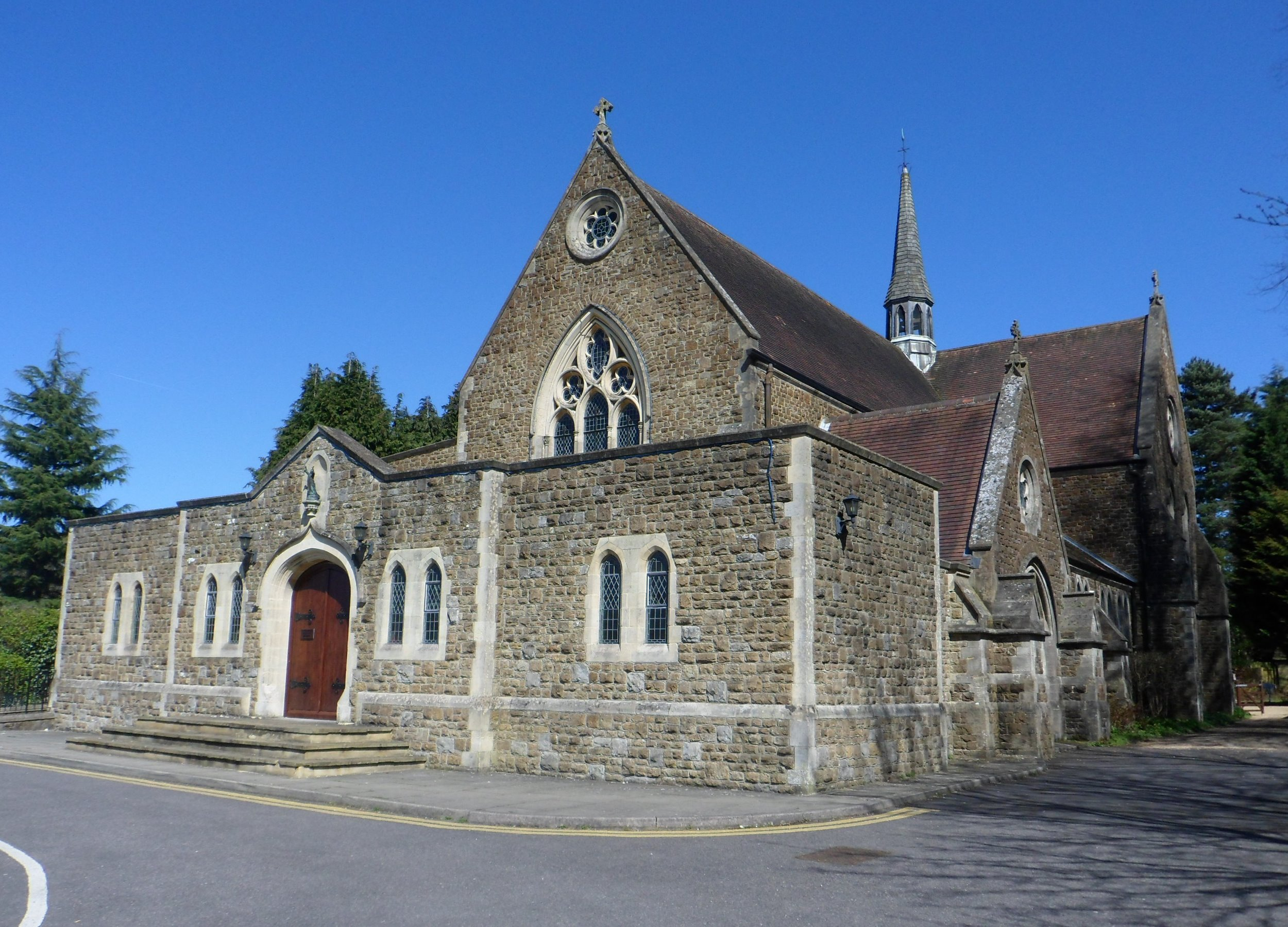
Church of the Sacred Heart, Caterham

- St James's Church, Icklingham, Suffolk (1865)
- Church of the Sacred Heart, Caterham (1881)
- St Joseph's Catholic Church, Guildford (1884; now demolished)
- Victoria Law Courts, Birmingham (1886, with Webb)
- Cromwell Road frontage for the Victoria and Albert Museum in South Kensington (1891, with Webb)
- Newfoundland Museum in St. John's (1892, with Webb)
- New Buildings of Christ's Hospital in Horsham, Sussex (1893 - 1902, with Webb)
- Royal United Services Institute, Whitehall, London (1893 - 1895, with Webb)
- Peninsula Barracks, Winchester, Hampshire (1897)
- St Andrew's Church, Fulham Fields, London (1895 - 1900, with Webb)
- Britannia Royal Naval College at Dartmouth (c.1900, with Webb)
- Imperial College of Science, South Kensington (1900-1906, with Webb)
- University of Birmingham (1900-1909, with Webb)
- Brompton Barracks Boer War Memorial Arch, Kent (1902)
- King's College, Cambridge (1908, with Webb)
- Gonville and Caius College, Cambridge
- Second Court (Bright's Building), Magdalene College, Cambridge (1908 - 1909, with Webb)
- Old Supreme Court Building, Hong Kong (1900–12, with Webb)
