= Mary Juliana Hardman =

English nun

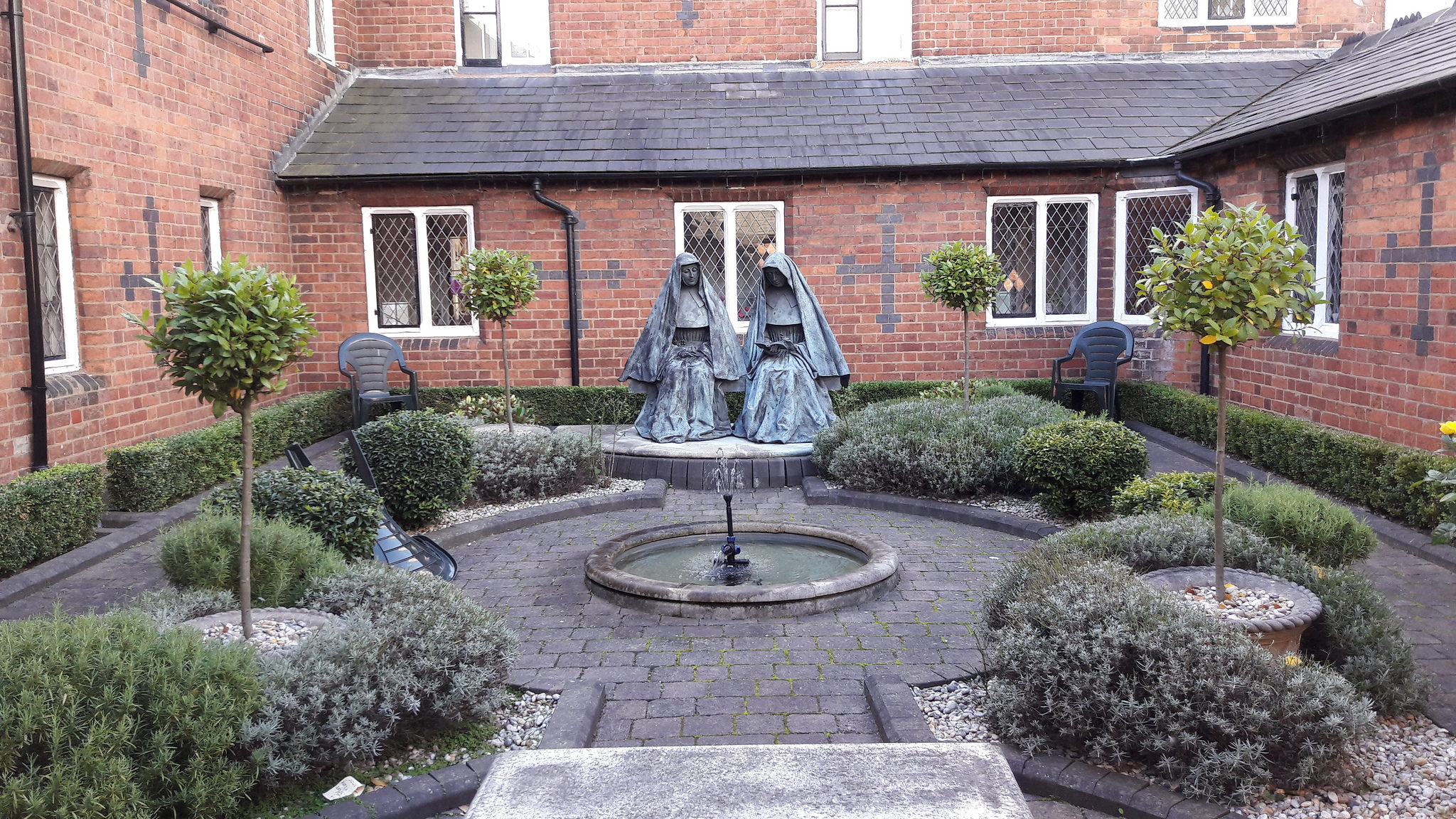
St Mary's Convent statues of Sisters of Mercy Catherine McAuley and Mary Juliana Hardman by Philip Jackson.

Mary Juliana Hardman (name in religion Sister Mary) (26 April 1813 – 24 March 1884) was an English nun.

== Life ==
Mary Juliana was one of a large recusant family, the Hardmans. Her father was John Hardman, senior, of Birmingham, a rich manufacturer, her mother his second wife, Lydia Waring.

She was educated in the Benedictine convent at Caverswall, in Staffordshire, and, when she was nineteen, her father founded the convent of Our Lady of Mercy at Handsworth, near Birmingham. In 1840 Miss Hardman and three friends offered themselves to Bishop Walsh, to form the nucleus of a new community, and by his advice they went to make their novitiate under Mother Catherine McAuley, founder of the Institute of the Sisters of Mercy, Baggot Street, Dublin.

The novices made their profession on 19 August 1841, and a day or two later Mother McAuley accompanied them to the new convent at Handsworth, where they were solemnly received by Bishop Nicholas Wiseman. Shortly afterwards Sister Mary Juliana was appointed first prioress of the community, and held that office off and on for thirty-five years, her first appointment lasting for six. She was then elected for three years, and twice re-elected for the same period, and from 1870 she held the office of superioress till her death.

In 1849 she opened another convent at St. Chad's, Birmingham, and also one at Wolverhampton. The next year she built an almonry for the relief of the poor, and opened poor-schools. In 1851 she placed the orphanage founded by her father at Maryvale under the care of Sisters of her community, making her own sister, Mary Hardman, in religion Sister Mary of the Holy Ghost, superioress. In 1858 she built a middle-class boarding-school; twelve years later she erected elementary schools for the working classes at Handsworth; and in 1874 she opened a middle-class day-school for both of boys and girls. She died at Handsworth, at the age of seventy.

Her brother, John Hardman, founded in 1844 Hardman & Co., the ecclesiastical metal works and stained glass works at Birmingham.
