= Atlantic Hockey America men's Individual Sportsmanship Award =

Atlantic Hockey America Individual Sportsmanship Award
- Sport: Ice hockey
- Awarded for: The player best exemplifying the qualities of sportsmanship in Atlantic Hockey America

History
- First award: 2025
- Most recent: Mack Oliphant

The Atlantic Hockey America Individual Sportsmanship Award is an annual award given out at the conclusion of the Atlantic Hockey America regular season to the player best exemplifying the qualities of sportsmanship in the conference.

The Individual Sportsmanship Award was first awarded in 2025 and is a successor to the Atlantic Hockey Individual Sportsmanship Award, which was discontinued after the conference merged with the women-only College Hockey America.

== Award winners ==
Year	Winner	Position	School	Ref
2024–25	Mac Gadowsky	Defenseman	Army	
2025–26	Mack Oliphant	Defenseman	Holy Cross	

=== Winners by school ===
School	Winners
Army	1
Holy Cross	1

=== Winners by position ===
Position	Winners
Defenseman	2

== See also ==
- Atlantic Hockey Individual Sportsmanship Award
