= Pippet family of Solihull =

Family

The Pippet family are a family of designers and artists based in Warwickshire and Birmingham, who specialised in Catholic decorative schemes for churches, ecclesiastical metalwork and stained glass windows as well as some textile items. They were part of the British Gothic Revival, notably working for John Hardman & Co in the style of Pugin.

== Joseph Aloysius Pippet ==
Born in Somerset in 1840 he was briefly educated at Downside Catholic school until his family moved to Leamington after his father was appointed land agent to the Throckmortons. As mentioned in his obituary, his father was a notable convert to Catholicism. Joseph was apprenticed at John Hardman and Co sometime in 1853, becoming a reliable designer and design practice co-ordinator. He designed the interior decoration for Pugin's All Saints' Church in Barton-upon-Irwell, Lancashire, as well as wall paintings for Shrewsbury Roman Catholic Cathedral, the latter of which had become hidden in twentieth century refurbishing but revealed in restoration work since 2019. He worked particularly closely with Pugin's apprentice and son-in-law J.H. Powell. In the 1860s he decorated St Peter's church, Hascombe. Other examples of his work are in: Holy Trinity Church, Winchester; Salford Cathedral; Church of the Sacred Heart, Caterham, Surrey.

He married Juliet Elizabeth Mary Canning of Handsworth, Birmingham in 1865 and had sixteen children. Juliet managed her husband's accounts, writing letters concerning wages and more personal problems to J.H. Powell of Hardman and Co on behalf of Joseph. She was also an exceptional embroiderer, as were two of her daughters. Out of seven daughters four became nuns, one of whom became the Abbess at Teignmouth. He died in September 1903 at his house in Solihull from pneumonia. There was a solemn requiem held at St Augustine of England Church, Solihull, the family church with many artistic contributions by his family; his funeral took place at Baddesley Clinton.

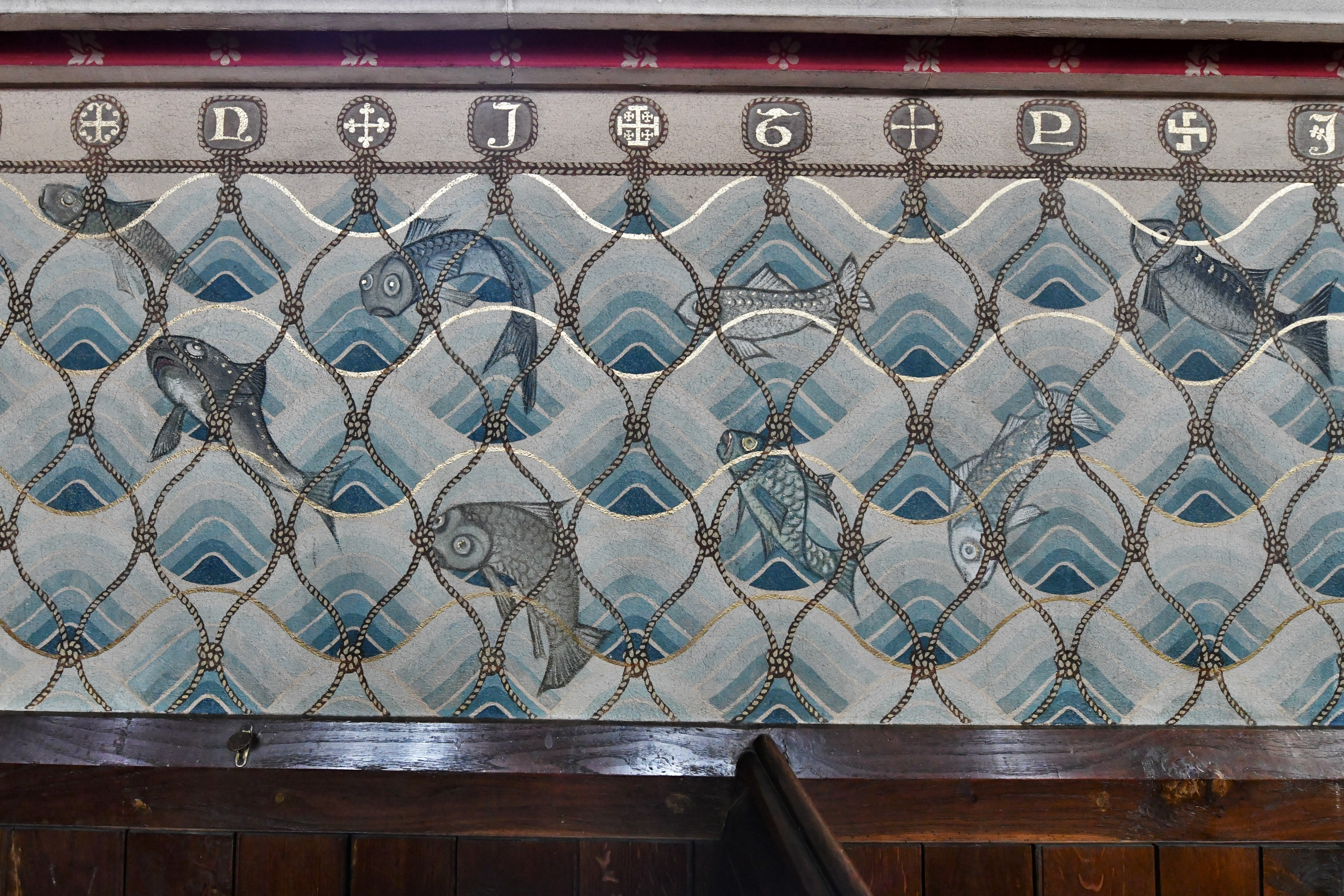
The nave, St. Peter's Church, Hascombe

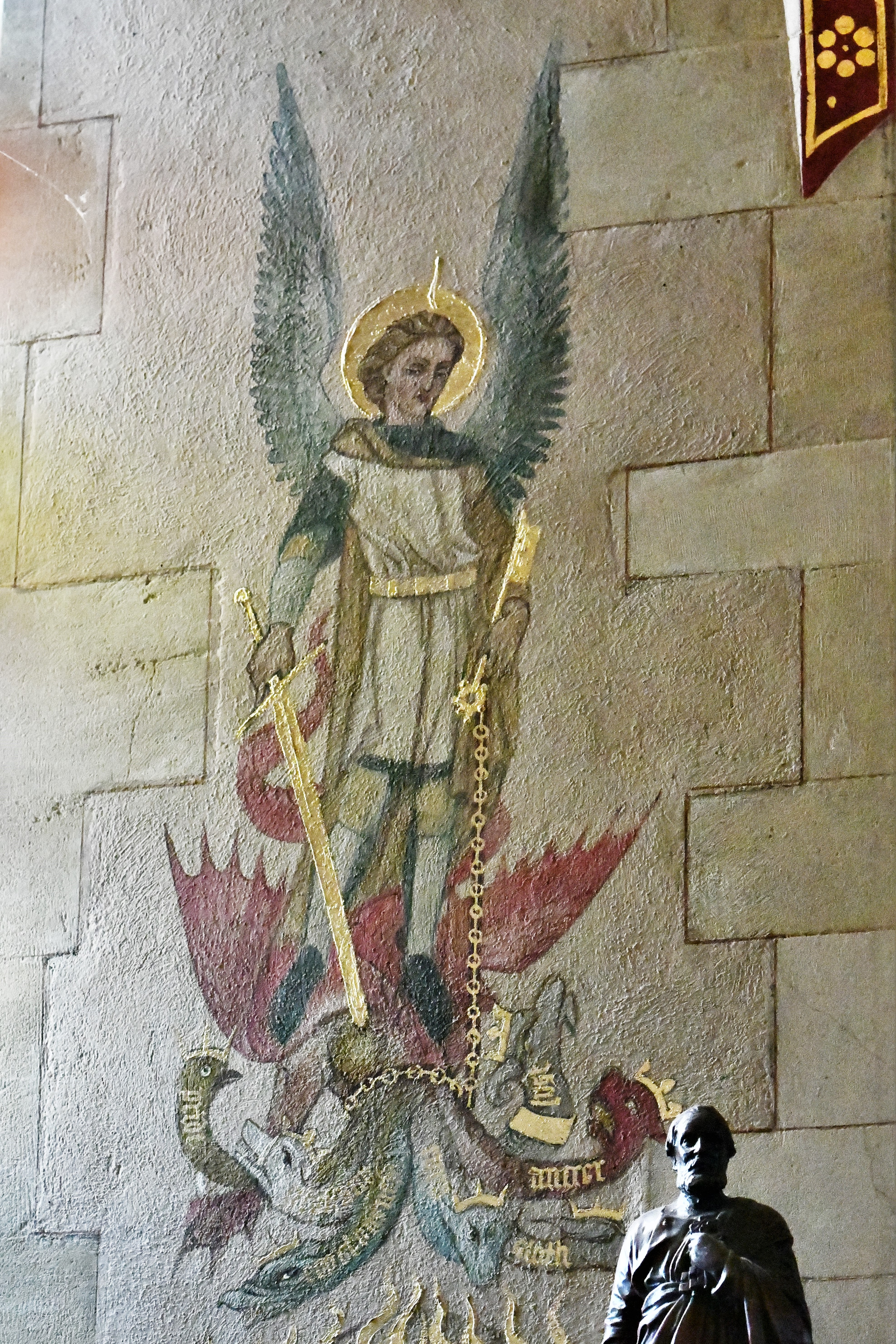
St. Peter's Church, Painted window arches

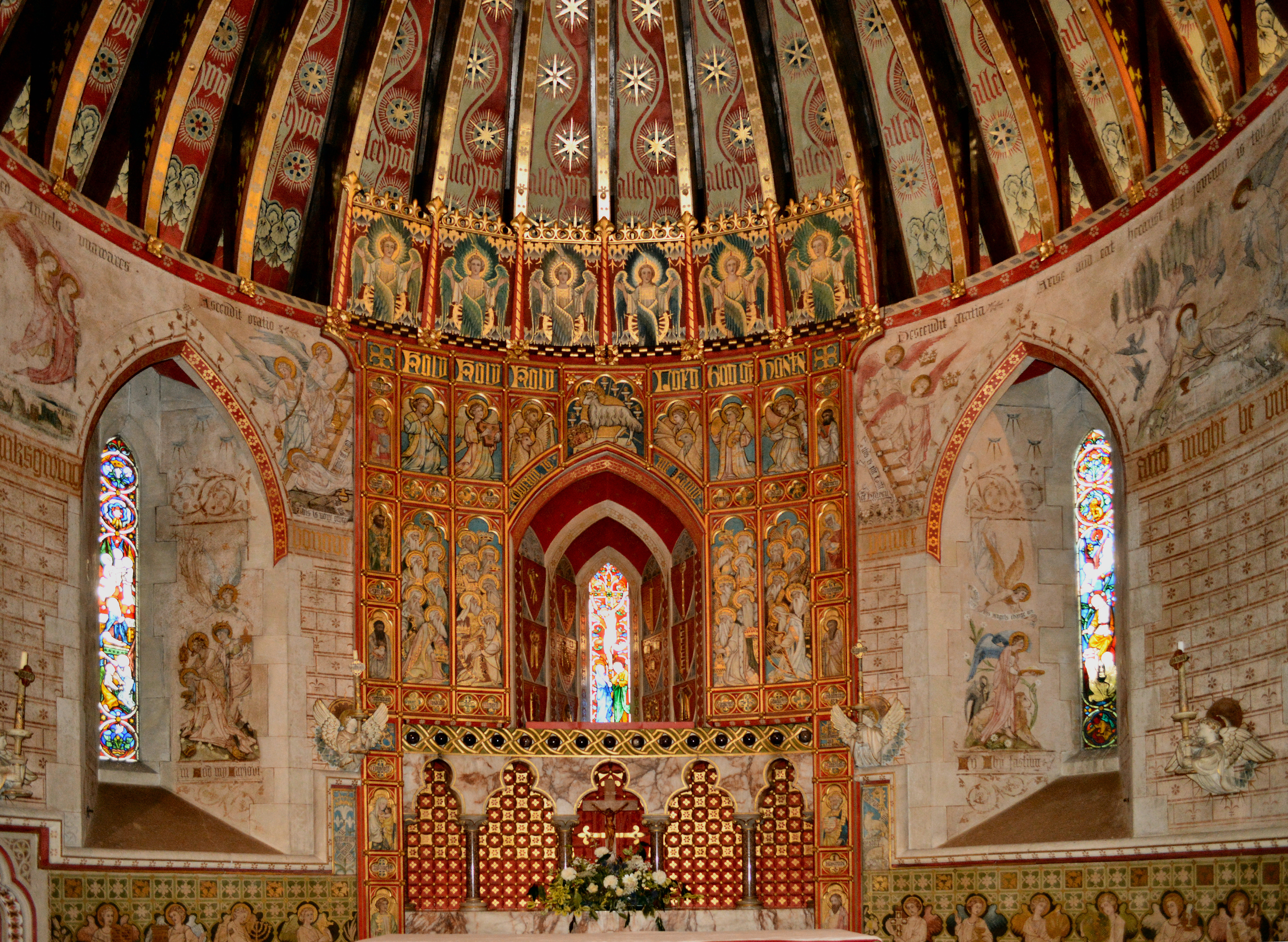
St. Peter's Church, sanctuary

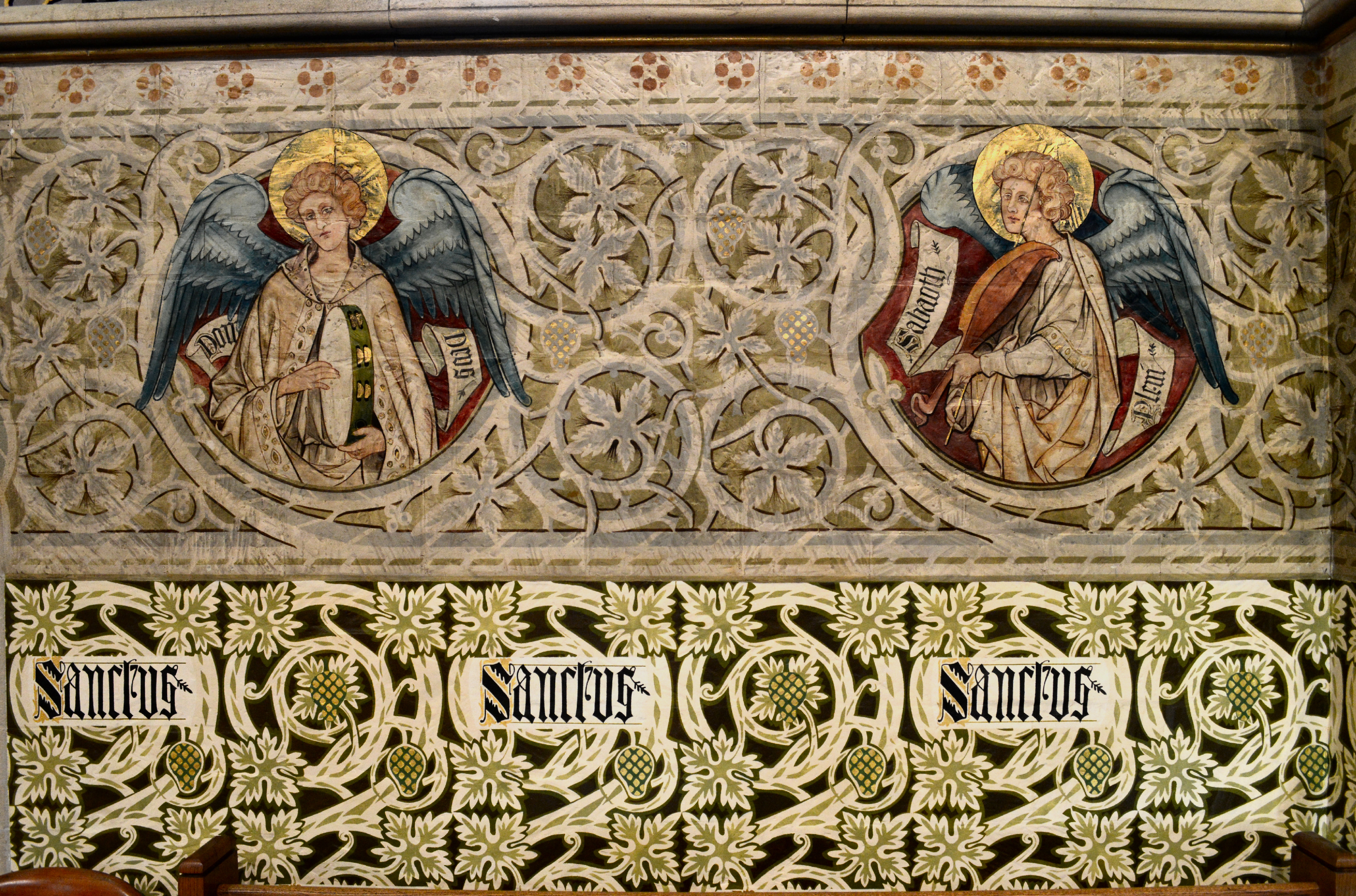
Sacred Heart Church, Caterham

== Elphege and Oswald Pippet ==
Elphege Joseph, born 1868, and Oswald Cody, 1869, and to a lesser extent their younger brother Wilfred, 1873, all worked for Hardman and Co. Later, Elphege and Oswald became independent subcontractors and designed many buildings for the company well into the 1930s.

Some of their designs include:

- Chancel Decoration, Church of Our Lady, Ilkeston
- Chapel Painting, St Anthony's Convent, Hull
- Decoration of the Sacred Heart Chapel, St Mary's, Chorley
- Decoration, Church of the Annunciation, Chesterfield
- Shrine Chapel Decoration, York Oratory
- Chapel Decoration, St Gregory's Convent, Cheltenham
- Lady Chapel Decoration, St Catherine's, Birmingham
- Decoration of Seminary Lady Chapel, St Cuthbert's College, Ushaw
- English Martyrs' Chapel, Nottingham Cathedral
- Interior Decorations of Sacred Heart Chapel, Sanctuary and Holy Family Chapel, Nazareth House, Hammersmith
- Decoration of Oratory, Convent of the Sisters, Bristol
- Sanctuary Decoration, St Joseph's, Richmond
- High Altar, St Wilfrid's, Cotton
- Sanctuary Ceiling, St Scholastica's Abbey, Teignmouth
- Blessed Sacrament Chapel, St Barnabas' Cathedral, Nottingham

== Gabriel Pippet ==
Born 1880, Gabriel Joseph Pippet became a renowned designer of mosaic and opus sectile. His finest work can be seen at the Church of the Sacred Heart, Droitwich. He also designed a set of Stations of the Cross for Corpus Christi Church, Baltimore, USA between 1896 and 1914. He taught art at Achimoto College, Gold Coast (now Ghana). Two 'lost' murals were restored in 2024 at the Oxford Oratory Church of St Aloysius Gonzaga by Cliveden Conservation.
