= Blofield =

Village in Norfolk, England

Coordinates: 52.635°N 1.448°E

- Village
- Location within Norfolk
- Area: 9.41 km^{2} (3.63 sq mi)
- Population: 4,087 (Census 2021)
  - Density: 434/km^{2} (1,120/sq mi)
- OS grid reference: TG333097
- Civil parish: Blofield
- District: Broadland
- Shire county: Norfolk
- Region: East
- Country: England
- Sovereign state: United Kingdom
- Post town: NORWICH
- Postcode district: NR13
- Dialling code: 01603
- Police: Norfolk
- Fire: Norfolk
- Ambulance: East of England
- UK Parliament: Broadland and Fakenham

Blofield is a village and civil parish in the Broadland district of the English county of Norfolk. The parish includes the village of Blofield and the hamlets of Blofield Heath and Blofield Corner. It is 5 miles (8.0 km) miles east of Norwich and 14 miles (23 km) west of Great Yarmouth.

== History ==
Blofield is listed in the Domesday Book as a settlement of 61 households in the hundred of Blofield. In 1086, the village was divided between the estates of William, Bishop of Thetford and Ralph de Beaufour.

In the 18th-century, the parish was a centre for brick making and the manufacturing of tiles.

== Geography ==
Blofield is bordered by the River Bure to the north and the River Yare to the south. The A47 road between Birmingham and Lowestoft runs through the parish.

According to the 2021 census, Blofield parish has a total population of 4,087 people which demonstrates a steep increase from the 3,316 people listed in the 2011 census.

== Church of St. Andrew and St. Peter ==
Blofield's parish church is dedicated to Saint Andrew and Saint Peter, and was constructed in the 14th-century. The church has one of the largest towers in Norfolk and was significantly remodelled in the 19th and 20th centuries; despite this an ornate, carved font survives dating from the 15th century. There is a stained-glass memorial to Margaret Gordon Harker designed by Clayton and Bell with further designs by Hardman & Co., J. & J. King, Kempe & Co. and Ward and Hughes. The Church of St. Andrew and St. Peter has been Grade I listed since 1962.

== Amenities ==
Village amenities include the Kings Head public house, Blofield County Primary School, a doctors' surgery, library, scout hut, newsagent, post office/convenience store, fish and chip shop, florist, hairdresser, an outdoor leisure and camping store, a farm shop and a solicitor's office. Two halls provide facilities for meetings, including for the Women's Institute which was formed in 1918 and claims to be the oldest in Norfolk.

The village has a tennis club founded in May 1924, with grass and hard courts. It also have two non-league football clubs, Norwich United, who play in the Anglian Combination Premier Division, and Blofield United, who play in the Anglian Combination First Division.

== Transport ==
Blofield is served by buses to Brundall, Norwich, Wymondham and Silfield. The nearest railway stations are Brundall and Brundall Gardens, both located approximately a mile away; there are regular services to Great Yarmouth, Lowestoft and Norwich, which are operated by Greater Anglia.

== Notable people ==
- Sir Arthur Borton – Governor of Malta 1878–1884 was born in Blofield in 1814.
- Darren Eadie – former football player who played for Norwich City and Leicester City.
- John Edrich – England Test cricketer from 1963 to 1976, was born in Blofield in 1937.
- John Emms- (1844–1912), English artist born in Blofield
- Ken Brown – Norwich City manager from 1980 to 1987.
- Robert McKelvie- (1912–1996), English cricketer, born in Blofield.
- George Tuck- (1843–1920), English cricketer and lawyer, lived in Blofield
- Roland Robertson- (1938–2022), Anglo-American sociologist, born in Blofield

== Governance ==
Blofield is part of the electoral ward of Blofield with South Walsham for local elections and is part of the district of Broadland. It forms part of the Broadland and Fakenham parliamentary constituency.
