= Atlantic Hockey America men's Best Defenseman =

Atlantic Hockey America Best Defenseman
- Sport: Ice hockey
- Awarded for: The Best Defenseman in Atlantic Hockey America

History
- First award: 2025
- Most recent: Chris Hedden

The Atlantic Hockey America Best Defenseman is an annual award given out at the conclusion of the Atlantic Hockey America regular season to the best defenseman in the conference.

The Best Defenseman Award was first awarded in 2025, and is a successor to the Atlantic Hockey Best Defenseman, which was discontinued after the conference merged with the women-only College Hockey America.

== Award winners ==
Year	Winner	School	Ref
2024–25	Mac Gadowsky	Army	
2025–26	Chris Hedden	Air Force	

=== Winners by school ===
School	Winners
Air Force	1
Army	1

== See also ==
- Atlantic Hockey Best Defenseman
