= Blofield Heath =

Hamlet in Norfolk, England

Coordinates: 52.651865°N 1.4400526°E

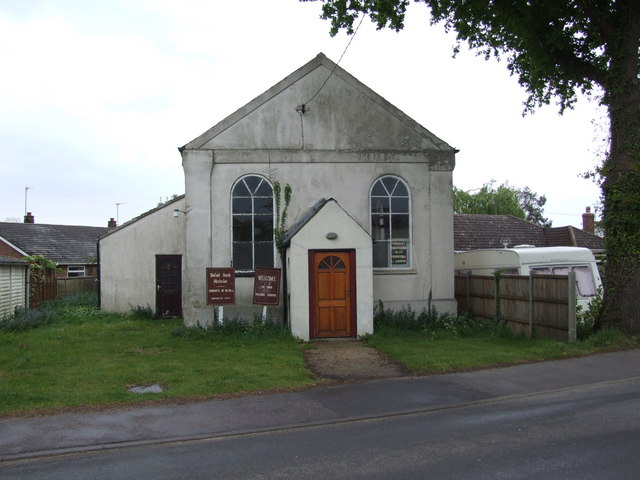

- Location within Norfolk
- Area: 0.7750 km^{2} (0.2992 sq mi)
- Population: 1,488 (2020 estimate)
  - Density: 1,920/km^{2} (5,000/sq mi)
- Civil parish: Blofield
- District: Broadland
- Shire county: Norfolk
- Region: East
- Country: England
- Sovereign state: United Kingdom
- Post town: NORWICH
- Postcode district: NR13
- Dialling code: 01603
- Police: Norfolk
- Fire: Norfolk
- Ambulance: East of England

Blofield Heath is a hamlet in the civil parish of Blofield, in the Broadland district of Norfolk, England. It is about 7 miles from Norwich. In 2020 it had an estimated population of 1488. Blofield Heath has a post office and it formerly had a primitive Methodist Chapel. Blofield Heath is separated from Blofield village by the A47.
