= Robert McKelvie =

English cricketer

Personal information
- Full name: Robert Douglas McKelvie
- Born: 1 December 1912; Blofield, Norfolk, England
- Died: 5 January 1996 (aged 83); Banbury, Oxfordshire, England
- Batting: Right-handed
- Role: Occasional wicket-keeper

Domestic team information
- Years: Team
- 1948: Free Foresters
- 1947: Buckinghamshire

Career statistics
Competition	First-class
Matches	1
Runs scored	22
Batting average	11.00
100s/50s	0/0
Top score	12
Catches/stumpings	1/0
- Source: Cricinfo, 11 May 2011

Robert Douglas McKelvie (1 July 1912 – 5 January 1996) was an English cricketer. Mckelvie was a right-handed batsman who occasionally fielded as a wicket-keeper. He was born in Blofield, Norfolk and educated at Malvern College, where he represented the college cricket team.

McKelvie made a single appearance for Buckinghamshire in the 1947 Minor Counties Championship against Hertfordshire. During the following season, he made his only first-class appearance for the Free Foresters against Cambridge University. He scored 10 runs in the Free Foresters first-innings, before being dismissed by Trevor Bailey. In their second-innings he scored 12 runs before being dismissed by Hugh Griffiths.

He died in Banbury, Oxfordshire on 5 January 1996.
