= Zach McKelvie =

American ice hockey player

Current position
- Title: Head coach
- Team: Army
- Conference: AHA

Biographical details
- Born: February 22, 1985 (age 41); New Brighton, Minnesota, U.S.

Playing career
- 2005–2009: Army
- 2011–2012: Providence Bruins
- 2011–2012: Reading Royals
- 2012–2014: Abbotsford Heat
- 2013–2014: Alaska Aces
- Position: Defense

Coaching career (HC unless noted)
- 2014–2016: Army (asst.)
- 2016–2025: Army (asoc.)
- 2025–present: Army

Head coaching record
- Overall: 12–17–6 (.429)

Zach McKelvie (born February 22, 1985) is an American former ice hockey player, and current head coach of the Army Black Knights men's ice hockey team.

== Playing career ==
McKelvie played college ice hockey at Army from 2005 to 2009. During the 2007–08 season, in his junior year, he served as an assistant captain and recorded four goals and 13 assists in 35 games. Following the season he was named the Atlantic Hockey Best Defenseman, and named to the All-Atlantic Hockey First Team. During the 2008–09 season, in his senior year, he served as captain and recorded five goals and 12 assists in 33 games. Following the season he was named to the All-Atlantic Hockey First Team for the second consecutive year, becoming the only player in program history to earn All-Atlantic Hockey First Team honors on multiple occasions. In 2023, in honor of its 20th anniversary, the conference selected the top 20 players from its history, and he was inducted into the Atlantic Hockey Hall of Honor.

Following his collegiate career, he joined the Providence Bruins during the 2011–2012 season, where he recorded one goal and one assist in 39 games. He then joined the Reading Royals of the ECHL for the remainder of the 2011–2012 season, and recorded one goal in seven games. He then spent two seasons with the Abbotsford Heat and recorded three assists in 65 games. During the 2013–2014 season, he recorded three goals and one assist in 22 games, and helped lead the Alaska Aces to the Kelly Cup.

== Coaching career ==
McKelvie began his coaching career as an assistant coach at his Alma Mater Army. On July 27, 2016, he was promoted to associate head coach. On August 21, 2024, longtime head coach Brian Riley announced he would retire following the 2024–25 season. McKelvie was named head coach in waiting, bringing a 75-year run of Riley's behind the Black Knights' bench to a close.

== Personal life ==
McKelvie's twin brother, Chris, is a former professional ice hockey player.

== Head coaching record ==
=== College ===
Record table
| Season | Team | Overall | Conference | Standing | Postseason |
|---|---|---|---|---|---|
Army Black Knights (AHA) (2025–present)
| 2025–26 | Army | 12–17–6 | 7–15–4 | 9th | AHA First Round |
| Army: | | 12–17–6 | 7–15–4 | | |
| Total: | | 12–17–6 | | | |
National champion Postseason invitational champion Conference regular season champion Conference regular season and conference tournament champion Division regular season champion Division regular season and conference tournament champion Conference tournament champion
