= Hardman & Co. =

Stained glass and ecclesiastical fittings manufacturer

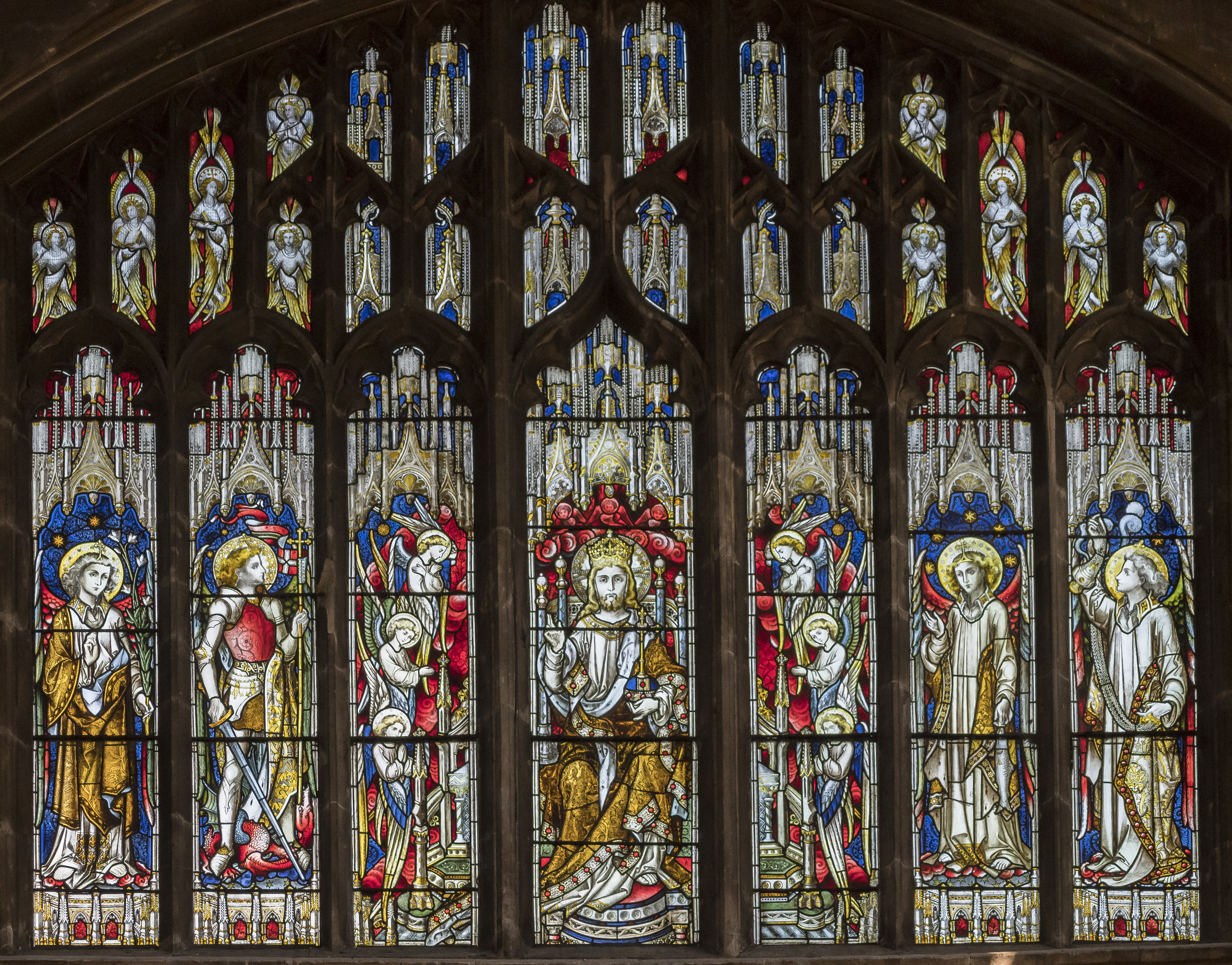
Stained-glass window by Hardman & Co., St. John the Baptist Church, Cirencester

Hardman & Co., or John Hardman Trading Co., Ltd., was a British manufacturer of stained glass and ecclesiastical fittings. Founded in 1838, it began manufacturing stained glass in 1844, and was one of the world's leading stained glass manufacturers until its closure in 2008.

== History ==
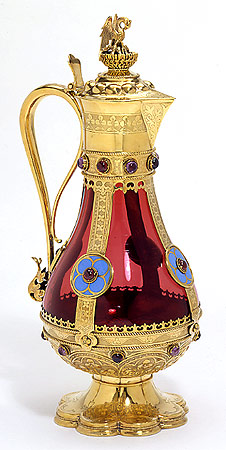
Flagon, ruby glass, silver-gilt mounts, stones and enamels, 1858–9, John Hardman Powell, V&A Museum no. M.39-1972

In the 1830s, Augustus Welby Pugin was commissioned by Roman Catholic Bishop Thomas Walsh to design a suitable church to house the remains of St. Chad, which had been rescued from destruction at Lichfield Cathedral during the Reformation. When the building was consecrated in 1841 as Saint Chad's Cathedral, it was the first Roman Catholic cathedral to be built in England since the Reformation. For Pugin, a recently converted Catholic, the commission was of great importance.

Pugin first had contact with the Hardmans during the construction of St. Chad's Chapel, the forerunner to the cathedral scheme. John Hardman (1766–1844), of Handsworth, then in Staffordshire, England (and now part of Birmingham), was the head of a family business designing and manufacturing metalwork. He was described as the "opulent button maker and medallist." John Hardman Jr. (1812–67) left the family business in 1838 and set up on his own to manufacture ecclesiastical metalwork. Pugin employed Hardman's to provide metalwork for St. Chad's Cathedral. Hardman was an enthusiastic donor, giving the rood screen to the cathedral, and was recognised for his provision to various charities by the gift of the Hardman Chantry, in which John Hardman Sr. was interred in 1844 and remained the family burial place.

From 1845, at the urging of Pugin, John Hardman Jr. entered the burgeoning industry of stained glass manufacture. He was joined by his nephew, John Hardman Powell (1827–95) who married Pugin's daughter Anne in 1850 and claimed to be Pugin's only pupil. Powell became the chief designer from about 1849, prior to Pugin's death in 1852. The company took part in the Great Exhibition of 1851 in London, exhibiting the great chandelier designed for Alton Towers.

Hardman and Powell collaborated with A.W. Pugin's son, E.W. Pugin, firstly in the design of the funeral arrangements of John Talbot, 16th Earl of Shrewsbury in November 1852. The collaboration between the Hardman firm and the Pugins was to continue after E.W. Pugin's death in 1875 with the later firm, Pugin & Pugin. This collaboration lasted for three generations and was a major influence on Catholic church architecture and decoration in particular and the Gothic Revival in general.

Under the management of J.H. Powell, the metalwork design department split from the stained glass department in 1883 and traded under the name Hardman, Powell and Co. Powell died in 1895, passing the leadership of the firm to John Bernard Hardman, the grandson of John Hardman Sr., who headed the company until 1903 and took the firm to the Exposition Universelle, Paris. The firm continued producing stained glass under directorship of Donald Taunton and Patrick A. Feeny until the 1970s, and had premises at 26 Frederick Street in the Jewellery Quarter, Birmingham, Newhall Hill and Lightwoods House. A large proportion of the Hardman archive, particularly their Medieval Room, was damaged and destroyed in a fire at the Newhall Hill studio in 1970; some of the earliest and most damaged cartoons are now held in temperature controlled storage at Birmingham Museum and Art Gallery. Hardman acquired the stained glass manufacturer Goddard & Gibbs in 2006; two years later, in 2008, the Hardman business closed.

== Design ==
=== Gothic Revival ===
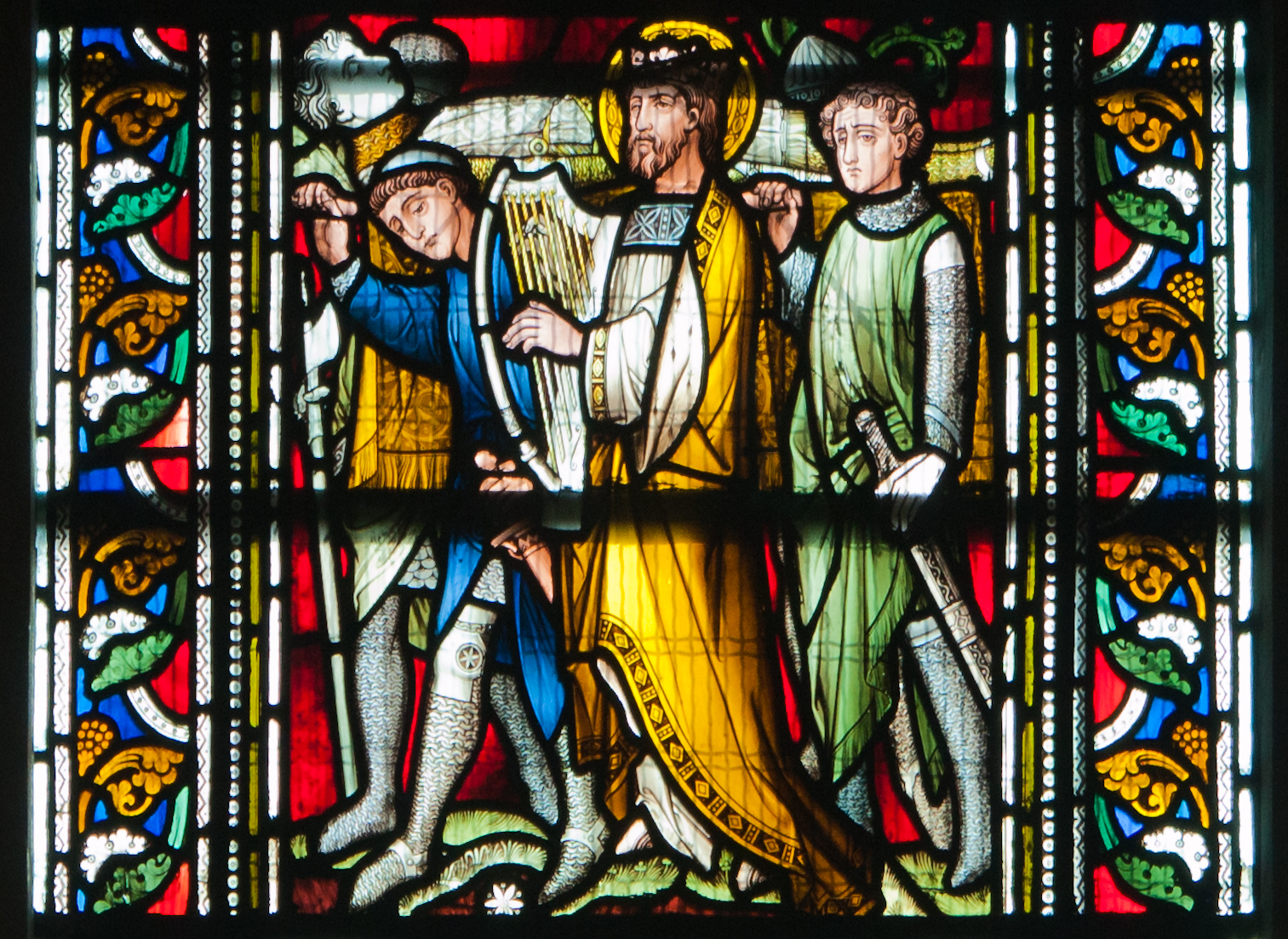
David and Jubal from Christ Church Cathedral, Dublin

Through the influence of A.W. Pugin, John Ruskin, and the Oxford Movement, it was considered during the mid-19th century that the only appropriate style in which a church should be built was Gothic. This fashion was combined with a general renewal within the church and a growth of Roman Catholicism. The result was that many designers in different fields tried to imitate the Medieval style in their work. This was particularly the case in the stained glass industry.

Pugin, who supplied the first designs for Hardmans, was thoroughly absorbed in the Medieval and was a designer of the highest order. He produced designs of every description- churches, windows, furniture, vestments, vessels, tiles, jewellery and, for the interiors of the Houses of Parliament, Gothic thrones, Gothic hat-stands and Gothic ashtrays. With his busy regime, he increasingly relied upon his talented son-in-law, Powell, to provide the designs for stained glass.

The firm had many subcontractors and designers who are not well-known but produced exceptional work under the Hardman name, such as the Pippet family of Solihull, William John Wainwright, and R.J. Hopkins.

=== John Hardman Powell ===
Powell's stained glass recreates the elegance, refinement, and brevity that is seen in some of the finest examples of glass, sculpture, and illumination of the 13th and 14th centuries. He utilised flowing, curving lines, the flourish of drapery, calligraphic brushstrokes, and pure colour. However, Powell's work was not, like many stained glass designers, merely imitative. His designs are original innovations in the Gothic style. The quality of Hardman's church windows, particularly in the 1850s and 1860s, was superb.

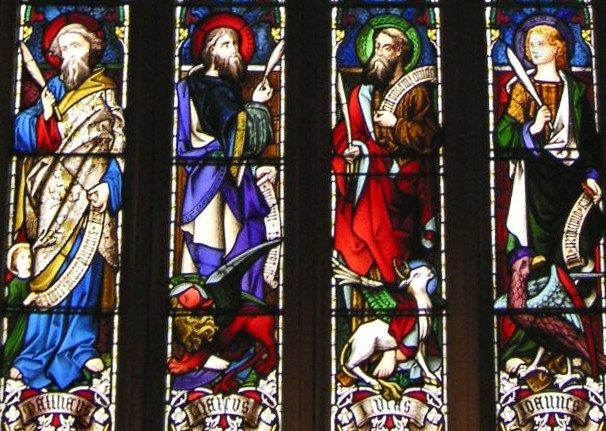
The Gospel writers, Matthew, Mark, Luke and John from St Andrew's Cathedral, Sydney

=== Major commissions ===
The most famous building that the Hardmans made glass for was the new Houses of Parliament in London, for which Pugin was the interior designer. Pugin employed the Scottish firm of Ballantine and Allen to manufacture the windows that he designed for the House of Lords, but all the rest were made by Hardmans, who have maintained their relationship with that building, repairing and replacing glass damaged or destroyed during World War II.

Apart from the windows created for Pugin's churches in England and Ireland, two of Hardman's major commissions were to come from Australia. In the 1860s the architect Edmund Blacket commissioned Hardmans to supply 27 windows, including a 6-light West window and a 7-light East window for St. Andrew's Cathedral, Sydney. They were installed for the consecration in 1868.

In the 1880s William Wardell selected the same firm to provide windows for St. Mary's R.C. Cathedral in the same city. This building, of which the nave was not completed until the 1930s, is very much larger than St Andrew's and has three large rose windows and an enormous East window, the tracery of which was based directly on that of Lincoln Cathedral, c.1280. The design of this huge window, depicting the Coronation of the Blessed Virgin Mary is one of the pinnacles of achievement in Gothic Revival stained glass.

== Buildings with glass by Hardmans ==
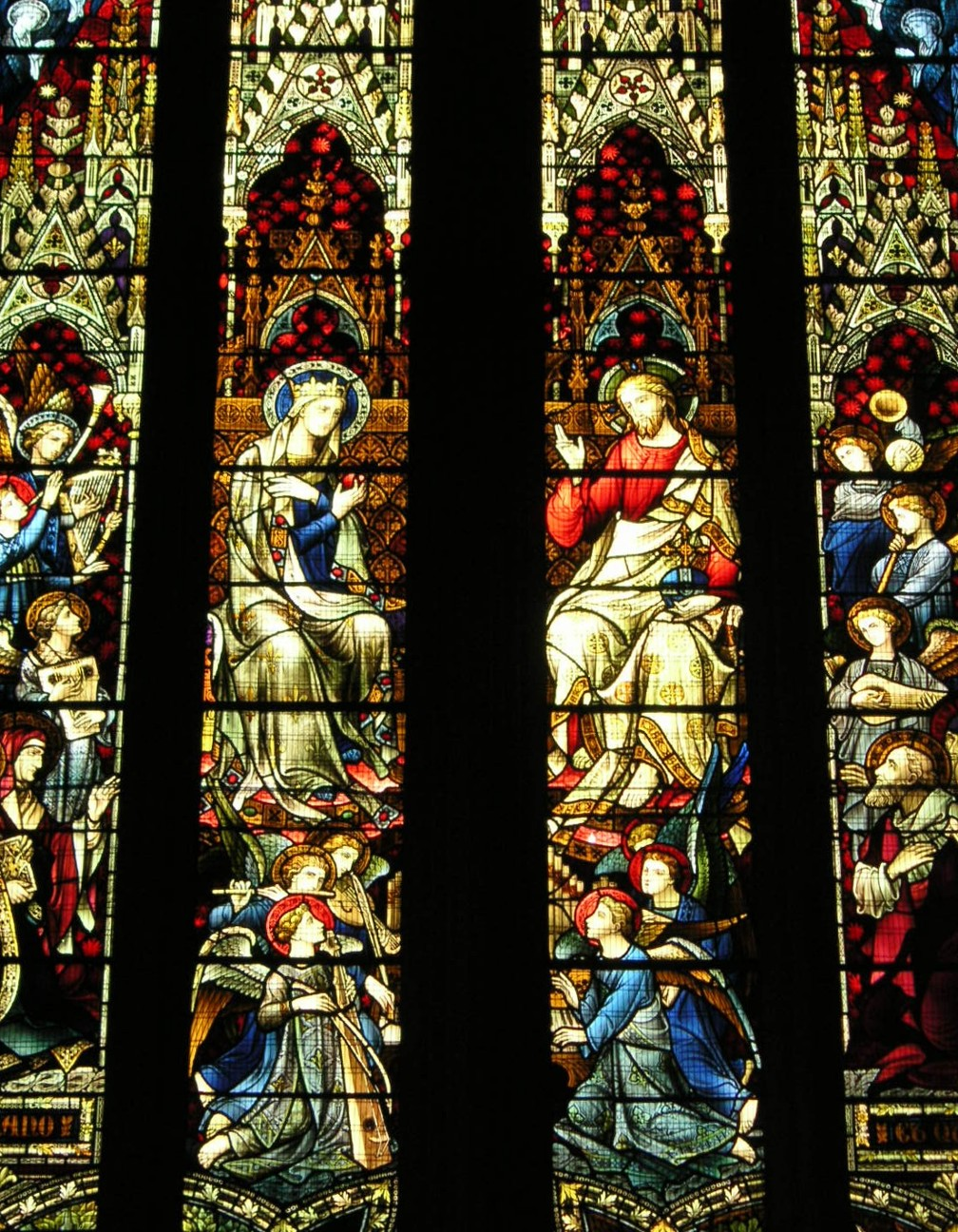
The Coronation of the Blessed Virgin from the east window of St Mary's Cathedral, Sydney

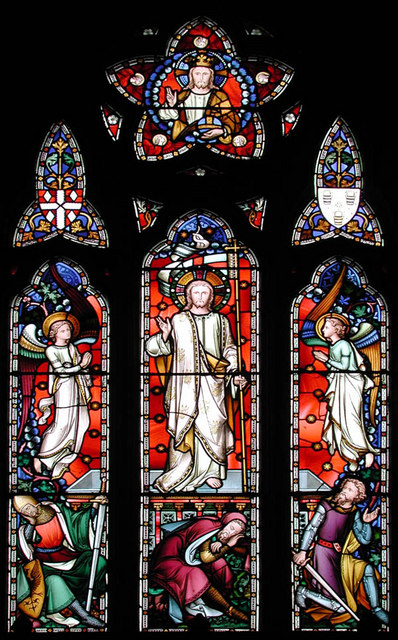
The Risen Christ from St Catherine's Church, Kingsdown, Kent

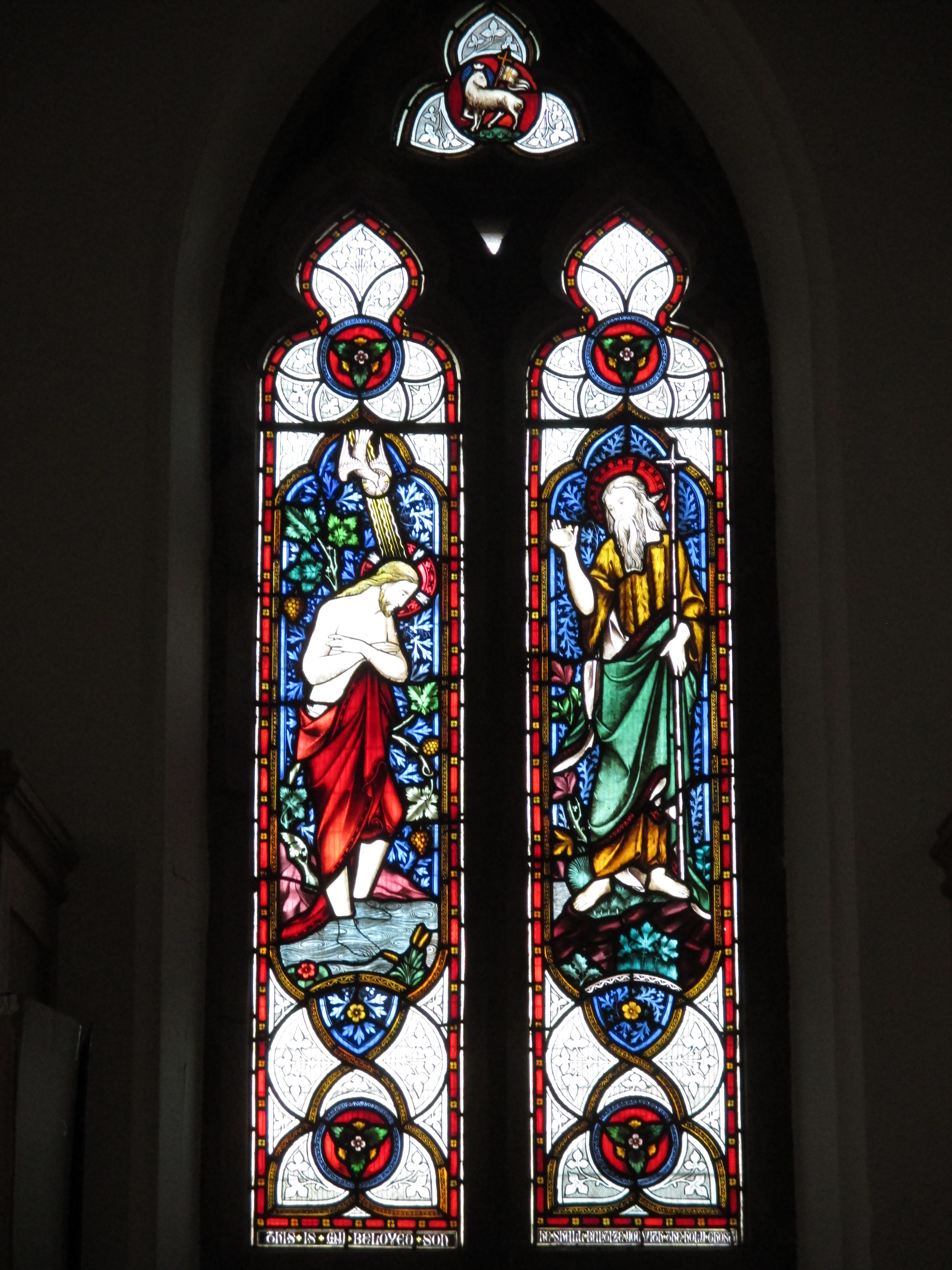
Our Lord's Baptism by John the Baptist, from Holy Trinity Church, Hurstpierpoint

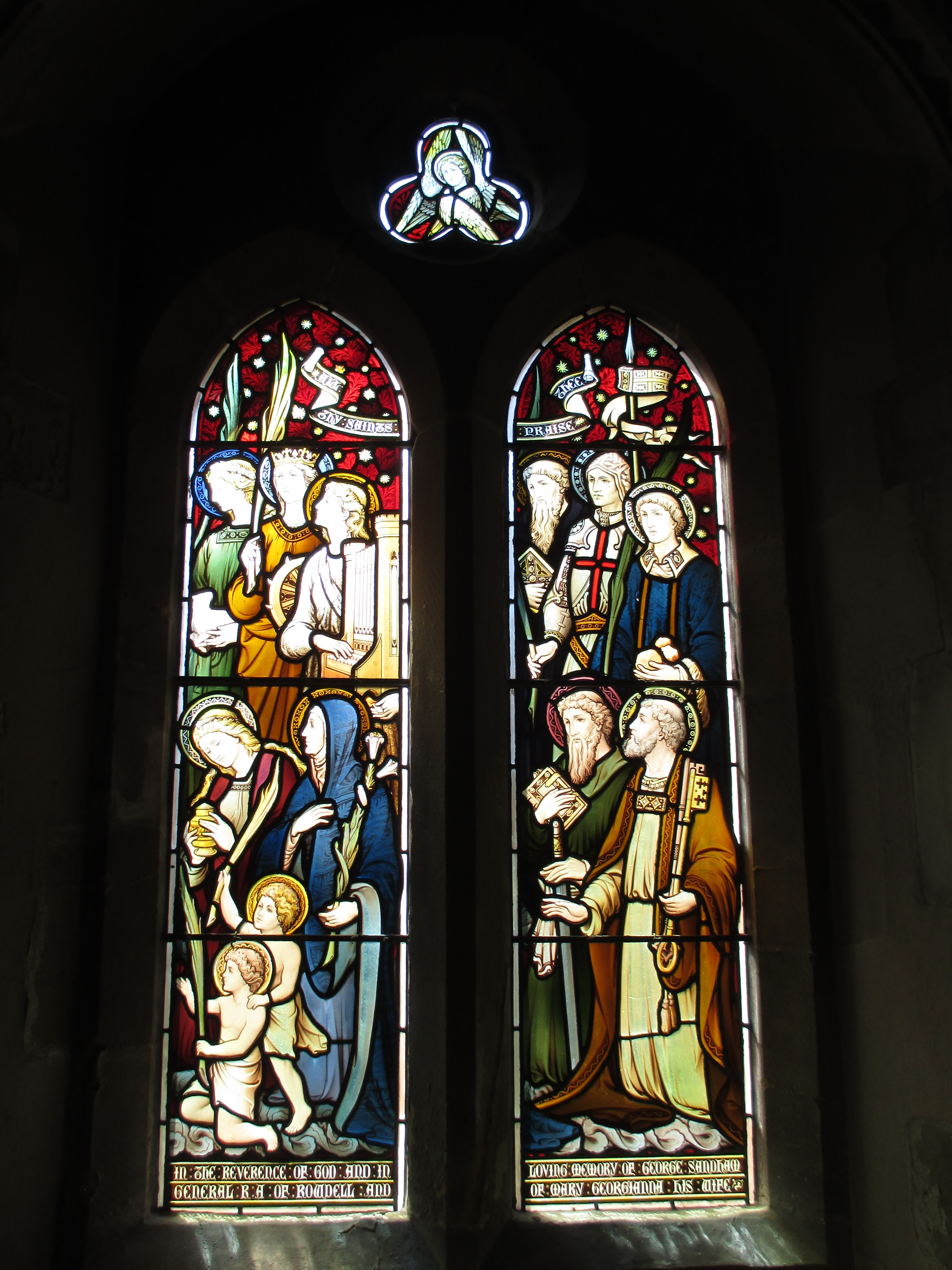
Saints of Praise, St Mary's Church, Washington, West Sussex

England

- Bristol
  - St. Paul's Church, Clifton, Bristol
- Berkshire
  - Sandhurst Royal Memorial Chapel, Sandhurst, Berkshire
  - St. Michael and All Angels Church, Sandhurst, Berkshire
  - St. Nicholas' Church, Newbury, Berkshire
  - St. Paul's Church, Wokingham, Berkshire
- Cambridgeshire
  - St. Mary's Church, St Neots, Cambridgeshire
- Cumbria
  - Our Lady and St. Wilfrid's Church, Warwick Bridge, Cumbria
- Devon
  - Holy Trinity Church, Ilfracombe, Devon
  - St. Hieritha's Church, Chittlehampton, Devon
  - St. Peter-in-Chains, Rose Ash, Devon
  - Wynard's Chapel, Exeter, Devon
- Gloucestershire
  - Gloucester Cathedral, Gloucester, Gloucestershire
  - St. John Baptist Church, Cirencester, Gloucestershire
  - St. Peter's Church, Gloucester, Gloucestershire
  - Tewkesbury Abbey, Tewkesbury, Gloucestershire
- Hampshire
  - The Great Hall at Winchester
- Herefordshire
  - St. Michael the Archangel's Church, Felton, Herefordshire
- Kent
  - St. Catherine's Church, Kingsdown, Kent
  - St. Margaret's Church, Halstead, Kent
- Lancashire
  - Our Lady and St. Hubert's Catholic Church, Great Harwood, Lancashire
- Lincolnshire
  - St. Nicholas' Church, Lincoln, Lincolnshire
  - St. Peter and St. Paul's Church, Algakirk, Lincolnshire
- London
  - Our Ladye Star of the Sea Church, Greenwich, London
  - St. Michael and All Angels Church, Palmerston Road, Walthamstow E17.
  - St Peter's Roman Catholic Church, Woolwich, London
- Manchester
  - St. James' Church, Heywood, Greater Manchester
- Norfolk
  - All Saints' Church, Dickleburgh, Norfolk
  - St. Andrew's Church, Blickling, Norfolk
  - St. Andrew's Church, Framingham Pigot, Norfolk
  - St. Andrew and St. Peter, Blofield, Norfolk
  - St John the Baptist Cathedral, Norwich, Norfolk
  - St. Margaret's Church, Clenchwarton, Norfolk
  - St. Mary's Church, Hillington, Norfolk
  - St. Michael and All Angels' Church, Bunwell, Norfolk
- Northamptonhire
  - Holy Cross Church, Byfield, Northamptonshire
- Oxfordshire
  - All Saints' Church, Dunsden Green, Oxfordshire
  - St Lawrence's Church, North Hinksey, Oxfordshire
- Staffordshire
  - St. Michael and St. James' Church, Haunton, Staffordshire
- Suffolk, East
  - St. Edmund's Church, Bungay, Suffolk
- Surrey
  - Cranleigh School Chapel, Cranleigh, Surrey
  - St. Nicolas Church, Cranleigh, Surrey
- Sussex, East
  - St Mary Magdalen's Church, Brighton, East Sussex
- Sussex, West
  - Arundel Castle, Arundel, West Sussex
  - Arundel Cathedral, Arundel, West Sussex
- Warwickshire
  - All Saints Church, Ladbroke, Warwickshire
  - St. Augustine's Church, Edgbaston, Warwickshire
  - St. Augustine of England Church, Solihull, Warwickshire
  - St. Chad's Cathedral, Birmingham, Warwickshire
  - St. Cyprian's Church, Hay Mills, Warwickshire
  - St. Joseph's Roman Catholic Church, Avon Dassett, Warwickshire
  - St. Laurence's Church, Northfield, Warwickshire
  - St. Mary, Selly Oak, Warwickshire
  - St. Mary Magdalene's Church, Great Alne, Warwickshire
- West Midlands
  - St. Peter's Church, Walsall, West Midlands
- Worcestershire
  - Worcester Cathedral, Worcester, Worcestershire
- Yorkshire, North
  - St. Agatha's Church, Gilling West, North Yorkshire
  - St Mary and St. Romuald's Church, Yarm, North Yorkshire
- Yorkshire, South
  - St. Nicholas, High Bradfield, South Yorkshire
  - St. Peter-in-Chains, Doncaster, South Yorkshire
- Yorkshire, West
  - All Souls Church, Halifax, West Yorkshire
  - Meanwood Towers, Meanwood, West Yorkshire

Northern Ireland

- St. Patrick and St. Colman's Cathedral, Newry, County Armagh

Scotland

- St. Patrick's Church, Anderston, Lanarkshire
- St. Mary's Church, Whitekirk, East Lothian

Australia

- Sacred Heart Convent Chapel, Ballarat, Victoria
- St. Andrew's Cathedral, Sydney, New South Wales
- St John's College, University of Sydney, New South Wales
- St. Edward's Catholic Church, Canowindra, New South Wales
- St. Francis Xavier's Cathedral, Geraldton, Western Australia
- St. Mary's Cathedral, Sydney, New South Wales
- St. Patrick's Cathedral, Ballarat, Victoria
- St. Stanislaus' College Bathurst, Bathurst, New South Wales.

United States of America

- St. Peter Chanel Catholic Church, Roswell, Georgia
- Grace and St. Peter's Church, Baltimore, Maryland
- St. Joseph’s Seminary, Yonkers, New York

South Africa

- St. Agnes Catholic Church, Woodstock, Cape Town (1901)

Window for the House of Lords

- Mary Juliana Hardman

=== Other early 19th-century firms ===
- Thomas Willement
- William Warrington
- Charles Edmund Clutterbuck
- William Wailes
- Augustus Welby Pugin

=== Context ===
- Stained glass
- British and Irish stained glass (1811–1918)
- Victorian era
- Gothic Revival
- Poor Man's Bible
