= Mac Gadowsky =

American ice hockey player (born 2002)

- Gadowsky playing for the Army Black Knights in 2025
- Born: January 10, 2002 (age 24) Fairbanks, Alaska, U.S.
- Height: 6 ft 3 in (191 cm)
- Weight: 185 lb (84 kg; 13 st 3 lb)
- Position: Defense
- Shoots: Left
- NCAA team: Penn State University
- NHL draft: Undrafted

Mac Gadowsky (born January 10, 2002) is an American college ice hockey defenseman for Penn State of the National Collegiate Athletic Association (NCAA). He previously played for Army.

== Early life ==
Gadowsky was born in Fairbanks, Alaska, while his father, Guy Gadowsky, served as head coach for Alaska. He played two seasons with the Springfield Jr. Blues and the Fairbanks Ice Dogs of the North American Hockey League (NAHL).

== Playing career ==
Gadowsky began his collegiate career for Army during the 2023–24 season. During his freshman year, he recorded four goals and 19 assists in 28 games. Led all AHA rookie defensemen with 23 points. He scored his first career goal on December 8, 2023, in a game against Mercyhurst. Following the season he was named to the All-Atlantic Hockey Rookie Team, and a finalist for the Atlantic Hockey Rookie of the Year.

During the 2024–25 season, in his sophomore year, he recorded 16 goals and 26 assists in 38 games. During conference play, he led all AHA defensemen in scoring with 11 goals and 22 assists, while his 33 points ranked second among all skaters. His 43 points were a program record in the AHA era. Following the season he was named to the All-Atlantic Hockey America First Team, the Atlantic Hockey America Best Defenseman, and won the Atlantic Hockey America Individual Sportsmanship Award. He was the first player in program history to be named a top-ten finalist for the Hobey Baker Award. He was also named an AHCA East First Team All-American, the first player in program history to receive the honor.

On April 16, 2025, Gadowsky transferred to Penn State for the 2025–26 season, where he will play for his father, Guy.

In December 2025, Gadowsky was called up to the U.S. Collegiate Selects team, an all-star team of NCAA Division I players from various university hockey programs, that participated in the 2025 Spengler Cup (and was coached by his father).

== Personal life ==
Gadowsky's father, Guy, is a former ice hockey player and current head coach for Penn State. His brother, Magnus, is an ice hockey player for Amherst College.

== Career statistics ==
| | | | Regular season | | | | | Playoffs |
| Season | Team | League | GP | G | A | Pts | PIM | GP | G | A | Pts | PIM |
|---|---|---|---|---|---|---|---|---|---|---|---|---|
| 2021–22 | Springfield Jr. Blues | NAHL | 22 | 2 | 10 | 12 | 0 | 3 | 0 | 1 | 1 | 0 |
| 2022–23 | Springfield Jr. Blues | NAHL | 39 | 1 | 13 | 14 | 4 | — | — | — | — | — |
| 2022–23 | Fairbanks Ice Dogs | NAHL | 17 | 2 | 4 | 6 | 2 | — | — | — | — | — |
| 2023–24 | Army | AHA | 28 | 4 | 19 | 23 | 8 | — | — | — | — | — |
| 2024–25 | Army | AHA | 38 | 16 | 26 | 42 | 6 | — | — | — | — | — |
| NCAA totals | | | 66 | 20 | 45 | 65 | 14 | — | — | — | — | — |

== Awards and honors ==
| Award | Year |
College
| All-Atlantic Hockey Rookie Team | 2024 |
| All-Atlantic Hockey America First Team | 2025 |
| Atlantic Hockey America Best Defenseman | 2025 |
| Atlantic Hockey America Individual Sportsmanship Award | 2025 |
| AHCA East First Team All-American | 2025 |

Awards and achievements
| Preceded by Inaugural | Atlantic Hockey America Best Defenseman; 2024–25 | Succeeded by Chris Hedden |
| Preceded by Inaugural | Atlantic Hockey America Individual Sportsmanship Award; 2024–25 | Succeeded by Mack Oliphant |
