= George Albert Tuck =

New Zealand builder, soldier and diarist

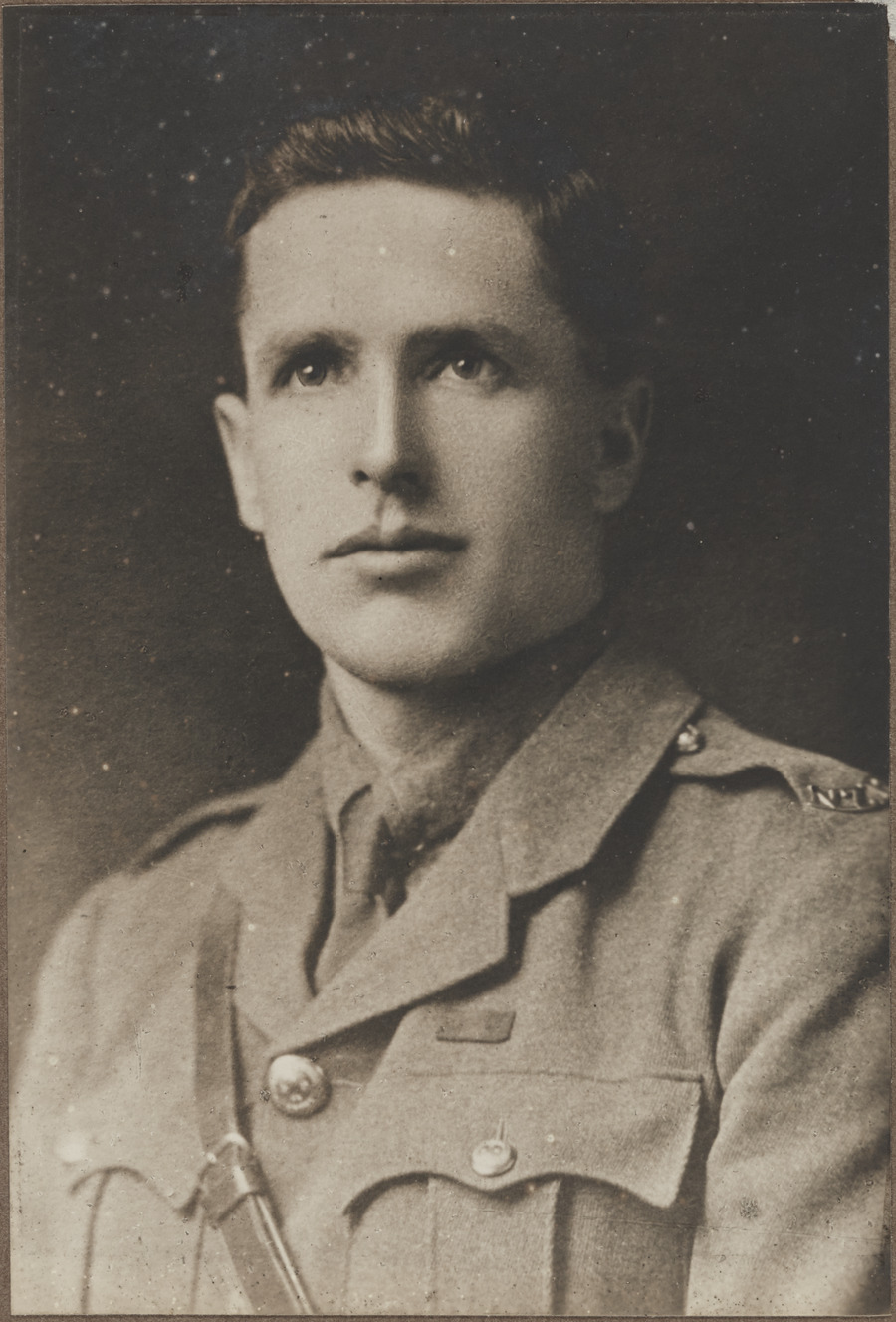
Captain George A. Tuck (1920)

George Albert Tuck (February 13, 1884–June 27, 1981), was a notable New Zealand soldier and diarist during the First World War.

== Career ==
Tuck was born in Cambridge, New Zealand in 1884. With the outbreak of the First World War in 1914, Tuck immediately volunteered and was sent to the 6th Company of the Auckland Battalion. He was a corporal at the landing at Gallipoli in April 1915, he served with the company until it was evacuated to Egypt in late 1915. In March 1916, he was appointed a sergeant major in the 2nd Battalion of the Auckland Infantry Regiment, The unit was sent to France in April 1916, and fought in nearly every major battle there. He was wounded twice at the Somme, and was promoted to lieutenant at Passendale in October 1917 and became battalion adjutant and a captain in March 1918. Tuck was twice mentioned in dispatches, and was awarded a Military Cross in 1918. During the war, he kept a diary, observing the experience of the war and how soldiers fought bravely under great pressure.

== Later years ==
With the end of the war, Tuck went back to New Zealand. By the early 1930s he was working as a journalist in Auckland, and when the Second World War broke out, Tuck, then 55, volunteered to serve but was rejected. His final years were spent in relative isolation in New Lynn, Auckland. He still retained interest in contemporary events, and he opposed the Vietnam War in the 1960s and 1970s. Tuck died on June 27, 1981, at the age of 97.
