= Army Black Knights men's ice hockey =

- Current season
- University: United States Military Academy
- Conference: AHA
- First season: 1903–04
- Head coach: Zach McKelvie; 1st season, 12–17–6 (.429)
- Assistant coaches: Jack Riley; Taylor Ward; Brian Gibbons; Riley McVeigh
- Arena: Tate Rink; West Point, New York
- Colors: Black, gold, and gray

Conference regular season champions
- AHA: 2008

Current uniform

The Army Black Knights men's ice hockey team is a National Collegiate Athletic Association (NCAA) Division I college ice hockey program that represents the United States Military Academy. The Black Knights are members of Atlantic Hockey America and play at the Tate Rink in West Point, New York. They are one of seven teams to have never played in the NCAA Division I men's ice hockey tournament.

== History ==
The men's ice hockey program at West Point has been in existence since the 1903–04 season. The team played outdoors until 1930 when the Smith Rink opened. The team competed as independent members of NCAA Division I from the inaugural season through the 1960–61 season. In 1961 the program became a founding member of the ECAC. The team, known at the time as the Army Cadets, played as members of the ECAC from 1961 to 1962 season through the 1972–73 season before dropping their program to Division II status when the NCAA instituted numerical divisions. The Cadets would remain there until 1980 when they rejoined the ECAC as an associate member. Army became a full ECAC member in 1984 in the aftermath of the Hockey East schism but the Cadets would not remain for long and left the conference in 1990. The Cadets joined the Metro Atlantic Athletic Conference (MAAC), which began sponsoring men's hockey at the time, in 1999 and in 2001 the team name was changed to Army Black Knights along with the other athletic programs at the Academy. In 2003, the MAAC's ice hockey division split off and became the Atlantic Hockey Association, a hockey-only NCAA Division I conference.

In 2007–08 season the Black Knights won their only conference title to date, the Atlantic Hockey Regular Season Championship. In that season the Knights finished with an overall record of 19 wins, 14 losses, and 4 ties and went 17–8–3 in conference play. Took the No. 1 seed into the Atlantic Hockey playoffs and swept (#10) American Int'l two games to none in the three game first round series. The Black Knight's season came to an end in the semifinal game when they lost to (#5) Mercyhurst 2–4.

Shortly after the end of the 2023–24 season, the Atlantic Hockey Association merged with College Hockey America, a women-only league with which it had shared a commissioner and office staff since 2010. The merged league became Atlantic Hockey America.

Since 1950, the Cadets/Black Knights have been coached by a member of the Riley family. Jack Riley, best known for leading the United States to the gold medal at the 1960 Winter Olympics, coached at West Point from 1950 to 1986. He handed the reins to his son Rob in 1986, who in turn handed coaching duties to his younger brother Brian in 2004.

=== Army–RMC rivalry ===
The Army Black Knights have a long-standing rivalry with the Royal Military College of Canada (RMC) Paladins. It is considered one of the longest-running annual international sporting events in the world.

The tradition originated when the commandant of RMC, Sir Archibald McDonnell, and the superintendent of the U.S. Military Academy, Brigadier General Douglas MacArthur, suggested a game of ice hockey between the two schools in 1921. After two years of exchanging ideas, the first game was played on February 23, 1923, at West Point. The Redmen won that first game 3–0. In 1924 the series moved to Kingston, Ontario (the location of RMC), thus beginning the tradition of rotating venues. This was Army's first away game and up until 1941, the West Point Game was the only time that Army played away from the Academy.

== All-time coaching records ==
As of the end of the 2025–26 season.

Tenure	Coach	Years	Record	Pct.
1903–1904	Edward Leonard King	1	5–1–0	.833
1904–1907	Robert Foy	3	15–8–0	.652
1907–1910	George Russell	3	5–7–4	.438
1910–1912	LeRoy Bartlett	2	3–4–1	.438
1912–1914	Philip Gordon	2	7–6–0	.538
1914–1917	Frank Purdon	3	9–10–1	.475
1917–1918	Joseph Viner	1	6–3–0	.667
1918–1920	Philip Day	2	6–4–1	.591
1920–1923	Talbot Hunter	3	12–12–2	.500
1923–1943	Ray Marchand	20	76–106–9	.421
1943–1944	John Hines	1	5–4–0	.556
1944–1945	Robert Lutz	1	7–2–1	.750
1945–1950	Len Patten	5	33–35–2	.486
1950–1986	Jack Riley	36	542–343–20	.610
1988–2004	Rob Riley	18	257–288–33	.473
2004–2025	Brian Riley	21	258–379–94	.417
2025–Present	Zach McKelvie	1	12–17–6	.429
Totals	17 coaches	123 seasons	1,258–1,229–174	.504

== Awards ==
=== U.S. Hockey Hall of Fame ===
The following individuals have been inducted into the United States Hockey Hall of Fame.

- Jack Riley (1979, 2000†)

† As the coach of the 1960 Olympic team.

=== IIHF Hall of Fame ===
The following individuals have been inducted into the IIHF Hall of Fame.

- Jack Riley (1998)

=== Army Sports Hall of Fame ===
The following individuals have been inducted into the Army Sports Hall of Fame.

- Jack Riley (2004)

=== Lester Patrick Award ===
The following individuals have been awarded the Lester Patrick Award.

- Jack Riley (1986, 2002)

=== NCAA ===
==== Individual awards ====
Spencer Penrose Award

- Jack Riley (1957, 1960)

Lowes' Senior CLASS Award

- Cheyne Rocha (2013)

Derek Hines Unsung Hero Award

- Chase Podsiad (2008)

NCAA Scoring Champion

- David Merhar (1969)

==== All-Americans ====
AHCA First Team All-Americans

- 2024–25: Mac Gadowsky, D

AHCA Second Team All-Americans

- 2007–08: Josh Kassel, G
- 2020–21: Trevin Kozlowski, G; Colin Bilek, F
- 2021–22: Colin Bilek, F

=== MAAC ===
==== Individual awards ====
Offensive Player of the Year

- Chris Casey (2002)

Goaltender of the Year

- Brad Roberts (2003)

Defensive Rookie of the Year

- Brad Roberts (2003)

==== All–MAAC teams ====
First Team

- Brad Roberts (2003)

Second Team

- Joe Dudek (2003)

Rookie Team

- Chris Casey (2002)
- Brad Roberts (2003)

=== Atlantic Hockey Association ===
==== Individual awards ====
Player of the Year

- Josh Kassel: 2008

Rookie of the Year

- Tyler Pham: 2015
- Lincoln Hatten: 2021
- Max Itagaki: 2023

Best Defenseman

- Zach McKelvie: 2008
- Alexander Wilkinson: 2018

Individual Sportsmanship Award

- Chris Garceau: 2005
- Zak Zaremba: 2015
- Ryan Nick: 2017
- Alex Wilkinson: 2020
- Daniel Haider: 2022

Regular Season Scoring Trophy

- Colin Bilek: 2022

Regular Season Goaltending Award

- Josh Kassel: 2008
- Trevin Kozlowski: 2021

Coach of the Year

- Brian Riley: 2006, 2007, 2008, 2021

==== All-Atlantic Hockey Teams ====
First Team

- Josh Kassel (2008)
- Zach McKelvie (2008, 2009)
- Luke Flicek (2008)
- Owen Meyer (2009)
- Alexander Wilkinson (2018)
- Trevin Kozlowski (2021)
- Thomas Farrell (2021)
- Colin Bilek (2021, 2022)

Second Team

- Brad Roberts (2006)
- Tim Manthey (2006, 2007)
- Josh Kassel (2007)
- Owen Meyer (2008)
- Marcel Alvarez (2010, 2011)
- Cody Omilusik (2010)
- Parker Gahagen (2016, 2017)
- Michael Wilson (2018)
- Dalton MacAfee (2019)
- Dominic Franco (2020)
- John Zimmerman (2021)
- Gavin Abric (2022)
- Anthony Firriolo (2022)
- Joey Baez (2023, 2024)

Third Team

- Luke Flicek (2007)
- Cody Omilusik (2011)
- John Keranen (2023)

Rookie Team

- Tim Manthey (2006)
- Owen Meyer (2007)
- Marcel Alvarez (2009)
- Joe Kozlak (2013)
- C. J. Reuschlein (2014)
- Tyler Pham (2015)
- Alexander Wilkinson (2017)
- Dominic Franco (2017)
- John Zimmerman (2018)
- Anthony Firriolo (2020)
- Lincoln Hatten (2021)
- Max Itagaki (2023)
- Mac Gadowsky (2024)

=== Atlantic Hockey America ===
==== Individual awards ====
Goaltender of the Year

- J. J. Cataldo (2026)

Best Defenseman

- Mac Gadowsky (2025)

Individual Sportsmanship Award

- Mac Gadowsky (2025)

==== All-Conference teams ====
First Team All-Atlantic Hockey America

- 2024–25: Mac Gadowsky, D
- 2025–26: J. J. Cataldo, G

Second Team All-Atlantic Hockey America

- 2025–26: Jack Ivey, F

All-Atlantic Hockey America Rookie Team

- 2024–25: Jack Ivey, F

== Statistical leaders ==
=== Career scoring leaders ===
GP = Games played; G = Goals; A = Assists; Pts = Points; PIM = Penalty minutes

Player	Years	GP	G	A	PTS	PIM
Dave Rost	1973–1977		104	226	330	
Tom Rost	1976–1980		118	169	287	284
George Clark	1971–1975		153	113	266	
Jim Knowlton	1978–1982		90	172	262	
David Merhar	1966–1969		112	117	229	
Robbie Craig	1980–1984		86	135	221	
Ed Collazzo	1979–1983		93	104	197	
Frank Keating	1978–1982		65	131	196	
Dan Cox	1979–1983		61	133	194	
Biff Shea	1981–1985		68	120	188	

=== Career goaltending leaders ===
GP = Games played; Min = Minutes played; GA = Goals against; SO = Shutouts; SV% = Save percentage; GAA = Goals against average

Minimum 35 games

Player	Years	GP	MIN	W	L	T	GA	SO	SV%	GAA
Trevin Kozlowski	2017–2021	65	3865	36	21	6	142	3	.911	2.18
Jack Shepard	1960–1963								.920	2.20
Neil Meiras	1961–1964								.896	2.28
Parker Gahagen	2013–2017	110	6372	41	49	16	255	10	.926	2.40
Josh Kassel	2005–2009	77	4415	37	31	7	181	8	.909	2.46

Statistics current through the start of the 2022-23 season.

== Roster ==
As of July 31, 2025.

No.	Nat.	Player	Class	Pos	Height	Weight	DoB	Hometown	Previous team	NHL rights
1	(United States)	Jacob Biron	Sophomore	G	6' 3" (1.91 m)	174 lb (79 kg)	2004-06-26	Buffalo, New York	Kemptville 73's (CCHL)	—
2	(United States)	Lukas McCloskey	Freshman	D	6' 3" (1.91 m)	205 lb (93 kg)	2005-03-25	Newport Beach, California	Wenatchee Wild (WHL)	—
3	(United States)	Easton Zueger	Junior	D	5' 8" (1.73 m)	190 lb (86 kg)	2003-06-07	Sioux Falls, South Dakota	Sioux City Musketeers (USHL)	—
4	(United States)	Benjamin Ivey	Sophomore	F	6' 4" (1.93 m)	220 lb (100 kg)	2004-02-12	San Diego, California	Amarillo Wranglers (NAHL)	—
5	(United States)	Jack Ivey	Sophomore	F	6' 3" (1.91 m)	192 lb (87 kg)	2004-02-12	San Diego, California	Amarillo Wranglers (NAHL)	—
6	(United States)	Pierce Patterson	Junior	D	5' 9" (1.75 m)	165 lb (75 kg)	2002-02-26	Valrico, Florida	Amarillo Wranglers (NAHL)	—
7	(United States)	Liam Chapman	Freshman	D	6' 1" (1.85 m)	187 lb (85 kg)	2004-03-11	Weare, New Hampshire	Rochester Jr. Americans (NAHL)	—
8	(United States)	Vincent Salice	Junior	F	5' 7" (1.7 m)	175 lb (79 kg)	2003-02-28	Commerce Township, Michigan	Omaha Lancers (USHL)	—
9	(United States)	Nils Forselius	Sophomore	F	5' 9" (1.75 m)	170 lb (77 kg)	2003-10-30	Guilford, Connecticut	Maine Nordiques (NAHL)	—
10	(United States)	Dylan Wegner	Sophomore	F	6' 2" (1.88 m)	174 lb (79 kg)	2004-06-01	Nashville, Tennessee	Merritt Centennials (BCHL)	—
11	(United States)	Brock Jones	Freshman	F	5' 11" (1.8 m)	183 lb (83 kg)	2004-11-15	Lake View, New York	Philadelphia Rebels (NAHL)	—
12	(United States)	Sam Groebner	Sophomore	F	6' 3" (1.91 m)	201 lb (91 kg)	2003-03-03	Apple Valley, Minnesota	Wisconsin Windigo (NAHL)	—
13	(United States)	Jacob Ligi	Freshman	F	5' 10" (1.78 m)	176 lb (80 kg)	2004-03-16	South Lyon, Michigan	Chippewa Steel (NAHL)	—
14	(United States)	Owen Nolan	Senior	D	6' 0" (1.83 m)	185 lb (84 kg)	2000-03-10	Mahopac, New York	Lone Star Brahmas (NAHL)	—
15	(United States)	Lucas Kanta	Senior	F	6' 2" (1.88 m)	195 lb (88 kg)	2001-04-20	Grand Forks, North Dakota	Minnesota Magicians (NAHL)	—
16	(United States)	Kareem El-Bashir	Freshman	F	5' 10" (1.78 m)	176 lb (80 kg)	2004-03-02	Reston, Virginia	Maryland Black Bears (NAHL)	—
17	(United States)	Noah Alvarez	Sophomore	F	5' 11" (1.8 m)	185 lb (84 kg)	2003-03-30	Los Angeles, California	Nanaimo Clippers (NAHL)	—
18	(United States)	Jon Bell	Junior	D	5' 10" (1.78 m)	205 lb (93 kg)	2002-06-22	St. Cloud, Minnesota	Wisconsin Windigo (NAHL)	—
19	(United States)	Nik Hong	Junior	F	5' 11" (1.8 m)	185 lb (84 kg)	2002-08-27	Minneapolis, Minnesota	St. Cloud Norsemen (NAHL)	—
20	(United States)	Sean Vlasich	Senior	D	5' 9" (1.75 m)	175 lb (79 kg)	2001-04-20	Hillsdale, New Jersey	North Iowa Bulls (NAHL)	—
21	(United States)	Stephen Willey	Senior	F	6' 1" (1.85 m)	195 lb (88 kg)	2001-03-26	Shelton, Connecticut	New Jersey Titans (NAHL)	—
22	(United States)	Jude Brower	Senior	D	6' 1" (1.85 m)	180 lb (82 kg)	2001-06-11	Mahopac, New York	Boston Junior Bruins (NCDC)	—
23	(United States)	Joey Baez	Senior	F	5' 9" (1.75 m)	175 lb (79 kg)	2000-01-12	Tampa, Florida	Lone Star Brahmas (NAHL)	—
24	(United States)	Billy Batten	Freshman	F	5' 9" (1.75 m)	174 lb (79 kg)	2004-09-24	Phoenixville, Pennsylvania	Minot Minotauros (NAHL)	—
25	(United States)	Barron Woodring	Junior	F	6' 2" (1.88 m)	200 lb (91 kg)	2002-07-05	Chicago, Illinois	Sioux City Musketeers (USHL)	—
26	(United States)	Joey Dosan	Senior	F	6' 6" (1.98 m)	220 lb (100 kg)	2001-03-20	Bloomington, Minnesota	Springfield Jr. Blues (NAHL)	—
27	(United States)	Trevor Smith	Senior	F	5' 9" (1.75 m)	185 lb (84 kg)	2001-03-02	Raleigh, North Carolina	Boston Advantage (NCDC)	—
28	(United States)	Brent Keefer	Junior	F	6' 0" (1.83 m)	170 lb (77 kg)	2001-09-28	Colorado Springs, Colorado	Northeast Generals (NAHL)	—
29	(United States)	Adam Marshall	Sophomore	F	5' 10" (1.78 m)	181 lb (82 kg)	2003-07-14	Wayzata, Minnesota	Trail Smoke Eaters (NAHL)	—
30	(United States)	J. J. Cataldo	Sophomore	G	6' 0" (1.83 m)	170 lb (77 kg)	2003-02-20	Stuart, Florida	Springfield Jr. Blues (NAHL)	—
33	(United States)	Gus Holt	Junior	G	6' 3" (1.91 m)	206 lb (93 kg)	2003-02-21	Bowling Green, Ohio	Victoria Grizzlies (BCHL)	—

== Olympians ==
This is a list of Army alumni were a part of an Olympic team.

Name	Position	Army Tenure	Team	Year	Finish
Lawrence Palmer	Goaltender	1956–1959	(United States) USA	1960	Gold

== Black Knights in the NHL ==
As of July 1, 2025.

Player	Position	Team(s)	Years	Stanley Cups
Dan Hinote	Center	COL, STL	1999–2009	1

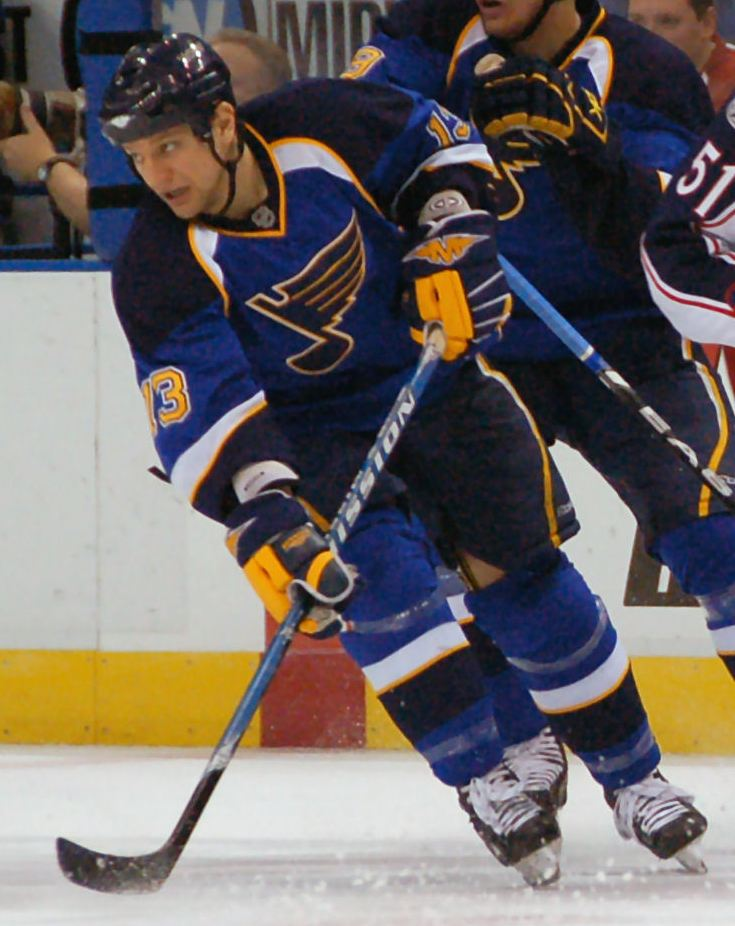
Dan Hinote

== See also ==
- Army Black Knights
