= George Tuck (cricketer) =

English cricketer and lawyer

Personal information
- Full name: George Hustler Tuck
- Born: 28 April 1843; Norwich, Norfolk, England
- Died: 13 December 1920 (aged 77); Norwich, Norfolk, England
- Batting: Right-handed
- Role: Wicket-keeper

Domestic team information
- Years: Team
- 1863–1866: Cambridge University
- 1866–1876: MCC

Career statistics
Competition	First-class
Matches	18
Runs scored	375
Batting average	11.71
100s/50s	0/1
Top score	51
Catches/stumpings	9/1
- Source: Cricinfo, 26 January 2023

George Hustler Tuck (28 April 1843 – 13 December 1920) was an English lawyer and a cricketer who played in 18 first-class cricket matches between 1863 and 1876, most of them for Cambridge University and the Marylebone Cricket Club (MCC). He was born and died at Norwich, Norfolk.

Tuck was educated at Eton College and at Trinity College, Cambridge. He was in the Eton cricket team as a right-handed middle-order batsman in both the 1861 and 1862 Eton v Harrow matches. In his first match for Cambridge University in 1863, he also kept wicket, but that does not appear to have been a regular job, and he was merely an opening batsman in the 1863 University Match against Oxford University, his only other first-class match that season. In all, he appeared four times in the University Match, and was unsuccessful on each occasion, Cambridge losing all four games. His greatest success as a batsman came in consecutive games against MCC and Surrey in 1865 in which he played two separate innings of 51. After leaving Cambridge University, Tuck played in only a few first-class matches for MCC teams and for Southgate Cricket Club in 1867, and a single further match for MCC in 1876.

Tuck graduated from Cambridge University in 1866 with a Bachelor of Arts degree. Before graduation, he was attached to Lincoln's Inn, and he was then called to the bar in 1868, practising as a barrister on the South Eastern Circuit. He was later a justice of the peace in Norfolk and a deputy lieutenant of Norfolk, and he lived at Blofield Hall, near Norwich.
