= Lindenwood Lions men's ice hockey statistical leaders =

The Lindenwood Lions men's ice hockey statistical leaders are individual statistical leaders of the Lindenwood Lions men's ice hockey program in various categories, including goals, assists, points, and saves. Within those areas, the lists identify single-game, single-season, and career leaders. The Lions represent Lindenwood University as an independent in the NCAA.

Lindenwood founded its men's program as a club team in 2003. Lindenwood began competing in Division I intercollegiate ice hockey in 2022. These lists are updated through the end of the 2022–23 season.

== Goals ==
Career
Rk	Player	Goals	Seasons
1	David Gagnon	32	2022–23 2023–24 2024–25
2	Jake Southgate	20	2023–24 2024–25 2025–26
3	Kyle Jeffers	16	2022–23 2023–24
4	Caige Sterzer	14	2022–23 2023–24
	Jaeden Mercier	14	2023–24 2024–25 2025–26
	Jacob Fletcher	14	2025–26
7	Hunter Johannes	13	2022–23
	Ethan Zielke	13	2023–24 2024–25 2025–26
	Olivier Houde	13	2025–26
10	Drew Kuzma	12	2022–23 2023–24 2024–25 2025–26

Season
Rk	Player	Goals	Season
1	Jacob Fletcher	14	2025–26
2	Hunter Johannes	13	2022–23
	David Gagnon	13	2022–23
	Olivier Houde	13	2025–26
5	David Gagnon	11	2024–25
6	Louis-Philippe Fontaine	10	2025–26
	Giovanni Morneau	10	2025–26
8	Kyle Jeffers	9	2023–24
	Charles Savoie	9	2025–26
10	Andy Willis	8	2022–23
	David Gagnon	8	2023–24
	Caige Sterzer	8	2023–24
	Jaeden Mercier	8	2024–25
	Jake Southgate	8	2025–26

Single Game
Rk	Player	Goals	Season	Opponent
1	Aiden Yakimchuk	3	2023–24	Stonehill
	Jaeden Mercier	3	2024–25	Alaska-Anchorage
3	David Gagnon	2	2022–23	Air Force
	Cade DeStefani	2	2022–23	Denver
	Adam Conquest	2	2022–23	Stonehill
	Caige Sterzer	2	2022–23	Arizona State
	Andy Willis	2	2022–23	Alaska-Anchorage
	Kyle Jeffers	2	2022–23	Alaska-Anchorage
	Zachary Aughe	2	2023–24	Augustana
	Jaeden Mercier	2	2023–24	Penn State
	Kyle Jeffers	2	2023–24	Stonehill
	Caige Sterzer	2	2023–24	Stonehill
	Ethan Zielke	2	2023–24	Stonehill
	Jaeden Mercier	2	2024–25	Wisconsin
	David Gagnon	2	2024–25	Miami
	Jaeden Mercier	2	2024–25	Ohio State
	Noah Houle	2	2024–25	Notre Dame
	Patrick Schmiedlin	2	2024–25	Alaska
	Charles Savoie	2	2025–26	Lake Superior
	Giovanni Morneau	2	2025–26	Lake Superior
	Adam Raesler	2	2025–26	Lake Superior
	Giovanni Morneau	2	2025–26	Miami
	Olivier Houde	2	2025–26	Miami
	Nolan Seed	2	2025–26	Robert Morris
	Connor Gengle	2	2025–26	Robert Morris
	Jake Southgate	2	2025–26	Stonehill
	Jacob Fletcher	2	2025–26	Alaska

== Assists ==
Career
Rk	Player	Assists	Seasons
1	David Gagnon	42	2022–23 2023–24 2024–25
2	Jake Southgate	32	2023–24 2024–25 2025–26
3	Kyle Jeffers	21	2022–23 2023–24
	Jack Anderson	21	2022–23 2023–24 2024–25
	Giovanni Morneau	21	2025–26
6	Caige Sterzer	19	2022–23 2023–24
	Drew Kuzma	19	2022–23 2023–24 2024–25 2025–26
	Ethan Zielke	19	2023–24 2024–25 2025–26
	Nolan Seed	19	2025–26
10	Joe Prouty	18	2022–23 2023–24 2024–25
	Charles Savoie	18	2025–26

Season
Rk	Player	Assists	Season
1	Giovanni Morneau	21	2025–26
2	Nolan Seed	19	2025–26
3	Charles Savoie	18	2025–26
4	David Gagnon	17	2022–23
	David Gagnon	17	2024–25
6	Hunter Johannes	16	2022–23
	Jake Southgate	16	2025–26
8	Andy Willis	15	2022–23
	Olivier Houde	15	2025–26
10	Ryan Finnegan	14	2022–23
	Caige Sterzer	14	2023–24
	Ethan Elias	14	2025–26

Single Game
Rk	Player	Assists	Season	Opponent
1	Hunter Johannes	4	2022–23	Stonehill
2	David Gagnon	3	2022–23	Bentley
	Ryan Finnegan	3	2022–23	Stonehill
	Andy Willis	3	2022–23	Alaska-Anchorage
	Hunter Johannes	3	2022–23	Alaska-Anchorage
	Ethan Zielke	3	2023–24	Augustana
	David Gagnon	3	2023–24	Stonehill
	Caige Sterzer	3	2023–24	Stonehill
	Ethan Zielke	3	2025–26	Lake Superior
	Nolan Seed	3	2025–26	Robert Morris
	Giovanni Morneau	3	2025–26	Robert Morris
	Nolan Seed	3	2025–26	Alaska

== Points ==
Career
Rk	Player	Points	Seasons
1	David Gagnon	74	2022–23 2023–24 2024–25
2	Jake Southgate	52	2023–24 2024–25 2025–26
3	Kyle Jeffers	37	2022–23 2023–24
4	Caige Sterzer	33	2022–23 2023–24
5	Ethan Zielke	32	2023–24 2024–25 2025–26
6	Drew Kuzma	31	2022–23 2023–24 2024–25 2025–26
	Giovanni Morneau	31	2025–26
8	Jaeden Mercier	30	2023–24 2024–25 2025–26
9	Hunter Johannes	29	2022–23
10	Olivier Houde	28	2025–26

Season
Rk	Player	Points	Season
1	Giovanni Morneau	31	2025–26
2	David Gagnon	30	2022–23
3	Hunter Johannes	29	2022–23
4	David Gagnon	28	2024–25
	Olivier Houde	28	2025–26
6	Charles Savoie	27	2025–26
7	Jacob Fletcher	25	2025–26
8	Jake Southgate	24	2025–26
9	Andy Willis	23	2022–23
10	Caige Sterzer	22	2023–24
	Nolan Seed	22	2025–26

Single Game
Rk	Player	Points	Season	Opponent
1	Andy Willis	5	2022–23	Alaska-Anchorage
	Aiden Yakimchuk	5	2023–24	Stonehill
	Nolan Seed	5	2025–26	Robert Morris
4	David Gagnon	4	2022–23	Bentley
	Hunter Johannes	4	2022–23	Stonehill
	Hunter Johannes	4	2022–23	Alaska-Anchorage
	David Gagnon	4	2023–24	Stonehill
	Jacob Fletcher	4	2025–26	Alaska
9	David Gagnon	3	2022–23	Michigan
	David Gagnon	3	2022–23	Air Force
	Ryan Finnegan	3	2022–23	Air Force
	Hunter Johannes	3	2022–23	Bentley
	Hunter Johannes	3	2022–23	Army
	Kyle Jeffers	3	2022–23	Long Island
	Ryan Finnegan	3	2022–23	Stonehill
	David Gagnon	3	2022–23	Stonehill
	Andy Willis	3	2022–23	Stonehill
	Jack Anderson	3	2022–23	Stonehill
	Ethan Zielke	3	2023–24	Augustana
	Kyle Jeffers	3	2023–24	Stonehill
	Caige Sterzer	3	2023–24	Stonehill
	Jaeden Mercier	3	2023–24	Stonehill
	Ethan Zielke	3	2023–24	Stonehill
	Caige Sterzer	3	2023–24	Stonehill
	Zachary Aughe	3	2023–24	Stonehill
	David Gagnon	3	2024–25	Miami
	David Gagnon	3	2024–25	Stonehill
	Kristof Papp	3	2024–25	Alaska
	Jaeden Mercier	3	2024–25	Alaska-Anchorage
	David Gagnon	3	2024–25	Alaska-Anchorage
	Charles Savoie	3	2025–26	Lake Superior
	Ethan Zielke	3	2025–26	Lake Superior
	Giovanni Morneau	3	2025–26	Lake Superior
	Jake Southgate	3	2025–26	Miami
	Charles Savoie	3	2025–26	Robert Morris
	Giovanni Morneau	3	2025–26	Robert Morris
	Giovanni Morneau	3	2025–26	Stonehill
	Olivier Houde	3	2025–26	Stonehill
	Nolan Seed	3	2025–26	Alaska
	Olivier Houde	3	2025–26	Alaska-Anchorage

== Saves ==
Career
Rk	Player	Saves	Seasons
1	Trent Burnham	1,568	2022–23 2023–24
2	Owen Bartoszkiewicz	845	2024–25
3	Liam Beerman	467	2025–26
4	Klayton Knapp	459	2025–26
5	Roni Salmenkangas	269	2022–23
6	Matthew Ladd	238	2022–23
7	Matthew Syverson	99	2023–24
8	Henry Graham	42	2024–25
9	Alexander Aslanidis	19	2024–25

Season
Rk	Player	Saves	Season
1	Trent Burnham	958	2023–24
2	Owen Bartoszkiewicz	845	2024–25
3	Trent Burnham	610	2022–23
4	Liam Beerman	467	2025–26
5	Klayton Knapp	459	2025–26
6	Roni Salmenkangas	269	2022–23
7	Matthew Ladd	238	2022–23
8	Matthew Syverson	99	2023–24
9	Henry Graham	42	2024–25
10	Alexander Aslanidis	19	2024–25

Single Game
Rk	Player	Saves	Season	Opponent
1	Trent Burnham	64	2023–24	Western Michigan
2	Trent Burnham	59	2023–24	St. Thomas
3	Roni Salmenkangas	54	2022–23	American International
4	Owen Bartoszkiewicz	52	2024–25	Michigan State
5	Trent Burnham	51	2023–24	Wisconsin
6	Trent Burnham	48	2022–23	Michigan
7	Trent Burnham	47	2022–23	Wisconsin
	Trent Burnham	47	2022–23	Alaska
9	Roni Salmenkangas	46	2022–23	Alaska
	Liam Beerman	46	2025–26	Maine
