= 2024–25 Stonehill Skyhawks men's ice hockey season =

- Conference: Independent
- Home ice: Bridgewater Ice Arena; Warrior Ice Arena

Rankings
- USCHO: NR
- USA Hockey: NR

Record
- Overall: 12–22–0
- Home: 7–7–0
- Road: 5–15–0

Coaches and captains
- Head coach: David Berard
- Assistant coaches: Matthew Creamer; Brian Rigali
- Captain: Frank Ireland
- Alternate captain(s): Cam Mannion; Devlin O'Brien; Evan Orr; Henri Schreifels

The 2024–25 Stonehill Skyhawks men's ice hockey season was the 46th season of play for the program and 3rd at the Division I level. The Skyhawks represented Stonehill College in the 2024–25 NCAA Division I men's ice hockey season, played their home games at the Bridgewater Ice Arena and were coached by David Berard in his 1st season.

== Season ==
After producing one of the worst seasons in college hockey history, there was nowhere to go but up for Stonehill. New head coach David Berard brought in a modest number of new players, however, he did address the team's biggest weakness. Connor Androlewicz and Linards Lipskis were both brought in to compete for the starting job in goal and, though the Skyhawks already had two netminders on the roster, neither Gavin FitzPatrick nor Dylan Ghaemi were likely to assume the primary role in the crease after their performances the previous season. With Frank Ireland, who had led the team in scoring in each of its first two Division I seasons, named team captain, Stonehill got off on the right foot by defeating Merrimack to earn the program's first road win against a D-I opponent.

Two weeks later, the Skyhawks got their second win of the season, equaling the total from all of 2024. Though Stonehill's offense was inconsistent for much of the season, the defense was vastly improved from what it had been the year before. Androlewicz, who had just 6 games of playing experience in four years at Maine, assumed control of the Skyhawks' net and helped the team nearly halve its goals allowed. Androlewicz was aided by a much better effort by the Stonehill defense which allowed 297 fewer shots on goal. The improved blueline allowed the team to be far more competitive throughout the season and sextuple win total.

Stonehill had several program first during the season, including the first shutout against a Division I opponent when they defeated St. Lawrence 4–0 on November 1. Additionally, the team also got its first win over a ranked D-I team when they dropped Massachusetts Lowell on January 18.

Though the Skyhawks finished the year 10 games under .500, the team's dramatic turnaround in just one season led some to believe that Berard should receive some consideration as the national coach of the year. Though unlikely, there's no denying that Stonehill had finally begun to like an actual Division I team in 2025.

== Departures ==
Player	Position	Nationality	Cause
Matt Allen	Forward	United States	Graduation (retired)
Cam Collins	Forward	United States	Transferred to Saint Anselm
Nolan FitzPatrick	Forward	United States	Graduation (retired)
Greg Japchen	Defenseman	United States	Transferred to Robert Morris
Ryan King	Forward	United States	Graduation (retired)
Michael Martignetti	Defenseman	United States	Transferred to Saint Anselm
Dylan Meilun	Goaltender	Canada	Transferred to Robert Morris
Max Pineo	Forward	United States	Graduate transfer to Wentworth
Carter Rapalje	Forward	United States	Transferred to Long Island
Jack Shemligian	Defenseman	United States	Left program (retired)
Dean Schwenninger	Forward	Switzerland	Left mid-season (signed with EHC Visp)
William Tripp	Defenseman	United States	Transferred to Connecticut College

== Recruiting ==
Player	Position	Nationality	Age	Notes
Zachary Aben	Forward	United States	20	Shavertown, PA
Connor Androlewicz	Goaltender	United States	23	St. Louis, MO; graduate transfer from Maine
Leo Chambers	Forward	Canada	20	Toronto, ON
Justin Gibson	Defenseman	United States	21	Pittsburgh, PA
Brady Hunter	Forward	Canada	22	Enfield, NS; transfer from Merrimack
Teddy Lagerback	Forward	United States	23	Chanhassen, MN; transfer from Miami
Joel Lehtinen	Forward	United States	20	Dallas, TX
Linards Lipskis	Goaltender	Latvia	21	Riga, LAT
Cole Melady	Forward	Canada	21	Seaforth, ON
Zach Nicolas	Forward	Canada	20	Winnipeg, MB
Devlin O'Brien	Forward	Canada	22	Toronto, ON; transfer from Merrimack
Evan Orr	Defenseman	United States	23	Shelby Township, MI; transfer from Michigan Tech

== Roster ==
As of September 17, 2024.

No.	Nat.	Player	Class	Pos	Height	Weight	DoB	Hometown	Previous team	NHL rights
2	(United States)	Riley Rosenthal	Freshman	D	6' 3" (1.91 m)	214 lb (97 kg)	2003-12-10	Boca Raton, Florida	Odessa Jackalopes (NAHL)	—
4	(Canada)	Charles Banquier	Sophomore	D	6' 2" (1.88 m)	200 lb (91 kg)	2002-10-06	Oakville, Ontario	Prince George Spruce Kings (BCHL)	—
5	(United States)	Ryan Davies	Junior	D	5' 10" (1.78 m)	179 lb (81 kg)	2001-03-27	Arlington, Massachusetts	Valley Jr. Warriors (EHL)	—
6	(United States)	Justin Gibson	Freshman	D	6' 1" (1.85 m)	190 lb (86 kg)	2003-05-29	Pittsburgh, Pennsylvania	Johnstown Tomahawks (NAHL)	—
7	(United States)	Cam Gaudette	Senior	D	6' 1" (1.85 m)	190 lb (86 kg)	2000-06-01	Braintree, Massachusetts	Northeastern (HEA)	—
8	(United States)	Cam Mannion (A)	Senior	F	6' 1" (1.85 m)	202 lb (92 kg)	2001-10-31	Dorchester, Massachusetts	South Shore Kings (NCDC)	—
9	(Canada)	Brady Hunter	Sophomore	F	5' 8" (1.73 m)	174 lb (79 kg)	2002-07-27	Enfield, Nova Scotia	Merrimack (HEA)	—
10	(United States)	J. J. Grainda	Sophomore	F	6' 3" (1.91 m)	190 lb (86 kg)	2002-08-01	Carmel, Indiana	Chippewa Steel (NAHL)	—
12	(United States)	Conor Ronayne	Sophomore	F	5' 11" (1.8 m)	179 lb (81 kg)	2002-07-29	Plymouth, Michigan	Smiths Falls Bears (CCHL)	—
13	(Canada)	Leo Chambers	Freshman	F	6' 1" (1.85 m)	174 lb (79 kg)	2003-12-22	Toronto, Ontario	Steinbach Pistons (MJHL)	—
14	(Canada)	Cole Melady	Freshman	F	5' 11" (1.8 m)	187 lb (85 kg)	2003-07-14	Seaforth, Ontario	Coquitlam Express (BCHL)	—
15	(Canada)	Devlin O'Brien (A)	Junior	F	5' 11" (1.8 m)	185 lb (84 kg)	2002-04-05	Toronto, Ontario	Merrimack (HEA)	—
16	(Finland)	Joel Lehtinen	Freshman	F	6' 2" (1.88 m)	181 lb (82 kg)	2003-11-12	Dallas, Texas	Minot Minotauros (NAHL)	—
17	(United States)	Hunter Hastings	Sophomore	F	6' 1" (1.85 m)	195 lb (88 kg)	2002-02-07	Scottsdale, Arizona	New Mexico Ice Wolves (NAHL)	—
19	(United States)	Frank Ireland (C)	Junior	F	5' 11" (1.8 m)	185 lb (84 kg)	2001-02-06	South Easton, Massachusetts	Boston Jr. Bruins (NCDC)	—
20	(United States)	Henri Schreifels (A)	Senior	F	6' 2" (1.88 m)	195 lb (88 kg)	2000-07-01	Newbury Park, California	Rensselaer (ECAC)	—
21	(United States)	Devon Carlstorm	Sophomore	D	6' 3" (1.91 m)	185 lb (84 kg)	2002-03-05	Palm Beach Gardens, Florida	Aberdeen Wings (NAHL)	—
22	(United States)	Jake Cady	Senior	F	5' 9" (1.75 m)	190 lb (86 kg)	2001-07-04	Raynham, Massachusetts	South Shore Kings (NCDC)	—
23	(Canada)	Justin Barker	Sophomore	F	6' 1" (1.85 m)	185 lb (84 kg)	2002-11-07	Calgary, Alberta	Calgary Canucks (AJHL)	—
24	(United States)	Anthony Galante	Sophomore	F	5' 11" (1.8 m)	175 lb (79 kg)	2002-04-18	Morganville, New Jersey	Johnstown Tomahawks (NAHL)	—
25	(Switzerland)	Dean Schwenninger	Junior	F	5' 9" (1.75 m)	170 lb (77 kg)	2001-03-05	Zürich, Switzerland	Minot Minotauros (NAHL)	—
26	(United States)	Evan Orr (A)	Junior	D	5' 11" (1.8 m)	185 lb (84 kg)	2001-01-09	Shelby Township, Michigan	Michigan Tech (CCHA)	—
28	(United States)	Zach Aben	Freshman	F	5' 9" (1.75 m)	181 lb (82 kg)	2003-12-12	Shavertown, Pennsylvania	Johnstown Tomahawks (NAHL)	—
29	(United States)	Connor Androlewicz	Graduate	G	6' 2" (1.88 m)	194 lb (88 kg)	2000-11-28	St. Louis, Missouri	Maine (HEA)	—
30	(United States)	Dylan Ghaemi	Junior	G	6' 4" (1.93 m)	200 lb (91 kg)	2001-12-30	Fairport, New York	Järvso (Hockeytrean)	—
31	(Latvia)	Linards Lipskis	Freshman	G	6' 2" (1.88 m)	190 lb (86 kg)	2003-07-03	Riga, Latvia	Wisconsin Windigo (NAHL)	—
34	(United States)	Teddy Lagerbäck	Junior	F	6' 1" (1.85 m)	196 lb (89 kg)	2001-08-21	Minnetonka, Minnesota	Miami (NCHC)	—
35	(United States)	Gavin FitzPatrick	Senior	G	6' 0" (1.83 m)	185 lb (84 kg)	2002-01-09	Bridgewater, Massachusetts	South Shore Kings (NCDC)	—
37	(United States)	Kyle Heath	Senior	F	5' 8" (1.73 m)	160 lb (73 kg)	2002-04-28	West Bridgewater, Massachusetts	Middlesex School (USHS–MA)	—
43	(United States)	Jake LaRusso	Sophomore	F	5' 11" (1.8 m)	174 lb (79 kg)	2002-03-16	Colts Neck, New Jersey	Northeast Generals (NAHL)	—
44	(Canada)	Zach Nicolas	Freshman	F	6' 5" (1.96 m)	203 lb (92 kg)	2004-02-10	Winnipeg, Manitoba	Winkler Flyers (MJHL)	—
55	(United States)	Dominick Campione	Sophomore	D	5' 11" (1.8 m)	154 lb (70 kg)	2002-11-25	Kohler, Wisconsin	Brooks Bandits (AJHL)	—
59	(United States)	Alexander Tertyshny	Junior (RS)	D	6' 0" (1.83 m)	185 lb (84 kg)	2000-01-03	Philadelphia, Pennsylvania	American International (AHA)	—

== Standings ==
2024–25 NCAA Division I Independent ice hockey standings
	Overall record					
	GP	W	L	T	GF	GA
Alaska	32	12	14	6	73	87
Alaska Anchorage	34	6	23	5	75	117
Lindenwood	32	8	22	2	65	86
Long Island	34	20	12	2	111	77
Stonehill	34	12	22	0	76	106
Rankings: USCHO.com Top 20 Poll

== Schedule and results ==
Date	Time	Opponent^{#}	Rank^{#}	Site	TV	Decision	Result	Attendance	Record
Exhibition
October 5	1:00 pm	at New Hampshire*		Whittemore Center • Durham, New Hampshire (Exhibition)	ESPN+		L 1–4	3,139	
Regular Season
October 6	6:00 pm	at Merrimack*		J. Thom Lawler Rink • North Andover, Massachusetts	ESPN+	Androlewicz	W 3–2 ^{OT}	1,989	1–0–0
October 11	7:00 pm	Union*		Bridgewater Ice Arena • Bridgewater, Massachusetts	NEC Front Row	Lipskis	L 2–4	337	1–1–0
October 12	7:00 pm	at #18 Northeastern*		Matthews Arena • Boston, Massachusetts	ESPN+	Androlewicz	L 1–5	2,976	1–2–0
October 18	7:07 pm	at Lake Superior State*		Taffy Abel Arena • Sault Ste. Marie, Michigan	Midco Sports+	Androlewicz	W 4–1	1,592	2–2–0
October 19	6:07 pm	at Lake Superior State*		Taffy Abel Arena • Sault Ste. Marie, Michigan	Midco Sports+	Androlewicz	L 0–3	1,838	2–3–0
October 25	8:07 pm	at Minnesota Duluth*		AMSOIL Arena • Duluth, Minnesota		Androlewicz	L 1–5	4,103	2–4–0
October 26	7:07 pm	at Minnesota Duluth*		AMSOIL Arena • Duluth, Minnesota		Lipskis	L 1–2	4,560	2–5–0
November 1	7:00 pm	St. Lawrence*		Bridgewater Ice Arena • Bridgewater, Massachusetts	NEC Front Row	Androlewicz	W 4–0	154	3–5–0
November 3	3:00 pm	at Dartmouth*		Thompson Arena • Hanover, New Hampshire	ESPN+	Lipskis	L 2–5	1,637	3–6–0
November 9	7:00 pm	at Clarkson*		Cheel Arena • Potsdam, New York	ESPN+	Androlewicz	L 3–6	2,658	3–7–0
November 12	7:00 pm	Merrimack*		Warrior Ice Arena • Brighton, Massachusetts	NEC Front Row	Androlewicz	W 4–3 ^{OT}	483	4–7–0
November 15	7:00 pm	Long Island*		Bridgewater Ice Arena • Bridgewater, Massachusetts	NEC Front Row	Androlewicz	L 1–5	120	4–8–0
November 16	7:00 pm	Long Island*		Bridgewater Ice Arena • Bridgewater, Massachusetts	NEC Front Row	Androlewicz	L 2–4	248	4–9–0
November 19	7:00 pm	at American International*		MassMutual Center • Springfield, Massachusetts	FloHockey	Lipskis	L 0–3	76	4–10–0
November 22	8:30 pm	at Lindenwood*		Centene Community Ice Center • St. Charles, Missouri		Androlewicz	L 0–5	607	4–11–0
November 23	4:30 pm	at Lindenwood*		Centene Community Ice Center • St. Charles, Missouri		Androlewicz	W 3–1	701	5–11–0
November 26	7:00 pm	Army*		Warrior Ice Arena • Brighton, Massachusetts	NEC Front Row	Androlewicz	W 3–1	378	6–11–0
December 4	7:00 pm	Alaska Anchorage*		Bridgewater Ice Arena • Bridgewater, Massachusetts	NEC Front Row	Androlewicz	L 1–4	143	6–12–0
December 7	7:00 pm	at #5 Maine*		Alfond Arena • Orono, Maine	ESPN+	Androlewicz	L 2–5	4,518	6–13–0
December 8	2:00 pm	at #5 Maine*		Alfond Arena • Orono, Maine	ESPN+	Androlewicz	L 2–4	4,468	6–14–0
December 13	7:30 pm	at Long Island*		Northwell Health Ice Center • East Meadow, New York	ESPN+	Androlewicz	L 1–3	400	6–15–0
December 14	7:30 pm	at Long Island*		Northwell Health Ice Center • East Meadow, New York	ESPN+	Androlewicz	L 1–6	400	6–16–0
January 3	7:00 pm	American International*		Bridgewater Ice Arena • Bridgewater, Massachusetts	NEC Front Row	Androlewicz	L 1–3	107	6–17–0
January 6	7:00 pm	at #20 Quinnipiac*		M&T Bank Arena • Hamden, Connecticut	ESPN+	Androlewicz	L 1–6	1,505	6–18–0
January 10	7:00 pm	Lindenwood*		Bridgewater Ice Arena • Bridgewater, Massachusetts	NEC Front Row	Lipskis	L 0–3	105	6–19–0
January 11	5:00 pm	Lindenwood*		Bridgewater Ice Arena • Bridgewater, Massachusetts	NEC Front Row	Androlewicz	W 3–2	138	7–19–0
January 18	6:00 pm	at #9 Massachusetts Lowell*		Tsongas Center • Lowell, Massachusetts	ESPN+	Androlewicz	W 3–2 ^{OT}	4,308	8–19–0
January 21	7:00 pm	Saint Anselm*		Bridgewater Ice Arena • Bridgewater, Massachusetts	NEC Front Row	Lipskis	W 7–0	156	9–19–0
January 26	2:00 pm	at Brown*		Meehan Auditorium • Providence, Rhode Island	ESPN+	Androlewicz	L 2–5	1,219	9–20–0
January 31	2:00 pm	at Long Island*		Northwell Health Ice Center • East Meadow, New York	ESPN+	Androlewicz	L 2–4	294	9–21–0
February 1	2:00 pm	at Long Island*		Northwell Health Ice Center • East Meadow, New York	ESPN+	Androlewicz	W 2–0	374	10–21–0
February 14	7:00 pm	Plymouth State*		Bridgewater Ice Arena • Bridgewater, Massachusetts	NEC Front Row	Androlewicz	W 11–0	206	11–21–0
February 21	7:00 pm	Long Island*		Bridgewater Ice Arena • Bridgewater, Massachusetts	NEC Front Row	Androlewicz	L 1–3	204	11–22–0
February 22	5:00 pm	Long Island*		Bridgewater Ice Arena • Bridgewater, Massachusetts	NEC Front Row	Androlewicz	W 2–1 ^{OT}	283	12–22–0
*Non-conference game. ^{#}Rankings from USCHO.com Poll. All times are in Eastern Time. Source:

== Scoring statistics ==
Name	Position	Games	Goals	Assists	Points	PIM
Anthony Galante	F	31	13	9	22	37
Henri Schreifels	F	33	6	12	18	25
Evan Orr	D	34	8	7	15	18
Dominick Campione	D	31	3	10	13	30
Teddy Lagerbäck	LW	19	6	6	12	4
Frank Ireland	F	34	6	6	12	26
J. J. Grainda	LW	33	5	6	11	15
Zachary Aben	C/LW	30	4	7	11	10
Brady Hunter	C	27	3	7	10	8
Charlie Banquier	D	31	2	8	10	26
Zach Nicolas	F	20	3	5	8	2
Joel Lehtinen	F	27	3	5	8	12
Cole Melady	F	29	3	4	7	14
Leo Chambers	C	33	2	5	7	10
Justin Gibson	D	32	1	6	7	0
Kyle Heath	F	21	2	4	6	2
Devlin O'Brien	LW	33	2	3	5	37
Cam Gaudette	D	33	1	4	5	21
Jake Cady	C	20	0	3	3	23
Hunter Hastings	F	16	1	1	2	4
Dean Schwenninger	C	16	0	2	2	10
Conor Ronayne	C	9	1	0	1	0
Devon Carlstrom	D	17	1	0	1	4
Alexander Tertyshny	D	9	0	1	1	7
Cam Mannion	D	20	0	1	1	2
Dylan Ghaemi	G	1	0	0	0	0
Jake LaRusso	F	1	0	0	0	0
Justin Barker	F	2	0	0	0	2
Riley Rosenthal	D	3	0	0	0	0
Ryan Davies	D	6	0	0	0	2
Linards Lipskis	G	8	0	0	0	0
Connor Androlewicz	G	29	0	0	0	0
Total			76	112	198	363

== Goaltending statistics ==
Name	Games	Minutes	Wins	Losses	Ties	Goals Against	Saves	Shut Outs	SV %	GAA
Linards Lipskis	10	397:59	1	5	0	19	186	1	.907	2.86
Connor Androlewicz	30	1641:30	11	17	0	85	761	2	.900	3.11
Empty Net	-	9:50	-	-	-	2	-	-	-	-
Total	34	2049:19	12	22	0	106	947	3	.899	3.10

== Rankings ==
Poll	Week																											
Poll	Pre	1	2	3	4	5	6	7	8	9	10	11	12	13	14	15	16	17	18	19	20	21	22	23	24	25	26	27 (Final)
USCHO.com	NR	NR	NR	NR	NR	NR	NR	NR	NR	NR	NR	NR	–	NR	NR	NR	NR	NR	NR	NR	NR	NR	NR	NR	NR	NR	–	NR
USA Hockey	NR	NR	NR	NR	NR	NR	NR	NR	NR	NR	NR	NR	–	NR	NR	NR	NR	NR	NR	NR	NR	NR	NR	NR	NR	NR	NR	NR

Note: USCHO did not release a poll in week 12 or 26.
Note: USA Hockey did not release a poll in week 12.
