= 2024–25 Lindenwood Lions men's ice hockey season =

- Conference: Independent
- Home ice: Centene Community Ice Center

Rankings
- USCHO: NR
- USA Hockey: NR

Record
- Overall: 8–22–2
- Home: 2–6–0
- Road: 6–16–2

Coaches and captains
- Head coach: Bill Muckalt
- Assistant coaches: Jack Combs; Benton Maass
- Captain(s): Artyom Borshyov; David Gagnon
- Alternate captain(s): Mitch Allard; Joe Prouty; Aiden Yakimchuk

The 2024–25 Lindenwood Lions men's ice hockey season was the 3rd season of varsity play for the program. The Lions represented Lindenwood University in the 2024–25 NCAA Division I men's ice hockey season, played their games at the Centene Community Ice Center and were coached by Bill Muckalt in his 1st season.

== Season ==
Lindenwood began its first season under Bill Muckalt by earning the first win over a ranked team in program history. While the team had posted decent offensive numbers in their first two varsity seasons, Lindenwood seemed to have finally figured out how to play defense, or at the very least keep the puck out of the net. The win was secured as much by the four goals scored as the penalty kill stopping four out of five badgers opportunities with Minnesota transfer Owen Bartoszkiewicz making 34 stops on the evening.

The Lions' defense would put up a solid effort throughout the season, ending the year with 86 goals allowed for an average of 2.69 per game. For comparison, in 2024 Lindenwood surrendered 121 goals against in just 28 games, an average of 4.32. Unfortunately, while the defense showed a marked improvement, the offense could not say the same. team co-captain Dave Gagnon was the only Lion to reach double digits in goals and/or hit the 20 point mark. He posted a respectable total of 28 points on the year but, with the club averaging just over 2 goals per game, that meant that Gagnon had a hand in more than 40% of Lindenwood's goals for the year. The team struggled mightily to score for most of the season and ended up with a very stark statistic at its conclusion. When Lindenwood scored 3 goals in a game they won, whenever they failed to reach that mark, they didn't. With Bartoszkiewicz' consistent goalkeeping throughout the year, the team was competitive in the vast majority of its games but the lack of offense prevented the Lions from capitalizing on their chances. Lindenwood lost eleven 1-goal decisions throughout the year, demonstrating that just a slight increase in offensive production could have completely changed the complexion of the year for the team.

== Departures ==
Player	Position	Nationality	Cause
Zach Aughe	Forward	United States	Graduation (retired)
Ethan Barwick	Goaltender	Canada	Transferred to Northern Michigan
Trent Burnham	Goaltender	United States	Transferred to RIT
Adam Conquest	Defenseman	United States	Graduation (retired)
Cade DeStefani	Forward	United States	Transferred to Salve Regina
Kabore Dunn	Forward	Canada	Graduation (signed with Utah Grizzlies)
Austin Fraser	Forward	Canada	Transferred to Simon Fraser
Kyle Jeffers	Forward	United States	Graduation (signed with Savannah Ghost Pirates)
Adam Johnson	Goaltender	United States	Left program (retired)
Shane LaVelle	Forward	United States	Transferred to Bethel
Caleb Price	Defenseman	United States	Transferred to Mercyhurst
Brenden Rons	Defenseman	United States	Graduation (signed with Rapid City Rush)
Kieran Ruscheinski	Defenseman	Canada	Transferred to Waterloo
Caige Sterzer	Forward	Canada	Transferred to St. Thomas
Matthew Syverson	Goaltender	United States	Transferred to Minnesota State
Cole Teleki	Defenseman	United States	Transferred to Wisconsin-River Falls

== Recruiting ==
Player	Position	Nationality	Age	Notes
Alexandros Aslanidis	Goaltender	United States	23	Moorestown, NJ; graduate transfer from American International
Owen Bartoszkiewicz	Goaltender	United States	21	Northville, MI; transfer from Minnesota
Artyom Borshyov	Defenseman	Belarus	24	Vitebsk, BLR; graduate transfer from Lake Superior State
John Evans	Forward	Canada	22	South Surrey, BC; transfer from Renssealer
Ryan Forberg	Forward	Canada	21	Thornhill, ON
Henry Graham	Goaltender	United States	24	Manhattan, NY; graduate transfer from Boston University
Ty Hipkin	Forward	Canada	21	High River, AB
Noah Houle	Defenseman	Canada	20	Montreal, QC
Thomas Jarman	Defenseman	United States	23	Pittsburgh, PA; graduate transfer from Boston University
Tyler Loughman	Forward	United States	20	St. Louis, MO
Alexander Lundman	Forward	Sweden	23	Norrköping, SWE; transfer from Bemidji State
Brody Mortensen	Defenseman	Canada	20	Humboldt, SK
Kristóf Papp	Forward	Hungary	23	Budapest, HUN; graduate transfer from Northern Michigan
Shawn Ramsey	Defenseman	Canada	20	Mississauga, ON
Adam Raesler	Forward	Canada	21	Edmonton, AB
Colin Ronan	Goaltender	United States	21	Saugus, MA
Jacob Vockler	Forward	United States	21	Sioux Falls, SD
Brady Yakesh	Defenseman	United States	21	Delano, MN

== Roster ==
As of August 21, 2024.

No.	Nat.	Player	Class	Pos	Height	Weight	DoB	Hometown	Previous team	NHL rights
1	(United States)	Alexandros Aslanidis	Graduate	G	6' 5" (1.96 m)	205 lb (93 kg)	2001-01-20	Moorestown, New Jersey	American International (AHA)	—
2	(Belarus)	Artyom Borshyov (C)	Graduate	D	6' 3" (1.91 m)	210 lb (95 kg)	2000-08-22	Vitebsk, Belarus	Lake Superior State (CCHA)	—
3	(Canada)	Noah Houle	Freshman	D	6' 1" (1.85 m)	192 lb (87 kg)	2003-11-16	Montreal, Quebec	Flin Flon Bombers (SJHL)	—
4	(Canada)	Shawn Ramsey	Freshman	D	5' 11" (1.8 m)	179 lb (81 kg)	2004-03-18	Mississauga, Ontario	Madison Capitols (USHL)	—
5	(Canada)	Aiden Yakimchuk (A)	Senior	D	6' 4" (1.93 m)	200 lb (91 kg)	2000-05-14	St. Albert, Alberta	Drumheller Dragons (AJHL)	—
7	(United States)	Brady Yakesh	Freshman	D	5' 9" (1.75 m)	179 lb (81 kg)	2003-09-15	Delano, Minnesota	Cowichan Valley Capitals (BCHL)	—
8	(United States)	Thomas Jarman	Graduate	D	6' 3" (1.91 m)	190 lb (86 kg)	2001-04-09	Gibsonia, Pennsylvania	Boston University (HEA)	—
9	(Canada)	Drew Kuzma	Junior	F	6' 6" (1.98 m)	210 lb (95 kg)	2002-11-13	St. Albert, Alberta	Flin Flon Bombers (SJHL)	—
10	(United States)	Mitch Allard (A)	Senior	F	6' 1" (1.85 m)	205 lb (93 kg)	2000-01-27	Shelby Township, Michigan	Minnesota Wilderness (NAHL)	—
11	(Canada)	Jaeden Mercier	Sophomore	F	5' 11" (1.8 m)	170 lb (77 kg)	2002-02-12	Saskatoon, Saskatchewan	Flin Flon Bombers (SJHL)	—
12	(Canada)	Ethan Zielke	Sophomore	D	5' 10" (1.78 m)	180 lb (82 kg)	2003-08-03	Calgary, Alberta	Humboldt Broncos (SJHL)	—
13	(Canada)	Adam Raesler	Freshman	F	6' 0" (1.83 m)	165 lb (75 kg)	2003-06-23	Edmonton, Alberta	Sherwood Park Crusaders (BCHL)	—
14	(United States)	Coltan Wilkie	Junior	D	5' 8" (1.73 m)	180 lb (82 kg)	2000-04-03	Gretna, Nebraska	Okotoks Oilers (AJHL)	—
15	(United States)	Joe Prouty (A)	Junior	D	6' 0" (1.83 m)	180 lb (82 kg)	2001-11-29	Burnsville, Minnesota	New Mexico Ice Wolves (NAHL)	—
16	(Canada)	Ty Hipkin	Freshman	F	5' 11" (1.8 m)	181 lb (82 kg)	2000-03-31	High River, Alberta	Calgary Canucks (AJHL)	—
17	(United States)	Patrick Schmiedlin	Sophomore	F	6' 1" (1.85 m)	185 lb (84 kg)	2002-03-20	Culver, Indiana	Maine Nordiques (NAHL)	—
18	(United States)	Jack Anderson	Junior	D	6' 6" (1.98 m)	225 lb (102 kg)	2002-11-14	St. Louis, Missouri	El Paso Rhinos (NAHL)	—
19	(Sweden)	Alexander Lundman	Senior	F	6' 1" (1.85 m)	187 lb (85 kg)	2001-06-17	Norrköping, Sweden	Bemidji State (CCHA)	—
21	(Canada)	Jake Southgate	Sophomore	F	5' 11" (1.8 m)	185 lb (84 kg)	2002-11-04	North Battleford, Saskatchewan	Battlefords North Stars (SJHL)	—
22	(United States)	Jacob Vockler	Freshman	F	6' 0" (1.83 m)	161 lb (73 kg)	2003-02-09	Sioux Falls, South Dakota	Flin Flon Bombers (SJHL)	—
23	(Hungary)	Kristóf Papp	Graduate	F	5' 11" (1.8 m)	176 lb (80 kg)	2001-06-27	Budapest, Hungary	Northern Michigan (CCHA)	—
24	(Canada)	John Evans	Junior	F	5' 10" (1.78 m)	150 lb (68 kg)	2002-04-08	South Surrey, British Columbia	Rensselaer (ECAC)	—
25	(Canada)	Ryan Forberg	Freshman	F	6' 0" (1.83 m)	190 lb (86 kg)	2003-02-11	Thornhill, Ontario	Markham Royals (OJHL)	—
26	(United States)	Tyler Loughman	Freshman	F	5' 11" (1.8 m)	174 lb (79 kg)	2003-11-04	St. Louis, Missouri	Canmore Eagles (AJHL)	—
27	(Canada)	David Gagnon (C)	Senior	F	6' 1" (1.85 m)	190 lb (86 kg)	2000-04-19	Halifax, Nova Scotia	Truro Bearcats (MHL)	—
28	(Canada)	Brody Mortensen	Freshman	D	6' 1" (1.85 m)	185 lb (84 kg)	2004-09-07	Humboldt, Saskatchewan	Canmore Eagles (AJHL)	—
29	(United States)	Colin Ronan	Freshman	G	6' 2" (1.88 m)	190 lb (86 kg)	2003-06-06	Saugus, Massachusetts	Maryland Black Bears (NAHL)	—
30	(United States)	Henry Graham	Graduate	G	6' 0" (1.83 m)	181 lb (82 kg)	2000-07-25	Manhattan, New York	Boston University (HEA)	—
31	(United States)	Owen Bartoszkiewicz	Sophomore	G	6' 1" (1.85 m)	195 lb (88 kg)	2003-03-11	Northville, Michigan	Oklahoma Warriors (USHL)	—

== Standings ==
2024–25 NCAA Division I Independent ice hockey standings
	Overall record					
	GP	W	L	T	GF	GA
Alaska	32	12	14	6	73	87
Alaska Anchorage	34	6	23	5	75	117
Lindenwood	32	8	22	2	65	86
Long Island	34	20	12	2	111	77
Stonehill	34	12	22	0	76	106
Rankings: USCHO.com Top 20 Poll

== Schedule and results ==
Date	Time	Opponent^{#}	Rank^{#}	Site	TV	Decision	Result	Attendance	Record
Exhibition
October 5	1:40 pm	UNLV*		Centene Community Ice Center • St. Charles, Missouri (Exhibition)		Bartoszkiewicz	W 5–1		
October 6	7:07 pm	UNLV*		Centene Community Ice Center • St. Charles, Missouri (Exhibition)			W 6–3		
Regular Season
October 11	7:00 pm	at #9 Wisconsin*		Kohl Center • Madison, Wisconsin	BTN+	Bartoszkiewicz	W 4–2	7,537	1–0–0
October 12	6:00 pm	at #9 Wisconsin*		Kohl Center • Madison, Wisconsin	BTN+	Bartoszkiewicz	L 2–3 ^{OT}	8,857	1–1–0
October 18	8:05 pm	at Air Force*		Cadet Ice Arena • Colorado Springs, Colorado	FloHockey	Bartoszkiewicz	L 2–3	1,596	1–2–0
October 20	4:35 pm	at Air Force*		Cadet Ice Arena • Colorado Springs, Colorado	FloHockey	Bartoszkiewicz	L 1–2	1,351	1–3–0
October 25	6:05 pm	at Miami*		Steve Cady Arena • Oxford, Ohio		Bartoszkiewicz	W 4–2	2,021	2–3–0
October 26	6:05 pm	at Miami*		Steve Cady Arena • Oxford, Ohio		Bartoszkiewicz	L 1–4	1,804	2–4–0
November 1	6:00 pm	at Robert Morris*		Clearview Arena • Neville Township, Pennsylvania	FloHockey, SNP	Bartoszkiewicz	L 0–3	325	2–5–0
November 2	6:00 pm	at Robert Morris*		Clearview Arena • Neville Township, Pennsylvania	FloHockey	Aslanidis	T 2–2 ^{OT}	587	2–5–1
November 8	8:00 pm	at #1 Denver*		Magness Arena • Denver, Colorado		Bartoszkiewicz	L 1–4	6,369	2–6–1
November 9	8:00 pm	at #1 Denver*		Magness Arena • Denver, Colorado		Bartoszkiewicz	L 1–4	6,582	2–7–1
November 15	7:10 pm	#14 Ohio State*		Centene Community Ice Center • St. Charles, Missouri		Bartoszkiewicz	L 2–5	2,067	2–8–1
November 16	2:10 pm	#14 Ohio State*		Centene Community Ice Center • St. Charles, Missouri		Graham	L 2–3	1,705	2–9–1
November 22	7:30 pm	Stonehill*		Centene Community Ice Center • St. Charles, Missouri		Bartoszkiewicz	W 5–0	607	3–9–1
November 23	4:30 pm	Stonehill*		Centene Community Ice Center • St. Charles, Missouri		Bartoszkiewicz	L 1–3	701	3–10–1
November 29	6:00 pm	at #1 Michigan State*		Munn Ice Arena • East Lansing, Michigan	BTN+	Bartoszkiewicz	L 0–4	6,555	3–11–1
December 1	3:00 pm	at #1 Michigan State*		Munn Ice Arena • East Lansing, Michigan	BTN+	Bartoszkiewicz	L 0–2	6,555	3–12–1
December 13	7:07 pm	at Omaha*		Baxter Arena • Omaha, Nebraska		Bartoszkiewicz	W 3–2	3,225	4–12–1
December 14	7:07 pm	at Omaha*		Baxter Arena • Omaha, Nebraska		Bartoszkiewicz	L 1–2	6,159	4–13–1
January 3	7:30 pm	St. Thomas*		Centene Community Ice Center • St. Charles, Missouri		Bartoszkiewicz	L 2–3 ^{OT}	627	4–14–1
January 4	4:30 pm	St. Thomas*		Centene Community Ice Center • St. Charles, Missouri		Bartoszkiewicz	L 2–4	597	4–15–1
January 10	7:00 pm	at Stonehill*		Bridgewater Ice Arena • Bridgewater, Massachusetts	NEC Front Row	Bartoszkiewicz	W 3–0	105	5–15–1
January 11	5:00 pm	at Stonehill*		Bridgewater Ice Arena • Bridgewater, Massachusetts	NEC Front Row	Graham	L 2–3	138	5–16–1
January 17	7:07 pm	at Augustana*		Midco Arena • Sioux Falls, South Dakota	Midco Sports+	Bartoszkiewicz	L 2–3	2,845	5–17–1
January 18	6:07 pm	at Augustana*		Midco Arena • Sioux Falls, South Dakota	Midco Sports+	Bartoszkiewicz	T 1–1 ^{OT}	2,932	5–17–2
January 24	6:00 pm	at Notre Dame*		Compton Family Ice Arena • Notre Dame, Indiana	Peacock	Bartoszkiewicz	W 3–2	5,169	6–17–2
January 25	5:00 pm	at Notre Dame*		Compton Family Ice Arena • Notre Dame, Indiana	Peacock	Bartoszkiewicz	L 2–4	5,125	6–18–2
January 31	7:10 pm	Simon Fraser*		Centene Community Ice Center • St. Charles, Missouri (Exhibition)		Bartoszkiewicz	W 5–1	765	
February 1	2:10 pm	Simon Fraser*		Centene Community Ice Center • St. Charles, Missouri (Exhibition)		Graham	W 7–4	761	
February 6	6:45 pm	at Long Island*		Northwell Health Ice Center • East Meadow, New York	ESPN+	Bartoszkiewicz	L 2–4	267	6–19–2
February 7	6:30 pm	at Long Island*		Northwell Health Ice Center • East Meadow, New York	ESPN+	Bartoszkiewicz	L 2–3	236	6–20–2
February 14	7:10 pm	Alaska*		Centene Community Ice Center • St. Charles, Missouri		Bartoszkiewicz	L 1–2	1,427	6–21–2
February 15	2:10 pm	Alaska*		Centene Community Ice Center • St. Charles, Missouri		Bartoszkiewicz	W 5–2	1,133	7–21–2
February 21	10:07 pm	at Alaska Anchorage*		Avis Alaska Sports Complex • Anchorage, Alaska		Bartoszkiewicz	W 6–4	669	8–21–2
February 22	10:07 pm	at Alaska Anchorage*		Avis Alaska Sports Complex • Anchorage, Alaska		Bartoszkiewicz	L 0–1	533	8–22–2
*Non-conference game. ^{#}Rankings from USCHO.com Poll. All times are in Central Time. Source:

== Scoring statistics ==
Name	Position	Games	Goals	Assists	Points	PIM
David Gagnon	LW	32	11	17	28	23
Noah Houle	D	32	4	12	16	26
Jake Southgate	C	30	5	7	12	10
John Evans	F	28	4	8	12	6
Jaeden Mercier	F	30	8	3	11	4
Kristóf Papp	C	29	4	7	11	2
Tyler Loughman	F	28	4	6	10	4
Jack Anderson	D	32	1	9	10	14
Patrick Schmiedlin	C	14	5	4	9	4
Ty Hipkin	F	29	4	3	7	14
Ethan Zielke	F	30	4	3	7	12
Drew Kuzma	F	32	2	4	6	19
Brody Mortensen	D	24	3	2	5	10
Mitch Allard	LW	32	1	4	5	33
Brady Yakesh	D	27	0	5	5	16
Artyom Borshyov	D	32	2	2	4	14
Joe Prouty	D	32	1	3	4	24
Alexander Lundman	LW/RW	17	2	1	3	6
Thomas Jarman	D	8	0	2	2	2
Ryan Forberg	C/RW	9	0	2	2	2
Coltan Wilkie	D/F	6	0	1	1	0
Jacob Vockler	F	19	0	1	1	4
Aiden Yakimchuk	D	32	0	1	1	4
Alexandros Aslanidis	G	1	0	0	0	0
Henry Graham	G	2	0	0	0	0
Adam Raesler	F	7	0	0	0	4
Shawn Ramsey	D	18	0	0	0	10
Owen Bartoszkiewicz	G	29	0	0	0	4
Total			65	107	172	283

== Goaltending statistics ==
Name	Games	Minutes	Wins	Losses	Ties	Goals Against	Saves	Shut Outs	SV %	GAA
Alexandros Aslanidis	1	65:00	0	0	1	2	19	0	.905	1.85
Owen Bartoszkiewicz	29	1729:12	8	20	1	74	845	2	.919	2.57
Henry Graham	2	117:28	0	2	0	6	42	0	.875	3.06
Empty Net	-	26:12	-	-	-	4	-	-	-	-
Total	32	1937:52	8	22	2	86	906	2	.906	2.66

== Rankings ==
Poll	Week																											
Poll	Pre	1	2	3	4	5	6	7	8	9	10	11	12	13	14	15	16	17	18	19	20	21	22	23	24	25	26	27 (Final)
USCHO.com	NR	NR	NR	NR	NR	NR	NR	NR	NR	NR	NR	NR	–	NR	NR	NR	NR	NR	NR	NR	NR	NR	NR	NR	NR	NR	–	NR
USA Hockey	NR	NR	NR	NR	NR	NR	NR	NR	NR	NR	NR	NR	–	NR	NR	NR	NR	NR	NR	NR	NR	NR	NR	NR	NR	NR	NR	NR

Note: USCHO did not release a poll in week 12 or 26.
Note: USA Hockey did not release a poll in week 12.
