= 2023–24 Lindenwood Lions men's ice hockey season =

- Conference: Independent
- Home ice: Centene Community Ice Center

Rankings
- USCHO: NR
- USA Hockey: NR

Record
- Overall: 6–18–4
- Home: 4–6–0
- Road: 2–12–4

Coaches and captains
- Head coach: Rick Zombo
- Assistant coaches: Jason Power; Jack Combs; Kyle Diamond
- Captains: Mitch Allard; Joe Prouty; Aiden Yakimchuk

The 2023–24 Lindenwood Lions men's ice hockey season was the 2nd season of varsity play for the program. The Lions represented Lindenwood University and were coached by Rick Zombo in his 14th season.

== Season ==
Lindenwood got off to a decent start, earning a road split with Air Force and then holding #14 Ohio State to a tie in their first two weeks. Afterwards, however, the Lions offense struggled to get on track. Over a three month span, from mid-October to mid-January, Lindenwood was able to score at least 3 goals in just four of fourteen games. With the defense still not quite up to Division I standards, that left the Lions uncompetitive in most of their games. While the team was able to get a fairly surprising tie against tournament-bound Wisconsin, the only wins the Lions could earn in the second half of the season came against Stonehill, the worst time in college hockey. To make matters worse, Lindenwood was on the wrong side of the ledger in the last game against the Skyhawks, giving Stonehill their only D-I win on the year.

After the disappointing season, Lindenwood announced that head coach Rick Zombo would not be returning and they immediately began a search for his replacement.

== Departures ==
| Player | Position | Nationality | Cause |
|---|---|---|---|
| Adisen Brueck | Forward | United States | Left program (retired) |
| Ryan Finnegan | Forward | United States | Graduation (signed with Reading Royals) |
| Hunter Johannes | Forward | United States | Graduate transfer to North Dakota |
| Mason Kruger | Defenseman | United States | Left program (retired) |
| Matt Ladd | Goaltender | United States | Graduation (retired) |
| Max Neill | Forward | Canada | Left program (retired) |
| Roni Salmenkangas | Goaltender | Finland | Graduation (retired) |
| Sam Watson | Forward | United States | Left program (retired) |
| Andy Willis | Forward | United States | Graduation (signed with Fort Wayne Komets) |
| Jackson Wozniak | Forward | Canada | Left program (retired) |

== Recruiting ==
| Player | Position | Nationality | Age | Notes |
|---|---|---|---|---|
| Ethan Barwick | Goaltender | Canada | 21 | St. Albert, AB |
| Austin Fraser | Forward | Canada | 20 | West Vancouver, BC |
| Adam Johnson | Goaltender | United States | 20 | Chicago, IL |
| Jaeden Mercier | Forward | Canada | 21 | Saskatoon, SK |
| Brenden Rons | Defenseman | United States | 25 | Farmington Hills, MI; graduate transfer from Ferris State |
| Patrick Schmiedlin | Forward | United States | 21 | Culver, IN |
| Jake Southgate | Forward | Canada | 20 | North Battleford, SK |
| Jake Southgate | Forward | Canada | 20 | North Battleford, SK |
| Matthew Syverson | Goaltender | United States | 20 | Apple Valley, MN |
| Ethan Zielke | Forward | Canada | 20 | Calgary, AB |

== Roster ==
As of September 20, 2023.

| No. | Nat. | Player | Class | Pos | Height | Weight | DoB | Hometown | Previous team | NHL rights |
|---|---|---|---|---|---|---|---|---|---|---|
| 1 | (United States) | Trent Burnham | Junior | G | 6' 0" (1.83 m) | 160 lb (73 kg) | 2000-03-27 | Eagle River, Alaska | Sioux Falls Stampede (USHL) | — |
| 2 | (United States) | Cole Teleki | Freshman | D | 6' 2" (1.88 m) | 194 lb (88 kg) | 2000-03-27 | Dallas, Texas | Oklahoma Warriors (NAHL) | — |
| 3 | (Canada) | Kieran Ruscheinski | Sophomore | D | 6' 6" (1.98 m) | 210 lb (95 kg) | 2001-03-05 | Calgary, Alberta | Salmon Arm Silverbacks (BCHL) | MTL, 206th overall 2019 |
| 5 | (Canada) | Aiden Yakimchuk (C) | Junior | D | 6' 4" (1.93 m) | 200 lb (91 kg) | 2000-05-14 | St. Albert, Alberta | Drumheller Dragons (AJHL) | — |
| 6 | (United States) | Cade DeStefani | Sophomore | F | 6' 2" (1.88 m) | 185 lb (84 kg) | 2001-06-21 | Bedford, New Hampshire | Janesville Jets (NAHL) | — |
| 8 | (United States) | Kyle Jeffers | Junior | F | 5' 10" (1.78 m) | 165 lb (75 kg) | 1999-01-06 | Oviedo, Florida | American International (AHA) | — |
| 9 | (Canada) | Drew Kuzma | Sophomore | F | 6' 6" (1.98 m) | 210 lb (95 kg) | 2002-11-13 | St. Albert, Alberta | Flin Flon Bombers (SJHL) | — |
| 10 | (United States) | Mitch Allard (C) | Junior | F | 6' 1" (1.85 m) | 205 lb (93 kg) | 2000-01-27 | Shelby Township, Michigan | Minnesota Wilderness (NAHL) | — |
| 11 | (Canada) | Jaeden Mercier | Freshman | F | 5' 11" (1.8 m) | 170 lb (77 kg) | 2002-02-12 | Saskatoon, Saskatchewan | Flin Flon Bombers (SJHL) | — |
| 12 | (Canada) | Ethan Zielke | Freshman | D | 5' 10" (1.78 m) | 180 lb (82 kg) | 2003-08-03 | Calgary, Alberta | Humboldt Broncos (SJHL) | — |
| 13 | (United States) | Zach Aughe | Senior | F | 6' 3" (1.91 m) | 205 lb (93 kg) | 2000-02-18 | Clarkston, Michigan | Maine (HEA) | — |
| 14 | (United States) | Coltan Wilkie | Sophomore | D | 5' 8" (1.73 m) | 180 lb (82 kg) | 2000-04-03 | Gretna, Nebraska | Okotoks Oilers (AJHL) | — |
| 15 | (United States) | Joe Prouty (C) | Sophomore | D | 6' 0" (1.83 m) | 180 lb (82 kg) | 2001-11-29 | Burnsville, Minnesota | New Mexico Ice Wolves (NAHL) | — |
| 16 | (United States) | Caleb Price | Junior | D | 5' 10" (1.78 m) | 170 lb (77 kg) | 2000-03-31 | Hooksett, New Hampshire | New Jersey Titans (NAHL) | — |
| 17 | (United States) | Patrick Schmiedlin | Freshman | F | 6' 1" (1.85 m) | 185 lb (84 kg) | 2002-03-20 | Culver, Indiana | Maine Nordiques (NAHL) | — |
| 18 | (United States) | Jack Anderson | Sophomore | D | 6' 6" (1.98 m) | 225 lb (102 kg) | 2002-11-14 | St. Louis, Missouri | El Paso Rhinos (NAHL) | — |
| 19 | (Canada) | Caige Sterzer | Junior | F | 6' 5" (1.96 m) | 215 lb (98 kg) | 2000-08-08 | Kimberley, British Columbia | Lone Star Brahmas (NAHL) | — |
| 21 | (Canada) | Jake Southgate | Freshman | F | 5' 11" (1.8 m) | 185 lb (84 kg) | 2002-11-04 | North Battleford, Saskatchewan | Battlefords North Stars (SJHL) | — |
| 22 | (United States) | Brenden Rons | Graduate | D | 6' 6" (1.98 m) | 226 lb (103 kg) | 1998-03-03 | Farmington Hills, Michigan | Ferris State (CCHA) | — |
| 23 | (United States) | Shane LaVelle | Sophomore | F | 6' 1" (1.85 m) | 185 lb (84 kg) | 2001-08-16 | Chaska, Minnesota | Cowichan Valley Capitals (BCHL) | — |
| 24 | (United States) | Adam Conquest | Graduate | F | 6' 0" (1.83 m) | 190 lb (86 kg) | 2000-05-10 | Brighton, Michigan | Bowling Green (CCHA) | — |
| 25 | (Canada) | Austin Fraser | Freshman | F | 6' 2" (1.88 m) | 205 lb (93 kg) | 2000-08-24 | West Vancouver, British Columbia | Prince George Spruce Kings (BCHL) | — |
| 27 | (Canada) | David Gagnon | Junior | F | 6' 1" (1.85 m) | 190 lb (86 kg) | 2000-04-19 | Halifax, Nova Scotia | Truro Bearcats (MHL) | — |
| 28 | (Canada) | Kabore Dunn | Sophomore | D | 6' 2" (1.88 m) | 185 lb (84 kg) | 2001-11-10 | Mill Bay, British Columbia | Trail Smoke Eaters (BCHL) | — |
| 29 | (Canada) | Ethan Barwick | Freshman | G | 6' 3" (1.91 m) | 187 lb (85 kg) | 2002-05-17 | St. Albert, Alberta | Brooks Bandits (AJHL) | — |
| 30 | (United States) | Adam Johnson | Freshman | G | 6' 3" (1.91 m) | 185 lb (84 kg) | 2002-10-15 | Chicago, Illinois | Johnstown Tomahawks (NAHL) | — |
| 31 | (United States) | Matthew Syverson | Freshman | G | 6' 4" (1.93 m) | 185 lb (84 kg) | 2003-04-22 | Apple Valley, Minnesota | Lloydminster Bobcats (AJHL) | — |

== Standings ==
2023–24 NCAA Division I Independent ice hockey standings
| | Overall record | | | | | |
| | GP | W | L | T | GF | GA |
|---|---|---|---|---|---|---|
| Alaska | 34 | 17 | 14 | 3 | 110 | 86 |
| Alaska Anchorage | 34 | 15 | 17 | 2 | 95 | 105 |
| Arizona State | 38 | 24 | 8 | 6 | 129 | 94 |
| Lindenwood | 28 | 6 | 18 | 4 | 74 | 121 |
| Long Island | 37 | 16 | 20 | 1 | 115 | 103 |
| Stonehill | 36 | 2 | 34 | 0 | 62 | 213 |
Rankings: USCHO.com Top 20 Poll

== Schedule and results ==
| Date | Time | Opponent^{#} | Rank^{#} | Site | TV | Decision | Result | Attendance | Record |
Regular Season
| October 7 | 6:05 pm | at Air Force* | | Cadet Ice Arena • Colorado Springs, Colorado | FloHockey | Burnham | L 1–4 | 1,659 | 0–1–0 |
| October 8 | 6:05 pm | at Air Force* | | Cadet Ice Arena • Colorado Springs, Colorado | FloHockey | Burnham | W 4–3 | 1,333 | 1–1–0 |
| October 13 | 6:00 pm | at #14 Ohio State* | | Value City Arena • Columbus, Ohio | | Burnham | L 2–4 | 2,853 | 1–2–0 |
| October 14 | 4:00 pm | at #14 Ohio State* | | Value City Arena • Columbus, Ohio | | Burnham | T 2–2 ^{OT} | 2,901 | 1–2–1 |
| October 20 | 7:07 pm | at St. Thomas* | | St. Thomas Ice Arena • Mendota Heights, Minnesota | FloHockey | Burnham | T 4–4 ^{OT} | 778 | 1–2–2 |
| October 21 | 6:07 pm | at St. Thomas* | | St. Thomas Ice Arena • Mendota Heights, Minnesota | FloHockey | Burnham | L 1–3 | 668 | 1–3–2 |
| October 27 | 6:00 pm | at #6 Michigan* | | Yost Ice Arena • Ann Arbor, Michigan | | Burnham | L 1–9 | 5,800 | 1–4–2 |
| October 28 | 6:00 pm | at #6 Michigan* | | Yost Ice Arena • Ann Arbor, Michigan | | Burnham | L 1–10 | 5,800 | 1–5–2 |
| November 10 | 7:10 pm | Augustana* | | Centene Community Ice Center • St. Charles, Missouri | | Burnham | L 3–4 ^{OT} | 1,607 | 1–6–2 |
| November 11 | 7:10 pm | Augustana* | | Centene Community Ice Center • St. Charles, Missouri | | Burnham | W 5–3 | — | 2–6–2 |
| November 17 | 7:10 pm | Long Island* | | Centene Community Ice Center • St. Charles, Missouri | | Burnham | W 3–0 | 857 | 3–6–2 |
| November 18 | 2:10 pm | Long Island* | | Centene Community Ice Center • St. Charles, Missouri | | Burnham | L 2–6 | 635 | 3–7–2 |
| November 24 | 3:00 pm | at #19 Penn State* | | Pegula Ice Arena • University Park, Pennsylvania | | Burnham | L 3–9 | 5,641 | 3–8–2 |
| November 25 | 3:00 pm | at #19 Penn State* | | Pegula Ice Arena • University Park, Pennsylvania | | Syverson | L 1–7 | 5,802 | 3–9–2 |
| December 1 | 6:00 pm | at #14 Western Michigan* | | Lawson Arena • Kalamazoo, Michigan | | Burnham | L 1–3 | 2,733 | 3–10–2 |
| December 2 | 5:00 pm | at #14 Western Michigan* | | Lawson Arena • Kalamazoo, Michigan | | Burnham | L 1–5 | 2,982 | 3–11–2 |
| January 5 | 7:10 pm | #11 Western Michigan* | | Centene Community Ice Center • St. Charles, Missouri | | Burnham | L 2–3 | 1,261 | 3–12–2 |
| January 6 | 2:10 pm | #11 Western Michigan* | | Centene Community Ice Center • St. Charles, Missouri | | Burnham | L 1–6 | 907 | 3–13–2 |
| January 12 | 7:00 pm | at #3 Wisconsin* | | Kohl Center • Madison, Wisconsin | BTN+ | Burnham | L 0–5 | 7,775 | 3–14–2 |
| January 13 | 7:00 pm | at #3 Wisconsin* | | Kohl Center • Madison, Wisconsin | BTN+ | Burnham | T 3–3 ^{OT} | 9,379 | 3–14–3 |
| January 26 | 7:10 pm | Stonehill* | | Centene Community Ice Center • St. Charles, Missouri | | Burnham | W 7–1 | 821 | 4–14–3 |
| January 27 | 2:10 pm | Stonehill* | | Centene Community Ice Center • St. Charles, Missouri | | Burnham | W 6–5 ^{OT} | 672 | 5–14–3 |
| February 2 | 8:00 pm | at #17 Arizona State* | | Mullett Arena • Tempe, Arizona | | Burnham | T 4–4 ^{OT} | 4,829 | 5–14–4 |
| February 3 | 8:00 pm | at #17 Arizona State* | | Mullett Arena • Tempe, Arizona | | Burnham | L 1–5 | 4,789 | 5–15–4 |
| February 9 | 6:00 pm | at Stonehill* | | Bridgewater Ice Arena • Bridgewater, Massachusetts | NEC Front Row | Burnham | W 10–1 | 113 | 6–15–4 |
| February 10 | 4:00 pm | at Stonehill* | | Bridgewater Ice Arena • Bridgewater, Massachusetts | NEC Front Row | Burnham | L 2–4 | 178 | 6–16–4 |
| February 16 | 7:10 pm | at Alaska Anchorage* | | Centene Community Ice Center • St. Charles, Missouri | | Burnham | L 3–5 | 919 | 6–17–4 |
| February 17 | 6:00 pm | at Alaska Anchorage* | | Centene Community Ice Center • St. Charles, Missouri | | Burnham | L 0–3 | 1,012 | 6–18–4 |
*Non-conference game. ^{#}Rankings from USCHO.com Poll. All times are in Central Time. Source:

== Scoring statistics ==
| Name | Position | Games | Goals | Assists | Points | PIM |
|---|---|---|---|---|---|---|
| Caige Sterzer | F | 28 | 8 | 14 | 22 | 35 |
| Kyle Jeffers | F | 26 | 9 | 8 | 17 | 4 |
| David Gagnon | LW | 28 | 8 | 8 | 16 | 25 |
| Jake Southgate | C | 28 | 7 | 9 | 16 | 6 |
| Ethan Zielke | F | 28 | 7 | 8 | 15 | 18 |
| Jaeden Mercier | F | 28 | 3 | 8 | 11 | 6 |
| Kabore Dunn | D | 22 | 0 | 11 | 11 | 20 |
| Aiden Yakimchuk | D | 16 | 5 | 5 | 10 | 6 |
| Drew Kuzma | F | 25 | 4 | 6 | 10 | 43 |
| Caleb Price | D | 27 | 4 | 6 | 10 | 6 |
| Zachary Aughe | C | 28 | 3 | 7 | 10 | 39 |
| Adam Conquest | RW | 27 | 3 | 5 | 8 | 28 |
| Mitch Allard | LW | 27 | 3 | 4 | 7 | 39 |
| Joe Prouty | D | 28 | 0 | 6 | 6 | 75 |
| Patrick Schmiedlin | C | 24 | 2 | 3 | 5 | 4 |
| Jack Anderson | D | 28 | 1 | 4 | 5 | 40 |
| Cade DeStefani | C | 9 | 2 | 2 | 4 | 6 |
| Austin Fraser | F | 24 | 2 | 2 | 4 | 30 |
| Kieran Ruscheinski | D | 17 | 1 | 3 | 4 | 15 |
| Coltan Wilkie | D | 17 | 1 | 3 | 4 | 24 |
| Brenden Rons | D | 27 | 0 | 3 | 3 | 18 |
| Shane Lavell | F | 7 | 1 | 0 | 1 | 2 |
| Matthew Syverson | G | 7 | 0 | 0 | 0 | 0 |
| Trent Burnham | G | 27 | 0 | 0 | 0 | 2 |
| Total | | | 74 | 125 | 199 | 491 |

== Goaltending statistics ==
| Name | Games | Minutes | Wins | Losses | Ties | Goals Against | Saves | Shut Outs | SV % | GAA |
|---|---|---|---|---|---|---|---|---|---|---|
| Trent Burnham | 27 | 1532:37 | 6 | 17 | 4 | 100 | 958 | 1 | .905 | 3.91 |
| Matthew Syverson | 7 | 167:17 | 0 | 1 | 0 | 17 | 99 | 0 | .853 | 6.10 |
| Empty Net | - | 5:51 | - | - | - | 4 | - | - | - | - |
| Total | 28 | 1705:45 | 6 | 18 | 4 | 121 | 1057 | 1 | .897 | 4.26 |

== Rankings ==
| Poll | Week | | | | | | | | | | | | | | | | | | | | | | | | | | |
| Poll | Pre | 1 | 2 | 3 | 4 | 5 | 6 | 7 | 8 | 9 | 10 | 11 | 12 | 13 | 14 | 15 | 16 | 17 | 18 | 19 | 20 | 21 | 22 | 23 | 24 | 25 | 26 (Final) |
|---|---|---|---|---|---|---|---|---|---|---|---|---|---|---|---|---|---|---|---|---|---|---|---|---|---|---|---|
| USCHO.com | NR | NR | NR | NR | NR | NR | NR | NR | NR | NR | NR | – | NR | NR | NR | NR | NR | NR | NR | NR | NR | NR | NR | NR | NR | – | NR |
| USA Hockey | NR | NR | NR | NR | NR | NR | NR | NR | NR | NR | NR | NR | – | NR | NR | NR | NR | NR | NR | NR | NR | NR | NR | NR | NR | NR | NR |

Note: USCHO did not release a poll in weeks 11 and 25.
Note: USA Hockey did not release a poll in week 12.
