= 2020–21 Holy Cross Crusaders men's ice hockey season =

- Conference: 11th Atlantic Hockey
- Home ice: Hart Center

Rankings
- USCHO.com: NR
- USA Today/ US Hockey Magazine: NR

Record
- Overall: 4–12–0
- Conference: 3–9–0–2–0–0
- Home: 3–6–0
- Road: 1–6–0

Coaches and captains
- Head coach: David Berard
- Assistant coaches: Peter Roundy; Max Mobley; Jon Lounsbury
- Captain(s): Logan Ferguson; Matt Slick
- Alternate captain(s): Pete Kessel; Anthony Vincent

The 2020–21 Holy Cross Crusaders men's ice hockey season was the 55th season of play for the program, the 23rd at the Division I level, and the 18th season in the Atlantic Hockey conference. The Crusaders represented the College of the Holy Cross and were coached by David Berard, in his 7th season.

The start of the college hockey season was delayed due to the ongoing coronavirus pandemic. As a result, Holy Cross's first scheduled game was in mid-November as opposed to early-October, which was the norm.

== Season ==
Despite several COVID-related changes to the schedule, Holy Cross began the season well, winning 4 of their first 6 games and sat near the top of the conference in early December with a 4–1 mark in Atlantic Hockey play. The team added a series against Quinnipiac just before Christmas and the two losses seemed to reverse the Crusaders' fortunes. Holy Cross lost all of their remaining games with the offense being dormant for most of those contests. In their final 10 matches, Holy Cross scored just 10 goals and were shut out 4 times. With their schedule being rearranged in February, the Crusaders played only two games in the entire month and sat at the bottom of their conference when the Atlantic Hockey tournament was set to begin.

Four days before they were to play Sacred Heart in the first round, Holy Cross received a positive Covid test and immediately suspended all team activities. This caused the team to withdraw from the conference tournament and cancel the remainder of their season.

Erkka Vänskä sat out for the season.

== Departures ==
Player	Position	Nationality	Cause
Charlie Barrow	Defenseman	United States	Graduation
Will Brophy	Defenseman	United States	Graduation
Beau Collins	Goaltender	United States	Graduation
Kevin Darrar	Forward	United States	Graduation
Christian Hayes	Forward	United States	Transferred to Trinity
Patrick O'Leary	Defenseman	United States	Graduation
Neil Robinson	Forward	Canada	Graduation
Dalton Skelly	Defenseman	United States	Graduation (Signed with Knoxville Ice Bears)
Jack Surowiec	Forward	United States	Graduation

== Recruiting ==
Player	Position	Nationality	Age	Notes
Alec Cicero	Forward	United States	19	Buffalo, NY
Jake Higgins	Defenseman	United States	19	Hingham, MA
Michael Kane	Forward	United States	20	Guilford, CT
Jack MacNab	Forward	United States	22	Indianapolis, IN; transfer from Notre Dame
Ryan Pineault	Defenseman	United States	19	Glastonbury, CT
Jack Ricketts	Forward	Canada	21	Oakville, ON
Jack Robilotti	Defenseman	United States	19	New York, NY
Lucas Thorne	Forward	Canada	21	Dunnville, ON

== Roster ==
As of August 31, 2020.

No.	Nat.	Player	Class	Pos	Height	Weight	DoB	Hometown	Previous team	NHL rights
2	(United States)	Jack Robilotti	Freshman	D	6' 3" (1.91 m)	194 lb (88 kg)	2001-07-18	New York, New York	Fargo (USHL)	—
3	(United States)	Frank Boie	Senior	D	6' 1" (1.85 m)	193 lb (88 kg)	1998-05-15	Needham, Massachusetts	Langley (BCHL)	—
4	(United States)	Jake Higgins	Freshman	D	6' 2" (1.88 m)	205 lb (93 kg)	2001-06-09	Hingham, Massachusetts	Deerfield (USHS–MA)	—
5	(United States)	Mike Higgins	Sophomore	D	5' 10" (1.78 m)	205 lb (93 kg)	2000-04-06	Needham, Massachusetts	Northeast (NAHL)	—
6	(United States)	Bryce Dolan	Junior	D	6' 1" (1.85 m)	190 lb (86 kg)	1999-02-13	Barrington, Rhode Island	Kimball Union (USHS–NH)	—
7	(United States)	Nick Hale	Sophomore	D	5' 9" (1.75 m)	165 lb (75 kg)	1999-05-07	Raleigh, North Carolina	Brooks (AJHL)	—
8	(United States)	Michael Kane	Freshman	F	6' 0" (1.83 m)	190 lb (86 kg)	2000-04-01	Guilford, Connecticut	Jersey (NCDC)	—
11	(United States)	Ryan Pineault	Freshman	D	5' 9" (1.75 m)	160 lb (73 kg)	2001-02-10	Glastonbury, Connecticut	Westminster (USHS–CT)	—
12	(United States)	Conner Jean	Junior	F	5' 10" (1.78 m)	183 lb (83 kg)	1997-02-15	Oakland, Michigan	Brooks (AJHL)	—
13	(Canada)	Grayson Constable	Sophomore	F	6' 2" (1.88 m)	201 lb (91 kg)	1998-05-05	Lethbridge, Alberta	Bonnyville (AJHL)	—
15	(Canada)	Jack Ricketts	Freshman	F	6' 1" (1.85 m)	195 lb (88 kg)	1999-09-08	Oakville, Ontario	Oakville (OJHL)	—
17	(United States)	Ryan Leibold	Junior	F	5' 10" (1.78 m)	195 lb (88 kg)	1998-11-03	Ashburn, Virginia	Sioux City (USHL)	—
18	(Canada)	Bobby Young	Sophomore	F	5' 11" (1.8 m)	185 lb (84 kg)	1998-11-08	Kitchener, Ontario	Bonnyville (AJHL)	—
19	(United States)	Alex Peterson	Sophomore	F	5' 10" (1.78 m)	172 lb (78 kg)	1998-03-27	Lansdale, Pennsylvania	Amarillo (NAHL)	—
20	(Canada)	Logan Ferguson (C)	Senior	F	6' 1" (1.85 m)	179 lb (81 kg)	1997-04-18	Calgary, Alberta	Canmore (AJHL)	—
21	(United States)	Alec Cicero	Freshman	F	5' 10" (1.78 m)	180 lb (82 kg)	2001-03-09	Williamsville, New York	Buffalo (OJHL)	—
22	(Canada)	Lucas Thorne	Freshman	F	6' 0" (1.83 m)	185 lb (84 kg)	1999-03-05	Dunnville, Ontario	Bonnyville (AJHL)	—
23	(United States)	Jack MacNab	Freshman (RS)	F	6' 5" (1.96 m)	195 lb (88 kg)	1998-07-03	Indianapolis, Indiana	Notre Dame (Big Ten)	—
24	(Canada)	Andrew Dumaresque	Senior	F	6' 1" (1.85 m)	194 lb (88 kg)	1997-02-25	Hammonds Plains, Nova Scotia	Langley (BCHL)	—
26	(United States)	Pete Kessel (A)	Senior	F	6' 2" (1.88 m)	192 lb (87 kg)	1996-01-19	Bloomfield Hills, Michigan	Lone Star (NAHL)	—
27	(United States)	Matt Slick (C)	Junior	D	6' 1" (1.85 m)	214 lb (97 kg)	1999-03-13	Buffalo, New York	Chilliwack (BCHL)	—
28	(Canada)	Logan Milliken	Senior	D	5' 11" (1.8 m)	187 lb (85 kg)	1997-06-30	Canmore, Alberta	Wenatchee (BCHL)	—
29	(United States)	Erik Gordon	Junior	G	5' 10" (1.78 m)	172 lb (78 kg)	1999-01-05	Duluth, Georgia	Calgary Canucks (AJHL)	—
30	(Canada)	Matt Radomsky	Sophomore	G	6' 2" (1.88 m)	185 lb (84 kg)	1999-06-21	Winnipeg, Manitoba	Steinbach (MJHL)	—
34	(United States)	Anthony Vincent (A)	Junior	F	5' 10" (1.78 m)	180 lb (82 kg)	1997-08-12	Wilton, Connecticut	Chilliwack (BCHL)	—
37	(United States)	Jake Pappalardo	Senior	F	5' 10" (1.78 m)	185 lb (84 kg)	1997-07-11	Salem, New Hampshire	Maine (HEA)	—
40	(Finland)	Erkka Vänskä	Junior	F	5' 11" (1.8 m)	168 lb (76 kg)	1998-02-15	Espoo, Finland	Fairbanks (NAHL)	—

== Standings ==
2020–21 Atlantic Hockey Standings
	Conference record											Overall record					
	GP	W	L	T	OW	OL	SW	PTS	PT%	GF	GA	GP	W	L	T	GF	GA
#15 American International †*	12	11	1	0	1	0	0	32	.889	47	18	19	15	4	0	67	40
Army	15	10	4	1	3	1	1	30	.667	42	33	22	15	6	1	71	48
Robert Morris	15	10	5	0	2	1	0	29	.644	58	48	24	15	9	0	85	69
Canisius	13	8	5	0	1	1	0	24	.615	42	34	17	11	6	0	59	46
RIT	13	7	5	1	0	0	1	23	.590	43	40	20	9	9	2	68	70
Sacred Heart	13	6	6	1	1	2	0	20	.513	35	38	18	6	10	2	43	59
Mercyhurst	16	7	8	1	1	1	1	23	.479	54	50	21	8	12	1	64	67
Bentley	15	4	11	0	1	5	0	16	.356	35	48	16	5	11	0	42	51
Niagara	15	3	9	3	0	2	1	15	.333	39	53	22	7	12	3	57	70
Air Force	13	3	9	1	2	1	0	9	.231	32	49	14	3	10	1	35	56
Holy Cross	12	3	9	0	2	0	0	7	.194	22	38	16	4	12	0	30	52
Championship: March 20, 2021 † indicates conference regular season champion * indicates conference tournament champion (Riley Trophy); Rankings: USCHO.com Top 20 Poll

== Schedule and results ==
Date	Time	Opponent^{#}	Rank^{#}	Site	TV	Decision	Result	Attendance	Record
Regular season
November 19	10:37 AM	vs. Long Island*		Hart Center • Worcester, Massachusetts		Radomsky	L 2–3 ^{OT}	0	0–1–0
November 22	4:00 PM	vs. Long Island*		Hart Center • Worcester, Massachusetts		Gordon	W 5–2	0	1–1–0
December 1	6:30 PM	at Bentley		Bentley Arena • Waltham, Massachusetts		Gordon	W 2–1 ^{OT}	0	2–1–0 (1–0–0)
December 4	6:00 PM	at Sacred Heart		Webster Bank Arena • Bridgeport, Connecticut		Gordon	L 1–2	0	2–2–0 (1–1–0)
December 6	2:00 PM	Sacred Heart		Hart Center • Worcester, Massachusetts		Gordon	W 6–3	0	3–2–0 (2–1–0)
December 9	6:00 PM	at Bentley		Hart Center • Worcester, Massachusetts		Gordon	W 4–3 ^{OT}	0	4–2–0 (3–1–0)
December 22	5:00 PM	at #16 Quinnipiac*		People's United Center • Hamden, Connecticut		Radomsky	L 1–6	0	4–3–0
December 23	5:05 PM	at #16 Quinnipiac*		People's United Center • Hamden, Connecticut		Gordon	L 0–3	0	4–4–0
January 17	1:00 PM	at #20 American International		MassMutual Center • Springfield, Massachusetts		Gordon	L 0–1	0	4–5–0 (3–2–0)
January 21	6:00 PM	vs. Army		Hart Center • Worcester, Massachusetts		Gordon	L 2–3	0	4–6–0 (3–3–0)
January 22	6:00 PM	vs. Army		Hart Center • Worcester, Massachusetts		Gordon	L 1–4	0	4–7–0 (3–4–0)
January 26	5:05 PM	at Bentley		Bentley Arena • Waltham, Massachusetts		Gordon	L 2–5	0	4–8–0 (3–5–0)
January 29	5:00 PM	vs. #19 American International		Hart Center • Worcester, Massachusetts		Radomsky	L 0–6	0	4–9–0 (3–6–0)
January 30	2:00 PM	at #19 American International		MassMutual Center • Springfield, Massachusetts		Gordon	L 0–3	0	4–10–0 (3–7–0)
February 19	7:35 PM	at Sacred Heart		Webster Bank Arena • Bridgeport, Connecticut		Radomsky	L 1–2	0	4–11–0 (3–8–0)
February 20	4:05 PM	at Sacred Heart		Webster Bank Arena • Bridgeport, Connecticut		Radomsky	L 3–5	0	4–12–0 (3–9–0)
Atlantic Hockey Tournament
Participation Cancelled
*Non-conference game. ^{#}Rankings from USCHO.com Poll. All times are in Eastern Time.

== Scoring statistics ==
Name	Position	Games	Goals	Assists	Points	PIM
Alex Peterson	F	12	4	5	9	23
Jake Pappalardo	C	13	5	3	8	12
Ryan Leibold	F	14	2	6	8	6
Logan Ferguson	RW	15	3	4	7	8
Anthony Vincent	F	14	3	2	5	29
Andrew Dumaresque	C	16	2	2	4	10
Michael Kane	F	13	2	1	3	6
Bobby Young	C	15	2	1	3	2
Jack Robilotti	D	16	2	1	3	20
Logan Milliken	D	13	1	2	3	2
Connor Jean	C	10	0	3	3	4
Jack Ricketts	C	5	1	1	2	2
Frank Boie	D	15	1	1	2	4
Matt Slick	D	16	1	1	2	6
Grayson Constable	F	14	0	2	2	6
Nick Hale	D	15	0	2	2	4
Alec Cicero	F	16	1	0	1	4
Jack MacNab	RW	8	0	1	1	6
Mike Higgins	D	13	0	1	1	4
Pete Kessel	F	16	0	1	1	2
Bryce Dolan	D	16	0	1	1	0
Jake Higgins	D	5	0	0	0	0
Matt Radomsky	G	6	0	0	0	0
Ryan Pineault	D	7	0	0	0	0
Lucas Thorne	C	7	0	0	0	0
Erik Gordon	G	11	0	0	0	0
Bench	-	16	0	0	0	8
Total			30	41	71	170

== Goaltending statistics ==
Name	Games	Minutes	Wins	Losses	Ties	Goals against	Saves	Shut outs	SV %	GAA
Erik Gordon	11	648	4	7	0	29	281	0	.906	2.68
Matt Radomsky	6	312	0	5	0	21	141	0	.870	4.03
Empty Net	-	4	-	-	-	2	-	-	-	-
Total	16	966	4	12	0	52	422	0	.890	3.23

== Rankings ==
Poll	Week																					
Poll	Pre	1	2	3	4	5	6	7	8	9	10	11	12	13	14	15	16	17	18	19	20	21 (Final)
USCHO.com	NR	NR	NR	NR	NR	NR	NR	NR	NR	NR	NR	NR	NR	NR	NR	NR	NR	NR	NR	NR	-	NR
USA Today	NR	NR	NR	NR	NR	NR	NR	NR	NR	NR	NR	NR	NR	NR	NR	NR	NR	NR	NR	NR	NR	NR

USCHO did not release a poll in week 20.

== Awards and honors ==
Player	Award	Ref
Matt Slick	Atlantic Hockey Second Team	
