= David Berard =

American ice hockey player and coach

Current position
- Title: Head coach
- Team: Stonehill
- Conference: Independent
- Record: 22–44–3 (.341)

Biographical details
- Born: October 17, 1970 (age 56); West Warwick, Rhode Island, U.S.
- Education: Providence College

Playing career
- 1988–1992: Providence
- Position: Goaltender

Coaching career (HC unless noted)
- 1992–1994: Colby (Assistant)
- 1994–1996: Providence (Assistant)
- 1996–1998: Lake Superior State (Assistant)
- 1998–2011: Providence (Assistant)
- 2011–2012: Connecticut (Assistant)
- 2012–2013: Connecticut (Interim)
- 2014–2021: Holy Cross
- 2024–present: Stonehill

Administrative career (AD unless noted)
- 2013–2014: Providence (Dir. of Hockey Ops.)
- 2021–2024: Providence (Vice President)

Head coaching record
- Overall: 125–160–40 (.446)

David Berard (born October 17, 1970) is the current head coach for the Stonehill Skyhawks men's ice hockey team.

== Career ==
Berard started his college career as a goaltender for Providence in 1988. He spent four years as a backup for the Friars, playing in only 5 games before graduating with a degree in business marketing. He remained at the college level by taking an assistant coaching position with Colby, staying with the program for two years before returning to his alma mater. Berard was an assistant for the Friars for two more seasons and accepted a similar post from Lake Superior State starting in 1996. Two years later he was back in Providence for a third time but decided to remain with the Friars for an extended period. From 1998 through 2011 he was an assistant coach under Paul Pooley and Tim Army, but he also served as the teams recruiting coordinator for seven seasons, was promoted to an associate coach from 2003 through 2005 and was USA Hockey's director of player development for the New England region from 2003 to 2008.

When Tim Army was replaced by Nate Leaman in 2011, Berard was replaced and he became an assistant with Connecticut. In just over a year, he suddenly found himself as the interim head coach for the Huskies when Bruce Marshall took a medical leave of absence. Berard remained behind the bench for Connecticut for the remainder of the season, compiling a record of 19–10–3 and getting the Huskies into a 3rd place finish in the conference. His efforts were not enough, however, and Connecticut opted to name Mike Cavanaugh as the bench boss for the next season.

Berard found himself back with the Friars yet again the next season as the Director of Hockey Operations but after only one year at that post he left to receive his first full-time head coaching post with Holy Cross. In his short time with the Crusaders Berard has seen a moderate amount of success, recording three consecutive double-digit win seasons but only one of them was above .500.

== Personal life ==
Berard's son Brett Berard is an ice hockey forward for the Hartford Wolf Pack of the AHL as a prospect for the New York Rangers. He previously played for the Providence Friars men's ice hockey team. Brett was drafted by the Rangers in the 5th round (134th overall) of the 2020 NHL entry draft. Brett won a gold medal with the United States men's national junior ice hockey team at the 2021 World Junior Ice Hockey Championships.

Berard's youngest son, Brady, is a forward for Boston College.

== Head coaching record ==
Record table
Season	Team	Overall	Conference	Standing	Postseason
Connecticut Huskies (Atlantic Hockey) (2012–2013)
2012–13	Connecticut	19–10–3†	14–7–3†	3rd	Atlantic Hockey Semifinals
Connecticut:		19–10–3	14–7–3		
Holy Cross Crusaders (Atlantic Hockey) (2014–2021)
2014–15	Holy Cross	14–18–5	12–11–5	t-6th	Atlantic Hockey Opening Round
2015–16	Holy Cross	18–13–5	16–7–5	t-2nd	Atlantic Hockey Quarterfinals
2016–17	Holy Cross	14–15–7	11–10–7	5th	Atlantic Hockey Quarterfinals
2017–18	Holy Cross	13–16–7	12–10–6	t-3rd	Atlantic Hockey Quarterfinals
2018–19	Holy Cross	10–21–5	10–14–4	t-8th	Atlantic Hockey First Round
2019–20	Holy Cross	11–21–5	9–16–3–2	10th	Atlantic Hockey First Round
2020–21	Holy Cross	4–12–0	3–9–0	11th	Participation cancelled due to COVID-19
Holy Cross:		84–116–34	73–77–30		
Stonehill Skyhawks (Division I Independent) (2024–present)
2024–25	Stonehill	12–22–0			
2024–25	Stonehill	10–22–3			UCHC Third Place Game (Loss)
Stonehill:		22–44–3			
Total:		125–160–40 (.446)			
National champion Postseason invitational champion Conference regular season champion Conference regular season and conference tournament champion Division regular season champion Division regular season and conference tournament champion Conference tournament champion

† Berard assumed head coaching duties on November 6, 2012
