= Former NCAA players in the National Hockey League =

Main logo used by the NCAA in Divisions I, II, and III.

This is a list of NCAA Division I ice hockey teams that have produced alumni who have played in the National Hockey League.

== Current NCAA Division I teams ==
A list of career leaders for current NCAA Division I programs
As of July 1, 2026.

| = Active Players |

| School | Players | Most Games | Stanley Cups | NHL All-Stars | Hockey Hall of Famers |
|---|---|---|---|---|---|
| Air Force | 0 | – | – | – | – |
| Alaska | 12 | 800 (Colton Parayko) | 4 | 0 | 0 |
| Alaska Anchorage | 9 | 646 (Jay Beagle) | 2 | 0 | 0 |
| Arizona State | 4 | 173 (Joey Daccord) | 0 | 0 | 0 |
| Army | 1 | 503 (Dan Hinote) | 1 | 0 | 0 |
| Augustana | 0 | – | – | – | – |
| Bemidji State | 10 | 943 (Joel Otto) | 2 | 0 | 0 |
| Bentley | 0 | – | – | – | – |
| Boston College | 99 | 1,263 (Bill Guerin) | 23 | 6 | 3 |
| Boston University | 107 | 1,201 (Keith Tkachuk) | 17 | 9 | 0 |
| Bowling Green | 41 | 1,270 (Rob Blake) | 6 | 3 | 1 |
| Brown | 19 | 672 (Garnet Hathaway) | 0 | 1 | 0 |
| Canisius | 1 | 193 (Cory Conacher) | 0 | 0 | 0 |
| Clarkson | 28 | 1,195 (Todd Marchant) | 8 | 1 | 0 |
| Colgate | 20 | 754 (Mike Milbury) | 1 | 1 | 0 |
| Colorado College | 40 | 897 (Doug Lidster) | 6 | 0 | 1 |
| Connecticut | 13 | 543 (Todd Krygier) | 0 | 0 | 0 |
| Cornell | 40 | 1,257 (Joe Nieuwendyk) | 9 | 2 | 2 |
| Dartmouth | 19 | 911 (Lee Stempniak) | 1 | 0 | 0 |
| Denver | 89 | 1,188 (Kevin Dineen) | 16 | 3 | 2 |
| Ferris State | 12 | 1,022 (Chris Kunitz) | 4 | 1 | 0 |
| Harvard | 45 | 1,115 (Don Sweeney) | 5 | 3 | 0 |
| Holy Cross | 2 | 192 (Patrick Rissmiller) | 0 | 0 | 0 |
| Lake Superior State | 33 | 1,256 (Brian Rolston) | 4 | 2 | 0 |
| Lindenwood | 0 | – | – | – | – |
| Long Island | 0 | – | – | – | – |
| Maine | 61 | 1,157 (Eric Weinrich) | 6 | 4 | 1 |
| Massachusetts | 29 | 842 (Justin Braun) | 7 | 4 | 0 |
| Massachusetts Lowell | 24 | 1,132 (Ron Hainsey) | 6 | 2 | 0 |
| Merrimack | 15 | 373 (Steve McKenna) | 0 | 0 | 0 |
| Miami | 38 | 1,093 (Dan Boyle) | 9 | 1 | 0 |
| Michigan | 122 | 1,294 (Andrew Cogliano) | 20 | 2 | 0 |
| Michigan State | 80 | 1,484 (Rod Brind'Amour) | 9 | 7 | 1 |
| Michigan Tech | 52 | 932 (Randy McKay) | 5 | 2 | 1 |
| Minnesota | 127 | 1,286 (Phil Kessel) | 13 | 3 | 2 |
| Minnesota Duluth | 72 | 1,269 (Brett Hull) | 11 | 2 | 1 |
| Minnesota State | 24 | 965 (David Backes) | 2 | 1 | 0 |
| New Hampshire | 47 | 1,154 (James van Riemsdyk) | 7 | 1 | 1 |
| Niagara | 2 | 12 (Matt Ryan) | 0 | 0 | 0 |
| North Dakota | 114 | 1,280 (James Patrick) | 16 | 4 | 1 |
| Northeastern | 35 | 758 (Jamie Oleksiak) | 2 | 0 | 0 |
| Northern Michigan | 23 | 1,009 (Dallas Drake) | 1 | 0 | 0 |
| Notre Dame | 43 | 990 (Ian Cole) | 11 | 1 | 0 |
| Ohio State | 38 | 1,128 (Jamie Macoun) | 2 | 1 | 0 |
| Omaha | 20 | 681 (Jake Guentzel) | 3 | 0 | 0 |
| Penn State | 5 | 23 (Brett Murray) | 0 | 0 | 0 |
| Princeton | 16 | 976 (Jeff Halpern) | 3 | 0 | 0 |
| Providence | 52 | 1,108 (Hal Gill) | 7 | 0 | 0 |
| Quinnipiac | 13 | 541 (Devon Toews) | 1 | 0 | 0 |
| Rensselaer | 26 | 1,337 (Adam Oates) | 1 | 3 | 1 |
| RIT | 3 | 878 (Christopher Tanev) | 0 | 0 | 0 |
| Robert Morris | 0 | – | – | – | – |
| Sacred Heart | 2 | 187 (Justin Danforth) | 0 | 0 | 0 |
| St. Cloud State | 41 | 1,516 (Matt Cullen) | 7 | 3 | 1 |
| St. Lawrence | 25 | 684 (Gary Croteau) | 2 | 0 | 0 |
| St. Thomas | 1 | 360 (Elwin Romnes) | 2 | 0 | 0 |
| Stonehill | 0 | – | – | – | – |
| Union | 14 | 744 (Shayne Gostisbehere) | 1 | 1 | 0 |
| Vermont | 18 | 1,134 (Martin St. Louis) | 9 | 3 | 1 |
| Western Michigan | 41 | 915 (Jamal Mayers) | 3 | 0 | 0 |
| Wisconsin | 92 | 1,651 (Chris Chelios) | 22 | 11 | 1 |
| Yale | 24 | 741 (Randy Wood) | 0 | 1 | 0 |

== Former NCAA Division I teams ==
List includes both active and defunct programs that previously played at the Division I level or equivalent.

| School | Players | Most Games | Stanley Cups | NHL All-Stars | Hockey Hall of Famers |
|---|---|---|---|---|---|
| Alabama–Huntsville | 2 | 567 (Cam Talbot) | 0 | 0 | 0 |
| American International | 2 | 362 (Dave Forbes) | 0 | 0 | 0 |
| Gonzaga | 1 | 72 (Frank McCool) | 1 | 0 | 0 |
| Hamilton | 1 | 491 (Guy Hebert) | 0 | 0 | 0 |
| Illinois | 1 | 36 (Aldo Palazzari) | 0 | 0 | 0 |
| Illinois–Chicago | 4 | 292 (Shawn Cronin) | 0 | 0 | 0 |
| Kent State | 1 | 96 (Dean Sylvester) | 0 | 0 | 0 |
| Marquette | 2 | 176 (Don McFadyen) | 1 | 0 | 0 |
| Mercyhurst | 1 | 1 (Jamie Hunt) | 0 | 0 | 0 |
| Middlebury | 1 | 4 (Phil Latreille) | 0 | 0 | 0 |
| Northern Arizona | 2 | 1,056 (Greg Adams) | 0 | 0 | 0 |
| Norwich | 3 | 145 (Keith Aucoin) | 0 | 0 | 0 |
| Pennsylvania | 1 | 21 (Paul Stewart) | 0 | 0 | 0 |
| Saint Louis | 4 | 231 (Mario Faubert) | 0 | 0 | 0 |
| United States International | 2 | 8 (Darren Lowe) | 0 | 0 | 0 |

== Stanley Cup Winners ==
List of former college players who won the Stanley Cup by year since 1918. Gerry Geran was the first collegiate alumnus to play major professional hockey, appearing for the Montreal Wanderers during the 1917–18 season.

| Year | Team | Players |
|---|---|---|
| 1918 | Toronto | 0: none |
| 1919 | not awarded | |
| 1920 | Ottawa Senators | 0: none |
| 1921 | Ottawa Senators | 0: none |
| 1922 | Toronto St. Patricks | 0: none |
| 1923 | Ottawa Senators | 0: none |
| 1924 | Montreal Canadiens | 0: none |
| 1925 | Victoria Cougars | 0: none |
| 1926 | Montreal Maroons | 0: none |
| 1927 | Ottawa Senators | 0: none |
| 1928 | New York Rangers | 0: none |
| 1929 | Boston Bruins | 2: Myles Lane (Dartmouth), George Owen (Harvard) |
| 1930 | Montreal Canadiens | 0: none |
| 1931 | Montreal Canadiens | 0: none |
| 1932 | Toronto Maple Leafs | 0: none |
| 1933 | New York Rangers | 0: none |
| 1934 | Chicago Black Hawks | 2: Don McFadyen (Marquette), Elwin Romnes (St. Thomas) |
| 1935 | Montreal Maroons | 0: none |
| 1936 | Detroit Red Wings | 0: none |
| 1937 | Detroit Red Wings | 0: none |
| 1938 | Chicago Black Hawks | 1: Elwin Romnes (St. Thomas) |
| 1939 | Boston Bruins | 1: Frank Brimsek (St. Cloud State) |
| 1940 | New York Rangers | 0: none |
| 1941 | Boston Bruins | 1: Frank Brimsek (St. Cloud State) |
| 1942 | Toronto Maple Leafs | 0: none |
| 1943 | Detroit Red Wings | 0: none |
| 1944 | Montreal Canadiens | 0: none |
| 1945 | Toronto Maple Leafs | 1: Frank McCool (Gonzaga) |
| 1946 | Montreal Canadiens | 0: none |
| 1947 | Toronto Maple Leafs | 0: none |
| 1948 | Toronto Maple Leafs | 0: none |
| 1949 | Toronto Maple Leafs | 0: none |
| 1950 | Detroit Red Wings | 0: none |
| 1951 | Toronto Maple Leafs | 0: none |
| 1952 | Detroit Red Wings | 0: none |
| 1953 | Montreal Canadiens | 0: none |
| 1954 | Detroit Red Wings | 0: none |
| 1955 | Detroit Red Wings | 0: none |
| 1956 | Montreal Canadiens | 0: none |
| 1957 | Montreal Canadiens | 0: none |
| 1958 | Montreal Canadiens | 0: none |
| 1959 | Montreal Canadiens | 0: none |
| 1960 | Montreal Canadiens | 0: none |
| 1961 | Chicago Black Hawks | 1: Bill Hay (Colorado College) |
| 1962 | Toronto Maple Leafs | 1: John MacMillan (Denver) |
| 1963 | Toronto Maple Leafs | 1: John MacMillan (Denver) |
| 1964 | Toronto Maple Leafs | 0: none |
| 1965 | Montreal Canadiens | 1: Red Berenson (Michigan) |
| 1966 | Montreal Canadiens | 0: none |
| 1967 | Toronto Maple Leafs | 0: none |
| 1968 | Montreal Canadiens | 0: none |
| 1969 | Montreal Canadiens | 1: Tony Esposito (Michigan Tech) |
| 1970 | Boston Bruins | 0: none |
| 1971 | Montreal Canadiens | 1: Ken Dryden (Cornell) |
| 1972 | Boston Bruins | 0: none |
| 1973 | Montreal Canadiens | 1: Ken Dryden (Cornell) |
| 1974 | Philadelphia Flyers | 0: none |
| 1975 | Philadelphia Flyers | 0: none |
| 1976 | Montreal Canadiens | 2: Ken Dryden (Cornell), Bill Nyrop (Notre Dame) |
| 1977 | Montreal Canadiens | 2: Ken Dryden (Cornell), Bill Nyrop (Notre Dame) |
| 1978 | Montreal Canadiens | 2: Ken Dryden (Cornell), Bill Nyrop (Notre Dame) |
| 1979 | Montreal Canadiens | 3: Ken Dryden (Cornell), Pat Hughes (Michigan), Rod Langway (New Hampshire) |
| 1980 | New York Islanders | 4: Dave Langevin (Minnesota Duluth), Bob Lorimer (Michigan Tech), Ken Morrow (Bowling Green), Chico Resch (Minnesota Duluth) |
| 1981 | New York Islanders | 3: Dave Langevin (Minnesota Duluth), Bob Lorimer (Michigan Tech), Ken Morrow (Bowling Green) |
| 1982 | New York Islanders | 2: Dave Langevin (Minnesota Duluth), Ken Morrow (Bowling Green) |
| 1983 | New York Islanders | 2: Dave Langevin (Minnesota Duluth), Ken Morrow (Bowling Green) |
| 1984 | Edmonton Oilers | 4: Glenn Anderson (Denver), Pat Hughes (Michigan), Don Jackson (Notre Dame), Dave Lumley (New Hampshire) |
| 1985 | Edmonton Oilers | 4: Glenn Anderson (Denver), Pat Hughes (Michigan), Don Jackson (Notre Dame), Dave Lumley (New Hampshire) |
| 1986 | Montreal Canadiens | 6: Chris Chelios (Wisconsin), Tom Kurvers (Minnesota Duluth), Craig Ludwig (North Dakota), Mike McPhee (Rensselaer), David Maley (Wisconsin), Chris Nilan (Northeastern), Steve Rooney (Providence) |
| 1987 | Edmonton Oilers | 2: Glenn Anderson (Denver), Craig MacTavish (Massachusetts Lowell) |
| 1988 | Edmonton Oilers | 4: Glenn Anderson (Denver), Normand Lacombe (New Hampshire), Craig MacTavish (Massachusetts Lowell), Craig Simpson (Michigan State) |
| 1989 | Calgary Flames | 6: Joe Mullen (Boston College), Brian MacLellan (Bowling Green), Jamie Macoun (Ohio State), Joe Nieuwendyk (Cornell), Joel Otto (Bemidji State), Colin Patterson (Clarkson), Gary Suter (Wisconsin) |
| 1990 | Edmonton Oilers | 5: Glenn Anderson (Denver), Craig MacTavish (Massachusetts Lowell), Joe Murphy (Michigan State), Craig Simpson (Michigan State), Geoff Smith (North Dakota) |
| 1991 | Pittsburgh Penguins | 7: Jay Caufield (North Dakota), Joe Mullen (Boston College), Frank Pietrangelo (Minnesota), Paul Stanton (Wisconsin), Kevin Stevens (Boston College), Peter Taglianetti (Providence), Scott Young (Boston University) |
| 1992 | Pittsburgh Penguins | 7: Jock Callander (Providence), Jay Caufield (North Dakota), Shawn McEachern (Boston University), Joe Mullen (Boston College), Paul Stanton (Wisconsin), Kevin Stevens (Boston College), Peter Taglianetti (Providence) |
| 1993 | Montreal Canadiens | 3: Sean Hill (Wisconsin), John LeClair (Vermont), Ed Ronan (Boston University) |
| 1994 | New York Rangers | 6: Glenn Anderson (Denver), Glenn Healy (Western Michigan), Brian Leetch (Boston College), Doug Lidster (Colorado College), Craig MacTavish (Massachusetts Lowell), Mike Richter (Wisconsin) |
| 1995 | New Jersey Devils | 13: Neal Broten (Minnesota), Shawn Chambers (Alaska), Tom Chorske (Minnesota), Danton Cole (Michigan State), Kevin Dean (New Hampshire), Jim Dowd (Lake Superior State), Bruce Driver (Wisconsin), Bill Guerin (Boston College), Chris McAlpine (Minnesota), Randy McKay (Michigan Tech), Mike Peluso (Alaska Anchorage), Brian Rolston (Lake Superior State), Chris Terreri (Providence) |
| 1996 | Colorado Avalanche | 2: Troy Murray (North Dakota), Scott Young (Boston University) |
| 1997 | Detroit Red Wings | 2: Doug Brown (Boston College), Aaron Ward (Michigan) |
| 1998 | Detroit Red Wings | 4: Doug Brown (Boston College), Mike Knuble (Michigan), Jamie Macoun (Ohio State), Aaron Ward (Michigan) |
| 1999 | Dallas Stars | 8: Ed Belfour (North Dakota), Shawn Chambers (Alaska), Tony Hrkac (North Dakota), Brett Hull (Minnesota Duluth), Craig Ludwig (North Dakota), Joe Nieuwendyk (Cornell), Derek Plante (Minnesota Duluth), Blake Sloan (Michigan) |
| 2000 | New Jersey Devils | 6: Brad Bombardir (North Dakota), John Madden (Michigan), Randy McKay (Michigan Tech), Jay Pandolfo (Boston University), Brian Rafalski (Wisconsin), Chris Terreri (Providence) |
| 2001 | Colorado Avalanche | 7: Rob Blake (Bowling Green), Greg de Vries (Bowling Green), Chris Drury (Boston University), Dan Hinote (Army), Bryan Muir (New Hampshire), Shjon Podein (Minnesota Duluth), Steve Reinprecht (Wisconsin) |
| 2002 | Detroit Red Wings | 2: Chris Chelios (Wisconsin), Brett Hull (Minnesota Duluth) |
| 2003 | New Jersey Devils | 5: Brian Gionta (Boston College), John Madden (Michigan), Joe Nieuwendyk (Cornell), Jay Pandolfo (Boston University), Brian Rafalski (Wisconsin) |
| 2004 | Tampa Bay Lightning | 5: Dan Boyle (Miami), Ben Clymer (Minnesota), John Grahame (Lake Superior State), Éric Perrin (Vermont), Martin St. Louis (Vermont) |
| 2005 | not awarded | |
| 2006 | Carolina Hurricanes | 10: Craig Adams (Harvard), Kevyn Adams (Miami), Rod Brind'Amour (Michigan State), Erik Cole (Clarkson), Mike Commodore (North Dakota), Matt Cullen (St. Cloud State), Bret Hedican (St. Cloud State), Andrew Hutchinson (Michigan State), Aaron Ward (Michigan), Doug Weight (Lake Superior State) |
| 2007 | Anaheim Ducks | 9: Ryan Carter (Minnesota State), Kent Huskins (Clarkson), Chris Kunitz (Ferris State), Todd Marchant (Clarkson), Andy McDonald (Colgate), Drew Miller (Michigan State), Joe Motzko (St. Cloud State), George Parros (Princeton), Ryan Shannon (Boston College) |
| 2008 | Detroit Red Wings | 3: Chris Chelios (Wisconsin), Dallas Drake (Northern Michigan), Brian Rafalski (Wisconsin) |
| 2009 | Pittsburgh Penguins | 8: Craig Adams (Harvard), Mark Eaton (Notre Dame), Hal Gill (Providence), Alex Goligoski (Minnesota), Bill Guerin (Boston College), Chris Kunitz (Ferris State), Brooks Orpik (Boston College), Rob Scuderi (Boston College) |
| 2010 | Chicago Blackhawks | 6: Adam Burish (Wisconsin), Jordan Hendry (Alaska), Duncan Keith (Michigan State), John Madden (Michigan), Patrick Sharp (Vermont), Jonathan Toews (North Dakota) |
| 2011 | Boston Bruins | 2: Rich Peverley (St. Lawrence), Tim Thomas (Vermont) |
| 2012 | Los Angeles Kings | 7: Davis Drewiske (Wisconsin), Matt Greene (North Dakota), Alec Martinez (Miami), Willie Mitchell (Clarkson), Jonathan Quick (Massachusetts), Rob Scuderi (Boston College), Kevin Westgarth (Princeton) |
| 2013 | Chicago Blackhawks | 8: Brandon Bollig (St. Lawrence), Duncan Keith (Michigan State), Nick Leddy (Minnesota), Jamal Mayers (Western Michigan), Patrick Sharp (Vermont), Ben Smith (Boston College), Viktor Stålberg (Vermont), Jonathan Toews (North Dakota) |
| 2014 | Los Angeles Kings | 4: Matt Greene (North Dakota), Alec Martinez (Miami), Willie Mitchell (Clarkson), Jonathan Quick (Massachusetts) |
| 2015 | Chicago Blackhawks | 5: Scott Darling (Maine), Duncan Keith (Michigan State), Patrick Sharp (Vermont), Jonathan Toews (North Dakota), Trevor van Riemsdyk (New Hampshire) |
| 2016 | Pittsburgh Penguins | 13: Nick Bonino (Boston University), Ian Cole (Notre Dame), Matt Cullen (St. Cloud State), Brian Dumoulin (Boston College), Carl Hagelin (Michigan), Phil Kessel (Minnesota), Chris Kunitz (Ferris State), Ben Lovejoy (Boston College / Dartmouth), Kevin Porter (Michigan), Bryan Rust (Notre Dame), Justin Schultz (Wisconsin), Conor Sheary (Massachusetts), Jeff Zatkoff (Miami) |
| 2017 | Pittsburgh Penguins | 15: Josh Archibald (Omaha), Nick Bonino (Boston University), Ian Cole (Notre Dame), Matt Cullen (St. Cloud State), Brian Dumoulin (Boston College), Jake Guentzel (Omaha), Carl Hagelin (Michigan), Ron Hainsey (Massachusetts Lowell), Phil Kessel (Minnesota), Chris Kunitz (Ferris State), Carter Rowney (North Dakota), Bryan Rust (Notre Dame), Justin Schultz (Wisconsin), Conor Sheary (Massachusetts), Scott Wilson (Massachusetts Lowell) |
| 2018 | Washington Capitals | 5: Jay Beagle (Alaska Anchorage), Alex Chiasson (Boston University), Matt Niskanen (Minnesota Duluth), Brooks Orpik (Boston College), T. J. Oshie (North Dakota) |
| 2019 | St. Louis Blues | 4: Tyler Bozak (Denver), Colton Parayko (Alaska), Zach Sanford (Boston College), Jaden Schwartz (Colorado College) |
| 2020 | Tampa Bay Lightning | 5: Blake Coleman (Miami), Alex Killorn (Harvard), Ryan McDonagh (Wisconsin), Curtis McElhinney (Colorado College), Kevin Shattenkirk (Boston University) |
| 2021 | Tampa Bay Lightning | 5: Blake Coleman (Miami), Ross Colton (Vermont), Alex Killorn (Harvard), Ryan McDonagh (Wisconsin), Curtis McElhinney (Colorado College) |
| 2022 | Colorado Avalanche | 8: Andrew Cogliano (Michigan), J. T. Compher (Michigan), Erik Johnson (Minnesota), Jack Johnson (Michigan), Logan O'Connor (Denver), Cale Makar (Massachusetts), Josh Manson (Northeastern), Nico Sturm (Clarkson) |
| 2023 | Vegas Golden Knights | 9: Teddy Blueger (Minnesota State), Paul Cotter (Western Michigan), Jack Eichel (Boston University), Ben Hutton (Maine), Phil Kessel (Minnesota), Alec Martinez (Miami), Jonathan Quick (Massachusetts), Reilly Smith (Miami), Zach Whitecloud (Bemidji State) |
| 2024 | Florida Panthers | 5: Ryan Lomberg (Maine), Brandon Montour (Massachusetts), Kyle Okposo (Minnesota), Evan Rodrigues (Boston University), Anthony Stolarz (Omaha) |
| 2025 | Florida Panthers | 4: A. J. Greer (Boston University), Evan Rodrigues (Boston University), Mackie Samoskevich (Michigan), Nate Schmidt (Minnesota) |
| 2026 | Carolina Hurricanes | 9: Jackson Blake (North Dakota), Brandon Bussi (Western Michigan), Shayne Gostisbehere (Union), K'Andre Miller (Wisconsin), Eric Robinson (Princeton), Mark Jankowski (Providence), Mike Reilly (Minnesota), Jaccob Slavin (Colorado College), Sean Walker (Bowling Green) |
