= Bridgewater Ice Arena =

Ice hockey rink in Massachusetts, US

- Interactive map of Bridgewater Ice Arena
- Location: 20 Bedford Park, Bridgewater, MA, 02324
- Coordinates: 41°57′09″N 70°58′16″W
- Capacity: 1,000
- Surface: 200' x 85' (hockey) (two rinks)

Construction
- Groundbreaking: 1995
- Opened: 1995

Tenants
- Stonehill Skyhawks men's ice hockey (1995–); Bridgewater Bandits (EHL) (1996–)

The Bridgewater Ice Arena in Bridgewater, Massachusetts is a dual-surface public ice hockey rink. The facility is currently used by both the Bridgewater Bandits and Stonehill Skyhawks as a home venue.

== Stonehill ==
In 2022, Stonehill College announced that it would be promoting all of its athletic programs to Division I for the following academic year. Since both the men's and women's programs used the Bridgewater Ice Arena as their respective homes, the rink will be one of the smallest home sites in D-I hockey.
