= Stonehill Skyhawks men's ice hockey =

- Current season
- University: Stonehill College
- Conference: Independent
- First season: 1978–79
- Head coach: David Berard; 3rd season, 22–44–3 (.341)
- Assistant coaches: Brian Rigali; Cam MacDonald
- Arena: Bridgewater Ice Arena Cap. 1,000; Warrior Ice Arena (Some Games) Cap. 700; Bridgewater, Massachusetts and Boston, Massachusetts
- Colors: Purple and white

Conference tournament champions
- ECAC Northeast: 2007; NE-10: 2016, 2020

Conference regular season champions
- NE-10: 2014, 2015, 2016

The Stonehill Skyhawks men's ice hockey team represents Stonehill College in NCAA Division I ice hockey. On April 5, 2022, the school announced that they were promoting all of their varsity programs to Division I for the 2022–23 academic year. The team plays their home games at Bridgewater Ice Arena, located over 9 miles away from Stonehill's campus in Easton, Massachusetts.

== History ==
Stonehill began playing varsity hockey in 1978 joining ECAC 3, the lowest level of college hockey at the time. They remained with the conference through its various rebrandings and member changes for over 30 years. During that time the team was not successful, posting just 4 winning seasons in its first 22 campaigns and never making a single postseason appearance.

The program's fortunes began to change in 2000 when former NHL player Scott Harlow was hired to coach the team. During his seven-year tenure, the club recorded three winning seasons, its first postseason victories, and captured its first conference championship. While Harlow was in charge, the program was also going through a transitional phase. After the Division II level of college hockey collapsed in 1984, there was no place for nominally D-II programs to play. When the NCAA began offering automatic bids to the Division III Tournament in 1999, it came with a caveat; programs could not participate in postseason play if their school participated at a higher level. Because Stonehill was a D-II school, they were frozen out of the reformatted ECAC Northeast tournament. However, since they were not alone in their plight, Stonehill banded together with four other programs and began holding a separate D-II tournament at the end of the season. This arrangement continued until 2009 when all of the active Division II programs founded the ice hockey division of the Northeast-10.

Stonehill fell on hard times after Harlow left in 2007. Six years later, upon the arrival of David Borges, the team suddenly shot up the standings and won three consecutive regular season titles. While the Skyhawks weren't able to sustain that pace forever, Borges help steer the program though the lost 2021 season and was behind the bench when the school announced that they were promoting all of their varsity programs to D-I in April 2022.

Stonehill's first season in Division I, the 2022-23 campaign, saw them finish with a winning record, however, the vast majority of their games were played against Division II and Division III opponents. They only played five games against Division I opponents, losing all five. The next season in 2023-24 would see the Skyhawks put together their first real Division I schedule with 34 of their 36 games against other Division I programs. The Skyhawks started the season with 28 consecutive losses. In their 29th game of the season on February 10, 2024, the Skyhawks claimed their first-ever win over a Division I opponent, with a 4-2 victory over Lindenwood in front of a crowd of 178 spectators. The Skyhawks would finish the season with a record of 2-34-0, with their other win coming over Division II Assumption. The 2024-25 season saw the Skyhawks sextuple their win total from the previous season, finishing with a record of 12-22-0. Following the 2025 season, the university received a $15 million gift from Tom and Kathleen Bogan to support building a new arena. Following the 2025-26 season, the Skyhawks were ranked fourth amongst the Division I Independent teams by NPI, and headed into the inaugural United Collegiate Hockey Cup as the #4 seed.

== Coaches ==
As of the completion of 2025–26 season

Tenure	Coach	Years	Record	Pct.
1978–1980	Bob Higgins	2	23–19–2	.545
1980–1984	Chuck Callan	4	36–49–1	.424
1984–1989	Dennis Chighisola	5	39–82–1	.324
1989–1990	Dante Muzzioli	1	14–12–0	.538
1990–1991	Fred Allard	1	6–22–0	.214
1991–1995	Peter Powers	4	34–56–5	.214
1995–2000	Greg Simeone	5	37–69–4	.355
2000–2007	Scott Harlow	7	81–83–3	.494
2007–2010	Garry Hebert	3	32–40–4	.447
2010–2013	Pat Leahy	3	25–45–4	.365
2013–2024	David Borges	10	106–142–24	.434
2024–Present	David Berard	2	22–44–3	.341
Totals	11 coaches	47 seasons	455–663–51	.411

== Statistical leaders ==
=== Career points leaders ===
Player	Years	GP	G	A	Pts	PIM
Rob Pascale	2000–2004	89	79	81	160	30
Brendan O'Brien	2005–2009	95	37	110	147	68
Brendan Flemming	1999–2003	91	75	63	138	70
Tim Quill	1988–1992		57	75	132	
Butch Santosuosso	1986–1990		64	67	131	
Dan Finn	1990–1994		73	56	129	
Tom Stover	1990–1994		61	66	127	
Mike Ryan	1999–2003	90	55	58	113	110
Kevin Joyce	1986–1990		54	52	106	
Matt Curran	2004–2008	95	61	44	105	296

=== Career goaltending leaders ===
GP = Games played; Min = Minutes played; W = Wins; L = Losses; T = Ties; GA = Goals against; SO = Shutouts; SV% = Save percentage; GAA = Goals against average

Minimum 30 games

Player	Years	GP	Min	W	L	T	GA	SO	SV%	GAA
Chris Tasiopoulos	2011–2015	78	4476	42	31	4	209	7	.916	2.80
Matthew Schoen	2016–2020	30	1692	14	12	3	81	1	.927	2.87
Connor Androlewicz	2024–2026	59	3369	19	36	3	178	3	.898	3.17
William Palmer	2015–2019	82	4749	29	43	9	255	2	.909	3.22
Tyler Jackson	2008–2012	31	1736	11	16	2	97	2	.896	3.35

Statistics current through the end of the 2025–26 season.

== Roster ==
As of August 2, 2025.

No.	Nat.	Player	Class	Pos	Height	Weight	DoB	Hometown	Previous team	NHL rights
2	(United States)	Adam Mahler	Freshman	D	6' 2" (1.88 m)	218 lb (99 kg)	2004-07-25	Ancaster, Ontario	Minot Minotauros (NAHL)	—
4	(Canada)	Charles Banquier	Junior	D	6' 2" (1.88 m)	200 lb (91 kg)	2002-10-06	Oakville, Ontario	Prince George Spruce Kings (BCHL)	—
5	(United States)	Ryan Davies	Senior	D	5' 10" (1.78 m)	179 lb (81 kg)	2001-03-27	Arlington, Massachusetts	Valley Jr. Warriors (EHL)	—
6	(United States)	Justin Gibson	Sophomore	D	6' 1" (1.85 m)	190 lb (86 kg)	2003-05-29	Pittsburgh, Pennsylvania	Johnstown Tomahawks (NAHL)	—
9	(Canada)	Brady Hunter	Junior	F	5' 8" (1.73 m)	174 lb (79 kg)	2002-07-27	Enfield, Nova Scotia	Merrimack (HEA)	—
10	(United States)	J. J. Grainda	Junior	F	6' 3" (1.91 m)	190 lb (86 kg)	2002-08-01	Carmel, Indiana	Chippewa Steel (NAHL)	—
11	(United States)	Justin Mexico	Sophomore	F	5' 10" (1.78 m)	165 lb (75 kg)	2003-12-05	Madison Heights, Michigan	American International (AHA)	—
12	(United States)	Zach Aben	Sophomore	F	5' 9" (1.75 m)	181 lb (82 kg)	2003-12-12	Shavertown, Pennsylvania	Johnstown Tomahawks (NAHL)	—
13	(Canada)	Leo Chambers	Sophomore	F	6' 1" (1.85 m)	174 lb (79 kg)	2003-12-22	Toronto, Ontario	Steinbach Pistons (MJHL)	—
14	(Canada)	Cole Melady	Sophomore	F	5' 11" (1.8 m)	187 lb (85 kg)	2003-07-14	Seaforth, Ontario	Coquitlam Express (BCHL)	—
15	(United States)	Billy Renfrew	Sophomore	F	5' 10" (1.78 m)	181 lb (82 kg)	2003-08-14	Fairbanks, Alaska	Northern Michigan (CCHA)	—
16	(Finland)	Joel Lehtinen	Sophomore	F	6' 2" (1.88 m)	181 lb (82 kg)	2003-11-12	Dallas, Texas	Minot Minotauros (NAHL)	—
17	(United States)	Pat Murphy	Freshman	F	5' 11" (1.8 m)	176 lb (80 kg)	2005-12-01	North Kingstown, Rhode Island	Cranbrook Bucks (BCHL)	—
18	(United States)	Jake Gutwirth	Freshman	F	5' 8" (1.73 m)	165 lb (75 kg)	2005-05-29	Brooklyn, New York	Cowichan Valley Capitals (BCHL)	—
19	(United States)	Frank Ireland	Senior	F	5' 11" (1.8 m)	185 lb (84 kg)	2001-02-06	South Easton, Massachusetts	Boston Junior Bruins (NCDC)	—
20	(United States)	David Posma	Senior	D	6' 0" (1.83 m)	170 lb (77 kg)	2003-08-27	Pomona, New York	American International (AHA)	—
21	(United States)	Devon Carlstorm	Junior	D	6' 3" (1.91 m)	185 lb (84 kg)	2002-03-05	Palm Beach Gardens, Florida	Aberdeen Wings (NAHL)	—
22	(United States)	Jordin Palmer	Freshman	D	6' 2" (1.88 m)	194 lb (88 kg)	2004-01-06	Auburn, New Hampshire	Rochester Jr. Americans (NAHL)	—
24	(United States)	Anthony Galante	Junior	F	5' 11" (1.8 m)	175 lb (79 kg)	2002-04-18	Morganville, New Jersey	Johnstown Tomahawks (NAHL)	—
26	(United States)	Evan Orr	Senior	D	5' 11" (1.8 m)	185 lb (84 kg)	2001-01-09	Shelby Township, Michigan	Michigan Tech (CCHA)	—
28	(United States)	Matthew Rafalski	Freshman	D	6' 1" (1.85 m)	190 lb (86 kg)	2004-06-12	Waupaca, Wisconsin	Bismarck Bobcats (NAHL)	—
29	(United States)	Connor Androlewicz	Graduate	G	6' 2" (1.88 m)	194 lb (88 kg)	2000-11-28	St. Louis, Missouri	Maine (HEA)	—
30	(United States)	Dylan Ghaemi	Senior	G	6' 4" (1.93 m)	200 lb (91 kg)	2001-12-30	Fairport, New York	Järvso (Hockeytrean)	—
31	(Latvia)	Linards Lipskis	Sophomore	G	6' 2" (1.88 m)	190 lb (86 kg)	2003-07-03	Riga, Latvia	Wisconsin Windigo (NAHL)	—
34	(United States)	Teddy Lagerbäck	Senior	F	6' 1" (1.85 m)	196 lb (89 kg)	2001-08-21	Minnetonka, Minnesota	Miami (NCHC)	—
44	(Canada)	Zach Nicolas	Sophomore	F	6' 5" (1.96 m)	203 lb (92 kg)	2004-02-10	Winnipeg, Manitoba	Winkler Flyers (MJHL)	—
55	(United States)	Dominick Campione	Junior	D	5' 11" (1.8 m)	154 lb (70 kg)	2002-11-25	Kohler, Wisconsin	Brooks Bandits (AJHL)	—
71	(United States)	Matthew Romer	Junior	F	5' 9" (1.75 m)	178 lb (81 kg)	2002-09-01	Chicago, Illinois	Northern Michigan (CCHA)	—

== Skyhawks in the NHL ==
Stonehill has yet to have an alumnus reach the NHL.

== See also ==
- Stonehill Skyhawks
