= Mark Adamek =

American ice hockey player

- Born: May 2, 1982 (age 43); Hollister, California, United States
- Height: 6 ft 4 in (193 cm)
- Weight: 212 lb (96 kg; 15 st 2 lb)
- Position: Defense
- Shot: Right
- Played for: ECHL; San Diego Gulls; Stockton Thunder; Utah Grizzlies; CHL; Wichita Thunder
- NHL draft: Undrafted
- Playing career: 2006–2012

Mark Adamek (born May 2, 1982) is an American former professional ice hockey defenseman. Adamek last played professionally with the Utah Grizzlies of the ECHL.

Adamek was drafted as a youth 177th overall in the 1999 QMJHL Entry Draft by the Quebec Remparts. Adamek opted instead to attend the Lake Superior State University where he played college hockey with the Lake Superior State Lakers men's ice hockey team before turning professional with the San Diego Gulls near the end of the 2005–06 ECHL season. Since retirement, Adamek has been the head coach for the Milwaukee Jr. Admirals U18 team since 2017, a Tier 1 Elite Hockey League team in Milwaukee, WI

== Career statistics ==
=== Regular season and playoffs ===
			Regular season					Playoffs
Season	Team	League	GP	G	A	Pts	PIM	GP	G	A	Pts	PIM
1999–00	Grand Rapids Bearcats	NAHL	47	2	6	8	67	—	—	—	—	—
2000–01	Springfield Jr. Blues	NAHL	16	0	3	3	12	—	—	—	—	—
2000–01	St. Louis Sting	NAHL	28	2	17	19	29	—	—	—	—	—
2000–01	Rochester Mustangs	NAHL	2	0	0	0	0	—	—	—	—	—
2001–02	Springfield Spirit	NAHL	56	6	22	28	75	—	—	—	—	—
2002–03	Lake Superior State University	NCAA	38	0	3	3	22	—	—	—	—	—
2003–04	Lake Superior State University	NCAA	35	0	2	2	6	—	—	—	—	—
2004–05	Lake Superior State University	NCAA	30	0	5	5	41	—	—	—	—	—
2005–06	Lake Superior State University	NCAA	18	0	3	3	6	—	—	—	—	—
2005–06	San Diego Gulls	ECHL	11	0	2	2	8	—	—	—	—	—
2006–07	Stockton Thunder	ECHL	63	2	4	6	56	6	1	0	1	0
2007–08	Stockton Thunder	ECHL	63	3	9	12	41	6	0	0	0	4
2008–09	Stockton Thunder	ECHL	55	1	11	12	42	14	1	2	3	4
2009–10	Wichita Thunder	CHL	45	2	15	17	27	—	—	—	—	—
2010–11	Park City Pioneers	USSED	5	1	1	2	4	—	—	—	—	—
2011–12	Utah Sr. Grizzlies	USSED	7	3	11	14	6	—	—	—	—	—
2011–12	Utah Grizzlies	ECHL	3	0	1	1	0	—	—	—	—	—
2012–13	Park City Pioneers	MWHL	2	1	2	3	0	—	—	—	—	—
2013–14	Park City Pioneers	MWHL	5	0	2	2	4	—	—	—	—	—
ECHL totals			200	6	27	33	147	26	2	2	4	8
CHL totals			45	2	15	17	27	—	—	—	—	—
