= 1990–91 NAJHL season =

- League: North American Junior Hockey League
- Sport: Ice hockey
- Games: 40
- Teams: 8

Regular season
- Season champions: Detroit Compuware Ambassadors

Robertson Cup Playoffs
- Finals champions: Kalamazoo Jr. Wings

NAHL seasons
- ← 1989–90 1991–92 →

The 1990–91 NAJHL season was the seventh season of the North American Junior Hockey League. The Detroit Compuware Ambassadors won the regular season championship while the Kalamazoo Jr. Wings won the Robertson Cup.

== Member changes ==
- The Melvindale Blades and NACE folded. By some accounts, NACE relocated and became the Dearborn Magic, however, the Johnstown Tomahawks, who are the successors to the Magic, list this season as their inaugural year.
- The Lytes Rustlers, a travel team of players from the west coast, joined the league. The team played their home games in St. Louis.
- The Dearborn Magic joined the league as an expansion franchise.
- The Bloomfield Jets relocated and became the Lakeland Jets.

== Regular season ==
The standings at the end of the regular season were as follows:

Note: x = clinched playoff berth; y = clinched division title; z = clinched regular season title

=== Standings ===
==== Eastern Division ====
Team	GP	W	L	T	Pts	GF	GA
xyz – Detroit Compuware Ambassadors	40	30	5	5	65	–	–
x – Detroit Jr. Wings	40	24	11	5	53	–	–
Niagara Scenic	40	12	21	7	31	–	–
Lytes Rustlers	40	1	38	1	3	–	–

==== Western Division ====
Team	GP	W	L	T	Pts	GF	GA
xy – Kalamazoo Jr. Wings	40	26	8	6	58	–	–
x – Indianapolis Junior Ice	40	25	9	6	56	–	–
Lakeland Jets	40	16	17	7	39	–	–
Dearborn Magic	40	6	31	3	15	–	–

== Robertson Cup playoffs ==
Results missing

Kalamazoo Jr. Wings won the Robertson Cup.
