= 1995–96 NAHL season =

- League: North American Hockey League
- Sport: Ice hockey
- Games: 46
- Teams: 8

Regular season
- Season champions: Springfield Jr. Blues

Robertson Cup Playoffs
- Finals champions: Springfield Jr. Blues

NAHL seasons
- ← 1994–95 1996–97 →

The 1995–96 NAHL season was the 12th season of the North American Hockey League. The Springfield Jr. Blues won the regular season championship and the Robertson Cup.

== Member changes ==
- The Lakeland Jets relocated and became the Soo Indians.
- The Saginaw Gears relocated and became the Gaylord Grizzlies in December.
- The Indianapolis Junior Ice folded.

== Regular season ==
The standings at the end of the regular season were as follows:

Note: x = clinched playoff berth; y = clinched regular season title

=== Standings ===
Team	GP	W	L	T	OTL	Pts	GF	GA
xy – Springfield Jr. Blues	46	34	7	4	1	74	270	147
x – Detroit Compuware Ambassadors	46	29	12	5	0	63	191	153
x – Detroit Freeze	46	25	16	4	1	55	211	177
x – Soo Indians	46	22	18	4	2	50	167	173
x – Cleveland Jr. Barons	46	22	19	3	2	49	218	192
x – Saginaw Gears / Gaylord Grizzlies	46	20	19	4	3	47	167	170
x – Danville Wings	46	14	29	2	1	31	158	220
x – Dearborn Heights Nationals	46	4	36	2	4	14	133	283

== Robertson Cup playoffs ==
Quarterfinal (Best-of-3)
1	Springfield Jr. Blues	2
8	Dearborn Heights Nationals	0
2	Detroit Compuware Ambassadors	2
7	Danville Wings	0
3	Detroit Freeze	2
6	Gaylord Grizzlies	0
4	Soo Indians	2
5	Cleveland Jr. Barons	0

Semifinal (Best-of-3)
1	Springfield Jr. Blues	2
4	Soo Indians	0
2	Detroit Compuware Ambassadors	2
3	Detroit Freeze	0

Championship (Best-of-3)
1	Springfield Jr. Blues	2
2	Detroit Compuware Ambassadors	1

Note: * denotes overtime period(s)
