= 1996–97 NAHL season =

- League: North American Hockey League
- Sport: Ice hockey
- Duration: Regular season September 1996 – April 1997; Postseason; April 11 – April 27, 1997
- Games: 46
- Teams: 8

Regular season
- Season champions: Springfield Jr. Blues
- Season MVP: Jason Deskins (Detroit Compuware Ambassadors)
- Top scorer: Ryan Fultz (Cleveland Jr. Barons)

Robertson Cup Playoffs
- Finals champions: Springfield Jr. Blues
- Runners-up: Detroit Compuware Ambassadors

NAHL seasons
- ← 1995–96 1997–98 →

The 1996–97 NAHL season was the 13th season of the North American Hockey League. The Springfield Jr. Blues won the regular season championship and the Robertson Cup.

== Member changes ==
- The Dearborn Heights Nationals relocated and became the St. Louis Sting.

== Regular season ==
The standings at the end of the regular season were as follows:

Note: x = clinched playoff berth; y = clinched regular season title

=== Standings ===
Team	GP	W	L	OTL	Pts	GF	GA
xy – Springfield Jr. Blues	46	35	10	1	71	230	144
x – Detroit Compuware Ambassadors	46	33	10	3	69	217	148
x – Soo Indians	46	28	18	0	56	169	159
x – Danville Wings	46	26	16	4	56	221	165
x – Detroit Freeze	46	21	23	2	44	184	186
x – Gaylord Grizzlies	46	16	26	4	36	165	206
x – Cleveland Jr. Barons	46	17	27	2	36	171	224
x – St. Louis Sting	46	8	38	0	16	123	248

=== Statistics ===
==== Scoring leaders ====
The following players led the league in regular season points at the completion of all regular season games.

Player	Team	GP	G	A	Pts	PIM
Ryan Fultz	Springfield Jr. Blues	46	42	31	73	22
Jason Deskins	Detroit Compuware Ambassadors	43	37	34	71	73
Max Mnatsakanov	Detroit Freeze	44	27	40	67	131
Frank Nardella	Springfield Jr. Blues	44	20	45	65	98
Ryan Zoller	Springfield Jr. Blues	45	27	37	64	159
David Legwand	Detroit Compuware Ambassadors	44	21	41	62	58
Bobby Weston	Detroit Freeze	41	23	38	61	124
Tim Hearon	Gaylord Grizzlies	46	20	35	55	30
Rob Gubala	Danville Wings	45	30	24	54	40
Yevgeni Dubravin	Springfield Jr. Blues	46	23	31	54	30

== Robertson Cup playoffs ==
Quarterfinal (Best-of-3)
1	Springfield Jr. Blues	6	6	-
8	St. Louis Sting	2	3	-
2	Detroit Compuware Ambassadors	6	5	-
7	Cleveland Jr. Barons	3	3	-
3	Soo Indians	5	4*	-
6	Gaylord Grizzlies	2	3	-
4	Danville Wings	4	5	6*
5	Detroit Freeze	5	2	5

Semifinal (Best-of-3)
1	Springfield Jr. Blues	5	3*	-
4	Danville Wings	2	2	-
2	Detroit Compuware Ambassadors	4	4	-
3	Soo Indians	2	2	-

Championship (Best-of-3)
1	Springfield Jr. Blues	3	1	3
2	Detroit Compuware Ambassadors	1	2	1

Note: * denotes overtime period(s)
