= 1991–92 NAJHL season =

- League: North American Junior Hockey League
- Sport: Ice hockey
- Games: 40
- Teams: 8

Regular season
- Season champions: Detroit Compuware Ambassadors

Robertson Cup Playoffs
- Finals champions: Detroit Compuware Ambassadors

NAHL seasons
- ← 1990–91 1992–93 →

The 1991–92 NAJHL season was the eighth season of the North American Junior Hockey League. The Detroit Compuware Ambassadors won the regular season championship and the Robertson Cup.

== Member changes ==
- The Lytes Rustlers withdrew from the league.
- The Saginaw Gears joined the league as an expansion franchise.
- The Dearborn Magic rebranded as the Michigan Nationals.

== Regular season ==
The standings at the end of the regular season were as follows:

Note: x = clinched playoff berth; y = clinched division title; z = clinched regular season title

=== Standings ===
==== Eastern Division ====
Team	GP	W	L	T	OTL	Pts	GF	GA
xyz – Detroit Compuware Ambassadors	40	29	8	3	2	63	229	122
x – Detroit Freeze	40	20	17	3	4	47	189	170
Niagara Scenic	40	15	22	3	1	34	144	190
Saginaw Gears	40	9	39	1	2	21	138	220

==== Western Division ====
Team	GP	W	L	T	OTL	Pts	GF	GA
xy – Indianapolis Junior Ice	40	27	9	4	1	59	188	96
x – Lakeland Jets	40	22	16	2	0	46	169	181
Kalamazoo Jr. Wings	40	15	22	3	1	34	168	193
Michigan Nationals	40	11	24	5	2	29	149	202

== Robertson Cup playoffs ==
Results missing

Detroit Compuware Ambassadors won the Robertson Cup.
