= Greg Rallo =

American ice hockey player (born 1981)

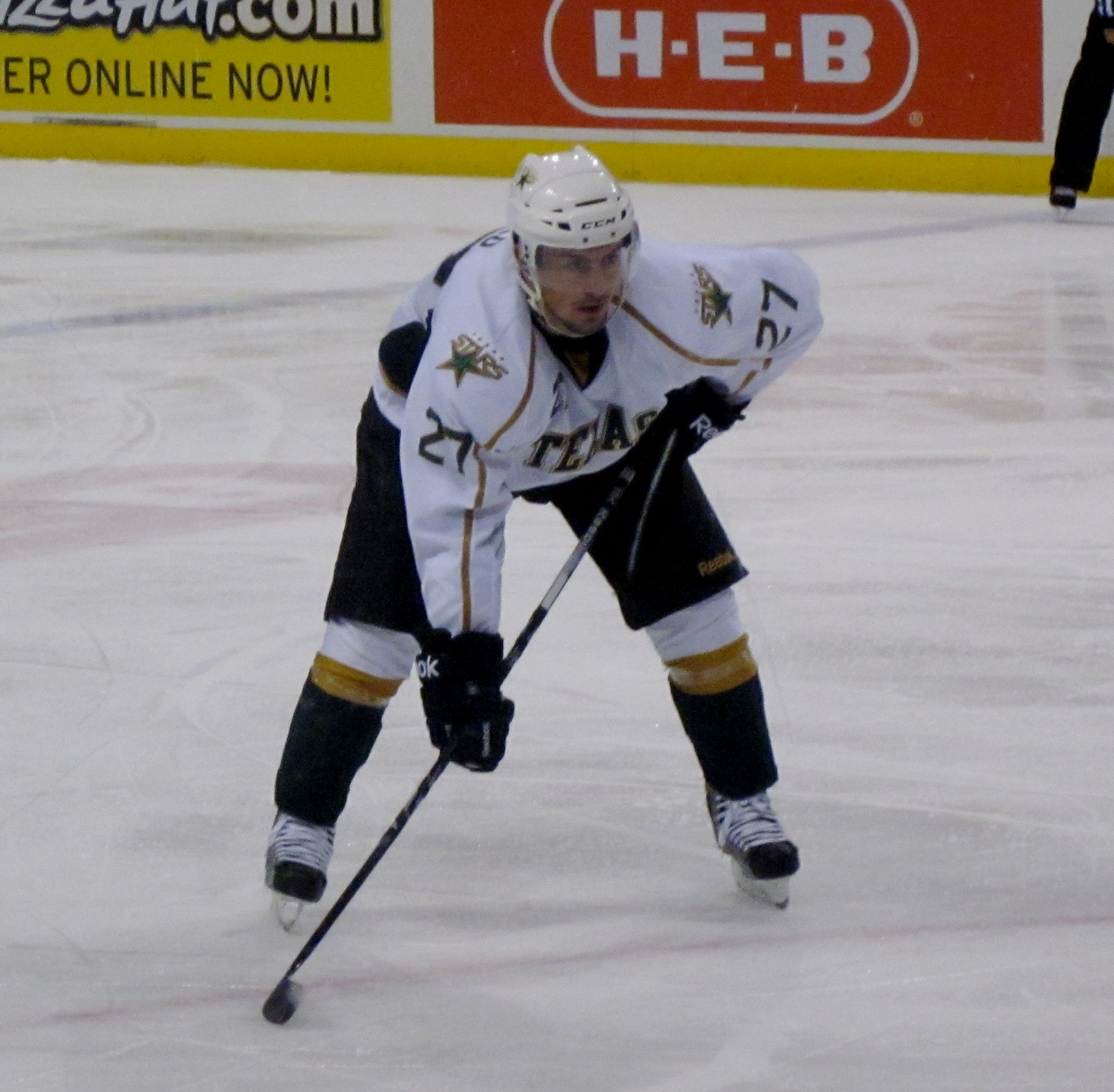
- Born: August 26, 1981 (age 45) Gurnee, Illinois, U.S.
- Height: 6 ft 0 in (183 cm)
- Weight: 195 lb (88 kg; 13 st 13 lb)
- Position: Center
- Shot: Right
- Played for: Florida Panthers; Iserlohn Roosters
- NHL draft: Undrafted
- Playing career: 2006–2018

Greg Rallo (born August 26, 1981) is an American former professional ice hockey player who predominantly played in the American Hockey League (AHL). He appeared in 11 games in the National Hockey League (NHL) with the Florida Panthers.

== Playing career ==
Undrafted, Rallo played two seasons with the Texas Stars before he was signed to a one-year contract by the Florida Panthers on July 2, 2011. In the 2011–12 season, he made his long-awaited debut in the NHL as a 30-year-old in a 3-2 overtime victory against the Carolina Hurricanes on December 18, 2011. He was re-signed to a one-year, two way contract extension on July 1, 2012.

After three seasons within the Panthers organization, Rallo returned to the Texas Stars on a one-year AHL contract on August 1, 2014. After two years playing for the Stars, he decided to venture to Europe, signing on a one-year contract for the German club, Iserlohn Roosters of the Deutsche Eishockey Liga on August 12, 2016. In the 2016–17 season with the Roosters, Rallo played on the top two scoring lines, finishing 5th in scoring with 25 points in 45 games as Iserlohn finished out of playoff contention. On March 3, 2017, it was announced that Rallo's contract would not be renewed.

On July 5, 2017, Rallo signed a one-year AHL contract in for his third stint with the Texas Stars. Limited to 29 games through injury in the 2017–18 season, Rallo completed his final professional year with 5 goals and 11 points.

Having played 12 professional seasons, Rallo announced his retirement in accepting an assistant coaching role with the Milwaukee Admirals of the AHL on July 12, 2018.

== Career statistics ==
			Regular season					Playoffs
Season	Team	League	GP	G	A	Pts	PIM	GP	G	A	Pts	PIM
2000–01	Springfield Jr. Blues	NAHL	53	43	25	68	78	—	—	—	—	—
2001–02	Springfield Jr. Blues	NAHL	52	40	29	69	102	—	—	—	—	—
2002–03	Ferris State University	CCHA	41	15	14	29	46	—	—	—	—	—
2003–04	Ferris State University	CCHA	38	7	11	18	42	—	—	—	—	—
2004–05	Ferris State University	CCHA	33	7	15	22	22	—	—	—	—	—
2005–06	Ferris State University	CCHA	40	17	22	39	30	—	—	—	—	—
2005–06	Idaho Steelheads	ECHL	7	2	2	4	2	7	2	1	3	4
2006–07	Idaho Steelheads	ECHL	37	13	18	31	43	14	8	3	11	12
2006–07	Iowa Stars	AHL	28	3	2	5	25	2	1	0	1	2
2007–08	Idaho Steelheads	ECHL	39	17	19	36	47	—	—	—	—	—
2007–08	Albany River Rats	AHL	5	0	0	0	0	—	—	—	—	—
2007–08	Rockford IceHogs	AHL	2	0	0	0	0	—	—	—	—	—
2007–08	Manitoba Moose	AHL	13	4	5	9	2	3	0	0	0	9
2008–09	Manitoba Moose	AHL	55	4	5	9	17	20	2	2	4	9
2009–10	Texas Stars	AHL	69	19	25	44	25	24	3	7	10	0
2010–11	Texas Stars	AHL	78	26	28	54	46	6	1	1	2	8
2011–12	San Antonio Rampage	AHL	72	22	20	42	18	4	0	2	2	0
2011–12	Florida Panthers	NHL	1	0	0	0	0	—	—	—	—	—
2012–13	San Antonio Rampage	AHL	66	23	17	40	36	—	—	—	—	—
2012–13	Florida Panthers	NHL	10	1	0	1	2	—	—	—	—	—
2013–14	San Antonio Rampage	AHL	69	10	24	34	26	—	—	—	—	—
2014–15	Texas Stars	AHL	72	27	22	49	38	3	0	1	1	4
2015–16	Texas Stars	AHL	57	22	22	44	16	1	0	0	0	0
2016–17	Iserlohn Roosters	DEL	45	13	12	25	18	—	—	—	—	—
2017–18	Texas Stars	AHL	29	5	6	11	16	—	—	—	—	—
AHL totals			615	165	176	341	264	63	7	13	20	32
NHL totals			11	1	0	1	2	—	—	—	—	—
