= Jim Slater (ice hockey) =

American ice hockey player (born 1982)

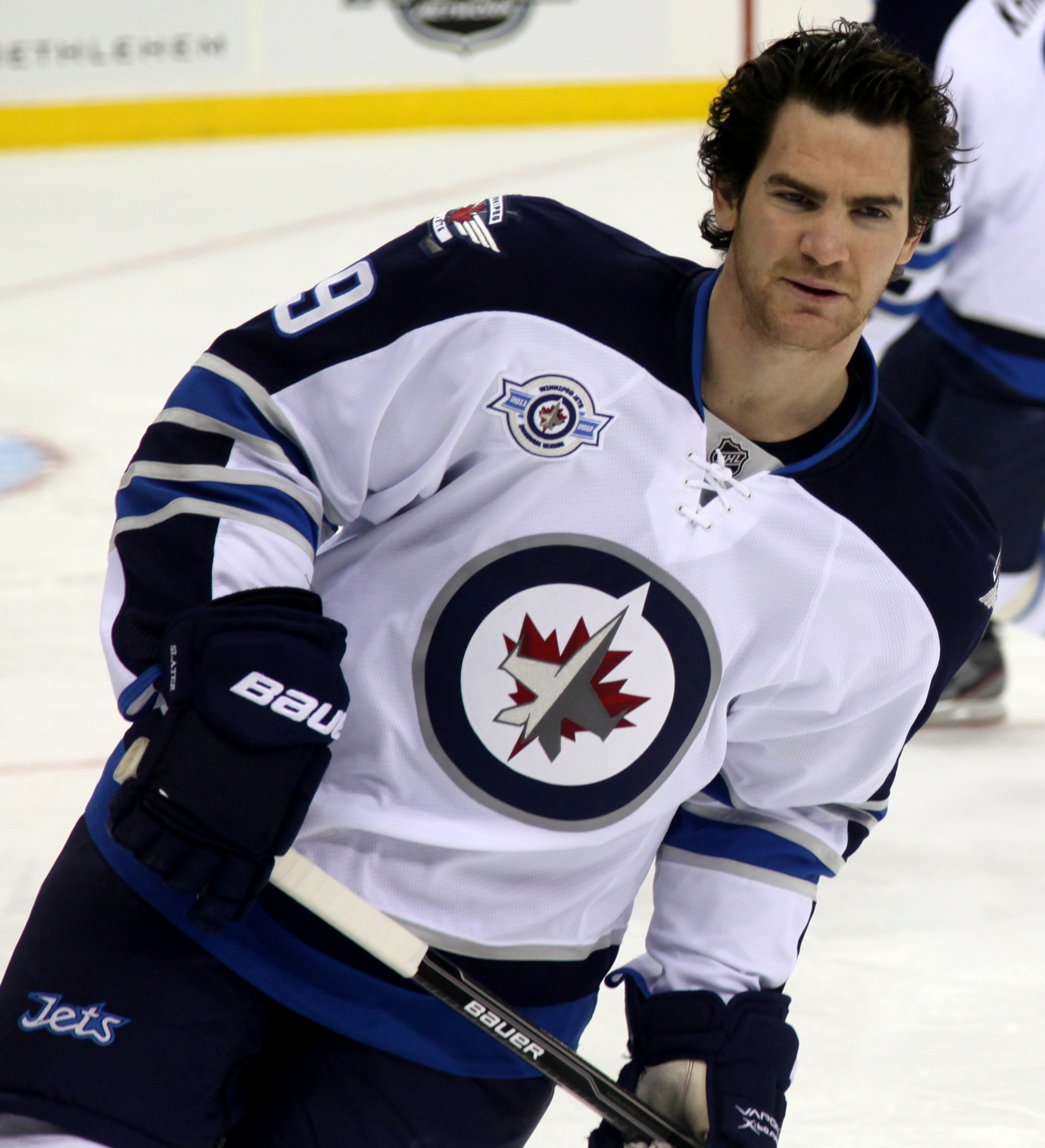
- Slater with the Winnipeg Jets in January 2012
- Born: December 9, 1982 (age 43) Lapeer, Michigan, U.S.
- Height: 6 ft 0 in (183 cm)
- Weight: 195 lb (88 kg; 13 st 13 lb)
- Position: Center
- Shot: Left
- Played for: Atlanta Thrashers; Winnipeg Jets; Genève-Servette HC; HC Fribourg-Gottéron
- National team: United States
- NHL draft: 30th overall, 2002; Atlanta Thrashers
- Playing career: 2005–2019
- Coaching career

Biographical details
- Education: Michigan State University

Coaching career (HC unless noted)
- 2019–2021: Michigan State (assistant)
- 2019–present: Washington Capitals (development)

James Parker Slater (born December 9, 1982) is an American former professional ice hockey forward. He spent the entirety of his National Hockey League (NHL) career with the Atlanta Thrashers/Winnipeg Jets organization.

== Playing career ==
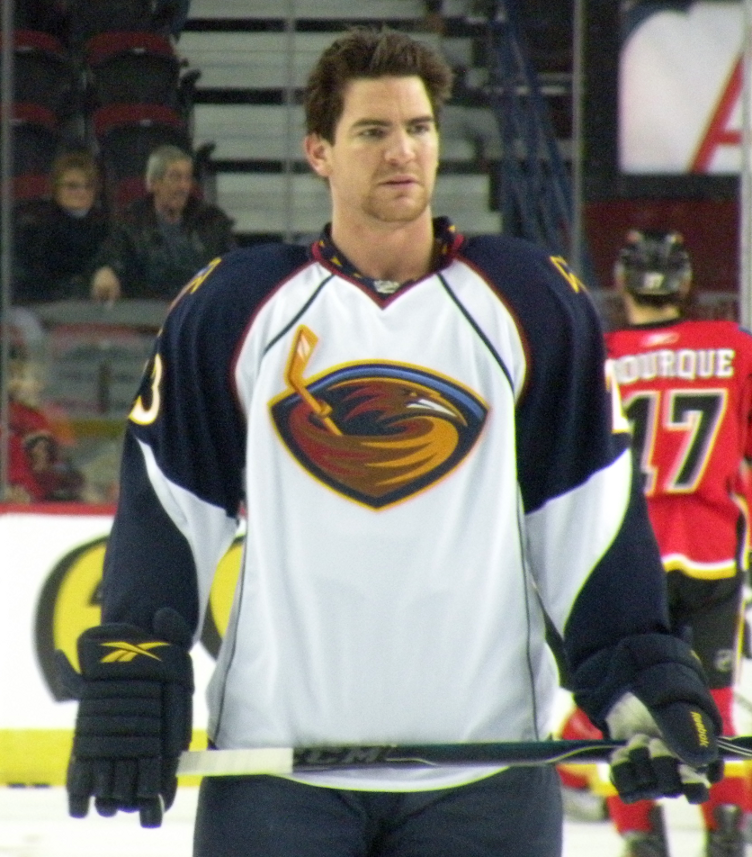
Slater as a member of the Atlanta Thrashers in December 2009

As a youth, Slater played in the 1996 Quebec International Pee-Wee Hockey Tournament with the Detroit Little Caesars minor ice hockey team.

Slater was drafted in the first round, 30th overall, by the Atlanta Thrashers in the 2002 NHL entry draft. He played for the Michigan State Spartans for four years. He joined the Thrashers for their 2005–06 season opener before being demoted to their AHL affiliate, the Chicago Wolves, for four games. After he scored two points in those four games, he was called up and stayed with the Thrashers for the rest of the season. Slater joined the Winnipeg Jets in 2011 upon the Atlanta Thrashers' relocation there. On June 13, 2012, Slater renewed his contract with the Jets, signing a 3-year, $4.8 million contract. Slater was the longest tenured player with the Jets/Thrashers organization, having played with them since the 2005-06 season up to the 2014-15 season; Blake Wheeler has since surpassed him, having played 897 games with the franchise until his departure in the 2023 offseason.

On September 29, 2015, he signed with Genève-Servette of the National League A (NLA). His NLA debut was delayed due to a work permit issue. Slater eventually made his debut for Geneva on October 9, 2015 in Kloten and scored his first goal that same day. On January 9, 2016, Slater was severely hit to the head by teammate Matt D'Agostini and suffered a concussion and a severe cervical spine injury. He eventually returned to game action a few weeks later. Slater was suspended one game for checking HC Lugano's Julien Vauclair to the head in Game 2 of the NLA semi-finals. On May 27, 2016, Slater was signed to a one-year contract extension by Geneva. Slater underwent foot surgery in the off-season and missed most of training camp.

On September 1, 2016, Slater was named captain of Genève-Servette. Slater missed the end of the 2016–17 regular season as a healthy scratch, after displaying poor performances and a lack of energy. Daniel Vukovic took over the captaincy before Slater was inserted back in the lineup for the start of the 2017 playoffs. Slater played his last game for Geneva on March 7, 2017 in game 2 of the 1/4 finals, before being taken out of the lineup as a healthy scratch. Cody Almond assumed the captaincy as Vukovic was suspended.

On July 21, 2017, as a free agent, Slater agreed to a one-year contract with HC Fribourg-Gottéron of the National League (NL). He spent two seasons with the club, skating in 93 games.

On September 3, 2018, Slater was named to Michigan State's staff as a volunteer assistant coach, effectively ending his professional hockey career.

On September 20, 2019, he joined the Washington Capitals' Player Development Department.

== Personal life ==
His father, Bill Slater, was a defensive lineman in the National Football League (NFL) for the Minnesota Vikings and the New England Patriots.

== Career statistics ==
=== Regular season and playoffs ===
| | | | Regular season | | | | | Playoffs |
| Season | Team | League | GP | G | A | Pts | PIM | GP | G | A | Pts | PIM |
|---|---|---|---|---|---|---|---|---|---|---|---|---|
| 1998–99 | Cleveland Jr. Barons | NAHL | 50 | 13 | 20 | 33 | 58 | 2 | 0 | 0 | 0 | 2 |
| 1998–99 | US NTDP U18 | USDP | 3 | 0 | 1 | 1 | 0 | — | — | — | — | — |
| 1999–2000 | Cleveland Jr. Barons | NAHL | 56 | 35 | 50 | 85 | 129 | 3 | 1 | 3 | 4 | 4 |
| 2000–01 | Cleveland Jr. Barons | NAHL | 48 | 27 | 37 | 64 | 122 | 6 | 6 | 6 | 12 | 6 |
| 2001–02 | Michigan State University | CCHA | 37 | 11 | 21 | 32 | 50 | — | — | — | — | — |
| 2002–03 | Michigan State University | CCHA | 37 | 18 | 26 | 44 | 26 | — | — | — | — | — |
| 2003–04 | Michigan State University | CCHA | 42 | 19 | 29 | 48 | 38 | — | — | — | — | — |
| 2004–05 | Michigan State University | CCHA | 41 | 16 | 32 | 48 | 30 | — | — | — | — | — |
| 2005–06 | Chicago Wolves | AHL | 4 | 0 | 2 | 2 | 2 | — | — | — | — | — |
| 2005–06 | Atlanta Thrashers | NHL | 71 | 10 | 10 | 20 | 46 | — | — | — | — | — |
| 2006–07 | Atlanta Thrashers | NHL | 74 | 5 | 14 | 19 | 62 | 4 | 0 | 0 | 0 | 2 |
| 2007–08 | Atlanta Thrashers | NHL | 69 | 8 | 5 | 13 | 41 | — | — | — | — | — |
| 2007–08 | Chicago Wolves | AHL | 3 | 0 | 0 | 0 | 0 | — | — | — | — | — |
| 2008–09 | Atlanta Thrashers | NHL | 60 | 8 | 10 | 18 | 52 | — | — | — | — | — |
| 2009–10 | Atlanta Thrashers | NHL | 61 | 11 | 7 | 18 | 60 | — | — | — | — | — |
| 2010–11 | Atlanta Thrashers | NHL | 36 | 5 | 7 | 12 | 19 | — | — | — | — | — |
| 2011–12 | Winnipeg Jets | NHL | 78 | 13 | 8 | 21 | 42 | — | — | — | — | — |
| 2012–13 | Winnipeg Jets | NHL | 26 | 1 | 1 | 2 | 19 | — | — | — | — | — |
| 2013–14 | Winnipeg Jets | NHL | 27 | 1 | 1 | 2 | 8 | — | — | — | — | — |
| 2014–15 | Winnipeg Jets | NHL | 82 | 5 | 8 | 13 | 58 | 4 | 0 | 0 | 0 | 0 |
| 2015–16 | Genève–Servette HC | NLA | 32 | 15 | 13 | 28 | 22 | 10 | 3 | 2 | 5 | 41 |
| 2016–17 | Genève–Servette HC | NLA | 44 | 8 | 15 | 23 | 54 | 2 | 0 | 0 | 0 | 0 |
| 2017–18 | HC Fribourg–Gottéron | NL | 45 | 14 | 17 | 31 | 67 | 1 | 0 | 0 | 0 | 0 |
| 2018–19 | HC Fribourg–Gottéron | NL | 48 | 11 | 20 | 31 | 117 | — | — | — | — | — |
| NHL totals | | | 584 | 67 | 71 | 138 | 407 | 8 | 0 | 0 | 0 | 2 |
| NLA/NL totals | | | 169 | 48 | 65 | 113 | 260 | 13 | 3 | 2 | 5 | 41 |

=== International ===
| Year | Team | Event | Result | GP | G | A | Pts | PIM |
|---|---|---|---|---|---|---|---|---|
| 2002 | United States | WJC | 5th | 7 | 1 | 4 | 5 | 8 |
| 2006 | United States | WC | 7th | 7 | 0 | 1 | 1 | 2 |
| 2012 | United States | WC | 7th | 8 | 2 | 1 | 3 | 6 |
| 2018 | United States | OG | 7th | 3 | 1 | 0 | 1 | 0 |
| Junior totals | | | | 7 | 1 | 4 | 5 | 8 |
| Senior totals | | | | 18 | 3 | 2 | 5 | 8 |

== Awards and honors ==
| Award | Year |
NAHL
| All-League First All-Star | 2000, 2001 |
College
| All-CCHA Rookie Team | 2001-02 |
| All-CCHA First Team | 2002-03, 2003-04 |
| AHCA West Second-Team All-American | 2003–04 |
NHL
| Staffmax Community Service Award (Winnipeg Jets) | 2012 |

Sporting positions
| Preceded by Kari Lehtonen | Atlanta Thrashers first-round draft pick 2002 | Succeeded by Braydon Coburn |
