= 1997–98 NAHL season =

- League: North American Hockey League
- Sport: Ice hockey
- Duration: Regular season September 1997 – March 1998; Postseason; April 9 – April 24, 1998
- Games: 56
- Teams: 9

Regular season
- Season champions: Detroit Compuware Ambassadors
- Top scorer: David Del Monte (Chicago Freeze)

Robertson Cup Playoffs
- Finals champions: Detroit Compuware Ambassadors
- Runners-up: USNTDP

NAHL seasons
- ← 1996–97 1998–99 →

The 1997–98 NAHL season was the 14th season of the North American Hockey League. The season ran from September 1997 to April 1998 with a 56-game schedule for each team. The Detroit Compuware Ambassadors won the regular season championship and went on to defeat the USNTDP 2 games to 0 for the Robertson Cup.

== Member changes ==
- The Detroit Freeze relocated and became the Chicago Freeze.
- The league admitted the USA Hockey National Team Development Program (USNTDP) under-18 team to the league.

== Regular season ==
The standings at the end of the regular season were as follows:

Note: x = clinched playoff berth; y = clinched regular season title

=== Standings ===
| Team | GP | W | L | OTL | Pts | GF | GA |
|---|---|---|---|---|---|---|---|
| xy – Springfield Jr. Blues | 56 | 42 | 12 | 2 | 86 | 274 | 175 |
| x – Detroit Compuware Ambassadors | 56 | 39 | 16 | 1 | 79 | 219 | 151 |
| x – Soo Indians | 56 | 35 | 20 | 1 | 71 | 203 | 138 |
| x – Danville Wings | 56 | 31 | 20 | 5 | 67 | 233 | 218 |
| x – Chicago Freeze | 56 | 28 | 24 | 4 | 60 | 202 | 208 |
| x – USNTDP | 56 | 25 | 29 | 2 | 52 | 184 | 198 |
| x – St. Louis Sting | 56 | 23 | 32 | 1 | 47 | 188 | 237 |
| x – Gaylord Grizzlies | 56 | 14 | 36 | 6 | 34 | 159 | 228 |
| Cleveland Jr. Barons | 56 | 15 | 38 | 3 | 33 | 160 | 269 |

=== Statistics ===
==== Scoring leaders ====
The following players led the league in regular season points at the completion of all regular season games.

| Player | Team | GP | G | A | Pts | PIM |
|---|---|---|---|---|---|---|
| David Del Monte | Chicago Freeze | 56 | 36 | 49 | 85 | 115 |
| Ryan Zoller | Springfield Jr. Blues | 56 | 36 | 41 | 77 | 252 |
| David Francis | Springfield Jr. Blues | 55 | 30 | 42 | 72 | 49 |
| Aaron Davis | Chicago Freeze | 49 | 26 | 43 | 69 | 95 |
| Raffie Kalajian | Springfield Jr. Blues | 56 | 37 | 28 | 65 | 97 |
| John Shouneyia | Detroit Compuware Ambassadors | 55 | 16 | 49 | 65 | 61 |
| Yevgeni Dubravin | Springfield Jr. Blues | 50 | 22 | 42 | 64 | 29 |
| Charlie Daniels | Danville Wings | 55 | 35 | 27 | 62 | 65 |
| Nick Field | Cleveland Jr. Barons | 56 | 34 | 28 | 62 | 38 |
| T. J. Latorre | Springfield Jr. Blues | 53 | 25 | 34 | 59 | 73 |

== Robertson Cup playoffs ==
Quarterfinal (Best-of-3)
1 | Springfield Jr. Blues | 7 | 6 | -
8 | Gaylord Grizzlies | 1 | 1 | -
2 | Detroit Compuware Ambassadors | 2 | 4 | 2
7 | St. Louis Sting | 4 | 1 | 1
3 | Soo Indians | 3 | 0 | -
6 | USNTDP | 4** | 3 | -
4 | Danville Wings | 3 | 3 | 5
5 | Chicago Freeze | 1 | 4** | 4

Semifinal (Best-of-3)
1 | Springfield Jr. Blues | 6 | 3 | 0
6 | USNTDP | 2 | 6 | 3
2 | Detroit Compuware Ambassadors | 4 | 5 | -
4 | Danville Wings | 3 | 2 | -

Championship (Best-of-3)
6 | USNTDP | 2 | 2 | -
2 | Detroit Compuware Ambassadors | 5 | 4 | -

Note: * denotes overtime period(s)
