= 1998–99 NAHL season =

- League: North American Hockey League
- Sport: Ice hockey
- Duration: Regular season September 1998 – March 1999; Postseason; April 1 – April 19, 1999
- Games: 56
- Teams: 9

Regular season
- Season champions: Detroit Compuware Ambassadors
- Season MVP: Ryan Miller (Soo Indians)
- Top scorer: Ryan Fultz (Cleveland Jr. Barons)

Robertson Cup Playoffs
- Finals champions: Detroit Compuware Ambassadors
- Runners-up: St. Louis Sting

NAHL seasons
- ← 1997–98 1999–2000 →

The 1998–99 NAHL season was the 15th season of the North American Hockey League. The season ran from September 1998 to April 1999 with a 56-game schedule for each team. The Detroit Compuware Ambassadors won the regular season championship and went on to defeat the St. Louis Sting 3 games to 0 for the Robertson Cup.

== Member changes ==
- The Gaylord Grizzlies relocated and became the Grand Rapids Bearcats.

== Regular season ==
The standings at the end of the regular season were as follows:

Note: x = clinched playoff berth; y = clinched division title; z = clinched regular season title

=== Standings ===
==== North Division ====
Team	GP	W	L	OTL	Pts	GF	GA
xyz – Detroit Compuware Ambassadors	56	39	11	6	84	214	147
x – Soo Indians	56	37	18	1	75	200	152
x – Grand Rapids Bearcats	56	27	29	0	54	175	197
x – Cleveland Jr. Barons	56	21	31	4	46	182	232
USNTDP	56	17	37	2	36	159	233

==== South Division ====
Team	GP	W	L	OTL	Pts	GF	GA
xy – St. Louis Sting	56	34	16	6	74	211	180
x – Springfield Jr. Blues	56	32	20	4	68	189	178
x – Chicago Freeze	56	28	24	4	60	189	178
x – Danville Wings	56	17	34	5	39	163	217

=== Statistics ===
==== Scoring leaders ====
The following players led the league in regular season points at the completion of all regular season games.

Player	Team	GP	G	A	Pts	PIM
Ryan Fultz	Cleveland Jr. Barons	56	40	49	89	98
John Shouneyia	Detroit Compuware Ambassadors	55	23	57	80	65
Jim Abbott	St. Louis Sting	56	45	33	78	70
Per Fernhall	St. Louis Sting	56	29	47	76	94
Aaron Davis	Grand Rapids Bearcats	55	29	42	71	110
Nic Boileau	Springfield Jr. Blues	55	33	37	70	16
Chris Gobert	Soo Indians	53	37	26	63	110
T. J. Latorre	Springfield Jr. Blues	43	30	32	62	80
Mark Mink	Detroit Compuware Ambassadors	53	30	32	62	70
Nick Jardine	Cleveland Jr. Barons	54	21	41	62	73

== Robertson Cup playoffs ==
Division Semifinals (Best-of-3)
E1	Detroit Compuware Ambassadors	5	7	-
E4	Cleveland Jr. Barons	3	2	-
E2	Soo Indians	3	7	-
E3	Grand Rapids Bearcats	0	2	-
W1	St. Louis Sting	5	1	4
W4	Danville Wings	4	5	0
W2	Springfield Jr. Blues	7	1	3
W3	Chicago Freeze	1	5	1

Semifinal (Best-of-3)
E1	Detroit Compuware Ambassadors	5	3	-
E2	Soo Indians	2	1	-
W1	St. Louis Sting	3	2	3
E2	Springfield Jr. Blues	2	6	0

Championship (Best-of-5)
E1	Detroit Compuware Ambassadors	7	5	4	-	-
W1	St. Louis Sting	4	1	0	-	-

Note: * denotes overtime period(s)
