= 2001–02 NAHL season =

- League: North American Hockey League
- Sport: Ice hockey
- Duration: Regular season September 2001 – March 2002; Postseason; April 12 – April 27, 2002
- Games: 56
- Teams: 11

Regular season
- Season champions: Detroit Compuware Ambassadors
- Season MVP: Brandon Kaleniecki (Cleveland Jr. Barons)
- Top scorer: Brandon Kaleniecki (Cleveland Jr. Barons)

Robertson Cup Playoffs
- Finals champions: Detroit Compuware Ambassadors
- Runners-up: Pittsburgh Forge

NAHL seasons
- ← 2000–01 2002–03 →

The 2001–02 NAHL season was the 18th season of the North American Hockey League. The season ran from September 2001 to April 2002 with a 56-game schedule for each team. The Detroit Compuware Ambassadors won the regular season championship and went on to defeat the Pittsburgh Forge 2 games to 0 for the Robertson Cup.

== Member changes ==
- The Pittsburgh Forge joined the NAHL as an expansion franchise.
- The St. Louis Sting relocated and became the Springfield Spirit.

== Regular season ==
The standings at the end of the regular season were as follows:

Note: x = clinched playoff berth; y = clinched division title; z = clinched regular season title

=== Standings ===
==== East Division ====
Team	GP	W	L	OTL	Pts	GF	GA
xyz – Detroit Compuware Ambassadors	56	42	9	5	89	233	138
x – Pittsburgh Forge	56	37	15	4	78	199	147
x – Cleveland Jr. Barons	56	35	18	3	73	223	196
x – Soo Indians	56	34	18	4	72	214	170
Capital Centre Pride	56	24	28	4	52	190	208
USNTDP	56	19	30	7	45	159	201

==== West Division ====
Team	GP	W	L	OTL	Pts	GF	GA
xy – Texas Tornado	56	40	13	3	83	208	135
x – Danville Wings	56	26	22	8	60	168	162
x – Springfield Spirit	56	23	29	4	50	182	222
x – Chicago Freeze	56	16	36	4	36	153	231
Springfield Jr. Blues	56	12	38	6	30	147	266

=== Statistics ===
==== Scoring leaders ====
The following players led the league in regular season points at the completion of all regular season games.

Player	Team	GP	G	A	Pts	PIM
Brandon Kaleniecki	Cleveland Jr. Barons	54	52	37	89	34
Dan Knapp	Detroit Compuware Ambassadors	53	26	62	88	96
Mike Falk	Detroit Compuware Ambassadors	55	44	31	75	64
Rocco Molinaro	Cleveland Jr. Barons	56	18	56	74	41
Tommy Goebel	Cleveland Jr. Barons	55	23	48	71	96
Greg Rallo	Springfield Jr. Blues	52	40	29	69	102
Matt Rutkowski	Detroit Compuware Ambassadors	52	25	39	64	87
Tony Zancanaro	Springfield Spirit	56	26	37	63	76
Geoff Smith	Texas Tornado	56	29	33	62	28
Justin Cross	Soo Indians	56	26	36	62	40

== Robertson Cup playoffs ==
Division Semifinals (Best-of-3)
E1	Detroit Compuware Ambassadors	7	2	-
E4	Soo Indians	6	1	-
W2	Danville Wings	1	1	-
W3	Springfield Spirit	3	5	-
W1	Texas Tornado	4	3	3
W4	Chicago Freeze	1	4*	1
E2	Pittsburgh Forge	3*	7	-
E3	Cleveland Jr. Barons	2	3	-

Semifinal (Best-of-3)
E1	Detroit Compuware Ambassadors	3	4	5*
W3	Springfield Spirit	4*	1	4
W1	Texas Tornado	1	3	2
E2	Pittsburgh Forge	3	1	3*

Championship (Best-of-3)
E1	Detroit Compuware Ambassadors	4	4*	-
E2	Pittsburgh Forge	0	3	-

Note: * denotes overtime period(s)
