= 1992–93 NAHL season =

- League: North American Hockey League
- Sport: Ice hockey
- Games: 40
- Teams: 8

Regular season
- Season champions: Kalamazoo Jr. Wings

Robertson Cup Playoffs
- Finals champions: Kalamazoo Jr. Wings

NAHL seasons
- ← 1991–92 1993–94 →

The 1992–93 NAHL season was the ninth season of the North American Hockey League. The Kalamazoo Jr. Wings won the regular season championship and the Robertson Cup.

== League rebranding ==
Entering the season, the 'North American Junior Hockey League' altered its name, becoming the North American Hockey League.

== Member changes ==
- The Detroit Jr. Wings withdrew from the league
- The Detroit Freeze join the league as an expansion franchise.

== Regular season ==
The standings at the end of the regular season were as follows:

Note: x = clinched playoff berth; y = clinched division title; z = clinched regular season title

=== Standings ===
==== Eastern Division ====
Team	GP	W	L	T	OTL	Pts	GF	GA
xy – Detroit Freeze	40	29	8	3	0	61	240	154
x – Niagara Scenic	40	14	12	8	6	36	158	197
Saginaw Gears	40	14	20	5	1	33	162	185
Detroit Compuware Ambassadors	40	10	22	6	2	26	140	194

==== Western Division ====
Team	GP	W	L	T	OTL	Pts	GF	GA
xyz – Kalamazoo Jr. Wings	40	31	6	3	0	65	230	124
x – Indianapolis Junior Ice	40	27	3	7	3	64	230	157
Michigan Nationals	40	15	19	5	1	35	178	216
Lakeland Jets	40	8	31	1	0	17	116	227

== Robertson Cup playoffs ==
Results missing

Kalamazoo Jr. Wings won the Robertson Cup.
