= 2002–03 NAHL season =

- League: North American Hockey League
- Sport: Ice hockey
- Duration: Regular season September 2002 – March 2003; Postseason; April 2 – April 25, 2003
- Games: 56
- Teams: 11

Regular season
- Season champions: Texas Tornado
- Season MVP: Tommy Goebel (Cleveland Jr. Barons)
- Top scorer: Matt Rutkowski (Detroit Compuware Ambassadors)

Robertson Cup Playoffs
- Finals champions: Pittsburgh Forge
- Runners-up: Texas Tornado

NAHL seasons
- ← 2001–02 2003–04 →

The 2002–03 NAHL season was the 19th season of the North American Hockey League. The season ran from September 2002 to April 2003 with a 56-game schedule for each team. The Pittsburgh Forge won the regular season championship and went on to defeat the Texas Tornado 3 games to 1 for the Robertson Cup.

== Member changes ==
None

== Regular season ==
The standings at the end of the regular season were as follows:

Note: x = clinched playoff berth; y = clinched division title; z = clinched regular season title

=== Standings ===
==== East Division ====
Team	GP	W	L	OTL	Pts	GF	GA
xyz – Pittsburgh Forge	56	43	9	4	90	208	111
x – Detroit Compuware Ambassadors	56	41	12	3	85	210	143
x – Soo Indians	56	30	22	4	64	187	152
x – Capital Centre Pride	56	26	25	5	57	178	209
USNTDP	56	16	38	2	34	177	238
Cleveland Jr. Barons	56	12	38	6	30	150	253

==== West Division ====
Team	GP	W	L	OTL	Pts	GF	GA
xy – Texas Tornado	56	41	13	2	84	214	142
x – Chicago Freeze	56	34	20	2	70	220	180
x – Danville Wings	56	30	19	7	67	198	157
x – Springfield Jr. Blues	56	20	27	9	49	191	237
Springfield Spirit	56	15	36	5	35	129	240

=== Statistics ===
==== Scoring leaders ====
The following players led the league in regular season points at the completion of all regular season games.

Player	Team	GP	G	A	Pts	PIM
Matt Rutkowski	Detroit Compuware Ambassadors	56	24	53	77	97
Frank Furdero	Detroit Compuware Ambassadors	45	26	43	69	24
Dan Riedel	Springfield Jr. Blues	56	29	38	67	110
Tommy Goebel	Cleveland Jr. Barons	49	32	32	64	76
Bryan Marshall	Danville Wings	53	31	31	62	45
Chris Lawrence	Pittsburgh Forge	56	30	32	62	48
Jason Tejchma	Danville Wings	56	21	41	62	39
Hank Carisio	Springfield Jr. Blues	53	25	36	61	251
Billy McCreary	Texas Tornado	43	27	33	60	135
Jeremy Hall	Danville Wings	55	40	17	57	59
Geoff Smith	Texas Tornado	47	23	34	57	89
Evan Salmela	Chicago Freeze	55	19	38	57	60

== Robertson Cup playoffs ==
Division Semifinals (Best-of-3)
E1	Pittsburgh Forge	3	1	-
E4	Capital Centre Pride	1	0	-
W2	Chicago Freeze	4	2	-
W3	Danville Wings	5	4	-
W1	Texas Tornado	2*	5	-
W4	Springfield Jr. Blues	1	2	-
E2	Detroit Compuware Ambassadors	3	3	-
E3	Soo Indians	2	1	-

Semifinal (Best-of-3)
E1	Pittsburgh Forge	3	3***	-
W3	Danville Wings	2	2	-
W1	Texas Tornado	2*	1	4
E2	Detroit Compuware Ambassadors	1	2	0

Championship (Best-of-5)
E1	Pittsburgh Forge	3	3	0	4	-
W1	Texas Tornado	1	1	3	2	-

Note: * denotes overtime period(s)
