= 1993–94 NAHL season =

- League: North American Hockey League
- Sport: Ice hockey
- Games: 46
- Teams: 10

Regular season
- Season champions: Niagara Scenic

Robertson Cup Playoffs
- Finals champions: Detroit Compuware Ambassadors

NAHL seasons
- ← 1992–93 1994–95 →

The 1993–94 NAHL season was the tenth season of the North American Hockey League. The Niagara Scenic won the regular season championship while the Detroit Compuware Ambassadors won the Robertson Cup.

== Member changes ==
- The Springfield Jr. Blues join the league as an expansion franchise.
- The Cleveland Jr. Barons were approved to join the NAHL from the Northeastern Jr. Hockey League.

== Regular season ==
The standings at the end of the regular season were as follows:

Note: x = clinched playoff berth; y = clinched division title; z = clinched regular season title

=== Standings ===
==== Eastern Division ====
Team	GP	W	L	T	OTL	Pts	GF	GA
xyz – Niagara Scenic	46	27	11	6	2	60	217	167
x – Detroit Compuware Ambassadors	46	27	12	5	2	59	213	162
x – Cleveland Jr. Barons	46	23	16	5	2	51	205	183
x – Saginaw Gears	46	17	19	8	2	42	185	183
Detroit Freeze	46	14	25	5	2	33	168	228

==== Western Division ====
Team	GP	W	L	T	OTL	Pts	GF	GA
xy – Kalamazoo Jr. Wings	46	26	17	1	0	53	210	190
x – Indianapolis Junior Ice	46	24	16	4	0	52	190	167
x – Michigan Nationals	46	18	22	4	2	40	155	189
x – Lakeland Jets	46	15	24	5	2	35	193	223
Springfield Jr. Blues	46	13	26	5	2	31	171	215

== Robertson Cup playoffs ==
Results missing

Detroit Compuware Ambassadors won the Robertson Cup.
