= Saginaw Gears =

The Saginaw Gears were two separate ice hockey teams from Saginaw, Michigan:

- Saginaw Gears (IHL), International Hockey League team (1972–83)
- Saginaw Gears (NAHL), North American Hockey League team (1991–95)
- Saginaw Gears (UHL), United Hockey League team (1998–99)
