= Jason Guerriero =

American ice hockey player

- Born: August 18, 1981 (age 45) Manorville, New York, USA
- Height: 5 ft 8 in (173 cm)
- Weight: 180 lb (82 kg; 12 st 12 lb)
- Position: Center
- Shot: Left
- Played for: Northeastern; Bridgeport Sound Tigers; Ilves; Milwaukee Admirals; Rockford IceHogs; EHC Visp; Fehérvár AV19; Schwenninger Wild Wings; SønderjyskE Ishockey
- Playing career: 2001–2011
- Coaching career

Current position
- Title: Regional Director of Player Development
- Team: USA Hockey

Biographical details
- Education: Northeastern University

Coaching career (HC unless noted)
- 2011–2013: Holy Cross (assistant)
- 2013–2015: Yale (assistant)
- 2015–2019: Brown (assistant)
- 2019–2022: Brown (associate)
- 2022–2025: Northeastern (assistant)

Jason Guerriero is an American ice hockey coach and former defenseman who was an All-American for Northeastern University.

== Career ==
Guerriero was a star player in juniors, leading the NAHL in scoring in 2001 and leading the Texas Tornado to a league championship. He began attending Northeastern University the following autumn and immediately became a major piece of the team's offense. Unfortunately, during his four-year tenure, the Huskies were never a top team. For his senior season Guerriero was named team captain and was named an All-American. Once the team's season was over, Guerriero signed with the Bridgeport Sound Tigers and finished the year in the AHL.

For his first full season as a professional, Guerriero played in Finland but returned to the AHL the following year. He spent most of the next two years playing for the Milwaukee Admirals, producing modest numbers. He returned to Europe in 2008 and split time between two teams. With the second, Alba Volán Székesfehérvár, he helped the team win the Hungarian championship. The next season he tied for the scoring lead for the Schwenninger Wild Wings and led the team to a regular season championship. Guerriero played one further season in Denmark before retiring.

In 2011, Guerriero began his coaching career as an assistant for Holy Cross. After two years, he took a similar position with Yale and then joined Brown two years afterwards. He stuck with the Bears and was promoted to Associate head coach in 2019.

Currently, Guerriero is the New England player development director for USA Hockey.

== Career statistics ==
=== Regular season and playoffs ===
			Regular season					Playoffs
Season	Team	League	GP	G	A	Pts	PIM	GP	G	A	Pts	PIM
1997–98	Syracuse Jr. Crunch	MetJHL	47	26	44	70	114	—	—	—	—	—
1998–99	Dubuque Fighting Saints	USHL	46	11	23	34	60	3	0	0	0	20
1999–00	Texas Tornado	NAHL	48	24	37	61	117	7	1	4	5	0
2000–01	Texas Tornado	NAHL	52	28	55	83	76	8	5	6	11	4
2001–02	Northeastern	Hockey East	39	9	26	35	40	—	—	—	—	—
2002–03	Northeastern	Hockey East	34	7	22	29	30	—	—	—	—	—
2003–04	Northeastern	Hockey East	34	16	19	35	16	—	—	—	—	—
2004–05	Northeastern	Hockey East	38	17	31	48	16	—	—	—	—	—
2004–05	Bridgeport Sound Tigers	AHL	11	1	5	6	4	—	—	—	—	—
2005–06	Ilves	SM-liiga	53	10	19	29	12	4	0	0	0	4
2006–07	Rockford IceHogs	UHL	2	0	2	2	0	—	—	—	—	—
2006–07	Milwaukee Admirals	AHL	73	14	24	38	37	4	1	0	1	2
2007–08	Milwaukee Admirals	AHL	64	9	28	37	48	5	0	0	0	6
2008–09	EHC Visp	NLB	16	2	13	15	16	—	—	—	—	—
2008–09	Alba Volán Székesfehérvár	EBEL	14	5	7	12	8	8	2	5	7	0
2009–10	Schwenninger Wild Wings	Bundesliga	50	16	35	51	52	13	1	13	14	6
2010–11	SønderjyskE Ishockey	AL-Bank Ligaen	38	11	35	46	22	10	3	3	6	4
NAHL totals			100	52	92	144	193	—	—	—	—	—
NCAA totals			145	49	98	147	102	—	—	—	—	—
AHL totals			148	24	57	81	89	—	—	—	—	—

== Awards and honors ==
Award	Year
All-Hockey East First Team	2004–05
AHCA East First-Team All-American	2004–05

Awards and achievements
Preceded by Steve Saviano	Len Ceglarski Sportsmanship Award; 2004–05	Succeeded by Danny O'Brien
