= 1994–95 NAHL season =

- League: North American Hockey League
- Sport: Ice hockey
- Games: 44
- Teams: 9

Regular season
- Season champions: Detroit Compuware Ambassadors

Robertson Cup Playoffs
- Finals champions: Detroit Compuware Ambassadors

NAHL seasons
- ← 1993–94 1995–96 →

The 1994–95 NAHL season was the 11th season of the North American Hockey League. The Detroit Compuware Ambassadors won the regular season championship and the Robertson Cup.

== Member changes ==
- The Niagara Scenic withdrew from the league, rebranded as the Buffalo Lightning, and joined the Empire Junior Hockey League.
- The Kalamazoo Jr. Wings relocated and became the Danville Wings.
- The Michigan Nationals rebranded as the Dearborn Heights Nationals.

== Regular season ==
The standings at the end of the regular season were as follows:

Note: x = clinched playoff berth; y = clinched regular season title

=== Standings ===
Team	GP	W	L	T	OTL	Pts	GF	GA
xy – Detroit Compuware Ambassadors	44	36	6	2	0	74	243	115
x – Springfield Jr. Blues	44	32	8	2	2	68	275	148
x – Detroit Freeze	44	31	12	1	0	63	268	181
x – Cleveland Jr. Barons	44	25	15	1	3	54	203	185
x – Saginaw Gears	44	20	19	4	1	45	162	199
x – Indianapolis Junior Ice	44	17	25	0	2	36	199	216
x – Danville Wings	44	13	28	1	1	29	152	229
x – Lakeland Jets	44	10	32	1	1	22	167	283
Dearborn Heights Nationals	44	5	32	5	2	17	121	235

== Robertson Cup playoffs ==
Results missing

Detroit Compuware Ambassadors won the Robertson Cup.
