= Capital Centre Pride =

- City: Dimondale, Michigan
- League: North American Hockey League
- Founded: 1991
- Folded: 2003
- Home arena: Summit at the Capital Centre
- Colors: Green and gold

Franchise history
- 1991–1995: Saginaw Gears
- 1995–1998: Gaylord Grizzlies
- 1998–2000: Grand Rapids Bearcats
- 2000: Grand Rapids Rockets
- 2000–2003: Capital Centre Pride

The Capital Centre Pride were a junior ice hockey team that played in the North American Hockey League. The team played out of the Summit at the Capital Centre in Dimondale, Michigan, a suburb of Lansing, Michigan.

== History ==
Shortly after the completion of the Summit at the Capital Centre in 1999, the new building began looking for a permanent tenant. In short order, the Grand Rapids Rockets, which had been taken over by the NAHL in the middle of the previous season, were relocated to Dimondale and became the Capital Centre Pride for the 2000–01 season. Former NHLer Kelly Miller was chosen as the franchise's new head coach and he led them for one season.

While their home arena wasn't particularly large, seating only 1,000, the Pride nonetheless had trouble filling the barn. The average crowds in their first season were just over half capacity and, while there was a sizable increase for year two, the team was only getting about 600 fans per game in 2002–03. After three seasons, the team folded and, more than 20 years later, remain dormant.

== Season-by-season records ==
| Season | GP | W | L | OTL | PTS | GF | GA | Finish | Postseason |
|---|---|---|---|---|---|---|---|---|---|
| 2000–01 | 56 | 21 | 30 | 5 | 47 | 185 | 216 | t-3rd of 5, East t-6th of 10, NAHL | Lost Div. Semifinal series, 1–2 (Soo Indians) |
| 2001–02 | 56 | 24 | 28 | 4 | 52 | 190 | 208 | 5th of 6, East; 7th of 11, NAHL | Did not qualify |
| 2002–03 | 56 | 26 | 25 | 5 | 57 | 178 | 209 | 4th of 6, East; 7th of 11, NAHL | Lost Div. Semifinal series, 0–2 (Pittsburgh Forge) |
