= 2000–01 NAHL season =

- League: North American Hockey League
- Sport: Ice hockey
- Duration: Regular season September 2000 – March 2001; Postseason; April 1 – April 27, 2001
- Games: 56
- Teams: 10

Regular season
- Season champions: Soo Indians
- Season MVP: Jason Guerriero (Texas Tornado)
- Top scorer: Jason Guerriero (Texas Tornado)

Robertson Cup Playoffs
- Finals champions: Texas Tornado
- Runners-up: Soo Indians

NAHL seasons
- ← 1999–2000 2001–02 →

The 2000–01 NAHL season was the 17th season of the North American Hockey League. The season ran from September 2000 to April 2001 with a 56-game schedule for each team. The Soo Indians won the regular season championship and went on to be defeated by the Texas Tornado 3 games to 1 for the Robertson Cup.

== Member changes ==
- The Rochester Jr. Americans withdrew from the NAHL and disbanded during the offseason.
- The Grand Rapids Rockets relocated and became the Capital Centre Pride.

== Regular season ==
The standings at the end of the regular season were as follows:

Note: x = clinched playoff berth; y = clinched division title; z = clinched regular season title

=== Standings ===
==== East Division ====
| Team | GP | W | L | OTL | Pts | GF | GA |
|---|---|---|---|---|---|---|---|
| xyz – Soo Indians | 56 | 42 | 11 | 3 | 89 | 253 | 136 |
| x – Detroit Compuware Ambassadors | 56 | 32 | 21 | 3 | 67 | 193 | 171 |
| x – Cleveland Jr. Barons | 56 | 21 | 30 | 5 | 47 | 180 | 223 |
| x – Capital Centre Pride | 56 | 21 | 30 | 5 | 47 | 185 | 216 |
| USNTDP | 56 | 18 | 35 | 3 | 39 | 161 | 235 |

==== West Division ====
| Team | GP | W | L | OTL | Pts | GF | GA |
|---|---|---|---|---|---|---|---|
| xy – Texas Tornado | 56 | 40 | 12 | 4 | 84 | 265 | 158 |
| x – Danville Wings | 56 | 37 | 15 | 4 | 78 | 219 | 144 |
| x – Chicago Freeze | 56 | 35 | 20 | 1 | 71 | 230 | 198 |
| x – Springfield Jr. Blues | 56 | 19 | 36 | 1 | 39 | 164 | 276 |
| St. Louis Sting | 56 | 15 | 36 | 5 | 35 | 170 | 263 |

Note: The Soo Indians were awarded two additional points by the league's board of governors.

=== Statistics ===
==== Scoring leaders ====
The following players led the league in regular season points at the completion of all regular season games.

| Player | Team | GP | G | A | Pts | PIM |
|---|---|---|---|---|---|---|
| Jason Guerriero | Texas Tornado | 52 | 28 | 55 | 83 | 76 |
| Rich Hansen | Texas Tornado | 55 | 30 | 47 | 77 | 18 |
| Barry Pochmara | Soo Indians | 54 | 25 | 50 | 75 | 52 |
| Tom Stone | Soo Indians | 55 | 47 | 27 | 74 | 32 |
| Greg Rallo | Springfield Jr. Blues | 53 | 43 | 25 | 68 | 78 |
| Todd Grant | Danville Wings | 47 | 37 | 31 | 68 | 81 |
| Peter Szabo | Danville Wings | 38 | 13 | 55 | 68 | 51 |
| Bo Cheesman | Soo Indians | 56 | 29 | 38 | 67 | 56 |
| Jim Slater | Texas Tornado | 48 | 27 | 37 | 64 | 122 |
| Jason Deitsch | Texas Tornado | 37 | 29 | 33 | 62 | 140 |

== Robertson Cup playoffs ==
Division Semifinals (Best-of-3)
E1 | Soo Indians | 2
E4 | Capital Centre Pride | 1
E2 | Detroit Compuware Ambassadors | 1
E3 | Cleveland Jr. Barons | 2
W1 | Texas Tornado | 2
W4 | Springfield Jr. Blues | 0
W2 | Danville Wings | 2
W3 | Chicago Freeze | 1

Division Final (Best-of-3)
E1 | Soo Indians | 2
E3 | Cleveland Jr. Barons | 1
W1 | Texas Tornado | 2
W2 | Danville Wings | 0

Championship (Best-of-5)
E1 | Soo Indians | 1
W1 | Texas Tornado | 3

Note: * denotes overtime period(s)
