= Pittsburgh Forge =

- City: Pittsburgh, Pennsylvania
- League: NAHL
- Conference: Eastern
- Founded: 2001
- Operated: 2001–2003
- Home arena: Island Sports Center
- Colors: Red, gold, black, white

Franchise history
- 2001–2003: Pittsburgh Forge
- 2003–2005: Toledo IceDiggers
- 2005–2010: Alpena IceDiggers
- 2010–present: Corpus Christi IceRays

Championships
- Regular season titles: 2003
- Division titles: 2003
- Robertson Cups: 2003

The Pittsburgh Forge are a defunct Junior A Tier II ice hockey team based in Pittsburgh, Pennsylvania, which played in the North American Hockey League (NAHL). The team was founded in 2001 by Kevin Constantine, a former coach of the NHL's Pittsburgh Penguins. They played at the Island Sports Center. The team compiled an 80-24-8 record in the first and only two seasons. The Forge were finalists in the Robertson Cup Tournament, the NAHL championship, during their inaugural season and were the first expansion team to do so. During their second season, the Forge set a national Junior A record with 43 wins and won the NAHL's regular season championship as well as the Robertson Cup Tournament. In two seasons, the Forge advanced 18 players onto scholarships with Division I college hockey programs. In 2003, the franchise was sold to investors in Toledo, Ohio and was relocated as the Toledo IceDiggers.

== Players ==
The final roster of the 2002–03 NAHL national champion Forge – the last Forge team – and their scholarship schools: Randy Bauer, Sean Berkstresser (Robert Morris), Tom Biondich (Robert Morris), Andy Brandt (Wisconsin), Jace Buzek (Robert Morris), Ben Camper (Colgate), Josh Coyle (Union), John Dingle (Ohio State), Joe Federoff (Alabama Huntsville), Josef Fotjik, Jim Gehring (Mercyhurst), Mike Handza (Denver), Denis Kirstien (Mercyhurst), Chris Lawrence (Michigan State), Mike Mannina, Peter Mannino (Denver), Matt McBride, Dylan Reese (Harvard), Gabe Rehak, Daniel Shildorfer, Erix Trax (Robert Morris), Brandon Warner (Michigan State), Ryan Webb, Matt Zeman,

== Season-by-season records ==
Season	GP	W	L	OTL	Pts	GF	GA	PIM	Finish	Playoffs
2001–02	56	37	13	4	78	199	147	1,135	2nd of 6, East; 3rd of 11, NAHL	Won Div. Semifinal series, 2–0 (Cleveland Jr. Barons); Won Robertson Cup Semifinal series, 2–1 (Texas Tornado); Lost Robertson Cup Championship series, 0–2 (Detroit Compuware Ambassadors)
2002–03	56	43	9	4	90	208	111	1,227	1st of 6, East; 1st of 11, NAHL	Won Div. Semifinal series, 2–0 (Capital Centre Pride); Won Robertson Cup Semifinal series, 2–0 (Danville Wings); Won Robertson Cup Championship series, 3–1 (Texas Tornado)
