= Detroit Compuware Ambassadors (NAHL) =

- City: Plymouth, Michigan
- League: NAHL
- Founded: 1984
- Folded: 2003
- Home arena: Compuware Arena
- Colors: Gold, brown, white

Franchise history
- 1984–2003: Detroit Compuware Ambassadors

Championships
- Regular season titles: 9: 1987, 1988, 1989, 1990, 1991, 1992, 1995, 1999, 2002
- Division titles: 7: 1989, 1990, 1991, 1992, 1999, 2000, 2002
- Robertson Cups: 11: 1986, 1987, 1988, 1989, 1990, 1992, 1994, 1994, 1998, 1999, 2002

The Detroit Compuware Ambassadors were a Junior A ice hockey team that played in the North American Hockey League. The team was originally based in Oak Park, Michigan, playing out of the Compuware Oak Park Arena but later played at the Compuware Arena in Plymouth, Michigan.

== History ==
As far back as the mid-1970's, Compuware cofounder Peter Karmanos Jr. had supported youth hockey, labeling his organization 'Ambassadors' for his company. Karmanos began expanding his footprint into the sport in the 1984 when he purchased the Windsor Spitfires, a junior team in the Ontario Hockey League. That same year, he founded a second junior team to take the place of the Detroit Jr. Wings, who had suspended play the year before. The new club was named the Detroit Compuware Ambassadors and played in the Detroit suburb of Oak Park, Michigan. The Ambassadors swiftly became the best junior team in the North American Hockey League, winning five consecutive championships from 1986 through 1990.

With the success of the Ambassadors, Karmanos attempted to relocate the Spitfires to the Detroit area but faced resistance from the OHL. After also failing to purchase and relocate the Sault Ste. Marie Greyhounds, he was allowed to sell the Spitfires and found an expansion franchise, which was also called the Detroit Compuware Ambassadors, in 1989. The two identically-named clubs played at separate facilities so there were no scheduling conflicts, however, the region was becoming crowded with junior teams since the Jr. Wings had also returned in 1987. The NAHL club continued as the top team in their league throughout the early 1990s and had some of the competitive pressure remove when the Jr. Wings folded and the affiliation with the Detroit Red Wings was transferred to the OHL Ambassadors in 1992. However, after Karmanos had failed to purchase the Detroit Red Wings in the mid-90s, he bought the Hartford Whalers in 1994. As a result, Detroit ended their affiliation with the Jr. Wings and forced the team to play the 1995–96 season in Oak Park.

The situation was hardly ideal for either club and Karmanos made plans to move both franchises to a new, larger arena. In just six months, the Compuware Arena was built in Plymouth, Michigan and both teams were able to begin the 1996–97 season in the new facility. That same year, USA Hockey founded its USA Hockey National Team Development Program (USNTDP), a nationally-focused club for the purpose of developing players under the age of 18 for professional hockey. The organization reached an agreement with Karmanos to use the Compuware Arena as their home venue, forcing the Ambassadors to share their home rink with two other clubs. The situation became somewhat awkward the following year when the USNTDP joined the NAHL, placing two league teams in same building. Predictably, with so many junior games available, attendance for Ambassador games suffered. Despite the club winning championships in '98 and '99, the team routinely drew less than 400 fans to a facility that could hold 3,500.

The poor attendance persisted for seven years with seemingly no end in sight. In 2003, Karmanos decided to pull the plug on the Ambassadors, dissolving the most successful franchise in NAHL history.

== Season-by-season records ==
| Season | GP | W | L | T | OTL | Pts | GF | GA | Finish | Playoffs |
|---|---|---|---|---|---|---|---|---|---|---|
| 1984–85 | 24 | 11 | 9 | 4 | - | 26 | 110 | 108 | 2nd of 3, NAJHL | Missing information |
| 1985–86 | 43 | 17 | 20 | 6 | - | 40 | 194 | 224 | 3rd of 4, NAJHL | Won Robertson Cup |
| 1986–87 | 37 | 23 | 8 | 6 | - | 52 | 214 | 122 | t-1st of 5, NAJHL | Won Robertson Cup |
| 1987–88 | 32 | 24 | 5 | 3 | - | 51 | 212 | 99 | 1st of 6, NAJHL | Won Robertson Cup |
| 1988–89 | 40 | 30 | 8 | 2 | - | 62 | 248 | 149 | 1st of 4, Eastern Div. 1st of 8, NAJHL | Won Robertson Cup |
| 1989–90 | 44 | 42 | 0 | 2 | - | 86 | 343 | 196 | 1st of 4, Eastern Div. 1st of 8, NAJHL | Won Robertson Cup |
| 1990–91 | 40 | 30 | 5 | 5 | - | 65 | - | - | 1st of 4, Eastern Div. 1st of 8, NAJHL | Missing information |
| 1991–92 | 40 | 29 | 8 | 3 | 2 | 63 | 229 | 122 | 1st of 4, Eastern Div. 1st of 8, NAJHL | Won Robertson Cup |
| 1992–93 | 40 | 10 | 22 | 6 | 2 | 26 | 140 | 194 | 4th of 4, Eastern Div. 7th of 8, NAHL | Missing information |
| 1993–94 | 46 | 27 | 12 | 5 | 2 | 59 | 193 | 223 | 2nd of 5, Eastern Div. 2nd of 10, NAHL | Won Robertson Cup |
| 1994–95 | 44 | 36 | 6 | 2 | 0 | 74 | 243 | 115 | 1st of 9, NAHL | Won Robertson Cup |
| 1995–96 | 46 | 29 | 12 | 5 | 0 | 63 | 191 | 153 | 2nd of 8, NAHL | Won Quarterfinal series, 2–0 (Danville Wings); Won Semifinal series, 2–0 (Detroit Freeze); Lost Robertson Cup series, 1–2 (Springfield Jr. Blues) |
| 1996–97 | 46 | 33 | 10 | - | 3 | 69 | 217 | 148 | 2nd of 8, NAHL | Won Quarterfinal series, 2–0 (Cleveland Jr. Barons); Won Semifinal series, 2–0 (Soo Indians); Lost Robertson Cup series, 1–2 (Springfield Jr. Blues) |
| 1997–98 | 56 | 39 | 16 | - | 1 | 79 | 219 | 151 | 2nd of 9, NAHL | Won Quarterfinal series, 2–1 (St. Louis Sting); Won Semifinal series, 2–0 (Danville Wings); Won Robertson Cup series, 2–0 (USNTDP) |
| 1998–99 | 56 | 39 | 11 | - | 6 | 84 | 214 | 147 | 1st of 5, North Div. 1st of 9, NAHL | Won Div. Semifinal series, 2–0 (Cleveland Jr. Barons); Won Robertson Cup Semifinal series, 2–0 (Danville Wings); Won Robertson Cup Championship series, 3–0 (St. Louis Sting) |
| 1999–2000 | 56 | 38 | 15 | - | 3 | 79 | 211 | 143 | 1st of 6, East Div. t-2nd of 11, NAHL | Won Div. Semifinal series, 2–1 (USNTDP); Lost Robertson Cup Semifinal series, 2–0 (Danville Wings) |
| 2000–01 | 56 | 32 | 21 | - | 3 | 67 | 193 | 171 | 2nd of 5, East Div. 5th of 10, NAHL | Lost Div. Semifinal series, 1–2 (Cleveland Jr. Barons) |
| 2001–02 | 56 | 42 | 9 | - | 5 | 89 | 233 | 138 | 1st of 6, East Div. 1st of 11, NAHL | Won Div. Semifinal series, 2–0 (Soo Indians); Won Robertson Cup Semifinal series, 2–0 (Springfield Spirit); Won Robertson Cup Championship series, 2–0 (Pittsburgh Forge) |
| 2002–03 | 56 | 41 | 12 | - | 3 | 85 | 210 | 143 | 2nd of 5, East Div. 2nd of 11, NAHL | Won Div. Semifinal series, 2–0 (Soo Indians); Lost Robertson Cup Semifinal series, 1–2 (Texas Tornado) |
