= Chicago Freeze =

- City: Geneva, Illinois
- League: North American Hockey League
- Division: West
- Founded: 1992
- Folded: 2003
- Home arena: Fox Valley Ice Arena
- Colors: Navy Blue, White, and Black

Franchise history
- 1992–1997: Detroit Freeze
- 1997–2003: Chicago Freeze

The Chicago Freeze was a Tier II junior A ice hockey team in the North American Hockey League's West Division. The team was originally the Detroit Freeze until it relocated to a Chicago suburb of Geneva. The Chicago Freeze played out of the Fox Valley Ice Arena, which later became home to the Chicago Hitmen of the NAHL.

== Regular season ==
Statistics source:

Season	Games	Won	Lost	OTL	SOL	Points	GF	GA	Attendance	Finish	Playoffs
1997–98	56	28	24	—	4	60	202	208	2,468	5th of 9, NAHL	Lost Quarterfinal series, 1–2 (Danville Wings)
1998–99	56	28	23	—	4	60	189	178	1,751	3rd of 4, South; 5th of 9, NAHL	Lost Div. Semifinal series, 1–2 (Springfield Jr. Blues)
1999–2000	56	26	35	—	4	56	171	194	1,616	4th of 5, West; 7th of 11, NAHL	Lost Div. Semifinal series, 0–2 (Texas Tornado)
2000–01	56	35	33	1	3	71	230	198	1,318	3rd of 5, West; 4th of 10, NAHL	Lost Div. Semifinal series, 1–2 (Danville Wings)
2001–02	56	16	33	4	3	36	153	231	1,362	4th of 5, West; 10th of 11, NAHL	Lost Div. Semifinal series, 1–2 (Texas Tornado)
2002–03	56	24	34	3	5	70	220	180	1,700	2nd of 5, West; 4th of 11, NAHL	Lost Div. Semifinal series, 1–2 (Danville Wings)

== Notable alumni ==
- Craig Anderson, goaltender: 1998–99 season
- Jason Bacashihua, goaltender: - 1999–2000 and 2000–01 seasons
- Chris Conner, right wing: 2000–01 and 2001–02 seasons
- George Parros, right wing: 1998–99 season
- John Scott, defenseman: 2001–02 season
