= Cleveland Jr. Barons =

Ice hockey team in Parma, Ohio, US

- City: Parma, Ohio
- League: North American Hockey League
- Founded: 1990
- Folded: 2008
- Home arena: Barons Ice Arena
- Colors: Red, black and gold

Franchise history
- 1990–2006: Cleveland Jr. Barons
- 2006–2008: Ohio Junior Blue Jackets

The Cleveland Jr. Barons were a junior ice hockey team that played in the North American Hockey League and played out of Parma, Ohio. They were a branch of the Cleveland Barons Hockey Association. Their top accomplishment was winning the 2006 North Division playoff title, allowing them to advance to Robertson Cup tournament. However, after the 2005–2006 season, the team moved to Columbus, Ohio and transferred to the United States Hockey League, playing as the Ohio Junior Blue Jackets.

== Season-by-season records ==
Season	GP	W	L	T	OTL	SOL	PTS	GF	GA	Finish	Postseason
Northeastern Jr. Hockey League
1990–90	Missing information										
1991–92	Missing information										
1992–93	Missing information										
North American Hockey League
1993–94	46	23	16	5	2	–	51	205	183	3rd of 5, Eastern; 5th of 10, NAHL	Information missing
1994–95	44	25	15	1	3	–	54	203	185	4th of 9, NAHL	Information missing
1995–96	46	22	19	3	2	–	49	218	192	5th of 8, NAHL	Lost Quarterfinal series, 0–2 (Soo Indians)
1996–97	46	17	27	–	2	–	36	171	224	t-6th of 8, NAHL	Lost Quarterfinal series, 0–2 (Detroit Compuware Ambassadors)
1997–98	56	15	38	–	3	–	33	160	269	9th of 9, NAHL	Did not qualify
1998–99	56	21	31	–	4	–	46	182	232	4th of 5, North; 7th of 9, NAHL	Lost Quarterfinal series, 0–2 (Detroit Compuware Ambassadors)
1999–2000	56	34	19	–	3	–	71	210	194	3rd of 6, East; 5th of 11, NAHL	Lost Div. Semifinal series, 1–2 (Soo Indians)
2000–01	56	21	30	–	5	–	47	185	216	t-3rd of 5, East t-6th of 10, NAHL	Won Div. Semifinal series, 2–1 (Detroit Compuware Ambassadors); Lost Div. Final series, 1–2 (Soo Indians)
2001–02	56	35	18	–	3	–	73	223	196	3rd of 6, East; 4th of 11, NAHL	Lost Div. Semifinal series, 0–2 (Pittsburgh Forge)
2002–03	56	12	38	–	6	–	30	150	253	6th of 6, East; 11th of 11, NAHL	Did not qualify
2003–04	56	34	18	–	4	–	72	194	143	3rd of 7, North; 7th of 21, NAHL	Lost Div. Semifinal series, 2–3 (Springfield Jr. Blues)
2004–05	56	27	26	–	3	–	57	207	200	5th of 6, North; 15th of 19, NAHL	Did not qualify
2005–06	56	35	19	–	4	–	74	197	150	2nd of 5, North; 6th of 20, NAHL	Won Div. Semifinal series, 3–2 (Mahoning Valley Phantoms); Won Div. Final series, 4–3 (USNTDP); Lost Round-Robin Semifinal, 3–5 (Texas Tornado), 1–2 (Bozeman IceDogs)

== NHL alumni ==
- John Albert: Winnipeg Jets
- Carter Camper: Boston Bruins
- Sean Collins: Washington Capitals
- Dan Fritsche: Columbus Blue Jackets
- Peter Harrold: Los Angeles Kings
- Mike Rupp: New Jersey Devils, Phoenix Coyotes, Columbus Blue Jackets, Pittsburgh Penguins, New York Rangers, and Minnesota Wild (Scored game winning goal of 2003 Stanley Cup Finals)
- Ben Simon: Atlanta Thrashers and Columbus Blue Jackets
- Jim Slater: Atlanta Thrashers and Winnipeg Jets
- Bill Thomas, Phoenix Coyotes, Pittsburgh Penguins, and Florida Panthers

== Youth organization ==
The Cleveland Barons Hockey Association still sponsors a number of youth hockey teams named the Cleveland Barons, including U16 and U18 teams.
