= Keystone Ice Miners =

- City: Connellsville, Pennsylvania
- League: North American Hockey League (NAHL)
- Division: North
- Founded: 2010
- Folded: 2015
- Home arena: The Ice Mine
- Colors: Blue, orange, and light blue
- Owners: Hat Trick Hockey, LLC
- General manager: Michael Gershon
- Head coach: Michael Gershon

Franchise history
- 2010–2014: Port Huron Fighting Falcons
- 2014–2015: Keystone Ice Miners

The Keystone Ice Miners were a Junior A Tier II ice hockey team based at The Ice Mine arena in Connellsville, Pennsylvania. The team moved to Connellsville in May 2014; prior to the move, the team was known as the Port Huron Fighting Falcons.

== History ==
The team began play during the 2010-11 season as the Port Huron Fighting Falcons are a Junior A Tier II ice hockey team based out of Port Huron, Michigan. A member of the North American Hockey League's North Division, the team plays their home games in the McMorran Arena. On July 10, 2010 the team announced its name as the Fighting Falcons. Despite losing their first 15 games, they won 4-1 against the Springfield Jr. Blues on November 7 landing the team's first victory in history.

In 2014, the team announced it would be moving to Connellsville, Pennsylvania, a city south of Pittsburgh. The team will play at the Ice Mine and change their team name to the Ice Miners. Hat Trick Hockey, the parent ownership of the Ice Miners, announced in mid-December 2014 that they were terminating its membership with the NAHL effective immediately. The league has indicated it plans to keep the team operational through the remainder of the 2014-15 season, including playoffs, if the Ice Miners should qualify.

== Season records ==
Season	GP	W	L	OTL	PTS	GF	GA	PIM	Finish	Playoffs
Port Huron Fighting Falcons
2010–11	58	6	46	6	18	127	312	1,408	8th, North	did not qualify
2011–12	60	38	19	3	79	203	159	1,010	1st, North	lost in Round Robin
2012–13	60	32	24	4	68	178	163	1,004	4th, North	lost in 2nd round
2013–14	60	35	15	10	80	187	151	828	1st, North	lost in 3rd round
Keystone Ice Miners
2014–15	60	31	24	5	67	153	140	836	2nd, North	Lost First Round Series, 0-3, Soo Eagles

== Uniforms and logos ==
The team's colors are light blue, black and yellow. Home jerseys will feature the main Fighting Falcons logo with an alternate Falcon Head logo appearing on the road jerseys. Shoulder patches on both home and away uniforms will feature a circular logo with the Blue Water Bridge, that spans the St. Clair River separating Port Huron, Michigan and Sarnia, Ontario, Canada.

The Fighting Falcons first logo was released on July 10, 2010. It bore a strong resemblance to a logo created by Mike Ivall of Ivall Design.

On July 15, 2010, the Fighting Falcons announced the team will create new logo to avoid any problems relating to any similarities with Ivall's concept art after he had contacted the team and noted similarities.
