= Alaska Avalanche =

- City: Palmer, Alaska
- League: North American Hockey League
- Division: West
- Founded: 1990
- Home arena: MTA Events Center
- Colors: Green, Blue, and white

Franchise history
- 1990–1991: Dearborn Magic
- 1991–1994: Michigan Nationals
- 1994–1996: Dearborn Heights Nationals
- 1996–2001: St. Louis Sting
- 2001–2005: Springfield Spirit
- 2005–2006: Wasilla Spirit
- 2006–2012: Alaska Avalanche
- 2012–present: Johnstown Tomahawks

The Alaska Avalanche were a Tier II junior ice hockey team in the North American Hockey League's West Division. The team played its home games first at the Curtis D. Menard Memorial Sports Center in Wasilla, Alaska and then at the MTA Events Center in Palmer, Alaska.

== History ==
In 2005, the Springfield Spirit moved to Wasilla, Alaska, as the 'Wasilla Spirit', only to re-brand themselves as the 'Alaska Avalanche' the next season. The Avalanche played out of the Curtis D. Menard Memorial Sports Center in Wasilla until the end of the 2009–10 season. The Avalanche moved to Palmer, Alaska, beginning in the 2010–11 season and played at the MTA Events Center.

The team relocated to Johnstown, Pennsylvania, in 2012, taking the place of the ECHL's Johnstown Chiefs, who moved to Greenville, South Carolina, in 2011. They became known as the Johnstown Tomahawks.

== Season-by-season records ==
Season	GP	W	L	OTL	PTS	GF	GA	PIM	Finish	Playoffs
Wasilla Spirit
2005–06	56	23	33	2	48	133	187	1,307	t-3rd of 5, West t-15th of 20, NAHL	Lost Div. Semifinal series, 2–3 (Fairbanks Ice Dogs)
Alaska Avalanche
2006–07	62	16	39	7	39	148	242	1,699	6th of 6, South; 17th of 17, NAHL	Did not qualify
2007–08	58	16	38	4	36	158	270	1,251	5th of 6, South; 17th of 18, NAHL	Did not qualify
2008–09	58	23	30	5	51	172	224	1,505	3rd of 4, West; 16th of 19, NAHL	Lost Div. Semifinal series, 1–3 (Wenatchee Wild)
2009–10	58	32	19	7	71	198	178	1,393	2nd of 4, West t-5th of 19, NAHL	Lost Div. Semifinal series, 0–3 (Fairbanks Ice Dogs)
2010–11	58	32	22	4	68	193	173	1,479	3rd of 6, West; 13th of 26, NAHL	Lost Div. Semifinal series, 0–3 (Wenatchee Wild)
2011–12	60	35	19	6	76	192	173	1,161	3rd of 6, West; 13th of 28, NAHL	Lost Div. Semifinal series, 2–3 (Wenatchee Wild)
