= Nelson Center =

Recreation and sports venue in Springfield, Illinois

Coordinates: 39°49′40.0″N 89°39′4.3″W

- Interactive map of Nelson Center
- Location: 1601 North 5th Street; Springfield, IL 62702
- Owner: Springfield Park District
- Operator: Springfield Park District
- Capacity: 2,100 (hockey)
- Surface: 200' x 85'(hockey)
- Public transit: SMTD

Tenant
- Springfield Jr. Blues (NAHL)

The Franklin P. Nelson Recreation Center ("Nelson Center") is a 2,100-seat multi purpose ice arena and recreational facility located in Springfield, Illinois. The ice arena has two NHL regulation-sized ice sheets.

It is the home to the Springfield Jr. Blues of the North American Hockey League and former home of the Robert Morris–Springfield Eagles men's ice hockey team competing at the ACHA Division III level in the Mid-American Collegiate Hockey Association. The Nelson center is also home to several local high school ice hockey teams, and is used by local figure skating clubs, youth, and adult recreational ice hockey leagues, as well as public skating.

The Nelson Center was opened with one ice rink in the early 1970s. The second rink was opened in 2002.

On May 30, 1976, the rock band Rush played the Nelson Center, a stop on the band's 2112 concert tour.
