= 1999–2000 NAHL season =

- League: North American Hockey League
- Sport: Ice hockey
- Duration: Regular season September 1999 – March 2000; Postseason; April 6 – April 28, 2000
- Games: 56
- Teams: 11

Regular season
- Season champions: Texas Tornado
- Season MVP: Ron Vogel (Texas Tornado)
- Top scorer: Colin Shields (Cleveland Jr. Barons)

Robertson Cup Playoffs
- Finals champions: Danville Wings
- Runners-up: Texas Tornado

NAHL seasons
- ← 1998–99 2000–01 →

The 1999–2000 NAHL season was the 16th season of the North American Hockey League. The season ran from September 1999 to April 2000 with a 56-game schedule for each team. The Texas Tornado won the regular season championship and went on be defeated by the Danville Wings 3 games to 0 for the Robertson Cup.

== Member changes ==
- The Texas Tornado and Rochester Jr. Americans joined the NAHL as expansion franchises.
- During the season, the league assumed control of the Grand Rapids Bearcats. After this, the team was renamed the Grand Rapids Rockets for the rest of the year.

== Regular season ==
The standings at the end of the regular season were as follows:

Note: x = clinched playoff berth; y = clinched division title; z = clinched regular season title

=== Standings ===
==== East Division ====
Team	GP	W	L	OTL	Pts	GF	GA
xy – Detroit Compuware Ambassadors	56	38	15	3	79	211	143
x – Soo Indians	56	35	15	6	76	187	142
x – Cleveland Jr. Barons	56	34	19	3	71	210	194
x – USNTDP	56	21	29	6	48	158	195
Grand Rapids Bearcats/Rockets	56	18	35	3	39	148	196
Rochester Jr. Americans	56	12	41	3	27	166	260

==== West Division ====
Team	GP	W	L	OTL	Pts	GF	GA
xyz – Texas Tornado	56	42	12	2	86	239	133
x – Danville Wings	56	36	13	7	79	201	175
x – Springfield Jr. Blues	56	28	24	4	60	190	183
x – Chicago Freeze	56	26	26	4	56	171	194
St. Louis Sting	56	18	35	3	39	164	230

=== Statistics ===
==== Scoring leaders ====
The following players led the league in regular season points at the completion of all regular season games.

Player	Team	GP	G	A	Pts	PIM
Colin Shields	Cleveland Jr. Barons	55	46	49	95	40
Jim Slater	Cleveland Jr. Barons	56	35	50	85	129
Craig Bushey	Cleveland Jr. Barons	54	34	42	76	170
Jason Deitsch	Texas Tornado	55	29	40	69	120
Don Patrick	Rochester Jr. Americans	53	27	37	64	31
Jason Guerriero	Texas Tornado	48	24	37	61	117
Eric Ortlip	St. Louis Sting	51	28	30	58	45
Eric Przepiorka	Chicago Freeze	55	28	28	56	89
Adam Nightingale	Soo Indians	52	20	36	56	63
Chris Lieckfield	Texas Tornado	50	19	36	55	110

== Robertson Cup playoffs ==
Division Semifinals (Best-of-3)
E1	Detroit Compuware Ambassadors	3*	1	4*
E4	USNTDP	2	2	3
W2	Danville Wings	5	6	-
W3	Springfield Jr. Blues	4	2	-
W1	Texas Tornado	9	5	-
W4	Chicago Freeze	1	1	-
E2	Soo Indians	1	6	5
E3	Cleveland Jr. Barons	6	4	3

Semifinal (Best-of-3)
E1	Detroit Compuware Ambassadors	2	2	-
W2	Danville Wings	3	3*	-
W1	Texas Tornado	5	6	-
E2	Soo Indians	3	2	-

Championship (Best-of-5)
E2	Danville Wings	7	4	3	-	-
W1	Texas Tornado	4	2	1	-	-

Note: * denotes overtime period(s)
