= Gaylord Grizzlies =

- City: Gaylord, Michigan
- League: North American Hockey League
- Founded: 1991
- Folded: 2003
- Home arena: Otsego County Sportsplex
- Colors: Blue, black and brown
- Head coach: Brent Jarrett

Franchise history
- 1991–1995: Saginaw Gears
- 1995–1998: Gaylord Grizzlies
- 1998–2000: Grand Rapids Bearcats
- 2000: Grand Rapids Rockets
- 2000–2003: Capital Centre Pride

The Gaylord Grizzlies were a junior ice hockey team that played in the North American Hockey League. The team played out of the Otsego County Sportsplex in Gaylord, Michigan.

== History ==
In the middle of their 5th season, the Saginaw Gears were sold and relocated to Gaylord, Michigan, immediately assuming a new identity as the Gaylord Grizzlies. For the team's first full season in their new home, the club brought in Marty Howe, the son of the legendary Gordie Howe, as the Grizzlies head coach. Positive results were infrequent so the club then turned to Brent Jarrett for the following season. The club fell even further in the standings and had average crowds of less than 550 for the season. The team was then sold once more and relocated to Grand Rapids, Michigan.

== Season-by-season records ==
Season	GP	W	L	T	OTL	PTS	GF	GA	Finish	Postseason
1995–96*	46	20	19	4	3	47	167	170	6th of 8, NAHL	Lost Quarterfinal series, 0–2 (Detroit Freeze)
1996–97	46	16	26	–	4	36	165	206	t-6th of 8, NAHL	Lost Quarterfinal series, 0–2 (Soo Indians)
1997–98	56	14	36	–	6	34	159	228	8th of 9, NAHL	Lost Quarterfinal series, 0–2 (Springfield Jr. Blues)

* The team relocated to Gaylord in December of 1995
