= Danville Wings =

Danville Iron
- City: Danville, Illinois
- League: USHL
- Division: Premier
- Founded: 1988
- Operated: 2026-current
- Folded: 2014
- Colors: Red, Orange, Yellow, and black
- Owner: Bo Cheesman
- General manager: Bo Cheesman
- Head coach: Bo Cheesman

Franchise history
- 1988–1989: Western Michigan Wolves
- 1989–1994: Kalamazoo Jr. Wings
- 1994–2003: Danville Wings (NAHL)
- 2003–2004: Danville Wings (USHL)
- 2004–2014: Indiana Ice
- 2026–present: Danville Iron

Championships
- Robertson Cups: 1: 2000

The Danville Iron are a Tier III ice hockey team that plays in the United States Hockey League as a 2026–27 season expansion franchise. The Iron will play their home games at the David S. Palmer Arena in Danville, Illinois.

== History ==
The Western Michigan Wolves first started play in Kalamazoo in the 1988–89 NAHL season. The team rebranded themselves as the Kalamazoo Jr. Wings that next season. The Jr. Wings won the Robertson Cup in the 1990–91 and 1992–93 seasons. The franchise was purchased by rock promoter Jay Goldberg and then relocated to Danville, Illinois after the 1993–94 season.

The Danville Wings were a Tier I ice hockey team that played the North American Hockey League from 1994 until 2003 when they moved to the United States Hockey League for the 2003–04 season. After that season, the team was relocated to Indianapolis, Indiana and renamed the Indiana Ice. The Wings played their home games at the David S. Palmer Arena in Danville, Illinois.

The Danville Wings would play in the NAHL for nine seasons, winning the Robertson Cup in 2000. After the 2002–03 season, the Wings would move to the United States Hockey League. They only played for one season there before the team was bought as a replacement for the Indianapolis Ice of the pro Central Hockey League, who were moved to Topeka, Kansas after the 2003–04 season.

== Season records ==
Season	GP	W	L	T	OTL	PTS	GF	GA	PIM	Finish	Playoffs
Danville Wings (NAHL)
1994–95	43	13	28	1	1	28	152	229	N/A	7th of 9, NAHL	Information missing
1995–96	46	14	29	2	1	31	158	220	N/A	7th of 8, NAHL	Lost Quarterfinal series, 0–2 (Detroit Compuware Ambassadors)
1996–97	46	26	16	–	1	56	221	165	N/A	4th of 8, NAHL	Won Quarterfinal series, 2–1 (Detroit Freeze); Lost Semifinal series, 0–2 (Springfield Jr. Blues)
1997–98	56	31	20	–	5	67	233	218	N/A	4th of 9, NAHL	Won Quarterfinal series, 2–1 (Chicago Freeze); Lost Semifinal series, 0–2 (Detroit Compuware Ambassadors)
1998–99	56	17	34	–	5	39	163	217	1,112	4th of 4, South; 8th of 9, NAHL	Lost Div. Semifinal series, 1–2 (St. Louis Sting)
1999–2000	56	36	13	–	7	79	201	175	1,744	2nd of 5, West t-2nd of 11, NAHL	Won Div. Semifinal series, 2–0 (Springfield Jr. Blues); Won Semifinal series, 2–0 (Detroit Compuware Ambassadors); Won Robertson Cup Championship series, 3–0 (Texas Tornado)
2000–01	56	37	15	–	4	78	219	144	1,603	2nd of 5, South; 3rd of 10, NAHL	Won Div. Semifinal series, 2–1 (Chicago Freeze); Lost Div. Final series, 0–2 (Texas Tornado)
2001–02	56	26	22	–	8	60	168	162	1,274	2nd of 5, West; 6th of 11, NAHL	Lost Div. Semifinal series, 0–2 (Springfield Spirit)
2002–03	56	30	19	–	7	67	198	157	1,532	3rd of 5, West; 5th of 11, NAHL	Won Div. Semifinal series, 0–2 (Chicago Freeze); Lost Semifinal series, 0–2 (Pittsburgh Forge)
Danville Wings (USHL)
2003–04	60	29	23	–	8	66	171	178	1,309	3rd of 6, East; 6th of 12, USHL	Won Div. Semifinal series, 3–1 (Cedar Rapids RoughRiders); Lost Div. Final series, 0–3 (Waterloo Black Hawks)
2004: team became Indiana Ice
