= Grand Rapids Bearcats =

- City: Grand Rapids, Michigan
- League: North American Hockey League
- Founded: 1991
- Folded: 2003
- Home arena: DeltaPlex Arena
- Colors: Purple, tan and white
- Head coach: Tom RudRud

Franchise history
- 1991–1995: Saginaw Gears
- 1995–1998: Gaylord Grizzlies
- 1998–2000: Grand Rapids Bearcats
- 2000: Grand Rapids Rockets
- 2000–2003: Capital Centre Pride

The Grand Rapids Bearcats were a junior ice hockey team that played in the North American Hockey League. The team played out of the DeltaPlex Arena in Grand Rapids, Michigan.

== History ==
In 1998, the Gaylord Grizzlies relocated to Grand Rapids and became the Grand Rapids Bearcats and hired Tom Rudrud as the team's head coach. After a moderately successful first season, the franchise experienced a crisis in year two. With attendance being nearly cut in half, the team's ownership could no longer cover operating costs and were forced to surrender the team to the NAHL. After the league took control, the club was rebranded as the 'Grand Rapids Rockets' for the remainder of the season. That summer, the Rockets were transferred to a new owner and relocated to Dimondale, Michigan.

== Season-by-season records ==
Season	GP	W	L	OTL	PTS	GF	GA	Finish	Postseason
1998–99	56	27	29	0	54	175	197	3rd of 5, North; 6th of 9, NAHL	Lost Quarterfinal series, 0–2 (Soo Indians)
1999–2000	56	18	35	3	39	148	196	5th of 6, East t-9th of 11, NAHL	Did not qualify
