= Johnstown Tomahawks =

- City: Johnstown, Pennsylvania
- League: North American Hockey League
- Division: East
- Founded: 1990
- Home arena: 1st Summit Bank Arena
- Colors: Navy, red, and white
- Owners: Tomahawks Hockey Partners LLC. (John Koufis - majority owner)
- Head coach: Adam Houli
- Media: The Tribune-Democrat, HockeyTV

Franchise history
- 1990–1991: Dearborn Magic
- 1991–1994: Michigan Nationals
- 1994–1996: Dearborn Heights Nationals
- 1996–2001: St. Louis Sting
- 2001–2005: Springfield Spirit
- 2005–2006: Wasilla Spirit
- 2006–2012: Alaska Avalanche
- 2012–present: Johnstown Tomahawks

Championships
- Regular season titles: 1 (2019)
- Division titles: 2 (2019, 2021)

The Johnstown Tomahawks are a Tier II junior ice hockey team in the North American Hockey League's East Division. The team plays its home games at the 1st Summit Bank Arena at Cambria County War Memorial in Johnstown, Pennsylvania. It is the oldest extant franchise in the NAHL.

== History ==
In 2012, the Alaska Avalanche relocated to Johnstown, Pennsylvania, taking the place of the ECHL's Johnstown Chiefs, who moved to Greenville, South Carolina the year before. They became known as the 'Johnstown Tomahawks'.

The Tomahawks played their first game on September 8, 2012, against the Port Huron Fighting Falcons and lost 4–3 in overtime. They won their first game in a 6–5 shootout on September 13, 2012, over the Kenai River Brown Bears. Their first home game at the Cambria County War Memorial Arena was played on September 29, 2012, losing 3–2 in a shootout to the Michigan Warriors.

The 2018–19 season was the most successful for the Tomahawks so far, as they were regular season champions of the North American Hockey League, along with East Division regular season and playoff champions. The Tomahawks advanced to the Robertson Cup Semifinals, where they lost to the Fairbanks Ice Dogs two games to one. The 2018–19 team set franchise records for wins, points, and points scored.

== Season-by-season records ==
Note: as of conclusion of 2024–25 season

Season	GP	W	L	OTL	PTS	GF	GA	PIM	Finish	Playoffs
2012–13	60	27	21	12	66	179	171	1343	5th of 8, North; 13th of 24, NAHL	Lost Div. Play-in series, 1–2 (Port Huron Fighting Falcons)
2013–14	60	28	27	5	61	167	181	1130	4th of 6, North; 16th of 24, NAHL	Lost Div. Semifinal series, 0–3 (Port Huron Fighting Falcons)
2014–15	60	25	27	8	58	166	191	1167	5th of 6, North; 17th of 24, NAHL	Did not qualify
2015–16	60	31	24	5	67	197	200	1502	3rd of 4, East; 20th of 22, NAHL	Won Div. Semifinal series, 3–0 (New Jersey Titans); Lost Div. Final series, 0–3 (Aston Rebels)
2016–17	60	40	16	4	84	209	148	1502	2nd of 5, East; 4th of 24, NAHL	Lost Div. Semifinal series, 0–3 (New Jersey Titans)
2017–18	60	23	33	4	50	142	195	1136	5th of 5, East; 20th of 23, NAHL	Did not qualify
2018–19	60	47	9	4	98	245	150	1029	1st of 6, East; 1st of 24, NAHL	Won Div. Semifinal series, 3–2 (Northeast Generals); Won Div. Final series, 3–2 (New Jersey Titans); Lost Robertson Cup Semifinal series, 1–2 (Fairbanks Ice Dogs)
2019–20	51	34	13	4	72	185	140	755	2nd of 7, East; 6th of 26, NAHL	Postseason cancelled
2020–21	54	39	10	5	83	220	144	876	1st of 6, East; 2nd of 23, NAHL	Lost Div. Semifinal series, 2–3 (Maryland Black Bears)
2021–22	60	34	20	6	74	225	148	797	2nd of 6, East; 9th of 29, NAHL	Lost Div. Semifinal series, 2–3 (Jamestown Rebels)
2022–23	60	29	26	5	63	189	211	1312	5th of 7, East; 21st of 29, NAHL	Did not qualify
2023–24	60	36	21	3	75	208	178	792	4th of 9, East; 11th of 32, NAHL	Lost Div. Play-in series, 0–2 (New Jersey Titans)
2024–25	59	31	23	2	67	183	188	617	5th of 10, East; 17th of 35, NAHL	Won Div. Play-in series, 2–0 (New Jersey Titans); Lost Div. Semifinal series, 2–3 Rochester Jr. Americans
2025-26	59	24	26	9	57	178	210	1226	7th of 9, East; 24th of 34, NAHL	Did not qualify
