= Dearborn Heights Nationals =

- City: Dearborn Heights, Michigan
- League: North American Hockey League
- Founded: 1990
- Home arena: Canfield Ice Arena
- Colors: Green, blue and white

Franchise history
- 1990–1991: Dearborn Magic
- 1991–1994: Michigan Nationals
- 1994–1996: Dearborn Heights Nationals
- 1996–2001: St. Louis Sting
- 2001–2005: Springfield Spirit
- 2005–2006: Wasilla Spirit
- 2006–2012: Alaska Avalanche
- 2012–present: Johnstown Tomahawks

The Dearborn Heights Nationals were a Tier II junior ice hockey team in the North American Hockey League. The team played its home games at the Canfield Ice Arena in Dearborn Heights, Michigan.

== History ==
In 1990 the NAHL added the Dearborn Magic as an expansion franchise in Dearborn, Michigan. After a year, the team relocated to Dearborn Heights, Michigan and became the Michigan Nationals. Three years on, the franchise rebranded as the Dearborn Heights Nationals. In 1996, the club was sold and moved to the St. Louis region, becoming the St. Louis Sting.

== Season-by-season records ==
Season	GP	W	L	T	OTL	PTS	GF	GA	Finish	Playoffs
Dearborn Magic
1990–91	40	6	31	3	—	15	—	—	4th of 4, Western; 7th of 8, NAHL	Missing information
Michigan Nationals
1991–92	40	11	24	5	2	29	149	202	4th of 4, Western; 7th of 8, NAHL	Missing information
1992–93	40	15	19	5	1	35	178	216	3rd of 4, Western; 5th of 8, NAHL	Missing information
1993–94	46	18	22	4	2	40	155	189	3rd of 5, Western; 7th of 10, NAHL	Missing information
Dearborn Heights Nationals
1994–95	44	5	32	5	2	17	121	235	9th of 9, NAHL	Missing information
1995–96	46	4	36	2	4	14	133	283	8th of 8, NAHL	Lost Div. Semifinal series, 0–2 (Springfield Jr. Blues)
