= Saginaw Gears (NAHL) =

- City: Saginaw, Michigan
- League: North American Hockey League
- Founded: 1991
- Folded: 2003
- Home arena: Saginaw Bay Ice Arena
- Colors: Blue, black and brown

Franchise history
- 1991–1995: Saginaw Gears
- 1995–1998: Gaylord Grizzlies
- 1998–2000: Grand Rapids Bearcats
- 2000: Grand Rapids Rockets
- 2000–2003: Capital Centre Pride

The Saginaw Gears were a junior ice hockey team that played in the North American Hockey League. The team played out of the Saginaw Bay Ice Arena in Saginaw, Michigan.

== History ==
In 1991, the NAHL approved adding an expansion team from Saginaw. The club took the same name as the former IHL team though they use a different color scheme and logo. The team was largely unsuccessful for their first three years, however, the club was finally able to finish with a winning record in 1995 under Dave Westner, who had played for the original Gears. In December of that year, the team was in the middle of their second winning campaign when they were abruptly moved to Gaylord, Michigan and became the Gaylord Grizzlies.

== Season-by-season records ==
Season	GP	W	L	T	OTL	PTS	GF	GA	Finish	Postseason
1991–92	40	9	39	1	2	21	138	220	4th of 4, Eastern; 8th of 8, NAHL	Information missing
1992–93	40	14	20	5	1	33	162	185	3rd of 4, Eastern; 6th of 8, NAHL	Information missing
1993–94	46	17	19	8	2	42	185	183	4th of 5, Eastern; 6th of 10, NAHL	Information missing
1994–95	44	20	19	4	1	45	162	199	5th of 9, NAHL	Information missing
1995–96*	* The team relocated to Gaylord in December 1995									
