= Summit at the Capital Centre =

American hockey arena

Coordinates: 42°40′55.3″N 84°39′17.6″W

- Interactive map of Summit at the Capital Centre
- Address: 9410 Davis Hwy
- Location: Dimondale, Michigan
- Operator: Oak View Group
- Type: Arena, Convention center

Construction
- Opened: 1999
- Closed: February 2021

The Summit at the Capital Centre was a 1,000-seat hockey arena located in Dimondale, Michigan, a suburb of Lansing, Michigan. It was primarily used for high school and youth hockey.

The arena was also a convention center, with 60,000 square feet (5,600 m^{2}) of space. Trade shows and other meetings had also been held there.

In February 2021, after 22 years of operation, the owners of The Summit announced it would be closing after being sold. News reports state the new owner has received permits from the Windsor Township Board to operate a marijuana grow operation in the facility.
