= Indianapolis Junior Ice =

- City: Indianapolis, Indiana
- League: North American Hockey League
- Founded: 1989
- Folded: 1995
- Colors: Black, silver and white
- Affiliate: Indianapolis Ice

Franchise history
- 1989–1995: Indianapolis Junior Ice

Championships
- Division titles: 1 (1992)

The Indianapolis Junior Ice were a Junior A ice hockey team that played in the North American Hockey League. The team was based out of Indianapolis, Indiana.

== History ==
The Indianapolis Junior Ice were admitted to North American Junior Hockey League as an expansion franchise in 1989. The team was an extension of the IHL's Indianapolis Ice. The team lasted for six years before folding in 1995.

== Season-by-season records ==
Season	GP	W	L	T	OTL	Pts	GF	GA	Finish	Playoffs
1989–90	44	16	23	5	-	37	214	219	3rd of 4, Western Div. 6th of 8, NAJHL	Missing information
1990–91	40	25	9	6	-	56	-	-	2nd of 4, Western Div. 3rd of 8, NAJHL	Missing information
1991–92	40	27	9	4	1	59	188	96	1st of 4, Western Div. 2nd of 8, NAJHL	Missing information
1992–93	40	27	3	7	3	64	230	157	2nd of 4, Western Div. 2nd of 8, NAHL	Missing information
1993–94	46	24	16	4	0	52	190	167	2nd of 5, Western Div. 4th of 10, NAHL	Missing information
1994–95	44	17	25	0	2	36	199	216	6th of 9, NAHL	Missing information
