= Bloomfield Jets =

- City: Bloomfield, Michigan
- League: NAJHL
- Founded: 1987
- Folded: 2005

Franchise history
- 1987–1990: Bloomfield Jets
- 1990–1995: Lakeland Jets
- 1995–2005: Soo Indians

The Bloomfield Jets were a Junior A ice hockey team playing in the North American Junior Hockey League. The team was based in Bloomfield, Michigan.

== History ==
The Bloomfield Jets were added as an expansion franchise to the North American Junior Hockey League. The team lasted for just three seasons, finishing last in the league each year, before relocating to Lakeland, Michigan. In its short time as a franchise, the Bloomfield Jets produced a future NHL all-star when Doug Weight played for the team in 1988–89.

== Season-by-season records ==
Season	GP	W	L	T	Pts	GF	GA	Finish	Playoffs
1987–88	32	5	27	0	10	103	243	6th of 6, NAJHL	Did not qualify
1988–89	40	6	31	3	15	166	277	4th of 4, Western Div. 8th of 8, NAJHL	Did not qualify
1989–90	44	4	33	7	15	181	353	4th of 4, Western Div. 8th of 8, NAJHL	Did not qualify
