= Lakeland Jets =

- City: Lakeland, Michigan
- League: NAHL
- Founded: 1987
- Folded: 2005

Franchise history
- 1987–1990: Bloomfield Jets
- 1990–1995: Lakeland Jets
- 1995–2005: Soo Indians

The Lakeland Jets were a Junior A ice hockey team playing in the North American Hockey League. The team was based in Lakeland, Michigan.

== History ==
In 1990, the Bloomfield Jets relocated to Lakeland, Michigan. After a pair of decent years immediately after arriving, the Lakeland Jets sunk to the bottom of the standings and didn't see much success afterwards. In 1995, the Sault Tribe purchased the franchise and moved it to Sault Ste. Marie, Michigan.

== Season-by-season records ==
Season	GP	W	L	T	OTL	Pts	GF	GA	Finish	Playoffs
1990–91	40	16	17	7	-	39	-	-	3rd of 4, Western Div. 6th of 8, NAJHL	Missing information
1991–92	40	22	16	2	-	46	169	181	2nd of 4, Western Div. 4th of 8, NAJHL	Missing information
1992–93	40	8	31	1	-	17	116	227	4th of 4, Western Div. 8th of 8, NAHL	Missing information
1993–94	46	15	24	5	-	35	193	223	4th of 5, Western Div. 8th of 10, NAHL	Missing information
1994–95	44	10	32	1	1	22	167	283	8th of 9, NAHL	Missing information
