= Springfield Spirit (NAHL) =

- City: Springfield, Missouri
- League: North American Hockey League
- Division: South
- Founded: 1990
- Home arena: Jordan Valley Ice Park
- Colors: Black, red and white

Franchise history
- 1990–1991: Dearborn Magic
- 1991–1994: Michigan Nationals
- 1994–1996: Dearborn Heights Nationals
- 1996–2001: St. Louis Sting
- 2001–2005: Springfield Spirit
- 2005–2006: Wasilla Spirit
- 2006–2012: Alaska Avalanche
- 2012–present: Johnstown Tomahawks

The Springfield Spirit were a Tier II junior ice hockey team in the North American Hockey League. The team played its home games at the Jordan Valley Ice Park in Springfield, Missouri.

== History ==
In 2001, the St. Louis Sting moved across the state to Springfield, Missouri, becoming the Springfield Spirit. After the four years, and only one playoff appearance, the team was sold and relocated to Wasilla, Alaska.

== Season-by-season records ==
Season	GP	W	L	OTL	PTS	GF	GA	PIM	Finish	Playoffs
2001–02	56	23	29	4	50	182	222	1,533	3rd of 5, West; 8th of 11, NAHL	Won Div. Semifinal series, 2–0 (Danville Wings); Lost Semifinal series, 1–2 (Detroit Compuware Ambassadors)
2002–03	56	15	36	5	35	129	240	1,689	5th of 5, West; 9th of 11, NAHL	Did not qualify
2003–04	56	13	39	4	30	153	259	1,803	7th of 7, South t-19th of 21, NAHL	Did not qualify
2004–05	56	20	29	7	47	144	188	1,027	6th of 7, South; 16th of 19, NAHL	Did not qualify
