= St. Louis Sting =

- City: Springfield, Missouri
- League: North American Hockey League
- Division: South
- Founded: 1990
- Home arena: U.S. Ice Sports Complex
- Colors: Red, blue and gold

Franchise history
- 1990–1991: Dearborn Magic
- 1991–1994: Michigan Nationals
- 1994–1996: Dearborn Heights Nationals
- 1996–2001: St. Louis Sting
- 2001–2005: Springfield Spirit
- 2005–2006: Wasilla Spirit
- 2006–2012: Alaska Avalanche
- 2012–present: Johnstown Tomahawks

Championships
- Division titles: 1 (1999)

The Springfield Spirit were a Tier II junior ice hockey team in the North American Hockey League. The team played its home games at the U.S. Ice Sports Complex in Chesterfield, Missouri.

== History ==
In 1996, the Dearborn Heights Nationals moved to the St. Louis region and become the St. Louis Sting. After the five years the team was sold and relocated to Springfield, Missouri.

== Season-by-season records ==
Season	GP	W	L	OTL	PTS	GF	GA	PIM	Finish	Playoffs
1996–97	46	8	38	0	16	123	248	—	8th of 8, NAHL	Lost Div. Semifinal series, 0–2 (Springfield Jr. Blues)
1997–98	56	23	32	1	47	188	237	1,718	7th of 9, NAHL	Lost Div. Semifinal series, 1–2 (Detroit Compuware Ambassadors)
1998–99	56	34	16	6	74	211	180	1,611	1st of 4, South; 3rd of 9, NAHL	Won Div. Semifinal series, 2–1 (Danville Wings); Won Robertson Cup Semifinal series, 2–1 (Springfield Jr. Blues); Lost Robertson Cup series, 0–3 (Detroit Compuware Ambassadors)
1999–2000	56	18	35	3	39	164	230	1,605	5th of 5, South t-9th of 11, NAHL	Did not qualify
2000–01	56	15	36	5	35	170	263	2,034	5th of 5, South; 11th of 11, NAHL	Did not qualify
