= Soo Indians =

- City: Sault Ste. Marie, Michigan
- League: NAHL
- Founded: 1987
- Folded: 2005
- Colors: Red, black, white

Franchise history
- 1987–1990: Bloomfield Jets
- 1990–1995: Lakeland Jets
- 1995–2005: Soo Indians

Championships
- Regular season titles: 1: 2001
- Division titles: 2: 2001, 2004

The Soo Indians were a Junior A ice hockey team playing in the North American Hockey League. The team was based in Sault Ste. Marie, Michigan.

== History ==
In 1995, the Sault Tribe purchased the Lakeland Jets and moved the franchise to Sault Ste. Marie, Michigan. The team was sponsored by the Kewadin Casinos and used as a both a link between the tribe and the local community as well as an advertisement for the casino. The team hired Joe Shawhan to serve as both head coach and GM and the move paid dividens as the team swiftly became a success. Over the course of 10 years, the Indians never had a losing season and twice won their division. However, the team did routinely lose to a lower-seeded team in the league playoffs.

2010 Vezina Trophy winner Ryan Miller was the starting goaltender for the Soo Indians for two seasons from 1997-1999, and was a fifth round pick in the 1999 NHL entry draft by the Buffalo Sabres. Miller is the only Indians alum to play in the NHL.

In January 2004, the Sault Tribe board of directors held a meeting and voted 6–4 in favor of defunding the team. This occurred despite the team possessing a 28–2–5 record at the time. Coach Shawhan opined that the decision was more a result of internal politics rather than anything to do with the team itself. The team was saved for one additional year but, after the 2005 season, the Indians folded and passed into history.

== Season-by-season records ==
Season	GP	W	L	T	OTL	Pts	GF	GA	Finish	Playoffs
1995–96	46	22	18	4	2	50	167	173	4th of 8, NAHL	Missing information
1996–97	46	28	18	-	0	56	169	159	t–3rd of 8, NAHL	Missing information
1997–98	56	35	20	-	1	71	203	138	3rd of 9, NAHL	Lost Quarterfinal series, 0–2 (USNTDP)
1998–99	56	37	18	-	1	74	211	180	2nd of 9, NAHL	Won Quarterfinal series, 2–0 (Grand Rapids Bearcats); Lost Semifinal series, 0–2 (Detroit Compuware Ambassadors)
1999–2000	56	35	15	-	6	76	187	142	2nd of 6, East Div. 4th of 11, NAHL	Won Quarterfinal series, 2–0 (Cleveland Jr. Barons); Lost Semifinal series, 0–2 (Texas Tornado)
2000–01	56	42	11	-	3	89	253	136	1st of 5, East Div. 1st of 10, NAHL	Won Quarterfinal series, 2–1 (Capital Centre Pride); Won Semifinal series, 0–2 (Cleveland Jr. Barons); Lost Championship series, 1–3 (Texas Tornado)
2001–02	56	34	18	-	4	72	214	170	4th of 6, East Div. 5th of 11, NAHL	Lost Quarterfinal series, 0–2 (Detroit Compuware Ambassadors)
2002–03	56	30	22	-	4	64	187	152	3rd of 6, East Div. 6th of 11, NAHL	Lost Quarterfinal series, 0–2 (Detroit Compuware Ambassadors)
2003–04	56	44	6	-	6	94	213	115	1st of 7, North Div. 2nd of 21, NAHL	Lost First Round series, 1–3 (USNTDP)
2004–05	56	33	17	-	2	71	170	141	2nd of 6, North Div. t-6th of 19, NAHL	Won Div. Semifinal series, 3–0 (Youngstown Phantoms); Lost Div. Final series, 3–4 (USNTDP); Lost Semifinal Round Robin, 3–1 (Bismarck Bobcats), 2–8 (Fargo-Moorhead Jets), 1–4 (Texas Tornado); Won Consolation game, 5–2 (Bismarck Bobcats)
