= Springfield Jr. Blues =

- City: Springfield, Illinois
- League: NAHL
- Division: Midwest
- Founded: 1993
- Home arena: Nelson Center
- Colors: Navy, Gold
- Owner: Dan Ferguson
- General manager: Todd Pococke
- Head coach: Todd Pococke
- Media: Hockey TV

Franchise history
- 1993–present: Springfield Jr. Blues

Championships
- Regular season titles: 3: 1996, 1997, 1998
- Robertson Cups: 2: 1996, 1997

The Springfield Jr. Blues are a Tier II junior ice hockey team in the North American Hockey League's Midwest Division. The team plays their home games at the Nelson Center in Springfield, Illinois.

== History ==
Founded by John D. O'Laughlin and Al Jennings, the franchise joined the North American Hockey League for the 1993–94 season. Springfield had previously been home to multiple semi-pro teams the Springfield Kings and Springfield Capitols. The team has made numerous appearances in the NAHL playoffs and were back-to-back Robertson Cup National Championships in 1996 and 1997.

Springfield logo (2017–2023)

Due to the ongoing COVID-19 pandemic that curtailed the 2019–20 season, the Jr. Blues suspended operations for the 2020–21 season.

== Season-by-season records ==
Season	GP	W	L	T	OTL	SOL	PTS	GF	GA	Finish	Postseason
1993–94	46	13	26	5	2	–	31	171	215	5th of 5, Western; 10th of 10, NAHL	Information missing
1994–95	44	32	8	2	2	–	68	275	148	2nd of 9, NAHL	Information missing
1995–96	46	34	7	4	1	–	74	270	147	1st of 8, NAHL	Won Quarterfinal series, 2–0 (Dearborn Heights Nationals); Won Semifinal series, 2–0 (Soo Indians); Won Robertson Cup Championship series, 2–1 (Detroit Compuware Ambassadors)
1996–97	46	35	10	–	1	–	71	230	144	1st of 8, NAHL	Won Quarterfinal series, 2–0 (St. Louis Sting); Won Semifinal series, 2–0 (Danville Wings); Won Robertson Cup Championship series, 2–1 (Detroit Compuware Ambassadors)
1997–98	56	42	12	–	2	–	86	274	175	1st of 9, NAHL	Won Quarterfinal series, 2–0 (Gaylord Grizzlies); Lost Semifinal series, 1–2 (USNTDP)
1998–99	56	32	20	–	4	–	68	189	178	2nd of 4, South; 4th of 9, NAHL	Won Quarterfinal series, 2–1 (Chicago Freeze); Lost Semifinal series, 1–2 (St. Louis Sting)
1999–2000	56	28	24	–	4	–	60	190	183	3rd of 5, West; 6th of 11, NAHL	Lost Div. Semifinal series, 0–2 (Danville Wings)
2000–01	56	19	36	–	1	–	39	164	276	4th of 5, West t-8th of 10, NAHL	Lost Div. Semifinal series, 0–2 (Texas Tornado)
2001–02	56	12	38	–	6	–	30	147	266	5th of 5, West; 11th of 11, NAHL	Did not qualify
2002–03	56	20	27	–	9	–	49	191	237	4th of 5, West; 8th of 11, NAHL	Lost Div. Semifinal series, 0–2 (Texas Tornado)
2003–04	56	34	18	–	4	–	72	194	143	2nd of 7, North t-4th of 21, NAHL	Won Div. Semifinal series, 3–2 (Cleveland Jr. Barons); Won Div. Final series, 3–0 (USNTDP); Lost Semifinal series, 5–2 (Fairbanks Ice Dogs), 2–3 (Bismarck Bobcats), 0–1 (Texas Tornado); Won Consolation Game, 3–5 (Fairbanks Ice Dogs)
2004–05	56	30	25	–	1	–	61	207	200	5th of 7, South; 10th of 19, NAHL	Did not qualify
2005–06	56	28	26	–	4	–	60	181	208	3rd of 5, South; 11th of 20, NAHL	Lost Div. Semifinal series, 1–3 (Texarkana Bandits)
2006–07	56	26	31	–	5	–	57	188	203	6th of 6, Central; 13th of 17, NAHL	Did not qualify
2007–08	58	27	26	–	5	–	59	190	190	4th of 6, Central; 11th of 18, NAHL	Won Div. Semifinal series, 3–0 (North Iowa Outlaws); Won Div. Final series, 2–3 (Alexandria Blizzard)
2008–09	58	25	28	–	5	–	55	183	185	4th of 4, South; 15th of 19, NAHL	Won Div. Semifinal series, 3–0 (North Iowa Outlaws); Lost Div. Final series, 2–3 (Alexandria Blizzard)
2009–10	58	21	29	–	8	–	50	163	193	4th of 5, South; 14th of 19, NAHL	Lost Div. Semifinal series, 1–3 (Topeka RoadRunners)
2010–11	58	31	24	–	3	–	65	191	170	5th of 8, North; 15th of 26, NAHL	Did not qualify
2011–12	60	31	27	–	2	–	64	202	190	3rd of 5, Midwest t-17th of 28, NAHL	Won Div. Semifinal series, 3–2 (Janesville Jets); Lost Div. Final series, 1–3 (St. Louis Bandits)
2012–13	60	26	30	–	4	–	56	159	181	t-6th of 8, North t-16th of 24, NAHL	Lost Div. Play-in series, 0–2 (Kalamazoo Jr. K-Wings)
2013–14	60	26	26	–	8	–	60	141	160	5th of 6, North; 17th of 24, NAHL	Did not qualify
2014–15	60	23	31	–	6	–	52	126	184	6th of 6, North; 20th of 24, NAHL	Did not qualify
2015–16	60	29	25	–	6	–	64	155	164	5th of 6, Midwest; 13th of 22, NAHL	Did not qualify
2016–17	60	27	28	–	4	1	59	174	189	5th of 6, Midwest; 18th of 24, NAHL	Did not qualify
2017–18	60	33	21	–	5	1	72	169	166	3rd of 6, Midwest t-8th of 23, NAHL	Lost Div. Semifinal series, 0–3 (Janesville Jets)
2018–19	60	33	22	–	4	1	71	192	177	3rd of 6, Midwest; 9th of 24, NAHL	Lost Div. Semifinal series, 1–3 (Minnesota Magicians)
2019–20	48	14	29	–	2	3	33	116	169	6th of 6, Midwest; 10th of 23, NAHL	Postseason cancelled
2020–21	Franchise suspended play due to COVID-19 pandemic										
2021–22	60	36	20	–	2	2	76	211	177	2nd of 8, Midwest; 7th of 29, NAHL	Lost Div. Semifinal series, 0–3 (Anchorage Wolverines)
2022–23	60	26	31	–	1	2	55	147	174	t-7th of 8, Midwest t-25th of 29, NAHL	Did not qualify
2023–24	60	21	29	–	9	1	52	151	218	t-6th of 8, Midwest t-25th of 32, NAHL	Did not qualify
2024–25	59	27	27	–	3	2	59	158	182	6th of 8, Midwest; 21st of 35, NAHL	Did not qualify
