= Detroit Freeze =

- City: Fraser, Michigan
- League: North American Hockey League
- Division: West
- Founded: 1992
- Folded: 2003
- Home arena: Fraser Ice Arenas
- Colors: Teal, White and Black

Franchise history
- 1992–1997: Detroit Freeze
- 1997–2003: Chicago Freeze

Championships
- Regular season titles: 1993
- Division titles: 1993

The Detroit Freeze was a Tier II junior A ice hockey team in the North American Hockey League. The team played out of the Fraser Ice Arenas in Fraser, Michigan, a suburb of Detroit In 1997, the franchise relocated to Geneva, Illinois and became the Chicago Freeze.

== Regular season ==
Statistics source:

Season	Games	W	L	T	OTL	PTS	GF	GA	Finish	Playoffs
1992–93	40	29	8	3	0	61	240	154	1st of 4, Eastern; 1st of 8, NAHL	Information missing
1993–94	46	14	25	5	2	33	168	228	5th of 5, Eastern; 9th of 10, NAHL	Information missing
1994–95	44	31	12	1	0	63	268	181	3rd of 9, NAHL	Information missing
1995–96	46	25	16	4	1	55	211	177	3rd of 9, NAHL	Won Quarterfinal series, 2–0 (Gaylord Grizzlies); Lost Semifinal series, 0–2 (Detroit Compuware Ambassadors)
1996–97	46	21	23	–	2	44	184	186	5th of 8, NAHL	Lost Quarterfinal series, 1–2 (Danville Wings)

== Notable alumni ==
- Damon Whitten, left wing: 1995–96 season
