= North American Hockey League =

US Tier II junior ice hockey league

- Current season, competition or edition: 2026–27 NAHL season
- Sport: Ice hockey
- Founded: 1975
- CEO: Mark Frankenfeld
- No. of teams: 36
- Country: United States
- Most recent champion: Maryland Black Bears (1st title)
- Most titles: Detroit Jr. Red Wings (SOJHL) (11)
- Website: www.nahl.com

The North American Hockey League (NAHL) is a Tier II junior ice hockey league based in the United States. Sanctioned by USA Hockey, it acts as an alternative for those who would not or did not make the roster of a team in the Major Junior Canadian Hockey League (CHL) nor Tier I United States Hockey League (USHL). One of the oldest junior hockey leagues in the United States, the NAHL is headquartered in Addison, Texas.

The teams span the United States from Maine in the East to Alaska in the Northwest and to Texas in the South. The teams play a 59-game regular season, usually starting on the 2nd weekend in September and ending near mid-April (2020–21 season is exception, the season started in late 2020-early 2021 due to the COVID-19 pandemic). The Champions of each division (not regular season) will play in Blaine, MN at the Fogerty Arena and will compete for the Robertson Cup Champion.

Under USA Hockey Tier II sanctioning, NAHL teams do not charge players to play and also provide players with uniforms, team clothing and select equipment such as sticks, gloves and helmets. Players without local family live with billet families in their area and pay a monthly stipend that covers food and other costs. Unlike the Tier I United States Hockey League, there are no roster restrictions in the NAHL on overage players, which allows for the older players to gain extra NCAA exposure as well as teams to retain a veteran core. Teams are still bound to USA Hockey rules regarding import players, and presently each team is allowed to have four non-American players on their roster. Import players may also apply for an exemption from being counted as an import, but only if they have played hockey in the United States for four years prior.

From its beginning in 1975, the NAHL was primarily a 6–12-team league based in the Midwest, known as the Great Lakes Junior Hockey League and changed the name to the North American Hockey League in 1984. The league's all-time leading scorer is Ryan Fultz who tallied 246 points in four seasons. Other notable alumni from the NAHL include Pat LaFontaine, Mike Modano, Doug Weight, Pat Peake, Brian Rolston, Brian Holzinger, Brian Rafalski, Todd Marchant, John Scott, Connor Hellebuyck, and George Parros. In 2003, the league merged with the now defunct America West Hockey League to form a 19-team league.

On June 12, 2026, the NAHL announced it had added a Mountain Division to the league, consisting of five teams to begin play in the states of Colorado, Idaho, Montana and Utah for the 2026–27 season.

== Teams ==
=== Current teams ===
The 2026–27 season has 36 teams playing in five divisions:

North American Hockey League team locations
Central
East
Midwest
South
Mountain

Division	Team	Location	Arena	Founded	Joined
Central	Aberdeen Wings	Aberdeen, South Dakota	Odde Ice Center	2010	
Central	Austin Bruins	Austin, Minnesota	Riverside Arena	2010	
Central	Bismarck Bobcats	Bismarck, North Dakota	V.F.W. Sports Center	1997	2003
Central	Minot Minotauros	Minot, North Dakota	Maysa Arena	2011	
Central	St. Cloud Norsemen	St. Cloud, Minnesota	St. Cloud Municipal Athletic Complex	2003*	
Central	Watertown Shamrocks	Watertown, South Dakota	Prairie Lakes Ice Arena	2024	
East	Danbury Jr. Hat Tricks	Danbury, Connecticut	Danbury Ice Arena	2010*	
East	Elmira Aviators	Elmira, New York	First Arena	2024	
East	Johnstown Tomahawks	Johnstown, Pennsylvania	Cambria County War Memorial Arena	1990*	
East	Maryland Black Bears	Odenton, Maryland	Piney Orchard Ice Arena	2018	
East	New Hampshire Mountain Kings	Hooksett, New Hampshire	Tri-Town Ice Arena	2023	
East	New Jersey Titans	Middletown Township, New Jersey	Middletown Ice World Arena	2005*	
East	Northeast Generals	Canton, Massachusetts	Canton Ice House	2016	
East	Philadelphia Rebels	Washington Township, New Jersey	Hollydell Ice Arena	2008*	
Midwest	Anchorage Wolverines	Anchorage, Alaska	Sullivan Arena	2021	
Midwest	Fairbanks Ice Dogs	Fairbanks, Alaska	Big Dipper Ice Arena	1997	2003
Midwest	Janesville Jets	Janesville, Wisconsin	Woodman's Center	2009	
Midwest	Kenai River Brown Bears	Soldotna, Alaska	Soldotna Regional Sports Complex	2007	
Midwest	Minnesota Mallards	Forest Lake, Minnesota	Forest Lake Sports Center	2024	
Midwest	Minnesota Wilderness	Cloquet, Minnesota	Northwoods Credit Union Arena	2000	2013
Midwest	Springfield Jr. Blues	Springfield, Illinois	Nelson Center	1993	
Midwest	Wisconsin Windigo	Brookfield, Wisconsin	The Ponds of Brookfield	2010*	
South	Amarillo Wranglers	Amarillo, Texas	Amarillo Civic Center	2003*	
South	Corpus Christi IceRays	Corpus Christi, Texas	Hilliard Center	2001*	
South	El Paso Rhinos	El Paso, Texas	El Paso County Events Center	2006	2021
South	Houston Bulls	Richmond, Texas	Deep South Ice & Sports Center	2008*	
South	Lone Star Brahmas	North Richland Hills, Texas	NYTEX Sports Centre	1999*	
South	New Mexico Ice Wolves	Albuquerque, New Mexico	Outpost Ice Arenas	2019	
South	Odessa Jackalopes	Odessa, Texas	Ector County Coliseum	2008*	
South	Oklahoma Warriors	Oklahoma City, Oklahoma	Blazers Ice Center	2020*	
South	Shreveport Mudbugs	Shreveport, Louisiana	Hirsch Memorial Coliseum	2016	
Mountain
Mountain	Billings Cattle Punchers	Billings, Montana	Signal Peak Energy Arena	2026	
Mountain	Grand Junction River Hawks	Grand Junction, Colorado	River City Sportsplex	2025	2026
Mountain	Idaho Falls Spud Kings	Idaho Falls, Idaho	Mountain America Center	2022	2026
Mountain	Ogden Mustangs	Ogden, Utah	The Ice Sheet at Ogden	2009	2026
Mountain	Pueblo Peppers	Pueblo, Colorado	Pueblo Ice Arena	2005*	

Note: An asterisk (*) denotes a franchise relocation. See respective team articles from more information.

=== Past teams ===
- Alaska Avalanche (Wasilla, Alaska, for 2006–2010; Palmer, Alaska, for 2010–2012; relocated to Johnstown, Pennsylvania, and renamed Johnstown Tomahawks)
- Albert Lea Thunder (Albert Lea, Minnesota; 2008–2010; relocated to Amarillo, Texas, and renamed Amarillo Bulls)
- Amarillo Bulls (Amarillo, Texas; 2010–2021; relocated to Mason City, Iowa, as the North Iowa Bulls)
- Aston Rebels (Aston, Pennsylvania; 2015–2017; was relocated and renamed to Philadelphia Rebels)
- Alexandria Blizzard (Alexandria, Minnesota; 2006–2012; relocated to Brookings, South Dakota, and renamed Brookings Blizzard)
- Alpena IceDiggers (Alpena, Michigan; 2005–2010; relocated to Corpus Christi, Texas, and renamed Corpus Christi IceRays)
- Billings Bulls (Billings, Montana; 2003–2006; joined the NorPac)
- Bloomfield Jets (Bloomfield, Michigan; 1987–90; relocated to Lakeland, Michigan, and renamed Lakeland Jets)
- Bozeman Icedogs (Bozeman, Montana; 2003–2006; joined the NorPac)
- Brookings Blizzard (Brookings, South Dakota; 2012–2019; relocated to St. Cloud, Minnesota as the St. Cloud Blizzard)
- Buffalo Jr. Sabres (Buffalo, New York; 1983–1986; later members of the OJHL)
- C & H Piping (Melvindale, Michigan; 1988–89; renamed Melvindale Blades)
- Capital Centre Pride (Lansing, Michigan; 2000–03)
- Central Texas Blackhawks (Belton, Texas; 2003–2005; renamed Central Texas Marshals for the 2004–05 season before ceasing operations at the end of the season)
- Chicago Cougars (Chicago, Illinois; 1986–87; folded midseason)
- Chicago Freeze (Chicago, Illinois; 1997–2003; folded due to "increased operation costs and low attendance")
- Chicago Hitmen (Chicago, Illinois; 2010–2012; announced it would not play the 2012–13 season on May 11, 2012)
- Chicago Patriots (Chicago, Illinois; 1986–87; folded midseason)
- Chicago Young Americans (Chicago, Illinois; 1987–1989)
- Chippewa Steel (Chippewa Falls, Wisconsin; 2018–2026; sold and relocated to Pueblo, Colorado, renamed as Pueblo Peppers)
- Cleveland Jr. Barons (1st) (Brooklyn, Ohio; 1976–1979; withdrew from the league prior to the 1979–80 GLJHL season)
- Cleveland Jr. Barons (2nd) (Parma, Ohio; 1990–2006; relocated to Columbus, Ohio, renamed Ohio Junior Blue Jackets and joined the USHL)
- Colorado Grit (Greeley, Colorado; (2023-25); given inactive status by league governors for the 2025-26 season, did not return for 2026-27 season)
- Coulee Region Chill (La Crosse, Wisconsin; 2010–2018; sold and relocated to Chippewa Falls, Wisconsin, as the Chippewa Steel)
- Danville Wings (Danville, Illinois, 1994–2003; joined the USHL)
- Dawson Creek Rage (Dawson Creek, British Columbia; 2010–2012; ceased operations after 2011–12 season; franchise sold to Wilkes-Barre/Scranton Knights in 2015)
- Dayton Gems (Dayton, Ohio; 2003–04; dissolved after 21 games, roster dispersed amongst remaining teams)
- Dearborn Heights Nationals (Dearborn Heights, Michigan; 1994–1996; formerly Michigan Nationals; relocated to St. Louis, Missouri and renamed St. Louis Sting)
- Dearborn Magic (Dearborn, Michigan; 1990–91; renamed Michigan Nationals)
- Detroit Compuware Ambassadors (Detroit, Michigan; 1984–2003)
- Detroit Falcons (Fraser, Michigan; 1986–87; formerly St. Clair Shores Falcons)
- Detroit Freeze (Fraser, Michigan; 1992–1997; moved to Chicago and renamed the Chicago Freeze)
- Detroit Jr. Wings (Detroit, Michigan; 1975–1983 GLJHL, 1987–1992 NAHL; Junior Red Wings moved to the OHL; replaced by the Detroit Freeze)
- Detroit Little Caesars (Detroit, Michigan; 1975–76; only played in the inaugural season of the GLJHL)
- Fargo-Moorhead Jets (Fargo, North Dakota; 2003–2008; ceased operations after 2007-2008 season)
- Fernie Ghostriders (Fernie, British Columbia; 2003–04; franchise rights were sold to a Kalamazoo, Michigan based group in 2003; joined the KIJHL)
- Fraser Flags (Fraser, Michigan; 1981–1984)
- Fraser Highlanders (Fraser, Michigan; 1976–1980)
- Fresno Monsters (Fresno, California; 2010–2013; relocated to Wenatchee, Washington, and renamed Wenatchee Wild)
- Gaylord Grizzlies (Gaylord, Michigan; 1995–1998; formerly Saginaw Gears until relocating in December 1995; relocated to Grand Rapids, Michigan, and renamed Grand Rapids Bearcats)
- Grand Rapids Bearcats (Grand Rapids, Michigan; 1998–2000; renamed Grand Rapids Rockets during the 1999–2000 season when the league took over the franchise; relocated to Lansing and renamed Capital Centre Pride)
- Helena Bighorns (Helena, Montana; 2003–2006; joined the NorPac)
- Hennessey Engineers (Plymouth, Michigan; 1985–1987)
- Indianapolis Jr. Ice (Indianapolis, Indiana; 1989–1995)
- Jamestown Ironmen (Jamestown, New York; 2011–2013; ceased operations after 2012–13 season due to ownership issues)
- Jamestown Rebels (Jamestown, New York; 2018–2022; moved from Philadelphia after one season, returned once a new arena had been secured)
- Kalamazoo Jr. Wings (Kalamazoo, Michigan; 1989–1994; relocated to Danville, Illinois, and renamed Danville Wings)
- Kalamazoo Jr. K-Wings (Kalamazoo, Michigan; 2011–2013; ceased operations after 2012–13 season)
- Keystone Ice Miners (Connellsville, Pennsylvania; 2014–15; ceased operations after one season in Pennsylvania)
- Kansas City Scouts (Kansas City, Kansas; 2020–21; relocated during COVID-19 pandemic. Never played a game before relocating and becoming the Amarillo Wranglers)
- Lakeland Jets (Lakeland, Michigan; 1990–1995; relocated to Sault Ste. Marie, Michigan, and renamed Soo Indians)
- Lone Star Cavalry (North Richland Hills, Texas; 2003–04; relocated to Santa Fe, New Mexico, and renamed Santa Fe RoadRunners)
- Lytes Rustlers (1990–91; Traveling team composed of west coast prospects played for one season)
- Mahoning Valley Phantoms (Boardman, Ohio; 2005–2009; relocated to Youngstown, Ohio, moved to the USHL, and renamed Youngstown Phantoms)
- Maine Nordiques (Lewiston and Auburn, Maine; 2019–2026)
- Marquette Rangers (Marquette, Michigan; 2006–2010; relocated to Flint, Michigan, and renamed Michigan Warriors)
- Melvindale Blades (Melvindale, Michigan; 1989–90)
- Melvindale Lakers (Melvindale, Michigan; 1982–83)
- Michigan Nationals (Dearborn, Michigan; 1991–1994; renamed Dearborn Heights Nationals)
- Michigan Warriors (Flint, Michigan; 2010–2015; suspended operations after being displaced by the OHL's Flint Firebirds)
- Minnesota Blizzard (Alexandria, Minnesota; 2003–2006; renamed Alexandria Blizzard)
- Minnesota Magicians (Richfield, Minnesota; 2013–2022; relocated to Eagle River, Wisconsin, renamed Wisconsin Windigo)
- Motor City Machine (Detroit, Michigan; 2008–09; renamed Motor City Metal Jackets)
- Motor City Metal Jackets (Detroit, Michigan, 2009–2011; relocated to Jamestown, New York, renamed Jamestown Ironmen).
- New Mexico Mustangs (Rio Rancho, New Mexico; 2010–2012: purchased and relocated to Richfield, Minnesota, after a one-year hiatus and renamed Minnesota Magicians)
- Niagara Scenic (West Seneca, New York; 1987–1994)
- North Iowa Bulls (Mason City, Iowa; 2021–2026; relocated to Richmond, Texas, as the Houston Bulls)
- North Iowa Outlaws (Mason City, Iowa; 2005–2010; relocated to Onalaska, Wisconsin, and renamed Coulee Region Chill)
- Oakland Chiefs (Oakland, Michigan; 1975–76; relocated to Wayne, Michigan, and renamed Wayne Chiefs)
- Owatonna Express (Owatonna, Minnesota; 2008–2011; relocated to Odessa, Texas, and renamed Odessa Jackalopes)
- Paddock Pool Saints (Ecorse, Michigan; 1975–1984; won seven straight GLJHL titles)
- Pittsburgh Forge (Pittsburgh, Pennsylvania; 2001–2003; relocated to Toledo, Ohio, and renamed Toledo IceDiggers)
- Port Huron Fighting Falcons (Port Huron, Michigan; 2010–2014; relocated to Connellsville, Pennsylvania, and renamed Keystone Ice Miners)
- Port Huron Fogcutters (Port Huron, Michigan; 1975–76)
- Redford Royals (Redford, Michigan; 1978–1984, 1987–1989)
- Rio Grande Valley Killer Bees (Hidalgo, Texas; 2013–2015; relocated to Aston, Pennsylvania, and renamed the Aston Rebels)
- Rochester Jr. Americans (Rochester, New York; 1999–2000; played one season before disbanding, program later revived)
- Rochester Jr. Americans (Fairport, New York; (2023-26); given inactive status by league governors for the 2026-27 season)
- Saginaw Gears (Saginaw, Michigan; 1991–1995; relocated in midseason to Gaylord, Michigan, and renamed Gaylord Grizzlies)
- Santa Fe RoadRunners (Santa Fe, New Mexico; 2004–2007; relocated to Topeka, Kansas, and renamed Topeka RoadRunners)
- Soo Eagles (Sault Ste. Marie, Michigan; 2012–2015; returned to NOJHL and franchise relocated to Middletown, New Jersey, and renamed the New Jersey Titans)
- Soo Indians (Sault Ste. Marie, Michigan; 1995–2005)
- Southern Minnesota Express (Owatonna, Minnesota; 2005–2008; relocated to Detroit area and renamed Motor City Machine)
- Springfield Spirit (Springfield, Missouri; 2001–2005; relocated to Wasilla, Alaska, and renamed Wasilla Spirit)
- St. Clair Shores Falcons (St. Clair Shores, Michigan; 1983–1986; relocated to Fraser, Michigan, and renamed Detroit Cougars for one season)
- St. Cloud Blizzard (St. Cloud, Minnesota; 2019–2020; rebranded as the St. Cloud Norsemen in 2020)
- St. Louis Bandits (St. Louis, Missouri; 2006–2012; purchased and relocated to Cloquet, Minnesota, after a one-year hiatus and to be used by the Minnesota Wilderness)
- St. Louis Sting (St. Louis, Missouri; 1996–2001; relocated to Springfield, Missouri, and renamed Springfield Spirit)
- Texarkana Bandits (Texarkana, Arkansas; 2003–2006; relocated to St. Louis, Missouri, and renamed St. Louis Bandits)
- Texas Tornado (North Richland Hills, Texas for 1999–2008; hiatus for 2008–09 season; Frisco, Texas for 2009–13; relocated to back North Richland Hills in 2013 and renamed Lone Star Brahmas)
- Toledo IceDiggers (Toledo, Ohio; 2003–2005; relocated to Alpena, Michigan, and renamed Alpena IceDiggers)
- Topeka Pilots (Topeka, Kansas; 2018–2020; relocated to the Kansas City metropolitan area as the Kansas City Scouts, but never played before being relocating again as the Amarillo Wranglers)
- Topeka RoadRunners (Topeka, Kansas; 2007–2018; renamed Topeka Pilots under new ownership)
- Traverse City North Stars (Traverse City, Michigan; 2005–2012; franchise purchased and relocated to be used by the Soo Eagles)
- USNTDP (Ann Arbor, Michigan; 1996–2009; moved to USHL)
- Wasilla Spirit (Wasilla, Alaska; 2005–06; renamed Alaska Avalanche)
- Waterford Lakers (Waterford, Michigan; 1981–82)
- Wayne Chiefs (Wayne, Michigan; 1976–1980)
- Wenatchee Wild (1st) (Wenatchee, Washington; 2008–2013; relocated to Hidalgo, Texas, and renamed Rio Grande Valley Killer Bees; Wild returned with the Fresno membership)
- Wenatchee Wild (2nd) (Wenatchee, Washington; 2013–2015; former Fresno franchise; joined the BCHL following the 2014–15 season)
- Western Michigan Wolves (Kalamazoo, Michigan; 1988–89; renamed Kalamazoo Jr. Wings)
- Wichita Falls Rustlers (Wichita Falls, Texas; 2003–04; renamed Wichita Falls Wildcats)
- Wichita Falls Warriors (Wichita Falls, Texas; 2020–2; relocated Oklahoma City, Oklahoma; renamed Oklahoma Warriors)
- Wichita Falls Wildcats (Wichita Falls, Texas; 2004–2017; folded)
- Wilkes-Barre/Scranton Knights (Pittston, Pennsylvania; 2015–2020; sold and relocated as Danbury Jr. Hat Tricks)
- Youngstown Phantoms (Boardman, Ohio; 2003–2005; renamed Mahoning Valley Phantoms when the Central Hockey League's Youngstown SteelHounds began play in 2005)

== Timeline of league membership ==
Active Inactive Future Active non-member

== Playoff structure ==
=== Midwest and Central ===
Top 4 teams qualify, and in the 1st round (Division Semi-Finals), the 1st seed (seeding based on placement in division) plays the 4th seed and the 2nd seed plays the 3rd seed in a 2H-2A-1H best of 5 Series. The winners of those two series will play each other in the Division Finals with the same 2H-2A-1H Best of 5 format. The winner of the Division Finals will be crowned the Division Champions and will represent the Division in the Final Four, hosted at the Fogerty Ice Arena in Blaine, Minnesota.

=== South and East ===
The top 6 teams qualify, with the 1st seed and 2nd seed (seeding based on placement in division) getting byes. Seeds 3, 4, 5, and 6 will all play in the play-in, which happens around early-to-mid April. The 3 seed will host the 6 seed for all 3 games,* as the 4th seed will also host the 5th seed for all 3 games.* The winner with the lowest seed will play the 1st seed, and the winner with the highest seed will play the 2nd seed. From there, the format is the same as the Midwest and Central.

== Robertson Cup winners ==
The Robertson Cup Championship is a playoff series held at the end of the NAHL season. The trophy is awarded annually to the USA Hockey Tier II junior national playoff champion. The Cup is the oldest junior hockey trophy in the United States and is named in honor of Chuck Robertson, a pioneer of junior hockey in the NAHL and youth hockey in the state of Michigan. Chuck Robertson was the owner of the Paddock Pool Saints when they won a record seven straight NAHL championships from 1976 to 1983.

As of the 2023–24 season

- 1975-76 – Detroit Little Caesars(1)
- 1976-77 – Paddock Pool Saints(1)
- 1977-78 – Paddock Pool Saints(2)
- 1978-79 – Paddock Pool Saints(3)
- 1979-80 – Paddock Pool Saints(4)
- 1980-81 – Paddock Pool Saints(5)
- 1981-82 – Paddock Pool Saints(6)
- 1982-83 – Paddock Pool Saints(7)
- 1983-84 – St. Clair Shores Falcons(1)
- 1984-85 – St. Clair Shores Falcons(2)
- 1985-86 – Compuware Ambassadors(1)
- 1986-87 – Compuware Ambassadors(2)
- 1987-88 – Compuware Ambassadors(3)
- 1988-89 – Compuware Ambassadors(4)
- 1989-90 – Compuware Ambassadors(5)
- 1990-91 – Kalamazoo Jr. K Wings(1)
- 1991-92 – Compuware Ambassadors(6)
- 1992-93 – Kalamazoo Jr. K Wings(2)
- 1993-94 – Compuware Ambassadors(7)
- 1994-95 – Compuware Ambassadors(8)
- 1995-96 – Springfield Jr. Blues(1)
- 1996-97 – Springfield Jr. Blues(2)
- 1997-98 – Compuware Ambassadors(9)
- 1998-99 – Compuware Ambassadors(10)
- 1999-2000 – Danville Wings(1)
- 2000-01 – Texas Tornado(1)
- 2001-02 – Compuware Ambassadors(11)
- 2002-03 – Pittsburgh Forge(1)
- 2003-04 – Texas Tornado(2)
- 2004-05 – Texas Tornado(3)
- 2005-06 – Texas Tornado(4)
- 2006-07 – St. Louis Bandits(1)
- 2007-08 – St. Louis Bandits(2)
- 2008-09 – St. Louis Bandits(3)
- 2009-10 – Bismarck Bobcats(1)
- 2010-11 – Fairbanks Ice Dogs(1)
- 2011-12 – Texas Tornado(5)
- 2012-13 – Amarillo Bulls(1)
- 2013-14 – Fairbanks Ice Dogs(2)
- 2014-15 – Minnesota Wilderness(1)
- 2015-16 – Fairbanks Ice Dogs(3)
- 2016-17 – Lone Star Brahmas(1)
- 2017-18 – Shreveport Mudbugs(1)
- 2018-19 – Aberdeen Wings(1)
- 2019-20 – Not awarded due to the COVID-19 pandemic
- 2021 – Shreveport Mudbugs(2)
- 2021-22 – New Jersey Titans(1)
- 2022-23 – Oklahoma Warriors(1)
- 2023-24 – Lone Star Brahmas(2)
- 2024-25 – Bismarck Bobcats (2)
- 2025-26 – Maryland Black Bears(1)
