= Phil Kessel =

American ice hockey player (born 1987)

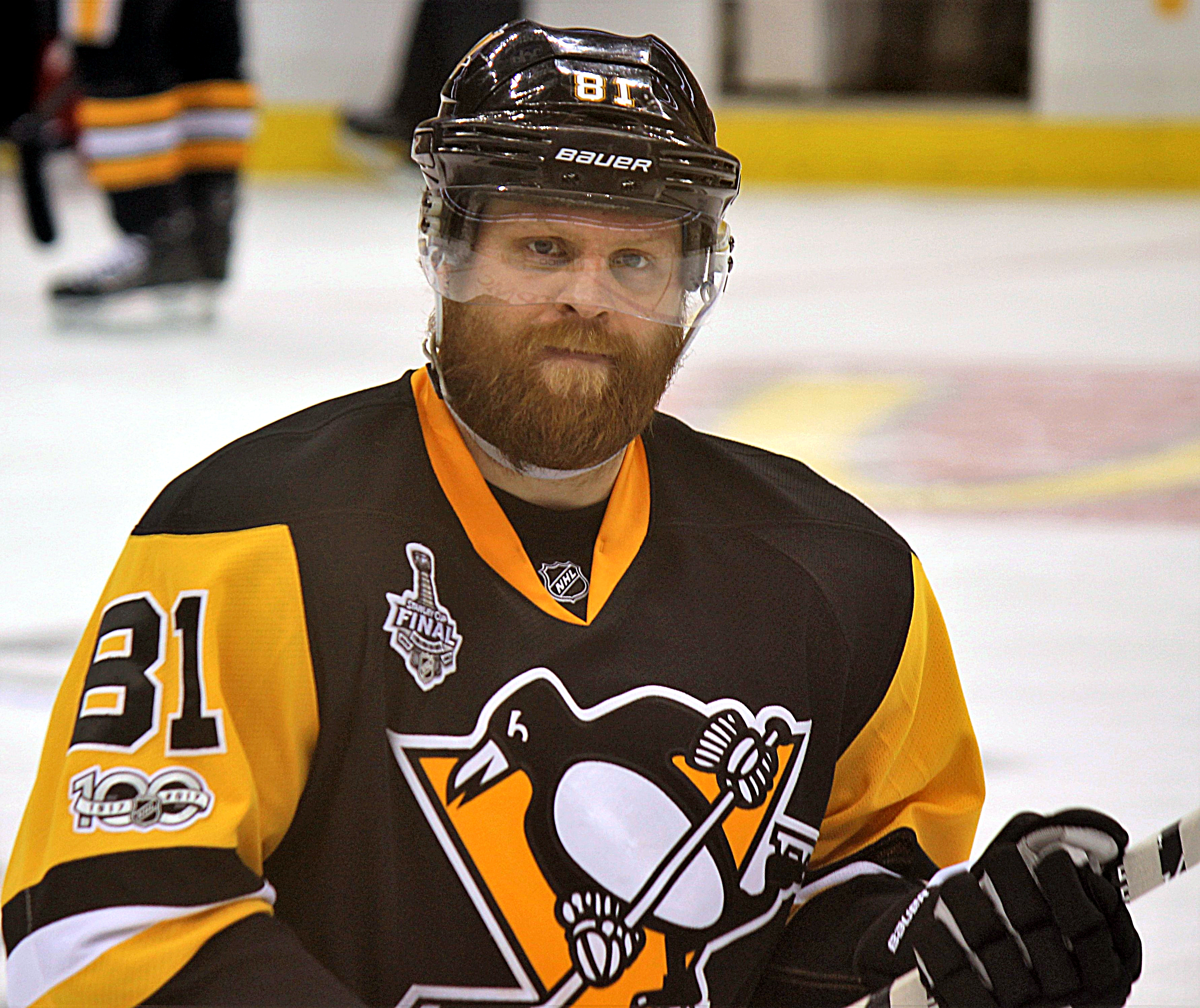
- Kessel with the Pittsburgh Penguins in 2017
- Born: October 2, 1987 (age 39) Madison, Wisconsin, U.S.
- Height: 5 ft 11 in (180 cm)
- Weight: 208 lb (94 kg; 14 st 12 lb)
- Position: Right wing
- Shoots: Right
- NHL team Former teams: Free Agent; Boston Bruins; Toronto Maple Leafs; Pittsburgh Penguins; Arizona Coyotes; Vegas Golden Knights
- National team: United States
- NHL draft: 5th overall, 2006; Boston Bruins
- Playing career: 2006–present

Philip Joseph Kessel Jr. (born October 2, 1987) is an American professional ice hockey winger who is an unrestricted free agent. Nicknamed "Phil the Thrill", he has previously played for the Boston Bruins, Toronto Maple Leafs, Pittsburgh Penguins, Arizona Coyotes, and the Vegas Golden Knights of the National Hockey League (NHL). Kessel is a three-time Stanley Cup champion, winning back-to-back championships with the Penguins in 2016 and 2017 and with the Golden Knights in 2023.

Kessel is a product of the USA Hockey National Team Development Program as an identified elite player under the age of 18. He finished his amateur career playing collegiate hockey in the NCAA for the University of Minnesota in the Western Collegiate Hockey Association (WCHA). He was then selected fifth overall in the 2006 NHL entry draft by the Boston Bruins. After his rookie season, 2006–07, he was awarded the Bill Masterton Memorial Trophy for overcoming testicular cancer while continuing his professional career. In 2009, Kessel was traded from Boston to the Toronto Maple Leafs where he spent six seasons before being dealt to the Pittsburgh Penguins in 2015. Kessel won his first and second Stanley Cup championships with the Pittsburgh Penguins in back-to-back seasons with wins over the San Jose Sharks and the Nashville Predators, respectively; he then won a third Stanley Cup championship with the Vegas Golden Knights in 2023, over the Florida Panthers.

Kessel is known as a natural goal scorer, having totaled 400 goals over the course of his career, and for holding the all-time NHL ironman record for the most consecutive games played, with 1,064; during the 2020–21 season, he became the fifth player ever to record 900 consecutive games played. During the 2022–23 season, Kessel passed Keith Yandle's streak as the longest in NHL history on October 25, 2022, after playing his 990th consecutive game; several weeks later, on November 17, Kessel became the first player in NHL history to play 1,000 consecutive games. Kessel's streak spanned 1,064 consecutive games from the onset of the 2009–10 season. As of the 2026–27 NHL season the streak stands as the NHL record.

Kessel plays internationally for the United States, and has played at three World Championships and the 2010 and 2014 Winter Olympics, winning a silver medal in 2010 and being named the top forward in 2014.

== Playing career ==
=== Amateur ===
Kessel played youth hockey with the AAA Madison Capitols in his hometown of Madison, Wisconsin. An offensive standout from a young age, Kessel put up 286 points (176 goals and 110 assists) in 86 games with his AAA bantam squad in 2001–02. He followed up on that effort the next year with the Capitols under-18 team where, during the 2002–03 season, he produced 158 points (113 goals and 45 assists) in 71 games. Kessel credits former Capitols coach and 1980 U.S. Olympian Bob Suter for becoming the player he is today.

For the 2003–04 season, Kessel moved to Ann Arbor, Michigan, to join the United States National Team Development Program's U17 squad. He set NTDP records for goals (52) for a U17–18 players. During the 2004–05 season, Kessel played full-time on the U18 team scoring 52 goals and 98 points, both of which were, at the time, records for an U18 player. His points record was surpassed by Patrick Kane who recorded 102 points and the same 52 goals in the next 2005–06 season. Almost 15 years later, on March 15, 2019, another Wisconsin phenom Cole Caufield scored a career-high six goals to reach 105 and pass Kessel's career 104 goals from 2003–05 for the NTDP lead.

Kessel graduated from Pioneer High School in 2005. However, because his birthday falls after September 15, he was not eligible for the NHL entry draft that year. After finishing his two years at NTDP, Kessel enrolled at University of Minnesota on a sports scholarship and played for the Golden Gophers men's ice hockey team for the 2005–06 season. His first collegiate goal came on a penalty shot, marking the first time in team history that a player scored his first career goal on a penalty shot. As a rookie freshman, Kessel finished second on the team in scoring with 51 points (18 goals and 33 assists) in 39 games, behind Ryan Potulny. He was named the 2005–06 WCHA Rookie of the Year and named to the 2005–06 All-Rookie Team.

Kessel was drafted fifth overall by the Boston Bruins in the 2006 NHL entry draft. He subsequently signed an entry-level contract with the team on August 17, 2006, thereby forgoing his final three years of college eligibility.

=== Professional ===
==== Boston Bruins (2006–2009) ====
On August 17, 2006, the Bruins announced that they had signed Kessel to a three-year, entry-level contract worth the rookie maximum of $850,000.

Kessel made his NHL debut on October 6, 2006, in an 8–3 loss to the Florida Panthers. On December 11, Kessel's family announced that he was hospitalized for a reason unrelated to hockey, and WBZ-TV reported that Kessel was diagnosed with a form of testicular cancer. On December 16, Kessel was pronounced cancer-free. On January 5, 2007, he was assigned to the Providence Bruins, Boston's American Hockey League (AHL) affiliate, for conditioning purposes and then recalled on January 7. Kessel returned to the Bruins lineup on January 9, against the Ottawa Senators, after missing only 11 regular season games following cancer surgery.

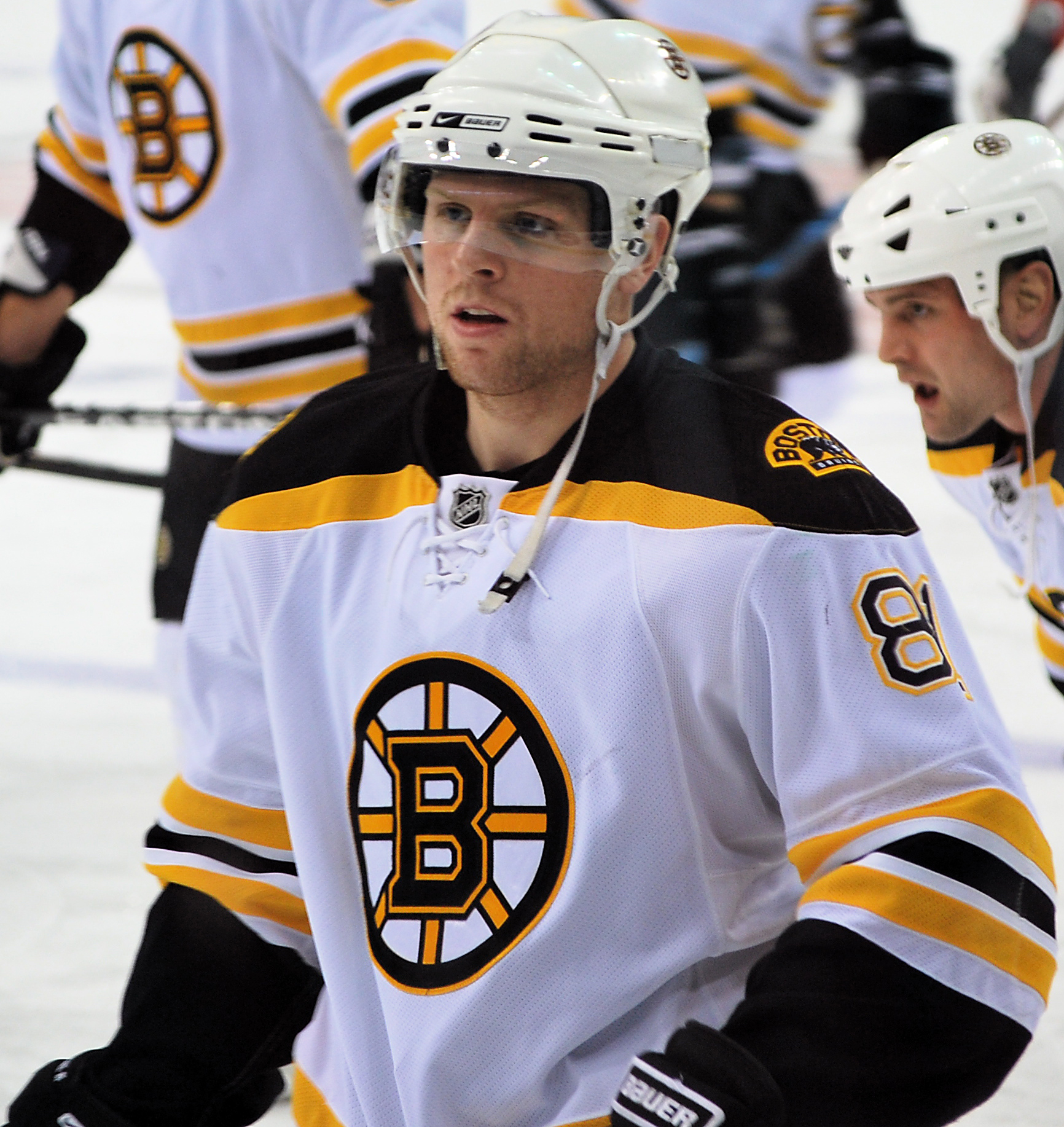
Kessel with the Boston Bruins in April 2008. He played with the Bruins from 2006 to 2009.

Kessel was named to the 2007 NHL YoungStars Game in Dallas on January 23, 2007. He recorded a hat-trick (including a powerplay goal, plus the game-winner) and an assist during a 9–8 Eastern Conference victory. While Kessel was not among top rookies in goals or assists, for the 2006–07 season he was second among rookies with four shootout goals (in seven attempts). Each was a game-deciding goal.

At the conclusion of the season, Kessel was voted by Boston sports writers as the team's candidate for the Bill Masterton Memorial Trophy after battling testicular cancer. At the 2007 NHL Awards Ceremony at the Elgin Theatre in Toronto, Kessel was officially selected as the recipient of the 2007 Masterton Trophy.

For the 2007–08 season Kessel led the league with 5 game-deciding shootout goals (out of 13 attempts in shootouts). He set a Bruins career record with 9 shootout-deciding goals, surpassed by Patrice Bergeron seven years later.

Kessel scored the first Bruins goal of the 2008–09 season, in a 5–4 Bruins victory against the Colorado Avalanche. Kessel ended the regular season on a high note, scoring his second career hat-trick in the April 12, 2009, 6–2 visitors' victory against the New York Islanders, and amassing the highest number of NHL regular season goals so far in his career with 36, the most on the Bruins that season. He also tied Ed Olczyk for longest point streak by an American-born NHL player (18 games, 14 goals and 14 assists for 28 points during streak) in late 2008. It is now the third-longest such point streak after Patrick Kane's 26-game streak in late 2015 and 20-game streak in the beginning of 2019.

Kessel played an integral role in Boston's run during the 2009 Stanley Cup playoffs, leading the Bruins with six goals before losing to the Carolina Hurricanes in the Eastern Conference Semifinals in seven games. After the playoffs, it was reported that Kessel needed off-season shoulder surgery to repair an injury most likely incurred during a 2–0 loss to the Columbus Blue Jackets on March 10. The surgery was successfully performed during the off-season, with recuperation forcing Kessel to miss the start of the 2009–10 season.

==== Toronto Maple Leafs (2009–2015) ====
On September 18, 2009, the Bruins traded Kessel to the Toronto Maple Leafs in exchange for a 2010 first-round pick (Tyler Seguin), a 2010 second-round pick (Jared Knight) and a 2011 first-round pick (Dougie Hamilton). Immediately afterward, the Leafs signed him to a five-year, $27 million contract.

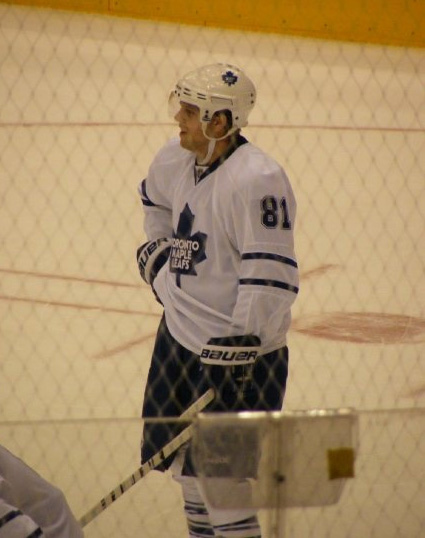
Kessel in December 2009, shortly after his debut game with the Toronto Maple Leafs.

Kessel, however, was sidelined for the first month of the season still with a shoulder injury incurred the year before that required surgery. Finally, on November 3, 2009, Kessel made his much-anticipated debut as a Leaf against the Tampa Bay Lightning. He had a total of ten shots on goal in the game, a career-high, though he did not record any assists or goals. Despite not recording any points and his team falling 2–1 to the Lightning in overtime, Kessel was named the third star of the game. He scored his first goal as a Maple Leaf four days later in a 5–1 win over the Detroit Red Wings at the Air Canada Centre. December 5, 2009, marked the first time that Kessel played against his former team, the Bruins, at TD Garden. His return to Boston was marked with thunderous taunting chants of his name by his former home crowd, along with a chorus of boos every time he had possession of the puck. Kessel was on the ice for the first three of the seven goals that Boston scored in their 7–2 victory, eventually finishing the game a −3 plus-minus with two shots on the night. After the game, Kessel said in a post-game interview on NESN that the fans' reaction "did not affect [him]." He did state, however, that it was the "worst game [he] had played in a while", and that he needed to "play better."

After the 2010 NHL Winter Classic between the Boston Bruins and Philadelphia Flyers on January 1, 2010, USA Hockey announced that Kessel, along with then-Maple Leaf teammate Mike Komisarek, made the Olympic roster to represent Team USA at the 2010 Winter Olympics. (Komisarek, however, missed the Olympics due to injury). In six games at the Olympics, Kessel tallied a goal and an assist as the U.S. won a silver medal, falling to Canada in the final.

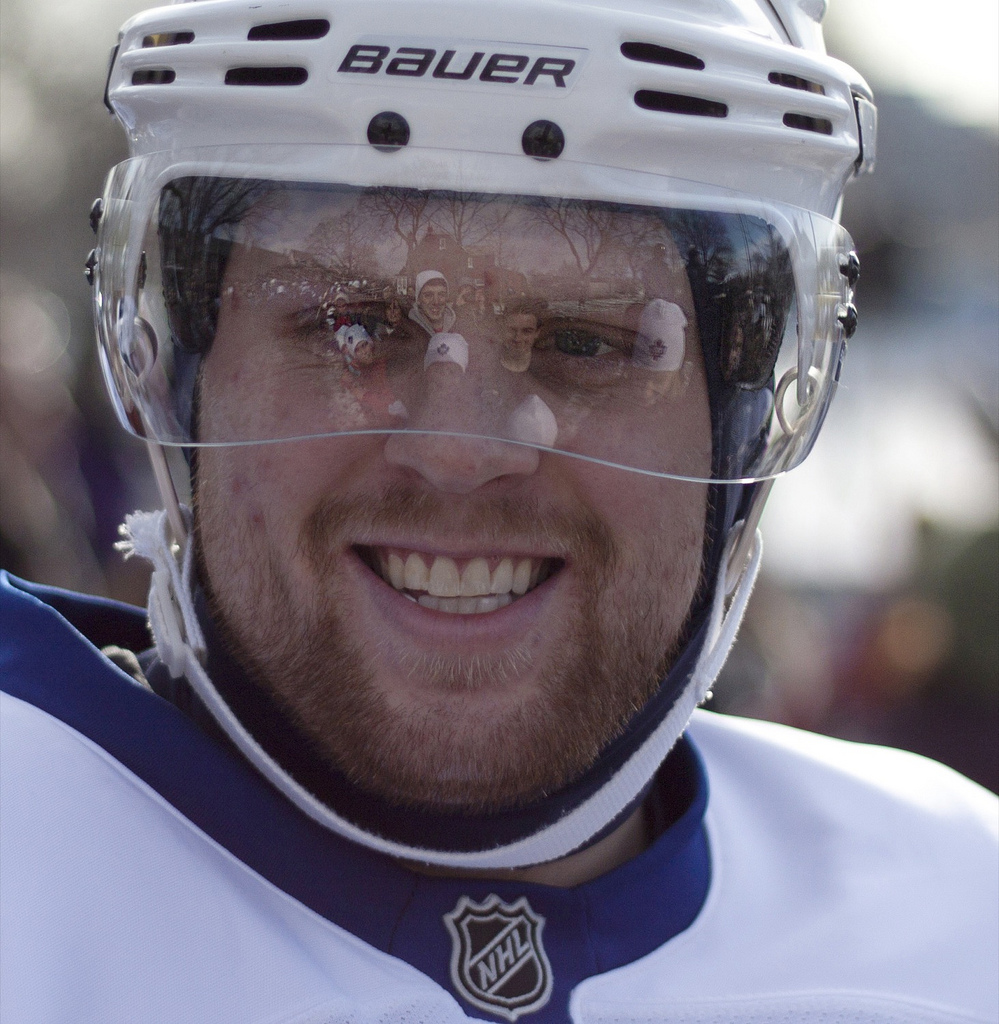
Kessel at a Maple Leafs practice held at an outdoor rink in Trinity Bellwoods Park in December 2010.

On April 2, 2011, Kessel posted his third consecutive 30-goal season, reaching the mark after scoring against the Ottawa Senators. At the time, he was among eight other NHL players, including League stars Sidney Crosby and Alexander Ovechkin, who have scored 30 goals or more in a season three times since the 2008–09 regular season.

Kessel had another strong start to a season in 2011–12, scoring his first hat-trick as a Maple Leaf (a career third) in just the team's second game of the season on October 8, 2011, against the Ottawa Senators. He finished the month as the NHL's top scorer and was subsequently named the NHL's First Star of the Month for October. That season, Kessel was once again named an NHL All-Star and was selected to Team Chara in the eighth round of the Fantasy Draft by Toronto linemate Joffrey Lupul.

On February 6, 2012, Kessel reached the 300-point plateau after a three-point performance against the Edmonton Oilers. The next day, he hit the 30-goal mark for the fourth-straight year (third-straight as a Maple Leaf) after beating Ondřej Pavelec of the Winnipeg Jets. Later that month, Kessel continued to reach milestones, scoring his 65th point of the season (which broke his old career-high) in a 2–1 loss to the San Jose Sharks.

An NHL player's poll conducted by Sports Illustrated and released in February 2012 named Kessel "the easiest (player) to intimidate" in the NHL. He was named by 15% of NHL player respondents while Vancouver Canucks' Daniel and Henrik Sedin were next with 8%. The results were based on the input of 145 NHL players who responded to Sports Illustrated's survey. The poll drew controversy from many, including then-Toronto General Manager Brian Burke due to the inflammatory nature of the question and which players were polled (i.e. no one in the Maple Leafs' or Canucks organizations agreed to have players complete the survey).

In another player survey, this one by The Hockey News, Kessel was ranked as the 16th best player in the League by his peers. The results in this survey were based on responses from five players from each of the 30 NHL teams. Players were not allowed to vote for members of their own team.

On March 31, 2012, Kessel scored his 37th goal of the season in a 4–3 win over the Buffalo Sabres, eclipsing his career-high of 36 set with Boston. He finished the season with 37 goals and 82 points, both new career-highs, and both placed him sixth in the NHL. After the season he was awarded the Molson Cup for the third straight year since becoming a Maple Leaf.

Kessel began the 2012–13 season with his longest goal drought to begin a season at ten games, finally breaking the slump after scoring the game-winning goal against Winnipeg on February 7, 2013. On April 20, 2013, in a 4–1 win against Ottawa in which Kessel recorded two assists, he and the Maple Leafs clinched a playoff spot in the 2013 Stanley Cup playoffs. This marked the first time Kessel had made it to the playoffs since his move to the Maple Leafs in 2009 and ended a seven-year playoff drought for the club dating back before the 2004–05 NHL lockout. To conclude the season, Kessel scored ten goals and seven assists for 17 points over his last ten games to retake the scoring lead for Toronto. Kessel eventually finished seventh in NHL scoring, posting his second consecutive point-per-game season.

On October 1, 2013, Kessel signed an eight-year, $64 million contract extension, which was the largest contract in Maple Leafs' franchise history at the time. During the 2013–14 campaign, in the week of October 21 and 27, Kessel scored in all three of Toronto's games. In the Maple Leafs' first game, he scored his fourth career hat-trick, including the game-winner, in a 4–2 victory of the Anaheim Ducks. He then scored in Toronto's next game, a 5–2 loss to the Columbus Blue Jackets, and concluded the week by recording a goal and an assist in a 4–1 victory over the Pittsburgh Penguins. For his efforts, Kessel was named Second Star of the Week after leading the NHL with five goals scored in that timeframe. Kessel continued his successful week with a two-goal, two-assist effort against Edmonton in a 4–0 Maple Leafs victory. After the 2014 NHL Winter Classic, in which Toronto defeated Detroit Red Wings 3–2 in a shootout, it was announced that Kessel, along with teammate James van Riemsdyk, had been named to Team USA's roster for participation in the 2014 Winter Olympics in Sochi. On February 1, 2014, Kessel scored his fifth career hat-trick against the Ottawa Senators, which was also his 30th goal of the season, marking the fifth time he has had scored at least 30 goals in one season in the NHL. On February 15, he scored another hat-trick, this time for Team USA against Slovenia during the 2014 Winter Olympics. He finished with five goals and three assists for eight points in six games to lead the tournament in scoring, was named to the tournament All-Star Team and earned Best Forward honors. Despite the personal success, however, Kessel and the U.S. lost the bronze medal game against Finland, falling 5–0. In the end of the 2014 NHL year he led Toronto in goals, assists and points for the third consecutive season.

Throughout the 2014–15 season Toronto slid down in the Eastern Conference standings: head coach Randy Carlyle was fired on January 15, 2015, after Toronto lost seven of their last ten games, and interim head coach Peter Horachek won just nine of the last 42 games of the season. Kessel's 61 points made him the team point leader.

==== Pittsburgh Penguins (2015–2019) ====
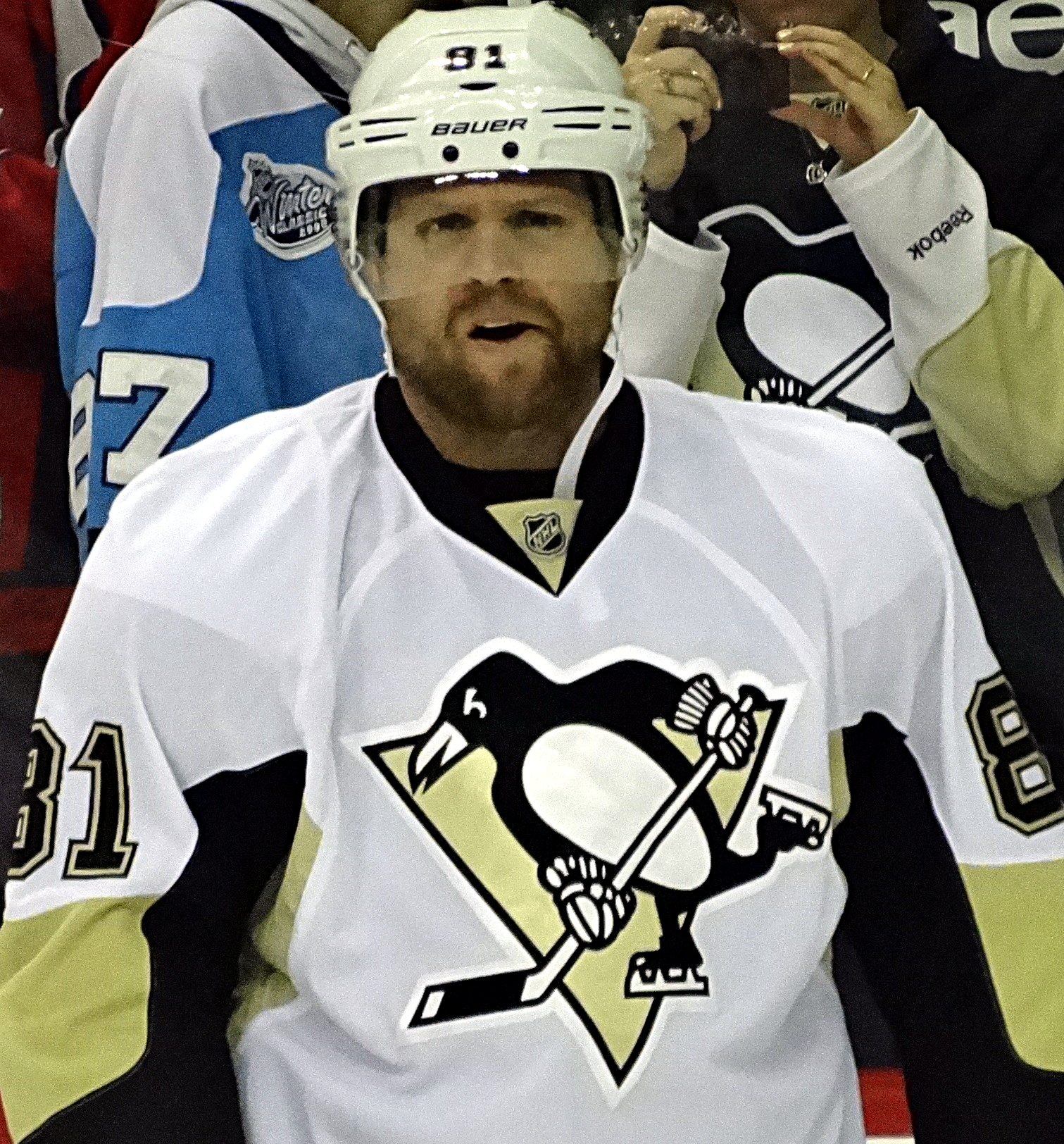
Kessel with the Pittsburgh Penguins in October 2015.

After weeks of trade rumors, on July 1, 2015, the Maple Leafs, who were entering a rebuilding phase, traded Kessel, Tyler Biggs, Tim Erixon, and a conditional second round draft pick to the Pittsburgh Penguins in a blockbuster deal for Kasperi Kapanen, Scott Harrington, Nick Spaling, and conditional first- (Sam Steel) and third-round (James Greenway) draft picks. Toronto also retained $1.2 million of Kessel's salary for the remaining seven seasons of his contract. Kessel scored his first regular season goal as a Penguin on October 10, while playing against the Arizona Coyotes in the team's second game of the 2015–16 season on October 10, 2015. On December 19, 2015, Kessel played his 500th consecutive game, becoming the 23rd player in league history to reach this milestone. On June 12, 2016, Kessel won the Stanley Cup after the Penguins defeated the San Jose Sharks in six games. Kessel played on a line with Nick Bonino and Carl Hagelin that was the most effective line for the Penguins in the playoffs (called the HBK line). Kessel led the Penguins in playoff scoring with 10 goals and 22 points and also led the team in shots with 98. Kessel narrowly missed winning the Conn Smythe Trophy as the playoff MVP, falling short of teammate and captain Sidney Crosby by three points. In the 5–3–1 point distribution scheme based on the ballots of 18 voters, Crosby had nine first-place votes, five second-place votes, and three third-place votes, while Kessel had seven first-place votes, eight second-place votes, and one third-place vote. As a member of the 2015–16 Stanley Cup winning team, Kessel was entitled to spend a day with the Stanley Cup. For his day with the cup, Kessel initially brought the cup to his hometown of Madison, Wisconsin, where he celebrated with family and friends. He then returned to Toronto, bringing the trophy to SickKids Hospital to share it with patients and their families.

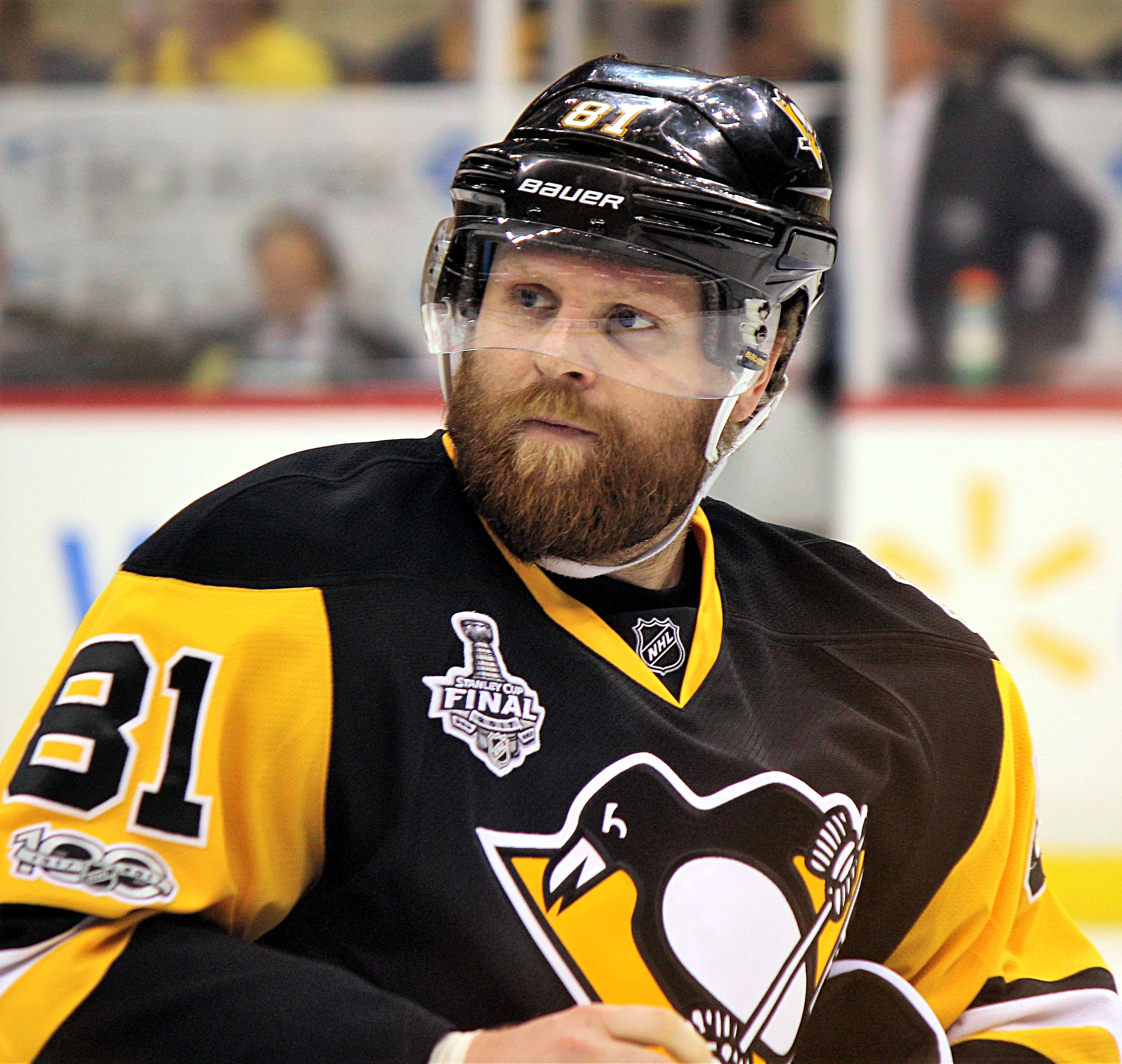
Kessel with the Pittsburgh Penguins in June 2017.

When Kessel won his second championship he took pictures of himself eating hot dogs out of the Stanley Cup.

In the 2017–18 season, he scored 92 points (34 goals, 58 assists), a career high, placed him eighth in the NHL. He also posted a new career-best 58 assists in the season.

On October 11, 2018, during the third Pittsburgh game of the 2018–19 season against the Vegas Golden Knights, Kessel scored his sixth career hat-trick, which occurred as his first natural, and first as a Penguin. From February 1 to March 5, 2019, Kessel did not score a goal in 16 games (however, he collected 11 assists), which was the longest goal-drought in his entire career. On March 19, 2019, Kessel played in his 320th consecutive game for the Penguins, passing Craig Adams for the longest in their history. After the last game of the regular season, Kessel was second in points for Penguins, and led the league with 10 game-winning goals. Kessel and the Penguins were swept by the New York Islanders in the first round of the 2019 playoffs in what would be Kessel's final postseason with the Penguins; he scored a goal to go with an assist in the four-game loss.

==== Arizona Coyotes (2019–2022) ====
On June 29, 2019, Kessel was traded from Pittsburgh to the Arizona Coyotes along with Dane Birks and a fourth-round pick, in exchange for Alex Galchenyuk and Pierre-Olivier Joseph. On October 12, 2019, Kessel played his 1,000th career NHL game against the Colorado Avalanche.

On May 7, 2021, Kessel scored his 900th point in the NHL, a breakaway goal against the San Jose Sharks.

Kessel was able to continue his iron man streak through the COVID-19 pandemic, and dressed for the first shift of a March 8, 2022 road game against the Detroit Red Wings before leaving to take a special chartered flight back to Arizona to be present for the birth of his first child. This extended his streak to 956 consecutive games. Kessel had initially intended to play the entire game before leaving, but was encouraged by coach André Tourigny to depart earlier. After being present for the birth of his daughter Kapri, he rejoined the Coyotes on the road less than 48 hours later for a March 10 game against his former team, the Maple Leafs, recording an assist in a 5–4 victory. Teammate Jakob Chychrun deemed the episode "a pretty cool gesture." Maple Leafs star forward Auston Matthews remarked "it's quite a maneuver that he pulled. Hats off to him." On April 2, 2022, Philadelphia Flyers head coach Mike Yeo scratched Keith Yandle from the lineup, ending his iron man streak at a record 989 straight games. Kessel took over as the player with the longest active streak.

==== Vegas Golden Knights (2022–2023) ====
On August 24, 2022, Kessel signed a one-year, $1.5 million contract with the Vegas Golden Knights. As his usual jersey number 81 was already in use on the team by Jonathan Marchessault, Kessel switched to wear number 8 for the first time in his NHL career. On October 24, 2022, Kessel played his 989th consecutive game in the NHL, tying Yandle's iron man streak. He appeared to have scored his 400th goal in that game as well, but it was called back on an offside challenge, though he did manage an assist. On the loss of his potential milestone goal, he remarked that "it is what it is. We scored right after, so it didn't matter." The next night against the San Jose Sharks, Kessel officially passed Yandle for the iron man record, skating in his 990th consecutive game, where he scored his 400th goal. On November 17, 2022, Kessel then became the first player in league history to record 1,000 consecutive games played, as the Golden Knights defeated the Arizona Coyotes, Kessel's former team, 4–1.

Kessel appeared in all of the Golden Knights' 82 regular season games, and started the team's first-round 2023 Stanley Cup playoffs series against the Winnipeg Jets. However, with his perceived on-ice effectiveness declining, coach Bruce Cassidy opted to scratch him for Game 5. This was the first game Kessel had missed since October 31, 2009 while playing for the Maple Leafs, counting both the regular season and postseason, though his official iron man streak was unaffected as it only counted the regular season. Kessel had not missed a playoff game since April 15, 2008, during his tenure with the Bruins. His unofficial streak of consecutive games played through the combined regular season and the playoffs totaled 1,149 games. Coach Cassidy praised Kessel as "a terrific teammate for our guys" during the Golden Knights' deep run in the 2023 Stanley Cup playoffs, in which he was cited as a contributor to the team's morale. Despite not appearing in any playoff games past the first round, Kessel ultimately won his third Stanley Cup, as Vegas defeated the Florida Panthers in the 2023 Stanley Cup Final in five games.

Vegas chose not to re-sign Kessel, and he began the 2023-24 season as a free-agent. Although there was some media buzz of Kessel securing a belated contract with the Vancouver Canucks, Kessel did not play the entire season.

Despite reportedly showing interest in playing and reaching out to teams, Kessel again did not sign with a team for the entirety of the 2024–25 season.

== International play ==
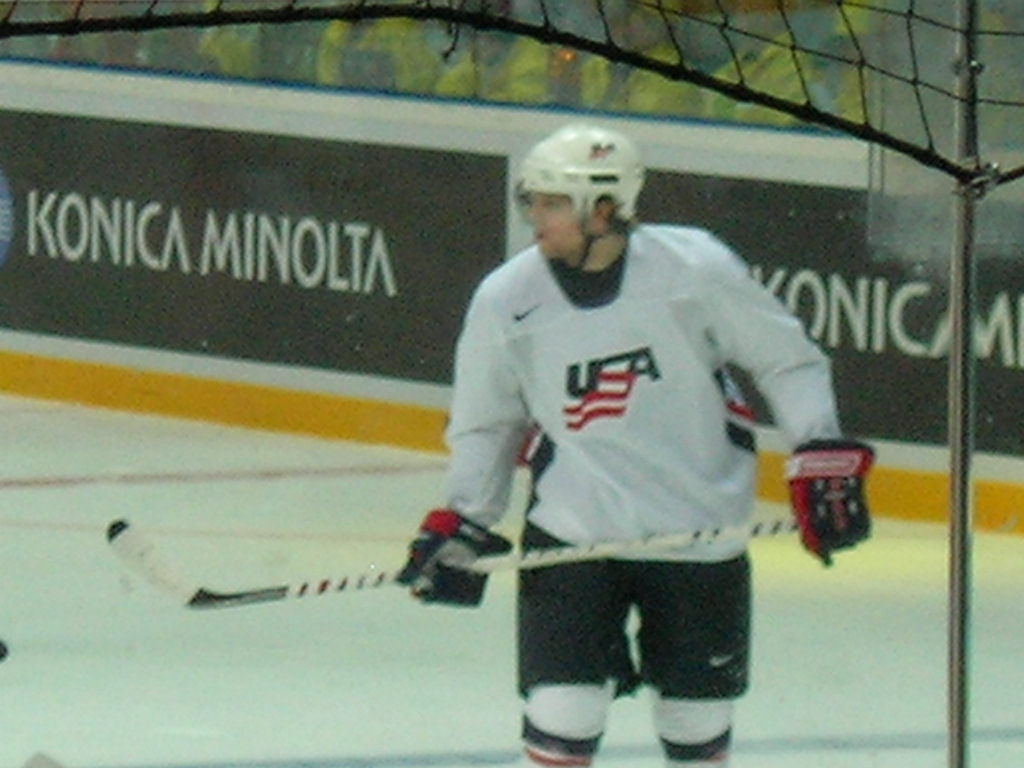
- Kessel with the United States national team at the 2007 World Championship.

Medal record

Representing United States

Ice hockey

Olympic Games
Silver medal – second place	2010 Vancouver	

IIHF World U18 Championship
Silver medal – second place	2004 Minsk	
Gold medal – first place	2005 Plzeň	

=== Junior ===
Kessel represented the United States in international competition for the first time when his under-17 National Team Development Program squad played at the 2004 World U17 Hockey Challenge finishing fourth. He finished the tournament fourth overall in points (10) and second overall in goals (6).

Later in 2004, Kessel played as an underaged player at the IIHF World U18 Championship, where the U.S. won silver. He finished with ten points (seven goals and three assists) in six games, leading the tournament in goals and being named to the tournament all-star team.

During Kessel's 2004–05 campaign with the NTDP, he played for Team USA at the World Junior Championship held in Grand Forks, North Dakota, where the team ultimately finished fourth. He had four goals and two assists in seven games.

In 2005, Kessel once again participated in the World U18 Championship, this time winning a gold medal. He finished with nine goals and seven assists for 16 points in six games, leading the tournament in all said offensive statistics. Kessel was named the tournament's best forward and was also named to the tournament All-Star Team.

Kessel then played in the 2006 World Junior Championship, where the U.S. finished fourth for the second-straight year. Kessel led the tournament in points (11) and assists (10).

=== Senior ===
Kessel made his debut in senior international competition in 2006, when he competed at the 2006 IIHF World Championship in Riga. In seven games, he scored one goal and one assist as the U.S. placed seventh.

Following his rookie year with Boston, Kessel competed at the 2007 IIHF World Championship in Moscow, where the U.S. finished fifth. He improved on his performance at the previous World Championship, scoring two goals and five assists in seven games.

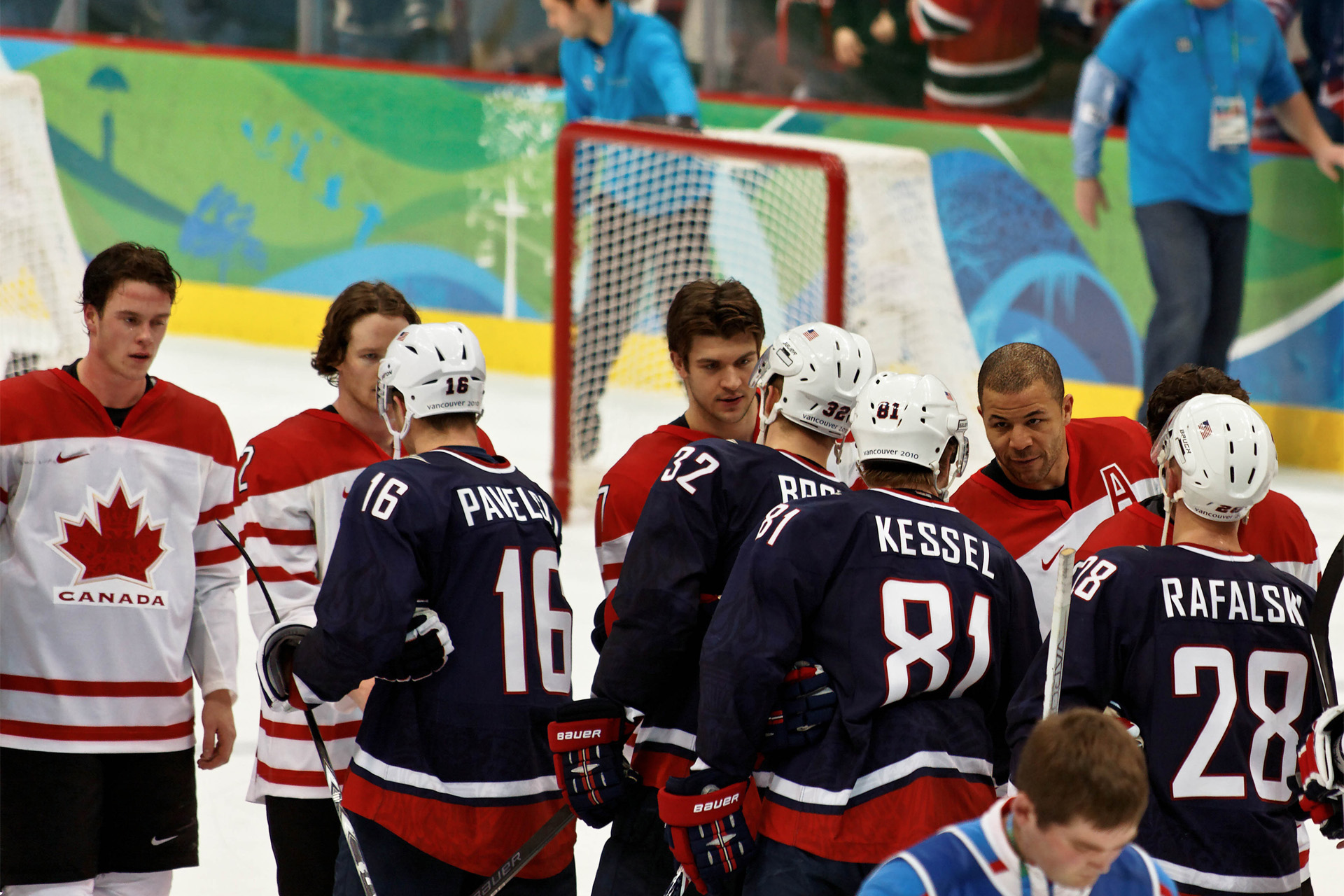
Kessel with the United States men's national hockey team at the 2010 Winter Olympics. The U.S. team won silver in the Olympic tournament.

Kessel competed at the World Championship for the third time in the 2008 edition held in Halifax, Nova Scotia, and Quebec City. Again, however, the U.S. underwhelmed, finishing in sixth place. On a personal level, Kessel finished ninth overall in points with ten (six goals and four assists) in seven games.

In 2010, Kessel played for Team USA at the Winter Olympics in Vancouver. The U.S. finished second, winning the silver medal. In six games, Kessel had a goal and an assist.

On January 1, 2014, after the completion of the 2014 Winter Classic, Kessel was announced as a member of the 2014 Olympic Team and went on to compete at the Winter Olympics in Sochi, Russia. Although the US finished out of the medals, Kessel enjoyed individual success, scoring 5 goals and 3 assists in 6 games, leading the tournament in points (8), being named as best forward, and being named to the All-Star Team.

Despite his successful Stanley Cup winning campaign with the Pittsburgh Penguins where he scored 10 goals and 22 points in the playoffs, he was left off the American roster of the 2016 World Cup of Hockey. Following the elimination of Team USA after a 4–2 loss to Team Canada, Kessel tweeted "Just sitting around the house tonight w my dog. Felt like I should be doing something important, but couldn't put my finger on it." This was interpreted by several Team USA players and personnel, including Dean Lombardi, John Tortorella, David Backes, Zach Parise, and Derek Stepan as Kessel jabbing following his snub. Kessel stated that his comments were not directed at anyone, and that he didn't mean any disrespect towards anyone.

== Personal life ==
Kessel is from Verona, Wisconsin. The entire Kessel family features successful athletes. His father, Phil Kessel Sr., a college quarterback at Northern Michigan University, was drafted in 1981 by the Washington Redskins of the National Football League (NFL), spending his first year on the injured reserve and then subsequently being released. He spent the 1982 CFL season with the Calgary Stampeders. Kessel's brother Blake, a defenseman, was drafted by the New York Islanders in the sixth round of the 2007 NHL entry draft and last played for the Orlando Solar Bears of the ECHL. Kessel's sister Amanda is also a professional ice hockey player and internationally represented the United States with whom she won gold during the 2018 Winter Olympics. Kessel's cousin, David Moss, played in the NHL with the Calgary Flames and Phoenix/Arizona Coyotes.

An avid poker player in his free time, Kessel often plays high stakes tournaments, casino cash games and home games with his teammates. Although able to play Texas hold 'em well, he prefers to play Pot-limit Omaha, a game he was taught by his father. Kessel has played in the World Series of Poker (WSOP) every year since 2012, entering high stakes tournaments with entry fees as high as $25,000. As of June 2019, Kessel has totaled $17,022 in live tournament winnings, stemming from cashing in six different WSOP tournaments. Kessel is also good friends with professional poker player Daniel Negreanu, who himself has nearly $40 million in live poker tournament winnings.

Kessel and his girlfriend have one daughter.

=== Lifestyle ===
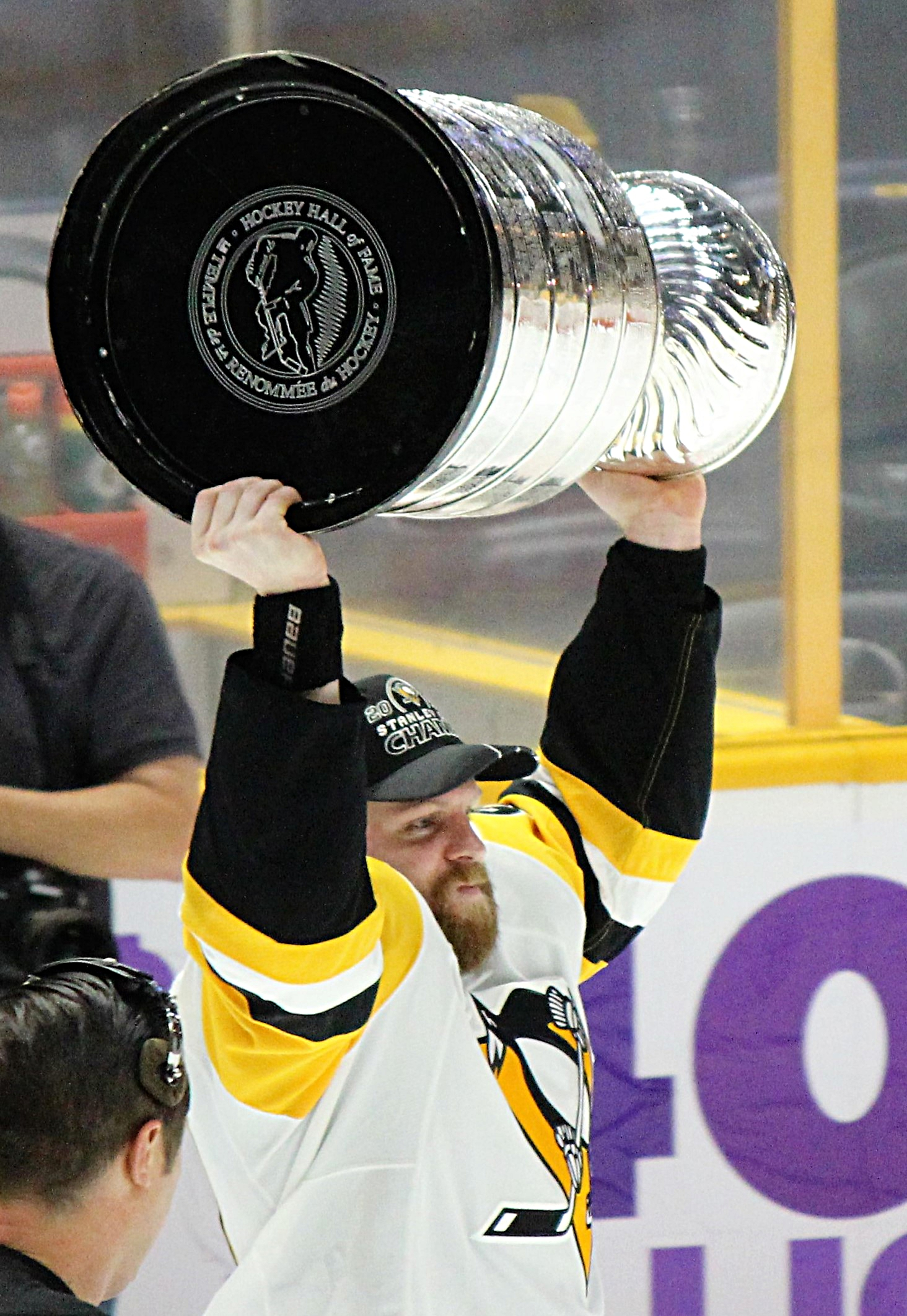
Kessel holding the Stanley Cup after winning the 2017 Stanley Cup Final with the Penguins.

Kessel is well known for his unorthodox diet, which is atypical for a professional athlete. Kessel does not drink water, owing to his dislike of the taste of it, instead opting exclusively for soft drinks and sports drinks. He often drank Coca-Cola between periods, and once threatened to retire when the Maple Leafs hired Randy Carlyle as head coach, as Carlyle had historically removed soft drinks from team locker rooms. Kessel has a preference for junk food and often indulges in processed foods and snacks such as Sour Patch Kids and candies, in contrast to other hockey players, who generally follow strict diet regimens. Kessel's pre-game meal was a bowl of cheddar cheese, and while in Toronto, Kessel was reported to eat a hot dog every afternoon from a street vendor, although the hot dog claim is disputed. Kessel's alleged hot dog routine became a leading topic of hockey humour for the second half of his playing career, and Kessel himself poked fun at the story by posing with the Stanley Cup filled with hot dogs following his second championship in 2017, captioned, "hot dogs taste better out of the Stanley Cup!", and eating a hot dog-themed cake for his birthday in 2022.

Several NHL players have commented on Kessel's unorthodox eating habits, including Blake Wheeler, John-Michael Liles, Morgan Rielly, Blake Coleman, and Kris Versteeg, the latter of whom referred to Kessel's diet as "brutal", although many players have been impressed that Kessel could play at an elite level despite having a relatively unfavourable diet.

== Career statistics ==
=== Regular season and playoffs ===
			Regular season					Playoffs
Season	Team	League	GP	G	A	Pts	PIM	GP	G	A	Pts	PIM
2001–02	Madison Capitols	Bantam	86	176	110	286	—	—	—	—	—	—
2002–03	Madison Capitols	Midget	71	113	45	158	26	—	—	—	—	—
2003–04	U.S. NTDP U17	USDP	32	31	18	49	8	—	—	—	—	—
2003–04	U.S. NTDP U18	NAHL	30	21	12	33	18	—	—	—	—	—
2004–05	U.S. NTDP U18	USDP	41	41	32	73	16	—	—	—	—	—
2004–05	U.S. NTDP Juniors	NAHL	14	11	14	25	21	—	—	—	—	—
2005–06	University of Minnesota	WCHA	39	18	33	51	28	—	—	—	—	—
2006–07	Boston Bruins	NHL	70	11	18	29	12	—	—	—	—	—
2006–07	Providence Bruins	AHL	2	1	0	1	2	—	—	—	—	—
2007–08	Boston Bruins	NHL	82	19	18	37	28	4	3	1	4	2
2008–09	Boston Bruins	NHL	70	36	24	60	16	11	6	5	11	4
2009–10	Toronto Maple Leafs	NHL	70	30	25	55	21	—	—	—	—	—
2010–11	Toronto Maple Leafs	NHL	82	32	32	64	24	—	—	—	—	—
2011–12	Toronto Maple Leafs	NHL	82	37	45	82	20	—	—	—	—	—
2012–13	Toronto Maple Leafs	NHL	48	20	32	52	18	7	4	2	6	2
2013–14	Toronto Maple Leafs	NHL	82	37	43	80	27	—	—	—	—	—
2014–15	Toronto Maple Leafs	NHL	82	25	36	61	30	—	—	—	—	—
2015–16	Pittsburgh Penguins	NHL	82	26	33	59	18	24	10	12	22	4
2016–17	Pittsburgh Penguins	NHL	82	23	47	70	20	25	8	15	23	2
2017–18	Pittsburgh Penguins	NHL	82	34	58	92	36	12	1	8	9	2
2018–19	Pittsburgh Penguins	NHL	82	27	55	82	28	4	1	1	2	2
2019–20	Arizona Coyotes	NHL	70	14	24	38	22	9	1	3	4	4
2020–21	Arizona Coyotes	NHL	56	20	23	43	12	—	—	—	—	—
2021–22	Arizona Coyotes	NHL	82	8	44	52	40	—	—	—	—	—
2022–23	Vegas Golden Knights	NHL	82	14	22	36	30	4	0	2	2	2
NHL totals			1,286	413	579	992	402	100	34	49	83	24

=== International ===
Year	Team	Event	Result	GP	G	A	Pts	PIM
2004	United States	U17	4th	5	6	4	10	0
2004	United States	WJC18	2nd place, silver medalist(s)	6	7	3	10	6
2005	United States	WJC	4th	7	4	2	6	2
2005	United States	WJC18	1st place, gold medalist(s)	6	9	7	16	2
2006	United States	WJC	4th	7	1	10	11	2
2006	United States	WC	7th	7	1	1	2	2
2007	United States	WC	5th	7	2	5	7	6
2008	United States	WC	6th	7	6	4	10	6
2010	United States	OLY	2nd place, silver medalist(s)	6	1	1	2	0
2014	United States	OLY	4th	6	5	3	8	2
Junior totals			26	21	22	43	12
Senior totals			33	15	14	29	16

=== NHL All-Star Games ===
Year	Location	G	A	Pts
2011	Raleigh	0	0	0
2012	Ottawa	1	2	3
2015	Columbus	0	0	0
All-Star totals		1	2	3

== Awards and honors ==
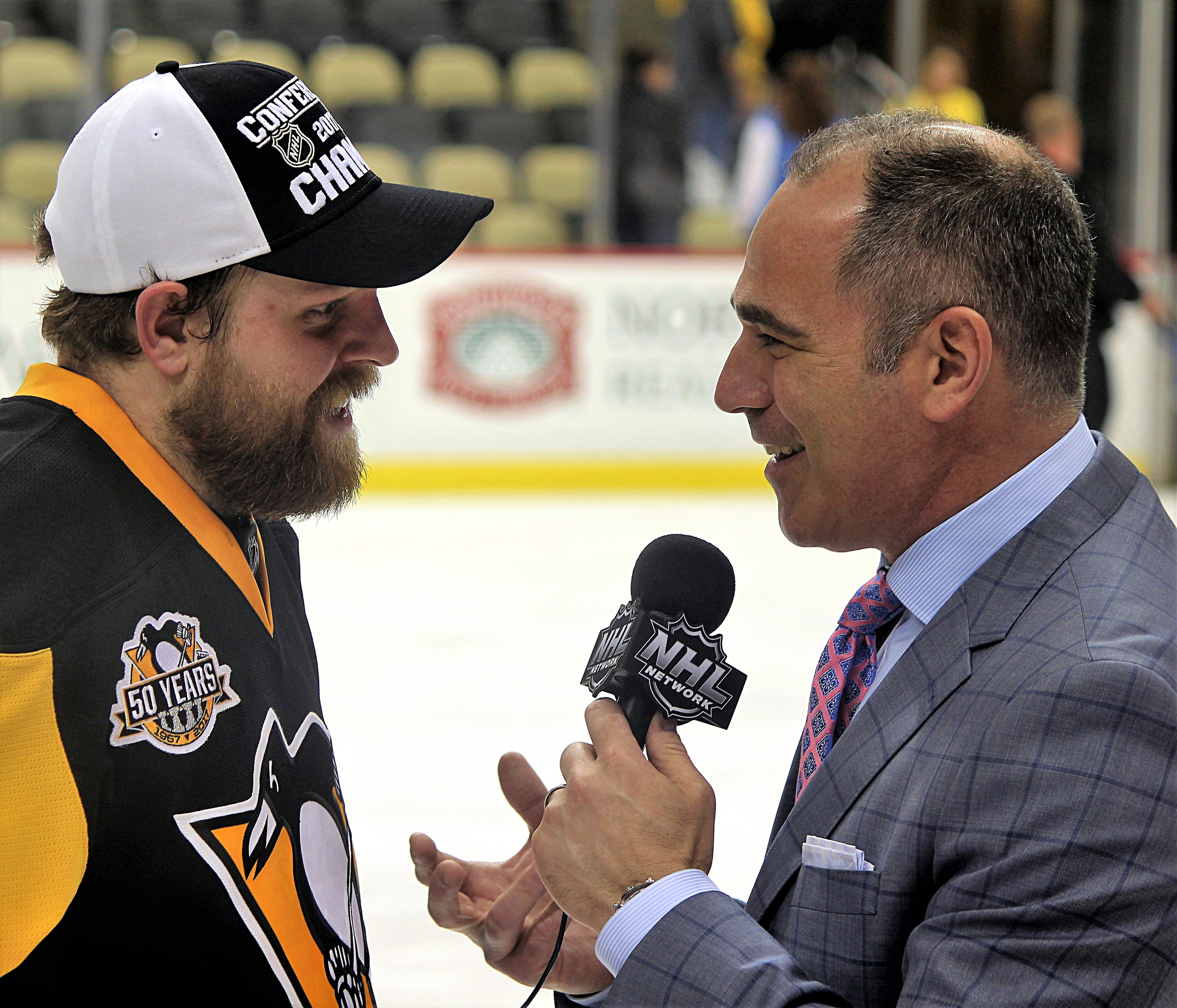
Kessel being interviewed by Billy Jaffe shortly after winning the 2017 Eastern Conference Finals with the Pittsburgh Penguins.

Awards	Year	Ref
College
WCHA Rookie of the Year	2006	
All-WCHA Rookie Team	2006	
MacNaughton Cup	2006	
NHL
NHL YoungStars Game	2007	
Bill Masterton Memorial Trophy	2007	
All-Star Game	2011, 2012, 2015	
Stanley Cup champion	2016, 2017, 2023	
International
Bob Johnson Award	2005	
Olympic All-Star Team	2014	
Olympic Best Forward	2014	
Boston Bruins
Eddie Shore Award	2008	
Named One of Top 100 Best Bruins Players of all Time	2024	
Toronto Maple Leafs
Molson Cup	2010, 2011, 2012	

== Records ==
=== NHL ===
- First NHL rookie awarded the Bill Masterton Memorial Trophy
- Most consecutive games played: 1,064 (active)
- First player in NHL history to record 1,000 consecutive games played
- Most consecutive games played including playoffs: 1,149 (unofficial)

=== Pittsburgh Penguins ===
- Most consecutive games played: 328

== NHL milestones ==
- Played first game on October 6, 2006, against Florida
- Recorded first point (an assist on a Brad Boyes goal) on October 7, 2006, against Tampa Bay
- Scored first goal on October 21, 2006, against Buffalo
- Scored first hat-trick on October 12, 2007, against Los Angeles
- Scored first overtime goal on March 11, 2010, against Tampa Bay
- Scored first shorthanded goal on November 26, 2010, against Buffalo
- Scored first goal on a penalty shot on January 7, 2012, against Detroit (vs. Jimmy Howard)
- Recorded career-high 4 assists and 5 points in a game on March 26, 2016, against Detroit
- Recorded 3,000th shot on goal in a game on March 1, 2018, against Boston
- Scored first natural hat-trick on October 11, 2018, against Vegas
- Scored 10th overtime goal on January 18, 2019, against Arizona
- Scored 100th power play goal on March 12, 2019, against Washington
- Recorded 300th power play point on February 2, 2021, against St. Louis
- Recorded 500th assist on March 20, 2021, against Anaheim
- Recorded 900th point on May 7, 2021, against San Jose
- Scored 70th game-winning goal on May 8, 2021, against San Jose
- Played in 1,200th game on April 22, 2022, against Washington
- Played in 990th straight regular-season game (NHL-record) and scored 400th goal on October 25, 2022, against San Jose
- Played in 1000th straight regular-season game on November 17, 2022, against Arizona
- Registered 400th penalty minute on March 25, 2023, against Edmonton
- Played in 100th playoff game on April 24, 2023, against Winnipeg

== See also ==
- List of NHL players with 500 consecutive games played
- List of NHL players with 1,000 games played

Awards and achievements
Preceded by Paul Stastny	WCHA Rookie of the Year; 2005–06	Succeeded by Andreas Nödl
Preceded by Teemu Selänne	Winner of the Bill Masterton Memorial Trophy; 2006–07	Succeeded by Jason Blake
Sporting positions
Preceded by Matt Lashoff	Boston Bruins first-round draft pick 2006	Succeeded by Zach Hamill
