= 2005–06 NAHL season =

- League: North American Hockey League
- Sport: Ice hockey
- Duration: Regular season September 9, 2005 – March 26, 2006; Postseason; March 30 – May 13, 2006
- Games: 58
- Teams: 20

Regular season
- Season champions: Bozeman IceDogs
- Season MVP: Matt Dalton (Bozeman IceDogs)
- Top scorer: Josh Heidinger (Bozeman IceDogs)

Robertson Cup Playoffs
- Finals champions: Texas Tornado
- Runners-up: Bozeman IceDogs

NAHL seasons
- ← 2004–05 2006–07 →

The 2005–06 NAHL season was the 22nd season of the North American Hockey League. The regular season ran from September 2005 to April 2006 with a 58-game schedule for each team. The Bozeman IceDogs won the regular season championship and went on be defeated by the Texas Tornado 4 to 2 for the Robertson Cup.

== Member changes ==
- The Soo Indians and Central Texas Marshals both folded.
- The NAHL replaced those two franchises with the Southern Minnesota Express, North Iowa Outlaws and Traverse City North Stars.
- The Springfield Spirit relocated and became the Wasilla Spirit.
- The Toledo IceDiggers relocated and became the Alpena IceDiggers.
- Due to the founding of the Youngstown SteelHounds, the Youngstown Phantoms rebranded as the Mahoning Valley Phantoms.

== Regular season ==
The standings at the end of the regular season were as follows:

Note: x = clinched playoff berth; y = clinched division title; z = clinched regular season title

=== Standings ===
==== Central Division ====
Team	GP	W	L	OTL	Pts	GF	GA
xy – Southern Minnesota Express	58	35	17	6	76	233	175
x – Fargo-Moorhead Jets	58	34	21	3	71	209	147
x – Bismarck Bobcats	58	31	23	4	66	204	184
x – Minnesota Blizzard	58	24	29	3	53	149	219
North Iowa Outlaws	58	18	37	3	39	149	219

==== North Division ====
Team	GP	W	L	OTL	Pts	GF	GA
xy – USNTDP	58	39	14	5	83	254	147
x – Cleveland Jr. Barons	58	35	19	4	74	197	150
x – Mahoning Valley Phantoms	58	34	20	4	72	214	181
x – Traverse City North Stars	58	17	34	7	41	162	258
Alpena IceDiggers	58	13	38	7	33	147	260

==== South Division ====
Team	GP	W	L	OTL	Pts	GF	GA
xy – Texas Tornado	58	42	12	4	88	201	132
x – Texarkana Bandits	58	42	14	2	86	240	145
x – Springfield Jr. Blues	58	28	26	4	60	181	208
x – Wichita Falls Wildcats	58	26	28	4	56	171	189
Santa Fe RoadRunners	58	24	28	6	54	182	205

==== West Division ====
Team	GP	W	L	OTL	Pts	GF	GA
xyz – Bozeman IceDogs	58	48	9	1	97	235	117
x – Fairbanks Ice Dogs	58	30	18	10	70	173	175
x – Billings Bulls	58	20	30	8	48	167	252
x – Wasilla Spirit	58	23	33	2	48	133	187
Helena Bighorns	58	17	35	6	40	186	246

=== Statistics ===
==== Scoring leaders ====
The following players led the league in regular season points at the completion of all regular season games.

Player	Team	GP	G	A	Pts	PIM
Josh Heidinger	Bozeman Icedogs	53	32	56	88	47
Carter Camper	Cleveland Jr. Barons	57	30	51	81	26
Marc Menzione	Mahoning Valley Phantoms	58	29	46	75	62
Eric Kattelus	Bismarck Bobcats	50	35	40	75	38
Karl Sellan	Texas Tornado	58	38	36	74	116
Anthony Ciraulo	Mahoning Valley Phantoms	56	25	48	73	150
Casey Haines	Texarkana Bandits	58	29	44	73	75
Anthony Becker	Texarkana Bandits	56	27	44	71	66
Corey Stark	Santa Fe Roadrunners	58	37	33	70	24
Jacques Lamoureux	Bismarck Bobcats	54	32	38	70	103

==== Leading goaltenders ====
Note: GP = Games played; Mins = Minutes played; W = Wins; L = Losses; OTL = Overtime losses; SOL = Shootout losses; SO = Shutouts; GAA = Goals against average; SV% = Save percentage

Player	Team	GP	Mins	W	L	OTL	SOL	GA	SO	SV	SV%	GAA
Matt Dalton	Bozeman Icedogs	39	2314:33	33	5	0	1	63	9	1,044	.940	1.63
Troy Redmann	Texas Tornado	49	2924:30	33	11	1	3	100	2	1,178	.915	2.05
B. J. O'Brien	Fargo-Moorhead Jets	46	2666:00	27	14	0	3	96	6	1,279	.925	2.16
Riley Gill	Texarkana Bandits	44	2645:13	34	9	0	1	96	6	1,429	.933	2.18
Kenny Reiter	Cleveland Jr. Barons	30	1735:37	16	9	1	3	69	3	824	.916	2.39

== Robertson Cup playoffs ==
Five teams qualified for the Round Robin semifinal, the host (Mahoning Valley) and the four division champions. If Mahoning Valley won the North division final, the runner-up would receive the final qualifying spot. For the round robin semifinal, ties were broken first by head-to-head matchup and then by goal differential.

Division Semifinals (Best-of-5)
C1	Southern Minnesota Express	3*	0	5	6	6
C4	Minnesota Blizzard	2	3	1	7*	3
Central Division
C2	Fargo-Moorhead Jets	3	4	1	3	-
C3	Bismarck Bobcats	2	2	2	1	-
N1	USNTDP	1	4	3	2	1
N4	Traverse City North Stars	2	2	4*	0	0
North Division
N2	Cleveland Jr. Barons	1	5	3	5	5
N3	Mahoning Valley Phantoms	2	4	2	6*	2
S1	Texas Tornado	6	1	0	4	4
S4	Wichita Falls Wildcats	1	2	3	2	0
South Division
S2	Texarkana Bandits	2	5	3	3	-
S3	Springfield Jr. Blues	5	2	0	2	-
W1	Bozeman IceDogs	5	4	5	-	-
W3	Billings Bulls	1	0	3	-	-
West Division
W2	Fairbanks Ice Dogs	1	2*	3*	0	4
W4	Wasilla Spirit	2*	1	2	4	1

Division Finals (Best-of-5)
C1	Southern Minnesota Express	4	6	2*	4*	-	-	-
C2	Fargo-Moorhead Jets	2	0	1	3	-	-	-
N1	USNTDP	3*	1	3	4*	2	1	2
N2	Cleveland Jr. Barons	2	2	2	3	4	2*	3
S1	Texas Tornado	6*	8	3*	2	-	-	-
S2	Texarkana Bandits	5	0	2	0	-	-	-
W1	Bozeman IceDogs	1	4	7	6	2	-	-
W2	Fairbanks Ice Dogs	2	2	2	1	1	-	-

Semifinal (Round Robin)
C1	Southern Minnesota Express	-	3	5
N2	Cleveland Jr. Barons	-	3	1
S1	Texas Tornado	4	5	-
W1	Bozeman IceDogs	2	-	3
H	Mahoning Valley Phantoms	2	0	-

Championship (Best-of-1)
S1	Texas Tornado	4
W1	Bozeman IceDogs	2
Third Place Game
C2	Southern Minnesota Express	6
H	Mahoning Valley Phantoms	2

Note: * denotes overtime period(s)
Note: Southern Minnesota and Texas played twice in the Round-Robin. The Express won the first game 7–3 while Texas won the second, 4–3.
