= Tony Curtale =

American ice hockey player (born 1962)

- Born: January 29, 1962 (age 64) Detroit, Michigan, U.S.
- Height: 6 ft 1 in (185 cm)
- Weight: 195 lb (88 kg; 13 st 13 lb)
- Position: Defense
- Shot: Left
- Played for: Calgary Flames
- NHL draft: 31st overall, 1980; Calgary Flames
- Playing career: 1980–1987

Anthony Glenn Curtale (born January 29, 1962) is an American former professional ice hockey player and was most recently the head coach of the Wichita Falls Wildcats in the North American Hockey League. He was drafted by the Calgary Flames in the second round, 31st overall in the 1980 NHL entry draft.

Curtale played only two games in his National Hockey League career, for the Flames in 1980–81 as a late-season call-up from his junior hockey club, the Brantford Alexanders. He would spend the rest of his playing career in the minors, playing for the Colorado Flames for two seasons, before joining the Peoria Rivermen until his retirement in 1987.

After his playing career, Curtale later served as the head coach of the Springfield Jr. Blues in the North American Hockey League (NAHL) from 1995 to 1997 and then the Windsor Spitfires of the Ontario Hockey League (OHL) from 1997 to 1999. He returned to the NAHL with the Texas Tornado from 1999 until 2007 and led the team to a long string of success with four Robertson Cup Championships. He returned to the Tornado after coaching in the youth leagues in 2011 and led the team to a fifth league championship. When he left again in 2013, he was the winningest head coach in NAHL history. In 2016, he was hired by the NAHL's Wichita Falls Wildcats as head coach, however, he was indefinitely suspended by the team that November. The Wildcats released him on December 1.

== Career statistics ==
			Regular season					Playoffs
Season	Team	League	GP	G	A	Pts	PIM	GP	G	A	Pts	PIM
1978–79	St. Clair Falcons	MNHL	63	42	63	105	150	—	—	—	—	—
1979–80	Brantford Alexanders	OMJHL	59	10	35	45	227	5	0	4	4	4
1980–81	Brantford Alexanders	OHL	59	14	71	85	141	6	1	4	5	26
1980–81	Calgary Flames	NHL	2	0	0	0	0	—	—	—	—	—
1981–82	Brantford Alexanders	OHL	36	17	32	49	118	8	1	2	3	35
1981–82	Oklahoma City Stars	CHL	—	—	—	—	—	4	0	2	2	8
1982–83	Colorado Flames	CHL	74	7	22	29	61	5	1	0	1	6
1983–84	Peoria Prancers	IHL	2	0	0	0	2	—	—	—	—	—
1983–84	Colorado Flames	CHL	54	3	20	23	80	6	0	4	4	2
1984–85	Peoria Rivermen	IHL	50	5	31	36	81	17	1	7	8	43
1985–86	Peoria Rivermen	IHL	70	7	51	58	116	11	1	3	4	57
1986–87	Peoria Rivermen	IHL	72	8	21	29	126	—	—	—	—	—
NHL totals			2	0	0	0	0	—	—	—	—	—
CHL totals			128	10	42	52	141	15	1	6	7	16
IHL totals			194	20	103	123	325	28	2	10	12	100
