= Dayton Gems (disambiguation) =

Dayton Gems may refer to:

- Dayton Gems (1964–1980), defunct professional ice hockey team which played in the International Hockey League
- Dayton Gems (2009–2012), defunct professional ice hockey team which played in the International Hockey League and the Central Hockey League
- Dayton Gems (NAHL) (2003), defunct junior ice hockey team which played in the North American Hockey League
- Dayton Gems (junior), ice hockey team which played in the Continental Elite Hockey League
- Dayton Gems (soccer), soccer team which played in the USL Premier Development League
