= 2006–07 NAHL season =

- League: North American Hockey League
- Sport: Ice hockey
- Duration: Regular season September 13, 2006 – April 1, 2007; Postseason; April 5 – May 6, 2007
- Games: 62
- Teams: 17

Regular season
- Season champions: Mahoning Valley Phantoms
- Season MVP: Patrick Maroon (St. Louis Bandits)
- Top scorer: Patrick Maroon (St. Louis Bandits)

Robertson Cup Playoffs
- Finals champions: St. Louis Bandits
- Runners-up: Mahoning Valley Phantoms

NAHL seasons
- ← 2005–06 2007–08 →

The 2006–07 NAHL season was the 23rd season of the North American Hockey League. The regular season ran from September 2006 to April 2007 with a 62-game schedule for each team. The Mahoning Valley Phantoms won the regular season championship and went on be defeated by the St. Louis Bandits 8 to 4 for the Robertson Cup.

== Member changes ==
- During the season, the NAHL approved the addition of the Marquette Rangers as an expansion team beginning with this season.
- On May 3, 2006, the United States Hockey League approved the addition of a Columbus-area expansion team for this season. The ownership group transferred their NAHL franchise, the Cleveland Jr. Barons, in its entirety and rebranded it as the Ohio Junior Blue Jackets.
- Later in May, the Billings Bulls, Bozeman Icedogs and Helena Bighorns all left the NAHL to join the Northern Pacific Hockey League.
- During the summer, the Minnesota Blizzard rebranded as the Alexandria Blizzard. Additionally, the Wasilla Spirit changed their name to the Alaska Avalanche.
- Around the same time, the Texarkana Bandits relocated to St. Louis. The franchise retained its nickname.

== Regular season ==
The standings at the end of the regular season were as follows:

Note: x = clinched playoff berth; y = clinched division title; z = clinched regular season title

=== Standings ===
==== Central Division ====
Team	GP	W	L	OTL	Pts	GF	GA
xy – Fargo-Moorhead Jets	62	37	19	6	80	216	192
x – Southern Minnesota Express	62	35	23	4	74	206	177
x – Alexandria Blizzard	62	28	29	5	61	165	193
x – North Iowa Outlaws	62	27	29	6	60	174	198
Bismarck Bobcats	62	26	30	6	58	193	221
Springfield Jr. Blues	62	26	31	5	57	188	203

==== North Division ====
Team	GP	W	L	OTL	Pts	GF	GA
xyz – Mahoning Valley Phantoms	62	47	14	1	95	283	168
x – Alpena IceDiggers	62	37	20	5	79	232	194
x – USNTDP	62	28	30	4	60	211	215
x – Marquette Rangers	62	25	32	5	55	189	227
Traverse City North Stars	62	19	38	5	43	177	276

==== South Division ====
Team	GP	W	L	OTL	Pts	GF	GA
xy – St. Louis Bandits	62	43	14	5	91	228	153
x – Santa Fe RoadRunners	62	41	17	4	86	221	154
x – Texas Tornado	62	38	18	6	82	211	174
x – Fairbanks Ice Dogs	62	34	24	4	72	223	203
Wichita Falls Wildcats	62	22	34	6	50	175	227
Alaska Avalanche	62	16	39	7	39	148	242

=== Statistics ===
==== Scoring leaders ====
The following players led the league in regular season points at the completion of all regular season games.

Player	Team	GP	G	A	Pts	PIM
Patrick Maroon	St. Louis Bandits	57	40	55	95	160
Todd Rudasill	Alpena IceDiggers	59	33	56	89	101
Dustin Cloutier	Mahoning Valley Phantoms	52	41	41	82	81
Jesse Echternach	Fargo-Moorhead Jets	61	35	45	80	52
Joe Shean	Fairbanks Ice Dogs	62	22	57	79	84
Kyle Schmidt	Fairbanks Ice Dogs	62	45	33	78	74
Drew Pierson	Alpena IceDiggers	62	35	42	77	66
Chris Connolly	Fargo-Moorhead Jets	62	20	56	76	12
Tibor Kutalek	Mahoning Valley Phantoms	60	44	32	76	65
Nathan Longpre	Mahoning Valley Phantoms	61	27	38	65	36
Nolan Craner	Alpena IceDiggers	59	25	40	65	97

==== Leading goaltenders ====
Note: GP = Games played; Mins = Minutes played; W = Wins; L = Losses; OTL = Overtime losses; SOL = Shootout losses; SO = Shutouts; GAA = Goals against average; SV% = Save percentage

Player	Team	GP	Mins	W	L	OTL	SOL	GA	SO	SV	SV%	GAA
Nick Hopper	Wichita Falls Wildcats	48	2746:25	30	12	0	3	99	8	1,050	.906	2.16
Pat Nagle	St. Louis Bandits	36	2136:12	24	8	2	2	81	1	965	.916	2.28
Ryan Zapolski	Mahoning Valley Phantoms	51	3002:02	42	8	0	1	116	4	1,610	.928	2.32
Thomas Tragust	Texas Tornado	46	2586:22	27	11	2	3	109	2	1,089	.900	2.53
Lars Paulgaard	Southern Minnesota Express	51	2878:34	30	18	0	2	122	8	1,373	.911	2.54

== Robertson Cup playoffs ==
Four teams qualified for the Round Robin semifinal, the host (Fairbanks) and the three division champions. If Fairbanks won the South division final, the runner-up would receive the final qualifying spot. For the round robin semifinal, ties were broken first by head-to-head matchup and then by goal differential.
The team with the best record advanced directly to the championship game while the second- and third-place teams met in a semifinal.

Division Semifinals (Best-of-5)
C1	Fargo-Moorhead Jets	5	2	2	1	5*
C4	North Iowa Outlaws	2	1	4	2*	4
Central Division
C2	Southern Minnesota Express	1	9	6	1	1
C3	Alexandria Blizzard	4	1	0	2	0
N1	Mahoning Valley Phantoms	4	6	6	-	-
N4	Marquette Rangers	1	2	2	-	-
North Division
N2	Alpena IceDiggers	4	2	3	-	-
N3	USNTDP	5	3	5	-	-
S1	St. Louis Bandits	6	3*	3*	-	-
S4	Fairbanks Ice Dogs	2	2	2	-	-
South Division
S2	Santa Fe Roadrunners	1	5	2	4	2
S3	Texas Tornado	4	2	5	1	9

Division Finals (Best-of-5)
C1	Fargo-Moorhead Jets	1	3	2	-	-
C2	Southern Minnesota Express	5	4	3***	-	-
N1	Mahoning Valley Phantoms	2	3	6	-	-
N3	USNTDP	1	2	2	-	-
S1	St. Louis Bandits	3	4*	5	6	6
S2	Texas Tornado	4*	3	2	7	1

Semifinal (Round Robin)
C2	Southern Minnesota Express	-	1	1	5
N1	Mahoning Valley Phantoms	4	-	5	7
S1	St. Louis Bandits	3	2	-	4
S4	Fairbanks Ice Dogs	3	3	1	-

Championship (Best-of-1)
N1	Mahoning Valley Phantoms	4
S1	St. Louis Bandits	8
Consolation Game
C2	Southern Minnesota Express	3
S4	Fairbanks Ice Dogs	2

Note: * denotes overtime period(s)
