= Scott Langer =

American ice hockey coach

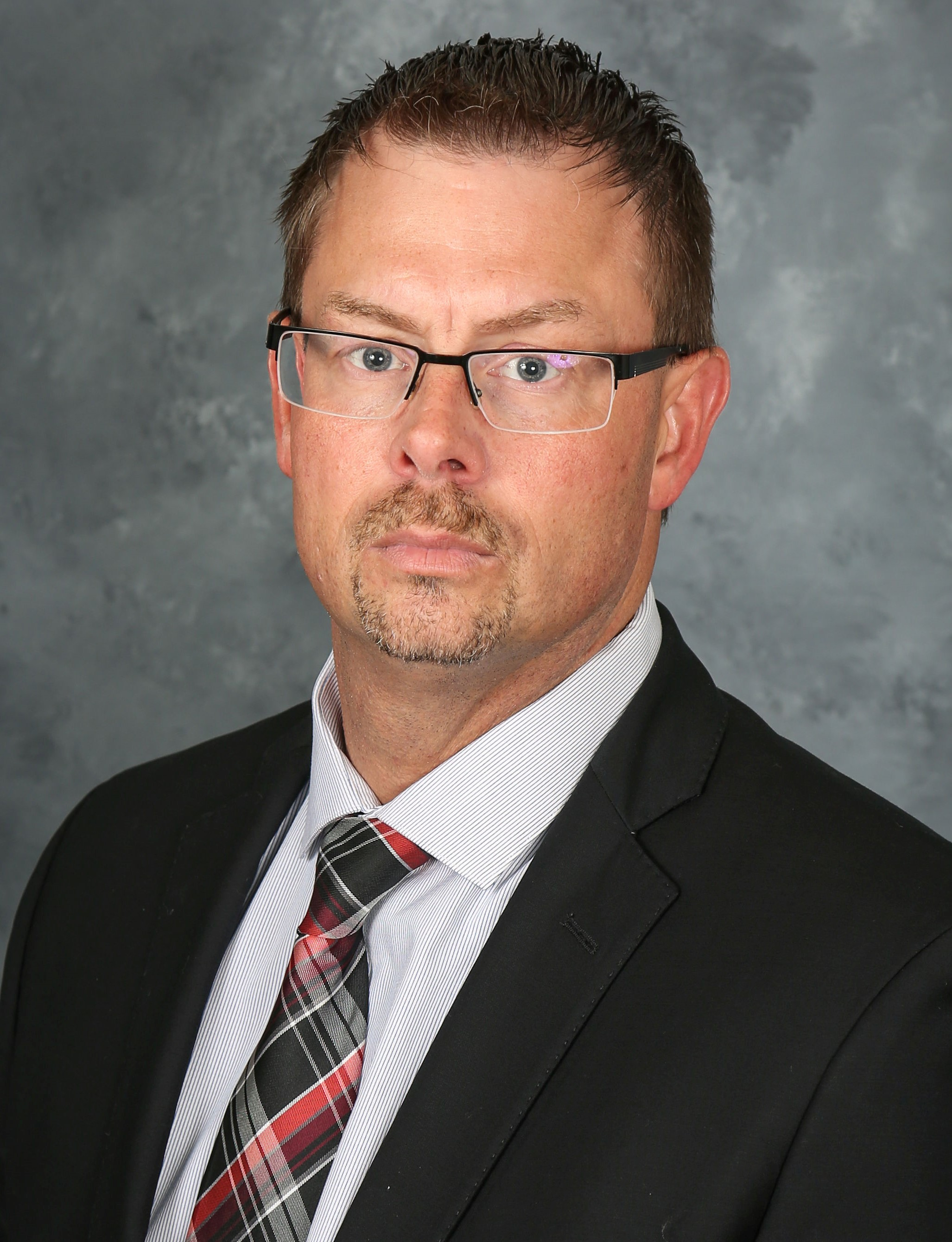
- Born: May 19, 1974 (age 51); Islip, New York, United States
- Current NAHL coach: Aberdeen Wings
- Coached for: Fargo Force Topeka Roadrunners
- Coaching career: 1997–present

Scott Langer (born May 19, 1974) is the current coach of the Aberdeen Wings in the North American Hockey League (NAHL). He previously held positions as the head coach of the Fargo Force, a Tier I junior hockey team in the United States Hockey League (USHL) and also served as the head coach and general manager of the Topeka RoadRunners. Langer is one of the most successful junior hockey coaches in the United States. He has amassed an overall record of 700-244-82 (.704), the most wins in NAHL history. Langer off the ice has helped over 290 junior hockey players reach the college hockey ranks while with the RoadRunners and Wings organizations.

== Career ==
Scott Langer began his career in junior hockey as a defenseman for the Bismarck Bullets and Bismarck Express in the American Frontier Hockey League. At the height of his junior career, 1994–95, he was named to the AFHL All-Star team. After completing his junior hockey career in Bismarck, Scott moved behind the bench coaching at the Bantam AA level.

In 1997, he was hired as an assistant coach for the AFHL/AWHL's Bismarck Bobcats where he remained until 2002. For the 2002–03 season, he served as assistant coach for the United States Hockey League's Chicago Steel before accepting a position with the Lone Star Cavalry of the NAHL in 2003. He took over as head coach after the team's move to Santa Fe, New Mexico in 2004. In 2007, the team moved to Topeka, Kansas where he built the program into the most successful franchise in the cities history with a 284-90-38 record and a .736 winning percentage.

He also served as general manager of the Topeka RoadRunners beginning with the 2007–08 season. Under his guidance the Topeka RoadRunners were named NAHL Organization of the Year in 2007–08. In 2009–10 he received the prestigious honor of being named the NAHL GM of the Year. While with the RoadRunners, his teams earned the NAHL regular season title once, NAHL South Division regular season title three times, made it to the playoff Division Finals six times, and advanced to the Robertson Cup Tournament twice. On January 7, 2016, the RoadRunners fired Langer after 12 seasons.

On April 13, 2016, the NAHL's Aberdeen Wings announced it had signed Langer to be the head coach on a three-year contract beginning with the 2016–17 season. In his first season with the Aberdeen Wings he led the team to a NAHL Central Division Playoff Championship and the organizations first Robertson Cup appearance. He was named 2016–17 Central Division Coach of the Year. In Langer's second season with the Wings he guided the organization to its first Regular Season Central Division Championship.

In 2019, Scott was promoted to Head Coach and General Manager of the Aberdeen Wings organization taking over the General Manager title from Pete Sauer and Greg Odde.

During the 2018–19 season, Langer led the Wings to a record breaking season. The team set 22 records including a 19-game win streak. He guided the Wings to a multitude of accomplishments including Central Division Regular Season Champions, Central Division Playoff Champions, NAHL Central Division and League Goaltender of Year, and NAHL Central Division Coach of the Year. On May 14, 2019, Langer and the Aberdeen Wings won the NAHL's Robertson Cup Championship.

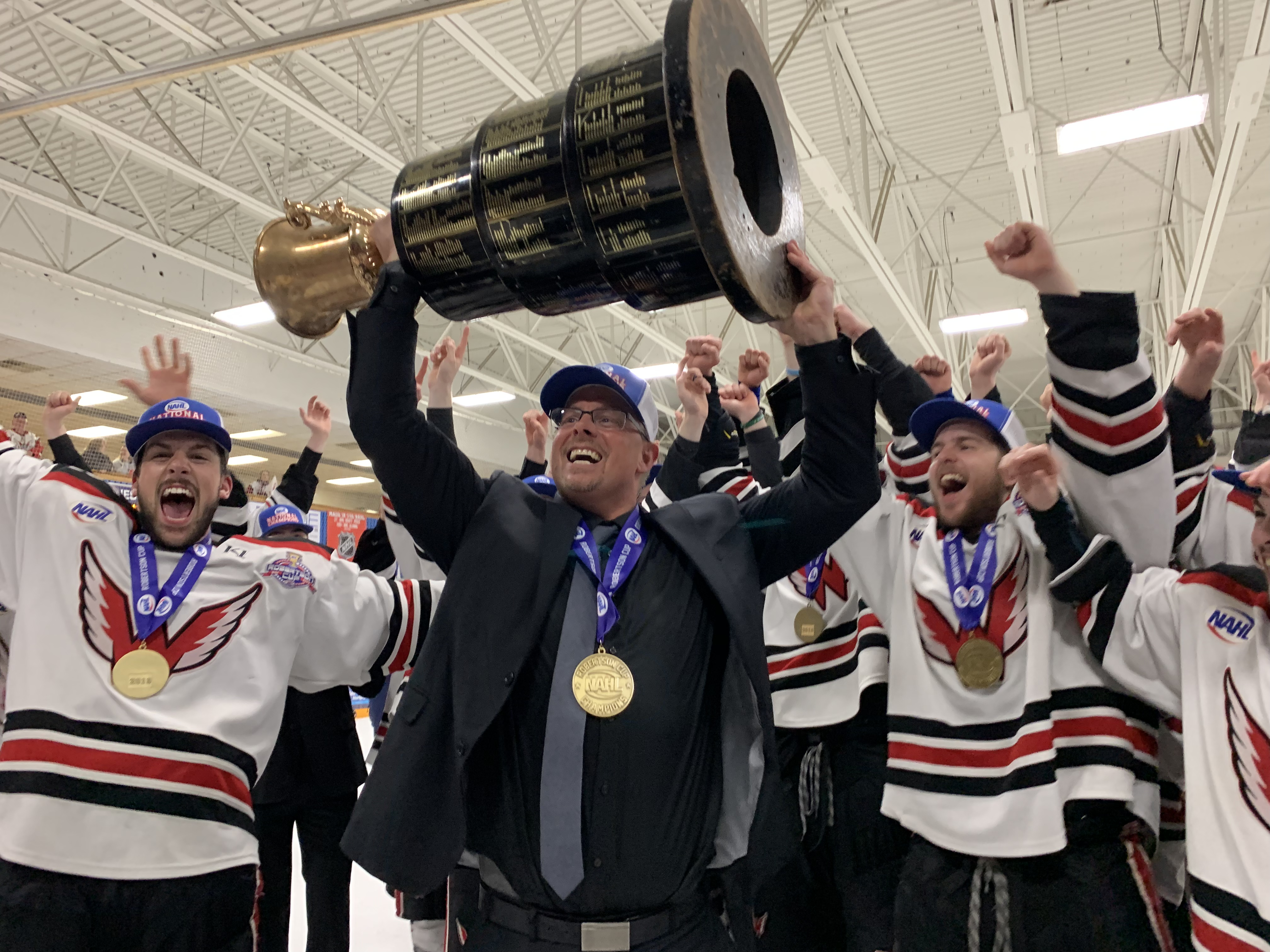
Scott Langer 2019 Robertson Cup

In August 2019, Scott was selected as Head Coach of the North American Hockey Leagues Team NAHL. This selects team competed in international competition in Moscow and at the Junior Club World Cup in Sochi, Russia. He led the team to an international record of 3-2-0-0 (.600) finishing 5th.

He remained the head coach of the Wings until he was hired by the Tier I Fargo Force of the United States Hockey League in July 2021. On April 28, 2022 the Fargo Force announced that they had parted ways with Langer after one season behind the bench.

In July 2022, Langer was rehired by the Aberdeen Wings organization to serve as their General Manager and President of Hockey Operations.

=== Coaching history ===
- 1997–2002: Bismarck Bobcats AFHL/AWHL assistant coach
- 2002–03: Chicago Steel USHL assistant coach
- 2003–04: Lone Star Cavalry NAHL assistant coach
- 2004–07: Santa Fe RoadRunners NAHL head coach and general manager
- 2007–16: Topeka RoadRunners NAHL head coach and general manager
- 2016–2021: Aberdeen Wings NAHL head coach and general manager
- 2019: Team NAHL - Junior Club World Cup head coach
- 2021-2022: Fargo Force USHL head coach
- 2022-Current: Aberdeen Wings NAHL head coach and general manager

== Awards and achievements ==
- 1994–95: Named to the AFHL All-Star Team
- 2007–08: NAHL Organization of the Year
- 2008: NAHL Showcase Tournament Champions
- 2009: Assistant coach of the South Division Top Prospect (NAHL) team
- 2009–10: NAHL GM of the Year
- 2010: Assistant coach of South Division Top Prospect (NAHL) team
- 2010: Received Level 5 Certification with USA Hockey
- 2010: Assistant coach of Team Rafalski Top Prospect (NAHL) team
- 2011: Head coach of the South Division Top Prospect (NAHL) team
- 2010–11: NAHL Coach of the Year
- 2012: Assistant coach of the South Division Top Prospect (NAHL) team
- March 10, 2012: Achieved 300 career wins as head coach
- 2013: Head coach of the Midwest Group Top Prospect (NAHL) team
- 2014: Assistant coach of the South Division Top Prospect (NAHL) team
- November 29, 2014: Achieved 400 career wins as head coach
- 2015: Head Coach of the South Division Top Prospect (NAHL) team
- 2016-17: NAHL Central Division Coach of the Year
- 2018: Head Coach of the Central Division Top Prospect (NAHL) team
- March 17, 2018: Achieved 500 career wins as head coach
- 2018: NAHL Central Division Organization of the Year
- 2019: Head Coach of the Central Division Top Prospect (NAHL) team
- 2018-19: NAHL Central Division Coach of the Year
- 2018-19: NAHL Central Division Organization of the Year
- 2018-19: NAHL Central Division Regular Season Champions
- 2018-19: NAHL Central Division Playoff Champions
- 2018-19: NAHL Robertson Cup Champions
- 2020: Head Coach of the Central Division Top Prospect (NAHL) team
- January 2, 2021: Win #603, which made him the Winningest Coach in NAHL History
- 2020-21: NAHL Regular Season Champions
- 2020-21: NAHL Central Division Regular Season Champions
- 2020-21: NAHL Central Division Playoff Champions
- 2021: NAHL Central Division Coach of the Year
- 2021: NAHL Central Division GM of the Year
- 2021: NAHL Coach of the Year
- 2021: NAHL GM of the Year
