= 2007–08 NAHL season =

- League: North American Hockey League
- Sport: Ice hockey
- Duration: Regular season September 14, 2007 – March 30, 2008; Postseason; April 4 – May 5, 2008
- Games: 58
- Teams: 18

Regular season
- Season champions: St. Louis Bandits
- Season MVP: Cody Reichard (Fairbanks Ice Dogs)
- Top scorer: Adam Cardwell (Wichita Falls Wildcats)

Robertson Cup Playoffs
- Robertson Cup Playoffs MVP: Kyle O'Kane (Bandits)
- Finals champions: St. Louis Bandits
- Runners-up: Mahoning Valley Phantoms

NAHL seasons
- ← 2006–07 2008–09 →

The 2007–08 NAHL season was the 24th season of the North American Hockey League. The regular season ran from September 2007 to April 2008 with a 58-game schedule for each team. The St. Louis Bandits won the regular season championship and went on to defeated the Mahoning Valley Phantoms 5 to 2 to capture the Robertson Cup.

== Member changes ==
- On February 22, 2007, the Santa Fe RoadRunners announced that they would relocate to Topeka, Kansas for this season. The team retained its nickname.
- The NAHL continued its expansion into Alaska with the addition of the Kenai River Brown Bears as an expansion franchise.

== Regular season ==
The standings at the end of the regular season were as follows:

Note: x = clinched playoff berth; y = clinched division title; z = clinched regular season title

=== Standings ===
==== Central Division ====
Team	GP	W	L	OTL	Pts	GF	GA
xy – North Iowa Outlaws	58	38	16	4	80	195	137
x – Southern Minnesota Express	58	29	21	8	66	203	229
x – Alexandria Blizzard	58	29	25	4	62	222	223
x – Springfield Jr. Blues	58	27	26	5	59	190	190
Fargo-Moorhead Jets	58	25	30	3	53	201	199
Bismarck Bobcats	58	20	32	6	46	148	215

==== North Division ====
Team	GP	W	L	OTL	Pts	GF	GA
xyz – St. Louis Bandits	58	47	9	2	96	250	149
x – Mahoning Valley Phantoms	58	36	18	4	76	227	173
x – Alpena IceDiggers	58	30	23	5	65	184	177
x – Team USA	58	28	26	4	60	177	186
Traverse City North Stars	58	23	23	12	58	176	203
Marquette Rangers	58	26	29	3	55	186	216

==== South Division ====
Team	GP	W	L	OTL	Pts	GF	GA
xy – Topeka RoadRunners	58	39	11	8	86	242	137
x – Fairbanks Ice Dogs	58	39	15	4	82	183	129
x – Wichita Falls Wildcats	58	38	18	2	78	221	181
x – Texas Tornado	58	20	33	5	45	165	201
Alaska Avalanche	58	16	38	4	36	158	270
Kenai River Brown Bears	58	12	38	8	32	144	257

=== Statistics ===
==== Scoring leaders ====
The following players led the league in regular season points at the completion of all regular season games.

Player	Team	GP	G	A	Pts	PIM
Adam Cardwell	Wichita Falls Wildcats	56	32	49	91	69
Luke Salazar	Wichita Falls Wildcats	58	41	46	87	38
Shea Walters	North Iowa Outlaws	57	24	60	84	45
Luke Nesper	Alexandria Blizzard	57	25	55	80	97
Ben Warda	St. Louis Bandits	58	31	43	74	106
Mikael Lickteig	Alexandria Blizzard	58	34	40	74	113
Derek Graham	Mahoning Valley Phantoms	57	29	41	70	54
Erik Peterson	Alpena IceDiggers	56	23	47	70	80
Corey Jendras	Topeka RoadRunners	57	30	39	69	18
Grant Everett	Wichita Falls Wildcats	55	18	50	68	169

==== Leading goaltenders ====
Note: GP = Games played; Mins = Minutes played; W = Wins; L = Losses; OTL = Overtime losses; SOL = Shootout losses; SO = Shutouts; GAA = Goals against average; SV% = Save percentage

Player	Team	GP	Mins	W	L	OTL	SOL	GA	SO	SV	SV%	GAA
Robby Moss	North Iowa Outlaws	41	2389:57	28	7	2	2	76	5	1,262	.940	1.91
Cody Reichard	Fairbanks Ice Dogs	51	2951:05	33	15	0	2	101	7	1,321	.924	2.05
Bryce Merriam	Topeka RoadRunners	44	2670:40	26	11	4	3	102	4	963	.894	2.29
Cal Heeter	St. Louis Bandits	34	1972:00	25	6	1	0	80	2	938	.915	2.43
Mike Johnson	St. Louis Bandits	26	1522:57	21	3	1	0	65	1	704	.908	2.56

== Robertson Cup playoffs ==
Four teams qualified for the Round Robin semifinal, the host (St. Louis) and the three division champions. If St. Louis won the Central division final, the runner-up would receive the final qualifying spot. For the round robin semifinal, ties were broken first by head-to-head matchup and then by goal differential.
The team with the best record advanced directly to the championship game while the second- and third-place teams met in a semifinal.

Division Semifinals (Best-of-5)
C1	North Iowa Outlaws	1	2	4	-	-
C4	Springfield Jr. Blues	3	6	5*	-	-
Central Division
C2	Southern Minnesota Express	3	2	5	4	2
C3	Alexandria Blizzard	6	3*	3	2	5
N1	St. Louis Bandits	4	7	6	-	-
N4	USNTDP	2	2	2	-	-
North Division
N2	Mahoning Valley Phantoms	3*	5	3*	-	-
N3	Alpena IceDiggers	2	2	2	-	-
S1	Topeka Roadrunners	6	7	5	-	-
S4	Texas Tornado	2	0	1	-	-
South Division
S2	Fairbanks Ice Dogs	4	1	3	6	-
S3	Wichita Falls Wildcats	0	3	1	3	-

Division Finals (Best-of-5)
C4	Springfield Jr. Blues	5	2	3	6	1
C3	Alexandria Blizzard	2	3	4*	0	2*
N1	St. Louis Bandits	4	5	0	5*	-
N2	Mahoning Valley Phantoms	1	2	3	4	-
S1	Topeka RoadRunners	3	1	5	1	5*
S2	Fairbanks Ice Dogs	1	3	3	3	4

Quarterfinal (Round Robin)
C3	Alexandria Blizzard	-	2	2	1
N1	St. Louis Bandits	3	-	5	3
S1	Topeka RoadRunners	4	2	-	3
N2	Mahoning Valley Phantoms	6	3	2	-

Semifinal (Best-of-1)
S1	Topeka RoadRunners	2
N2	Mahoning Valley Phantoms	5

Championship (Best-of-1)
S1	St. Louis Bandits	5
W2	Mahoning Valley Phantoms	2

Note: * denotes overtime period(s)
