= Boston Junior Blackhawks =

- City: Saugus, Massachusetts
- League: IJHL Super Elite
- Division: New England
- Founded: 1995
- Home arena: Kasabuski Memorial Ice Arena
- Colors: Red, Black, and White
- Owner(s): Richard Salsman
- Head coach: Kevin Kotyluk and Richie Salsman
- Affiliate: Texas Tornado (NAHL) (higher)

Franchise history
- 1995-Present: Boston Junior Blackhawks

The Boston Junior Blackhawks were a Junior "A" ice hockey team from Saugus, Massachusetts. They were a member of the International Junior Hockey League. The Jr. Blackhawks fielded teams in the IJHL Super Elite League, IJHL Elite League, as well as youth selects and other youth ice hockey levels in other local youth hockey leagues. The Jr. Blackhawks played their home games at the Kasabuski Memorial Ice Arena. The Boston Junior Blackhawks were the affiliate of the Texas Tornado of the Tier II Jr A North American Hockey League.

== Alumni ==
The Jr. Blackhawks have produced over 300 alumni playing in higher levels of junior ice hockey, Major Jr., NCAA Division I and Division III, and ACHA college programs, and professional hockey, including:

- Paul D'Agostino - Evansville IceMen (AAHL
- Jimmy Pellegrino - Jamestown Vikings (Mid Atlantic Hockey League (2007) MAHL
- Lukas Dvorak - ATUS Weiz (Oberliga)
- Kyle McCullough - Brooklyn Aces (EPHL, Bloomington PrairieThunder (IHL)
- Simo Pulkki - SaiPa (SM-liiga)
- Rob Lalonde - Reading Royals (ECHL), Toronto Marlies (AHL)
