= Texas Tornado =

- City: Frisco, Texas
- League: North American Hockey League
- Division: South
- Founded: 1999
- Home arena: Dr Pepper Arena
- Colors: Black, gold, and white
- Owner: Consolidated Sports Holdings USA
- General manager: Tony Curtale
- Head coach: Tony Curtale
- Media: B2 Networks
- Affiliates: Boston Junior Blackhawks (IJHL) (lower)

Franchise history
- 1999–2013: Texas Tornado
- 2013–present: Lone Star Brahmas

Championships
- Regular season titles: 3: 2000, 2004, 2005
- Division titles: 7: 2000, 2001, 2002, 2003, 2004, 2005, 2006
- Robertson Cups: 5: 2001, 2004, 2005, 2006, 2012

The Texas Tornado were a Junior A hockey team located in Frisco, Texas, USA. The team joined the North American Hockey League's Central division in 1999 (and moved into the newly formed southern division three years later) while located in North Richland Hills, Texas, and enjoyed unprecedented success since their expansion year.

The Tornado played their home games at the 6,000-seat Dr Pepper Arena in Frisco.

On May 13, 2006, the Tornado won their third straight Robertson Cup by defeating the Bozeman Icedogs. This accomplishment would be the first time in over 15 years that a team won three consecutive Robertson Cups. On May 8, 2012, the Tornado won their 5th Robertson Cup in team history by defeating the St. Louis Bandits 4-3 in overtime. The Tornado were owned and operated by the Consolidated Sports Holdings USA, Inc. In the 2013 offseason, the Tornado were sold to Texas Hockey Partners (THP) and relocated back to North Richland Hills becoming the Lone Star Brahmas.

== Season records ==
Season	GP	W	L	OTL	PTS	GF	GA	PIM	Finish	Playoffs
1999–2000	56	42	12	2	86	239	133	1,451	1st of 5, West; 1st of 11, NAHL	Won Div. Semifinal series, 2–0 (Chicago Freeze); Won Robertson Cup Semifinal series, 2–0 (Soo Indians); Lost Robertson Cup Championship series, 0–3 (Danville Wings)
2000–01	56	40	12	4	84	265	158	1,541	1st of 5, West; 2nd of 11, NAHL	Won Div. Semifinal series, 2–0 (Springfield Jr. Blues); Won Div. Final series, 2–0 (Danville Wings); Won Robertson Cup Championship series, 3–1 (Soo Indians)
2001–02	56	40	13	3	83	208	135	1,826	1st of 5, West; 2nd of 11, NAHL	Won Div. Semifinal series, 2–1 (Chicago Freeze); Lost Robertson Cup Semifinal series, 1–2 (Pittsburgh Forge)
2002–03	56	41	13	2	84	214	142	1,928	1st of 5, West; 2nd of 11, NAHL	Won Div. Semifinal series, 2–0 (Springfield Jr. Blues); Won Robertson Cup Semifinal series, 2–1 (Detroit Compuware Ambassadors); Lost Robertson Cup Championship series, 1–3 (Pittsburgh Forge)
2003–04	56	48	6	2	98	276	123	1,705	1st of 7, South; 1st of 21, NAHL	Won Div. Semifinal series, 3–0 (Texarkana Bandits); Won Div. Final series, 3–0 (Fairbanks Ice Dogs); Won Round-Robin Semifinal, 1–0 (Springfield Jr. Blues), 2–1 (Fairbanks Ice Dogs), 8–3 (Bismarck Bobcats); Won Robertson Cup Championship, 4–1 (Bismarck Bobcats)
2004–05	56	42	13	1	85	226	120	1,786	1st of 7, South; 1st of 19, NAHL	Won Div. Semifinal series, 3–0 (Wichita Falls Wildcats); Won Div. Final series, 4–1 (Texarkana Bandits); Won Round-Robin Semifinal, 4–1 (Soo Indians), 4–1 (Fargo-Moorhead Jets), 4–1 (Bismarck Bobcats); Won Robertson Cup Championship, 6–1 (Fargo-Moorhead Jets)
2005–06	58	42	12	4	88	201	132	1,516	1st of 5, South; 2nd of 20, NAHL	Won Div. Semifinal series, 3–2 (Wichita Falls Wildcats); Won Div. Final series, 4–0 (Texarkana Bandits); Won Round-Robin Semifinal, 3–7 (Southern Minnesota Express), 5–3 (Cleveland Jr. Barons), 4–3 (Southern Minnesota Express); Won Robertson Cup Championship, 4–2 (Bozeman IceDogs)
2006–07	62	38	18	6	82	211	174	1,484	3rd of 6, South; 4th of 17, NAHL	Won Div. Semifinal series, 3–2 (Santa Fe Roadrunners); Lost Div. Final series, 2–3 (St. Louis Bandits)
2007–08	58	20	33	5	45	165	201	1,588	4th of 6, South; 16th of 18, NAHL	Lost Div. Semifinal series, 0–3 (Topeka Roadrunners)
2008–09	Did Not Play									
2009–10	58	25	28	5	55	170	204	1,693	3rd of 5, South; 13th of 19, NAHL	Lost Div. Semifinal series, 2–3 (St. Louis Bandits)
2010–11	58	35	15	8	78	213	164	1,321	t-2nd of 6, South t-5th of 26, NAHL	Lost Div. Semifinal series, 1–3 (Amarillo Bulls)
2011–12	60	36	16	8	80	215	159	1,190	t-2nd of 7, South; 6th of 28, NAHL	Lost Div. Semifinal series, 0–3 (Topeka RoadRunners); Won Round-Robin Quarterfinal, 2–3 (OT) (St. Louis Bandits), 5–3 (Port Huron Fighting Falcons), 2–3 (OT) (Amarillo Bulls); Won Robertson Cup Semifinal, 4–3 (OT) (Fairbanks Ice Dogs); Won Robertson Cup Championship, 4–3 (OT) (St. Louis Bandits)
2012–13	60	36	22	2	74	219	168	1,123	3rd of 6, South; 10th of 24, NAHL	Won Div. Semifinal series, 3–0 (Topeka Roadrunners); Lost Div. Final series, 0–3 (Amarillo Bulls)
Totals	750	485	242	52	1,012	2,822	2,013	20,227	7 Division Titles	5 Championships

== Tornado alumni in the NHL ==
The Tornado were equally successful in preparing players for the next level of hockey. Especially of note are the goaltenders to come out of the system. The more notable players include -

- Stephane Da Costa, F, Ottawa Senators
- Al Montoya, G, Montreal Canadiens
- Ben Bishop, G, Dallas Stars
- Dave McKee, G, Anaheim Ducks
- Andy Wozniewski, D, Toronto Maple Leafs
- Matt Nickerson, D, Dallas Stars
- Jake Newton, D, Anaheim Ducks
- Matt Tennyson, D, San Jose Sharks
