= Fargo–Moorhead Jets =

- City: Fargo, North Dakota
- League: North American Hockey League
- Founded: 2003
- Folded: 2008
- Home arena: John E. Carlson Coliseum
- Colors: Black, red, silver

Franchise history
- 2003–2008: Fargo-Moorhead Jets

Championships
- Division titles: 2 (2005, 2007)

The Fargo–Moorhead Jets were a Junior A ice hockey team in the North American Hockey League's central division, and played out of John E. Carlson Coliseum in Fargo, North Dakota. Their inaugural NAHL season was the 2003–2004 season. The team won regular-season division titles in the 2004-2005 and 2006-2007 seasons. On May 19, 2008, the league announced that the team would cease operations after relocation attempts were unsuccessful. The Jets folded ahead of the inaugural season for the Fargo Force of the USHL.

== Season-by-season records ==
Season	GP	W	L	OTL	Pts	GF	GA	Finish	Playoffs
2003–04	56	33	21	2	68	187	160	2nd of 7, West; 6th of 21 NAHL	Lost Div. Semifinal series, 0–3 (Bismarck Bobcats)
2004–05	56	36	17	3	75	222	148	1st of 7, West; 4th of 19 NAHL	Won Div. Semifinal series, 3–0 (Minnesota Blizzard); Won Div. Semifinal series, 4–0 (Billings Bulls); Won Round Robin, 8–2 (Soo Indians), 1–4 (Texas Tornado), 3–0 (Bismarck Bobcats); Lost Robertson Cup Championship, 1–6 (Texas Tornado)
2005–06	58	34	21	3	71	209	147	2nd of 5, Central; 8th of 20 NAHL	Won Div. Semifinal series, 3–2 (Bismarck Bobcats); Won Div. Semifinal series, 0–4 (Southern Minnesota Express)
2006–07	62	37	19	6	80	216	192	1st of 6, Central; 5th of 17 NAHL	Won Div. Semifinal series, 3–2 (North Iowa Outlaws); Won Div. Semifinal series, 0–3 (Southern Minnesota Express)
2007–08	58	25	30	3	53	201	199	5th of 6, Central; 14th of 18 NAHL	Did not qualify
