= Amarillo Wranglers (NAHL) =

- City: Amarillo, Texas
- League: North American Hockey League
- Division: South
- Founded: 2003
- Home arena: Amarillo Civic Center
- Colors: Navy blue, red, white
- Owners: Amarillo Ice Sports, LLC
- General manager: Harry Mahood
- Head coach: Michael Hill (2025)

Franchise history
- 2003–2004: Lone Star Cavalry
- 2004–2007: Santa Fe RoadRunners
- 2007–2018: Topeka RoadRunners
- 2018–2020: Topeka Pilots
- 2020–2021: Kansas City Scouts
- 2021–present: Amarillo Wranglers

Championships
- Regular season titles: 1 (2011)
- Division titles: 3 (2008, 2010, 2011)

The Amarillo Wranglers are a Tier II junior ice hockey team in the North American Hockey League's South Division. The team's home arena is the Amarillo Civic Center in Amarillo, Texas.

== History ==
=== Lone Star Cavalry ===
The Lone Star Cavalry were granted an expansion franchise in the America West Hockey League in March 2003. They stayed in the league when it merged with the North American Hockey League for the 2003–04 season. The Cavalry played out of the Blue Line Ice Complex in North Richland Hills, Texas and served the immediate "Mid-Cities" area of Metro Dallas-Fort Worth. The Cavalry were part of the NAHL's new South Division along with the Central Texas Blackhawks, Fairbanks Ice Dogs, Springfield (MO) Spirit, Texas Tornado, Texarkana Bandits, and Wichita Falls Rustlers.

=== Santa Fe RoadRunners ===
After financial difficulties caused the Cavalry's home rink, the Blue Line Ice Complex, to close, the Cavalry were left without a home. Due to this and other factors, the Cavalry ended up being sold and relocated to Santa Fe, New Mexico. The team was granted membership on September 20, 2004, and began play on September 25, 2004, under their new identity as the Santa Fe RoadRunners. The Santa Fe RoadRunners played out of the Genoveva Chavez Community Center in Santa Fe. In their inaugural season in New Mexico, the RoadRunners played in the South Division, against the Central Texas Marshals, Springfield (IL) Jr. Blues, Springfield Spirit, Texarkana Bandits, Texas Tornado, and the Wichita Falls Wildcats, finishing with a 33–15–8 record, good for 3rd place in the division. The following season they finished dead last in the South Division behind the Tornado, Bandits, Jr. Blues, and the Wildcats. The third and final season in Santa Fe saw the RoadRunners finishing with a 41–17–4 record for second place in a South Division that consisted of the St. Louis Bandits, Texas Tornado, Fairbanks Ice Dogs, Wichita Falls Wildcats, and the Alaska Avalanche.

=== Topeka RoadRunners ===
Topeka RoadRunners logo

On February 26, 2007, the team announced their move to Topeka, Kansas, from Santa Fe, New Mexico, due to claims of poor attendance. Santa Fe ranked 17th out of 18 teams in attendance.

The move to Topeka was initiated by a grass roots effort, led by hockey fans from Topeka. In their first season in Topeka, 2007–08, they were third in league attendance while playing in Landon Arena. That season the team won the NAHL South Division and South Division Playoffs. They finished in third place at the Robertson Cup competition. The 2008–09 season saw the RoadRunners finishing fourth in league attendance and 2nd in the South Division. The team lost in the second round of the South Division playoffs. In 2009–10 The RoadRunners finished first in the South Division, and they were second in attendance. The 2010–11 season saw the RoadRunners claim the NAHL President's Cup as the league's regular season champions.

On January 7, 2016, the RoadRunners fired long-tenured head coach and general manager Scott Langer, who had been with the team since their days as the Cavalry and the head coach since their first season in Santa Fe. He was hired immediately after the season ended by the Aberdeen Wings. Former RoadRunner player and assistant coach Josh Kamrass was hired as his replacement. On November 24, 2017, assistant coach Justin DeMartino took over as an interim head coach, so that Kamrass could spend more time at home and took a front office job with the organization overseeing all the ownership's teams including their Tier III teams.

=== Topeka Pilots ===
Topeka Pilots logo

On April 18, 2018, owners of the franchise since 2009, Barbara & Donald Stone, sold the franchise to Loretto Sports Ventures, a company owned by Lamar Hunt Jr., that also operates the Kansas City Mavericks in the ECHL. In the same press conference, Hunt announced the new head coach and general manager as Simon Watson for the 2018–19 season. The new ownership also announced the team would be rebranded and was renamed the Topeka Pilots on June 5, 2018.

=== Amarillo Wranglers ===
On February 28, 2020, Lamar Hunt Jr. announced he was moving the team to the Kansas City metropolitan area for the 2020–21 season. The team was renamed after the former NHL team, the Kansas City Scouts, and were to play at least the 2020–21 season at the Kansas City Ice Center in the suburb of Shawnee, Kansas. However, the team instead went dormant for the 2020–21 season due to the on-going COVID-19 pandemic with plans to return for the 2021–22 season. The Scouts also received dormancy status for the 2021–22 season on March 4, 2021, however, the team would never play a game as the Scouts.

On May 21, 2021, the NAHL announced Hunt had instead sold the team to Amarillo Ice Sports, LLC, a locally owned and operated group including Chris Wright, Roger Wright, and Amarillo hockey alumni Eric Andersen, and Austin Sutter. The new team was named after the original Amarillo Wranglers. The Wranglers re-entered the league for the 2021–22 season, replacing the recently relocated Amarillo Bulls in the Amarillo Civic Center, with Harry Mahood as general manager and head coach. The Wranglers then hired Karlis Zirnis as director of player personnel.

== Season-by-season records ==
Season	GP	W	L	OTL	Pts	GF	GA	PIM	Finish	Playoffs
Lone Star Calvary
2003–04	56	28	22	6	62	158	171	1,504	5th of 7, South t-13th of 21 NAHL	Did not qualify
Santa Fe RoadRunners
2004–05	56	33	18	5	71	201	163	1,602	3rd of 7, South t-6th of 19 NAHL	Lost Div. Semifinal series, 1–3 (Texarkana Bandits)
2005–06	58	24	28	6	54	182	205	1,418	5th of 5, South; 13th of 20 NAHL	Did not qualify
2006–07	62	41	17	4	86	221	154	1,240	2nd of 6, South; 4th of 17 NAHL	Lost Div. Semifinal series, 2–3 (Texas Tornado)
Topeka RoadRunners
2007–08	58	39	11	8	86	242	137	1,509	1st of 6, South; 2nd of 18 NAHL	Won Div. Semifinal series, 3–0 (Texas Tornado); Won Div. Semifinal series, 3–2 (Fairbanks Ice Dogs); Won Round Robin, 4–2 (Alexandria Blizzard), 2–5 (St. Louis Bandits), 3–2 (Mahoning Valley Phantoms); Lost Robertson Cup Semifinal, 2–5 (Mahoning Valley Phantoms)
2008–09	58	42	11	5	89	204	138	1,545	2nd of 4, South; 2nd of 19 NAHL	Won Div. Semifinal series, 3–2 (Wichita Falls Wildcats); Lost Div. Final series, 1–3 (St. Louis Bandits)
2009–10	58	44	9	5	93	254	147	1,500	1st of 5, South t-1st of 19 NAHL	Won Div. Semifinal series, 3–1 (Springfield Jr. Blues); Lost Div. Final series, 2–3 (St. Louis Bandits)
2010–11	58	43	12	3	89	237	146	1,706	1st of 6, South; 1st of 26 NAHL	Won Div. Semifinal series, 3–2 (Wichita Falls Wildcats); Lost Div. Final series, 2–3 (Amarillo Bulls)
2011–12	60	38	18	4	80	197	152	1,247	t-2nd of 7, South t-4th of 28 NAHL	Won Div. Semifinal series, 3–0 (Texas Tornado); Lost Div. Final series, 1–3 (Amarillo Bulls)
2012–13	60	39	14	7	85	190	146	1343	2nd of 6, South; 4th of 24 NAHL	Lost Div. Semifinal series, 0–3 (Texas Tornado)
2013–14	60	39	15	6	84	180	122	1090	2nd of 7, South; 3rd of 24 NAHL	Won Div. Semifinal series, 3–0 (Rio Grande Valley Killer Bees); Won Div. Final series, 3–2 (Amarillo Bulls); Lost Robertson Cup Semifinal series, 1–2 (Austin Bruins)
2014–15	60	39	15	6	84	199	140	837	2nd of 8, South t-4th of 24 NAHL	Won Div. Semifinal series, 3–1 (Wichita Falls Wildcats); Lost Div. Final series, 1–3 (Lone Star Brahmas)
2015–16	60	34	24	2	70	190	154	1044	3rd of 6, South; 10th of 22 NAHL	Won Div. Semifinal series, 3–1 (Lone Star Brahmas); Lost Div. Final series, 0–3 (Wichita Falls Wildcats)
2016–17	60	21	34	5	47	176	228	1322	7th of 7, South; 22nd of 24 NAHL	Did not qualify
2017–18	60	17	39	4	38	128	233	1217	6th of 6, South; 23rd of 23 NAHL	Did not qualify
Topeka Pilots
2018–19	60	23	29	8	54	158	210	933	5th of 6, South; 19th of 24 NAHL	Did not qualify
2019–20	52	33	14	5	71	151	129	981	3rd of 7, South; 8th of 23 NAHL	Postseason cancelled
Kansas City Scouts
2020–21	Did not play									
Amarillo Wranglers
2021–22	60	27	29	4	58	149	182	1233	6th of 8, South; 22nd of 29 NAHL	Did not qualify
2022–23	60	34	23	3	71	183	154	1112	4th of 8, South; 9th of 29 NAHL	Lost Div. Semifinal series, 0–3 (Oklahoma Warriors)
2023–24	60	32	20	8	72	178	184	1416	5th of 8, South; 14th of 29 NAHL	Lost Div. Play-in series, 0–2 New Mexico Ice Wolves
2024–25	59	24	29	6	54	157	196	959	8th of 9, South; 26th of 35 NAHL	Did not qualify

== Players ==
=== Current roster ===
#	Nat.	Name	Pos	Shoots/Catches	DOB	Height	Weight	Hometown
74	(Sweden)	Alexander Aleslov	F	L	2004-03-13	5'11"	185	Arboga, Sweden
10	(United States)	Jake Boulanger	F	R	2005-10-18	6'1"	180	Barre, Vermont, USA
44	(United States)	Trace Day	F	L	2005-01-19	6'4"	210	Mesa, Arizona, USA
25	(United States)	Luke Goldberg	F	L	2005-08-24	6'2"	190	Algonquin, Illinois, USA
22	(United States)	Cru Hanas	F	L	2005-04-23	6'3"	185	Highland Village, Texas, USA
39	(Sweden)	Carl Jacobson	F	L	2004-06-25	5'10"	180	Stockholm, Sweden
15	(United States)	Braydin Lund	F	R	2006-01-11	5'10"	160	Thief River Falls, Minnesota, USA
19	(Canada)	Corson Maguire	F	R	2005-04-28	5'10"	185	Toronto, Ontario, Canada
21	(United States)	Jacob Miller	F	L	2005-04-19	6'4"	210	Ossining, New York, USA
27	(Canada)	Andrew Morton	F	R	2004-05-14	6'1"	185	Uxbridge, Ontario, Canada
11	(United States)	Morley Phillips	F	R	2004-03-14	6'4"	210	Raleigh, North Carolina, USA
77	(United States)	Daniel Rassega	F	L	2006-03-14	5'11"	180	Phoenix, Arizona, USA
16	(United States)	Noah Ribeiro	F	L	2005-01-12	6'0"	198	Nashville, Tennessee, USA
3	(Canada)	Nikita Ushakov	F	L	2005-03-01	6'5"	205	Dauphin, Manitoba, Canada
12	(United States)	Noah Wood	F	R	2004-12-23	6'2"	190	Bloomfield Hills, Michigan, USA
4	(United States)	Ashton Breyer	D	L	2004-05-26	6'4"	195	Mound, Minnesota, USA
9	(United States)	Salvatore Cerrato	D	R	2004-06-10	5'10"	180	St. Louis, Missouri, USA
14	(United States)	Hayden Hedquist	D	L	2006-05-22	6'4"	195	Heron Lake, Minnesota, USA
6	(Finland)	Heikki Peipinen	D	L	2006-04-10	5'11"	190	Oulu, Finland
5	(United States)	Will Sinclair	D	R	2004-05-18	6'1"	185	Erie, Pennsylvania, USA
17	(Latvia)	Emils Skeltins	D	R	2005-02-08	6'4"	190	Iecava, Latvia
7	(United States)	Connor Watson	D	L	2007-10-26	6'1"	185	Weymouth, Massachusetts, USA
2	(United States)	Will Wellburn	D	R	2004-05-26	6'9"	240	Rye, New York, USA
93	(United States)	Padraic Whited	D	L	2005-07-19	6'0"	195	Helena, Montana, USA
1	(Canada)	Charles-Antoine Girard	G	L	2006-02-07	6'4"	180	Deux-Montagnes, Quebec, Canada
35	(United States)	Charlie Zolin	G	L	2004-07-19	6'2"	185	Greenwich, Connecticut, USA

=== Team captains ===
- Eric Trax: 2003–04 Lone Star Cavalry
- Andrew Johnson: 2004–05 Santa Fe RoadRunners
- Brandon Vossberg: 2005–06 Santa Fe RoadRunners
- John Stoddard: 2006–07 Santa Fe RoadRunners and 2007–08 Topeka RoadRunners
- Matt Hartmann: 2008–09 Topeka RoadRunners
- Kurtis Anton: 2009–10 Topeka RoadRunners
- Michael Hill / Jordan Davis: 2010–11 Topeka RoadRunners
- Chris Bond: 2011–12 Topeka RoadRunners
- Drew Kariofiles: 2012–13 Topeka RoadRunners
- Jared Tafoya: 2013–14 Topeka RoadRunners
- Mike Gornall: 2014–15 Topeka RoadRunners
- Cam Strong / Dominic Lutz: 2015–16 Topeka RoadRunners
- Marshall Bowery: 2016–17 Topeka RoadRunners
- Nick Granowicz / Jake Rosenbaum / Nigel Nelson: 2017–18 Topeka RoadRunners
- Brenden Rons: 2018–19 Topeka Pilots
- Austin McCarthy: 2019-20 Topeka Pilots

=== Honored members ===
Retired numbers: The Topeka RoadRunners retired two numbers: the 11 of forward and team captain John Stoddard, and the 21 of Peter Halash.

On January 6, 2014, Topeka Roadrunner Peter Halash died in a car wreck. The Roadrunners team had a jersey retirement ceremony before a game against the Springfield Jr. Blues on March 23, 2014.

=== Alumni ===
The RoadRunners have had a number of alumni move on to NCAA Division I, NCAA Division III, ACHA Division I and II, higher levels of junior ice hockey, and professional ice hockey, including:

- Eriah Hayes (2007–08, Topeka RoadRunners) – Played 19 games for the San Jose Sharks of the NHL
- Cole Schneider (2009–10, Topeka RoadRunners) – Played for the Buffalo Sabres in the NHL and for the Binghamton Senators, Rochester Americans, and Hartford Wolf Pack in the AHL.
- Jakub Dobeš (2018–20) – Goaltender for the Montreal Canadiens in the NHL.
