= 2003–04 NAHL season =

- League: North American Hockey League
- Sport: Ice hockey
- Duration: Regular season September 2003 – March 2004; Postseason; March 25 – May 2, 2004
- Games: 56, 24
- Teams: 21

Regular season
- Season champions: Texas Tornado
- Season MVP: Not awarded
- Top scorer: Mike Ruberto (Cleveland Jr. Barons)

Robertson Cup Playoffs
- Finals champions: Texas Tornado
- Runners-up: Bismarck Bobcats

NAHL seasons
- ← 2002–03 2004–05 →

The 2003–04 NAHL season was the 20th season of the North American Hockey League. The season ran from September 2003 to April 2004 with a 56-game schedule for each team. The Texas Tornado won the regular season championship and went on to defeat the Bismarck Bobcats 4 to 1 for the Robertson Cup.

== Member changes ==
- After the previous season, several of the NAHL's active teams folded. These included the Capital Centre Pride, Chicago Freeze and Detroit Compuware Ambassadors.
- The league was further reduced by the loss of the Danville Wings to the United States Hockey League.
- The Pittsburgh Forge also relocated and became the Toledo IceDiggers.
- Over the course of 2003, the NAHL and America West Hockey League negotiated a merger between the two leagues. The new combined league would remain the 'North American Hockey League' and include eight of the eleven AWHL franchises that were active in its final season. These teams were the Billings Bulls, Bismarck Bobcats, Bozeman IceDogs, Fairbanks Ice Dogs, Fernie Ghostriders, Helena Bighorns, Central Texas Blackhawks and Wichita Falls Rustlers.
- The league also added six expansion franchises for this season. The new squads were the Dayton Gems, Fargo-Moorhead Jets, Lone Star Cavalry, Minnesota Blizzard, Texarkana Bandits and Youngstown Phantoms.
- After playing just 21 games during the season, the Dayton Gems suspended operations. The club forfeited their next 3 matches before withdrawing from the league and folding.

== Regular season ==
The standings at the end of the regular season were as follows:

Note: x = clinched playoff berth; y = clinched division title; z = clinched regular season title

=== Standings ===
==== North Division ====
Team	GP	W	L	OTL	Pts	GF	GA
xy – Soo Indians	56	44	6	6	94	213	115
x – Springfield Jr. Blues	56	34	18	4	72	194	143
x – Cleveland Jr. Barons	56	31	20	5	67	192	179
x – USNTDP	56	28	21	7	63	199	174
Youngstown Phantoms	56	28	21	7	63	168	169
Toledo IceDiggers	56	13	38	5	31	146	243
Dayton Gems	24	7	16	1	15	63	110

==== South Division ====
Team	GP	W	L	OTL	Pts	GF	GA
xyz – Texas Tornado	56	48	6	2	98	276	123
x – Fairbanks Ice Dogs	56	31	15	10	72	174	140
x – Wichita Falls Rustlers	56	29	20	7	65	200	172
x – Texarkana Bandits	56	30	24	2	62	167	181
Lone Star Cavalry	56	28	22	6	62	158	171
Central Texas Blackhawks	56	19	30	7	45	161	219
Springfield Spirit	56	13	39	4	30	153	259

==== West Division ====
Team	GP	W	L	OTL	Pts	GF	GA
xy – Billings Bulls	56	40	14	2	82	224	143
x – Fargo-Moorhead Jets	56	33	21	2	68	187	160
x – Bismarck Bobcats	56	30	22	4	64	184	184
x – Helena Bighorns	56	28	22	6	62	205	191
Bozeman IceDogs	56	28	22	6	62	174	163
Minnesota Blizzard	56	20	28	8	48	148	209
Fernie Ghostriders	56	12	38	6	30	146	270

=== Statistics ===
==== Scoring leaders ====
The following players led the league in regular season points at the completion of all regular season games.

Player	Team	GP	G	A	Pts	PIM
Mike Ruberto	Cleveland Jr. Barons	56	39	33	72	66
Logan Bittle	Soo Indians	53	34	37	71	70
Brian Bicek	Cleveland Jr. Barons	56	26	45	71	91
Stavros Paskaris	Soo Indians	55	30	38	68	35
Luke Flicek	Texas Tornado	55	23	42	65	41
Brad Cooper	Texas Tornado	56	26	37	63	34
Vince Goulet	Texas Tornado	54	28	33	61	197
Mark Agnew	Fargo-Moorhead Jets	55	17	44	61	51
Jake Bluhm	Fairbanks Ice Dogs	52	28	31	59	91
Tim Hartung	Lone Star Cavalry	52	17	41	58	40

== Robertson Cup playoffs ==
Four teams qualified for the Round Robin semifinal, the host (Texas) and the four division champions. If Texas won the South division final, the runner-up would receive the final qualifying spot. For the round robin semifinal, ties were broken first by head-to-head matchup and then by goal differential.

Division Semifinals (Best-of-5)
N1	Soo Indians	3	2	3	1	-
N4	USNTDP	1	3*	4*	7	-
North Division
N2	Springfield Jr. Blues	2	9	2	4	4
N3	Cleveland Jr. Barons	1	4	5	7	2
S1	Texas Tornado	3	3	5	-	-
S4	Texarkana Bandits	1	2	1	-	-
South Division
S2	Fairbanks Ice Dogs	1	3	2*	5	-
S3	Wichita Falls Rustlers	2*	1	1	2	-
W1	Billings Bulls	3	2	3	7	-
W4	Helena Bighorns	0	5	2	0	-
West Division
W2	Fargo-Moorhead Jets	2	3	1	-	-
W3	Bismarck Bobcats	7	4	3	-	-

Division Finals (Best-of-5)
N4	USNTDP	1	1	4	-	-
N2	Springfield Jr. Blues	3	5	5*	-	-
S1	Texas Tornado	3	4	7	-	-
S2	Fairbanks Ice Dogs	2	1	1	-	-
W1	Billings Bulls	0	4	2	0	-
W3	Bismarck Bobcats	4	0	3	5	-

Semifinal (Round Robin)
N2	Springfield Jr. Blues	-	5	2	0
S2	Fairbanks Ice Dogs	2	-	2	1
W3	Bismarck Bobcats	3	3	-	3
H	Texas Tornado	1	2	8	-

Championship (Best-of-1)
H	Texas Tornado	4
W3	Bismarck Bobcats	1
Consolation Game
N2	Springfield Jr. Blues	5
S2	Fairbanks Ice Dogs	3

Note: * denotes overtime period(s)
