= Helena Bighorns (NAHL) =

- City: Helena, Montana
- League: North American Hockey League
- Division: West
- Founded: 2001
- Folded: 2006
- Home arena: Helena Ice Arena
- Colors: Blue, silver and white

Franchise history
- 2001–06: Helena Bighorns

The Helena Bighorns were a Tier II junior ice hockey team that played in the North American Hockey League (NAHL).

== History ==
In 2001, the Helena Bighorns were founded as an expansion franchise in the America West Hockey League. After its second season, the AWHL merged with the North American Hockey League and the Bighorns were one of eight teams that were transferred. The team saw a modest amount of success over the next three years, however, in 2006, the Bighorns ran into problems. That offseason, the team nearest rivals, the Billings Bulls and the Bozeman IceDogs, announced that they would be withdrawing from the league to join the Northern Pacific Hockey League. Helena attempted to make the same move, however, they were blocked by the existence of the Queen City Cutthroats, a NorPac team already in Helena, Montana. with the team unable to continue in the NAHL, the Bighorns folded that summer.

After the original Bighorns dissolved, the Queen City Cutthroats assumed their identity. The team changed their name and colors to match, becoming the new Helena Bighorns.

== Season-by-season records ==
Season	GP	W	L	OTL	Pts	GF	GA	Finish	Playoffs
AWHL
2001–02	56	27	24	5	59	218	197	7th of 9, AWHL	Missing information
2002–03	56	29	26	1	59	247	207	4th of 7, North; 6th of 11, AWHL	Missing information
NAHL
2003–04	56	28	22	6	62	205	191	t-4th of 7, West t-12th of 21, NAHL	Lost Div. Semifinal series, 1–3 (Billings Bulls)
2004–05	56	33	19	4	70	203	168	3rd of 6, West; 8th of 19, NAHL	Lost Div. Semifinal series, 0–3 (Billings Bulls)
2005–06	56	17	35	6	40	186	246	5th of 5, West; 18th of 20, NAHL	Did not qualify
