= 2004–05 NAHL season =

- League: North American Hockey League
- Sport: Ice hockey
- Duration: Regular season September 2004 – March 2005; Postseason; April 1 – April 30, 2005
- Games: 56
- Teams: 19

Regular season
- Season champions: Texas Tornado
- Season MVP: Jason Kearney (Texarkana/Soo)
- Top scorer: Brad Cooper (Texas Tornado)

Robertson Cup Playoffs
- Finals champions: Texas Tornado
- Runners-up: Fargo-Moorhead Jets

NAHL seasons
- ← 2003–04 2005–06 →

The 2004–05 NAHL season was the 21st season of the North American Hockey League. The regular season ran from September 2004 to March 2005 with a 56-game schedule for each team. The Texas Tornado won the regular season championship and went on to defeat the Fargo-Moorhead Jets 6 to 1 for the Robertson Cup.

== Member changes ==
- The Lone Star Cavalry relocated and became the Santa Fe Roadrunners.
- The Central Texas Blackhawks rebranded as the Central Texas Marshals.
- The Fernie Ghostriders, left the league and joined the KIJHL.

== Regular season ==
The standings at the end of the regular season were as follows:

Note: x = clinched playoff berth; y = clinched division title; z = clinched regular season title

=== Standings ===
==== North Division ====
Team	GP	W	L	OTL	Pts	GF	GA
xy – Team USA	56	37	17	2	76	214	164
x – Soo Indians	56	33	18	5	71	170	141
x – Youngstown Phantoms	56	27	25	4	58	201	181
x – Fairbanks Ice Dogs	56	26	24	6	58	164	179
Cleveland Jr. Barons	56	27	26	3	57	185	178
Toledo IceDiggers	56	18	35	3	39	149	234

==== South Division ====
Team	GP	W	L	OTL	Pts	GF	GA
xyz – Texas Tornado	56	42	13	1	85	226	120
x – Texarkana Bandits	56	36	15	5	77	218	153
x – Santa Fe RoadRunners	56	33	18	5	71	201	163
x – Wichita Falls Wildcats	56	28	21	7	63	206	218
Springfield Jr. Blues	56	30	25	1	61	207	200
Springfield Spirit	56	20	29	7	47	144	188
Central Texas Marshals	56	11	42	3	25	112	256

==== West Division ====
Team	GP	W	L	OTL	Pts	GF	GA
xy – Fargo-Moorhead Jets	56	36	17	3	75	222	148
x – Billings Bulls	56	33	17	6	72	194	170
x – Helena Bighorns	56	33	19	4	70	203	168
x – Minnesota Blizzard	56	28	24	4	60	159	198
Bismarck Bobcats	56	25	22	9	59	165	172
Bozeman IceDogs	56	20	31	5	45	165	186

=== Statistics ===
==== Scoring leaders ====
The following players led the league in regular season points at the completion of all regular season games.

Player	Team	GP	G	A	Pts	PIM
Brad Cooper	Texas Tornado	54	27	59	86	28
Karl Sellan	Texas Tornado	54	43	40	83	90
Kevin Huck	Wichita Falls Wildcats	54	23	54	77	36
Pat Lee	Springfield Jr. Blues	51	31	38	69	122
Rob Rassey	Youngstown Phantoms	54	28	41	69	18
Tom Train	Texas Tornado	53	31	35	66	143
Aaron Rhyner	Youngstown Phantoms	53	31	31	62	48
Chad Costello	Wichita Falls Wildcats	54	29	32	61	22
Kyle Kraemer	Wichita Falls Wildcats	51	27	32	59	84
Brian Kaufman	Billings Bulls	52	29	30	59	38

==== Leading goaltenders ====
Note: GP = Games played; Mins = Minutes played; W = Wins; L = Losses; OTL = Overtime losses; SOL = Shootout losses; SO = Shutouts; GAA = Goals against average; SV% = Save percentage

Player	Team	GP	Mins	W	L	OTL	SOL	GA	SO	SV	SV%	GAA
Jason Kearney	Texarkana/Soo	37	2034:17	23	8	0	3	63	6	758	.917	1.86
Ben Bishop	Texas Tornado	44	2517:13	34	8	0	0	82	5	992	.917	1.96
Andrew Stricker	Fargo-Moorhead Jets	34	1962:04	22	9	1	0	74	2	874	.915	2.26
Riley Gill	Texarkana Bandits	42	2473:10	25	11	4	1	107	5	1,135	.906	2.60
Brett Bennett	Team USA	21	1096:42	9	6	0	1	50	1	608	.918	2.74

== Robertson Cup playoffs ==
Four teams qualified for the Round Robin semifinal, the host (Bismarck) and the four division champions. If Bismarck won the West division final, the runner-up would receive the final qualifying spot. For the round robin semifinal, ties were broken first by head-to-head matchup and then by goal differential.

Division Semifinals (Best-of-5)
N1	Team USA	4	2	5	-	-
N4	Fairbanks Ice Dogs	2	1	0	-	-
North Division
N2	Soo Indians	5	4*	4*	-	-
N3	Youngstown Phantoms	2	3	3	-	-
S1	Texas Tornado	9	8	7	-	-
S4	Wichita Falls Wildcats	5	6	3	-	-
South Division
S2	Texarkana Bandits	5	0	5	5*	-
S3	Santa Fe Roadrunners	2	3	1	4	-
W1	Fargo-Moorhead Jets	3	2	3	-	-
W4	Minnesota Blizzard	0	1	2	-	-
West Division
W2	Billings Bulls	6*	6	2*	-	-
W3	Helena Bighorns	5	2	1	-	-

Division Finals (Best-of-5)
N1	Team USA	5	2	2	0	4	2	4
N2	Soo Indians	4	0	3	3	5*	0	2
S1	Texas Tornado	3	4	4	2	4	-	-
S2	Texarkana Bandits	2	1	1	4	2	-	-
W1	Fargo-Moorhead Jets	7	7	5	5	-	-	-
W2	Billings Bulls	6	3	2	1	-	-	-

Semifinal (Round Robin)
N2	Soo Indians	-	1	2	3
S1	Texas Tornado	4	-	4	4
W1	Fargo-Moorhead Jets	8	1	-	3
H	Bismarck Bobcats	1	1	0	-

Championship (Best-of-1)
S1	Texas Tornado	6
W1	Fargo-Moorhead Jets	1
Consolation Game
N2	Soo Indians	5
H	Bismarck Bobcats	2

Note: * denotes overtime period(s)
Note: Despite winning their Division Final, Team USA was unavailable for the Semifinal round. Instead, the Soo Indians, as runners-up, advanced to the Round Robin.
