= Dayton Gems (NAHL) =

- City: Dayton, Ohio
- League: North American Hockey League
- Division: South Division
- Founded: 2003
- Folded: 2003
- Home arena: Gem City Arena
- Colors: Blue, silver and black
- Head coach: Mark Frankenfield

Franchise history
- 2003: Dayton Gems

The Dayton Gems were a Tier II junior ice hockey team that played in the North American Hockey League (NAHL).

== History ==
The Dayton Gems were one of six expansion franchises added to the NAHL in 2003 alongside eight clubs that joined due to the merger with the America West Hockey League. Dayton ended up getting lost in the shuffle and ran into problems part way through the year. After just 21 games, the team suspended operations when they lost access to their home arena. After forfeiting three subsequent games the club withdrew from the league and was formally dissolved.

== Season-by-season records ==
Season	GP	W	L	OTL	Pts	GF	GA	Finish	Playoffs
2003–04	24	7	16	1	15	63	110	7th of 7, North; 21st of 21, NAHL	Withdrew from league
