= Wichita Falls Wildcats =

- City: Wichita Falls, Texas
- League: NAHL
- Division: South
- Founded: 1993 (In the AFHL)
- Home arena: Kay Yeager Coliseum
- Colors: Black, Red, and White
- Owners: Roy Davoult, Alex Shnayderman
- General manager: Paul Baxter
- Head coach: Josh Nelson (interim)
- Media: YouTube, FASTHockey

Franchise history
- 1993–1996: Vail Avalanche
- 1996–2002: Butte Irish
- 2002–2004: Wichita Falls Rustlers
- 2004–2017: Wichita Falls Wildcats

The Wichita Falls Wildcats were a Tier II junior ice hockey team in the North American Hockey League's South Division. The Wildcats played out of the 7,380-seat Kay Yeager Coliseum in Wichita Falls, Texas. After failing to find a buyer, the Wildcats ceased operations for the 2017–18 season.

== History ==
Previously known as the Wichita Falls Rustlers (and before this, the Butte Irish of Butte, Montana and the Vail Avalanche of Vail, Colorado), the franchise was a part of the American Frontier/America West Hockey League prior to 2003, and became an NAHL team after the two leagues merged for the 2003–04 season. The Irish, Rustlers, and Wildcats are technically three separate franchises, but with a major overlap of players and coaches between the organizations, they are often listed together as one.

After 13 seasons as the Wildcats, ownership had been trying to sell the franchise to keep it in Wichita Falls during the 2016–17 season. After failing to find a buyer, they announced they would not be operating the team in the 2017–18 season.

In 2018, there was an attempt to bring junior hockey back to Wichita Falls with the Wichita Falls Force, a team in the USA Central Hockey League, but the entire league folded after only six weeks of operation. The NAHL later announced a Wichita Falls expansion team for the 2020–21 season.

== Season-by-season records ==
Season	GP	W	L	OTL	PTS	GF	GA	PIM	Finish	Playoffs	Avg Attend
Vail Avalanche (AFHL)
1993–94	Statistics unavailable										
1994–95	Statistics unavailable								League champions		
1995–96	Statistics unavailable										
Butte Irish (AFHL)
1996–97	60	38	17	5	81	264	181	N/A	2nd	Lost in finals	
1997–98	60	25	33	2	52	229	264	N/A	6th	Did not qualify	
Butte Irish (AWHL)
1998–99	60	32	23	5	69	224	238	N/A	3rd	Lost in semifinals	
1999–00	58	23	32	3	49	205	263	1,283	6th	Lost in 1st round	
2000–01	60	6	51	3	15	166	345	1,969	8th	Lost in 1st round	
2001–02	56	21	28	7	49	214	240	N/A	8th	Lost in 1st round	
Wichita Falls Rustlers (AWHL)
2002–03	56	43	11	2	88	215	115	1,255	1st, South	Lost in semifinals	
Wichita Falls Rustlers (NAHL)
2003–04	56	29	20	7	65	200	172	1,039	3rd of 7, South; 8th of 21, NAHL	Lost Div. Semifinal series, 1–3 (Fairbanks Ice Dogs)	
Wichita Falls Wildcats (NAHL)
2004–05	56	28	21	7	63	206	218	1,163	4th of 7, South; 9th of 19, NAHL	Lost Div. Semifinal series, 0–3 (Texas Tornado)	1,948
2005–06	58	26	28	4	56	171	189	1,045	4th of 5, South; 12th of 20, NAHL	Lost Div. Semifinal series, 2–3 (Texas Tornado)	1,987
2006–07	62	22	34	6	50	175	227	1,126	5th of 6, South; 15th of 17, NAHL	Did not qualify	1,872
2007–08	58	38	18	2	78	221	181	1,715	3rd of 6, South; 5th of 18, NAHL	Lost Div. Semifinal series, 1–3 (Fairbanks Ice Dogs)	1,890
2008–09	58	24	25	9	57	163	203	1,695	3rd of 4, South; 14th of 19, NAHL	Lost Div. Semifinal series, 2–3 (Topeka RoadRunners)	1,826
2009–10	58	18	34	6	42	175	251	1,530	5th of 5, South; 17th of 19, NAHL	Did not qualify	1,907
2010–11	58	26	27	5	57	189	190	1,527	4th of 6, South; 18th of 26, NAHL	Lost Div. Semifinal series, 2–3 (Topeka RoadRunners)	1,894
2011–12	60	20	35	5	45	149	204	1.134	6th of 7, South; 22nd of 28, NAHL	Did not qualify	2,038
2012–13	60	26	30	4	56	183	200	955	5th of 6, South t-16th of 24, NAHL	Did not qualify	1,895
2013–14	60	31	25	4	66	170	157	1,170	4th of 7, South t-12th of 24, NAHL	Lost Div. Semifinal series, 0–3 (Amarillo Bulls)	1,506
2014–15	60	39	16	5	83	242	182	858	3rd of 8, South; 7th of 24, NAHL	Won Play-in series, 2–0 (Rio Grande Valley Killer Bees); Lost Div. Semifinal series, 1–3 (Topeka RoadRunners)	1,593
2015–16	60	44	11	5	93	224	141	1,093	1st of 6, South; 2nd of 22, NAHL	Won Div. Semifinal series, 3–0 (Odessa Jackalopes); Won Div. Final series, 3–0 (Topeka RoadRunners); Won Robertson Cup Semifinal series, 2–0 (Bismarck Bobcats); Lost Robertson Cup Championship, 0–2 (Fairbanks Ice Dogs)	1,659
2016–17	60	29	24	7	65	187	203	1,672	4th of 7, South t-12th of 24, NAHL	Lost Div. Semifinals, 0–3 (Lone Star Brahmas)	1,086

== Notable alumni ==
- Andrew Conboy – drafted by the Montreal Canadiens (NHL) in 2007
- Chad Costello – ECHL Most Valuable Player in 2011–12, 2015–16, and 2016–17.
- Evan Cowley – drafted by Florida Panthers (NHL) in 2013
- Cal Heeter – played one game with the Philadelphia Flyers (NHL)
- Tucker Poolman – drafted by the Winnipeg Jets (NHL) in 2013
- Dan Sexton – played for the Anaheim Ducks (NHL) and several teams in the Kontinental Hockey League
- Zach Trotman – drafted by the Boston Bruins (NHL) in 2010; has played for the Bruins and Pittsburgh Penguins
