= Central Texas Marshals =

- City: Belton, Texas
- League: North American Hockey League
- Division: South
- Founded: 2002
- Folded: 2005
- Home arena: Bell County Expo Center
- Colors: Blue, red and silver

Franchise history
- 2002–04: Central Texas Blackhawks
- 2004–05: Central Texas Marshals

The Central Texas Marshals were a Tier II junior ice hockey team that played in the North American Hockey League (NAHL).

== History ==
Central Texas Blackhawks logo

In 2002, the America West Hockey League added the Central Texas Blackhawks as an expansion franchise. The team played out of the Bell County Expo Center in Belton, Texas. After the team's first season, the AWHL merged with the North American Hockey League. The Blackhawks were one of eight members to join the NAHL. One year later, the franchise rebranded as the 'Central Texas Marshals'. For their third season, the Marshals finished dead last in the league and then folded after the season.

== Season-by-season records ==
| Season | GP | W | L | OTL | Pts | GF | GA | Finish | Playoffs |
|---|---|---|---|---|---|---|---|---|---|
AWHL
Central Texas Blackhawks
| 2002–03 | 56 | 39 | 13 | 4 | 82 | 236 | 133 | 2nd of 4, South; 2nd of 11, AWHL | Missing information |
NAHL
| 2003–04 | 56 | 19 | 30 | 7 | 45 | 161 | 219 | 6th of 7, South; 17th of 21, NAHL | Did not qualify |
Central Texas Marshals
| 2004–05 | 56 | 11 | 42 | 3 | 25 | 112 | 256 | 7th of 7, South; 19th of 19, NAHL | Did not qualify |
