= List of NAHL seasons =

This is a list of seasons of the North American Hockey League since the foundation of its immediate predecessor, the Great Lakes Junior Hockey League, in 1975

== List of seasons ==
=== GLJHL ===
No.	Season	No. of teams	Reg. season games	Start (reg. season)	Finish (incl. playoffs)	Regular Season Champion	Robertson Cup Champion
1	1975–76	5 (Note: The GLJHL was founded by the merger of the Michigan Junior Hockey League and the Wolverine Junior A Hockey League)	48			Detroit Little Caesars (35–11–2)	Detroit Little Caesars
2	1976–77	5	48–46			Paddock Pool Saints (33–7–6)	Paddock Pool Saints
3	1977–78	5	49–46			Paddock Pool Saints (37–9–3)	Paddock Pool Saints
4	1978–79	6 (Note: The Cleveland Jr. Barons withdrew from the league mid-season)	50–29			Paddock Pool Saints (42–5–3)	Paddock Pool Saints
5	1979–80	5	46–45			Paddock Pool Saints (32–11–3)	Paddock Pool Saints
6	1980–81	3 (Note: Games against non-member teams were included in league standings)	53–54			Paddock Pool Saints (39–10–4)	Paddock Pool Saints
7	1981–82	5	46			Paddock Pool Saints (33–9–4)	Paddock Pool Saints
8	1982–83	5	45			Paddock Pool Saints (29–11–5)	Paddock Pool Saints
9	1983–84	5	50			Buffalo Jr. Sabres (29–13–8)	St. Clair Shores Falcons

=== NAJHL / NAHL ===
No.	Season	No. of teams	Reg. season games	Start (reg. season)	Finish (incl. playoffs)	Regular Season Champion	Robertson Cup Champion
10	1984–85	3 (Note: The GLJHL collapsed after three of its five member teams folded. The remaining clubs reformed as the North American Junior Hockey League)	24			St. Clair Shores Falcons (11–7–6)	St. Clair Shores Falcons
11	1985–86	4 (Note: The Buffalo Jr. Sabres, who were also members of the Golden Horseshoe Junior Hockey League, played a partial schedule of 24 games)	43–24			St. Clair Shores Falcons (28–12–3)	Detroit Compuware Ambassadors
12	1986–87	5* (Note: The Chicago Patriots and Chicago Cougars joined the league as affiliate members, neither team were active by the end of the season)	37–3			Detroit Compuware Ambassadors (24–8–6)	Detroit Compuware Ambassadors
13	1987–88	6	32			Detroit Compuware Ambassadors (24–5–3)	Detroit Compuware Ambassadors
14	1988–89	8	40			Detroit Compuware Ambassadors (30–8–2)	Detroit Compuware Ambassadors
15	1989–90	8	44			Detroit Compuware Ambassadors (42–0–2)	Detroit Compuware Ambassadors
16	1990–91	8	40			Detroit Compuware Ambassadors (30–5–5)	Kalamazoo Jr. Wings
17	1991–92	8	40			Detroit Compuware Ambassadors (29–8–3–2)	Detroit Compuware Ambassadors
18	1992–93 (Note: The league rebranded as the North American Hockey League)	8	40			Kalamazoo Jr. Wings (31–6–3–0)	Kalamazoo Jr. Wings
19	1993–94	10	46			Niagara Scenic (27–11–6–2)	Detroit Compuware Ambassadors
20	1994–95	9	44			Detroit Compuware Ambassadors (36–6–2–0)	Detroit Compuware Ambassadors
21	1995–96	8	46			Springfield Jr. Blues (34–7–4–1)	Springfield Jr. Blues
22	1996–97	8	46		April 27	Springfield Jr. Blues (35–10–1)	Springfield Jr. Blues
23	1997–98	8	56		April 24	Springfield Jr. Blues (42–12–2)	Detroit Compuware Ambassadors
24	1998–99	9	56		April 19	Detroit Compuware Ambassadors (39–11–6)	Detroit Compuware Ambassadors
25	1999–2000	11	56		April 28	Texas Tornado (42–12–2)	Danville Wings
26	2000–01	10	56		April 27	Soo Indians (42–11–3)	Texas Tornado
27	2001–02	11	56		April 27	Detroit Compuware Ambassadors (42–9–5)	Detroit Compuware Ambassadors
28	2002–03	11	56		April 25	Pittsburgh Forge (43–9–4)	Pittsburgh Forge
29	2003–04	21 (Note: The NAHL merged with the America West Hockey League, absorbing eight of the AWHL's members)	56, 24 (Note: The Dayton Gems folded after 24 games)		May 2	Texas Tornado (48–6–2)	Texas Tornado
30	2004–05	19	56		April 30	Texas Tornado (42–13–1)	Texas Tornado
31	2005–06	20	58	September 9	May 13	Bozeman IceDogs (48–9–1)	Texas Tornado
32	2006–07	17	62	September 13	May 6	Mahoning Valley Phantoms (47–14–1)	St. Louis Bandits
33	2007–08	18	58	September 14	May 5	St. Louis Bandits (47–9–2)	St. Louis Bandits
34	2008–09	19	58	September 17	May 3	St. Louis Bandits (42–9–7)	St. Louis Bandits
35	2009–10	19	58	September 11	May 9	Wenatchee Wild (45–10–3)	Bismarck Bobcats
36	2010–11	26	58	September 10	May 7	Topeka RoadRunners (43–12–3)	Fairbanks Ice Dogs
37	2011–12	28	60	September 9	May 8	Amarillo Bulls (46–7–7)	Texas Tornado
38	2012–13	24	60	September 8	May 13	Amarillo Bulls (46–7–7)	Amarillo Bulls
39	2013–14	24	60	September 13	May 10	Fairbanks Ice Dogs (45–14–1)	Fairbanks Ice Dogs
40	2014–15	24	60	September 12	May 16	Janesville Jets (49–9–2)	Minnesota Wilderness
41	2015–16	22	60	September 11	May 15	Fairbanks Ice Dogs (49–8–3)	Fairbanks Ice Dogs
42	2016–17	24	60	September 9	May 14	Aston Rebels (46–11–2–1)	Lone Star Brahmas
43	2017–18	23	60	September 13	May 14	Fairbanks Ice Dogs (45–8–4–3)	Shreveport Mudbugs
44	2018–19	24	60	September 13	May 14	Johnstown Tomahawks (47–9–3–1)	Aberdeen Wings
45	2019–20	23	60 (Note: The league suspended play on March 12 and later cancelled the entire postseason)	September 13	March 12	Lone Star Brahmas (42–9–1–1)	Postseason cancelled due to COVID-19
46	2020–21	23	60–48 (Note: Due to the ongoing pandemic, the season began later than normal and finished with an unbalanced schedule)	October 9	June 22	Aberdeen Wings (51–4–0–1)	Shreveport Mudbugs
47	2021–22	29	60	September 8	May 24	Lone Star Brahmas (38–12–5–5)	New Jersey Titans
48	2022–23	29	60	September 9	May 21	Oklahoma Warriors (44–14–1–1)	Oklahoma Warriors
49	2023–24	32	60	September 8	May 21	Lone Star Brahmas (44–10–3–3)	Lone Star Brahmas
50	2024–25	35	59	September 13	May 20	Bismarck Bobcats (47–10–1–1)	Bismarck Bobcats
