= Chris Tamer =

American ice hockey player (born 1970)

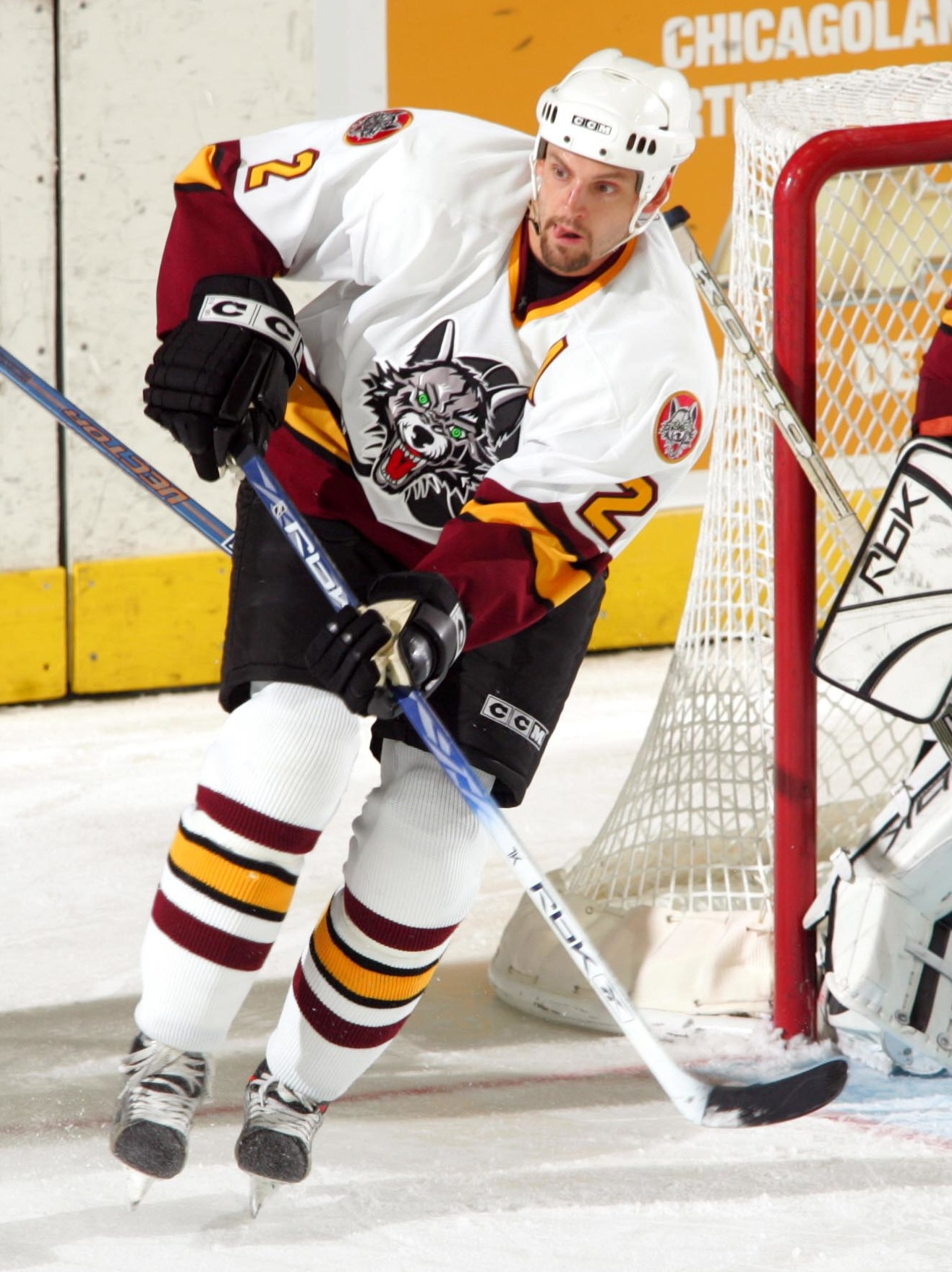
- Tamer with the Chicago Wolves in 2005
- Born: November 17, 1970 (age 55) Dearborn, Michigan, U.S.
- Height: 6 ft 2 in (188 cm)
- Weight: 212 lb (96 kg; 15 st 2 lb)
- Position: Defense
- Shot: Left
- Played for: Pittsburgh Penguins; New York Rangers; Atlanta Thrashers
- National team: United States
- NHL draft: 68th overall, 1990; Pittsburgh Penguins
- Playing career: 1993–2006

Christopher Thomas Tamer (born November 17, 1970) is an American former professional ice hockey defenseman who played in the National Hockey League (NHL) with the Pittsburgh Penguins, New York Rangers, and Atlanta Thrashers.

== Hockey career ==
As a youth, Tamer played in the 1983 Quebec International Pee-Wee Hockey Tournament with the Michigan Dynamos minor ice hockey team from.

After playing two years in the junior league, Tamer was drafted by the Pittsburgh Penguins in the 4th round, 68th overall. Upon being drafted Tamer played for the University of Michigan for four years where he established himself as a strong defenseman and hard hitter. After college, he reported to the Penguins minor league affiliate Cleveland Lumberjacks for the 1993–1994 season. That season he also made his debut with the Penguins, playing in 12 games. After another year split between the Penguins and the Lumberjacks Tamer played with the Penguins full-time for another three years. Shortly into the 1998–1999 season Tamer was traded to the New York Rangers. Following that season the newly formed Atlanta Thrashers picked up Tamer in the 1999 NHL Expansion Draft. He played with the Thrashers for five years, providing veteran experience for the young team. He enjoyed the best season of his career during the 2000–2001 season, scoring 17 points and playing all 82 games in the season, the only time he played the full 82 game schedule. For the 2005–2006 season Tamer played in 14 games with the Chicago Wolves before retiring.

In 2016, Tamer was named an assistant coach for Team USA at the 2016 IIHF Women's World Championship.

== Personal life ==
Tamer is married to Keely (née Libby) Tamer and they have three children together. Tamer is the owner of Crossfit Brighton.

== Career statistics ==
=== Regular season and playoffs ===
			Regular season					Playoffs
Season	Team	League	GP	G	A	Pts	PIM	GP	G	A	Pts	PIM
1987–88	Redford Royals	NAHL	40	10	20	30	217	—	—	—	—	—
1988–89	Redford Royals	NAHL	31	6	13	19	79	—	—	—	—	—
1989–90	University of Michigan	CCHA	42	2	7	9	147	—	—	—	—	—
1990–91	University of Michigan	CCHA	45	8	19	27	130	—	—	—	—	—
1991–92	University of Michigan	CCHA	43	4	15	19	125	—	—	—	—	—
1992–93	University of Michigan	CCHA	39	5	18	23	113	—	—	—	—	—
1993–94	Cleveland Lumberjacks	IHL	53	1	2	3	160	—	—	—	—	—
1993–94	Pittsburgh Penguins	NHL	12	0	0	0	9	5	0	0	0	2
1994–95	Cleveland Lumberjacks	IHL	48	4	10	14	204	—	—	—	—	—
1994–95	Pittsburgh Penguins	NHL	36	2	0	2	82	4	0	0	0	18
1995–96	Pittsburgh Penguins	NHL	70	4	10	14	153	18	0	7	7	24
1996–97	Pittsburgh Penguins	NHL	45	2	4	6	131	4	0	0	0	4
1997–98	Pittsburgh Penguins	NHL	79	0	7	7	181	6	0	1	1	4
1998–99	Pittsburgh Penguins	NHL	11	0	0	0	32	—	—	—	—	—
1998–99	New York Rangers	NHL	52	1	5	6	92	—	—	—	—	—
1999–2000	Atlanta Thrashers	NHL	69	2	8	10	91	—	—	—	—	—
2000–01	Atlanta Thrashers	NHL	82	4	13	17	128	—	—	—	—	—
2001–02	Atlanta Thrashers	NHL	78	3	3	6	111	—	—	—	—	—
2002–03	Atlanta Thrashers	NHL	72	1	9	10	118	—	—	—	—	—
2003–04	Atlanta Thrashers	NHL	38	2	5	7	55	—	—	—	—	—
2005–06	Chicago Wolves	AHL	14	0	3	3	16	—	—	—	—	—
NHL totals			644	21	64	85	1183	37	0	8	8	52

=== International ===
Year	Team	Event	GP	G	A	Pts	PIM
1999	United States	WC	6	1	0	1	8
2002	United States	WC	7	0	1	1	2
Senior totals			13	1	1	2	10
