= 1987–88 NAJHL season =

- League: North American Junior Hockey League
- Sport: Ice hockey
- Games: 32
- Teams: 6

Regular season
- Season champions: Detroit Compuware Ambassadors

Robertson Cup Playoffs
- Finals champions: Detroit Compuware Ambassadors

NAHL seasons
- ← 1986–87 1988–89 →

The 1987–88 NAJHL season was the fourth season of the North American Junior Hockey League. The Detroit Compuware Ambassadors won the regular season championship and the Robertson Cup.

== Member changes ==
- The Detroit Falcons folded.
- The Bloomfield Jets and Chicago Young Americans joined the league as expansion franchises.
- The Detroit Jr. Wings returned from hiatus and rejoined the league.
- The Buffalo Jr. Sabres returned from hiatus and rebranded as the Niagara Scenic.
- The Hennessey Engineers relocated and became the Redford Royals.

== Regular season ==
The standings at the end of the regular season were as follows:

Note: x = clinched playoff berth; y = clinched regular season title

=== Standings ===
Team	GP	W	L	T	Pts	GF	GA
xy – Detroit Compuware Ambassadors	32	24	5	3	51	212	99
x – Detroit Jr. Wings	32	16	9	7	39	182	133
x – Niagara Scenic	32	16	12	4	36	159	139
x – Redford Royals	32	14	12	6	34	160	150
Chicago Young Americans	32	14	13	5	33	144	121
Bloomfield Jets	32	5	27	0	10	103	243

== Robertson Cup playoffs ==
Results missing

Detroit Compuware Ambassadors won the Robertson Cup.
