= 1989–90 NAJHL season =

- League: North American Junior Hockey League
- Sport: Ice hockey
- Games: 44
- Teams: 8

Regular season
- Season champions: Detroit Compuware Ambassadors

Robertson Cup Playoffs
- Finals champions: Detroit Compuware Ambassadors

NAHL seasons
- ← 1988–89 1990–91 →

The 1989–90 NAJHL season was the sixth season of the North American Junior Hockey League. The Detroit Compuware Ambassadors won the regular season championship and the Robertson Cup.

== Member changes ==
- The Chicago Young Americans folded.
- The Indianapolis Junior Ice joined the league as an expansion franchise.
- The Redford Royals rebranded as NACE, C & H Piping rebranded as the Melvindale Blades and the Western Michigan Wolves rebranded as the Kalamazoo Jr. Wings.

== Regular season ==
The standings at the end of the regular season were as follows:

Note: x = clinched playoff berth; y = clinched division title; z = clinched regular season title

=== Standings ===
==== Eastern Division ====
Team	GP	W	L	T	Pts	GF	GA
xyz – Detroit Compuware Ambassadors	44	42	0	2	86	343	196
x – Detroit Jr. Wings	44	24	18	2	50	221	200
Niagara Scenic	44	20	17	7	47	192	215
Melvindale Blades	44	15	24	5	35	190	235

==== Western Division ====
Team	GP	W	L	T	Pts	GF	GA
xy – Kalamazoo Jr. Wings	44	27	11	6	60	256	197
x – NACE	44	16	19	9	41	207	225
Indianapolis Junior Ice	44	16	23	5	37	214	219
Bloomfield Jets	44	4	33	7	15	181	353

== Robertson Cup playoffs ==
Results missing

Detroit Compuware Ambassadors won the Robertson Cup.
