= Joby Messier =

Canadian ice hockey player

- Born: March 2, 1970 (age 56) Regina, Saskatchewan, Canada
- Height: 6 ft 1 in (185 cm)
- Weight: 200 lb (91 kg; 14 st 4 lb)
- Position: Defence
- Shot: Right
- Played for: New York Rangers
- NHL draft: 118th overall, 1989; New York Rangers
- Playing career: 1992–1998

Joby Messier (born March 2, 1970) is a Canadian former professional ice hockey player who played 25 games in the National Hockey League (NHL) for the New York Rangers between 1993 and 1995.

== Playing career ==
Joby Messier was a member of the Notre Dame Hounds of the Saskatchewan Junior Hockey League (SJHL) in 1987-88, playing 53 games and scoring 31 points. He also collected five points in five games during the 1988 Centennial Cup and was named a tournament All-Star.

Messier enrolled at Michigan State University, following in his older brother Mitch's footsteps. He played for the Spartans for four years and was a CCHA First Team All-Star selection in his senior year in 1991-92. After his sophomore year, Messier was selected by the New York Rangers in the 1989 NHL entry draft, 118th overall. During his time with the Spartans some of his teammates included Rod Brind'Amour, Kip Miller, Jason Woolley, Bryan Smolinski and Rem Murray.

Following the completion of his collegiate playing days, Messier joined the New York Rangers for eleven games in 1992-93. He also dressed for 60 games with the Binghamton Rangers of the American Hockey League (AHL), scoring five goals and 21 points. He played four more games with New York the following year, picking up two assists and was inserted into the lineup for ten games in 1994-95.

Messier was signed as a free agent by the New York Islanders on September 5, 1995, but missed the entire season recovering from a knee injury sustained in training camp. He then missed a good portion of the 1996-97 season recovering from an automobile accident on August 23, 1996.

The injury bug seemed to follow Messier wherever he went during his professional career. On November 8, 1997 he suffered a career-ending head injury while playing for the Long Beach Ice Dogs of the International Hockey League (IHL) in a game against Las Vegas.

In 25 NHL games with the Rangers, Messier had four assists and 24 minutes in penalties.

In 60 games playing for the Binghamton Rangers of the AHL, he had a +59, which is the plus/minus record in the American Hockey League (AHL). Joby accepted a full athletic scholarship Michigan State University 1988-1992 and was Captain of Michigan State University hockey team 1991-92. While still in high school; Joby was Assistant Captain of 1988 SJHL Centennial Cup Champions Notre Dame Hounds and was selected to the Centennial Cup All-Star Team 1987-1988. In 2013, the 1987-88 Notre Dame Hounds were inducted into the SJHL Hall of Fame.

== Personal life ==
Messier and his wife, Kim, have two children Max and Ashley, also a hockey player. Messier's brother Mitch also played in the NHL, and they are cousins of Mark Messier.

== Career statistics ==
=== Regular season and playoffs ===
			Regular season					Playoffs
Season	Team	League	GP	G	A	Pts	PIM	GP	G	A	Pts	PIM
1987–88	Notre Dame Hounds	SJHL	53	9	22	31	208	—	—	—	—	—
1988–89	Michigan State University	CCHA	39	2	10	12	70	—	—	—	—	—
1989–90	Michigan State University	CCHA	42	1	11	12	58	—	—	—	—	—
1990–91	Michigan State University	CCHA	39	5	11	16	71	—	—	—	—	—
1991–92	Michigan State University	CCHA	44	13	16	29	85	—	—	—	—	—
1992–93	New York Rangers	NHL	11	0	0	0	0	—	—	—	—	—
1992–93	Binghamton Rangers	AHL	60	5	16	21	63	14	1	1	2	6
1993–94	New York Rangers	NHL	4	0	2	2	0	—	—	—	—	—
1993–94	Binghamton Rangers	AHL	42	6	14	20	58	—	—	—	—	—
1994–95	New York Rangers	NHL	10	0	2	2	18	—	—	—	—	—
1994–95	Binghamton Rangers	AHL	25	2	9	11	36	1	0	0	0	0
1996–97	Utah Grizzlies	IHL	44	6	20	26	41	7	0	1	1	10
1997–98	Long Beach Ice Dogs	IHL	24	0	3	3	45	—	—	—	—	—
AHL totals			127	13	39	52	157	15	1	1	2	6
NHL totals			25	0	4	4	24	—	—	—	—	—

== Awards and honours ==
Award	Year
All-CCHA First Team	1991–92
AHCA West First-Team All-American	1991–92

Awards and achievements
Preceded by Karl Johnston	CCHA Best Defensive Defenseman; 1991-92	Succeeded by Bob Marshall
