= 1984–85 NAJHL season =

1984–85 NAHL season
- League: North American Junior Hockey League
- Sport: Ice hockey
- Games: 24
- Teams: 3

Regular season
- Season champions: St. Clair Shores Falcons

Robertson Cup Playoffs
- Finals champions: St. Clair Shores Falcons

NAHL seasons
- ← 1983–84 1985–86 →

The 1984–85 NAJHL season was the first season of the North American Junior Hockey League. The St. Clair Shores Falcons won the regular season championship and the Robertson Cup.

== New league ==
After losing three of five league members, the Great Lakes Junior Hockey League collapsed. The remaining two teams, the Buffalo Jr. Sabres and St. Clair Shores Falcons, banded together and reformed the league as the North American Junior Hockey League. The Robertson Cup, the championship trophy of the GLJHL, was transferred to the new league.

== Member changes ==
- The Detroit Compuware Ambassadors joined the league as an expansion franchise.

== Regular season ==
The standings at the end of the regular season were as follows:

Note: x = clinched playoff berth; y = clinched regular season title

=== Standings ===
Team	GP	W	L	T	Pts	GF	GA
xy – St. Clair Shores Falcons	24	11	7	6	28	117	113
x – Detroit Compuware Ambassadors	24	11	9	4	26	110	108
Buffalo Jr. Sabres	24	6	12	6	18	101	117

== Robertson Cup playoffs ==
Results missing

St. Clair Shores Falcons won the Robertson Cup.
