= 1985–86 NAJHL season =

- League: North American Junior Hockey League
- Sport: Ice hockey
- Games: 43, 24
- Teams: 4

Regular season
- Season champions: St. Clair Shores Falcons

Robertson Cup Playoffs
- Finals champions: Detroit Compuware Ambassadors

NAHL seasons
- ← 1984–85 1986–87 →

The 1985–86 NAJHL season was the second season of the North American Junior Hockey League. The St. Clair Shores Falcons won the regular season championship while the Detroit Compuware Ambassadors won the Robertson Cup.

== Member changes ==
- The Buffalo Jr. Sabres, who were also members of the Golden Horseshoe Junior Hockey League, played a limited schedule of only 24 games.
- The Hennessey Engineers joined the league as an expansion franchise.

== Regular season ==
The standings at the end of the regular season were as follows:

Note: x = clinched playoff berth; y = clinched regular season title

=== Standings ===
| Team | GP | W | L | T | Pts | GF | GA |
|---|---|---|---|---|---|---|---|
| xy – St. Clair Shores Falcons | 43 | 28 | 12 | 3 | 59 | 254 | 164 |
| x – Hennessey Engineers | 43 | 24 | 14 | 5 | 53 | 252 | 203 |
| x – Detroit Compuware Ambassadors | 43 | 17 | 20 | 6 | 40 | 194 | 224 |
| x – Buffalo Jr. Sabres | 24 | 6 | 14 | 4 | 16 | 110 | 238 |

Note: Buffalo played a partial season.

== Robertson Cup playoffs ==
Results missing

Detroit Compuware Ambassadors won the Robertson Cup.
