= 1983–84 GLJHL season =

- League: Great Lakes Junior Hockey League
- Sport: Ice hockey
- Games: 50
- Teams: 5

Regular season
- Season champions: Buffalo Jr. Sabres

Robertson Cup Playoffs
- Finals champions: St. Clair Shores Falcons

NAHL seasons
- ← 1982–83 1984–85 →

The 1983–84 GLJHL season was the ninth season of the Great Lakes Junior Hockey League. The Buffalo Jr. Sabres won the regular season championship while the St. Clair Shores Falcons won the Robertson Cup.

== Member changes ==
- The Buffalo Jr. Sabres and St. Clair Shores Falcons joined the league as expansion franchises.
- The Detroit Jr. Wings went on hiatus.
- The Melvindale Lakers folded.

== Regular season ==
The standings at the end of the regular season were as follows:

Note: x = clinched playoff berth; y = clinched regular season title

=== Standings ===
Team	GP	W	L	T	Pts	GF	GA
xy – Buffalo Jr. Sabres	50	29	13	8	66	–	–
x – Redford Royals	50	25	16	9	59	–	–
x – St. Clair Shores Falcons	50	22	23	5	49	–	–
x – Paddock Pool Saints	50	19	24	7	45	–	–
Fraser Flags	50	17	26	7	41	–	–

== Robertson Cup playoffs ==
Results missing

St. Clair Shores Falcons won the Robertson Cup.
