= 1988–89 NAJHL season =

- League: North American Junior Hockey League
- Sport: Ice hockey
- Games: 40
- Teams: 8

Regular season
- Season champions: Detroit Compuware Ambassadors

Robertson Cup Playoffs
- Finals champions: Detroit Compuware Ambassadors

NAHL seasons
- ← 1987–88 1989–90 →

The 1988–89 NAJHL season was the fifth season of the North American Junior Hockey League. The Detroit Compuware Ambassadors won the regular season championship and the Robertson Cup.

== Member changes ==
- The Western Michigan Wolves and C & H Piping joined the league as expansion franchises.

== Regular season ==
The standings at the end of the regular season were as follows:

Note: x = clinched playoff berth; y = clinched division title; z = clinched regular season title

=== Standings ===
==== Eastern Division ====
Team	GP	W	L	T	Pts	GF	GA
xyz – Detroit Compuware Ambassadors	40	30	8	2	62	248	149
x – Niagara Scenic	40	21	13	6	48	220	206
Detroit Jr. Wings	40	20	16	4	44	232	196
C & H Piping	40	10	27	3	23	189	270

==== Western Division ====
Team	GP	W	L	T	Pts	GF	GA
xy – Chicago Young Americans	40	29	8	3	61	252	138
x – Redford Royals	40	15	18	7	37	165	197
Western Michigan Wolves	40	12	22	6	30	187	226
Bloomfield Jets	40	6	31	3	15	166	277

== Robertson Cup playoffs ==
Results missing

Detroit Compuware Ambassadors won the Robertson Cup.
