= Mike Lappin =

American ice hockey player

- Born: January 1, 1969 (age 57) Chicago, Illinois, USA
- Height: 5 ft 10 in (178 cm)
- Weight: 185 lb (84 kg; 13 st 3 lb)
- Position: Center
- Shot: Left
- Played for: Boston University; Brockville Braves; St. Lawrence; Ilves; Raleigh IceCaps
- NHL draft: 239th, 1987; Chicago Blackhawks
- Playing career: 1987–1994

Michael Lappin is an American retired ice hockey center who was an All-American for St. Lawrence.

== Career ==
Lappin began attending Boston University in the fall of 1987, shortly after being drafted by his home-town Chicago Blackhawks. He played two good but unspectacular years for the Terriers, taking some time off during his sophomore season to play for Team USA at the World Junior Championships. After the season, Lappin decided to leave BU and transfer. Due to NCAA rules, because he was heading to another Division I program he would have to sit out a season. Fortunately, Lappin was still eligible to play junior hockey and was able to play for the Brockville Braves in 1990. He turned in a remarkable performance, scoring nearly three points per game and was named the league MVP.

When Lappin debuted for St. Lawrence the following year, it appeared that he had made the right decision. he more than doubled his previous career high and led the Saints with 69 points. For his senior season he was named an alternate captain and again led St. Lawrence in scoring. He helped the team win the ECAC Hockey Tournament that year and reach the NCAA Tournament.

After graduating, Lappin began his professional career in Finland but returned to North America after just 10 games. He played parts of two seasons with the Raleigh IceCaps, turning in great performances in the playoffs, before retiring in 1994.

== Statistics ==
=== Regular season and playoffs ===
			Regular Season					Playoffs
Season	Team	League	GP	G	A	Pts	PIM	GP	G	A	Pts	PIM
1986–87	Northwood School	US-Prep	—	—	—	—	—	—	—	—	—	—
1987–88	Boston University	Hockey East	34	12	15	27	40	—	—	—	—	—
1988–89	Boston University	Hockey East	27	11	16	27	43	—	—	—	—	—
1989–90	Brockville Braves	CJHL	55	74	84	158	47	—	—	—	—	—
1990–91	St. Lawrence	ECAC Hockey	34	27	42	69	36	—	—	—	—	—
1991–92	St. Lawrence	ECAC Hockey	33	25	37	62	24	—	—	—	—	—
1992–93	Ilves	SM–liiga	10	2	2	4	4	—	—	—	—	—
1992–93	Raleigh IceCaps	ECHL	49	11	21	32	24	10	8	2	10	4
1993–94	Raleigh IceCaps	ECHL	27	18	19	37	10	16	9	7	16	14
NCAA totals			128	75	110	185	143	—	—	—	—	—
ECHL totals			76	29	40	69	34	26	17	9	26	18

=== International ===
Year	Team	Event	Result	GP	G	A	Pts	PIM
1989	United States	WJC	5th	7	2	4	6	2

== Awards and honors ==
Award	Year
CJHL First–Team All–Star	1989–90
CJHL Scoring Champion	1989–90
CJHL MVP	1989–90
All-ECAC Hockey First Team	1991–92
AHCA East Second-Team All-American	1991–92
ECAC Hockey All-Tournament Team	1992
