= 1978–79 GLJHL season =

- League: Great Lakes Junior Hockey League
- Sport: Ice hockey
- Games: 50–29
- Teams: 6

Regular season
- Season champions: Paddock Pool Saints

Robertson Cup Playoffs
- Finals champions: Paddock Pool Saints

NAHL seasons
- ← 1977–78 1979–80 →

The 1978–79 GLJHL season was the fourth season of the Great Lakes Junior Hockey League. The Paddock Pool Saints won the regular season championship and the Robertson Cup.

== Member changes ==
- The Redford Royals joined the league as an expansion franchise.
- The Cleveland Jr. Barons withdrew from the league mid-season.

== Regular season ==
The standings at the end of the regular season were as follows:

Note: x = clinched playoff berth; y = clinched regular season title

=== Standings ===
Team	GP	W	L	T	Pts	GF	GA
xy – Paddock Pool Saints	50	42	5	3	87	399	200
x – Detroit Jr. Wings	50	27	17	6	60	317	242
x – Wayne Chiefs	50	27	17	6	60	281	241
x – Fraser Highlanders	50	27	18	5	59	308	284
Redford Royals	49	11	36	2	24	216	326
Cleveland Jr. Barons	29	4	25	0	8	192	295

== Robertson Cup playoffs ==
Results missing

Paddock Pool Saints won the Robertson Cup.
