= Dwayne Norris =

Canadian ice hockey player

- Born: January 8, 1970 (age 56) St. John's, Newfoundland, Canada
- Height: 5 ft 10 in (178 cm)
- Weight: 175 lb (79 kg; 12 st 7 lb)
- Position: Right wing
- Shot: Right
- Played for: Quebec Nordiques; Mighty Ducks of Anaheim; Kölner Haie; Frankfurt Lions
- National team: Canada
- NHL draft: 127th overall, 1990; Quebec Nordiques
- Playing career: 1992–2007

Olympic medal record

Men's Ice hockey
Silver medal – second place	1994 Lillehammer	Ice hockey

Carl Dwayne Norris (born January 8, 1970) is a Canadian former professional ice hockey player. He played briefly in the National Hockey League (NHL) in the 1990s with the Quebec Nordiques and the Mighty Ducks of Anaheim. He was a member of Canada's silver medal-winning team at the 1994 Lillehammer Winter Olympics.

== Playing career ==
Norris started his hockey career with the St. John's Capitals (Caps) of the Avalon Junior Hockey League, eventually leaving home at the young age of 14 to play with the Notre Dame Hounds. He then went on to play college hockey with Michigan State. From there Norris joined the AHL's Cornwall Aces after being drafted by the Quebec Nordiques (127th overall) in the 1990 NHL entry draft. The Aces then moved their team to Halifax in 1994 under the name Halifax Citadels. Norris appeared in 20 National Hockey League regular season games for the Nordiques and the Mighty Ducks of Anaheim, scoring 2 goals and 4 assists for 6 points and collecting 8 penalty minutes.

In 1996 Norris moved to Germany and joined the Kölner Haie (Cologne Sharks) of the Deutsche Eishockey Liga. In 2002, he won the German Championship with Köln when they beat perennial rivals Adler Mannheim 3–2 in the best-of-five final series with Norris netting the game winner in each of Colognes victories. Before the 2003/04 season he signed with league rivals Frankfurt Lions and immediately helped the Lions win the league title in his first season in Frankfurt. There Norris played until 2007, when he finished his playing career.

Norris's most memorable moment may have occurred during the 1990 Junior World Hockey Tournament in Helsinki when he scored the winning goal to help Team Canada beat Czechoslovakia and win the gold medal. He won a silver medal in 1994 with Team Canada at the Lillehammer Winter Olympics.

== Coach and managerial career ==
- General Manager on the Frankfurt Lions (2007—2010).
- Assistant coach on the Oakland Jr. Grizzlies U16 (2017—2018).

In 2007 Norris retired from active play and, in a surprise move by his last club, was hired as the Lions' general manager in 2007, a position he held until the team filed for bankruptcy in May 2010.

He then became the hockey director of an elite youth hockey program in Michigan, the Oakland Junior Grizzlies. He currently coaches the Bantam Major and PeeWee Major Grizzly AAA hockey teams.

== Family ==
Norris and his wife Traci have three sons, Joshua, Coale and Dalton. All three have been involved in the Oakland Junior Grizzlies AAA program. Son Josh Norris was a first-round selection of the San Jose Sharks in the 2017 NHL entry draft and is currently a player for the Buffalo Sabres. Dalton is currently the captain of the Bowling Green State University Falcons. His younger brother Warren Norris played professionally with the St. John's Maple Leafs and Grand Rapids Griffins.

== Career statistics ==
=== Regular season and playoffs ===
			Regular season					Playoffs
Season	Team	League	GP	G	A	Pts	PIM	GP	G	A	Pts	PIM
1987–88	Notre Dame Hounds	SJHL	55	42	48	90	97	—	—	—	—	—
1988–89	Michigan State University	CCHA	47	16	23	39	40	—	—	—	—	—
1989–90	Michigan State University	CCHA	36	19	26	45	30	—	—	—	—	—
1990–91	Michigan State University	CCHA	40	26	25	51	60	—	—	—	—	—
1991–92	Michigan State University	CCHA	44	44	39	83	62	—	—	—	—	—
1992–93	Halifax Citadels	AHL	50	25	28	53	62	—	—	—	—	—
1993–94	Canadian National Team	Intl	48	18	14	32	22	—	—	—	—	—
1993–94	Quebec Nordiques	NHL	4	1	1	2	4	—	—	—	—	—
1993–94	Cornwall Aces	AHL	9	2	9	11	0	13	7	4	11	17
1994–95	Quebec Nordiques	NHL	13	1	2	3	2	—	—	—	—	—
1994–95	Cornwall Aces	AHL	60	30	43	73	61	12	7	8	15	4
1995–96	Mighty Ducks of Anaheim	NHL	3	0	1	1	2	—	—	—	—	—
1995–96	Baltimore Bandits	AHL	62	31	55	86	16	12	6	9	15	12
1995–96	Los Angeles Ice Dogs	IHL	14	7	16	23	22	—	—	—	—	—
1996–97	Kölner Haie	DEL	45	14	28	42	24	4	3	0	3	0
1997–98	Kölner Haie	DEL	40	13	15	28	34	3	0	0	0	0
1998–99	Kölner Haie	DEL	48	16	30	46	62	5	2	3	5	8
1999–00	Kölner Haie	DEL	49	17	23	40	70	10	4	1	5	12
2000–01	Kölner Haie	DEL	59	15	31	46	48	3	0	1	1	10
2001–02	Kölner Haie	DEL	48	13	27	40	56	13	5	2	7	14
2002–03	Kölner Haie	DEL	49	16	24	40	72	10	3	8	11	20
2003–04	Frankfurt Lions	DEL	50	20	24	44	109	15	9	3	12	26
2004–05	Frankfurt Lions	DEL	51	27	31	58	88	11	1	5	6	41
2005–06	Frankfurt Lions	DEL	48	13	19	32	58	—	—	—	—	—
2006–07	Frankfurt Lions	DEL	46	15	23	38	67	2	0	1	1	2
AHL totals			181	88	135	223	139	37	20	21	41	33
DEL totals			533	179	275	454	688	76	27	24	51	133
NHL totals			20	2	4	6	8	—	—	—	—	—

=== International ===
Year	Team	Event	Place	GP	G	A	Pts	PIM
1990	Canada	WJC	1st place, gold medalist(s)	7	2	4	6	2
1994	Canada	OG	2nd place, silver medalist(s)	8	2	2	4	4

The source:

== Awards and honours ==
The source:

Year	Award	League
1990	1st place, gold medalist(s)	WC
1992	First All-Star Team	NCAA (CCHA)
1992	Player of the Year	NCAA (CCHA)
1992	First All-American Team	NCAA (WCHA)
1995	First All-Star Team	AHL
1995	All-Star Game	AHL
1996	All-Star Game	AHL
1996	Player of the Week	AHL
1996	Second All-Star Team	AHL
2002	1st place, gold medalist(s)	DEL
2003	All-Star Game	DEL
2004	1st place, gold medalist(s)	DEL
2005	Best Plus/Minus	DEL
2005	All-Star Game	DEL
2007	All-Star Game	DEL

Awards and achievements
Preceded by Jim Dowd	CCHA Player of the Year; 1991-92	Succeeded by Brian Savage
