= Christian Soucy =

Canadian ice hockey player

- Born: September 14, 1970 (age 54); Gatineau, Quebec, Canada
- Height: 5 ft 11 in (180 cm)
- Weight: 160 lb (73 kg; 11 st 6 lb)
- Position: Goaltender
- Caught: Right
- Played for: Chicago Blackhawks
- NHL draft: Undrafted
- Playing career: 1993–2003

Christian Soucy (born September 14, 1970) is a Canadian former professional ice hockey goaltender. He appeared in one National Hockey League game with the Chicago Blackhawks in the 1993–94 season. The rest of his career, which lasted from 1993 to 2003, was spent in the minor leagues.

== Early life ==
Soucy was born in Gatineau, Quebec. As a youth, he played in the 1983 Quebec International Pee-Wee Hockey Tournament with a minor ice hockey team from Gatineau.

== Career ==
Soucy joined the Blackhawks after two years playing for the University of Vermont men's hockey team, where he ranks fifth all-time in save percentage (.908) and fifth all-time in goals against average (2.99). He played less than four minutes of one National Hockey League game with the Chicago Blackhawks in the 1993–94 season, on March 31, 1994, against the Washington Capitals. Soucy did not face a shot during that brief appearance. Soucy's record was surpassed by Jorge Alves on December 31, 2016, who played 7.6 seconds in his only NHL game.

Throughout his 10-year career, Soucy played in various minor leagues, including the International Hockey League, American Hockey League, ECHL, and Central Hockey League, among others.

== Career statistics ==
=== Regular season and playoffs ===
			Regular season									Playoffs
Season	Team	League	GP	W	L	T	MIN	GA	SO	GAA	SV%	GP	W	L	MIN	GA	SO	GAA	SV%
1989–90	Pembroke Lumber Kings	CJHL	47	16	24	4	2721	212	1	4.67	—	—	—	—	—	—	—	—	—
1990–91	Pembroke Lumber Kings	CJHL	54	27	24	1	3109	198	2	3.82	—	—	—	—	—	—	—	—	—
1991–92	University of Vermont	ECAC	30	15	11	3	1783	81	0	2.83	.910	—	—	—	—	—	—	—	—
1992–93	University of Vermont	ECAC	29	11	15	3	1708	90	1	3.16	.906	—	—	—	—	—	—	—	—
1993–94	Chicago Blackhawks	NHL	1	0	0	0	3	0	0	0.00	1.000	—	—	—	—	—	—	—	—
1993–94	Indianapolis Ice	IHL	46	14	25	1	2302	159	1	4.14	.884	—	—	—	—	—	—	—	—
1994–95	Indianapolis Ice	IHL	42	15	17	5	2216	148	0	4.01	.876	—	—	—	—	—	—	—	—
1995–96	Fort Worth Fire	CHL	5	3	2	0	300	19	0	3.80	.891	—	—	—	—	—	—	—	—
1995–96	Jacksonville Lizard Kings	ECHL	3	2	1	0	179	11	0	3.68	.895	—	—	—	—	—	—	—	—
1995–96	Indianapolis Ice	IHL	22	12	9	0	1198	62	0	3.11	.914	—	—	—	—	—	—	—	—
1996–97	Kentucky Thoroughblades	AHL	3	0	2	0	138	11	0	4.77	.866	—	—	—	—	—	—	—	—
1996–97	Baton Rouge Kingfish	ECHL	46	18	20	3	2421	128	3	3.17	.904	—	—	—	—	—	—	—	—
1997–98	Austin Ice Bats	WPHL	11	6	5	0	658	38	0	3.46	.896	5	2	3	321	14	0	2.61	.913
1997–98	Houston Aeros	IHL	5	4	1	0	288	9	0	1.87	.915	—	—	—	—	—	—	—	—
1998–99	Baton Rouge Kingfish	ECHL	25	9	9	4	1386	69	2	2.99	.914	—	—	—	—	—	—	—	—
1998–99	Tucson Gila Monsters	WCHL	16	6	7	2	903	56	0	3.72	.870	—	—	—	—	—	—	—	—
1999–00	Arkansas GlacierCats	WPHL	65	31	20	9	3652	225	1	3.70	.905	6	3	3	372	31	1	5.00	.894
2000–01	Elmira Jackals	UHL	54	27	19	6	3030	186	3	3.68	.890	1	0	1	58	1	0	1.02	.967
2000–01	Louisville Panthers	AHL	1	0	1	0	60	5	0	5.00	.886	—	—	—	—	—	—	—	—
2001–02	Elmira Jackals	UHL	52	29	15	5	2951	133	3	2.70	.917	14	9	5	864	31	1	2.15	.931
2002–03	Alaska Aces	WCHL	45	13	26	3	2485	171	1	4.13	.882	—	—	—	—	—	—	—	—
NHL totals			1	0	0	0	4	0	0	0.00	1.000	—	—	—	—	—	—	—	—

== Awards and honours ==
Award	Year
All-ECAC Hockey Rookie Team	1991–92
All-ECAC Hockey First Team	1991–92
AHCA East Second-Team All-American	1991–92
All-ECAC Hockey Second Team	1992–93

== See also ==
- List of players who played only one game in the NHL

Awards and achievements
Preceded by Geoff Finch	ECAC Hockey Rookie of the Year; 1990–91	Succeeded by Burke Murphy
