= 1982–83 GLJHL season =

- League: North American Junior Hockey League
- Sport: Ice hockey
- Games: 45
- Teams: 5

Regular season
- Season champions: Paddock Pool Saints

Robertson Cup Playoffs
- Finals champions: Paddock Pool Saints

NAHL seasons
- ← 1981–82 1983–84 →

The 1982–83 GLJHL season was the eighth season of the Great Lakes Junior Hockey League. The Paddock Pool Saints won the regular season championship and the Robertson Cup.

== Member changes ==
- The Waterford Lakers relocated and became the Melvindale Lakers.

== Regular season ==
The standings at the end of the regular season were as follows:

Note: x = clinched playoff berth; y = clinched regular season title

=== Standings ===
Team	GP	W	L	T	Pts	GF	GA
xy – Paddock Pool Saints	45	29	11	5	63	281	165
x – Fraser Flags	45	28	13	4	60	231	167
x – Redford Royals	45	28	15	2	58	239	181
x – Detroit Jr. Wings	45	15	24	6	36	212	246
Melvindale Lakers	45	13	26	4	30	232	285

== Robertson Cup playoffs ==
Results missing

Paddock Pool Saints won the Robertson Cup.
