= Mike Boland (ice hockey, born 1954) =

Canadian ice hockey player

- Born: October 29, 1954 London, Ontario, Canada
- Died: October 8, 2017 (aged 62) Amherst, New York, U.S.
- Height: 6 ft 0 in (183 cm)
- Weight: 180 lb (82 kg; 12 st 12 lb)
- Position: Defence
- Shot: Right
- Played for: Kansas City Scouts; Buffalo Sabres
- NHL draft: 110th overall, 1974; Kansas City Scouts
- WHA draft: 94th overall, 1974; San Diego Mariners
- Playing career: 1974–1984

Michael John Boland (October 29, 1954 – October 8, 2017) was a Canadian ice hockey defenceman. He played 23 games in the National Hockey League. The rest of his career, which lasted from 1974 to 1984, was spent in the minor leagues, primarily in the International Hockey League.

== Playing career ==
Boland was drafted in the seventh round, 110th overall, by the Kansas City Scouts in the 1974 NHL amateur draft. He played one game in the National Hockey League with Kansas City in the 1974–75 season and 22 more with the Buffalo Sabres during the 1978–79 season.

In his 23-game NHL career, Boland scored one goal and added two assists. Boland remained an active hockey player with the Buffalo Sabres Alumni Association, which raises money for various charities around Western New York. His sister Diane is married to his former teammate, Don Luce. Boland died after a period of declining health at a hospital in Amherst, New York in 2017.

== Career statistics ==
=== Regular season and playoffs ===
			Regular season					Playoffs
Season	Team	League	GP	G	A	Pts	PIM	GP	G	A	Pts	PIM
1971–72	London Knights	OHA	14	1	1	2	4	—	—	—	—	—
1972–73	Sault Ste. Marie Greyhounds	OHA	55	4	15	19	139	—	—	—	—	—
1973–74	Sault Ste. Marie Greyhounds	OHA	67	11	39	50	200	—	—	—	—	—
1974–75	Kansas City Scouts	NHL	1	0	0	0	0	—	—	—	—	—
1974–75	Port Huron Flags	IHL	71	2	12	14	172	5	2	1	3	14
1975–76	Port Huron Flags	IHL	75	8	16	24	208	15	0	6	6	51
1976–77	Port Huron Flags	IHL	66	7	37	44	306	—	—	—	—	—
1977–78	Port Huron Flags	IHL	2	0	0	0	0	—	—	—	—	—
1977–78	Fort Wayne Komets	IHL	74	7	39	46	228	11	3	3	6	40
1978–79	Buffalo Sabres	NHL	22	1	2	3	29	3	1	0	1	2
1978–79	Hershey Bears	AHL	46	3	17	20	86	—	—	—	—	—
1979–80	Rochester Americans	AHL	80	4	28	32	178	4	1	1	2	6
1980–81	Rochester Americans	AHL	5	0	1	1	8	—	—	—	—	—
1980–81	Salt Lake Golden Eagles	CHL	69	5	21	26	188	17	2	1	3	70
1981–82	Salt Lake Golden Eagles	CHL	64	1	13	14	161	10	1	2	3	45
1982–83	Hershey Bears	AHL	57	0	11	11	68	5	0	0	0	6
1982–83	Fort Wayne Komets	IHL	1	0	0	0	0	—	—	—	—	—
1983–84	Fort Wayne Komets	IHL	81	8	49	57	161	6	0	3	3	35
IHL totals			370	32	153	185	1079	37	5	13	18	140
NHL totals			23	1	2	3	29	3	1	0	1	2
