= 1980–81 GLJHL season =

- League: Great Lakes Junior Hockey League
- Sport: Ice hockey
- Games: 53–54
- Teams: 3

Regular season
- Season champions: Paddock Pool Saints

Robertson Cup Playoffs
- Finals champions: Paddock Pool Saints

NAHL seasons
- ← 1979–80 1981–82 →

The 1980–81 GLJHL season was the sixth season of the Great Lakes Junior Hockey League. The Paddock Pool Saints won the regular season championship and the Robertson Cup.

== Member changes ==
- The Fraser Highlanders and the Wayne Chiefs folded.

== Regular season ==
The standings at the end of the regular season were as follows:

Note: x = clinched playoff berth; y = clinched regular season title

=== Standings ===
Team	GP	W	L	T	Pts	GF	GA
xy – Paddock Pool Saints	53	39	10	4	82	357	223
x – Redford Royals	53	38	13	2	78	337	212
Detroit Jr. Wings	54	35	16	3	73	395	244

Note: League standings include games against non-members, resulting in unbalanced results.

== Robertson Cup playoffs ==
Results missing

Paddock Pool Saints won the Robertson Cup.
