= 1976–77 GLJHL season =

- League: Great Lakes Junior Hockey League
- Sport: Ice hockey
- Games: 48–46
- Teams: 5

Regular season
- Season champions: Paddock Pool Saints

Robertson Cup Playoffs
- Finals champions: Paddock Pool Saints

NAHL seasons
- ← 1975–76 1977–78 →

The 1976–77 GLJHL season was the second season of the Great Lakes Junior Hockey League. The Paddock Pool Saints won the regular season championship and the Robertson Cup.

== Member changes ==
- The Detroit Little Caesars withdrew from the league.
- The Oakland Chiefs relocated and became the Wayne Chiefs.
- The Cleveland Jr. Barons and the Fraser Highlanders joined the league as expansion franchises.

== Regular season ==
The standings at the end of the regular season were as follows:

Note: x = clinched playoff berth; y = clinched regular season title

=== Standings ===
Team	GP	W	L	T	Pts	GF	GA
xy – Paddock Pool Saints	46	33	7	6	72	355	170
x – Detroit Jr. Wings	48	30	12	6	66	287	197
x – Fraser Highlanders	48	27	15	6	60	275	206
x – Wayne Chiefs	48	23	16	9	55	230	179
Cleveland Jr. Barons	47	10	35	2	22	225	339

== Robertson Cup playoffs ==
Results missing

Paddock Pool Saints won the Robertson Cup.
