= Buffalo Sabres Alumni Hockey Team =

Barnstorming sports team

- City: Buffalo, New York
- League: Independent barnstormer team

The Buffalo Sabres Alumni Hockey Team is an independent barnstorming hockey team located in Buffalo, New York. Its roster consists entirely of retired National Hockey League players, mostly former members of the Buffalo Sabres. The team is operated by the Buffalo Sabres Alumni Association.

The team plays teams assembled by various local organizations around Western New York primarily as charity fundraisers. Its uniform is identical to the classic "blue and gold" Sabres home (white) uniform from 1970 to 1996.

The team considers KeyBank Center to be its home arena but rarely plays there.

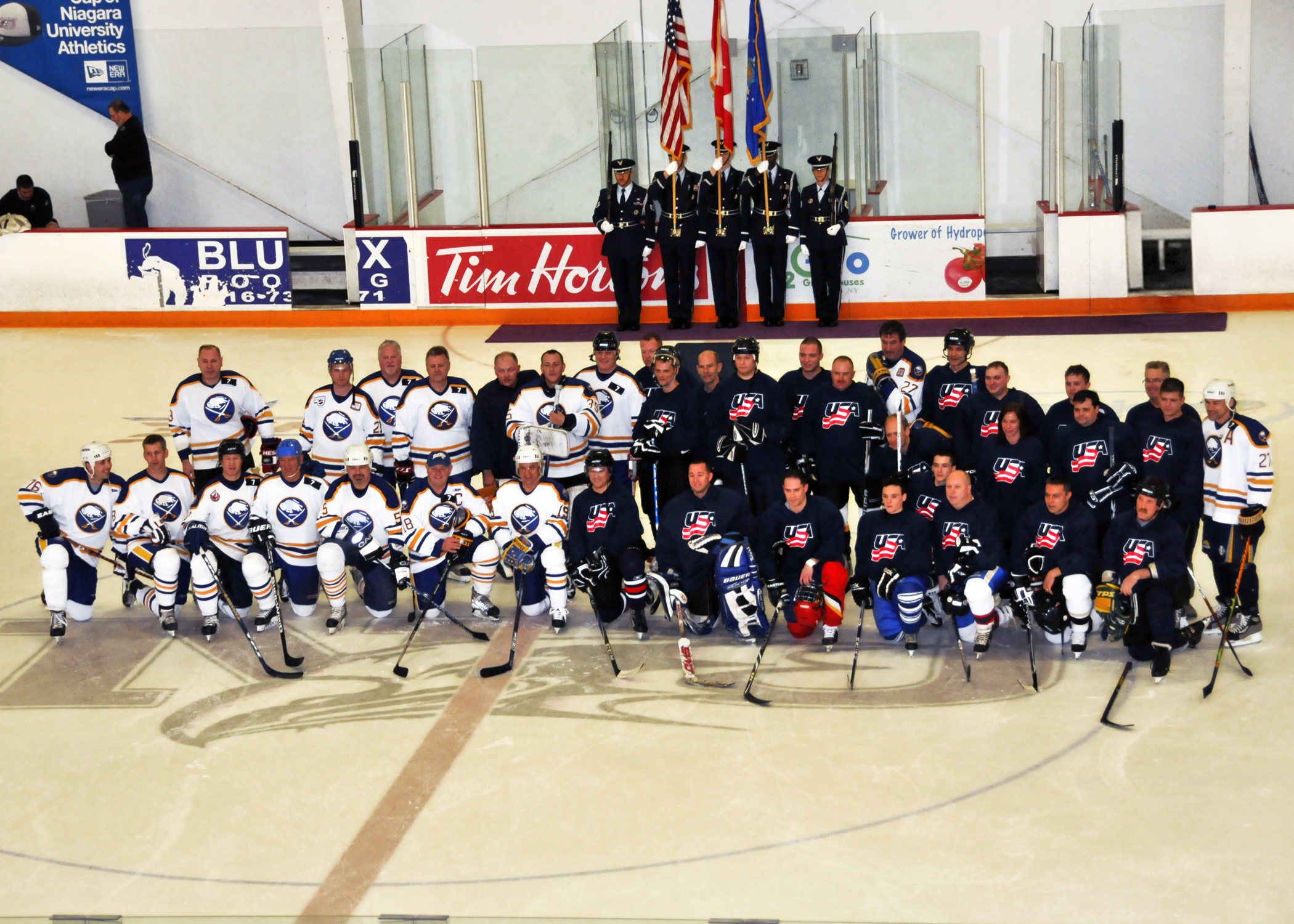
The Buffalo Sabres Alumni Hockey Team (left) at Dwyer Arena before a 2011 game against a team representing the Niagara Falls Air Reserve Station

The Alumni Team played at HSBC Arena as part of the pre-game events for the 2008 NHL Winter Classic held at Ralph Wilson Stadium on January 1, 2008. They were also a part of the 2013-14 AHL Outdoor Classic as the opponent of the Rochester Americans alumni team in December 2013.

One of the key initiatives of the Buffalo Sabres Alumni is to fund-raise and support their family of scholarships they award to high school seniors attending college.

== Players ==
As of November 13, 2024 in their game against the cast of Shoresy:

=== Current roster ===
- Martin Biron
- Eric Boulton
- Tim Connolly
- Brian Gionta
- Cody Hodgson
- Patrick Kaleta
- Tim Kennedy
- Zenon Konopka
- Cody McCormick
- Craig Muni
- Ted Nolan
- Andrew Peters
- Rob Ray
- Derek Roy
- Darryl Shannon
- Rick Vaive
- Mike Wilson

=== Past players ===
- Grant Ledyard
- Ric Seiling
- Richie Dunn
- Morris Titanic
- Derek Smith
- Yuri Khmylev
- Richard Smehlik

Several other players have played on the Sabres Alumni team, depending on the importance of the event, including The "French Connection" line of Rick Martin, Gilbert Perreault, and Rene Robert; Larry Playfair, Fred Stanfield, Bill Hajt, Lindy Ruff, Danny Gare, Tony McKegney, Mike Boland, and Daren Puppa

Notable non-Sabres to have played for the team include:

- Mark Laforest, a Welland, Ontario native and journeyman NHL goalie
- Kevyn Adams, who played most of his NHL career with the Carolina Hurricanes. Adams grew up in Clarence; he joined the team in 2009. Adams formerly served as an assistant coach with the Sabres. Adams serves as the general manager of the Sabres as of 2024.
- Seymour H. Knox IV, son of former Sabres owner Seymour H. Knox III and nephew of Northrup R. Knox, the only non-professional hockey player to have ever played for the team, playing goaltender on at least one occasion.
- Marcel Dionne, Hockey Hall of Fame centreman. Dionne resides in Buffalo but never played there in his career (he spent most of his career with the Los Angeles Kings). He has thus far played in two Sabres Alumni games—the first in 1997 (a fundraiser for Ted Darling as an opponent and again in 2007 (the Parete fundraiser) as a member of the team, thus making him the most prominent non-Sabre to play for the team. Dionne at one time was affiliated with the Sabres' then-ECHL affiliate in Charleston, South Carolina.
