= Daniel Laperrière =

Canadian ice hockey player and coach

- Born: March 28, 1969 (age 57) Laval, Quebec, Canada
- Height: 6 ft 0 in (183 cm)
- Weight: 191 lb (87 kg; 13 st 9 lb)
- Position: Defence
- Shot: Left
- Played for: St. Louis Blues; Ottawa Senators; SERC Wild Wings; Eisbären Berlin
- NHL draft: 93rd overall, 1989; St. Louis Blues
- Playing career: 1992–2008

Daniel Jacques Laperrière (born March 28, 1969) is a Canadian ice hockey coach and former professional ice hockey player. Laperriere played 48 games in the National Hockey League with the St. Louis Blues and Ottawa Senators from 1992 to 1996. The rest of his career, which lasted from 1992 to 2008, was spent in the minor leagues and Europe. He is the son of Jacques Laperrière, who also played in the NHL and is in the Hockey Hall of Fame.

== Biography ==
As a youth, Laperrière played in the 1981 Quebec International Pee-Wee Hockey Tournament with a minor ice hockey team from Laval, Quebec.

He played with the St. Louis Blues and the Ottawa Senators. He graduated from St. Lawrence University where he played for the Skating Saints, earning Hobey Baker Award nomination in 1992.

Laperrière was drafted 93rd overall by St. Louis in the 1989 NHL entry draft, and went on to play in 48 regular-season games, scoring two goals and five assists for seven points, collecting 27 penalty minutes.

In 1997, he moved to Germany to play in the Deutsche Eishockey Liga. In five seasons, he played for the SERC Wild Wings and Eisbären Berlin. He also spent a season in the 2nd Bundesliga for EV Duisburg. He then spent two seasons in Switzerland's Nationalliga B for HC Ajoie.

He returned to Canada in 2005 to play in the Ligue Nord-Américaine de Hockey for the Saint-Georges CRS Express. He moved to the Arizona Sundogs of the Central Hockey League in 2006, where his 57 points (11 goals and 46 assists) in 60 games were his most productive in his career and were ranked 5th among CHL defencemen in points.

He is currently a pro scout for the Colorado Avalanche.

== Career statistics ==
=== Regular season and playoffs ===
			Regular season					Playoffs
Season	Team	League	GP	G	A	Pts	PIM	GP	G	A	Pts	PIM
1986–87	Collège Saint-Sacrement	HS-CA	17	22	17	39	—	—	—	—	—	—
1987–88	Collège Laval	HS-CA	—	—	—	—	—	—	—	—	—	—
1988–89	St. Lawrence University	ECAC	34	1	11	12	14	—	—	—	—	—
1989–90	St. Lawrence University	ECAC	29	6	19	25	16	—	—	—	—	—
1990–91	St. Lawrence University	ECAC	29	6	24	30	18	—	—	—	—	—
1991–92	St. Lawrence University	ECAC	32	8	45	53	36	—	—	—	—	—
1992–93	St. Louis Blues	NHL	5	0	1	1	0	—	—	—	—	—
1992–93	Peoria Rivermen	IHL	54	4	20	24	28	—	—	—	—	—
1993–94	St. Louis Blues	NHL	20	1	3	4	8	—	—	—	—	—
1993–94	Peoria Rivermen	IHL	56	10	37	47	16	6	0	2	2	2
1994–95	St. Louis Blues	NHL	4	0	0	0	15	—	—	—	—	—
1994–95	Ottawa Senators	NHL	13	1	1	2	0	—	—	—	—	—
1994–95	Peoria Rivermen	IHL	65	19	33	52	42	—	—	—	—	—
1995–96	Ottawa Senators	NHL	6	0	0	0	4	—	—	—	—	—
1995–96	Prince Edward Island Senators	AHL	15	2	7	9	4	—	—	—	—	—
1995–96	Atlanta Knights	IHL	15	4	9	13	4	—	—	—	—	—
1995–96	Kansas City Blades	IHL	23	2	6	8	11	5	0	1	1	0
1996–97	Portland Pirates	AHL	69	14	26	40	33	5	0	2	2	2
1997–98	SERC Wild Wings	DEL	45	11	24	35	16	6	3	4	7	2
1998–99	SERC Wild Wings	DEL	46	9	30	39	52	—	—	—	—	—
1999–00	SERC Wild Wings	DEL	55	17	29	46	16	—	—	—	—	—
2000–01	Eisbären Berlin	DEL	38	5	10	15	12	—	—	—	—	—
2001–02	Eisbären Berlin	DEL	56	11	22	33	12	4	0	2	2	0
2002–03	EV Duisburg	GER-2	34	1	17	18	22	—	—	—	—	—
2003–04	HC Ajoie	NLB	45	9	29	38	34	11	11	3	14	4
2004–05	HC Ajoie	NLB	27	6	15	21	6	—	—	—	—	—
2005–06	CRS Express de Saint-Georges	LNAH	40	6	23	29	4	3	0	1	1	2
2006–07	Arizona Sundogs	CHL	60	11	46	57	40	14	4	9	13	8
2007–08	Arizona Sundogs	CHL	61	18	33	51	28	17	3	15	18	4
DEL totals			240	53	115	168	108	10	3	6	9	2
NHL totals			48	2	5	7	27	—	—	—	—	—

== Awards and honours ==
List of awards and honours.

Award	Year
All-ECAC Hockey Second Team	1990–91
ECAC Hockey All-Tournament Team	1991
All-ECAC Hockey First Team	1991–92
AHCA East First-Team All-American	1991–92
ECAC Hockey All-Tournament Team	1992

Awards and achievements
Preceded by Peter Ciavaglia	ECAC Hockey Player of the Year; 1991–92	Succeeded by Ted Drury
Preceded by Hugo Belanger	ECAC Hockey Most Outstanding Player in Tournament; 1992	Succeeded by Chris Rogles
