= 1979–80 GLJHL season =

- League: Great Lakes Junior Hockey League
- Sport: Ice hockey
- Games: 45–46
- Teams: 5

Regular season
- Season champions: Paddock Pool Saints

Robertson Cup Playoffs
- Finals champions: Paddock Pool Saints

NAHL seasons
- ← 1978–79 1980–81 →

The 1979–80 GLJHL season was the fifth season of the Great Lakes Junior Hockey League. The Paddock Pool Saints won the regular season championship and the Robertson Cup.

== Member changes ==
None

== Regular season ==
The standings at the end of the regular season were as follows:

Note: x = clinched playoff berth; y = clinched regular season title

=== Standings ===
Team	GP	W	L	T	Pts	GF	GA
xy – Paddock Pool Saints	46	32	11	3	67	277	183
x – Wayne Chiefs	46	26	15	5	57	285	224
x – Redford Royals	46	24	16	6	54	233	211
x – Detroit Jr. Wings	46	22	21	3	47	226	229
Fraser Highlanders	45	7	37	1	15	186	321

== Robertson Cup playoffs ==
Results missing

Paddock Pool Saints won the Robertson Cup.
