= 1986–87 NAJHL season =

- League: North American Junior Hockey League
- Sport: Ice hockey
- Games: 37–3
- Teams: 5

Regular season
- Season champions: Detroit Compuware Ambassadors

Robertson Cup Playoffs
- Finals champions: Detroit Compuware Ambassadors

NAHL seasons
- ← 1985–86 1987–88 →

The 1986–87 NAJHL season was the third season of the North American Junior Hockey League. The Detroit Compuware Ambassadors won the regular season championship and the Robertson Cup.

== Member changes ==
- The Chicago Patriots and Chicago Cougars joined the league as affiliate members. The Patriots folded after 3 games while the Cougars do not appear to have played a single match before withdrawing.
- The St. Clair Shores Falcons relocated and became the Detroit Falcons.

== Regular season ==
The standings at the end of the regular season were as follows:

Note: x = clinched playoff berth; y = clinched regular season title

=== Standings ===
Team	GP	W	L	T	Pts	GF	GA
xy – Detroit Compuware Ambassadors	37	23	8	6	52	214	122
x – Detroit Falcons	37	24	9	4	52	223	117
Hennessey Engineers	37	14	16	7	35	165	154
Chicago Patriots	3	0	3	0	0	8	40
Chicago Cougars	0	0	0	0	0	0	0

Note: Neither Chicago team was active by the end of the season.

== Robertson Cup playoffs ==
Results missing

Detroit Compuware Ambassadors won the Robertson Cup.
