= Parris Duffus =

American ice hockey player (born 1970)

- Born: January 27, 1970 (age 56) Denver, Colorado, U.S.
- Height: 6 ft 2 in (188 cm)
- Weight: 192 lb (87 kg; 13 st 10 lb)
- Position: Goaltender
- Caught: Left
- Played for: Phoenix Coyotes; HPK; Jokerit; HIFK; Berlin Capitals; Nürnberg Ice Tigers; HC Neftekhimik Nizhnekamsk
- National team: United States
- NHL draft: 180th overall, 1990; St. Louis Blues
- Playing career: 1992–2003

Parris Bryan Duffus (born January 27, 1970) is an American former professional ice hockey goaltender.

== Playing career ==
Duffus was drafted 180th overall by the St. Louis Blues in the 1990 NHL entry draft and played one NHL game for the Phoenix Coyotes in the 1996–97 NHL season. He allowed one goal on eight shots in his sole NHL appearance against the Vancouver Canucks on February 27, 1997, playing 28:49 of ice time.

He was the goaltender for the Minnesota Moose for two seasons and holds the Minnesota franchise record for a GAA of 3.31 (1995–96) and SV%: .895 (1995–96).

Duffus lead Team USA to a bronze medal in the IIHF World Championships in 1996 in Austria, the nation's first medal in 34 years. He also backstopped Team USA in qualifying play for Pool A after a disastrous 1998 World Championships. Duffus earned a shutout against Kazakhstan, beat Estonia & Austria to earn the US a berth in Pool A in the 1999 World Championships.

Duffus played in the Finnish SM-liiga where he played for HPK, Jokerit, and HIFK. He also played for the Berlin Capitals and Nürnberg Ice Tigers in Germany, and HC Neftekhimik Nizhnekamsk in Russia.

Duffus played for the Fort Wayne Komets of UHL in 2002–03 season before retiring.

After retiring from professional hockey, Duffus became a Fort Wayne firefighter but is called upon by the Komets periodically as an emergency backup goaltender.

== Career statistics ==
=== Regular season and playoffs ===
			Regular season									Playoffs
Season	Team	League	GP	W	L	T	MIN	GA	SO	GAA	SV%	GP	W	L	MIN	GA	SO	GAA	SV%
1988–89	Melville Millionaires	SJHL	39	—	—	—	—	—	—	6.17	—	—	—	—	—	—	—	—	—
1989–90	Melfort Mustangs	SJHL	51	17	23	3	2828	226	2	4.79	.860	—	—	—	—	—	—	—	—
1990–91	Cornell University	ECAC	4	0	0	0	37	3	0	4.86	.850	—	—	—	—	—	—	—	—
1991–92	Cornell University	ECAC	28	14	11	3	1677	74	1	2.65	.913	—	—	—	—	—	—	—	—
1992–93	Hampton Roads Admirals	ECHL	4	3	1	0	245	13	0	3.18	.909	—	—	—	—	—	—	—	—
1992–93	Peoria Rivermen	IHL	37	16	15	4	2149	142	0	3.96	.875	1	0	1	59	5	0	5.08	.868
1993–94	Peoria Rivermen	IHL	36	19	10	3	1845	141	0	4.58	.862	2	0	1	92	6	0	3.88	.880
1994–95	Peoria Rivermen	IHL	29	17	7	3	1581	71	3	2.69	.911	7	4	2	409	17	0	2.49	.929
1995–96	Minnesota Moose	IHL	35	10	17	2	1812	100	1	3.31	.895	—	—	—	—	—	—	—	—
1996–97	Phoenix Coyotes	NHL	1	0	0	0	29	1	0	2.08	.875	—	—	—	—	—	—	—	—
1996–97	Las Vegas Thunder	IHL	58	28	19	6	3266	176	3	3.23	.897	3	0	3	175	8	0	2.73	.917
1997–98	HPK	FIN	24	11	13	0	1436	79	0	3.30	.911	—	—	—	—	—	—	—	—
1997–98	Cincinnati Cyclones	IHL	17	10	5	0	916	47	0	3.08	.907	5	1	3	252	12	0	2.85	.898
1998–99	Berlin Capitals	DEL	38	—	—	—	2256	126	1	3.35	.890	—	—	—	—	—	—	—	—
1998–99	Jokerit	FIN	15	7	8	0	894	34	5	2.28	.932	3	0	3	188	13	0	4.15	.871
1999–00	HIFK	FIN	29	12	10	7	1767	72	1	2.44	.922	7	4	3	432	24	0	3.33	.890
1999–00	Fort Wayne Komets	UHL	3	3	0	0	180	10	0	3.33	.897	—	—	—	—	—	—	—	—
2000–01	Nürnberg Ice Tigers	DEL	49	—	—	—	2794	125	2	2.68	.903	4	—	—	281	11	0	2.35	.919
2001–12	Anchorage Aces	WCHL	7	1	6	0	313	31	0	5.94	.823	—	—	—	—	—	—	—	—
2001–12	Neftekhimik Nizhnekamsk	RSL	38	9	22	2	2193	97	3	2.65	.880	—	—	—	—	—	—	—	—
2002–03	Fort Wayne Komets	UHL	5	3	1	0	242	14	0	3.47	.865	—	—	—	—	—	—	—	—
2009–10	SønderjyskE	IHL	1	—	—	—	—	—	—	0.00	1.000	—	—	—	—	—	—	—	—
NHL totals			1	0	0	0	29	1	0	2.08	.875	—	—	—	—	—	—	—	—

=== International ===
Year	Team	Event	GP	W	L	T	MIN	GA	SO	GAA	SV%
1996	United States	WC	7	4	3	0	425	18	0	2.54	.948
1999	United States	WC	5	—	—	—	258	7	1	1.63	.939
Junior totals			12	—	—	—	683	25	1	2.20	—

== Awards and honors ==
Award	Year
All-ECAC Hockey Second Team	1991–92
AHCA East First-Team All-American	1991–92
ECAC Hockey All-Tournament Team	1992

== See also ==
- List of players who played only one game in the NHL
