= Melvindale Blades =

- City: Melvindale, Michigan
- League: NAJHL
- Founded: 1988
- Folded: 1990

Franchise history
- 1988–1989: C & H Piping
- 1989–1990: Melvindale Blades

The Melvindale Blades were a Junior A ice hockey team playing in the North American Junior Hockey League. The team was based in Melvindale, Michigan.

== History ==
C & H Piping was one of two expansion teams added to the NAJHL in 1988. After a poor season, the team lost its sponsor and changed its name to the Melvindale Blades. The club folded sometime before the following season. The most famous alumnus of the franchise is United States Hockey Hall of Famer Brian Rafalski.

== Season-by-season records ==
Season	GP	W	L	T	Pts	GF	GA	Finish	Playoffs
C & H Piping
1988–89	40	10	27	3	23	189	270	4th of 4, Eastern Div. 7th of 8, NAJHL	Did not qualify
Melvindale Blades
1989–90	44	15	24	5	35	190	235	4th of 4, Eastern Div. 7th of 8, NAJHL	Did not qualify
