= 1992 ECAC Hockey men's ice hockey tournament =

Men's ice hockey tournament of 1992

1992 ECAC Men's ice hockey tournament
- Dates: March 3–14, 1992
- Teams: 10
- Finals site: Boston Garden; Boston, Massachusetts
- Champions: St. Lawrence (4th title)
- Winning coach: Joe Marsh (3rd title)
- MVP: Daniel Laperrière (St. Lawrence)
- ECAC Men's Ice Hockey Tournaments

The 1992 ECAC Hockey Men's Ice Hockey Tournament was the 31st tournament in league history. It was played between March 3 and March 14, 1992. Preliminary and quarterfinal games were played at home team campus sites, while the 'final four' games were, for the final time, played at the Boston Garden in Boston, Massachusetts. By winning the tournament, St. Lawrence received the ECAC's automatic bid to the 1992 NCAA Division I Men's Ice Hockey Tournament.

== Format ==
The tournament featured four rounds of play. The two teams that finish below tenth place in the standings are not eligible for tournament play. Each round was a single-elimination series. In the preliminary round, the seventh and tenth seeds and the eighth and ninth seeds each play to determine the final qualifying teams for the quarterfinals. In the quarterfinals the first seed and lower ranked qualifier, the second and higher ranked qualifier, the third seed and sixth seed and the fourth seed and fifth seed played. In the semifinals, the highest remaining seed plays the lowest remaining seed while the two other teams play with the winners advancing to the championship game. The tournament champion receives an automatic bid to the 1992 NCAA Division I Men's Ice Hockey Tournament.

== Conference standings ==
Note: GP = Games played; W = Wins; L = Losses; T = Ties; PTS = Points; GF = Goals For; GA = Goals Against

1991–92 ECAC Hockey standings
	Conference							Overall					
	GP	W	L	T	PTS	GF	GA	GP	W	L	T	GF	GA
Harvard†	22	13	3	6	32	90	59	27	14	7	6	103	78
St. Lawrence*	22	15	6	1	31	104	66	34	22	10	2	160	109
Clarkson	22	15	6	1	31	101	63	33	22	10	1	165	100
Yale	22	11	4	7	29	103	90	27	13	7	7	121	110
Cornell	22	10	8	4	24	70	59	29	14	11	4	92	78
Brown	22	10	8	4	24	93	86	30	11	15	4	118	135
Vermont	22	10	9	3	23	78	74	31	16	12	3	116	95
Colgate	22	11	11	0	22	105	108	31	14	16	1	152	151
Princeton	22	9	12	1	19	84	91	27	12	14	1	108	116
Rensselaer	22	6	12	4	16	70	89	33	14	15	4	124	128
Dartmouth	22	3	17	2	8	60	116	26	3	21	2	70	142
Union	22	2	19	1	5	61	118	25	3	21	1	82	138
Championship: St. Lawrence † indicates conference regular season champion * indicates conference tournament champion (Whitelaw Cup)

== Bracket ==
Teams are reseeded after the first two rounds

Preliminary Round; March 3
7	Vermont	1
10	Rensselaer	5
8	Colgate	4
9	Princeton	5**

Quarterfinals; March 7
1	Harvard	3
10	Rensselaer	4*
2	St. Lawrence	6
9	Princeton	3
3	Clarkson	8
6	Brown	3
4	Yale	1
5	Cornell	3

Semifinals; March 13
2	St. Lawrence	6**
10	Rensselaer	5
3	Clarkson	3
5	Cornell	4**

Championship; March 14
2	St. Lawrence	4
5	Cornell	2

Note: * denotes overtime period(s)

=== Preliminary round ===
==== (7) Vermont vs. (10) Rensselaer ====
March 3	Vermont	5 – 1	Rensselaer	Gutterson Fieldhouse

==== (8) Colgate vs. (9) Princeton ====
March 3	Colgate	4 – 5	2OT	Princeton	Starr Rink

=== Quarterfinals ===
==== (1) Harvard vs. (10) Rensselaer ====
March 7	Harvard	3 – 4	OT	Rensselaer	Bright Hockey Center

==== (2) St. Lawrence vs. (9) Princeton ====
March 7	St. Lawrence	6 – 3	Princeton	Appleton Arena

==== (3) Clarkson vs. (6) Brown ====
March 7	Clarkson	8 – 3	Brown	Cheel Arena

==== (4) Yale vs. (5) Cornell ====
March 7	Yale	1 – 4	Cornell	Ingalls Rink

=== Semifinals ===
==== (2) St. Lawrence vs. (10) Rensselaer ====
March 13	St. Lawrence	6 – 5	2OT	Rensselaer	Boston Garden

==== (3) Clarkson vs. (5) Cornell ====
March 13	Clarkson	3 – 4	2OT	Cornell	Boston Garden

=== Championship ===
==== (2) St. Lawrence vs. (5) Cornell ====
March 14	St. Lawrence	4 – 2	Cornell	Boston Garden

== Tournament awards ==
=== All-Tournament Team ===
- F Marko Tuomainen (Clarkson)
- F Mike Lappin (St. Lawrence)
- F Chris Wells (St. Lawrence)
- D Chris Lappin (St. Lawrence)
- D Daniel Laperrière* (St. Lawrence)
- G Parris Duffus (Cornell)

* Most Outstanding Player(s)
