= 1975–76 GLJHL season =

- League: Great Lakes Junior Hockey League
- Sport: Ice hockey
- Games: 48
- Teams: 5

Regular season
- Season champions: Detroit Little Caesars

Robertson Cup Playoffs
- Finals champions: Detroit Little Caesars

NAHL seasons
- 1976–77 →

The 1975–76 GLJHL season was the inaugural season of the Great Lakes Junior Hockey League. The Detroit Little Caesars won the regular season championship and the Robertson Cup.

== League founded ==
The Great Lakes Junior Hockey League was founded out of the merger between the Michigan Junior Hockey League and the Wolverine Junior A Hockey League. Both the Detroit Little Caesars and Detroit Jr. Wings were active prior to the start of the league while the history of the other three franchises is uncertain.

== Member changes ==
- The Port Huron Fogcutters withdrew from the league on November 28, 1975. The remainder of their schedule were counted as 1–0 forfeits.

== Regular season ==
The standings at the end of the regular season were as follows:

Note: x = clinched playoff berth; y = clinched regular season title

=== Standings ===
Team	GP	W	L	T	Pts	GF	GA
xy – Detroit Little Caesars	48	35	11	2	72	253	147
x – Detroit Jr. Wings	48	34	11	3	71	234	152
x – Paddock Pool Saints	48	22	19	7	51	191	212
x – Oakland Chiefs	48	19	23	6	44	191	260
Port Huron Fogcutters	48	1	47	0	2	51	149

Note: All games for Port Huron after November 28, 1975 were 1–0 forfeits.

== Robertson Cup playoffs ==
Results missing

Detroit Little Caesars won the Robertson Cup.
