= Derek Smith (ice hockey, born 1954) =

Canadian ice hockey player

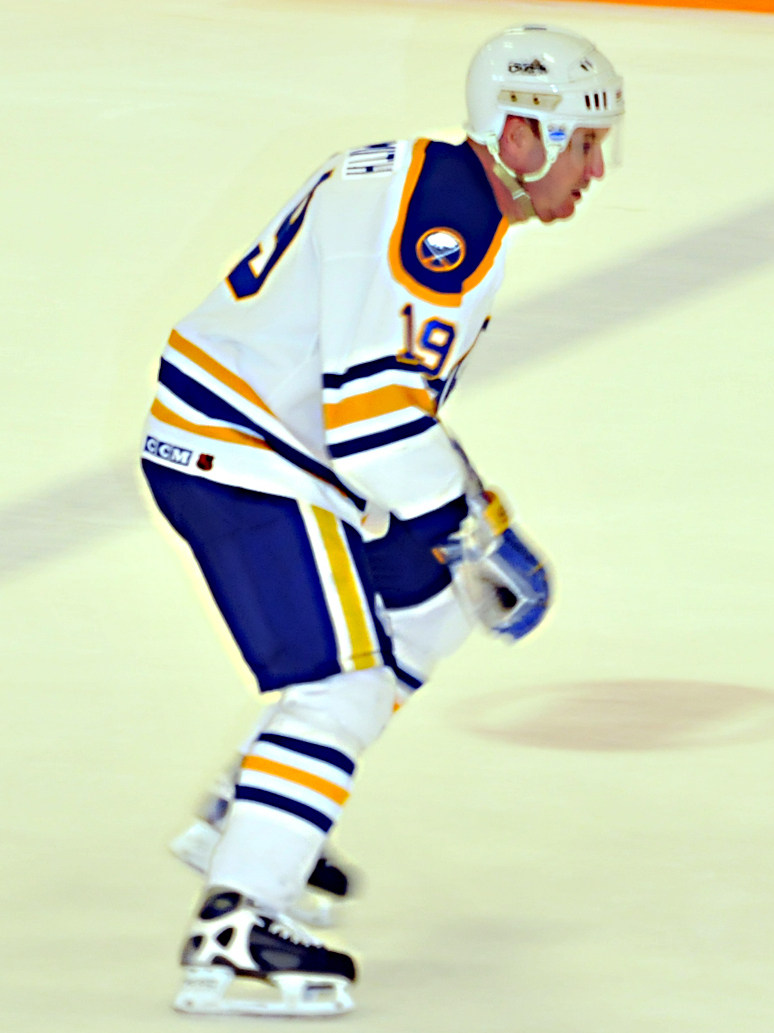
- Smith with the Buffalo Sabres Alumni Hockey Team in 2011
- Born: July 31, 1954 (age 70); Quebec City, Quebec, Canada
- Height: 5 ft 11 in (180 cm)
- Weight: 180 lb (82 kg; 12 st 12 lb)
- Position: Centre/Left wing
- Shot: Left
- Played for: Buffalo Sabres; Detroit Red Wings
- NHL draft: 168th overall, 1974; Buffalo Sabres
- WHA draft: 89th overall, 1974; Houston Aeros
- Playing career: 1974–1984

Derek Robert Smith (born July 31, 1954) is a Canadian former professional ice hockey player who played in the National Hockey League with the Buffalo Sabres and Detroit Red Wings between 1975 and 1983. He was selected by the Sabres in the 1974 NHL Amateur Draft.

== Playing career ==
Smith was born in Quebec City, Quebec, but grew up in Ottawa, Ontario.

Smith played his junior hockey for the Ottawa 67's and scored an impressive 52 goals in the 1972–73 campaign. He backed up the performance with a 47-goal season the next year and this was enough to garner the attention of the Buffalo Sabres who drafted him in the 10th round of the 1974 NHL Amateur Draft.

He spent three seasons with the Hershey Bears of the American Hockey League including a playoff effort in 1975 where he scored seven goals in eleven games. Smith also scored nearly a point a game for the Bears in 1976–77. This is also the year when he made his regular season debut in the NHL, playing in 5 games for the Sabres, after appearing in one playoff game for the Sabres the year before.

In 1977, he became an NHL regular appearing in 36 regular season games and an additional eight playoff games. Smith broke out in the 1979–80 season when he recorded career high 24 goals to go with 39 assists. He also scored 12 points in 13 games. He was a 20-goal scorer the next season. Smith also set a career high with 43 assists in 69 games.

On December 2, 1981, Smith was part of a blockbuster trade that sent him to the Detroit Red Wings, along with Danny Gare and Jim Schoenfeld, in exchange for Dale McCourt, Mike Foligno and Brent Peterson. Smith scored thirteen goals playing for Detroit. He retired from professional hockey in 1984 after scoring 78 goals and 194 points in the NHL.

Smith still resides in the Western New York area and is an active member of the Buffalo Sabres Alumni Association.

== Career statistics ==
=== Regular season and playoffs ===
			Regular season					Playoffs
Season	Team	League	GP	G	A	Pts	PIM	GP	G	A	Pts	PIM
1970–71	Ottawa M&W Rangers	CJHL	—	—	—	—	—	—	—	—	—	—
1971–72	Ottawa 67's	OHA	53	6	11	17	10	18	2	4	6	22
1972–73	Ottawa 67's	OHA	53	52	46	98	32	9	3	4	7	6
1973–74	Ottawa 67's	OHA	69	47	45	92	40	7	0	5	5	0
1974–75	Charlotte Checkers	SHL	4	4	3	7	0	—	—	—	—	—
1974–75	Hershey Bears	AHL	64	11	16	27	10	11	7	3	10	0
1975–76	Buffalo Sabres	NHL	—	—	—	—	—	1	0	0	0	0
1975–76	Hershey Bears	AHL	67	28	32	60	14	10	4	5	9	4
1976–77	Buffalo Sabres	NHL	5	0	0	0	0	—	—	—	—	—
1976–77	Hershey Bears	AHL	65	31	31	62	20	6	3	1	4	2
1977–78	Buffalo Sabres	NHL	36	3	3	6	0	8	3	3	6	7
1977–78	Hershey Bears	AHL	5	2	2	4	2	—	—	—	—	—
1978–79	Buffalo Sabres	NHL	43	14	12	26	8	—	—	—	—	—
1979–80	Buffalo Sabres	NHL	79	24	39	63	16	13	5	7	12	4
1980–81	Buffalo Sabres	NHL	69	21	43	64	12	8	1	4	5	2
1981–82	Buffalo Sabres	NHL	12	3	1	4	2	—	—	—	—	—
1981–82	Detroit Red Wings	NHL	49	6	14	20	10	—	—	—	—	—
1982–83	Detroit Red Wings	NHL	42	7	4	11	12	—	—	—	—	—
1982–83	Adirondack Red Wings	AHL	11	6	4	10	2	6	1	2	3	0
1983–84	Adirondack Red Wings	AHL	61	16	29	45	10	10	1	0	1	0
NHL totals			335	78	116	194	60	30	9	14	23	13
