= 1981–82 GLJHL season =

- League: Great Lakes Junior Hockey League
- Sport: Ice hockey
- Games: 46
- Teams: 5

Regular season
- Season champions: Paddock Pool Saints

Robertson Cup Playoffs
- Finals champions: Paddock Pool Saints

NAHL seasons
- ← 1980–81 1982–83 →

The 1981–82 GLJHL season was the seventh season of the Great Lakes Junior Hockey League. The Paddock Pool Saints won the regular season championship and the Robertson Cup.

== Member changes ==
- The Fraser Flags and the Waterford Lakers joined the league as expansion franchises.

== Regular season ==
The standings at the end of the regular season were as follows:

Note: x = clinched playoff berth; y = clinched regular season title

=== Standings ===
| Team | GP | W | L | T | Pts | GF | GA |
|---|---|---|---|---|---|---|---|
| xy – Paddock Pool Saints | 46 | 33 | 9 | 4 | 70 | 291 | 182 |
| x – Redford Royals | 46 | 30 | 12 | 4 | 64 | 288 | 217 |
| x – Detroit Jr. Wings | 46 | 25 | 18 | 3 | 53 | 259 | 232 |
| x – Waterford Lakers | 46 | 21 | 21 | 4 | 46 | 287 | 267 |
| Fraser Flags | 46 | 6 | 33 | 7 | 19 | 207 | 307 |

== Robertson Cup playoffs ==
Results missing

Paddock Pool Saints won the Robertson Cup.
