= 1977–78 GLJHL season =

- League: Great Lakes Junior Hockey League
- Sport: Ice hockey
- Games: 49–46
- Teams: 5

Regular season
- Season champions: Paddock Pool Saints

Robertson Cup Playoffs
- Finals champions: Paddock Pool Saints

NAHL seasons
- ← 1976–77 1978–79 →

The 1977–78 GLJHL season was the third season of the Great Lakes Junior Hockey League. The Paddock Pool Saints won the regular season championship and the Robertson Cup.

== Member changes ==
None

== Regular season ==
The standings at the end of the regular season were as follows:

Note: x = clinched playoff berth; y = clinched regular season title

=== Standings ===
Team	GP	W	L	T	Pts	GF	GA
xy – Paddock Pool Saints	49	37	9	3	77	383	199
x – Detroit Jr. Wings	49	33	12	4	70	320	212
x – Fraser Highlanders	48	24	19	5	53	271	225
x – Cleveland Jr. Barons	46	17	25	4	38	228	287
Wayne Chiefs	48	11	33	4	26	194	266

== Robertson Cup playoffs ==
Results missing

Paddock Pool Saints won the Robertson Cup.
