= Larry Playfair =

Canadian ice hockey player (born 1958)

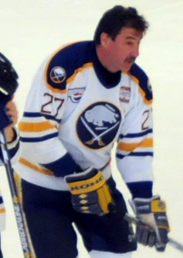
- Playfair with the Buffalo Sabres Alumni Hockey Team in 2011
- Born: June 23, 1958 (age 67) Fort St. James, British Columbia, Canada
- Height: 6 ft 4 in (193 cm)
- Weight: 215 lb (98 kg; 15 st 5 lb)
- Position: Defence
- Shot: Left
- Played for: Buffalo Sabres; Los Angeles Kings
- National team: Canada
- NHL draft: 13th overall, 1978; Buffalo Sabres
- Playing career: 1978–1990

Larry William Playfair (born June 23, 1958) is a Canadian former professional ice hockey player. He played for the Buffalo Sabres and Los Angeles Kings in the NHL and has worked as a color analyst for Sabres television broadcasts since his 1990 retirement due to chronic back problems. Along with his younger brother Jim, Playfair was drafted in the first round of the NHL entry draft (Larry in 1978 and Jim in 1982), and both played junior hockey for the Portland Winter Hawks of the Western Hockey League.

Playfair was president of the Sabres Alumni Association spanning at least December 2007 and March 2012.

== Career statistics ==
=== Regular season and playoffs ===
			Regular season					Playoffs
Season	Team	League	GP	G	A	Pts	PIM	GP	G	A	Pts	PIM
1974–75	Langley Lords	BCHL	—	—	—	—	—	—	—	—	—	—
1974–75	Kamloops Chiefs	WCHL	1	0	0	0	0	—	—	—	—	—
1975–76	Langley Lords	BCHL	72	10	20	30	162	—	—	—	—	—
1975–76	Kamloops Chiefs	WCHL	—	—	—	—	—	3	0	0	0	0
1976–77	Portland Winter Hawks	WCHL	65	2	17	19	199	8	0	0	0	4
1977–78	Portland Winter Hawks	WCHL	71	13	19	32	402	8	0	2	2	58
1978–79	Buffalo Sabres	NHL	26	0	3	3	60	—	—	—	—	—
1978–79	Hershey Bears	AHL	45	0	12	12	148	—	—	—	—	—
1979–80	Buffalo Sabres	NHL	79	2	10	12	145	14	0	2	2	29
1980–81	Buffalo Sabres	NHL	75	3	9	12	169	8	0	0	0	26
1981–82	Buffalo Sabres	NHL	77	6	10	16	258	4	0	0	0	22
1982–83	Buffalo Sabres	NHL	79	4	13	17	180	5	0	1	1	11
1983–84	Buffalo Sabres	NHL	76	5	11	16	211	3	0	0	0	0
1984–85	Buffalo Sabres	NHL	72	3	14	17	157	5	0	3	3	9
1985–86	Buffalo Sabres	NHL	47	1	2	3	100	—	—	—	—	—
1985–86	Los Angeles Kings	NHL	14	0	1	1	28	—	—	—	—	—
1986–87	Los Angeles Kings	NHL	37	2	7	9	181	—	—	—	—	—
1987–88	Los Angeles Kings	NHL	54	0	7	7	197	3	0	0	0	14
1988–89	Los Angeles Kings	NHL	6	0	3	3	16	—	—	—	—	—
1988–89	Buffalo Sabres	NHL	42	0	3	3	110	1	0	0	0	0
1989–90	Buffalo Sabres	NHL	4	0	1	1	2	—	—	—	—	—
NHL totals			688	26	94	120	1814	43	0	6	6	111

== Awards ==
- WCHL First All-Star Team – 1978

== See also ==
- Notable families in the NHL

Preceded by Ric Seiling	Buffalo Sabres first-round draft pick 1978	Succeeded by Mike Ramsey
