= St. Clair Shores Falcons =

- City: St. Clair Shores, Michigan
- League: North American Junior Hockey League
- Founded: 1983
- Folded: 1987
- Colors: Blue and white

Franchise history
- 1983–1986: St. Clair Shores Falcons
- 1986–1987: Detroit Falcons

Championships
- Regular season titles: 2 (1985, 1986)
- Robertson Cups: 2 (1984, 1985)

The St. Clair Shores Falcons were a Junior A ice hockey team that played in the North American Junior Hockey League.

== History ==
In 1983, the Great Lakes Junior Hockey League added the St. Clair Shores Falcons as an expansion franchise. Because the club was sponsored by Datavision, they were sometimes referred to as the 'Data Vision Falcons'. The team was an immediate success and won the league championship in each of its first two seasons.

In the summer of 1984, three of the GLJHL's teams folded, causing the league to collapse. St. Clair and the Buffalo Jr. Sabres banded together and reformed the league as the North American Junior Hockey League. Two years later, the team relocated to the Detroit suburb of Fraser, Michigan and became the Detroit Falcons. However, one year later, the franchise folded.

== Season-by-season records ==
Season	GP	W	L	T	Pts	GF	GA	Finish	Playoffs
St. Clair Shores Falcons
1983–84	50	22	23	5	49	-	-	3rd of 5, GLJHL	Won Robertson Cup
1984–85	24	11	7	6	28	117	113	1st of 3, NAJHL	Won Robertson Cup
1985–86	43	28	12	3	59	254	164	1st of 4, NAJHL	Missing information
Detroit Falcons
1986–87	37	24	9	4	52	223	117	t-1st of 5, NAJHL	Missing information
