= Rem Murray =

- Born: October 9, 1972 (age 53) Stratford, Ontario, Canada
- Height: 6 ft 2 in (188 cm)
- Weight: 195 lb (88 kg; 13 st 13 lb)
- Position: Centre/Left wing
- Shot: Left
- Played for: NHL; Edmonton Oilers; New York Rangers; Nashville Predators; AHL; Cape Breton Oilers; Houston Aeros; Europe; HIFK; HC Innsbruck; HC Pustertal Wölfe
- National team: Canada
- NHL draft: 135th overall, 1992; Los Angeles Kings
- Playing career: 1995–2012

Raymond Joseph "Rem" Murray (born October 9, 1972) is a Canadian former professional ice hockey left winger. Murray was selected in the sixth round, 135th overall in the 1992 NHL entry draft by the Los Angeles Kings, and he played in the National Hockey League (NHL) with the Edmonton Oilers, New York Rangers and Nashville Predators before playing in Europe to finish his career.

== Playing career ==
Murray spent four years at Michigan State where he was a CCHA First Team All-Rookie in 1992 and a CCHA Second Team All-Star in 1995. Unsigned from the Kings, in the summer of 1995, the Edmonton Oilers signed Murray as a free agent and assigned him to their American Hockey League affiliate in Cape Breton where he led the team in scoring as a rookie and finished 14th in AHL scoring with 90 points.

Following a successful rookie season in Cape Breton, Murray joined the Oilers for the 1996–97 season. He spent 6 seasons in Edmonton. This included the 1998–99 campaign where he set career highs for goals (21) and points (39). He was traded to the New York Rangers in 2002. Murray played in 85 games during the 2002–03 season, although the NHL regular season has each team play only 82 regular season games. Murray was traded from the Rangers to the Nashville Predators mid-season.

In 2004, while playing for the Predators, Murray was diagnosed with a rare neck condition, a form of dystonia, which tentatively forced him to retire in 2005. However, after failing a tryout with the Detroit Red Wings, Murray played the 2005–06 season with the Houston Aeros of the AHL, tallying 35 points in 54 games, good enough for Murray's former team, the Edmonton Oilers, to sign him to a contract in March 2006, in time for him to take part in their run to the Stanley Cup Finals.

After two successful seasons in the Finnish SM-liiga (2007, 2008) for IFK Helsinki, Murray signed for HC Innsbruck in the Austrian Hockey League. On July 11, 2009, he signed a contract with Pustertal-Val Pusteria Wolves in the Serie A.

Murray returned to Innsbruck as alternate captain the following season. After two seasons in the 2nd Austrian Hockey League, he helped Innsbruck return to the EBEL. Upon announcing his retirement at the conclusion of the season, Murray's number 17 jersey was retired by Innsbruck at the team's season opener in the 2012–13 campaign.

Murray wore three different numbers while playing with the Edmonton Oilers: #17 (which he had to give up when the Oilers retired Jari Kurri's jersey), #16 (which he asked former captain Kelly Buchberger if he could wear), and #22 (which he wore on his second stint with the Oilers because #16 was already taken by Jarret Stoll).

Murray now has four kids. He is a 2016 Michigan Amateur Hockey Association 30+ Recreational Division State Champion.

== Career statistics ==
=== Regular season and playoffs ===
			Regular season					Playoffs
Season	Team	League	GP	G	A	Pts	PIM	GP	G	A	Pts	PIM
1989–90	Stratford Cullitons	MWJHL	46	19	32	51	48	—	—	—	—	—
1990–91	Stratford Cullitons	MWJHL	48	39	59	98	39	—	—	—	—	—
1991–92	Michigan State Spartans	CCHA	44	13	38	51	18	—	—	—	—	—
1992–93	Michigan State Spartans	CCHA	40	22	35	57	24	—	—	—	—	—
1993–94	Michigan State Spartans	CCHA	41	16	38	54	18	—	—	—	—	—
1994–95	Michigan State Spartans	CCHA	40	20	36	56	21	—	—	—	—	—
1995–96	Cape Breton Oilers	AHL	79	31	59	90	40	—	—	—	—	—
1996–97	Edmonton Oilers	NHL	82	11	20	31	16	12	1	2	3	4
1997–98	Edmonton Oilers	NHL	61	9	9	18	39	11	1	4	5	2
1998–99	Edmonton Oilers	NHL	78	21	18	39	20	4	1	1	2	2
1999–2000	Edmonton Oilers	NHL	44	9	5	14	8	5	0	1	1	2
2000–01	Edmonton Oilers	NHL	82	15	21	36	24	6	2	0	2	6
2001–02	Edmonton Oilers	NHL	69	7	17	24	14	—	—	—	—	—
2001–02	New York Rangers	NHL	11	1	2	3	4	—	—	—	—	—
2002–03	New York Rangers	NHL	32	6	6	12	4	—	—	—	—	—
2002–03	Nashville Predators	NHL	53	6	13	19	18	—	—	—	—	—
2003–04	Nashville Predators	NHL	39	8	9	17	12	—	—	—	—	—
2005–06	Houston Aeros	AHL	54	11	24	35	8	—	—	—	—	—
2005–06	Edmonton Oilers	NHL	9	1	1	2	2	24	0	4	4	2
2006–07	HIFK	SM-l	56	20	26	46	38	5	4	0	4	4
2007–08	HIFK	SM-l	52	17	18	35	62	7	3	2	5	4
2008–09	HC TWK Innsbruck	EBEL	54	19	34	53	50	6	2	0	2	14
2009–10	HC Pustertal Wölfe	ITA	40	14	29	43	40	9	4	6	10	2
2010–11	HC TWK Innsbruck	AUT.2	25	17	39	56	28	5	1	8	9	4
2011–12	HC TWK Innsbruck	AUT.2	32	31	37	68	34	7	2	8	10	37
NHL totals			560	94	121	215	161	62	5	12	17	18

=== International ===
Year	Team	Event	GP	G	A	Pts	PIM
2001	Canada	WC	7	1	3	4	2
Senior totals			7	1	3	4	2

== Championships ==
2016 Michigan Amateur Hockey Association 30+ Recreational Division State Champions

== Awards and honours ==
Award	Year
All-CCHA Rookie Team	1991-92
All-CCHA Second team	1994-95
