= Chicago Young Americans =

- City: Chicago, Illinois
- League: NAJHL
- Founded: 1987
- Folded: 1989
- Colors: Blue and red

Franchise history
- 1987–1989: Chicago Young Americans

The Chicago Young Americans were a Junior A ice hockey team playing in the North American Junior Hockey League.

== History ==
The Chicago Young Americans are a junior ice hockey organization for the greater Chicago area. In 1987, they reached an agreement with the North American Junior Hockey League to join the league as an expansion franchise. Despite finding success in the league, the organization decided to withdraw after two seasons and dissolved the junior A squad.

== Season-by-season records ==
Season	GP	W	L	T	Pts	GF	GA	Finish	Playoffs
1987–88	32	14	13	5	33	144	121	5th of 6, NAJHL	Missing information
1988–89	40	29	8	3	61	252	138	1st of 4, Western Div. 2nd of 8, NAJHL	Missing information
