= Kalamazoo Jr. Wings =

- City: Kalamazoo, Michigan
- League: North American Hockey League
- Founded: 1988
- Operated: 1989–1994
- Folded: 2014
- Colors: Green, gold and black

Franchise history
- 1988–1989: Western Michigan Wolves
- 1989–1994: Kalamazoo Jr. Wings
- 1994–2003: Danville Wings (NAHL)
- 2003–2004: Danville Wings (USHL)
- 2004–2014: Indiana Ice

Championships
- Regular season titles: 1: 1993
- Division titles: 4: 1990, 1991, 1993, 1994
- Robertson Cups: 2: 1991, 1993

The Kalamazoo Jr. Wings were a Tier II ice hockey team that played the North American Hockey League from 1989 until 1994. The team later moved to Danville, Illinois and became the Danville Wings

== History ==
The Western Michigan Wolves were added as an expansion team to the North American Junior Hockey League in 1988. After their first season, the team reached an affiliation agreement with the Kalamazoo Wings and rebranded as the 'Kalamazoo Jr. Wings'. The Jr. Wings were a very successful club during their five year existence and won the Robertson Cup in the 1991 and 1993. The franchise was purchased by rock promoter Jay Goldberg and then relocated to Danville, Illinois after the 1993–94 season.

== Season records ==
| Season | GP | W | L | T | OTL | PTS | GF | GA | PIM | Finish | Playoffs |
Western Michigan Wolves
| 1988–89 | 40 | 12 | 22 | 6 | – | 30 | 187 | 226 | N/A | 3rd of 4, Western; 6th of 8, NAJHL | Missing information |
Kalamazoo Jr. Wings
| 1989–90 | 44 | 27 | 11 | 6 | – | 60 | 256 | 197 | N/A | 1st of 4, Western; 2nd of 8, NAJHL | Missing information |
| 1990–91 | 40 | 26 | 8 | 6 | – | 58 | N/A | N/A | N/A | 1st of 4, Western; 2nd of 8, NAJHL | Won Robertson Cup |
| 1991–92 | 41 | 15 | 22 | 3 | 1 | 34 | 168 | 193 | N/A | 3rd of 4, Western t-5th of 8, NAJHL | Missing information |
| 1992–93 | 40 | 31 | 6 | 3 | 0 | 65 | 230 | 124 | N/A | 1st of 4, Western; 1st of 8, NAHL | Won Robertson Cup |
| 1993–94 | 44 | 26 | 17 | 1 | 0 | 53 | 210 | 190 | N/A | 1st of 5, Western; 3rd of 8, NAHL | Missing information |
