= 1991–92 NCAA Division I men's ice hockey season =

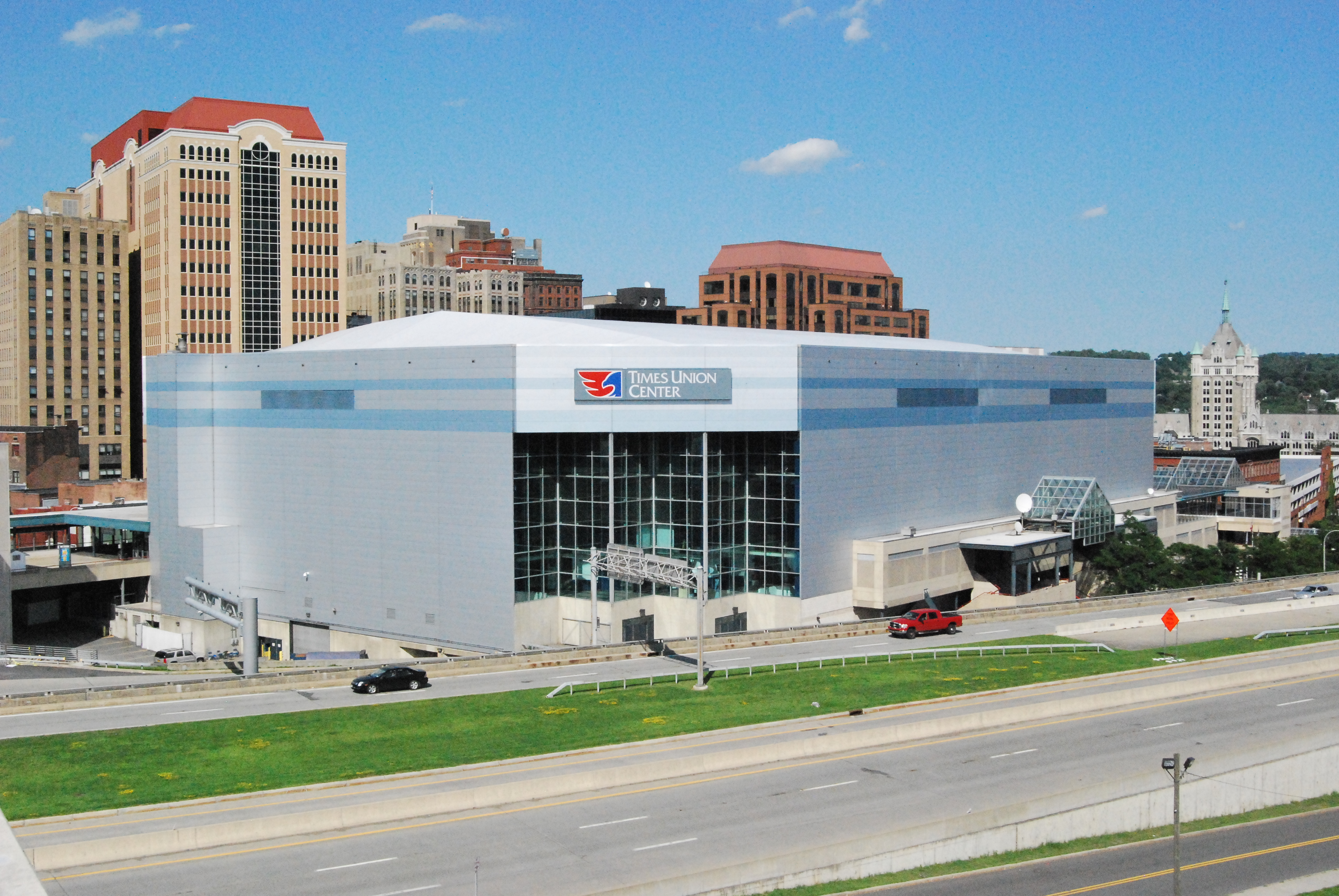
- The Knickerbocker Arena served as the host for the 1992 Frozen Four
- Duration: October 1991 – April 4, 1992
- NCAA tournament: 1992
- National championship: Knickerbocker Arena; Albany, New York
- NCAA champion: Lake Superior State
- Hobey Baker Award: Scott Pellerin (Maine)

The 1991–92 NCAA Division I men's ice hockey season began in October 1991 and concluded with the 1992 NCAA Division I men's ice hockey tournament's championship game on April 4, 1992, at the Knickerbocker Arena in Albany, New York. This was the 45th season in which an NCAA ice hockey championship was held and is the 98th year overall where an NCAA school fielded a team.

Massachusetts–Lowell was placed on probation for 2 years and was banned from the NCAA tournament for this year due to NCAA rules violations.

Terry Slater, the head coach of Colgate, died on December 6, four days after suffering a stroke.

== Season Outlook ==
=== Pre-season polls ===
The top teams in the nation as ranked before the start of the season.

The WMPL poll was voted on by coaches. The WMEB was voted on by media. The Times Union poll was voted on by coaches, media, and NHL scouts.

WMPL Poll
Rank	Team
1	Maine (5)
2	Michigan (4)
3	Northern Michigan (1)
4	Minnesota
5	Clarkson
6	Providence
7	North Dakota
8	Lake Superior State
9	Bowling Green
10	Boston University

WMEB Poll
Rank	Team
1	Maine (8)
2	Michigan (2)
3	Northern Michigan
4	Clarkson
5	Providence
6	Minnesota
7	North Dakota
8	Lake Superior State
9	Boston University
10	Bowling Green
11	St. Lawrence
12	Wisconsin
13	New Hampshire
14	Harvard
15	Boston College

Times Union Poll
Rank	Team
1	Maine (10)
2	Northern Michigan (4)
3	Michigan (6)
4	Minnesota (2)
5	Clarkson (1)
6	Providence (2)
7	Lake Superior State
8	North Dakota
9	Boston University
10	St. Lawrence

== Regular season ==
=== Season tournaments ===
Tournament	Dates	Teams	Champion
USAir Hockey Classic	November 1–2	4	Massachusetts–Lowell
Ottawa University Invitational	November 29–30	4	
Great Western Freeze–Out	December 19–20	4	Maine
Jeep/Nissan Classic	December 20–21	4	Northern Michigan
Mariucci Classic	December 21–22	4	Minnesota
Badger Showdown	December 27–28	4	Wisconsin
Great Lakes Invitational	December 27–28	4	Michigan
Rensselaer Holiday Tournament	December 27–28	4	St. Lawrence
Syracuse Invitational	December 27–28	4	Ohio State
Auld Lang Syne Tournament	December 28–29	4	Boston University
Dexter Shoe Classic	January 3–4	4	Maine
Beanpot	February 3, 10	4	Boston University

=== Standings ===
1991–92 Central Collegiate Hockey Association standings
	Conference							Overall					
	GP	W	L	T	PTS	GF	GA	GP	W	L	T	GF	GA
Michigan†	32	22	7	3	47	150	104	44	32	9	3	215	144
Lake Superior State*	32	20	8	4	44	141	78	43	30	9	4	203	100
Michigan State	32	18	7	7	43	149	105	44	26	10	8	199	143
Western Michigan	32	14	12	6	34	119	114	36	16	14	6	140	130
Miami	32	12	14	6	30	124	145	40	18	16	6	165	183
Ferris State	32	11	15	6	28	102	127	38	13	18	7	119	148
Illinois-Chicago	32	8	18	6	22	101	132	36	10	20	6	123	152
Ohio State	32	8	19	5	21	134	182	38	12	21	5	162	211
Bowling Green	32	7	20	5	19	123	156	34	8	21	5	133	165
Championship: Lake Superior State † indicates conference regular season champion * indicates conference tournament champion

1991–92 ECAC Hockey standings
	Conference							Overall					
	GP	W	L	T	PTS	GF	GA	GP	W	L	T	GF	GA
Harvard†	22	13	3	6	32	90	59	27	14	7	6	103	78
St. Lawrence*	22	15	6	1	31	104	66	34	22	10	2	160	109
Clarkson	22	15	6	1	31	101	63	33	22	10	1	165	100
Yale	22	11	4	7	29	103	90	27	13	7	7	121	110
Cornell	22	10	8	4	24	70	59	29	14	11	4	92	78
Brown	22	10	8	4	24	93	86	30	11	15	4	118	135
Vermont	22	10	9	3	23	78	74	31	16	12	3	116	95
Colgate	22	11	11	0	22	105	108	31	14	16	1	152	151
Princeton	22	9	12	1	19	84	91	27	12	14	1	108	116
Rensselaer	22	6	12	4	16	70	89	33	14	15	4	124	128
Dartmouth	22	3	17	2	8	60	116	26	3	21	2	70	142
Union	22	2	19	1	5	61	118	25	3	21	1	82	138
Championship: St. Lawrence † indicates conference regular season champion * indicates conference tournament champion (Whitelaw Cup)

1991–92 Hockey East standings
	Conference							Overall					
	GP	W	L	T	PTS	GF	GA	GP	W	L	T	GF	GA
New Hampshire	21	15	4	2	32	94	75	37	24	11	2	168	127
Boston University	21	11	6	4	26	92	88	35	23	8	4	159	124
Maine†*^	21	12	7	2	26	115	54	37	18	17	2	194	89
Providence	21	11	8	2	24	99	79	36	21	13	2	175	134
Boston College	21	10	9	2	22	68	76	36	15	18	3	116	138
Massachusetts–Lowell	21	6	11	4	16	75	91	34	11	19	4	127	155
Northeastern	21	7	14	0	14	70	103	35	16	19	0	142	167
Merrimack	21	4	17	0	8	60	102	34	13	21	0	128	149
Championship: Maine † indicates conference regular season champion * indicates conference tournament champion^ After the season Maine was required to retroactively forfeit 13 games for using a player deemed ineligible by the NCAA

1991–92 NCAA Division I Independent ice hockey standings
	Conference							Overall					
	GP	W	L	T	PTS	GF	GA	GP	W	L	T	GF	GA
Air Force	0	0	0	0	-	-	-	34	14	20	0	138	149
Alabama–Huntsville	0	0	0	0	-	-	-	27	16	10	1	161	148
Alaska–Anchorage	0	0	0	0	-	-	-	36	27	8	1	193	124
Alaska–Fairbanks	0	0	0	0	-	-	-	35	7	27	1	-	-
Army	0	0	0	0	-	-	-	31	13	17	1	138	163
Kent State	0	0	0	0	-	-	-	31	15	14	2	143	137
Notre Dame	0	0	0	0	-	-	-	31	12	18	1	107	142

1991–92 Western Collegiate Hockey Association standings
	Conference							Overall					
	GP	W	L	T	PTS	GF	GA	GP	W	L	T	GF	GA
Minnesota†	32	26	6	0	52	163	89	44	33	11	0	215	132
Wisconsin	32	19	11	2	40	129	106	43	27	14	2	175	142
Northern Michigan*	32	17	12	3	37	184	133	42	25	14	3	238	165
Colorado College	32	14	14	4	32	138	141	41	18	18	5	170	175
Minnesota-Duluth	32	14	16	2	30	124	137	37	15	20	2	144	162
Michigan Tech	32	14	17	1	29	114	137	39	16	22	1	141	177
St. Cloud State	32	12	19	1	25	120	138	37	14	21	2	150	159
North Dakota	32	12	19	1	25	137	172	39	17	21	1	170	199
Denver	32	8	22	2	18	110	166	36	9	25	2	124	187
Championship: Northern Michigan † indicates conference regular season champion * indicates conference tournament champion

=== Final regular season polls ===
The final polls were released before the conference tournaments.

WMPL Coaches Poll
Ranking	Team
1	Maine (8)
2	Minnesota (2)
3	Michigan
4	Wisconsin
5	Michigan State
6	Lake Superior State
7	Boston University
8	Northern Michigan
9	St. Lawrence
10	New Hampshire

Times Union Poll
Ranking	Team
1	Maine (23)
2	Minnesota (2)
3	Michigan
4	Wisconsin
5	Michigan State
6	Boston University
7	Lake Superior State
8	New Hampshire
9	Northern Michigan
10	St. Lawrence

== 1992 NCAA tournament ==
Regional Quarterfinals; March 26–27
E1	Maine	–
–	bye	–
East Regional
E4	Boston University	2
E5	Michigan State	4
W2	Minnesota	–
–	bye	–
West Regional
W3	Lake Superior State	7
W6	Alaska-Anchorage	3
W1	Michigan	–
–	bye	–
West Regional
W4	Northern Michigan	8
W5	Clarkson	4
E2	St. Lawrence	–
–	bye	–
East Regional
E3	New Hampshire	2
E6	Wisconsin	4

Regional semifinals March 28–29
E1	Maine	2
E5	Michigan State	3
W2	Minnesota	3
W3	Lake Superior State	8
W1	Michigan	7
W4	Northern Michigan	6
E2	St. Lawrence	2
E6	Wisconsin	5

Frozen Four; April 2
E5	Michigan State	2
W3	Lake Superior State	4
E6	Wisconsin	4
W1	Michigan	2

National championship April 4
W3	Lake Superior State	5
E6	Wisconsin	3

Note: * denotes overtime period(s)

== Player stats ==
=== Scoring leaders ===
The following players led the league in points at the conclusion of the season.

GP = Games played; G = Goals; A = Assists; Pts = Points; PIM = Penalty minutes

Player	Class	Team	GP	G	A	Pts	PIM
Denny Felsner	Senior	Michigan	44	42	52	94	46
Jim Hiller	Junior	Northern Michigan	41	31	55	86	119
Dwayne Norris	Senior	Michigan State	44	44	39	83	62
Dallas Drake	Senior	Northern Michigan	40	39	44	83	58
Mark Beaufait	Senior	Northern Michigan	41	31	50	81	47
Larry Olimb	Senior	Minnesota	44	24	56	80	32
Peter White	Senior	Michigan State	44	26	51	77	32
Scott Beattie	Junior	Northern Michigan	40	28	46	74	80
Greg Johnson	Junior	North Dakota	39	20	54	74	8
Mike Boback	Senior	Providence	36	24	48	72	34

=== Leading goaltenders ===
The following goaltenders led the league in goals against average at the end of the regular season while playing at least 33% of their team's total minutes.

GP = Games played; Min = Minutes played; W = Wins; L = Losses; OT = Overtime/shootout losses; GA = Goals against; SO = Shutouts; SV% = Save percentage; GAA = Goals against average

Player	Class	Team	GP	Min	W	L	OT	GA	SO	SV%	GAA
Darrin Madeley	Junior	Lake Superior State	38	2144	25	6	4	64	2	.917	2.07
Garth Snow	Junior	Maine	31	1792	25	4	2	73	2	.883	2.44
Parris Duffus	Freshman	Cornell	28	1677	14	11	3	74	1	.913	2.65
Christian Soucy	Freshman	Vermont	30	1783	15	11	3	81	0	.910	2.73
Steve Shields	Sophomore	Michigan	37	2091	27	7	2	99	0	.885	2.81
Jason Currie	Sophomore	Clarkson	18	965	11	6	1	42	2	.912	2.88
Jeff Stolp	Senior	Minnesota	36	2017	26	9	0	98	2	.882	2.91
Paul Spagnoletti	Sophomore	St. Lawrence	25	1472	16	6	2	73	2	.896	2.98
Chris Rogles	Junior	Clarkson	18	974	11	3	0	49	0	.904	3.07
Mike Gilmour	Senior	Michigan State	33	1831	14	9	7	95	0	.877	3.07

== Awards ==
=== NCAA ===
Award		Recipient
Hobey Baker Memorial Award		Scott Pellerin, Maine
Spencer Penrose Award		Ron Mason, Michigan State
Most Outstanding Player in NCAA Tournament		Paul Constantin, Lake Superior State
AHCA All-American Teams
East First Team	Position	West First Team
Parris Duffus, Cornell	G	Darrin Madeley, Lake Superior State
Mike Brewer, Brown	D	Mark Astley, Lake Superior State
Daniel Laperrière, St. Lawrence	D	Joby Messier, Michigan State
Scott Pellerin, Maine	F	Dallas Drake, Northern Michigan
David Sacco, Boston University	F	Denny Felsner, Michigan
Jean-Yves Roy, Maine	F	Dwayne Norris, Michigan State
East Second Team	Position	West Second Team
Scott LaGrand, Boston College	G	Duane Derksen, Wisconsin
Christian Soucy, Vermont	G	
Tom Dion, Boston University	D	Chris Hynnes, Colorado College
Rob Gaudreau, Providence	D	Doug Zmolek, Michigan State
Domenic Amodeo, New Hampshire	F	Jim Hiller, Northern Michigan
Dale Band, Colgate	F	Greg Johnson, North Dakota
Mike Lappin, St. Lawrence	F	Larry Olimb, Minnesota

=== CCHA ===
Awards		Recipient
Player of the Year		Dwayne Norris, Michigan State
Best Defensive Forward		Pat Ferschweiler, Western Michigan
Best Defensive Defenseman		Joby Messier, Michigan State
Best Offensive Defenseman		Mark Astley, Lake Superior State
Rookie of the Year		Brian Loney, Ohio State
Coach of the Year		George Gwozdecky, Miami
Most Valuable Player in Tournament		Darrin Madeley, Lake Superior State
All-CCHA Teams
First Team	Position	Second Team
Darrin Madeley, Lake Superior State	G	Jon Hillebrandt, Illinois-Chicago
Mark Astley, Lake Superior State	D	Joe Cook, Miami
Joby Messier, Michigan State	D	Steve Barnes, Lake Superior State
Denny Felsner, Michigan	F	Sandy Moger, Lake Superior State
Dwayne Norris, Michigan State	F	Peter Homles, Bowling Green
Keith Jones, Western Michigan	F	Martin Jiranek, Bowling Green
Rookie Team	Position	
Jon Hillebrandt, Illinois-Chicago	G	
Chris Belanger, Western Michigan	D	
Dan Daikawa, Miami	D	
Brian Loney, Ohio State	F	
Rem Murray, Michigan State	F	
Steve Suk, Michigan State	F	

=== ECAC ===
Award		Recipient
Player of the Year		Daniel Laperrière, St. Lawrence
Rookie of the Year		Christian Soucy, Vermont
Coach of the Year		Tim Taylor, Yale
Most Outstanding Player in Tournament		Daniel Laperrière, St. Lawrence
All-ECAC Hockey Teams
First Team	Position	Second Team
Christian Soucy, Vermont	G	Parris Duffus, Cornell
Mike Brewer, Brown	D	Stephane Robitaille, Rensselaer
Daniel Laperrière, St. Lawrence	D	Jack Duffy, Yale
Dale Band, Colgate	F	Derek Chauvette, Brown
Mark Kaufmann, Yale	F	Andre Faust, Princeton
Mike Lappin, St. Lawrence	F	Hugo Belanger, Clarkson
Rookie Team	Position	
Christian Soucy, Vermont	G	
Luigi Villa, Union	G	
Brad Dexter, Colgate	D	
Brian Mueller, Clarkson	D	
Mike Traggio, Brown	F	
Wayne Clarke, Rensselaer	F	
Ben Coughlin, Harvard	F	
Dominique Ducharme, Vermont	F	
Ron Fogarty, Colgate	F	
Craig Hamelin, Rensselaer	F	
Brad Konik, Harvard	F	
Todd Marchant, Clarkson	F	
Steve Martins, Harvard	F	
Patrice Robitaille, Clarkson	F	
Marko Tuomainen, Clarkson	F	
Pat Turcotte, Dartmouth	F	

=== Hockey East ===
Award		Recipient
Player of the Year		Scott Pellerin, Maine
Rookie of the Year		Craig Darby, Providence
Rookie of the Year		Ian Moran, Boston College
Bob Kullen Coach of the Year Award		Jack Parker, Boston University
Len Ceglarski Sportsmanship Award		Joe Flanagan, New Hampshire
William Flynn Tournament Most Valuable Player		Scott Pellerin, Maine
All-Hockey East Teams
First Team	Position	Second Team
Mark Richards, Massachusetts-Lowell	G	Garth Snow, Maine
Tom Dion, Boston University	D	Chris Imes, Maine
Rob Gaudreau, Providence	D	Kevin O'Sullivan, Boston University
Mike Boback, Providence	F	Jim Montgomery, Maine
Scott Pellerin, Maine	F	Scott Morrow, New Hampshire
David Sacco, Boston University	F	Jean-Yves Roy, Maine
Rookie Team	Position	
Todd Reynolds, Northeastern	G	
Ian Moran, Boston College	D	
Rich Brennan, Boston University	D	
Craig Darby, Providence	F	
John Lilley, Boston University	F	
Mike Pendergast, Boston University	F	

=== WCHA ===
Award		Recipient
Player of the Year		Duane Derksen, Wisconsin
Rookie of the Year		Darby Hendrickson, Minnesota
Student-Athlete of the Year		Geoff Sarjeant, Michigan Tech
Coach of the Year		Brad Buetow, Colorado College
Most Valuable Player in Tournament		Corwin Saurdiff, Northern Michigan
All-WCHA Teams
First Team	Position	Second Team
Duane Derksen, Wisconsin	G	Jeff Stolp, Minnesota
Greg Andrusak, Minnesota-Duluth	D	Travis Richards, Minnesota
Chris Hynnes, Colorado College	D	Doug Zmolek, Minnesota
Greg Johnson, North Dakota	F	Dixon Ward, North Dakota
Larry Olimb, Minnesota	F	Derek Plante, Minnesota-Duluth
Dallas Drake, Northern Michigan	F	Jim Hiller, Northern Michigan
Rookie Team	Position	
Corwin Saurdiff, Northern Michigan	G	
Jason Helr, Northern Michigan	D	
Kent Fearns, Colorado College	D	
Brian Rafalski, Wisconsin	D	
Sandy Gasseau, St. Cloud State	F	
Steve Magnusson, Minnesota	F	
Darby Hendrickson, Minnesota	F	

== 1992 NHL entry draft ==
Round	Pick	Player	College	Conference	NHL team
1	7	Ryan Sittler ^{†}	Michigan	CCHA	Philadelphia Flyers
1	13	Joe Hulbig ^{†}	Providence	Hockey East	Edmonton Oilers
1	24	Peter Ferraro ^{†}	Maine	Hockey East	New York Rangers
2	30	Chris O'Sullivan ^{†}	Boston University	Hockey East	Calgary Flames
2	32	Jim Carey ^{†}	Wisconsin	WCHA	Washington Capitals
4	85	Chris Ferraro ^{†}	Maine	Hockey East	New York Rangers
4	94	Scott McCabe ^{†}	Lake Superior State	CCHA	New Jersey Devils
5	100	Charlie Wasley ^{†}	Minnesota	WCHA	Quebec Nordiques
5	106	Chris de Ruiter ^{†}	Clarkson	ECAC Hockey	Toronto Maple Leafs
5	110	Brian Loney	Ohio State	CCHA	Vancouver Canucks
5	113	Tim Hogan	Michigan	CCHA	Chicago Blackhawks
5	116	Don Chase ^{†}	Boston College	Hockey East	Montreal Canadiens
5	117	Adrian Aucoin	Boston University	Hockey East	Vancouver Canucks
5	118	Mike Sullivan ^{†}	New Hampshire	Hockey East	Detroit Red Wings
6	121	Al Sinclair	Michigan	CCHA	Ottawa Senators
6	124	Paxton Schulte ^{‡}	North Dakota	WCHA	Quebec Nordiques
6	134	Bob Lachance ^{†}	Boston University	Hockey East	St. Louis Blues
6	135	Rem Murray	Michigan State	CCHA	Los Angeles Kings
6	138	Dan Trebil ^{†}	Minnesota	WCHA	New Jersey Devils
6	141	Jason Clark ^{†}	Bowling Green	CCHA	Vancouver Canucks
6	144	Davide Dal Grande ^{†}	Notre Dame	Independent	New York Rangers
7	151	Kirk Daubenspeck ^{†}	Wisconsin	WCHA	Philadelphia Flyers
7	154	Kyle Peterson ^{†}	Michigan Tech	WCHA	Minnesota North Stars
7	168	Matt Oates	Miami	CCHA	New York Rangers
8	169	Jay Kenney ^{†}	Providence	Hockey East	Ottawa Senators
8	174	Ryan Mulhern ^{†}	Brown	ECAC Hockey	Calgary Flames
8	181	Kyuin Shim ^{†}	Northern Michigan	WCHA	Edmonton Oilers
8	182	Nick Naumenko ^{†}	North Dakota	WCHA	St. Louis Blues
8	183	Justin Krall ^{†}	Miami	CCHA	Detroit Red Wings
8	187	Fran Bussey ^{†}	Wisconsin	WCHA	Pittsburgh Penguins
8	190	Colin Schmidt ^{†}	Colorado College	WCHA	Edmonton Oilers
8	192	Mickey Elick ^{†}	Wisconsin	WCHA	New York Rangers
9	195	Chris Burns ^{†}	Denver	WCHA	San Jose Sharks
9	197	Wayne Clarke	Rensselaer	ECAC Hockey	Toronto Maple Leafs
9	198	Brandon Carper	Bowling Green	CCHA	Calgary Flames
9	201	Greg Zwakman ^{†}	Minnesota	WCHA	Hartford Whalers
9	205	Marko Tuomainen	Clarkson	ECAC Hockey	Edmonton Oilers
9	209	David Hymovitz ^{†}	Boston College	Hockey East	Chicago Blackhawks
9	211	Brian Bonin ^{†}	Minnesota	WCHA	Pittsburgh Penguins
9	212	Earl Cronan ^{†}	Colgate	ECAC Hockey	Montreal Canadiens
9	216	Dan Brierly ^{†}	Yale	ECAC Hockey	New York Rangers
10	220	Anson Carter ^{†}	Michigan State	CCHA	Quebec Nordiques
10	224	David Wainwright ^{†}	Boston College	Hockey East	New York Islanders
10	225	Steven Halko ^{†}	Michigan	CCHA	Hartford Whalers
10	226	Jeff Romfo ^{†}	Minnesota–Duluth	WCHA	Minnesota North Stars
10	235	Brian Callahan ^{†}	Boston College	Hockey East	Pittsburgh Penguins
10	236	Trent Cavicchi ^{†}	New Hampshire	Hockey East	Montreal Canadiens
10	238	Dan McGillis ^{†}	Northeastern	Hockey East	Detroit Red Wings
10	239	Greg Callahan ^{†}	Boston College	Hockey East	Washington Capitals
11	244	Aaron Ellis ^{†}	Bowling Green	CCHA	Quebec Nordiques
11	250	Jeff Moen ^{†}	Minnesota	WCHA	Minnesota North Stars
11	259	Wade Salzman ^{†}	Notre Dame	Independent	St. Louis Blues
11	262	Ryan Bach ^{†}	Colorado College	WCHA	Detroit Red Wings

† incoming freshman
‡ Schulte had left school the year before

== See also ==
- 1991–92 NCAA Division III men's ice hockey season
