= NACE (NAHL) =

- City: Redford, Michigan
- League: NAJHL
- Founded: 1985
- Folded: 1990

Franchise history
- 1985–1987: Hennessey Engineers
- 1987–1989: Redford Royals
- 1989–1990: NACE

NACE was a Junior A ice hockey team playing in the North American Junior Hockey League. The team was based in Redford, Michigan.

== History ==
In 1985, Tim Hennessey founded a junior ice hockey team in Redford, Michigan and joined the North American Junior Hockey League. He donated his name to club, calling them the Hennessey Engineers. After two seasons, the team rebranded as the Redford Royals, taking on the same name as a previous junior team that played in the NAJHL's predecessor. After two more years, the club switched names again become NACE (sometimes referred to as Redford NACE). The franchise' fifth season was its last and the club dissolved in 1990.

== Season-by-season records ==
| Season | GP | W | L | T | Pts | GF | GA | Finish | Playoffs |
|---|---|---|---|---|---|---|---|---|---|
Hennessey Engineers
| 1985–86 | 43 | 24 | 14 | 5 | 53 | 252 | 203 | 2nd of 4, NAJHL | Missing information |
| 1986–87 | 37 | 14 | 16 | 7 | 35 | 165 | 154 | 3rd of 5, NAJHL | Missing information |
Redford Royals
| 1987–88 | 32 | 14 | 12 | 6 | 34 | 160 | 150 | 4th of 6, NAJHL | Missing information |
| 1988–89 | 40 | 15 | 18 | 7 | 37 | 165 | 197 | 2nd of 4, Western Div. 5th of 8, NAJHL | Missing information |
NACE
| 1989–90 | 44 | 16 | 19 | 9 | 41 | 207 | 225 | 2nd of 4, Western Div. 5th of 8, NAJHL | Missing information |
