= Ric Seiling =

Canadian ice hockey player (born 1957)

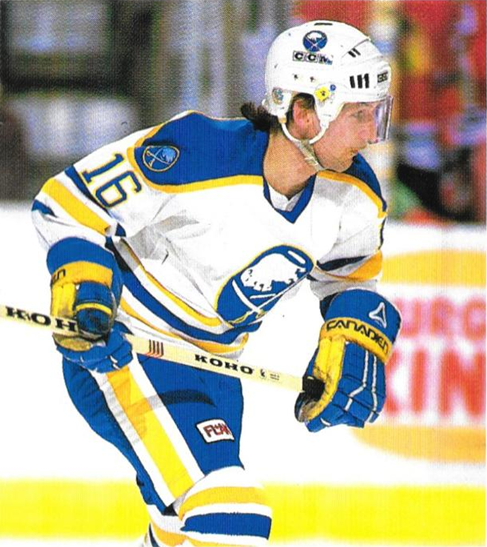
- Born: December 15, 1957 (age 68) Elmira, Ontario, Canada
- Height: 6 ft 1 in (185 cm)
- Weight: 180 lb (82 kg; 12 st 12 lb)
- Position: Right wing
- Shot: Right
- Played for: Buffalo Sabres; Detroit Red Wings
- NHL draft: 14th overall, 1977; Buffalo Sabres
- WHA draft: 55th overall, 1977; Winnipeg Jets
- Playing career: 1977–1988

Richard James Seiling (born December 15, 1957) is a Canadian former professional ice hockey player. He spent the majority of his 738-game National Hockey League (NHL) career with the Buffalo Sabres, but also played one season for the Detroit Red Wings. After his retirement he became a successful harness racer, coach, and broadcaster.

== Junior career ==
Seiling, at 16, joined the Hamilton Fincups of the Ontario Major Junior Hockey League at the start of the 1974–75 season. He spent three seasons with the franchise, which moved to St. Catharines in 1976, amassing 117 goals and 142 assists in 189 regular season games. The Fincups played in the 1976 Memorial Cup, where Seiling posted three goals and nine points in three appearances, leading all players in scoring and earning a berth on the Memorial Cup all-star team.

The following season, his last in junior, Seiling was selected to play for Canada's national junior squad, winning a silver medal while scoring three goals and three assists in seven games. Teammates on the Canadian roster that year included future number one draft picks Dale McCourt and Rob Ramage, as well as Ron Duguay, John Anderson, Dave Hunter and Al Secord.

== NHL career ==
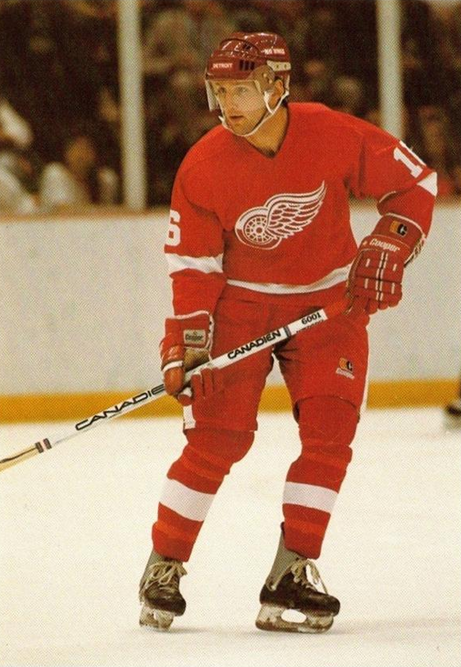
1986 photo of Seiling for Detroit Red Wings

Seiling was drafted 14th overall by the Buffalo Sabres in the 1977 NHL amateur draft. Seiling played all 80 games during his rookie season of 1977–78, scoring 19 goals and 19 assists for 38 points. His goal total increased for the next three seasons, when he peaked with a career-high 30 in 1980–81. He spent five more seasons with the Sabres, but was dealt to the Detroit Red Wings on October 7, 1986, where he played his final year in the NHL. He totaled 179 goals and 208 assists for 387 points in his career. He also picked up 573 penalty minutes. In 62 playoff games he had 14 goals and 14 assists for 28 points.

Seiling was sent to the American Hockey League's Adirondack Red Wings in 1987–88, and retired after a season spent as a player-assistant coach.

== Coaching career ==
He returned to coaching in 1994 with the Utica Blizzard of the Colonial Hockey League, leading the team to a 31–38–5 record and an eventual first round loss in the postseason. Seiling also played as a replacement player in one game, as an emergency replacement of a replaced player in the lineup that required replacing.

The following year he took the reins of the Ontario Hockey League's Owen Sound Platers, but was replaced midway through the year.

He spent parts of the next three seasons behind the bench in the Central Hockey League, first with San Antonio and later with the Tulsa Oilers.

During the inaugural season of the NWHL's Buffalo Beauts, Seiling was the co-coach along with Shelley Looney. For the 2016–17 Buffalo Beauts season, Seiling was named the general manager. He was fired on December 7, 2018.

== Broadcasting ==
Seiling is a color analyst for the Rochester Americans broadcasts on MSG Western New York and WROC.

== Personal life ==
Seiling has four children: Melody, Krystal, Zachary and Jeremy. He is the younger brother of fellow long-time NHL player Rod Seiling.

== Career statistics ==
=== Regular season and playoffs ===
			Regular season					Playoffs
Season	Team	League	GP	G	A	Pts	PIM	GP	G	A	Pts	PIM
1974–75	Hamilton Fincups	OMJHL	68	33	30	63	74	17	13	5	18	25
1975–76	Hamilton Fincups	OMJHL	59	35	51	86	49	14	14	13	27	19
1976–77	St. Catharines Fincups	OMJHL	62	50	61	111	103	14	6	6	12	36
1977–78	Buffalo Sabres	NHL	80	19	19	38	33	8	0	2	2	7
1978–79	Buffalo Sabres	NHL	78	20	22	42	56	3	0	1	1	2
1979–80	Buffalo Sabres	NHL	80	25	35	60	54	14	5	4	9	6
1980–81	Buffalo Sabres	NHL	74	30	27	57	80	8	2	2	4	2
1981–82	Buffalo Sabres	NHL	57	22	25	47	58	4	1	1	2	2
1982–83	Buffalo Sabres	NHL	75	19	22	41	41	10	2	3	5	6
1983–84	Buffalo Sabres	NHL	78	13	22	35	42	3	0	0	0	2
1984–85	Buffalo Sabres	NHL	73	16	15	31	86	5	4	1	5	4
1985–86	Buffalo Sabres	NHL	69	12	13	25	74	—	—	—	—	—
1986–87	Detroit Red Wings	NHL	74	3	8	11	49	—	—	—	—	—
1987–88	Adirondack Red Wings	AHL	70	16	13	29	34	9	2	2	4	4
1994–95	Utica Blizzard	CoHL	1	0	0	0	0	—	—	—	—	—
NHL totals			738	179	208	387	573	62	14	14	28	36

=== International ===
Year	Team	Event	GP	G	A	Pts	PIM
1977	Canada	WJC	7	3	1	4	10
Junior totals			7	3	1	4	10

Preceded by Bob Sauvé	Buffalo Sabres first-round draft pick 1977	Succeeded by Larry Playfair
Preceded by Position created; Shelley Looney (co-coach through 2016)	Buffalo Beauts head coach 2016-2018	Succeeded by Cody McCormick
