= Buffalo Jr. Sabres =

- City: Buffalo, New York, United States
- League: Ontario Junior Hockey League
- Founded: 1975
- Home arena: LECOM Harborcenter
- Colors: Blue, yellow, white
- Owners: Buffalo Sabres Alumni Association (Kevyn Adams, president)
- General manager: Sean Wallace
- Head coach: Sean Wallace

Franchise history
- 1975–1986: Buffalo Jr. Sabres
- 1987–1998: Niagara Scenic
- 1998–2005: Buffalo Lightning
- 2005–Present: Buffalo Jr. Sabres

The Buffalo Jr. Sabres are a Junior "A" ice hockey team from Buffalo, New York. They are part of the Ontario Junior A Hockey League. Its current general manager is Sean Wallace.

== History ==
This franchise was established in Buffalo, New York, in 1975 when the Buffalo Jr. Sabres joined the New York/Pennsylvania Junior Hockey League, taking the place of the departing franchise West Seneca Cougars. During its history, a half-dozen former Buffalo Sabres of the National Hockey League served as head coach or assistant coach. Larry Mickey coached from 1977 to the end of the 1979 season. The following year the Junior Sabres were led by Jim Lorentz. Lorentz coached the team from the 1978-79 season to the 1981–82. Former NHL 1st round draft choice Morris Titanic took over the team for the 1982–83 season and coached until 1985. Ric Seiling served during an assistant coach briefly.

The team continued in various leagues, including The Western New York Junior Hockey League, The North American Hockey League and the Golden Horseshoe Junior B Hockey League, before suspending operations for one season after the 1985–1986 season. The 1985–86 season saw Buffalo balance a schedule between the Ontario Hockey Association's Golden Horseshoe league and a split season with the NAHL.

In the 1987–1988 season the team began operating again headed by Kris Hicks (Head Coach) and Chuck Giambra (General Manager). They were now known as the Niagara Scenic and were playing a full schedule in the North American Hockey League. The team moved to the Eastern Junior Hockey League for the 1994–1995 season and then joined the Metro Junior A Hockey League beginning in 1995–1996. After the Metro folded, the Scenics moved into the Ontario Provincial Junior Hockey League beginning with the 1998-99 season. Heading into the 1999–2000 season, the franchise renamed itself the Buffalo Lightning. In 2005, the Lightning made a deal with the National Hockey League's Buffalo Sabres to restore the name "Junior Sabres" and again wear the Sabres' classic Blue and Gold jerseys.

In 2008 the Buffalo Jr. Sabres were bought out by the Buffalo Sabres and the Buffalo Sabres Alumni Association. Former Buffalo Sabre Larry Playfair took over as team president, while former Buffalo Sabre Grant Ledyard took the position of head coach/general manager. Michael Peca was hired as general manager prior to the 2011-12 season.

In January 2012 Ledyard stepped down from his role as head coach. Russ Certo assumed the role of interim head coach for the remainder of the season, which included a first round playoff series victory over the Hamilton Red Wings before falling in the second round to the Oakville Blades. Peca officially added the role of head coach to his duties at the end of the 2011-12 season.

Under Peca's leadership, the Jr. Sabres finished the 2012-13 regular season as the OJHL's West Division champions and claimed the top seed in the South-West Conference for the 2013 playoffs. That regular season saw forward Tyler Gjurich score 53 goals and a total 97 points in 53 games, leading the entire league in points. Goaltender Parker Gahagen registered seven shutouts among his 29 wins. It was the first time since the 1993-94 season that the Jr. Sabres claimed first place in its division, while Gjurich became only the second player in franchise history to score 50 or more goals (the first was Brian Gionta during the 1996-97 season during the Niagara Scenic era). The 2012-13 roster also produced seven NCAA hockey-bound prospects as of March 1, 2013: Gjurich (Maine), Gahagen (Army), Josh Kielich (Canisius College), Darrin Trebes (Fredonia State), Derek Patterson (Plattsburgh State), Nathan Pelligra (Manhattanville College) and Nolan Sheeran (Canisius College, beginning 2014-15).

On October 22, 2013, it was announced the Jr. Sabres Junior A team would be joined by six younger-level teams, also carrying the Jr. Sabres name, in an expanded program that would play at the LECOM Harborcenter, the multi-use facility being constructed by the Buffalo Sabres which opened in 2014. The team previously played at the Northtown Center.

== Season-by-season results ==
1983 - 2005 - History -
Season	GP	W	L	T	OTL	GF	GA	P	Results	Playoffs
1983–84	50	29	13	8	-	--	--	66	1st NAHL	
1984–85	24	6	12	6	-	101	117	18	3rd NAHL	
1985–86	40	29	9	2	-	205	125	60	1st GHJHL	Did Not Participate
1985–86	24	6	14	4	-	110	238	16	4th NAHL	Split Season in NAHL
1986–87	Did Not Participate									
1987–88	32	16	12	4	-	159	139	36	3rd NAHL	
1988–89	40	21	13	6	-	220	206	48	3rd NAHL	USA Hockey National Runner-Up
1989–90	44	20	17	7	-	192	215	47	4th NAHL	
1990–91	40	12	21	7	-	--	--	31	6th NAHL	
1991–92	40	15	22	3	1	144	190	34	5th NAHL	
1992–93	40	14	18	8	6	158	197	36	4th NAHL	
1993–94	44	27	11	6	2	217	167	60	1st NAHL	
1994–95	EJHL Standings Not Available									
1995–96	52	32	15	5	-	294	242	69	4th Metro A	Won Quarters 4-3 (Tigers); Lost Semis 4-0 (Canadians)
1996–97	50	17	26	7	-	230	262	41	9th Metro A	Lost Prelim. 4-0 (Raiders)
1997–98	50	12	36	2	-	115	257	26	15th Metro A	DNQ
1998–99	51	11	34	4	2	148	249	28	10th OPJHL-W	DNQ
1999–00	49	13	32	2	2	170	236	30	9th OPJHL-W	DNQ
2000–01	49	25	16	7	1	203	176	58	5th OPJHL-W	Lost Div. Quarters 4-2 (Chargers)
2001–02	49	5	39	4	1	123	275	15	10th OPJHL-W	DNQ
2002–03	49	12	32	1	4	167	229	29	7th OPJHL-W	Won Div. Quarters 4-2 (Kiltys); Lost Div. Semis 4-0 (Merchants)
2003–04	49	12	31	4	2	137	239	30	9th OPJHL-W	Lost Div. Quarters 4-0 (Buzzers)
2004–05	49	18	27	3	1	163	232	40	7th OPJHL-W	Lost Div. Quarters 4-0 (Blades)

2018 - current
Buffalo Jr. Sabres
2005–06	49	4	41	4	0	85	292	12	10th OPJHL-W	DNQ
2006–07	49	9	35	5	0	154	298	23	9th OPJHL-W	Lost Div. Quarters 4-0 (Tigers)
2007–08	49	15	30	-	4	151	223	34	8th OPJHL-W	DNQ
2008–09	49	25	17	-	7	207	176	57	5th OJHL-M	Lost Div. Quarters 3-2 (Vipers)
2009–10	56	25	26	-	4	198	218	54	10th OJAHL	DNQ
2010–11	50	18	30	-	2	206	234	38	6th OJHL-W	DNQ
2011–12	49	23	21	-	5	189	189	51	3rd OJHL-W	Won Conf. Quarters 3-0 (Red Wings); Lost Conf. Semis 4-1 (Blades)
2012–13	55	38	12	-	5	249	160	81	1st OJHL-W	Won Conf. Quarters 4-0 (Cougars); Lost Conf. Semis 4-2 (Rangers)
2013–14	53	31	16	-	6	253	184	68	1st OJHL-W	Won Conf. Quarters 4-2 (Chargers); Lost Conf. Semis 4-1 (Raiders)
2014–15	54	22	19	1	2	172	208	47	3rd of 6, West Div. 8th of 12, South West Conf. 17th of 22, OJHL	Lost Conf. Quarters 3-4 (Raiders)
2015–16	54	33	17	1	3	233	166	70	3rd of 5, West Div. 4th of 11 South West Conf. 6th of 22, OJHL	Lost Conf. Quarters 1-4 (Rangers)
2016–17	54	23	27	2	2	177	189	50	3rd of 5, West Div. 8th of 11 South West Conf. 15th of 22, OJHL	Lost Conf. Quarters 1-4 (Raiders)
2017–18	54	26	22	0	6	173	172	58	2nd of 5, West Div. 6th of 11 South West Conf. 12th of 22, OJHL	Lost Conf. Quarters 0-4 (Rangers)
2018-19	55	27	17	3	8	192	184	65	2nd of 6, West Div. 3rd of 11 South West Conf. 8th of 22, OJHL	Won Conf. Quarters 4-3 (Cougars); Lost Conf. Semis 4-1 (Blades)
2019-20	54	31	17	1	5	201	178	68	3rd of 6, West Div. 4th of 11 South West Conf. 8th of 22, OJHL	Won Conf. Quarters 4-2 (Cougars); Remainder of Playoffs cancelled due to COVID-19
2020-21	Non-participant due to complications from Covid-19 pandemic									
2021-22										
2022-23										
2023-24	56	31	20	0	5	207	178	67	5th of 12 West Conf. 11th of 24, OJHL	Lost Conf. Quarters 2-4 (Blades)
2024-25	56	34	19	2	1	201	160	71	4th of 12 West Conf. 7th of 24, OJHL	Won Conf. Quarters 4-2 (Patriots); Lost Conf Semifinals 0-4 (Flyers)

== Notable alumni ==
- Brian Gionta
- Todd Marchant
- Aaron Miller
- Ryan Callahan
- Morris Titanic – former head coach
- Frank Downing Jr. – former Michigan captain
- Lee Stempniak
- Kevyn Adams
- Ken Baker - Entertainment Journalist
