= 2008–09 NAHL season =

- League: North American Hockey League
- Sport: Ice hockey
- Duration: Regular season September 17, 2008 – March 29, 2009; Postseason; April 3 – May 3, 2009
- Games: 58
- Teams: 19

Regular season
- Season champions: St. Louis Bandits
- Season MVP: Keith Kinkaid (St. Louis Bandits)
- Top scorer: Austin Block (Fairbanks Ice Dogs)

Robertson Cup Playoffs
- Finals champions: St. Louis Bandits
- Runners-up: Wenatchee Wild

NAHL seasons
- ← 2007–08 2009–10 →

The 2008–09 NAHL season was the 25th season of the North American Hockey League. The regular season ran from September 2008 to March 2009 with a 58-game schedule for each team. The St. Louis Bandits won the regular season championship and went on to defeated the Wenatchee Wild 3 to 2 in overtime to capture the Robertson Cup.

== Member changes ==
- In February, 2008 the NAHL approved Wenatchee, Washington for an expansion franchise. By May, the team's name was revealed as the Wenatchee Wild.
- On March 24, 2008 the NAHL approved the relocation of the Southern Minnesota Express to Detroit. The team would rebrand as the Motor City Machine. Less than two months later, the league approved of an expansion team in the Machine's former home of Owatonna, Minnesota. The new team would be called the Owatonna Express.
- Due to renovations at their home arena, the Texas Tornado sat out this season.
- After the USHL announced the addition of a new franchise in Fargo, North Dakota, the NAHL attempted to find a new home for the Fargo-Moorhead Jets. When nothing materialized, the franchise suspended operating on May 19, 2008.
- In June, the NAHL approved the addition of the Albert Lea Thunder as an expansion team.

== Regular season ==
The standings at the end of the regular season were as follows:

Note: x = clinched playoff berth; y = clinched division title; z = clinched regular season title

=== Standings ===
==== Central Division ====
Team	GP	W	L	OTL	Pts	GF	GA
xy – Bismarck Bobcats	58	43	13	2	88	202	121
x – North Iowa Outlaws	58	35	18	5	75	229	171
x – Owatonna Express	58	29	24	5	63	214	189
x – Alexandria Blizzard	58	26	26	6	58	180	201
Albert Lea Thunder	58	4	49	5	13	112	309

==== North Division ====
Team	GP	W	L	OTL	Pts	GF	GA
xy – Team USA	58	37	16	5	79	230	154
x – Mahoning Valley Phantoms	58	36	17	5	77	224	173
x – Traverse City North Stars	58	34	17	7	75	182	171
x – Alpena IceDiggers	58	27	25	6	60	157	184
Marquette Rangers	58	26	24	8	60	165	170
Motor City Machine	58	11	45	2	24	134	254

==== South Division ====
Team	GP	W	L	OTL	Pts	GF	GA
xyz – St. Louis Bandits	58	42	9	7	91	213	119
x – Topeka RoadRunners	58	42	11	5	89	204	138
x – Wichita Falls Wildcats	58	24	25	9	57	163	203
x – Springfield Jr. Blues	58	25	28	5	55	183	185

==== West Division ====
Team	GP	W	L	OTL	Pts	GF	GA
xy – Fairbanks Ice Dogs	58	39	12	8	86	226	152
x – Wenatchee Wild	58	35	19	4	74	197	182
x – Alaska Avalanche	58	23	30	5	51	172	224
x – Kenai River Brown Bears	58	14	37	8	36	167	254

=== Statistics ===
==== Scoring leaders ====
The following players led the league in regular season points at the completion of all regular season games.

Player	Team	GP	G	A	Pts	PIM
Austin Block	Fairbanks Ice Dogs	57	29	44	73	96
Jon Gaffney	Springfield Jr. Blues	56	33	34	67	147
Jordan George	Topeka RoadRunners	58	27	40	67	173
Jack Paul	North Iowa Outlaws	56	26	39	65	10
Brandon Brodhag	North Iowa Outlaws	56	33	32	65	46
Chad Pietila	Marquette Rangers	57	25	36	61	81
Andrew Hamburg	St. Louis Bandits	50	12	48	60	61
Michael Juola	Fairbanks Ice Dogs	51	16	43	59	75
Jerry Freismuth	Alexandria Blizzard	56	15	42	57	87
Alex Carlson	North Iowa Outlaws	52	24	33	57	71
Kyle Bonis	Traverse City North Stars	57	30	27	57	60

==== Leading goaltenders ====
Note: GP = Games played; Mins = Minutes played; W = Wins; L = Losses; OTL = Overtime losses; SOL = Shootout losses; SO = Shutouts; GAA = Goals against average; SV% = Save percentage

Player	Team	GP	Mins	W	L	OTL	SOL	GA	SO	SV%	GAA
Keith Kinkaid	St. Louis Bandits	40	2392:52	30	5	3	1	71	7	.935	1.78
David Bosner	Bismarck Bobcats	33	1970:48	24	7	0	1	60	6	.930	1.83
Bryce Merriam	Topeka RoadRunners	32	1799:08	22	4	1	3	60	3	.910	2.00
Joseph Phillippi	Fairbanks Ice Dogs	25	1227:56	14	2	1	2	41	3	.931	2.00
Matt Grogan	Bismarck Bobcats	27	1549:27	19	6	1	0	56	3	.924	2.17

== Robertson Cup playoffs ==
Five teams qualified for the Round Robin semifinal, the host (North Iowa) and the four division champions. If North Iowa won the Central division final, the runner-up would receive the final qualifying spot. For the round robin semifinal, ties were broken first by head-to-head matchup and then by goal differential.

Division Semifinals (Best-of-5)
C1	Bismarck Bobcats	3	0	3	4	-
C4	Alexandria Blizzard	1	3	2	1	-
Central Division
C2	North Iowa Outlaws	6	1	2*	1	-
C3	Owatonna Express	7**	4	1	2	-
N1	Team USA	5	2	4	4	-
N4	Alpena IceDiggers	3	5	1	1	-
North Division
N2	Mahoning Valley Phantoms	5	3	3	2	2
N3	Traverse City North Stars	4	4*	0	4	1
S1	St. Louis Bandits	3	1	2	3	-
S4	Springfield Jr. Blues	1	4	0	0	-
South Division
S2	Topeka RoadRunners	3	6	1	1	4
S3	Wichita Falls Wildcats	2	3	2*	4	2
W1	Fairbanks Ice Dogs	4	7	5	-	-
W4	Kenai River Brown Bears	1	1	2	-	-
West Division
W2	Wenatchee Wild	3	8	4	6	-
W3	Alaska Avalanche	4*	2	2	3	-

Division Finals (Best-of-5)
C1	Bismarck Bobcats	4	1	3*	1	6
C3	Owatonna Express	1	3	2	2	3
N1	Team USA	1	6	0	3	1
N2	Mahoning Valley Phantoms	4	4	4	1	2
S1	St. Louis Bandits	3	3	0	2	-
S2	Topeka RoadRunners	1	1	1**	1	-
W1	Fairbanks Ice Dogs	4	3	5	2	-
W2	Wenatchee Wild	6	4	3	3*	-

Semifinal (Round Robin)
C1	Bismarck Bobcats	-	2	2	2	3**
N2	Mahoning Valley Phantoms	4	-	2	4	2
S1	St. Louis Bandits	5	5	-	6	2
W2	Wenatchee Wild	3	5*	0	-	4
C2	North Iowa Outlaws	2	1	4	3	-

Championship (Best-of-1)
S1	St. Louis Bandits	3*
W2	Wenatchee Wild	2

Note: * denotes overtime period(s)

== Division Semifinals ==
=== Central Division ===
==== (C1) Bismarck Bobcats vs. (C4) Alexandria Blizzard ====
April 3	Bismarck Bobcats	3 – 1	Alexandria Blizzard	V.F.W. Sports Center
7:03 - John Wickman (1)		First period	No scoring
19:05 - pp - Cody Keefer (1)		Second period	No scoring
16:00 - Jeffrey Harris (1)		Third period	Garrett Grimstad (1) - pp - 1:03
David Bosner (20 saves / 21 shots)		Goalie stats	Ryan Leets (30 saves / 33 shots)

April 4	Bismarck Bobcats	0 – 3	Alexandria Blizzard	V.F.W. Sports Center
No scoring		First period	No scoring
No scoring		Second period	Joe Knoepke (1) - 13:41
No scoring		Third period	Taylor Vichorek (1) - pp - 11:03; Kyle Politz (1) - en - 19:48
David Bosner (24 saves / 26 shots)		Goalie stats	Ryan Leets (33 saves / 33 shots)

April 10	Alexandria Blizzard	2 – 3	Bismarck Bobcats	Runestone Community Center
7:47 - Taylor Vichorek (2)		First period	Jason Fabian (1) - 10:17; Jordan Singer (1) - 17:24
No scoring		Second period	Isaiah Bennis (1) - sh - 13:30
9:22 - Garrett Grimstad (2)		Third period	No scoring
Ryan Leets (17 saves / 20 shots)		Goalie stats	David Bosner (21 saves / 23 shots)

April 11	Alexandria Blizzard	1 – 4	Bismarck Bobcats	Runestone Community Center
17:50 - Kyle Politz (2)		First period	Isaiah Bennis (2) - 8:37; Jordan Singer (2) - pp - 15:09
No scoring		Second period	Tim Serratore (1) - 2:50; Jeffrey Harris (2) - pp - 11:47
No scoring		Third period	No scoring
Matt Hemingway (23 saves / 27 shots); Ryan Leets (11 saves / 11 shots)		Goalie stats	Matt Grogan (24 saves / 25 shots)

Bismarck wins series 3 – 1

==== (C2) North Iowa Outlaws vs. (C3) Owatonna Express ====
April 3	North Iowa Outlaws	6 – 7	2OT	Owatonna Express	North Iowa Ice Arena
3:58 - Jack Paul (1)		First period		David Kurbatsky (1) - 1:44; Brian McGinty (1) - 4:44; Cory Thorson (1) - 10:52
0:58 - pp - Alex Carlson (1); 12:01 - Ryan Bohrer (1); 13:32 - Bryce Wilcox (1)		Second period		Zach Vierling (1) - pp - 2:01; Chris Darnell (1) - 16:25; Dan Cecka (1) - pp - 18:58
2:15 - Brandon Brodhag (1); 15:59 - Kurt Weston (1)		Third period		No scoring
No scoring		Second overtime period		Chris Darnell (2) - pp - 1:43
Thomas Callaghan (15 saves / 21 shots); Keegan Asmundson (13 saves / 14 shots)		Goalie stats		Fredrik Bergman (44 saves / 50 shots)

April 4	North Iowa Outlaws	1 – 4	Owatonna Express	North Iowa Ice Arena
No scoring		First period	No scoring
No scoring		Second period	Dylan Porter (1) - 5:36; Chris Darnell (3) - pp - 12:25
15:47 - Travis Baker (1)		Third period	John Kruse (1) - pp - 18:16; Stephen Carew (1) - sh - en - 18:50
Keegan Asmundson (27 saves / 30 shots)		Goalie stats	Fredrik Bergman (38 saves / 39 shots)

April 7	Owatonna Express	1 – 2	OT	North Iowa Outlaws	Four Seasons Centre
No scoring		First period		No scoring
No scoring		Second period		No scoring
14:45 - pp - John Kruse (2)		Third period		Alex Carlson (2) - 5:43
No scoring		First overtime period		Jon Crouse (1) - 1:39
Fredrik Bergman (37 saves / 39 shots)		Goalie stats		Keegan Asmundson (16 saves / 17 shots)

April 11	Owatonna Express	2 – 1	North Iowa Outlaws	Four Seasons Centre
12:20 - Cory Thorson (2)		First period	No scoring
7:30 - Michael Palmiscno (1)		Second period	Brandon Brodhag (2) - 3:12
No scoring		Third period	No scoring
Fredrik Bergman (36 saves / 37 shots)		Goalie stats	Keegan Asmundson (30 saves / 32 shots)

Owatonna wins series 3 – 1

=== North Division ===
==== (N1) Team USA vs. (N4) Alpena IceDiggers ====
April 3	Team USA	5 – 3	Alpena IceDiggers	Ann Arbor Ice Cube
No scoring		First period	No scoring
3:44 - sh - Emerson Etem (1); 10:07 - pp - Emerson Etem (2)		Second period	Richard Manley (1) - pp - 1:44; J.C. Gulch (1) - pp - 2:17; Jimmy McCusker (1) - 15:09
4:36 - Michael Mersch (1); 13:54 - Kevin Clare (1); 19:33 - en - Frankie Simonelli (1)		Third period	No scoring
Brandon Maxwell (31 saves / 34 shots)		Goalie stats	Nick Graves (33 saves / 37 shots)

April 4	Team USA	2 – 5	Alpena IceDiggers	Ann Arbor Ice Cube
17:56 - pp - Nick Shore (1)		First period	No scoring
2:53 - Shane Sooth (1)		Second period	Jordan Miller (1) - pp - 1:53; Jimmy McCusker (1) - pp - 13:41; Ryan Timar (1) - pp - 18:50
No scoring		Third period	Andy Yarber (1) - 10:10; Erik Peterson (1) - pp - 19:15
Brandon Maxwell (28 saves / 33 shots)		Goalie stats	Nick Graves (28 saves / 30 shots)

April 10	Alpena IceDiggers	1 – 4	Team USA	Northern Lights Arena
No scoring		First period	No scoring
8:36 - Andy Yarber (1)		Second period	Austin Czarnik (1) - 4:34
No scoring		Third period	Justin Faulk (1) - 6:34; Nick Shore (2) - 7:39; Emerson Etem (3) - en - 19:33
Nick Graves (30 saves / 33 shots)		Goalie stats	Brandon Maxwell (26 saves / 27 shots)

April 11	Alpena IceDiggers	1 – 4	Team USA	Northern Lights Arena
5:48 - sh - John Fritsche Jr. (1)		First period	No scoring
		Second period	Michael Mersch (2) - pp - 5:57
No scoring		Third period	Michael Mersch (3) - 4:59; Jacob Fallon (1) - 10:25; Shane Sooth (2) - 10:45
Nick Graves (26 saves / 30 shots)		Goalie stats	Brandon Maxwell (20 saves / 21 shots)

USA wins series 3 – 1

==== (N2) Mahoning Valley Phantoms vs. (N3) Traverse City North Stars ====
April 3	Mahoning Valley Phantoms	5 – 4	Traverse City North Stars	Boardman Ice Zone
19:58 - pp - David Chaney (1)		First period	Kyle Bonis (1) - 6:02
13:02 - pp - Nick Kenney (1); 15:06 - pp - Jordy Trottier (1)		Second period	Kyle Bonis (2) - 16:39
5:07 - Erik Higby (1); 10:54 - pp - Cullen Lundholm (1)		Third period	Mike Schenfeld (1) - 7:40; Eric McLintock (1) - pp - 15:40
Jordan Tibbett (31 saves / 35 shots)		Goalie stats	C.J. Motte (16 saves / 21 shots)

April 5	Mahoning Valley Phantoms	3 – 4	OT	Traverse City North Stars	Boardman Ice Zone
No scoring		First period		Nathan Urbaniak (1) - 1:12; Jarrod LaBelle (1) - sh - 13:55
13:00 - Johnny Meo (1)		Second period		Marc Thompson (1) - 8:45
0:23 - pp - Cole Schneider (1); 2:50 - Alex Lippincott (1)		Third period		No scoring
No scoring		First overtime period		Nathan Urbaniak (2) - 0:18
Jordan Tibbett (18 saves / 21 shots)		Goalie stats		C.J. Motte (25 saves / 28 shots)

April 9	Traverse City North Stars	0 – 3	Mahoning Valley Phantoms	Molon Rink
No scoring		First period	Nick Shkreli (1) - pp - 10:43; Johnny Meo (2) - 14:33
No scoring		Second period	Erik Higby (2) - 14:30
No scoring		Third period	No scoring
C.J. Motte (27 saves / 30 shots)		Goalie stats	Garrett Bartus (28 saves / 28 shots)

April 10	Traverse City North Stars	4 – 2	Mahoning Valley Phantoms	Molon Rink
4:56 - Eric McLintock (2)		First period	Nick Kenney (2) - 7:04
2:23 - sh - Jarrod LaBelle (2); 16:43 - pp - Kyle Jean (1)		Second period	Stefan Salituro (1) - pp - 4:21
0:07 - Kyle Bonis (3)		Third period	No scoring
C.J. Motte (14 saves / 16 shots)		Goalie stats	Garrett Bartus (22 saves / 26 shots)

April 12	Mahoning Valley Phantoms	2 – 1	Traverse City North Stars	Boardman Ice Zone
No scoring		First period	No scoring
8:47 - Michael Pateras (1); 15:36 - Robert Harrison (1)		Second period	No scoring
No scoring		Third period	Eric O'Hearn (1) - 18:00
Jordan Tibbett (23 saves / 24 shots)		Goalie stats	C.J. Motte (24 saves / 26 shots)

Mahoning Valley wins series 3 – 2

=== South Division ===
==== (S1) St. Louis Bandits vs. (S4) Springfield Jr. Blues ====
April 3	St. Louis Bandits	3 – 1	Springfield Jr. Blues	Hardee's Iceplex
No scoring		First period	No scoring
2:56 - Daniel Olszewski (1)		Second period	No scoring
4:31 - pp - Soren Jonzzon (1); 19:14 - en - Daniel Olszewski (2)		Third period	Jon Gaffney (1) - pp - 14:28
Keith Kinkaid (25 saves / 26 shots)		Goalie stats	C.J. Groh (44 saves / 46 shots)

April 4	Springfield Jr. Blues	4 – 1	St. Louis Bandits	Nelson Center
Kyle Verbeek (1) - 0:51; Trent Frey (1) - 3:05		First period	No scoring
Jon Gaffney (2) - 3:28		Second period	No scoring
Nick Curry (1) - 3:16		Third period	10:17 - Andrew Hamburg (1)
C.J. Groh (35 saves / 36 shots)		Goalie stats	Keith Kinkaid (7 saves / 10 shots); Erick Cinotti (6 saves / 7 shots)

April 5	St. Louis Bandits	2 – 0	Springfield Jr. Blues	Hardee's Iceplex
No scoring		First period	No scoring
Andrew Hamburg (2) - 4:05		Second period	No scoring
Kyle Greco (1) - pp - 14:40		Third period	No scoring
Keith Kinkaid (16 saves / 16 shots)		Goalie stats	C.J. Groh (29 saves / 31 shots)

April 10	Springfield Jr. Blues	0 – 3	St. Louis Bandits	Nelson Center
No scoring		First period	Soren Jonzzon (2) - 2:03; Soren Jonzzon (3) - pp - 17:49
No scoring		Second period	Anthany Schooley (1) - 12:28
No scoring		Third period	No scoring
C.J. Groh (35 saves / 38 shots)		Goalie stats	Keith Kinkaid (22 saves / 22 shots)

St. Louis wins series 3 – 1

==== (S2) Topeka RoadRunners vs. (S3) Wichita Falls Wildcats ====
April 3	Topeka RoadRunners	3 – 2	Wichita Falls Wildcats	Kansas Expocentre
1:09 - Jordan George (1); 9:07 - pp - Andy Inderieden (1)		First period	No scoring
12:14 - pp - Jordan George (2)		Second period	Aaron Quick (1) - 18:21
No scoring		Third period	Ryan Amin (1) - 19:00
Bryce Merriam (12 saves / 14 shots)		Goalie stats	Phillip Graveline (18 saves / 21 shots)

April 5	Topeka RoadRunners	6 – 3	Wichita Falls Wildcats	Kansas Expocentre
10:00 - Matt Hartmann (1); 13:29 - Andrew Blazek (1)		First period	Sean McKenzie (1) - pp - 17:49; Chad Hudson (1) - sh - 19:30
3:45 - pp - Andy Inderieden (2); 5:36 - Travis Stevens (1)		Second period	No scoring
14:37 - sh - Steve Shafer (1); 19:18 - pp - Andrew Blazek (2)		Third period	Brett Hartung (1) - 12:30
Bryce Merriam (29 saves / 32 shots)		Goalie stats	Nick Hopper (31 saves / 37 shots)

April 10	Wichita Falls Wildcats	2 – 1	OT	Topeka RoadRunners	Kay Yeager Coliseum
No scoring		First period		No scoring
No scoring		Second period		Andy Inderieden (3) - 1:00
18:12 - Chad Hudson (2)		Third period		No scoring
3:03 - Brett Kaneshiro (1)		First overtime period		No scoring
Phillip Graveline (31 saves / 32 shots)		Goalie stats		Bryce Merriam (23 saves / 25 shots)

April 11	Wichita Falls Wildcats	4 – 1	Topeka RoadRunners	Kay Yeager Coliseum
No scoring		First period	Travis Stevens (2) - 8:00
19:38 - pp - Sean McKenzie (2)		Second period	No scoring
0:49 - sh - Brett Hartung (2); 12:08 - Sean McKenzie (3); 18:52 - en - Chad Hudson (3)		Third period	No scoring
Phillip Graveline (30 saves / 31 shots)		Goalie stats	Bryce Merriam (10 saves / 13 shots)

April 12	Topeka RoadRunners	4 – 2	Wichita Falls Wildcats	Kansas Expocentre
No scoring		First period	Sean McKenzie (4) - 6:29; Adam Kuhn (1) - 11:41
No scoring		Second period	No scoring
8:51 - pp - Bob Marx (1); 12:39 - Andy Inderieden (4); 16:22 - Matt Hartmann (2); 19:42 - pp - en - Jordan George (3)		Third period	No scoring
Bryce Merriam (16 saves / 18 shots)		Goalie stats	Phillip Graveline (46 saves / 49 shots)

Topeka wins series 3 – 2

=== West Division ===
==== (W1) Fairbanks Ice Dogs vs. (W4) Kenai River Brown Bears ====
April 3	Fairbanks Ice Dogs	4 – 1	Kenai River Brown Bears	Big Dipper Ice Arena
No scoring		First period	No scoring
No scoring		Second period	No scoring
4:57 - Jon Schreiner (1); 7:48 - Mark Pustin (1); 12:27 - Paul Kirtland (1); 14:25 - sh - James Saintey (1)		Third period	Ryan Lemke (1) - pp - 9:58
Joe Phillippi (28 saves / 29 shots)		Goalie stats	Jimmy Hamby (27 saves / 31 shots)

April 4	Fairbanks Ice Dogs	7 – 1	Kenai River Brown Bears	Big Dipper Ice Arena
16:34 - Michael Juola (1)		First period	Kevin Wentland (1) - 0:53
2:28 - Austin Block (1); 5:20 - pp - Andrew McCabe (1); 8:07 - Steve Zierke (1); 12:49 - pp - Andrew McCabe (2); 16:51 - Brandon Martell (1)		Second period	No scoring
6:36 - Michael Juola (2)		Third period	No scoring
Phil Cook (31 saves / 32 shots)		Goalie stats	Nick Dries (14 saves / 19 shots); Jimmy Hamby (7 saves / 9 shots)

April 10	Kenai River Brown Bears	2 – 5	Fairbanks Ice Dogs	Soldotna Sports Center
17:11 - Kevin Wentland (2)		First period	Austin Block (2) - 9:30; Joe Krause (1) - 18:16
No scoring		Second period	No scoring
10:21 - Ryan Goodmanson (1)		Third period	Austin Block (3) - 0:50; James Saintey (2) - 6:29; Austin Block (4) - 19:33
Jimmy Hamby (33 saves / 38 shots)		Goalie stats	Joe Phillippi (33 saves / 35 shots)

Fairbanks wins series 3 – 0

==== (W2) Wenatchee Wild vs. (W3) Alaska Avalanche ====
April 3	Wenatchee Wild	3 – 4	OT	Alaska Avalanche	Town Toyota Center
18:20 - Zach Ledford (1)		First period		Nardo Nagtzaam (1) - pp - 7:52
0:56 - Nic Dowd (1)		Second period		Sean McNeely (1) - pp - 8:52
16:39 - pp - Duncan McKellar (1)		Third period		Kyle Pichler (1) - 5:32
No scoring		First overtime period		Kyle Pichler (2) - 0:26
Mac Carruth (33 saves / 37 shots)		Goalie stats		Nathaniel Pellegrino (44 saves / 47 shots)

April 4	Wenatchee Wild	8 – 2	Alaska Avalanche	Town Toyota Center
9:46 - Nic Dowd (2); 17:15 - pp - Nic Dowd (3)		First period	Tyler Currier (1) - 4:17
10:28 - D.J. Vandercook (1); 12:12 - Duncan McKellar (2); 15:24 - pp - D.J. Vandercook (2)		Second period	Cory Belisle (1) - 18:18
10:21 - D.J. Vandercook (3); 10:58 - Jake Flynn (1); 19:30 - Michael Voran (1)		Third period	No scoring
Mathieu Dugas (27 saves / 29 shots)		Goalie stats	Nathaniel Pellegrino (32 saves / 40 shots)

April 10	Wenatchee Wild	4 – 2	Alaska Avalanche	Town Toyota Center
No scoring		First period	2:32 - sh - Kyle Pichler (2)
D.J. Vandercook (4) - 3:33; Nic Dowd (4) - 13:50		Second period	No scoring
Jack Nicoll (1) - 8:03; Corbin Brown (1) - 19:40		Third period	4:04 - Ryan Kowal (1)
Mathieu Dugas (21 saves / 23 shots)		Goalie stats	Nathaniel Pellegrino (34 saves / 38 shots)

April 11	Alaska Avalanche	3 – 6	Wenatchee Wild	Town Toyota Center
17:47 - Justin Giles (1)		First period	Mitch Torrel (1) - 4:24
4:00 - pp - Logan Rounds (1); 12:30 - pp - Tyler Currier (2)		Second period	Nick Nagel (1) - 6:39
No scoring		Third period	Nick Nagel (2) - 2:37; Jack Nicoll (2) - 6:31; Michael Voran (2) - pp - 17:43; Corbin Brown (2) - 19:53
Nathaniel Pellegrino (33 saves / 39 shots)		Goalie stats	Mathieu Dugas (28 saves / 31 shots)

Wenatchee wins series 3 – 1

== Division Finals ==
=== Central Division ===
==== (C1) Bismarck Bobcats vs. (C3) Owatonna Express ====
April 17	Bismarck Bobcats	4 – 1	Owatonna Express	V.F.W. Sports Center
7:15 - pp - Cody Keefer (2); 15:19 - Kevin Harris (1); 17:38 - Joel Lundstrom (1)		First period	No scoring
No scoring		Second period	John Kruse (3) - 4:24
19:59 - en - Casey Kleisinger (1)		Third period	No scoring
David Bosner (25 saves / 26 shots)		Goalie stats	Fredrik Bergman (23 saves / 26 shots)

April 18	Bismarck Bobcats	1 – 3	Owatonna Express	V.F.W. Sports Center
No scoring		First period	No scoring
19:25 - Cody Keefer (3)		Second period	Cory Thorson (3) - 4:58
No scoring		Third period	Stephen Carew (2) - 11:20; Dylan Porter (2) - en - 19:45
Matt Grogan (13 saves / 15 shots)		Goalie stats	Fredrik Bergman (22 saves / 23 shots)

April 24	Owatonna Express	2 – 3	OT	Bismarck Bobcats	Four Seasons Centre
15:50 - John Kruse (4); 17:02 - pp - Dan Cecka (2)		First period		Cody Keefer (4) - 7:11; Casey Kleisinger (2) - 11:39
No scoring		Second period		No scoring
No scoring		Third period		No scoring
No scoring		First overtime period		Myles Harvey (1) - 2:26
Fredrik Bergman (31 saves / 34 shots)		Goalie stats		David Bosner (21 saves / 23 shots)

April 25	Owatonna Express	2 – 1	Bismarck Bobcats	Four Seasons Centre
No scoring		First period	No scoring
13:25 - Chris Darnell (4)		Second period	Kevin Harris (2) - 2:28
3:18 - John Kruse (5)		Third period	No scoring
Fredrik Bergman (32 saves / 33 shots)		Goalie stats	David Bosner (25 saves / 27 shots)

April 26	Bismarck Bobcats	6 – 3	Owatonna Express	V.F.W. Sports Center
7:54 - Casey Kleisinger (3)		First period	No scoring
4:04 - pp - John Wickman (1); 4:28 - Nicholas Jensen (1)		Second period	Dylan Porter (3) - pp - 7:18; Michael Palmiscno (2) - 10:26; Cory Thorson (4) - 11:52
2:29 - Isaiah Bennis (3); 18:31 - Kevin Harris (3); 19:41 - en - Jordan Singer (3)		Third period	No scoring
David Bosner (21 saves / 24 shots)		Goalie stats	Fredrik Bergman (21 saves / 26 shots)

Bismarck wins series 3 – 2

=== North Division ===
==== (N1) Team USA vs. (N2) Mahoning Valley Phantoms ====
April 16	Team USA	1 – 4	Mahoning Valley Phantoms	Ann Arbor Ice Cube
No scoring		First period	Alex Lippincott (2) - pp - 17:04
11:39 - pp - Justin Faulk (2)		Second period	Cullen Lundholm (2) - 0:22; Josh Bussell (1) - 3:29
No scoring		Third period	Stefan Salituro (2) - en - 16:27
Brandon Maxwell (26 saves / 29 shots)		Goalie stats	Jordan Tibbett (47 saves / 48 shots)

April 17	Team USA	6 – 4	Mahoning Valley Phantoms	Ann Arbor Ice Cube
11:06 - Frankie Simonelli (2)		First period	Carl Nielsen (1) - 11:19
5:40 - Austin Czarnik (2); 10:09 - pp - Jarred Tinordi (1)		Second period	Johnny Meo (3) - pp - 1:17; Josh Bussell (1) - 6:22
3:03 - Justin Faulk (2); 5:39 - Jacob Fallon (2); 18:28 - en - Austin Czarnik (3)		Third period	Erik Higby (3) - pp - 15:19
Brandon Maxwell (33 saves / 37 shots)		Goalie stats	Jordan Tibbett (28 saves / 33 shots)

April 23	Mahoning Valley Phantoms	4 – 0	Team USA	Boardman Ice Zone
12:56 - Brandon Saad (1); 19:12 - George Saad (1)		First period	No scoring
No scoring		Second period	No scoring
Brandon Saad (2) - 2:44; Cole Schneider (2) - 8:27		Third period	No scoring
Jordan Tibbett (32 saves / 32 shots)		Goalie stats	Brandon Maxwell (31 saves / 35 shots)

April 24	Mahoning Valley Phantoms	1 – 3	Team USA	Boardman Ice Zone
16:21 - Stefan Salituro (3)		First period	Michael Mersch (4) - 12:44
No scoring		Second period	Michael Mersch (5) - 11:29
No scoring		Third period	Austin Czarnik (4) - 18:33
Jordan Tibbett (18 saves / 21 shots)		Goalie stats	Brandon Maxwell (27 saves / 28 shots)

April 25	Team USA	1 – 2	Mahoning Valley Phantoms	Ann Arbor Ice Cube
No scoring		First period	No scoring
No scoring		Second period	Erik Higby (4) - 12:49
19:25 - Emerson Etem (4)		Third period	Cole Schneider (3) - en - 18:09
Brandon Maxwell (27 saves / 28 shots)		Goalie stats	Jordan Tibbett (50 saves / 51 shots)

Mahoning Valley wins series 3 – 2

=== South Division ===
==== (S1) St. Louis Bandits vs. (S2) Topeka RoadRunners ====
April 17	St. Louis Bandits	3 – 1	Topeka RoadRunners	Hardee's Iceplex
11:52 - Conor Allen (1); 16:53 - pp - Clinton Bourbonais (1)		First period	No scoring
No scoring		Second period	No scoring
16:21 - pp - Justin Kirchhevel (1)		Third period	Randy Swank (1) - pp - 11:37
Keith Kinkaid (25 saves / 26 shots)		Goalie stats	Bryce Merriam (25 saves / 28 shots)

April 18	St. Louis Bandits	3 –1	Topeka RoadRunners	Hardee's Iceplex
No scoring		First period	No scoring
3:43 - Chris Ciotti (1); 6:12 - pp - Soren Jonzzon (4); 8:56 - Kyle Greco (2)		Second period	No scoring
No scoring		Third period	Bryon Paulazzo (1) - sh - 5:24
Keith Kinkaid (27 saves / 28 shots)		Goalie stats	Lyle Rocker (33 saves / 36 shots)

April 23	Topeka RoadRunners	1 – 0	2OT	St. Louis Bandits	Kansas Expocentre
No scoring		First period		No scoring
No scoring		Second period		No scoring
No scoring		Third period		No scoring
8:43 - Steve Shafer (2)		Second overtime period		No scoring
Bryce Merriam (33 saves / 33 shots)		Goalie stats		Keith Kinkaid (43 saves / 44 shots)

April 24	Topeka RoadRunners	1 – 2	St. Louis Bandits	Kansas Expocentre
No scoring		First period	No scoring
No scoring		Second period	Soren Jonzzon (5) - pp - 19:02; Dan Weiss (1) - 19:51
18:40 - Bryon Paulazzo (2)		Third period	No scoring
Bryce Merriam (19 saves / 21 shots)		Goalie stats	Keith Kinkaid (23 saves / 24 shots)

St. Louis wins series 3 – 1

=== West Division ===
==== (W1) Fairbanks Ice Dogs vs. (W2) Wenatchee Wild ====
April 17	Fairbanks Ice Dogs	4 – 6	Wenatchee Wild	Big Dipper Ice Arena
No scoring		First period	Michael Voran (3) - 0:32; Evan Mosey (1) - 12:52
No scoring		Second period	Michael Di Puma (1) - 9:16; Michael Voran (4) - pp - 19:16
3:24 - Kyle Lonetto (1); 11:05 - Eric Kraft (1)		Third period	Nic Dowd (5) - 10:01; Junior Cadiz (1) - sh - 13:57
Phil Cook (13 saves / 16 shots); Joe Phillippi (8 saves / 11 shots)		Goalie stats	Mathieu Dugas (32 saves / 36 shots)

April 18	Fairbanks Ice Dogs	3 –4	Wenatchee Wild	Big Dipper Ice Arena
No scoring		First period	Nic Dowd (6) - 8:09; Evan Mosey (2) - 18:38
16:32 - James Saintey (3)		Second period	No scoring
10:43 - pp - Andrew McCabe (3); 11:15 - Austin Block (5)		Third period	Cam Severson (1) - 8:24; Michael Voran (5) - pp - 15:52
Joe Phillippi (26 saves / 30 shots)		Goalie stats	Mathieu Dugas (30 saves / 33 shots)

April 23	Wenatchee Wild	3 – 5	Fairbanks Ice Dogs	Town Toyota Center
10:44 - Zach Ledford (1)		First period	Eric Kraft (2) - pp - 15:09; Matt Millis (1) - 15:51
18:20 - pp - D.J. Vandercook (5)		Second period	Austin Block (6) - 7:35
19:24 - Michael Voran (6)		Third period	Brad McCabe (1) - pp - 4:09; Kyle Lonetto (2) - en - 19:28
Mathieu Dugas (24 saves / 28 shots)		Goalie stats	Joe Phillippi (40 saves / 43 shots)

April 24	Wenatchee Wild	3 – 2	OT	Fairbanks Ice Dogs	Town Toyota Center
No scoring		First period		Austin Block (7) - 7:11; Matt Millis (2) - 13:51
18:15 - Nic Dowd (7)		Second period		No scoring
17:54 - Mitch Torrel (2)		Third period
4:44 - Nic Dowd (8)		First overtime period		No scoring
Mathieu Dugas (7 saves / 9 shots); Mac Carruth (23 saves / 23 shots)		Goalie stats		Joe Phillippi (41 saves / 44 shots)

Wenatchee wins series 3 – 1

== Semifinal ==
=== April 28 ===
Bismarck Bobcats	2 – 4	Mahoning Valley Phantoms	North Iowa Ice Arena
No scoring	First period	Brandon Saad (3) - pp - 15:03; Nick Kenney (3) - 15:34; Stefan Salituro (4) - 16:59
12:11 - pp - Derek Kimbro (2)	Second period	No scoring
6:03 - Isaiah Bennis (4)	Third period	Brandon Saad (4) - 4:09
David Bosner (6 saves / 8 shots); Matt Grogan (11 saves / 13 shots)	Goalie stats	Jordan Tibbett (25 saves / 27 shots)

Wenatchee Wild	4 – 3	North Iowa Outlaws	North Iowa Ice Arena
Cam Severson (2) - 7:29	First period	No scoring
Michael Voran (7) - 7:11; Michael Voran (8) - 16:13	Second period	1:38 - pp - Alex Carlson (3); 7:35 - Matt Leer (1)
D.J. Vandercook (6) - 0:22	Third period	2:42 - Ryan Bohrer (2)
Mac Carruth (30 saves / 33 shots)	Goalie stats	Keegan Asmundson (26 saves / 30 shots)

=== April 29 ===
St. Louis Bandits	6 – 0	Wenatchee Wild	North Iowa Ice Arena
11:43 - pp - Ryan Rashid (1)	First period	No scoring
2:39 - pp - Clinton Bourbonais (2); 14:06 - Dan Weiss (2); 17:17 - sh - Tyler Klein (1)	Second period	No scoring
1:16 - Clinton Bourbonais (3); 17:59 - Soren Jonzzon (4)	Third period	No scoring
Keith Kinkaid (24 saves / 24 shots)	Goalie stats	Mac Carruth (9 saves / 14 shots); Mathieu Dugas (7 saves / 8 shots)

North Iowa Outlaws	1 – 2	Mahoning Valley Phantoms	North Iowa Ice Arena
12:58 - Brandon Brodhag (3)	First period	Johnny Meo (3) - 15:03
No scoring	Second period	Erik Higby (5) - 12:15
No scoring	Third period	No scoring
Keegan Asmundson (25 saves / 27 shots)	Goalie stats	Jordan Tibbett (36 saves / 37 shots)

=== April 30 ===
Wenatchee Wild	5 – 4	OT	Mahoning Valley Phantoms	North Iowa Ice Arena
No scoring	First period		14:14 - Brandon Saad (4); 15:23 - Alex Lippincott (3)
Mitch Torrel (3) - 7:11; D.J. Vandercook (7) - 18:53	Second period		5:22 - George Saad (2); 7:37 - Michael Pateras (2)
D.J. Vandercook (8) - 0:33; Brandon Burrell (1) - pp - 4:39	Third period		No scoring
D.J. Vandercook (9) - 0:55	First overtime period		No scoring
Mac Carruth (0 saves / 3 shots); Mathieu Dugas (28 saves / 29 shots)	Goalie stats		Jordan Tibbett (33 saves / 38 shots)

St. Louis Bandits	5 – 2	Bismarck Bobcats	North Iowa Ice Arena
8:55 - Grant Gorczyca (1); 12:57 - Kyle Greco (3)	First period	No scoring
17:53 - Anthany Schooley (2)	Second period	Cody Keefer (5) - pp - 5:51; Isaiah Bennis (5) - 11:59
2:37 - pp - Kyle Greco (4); 17:21 - en - Daniel Olszewski (3)	Third period	No scoring
Keith Kinkaid (12 saves / 14 shots)	Goalie stats	David Bosner (21 saves / 25 shots)

=== May 1 ===
St. Louis Bandits	5 – 2	Mahoning Valley Phantoms	North Iowa Ice Arena
16:43 - pp - Kyle Greco (5); 17:12 - Ryan Rashid (2)	First period	No scoring
11:42 - Tyler Elbrecht (1); 12:22 - Ryan Rashid (3)	Second period	Mike Gunn (1) - pp - 16:20; Johnny Meo (4) - ps - 18:01
13:20 - Anthany Schooley (3)	Third period	No scoring
Keith Kinkaid (20 saves / 22 shots)	Goalie stats	Jordan Tibbett (16 saves / 20 shots); Garrett Bartus (13 saves / 14 shots)

Bismarck Bobcats	3 – 2	2OT	North Iowa Outlaws	North Iowa Ice Arena
4:23 - Derek Kimbro (2)	First period		No scoring
17:22 - pp - Casey Kleisinger (4)	Second period		Jack Paul (2) - 8:27
No scoring	Third period		Rob Johnson (1) - 2:53
5:09 - Jason Fabian (2)	Second overtime period		No scoring
Matt Grogan (46 saves / 48 shots)	Goalie stats		Thomas Callaghan (52 saves / 55 shots)

=== May 2 ===
Wenatchee Wild	3 – 2	Bismarck Bobcats	North Iowa Ice Arena
Michael Voran (9) - 5:12	First period	No scoring
No scoring	Second period	7:25 - Derek Kimbro (3); 10:55 - Jordan Singer (4)
D.J. Vandercook (10) - 3:30; Jack Nicoll (3) - 11:45	Third period	No scoring
Mathieu Dugas (25 saves / 27 shots)	Goalie stats	Matt Grogan (25 saves / 28 shots)

North Iowa Outlaws	4 – 2	St. Louis Bandits	North Iowa Ice Arena
Travis Peckskamp (1) - 12:36; Joe Harren (1) - 18:27	First period	14:07 - Blake Edwards (1)
Bryce Wilcox (2) - 9:09	Second period	2:50 - Justin Kirchhevel (2)
19:57 - en - Jack Paul (3)	Third period	No scoring
Thomas Callaghan (34 saves / 36 shots)	Goalie stats	Erick Cinotti (18 saves / 21 shots)

== Robertson Cup Final ==
=== (S1) St. Louis Bandits vs. (W2) Wenatchee Wild ===
St. Louis Bandits	3 – 2	OT	Wenatchee Wild	North Iowa Ice Arena
10:13 - Grant Gorczyca (2)	First period		Junior Cadiz (2) - pp - 19:27
3:37 - Grant Gorczyca (3)	Second period		No scoring
No scoring	Third period		Duncan McKellar (3) - pp - 6:52
16:17 - Clinton Bourbonais (4)	First overtime period		No scoring
Keith Kinkaid (29 saves / 31 shots)	Goalie stats		Mathieu Dugas (35 saves / 38 shots)
