= Nic Dowd =

American ice hockey player (born 1990)

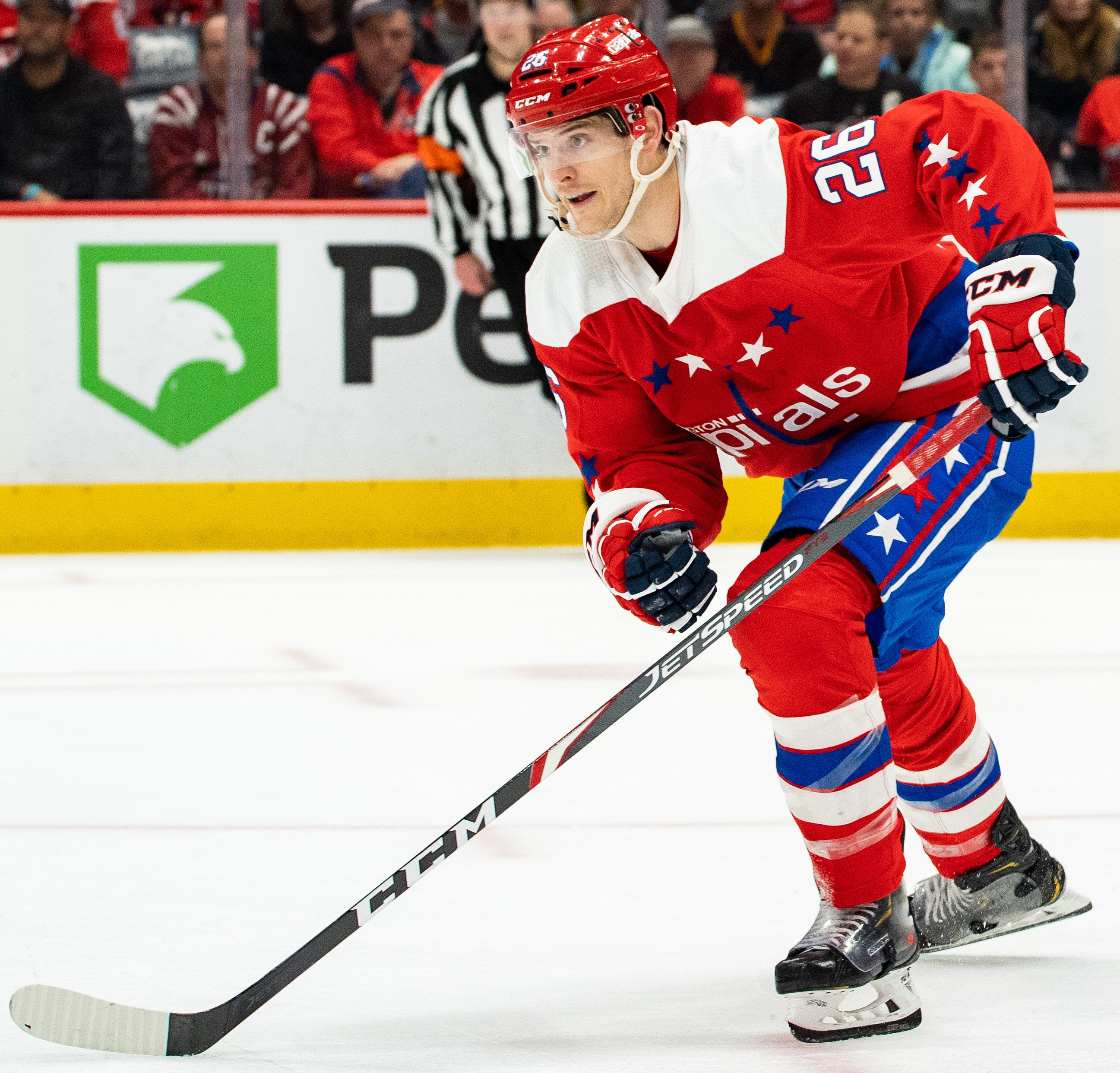
- Dowd with the Washington Capitals in 2020
- Born: May 27, 1990 (age 36) Huntsville, Alabama, U.S.
- Height: 6 ft 2 in (188 cm)
- Weight: 196 lb (89 kg; 14 st 0 lb)
- Position: Forward
- Shoots: Right
- NHL team Former teams: Vegas Golden Knights; Los Angeles Kings; Vancouver Canucks; Washington Capitals
- NHL draft: 198th overall, 2009; Los Angeles Kings
- Playing career: 2014–present

Nicholas Dowd (born May 27, 1990) is an American and professional ice hockey player who is a forward for the Vegas Golden Knights of the National Hockey League (NHL). He was selected by the Los Angeles Kings in the seventh round, 198th overall, of the 2009 NHL entry draft, and has also played for the Vancouver Canucks and Washington Capitals.

A native of Huntsville, Alabama, Dowd is the third NHL player (after Jared Ross and Aud Tuten) who is from the state of Alabama.

== Playing career ==
=== Amateur ===
Dowd grew up in Huntsville, Alabama where he played junior hockey. Dowd moved to Wenatchee, Washington to play for the Wenatchee Wild in the North American Hockey League (NAHL). The following season he played for the Indiana Ice in Indianapolis, Indiana, before joining the St. Cloud State Huskies in the NCAA Men's Division I National Collegiate Hockey Conference (NCHC). In his senior year, Dowd's outstanding play was rewarded with a selection to the inaugural 2013–14 All-NCHC First Team as well as being a finalist for the Hobey Baker Award. He finished his college career with 52 goals and 69 assists for 121 points in 155 games played.

=== Professional ===
==== Los Angeles Kings ====
On April 1, 2014, the Los Angeles Kings of the National Hockey League (NHL) signed Dowd to an entry-level contract, assigning him to their American Hockey League (AHL) affiliate, the Manchester Monarchs. During the 2015–16 season, he made his NHL debut on March 22, 2016, and played 5 games before returning to the Ontario Reign. He recorded his first career NHL goal the following season on October 20, 2016, against the Dallas Stars.

==== Vancouver Canucks ====
In the 2017–18 season, on December 7, 2017, the Los Angeles Kings traded Dowd to the Vancouver Canucks in exchange for Jordan Subban. He remained on the Canucks roster to play out the season, posting 3 goals in 40 games.

==== Washington Capitals ====
As a free agent from the Canucks, Dowd agreed to a one-year, $650,000 contract with the reigning Stanley Cup champions, the Washington Capitals, on July 1, 2018. On April 11, 2019, he signed a three-year contract extension with the Capitals.

Dowd played on the Capitals fourth line with Garnet Hathaway and Carl Hagelin throughout the 2020-21 NHL season.

On November 14, 2021, Dowd signed a three-year, $3.9 million contract extension with the Capitals. He later signed a two-year, $6 million contract extension with the Capitals on April 16, 2025.

==== Vegas Golden Knights ====
Midway through his eighth season with Washington, Dowd was traded to the Vegas Golden Knights on March 5, 2026, in exchange for Jesper Vikman, a second-round pick in 2029, and a third-round pick in 2027. Dowd debuted for Vegas two days later, playing just over 13 minutes in a 4–2 loss to the Minnesota Wild.

== Personal life ==
Dowd was born on May 27, 1990, in Huntsville, Alabama, U.S. to British-born parents Alan and Liz Dowd. He married his wife Paige Dowd (formerly Kraemer), whom he met while studying at St. Cloud State University, on August 11, 2017.

== Career statistics ==
			Regular season					Playoffs
Season	Team	League	GP	G	A	Pts	PIM	GP	G	A	Pts	PIM
2007–08	Culver Military Academy	USHS	45	15	31	46	38	—	—	—	—	—
2008–09	St. Louis Bandits	NAHL	3	0	0	0	2	—	—	—	—	—
2008–09	Wenatchee Wild	NAHL	43	16	33	49	71	13	8	14	22	34
2009–10	Indiana Ice	USHL	46	16	23	39	48	9	2	4	6	2
2010–11	St. Cloud State	WCHA	36	5	13	18	34	—	—	—	—	—
2011–12	St. Cloud State	WCHA	39	11	13	24	36	—	—	—	—	—
2012–13	St. Cloud State	WCHA	41	14	25	39	41	—	—	—	—	—
2013–14	St. Cloud State	NCHC	38	22	18	40	32	—	—	—	—	—
2013–14	Manchester Monarchs	AHL	7	0	3	3	0	4	1	0	1	0
2014–15	Manchester Monarchs	AHL	75	9	32	41	44	19	7	6	13	10
2015–16	Ontario Reign	AHL	58	14	34	48	49	13	4	7	11	14
2015–16	Los Angeles Kings	NHL	5	0	0	0	2	—	—	—	—	—
2016–17	Los Angeles Kings	NHL	70	6	16	22	25	—	—	—	—	—
2017–18	Los Angeles Kings	NHL	16	0	1	1	12	—	—	—	—	—
2017–18	Vancouver Canucks	NHL	40	3	0	3	16	—	—	—	—	—
2018–19	Washington Capitals	NHL	64	8	14	22	20	7	1	0	1	6
2019–20	Washington Capitals	NHL	56	7	8	15	28	8	0	0	0	4
2020–21	Washington Capitals	NHL	56	11	4	15	31	5	2	0	2	4
2021–22	Washington Capitals	NHL	64	10	14	24	44	6	1	1	2	4
2022–23	Washington Capitals	NHL	65	13	12	25	26	—	—	—	—	—
2023–24	Washington Capitals	NHL	64	12	10	22	47	4	0	0	0	6
2024–25	Washington Capitals	NHL	82	14	13	27	56	10	0	1	1	8
2025–26	Washington Capitals	NHL	55	4	12	16	53	—	—	—	—	—
2025–26	Vegas Golden Knights	NHL	20	1	4	5	20	22	3	1	4	8
NHL totals			657	89	108	197	380	62	7	3	10	40

Medal record

Ice hockey

Representing (United States) USA

World Junior A Challenge
Gold medal – first place	2009 Summerside	

== Awards and achievements ==
Award	Year	Ref
College
WCHA All-Academic Team	2011–12, 2012–13	
All-NCHC First Team	2013–14	
AHCA West First-Team All-American	2013–14	
Hobey Baker Award finalist	2013–14	
AHL
Calder Cup winner	2015	

Awards and achievements
Preceded by Award created	NCHC Defensive Forward of the Year; 2013–14	Succeeded by Mark MacMillan
Preceded by Award created	NCHC Scholar-Athlete of the Year; 2013–14	Succeeded by Nick Mattson
