= Youngstown Phantoms =

American junior ice hockey team

- City: Youngstown, Ohio
- League: United States Hockey League
- Conference: Eastern
- Founded: 2003 (in the NAHL)
- Home arena: Covelli Centre
- Colors: Purple, orange, black
- Owners: Bruce J. Zoldan, Alex Zoldan, Ron Zoldan, Black Bear Sports Group
- General manager: Jason Deskins and Ryan Kosecki
- Head coach: Ryan Ward
- Media: Western Reserve Radio (Internet); FloHockey

Franchise history
- 2003–2005: Youngstown Phantoms
- 2005–2009: Mahoning Valley Phantoms
- 2009–present: Youngstown Phantoms

Championships
- Regular season titles: 2 Anderson Cups (2014–15, 2025–26)
- Playoff championships: 1 Clark Cup (2023)

The Youngstown Phantoms are a junior ice hockey team that plays in the Eastern Conference of the United States Hockey League (USHL). The team plays home games at the 5,200-seat Covelli Centre in Youngstown, Ohio. The team was co-owned by Bruce J. Zoldan (founder and CEO of fireworks brand Phantom Fireworks, hence the team's name) and Troy Loney (who played 12 years in the NHL, primarily for the Pittsburgh Penguins) along with his wife Aafke Loney. In the summer of 2018, the Loneys sold their interests to the Black Bear Sports Group led by CEO Murry Gunty.

== History ==
From their inaugural season in 2003 until 2009, the Phantoms played in the North American Hockey League's North Division, with home games at the 1,000-seat Boardman Ice Zone in the suburb of Boardman, Ohio. From 2005 until 2009, the team was known as the Mahoning Valley Phantoms, because the Central Hockey League's Youngstown SteelHounds moved into the county. However, soon after the SteelHounds shut down, the Phantoms started playing most of their games in the city of Youngstown, and with the move to the USHL, re-adopted the old Youngstown Phantoms name.

Seventeen players with Youngstown Phantoms ties have been drafted into the NHL. Defenseman Scott Mayfield (2009–11) was drafted in the second round, 34th overall, by the New York Islanders in the 2011 NHL entry draft. Goalie Matthew Mahalak (2009–10) was drafted in the sixth round, 163rd overall, by the Carolina Hurricanes, also in 2011. Forward Nathan Walker (2012–13) was drafted in the third round, 89th overall, by the Washington Capitals in the 2014 NHL entry draft. Forward Maxim Letunov (2013–15) was drafted in the second round, 52nd overall, by the St. Louis Blues, also in 2014. Also, a total of seven alumni have signed NHL contracts, including Nathan Walker, Scott Mayfield, Brandon Saad, Jiri Sekac, Andrej Sustr and Lucas Craggs. In addition, Mayfield, Saad, Sustr and Sekac have seen action with their respective NHL clubs, and Saad won the Stanley Cup with the Chicago Blackhawks in 2013. On August 10, 2011, the Youngstown Phantoms announced 29-year-old Chicago native Anthony Noreen as head coach, making him the third head coach in the team's history. Before joining the Youngstown Phantoms, Noreen was an assistant coach for three seasons at his alma mater, University of Wisconsin – Stevens Point. In April 2012, Noreen's contract was extended through the 2013–14 season. Noreen was hired by the ECHL's Orlando Solar Bears after the 2014–15 season. John Wroblewski was then hired for the 2015–16 season as the fourth head coach in team history. After one season in Youngstown, Wroblewski was hired by the USA Hockey National Team Development Program as the head coach and was replaced by former assistant coach, Brad Patterson. Patterson's contract was not renewed at the end of the 2021–22 season and he was replaced by Ryan Ward. In February 2023, the Phantoms participated in their first outdoor game in franchise history, hosting the Cedar Rapids RoughRiders at FirstEnergy Stadium in Cleveland, Ohio.

== Regular season records ==
Season	League	GP	W	L	OTL	PTS	GF	GA	PIM	Finish
2003–04	NAHL	56	28	21	7	63	168	169	1347	5th, North
2004–05	NAHL	56	27	25	4	58	201	181	1365	4th, North
2005–06	NAHL	58	34	20	4	72	214	181	1288	3rd, North
2006–07	NAHL	62	47	14	1	95	283	168	1198	1st, North
2007–08	NAHL	58	36	18	4	76	227	173	1272	2nd, North
2008–09	NAHL	58	36	17	5	77	224	173	1092	2nd, North
2009–10	USHL	60	20	36	4	44	170	247	1607	7th, Eastern
2010–11	USHL	60	23	30	7	53	167	205	1145	7th, Eastern
2011–12	USHL	60	32	21	7	71	202	196	1190	4th, Eastern
2012–13	USHL	64	37	27	0	74	215	199	1348	3rd of 8, Eastern; 7th of 16, USHL
2013–14	USHL	60	17	37	6	40	172	230	1212	8th of 8, Eastern; 15th of 16, USHL
2014–15	USHL	60	40	14	6	86	233	166	1178	1st of 9, Eastern; 1st of 17, USHL
2015–16	USHL	60	31	20	9	71	192	177	1020	5th of 9, Eastern; 6th of 17, USHL
2016–17	USHL	60	34	20	6	74	161	135	1054	4th of 9, Eastern; 8th of 17, USHL
2017–18	USHL	60	33	20	7	73	180	189	976	2nd of 9, Eastern; 6th of 17, USHL
2018–19	USHL	62	36	21	5	77	214	209	1101	3rd of 9, Eastern; 6th of 17, USHL
2019–20	USHL	50	20	22	8	48	146	197	865	Season cancelled
2020–21	USHL	49	12	30	7	31	145	218	689	6th of 6, Eastern; 14th of 14, USHL
2021–22	USHL	62	29	23	10	68	191	199	775	4th of 8, Eastern; 7th of 16, USHL
2022–23	USHL	62	38	19	5	81	225	173	1052	2nd of 8, Eastern; 4th of 16, USHL
2023–24	USHL	62	33	19	10	76	230	206	1290	4th of 8, Eastern; 5th of 16, USHL
2024–25	USHL	62	42	18	2	86	232	167	1091	1st of 8, Eastern; 2nd of 16 USHL
2025–26	USHL	62	43	14	5	91	228	147	899	1st of 8, Eastern; 1st of 16, USHL

== Playoff records ==
Season	GP	W	L	OTL	GF	GA	PIM	Finish
2006	8	2	6	0	20	33	166	Lost in Quarterfinals
2007	10	9	1	0	47	24	152	Lost in Championship Game
2008	12	6	5	1	39	34	222	Lost in Round 2
2009	14	8	6	0	42	37	159	Lost in Semifinals
2012	6	3	3	0	20	25	100	Lost in East Conf. Semifinals
2013	9	5	4	0	23	23	121	Lost in East Conf. Finals
2015	4	1	3	0	11	13	95	Lost in East Conf. Semifinals
2017	5	2	3	0	8	15	79	Lost in East Conf. Semifinals
2018	11	7	4	0	39	35	164	Lost in Clark Cup Final
2019	2	0	2	0	3	6	24	Lost in First Round
2022	2	0	2	0	5	8	12	Lost in First Round
2023	9	8	1	0	25	13	100	Clark Cup Champions
2024	8	3	3	1	20	23	75	Lost in East Conf. Semifinals
2025	0	0	3	0	8	16	63	Lost in East Conf. Semifinals
