= Austin Block =

American ice hockey player

- Born: October 10, 1989 (age 36) Denver, Colorado, U.S.
- Height: 5 ft 11 in (180 cm)
- Weight: 185 lb (84 kg; 13 st 3 lb)
- Position: Center
- Shot: Right
- team: Free agent
- Played for: HIFK; Karlskrona HK; HC ’05 Banská Bystrica; Bakersfield Condors; Orlando Solar Bears; Cincinnati Cyclones; Worcester Railers; Manchester Monarchs
- NHL draft: Undrafted
- Playing career: 2013–2022

Austin Block (born October 10, 1989) is an American former professional ice hockey center. He is currently an unrestricted free agent, having last played for the Manchester Monarchs in the ECHL.

== Early and personal life ==
Block was born in Denver, Colorado, but grew up in Thousand Oaks, California, and is Jewish. His parents are Randy Block (who played football at Northern Arizona) and Shellie Jernigan.

== Playing career ==
Block played with the Fairbanks Ice Dogs of the North American Hockey League for two seasons, where he had 100 points (42 goals, 58 assists) in 110 games, as he led the league in points (76) in 2008–09, as he was named the league's top forward as NAHL Forward of the Year. He was also named to the NAHL All-West Division Team and NAHL First All-Star Team.

He then played for the University of New Hampshire Wildcats men's hockey program. He played four seasons at UNH, playing 136 games and putting up 25 goals and 25 assists for 50 points.

On July 22, 2013, HIFK of the Finnish Liiga announced they had signed Block after a two-week tryout in June 2013. Block made his Liiga debut playing with HIFK during the 2013–14 Liiga season. On September 20, 2013, Block was loaned from HIFK to Mestis club, HCK until he moved to Swedish HockeyAllsvenskan club Karlskrona HK.

In the following 2014–15 season, Block moved to the Slovak Extraliga with HC ’05 Banská Bystrica, appearing in 21 games for 15 points before returning to North American to play in the ECHL with the Bakersfield Condors.

On July 31, 2015, Block signed a one-year contract to remain in the ECHL with the Manchester Monarchs.

On February 12, 2016, the Orlando Solar Bears, ECHL affiliate of the NHL's Toronto Maple Leafs and AHL's Toronto Marlies, announced they had acquired Block from the Monarchs in exchange for future considerations. He spent parts of two seasons with the Solar Bears.

Block was traded to the Cincinnati Cyclones on October 2, 2017, just prior to the 2017–18 season. He made just two appearances with the Cyclones before suffering a season-ending injury.

As a free agent, Block continued his ECHL career by agreeing to contract with the Worcester Railers for the 2018–19 season on October 7, 2018. He contributed with 7 assists through 25 games with the Railers, before he was traded to former club the Manchester Monarchs on December 30, 2018.

== Career statistics ==
			Regular season					Playoffs
Season	Team	League	GP	G	A	Pts	PIM	GP	G	A	Pts	PIM
2007–08	Fairbanks Ice Dogs	NAHL	52	10	14	24	38	9	1	4	5	18
2008–09	Fairbanks Ice Dogs	NAHL	58	32	44	76	96	6	7	4	11	2
2009–10	University of New Hampshire	HE	25	1	2	3	12	—	—	—	—	—
2010–11	University of New Hampshire	HE	36	4	5	9	18	—	—	—	—	—
2011–12	University of New Hampshire	HE	36	5	10	15	20	—	—	—	—	—
2012–13	University of New Hampshire	HE	39	15	8	23	44	—	—	—	—	—
2013–14	HIFK	Liiga	21	0	3	3	8	—	—	—	—	—
2013–14	HCK	Mestis	3	2	2	4	0	—	—	—	—	—
2013–14	Karlskrona HK	Allsv	8	1	2	3	4	—	—	—	—	—
2014–15	HC ’05 Banská Bystrica	Slovak	21	6	9	15	8	—	—	—	—	—
2014–15	Bakersfield Condors	ECHL	14	2	6	8	4	—	—	—	—	—
2015–16	Manchester Monarchs	ECHL	40	3	9	12	27	—	—	—	—	—
2015–16	Orlando Solar Bears	ECHL	23	2	5	7	10	—	—	—	—	—
2016–17	Orlando Solar Bears	ECHL	51	12	23	35	34	—	—	—	—	—
2017–18	Cincinnati Cyclones	ECHL	2	0	0	0	4	—	—	—	—	—
2018–19	Worcester Railers	ECHL	25	0	7	7	14	—	—	—	—	—
Liiga totals			21	0	3	3	8	—	—	—	—	—

== Awards and honors ==
Award	Year
NAHL
All-West Division Team	2009
First All-Star Team	2009
Forward of the Year	2009
Most Points (76)	2009
College
Hockey East Regular Season Champions	2010

== See also ==
- List of select Jewish ice hockey players
