= Justin Faulk =

American ice hockey player (born 1992)

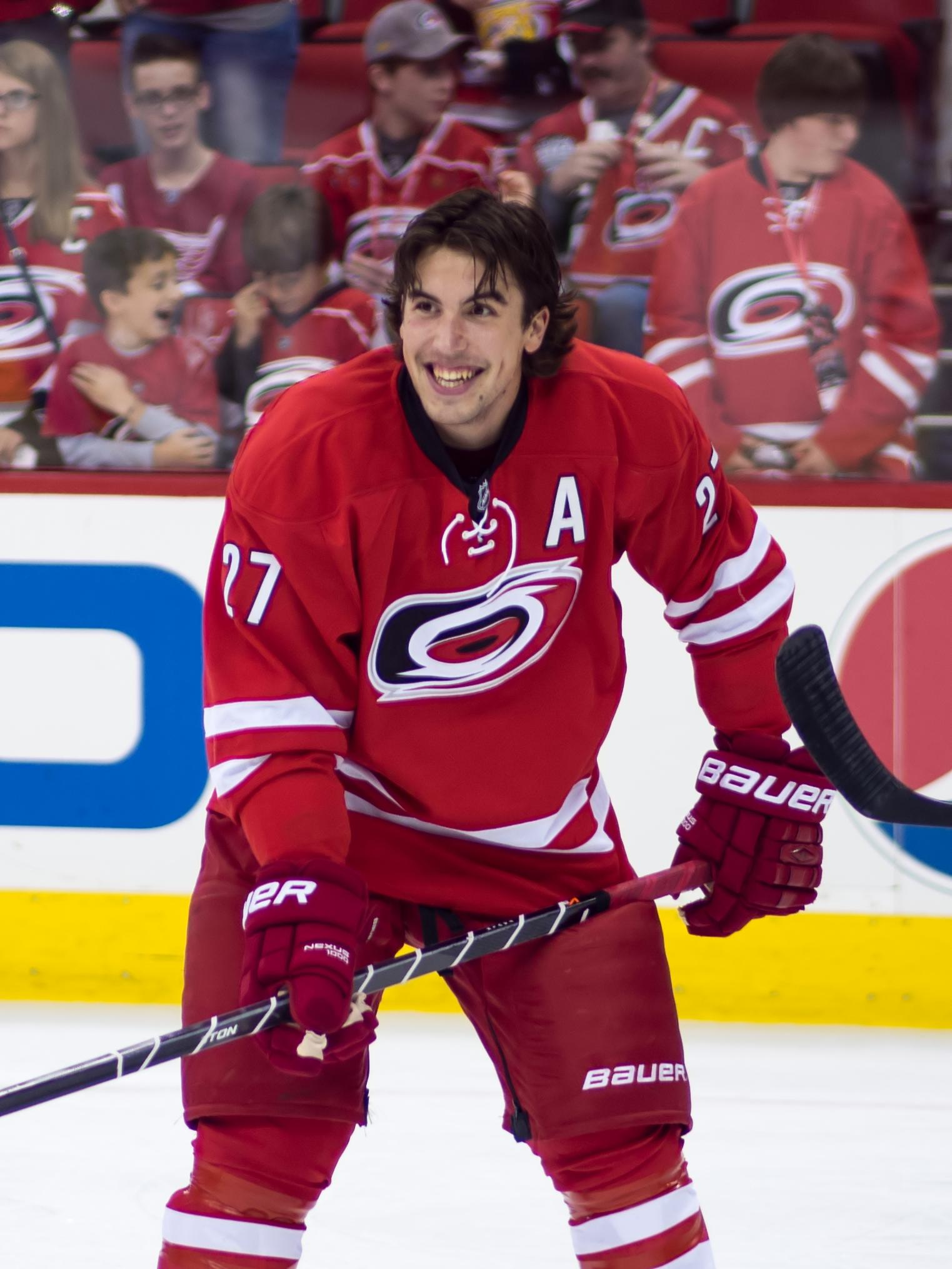
- Faulk with the Carolina Hurricanes in 2013
- Born: March 20, 1992 (age 34) South St. Paul, Minnesota, U.S.
- Height: 6 ft 0 in (183 cm)
- Weight: 217 lb (98 kg; 15 st 7 lb)
- Position: Defense
- Shoots: Right
- NHL team Former teams: Detroit Red Wings; Carolina Hurricanes; St. Louis Blues
- National team: United States
- NHL draft: 37th overall, 2010; Carolina Hurricanes
- Playing career: 2011–present

Justin Michael Faulk (born March 20, 1992) is an American professional ice hockey player who is a defenseman for the Detroit Red Wings of the National Hockey League (NHL). He played for the Carolina Hurricanes for the first eight years of his career, then playing seven seasons for the St. Louis Blues. He was selected by the Hurricanes in the second round (37th overall) of the 2010 NHL entry draft.

Before turning professional, Faulk played for the University of Minnesota Duluth where he set a new school record for most goals by a rookie defenceman and helped them capture the national championship.

== Early life ==
Faulk was born on March 20, 1992, in South St. Paul, Minnesota to parents Gail and Dale. Faulk learned how to ice skate at three years old and began playing organized ice hockey at the age of six. His father died when he was seven years old and he was subsequently raised by his mother alongside his brother David. Following his father's death, Faulk described his mother as the biggest influence on his career.

== Playing career ==
=== Amateur ===
Growing up in Minnesota, Faulk played prep ice hockey for South St. Paul High School before joining the USA Hockey National Team Development Program (USNTDP) for two seasons. During the 2007–08 season, Faulk recorded six goals and 15 assists to earn honorable mention all-conference honors. As a sophomore, he committed to play Division 1 hockey for the University of Minnesota Duluth for the 2010–11 season. Faulk had previously considered playing in the United States Hockey League but felt that the USNTDP would be better for his development.

Faulk spent the 2010–11 season playing for the University of Minnesota Duluth, helping them capture the national championship. During this season, Faulk set a new school record for most points in a single season by a freshman defenseman. His record was later beaten by Scott Perunovich in 2018. Faulk was then named to the All-WCHA Third Team and All-WCHA Rookie Team.

=== Carolina Hurricanes ===
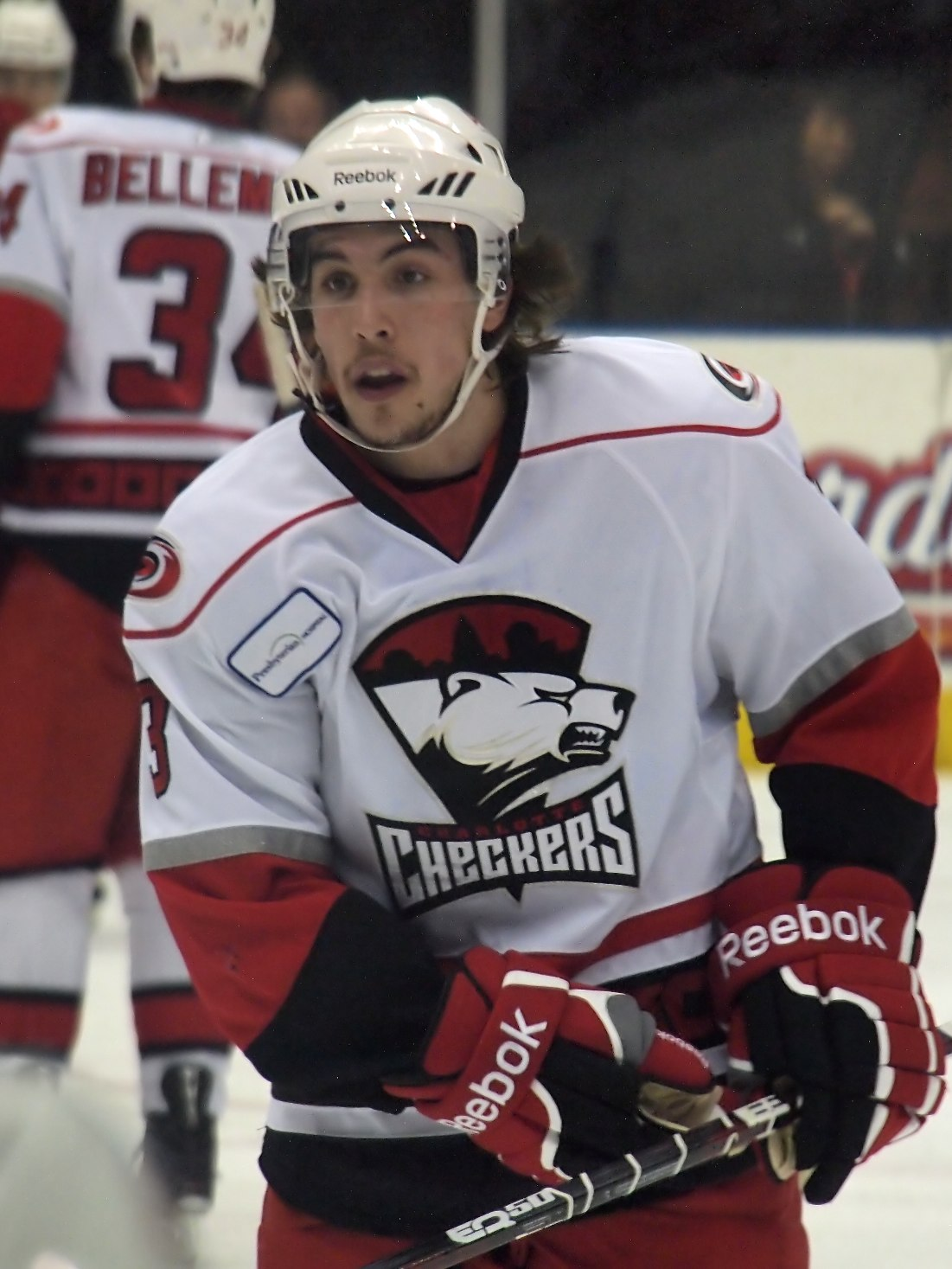
Faulk with the Charlotte Checkers in 2011.

On April 15, 2011, Faulk concluded his collegiate career by signing a three-year entry-level contract with the Carolina Hurricanes. Immediately following the signing, Faulk was assigned to the Hurricanes American Hockey League (AHL) affiliate, the Charlotte Checkers, for the remainder of the 2010–11 season. He made his professional debut in Game 4 of their first-round Calder Cup series against the Hershey Bears. He skated in 13 Calder Cup playoff games, posting two assists.

Prior to the start of the 2011–12 season, Faulk participated in the Hurricanes' prospect tournament and training camp. During the Hurricanes' exhibition games, Faulk saw time on the teams' power play and logged over 20 minutes of ice time. After impressing the coaching staff during training camp, Faulk was named to the Hurricanes' opening night roster. He made his debut on October 7 where he skated just under 20 minutes and accumulated four penalty minutes in the 5–1 loss to the Tampa Bay Lightning. He played in two more games for the Hurricanes, averaging 18:59 of ice time per game, before being re-assigned to the Charlotte Checkers on October 19. Faulk played in 12 games for the Checkers, tallying four goals and two assists, before returning to the NHL level on November 17. His four goals and six points were tied for first among Checkers defensemen. He immediately made an impact in the lineup and played just over 22 minutes in his first game back, including three minutes on the power play and 1:32 on the penalty kill. Upon rejoining the team, he developed chemistry with his defensive partner Jay Harrison and became a prominent point-man on the power play. Faulk scored his first career NHL goal on December 9, 2011, in a 4–2 loss to the Winnipeg Jets. Although he was invited to represent Team USA at the 2012 World Junior Ice Hockey Championships, the Hurricanes refused to release him. At the time, Faulk had accumulated one goal and three assists through 18 games. His defensive abilities were recognized in January as he was the lone Hurricane player selected to play in the 2012 NHL All-Star Game's YoungStar showcase. Following the All-Star Game, Faulk began to pick up in production and tallied two goals and two assists over six games. Through 44 games, he had accumulated six goals, nine assists, 72 shots on goal, and nine power-play points. By early April, he led all rookie defensemen with eight goals and 23 minutes of ice time. As the Hurricanes failed to qualify for the 2012 Stanley Cup playoffs, Faulk finished his rookie season with eight goals and 14 assists for 22 points through 66 games. He also led all Hurricanes skaters in average ice time per game and first among NHL rookie defensemen in power-play goals. As a result of his successful rookie season, Faulk was named to the 2012 NHL All-Rookie Team.

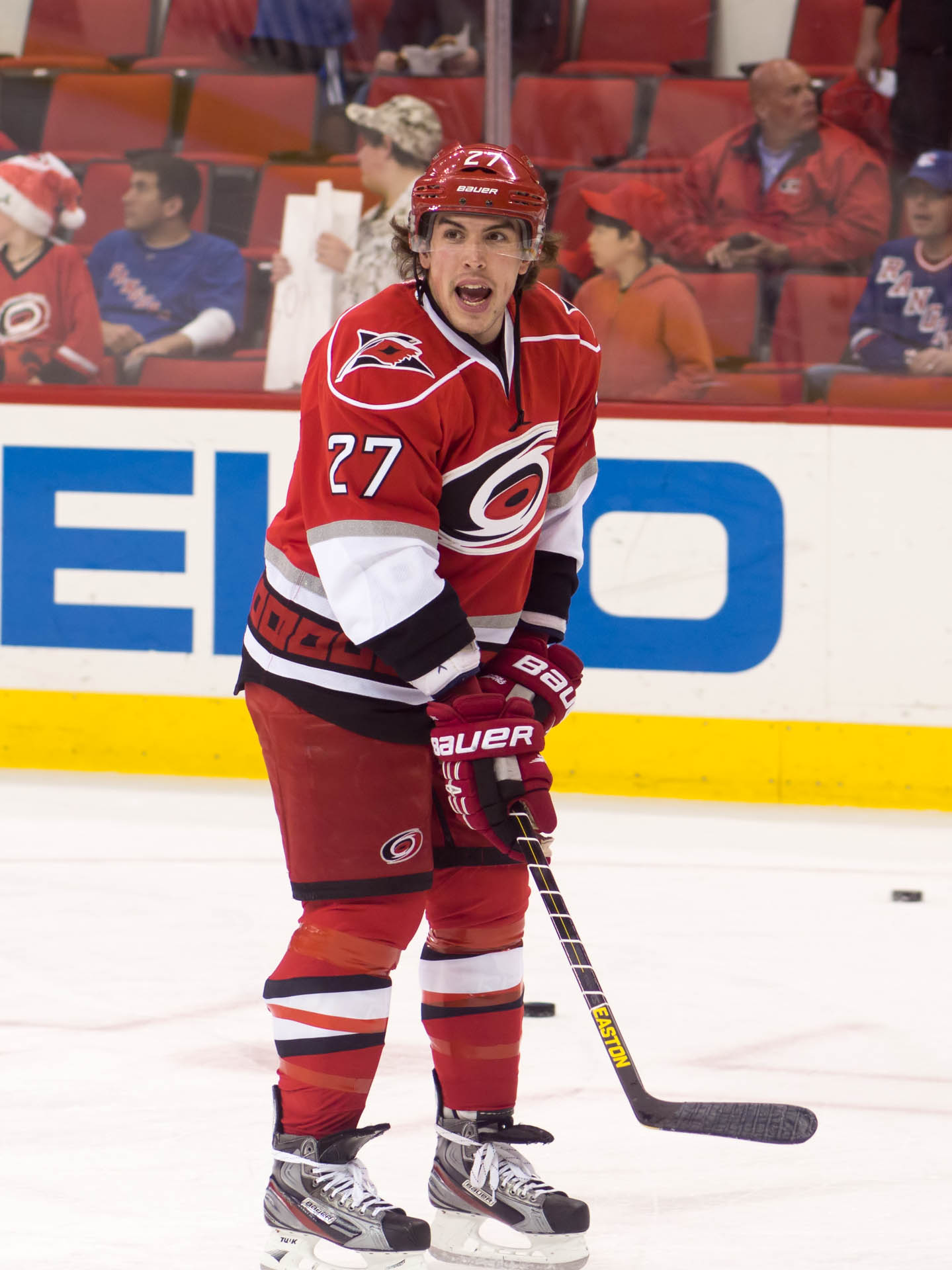
Faulk with the Hurricanes in April 2013.

After spending the majority of the previous season at the NHL level, Faulk split his time during the 2012–13 season between the Checkers and Hurricanes due to the 2012–13 NHL lockout. After participating in the Hurricanes' training camp, Faul was assigned to the Charlotte Checkers for the first half of the 2012–13 season. Despite suffering an injury early in the season, Faulk quickly ranked second among AHL defencemen with 13 points. Despite suffering a facial injury, Faulk ranked first on the team in assists with 19 and second on the team in scoring with 24 points by January 5. He would leave the AHL with the same point total once the NHL lock-out concluded on January 6. Once the 2012–13 season commenced, Faulk was partnered with Joni Pitkänen as the Hurricanes second defensive pair. The two were also the lone defenseman on the Hurricanes first power play unit. He quickly accumulated three goals and seven assists before suffering a second-degree MCL sprain in mid-March after he collided with Jack Skille in a 4–1 loss to the Florida Panthers. Faulk missed nine games to recover and returned to the Hurricanes lineup on April 9, 2013. Shortly after returning, Faulk played in his 100th career NHL game on April 20. At the time of the milestone, he was maintaining a three-game assist and point streak and tied for first among Carolina defencemen with 10 assists. Faulk finished the season as team MVP with five goals and 10 assists for 15 points.

Prior to the start of the 2013–14 season, the Hurricanes were realigned into the new Metropolitan Division. Faulk was also without his usual defensive partner as Joni Pitkänen was ruled out for the entirety of the 2013–14 season. Faulk again did not play a full season with the Hurricanes during the 2013–14 season due to the 2014 Winter Olympics, illness, and injury. He began the season strong, leading the team in ice time with an average of 24:17 per game as the Hurricanes maintained an 8–5–3 record through October. Faulk continued to improve through November and finished the month fourth on the team with one goal and four assists for five points through 14 games. He also ranked fifth on the team in overall points with 10 points through 26 games. By the start of January, Faulk ranked second among Hurricanes defensemen in scoring with three goals and 13 assists for 16 points through 40 games. He was also selected to represent Team USA at the 2014 Winter Olympics. Upon returning from the Olympics, Faulk had three assists and a minus-5 rating through 12-games. However, he soon sustained an upper-body injury and missed five games to recover. He returned to the lineup but shortly thereafter missed another game due to an injury. On March 24, 2014, Faulk signed a six-year $29 million dollar contract extension with the Hurricanes. Despite leading Hurricanes defensemen in shots, Faulk's 3.3 shooting percentage was the lowest on the team. He finished with a career-high five goals and 27 assists for 32 points through 76 games.

In the first year of his new contract, Faulk experienced a career-best season and set new personal records in goals, assists, and points. Faulk began the season strong, ranking 16th among NHL blueliners with five goals and 12 assists for 17 points by December 12. By the end of the first half of the season, Faulk ranked second on the team in scoring while also leading all team defensemen in goals and points. He also ranked in the top 20 among NHL defencemen in goals, points, game-winning goals, power-play goals, power-play points, and shots on net. His efforts were recognized with a selection to the 2015 NHL All-Star Game on January 10, 2015. Upon returning from the All-Star Game, Faulk continued to improve on his previous season's totals and ranked eighth among all NHL defensemen in scoring with 44 points by March 11. Later in the month, he became the fifth defenseman in franchise history to register nine shots on goal in a single game. On March 30, he surpassed Joni Pitkänen as the highest single-season point total by a Hurricanes defenseman. He subsequently finished the 2014–15 season with a career-best 15 goals and 49 points.

Although Faulk's production dipped in 2015–16 season, he set a new career high in goals and finished the season with a new league record. He scored his 10th and 11th power-play goals on December 8, 2015, to set a new Hurricanes record for most powerplay goals by a defenseman in a season. Upon scoring his 12th power-play goal in his 29th game, he tied a new franchise record (including the Hartford Whalers) for most powerplay goals by a defenseman in a season. His efforts were recognized with the NHL's Third Star of the Week for the week ending on December 13. He was recognized for collecting three goals and three assists through three games while also tying a franchise power play goal record. By December 24, Faulk had tallied nine points in eight games to lead the Hurricanes in scoring and lead the NHL with 12 power-play goals. At the time, he was on pace to score 60 per cent of his team's power-play goals for the first time in NHL history. Faulk scored his first even-strength goal of the season on December 26 in a 3–1 win over the New Jersey Devils. As a result of his overall success, Faulk was selected to represent the Hurricanes at the 2016 NHL All-Star Game. At the time of the selection, he ranked first among all NHL defencemen in power-play goals and second in overall goals and game-winning goals. However, upon returning from the All-Star Game, Faulk suffered numerous injuries which derailed his season. While holding the team lead in scoring with 34 points, Faulk suffered an injury during practice in early February. He subsequently missed 18 games to recover from the injury and returned to the Hurricanes lineup in late March. Despite his lengthy absence, Faulk tied for seventh among NHL defensemen with 16 goals and tied for fifth with game-winners. He also finished the season as one of seven defensemen with at least 30 goals in the past two seasons combined.

Leading up to the 2016–17 season, Faulk was expected to man the Hurricanes top defensive line with Jaccob Slavin. In the Hurricanes second to last preseason game, Faulk suffered a lower-body injury and missed their final game. This was the first of numerous injuries that affected Faulk's season. Although he recovered enough to join the Hurricanes for the start of the regular season, he soon suffered an upper-body injury on November 6 against the New Jersey Devils. At the time of the injury, he led all Hurricanes defensemen with three goals and tied for fourth with six points. He was activated off of injured reserve on November 15 after missing three games. Upon returning to the lineup, Faulk continued to produce and quickly accumulated four more goals and six more assists. However, he suffered another injury on December 23 in a game against the Boston Bruins and subsequently missed four games to recover. Shortly after returning to the Hurricanes, Faulk was selected for his third consecutive NHL All-Star Game. At the time, he led all Carolina defensemen with seven goals and tied for first in points with 16 while skating an average of 23:05 per game. On April 2, Faulk set a new record for goals by a Hurricanes defensemen in one season with 17. Three games later, he played in his 400th career NHL game against the St. Louis Blues.

On October 5, 2017, Faulk and Jordan Staal were named co-captains of the Hurricanes. On February 13, 2018, Faulk recorded his first NHL natural hat trick becoming only the 10th defenceman in NHL history to score one. On April 23, 2018, Faulk was nominated for the King Clancy Memorial Trophy as a player who best exemplifies leadership qualities on and off the ice and gives back to his community. Instead of staying with co-captaincy the following season, the Hurricanes decided to name Justin Williams as captain; Faulk was named an alternate captain alongside Jordan Staal. Faulk played in his 500th career NHL game during a 4–1 loss to the New York Islanders on November 24, 2018.

=== St. Louis Blues ===
On September 24, 2019, Faulk and a 2020 fifth-round pick were traded to the St. Louis Blues in exchange for Joel Edmundson, Dominik Bokk and a 2021 seventh-round pick. The Blues immediately signed Faulk to a seven-year, $45.5 million contract extension, which began during the 2020–21 season. By February 2020, Faulk had recorded 13 points in 53 games for the Blues. The Blues were eventually eliminated from Stanley Cup contention after losing 6–2 in Game 6 of the Western Conference First Round against the Vancouver Canucks.

The following season, Faulk returned to the Blues. During Game 2 against the Colorado Avalanche, forward Nazem Kadri hit Faulk with his shoulder, striking his head. As a result, Faulk missed Game 3 against the Avalanche and Kadri was suspended for eight games. The Blues were eventually eliminated from the 2021 Stanley Cup playoffs in Game 4.

On November 18, 2025, Faulk played his 1,000th NHL game, becoming the 414th player to reach the mark.

=== Detroit Red Wings ===
On March 6, 2026, Faulk was traded to the Detroit Red Wings, in exchange for Dmitri Buchelnikov, Justin Holl, and first and third-round picks in 2026.

Faulk recorded his first goal with the Red Wings since being traded in a 4-3 loss against the Florida Panthers on March 10, 2026.

On October 6, 2026, scoring a goal and an assist, Faulk reached the milestone of 500 career points. He is the 14th active defenceman in the NHL to reach this milestone, following Cam Fowler.

== International play ==
Medal record

Representing United States

Ice hockey

World Championships
Bronze medal – third place	2013 Sweden/Finland	
Bronze medal – third place	2015 Czech Republic	

World Junior Hockey Championships
Bronze medal – third place	2011 United States	

IIHF World U18 Championships
Gold medal – first place	2010 Belarus	

Internationally, Faulk has represented the United States at four different events. He helped the Americans win gold at the 2010 IIHF World U18 Championships and bronze during the 2011 World Junior Ice Hockey Championships. He also played at the Senior level at the 2012, 2013 and the 2014 World Championships, and made his Olympic Debut at the 2014 Winter Olympics in Sochi. Faulk was the youngest player on Team USA's roster for the 2014 Olympics, at the age of 21. Faulk also played in the 2026 IIHF World Championships for the United States and was made captain for that team. He was the oldest player on Team USA's 2026 IIHF roster at the age of 34.

== Career statistics ==
=== Regular season and playoffs ===
			Regular season					Playoffs
Season	Team	League	GP	G	A	Pts	PIM	GP	G	A	Pts	PIM
2007–08	South St. Paul Secondary	HS-MN	26	6	15	21	32	—	—	—	—	—
2008–09	U.S. NTDP U17	USDP	17	7	9	16	35	—	—	—	—	—
2008–09	U.S. NTDP U18	USDP	1	0	0	0	0	—	—	—	—	—
2008–09	U.S. NTDP U18	NAHL	38	3	9	12	20	9	3	3	6	8
2009–10	U.S. NTDP Juniors	USHL	21	9	3	12	46	—	—	—	—	—
2009–10	U.S. NTDP U18	USDP	39	12	9	21	20	—	—	—	—	—
2010–11	University of Minnesota Duluth	WCHA	39	8	25	33	47	—	—	—	—	—
2010–11	Charlotte Checkers	AHL	—	—	—	—	—	13	0	2	2	2
2011–12	Charlotte Checkers	AHL	12	2	4	6	11	—	—	—	—	—
2011–12	Carolina Hurricanes	NHL	66	8	14	22	29	—	—	—	—	—
2012–13	Charlotte Checkers	AHL	31	5	19	24	16	—	—	—	—	—
2012–13	Carolina Hurricanes	NHL	38	5	10	15	15	—	—	—	—	—
2013–14	Carolina Hurricanes	NHL	76	5	27	32	37	—	—	—	—	—
2014–15	Carolina Hurricanes	NHL	82	15	34	49	30	—	—	—	—	—
2015–16	Carolina Hurricanes	NHL	64	16	21	37	27	—	—	—	—	—
2016–17	Carolina Hurricanes	NHL	75	17	20	37	32	—	—	—	—	—
2017–18	Carolina Hurricanes	NHL	76	8	23	31	48	—	—	—	—	—
2018–19	Carolina Hurricanes	NHL	82	11	24	35	47	15	1	7	8	4
2019–20	St. Louis Blues	NHL	69	5	11	16	32	9	1	0	1	2
2020–21	St. Louis Blues	NHL	56	7	18	25	35	2	0	0	0	2
2021–22	St. Louis Blues	NHL	76	16	31	47	43	12	1	7	8	10
2022–23	St. Louis Blues	NHL	82	11	39	50	34	—	—	—	—	—
2023–24	St. Louis Blues	NHL	60	2	28	30	39	—	—	—	—	—
2024–25	St. Louis Blues	NHL	78	4	28	32	30	7	1	2	3	8
2025–26	St. Louis Blues	NHL	61	11	21	32	32	—	—	—	—	—
2025–26	Detroit Red Wings	NHL	17	5	3	8	10	—	—	—	—	—
NHL totals			1,058	146	352	498	520	45	4	16	20	26

=== International ===
Year	Team	Event	Result	GP	G	A	Pts	PIM
2010	United States	U18	1st place, gold medalist(s)	7	1	3	4	6
2011	United States	WJC	3rd place, bronze medalist(s)	6	1	3	4	0
2012	United States	WC	7th	8	4	4	8	2
2013	United States	WC	3rd place, bronze medalist(s)	10	0	6	6	2
2014	United States	OG	4th	2	0	0	0	0
2015	United States	WC	3rd place, bronze medalist(s)	10	0	3	3	4
2026	United States	WC	8th	8	2	3	5	0
Junior totals				13	2	6	8	6
Senior totals				38	6	16	22	8

== Awards and honors ==
Award	Year	Refs
College
All-WCHA Rookie Team	2011	
All-WCHA Third Team	2011	
NCAA All-Tournament Team	2011	
NHL
All-Rookie Team	2012	
All-Star Game	2015, 2016, 2017	

Sporting positions
Preceded by Eric Staal	Carolina Hurricanes captain 2017–18 with Jordan Staal	Succeeded by Justin Williams
