= Deep Freeze Ice Arena =

Coordinates: 40.99518°N 80.64844°W

Boardman Deep Ice
- Interactive map of Boardman Deep Ice
- Location: Boardman, Ohio, United States
- Owner: Boardman Extreme Air
- Surface: 200' x 98'

Tenant
- Youngstown/Mahoning Valley Phantoms (NAHL) (2003–2009)

Deep Freeze Ice Arena is located in Boardman, Ohio, a suburb of Youngstown, Ohio. Deep Freeze Ice Arena has one Olympic-sized ice sheet. New owners have taken over. The rink used to be called The Ice Zone but has been bought by the owner of the Boardman Extreme Air and is now renamed, Deep Freeze Ice Arena. It currently serves as the practice facility for the Youngstown Phantoms of the United States Hockey League.

Following the transfer of ownership, Boardman police investigated a claim that a large amount of Freon was released from its storage tank, which was found empty. Also, the ice was melted before possession was transferred to the new owners. This resulted in an interruption of operations at the Ice Zone; youth programs such as ice hockey and figure skating lost ice time as a result. According to Zoldan, the new owners bought the building, not the equipment.

Now the ice is managed by Black Bear Sports Group.
